= List of Shameless (British TV series) characters =

The following is a list of fictional characters from the English comedy-drama Shameless, created by Paul Abbott, and aired on Channel 4 between 2004 and 2013.

Set on the fictional Chatsworth Estate in Manchester, the programme follows the lives of the Gallagher family, their neighbours the Maguire family, friends, and those who run the local shops and pub, The Jockey.

The first series focuses on Frank Gallagher, a dysfunctional patriarch, and his six children: Fiona (with her boyfriend Steve), Lip, Ian, Carl, Debbie and Liam. The series also introduces next-door neighbours Kev and Veronica.

Introduced in the second series, the Maguire family becomes increasingly interwoven with the Gallagher family's lives. Both families face complex challenges, including marriage difficulties, teenage pregnancies, and neighbourhood rivalries.

Other characters, such as the Karib family, also take on more prominent roles after starting as minor characters, Throughout the series' run, the Gallagher family went through significant changes, with many of the Gallagher children departing the show due to the actors moving onto other projects.

== Credited cast ==
Actor	Character	Appearances										
Actor	Character	1	2	3	4	5	6	7	8	9	10	11
David Threlfall	Frank Gallagher	Main	Main	Main	Main	Main	Main	Main	Main	Main	Main	Main
Anne-Marie Duff	Fiona Gallagher	Main	Main									Recurring
Jody Latham	Lip Gallagher	Main	Main	Main	Main	Recurring						Recurring
Gerard Kearns	Ian Gallagher	Main	Main	Main	Main	Main	Main	Main				
Rebecca Ryan	Debbie Gallagher	Main	Main	Main	Main	Main	Main					
Elliott Tittensor	Carl Gallagher	Main	Main	Main	Main	Main	Main	Main	Main	Main		Recurring
Luke Tittensor	Carl Gallagher	Main										
Annabelle Apsion	Monica Gallagher	Recurring		Recurring	Main	Main	Main		Recurring			Recurring
Joseph Furnace	Liam Gallagher	Main	Main									
Johnny Bennett	Liam Gallagher			Main	Main	Main	Main	Main	Recurring			
Sean Gilder	Paddy Maguire		Recurring	Recurring	Main	Main	Main	Main				
Tina Malone	Mimi Tutton		Recurring	Recurring	Main	Main	Main	Main	Main	Main	Main	Main
Aaron McCusker	Jamie Maguire				Main	Main	Main	Main	Main	Main	Main	Main
Rebecca Atkinson	Karen Maguire	Main	Main	Main	Main	Main	Main	Main	Main	Main	Main	Main
Chris Bisson	Kash Karib	Main	Main	Recurring	Recurring		Recurring					
Kelli Hollis	Yvonne Karib	Main	Main	Main	Main	Main	Main	Recurring				Recurring
Anthony Flanagan	Tony	Main	Main	Main								
Lindsey Dawson	Jez	Main	Main	Main	Main							
Marjorie Yates	Carol Fisher	Recurring	Main	Main	Main							
Jack Deam	Marty Fisher	Recurring	Main	Main	Recurring				Main	Main	Main	Recurring
Samantha Siddall	Mandy Maguire	Recurring	Main	Main	Main	Main	Main		Recurring			
Dystin Johnson	Norma Starkey	Recurring		Recurring	Main	Main	Main					
Warren Donnelly	Stan Waterman	Recurring	Main	Main	Main	Main	Main	Recurring				
Alice Barry	Lillian Tyler		Main	Main	Main	Main	Main	Main	Main	Main	Main	Main
Chris Coghill	Craig Garland		Main	Recurring								
Gillian Kearney	Sue Garland		Main	Main	Recurring							
Nicky Evans	Shane Maguire			Recurring	Main	Main	Main	Main	Main	Main	Main	Main
Sally Carman	Kelly Maguire		Recurring	Recurring	Recurring	Main	Main	Main	Main	Main	Main	Recurring
Ciarán Griffiths	Mickey Maguire				Main	Main	Main	Main	Main	Main		
Michael Legge	Tom O'Leary				Main	Main	Main					
Amanda Ryan	Carrie Rogers				Main	Main	Main					
Qasim Akhtar	Chesney Karib				Recurring	Main	Main	Main	Main	Main	Main	Main
Sarah Patel	Meena Karib				Recurring	Main	Main					
Ben Batt	Joe Pritchard						Main	Main				
Joanna Higson	Maxine Donnelly						Main	Main				
Philip Hill-Pearson	Bruce Donnelly							Main				
Pauline McLynn	Libby Croker							Main	Main			
Valerie Lilley	Patty Croker							Main	Main	Main	Main	
Michael Taylor	Billy Tutton							Recurring	Main	Main	Main	Main
Karen Bryson	Avril Powell								Main	Main	Main	Main
Emmanuel Ighodaro	Jackson Powell								Main	Main	Main	
Kira Martin	Letitia Powell								Main	Main	Main	Main
Robbie Conway	Aidan Croker								Main	Main	Main	Main
Aysha Kala	Sita Desai								Main			
Angeline Ball	Gloria Meak									Main	Main	Recurring
Kari Corbett	Ruby Hepburn									Main	Main	
Stephen Lord	Dominic Meak									Main	Main	Recurring
Nikita Brownlee	Stella Gallagher											Main
Jacqueline Boatswain	Patreesha St. Rose											Main
Adelle Leonce	Mary-Mae St. Rose											Main
Sarah Totty	Sherilee											Main
Sue Vincent	Derilee											Main
Jalaal Hartley	Kassi Blanco											Recurring
Isy Suttie	Esther Blanco											Main
Rhys Cadman	Tam Blanco											Main
Lewis Hardaker	Saul Blanco											Main
Jade Kilduff	Thalia Blanco											Main
Thaila Zucchi	Randall											Recurring
Moya Brady	Remona											Main

== The Gallagher family ==
=== Frank Gallagher ===
- Played by: David Threlfall (Series 1–11)

Frank Gallagher
- Shameless character
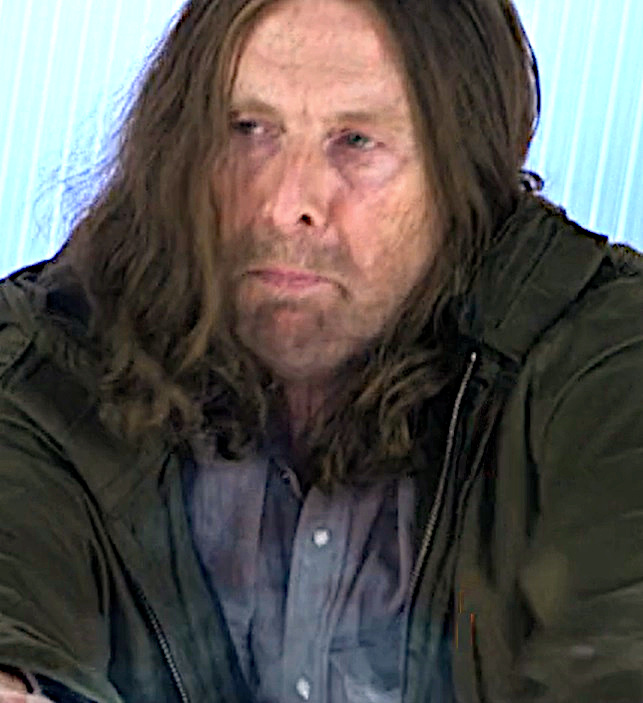
- Portrayed by: David Threlfall
- Duration: 2004–2013
- First appearance: 13 January 2004; Series 1 Episode 1 "Meet the Gallaghers"
- Last appearance: 28 May 2013; Series 11 Episode 14 "End of the Line"
- Created by: Paul Abbott
- Introduced by: George Faber
In-universe information
- Occupation: Unemployed
- Father: Neville Gallagher
- Mother: Sarah Elizabeth Gallagher
- Wife: Monica Gallager (divorced); Sheila Jackson (2006–2007)
- Sons: Lip Gallagher; Carl Gallagher; Liam Gallagher; Nigel Gallagher; Ben Gallagher
- Daughters: Monica's unnamed half-sister Fiona Gallagher; Debbie Gallagher; Delia Gallagher; Stella Gallagher
- Adoptive sons: Ian Gallagher
- Stepdaughters: Karen Maguire (2006–2007)
- Granddaughters: Katie Maguire
- Grandmothers: Nin Gallagher
- Aunts: Iris Gallagher

Vernon Francis "Frank" Gallagher (born 16 January 1960) is the main protagonist of Shameless. He appeared in 137 episodes.

Frank is characterised by inebriated monologues covering diverse literary, historical, and philosophical topics. These often circle back to his perception of decent, hard-working individuals, including himself, facing unwarranted discrimination. Frank frequently quotes Shakespeare, the Bible, references international current events, and uses poetry and soliloquy to express his feelings or views, as he does at the start of each episode. Thus, in spite of his drunken ramblings, sometimes he does come across as being well-educated owing to the issues he raises during his interactions with others. He also shows countless signs of schizophrenia throughout the series, and it is directly stated that he has schizophrenia in series 2.

Frank is an unemployed alcoholic, and the son of Neville (John Woodvine) and Sarah Elizabeth Gallagher (1935–1972). He was married to Monica (Annabelle Apsion), with whom he has six biological children: Fiona (Anne-Marie Duff), Lip (Jody Latham), Carl (Elliott Tittensor), Debbie (Rebecca Ryan), Liam (Johnny Bennett) and Stella (Nikita Brownlee), and is the de jure father of Ian (Gerard Kearns). He also has two children with Sheila Jackson (Maggie O'Neill), Nigel and Delia, and is the father of Monica's half-sister, whom he fathered with Monica's mother at Monica's birthday party. He has two grandchildren: Lip's daughter, Katie Maguire, and an unnamed child of Fiona's. During one of Frank's drunken rants, it is implied that he got many girls pregnant in school. This is never elaborated upon and it is unclear precisely how many children Frank has actually fathered.

Frank was apparently convicted and sentenced to imprisonment several times in his youth. He claimed to have been incarcerated in Strangeways Prison. It has not been mentioned what exactly his string of past convictions was for.

Frank's alcoholism intensified after his first wife Monica left him for Norma Starkey (Dystin Johnson). He then left the younger children in the care of Fiona, and moved in with agoraphobic Sheila. Often known to make a fool out of himself and shirk all responsibility, Frank nonetheless shows signs of loving his children. He offers good advice, for example, saving Liam from being taken into care when a parent was needed. When he is rendered completely sober by a new drug, Frank appears reflective and even quite intelligent, wondering why Sheila would add to her problems by marrying a mess like him. We also better understand his disposition when Frank's father pays a visit and treats his son in a condescending and abrasive manner. Frank's father shows extreme sympathy towards Sheila and even takes care of the twins. It is also stated that his father did not always treat Frank kindly when Frank was growing up.

In the early series, Frank is portrayed as a drunken bully who even head-butts his son Ian on one occasion. Most of his children initially hate Frank for his drunken bullying ways. Lip and Ian are never scared to show their feelings towards him and physically attack him on a few occasions. However, his middle daughter, Debbie, shows sympathy throughout the series when her father is either in serious trouble or presumed dead, something which happens three times. As the series progresses, the family generally warms up to him, mostly because he isn’t bothering them hugely on a daily basis. However, Debbie finally grows sick of taking care of the family, cleaning up after Frank in particular, and leaves to join the army after series 6. In series 7, Frank and Liam come into serious conflict when Liam is forced by circumstances to take over Debbie’s former burden as the de facto head of the family. At one point, Frank head-butts Liam, and a furious Carl has to be restrained from beating Frank to a pulp. Frank finally softens towards Liam when Liam threatens to commit suicide.

In series 7, Frank falls for a librarian named Libby Croker (Pauline McLynn). Libby believes Frank is a man of the arts and he encourages her to rise up against her library closing, which leads to a violent protest and her imprisonment. When Libby is released from prison, she tries to find him, but her upscale appearance causes various characters to warn Frank that the DSS is after him. Finally, they meet again, and although Libby is initially put off by his poor character and a frosty reception from Liam, she and her disabled mother, Patty (Valerie Lilley), move into the Gallagher home. Frank and Patty soon set up a mutual loathing society, with Frank painting her bedroom a bright yellow just to keep her awake. However, he must also endure her endless put-downs. In Series 8 Frank is kept hostage in a psychiatric hospital by former wife Monica's girlfriend, part of Monica's plan to snatch her family back from Libby and prevent the pair from getting married. On Frank's escape, the pair stay unmarried and he will eventually lose Libby in Episode 13 after cheating on her with Letitia Powell's (Kira Martin) headmistress (Annie Wallace).

In series 8, Frank is ready to marry Libby and he goes missing on his stag night. Libby starts putting up posters because of his disappearance. Carl and Chesney Karib (Qasim Akhtar) find a video on the internet of Frank having sex in public. Libby walks in and sees the video. In the feature-length 100th episode Frank is accused of beating an old lady who is well known on the estate for her scratch-card winnings. Frank suffers a blackout and throughout the episode has flashbacks of that evening. Not knowing if he actually carried out the attack, he hands himself into the police. Carl is convinced Frank is innocent. He digs into the events of that night and finds that a local gangster's brother had actually carried out the attack. Frank, along with Kev, devises a plan to work with the police and cuts a deal with the gangster that sees Frank set free.

From Series 9, Frank is the only original member of the Gallagher family left after Carl leaves to join the police. He takes care of a terrapin called Terry, that he stole from a petting zoo.

By Series 11, he and his daughter Stella who is now six years old, live at the Gallagher House along with Aidan who both are left to contend with Frank's outrageous behaviour. He is still neglectful of his sole child, who shows great maturity for her age, and is shown to be thoughtful and caring to him, still calling him "Dad". While out, Frank finds his son Lip (Jody Latham), and invites him along with his granddaughter, Katie (Bethany Thompson). He reaches an understanding with his son, who then treats him much better. After Frank has begun a three-way relationship with prostitutes Sherilee (Sarah Totty) and Derilee (Sue Vincent), Derilee's husband Baxter arrives at the Gallagher household and holds Frank, Stella and Derilee hostage at gunpoint. While negotiating with Baxter for their freedom, Monica returns to Chatsworth to take Stella's place in the hostage situation. However, Stella ends up running back inside, with Monica also being held captive. While Derilee and Baxter solve their differences, Frank and Monica have sex, resulting in Monica falling pregnant with twins. Frank was arrested and visited by her and tells her to have an abortion, however one of the twins survives, and she gives birth to Ben Gallagher in The Jockey. Frank shows a lack of interest in the child and leaves care to Stella. Meanwhile, Monica feigns bereavement over the baby she "miscarried". Frank's oldest daughter, Fiona McBride (Anne-Marie Duff), returns to Chatsworth with Carl and Lip. Frank learns he has a grandson from Fiona who attempts to make Frank and Monica see that their disastrous parenting is only going to damage Stella and Ben. Fiona decides to take Stella and Ben back to Amsterdam with her, leaving them in the care of her old friend, Kev Ball (Dean Lennox Kelly), however he loses them. Frank has an argument with Monica and decides to leave Chatsworth since he believes he is better off without his family. However, Stella follows Frank to the bus stop with Ben in her arms, as Frank rages at an upset Stella that she was a mistake and that she ruined his life, leading to her sadly walk away alone. A guilty Frank later finds Stella and Ben at a local park; he apologizes for his harsh behaviour and confirms that he does love her, much to her joy. He lets Stella play while he finally takes an active role in caring for Ben. Frank soon takes them back to the Gallagher household, walking into Fiona and Monica fighting over the upbringing of the two children. He refuses to let Fiona take his youngest children. Even though Lip and Carl try to convince Fiona otherwise, Fiona refuses to believe they will change and offers Frank money to leave as he intended. However, he refuses to take it. She sees that he couldn't live without his family and is pleased to see this side of him. In the end, Fiona sees Stella and Ben will be fine in Frank and Monica's care, and they remain in Chatsworth. Frank also makes amends with his oldest children who have new respect for him.

The final scene is a reference to the start of every episode, a monologue by Frank ending with him yelling 'scatter' to the backdrop of a burning car.

=== Monica Gallagher ===
- Played by: Annabelle Apsion (Series 1, 3–6, 8, 11)

Monica Gallagher
- Shameless character
- Portrayed by: Annabelle Apsion
- Duration: 2004, 2006, 2007–2009, 2011, 2013
- First appearance: 17 February 2004; Series 1 Episode 6 "Monica Comes Home (Part 1 of 2)"
- Last appearance: 28 May 2013; Series 11 Episode 14 "End of the Line"
- Created by: Paul Abbott
- Introduced by: George Faber
In-universe information
- Occupation: Housewife
- Mother: Joan Dallimore
- Husband: Frank Gallagher (divorced)
- Sons: Lip Gallagher; Ian Gallagher; Carl Gallagher; Liam Gallagher; Ben Gallagher; Bill Gallagher
- Daughters: Fiona Gallagher; Debbie Gallagher; Stella Gallagher
- Granddaughters: Katie Maguire
- Aunts: Barbara Dallimore

Monica Gallagher (born 24 April 1963) is Frank Gallagher's (David Threlfall) estranged wife, and the mother of Fiona (Anne-Marie Duff), Lip (Jody Latham), Ian (Gerard Kearns), Carl (Elliott Tittensor), Debbie (Rebecca Ryan), Liam (Johnny Bennett) and Stella (Nikita Brownlee). She is bisexual and left Frank for a lorry driver named Norma Starkey (Dystin Johnson). She came home at the end of series 1 but left by the start of series 2. She then returned for good at the beginning of series 4 and resumed co-habitating with Frank. Although her intentions for this were unknown at first, a visit from her mother in series 5 explained her backstory and a possible reason why she returned to be with her children. Monica announced at the beginning of series 5 that she was pregnant again, giving birth to Stella at the end of the series. She has two known grandchildren, an unnamed child from Fiona when she left in Series 2, and Lip's daughter, Katie Maguire. Monica appeared in 40 episodes overall.

When she returned home in series 1 and series 3, her children, apart from Carl, treated her with nothing but suspicion and hostility for leaving them with Frank. Fiona (in series 1) and Debbie (in series 4–6) were especially hostile since they were the ones who were forced to take on the household duties. Even when Monica returned for an extended stay, Debbie was still responsible for looking after Liam, and to an extent, her older brothers. Although Monica wanted to be a good mother, and was shown doing some household chores, laziness and selfishness prevented her from being any real help.

In series 6, feeling unloved by her children and Frank, Monica left once again. However, Monica returned in series 8, after the family receives news that her daughter, Debbie, has been killed. She acted the same way with Frank's new partner, Libby Croker (Pauline McLynn), as she earlier did with Sheila. It soon became apparent that the death was a hoax set up by Monica and her civil partner, a psychiatric nurse called Mildred, who dresses up as an army officer and tells Libby that Debbie was killed in Afghanistan. Monica was determined to claim back her family, even going as far as to demand custody of her youngest children and, when Frank and Libby were reunited, Monica admitted that the reason she returned was truly for Frank as he was the one and she would "always come back". However, Frank knew that she would leave again, the same as she did before to him and to Norma and wouldn't let her ruin another of his relationships, so he chooses to stay with Libby. It was then revealed that Liam (who started warming up to her before leaving in series 6) had decided to live with Monica permanently so he could help her to see love inside herself. She returns in the show's penultimate episode when she sees on the news Frank and Stella are held hostage and tries to negotiate a deal where she would take Stella's place, but ends up locked with her daughter and ex-husband. Soon, Monica and Frank admit to still having feelings for each other and they have sex. In the final episode, she gives birth to her eighth child, Ben, but feels guilty about aborting his twin brother and, drowning in her own guilt, neglects Ben. Upon her return, Fiona is disgusted to know that Monica is still the same person that abandoned her, though this time she’s remorseful for letting her children down constantly. Monica eventually shows concern and stands up to Frank when she realises Fiona is taking Stella and Ben with her.

=== Sheila Jackson ===
- Played by: Maggie O'Neill (Series 1–4)

Sheila Jackson
- Shameless character
- Portrayed by: Maggie O'Neill
- Duration: 2004–2007
- First appearance: 13 January 2004; Series 1 Episode 1 "Meet the Gallaghers"
- Last appearance: 16 January 2007; Series 4 Episode 3 "You Decide"
- Created by: Paul Abbott
- Introduced by: George Faber
In-universe information
- Occupation: Housewife
- Husband: Sheldon (deceased); Eddie Jackson (divorced); Frank Gallagher (2006–2007)
- Sons: Nigel Gallagher
- Daughters: Karen Maguire; Delia Gallagher
- Stepsons: Lip Gallagher; Carl Gallagher; Liam Gallagher
- Stepdaughters: Fiona Gallagher; Debbie Gallagher
- Grandsons: Connor Maguire

Nigel Gallagher
- Shameless character
In-universe information
- Father: Frank Gallagher
- Mother: Sheila Jackson
- Stepmother: Monica Gallagher
- Sisters: Delia Gallagher
- Half-brothers: Lip Gallagher; Carl Gallagher; Liam Gallagher; Ben Gallagher
- Half-sisters: Fiona Gallagher; Karen Maguire; Debbie Gallagher; Stella Gallagher
- Grandfathers: Neville Gallagher
- Nephews: Connor Maguire
- Nieces: Katie Maguire

Delia Gallagher
- Shameless character
In-universe information
- Father: Frank Gallagher
- Mother: Sheila Jackson
- Stepmother: Monica Gallagher
- Brothers: Nigel Gallagher
- Half-brothers: Lip Gallagher; Carl Gallagher; Liam Gallagher; Ben Gallagher
- Half-sisters: Fiona Gallagher; Karen Maguire; Debbie Gallagher; Stella Gallagher
- Grandfathers: Neville Gallagher
- Nephews: Connor Maguire
- Nieces: Katie Maguire

Sheila Jackson (also Gallagher; born 1962) is the third married second wife of Frank Gallagher (David Threlfall). She is the mother of Karen Maguire (Rebecca Atkinson), who she had with second husband, Eddie Jackson (Steve Pemberton) and twins Nigel and Delia Gallagher, who she had with Frank in 2005. Sheila appeared in 27 episodes in total.

Sheila was first married to Sheldon. Sheila murdered Sheldon and buried him in her back garden after years of domestic abuse. Her second husband and father of Karen, Eddie, left her in series 1 after he caught his daughter performing oral sex on Ian (Gerard Kearns) and Lip Gallagher (Jody Latham) under the dining room table.

Sheila has agoraphobia and is a fan of daytime television, especially Countdown, finding it unbelievable that someone doesn't know who Carol Vorderman or Richard Whiteley are. She has a fixation with performing anal sexual acts upon Frank. She named her twins after two famous chefs, Delia Smith and Nigel Slater (although it is possible that the latter was named after Nigella Lawson). Sheila left with the twins to go on a cruise after discovering Frank had not divorced his former wife Monica (Annabelle Apsion), who had suddenly reappeared with her lesbian girlfriend.

In the last episode of series 5, Frank goes into a coma and dreams of his unusual family, where Monica still has her physical body, but the mental state of Sheila, in which Frank refers to her as Sheila-Monica. This is shown in the way that she dressed and the sound of her voice while holding up a sign of Sheila's face. This may indicate that Frank still has feelings for Sheila, despite their previous marriage being illegal as Frank never got a divorce from Monica before they were to wed.

=== Fiona Gallagher ===
- Played by: Anne-Marie Duff (Series 1–2, 11)

Fiona McBride
- Shameless character
- Portrayed by: Anne-Marie Duff
- Duration: 2004–2005, 2013
- First appearance: 13 January 2004; Series 1 Episode 1 "Meet the Gallaghers"
- Last appearance: 28 May 2013; Series 11 Episode 14 "End of the Line"
- Created by: Paul Abbott
- Introduced by: George Faber
In-universe information
- Occupation: Nursery teaching assistant (2004–05)
- Father: Frank Gallagher
- Mother: Monica Gallagher
- Stepmother: Sheila Jackson (2006–2007)
- Brothers: Lip Gallagher; Carl Gallagher; Liam Gallagher; Ben Gallagher
- Sisters: Debbie Gallagher; Stella Gallagher
- Half-brothers: Ian Gallagher; Nigel Gallagher
- Half-sisters: Delia Gallagher
- Husband: Steve McBride (2008–)
- Children: Unnamed son
- Stepdaughters: Kerry-Anne
- Grandfathers: Neville Gallagher
- Grandmothers: Sarah Gallagher; Joan Dallimore
- Nieces: Katie Maguire
- Other relatives: Nin Gallagher; Iris Gallagher; Barbara Dallimore

Fiona Gallagher (born 20 February 1983) is the eldest child of Frank (David Threlfall) and Monica Gallagher (Annabelle Apsion). She was the acting mother to her five siblings after her mother left due to Frank's lack of responsibility. She is also the best friend of Veronica Fisher (Maxine Peake). During the early episodes, Fiona had a part-time job as a teaching assistant at a local nursery. Fiona appeared in 19 episodes in total.

During her childhood, she used to be referred to by the other kids at school as "Pov Gallagher" due to her family's low income and her parents' perpetual unemployment. Fiona also once claimed to be proud that she was the only girl in her year-group during secondary school not to fall pregnant before taking her GCSEs.

After her boyfriend Steve McBride (James McAvoy) got caught up in a botched drug bust, he had to leave the Chatsworth Estate. Fiona was reluctant to leave with him, as she did not want to abandon her siblings and friends. During his absence, she briefly hooked up with Craig Garland (Chris Coghill) and became pregnant with his child. But she still retained feelings for Steve, and when he returned briefly, he told Fiona that her siblings were more than capable of looking after themselves without her, and that she deserved a better life outside of Chatsworth. With the support of her family and friends, Fiona left with Steve at the end of series 2 and now resides in Amsterdam. In series 8, Libby Croker (Pauline McLynn) mentioned that Fiona was married.

In the final episode of the show, Fiona is called back to Chatsworth by her mother Monica after hearing she has lost a baby. However, she is enraged to discover her mother attempted to abort twins, leaving one–Ben–alive. She is disgusted to find Monica and Frank are neglecting Ben and choosing to let Fiona's six-year-old sister Stella to take care of him. Reminded of her own past as sole parental guidance for her other siblings, as well as overhearing Lip Gallagher (Jody Latham) talk about the mistreatment her younger siblings will receive once Monica gets over the aborted child, Fiona plots to snatch Stella and Ben to free them of the lifestyle she and her younger siblings went through. She leaves the kids with Kev Ball (Dean Lennox Kelly) so that she can contact Steve. However, Stella runs away and takes her brother. When they are found by Frank, he attempts to stop Fiona's plans. She still isn't convinced to leave the kids with her parents after Lip and Carl (Elliott Tittensor) plead with her not to go through with it. Fiona learns from Stella that Frank tried to leave, though he didn't because he had no money and offers her father money to do so. He doesn't take it in favor of staying with his family, and she is convinced of his change. This gives Fiona a newfound respect for her father, since she realises Frank can't abandon his children. After the family reconcile, they party with the other Chatsworth residents in The Jockey. Fiona is said to have been conceived at an all-nighter at Wigan Casino, which wouldn't have been possible as it burnt down before she was conceived.

=== Steve McBride ===
- Played by: James McAvoy (Series 1–2)

Steve McBride
- Shameless character
- Portrayed by: James McAvoy
- Duration: 2004–2005
- First appearance: 13 January 2004; Series 1 Episode 1 "Meet the Gallaghers"
- Last appearance: 8 March 2005; Series 2 Episode 10 "True Love"
- Created by: Paul Abbott
- Introduced by: George Faber
In-universe information
- Occupation: Car thief
- Brothers: Joe McBride
- Wife: Fiona Gallagher (2008–)
- Daughters: Kerry-Anne

Steven "Steve" McBride (born 1979) is Fiona Gallagher's (Anne-Marie Duff) boyfriend. He was first seen in a club, watching Fiona dance with her friend Veronica Fisher (Maxine Peake). When a mugger stole Fiona's bag, Steve gave chase and attempted to catch him. Although he failed, Fiona still took him home. Once back at their house, he admitted (while undoing his trousers) that he had noticed her a month before, and that if she wanted him to stop, he would. She did not, and they went on to have sex. Steve later bought Fiona a washing machine to woo her, and they got together, after Steve revealed he stole cars for a living. In the middle of the second series, he was forced to flee the Chatsworth Estate after he was involved in a murder at drugs deal he was involved in. He later returned for Fiona in the emotional finale of series two. He now resides in Amsterdam with Fiona. He has a daughter named Kerry-Anne from a relationship in his youth. Steve appeared in 13 episodes overall.

Steve is from a family of doctors, referring to them as "the medical equivalent of a battery farm". Steve himself had also previously studied to become a doctor before leaving med school after two years.

Steve is often presented as the moral hero of the show. Although a car thief, he proudly claims to have not committed a single violent crime in his life. Similarly, he dislikes the way Frank Gallagher (David Threlfall) treats his children. When Fiona's father Frank struck his son Ian, Steve got him drunk and took him to Calais in the boot of his car.

=== Lip Gallagher ===
- Played by: Jody Latham (Series 1–5, 11)

Lip Gallagher
- Shameless character
- Portrayed by: Jody Latham
- Duration: 2004–2008, 2013
- First appearance: 13 January 2004; Series 1 Episode 1 "Meet the Gallaghers"
- Last appearance: 28 May 2013; Series 11 Episode 14 "End of the Line"
- Created by: Paul Abbott
- Introduced by: George Faber
In-universe information
- Occupation: Architect
- Father: Frank Gallagher
- Mother: Monica Gallagher
- Stepmother: Sheila Jackson (2006–2007)
- Brothers: Carl Gallagher; Liam Gallagher; Ben Gallagher
- Sisters: Fiona Gallagher; Debbie Gallagher; Stella Gallagher
- Half-brothers: Ian Gallagher; Nigel Gallagher
- Half-sisters: Delia Gallagher
- Daughters: Katie Maguire
- Grandfathers: Neville Gallagher
- Grandmothers: Sarah Gallagher; Joan Dallimore
- Other relatives: Nin Gallagher; Iris Gallagher

Phillip "Lip" Gallagher (born 9 January 1988) is the oldest son and second child of Frank and Monica Gallagher. His parents delayed his birth registration for over a year. This is revealed to Lip on his 18th (actually 19th) birthday in series 4. According to his father, his nickname was bestowed upon him owing to him being "a bit of a gobshite." Lip is in a long-term, open relationship with Mandy Maguire (Samantha Siddall). He appeared in 37 episodes overall.

During series 1 he was in a relationship with schoolmate Karen Jackson (Rebecca Atkinson), who dumps him for his own father Frank Gallagher (David Threlfall), causing him to batter Frank in the middle of the street in a rage. He is ballsy, charismatic and never afraid to stand up to anyone, including the feared Maguire family. Lip dates a string of girls throughout the show, even partaking in a sexual affair with Lena Marshall (Brana Bajic), a woman considerably older than he was.

Lip is close to younger brother Ian Gallagher (Gerard Kearns) and was the first person to find out about his brother's homosexuality. Lip keeps it a secret and eventually becomes completely accepting of it. In series 3, Mandy gives birth to Katie but doesn't want to involve Lip with the baby as she believes he will walk out on them. That same night Lip takes his blame on Frank and accidentally insults Debbie in the process.

He is highly intelligent, takes 10 GCSEs, and eventually accepts an offer from Nottingham University in the last episode of Series 4. In the first episode of series five he returns to the estate during his university break to see Mandy and Katie. His secret girlfriend from university, Alex, decides to make a trip to the Chatsworth Estate. This costs Lip his relationship with Mandy after getting into a bar fight as well as realising Lip is embarrassed of his daughter and ends up kicking him out of the Gallagher home. In the tenth episode of Series 7, Mimi Maguire (Tina Malone) takes Katie to Brighton to visit Lip. It is revealed that he has finished university, acquired a new job in London where he is now working as an architect, and would have been engaged to be married to Mandy. Mimi decides that it is best to leave Katie in the care of her father.

Jody Latham confirmed on Twitter that he would return to the show in the season 11 finale. It was also said that he lived in the area but never visited because he did not want daughter Katie living near or knowing Frank and the Chatsworth Estate. In his meeting with his father, he is still hostile to him but begrudgingly lets his daughter come with him to his old home. He meets his youngest sister Stella for the first time. Eventually, he falls back into his days of his youth and starts to see he can't lie to his daughter after Frank reveals the truth.

He returns in the series finale, along with Fiona and Carl where they arrive for the birth of their new brother Ben. He tries to plead with Fiona to stop her choice, since they turned out fine with or without their parents. He watches Fiona hand Frank money to leave however, the latter refused to take it as Lip sees that he couldn't live without his family and is pleased to see this side. In the end, he makes amends with his family and partakes in their activities.

=== Katie Gallagher ===
- Played by: Lola & Macy Yoxall (Series 3–7) / Bethany Thompson (Series 11)

Katie Maguire
- Shameless character
- Portrayed by: Lola & Macy Yoxall (Series 3–7); Bethany Thompson (Series 11)
- Duration: 2006–2010, 2013
- First appearance: 17 January 2006; Series 3 Episode 3 "Baby"
- Last appearance: 16 April 2013; Series 11 Episode 8 "Grandaddy Gallagher"
- Created by: Paul Abbott
- Introduced by: George Faber
In-universe information
- Occupation: Student
- Father: Lip Gallagher
- Mother: Mandy Maguire
- Grandfathers: Frank Gallagher; Paddy Maguire
- Grandmothers: Monica Gallagher; Mimi Maguire
- Uncles: Ian Gallagher; Carl Gallagher; Liam Gallagher; Ben Gallagher; Nigel Gallagher; Jamie Maguire; Shane Maguire; Micky Maguire; Donny Maguire; Joey Maguire; Fergal Maguire
- Aunts: Fiona Gallagher; Debbie Gallagher; Stella Gallagher; Delia Gallagher; Cilla Tutton
- First cousins: Connor Maguire
- Other relatives: Ruby Hepburn; Neville Gallagher; Nin Gallagher

Katie Gallagher (also Maguire) is the daughter of Lip Gallagher (Jody Latham) and Mandy Maguire (Samantha Siddall), who is born in the third episode of the third series. She is initially believed to be the daughter of Lip's half-brother Ian Gallagher (Gerard Kearns), who is secretly gay and Mandy pretended to be his girlfriend while having a sexual relationship with Lip.

Katie is born after a heavily pregnant Mandy is knocked over during a robbery at the local shop. Mandy's protective parents, Paddy (Sean Gilder) and Mimi (Tina Malone), forbid the Gallaghers from having anything to do with Katie, with the Maguires intent on raising the baby. However, Mandy decides to begin a serious relationship with Lip in order for Katie to have both her parents in her life, so she moves in with the Gallaghers, to the disappointment of Paddy and Mimi. Mandy later reveals that she named Katie after Mimi, with her first name actually being Katherine. Lip eventually moves to Nottingham in order to go to university, leaving Mandy and Katie with the other Gallaghers. After Lip's father, Frank Gallagher (David Threlfall), leaves ecstasy pills lying around, Mandy is terrified that Katie has swallowed some, however this turns out to be a false alarm.

In Series 6, Mandy later begins a relationship with Joe Pritchard (Ben Batt), who begins to mentally abuse Mandy before starting to beat her. When this is revealed, Mandy's older brother Jamie Maguire (Aaron McCusker) brutally attacks Joe, with Mimi confessing to the attack in order for Jamie to remain out of prison. Frank and Jamie's wife, Karen (Rebecca Atkinson), desperately try and make Mandy see that what Joe is doing is wrong, with Mandy agreeing to end the relationship for Katie's sake. Unbeknownst to Mandy, but Karen has begun an affair with Joe. After Paddy is kidnapped and forced to take heroin by a woman named Maureen, she is still intent on revenge for Paddy getting her daughter hooked on drugs which eventually led to her death. Maureen contacts Mandy to come over to her house, where Mandy realizes who Maureen is and a physical scuffle ensues. Maureen then causes an explosion just as Paddy and Mickey Maguire (Ciarán Griffiths) arrive, instantly killing Mandy and Maureen. Katie is seen attending Mandy's funeral in Paddy and Mimi's care.

In Series 7, Mimi decides to take Katie to Nottingham so that Lip can look after her and help her through the grief of losing Mandy at such a young age. Katie is not seen or mentioned again until the eleventh and final series, where Frank is seen pulling faces at a young girl on the bus. The girl then leaves the bus and straight into the arms of Lip, revealing that she was Katie. Katie, now 9 years old, is excited to see Frank, after being informed by Lip that he had been captured by the Taliban. She instantly gets on well with her aunt, Stella Gallagher (Nikita Brownlee), who is three years her junior. Due to lacking a mother figure in her life since Mandy's death, Katie dresses like a boy and always has her hair tied back, which confuses Mimi, who attempts to persuade Katie to wear dresses. Lip and Frank both tell Katie that she does not need to do anything that makes her feel uncomfortable, so she stops wearing dresses. Katie flees when Lip is beaten up in an alleyway, and shortly after this, Lip and Katie leave Chatsworth again to continue their lives as before.

=== Ian Gallagher ===
- Played by: Gerard Kearns (Series 1–7)

Ian Gallagher
- Shameless character
- Portrayed by: Gerard Kearns
- Duration: 2004–2010
- First appearance: 13 January 2004; Series 1 Episode 1 "Meet the Gallaghers"
- Last appearance: 11 May 2010; Series 7 Episode 16 "Gang Wars"
- Created by: Paul Abbott
- Introduced by: George Faber
In-universe information
- Occupation: Barman; Shop assistant
- Father: Gary Bennett
- Mother: Monica Gallagher
- Adoptive father: Frank Gallagher
- Half-brothers: Lip Gallagher; Carl Gallagher; Liam Gallagher; Ben Gallagher; Sean Bennett
- Half-sisters: Fiona Gallagher; Debbie Gallagher; Stella Gallagher
- Grandmothers: Joan Dallimore
- Nieces: Katie Maguire

Ian Gallagher (born 11 February 1989) is the third oldest Gallagher sibling and is aged 15 at the beginning of the first series in 2004. He is the son of Monica Gallagher (Annabelle Apsion) and Gary Bennett, revealed when his blood group was found to be incompatible with the rest of his siblings'. His half-brothers are Lip Gallagher (Jody Latham), Carl Gallagher (Elliott Tittensor), Liam Gallagher (Johnny Bennett), Sean Bennett and 3 unnamed sons of Gary Bennett, while his half-sisters are Fiona Gallagher (Anne-Marie Duff), Debbie Gallagher (Rebecca Ryan) and Stella Gallagher (Nikita Brownlee). He has one niece, Katie Maguire and through Fiona a nephew. He used to work at The Jockey as a barman but in more recent series his employment, if he has any, has not been shown. Ian appeared in 80 episodes overall.

In the early series, Ian is depicted as closest to his brother Lip, with whom he shares a room, and is initially the only member of his family to know that he was gay. The brothers often have to look out for each other more than any of the other characters, due to being party to each other's secrets. In later series, all the family, except Frank Gallagher (David Threlfall), are aware of his sexuality. However, it was often implied Frank knew all along but didn't care and accepted Ian for who he was.

Ian often identifies as gay, having various relationships with older men throughout the first four or five series. Kash Karib (Chris Bisson) was his only long-term boyfriend, though he has a brief relationship with Sean Bennett, and an ongoing friendship, sometimes sexual, with Micky Maguire (Ciarán Griffiths). Because he is unaware of his parentage at the time, Ian also unknowingly sleeps with his half-brother. Ian sees Sean Bennett at their biological father's funeral and later tells the truth to Sean, who wants to keep seeing Ian, but eventually agrees that they can not ignore their familial relationship. Beginning in the fourth series, Ian has a number of relationships with women. He repeatedly has sex with a girl he is briefly hiding in his home for her protection, but when she asks him to leave with her, he declines, knowing a relationship would not work. He has a relationship of convenience with Mandy Maguire (Samantha Siddall), to protect his secret, which nearly turns sexual when they're both at a low point, but they fumble about until Ian decides it's a bad idea. In the seventh series, Ian begins a serious relationship with Maxine Donnelly (Joanna Higson). When Maxine's brother, Bruce (Philip Hill-Pearson) asks if their being in a relationship means Ian is now "bisexual", Ian pauses, before saying he just believes he has found the right person.

Due to Gerard Kearns break to work on a film, Ian leaves in the first episode of the 6th series after suffering amnesia. He is seen in episode two in a clip of him partying abroad and appears on webcam in later episodes. He returns in the seventh episode; this features the debut of Danny, a deaf teenager whom Ian unwittingly transports back to the UK in the boot of his car. Ian now lives in the house of Danny's deceased grandfather, which was leased to him by Danny's Aunt Pegg, in gratitude for looking after him. Danny and Pegg later move to Spain he later lets Mickey move in with him.

In Series 7, it appears Ian has remained at Danny's old address and has accepted Micky as a tenant. Ian supports Carl's girlfriend Maxine when she decides to have an abortion and break up with Carl. Maxine moves in with Micky and Ian. The situation becomes complicated when Maxine asks Ian to pose as her boyfriend to impress her parents. Ian and Maxine begin to develop feelings for each other and have sex. Micky sees them and tries to convince Ian he shouldn't be with a woman, but Ian says the labels don't matter, he wants to be with Maxine. This leads to a major falling out with Micky, who feels betrayed. Micky tells Carl, who then beats up Ian in the toilets at The Jockey before Frank breaks it up. In spite of the remaining tensions, Ian and Maxine become a couple.

Even with the lingering animosity from Carl and Micky, Ian and Maxine are happy but they are thrown into turmoil when Carl, along with Chesney Karib (Qasim Akhtar), runs away after being accused of murder. Ian is initially not bothered with Carl's absence, and is more concerned at just how concerned Maxine is over Carl. When Ian and Maxine are in The Jockey, Maxine confronts Jimmy, whom everyone knows is the killer. As Ian looks on, Jimmy's sister hits Maxine in the head with a pool cue. Ian feels ashamed that he let Maxine fight the battle on her own and in spite of her reassurances, he begins to believe that she would have been better off with Carl. To try to prove his worth, Ian attempts to tape a confession from Jimmy, but Jimmy sees through his plan and savagely beats him. Ian begins to further withdraw and is unable to have sex with Maxine; during the time they do spend together, he becomes more paranoid about her feelings every time she mentions Carl. Carl's name is soon cleared and he attempts to make amends with Ian, but Ian isn't interested. He again accuses Maxine of wanting to be with Carl, to which she tells Ian she just doesn't want to be with him. In spite of this conflict, Ian and Maxine still have strong feelings for each other, and Carl convinces Maxine that she and Ian belong together. Ian shows up at hospital soon after Carl and Maxine talk, and he and Maxine smile at each other, and they reconcile.

In the finale of series 7, Ian and Maxine were returning home after a night out, when they are accosted by a ruffian who attempts to mug them. But they fight back and overpower the thug, and drag him back unconscious to their house. The thug turns out to be a hireling of Roscoe, a Moss Side-based crime lord. After hours of deciding what to do with him, Maxine overhears a conversation where Ian admits that he would "rather fuck him than kill him". This seems to be the end of the relationship, as Ian's sexuality might turn out to be the source of future infidelities. When Ian prepares himself to kill the thug, Maxine and he find that he escaped from his bonds while they were conversing. Ian is seen later with a backpack, apparently leaving Chatsworth. It is not stated whether it is because he is leaving Maxine or if it is to avoid retribution by Roscoe's gang. He happens upon Karen Maguire (Rebecca Atkinson), as she and Joe Pritchard (Ben Batt) are about to leave Chatsworth themselves. After witnessing Joe's abusive treatment of Karen, Ian stows away in the boot of Joe's car. After Joe tries to beat and abuse Karen, Ian kills him and makes his exit from the show to dispose of the body.

In a later episode in series 8, Carl is shown to get a "Happy Birthday" text from Ian. In the final episode of the show, Lip mentions that Ian is engaged to a transsexual.

He is proficient in flying a jetpack.

=== Debbie Gallagher ===
- Played by: Rebecca Ryan (Series 1–6)

Debbie Gallagher
- Shameless character
- Portrayed by: Rebecca Ryan
- Duration: 2004–2009
- First appearance: 13 January 2004; Series 1 Episode 1 "Meet the Gallaghers"
- Last appearance: 12 May 2009; Series 6 Episode 16 "It's Over"
- Created by: Paul Abbott
- Introduced by: George Faber
In-universe information
- Occupation: Soldier
- Father: Frank Gallagher
- Mother: Monica Gallagher
- Stepmother: Sheila Jackson (2006–2007)
- Brothers: Lip Gallagher; Carl Gallagher; Liam Gallagher; Ben Gallagher
- Sisters: Fiona Gallagher; Stella Gallagher
- Half-brothers: Ian Gallagher; Nigel Gallagher
- Half-sisters: Delia Gallagher
- Grandfathers: Neville Gallagher
- Grandmothers: Sarah Gallagher; Joan Dallimore
- Nieces: Katie Maguire
- Other relatives: Nin Gallagher; Iris Gallagher

Deborah "Debbie" Gallagher (born 27 January 1993) is the fifth Gallagher sibling. She is Frank (David Threlfall) and Monica Gallagher's (Annabelle Apsion) second eldest daughter. Lip (Jody Latham), Carl (Elliott Tittensor) and Liam (Johnny Bennett) are her brothers. Her sisters are Fiona (Anne-Marie Duff) and Stella (Nikita Brownlee); her half-brothers are Ian (Gerard Kearns) and Nigel; and her half-sister is Delia. Although Debbie is only 16 (at the time of her last appearance on the show in 2009), she is old beyond her years because she grew up without a mother and undertook the majority of the domestic tasks, At the start of the series Debbie tended to use her childlike innocence to get out of any mess she or family get themselves into. Since Fiona went to Amsterdam, Debbie is often tasked with saving the family from ruin. For example, she steps in when Liam denounces God and the school he attends makes a move to expel him. Although the results are disastrous, she shows herself to be a diligent individual upon whom her family can depend. Originally Debbie was presented as a slightly unusual and awkward child, she retains her high intelligence and resourcefulness throughout the show. This allows Debbie to be successful when she becomes head of the household and takes care of the domestic duties such as cooking, ironing, cleaning and taking Liam to school. She also provides her family members with a high level of emotional support. As a consequence, Debbie missed out on socialising and has become mature beyond her years. When Fiona left Chatsworth at the end of series 2, Debbie seemed, at first, to relish the responsibility of running Gallagher household. Debbie appeared in 65 episodes in total.

In series one, Debbie abducts a three-year-old boy because she "wanted a girl, but none of the girls on the estate would take the chocolate". So she dressed him up in girls clothes. The child's disappearance caused the majority of the estate to go up in arms in search of young "Jody". When Debbie finally admits her actions to her family, a furious and bewildered Fiona, Steve McBride (James McAvoy), Lip, and Ian, formulate a plan to return the youngster back to his family without incriminating Debbie. After circulating false rumours of sightings around the Chatsworth Estate for much of the day, Debbie emerges as the hero of the hour when she returns the boy to his distressed family.

Debbie's closest familial relationship is with her father, Frank. Unlike Fiona, Lip, Ian and Carl, Debbie admires him and often shows her love for him, often seen to be the most affected when he is in danger or trouble. For example, she screams in terror when she believes that Frank's body has been found in a nearby canal. Throughout the series, Frank often lets Debbie down and seems to be unappreciative of her efforts to keep the family together. For example, during some of his drunken rants, he presents himself as being lumbered with children whom he has the sole responsibility of caring for them and seems to forget occasionally what an asset Debbie is to the family. Debbie's feelings of closeness to Frank often leave her the most vulnerable to being let down by him. Debbie's loyalty to her father is occasionally rewarded, and it is strongly suggested that Frank appreciates "Little Debbie" more than anyone else in the world, though that changes when he tells her crush Luke that she sleeps around the estate in hopes she doesn't sacrifice money for charity, and even when Frank tries to do good and give her money for a trip she still refuses to forgive him. Debbie also detests her mother more than the rest of the family, refusing to forgive her for abandoning them years ago or for her continued laziness and self-absorption. She did respond sympathetically when more details became clear regarding Monica's abusive childhood at her mother's hands. In contrast, Debbie was close to Frank's ex-wife, Sheila (Maggie O'Neill).

Debbie's relationship with the rest of her family is generally good. She views her siblings as her dependants and generally supports them through their various misadventures. The rest of her family generally recognises all she does for them. She's particularly protective of and very close to her younger brother Liam. Her relationship with him seems to border between surrogate-parent and partner-in-crime, as she has frequently enlisted Liam's help with some of her past schemes. These include faking Liam's kidnapping when Frank wouldn't admit that he hadn't won the lottery, and she once entered him in a modelling competition, which she wanted to keep a secret from Monica. She can also be seen to forge strong relationships with other characters, notably Marty Fisher (Jack Deam) and Mandy Maguire (Samantha Siddall), she also tends to come up with numerous money-making schemes to provide income.

It is revealed in Series 5 that Debbie has been in a secret relationship with police officer Tom O'Leary (Michael Legge), despite the fact that she is only 15 years old. Debbie and Tom break up at the beginning of series 6 during her 16th birthday party when she realises that Tom is too old for her and that he wants much more from the relationship. Tom begins to stalk her, although he tells workmate Carrie that Debbie has been stalking him.

Debbie is now seemingly in a relationship with a man called Mark, whom she met on a night out with Maxine Donnelly (Joanna Higson) and when she got drunk, he took her back to his student residence to sleep, but nothing more. Debbie left the students' room the next morning, thinking that she'd never see him again. However, at a funeral the family had been invited to, they met again, and she discovered it was his Grandmother's funeral.

At first, Debbie was a little objective to a relationship with him after he made comments about Frank (who had decided to go to the toilet behind a tree at the funeral and then punched Mark) however she told Maxine of her feelings for him. He later appeared outside Debbie's home and when she refused to see him, he sat on a chair in the middle of the road until she did. He later used the chair when a hired gunman was going to kill both Paddy (Sean Gilder) and Mimi Maguire (Tina Malone), but Mark knocked the hitman out with the chair.

After this, Debbie and Mark have sex in on the kitchen floor, reminiscent to the scene in the first episode where Steve and Fiona also have sex in the kitchen, in the same place as Debbie does. Debbie does not return in 2010 for series 7. We find out from Frank's grandmother, who comes to visit, that Debbie has joined the army. At seventeen, Debbie perhaps had no wish to allow her role as the driving force of the Gallagher household hold her back from her potential. Liam, who had been virtually brought up by Debbie since the age of four, has taken on her former role in the Gallagher household or maybe after Child Services incident she realized she was unfit to being a parent figure to her dysfunctional family and joined the Army to find her place.

In episode 11 of series 7, Debbie sends the family a letter telling them she's being sent to Afghanistan. In Episode 1 of Series 8 an army SNCO visits the Gallagher household and reveals that Debbie has been killed in action. This subsequently turned out to be a malicious joke by Frank's ex-wife Monica.

=== Carl Gallagher ===
- Played by: Elliott Tittensor (Series 1–9, 11) / Luke Tittensor (Series 1)

Carl Gallagher
- Shameless character
- Portrayed by: Elliott Tittensor (2004–13); Luke Tittensor (2004)
- Duration: 2004–2013
- First appearance: 13 January 2004; Series 1 Episode 1 "Meet the Gallaghers"
- Last appearance: 28 May 2013; Series 11 Episode 14 "End of the Line"
- Created by: Paul Abbott
- Introduced by: George Faber
In-universe information
- Occupation: Police officer
- Father: Frank Gallagher
- Mother: Monica Gallagher
- Stepmother: Sheila Jackson (2006–2007)
- Brothers: Lip Gallagher; Liam Gallagher; Ben Gallagher
- Sisters: Fiona Gallagher; Debbie Gallagher; Stella Gallagher
- Half-brothers: Ian Gallagher; Nigel Gallagher
- Half-sisters: Delia Gallagher
- Grandfathers: Neville Gallagher
- Grandmothers: Sarah Gallagher; Joan Dallimore
- Nieces: Katie Maguire
- Other relatives: Nin Gallagher; Iris Gallagher

Carl Gallagher (born 18 January 1990) is a fictional character from the Channel 4 drama Shameless; he is the fourth oldest Gallagher sibling. The son of Frank (David Threlfall) and Monica Gallagher (Annabelle Apsion), his brothers are Lip (Jody Latham) and Liam (Johnny Bennett); his sisters are Fiona (Anne-Marie Duff), Debbie (Rebecca Ryan) and Stella (Nikita Brownlee); his half-brothers are Ian (Gerard Kearns) and Nigel; and his half-sister is Delia. Initially he played only a minor role in the show, but since series two has been featured just as much as the other Gallagher children. Carl appeared in 117 episodes in total.

In the first series, Carl was jointly played by Tittensor's twin brother Luke Tittensor, but since the second series he has played the role alone.

In series 3, Carl briefly worked for the Maguires by growing marijuana for them in his loft, until the police found out about the production. Carl was briefly taken into custody, and gave a statement that the marijuana was grown for the household's own personal use. But after a tip was given to the police about Mandy Maguire (Samantha Siddall) selling weed, her mother Mimi Maguire (Tina Malone) suspected that Carl betrayed them and sent her sons, Donny (Clyve Bonelle) and Shane Maguire (Nicky Evans), after him. Later, Carl's siblings Lip, Ian and Debbie, figured out that the only person with the motive for informing the police about Mandy's dealings was in fact her brother Shane, who was angry that his mother chose his sister over him to oversee that area of the family business. After Lip confronted Shane over the matter, Shane agreed to call off the family hunt for Carl.

Carl develops a long tally of sexual conquests in the later series, one notable example being the mother of one girl whom he was dating during his last year of secondary school.

In series 6, Carl realizes Micky Maguire (Ciarán Griffiths) is gay; he is one of the few people on the estate, along with Maxine Donnelly (Joanna Higson), his brother Liam and his half-brother Ian, who is aware of this. Mickey makes several unsuccessful passes at Carl.

Through series 6 and early series 7, Carl pursues and begins a relationship with auxiliary nurse Maxine. Carl breaks up with Maxine after she admits to having aborted his child and feeling he is too immature to be a father. Carl soon decides he wants another chance with Maxine, and is encouraged when she has sex with him in the Jockey toilets. However, he does not know that Maxine only had sex with him to get her mind off Ian, whom she is beginning to have feelings for. Carl proposes to Maxine, but she turns him down. Carl continues to hope until Micky, out of hurt and jealousy, tells Carl about Maxine and Ian. A heartbroken and enraged Carl meets Ian in The Jockey toilets before savagely beating him. He smashes the engagement ring to pieces and cuts all ties to Maxine and Ian.

Carl begins working for Michelle, the head of a male escort agency that Jamie Maguire (Aaron McCusker) briefly worked for; when Jamie no longer wants to have sex with her, an eager Carl is more than capable of taking over the job. Unfortunately, this proves to be the one bright spot for Carl around this time. He and Chesney Karib (Qasim Akhtar) go to a party and afterwards are in the street with a boy named Bonehead, who shows them a video he took of a girl he'd taken advantage of. Her brother, Jimmy, a local tough, viciously attacks Bonehead in front of them, and threatens them into staying silent. When Bonehead dies, Jimmy makes sure they are seen as the prime suspects, and threatens them into fleeing town. Carl and Chesney end up on a farm in Wales, but when Carl is able to get reception for his mobile phone, the messages of support from Maxine and his family move him and he and Chesney decide to return home. They hide in Chesney's shop but when Jimmy again threatens Carl's family, Carl attacks him. Carl even gets a gun to use on Jimmy, but Joe Pritchard (Ben Batt) convinces him this would be a mistake. Ultimately, Joe makes Jimmy disappear, Jimmy's sister clears Carl and Chesney, and the Maguires convince Jimmy's gang to leave the Gallaghers and Chesney alone.

Carl and Ian still have bad blood, with blood literally spilled for Ian as his attempt to tape a confession from Jimmy had ended in a beating. Ian did not accept Carl's apologies for what had happened over Maxine and he drives Maxine away by accusing her of still wanting to be with Carl. Carl visits Maxine at hospital and tells her he knows she was right to have the abortion. He convinces her to give Ian another chance, as he says that he can be her mate, but Ian is her soulmate. Ian and Maxine reconcile, and so do Carl and Ian.

As of series 8, Carl is the only original Gallagher child left, after Liam decided to stay with his mum, and Carl seems to have feelings for best mate Chesney's cousin, Sita Desai (Aysha Kala). He also had sexual relations with her. He proposes to Sita, but she turns him down. He isn't good enough for her. Carl also seems to fancy soon-to-be stepmother Libby Croker (Pauline McLynn), when he starts to get visibly aroused when he looks at her backside and legs.

In series 9, Carl becomes a police officer and leaves Chatsworth to move in with his girlfriend, Clem, thus leaving none of the original Gallagher children (besides Stella) on the estate.

He returns in the series finale, along with Fiona and Lip where they arrive for the birth of their new brother Ben. He tries to plead with Lip on not letting Fiona go with her choice of taking the kids Stella and Ben, since he was closest to Frank. At the end, Carl gets through to his brother and watched Lip plead to Fiona because turned out fine with or without their parents. He watches Fiona hand Frank money to leave however, the latter refuses to take it as Carl sees that he couldn't live without his family and is pleased to see this side. In the end, he makes amends with his family and partakes in their activities.

Carl once bought a guitar that turned out to be cursed with the soul of Blind Willie Johnson.

=== Liam Gallagher ===
- Played by: Joseph Furnace (Series 1–2) / Johnny Bennett (Series 3–8)

Liam Gallagher
- Shameless character
- Portrayed by: Joseph Furnace (Series 1–2); Johnny Bennett (Series 3–8)
- Duration: 2004–2011
- First appearance: 13 January 2004; Series 1 Episode 1 "Meet the Gallaghers"
- Last appearance: 12 January 2011; Series 8 Episode 2 "Missing (Part 2 of 5)"
- Created by: Paul Abbott
- Introduced by: George Faber
In-universe information
- Occupation: Student
- Father: Frank Gallagher
- Mother: Monica Gallagher
- Stepmother: Sheila Jackson (2006–2007)
- Brothers: Lip Gallagher; Carl Gallagher; Ben Gallagher
- Sisters: Fiona Gallagher; Debbie Gallagher; Stella Gallagher
- Half-brothers: Ian Gallagher; Nigel Gallagher
- Half-sisters: Delia Gallagher
- Grandfathers: Neville Gallagher
- Grandmothers: Sarah Gallagher; Joan Dallimore
- Nieces: Katie Maguire
- Other relatives: Nin Gallagher; Iris Gallagher

Liam Gallagher (born 12 March 1999) is the second youngest of the Gallagher children and is a minor character until series 5, when he takes a more central role in the main storylines. He is named after the singer of the same name. He apparently suffered from epileptic fits when he was smaller, although this has never been seen. It was also implied that he used to wet the bed, though he claims that it was only to help put out the fires, which he had a fondness for starting, as seen during his pyromania phase in series 4–5 – matchboxes and lighter-fluid were routinely found under his mattress by his brothers Carl (Elliott Tittensor) and Ian (Gerard Kearns). Throughout the series, Liam is practically raised by his older sisters, Fiona (Anne-Marie Duff) and Debbie (Rebecca Ryan), as his father Frank (David Threlfall) is lazy and mother Monica (Annabelle Apsion) inept- when she is around. In later episodes, Liam shows considerable intelligence and resourcefulness like sister Debbie and is also an outspoken atheist. In series 5, signs of genius in Liam became obvious when he was shown to be an adept car thief, much like Steve McBride (James McAvoy), and was seen later to use a defibrillator on a comatose Frank when it was thought that his heart had stopped. In series 6, it is revealed that Liam is a talented musician, and also fluent in Sign Language. Given his academic performance, the school determines Liam to be an exceptionally gifted pupil, which leads to him being awarded a special scholarship. During an interview at a local university, he initially fails to make a good impression due to nervousness. But that changed when his father Frank attempts to steal the "Joy of Sex" manual from the university library; Liam plucks up the courage to tell the panel of education directors why he deserves the scholarship in an impassioned speech. Liam appeared in 78 episodes in total.

Liam was also persuaded by his brother Carl to create false identities on the internet for him, Chesney Karib (Qasim Akhtar), Maxine Donnelly (Joanna Higson), and Micky Maguire (Ciarán Griffiths), so they would be admitted into an exclusive nightclub.

In series 3, the then five-year-old Liam was almost expelled from his RC primary school when he openly denounced religion during a Christmas nativity play that was held by the school. Debbie learned of this development on New Year's Day 2006 when meeting with Liam's headteacher and a local parish priest. Debbie tried to warn Frank of the situation and the expected visit from the school, but to no avail. On the day of the school visit, and when it was apparent that Frank was not going to help, Debbie had to take matters into her own hands. She shaved Liam's head, and told the school administrators that her little brother had cancer. Unfortunately, the rumour got out of hand, and spread out across the Chatsworth community, until a fundraiser for "Liam Day" was set up by Jez (Lindsey Dawson), the landlady of "The Jockey", ultimately ending it with Liam outing himself at not having cancer.

While apparently an atheist, it was hinted in series 6 that Liam may have had change of perception on the matter, even when he expertly refuted the arguments of two Jehovah's Witnesses, whom Monica tricked into babysitting Liam and Stella (Nikita Brownlee), he stated that "they may not know it, but they're right and I'm wrong". He also tried to get rid of the clothes Debbie and Maxine stole, thinking that they brought "bad Karma". In series 7, Liam quoted from passages in the Old and New Testaments that condoned prostitution when Kelly Maguire (Sally Carman) thought that her occupation would disqualify her as godmother of Karen (Rebecca Atkinson) and Jamie Maguire's (Aaron McCusker) son, Connor. And was seen later with a copy of the Torah when counselling a Jewish convert with a penchant for pork-scratchings. Although knowledgeable about religion, Liam does not appear to endorse nor practice any of them.

Liam is now one of the few people in Chatsworth who is aware of Micky homosexuality. He sarcastically tells Micky that he figured it out through his "amazing powers of deduction", despite Micky's stereotypically gay mannerisms and aesthetic preferences.

In series 7, Debbie has left Chatsworth to join the army, and perhaps due to this, Liam seems to have taken on more responsibility within the household, even getting a job delivering newspapers to support the family. His relationship with Frank has soured to the point that Liam has grown openly contemptuous of his father as he starts to develop more of Debbie's traits, (such as shouting at and attacking Frank and Carl for their antics). Liam now attends a prestigious senior school.

He soon falls for a girl called Holly, whom he meets during his music lessons. Holly takes Liam home to meet her parents, when he tells them his father is a deceased heart specialist. But an accident at school exposes the lie. Despite this, Holly wanted to continue the relationship, but her comments against Frank hurt Liam's feelings, and cause him to leave with Frank.

After the Gallagher household falls behind on their HP payments, Liam gambles at Joe Pritchard's (Ben Batt) shop to raise cash. Despite showing great aptitude early on, Liam ends up losing to Joe's bluff during a game of poker, owing him £100. Unable to come up with the money, Liam desperately asks his drunk father for help. Frank accidentally headbutts him, causing Liam to run out of The Jockey. Later on in the episode, Liam contacts Joe, asking "if I die, would it clear my debt?" Joe hurriedly seeks out Frank, Carl and Ian, who find Liam on top of a building threatening to jump. When a scuffle ensures between his brothers and father, he moves to a different ledge, and throws his phone down. After a heartfelt pledge by Frank to be more supportive, and from Joe to write-off his debt to him, Liam seemingly jumps, but he simply lands onto the balcony 7 feet down, recovers his mobile phone, and holds both Joe and Frank to their promises.

When Carl is framed for the death of a local boy, Liam is instrumental in helping to clear his name and convincing him to come home.

Liam struggles to adjust to Frank's new girlfriend Libby Croker (Pauline McLynn) taking over the mother role in the household. Liam begins to act more hostile towards her than ever. Liam feels that Frank is taking advantage of Libby, as he did with Sheila Jackson (Maggie O'Neill). The family realise why when Carl finds a letter Liam has kept from Debbie which tells them she has been sent to Afghanistan. Liam does a school report on a World War II veteran, Reggie. Slowly they become friends and Liam tries to help Reggie as he has no one to take care of him since being widowed. Carl, Kelly, and Libby all feel suspicious of their friendship, especially when Libby sees Liam wearing a dress (Liam wore one of Debbie's dresses as it reminded him of her smell). Liam defends Reggie, but when Reggie, knowing that he was close to death, desperately hugs him and doesn't want to let go. Liam completely misinterprets Reggie's reasons, and flees the house. However, Liam begins to realise he was wrong about Reggie and returns to apologise and sit with Reggie as he dies.

Liam skillfully plays an acoustic guitar during The Jockey's talent night in episode 12. By then, he seems to have eventually warmed to Libby after she promised him that she would never leave no matter how much Frank might put her off. In various episodes, Liam is seen to adopt Debbie's mannerisms and views in respect of his feelings about religion, figures of authority and the ways in which his family cope with one another. Debbie was Liam's main caregiver and role model since Fiona's departure from Chatsworth in series 2, being the main nurturing influence in his life from the ages of four to ten. Debbie and Liam had such a strong bond with each other, that she would frequently use his help in various activities. It was to Liam whom she addressed the letter to when she was assigned to Afghanistan.

Between Series 7–8, Liam was the remaining Gallagher on the Chatsworth estate that possesses any sense of responsibility and maturity. In series 8, when the family received the news of Debbie's death in Afghanistan, Liam was willing to travel on his own to personally break the news to Fiona. But there was no need, as the news turned out to be a cruel hoax by the returning Monica. When Monica came back, Liam finally confronted his mother on her attitude toward her family. Monica replied that her relationship with his father was "above right or wrong". When Monica left after her deception was revealed, Liam followed her to the bus stop, where her latest Lesbian lover greeted her. Liam realized this was the same person whom earlier dressed as an army NCO to falsely inform them of Debbie's death. Liam attends Frank's stagnight to keep him out of trouble, but the other drunken revellers playfully tie Frank up and leave him in a cemetery, while taking Liam to a brothel and leaving him with a prostitute. Libby is furious when she finds out, but Liam assures her that he didn't have sex. He only paid the girl for her time with him, and won the money back in a game of Three Card Brag. When Frank goes missing after his stag night, Monica demands custody of Liam and Stella. When she came to collect them, Liam forced Monica to take him rather than Stella, otherwise he would make her life difficult. Liam left with Monica after saying he would come back as soon as Monica gets her new house from the council, which was the true reason she wanted Liam and Stella in the first place. In the fifth episode, just before Frank and Libby's wedding, Carl reads a best man's speech written by Liam, which turns out to be a personal message from him. Liam says that he's decided to stay with Monica, saying that she's had a hard life and that he wants to help her love herself, much to the sadness of everyone in attendance. Liam had left the Chatsworth Estate to live with Monica. Although, by Series 11, Monica came to live with Frank, without Liam, indicating that Liam left his mother sometime after the events in Series 8. In the final episode of Shameless, Liam was stated by Lip to be a practicing Buddhist.

=== Stella Gallagher ===
- Played by: Alana & Anabelle Crampton (Series 5–10) / Nikita Brownlee (Series 11)

Stella Gallagher
- Shameless character
- Portrayed by: Alana & Anabelle Crampton (Series 6–10); Nikita Brownlee (Series 11)
- Duration: 2008–2013
- First appearance: 15 April 2008; Series 5 Episode 16 "The Ninth Time Around"
- Last appearance: 28 May 2013; Series 11 Episode 14 "End of the Line"
- Created by: Paul Abbott
- Introduced by: George Faber
In-universe information
- Father: Frank Gallagher
- Mother: Monica Gallagher
- Brothers: Lip Gallagher; Carl Gallagher; Liam Gallagher; Ben Gallagher
- Sisters: Fiona Gallagher; Debbie Gallagher
- Half-brothers: Ian Gallagher; Nigel Gallagher
- Half-sisters: Delia Gallagher
- Grandfathers: Neville Gallagher
- Grandmothers: Sarah Gallagher; Joan Dallimore
- Nieces: Katie Maguire
- Other relatives: Nin Gallagher; Iris Gallagher

Stella Iana Gallagher is the youngest daughter of Frank (David Threlfall) and Monica Gallagher (Annabelle Apsion). She has appeared in a recurring role since May 2008, and appeared on a regular basis in the eleventh and final series. Stella appeared in 15 episodes overall.

Stella is born to Frank and Monica in April 2008, with Monica giving birth next to Frank, who is in a coma during the birth. Like before, Stella's siblings, primarily Debbie (Rebecca Ryan), Liam (Johnny Bennett) and Carl (Elliott Tittensor), look after her, while Frank and Monica continue with their previous disastrous parenting. During Series 6, Monica walks out on the family again, leading to Social Services temporarily taking Liam and Stella into care, however neighbors Yvonne Karib (Kelli Hollis) and Stan Waterman (Warren Donnelly) offer to foster them in order to keep them close to the Gallaghers. When Frank's new partner Libby Croker (Pauline McLynn), her mother Patty (Valerie Lilley) and their relative Aidan (Robbie Conway) move in, all of them look after Stella alongside Liam and Carl, while Frank continues to neglect his children.

By Series 11, Stella is now 6 years old, and is shown to be thoughtful and caring. She and Aidan are the only ones left to contend with Frank's outrageous behavior. She shows great maturity for her age, as she covered for her father after he was in involved in a riot. Stella still loves her father, still calling him "Dad" and taking caring of him when needed. She meets her older brother, Lip (Jody Latham), and gets on well with his daughter, Katie (Bethany Thompson). After Frank begins a three-way relationship with prostitutes Sherilee (Sarah Totty) and Derilee (Sue Vincent), Derilee's husband Baxter arrives at the Gallagher household and holds Frank, Stella and Derilee hostage at gunpoint. While negotiating with Baxter for their freedom, Monica returns to Chatsworth to take Stella's place in the hostage situation, holding no resentment like her other siblings is happy to see her mother. However, Stella ends up running back inside, after her father protects her from a stray bullet with Monica also being held captive. While Derilee and Baxter solve their differences, Frank and Monica have sex, resulting in Monica falling pregnant with twins. She has an abortion, however one of the twins survives, and she gives birth to Ben Gallagher in The Jockey. As Monica feigns bereavement over the baby she "miscarried", and Frank neglecting his newborn son, Stella is forced to take on the role of looking after Ben. Stella's oldest sibling, Fiona McBride (Anne-Marie Duff), returns to Chatsworth with Carl and Lip, and attempt to make Frank and Monica see that their disastrous parenting is only going to damage Stella and Ben. Fiona decides to take Stella and Ben back to Amsterdam with her, leaving her in the care of her old friend, Kev Ball (Dean Lennox Kelly), however he loses them. Stella follows Frank to the bus stop with Ben in her arms, where she claims to her father that she wants to stay with him. However, Frank tells her she should go with Fiona and rages at an upset Stella that she (along with his other children) were a mistake and that she ruined his life, leading to her sadly walk away with her brother. A guilty Frank later finds Stella and Ben at a local park, he tries to apologize for his harsh behavior and after a series of events, he confirms that he does love her, much to her joy. Frank then takes the burden of Stella caring for Ben off her shoulders, while taking an active role himself.

Frank takes them back to the Gallagher household, walking into Fiona and Monica fighting over the upbringing of the two children. Even though Lip and Carl try to convince Fiona otherwise, Fiona refuses to believe they will change and Stella stands up for their father by voicing his stopping himself from leaving the family. Stella watches as Fiona offer Frank money to leave as he intended. However, he refused to take it as she sees that he couldn't live without his family and is pleased to see this side. In the end, Stella and Ben stay in Frank and Monica's care, and remain in Chatsworth.

=== Ben Gallagher ===
"Played by: Unknown (Series 11)

Ben Gallagher
- Shameless character
- Portrayed by: Unknown
- Duration: 2013
- First appearance: 28 May 2013; Series 11 Episode 14 "End of the Line"
- Last appearance: 28 May 2013; Series 11 Episode 14 "End of the Line"
- Created by: Paul Abbott
- Introduced by: George Faber
In-universe information
- Father: Frank Gallagher
- Mother: Monica Gallagher
- Brothers: Lip Gallagher; Carl Gallagher; Liam Gallagher
- Sisters: Fiona Gallagher; Debbie Gallagher; Stella Gallagher
- Half-brothers: Ian Gallagher; Nigel Gallagher
- Half-sisters: Delia Gallagher
- Grandfathers: Neville Gallagher
- Grandmothers: Sarah Gallagher; Joan Dallimore
- Nieces: Katie Maguire
- Other relatives: Nin Gallagher; Iris Gallagher

Ben Gallagher (born 1 December 2013) is the newborn son of Frank (David Threlfall) and Monica Gallagher (Annabelle Apsion), and Frank's tenth child. He is born in the final episode of the eleventh and final series.

He was born in The Jockey. After his birth, he is named Ben by Monica who feigns bereavement over the baby she "miscarried" and neglects him while Frank shows a lack of interest in the child and leaves full care to Stella. Meanwhile, Monica Frank's oldest daughter, Fiona McBride (Anne-Marie Duff), returns to Chatsworth with Carl and Lip. Fiona attempts to make Frank and Monica see that their disastrous parenting is only going to damage Stella and Ben before deciding to take Stella and Ben back to Amsterdam with her, leaving her in the care of her old friend, Kev Ball (Dean Lennox Kelly). However, he loses them as Stella wanted to stay with her father and took Ben with her. Stella follows Frank to the bus stop with Ben in her arms, as Frank rages at an upset Stella that she and Ben were a mistake and that she ruined his life, leading to her sadly walk away alone with her brother. A guilty Frank later finds Stella and Ben at a local park, he apologizes for his harsh behavior and confirms that he does love her and Ben, much to her joy. Frank lets Stella play while he finally takes an active role in caring for Ben by finally holding him and changing him. Frank soon takes them back to the Gallagher household, walking into Fiona and Monica fighting over the upbringing of the two children. He refuses to let Fiona to take his youngest children. Even though Lip and Carl try to convince Fiona otherwise, Fiona refuses to believe they will change and offer Frank money to leave as he intended. However, he refused to take it as she sees that he couldn't live without his family and is pleased to see this side. In the end, Stella and Ben will be fine in Frank and Monica's care, and they remain in Chatsworth. Frank also makes amends with his oldest children who have new respect for him.

=== Neville Gallagher ===
Played by: John Woodvine (Series 2)

Neville Gallagher
- Shameless character
- Portrayed by: John Woodvine
- Duration: 2005
- Appears on: 4 January 2005; Series 2 Episode 1 "Grandad"
- Created by: Paul Abbott
- Introduced by: George Faber
In-universe information
- Mother: Nin Gallagher
- Sisters: Iris Gallagher
- Wife: Sarah Gallagher (1955–1972)
- Sons: Frank Gallagher
- Grandsons: Lip Gallagher; Carl Gallagher; Liam Gallagher; Nigel Gallagher; Ben Gallagher
- Granddaughters: Fiona Gallagher; Debbie Gallagher; Delia Gallagher; Stella Gallagher
- Other relatives: Katie Maguire

Neville Gallagher is Frank Gallagher's (David Threlfall) estranged father who visits Chatsworth in the first episode of series 2.

=== Nin Gallagher ===
Played by: Edna Doré (Series 7)

Nin Gallagher
- Shameless character
- Portrayed by: Edna Doré
- Duration: 2010
- Appears on: 26 January 2010; Series 7 Episode 1 "Perfectly Frank"
- Created by: Paul Abbott
- Introduced by: George Faber
In-universe information
- Husband: Jonty (until 2010)
- Sons: Neville Gallagher
- Daughters: Iris Gallagher
- Grandsons: Frank Gallagher
- Other relatives: Fiona Gallagher; Lip Gallagher; Carl Gallagher; Debbie Gallagher; Liam Gallagher; Nigel Gallagher; Delia Gallagher; Stella Gallagher; Ben Gallagher; Katie Maguire

Nin Gallagher is Frank Gallagher's (David Threlfall) grandmother who appears in the first episode of series 7 of Shameless. She apparently brought Frank up and rescued him from a life of misery at the hands of her son Neville (John Woodvine), Frank's father. She is somewhat resentful of Frank, calling him a "selfish little shit". She is close to all of his children, especially her great-grandson Liam Gallagher (Johnny Bennett). She is the carer for her husband Jonty, who does nothing but eat. Out of desperation, she shoots Jonty dead in front of Frank and willingly goes to prison for it. She is last seen when she is visited by Liam and Ian Gallagher (Gerard Kearns), and appears to be loving prison life, deliberately causing a prison riot to extend her sentence as she wants to spend the rest of her life in prison.

== The Maguire family ==
=== Paddy Maguire ===
- Played by: Sean Gilder (Series 2, 3, 4–7)

Paddy Maguire
- Shameless character
- Portrayed by: Sean Gilder
- Duration: 2005–2010
- First appearance: 8 February 2005; Series 2 Episode 6 "Welcome to the Family"
- Last appearance: 20 April 2010; Series 7 Episode 14 "Secret Relations"
- Created by: Paul Abbott
- Introduced by: George Faber
In-universe information
- Occupation: Drug dealer Gangster
- Father: Padraig Maguire
- Mother: Consumpta Maguire
- Brothers: Noel Maguire
- Sisters: Mags Maguire
- Wife: Mimi Maguire (2010)
- Sons: Donny Maguire; Fergal Maguire; Joey Maguire; Micky Maguire; Shane Maguire
- Daughters: Mandy Maguire
- Adoptive sons: Jamie Maguire
- Granddaughters: Katie Maguire
- First cousins: Arlene

Patrick "Paddy" Maguire is the patriarch and the head of the Maguire family, the most feared and therefore most respected of the local criminal families. His cherished wife is Mimi (Tina Malone), and he has an identical twin brother called Noel (Sean Gilder), who is gay. He also has a sister, Mags, who lives as a nun in Zambia. It was shown in Series 6 that he is a supporter of Celtic F.C. and in the background at the Maguire residence there is a statue of a Celtic player, who looks similar to the old Celtic captain, Bobby Lennox. Paddy appeared in 52 episodes in total.

Paddy is extremely aggressive and violent and his presence puts fear into most people on the Chatsworth Estate. For example, when he and his family enter the local pub, The Jockey, the customers sitting at the table beside the entrance clear the seat for them. He and his family are also drug dealers on the Chatsworth estate. He has a particular dislike for the Gallagher family, particularly Frank (David Threlfall) and Lip Gallagher (Jody Latham), which he has demonstrated on several occasions, both physically and verbally. However, in more recent series, Paddy has begun to show a more compassionate side, and since series four, he has also become much more accepting of Lip, as well as Karen Jackson (Rebecca Atkinson), the wife of his oldest son Jamie (Aaron McCusker). Paddy's identical twin brother Noel was credited as being played by Neil Grades, an anagram of actor Sean Gilder. Paddy also has a strong sense of family and is loyal toward them. For example, when his daughter-in-law Karen becomes severely depressed he becomes the rock upon which she can lean.

Despite his initial dislike of Frank, this mindset was then turned after Paddy choked on a cashew nut in The Jockey and Frank performed the kiss of life, thus saving Paddy's life. Frank also saved Paddy's life again, stopping him from injecting himself with what would have been a lethal dose of heroin. Paddy now has some grudging respect for the Gallaghers.

Despite showing open contempt for higher education, Paddy has occasionally shown knowledge of certain literary subjects.

In Series 6, Paddy was briefly abducted by the mother of a teenager who died after using his drugs, who in revenge repeatedly injected Paddy with heroin, causing him to become addicted to the substance. His attempts to conceal his new habit and deal with its effect on his life were a recurring theme of Series 6, with him finally going cold turkey later in the series, during which he had visions of his father Padraig. His mother's gravestone is shown in Series 6.

In addition to the visions of his father, Paddy fantasizes about sleeping with Karen and Kelly Maguire (Sally Carman), who are both his daughters-in-law.

In series 7, Paddy's marriage to Mimi is near enough over, due to the fact that his affair with Maureen results in the tragic circumstances of the series 6 finale, in which daughter Mandy Maguire (Samantha Siddall) is murdered in an explosion. Separated, living in separate houses and each given the freedom to see other people, Paddy takes a night out with sons Jamie, Shane (Nicky Evans) and Micky (Ciarán Griffiths) as an opportunity to restart his love life with a meaningless one-night stand with a female clubber. When he can't "pull", he returns home, alone and defeated, and is greeted by Kelly. After a short conversation, Paddy hands Kelly an amount of money, in exchange for sex. Kelly accepts this money, and they have sex in the living room, while Kelly's boyfriend and Paddy's son Shane look all over the nightclub for him. Later on in the episode, an awkward Paddy and Kelly exchange moments, in which Paddy offers Shane and Kelly the master bedroom of the Maguire house, out of guilt. Sometime later, Kelly rejected Shane's marriage proposal, as she could not marry him after lying to him. Shane insisted he would forgive her anything, no matter whom she had slept with, but the guilty looks between Paddy and Kelly made him realise what had happened between them. Paddy was so ashamed of his actions that he was willing to inject himself with heroin at Shane's request, but Shane stopped him at the last minute. Paddy then attended Shane's and Kelly's wedding.

Paddy starts a relationship with a dance enthusiast named D'reen (Cathy Murphy), and makes plans to emigrate to Cuba with her. When he realises that he cannot leave his family and business, Paddy puts a stop to his plans, and shares one last dance with D'reen before she leaves.

Paddy begins applying heavy pressure on Jock, the owner of the boxing club, who had borrowed heavily from the Maguires. Meanwhile, he relentlessly belittles Micky when he wants to join the fire brigade. Micky's self-confidence falls through the floor and he berates Paddy for always putting him down. Paddy's belligerence towards Jock leads Jock to set himself and the club on fire. Micky risks his life to save Jock. When Jock is in hospital, Paddy reveals that he had been a young boxer at the club; he had real potential to use his skills to get a better life, but Jock essentially sold him to a crime family. Micky reveals to Paddy that he lied about passing his fire test. Paddy tells Micky it doesn't matter, Micky is still more of a man than he will ever be.

On 6 March 2010, it was announced that Sean Gilder had quit Shameless after five years with the show because of his rumored dislike of Tina Malone who portrays Mimi. He departed Shameless at the end of Series 7, Episode 14.

After Paddy's departure, Mimi gives birth to her eighth child, Cilla. It is unclear whether or not Paddy has died. Frank utters the words, at one point in the show: "I never thought I would say this, but bring back Paddy Maguire!" Although, in the same episode, Joe Pritchard (Ben Batt) implied to Karen that Paddy was killed after returning to Ireland. In episode 14 of series 8 a coffin is carried through the estate, supposedly with Paddy inside, but it turns out this was Paddy's way of smuggling guns to the rest of the Maguires. Jamie tells Kelly that Paddy's plan was to make the police think he was dead, so he could start again, and that he is now living in Thailand.

=== Mimi Tutton ===
- Played by: Tina Malone (Series 2, 3, 4–11)

Mimi Tutton
- Shameless character
- Portrayed by: Tina Malone
- Duration: 2005–2013
- First appearance: 8 February 2005; Series 2 Episode 6 "Welcome to the Family"
- Last appearance: 28 May 2013; Series 11 Episode 14 "End of the Line"
- Created by: Paul Abbott
- Introduced by: George Faber
In-universe information
- Occupation: Drug dealer Barmaid; Acting landlady
- Brothers: Kenny Hepburn
- Sisters: Bobbi Hepburn
- Husband: Paddy Maguire (2010); Billy Tutton (2011–)
- Sons: Donny Maguire; Fergal Maguire; Jamie Maguire; Joey Maguire; Micky Maguire; Shane Maguire
- Daughters: Mandy Maguire; Cilla Tutton
- Grandsons: Connor Maguire
- Granddaughters: Katie Maguire
- Nieces: Ruby Hepburn
- First cousins: Concepta; Shirley

Margaret Harmonica Joy Catherine "Mimi" Tutton (also Maguire) is the brash, foul-mouthed, and violent matriarch of the Maguire family. She is the wife of Paddy Maguire (Sean Gilder), mother of Mandy Maguire (Samantha Siddall) and Cilla Tutton and the Maguire boys, Jamie (Aaron McCusker), Shane (Nicky Evans), Micky (Ciarán Griffiths), the late Fergal and the little seen Joey (Will Willoughby) and Donny (Clyve Bonelle), and the daughter of "Nana" Murphy. Her ex-boyfriend is also named Paddy. She is also a drug dealer on the Chatsworth Estate and is frequently seen doing so on the show. She is extremely violent, easily angered and arguably more intimidating than her husband, Paddy; though as the series progresses she becomes less hotheaded. She has head-butted several characters on the show including Lip Gallagher (Jody Latham), Sue Garland (Gillian Kearney), Cassie Western (Moya Brady) and even her own son Shane and strike fear into the likes of Frank Gallagher (David Threlfall), Lip, Ian Gallagher (Gerard Kearns), Carl Gallagher (Elliott Tittensor), Debbie Gallagher (Rebecca Ryan), Carol Fisher (Marjorie Yates), Karen Maguire (Rebecca Atkinson), and her own children. Even Paddy has been shown to be afraid of her on several occasions. Mimi is as hard as nails, and she can hold her own with men and women. At one point during Series 3 a whole riot squad is needed to restrain her after she attempts to free her daughter Mandy from incarceration at the police station. Mimi appeared in 111 episodes overall.

In series 5 a more sensitive side to Mimi is shown after her ex-boyfriend, Paddy, makes a crass comment about her weight. She describes herself as a "bulimic who can't stand vomit". In the same series, she is shown attending anger management classes. In Series 6, Mimi experiences some regret over her lack of education when son Micky takes film classes. Mimi does most of his coursework for him, and when he decides the class isn't for him, he allows Mimi to take his place.

Mimi is presented as a character who behaves in ways which are polar opposites. For example, she is shown to be a devout Catholic, yet has no qualms about selling drugs to children and behaving in such a manner which will strongly go against the Catholic teachings. However, she also has strong maternal instincts and shows compassion for others. For example, when Chesney Karib (Qasim Akhtar) reacts badly after consuming drugs, she and Paddy care for Chesney by feeding him and ensuring that he sobers up safely. Later, when Yvonne Karib (Kelli Hollis) accuses Mimi of being an intolerant racist, Mimi retorts by describing the racism that Paddy faced when he arrived in England from Ireland. Yvonne and Mimi realize that they share love for their own children and would do anything to ensure their happiness. Also, Mimi is someone upon whom Libby Croker (Pauline McLynn) can depend when she seeks advice or assistance.

The Maguire family's drug dealing business comes back to haunt them when Mimi's beloved Paddy is abducted and forcibly addicted to heroin by the bereaved mother of one of their deceased customers. To make matters worse, she is arrested for an assault that her son Jamie carried out. However, she freely states that she wants to take the blame for the attack, claiming "A mam's gotta do what a mam's gotta do". This is because she does not want to see her ex-con son go to jail again. At the end of series 6, her beloved daughter Mandy is killed by the woman who got Paddy addicted to heroin. The strain of this loss causes Paddy and Mimi to split up.

In series 7 Mimi lives in The Jockey as landlord and has an affair with a friend of her son Micky named Billy Tutton (Michael Taylor), until she finds out that he is only fourteen years old, although he looks just as old as Micky. After the boy starts to blackmail Mimi into a secret relationship, Mimi tries to threaten him to keep him away from her, finally giving him a gun filled with blanks and daring him to shoot her. When he pulls the trigger, she pretends to be dead, and he flees Chatsworth, believing he has killed her.

Mimi attempts to join a local women's group to find companionship and feel better about herself, but they rebuff her attempts to appear in their risque charity calendar, making her feel fat, unattractive, and worthless. To add insult to injury, they ask Mimi to supply them with some party drugs to help loosen them up before the photo shoot. In revenge, Mimi gives them such potent 'treats' that they begin cavorting around in their underwear, groping each other. Mimi films them and sets up a website to display the shots.

Mimi gives birth to a newborn daughter, later named Cilla, at the end of Series 7 after complaining of stomach pains and nausea which scared her into believing she had started menopause. The baby was presumably fathered by estranged husband Paddy. According to the Shameless website, Mimi will return to living in the Maguire house, with baby daughter Cilla, in Series 8. Mimi initially did not know who Villa’s father is due to her having several one-night-stands after breaking up with Paddy in order to make herself feel wanted again. It is later revealed that Cilla's father is in fact Billy, who returns to Chatsworth to be part of the child's life. At the end of Series 8 the couple marry, despite ongoing controversy and disapproval of much of the family. In Series 9, Mimi forces Billy to have an open relationship because she is worried and too old for him. She ends the open relationship after Billy reveals he does not want an open relationship and only wants to be with her. It is also implied she knew her son Micky was gay all along, after she encourages him to leave the estate with a baby he has saved, which he does.

=== Jamie Maguire ===
- Played by: Aaron McCusker (Series 4–11)

Jamie Maguire
- Shameless character
- Portrayed by: Aaron McCusker
- Duration: 2007–2013
- First appearance: 16 January 2007; Series 4 Episode 2 "New Romances"
- Last appearance: 28 May 2013; Series 11 Episode 14 "End of the Line"
- Created by: Paul Abbott
- Introduced by: George Faber
In-universe information
- Occupation: Gangster; Barman; Drug dealer Pub landlord Businessman
- Father: Adi Blanco
- Mother: Mimi Maguire
- Adoptive father: Paddy Maguire
- Stepfather: Billy Tutton (2011–)
- Half-brothers: Donny Maguire; Fergal Maguire; Micky Maguire; Joey Maguire; Shane Maguire; Kassi Blanco
- Half-sisters: Mandy Maguire; Cilla Tutton
- Wife: Karen Jackson (2007–)
- Sons: Connor Maguire
- Uncles: Kenny Hepburn
- Aunts: Bobbi Hepburn
- Nephews: Tam Blanco; Saul Blanco
- Nieces: Katie Maguire; Thalia Blanco
- First cousins: Ruby Hepburn

Jamie Maguire is the oldest son of the notorious Maguire family, the son of Paddy (Sean Gilder) and Mimi Maguire (Tina Malone), and recently returned after serving a ten-year prison sentence for manslaughter. Much to his parents' disgust, he appeared to be reformed, rejected his family, got a job as a barman at "The Jockey", began training as a probation officer, and became engaged to his Jockey co-worker, Karen Jackson (Rebecca Atkinson). Jamie has a tendency to sleepwalk on occasion. He appeared in 108 episodes in total.

In the last episode of Series 4, Jamie revealed that he had admitted his guilt in order to get parole so that he could hunt down his father's three former cellmates, who were planning to muscle in on Paddy's territory and dispose of him. His new reformed life was a sham to cover his murders of these three men. Karen assumed that his courtship of her was part of this pretence, but Jamie claimed that he really loved her and they were married at the end of the episode.

During Series 5, Jamie does his best to avoid joining the family business. He and Karen take over The Jockey, and things go smoothly until Karen miscarries early in Series 6. She distances herself from him, questioning if she would want to have a child that would grow up in the Maguire family. Eventually, the two separate after Karen refuses put a "Maguire" on the pub's license with her. It is during this time that Karen begins sleeping with Joe Pritchard (Ben Batt), able to break it off with her increasingly controlling lover only after she threatens to lie to the Maguires and tell them he continued to physically abuse Mandy (Samantha Siddall), Jamie's sister. Jamie moves home with Karen, and she soon finds out she's pregnant again, not sure if the father was Jamie or Joe.

Despite being portrayed as one of the warmer of the Maguire family, Jamie has become somewhat of a dark and aggressive character, possibly due to him taking on the family business while his father was going cold turkey when recovering from drug addiction. Jamie is shown to go to extreme lengths to get revenge, sending one such message to Joe, after finding out about Karen's affair with him, by digging up his recently deceased father and leaving him slumped outside of the local shop. He also proves that unlike his two brothers, he is a very effective debt collector and head of the family business, having no qualms about threatening or injuring if it brings results.

Jamie becomes a father in Series 7, but afterward witnesses the gradual mental breakdown of his wife Karen, unaware that the overwhelming guilt and self-loathing she carries is eating away at her inside. After Karen's release from hospital, they fall behind on household bills, and Jamie is finding it difficult to cope with his wife's mental illness. He meets a woman named Michelle while on a night out, and has sex with her in the ladies toilets. Michelle runs a male escort agency, and leaves her card in Jamie's pocket, along with some money. They meet later when Michelle offers Jamie a job. Despite his obvious disgust at the thought of working as a "man-whore", Jamie agrees to the offer. He services Michelle and other women, needing the money as well as some time away from Karen. When Karen begins to suspect an affair, Michelle confesses her love for him, and Paddy uncovers what he's doing and tries to tell him to stop, Jamie finally has enough. Initially Michelle is reluctant to let him go, but when he introduces her to the virile young Carl Gallagher (Elliott Tittensor), she changes her mind.

During this time, Karen has continued her destructive affair with Joe, who seemed to have no concerns about her illness or her erratic behavior. Eventually, Joe announces to Jamie that he's having an affair with his wife, and claims that he is baby Connor's father. As his marriage implodes, Jamie is also trying to deal with a threat to both the family and their business, since his father has left Chatsworth for Ireland.

As series 8 begins, Jamie is in counseling with Karen who has returned with their son. He beats up a cab driver, erroneously believing the man is Joe, and Karen finally admits Joe is dead, although she does not tell him he was murdered while attempting to kill her. She and Connor move back with Jamie into The Jockey as they attempt to make their marriage work. In the meantime, Jamie tricks his brother, Shane (Nicky Evans), into willingly giving up his attempt to run the family business. When Shane finally realises Jamie manipulated him into giving up leading the family business and killing a loan shark, he tells his wife, Kelly (Sally Carman), that Jamie was born for this, "Scammin', schemin' and killin'." Then Jamie finally accepts Karen back into their marital bed, telling her that he "could tape his stiffy to his belly" after watching her all day. In series 8, Jamie is shown to be scared of clowns since he saw one of them choke to death when he was young. This led to his discomfort with Karen's new business as a party clown, which lasted only until a customer attempted to molest her. Luckily, one of the guns Jamie was selling ended up in her bag, and she was able to shoot the customer and get away, leading to Jamie taking the gun back and soothing her in a hot shower.

After losing to Karen in a card game, he agrees to put the pub back in her name, and the couple are seen looking up at the new sign, showing "Jamie and Karen Maguire" as the proprietors of the Jockey.

In Series 9, Jamie acts a spokesman for the estate when the majority of the people who live there are evicted. He later cheats on Karen with Gloria Meak (Angeline Ball). He and a few others become trapped underground after a family job goes wrong; they are eventually saved and it is unclear if his and Gloria's affair will continue.

=== Shane Maguire ===
- Played by: Nicky Evans (Series 3, 4–11)

Shane Maguire
- Shameless character
- Portrayed by: Nicky Evans
- Duration: 2006, 2007–2013
- First appearance: 7 February 2006; Series 3 Episode 6 "In with the Maguires"
- Last appearance: 28 May 2013; Series 11 Episode 14 "End of the Line"
- Created by: Paul Abbott
- Introduced by: George Faber
In-universe information
- Occupation: Drug dealer Gangster
- Father: Paddy Maguire
- Mother: Mimi Maguire
- Stepfather: Billy Tutton (2011–)
- Brothers: Donny Maguire; Fergal Maguire; Joey Maguire; Micky Maguire
- Sisters: Mandy Maguire
- Half-brothers: Jamie Maguire
- Half-sisters: Cilla Tutton
- Wife: Kelly Ball (2010–2013)
- Grandfathers: Padraig Maguire
- Grandmothers: Consumpta Maguire
- Uncles: Noel Maguire; Kenny Hepburn
- Aunts: Mags Maguire; Bobbi Hepburn
- Nephews: Connor Maguire
- Nieces: Katie Maguire
- First cousins: Ruby Hepburn

Shane Maguire is part of the Chatsworth estate Maguire gangster family, the son of Paddy (Sean Gilder) and Mimi Maguire (Tina Malone), the brother of Micky (Ciarán Griffiths), Donny (Clyve Bonelle), Joey (Will Willoughby), and Jamie (Aaron McCusker), as well as the late Fergal and Mandy (Samantha Siddall). Shane, overall, appeared in 114 episodes.

Shane is known for his short and unpredictable temper and limited intelligence, although he was once shown to possess great instincts for shopper's habits during Series 5 when he briefly worked in Yvonne Karib's (Kelli Hollis) off-licence shop. Judging by certain scenes from the fourth to sixth series, the other Maguire boys, except for Jamie, seemed to be taking direction from Shane, in the absence of Paddy and Mimi, which might imply that Shane is the second oldest of the Maguire children. In Series 6 Shane suffers a head injury whilst running a hotel scam with his lover, Kelly Ball (Sally Carman). After coming out of a coma, Shane is left partially paralysed and bed-ridden. Conflict arises between Kelly and Shane's overpowering mother, Mimi, over who will oversee his convalescence. However, with physiotherapy and speech therapy, his condition begins to improve.

After a running a series of wedding scams together, Shane asks Kelly to marry him, but she was hesitant to do so. After they fall out during a party at The Jockey, he tries to make amends. But discovers that weeks earlier, Kelly had sex with his father, Paddy. A heartbroken Shane later asks his father why he betrayed him. Paddy reveals that he felt shamed by his sons for abandoning him during that night, and in a moment of self-pity, paid Kelly for sex to "hurt" his son, but he now deeply regrets it. Shane demands that his father proves how sorry he is, and produces a syringe and a bag of heroin. As Paddy is about to inject himself, Shane stops him just in time. Satisfied with his father's remorse, he quietly leaves Paddy, who breaks down in tears. He is now married to Kelly. They had their impromptu civil ceremony at The Jockey.

While giving a deposit to a sperm bank, Shane learned that he was sterile. Shane was upset at the thought of never having children. His father and brothers tried to help by offering to be sperm donors for Kelly, but she refused. Liam Gallagher (Johnny Bennett) suggested Kelly and Shane raise Shane's niece Katie, but this plan was dashed when her father Lip Gallagher (Jody Latham) decided to take her. Shane was left to look on Liam as a son.

When Carl Gallagher (Elliott Tittensor) and Chesney Karib (Qasim Akhtar) were framed for murder by a local drug-dealer called Jimmy, the Maguires initially decide to remain aloof from the situation, as it was "not their fight". But Jimmy's increasing cockiness revealed in Shane a sense of justice, when he began to openly speak against Jimmy's aggressive antics before taking overt action. When Jimmy tried to set the Gallagher home on fire, Shane stepped in, as he knew Jimmy was afraid to cross the Maguires. The last straw for Shane was when Jimmy promised to harm the family, including Liam. When Paddy elected to remain uninvolved, Shane and Jamie decided to take the law into their own hands despite their father's wishes, and rounded up members of Jimmy's gang, and brutally interrogated them as to Jimmy's whereabouts. Paddy later showed his face, and endorsed his son's proactiveness. Shane and Kelly have also developed a parental bond with Liam to the point where Liam even calls them mum and dad (albeit in jest) as they put him to bed.

In Series 8 Shane attempts to take over the Maguire's business while Mimi is in hospital after suffering a heart attack. Jamie however feels that Shane is not up to the responsibility, and when he sees that Shane has been conned out of a drug deal, Jamie takes control by making Shane believe a gangster tried to have him killed. Jamie then encourages to shoot the gangster dead, not knowing that it was in fact Jamie who arranged for Shane to be left for dead until afterwards. A feud builds up between the two throughout the first half of series 8.

=== Micky Maguire ===
- Played by: Ciarán Griffiths (Series 4–9)

Micky Maguire
- Shameless character
- Portrayed by: Ciarán Griffiths
- Duration: 2007–2012
- First appearance: 9 January 2007; Series 4 Episode 1 "New Beginnings"
- Last appearance: 31 January 2012; Series 9 Episode 5 "Cop Killer"
- Created by: Paul Abbott
- Introduced by: George Faber
In-universe information
- Occupation: Drug dealer Gangster
- Father: Paddy Maguire
- Mother: Mimi Maguire
- Stepfather: Billy Tutton (2011–)
- Brothers: Donny Maguire; Fergal Maguire; Joey Maguire; Shane Maguire
- Sisters: Mandy Maguire
- Half-brothers: Jamie Maguire
- Half-sisters: Cilla Tutton
- Grandfathers: Padraig Maguire
- Grandmothers: Consumpta Maguire
- Uncles: Noel Maguire; Kenny Hepburn
- Aunts: Mags Maguire; Bobbi Hepburn
- Nephews: Connor Maguire
- Nieces: Katie Maguire
- First cousins: Ruby Hepburn

Micky Maguire is a "paranoid, aggressive, violent, homosexual yet homophobe" who is a member of the Maguire family. He is erratic and obsessively licks the side of his mouth, which could be a tic and/or hint of a behavioural disorder. Despite his aggressive, exaggerated personality, he is mentally weak and often runs away at the first sign of trouble. Although his father Paddy Maguire (Sean Gilder) often shows him disrespect and is violent towards him, Paddy still loves his son. Micky is the most idealistic of his family, and the most loyal to his parents. In spite of Paddy's lack of faith in him, Micky was the one who tracked down Paddy after he was shot and left for dead. Micky appeared in 84 episodes in total.

When Micky initiates a brief and casual affair with Ian Gallagher (Gerard Kearns) and falls in love with him, Micky exhibits the fact that he is an eager suitor when he follows Ian around and is very emotionally demanding. Unlike Ian, none of Micky's family are aware of his homosexuality, despite several occasions when Micky has come close to coming out to them, or has daydreams about revealing his homosexuality to his family. In his early appearances, Micky has a dog, Nelson, whom he has been close to for years. Ian is disgusted to learn just how close they had become at one time, and declines to continue a relationship with Micky. By this time Micky is in love with him and wants everyone to know. When Micky is about to tell his family, Ian bursts into the room and tells them about what had happened with Micky and Nelson. Paddy immediately has Nelson put down, deeply upsetting Micky.

The early episodes of the sixth series show Micky attending college to study film. When he reveals to his parents that he wants to pursue further education, Paddy and Mimi (Tina Malone) ridicule him. Later on in the series, Mimi accepts the fact that Micky is going to college and supports her son in his educational endeavours. Unfortunately, Micky struggles with the course and is distracted by an erotic story his professor accidentally slips in with his coursework. Micky decides that his true talents are in erotic writing and gives up his place in the class for his mother, Mimi, who loves film and has always wanted to go to college.

In Series 7, Micky continues to build a friendship with Ian, with whom he shares a house. This series has proved that Micky has a sensitive side, as explained through his dialogue with Ian when Ian became involved with Maxine Donnelly (Joanna Higson). Micky tried to warn Ian that Maxine fancied him, not realising that Ian felt the same way about Maxine. Ian had sex with Micky to get Maxine off his mind, but this didn't help, and he and Maxine had sex, which Micky witnessed. Micky was devastated when Ian insisted, he cared for Maxine and wanted to be with her. Micky told Ian that he'd felt like a freak before he'd had Ian to look up to, and now Ian had taken that away. Relations between Micky and the new couple remained strained, but eventually Micky decided to stop letting the relationship bother him. He told Maxine that all he wanted was that when she finally realises she cannot be happy with a gay man, that she let Ian down gently. Mickey leaves the show during Series 9 after helping a young lady give birth to a baby. But after the lady passes away Micky decides to move away from Chatsworth to look after the baby. When saying goodbye to Mimi as he is on the verge of telling her he is gay she silences him and tells him to keep in contact. Mimi implies that she has guessed he is gay.

=== Mandy Maguire ===
- Played by: Samantha Siddall (Series 1, 2–6, 8)

Mandy Maguire
- Shameless character
- Portrayed by: Samantha Siddall
- Duration: 2004–2009, 2011
- First appearance: 27 January 2004; Series 1 Episode 3 "We're Getting Married"
- Last appearance: 8 February 2011; Series 8 Episode 9 "Maguire Meltdown"
- Created by: Paul Abbott
- Introduced by: George Faber
In-universe information
- Occupation: Barmaid
- Father: Paddy Maguire
- Mother: Mimi Maguire
- Brothers: Donny Maguire; Fergal Maguire; Joey Maguire; Micky Maguire; Shane Maguire
- Half-brothers: Jamie Maguire
- Half-sisters: Cilla Tutton
- Daughters: Katie Maguire
- Grandfathers: Padraig Maguire
- Grandmothers: Consumpta Maguire
- Uncles: Noel Maguire; Kenny Hepburn
- Aunts: Mags Maguire; Bobbi Hepburn
- Nephews: Connor Maguire
- First cousins: Ruby Hepburn

Mandy Maguire is the only daughter of the Maguires, the Gallagher family's neighbours. She is the mother of Lip Gallagher's (Jody Latham) daughter, Katie. Mandy is the daughter of Paddy (Sean Gilder) and Mimi Maguire (Tina Malone), the most feared of the local criminals. She is generally more law-abiding than the rest of her family, but is fiercely loyal to them and can often have a violent and abusive streak. Her brothers are Micky (Ciarán Griffiths), Shane (Nicky Evans) and Jamie (Aaron McCusker), as well as the late Fergal and the little-seen Donny (Clyve Bonelle) and Joey (Will Willoughby). Overall, Mandy appeared in 51 episodes.

She develops a crush on Ian Gallagher (Gerard Kearns) in series 1 because he stuck up for her against their teacher Mr. Hardwick, but sends her brothers after him when he rejects her. She is the second person to find out about his homosexuality. She becomes a close friend to Ian and pretends to date him to keep leering boys away from her, leading to her relationship with Ian's brother Lip.

Mandy conceives Lip's baby, Katie, and after a year or so under the care of the Maguires, takes her away and moves in with the Gallaghers. However, her father Paddy continues to supply her with financial support. She begins an open, long-term relationship with Lip while he is away at university, but finishes with him in series 5 after Lip's secret university girlfriend shows her face, she spends the whole series being rejected by every man she's attracted to until she goes on a blind date with a young man named Dex whom she gives him an E and sleeps with him, until she realizes she might have killed him so she and Karen Maguire (Rebecca Atkinson) try to dispose of the body, and spend the episode horrified with their actions, until Mandy decides to turn herself in without telling them who supplied her the drugs and who assisted her to dispose the body, she then learns Dex wasn't really dead but just passed out from the drugs, Mandy decides to come clean to him only for him to reject her.

In Series 6, Mandy has recently fallen for Joe Pritchard (Ben Batt), an accountant and the captain of a local football team. Mandy's brother, Jamie, even struck up a friendship with Joe, until he discovered that Mandy had been physically abused by him, which led to Jamie savagely assaulting Joe, and sending him into a temporary coma. Despite suffering at Joe's hands, Mandy still retains feelings for him, and resented Jamie's intervention, Danny (Ian's new roommate) gives her a word of advice after he tells her he loves her, which makes her reconsider and then Frank Gallagher (David Threlfall) brings up Katie eventually finding out which makes her decide to break it off with him only for Joe to blackmail her into staying with him, Joe's recovery, Mandy has decided to give him another chance, much to the chagrin of the rest of the Maguires, only for them to make supplemental threats to him, Jamie (cutting his head off), Paddy (shooting him), Shane and Micky (pissing on grapes), Kelly (Sally Carman) (injecting him) and Karen (threatening to tell them that he abusing Mandy (when he isn't), if Joe threatens to tell Jamie of their affair).

In the final episode of Series 6, Mandy was kidnapped by Maureen, an emotionally unstable woman who lost her daughter to heroin and blames Paddy for her death. Mandy realised that Maureen was the person who kidnapped Paddy. As Maureen disappeared to put the kettle on, Mandy followed to see what she was doing, and to her horror, found a broken gas pipe which Maureen had sabotaged. Maureen then returned to the kitchen with matches. Mandy desperately began fighting to get the matches from Maureen just as Paddy and Mickey turned up outside to save her, however they could not gain access into the house. Inside the house, Mandy had fought her way into the hallway and ran towards the door. Just as Micky pressed the doorbell, creating a spark, Maureen lit a match. The gas then ignited, causing the house to explode, killing both Maureen and Mandy and throwing Micky across the street. The episode then cut to Kelly, reading a book to little Katie whilst trying to hold back the tears. Meanwhile, at The Jockey, Mandy's funeral reception was taking place. Micky, who survived the explosion, admitted that he felt responsible for Mandy's death, Karen also felt guilt as she kicked her out of her home, hours before her death and slept with Joe. It was mentioned that Paddy was going to return to Ireland with Mandy's ashes to scatter them, however Frank ended up spilling them across The Jockey.

In Series 8, Mandy briefly appears as an apparition or hallucination to comfort her mother when she has insomnia.

=== Donny Maguire ===
- Played by: Warren Brown (Series 1, 2); Steve Bell (Series 3); Clyve Bonelle (Series 3)

Donny Maguire
- Shameless character
- Portrayed by: Warren Brown (Series 1–2); Steve Bell (Series 3); Clyve Bonelle (Series 3)
- Duration: 2004–2006
- First appearance: 27 January 2004; Series 1 Episode 3 "We're Getting Married"
- Last appearance: 14 February 2006; Series 3 Episode 7 "Act Your Age"
- Created by: Paul Abbott
- Introduced by: George Faber
In-universe information
- Occupation: Gangster; Drug dealer
- Father: Paddy Maguire
- Mother: Mimi Maguire
- Stepfather: Billy Tutton (2011–)
- Brothers: Shane Maguire; Joey Maguire; Micky Maguire; Fergal Maguire
- Sisters: Mandy Maguire
- Half-brothers: Jamie Maguire
- Half-sisters: Cilla Tutton
- Grandfathers: Padraig Maguire
- Grandmothers: Consumpta Maguire
- Uncles: Noel Maguire; Kenny Hepburn
- Aunts: Mags Maguire; Bobbi Hepburn
- Nephews: Connor Maguire
- Nieces: Katie Maguire
- First cousins: Ruby Hepburn

Donny Maguire is the son of Paddy (Sean Gilder) and Mimi Maguire (Tina Malone). He is portrayed as being more thuggish than the rest of his brothers, quite often seen using violence against other people, including electrocution, attempted murder and hands on combat. He appeared in the show on a recurring basis throughout the first three series, whenever his family had problems to deal with on the Chatsworth Estate. He is first seen chasing Ian Gallagher (Gerard Kearns) after being told that he has assaulted his sister Mandy (Samantha Siddall). Mandy later admits to lying, and Donny stops harassing Ian. He is next seen when he is ordered to collect Ian for his parents as he has "impregnated" Mandy. He attends their engagement party at The Jockey, where he gets into a fight with Lip Gallagher (Jody Latham), Kev Ball (Dean Lennox Kelly), Marty Fisher (Jack Deam) and other locals. In series 3, he assists Paddy in tracking down and torturing a deaf teenage boy suspected of robbing the shop, which led to Mandy getting hurt. He later kicks him off a multi-story car park when he uses a paint can to insult the Maguire boys. He is last seen hunting down Carl Gallagher (Elliott Tittensor) after Mimi and his brother Shane (Nicky Evans) think Carl has grassed them up to the police. When his family moved to Chatsworth, Donny was not present and has not been seen since, with no explanation to his whereabouts. The character of Donny seems to have been completely forgotten, along with his brother Joey (Will Willoughby), as his mother Mimi often forgets to mention his name when talking about her kids.

=== Joey Maguire ===
- Played by: Will Willoughby (Series 2)

Joey Maguire
- Shameless character
- Portrayed by: Will Willoughby
- Duration: 2005
- Appears in: 8 February 2005; Series 2 Episode 6 "Welcome to the Family"
- Created by: Paul Abbott
- Introduced by: George Faber
In-universe information
- Occupation: Gangster; Drug dealer
- Father: Paddy Maguire
- Mother: Mimi Maguire
- Stepfather: Billy Tutton (2011–)
- Brothers: Donny Maguire; Fergal Maguire; Shane Maguire; Micky Maguire
- Sisters: Mandy Maguire
- Half-brothers: Jamie Maguire
- Half-sisters: Cilla Tutton
- Grandfathers: Padraig Maguire
- Grandmothers: Consumpta Maguire
- Uncles: Noel Maguire; Kenny Hepburn
- Aunts: Mags Maguire; Bobbi Hepburn
- Nephews: Connor Maguire
- Nieces: Katie Maguire
- First cousins: Ruby Hepburn

Joey Maguire is the son of Paddy (Sean Gilder) and Mimi Maguire (Tina Malone). He appears in only one episode in Series 2, with a minor role. Like his brother Donny (Clyve Bonelle), he is the most short-lived Maguire boy and is also portrayed as nothing more than a thug to retain his family's feared status on the Chatsworth Estate. In his only appearance on the show, he bundles Ian Gallagher (Gerard Kearns) into a car and attends Ian and his sister Mandy's (Samantha Siddall) engagement party, where he is involved in a pub brawl. He is seen briefly at his older brother Jamie Maguire (Aaron McCusker) and Karen Jackson's (Rebecca Atkinson) wedding at the end of series four, singing along with his brothers Shane (Nicky Evans) and Micky (Ciarán Griffiths). He has not been seen or mentioned since.

=== Karen Maguire ===
- Played by: Rebecca Atkinson (Series 1–11)

Karen Maguire
- Shameless character
- Portrayed by: Rebecca Atkinson
- Duration: 2004–2013
- First appearance: 13 January 2004; Series 1 Episode 1 "Meet the Gallaghers"
- Last appearance: 28 May 2013; Series 11 Episode 14 "End of the Line"
- Created by: Paul Abbott
- Introduced by: George Faber
In-universe information
- Occupation: Barmaid; Pub landlady
- Father: Eddie Jackson
- Mother: Sheila Jackson
- Stepfather: Frank Gallagher (2006–2007)
- Half-brothers: Nigel Gallagher
- Half-sisters: Delia Gallagher
- Husband: Jamie Maguire (2007–)
- Sons: Connor Maguire

Karen Maguire (also Jackson) is the daughter of Sheila Jackson (Maggie O'Neill) and her second husband, Eddie Jackson (Steve Pemberton). Nigel and Delia are her half-brother and sister. She becomes estranged from both parents throughout the series. She is Lip Gallagher's (Jody Latham) love interest in series 1, soon his father Frank Gallagher moves in with her & her mother, and at first she’s appalled by him and the idea of living with him, to the point she seduces him into sleeping with her, in the hopes Sheila catches him and kicks him out under the assumption that Frank sexually assaulted her underage daughter, however after the fallout between Frank & Lip, and seeing Sheila show genuine concern for Frank can’t bring herself to tell her mother the truth, She then leaves to stay with her grandmother. In series 2 she returns to Chatsworth, drops out of school to work at the Jockey where she lies about her sexuality to guarantee herself a position and moves out entirely from Sheila's house to live at The Jockey. She is the only other character aside from Frank to appear in every series. Karen appeared in 129 episodes in total.

Karen becomes considerably more mature in series 4, at the end of which she marries the recently freed Jamie Maguire (Aaron McCusker), with whom she co-runs the pub. Series 5 sees her becoming increasingly, albeit grudgingly, more integrated with the Maguire family and their somewhat violent way of life. Karen suffers a miscarriage early in season 6 and very soon after, her changing behavior and the loss of their child starts creating a large rift in their marriage. As she and Jamie argue over shared ownership of The Jockey and other problems, Karen finds herself drawn to her sister-in-law, Mandy's (Samantha Siddall), abusive boyfriend Joe Pritchard (Ben Batt), and has sex with him shortly after Jamie moves out. Joe becomes increasingly controlling, threatening to reveal their affair, and makes a failed attempt to buy out Jamie's portion of The Jockey. During this, the Maguires find out Joe has been physically abusing Mandy, and Jamie is almost sent back to prison after brutally beating him. When Jamie moves back in with Karen, she is able to end her affair with Joe by threatening him that if she claims to the Maguires that he's once again been beating Mandy, they will murder him. The last episode of series 6 reveals Karen to be once again pregnant; however she is unsure whether the father is Jamie or Joe, who laughs and tells her "You belong to me now."

In the first episode of series 7, Karen is two weeks overdue in her pregnancy, and can't wait to have the birth over and done with. When Mimi Maguire (Tina Malone) tells her that sex several times a day could make her waters break quicker, Karen tells that "they've" been "at it" all the time, and flashbacks show that she's been having sex with both Jamie and Joe, implying that her brief affair with Joe from series 6 has continued, despite Karen's often cold attitude towards him. In the same episode, Karen goes into labour after having a brief confrontation with Joe in the empty bar of The Jockey (Everybody else were celebrating at Frank's birthday party). After taunting her, Joe decided to help a scared Karen deliver what could be his son, who would be christened Connor Joseph Maguire. Despite playing happy families with "proud dad" Jamie, Joe tells that she's kidding herself into thinking that she wants Jamie, when she really only wants Joe, branding Jamie "boring". Karen would then engage in risky sex in the Maguires' living room with Joe, nearly being caught out by Paddy Maguire (Sean Gilder). Afterwards, Joe would declare that he loves her and they should be a family. Along with Karen's out of control behavior with Joe, she starts to act strange and starts losing Connor on a regular basis. For example, she hides her baby in a dresser drawer. On the third episode of the 7th series Karen starts to act in a strange manner by becoming obsessed with exercising and thinking that she can start her own fitness business, bouncing on a trampoline outside, going out late at night to buy groceries and putting baby Connor in a wardrobe. Karen's erratic behaviour deteriorates further as she starts ripping wall paper off the walls and playing music at high volume, even attempting suicide by falling from a window at one point. She is saved from her suicide attempt by a quick-thinking Paddy, who shows his sensitive side when he expresses deep care and sympathy for her. Finally, Karen has to be restrained by medics and is placed in a psychiatric unit. Karen is diagnosed with bipolar disorder. When she returns home, she struggles to repair her marriage to Jamie, who is unable to have sex with her because the image of Karen during her breakdown is deeply ingrained in his mind. Jamie, unknown to Karen, begins having sex with other women for money, and to get away from her. Jamie does not derive any pleasure from having sex with other women and is motivated by the financial gain. Eventually he stops prostituting himself when Paddy discovers what Jamie has been up to and tries to be happy with Karen.

As much as Karen is repulsed by the sordid nature of her affair with Joe, she is also drawn to it, and is disappointed when Joe briefly stops seeing her. When he begins going to anger management meetings, Karen repeatedly tries to taunt him, throwing cereal around his shop and offering to resume their fling, but he refuses. Karen, pretending to be Joe's wife, drops into one of his meetings and listens to him as he talks about his attempts to control himself and how much he cares about her and their son.

The uneasy distance between Joe and Karen continues until Joe's father dies. Joe wants to start a new life with Karen and Connor and pushes Karen repeatedly to take Connor and leave Jamie. She also stops taking her medication, with her more erratic personality being closer to Joe than to Jamie. Joe eventually takes matters into his own hands, telling Jamie that he's sleeping with his wife, and he wants her and "their" son. Feeling overwhelmed and unsure of what she wants, she leaves with Joe, warning him that Jamie will kill them. In retaliation, Jamie digs up Joe's dead father, and confronts them outside the store, telling Karen it is her last chance to come home with him, and leaving the body at the side of the building. She stays with Joe, but soon begins to question her choice as she starts taking her bipolar meds again. After some close scrapes, Joe and Karen manage to sneak Connor away from Jamie, and Joe announces they're leaving the Chatsworth estate, although Karen is becoming increasingly unsettled at both the idea of a future with Joe and the feeling that Joe's decided what will happen without giving her a choice. She confides her worries to Ian Gallagher, who sneaks into the trunk of the car right before they leave the estate, worried for Karen and Connor. As Karen's doubts rattle Joe, she is subjected to verbal and finally physical abuse. When Karen attempts to call Jamie, telling Joe this was all a mistake and she had to go home and fix things, Joe begins strangling her. Ian gets out of the trunk, and repeatedly hits Joe in the back of the head while in an act of self defense until he releases her and falls to the ground. Telling Karen to take Connor back and do whatever it takes to make it work with Jamie, he drags Joe's body to the trunk and then drives the car away.

In series 8 Karen returns to speak to Jamie, and they begin going to marital counseling, during which Karen admits that she made a mistake, and tells Jamie that Joe is dead, although not how he died. After several rough sessions in which he makes it clear that he finds it difficult to forgive her, Jamie tells her that he wants her and Connor back home, and that they will have to see if it can work out. At the beginning of her voiceover for episode four, he lets her out of the cab, and she walks through the Chatsworth estate, with jeers of "slag" and "slapper" being yelled by others, and egg thrown at her. She meets back up with Jamie at the Jockey, where he gives everyone 30 seconds for people to say whatever they like to her, before they accept that she's his wife and he won't allow it to continue. He then headbutts one man who passed the allotted time before walking out of the room, leaving Karen standing alone. Still feeling like an outcast and wanting badly to make her marriage work again, it's only after she runs into Frank at the hospital that she realises she's tired of being judged for her past mistakes.

Jamie used his power of attorney while Karen was ill to put The Jockey solely in his name, and at first he is very cold towards her after her return, ignoring her suggestions and making it clear that the pub was no longer hers, but his and run with Mimi, leaving Karen feeling very left out. She explains to him that she knows she has to earn his trust back, and just wants him to give her a chance. After Jamie is overwhelmed by the chaos of trying to organise Libby Croker's (Pauline McLynn) wedding party, he asks Karen to help them, finally acknowledging that he does need her, and does appreciate her. Later, he takes her back into their bed and things begin to return to normal for the couple.

Karen briefly tries to run a clown business before several male customers attempt to assault her, during which she shoots one in the thigh with one of the Maguire's stolen guns. In a later episode, we see her standing in front of The Jockey, scowling up at the "Jamie Maguire, proprietor" sign. After winning a card game from Jamie, she demands that he return the pub to her. The couple is then later seen standing in front of the pub looking at two signs, one of which says "under new management," and the other saying "Jamie and Karen Maguire, proprietors."

In series 9 Karen has returned to her former, stable self. She invites half the estate to stay with her when they're evicted, and also gets into a fight with Gloria Meak (Angeline Ball), which is quickly settled. Karen is unaware for some time that Jamie has begun an affair with Gloria, a fact that is hidden from her even when Jamie is trapped with others underground, although Gloria's brother Dominic (Stephen Lord) does find out at this time. Karen later realises Jamie is possibly having an affair, and asks for the help of Gloria and others to find out who it is, worried that perhaps it is her condition causing paranoia. At the end of the episode, she sees Jamie and Gloria together, and realises who he was having an affair with all along.

Several episodes later Karen and Connor's lives appear to be in danger, with Jamie receiving threatening phone calls and pictures of his family. Karen is attacked in the park while walking Connor. He attempts to go after enemies while trying to protect his wife and child, and later agrees to a ransom of 200,000 after Karen is kidnapped. After several car changes, he finds Karen as she walks out into the warehouse, revealing to him that she planned the whole thing, and that she knows about his affair. She explains that now she knows he does love her and she loves him, but that the secrets are going to stop. She's keeping the 200,000, and will now control the finances of his business, keeping Jamie in check. At the end of the episode, she tells him that if something happens to her, there is an unknown friend who knows everything about Jamie.

=== Billy Tutton ===
- Played by: Michael Taylor (Series 7, 8–11)

Billy Tutton
- Shameless character
- Portrayed by: Michael Taylor
- Duration: 2010, 2011–2013
- First appearance: 16 February 2010; Series 7 Episode 4 "Toyboy"
- Last appearance: 28 May 2013; Series 11 Episode 14 "End of the Line"
- Created by: Paul Abbott
- Introduced by: George Faber
In-universe information
- Mother: Maureen Tutton
- Wife: Mimi Maguire (2011–)
- Daughters: Cilla Tutton
- Stepsons: Jamie Maguire (2011–); Shane Maguire (2011–); Micky Maguire (2011–); Donny Maguire (2011–); Joey Maguire (2011–)
- Uncles: Terry
- Aunts: Sheila; Harriet

Billy Tutton, first appeared in Episode 4 of Series 7, when he was on The Jockey football team, lying about his age he started a sexual relationship with Mimi Maguire (Tina Malone) who then went on to have his baby Cilla. He returned in series 8, when he snatched Cilla without Mimi noticing. He and Mimi married on the last episode of Series 8. Billy appeared in 40 episodes overall.

Billy is often portrayed as unreliable and childish; therefore mocked by most of the Chatsworth community. Numerous times he has tried to prove himself worthy to the Maguire sons and the local community by demonstrating that he can be mature and ruthless, but to no avail.

(Michael Taylor previously co-starred alongside fellow Shameless Alumni Kelli Hollis and Qasim Akhtar in the 2005 film Mischief Night. He also played as a different character called "Spider" in Series 4, Episode 5 of Shameless).

=== Ruby Hepburn ===
- Played by: Kari Corbett (Series 9–10)

Ruby Hepburn
- Shameless character
- Portrayed by: Kari Corbett
- Duration: 2012
- First appearance: 24 January 2012; Series 9 Episode 4 "Vendetta"
- Last appearance: 1 November 2012; Series 10 Episode 10 "One Year On"
- Created by: Paul Abbott
- Introduced by: George Faber
In-universe information
- Father: Kenny Hepburn
- Aunts: Mimi Maguire; Bobbi Hepburn
- First cousins: Jamie Maguire; Shane Maguire; Micky Maguire; Mandy Maguire; Donny Maguire; Joey Maguire; Fergal Maguire; Cilla Tutton
- Other relatives: Katie Maguire

Ruby Hepburn is the niece of Mimi Tutton (Tina Malone). She appeared in 18 episodes in total. She arrives from Glasgow to live with her aunt and cousins, Shane (Nicky Evans) and Micky Maguire (Ciarán Griffiths), in Chatsworth and her looks immediately attract the attentions of many residents, including Shane. She quickly gets involved with the family's criminal activities which leads her to be trapped underground with Shane, Jamie (Aaron McCusker), Aidan Croker (Robbie Conway) and Frank Gallagher (David Threlfall). Later, Mimi starts to make hurtful comments about Ruby's father, which angers her so much she holds Mimi hostage in the bedroom. Ruby reveals that she has always hated Mimi for her treatment of her father and threatens to kill her. Mimi doesn't take the threat seriously so Ruby stabs her in the leg. Meanwhile, Shane, Billy Tutton (Michael Taylor) and Jamie try to enter the room, but Ruby has placed furniture in front of the door. As the men push through the door the furniture topples over and knocks Ruby out of the window, where she falls onto the patio and is instantly killed. Later, Shane and Jamie bury Ruby in a shallow grave in the woods.

== The Ball/Fisher family ==
=== Kev Ball ===
- Played by: Dean Lennox Kelly (Series 1–4, 8, 11)

Kev Ball
- Shameless character
- Portrayed by: Dean Lennox Kelly
- Duration: 2004–2007, 2011, 2013
- First appearance: 13 January 2004; Series 1 Episode 1 "Meet the Gallaghers"
- Last appearance: 28 May 2013; Series 11 Episode 14 "End of the Line"
- Created by: Paul Abbott
- Introduced by: George Faber
In-universe information
- Occupation: Barman; Construction site worker
- Father: Homer Ball
- Mother: Lynette Ball
- Sisters: Kelly Maguire
- Half-sisters: Tonya Ball
- Wife: Roxy Benson (1994–2006); Veronica Fisher (2008–)
- Uncles: Pete Ball
- Aunts: Pat Ball; Anna Ball
- Nephews: Enrico

Kevin Alan "Kev" Ball (born 24 January 1974) worked in the local public house, The Jockey, and was the next-door neighbour of the Gallagher family. He is also the brother of Kelly Maguire (Sally Carman). He appeared in 29 episodes in total.

Kev's marriage to Veronica Fisher (Maxine Peake) is legally invalid because he never got a divorce from his first wife, Roxy (Jill Halfpenny), who Kev left because of domestic violence. He told Veronica the situation prior to their wedding. However, having discovered that Veronica's late father had left £5,000 to pay for his daughter's wedding, Veronica and Kev decided to go through with a sham wedding in order to get the wedding money. Their plan was to use the money to buy their council house. Following the sham ceremony, the reception venue was set alight by Veronica's pyromaniac brother Marty (Jack Deam). Kev and Veronica had to use the £5,000 to compensate the owners of the venue for the fire damage caused by Marty.

Kev is illiterate. And despite having lessons on and off over the years, he has had limited success, until Veronica agreed to help him out once she learned that the instructor of his adult literacy class was sexually harassing him.

Kev also took boxing lessons from his late father during childhood; a skill he attempts to pass onto his foster child, Eric, in the second series. He is also referred to several times in the same episode as "Kelvin Ball".

Kev and Veronica appeared briefly in the first episode of the fourth series. They were shown being brought into a Romanian courthouse. They had been arrested after attempting to buy an orphan.

He returned in Series 8 for the 100th episode as a guest character. He and Veronica are still together and seem to have been released by the Romanian authorities at some unspecified date. Both Kev and Veronica now reside in Nottingham, where Kev works in construction. Returning to Chatsworth temporarily, he helps Kelly, Carl Gallagher (Elliott Tittensor) and the Maguires to prove Frank Gallagher's (David Threlfall) innocence in a violent attack on an elderly lady. After this, he returns to Nottingham, Kev returns in the final episode of Shameless helping Fiona take care of Stella and the newborn baby, while she gets Steve to agree take them off Frank & Monica’s hands, he loses them and tells Frank about it which Frank happily kisses him.

=== Veronica Ball ===
- Played by: Maxine Peake (Series 1–4)

Veronica Ball
- Shameless character
- Portrayed by: Maxine Peake
- Duration: 2004–2007
- First appearance: 13 January 2004; Series 1 Episode 1 "Meet the Gallaghers"
- Last appearance: 9 January 2007; Series 4 Episode 1 "New Beginnings"
- Created by: Paul Abbott
- Introduced by: George Faber
In-universe information
- Father: Malcolm Fisher
- Mother: Carol Fisher
- Brothers: Marty Fisher; Mitch Fisher; Phil Fisher; Leo Fisher; Barry Fisher
- Husband: Kev Ball (2008–)

Veronica Carol "Vee" Ball (née Fisher; born 19 June 1974) is Carol Fisher's (Marjorie Yates) daughter and Marty Fisher's (Jack Deam) older sister. She has four other brothers called Mitch, Phil, Leo and Barry. She is also Fiona Gallagher's (Anne-Marie Duff) best friend. Veronica lived next door to the Gallaghers with her husband Kev Ball (Dean Lennox Kelly), although their marriage is not legal due to Kev still being married to his first wife, Roxy (Jill Halfpenny). Veronica appeared in 27 episodes overall.

She stated that she and Kev thought they were rough, until the Gallaghers moved in next door, which made the two feel like Charles and Camilla. Veronica was on very friendly terms with Fiona's younger sister, Debbie Gallagher (Rebecca Ryan), and often defended her in certain situations.

Veronica has a rather bitter relationship with most of her family, especially her mother Carol, who often behaves with a dismissive and ungrateful attitude toward her daughter.

Days before Frank Gallagher (David Threlfall) and Sheila Jackson's (Maggie O'Neill) wedding in the third series, Veronica learned that Sheila's first husband, Sheldon, was buried in the back garden with his gold jewellery. After learning that her and Kev's IVF had failed, she conspired with Frank to dig up the body to recover the valuables, only to discover that Sheldon had been stabbed. After the gold medallions were taken, Veronica was sorely disappointed to find out they were cheap fakes. Veronica discovers from Sheila that Sheldon used to beat and torment her by burning her with his medallions, until she snapped and stabbed him. Veronica and Kev then convinced Frank not to allow Sheila to turn herself in to the police.

Later in the show on the start of a season Kev and Veronica were seen on TV when apprehended by Romanian authorities for attempting to buy a child from an orphanage. This came sudden and was unknown where they were until the TV report. They were jailed for up to 6 years.

Veronica and Kev both now live in Nottingham having been released from a Romanian prison by the authorities. While Veronica is never seen in person on the show again, Kev returned to the show for an episode on 27 September 2011.

=== Kelly Ball ===
- Played by: Sally Carman (Series 2, 3, 4, 5–11)

Kelly Maguire
- Shameless character
- Portrayed by: Sally Carman
- Duration: 2005–2013
- First appearance: 1 March 2005; Series 2 Episode 7 "Sister, Sister"
- Last appearance: 19 March 2013; Series 11 Episode 4 "No-One's Perfect"
- Created by: Paul Abbott
- Introduced by: George Faber
In-universe information
- Occupation: Prostitute
- Father: Homer Ball
- Mother: Lynette Ball
- Brothers: Kev Ball
- Half-sisters: Tonya Ball
- Husband: Shane Maguire (2010–13)
- Aunts: Pat Ball; Anna Ball
- Nephews: Enrico

Kelly Ball (also Maguire) is Kev Ball's (Dean Lennox Kelly) sister. A recovered heroin addict, she became a prostitute and inspired Lillian Tyler (Alice Barry) to open up a brothel, and struck up a relationship with Shane Maguire (Nicky Evans), which ended under intimidation from his father Paddy (Sean Gilder). She returned a couple of episodes later, telling Shane she "decided not to take his father's offer". This resulted in Shane confronting Paddy, who beat him up in The Jockey. At the end of series 5 Kelly announces she is pregnant with Shane's child, and is welcomed into the family with open arms by Paddy and Mimi (Tina Malone). In series 6 it is revealed by Kelly that she had had a phantom pregnancy, and was comforted by Mimi and Shane. Kelly appeared in 85 episodes overall.

During her early appearances on the show, Kelly had a hostile relationship with her sister-in-law Veronica Fisher (Maxine Peake), who was the one that eventually discovered her addiction to heroin, and helped Kelly get clean by locking her in the bathroom against her will, she would later return to Chatsworth looking for a room to rent and Frank Gallagher (David Threlfall) used it as opportunity to collect cash from her, and allows her to live with him and Sheila Jackson (Maggie O'Neill) but little do they know that's she's a prostitute and kick her out because of it.

In Series 4 she returns once again, at first trying to move in with Kev & V, only to discover the Maguires have moved in, and believing Mimi to be Kev’s new girlfriend nearly gets attacked only to be stopped by Carrie Rogers (Amanda Ryan), who eases the tension but physically assaults Kelly herself, later she tries to convince Frank once again to let her move in with him much to his disapproval, next she tries to convince Lip Gallagher (Jody Latham) to move into the middle apartment in which Mandy Maguire (Samantha Siddall) immediately blows off, next tries to convince Jamie Maguire (Aaron McCusker) to move in with him, in which his wife Karen Maguire (Rebecca Atkinson) refuses (do to using her old room as a whore house) so she moves in with Lillian and in season 5 suggests she opens up a brothel in which turns out to be successful, she becomes involved with Shane, until Paddy pays her off and she coldly breaks up with Shane, she returns near the end and tells Shane everything in which leads to a violent confrontation with his father, touched that he stood up for her admits her feelings to him, she later finds out about a pregnancy scare and while she's doing that finds Katie (Mandy's daughter) and brings her back thus earning the respect of the entire Maguire family.

In series 7, Kelly is chosen initially by Jamie and Karen to be the godmother of their newborn son, Connor Joseph Maguire. She and Shane have also actively dealt in personal side jobs in addition to the normal Maguire family business.

In the fourth episode of Series 7, Kelly has sex with Paddy in exchange for money, after Paddy found it hard to "pull" on a night out with his sons. Paddy wanted to hurt Shane since he felt Shane had not been there for him. Paddy and Kelly kept their encounter a secret, but during a mass wedding scam, Shane proposed to Kelly. Kelly turned him down several times, even ending their relationship, because she could not marry him while living a lie. Shane told her he would forgive her sleeping with anyone, at which point she and a guilty Paddy made eye contact. Shane was devastated to learn the truth, but forgave Kelly, and they married in a civil ceremony at the Jockey.

Shane was deeply upset when he learned he was sterile. Jamie, Paddy and Micky Maguire (Ciarán Griffiths) offered to be Kelly's sperm donors, but she refused, saying she'd already had Paddy in her once and wasn't going to do that ever again. As they would be unable to adopt a child, Liam Gallagher (Johnny Bennett) convinced them to try to be parents to Shane's niece Katie. This plan was dashed when Katie's father Lip decided to take a more active role in her life. Kelly and Shane decided to give up on their plans and just be honorary parental figures for Liam, whom she has grown quite fond of.

Kelly was revealed in the thirteenth episode of series 7 to have a fifteen-year-old half-sister named Tonya, whose care she was briefly responsible for. Kelly and Tonya were both fathered by a man named Homer. It was implied that he abused them both sexually. Tonya had a baby boy named Enrico, who was in foster-care. Micky, who pretended to be Shane during a visit from a social worker during his brother's absence, found out from Tonya that Enrico was actually born out of incest with her father, who raped her. She begged him not to tell Kelly. After finding out that Homer abused them both, Micky injected tranquilizer into Homer's bloodstream in The Jockey toilets, and dragged him with Shane's help to a slaughterhouse to dispose of him, doing his sister-in-law a tremendous favour in the process.

In Series 8 Kelly falls out of love with Shane and begins seeing Marty Fisher (Jack Deam), who later she becomes with pregnant with. Kelly and Shane break up and her and Marty start their lives together. In Series 9 Kelly loses the baby in an accident, leading to a breakdown of constant drinking and drug abuse. She eventually leaves, disowning her friends, but returns when she realises Marty truly loves her.

=== Carol Fisher ===
- Played by: Marjorie Yates (Series 1, 2–4)

Carol Fisher
- Shameless character
- Portrayed by: Marjorie Yates
- Duration: 2004–2007
- First appearance: 27 January 2004; Series 1 Episode 3 "We're Getting Married"
- Last appearance: 27 February 2007; Series 4 Episode 8 "Revelations"
- Created by: Paul Abbott
- Introduced by: George Faber
In-universe information
- Occupation: Barmaid
- Husband: Malcolm
- Sons: Marty Fisher; Mitch Fisher; Phil Fisher; Leo Fisher; Barry Fisher
- Daughters: Veronica Ball

Carol Fisher (1945–2011) is the mother of Veronica Ball (Maxine Peake) and Marty Fisher (Jack Deam). She was a guest character in the first series of Shameless, later becoming a main character in the second series. She is a pathological kleptomaniac and a bossy and demanding woman, fond of having affairs with much younger men. Carol is also best friends with nosy neighbour Lillian Tyler (Alice Barry). In series 3, she found out that Lillian had an affair with her husband Malcolm in the 1970s, resulting in a catfight in The Jockey. Overall, Carol appeared in 28 episodes.

Carol is very promiscuous for her age. In series 3, she embarked on a relationship with a man named Norman. She later found out that he was a nudist. Their relationship ended when he urinated on her during sex. Carol is also quite religious, although she somehow is able to balance it with her promiscuous nature.

Carol moved in with her daughter Veronica and her husband Kev (Dean Lennox Kelly) after Marty burned her house down when he left prison and found her with another man. She then moved in with the Gallaghers after Veronica kicked her and Marty out in order to foster a child. Carol then moved in to The Jockey. Absent from series 5, Karen Maguire (Rebecca Atkinson) revealed in the first episode of the series that Carol had "fucked off to Magaluf with 2 months takings," from The Jockey, before flashing to a picture on the wall of Carol which read 'Employee of the month.' It is revealed in Series 8 by her son Marty that Carol has died.

=== Marty Fisher ===
- Played by: Jack Deam (Series 1, 2–4, 8–11)

Marty Fisher
- Shameless character
- Portrayed by: Jack Deam
- Duration: 2004–2007, 2011–2013
- First appearance: 13 January 2004; Series 1 Episode 3 "We're Getting Married"
- Last appearance: 19 March 2013; Series 11 Episode 4 "No-One's Perfect"
- Created by: Paul Abbott
- Introduced by: George Faber
In-universe information
- Father: Malcolm Fisher
- Mother: Carol Fisher
- Brothers: Mitch Fisher; Phil Fisher; Leo Fisher; Barry Fisher
- Sisters: Veronica Ball
- Wife: Sue Garland (2008–2011)

Martin Andrew "Marty" Fisher (born 1978) is the son of Carol Fisher (Marjorie Yates), and brother of Veronica Ball (Maxine Peake). Marty has coprolalic Tourette's syndrome and is a pyromaniac. He was a guest character in the first series of Shameless, became a main character in the second series, and left along with Veronica and Kev Ball (Dean Lennox Kelly) in the first episode of the fourth series. Marty was originally something of a burden to the other characters, setting things alight when he got angry, particularly whenever he found Carol with much younger men. At one point he burns Carol's house down when he finds her having sex in the shower with his best friend, as well as burning down the toilets of The Jockey when Veronica attempts to have him sent back to prison after he escaped to attend her wedding; incidents like this have landed him in prison several times. His Tourette's syndrome often creates uncomfortable situations for him, causing him to reveal otherwise secret information or offend those who are not used to him by insulting/swearing. However, later in the series Debbie Gallagher (Rebecca Ryan) teaches Marty to use other words such as buttermilk and spongecake instead of swearing, and his pyromania seems to calm down when he starts a relationship with Sue Garland (Gillian Kearney). The two live relatively happily in the Gallagher household for a time, until Marty accompanies Kev and Veronica in a scheme to buy a Romanian baby from an orphanage. Marty escapes back to the Chatsworth with the stolen orphan and suggests to Sue that they raise it as their own. Initially Sue is reluctant but later saves the baby from being sent back by the police. Sue reveals that she is pregnant with Marty's child and the two leave the estate.

He returns in Series 8, Episode 17. Marty reveals that he and Sue lived happily for years in Spain with their kids, only for Sue to cheat on him with a rich local and kick him out of the house. Not knowing where else to go, Marty flees back to the Chatsworth and begins squatting in a flat once occupied by heroin addicts, and on the run from the CSA for not paying child maintenance. Presumably, he found his mother Carol (who left to go to Maguluf), as he returns with her urn. Shortly after returning Marty causes tension between Shane (Nicky Evans) and Kelly Maguire (Sally Carman) by telling Kelly that he loves her.

In series 9, he and Kelly hit a rough patch when she loses the baby, she leaves him, but returns on discovering he truly loves her. He also attempts to tamper with the estates electricity, resulting in a total blackout.

In the tenth series, after discovering that his children are still alive, Marty left Chatsworth to find them.

He returned for the eleventh series shortly before leaving with Kelly for good. Marty appeared in 44 episodes overall.

=== Sue Garland ===
- Played by: Gillian Kearney (Series 2–4)

Sue Garland
- Shameless character
- Portrayed by: Gillian Kearney
- Duration: 2005–2007
- First appearance: 22 February 2005; Series 2 Episode 8 "Against The Odds"
- Last appearance: 9 January 2007; Series 4 Episode 1 "New Beginnings"
- Created by: Paul Abbott
- Introduced by: George Faber
In-universe information
- Husband: Craig Garland (1997–2005); Marty Fisher (2008–2011)

Sue Garland was the wife of Marty Fisher (Jack Deam).

== The Croker family ==
=== Libby Croker ===
- Played by: Pauline McLynn (Series 7–8)

Libby Croker
- Shameless character
- Portrayed by: Pauline McLynn
- Duration: 2010–2011
- First appearance: 26 January 2010; Series 7 Episode 1 "Perfectly Frank"
- Last appearance: 8 March 2011; Series 8 Episode 13 "Beginnings and Ends"
- Created by: Paul Abbott
- Introduced by: George Faber
In-universe information
- Occupation: Librarian (2010–11); Postwoman (2011)
- Mother: Patty Croker
- First cousins: Sinead Croker
- Other relatives: Aidan Croker

Elizabeth "Libby" Croker (born 1967) is Frank Gallagher's (David Threlfall) third major love interest. She is a librarian who lives with her disabled mother, Patty Croker (Valerie Lilley), for whom she is sole carer, giving up her own independent existence. Libby is narcoleptic. In the most recent episode, she has moved in with Frank, after being released from prison for inciting a riot. Her mother has also moved in with the Gallaghers, living in their front room, and has been set up as a counterpoint to Frank, both of whom consider the other as "fakers" regarding their illnesses. Libby's moving into the Gallagher home has not been welcomed by Frank's sons. Liam Gallagher (Johnny Bennett) in particular has demonstrated a rather cold attitude toward Libby, perhaps because he fears that the relationship is doomed to failure anyway, and doesn't want to get too friendly with Libby. However, Libby has gradually been accepted by most of the family. In episode 13 of Series 8 Libby was found to be exchanging love letters with a colleague. The colleague was later found out to be a figment of her imagination borne out of a desperate need for affection.

After she and Frank split, Libby left Chatsworth whilst her mother and godson Aidan (Robbie Conway) chose to stay with the Gallaghers. She appeared in 24 episodes overall.

=== Patty Croker ===
- Played by: Valerie Lilley (Series 7–10)

Patty Croker
- Shameless character
- Portrayed by: Valerie Lilley
- Duration: 2010–2012
- First appearance: 26 January 2010; Series 7 Episode 1 "Perfectly Frank"
- Last appearance: 1 November 2012; Series 10 Episode 10 "One Year On"
- Created by: Paul Abbott
- Introduced by: George Faber
In-universe information
- Occupation: Retired
- Husband: Trevor (widowed)
- Daughters: Libby Croker
- Nieces: Sinead Croker
- Other relatives: Aidan Croker

Patricia Finola "Patty" Croker (1942–2012) is the elderly mother to Libby Croker (Pauline McLynn), and Frank Gallagher's (David Threlfall) main adversary in series 7. Patty, who is a wheelchair user, is fiercely protective of her narcoleptic daughter, and in series 8, she is not fond of her new neighbours, the Powells. Patty has been shown to not like people in general, constantly shouting at her daughter and telling her she is much better off without Frank, and even tries to report her new neighbours, Jackson (Emmanuel Ighodaro) and Avril Powell (Karen Bryson), into the police for having sex too loud, but gets her comeuppance when they spike her wine with drugs.

In series 10, Patty is diagnosed with terminal cancer but wishes to see Ireland once more, reluctantly Frank is given the job to take her, once having seen Ireland one last time Patty commits suicide whilst Frank gets drunk in a local pub. Patty appeared in 49 episodes in total.

=== Aidan Croker ===
- Played by: Robbie Conway (Series 8–11)

Aidan Croker
- Shameless character
- Portrayed by: Robbie Conway
- Duration: 2011–2013
- First appearance: 12 January 2011; Series 8 Episode 4 "Back Home (Part 4 of 5)"
- Last appearance: 28 May 2013; Series 11 Episode 14 "End of the Line"
- Created by: Paul Abbott
- Introduced by: George Faber
In-universe information
- Occupation: Student
- Mother: Sinead Croker
- Other relatives: Patty Croker; Libby Croker

Aidan Croker (born 8 December 1995) arrives to the Chatsworth estate in the eighth series, and fills the void left by Liam Gallagher (Johnny Bennett). He is introduced to the series when he has been sent to live with his aunt, Patty Croker (Valerie Lilley) and godmother Libby Croker (Pauline McLynn). During his first episode, he was already shown to be a trouble-maker; beating up neighbour Jackson Powell (Emmanuel Ighodaro), and buying internet porn with Libby's credit card.

It is revealed that Aidan's father was a "Gypsy" who abandoned the family when Aidan was only a baby. Therefore, Aidan spent his childhood with his mother, Sinead, who eventually had a breakdown before turning to drugs and prostitution, after she gets out of prison she blames all her shortcomings on Aidan, and after seeing how pathetic she really is, Patty allows Aidan to continue living in the Gallagher home.

He soon strikes up a close friendship with Letitia Powell (Kira Martin) which is shown throughout the series. Aidan is also seen involved in schemes with the Maguire family and Marty Fisher (Jack Deam) in Series 9, as well as being a big brother figure to Frank's youngest daughter Stella Gallagher (Nikita Brownlee), showing to really care about her such as when she was locked in with a man with a gun he shows regret by not walking her home from school. Overall, Aidan appeared in 47 episodes.

== The Karib family ==
=== Kash Karib ===
- Played by: Chris Bisson (Series 1–4, 6)

Kash Karib
- Shameless character
- Portrayed by: Chris Bisson
- Duration: 2004–2007, 2009
- First appearance: 13 January 2004; Series 1 Episode 1 "Meet the Gallaghers"
- Last appearance: 21 April 2009; Series 6 Episode 14 "Haunted by the Past"
- Created by: Paul Abbott
- Introduced by: George Faber
In-universe information
- Occupation: Shopkeeper
- Mother: Umi Karib
- Sisters: Shazza Karib
- Wife: Yvonne Karib (1989–2009)
- Sons: Chesney Karib
- Daughters: Meena Karib
- Aunts: Usma Karib
- Nieces: Sita Desai

Kash Karib (1966–2009) was the husband of Yvonne Karib (Kelli Hollis), with whom he has two children, Chesney (Qasim Akhtar) and Meena (Sarah Byrne). Early in the series, it is revealed that Kash is homosexual. This is disclosed when he has an affair with his under age employee Ian Gallagher (Gerard Kearns). He also states at one point that he cannot stand the feel of a woman's touch. Yvonne eventually discovers the relationship between her husband and Ian.

Kash became a city councillor in Series 3. After falling into financial difficulties, he fakes his own suicide and leaves town during Series 4. Yvonne has knowledge of the pretend suicide. Kash's actions leave Yvonne homeless and in huge debt. Kash returns in series 6, but nobody is pleased to see him. Much to Yvonne's frustration and dismay, Kash demands that Yvonne give him money. Yvonne problems are soon resolved when she and Stan Waterman (Warren Donnelly) plot to kill Kash. Chesney knocks his father unconscious with a baseball bat and leaves him to die when a fire erupts at the shop. Kash appeared in 19 episodes overall.

=== Yvonne Karib ===
- Played by: Kelli Hollis (Series 1–7, 11)

Yvonne Karib
- Shameless character
- Portrayed by: Kelli Hollis
- Duration: 2004–2010, 2013
- First appearance: 13 January 2004; Series 1 Episode 1 "Meet the Gallaghers"
- Last appearance: 28 May 2013; Series 11 Episode 14 "End of the Line"
- Created by: Paul Abbott
- Introduced by: George Faber
In-universe information
- Occupation: Businesswoman (2004–2010)
- Husband: Kash Karib (1989–2009)
- Sons: Chesney Karib
- Daughters: Meena Karib

Yvonne Toni-Marie Karib (born 1 April 1965) was married to Kash Karib (Chris Bisson), with whom she has two children, Chesney (Qasim Akhtar) and Meena (Sarah Byrne). She owns and runs the local shop featured in the series, and previously employed Ian Gallagher (Gerard Kearns), her husband's gay lover. At first she was angry to discover Kash was gay, but later accepted it to keep her marriage together for her children's sake. She is a hard-nosed businesswoman who is not averse to breaking the law to make a bit of extra profit.

Yvonne converted to Islam to marry Kash, and is far more devout than her now estranged husband. Although white, she always wears Asian dress and was originally never seen without a hijab, although she no longer wears one.

It is revealed Yvonne was raised in a white supremacist family, and refused to move back home to them after being made homeless in the last episode of series 4, in fear of her own life and her children's, as well. During this episode, Yvonne moved into the house between the Gallaghers and the Maguires after arranging to rent it from Fiona Gallagher (Anne-Marie Duff) and Steve McBride (James McAvoy). Series 5 sees her begin a relationship with police officer Stan Waterman (Warren Donnelly).

In Series 7, Yvonne has borrowed money off Paddy Maguire (Sean Gilder) due to massive debt and that the "banks wouldn't touch her". After Stan is assaulted, she accepts Joe Pritchard's (Ben Batt) offer to buy her out. She and Stan have now left Windsor Gardens.

In Series 11, Yvonne returns to Chatsworth to run the shop, which is now owned by Chesney, whilst his girlfriend, Mary-Mae St. Rose (Adelle Leonce), is expecting a baby. In total, Yvonne appeared in 51 episodes.

=== Chesney Karib ===
- Played by: Qasim Akhtar (Series 4–11)

Chesney Karib
- Shameless character
- Portrayed by: Qasim Akhtar
- Duration: 2007–2013
- First appearance: 27 February 2007; Series 4 Episode 8 "Revelations"
- Last appearance: 28 May 2013; Series 11 Episode 14 "End of the Line"
- Created by: Paul Abbott
- Introduced by: George Faber
In-universe information
- Occupation: Businessman
- Father: Kash Karib
- Mother: Yvonne Karib
- Sisters: Meena Karib
- Grandmothers: Umi Karib
- Aunts: Shazza Karib
- First cousins: Sita Desai
- Other relatives: Usma Karib

Chesney Karib (born 1992), played by (Qasim Akhtar), is Yvonne (Kelli Hollis) and Kash Karib's (Chris Bisson) son and younger child. He was briefly the Young Mayor of Chatsworth and love interest of Debbie Gallagher (Rebecca Ryan), until he admits to using her and not having the slightest interest in her or her intentions in trying to make the town a better place. However, Chesney was using the campaign funds to help an elderly Pakistani woman to take her British Citizenship Test, thus earning Debbie's respect (despite thinking his reasoning for doing so was silly but still admires that he helped someone and didn't ask for anything in return). Chesney is a smart but moody teenager who quietly resents his mother's bossy and abrupt demeanour.

In Series 6, Chesney finds out that his mother had faked his father's death. Kash then attends the shop in order to speak with his son. In a moment of rage, Chesney knocks his father out cold, and seemed to be prepared to bludgeon him with a baseball bat when the fireworks that were stacked up in the shop's stockroom were ignited, due to the spreading flames of Chesney's insufficiently stamped out cigarette. Chesney flees the store, leaving his unconscious father to die for real from smoke inhalation. Having discovered his parents duplicity, Chesney began to openly defy Yvonne by liberally taking money from the till and drinking in the house.

In Series 7, Chesney helps his mother and Stan Waterman (Warren Donnelly) cheat Paddy Maguire (Sean Gilder) out of the money they owed him. He continues to work at the Kash and Carry after Joe Pritchard purchases the shop from Yvonne. Things begin to go badly for Chesney a party thrown at his house takes an abrupt turn when a drunk girl is taken advantage of, and the boy that transpired the events gets battered to death by the girl's older brother. The act was filmed and spread via photographs over a mobile phone. Chesney and Carl Gallagher (Elliott Tittensor) were witnesses to the assault. Their consciences soon got the better of them, which led them to grafittying the name of the killer close to the scene of the crime.

The murderer, Jimmy, in turn prevented them from going forward to the police by threatening to kill Liam Gallagher (Johnny Bennett), and tells them to leave Chatsworth. After spending some time at a Welsh farm with a woman called Hazel, who has her own murky past which Chesney helped her resolve, both he and Carl decided to return to Chatsworth to clear their names. When entering a football competition for gays, Chesney argues with Ian over his homosexual relationship with Kash long ago. Towards the end of the penultimate episode, Chesney has a dream including fellows homosexuals Micky Maguire (Ciarán Griffiths) and Ian Gallagher (Gerard Kearns), and it is assumed that he may actually have homosexual feelings himself. These feelings progress in the eighth series when along with Micky, he starts up a gay sex line and begins to enjoy it far too much. Chesney appeared in 85 episodes overall.

=== Meena Karib ===
- Played by: Sarah Byrne (Series 4–6)

Meena Karib
- Shameless character
- Portrayed by: Sarah Patel (Series 4); Sarah Byrne (Series 5–6)
- Duration: 2007–2009
- First appearance: 27 February 2007; Series 4 Episode 8 "Revelations"
- Last appearance: 12 May 2009; Series 6 Episode 16 "It's Over"
- Created by: Paul Abbott
- Introduced by: George Faber
In-universe information
- Occupation: Model; Shop assistant
- Father: Kash Karib
- Mother: Yvonne Karib
- Brothers: Chesney Karib
- Grandmothers: Umi Karib
- Aunts: Shazza Karib
- First cousins: Sita Desai
- Other relatives: Usma Karib

Meena Karib is the rebellious daughter of Kash (Chris Bisson) and Yvonne Karib (Kelli Hollis). She and her brother Chesney are mentioned but unseen throughout the first four series. In the finale of series 4, she makes her first appearance, opposing of her mother's plan to move the Karib family to Windsor Gardens. She also sleeps with Carl Gallagher (Elliott Tittensor) and tricks him into thinking she is pregnant so that she can extort money out of him. By series 5, Carl has lost interest in Meena. Throughout series 5, Meena and Chesney threaten their mother's relationship with Stan Waterman (Warren Donnelly) because they don't like him. In series 5 episode 12, Meena arranges for her mother's shop to be robbed so that she can begin a modelling career with the stolen money. But it doesn't go to plan and she becomes a hostage. In series 6, she clashes with her mother about her modelling career and becomes personal assistant to Lillian Tyler (Alice Barry) at her brothel, eventually moving in after an argument with Yvonne. She also cares for Shane Maguire (Nicky Evans) briefly after his stroke and helps him to return movement to his legs by performing sexual acts on him. She is last seen fighting in The Jockey at Mandy Maguire's (Samantha Siddall) funeral, along with the rest of the estate. She doesn't appear in the seventh series, with no mention of her whereabouts. It is possible that she went to live with Yvonne and Stan when they eloped to Pakistan. She has not been seen or mentioned since the end of series 6. In episode 5 of series 7 Chesney gets a birthday card, which is signed by Yvonne, Meena and Stan suggesting that she's in Pakistan. Meena appeared in 18 episodes in total.

=== Umi Karib ===
- Played by: Shireen Shah (Series 1–2), Shobu Kapoor (Series 4)

Umi Karib
- Shameless character
- Portrayed by: Shireen Shah (Series 1–2); Shobu Kapoor (Series 4)
- Duration: 2004–2005, 2007
- First appearance: 10 February 2004; Series 1 Episode 5 "Affairs"
- Last appearance: 27 February 2007; Series 4 Episode 8 "Revelations"
- Created by: Paul Abbott
- Introduced by: George Faber
In-universe information
- Sons: Kash Karib
- Daughters: Usma Karib; Shazza Karib
- Grandsons: Chesney Karib
- Granddaughters: Meena Karib
- Other relatives: Sita Desai

Umi Karib is the mother of Kash (Chris Bisson) and Shazza Karib (Mina Anwar). She is first seen during the first series, sitting upstairs in the shop watching out for shoplifters on the CCTV for her daughter-in-law Yvonne Karib (Kelli Hollis) and Ian Gallagher (Gerard Kearns). She appears in the Christmas special, revealing herself to be a midwife. In the Christmas special, she delivers Frank Gallagher's (David Threlfall) twins, Nigel and Delia. She isn't seen again until the final episode of the fourth series when Yvonne is nearly mugged by Carl Gallagher (Elliott Tittensor). In her last scene, she tells Yvonne that her house has been taken off her due to Kash's debts. Although she is mentioned to be living with Yvonne during the first four series, even after her son leaves, Umi is not seen again after the fourth series, implying that she may have died.

=== Sita Desai ===
- Played by: Aysha Kala (Series 8)

Sita Desai
- Shameless character
- Portrayed by: Aysha Kala
- Duration: 2011
- First appearance: 10 January 2011; Series 8 Episode 1 "The Night Before (Part 1 of 5)"
- Last appearance: 22 February 2011; Series 8 Episode 11 "Takeover"
- Created by: Paul Abbott
- Introduced by: George Faber
In-universe information
- Uncles: Kash Karib
- Aunts: Shazza Karib
- First cousins: Chesney Karib; Meena Karib
- Other relatives: Usma Karib

Sita Desai is the cousin of Chesney Karib (Qasim Akhtar) who comes to Chatsworth to look after the shop and keep Chesney on the straight and narrow. Unlike most of the Karibs, she is a "pure muslim", who doesn't drink or break any of her religion's belief and during her time on the estate, constantly tries to rehabilitate Chesney. She finds love with Carl Gallagher (Elliott Tittensor), and whilst on a job together, they get into trouble with the police and have sex in a shopping centre storeroom. However, Sita soon departs Chatsworth after agreeing to an arranged marriage and turning down Carl's marriage proposal. Sita appeared in 8 episodes.

== The Powell family ==
=== Jackson Powell ===
- Played by: Emmanuel Ighodaro (Series 8–10)

Jackson Powell
- Shameless character
- Portrayed by: Emmanuel Ighodaro
- Duration: 2011–2012
- First appearance: 10 January 2011; Series 8 Episode 1 "The Night Before (Part 1 of 5)"
- Last appearance: 1 November 2012; Series 10 Episode 10 "One Year On"
- Created by: Paul Abbott
- Introduced by: George Faber
In-universe information
- Occupation: Teacher
- Wife: Avril Powell
- Sons: Africa "Dee" Davies
- Daughters: Letitia Powell

Jackson Powell joins Chatsworth with his wife, Avril (Karen Bryson), and daughter Letitia (Kira Martin). Jackson is a trainee teacher (who later becomes a fully qualified teacher) who is seen to be stubborn, defiant and law-abiding, and has a superficial view on the residents of Chatsworth but after he's caught committing fraud and getting kicked out of his home he begins to see how hard the residents really have and his output towards them changes drastically.

At the end of Series 10, Jackson's marriage to Avril falls apart and he leaves Chatsworth after the baliff's repossess the Powell house. He appeared in 40 episodes in total.

=== Avril Powell ===
- Played by: Karen Bryson (Series 8–11)

Avril Powell
- Shameless character
- Portrayed by: Karen Bryson
- Duration: 2011–2013
- First appearance: 10 January 2011; Series 8 Episode 1 "The Night Before (Part 1 of 5)"
- Last appearance: 28 May 2013; Series 11 Episode 14 "End of the Line"
- Created by: Paul Abbott
- Introduced by: George Faber
In-universe information
- Occupation: Receptionist (until 2011)
- Sisters: Patreesha St. Rose
- Husband: Jackson Powell
- Daughters: Letitia Powell
- Stepsons: Africa "Dee" Davies
- Nieces: Mary-Mae St. Rose

Avril Powell is a newcomer to the Chatsworth Estate and appears from Series 8 Episode 1. Avril is show to be sexually ambiguous and tries to have sex with husband Jackson (Emmanuel Ighodaro) regularly, most of the time to keep hidden the fact that she is sending daughter Letitia (Kira Martin) to a private school, a secret that would devastate her husband. She also has a good friendship with Libby Croker (Pauline McLynn) and Mimi Maguire (Tina Malone), regularly hanging out with them and drinking and smoking with them. Avril appeared in 54 episodes in total.

(Karen Bryson previously appeared in Series 5, Episode 1 of Shameless as a different character who is visiting her husband in hospital whilst Frank is also there.)

=== Letitia Powell ===
- Played by: Kira Martin (Series 8–11)

Letitia Powell
- Shameless character
- Portrayed by: Kira Martin
- Duration: 2011–2013
- First appearance: 10 January 2011; Series 8 Episode 1 "The Night Before (Part 1 of 5)"
- Last appearance: 28 May 2013; Series 11 Episode 14 "End of the Line"
- Created by: Paul Abbott
- Introduced by: George Faber
In-universe information
- Occupation: Student
- Father: Jackson Powell
- Mother: Avril Powell
- Half-brothers: Africa "Dee" Davies
- Aunts: Patreesha St. Rose
- First cousins: Mary-Mae St. Rose

Letitia Powell is a newcomer to the Chatsworth Estate and appears from Series 8 Episode 1. She is the daughter of Jackson (Emmanuel Ighodaro) and Avril Powell (Karen Bryson), and is often seen in the company of Aidan Croker (Robbie Conway). Overall, Letitia appeared in 43 episodes.

=== Patreesha ===
- Played by: Jacqueline Boatswain (Series 11)

Patreesha St. Rose
- Shameless character
- Portrayed by: Jacqueline Boatswain
- Duration: 2013
- First appearance: 26 February 2013; Series 11 Episode 1 "The Golden Empire"
- Last appearance: 28 May 2013; Series 11 Episode 14 "End of the Line"
- Created by: Paul Abbott
- Introduced by: George Faber
In-universe information
- Sisters: Avril Powell
- Husband: Bernard St. Rose
- Daughters: Mary-Mae St. Rose
- Nieces: Letitia Powell

Patreesha St. Rose arrives as the older sister of Avril Powell (Karen Bryson), who allows Avril and her daughter Letitia (Kira Martin) to move in with her in the first episode of Series 11 after her own house is repossessed. She has a tendency to irritate the residents of Chatsworth with her snobbish behaviour. It is later revealed that Patreesha owns half of a car washing business with her husband, Bernard, who became estranged when Patreesha discovered that he was in fact gay. Patreesha appeared in 9 episodes in total.

=== Mary Mae ===
- Played by: Adelle Leonce (Series 11)

Mary-Mae St. Rose
- Shameless character
- Portrayed by: Adelle Leonce
- Duration: 2013
- First appearance: 26 February 2013; Series 11 Episode 1 "The Golden Empire"
- Last appearance: 28 May 2013; Series 11 Episode 14 "End of the Line"
- Created by: Paul Abbott
- Introduced by: George Faber
In-universe information
- Father: Bernard St. Rose
- Mother: Patreesha St. Rose
- Aunts: Avril Powell
- First cousins: Letitia Powell

Mary-Mae St. Rose is introduced as the daughter of Patreesha St. Rose (Jacqueline Boatswain), the sister of established character Avril Powell (Karen Bryson). Her cousin, Letitia Powell (Kira Martin) and her friend Aidan Croker (Robbie Conway) scheme to get Mary-Mae together with Chesney Karib (Qasim Akhtar). The plan works, and when Mary-Mae falls pregnant with Chesney's child, Chesney takes paternity leave from his shop, with his mother Yvonne Karib (Kelli Hollis) returning to Chatsworth to run the shop. Overall, Mary-Mae appeared in 13 episodes.

== The Donnelly family ==
=== Maxine Donnelly ===
- Played by: Joanna Higson (Series 6–7)

Maxine Donnelly
- Shameless character
- Portrayed by: Joanna Higson
- Duration: 2009–2010
- First appearance: 27 January 2009; Series 6 Episode 2 "Trouble in Paradise"
- Last appearance: 11 May 2010; Series 7 Episode 16 "Gang Wars"
- Created by: Paul Abbott
- Introduced by: George Faber
In-universe information
- Occupation: Auxiliary nurse
- Father: Cameron Donnelly
- Mother: Michelle Donnelly
- Brothers: Bruce Donnelly
- Aunts: Julie

Maxine Donnelly (born 1989) is a carefree, spirited, and clever young woman who was introduced in the second episode of series 6 when Carl Gallagher (Elliott Tittensor), after having his broken arm treated there, briefly did volunteer work at the local hospital. Maxine has also become a good friend of Debbie Gallagher's (Rebecca Ryan), while simultaneously having a minor fling with Carl. She works as an auxiliary nurse, and frequently accompanies Debbie on nights out and shopping trips, or more accurately, they steal clothes, and often come up with creative tactics of eluding the centre's security staff. Later in the series, she becomes ever more infatuated with Carl. Maxine and Carl become a couple.

In series 7, Maxine, increasingly disillusioned by Carl's immaturity, secretly aborts her and Carl's unborn baby, but she would later tell Carl, which infuriates him enough to make him end their relationship. She moves in with Ian Gallagher (Gerard Kearns) after her breakup with Carl. She later takes Ian to a party at her parents house under the pretence that Ian is her doctor boyfriend. She tells Ian that her family sees her as a "fuck-up." After witnessing the disparaging remarks from Maxine's father about his daughter, Ian defends her. This leads to an unexpected romance between Ian and Maxine, which in turn leads to a fight and a strained relationship between Ian and Carl as well as Maxine and Carl, Maxine and Micky Maguire (Ciarán Griffiths).

A local tough named Jimmy kills a boy who took advantage of his sister, and he frames Carl and Chesney Karib (Qasim Akhtar) for the crime, forcing them to flee Chatsworth. Maxine is one of the few people who is concerned about Carl's disappearance. Ian tries to convince her not to get involved, but she persists, and when she confronts Jimmy, his sister hits her in the back of the head with a pool cue. Ian feels ashamed that he did nothing to help her, and he confronts Jimmy in an attempt to tape a confession. Jimmy savagely beats him. Ian's sense of worthlessness leads him to withdraw from everyone and makes him unable to perform with Maxine. As she continues to help clear Carl's name, Ian bitterly accuses her of caring more about Carl than she does him. Maxine helps convince Jimmy's sister to go to the police, but there is little time for celebration as Ian continues to give her as well as Carl the cold shoulder. Maxine tells him that she's leaving him, but not because of Carl. Carl finds Maxine at hospital and admits to her that she was right to abort their child. When she tries to tell him she's steering clear of the Gallagher brothers because of the damage she's done to their relationship, Carl tries to get her to reconsider, telling her he's her mate, but Ian is her soulmate. Ian arrives and he and Maxine share sheepish grins, resuming their relationship.

Maxine's brother Bruce (Philip Hill-Pearson) shows up in Chatsworth, sporting a black eye and saying their mother has left and that their father, Cameron (Joe Duttine), hit him and threw him out of the house for being gay. Maxine agrees to let him move in, and goes to confront their father. He tells her that he threw Bruce out for spending all his time smoking dope, and he's stunned to learn Bruce is gay. When Cameron visits Maxine soon afterwards he rubs makeup off Bruce's eye to prove he never hit him. Bruce admits he lied but says Maxine did the same, revealing that Ian was never a doctor, as Maxine had told everyone in the family. Maxine throws Bruce out. In an attempt to try to get closer to her father, she cooks him some dinner and cleans up his home. She tells him that she's always felt like he undermined her and that she'd always been told she had no confidence—even today she had lost a job as head cleaner at the hospital because of lack of confidence. When he shows her little sympathy, she leaves.

Maxine's insecurities about Ian's feelings for men bubble up when he begins going to gay clubs with Bruce and playing against gay football leagues. Maxine begins posing nude for an art class, and recognises the professor as a teacher she had a crush on when she was a teenager. He confesses he also had feelings for her. At first, she appears to be uncomfortable with the realisation that this man found her attractive when she was sixteen years old. She eventually invites him to her home and they get drunk and take cocaine. As they are undressing, Maxine backs out. Unfortunately, the professor has a heart attack and she has to call an ambulance. Maxine desperately tries to explain to Ian. The relationship begins to fall apart, accelerated when Ian holds hostage a man who tried to rob and rape Maxine. When Ian attempts to kill this man with the gun he used to threaten Maxine, she tries to stop him from taking matters further. Maxine notices Ian's attraction to his hostage when the hostage states: You would rather fuck me than kill me.' Maxine catches Ian admitting to the man that he finds him attractive, and she tells Ian that she will never be able to get over his being attracted to other men. Ian leaves Chatsworth.

Maxine did not return for Series 8, with no mention given to her whereabouts. Since the end of Series 7, neither her or her brother Bruce have been seen or mentioned since. However, it is presumed that Maxine left Chatsworth to live with her father Cameron after her turbulent relationships with Carl and Ian. Maxine appeared in 31 episodes in total.

=== Bruce Donnelly ===
- Played by: Philip Hill-Pearson (Series 7)

Bruce Donnelly
- Shameless character
- Portrayed by: Philip Hill-Pearson
- Duration: 2010
- First appearance: 23 February 2010; Series 7 Episode 5 "The Things You Do For Love"
- Last appearance: 11 May 2010; Series 7 Episode 16 "Gang Wars"
- Created by: Paul Abbott
- Introduced by: George Faber
In-universe information
- Occupation: Barman (2010)
- Father: Cameron Donnelly
- Mother: Michelle Donnelly
- Sisters: Maxine Donnelly

Bruce Donnelly is Maxine Donnelly's (Joanna Higson) older brother, first introduced in episode 5 of Series 7, and appeared again from episodes 11–16 after accepting a job as a barman at The Jockey by Mimi Maguire (Tina Malone). Bruce is a charming but manipulative young man. He is also openly gay, but has quickly gained the confidence of Mimi, after at first being thrown out after his father, Cameron (Joe Duttine), caught him smoking cannabis, and then only to arrive at Ian's house and lie to his sister that he was thrown out for being gay. After outstaying his welcome at Ian's, Bruce is taken in by Mimi at The Jockey, who he gradually strikes up a close bond with. In the seventh series he manages a gay football team for a gay football tournament consisting of Carl Gallagher (Elliott Tittensor), Ian Gallagher (Gerard Kearns), Chesney Karib (Qasim Akhtar), Micky Maguire (Ciarán Griffiths) and others.

Bruce didn't return in Series 8, along with his sister. It is presumed that they returned to live with their father as there was nothing keeping them in Chatsworth. Overall, he appeared in 7 episodes.

=== Cameron Donnelly ===
- Played by: Joe Duttine (Series 7)

Cameron Donnelly
- Shameless character
- Portrayed by: Joe Duttine
- Duration: 2010
- First appearance: 23 February 2010; Series 7 Episode 5 "The Things You Do For Love"
- Last appearance: 6 April 2010; Series 7 Episode 11 "Fallen Heroes"
- Created by: Paul Abbott
- Introduced by: George Faber
In-universe information
- Wife: Michelle Donnelly
- Sons: Bruce Donnelly
- Daughters: Maxine Donnelly

Cameron Donnelly is Maxine (Joanna Higson) and Bruce Donnelly's (Philip Hill-Pearson) father who appeared in 2 episodes in Series 7.

== The Meak family ==
=== Gloria Meak ===
- Played by: Angeline Ball (Series 9–11)

Gloria Meak
- Shameless character
- Portrayed by: Angeline Ball
- Duration: 2012–2013
- First appearance: 9 January 2012; Series 9 Episode 2 "Save Chatsworth (Part 2 of 2)"
- Last appearance: 5 March 2013; Series 11 Episode 2 "An Inspector Calls"
- Created by: Paul Abbott
- Introduced by: George Faber
In-universe information
- Occupation: Hairdresser
- Mother: Hazel Meak
- Brothers: Dominic Meak

Gloria Meak appears in Series 9 as a resident and local hair dresser for Chatsworth. Although not previously mentioned, she is meant to be a previously unseen resident in Chatsworth. She is the older sister to Dominic Meak (Stephen Lord), but the two did not grow up together as Gloria was given up for adoption within the first few months of her life. After a confrontation with Karen Maguire (Rebecca Atkinson) in Series 9, Gloria begins a secret affair with Karen's husband Jamie Maguire (Aaron McCusker); a secret which is almost revealed when Jamie goes missing during a robbery with Shane Maguire (Nicky Evans), Ruby Hepburn (Kari Corbett), Frank Gallagher (David Threlfall) and Aidan Croker (Robbie Conway). In series 11, Gloria leaves Chatsworth after she realises Dominic is ashamed of their affair. Gloria appeared in 20 episodes in total.

=== Dominic Meak ===
- Played by: Stephen Lord (Series 9–11)

Dominic Meak
- Shameless character
- Portrayed by: Stephen Lord
- Duration: 2012–2013
- First appearance: 7 February 2012; Series 9 Episode 6 "Last Man Standing"
- Last appearance: 2 April 2013; Series 11 Episode 6 "Death and Erasures"
- Created by: Paul Abbott
- Introduced by: George Faber
In-universe information
- Occupation: Priest (on sabbatical)
- Mother: Hazel Meak
- Sisters: Gloria Meak

Dominic "Dom" Meak is a priest on sabbatical leave due to his affair with an underage girl who became pregnant but then miscarried.

He mostly spends his time in The Jockey either drinking, offering advice or flirting with the local women. Later, Dominic and his sister Gloria Meak (Angeline Ball) have a secret incestuous affair. After almost getting caught and their secret threatened. In series 11, Gloria leaves Chatsworth after she realises Dominic is ashamed of their affair. Dominic appeared in 18 episodes overall.

== The Blanco family ==
=== Kassi Blanco ===
- Played by: Jalaal Hartley (Series 11)

Kassi Blanco
- Shameless character
- Portrayed by: Jalaal Hartley
- Duration: 2013
- First appearance: 26 February 2013; Series 11 Episode 1 "The Golden Empire"
- Last appearance: 26 March 2013; Series 11 Episode 5 "Risky Business"
- Created by: Paul Abbott
- Introduced by: George Faber
In-universe information
- Father: Adi Blanco
- Half-brothers: Jamie Maguire
- Wife: Esther Blanco
- Sons: Tam Blanco; Saul Blanco
- Daughters: Thalia Blanco
- Nephews: Connor Maguire

Kassi Blanco is the long-lost half-brother of Jamie Maguire (Aaron McCusker). He is introduced in the first episode of the eleventh series, with his family being introduced three episodes later when they move to Chatsworth. Kassi appeared in 5 episodes in total.

=== Esther Blanco ===
- Played by: Isy Suttie (Series 11)

Esther Blanco
- Shameless character
- Portrayed by: Isy Suttie
- Duration: 2013
- First appearance: 19 March 2013; Series 11 Episode 4 "No-One's Perfect"
- Last appearance: 28 May 2013; Series 11 Episode 14 "End of the Line"
- Created by: Paul Abbott
- Introduced by: George Faber
In-universe information
- Husband: Kassi Blanco
- Sons: Saul Blanco; Tam Blanco
- Daughters: Thalia Blanco

Esther Blanco is the wife of Kassi Blanco (Jalaal Hartley) and arrives in Chatsworth with her children midway through the eleventh series. She strikes up a friendship with Frank Gallagher (David Threlfall) due to her wild behaviour. She is warm, bubbly and loves her family. Throughout the series, she often clashes with Mimi Tutton (Tina Malone). Overall, Esther appeared in 10 episodes.

=== Tam Blanco ===
- Played by: Rhys Cadman (Series 11)

Tam Blanco
- Shameless character
- Portrayed by: Rhys Cadman
- Duration: 2013
- First appearance: 5 March 2013; Series 11 Episode 2 "An Inspector Calls"
- Last appearance: 28 May 2013; Series 11 Episode 14 "End of the Line"
- Created by: Paul Abbott
- Introduced by: George Faber
In-universe information
- Father: Kassi Blanco
- Mother: Esther Blanco
- Brothers: Saul Blanco
- Sisters: Thalia Blanco
- Grandfathers: Adi Blanco
- Uncles: Jamie Maguire
- First cousins: Connor Maguire

Tam Blanco is the oldest son of Kassi (Jalaal Hartley) and Esther Blanco (Isy Suttie). He is the second Blanco to be introduced and becomes a regular character midway through Series 11. He becomes friends with Aidan Croker (Robbie Conway) and is often seen getting up to no good. Tam appeared in 10 episodes overall.

=== Thalia Blanco ===
- Played by: Jade Kilduff (Series 11)

Thalia Blanco
- Shameless character
- Portrayed by: Jade Kilduff
- Duration: 2013
- First appearance: 19 March 2013; Series 11 Episode 4 "No-One's Perfect"
- Last appearance: 28 May 2013; Series 11 Episode 14 "End of the Line"
- Created by: Paul Abbott
- Introduced by: George Faber
In-universe information
- Father: Kassi Blanco
- Mother: Esther Blanco
- Brothers: Saul Blanco; Tam Blanco
- Grandfathers: Adi Blanco
- Uncles: Jamie Maguire
- First cousins: Connor Maguire

Thalia Blanco is the only daughter and second child of Kassi (Jalaal Hartley) and Esther Blanco (Isy Suttie). When she moves to Chatsworth with her family, she is horrified by the estate and thinks herself better than Chatsworth life. She is quite rebellious and very manipulative for her age, being able to easily win round her mother. She is also a bully who often teases her brother Saul (Lewis Hardaker), and is often seen being spiteful to Stella Gallagher (Nikita Brownlee). Thalia appeared in 6 episodes.

=== Saul Blanco ===
- Played by: Lewis Hardaker (Series 11)

Saul Blanco
- Shameless character
- Portrayed by: Lewis Hardaker
- Duration: 2013
- First appearance: 19 March 2013; Series 11 Episode 4 "No-One's Perfect"
- Last appearance: 28 May 2013; Series 11 Episode 14 "End of the Line"
- Created by: Paul Abbott
- Introduced by: George Faber
In-universe information
- Father: Kassi Blanco
- Mother: Esther Blanco
- Brothers: Tam Blanco
- Sisters: Thalia Blanco
- Grandfathers: Adi Blanco
- Uncles: Jamie Maguire
- First cousins: Connor Maguire

Saul Blanco is the youngest son of Kassi (Jalaal Hartley) and Esther Blanco (Isy Suttie). He moves to Chatsworth with his siblings and mother when his father loses their family home. He is very adventurous and later joins the Scouts. He is often the victim of jokes by his sister Thalia (Jade Kilduff) and brother Tam (Rhys Cadman), being easily corrupted by the latter. Saul appeared in 9 episodes in total.

== Other characters ==
=== Tony ===
- Played by: Anthony Flanagan (Series 1–3)

Tony
- Shameless character
- Portrayed by: Anthony Flanagan
- Duration: 2004–2006
- First appearance: 13 January 2004; Series 1 Episode 1 "Meet the Gallaghers"
- Last appearance: 21 February 2006; Series 3 Episode 8 "The Wedding"
- Created by: Paul Abbott
- Introduced by: George Faber
In-universe information
- Occupation: Police Constable

Tony was a police officer who often monitored crime in the Chatsworth area, alongside his colleague and close friend Stan Waterman (Warren Donnelly). He appeared whenever the Gallaghers or the local residents got into trouble with police. He was madly in love with Fiona Gallagher (Anne-Marie Duff) and resented her criminal boyfriend Steve McBride (James McAvoy). Although he attempted to nail him, Tony ended up being corrupted by Steve's wealth and became his "man on the inside". He tried to frame Steve for a drugs running scam, which resulted in Steve absconding from Chatsworth without Fiona. In his last regular appearance, Tony assisted the Gallaghers in framing a corrupt police officer called Neary after he framed Lip Gallagher (Jody Latham) for a burglary. In series 3, he became a recurring character and was only seen in few episodes for a brief appearance. He was last seen in the final episode of the third series when Sheila Jackson (Maggie O'Neill) visited the police station to confess to murdering her abusive first husband. But later changed her mind. Antony Flanagan did not return for the fourth series and Tony's role as Stan's police partner was replaced by PC Tom O'Leary (Michael Legge). In the first episode of series 4, Stan hinted that Tony was no longer working at Chatsworth police station. Tony appeared in 17 episodes overall.

=== Jez ===
- Played by: Lindsey Dawson (Series 1–4)

Jez
- Shameless character
- Portrayed by: Lindsey Dawson
- Duration: 2004–2007
- First appearance: 20 January 2004; Series 1 Episode 2 "We're Going to The Moon"
- Last appearance: 13 February 2007; Series 4 Episode 6 "Dangerous Situation"
- Created by: Paul Abbott
- Introduced by: George Faber
In-universe information
- Occupation: Pub landlady
- Sons: Jason (surrogate)

Jessie McQueen, better known as Jez was the landlady of The Jockey on the Chatsworth estate during the first four series. She was a lesbian constantly looking for love, which she tried to seek from Norma Starkey (Dystin Johnson) and Karen Jackson (Rebecca Atkinson), who told her she was a lesbian so that she could get a job at the pub. She later discovered the truth and the two women became good friends, running The Jockey together. In series 4, she employed murderer Jamie Maguire (Aaron McCusker) as barman out of fear of retribution if she didn't. She became a surrogate mother and left Carol Fisher (Marjorie Yates) to run The Jockey whilst she was on maternity leave. After giving birth, she didn't return to The Jockey or Chatsworth, last being mentioned when The Jockey punters wanted to send her get-well cards after she had the baby. She has not been heard or seen since going on maternity leave, and she completely lost control of the Jockey when the brewery appointed Karen as landlady. In the last episode of series 4, her name is visible on the sign over The Jockey's entrance.

Jez appeared in 28 episodes.

=== Stan Waterman ===
- Played by: Warren Donnelly (Series 1–7)

Stan Waterman
- Shameless character
- Portrayed by: Warren Donnelly
- Duration: 2004–2010
- First appearance: 17 February 2004; Series 1 Episode 6 "Monica Comes Home (Part 1 of 2)"
- Last appearance: 2 February 2010; Series 7 Episode 3 "Out of Control"
- Created by: Paul Abbott
- Introduced by: George Faber
In-universe information
- Occupation: Police officer

Stanley Dennis "Stan" Waterman (born 1 June 1965) was one of the estate's community policing officers. He is generally friendly, and treated as one of the estate, and is usually willing to bend the rules to help out when the Gallaghers get in trouble. He worked alongside fellow police officer Tony (Anthony Flanagan) in early series. His mother was mentioned in a Christmas special when he phoned her to tell her not to eat contaminated meat, she later died in the same episode. Stan is later usually seen working with new police recruits Carrie Rogers (Amanda Ryan), who's an aggressive yet crooked cop, and Tom O'Leary (Michael Legge). In series 5 he begins a relationship with shop owner Yvonne Karib (Kelli Hollis). When he asks her to marry him, she reveals that she can't because her husband, Kash (Chris Bisson), is not actually dead.

In Series 7, Paddy Maguire (Sean Gilder) demands repayment of a loan he gave to Yvonne. Stan is then severely beaten by an unknown assailant. Yvonne and Stan assume Paddy was behind the attack and move away, selling the shop to Joe Pritchard (Ben Batt), who was actually the culprit who attacked Stan. Stan appeared in 45 episodes overall.

=== Norma Starkey ===
- Played by: Dystin Johnson (Series 1, 3, 4–6)

Norma Starkey
- Shameless character
- Portrayed by: Dystin Johnson
- Duration: 2004, 2006, 2007–2009
- First appearance: 17 February 2004; Series 1 Episode 6 "Monica Comes Home (Part 1 of 2)"
- Last appearance: 12 May 2009; Series 6 Episode 16 "It's Over"
- Created by: Paul Abbott
- Introduced by: George Faber
In-universe information
- Occupation: Lorry driver

Norma Starkey (born 18 July 1969) is a lorry driver. It is likely that she is from Newcastle upon Tyne. Although it is never explicitly stated onscreen, she does possess a strong North East accent. Norma was previously Monica Gallagher's (Annabelle Apsion) lesbian lover after her split from Frank Gallagher (David Threlfall). She is introduced in the series when Frank convinces Sheila to ring Monica to tell her that she has won a teddy bear in a contest. Frank does this in order to discover Monica's whereabouts so that he can obtain child support payments from her. Throughout the series, he occasionally calls her "Shrek".

Norma accompanies Monica back to the Gallagher home in series 4, and lives in the Dormobile in the garden. She is infatuated with Monica and continues to express her strong feelings for her lover even when Monica ignores her and endeavours to capture Frank's attention. Having initially been characterised as a strong-willed and capable woman, Norma is increasingly portrayed as vulnerable and helpless. In series 4, Norma reveals that before her relationship with Monica, she spent time in prison. Norma expresses dissatisfaction with her living conditions, much to Debbie Gallagher's (Rebecca Ryan) annoyance who tells her to "put some effort in" after saying that she mooches off them almost as much as her parents do. This prompts Norma to erect a white picket fence around the Dormobile. She also is a person upon whom other members of the family can depend. For example, when Liam Gallagher (Johnny Bennett) is granted the opportunity to attend school abroad, she willingly pretends to be Frank's wife. She also proves herself to be a good listener when she gives Carl Gallagher (Elliott Tittensor) advice, even though Carl makes it blatantly obvious that he does not like Norma and wants his mother.

In series 6, Monica, feeling underappreciated, flees the Gallagher household once more. Once again, she states that she is going out to purchase a loaf of bread and disappears. Despite feeling abandoned by the only woman she loves, Norma chooses to remain at the Gallagher house, having grown attached to most of the family however, her departure from the show is unexplained. Norma appeared in 38 episodes in total.

=== Lillian Tyler ===
- Played by: Alice Barry (Series 2–11)

Lillian Tyler
- Shameless character
- Portrayed by: Alice Barry
- Duration: 2004–2013
- First appearance: 23 December 2004; Christmas Special "Christmas in Chatsworth"
- Last appearance: 28 May 2013; Series 11 Episode 14 "End of the Line"
- Created by: Paul Abbott
- Introduced by: George Faber
In-universe information
- Occupation: Brothel owner
- Husband: Brendan Tyler (deceased)
- Sons: Rodney Tyler
- Adoptive daughters: Bonnie Tyler (deceased)

Lillian Tyler (born 1947, but when The Jockey was to be blown up in series 7, Lillian's year of birth was shown as 1870), is a local busy-body. She had an affair with her friend Carol Fisher's (Marjorie Yates) husband in the 1970s, which results in a catfight in The Jockey. Her husband, Brendan Tyler, was accidentally shot dead by Carl Gallagher (Elliott Tittensor). As of series 5, Lillian has appeared much more in the show, even becoming narrator for episode 7. Lillian also runs a brothel at her home, a means to making easy money, after Kelly Maguire (Sally Carman) moves in with her. Frank Gallagher (David Threlfall) often makes reference to her resemblance to Mel B's caricature from the TV series Bo Selecta!. In series 6 it is revealed she has a son called Rodney, and she appears not to like him, and feels that he is a waste of space. Lillian appeared in 118 episodes in total.

Lillian was revealed during series 2 to suffer narcolepsy, when she was questioned by the police about medication she used, suspecting that her late husband Brendan may have been killed due to a gang-based turf war over drugs. In the later series, it is revealed that Lillian is an illegal immigrant, after being born in South Africa before moving to England.

As of the fourth series, Lillian has become more involved in the dramas around Chatsworth, even featuring in some of them herself, she serves as the comic relief of the show appearing in many after-credit snippets.

=== Lena Marshall ===
- Played by: Brana Bajic (Series 2)

Lena Marshall
- Shameless character
- Portrayed by: Brana Bajic
- Duration: 2005
- First appearance: 1 February 2005; Series 2 Episode 5 "Crooks and Robbers"
- Last appearance: 8 March 2005; Series 2 Episode 10 "True Love"
- Created by: Paul Abbott
- Introduced by: George Faber
In-universe information
- Occupation: Nurse

Lena Marshall is a nurse who was a recurring character in the second series. She began a sexual affair with 16-year-old Lip Gallagher (Jody Latham) after meeting him when he was accused of robbing her house. Their affair ends sometime after the end of series 2. She appeared in 5 episodes.

=== Craig Garland ===
- Played by: Chris Coghill (Series 2–3)

Craig Garland
- Shameless character
- Portrayed by: Chris Coghill
- Duration: 2005–2006
- First appearance: 8 February 2005; Series 2 Episode 6 "Welcome to the Family"
- Last appearance: 14 February 2006; Series 3 Episode 7 "Act Your Age"
- Created by: Paul Abbott
- Introduced by: George Faber
In-universe information
- Sisters: Tracy; Unnamed
- Wife: Sue Garland (1997–2005)
- Children: Unnamed son

Craig Garland is the ex-boyfriend of Fiona Gallagher (Anne-Marie Duff) and the father of her baby. He is also the ex-husband of Sue Garland (Gillian Kearney). He enters a short-lived relationship with Fiona when he discovers she is pregnant after they had a one-night stand. He is devastated when she absconds with her ex-boyfriend Steve McBride (James McAvoy). He reappears briefly during series 3 when Sue hides at his house after getting into money troubles. He was last seen having a confrontation with Marty Fisher (Jack Deam) after telling him about Sue's money issues. Craig appeared in 5 episodes overall. When Fiona returns for the final episode, it is revealed she gave birth to his son.

=== Tom O'Leary ===
- Played by: Michael Legge (Series 4–6)

Tom O'Leary
- Shameless character
- Portrayed by: Michael Legge
- Duration: 2007–2009
- First appearance: 9 January 2007; Series 4 Episode 1 "New Beginnings"
- Last appearance: 3 March 2009; Series 6 Episode 6 "Breaking Point"
- Created by: Paul Abbott
- Introduced by: George Faber
In-universe information
- Occupation: Policeman
- Mother: Patricia

Tom O'Leary (born 1981) is one of Chatsworth Estate's policemen. He was introduced in series 4. Although a minor background character for much of his appearance on the series, he rose to prominence by briefly becoming the boyfriend of Debbie Gallagher (Rebecca Ryan). In his final appearance, he leaves Chatsworth after breaking Police code for unlawfully breaking into the Gallaghers' house and leaving a present for Debbie, showing he has feeling despite being friends after their relationship ended. He bids Stan farewell in the same episode Carrie leaves after informing a senior officer of his relationship with Debbie which began when she was underaged. Tom appeared in 25 episodes overall.

=== Carrie Rogers ===
- Played by: Amanda Ryan (Series 4–6)

Carrie Rogers
- Shameless character
- Portrayed by: Amanda Ryan
- Duration: 2007–2009
- First appearance: 23 January 2007; Series 4 Episode 3 "You Decide"
- Last appearance: 3 March 2009; Series 6 Episode 6 "Breaking Point"
In-universe information
- Other names: Wendy Rogers (real name)
- Occupation: Policewoman
- Sisters: Carrie Rogers

Carrie Rogers (real name Wendy Rogers) is one of Chatsworth Estates police officers, she is known to be more aggressive than most of the cops in Chatsworth, views the residents as crooks and will instantly use brute force to get answers, and when she gets herself into trouble tries to seduce anyone who might report her, as the series continues it's shown that she is a crooked cop working for Paddy Maguire (Sean Gilder) to clear her debt by doing favours for him within the force, she leaves Chatsworth in series 6 after receiving a promotion, not before filing a report on Stan Waterman (Warren Donnelly). Carrie appeared in 21 episodes in total.

=== Joe Pritchard ===
- Played by: Ben Batt (Series 6–7)

Joe Pritchard
- Shameless character
- Portrayed by: Ben Batt
- Duration: 2009–2010
- First appearance: 3 February 2009; Series 6 Episode 2 "Trouble in Paradise"
- Last appearance: 11 May 2010; Series 7 Episode 16 "Gang Wars"
- Created by: Paul Abbott
- Introduced by: George Faber
In-universe information
- Occupation: Accountant/Businessman
- Father: Alan Gareth Pritchard

Joe Pritchard (11 May 1981 – May 2010) was the main antagonist of S6-7 of Shameless (UK); he was first introduced as the boyfriend of Mandy Maguire (Samantha Siddall). He appeared in 30 episodes overall. Joe works as an accountant, and captains a local amateur football team in Chatsworth. Joe briefly became friends with Mandy's older brother Jamie Maguire (Aaron McCusker), and took advantage of his turbulent relationship with Jamie's wife, Karen Maguire (Rebecca Atkinson), and had sex with her twice. Joe would use this incident to blackmail Karen, who was the first to suspect that Mandy was being repeatedly assaulted by him, revealing him as a sadistic sociopath. Eventually, Jamie found out about the bruises on Mandy's body, and confronted Joe at The Jockey, and beat him within an inch of his life. Sending Joe into a temporary coma. Mandy and Jamie's mother, Mimi (Tina Malone), claimed to be responsible for attacking Joe, and was sentenced to two months imprisonment. Joe recovered, and after Mandy decided to give their relationship another chance, Joe was separately visited in hospital by Karen, Jamie, Paddy (Sean Gilder), Shane (Nicky Evans), Micky (Ciarán Griffiths), and Kelly (Sally Carman). All of them threatened to kill Joe if he ever laid another hand on Mandy again. Joe was intimidated by their show of force.

It is shown in Series 7 that Joe continues his secret relationship with Karen and delivered her newborn son Connor Joseph Maguire whilst the rest of the family was absent. Joe distanced himself from Karen during and after her mental breakdown, but they continued to have feelings for each other. Joe also bought Yvonne Karib's (Kelli Hollis) "Kash and Carry" store after learning that she borrowed money off Paddy, as she was already in enough debt. One of the reasons for Yvonne's quick departure with Stan Waterman (Warren Donnelly) was that Stan was beaten up by a masked assailant. They assume Paddy is involved, not knowing Joe himself had beaten Stan in his plans to help convince them to leave. Joe also took over looking after Chesney Karib (Qasim Akhtar), not doing a great job, as Chesney was soon embroiled in a murder investigation. However, the drug-dealer who framed Carl Gallagher (Elliott Tittensor) and Chesney, called Jimmy D, in his desperation to prevent them from informing the police of the murder he committed, roams around Chatsworth with his associates, terrorising the neighbourhood, and stepping on the toes of the Maguire family in the process. Shane declares Jimmy a marked man. The next morning, Chesney is still hiding in the shop when Joe assures him that things are going to turn out okay. Then a flashback is shown that during Shane's interrogation of rival gang-members for Jimmy's whereabouts, Joe had attacked and presumably murdered Jimmy.

Joe's temper flares up as he drives Lillian Tyler (Alice Barry), from his shop. He gets into an argument with Karen being a female dog and over their sex lives since their breakup, but when Karen tries to taunt him into another tryst, he refuses. He decides to go to anger management to rebuild his life. Karen continues to try to make him boil over, but finally she attends one of his meetings and is impressed by the effort he's making to move on.

When Joe is having a birthday party in The Jockey, he learns his father has died. In spite of Joe seeing his father as a selfish failure, his death is a system shock, and Joe begins trying to reclaim Karen and Connor, whom he continues to see as their son. Joe and Karen resume their affair, but Karen is afraid to tell Jamie the truth. After his father's funeral, Joe finally tells Jamie the entire truth. Joe and Karen hide out at his shop. Joe sees Jamie waiting outside, and expects a fight, only to be devastated when Jamie shows him his father's corpse, dug up and dumped outside Joe's shop. On seeing the corpse, Joe vomits and Karen screams and falls over. Joe buries his father again, and becomes more determined to take Connor from the Maguires. Joe later implies that he had Paddy killed after Karen expressed concerns over Paddy taking revenge on them. After running away with Karen with baby Connor, and Ian hiding in the boot unknowingly to Joe, Karen tells Joe that she doesn't love him. He goes into a rage, and strangles Karen while demanding her to tell him that she loves him. She is struggling for breath, and Ian Gallagher (Gerard Kearns) can hear the action outside. He jumps out of the boot and seemingly kills Joe by hitting him twice on the back of the head with a pipe wrench.
