= List of Shameless (British TV series) episodes =

Shameless is a British comedy series set in Manchester on the fictional Chatsworth council estate, created and partially written by Paul Abbott, who is also the programme's executive producer. Produced by Company Pictures for Channel 4, the series aired from 13 January 2004 to 28 May 2013. The comedy drama, centred on British working class culture, was accorded critical acclaim by various sections of the British media, including the newspaper The Sun and Newsnight Review on BBC Two. In 2005, the show won "Best Drama Series" at the BAFTA TV Awards and "Best TV Comedy Drama" at the British Comedy Awards. The network Showtime adapted the series into its own American version, which debuted in 2011.

During the course of the programme, 139 episodes of Shameless aired over eleven series.

== Series overview ==
| Series | Episodes | Originally released | |
| Series | Episodes | First released | Last released |
|---|---|---|---|
| 1 | 7 | 13 January 2004 | 24 February 2004 |
| 2 | 10 | 4 January 2005 | 8 March 2005 |
| 3 | 8 | 10 January 2006 | 21 February 2006 |
| 4 | 8 | 9 January 2007 | 27 February 2007 |
| 5 | 16 | 1 January 2008 | 15 April 2008 |
| 6 | 16 | 27 January 2009 | 12 May 2009 |
| 7 | 16 | 26 January 2010 | 11 May 2010 |
| 8 | 22 | 10 January 2011 | 25 October 2011 |
| 9 | 11 | 9 January 2012 | 13 March 2012 |
| 10 | 10 | 12 September 2012 | 1 November 2012 |
| 11 | 14 | 26 February 2013 | 28 May 2013 |

== Episodes ==
=== Series 1 (2004) ===
| No. overall | No. in series | Title | Directed by | Written by | Original release date | Viewers (millions) |
|---|---|---|---|---|---|---|
| 1 | 1 | "Meet the Gallaghers" | Mark Mylod | Paul Abbott | 13 January 2004 | 2.65 |
When Fiona Gallagher's (Anne-Marie Duff) bag is stolen on a night out in Manchester, a handsome stranger called Steve McBride (James McAvoy) comes to her rescue. He accompanies her to her home in Chatsworth, a deprived inner city council estate, to meet her large family, and the pair begin to grow close, until she receives a visit from the police concerning her alcoholic father, Frank (David Threlfall). Meanwhile, Lip Gallagher (Jody Latham) makes a shocking discovery about his brother Ian (Gerard Kearns) that turns the brothers close relationship upside down, and he also uncovers a shocking secret about the local shopkeeper, Kash Karib (Chris Bisson). Elsewhere, Karen Jackson's (Rebecca Atkinson) father, Eddie (Steve Pemberton), leaves home after catching her in a compromising position. First Appearance: Frank Gallagher, Fiona Gallagher, Lip Gallagher, Ian Gallagher, Debbie Gallagher, Carl Gallagher, Liam Gallagher, Veronica Fisher, Kev Ball, Steve McBride, Karen Jackson, Eddie Jackson, Sheila Jackson, PC Tony, Kash Karib and Yvonne Karib Voice-over: Frank Gallagher
| 2 | 2 | "We're Going to the Moon" | Jonny Campbell | Paul Abbott | 20 January 2004 | 2.77 |
After Karen's father Eddie attacks Frank in The Jockey, Frank returns home and attacks his son, Ian, and Fiona's boyfriend, Steve. Certain he's got a family he doesn't deserve, a vengeful Steve kidnaps a drunken Frank and dumps him in France without telling anyone. While Frank lands himself in trouble with the French authorities, a body is found in the canal at home, and everyone assumes it is Frank. Will the feckless patriarch ever make it home? And how will Fiona react when she discovers what Steve has done? Meanwhile, Karen's agoraphobic mother, Sheila Jackson (Maggie O'Neill), finds a new man, Kev (Dean Lennox Kelly) and Veronica Ball (Maxine Peake) fall out over money, and a local copper PC Tony (Anthony Flanagan) has fallen in love with Fiona. First Appearance: Jez Final Appearance: Eddie Jackson Voice-over: Fiona Gallagher
| 3 | 3 | "We're Getting Married" | Jonny Campbell | Daniel Brocklehurst | 27 January 2004 | 2.46 |
It's Friday night in The Jockey, and barman Kev says he will marry his longtime girlfriend, Veronica, in order to deter the advances of a group of ladies. However, Frank overhears and announces it to the entire pub... including Veronica's mother, Carol Fisher (Marjorie Yates). In a corner, Kev proposes to Veronica, and the pair plan a wedding on the cheap with the help of the Gallaghers, but Kev has failed to tell Veronica that he is already married and turns to Steve and Fiona for help. To make matters worse, Veronica's arsonist brother, Marty Fisher (Jack Deam), has escaped from prison. Meanwhile, Ian is forced into hiding after turning down the advances of Mandy Maguire (Samantha Siddall) - most popular girl in school and only daughter of the toughest family on the estate - feeling humiliated, she spreads lies and sends her brothers after him. When Lip and Kash are caught in the crossfire, Ian has to decide whether to flee Chatsworth for good or admit the truth about his sexuality. First Appearance: Carol Fisher, Marty Fisher and Mandy Maguire Voice-over: Veronica Fisher
| 4 | 4 | "Abduction" | Mark Mylod | Paul Abbott | 3 February 2004 | 2.18 |
Debbie Gallagher (Rebecca Ryan) takes a young child, Jody, from his birthday party and dresses him up as a girl. With Frank's assistance, the Chatsworth residents join forces en masse in order to find Jody. The Gallaghers are horrified by Debbie's actions and now face the impossible task of returning the child home without incriminating themselves. Meanwhile, Karen is on a mission to seduce her mother's boyfriend - who is also her boyfriend's father, whilst Veronica has got a new hairstyle. Voice-over: Steve McBride
| 5 | 5 | "Affairs" | Mark Mylod | Carmel Morgan | 10 February 2004 | 2.63 |
Frank continues his passionate affair with Karen, even though she is dating his son, Lip, and he is dating her mother, Sheila. Things begin spiralling out of control when Steve discovers the affair, and the penny finally drops for Lip when she dumps him, leading to a violent showdown between him and Frank. Meanwhile, Yvonne Karib (Kelli Hollis) discovers Kash is having an affair with Ian after watching the shop's CCTV footage, but they are both shocked by her reaction. The Gallagher boys parents' evening throws Fiona into a panic, while Veronica goes to saucy lengths to pay off her catalogue debt. Voice-over: Lip Gallagher
| 6 | 6 | "Monica Comes Home (Part 1 of 2)" | Dearbhla Walsh | Paul Abbott | 17 February 2004 | 2.81 |
Bailiffs reclaim old debts from Frank, and, as usual, his children are forced to pay the price. If that is not enough, Mr. Wilson (Clive Russell), a housing officer with a personal vendetta against Frank, is threatening to take the family home. Frank, however, is busy trying to get money out of his ex-wife, Monica Gallagher (Annabelle Apsion). With Kev's assistance, Frank manages to fool Monica, but he makes the mistake of letting her know he is after her. The pair are chased back to Chatsworth by Monica and her lesbian lover, Norma Starkey (Dystin Johnson), leading to a rollercoaster of emotions within the fractured family. Meanwhile, Tony's love for Fiona reaches new depths when he asks her to marry him. First Appearance: Stan Waterman, Monica Gallagher and Norma Starkey Voice-over: Debbie Gallagher
| 7 | 7 | "Dead (Part 2 of 2)" | Dearbhla Walsh | Paul Abbott | 24 February 2004 | 2.48 |
Monica and Norma are ruling the roost at the Gallagher household after Fiona moves in with Steve, but none of the Gallagher kids are happy by their mother's return. Frank is desperate to make contact with his estranged wife, but first, he must deal with his growing debts, two debt collectors watching his every move, the threat of homelessness for his entire family, and Monica's aggressive girlfriend, Norma. However, it's his new rival Norma who comes up with the perfect solution: fake his own death so his debts die with him, but Monica and Norma may have an ulterior motive for offering to help. Meanwhile, Sheila tries to overcome her agoraphobia with Debbie's help, whilst harbouring a life-changing secret, and it seems Steve's days as a free man are numbered when a jealous Tony discovers the source of his fortune. Final Appearance: Monica Gallagher and Norma Starkey (until series 3) Voice-over: Frank Gallagher

=== Series 2 (2005) ===
| No. overall | No. in series | Title | Directed by | Written by | Original release date | Viewers (millions) |
|---|---|---|---|---|---|---|
| 8 | – | "Christmas in Chatsworth" | Jonny Campbell | Paul Abbott | 23 December 2004 | 2.47 |
It's Christmas in Chatsworth, and Kev and Lip rob a van load of meat to make a big profit on the estate. However, the meat is for experimental purposes and the army descend on Manchester and quarantine the estate on Christmas Eve to prevent an epidemic, causing chaos to converge on the streets and riots to begin. But many residents have already fallen victim - including Ian. Meanwhile, Sheila is eagerly awaiting the arrival of another Gallagher baby. But when she goes into labour at the Gallagher household with only Steve and Kash's mother by her side, there is a shock in store for all. But Frank is nowhere to be seen. Elsewhere, arsonist Marty is released from prison. But after finding his mother Carol in bed with his best friend, he torches her house, forcing Veronica to let them move in with her and Kev. Voice-over: Debbie Gallagher First appearance: Lillian Tyler Note: This is the only Christmas-themed episode of Shameless, except for S8/E21, where Mickey stages a Nativity play in the Jockey.
| 9 | 1 | "Grandad" | David Evans | Paul Abbott | 4 January 2005 | 2.53 |
Neville Gallagher (John Woodvine), Frank's estranged father, arrives in Chatsworth to meet his new grandchildren. While the rest of the family welcome him with open arms, Frank finds his world turned upside down, as he is forced to relive painful memories from his childhood. Meanwhile, Karen returns to Chatsworth and gets herself a job at The Jockey and soon instigates a feud with Veronica by getting too close to Kev. Elsewhere, the Gallagher house has been split in two, with Fiona and Steve having bought the house next door. Voice-over: Sheila Jackson
| 10 | 2 | "Eric" | Peter Lydon | Daniel Brockelhurst | 11 January 2005 | 3.11 |
Frank takes a call at Kev and Veronica's house during their anniversary party, but only much later does he pass on the message: Social Services are coming tomorrow to discuss fostering. Kev and Veronica are shocked when they receive a child, Eric, for a trial week of foster care. Kev discovers Eric is being bullied by girls and, with Frank's assistance, he accidentally makes the situation a lot worse. Desperate to be a "good dad", Kev toughens Eric up with a series of boxing lessons - an act he may live to regret. Meanwhile, Steve makes the mistake of stealing the car of a police inspector, and it falls on Tony to get him out of trouble. Carol's latest romance with a Spanish toyboy leaves Marty on the warpath, leaving Fiona fearful that he will return to his old ways and endanger all their lives. Voice-over: Frank Gallagher
| 11 | 3 | "The Garden Competition" | Peter Lydon | Daniel Brockelhurst | 18 January 2005 | 2.77 |
A garden competition sparks off a feud between Veronica and Carol, and Veronica's bitterness towards her mother alienates her friends and family, even Kev and Fiona. She is pushed further over the edge when she is uninvited to Carol's birthday party, where she overhears a shocking revelation that tears her and Kev apart. Meanwhile, Frank and his friend Tommy turn Sheila's house into a drinking den after The Jockey is closed down while she is away visiting her mother. But Frank accidentally loses one of the twins to an alcoholic transvestite called "Psycho Sally". Elsewhere, Fiona is convinced Steve is having an affair with a woman named Kerry-Anne, but the truth is worse than she could have imagined. Voice-over: Fiona Gallagher
| 12 | 4 | "The Big Day" | Dearbhla Walsh | Paul Abbott | 25 January 2005 | 2.43 |
Preparations for Fiona and Steve's wedding are underway in the Gallagher household. In the days leading up to the wedding, Steve falls in with a group of ruthless criminals, convinced that this job will set him and the rest of the Gallaghers up for life. Things turn nasty when a vengeful Tony begins operating against Steve, and a deadly showdown at a warehouse sparks off a chain of events that changes life for the Gallaghers forever. Meanwhile, Ian recruits Mandy to be his "fake girlfriend" after Frank nearly rumbles his big secret. Carol goes on a cruise, leaving Marty in charge of her beloved dog. Voice-over: Veronica Fisher Final appearance: Steve McBride (as a regular)
| 13 | 5 | "Crooks and Robbers" | Dearbhla Walsh | Phil Nodding | 1 February 2005 | 2.55 |
When Sheila asks Lip to water her friend's plants while she is away, he begins using the house to get some peace and quiet, away from his chaotic family, to do homework. But when he returns one night, he discovers the house has been burgled, and he is arrested by a bent copper with a grudge to bear. To make matters worse, Frank is called into the police station to represent him and ends up making matters a lot worse for his son. With Lip facing a prison stretch, Fiona, Tony and Frank attempt to deal with the bent copper, while Ian, Marty, and Carl Gallagher (Elliott Tittensor) find themselves taking part in a burglary. Meanwhile, Debbie begins a VHS business, and Carl discovers a video of the local lollypop woman having an affair with another man. The video starts spreading around Chatsworth, leaving the residents wondering who the mystery man is, with the culprit eventually being revealed as local policeman, Stan Waterman (Warren Donnelly). Elsewhere, Fiona is still missing Steve, and Tony's attempts to help only make things worse for her. Voice-over: Lip Gallagher
| 14 | 6 | "Welcome to the Family" | Dearbhla Walsh | Daniel Brockelhurst | 8 February 2005 | 2.96 |
Lip is sleeping with Mandy while she is pretending to be Ian's girlfriend to hide the fact that he is gay. However, after Mandy falls pregnant with Lip's baby, everyone begins to think the child is Ian's, so the Maguire family welcome him into the family with the threat of castration if he and Mandy do not marry. When Ian announces their engagement, the Gallaghers and Maguires throw a party at The Jockey, but a revelation from Lip turns the happy occasion into an evening of chaos and bloodshed. Meanwhile, Frank is left debt-ridden by Cassie Weston (Moya Brady), The Jockey's new landlady. He must come up with a way to pay back his years of free booze. Unfortunately for him, she might have just the solution. But their plan is foiled by a devious Karen. Elsewhere, Sheila cold-turkeys her tablets, leaving her convinced that the twins are monsters, while a late-night encounter with a tearaway teenager brings a new man into Fiona's life. Voice-over: Carl Gallagher First appearance: Paddy Maguire, Mimi Maguire and Craig Garland
| 15 | 7 | "Joey Dawson?" | David Evans | Amanda Coe | 15 February 2005 | 2.99 |
After Ladies Night at The Jockey, Fiona wakes up in bed with soon-to-be-married Joey Dawson, and she is forced to pay the price when Liam Gallagher (Johnny Bennett) is rushed to hospital after swallowing some pills. Social Services are alerted and a full assessment of the Gallagher family gets underway. Fiona is panicked to discover the woman in charge of the family's review is none other than her old school enemy, Katrina Webb, who also turns out to be the future Mrs Dawson, and just when it seems all is lost for the Gallaghers, an unlikely figure saves the day: Frank. Meanwhile, a visit to the hospital has devastating consequences for Ian when he discovers that Frank is not his biological father, sending him on a desperate search to find his real father. But what will he find? Voice-over: Ian Gallagher
| 16 | 8 | "Against The Odds" | David Evans | John Griffin | 22 February 2005 | 2.50 |
After being hit in the mouth by Kash's shop door, Frank falls foul of two shifty accident claims salesmen, who persuade him to sue the Karibs. Kash and Yvonne cannot afford to pay out Frank's claims and are forced to close the shop, which enrages the Chatsworth community, who turn against Frank and Sheila. But Frank soon discovers saving the shop and the community will lead him into further trouble. Meanwhile, Fiona discovers she is pregnant, and with money at an all-time low at the Gallaghers, Fiona wonders whether she should keep it. Faced with a huge decision, Fiona tracks down Craig Garland (Chris Coghill), the father, only to discover that he is married. Voice-over: Fiona Gallagher First appearance: Sue Garland
| 17 | 9 | "Sister, Sister" | Dearbhla Walsh | Daniel Brockelhurst | 1 March 2005 | 2.40 |
Kev's sister, Kelly (Sally Carman), arrives in Chatsworth on the run from her ex-boyfriend, an aggressive junkie. She is desperate to retrieve her things from his flat, so Kev and Frank decide to step in and help her. However, Veronica soon discovers everything is not what it seems - and Kelly may be hiding a dark addiction herself. Meanwhile, Fiona is suffering from morning sickness, so Craig is planning a surprise trip to Wales to relax. Craig's wife, Sue (Gillian Kearney), is jealous of his new relationship and seeks solace in Marty. But when Sue breaks up with Marty, it leads him on a downward spiral which threatens to land him back in prison, forcing Debbie to take drastic actions. Elsewhere, tragedy strikes for Craig when he discovers his father has died. Voice-over: Debbie Gallagher First appearance: Kelly Ball
| 18 | 10 | "True Love" | Dearbhla Walsh | Paul Abbott | 8 March 2005 | 2.71 |
Fiona's life is turned upside down when Steve returns to Chatsworth, on the run, to persuade her to flee to Amsterdam with him, but she is torn whether to leave her family and Chatsworth forever, not to mention the father of her baby, Craig. Meanwhile, when Lillian Tyler's (Alice Barry) husband, Brendan, is killed, Frank sees a way to make some money and also manages to win him and Sheila the trip of a lifetime. However, he is forced to look after Lillian's irritating dog, Sadie, who proves to be quite indestructible. Elsewhere, Carl makes a shocking confession during a Gallagher family bust-up: he killed Lillian's husband Brendan. Can the Gallaghers cover up Carl's shocking crime? Voice-over: Kev Ball Final appearance: Fiona Gallagher (until series 11), Steve McBride

=== Series 3 (2006) ===
| No. overall | No. in series | Title | Directed by | Written by | Original release date | Viewers (millions) |
|---|---|---|---|---|---|---|
| 19 | 1 | "Liamday" | Catherine Morshead | Daniel Brockelhurst | 3 January 2006 | 2.56 |
After Liam denounces religion in school, Debbie has to act quick when the teachers request a home visit. She tells them that Liam has cancer and the news spreads around Chatsworth. Realising how serious Debbie's actions are, the Gallagher kids, along with Karen, Kev and Veronica, must go along with the charade, as preparations for a fund raising day organised by Jez get underway. However, the situation also forces Frank to confront his failings as a father, so he endures on a drink and drugs binge, with devastating results. Back at the Gallaghers', Monica and Norma return, and events finally come to a head at Liamday, the fund raising event. Meanwhile, Kev attends evening classes, but when his teacher tries to seduce him, Kev finds himself unable to resist her. Unable to fight temptation, Kev turns to Karen for help. However, she quickly uses his situation to have a little fun herself. Elsewhere, Marty is determined to raise a depressed Sue's spirits. Voice-over: Frank Gallagher
| 20 | 2 | "Dark Friends" | Catherine Morshead | Daniel Brockelhurst | 10 January 2006 | 2.86 |
Lip begins a hotel scam with his new friend, Jack, to make some easy money. He also uses his new friendship to get closer to Jack's sister. He may live to regret introducing him to the Gallaghers, however, when Ian begins an affair with Jack. However, Ian soon learns that Jack is not as straightforward as he seems when a violent robbery leaves Kash hospitalised. Determined to deal with Jack, Ian's attempt to convince Lip of his friend's dark side tears the Gallagher boys apart, with all roads leading to a violent showdown between the three boys at The Jockey's karaoke night. Meanwhile, Frank spots an opportunity to make money when Kelly, Kev's ex-junkie sister, arrives in Chatsworth looking for a place to stay. Kelly's numerous lovers reignites the spark in Frank and Sheila's sex life. However, Frank soon discovers that Kelly is a prostitute. Elsewhere, Debbie is annoyed that Sue is living at the Gallaghers without paying her way, so Marty becomes a handyman, soon finding himself in a compromising position with Lillian. Voice-over: Ian Gallagher
| 21 | 3 | "Baby" | Jim O'Hanlon | Bob Mills & Jim Poyser | 17 January 2006 | 3.17 |
A heavily pregnant Mandy is knocked over during a robbery at Kash's shop and gives birth to Lip's daughter, Katie, but the Maguires forbid contact. Eager to ally himself with Mandy's parents, Paddy (Sean Gilder) and Mimi Maguire (Tina Malone), Lip enlists Ian's help to find the robber responsible for the theft of a Maguire family heirloom. Will an encounter with an elderly person in a glory hole, a tortured deaf boy and a stand-off on a multi-storey car park clear the path for Lip and his new daughter? Meanwhile, Kev is given a racing tip not to be shared with anybody. Unlucky for him, Veronica tells Carol and she spreads the word around Chatsworth. Elsewhere, Sheila goes on strike as a skivvy when Frank forgets her birthday, sending him on a quest to find money to pay for a birthday present, while Sue attempts to fool Debbie into thinking she is not living at the Gallaghers so that she doesn't have to pay her way. Voice-over: Lip Gallagher First appearance: Katie Maguire
| 22 | 4 | "Benefit Fraud" | Catherine Morshead | Amanda Cole | 24 January 2006 | 3.10 |
When Carol discovers that Lillian slept with her husband, Brendan, years previously, she reports her for benefit fraud, and benefit officers swarm the estate. This causes a public outcry as half of Chatsworth are claiming. Frank impersonates Lillian's husband in order to protect his benefits, which upsets Sheila. Can Frank win her back by making the big commitment: marriage? Meanwhile, Carl falls for Lip's latest girlfriend, Emily, and poses as her brother in order to fool Social Services. However, his paranoia goes into overdrive when he becomes convinced Lip and Mandy are having an affair, leading to a confrontation between them and an angry stepfather with a baseball bat. Elsewhere, Tony is having trouble with women, so Sheila steps in to help him. Voice-over: Sheila Jackson
| 23 | 5 | "Old Flame" | Jim O'Hanlon | Daniel Brockelhurst | 31 January 2006 | 2.83 |
It's Kev's birthday, but he is in no mood to celebrate when he discovers his mother has committed suicide. Worse still, he is reunited with his violent, alcoholic ex-wife, Roxy (Jill Halfpenny), at the funeral, and she and Veronica end up fighting in The Jockey. When Veronica finds Kev in bed with Roxy the next morning, she refuses to believe his plea of innocence and makes plans to leave Chatsworth. However, Veronica's departure may be the least of Kev's worries when he discovers he may have fathered a child with Roxy. Meanwhile, Lip gets his first taste of fatherhood when baby Katie is left in his care for the weekend. Meanwhile, Carol begins dating a nudist. Voice-over: Veronica Ball
| 24 | 6 | "In with the Maguires" | David Threlfall | Emma Frost | 7 February 2006 | 3.24 |
The Gallaghers are pleased when Carl starts bringing money into the household, but Lip is horrified to discover his brother's mini-enterprise is dealing drugs for the Maguires, and when someone informs the police and Mandy finds herself behind bars, Mimi and her son Shane Maguire (Nicky Evans) launch a manhunt for Carl. It falls on Lip and Ian to uncover the real traitor, save their brother from a savage beating, and save Mandy from a prison stretch. Will Lip and Mandy finally confront their feelings for each other before it's too late? Meanwhile, Sheila becomes convinced Karen is a lesbian and invites her and Jez (Lindsey Dawson) to dinner, so Frank decides to play Karen at her own games. Voice-over: Carl Gallagher First Appearance: Shane Maguire
| 25 | 7 | "Act Your Age" | Paul Norton Walker | Story by : Amanda Cole & Phil Nodding, Amanda Cole | 14 February 2006 | 3.11 |
Marty discovers Sue is deep in debt and takes a great bargain to help his girlfriend, enduring the wrath of Carol. When an old face delivers a shocking secret, Sue runs from her troubles, and Marty reverts to his old ways. Meanwhile, Frank becomes a medical guinea pig and is left devastated when he discovers the drugs he has been taking leave him unable to get drunk, unearthing a new, realistic side of himself, which threatens his relationship with Sheila. Elsewhere, Debbie falls in with a crowd of people her own age, and, realising what she has been missing out on, quits her job of running the Gallagher household, leaving Lip, Ian and hapless Carl in charge, while Kev is forced to confront his fear of flying when Veronica plans a holiday abroad. Voice-over: Debbie Gallagher Final appearance: Craig Garland
| 26 | 8 | "The Wedding" | Paul Norton Walker | Amanda Cole | 21 February 2006 | 3.21 |
The day of Frank's wedding to Sheila draws near, but he begins to get cold feet when she confesses to murdering an abusive previous husband, Sheldon. Kev and Veronica are forced to intervene when it looks like the wedding could be called off. Frank must decide whether he loves Sheila enough to deal with her dark secrets, and it's a race against time for him when Sheila decides to confess to the police. Meanwhile, Lip is determined not to end up like his father when he forgets to meet Mandy and Katie after a night out, forcing him to make a huge commitment to them both. Elsewhere, Debbie uses a schoolboy crush to her advantage. Voice-over: Frank Gallagher Final Appearance: PC Tony

=== Series 4 (2007) ===
| No. overall | No. in series | Title | Directed by | Written by | Original release date | Viewers (millions) |
|---|---|---|---|---|---|---|
| 27 | 1 | "New Beginnings" | Paul Norton Walker | Emma Frost | 9 January 2007 | 4.00 |
It's Lip's 18th birthday and there are a few surprises in store for him and the rest of the Gallagher family. First, the Maguires move in next door in an attempt to drive a wedge between Mandy and Lip. And, second, mum Monica returns, claiming she is back for good and only Carl welcomes her back with open arms. Annoyed by her estranged mother's sudden return, Debbie calls upon Norma, Monica's lover, for help. Meanwhile, Sue, Kev, Veronica, and Marty plot to buy a Romanian baby. However, Kev and Veronica end up behind bars, while Marty becomes a fugitive. Elsewhere, Sheila is away on a cookery course, and Frank drunkenly burns down her kitchen and ends up in hospital. Once released, he is shocked by the changes that have occurred back on the estate and finds himself in a tricky situation when Monica makes it clear why she has returned. And Stan has a new sidekick - Irish youngster PC Tom O'Leary (Michael Legge). Voice-over: Debbie Gallagher First appearance: Mickey Maguire, PC Tom O'Leary Final appearance: Veronica Fisher, Kev Ball (until series 8), Marty Fisher (until series 8), Sue Garland
| 28 | 2 | "New Romances" | Paul Norton Walker | Emma Frost | 16 January 2007 | 3.75 |
Frank is desperate to keep the fact that he's still married to estranged wife Monica from Sheila, and Monica is not making it easy for him as she continues to sexually pursue him. But Sheila can see that she has competition for Frank and conspires with Debbie to reunite Monica and Norma. But is Monica still a lesbian, and will she give up her fight for Frank and her kids? Meanwhile, Jamie Maguire (Aaron McCusker) is released from prison after serving ten years for murder. Rejecting his family's offer of a "big job," Jamie is determined to stay on the straight and narrow, getting himself a job and a room at The Jockey. But he soon comes into conflict with Karen. And Stan Waterman (Warren Donnelly) and Tom investigate the theft of a racehorse, while Carol and Lillian launch a "Free Kev and Veronica" petition, with little success. Voice-over: Frank Gallagher First Appearance: Jamie Maguire
| 29 | 3 | "You Decide" | Paul Norton Walker | Stephen Russell | 23 January 2007 | 3.72 |
Monica has finally managed to seduce Frank, but he dare not tell Sheila that he and Monica have been sleeping together despite his promises to his wife. Sheila proves to be a frightening adversary when scorned, and Frank could be in danger. Neither Sheila nor Monica is willing to share him, so Frank must decide which wife he wants; the future of his family depends upon his decision. Meanwhile, tragedy strikes the Maguires when Jamie's past crimes lead to the brutal murder of one of his brothers, sending Paddy and Shane on the path of revenge against the family's rival. Can Jamie prevent a turf war? Elsewhere, there's a tough new PC on the beat in Chatsworth, Carrie Rogers (Amanda Ryan), and she takes an instant dislike to most of the residents. Voice-over: Sheila Jackson First appearance: PC Carrie Rogers Final appearance: Sheila Jackson
| 30 | 4 | "The Runaway" | Noreen Kershaw | Jack Thorne | 30 January 2007 | 3.01 |
Ian gets more than he bargained for when he gets involved with Anna, a girl on the run from Paddy. Offering to help Anna escape Chatsworth, Ian begins to develop feelings for her, and they end up in bed together. Lip, Mandy, and even Frank get caught in the crossfire when Paddy discovers his enemies lie close to home. As his plan proceeds, Ian is faced with a big decision: will he leave Chatsworth with his new love? Meanwhile, Kash looks set to throw away everything Yvonne has worked for, and when even she turns against him, he is forced to take drastic measures to bury his debts. Elsewhere, Mimi is convinced that she is cursed after another member of the Maguire family is murdered, while Jamie and Karen try to outdo each other in the fun run. Voice-over: Ian Gallagher Final appearance: Kash Karib (until series 6)
| 31 | 5 | "Boys, Boys, Boys" | David Threlfall | Story by : Jim O'Hanlon, Amanda Cole | 6 February 2007 | 3.27 |
After being kicked out of Sheila's by an estate agent, Frank is forced to move back in with his kids, and Debbie could not be happier to have her dad back home. Monica, however, is not happy with the attention Frank is giving his daughter and tells Debbie it's time she found a boyfriend, so Debbie starts dating a Catholic boy called Luke, only for Frank to ruin her new romance and, eventually, his close relationship with his daughter. Meanwhile, Jamie proposes to Karen, who immediately accepts. This causes tension within the Maguire family, especially with Mimi, who sets out to prove that Karen is nothing more than a tart. Bringing Karen along on a robbery job, Mimi lures her into a trap with a security man. But Karen finds an ally in another Maguire child. Elsewhere, Ian begins an affair with the most unlikely of people – the homophobic Mickey Maguire (Ciarán Griffiths). But the affair gets out of control when Mickey falls in love with Ian and risks revealing his sexuality to Paddy. Voice-over: Lip Gallagher
| 32 | 6 | "Dangerous Situation" | David Threlfall | Ed McCardie | 13 February 2007 | 3.03 |
It's Monica's birthday, and Carl is desperate to have his family back together; that means getting rid of Norma. However, he ends up striking an unlikely bond with his mother's lover. Meanwhile, Karen - pushed too far by a devious Mimi - ends her relationship with Jamie, leaving him heartbroken. Trying to make their son happy, Mimi and Paddy kidnap Karen and try to bully her into marrying Jamie. Elsewhere, Frank agrees to drive Shane's ice cream van (the Maguires use it as a cover for dealing, so now Frank has E's on tap!), but there's trouble brewing with an angry mob. Meanwhile, Kelly returns to Chatsworth, only to discover her brother has left the estate, forcing her to move in with Lillian. And Stan finds Carrie's future as a copper rests in his hands when her aggression gets out of control. Voice-over: Carl Gallagher Final appearance: Jez
| 33 | 7 | "Terrorist Target" | Noreen Kershaw | Emma Frost | 20 February 2007 | 3.36 |
Frank and Monica's marriage becomes strained, and Monica vents her anger by sleeping with Norma. Realising Norma is splashing the cash, Frank tries to steal her money. When Norma catches him, she makes an allegation of rape against him, and he ends up in court. Desperate to win Monica back, Norma offers to drop the charges... if Frank leaves Chatsworth and his family for good. Meanwhile, explosions create fears that Chatsworth is a terrorist target. Paddy is certain the Maguires are under attack, and fears yet another death within his family is just around the corner. His problems escalate when Mickey and Shane lose some Semtex meant for dangerous associates of his. Elsewhere, Yvonne starts up a call centre and recruits Lip and Lillian to help her. Lip finds himself attracted to one of the callers - a transvestite - while Tom takes drastic measures to stop Carrie from transferring to another station. Voice-over: Norma Starkey
| 34 | 8 | "Revelations" | Lawrence Till | Paul Abbott | 27 February 2007 | 2.87 |
Paddy is shaken when he learns of the deaths of his three former cellmates. To add to his worries, Jamie is about to marry Karen, and Mimi will stop at nothing to sabotage the day. Paddy sets out on a dangerous mission to finally confront his enemies, but he uncovers a web of lies, betrayal, and murder involving Jamie, his deceased son, Fergal, and his most trusted associates. Meanwhile, Norma has finally won Monica back, and the pair make plans to go travelling. Desperate not to lose his mother again, Carl tries to reunite Monica and Frank. Elsewhere, Yvonne's world comes crashing down when her house is repossessed due to Kash's debts, and Lip makes a shocking discovery about Mandy that tests their relationship. Voice-over: Paddy Maguire Final Appearance: Carol Fisher First Appearance: Chesney Karib, Meena Karib

=== Series 5 (2008) ===
| No. overall | No. in series | Title | Directed by | Written by | Original release date | Viewers (millions) |
|---|---|---|---|---|---|---|
| 35 | 1 | "The Countdown" | David Threlfall | Ed McCardie | 1 January 2008 | 3.25 |
Just another drunken night out turns into a nightmare for Frank when he mistakes an electrical generator for a urinal. At hospital, he's told that tests show he has a heart condition and may only have a few days left to live. As he endures on a drinking binge, he is haunted by his 12-year-old self, and desperately tries to find what legacy he will leave behind if he dies. Meanwhile, Lip returns from University. Mandy and the Gallaghers welcome him with open arms. But Lip's world is thrown into turmoil when a face from his past arrives, which forces Mandy to confront the fact that their relationship is not as indestructible as she thought. Elsewhere, newlyweds Karen and Jamie take over at The Jockey, while Lillian opens a brothel, which attracts the attention of Stan, Tom and Carrie. Voice-over: Frank Gallagher Final Appearance: Lip Gallagher (until series 11)
| 36 | 2 | "Other Paddy" | David Threlfall | Stephen Russell | 8 January 2008 | 2.83 |
Paddy Smith, who is Mimi's ex-boyfriend as well as Paddy's business rival, arrives in Chatsworth. He makes a comment about Mimi's weight, not knowing that she can hear. Mimi takes this personally and begins worrying that she is not good enough for Paddy, leaving Paddy living in Mickey's new limo. Can Mandy reunite her parents? Meanwhile, Carl is humiliated at school when he discovers Ian is dating his teacher. Elsewhere, Norma tries to make her dormobile more homely, but she regrets asking Shane for help when she is caught up in his antics with a snake. And Frank saves Paddy's life and uses it to get free drinks. Voice-over: Frank Gallagher
| 37 | 3 | "Happy Birthday, Ma Maguire" | Paul Norton Walker | Stephen Russell | 15 January 2008 | 2.85 |
When Monica starts getting visions of nursery rhyme characters, she knows what's going on: she's having another baby. But the Gallaghers, especially Frank, are not so pleased at the idea, prompting Monica to make an attempt at regaining her children's love by acting motherly, which leaves them pining for the old Monica. Meanwhile, The Jockey is robbed on the eve of Mimi's surprise birthday party. Jamie, Mickey, Ian, and Shane are under strict instructions from Paddy to find the furniture in time for the party without Mimi finding out. However, the future of the pub is put in jeopardy by the arrival of a brewery inspector. Elsewhere, Stan falls in love with a foreigner, but Carrie and Tom fear he is being conned. Voice-over: Monica Gallagher
| 38 | 4 | "Frank's Big Win" | Paul Norton Walker | Jack Lothian | 22 January 2008 | 2.66 |
When people think Frank's won the lottery, he's not about to say otherwise with endless free drinks coming his way. Debbie, however, knows the truth. But Frank is reluctant to listen, until his youngest son, Liam, is kidnapped. Eschewing the police, Frank turns to Paddy to save his son. To make matters worse, Monica begins using Norma's credit card, and Norma expects Frank to repay with his lottery winnings. Meanwhile, Jamie and Karen's marriage is strained when Jamie discovers Karen's long list of lovers, including Frank and The Jockey's delivery man. Will he be able to accept his wife's dodgy past, or is their marriage over before it's even begun? Elsewhere, Mickey gets himself and Ian arrested for stealing a bed, and he uses the situation to pursue his former lover again. Voice-over: Liam Gallagher
| 39 | 5 | "Beach Party" | Lawrence Till | Malcolm Campbell | 29 January 2008 | 2.81 |
With the local council allotting money to the new Young Mayor, Debbie sees a chance to save money for the whole estate. However, when Chesney Karib (Qasim Akhtar) wins, he turns Chatsworth into a beach, and he turns nasty when Debbie attempts to challenge him. Meanwhile, Shane falls in love with Kelly, unaware that she is now working at Lillian's, but it appears there's a genuine spark between the pair. Elsewhere, Stan accidentally runs over an old woman. He is then forced to confront his eyesight problems, which puts both his and Carrie's careers on the line. Voice-over: Debbie Gallagher
| 40 | 6 | "Nowhere To Go" | Lawrence Till | Ben Charles Edwards | 5 February 2008 | 2.50 |
When Katie mistakes a bag of ecstasy for sweets, Mandy orders the Gallaghers to throw Frank out of the house. Receiving no support from his family, Frank begins sleeping rough, and Liam, fearing he will have to take care of Monica's baby, joins his father, and the pair strike up a bond. Meanwhile, Mickey's on a mission to show his father that he is just as reliable as Jamie, but when he loses a bag of cocaine to a rival business, he and Ian face dangerous territory while trying to get it back. Elsewhere, Paddy makes his disapproval of Shane and Kelly's "romance" clear, and he pays her to leave Chatsworth, leaving Shane devastated. Voice-over: Ian Gallagher
| 41 | 7 | "Brothers and Boyfriends" | Fraser MacDonald | Stephen Russell | 12 February 2008 | 2.49 |
A gas leak at the Gallaghers brings sexy fireman Sean into Ian's life. But Ian's new romance unexpectedly reunites him with his biological father, Gary Bennet, and he is forced to uncover a sickening truth about the people he holds dear. Meanwhile, Frank is now a wheelchair user after another drunken mishap, and he uses the opportunity to get out of Monica's antenatal classes. But he finds himself being hunted down by Stan and Tom. And Carl begins a passionate affair with his girlfriend's mother, only for it to backfire when she leaves her husband. Voice-over: Lillian Tyler
| 42 | 8 | "I Love Frank" | Fraser MacDonald | Ed McCardie | 19 February 2008 | 2.91 |
On the bus to a restart course, Frank has the briefest of encounters with a beautiful stranger, Rosie. Within days, he finds himself falling in love and turning into a new man, but the stage is set for heartache when Norma discovers his affair. Meanwhile, Debbie invites two Americans to stay with the Gallaghers in order to raise money for a family holiday, but she clashes with Brandi, a religious beauty who is a hit with the men of Chatsworth. Liam discovers Brandi is not as innocent as she seems to be. Elsewhere, Lillian is placed in witness protection when an armed robber, whom she identified, goes on the run. Voice-over: Frank Gallagher
| 43 | 9 | "Absent Parents" | Jim Loach | Emma Frost | 26 February 2008 | 2.56 |
Monica has an unexpected visitor, her mother Joan (Anne Reid), who no one's seen for 20 years, and her arrival forces Monica to relive painful memories from her childhood, and the family are shocked to discover Joan has got Alzheimer's disease, while Frank attempts to hide a dark secret that he shares with his mother-in-law. Meanwhile, Mickey and Shane begin stealing cars to pay for a house party when Paddy and Mimi go on holiday, but Liam proves to be more successful than them, forcing them into a partnership with the youngster. Voice-over: Monica Gallagher
| 44 | 10 | "Old Friends, New Enemies" | Jim Loach | Jack Lothian | 4 March 2008 | 2.57 |
Jamie's ex-cellmate Mark comes to stay, but Karen doesn't trust him and orders Jamie to ask him to leave. however, Mark once saved Jamie for a savage beating in prison, and he uses the incident to force Jamie back into the life of crime - and away from Karen. Meanwhile, Paddy encourages Carl to take part in a boxing match. Determined to show people that he is not just a loser, Carl begins training for the match. But Paddy has an ulterior motive for asking Carl's help. And, Norma is depressed after seeing how loved up Frank and Monica have become, so she begins dating Yvonne's sister-in-law. Voice-over: Norma Starkey
| 45 | 11 | "Twin" | David Threlfall | Stephen Russell | 11 March 2008 | 2.36 |
When Paddy's caught on camera for an armed robbery, Mimi begs him to call his brother, Noel. But Paddy has a dark history with his sibling and would rather go to jail. Determined not to let the family fall apart, Mimi invites Noel to Chatsworth, hoping the estranged brothers will make peace. Meanwhile, Frank's latest bender has left the Gallaghers in debt to the Maguires, while Debbie and Liam set on a money-making spree, Ian steals from the Jockey, and when Karen and Jamie accuse the new member of staff, he takes revenge by setting the pub on fire after closing time. Has Ian's desperation cost the Maguires the pub? Voice-over: Mimi Maguire
| 46 | 12 | "Family at War" | Lawrence Till | Malcolm Campbell | 18 March 2008 | 2.36 |
When Stan gets caught in the crossfire between Yvonne and her kids, a full-blown row puts their relationship on the rocks. Things go from bad to worse when Yvonne, along with her children and Frank, find themselves held at gunpoint in the shop. Meanwhile, Carl decides to join the army, but a concerned Ian and Jamie recruit an ex-soldier to show Carl that it's not as adventurous as he thinks. And, Monica fears something will go wrong during the birth of her seventh child. Voice-over: Carl Gallagher
| 47 | 13 | "Date A Death" | Lawrence Till | Sarah Hooper | 25 March 2008 | 2.35 |
Mandy is persuaded into going on a blind date. It seems like she's struck gold, until her first night of sex and drugs turns into a living nightmare, not just for her, but for Jamie, Ian and Karen, as the foursome find themselves covering up a murder, but Frank may have discovered the truth. Meanwhile, Chesney is tired of Yvonne's strict nature and seeks solace at the Maguires', where he strikes up an unlikely friendship with Paddy and Mimi, but they end up putting his life in danger. And, Mickey organises a limo party. Voice-over: Mandy Maguire
| 48 | 14 | "The Ties That Blind Us" | David Threlfall | Ed McCardie | 1 April 2008 | 2.47 |
After Mandy gets arrested for suspected drug running, she forms the unlikeliest of friendships with Tom, who is attempting to track down his biological mother. but as Mandy makes her feelings clear, Tom begins charming another resident of Chatsworth - Debbie. Meanwhile, Mimi is accused of being too aggressive, so she adopts a more caring nature, but her softer side begins redeeming the local junkies, and driving away the Maguires' most frequent customers. And, Monica continues to keep Frank awake at night, and when he begins falling asleep at the pub, he decides to act against her. Voice-over: Liam Gallagher
| 49 | 15 | "Assault" | Paul Norton Walker | Ed McCardie | 8 April 2008 | 2.54 |
While enjoying another secret rendezvous, Debbie and Tom are forced to come to the aid of an assaulted woman. however, when Tom himself is put in the frame for her assault, the truth about his new romance spreads quickly, and while he tries to save his career, Debbie faces the backlash of the Gallagher family, but it's Frank who comes to her rescue and shows her that her family will love her, who-ever she is with. Will Debbie ignore Frank's words and dump Tom, because she thinks it will make her family like her again, or will she listen to his words and stay with Tom but also try to get along with her family. Meanwhile, Kelly returns to Chatsworth, revealing all about her and Paddy's deal, and when Shane attempts to stand up to his father, he ends up in hospital, ripping the Maguire family apart and forcing Mimi to take sides between her husband and her children. And, Mandy and Ian's quest for love takes a shocking turn when they find themselves in bed together. Voice-over: Mickey Maguire
| 50 | 16 | "The Ninth Time Around" | Paul Norton Walker | Stephen Russell | 15 April 2008 | 2.57 |
When Manchester experiences an earth tremor, Monica's waters break and she goes into labour. On the other side of Chatsworth, the same tremor knocks Frank off his bar stool and puts him in a coma, where he imagines himself as a big celebrity, with estranged son Ian as his agent. Can Frank recover in time to see the birth of his ninth child and will his relationship with Ian survive? Meanwhile, Carl uses Katie as bait to seduce a local girl. however, when Katie is kidnapped by her, a search gets underway, and Carl must face the backlash of the Maguires. And, Kelly discovers she is pregnant with Shane's child. Voice-over: Frank Gallagher First Appearance: Stella Gallagher

=== Series 6 (2009) ===
| No. overall | No. in series | Title | Directed by | Written by | Original release date |
|---|---|---|---|---|---|
| 51 | 1 | "Remember Me" | David Richardson | Ed McCardie | 27 January 2009 |
Ian is seriously assaulted and ends up in hospital. When he finally awakes, he discovers that he has amnesia. Not only can he not remember his friends and family, he seems to have forgotten about his sexuality and he suddenly begins questioning his life and future in Chatsworth, while Carl attempts to turn his brother straight. Meanwhile, Debbie turns 16 and the Gallaghers celebrate in the only way they know how, a party, but Debbie starts to wonder if Tom is the right man for her, forcing him to make a grand gesture. And, Frank and Monica are faced with an impossible challenge with their newborn baby, Stella. Voice-over: Stella Gallagher
| 52 | 2 | "Trouble in Paradise" | David Threlfall | Sarah Hooper | 3 February 2009 |
With the launch night of the newly redecorated Jockey looming, Jamie and Karen's marriage is strained, Karen is further infuriated when Jamie leaves most of the work down to her. events come to head at the relaunch when Karen resorts to stripping to get customers. Will a lesbian encounter and the discovery of a skeleton re-ignite things? Meanwhile, Mickey goes to college, where he befriends a teacher and her husband - two swingers. And, Carl's latest conquest, Maxine Donnelly (Joanna Higson), gets her feet well and truly under the table at the Gallaghers, and takes Debbie on a night out. Voice-over: Mickey Maguire First appearance: Maxine Donnelly and Joe Pritchard
| 53 | 3 | "All Rise" | David Richardson | Jimmy Dowdall | 10 February 2009 |
Frank falls victim to identity fraud and is horrified to discover his criminal record has been deleted, making him eligible for jury service. Once in court, he meets a like-minded juror who seems to have taken a shine to him Meanwhile, Mickey and Shane start up a touring company to scam tourists, but Carrie is onto them. Carrie tracks Mickey to a warehouse, where the pair strike up an unlikely bond, Mandy moves out of the Gallagher home to live with Jamie and Karen at The Jockey. Voice-over: Frank Gallagher Cameo Appearance: Happy Mondays lead singer Shaun Ryder
| 54 | 4 | "Loving Wife" | David Threlfall | Ed McCardie | 17 February 2009 |
Feeling unwanted by Frank, Monica decides to go and see a hypnotist who is performing at The Jockey in hope of re-igniting her and Frank's love life, but the result has the opposite effect when she ends up seducing the hypnotist. Meanwhile, Mandy goes to the next step in her relationship with Joe Pritchard (Ben Batt), with a little help from Karen, but a misunderstanding with Kelly leads to a painful experience for both Joe and Mandy, while Jamie tries to spice up his sex life. And, Carl discovers he has an STD and faces the task of tracking down all of his lovers. Voice-over: Monica Gallagher First appearance: Maureen
| 55 | 5 | "Miscarriage of Marriage" | Paul Norton Walker | Tom Higgins | 24 February 2009 |
Karen and Jamie's marriage is put under strain when Karen suffers a miscarriage, Things get even worse by the interference of the Maguires and a decision from Mimi that rocks Jamie and Karen for good. Meanwhile, Frank, Norma, Debbie and Monica accompany Liam on a trip to Blackpool when he wins a part in an advertisement for Child Abuse, and Frank accidentally lands himself a part in the advertisement. And, Tom takes his prank war with Stan too far, threatening both of their careers. Voice-over: Frank Gallagher
| 56 | 6 | "Breaking Point" | Paul Norton Walker | Jack Lothian | 3 March 2009 |
A DSS officer arrives at the Gallaghers, enquiring about benefits. When the officer discovers the extent of the Gallaghers' benefit fraud, Frank decides to corrupt him by using alcohol and drugs, but Monica takes a much personal approach, which widens the rift between her and Frank. Meanwhile, Carrie receives promotion and jumps at the chance to flee the estate, and when Tom's career completely falls apart, Stan is left heartbroken by the loss of his two friends, while Carl grows suspicious of Mickey's sexuality and sets a trap for him. And, Paddy wakes up tied to a bed, not knowing how he got there. At first, he thinks it's a dirty trick set by his new lover, but the truth is set to change his life forever. Voice-over: Paddy Maguire Final appearance: PCs Tom O'Leary and Carrie Rogers
| 57 | 7 | "Always Leave Them Wanting More" | Lawrence Till | Ian Kershaw | 10 March 2009 |
Ian returns to England, unaware that he is carrying a body in the boot of his car. Befriending the stowaway, he finds himself forced into caring for a deaf teenager, and he's in for a shock when he returns to Chatsworth. Meanwhile, Monica tries to save her marriage but as always, Frank's attentions are elsewhere, causing Monica to make a life-changing decision that nearly tears the Gallagher family apart. And, The Maguires throw a party at The Jockey for Paddy and Mimi's wedding anniversary, but Paddy is still missing. Voice-over: Monica Gallagher Final Appearance: Monica Gallagher (until series 8) First Appearance: Danny
| 58 | 8 | "Damaged" | Lawrence Till | Davey Jones | 17 March 2009 |
Following Monica's elope, the Gallaghers struggle to deal with the aftermath, but things could be improving for the better when Frank inherits a large house from his beloved Aunt Iris, Only if it was that simple. Meanwhile, Paddy returns to Chatsworth determined to conceal his heroin addiction from his family, but Mimi begins to think that he has cancer. And, Jamie and Karen's marriage hits rock bottom when they come to blows over the running of The Jockey. Voice-over: Mimi Maguire
| 59 | 9 | "The Darkest Hour" | Paul Norton Walker | Malcolm Campbell | 24 March 2009 |
After a few harsh words from Frank and with the departure of Monica, Norma begins to question her life and place within the Gallagher family, she decides to leave Chatsworth and returns to her old lorry driving job, where she is reunited with an old flame. Meanwhile, Shane comes out of his coma and is devastated when he discovers he has been paralysed. Kelly and Mimi continue to come to blows over his care, until Kelly delivers Mimi some home truths about the mess of her family. Is this the end of the Maguires' marriage? And, things heat up between Karen and Joe when she discovers he has been hitting Mandy. Voice-over: Shane Maguire
| 60 | 10 | "To The Future" | Paul Norton Walker | Tracy Brabin | 31 March 2009 |
The Gallaghers receive a letter from Liam's school saying that he has been shortlisted on a scheme for a fast track education. With Monica gone, Norma and Frank are forced to play a married couple to ensure a bright future for Liam, and Frank finds himself strangely attracted to his former love-rival. Meanwhile, Mimi vows to keep Paddy on the straight and narrow following the revelation of his addiction but the urge for heroin is too strong for Paddy to take. Elsewhere, Lillian's estranged son arrives in Chatsworth. But Kelly smells a rat, while Karen is wracked with guilt about sleeping with Joe, but that doesn't stop her succumbing to temptation again. Voice-over: Karen Maguire
| 61 | 11 | "Powerless" | David Threlfall | Emma Taylor | 7 April 2009 |
When Jamie learns of Joe's abuse towards Mandy, he sees red and beats Joe up in front of the crowded Jockey. Realising this could finish off her son, Mimi takes the blame for his actions and is sent to prison awaiting trial. When a new gang attempts to muscle in on Maguire turf, it falls on Jamie to take control of the family. Meanwhile, Frank wins The Jockey team's football match and saves Paddy from a heroin overdose. Elsewhere, the strain of running the Gallagher household has finally taken its toll on Debbie. Voice-over: Jamie Maguire
| 62 | 12 | "Cold Turkey" | David Threlfall | Tom Higgins & Kevin Erlis | 14 April 2009 |
Ian is angry to discover Liam has been bunking off school with Danny. Suspecting there is more to this than meets the eye. he, Mickey and Carl discover Danny is trying to track down his violent father, and the truth about his brother's death finally comes to the surface. Meanwhile. as Paddy goes cold turkey and Jamie tries to deal with the situation with Joe and Mimi, Mandy finds herself torn between love and family and confides in an unlikely source - Frank Gallagher. Elsewhere, Meena becomes a personal assistant to Lillian. Voice-over: Ian Gallagher Final Appearance: Danny
| 63 | 13 | "What About Me?" | Tony Slater Ling | Paul Tomalin | 21 April 2009 |
The Gallagher family is thrown into crisis by a surprise visit from social services, which causes Debbie to lash out at Frank, who seeks solace in drink – and a Polish security guard. Meanwhile, Chesney is seduced by a married woman and promptly falls in love with her, only to discover her real intentions are less straightforward than they seem, and the Maguires are infuriated when Mandy reunites with Joe, while Jamie and Karen reunite. Voice-over: Frank Gallagher
| 64 | 14 | "Haunted by the Past" | Tony Slater Ling | Tom Higgins | 28 April 2009 |
Yvonne is confronted by a ghost from her past – Kash, and resorts to desperate measures to keep a shocking secret from her children. Meanwhile, Frank tries to stay sober as the Gallaghers' set out to win back Liam and Stella, while Debbie resorts to her own drastic course of action. Elsewhere, Mimi is released from prison, but her marriage to Paddy is beyond repair. Return and Final Appearance of: Kash Karib Voice-over: Yvonne Karib
| 65 | 15 | "Confession" | Lawrence Till | Ed McCardie | 5 May 2009 |
After managing to upset everyone, Frank gets cast out for the night by Debbie and seeks shelter in a church confessional where, he overhears a neighbour's shocking story, Meanwhile, the marriage of Mimi and Paddy is beyond redemption, but the Maguires refuse to see divorce as an option, so they both hire the same hitman to kill one another. And, Mickey and Liam are devastated when Ian announces that he is leaving Chatsworth. Voice-over: Debbie Gallagher
| 66 | 16 | "It's Over" | Lawrence Till | Alex Ganley | 12 May 2009 |
Haunted by dreams of his kidnapper, Paddy resolves to banish his demons and regain control by tracking down Maureen, the woman responsible for what he has become. But Maureen's final act of revenge leaves the life of one of the Maguire siblings in grave danger. Meanwhile, Frank discovers his child benefit payments have stopped, and his quest to reclaim them lands him in a police cell. Elsewhere, Maxine comes up with a way to show Carl where his true feelings should lie, and Karen is left in turmoil when she discovers that she is pregnant. Voice-over: Paddy Maguire and Frank Gallagher Final Appearance: Debbie Gallagher, Mandy Maguire, Meena Karib, Norma Starkey and Maureen.

=== Series 7 (2010) ===
| No. overall | No. in series | Title | Directed by | Written by | Original release date |
|---|---|---|---|---|---|
| 67 | 1 | "Perfectly Frank" | David Threlfall | Tom Higgins | 26 January 2010 |
It's Frank's 50th, but he is no mood for celebrations, and instead opts to dwell in his own loveless existence until Libby Croker (Pauline McLynn), a local librarian falls into his life. His passion reignited, a whirlwind romance ensues - but will Libby's mother Patty Croker (Valerie Lilley), bibliophile activists and riot police stand in the way of Frank and his new love? Meanwhile, Nin Gallagher (Edna Doré), Frank's grandmother, tries to worm her way into the Gallagher household now that Debbie has gone, but Frank selfishly rejects her, infuriating Liam, Carl and Ian. Unable to cope with her disabled husband, Nin resorts to murderous measures. And, the Maguires eagerly await the arrival of Karen's baby, while Joe attempts to draw her into his web once more. Voice-over: Liam Gallagher First Appearance: Libby and Patty Croker
| 68 | 2 | "Gunshot" | David Threlfall | Emma Taylor | 2 February 2010 |
As the Maguires prepare for baby Connor's christening, Paddy's attempt to get involved in the family celebration is derailed by his own financial troubles. he tries to press-gang Shane and Jamie into his new plan for the family business, but they turn him down. Feeling ever more isolated, Paddy joins forces with the wrong people, and a fatal mistake has dire consequences for both him and his boys. Meanwhile, Karen is put under pressure by Mimi's takeover of the christening, and her affair with Joe spirals out of control. Voice-over: Paddy Maguire
| 69 | 3 | "Out of Control" | Lawrence Till | Sarah Hooper | 9 February 2010 |
Karen's obsession to prove herself to be more than just a mum has Jamie worried. After days of non-stop exercising, her body is in perfect shape but her mind is in danger of unravelling, leaving the Maguires to pick up the pieces. Frank thinks he knows what's going on - Karen is inheriting the illness of her mother, Sheila. Meanwhile, Maxine's world is turned upside down when she discovers that she is pregnant, but Carl follows in his father's footsteps at the Jockey, forcing Maxine, with the help of Ian, to make a shocking decision that changes the couple's future. Elsewhere, Yvonne is in debt to the Maguires, so she, Stan and Chesney concoct a plan to con Paddy and flee Chatsworth, while Joe schemes to take control of a Chatsworth business. Voice-over: Jamie Maguire Final Appearance: Yvonne Karib and Stan Waterman.
| 70 | 4 | "Toyboy" | Lawrence Till | Kevin Erlis | 16 February 2010 |
Mimi gets a toyboy, Billy the Jockey football team's star striker, but her happiness is short-lived when she discovers her new beau is the not the man she thought he was. So when Billy tries to blackmail Mimi into continuing their affair, she decides to teach him a Maguire life lesson he will never forget. Meanwhile, Shane encourages Paddy to get back into the dating game; only to have his proposal rejected. Shane rallies his brothers together on a night out for Paddy, but Paddy's 'Saturday Night Fever' dance routine causes his sons to abandon him. Humiliated, Paddy returns home and makes a shocking proposal to Kelly. And, the boozing finally has an effect on Frank when he is temporarily blinded, leading to an encounter with a transsexual. Voice-over: Mimi Maguire First Appearance: Billy Tutton
| 71 | 5 | "The Things You Do For Love" | Paul Walker | Jack Lothian | 23 February 2010 |
Maxine is desperate to make a good impression at her parents' party so cajoles Ian into pretending to be her boyfriend. But it is clear that there's a spark between them and to make matters worse, Carl begins to realise what he's lost by splitting up with Maxine so he is determined to win her back. But Carl soon finds love and hate are two sides of the same coin when Mickey reveals a painful secret, leading to a violent showdown. Meanwhile, Kelly takes control of the brothel while Lillian is away and is soon making a fortune from an untapped market, seeing her success, Paddy wants in on the action. And, Jamie is struggling with the thought of living with Karen's illness but a chance meeting with a woman named Michelle may be just what he needs. Voice-over: Mickey Maguire First Appearance: Bruce Donnelly and Michelle
| 72 | 6 | "From Chatsworth To Cuba" | Paul Walker | Frank Rickarby | 2 March 2010 |
Things are going from bad to worse for the Gallaghers when the bailiffs come calling, sending Liam off on a money-making spree which leads to some illicit gambling with Joe and a shocking confrontation with Frank, leading Liam to take drastic action to make a point. Meanwhile, The Maguires face a new conflict when Paddy announces that he's off with his new love interest D'Reen and that he's leaving them the family business but before he can, Mimi makes him guarantee the financial security for the family in the form of one last job. Voice-over: Paddy Maguire
| 73 | 7 | "Reunited" | Dominic Leclerc | Darren Fairhurst | 9 March 2010 |
Frank's love Libby returns and her time away has only increased the passionate flame that burns in her heart. Frank and Libby are reunited and all seems to be going well, but again, Libby's mother Patty threatens to drive a wedge between them. Meanwhile, Jamie focuses all his energies into giving his Madam, Michelle, whatever she wants in order to pay off Karen's debts, but when Michelle falls in love with him and Paddy discovers what his son is up to, the situation spirals beyond Jamie's control. And, Lillian invests in a new HD television to keep the punters happy, but soon realises she has purchased a conduit to the afterlife. Voice-over: Libby Croker Final Appearance: Michelle
| 74 | 8 | "Marry Me (Part 1 of 3)" | Dominic Leclerc | Ian Kershaw | 16 March 2010 |
Now that Libby and her mother are firmly nestled in the Gallagher house, Frank 'volunteers' to paint Patty's converted bedroom, but when Frank falls and injures himself while trying to steal paint, he and Patty both try to prove the other is feigning injury. Meanwhile, Shane asks Kelly to marry him but his dream turns to a nightmare when she confesses to her night with Paddy, tearing Shane's world apart and leaving Paddy fearing he has lost another child. And, Chesney holds a house party to get close to Sammy, but things soon begin spiralling out of control and a twisted turn of events ensure that Chesney and Carl's lives will never be the same again. Voice-over: Kelly Maguire Note: The episode begins with a parody of scenes from Trainspotting.
| 75 | 9 | "The Wild Wales (Part 2 of 3)" | David Threlfall | Jimmy Dowdall | 23 March 2010 |
Carl and Chesney's attempt to outrun their troubles make them realise the grass is not always greener. Stranded on a Welsh farm, they are offered sanctuary by a mysterious woman, Hazel. But things soon turn sour when news reaches them that they are now the prime suspects for Bonehead's murder, and the pair uncover a deadly secret that Hazel is so desperate to hide, while back in Chatsworth, Jimmy's reign of terror continues, and it's the Gallaghers who are caught in the crossfire. Meanwhile, Mickey and Liam have been picked by the council to make a local community film in the hope it will inspire the residents of Chatsworth now that their estate has been identified as the most run-down in Britain. With Kelly and Shane's help, Mickey decides to stretch poetic licence in pursuit of glory. Voice-over: Chesney Karib
| 76 | 10 | "Great Dangers (Part 3 of 3)" | David Threlfall | Davey Jones | 30 March 2010 |
The Gallaghers are all in grave danger when Jimmy discovers Carl and Chesney are back on the estate and vows to make them pay, while others choose to turn a blind eye, Shane refuses to stand by and do nothing, but when Jimmy and his gang go on the rampage across the estate, it seems even Paddy is powerless to stop them from taking over Chatsworth. Meanwhile, Shane is heartbroken to discover he is firing blanks. Desperate to be a dad, Shane considers adopting Mandy's daughter, Katie, and he also strikes up a bond with Liam and Stella. And, Libby's attempts to set up a book club backfire when she, with Frank's encouragement, becomes an unwitting modern-day Robin Hood. Voice-over: Shane Maguire
| 77 | 11 | "Fallen Heroes" | Lawrence Till | Phil Charles | 6 April 2010 |
Following the departure of Debbie and the sudden arrival of Libby and Patty into his life, A lonely Liam befriends a World War Two veteran to help him with a school project. he finds solace in the old man's company, while Frank chooses to take a hands-off approach to Liam's strange new friendship, Libby spies on them and jumps to all the wrong conclusions. Meanwhile, Maxine's brother comes to live with Ian and Mickey after a violent confrontation with his homophobic father, Maxine's dad follows his children to Chatsworth and befriends Frank. And, Karen is put out when Joe appears to have moved on by taking control of his life and attending anger management classes. Voice-over: Liam Gallagher
| 78 | 12 | "Boxer" | Lawrence Till | Malcolm Campbell | 13 April 2010 |
When the boxing club is threatened with closure, Ian, Carl and Chesney set about trying to save Jock from the hands of Paddy Maguire, but Ian soon discovers there is more to the feud than money, and he faces both personal and financial trouble while trying to fix the situation. Meanwhile, Libby is desperate to have a child before it's too late, but with Frank dragging his heels, she continues to try to be a good mother to Liam and Stella. And, Mickey begins training to be a fireman, but Paddy's years of belittling him come to the surface. Can Mickey pass his tests and finally stand up to his father? Voice-over: Mickey Maguire
| 79 | 13 | "Keep It in the Family" | Paul Walker | Tom Higgins | 20 April 2010 |
Kelly takes in her teenage sister Tonya, who needs help to get her baby out of care. In a meeting with Tonya's social worker, it's agreed that custody will only be considered if Tonya proves she is responsible by looking after a simulation baby. but when she elopes, Mickey discovers a sickening secret concerning Kelly, Tonya and their estranged father, and he is forced to make a painful decision about a child's future. Meanwhile, Libby persuades Frank to accompany Patty on a pilgrimage to France in the hopes of a miracle. The unlikely travelling companions end up sharing a room in a convent, where Frank becomes the improbable focus of attention. Voice-over: Patty Croker
| 80 | 14 | "Secret Relations" | Paul Walker | Sarah Hooper | 27 April 2010 |
Paddy and Mimi finally decide to get a divorce, but they get a nasty shock when it's revealed their marriage was never legal. Mimi hatches a plan to secretly marry and divorce legitimately in order to save the souls of their children who were born out of wedlock. Everything is in disarray, and Paddy is due to leave for a new business venture, but the mission to re-marry brings up memories of the past and unearths their true feelings. Meanwhile, Patty sets Frank up on a benefit scam, landing him behind bars. But when Libby learns the truth, she rails against a righteous Patty in order to raise bail and free her love, while Frank shares a cell with a physcotic murderer. And, Mickey is depressed about the changes in his family, but his mood changes when his begins dating Gary, an architect, only to discover their relationship is based on lies, and his own lies to his family look set to be uncovered. Voice-over: Mimi Maguire Final Appearance: Paddy Maguire
| 81 | 15 | "The End of The Affair" | Metin Huseyin | Ian Kershaw | 4 May 2010 |
When his father dies, Joe realises that life is too short, and the tragic news fuels his determination to start a new life with Karen. Although Karen is uncertain, Joe manages to convinces her of their future together away from Chatsworth. Trying to come clean to Jamie, Karen's confession is derailed when he reveals his own grubby secrets. Emotional deadlock forces Joe into a course of action with far-reaching consequences for all of them. Meanwhile, Bruce gets a chance to shine as manager for the Jockey football team, but when he arranges a gay five-a-side football tournament, Chesney's homophobic issues come to the surface, while Ian struggles to resist temptation with another man. And, Maxine explores her artistic side as a life model, but she soon finds herself fending off the advances of her former teacher. Voice-over: Joe Pritchard
| 82 | 16 | "Gang Wars" | Metin Huseyin | Tom Higgins | 11 May 2010 |
Joe sets a plan in motion to take Karen away from Chatsworth, enlisting the help of Maguire archnemesis Roscoe. With Paddy out of the picture, Roscoe sets about getting revenge for the Maguires getting one over him and takes everyone hostage in the Jockey, leaving Mickey, Bruce and Frank as the resident's only hope. Meanwhile, Maxine and Ian are mugged, and they viciously fight back, taking their attacker captive. At odds on what to do with their prisoner, the couple quickly realise their relationship is falling apart. Voice-over: Ian Gallagher Final Appearance: Ian Gallagher, Maxine Donnelly, Bruce Donnelly and Joe Prichard

=== Series 8 (2011) ===
| No. overall | No. in series | Title | Directed by | Written by | Original release date |
|---|---|---|---|---|---|
| 83 | 1 | "The Night Before (Part 1 of 5)" | Dominic LeClerc | Tom Higgins | 10 January 2011 |
Libby and Frank are supposed to be getting married, but this is put on hold when Frank disappears on his stag night. In his absence, a face from the past reclaims her place at the Gallagher household - Monica is back. But could she have had some involvement in Frank's disappearance? Meanwhile, Avril Powell (Karen Bryson), her husband Jackson (Emmanuel Ighodaro) and their daughter Letitia (Kira Martin) have settled into the community. Eager to make friends with the locals, Avril throws Libby a hen party in order to raise her spirits, and the Powells are not the only new additions to Chatsworth – unluckily for Chesney. Elsewhere, Karen has returned to Chatsworth, determined to save her marriage, while Mimi is on a mission to track down the father of her newborn baby, Cilla. Monica lies and says that Debbie had died while she was in the army, but she had not Monica wanted an excuse to come back to her family. Voice-over: Frank Gallagher First Appearance: Jackson Powell, Avril Powell, Letitia Powell and Sita Desai Return of: Monica Gallagher.
| 84 | 2 | "Missing (Part 2 of 5)" | Dominic LeClerc | Ian Kershaw | 11 January 2011 |
Frank is still missing and imagines that he is in a parallel universe featuring Doctor Who characters. His ex-wife Monica, having heard that Frank has gone, wants custody of Stella and Liam. Can Libby and Carl find Frank before the Gallagher family falls apart? Meanwhile, Mimi is recovering in hospital following her collapse, and promotes Shane as the head of the family in her absence, instigating a deadly feud between Shane and Jamie for headship of the family business. But when Shane finds himself in grave danger, Will Jamie save his brother or ensure that he is taught a lesson he will never forget? Elsewhere, A feud between Patty and the Powells gets out of control when it threatens to leave the Powells homeless. Voice-over: Jamie Maguire Final Appearance: Liam Gallagher
| 85 | 3 | "Where's Frank? (Part 3 of 5)" | Lawrence Till | Kevin Erlis | 12 January 2011 |
When the local school fails its Ofsted report, Shane discovers a new venture for the Maguires - school security, and he develops a close bond with a young boy who is being bullied. Meanwhile, Mickey fears his secret will finally be revealed when his gay pen pal is released from prison and comes to stay at the Maguires'. And, Libby decides to move on with her life after watching grim footage of Frank at his stag night, while Avril's kindness towards Mimi leaves her convinced that Avril is a lesbian. Voice-over: Mickey and Shane Maguire
| 86 | 4 | "Back Home (Part 4 of 5)" | Metin Huseyin | Ed McCardie | 13 January 2011 |
After returning to the Jockey, Karen attends the psychiatric hospital as an out-patient and finds that Frank has been there all along. Can he break free and save his relationship with Libby? Meanwhile, Sita is devastated when she fails her exams, and discovers her tutor will pass her if she sleeps with him. Determined to pass her exam, Sita turns to Carl for help. Elsewhere, Aidan Croker (Robbie Conway), Patty's great nephew, arrives on Chatsworth following his mother's imprisonment, and he proves more than a match for various Chatsworth residents. Voice-over: Karen Maguire First Appearance: Aidan Croker
| 87 | 5 | "Wedding of Disaster (Part 5 of 5)" | Lawrence Till | Ed McCardie | 14 January 2011 |
When Monica announces her divorce with Frank will be nullified unless he objects, Libby desperately tries to get Frank out of hospital so that they can marry and save the Gallagher family home. In hospital, Frank stages a breakout and finally discovers what happened to him on his stag night. Back in Chatsworth, the residents come together to organise a wedding, but time is running out. Meanwhile, Jamie is still struggling to accept Karen back into their marital bed, and refuses to allow her to help in Frank and Libby's wedding arrangements. Voice-over: Frank Gallagher Final Appearance: Monica Gallagher (until series 11)
| 88 | 6 | "Gangster Gallagher" | Metin Huseyin | Darren Fairhurst | 18 January 2011 |
It's Carl's 21st birthday, and Frank, Libby and the Maguires are planning a surprise party for him. Carl gets a job working for Jamie. However, his first job does not go to plan when Kelly steals money which was supposed to go to a business client. The business client in question is a ruthless psychopath. Left alone with him, Carl faces the most darkest experience of his life, and his problems have only just begun when Jamie accuses him of trying to steal from the family. Meanwhile, one of Joe's money-making schemes comes back to haunt Chesney, leaving him and Sita in debt. Mickey encourages Chesney to set up a gay hotline. Chesney is reluctant, but Mickey is left wondering what he has started when Chesney becomes addicted to the hotline. Voice-over: Carl Gallagher
| 89 | 7 | "Kidnap and Ransom" | Paul Norton Walker | Jimmy Dowdall | 25 January 2011 |
Shane and Kelly's new business of giving people their sexual fantasy threatens the Maguire family business when their client, Sandra, is reported missing by her husband. As the police swarm Chatsworth searching for her "Kidnappers", Shane calls upon the residents to help him, but Jamie is determined to make Shane see that he is not fit to run the business, even if it means sending his brother to prison. Meanwhile, Sita is annoyed to discover Chesney's new Muslim driving school scheme is a ruse for wild parties at the shop, and fearful that Chesney is losing everything the Karibs have worked for, Sita calls the terrorist line, but her actions result in a robbery at the shop, leaving the Karibs penniless. And, Patty, Mimi and Lillian go to battle over a bingo win, while Jackson becomes an unlikely drinking buddy for Frank. Voice-over: Chesney Karib
| 90 | 8 | "Together in Heaven" | Paul Norton Walker | Phil Charles | 1 February 2011 |
Struggling to work for the family and care for baby Cilla, Mickey comes up with a new way of making money: a fake website capturing credit card details of unsavoury users of other illegal websites. In a very Shameless take on the Robin Hood notion of robbing the rich to give to the poor, Mickey and Aidan take from the really bad guys and give to those much more deserving - themselves! But it's not long before the police are alerted, and the family face ruin. Meanwhile, Patty falls in love with suicidal Trevor and the pair get married. But tragedy strikes when her new husband comes up with a chilling plan, while her mother's romance leaves Libby fearing that Frank no longer wants to marry her. And, Sita is being harassed by a schoolboy. Voice-over: Mickey Maguire
| 91 | 9 | "Maguire Meltdown" | Andy McDonnell | Frank Rickarby | 8 February 2011 |
After sleepless nights with Cilla, Mimi is starting to feel bad and believes that she is going mad, as one of her relatives did, and that the house is haunted. Finally she believes that Kelly and Shane are trying to kill her and locks them out of the house though she recovers after seeing a vision of Mandy, who tells her what to do. Kelly is suspicious of the power new girl Bonnie exerts over Lillian in the brothel, and Avril and Jackson's continuing efforts to spice up their sex life leads daughter Letitia to believe that her father is having an affair. Voice-over: Kelly Maguire
| 92 | 10 | "Sickness and Health" | Laurence Till | Tom Higgins | 15 February 2011 |
Mickey needs somebody to love. He adopts a cat with FIDS (feline AIDS) and meets Philip who also suffers with AIDS in order to learn more about it. Mickey goes to the shop and returns to find Philip dead. He is also upset to learn that Shane has killed the cat and dumped it in the bin. Voice-over: Mickey Maguire
| 93 | 11 | "Takeover" | Lawrence Till | Ian Kershaw | 22 February 2011 |
Libby gets her mother a nurse to look after her when she's at work, all doesn't go to plan when Libby's mother is mistreated. Lillian reveals that she has signed over the house to her newly adopted daughter, Bonnie. Bonnie tells Lillian about her life growing up and then commits suicide. Voice-over: Lillian Tyler Final Appearance: Sita Desai
| 94 | 12 | "Sibling Rivalry" | Paul Norton Walker | Darren Fairhurst | 1 March 2011 |
Mimi's transsexual sister turns up, but is not all she appears to be. The Maguires are still at each other's throats, and Chesney is in danger as he and Jackson join the British Alliance Party, and manage to rub them up the wrong way. Voice-over: Mimi Maguire
| 95 | 13 | "Beginnings and Ends" | Paul Norton Walker | Kevin Erlis | 8 March 2011 |
Following his sexual encounter with Letitia's headmistress, Miss Heller, Frank has had his final chance with Libby, who seems taken with the mysterious Martin. Shane's theft of Tilly Pucker's wheelchair further strains relations between the Maguire brothers, coming to a head in a showdown with Tilly's minders. Voice-over: Frank Gallagher & Libby Croker Final Appearance: Libby Croker
| 96 | 14 | "The Not-So Deceased" | Michael Keillor | Jimmy Dowdall | 30 August 2011 |
It's a black day on Chatsworth when Paddy Maguire is returned in a coffin. While the residents grieve, Jamie gathers the Maguires to lift the lid on this 'special delivery'. Leticia dares Aiden to break in and take a photo of Paddy, but they're in for quite a surprise. Meanwhile, Karen sets up a kids' entertainment business, but the joke's on her when Mickey, Avril and Lillian join the team. Competition is fierce, but when a catfight with a sexy rival is popular with the dads, Karen discovers a new way to make some extra cash behind Jamie's back. Little does she know the danger she will face. Frank's war with Patty is re-ignited after Libby's departure, and he makes a shocking discovery that leaves Patty at his mercy. Voice-over: Patty Croker
| 97 | 15 | "My Name Is Avril" | Michael Keillor | Ian Kershaw | 6 September 2011 |
People start to wonder how Avril is able to afford lavish watches, and other gifts with a job that no one knows about. Jackson becomes suspicious of his household. Finding herself emotionally and sexually unfulfilled with the absence of Paddy, Mimi begins to fancy a new man who's hard to catch up with in more ways than one. Chesney, who saved his business, realizes that "something" else may need saving. Voice-over: Avril Powell
| 98 | 16 | "Frank Gallagher: Sent By God" | Sarah Punshon | Tom Higgins & Lee Warburton | 13 September 2011 |
While cleaning the windows, Jackson spots Letitia kissing Dee Davies in her bedroom. Jackson goes berserk. One night, he storms round to Dee's house to find Letitia. however, he is unexpectedly reunited with an old flame, and a shocking truth dawns on him - Dee is his son. Meanwhile, Frank staggers off to the Jockey, leaving Carl to nurse pox-ridden Stella. Pissed-up Frank leaves the pub and accidentally gets on a minibus, waking up in a synagogue. He's discovered by Isaac, who thinks he has been sent by god. Back at home, Stella takes a turn for the worse. Karen is on a mission to regain control at The Jockey. Voice-over: Jackson Powell
| 99 | 17 | "Comebacks" | Paul Unwin | Tom Higgins | 20 September 2011 |
A new gang has rolled into Chatsworth with an unlikely mission – to save the souls of the community. Jesus O'Toole leads the group and seems to know too much about certain residents. Aidan is certainly open to the possibilities that religion might bring, but love soon turns to hate when local businesses are picketed. An explosion on the Maguire's turf sees the family prepare for revenge. Kelly is attacked by a familiar face - Marty Fisher, who is on the run. And, Patty returns, missing Libby, she turns to the only person who might know of her whereabouts – Frank. Voice-over: Kelly Maguire Return of: Marty Fisher
| 100 | 18 | "Frank in the Frame" | Gordon Anderson | Paul Abbott | 27 September 2011 |
There's uproar in The Jockey when Frank pockets Cynthia's scratch card. And when Cynthia is assaulted, Frank becomes the prime suspect. Carl kicks off against the accusers, but Kelly shows Carl CCTV footage of Frank near the crime scene. Frank remembers nothing but scratch marks on his chest tell a different story. While Frank hands himself in, a distressed Carl seeks to prove his dad's innocence and phones Kev Ball, who returns to the Chatsworth like a knight in shining armour. New video footage jogs Frank's memory, but puts him in a stickier situation. Can a deal be made with gangster Growbag McCready? Frank's fate rests in his hands. Meanwhile, Mickey moves into the Jockey after a disagreement with Mimi, and Marty's presence continues to cause trouble between Shane and Kelly. Voice-over: Carl Gallagher Return and Final appearance of: Kev Ball (until series 11)
| 101 | 19 | "Moving Back" | Paul Unwin | Kevin Erlis | 4 October 2011 |
Aidan's bad behaviour has landed him in court, but it's Patty who'll decide the outcome. Feeling unwelcome at the Gallaghers, Aiden leaves Chatsworth to find his mother, recently released from prison. Mimi is unexpectedly reunited with Billy Tutton, Cilla's father, and his return to Chatsworth causes tension between Mimi and her children. Frank takes in a Polish man as a lodger. Marty and Mickey become flatmates, and both men reveal their secrets to each other. Voice-over: Aidan Croker Return of: Billy Tutton
| 102 | 20 | "Career Criminal" | Gordon Anderson | Tom Higgins | 11 October 2011 |
Desperate for money, Marty turns to crime and makes the mistake of stealing from the Maguires. Shane investigates Marty's sudden return to the estate and is horrified at what he discovers, while Kelly continues to battle her feelings for both men. Billy's plan to impress Mimi backfires. Voice-over: Kelly Maguire
| 103 | 21 | "The Maguire Motto" | Lawrence Till | Ian Kershaw | 18 October 2011 |
Mickey channels his' inner drama queen' at the community service with a difference. Ray's skill with numbers does not go unnoticed by Mickey, and a trip to the casino seems on the cards. But Ray's only got one thing on his mind, and it's not the jackpot! The community service cast are unhappy with their leader, Michelle and the play. So when Michelle has a timely accident and the centre is shut, Mickey takes the lead, bringing Christmas to Chatsworth early. Meanwhile, Mimi might wear the trousers in the family, but it's time Billy pulled his weight, so Mimi sets a profitable challenge to test his manhood. Voice-over: Mickey Maguire
| 104 | 22 | "PC Gallagher" | Lawrence Till | Jimmy Dowdall | 25 October 2011 |
Carl witnesses a crime but walks past, unaware of the consequences. Policeman Simon finds Carl and begs for help. No Gallagher helps the filth, but Simon's grim fate changes Carl. Turning down jobs from Jamie, workouts and exams, Carl's hiding something big. Will Aidan tell Frank what he finds? Meanwhile, the game is up for Billy and Mimi when Mickey catches them in a compromising position. And while Mimi is over the moon, Billy is bricking it as the Maguire brothers want his blood for daring to marry their mum, and Kelly must make the biggest decision of her life. Voice-over: Carl Gallagher

=== Series 9 (2012) ===
| No. overall | No. in series | Title | Directed by | Written by | Original release date |
|---|---|---|---|---|---|
| 105 | 1 | "The End of an Era (Part 1 of 2)" | John Henderson | Ed McCardie & Kevin Erlis | 9 January 2012 |
Chatsworth is in a time of darkest austerity. The Gallaghers and half the estate are evicted as part of Operation New Start - a multi-agency crackdown on the benefits culture of those in social housing, led by the ruthless Carmen Kenaway (played by Morwenna Banks) and Her not-very-good sidekick Daniella Feeney (played by Judy Flynn). Jamie and Karen find themselves housing the entire estate, and the community turn against Frank when he drunkenly gives Kenaway information that results in more evictions. However, Frank has his own pile of problems: Carl is in police training and to top it all off, a routine check-up at the clinic makes him realise that he is not as indestructible as he thought. Meanwhile, Jackson finally becomes a teacher, and reels in the fact that he and his family can finally escape Chatsworth life. However, Avril and Letitia have settled into the community, threatening both Jackson's marriage and career. Elsewhere, a heavily pregnant Kelly orders Marty to evict Mickey from their flat, only to have it backfire drastically when they all end up on the streets. Voice-over: Frank Gallagher
| 106 | 2 | "Save Chatsworth (Part 2 of 2)" | Luke Watson | Tom Higgins & Ed McCardie | 10 January 2012 |
Carl arrives back on the Chatsworth as a qualified policeman, but he receives hostility from Frank and a surprise welcoming from Jamie. But Carl is determined not to go ahead with the training until he receives his father's blessing. Meanwhile, Jackson is fingered for falsely claiming benefits, resulting in the withdrawal of his teaching job, and his marriage is thrown into chaos. he joins forces with the Maguires to save the estate, hoping it will save his marriage, while Frank is forced to become a double agent to gather information on Kenaway's next move, but Kenaway is one step ahead and riots begin to occur. Can they prevent the council from destroying Chatsworth forever? Elsewhere, Kelly visits a client in the hospital and runs into his wife, sparking off a heartbreaking chain of events that will change her life forever, while a confused Gloria Meak (Angeline Ball) tries to remember who took advantage of her the night before. Voice-over: Kelly Maguire First appearance: Gloria Meak
| 107 | 3 | "Open to All" | Andy McDonnell | Ed McCardie | 17 January 2012 |
Mimi worries that she cannot be everything that Billy needs and proposes an open marriage, which he reluctantly accepts. However, their arrangement soon causes chaos when Shane is assigned with the task of finding his stepfather a younger woman and Billy becomes convinced that Mimi is sleeping with Jackson. Meanwhile, Kelly seems to be spiraling out of control following her miscarriage, which leaves Marty and Lillian concerned for her state of mind. And, Patty finds herself in a tricky situation when she attends the funeral of an old friend. Voice-over: Mimi Tutton Note: This episode does not feature Frank Gallagher, being the first of two Shameless episodes not to feature any of the main Gallagher family and the first of three episodes to not feature Frank.
| 108 | 4 | "Vendetta" | Luke Watson | Jonathan Harvey & Ed McCardie | 24 January 2012 |
During a lads' night out, Mickey is the victim of a homophobic attack, leaving him mentally and physically scarred. Carl tries to persuade Mickey to let him track down his attacker and bring him to justice. When Mickey discovers his attackers' whereabouts, he goes looking for his own form of justice. Meanwhile, Ruby Hepburn (Kari Corbett), Mimi's niece, arrives on Chatsworth, and she is an immediate hit with the men of Chatsworth – even amongst her own family. And, Aidan falls into the wrong crowd when he befriends a local psychotic thug Fraiser Kane, but a practical joke turns sickening when a schoolteacher attempts to rehabilitate Fraiser. Voice-over: Mickey Maguire First Appearance: Ruby Hepburn
| 109 | 5 | "Cop Killer" | Andy McDonnell | Jimmy McDowall | 31 January 2012 |
A face from Jamie's past arrives in Chatsworth. DS Brooks, suspended on serious charges, needs Jamie's help. But Jamie is unable to do what DS Brooks has asked him to do. However, Brooks holds incriminating evidence that could destroy the Maguire family, and Jamie finds himself hired as Brooks' hitman. Meanwhile, Aidan is traumatised after watching Fraiser Kane sexually assault a teacher, and it seems Fraiser has set his sights on Letitia. Can Aidan overcome his guilt and ensure that Fraiser gets his comeuppance? Elsewhere, a routine debt collection changes Mickey's life forever when he becomes trapped in a room with a heavily pregnant junkie who goes into labour. Voice-over: Jamie Maguire Final Appearance: Mickey Maguire Note::Frank Gallagher does not appear making this the second episode not to feature the main character although Carl Gallagher does appear for a penultimate chapter.
| 110 | 6 | "Last Man Standing" | Tim Whitby | Mark Brotherhood | 7 February 2012 |
Desperate for cash, Jackson agrees to help Shane on a robbery job at a supermarket. however, the unlikely pair barely escape the security guards, and Jackson comes up with a scheme that may end poverty in Chatsworth altogether. Meanwhile, Gloria's brother Dominic (Stephen Lord), a whisky priest, causes mayhem on the estate when he pushes his luck with two married women. Elsewhere, Frank is lonely after Carl moves out, and while taking Stella for a birthday treat, he finds an ally in the most unlikely place. Elsewhere, Chesney and Carl's girlfriend Clem go for a picnic. Voice-over: Shane Maguire First Appearance: Dominic Meak Final Appearance: Carl Gallagher (until series 11)
| 111 | 7 | "All Fall Down" | Tim Whitby | Karen Laws & Ed McCardie | 14 February 2012 |
Things are getting worse for Kelly and Marty. While Marty's grief for his lost children reaches breaking point, Kelly appears to be punishing herself for her recent miscarriage, and when her friends attempt to help, Kelly disowns everyone she knows and leaves Chatsworth, where her life begins unravelling. Meanwhile, Avril finds herself out of her depth when she attempts to help a troubled colleague at the hospital. Elsewhere, Dominic makes a bet with Karen that he can lure Ruby into bed, and if he does, he gets to sleep with Karen too. Is Karen about to revert to her old, cheating, ways? Voice-over: Kelly Maguire
| 112 | 8 | "Blackout" | David Threlfall | Ed McCardie | 21 February 2012 |
Times are hard for the Gallaghers, and Marty's attempts to save money plunges the whole estate into darkness. the women gather at the Maguires, and shocking secrets are revealed, while Jamie agrees to hold a lock in for the men at the Jockey. Frank loses something very precious and gains a new friend. Elsewhere, Chesney's desperation to protect his shop from lawlessness leads to tragedy, and Avril and Marty find themselves in a police cell together. Voice-over: Gloria Meak
| 113 | 9 | "Decision Time" | Paul Cotter | Tom Higgins | 28 February 2012 |
Chesney arrives home from hospital to find his cousin Toof waiting for him, who has been sent their grandfather to negotiate Chesney's future in Chatsworth. Lillian holds auditions for new staff at the brothel. Ruby makes an enemy out of Kelly. Jamie is in turmoil after sleeping with Gloria, until he ends up in bed with her again. Voice-over: Chesney Karib
| 114 | 10 | "Million Dollar Maguire (Part 1 of 2)" | Justin Molotnikov | Jonathan Harvey & Ed McCardie | 6 March 2012 |
After a conversation with Frank, Jamie and Shane engineer a plan to raid Manchester's former War Rooms, now owned by the Lottery, with the aim of lifting a stash of scratch cards as a way to make some easy money. Frank is recruited along with Aidan, while Ruby persuades Shane to take her along. And although the heist starts off well, tensions quickly surface between the gang down in the crumbling network of tunnels, and Frank's cowardice leads to catastrophe. Karen is determined to prove to Mimi that she can run the Maguire business in Jamie's absence, and Letitia joins a girl gang. Voice-over: Jamie Maguire
| 115 | 11 | "Rescue Me (Part 2 of 2)" | Justin Molotnikov | Ed McCardie | 13 March 2012 |
Trapped underground, the pressure mounts for the five. Frank's life flashes before his eyes, with a particular event that occurred 35 years ago. Jamie knows his freedom could mean the end of his marriage, Ruby wants to be accepted as a Maguire, while Aidan is sick of being treated like the idiot child. Back in Chatsworth, Karen searches for clues, while Gloria wrestles with her guilt over Jamie. Shane's plans discovered, a search party is swiftly formed, but time is not on their side and decisions have to be made whether to involve the authorities for help. Voice-over: Frank Gallagher

=== Series 10 (2012) ===
| No. overall | No. in series | Title | Directed by | Written by | Original release date |
|---|---|---|---|---|---|
| 116 | 1 | "The Working Man" | David Threlfall | Jimmy Dowdall | 12 September 2012 |
Frank's workshy past comes back to haunt him when he is hounded by the Department of Work and Pension. Faced with losing his benefits, Frank finds himself doing something he's never done - entering the world of employment. Meanwhile, Shane and Jackson launch a new enterprise of bootleg booze, but it's rank and nobody is buying their stuff. Billy offers to help and concocts a brew using his extraordinary sense of smell and amazingly, it's a great success, but Shane soon grows jealous of Billy's success. And, Avril supplies pills to Patty, who wants more than her recommended dosage, but when Avril turns down her request, Patty springs into action with a plan to steal them, and Aidan, fearful she is turning into an addict, resorts to drastic measures. Voice-over: Frank Gallagher
| 117 | 2 | "The World of Burger" | Tim Whitby | Ian Kershaw | 13 September 2012 |
Frank loves his new job at World of Burgers. His banter and laid-back approach wins the respect of the team and sales figures increase. But his new boss, Wesley, is not happy and hatches a plan to get Frank fired. However, the plan backfires when Frank replaces him as manager. Frank soon longs for his old job when he is faced with an armed robbery and a staff walkout. Meanwhile, Karen and Mimi test out a new parenting method, but the result leaves Mimi questioning if she is a good mother to Cilla. And, Kelly attempts to bond with Aidan after overhearing him make a hurtful comment about prostitutes, but Aidan begins growing feelings for her. Voice-over: Mimi Tutton
| 118 | 3 | "The Brazilian Effect" | Gordon Anderson | Mark Brotherhood | 19 September 2012 |
Marty befriends a Brazilian housemaid and becomes determined to rescue her from a life of slavery, and he resorts to stealing from Lillian to buy her. However, she mistakes this grand gesture and becomes a maid for the Gallaghers, and Frank decides to use her good nature to his advantage at the World of Burgers. Meanwhile, Dominic has a surprise visitor: his and Gloria's mother, Hazel, who gave Gloria up for adoption but kept Dominic. Dominic tries to make peace between his mother and sister, but their relationship is beyond repair. Hazel makes it clear that she has no love for her daughters, and attempts to lure Dominic away from Chatsworth. And, Billy is tired of being treated as a pushover, and confides in Karen, who is convinced his problems could be resolved with a self-help tape. Voice-over: Marty Fisher
| 119 | 4 | "Who's The Mummy?" | Gordon Anderson | Ed McCardie & Tom Higgins | 25 September 2012 |
When Billy finds a pregnancy test, he fears Mimi is having another baby and confides in Jamie. However, Jamie is rattled when he discovers Gloria and Karen spent the night drinking at the Maguire household, and either of them could be expecting his baby. Gloria is faced with an even bigger problem when she is left debt-ridden by a loan company. A worried Dominic attempts to help by taking part in a boxing match to raise the money, but the problem escalates further out of control. Meanwhile, Jackson is suspicious because Avril and her new friend Callum are always together after hours, but when he sneers at an invitation to go clubbing, Avril leaves him behind and makes it a night to remember. And, Aidan and Chesney collect meat for a raffle and manage to get stuck with a live cow, while Shane tries make amends for his shocking crime by protecting the family of the man he killed. Voice-over: Gloria Meak
| 120 | 5 | "The Truth Will Out" | Andy McDonnell | Ed McCardie & Ben Newman | 3 October 2012 |
Shane is consumed with guilt after the hit-and-run and desperately tries to make amends for his actions by befriending Ruth, the wife of the victim. Ruth welcomes him into her life and family, but her wayward son, Shaun, takes an instant dislike to Shane, and Shane finally finds a way to make up for his actions - by helping Shaun through his grief, but Kelly fears the truth is close to being revealed. Meanwhile, a rival brothel opens up on the estate, and threatens to put Lillian out of business when many of the locals, including Frank, begin getting serviced elsewhere, and to make matters worse, Kelly has been offered a job in the new brothel. Could this be the end for Lillian's business? And, Chesney falls in love with a local girl called Beccy, but when he humiliates himself in front of her, Patty steps in to help him. Voice-over: Shane Maguire
| 121 | 6 | "Secrets and Wives" | Gordon Anderson | Jack Lothian | 10 October 2012 |
Marty decides to ask Kelly to marry him. But when he discovers that his deceased wife and children, who perished in a fire that he was framed for starting, are still alive. He is determined to find out what happened on the night of the fire. But his quest to find answers to his troubled life in Spain threaten his bright future with Kelly. Meanwhile, Karen is convinced Jamie is cheating on her and confides in Gloria, who has recently resumed her affair with Jamie. Lillian has a vision, but she cannot decipher its meaning. As she tries to solve the puzzle, she fears disaster is looming for one resident of Chatsworth. Voice-over: Marty Fisher
| 122 | 7 | "Business As Usual" | Luke Watson | Ed McCardie | 17 October 2012 |
Shane and Jackson's business is booming. Expansion is afoot and their future looks rosy. But Shane suddenly turns charitable and begins giving the homeless their stock, infuriating Jackson and causing a rivalry between the two business partners, and when the local priest begins stealing their business contracts, Shane discovers his one good deed could ruin him and the Powell family for good. Meanwhile, the residents are shocked by Patty's sudden generosity towards her neighbours. But when she begins hosting a coffee morning for the elderly, they discover a scam is afoot, and the whole estate turn against her. An outcast in the community, Patty finds her problems only just beginning when she is targeted by a hate campaign. Billy is having trouble in the bedroom, and a devastated Mimi is convinced he no longer loves her. Voice-over: Jackson Powell Note: This is the second and final episode to not feature any members of the Gallaghers family and the third and final Shameless episode not to feature the main character Frank Gallagher.
| 123 | 8 | "What Are Friends For?" | Andy McDonnell | Jimmy Dowdall | 24 October 2012 |
When an old flame commits suicide, Dominic's faith is completely destroyed. Feeling he has no purpose to life, Dominic enlists Frank's help - to end his life. Can Frank single-handedly prevent Dominic's various attempts at suicide and convince him to change his ways? Meanwhile, Letitia decides it's time to lose her virginity, and sets her sights on Aidan. However, Aidan has found love with someone else. With Gloria's help, will Letitia get what she wants, or will another Chatsworth resident seduce her? Lillian becomes a life-coach for a magistrate. Voice-over: Dominic Meak
| 124 | 9 | "Great Rivalry" | Andy McDonnell | Ed McCardie | 31 October 2012 |
When he begins receiving threatening letters, Jamie fears the Maguire's past has, again, returned to haunt them, and when Karen and Connor find themselves in danger, Jamie's love for his wife is tested to the limit when he receives a ransom. But he soon discovers that he enemy lies much closer to home. Meanwhile, Avril makes a shocking discovery about Patty - she's dying. Elsewhere, Frank is determined to prove to Dominic and Billy that he has slept with everyone on the Chatsworth estate, and his time at the World of Burgers comes to an end, while Kelly discovers Lillian is not a British citizen. Voice-over: Karen Maguire
| 125 | 10 | "One Year On" | Luke Watson | Ed McCardie | 1 November 2012 |
It's Mimi and Billy's first wedding anniversary, and they decide to mark the occasion by renewing their vows. Determined to make changes to her life, Mimi attempts to throw away everything about her marriage to Paddy. But she causes a rift within the Maguire family when she makes a hurtful comment about Ruby's father, leading to a life-or-death stand-off between the whole family, with at least one of them breathing their last breath. Meanwhile, Patty wants to visit Ireland before she dies, and Kelly persuades a reluctant Frank to accompany her, and the heartbreaking events that follow threaten to change Frank forever. Elsewhere, Avril and Jackson's marriage is well and truly on the rocks as Avril's deception is finally revealed, while a heartbroken Gloria ends up in bed with the most unlikely Chatsworth resident - her brother, Dominic. Voice-over: Patty Croker Final Appearance: Ruby Hepburn, Patty Croker, Jackson Powell

=== Series 11 (2013) ===
| No. overall | No. in series | Title | Directed by | Written by | Original release date |
|---|---|---|---|---|---|
| 126 | 1 | "The Golden Empire" | Paul Norton Walker | Jimmy Dowdall | 26 February 2013 |
It's a grand occasion as the residents of Chatsworth celebrate being awarded an Olympic ring from London 2012. The Maguires toast the expansion of their empire: Mimi's hijacked control of the local school via the PTA and Shane's setting up a new business venture. Business is booming, but the family is thrown into turmoil when Jamie discovers Paddy is not his father, tearing him and Mimi apart and forcing him to question everything he knows. Meanwhile, Frank is climbing the employment ladder as caretaker of "St Mimi's School", conveniently funding his new leisure activity - the Gastric Bandits, a prostitute double act with Sherilee and Derilee. Elsewhere, Avril's marriage has ended, leaving her and Letitia on the streets, forcing Avril to ask her eccentric, snobbish sister, Patreesha St. Rose (Jacqueline Boatswain), for help. Voice over: Jamie Maguire First Appearance: Kassi Blanco, Sgt Randall, Sherilee, Derilee, Patreesha St. Rose and Mary-Mae St. Rose
| 127 | 2 | "An Inspector Calls" | Dominic Leclerc | Jack Lothian | 5 March 2013 |
As a member of the PTA, Mimi demands respect. But when the teachers threaten to quit over the return of a notorious troublemaker and Mimi's quick to dole out advice, Headmaster Banbury could not care less. When Mimi hears that the school will be failed by School Inspector Edward Clayhill, she recruits the residents of Chatsworth to help her save the day. Meanwhile, Jamie tries to contact his half-brother Kassi, but after his violent outburst in The Jockey, Kassi would not pick up the phone, forcing Jamie to question whether his new brother has a place in his life. Elsewhere, Frank discovers an unexpected perk of being caretaker at the school: 24-hour access. Quick to take advantage, Frank invites the Gastric Bandits for an after-hours drug-fuelled romp, while Gloria and Dominic continue to hide their sordid affair. But how long can they keep their disgraced secret? Voice over: Dominic Meak First Appearance: Tam Blanco Final Appearance: Gloria Meak Please Note, The title is a reference to the popular play An Inspector Calls.
| 128 | 3 | "Money in Mind" | Paul Norton Walker | Mark Brotherhood | 12 March 2013 |
Kelly agrees to help save Lillian's savings from police survelliance. But when she discovers how much Lillian has, she is forced to decide what she values money and a chance to escape life in Chatsworth or Lillian's friendship? Meanwhile, Mimi attempts to build the confidence of a schoolteacher who has just lost her husband. But she ends up creating another version of herself. Elsewhere, Patreesha plans a housewarming party for Avril. But sibling rivalry soon comes to the surface, while Frank continues his affair with the Gastric Bandits. Voice over: Kelly Maguire
| 129 | 4 | "No-One's Perfect" | Dominic Leclerc | Sean Conway | 19 March 2013 |
Jamie discovers his brother's life is not as perfect as it seems when Kassi's house is raided by the police. Once released from police custody, Kassi refuses to tell Jamie about his troubles, asking his brother to find him and his family a place to live in Chatsworth. As his kids befriend the locals and his wife Esther takes an unlikely shine to Frank, Kassi must deal with his growing troubles - and an enraged Mimi, But will a dinner party between the Blancos, Gallaghers and Maguires help to un-strain relations or will it be a night of chaos? Meanwhile, Shane is playing a dangerous game as he continues his sexual relationship with Sgt Randall. Elsewhere, Kelly and Marty decide to buy a house with their recent windfall. But the residents are suspicious about their new wealth, causing them to make a life-changing decision about their future, while a 6-year-old Stella Gallagher follows in her sibling's footsteps by taking over at the Gallagher household. Voice over: Jamie Maguire First Appearance: Esther, Thalia and Saul Blanco Final Appearance: Kelly Maguire and Marty Fisher.
| 130 | 5 | "Risky Business" | Daikin Marsh | Mark Brotherhood | 26 March 2013 |
Chesney meets Remona, a fiery chemist while looking for a replacement chillers and he soon decides to renovate Chesco, add a pharmacy department and employ her to run it. But will his new business move cost him - and Chatsworth itself - dearly? Meanwhile, Kassi, Shane and Jamie plan a night out. But the night ends in disaster when Kassi finds himself behind bars, and Jamie and Karen are stunned by Esther's relaxed attitude towards the situation. Elsewhere, Avril is forced to work at her sister's car wash. But she soon discovers Patreesha's life is not as perfect as she makes out. First Appearance: Remona Final Appearance: Kassi Blanco Voice over: Chesney Karib
| 131 | 6 | "Death and Erasures" | Gordon Anderson | Jack Lothian | 2 April 2013 |
Aidan is again in trouble with the law. Sentenced to community service, Aidan is forced to care for an OAP called Stanton. But his life is thrown into turmoil when Stanton dies, and he finds himself under suspicion for murder by Dominic. Meanwhile, Esther's daughter, Thalia, is becoming increasingly irritated by her mother's friendship with Frank, and resorts to desperate measures to erase Frank from the Blanco family for good. Voice over: Stanton Final Appearance: Dominic Meak
| 132 | 7 | "Crime and Punishment" | Paul Norton Walker | Jimmy Dowdall | 9 April 2013 |
Shane's music festival plans are coming along nicely - the site looks impressive and tickets are selling fast. But when Mimi and Jamie find out about his relationship with copper Randall, the event is thrown into jeopardy. Can Karen come to his rescue? Meanwhile, Letitia and Aidan come up with a plan to bring Chesney and Mary-Mae together. Voice over: Shane Maguire
| 133 | 8 | "Grandaddy Gallagher" | David Threlfall | Loren McLaughlan & Amy Roberts | 16 April 2013 |
Frank is shocked when he boards a bus - only to be reunited with his eldest son, Lip, and granddaughter Katie. However, it is not a pleasant reunion between father and son as it soon becomes clear that Lip is living in the area, but doesn't want Katie to be associated with his alcoholic father or Chatsworth. When he discovers Mimi has been a part of Katie's life for years, Frank begins bonding with his granddaughter. But Lip's life is not as perfect as it seems, and he soon finds himself embracing the life he has been trying to forget. Will Frank and Lip be able to settle their differences? Meanwhile, Saul begins rebelling after joining Remona's scout group, and it's up to Jamie to show his new nephew the right path Return and Final Appearance: Lip Gallagher (until episode 14) Voice over: Lip Gallagher
| 134 | 9 | "Domesticated Specialist" | Daikin Marsh | John Kerr | 23 April 2013 |
A robbery at Chesney's shop reunites Remona with her estranged father, Barry. But she is not willing to rekindle their relationship. However, Chesney befriends Barry and asks him to move in with him and Remona when his wife Mindy leaves him. But Chesney soon discovers Barry is not as friendly as he makes out. But is he too late to save Remona and Mindy? Meanwhile, Frank thinks he's hit the jackpot when he finds a stash of drugs at Esther's. But Esther is livid when she discovers they belong to Tam. Trying to stop her son from supplying drugs, Esther takes her kids, along with Frank, Karen and Shane, to a Polish club dance, with disastrous consequences. Elsewhere, Shane is pushed to breaking point as Randall becomes completely obsessed with him. Voice over: Chesney Karib
| 135 | 10 | "Crossing the Line" | Gordon Anderson | Melissa Bubnic | 30 April 2013 |
Tired of being the "village idiot", Billy decides to get a job as a security salesman to earn Mimi and the locals respect. But his lack of experience or qualifications ruin his chances, Billy's life begins unraveling around him when he pretends to secure a job and he begins sinking to shocking levels in his quest for respect. Meanwhile, Esther is shocked when she discovers Thalia is a bully. Trying to turn Thalia into a more compassionate person, Esther starts to apologise to everyone Thalia has ill-treated. But it seems she has upset many Chatsworth residents. Elsewhere, Lillian takes a lonely Stella under her wing as Frank continues to neglect his daughter. But Stella ends up infesting Lillian's brothel with nits. Voice over: Billy Tutton
| 136 | 11 | "The P Factor" | Luke Watson | Jack Lothian | 7 May 2013 |
Patreesha thinks she is the latest British music export to the United States when her new jazz musician boyfriend Louis promises her a lucrative singing career across the pond. But when Louis dies, she and Avril go to war over a large amount of money in his possessions. But will a fake kidnapping, a family gathering and an encounter with two thugs and a gang of hustled women finally break the feud between the sisters? or will it tear them apart for good? Meanwhile, a misunderstanding with Mimi leads to Frank becoming an outcast amongst the Chatsworth community. Barred from The Jockey and with even Esther and Stella turned against him, Frank falls in with a "brotherhood" of outcasts. Elsewhere, Letitia's 18th is approaching. But will Aidan finally get the chance to charm her? Voice over: Patreesha St. Rose
| 137 | 12 | "Early Retirement" | Paul Norton Walker | Jimmy Dowdall | 14 May 2013 |
It seems Chatsworth may never be the same again when Mimi announces her plans to retire and move to Wilmslow to dedicate her life to charity. Is this the end of the Maguire's? and will a reluctant Billy be joining her? Final appearance of: Sgt Randall Voice over: Mimi Tutton
| 138 | 13 | "Kiss, Kiss, Bang, Bang" | Tim Whitby | Loren McLaughlan & Amy Roberts | 21 May 2013 |
Things are looking up for Frank: Derilee has left her husband and joined him at the Gallaghers, becoming a surrogate mum for Stella and his job is going well. However, things are set to change forever when a gunman runs riot on the estate - It's Derilee's husband Baxter and his target is Frank. As police swarm the estate, Frank, Derilee and Stella are held hostage, and if that was not enough for the feckless Gallagher to handle: ex-wife Monica is back! Meanwhile, Lillian has a new boyfriend, while Mimi's feud with the Blanco family reaches a climax. Return of: Monica Gallagher Final appearance of: Sherilee and Derilee Voice over: Derilee
| 139 | 14 | "End of the Line" | David Threlfall | Jack Lothian | 28 May 2013 |
After spending months in jail, Frank returns to Chatsworth hoping for a welcome home party. However, he finds there's a new addition to the Gallagher brood - a new son called Ben, who survived an abortion attempt on twins. As ever the drama queen, Monica summons the rest of the Gallagher siblings back home. But only Lip, Carl - and Fiona, answer the summoning. Seeing the shambles her parents are in and determined to stop history from repeating itself, Fiona concocts a plan with Kev Ball to steal Stella and baby Ben. But will Frank finally do right by his family? Or will he take the opportunity to finally free himself of fatherhood? Meanwhile, Chesney and Mary-Mae are expecting a baby, so Chesney recruits his mother, Yvonne, to look after the shop. Final Appearance of: Frank Gallagher, Stella Gallagher, Monica Gallagher, Karen Maguire, Lillian Tyler, Jamie Maguire, Shane Maguire, Mimi Maguire, Billy Tutton, Avril Powell, Letitia Powell, Esther Blanco, Saul Blanco, Thalia Blanco, Tam Blanco, Aidan Croker, Chesney Karib, Patreesha St. Rose, Mary-Mae St. Rose and Remona Return and Final Appearance of: Fiona Gallagher, Carl Gallagher, Lip Gallagher, Kev Ball and Yvonne Karib Voice over: Frank Gallagher
