= Ian Gallagher =

TV character

Ian Gallagher is a character from the British Channel 4 comedy drama Shameless and its American remake on Showtime.

== British version ==
Ian Gallagher
- Shameless character
- Portrayed by: Gerard Kearns
- Duration: 2004–2010
- First appearance: 13 January 2004; Series 1 Episode 1 "Meet the Gallaghers"
- Last appearance: 11 May 2010; Series 7 Episode 16 "Gang Wars"
- Created by: Paul Abbott
In-universe information
- Father: Gary Bennett
- Mother: Monica Gallagher
- Adoptive father: Frank Gallagher
- Half-brothers: Lip Gallagher; Carl Gallagher; Liam Gallagher; Sean Bennett
- Half-sisters: Fiona Gallagher; Debbie Gallagher; Stella Gallagher
- Grandmothers: Joan Dallimore
- Nieces: Katie Maguire

=== Character biography ===
Ian Gallagher is the third oldest Gallagher sibling and is aged 15 at the beginning of the first series in 2004. He is the son of Monica Gallagher (Annabelle Apsion) and Gary Bennett, revealed when his blood group was found to be incompatible with the rest of his siblings'. His half-brothers are Phillip "Lip" Gallagher (Jody Latham), Carl Gallagher (Elliott Tittensor), Liam Gallagher (Johnny Bennett) and Sean Bennett, and his half-sisters are Fiona Gallagher (Anne-Marie Duff), Debbie Gallagher (Rebecca Ryan), Stella Gallagher (Nikita Brownlee) and Ben Gallagher. He has a step-brother Nigel and step-sister Delia (born to Frank and Sheila). He has one niece, Katie Maguire, who is the daughter of Lip. He used to work at The Jockey as a barman but in more recent series his employment, if he has any, has not been shown.

In the early series, Ian is depicted as closest to his brother Lip, with whom he shares a room, and is initially the only member of his family to know that he was gay. The brothers often have to look out for each other more than any of the other characters, due to being party to each other's secrets. In later series, all the family, except his step-father Frank Gallagher (David Threlfall), are aware of his sexuality. However, Frank was hinted to be aware of his sexuality and may have ignored it.

Ian often identifies as gay, having various relationships with older men throughout the first four or five series. Kash Karib (boyfriend, though he has a brief relationship with Sean Bennett, and an ongoing friendship, sometimes sexual, with Mickey Maguire (Ciarán Griffiths). He has a relationship of convenience with Mandy Maguire (Samantha Siddall), to protect his secret, which nearly turns sexual when they're both at a low point, but they fumble about until Ian decides it's a bad idea. In the seventh series, Ian begins a serious relationship with Maxine Donnelly (Joanna Higson). When Maxine's brother, Bruce (Philip Hill-Pearson) asks if their being in a relationship means Ian is now "bisexual", Ian pauses, before saying he just believes he has found the right person.

Due to Gerard Kearns' break to work on a film, Ian leaves in the first episode of the sixth series after suffering amnesia after being struck by a car. He is seen in episode two in a clip of him partying abroad and appears on webcam in later episodes. He returns in the seventh episode; this features the debut of Danny, a deaf teenager whom Ian unwittingly transports back to the UK in the boot of his car. Ian now lives in the house of Danny's deceased grandfather, which was leased to him by Danny's aunt, Pegg, in gratitude for looking after him. Danny and Pegg later move to Spain.

In Series 7 in 2010, it appears Ian has remained at Danny's old address and has accepted Mickey as a tenant. Ian supports Carl's girlfriend, Maxine, when she decides to have an abortion and break up with Carl. Maxine moves in with Ian and Mickey. The situation becomes complicated when Maxine asks Ian to pose as her boyfriend to impress her parents. Ian and Maxine begin to develop feelings for each other and have sex. Mickey sees them and tries to convince Ian he should not be with a woman, but Ian says the labels don't matter, he wants to be with Maxine. This leads to a major falling out with Mickey, who feels betrayed. Mickey tells Carl, who then beats up Ian in the toilets at The Jockey. In spite of the remaining tensions, Ian and Maxine become a couple.

Even with the lingering animosity from Carl and Mickey, Ian and Maxine are happy but they are thrown into turmoil when Carl, along with Chesney Karib (Qasim Akhtar), runs away after being accused of murder. Ian is initially not bothered with Carl's absence, and is more concerned at just how concerned Maxine is over Carl. When Ian and Maxine are in The Jockey, Maxine confronts Jimmy, whom everyone knows is the killer. As Ian looks on, Jimmy's sister hits Maxine over the head with a pool cue. Ian feels ashamed that he let Maxine fight the battle on her own and in spite of her reassurances, he begins to believe that she would have been better off with Carl. To try to prove his worth, Ian attempts to tape a confession from Jimmy, but Jimmy sees through his plan and savagely beats him. Ian begins to further withdraw and is unable to have sex with Maxine; during the time they do spend together, he becomes more paranoid about her feelings every time she mentions Carl. Carl's name is soon cleared and he attempts to make amends with Ian, but Ian isn't interested. He again accuses Maxine of wanting to be with Carl, to which she tells Ian she just doesn't want to be with him. In spite of this conflict, Ian and Maxine still have strong feelings for each other, and Carl convinces Maxine that she and Ian belong together. Ian shows up at hospital soon after Carl and Maxine talk, and he and Maxine smile at each other, and they reconcile.

In the finale of Series 7, Ian and Maxine were returning home after a night out, when they are accosted by a rough whom attempts to mug them. But they fight back and overpower the thug, and drag him back unconscious to their house. The thug turns out to be a hireling of Roscoe, a Moss Side-based crime lord. After hours of deciding what to do with him, Maxine overhears a conversation where Ian admits that he would "rather fuck him than kill him". This seems to be the end of the relationship, as Ian's sexuality may might turn out to be the source of future infidelities. When Ian prepares himself to kill the thug, Maxine and he find that he escaped from his bonds while they were conversing. Ian is seen later with a backpack, apparently leaving Chatsworth. It is not stated whether it is because he is leaving Maxine or if it is to avoid retribution by Roscoe's gang. He happens to bump into Karen Maguire (Rebecca Atkinson), as she and the abusive Joe Pritchard (Ben Batt) are about to leave Chatsworth themselves. After witnessing Joe's abusive treatment of Karen, Ian stows away in the boot of Joe's car. After Joe begins to strangle Karen, Ian kills him and makes his exit from the show to dispose of the body.

In a later episode in Series 8, Carl is shown to get a "Happy Birthday" text from Ian. In the series finale, it is revealed that Ian is now engaged to a transgender person. In the UK version, Ian appeared in 80 episodes overall.

=== Development ===
Ian's character is distilled from several sources in series creator Paul Abbott's life, including a gay nephew who is not out to the rest of his family. Ian's relationship with Kash is based on a similar affair that Abbott had with a grocer's wife when he was 14, with the adult's gender switched for Ian's story.

== American version ==
Ian Gallagher
- Shameless character
- Cameron Monaghan as Ian Gallagher
- Portrayed by: Cameron Monaghan
- Duration: 2011–2021
- First appearance: "Pilot" (2011)
- Last appearance: "Father Frank, Full of Grace" (2021)
- Created by: Paul Abbott
In-universe information
- Occupation: Student; Convenience store clerk Stripper; Dishwasher; EMT; Rentboy
- Father: Clayton Gallagher (possible biological father)
- Mother: Monica Gallagher
- Adoptive father: Frank Gallagher (also paternal uncle)
- Half-brothers: Lip Gallagher (also cousin); Carl Gallagher (also cousin); Liam Gallagher (also cousin)
- Half-sisters: Fiona Gallagher (also cousin and guardian); Debbie Gallagher (also cousin)
- Spouse: Mickey Milkovich (husband)
- Grandfathers: Bill Darrgen (maternal); Frank's unnamed father (paternal)
- Grandmothers: Peggy Gallagher (paternal); Monica's unnamed mother (maternal)
- Aunts and uncles: Jerry Gallagher (paternal uncle); Wyatt Gallagher; Frank Gallagher; Ginger Gallagher (great-aunt)

=== Character biography ===
Ian Clayton Gallagher was born on May 9, 1996, the product of a PCP-fueled affair between his mother Monica and Clayton Gallagher, Frank's brother, in the summer of 1995. Monica conceals knowledge of this affair from the Gallagher family, leaving them to believe that Ian is Frank's son. Ian is gay and, initially, closeted. When his older brother Lip discovers a cache of gay pornography in their shared bedroom, he first confronts Ian with it and then sets Ian up to receive oral sex from Karen Jackson, a neighbor whom Lip tutors. When Karen confirms that Ian was unaroused by her ministrations, Lip comes to accept his brother and becomes Ian's trusted confidant.

Ian is highly orderly and disciplined, traits that are attributed to his membership in his school's Junior Reserve Officers' Training Corps, rather than his upbringing. He is an excellent marksman.

When the series opens, Ian is involved in a sexual relationship with Kash, owner of the Kash and Grab, the neighborhood convenience store where Ian works. Kash, a Muslim, is married to Linda and has two children with her. Usually, Ian and Kash have sex in the storeroom, but one weekend when Linda and the children are out of town, Kash brings Ian to their home. Upon seeing the reality of Kash's life with his family, Ian balks at having sex with him.

Ian's schoolmate, Mandy Milkovich, expresses a sexual interest in him. When he does not reciprocate, she tells her brothers that Ian assaulted her. After evading them, he comes out to Mandy, who not only calls off her brothers but suggests that she be his sham girlfriend to deflect any questions about his sexuality.

Ian continues his affair with Kash, but Linda, who has installed security cameras in response to rampant shoplifting at the store, catches them in the act on tape. Surprisingly, she does not mind if the affair continues but demands that Kash impregnate her before he has sex with Ian again. Meanwhile, Mandy's brother Mickey, an aggressive shoplifter who has been terrorizing Kash, steals the gun kept in the store for protection. Ian confronts Mickey at his home, determined to retrieve it. In the ensuing altercation, the pair realize their attraction and have sex. They maintain the sexual relationship, although Mickey denies any emotional attraction to Ian; Ian cools off his relationship with Kash. Eventually, Kash catches the two having sex in the store and, in response, shoots Mickey in the leg and has him arrested, following Mickey's brazen theft of a candy bar.

Ian feels that Frank resents him. The truth is uncovered when Ian undergoes DNA testing when Lip hopes to prove that Frank is not the children's biological father. Ian receives a shock when it is revealed that he is the son of Frank's brother, which makes Frank his uncle and Ian the half-sibling, as well as cousin, of the other children.

Following the news of Ian's parentage, Lip encourages him to find his biological father. Upon visiting "Grammy", Frank's mother, who is incarcerated on charges relating to two deaths in a meth lab explosion, Ian and Lip learn that Frank has three brothers, Clayton, Jerry and Wyatt. Wyatt, however, is eliminated from consideration because he lost his testicles while serving in the Navy. Jerry, who turns out to be Frank's twin, refuses to speak to the boys. Clayton closely resembles Ian, and the boys assume he is Ian's father. Lip suggests that the affluent Clayton would make a better father than Frank but Ian is disgusted by this. Outside, Ian insists to Lip stop pushing his issues on him and he states that Frank is his father just as Lip and the rest of his siblings are his family, where he belongs. Ian's choice is accepted by his brother and by an overhearing Clayton.

Season 1 closes with Ian's arrest and release after being stopped with Lip in a car stolen by Fiona's boyfriend Steve. He tells Fiona that he's gay and Fiona claims she already knows.

In Season two, Ian still works at the Kash and Grab, but his physical relationship with Kash is apparently over. It permanently ends when Kash, who can no longer reconcile being gay and married, leaves. Ian is no longer interested in the Marines, setting the goal of obtaining admission to West Point. He does not have the grades to be accepted, so Lip offers tutoring. Although willing to help him, Lip is opposed to Ian joining the military to "fight for a country that thinks you're one of God's mistakes". A colonel, whom Lip knows through a contact at a local university, leaves a West Point application with Ian, who is chagrined to learn that the officer thinks Lip is the interested party. This leads to a physical confrontation between the brothers. They refuse to communicate with each other until Grammy, recently released from prison for medical reasons, convinces them to fight and work through their issues. After a short battle, Ian confesses that he feels trapped in Lip's shadow. He and Lip reconcile.

Mickey is released from juvenile detention and he and Ian resume their relationship. Mickey starts working security at the Kash and Grab. Frank catches the boys having sex in the cooler and Mickey, fearing that his father will kill him, resolves to kill Frank. After stalking him for several days, Mickey changed his mind and assaulted a police officer instead, which violated his parole; returning him to juvenile detention, where his father can't hurt him.

Monica Gallagher returns home, following the death of Frank's mother, Grammy. She tells Ian that Frank told her about Mickey and that he should be proud of who he is, and that she accepts him. The next day, Ian, depressed over a poor computer science test score, allows Monica to take him to a local enlistment center to join the Army. He is rejected, because he has not graduated high school. The following morning, Ian is attacked in his kitchen by Terry Milkovich, father of Ian's sham girlfriend Mandy, because he believes Ian has gotten her pregnant.

Ian spends the next few days avoiding Terry but it becomes increasingly more difficult. Lip suggests they plant Grammy's old gun in the Milkovich home; this will violate Terry's parole and, if the gun is tied to a murder, could get him incarcerated for life. They break in and discover Terry already has several guns; they plant theirs anyway. Terry catches them. Lip escapes, but Terry corners Ian and is about to shoot him when Mandy, brandishing a rifle, orders him to stop. Terry already knows that he himself impregnated Mandy. Mandy later explains to Ian that when Terry drinks, he sometimes mistakes her for her deceased mother, but insists "it's no big deal". Ian helps raise funds for an abortion.

The night before Thanksgiving, Ian returns to the gay bar. He is picked up by an older gentleman, who calls himself Ned. They spend the night together, where Ned says “I’m going to cum on those ginger cakes”. A few days later, Fiona's on-again off-again boyfriend, Jimmy, arranges a dinner for the Gallaghers and his family. Ian is shocked to learn that "Ned" is really Lloyd, Jimmy's father. Ian tries to tell Fiona several times, but is interrupted when Frank shoves him against the wall out of anger for Monica leaving. Ian is saved when Jimmy's wife, Estefania, hits him over the head with a frying pan.

The third season takes place several months later. Ian is still trying to improve his chances of getting into West Point, while helping with the financial stability of the family. His relationship with Lloyd has turned into somewhat of a friends-with-benefits. When Mickey returns, Ian feels confused over whether Mickey actually likes him or not, especially after he has sex with a girl from their neighborhood. He later realizes that Mickey cares about him when he follows him and Lloyd to a gay bar. Lloyd later asks Ian if he could break into his house to steal back his things, since his soon-to-be ex-wife changed the locks. Ian enlists Mickey and a couple of their friends to do it. Mickey asks Ian why he likes Lloyd, and Ian says it's because he isn't afraid to kiss him. Right before Mickey goes into Lloyd's house for the heist, he kisses Ian for the first time. When Ian and the rest of the Gallagher children are taken away by DCFS, Mickey lets him stay at his house, since his father Terry was away on a hunting trip. Terry ends up coming home early and catches Mickey and Ian having sex. He beats both of them, and forces Ian to watch Mickey have sex with a prostitute. Afterwards, Mickey goes to great lengths to avoid Ian. Eventually, Mickey is forced to marry the prostitute after finding out she's pregnant, but he and Ian have sex on Mickey's wedding day. The season closes with Ian, believing he has no future with Mickey, using his brother Lip's identification to join the military.

Several weeks elapse between seasons three and four, and no one hears from Ian in that time. Lip receives a visit from two military police officers, who inform him that Ian is wanted for attempting to steal a helicopter and other military equipment and being absent without leave. He denies knowing Ian but he and Debbie eventually find him at a gay bar, where Ian got a job as a bartender.

Mickey finds Ian passed out at another bar, Fairy Tails, and brings him to the Milkovich home. After Svetlana, Mickey's wife, threatens him, Ian moves back home. Mickey and Ian launch a criminal enterprise, robbing closeted gay men and threatening to out them if they report the crime. Following his manic behavior throughout the season, Ian is laid up in bed in a deep depression, worrying his family that he has inherited his mother Monica's bipolar disorder. Mickey insists that he can take care of him, but Ian runs away with Mickey and Svetlana's baby, leading to his arrest. He than voluntarily commits himself to a psychiatric hospital. He's released after 72 hour, but refuses to take his medication until he almost hurts Debbie because of his psychosis. Mickey accompanies him to the clinic where Ian gets new medication, which he starts to take. He claims the medication makes him feel numb and gets into a physical confrontation with Mickey brought on by guilt and embarrassment that Mickey needs to care for him. Later that night, Ian is arrested by the military, which was called by Sammi (Frank's oldest daughter). He is later released after they discover his condition. He returns home to break up with Mickey, who is promptly chased by Sammi, who wants to kill him as revenge.

During Season 6, he visits Mickey in prison and falsely promises to wait for him. He begins a job as a volunteer fireman after he saves a woman from a burning car, though he needs to be saved too. Ian later finds Caleb, the fireman who saved him, and flirts with him. However, Caleb is different from Ian's previous partners because he wants something real, leading Ian into his first real relationship. Ian also gets a job as an EMT and threatens legal action when they consider firing him due to his condition. Much later, he and Caleb confide personal secrets and establish trust in one another. In the finale, he joins everyone (except Lip, Fiona, and Liam) in throwing Frank off a bridge when he ruins Fiona's wedding.

In season 7, he is still seeing Caleb, although his boss tells him that Caleb might be cheating. Ian and his brothers are not too surprised to find Frank survived the fall, but want nothing to do with him. Ian discovers that Caleb is bisexual and experiments with it himself, but the event doesn't suit him. Ian breaks up with Caleb and goes home, only to find that Frank got revenge by sealing the family out of their house with cement and taking Liam. In the events after, Ian goes through a manic episode because of his break-up, but Fiona helps him through it. The family find Frank opened a homeless shelter, and he turns them away for their actions against him. Ian forms a relationship with Trevor, a transgender man, and they are happy, until Mickey breaks out of prison and comes back into his life. They plan to flee to Mexico, but Ian backs out at the last minute and Mickey escapes alone. He returns home to attend his mother's funeral and he makes amends with Frank in the finale.

In season 8, Ian attempts to reconcile with Trevor, but is met with resistance. Ian seems to be the only other person other than Frankto mourn Monica's death. Ian becomes put off by Frank's behavioral change and believes he has lost his mind. However, he is persuaded a little when Frank defends him and the rest of his checks from an armed meth head. Ian is amused when Frank bonds with Liam and even gives helpful advice. Towards the end of the season, he stops his medication and becomes a religious fanatic known as "Gay Jesus". As a result, he is arrested for arson.

During season 9, Ian continues to have manic episodes after stopping his medication, though he tends to improve once he begins taking it again. He talks with Mickey's father, Terry, asking what he can expect in prison. He almost flees, but a talk with Fiona convinces him to do the right thing and turn himself in. Ian confesses to being bipolar and is sent to two years in prison, where he finds that Mickey is his new cellmate and the reunited lovers resume their relationship. In the finale, he's visited by Fiona, who tells him about her recent financial gain. Ian persuades her to leave and live her life. At the end, he sees the plane she's on and bids her farewell.

In season 10, Ian is still dating Mickey, although the two continue to have a rocky relationship. Ian eventually gets paroled, with Mickey being paroled not long after, but they get a corrupt parole officer. When their parole officer is murdered, Ian and Mickey are questioned as potential suspects. Ian suggests to Mickey that if they were to get married, they couldn't testify against each other; however, Ian gets cold feet and ends their relationship again. Ian eventually admits to his insecurities about how Mickey can love Ian with all of his issues, believing Mickey can potentially find someone better. After overhearing Mickey's new boyfriend, Byron, badmouthing all of the qualities about Mickey that he loves, Ian beats Byron and proposes to Mickey on the spot; who accepts. Ian and Mickey get married in the season finale.

In season 11, Ian and Mickey settle into married life. They both have a great relationship with Frannie, Debbie’s daughter. The two eventually begin an armed escorting service, moving money for several legal cannabis dealers throughout the city. Ian assists Mickey with caring for Terry, who becomes paralyzed after being shot. They eventually leave him in the care of a nun, who kills him. They move out of the Gallagher house and into a condo together. They discuss having children, but this is left open-ended.

=== Development ===
Ian has been described as "the anti-Kurt Hummel". Actor Monaghan said he was drawn to the role because "[i]t’s one of those really intricate, multi-layered characters, with all this inner struggle going on." He believes that Ian is different from other contemporary gay teenage characters on American television because he does not conform to any gay stereotypes, and because of the character's blend of positive traits. "He’s smart and he’s tough and he's brave and he’s really caring and responsible—and I think that’s not always shown in one character."

=== Reception ===
Several critics have praised Ian's dynamic with Lip. Reviewing the pilot episode, Sarah Hughes of The Independent wrote that their relationship was a highlight of the UK series, and proved just as effective in the US adaptation. She additionally commended Monaghan's portrayal for providing "one of the more nuanced depictions of a gay teenager to be seen on US TV." In a generally unfavorable review of the series, Variety's Brian Lowry assessed that "what little soul it possesses" is derived from the Ian–Lip relationship. Matthew Gilbert of The Boston Globe called Monaghan "extraordinary", and wrote: "The moments when Lip confronts Ian about his sexuality are remarkably honest and refreshing, as they each slowly realize they don't need to play out predictably hostile roles." In contrast, Mary McNamara of the Los Angeles Times opined that their relationship "borders on treacle". The gay-interest media outlet, AfterElton.com, cited Monaghan's portrayal of Ian in naming him a "breakout actor" for 2011. In 2014, Hollywood.com named Ian Gallagher in their list of "Favorite LGBTQ Characters on TV".

In 2015, Monaghan received a nomination for the Critic's Choice Award for Best Supporting Actor in a Comedy Series.
