= The Visitor (2007 short film) =

- Directed by: Dave Smith
- Starring: Ciarán Griffiths; Conrad Westmaas
- Production company: EM Media
- Distributed by: UK Film Council
- Release date: 2007
- Country: United Kingdom
- Language: English

The Visitor is a 2007 British short film directed by Dave Smith and starring Ciarán Griffiths and Conrad Westmaas.

== See also ==
- The Visitor - a feature film written and directed by Thomas McCarthy
