= Mickey Maguire (Shameless) =

Soap opera character

Mickey Maguire (British) and Mickey Milkovich (American) are characters from the British Channel 4 comedy drama, Shameless, and its American remake on Showtime.

== British version ==
Mickey Maguire is a character from the British Channel 4 comedy drama, Shameless. Originally, he was just like the rest of the Maguire family: aggressive, violent, and prone to violent outbursts. He was erratic and obsessively licks the side of his mouth, which could be a tic and/or hint of a behavioural disorder. Mickey is a closeted homosexual, something which became the punchline in later seasons. Mickey slowly matured as the show progressed, becoming less violent and aggressive and more kind to people, something which results in further mockery by his biological family. Despite his exaggerated personality, he often runs away at the first sign of trouble. Although his father Paddy Maguire (Sean Gilder) often shows him disrespect and is violent towards him, Paddy claims to love his son. Mickey was the most idealistic of his family and the most loyal to his parents. In spite of Paddy's lack of faith in him, Mickey was the only person who tracked down Paddy after he was shot and left for dead. Mickey appeared in 84 episodes in total.

Mickey Maguire
- Shameless character
- Portrayed by: Ciarán Griffiths
- Duration: 2007–2012
- First appearance: 9 January 2007; Series 4 Episode 1 "New Beginnings"
- Last appearance: 31 January 2012; Series 9 Episode 5 "Cop Killer"
- Created by: Paul Abbott
- Introduced by: George Faber
In-universe information
- Occupation: Drug dealer, gangster
- Father: Paddy Maguire
- Mother: Mimi Maguire
- Stepfather: Billy Tutton (2011–2012)
- Brothers: Donny Maguire; Fergal Maguire; Joey Maguire; Shane Maguire
- Sisters: Mandy Maguire
- Half-brothers: Jamie Maguire
- Half-sisters: Cilla Tutton
- Grandfathers: Padraig Maguire; Joey Murphy
- Grandmothers: Nana Murphy
- Uncles: Noel Maguire; Kenny Hepburn
- Aunts: Jacqueline Murphy; Sharon Murphy; Theresea Murphy; Bobbi Hepburn
- Nephews: Connor Maguire
- Nieces: Katie Maguire
- First cousins: Ruby Hepburn

=== Character biography ===
When Mickey initiates a brief and casual affair with Ian Gallagher (Gerard Kearns) and falls in love with him, Mickey exhibits the fact that he is an eager suitor when he follows Ian around and is very emotionally demanding. Unlike Ian, none of Mickey's family are aware of his homosexuality, despite several occasions when Mickey has come close to coming out to them, or has daydreams about revealing his homosexuality to his family. In his early appearances, Mickey has a dog, Nelson, whom he's been close to for years. Ian is disgusted to learn just how close they had become at one time — Mickey received oral sex from the dog when both his arms were broken — and declines to continue a relationship with Mickey. By this time, Mickey is in love with Ian and wants everyone to know. When Mickey is about to tell his family, Ian bursts into the room and tells them about what had happened with Mickey and Nelson. Paddy immediately has Nelson put down, deeply upsetting Mickey. After that, Mickey becomes obsessed with Ian, much to Ian's dismay, who constantly tries to avoid Mickey's constant advances.

The early episodes of the sixth series show Mickey attending college to study film. When he reveals to his parents that he wants to pursue further education, Paddy and Mimi (Tina Malone) ridicule him. Later on in the series, Mimi accepts the fact that Mickey is going to college and supports her son in his educational endeavours. Unfortunately, Mickey struggles with the course and is distracted by an erotic story his professor accidentally slips in with his coursework. Mickey decides that his true talents are in erotic writing and gives up his place in the class for his mother, Mimi, who loves films and has always wanted to go to college.

In the seventh series, Mickey continues to build a friendship with Ian, with whom he now shares a house. This series has proved that Mickey has a sensitive side, as explained through his dialogue with Ian when Ian became involved with Maxine Donnelly (Joanna Higson). Mickey tries to warn Ian that Maxine fancies him, not realising that Ian felt the same way about Maxine. Ian then has sex with Mickey in an attempt to forget about Maxine, but he and Maxine later have sex, which Mickey witnesses. Mickey is devastated when Ian insists he loves Maxine and wants to be with her. Mickey tells Ian that he felt like a freak before he had Ian to look up to, and now Ian has taken that away from him. Relations between Mickey and the new couple remain strained, but eventually, Mickey decides to stop letting their relationship bother him. He informs Maxine that all he wants is that when she finally realises she cannot be happy with a gay man, that she lets Ian down gently. Mickey leaves Chatsworth during ninth series after helping a young woman, Liz, give birth to a baby girl. After Liz dies in childbirth, Mickey decides to move away from Chatsworth to raise the baby, whom Liz named Jasmine before she died. When saying goodbye to Mimi, he is on the verge of telling her he is gay. However, she silences him and tells him to keep in contact. Mimi implies that she has guessed Mickey is gay.

The actor who plays Mickey, Ciarán Griffiths, announced that he would leave Shameless in 2012 during Series 9.

== American version ==
Mikhailo Aleksandr Milkovich, nicknamed Mickey, on the American remake Shameless is portrayed by Noel Fisher.

Mickey Milkovich
- Shameless character
- Portrayed by: Noel Fisher
- Duration: 2011–2021
- First appearance: "Aunt Ginger" (23 January 2011)
- Last appearance: "Father Frank, Full of Grace" (11 April 2021)
- Created by: Paul Abbott
In-universe information
- Occupation: Security at the "Kash & Grab", drug dealer, pimp
- Parents: Terry Milkovich; Mother mentioned dead
- Siblings: Mandy Milkovich; Iggy Milkovich; Tony Milkovich; Jamie Milkovich; Joey Milkovich; Molly Milkovich (half)
- Spouse: Ian Gallagher (husband)
- Children: Yevgeny Milkovich (estranged)

=== Character biography ===
When actor Noel Fisher is asked about Mickey's age, he answers, "I don't have an answer for you. It's actually something that has been joked about on set for a little while now because no one seems to know! My idea is that he is a few years older than Ian. I wouldn’t think more than three, though, but again, I'm totally making this up." The only reference in the show is in Season 2, where Mickey says that he's not going back to school because he'd still be a freshman due to not passing classes the previous year. However, the fact that he was explicitly stated to be in juvie at the time of his incarceration indicates that he has to be at most 17 when he is released from juvie for the last time in Season 3.

In Season 1, Mickey is presented as the neighbourhood thug, violent and homophobic, but as the series goes on, it is revealed to the audience that he's secretly gay. This was seen when he initially fights Ian Gallagher, but they end up having sex. The pair begin a secret fling behind the back of both Mandy — Mickey's sister and Ian's fake girlfriend — and more importantly, Mickey's father.

In the third season, Mickey is spending time with Ian after the rest of the Gallagher children are taken away by social services. Mickey lets him stay at his house since his father Terry is away on an extended hunting trip. However, Terry ends up coming home early and catches Mickey and Ian having sex. He beats both of them and forces Ian to watch Mickey being raped by Svetlana, a prostitute. Afterwards, Mickey goes to great lengths to avoid Ian. Eventually, Mickey is forced to marry Svetlana to Ian's disappointment.

In Season 4, Mickey and his wife are expecting a child, but Mickey is hardly attentive to her. He later finds Ian passed out at another bar, Fairy Tails, and brings him to the Milkovich home. After Mickey's wife Svetlana threatens him, Ian moves back home. Mickey and Ian launch a criminal enterprise: robbing closeted wealthy gay men and threaten to out them if they report the crime. Mickey goes to his son's christening and declines Ian's offer to go with him, resulting in Ian criticizing him for his closeted nature. Their argument is worsened by Terry's arrival at the party following his probationary release from jail. Ian threatens to end his relationship with Mickey over Mickey's fear of coming out. Not wanting to lose him, Mickey comes out as gay to the entirety of the bar, including Terry. Mickey and Terry get into a fist fight, and Ian unsuccessfully attempts to intervene until the police are called. Terry is sent back to jail for violating probation, while Mickey is released by a sympathetic gay officer. As a result, Mickey and Ian are free to continue their relationship. Following his manic behaviour throughout the season, Mickey finds Ian laid up in bed in a deep depression, so he calls the Gallaghers who worry that he has inherited their mother, Monica's bipolar disorder.

In Season 5, Mickey has gotten a job and is now trying to move from his past thug behaviour. He has taken to becoming more involved in his son's life and helping Svetlana take care of them with them being on better terms. After Ian's behavior spirals, Mickey insists that he can take care of him, but Ian runs away with Mickey and Svetlana's baby, leading to his arrest and ultimately being voluntarily committed. Later that night, Mickey watches Ian being arrested by the military police, which was called by Sammi, Frank's oldest daughter. When Ian returns home, Mickey is happy but Ian decides to break up with Mickey who is promptly chased by Sammi, who wants to kill him as revenge for Mickey and Debbie's attempt to murder her in retaliation for what she did to Ian.

During Season 6, Mickey is in prison for his attempted murder of Sammi. He is visited by his son and Ian, who falsely promises to wait for him.

In Season 7, he breaks out of prison and comes back into Ian's life. Mickey persuades Ian to flee the country with him, and Ian agrees. However, Ian backs out, and Mickey escapes to Mexico. During Mickey's absence in the eighth season, Sveltana and Yevgeny exit the show — and Mickey's life — after her rough breakup with Kevin and Veronica Fisher, with whom she had a polyamorous relationship.

During Season 9, Ian is sent to two years in prison, and he finds that Mickey is his new cellmate. Mickey explains to Ian that he worked as informant for the feds in exchange for picking where he gets locked up. The reunited lovers resume their relationship.

Season 10 opens with both Mickey and Ian still in jail. Having been together for nearly a year and spending all their time together, both men are beginning to get on each other's nerves. Things aren't much better when Ian is given parole, but Mickey will remain in prison. Despite that, Mickey comes to terms with it, and he stops Ian from sabotaging his parole hearing and smuggles in a phone so that Ian can talk to his new nephew, Fred. This shows that the love they feel for each other is stronger as both try to perform grand gestures toward each other to prove their devotion to one another. Mickey later attempts to escape prison but is caught by the guards. However, the warden informed him that he was scheduled for early release day anyway because of his cooperation. Unfortunately, Mickey becomes paranoid that the gang he snitched on will likely come for him. This paranoia causes Mickey to initially mistake his parole officer and some of the new occupants of the Gallagher house for the gang. Despite that, he is reunited with Ian and moves into the Gallagher house.

Mickey and Ian reach a rough patch when Ian's corrupt parole officer becomes Mickey's and dies shortly after. Both Mickey and Ian think the other did it, but it turns out they weren't the only ones with a grudge against her. The two subsequently break up after Ian's cold feet about getting married, and Mickey begins dating someone new, Byron. Ian later admits that he has insecurities about the effects his mental health can have on their relationship and how he believes Mickey deserves better instead of settling down with him. However, after Ian overhears Byron bad-mouthing all of the qualities about Mickey that Ian loves, Ian beats him up. Ian proposes to Mickey on the spot who interrupts his speech, and they get engaged.

In "Gallavich!," Ian and Mickey attempt to get married, only to have Terry burn down their wedding venue. Mickey is left homicidally angry and has to be handcuffed to be stopped from murdering Terry. Ian's friends and family come together to plan a new ceremony on short notice at a polka hall owned by an old flame of Frank's. Although Terry tries to prevent the wedding again, Ian's former Gay Jesus followers step in to keep Terry from succeeding. Ian and Mickey are married and drive off to their honeymoon in a Mercedes owned by Frank's ex Faye. However, Terry shoots up their honeymoon suite, still angry over the wedding, though neither Ian nor Mickey are hurt.

In Season 11, Mickey and Ian adjust to married life whilst dodging the usual "Gallavich" antics living with both Gallaghers and Sandy Milkovich under the same roof. He and Ian confirm their relationship to be monogamous. He has trouble finding a regular, non-criminal job after Ian urges him to get one to take care of half of the couple's bills, eventually cursing out the manager of the warehouse Ian works at and stealing recently expired boxes of food to sell at a reduced rate. He begins making money by running an armed transport service used by several legal cannabis dealers throughout the city of Chicago. Mickey and Ian eventually move out of the house and into a new condo. Ian quickly adapts, but Mickey at first struggles in the nonchaotic neighborhood they move into.

With each Gallagher sibling finding their own path and selling the family house, Mickey and Ian move on with their life after coming to terms with past trauma, such as Terry's treatment of Mickey throughout his life. Mickey is shown to be visibly upset when Terry dies. Prior to his death, Mickey frequently chided his siblings and cousins for not taking care of him, as he was incapacitated by an injury and could not feed or clothe himself. Mickey hires several home health aides for Terry before he is killed by a nun. Mickey and Ian discuss having children at the end of the series, but this is left open-ended.
