= Samantha Siddall =

British actress (born 1982)

- Born: 23 January 1982 (age 44); Reddish, Stockport, England
- Occupations: Actress; singer
- Years active: 2004–present
- Known for: Shameless

Samantha Siddall (born 23 January 1982) is an English actress, best known for playing Mandy Maguire in the comedy drama series Shameless.

== Early life ==
Siddall graduated with a performing arts degree from Salford University.

== Career ==
In 2004, Siddall was cast in the role of Mandy Maguire in the Channel 4 comedy drama series Shameless.

Siddall has previously appeared in Holby City, Bodies, Doctors, Cutting It and Jane Eyre.

In 2023, it was announced that Siddall had been cast in a new role on the soap opera Hollyoaks.

== Filmography ==
=== Television ===
| Year | Title | Role | Notes |
|---|---|---|---|
| 2004–2009, 2011 | Shameless | Mandy Maguire | Main role |
| 2005 | Cutting It | Fuchsia Gutteridge | 6 episodes |
| 2005 | Bodies | Sonia Thomas | Episode #2.7 |
| 2006 | Jane Eyre | Sarah | Episode: "Episode 1" |
| 2006 | Holby City | Rosie Weston | Episode: "Taking Liberties" |
| 2006 | Doctors | Jemma Pritchard | Episode: "The Friends of Mary Magee" |
| 2009 | Casualty | Katherine Finders | Episode: "Every Breath You Take" |
| 2011 | Casualty | Terri Carmichael | Episode: "Thanks for Today" |
| 2015 | Doctors | Sandra Benton | Episode: "Indefensible" |
| 2024 | Hollyoaks | TBA | 2 episodes |
