= Ciarán Griffiths =

British actor (born 1983)

- Born: Ciarán Joseph Griffiths; 3 March 1983 (age 43); Manchester, UK
- Occupation: Actor
- Years active: 1996–present
- Known for: Children's Ward (1996); Shameless (2007–2012); Coronation Street (2000, 2022–2024)

Ciarán Joseph Griffiths (/ˈkɪərən/ KEER-ən; born 3 March 1983) is a British actor from Manchester, England. His roles in television include Gary Best in The Bill, Mickey Maguire in Shameless and Damon Hay in Coronation Street.

== Biography ==
Griffiths was born in Manchester to a Welsh/Irish father and Irish mother, and attended St Mary's RC High Schoolbetween 1994 and 1999; it was during this time that he starred in Children's Ward at the age of thirteen.

Aside from his long-running roles in The Bill and Shameless, Griffiths has made guest appearances on Coronation Street, Clocking Off, Waterloo Road and numerous other programmes.

In 2007, Griffiths starred alongside Conrad Westmaas in the short film The Visitor. He also appeared as "Psycho" in the film There's Only One Jimmy Grimble.

He also appeared in the British vampire film Dead Cert, which was directed by Steven Lawson, and he appeared in Waterloo Road as Dylan Hodge in Series 6 in 2010–2011.

In 2016, he appeared in Vera on ITV in the episode "The Sea Glass", playing Steve Stonnall.

On New Year's Day 2018, Griffiths made a guest appearance in the BBC One soap opera EastEnders, playing Milo.

In April 2018, Griffiths appeared in All I See Is You by Katherine Smith at Octogan Theatre in Bolton. The play is inspired by real accounts of homosexual life from the 1960s. It toured nationally, and to Dublin, Sydney and Melbourne in 2019.

In 2020, Griffiths appeared in an episode of the BBC One drama Casualty as Peter Hawker, a man who had suffered a brain injury.

Griffiths, who lives in Australia, played Damon Hay in Coronation Street between December 2022 and March 2024. He previously played Dean Sykes on the soap in 2000.

== Personal life ==
In 2008, Griffiths stated in an interview with Sky Sports that although as a child he would watch Manchester City with his mum, he switched due to his friends convincing him to support Manchester United

In 2024, it was reported that Griffiths had married his girlfriend, whom he had met during a 2019 theatre tour in Australia. They have a son Ruairí & daughter Megi and reside in Australia.

== Filmography ==
Film

Year	Title	Role	Notes
2000	There's Only One Jimmy Grimble	Psycho	
2006	To the Sea Again	Jack	Short film
2007	The Visitor	Jack	Short film
2008	Clubbed	Reaper	
2008	Ace of Grace	Robbie	
2009	CGI-brows	Acolyte	Short film
2010	Just for the Record	Danny Allgen	
2010	Dead Cert	Skender	
2011	Big Fat Gypsy Gangster	Carl Thompson	
2012	Doormen	Tommo	Short film
2013	Sea View	Jason	Short film
2017	Haunted House: Exorcist	Father Patrick	Short film
2017	Rabbit Punch	Dylan	Short film

Television

Year	Title	Role	Notes
1996, 1999	Children's Ward	Jack Connor	Main role
1997–1998	Knight School	Buster Bollingbroke	2 episodes
1998–1999	City Central	Simon Mackey	4 episodes
1998	The Cops	Ian Lillie	Series 1: Episode 8
1999	Always and Everyone	Gary Manley	Episode: "Always and Everyone"
2000	Monsignor Renard	Company Runner	Series 1: Episode 1
2000	Coronation Street	Dean Sykes	Guest role; 3 episodes
2001	Emmerdale	Ben McCarthy	Guest role; 4 episodes
2001	Where the Heart Is	Carl Garton	Episode: "Temptation"
2001	Heartbeat	Vic Sands	Episode: "No Hiding Place"
2002	Stig of the Dump	Security Guard 1	Episode: "Going Home"
2002	Clocking Off	Chris Preston	Episode: "Alan's Story"
2002	At Home with the Braithwaites	Tel the Fitter	Series 3: Episode 5
2002–2005	The Bill	Gary Best	Regular role; 163 episodes
2003	Murder Investigation Team	Gary Best	Episode: "Moving Targets"
2006	The Street	Terry	Episode: "Football"
2006	Vincent	Stranger / PI	Series 2: Episode 1
2006	Blue Murder	Kevin Robertson	Episode: "In Deep"
2007	Holby City	Jem Neil	Episode: "The Borders of Sleep"
2007–2012	Shameless	Micky Maguire	Regular role; 84 episodes
2011	Waterloo Road	Dylan Hodge	Recurring role; 4 episodes
2013	Svengali	Burnsy	Television film
2013–2014	The Mill	Boon / Matthew Boon	All 10 episodes
2013	Atlantis	Cyrus	2 episodes
2014	Moving On	Kev	Episode: "Blind"
2015	This is England '90	Leon	Episode: "Winter"
2016	Vera	Steve Stonnall	Episode: "The Sea Glass"
2016	Cold Feet	Sean Westwood	Series 6: Episode 8
2018	EastEnders	Milo	2 episodes
2018–2019	Shakespeare & Hathaway: Private Investigators	Billy Porters	2 episodes
2019	The Bay	Lee Ward	2 episodes
2020	Casualty	Peter Hawker	Series 34: Episode 28
2022	Colin From Accounts	Nigel	Episode: "Bandit"
2022– 2024	Coronation Street	Damon Hay	Regular role
2022	Riptide	Michael Lane	

Video games

Year	Title	Role	Notes
2013	Ryse: Son of Rome	Additional Voices	Voice
