= Johnny Bennett =

Actor

- Born: Jonathan Kevin Bennett; 10 June 1998 (age 28); Manchester, England
- Occupation: Actor
- Years active: 2004–2011

Jonathan Kevin Bennett (born 10 June 1998) is an English actor, who played Liam Gallagher in Shameless.

He took over from Joseph Furnace from series 3 onwards and continued to play the role until series 8. He lives in Manchester but comes from an Irish family.
