= Blue cow =

Blue Cow may refer to:

- Blue Cow (cartoon), a cartoon cow who appears in both The Story Makers and Tikkabilla
- Blue Cow Mountain, a ski resort in Australia
- The Blue Cow, one of the "blue" public houses and inns in Grantham
- Belgian Blue, a breed of cattle
- Nilgai, an Indian Antelope whose name translates to "Blue Cow"
