= Dystin Johnson =

British actress and screenwriter

Dystin Johnson is a British actress and screenwriter.

She is best known for playing Norma Starkey in the Channel 4 comedy-drama series, Shameless, in a recurring role for series 1 and 3, then in the main cast for series 4–6. Following her first role in a 1993 episode of Harry, she moved on to a main cast role as Rossetti Wordsworth in series 2–4 of the CBeebies children's TV show The Story Makers, from 2002 to 2004. She has also had parts in Prime Suspect: The Final Act, EastEnders, The Bill and Holby City. She was also in the Paul Merton's Silent Clowns documentary on BBC Four as herself, in 2006. In August 2011, Johnson made a brief appearance in Coronation Street. From 2012 to 2015, Johnson played Mrs. Carter in 4 O'Clock Club on CBBC. In 2022, Johnson appeared as the character Vicki in the Netflix mockumentary sitcom Hard Cell.

Johnson has written for two episodes of the CBBC children's drama Tracy Beaker Returns and wrote 5 episodes of the CBeebies series Get Well Soon along with ex-CBeebies presenter Nicole Davis.

As of 2022 Johnson is continuing her studies at The University for the Creative Arts. Her pieces predominantly incorporate Abstract expressionism and Geometric art.
