= Michael Offei =

British actor (born 1966)

- Born: Michael Shaun Offei; 4 October 1966 (age 59); London, England
- Other name: Mick Offei
- Occupation: Actor
- Years active: 2002–present

Michael Shaun Offei (born 4 October 1966) is an English actor. He is best known for starring in the CBeebies children's television show The Story Makers, a role he took up in 2002.

== Biography ==
Michael Shaun Offei is an actor known for Hitman (2007), Casino Royale (2006) and Warrioress (2002).

== Filmography ==
=== Film ===
Year	Title	Role	Notes
2006	Casino Royale	Obanno's Lieutenant	
2007	Hitman	Jenkins	
2011	Ghosted	Ade's Mate	
2015	Warrioress	Falonex Soldier	

=== Television ===
Year	Title	Role	Notes
2002	The Story Makers	Byron Wordsworth	Main role; 46 episodes
2008	Little Big Cat	Himself	Narrator; 10 episodes
2010	ZingZillas	Zak	Voice Role; 104 episodes
