= List of The Story Makers episodes =

There are four series of The Story Makers. These are the episodes.

== Series overview ==
Series	Episodes	Originally released	
Series	Episodes	First released	Last released
1	65	11 February 2002	16 April 2002
2	61	8 July 2002	4 September 2002
3	58	25 December 2002	1 March 2003
4	82	25 January 2004	27 March 2004

== Episodes ==
=== Series 1 (2002) ===
No. overall	No. in series	Title	Directed by	Written by	Original release date
1	1	"Park"	Stephen Cannon; Simon Brown; Clare Farlow	Tracey Hammett; Dyanne White	11 February 2002
When midnight strikes in the children's library, it is time for the Story Makers to come out and create new stories ready for the children who are coming in the morning. Wordsworth: Milton; Stories: Playbook: Ruby in the Park; Blue Cow: Blue Cow in the Playground; Sniff and Wag: Sniff and Wag in the Park
2	2	"Responsibility"	Stephen Cannon; Simon Brown	Alison Ray; Dyanne White	12 February 2002
More midnight fun with Milton, Jelly and Jackson. Wordsworth: Milton; Stories: Playbook: Our dog; Tales from Faraway: The dobhiwallah's donkey; Blue Cow: Blue Cow and the roundabout horse
3	3	"Lend a Hand"	Stephen Cannon; Simon Brown	Alison Ray; Penny Lloyd	13 February 2002
Jelly is feeling very helpful. Wordsworth: Milton; Stories: Playbook: Helpful James; Kevin the Spaceman: Paper planet; Blue Cow: Blue Cow goes to the moon
4	4	"Small"	Stephen Cannon; Simon Brown; Clare Farlow	Penny Lloyd; Liz Parham; Denise McNee	14 February 2002
Milton introduces the Story Makers to his pet flea. Wordsworth: Milton; Stories: Playbook: Baby Charlotte; Blue Cow: Blue Cow and the flea; The Poons: Poon in the bin
5	5	"Homes"	Stephen Cannon; Simon Brown	Alison Ray; Amanda Gabbitas; Dyanne White	15 February 2002
Jelly and Jackson discover that not everyone lives in a house. Wordsworth: Milton; Stories: Playbook: Laura lives on a bus; Blue Cow: Blue Cow goes camping; Jack Sprat and Treacle Cat: Camping chaos
6	6	"Round The House"	Stephen Cannon; Simon Brown	Julia Myles	16 February 2002
Jelly finds out that tidying up can be fun. Wordsworth: Milton; Stories: Blue Cow: Blue Cow goes to home farm; Kevin The Spaceman: House Planet; Barnacle Rock: Gruff moves house
7	7	"Racing"	Stephen Cannon; Simon Brown	Julia Myles	17 February 2002
Jelly and Jackson discover that the fastest person doesn't always win the race. Wordsworth: Milton; Stories: Tales from Faraway: The race; Playbook: Traffic Jam; Blue Cow: Blue Cow drives a racing car
8	8	"Lucky Dip"	Stephen Cannon; Simon Brown; Clare Farlow	Penny Lloyd; Tracey Hammett; Dyanne White	18 February 2002
Something is in the mysterious box the librarian has left behind. Wordsworth: Milton; Stories: Playbook: Saranoor and the sandpit; Sniff and Wag: Pirates; Blue Cow: Blue Cow and the Blue Whale
9	9	"Tea Time"	Stephen Cannon; Simon Brown	Alison Ray; Michele Durler; Penny Lloyd; Dyanne White	19 February 2002
Someone special is coming to tea. Wordsworth: Milton; Stories: Playbook: Tianna's tea party; Kevin the Spaceman: Aliens; Blue Cow: Blue Cow and the Queen
10	10	"Swimming"	Stephen Cannon; Simon Brown; Clare Farlow	Alison Ray; Liz Parham; Denise McNee	20 February 2002
Jelly really hates water. Wordsworth: Milton; Stories: Playbook: A whole width; The Poons: The Poons go swimming; Blue Cow: Blue Cow at the Beach
11	11	"Shoe Time"	Stephen Cannon; Simon Brown	Penny Lloyd; Tracey Hammett; Denise McNee	21 February 2002
Milton gets a pair of tap-dancing shoes - and the Blue Cow does, too. Wordsworth: Milton; Stories: Playbook: Jangley bangles and spangley sandals; Blue Cow: Tap dancing Blue Cow; Tales from Faraway: The owl and the pussycat
12	12	"Getting Around"	Stephen Cannon; Simon Brown	Karen McCallum; Amanda Gabbitas; Dyanne White	22 February 2002
Milton and his friends travel by land and air. Wordsworth: Milton; Stories: Playbook: Edward's train; Jack Sprat and Treacle Cat: Rocket rat; Blue Cow: Blue Cow and the hot air balloon
13	13	"Rhymes"	Stephen Cannon; Simon Brown	Alison Ray; Tracey Hammett	23 February 2002
The episode shows what rhymes with Jelly. Wordsworth: Milton; Stories: Playbook: Ellie's Jellies; Barnacle Rock: Smelly old boot; Blue Cow: Blue Cow the bridesmaid
14	14	"Colours"	Stephen Cannon; Clare Farlow; Simon Brown	Karen McCallum; Tracey Hammett; Penny Lloyd	24 February 2002
Milton has mysterious green lips! Oh, dear! Is he feeling poorly? Wordsworth: Milton; Stories: Playbook: Footpainting; Sniff and Wag: Sliding down rainbows; Blue Cow: Blue Cow and the unicorn
15	15	"Snow Business"	Stephen Cannon; Simon Brown	Alison Ray; Penny Lloyd; Julia Myles	25 February 2002
Jackson finds out where snow comes from. Wordsworth: Milton; Stories: Playbook: Waterplay; Kevin the Spaceman: Ice; Blue Cow: Blue Cow at the ice rink
16	16	"Being Frightened"	Stephen Cannon; Simon Brown	Penny Lloyd; Julia Myles; Liz Parham; Tracey Hammett	26 February 2002
Someone has got a bad case of the squeaks. Wordsworth: Milton; Stories: Playbook: Lost in the supermarket; Blue Cow: Blue Cow goes to the dentist; The Poons: Glug under the machine
17	17	"Treasure"	Stephen Cannon; Simon Brown	Alison Ray; Kay Benbow; Denise McNee	27 February 2002
Jelly and Jackson go on a treasure hunt. Wordsworth: Milton; Stories: Playbook: Treasure in the park; Tales from Faraway: The golden crow; Blue Cow: Blue Cow and the treasure
18	18	"Grumpy"	Stephen Cannon; Simon Brown	Penny Lloyd; Martin Kerem	28 February 2002
Jelly is very grumpy today. Wordsworth: Milton; Stories: Playbook: Sam's "don't want to" day; Tales From Faraway: Raksha and the golden crow; Blue Cow: Blue Cow and the bear with the sore head
19	19	"Hot Stuff"	Stephen Cannon; Simon Brown	Karen McCallum; Tracey Hammett; Julia Myles	1 March 2002
The gang think about some of the hottest places in the world. Wordsworth: Milton; Stories: Playbook: Pernia's party; Jack Sprat and Treacle Cat: Summer in the city; Blue Cow: Blue Cow in the desert
20	20	"Shiny"	Stephen Cannon; Simon Brown	Karen McCallum; Tracey Hammett; Denise McNee	2 March 2002
Milton and his friends make some shiny stories. Wordsworth: Milton; Stories: Playbook: Shiny things; Barnacle Rock: Double trouble; Blue Cow: Blue Cow and the aliens
21	21	"Festivals"	Stephen Cannon; Simon Brown	Penny Lloyd; Tracey Hammett; Denise McNee	3 March 2002
Jelly finds out about a special festival for brothers and sisters. Wordsworth: Milton; Stories: Playbook: Raksha Bandhan; Blue Cow: Blue Cow goes to India; Sniff and Wag: Frisky Witch
22	22	"Exploring"	Stephen Cannon; Simon Brown	Penny Lloyd; Michele Durler	4 March 2002
Jelly and Jackson find a secret message. Wordsworth: Milton; Stories: Playbook: Explorers; Blue Cow: Blue Cow and Mount Everest; Kevin the Spaceman: Planet Custard
23	23	"Growing"	Stephen Cannon; Simon Brown; Clare Farlow	Alison Ray; Liz Parham	5 March 2002
Milton and his friends make stories about growing. Wordsworth: Milton; Stories: Playbook: Jessie's cress; The Poons: Too hot for Geranium; Blue Cow: Blue Cow and the windmill
24	24	"Travel"	Stephen Cannon; Simon Brown	Dyanne White	6 March 2002
Milton and his friends make stories from around the world. Wordsworth: Milton; Stories: Tales from Faraway: Arjuna and Cakil; Playbook: Indian dance class; Blue Cow: Blue Cow goes to Australia
25	25	"Vegetables"	Stephen Cannon; Simon Brown	Amanda Gabbitas	7 March 2002
Milton has some broccoli to eat. Wordsworth: Milton; Stories: Playbook: Theo's allotment; Jack Sprat and Treacle Cat: Circus Skills; Blue Cow: Blue Cow goes to a restaurant
26	26	"Eye Spy"	Stephen Cannon; Simon Brown	Alison Ray; Tracey Hammett; Dyanne White	8 March 2002
Jelly thinks that she had found an eye on a stick. Wordsworth: Milton; Stories: Playbook: Ben's new glasses; Barnacle Rock: Giant sea snakes and nasty monsters; Blue Cow: Blue Cow and the peacock
27	27	"Monsters"	Stephen Cannon; Simon Brown	Alison Ray; Anne Gilchrist; Penny Lloyd; Dyanne White	9 March 2002
Milton finds a monster in the library. Wordsworth: Milton; Stories: Playbook: The sandmonster; Tales from Faraway: The crocodile and the monkey; Blue Cow: Blue Cow and the giant
28	28	"Stars"	Stephen Cannon; Simon Brown	Alison Ray; Tracey Hammett	10 March 2002
Jelly and Jackson wonder why some stars are brighter than others, and soon find the answer. Wordsworth: Milton; Stories: Playbook: Star in the garden; Sniff and Wag: Moon kites; Blue Cow: Blue Cow and the Milky Way
29	29	"Pets"	Stephen Cannon; Simon Brown	Karen McCallum; Penny Lloyd; Denise McNee	11 March 2002
Jackson has a pet that only he can see. Wordsworth: Milton; Stories: Playbook: Hamish and Stanley the household cat; Kevin the Spaceman: Purr; Blue Cow: Blue Cow and the pet shop
30	30	"Party Time"	Stephen Cannon; Simon Brown; Clare Farlow	Alison Ray; Michele Durler; Liz Parham; Denise McNee	12 March 2002
Jelly and Jackson plan a surprise for Milton. Wordsworth: Milton; Stories: Playbook: Safina's Shoes; The Poons: Poon's Birthday; Blue Cow: Blue Cow and the dinosaur
31	31	"Holidays"	Stephen Cannon; Simon Brown	Karen McCallum	13 March 2002
Jelly and Jackson play holiday games. Wordsworth: Milton; Stories: Playbook: Chloe stays at a hotel; Tales from Faraway: Gatocaca; Blue Cow: Blue Cow and the great wall of China
32	32	"Water Kings"	Stephen Cannon; Simon Brown	Alison Ray; Amanda Gabbitas; Julia Myles	14 March 2002
Milton and friends meet the water kings. Wordsworth: Milton; Stories: Playbook: The water kings; Jack Sprat and Treacle Cat: It's raining it's pouring; Blue Cow: Blue Cow under the sea
33	33	"Grandparents"	Stephen Cannon; Simon Brown	Alison Ray; Tracey Hammett; Denise McNee	15 March 2002
Jackson wants to try and meet the oldest man in the world. Wordsworth: Milton; Stories: Playbook: Grandma's birthday; Barnacle Rock: A gnashing adventure; Blue Cow: Blue Cow and the oldest man in the world
34	34	"Alarm Bells"	Stephen Cannon; Simon Brown	Penny Lloyd; Denise McNee	16 March 2002
Today, Milton forgets to set his alarm clock. Wordsworth: Milton; Stories: Blue Cow: Blue Cow and the time machine; Playbook: Baby Charlotte; Kevin the Spaceman: Tick tock
35	35	"Snakes Alive"	Stephen Cannon; Simon Brown	Denise McNee	17 March 2002
The episode shows where the librarian was today. Wordsworth: Milton; Stories: Playbook: Face painting; Tales from Faraway: Saraswati; Blue Cow: Blue Cow and the magic carpet
36	36	"Animals"	Stephen Cannon; Simon Brown; Clare Farlow	Alison Ray; Tracey Hammett; Dyanne White	18 March 2002
Milton makes some very strange noises today. Wordsworth: Milton; Stories: Playbook: Park animals; Sniff and Wag: The firequacker balloon; Blue Cow: Blue Cow goes to the circus
37	37	"Unwell"	Stephen Cannon; Simon Brown; Clare Farlow	Alison Ray; Liz Parham; Denise McNee	19 March 2002
Poor Jelly feels ill. Wordsworth: Milton; Stories: Playbook: Super sandwich; The Poons: The Poons are ill; Blue Cow: Blue Cow gets chicken pox
38	38	"Jewels"	Stephen Cannon; Simon Brown; Clare Farlow	Alison Ray; Dyanne White	20 March 2002
Jelly wants to have some beautiful jewels. Wordsworth: Milton; Stories: Playbook: Kings and Queens; Tales from Faraway: The King's belt; Blue Cow: Blue Cow goes to Hawaii
39	39	"Hot and Cold"	Stephen Cannon; Simon Brown	Karen McCallum; Michele Durler; Amanda Gabbitas; Martin Kerem	21 March 2002
Milton and friends make hot and cold stories. Wordsworth: Milton; Stories: Playbook: My dad's a fireman; Jack Sprat and Treacle Cat: The big freeze; Blue Cow: Blue Cow at the North Pole
40	40	"Hair Today"	Stephen Cannon; Simon Brown	Karen McCallum; Tracey Hammett; Martin Kerem	22 March 2002
Milton experiments with his hairstyle. Wordsworth: Milton; Stories: Playbook: My dad the hairdresser; Barnacle Rock: Hairy scary fish; Blue Cow: Blue Cow and the Yeti
41	41	"Fun and Games"	Stephen Cannon; Simon Brown	Alison Ray; Tracey Hammett; Denise McNee	23 March 2002
The gang face a creative block when they run out of ideas for new stories. Wordsworth: Milton; Stories: Playbook: The pier; Sniff and Wag: Travelling fair; Blue Cow: Blue Cow and the magic wand
42	42	"The Unknown"	Stephen Cannon; Simon Brown	Penny Lloyd; Julia Myles; Denise McNee	24 March 2002
The Story Makers wonder what to do during a power cut. Wordsworth: Milton; Stories: Blue Cow: Blue Cow and the shadow; Kevin the Spaceman: The dark side; Playbook: The school gates
43	43	"Exercise"	Stephen Cannon; Simon Brown; Clare Farlow	Karen McCallum; Liz Parham	25 March 2002
Jelly and Jackson are getting fit. Wordsworth: Milton; Stories: Playbook: Dancing; The Poons: Keep fit Pop; Blue Cow: Blue Cow at the Olympics
44	44	"Exotic Animals"	Stephen Cannon; Simon Brown	Karen McCallum	26 March 2002
More midnight fun with Milton, Jelly and Jackson. Wordsworth: Milton; Stories: Tales from Faraway: King of the forest; Playbook: Orson and Esme go to the zoo; Blue Cow: Blue Cow in the jungle
45	45	"Best Day Ever"	Stephen Cannon; Simon Brown; Clare Farlow	Alison Ray; Amanda Gabbitas; Dyanne White	27 March 2002
Milton and his friends try to think of their best day ever. Wordsworth: Milton; Stories: Playbook: Park visit; Jack Sprat and Treacle Cat: Birthday surprise; Blue Cow: Blue Cow goes to the fair
46	46	"Bubbles"	Stephen Cannon; Simon Brown	Alison Ray; Kay Benbow; Tracey Hammett; Denise McNee	28 March 2002
There is a lot of washing taking place in the library today. Wordsworth: Milton; Stories: Playbook: Washing the car; Barnacle Rock: Lovely bubbly; Blue Cow: Blue Cow's bubble bath
47	47	"Boogie"	Stephen Cannon; Simon Brown	Penny Lloyd; Tracey Hammett; Denise McNee	21 February 2002
Milton gets some dancing - and the Blue Cow does, too. Wordsworth: Milton; Stories: Blue Cow: Boogie Blue Cow; Playbook: Line dancing; Tales from Faraway: The Three Little Pigs
47	47	"Seasons"	Stephen Cannon; Simon Brown	Karen McCallum; Tracey Hammett; Dyanne White	29 March 2002
At midnight in the library, the Story Makers come out and create new stories. Wordsworth: Milton; Stories: Playbook: Flower soup; Sniff and Wag: Snow dog; Blue Cow: Blue Cow and the giant marrow
48	48	"Flying"	Stephen Cannon; Simon Brown	Alison Ray; Julia Myles; Penny Lloyd	30 March 2002
There is a lot of flying taking place in the library today. Kevin the Spaceman discovers a very bouncy planet. Wordsworth: Milton; Stories: Playbook: The birthday swing; Kevin the Spaceman: Bounce; Blue Cow: Blue Cow goes flying
49	49	"Bits and Pieces"	Stephen Cannon; Simon Brown; Clare Farlow	Karen McCallum; Penny Lloyd; Liz Parham; Denise McNee	31 March 2002
Jelly and Jackson are feeling very artistic. Wordsworth: Milton; Stories: Playbook: Playdough; The Poons: Poon's surprise; Blue Cow: Blue Cow in the china shop
50	50	"Berries and Beans"	Stephen Cannon; Simon Brown	Alison Ray; Julia Myles; Denise McNee	1 April 2002
Jelly and Jackson find out where strawberries come from. Wordsworth: Milton; Stories: Playbook: Strawberries; Blue Cow: Blue Cow and the beanstalk; Tales from Faraway: Robin the bobbin
51	51	"Mess"	Stephen Cannon; Simon Brown	Alison Ray; Amanda Gabbitas	2 April 2002
Jelly and Jackson are supposed to tidy up, but there is no time. Wordsworth: Milton; Stories: Playbook: Messy Ben; Jack Sprat and Treacle Cat: Windy weather; Blue Cow: Blue Cow and the blobs
52	52	"Dressing Up"	Stephen Cannon; Simon Brown; Clare Farlow	Alison Ray; Tracey Hammett; Dyanne White	3 April 2002
Jackson and Jelly dress up as a pirate and a princess. Wordsworth: Milton; Stories: Playbook: Tilly's dressing up day; Blue Cow: Blue Cow becomes a model; Barnacle Rock: The helmet crab
53	53	"Puppets"	Stephen Cannon; Simon Brown	Penny Lloyd	4 April 2002
Jackson turns Jelly into a robot. Wordsworth: Milton; Stories: Playbook: My mum the puppeteer; Tales from Faraway: Halus and Kasar; Blue Cow: Blue Cow and the robot
54	54	"Underwater"	Stephen Cannon; Simon Brown	Karen McCallum; Tracey Hammett; Julia Myles	5 April 2002
A look at underwater creatures. Wordsworth: Milton; Stories: Playbook: Aquarium; Sniff and Wag: Under The Sea; Blue Cow: Blue Cow goes swimming
55	55	"Prints"	Stephen Cannon; Simon Brown	Alison Ray; Tracey Hammett; Penny Lloyd; Dyanne White	6 April 2002
Someone has left strange prints in the library. Wordsworth: Milton; Stories: Playbook: Ania's dog show; Kevin the Spaceman: Woof; Blue Cow: Blue Cow and the detective
56	56	"Cake"	Stephen Cannon; Simon Brown; Clare Farlow	Tracey Hammett; Liz Parham; Julia Myles	7 April 2002
The librarian has left her lunchbox behind and there is something in it. Wordsworth: Milton; Stories: Playbook: Baking a Cake; The Poons: Party Time; Blue Cow: Blue Cow and the biscuit tin
57	57	"Up and Down"	Stephen Cannon; Simon Brown	Alison Ray; Julia Myles; Denise McNee	8 April 2002
Milton and his friends are going up and down. Wordsworth: Milton; Stories: Playbook: Theme park; Tales from Faraway: The horse and the jockey; Blue Cow: Blue Cow goes skiing
58	58	"Football"	Stephen Cannon; Simon Brown	Alison Ray; Amanda Gabbitas; Tracey Hammett	9 April 2002
Jackson suffers from football fever. Wordsworth: Milton; Stories: Playbook: Grace and Jessie's week; Jack Sprat and Treacle Cat: Football crazy; Blue Cow: Blue Cow scores at Wembley
59	59	"Music"	Stephen Cannon; Simon Brown	Alison Ray; Tracey Hammett	10 April 2002
Jackson wants to learn to play the keyboard. Wordsworth: Milton; Stories: Playbook: Indian dance class; Blue Cow: Blue Cow learns to dance; Barnacle Rock: Karaoke
61	61	"Photos"	Stephen Cannon; Simon Brown	Alison Ray; Julia Myles; Denise McNee	1 April 2002
Jelly and Jackson find out where photos taking. Wordsworth: Milton; Stories: Tales from Faraway: Goldilocks And The Three Bears; The Poons: Poon's Camera; Jack Sprat and Treacle Cat: Jack Sprat's Photographs
61	61	"Rubber Ducks"	Stephen Cannon; Simon Brown; Clare Farlow	Karen McCallum; Penny Lloyd; Liz Parham; Denise McNee	31 March 2002
Jelly and Jackson are feeling very good. Wordsworth: Milton; Stories: Playbook: The Quack Quack Duck Song; Blue Cow: Blue Cow in the bathroom; The Poons: Poon's Rubber Ducks
62	62	"Basketball"	Stephen Cannon; Simon Brown	Alison Ray; Amanda Gabbitas; Tracey Hammett	9 April 2002
Jackson suffers from Basketball fever. Wordsworth: Milton; Stories: Playbook: Grace and Jessie's Football; Blue Cow: Blue Cow Learns To Play Baseball; Jack Sprat and Treacle Cat: Basketball crazy
60	60	"Toys"	Stephen Cannon; Clare Farlow; Simon Brown	Alison Ray; Tracey Hammett; Michele Durler	11 April 2002
Jelly puts her teddy in the Story Machine. Wordsworth: Milton; Stories: Playbook: Where's bear?; Sniff and Wag: Shiny brass tubes; Blue Cow: Blue Cow and the kite
61	61	"Family"	Stephen Cannon; Simon Brown	Alison Ray; Tracey Hammett; Penny Lloyd	12 April 2002
Milton makes stories about families. Wordsworth: Milton; Stories: Playbook: Tickle my whiskers; Kevin the Spaceman: Mummy; Blue Cow: Blue Cow learns to sing
62	62	"Missing"	Stephen Cannon; Simon Brown; Clare Farlow	Alison Ray; Liz Parham	13 April 2002
Milton has lost something very important. Wordsworth: Milton; Stories: Playbook: The sock story; The Poons: Where's Auntie Porridge; Blue Cow: Blue Cow goes to Egypt
63	63	"Boats"	Stephen Cannon; Simon Brown	Penny Lloyd; Dyanne White; Hilary Waters	14 April 2002
Milton and his friends are in the mood for some sailing. Wordsworth: Milton; Stories: Blue Cow: Blue Cow goes boating; Playbook: Robin and India's houseboat; Tales from Faraway: The monkey's heart
64	64	"Carnival"	Stephen Cannon; Clare Farlow; Simon Brown	Alison Ray; Amanda Gabbitas	15 April 2002
Jelly and Jackson find out what happens at a carnival. Wordsworth: Milton; Stories: Playbook: Bobbles, bands and butterflies; Jack Sprat and Treacle Cat: Carnival time; Blue Cow: Blue Cow at the carnival
65	65	"Matching"	Stephen Cannon; Simon Brown	Karen McCallum; Tracey Hammett	16 April 2002
Milton's shoes don't match. Wordsworth: Milton; Stories: Playbook: Sisters; Barnacle Rock: Puffy love; Blue Cow: Blue Cow and blue sheep

=== Series 2 (2002) ===
No. overall	No. in series	Title	Directed by	Written by	Original release date
66	1	"Noises"	Helen Church; Stephen Cannon	Karen McCallum; Denise McNee	8 July 2002
Jackson dreams about becoming a drummer, but Byron has other ideas. Wordsworth: Byron; Stories: Playbook: The best band in the land; Rainforest Tales: Greedy Snake; Blue Cow: Tap dancing Blue Cow
67	2	"Farm"	Stephen Cannon; Helen Church	Penny Lloyd; Tracey Hammett	9 July 2002
Jackson gets some new wellies and the gang visit a farm. Wordsworth: Shelley; Stories: Playbook: I love my wellingtons; Kevin the Spaceman: The woolly planet; Blue Cow: Blue Cow and the roundabout horse
68	3	"Names"	Tony Reed; Stephen Cannon	Penny Lloyd; Tracey Hammett	10 July 2002
Rossetti makes some name badges and Blue Cow becomes a popstar. Wordsworth: Rossetti; Stories: Playbook: Ellie's Jellies; Barnacle Rock: Lovely bubbly; Blue Cow: Blue Cow the pop star
69	4	"Dinosaurs"	Helen Church; Stephen Cannon	Karen McCallum; Tracey Hammett; Denise McNee	11 July 2002
Jelly and Jackson find out about dinosaurs. Wordsworth: Byron; Stories: Playbook: What can it be?; Sniff and Wag: The Idontknowhatarus; Blue Cow: Blue Cow and the dinosaurs
70	5	"Creepy Crawlies"	Stephen Cannon	Tracey Hammett; Karen McCallum; Dyanne White	12 July 2002
It is a creepy-crawlies night in the library. Wordsworth: Shelley; Stories: Playbook: If I were an ant; Rainforest Tales: Cheer up Froggy; Blue Cow: Blue Cow and the spider
76	11	"Carpets"	Stephen Cannon	Tracey Hammett; Karen McCallum; Dyanne White	17 July 2002
Someone has taken Jelly's carpet. Wordsworth: Blake; Stories: Blue Cow: Blue Cow and the magic carpet; Playbook: Sam's "check up" day; Rainforest Tales: Sneaky Snake's leaf
71	6	"Holes"	Tony Reed; Helen Church	Penny Lloyd; Tracey Hammett; Dyanne White	13 July 2002
Rossetti has a magic spyhole and is looking for Story Makers. Wordsworth: Rossetti; Stories: Playbook: Holey pasta; Kevin the Spaceman: Aliens; Blue Cow: Blue Cow underground
72	7	"Out of Sorts"	Tony Reed; Stephen Cannon	Julia Myles; Karen McCallum; Simon Brown	14 July 2002
Jackson doesn't feel like making stories. Wordsworth: Rossetti; Stories: Playbook: Raksha Bandan; Rainforest Tales: Rainforest party; Blue Cow: Blue Cow and the handkerchief
73	8	"Doctors"	Stephen Cannon; Helen Church	Karen McCallum; Tracey Hammett; Simon Brown	15 July 2002
Jelly and Jackson are playing doctors and nurses. Wordsworth: Shelley; Stories: Playbook: Nurse Hannah and Doctor Louisa; Barnacle Rock: The tentacly eel; Blue Cow: Blue Cow goes to hospital
74	9	"Can We Fix It?"	Helen Church; Stephen Cannon	Tracey Hammett; Dyanne White	7 September 2002
Jelly and Jackson decide to fix some objects with some tools. Wordsworth: Byron; Stories: Playbook: Morgan mends the car; Blue Cow: Blue Cow meets Humpty Dumpty; Sniff and Wag: Moon kites
75	10	"What's It Made Of?"	Tony Reed; Helen Church	Penny Lloyd; Denise McNee	16 July 2002
Jackson discovers beansprouts, and Kevin the Spaceman discovers a planet made from cheese. Wordsworth: Rossetti; Stories: Playbook: Darryl's pancake rolls; Kevin the Spaceman: Is it cheese?; Blue Cow: Blue Cow goes skiing
76	11	"Fibs"	Stephen Cannon	Tracey Hammett; Karen McCallum; Dyanne White	17 July 2002
Someone has taken Jelly's teddy. Wordsworth: Shelley; Stories: Playbook: Sam's "don't want to" day; Rainforest Tales: Sneaky Snake's trick; Blue Cow: Blue Cow and the cheeky monkey
77	12	"Telephone"	Tony Reed; Helen Church	Penny Lloyd; Caroline Johns; Tracey Hammett; Julia Myles	18 July 2002
Byron's mobile phone is getting in the way of making stories. Wordsworth: Byron; Stories: Playbook: The 1 o'clock club; Barnacle Rock: The oogly googly fing; Blue Cow: Blue Cow and the racing car
78	13	"Copycats"	Tony Reed; Stephen Cannon	Penny Lloyd; Tracey Hammett; Simon Brown	19 July 2002
The episode asks the question of whether it is possible to copy a man in a suit. Wordsworth: Byron; Stories: Playbook: Copycats; Barnacle Rock: Double trouble; Blue Cow: Blue Cow and the echo
79	14	"Balls"	Stephen Cannon	Karen McCallum; Tracey Hammett	20 July 2002
Jelly and Shelley go bowling. Wordsworth: Shelley; Stories: Playbook: Time for a strike; Sniff and Wag: The egg and spoon race; Blue Cow: Marbles
80	15	"Journey"	Tony Reed; Stephen Cannon; Helen Church	Karen McCallum; Tracey Hammett	21 July 2002
Rossetti has trouble with the traffic. Wordsworth: Rossetti; Stories: Playbook: Traffic Jam; Barnacle Rock: The spindly spinner fish; Blue Cow: Blue Cow and the lollipop lady
81	16	"Rhythm"	Helen Church; Stephen Cannon	Tracey Hammett; Dyanne White	22 July 2002
Byron demonstrates that he has rhythm. Wordsworth: Byron; Stories: Playbook: We've got rhythm; Sniff and Wag: Rickety rackety toot toot; Blue Cow: Blue Cow goes to the fair
82	17	"Shapes"	Stephen Cannon; Tony Reed; Helen Church	Karen McCallum; Penny Lloyd	23 July 2002
Jelly and Jackson find shapes all over the place. Wordsworth: Shelley; Stories: Playbook: Flying kites; Kevin the Spaceman: Planet Shape Sorter; Blue Cow: Blue Cow and the pyramids
83	18	"Water"	Tony Reed; Stephen Cannon	Penny Lloyd; Karen McCallum; Denise McNee	24 July 2002
Rossetti's bike has got a flat tyre. Wordsworth: Rossetti; Stories: Playbook: The water kings; Rainforest Tales: Thirsty Bird; Blue Cow: Blue Cow underwater
84	19	"Special Occasions"	Stephen Cannon	Tracey Hammett; Simon Brown	25 July 2002
Webster demonstrates his juggling skills on a special day. Wordsworth: Webster; Stories: Playbook: Sports day; Sniff and Wag: Sniff and Wag at the fair; Blue Cow: Blue Cow at the amusement park
85	20	"Best Friends"	Stephen Cannon	Tracey Hammett; Denise McNee	26 July 2002
The episode shows who is going to be Shelley's best friend. Wordsworth: Shelley; Stories: Playbook: Together; Sniff and Wag: Sniff and Wag in the park; Blue Cow: Blue Cow's new friend
86	21	"Going to School"	Tony Reed; Helen Church	Karen McCallum; Tracey Hammett; Julia Myles	27 July 2002
Jelly and Jackson wonder what it would be like to go to school. Wordsworth: Rossetti; Stories: Playbook: The school gates; Barnacle Rock: Who's for lunch?; Blue Cow: Blue Cow goes to nursery
87	22	"Picnic"	Tony Reed; Stephen Cannon	Karen McCallum; Michele Durler; Denise McNee	28 July 2002
Jelly and Jackson want to have a picnic in the library. Wordsworth: Byron; Stories: Playbook: Tianna's tea party; Rainforest Tales: Proud Bird's soup; Blue Cow: Blue Cow and the spaghetti
88	23	"Nonsense"	Stephen Cannon	Tracey Hammett	29 July 2002
It is silly billy boo night in the library. Wordsworth: Shelley; Stories: Playbook: The Weeooliplop; Sniff and Wag: The good ship Litter Bin; Blue Cow: Blue Cow and the robot
89	24	"Opposites"	Tony Reed; Stephen Cannon; Helen Church	Tracey Hammett; Penny Lloyd; Dyanne White	30 July 2002
Rossetti is feeling sleepy, but Jelly and Jackson are wide awake. Wordsworth: Rossetti; Stories: Playbook: Opposites; Kevin the Spaceman: Planet Opposite; Blue Cow: Blue Cow and the giant
90	25	"Knights"	Helen Church; Tony Reed; Stephen Cannon	Tracey Hammett; Karen McCallum; Simon Brown	31 July 2002
Sarah and Kate have a castle adventures in the rainforest. Snake helps monkey and bird to see who is the best and Blue Cow meets a dragon. Wordsworth: Byron; Stories: Playbook: Sarah and Kate's castle adventure; Rainforest Tales: Clever Snake; Blue Cow: Blue Cow and the dragon
91	26	"Ships"	Stephen Cannon; Helen Church	Tracey Hammett; Dyanne White	1 August 2002
Jelly and Jackson jump aboard the good ship Story Maker. Wordsworth: Webster; Stories: Playbook: Robin and India's houseboat; Barnacle Rock: Gruff moves house; Blue Cow: Blue Cow and the lighthouse
92	27	"Time"	Tony Reed; Stephen Cannon	Karen McCallum; Penny Lloyd; Julia Myles	2 August 2002
Byron helps Jackson to tell the time, Milly boils an egg, and Kevin the Spaceman discovers an alarm clock. Wordsworth: Byron; Stories: Playbook: Millie and her boiling egg; Kevin the Spaceman: Tick tock; Blue Cow: Blue Cow on time
93	28	"Fingers and Toes"	Tony Reed; Helen Church; Stephen Cannon	Penny Lloyd; Tracey Hammett; Simon Brown	3 August 2002
Jelly wants to do some finger-painting, but Rossetti has other ideas. Wordsworth: Rossetti; Stories: Playbook: Bottles of colour; Sniff and Wag: Under the sea; Blue Cow: Juggling Blue Cow
94	29	"Balloons"	Stephen Cannon; Helen Church	Tracey Hammett; Dyanne White	4 August 2002
Someone has left some beautiful balloons in the library. Wordsworth: Shelley; Stories: Playbook: Balloons; Barnacle Rock: The beautiful ball fish; Blue Cow: Blue Cow and the hot air balloon
95	30	"Fractions"	Tony Reed	Karen McCallum; Caroline Johns; Simon Brown	5 August 2002
It is midnight and everyone's hungry, which is the perfect time for a midnight feast. Wordsworth: Byron; Stories: Playbook: Making pizza; Blue Cow: Blue Cow and the missing half; Kevin the Spaceman: The dark side
96	31	"Favourite Things"	Tony Reed; Helen Church; Stephen Cannon	Penny Lloyd; Karen McCallum; Dyanne White	6 August 2002
Everyone is doing their favourite thing in the library today. Wordsworth: Rossetti; Stories: Rainforest Tales: Cheeky Monkey's favourite food; Playbook: Henry's train; Blue Cow: Blue Cow and the bubble bath
97	32	"Sticky"	Stephen Cannon; Helen Church	Penny Lloyd; Tracey Hammett; Denise McNee	7 August 2002
Everyone is getting very stuck up in the library today. Wordsworth: Shelley; Stories: Playbook: Messy Ben; Barnacle Rock: Honey I'm stuck; Blue Cow: Sticky Blue Cow
98	33	"Lonely"	Stephen Cannon	Tracey Hammett; Effua Daniels; Karen McCallum	8 August 2002
Jackson is feeling rather lonely. Wordsworth: Webster; Stories: Playbook: Lonely; Rainforest Tales: Snake! Snake!; Blue Cow: Blue Cow under the sea
99	34	"Putting on a Show"	Tony Reed; Stephen Cannon	Tracey Hammett; Denise McNee	9 August 2002
Rossetti, Jelly and Jackson put on a show in the library. Wordsworth: Rossetti; Stories: Playbook: Jangley bangles; Blue Cow: Blue Cow goes to the pantomime; Sniff and Wag: Sniff and Wag and the flower show
100	35	"Green"	Stephen Cannon; Helen Church	Karen McCallum; Penny Lloyd; Denise McNee	10 August 2002
Jelly and Jackson find out what happens when yellow and blue paints are mixed. Wordsworth: Shelley; Stories: Playbook: Park Visit; Kevin the Spaceman: The very green planet; Blue Cow: Blue Cow and the aliens
101	36	"Measuring"	Tony Reed; Helen Church	Karen McCallum; Tracey Hammett; Denise McNee	11 August 2002
The children in the library have been finding out about measuring and Jelly and Jackson want to find out too. Wordsworth: Byron; Stories: Playbook: Flower soup; Barnacle Rock: The swingy upsy downy story; Blue Cow: Blue Cow and the decorator
102	37	"Different"	Tony Reed; Stephen Cannon	Penny Lloyd; Karen McCallum; Simon Brown	12 August 2002
Jelly and Jackson play spot the difference. Wordsworth: Rossetti; Stories: Playbook: Laura lives on a bus; Rainforest Tales: Proud Bird's secret; Blue Cow: Blue Cow and a boy called Titch
103	38	"Hide and Seek"	Stephen Cannon; Helen Church	Penny Lloyd; Tracey Hammett; Denise McNee	13 August 2002
Jelly and Jackson want to play hide-and-seek. Wordsworth: Shelley; Stories: Blue Cow: Blue Cow and the cake; Playbook: Hide and seek; Sniff and Wag: Pirates
104	39	"Teeth"	Helen Church; Stephen Cannon	Tracey Hammett; Dyanne White	14 August 2002
Byron tells Jelly and Jackson how he gets such a twinkly smile. Wordsworth: Byron; Stories: Playbook: Cameron, Cameron; Blue Cow: Blue Cow and the crocodile; Barnacle Rock: A gnashing adventure
105	40	"Mythical Creatures"	Stephen Cannon; Helen Church	Tracey Hammett; Caroline Johns	15 August 2002
Jelly wants to be a fairy but Jackson thinks she is a leprechaun. Wordsworth: Webster; Stories: Playbook: Fairies; Sniff and Wag: Sniff and Wag and the leprechaun; Blue Cow: Blue Cow and the unicorn
106	41	"Angry"	Stephen Cannon; Helen Church	Tracey Hammett; Simon Brown	16 August 2002
Everyone is rather angry in the library today. Wordsworth: Shelley; Stories: Playbook: Angry; Barnacle Rock: Puffy love; Blue Cow: Film star Blue Cow
107	42	"Sorting"	Helen Church; Stephen Cannon	Karen McCallum; Tracey Hammett; Simon Brown	17 August 2002
Jelly and Jackson are getting things sorted out. Wordsworth: Byron; Stories: Playbook: Theo's allotment; Sniff and Wag: Bonkers conkers and slithery stones; Blue Cow: Blue Cow and the cowboy
108	43	"Family"	Tony Reed; Helen Church; Stephen Cannon	Tracey Hammett; Penny Lloyd; Simon Brown	18 August 2002
Jelly and Jackson want to have a sleepover with Grandma. Wordsworth: Rossetti; Stories: Playbook: Grandad's Yard; Kevin the Spaceman: Mummy; Blue Cow: Blue Cow and the ants
109	44	"Nursery Rhymes"	Stephen Cannon	Tracey Hammett	19 August 2002
Shelley has some very exciting surprise parcels for Jelly and Jackson. Wordsworth: Shelley; Stories: Playbook: This is the; Blue Cow: Blue Cow and the nursery rhyme; Barnacle Rock: Karaoke
116	51	"Panic"	Tony Reed; Stephen Cannon	Penny Lloyd; Karen McCallum; Dyanne White	25 August 2002
Jelly and Jackson wonder why Blake has a big key in his back. Wordsworth: Blake; Stories: Rainforest Tales: The rainforest Bubbles; Kevin The Spaceman: Planet Chill-man; Barnacle Rock: The boinging upsy downy story
110	45	"Spots and Dots"	Tony Reed; Stephen Cannon; Helen Church	Tracey Hammett; Penny Lloyd	20 August 2002
Everyone is a bit dotty in the library tonight. Wordsworth: Byron; Stories: Playbook: Tea for Lady Two Spot; Kevin the Spaceman: Spotty Planet; Blue Cow: Blue Cow learns to sing
111	46	"Patterns"	Tony Reed; Stephen Cannon	Tracey Hammett; Penny Lloyd; Julia Myles	21 August 2002
Jackson finds a kaleidoscope, and Jelly uses a stinky onion to make a pattern for Jackson. Wordsworth: Rossetti; Stories: Playbook: Patterns; Sniff and Wag: Madame Tricksy; Blue Cow: Blue Cow goes swimming
112	47	"Lots of"	Stephen Cannon	Tracey Hammett; Karen McCallum	21 August 2002
Jackson finds it hard to count when Jelly keeps interrupting him. Wordsworth: Webster; Stories: Playbook: Aquarium; Rainforest Tales: The tree of life; Blue Cow: Magical Blue Cow
113	48	"Yo-Yo"	Helen Church	Effua Daniels; Tracey Hammett; Denise McNee	22 August 2002
Jackson has found a mysterious round object called a yo-yo. Wordsworth: Byron; Stories: Playbook: Up and down; Barnacle Rock: The Jacketybox; Blue Cow: Blue Cow and the beanstalk
114	49	"Fasteners"	Tony Reed; Stephen Cannon; Helen Church	Penny Lloyd	23 August 2002
The librarian has left something interesting behind. Wordsworth: Rossetti; Stories: Kevin the Spaceman: Planet Buttons; Playbook: Fasteners; Blue Cow: Blue Cow and the Milky Way
115	50	"Jumping"	Stephen Cannon; Helen Church	Penny Lloyd	24 August 2002
Jelly learns to jump with a little help from Shelley. Wordsworth: Shelley; Stories: Playbook: Ready to jump; Kevin the Spaceman: Bounce; Blue Cow: Blue Cow and the racehorse
116	51	"Slow"	Tony Reed; Stephen Cannon	Penny Lloyd; Karen McCallum; Dyanne White	25 August 2002
Jelly and Jackson wonder why Byron has a big key in his back. Wordsworth: Byron; Stories: Rainforest Tales: The rainforest race; Blue Cow: Blue Cow and the snail; Playbook: Jessie's cress
74	9	"Choo Choo"	Helen Church; Stephen Cannon	Tracey Hammett; Dyanne White	7 September 2002
Jelly and Jackson decide to see the trains. Wordsworth: Blake; Stories: Playbook: Cheesemaking; Blue Cow: Blue Cow and the train; Sniff and Wag: The leaf chase
117	52	"Texture"	Tony Reed; Helen Church	Karen McCallum; Tracey Hammett; Penny Lloyd; Martin Kerem	26 August 2002
Rossetti and Jelly make a 'feely' picture. Wordsworth: Rossetti; Stories: Playbook: Busy fingers; Kevin the Spaceman: Spiky planet; Blue Cow: Blue Cow and the Yeti
118	53	"Dreams"	Stephen Cannon	Tracey Hammett; Simon Brown	26 August 2002
Shelley loves dreaming because she can do or be anything that she wants. Wordsworth: Shelley; Stories: Playbook: The dream catcher; Sniff and Wag: Snow dog; Blue Cow: Blue Cow and the comfiest bed in the world
119	54	"First Time"	Stephen Cannon	Tracey Hammett; Karen McCallum	28 August 2002
Webster has received an interesting book parcel. Wordsworth: Webster; Stories: Playbook: A whole width; Rainforest Tales: Cheeky Monkey's new suit; Blue Cow: Blue Cow and the hatchling
120	55	"Clothes"	Tony Reed; Helen Church	Penny Lloyd; Michele Durler; Tracey Hammett; Dyanne White	29 August 2002
Jelly and Jackson find some clothes in the dressing up box and decide to be pirates. Wordsworth: Rossetti; Stories: Playbook: My Dad's Job; Sniff and Wag: The scarecrow's nose; Blue Cow: Blue Cow the fashion model
121	56	"Forgetting"	Stephen Cannon	Penny Lloyd; Karen McCallum; Denise McNee	30 August 2002
Shelley seems to have a hole in her memory. Wordsworth: Shelley; Stories: Playbook: Where is it?; Rainforest Tales: Forgetful Monkey; Blue Cow: Blue Cow and the magic wand
122	57	"Buildings"	Tony Reed; Stephen Cannon	Penny Lloyd; Denise McNee	31 August 2002
Jackson builds a wendy house and Byron becomes a big bad wolf. Wordsworth: Byron; Stories: Playbook: Moving House; Kevin the Spaceman: Paper planet; Blue Cow: Blue Cow and the time machine
123	58	"Treasure Hunt"	Tony Reed; Stephen Cannon; Helen Church	Penny Lloyd; Tracey Hammett; Julia Myles	1 September 2002
Jelly, Rossetti and Jackson go on a treasure hunt. Wordsworth: Rossetti; Stories: Playbook: My new friend Hal; Barnacle Rock: Tambourine moon; Blue Cow: Blue Cow's big cheese
124	59	"Possessions"	Stephen Cannon; Helen Church	Tracey Hammett; Karen McCallum; Julia Myles	2 September 2002
Jackson and Jelly fall out when Jackson refuses to share his teddy cakes. Wordsworth: Shelley; Stories: Playbook: My shop; Rainforest Tales: Sneaky Snake's unfair share; Blue Cow: Blue Cow goes to the football
125	60	"Big and Small"	Tony Reed; Helen Church; Stephen Cannon	Karen McCallum; Caroline Johns; Dyanne White	3 September 2002
There is a giant in the library and Jackson is afraid. Wordsworth: Byron; Stories: Playbook: Today I am a giant; Blue Cow: Blue Cow in the playground; Rainforest Tales: Monkey's dark secret
126	61	"Trees"	Stephen Cannon; Helen Church; Tony Reed	Tracey Hammett; Penny Lloyd	4 September 2002
Webster, Jelly and Jackson make a poem for the poem tree. Wordsworth: Webster; Stories: Playbook: Tree fairies; Blue Cow: Blue Cow in the jungle; Kevin the Spaceman: Planet Splinters

=== Series 3 (2002–03) ===
No. overall	No. in series	Title	Directed by	Written by	Original release date
127	1	"Christmas"	Tony Reed; Sarah Colclough	Tracey Hammett; Denise McNee	25 December 2002
Jelly and Jackson are very excited about Christmas. Wordsworth: Milton; Stories: Playbook: Our Christmas Play; Sniff and Wag: The fir tree; Blue Cow: Blue Cow meets Father Christmas
128	2	"Small Fluffy Things"	Helen Church	Tracey Hammett	5 January 2003
Jelly and Jackson find a very special small and fluffy friend in the library. Wordsworth: Shelley; Stories: Playbook: Tickle my whiskers; Sniff and Wag: Rickety rackety toot toot; Blue Cow: Blue Cow on a cloud
129	3	"Camping"	Brendan McCaul; Tony Reed; Helen Church	Penny Lloyd; Karen McCallum; Tracey Hammett	5 January 2003
With a little magic, Byron helps Jelly and Jackson make a tent in the library. Wordsworth: Byron; Stories: Playbook: Camping; Barnacle Rock: Who's for lunch?; Blue Cow: Blue Cow and the beaver
130	4	"Tools"	Tony Reed; Helen Church	Penny Lloyd; Tracey Hammett; Sasha Hails	5 January 2003
Jelly and Jackson find lots of interesting things in Rossetti's tool box. Wordsworth: Rossetti; Stories: Playbook: Grandad's Yard; The Three Bears: Honey gummy goo; Blue Cow: Blue Cow and the builders
131	5	"Flowers"	Tony Reed; Helen Church	Tracey Hammett; Simon Brown; Carol Donockley	6 January 2003
Milton's magic goes a little wrong when he tries to create some flowers for Jackson. Wordsworth: Milton; Stories: Playbook: Hide and Seek; Kevin the Spaceman: Planet Chill-man; Blue Cow: Blue Cow at the garden centre
132	6	"Fairies"	Tony Reed; Helen Church; Stephen Cannon	Tracey Hammett; Caroline Johns; Sasha Hails	7 January 2003
Jelly and Jackson find some fairy dust in the library. Wordsworth: Shelley; Stories: Playbook: Fairies; Sniff and Wag: Frisky Witch; Blue Cow: Blue Cow and the fairies
133	7	"Trains"	Brendan McCaul; Helen Church	Sasha Hails; Tracey Hammett	8 January 2003
Jackson pretends to be a train, but gets frightened by a spider. Wordsworth: Byron; Stories: Playbook: Henry's train; The Three Bears: The great hairy spider; Blue Cow: Blue Cow and the skunk
134	8	"Light"	Helen Church; Tony Reed	Tracey Hammett; Denise McNee	9 January 2003
Jelly and Jackson find lots of kinds of lights in the library. Wordsworth: Webster; Stories: Playbook: Diwali; Barnacle Rock: Tambourine moon; Blue Cow: Blue Cow and the moonflowers
135	9	"Tall and Short"	Tony Reed; Sarah Colclough	Tracey Hammett; Simon Brown	10 January 2003
Shelley thinks Jelly has grown very tall, but the way Jelly is wobbling gives the game away. Sniff and Wag meet a very tall friend. Wordsworth: Shelley; Stories: Playbook: Too small; Blue Cow: Blue Cow and the ants; Sniff and Wag: Doggy long legs
134	8	"Whales"	Helen Church; Tony Reed	Tracey Hammett; Denise McNee	9 January 2003
Jelly and Jackson find lots of kinds of whales in the library. Wordsworth: Blake; Stories: Blue Cow: Blue Cow and the Blue Whale; Playbook: Whales; Barnacle Rock: Ocean Whales
136	10	"Flags and Signs"	Helen Church; Tony Reed; Stephen Cannon	Karen McCallum; Tracey Hammett; Dyanne White	11 January 2003
Jelly and Jackson dress as pirates and with Byron's help go on a treasure hunt around the library. Sniff and Wag take a trip in the good ship litterbin and Blue Cow helps a princess in a castle. Wordsworth: Byron; Stories: Playbook: Treasure hunt; Sniff and Wag: The good ship Litter Bin; Blue Cow: Blue Cow goes to a castle
137	11	"Busy"	Helen Church	Tracey Hammett; Caroline Johns	12 January 2003
Webster, Jelly and Jackson are having a cleaning and tidying night. Wordsworth: Webster; Stories: Playbook: Hurry up Mum; Blue Cow: Magical Blue Cow; The Three Bears: Wee Willy silly billy
138	12	"Post"	Brendan McCaul; Tony Reed; Sarah Colclough	Penny Lloyd; Karen McCallum; Tracey Hammett	13 January 2003
Rossetti and Jelly visit Jackson's post office to buy stamps for Jelly's letter to Blue Cow. Wordsworth: Rossetti; Stories: Playbook: Posting a letter; Barnacle Rock: A parcel for Gruff; Blue Cow: Blue Cow gets a letter
139	13	"Washing"	Brendan McCaul; Helen Church	Simon Brown	14 January 2003
Byron shows Jelly and Jackson how to wash clothes. Wordsworth: Byron; Stories: Kevin the Spaceman: Planet Pong; Playbook: Doing the washing; Blue Cow: Bubbly Blue Cow
140	14	"Stripes"	Brendan McCaul; Tony Reed; Stephen Cannon	Penny Lloyd; Caroline Johns; Tracey Hammett	15 January 2003
Jackson makes a fuzzy rainbow using paint and water, and Rossetti's magic is upset by a pepper pot. Wordsworth: Rossetti; Stories: Playbook: Hammi and Jocelyn's rainbow day; Sniff and Wag: Madame Tricksy; Blue Cow: Blue Cow and the fortune teller
141	15	"Grown Up"	Tony Reed; Sarah Colclough	Caroline Johns; Tracey Hammett	16 January 2003
Jelly and Jackson play dressing up, and Shelley, who wants to be a pop star when she grows up, shows off her voice. Wordsworth: Shelley; Stories: Playbook: Daisy's daddy comes home; Barnacle Rock: Peepy boo; Blue Cow: Blue Cow the pop star
142	16	"Boxes"	Helen Church	Tracey Hammett; Penny Lloyd; Denise McNee	17 January 2003
Jelly and Jackson have fun playing with boxes. Wordsworth: Webster; Stories: Playbook: The very large box; Barnacle Rock: The Jacketybox; Blue Cow: Blue Cow and the boxes
143	17	"Shops"	Brendan McCaul; Helen Church	Penny Lloyd; Caroline Johns; Tracey Hammett	18 January 2003
Jelly empties her piggy bank and finds out that she is rich. Blue Cow goes to a bed shop and falls asleep in the most comfortable bed in the world. Wordsworth: Shelley; Stories: Playbook: Playing shops; The Three Bears: The missing tarts; Blue Cow: Blue Cow and the comfiest bed in the world
144	18	"Wheezes and Sneezes"	Brendan McCaul; Helen Church	Karen McCallum; Penny Lloyd; Simon Brown	19 January 2003
Jackson comes down with a case of dottyspottyitis, and Byron cannot stop sneezing. Luckily, Nurse Jelly is at hand to look after both of them. Wordsworth: Byron; Stories: Playbook: Spots; Kevin the Spaceman: Planet Chill-man; Blue Cow: Blue Cow and the handkerchief
145	19	"Friends"	Brendan McCaul; Sarah Colclough	Penny Lloyd; Tracey Hammett; Sasha Hails	20 January 2003
Jelly and Jackson each get a present from Rossetti, while Sam has trouble choosing what to buy for his best friend James. Wordsworth: Rossetti; Stories: Blue Cow: Blue Cow makes a friend; Playbook: My friend's present; Sniff and Wag: The petal chase
146	20	"Uniforms"	Tony Reed; Helen Church	Penny Lloyd; Tracey Hammett	21 January 2003
Jelly, Jackson and Shelley are wearing special uniforms for cleaning the library. Shelley doesn't really like her cleaning uniform so she uses it to make a story. Jelly and Shelley enjoy marching when Shelley produces some marching band uniforms. Wordsworth: Shelley; Stories: Playbook: My dad the policeman; The Three Bears: Grand old Mr. Bossy Boots; Blue Cow: Blue Cow to the rescue
147	21	"Make It Go"	Tony Reed; Stephen Cannon; Sarah Colclough	Julia Myles; Tracey Hammett	22 January 2003
Jackson doesn't want to share his toy cars with Jelly, so he gives her a broken one. Luckily Rossetti arrives to lend a hand. Wordsworth: Rossetti; Stories: Playbook: Riding on two wheels; Barnacle Rock: The helmet crab; Blue Cow: Blue Cow and the boat
148	22	"Head and Tails"	Brendan McCaul; Helen Church	Karen McCallum; Simon Brown	23 January 2003
Byron shows Jelly and Jackson how to resolve a quarrel using a coin, while Kevin visits a furry planet. Wordsworth: Byron; Stories: Playbook: I love my wellingtons; Kevin the Spaceman: The furry planet; Blue Cow: Juggling Blue Cow
149	23	"Furniture"	Tony Reed; Stephen Cannon; Sarah Colclough	Sasha Hails; Tracey Hammett; Denise McNee	24 January 2003
Jelly organises a tea party. Wordsworth: Milton; Stories: Playbook: Moving House; Barnacle Rock: The orange thingy bobber; Blue Cow: Blue Cow and the three chairs
150	24	"Space"	Helen Church	Sasha Hails; Michele Durler; Dyanne White	25 January 2003
Byron makes a rocket, and Blue Cow has a planet named after her. Wordsworth: Byron; Stories: Playbook: Mission to the moon; Kevin the Spaceman: Planet Splinters; Blue Cow: Blue Cow in space
151	25	"Pumpkin"	Tony Reed; Stephen Cannon; Sarah Colclough	Tracey Hammett; Denise McNee	27 January 2003
Jackson thinks he has found a big orange football in the library. Wordsworth: Rossetti; Stories: Playbook: Little Boy Green; Sniff and Wag: The Frog Princess; Blue Cow: Blue Cow meets Superchicken
152	26	"Rainy"	Helen Church	Tracey Hammett; Penny Lloyd	28 January 2003
There is a leak in the library roof, so Jelly and Jackson get kitted out for a rainy day. Wordsworth: Webster; Stories: Playbook: Rainy day; The Three Bears: Fishing for a hat; Blue Cow: Blue Cow and the umbrella
153	27	"Aunties and Uncles"	Tony Reed; Sarah Colclough	Penny Lloyd; Tracey Hammett	29 January 2003
Jelly and Jackson find out about aunties and uncles and Blue Cow visits her Aunt Hilda. Wordsworth: Rossetti; Stories: Playbook: My Uncle's dog; Sniff and Wag: Auntie Nan's ice cream van; Blue Cow: Blue Cow visits her Auntie
154	28	"Kings and Queens"	Helen Church; Tony Reed; Sarah Colclough	Sasha Hails; Effua Daniels; Tracey Hammett; Simon Brown	30 January 2003
There is a secret bubble blower in the library tonight. Wordsworth: Byron; Stories: Playbook: Living in a tower; Barnacle Rock: The pink tinkle fish; Blue Cow: Blue Cow and the magic key
155	29	"Wheels"	Brendan McCaul; Tony Reed; Helen Church	Effua Daniels; Simon Brown	31 January 2003
Shelley has some brilliant rollerskates, but she keeps falling over. Isabel takes her friends on her mum's bus in today's playbook. Wordsworth: Shelley; Stories: Playbook: My Mum the bus driver; Kevin the Spaceman: Planet Shape Sorter; Blue Cow: Blue Cow and the caveman
168	42	"Painting"	Brendan McCaul; Helen Church	Karen McCallum; Tracey Hammett	13 February 2003
Webster uses his feet to make a picture, and Jackson makes painting. Wordsworth: Webster; Stories: The Three Bears: Honey Gummy Goo; Kevin The Spaceman: Aliens; Barnacle Rock: Tangle weed
156	30	"See"	Helen Church	Penny Lloyd; Tracey Hammett; Simon Brown	1 February 2003
It is Senses Week in the library, and today's sense is sight. Wordsworth: Rossetti; Stories: Playbook: Exploring; The Three Bears: Hide and sheep; Blue Cow: Film star Blue Cow
157	31	"Hear"	Tony Reed; Helen Church	Tracey Hammett; Simon Brown	2 February 2003
It is Senses Week in the library, and the sense is hearing. Wordsworth: Webster; Stories: Playbook: Holly the Hearing Dog; Kevin the Spaceman: Planet Quaver; Blue Cow: Blue Cow's moosical day
158	32	"Smell"	Tony Reed; Stephen Cannon	Penny Lloyd; Effua Daniels; Tracey Hammett; Denise McNee	3 February 2003
It is Senses Week in the library, and today's sense is smell. Wordsworth: Milton; Stories: Playbook: Supermarket smells; Sniff and Wag: The scarecrow's nose; Blue Cow: Sticky Blue Cow
159	33	"Touch"	Helen Church	Sasha Hails; Penny Lloyd; Simon Brown	4 February 2003
It is Senses Week in the library, and today's sense is touch. Wordsworth: Byron; Stories: Playbook: Pottery; Kevin the Spaceman: Spiky planet; Blue Cow: Blue Cow makes a pot
160	34	"Taste"	Helen Church; Tony Reed	Tracey Hammett; Simon Brown	5 February 2003
It is Senses Week in the library, and the sense is taste. Wordsworth: Shelley; Stories: Playbook: My Mum the chocolate maker; Barnacle Rock: Honey I'm stuck; Blue Cow: Blue Cow at the amusement park
161	35	"Hats"	Brendan McCaul; Stephen Cannon; Helen Church	Penny Lloyd; Tracey Hammett; Simon Brown	6 February 2003
Rossetti puts on a disguise to fool Jelly and Jackson. Wordsworth: Rossetti; Stories: Playbook: My dad the hairdresser; The Three Bears: A bit of a fiddle; Blue Cow: Blue Cow and the cowboy
162	36	"Cooking"	Brendan McCaul; Sarah Colclough	Penny Lloyd; Tracey Hammett; Sasha Hails	7 February 2003
Jelly and Jackson make a mess in the library when they try to make chapattis. Wordsworth: Byron; Stories: Barnacle Rock: Wheeee!; Playbook: A temple visit; Blue Cow: Blue Cow bakes a cake
163	37	"Castles"	Tony Reed; Helen Church	Karen McCallum; Tracey Hammett; Simon Brown	8 February 2003
Milton helps Jelly and Jackson to build a sand castle in the library. Wordsworth: Milton; Stories: Kevin the Spaceman: Sandy Planet; Playbook: Sarah and Kate's castle adventure; Blue Cow: Blue Cow and the tower
164	38	"High and Low"	Brendan McCaul; Tony Reed; Sarah Colclough	Tracey Hammett; Diana Hinshelwood; Simon Brown	9 February 2003
Jelly and Jackson perform a show in the library, and Shelley makes a racket with a microphone they find. Sniff and Wag find a ladder that goes right up to the moon. Wordsworth: Shelley; Stories: Playbook: Climbing mountains; Sniff and Wag: Ladder to the Moon; Blue Cow: Sky-diving Blue Cow
165	39	"Everyone's Different"	Helen Church	Tracey Hammett; Simon Brown	10 February 2003
Byron, Jelly and Jackson make up stories to show that everyone is different. Wordsworth: Byron; Stories: Playbook: Living on a canal boat; The Three Bears: Honey gummy goo; Blue Cow: Blue Cow and Titchy Tim
166	40	"Rubbish"	Brendan McCaul; Helen Church	Karen McCallum; Simon Brown; Penny Lloyd	11 February 2003
Rossetti shows Jelly and Jackson some unusual ways of recycling, while Blue Cow nearly gets dumped in the bin. Wordsworth: Rossetti; Stories: Playbook: Recycling; Kevin the Spaceman: The very messy planet; Blue Cow: Blue Cow and the rubbish
167	41	"Three Wishes"	Helen Church; Tony Reed; Sarah Colclough	Tracey Hammett	12 February 2003
Webster gives Jelly and Jackson a wish. Wordsworth: Webster; Stories: Playbook: Digging for treasure; Sniff and Wag: The little yellow pixie; Blue Cow: Blue Cow and the magic lamp
168	42	"Prints"	Brendan McCaul; Helen Church	Karen McCallum; Tracey Hammett	13 February 2003
Shelley uses her feet to make a picture and Jackson makes potato prints. Wordsworth: Shelley; Stories: Playbook: Happy hippos; Blue Cow: Blue Cow goes to nursery; Barnacle Rock: Tangle weed
169	43	"Feathers"	Tony Reed; Helen Church	Caroline Johns; Tracey Hammett; Simon Brown; Denise McNee	14 February 2003
Jelly, Jackson and Rossetti find a wigwam and a totem pole in the library. Blue Cow wonders what it is like to live in a nest, while Kevin and Spanner find a very tickly planet. Wordsworth: Rossetti; Stories: Playbook: The dream catcher; Kevin the Spaceman: Planet Tickle; Blue Cow: Blue Cow and the nest
170	44	"Shells"	Brendan McCaul; Tony Reed; Helen Church	Karen McCallum; Tracey Hammett; Sasha Hails	15 February 2003
Jackson makes a mermaid out of things from the beach. Wordsworth: Shelley; Stories: Playbook: Rock pools; The Three Bears: Slugs and snails and silver trails; Blue Cow: Blue Cow on a desert island
171	45	"Puzzles"	Brendan McCaul; Tony Reed; Helen Church	Tracey Hammett	16 February 2003
At night in the children's library, the Story Makers conjure up new stories for the young. Wordsworth: Milton; Stories: Kevin the Spaceman: The woolly planet; Barnacle Rock: The swingy upsy downy story; The Three Bears: Black sheep puzzle
172	46	"Yellow"	Helen Church; Simon Brown	Tracey Hammett; Effua Daniels; Penny Lloyd	17 February 2003
Everything is yellow in the library tonight. Wordsworth: Webster; Stories: Playbook: Yellow breakfast; Kevin the Spaceman: Planet Custard; Blue Cow: Blue Cow and the sun
176	50	"Wood"	Tony Reed; Sarah Colclough	Penny Lloyd; Tracey Hammett	21 February 2003
Milton has been on a Wood hunting expedition and drops Wood all over the library floor. Jelly and Jackson make some Wood stories and Blue Cow makes a prickly friend. Wordsworth: Milton; Stories: Playbook: The best band in the land; Blue Cow: Blue Cow and the Badger; The Three Bears: Grand Old Mr Bossy Boots
173	47	"Red"	Brendan McCaul; Stephen Cannon; Helen Church	Penny Lloyd; Tracey Hammett; Simon Brown	18 February 2003
It is party time in the library, and Jelly and Jackson have fun with balloons. Wordsworth: Shelley; Stories: Playbook: Tea for Lady Two Spot; Barnacle Rock: The beautiful ball fish; Blue Cow: Blue Cow and the valentine
174	48	"Blue"	Brendan McCaul; Helen Church	Beverley Hills; Simon Brown	19 February 2003
Jelly makes a collage for Jackson, and two brothers paint their room as a surprise for their father. Wordsworth: Byron; Stories: Playbook: Changing our room; Kevin the Spaceman: The watery planet; Blue Cow: Blue Cow meets Blue Sheep
175	49	"Someone Special"	Brendan McCaul; Helen Church; Clare Farlow	Penny Lloyd; Michele Durler; Tracey Hammett	20 February 2003
Jelly has lost Eddy, her special teddy bear. Wordsworth: Rossetti; Stories: Playbook: Where's bear?; The Three Bears: Where's the kipper?; Blue Cow: Blue Cow becomes a mummy
176	50	"Leaves"	Tony Reed; Sarah Colclough	Penny Lloyd; Tracey Hammett	21 February 2003
Milton has been on a leaf hunting expedition and drops leaves all over the library floor. Jelly and Jackson make some leafy stories and Blue Cow makes a prickly friend. Wordsworth: Milton; Stories: Playbook: Autumn leaves; Sniff and Wag: The leaf heap; Blue Cow: Blue Cow and the hedgehog
179	53	"Superheroes"	Helen Church; Stephen Cannon	Tracey Hammett; Penny Lloyd; Dyanne White	24 February 2003
Blake wants to travel light on his superheroes, but Jelly and Jackson make sure he doesn't. Wordsworth: Blake; Stories: Playbook: Bottles of colour; Blue Cow: Blue Cow gets chicken pox; The Three Bears: The flying pies
177	51	"Babies"	Helen Church; Stephen Cannon; Sarah Colclough	Tracey Hammett	22 February 2003
Jelly and Jackson play at being babies. Wordsworth: Rossetti; Stories: Playbook: My new friend Hal; Barnacle Rock: The grizzly growler; Blue Cow: Blue Cow and the hatchling
178	52	"Spring"	Helen Church	Tracey Hammett; Denise McNee	23 February 2003
Shelley is full of the joys of spring. Wordsworth: Shelley; Stories: Playbook: The joys of Spring; The Three Bears: Bubble baaath!; Blue Cow: Blue Cow in the springtime
179	53	"Summer"	Helen Church; Stephen Cannon	Tracey Hammett; Penny Lloyd; Dyanne White	24 February 2003
Byron wants to travel light on his summer holidays, but Jelly and Jackson make sure he doesn't. Wordsworth: Byron; Stories: Playbook: Together; Kevin the Spaceman: The very green planet; Blue Cow: Blue Cow goes on holiday
180	54	"Autumn"	Helen Church; Tony Reed; Stephen Cannon	Penny Lloyd; Tracey Hammett; Sasha Hails	25 February 2003
The episode shows if there is a muddy-footed leaf monster in the library. Wordsworth: Rossetti; Stories: Playbook: Tree fairies; Sniff and Wag: Bonkers conkers; Blue Cow: Blue Cow and the squirrels
181	55	"Winter"	Helen Church	Tracey Hammett; Denise McNee	26 February 2003
Jelly is a snow queen and Jackson tries his hand at skiing. Wordsworth: Webster; Stories: Playbook: Winter; Blue Cow: Blue Cow goes to a pantomime; The Three Bears: Shivers and twitters
182	56	"Bounce"	Tony Reed; Sarah Colclough	Sasha Hails; Tracey Hammett	27 February 2003
Jelly and Jackson feel bouncy after finding some bouncy balls in the library. Milton teaches them how to bounce inwardly, and Blue Cow has a go on a trampoline. Wordsworth: Milton; Stories: Playbook: The bouncy castle; Barnacle Rock: The blurp blurp monster; Blue Cow: Blue Cow and the trampoline
183	57	"Balancing"	Brendan McCaul; Stephen Cannon	Penny Lloyd; Tracey Hammett; Dyanne White	28 February 2003
Jelly, Jackson and Shelley have fun balancing things in the library. Blue Cow wows her audience with tight-rope walking. Wordsworth: Shelley; Stories: Playbook: Ice skating; Sniff and Wag: The egg and spoon race; Blue Cow: Blue Cow on the high-wire
184	58	"Brothers and Sisters"	Brendan McCaul; Helen Church	Tracey Hammett; Dyanne White	1 March 2003
Byron, Jelly and Jackson are surprised when Shelley appears in the library. Wordsworths: Byron & Shelley; Stories: Playbook: Chapatti making; The Three Bears: The flying pies; Blue Cow: Blue Cow in the hat shop

=== Series 4 (2004) ===
No. overall	No. in series	Title	Directed by	Written by	Original release date
185	1	"Oranges and Lemons"	Justine Hallside	Penny Lloyd; Tracey Hammett; Effua Daniels	25 January 2004
Jelly and Jackson are making pizzas. Byron arrives and helps them make pancakes. Wordsworth: Byron; Stories: Playbook: Pancakes; Blue Cow: Blue Cow and the fruit farm; Super Baby: The bell that went 'squawk'
186	2	"Jealousy"	Brendan McCaul	Clare Bradley; Tracey Hammett; Sasha Hails	26 January 2004
Jackson makes a magic mixture while Rossetti and Jelly plant a magic seed and water it to make it grow. Wordsworth: Rossetti; Stories: Playbook: Making mud pies; Sniff and Wag: The fairy fete; Blue Cow: Blue Cow and the fancy dress parade
187	3	"Rainbows"	Ros Attille	Clare Bradley; Lee Brooks; Simon Brown	27 January 2004
Jelly and Jackson find a rainbow. They pretend to be rainbow fish and sing the fish disco song. Wordsworth: Shelley; Stories: Playbook: Christine's rainbow day; Blue Cow: Blue Cow meets a leprechaun; Kevin the Spaceman: Party Planet
188	4	"Chicken, Chips and Peas"	Justine Hallside	Penny Lloyd; Tracey Hammett; Effua Daniels	25 January 2004
Jelly and Jackson are making Chicken Nuggets. Blake arrives and helps them make Chicken Kevs. Wordsworth: Blake; Stories: Playbook: Chicken Nuggets; Blue Cow: Blue Cow and the Artist; The Three Bears: Lay A Little Chicken Nugget
189	5	"Happy and Sad"	Ros Attille	Tracey Hammett; Denise McNee	28 January 2004
Jelly and Jackson have the giggles and are making each other laugh. Wordsworth: Webster; Stories: Playbook: What makes me happy; The Three Bears: A bit of a fiddle; Blue Cow: Blue Cow meets a clown
196	12	"Going on Waterpark"	Brendan McCaul	Simon Davies; Tracey Hammett; Sasha Hails	31 January 2004
Jelly and Jackson send Milton on a 'library Waterpark'. Wordsworth: Milton; Stories: Playbook: Going on Waterpark; Blue Cow: Blue Cow on a waterslide; Kevin The Spaceman: The Watery Planet
190	6	"Underground"	Justine Hallside	Simon Davies; Lubna Malik; Tracey Hammett; Simon Brown	29 January 2004
Blake is a magician who magically prepares some very strange presents for Jelly and Jackson. Wordsworth: Blake; Stories: Playbook: My cave; Sniff and Wag: The furry turnip; Blue Cow: Blue Cow and the underground train
191	7	"Honesty"	Brendan McCaul	Tracey Hammett; Effua Daniels	30 January 2004
Jackson has a stomach ache so Shelley tries to make it better with some magic food. Wordsworth: Shelley; Stories: Playbook: Honest me; The Three Bears: The missing tarts; Blue Cow: Blue Cow and the fancy pie
192	8	"Camels"	Brendan McCaul	Clare Bradley; Tracey Hammett; Denise McNee	2 February 2004
Jackson is looking for camels so Shelley tries to look for some camels. Wordsworth: Shelley; Stories: Blue Cow: Blue Cow and the Camel; Super Baby: The Desert Sand; Playbook: My Mum the Egyptian
193	9	"Rice"	Brendan McCaul	Clare Bradley; Tracey Hammett; Denise McNee	2 February 2004
Jackson is hungry so Byron tries to cook him some rice. Wordsworth: Byron; Stories: Blue Cow: Blue Cow and the rice; Playbook: My Mum the Rice maker; Kevin The Spaceman: Planet Rice
194	10	"Sausages"	Brendan McCaul	Clare Bradley; Tracey Hammett; Denise McNee	2 February 2004
Jackson is hungry so Blake tries to cook him some sausages. Wordsworth: Blake; Stories: Blue Cow: Blue Cow and the Sausages; Playbook: My Mum the Sausage maker; Kevin The Spaceman: Planet Sausages
195	11	"Pasta"	Brendan McCaul	Clare Bradley; Tracey Hammett; Denise McNee	2 February 2004
Jackson is hungry so Shelley tries to cook him some pasta. Wordsworth: Shelley; Stories: Blue Cow: Blue Cow and the spaghetti; The Three Bears: The Rice Frying; Playbook: My Mum the pasta maker
196	12	"Going on Holiday"	Brendan McCaul	Simon Davies; Tracey Hammett; Sasha Hails	31 January 2004
Jelly and Jackson send Milton on a 'library holiday'. Wordsworth: Milton; Stories: Playbook: Going on holiday; Super Baby: Goodbye Sun; Blue Cow: Blue Cow on a desert island
197	13	"Pink"	Justine Hallside	Tracey Hammett; Simon Brown; Dyanne White	1 February 2004
Tonight in the library everyone is dressed in pink, and Jackson is King Pink. Wordsworth: Byron; Stories: Playbook: My favourite pink animal; Kevin the Spaceman: The furry planet; Blue Cow: Blue Cow and the rainbow
198	14	"Helping"	Brendan McCaul	Clare Bradley; Tracey Hammett; Denise McNee	2 February 2004
Jackson is hungry so Rossetti tries to cook him some pasta. Wordsworth: Rossetti; Stories: Blue Cow: Blue Cow and the spaghetti; Playbook: My Mum the chocolate maker; The Three Bears: The kettle fight
199	15	"Surprise"	Brendan McCaul	Tracey Hammett; Sasha Hails	3 February 2004
Shelley, Jelly and Jackson find a box of surprises left for them by Byron. Wordsworth: Shelley; Stories: Playbook: Party day; Sniff and Wag: The Frog Princess; Blue Cow: Blue Cow and the surprising fish
200	16	"Sticks and Stones"	Ros Attille	Tracey Hammett; Johnny Myers	4 February 2004
Jelly and Jackson decide to go on an outing so Webster magics a beach up for them. Wordsworth: Webster; Stories: Playbook: Callum's day out; The Three Bears: Nick nack paddy whack; Blue Cow: Blue Cow and the cow bell
201	17	"Topsy Turvy"	Brendan McCaul	Tracey Hammett; Penny Lloyd; Denise McNee	5 February 2004
The library seems to be upside down and Rossetti appears to have her clothes on back to front. Wordsworth: Rossetti; Stories: Playbook: My rumble tumble day; Kevin the Spaceman: Planet Opposite; Blue Cow: Blue Cow goes topsy turvy
202	18	"Worms"	Brendan McCaul	Penny Lloyd; Tracey Hammett; Denise McNee	6 February 2004
Jackson makes a wriggly worm puppet. Wordsworth: Shelley; Stories: Playbook: Making compost; Sniff and Wag: The worm charmer; Blue Cow: Blue Cow learns how to wiggle
203	19	"Ducks"	Brendan McCaul	Tracey Hammett; Simon Brown	11 February 2004
Jelly and Jackson are in The Duck Pond. Wordsworth: Rossetti; Stories: Playbook: Duck Pond; Blue Cow: Blue Cow and the Ducks; Super Baby: Ducks At Pond
204	20	"Taking Turns"	Brendan McCaul	Penny Lloyd; Tracey Hammett; Simon Brown	7 February 2004
Jelly and Jackson are doing some box printing in the library. Wordsworth: Byron; Stories: Blue Cow: Blue Cow and the troublesome twins; Playbook: Look what I can see; The Three Bears: Wee Willy silly billy
205	21	"Cats and Dogs"	Justine Hallside	Niraj Kapur; Tracey Hammett; Kathleen Palmer	8 February 2004
Jelly and Jackson pretend to be cats and dogs. Wordsworth: Blake; Stories: Playbook: Holly the Hearing Dog; Super Baby: Furballs and squeaks; Blue Cow: Hey Diddle Diddle
206	22	"Skunk"	Justine Hallside	Simon Davies; Simon Brown; Clare Bradley	10 February 2004
Jelly and Jackson find three skunks for the forest. Wordsworth: Byron; Stories: Playbook: Looking At Skunks; Blue Cow: Blue Cow and the skunk; Kevin the Spaceman: Planet Skunk
187	3	"Funfair"	Ros Attille	Clare Bradley; Lee Brooks; Simon Brown	27 January 2004
Jelly and Jackson find a funfair. They pretend to be carousel and sing the Funfair song. Wordsworth: Blake; Stories: The Three Bears: The kettle fight; Kevin the Spaceman: Planet Puff; Super Baby: King Of The Castle
207	23	"Dancing"	Brendan McCaul	Clare Bradley; Tracey Hammett	9 February 2004
Byron makes a dancing puppet for Jelly and Jackson, then they have a go at line dancing. Wordsworth: Byron; Stories: Sniff and Wag: The little yellow pixie; Playbook: Line dancing; Blue Cow: Blue Cow at the village fete
208	24	"Pong"	Justine Hallside	Simon Davies; Simon Brown; Clare Bradley	10 February 2004
Jelly and Jackson find three boxes for the charity shop full of interesting items. Wordsworth: Blake; Stories: Playbook: Making gloop; Kevin the Spaceman: Planet Pong; Blue Cow: Blue Cow and the skunk
209	25	"Faces"	Brendan McCaul	Tracey Hammett; Simon Brown	11 February 2004
Jelly and Jackson are in disguise. Wordsworth: Rossetti; Stories: Playbook: Open wide; The Three Bears: Grand old Mr. Bossy Boots; Blue Cow: Blue Cow and the artist
210	26	"Sea Snakes"	Brendan McCaul	Tracey Hammett; Simon Brown	18 February 2004
Shelley shows Jelly and Jackson how to find a snake. Wordsworth: Shelley; Stories: Blue Cow: Blue Cow Makes A Pot; Playbook: Book Got To Go Back; Kevin The Spaceman: Planet Loch Ness Monster
211	27	"Pizzas"	Justine Hallside	Simon Davies; Tracey Hammett	16 March 2004
Jelly, Jackson and Blake make pizzas. Wordsworth: Blake; Stories: Playbook: Making Pizza; Blue Cow: Blue Cow and the Pizzas; Super Baby: Policeman on the city
212	28	"Moon"	Ros Attille	Clare Bradley; Tracey Hammett; Dyanne White	17 February 2004
The episode shows a trip adventure to the Moon. Wordsworth: Milton; Stories: Playbook: My African drum; Blue Cow: Blue Cow And The Marbles; The Three Bears: My Friend Fred
207	23	"Golf"	Brendan McCaul	Clare Bradley; Tracey Hammett	9 February 2004
Byron makes a golf game for Jelly and Jackson, then they have a go at playing golf. Wordsworth: Byron; Stories: Playbook: Time For a Strike; Blue Cow: Blue Cow Learns To Play Golf; Sniff and Wag: The dog show
213	29	"Pipes"	Justine Hallside	Penny Lloyd; Tracey Hammett; Simon Brown	19 February 2004
Jelly, Jackson and Blake have pipes to look for. Wordsworth: Blake; Stories: Playbook: Look what I can see; Blue Cow: Blue Cow and the Frogs; Sniff and Wag: Madame Tricksy
214	30	"Dragons"	Ros Attille	Tracey Hammett; Simon Brown	12 February 2004
Jelly and Jackson dress up as a dragon. Wordsworth: Webster; Stories: Blue Cow: Blue Cow and the dragon; Super Baby: What's in the egg?; Playbook: Dancing dragons
217	33	"Monkeys"	Brendan McCaul	Clare Bradley; Penny Lloyd; Simon Brown	14 February 2004
It is Nonsense Week in the library and Blake gets a headache when Jelly and Jackson go bananas after finding a toy monkey in the library. Wordsworth: Blake; Stories: Blue Cow: Blue Cow And The Cheeky Monkey; Playbook: Monkeys At The Zoo; The Three Bears: Monkeys Jumping On A Table
218	34	"Tree Bark"	Justine Hallside	Simon Davies; Simon Brown	15 February 2004
It is Nonsense Week in the library, and shelley makes a tree bark for Jackson and a nest for Jelly. Wordsworth: Shelley; Stories: Blue Cow: Blue Cow And The Nest; Playbook: The Budgie Show; Super Baby: Robin's Nest
219	35	"Magpies"	Justine Hallside	Karen McCallum; Tracey Hammett; Dyanne White	16 February 2004
It is Nonsense Week in the library. Jelly and Jackson learn the difference between a nest and a magpie. Wordsworth: Byron; Stories: Playbook: Tree Nest; Blue Cow: Blue Cow and the crows; Kevin The Spaceman: Planet Magpies
220	36	"Crocodiles"	Ros Attille	Clare Bradley; Tracey Hammett; Dyanne White	17 February 2004
It is Nonsense Week in the library. Jelly and Jackson follow the crocodile in the jungle. Wordsworth: Webster; Stories: Blue Cow: Blue Cow and the crocodile; Playbook: Happy hippos; Sniff and Wag: The Crocodile's Swamp
221	37	"Ice Creams"	Brendan McCaul	Tracey Hammett; Simon Brown	18 February 2004
It is Nonsense Week in the library and Rossetti shows Jelly and Jackson how to make ice creams from the ice cream van. Wordsworth: Rossetti; Stories: Blue Cow: Blue Cow And The Ice Cream; Playbook: My Dad The Ice cream Van; The Three Bears- The Ice Cream Fight
215	31	"Lost"	Ros Attille	Tracey Hammett	13 February 2004
Jelly, Jackson and Shelley are playing hide and seek. Wordsworth: Shelley; Stories: Sniff and Wag: Hide and squeak; Blue Cow: Cuddly Blue Cow; Playbook: Where's my teddy?
216	32	"Ladybirds"	Ros Attille	Clare Bradley; Lee Brooks; Simon Brown	27 January 2004
Jelly and Jackson find a garden. They pretend to be Ladybirds and sing the ladybird song. Wordsworth: Shelley; Stories: Playbook: Dancing; Blue Cow: Blue Cow and the tower; Sniff And Wag: The fairy fate
223	39	"City"	Justine Hallside	Penny Lloyd; Tracey Hammett; Simon Brown	19 February 2004
Jelly, Jackson and Byron have city. Wordsworth: Byron; Stories: Playbook: City To Explore; Blue Cow: Blue Cow and the City; Super Baby: Policeman on the city
204	20	"Cafe"	Brendan McCaul	Penny Lloyd; Tracey Hammett; Simon Brown	7 February 2004
Jelly and Jackson are doing some savoury food in the library. Wordsworth: Byron; Stories: Playbook: Sausages; Blue Cow: Blue Cow and the smelly shoes; The Three Bears: My Friend Fred
217	33	"Circles"	Brendan McCaul	Clare Bradley; Penny Lloyd; Simon Brown	14 February 2004
It is Shapes Week in the Library and Jelly and Jackson are curious to know why wheels are circular. Jelly thinks a triangular wheel would look nice. Wordsworth: Rossetti; Stories: Playbook: Circles on my mind; Blue Cow: Blue Cow and the caveman; Kevin the Spaceman: Spotty Planet
218	34	"Squares"	Justine Hallside	Simon Davies; Simon Brown	15 February 2004
It is Shapes Week in the Library, and Blake makes a spaceman's helmet for Jackson and a Jelly-vision for Jelly. Wordsworth: Blake; Stories: Playbook: Pottery; Kevin the Spaceman: Planet Building Blocks; Blue Cow: Blue Cow and the board game
219	35	"Rectangles"	Justine Hallside	Karen McCallum; Tracey Hammett; Dyanne White	16 February 2004
It is Shapes Week in the Library. Jelly and Jackson learn the difference between a square and a rectangle. Wordsworth: Byron; Stories: Playbook: My new toy box; Super Baby: The rainbow reindeer; Blue Cow: Blue Cow goes to a concert
220	36	"Triangles"	Ros Attille	Clare Bradley; Tracey Hammett; Dyanne White	17 February 2004
It is Shapes Week in the Library. Jelly and Jackson follow the golden triangle treasure trail. Wordsworth: Webster; Stories: Playbook: Green Triangle Sails; Blue Cow: Blue Cow Learns To Play Golf; The Three Bears: Fishing for a hat
221	37	"Stars"	Brendan McCaul	Tracey Hammett; Simon Brown	18 February 2004
It is Shapes Week in the Library and Shelley shows Jelly and Jackson how to make stars out of two triangles. Wordsworth: Shelley; Stories: Sniff and Wag: Ladder to the Moon; Blue Cow: Blue Cow flies to Mars; Playbook: Starfish
222	38	"Baby Birds"	Ros Attille	Tracey Hammett; Johnny Myers	4 February 2004
Jelly and Jackson decide to go on an outing so Webster magics a baby bird up for them. Wordsworth: Webster; Stories: Playbook: Callum's baby ducklings; Blue Cow: Blue Cow and the little Baby Chicks; Sniff and Wag: The good ship Litter Bin
225	41	"Penguins"	Justine Hallside	Niraj Kapur; Tracey Hammett; Simon Brown	21 February 2004
Jelly and Jackson learn all about penguins and have a pretend penguins. Wordsworth: Blake; Stories: Playbook: The Penguin Show; Blue Cow: Blue Cow and the Penguins; Super Baby: The Penguins' Snow
223	39	"Inside Out"	Justine Hallside	Penny Lloyd; Tracey Hammett; Simon Brown	19 February 2004
Jelly, Jackson and Byron have a dressing up race. Wordsworth: Byron; Stories: Playbook: Look what I can do; The Three Bears: My friend Fred; Blue Cow: Blue Cow and the mannequin
224	40	"Wriggles and Giggles"	Ros Attille	Kathleen Palmer; Simon Brown; Caroline Johns	20 February 2004
Jackson tickles Jelly and Shelley gets stuck in a play tunnel. Wordsworth: Shelley; Stories: Kevin the Spaceman: Planet Tickle; Blue Cow: Blue Cow and the exercise class; Playbook: The tickle monster
225	41	"Frosty Day"	Justine Hallside	Niraj Kapur; Tracey Hammett; Simon Brown	21 February 2004
Jelly and Jackson learn all about the South Pole and have a pretend snowball fight. Wordsworth: Blake; Stories: Playbook: The Penguin Show; Super Baby: Night night; Blue Cow: Blue Cow and the snowman
238	54	"Tambourine"	Justine Hallside	Tracey Hammett; Simon Brown	2 March 2004
Jelly dresses up as a lion, and Jackson tries to play Milton's mysterious tambourine. Wordsworth: Milton; Stories: Playbook: My Mum The Safari Explorer; Blue Cow: Blue Cow and the decorator; Super Baby: Choo Choo
226	42	"Whizz, Pop, Bang"	Brendan McCaul	Clare Bradley; Tracey Hammett	22 February 2004
Rossetti's bicycle is dressed up as Blue Cow so that they can go to a fancy dress party. Wordsworth: Rossetti; Stories: Sniff and Wag: The fairy dog mother; Playbook: Mum's new car; Blue Cow: Bubbly Blue Cow
227	43	"Floating and Sinking"	Ros Attille	Clare Bradley; Lee Brooks	23 February 2004
Jelly and Jackson perform floating and sinking experiments, accompanied by Webster. Wordsworth: Webster; Stories: Blue Cow: Blue Cow and the boat; Playbook: Living on a canal boat; Kevin the Spaceman: Planet Puff
266	82	"Ghosts"	Brendan McCaul	Beverley Hills; Tracey Hammett; Karen McCallum	27 March 2004
Byron makes a ghost laugh of the library for Jelly and Jackson to make them laugh, which may lead to the ghost. Wordsworth: Byron; Stories: Playbook: Christopher's Ghost; Blue Cow: Blue Cow and the ghost train; Sniff And Wag: Sniff and Wag and the leprechaun
228	44	"Paper"	Brendan McCaul	Tracey Hammett; Simon Brown; Denise McNee	24 February 2004
Rossetti follows a paper trail and Jelly and Jackson make paper flowers, leaves and butterflies. Wordsworth: Rossetti; Stories: Blue Cow: Blue Cow meets a hamster; Playbook: Fly like a butterfly; Kevin the Spaceman: The very messy planet
229	45	"Chickens"	Justine Hallside	Penny Lloyd; Tracey Hammett; Effua Daniels	25 January 2004
A cockerel's crow upsets Byron, while Jackson shows Jelly how a chicken lays an egg. Wordsworth: Byron; Stories: Blue Cow: Blue Cow meets superchicken; Playbook: Chickens laying eggs; Super Baby: Chickens
230	46	"Dens and Tunnels"	Justine Hallside	Tracey Hammett; Karen McCallum; Dystin Johnson	25 February 2004
Jelly and Jackson make a den for Byron. Wordsworth: Byron; Stories: Playbook: Camping; Sniff and Wag: The train ride; Blue Cow: Blue Cow's mysterious adventure
231	47	"Jobs"	Ros Attille	Tracey Hammett; Stephen Cannon	26 February 2004
Jelly and Jackson are trying out different jobs. Wordsworth: Webster; Stories: Playbook: Guess what I'll be; Super Baby: The sticky wig; Blue Cow: Blue Cow and the lollipop lady
232	48	"Hands and Feet"	Ros Attille	Tracey Hammett; Simon Brown	27 February 2004
Jelly and Jackson make some interesting music for Shelley. Wordsworth: Shelley; Stories: Playbook: Exploring; The Three Bears: Little pig band; Blue Cow: Blue Cow and the smelly shoes
233	49	"Dogs"	Brendan McCaul	Tracey Hammett; Simon Brown	18 February 2004
Shelley shows Jelly and Jackson how to give a dog a bone. Wordsworth: Shelley; Stories: Blue Cow: Blue Cow And The dog; Playbook: Feed The Dogs; Super Baby: Dog's Bone
234	50	"Crunch"	Brendan McCaul	Clare Bradley; Lubna Malik; Tracey Hammett; Dystin Johnson	28 February 2004
Jelly and Jackson play a game with Byron, guessing what is crunching under foot. They go on a bear hunt. Wordsworth: Byron; Stories: Playbook: Crunch; Sniff and Wag: The leaf heap; Blue Cow: Blue Cow and the car cruncher
235	51	"Kisses and Hugs"	Brendan McCaul	Clare Bradley; Caroline Johns; Tracey Hammett; Simon Brown	29 February 2004
Jackson learns that the letter X can mean the same as a kiss, but Jelly thinks kisses are silly. Wordsworth: Rossetti; Stories: Super Baby: The silver bridge; Playbook: Daisy's daddy comes home; Blue Cow: Blue Cow and the magic key
236	52	"Sparkles and Glitter"	Justine Hallside	Tracey Hammett; Archana Kalyana; Denise McNee	1 March 2004
Jelly and Jackson take dancing lessons. Wordsworth: Byron; Stories: Playbook: Indian dance class; Kevin the Spaceman: The watery planet; Blue Cow: Blue Cow and the glitter ball disco
246	62	"Wedding"	Brendan McCaul	Simon Davies; Karen McCallum; Tracey Hammett; Johnny Myers	10 March 2004
Jackson and Milton try to cure Jelly's wedding. Wordsworth: Milton; Stories: Playbook: Seeing The Wedding; Blue Cow: Blue Cow At The Wedding; Sniff and Wag: Hide And Squeak
237	53	"Ballerina"	Ros Attille	Tracey Hammett; Simon Brown	12 February 2004
Jelly and Jackson dress up as a ballerina. Wordsworth: Webster; Stories: Blue Cow: Blue Cow learns to dance; Playbook: Ballet Lesson; Super Baby: Dancing Like A Ballerina
238	54	"Guess What?"	Justine Hallside	Tracey Hammett; Simon Brown	2 March 2004
Jelly dresses up as a tiger, and Jackson tries to play Blake's mysterious singing bowl. Wordsworth: Blake; Stories: Playbook: Guess what?; Super Baby: Ah harrrr!; Blue Cow: TV star Blue Cow
239	55	"Making Cakes"	Ros Attille	Clare Bradley; Tracey Hammett; Sasha Hails	3 March 2004
Jelly and Jackson make Jack and Jill cookies. Wordsworth: Webster; Stories: Playbook: Our topsy turvy cake; The Three Bears: The flying pies; Blue Cow: Blue Cow bakes a cake
240	56	"Excited"	Ros Attille	Penny Lloyd; Tracey Hammett; Simon Brown	4 March 2004
Jelly and Jackson throw a surprise party for Shelley. Wordsworth: Shelley; Stories: Playbook: Megan's tea party; Sniff and Wag: The dog show; Blue Cow: Blue Cow and the excited elephants
241	57	"The Number One"	Ros Attille	Beverley Hills; Tracey Hammett; Sasha Hails	5 March 2004
It is Numbers Week in the library and Jelly and Jackson are finding out about the number one. Wordsworth: Webster; Stories: Playbook: One sunny day; The Three Bears: Dickory dockery; Blue Cow: Blue Cow and the race
242	58	"The Number Two"	Ros Attille	Caroline Johns; Penny Lloyd; Johnny Myers	6 March 2004
It is Numbers Week in the library and Jelly and Jackson are finding out about the number two. Wordsworth: Shelley; Stories: Playbook: The two of us; Kevin the Spaceman: The very tiny planet; Blue Cow: Blue Cow and the identical twin
243	59	"The Number Three"	Justine Hallside	Caroline Davies; Tracey Hammett; Sasha Hails	7 March 2004
It is Numbers Week in the library and Jelly and Jackson are finding out all about the number three. Wordsworth: Byron; Stories: Sniff and Wag: The petal chase; Playbook: Us Three; Blue Cow: Blue Cow and the triplets
244	60	"The Number Four"	Justine Hallside	Simon Davies; Tracey Hammett; Lotte Elwell	8 March 2004
It is Numbers Week in the library and Jelly and Jackson are finding out all about the number four. Wordsworth: Blake; Stories: Playbook: Jennifer's counting day; Super Baby: Counting Sheep; Blue Cow: Blue Cow goes to a tennis match
245	61	"The Number Five"	Brendan McCaul	Tracey Hammett; Caroline Johns	9 March 2004
It is Numbers Week in the library and Jelly and Jackson are finding out all about the number five. Wordsworth: Rossetti; Stories: Playbook: Five Currant Buns; The Three Bears: Crabby; Blue Cow: Blue Cow and the hockey team
249	65	"Dandelions"	Brendan McCaul	Sue Dreghorn; Tracey Hammett; Kathleen Palmer	13 March 2004
Jelly and Jackson find Byron's dandelion. Wordsworth: Byron; Stories: Blue Cow: Blue Cow And The Dandelion; Playbook: Sai's Bug Hunt; Kevin The Spaceman: Planet Dandelions
246	62	"Lost Voice"	Brendan McCaul	Simon Davies; Karen McCallum; Tracey Hammett; Johnny Myers	10 March 2004
Jackson and Milton try to cure Jelly's hiccups. Wordsworth: Milton; Stories: Playbook: Posting a letter; Sniff and Wag: The Idontknowhatarus; Blue Cow: Yodelling Blue Cow
247	63	"Hit It"	Ros Attille	Tracey Hammett; Simon Brown; Dyanne White	11 March 2004
Jelly and Jackson have got the rhythm, playing the drums, the biscuit tin and the flower pot. Wordsworth: Webster; Stories: Playbook: My African drum; Blue Cow: Blue Cow and the drum kit; Kevin the Spaceman: Planet Quaver
248	64	"Twirls, Swirls and Curls"	Ros Attille	Tracey Hammett; Johnny Myers	12 March 2004
Jelly and Jackson play with a spinning top while Shelley gets a new hairstyle that is not quite what she imagined. Wordsworth: Shelley; Stories: The Three Bears: Curlylocks; Blue Cow: Dizzy Blue Cow; Playbook: Twirls, swirls and curls
249	65	"Photographs"	Brendan McCaul	Sue Dreghorn; Tracey Hammett; Kathleen Palmer	13 March 2004
Jelly and Jackson find Byron's photograph album. Wordsworth: Byron; Stories: Super Baby: Flash crash boom; Blue Cow: Snap happy Blue Cow; Playbook: Smile
259	75	"Trains And Tunnels"	Justine Hallside	Clare Bradley; Tracey Hammett; Dyanne White	20 March 2004
The Story Makers adopt a train station theme. Byron makes trains and stations to decorate the library, and Jelly pretends to be a train driver. Wordsworth: Byron; Stories: Playbook: My Dad The Train Driver; Blue Cow: Blue Cow and the train; Sniff And Wag: The Train Ride
250	66	"Purple"	Brendan McCaul	Tracey Hammett; Simon Brown	14 March 2004
The children have brought a variety of purple things into the library. Rossetti, Jelly and Jackson decide to make the colour purple by mixing blue and red paint. Wordsworth: Rossetti; Stories: Playbook: Purple peacock; Sniff and Wag: Sniff and Wag and the flower show; Blue Cow: Blue Cow and the angriest man in the world
251	67	"Birds and Flying"	Justine Hallside	Tracey Hammett; Denise McNee	15 March 2004
Jelly and Jackson are trying to learn to fly. Wordsworth: Byron; Stories: Playbook: The quack quack duck song; Blue Cow: Blue Cow in the springtime; The Three Bears: Shivers and twitters
252	68	"Orange"	Justine Hallside	Simon Davies; Tracey Hammett	16 March 2004
Jelly, Jackson and Blake have fun playing lots of games with fruit. Wordsworth: Blake; Stories: Playbook: Our Orange Tea; Super Baby: Somewhere under the rainbow; Blue Cow: Blue Cow takes to the sky
253	69	"Sheep"	Ros Attille	Tracey Hammett; Simon Brown; Dyanne White	11 March 2004
Jelly has lost her sheep so Webster helps her look for them. Wordsworth: Webster; Stories: Playbook: Sheep's Cotton Wool; Blue Cow: Blue Cow and the white sheep; Super Baby: Counting Sheep
254	70	"Black and White"	Brendan McCaul	Tracey Hammett; Simon Brown; Dyanne White	17 March 2004
Jelly and Jackson each choose a black and white pet to look after. Wordsworth: Rossetti; Stories: Playbook: My black and white dogs; Blue Cow: Blue Cow goes to the beauty parlour; Kevin the Spaceman: The stripy planet
255	71	"Decorating"	Brendan McCaul	Simon Davies; Tracey Hammett	18 March 2004
Milton magics some eggs for Jelly and Jackson to decorate. Wordsworth: Milton; Stories: Playbook: Changing our room; Super Baby: The beautiful sari; Blue Cow: Blue Cow and the trifle tower
256	72	"Pigs"	Brendan McCaul	Clare Bradley; Caroline Johns; Tracey Hammett; Simon Brown	29 February 2004
Jackson learns that pigs can mean the same as pink, but Jelly thinks pigs are muddy. Wordsworth: Rossetti; Stories: Playbook: My Favourite Pink Animal; Blue Cow: Blue Cow and the pig; Super Baby: The pink pigs
257	73	"Singing"	Ros Attille	Penny Lloyd; Tracey Hammett	19 March 2004
Jelly and Jackson are trying to sing a song, but are having trouble remembering how it goes. Wordsworth: Shelley; Stories: Playbook: Long, long ago; Sniff and Wag: Cat in a bush; Blue Cow: Blue Cow's moosical day
258	74	"Horses"	Brendan McCaul	Clare Bradley; Tracey Hammett; Sasha Hails	26 January 2004
Rossetti is showing Jelly and Jackson a picture of the young Rossetti on her horse. Jelly has found a toy carousel in the library. Wordsworth: Rossetti; Stories: Sniff and Wag: Horses At The Ready; Playbook: Horses Riding; Blue Cow: Blue Cow and the horse
259	75	"Rockpools"	Justine Hallside	Clare Bradley; Tracey Hammett; Dyanne White	20 March 2004
The Story Makers adopt a seaside theme. Byron makes seaweed and shells to decorate the library, and Jelly pretends to be a crab. Wordsworth: Byron; Stories: Playbook: Rock pools; Super Baby: King of the castle; Blue Cow: Blue Cow goes on holiday
260	76	"Gardens"	Justine Hallside	Simon Davies; Lee Brooks; Carol Donockley	21 March 2004
Jelly and Jackson find some very large snails in the library. Wordsworth: Blake; Stories: Playbook: Sai's bug hunt; Kevin the Spaceman: The amazing planet; Blue Cow: Blue Cow at the garden centre
261	77	"Fruit"	Brendan McCaul	Caroline Davies; Tracey Hammett	22 March 2004
Jackson makes a fruit salad for Jelly, but Jelly only likes to eat apples. Wordsworth: Shelley; Stories: Playbook: Tutti fruity salad; Blue Cow: Blue Cow and the yellow paint; The Three Bears: Treasure Pie
262	78	"Bones"	Ros Attille	Tracey Hammett; Sophie Crichton; Simon Brown	23 March 2004
Jelly and Jackson are playing with bubbles when Jelly slips and hurts herself. Luckily, Jackson comes to her rescue. Wordsworth: Webster; Stories: Kevin the Spaceman: Bubble planet; Blue Cow: Blue Cow goes to hospital; Playbook: Poorly Poppy
263	79	"Scary"	Brendan McCaul	Clare Bradley; Tracey Hammett	24 March 2004
Rossetti takes Jelly and Jackson on a car ride that is a little too exciting for Jelly. Wordsworth: Rossetti; Stories: Blue Cow: Blue Cow and the rally; Playbook: The car wash monster; Sniff and Wag: Doggy long legs
264	80	"Broken"	Justine Hallside	Simon Davies; Tracey Hammett; Sasha Hails	25 March 2004
Blake makes a crocodile for Jelly and Jackson. Wordsworth: Blake; Stories: Playbook: Decorating eggs; The Three Bears: Honey gummy goo; Blue Cow: Blue Cow and the broken things
265	81	"Push Me, Pull Me"	Ros Attille	Clare Bradley; Lee Brooks; Karen McCallum	26 March 2004
Shelley magics a bag of marshmallows for them all to eat, but Jackson hides them. Wordsworth: Shelley; Stories: Playbook: Our family Passover dinner; Kevin the Spaceman: Marshmallow planet; Blue Cow: Blue Cow and the tug of war
266	82	"Hills and Mountains"	Brendan McCaul	Beverley Hills; Tracey Hammett; Karen McCallum	27 March 2004
Byron makes a map of the library for Jelly and Jackson to follow, which may lead to hidden treasure. Wordsworth: Byron; Stories: Super Baby: Making molehills; Playbook: Christopher's Climb; Blue Cow: Blue Cow and the treasure hunt
