= Shameless (British TV series) =

Comedy-drama series (2004–2013)

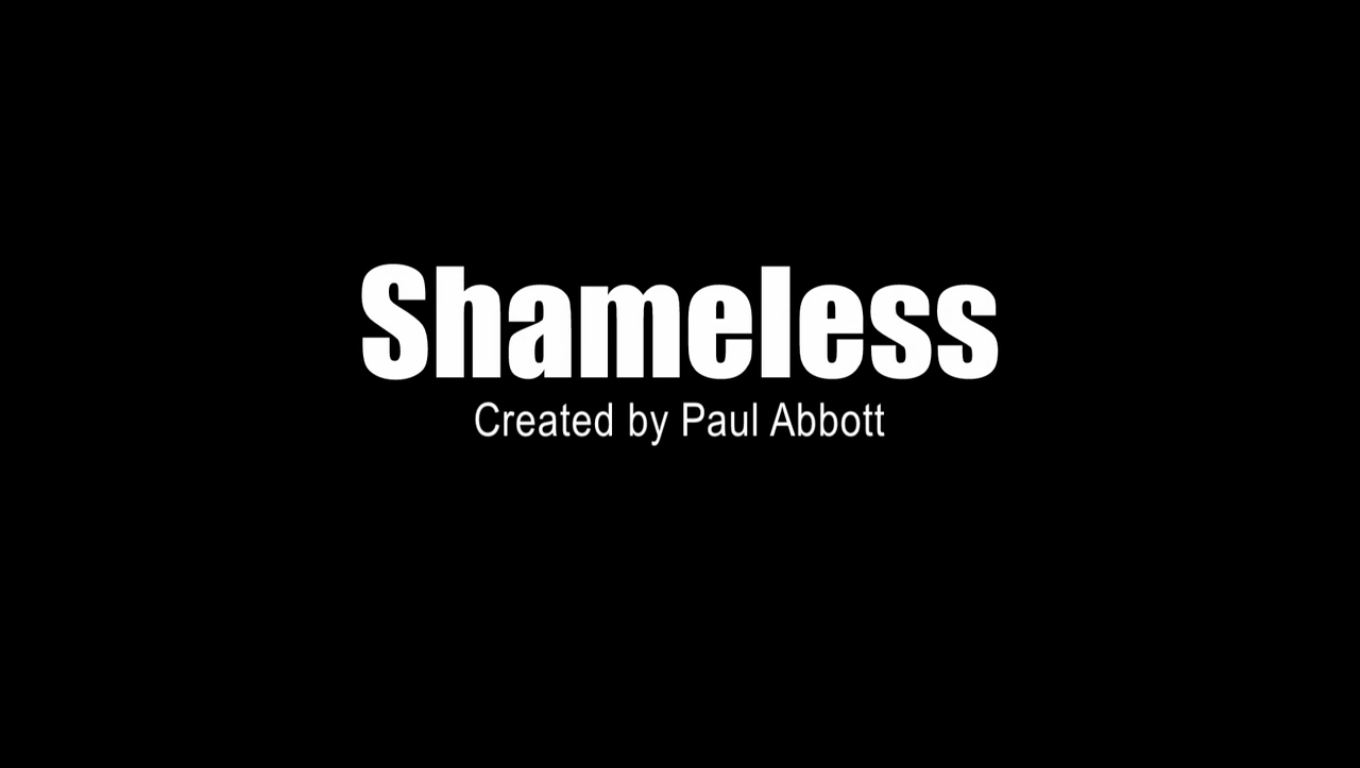
- Genre: Comedy drama; Family drama; Black comedy
- Created by: Paul Abbott
- Starring: David Threlfall; Annabelle Apsion; Maggie O'Neill; Anne-Marie Duff; James McAvoy; Jody Latham; Gerard Kearns; Rebecca Ryan; Elliott Tittensor; Luke Tittensor; Joseph Furnace; Johnny Bennett; Alana & Anabelle Crampton; Nikita Brownlee; John Woodvine; Edna Doré; Sean Gilder; Tina Malone; Aaron McCusker; Nicky Evans; Ciarán Griffiths; Samantha Siddall; Lola & Macy Yoxall; Bethany Thompson; Warren Brown; Steve Bell; Clyve Bonelle; Will Willoughby; Rebecca Atkinson; Sally Carman; Michael Taylor; Kari Corbett; Dean Lennox Kelly; Maxine Peake; Marjorie Yates; Jack Deam; Gillian Kearney; Pauline McLynn; Valerie Lilley; Robbie Conway; Chris Bisson; Kelli Hollis; Qasim Akhtar; Sarah Byrne; Shireen Shah; Shobu Kapoor; Aysha Kala; Emmanuel Ighodaro; Karen Bryson; Kira Martin; Jacqueline Boatswain; Adelle Leonce; Joanna Higson; Philip Hill-Pearson; Joe Duttine; Angeline Ball; Stephen Lord; Jalaal Hartley; Isy Suttie; Rhys Cadman; Jade Kilduff; Lewis Hardaker; Anthony Flanagan; Lindsey Dawson; Warren Donnelly; Dystin Johnson; Alice Barry; Brana Bajic; Chris Coghill; Michael Legge; Amanda Ryan; Ben Batt
- Theme music composer: Murray Gold
- Country of origin: United Kingdom
- Original language: English
- No. of series: 11
- No. of episodes: 139 (list of episodes)

Production
- Executive producers: Paul Abbott; George Faber; Charles Pattinson; Matt Jones; David Threlfall
- Production locations: Wythenshawe, Manchester, England
- Cinematography: Andy McDonnell; Gavin Struthers (series 4–5)
- Running time: 42–76 minutes
- Production companies: Company Pictures; All3Media

Original release
- Network: Channel 4
- Release: 13 January 2004 – 28 May 2013

Related
- Shameless (American adaptation)

Shameless is a British comedy drama television programme created and executive produced by Paul Abbott. Set in Manchester on the fictional Chatsworth council estate, the show stars a large ensemble cast led by David Threlfall as alcoholic father of six, Frank Gallagher. Produced by Company Pictures, the show aired on Channel 4 from 2004 to 2013 for eleven series and 139 episodes.

Shameless was praised by the British media, including the newspaper The Sun and Newsnight Review on BBC Two. In 2005, the show won Best Drama Series at the BAFTA TV Awards and Best TV Comedy Drama at the British Comedy Awards. An American adaptation of Shameless aired on Showtime from 9 January 2011 to 11 April 2021.

== Series overview ==
=== Series 1 (2004) ===
The first series of Shameless ran from 13 January to 24 February 2004, and consisted of seven episodes. It chronicled the life of the Gallagher family and their neighbours. David Threlfall was cast as an alcoholic father, Frank Gallagher, living with his children in their neighborhood. Anne-Marie Duff was cast as his eldest daughter and head of the family, Fiona. Jody Latham and Gerard Kearns played Gallagher brothers Lip Gallagher and Ian Gallagher. Twin brothers Elliott Tittensor and Luke Tittensor both took on the role of youngster Carl Gallagher, whilst Rebecca Ryan was cast as youngest daughter Debbie Gallagher.

The main storyline during the first series was the romance between Fiona and Steve. Many other plots took centre stage throughout the series, in particular, the affair between Frank Gallagher and Karen Jackson, despite Karen dating Lip and Frank being in a relationship with Karen's mother, Sheila. The storyline ended with a violent showdown between Lip and Frank, and Karen absconding from Chatsworth. Other storylines included Ian Gallagher's homosexuality and his affair with shopkeeper Kash, Kev and Veronica's fake wedding, Sheila attempting to overcome her agoraphobia, and Frank's strained relationship with most of his kids. The series concluded with a two-part story, featuring the return of the Gallaghers' absent mother Monica, played by Annabelle Apsion, and Frank's growing debts. The series concludes with Frank faking his own death to evade bailiffs and his growing debts and the announcement that Sheila, who had overcome her agoraphobia, was pregnant by Frank.

=== Series 2 (2005) ===
The second series ran from 4 January to 8 March 2005. It consisted of ten regular episodes and a Christmas Special (which aired on 23 December 2004).

=== Series 3 (2006) ===
The third series began on 10 January and ended on 21 February 2006. The series was reduced to eight episodes.

The third series did not feature Fiona or Steve, who were both heavily featured in the previous series. This series saw Carl's character, who had a minor role in the first series, and a slightly larger role in the second, expanded. This series also saw the introduction of Nicky Evans as Shane Maguire, who only appeared in one episode, but would become main character in later series.

The series begins with a New Year's Day special where Debbie convinces everyone Liam has cancer to stop him getting expelled from school but things slowly get out of hand. Monica and her lover Norma Starkey, played by Dystin Johnson, return for one episode this series. Kev and Veronica unsuccessfully trying for a baby through IVF, Mandy giving birth to Lip's baby, and Frank and Sheila getting married are all storylines covered in the third series.

=== Series 4 (2007) ===
The fourth series, again consisting of eight episodes, ran between 9 January until 27 February 2007. It featured the biggest cast change in the show's nine-year run, with many characters from the first three series departing and many new characters introduced to replace them. Most notably, the series saw the introduction of the Maguire family as main characters, rather than the antagonists that they were in the early series. From Series 4, the Maguires would gradually become the focus of the show during its final years. Alongside Tina Malone (Mimi), Sean Gilder (Paddy) and Samantha Siddall (Mandy), new members of the Maguire family were introduced. Firstly, Ciarán Griffiths took on the role of the homosexual yet homophobic Mickey Maguire. Aaron McCusker joined the cast as murderer Jamie Maguire, the oldest of the Maguire children who had been in prison for ten years, whilst Nicky Evans, who appeared in a guest role in Series 3, returned on a regular basis as Shane Maguire. All the Gallagher family returned, with Annabelle Apsion reprising her role as absentee mother Monica, which ultimately led to the departure of Maggie O'Neill's character Sheila Jackson. Dystin Johnson as Monica's lesbian lover, Norma Starkey, also returned as a regular cast member. With the introduction of Aaron McCusker as her new love interest, Rebecca Atkinson, who had played Karen Jackson since the first series, became a more prominent character, having been a recurring character during the second and third series. The Karib family also expanded in Series 4, with the arrivals of Kash and Yvonne's children, Chesney, played by Qasim Akhtar, and Meena, portrayed by Sarah Byrne, occurring in this series. The Chatsworth police became a more prominent focus in the series, with Michael Legge and Amanda Ryan portraying young police officers Tom O'Leary and Carrie Rogers, alongside original cast member Warren Donnelly as Stan Waterman.

=== Series 5 (2008) ===
The fifth series aired between 1 January 2008 to 15 April 2008. It consisted of 16 episodes, a big expansion from previous series.

=== Series 6 (2009) ===
The sixth series began on 27 January and concluded on 12 May 2009. Again, the series consisted of 16 episodes.

The series begins with Debbie's 16th birthday. Ian recovers from amnesia after being struck by a car, and decides he wants more from life than Chatsworth has to offer. Monica is suffering from post-natal depression after the birth of her and Frank's ninth child, Stella. Mickey enrolls in college, and discovers a talent for writing erotica. Maxine Donnelly, played by Joanna Higson, a spirited young auxiliary nurse, befriends both Carl and Debbie, and moves in with the Gallaghers. A parents' meeting at Liam's primary school affirms that Frank's youngest son is a genius. A rift develops in Jamie and Karen's marriage. Ben Batt joins the cast as villainous Joe Pritchard, the captain of the local football team, who begins a relationship with Mandy which ends in him becoming abusive. Additionally, he develops an obsession with Karen, leading to an affair, and when she falls pregnant in the last episode of the series, she does not know whether the father is Joe or Jamie. Maddison gets a boyfriend as Kash Karib for a single episode towards the end of the series, with his character being killed off in a fireworks explosion at the shop as his and Yvonne's lies became apparent to their children, Chesney and Meena. Paddy is held hostage by a mystery woman who gets him addicted to heroin. Things take a sinister turn when she gets Mandy involved, ultimately resulting in tragedy. Samantha Siddall left her role as Mandy Maguire in this series after being killed off in an explosion, coinciding with her father Paddy's heroin addiction storyline. Series 6 also saw the departures of Rebecca Ryan as Debbie Gallagher, Dystin Johnson as Norma Starkey and Sarah Byrne as Meena Karib, with Annabelle Apsion, also leaving her role as Monica Gallagher (returning for guest stints in later series). The tone of Series 6 was noticeably darker than previous series, something which continued into Series 7.

=== Series 7 (2010) ===
The seventh series began on 26 January 2010 and concluded on 11 May 2010. As with series 5 and 6, the seventh series consisted of 16 episodes.

Series 7 saw the arrivals of Libby Croker, played by Pauline McLynn, the next serious love interest for Frank, and her battleaxe mother, Patty, who uses a wheelchair, with Valerie Lilley taking on the role. This series also introduced Maxine's brother Bruce, who would only appear during this series. Also to arrive in Series 7 was Billy Tutton (Michael Taylor), a new love interest for Mimi, who would return as a regular in the following series. Sean Gilder left his role as Paddy Maguire towards the end of Series 7, with Warren Donnelly, Joanna Higson, Gerard Kearns and Ben Batt also leaving their roles as Stan Waterman, Maxine Donnelly, Ian Gallagher and Joe Pritchard. Kelli Hollis also left her role as Yvonne Karib, however she would return in the final series. In the series finale, Mimi surprisingly gave birth to baby Cilla, a storyline which would continue into the eighth series. Karen's bipolar disorder starts after her affair with Joe. Carl and Chesney being on the run for murder, and the wedding of Shane and Kelly are all prominent storylines to feature in the seventh series.

=== Series 8 (2011) ===
Unlike any previous series, the eighth series of 22 episodes was split into two halves. The first five episodes were aired consecutively during one week, from 10 to 14 January 2011, to tie in with a series-opener story-arc. After this, the series returned to its regular weekly slot, and continued for a further 8 episodes between 18 January to 8 March 2011. After a four-month break, the final 9 episodes of the eighth series began on 30 August 2011 and concluded the series on 25 October 2011.

Series 8 saw a variety of new characters arrive, including the Powell family, consisting of Emmanuel Ighodaro as Jackson, Karen Bryson as Jackson's wife Avril, and Kira Martin as their daughter Letitia. Also, Libby and Patty's relative, Aidan Croker, played by Robbie Conway, arrived to fill the hole left by Liam, following his departure in episode 2 of the series. Billy Tutton returned and is revealed as the father of Mimi's baby, Cilla, while Aysha Kala took on the role of Chesney's cousin, Sita Desai (a character that departed midway through the series). Annabelle Apsion reprised her role as Monica Gallagher for the early episodes of the series, to coincide with a storyline featuring Frank and Libby and the departure of Liam. Also departing this series was Libby, who left after realizing that Frank shows her no affection. Samantha Siddall returned as an apparition of her deceased character Mandy, who appeared as a vision to Mimi when she suffered from insomnia during this series. This series also saw the return of Jack Deam as Marty Fisher (who left the show in Series 4) as a regular cast member. When Frank finds himself being framed for brutally mugging a pensioner, Kev Ball (who also left the show in Series 4) returned to help, with Dean Lennox Kelly reprising the role for a single episode to mark the 100th episode.

=== Series 9 (2012) ===
The ninth series of Shameless began on 9 January 2012 and concluded on 13 March 2012. The ninth series, originally consisting of 22 episodes, was reduced to 11 episodes, with the remaining 11 being turned into the tenth series. Like 2011, the first two episodes aired on two consecutive nights.

The ninth series primarily featured the arrivals of Gloria Meak, played by Angeline Ball, and her brother, Dominic Meak, with former EastEnders actor Stephen Lord taking on this role. Gloria embarked on an affair with Jamie after having a fight with Karen. Also in Series 9, Mimi's glamorous Scottish niece, Ruby Hepburn, portrayed by Kari Corbett, arrived. Ciarán Griffiths left his role as Mickey Maguire during this series, with the character leaving after helping a woman give birth and agreeing to raise the baby when the woman dies. Also departing this series was Carl, who made numerous guest appearances before leaving. Prominent storylines for this series include Mickey being the victim of a homophobic attack, and Frank, Jamie, Shane, Ruby and Aidan being trapped underground when a plan to rob lottery tickets goes dramatically wrong.

=== Series 10 (2012) ===
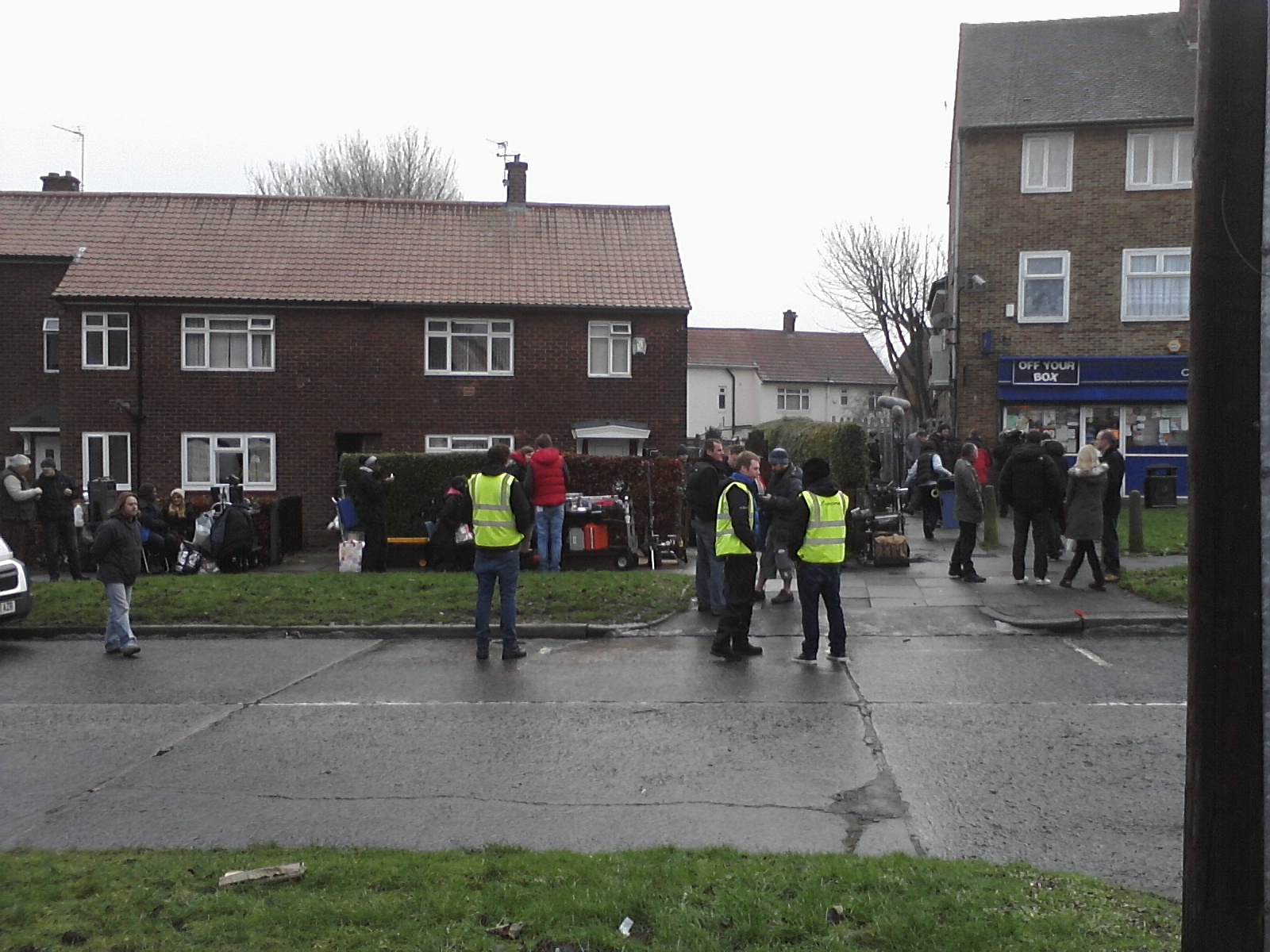
Shooting for Shameless, series 10, episode 2, Wythenshawe, Manchester, England

Series 10, originally planned to be the second half of the ninth series, was reduced from 11 episodes to 10. It aired between 13 September and 1 November 2012. As with the last two series, the first two episodes aired on two consecutive nights.

The final episode of the tenth series saw three prominent characters depart: Emmanuel Ighodaro left his role as Jackson Powell when he and Avril's mounting debts and fractured marriage become too much; Kari Corbett's character Ruby Hepburn took Mimi hostage which resulted in Ruby falling out of a window to her death; Valerie Lilley made her exit as Patty Croker, when she was told that she was dying and wanted Frank to take her to the beach to see Ireland one last time. Frank left her to go to the pub, allowing the tide to take her away. Jamie continued his affair with Gloria into Series 10, ultimately stopping it following a pregnancy scare combined with Karen discovers his deceit. Shane accidentally killed a man in a hit-and-run and battled his conscience as he helped the man's family through their grief.

=== Series 11 (2013) ===
The eleventh and final series of Shameless began on 26 February 2013 and concluded the show itself on 28 May 2013. An expansion from the last two series, the eleventh series consisted of 14 episodes. The show's final episode saw the return of several departed characters, mostly consisting of the Gallagher children.

During the eleventh series, all characters made their final appearances, whereas only certain characters made exits from Chatsworth. These include Sally Carman as Kelly Maguire, Jack Deam as Marty Fisher, Angeline Ball as Gloria Meak and Stephen Lord as Dominic Meak. A variety of new characters made their first appearances in the final series, including Jacqueline Boatswain as Avril's older sister Patreesha St. Rose and her daughter Mary-Mae, who would begin a relationship with Chesney. Also, Moya Brady – who played The Jockey's former landlady Cassie Western in Series 2 – returned playing Remona, who opened a pharmacy in Chesney's shop. A new family, the Blancos, arrived consisting of Kassi, played by Jalaal Hartley, Esther, portrayed by Isy Suttie, and their three children: Tam (Rhys Cadman), Thalia (Jade Kilduff) and Saul (Lewis Hardaker). Also, Sherilee and Derilee, played by Sarah Totty and Sue Vincent, appeared for a number of episodes as Frank's new prostitutes.

Most notably, the role of Stella Gallagher was recast with Nikita Brownlee. The final ever episode saw numerous old cast members return, including Annabelle Apsion as Monica Gallagher, Anne-Marie Duff as Fiona McBride, Jody Latham as Lip Gallagher, Elliott Tittensor as Carl Gallagher, Dean Lennox Kelly as Kev Ball and Kelli Hollis as Yvonne Karib. Storylines covered in the final series included Jamie discovering that Paddy is not his biological father, and finding his new half-brother Kassi and his family; Frank's dalliance with prostitutes Sherilee and Derilee, with a hostage situation occurring at the Gallagher household when Derilee's husband Baxter finds out; Shane's brief relationship with a copper, Sgt. Randall (Thaila Zucchi), putting a strain on his relationship with his family; Mimi starting work at a primary school as a governor; the breakdown of Kelly and Lillian's friendship after Kelly and Marty steal a large amount of money from her.

== Setting ==
The Gallagher family resides at 2 Windsor Gardens on the fictional Chatsworth Estate, a deprived council estate in Stretford, Greater Manchester. Originally the show was filmed on location on the corner of Wenlock way and Clowes Street in West Gorton in East Manchester and at the Pie Factory Studios in Salford. Some scenes were also filmed in the Wythenshawe area in the south of the city.

After Series 5, the show was filmed at a purpose-built set on the Roundthorn Industrial Estate in South Manchester, on the site of an old Umbro warehouse, and around Wythenshawe and Sale.

== Cast ==
Shameless initially focused on the layabout Frank Gallagher and the lives of his six children, Fiona, Lip, Ian, Carl, Debbie, Liam, Fiona's boyfriend Steve, and the family's next door neighbours, Kev and Veronica. Later the Maguire family was introduced: Paddy, his wife, Mimi, and their three sons—Jamie, Shane and Mickey—and daughter, Mandy. The Maguires became the focus of the show as the Gallagher children departed. Other characters also become the focus after only starting off as minor characters, such as those from the Karib family.

== Awards and nominations ==
In April 2005, the programme's first series won the Best Drama Series category at the British Academy Television Awards. It was also nominated for Best British Drama at the National Television Awards 2007, but lost out to Doctor Who. Shameless won an award at the Royal Television Awards Society North West Awards 2007 where it beat Coronation Street to the Best Continuing Drama Award.

== Distribution ==
The programme has been sold overseas, where it airs on channels such as SBS One (Australia), UKTV (New Zealand), Acht (Belgium), I.Sat (Argentina), Showcase (Canada), Virgin 17 (France), Nederland 3 (Netherlands), YLE FST5 (Finland), SIC Radical (Portugal), RTÉ Two (Ireland), BBC America and Sundance Channel (United States), yes+ (Israel), I.Sat (Latin America), Jimmy (Italy), and Netflix.

== Adaptations ==
=== American version ===
HBO began developing an American version of Shameless after striking a deal with John Wells.

By October 2009, the development had moved to Showtime. John Wells Productions filmed a pilot episode for the cable network in January 2010. Set in the Back of the Yards neighborhood on the south side of Chicago, it stars William H. Macy in the Frank Gallagher role. Allison Janney was cast as a romantic interest for Frank, but left after taking a job on Matthew Perry's Mr. Sunshine and was unable to be a part of both series. Joan Cusack joined the cast as the new Sheila Jackson, along with Emmy Rossum as Frank's sensible and feisty eldest daughter, and Justin Chatwin as a car thief who falls for her. Showtime's Shameless cast also includes Jeremy Allen White, Cameron Monaghan, Emma Kenney, Ethan Cutkosky, Noel Fisher, Steve Howey and Shanola Hampton. The first episode of the series aired on Showtime on 9 January 2011. The American version has received critical acclaim and some of Showtime's highest recorded ratings. Like its predecessor, the American adaptation ran for 11 seasons before the series ended in April 2021, making it the network's longest-running original-scripted program.

=== Turkish version ===
In September 2017, Fox Turkey began airing the adaptation Bizim Hikaye (transl. Our Story) starring Hazal Kaya and Burak Deniz.

=== Russian version ===
On 24 September 2017, NTV began airing a Russian adaptation titled Besstydniki, Russian for Shameless.

=== Indian version ===
On 18 August 2025, Sony SAB began airing an Indian adaptation titled Itti Si Khushi (transl. A Little Bit of Happiness) starring Sumbul Touqeer Khan and Rajat Verma.
