= The Story Makers =

Children's television series

- Genre: Children's
- Created by: Clare Bradley; Tony Reed
- Developed by: BBC MediaArc
- Starring: Nick Mercer; Aliex Yuill; Danny John-Jules; Michael Offei; Dystin Johnson; Lauretta Nkwocha; Joe Vera; Paul J. Medford; Tim Jones; Robin Fritz and others
- Narrated by: Gary Martin; Stephen Cannon; Aliex Yuill and others
- Theme music composer: Francis Haines
- Opening theme: Francis Haines; Clare Bradley
- Composers: Francis Haines; Liz Kitchen
- Country of origin: United Kingdom
- Original language: English
- No. of series: 4
- No. of episodes: 245 (list of episodes)

Production
- Executive producers: Annette Williams; Clare Elstow
- Producers: Clare Bradley; Tony Reed
- Camera setup: Multi-camera
- Running time: 15 minutes (Series 1); 20 minutes (Series 2–4)
- Production company: BBC

Original release
- Network: CBeebies
- Release: 11 February 2002 – 27 March 2004

The Story Makers is a British children's television series that was broadcast on the BBC's pre-school digital television network, CBeebies. The Story Makers is set in a children's library, and encourages literacy and creativity.

== Programme ==
The programme is set in a library that comes to life at night, where the puppets Jelly and Jackson and a member of the Wordsworth family create stories using a "Story Machine". At the stroke of midnight, Jackson and Jelly (pink and green puppets who live in the library and hide in the daytime) come out and are joined by a presenter, one of the members of the Wordsworth family, who recites "The sun is down, the stars are bright, Story Makers come out at night" as they appear. The Wordsworths together with Jelly and Jackson are the Story Makers.

Objects found in the library or appearing by magic are put into the top of the story machine (transformed from a desktop computer); Jelly, Jackson and the story maker then recite "Imagine, imagine, imagine a story!" and the story machine makes a book containing a story based on the object. The story in the book is then "read out" (although this is replaced on screen by live action or an animation). The stories that appear are a Playbook (live action segments with young children) and the remaining stories are animated (traditional animation, stop-motion animation or puppets). The characters in the stories are fairly consistent, including Sniff and Wag (two puppet dogs), Blue Cow (a cartoon cow, created by Blue Zoo Animation) and Kevin the Spaceman and his dog, Spanner (puppets). There is always a Blue Cow story and a Playbook – the other story varies between each episode.

As dawn begins and the sun rises, the Story Maker takes his or her leave and recites "Dawn is upon us, the morning is nigh, we've made our stories and we bid you, goodbye!" and disappears. Jelly and Jackson hide and the story machine turns back into a computer, but the books produced overnight remain for the librarian and children to find when the library opens at 9am. From Series 2 to 4, Jelly and Jackson sometimes look at what the kids or the librarian are doing during the credits and hide to make it look like they are invisible to the humans, but this never happened in Series 1.

=== Stories ===
Each episode features a Playbook segment with real children and a Blue Cow story, alongside a rotating selection of other animated or puppet story strands such as Kevin the Spaceman and Barnacle Rock. The other story rotates from the list below:

- Kevin the Spaceman (appears in every series): Stories about Spaceman Kevin and his dog Spanner visiting various planets.
- Sniff and Wag (appears in every series): Stories about dogs Sniff and Wag who visit a park at night.
- Barnacle Rock (appears in Series 1–3): Stories about sea creatures finding something on the ocean floor.
- Jack Sprat and Treacle Cat (only appears in Series 1): Stories about Jack Sprat, a rat with a cockney accent, and his friend Treacle Cat who live in a garbage bin.
- Tales from Faraway (only appears in Series 1): Stories, original and traditional, that use shadow puppets.
- The Poons (only appears in Series 1): Stories about various kitchen tools and appliances.
- Super Baby (only appears in Series 4): Stories about a baby superhero.
- The Three Bears (appears in Series 3–4): A subversion of Goldilocks and the Three Bears where the Bears are visited by someone other than Goldilocks, though she does appear in one episode. Every story ends with Mother Bear putting something new on her porridge.
- Rainforest Tales (only appears in Series 2): Stories about the adventures of animals in a rainforest.

== Characters ==
=== Wordsworth Family Members ===
The main live action presenters are the Wordsworths:

- Milton Wordsworth – played by Danny John-Jules (appears in every series except Series 2).
- Byron Wordsworth – played by Michael Offei (appears in Series 2–4).
- Shelley Wordsworth – played by Lauretta Nkwocha (appears in Series 2–4).
- Rossetti Wordsworth – played by Dystin Johnson (appears in Series 2–4).
- Webster Wordsworth – played by Joe Vera (appears in Series 2–4).
- Blake Wordsworth – played by Paul J. Medford (appears in Series 2-4).

In Series 1, Milton Wordsworth was the only live action presenter.

=== Others ===
- The Librarian appears at the beginning and end of the programme, sometimes female, sometimes male.
- Children in the library appear at the beginning and end of the programme except Series 1.
- Playbook children appear in every series.
- Blue Cow appears in all of the episodes where she is always curious about the world outside her farm.

=== Puppets ===
The show also featured two puppets:

- Jackson (voiced by Nick Mercer) is a pink horse who is the adoptive big brother to Jelly. He is six years old and wears pink velcros.
- Jelly (voiced by Aliex Yuill) is a green porcupine with long quills, who is Jackson's adopted younger sister. She is three years old.

The puppets have also appeared on CBeebies Springwatch and CBeebies Autumnwatch. Jelly was also a recurring character in Green Balloon Club, another show that aired on CBeebies.

In 2007, Jelly and Jackson appeared as contestants on a puppet special of The Weakest Link hosted by Anne Robinson which was originally broadcast on 28 December on BBC One, and they were voted off after Round 6.

== Home media ==
In 2004, two VHS tapes and DVDs containing episodes from the first series were released by the Contender Entertainment Group under license from the BBC. The first volume contained five episodes from the series, and the second release was a "Bumper Special", featuring ten episodes, five on each VHS tape/DVD.
