= Asifa Lahore =

British drag queen

- Born: Asif Quraishi; 1982 or 1983 (age 42–43)
- Occupation: Drag queen

Asifa Lahore (born Asif Quraishi; 1982 or 1983) is a British Muslim trans woman who has been described as Britain's first out Muslim drag queen.

== Personal life ==
Brought up in Southall, London, Lahore is from a Pakistani Muslim family and has spoken about the difficulty in coming out to her parents when she was 23 years old. Her parents first sent her to the doctor and then to their local imam. Lahore was coerced into a relationship with a first cousin in Pakistan in an attempt to change Lahore's sexual orientation. After six months, during which she sought counselling and assistance from LGBT groups, Lahore terminated the relationship. Lahore is a practising Muslim, saying: "I go to the mosque. I fast at Ramadan. I've been on pilgrimage". She has said that her mother now watches and enjoys her drag shows.

In 2009, while still identifying as a gay man, Lahore entered a civil partnership with a man of Pakistani heritage in a large ceremony. In 2014, months after the legalisation of same-sex marriage in the United Kingdom, they converted their civil partnership to a marriage. As of 2017, the two were undergoing a divorce by mutual consent.

In May 2017, Lahore came out as a trans woman. In the same year, she commented on a then-recent wedding which was claimed to be the first same-sex Muslim marriage in Britain, saying: "I'm glad this young boy has declared so openly about his marriage, but [I] want him to know there have been others before him, and will be many more". In 2021, she spoke about being visually impaired.

== Career ==
Lahore became involved in drag in 2011, when she was 27 years old. She says she was first inspired to embrace drag by her mother's elaborate saris. Her performances often reference aspects of her Muslim culture. Those performances include wearing rainbow-coloured hijabs and "a signature stripping act that features a burqa".

In 2014, Lahore was to discuss her experience as a gay Muslim on BBC Three's Free Speech programme. This segment was not aired, following security concerns and because the programme makers did not discuss the segment with the mosque in which the show was being filmed. In 2015, she featured in Muslim Drag Queens, a Channel 4 documentary film, narrated by Ian McKellen. The programme was watched by over 1 million people in the UK. In 2016, she featured on BBC Asian Network where she performed "Punjabi Girl", a parody of Barbie Girl. In 2023, Darius Shu and Shiva Raichandani filmed Always Asifa, a TV documentary featuring Lahore commissioned by Together TV.
