= A Peaceful Killing =

Song by Matthew Barton

Single by Matthew Barton and Darius Shu
- Genre: Indie folk; Acoustic
- Length: 5:28
- Label: Self-released
- Songwriters: Darius Shu, Matthew Barton
- Producer: Matthew Barton

"A Peaceful Killing" is a song recorded by British singer-songwriter Matthew Barton. It was self-released digitally under Silverprince Pictures. The song was written by Darius Shu, Barton, and produced by Barton himself, and mixed and mastered by Sam Wain. Arron Blake and Darius Shu, director of the 2021 film I AM Norman, approached the singer to contribute an original song to the film.

A music video for the track was released on YouTube. Critical response to the song was generally positive.

== Composition and Lyrics ==
A Peaceful Killing is an indie-folk ballad with folk-pop influences. In an interview, Barton said that “The imagery in the song rests on the tension between the beautiful and the brutal. I think it represents our lives in general.” Shu said that he "...had in mind to capture the feeling of what I was feeling this year when everything we had planned for 2020 came to a halt. I'm sure many people felt the same way as I did. To put those emotions through poetic lyrics in a song, that there will be light and hope and how all this chaos in the world can be so painful yet confusing to an individual." Barton delivers a "haunting" vocal performance with a stunning, cinematic piano line along with the imagery created by the lyrics, this friction really hones in on the idea that life can be simultaneously kind and cruel, in equal measure.

== Critical reception ==
Chalkpit Records praised the song as, "A torrent of movielike musicality...'A Peaceful Killing" should soundtrack more than just a movie this winter." Matthew Barton describes the song as "a song tensions between the ‘beautiful and the brutal". YMX MusicBlog compared the track to the darkly dramatic vocal delivery of Tori Amos and the blissfully bare atmosphere created in the work of Sufjan Stevens. IndyReviews complimented how the song is a beautiful denouement that immediately provokes chills. Rich piano melodies are woven through the choral echoes of the lyrics creating a perfect reflection of the man resigned to carry the souls of those who couldn’t bear the weight alone."

== Promotion and music video ==
A music video for "A Peaceful Killing" was released on Silverprince Pictures' YouTube channel. The video featured scenes of a man carrying a body, grieving and giving respect of losing his loved ones."

== Track listings and formats ==
- Digital download
1. "A Peaceful Killing" – 5:28
