= Darius Shu =

British cinematographer (born 1994)

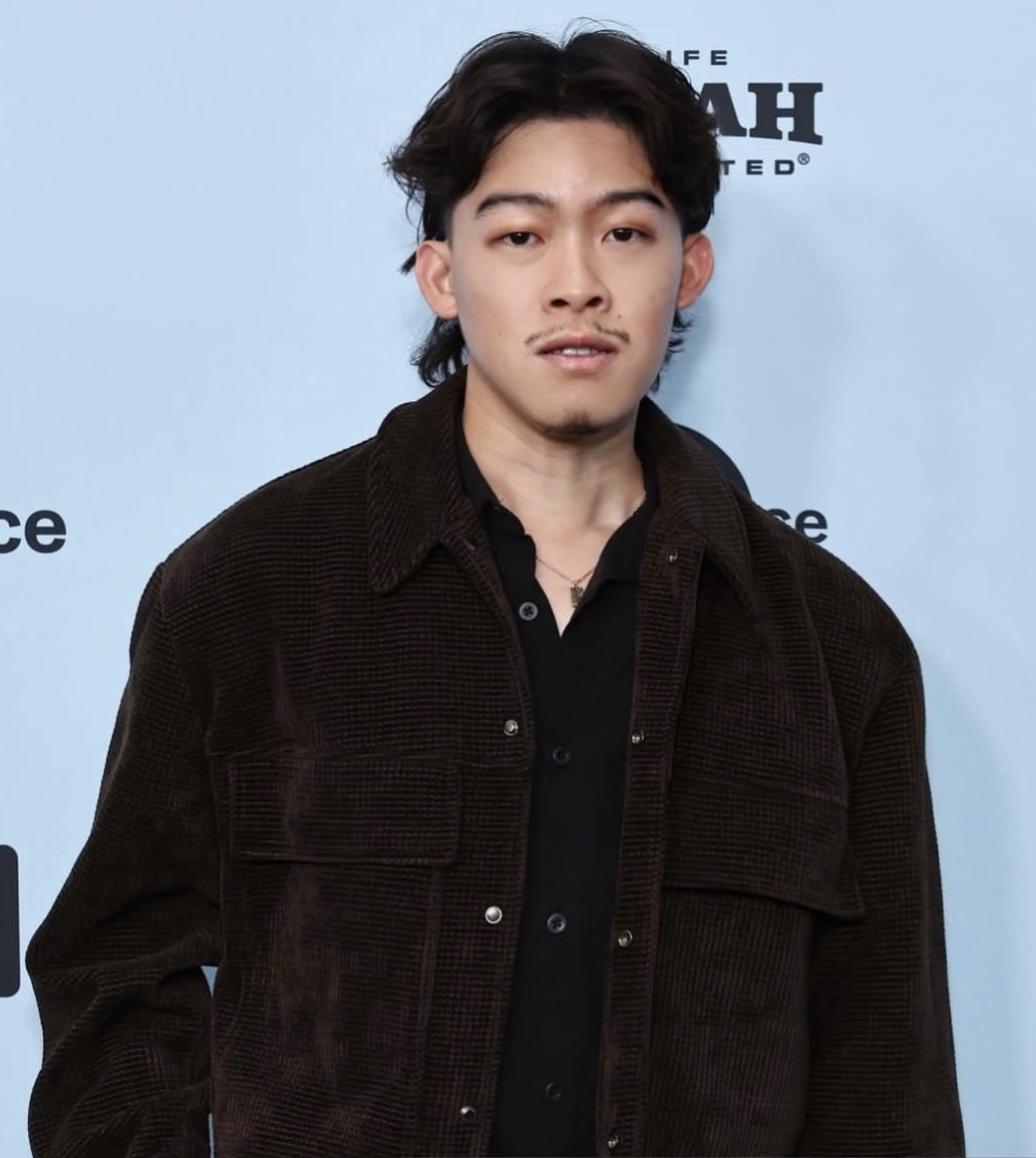
- Shu at the 2025 Sundance Film Festival
- Born: 5 May 1994 (age 32)
- Education: University of the West of England; Arts University Bournemouth
- Occupations: Cinematographer; film director; producer
- Years active: 2012–present
- Website: www.dariusshu.com

Darius Shu (born 5 May 1994) is a British cinematographer, film director and producer. He is best known for his work on the films Last Days, Molly, Where We Came From, His Hands and Secret Child. His directorial debut short film His Hands premiered at Tribeca Festival 2019 and was nominated for Best Narrative Short. Always, Asifa, a documentary film he shot was nominated for a British Academy Television Award. He received his first BSC nomination for his cinematography work on Molly. Shu is the founder of Silverprince Pictures.

== Early life ==
Shu started his career as a portrait photographer when he was 18. He studied at the University of the West of England and graduated in 2015 with a Bachelors of Arts in Media and Journalism. In 2018, he received a Masters of Arts in Film Production specialising in cinematography at Arts University Bournemouth.

== Career ==
While studying at the Bournemouth Film School, Shu served as cinematographer on Pardaa (2017), directed by Kajri Babbar. The film became a semi-finalist at the 44th Student Academy Awards in Los Angeles and premiered at the Aesthetica Short Film Festival.

In 2017, Shu was approached by producer Gordon Lewis and director Yew Weng Ho to shoot the short film Secret Child, based on Lewis's memoir of the same name. It had its world premiere at Hollyshorts Film Festival 2018, where it also received a nomination for Best Period Piece.

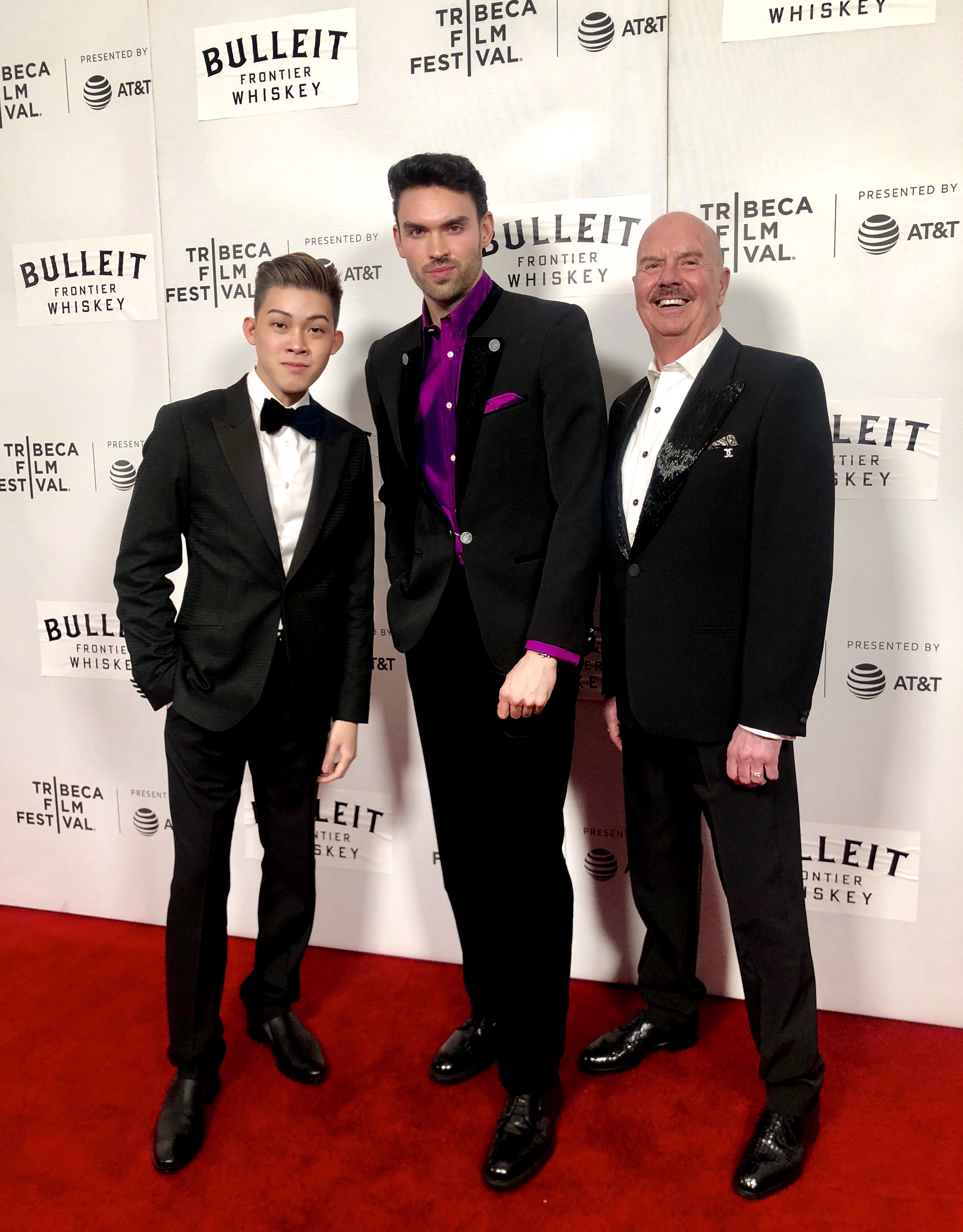
Shu (left) with Arron Blake and Philip Brisebois at the red carpet premiere of His Hands at Tribeca Film Festival 2019, New York

In 2018, Shu collaborated with Arron Blake to co-write, co-direct and produce His Hands (2019), while also serving as cinematographer. The film had its world premiere at the Tribeca Festival 2019 at the Village East Cinema in New York and received a nomination for Best Narrative Short. His Hands was later released on Amazon Prime Video and Dekkoo. Following this, Shu founded the production company Silverprince Pictures to develop independent films.

Shu reunited with director Yew Weng Ho and producer Gordon Lewis on the short film Mical (2020), which focused on raising awareness of dyslexia in support of the Dyslexia Trust. The film was officially selected at LA Shorts International Film Festival 2020. It premiered on YouTube, where it received positive reception and has since amassed over 1.7 million views.

Shu co-directed and produced I AM Norman alongside Arron Blake and was officially selected to world premiere at Rhode Island International Film Festival.

Shu collaborated with director Shiva Raichandani on the drama-musical film Queer Parivaar and Stockholm, directed by Tom Wright, both went on to world premiere at BFI Flare 2022. Later that year, Shu shot fashion films for The Laterals featuring Lily James, Kaya Scodelario and Gemma Chan for The Laterals.

In 2021, Shu directed and shot the music video for Billy Cullum's single “Kiss Away”, featuring Omari Douglas. Shu also directed and shot the music video of RuPaul's Drag Race UK winner The Vivienne's latest single "Bitch on Heels", written by Diane Warren. The music video was describe as "...one of the fiercest clips of the year". That year he also produced and shot the television short film Sent to Cov, directed by Tom Wright, that was broadcast on Sky Arts.

Shu served as cinematographer on Shiva Raichandani's Netflix documentary Peach Paradise (2022) The documentary was nominated for Best International at Iris Prize 2023. Shu directed and shot the music video for Tia Kofi’s single “Loving Me Like That”. He also shot an editorial film with Léa Seydoux for L’Officiel, produced in conjunction with the release of No Time to Die and Wes Anderson's The French Dispatch.

In 2022, Queer Parivaar won Best British Short at the Iris Prize and was broadcast on Film4. The film screened at over 20 international festivals, including BFI Flare and Outfest Los Angeles, and toured the UK as part of the Iris on the Move programme. That year, Shu also shot the Pride in London 2022 commercial, filmed the Queer Britain campaign The Place to Be Seen, and directed and shot a commercial for Lee Kum Kee Europe featuring BAFTA-winning television personality Big Zuu. He later reunited with Raichandani to shoot the television film Always Asifa and was nominated for Best Short Form Programme at the BAFTA TV Awards 2023.

In 2024, Shu shot Where We Came From, starring Emmy Award-winning actress Archie Panjabi, which premiered at the Tasveer Film Festival. He also served as second unit director of photography on Justin Lin’s film Last Days, starring Sky Yang, Toby Wallace, Radhika Apte, Marny Kennedy and Ken Leung. which premiered at the 2025 Sundance Film Festival. In the same year, he shot Sky Yang’s debut feature film, Slim, which also marked Shu’s first feature as a cinematographer. He also worked in creating promotional films for New Earth Theatre.

In 2025, Darius's solo directorial sci-fi thriller short film PLOP had its world premiere at Manchester Film Festival 2025. Shu produced and filmed the film Cuddle, directed by Arron Blake and stars Mark Gatiss. Shu wrote and directed his latest British East Asian romantic drama film, Molly, and premiered at the BAFTA and BIFA qualifying British Urban Film Festival 2026 and Queer East Festival in London. The film won the Best British Film at Iris Prize 2026 and will is now streaming on Channel 4.

Shu received his first BSC nomination by the British Society of Cinematographers for his cinematography work on Molly.

== Music ==
Shu co-wrote the original soundtrack, A Peaceful Killing, with singer-songwriter Matthew Barton for Arron Blake and Shu's film, I AM Norman (2021). Chalkpit Records praised the song as: "A torrent of movielike musicality...A Peaceful Killing should soundtrack more than just a movie this winter". Matthew Barton describe the song as "a song tensions between the beautiful and the brutal". Shu said he had in mind to capture the feeling of how everyone felt in 2020 and wanted to create a soundtrack that will complement the film's story through its poetic lyrics. YMX MusicBlog compared the track to the darkly dramatic vocal delivery of Tori Amos and the blissfully bare atmosphere created in the work of Sufjan Stevens.

== Filmmaking ==
Shu's work, according to one critic, is characterised by richly textured imagery, paintings inspired, symbolic and stylish that complements the use of music and sound. Film Ink describe Shu's work in His Hands as '...closer to the works of Kenneth Anger than anything else, pushing and colliding all these contrasting ideas and thematic glyphs, shattering the audience in the process and leaving them to pick up the pieces... instils absolute trust in its audience to understand its emotional wavelength, and the technical craft on display allows the audience to return it in kind; it is art as it should be.'' Viddy Well identified Shu's filmmaking and direction as "... taut and controlled, with notes of Nicolas Winding Refn, David Lynch, Denis Villeneuve, and David Fincher" and admired how he is able to "... impressively conjure up a film that has more in common with a painting hanging in a museum than it does with most contemporary narrative features." Shu said in an interview with The Sun that he is drawn to stories that depict the existential and exploration of identity, humanity and social construct and "...is always fascinated to create something fresh out of something ordinary, to have his characters deal with the presence of anxiety, and be morally ambiguous.” The Sun states that "...Shu's films often portray radical themes hinging on the polarised context of socio modern issues."

== Recognition ==
Matthew Barton from Attitude praised His Hands (2019), calling Shu's cinematography "... beautiful, modern and stylish." The Star praised Shu as, "a cinematographer who shoots to make things and people stand out." The Advocate magazine pointed out that, "the cinematography of His Hands offers an unnerving experience through dark, haunting images with no dialogue." Cain Noble-Davies from Film Ink called Shu's work as, "cinema in its purest form, where the audience is meant to rely solely on visual and pictorial literacy to make heads or tails of any of it ... using all of one camera on-set, and it is almost insane just how much skill is on display ... able to make every single frame count, and the imagery lying in wait here is astounding in how layered it is." Dave Adamson from Vulture Hound praised Shu's camera work in his film as, "not exploitative ... the cinematography hints at desire, not feral lust." Adamson called Shu's cinematography as "powerful" and "masters the art of the unseen....it is a wonderful work of art. Very much like a painting in a gallery." Adrianna Jakimowicz from The Movie Buff describes Shu's work as "beautifully shot". Mark Gatiss, the producer of Netflix-BBC television series Dracula and Sherlock, reviewed Shu's film His Hands as: "A beguilingly beautiful gem, Arron Blake and Darius Shu's His Hands defies easy analysis. Shot through with strange, homoerotic melancholy it's ravishing to look at and haunts the memory long after."

Sristi Gayen from Indie Short Mag describe Shu's cinematography in Secret Child as "...splendid, a gorgeous forerunner of his 2019 magnum opus His Hands". Film Threat praised Shu's work as, "glorious cinematography, beautifully well shot, exuding a mysterious atmosphere in each frame" while Unsettled magazine called His Hands, "a masterpiece built on suspense and appealing imagery."

Chris Olson from UK Film Review complemented the "splendid visual moments" in His Hands and applauded Shu "turning in some excellent cinematography as well as some clever framing." HeyUGuys stated that Shu is able to "create a mood of eeriness and mystery that often makes you shudder" and that his "editing and directing are brilliant." Indy Reviews highlights that Darius' cinematography in Mical as "...capturing every fibre of emotion with aching rawness." Omeleto states that Shu's cinematography in Secret Child is "...carefully composed, evocative images and an almost stately sense of craftsmanship, the often luminous images have a classicism that also matches the elegant, measured storytelling."

I AM Norman was highly praised by Alex Clement from HeyUGuys as a "masterpiece...well executed and beautifully captured" and "... carries certain essences of the likes of Tarantino, Hitchcock and Kubrick and seems like a fusion of all three." Norman Gidney from Film Threat described I Am Norman as "...a refined piece of work".

== Filmography ==
=== Films ===
Year	Title	Director	Notes
2016	Pardaa	Kajri Babbar	
2016	Narcissus Revisited	Caspar Muller	
2018	Secret Child	Yew Weng Ho	
2019	His Hands	Arron Blake, Darius Shu	
2020	Mical	Yewweng Ho	
2021	I Am Norman	Arron Blake, Darius Shu	
2021	Dogging	Arron Blake, Darius Shu	Mini-Series
2021	Stockholm	Tom Wright	
2022	Queer Parivaar	Shiva Raichandani	
2022	Peach Paradise	Shiva Raichandani	Netflix Original Documentary
2022	Sent to Cov	Tom Wright	Sky Arts TV Film
2022	Always, Asifa	Shiva Raichandani	
2024	The Lime Green Shirt	Kaushik Ray	
2024	Still	Ravenna Tran	
2024	The White Hart	Sky Yang	
2024	Where We Came From	Harnick Virk	
2025	PLOP	Darius Shu	
2025	Last Days	Justin Lin	2nd Unit Director of Photography
2025	Dear Google	Sky Yang	
2026	Before The Leaves Fall	Jarvis Laurence	
2026	The Algorithm of Loss	Levi Eddie Aluede	
2026	Out Laws	James Lewis & Lexi Powner	Feature Documentary
2026	Cuddle	Arron Blake	
2026	Molly	Darius Shu	
2026	Megumi	Hiroki Berrecloth	
TBA	Oyakodon	Georgie Yukiko Donovan	
TBA	Bodies	Levi Eddie Aluede	
TBA	Slim	Sky Yang	

=== Music videos ===
Year	Title	Artist	Role
2021	Kiss Away	Billy Cullum	Director, cinematographer
2021	Bitch on Heels	The Vivienne	Director, cinematographer
2021	Hard Heart Work	Billy Cullum	Director, cinematographer
2021	Loving Me Like That	Tia Kofi	Director, cinematographer
2022	Forget Me Not	Celestial Skies	Director, cinematographer
2022	Leng Char Siu	Big Zuu	Director, cinematographer
2022	The Lost Art of Conversation	Celestial Skies	Director, cinematographer
2022	Modern Romance	Celestial Skies	Director, cinematographer
2022	A Terrible Lie	Celestial Skies	Director, cinematographer
2023	Gold	Billy Cullum	Director, cinematographer
2024	Deja Vu	Jason Kwan	Director, cinematographer
2024	Paradise	Jason Kwan	Director, cinematographer

== Awards and nominations ==
=== Film festivals ===
Year	Festival	Category	Work	Result
2017	Aesthetica Short Film Festival	Nahemi Short Film Award	Pardaa	Nominated
2017	Calcutta International Cult Film Festival	Best Short Film	Pardaa	Won
2017	Sydney Indie Film Festival	Best Drama	Pardaa	Won
2017	Student Academy Awards	Best Foreign Film	Pardaa	Nominated
2018	Hollyshorts Film Festival	Best Period Piece	Secret Child	Nominated
2018	Alternative Film Festival	Best Period Piece	Secret Child	Nominated
2018	Los Angeles Independent Film Festival Awards	Best Cinematography	Secret Child	Nominated
2018	Los Angeles Independent Film Festival Awards	Best Drama Short	Secret Child	Won
2018	New Renaissance Film Festival	Best Debut Film	Secret Child	Won
2018	Gold Movie Awards	Best Short Film	Secret Child	Won
2018	Festigious International Film Festival	Best Cinematography	Secret Child	Won
2018	Festigious International Film Festival	Best Narrative Short	Secret Child	Won
2018	European Cinematography Awards	Best Short Film	Secret Child	Won
2018	Bucharest ShortCut Cinefest	Best Cinematography	Secret Child	Won
2018	Bucharest ShortCut Cinefest	Best Film	Secret Child	Won
2018	Kerry Film Festival	Best Short Film	Secret Child	Nominated
2018	Largo Film Awards	Best Cinematography	Secret Child	Won
2018	Oniros Film Awards	Best Cinematography	Secret Child	Nominated
2018	Sydney Indie Film Festival	Best Film	Secret Child	Nominated
2018	Gold Movie Awards	Best Cinematography	His Hands	Won
2019	Tribeca Film Festival	Best Narrative Short	His Hands	Nominated
2019	Canada Shorts Film Festival	Award of Excellence	His Hands	Won
2019	London International Motion Pictures Award	Best Narrative / Fiction UK Short Film	His Hands	Nominated
2019	Queen Palm International Film Festival	Best Cinematography	His Hands	Won
2019	Queen Palm International Film Festival	Best Short Film - Silent	His Hands	Won
2020	Maryland International Film Festival	Best Short Film	Mical	Nominated
2020	LA Shorts International Film Festival	Best Short Film	Mical	Nominated
2020	Manhattan Film Festival	Best Short Film	Mical	Nominated
2021	Rhode Island International Film Festival	Best LGBTQ Film	I AM Norman	Nominated
2022	Iris Prize LGBT+ Film Festival	Best British Film	Queer Parivaar	Won
2022	BFI Flare LGBTQIA+ Film Festival	Official Selection	Queer Parivaar	Nominated
2022	BFI Flare LGBTQIA+ Film Festival	Official Selection	Stockholm	Nominated
2022	LA LGBTQ+ International Film Festival	Best Cinematography	Stockholm	Won
2022	Iris Prize LGBT+ Film Festival	Best International	Peach Paradise	Nominated
2023	BAFTA TV Awards	Best Short Form Programme	Always, Asifa	Nominated
2024	BFI Flare LGBTQIA+ Film Festival	Official Selection	The Lime Green Shirt	Nominated
2024	Tasveer Film Festival	Official Selection	Where We Came From	Nominated
2025	Sundance Film Festival	Official Selection	Last Days	Nominated
2025	Manchester Film Festival	Official Selection	PLOP	Nominated
2025	Manchester Film Festival	Official Selection	Where We Came From	Nominated
2026	British Urban Film Festival	Official Selection	Molly	Nominated
2026	Queer East Festival	Official Selection	Molly	Nominated
2026	Sunderland Shorts Film Festival	Honourable Mention	Molly	Winner
2026	Roze Filmdagen	Official Selection	Molly	Nominated
2026	KASHISH Pride Film Festival	Best International Narrative	Molly	Nominated
2026	Iris Prize LGBT+ Film Festival	Best British Film	Molly	Won
2026	British Society of Cinematographers	Cinematography in Short Film	Molly	Nominated
