= List of people on the cover of Attitude magazine =

This is a list of people who have appeared on the front cover of Attitude, a gay lifestyle magazine that is printed monthly in the United Kingdom. If the person is openly LGBT, their identity will be mentioned in parentheses; sources can be found in the people's articles.

== Statistics ==
As of May 2010, Attitude created 151 magazines of which 106 covers have been dedicated to straight celebrities or politicians. Only 45 covers have been dedicated to gay celebrities. The longest stretch straight celebrities have not appeared on the cover is two months. Editor Matthew Todd has claimed has suggested there are not enough famous gay people to have them on the cover constantly and has made a point of putting celebrities on the cover such as Beth Ditto (first gay woman on an Attitude cover) and Kele Okereke (first black gay man on an Attitude cover). In January 2020, activists Yasmin Benoit and Anick Soni became the first asexual and intersex people on the cover, respectively.

== Covers ==
Date	Cover	Notes
May 1994	Boy George (gay)	First issue
June 1994	Peter Cunnah	Lead singer of D:Ream
July 1994	Pedro Almodóvar (gay)	
August 1994	Neil Tennant (gay)	Lead vocalist of the Pet Shop Boys
September 1994	Diana Ross	
October 1994	Suede (lead singer Brett Anderson is bisexual)	
November 1994	Naomi Campbell	
December 1994	Jean-Paul Gaultier (had a boyfriend)	
January 1995	Marc Almond (gay)	
February 1995	Oscar Wilde (gay)	
March 1995	Marcus Schenkenberg	
April 1995	Brad Pitt	
July 1995	Chris O'Donnell	
August 1995	Madonna (bisexual)	
October 1995	Matt Dillon	
November 1995	Jarvis Cocker	Lead singer of Pulp
December 1995	Damon Albarn	Lead singer of Blur (queer/has not put label)
February 1996	Tony Mortimer	From East 17
May 1996	Stephen Dorff	
June 1996	George Clooney	
July 1996	Robbie Williams	
August 1996	Ross Kemp	
September 1996	Roy Fairhurst	
October 1996	Anthony McPartlin & Declan Donnelly	
January 1997	Jonathan Kerrigan	Appeared in Casualty
April 1997	Paul Sculfor	
May 1997	Keanu Reeves	
July 1997	Caprice Bourret	
September 1997	Kylie Minogue	
October 1997	Ronan Keating	(with Boyzone featured inside)
November 1997	Gary Barlow	
December 1997	Andrew Lincoln	
March 1998	Clive Owen	
April 1998	Adam Rickitt	
July 1998	Jason Priestley	
August 1998	Kavana (gay)	
September 1998	Spice Girls	
October 1998	Robbie Williams	
December 1998	Marilyn Manson	
January 1999	Kathy Burke	
February 1999	Ryan Phillippe	
March 1999	Philip Olivier	
May 1999	Adam Rickitt	5th Birthday Issue
June 1999	Johan Paulik	
July 1999	Boy George (gay)	
August 1999	Geri Halliwell	
September 1999	Mark Ledsham (gay)	Mr Gay UK 1999
October 1999	Will Mellor	
December 1999	Stephen Gately (gay)	
February 2000	Vinnie Jones	
March 2000	Matt Damon	
April 2000	James Carlton	
May 2000	Jason "J" Brown	Member of the boy band 5ive
June 2000	Fran Healy	From Travis
July 2000	Harry Livingston French	
August 2000	Dermot O'Leary	
September 2000	Kylie Minogue	
October 2000	Max Beesley	
December 2000	Darren Ramsay	
January 2001	Ben Adams	(with A1 featured inside)
February 2001	Adam Rickitt	
March 2001	Will Mellor	
May 2001	Ivan Massow (gay)	
June 2001	Pet Shop Boys (both gay) & cast of Closer to Heaven	
July 2001	Aiden Shaw (gay)	
September 2001	Philip Olivier	
October 2001	Brian Dowling (gay)	
November 2001	Lee Latchford-Evans	
December 2001	Elton John (gay)	
January 2002	David Paisley (gay)	(Youth Issue)
February 2002	Craig Doyle	
April 2002	Tom Stephan	
June 2002	David Beckham	
September 2002	Rupert Everett (gay)	
October 2002	Daniel MacPherson	
November 2002	Justin Timberlake	
December 2002	Kylie Minogue and William Baker	
January 2003	Cristian Solimeno	
March 2003	Jeremy Sheffield (gay)	
April 2003	Ian Somerhalder	
June 2003	Scott Neal	
July 2003	New York Go-Go Boys	
August 2003	The cast of Will & Grace	
September 2003	Nigel Harman	
October 2003	Jarrod Batchelor (gay)	Mr Gay UK 2003
November 2003	Will Young (gay)	
December 2003	Gary Lucy	
January 2004	Michael Stipe (queer)	
February 2004	Marcus Patric	
March 2004	Bruno Langley	
April 2004	Matthew Rush (gay)	
May 2004	George Michael (gay)	
June 2004	Jake Shears (gay)	
July 2004	James Alexandrou	
August 2004	Dieux du Stade	
September 2004	Jordan & Phil Turner	
October 2004	Geri Halliwell	
November 2004	Robbie Williams	
December 2004	Matt Lucas (gay) & David Walliams	
January 2005	Jonathan Rhys Meyers	
February 2005	Charlie Simpson from Busted	Youth Issue
March 2005	Jeremy Sheffield (gay)	
April 2005	Tony Blair	
May 2005	Nick Atkinson	Naked issue
June 2005	Charlotte Church	
July 2005	Johnny Borrell	
August 2005	Lee Ryan (bisexual)	
September 2005	John Barrowman (gay)	
October 2005	Roman Heart	
November 2005	Madonna (bisexual)	
December 2005	Elton John (gay) & husband David Furnish	
January 2006	Heath Ledger	
February 2006	Will Young (gay)	
March 2006	Preston	
April 2006	Freddie Ljungberg	
May 2006	Jamie Dornan	
June 2006	Danny Dyer	
July 2006	Shayne Ward	
August 2006	Scissor Sisters (members Jake Shears, Babydaddy and Del Marquis are gay)	
September 2006	Christina Aguilera	
October 2006	Aiden Shaw (gay)	
November 2006	Take That	
December 2006	cast of the movie Shortbus	
February 2007	McFly	
March 2007	Mitch Hewer & Nicholas Hoult	from Skins (Youth Issue)
April 2007	Mika (gay)	
June 2007	Rufus Wainwright (gay)	
Aug/Sept 2007	Darren Hayes (gay)	
October 2007	Mitch Hewer	'Gays on TV' issue
November 2007	Kylie Minogue	
December 2007	Mark Feehily (gay) & ex-boyfriend Kevin McDaid	
January 2008	Ed Speelers	Youth Issue
February 2008	Chad White (The Hot Issue)	
March 2008	Dan Gillespie Sells (gay)	Lead Singer of band The Feeling
April 2008	Jody Latham	Actor from Shameless
June 2008	Sam Sparro (gay)	
July 2008	Dominic Cooper	
August 2008	Steve Jones	
September 2008	Dan Gillespie Sells, Mark Feehily, Ian McKellen and Alan Carr (all gay)	Youth Issue
October 2008	Will Young (gay)	
November 2008	Girls Aloud	
December 2008	Tom Hardy	
January 2009	Take That	Individual covers of each member
February 2009	James Franco	Interview with Franco about Milk
March 2009	Gethin Jones	
April 2009	Ash Stymest	15th anniversary issue
May 2009	Ben Adams	Naked issue
June 2009	Beth Ditto (lesbian)	Lead singer of The Gossip
July 2009	Sacha Baron Cohen	as his character Brüno
August 2009	Daniel Radcliffe	Harry Potter star
September 2009	Nick Youngquest	Australian Rugby star
October 2009	Ben Cohen	English Rugby star
November 2009	Will Young (gay)	Guest Editor
December 2009	Sean Maguire	
January 2010	Elliott Tittensor	Actor from Shameless
February 2010	Gareth Thomas (gay)	
March 2010	David Cameron	Leader of the Conservative party - double cover
April 2010	John Partridge (gay)	
May 2010	Danny Young	Naked Issue
Summer 2010	Kele Okereke (gay)	Lead singer of the band Bloc Party
June 2010	Jake Shears (gay)	Frontman of the band Scissor Sisters
July 2010	Kylie Minogue	Singer
August 2010	McFly	Pop band
September 2010	Danny Miller	The Issues Issue
October 2010	Jimmy Anderson	England Cricket player
November 2010	Stephen Fry (gay)	The Role Models Issue
December 2010	12 Gay Porn Stars: Junior Stellano, Alex Marte, Zack Elliott, Bailey Morgan, Blu Kennedy, Colton Ford, Erik Rhodes, Hayden Harris, François Sagat, Will Jameson, Eddie Diaz and Arpad Miklos	The Sex Issue
January 2011	Ricky Martin (gay)	200th issue
February 2011	Harry Judd	
March 2011	Kirk Norcross and Mark Wright	Stars of The Only Way Is Essex
April 2011	Kelvin Fletcher	Emmerdale Actor
May 2011	Blue	Naked issue. Boy band representing UK in Eurovision Song Contest 2011
Summer 2011	Steven Davies (gay)	Cricketer
June 2011	Matthew Morrison	
July 2011	Rupert Grint	
August 2011	Ciarán Griffiths	
September 2011	Max George	
October 2011	Greg Remmy	The Sex Issue
November 2011	David Gandy	
December 2011	JLS	
January 2012	Harry Judd	
February 2012	Tom Ellis	
March 2012	Daniel Radcliffe	The Youth Issue
April 2012	Marcus Collins (gay)	The Style Issue
May 2012	LCpl James Wharton and Thom McCaffrey	18th Birthday Edition
Summer 2012	Mark Wright	
June 2012	Gareth Thomas (gay)	The Naked Issue
July 2012	Cheyenne Jackson (gay)	
August 2012	Thom Evans	
September 2012	Nicola Roberts and Henry Holland/Tyson Beckford	The Style Issue (2 covers)
October 2012	Greg Rutherford, Robbie Grabarz, Steve Lewis, Luke Campbell and Pete Reed	Olympic Issue
November 2012	Ian McKellen, George Michael, (both gay) Peter Tatchell, Charlie Condou, Marina and the Diamonds, Harry Judd, Nick Grimshaw (also gay) and Gary Barlow	Attitude Awards issue (8 covers)
December 2012	John Whaite (has a boyfriend)	Christmas issue
January 2013	Jonnie Peacock	Review of 2012 - London Paralympic 2012 gold medal winner
February 2013	Matt Jarvis	
March 2013	Shayne Ward	Naked Issue
April 2013	James Franco	Style Issue
May 2013	David Witts	Actor from EastEnders
Summer 2013	Ben Foden	England Rugby Union international player
June 2013	Union J (members George Shelley, Jaymi Hensley are gay)|	The Youth Issue
July 2013	James Haskell	The Future Issue
August 2013	Sol Heras	Coronation Street actor
September 2013	Tom Cullen	Style Issue
October 2013	McFly	The Music Issue
November 2013	Alan Turing (gay), Ellie Goulding, Cher, Daniel Radcliffe, Ben Cohen, John Grant	Attitude Awards 2013 (Six different covers)
December 2013	Lady Gaga (bisexual)	
January 2014	Ashley Taylor Dawson	The Sex Issue
February 2014	Philip Olivier	Travel Issue
March 2014	Dan Osborne, Kirk Norcross, Greg Rutherford, Sylvain Longchambon	The Naked Issue (four different covers)
April 2014	Robbie Rogers (gay)	The Style Issue
Love and Marriage Special	John Whaite & boyfriend Paul Atkins	Love & Marriage special issue (to commemorate the legalisation of same sex marriage in England and Wales)
May 2014	Harry Judd, Kylie Minogue, Ed Miliband, Jonathan Groff (gay), Danny Dyer and Sam Strike	20 Years of Attitude (five different covers)
Summer 2014	Ben Hardy	
June 2014	Louis Smith	
July 2014	Thom Evans	
August 2014	Tom Daley (gay)	
September 2014	Andrew Scott (gay)	The Style Issue
October 2014	Gareth Thomas and his boyfriend Ian	Film Special
November 2014	Dan Osborne, Tom Daley, Graham Norton, Sharon Stone, Boy George, Waheed Alli, Nicola Adams, Paloma Faith, and Ben Schnetzer	Awards Issue (Nine Different Covers)
December 2014	Olly Murs and Nick Jonas	The Pop Issue
January 2015	Chris Mears, Martin Cremin, Tom Haffield, and Ieuan Lloyd	The Sex Issue
February 2015	The cast of Cucumber	"Collectors Edition"
March 2015	Duncan James	"The Naked issue"
April 2015	RuPaul (gay)	
May 2015	Adam Lambert (gay)	
Summer 2015	Freddie Highmore	
June 2015	Matthew Lewis	
July 2015	Christian Webb, Duncan Craig, Matthew Naz Mahmood-Ogston, Emmanuel Okoghenu, Toni Hogg, Ayla Holdom, George Montague, Moud Goba, Jonny Benjamin, Jonathan Blake, Asifa Lahore	"21st Birthday Special", Launch of Attitude Pride Awards
August 2015	Lance Bass & his husband Michael Turchin, Dino Fetscher, Charlie King, Sanjay Sood-Smith	
September 2015	Ben Thompson	
October 2015	Liam Payne	
November 2015	Keegan Hirst	
December 2015	Zachary Quinto	
January 2016	Olly Alexander	
February 2016	Gleb Savchenko	Travel Special
March 2016	Gus Kenworthy	
April 2016	The Pet Shop Boys	
May 2016	Michael Sam	All American Issue
Summer 2016	Ben Hardy	
June 2016	Laith Ashley and Matthew Lister	Swimwear and Underwear Special (Two Different Covers); Laith Ashley is the Trans man who cover the magazine
July 2016	Prince William	He became the first member of Britain's royal family to appear on the cover of a gay magazine when he appeared on the cover of the July issue of Attitude; in the cover story, he also became the first British royal to openly condemn the bullying of the gay community.
August 2016	Tribute to the 49 victims of Orlando nightclub shooting	
September 2016	Jussie Smollett and Naomi Campbell	The Style Issue
October 2016	Nyle DiMarco	The Queer Theatre Issue
November 2016	Alan Carr, Andreja Pejić, MNEK, Omar Sharif Jr, Pietro Boselli, and Wentworth Miller	Awards Special; Six Different Covers
December 2016	Robbie Williams	
January 2017	Christine and the Queens	Year in review
February 2017	Tom Daley	The Body Issue
March 2017	Gus Kenworthy	Love & Valentine's Special
April 2017	Emma Watson & Dan Stevens	The Style Issue
May 2017	Tyler Oakley, Todrick Hall & Joanne the Scammer	Generation Hope Issue; Three Different Covers
Summer 2017	Adam Peaty & Amini Fonua	
June 2017	Charlie Carver	
July 2017	Declan McKenna	
August 2017	Gavan Hennigan	
December 2017	Jake Shears	
January 2018	Justin Trudeau	
February 2018	Anthony Rapp & Wilson Cruz	
March 2018	Anthony Bowens	
April 2018	Courtney Act & James Corden	The Style Issue; Two Different Covers
May 2018	Ricky Martin & Kylie Minogue	
Summer 2018	Adam Lambert	
June 2018	Troye Sivan & Ian McKellen	
July 2018	The Fab Five	The Fab Five of Netflix's Queer Eye
August 2018	Zander Hodgson & Dominic Cooper	
September 2018	Edward Enninful, Nicola Formichetti & Olivier Rousteing	
October 2018	Rami Malek, Andy Cohen & Cher	
November 2018	Adam Rippon, Jess Glynne, Boy George & George Takei	
December 2018	Sean Hayes & Little Mix	
January 2019	Donatella Versace & Cheyenne Jackson	
February 2019	Bianca Del Rio & Alex Landi	
March 2019	Dsquared2	
April 2019	Matthew Camp	
May 2019	Colton Haynes, Hamed Sinno & Ben Hunte	25th anniversary issue
June 2019	Taron Egerton	
July 2019	Sam Salter & Murray Bartlett	
August 2019	Yvie Oddly	
September 2019	Yungblud & Denek Kania	
October 2019	Gus Kenworthy and Laith Ashley, Renee Zelweger & Ross Mathews	
November 2019	Sam Smith, Ranj Singh, Mika, Joan Collins, Christine and the Queens & Ava Max	
December 2019	Brian J. Smith & Bang Bang Romeo	
January 2020	Lorraine Kelly, Matty Healy, Munroe Bergdorf, Scottee, Tanya Compas, Lewis Oakley, Anick Soni, & Yasmin Benoit	Activists & Allies Issue
February 2020	Graziano Di Prima & Todrick Hall (gay)	
March 2020	Ryan Beatty (gay) & Sami Outalbali	The Body Issue
April 2020	Connor Jessup (gay)	The Style Issue
May 2020	Diplo and Orville Peck (gay), Marcelino Sambé (gay)	
Summer 2020	Gigi Goode	The Pride & Prejudice Issue
June 2020	Alam Wernik	
July 2020	Declan McKenna	
August 2020	Jake Picking & Dexter Mayfield	
September 2020	Jaida Essence Hall & Robert Sheehan	
October 2020	Jim Parsons, Zachary Quinto, Matt Bomer, Andrew Rannells, Charlie Carver, Robin de Jesús (gay)	
November 2020	Nico Tortorella (bisexual)	
December 2020	Dua Lipa	
January 2021	Luke Evans	
February 2021	Pete Buttigieg (gay), Jonathan Bailey (gay), Arlo Parks (bisexual)	
March 2021	Max Harwood (gay)	
April 2021	Gottmik (trans)	Style Issue
May 2021	Russell Tovey (gay)	
Summer 2021	Angel Bismark Curiel; Michael Cimino and George Sear; Pabllo Vittar	Summer Issue; three covers
June 2021	François Sagat	
July 2021	Tom Daley; Matty Lee	
August 2021	Michael Gunning (gay); Alexis Stone	Body Issue; two covers
September 2021	Joshua Bassett (LGBT); Munroe Bergdorf (trans)	Style Issue; two covers
October 2021	Sami Outalbali; Connor Swindells	
November 2021	Bimini Bon Boulash; Billy Porter (gay); Ben Aldridge (gay)	
December 2021	John Whaite and Johannes Radebe (both gay); Andrew Garfield; Rebecca Lucy Taylor (bisexual)	
January 2022	Josh Cavallo	
February 2022	Will Prior	
March/April 2022	Waylon Smithers	
July/August 2022	Queer as Folk cast & Sebastian Vettel	
September/October 2022	Polo Morin	
November/December 2022	Mel C	
January/February 2023	Callum Scott Howells	
March/April 2023	Alice Oseman & Ben Aldridge	
May/June 2023	Matthew Camp	
July/August 2023	Scott Evans	
September/October 2023	Corinna Brown, Kizzy Edgell, Bel Priestley Ash Self, Tobie Donovan, Bradley Riches	Heartstopper cast
November/December 2023	Jake Daniels	
January/February 2024	Dylan Llewellyn, Jon Pointing	Big Boys cast
March/April 2024	Andrew Scott	
May/June 2024	Ncuti Gatwa	
July/August 2024	Joel Kim Booster	
September/October 2024	Omar Apollo	
November/December 2024	Elton John (gay)	
January/February 2025	Lukas Gage	
March/April 2025	Olly Alexander	
May/June 2025	Diego Calva	
July/August 2025	Yungblud	
September/October 2025	Miles Heizer	
November/December 2025	Russell Tovey	
January/February 2026	Mika (singer) and Holly Johnson	
March/April 2026	Zack Polanski	
May/June 2026	Kieron Moore	
July/August 2026		
September/October 2026		
November/December 2026		
