= I Am Norman =

2020 British docu-fiction LGBTQ+ thriller short film

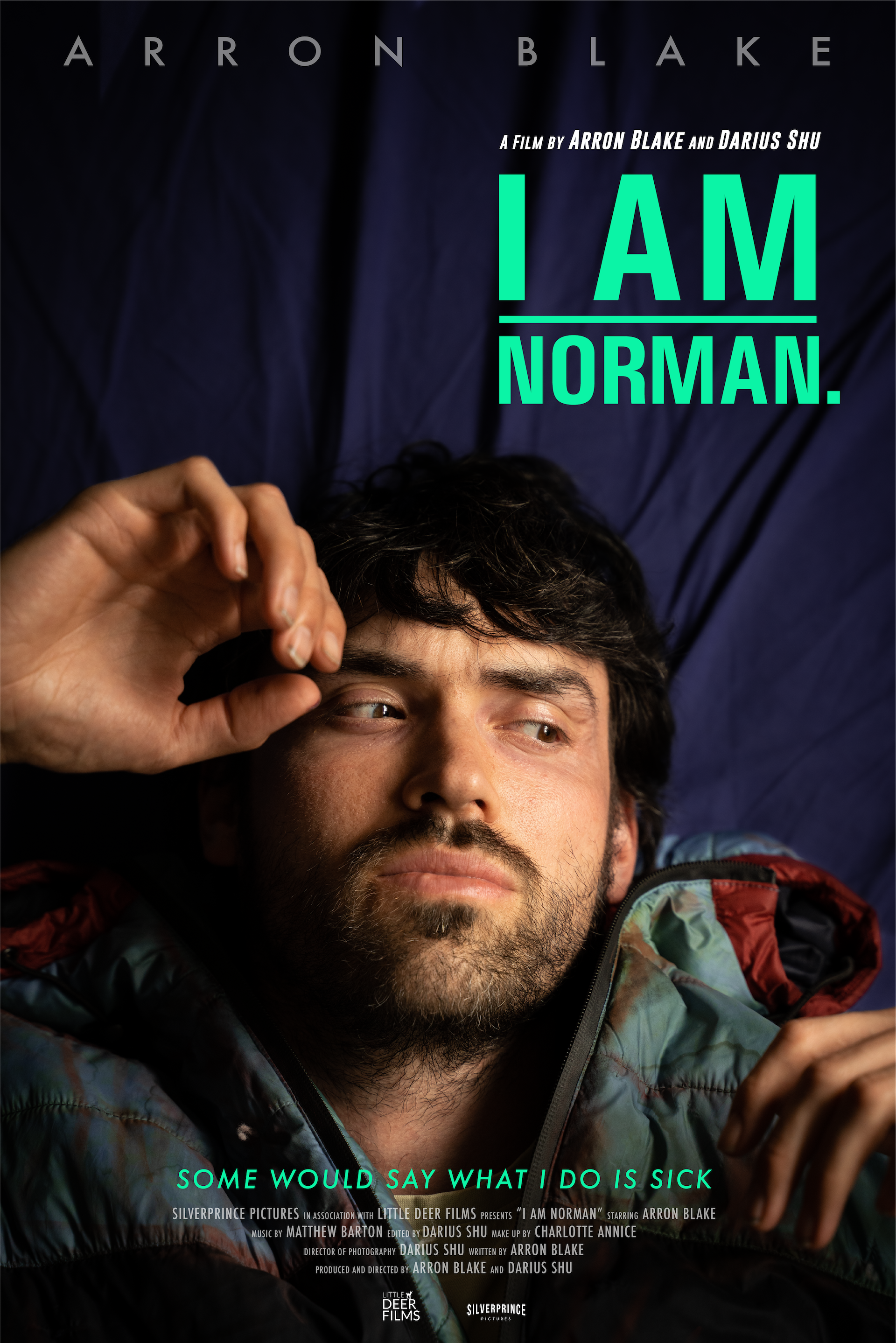
- I Am Norman Official Poster
- Directed by: Arron Blake; Darius Shu
- Written by: Arron Blake
- Produced by: Philip Brisebois; Arron Blake; Darius Shu
- Starring: Arron Blake
- Cinematography: Darius Shu
- Edited by: Darius Shu
- Music by: Matthew Barton
- Production companies: Silverprince Pictures; Little Deer Films
- Release date: November 2020
- Country: United Kingdom
- Language: English

I Am Norman is a 2020 British docu-fiction LGBTQ+ thriller short film directed by Arron Blake and Darius Shu. The film follows a filmmaker documenting a man who lives in a car as he takes him into the woods to share a dark secret. The film aims to raise awareness of the effects of gay conversion therapy and suicide. It is executive produced by Philip Brisebois and produced by Silverprince Pictures in association with Little Deer Films.

== Synopsis ==
A conversion therapy survivor takes a filmmaker into the woods to share a dark secret.

== Cast ==
- Arron Blake as Norman

== Production ==
Filmed in August over three days during the UK's first national COVID-19 lockdown, Blake and Shu wanted to proved themselves of making a visually beautiful provocative film during a pandemic with just a two-man crew, with Shu as cinematographer/co-director and Blake starring as Norman. I Am Norman is another testament to Blake and Shu's ability to sculpt something compelling and unique with a skeleton crew and a meagre budget.

== Style and themes ==
The film is shot in a faux documentary style with Norman chatting to the camera. Blake and Shu wanted to create something different and push the boundaries of visual storytelling with the aim of sending out a powerful social message. It tackles a serious issue within the LGBTQ+ community – in this case, mental health struggles, suicide, family rejection and the damaging effects of gay conversion therapy. Voice Magazine pointed out that the "depictions we have seen of conversion therapy in entertainment are films like Boy Erased and The Miseducation of Cameron Post...these films depict conversion camps in a light which is probably pretty accurate. The rules, the restrictions, the citing of scripture and the inevitable suicide that comes from forcing and shaming a person into thinking their very existence is a sin. Where I Am Norman differs is that it achieves all of this through the story of one man – Norman. The story it tells is more abstract, and the picture it paints is through obscurity."

Viddy Well described the style for I Am Norman as "much more loose in style and structure in comparison to their debut Tribeca film His Hands but no less effective, Blake and Shu take an easy-going and free-spirited approach to the cinematography and direction here. This gives the film a naturalistic and intimate quality that enhances its realism and counterbalances its moments of humorous absurdity. The documentary framing device is extremely effective. It makes everything more playful and conversational, and it successfully creates the illusion that we’re there with the character as they share their dark secrets with us....With its quirky outsider character, dark focus, provocative nature, and humorous and hard-hitting moments, it feels like a Harmony Korine directed, LGBTQ+ version of Man Bites Dog with a twist."

Indy Reviews describe how clever "the motif of the camera in the film draws specific attention to the idea of watching and being watched. In a sense, it appears that we are holding the camera and Norman is talking to the audience directly".

== Music ==
Matthew Barton contributed the original song "A Peaceful Killing" to the film's soundtrack. "A Peaceful Killing" was written by Shu, Barton, and produced by Barton, and mixed and mastered by Sam Wain. Blake and Shu approached the singer-songwriter to contribute an original song to the film.

Chalkpit Records complimented the song as, "A torrent of movielike musicality...'A Peaceful Killing' should soundtrack more than just a movie this winter." Matthew Barton explains that the song "tensions between the ‘beautiful and the brutal".

== Reception ==
=== Critical response ===
The film received generally favourable and positive reviews from film critics. Writing for Film Threat, Norman Gidney gave the film an 8 out of 10 and describe I AM Norman as, "A refined piece of work from two talented filmmakers. It has a voice, a message, and a reason to exist. The subtleties in Blake’s performance, along with the convincing yet artistic work of Shu’s camera, craft a painful portrait of regret and survival."

Alex Clement of HeyUGuys gave the film 5 out of 5 rating complimenting that, "The film is a masterpiece with real power and emotion...executed and beautifully capture with Blake playing Norman with such conviction." HeyUGuys also describe how Blake and Shu created a film that "carries certain essences of the likes of Tarantino, Hitchcock and Kubrick and seems like a fusion of all three."

Olivia Ballington from IndyReviews commended that, "Blake’s portrayal of Norman is truly magnificent and it cuts to the core...combined with Shu’s aesthetically involved cinematography, I AM Norman is an astonishing accomplishment."

Culture Fix gave the film a 5 out of 5 saying how "Blake crafts the character with an inventive level of precision" and how "Blake and Shu direct with a claustrophobic intensity... Norman is always framed somewhat uncomfortably close to the camera."

Saskia Calliste of Voice Magazine highly praised the film as, "silently masterful, and Blake’s portrayal of such a character is one that I won’t be forgetting in a hurry... I AM Norman prove you should never assume a film can’t make an impact without a big budget and a three-hour time slot, it disturbs the devil you know and recontextualies the one you may have heard of but not considered as a pressing societal threat." Voice Magazine also called the film, "a uniquely disturbing take on the repercussions of conversion therapy."

Indie Shorts Mag gave the film a 5 out of 5 and described the film as "Hauntingly beautiful". I AM Norman also entered Indie Shorts Mag's Hall of Fame. A recognition awarded to short film's that have scored the 5 out of 5 ratings on their website.
