= Anick Soni =

British intersex activist (born 1995)

Anick Soni FRSA
- Born: April 3, 1995 (age 31); Leicester, England
- Occupations: Writer, Creative Consultant and Researcher
- Known for: children's rights activist
- Website: interconnecteduk.org

Anick Soni (born 1995) is a British Asian intersex human rights activist, creative consultant and researcher in childhood and children's rights, and Fellow of the Royal Society of Arts. In 2020, he co-founded an intersex charity in the UK named InterconnectedUK (iCONUK).

== Early life ==
Soni was born with uncommon sex characteristics including hypospadias and partial androgen insensitivity syndrome. Growing up, Soni was subjected to failed surgery at age 4 months, followed by multiple procedures over 17 years to try to improve the outcome and enlarge the size of his penis. In a 2017 interview with Patrick Strudwick for BuzzFeed, he recalls repeated medical examinations, living in fear of discovery at school, an adolescent desire to be 'normal', never having met another intersex person, and a lack of counselling support for him or his parents, leading to an attempted suicide. Despite experiencing a lack of disclosure during his childhood, Soni later chose to undergo a phalloplasty. He learned the word intersex at age 21, initially misunderstanding the term, when he obtained access to his medical records.

Soni graduated with an honours degree in law from the University of Westminster in 2017, which included a year of study on Humanities in Sydney, Australia. He briefly studied Sociology of Childhood and Children's Rights at University College London. He participated in his first event by and for intersex people in February 2018, at an OII Europe conference in Copenhagen. This experience was filmed for the BBC. Since 2024, Soni has worked at UCL's School for Creative and Cultural Industries.

== Media ==
Anick Soni was a radio DJ from the ages of 9–18, hosting a weekly show on Takeover Radio 103.2FM in Leicester. He has been the subject of a BBC TV and radio documentary, named The Intersex Diaries. He has regularly appeared on BBC Radio - being invited to speak by Jeremy Vine and Evan Davis on issues involving intersex and mental health. In January 2020, Soni became the first intersex person on the cover of Attitude magazine. In June 2021, he finished filming for an upcoming Channel 4 documentary which he spoke about during TedxLondon's Big Queer Conversation. Soni played the role of Ved in the short-film Queer Parivaar - a short film by Shiva Raichandani. On Intersex Awareness Day 2021, Soni took part in 'Building Queertopia', a BBC Sounds podcast hosted by Chelsee Grimes and Shane Jenek (Courtney Act). Soni worked with Channel 4 to create a documentary exploring phalloplasty in May 2022, his story featured alongside two other men who have had the procedure. Titled “The Man with the Penis on his Arm”, referring to one of the other two men, the film also features Anick's intersex life and explores his feelings about the surgery. For Intersex Awareness Day 2023, Anick wrote about his experiences of dating for Gay Times.

== Activism ==
During the 2012 Summer Olympics torch relay, Soni carried the Olympic Torch - being nominated by his youth worker Bez and selected by Sir Peter Soulsby, Mayor of Leicester, in recognition for his dedication to improving the lives of children and young people. It was covered as part of ITV News - which followed his journey.

Soni has been involved with intersex activism publicly since 2017, first disclosing his story to BuzzFeed. Soni campaigns for protections from discrimination and forced surgeries, and for better support for children and caregivers, visibility and community healing. He describes himself as favouring personal consent and bodily autonomy, and not anti-surgery. He has written the first briefing paper on intersex for the UK Parliament and speaks nationally and internationally. A detailed account of his story was featured in a BBC News article in 2018.

He helped organize a first intersex march in London in 2018, with fellow activists and allies. Anick was a core team volunteer for UK Black Pride, from 2018 helping in a variety of roles over the years. Whilst acknowledging that intersex is not necessarily an 'LGBT+' issue, as a bisexual, he feels comfortable speaking about this intersectionality. He spoke about 'coming out' as intersex for Hunger Magazine and Cosmopolitan. Soni has studied SOGIESC (Sexual Orientation, Gender Identity and Expression, and Sex Characteristics) extensively, and has provided insight into the topic using his intersectional lens.

In 2020 he became a co-founder and trustee of new intersex-led charity InterconnectedUK (iConUK). The charity provides information and guidance for those who are born with variations of sex development/characteristics, differences in sex development and intersex traits.

Soni joined the advisory board for the Privilege Project, where he represents work across media/broadcasting and higher education. In May 2021, he was included in Queer Power! A Celebration of Icons, Activists and Game Changers from Across the Rainbow by illustrator Dom&Ink, published by HarperCollins. He was recognised for his intersex activism and being a Queer Person of Colour within the LGBT+ community - it mentions his involvement in planning events like UK Black Pride and outreach and educational work. Anick is also named as part of the information about 'intersex' in Chloe Davis' The Queen's English.

During June 2021, Soni was part of TedxLondon's Big Queer Conversation. He spoke about the importance of volunteering and his plans to write and create content for children - in March 2022, he received funding from Arts Council England to begin researching his book. Anick has been working with Queer Leadership collective WeCreateSpace to deliver and facilitate learning for people on a wide variety of issues linked to LGBTQIA+ lives. Anick is on the advisory board for Kalda (LGBTQIA+ Mental Health App) In 2022, Anick contributed to Milly Evan's book 'HONEST: Everything They Don't Teach You About Sex and Relationships'. Anick joined the board for The Privilege Project in 2022 which aims to change the conversation around people's privilege and lived experience.

Anick was involved in the GREAT Campaign for the UK Government in 2023. In the global campaign, he speaks about his experience of finding his voice, the power of storytelling, and the diversity of LGBTQIA+ communities in the UK. He shares his affinity with Golden Boy, a book by British Author, Abigail Tarttelin. During Pride Month 2023, Benefit Cosmetics included Anick and Yasmin Benoit as part of their RainBrows Campaign, making Anick and Yasmin the first intersex, and asexual people to be in their global campaigns respectively.

== Selected bibliography ==
- Soni, Anick (May 10, 2024) "Gemma Collins was told to abort her intersex baby, but we deserve to live too" METRO. Retrieved 14 May 2024.
- Soni, Anick (October 26, 2023) "Dating as an intersex person" GAY TIMES. Retrieved October 26, 2023.
- Soni, Anick (April 2, 2022) "Make Queer Films For Us, Not About Us.". QueerAF. Retrieved 4 April 2022.
- Soni, Anick (February 25, 2022). "Who Am I?". We Create Space. Retrieved 4 April 2022.
- Soni, Anick (January 31, 2022). "Dani Coyle's New Podcase Celebrates Intersex Joy". Dazed. Retrieved 25 March 2022.
- Soni, Anick (November 16, 2021). "Building Queertopia". BBC Sounds. Retrieved November 16, 2021.
- Soni, Anick (25 June 2019). "The realities and complexities of being a Black intersex woman". Cosmopolitan.
- Soni, Anick (1 May 2019). "Telling Caster Semenya her body is not normal damns the future of sport". Metro.
- Soni, Anick (30 September 2018). "Why I Made A Film About Being Intersex". AZ Magazine.
- Soni, Anick (July 13, 2018). "What Does It Mean To Be Intersex - Queerstory". MTV UK. Retrieved July 10, 2021.

== Recognition ==
Soni is a Fellow of the Royal Society of Arts. In 2019 he was awarded the Gay Times 'British Community Trailblazer' award in recognition for his work on intersex activism within the LGBT+ community. In 2021, he was recognised as part of the Matter of Culture Honours. In 2012, he was selected as a torch-bearer for the Summer Olympics torch relay. In March 2022, Soni was awarded funding as part of Develop Your Creative Practice by Arts Council England to begin work on his debut collection of short stories for children. Anick was named in Gay Times in a timeline of individuals and organisations who have positively impacted LGBTQ+ life in Britain since the first Pride march in 1972.
