= Secret Child =

2018 film short by Yewweng Ho

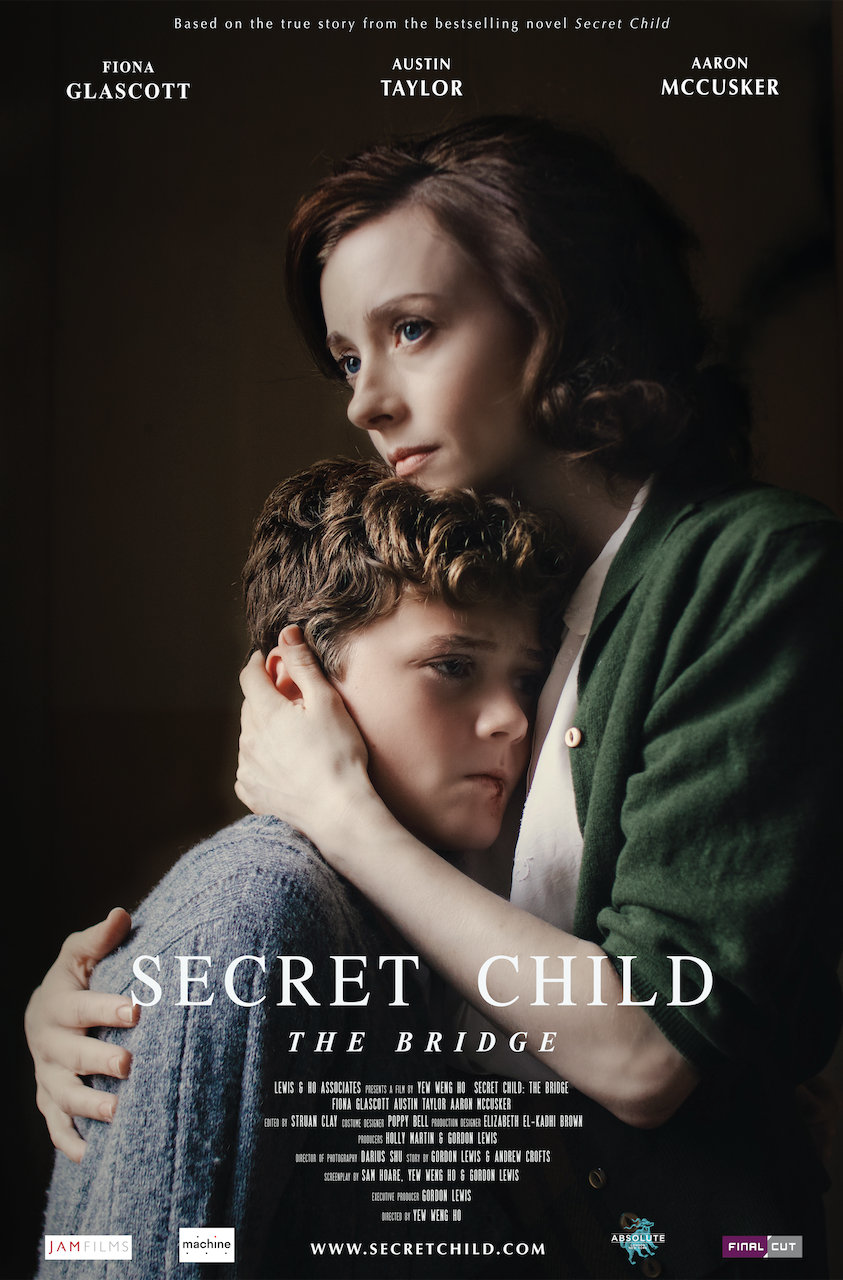
- Directed by: Yewweng Ho
- Screenplay by: Sam Hoare
- Based on: Secret Child by Gordon Lewis
- Produced by: Gordon Lewis; Holly Martin
- Starring: Fiona Glascott; Austin Taylor; Aaron McCusker
- Cinematography: Darius Shu
- Edited by: Struan Clay
- Production companies: Lewis and Ho Productions
- Release dates: 13 August 2018 (U.S.); 24 August 2018 (UK)
- Running time: 17 minutes
- Country: United Kingdom
- Language: English

Secret Child is a 2018 British biographical drama short film directed by Yewweng Ho and is his directing debut. The screenplay, written by Sam Hoare, is based on the memoirs from the book Secret Child by Gordon Lewis. The film stars Fiona Glascott, Austin Taylor and Aaron McCusker, and tells the story of a single mother and her eight-year-old son meeting her man from her past after nine years.

Secret Child had its world premiere at the Hollyshorts Film Festival in 2018 and was nominated for Best Period Piece, and its London premiere at New Renaissance Film Festival, in which it won Best Debut Film. The film has received over 20 international awards and nominations with generally positive reviews, who praised the performances of Glascott, Taylor and McCusker, Ho's direction and Darius Shu's cinematography of the film.

== Plot ==
At the age of eight, Gordon (played by Austin Taylor) is introduced to a much older man called Bill (played by Aaron McCusker) by his mother, Cathleen (played by Fiona Glascott).

== Cast ==
- Fiona Glascott as Cathleen
- Austin Taylor as Gordon
- Aaron McCusker as Bill

== Production ==
In 2017, producer Gordon Lewis and director Yewweng Ho teamed up with cinematographer Darius Shu to begin principal photography of the film. Fiona Glascott (Brooklyn, Fantastic Beasts: The Crimes of Grindelwald), Aaron McCusker (Bohemian Rhapsody, Shameless) and Austin Taylor (My Cousin Rachel, Doctor Who) were cast in the main roles for the film.

Lewis is in talks to develop Secret Child into a full-length feature or a television series with his second book Secret to Sultan coming soon.

== Release ==
Secret Child had its world premiere at the Hollyshorts Film Festival at the Chinese Theatre in Los Angeles on August 13, 2018. The film had its London premiere at Close Up Cinema at the New Renaissance Film Festival on August 24, 2018.

== Reception ==
=== Critical response ===
Anna Mayers from Close Up Culture praised the film as '...beautiful" and that it was '...brought to life in a sweet yet truthful way'.

== Awards and nominations ==
Year	Festival	Category	Result
2018	Hollyshorts Film Festival	Best Period Piece	Nominated
2018	Oniros Film Awards	Best Cinematography	Nominated
2018	Oniros Film Awards	Best Short Film	Won
2018	Alternative Film Festival	Best Period Piece	Nominated
2018	European Cinematography Awards	Best Short Film	Won
2018	London International Motion Pictures Award	Best Narrative / Fiction UK Short Film	Nominated
2018	Bucharest ShortCut Cinefest	Best Cinematography	Won
2018	Bucharest ShortCut Cinefest	Best Actress	Won
2018	Bucharest ShortCut Cinefest	Best Director	Won
2018	Bucharest ShortCut Cinefest	Best Editor	Won
2018	Bucharest ShortCut Cinefest	Best Film	Nominated
2018	Bucharest ShortCut Cinefest	Best Original Score	Nominated
2018	Festigious International Film Festival	Best Narrative Short	Won
2018	Festigious International Film Festival	Best Cinematography	Won
2018	Festigious International Film Festival	Best Director	Won
2018	Festigious International Film Festival	Best Supporting Actor	Won
2018	Festigious International Film Festival	Honorable Mention for Actor	Won
2018	Festigious International Film Festival	Best Original Score	Won
2018	Festigious International Film Festival	Best Picture	Nominated
2018	Gold Movie Awards	Best Short	Won
2018	Kerry Film Festival	Best Short Film	Nominated
2018	Largo Film Awards	Best Cinematography	Nominated
2018	Largo Film Awards	Best Director	Nominated
2018	Los Angeles Independent Film Festival Awards	Best Drama Short	Won
2018	Los Angeles Independent Film Festival Awards	Best Director	Won
2018	Los Angeles Independent Film Festival Awards	Best Cinematography	Nominated
2018	New Renaissance Film Festival	Best Debut Film	Won
2018	Oniros Film Awards	Best Short Film	Won
2018	Oniros Film Awards	Best Cinematography	Nominated
2018	Open World Toronto Film Festival	Best Director	Nominated
2018	Overcome Film Festival	Best Actress	Won
2018	Sydney Indie Film Festival	Best Short Film	Nominated
2018	The Lift-Off Sessions	Best Short Film	Nominated
2019	Los Angeles Cinefest	Best Short Film	Nominated
2019	Queen Palm International Film Festival	Best Cinematography	Nominated
