= Molly (2026 film) =

British film by Darius Shu

- Theatrical release poster
- Directed by: Darius Shu
- Written by: Darius Shu
- Produced by: Kaushik Ray; Pooja Chauhan; Darius Shu
- Starring: Hiroki Berrecloth; Frank Kauer; Aldous Ciokajlo-Squire; Kadell Herida; Xander Pang; Tatum Swithenbank; Kaja Chan
- Cinematography: Darius Shu
- Edited by: Darius Shu
- Music by: Benjamin Doherty
- Production companies: Taran Tantra Telefilms; Silverprince Pictures
- Release date: 27 March 2026 (Roze Filmdagen)
- Running time: 23 minutes
- Country: United Kingdom
- Language: English

Molly is a 2026 British romantic drama film written and directed by Darius Shu. The film stars Hiroki Berrecloth as Vinnie and Frank Kauer as Ryan, following two men who meet in a launderette and develop a meaningful connection as they navigate emotional complexities and expectations of love in their relationship. Aldous Ciokajlo-Squire and Kaja Chan appear in supporting roles.

The film world premiered at Roze Filmdagen in Amsterdam and had its UK Premiere at British Urban Film Festival 2026 in London. The film became a Best British Film winner at the 20th Iris Prize LGBTQ+ Film Festival and is now streaming on Channel 4.

== Plot ==
A chance encounter at a launderette sparks a meaningful connection between Vinnie and Ryan. As closeness blurs into desire, their relationship forces them to confront what love demands before it fractures everything they have built.

== Cast ==
- Hiroki Berrecloth as Vinnie
- Frank Kauer as Ryan
- Aldous Ciokajlo-Squire as Connor
- Kadell Herida as Nate
- Xander Pang as Dan
- Tatum Swithenbank as Alexis
- Kaja Chan as Leah

== Production ==
Shu began developing Molly in 2021, originally under the title Goldfish. The project went through several iterations, including an 80-page feature-length screenplay, which Shu abandoned after concluding that extensive feedback had begun to dilute his original approach to the story. He subsequently re-wrote a whole new script in 2024 and returned to a more contained and intimate premise that is Molly. The film developed over four years, from its initial conception in 2021 through production in 2025 and its release in 2026.

Fundraising began in 2022, alongside an open casting call for the film in the United Kingdom. It was announced that Hiroki Berrecloth was cast as the lead role in 2023. His co-lead Frank Kauer joined the film in early 2025.

On 22 January 2024, Taran Tantra Telefilms and executive producer Kaushik Ray joined in for the financing alongside producer Pooja Chauhan.

Principal photography began on 20 March 2025.

== Release ==
=== Theatrical ===
Molly had its world premiere in competition at Roze Filmdagen on 25 March 2026. The film had its UK Premiere at British Urban Film Festival, and Queer East Festival in May 2026 in London. The film had its North West Premiere at Sunderland Shorts Film Festival 2026 and won the Honourable Mention award.

Molly had its Asian premiere at KASHISH Pride Film Festival 2026 and screened in competition for Best International Narrative in June 2026. In August 2026, Molly had its first public theatrical screening through a partnership with ActOne Cinema. The film continued its journey to have its US Premiere at OutSouth Film Festival 2026 and its Hong Kong premiere at the Hong Kong Lesbian & Gay Film Festival 2026 in September 2026. Molly became a nominee at the British Society of Cinematographers (BSC) Cinematography in Short Film award.

The film will screened for two nights at Cineworld Cardiff as part of the Best British Day at Iris Prize in October 2026.

Molly became a winner of the Best British Film category at Iris Prize 2026.

=== Home media ===
In August 2026, it was announced with the nomination of Best British Film at Iris Prize, an acquired distribution deal was made with Channel 4 to stream Molly in United Kingdom for a year from November 2026. The film is now made available to watch on Channel 4.

== Reception ==
=== Critical response ===
The critic Roger Walker-Dack from Queer Guru gave it a score of 5/5 and praised "Shu's Molly is such an excellent example of how much passion and professionalism are poured into short films like this, and so raises the bar for queer cinema as much, if not more, than the same as some full-length feature films." Alastair James from Flicker Magazine described Molly as "...one of the more significant pieces of queer filmmaking to come out of Britain this year" and "is a heartfelt look at love through a new lens that succeeds in charming with sweet performances and a simple but emotional message." Jason Knight from UK Film Review calls the film "A dramatic and beautiful viewing". The film impressed critics for Shu's script and direction, whose cinematic technique through its cinematography, as well as narrative structure, was praised for its ability to deal with the theme. Critics also praised the performances of the actors in the cast. Russell T Davies praised that "Berrecloth and Kauer shines on screen" and Mark Gatiss calls it "Tender, delicate and ravishingly shot".

In the Asian press, Magdalena Nieświec from Asian Movie Pulse reviewed the film as "deeply poetic and well crafted film" and praised the cinematography that "Shu, who also serves as the cinematographer, pays meticulous attention to both framing and visuals. Kept within a warm palette dominated by browns, creams, blues, and occasional purples, the film sustains a calming sense of intimacy between its characters" while Katie Smith-Wong from Flick Feast praised "Shu's intimate direction and camerawork encapsulating the growing closeness between the characters."

Rebecca Cherry from Film Carnage gave it a score of 4/5 and writing that " Molly is touching, pensive and sweet. It has all of the elements of a classic romcom but goes further than that into an interesting discussion of what a relationship is, being comfortable and adjusting to your partner's needs, or whether that's a possibility. That's achieved in a natural way, without having to rush into the topic or deal with it overtly, Darius Shu leaves a lot of room for viewers to interpret things themselves."

Neil Baker from Cineorama gave it a score of 4/5 and calls the film "Enchanting, effervescent and eloquent, as Darius Shu's Molly comes to a close, Vinnie and Ryan's journey is only just beginning, and one can't help but hope that one day we might return to see their love continue to blossom in a vast ocean of possibilities."

=== Accolades ===
Award	Category	Recipient(s)	Result
Big Fridge International Film Festival	Best LGBTQIA+ Film	Darius Shu	Won
Sunderland Shorts Film Festival	Honourable Mention	Darius Shu	Won
Kashish Pride Film Festival	Best International Narrative	Darius Shu	Nominated
Kashish Pride Film Festival	Best Screenplay	Darius Shu	Nominated
Kashish Pride Film Festival	Best Performance in a Lead Role	Hiroki Berrecloth	Nominated
Iris Prize LGBTQIA+ Film Festival	Best British Film	Darius Shu	Winner
British Society of Cinematographers	Cinematography in a Short Film	Darius Shu	Nominated
