= Ayla Holdom =

British military aviator

- Military career
- Allegiance: United Kingdom
- Branch: Royal Air Force
- Rank: Flight lieutenant (former)

Ayla Holdom is a British helicopter pilot and former flight lieutenant in the Royal Air Force. Holdom served in the Royal Air Force for 13 years, including service in the RAF Search and Rescue Force alongside Prince William. In 2010, she became the first pilot in the armed forces to openly identify as transgender. In 2023, she was elected vice chairwoman of the board of trustees of the LGBTQ+ charity Stonewall and then was chairwoman of the charity until 2026.

== Military and civil service ==
Holdom served for 13 years in the Royal Air Force and is a former flight lieutenant; she was part of the RAF Search and Rescue Force, serving at RM Chivenor alongside William, Prince of Wales. With her coming out as a transgender woman in 2010, she became the first pilot in the British Armed Forces to openly identify as transgender. Her employer was supportive of her gender identity.

As of 2018, Holdom was employed as a helicopter pilot in the National Police Air Service.

== Public profile ==
Early into her gender transition, in 2010, Holdom was outed as a transgender woman by the Sun tabloid due to her association with Prince William. Paris Lees, in Attitude magazine, writes that the Sun had used "a particularly crude metaphor" in reference to Holdom's gender identity but that Holdom used the publicity afforded by the experience to elevate "trans issues and visibility." She was notified of the story's appearance on the Sun's front page only one day in advance, and later recalled that she "felt attacked and vilified by people I'd never met and betrayed by whoever went to the press." The following year she and her wife were invited to Prince William's wedding.

In 2015, Holdom was featured on the Pride Power List and profiled in Attitude magazine. A 2018 production by the Sydney Theatre Company, Still Point Turning, is a dramatisation of the lives of Holdom and Royal Australian Air Force group captain Cate McGregor, who is also a transgender woman. In 2023, she was elected vice chairwoman of the board of trustees of the LGBTQ+ charity Stonewall. She was then chairwoman of the charity until 2026, when she was succeeded by former Scottish Labour leader Kezia Dugdale.

== Personal life ==
Holdom is lesbian, and was in a relationship with her wife, Wren, for eight years before they married in a civil ceremony around 2008. At the time of marriage, Holdom had been presenting as a woman outside of the workplace.
