= Cate McGregor =

Writer and former Australian Defence Force officer

Cate McGregor AM
- Born: 24 May 1956 (age 70); Toowoomba, Queensland, Australia
- Education: BA (Hons) MA
- Occupations: Commentator, legal student, activist
- Known for: Writing, military service, gender transition

Catherine Elizabeth McGregor is a prominent Australian writer, sports commentator and former Australian Defence Force officer.

She has worked as an Australian Army Officer, as a cricket commentator and writer, and as a speechwriter to former New South Wales Labor Premier Bob Carr, former Federal Labor Party leader Kim Beazley and to the 1993 Liberal Party election campaign.

== Gender transition ==
McGregor stated that she was diagnosed as transgender in 1985, following a prolonged period of alcohol and drug abuse, but it was not until 2012 that she, in her own words, "repudiated... [her] birth sex". While McGregor's father died, aged 42, in 1964 from a brain tumour, her mother survived him until 1992 and McGregor considered that transition would have "appalled" them and therefore chose not to transition until just after her 56th birthday. Following a crisis in November 2011 McGregor felt she had to commit to this path of transformation if she wanted to survive. Even after transition, McGregor stated her brother (now deceased) refused to recognise her as female, and that her pre-transition 2001 marriage to her wife ultimately broke down (they divorced in 2016) as a result of her decision to transition.

McGregor completed gender reassignment surgery in her early 60s and takes oestrogen. She has stated she is not attracted to men.

== Military ==
McGregor joined the Australian Army as an Officer Cadet at the Royal Military College Duntroon on 14 January 1974, where she spent the next four years, before graduating with a Bachelor of Arts (Honours) at the end of 1977. McGregor went on to serve in a number of junior command appointments in the 8th/9th Battalion, Royal Australian Regiment at Enoggera Barracks in Brisbane, and in an Instructor appointment at the Army's Jungle Training Centre in Canungra.

In the early 1980s, not long after being promoted to captain, McGregor resigned from the Army (later working for law firms McClellands and Sparke Helmore as an articled clerk, and for the Labor Party and Liberals as a speechwriter), before deciding to return to the Australian Army in 2001 after wanting to seek an operational deployment to East Timor (Timor-Leste).

After re-joining the Army, and having deployed to East Timor, McGregor went on to serve in a number of staff appointments at Army Headquarters, including acting as speechwriter to the Chief of Army between 2001 and 2014. It was in this role that she worked for Lieutenant General David Morrison who served as Chief of Army between June 2011 and May 2015. McGregor wrote the script for the famous 12 June 2013 call-out message on YouTube in which Morrison told Army personnel that if they weren't willing to respect, and work with, women in the Army they should "get out". This message was prompted by repeated high-profile incidents of unacceptable behaviour towards women by serving Army members. On Australia Day 2012, McGregor, then Lieutenant Colonel, was appointed a Member of the Order of Australia in the Military Division for "exceptional service to the Australian Army as the Director of the Land Warfare Studies Centre".

When McGregor advised David Morrison of her intent to transition and offered her resignation, Morrison "refused to accept her resignation". McGregor went public with her transition in November 2013 and as a result became the highest ranking transgender person in the Australian Defence Force at that time.

Following her public revelation in 2013, there followed a number of acrimonious social media exchanges about McGregor, in which McGregor took an active part, that led to her being formally counselled by the Australian Defence Force for conduct that reflected poorly on her judgment and for which the Department of Defence made a payment in compensation to a complainant. McGregor subsequently decided to leave the Army, transferring to the Royal Australian Air Force (RAAF) Reserve on 20 June 2014 as a Group Captain, to work on projects for the Chief of Air Force. McGregor is no longer employed by the Air Force.

== Military honours and awards ==

Member of the Order of Australia (AM)	26 January 2012
Australian Service Medal	
Defence Long Service Medal	(25–29 years of service)
Australian Defence Medal	

== Cricket ==
From 2011 McGregor has been a cricket writer for The Spectator, a cricket commentator for The Australian, and the Australian Financial Review, and the author of a book, An Indian Summer of Cricket, published on 24 November 2012. In a 2012 review, Tony Abbott, then federal Leader of the Opposition, described the book as "the best sort of book about sport" for "those who think that sport can be a metaphor for life". Abbott called the Chief of Army's launch of the book "a fitting salute to [moral] courage"

In late 2016, McGregor resumed her cricket career playing for a Canberra women's cricket team, and stated she wished to play in the Women's Big Bash League. It is reported that she uses hormone therapy, has high levels of oestrogen and no longer produces testosterone.

In December 2018, McGregor was dumped as an ABC cricket commentator, something which she described as having "unravelled" her life.

== Queenslander of the Year ==
In 2015, McGregor was named as Queenslander of the Year, despite not living in Queensland, and as such became a finalist for 2016 Australian of the Year, which was subsequently awarded to her previous commanding officer, David Morrison. She described the selection of Morrison as a "weak, conventional choice", a comment for which she subsequently apologised.

In December 2016 McGregor was removed from the Australian of the Year honour roll at her request. She has stated that the awards are a "farce" and that she regrets having accepted one. McGregor has also argued that the awards are being used by activists.

== Post-military career ==
McGregor was a regular commentator on Sky News and in The Australian.

McGregor was for a time, patron of Kaleidoscope Australia, a not-for-profit organisation focused on promoting and protecting the rights of LGBTI people in the Asia Pacific region. In September 2016, however, McGregor was dropped as patron by Kaleidoscope Australia because of her criticism of the Safe Schools program. In May 2018, McGregor declared she had been wrong to oppose the Safe Schools program. "It's an excellent program, and it saves lives... I should have been a supporter from the start... I regret that I wasn't... Young trans people need an ally... I could have helped, and I didn't, and I regret that".

A 2018 production by the Sydney Theatre Company, Still Point Turning, is a dramatisation of the lives of McGregor and Royal Air Force helicopter pilot Ayla Holdom, who is also a transgender woman.

== See also ==
- Transgender people in sports
- Women's National Cricket League
