= Aaron McCusker =

Irish actor

- Born: Portadown, County Armagh, Northern Ireland
- Occupation: Actor
- Years active: 1997–present
- Spouse: Jennie Sutton (m. 2009)

Aaron McCusker is a Northern Ireland actor. He is best known for his portrayal of Jamie Maguire in Channel 4's television series Shameless and Freddie Mercury's boyfriend Jim Hutton in the 2018 feature film Bohemian Rhapsody.

== Early life ==
McCusker was born in Portadown, County Armagh. He was a member of the local drama group called The Phoenix Players.

== Career ==
From 2007 to 2013, McCusker starred as Jamie Maguire in 108 episodes of Shameless. He appeared in Ultimate Force, The Bill and a TV adaptation of Jonathan Coe's novel The Rotters' Club.

McCusker starred in the video for the song "Making Money" by Microlip. He played serial killer AJ Yates in season eight of Dexter. He portrayed astronaut Wally Schirra in the ABC series The Astronaut Wives Club. He played Jason Donnelly in the psychological thriller Fortitude. On 18 April 2016, he appeared as Wesley, an MI6 agent, on the American police drama Castle (episode: "Backstabber"). McCusker played Freddie Mercury's boyfriend Jim Hutton in the biopic Bohemian Rhapsody (2018).

In 2020, McCusker starred as Finn Maguire in the third series of British Nordic noir detective series Marcella.

== Personal life ==
In April 2009 McCusker married his long-term girlfriend, Jennie Sutton, at Beamish Hall, a country house hotel.

McCusker lives in Hale, Trafford.

During a 2008 interview with Sky Sports, alongside fellow Shameless actor Ciarán Griffiths, McCusker spoke of being a supporter of both Liverpool and Celtic. He is good friends with ex footballer Michael O'Neill who also lives and went to the same school in McCusker's home town of Portadown.

== Filmography ==
=== Film ===
Year	Title	Role	Notes
2003	The Ticking Man	Jack	
2014	Shooting for Socrates	Gerry Armstrong	
2014	Loss	Mark	Short film
2018	Incoming	Bridges	Completed
2018	Final Score	SAS Leader	
2018	Bohemian Rhapsody	Jim Hutton	
2018	Secret Child	Bill	Short film; completed
2019	Backdraft 2	Touhy	
2020	Caroline		Short film
2021	Nightride	Ringo	
2022	Prancer: A Christmas Tale	Gerald	
2025	Whitetail (film)	Oscar	
2026	Chasing Millions	George	

=== Television ===
Year	Title	Role	Notes
2002	Murder	D.S. T J Holland	TV movie
2002	Ultimate Force	Matt Shaunessy	Episode: "The Killing of a One-Eyed Bookie"
2005	The Rotters' Club	Liam Morrissey	Episode: "The Maws of Doom"
2006	The Bill	Thomas Dunane	Episode: "399: A Bad Call - Part 2"
2007–2013	Shameless	Jamie Maguire	108 episodes
2009	Demons	Mark	Episode: "The Whole Enchilada"
2013	Dexter	A.J. Yates	2 episodes
2014	Silent Witness	DS Adam Kemp	Episode: "Coup de Grace" (2 parts)
2014	24: Live Another Day	DOD Tech	Episodes: "7:00 p.m.-8:00 p.m."
2015	Fortitude	Jason Donnelly	8 episodes
2015	The Astronaut Wives Club	Wally Schirra	10 episodes
2016	Castle	Wesley Connors	Episode: "Backstabber"
2018	Women on the Verge	Martin	6 episodes
2019	Ransom	Leo Turner	Episode: "Unfit"
2020	Marcella	Finn Maguire	8 episodes
2021–2025	Hope Street	Clint Dunwoody	47 episodes
2025–2026	Coronation Street	Ben Driscoll	Regular role; 128 episodes

== Theatre credits ==
Year	Title	Role	Venue	Notes
1997	The Voyage of the Dawn Treader	Prince Caspian	The Lyric, Belfast	
2001	Marching On	Ricky	Scotland tour	with 7:84
2004	Blind Sight	Narrator	Tramway Glasgow & Contact Theatre, Manchester	
2005	King Lear	Carpenter/Ensemble	Crucible Theatre, Sheffield	
2005	The Cure at Troy	Neoptolemus	Cockpit Theatre, London	
2006	Blackwater Angel	Martin Riley	Finborough Theatre, London	
2012	The Importance of Being Earnest	Algernon Moncrieff	The Lyric, Belfast	
2018	Good Vibrations	Terri Hooley	The Lyric, Belfast	
