= Benefit Cosmetics =

American cosmetics company

Benefit Cosmetics LLC
- Company type: Subsidiary
- Industry: Cosmetics
- Founded: 1976; 50 years ago
- Founder: Jean and Jane Ford
- Headquarters: San Francisco, California, United States
- Area served: Worldwide
- Parent: LVMH
- Website: benefitcosmetics.com

Benefit Cosmetics LLC is a manufacturer of cosmetics founded and headquartered in San Francisco, California. It is a subsidiary of LVMH Moët Hennessy Louis Vuitton.

== History ==
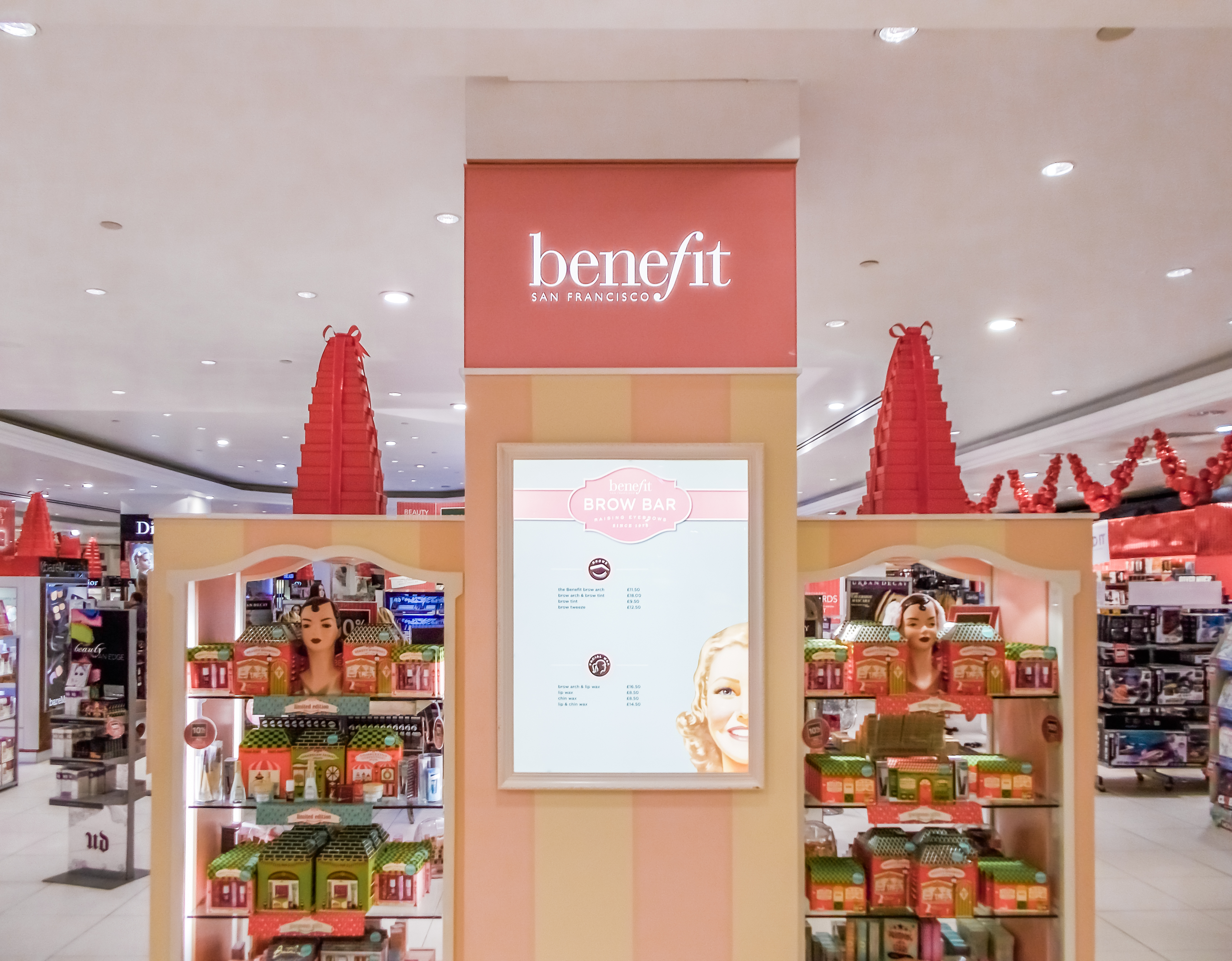
Benefit stand in Debenhams department store in Sutton, London

Benefit was founded by the twin sisters Jean and Jane Ford. Born in Indiana, they attended Indiana University before moving to San Francisco. In 1976, the twins opened a beauty boutique named "The Face Place" in San Francisco's Mission District. The Face Place later moved to Kearny Street in downtown San Francisco in the 1980s.

In 1989, the Face Place product catalog was developed. The Fords then focused on department store distribution and renamed the company Benefit Cosmetics in 1990. In 1991, Benefit opened its first U.S. department store in Henri Bendel, located in New York City. In 1997, Benefit went international with its expansion into Harrods in London. Soon after, the Benefit Cosmetics product website was launched.

LVMH acquired Benefit Cosmetics on September 14, 1999. In 2001, Benefit launched its first bath and boudoir line, Bathina. Benefit opened its first "Brow Bar" (a boutique specializing in brow shaping) in 2003, at Macy's Union Square, San Francisco.

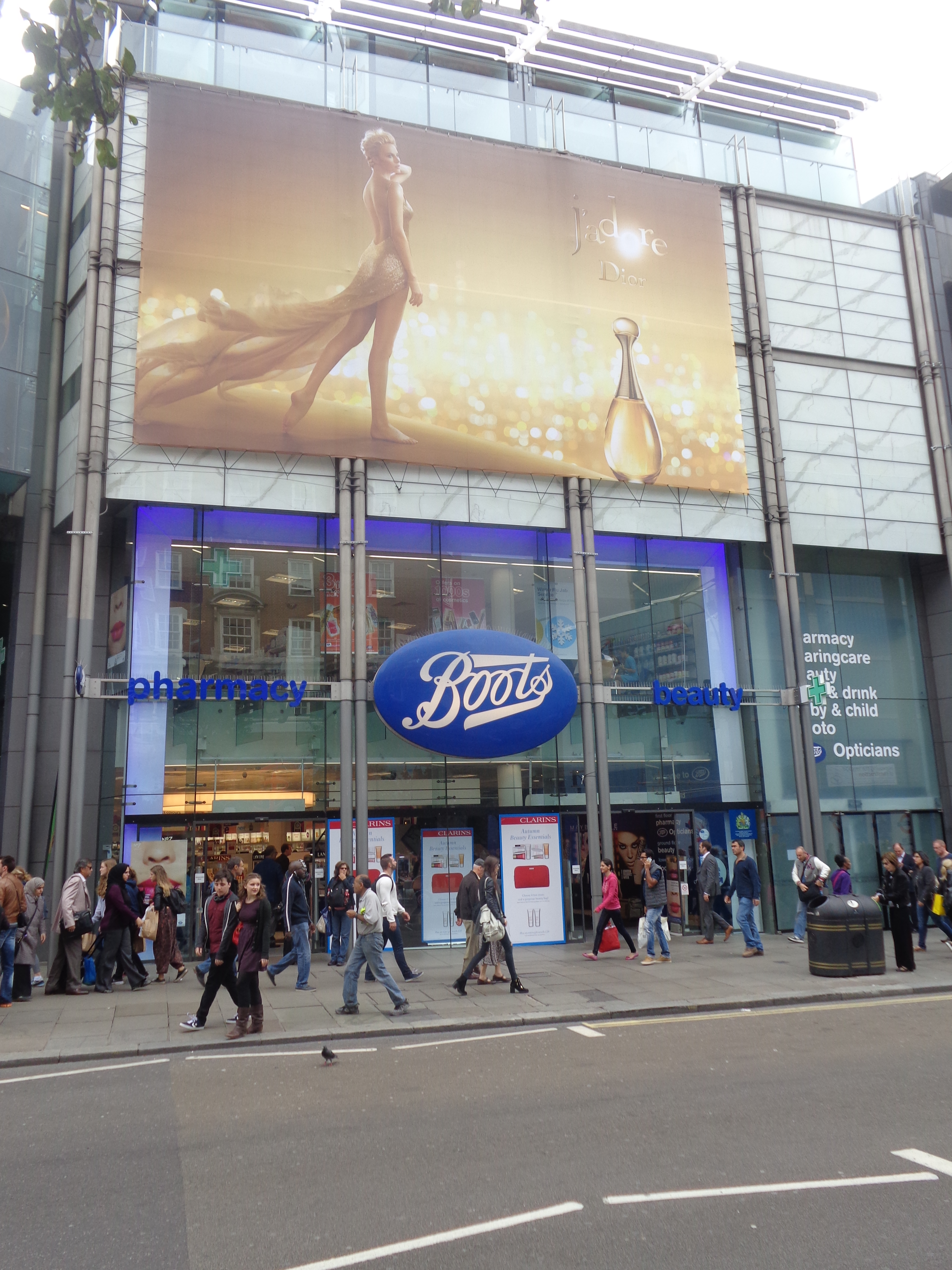
Boots chemist London

== Events ==
On April 21, 2012, Benefit Cosmetics won a Guinness World Record for the most eyebrow waxes performed in eight hours by a team, completing 382 treatments. Benefit beat their own record on May 20, 2017, when a team in Melbourne completed 435 waxes.

In 2022, Marks and Spencer announced their partnership with Benefit Cosmetics which would feature more than 200 products. Benefit Cosmetics products would be available online at M&S.com and in-store at five locations in Camberley, Cheshire Oaks, Handforth Dean, Hedge End, and Lisburn.

In 2023, Yasmin Benoit was the first asexual person to be in a Benefit Cosmetics campaign, alongside intersex activist Anick Soni.
