= Gordon Lewis (producer) =

Irish–British film producer and author

- Born: Gordon Lewis; Dublin, Ireland
- Occupations: Producer; Author
- Years active: 1970–present
- Website: www.secretchild.com

Gordon Lewis is an Irish–British film producer and author. Known for producing numerous music films and concerts for George Michael, Soft Cell, The Pretenders, Queen, John Lydon, The Cure, Talk Talk, Paul Weller, Roger Taylor, Depeche Mode, Daryl Hall & John Oates, Neil Young, Elton John, and David Bowie.

== Early life ==
Born in Dublin, Ireland, Lewis spent his childhood with his mother Cathleen at Regina Coeli, a haven for over 150 mothers and their children. Lewis move to London and left school at 15, and he started as a messenger at London Weekend Television (LWT).

== Career ==
In 1980, Lewis set up the Gordon Lewis Organisation (GLO). He produced co-productions with ABC network in the USA and ITV, 'Where Were You' TV series. GLO had offices in London and Los Angeles. Music acts Lewis produced include Queen, Bananarama, Terence Trent D'arby, John Lydon, Dead or Alive, ABC, Men Without Hats, and Bryan Ferry; and the feature film, 'The Cure in Orange', for cinema.

Lewis moved into making commercials. The first commercial, Tuborg Lager, featured the music of The Art of Noise and won nine International awards. The directors who worked for GLO were Tim Pope, Peter Care, Duncan Gibbons, Mark Romanek, Vaughan Arnell, and Jake Scott.

In 1987, Lewis moved into other businesses, opened the first stylish café bars and clubs in Soho, London, and became known as The Sultan of Soho.

Lewis wrote his debut book, Secret Child, in 2015, published by HarperCollins and became a Sunday Times bestseller. He released 2022 Little People and Soho Hustle in 2023. Coming in late 2024, Soho Hustle USA and Frank Duff, Forgotten Irish Hero.

Lewis and Ho produced award-winning short films. Yewweng Ho directed Secret Child (2018) and Mical (2020), which received rave reviews and many international film festival awards. In 2024, Dream of the Return won 8 awards. Darius Shu was the cinematographer for the films.

== Filmography ==
=== Music videos ===
Some of the music videos produced by Gordon Lewis

Year	Artist	Title
1976	Sex Pistols	Anarchy in the UK
1977	Rod Stewart	You're in My Heart
1977	Sex Pistols	Pretty Vacant
1977	Bonnie Tyler	It's A Heartache
1981	Soft Cell	Tainted Love
1982	Wham!	Young Guns
1982	Soft Cell	Sex Dwarf
1983	Kim Wilde	Dancing in the Dark
1983	Neil Young & The Shocking Pinks	Wonderin'
1983	Men Without Hats	The Safety Dance
1983	The Pretenders	2000 Miles
1984	Slade	Run Runaway
1984	Hall & Oates	Adult Education
1984	The Cars	Magic
1984	Queen	It's a Hard Life
1985	Depeche Mode	Shake the Disease
1985	The Style Council	Speak Like A Child
1985	Thomas Dolby	May The Cube Be With You
1985	The Cure	Close to Me
1985	Depeche Mode	It's Called A Heart
1985	Talk Talk	Life's What You Make It
1985	Bonnie Tyler	Loving You's a Dirty Job
1986	Talk Talk	It's My Life
1986	Bananarama	Venus
1986	Public Image Limited (John Lydon/Johnny Rotten)	Rise
1986	Jermaine Stewart	We Don't Have to Take Our Clothes Off
1987	Terence Trent D'Arby	Dance Little Sister
1987	ABC	King Without A Crown
1977	The The	Infected
1977	David Bowie	Time Will Crawl
1977	Lisa Lisa and Cult Jam	Someone to Love Me for Me
1988	The Pretenders	The Singles
1988	Mel & Kim	That's the Way It Is
1990	Natural History	The Very Best of Talk Talk
2000	The Pretenders	Greatest Hits
2001	The Cure	Greatest Hits
2003	David Bowie	Best of Bowie
2003	Queen	Greatest Video Hits

=== Films ===
Year	Title	Director
1982	Soft Cell: Non Stop Erotic Cabaret	Tim Pope
1987	The Cure in Orange	Tim Pope
2018	Secret Child	Yewweng Ho
2020	Mical	Yewweng Ho
2021	Dream of the Return	Yewweng Ho

== Books ==
- Secret Child (2015)
- Secret to Sultan (2020)
