= Arron Blake =

British actor (born 1987)

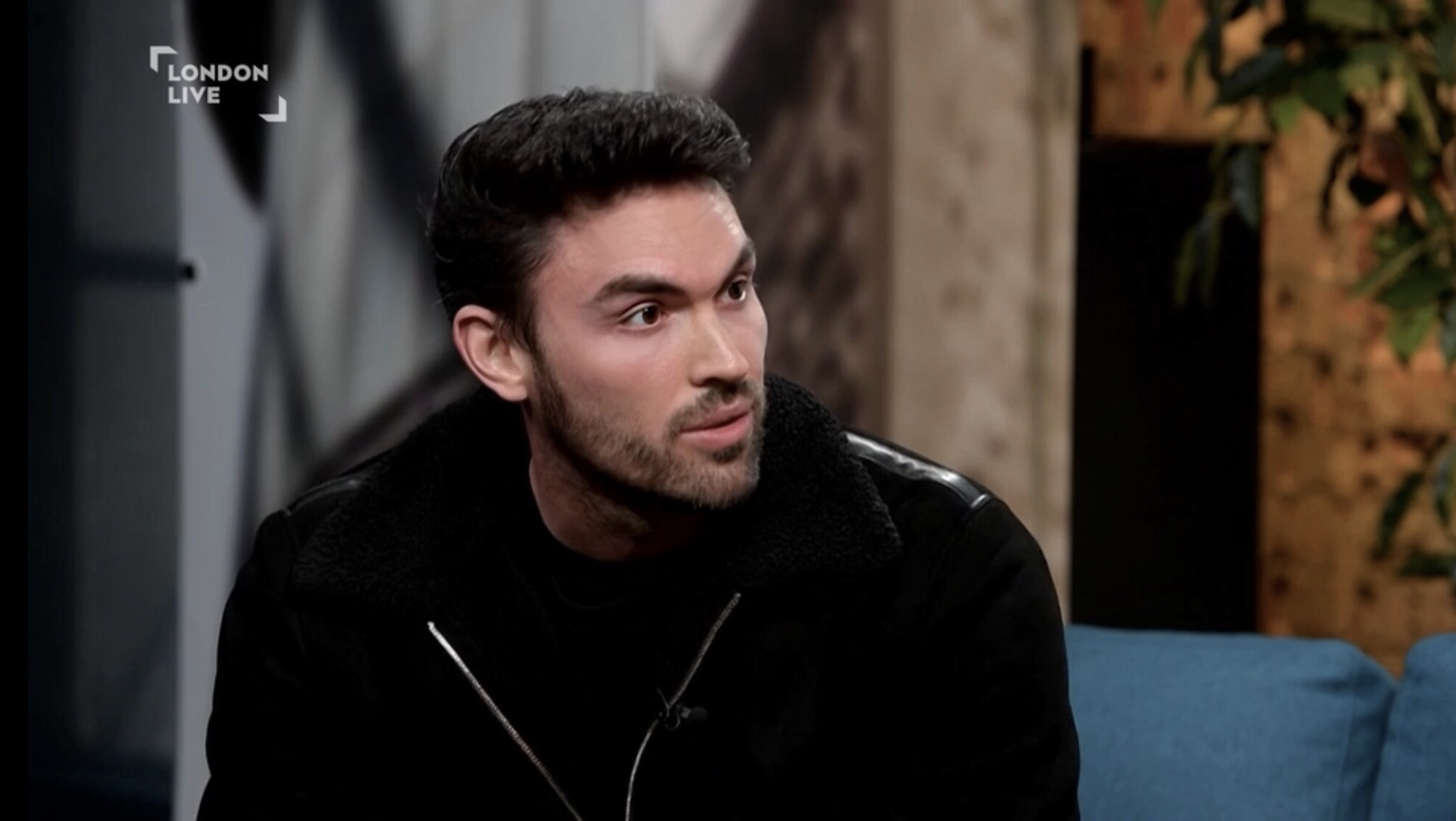
- Blake on London Live
- Born: 23 October 1987 (age 37); Isle of Wight, England
- Education: The Poor School
- Occupation: Actor
- Years active: 2011-present
- Known for: His Hands

Arron Blake (born 23 October 1987) is an English actor and director. A graduate of The Poor School in London, Blake's directorial debut short film His Hands with Darius Shu premiered at Tribeca Film Festival 2019 and was nominated for Best Narrative Short.

== Early life ==
Blake was born in the Isle of Wight. He worked as a carpenter before he pursued acting at The Poor School.

== Career ==
In 2018, Blake and cinematographer Darius Shu co-directed, wrote, and produced His Hands, with Blake also starring. Their directorial debut, His Hands had its premiere at Tribeca Film Festival 2019 in New York and was nominated for Best Narrative Short. It tells the story of two men meeting, with themes of sexuality, loneliness, identity and ageism. The film was made on a low budget of £400, with no dialogue. The film was made available on Amazon Prime Video.

In 2020, Blake starred in ITV's Breaking the Band, playing lead singer Paul Stanley from the band Kiss, which showed on REELZ in the US.

Blake starred and co-directed I AM Norman with Darius Shu in 2021.

== Reception ==
Mark Gatiss reviewed Blake's film His Hands as, "A beguilingly beautiful gem, Arron Blake and Darius Shu's His Hands defies easy analysis. Shot through with strange, homoerotic melancholy it's ravishing to look at and haunts the memory long after." Attitude noted "Blake and Shu cleverly make use of colours, images, ideas in place of speech, and the film has a unique energy all the better for it." Film Threat said it had "glorious cinematography, the precise editing, moody atmosphere, and impressive acting it is clear that a lot of effort went into the film." UK Film Review stated that "The performances are really strong, Blake presents a formidable on screen presence that is loaded with palpable vigour." The Advocate said "Blake's menacing character engages in an intense ritual with the old man that includes donning stunning diamond earrings and black lipstick before the night turns even darker." Vulture Hound said his performance was "Beautifully realised". HeyUGuys said Blake's acting was "impressive, even with no lines, the story is clear to see." Indie Shorts Mag describe Blake's performance as '...sleek'.

Blake was interviewed on London Live after returning from Tribeca.

== Awards and nominations ==
Year	Festival	Category	Work	Result
2018	Oniros Film Awards	Best Noir Film	His Hands	Won
2018	Oniros Film Awards	Best Silent Film	His Hands	Nominated
2019	Tribeca Film Festival	Best Narrative Short	His Hands	Nominated
2019	Canada Shorts Film Festival	Award of Excellence	His Hands	Won
2019	London International Motion Pictures Award	Best Narrative / Fiction UK Short Film	His Hands	Nominated
2019	Queen Palm International Film Festival	Best Short Film - Silent	His Hands	Won
2019	Queen Palm International Film Festival	Best Director	His Hands	Won
