= His Hands =

2019 British silent psychological thriller short film

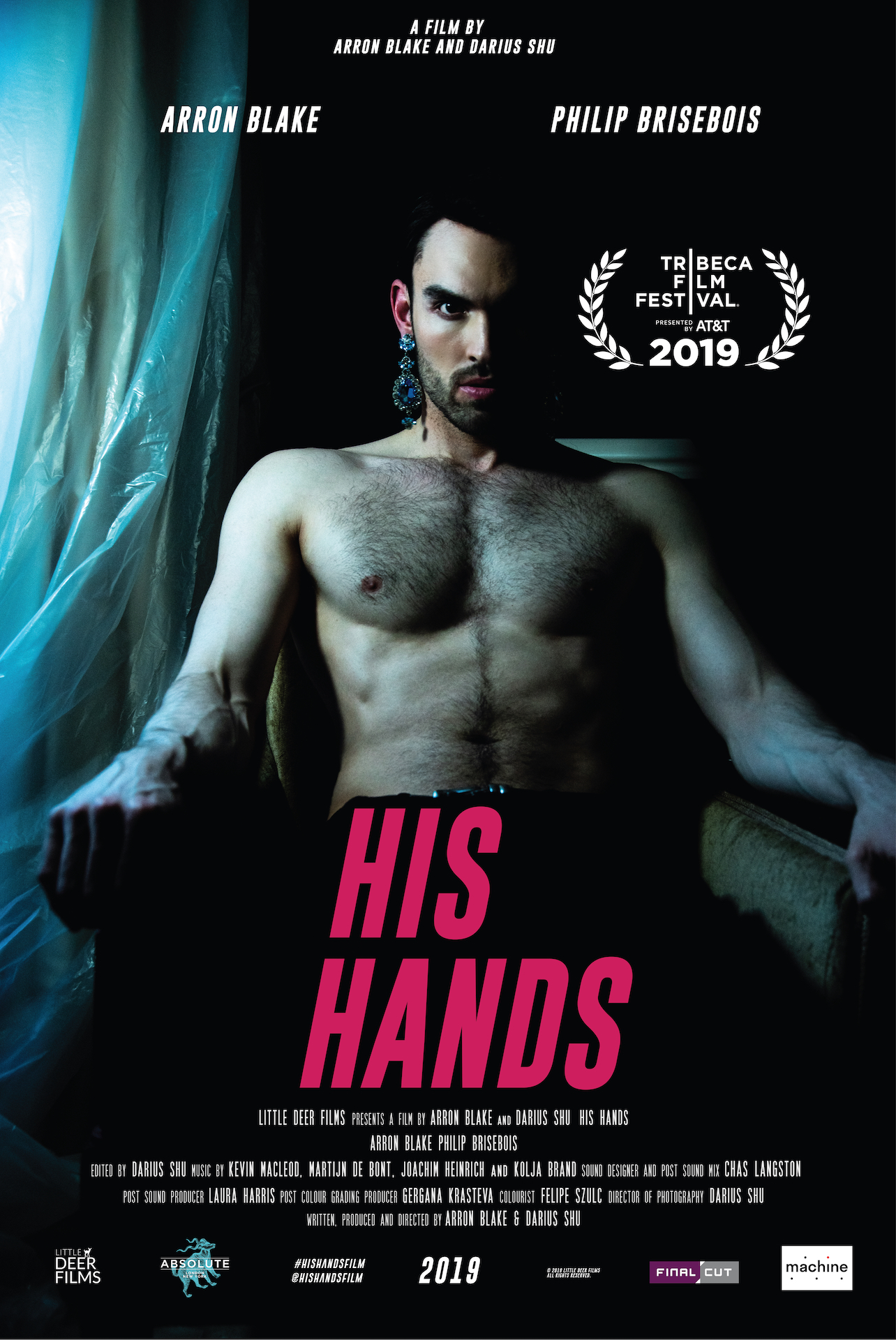
- Directed by: Arron Blake; Darius Shu
- Written by: Arron Blake; Darius Shu
- Produced by: Arron Blake; Darius Shu
- Starring: Arron Blake; Philip Brisebois
- Cinematography: Darius Shu
- Edited by: Darius Shu
- Production company: Little Deer Films Silverprince Pictures
- Release dates: 28 April 2019 (United States); 7 August 2019 (United Kingdom)
- Running time: 14 minutes
- Country: United Kingdom
- Language: English
- Budget: £400

His Hands is a British silent psychological thriller short film written and directed by Arron Blake and Darius Shu released in 2019 by Little Deer Films and Silverprince Pictures. It tells the story of two men of different age meeting for the strangest encounter of their lives. The film stars Arron Blake and Philip Brisebois as the film explores themes of sexuality, loneliness, ageism and identity. The film had its world premiere at Tribeca Film Festival 2019 and was nominated for Best Narrative Short. The film's streaming debut was on Amazon Prime Video.

== Synopsis ==
Two men, totally different in both age and outlook, have the strangest encounter of their lives. A caring friend? Calculating enemy? Whose intentions are honourable? Whose is corrupt? Is the relationship compatible or incompatible? Sick or ultimately indefensible?.

== Cast ==
- Arron Blake as Young Man
- Philip Brisebois as Old Man

== Production ==
In 2018, directors Blake and Shu begun writing His Hands at the British Film Institute and wanted to push themselves to create a visually beautiful film on an inconceivable budget of just £400 for their directorial debut. Philip Brisebois was cast to play the old man in the film with Blake starring alongside and it was Brisebois comeback to acting after 50 years. The film was shot on a single camera with only a three-man crew using 95 percent natural light. Blake and Shu's aim was to create a modern silent film that was fresh and create a multi-layer thought provoking story. Blake and Shu said, “We wanted to create a film that speaks to the audience through strong performances, unusual imagery, lighting and sound."

== Release ==
His Hands had its world premiere at the Tribeca Film Festival on April 28, 2019, with the cast and directors in attendance. The film was made available to stream on Amazon Prime on August 7, 2019.

== Reception ==
=== Critical response ===
On Amazon Prime Video, the film has an approval rating of 98% based on 18 reviews, with an average rating of 5/5. Attitude magazine, reviewed His Hands (2019) calling, "It's testament to Blake and Shu's skill, direction, and cinematography that the film, which features absolutely no dialogue, manages to convey an incredible sense of mood and feeling throughout."

Mark Gatiss, the producer of Netflix-BBC television series Dracula and Sherlock, reviewed His Hands as, "A beguilingly beautiful gem, Arron Blake and Darius Shu's His Hands defies easy analysis. Shot through with strange, homoerotic melancholy it's ravishing to look at and haunts the memory long after."

Film Threat praised His Hands as, "Beautifully well shot, exuding a mysterious atmosphere in each frame. The acting and editing are both excellent, and the story's refusal to hold the audience's hand is commendable" while Unsettled Magazine reviewed His Hands as "a masterpiece built on suspense and appealing imagery."

UK Film Review gave the film 4 out of 5 stating, "The performances are really strong, Blake presents a formidable on screen presence that is loaded with palpable vigour." and that the film "benefits from a richness in ambiguity in the storytelling and bold creativity in the filmmaking. The journey is nerve shatteringly entertaining and it has superb cinematic appeal."

The Advocate magazine pointed out that, "the cinematography of His Hands offers an unnerving experience through dark, haunting images with no dialogue."

Movie Buff gave the film 4 out of 5 stars praising it to be a modern silent film and writing, "the actors had to ‘show without telling’ and I felt as though they each had me gripping the edge of my chair throughout the film" and that "it is beautifully shot and looks at subject matter that is hotly debated at the moment."

FilmInk called His Hands as, "cinema in its purest form, where the audience is meant to rely solely on visual and pictorial literacy to make heads or tails of any of it ...it is art as it should be." Vulture House describe His Hands as "a wonderful work of art ...Very much like a painting in a gallery" and that it, "masters the art of what is not seen." Gscene Magazine said that, "His Hands presents us with images of torture, attraction, loneliness, ageism, androgyny and wherever else your fertile mind can take you to." HeyUGuys gave the film 4 out of 5 stars and praised the film as "beautifully written" and "the editing and directing are brilliant ... this independent film has clearly used every penny wisely."

Indie Short Mag gave the film 5 out of 5 stars with excellence in all areas in direction, cinematography, screenplay, music and editing as it "... blur lines between eroticism and violence." Viddy Well praised the film as "...cleanly composed, erotically charged, and ripe with atmosphere and oddity that you can't help but lean into it." Viddy Well also complimented Blake and Shu's direction as "...taut and controlled, with notes of Nicolas Winding Refn, David Lynch, Denis Villeneuve, and David Fincher, and all of their visuals play directly into the film's theme...His Hands is a thought-provoking short that's masterfully erected."

Blake and Shu made their live television appearance in an interview on London Live after the success of Tribeca Film Festival.

== Awards and nominations ==
Year	Festival	Category	Work	Result
2018	Gold Movie Awards	Best Cinematography	His Hands	Won
2018	Oniros Film Awards	Best Noir Film	His Hands	Won
2018	Oniros Film Awards	Best Silent Film	His Hands	Nominated
2018	Oniros Film Awards	Best Cinematography	His Hands	Nominated
2019	Tribeca Film Festival	Best Narrative Short	His Hands	Nominated
2019	Canada Shorts Film Festival	Award of Excellence	His Hands	Won
2019	London International Motion Pictures Award	Best Narrative / Fiction UK Short Film	His Hands	Nominated
2019	Queen Palm International Film Festival	Best Cinematography	His Hands	Won
2019	Queen Palm International Film Festival	Best Short Film - Silent	His Hands	Won
2019	Queen Palm International Film Festival	Best Director	His Hands	Won
2019	Queen Palm International Film Festival	Best Editor	His Hands	Won
