= Shiva Raichandani =

British dancer (born 1993)

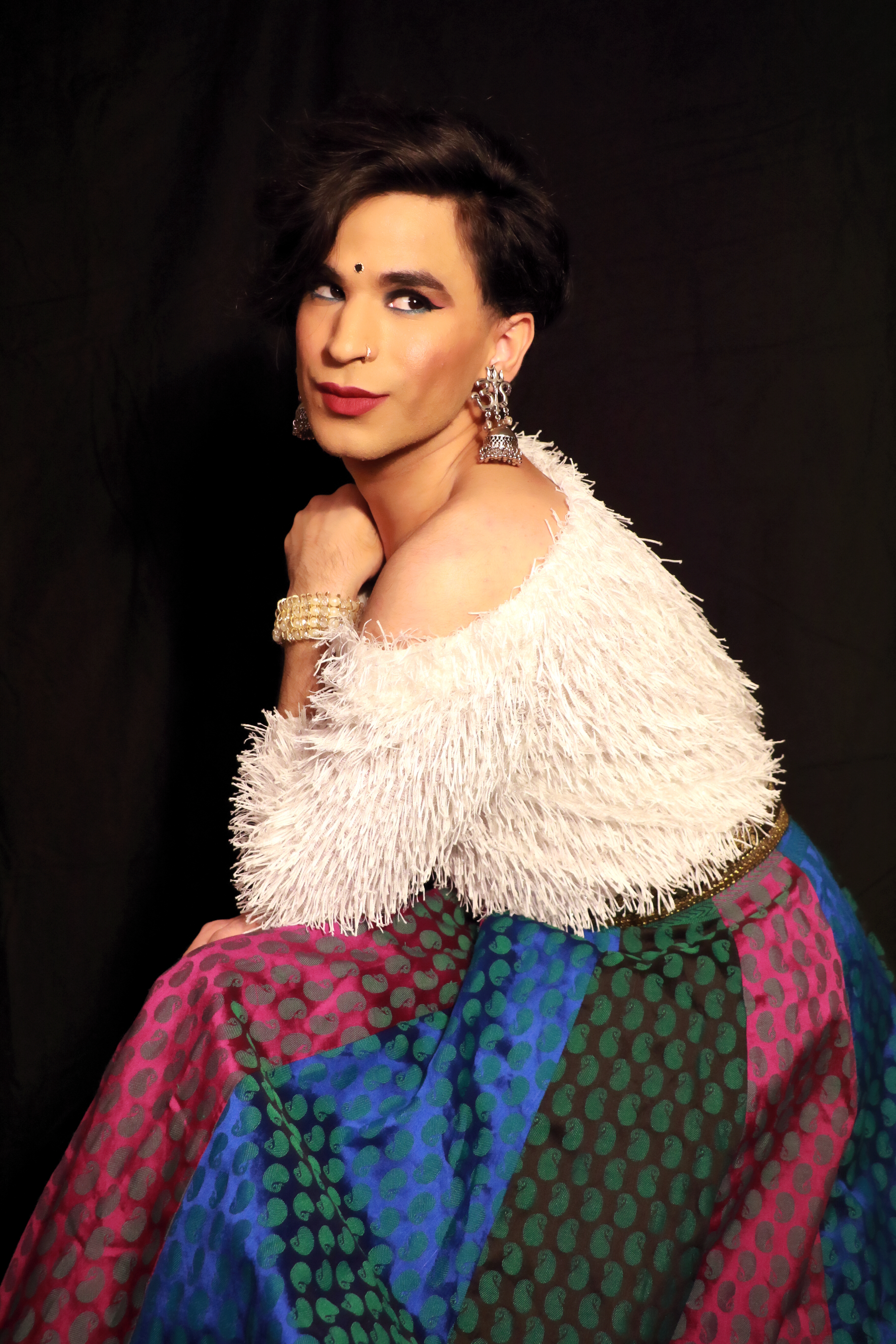
- Born: 26 October 1993 (age 32); Hong Kong
- Education: The University of Leeds
- Alma mater: Good Shepherd International School
- Occupation: Artist
- Known for: Britain's Got Talent; India's Got Talent
- Website: shivaraichandani.com

Shiva Raichandani (born 1993) is a British non-binary film and TV director, producer, screenwriter, dancer, and actor. Their works exist at the intersections of creating positive gender-expansive representation in mainstream media, addressing mental health stigma (especially within the South Asian diaspora context), and using the performing arts to drive positive social change.

They were selected as a recipient of the 2023 BFI and BAFTA LGBTQIA+ Mentoring Scheme, and identified by Attitude Magazine as one of 2023’s Top 10 trailblazers for Film, TV, and Music in the United Kingdom.

Raichandani is known for having been a semi-finalist on Britain's Got Talent, and a contestant on India's Got Talent and France's Got Talent with the London School of Bollywood.

Their debut film, Queer Parivaar (2022), won the BAFTA-qualifying Iris Prize 'Best British Short' award, making it available for broadcast and streaming on Channel 4.

In May 2021, Raichandani won the inaugural Netflix Documentary Talent Fund to direct a film on Shane 'ShayShay' Konno and their Pan-Asian drag and cabaret collective, The Bitten Peach. As reported by Variety, the documentary is titled 'Peach Paradise', and premiered on TikTok’s first-ever live film showcase.

Shiva’s latest BAFTA-nominated documentary called ‘Always, Asifa’ (commissioned by Together TV’s Diverse Film Fund) premiered at the BFI’s London Film Festival.

Raichandani also freelances as a speaker and consultant on inclusive LGBTQIA+ practices for corporate and non-profit organisations, and is a D&I Content Consultant at New Inclusion.

Shiva has degrees in Psychology, Counselling, and Media Communication, and uses the combined knowledge from them with their lived experiences to tap into the discourses of intersectional identities. They use digital platforms to mobilise and create safe community spaces to champion diverse talent and drive topical conversations around societal issues.

== Appearances ==
- Strictly Come Dancing (2022) - Shiva made a brief appearance in the 20th season of the BBC show during a Bollywood-inspired routine choreographed by Prabhleen Oberoi of Sapnay Dance.
- Queer Britain (2022) - Photographs of Shiva are displayed at the U.K.’s first museum exclusively showcasing LGBTQ+ art and history.
- H&M (2022) - Shiva was featured in H&M’s Diwali Campaign.
- Cannes Lions (2019) - Along with Asad Dhunna of The Unmistakables, Raichandani addressed the topic 'Why We Don't Need Another Diversity Talk' through a performance with a custom track "Hell No", a parody of the popular Slumdog Millionaire song 'Jai Ho'.
- Britain's Got Talent (2017) - Raichandani, along with the London School of Bollywood, challenged Bollywood's heteronormative narratives by bringing gender fluidity to the forefront and making it to the semi-finals.
- India's Got Talent (2018) - Raichandani competed with the London School of Bollywood and performed with Karan Johar on the main stage. In a blog post Raichandani writes: "With a routine like this in which a non-binary gender fluid 'star' takes center stage instead of the quintessential 'hero' and 'heroine', we hoped to add to the discourse around gender fluidity and queerness that is too often ignored in the Bollywood industry."
- France's Got Talent (2018) - Raichandani competed with the London School of Bollywood performing their routine around gender fluidity.
- Netflix (2018) - Raichandani was featured in a video titled What I Wish You Knew: About Being Nonbinary, where they discussed gender identity with Jacob Tobia, Liv Hewson, and Lachlan Watson.
- TEDx London (2018) - Raichandani gave the introductory remarks of the event by touching upon non-binary representation in Bollywood.
- Google's 'I am Remarkable' (2020) - Raichandani delivered the keynote discussing positive gender-diverse representation in Bollywood dance and storytelling.

Raichandani has also been featured on UK Black Pride, Pride in London, Instagram, Bollyshake, and London Queer Fashion Show.

== Filmography ==
Shiva Raichandani's Filmography
| Year | Film/Series | Company | Distributor | Role | Notes | Awards/Nominations |
|---|---|---|---|---|---|---|
| 2021 | Eternals | Marvel | Walt Disney Company | Bollywood Dancer | | |
| 2022 | Queer Parivaar | Raisilience Ltd. | Channel 4 | Director / Writer / Producer / Star | Short film | Iris Prize - Best British Short Film Award |
| 2022 | Peach Paradise | Raisilience Ltd. | Netflix | Director / Writer / Producer | Documentary | |
| 2022 | Always, Asifa | Raisilience Ltd. | Together TV | Director / Producer | Documentary | BAFTA TV Award Nomination - Short Form Programme |

Raichandani produces films under their production company Raisilience Ltd.
