= Hayley Cropper =

Fictional character from Coronation Street

- Coronation Street character
- Portrayed by: Julie Hesmondhalgh
- Duration: 1998–2014
- First appearance: Episode 4341; 26 January 1998
- Last appearance: Episode 8306; 22 January 2014
- Introduced by: Brian Park
- Spin-off appearances: Coronation Street: Romanian Holiday (2009)
- Crossover appearances: East Street (2010)
In-universe information
- Occupation: Factory supervisor Café Waitress
- Father: Harry Patterson
- Mother: Maggie Patterson
- Husband: Roy Cropper (2010–2014)
- Sons: Christian Gatley
- Adoptive daughters: Fiz Brown (foster)
- Grandsons: Sam Gatley
- Granddaughters: Maisie Gatley
- Aunts: Monica Patterson; Barbara Morgan
- Other relatives: Bert

Hayley Cropper (also Patterson) is a fictional character from the British ITV soap opera Coronation Street, played by Julie Hesmondhalgh. The character first appeared in the episode first broadcast on 26 January 1998. Hayley was the first transgender character in a British soap opera and was the first permanent transgender character in the world of serialised drama. She was married to Roy Cropper (David Neilson). After nearly ten years on the show, Hesmondhalgh decided to take a break for a year in order to spend more time with her family. She left on 22 October 2007 and returned on 17 November 2008.

Hesmondhalgh won numerous awards for her portrayal of Hayley, but announced her departure from the show on 11 January 2013. Her final scenes were filmed on 18 November 2013 and aired on 22 January 2014. In the episode, Hayley takes her own life, after living with terminal pancreatic cancer. Hesmondhalgh has insisted that it was a "right to die" storyline not 'an assisted suicide' storyline. Hayley's funeral aired on 31 January 2014.

Hesmondhalgh's portrayal of Hayley, and her on-screen chemistry with fellow actor David Neilson, encouraged the writers to allow the character to evolve from a brief love interest for Roy to a popular long-term character. Hayley would go on to spend 16 years on Coronation Street, always seeing the good in people and nurturing Fiz Brown (Jennie McAlpine) and Becky McDonald (Katherine Kelly) from troubled young women to kind, caring, individuals. In her later years, Hayley formed an unlikely, yet notably close, friendship with Carla Connor (Alison King) and although it was obvious the pair were from completely different walks of life, they came to respect and care for each other.

== Character creation ==
=== Casting ===
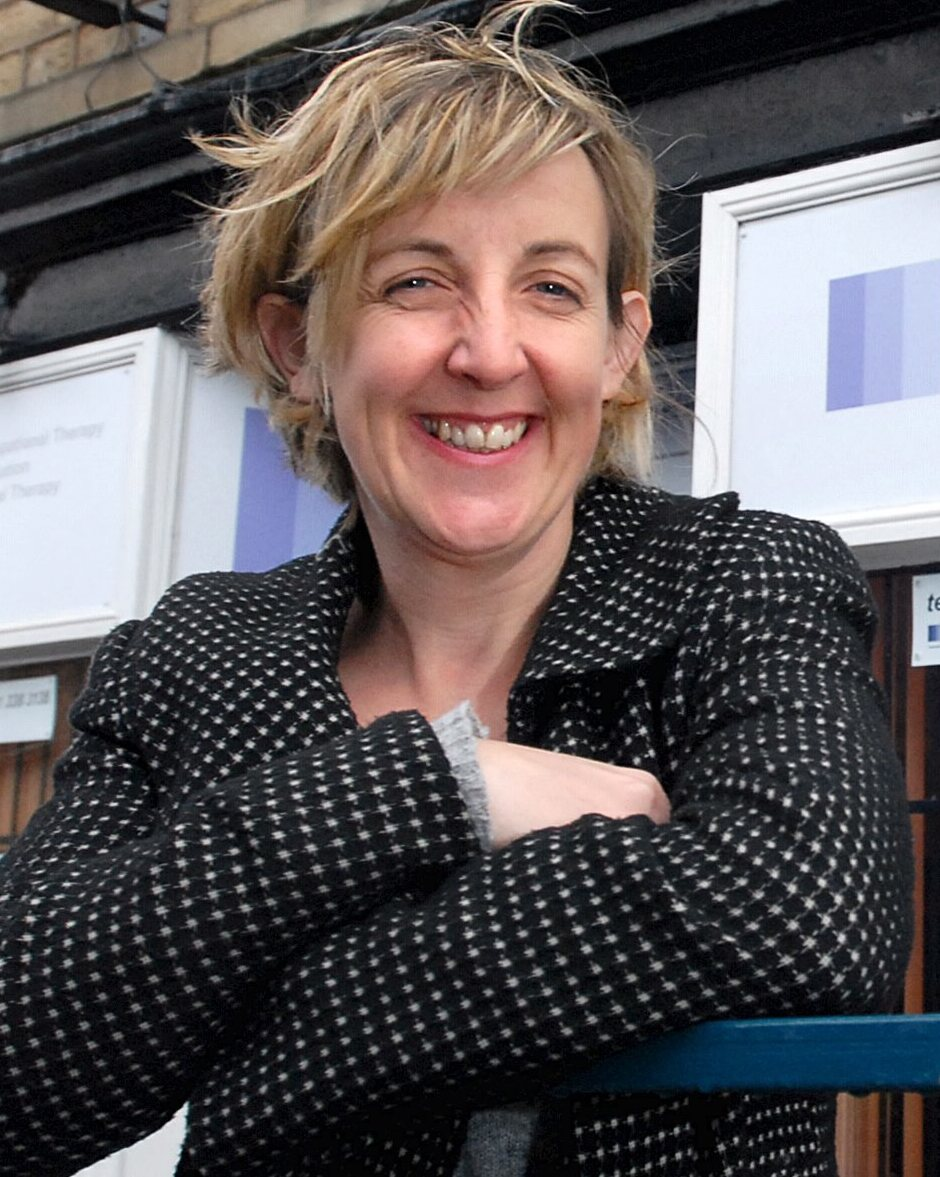
Julie Hesmondhalgh (pictured) got her "dream job" as Hayley.

Initially, it was intended that Hayley would only appear for two months, it was thought that this would help increase ratings as well as show a new side to Roy Cropper (David Neilson). Actor Julie Hesmondhalgh first came to the attention of the casting director while dressed in drag in a production of 'Much Ado About Nothing'. Hesmondhalgh only knew she was auditioning to play a "fun" character, so arrived "all Bet Lynch, in [her] leopard skin and red lippy". When she learned Hayley would be transgender, she was nervous, but "then it dawned on me that this was actually my 'dream job' and I desperately wanted it." The character of Hayley Cropper is around four years older than Hesmondhalgh.

=== Characterisation and identity ===
What's on TV describes the character as quiet, and kind-hearted. For a short period of time, after the actor took a one-year break from the show, the producers decided to change her ways. After a brief period of resettlement, she resumed her more familiar temperament of being generally supportive and friendly to the other characters.

== Development ==
=== Relationships ===
Hayley's only romantic relationship is with Roy. The characters were first friends and they started a relationship, until Hayley revealed her past history. Roy initially rejected her, but missed their friendship and three months later, followed her to Amsterdam where she was living on a houseboat, recuperating from her surgery. He persuaded her that they should work on their relationship, and as a result, she returned to Weatherfield where she became a machinist in Mike Baldwin's (Johnny Briggs) lingerie factory, Underworld.

Roy later proposed to Hayley at a fancy-dress disco on St. Valentine's Day 1999. At that time, they could not legally marry, since Hayley was still seen as a male in the eyes of the law. Eventually, they found a female vicar who would help them, and they were united in a blessing ceremony held in Roy's Rolls on 23 April 1999. As a wedding present to Roy, Hayley officially changed her name by deed poll to Hayley Anne Cropper.

Since the passing of the Gender Recognition Act 2004 in UK law, it has been possible for transgender people to change the gender on their birth certificates. This was legally valid when marriage was only for different-sex couples. In 2010, following a discussion of the ramifications of their not being legally married, Roy and Hayley decided to make it official. It was revealed that Hayley had applied for, and received, her new birth certificate, and so, after some disagreements about the cost and motives for marriage, the plans were made for the wedding. The couple finally married on 30 August 2010 at a stately home in Cheshire, and almost everyone but the bride arrived by steam train.

Their relationship was tested by various storylines including Tracy Barlow's (Kate Ford) deceit, Hayley's secret son and Hayley's absence from the street. Briefly, upon her return, there was a difficult situation where she had developed a crush on one of her co-workers in Africa (further reading below). They eventually worked out their differences.

=== Pancreatic cancer and suicide ===
On 11 January 2013, it was announced that Hesmondhalgh would leave Coronation Street at the end of her contract. The actress recorded her final scenes on 18 November 2013, being screened on 20 January 2014, and the producers came up with a dramatic exit storyline for her character. Hesmondhalgh revealed that she wanted to pursue new projects, saying "I've had the most wonderful and happy time in the life changing 15/16 years I've been in Corrie, and I owe so much to the show and the special team that make it happen. The decision to hang up Hayley's red anorak was a tough one, but doing the play at the Royal Exchange last year made me realise that there's life in the old dog yet (!) and that there are other things I want to try." Hayley's exit storyline saw her diagnosed with terminal pancreatic cancer. On 20 January 2014, Hayley died in Roy's arms after drinking a lethal cocktail. The episode attracted 9.7 million viewers – the show's highest figure in almost a year.

== Storylines ==
Hayley Patterson is a shy shop supervisor at Firman's Freezers. Her friend and colleague Alma Baldwin (Amanda Barrie) introduced her to Roy Cropper (David Neilson) and they became friends – until Hayley told him that she is transgender and used to be called Harold. Roy cannot cope and initially rejects her but realises that their friendship is more important than Hayley's secret. After affirming their mutual attraction, Hayley goes to Amsterdam for private gender reassignment surgery. When she returns to Weatherfield, she starts work at Underworld. Hayley chooses not to disclose her transgender status, but she is forcibly outed when Alma's husband and factory boss Mike discovers a Tax Office error, showing her deadname. Mike fires her as a result. Although the factory staff and Street residents initially taunt her, she eventually gets her job back and most Street residents gradually accept her.

In 2001, Roy and Hayley decide to become foster parents. Their first child is teenager Fiz Brown (Jennie McAlpine), who returns to care after falsely claiming that Roy hit her. Fiz returns later that year and becomes good friends with Roy and Hayley. The couple then foster a young boy, Wayne Hayes (Gary Damer), but go on the run with him, wanting to protect him from his abusive stepfather. They are arrested for kidnap and Hayley is held on remand for objecting to her bail conditions but is released when Wayne's mother makes a statement about her marriage. This prevents Roy and Hayley fostering, or working with, any more young people.

In 2003, while Hayley is away, nursing her sick aunt, scheming Tracy Preston (Kate Ford) bets Bev Unwin (Susie Blake) that she can bed the man supposedly least likely to be unfaithful – Roy. Tracy drugs Roy at Peter (Chris Gascoyne) and Shelley Barlow's (Sally Lindsay) wedding reception and claims to have slept with him. Roy is desperate to keep this from Hayley but breaks down and admits everything. When confronting Tracy, the Croppers are stunned when Tracy tells them that she is pregnant with Roy's baby and plans to have a termination if the Croppers do not want to adopt it. Roy and Hayley see an opportunity to raise a child and pay Tracy £25,000. The Croppers' relationship becomes increasingly strained, including a suicide attempt by Roy, but they pull through. Roy gets suspicious when Tracy goes on holiday for three weeks and realizing how easy it would be for Tracy to disappear with the cash and the baby, Roy insists she marry him (giving him parental responsibility of the baby) or the deal is off. She agrees and they marry. After the baby is born, Tracy admits to Peter that Steve McDonald (Simon Gregson) is the father (they had a one-night stand shortly before she spent the night with Roy). The baby's true paternity is revealed at Steve's wedding to ex-wife Karen (Suranne Jones), when Tracy demands that baby Patience be returned to her and the Croppers, heartbroken, do so and Tracy repays the cash to Roy and Hayley. Steve and Karen marry, despite Tracy's bombshell, and Karen gets her revenge by gatecrashing the christening. Patience Cropper is renamed Amy Barlow and the Croppers are her godparents.

Following the death of her aunt Monica in September 2007, Hayley discovers that she has a son, Christian Gatley (Andrew Turner). She hires a private investigator to track him down and introduces herself as his aunt. Roy confronts Hayley when he sees money has been withdrawn from their joint bank account and she tells Roy everything. Disapproving of lies, Roy insists Hayley tell Christian the truth about how they are related and Hayley does but Christian does not react well and storms off. When Hayley finds him later, Christian is still angry and punches her when she refuses to leave him alone. On her return to the café, she makes it clear that she blames Roy and this causes problems. They decide to go camping in a bid to mend their issues. Following this, in October 2007, Hayley leaves the Street to go on volunteer work in Mozambique for a year.

Hayley returns in November 2008; it is clear that she is not entirely happy, appearing evasive and she tells Roy that she wants to return to her charity work, as she has fallen for Olaf, the project team leader. When catching up with Tilly, another volunteer, she learns Olaf is not the man she thought he was and decides to stay with Roy. She decides not to return to Underworld and wants to become a social worker but her police record (for the abduction of Wayne in 2001), rules her ineligible to work with children. She works in the café and then becomes supervisor at the factory in 2009.

In May 2010, Hayley and Roy argue when she suggests that they have a lavish wedding, now that the law has changed and their union can now be officially recognised. Roy agrees but he is more concerned with inheritance law, upsetting Hayley, so she moves in with friend Anna Windass (Debbie Rush). On 1 June 2010, Robbie Sloan (James Fleet) tricks Hayley to go to the factory, telling her that Carla Connor (Alison King) has had an accident, when in reality, Robbie has tied Carla to a chair and duct taped her mouth shut. Once there, Hayley sees Carla bound and gagged but Robbie pulls out a gun on her before she can escape, and ties her to a chair too. Killer Tony Gordon (Gray O'Brien) arrives, takes the gag off Carla's mouth and threatens them, revealing that Hayley is there as revenge against Roy, who convinced Tony to confess his crimes to the police, and says he will kill her and Carla. After Maria Connor (Samia Ghadie) accidentally interrupts and raises the alarm, Roy rushes to Underworld but can not help her, while Carla pleads with Tony to let Hayley go – Tony eventually relents and throws Hayley out. She is taken care of by paramedics and she and Roy tell one another they love each other before watching the factory blow up, after Tony sets fire to the building, killing himself but Carla manages to untie herself and escapes.

Later that week, Roy proposes to Hayley and she accepts. Mary Taylor (Patti Clare) intervenes in the wedding preparations and, after weeks of muscling in, Hayley and Roy tell her they do not want her to be a part of the wedding, despite Hayley wearing her vintage wedding dress. On 30 August 2010, the train carriage that Hayley and bridesmaids Fiz and Becky McDonald (Katherine Kelly) decouples from the steam train that is transporting the groom and wedding guests to the venue, due to Mary's meddling. However, they do get to the venue on time and Hayley marries Roy. In June 2011, Roy's mother Sylvia Goodwin (Stephanie Cole) – who moved in with the Croppers earlier in the year – is suspicious when, after expressing a longing for grandchildren, she finds out Hayley cannot have children. After rummaging through her things, she finds a prescription for some hormone tablets and assumes Hayley is menopausal until Tracy tells her that Hayley used to be a man. Sylvia is initially outraged but, as of July 2011, appears to be coming round and accepts Hayley for who she is.

Hayley is heartbroken when Becky decides to leave Weatherfield in January 2012 but gets a call a few months later, telling her that she is engaged to her new boyfriend. Later in the year, Roy and Hayley visit Palm Springs, California to visit Sylvia and her companion Milton Fanshaw (Robert Vaughn). Roy returns without Hayley, who is caring for Sylvia as she isn't well. Hayley returns later that year and supports Roy when they discover that his father died in May 2013. Strange happenings begin occurring in the café and Roy thinks Beth Tinker (Lisa George) and her family are responsible. Deirdre Barlow (Anne Kirkbride) finds Roy sleepwalking on the Red Rec and returns him to Hayley and Sylvia. They watch the CCTV footage and it proves that Roy is behind all of the rearranged furniture. Hayley decides that Roy should see a doctor and tells him she will have the same tests done, which Roy finds comfort in. Hayley is called back to the Medical Centre the following week and the doctor tells Hayley that she has abnormal liver function and needs an ultrasound scan for further investigation. Hayley confides in Sylvia on the day of her scan but swears her to secrecy. The doctor tells Hayley that there is a blockage in her bile duct and Hayley tells Sylvia that she may have cancer and breaks down in her arms. The following week, Carla insists on going with Hayley for a CT scan where Hayley is diagnosed with stage-two pancreatic cancer. She is told she needs an operation and chemotherapy to get rid of the cancer. Later, Hayley breaks down at work and Carla comforts her. Hayley realises that she has to tell Roy so goes home and tells Roy and Sylvia. When Sylvia leaves Roy and Hayley alone, Roy holds Hayley's hand and starts pestering Hayley to drink herbal tea, so she confides in Carla again. Hayley goes for the operation to unblock her bile duct, accompanied by Roy. Hayley does well and is invited to Audrey Roberts' (Sue Nicholls) birthday party at the Bistro. Hayley and Sylvia go but Hayley is devastated when Roy tells everyone that she has pancreatic cancer. Upset, Hayley runs home and is followed by Sylvia. Later, Roy tells her that he wishes that he could halve her pain and Hayley tells him that she could die and the pair embrace passionately. When Leanne Tilsley (Jane Danson) and her half-sister Eva Price (Catherine Tyldesley), argue at the factory, Leanne pushes Eva into Hayley, so Carla throws Leanne out. Hayley gets fed up with people being sympathetic so she and Roy go on holiday before her operation to remove her tumour. Carla gives Hayley some time off and Mary lends them her motor home. Hayley and Roy return a couple of weeks later and learn that Sylvia has gone to live with her sister, Roy's aunt Jean.

Roy organises a romantic dinner for their third wedding anniversary but Hayley is upset as she completely forgot. Roy then assures Hayley that he is not angry, and she confides in Carla before going to the hospital, preparing for her operation. Roy and Hayley are told that the operation – if successful – should last six hours. Hayley goes down to theatre at 13:05 and gives Roy her wedding ring to look after. Roy is devastated when the consultant tells Roy and Hayley that her cancer is terminal. He says she could live up to about six months to a year. Devastated but philosophical, Hayley begins to make a bucket list of everything that she wants to do before she dies, one of which is teaching Roy how to drive. Hayley has a nightmare about being "Harold" again, making her regret the way things ended with her son, Christian. She decides to tell Fiz about Christian, confusing Roy but he comes round to the idea of Hayley contacting Christian, so she leaves a message on his mobile. While waiting for him to call back, she focuses on throwing a birthday party for Roy in The Rovers. She goes with Roy to his driving lesson, which was a disaster. Hayley gets a message from Christian, wanting to meet in a café in Bury. Roy goes with Hayley but Christian sends her a text, saying that he cannot go through with it. Roy and Hayley take Fiz's daughter, Hope, and Tyrone Dobbs' (Alan Halsall) baby girl Ruby to the park, Christian arrives and asks Anna where Hayley is. He decides to call her but she left her phone behind. Christian decides to wait and they talk but Hayley decides to take Roy and Christian to The Rovers, where Christian reveals that he is married and has two children, Sam and Maisie. Hayley says she would love to meet them but Christian wants to wait until they are 16 years of age, upsetting Hayley. Christian repeatedly makes inappropriate remarks unintentionally so Roy shouts at him, before taking Hayley home. Hayley insists that they attend a cancer support group, where they meet Jane Rayner (Heather Bleasdale) and her husband Jeff (Jim Millea). Hayley is inspired by Jane's strength and confidence, despite dying from pancreatic cancer, but Roy tells Hayley that he found her highly inappropriate and inconsiderate. Hayley is delighted to learn that Roy has booked a day off so they can go to Blackpool. They have a wonderful time but their joy is cut short when they are told that Jane has been rushed to a hospice.

The couple visit and Hayley is shocked to see how dazed Jane is after taking morphine. Hayley and Roy then sit down as talk about Hayley's final days, where she tells Roy that she intends to end her own life when the cancer spreads. This causes an argument and Hayley moves in with Fiz and Tyrone. The following day, Hayley collapses and Fiz calls an ambulance to take Hayley to hospital. Roy and Fiz go too. At the hospital, the consultant explains that Hayley has an infection and needs to stay overnight. While Hayley is recovering, Roy accidentally tells Anna about her suicide wish. When she comes home, she is stunned to find Roy, Owen Armstrong (Ian Puleston-Davies) and Gary Windass (Mikey North) re-decorating their bedroom. Hayley secretly does not like the new wallpaper but keeps quiet so she does not upset Roy. Hayley insists on visiting Jane in the hospice and Jeff reveals that Jane has died. Hayley is devastated and furious with Roy. The pair argue again about the way Hayley wants to die. A few days later, Roy and Hayley attend Jane's funeral and meet her young sons, Zac and Henry. Hayley tries to comfort Henry as he is not coping. After the funeral, Roy tells Hayley that he thinks he can accept her suicide plot. Hayley is delighted but Roy tells Anna that he lied and feels he has betrayed her. Roy decides not to tell Hayley his true feelings and they listen to music together after a stressful day. Hayley later breaks down in Roy's arms, saying that she does not want to die and does not want to leave him. Hayley is delighted when asked by Carla to make her wedding dress. The dress is a success and Roy and Hayley attend Carla and Peter's wedding. While there, Christian returns to the street and winds Fiz up about Hayley so she tells him that Hayley has cancer in an angry outburst. On getting home, Hayley is stunned to see Christian and tells him that she is too tired but will see him another time. The following day, Christian visits again and Hayley is astonished when Christian says she can see the children. Hayley is thrilled but Christian demands Hayley give him money in return as he is in a lot of debt. Christian brings Sam and Maisie to the café and Maisie is intrigued by Roy's train collection, while Hayley and Christian talk upstairs. Hayley is shocked when Christian turns violent and starts pushing her for the money. She subsequently writes him a cheque. Maisie, however, tells her that she hopes she gets better soon and that she would love to come again. Fiz takes Hayley and Roy to The Rovers and Hayley tells them that she gave Christian the money. In December, Roy and Hayley go to a hospital appointment where she tells the nurse that her pain is getting worse and she is prescribed with stronger painkillers.

Hayley and Roy enjoy their last Christmas together. They buy each other gifts and want to be alone, but the day is interrupted by visits from friends and neighbours. Hayley enjoys their company, but after Fiz and Tyrone arrive with their young children, Hayley finds herself falling asleep. After a nap, Hayley is determined to go to The Rovers for a Christmas drink, but Roy wants her to take it easy. Later that week, Roy and Hayley go to a hospital appointment following her scan and learn that the cancer is a lot more aggressive than anticipated, meaning Hayley only has weeks left to live. Hayley takes her frustration out on the Christmas tree, wrecking Hope's decoration. The following day, Hayley tells Roy to let a few people know that she only has weeks left but does not want visitors. Roy breaks the news to Anna, Fiz, Tyrone, Peter, Carla, Rita Tanner (Barbara Knox) and Dennis Tanner (Philip Lowrie). Carla is determined to visit Hayley and she is glad that Carla came. She confides in her, telling her that she is frightened of dying. When Carla returns home, she breaks down after seeing Hayley in such a state. In her final week, Tyrone takes Hayley to the salon for a makeover although Roy wanted her to stay at home and rest. On 20 January 2014, she tells Roy she wants to die that day and whilst Roy is in The Kabin, Hayley irons his best shirt for her funeral. Norris Cole (Malcolm Hebden) notices that Roy is even more unhappy than usual, and asks if he is alright, but he claims to be fine. Roy arrives back at the café and is confronted by Gloria Price (Sue Johnston) with "customer feedback". Hayley begins to write letters for Tyrone and Fiz's children, but stops when she realises Hope and Ruby will not remember her, as they are too young. Roy tries one last time to stop Hayley but she is adamant. Roy makes sure that she is comfortable and selects a piece of music that they both like. Hayley tells Roy that he must not touch the glass containing the lethal cocktail. Prepared to drink the cocktail, Hayley is interrupted by Tyrone who is looking for Ruby's toy. Roy plays "The Lark Ascending" by Vaughan Williams, and sits on the bed with Hayley. After one last moment together, she drinks the cocktail. Worried something is not right, Anna closes the café and sits downstairs and Carla knocks on the door, demanding to see Hayley. Anna lets her in and tries to stop Carla knocking on the flat door, but she does. There is no answer, so Anna eventually unlocks the door with her spare key and they enter the flat together. Calling out, Anna and Carla go to the bedroom and, to their shock, find a deceased Hayley on the bed, with Roy's arm around her. Hayley is later cremated following a humanist funeral.

== Reception ==
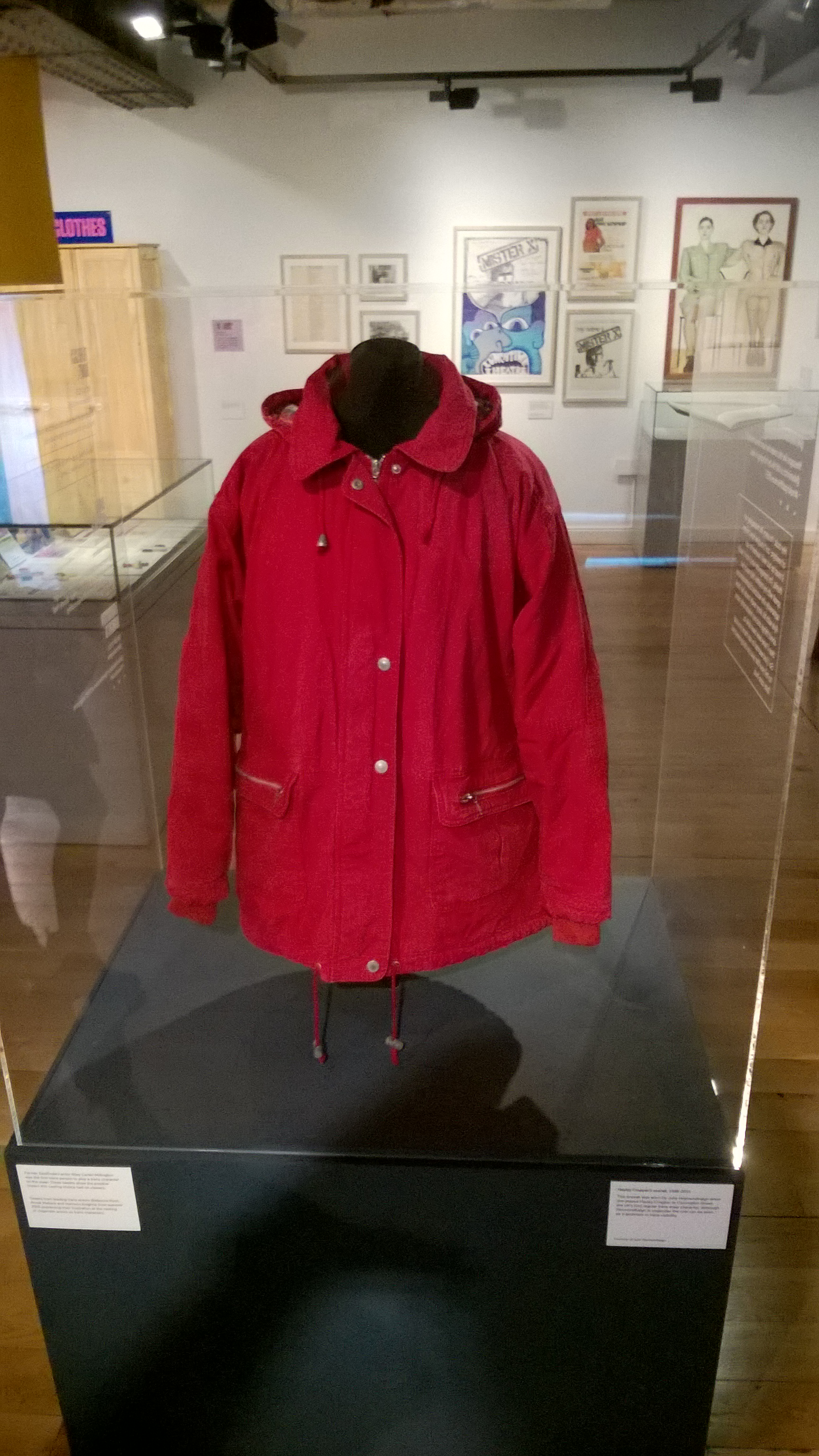
Hayley's trademark red anorak, in the People's History Museum in Manchester

For her portrayal of Hayley, Hesmondhalgh was nominated in the category of "Most Popular Actress" at the 1999 National Television Awards. The appearance of a transgender woman in a mainstream soap opera attracted initial opposition from some members of the public, as expressed in calls to the Granada duty office, and letters written to magazines and newspapers. A minority of people expressed their concern at having such "bizarreness" brought into their homes on a prime-time show. Transgender groups were also largely unhappy with the storyline, and found Hayley's original character traits, as badly written, clichéd and ill-informed. Press for Change, the transgender campaign and information group, were particularly concerned with the direction of the storyline, but after the first two months a trans advisor connected to Press for Change, Annie Wallace, was regularly consulted for eighteen months by scriptwriters and the actor, and trans groups appeared happier with the stories and scripts that resulted from this liaison. In an interview with Hesmondhalgh in August 2015, it was revealed that in tribute to Wallace, the writers gave Hayley's middle name as Anne, and gave her the same birthday, as well as a mutual love for rock music, especially Queen. Wallace is now an actress in her own right, and appears as the character Sally St. Claire in the Channel 4 soap opera, Hollyoaks.

Transgender campaigners were initially upset that a cisgender woman had been chosen for the part but later praised Hesmondhalgh's dedication and sensitivity. Hayley was, for many viewers, the first transgender woman whose story they had seen unfold on TV. Hesmondhalgh has become an outspoken activist for trans rights, including becoming the first Friend of campaign group Trans Media Watch and as Hayley, she has heralded a new level of acceptance among people across the country. The official LGBT History Month website includes Hayley as one of the important famous LGBT people in their history, even though she is a fictional character.

In 2008, All About Soap included Hayley's transgender plot in their list of "top ten taboo" storylines of all time. Their writer described it as one of the "taboos which have bravely been broken by soaps."

On 22 January 2014, Hesmondhalgh won "Best Serial Drama Performance" at the National Television Awards. Also in 2014, Hesmondhalgh was nominated for the "Best Actress" award at The British Soap Awards. As well as being nominated for the "Best Actress" award, Hesmondhalgh's final appearance, entitled "Hayley's Death", was nominated for the "Best Single Episode" award, as well. Hesmondhalgh won both of these awards. Hesmondhalgh also won "Best On-screen partnership" and "Best Storyline" – both alongside David Neilson – at the ceremony.

=== Political impact ===
Coronation Street's handling of transgender issues, the uncertainty of whether her partner would accept her gender identity and the inability of transgender people to adopt children or marry, has been praised by transgender groups. An Early Day Motion was also tabled in Parliament by Lynne Jones, MP, praising the story team and researchers, and Julie Hesmondhalgh for her portrayal.

Following the screening of the "wedding" in 1999, the Labour Government announced that a Parliamentary Working Group was being created to assess how the United Kingdom could grant trans people the legal rights for which they had fought for decades. The result of this was the tabling, in 2004, of the Gender Recognition Act, granting trans people full legal status in their acquired sex. It has been said that the character of Hayley deserves partial credit for bringing the issues faced by trans people to public attention in a sympathetic manner, rather than the sensationalist coverage that had previously existed.. It is also alleged that the resultant public support for this fictional character went in favour of the Bill.
