= Amy Barlow =

Fictional character from Coronation Street

- Coronation Street character
- Elle Mulvaney as Amy Barlow (2015)
- Portrayed by: Holly Bowyer (2004); Rebecca Pike (2004–2005); Amber Chadwick (2004, 2006–2010); Louisa Morris (2005); Rachel and Sarah Corker (2005); Madison Hampson (2005–2006); Elle Mulvaney (2010–present)
- Duration: 2004–present
- First appearance: 9 February 2004
- Introduced by: Kieran Roberts
- Spin-off appearances: Coronation Street: Text Santa Special (2015)
In-universe information
- Other names: Patience Cropper; Amy McDonald
- Father: Steve McDonald
- Mother: Tracy Barlow
- Stepmother: Karen McDonald; Becky McDonald; Michelle Connor
- Half-brothers: Ruairi McDonald; Oliver Battersby
- Half-sisters: Emma Brooker
- Grandfathers: Jim McDonald; Ray Langton; Ken Barlow (adoptive)
- Grandmothers: Liz McDonald; Deirdre Barlow
- Uncles: Andy McDonald; Lawrence Cunningham (adoptive); Peter Barlow (adoptive); Daniel Osbourne (adoptive); Ben Driscoll
- First cousins: James Cunningham (adoptive); Adam Barlow (adoptive); Simon Barlow (adoptive); Bertie Osbourne (adoptive); Ollie Driscoll; Will Driscoll
- Other relatives: Blanche Hunt

Amy Barlow (also McDonald, also known as Patience Cropper) is a fictional character from the British ITV soap opera Coronation Street, portrayed by Elle Mulvaney. She was born on screen during the episode broadcast on 9 February 2004. To date, the character has been portrayed by eight child actors; Holly Bowyer, Rebecca Pike, Louisa Morris, Rachel and Sarah Corker, Madison Hampson, Amber Chadwick and Elle Mulvaney.

Amy is the daughter of established characters Tracy Barlow (Kate Ford) and Steve McDonald (Simon Gregson), granddaughter of Deirdre Barlow (Anne Kirkbride), Ray Langton (Neville Buswell), Ken Barlow (William Roache), Liz McDonald (Beverley Callard) and Jim McDonald (Charles Lawson) and the cousin of Simon Barlow (Alex Bain) and Adam Barlow (Iain De Caestecker; Sam Robertson). Amy's storylines have included: her mother's selling her to Roy Cropper (David Neilson), who was presumed to be the father of Amy, and his wife, Hayley (Julie Hesmondhalgh); her becoming lactose intolerant and purposefully making herself ill so that her parents would be nice to each other; her losing her great-grandmother Blanche Hunt (Maggie Jones) and grandmother Deirdre; Amy being stuck in Victoria Court flats when a fire was accidentally started by Tracy, Amy falling pregnant at the age of 14 by gang leader Tyler Jefferies (Will Barnett), and having a secret abortion without telling her parents. Later storylines involve a relationship with Jacob Hay (Jack James Ryan).

== Casting ==
Holly Bowyer and Rebecca Pike shared the role of newborn Amy Barlow in February 2004 for a month until Bowyer left. Pike continued in the role until July 2005 when she was replaced with Louisa Morris. Morris departed two months later and the role was briefly taken over by twins Rachel and Sarah Corker for two episodes in September. Amy was once again recast later that month with Madison Hampson.

Hampson quit Coronation Street in early 2006. Amber Chadwick was cast as Amy Barlow when Hampson departed with Chadwick first appearing onscreen in March 2006.

Chadwick played the role until 2010 when the decision was made to recast Amy to tie in with the return of her onscreen mother Tracy. The casting of seven-year-old Elle Mulvaney was announced in March 2010. A spokeswoman said "Amy has some big storylines coming up so we decided to recast an older child who could play younger. This is common practice. For example, Alex Bain is two years older than Simon is on screen." Mulvaney first appeared onscreen in May 2010.

== Development ==
=== Early development ===
In April 2011, Tracy was accused of poisoning Amy: when Amy came down with a mysterious illness, Becky blamed Tracy. A source said "Becky loves Amy and can't bear to see her suffering. She also can't bear seeing Steve and Tracy together. She is jealous and she quickly realises that Tracy is feeding off the attention Steve is giving them both. Becky can handle herself but Tracy is a dangerous enemy to make," the insider added. "If Steve believes Tracy over Becky, it could signal the end of their marriage." In May 2011, Amy was diagnosed as being Lactose intolerant and Tracy found out that Amy had been drinking milk to make herself ill in order to make her parents nicer. Kate Ford said of Amy's actions "[Tracy] catches Amy taking milk from the fridge. Amy drops the milk and locks herself in the front room and Tracy calls Steve round to coax her out. Amy tells them she's been making herself ill because then Steve comes round and her parents are nicer to each other...both she and Steve feel very guilty. They haven't behaved well and at times have forgotten that there's a child involved."

In November 2015, it was announced that Simon would lash out at Amy at Christmas as part of Simon's domestic abuse plot, where he had been attacking his stepmother, Leanne Battersby (Jane Danson). A source said that "The Barlows are going to be central to Coronation Street in the run up to Christmas. The close-knit family will be put under extreme strain and viewers will be left wondering if they can get through the turmoil."

=== Teenage pregnancy ===
Coronation Street executive producer Iain MacLeod revealed that there are “great things coming up at Christmas" for "the unlikely character" Amy; speculation arose Amy could kill Tracy due to recent storylines and Amy's "menacing nature in the past." In November 2018, it was reported that Amy would fall pregnant in a "dramatic" and "scandal[ous]" storyline that leaves Tracy and Steve in "turmoil" as they "hit the roof" and "lose their rag"; Amy's life will also be turned "upside down" as she seeks support from Liz. Duncan Lindsay from Metro said Amy's storylines "don't come much more major than this" as well as believing Mulvaney "will be at the centre of some highly dramatic scenes." Lindsay also added that similarities will be drawn between Amy's teenage pregnancy and that of Sarah Platt's (Tina O'Brien) from 2000.

== Storylines ==
In August 2003, after a one-night stand with Steve McDonald (Simon Gregson), Tracy Barlow (Kate Ford) falls pregnant. However, Tracy drugs the much older Roy Cropper (David Neilson) and pretends that she has had sex with him, leading him to believe he is the father. Tracy offers to sell her baby to Roy and his wife, Hayley Cropper (Julie Hesmondhalgh), and they accept. Roy marries Tracy to ensure he would be named the baby's carer. Tracy gives birth to a daughter in February 2004 and she is called Patience by Roy and Hayley. Tracy later changes her mind and demands her daughter back during Steve's wedding, admitting that he is the father. Roy and Hayley hand her back and Tracy renames her Amy. Steve's wife, Karen McDonald (Suranne Jones), resents Amy's presence, even causing a fight at her christening. In December 2004, Karen later steals Tracy's car, unaware Amy is in the back. She burns the car, making Tracy believe that Amy is still in it when she is actually safe.

In January 2007, Tracy murders Charlie Stubbs (Bill Ward) and is subsequently imprisoned. Amy moves in with Steve and his mother Liz McDonald (Beverley Callard) at The Rovers Return Inn. As a toddler, Amy is almost knocked down by Harry Mason (Jack Ellis) while she is meant to be looked after by Darryl Morton (Jonathan Dixon).

In August 2009, Steve marries Becky Granger (Katherine Kelly), who cares for Amy as if she was her own daughter. In May 2010, when Amy is bullied about Tracy, Becky tells her about Tracy being in prison and they later visit her. Tracy's grandmother Blanche Hunt (Maggie Jones) dies in the same month. Becky looks after a confused and upset six-year-old Amy and she ties a picture to a balloon for Blanche. Tracy attends Blanche's funeral and is reunited with Amy, who is initially frightened of her. On Christmas Day 2010, Amy is upset further when Tracy attacks Becky. Tracy is freed and visits Amy, who tells her about Steve and Becky buying Max Turner (Harry McDermott). Amy moves in with Tracy at the Barlow house. In early 2011, Amy goes to Blackpool with Steve and Tracy. When she becomes fed up with them arguing, she runs off. Amy is eventually found and the family spend the night in Blackpool, after Steve's car is towed away. Amy is diagnosed with a dairy allergy after she ends up in hospital. Amy deliberately starts making herself ill, so Steve will come and look after her with Tracy. Tracy and Steve are mortified when Amy admits she has been drinking milk on purpose in a bid for more attention. In the summer of 2011, Steve leaves Amy with Tracy's adoptive nephew James Cunningham (James Roache), when he has a work problem to deal with. James asks Amy to go upstairs, but she overhears his conversation with a surveyor. James threatens to put Tracy in prison if Amy tells anyone. A few days later, Amy tells Tracy and James insists she is making the story up. Tracy and Amy then leave for London for a few weeks.

On their return in August 2011, Tracy announces she is pregnant and she and Steve start a proper relationship. Amy is excited to have two new siblings and Steve and Tracy back together. In December 2011, Amy acts in the local nativity play and she asks to visit Becky, following a fire at her flat on Christmas Day 2011. In January 2012, Amy is a bridesmaid at Tracy and Steve's wedding, but Steve and Tracy split up shortly afterwards. Steve divides the house in two, with Amy living upstairs with Tracy. When Steve cuts the electricity, Tracy asks her parents Ken (William Roache) and Deirdre Barlow (Anne Kirkbride) to look after Amy. Steve later removes the partition and moves out, leaving Amy and Tracy to live with Beth Tinker (Lisa George) and her son, Craig Tinker (Colson Smith). Lesley Kershaw (Judy Holt) takes Amy to the park. Steve catches up with them and brings Amy home to a worried Tracy. In June 2012, Amy notices her pocket money has gone missing from her piggy bank, but Tracy does not believe her. It later transpires that Amy's adoptive cousin Simon Barlow (Alex Bain) stole it along with Aadi Alahan's (Zennon Ditchett) game console. Tracy and Amy are left homeless when Steve decides to sell number 13, but they eventually move in with Emily Bishop (Eileen Derbyshire) and Norris Cole (Malcolm Hebden). However, they are kicked out again when Tracy ruins Norris' shoes unaware that they were actually Emily's late husband Ernest Bishop's (Stephen Hancock). Ken refuses to take Tracy in however makes Amy as an exception, but Tracy refuses to separate from Amy. Tracy complains of stomach pains but everyone refuses to believe her knowing her manipulative personality. However Ken, Deirdre and Amy later find her on the floor collapsed and is rushed to hospital. Tracy tells Amy that she and Steve are reuniting, but witnesses Steve kissing his ex-girlfriend Michelle Connor (Kym Marsh). Upset and confused, she tells Deirdre. Amy eventually bonds with Michelle and accepts her and Steve's relationship. When Tracy begins a relationship with Rob Donovan (Marc Baylis), she starts bunking off to stay at his flat. Ken and Deirdre accuse Tracy of neglect and Amy goes to live with Steve, Michelle and Michelle's adoptive son Ryan Connor (Sol Heras) in their small 2 bedroom flat and Amy has to sleep on a sofa bed in the lounge. However, when Stella Price (Michelle Collins) puts The Rovers up for sale, Steve buys it back from her and Ryan goes to live in Ibiza. Liz returns as landlady of The Rovers and she also lives there. Amy stays with Ken, Deirdre and Tracy twice a week, but Tracy usually stays at Rob's flat for the rest of the time.

By the time Amy turns 10, it is clear that she has inherited troublemaking traits from her mother. This starts when Amy taunts Simon when his father, Peter Barlow (Chris Gascoyne), is sent to prison for the murder of Tina McIntyre (Michelle Keegan). Whilst being looked after by Sophie Webster (Brooke Vincent) and her girlfriend, Maddie Heath (Amy James-Kelly), Amy becomes jealous of the amount of attention that Simon is getting. After Maddie berates Amy for bullying Simon, Amy sneaks off to see Tracy and lies that Maddie has threatened to hit her. A week later, Simon and Amy are once again looked after by Maddie and Sophie and again, Amy is jealous of the attention that Maddie shows to Simon. When they stop at The Kabin to get some sweets, Amy deliberately lets Deirdre's dog, Eccles, off her lead, knowing that the dog going missing would greatly upset Simon. Later, Sophie and Maddie find the dog and return her home to a relieved Deirdre and Simon. In September 2014, Amy causes more trouble when she cuts her hand on the back door and lies that the dog has bitten her. Tracy is furious and insists that the dog must be put down. Simon is devastated and tells Sophie and Maddie about what has happened. Maddie and a reluctant Sophie agree to try to help and they take the dog and hide her in No. 4. The Barlows begin searching for the dog and a couple of days later, Ken spots Sophie and Maddie taking her for a walk. Ken brings the dog home and Tracy again insists that the dog has to go. Ken tries to get Amy to tell the truth about her injury and she eventually reveals that she lied about the dog biting her. Maddie praises Amy for admitting the truth, telling her that she was very brave.

In May 2015, Amy, along with Carla Connor (Alison King), becomes trapped in a fire in the Victoria Court flats after it was accidentally started by Tracy. Carla is rescued while Leanne and her partner, Kal Nazir (Jimi Mistry) enter the flat to save Amy, but Kal, Leanne and Amy all become trapped when the roof caves in, blocking the door. Luckily, the fire brigade arrive and manage to get Leanne and Amy out of the flat, but an explosion happens, killing Kal. However, Amy does not seem to take Kal's death seriously and feels happier that she was rescued from the fire. In July 2015, Amy is upset to learn that Deirdre died just before she was due to return to Weatherfield. Simon and Amy are both left money by Deirdre in her will. In September 2015, Amy starts at Weatherfield High School and she also decides to take up violin lessons. In November 2015, Simon moves in with the Barlows because he has been physically abusing his adoptive mother, Leanne Battersby (Jane Danson). Amy annoys Simon with her violin, he tries to take the violin from Amy, however Ken catches them arguing and they come up with a solution. Simon and Amy are left alone at the Barlow house and Simon ends up hurting Amy. Amy tells Ken and Tracy, who contact Leanne, who is encouraged by her half-sister Eva Price (Catherine Tyldesley) to admit Simon has been hurting her. Leanne has to take Simon home and the family agree to get Simon help.

At Carla and Nick Tilsley's (Ben Price) wedding in May 2016, Tracy reveals Carla's lies to everyone and following her boyfriend Robert Preston (Tristan Gemmill) splitting from Tracy, Amy decides to move in with Steve and Michelle. Amy refuses to move back in with Tracy as Amy herself blames and disowns her mother for ruining Nick's and Carla's wedding, despite persuasion from Steve and Michelle. When Amy meets Michelle's ex-boyfriend Will Chatterton (Leon Ockenden) and overhears a conversation between Michelle and Sean Tully (Antony Cotton), she realises Michelle and Will had a fling and blackmails Michelle into allowing her to stay. Amy bans Tracy from her violin recital, but Tracy turns up and it puts Amy off. Tracy is taken to hospital when she collapses due to her kidney and Amy refuses to see her. Tracy is soon discharged. At Simon's birthday tea in July 2016, Amy is annoyed with Tracy when she turns up with gifts for her. On the anniversary of Deirdre's death, Amy overhears Ken and Rita tell funny stories about Deirdre. Amy believes it is rude, but Robert explains they were remembering her and they go to the cemetery to support Tracy. Amy insists nothing has changed between them, but Steve and Ken persuade Amy to move back in with Tracy. Simon confides in Amy about his fears that Leanne has cancer and Amy tries to reassure him, but he finds a message on Leanne's phone confirming a doctor's appointment.

In September 2016, Liz lets slip that Michelle is pregnant after Amy complains about Michelle snapping at her and Amy is delighted. In October 2016, Amy finds Michelle is researching abortion clinics and Michelle explains to her the baby may be ill, but Amy refuses to accept it. Amy and Michelle make amends and Michelle decides not to have an abortion. In January 2017, Michelle suffers a late miscarriage and her and Steve's son, Ruairi McDonald, dies at birth. In February 2017, when Amy returns from a school trip, Steve tells her that he and Michelle have split up as Leanne's son, Oliver Battersby, is his son. In March 2017, Tracy and Amy believe Ken does not love them as much compared to the Barlow family. Amy smashes a violin from a skip, pretending it is hers, and gets the money from Ken for a replacement, but she later calls someone and leaves the money for the violin at the house. When Ken is found unconscious at the bottom of the stairs (see Who Attacked Ken?), the police believe that he was pushed and the family are all suspects and Amy secretly has been in contact with Ken's grandson, Adam Barlow (Sam Robertson), who was supposedly in Canada. In April 2017, when Adam suspects Tracy attacked Ken, he tries to get information from Amy, but she refuses to say anything against Tracy and Amy phones the police, telling them that Adam's alibi was false. When Adam is arrested, Amy admits to Tracy that she phoned the police. Amy is question by DS MacKinnon (Sandra Huggett) when Adam tells DS MacKinnon about the money, but Amy denies it. In May 2017, Tracy confides in Rob, who escapes from prison whilst being transferred, about her fears that Amy was responsible for Ken's attack. Tracy goes on the run with Amy to the Peak District along with Rob, although Amy is unaware he is with them and Tracy fails to tell Amy that Rob is with them. The Barlows and the McDonalds find Tracy's and Amy's phones still at home and Amy's passport missing and they report Tracy and Amy's disappearance to DS MacKinnon. Steve and Ken are told by the police about Rob's disappearance and that Tracy and Amy could be involved and choose to just report Tracy and Amy's disappearance in the news. Amy phones Steve, which the police use to find their whereabouts and when she returns, she finds Tracy and Rob kissing. They explain how Rob escaped and Amy tells them about phoning Steve. When the police arrive, Rob takes Amy back to Weatherfield and Tracy tells the police she attacked Ken. Amy finds out from Rob that Tracy confessed to the police, covering for her, but Amy denies hurting Ken and when Tracy is in court, Rob bursts in and tells Tracy that Amy is innocent.

When Todd Grimshaw (Bruno Langley) and his boyfriend Billy Mayhew (Daniel Brocklebank) become guardians of Billy's goddaughter, Summer Spellman (Matilda Freeman), Tracy brings Amy to meet Summer. Amy and Summer do not interact and, in Billy and Todd's absence, they argue and Amy accuses Summer of hitting her. When Amy and Summer have their hair done for school and are not allowed highlights, Summer uses bleach and other products to do so for Amy and Asha Alahan (Tanisha Gorey). Amy's hair turns orange and Todd, Amy and Summer lie to Tracy that Amy wants a sleepover with Summer for a chance to fix it, but Tracy finds out about the hair. In September 2017, Amy and Asha put blue paint on the window wipers of Roy's car, angering Cathy Matthews (Melanie Hill) and Brian Packham (Peter Gunn), who make Amy and Asha put on a Boney M tribute act for their punishment. Wanting to be friends with Amy and Asha, Summer uses shaving foam to draw an inappropriate image on a teacher's car, but is caught, which results in Billy and Todd being called in. Simon attempts to force Summer to smoke cigarettes he found, but Summer takes them for herself and smokes them when she is emotional. Summer is found unconscious by Simon and Amy and is taken to hospital, where it turns out she smoked spice and Billy and Todd make amends. Peter and his partner, Toyah Battersby (Georgia Taylor), find out from Simon, Amy, Aadi and Asha that Simon had the cigarette. Amy is not happy when Steve and Tracy get back together. After lying about her whereabouts, Steve and Tracy turn up at one of Amy's friends party, where Amy is caught kissing a boy. Amy helps Summer to look for Billy, but are put in danger when a homeless man tricks them into finding out his whereabouts, but Peter gets them away.

By the age of 14 years old, Amy discovers she is pregnant. When she tells her parents, Steve reacts negatively and accuses Aadi and Simon of impregnating her. Tracy demands Amy to reveal the identity of her baby's father, but Amy claims she does not know who he is as she had met him at a Christmas party and that it was her first time having sex. Amy considers having an abortion but changes her mind shortly after talking to teenage mother Faye Windass (Ellie Leach). Amy then later meets with Simon's enemy Tyler Jefferies (Will Barnett) to discuss their one night stand and her pregnancy, revealing him to be the father. Upon realising Amy is underage, Tyler rejects Amy and threatens her to have an abortion. Tracy and Steve later learn the truth of the paternity and tells Amy that they have decided to adopt her baby and raise it as their own child. When Tyler firmly tells Amy that he does not want to be a father and overwhelmed with Tracy and Steve's excitement of adopting the baby, Amy secretly has an abortion with Bethany Platt (Lucy Fallon) by her side at the clinic. Tracy learns of Amy's secret and admits to the realisation that she has neglected Amy's emotional feelings over the baby.

In 2022, Amy begins to date drug dealer Jacob Hay (Jack James Ryan) behind the back of her parents and her friends. Her friends eventually find out after Amy defends Jacob when Steve and Tracy find him in their house, thinking he is robbing them.

== Reception ==
During the May 2015 episodes, which saw a fire started by Tracy at the Victoria Court flats, Amy was one of the characters trapped in the fire. Duncan Lindsay for the Metro said of Amy's performance in these episodes "The performances from Corrie acting titans such as Kate Ford [Tracy], Alison King [Carla] and Jane Danson [Leanne] always add to the drama, and young Elle Mulvaney, who plays Amy, is surely now a contender for next year's Young Performance prize at the British Soap Awards." For her portrayal as Amy, Mulvaney has been longlisted 3 times in 2010, 2011 and 2012 at the Inside Soap Awards for Best Young Actor. Mulvaney won the Best Young Actor award at The British Soap Awards 2017. In August 2017, Mulvaney was longlisted for Best Young Actor at the Inside Soap Awards. She did not progress to the viewer-voted shortlist.

== See also ==
- List of Coronation Street characters (2004)
- List of soap opera villains
