= Liz McDonald =

Fictional character from Coronation Street

- Coronation Street character
- Portrayed by: Beverley Callard
- Duration: 1989–1998, 2000–2001, 2003–2011, 2013–2020
- First appearance: Episode 2984; 27 October 1989
- Last appearance: Episode 10076; 17 June 2020
- Introduced by: Mervyn Watson (1989); Jane MacNaught (2000); Kieran Roberts (2003); Stuart Blackburn (2013)
- Crossover appearances: East Street (2010); The Queen Vic Quiz Night (2020)
In-universe information
- Occupation: Pub landlady; Businesswoman; Receptionist; Barmaid
- Father: George Greenwood
- Mother: Nancy Greenwood
- Husband: Jim McDonald (1974–1997, 2000–2005); Vernon Tomlin (2007–2009)
- Sons: Steve McDonald; Andy McDonald
- Daughters: Katie McDonald
- Grandsons: Ruairi McDonald; Oliver Battersby
- Granddaughters: Emma Brooker; Amy Barlow

Liz McDonald (originally credited as MacDonald) is a fictional character from the British ITV soap opera Coronation Street. She is portrayed by Beverley Callard. She made her first appearance on 27 October 1989. Callard opted to leave the series, and Liz departed on 13 November 1998. Callard reprised the role for a short stint with Liz appearing between 6 October 2000 and 12 January 2001. Callard reprised the role for two separate stints between 19 November and 30 November 2003 and between 13 February and 22 March 2004. She returned on a permanent basis on 22 June 2004. Callard departed once again, with Liz's final appearance airing on 14 April 2011. Callard reprised the role once again on a permanent basis and Liz returned on 14 October 2013. Callard announced her departure in November 2019, with her final scene broadcast on 17 June 2020.

Liz's storylines have seen her embark on a series of failed romances, including twice marriages to Jim McDonald (Charles Lawson), which became abusive, and Vernon Tomlin (Ian Reddington). She has also had many feuds, notably with son Steve's (Simon Gregson) ex-wives Karen (Suranne Jones), Becky (Katherine Kelly) and twice wife Tracy Barlow (Kate Ford). Her other feuds include Teresa Bryant (Karen Henthorn), Jenny Bradley (Sally Ann Matthews), Pat Phelan (Connor McIntyre) and Peter Barlow (Chris Gascoyne). Liz's emotional affair with Johnny Connor (Richard Hawley) eventually leads to Johnny's wife, Jenny, hitting Liz with her car in a hit-and-run storyline over Christmas 2018. Callard has claimed Liz's unique fashion sense stems from Alec Gilroy (Roy Barraclough) telling her that she could "aerate the space under her chin a bit more" in an episode early on in Liz's time in Weatherfield.

== Creation and casting ==
Liz as she appeared in 1991

In 1989, Beverley Callard was cast in the show as matriarch of the new McDonald family, after having previously played the part of June Dewhurst in 1984. Liz first appeared in October 1989 with her husband, ex-army sergeant Jim McDonald (Charles Lawson), and their twin sons Steve (Simon Gregson) and Andy (Nicholas Cochrane). Liz and Jim were married very young when Liz got pregnant.

When asked in a 2010 interview with Daily Mirror what her favourite scenes were, Callard replied, "when Jim beat up Liz. I knew those scenes would have a huge impact. There were protests outside the studios and I had sacks of letters from battered wives. The scenes were so well written that one week viewers would have sympathy for Liz, the next Jim, then Liz. Opening those scripts gave me a buzz. And the viewing figures, 24 million, were massive."

== Development ==
=== Reintroduction (2003) ===
On 14 August 2003, BBC News reported that Callard, along with Julie Goodyear (portraying Bet Lynch) and Charles Lawson (portraying Jim McDonald) would be returning for episodes filmed in Blackpool with Callard and Lawson's return storyline being separate to Goodyear's storyline. A spokeswoman for the show said: "It's great news – they are all popular characters." Viewers would also see Liz meet former daughter-in-law Karen (Suranne Jones) for the first time. The pair have met before but only off-screen. The spokeswoman said: "It will be interesting to see how Karen and Liz get on – sparks are bound to fly." The storylines were woven into the usual four-weekly episodes rather than being dedicated special programmes. It was reported that Liz would reunite with her family in episodes set in Blackpool. Speaking of the storyline, a Coronation Street spokeswoman said: "Fans will be on the edge of their seats when the week-long Blackpool adventure reaches an extraordinary finale involving a dramatic sea rescue and a tragic death."

In December 2003, Callard revealed that she would be returning again for Liz's son Steve's (Simon Gregson) second wedding to Karen. Callard said to the News of the World: "I'm definitely coming back, I've just worked for four weeks and I had such a great time there's no way I can turn down a chance to come back". On 4 February 2004, it was reported alongside the return of Leanne Battersby (Jane Danson) that Liz would return later that year.

=== Relationship with Lloyd Mullaney ===
In November 2008, it was revealed that Liz would embark on a relationship with Lloyd Mullaney played by Craig Charles. Speaking of his reaction when he was told about the relationship, Charles revealed: "Bev's a friend of me and my wife's, so it's all quite comfortable really. We get on really well, too. The relationship just opens up the whole scenario of Lloyd going out with his best mate's mum – and Steve definitely doesn't like it!" Charles also revealed that Steve's reaction to the relationship is that he is not impressed.

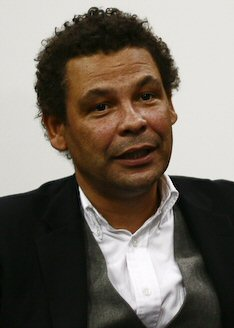
Liz had an on-and-off relationship with Lloyd Mullaney played by Craig Charles (pictured).

Liz and Lloyd's relationship was revisited in August 2015 when Lloyd sleeps with Liz in the wake of his split from Andrea Beckett (Hayley Tamaddon). Lloyd immediately regrets spending the night with Liz, but he is backed into a corner when she explains to a horrified Steve that they have a future together. Asked in an interview with Digital Spy if he would ever put Liz and Lloyd together, Charles replied: "Well they do have a history of course. On paper it is not the most obvious of matches but they do get on really well. This is probably not the best thing for either of them at the moment so it is no doubt doomed!" Charles later went on to reveal that Lloyd is the one who regrets it the most as he is very wry of upsetting both Liz and Steve. Lloyd and Liz are caught out the next morning by Steve and Michelle Connor (Kym Marsh). Asked how Steve react to the news that Lloyd has slept with his mum, Charles replied: "Steve is horrified but Liz insists to Steve they have done nothing wrong and that they have a future together. This was not what Lloyd was thinking but he now has to go along with it." Charles went on to say: "Steve is the person Lloyd is most worried about upsetting - they have only just got their friendship back on an even keel and now he is risking it again. But really he would be better being up front now, dragging it on is only going to make it worse in the end."

=== Departure (2011) ===
On 20 October 2010, it was announced that Liz was to leave. Discussing her departure, Callard said "I've loved every minute of my second stint on the street - it's always a difficult decision to make the leap but I returned for the 40th, so leaving for the 50th feels like perfect timing. I'll miss everyone on the show but I'm looking forward to some new challenges and to see what life has to offer beyond Liz's famous mini skirts!" Producer Phil Collinson commented: "Bev has created an iconic and much-loved character in Liz. She will be greatly missed behind the bar of The Rovers by the viewers of the show. She's a lovely lady and is such a talented actress. We all wish her well in whatever she does next and we hope to see the character of Liz return sometime in the future. Plans are now being made for an exciting exit storyline for her departure next year." In February 2011, it was announced that Lawson would be returning again to be a part of Liz's exit storyline. Speaking of the exit storyline, Callard said: "It's a fantastic exit and it's absolutely massive, but Liz may not be leaving on her own!"

Liz instead left after ex-husband Jim (Charles Lawson) staged an armed robbery at Weatherfield's building society; he does so as part of a desperate attempt to raise funds in order to buy The Rovers. His plan goes wrong, and Jim is expected to be jailed for ten years, leaving Liz heartbroken. She agrees to wait for him, but with little keeping her in Weatherfield, and after reminiscing on good and bad times, she decides to leaves the country without telling him or her family. She heads for the airport, with her last words being, "Go for it".

=== Reintroduction (2013) ===
On 30 May 2013, it was confirmed that Callard would be returning as Liz later that year; her return scenes aired in October 2013. Speaking of her return, Callard told itv.com: "I am coming home and I can't wait. I am so excited to be back, I have missed Liz so it will be great to play her again. Hopefully her skirts will have got a little bit longer, but we will see!"

In October 2013, Callard revealed that Liz would have a boyfriend in an upcoming plot, saying: "She [Liz] is telling everyone she's single, but there is someone coming in for Liz. My God, it's so exciting, but I can't reveal anything else yet." Tabloids reported that Liz's boyfriend would be portrayed by Jimi Mistry, but this was later proved to be false. It was later revealed that Liz would embark on a romance with Tony Stewart, portrayed by Terence Maynard in an upcoming storyline. Speaking of the plot, Maynard said; "It was always going to be the case that they'd get together, so I knew that from the start. What the writers weren't sure about was what would develop between Tony and Eileen and whether there'd be any tensions there. Liz and Tony are a bit of a double act and I think that could go further. I think at the moment Tony's really genuine with Liz – I don't think he's trying to deceive her in any way. I don't know who is 'the one' for Tony, but he's definitely happy with Liz!"

On 31 March 2016, it was reported that Callard would be taking a break from the serial due to her battle with depression; a show source confirmed, "She is taking some time off whilst her doctors look for a suitable alternative".

On 29 April 2016, it was confirmed that she would resume filming the following week, with Callard writing on Twitter, "Oh thank you so much for all your fab messages! I’m much better! Back to work next week!!! Hurray, watch out Weatherfield!! Xxx."

=== Departure (2020) ===
On 18 November 2019, it was announced that Callard had quit the soap. In an interview with OK! magazine, Callard revealed that she informed ITV bosses of her plans to leave earlier that month. Recalling the moment, she said: "I was in shock, I felt totally numb," adding: "I’ve been told Liz is going to go with one hell of a bang. I can't wait!" MD of Continuing Drama and Head of ITV in the North John Whiston said: “With the character of Liz, Beverley Callard has gifted to Coronation Street 30 years of brilliant drama, comedy and everything in between. Whether it’s sharing a wicked joke with Eileen, raising an arch eyebrow behind the bar of the Rovers or giving some feckless man the full force of her tongue, Liz is a true Coronation Street icon, and while we wish Bev well when she leaves to take on new challenges mid next year, hopefully Weatherfield hasn't seen the last of Liz!”

It was reported that Callard filmed her final scenes in July 2020, but it was later announced that due to the impact of the COVID-19 pandemic on television, Callard was unable to film her exit storyline, and her character was instead written out as having gone to Spain.

Speaking to the Daily Mirror, Callard commented "I'm due to film my final Corrie scenes in July and I have no idea what will happen. The only thing I've been guaranteed is that Liz is not going to die. It would be really good if she found love and happiness, but I can't see that happening. I'll miss the failed romances and the feuds, but not the fashion. On my last day I'll set fire to Liz's wardrobe."

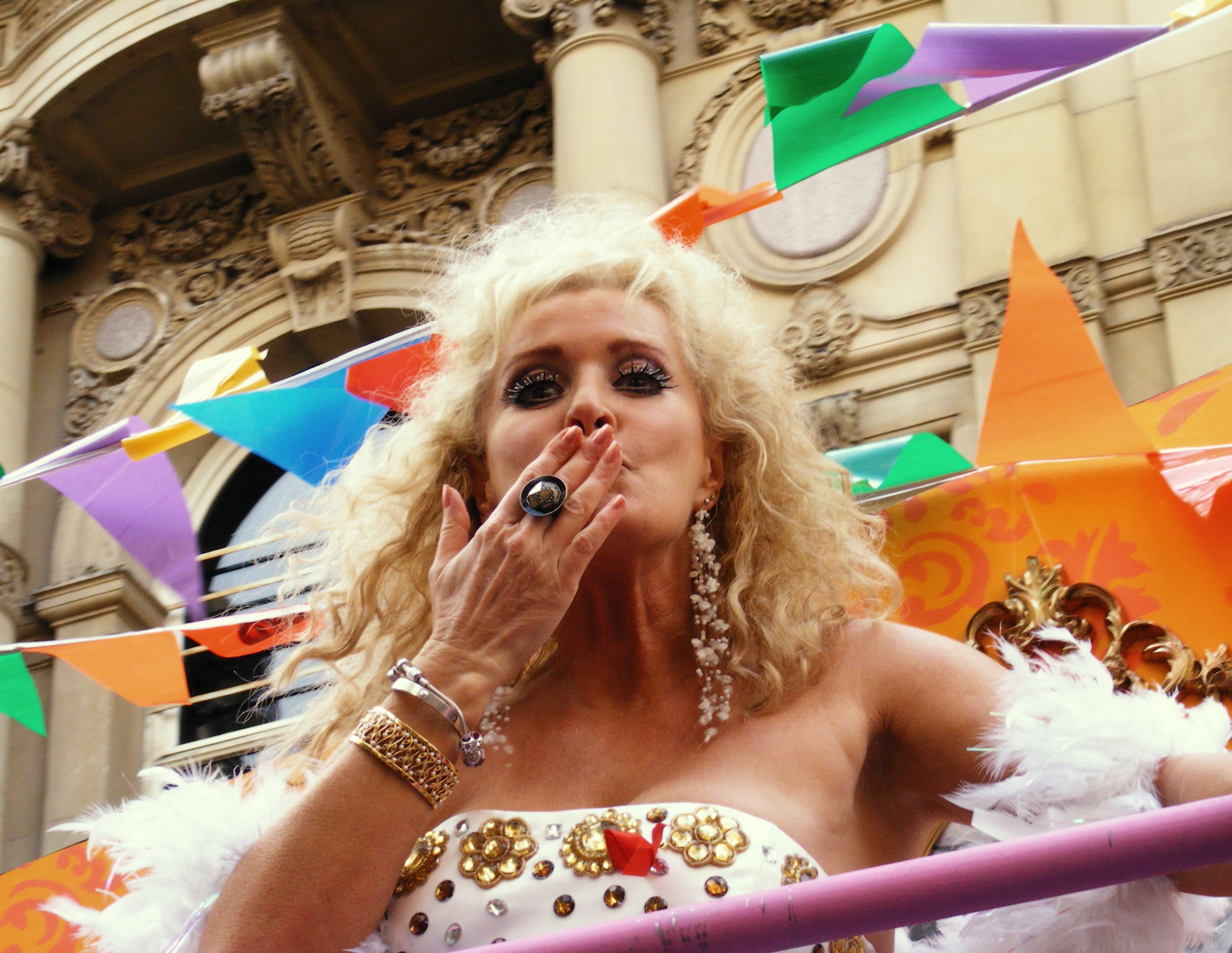
In 2021, Beverley Callard (pictured) ruled out a return to the soap.

On 30 August 2020, Callard announced that she would remain with the soap for another year, and would return sometime in 2021 to film Liz's exit storyline, after she underwent a routine hip operation which led to complications.

However, on 7 February 2021, she retracted her statement, and ruled out filming an exit storyline. Speaking of her decision, Callard said "I loved Coronation Street. I still do and I always will. But sometimes it's just not your turn on the merry-go-round. It was a massive decision for me to make, but I believe I did it for the right reasons. I felt Liz had run her course. I'd hate to cheat any fans out there who were waiting and hoping for something amazing to happen to her. I felt like she'd lost her way. I was actually toying with the idea of going back to film an exit, but I felt that they wouldn't be able to do Liz justice under the current Covid restrictions. I want to preserve her. Considering the current climate for actors, it's unsurprising that everyone told me to go back and take the money, but that's just not me. I have to earn my pay. The pandemic has given me time to assess how I feel about everything and I'm sure that my time on the cobbles is up."

== Storylines ==
=== 1989–1998 ===
Liz first appears on Coronation Street in October 1989 with her husband, former army sergeant Jim (Charles Lawson), and their two teenage sons, Steve (Simon Gregson) and Andy (Nicholas Cochrane). Liz makes friends with Deirdre Barlow (Anne Kirkbride), whose daughter Tracy (Dawn Acton) is slightly younger than Steve and Andy. Liz and Jim split up after Jim punches Steve during an argument, moving into the flat above the pub. Liz works as a barmaid at The Rovers Return Inn before being given her own pub, The Queens, to run. She moves into the flat above the pub and runs it with Jim, until he accuses her of cheating and causes a scene. Jim is then barred from the pub by the brewery. Liz and Jim split up and Liz runs the pub on her own. Shortly after, she begins a relationship with Colin Barnes (Ian Embleton), who is the brother of neighbour Des Barnes (Philip Middlemiss), but is not as invested in the relationship as he is. She later reconciles with Jim and they agree to work on their marriage but it doesn't last.

Liz, now separated, is working for Sean Skinner (Terence Hillyer) in the bookies. They flirt, but it is ended by a criminal called Fraser Henderson (Glyn Grain). He notices her when she visits Steve in prison and contacts her upon his release. He has Sean beaten but Liz gets involved with him regardless and he gives her a job in a wine bar he owns. Fiona Middleton's (Angela Griffin) fiancé, police detective Alan McKenna (Glen Hugill), persuades Liz to get some inside information on Fraser, who leaves town when he discovers this. His henchman captures Liz and holds her and her sons captive in Number 11, where Liz manages to use her stiletto on the thug and the police arrest him. In 1998, following a fight with Steve on a building site, Jim is badly injured after falling from scaffolding. He becomes temporarily paralysed, needing physiotherapy and Liz, taking pity on him, moves back in to help take care of him. They grow closer but Liz soon becomes distracted by Jim's physiotherapist, Michael Wall (Dominic Rickhards) and starts an affair with him. Jim, who gradually learns to walk again, is planning to propose but throws Liz out after catching her in bed with Michael, and the two agree to a divorce. Liz and Michael leave Weatherfield for a new life together in Milton Keynes.

=== 2000–2011 ===
Liz returns two years later when Jim is in prison for manslaughter after violently beating Jez Quigley (Lee Boardman) as revenge for Jez beating Steve. She is no longer with Michael. During this time, she and Jim reconcile and remarry in the prison chapel. Liz leaves the Street again, following Jim around as he is transferred from one prison to another, getting jobs nearby so that she can visit.

Liz returns in 2004 for her son Steve's second marriage to Karen McDonald (Suranne Jones). Liz meets Vernon Tomlin (Ian Reddington), a workshy drummer. He is very laid-back and totally unlike Jim, but they have fun and Liz feels like a teenager again. The pair split when Liz, tired of being taken for granted and his roving eye, throws him out. He returns, begging her to take him back and they get engaged.

When Jim is released, Liz is wary of allowing him into her life. However, impressed by how he has changed, they stay friends, but when Jim corners her on her wedding day, her initial fears are justified. He tells her he loves her and will not allow the marriage to take place, launching a violent attack when Vernon intervenes. Liz suppresses her doubts about marrying Vernon and, determined not to let Jim win, goes ahead. The couple go on honeymoon to Nashville. Vernon and Liz go to view a bar, possibly intending to buy it. Liz admits to Vernon that she would not be happy and no longer loves him, ending their marriage. A devastated Vernon moves out of the Rovers that day. Liz finds herself attracted to builder Owen Armstrong (Ian Puleston-Davies), who is new to the area and openly flirts with him across the bar. She is disgruntled when he takes Eileen Grimshaw (Sue Cleaver) on several dates, but tries to hide it. Eventually she and Owen begin dating. In early December 2010, Liz hears rumours that Owen arranged for her former husband Jim, to be beaten up. She packs her bags and heads for Andy's home in Spain, leaving Steve to reveal to Owen that the relationship is over.

Liz returns to discover that Steve and his wife Becky (Katherine Kelly) bought Becky's nephew Max Turner (Harry McDermott) for £20,000, from Becky's sister Kylie Turner (Paula Lane). She is further stunned when she learns that Becky looted from the corner shop on the night of the tram crash three months prior in order to give Kylie more cash. With the pub now under severe financial pressure due to Steve and Becky buying Max, Liz is devastated. She makes her contempt for Becky clear from the outset, who responds by kicking Liz out of the pub. A desperate Liz then bumps into Jim at a hotel she is staying at. She seeks his support as she tells him of the situation that Becky and Steve have gotten themselves into. He suggests that she buy the pub but the bank manager refuses to give Liz a loan. Jim then suggests that he could buy the pub for Liz, as Steve and Becky decide to leave Weatherfield with Max and Steve's daughter Amy Barlow (Elle Mulvaney). Liz makes her peace with the couple after they agree to the sale. Liz is now convinced that her dreams of owning The Rovers is going to come true and soon realises that she wants Jim to run it with her. The estranged couple soon reconcile. The date for the sale is set for 11 April 2011. Liz and Steve wait patiently at the Rovers with the solicitor, for Jim to come in with the money for the sale. Liz is astonished when the police suddenly arrive at the pub to tell her that Jim has been caught robbing a bank and now has a number of hostages. Over the phone, Liz and Jim (from inside the bank) speak; he explains that he never had the money but wanted to buy The Rovers to make her happy. A frightened Liz convinces Jim to let the hostages go, discard his firearm and surrender to the police officers waiting outside the building. The day after his arrest, Liz visits Jim in prison and promises to wait for him. However, later that evening she decides to leave without telling Steve and Becky. After they have gone to bed, she leaves the pub and gets a taxi to the airport and flies out to Spain to live with Andy.

=== 2013–2020 ===
Liz returns to the street again in October 2013. It transpires that both Steve and Liz have bought back The Rovers from the former landlady, Stella Price (Michelle Collins), owning 50% each. She reveals she has remained in Spain since she was last in Weatherfield where she owned a villa and a health spa business but sold the health spa to invest in the Rovers when she learnt it was once again up for sale. Liz is stunned when she walks into The Rovers and finds Kylie and Tina McIntyre (Michelle Keegan) sharing a catfight in front of the bar. Liz and Kylie's friend Eva Price (Catherine Tyldesley) attempt to step in, but Liz watches in horror as Kylie accidentally slaps Eva. After throwing both Kylie and Tina out of the pub, Liz discovers that Steve hasn't told his girlfriend Michelle Connor (Kym Marsh) that she is co-owner. She is further surprised to learn that Michelle is co-landlady. Following a confrontation with Steve, Michelle resumes her friendship with Liz. Liz begins dating Tony Stewart (Terence Maynard). Later on, Steve sees that Tony isn't the nice man he pretends to be and tries to warn Liz, but she refuses to believe her and continues her relationship with Tony. Steve is diagnosed with depression and him and Michelle break up, until she declares her love for him after he feels guilty when he crashes a bus. Michelle and Steve get engaged and they sell their share of the pub to an unknown company named Travis Limited. On Steve and Michelle's wedding day, however, Tracy (now portrayed by Kate Ford) tells her that she and Tony have been embarking on an affair and Travis Limited is actually Tony in a bid for them both to own the pub. Tony told Liz to sell the pub to move to Spain, but he was actually going to make her also sell her share to Travis Limited. Carla Connor (Alison King) decides to go instead, wrecking Tracy and Tony's plans and causing Tracy to plot revenge against Carla. In July 2015 Liz is saddened when she discovers that her best friend Deirdre died whilst staying with her friend Bev Unwin (Susie Blake).

In 2017, Steve has to sell his share of the Rovers as part of his divorce to Michelle, so Liz decides to also sell her share and leave her pub. Off-screen in 2020, Liz decides to leave Weatherfield to live with Andy in Spain.

== Reception ==
In a 2021 Radio Times poll, Liz was voted as the ninth best "soap pub landlord", receiving 3% of the votes. A writer from ITVX opined that Liz' ten top lovers were Jim McDonald (Charles Lawson), Tony Stewart (Terence Maynard), Vernon Tomlin (Ian Reddington), Lloyd Mullaney (Craig Charles), Fraser Henderson (Glyn Grain), Michael Wall (Dominic Rickhards), Derek (David Hounslow), Colin Barnes (Ian Embleton), Des Barnes (Philip Middlemiss) and Dan Jones (Andrew Paul), and wrote, "Liz has been unlucky in love more times than she'd care to mention".
