= Tracy Barlow =

Fictional character from Coronation Street

- Coronation Street character
- Kate Ford as Tracy Barlow (2011)
- Portrayed by: Christabel Finch (1977–1983); Holly Chamarette (1985–1988); Dawn Acton (1988–1999); Kate Ford (2002–present)
- Duration: 1977–1983, 1985–1997, 1999, 2002–2007, 2010–present
- First appearance: 24 January 1977
- Introduced by: Bill Podmore (1977); Mervyn Watson (1985); Brian Park (1996); Jane MacNaught (1999); Kieran Roberts (2002); Kim Crowther (2010); Phil Collinson (2010)
- Crossover appearances: Corriedale (2026)
- Dawn Acton as Tracy Barlow (1991)
In-universe information
- Other names: Tracy Langton; Tracy Preston; Tracy Cropper; Tracy McDonald; Tracy Lynette Barlow
- Occupation: Florist; Businesswoman; Pawnbroker
- Father: Ray Langton
- Mother: Deirdre Barlow
- Adoptive father: Ken Barlow
- Stepfather: Samir Rachid
- Half-brothers: Lawrence Cunningham (adoptive); Peter Barlow (adoptive); Daniel Osbourne (adoptive)
- Half-sisters: Susan Barlow (adoptive)
- Husband: Robert Preston (1996–2003); Roy Cropper (2003–2004); Steve McDonald (2012–2013, 2018–2026)
- Daughters: Amy Barlow
- Stepsons: Oliver Battersby
- Stepdaughters: Emma Brooker
- Grandfathers: Donald Hunt
- Grandmothers: Blanche Hunt
- Aunts: Janice Langton
- Nephews: Simon Barlow (adoptive); James Cunningham (adoptive); Adam Barlow (adoptive); Bertie Osbourne (adoptive)

Tracy Barlow (also Langton, Preston and McDonald) is a fictional character from the British ITV soap opera Coronation Street. She was born on-screen during the episode broadcast on 24 January 1977. She was played by Christabel Finch until 21 November 1983. Holly Chamarette played the role from 8 July 1985 until 23 March 1988. Dawn Acton played the role from 12 December 1988 to 10 July 1995. Acton reprised the role for two short stints in November 1996 and December 1997. She reprised the role once again on 14 March 1999 and made her final appearance as Tracy on 10 October 1999. Kate Ford took over the role from 25 December 2002 to 8 April 2007. Ford reprised the role for a brief stint from late May to early June 2010, returning full-time from 24 December 2010. In April 2024, Ford took a break from the show and returned on 16 August 2024.

Tracy is the daughter of Ray Langton (Neville Buswell) and Deirdre Barlow (Anne Kirkbride). Tracy never had much to do with Ray and was later adopted by Deirdre's new husband Ken Barlow (William Roache). Early storylines featuring Tracy concentrated on her childhood. She went on to feature in storylines about drugs, various family crises, relationships with Roy Cropper (David Neilson) and Steve McDonald (Simon Gregson), a feud with Steve's ex-wife Karen McDonald (Suranne Jones) and a short-lived marriage to Robert Preston (Julian Kay). Her exit storyline in 2007 was the culmination of a storyline that saw Tracy imprisoned for killing her boyfriend Charlie Stubbs (Bill Ward) in revenge. In the on-screen events, Tracy was sentenced to 15 years in prison. Her brief return in May 2010 saw the character lie about Gail Platt (Helen Worth) confessing to murdering late husband Joe McIntyre (Reece Dinsdale). Her return in December 2010 saw her released from prison after forensic evidence used at her trial was discredited. She received her daughter Amy Barlow (Elle Mulvaney) back and attempted to steal Steve from his wife Becky McDonald (Katherine Kelly) and failed. This resulted in the two characters having a feud. Tracy also began a feud with Tina McIntyre (Michelle Keegan), which worsened after it transpired that Tina had kissed Rob Donovan (Marc Baylis). Rob would later murder Tina and after discovering this, Tracy and Rob's sister, Carla Connor (Alison King), turned him in and he was arrested, sparking a feud between Tracy and Carla. Tracy's former husband Robert Preston (Tristan Gemmill) also returned, with Tracy going on to briefly reunite with him. She has since remarried Steve and had a drunken one-night stand with Paula Martin (Stirling Gallacher).

== Casting ==
Tracy was created as the daughter of Deirdre Barlow (Anne Kirkbride) and Ray Langton (Neville Buswell). The first actress to play Tracy was Christabel Finch in 1977, who first appeared in the role when she was 15 days old. According to Finch in 2007, "It was a case of being the right baby, in the right place, at the right time. The casting director came to the baby unit and picked me at random, then asked my parents if I could be in the show." In 2001, Finch reflected on her time in the soap, remembering that she used to share a dressing room with Anne Kirkbride who played Tracy's mother Deirdre and one of her most prominent storyline memories is her involvement in Deirdre's affair with Mike Baldwin (Johnny Briggs): "Because I was a kid, everyone was really friendly to me. Julie Goodyear, who played Bet Lynch, was really lovely and a very down-to-earth person. The biggest plot I was involved in was when Deirdre had an affair with Mike Baldwin. There was a lot of shouting going on and Ken was screaming at her, 'Get out of the house!' I just thought, 'what's going on, why are they shouting?'" Finch left the role when she was seven, as her parents had opted to move to Guernsey.

It was two years until the producers recast Tracy. On screen during that time, Tracy's parents Ken and Deirdre would say that Tracy was either in her room upstairs or at school. Eight-year-old Holly Chamarette was given the role in 1985. At the time she reportedly commented, "I'm thrilled. I've been watching Coronation Street for ages." She was chosen from more than 60 children, but left the role when she was 11, in 1988, quitting the acting profession to become a doctor.

The third actress to play the part was Dawn Acton, appearing regularly between 1988 and 1995. Acton was 11 when she took on the role and played the character through her teenage years, in what Acton has described as Tracy's tarty phase. Acton has said that Tracy's appearances became rare in the mid-1990s, until the casting director James Bain informed her that her contract was not being renewed, as "the storylines involving Tracy had dried up". Acton adds, "I was 17 but I wasn't devastated. There were no tantrums, like the ones Tracy was famous for. James said I should try other things in the acting world. I did – but it didn't work out." After leaving the role, Acton made occasional guest appearances as Tracy until 1999, after which she was unavailable due to becoming a mother.

In November 2002, it was reported that Dawn Acton reauditioned for the role of Tracy, but was unsuccessful, which resulted in the role being given to Kate Ford. A spokeswoman for the soap said: "[Kate] is very excited to have got the part. The character has changed substantially in the past four years and really hits the ground running. Kate is thrilled." Discussing why Acton was not brought back, a spokesperson said, "We [looked] at other actresses because the character has changed so much—she's going to be explosive." Ford was a fan of the show as a child, and revealed that when she was 12, she wrote around ten letters to the casting director requesting a part. The character is portrayed as being extremely selfish and dangerous. She appears to be a tough, fiery and very bitchy character, with Ford stating that "underneath she does care about her daughter which does show a soft side to her".

== Development ==
=== Reintroduction (2002) ===
On 23 October 2002, it was reported that Tracy would be reintroduced later that year. A show spokesman says the new Tracy will be sexy, sassy and opinionated. She will make a beeline for womanising bookie Peter Barlow (Chris Gascoyne), her own stepbrother, before moving on to former sailor Ciaran McCarthy (Keith Duffy) and knicker factory boss Joe Carter (Jonathan Wrather). Tracy returns home to Weatherfield at Christmas after turning to her mother, Deirdre Barlow (Anne Kirkbride), when her marriage breaks down – she left the Street after marrying Robert Preston (Julian Kay) at Weatherfield Register Office. The character was last played by Dawn Acton. A Coronation Street spokesman said: "We are looking at other actresses because the character has changed so much – she's going to be explosive."

Explaining the decision to bring Tracy back as an antagonist, writer Daran Little commented: "You only have to look at a character whose parents got divorced when she was very young and then pulled either way to find out this woman is very flawed and has a chip on her shoulder. So you take that and bring her back a few years later as a very selfish person."

On 13 November 2002, it was announced that Kate Ford had been cast as Tracy. It was reported that Acton was said to be "devastated" when she failed to win the part, which instead went to Ford. But whereas Tracy Barlow was a glum-faced teenager, Tracy Preston – as she is now called – is a sexy, sassy and opinionated man-eater. At the same time, it was also reported that Tracy would sleep with her mother's former flame Dev Alahan (Jimmi Harkishin). A Coronation Street spokeswoman said Ford, fresh from London's Webber Douglas Academy but originally from north Lancashire, was "thrilled" to have landed the role. "She is very excited to have got the part. The character has changed substantially in the past four years and really hits the ground running. Kate is thrilled."

Tracy returned on-screen on 25 December 2002, and she spent no time moping over her failed marriage. "She's been bored in London and she's ready to let her hair down and have some fun. Tracy's a strong, feisty woman and I think at last Dev may have met his match."

=== Pregnancy ===
A storyline involving Tracy in 2003 saw her have a one-night stand with Steve McDonald (Simon Gregson) and wanted to take things further but Steve got back together with his wife Karen (Suranne Jones) instead. In need of an ego boost, Tracy bet Bev Unwin (Susie Blake) 1p that she could bed Roy Cropper (David Neilson), to prove that she could have any man she wanted. Tracy won the bet by subterfuge – drugging Roy. A few weeks later Tracy found out she was pregnant and booked an abortion. Her original intent was to keep quiet but, when confronted by a furious Hayley Cropper (Julie Hesmondhalgh), Tracy blurted out that she was pregnant with Roy's baby. As Roy and Hayley couldn't have children and longed for one, Tracy suggested that they adopt her baby for £20,000. The Croppers agreed but tried to persuade Tracy to marry Roy to guarantee his parental rights. Faced with a legal bill from her divorce from Robert, Tracy agreed, marrying Roy with Hayley and Ciaran as their witnesses. The conclusion of the storyline saw Tracy give birth to baby daughter Amy in February 2004, who was revealed to be Steve's child and not Roy's, leaving Tracy to later go on to have a fight with Steve's wife Karen.

=== Departure (2007) ===
In 2005, Ford made the decision to leave the series, but after being promised more "juicier storylines", she decided to stay. In January 2006, it was reported by the News of the World, that Ford had again insisted that she will bow out next year when her contract expires. A Coronation Street spokesman told Digital Spy: "Kate is contracted until next Spring so she's with us for the foreseeable future." Bill Ward who plays Charlie Stubbs, the boyfriend of Tracy announced his departure from the series in June 2006, an ITV spokesperson commented: "Contrary to press reports Bill's decision to leave is not linked to the future of the character of Tracy Barlow. Actress Kate Ford is contracted to Coronation Street until March 2007." After months of speculation, Ford announced in August 2006 that she was to quit the show the following year.

Tracy kills Charlie Stubbs with a metal sculpture which leads to her eventual departure (2007)

It was announced that Tracy would kill Charlie as part of Ford and Ward's leaving storylines which saw Tracy sentenced to life imprisonment for Charlie's murder. Brian Capron, who played notorious serial killer Richard Hillman from 2001 to 2003, warned Ford and Ward that the murder plot could harm their careers due to the storyline being so high-profile. Ford promised that it's a fitting end for Coronation Street's resident love rat. "Charlie has had this smug attitude that he can do whatever he wants and it has just driven Tracy insane," she said. "He lives by the sword and dies by the sword. I don't think there's a man Tracy's met who's going to get the better of her. She hates what he's turned her into and wants him to die after he continually cheated on her." Ward commented: "He doesn't believe that Tracy would actually go through with murder and thinks himself much smarter. "Charlie has long suspected that Tracy was concocting something evil, and when she reveals her wicked plans he challenges her to go through with it. He doesn't believe she would actually go through with it for a second, so when Tracy actually goes for him it's a complete shock. She attacks him with such ferocity that he doesn't stand a chance." The storyline saw Tracy spending weeks staging arguments, locking herself in the house, and even burning herself with an iron, in order to convince neighbour Claire Peacock (Julia Haworth) that Charlie is abusing her. Ken and Deirdre are also concerned for Tracy's well-being, but she will not leave Charlie. Tracy gives Charlie a lap dance and begins to tell him they will be together forever. While he is distracted, she hits him over the head with a heavy metal sculpture. She taunts him and then hits him again, with a fatal blow. This resulted in Charlie ending up in hospital in a coma. Tracy, meanwhile, is successfully granted bail following an intense grilling by detectives. She ignores her bail conditions and sneaks to the hospital where she leans over an unconscious Charlie. "When Tracy finds out that Charlie hasn't died straight away she's terrified that he might actually wake up and tell the cops the truth," Ford revealed. "She planned to kill him so knowing he's still alive puts her into a panic. She orders Deirdre to take her to the hospital where she wishes her cheating boyfriend would hurry up and die. It's a really worrying time for Tracy as she's desperate to cover her tracks and not be charged with murder. Ford added: "As far as Tracy's concerned Charlie was trying to kill her and that's what she has told everybody. But if Charlie comes to and tells the truth, Tracy will almost certainly be done for attempted murder." Charlie later ends up dying in hospital much to the relief of Tracy.

Coronation Street broadcast an episode on March 25, 2007, which only featured Ford and Kirkbride who played Tracy's mother Deirdre, this was the first episode to feature only two actors since Kevin Kennedy and Sarah Lancashire who played Curly and Raquel Watts in 2000. The episode saw Tracy confess all to Deirdre. Speaking of the episode, Ford said: "Deirdre's been asking questions and Tracy knows she's onto her. Also Tracy's feeling the pressure and she needs to confide in someone after keeping it to herself for so long. It's all too much, so when the big confrontation comes Tracy lets go and confesses to Deirdre that she murdered Charlie in cold blood. She feels like she wants to take the weight off her. For months she's been carrying round this big secret and she needs to offload it, especially now Deirdre's sniffing around. Also, Deirdre intimates that she would lie for her so Tracy's quite confident that she can freely offload." Ford added: "She forces her word that she won't tell anyone and that she'll back her in court, but Deirdre's wavering. She's appalled and wants Tracy to come clean, but she's also her child, her own flesh and blood, so it's hard to consider giving her up. Tracy expects that as her mum Deirdre will stick by her whatever. It was amazing to be able to do an entire episode just with the two of us. I love working with Anne and this was a fantastic opportunity to explore the relationship between the two of them." Tracy's trial aired in March 2007 and the jury delivered the "guilty" verdict, resulting in Tracy being sentenced to life imprisoned. Ford's final episode as Tracy was broadcast on 8 April 2007.

When asked by itv.com in 2013 whether Tracy would ever be driven to kill again, Ford replied: "I don't think she ever wants to go back to prison, she absolutely hated it, so for that reason, no. Also I think she was in such a dark place when she was with Charlie, I don't think she just killed him for the sake of it, she'd gone a bit mental because he was playing games with her head."

=== Reintroduction (2010) ===
On 5 January 2010, it was announced that Ford would reprise the role of Tracy after more than three years away. The actress attributed her return in part to the 2009 return of her friend Shobna Gulati as Sunita Alahan, and her desire to work with Gulati again. Ford believes that the time she has spent in prison has made Tracy's attitude worse, characterising her as "a bit cagey and a bit bitter". She stated that Tracy still loves Steve, but that his new wife Becky would beat her in a fight. Her first scenes were shown in May, when she returned for her grandmother Blanche's funeral. Ford found the scenes difficult to film, following the then recent death of Maggie Jones who played Blanche. She described Tracy as a more ruthless and extreme version of her grandmother.

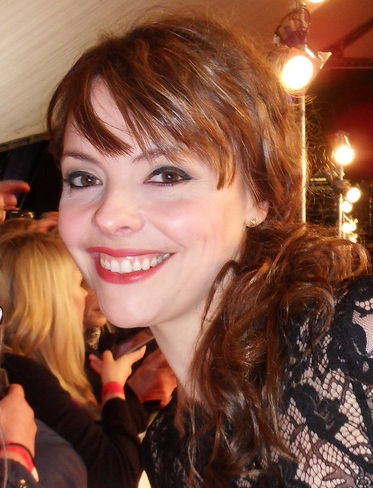
Kate Ford admitted that she was nervous about her return to the serial.

Tracy returned to Weatherfield on a permanent basis later in 2010. The storyline depicting her initial return involved her being offered an early release in exchange for extracting a murder confession from Gail. She falsely accused Gail of her husband Joe McIntyre's (Reece Dinsdale) murder, by telling the police that she hit him with a rolling pin, after Gail told her that she hid a rolling pin on top of a bedroom wardrobe in order to stop poor cook Joe from baking potato pie. The police subsequently found the rolling pin hidden in the house, making Tracy's lie appear true. Tracy decided to testify in court, alleging that Gail was guilty of murdering Joe; Gail was found not guilty of murder and Tracy was furious that she might not be let out early, thus throwing a chair across the room at two police officers who were involved in Gail's case. Later that day, Tracy was attacked by Gail's fellow inmates after they threw water at her and locked her in a cell and beat her up for being a "grass". Tracy was hospitalised.

It was revealed on 4 October that Tracy would return on Christmas Eve 2010, following her shock release from prison. Speaking to Inside Soap, Ford said: "Tracy's absolutely ecstatic to be out of prison, and excited to be home. She's a bit nervous because she knows everybody is going to hate her – but she's basically the same old Tracy!" Ford added: "Primarly [sic] she wants Amy back, but she'd like to be with Steve as well. She wants them to be a family. Steve is Tracy's true love, and she'd do anything to Becky if it meant she could have him." Speaking to Soaplife about Tracy's comeback, Simon Gregson who plays Steve McDonald explained: "I'm really excited. Tracy's a brilliant character. You've got that lightness and then pure evil. And Kate (Ford) does such a good deadpan face. I sometimes have to struggle not to laugh. Her return is a massive shock. Steve instantly thinks, 'Oh no!' He just knows she'll be bringing him loads of flack." Discussing Tracy's demands for custody of Amy, Gregson continued: "Tracy's got [Steve] over a barrel. It turns out Amy's heard Steve and Becky talking about buying Max and she's told Tracy. "That's all the ammunition she needs. She tells Steve if she doesn't get custody she'll shop him and Becky to the authorities."

Tracy returns just as the tram crash memorial service is taking place. By the end of Christmas Eve, she has managed to alienate most of the community, particularly Gail McIntyre and the recently widowed Claire Peacock. On 30 December 2010, after Tracy has complained to Deirdre, Ken, and Peter about being deprived of sex, David Platt confronts her at home about her conduct towards his mother. After a bitter argument, Tracy seduces David. Shortly afterward, Tracy sleeps with Nick Tilsley (Ben Price); they are discovered by Leanne Battersby (Jane Danson). On New Year's Eve, Deirdre and Ken find Tracy unconscious with a head injury. Suspicion falls on Steve, who is standing nearby with blood on his hands.

On 19 May 2011, Ford revealed that the main thing driving her Coronation Street alter-ego Tracy Barlow is the desire to have a family with daughter Amy and former husband, Steve. Speaking to TV Times, Ford said that Tracy is feeling as if her meddling is starting to pay off. "She thinks she can see a shift in Steve, and she knows that his and Becky's relationship is not on firm ground. She's excited because she thinks an opportunity might be presenting itself," Ford explained. "All Tracy wants is for her, Amy and Steve to be a family. She sees that as the key to her fulfilment and happiness. She does love Amy and she's really worried about her mystery illness. When it comes down to it, she will put Amy above anything."

=== Rob Donovan ===
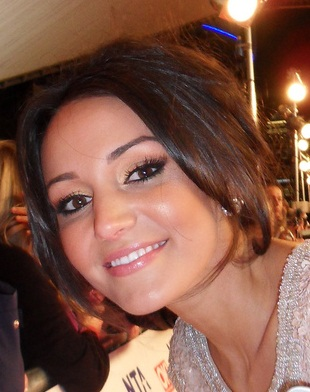
Tracy was one of the suspects in the "Who Killed Tina?" campaign as part of Michelle Keegan's (pictured) departure which saw her character Tina McIntyre murdered.

In December 2012, it was announced that an upcoming storyline would see Tracy begin a dangerous relationship with Rob Donovan (Marc Baylis), the brother of Carla Connor (Alison King). Speaking of the storyline a Coronation Street source said: "Tracy and Rob are a match made in soap hell, They will be fiery, passionate and out to cause trouble." Baylis went on to say: "Watch this space – interestingly, Tracy Barlow comes onto his radar. That is an interesting combination. Without a doubt, he sees something of himself in Tracy and finds her intriguing!" Ford admitted: "She [Tracy] likes the fact that he's quite feisty – it takes one to know one, after all. Maybe they're kindred spirits!" Asked about the kind of a dynamic between Rob and Tracy, Baylis told Digital Spy: "There's a lot of joyful banter – they challenge each other in a fun way. They're quite similar, they can see those similarities and they do have a lot of fun together. They put a smile on each other's faces, and we'll just have to see how it goes from there." Asked if Rob can hold his own when it comes to Tracy, Baylis replied: ""Definitely, otherwise he wouldn't get involved. He is aware of the whole situation that happened with Ryan last year, but he's got a few more years on Ryan and he's been round the block a few times. Rob definitely wouldn't get involved in something that he didn't think he could handle. But Rob does have an arrogant side, and he feels like he could deal with anything. That's one of Rob's main flaws. I've really enjoyed working with Kate Ford on the storyline – we've had an absolute blast. We've been working a lot together, and hopefully the working relationship that we've built up behind the scenes will come across on screen. I'm looking forward to seeing that unfold myself." When asked how Rob first gets Tracy's attention, Ford told All About Soap: "Well, Tracy's going off shopping in town and she gets into a taxi at exactly the same time as Rob. She demands that he leave, as it's her taxi and not his. He refuses to move though, and when Steve asks them where they're going and they both say the city centre at the same time, they share a smile and end up going in the cab together. She likes the fact that he's quite feisty – it takes one to know one, after all. Maybe they're kindred spirits!" Ford also stated that not only is Tracy attracted to Rob, she realises that it would also annoy Michelle (Kym Marsh), adding: "If he had got out of the taxi, she probably wouldn't have fancied him. He's quite easy on the eye too, of course. Plus, he hangs round with Michelle, and if Tracy and Rob were an item, it would annoy her – that's another good reason for Tracy." On Tracy's reaction to being asked out by Rob, she said: "She's quite annoyed at first and she turns him down. But he persists and he flatters her, so she thinks, why not? I think he's like a nicer version of Charlie, so maybe. He's got the bad lad streak, he's ruthless, but he's nowhere near as cruel as Charlie." Tracy convinces Rob to give her a job at Underworld, and when factory boss Carla has doubts over the arrangement, the Tracy promises to behave herself. It was announced that Tracy will put her relationship with Rob before her own daughter as she tries to secure more commitment from him. Tracy decides that she wants to live with Rob, but she knows that he may need some convincing as he is not ready to be a stepfather to Amy. Tracy's interfering stepbrother, Peter, is responsible for planting the idea in Tracy's head, questioning why she hasn't moved in with Rob now that they have a business together. Ford told itv.com: "It definitely strikes a nerve when Peter says that Rob will never see her that way and only cares about himself. Tracy is willing to do anything to move in with Rob, even if it means palming Amy off on Steve and her mum more often. She knows one of the reasons Rob's reluctant to move in with her is because he fears he won't be a good stepdad to Amy, and that's not really the life he wants right now. So to solve this problem, she persuades Steve to have Amy four nights a week and Deirdre the other three." Ford added: "Tracy is very good at twisting people round her finger. Rob's got everything she wants in a man – he's ambitious and driven, he shares her ruthless streak."

A twist in Tracy and Rob's relationship storyline happened when Rob later went to kiss Tina McIntyre (Michelle Keegan). Asked why they end up kissing each other, Baylis replied: "They're playing games with each other. The thing with Rob is that he can't resist a challenge. He'll always rise to the bait, and Tina challenges him. They're both pushing each other while they are flirting and it's all about game playing. That's how it happens." Tracy later finds out about their kiss and is furious, beginning a feud with her and Tina; which would later build up to the departure of Keegan and the murder of Tina for which Tracey was a suspect. Kate Ford, said: "Tracy has committed murder before and got away with it and she certainly takes no prisoners when it comes to getting revenge on people who have wronged her. She has never really forgiven Tina for kissing Rob and trying to take him off her – and for her campaign to try and close down Barlow's Buys when they first opened. Now that she knows Tina has rumbled their dodgy dealings with Tony Stewart (Terence Maynard), it may be that she thinks enough is enough and slips away from her engagement party to confront her – but Tina is every bit as feisty and Tracy might have bitten off more than she can chew trying to keep her quiet." It was later revealed that it wasn't Tracy who killed Tina and in fact it was Rob who killed her. As the storyline concluded Rob was sent to prison leaving Tracy relieved.

=== Tony Stewart ===
In December 2014, it was revealed that Tracy was to have an affair with Tony Stewart (Terence Maynard) who is in a relationship with Liz McDonald (Beverley Callard). Maynard explained: "Tracy is at her lowest ebb. She's broken and she needs validating in some way by a man. She's realized that she's all alone and that she's not going to have a relationship with Rob as he's locked up for life. she thinks that she'll be older and nobody will be interested in her. Tony tells Tracy what she wants to hear, because he does feel for her. He tells her that she looks good, that there are loads of men that would want her. That's when Tracy turns to him and asks him if he'd go there with her. Tony refuses to answer and tells her he's with Liz and that he can't answer that question. Tony makes a point of telling Tracy he's happy with Liz and he puts his cards on the table. But Tracy still comes on strong because she needs this – this is something she needs to stabilise her. If she had a good friend that she could cry to and could go to, this might not be happening – but she needs a sexual validation, so it becomes about power."

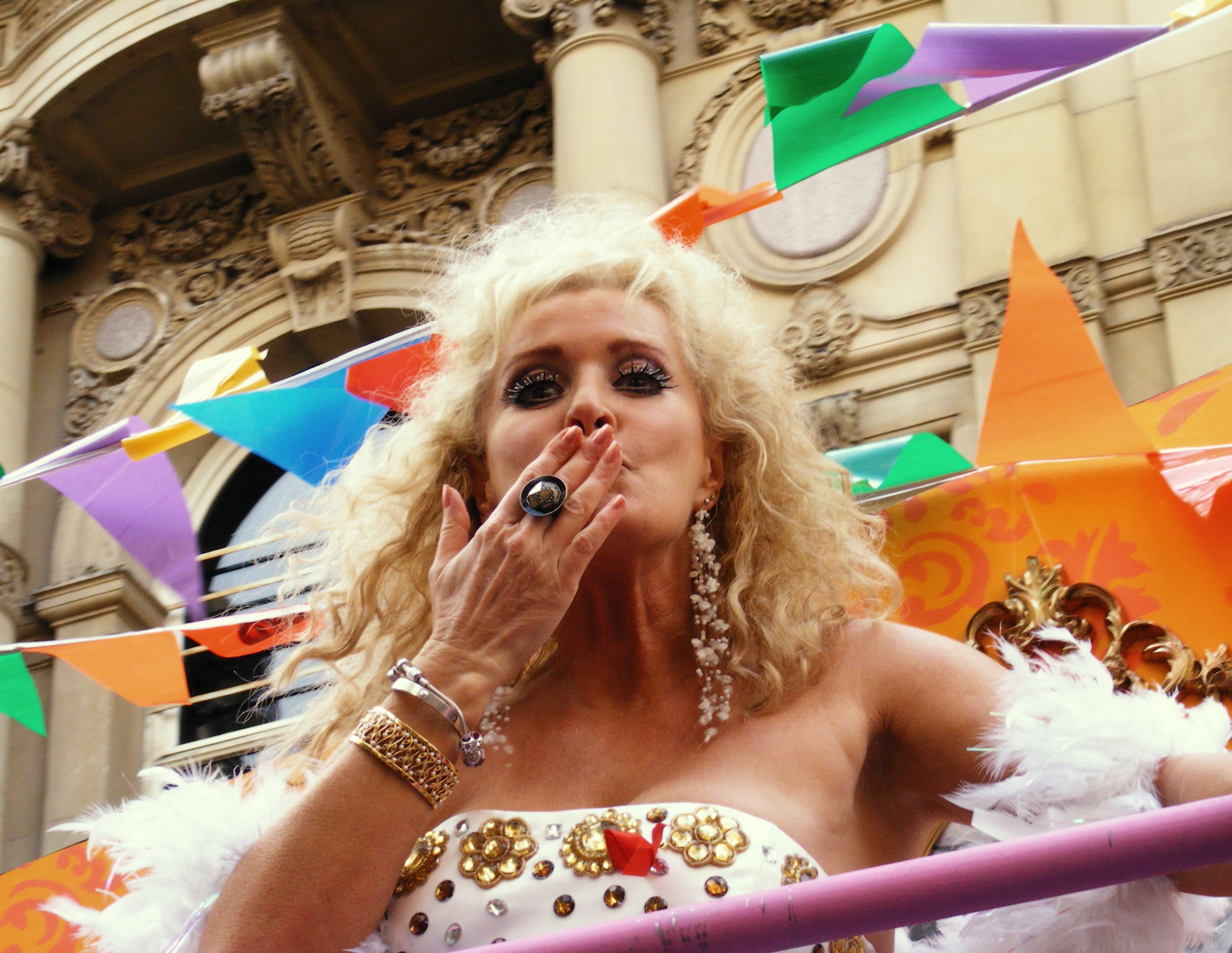
Tracy was involved in an affair with Tony Stewart, the boyfriend of Liz McDonald played by Beverley Callard (pictured).

Asked whether Tony pulls back when Tracy first tries to kiss him, Maynard replied: "He tries to. When she starts kissing him, he is completely disengaged and tries to turn away from her. But there's no doubt about it that there's an attraction to Tracy and he can't deny it. With her coming on so strong, he can't help himself. I think he likes how much of a challenge she's becoming too. He feels lousy afterwards. I think he has concern for what will happen now and for what will happen with Liz. He hopes that's the end of it and that it won't spill out into the public domain. He genuinely loves Liz and he hasn't felt like this about a woman for a very long time so he doesn't want to lose it. He wants to just forget it and move on but it's evident that Tracy isn't going to let it go. From Tony's point of view it's about managing her and playing the game – he wants the business and that's still all he wants." Writers confirmed that the pair's romantic spark wouldn't be just be a one-off, so Tony's attraction to Tracy could grow as time goes on. Maynard added: "He's not in love with her and they're not the same sort of feelings that he has for Liz, but I think he considers Tracy to be a friend of his and I think the feelings he does have for her could well grow." Ford said that Tracy could have met her match in Tony after he sets her up. Tracy agrees to go into business with Tony when he masterminds a situation that leaves her shaken, forcing her to reconsider her options. Tracy is left feeling threatened by a supplier after buying some dodgy stock, only to be rescued by Tony, who is hoping to finally get his hands on the business. Ford said: "When it all goes wrong she's terrified. When he turns violent, she realises it could have gone massively wrong if Tony hadn't come in. She is quite good at protecting herself – she's been in prison so she can handle herself, but she is shaken." However, although Tracy believes she can keep Tony at arm's length once they become business partners, Ford thinks her alter ego could have her work cut out. She said: "Tracy can kind of see through Tony. She is a big girl and she can look after herself. It's more about the money and the fact that she can't cope without him financially. She doesn't think of Tony as her saviour, it's all about the money. Tracy can be pretty ruthless herself so maybe she'll have to play Tony at his own game. I think she's going to have her work cut out though this time." Liz later finds out about the affair when Tracy breaks the news to her on the day of Steve and Michelle's wedding. Callard commented: "At first Liz doesn't quite believe it. She's not concerned about the dodgy things that Tracy and Tony might get up to at Barlow's Buys, but she doesn't believe Tony would do anything else. Tracy then starts to show her texts which prove they've been having an affair. Liz still doesn't quite believe it, but she soon starts to realise there could be some truth to it. Tracy also tells Liz that they've been trying to get The Rovers from underneath her as well. That just puts the lid on it for Liz, but the one thing she's thinking is that she can't let it ruin the wedding day for Steve and Michelle."

=== Robert Preston ===
On 9 May 2015, it was announced that Tristan Gemmill had been cast as Tracy's ex Robert Preston. Robert (then played by Julian Kay) had previously been married to Tracy when Dawn Acton was playing the role. It was announced that Robert will return to Tracy's life in the summer when he turns up unexpectedly at the funeral of her mother Deirdre (Anne Kirkbride). With Tracy grieving following her mother's sudden death and also newly single after splitting from Tony Stewart, she quickly seeks comfort by falling back into Robert's arms. However, if Tracy harbours any hopes for a full reunion with Robert, it won't be easy for her as he is still married to his second wife – something he has neglected to tell her. Played by former Girls Aloud singer Sarah Harding, Robert's wife quickly joins him in Weatherfield to fight for her man. Asked what Robert likes about Tracy, Gemmill replied: ""Now there's a question! I guess some people are attracted to broken people. I've got friends who have poor relationships by anyone's standards because they keep making the same mistake. Maybe Robert is one of those people who is attracted to danger, maybe he thinks he can fix her. There's an element of thrill being with someone who's unpredictable."

=== Kidney infection ===
On 16 May 2016, it was reported by the Metro that an upcoming storyline would see Tracy at "death's door" as her health will take a turn for the worse. It was also revealed that as she faces a fight for life, she may be doing so alone as all of her family will have turned their backs on her in the wake of her feud with Carla. With Tracy only having one kidney, she will end up with an infection. Speaking to Metro.co.uk at a recent press event, Ford explained: "She gets an infection and the people that she thinks will be there for her aren't and she realises she's pushed everyone too far. There'll be a big, bad karma – even her daughter who she took for granted doesn't want to know. Even Ken has been pushed too far – although he does go and see her at the hospital, she is his daughter after all and she is at death's door." Ford also hinted that the terror of the situation might make Tracy change her ways: "It's a different Tracy post-this, for quite some time. She realises she has cut off everybody – the health issue makes being conniving quite difficult! We won't see as much of that in the future." In an interview with Digital Spy, Ford explained why Tracy only has one kidney: "She has only got the one kidney because when she was younger she took an ecstasy tablet in a nightclub and had organ failure. The kidney she's got is Samir Rachid's kidney". Ford also went on to explain the storyline in more detail: "Tracy gets an infection in her kidney, which means that she becomes very poorly as it isn't functioning properly. She's been feeling pain for a while and feeling tired but she's been taking her medication, so isn't overly worried until she suddenly doubles over in agony in the flower shop. She tries to make light of it when she's referred to the transplant clinic, claiming as soon as she's ill, the doctors always presume it's her kidney. But deep down I think she's more worried than she's letting on." Discussing the aftermath of Tracy's subsequent collapse, Ford confirmed: "Well she doesn't die! I think for Tracy the only positive that comes out of it is that she hopes it will bring her and Amy back together. But Amy is quite a tough cookie and she doesn't come to the hospital to see her, even though Tracy is on her deathbed. That really affects Tracy. She's desperate to try to make amends with Amy but it doesn't seem to work. She's very lonely and very emotional when she's at the hospital. Robert visits her and she's hopeful it means they have a future together, but it's not going to be that simple. Especially with Amy, who Tracy fears she may have lost forever."

== Storylines ==
=== 1977–1999 ===
Tracy, the daughter of Ray (Neville Buswell) and Deirdre Langton (Anne Kirkbride) made her first appearance after being born on 24 January 1977. Ray leaves when Tracy is a baby and she is raised by Deirdre and her husband, Ken Barlow (William Roache), who adopts her.

Ken and Deirdre separate in December 1989 when Ken has an affair with Wendy Crozier (Roberta Kerr), his secretary at the Weatherfield Recorder. Initially, Tracy supports Deirdre, but above all else, Tracy wants a return to family life. Once Ken sees the error of his ways and begins seeking a reconciliation, in opposition to Deirdre who wants a divorce, Tracy's allegiance shifts to Ken. Deirdre is subjected to further resentment when she takes up with Dave Barton (David Beckett), who rescues Tracy when she accidentally sets the kitchen on fire. The divorce even affects Tracy's school life as Ken gets a teaching job there in 1990, as he can stay updated on Deirdre's exploits through Tracy. Caught between Ken and Deirdre, Tracy starts to rebel by playing truant from school, going instead to the amusement arcade with twin brothers Steve (Simon Gregson) and Andy McDonald (Nicholas Cochrane). 1991 also sees Tracy get her first boyfriend, Graham Egerton (Paul Aspden), but it does not last long and they end their relationship.

Tracy meets Robert Preston (Julian Kay) and they decide to marry in 1996. They intend to marry in London, where they are living, but when telling Ken and Deirdre her news, Tracy decides to marry in Weatherfield instead, on the cheap; she books the Registry Office immediately and buys a £14 wedding dress from a charity shop. The wedding is a success and Robert and Tracy return to London. Tracy visits Weatherfield three times over the next few years: she comes to Deirdre and her fiancé, Jon Lindsay's (Owen Aaronovitch) engagement party in 1997 and approves of Jon (who is really a confidence man), and then in 1999, she seeks refuge in Weatherfield after falling out with Robert, who accused Tracy of having an affair with her friend after he saw them kissing. Robert follows Tracy to Weatherfield and they reconcile when he accepts her story that she and Dan are just friends. Tracy is delighted when Ken and Deirdre finally reconcile.

=== 2002–2007 ===
Tracy returns on Christmas Day 2002, claiming that Robert has cheated on her, but it emerges that she was sleeping with Robert's best friend; so she and Robert divorce. Tracy has a brief fling with Dev Alahan (Jimmi Harkishin) but when she realises Dev thinks she is not "marriage material", she dumps him before cutting up his suits and stealing his credit card.

In August 2003, Tracy places a bet with Bev Unwin (Susie Blake) that she can sleep with married Roy Cropper (David Neilson). She spikes his drink and then claims they slept together when he wakes up in her bed the next morning. Roy is racked with guilt and his wife Hayley Cropper (Julie Hesmondhalgh) is heartbroken and when Tracy discovers she is pregnant, she threatens to have an abortion unless Roy and Hayley buy the baby for £15,000. With Hayley being a trans woman, they agree, much to the disgust of the Barlow family. Roy and Hayley worry Tracy will flee with their money and the baby so Roy marries Tracy to gain legal rights to the baby. In February 2004, after delivering her daughter, whom Roy and Hayley name Patience, Tracy wants her daughter back and admits at Steve and Karen McDonald's (Suranne Jones) wedding that Steve is her daughter's biological father, not Roy and she lied about them having sex. Not surprisingly, this causes a feud between her and Karen but Roy is persuaded by Ken to return Tracy's daughter, whom she renames Amy (Holly Bowyer and Rebecca Pike).

Tracy taunts Karen when she does not get pregnant as quickly as Tracy did, calling her "Barren" Karen. Karen does get pregnant, but miscarries soon after in December 2004. Karen struggles to cope and finds Tracy's sympathy harder to cope with than her taunting, leading her to steal and torch Tracy's car. Tracy is devastated, thinking Amy is dead because she was in the car, and angrily goes after Karen, threatening to kill her. Only Steve's insistence that Amy is safe with Roy and Hayley, makes Tracy stop and he ends his marriage to Karen, reminding her that he is grieving too and could have lost two children. Tracy watches triumphantly as Karen leaves and Steve tries to reconcile with Tracy but realises he wants Amy, not her. This leads to a bitter custody battle, with Tracy making it look as if Steve tried to kidnap Amy and even accusing him of abusing her. While Tracy wins primary custody, the judge does not believe her accusations and allows Steve visits with Amy.

Short-lived flings with Ciaran McCarthy (Keith Duffy) and Nathan Harding (Ray Fearon) follow, until Tracy starts to date Charlie Stubbs (Bill Ward) in December 2005. However, Charlie has a one-night stand with his ex-girlfriend, Shelley Unwin (Sally Lindsay), ultimately resulting in her pregnancy. Although Tracy forgives Charlie, he betrays her again with Maria Sutherland (Samia Ghadie). Tracy concocts a plan for revenge, spreading lies that Charlie is abusing her while suggesting to Charlie that she is cheating. When Charlie decides to throw Tracy out, she announces her intention to kill him, which he does not believe. In January 2007, she seduces him, then hits him twice on the head with a metal ornament, taunting him as she does; she tries to convince the police that it was self-defence but fails and is charged with murder after Charlie dies. Tracy is released on bail and David Platt (Jack P. Shepherd) gives the police a statement, claiming to have witnessed the murder in return for sleeping with Tracy, which she does, desperate to avoid going to prison. He lies under oath, but his evidence is dismissed by the court and, following Tracy's confession to Deirdre that the murder was planned, Deirdre is unconvincing as a witness. Consequently, Tracy is found guilty and sentenced to life imprisonment with a minimum of 15 years before parole. In financial ruin, Ken and Deirdre can not pay for an appeal, leaving Tracy to serve her sentence, while Amy (now played by Amber Chadwick) is sent to live with Steve.

=== 2010–present ===
In May 2010, Tracy is allowed a day release from prison to attend her grandmother Blanche Hunt's (Maggie Jones) funeral. While at the funeral she argues with Steve's wife, Becky McDonald (Katherine Kelly) when she realises that Becky is playing a mother figure to Amy (now played by Elle Mulvaney). On Christmas Eve 2010, Tracy returns to the Street. She tells the Barlows that the expert who handled the forensic evidence for her trial falsified his qualifications so she has been released on bail, pending a retrial. Tracy is found not guilty at the retrial, owing to the unreliability of forensic evidence. Tracy begins a feud with Becky, regularly taunting her over her inability to give Steve a child. She antagonises several residents on the street, seduces David and Nick Tilsley (Ben Price), and demands access to Amy against Steve and Becky's wishes. Just after midnight on New Year's Day 2011, Tracy is attacked on the back porch of Ken and Dierdre's home by an unseen assailant and put into a coma. Several street residents are suspects including Steve, Becky, Nick, David, and Gail McIntyre (Helen Worth). After waking from her coma, Tracy names Becky as her assailant, but it is revealed to be Claire Peacock (Julia Haworth). Claire turns herself in to the police but when she is released on bail, flees the country with her two sons. Becky refuses to tell Tracy where Claire went, so her plans for revenge are in vain. Tracy learns that Becky stole £5,000 from the Corner Shop on the night of the tram crash to buy Max Turner from his mother Kylie (Paula Lane). She takes Amy to move in with her in exchange for her not going to social services and Steve is forced to acquiesce. As Becky and Tracy's feud intensifies, Steve and Becky's marriage disintegrates and he and Tracy begin a relationship. She becomes pregnant with twins. Steve and Becky go into business together and they meet with a hotel manager. Tracy believes that they are having an affair and follows them to the hotel but is unable to find them and has a miscarriage. She confronts Becky over her and Steve but Becky insists that nothing happened. Tracy intentionally falls down the stairs in Becky's house but lies to Steve that Becky pushed her down the stairs and caused the miscarriage. Deirdre discovers Tracy's lies but Tracy insists that she loves Steve and convinces Deirdre to keep quiet. Steve and Tracy's relationship is cemented and Becky is ostracised by the street. Steve proposes to her on Christmas Day and they marry after his divorce with Becky is finalised. Becky crashes the reception at the Rovers with a copy of Tracy's medical records, proving that she lied about being pushed down the stairs and miscarrying. Furious, Steve breaks up with her but is unable to legally end the marriage until after a year or kick her out of the house as it is in both their names. Ken is unable to forgive Tracy for her lies, and throws her out of the house. He eventually allows her to move back in she falls unconscious due to kidney failure.

Tracy begins dating Rob Donovan (Marc Baylis). Rob and Tracy then buy the bookmakers' and turn it into a pawnbroker's shop. Tracy is furious when Norris Cole (Malcolm Hebden) tells her that Rob kissed Tina McIntyre (Michelle Keegan) and that his elder sister Carla Connor (Alison King) knew about it. Rob attacks Tina in her own home, leading to her running to the balcony, where the argument continues. He tries to persuade Tina not to tell Carla about her affair with Peter, unaware that Peter has told her himself,– to save her feelings and threatens her not to say anything to the police about their dealings with Tony. Tina refuses, so as Rob pushes her away, Tina loses her balance and falls from the balcony, plummeting onto the cobbles below. Rob believes that Tina is dead, so leaves her flat panic-stricken. He then hears Tina's groans and realises that she is still alive. Tina threatens to tell the police that Rob pushed her from the balcony on purpose in an attempt to kill her. This pushes Rob over the edge, leading to him picking up a metal pipe and beating her with it. Tracy is happy that Tina has been hospitalised, as she hated her, but is more sympathetic when she dies. Rob calls her from a B&B, admitting to killing Tina. Tracy agrees to bring money to him, which she takes out of their wedding cards. They meet but upon saying goodbye, Tracy decides she wants to go on the run with him. They plan for her to collect their things and meet the following evening. However, when they meet it is revealed that Tracy has called the police, as she did not want to leave Amy behind or go to prison again. A tearful Tracy tells Rob that she is sorry, and he is led away by the police.

Tracy starts an affair with Tony Stewart (Terence Maynard), who is in a relationship with Steve's mother Liz McDonald (Beverley Callard), but tells Liz about it before Steve and Michelle Connor's (Kym Marsh) wedding in May 2015. Tracy accidentally starts a fire when she sneaks into Carla's flat and leaves a candle there after leaving. Amy, who was in the flat, and Carla are saved, but Kal Nazir (Jimi Mistry) and Maddie Heath (Amy James-Kelly) die due to the resulting explosion. As Tracy is nowhere to be seen, Carla is blamed for the fire. Tracy is distraught when Deirdre dies. At Deirdre's funeral, Ken snaps at her after learning that Deirdre wouldn't come home as she felt ashamed of Tracy's affair with Tony. Tracy storms out and her ex-husband Robert (now Tristan Gemmill) follows. Back at the house, Robert and Tracy admit there are still feelings between them and Tracy tries to seduce him. Ken decides to give Tracy another chance and goes round to sort things out, only to find Robert and Tracy half-dressed. Ken throws Robert out and lashes out at a guilt-stricken Tracy, and they later argue. Tracy later opens her own florist and calls it "Prestons Petals" in a bid to win Robert back; however, she later finds out Robert slept with Carla and she threatens her. Tracy later collapses due to her kidney and is hospitalised.

In March 2017, Ken is pushed down the stairs by an unknown assailant, however, the police suspect one of the Barlow family members. Tracy opens his will whilst he is in hospital and finds out that she has been left nothing by him, but unknown to her, Ken changed it and was given everything to her. In April 2017, after Luke breaks up with her due to suspicion, he believes something is going on with her, Tracy meets with Rob who is out of prison somehow and it becomes apparent she was with him the night Ken was pushed. In a conversation between them both, it is revealed Rob has been in contact with Tracy and that she has been helping him as he has escaped from prison after being transferred and the car he was in crashed. A few days later, they have sex after Rob tells her he will move away and Tracy says she wants to live with him. In May 2017, after Tracy goes on the run with Rob taking Amy, who is unaware Rob is with them, with her to a Peak District cottage, they are reported as missing people after Adam finds Tracy has taken Amy's passport and tells Steve. The next day, Amy runs away and rings Steve, letting the police track down where she phoned. When she comes back from the call, she walks in on Tracy and Rob kissing, just before he sees the police coming up to the cottage. Tracy pleads with Amy not to tell anyone they have been with Rob and sends her with him so he can take her home before he continues his journey on the run. Tracy tells Rob she is covering for Amy, who she believes pushed Ken and they share a goodbye. When the armed police arrive she tells them she had pushed him and they arrest her for attempted murder. In court, Rob storms in and tells Tracy and the courtroom, that it wasn't Amy who pushed Ken so she retracts her statement and pleads not guilty after Rob gives her an alibi, saying she was with him the night Ken was pushed. She then meets with Rob in her cell for the last time before he is moved to solitary, and they have to say goodbye before having sex. She is released from prison a few days later. In June 2017, she later discovers Ken's son Daniel Osbourne (Rob Mallard) was the culprit who pushed Ken, and she is furious and she disowns him. Over Christmas, she rekindles her relationship with Steve. In January 2018, Tracy is left distraught when ex-boyfriend Luke Britton is murdered by Pat Phelan (Connor McIntyre).

Steve proposes to Tracy and she accepts, and she also becomes close with Abi Franklin (Sally Carman). On the wedding day, Tracy suspects Steve of having an affair with Abi, which she denies, but Tracy tampers with a car Abi is meant to be fixing. She later finds out Steve did not sleep with Abi and asks her to be a maid of honour again. As Tracy walks down the aisle she threatens Leanne Battersby (Jane Danson), unaware that Leanne has recently slept with Steve. After remarrying Steve, Leanne tries to apologize for sleeping with Steve, when Tracy was actually just mad at her for not letting Leanne and Steve's son Oliver Battersby wear a kilt. Tracy and Leanne have a fight after she punches Steve, who she tells she wants a divorce, however after getting drunk, Tracy goes on her honeymoon to Morocco with him. She returns over a week later, telling everyone that she has left Steve in the desert and took his passport with her. She finds out that the car she tampered with was involved in an accident, which left Ryan Connor (Ryan Prescott) in a coma and Leanne badly injured. Abi is blamed for not fixing the car properly and when the police want to look at Kevin Webster's (Michael Le Vell) laptop for CCTV, Tracy steals Abi's keys for the garage and the laptop.

Amy tells Tracy and Steve that she is pregnant at the age of 14 and when Tracy learns that the father is at the legal age of consent, she pressures Amy to have an abortion. When Amy refuses, Tracy and Steve plan to adopt the baby and raise it as their own. Amy later feels emotionally neglected by Tracy and Steve and has a secret abortion. Tracy later learns about this and admits that she has neglected Amy's emotional wellbeing over the baby.

== Reception ==
When Tracy was blackmailed by David, Steven Perkins of Lowculture commented: "It's very incredibly wrong, and yet they're both so vile that it goes right around the loop and goes back to being a thoroughly great idea." Fellow Lowculture contributor Nick Linsdell praised Tracy as "one of the all-time great, completely horrific, self-absorbed soap monsters." He deemed her trial testament to the show's writers, as, even with a character who has been part of Coronation Street since birth: "they've come up with an exit storyline that outdoes all her previous exploits and dragged in half the cast to enjoy the fun." Perkins also praised the trial storyline, commenting: "It makes for quite a nice change to have sat through a soap trial, knowing for once that The Accused was (a) guilty as sin, (b) acting in a deliberate, calculated and premeditated fashion and (c) not trying to frame someone else." Alongside this unusual premise, he noted: "there are probably quite a few people who secretly want to see That Bitch Tracy Barlow finally get hers."

Radio Times included Tracy in their feature profiling 'bunny boilers' of soap opera. Discussing her they stated: "Qualifying as much as a soap villain as a bunny-boiler, grown-up Tracy in her final incarnation displayed enough deranged behaviour to have Flopsy, Mopsy and Cottontail bounding for the hills." Opining on her temper they added: "Tracy was capable of a rage so hot that, by comparison, the fires of hell were chilly." They also offered their opinion on what could have made her this way, blaming Ken's and Deirdre's behaviour.

In 2014, Matt Bramford from What to Watch put Tracy on his list of the 18 best recastings in British and Australian soap operas, commenting that Acton's version of Tracy "only ever seemed to go upstairs and play her tapes" whilst Ford transformed the character. A reporter writing for the Inside Soap Yearbook 2017 named Tracy and Carla's feud as one of the "best bits of February", describing the pair as "sworn enemies". They described Tracy confronting Carla as "the big moment" in the episodes.

In February 2011, Ford was nominated for Best Comeback in the Soap Bubble Awards for her portrayal of Tracy. Tracy was nominated in the category of "Villain of the Year" at the 2011 Inside Soap Awards. In January 2020, following Tracy's one-night stand with Paula, Laura-Jayne Tyler from Inside Soap wrote "Say what you like about Tracy Barlow. She's never lost her ability to surprise."
