= Karen McDonald (Coronation Street) =

Fictional character in British soap opera

- Coronation Street character
- Portrayed by: Suranne Jones
- Duration: 2000–2004
- First appearance: Episode 4843; 21 June 2000
- Last appearance: Episode 5924; 26 December 2004
- Introduced by: Jane Macnaught
In-universe information
- Other names: Karen Phillips
- Occupation: Machinist
- Father: Malcolm Phillips
- Mother: Margaret Phillips
- Husband: Steve McDonald (2001–2003, 2004–2006)
- Stepdaughters: Amy Barlow
- Aunts: Eva Briggs

Karen McDonald (also Phillips) is a fictional character from the British ITV soap opera Coronation Street, played by Suranne Jones. Karen was created by producer Jane Macnaught as a recurring character and one of the factory girls. She made her debut in the episode airing on 21 June 2000. On 13 May 2004, Jones announced her decision to leave the soap and her final episode was broadcast on 26 December 2004. Karen's storylines have focused on her number of boyfriends including: Vikram Desai (Chris Bisson), Joe Carter (Jonathan Wrather), and Steve McDonald (Simon Gregson); additionally, her miscarriage and her feud with Tracy Barlow (Kate Ford), the mother of Steve's daughter, Amy.

== Development ==
=== Casting ===
Suranne Jones was cast as machinist Karen by then executive producer Jane Macnaught in early 2000, having previously appeared briefly in April 1997 as Mandy Phillips, the girlfriend of Chris Collins (Matthew Marsden).

=== Steve McDonald ===
Rick Fulton of the Daily Record noted that Karen vows to be more "wily" with her romantic interests after seeing her friend Bobbi Lewis (Naomi Ryan) "wrapping boyfriend Vikram Desai (Chris Bisson) around her little finger". Her friend and colleague Janice Battersby (Vicky Entwistle) makes a series of bets with Karen regarding how new boyfriend Steve McDonald (Simon Gregson) treats her: this culminates in Janice betting Karen that she can get Steve to propose to her. Of the storyline, Jones stated that: "Karen can't believe she's on the verge of getting married for a bet". She characterises Karen as "not the type of girl to back out of a tricky situation" and states that she and Steve find themselves "in a game of bluff" with each "waiting for the other to pull out." Karen was the 53rd female character to get married in Coronation Street. Gregson, who plays Steve, felt the marriage was "quite fitting" and that his character "thinks it's a bit of a laugh". The wedding scenes were filmed on 6 May 2001 and screened on 30 May 2001. Billy Sloan of the Sunday Mail stated that the scenes were "guaranteed to provide a bit of light relief" after serious storylines such as the rape of Toyah Battersby (Georgia Taylor) and Alma Baldwin's (Amanda Barrie) cancer diagnosis. Jones felt that Steve was "definitely the man for Karen" as the two characters had "similar personalities". She stated that Karen had dumped her previous boyfriend, Vikram, because he "wasn't racy enough and doesn't have the edge Steve has".

In September 2001, Jones stated that she "[feels] sorry for Steve sometimes" in regard to Karen's negative characteristics. She indicated that she'd "love to see Steve and Karen having the same impact on viewers as Dirty Den and Angie did". In November 2001 the two characters fall out because Karen insults Steve's mother Liz (Beverley Callard), though they later end up back together. Discussing the success of the pairing, Gregson compared Steve and Karen to "a mini Jack and Vera" with "the shouting and the arguments" and "the feistiness of the characters". He added that Steve and Karen "can't live with each other and can't live without each other". Gregson also remarked that the relationship was "going back to what Coronation Street set out to be" which he felt to be "hen-pecked husbands and very strong women".

=== Departure ===
On 13 May 2004, it was revealed that Jones had decided to leave Coronation Street after four years of playing Karen. Discussing her reason for quitting Jones said: "I just think the time is right for me to move on and explore other acting opportunities". She also revealed that she loved playing Karen and thanked her co-stars including Gregson and revealed that if it was not for the material and Gregson that she would not be where she is today and that she was very grateful. Jones also revealed that there would be a big fight scene between her and Tracy Barlow (Kate Ford) before she leaves. She filmed her final scenes in November 2004 and they were broadcast on Boxing Day 2004. Jones revealed that she would be open to returning to Coronation Street sometime in the future revealing that she told the producers that she wanted to do other things first before she went back.

== Storylines ==
Karen arrives in Coronation Street in June 2000 as a friend of Linda Sykes (Jacqueline Pirie) who she used to work with at Wheelers. Karen is taken on as a new machinist at Underworld. She quickly finds herself popular with the men of the street and has a fling with Vikram Desai (Chris Bisson). Over Christmas, she is drinking alone in The Rovers Return Inn, and ends up spending the night with Peter Barlow (Chris Gascoyne).

In 2001, Karen is dating Steve McDonald (Simon Gregson). Her colleague, Janice Battersby (Vicky Entwistle) says that none of Karen's boyfriends ever took her seriously. Janice bets £10 that Karen won’t be able to get engaged, so Karen persuades Steve to propose in front of The Rovers' regulars. Neither Karen nor Steve will back out, but each thinks that the other will. They hold the reception at The Rovers. Six weeks later, they finally arrange their honeymoon in Florida. Having moves into the flat above StreetCars, Karen soon gets fed up and they move into the flat over The Kabin. Karen then comes up with an idea. She and Steve should separate so they could have the wedding of "their" dreams. She decides it must seem like the couple have fallen out, so she stages arguments in The Rovers and throws his belongings out into the street, setting many residents against him. After many pleas, he finally has enough and tells her that the separation will happen, but there won’t be another wedding. Karen tries desperately to stop the separation but is too late. She is surprised when Steve prepares a romantic night on a canal boat and proposes. They set a date for February 2004. However, over Christmas 2003, Tracy Barlow (Kate Ford) tells Steve that he is the father of the baby she is expecting, not Roy Cropper's (David Neilson), following a one-night stand when he and Karen were apart. Unable to accept that Steve doesn’t want her, Tracy cancels the flowers for the wedding and the venue. Steve finds out in time and manages to book another venue that Karen had wanted without her knowing. The second wedding day arrives, and most of Weatherfield goes. Tracy also goes uninvited, determined to get her baby back, and ruins the ceremony by blurting out that Steve was the baby’s father when the Croppers insist that the baby is staying with them. However, Tracy's adoptive father, Ken Barlow (William Roache), tells Roy and Hayley that they legally have no choice but to give the baby up, so they admit defeat and hand her over. Karen is distraught that her dream wedding was ruined, and that Tracy is on a mission to break Steve and Karen up, but they eventually remarry once Steve convinces Karen that Tracy means nothing to him. When Karen learns about what Tracy has done to ruin her wedding, she is furious. Wanting revenge, she goes to Amy's (Rebecca Pike) christening, determined to spoil the Barlows' day. The two women brawl in the church and Karen punches Tracy.

In August 2004, Karen's father, Malcolm Phillips (Richard Bremmer), turns up at her and Steve's flat. He informs Karen that her mother, Margaret, is dying and asks Karen to visit her, but she refuses and throws him out before telling Steve about her childhood. Karen's mother dies a week later, sending Karen on an emotional rollercoaster. In November 2004, Karen goes to Dublin to spend some time with Linda. Steve is tricked by Tracy and Liz McDonald (Beverley Callard) into going to London, where he finds out that the "McDonald-Barlows" are to appear on a new quiz show called "Top of the Tree". Steve concedes defeat and agrees to appear on the show. The family wins a car, thanks to Karen being Steve's "Phone a Friend" and providing the winning answer, (not realising that it was a game show). When Karen finds out about the game show, she is fuming. At the Underworld Christmas party, Karen starts to have stomach pains, and it is later confirmed that she has miscarried. Grieving, Karen is emotional, and when she discovers that Liz told Tracy about her miscarriage, she is furious. She takes the car won on the game show, not realising that baby Amy was in the back, and sets fire to it on the Red Rec. Tracy and Steve are frantic, thinking that Amy is dead, and this leads to Karen and Tracy fighting on the roof of Underworld. Karen had dropped Amy off at the Croppers but didn't tell Tracy that, wanting to hurt her. The next day, Steve ends their marriage and tells her to leave. Heartbroken, Karen pleads for another chance, but Steve refuses, so Karen leaves Weatherfield on Boxing Day 2004. In February 2005, Karen later files for a divorce, which is finalised in January 2006.

== Reception ==
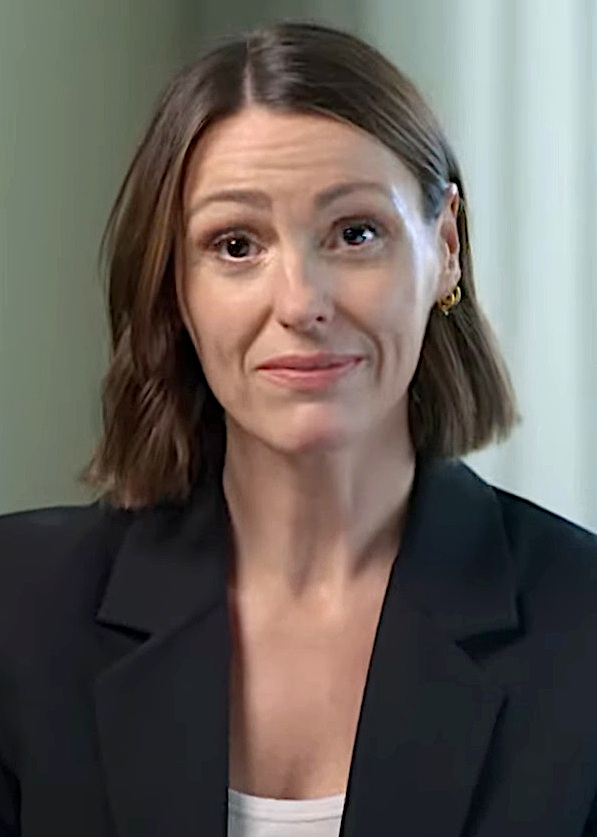
The Sunday Mirror stated that Suranne Jones (pictured) had "proved an instant hit with viewers".

The character of Karen was generally well received by the public and the British Media. In February 2002 The Sunday Mirror stated that Suranne Jones had "proved an instant hit with viewers" after joining the serial in June 2000. In December 2002 the Coventry Evening Telegraph ran a headline describing the character as "Britain's Favourite TV Bitch". In 2003, the 'will they, won't they?' storyline between Karen and Joe Carter was a ratings winner with over 15 million viewers tuning in, maintaining the high ratings of the highly successful Richard Hillman murder storyline. Karen and Steve's (second) wedding in February 2004, ruined by Tracy Barlow's revelation that her daughter Amy Barlow was Steve's love child, received 16.3 million viewers. After the announcement of her departure, Selina Scott of the Sunday Mail stated that Suranne Jones had "done as much as any of the [Coronation Street] cast to see off the challenge of EastEnders". She felt that Suranne Jones had made the "recklessly upwardly-mobile Karen into a genuine character" and was "the only thing that stops Steve 'Mogadon' McDonald becoming a cure for insomnia."

The Mirror's Nicola Methven and Polly Hudson predicted that the start of Karen's exit from the show would find "soapville on its knees in front of the TV, sobbing uncontrollably". They felt that the introduction of Karen's "fanatically religious parents" meant that "everything about the woman she is today started to make sense". The authors gave particular praise to the relationship between Karen and Steve, opining that Gregson and Jones "lit up the screen once again" and provided "pure [television] gold". Danielle Lawler, writing for The Sunday Mirror in November 2004 referred to a scene where Karen attacked Tracy as "another classic clobbering". However, Frances Taylor of the Daily Record was critical of the character's exit plot. She stated that both "Karen McDonald—and the writers—lost the plot in spectacular fashion". She felt the character's exit was "pants" and expressed disappointment that the character of Tracy was left "to rule the Street". The character is remembered for her distinct personality and style: The Guardian's Rosanna Greenstreet described her as "a bulldog in hoop earrings" in September 2005. Actress Kym Marsh, upon joining the serial stated that she wanted her character, Michelle Connor, to be like Karen: "a likeable lady, but with a serious attitude". In 2010 Gerard Gilbert of The Independent, reminiscing on the character, stated that Suranne Jones brought a "vital spark to Britain's best-loved soap, as a Victoria Beckham wannabe from the wrong side of the tracks." In a discussion of whether there is "life after Corrie" Ben Frow, head of TV3 broadcasting, compared Jones' portrayal of Karen to Katherine Kelly's portrayal of Becky McDonald. He states: "the successful ones [to have a career after Coronation Street]—like Suranne and Katherine—tend to play the few real, gritty, true characters in the soap." Andrew Billen of The Times described Jones as one of "those brave, talented few who earn their wings on a soap and then fly gloriously beyond it"

For her portrayal of Karen, Jones has won and been nominated for a number of awards. In 2002 she was nominated in the "Sexiest Female" and "Villain of the Year" awards at the British Soap Awards. At the 2003 Inside Soap Awards she won two awards; for Best Dressed Star and Best Couple (shared with Simon Gregson). In 2004 Jones won "Sexiest Female" at the Inside Soap Awards in addition to "Best Actress" at the British Soap Awards and "Most Popular Actress" at the National Television Awards. She also won Best Actress at the 2005 British Soap Awards.
