= Dawn Acton =

English actress

- Born: Dawn Jean Acton; 15 March 1977 (age 49); Ashton-under-Lyne, England
- Occupation: Actress
- Children: 1

Dawn Jean Acton (born 15 March 1977) is an English actress, known for playing the role of Tracy Barlow in the ITV soap opera Coronation Street between 1988 and 1999. She left the soap opera at age 22, after giving birth to her son.

As a child, she attended Stamford High School in Ashton-under-Lyne and trained at the Oldham Theatre Workshop.

Acton now works as a DJ. She has also been involved in charity work for local organisations.
