= Neville Buswell =

British actor (1943–2019)

- Born: Neville Alfred Morris Buswell; 20 January 1943; Prestbury, Cheshire, England
- Died: 25 December 2019 (aged 76); Las Vegas, Nevada, U.S.
- Occupations: Actor, Croupier, Mortgage Broker
- Years active: 1955–1978; 1997, 2005
- Spouse: Suzanne Huckle (m. 1969)

Neville Alfred Morris Buswell (20 January 1943 – 25 December 2019) was a British actor, best known for his role as Ray Langton in the ITV Soap opera Coronation Street.

== Early years ==
Buswell attended Belmont Abbey School near Hereford from 1955 to 1960, and represented the school at rowing and rugby – he was a fast and aggressive open side wing forward – and took part in the thriving amateur dramatics society with leading roles in Gilbert and Sullivan operettas and straight plays such as Patrick Hamilton's Rope. Buswell attended RADA and graduated in 1964.

== Career ==
After playing a number of roles on several TV plays and episodes, he first appeared on Coronation Street in 1966, leaving that same year. He returned in 1968 and remained in the cast for ten years until he chose not to renew his contract rather abruptly in late 1978. He wanted to move to the United States to be with his wife and her relatives. In the plot line, Ray was written out just as abruptly, leaving his wife Deirdre and young daughter to live in Amsterdam.

For the next 13 years, Buswell worked as a croupier, and later as a supervisor/manager at a Las Vegas casino and from 1991 as a mortgage broker. Reality and fiction blended together in 1997, when he returned to the role of Ray Langton, who was now a Vegas croupier, for a one-off special Viva Las Vegas.

After 26 years away, Buswell was written back into Coronation Street in episodes that aired in March 2005, for a six-week run. His character Ray Langton died of cancer in an episode that aired in the UK on 10 April 2005, at Deirdre's and Ken's wedding Reception in the Rovers Return. Buswell retired in February 2008 at the age of 65 and continued to live in Las Vegas.
