= Kate Ford =

English actress (born 1976)

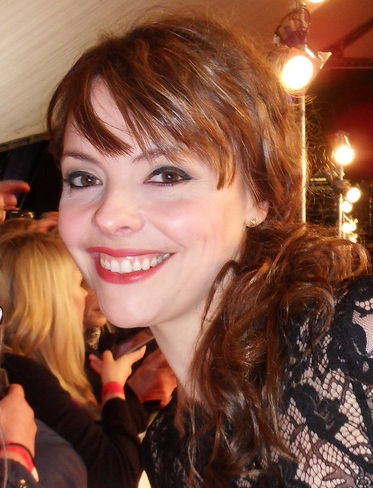
- Ford in 2009
- Born: 29 December 1976 (age 49); Salford, Greater Manchester, England
- Occupation: Actress
- Years active: 1995, 2001–present
- Known for: Role of Tracy Barlow in Coronation Street
- Spouse: Jon Connerty (m. 2007; div. 2015)
- Children: 1
- Awards: British Soap Award for Best Bitch; 2004 Coronation Street; 2005 Coronation Street; British Soap Award for Best Actress; 2007 Coronation Street

Kate Ford (born 29 December 1976) is an English actress. She is known for her portrayal of Tracy Barlow in the ITV soap opera, Coronation Street (2002–2007, 2010–present).

Ford was born in Salford, Greater Manchester. She attended Queen Elizabeth School in Kirkby Lonsdale, Cumbria and Blackpool and The Fylde College, Lancashire. She later trained at the Webber Douglas Academy of Dramatic Art.

== Career ==
Kate's earliest work is in the music video for The Beatles song "Free as a Bird" in 1995. Some years later in 2002, she appeared in a spin-off episode of the popular BBC1 soap opera EastEnders, which revolved around the characters of Ricky Butcher (Sid Owen) and Bianca Jackson (Patsy Palmer).

Ford took on the role of Tracy Barlow in Coronation Street in the autumn of 2002. She is the fourth actress to play the role of Tracy Barlow after Christabel Finch played her from her birth in 1977 to 1983, Holly Chamarette taking over from 1985 to 1988 and Dawn Acton playing the role from 1988 to 1999. Ford brought a darker side to the character in the programme, making her more "bitchy" than the simply misunderstood girl the other actresses portrayed.

In 2004 and 2005, Ford was awarded a British Soap Award for "Best Bitch" for her work on Coronation Street and around the same time appeared in a high-profile poster campaign for PETA. In 2007, she was awarded two British Soap Awards, one for Best Actress and another for Best Storyline, which was shared with Samia Smith (Maria Sutherland) and Bill Ward (Charlie Stubbs). Ford left Coronation Street after her contract expired in April 2007. In June 2007, she filmed her first role after leaving Coronation Street, as Adele in Blue Murder, a detective drama.

== Personal life ==
Ford married television producer, Jon Connerty, on 13 October 2007. She gave birth to a son in 2008.

Ford and Connerty separated in September 2013. She said the separation was "incredibly painful" and that, after seven years of marriage, they will be divorcing. She said, "When Jon and I first parted it was quite hard to put my personal life aside," Ford explained. "But then it became therapeutic to concentrate on my job. People call it 'Doctor Theatre'—when you're acting, you can't worry about things."
