= David Neilson =

British actor

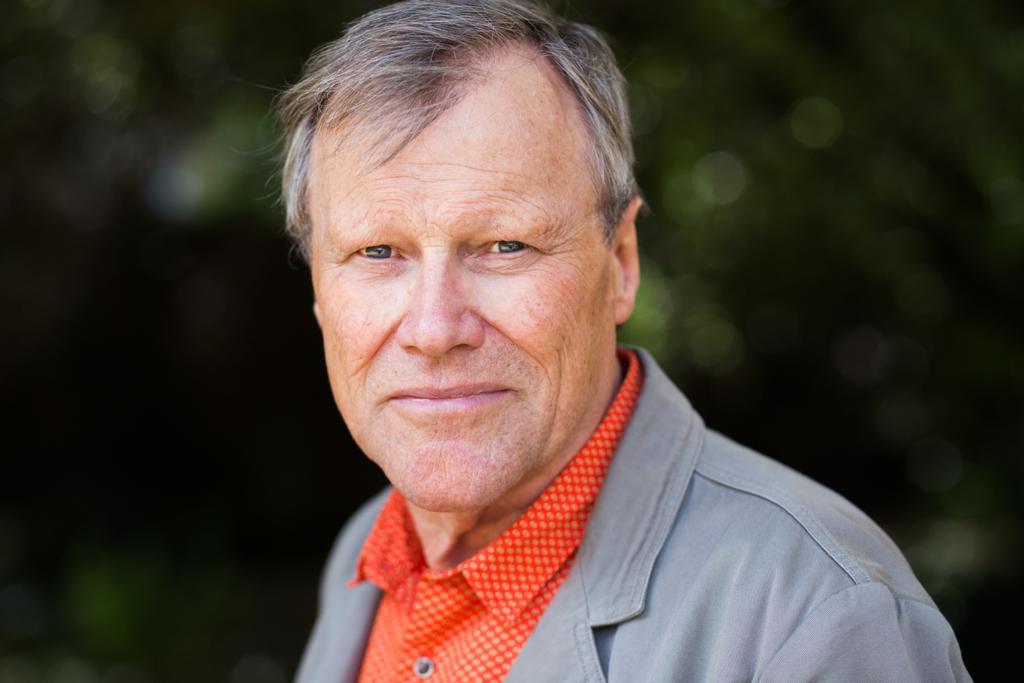
- Neilson in 2016
- Born: 13 March 1949 (age 76); Loughborough, Leicestershire, England
- Occupation: Actor
- Years active: 1975–present
- Known for: Role of Roy Cropper in Coronation Street (1995–present)
- Spouse: Jane Neilson
- Children: 1

David Neilson (born 13 March 1949) is an English actor. He is best known for his role as cafe owner Roy Cropper in the long running ITV soap opera Coronation Street, which he has played since 1995.

== Early life ==
Neilson was born in Loughborough, Leicestershire, and enrolled at the Central School of Speech and Drama at the age of 20. He worked in various jobs at the same time, including as a gas fitter, ice cream salesman and a barman.

== Career ==
His television roles include Z-Cars, Young at Heart, Mike in a single episode of Survivors (BBC), Edgar in DH Lawrence's Sons and Lovers adapted by Trevor Griffiths (BBC), Blue Heaven by Frank Skinner, as Millington in the TV movies of the Charlie Resnick novels, Bergerac, Casualty, Boys from the Blackstuff, Secret Army and Heartbeat. He appeared briefly in EastEnders in the early 1990s, and in a celebrity edition of Stars in Their Eyes as Roy Orbison. He also starred in the British drama Chimera.

In addition he has appeared in two Mike Leigh films: Life Is Sweet and Secrets & Lies. On radio in 2009, Neilson appeared in God Bless Our Love, an uplifting, romantic comedy about a priest and a nun who fall in love and leave their orders to marry and begin a new life together.

== Personal life ==
Neilson is married to Jane and has a son Daniel, and is now grandfather to two children. He is a lifelong Leicester City supporter, regularly running Alan Birchenall's charity race around the King Power Stadium to raise money for awareness for prostate cancer, in memory of former Leicester City player Keith Weller. He is also a Labour Party supporter, supporting the party at the 2011 Oldham East and Saddleworth by-election.

== Awards and nominations ==
Year	Award	Category	Result	Ref.
2004	The British Soap Awards	Best Actor	Nominated	
2004	The British Soap Awards	Best Dramatic Performance	Nominated	
2004	The British Soap Awards	Best On-Screen Partnership (shared with Julie Hesmondhalgh)	Won	
2008	The British Soap Awards	Best On-Screen Partnership (shared with Katherine Kelly)	Nominated	
2011	Inside Soap Awards	Best Wedding (shared with Hesmondhalgh)	Shortlisted	
2013	Inside Soap Awards	Best Actor	Won	
2013	Digital Spy Reader Awards	Best Soap Actor	Won	
2014	19th National Television Awards	Serial Drama Performance	Shortlisted	
2014	The British Soap Awards	Best Actor	Won	
2014	The British Soap Awards	Best Dramatic Performance	Won	
2014	The British Soap Awards	Best On-Screen Partnership (shared with Hesmondhalgh)	Won	
2014	TV Choice Awards	Best Soap Actor	Shortlisted	
2014	Inside Soap Awards	Best Actor	Shortlisted	
2014	Digital Spy Reader Awards	Best Male Soap Actor	Second	
2015	The British Soap Awards	Best Actor	Shortlisted	
2015	Inside Soap Awards	Best Actor	Nominated	
2016	21st National Television Awards	Serial Drama Performance	Nominated	
2016	Inside Soap Awards	Best Actor	Nominated	
2016	Inside Soap Awards	Best Partnership (shared with Melanie Hill)	Nominated	
2021	26th National Television Awards	Serial Drama Performance	Nominated	
2021	TV Choice Awards	Best Soap Actor	Won	
2021	Inside Soap Awards	Best Actor	Won	
2021	Inside Soap Awards	Best Partnership (shared with Mollie Gallagher)	Won	
2021	Digital Spy Reader Awards	Best Actor (Male)	Won	
2022	The British Soap Awards	Best On-Screen Partnership (shared with Gallagher)	Nominated	
2022	Inside Soap Awards	Best Actor	Nominated	
2022	Inside Soap Awards	Best Double Act (shared with Mollie Gallagher)	Nominated	
2023	The British Soap Awards	Best On-Screen Partnership (shared with Maureen Lipman)	Nominated	
