= List of Coronation Street characters introduced in 2013 =

Coronation Street is a British soap opera first broadcast on 9 December 1960. The following is a list of characters that first appeared in 2013, by order of first appearance. All characters were introduced by series producer Phil Collinson or his successor, Stuart Blackburn. Faye Windass' (Ellie Leach) biological father, Tim Metcalfe (Joe Duttine), arrived in January, while Katy Armstrong's (Georgia May Foote) best friend, Steph Britton (Tisha Merry), and Gloria Price's (Sue Johnston) new fiancé, Eric Babbage (Timothy West), made their debuts in February. In April, former Waterloo Road actress Katie McGlynn joined the cast as Beth Tinker's (Lisa George) niece, Sinead. The year's first baby, Jake Windass, son of Gary Windass (Mikey North) and Izzy Armstrong (Cherylee Houston) born out of surrogacy through Tina McIntyre (Michelle Keegan), arrived in May. He was followed by Lily Platt, David (Jack P. Shepherd) and Kylie Platt's (Paula Lane) baby daughter, in August. September saw the arrival of Faye's devious new friend, Grace Piper (Ella-Grace Gregoire). October delivered the introduction of Owen's old acquaintance-turned-business partner Pat Phelan (Connor McIntyre), who would gradually become one of the show's greatest characters and is arguably the most notorious villain in the show's history. Gary's old friend from the army Kal Nazir (Jimi Mistry), Dennis Tanner's (Philip Lowrie) acquaintance Ritchie de Vries (Robin Askwith), Steve McDonald's (Simon Gregson) friend from History class Andrea Beckett (Hayley Tamaddon) and a new love interest for Sophie Webster (Brooke Vincent), Maddie Heath (Amy James-Kelly), made their first appearances in December.

== Tim Metcalfe ==
Tim Metcalfe, played by Joe Duttine, made his first screen appearance on 21 January 2013. Tim is the biological father of Faye Windass (Ellie Leach). The character was revealed to be entering the show in August 2012 by series producer, Phil Collinson. He stated "We know that Faye's mother is dead, but there's a father out there somewhere and he's going to come along and challenge things for Anna." On 13 January 2013, it was announced that Duttine had been cast in the role of Tim.

== Steph Britton ==
Steph Britton
- Coronation Street character
- Portrayed by: Tisha Merry
- Duration: 2013–2018
- First appearance: 18 February 2013
- Last appearance: 7 February 2018
- Introduced by: Phil Collinson (2013); Kate Oates (2018)
In-universe information
- Occupation: Waitress
- Brothers: Luke Britton

Steph Britton, played by Tisha Merry, made her first screen appearance on 18 February 2013. In November 2016, it was announced that Merry would be leaving Coronation Street after nearly four years on the show and quitting the role as Steph. The announcement came a few months after her co-star Oliver Farnworth announced his departure who plays her on-screen boyfriend, Andy Carver, she made her last appearance on 20 January 2017. In December 2017 it was announced that Merry would reprise the role for a handful of episodes in early 2018 and Steph returned from 31 January to 7 February.

Steph arrives in Coronation Street alongside Megan Smithson (Amy Dolan) to visit their friend Katy Armstrong (Georgia May Foote). They meet to discuss Steph's upcoming 18th birthday party at The Bistro. During the party, both Steph and Megan flirt with Ryan Connor (Sol Heras). Steph later "makes a play for Ryan", making Katy jealous. In November 2013, Steph gets a job at the Bistro as a waitress and makes a good impression on Gloria Price (Sue Johnston) and Gail Platt (Helen Worth). In March 2014, Steph's brother Luke (Dean Fagan) arrived on the Street and started working at the garage with Tyrone Dobbs (Alan Halsall).

Steph becomes good friends with her flatmate Tina McIntyre (Michelle Keegan) and serves as a confidante when she is struggling during her affair with Peter Barlow (Chris Gascoyne). Steph tries to convince Tina that Peter isn't worth it but she won't listen. She is devastated when Tina is pushed off a balcony and beaten with a metal pipe by Rob Donovan (Marc Baylis), and visits her in hospital. She is distraught when Tina later dies from her injuries.

At the end of 2014, Steph enters a relationship with Andy Carver, who is pretending to be the son of Michael Rodwell (Les Dennis). She discovers Andy's secret; however, she stands by him and supports him as they both love each other. The real Gavin Rodwell (Mark Holgate) soon arrives in Weatherfield and demands a large amount of money from Andy and Steph for him to keep silent. They raise the cash, but problems later appear when Gavin reveals to Michael's fiancée Gail McIntyre (Helen Worth) that Andy has been lying. Gail becomes embroiled in Andy and Steph's deceit and they are later informed that the real Gavin has died in a car accident. When the lies become too much for Steph and realises that Andy is mainly looking out for himself, she ends their relationship. Later on, when she believes that Andy is leaving Weatherfield, Steph frantically tries to contact him but he turns up at her flat and the pair reconcile.

It was announced on 6 August 2015 that James Atherton had been filming with Coronation Street as the ex-boyfriend of Steph, Jamie. A storyline was then teased as something to affect both Steph and Luke. On 1 October, it was announced that Steph would be involved in a new "shocking" storyline. The storyline saw Jamie manipulate Luke by posting intimate pictures of Steph online, a real-life issue called revenge porn. The storyline began when Luke's girlfriend Maria Connor (Samia Ghadie) puts a stop to his and Jamie's racing car scheme and Luke agrees, angering Jamie. He then takes action and posts the pictures online, which leaves a "devastating effect" on Steph, with her "emotional turmoil set to shock viewers". Coronation Street bosses aimed to reflect that the issue, that was made illegal in early 2015, is still an "ongoing issue in wider society". Jamie was eventually arrested for the revenge porn.

Steph and Andy later move in together and are still together at the start of 2017 whilst Andy has attacked Pat Phelan (Connor McIntyre) in December 2016 for being present at the death of Michael in November. However, in January 2017, Andy admits to Steph that Phelan is blackmailing him and that he has forced him to set Kevin Webster's (Michael Le Vell) garage on fire. He also admits that Phelan has been threatening to harm Steph if he does not co-operate. She and Andy plan to leave for Portugal together to live with Katy, but at the airport he leaves as he has evidence of Phelan admitting to being present when Michael died. However, Phelan supposedly bludgeons Andy to death with the laptop containing the evidence. Phelan then texts Steph on Andy's mobile phone, breaking up with her and Steph leaves for Portugal alone, never knowing Andy's fate. In August 2017, it is shown Andy wasn't killed but has been kept hostage by Phelan. Luke later figures this out in January 2018 and is murdered by Phelan. Steph returns to the street later that month for Luke's funeral and argues with Phelan over him blackmailing Andy. She leaves again the following week.

== Eric Babbage ==
Eric Babbage
- Coronation Street character
- Portrayed by: Timothy West
- First appearance: Episode 8065; 18 February 2013
- Last appearance: Episode 8070; 25 February 2013
- Introduced by: Phil Collinson
In-universe information
- Occupation: Businessman
- Wife: Doris Babbage (until 2013)

Eric Babbage, played by Timothy West, made his first screen appearance on 18 February 2013. The character and West's casting was announced on 18 December 2012. When asked if he had always been interested in appearing in Coronation Street, West replied "Well I thought 'if Ian McKellen can do it then it's good enough for me!" The actor went on to reveal that the role of Eric appealed to him, as he could not stay long term and the story had "a definite end to it".

Marion McMullen from the Coventry Telegraph reported that Eric is a carpet salesman, who will be introduced as Gloria Price's (Sue Johnston) new love interest. West explained that Eric is a lonely man who works in a boring business. He has some money and wants to spend it by going on a round the world trip, with some company. Eric met Gloria on holiday and they got on well, but he has started to realise that she might not be all that she seems. When Eric meets Gloria's family, he finds himself drawn to her granddaughter, Eva (Catherine Tyldesley), because she is unhappy. West said: "He doesn't want to have a sexual relationship with her at all, he is far too old for one thing. But he does think that they might have some fun together seeing the world. She is funny and intelligent. He sees vulnerability in her that others don't, he doesn't really see the harder side of her." Eric offers to take Eva around the world, as he feels that it would benefit the both of them. Eric becomes "something of a father figure" to Eva and she is devastated when he later dies.

Gloria starts planning a lavish funeral for Eric, assuming that he has left her something in his will. Unfortunately, his solicitor arrives with Eric's wife, Doris, and reveals that not only had they never divorced but she would inherit everything as Eric hadn't changed his will. Doris refused to take over the funeral, threatening a pauper's funeral, so Eva shames Gloria into downgrading the plan slightly so they could pay for it between them. Eva sold a necklace that Eric gave her and Gloria sold her engagement ring so they could give him the send-off they felt he deserved.

== Sinead Tinker ==
Sinead Tinker
- Coronation Street character
- Portrayed by: Katie McGlynn
- Duration: 2013–2020
- First appearance: Episode 8107; 19 April 2013
- Last appearance: Episode 10024; 6 March 2020
- Introduced by: Phil Collinson
- Spin-off appearances: Coronation Street: Text Santa Special (2013); What Would Kirk Do? (2014–2015)
In-universe information
- Occupation: Machinist
- Mother: Arlene Tinker
- Sisters: Millie Tinker; Penny Tinker
- Husband: Daniel Osbourne (2018–2019)
- Sons: Bertie Osbourne
- Grandmothers: Nancy Tinker
- Aunts: Beth Tinker
- First cousins: Craig Tinker
- Other relatives: Agnes Tinker

Sinead Osbourne (also Tinker ), played by Katie McGlynn, made her first screen appearance on 19 April 2013. The character and casting was announced on 22 February 2013. Sinead is the niece of established character Beth Tinker (Lisa George). A writer for the serial's official website revealed that Sinead might catch Chesney Brown's (Sam Aston) eye following her arrival. The writer stated "Will new girl Sinead be his light at the end of the tunnel?" In July 2019, it was announced that Sinead would die from cervical cancer, due to McGlynn leaving Coronation Street. She died on 25 October 2019.

Sinead's aunt, Beth, contacts her and asks her to come to Coronation Street for a visit. Beth tries to set Sinead up with Chesney, who has recently broken up with his girlfriend, Katy Armstrong (Georgia May Foote). The pair really hit it off and Sinead agrees to go on another date with Chesney, but when Katy and her lover Ryan Connor (Sol Heras) arrive, Sinead feels that Chesney is using her to get back at Katy. When Katy moves in with Ryan and his family, Chesney acts like he could not care less, but Sinead can see that he is hurt by Katy's actions. Sinead sees through Chesney and realises that he is using her to get back at Katy, which infuriates her. After a talk with her aunt Beth, Sinead understands that she can't let Chesney use her. When Katy and Ryan ask Chesney and Sinead to look after Katy and Chesney's baby son, Joseph, Chesney tells them that they are going out for the night so they can't. But when the couple return home, Chesney reveals that they are not going out, which angers Sinead. They eventually do, with Beth and Kirk, but leave early as Sinead realises that Chesney does not want to be out. She argues with Chesney in the street, and later clashes with Katy, after she tries to give her boyfriend advice. During a date night, Sinead suggests to Chesney that they have sex, but Chesney turns her down. When Chesney reveals that he does not love her, Sinead says she understands. She stays overnight in Chesney's bed, while he sleeps on the sofa. Unhappy with the relationship, Sinead ends it and leaves. When Katy begs Chesney for another chance, Chesney rejects her and calls Sinead. She asks Chesney not to mess her about and they reunite. Sinead is very supportive when Chesney is told that his foster carer Hayley Cropper (Julie Hesmondhalgh) is dying from incurable pancreatic cancer. Sinead also attends Hayley's husband, Roy's (David Neilson), birthday party with Chesney. Sinead gets a job working at Underworld after helping Beth to win an Employee of the Month competition.

It was announced on 30 October 2014 that Coronation Street would air a mini-bus crash, involving the members of Underworld – including Sinead, after Steve McDonald (Simon Gregson) crashes the bus. A show spokesperson commented: "Exact details are being kept under wraps, but more than one character will be hospitalised as a result of the crash and one Underworld knicker stitcher's life will be on the line! Locations for the smash are currently being explored to find a suitably dramatic setting for what promises to be a high octane start to 2015 for Corrie fans." The scenes were filmed on 19 November 2014. The show released more information on the crash aftermath in January 2015. It was revealed that Sinead would be left worst from the crash, with "devastating" effects for her and Chesney. Producer, Stuart Blackburn, said that Sinead would be injured very seriously and that they would be "heartbreaking" scenes airing, "I have been watching some early scenes that have been shot of Katie McGlynn, who plays Sinead, and Sam Aston, who plays Chesney. It is just truly, truly heartbreaking. They have a long way to go. We all know how forgiving Sinead is, but I don't think Chesney is ever going to stop blaming Steve for that." McGlynn later spoke to Digital Spy, revealing Sinead's recovery is a long process and that she will be left wondering if she will walk again.

It was revealed on 6 January 2015 that former Hollyoaks star, Peter Mitchell, would be starring in Coronation Street as a character that one established character – revealed to be Sinead – would meet after the bus crash. Mitchell is disabled and it was thought Sinead would be involved with him after she is made paralysed. Mitchell later spoke to Digital Spy about his new role as patient Sam, who would become friends with Sinead, revealing that he would become an "ally" for Sinead when she is left paralysed. He also praised McGlynn and Aston and commented that they are "brilliant" to work alongside. Sinead's storyline played out onscreen from January until April 2015, with her back to her previous self by May.

In 2016, Sinead starts modelling which is met with criticism by Chesney. In January 2017, Sinead grows bored of Chesney and begins sleeping with Daniel Osbourne (Rob Mallard). Chesney finds out and breaks up with her leading to her moving in with Daniel. After finding out she is pregnant Daniel turns down his Oxford university application causing Daniel's father Ken Barlow's (William Roache) to turn on Sinead which prompts her to have a secret abortion. Due to this Sinead was a major suspect (which was later revealed to be Daniel) in the "Who Attacked Ken?" storyline. Daniel later finds out about this and they split up with Sinead later getting back with Chesney who she becomes engaged to; however, they split on their wedding day after Chesney tells Sinead he does not love her and that he feels like he is just marrying her for a mother for his son Joseph, who returned in October after his real mother, Katy, died in a car accident. Sinead visits Daniel's flat in just lingerie and they have sex, getting back together again. She later gets pregnant and gets engaged to Daniel. However, she starts bleeding, goes for a baby scan and is told she may have cervical cancer, which she does not tell Daniel about. Daniel arranges for them to have a pagan wedding with Kirk officiating. Sinead is then diagnosed with an aggressive form of cervical cancer and is told she will have to terminate her pregnancy if she wants to have radiotherapy. After being told this Sinead says she doesn't want radiotherapy as she wants to keep her baby and breaks down in hospital. She confides in Ken about the cancer after he sees her in hospital.

Sinead eventually tells Daniel about her cancer diagnosis, but she remains adamant that she does not wish to receive treatment until the baby is born. Sinead eventually gives birth to a boy called Bertie, to which Sinead finally begins treatment for her cancer. The treatment works and the cancer goes into remission. Happy to have a new lease on life, Sinead decides she wants to leave the Street and live somewhere new with Daniel and Bertie. They agree to do this when an opportunity arises, and they decide to have a larger wedding reception to make up for the smaller one that was postponed. During the reception, Sinead discovers another lump, and upon returning to the hospital, she learns the cancer has recurred and is now terminal, with Sinead being given a months, if not weeks, left to live.

Although devastated, Sinead decides to settle loose ends, such as reconnecting with family she lost contact with, and ensuring with Carla that the money Underworld made using Sinead's formula of beard oils is placed into a trust fund for Bertie for when he is older. In the following weeks, Sinead's health deteriorates, with family and friends visiting her on her deathbed in home to say their last goodbyes. When alone with Daniel, she tells him not to spend the rest of his life mourning her and says he will always have her blessing for whatever relationship he may enter once she is gone. When Daniel goes to put Bertie to bed, he returns to discover Sinead has peacefully died in her sleep. Her funeral takes place the following weeks, with many in the Street attending or paying their respects.

In May 2017, Laura-Jayne Tyler from Inside Soap called Sinead's relationship with Chesney a "snore-fest" and asked Coronation Street to "put us out of our misery" and end their relationship "for the love of all that is good in this world".

== Jake Windass ==
Jake Windass
- Coronation Street character
- Portrayed by: Harley and Layton Phoenix (2013–2015); Seth and Theo Wild (2016–2018); Bobby Bradshaw (2018–present)
- Duration: 2013–2019, 2021-present
- First appearance: Episode 8135; 27 May 2013
- Introduced by: Stuart Blackburn
In-universe information
- Father: Gary Windass
- Mother: Izzy Armstrong
- Stepmother: Maria Connor
- Half-brothers: Zack Rubinstein
- Grandfathers: Owen Armstrong; Eddie Windass
- Grandmothers: Linda Hancock; Anna Windass
- Aunts: Katy Armstrong; Faye Windass (adoptive)
- First cousins: Joseph Brown; Miley Hodge (adoptive)

Jake Windass played by Harley and Layton Phoenix from 2013 to 2015, Seth and Theo Wild from 2016 to 2018, and Bobby Bradshaw since August 2018, is the son of established characters Gary Windass (Mikey North) and Izzy Armstrong (Cherylee Houston). He made his first screen appearance on 27 May 2013. On 23 April 2013, Peter Dyke and Katie Begley from the Daily Star reported that Tina McIntyre (Michelle Keegan), who was acting as Gary and Izzy's surrogate, would give birth to a boy two months early in The Rovers. Gary and Izzy decide to name the baby Jake. Their son is forced to stay in hospital because of his small size.

After suffering a miscarriage, Izzy approaches her sister Katy (Georgia May Foote) to carry a baby for her, as Izzy worries that, because of her disability, the pregnancy will be a struggle for herself and the baby. As the plans progress, Katy backs out and Tina offers to be their surrogate instead, after Izzy's father Owen Armstrong (Ian Puleston-Davies) offers to pay her for doing so. During the pregnancy, Izzy feels left out, while Gary became infatuated with Tina and tries to kiss her. When Tina eventually tells Izzy what happened, the resulting argument and stress causes Tina goes into labour two months early. She gives birth to a boy in May 2013, with Izzy and her ex-boyfriend Tommy Duckworth (Chris Fountain) by her side. Gary and Izzy decide to name their son Jake. Jake develops an infection in his intestine and undergoes surgery, which is successful. Tina later announces that she is keeping Jake and decides to rename him Joe, after her father Joe McIntyre. When Izzy decides to give up the fight for Jake, Tina realises how much she and Gary love him. She then gives Jake back to them.

In late 2023, Jake learns that his stepbrother Liam Connor Jr (Charlie Wrenshall) was threatened with a knife by a boy at Weatherfield High called Mason Radcliffe (Luca Toolan). Jake reports this to the police. However, by the time the police find Mason, he had given the knife to Dylan Wilson (Liam McCheyne) to hide. In January 2024, after Mason steals Liam's phone, he messages Jake on his PlayStation 4 to tell him to tell Liam to meet him at school if he wants the phone back. After hearing from Liam that Mason was bullying another boy at school, Jake decides to tell Gary and stepmother Maria Connor (Samia Longchambon) about Mason threatening Liam with the knife.

In 2021, Laura-Jayne Tyler from Inside Soap wrote that Jake "has the sort of energy we associate with young David Platt (Jack P. Shepherd) circa 2021. Kid's got game."

== Lily Platt ==
Lily Platt
- Coronation Street character
- Portrayed by: Ava & Lily (2013–2014); Betsie & Emmie Taylor (2014–2016); Brooke Malonie (2016–2025); Grace Ashcroft-Gardner (2025–present)
- Duration: 2013–present
- First appearance: Episode 8200; 26 August 2013
- Introduced by: Stuart Blackburn
In-universe information
- Father: David Platt
- Mother: Kylie Platt
- Stepmother: Shona Platt
- Half-brothers: Max Turner
- Half-sisters: Harper Platt
- Grandfathers: Martin Platt
- Grandmothers: Gail Platt
- Uncles: Nick Tilsley
- Aunts: Becky McDonald; Sarah Platt; Charlotte Platt
- First cousins: Bethany Platt; Harry Platt; Sam Blakeman
- Other relatives: Audrey Roberts; Stephen Reid; George Shuttleworth

Lily Platt is the daughter of established characters David (Jack P. Shepherd) and Kylie Platt (Paula Lane), played by twins Ava and Lily from 2013 to 2014, Betsie and Emmie Taylor from 2014 to 2016 and Brooke Malonie since June 2016. She made her first onscreen appearance on 26 August 2013. That same month, actress Michelle Keegan, who played Tina McIntyre, accidentally posted copies of a future script, which revealed Lily's father to be David. Lane said she was enjoying working with the babies who play Lily, calling them "lovely". She explained "They're still really small so you've got to be really careful with them, because they're so delicate. But they're very well-behaved and one of the babies actually had a close-up shot the other day where she suddenly opened her eyes. I think we've got a natural there." In July 2025, it was reported that the role of Lily had been recast to Grace Ashcroft-Gardner, who made her first appearance on 14 July of that year.

Kylie has a one-night stand with David's brother Nick Tilsley (Ben Price) on Christmas Day 2012. She finds out she is pregnant in January 2013 and is unsure whether the father is Nick or David. David later discovers Kylie and Nick's fling after overhearing Kylie talk about the affair to his mother Gail McIntyre (Helen Worth) and realises that the baby may not be his. In August 2013, Kylie goes into labour at home and is found by Sean Tully (Antony Cotton). Gail arrives and helps Kylie deliver a daughter, who is named Lily. Nick is in hospital in a coma, after being injured in a van accident caused by David, at the time of Lily's birth. After Nick regains consciousness and finds out about the birth and wanting to know whether or not he is father, he tells David to get a DNA test on Lily. David is relieved when the test results reveal that Lily is his daughter. In November 2013, on the day of Lily's christening, David's responsibility for Nick's accident and the previous hate campaign against him, are revealed and Kylie tells David to stay away from Lily. Kylie then decides to raise Lily by herself with Gail's help.

In January 2014, Kylie gets drunk and falls asleep whilst cooking, putting her son Max Turner (Harry McDermott) and Lily at risk. David breaks into the house and turns the oven off. He rows with Kylie for putting Max and Lily's lives at risk but comforts her when she breaks down in tears, but they make amends. David throws Kylie out on Christmas Day 2014 when he discovers that she has been taking drugs. Kylie returns in May 2015 and eventually reconciles with David. In July 2016, Kylie is stabbed and killed while defending her friend Gemma Winter (Dolly-Rose Campbell) and David tells Max and Lily that Kylie has died. In October 2016, David, determined to get revenge on Kylie's killer Clayton Hibbs (Callum Harrison), plans to kill himself and Clayton and leaves Max and Lily a suicide video message. David escapes from the Bistro's cellar after being locked in by Gail, Nick and his sister Sarah Platt (Tina O'Brien) to prevent him going through with his plans. David almost hits Lily in his car and she and Gary Windass (Mikey North) are trapped by David's car when it flips. The residents work together and lift the car and free Gary and Lily.

== Grace Piper ==
Grace Piper
- Coronation Street character
- Portrayed by: Ella-Grace Gregoire
- First appearance: Episode 8212; 13 September 2013
- Last appearance: Episode 8266; 27 November 2013
- Introduced by: Stuart Blackburn
In-universe information
- Occupation: Student

Grace Piper, played by Ella-Grace Gregoire, made her first screen appearance on 13 September 2013. The character and casting was announced on 22 August 2013. Gregoire successfully auditioned for the role after she was talent spotted at the Scream Theatre School in Blackpool. Of her casting, Gregoire commented "I couldn't believe it when I got the part. Now I am mixing with all the other actors who I have been watching for years."

Grace is introduced as a friend of Faye Windass (Ellie Leach). She was described as a "troublesome teenager" by David Sharman from the Blackpool Gazette, while a writer for the Scream Theatre School called her "manipulative" and said she would cause "mayhem". A Coronation Street spokesperson stated that Grace would come across as being lovely at first, but she soon wraps the adults round her finger and starts causing trouble. Faye's mother, Anna Windass (Debbie Rush), is "instantly wary" of Grace and believes she is up to no good. The spokesperson added that it is not long before Grace gets Faye into trouble.

Grace is first seen at Faye's house. Despite coming across as charming and polite, she later tells Faye she will be able to get what she wants by being nice to Anna. When Faye tells her she doesn't like her father Tim Metcalfe's (Joe Duttine) girlfriend, Sally Webster (Sally Dynevor), she steals £5 to make it look like Sally has not paid Anna at the café. She later puts the money back and tells Anna she saw Sally drop the money, forcing Sally to apologise. Grace continues to cause trouble for Sally when she tells Faye to tell her dad that she left them on their own, despite the fact that she was the one who asked Sally to get them some sweets. This results in an argument between Sally and Tim.

Although Grace continues to charm Anna, Owen Armstrong (Ian Puleston-Davies) and Sally begin to suspect that she is a bad influence on Faye. Their fears are confirmed when Grace and Faye throw stones at Mary Taylor's (Patti Clare) motor home. The two girls deny the incident, although Owen assures Mary he knows what is going on. Grace then manipulates Faye into throwing a Halloween party and uses the opportunity to annoy Nick Tilsley (Ben Price) by turning up the music. Nick, who had recently suffered brain damage, ends up shouting and having a breakdown. Grace then convinces Faye to again throw stones at Mary's camper van.

When Tracy Barlow (Kate Ford) asks Faye to walk her dog, Grace uses the situation to bully Simon Barlow (Alex Bain). After smashing a pot at the house, she then tells Faye to put Simon into one of Amy Barlow's dresses and films it. She then threatens Amy and Simon not to tell anybody what has happened, although Simon tells his stepmother Leanne Tilsley (Jane Danson). Although Faye and Grace deny any wrongdoing, a video late emerges and both girls are reported to the police. Grace's mother remains uninterested after hearing about what has happened, and blames Faye. At the police station, Faye finally admits Grace was the one who was in control of the situation and she has been threatening her to misbehave. Grace is later seen at the police station with her mother.

== Valerie Phelan ==
Valerie Phelan
- Coronation Street character
- Portrayed by: Caroline Berry
- Duration: 2013–2014
- First appearance: Episode 8226; 2 October 2013
- Last appearance: Episode 8358; 4 April 2014
- Introduced by: Stuart Blackburn
In-universe information
- Occupation: Nail technician

Valerie Phelan, played by Caroline Berry, first appeared on 2 October 2013 and made her last appearance on 4 April 2014.

She is a nail technician and the wife of Pat Phelan (Connor McIntyre), who assumes control of his assets due to her husband's apparent issue with bankruptcy. Valerie is aware of Phelan's infidelity and yet she continues to remain with her husband and support him. This is first evident when Valerie receives an unexpected visit from Phelan's old acquaintance, Owen Armstrong (Ian Puleston-Davies) – who is looking to find Phelan in order to claim payment for work he had done for him. However, Valerie refuses to divulge Phelan's whereabouts and reveals Owen's situation. Owen then steals Phelan's motorcycle in retaliation and Phelan pays up. He later plots revenge and forges a business partnership with Owen for a flat conversion project, up to the point where Valerie joins her husband in spending quality time with Owen and his soon-to-be-stepfamily that consist of his lover Anna Windass (Debbie Rush).

During that time, Valerie is unaware of Phelan's plan and is kept in the dark when his attempt to rape Anna leads to a conversation with her son Gary (Mikey North) – who ends up knocking Phelan unconscious with a plank of wood. Later on, Valerie confronts Owen and Gary to demand Phelan's whereabouts upon finding out that he missed their special wedding anniversary plans – though neither claim to know where he is. After it transpires that Phelan had survived the confrontation, he proceeds to blackmail Owen and Gary into working for him under no payment by threatening to report Gary's assault on him – which CCTV footage had caught – to the police. Anna later invites Valerie to her house to explain the situation that her son and lover are going through with Phelan. However, Valerie refuses to believe Anna over Phelan and is promptly kicked out of her house. This is the last time she appears, as she is never seen again from then onwards. It is later implied, however, that Valerie had discovered Phelan's plan and how in contributed to what he did to Anna; blackmailing her into sleeping with him in exchange for Owen and Gary being released from his contract. Phelan confirms this by telling Anna how Valerie divorced him and kept all of his assets, thus leaving him penniless.

== Pat Phelan ==
Pat Phelan, played by Connor McIntyre, is an illegitimate businessman and career con-artist who would later become the landlord of Weatherfield throughout his two-stint duration on the show. He debuted on 2 October 2013 and originally left the series on 14 April 2014, before returning as the show's primary antagonist until the character was killed off on 1 June 2018.

During his time on the programme, Phelan develops a longstanding rivalry with established characters Anna Windass (Debbie Rush) and her son Gary (Mikey North) after he blackmailed the pair in the midst of forging his business partnership with Anna's boyfriend and Gary's employer Owen Armstrong (Ian Puleston-Davies). This occurred after Phelan, seeking revenge against Owen for stealing his back in a bid to have Phelan repay the £4,000 he owed him, tricked Gary into attacking him on CCTV footage; extracted Owen's £80,000 investment before arranging for him to be removed from the council's contractors list of approved builders; and raped Anna by coercing her into sleeping with him in exchanging for relinquishing his blackmailing of Owen and Gary in retaliation for the latter's assault incident. This ultimately sparked the end of Phelan's marriage with his first wife Valerie (Caroline Berry), though he later marries Anna and Gary's next-door neighbour Eileen Grimshaw (Sue Cleaver).

The character proceeded to manipulate Eileen's son Jason (Ryan Thomas) into leaving the street after sabotaging his business empire; used Jason's inheritance from his late father, Tony Stewart (Terence Maynard), to set-up his fraudulent properly scheme called "Calcutta Street"; defrauded Gary's girlfriend Sarah Platt (Tina O'Brien) and most of their fellow residents, including local shopkeeper Rita Sullivan (Barbara Knox) and her friend Yasmeen Nazir (Shelley King), into investing their own money onto his properly scam; caused the death of his love rival Michael Rodwell (Les Dennis) by watching him die of a heart attack without providing help; locked Michael's surrogate son, Andy Carver (Oliver Farnworth), in a cellar for ten months after blackmailing the latter and appearing to have killed Andy on his own wedding day; became a prime suspect of causing the series' longest-serving character, Ken Barlow (William Roache), to fall down the stairs; reconciled with his long-lost daughter, Nicola Rubinstein (Nicola Thorp), until she discovers that he allegedly raped her mother Annabel just nine months before she herself was born; kidnapped his ex-partner-in-crime Vinny Ashford (Ian Kelsey) and forced Andy to murder him with a gun, before shooting Andy dead himself; killed Andy's best friend Luke Britton (Dean Fagan) from growing unknowingly close to uncovering his friend's fate; forced Andy's girlfriend and Luke's sister Steph (Tisha Merry) into absconding Weatherfield so he cover-up his murders; and framed Anna for pushing his apprentice Seb Franklin (Harry Visinoni) off a ladder in retribution for turning Nicola against him, which resulted in her four-month imprisonment.

Eventually, Phelan's crimes were exposed on 30 March 2018 after Eileen receives information about this from her colleague Tim Metcalfe (Joe Duttine) during the couple's holiday. This subsequently led to Eileen kicking Phelan to the sea after he attempts to snatch his getaway boat keys from her. Though he is later presumed dead in Weatherfield on the day his crimes become public knowledge, Phelan is revealed to have survived the fall on 2 April 2018; with the character recuperating from his injuries in a B&B in Ireland. He then returned for the end-of-May special episodes which were broadcast post-watershed and concluded his story arc, wherein Phelan attempted to flee Weatherfield with his grandson Zack on the day Andy's boss Robert Preston (Tristan Gemmill) was due to marry his fiancé and restaurant colleague Michelle Connor (Kym Marsh). This triggered a siege where Phelan ends up shooting both his daughter Nicola and then bride-to-be Michelle, shortly before Anna returns from her false imprisonment and mortally stabs her tormenting rapist to stop him from escaping once more. This ultimately concluded the character's story arc as Phelan thereupon died, while both Nicola and Michelle survive from their gunshot impacts, and his body is later taken away in a private ambulance.

Upon his return in 2016, Phelan has been conceived as one of the best villains in soap history.

== Kal Nazir ==
Kal Nazir
- Coronation Street character
- Portrayed by: Jimi Mistry
- Duration: 2013–2015
- First appearance: Episode 8274; 8 December 2013
- Last appearance: Episode 8649; 28 May 2015
- Introduced by: Stuart Blackburn
In-universe information
- Occupation: Soldier (2008–2010); Personal trainer (2009–2015); Businessman (2008–2015)
- Father: Sharif Nazir
- Mother: Yasmeen Nazir
- Half-brothers: Idris Nazir
- Wife: Jamila Nazir (backstory)
- Sons: Zeedan Nazir
- Daughters: Alya Nazir

Khalid "Kal" Nazir, played by Jimi Mistry, made his first screen appearance on 8 December 2013. The character and Mistry's casting was announced on 2 July 2013. The actor began filming his scenes in September. Of Mistry's casting, series producer Stuart Blackburn commented "I'm thrilled to welcome Jimi to Coronation Street. With credits that include East Is East, The Guru and Blood Diamond, getting him on board is a real coup. Jimi's character is going to have a swift impact on the lives of many in Weatherfield."

Khalid, better known as "Kal", was an old army friend of Gary Windass (Mikey North); who worked as a personal trainer. Daniel Kilkelly from Digital Spy reported that Kal will "set tongues wagging and pulses racing" when he arrives. The character has been called "charming" and "roguish". While his wandering eye may cause some upset with certain male residents.

On 17 March 2015, it was announced that Mistry would be leaving Coronation Street as part of a dramatic storyline later in the year. Of his exit, Mistry stated "When I was told about this storyline I felt it was a brilliant way to say goodbye to Kal and I am really looking forward to filming my departure scenes. I have had a fantastic 18 months on Coronation Street but I never saw myself staying around forever, my life is in London and I enjoy playing a variety of roles." Kal died in a fire at the Victoria Court flats on 28 May 2015, with Mistry describing his final scenes as "fantastic", "I was really pleased when I got the scripts because it's the biggest fire the show has had. It's a very busy week on TV for it as well – it will get some good viewing figures hopefully!" Mistry also said how he has enjoyed himself in his time on the show, "I've said on record before that the Corrie family is a very special one. Everyone makes you feel welcome. It's a really good feeling and a really good atmosphere. It's just great working there. They've got a really good ship going – really tight and they're producing some great work." The episode was watched by 8.4 million viewers on the night of its broadcast, the highest rating the show had seen since the minibus crash in January 2015 as well as the most-watched programme of that day. The Victoria Court fire and the twist that saw Kal and Maddie Heath (Amy James-Kelly) die received a nomination on the Inside Soap Awards 2015 longlist, with the latter receiving a nomination on the shortlist as well.

It was announced that Kal's death would result in a child-parent violence storyline between Leanne Battersby (Jane Danson) and her stepson Simon Barlow (Alex Bain) as Simon begins being violent towards Leanne. Producer Stuart Blackburn said: "Simon's been through so much, with losing Kal, it's another male figure in his life who's gone. Simon is going to take it really, really hard." Blackburn also revealed that Kal's family would not be leaving following his exit and that they would continue appearing. Sair Khan (who plays Kal's daughter Alya) revealed that Alya would "lose control" and not cope following Kal's death, "I think the grief is too much for Alya, so she doesn't deal with it in the way she expects to. She can't be there for her family in the way that she wants to be there."

When Gary hears Dev Alahan (Jimmi Harkishin) complaining about being unfit, he tells him about his friend Kal, who is a personal trainer. Although Dev rejects the idea, Gary arranges a meeting with Kal anyway. After talking things over, Dev accepts Kal's help. Kal tells Dev that he also has two children and that his wife has died. Kal meets Nick Tilsley (Ben Price) in the bistro and offers to help him get into shape after his recent brain injury. Nick angrily rejects Kal's offer, but later asks for his help and Kal agrees to take him on. Kal and Dev discuss the idea of opening a gym and later look at a property on Victoria Street. It also becomes clear that Stella fancies Kal, although Dev also expresses an interest in her.

Kal begins to develop feelings for Leanne, Nick's wife from whom he is separated, who initially turns down his advances as she believes that starting a relationship would hurt Nick, especially in his mental state. Kal's father Sharif (Marc Anwar) notices Kal's feelings for Leanne and quizzes her half-sister Eva Price (Catherine Tyldesley), who reveals to him that Leanne is an ex-prostitute. Sharif warns Kal that he should not move on quickly, for the sake of his children, who are still grieving over their deceased mother. Kal denies that he has any feelings for Leanne. Leanne's feelings for Kal grow over time, with them kissing after he steps in as a topless waiter in the Bistro. However, Nick professes to Leanne that he still loves her and later hugs her in the street, which Kal sees. Soon after, in the gym, Nick tells Kal that Leanne has given him another chance, leaving him devastated. However, in the Bistro, Leanne tells Kal that she only said she would give him another chance because she felt it would break his heart if she didn't. Sharif double-books Nick and Steve McDonald (Simon Gregson), who is training for a charity fun run, so Nick and Steve decide to train with Kal together. Overcome with jealousy, Kal begins to overwork Nick. Whilst boxing with pads as part of their training, Kal pushes Nick so hard that he loses his temper, shouts at him and inadvertently punches Steve in the face. He later apologises to Nick's mother Gail, who is furious with Kal as being pushed to the limit will make Nick's mental state deteriorate again. Nick asks Leanne to have dinner with him at the Bistro on their night out to test new food. But, worried that Nick will get the wrong idea, Leanne asks Eva to come as well. Nick, still unaware that he fancies Leanne, asks Kal to the dinner as well. After the dinner, Kal goes to Leanne's flat where they kiss. When Tina is found on the street after her attempted murder, Leanne tells Nick that she was alone. But later, Kal mentions to Nick that he was with Leanne and so Nick asks if they are seeing each other. Kal tells him that they are. Nick is livid and later storms round to Leanne and Eva's flat to tell Leanne that she is sacked from the Bistro.

In 2015, Kal gives Simon advice on asking a girl for a dance at a wedding. Sometime later, Kal and Leanne save Amy Barlow (Elle Mulvaney) from a fire at Victoria Court. Kal proposes to Leanne at the last minute and she accepts, moments before he dies in an explosion.

== Ritchie de Vries ==
Ritchie de Vries
- Coronation Street character
- Portrayed by: Robin Askwith
- Duration: 2013–2014
- First appearance: Episode 8276; 11 December 2013
- Last appearance: Episode 8325; 17 February 2014
- Introduced by: Stuart Blackburn
In-universe information
- Occupation: Singer

Ritchie de Vries, real name Rodney Purvis, played by Robin Askwith, made his first screen appearance on 11 December 2013. The character and Askwith's casting was announced on 30 September 2013. The actor began filming his first scenes the day of the casting announcement. Ritchie is a "veteran rocker" and close friend of Dennis Tanner (Philip Lowrie). Dennis used to represent Ritchie "at the height of his fame". When Dennis meets up with Ritchie, he realises how much he loved the music industry and decides to become Ritchie's manager again. However, it soon becomes clear that the business arrangement means nothing to Ritchie, who starts to treat Dennis as more of a roadie.

== Andrea Beckett ==
Andrea Beckett
- Coronation Street character
- Portrayed by: Hayley Tamaddon
- Duration: 2013–2015
- First appearance: Episode 8285; 23 December 2013
- Last appearance: Episode 8742; 25 September 2015
- Introduced by: Stuart Blackburn
In-universe information
- Occupation: History student Hotel manager
- Father: Roger
- Husband: Neil Beckett (until 2014)
- Daughters: Jess Beckett

Andrea Beckett, played by Hayley Tamaddon, made her first screen appearance on 23 December 2013. The character and Tamaddon's casting was announced on 4 October 2013. Series producer, Stuart Blackburn, commented "I'm absolutely delighted to welcome Hayley to the show. She's a great actress who I know is going to bring plenty of drama to the famous cobbles of Weatherfield." Andrea is a classmate of Steve McDonald's (Simon Gregson), who decides to go back to school. Andrea and Steve become friends and she will "cause a stir" as Steve's girlfriend Michelle Connor (Kym Marsh) becomes suspicious of their friendship. Tamaddon said Andrea is a ladette, who enjoys drinking beer and playing darts.

On 28 April 2015, it was announced that Tamaddon had been axed from the show, and would in September as part of the upcoming live episode to celebrate ITV's 60th anniversary. It was stated that the character would not be killed off and could return. Speaking of her departure, Tamaddon said: "I came into Corrie for 3 months and have stayed for 2 years! I will be so sad to leave, I have had the best two years of my life here, it really is one big family. Everyone looks out for each other and I've made some incredible friends. I am excited about my exit storyline and the fact that it is part of the live episode." Show producer Stuart Blackburn commented: "Hayley has brought real magic to the Corrie cobbles – funny, energetic, totally professional and a joy to be around." It was announced days later that Craig Charles (who plays Andrea's partner Lloyd Mullaney) would also be leaving. The live episode heavily featured Lloyd and Andrea, as they said goodbye to the Street. Andrea and Lloyd made one further appearance on 25 September when they returned to say a final goodbye with Steve, who was unable to attend the party, leaving viewers in confusion as they had appeared to leave during the live episode. The live episode, including the leaving party, was watched by 8.1 million viewers on the night of its broadcast, the highest rating since the Victoria Court fire in May 2015. The episode in which Lloyd and Andrea say their final goodbye to Steve, was watched by 6.9 million viewers on the night of its broadcast.

Andrea is mentioned by Steve several times before her first appearance, causing anxiety to Michelle. When Andrea arrives at the Rovers, Michelle realises Steve has lied about her not being attractive and takes an instant dislike to her. After Steve gives Michelle her Christmas present, she later overhears Lloyd and Steve talking and learns Andrea helped Steve to choose it. Andrea tells Lloyd she has a teenage son, and he decides to ask her out. Steve refuses to give Lloyd her phone number, but Andrea overhears and gives Lloyd the number herself. When Steve finds out that Lloyd and Andrea have begun, he feels left out. Andrea thinks this gives her a chance of getting Steve in the future, unaware that he only sees her as a friend. She asks Steve to help him with a project, but when she asks Steve to sit closer so he can see her laptop screen, he wrongly believes she is coming on to him and she leaves. Steve later apologises they begin the project again. Whilst working on their project, Steve goes out to get kebabs and, on his return, he finds her asleep. A sleepy Andrea mistakes Steve for Lloyd and pulls him close to her, causing her to fall on him and cover them both in kebab, as Michelle enters.

Lloyd offers Andrea a meal at the Bistro one evening, but Andrea needs to be at home to welcome her husband Neil (William Travis), who is due to return from working on an oil rig in Nigeria. They agree to go for a meal earlier, but she gets angry when Lloyd tries to persuade her to stay, and storms out of the Bistro. Lloyd then leaves her a phone message, but she unplugs the phone as her husband returns and pretends it is broken to stop him finding out about Lloyd. Andrea confides in Michelle that she plans to split from Neil. |s Andrea dumps Neil and moves into Lloyd's with her luggage, he realises she was not serious about him and throws her bags out of the door. Steve consoles Andrea, causing Neil to think she was cheating with Steve. When he finds out that Andrea is in a relationship with Lloyd, Neil finds it difficult to accept and climbs onto the roof of the pub. Andrea puts herself in danger while trying to talk him down. Neil and Andrea after a while return to safety. Neil finally accepts that Andrea and Lloyd are in a relationship, but tells Andrea and Lloyd that he will not sever his ties with Andrea, because of Jess.

Andrea and Lloyd split and she departs, but returns pregnant. Eileen Grimshaw (Sue Cleaver), Steve and Lloyd's friend, is the first to find out. Lloyd is now dating Steve's mother, Liz McDonald (Beverley Callard), but ends things with Liz when Andrea returns and falls out with Steve. Andrea tells Lloyd she has been offered a job in Jersey, and they agree to go there. Steve and Lloyd make up when Michelle and Andrea lock them in the cellar. Steve is too drunk to join in the leaving party celebrations. After saying goodbye to Michelle, Liz and Eileen, Lloyd and Andrea leave and let go of balloons as the car drives off. They return a few days later in order to say goodbye to Steve.

== Maddie Heath ==
Maddie Heath
- Coronation Street character
- Portrayed by: Amy James-Kelly
- Duration: 2013–2015
- First appearance: Episode 8286; 25 December 2013
- Last appearance: Episode 8652; 1 June 2015
- Introduced by: Stuart Blackburn
In-universe information
- Occupation: Car valet Factory packer
- Mother: Fran Heath
- Brothers: Ben Heath

Maddie Ivy Heath, played by Amy James-Kelly, made her first screen appearance on 25 December 2013. Maddie was introduced as a love interest for Sophie Webster (Brooke Vincent). Maddie is homeless and she and Sophie meet at a soup kitchen. Sophie's mother, Sally (Sally Dynevor), will "take an instant disliking" to Maddie. Vincent commented "Maddie shakes things up, she's very much a Kylie Platt (Paula Lane) or Becky McDonald (Katherine Kelly) character but a lot worse. She's very demanding and hard to read – you're intrigued by her. I think she's a good match for Sophie, who stands her ground with her." David Brown from the Radio Times praised the character, saying "It seems to me that Maddie is fast turning into this season's Becky Granger. Which isn't a bad thing – actress Amy Kelly does have the convincing feel of a Katherine Kelly about her." On 15 June 2014, it was revealed that Kelly had signed a new contract that would see her stay on the show for another year. Kelly was originally only meant to stay on the show for a short time, but following after the producers promise to keep Maddie on the show as long as he was executive producer, she was offered a longer stay.

Maddie is first seen at the homeless shelter on Christmas Day. After Sally makes a comment about her having bad manners, she pushes her face into a trifle. When Sally notices her handbag has gone missing, she blames Maddie, although she denies any knowledge of it. Sally is upset when she finds out her watch was left in her stolen handbag, and so Sophie asks Maddie for it back. Maddie asks for fifty pounds in response, but Sophie tricks her and refuses to pay her the money. Furious, Maddie breaks into the Webster's house and steals the watch back. When Sophie confronts her again, Maddie reveals her mother is mentally ill and she has a younger brother, Ben. Maddie later kisses Sophie. Sophie invites Maddie back to her house for dinner on her birthday, but she later leaves after Sally offends her.

Maddie is later offered a job at the local factory, Underworld, when the boss Carla Connor (Alison King) is impressed by Maddie's determination to save Deirdre Barlow's (Anne Kirkbride) missing dog, Eccles. Carla is furious, however, that Maddie and Sophie stole her brand new expensive car in order to do so. In early in the year. Maddie accompanies the Underworld staff to an awards' ceremony, but a group of boy racers drive dangerously in front of the minibus, causing the driver Steve McDonald (Simon Gregson) to swerve and the vehicle to flip over dramatically and to balance precariously on the edge of a quarry. Maddie is one of the later people to regain consciousness, and helps free Tracy Barlow (Kate Ford), Michelle Connor (Kym Marsh) and Alya Nazir (Sair Khan) from the wreckage. She and Julie Carp (Katy Cavanagh) then re-enter the wreckage to save Sally, Sinead Tinker (Katie McGlynn) and Kirk Sutherland (Andrew Whyment). They are successful, and Maddie reveals to Julie that her middle name is Ivy in an attempt to take their minds off the traumatic situation. Maddie volunteers to go back into the wreckage again when the staff realise that Carla is still trapped inside, but it is Tracy who risks her life to save the factory boss. Carla is saved, but Tracy nearly dies when the minibus begins to slide off the edge of the quarry. Tracy leaps out at the last second.

Maddie is thrilled for Sophie's father, Kevin Webster (Michael Le Vell) when he begins a relationship with Jenny Bradley (Sally Ann Matthews). However, when Sophie learns about how Jenny conned her former foster mother Rita Tanner (Barbara Knox) when she lived in Weatherfield 21 years previously, she begins acting very cold towards Jenny. Maddie tries her best to understand Sophie's hatred towards Jenny; however, she fails to and this puts a strain on their relationship. In May 2015, Maddie tries to help when a fire breaks out at the Victoria Court flats, and rushes back home to reveal the horrific events to Jenny. To her surprise, she witnesses Jenny wearing a wig and packing Kevin's young son Jack's belongings. She soon realises that Jenny is going to abduct Jack, and as she tries to call the police, Jenny violently pushes her to the floor, angrily demanding for Maddie to stay. Maddie knees Jenny in the stomach in order to escape, and rushes back over to the Victoria Court flats to tell Sophie that she was right all along about Jenny. However, as she passes through the police tape, an explosion at the building yard caused by a piece of burning wood from the fire occurs, sending Maddie flying across the street. Paramedics quickly respond, and it takes them a long time to find Maddie's pulse. A couple of days later, Maddie passes away with Sophie, Sally and Kevin by her side, to the secret relief of Jenny.

== Others ==
Character	Date(s)	Actor	Circumstances
Mr Benedict	15 February	Kevin Pallister	Mr Benedict manages a local casino. He is confronted by Roy Cropper (David Neilson) whose mother, Sylvia (Stephanie Cole), gambled in the casino and lost a large amount of money. Sylvia and Roy return to the casino, with Ken Barlow (William Roache) and Dennis Tanner (Philip Lowrie). Roy manages to win back his mother's money, which irritates Mr Benedict. However, he later congratulates Roy as he collects his winnings.
Megan Smithson	18 February-?	Amy Dolan	Megan is a friend of Katy Armstrong (Georgia May Foote) and Steph Britton (Tisha Merry). They meet up to discuss Steph's upcoming 18th birthday party at the Bistro. During the party, both Steph and Megan flirt with Ryan Connor (Sol Heras).
Doris Babbage	1 March	Helen Fraser	Doris is Eric Babbage's (Timothy West) wife. She comes to The Rovers Return Inn to meet Gloria Price (Sue Johnston), Eric's fiancée. Doris reveals that Eric's will stipulates that she gets his entire estate.
Toni Griffiths	6–20 March	Tara Moran	Toni is Paul Kershaw's (Tony Hirst) colleague, who helps him with his proposal to Eileen Grimshaw (Sue Cleaver). Toni later organises a charity event featuring the local men doing the Full Monty at The Bistro. Toni and Paul help out when The Rovers Return Inn catches fire. Toni goes inside and gets Karl Munro (John Michie) out of one of the bedrooms when the roof collapses. She dies from her injuries.
Consultant	20 March–3 April	Victoria Carling	This consultant appears after Sunita Alahan (Shobna Gulati) is found in The Rovers Return Inn fire. She helps Sunita's ex-husband Dev (Jimmi Harkishin) get through Sunita's coma, and when Sunita looks like she is going to regain consciousness, Karl Munro (John Michie) murders her by removing her oxygen tube, as Sunita knew that Karl started the fire at The Rovers. The consultant then reveals this to Dev, who is devastated and repeatedly tells her that she is wrong and that he doesn't want his twin children, Aadi (Zennon Ditchett) and Asha (Tanisha Gorey) to go motherless so soon.
DS Willetts	24 March–13 September	James Quinn	DS Willetts is investigating The Rovers Return Inn fire, and questions Stella Price (Michelle Collins), the pub's landlady, about the blaze. He and his colleague, DC Leslie (Syreeta Kumar) then wait for Sunita Alahan (Shobna Gulati) to awake from her coma, as she was trapped in the fire, but no one knows why. The real arsonist, Stella's former boyfriend Karl Munro (John Michie), plants the keys he used to gain access to the pub in Sunita's belongings, leading to her becoming the prime suspect. Willetts then reveals this to Stella, Karl, Stella's mother Gloria Price (Sue Johnston) and daughter Eva Price (Catherine Tyldesley). As Sunita begins to show signs of regaining consciousness, Karl murders her by removing her oxygen tube. This shocks Willetts and Leslie, so they question Stella and Karl again about the night of the fire and their past with Sunita. In May, Sunita's ex-husband Dev Alahan (Jimmi Harkishin) decides to re-open the case to clear Sunita's name, so Willetts and a colleague arrive at Coronation Street to see what evidence Dev has. When it is shown that Dev has no evidence to clear Sunita's name, Willetts leaves. Dev, Jason Grimshaw (Ryan Thomas), Kirk Sutherland (Andrew Whyment), Beth Tinker (Lisa George) and her teenage son Craig Tinker (Colson Smith) all arrive at the police station in September, and reveal that Karl has been threatening Craig to keep quiet about the night of the fire, as Craig saw Karl leaving the pub just as it exploded with flames. Craig explains all to Willetts in a questioning room. Karl later holds Stella and Dev hostage in The Rovers, but Stella manages to persuade Karl to hand himself in for her. Karl is later arrested by DS Willetts for the murders of Sunita Alahan and Toni Griffiths (Tara Moran), the fire at The Rovers and terrorising young Craig.
DC Leslie	24 March–5 April	Syreeta Kumar	A colleague of DS Willetts' (James Quinn) in the investigation of The Rovers Return Inn fire. She helps Willetts question Stella Price (Michelle Collins), the pub's landlady, and awaits for Sunita Alahan (Shobna Gulati) to wake up from her coma, as she was also trapped in the fire. Sunita dies, so Leslie and Willetts question Stella again, this time about her past with Sunita.
Stan Whitmore	25–29 March	David Williams	Stan is a friend of Sylvia Goodwin's (Stephanie Cole) from the 1 O'clock Club. When he discovers that Sylvia is suffering due to her arthritis, Stan supplies her with chocolate brownies that secretly contain cannabis. Sylvia is mortified when she discovers this, and tells Stan to leave her alone. This leads to another batch of brownies being made for Sylvia, which she claims eases the pain of her arthritis. She lends some to Dennis Tanner (Philip Lowrie) due to his back ache, but she is left mortified when she learns that Anna Windass (Debbie Rush) has sold the rest to Dennis's wife Rita (Barbara Knox). Sylvia and Dennis rush to The Kabin, where the pair snatch the brownies from Rita, Norris Cole (Malcolm Hebden) and Mary Taylor (Patti Clare). Rita discovers that the brownies have cannabis in them, and contacts Sylvia's son Roy (David Neilson) to try to talk sense into Sylvia. Rita, Roy and Dennis manage to persuade Sylvia to visit Dr. Matt Carter (Oliver Mellor) to see what the side effects of cannabis are.
Nicola Waite	16–19 April	Maxine Burth	Nicola is a social worker who visits Anna Windass (Debbie Rush) after her adoptive daughter Faye (Ellie Leach) has raised an allegation of child abuse against her. Nicola and her colleague Stephen Bowyer (Dana Haqjoo) both question Anna, and then question Faye at the police station. After questioning Faye, Nicola re-visits Anna, telling her that Faye has dropped all charges against her. Anna then reveals to Nicola that she only raised them in the first place so that she could stay with her biological father, Tim Metcalfe (Joe Duttine).
Stephen Bowyer	16–19 April	Dana Haqjoo	Stephen is a police officer for the Child Protection Unit. He accompanies his colleague Nicola Waite (Maxine Burth) to Anna Windass' (Debbie Rush) house. It is soon revealed that Anna's adoptive daughter Faye (Ellie Leach) has raised a child abuse allegation against Anna. Stephen and Nicola question Anna, and then Stephen questions Faye at the police station. Faye constantly asks Stephen whether Anna will go to prison, and when Izzy Armstrong (Cherylee Houston) reveals it is a possibility, Faye admits she has lied and that Anna has never hit her. Stephen is not seen again, but Nicola appears when she arrives at Anna's house to inform her that Faye has dropped all charges against her.
Dorothy	6 May	Margaret Jackman	Dorothy is an old friend of Sylvia Goodwin's (Stephanie Cole). Sylvia visits Dorothy at her old retirement home with her daughter-in-law Hayley Cropper (Julie Hesmondhalgh). Dorothy, Sylvia and Hayley talk, where Dorothy gives Sylvia a letter that should have been opened in December 2011. It is addressed to Sylvia's son, Roy (David Neilson), and is from his father, St John. After opening and reading the letter, Sylvia decides to leave with Hayley, upsetting Dorothy. It then transpires that St John ran out on Sylvia and Roy when Roy was 10 years old.
Margaret Cropper	17 May	Helen Cotterill	Margaret is Roy Cropper's (David Neilson) stepmother. Roy and Hayley (Julie Hesmondhalgh) visit Margaret in Blackburn and reveal that they have come to meet Roy's father St John. Margaret refers to St John in the past tense, which leads Roy to realise that his father has died. Feeling bad, Margaret tells Roy that he has two half-brothers and one half-sister. Margaret then gives Roy an old-fashioned train set that St John left him in his will. Margaret says that she is sorry for Roy's loss and he says the same to her, before leaving.
Lee	24 May	Darren Connolly	Lee is a friend of Rob Donovan's (Marc Baylis) who helps him and his girlfriend Tracy Barlow (Kate Ford) rob silk from his sister Carla Connor's (Alison King) factory, Underworld. To help Rob and Tracy, Lee punches Tracy to make it look like she could do nothing to stop him from taking the silk. Tracy then returns to Underworld and informs Rob, Carla and Michelle Connor (Kym Marsh) of the assault.
PC Brewer	24 May	Chris Jack	PC Brewer arrives at Underworld factory after Tracy Barlow (Kate Ford) is assaulted while delivering silk to another company. Tracy's boyfriend Rob Donovan (Marc Baylis), Rob's sister Carla Connor (Alison King) and Carla's best friend Michelle Connor (Kym Marsh) watch as Tracy is interviewed by PC Brewer, and Carla and Michelle both share their thoughts on Tracy's attack.
Ant Edmunds	26–27 May, 8 July, 7 August	Alexander Newland	Ant is a friend of Paul Kershaw's (Tony Hirst) from the fire station. He helps Paul and his girlfriend Eileen Grimshaw (Sue Cleaver) persuade Dev Alahan (Jimmi Harkishin) to attend The Rovers Return Inn re-opening. It then transpires that Ant was a good friend to recently deceased fire fighter, Toni Griffiths (Tara Moran). Ant then attends The Rovers re-opening with Paul and Eileen. He is last seen playing darts with Paul. Ant returns in July, and has a drink with Paul, Eileen, Lloyd Mullaney (Craig Charles) and Steve McDonald (Simon Gregson). He reveals that he and Paul were called on a hoax call, which angers them. When Paul makes an off-colour remark in front of Lloyd and his family, Paul tells Eileen that he is not racist to Ant at work. Ant is next seen helping on the scene when David Platt (Jack P. Shepherd) and Nick Tilsley (Ben Price) get in a car accident.
Consultant	3 June	Ravin J Ganatra	This consultant tells Izzy Armstrong (Cherylee Houston), Gary Windass (Mikey North) and Tina McIntyre (Michelle Keegan) that baby Jake has caught a bowel infection and needs to have emergency surgery. This upsets Tina, Joe's legal mother. As Gary, Izzy, Tina, along with Tina's boyfriend, Tommy Duckworth (Chris Fountain), Gary's mother, Anna Windass (Debbie Rush) and Izzy's father, Owen Armstrong (Ian Puleston-Davies) wait for news, the consultant returns and reveals the operation went well, and Joe will be allowed home in a few days.
Ben Coombs	3–7 June	Johann Myers	Ben and Andy are old friends of Marcus Dent (Charlie Condou) and Sean Tully (Antony Cotton). Sean bumps into Ben outside Underworld and he invites both him and Marcus to his wedding to Andy on 7 June, unaware the pair have split up. Ben is disappointed to hear this, but hopes both will attend the wedding anyway. Unbeknown to Ben and Andy, Marcus is now in a heterosexual relationship with Maria Connor (Samia Ghadie). When Marcus brings Maria to the wedding reception, initially introducing her as his "best mate", Sean then tells Ben and Andy that the pair are in fact dating Maria, shocking the newly married couple. Ben and Andy accuse Marcus of denying who he is, leading Marcus to state that he's "a gay man who has fallen in love with a woman". This causes problems for Marcus and Maria's relationship, as Maria had not realised Marcus still identified as gay.
Andy Bartholomew	3–7 June	Lee Colley	
Paddy Kinsey	12 June	Sonny Cusworth	Paddy, his mother Megan and news reporter Will Reade visit Paul Kershaw (Tony Hirst) house after Paul saves Paddy from a burning building. It is revealed that nobody knew that Paddy was in the bedroom when the fire started, which upsets Megan as she thinks she is a bad mother. This stuns Paul's partner Eileen Grimshaw (Sue Cleaver), her son Jason (Ryan Thomas) and lodger Sean Tully (Antony Cotton). Paddy gives Paul a picture that he drew of him to say thanks for saving his life, which angers Eileen as she thought that Paul was at a hoax call.
Megan Kinsey	12 June	Louise Atkins	
Will Reade	12 June	Dominic Doughty	
Lad 1	28 June	Matthew Tomlinson	These lads are seen on the Red Rec when Roy Cropper (David Neilson) is sleepwalking. They both insult Roy and laugh at him, but when they realise he cannot hear them, they both ride off on their bikes.
Lad 2	28 June	Ciaran Clancy	These lads are seen on the Red Rec when Roy Cropper (David Neilson) is sleepwalking. They both insult Roy and laugh at him, but when they realise he cannot hear them, they both ride off on their bikes.
PC Smith	28 June	William Fox	PC Smith appears when Hayley Cropper (Julie Hesmondhalgh) and Sylvia Goodwin (Stephanie Cole) call the police when Hayley's husband and Sylvia's son, Roy (David Neilson) goes missing after going sleepwalking. PC Smith departs after Deirdre Barlow (Anne Kirkbride) brings Roy back to the café.
Jamie-Lee	5–10 July	Kate Holderness	Jamie-Lee is a girl who exchanges numbers with Ryan Connor (Sol Heras) and shares a kiss with him, but they are both unaware that they have been spotted by Beth Tinker (Lisa George) and Kirk Sutherland (Andrew Whyment). Ryan's girlfriend Katy Armstrong (Georgia May Foote) sees a series of text messages from Jamie-Lee to Ryan and follows Ryan to a bar, where she sees him with Jamie-Lee. Katy slams her handbag on the table where they are sitting and insults Jamie-Lee's age, and ends her relationship with Ryan.
Naila	8 July, 20 April 2015, 3 September 2017, 27 July 2018, 8 March 2019	Saira Choudhry	Naila is a journalist from the Weatherfield Gazette who arrives at Leanne Tilsley's (Jane Danson) student night at the bistro. She is bored while listening to Leanne and her husband Nick Tilsley (Ben Price), as she feels her boss deliberately gives her boring stories to write. When Leanne's brother-in-law David Platt (Jack P. Shepherd) calls the police and claims that there are drugs being used at the Bistro, the police turn up and a drugs raid begins. Naila loves this, and writes most of the story in her notebook, but Nick and David throw her out.
PC Burke	8 July	Giles Ford	PC Burke arrives at the bistro and declares a drugs raid after David Platt (Jack P. Shepherd) calls the police for revenge on his big brother, Nick Tilsley (Ben Price). PC Burke does not allow anyone to leave including Gail McIntyre (Helen Worth), Mary Taylor (Patti Clare), Kirk Sutherland (Andrew Whyment) and Beth Tinker (Lisa George). PC Burke also speaks to Naila (Saira Choudhry) for her newspaper article.
Police officer	8 July	Serena Ryan	This police officer accompanies PC Burke (Giles Ford) as he raids the Bistro looking for drugs after the police are called by David Platt (Jack P. Shepherd) as revenge on his half-brother Nick Tilsley (Ben Price).
Dr Akhtar	15–19 July	Vinny Dhillon	Dr Akhtar calls Hayley Cropper (Julie Hesmondhalgh) back to the Medical Centre after receiving the results of her recent tests. She reveals to Hayley that the results show signs of abnormal liver function, so she books Hayley in for an ultrasound scan. After having the ultrasound scan, Dr Akhtar calls Hayley to the Medical Centre once more, where she tells Hayley that there is a blockage in her bile duct. Hayley is confused by this, so asks for a more clear explanation and Dr Akhtar tells her she may have cancer.
Sonographer	19 July	Emily Pollet	The sonographer performs an ultrasound scan on Hayley Cropper (Julie Hesmondhalgh).
Mr Peakman	22 July–2 September	Simon Armstrong	Mr Peakman is the consultant diagnoses Hayley Cropper (Julie Hesmondhalgh) with stage-two pancreatic cancer. He explains to a devastated Hayley that she will need an operation and chemotherapy to eliminate the cancer. He tells her that one in five patients are living a healthy life five years after. He appears again when Hayley's distressed husband Roy (David Neilson) wants to discuss with him Hayley's treatment, but the consultant refuses to discuss anything while Hayley is absent. He helps Hayley prepare for her operation in September, but when he begins to operate on her, he breaks the dreadful news to Roy and Hayley that her cancer is incurable.
Nurse Alice	22 July–5 September	Juliet Ellis	Alice is a nurse who is present when Hayley Cropper (Julie Hesmondhalgh) is diagnosed with pancreatic cancer. Alice also helps Hayley when she is told that her cancer is terminal.
Secretary	26 July	Frog Stone	The secretary refuses to let Roy Cropper (David Neilson) see the consultant, who diagnosed his wife Hayley (Julie Hesmondhalgh) with pancreatic cancer. The consultant does let Roy see him, but orders Roy to apologise to the secretary.
Jeweller	26 July	Marc Parry	A jeweller who helps Carla Connor (Alison King) and Peter Barlow (Chris Gascoyne) while they are shopping for an engagement ring for Carla.
Hannah	23 September	Natalie Armstrong	Hannah is a girl who has sex with Ryan Connor (Sol Heras). She is seen talking to Ryan's mother Michelle (Kym Marsh) before leaving.
Jude Cronk	9 October	Jemima Abey	Jude is the manager of the cancer support group that Roy (David Neilson) and Hayley Cropper (Julie Hesmondhalgh) attend.
Jane Rayner	9 October–11 November	Heather Bleasdale	Jane is a bubbly friend of Hayley Cropper's (Julie Hesmondhalgh) whom she meets at a cancer support group. Like Hayley, Jane is also dying from inoperable pancreatic cancer. Hayley, Jane, Jane's husband Jeff and Hayley's husband Roy (David Neilson) all sit down for a talk. Jeff tells Roy and Hayley that Jane will spend the final days of her life in a hospice, which helps Hayley make her mind up about what she would like to do for her last days. Roy tells Hayley that he dislikes Jane. She and Jeff appear again when Jane, Jeff, Roy and Hayley all meet in Weatherfield. Jane explains to Hayley that the difficult part about her illness is that she will never see her young children grow up. Hayley is later informed that Jane has been rushed into a hospice, so she and Roy go to visit her. Hayley is stunned about how dazed Jane is after taking morphine. A fews weeks later, Hayley collapses and is rushed to hospital. When she returns, she is desperate to visit Jane, but Roy persuades her to rest. When they visit the next day, Jeff arrives and reveals that Jane has died at 10.21pm the previous night. Hayley is devastated, and she and Roy both attend Jane's funeral in November.
Jeff Rayner	9 October–11 November	Jim Millea	
