= Ella Forster =

Fictional character from Emmerdale

- Emmerdale character
- Portrayed by: Paula Lane
- Duration: 2024–2025
- First appearance: Episode 9891; 16 January 2024
- Last appearance: Episode 10257/58; 3 April 2025
- Introduced by: Laura Shaw
In-universe information
- Other names: Ruth Davies
- Occupation: Personal assistant Receptionist

Ella Forster is a fictional character from the British soap opera Emmerdale, played by Paula Lane. The character and casting was announced in November 2023, with Lane beginning filming later that month. Lane made her first appearance as Ella on 16 January 2024. Lane did not need to audition for the role and she felt like she fit in Emmerdale due to being from Yorkshire herself. Lane wanted Ella to be seen as different from Kylie Platt, a character that Lane had portrayed on rival soap opera Coronation Street. Ella is introduced at a vet gala and immediately loses her job when she stands up for Mandy Dingle (Lisa Riley), who she becomes friends with. Lane was happy that Mandy and Ella develop a friendship and believed that Ella is a good friend to have. Ella then is offered a job at the new doctors surgery, where she develops a romance with her colleague, Liam Cavanagh (Jonny McPherson). This later develops into a love triangle involving Chas Dingle (Lucy Pargeter). In December 2024, it was reported that Lane would be departing the soap in 2025. Since the announcement of the character, some critics and fans have felt that Ella is too nice and is hiding something, with Lane revealing that the character does have a secret that will be revealed. Some fans and critics have shared theories that Ella is connected to another character in the soap. However, Ella has also gained positive reception, with critics praising the character's personality and her introduction scenes.

== Casting and creation ==
"Timings wise I think I manifested it. Then a conversation came about and a seed was planted – then the magic happened. It was a little bit of a coincidence, but it fell in my lap. I feel really grateful."

— Lane on how she got cast on Emmerdale

The character and casting was announced on 21 November 2023, with it being reported that Lane would begin filming that same month. It was reported that Ella would meet Mandy Dingle (Lisa Riley) and her partner Paddy Dingle (Dominic Brunt) at the veterinary ball, which would lead to Ella losing her job after sticking up for Mandy, but then would find "luck" when she has a "chance encounter" with Manpreet Sharma (Rebecca Sarker). It was later revealed by Inside Soap that Ella would be a "permanent fixture" in the soap and would be involved in an "explosive love triangle". Lane started filming later that November, with Emmerdale posting a "behind-the-scenes" video of Lane's first day on Instagram. In the video, Lane was seen wearing scrubs and said that she was feeling a little nervous.

Craig Jones from Leeds Live reported that the Emmerdale team were "delighted" by Lane's casting. Emmerdale producer Kate Brooks teased the character, saying, "Ella is a complex and multi-layered character who comes to the village and certainly makes an impact. Ostensibly she's a good, moral character, but is there more to her than meets the eye? We are absolutely thrilled to welcome an actor of Paula's calibre to the show and we can't wait to have her light up our screens." Lane had previously auditioned for the roles of Gennie Walker, Holly Barton and a lawyer on the soap. Lane's audition for Genie was her first television audition, and prior to that she had written to Emmerdale when she was still in acting school, in which she said that she loved the show and would love to work there. In 2023, Lane invited the Emmerdale casting team to see her perform in the play Quality Street, which led to her being contacted about the role of Ella.

Lane said that was she was "so excited" to be joining the Emmerdale cast, adding, "Everyone has been so welcoming and I can't wait to start a new chapter playing the role of Ella. I've already heard there are big plans for her and I can't wait to see her navigate a new life in the village and hopefully make some friends!" Lane was not required to audition for the role and revealed that working on Emmerdale worked for her "family-wise" due to living close to the set. Lane watched the soap since she was young and revealed that her family are fans of it, with Lane remembering Tate and Sugden families and Home Farm from when was younger. Because of this, Lane found it strange going into the Emmerdale sets due to having watched the soap for so long. Lane also had friends who had previously appeared on the soap that were excited to have her there. Lane felt "at home" in the village and felt like she fit in due to being from Yorkshire herself. Lane found the Emmerdale set beautiful, calling it very "chocolate box-esque". Lane believed that being on Emmerdale seemed like a "natural fit" after being in ITV's Coronation Street, but wanted to develop something "completely different" from what people had seen from her character, Kylie Platt, during her time on the rival soap. Lane also believed that the eight years being off Coronation Street meant that enough time had passed for her to "branch out" and be seen as someone different. Speaking of why she took the role, Lane explained:

"I'm always a big believer in going with kind of what's put in front of you. And the past seven years have been really exciting. I mean, I've covered loads of theatre, covered lots of ground, as well as raising my family, and doing guest roles on different TV programmes as well. So I think when you are such a familiar face, it's nice to give the audience a bit of a breather. And I feel like I've changed as well, you know, personally, as well. So I think, yeah, it's a good bit of time that's passed. And I think that's healthy."

Lane later signed another contract to stay on the soap opera. In December 2024, it was reported that Lane had chosen to leave the role and would film her final scenes in February 2025, which was written in her Spotlight biography by Lane herself. ITV did not comment on the report.

== Characterisation ==
Ella was described as "compassionate and caring" and "far from a pushover", and it was reported that it would not be "long" until Ella is "turning heads in the village". Lane has said that Ella is "very professional" and although not "scrappy", she does not "mince her words". Lane believed that Ella is a good friend to have on one's side. Lane revealed that Ella, who is 29 years old, is single and that there may be a romance in store for her. The actress also confirmed that she believed that Ella has no family members on the soap, though added that it was possible that that would change. Lane has said that she believed that it was important to her to develop a "brand new character" that is different from what the audience has seen through her work on Coronation Street.

Lane has explained that there are traits that she shares with Ella, explaining that she believes that they are both a "good judge of character" and both "switched on and sociable", as well as how they both stand up for themselves. Lane admitted that would like Ella to trust herself and other people more, but added that "perhaps she has good reason to try and overly protect herself". The actress explained that there would be more that viewers would see to the character, explaining that when something or someone is really important to Ella and is at risk, she will "fight so hard to protect that situation".

== Development ==
Ella's first scenes involve her meeting Mandy at the Vets Social event, where Ella consoles and stands up for Mandy after hearing her "loud-mouthed" boss Jules Jefferson (Wayne Cater) make rude comments about Mandy and her fashion. Lane revealed that Ella's boss has been "pushing and pushing her" and that it is the "final straw" when she sees him humiliate Mandy, who Ella wants to stand up for. Ella then pours a drink over Jules when he continues making rude comments towards Mandy, which leads her to losing her job. Lane was glad that Ella and Mandy develop a quick friendship, believing that they would be a "great pair", and revealed that the friendship would develop further. She added that Mandy can see that Ella is a "good friend to have" and that there is an immediate spark between them. Dawn also connects with Dawn Fletcher (Olivia Bromley), who is struggling to breastfeed her newborn son. Lane said that whilst she had already met many "wonderful" characters, she wanted to work more with the Dingle family, saying, "I think Mandy should invite Ella round for a Dingle Dinner to introduce me to her family!"

Ella is later impulsively offered a job offer as a receptionist at the new doctors surgery by Manpreet Sharma (Rebecca Sarker), who overhears her conversation with Mandy following being fired. The new surgery had already been referenced in previous episodes prior to Ella's arrival, with Olivia Wheeler from the Daily Mirror noting that it would tie in "perfectly" to Ella's arrival. Lane joked that she needed to "look like" she knows what she is doing on the computer due to Ella being the new receptionist.

Shortly after starting her job at the new surgery, Ella is speculated to be a love interest of her colleague, Liam Cavanagh (Jonny McPherson), which begins with Liam showing her the ropes at the surgery. Their other colleague, Wendy Posner (Susan Cookson), who had previously had an affair with Liam, notices the pair's "playful vibe" and believes that a romantic spark is developing. Lane had previously teased the storyline, explaining that she was unsure as there had already been a relationship at the surgery. She added that there "might be some fireworks, there's a little bit of competition, perhaps. There's a little love triangle going on. But behind closed doors, who knows what can happen". It later begins to become apparent that Ella has "somewhat of a crush" on Liam. When Manpreet begins noticing the "cute" interactions between Ella and Liam, she sits down with Liam, Ella and Wendy to discuss "appropriate behaviour in the workplace", which leads to Liam becoming defensive and Ella leaving the meeting. Calli Kitson from Metro called the meeting "very awkward".

Liam is later overjoyed when Ella finally accepts his "long-awaited" date invitation, with a writer from Inside Soap questioning whether this could be Liam's "happy ever after". Ella then goes for a drink with Liam and is flustered when she finds out about Liam's various ex-girlfriends, so she tells people that she and Liam are nothing more than colleagues to prevent "gossip" from spreading. Ella then kisses Liam outside the pub but rushes off when Kerry Wyatt (Laura Norton) sees them, leaving Liam "puzzled". Calli Kitson from Metro questioned whether this was because Ella does not want to be the "centre of village chatter" or whether she is hiding a "dark secret. Ella then finds herself in a love triangle with Liam and Chas Dingle (Lucy Pargeter), who had previously had a fling with Liam. When Ella spots them "looking very intimate" and revealing their feelings for each other, Ella feels "jealous" and "confused" due to having possibly misread the signals. Metro's Kitson believed that the love triangle was caused by Liam's "inability to be honest" and mixed feelings, as well as him not wanting to hurt Ella's feelings. Lane explained that the situation is "complex" due to Chas and Liam having a past, with the actress adding, "Liam and Ella are a fresh duo, they don't know each other that well and for now make each other laugh a great deal – of course I'm going to say we make the best couple because it's mysterious and new!" Lane believed that Ella would be disappointed that she misread Liam's intentions but still ultimately let him go, with Lane explaining "Ella is too much of a survivor though to dwell and am sure would dust herself down and pick herself up". Just as Chas is about to "go for it" again with Liam, Ella – taking the advice of Liam's other ex, Leyla Harding (Roxy Shahidi), who had assured her that Liam only has eyes for her – grabs Liam and gives him an extended kiss and tells him that she wants to be his girlfriend. Speaking of the scene, Lane said that Ella puts her "heart on the line" and the action is "enough to tell him that she means business". Liam awkwardly accepts Ella's proposal but then tries to undo his mistake. Sarah Waterfall from What's On TV explained that whilst Liam is going on dates with Ella, it is Chas who he "really wants", and that Leyla's advice has now ruined it. Liam then confides in Leyla about the situation and she, having realised her mistake, tells Liam to go get Chas "without delay".

In March 2024, Lane revealed that Ella's past would be revealed, with the actress explaining that Ella has "responsibilities elsewhere outside the village that mean a great deal to her and I'm so looking forward to exploring this further". The actress also teased that there is "currently a lot at stake" for Ella and "a lot to fight for". The following month, pictures from upcoming episodes were published in the Daily Mirror which showed Ella and Liam at a funeral, though the connection between Ella and the person who had died not being yet revealed.

== Storylines ==
Ella, a PA, meets Mandy Dingle (Lisa Riley) at the veterinary gala, and the two comfort each other when Ella's boss, Jules Jefferson (Wayne Cater), is rude to them. Ella tells Mandy that Jules treats her horribly but puts up with him as she needs the money. Ella then pours beer over Jules after he humiliates Mandy over her outfit, leading to Ella losing her job. Mandy's partner, Paddy Dingle (Dominic Brunt), assumes that Mandy poured the drink and shouts at her, though Ella takes responsibility. Ella also meets Dawn Fletcher (Olivia Bromley) at the gala. The following day, Ella and Mandy meet up to talk about what has happened, and their conversation is overheard by local GP Manpreet Sharma (Rebecca Sarker). Manpreet then offers Ella a job as a receptionist at the new surgery.

When Ella starts working there, her colleague Liam Cavanagh (Jonny McPherson) shows Ella the ropes. The two start flirting and have a spark, which is noticed by Wendy Posner (Susan Cookson), who also works at the surgery. Manpreet notices the attraction and is not happy, so she organises a meeting with Wendy, Ella and Liam to talk about appropriate behaviour in the workplace. When alone, Manpreet tells Ella about how Wendy and Liam previously had an affair and how it devastated Wendy's partner Bob Hope (Tony Audenshaw), but Ella tells Manpreet that she and Liam are both single and thus they would not be doing anything wrong. Ella later goes on a date with Liam at the local pub, but she runs off after kissing him.

== Reception ==
For her role as Ella, Lane was longlisted for "Best newcomer" at the 2024 Inside Soap Awards, whilst "Ella's killer past revealed" was longlisted for "Best Showstopper".

Speaking of the character's debut, Maisie Spackman from Metro wrote "Frankly, we can't wait!" Less than a day after the character was announced, Olivia Wheeler from The Daily Mirror reported how viewers had speculated on Twitter that was Ella was actually another upcoming character, Ruby Fox-Miligan (Beth Cordingly), whose casting had not yet been announced; the announcement of Ruby's character debuting had come shortly before Ella's. Jasmine Allday from the same website reported on how fans were speculating that Ella was connected to established character Mackenzie Boyd (Lawrence Robb), with some speculating that he would the one who Ella has a romance with. Months later, Charlotte Tutton from the Daily Mirror noted how fans had "long predicted" that Ella is secretly linked to another Emmerdale character. Tutton also noted how fans had theorised that Ella is in cahoots with Thomas King (James Chase) and is secretly his sister Anya King, whilst others theorised that Ella was seeking revenge for Manpreet's serial killer sister, Meena Jutla (Paige Sandhu).

A writer from We Love TV called Ella a "fiery newcomer". A writer from Inside Soap wrote that Ella would make a "dramatic first impression". Kerry Barrett from Entertainment Daily wrote how Ella would arrive to the village "with a bang" and questioned whether Ella would be a troublemaker or "just in the wrong place at the wrong time", as well as hinting that Ella and Mandy would "double trouble". Following Ella's debut, Sarah Ellis from Inside Soap joked "Just don't upset Ella, you'll end up soaked in beer!" Ellis' colleague, Steven Murphy, called Ella a "Dale's Diva". Alison Slade from TV Times believed that Liam is "too much of a gentlemen/wimp" to reject Ella's proposal and thus "finds himself lumbered with a girlfriend he doesn't want". Slade also explained that Liam and Ella's "full-on snog" would have been "peachy" were if not for the fact that Liam would rather be with Chas. Additionally, Slade believed that Chas was the "right woman" for Liam, rather than Ella.

In March 2024, Chloe Timms from Inside Soap wrote that Ella seemed "too nice" and added that "Normally that means revenge" in soap operas. The following month, Laura-Jayne Tyler from the same magazine was confused by the fact that Wendy reminded Ella of Dolores Umbridge, writing "Okay... that's some leap". Calli Kitson from Metro called Ella a "kind-hearted newcomer". Kitson also wrote that whilst Ella had been "established as a kind and thoughtful person", the fact that Ella had left swiftly after kissing Liam, in addition to the "running soap theory [that] a 'nice' character is always hiding something", had resulted in fans believing Ella has ulterior motives. When it was confirmed by Lane that Ella is hiding something, some fans speculated that Ella would be revealed as the daughter of Rose Jackson (Christine Tremarco) and possibly Will Taylor (Dean Andrews), making her the sister of Dawn.

Following the reveal of Ella's secret, Tyler from Inside Soap wrote, "The Ella reveal will receive mixed reactions; truthfully, we were wary about putting her in the centre of this page [of Soap Opera highlights]. Yet the one thing we can surely agree on is the performance of Paula Lane, who totally blew our socks off while portraying the harrowing details of her character's past. That can't have been easy, by any stretch of the imagination. Brave, bold and breath-taking telly." Timms from the same magazine wrote that Lane had made her feel "sorry" for Ella, and wrote that now there was "so much more" that she wants to know about the character's past. Lewis Knight from Radio Times called Ella a "feisty receptionist" with a "shocking backstory", and questioned whether she would find peace before her departure.
