= Becky McDonald =

Fictional character from Coronation Street

- Coronation Street character
- Portrayed by: Katherine Kelly
- Duration: 2006–2012
- First appearance: 5 February 2006
- Last appearance: 23 January 2012
- Introduced by: Tony Wood
- Spin-off appearances: Out of Africa (2008); Romanian Holiday (2009)
In-universe information
- Occupation: Cleaner; Seamstress; Waiter; Bartender; Businesswoman
- Mother: Cath Granger
- Half-sisters: Kylie Platt
- Husband: Steve McDonald (2009–2011)
- Stepdaughters: Amy Barlow
- Nephews: Max Turner
- Nieces: Lily Platt

Becky McDonald (also Granger) is a fictional character from the British soap opera Coronation Street, played by Katherine Kelly. Becky was created by producer Tony Wood, and made her debut in the episode airing on 5 February 2006. Kelly was initially contracted to appear for three months, but became a series regular after impressing the serial's producers. In April 2011, Kelly announced her decision to leave the soap. Producer Phil Collinson created dramatic storylines in the build-up to her exit.

Becky's storylines focused on her friendship with Roy (David Neilson) and Hayley Cropper (Julie Hesmondhalgh), which helped change public opinion of the character, and her relationship with Jason Grimshaw (Ryan Thomas) and her marriage with Steve McDonald (Simon Gregson), with the latter producing two wedding storylines which were highly publicised by ITV. Other notable storylines have included her drunken rampages, two miscarriages and her desire to adopt a child. Becky was portrayed as a no-nonsense character, whose time on the show has been described as a journey. Viewers saw her change from a "thieving ex-con" into a vulnerable woman. The character was praised by crime-reduction charity Nacro for changing opinions on former prisoners. She has been referred to as a "Coronation Street icon", and one of the serial's most popular characters, with critics often praising her activities. However, her tendency to smoke when under stress and litter the streets with cigarettes were criticised by UK environmental agencies. Kelly garnered various awards and nominations for her portrayal of Becky.

== Creation and casting ==
Becky was created as a short-term recurring character, working in the Underworld sewing factory. The character was deemed popular so producers decided to bring her back, with executive producer Steve Frost initially pitching the idea of bringing in her family, stating: "Becky will leave Weatherfield for a short period of time and shock the Street's residents when her relatives return with her." However, this never materialised and Becky returned without any relatives. It was also thought that producers were going to kill the character off, in her early stages.

Auditions were held for the role of Becky which required the auditionee to look deliberately scruffy. Actress Katherine Kelly commented: "I was told to turn up looking as crap as possible, with no make-up. But that morning I'd also been for an audition where I had to look really glamorous. So I sat on the Tube putting grease in my hair and wiping my make-up off with everyone looking at me. By the time I got there I looked a right state!". Kelly was initially only cast for a three-month period when she began filming in 2006, but impressed producers and was offered an extended contract as a regular character. On 17 June 2008, after further impressing the producers, Kelly was signed for an additional 12 months. In February 2009, Kelly again had her contract extended, securing her role in the soap until August 2011. However, in 2010 Kelly was signed to a new 18-month contract by new producer Phil Collinson, a contract which was described as "unprecedented" at the time.

== Development ==
=== Characterisation ===
The Daily Mirror's Beth Neil has observed that during her time on Coronation Street, Becky has morphed "from a thieving tearaway into a vulnerable young woman, clearly damaged from a troubled upbringing." Kelly has commented that Becky finds it hard to rely on others, as she is: "Very out of sorts, because she's a very independent, feisty sort of character." She has stated that she loves Becky's "trailer trash" appearance.

Becky Granger as she appeared in 2006.

Becky is not an aspirational character, and she strives to be normal, satisfied with a "hard up lifestyle". She has changed since her early days, having calmed down a little in terms of her often out of control behaviour. Of this, Kelly comments: "If someone had said to me that in three years' time she'd be Becky McDonald and would be behind the bar in the Rovers, I wouldn't have believed it [...] When Becky first came in she was a totally different character, but she's calmed down a lot and her softer side has come out."

Over the course of the series, elements of Becky's backstory are revealed to the viewer. The character is stated to have been raised by an abusive, alcoholic mother until leaving home at the age of 14 after being raped by her mother's boyfriend. Becky was left to fend for herself until she was taken into care. Becky has mentioned living with numerous foster families, but stated that none of them were willing to adopt her as she was somewhat of a "wild child". Becky had a heavily disrupted education, having attended many schools, several of which she was expelled from.

Becky became the 50th barmaid at the Rovers Return Inn in June 2008. Kelly opined that the character's ex-con personality would give her an advantage behind the bar, explaining: "The previous producer, Steve Frost, loved the idea of a barmaid who could lose her temper and throw a punch. Becky's an ex-con so she can fight dirty like nobody else." The character's chain smoking tendencies often play out onscreen when she is experiencing stress, something which drew off-screen criticism for her disregard of littering the streets with her cigarette butts. ITV publicity has described Becky as having many different levels to her persona, stating that she loves drinking cider, and that she is not bothered by how she looks, though when she dresses up, she "dresses to the nines" with big earrings, gold rings, logo belts and hair pieces. She dislikes anyone ordering her about, as she cannot handle being told what to do.

Kelly has also revealed that she often changes the material within scripts to play out best how she thinks Becky would act in certain situations. Kelly stated she did not think Becky would slap other characters, instead opting for punches. She stated: "The script often says, 'Becky slaps Steve' but we try to find a different way to do it. I always think she wouldn't slap, she would punch". Kelly was involved in other violent scenes featuring her character, adding "The slap is too common in soaps".

=== Relationships ===
Becky formed a friendship with local residents Roy (David Neilson) and Hayley Cropper (Julie Hesmondhalgh). Becky's on-screen partnership with Roy was particularly successful. Kelly stated it was the turning point in her character's development that won public affection, while Neilson stated that it was an "arranged marriage" by producers, delighted with its outcome. Becky's first serious romantic relationship in the soap was with builder Jason Grimshaw (Ryan Thomas). Their relationship was a turning point in what has been described as a "journey" for the character. Kelly spoke of Becky's different attributes in their relationship, during an interview stating: "She absolutely believes that she's 100% in love with him. I see it as a very teenage relationship because of the on-off status. Becky's very mature in many ways – she's very streetwise and if you needed something, you'd go to Becky and she'd find it for you. But emotionally, she's very immature. That's a lot to do with why she gets on so well with Roy because he's quite emotionally immature, too. It's probably the one level that they do connect on." Fans approached the actress in the streets, claiming they were jealous of her because of her on-screen romance with Jason. Following her breakup with Jason, and the aftermath which was highly publicised in the media, such as the Daily Mirror.

"It's all her dreams come true. When she first arrived on the Street, she was homeless – that was the only definition of Becky I got when I originally landed the part. To go from the old fingerless gloves to setting up a flat with Jason, the fittest guy on the Street, it's the best life has ever been for her."

— Kelly on Becky's change in luck. (2008).

She then embarked on an affair with fellow resident Steve McDonald (Simon Gregson). Kelly stated during an interview that she felt Becky was "punching above her weight" with Jason. Kelly revealed that she felt Steve was the best man for Becky over her previous lover Jason, stating: "Both boys bring out different things in Becky. With Jason, they liked going clubbing, and it was no strings attached, I think Becky needs more than that, even though she wouldn't admit it. I think, long-term, Steve's better for her." When Gregson was interviewed by entertainment website Digital Spy, he was asked if he thought that his character has had a positive impact on Becky's life. In reply, he stated: "I think he's turned it around. She was all over the place getting into trouble all the time but he's made her grow up. And having a little girl there in Amy, that's made her grow a bit, too. She's got responsibilities now. She's besotted with him. She's still a total pisshead, though!" Steve and Becky attempted to marry twice in 2009; their first wedding was given a promotional push from ITV, which aired adverts for the first wedding episodes. Their relationship was featured in a series of romantic plots which ITV dubbed the "Summer of Love" season of the soap, with advertisements for it airing.

In 2009, Slug (Marshall Lancaster), who had been seen on-screen dating Becky in her early appearances, returned. The two characters share a backstory, which was partially created by Lancaster and Kelly themselves. During an interview with Digital Spy, Kelly spoke the impact Slug has had on Becky, stating: "Marshall and I have invented a whole back story between us. It's nice to remember where Becky came from and what a journey she's had. Slug was an important part of Becky's life – they've got a lot of history. They grew up together and looked out for each other." The storyline progresses into Slug confessing his love for Becky. Kelly points out that Becky has been on a journey, subsequently changing, stating that "Becky and Slug didn't know what love was" and that she proves she has changed by rejecting his advances.

Becky later forged a friendship with Claire Peacock (Julia Haworth). Of this unlikely love/hate friendship, Kelly stated: "Claire and Becky strike up a weird, weird friendship because the kids are a similar age, Josh and Amy. [...] So the trouble begins. One minute [Becky and Claire] are good friends and the next, they're really not." Becky's relationship with her mother was never shown onscreen, but when she died, Kelly stated: "Becky hated her, and the death has brought back a lot of bad memories." In 2010 it was announced that Becky's half-sister would join the cast, with Kelly stating: "We've got some really, really exciting stuff happening. Becky's going to get a half-sister – a younger sister". Kelly had stated that her family was not introduced on-screen because producers didn't want to "pin her character down" with one set of characters.

=== Miscarriages and adoption ===
In 2010, the character underwent changes in appearance and direction, with Becky suffering two miscarriages. Kelly branded the storyline challenging, admitting she felt a huge responsibility to get it right: "It's definitely been the hardest thing I've done since I've been here. I think the responsibility to do it well that you feel is huge." Kelly also spoke of the sadness she felt for the impact the plot has on her character, adding: "She can't really put up any barriers about this – it's the worst thing that's ever happened. She goes from being a girl to a woman, I think. I'm just devastated for her". Kelly brands the storyline as her hardest: "Most of Becky's storylines have an element of fun in there somewhere, but with this one it was just like a cloud was hanging over me for six weeks."

However, Becky and Steve decide to adopt, in a storyline which was originally meant for Liz McDonald (Beverley Callard). It was revealed that Becky was given the storyline because producer Kim Crowther was determined to feature such a plot. Becky does not like the idea at first, thinking she would make a bad mother, but later changes her mind. The storyline saw various character changes implemented to Becky; in real life, Kelly was forced to reduce the length of her hair. This was written into scripts to fit with the adoption storyline, which saw Becky changing her wardrobe to fool social workers. Of this, Kelly stated: "With the adoption storyline, she borrows Claire Peacock's clothes for a while because she wants to look good for the social worker coming round. We thought it was a good opportunity for her to have a slight image change." Kelly further spoke of her admiration for her character's former image, adding: "I love Becky with long hair and if it could have been possible I'd have kept her with long blonde hair forever but sometimes nature and practicalities take over!"

In an interview with tabloid newspaper the Daily Mirror, Kelly revealed that she researched the storyline at the Manchester Adoption Society, who expressed their delight that two high-profile characters were given such a plot. Kelly initially thought Becky would not be able to adopt because of her criminal record, but the society pointed out that the storyline would highlight the fact that adoption is possible for previous offenders, with Kelly stating: "They said the two main things they look for are stability in a family and a lot of back-up at home, which Becky and Steve have with Roy, Hayley and Liz." On what kind of mother Becky will be, Kelly added: "She'd either palm it off on Roy and Hayley and the Barlows, or she would be over-protective and not want it to have the life she had."

=== Introduction of family ===
Producers later introduced a half-sister for Becky, in the form of Kylie Platt (Paula Lane). Kylie was initially described as having a "full on" personality, similar to Becky. When she arrives, she ruins her and Steve's plans for adoption. She and Kylie brawl violently over the incident; Lane received bruising from filming the scenes. The scenes were so violent that they were toned down before transmission. Kelly described Kylie and Becky as having a love-hate relationship, but at the time, she "wants to kill her". Lane herself stated that Kylie loves Becky, but "feels resentful that she left home when she was only eight. Becky was like a mother to Kylie."

It is then revealed Kylie has a son, Max (Harry McDermott), who is in foster care. Lane stated that when she gets Max back, Kylie takes advantage of Becky's bond with him. In another storyline, Kylie makes a pass at Steve. Steve decides not to tell Becky because he knows Kylie will take Max away, as she is trouble. Kylie plays on the fact Becky is desperate for a child, and offers to sell Max to her. Gregson said he felt it immoral to buy a child, but stressed "Kylie isn't an ordinary mother – she only cares about herself." He said that Steve believes Max would be better off with him and Becky. Steve is first to take Kylie seriously; Gregson believed this was because Kylie has "proved herself ruthless" and "not the best mum". Lane was so shocked with the storyline that she had to take breaks from filming scenes.

=== Departure ===
In 2011, Kelly decided to quit the role of Becky. She said it was one of the "hardest decisions of her life" but felt it was the right time to "say goodbye to Becky". Executive producer Phil Collinson remarked that Kelly was talented and managed to make Becky into a "firm favourite" with viewers. Kelly finished filming her final scenes as Becky on 9 December 2011, for the episode aired 23 January 2012; Becky leaves by ruining the wedding of Steve McDonald and Tracy Barlow.

== Storylines ==
Becky first appears in Weatherfield as an old friend of factory worker Kelly Crabtree (Tupele Dorgu), who first encounters Becky begging on the streets, and then later at the police station after she has been arrested for shoplifting and Kelly is retrieving her stolen handbag after previously being mugged. Kelly feels sorry for Becky and gives her some money. She then helps get Becky a job at the Underworld lingerie factory but Becky later frames Kelly for theft. After betraying Kelly, she leaves the area for several months, returning later in the year when she meets former workmate Hayley Cropper (Julie Hesmondhalgh), who is teaching an ex-offenders literacy class. Becky promises Hayley she will reform, and is offered a job at Roy's Rolls, the café owned and run by Hayley's partner, Roy Cropper (David Neilson). She does not change as promised and soon begins breaking the Croppers' property, threatening customers and stealing money from the till. Slug (Marshall Lancaster), a former acquaintance of Becky's, arrives in Weatherfield and the two joyride in the Croppers' newly acquired Morris Minor. Becky loses the couple's trust and her job. Hayley refuses Becky's apologies and when the café catches fire and Becky is rescued from the burning building, the Croppers assume she was responsible. Hayley apologises to Becky on learning that the fire was caused by an electrical fault and the two resume their friendship, with Becky re-employed at Roy's Rolls.

Becky starts dating builder Jason Grimshaw (Ryan Thomas), but after being with him for several months, she cheats on him with pub landlord Steve McDonald (Simon Gregson). Jason and Becky move in together, but when Jason's ex-wife, Sarah Grimshaw (Tina O'Brien), reveals she is considering coming home, he ends things with Becky. Becky attacks Jason in The Rovers Return pub and then goes on a pub crawl, getting drunk and stealing a girl's purse in a nightclub, flashing her breasts in public, and vandalising a travel agency window and a police car. When the police bring Becky in for questioning over her actions, she encounters DC Hooch (Dominic Carter), an adversary from her past. Becky claims to have been with Steve on the night of her rampage and blackmails him to give her a false alibi, threatening to tell his partner Michelle Connor (Kym Marsh) about their one-night stand.

Becky reveals to Steve that Hooch arrested her for shoplifting when she was 15, and attempted to molest her. She filed a complaint against him at the time, and Hooch is determined to get his revenge as this harmed his promotion prospects. During Becky's trial, Steve develops genuine feelings for her and they begin an affair, with Steve promising to leave Michelle. Although he keeps his promise, Becky reunites with Jason, eventually leading to him proposing to her. She accepts but reconsiders when Steve proposes as well. Becky ultimately breaks up with Jason and moves in with Steve. His daughter, Amy Barlow (Amber Chadwick), initially dislikes Becky, prompting her to put their wedding on hold, though Steve eventually convinces her to set a date.

Becky gets a bright pink princess style wedding dress, but she ends up getting drunk on champagne on the day of the wedding, and turns up so drunk that the registrar refuses to perform the ceremony. They plan a second ceremony, with Becky now wearing a white wedding dress with feathers on, and Slug returns, seemingly reformed but actually working for Hooch. Slug plants drugs on Becky. At Becky and Steve's second wedding, the reception is raided by police, and Becky is arrested for drug possession. Steve hires lawyers to free Becky, and afterwards Steve and Becky find Slug and convince him to tell them what Hooch has on him to make Slug even consider framing Becky. They use it to blackmail Hooch into calling a truce and drop the charges.

Becky tells Steve that she is pregnant and he later discovers that Becky has already told Claire Peacock (Julia Haworth); Steve tells his mother, Liz McDonald (Beverley Callard). Unfortunately, Becky miscarries twice, although she was unaware of her second pregnancy. Medical tests reveal an abnormality of the womb, meaning she is unable to carry a child full-term, making Becky decide that she wants to adopt. During the process, Steve needs a reference from Amy's mother, Tracy Barlow (Kate Ford), who promptly uses it to cause trouble, making Becky threaten, in return, that Tracy will never see Amy again. Unfortunately Becky and Steve are refused the right to adopt because her estranged half-sister, Kylie Turner (Paula Lane) gave a bad reference and the fact that Social Services feel that it is too soon after her miscarriages. She confronts Kylie, but the sisters eventually reconcile and Becky helps Kylie reclaim custody of her son, Max (Harry McDermott). Becky becomes very attached to Max, while Kylie becomes more irresponsible. Kylie announces plans to move to Cyprus with her new boyfriend and Becky begs her to reconsider, so Kylie offers to sell Max to her and Steve for £20,000, which they agree to. On the night of the tram crash, Kylie returns and demands more money, so Becky steals £5,000 from the ruins of Dev Alahan's (Jimmi Harkishin) corner shop, to pay Kylie off. Tracy is released from prison and the two start feuding again, particularly after Tracy discovers Max's sale and agrees to keep quiet in exchange for Amy. When Tracy is brutally attacked, Becky is arrested for the incident until Claire admits she was responsible but Becky admits looting Dev's shop, Sunita Alahan (Shobna Gulati) is furious but does not report her. When Liz finds out she makes life hard for Becky. Becky gets drunk and attacks Kylie and forces Liz out of the pub. Steve's father, Jim McDonald (Charles Lawson) offers to buy The Rovers, and with the money, Becky and Steve decide to start a new life abroad and steal Amy. Jim's attempts to rob a bank fail and they are forced to cancel their plans. Steve calls Social Services to check on Max and they take him into care. Becky believes Tracy made the call and smashes her front room up with a sledge-hammer. Before she can hit Tracy, Steve confesses. Becky walks out on Steve and goes off the rails once more.

Becky, still crushed over her betrayal by Steve, stays with Roy and Hayley. While Fiz Stape (Jennie McAlpine) is in prison, Becky takes part in helping Hayley take care of baby Hope (Harriet Atkins and Sadie Pilbury), whom she grows very close to and struggles to hand her back to Fiz. Becky is upset when she discovers that Tracy is pregnant with Steve's twins. While not wishing for anything bad to happen to the twins, she still knows that any chance of getting back together with Steve is well and truly finished because of this. Becky goes on a business meeting with Steve and attempts to seduce him, while Tracy suffers a miscarriage with Deirdre by her side. Tracy assumes Steve is sleeping with Becky and goes to see her. While at Becky's apartment, Becky admits she still loves Steve and would do anything to get him back. This angers Tracy and she attempts to leave the apartment, an emotional wreck. While leaving, Tracy falls down the stairs. Becky calls the ambulance and when Tracy arrives at the hospital, she tells Steve that she lost the babies because of Becky pushing her down the stairs. Tracy's mother, Deirdre Barlow (Anne Kirkbride) is shocked, knowing that Tracy lost the babies before this incident. Steve believes Tracy. When most of the street turns against Becky, including Roy and Hayley, she is miserable and lonely on Christmas Day. She overhears Steve propose to Tracy which further upsets her. Becky gets drunk by herself in her apartment and burns photographs of her and Steve on their wedding day. While burning the pictures, she falls asleep on the couch and a fire starts in her flat. Becky is saved from the fire by Nick Tilsley (Ben Price) and later vows to gain revenge on Tracy once and for all. Becky begins dating Danny Stratton (Jeremy Sheffield), the man she met at the business meeting with Steve. She gets along perfectly with Danny, as well as his young son, Billy (Wade Sayers). Just as things looked perfect for Becky, Danny reveals that he is moving to Barbados because of his hotel business. When he spots Tracy outside The Rovers, he recognises her and reveals to Becky that Tracy lost the babies before her fall. Gail McIntyre (Helen Worth) helps Becky retrieve Tracy's medical records which confirm she is lying. Gail and the rest of the Platts can't wait to see the smile ripped off of Tracy's face when Becky reveals the medical records, and Becky tells them that she is going to do it on Tracy and Steve's wedding day. Becky exposes Tracy's lies at the wedding reception at The Rovers. Tracy is hysterical, and nobody believes her anymore. After exposing Tracy, she says her goodbyes to Kylie, Roy and Hayley and takes up Danny's offer to fly to Barbados with him. Realising he still loves Becky, Steve tries to stop her, to no avail. Becky boards the flight with Danny and departs. She later becomes engaged to Danny. Becky intends to return to Weatherfield for Kylie's funeral; however, she is unable to make the long trip due to an ear infection. In February 2025, it is revealed Becky is no longer with Danny in Barbados, but is living with someone called Ian in Belize.

== Reception ==
=== Critical response ===
"The Croppers, especially Roy, were the thing that really turned public opinion [about Becky] around to being positive."

— Kelly on Becky's popularity (2009).

The character was praised by Nacro, a crime reduction charity which aims to tackle social exclusion and reintegrate offenders. Kelly was concerned they may find Becky to be a caricature, but was pleased to learn they enjoyed the character being portrayed in a positive light. Media website Digital Spy deemed Kelly a Coronation Street "icon" when the Radio Times had her recreate Manet's famous painting, A Bar at the Folies-Bergère. Kris Green of the same website branded Becky's rampage storyline a repeat of a previous plot in which David Platt (Jack P. Shepherd) smashed up Coronation Street, while Daniel Kilkelly branded Becky a "hellraiser".

TV critic Nancy Banks-Smith praised the character in 2008, calling Becky "the strongest new character since Raquel of blessed memory", while the Daily Mirror's Beth Neil called Becky Coronation Street's "most outrageous character", as well as "one of the soap's most popular characters". Kelly credited the producers' decision to pair her character with Roy and Hayley Cropper as the moment public support for Becky rose, stating: "The Croppers were the making of Becky, and without them I actually don't think Becky would still be in the show. The Croppers, especially Roy, were the thing that really turned public opinion [about Becky] around to being positive." Grace Dent of The Guardian commented on Becky's wedding, describing her appearance as: "[Wearing an] Oil-stained pink princess frock carrying a two-litre bottle of street-drinker fuel, shouting football chants, with the words eruditely swapped to honour the groom. Becky's beehive lurched like a detonated high rise, her lip colour swept westward on to her earlobe, a Regal King Size blazed in her gob." With their wedding ruined, Dent commented that although it was karma, they did not deserve it, because "Viewers want Steve and Becky to be together". Telecommunication company Orange stated that Becky is well known for "her love of cheap cider and Regal King Size's".

Ruth Deller of entertainment website Lowculture often praised Becky in her monthly columns featuring popular and unpopular soap opera characters. Of Becky she stated: "Every scene she's in sparkles and she's been a very welcome presence in the Street this past year or so. Long may Queen Becky reign." Deller also praised her friendship with Claire, branding it as good direction for the characters: "Claire has made the very smart move of becoming mates with HRH Queen Becky recently. This can only be a good thing, as everything Becky touches turns to gold." Francine Cohen of the Daily Mirror commented on Becky's storylines, stating: "Becky's plots have ranged from drug busts to drunken rampages, but the most poignant yet has been her recent pregnancy, miscarriage and subsequent infertility." Channel 5's soap opera reporting website Holy Soap recall Becky's most memorable moment as being her failed wedding attempt, and joked: "She might not remember her first wedding day but we all do!"

The storyline which featured the character's old nemesis DC Hooch drew criticism of Becky's excessive littering of her cigarette butts. Environmental agencies Keep Britain Tidy and CleanupUK commented: "It is disappointing that Coronation Street chooses to allow one of its characters to throw a butt on the floor and suggest that it is okay to treat our streets like a giant ashtray. We understand the writers are concerned with realism but Becky is a role model to many viewers. We all have a responsibility to keep our local area clean and we would hope that producers of programmes such as Coronation Street would support our call to encourage the public to keep our country tidy."

A spokesperson for the show defended Becky's actions, stating that they were portraying the character's high levels of stress realistically. Inside Soap readers voted in a poll to find out which character would be missed the most after they depart. Becky won with sixty per cent of the vote, up against Eve Jenson (Emmerdale) and Ronnie Mitchell (EastEnders). Julie Richardson, writing for Orange U.K., said she "loved a good TV scrap" and the serial had "a corker" with Becky and Kylie's fight, which took place in 2011. Jim Shelley of the Daily Mirror praised Becky's feud with Tracy, explaining it was a "perfectly poised, barbed battle", though he said it was ruined by Kylie's return.

Kevin O'Sullivan of the Sunday Mirror said that Becky had a "seismic departure" as she "checked out of soapland's asylum in characteristically crazy style". He added that "barking Becky" left "hell town Weatherfield" after much soul-searching. O'Sullivan opined that the "corrie cobbles" would not be the same without Becky, although he felt it was a "shame the only storyline she ever had was the stuck record of her rancid relationship with mad Mr McDonald." Christopher Couture, founder of self-titled celebrity gossip blog ChristopherCouture.co.uk, described Kelly as "the new Bet Lynch" on Twitter, following her final episode. Laura Morgan of All About Soap said that Becky's exit will "go down in soap history as one of the best". In September 2012, Inside Soap named Becky's exit as their number 2 happy ending, "Becky believed the world expected the worst of her, and thought it her duty to deliver the goods – generally with a strain of White Diamond cider spending down the front of her wedding dress. Steve loved Becky, but her inability to have kids made her insecure – and Tracy exploited that pain in order to drive the pair apart. Happily, Becky won her revenge in the end, and moved to Barbados with Jeremy Sheffield [who played Danny]. The jammy so-and-so."

=== Accolades ===
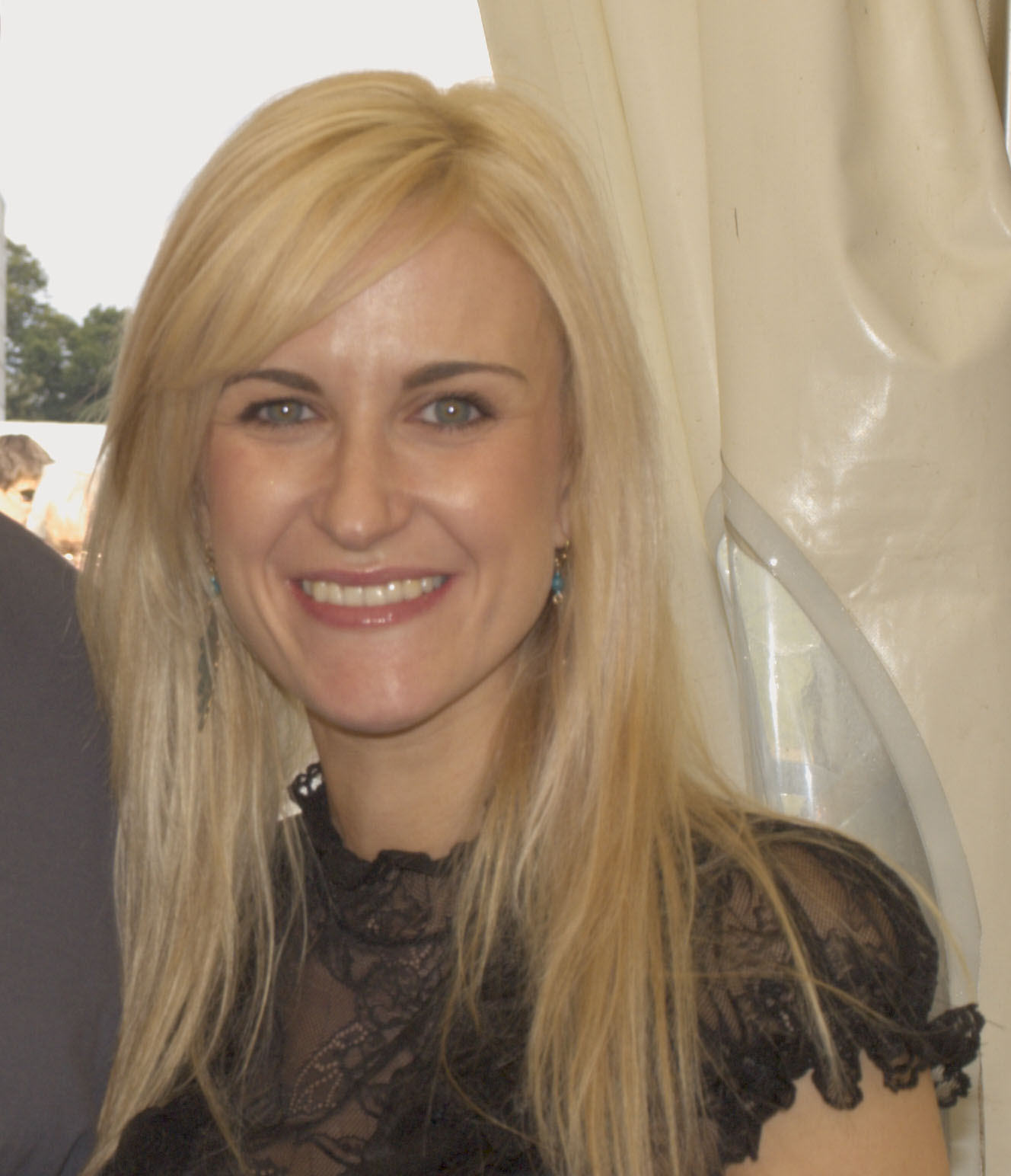
Katherine Kelly (pictured) won various awards for her portrayal of Becky.

Kelly has won and been nominated for a variety of awards for her portrayal of Becky. In 2009, she was named Best Female Soap Star at the TV Now Awards, TV Soap Personality of the Year at the Television and Radio Industries Club awards and Best Actress at the British Soap Awards. At the 2009 TV Choice & TV Quick Awards, Kelly was named Best Actress.

In 2008, Kelly was nominated for the Outstanding Serial Drama Performance award at the National Television Awards. At the British Soap Awards, Kelly was nominated for Best Actress, Best Comedy Performance and Best On-Screen Partnership with Neilson. The following year, she was again nominated for Best On-Screen Partnership, this time with Gregson, and Sexiest Female. At the 2009 "Inside Soap Awards", Kelly received a nomination for Best Actress. The following year at the Inside Soap Awards, Kelly was nominated for Best Actress, while Becky and Steve were nominated for Best Wedding. In 2010, Kelly was nominated for Serial Drama Performance at the National Television Awards. The same year saw Kelly and co-star Gregson win the Bride And Doom partnership award at the All About Soap Awards. Kelly also garnered nominations for Best On-Screen Partnership (with Gregson) and Best Actress at the British Soap Awards. In February 2011, Kelly was nominated for Best Actress at the Soap Bubbles Awards. Kelly was again nominated for Best Actress at the 2011 British Soap Awards. At the TVTimes Corrie Awards, Becky and Steve were nominated in the category of Best Couple, while Becky herself was nominated for Best Female Character". In January 2012, Kelly won the award for Best Serial Performance at the National Television Awards. In April 2012, Kelly won the award for Best Exit at the 2012 British Soap Awards, while 'Becky's Final Farewell' was voted best single episode.
