= List of Emmerdale producers =

Emmerdale logo.

Emmerdale (known as Emmerdale Farm until 1989) is a British soap opera first broadcast on ITV on 16 October 1972. The soap was initially headed by executive producer Peter Holmans, who gave Emmerdale Farm a reputation for being a "sleepy soap" where not much happened. Holmans and other early executive producers focused on rural life and the events of the Sugden family, but in the late 1980s, Keith Richardson and a new team of producers became responsible for revamping the soap. Richardson and his team saw Emmerdale Farm move to a later transmission time, more dramatic storylines and a title change to Emmerdale, which resulted in the soap gaining viewers and becoming a major UK soap opera. In 2013, Kate Oates became the series producer of the soap and she expressed her aim to feature more of the countryside settings as seen in the earlier episodes, as well as add a balance to the soap's storylines rather than focus on a few dramatic storylines.

Jane Hudson was the executive producer of Emmerdale from 2018 to 2023. She was replaced internally by Iain Macleod, who was promoted from Coronation Street's executive producer to overseeing both soaps. At the same time, former producer Sophie Roper was reappointed as a producer. She confirmed a new era for Emmerdale from 2024, with cast changes and "bold and ground-breaking drama".

== Executive producers ==
| # | Executive producer | Tenure | Ref. |
|---|---|---|---|
| 1 | Peter Holmans | 1972–1973 | |
| 2 | David Cunliffe | 1975–1979 | |
| 3 | Anne W. Gibbons | 1980 | |
| 4 | Michael Glynn | 1980–1986 | |
| 5 | Keith Richardson | 1986–2009 | |
| 6 | Steve Frost | 2009–2012 | |
| 7 | Jane Hudson | 2018–2023 | |
| 8 | Iain MacLeod | 2024–2025 | |

== Series producers ==
| # | Series producer | Tenure | Ref. |
|---|---|---|---|
| 1 | David Goddard | 1972–1973 | |
| 2 | Peter Holmans | 1973 | |
| 3 | Robert D. Cardona | 1973–1976 | |
| 4 | Anne W. Gibbons | 1980–1983 | |
| 5 | Richard Handford | 1983–1986 | |
| 6 | Michael Russell | 1986–1988 | |
| 7 | Stuart Doughty | 1988–1991 | |
| 8 | Morag Bain | 1992–1993 | |
| 9 | Nicholas Prosser | 1993–1994 | |
| 10 | Mervyn Watson | 1994–1998 | |
| 11 | Kieran Roberts | 1998–2001 | |
| 12 | Steve Frost | 2001–2005 | |
| 13 | Kathleen Beedles | 2005–2008 | |
| 14 | Anita Turner | 2008–2009 | |
| 15 | Gavin Blyth | 2009–2011 | |
| 16 | Stuart Blackburn | 2011–2013 | |
| 17 | Kate Oates | 2013–2016 | |
| 18 | Iain MacLeod | 2016–2018 | |
| 19 | Kate Brooks | 2018 | |

== Producers ==
| # | Producer | Tenure | Ref. |
|---|---|---|---|
| 1 | Kate Brooks | 2018–2024 | |
| 2 | Laura Shaw | 2018–present | |
| 3 | Sophie Roper | 2021, 2024–2025, 2026–present | |
| 4 | Hannah Cheers | 2023 | |

== Creative Directors ==
| No. | Creative Director | Tenure |
|---|---|---|
| 1 | Iain MacLeod | 2025 – present |
