= Paula Lane =

English actress (born 1986)

- Born: 17 April 1986 (age 40); Hebden Bridge, West Yorkshire, England
- Education: Royal Central School of Speech and Drama
- Occupation: Actress
- Years active: 2008–present
- Known for: Coronation Street; Emmerdale
- Spouse: Tom Shaw (m. 2014)
- Children: 2

Paula Lane (born 17 April 1986) is an English actress. She is best known for portraying the roles of Kylie Platt in the ITV soap opera Coronation Street (2010–2016), and Ella Forster in another ITV soap opera, Emmerdale (2024–2025).

== Early life ==
Lane is originally from Hebden Bridge near Halifax. Lane attended Halifax Catholic High School and then Huddersfield Technical College. At the age of 19 she was accepted to train at the prestigious Central School of Speech and Drama in London, graduating in 2008 with a 1st class honours degree in acting. On finishing drama school, Lane was cast immediately in the ITV 1960s-based drama Heartbeat where she made her television debut playing a teacher, Wendy Kelshaw, in the episode "School Of Hard Knocks".

== Career ==
Lane's other appearances include Sky's TV adaptation of Going Postal by Terry Pratchett, The Royal, Doctors and BBC's Call the Midwife. Lane was also featured in the short film War Wounds alongside Stephen Mangan. In 2024 Lane joined Emmerdale, playing character Ella Forster.

=== Coronation Street ===
Lane joined Coronation Street in 2010, portraying Kylie Platt, half-sister of established character Becky McDonald (Katherine Kelly).

She departed her role as Kylie Platt in 2014, when she left for maternity leave. Lane returned in June 2015. On 9 February 2016, it was confirmed that Lane was to leave for maternity leave for her second pregnancy but this time she would not be returning and she would leave the soap permanently. Her character was killed off in episodes aired on 15 July 2016. The last episode in which she appeared aired on 20 July 2016.

=== Theatre ===
Lane has also acted in several stage productions. She has played the role of Rachel in Be More Martyn at Hope Mill Theater in Manchester, Lily in The Bengal Lily at Manchester Royal Exchange, Lauren in the UK tour of Kinky Boots. and most recently appeared in Road at Oldham Coliseum.

== Personal life ==
Lane married her long-term partner Tom Shaw in May 2014 at Leeds Cathedral. They have a son and a daughter. Tom has also appeared in Coronation Street in 2017 and 2018 as Kim Vaughan on a recurring basis.

== Filmography ==
Year	Title	Role	Notes
2008, 2011	The Royal	Geraldine	2 episodes
2009	Heartbeat	Wendy Kelshaw	Episode: "School of Hard Knocks"
2009	Doctors	Anna Copping	Episode: "Tracing the Lines"
2010	War Wounds	Nurse Gemma	Short film
2010	Going Postal	Princess	Television film
2010–2016	Coronation Street	Kylie Platt	616 episodes
2021	Call the Midwife	Vera Sands	
2022	Father Brown	Emily Harris	Series 9
2023	City 17	Chell	Series 24
2024–2025	Emmerdale	Ella Forster	Regular role

== Awards and nominations ==
Year	Award	Category	Work	Result	Ref.
2011	16th National Television Awards	Best Newcomer	Coronation Street	Nominated	
2011	All About Soap Bubble Awards	Best Newcomer	Coronation Street	Nominated	
2011	The British Soap Awards	Villain of the Year	Coronation Street	Nominated	
2011	The British Soap Awards	Best Newcomer	Coronation Street	Nominated	
2011	TV Choice Awards	Best Soap Newcomer	Coronation Street	Won	
2011	Inside Soap Awards	Best Newcomer	Coronation Street	Shortlisted	
2012	Inside Soap Awards	Best Bitch	Coronation Street	Shortlisted	
2013	Inside Soap Awards	Best Actress	Coronation Street	Nominated	
2014	19th National Television Awards	Serial Drama Performance	Coronation Street	Nominated	
2014	Inside Soap Awards	Best Actress	Coronation Street	Nominated	
2015	20th National Television Awards	Serial Drama Performance	Coronation Street	Nominated	
2016	21st National Television Awards	Serial Drama Performance	Coronation Street	Nominated	
2016	2016 British Soap Awards	Best Actress	Coronation Street	Nominated	
2016	TV Choice Awards	Best Soap Actress	Coronation Street	Shortlisted	
2016	Inside Soap Awards	Best Actress	Coronation Street	Shortlisted	
2024	Inside Soap Awards	Best Newcomer	Emmerdale	Nominated	
