= Kylie Platt =

Fictional character from Coronation Street

- Coronation Street character
- Portrayed by: Paula Lane
- Duration: 2010–2016
- First appearance: 26 August 2010
- Last appearance: 20 July 2016
- Introduced by: Phil Collinson
- Spin-off appearances: Where's Kylie? (2012)
In-universe information
- Other names: Kylie Turner
- Occupation: Waitress; Nail Technician
- Father: Brian Turner
- Mother: Cath Granger
- Half-sisters: Becky McDonald
- Husband: David Platt (2011–2016)
- Sons: Max Turner
- Daughters: Lily Platt

Kylie Platt (also Turner) is a fictional character from the British ITV soap opera Coronation Street, played by Paula Lane. She was introduced as Becky McDonald's (Katherine Kelly) half-sister, making her on-screen debut on 26 August 2010. Lane landed the role, with executive producer Phil Collinson describing her as a brilliant casting. He also revealed that Kylie would have "major storylines" during her first six months in the serial. Lane created her approach to her portrayal from her own past experiences whilst growing up. Lane impressed the producers and had her contract extended until July 2012.

Kylie's backstory includes growing up in a broken home, living below the poverty threshold, and weak relationships with her estranged mother and sister. Kylie is characterised through her "full on personality" and has a feisty attitude. She has often been described as a "gobby female" who wants a better life and ultimately she is driven by money. Kylie has a son, Max Turner (Harry McDermott), who was placed into foster care. She had the child at a young age and she was not ready for the responsibility. Becky helps Kylie retrieve custody of Max. In one of her first big storyline arcs, Kylie sells her son to Becky for £20,000. The storyline was branded controversial by media outlets and Lane found it hard to compress her emotions whilst filming the plot. Lane said Kylie's sheer audacity was highlighted when she dared to blackmail her barren sister for more cash.

Kylie remained off-screen for episodic blocks in her first six months. Producers devised a storyline to give her permanent residence on Coronation Street, when she was revealed as the fiancée of David Platt (Jack P. Shepherd). The development was to offer viewers "something new" and both actors have praised their pairing as a positive move. The storyline played the resurgence of Kylie's love of money. Kylie has also engaged in feuds with Gail and Tina McIntyre, played by Helen Worth and Michelle Keegan respectively. Gail's attempt to sabotage her son's wedding to Kylie proved unsuccessful. It was a change in direction for the character, with the lure of money insufficient for her to leave "someone she loves". Lane took maternity leave in late 2014 and Kylie was off-screen from December 2014 until June 2015. In February 2016, Lane announced her decision to leave Coronation Street. She filmed her final scenes as Kylie in June 2016 after producers decided to kill the character off. Kylie was murdered by Clayton Hibbs (Callum Harrison) while trying to protect her friend Gemma Winter (Dolly-Rose Campbell) in the episode broadcast on 15 July 2016. Lane last appeared as Kylie on 20 July 2016, where she appeared as a corpse.

Kylie has been well received by most critics for her image as a "gobby chav". The general reaction to her pairing with David has also been positive. Lane won Best Newcomer at the 2011 National Television Awards for her portrayal. She also garnered other nominations in awards ceremonies oriented to magazines.

== Creation ==
=== Casting ===
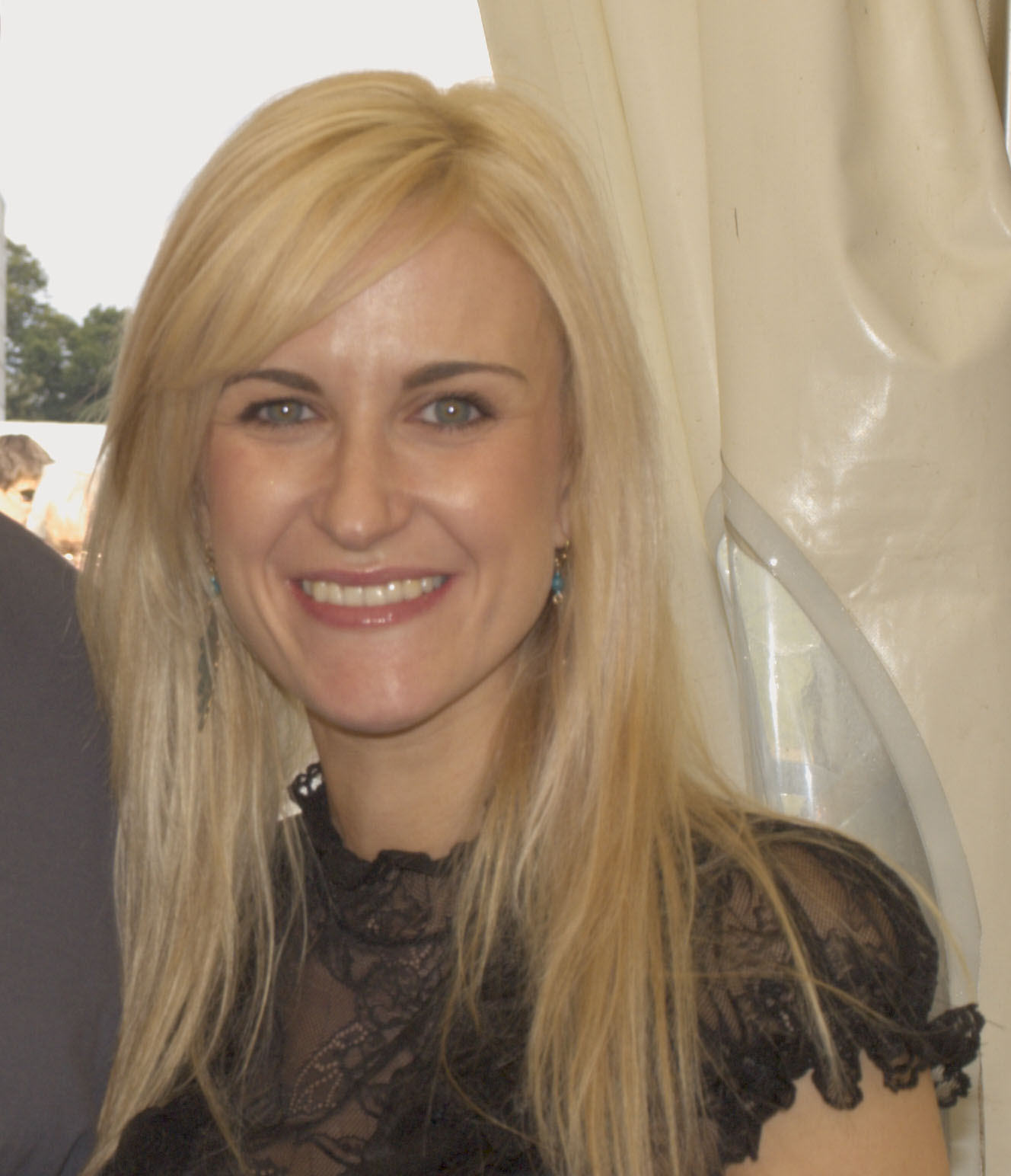
Katherine Kelly (pictured) plays Kylie's half-sister Becky McDonald.

Kylie was created as the "tearaway" half-sister of established character Becky McDonald (Katherine Kelly). Actress Paula Lane was cast in the role and immediately received praise from executive producer Phil Collinson who described her as "brilliant". Lane has stated she draws inspiration from her own past, as an angle to portray Kylie. Lane's first scenes aired on 26 August 2010. Lane later signed a new contract with the serial, which was later extended and meant Kylie would stay into July 2012.

=== Characterisation ===
Kylie was initially described as having a "full on" personality, similar to Becky. She was also labelled a "firecracker". Lane described her as a "messed up girl, dragged up by an alcoholic mother". In her life she had to "fight for survival". Lane has also expressed her admiration of Kylie's "comedy". She has also said Kylie is "quite witty" and amid confrontation is "quick off the mark and won't let someone stamp her down." Viewers of the serial later observed Kylie to be as evil as Tracy Barlow (Kate Ford). Lane said that the comparison was taken too far because Kylie has not murdered anyone, although she acknowledged that Kylie comes across as evil. She also stated: "Kylie will be a thorn in Becky and Steve's sides for a long time to come".

Kylie and Becky's characterisation and backstory are similar. Lane felt it was important to portray certain differences between the two. This was to prevent the audience becoming bored through repetition. This was done through Kylie making the opposite choice Becky would make. Lane describes Kylie's redeeming qualities the fact she is "bright and she's a grafter."

== Development ==
=== Introduction and selling Max ===
Upon her introduction, Kylie was described as being a big character in her first six months of storylines. When she arrives she ruins Becky and Steve McDonald's (Simon Gregson) plans for adoption. Kylie and Becky violently clash over the incident, and Lane received bruising from filming the scenes. The scenes were so violent that they were toned down before transmission. Lane said that the fight was her favourite set of scenes for Kylie. Kelly described Kylie and Becky as having a love-hate relationship, but at the time Becky "wants to kill her". Lane also sees Kylie as a "mixed-up girl", stating that she feels sorry for her. Lane herself stated that Kylie loves her sister but "feels resentful" that Becky left home when Kylie was only eight. "Becky was like a mother to Kylie."

It is then revealed that Kylie has a son, Max (Harry McDermott), who is in foster care. Lane said that this happened because Kylie "was drinking with his dad and not looking after him". Kylie loves Max but is too "young and naive" too cope with motherhood. Kylie snatches Max while on a visit; Lane opined it was a spur of the moment decision, but "she couldn't bear to lose him". Becky helps Kylie regain custody of him. The "turning point" in the storyline was attributed to scenes in which Kylie stands up in court and vows to change. Lane said that they were "touching" scenes, which included a rare moment in which Kylie applauds Becky for being "a great sister". Lane stated that when she gets Max back, Kylie takes advantage of Becky. In another storyline Kylie makes a pass at Steve. Gregson who plays him opined that in Kylie's mind she thought "that fat bald guy wants a bit". He also said that Steve was "extremely shocked" but was not interested. Steve decides not to say anything to Becky because he doesn't trust Kylie and knows that she will take Max away from Becky. Gregson said that in Steve's opinion "she's been trouble from the start and he's sure that's not going to change."

Kylie plays on the fact that Becky is desperate for a child and offers to sell Max to her. Gregson said that he felt it immoral to buy a child, but stressed "Kylie isn't an ordinary mother – she only cares about herself." He said that Steve believes Max would be better off with Steve and Becky. Steve is the first to take Kylie seriously; Gregson believed this was because Kylie has "proved herself ruthless" and "not the best mum". Lane defended Kylie's actions because she did "love her son", but she makes the money-making scam because she is "immature and irresponsible". Lane herself was so shocked by the storyline that it made her overemotional on set, to the point where she had to take breaks from filming scenes. After selling Max for twenty thousand pounds, Kylie travels abroad, but later reappears during the serial's live episode. She demands more money, which Becky has to steal.

=== Marriage to David Platt ===
In early 2010 Jack P. Shepherd, who plays fellow character David Platt, revealed his desire for more scenes with Lane as he thought that they worked well together. In January 2011 it was announced that Kylie would marry David in a "shock storyline". Revealing the news whilst interviewed on talk show Loose Women, Lane said that the pair would meet off-screen in Tenerife. Though she had not read the scripts, Lane thought they would be "a really good combination". Coronation Street publicity said it would make "exciting viewing" for fans. They further stated: "Kylie and David are trouble as individuals so the thought of the two of them getting together is a nightmare prospect for both their families [...] there is no end to the trouble they will cause for everyone." Lane also revealed that the storyline was implemented because there was no other plausible way for Kylie to return. They did not carry on with the scenario with Becky and Steve, because the viewers needed "something new". Lane was happy with the direction of the storyline because it paved the way for more "explosive" material. Kylie was also tipped to be the one in control of the relationship. She also acknowledged that certain aspects of their relationship would mirror Becky and Steve's relationship, in the sense that when Kylie is with David, a "loved up" nicer side to Kylie surfaces.

"They work very much in sync with each other and know what the other one is thinking. When one comes up with an idea that's a little bit mischievous, the other gets it straight away and they egg each other on. They could be very happy together and living in wedded bliss, but everyone around them may not feel the same way about their relationship because they do everything for their own benefit and not for other people!"

— Paula Lane on Kylie and David's dynamic.

David's mother Gail McIntyre (Helen Worth) is shocked to learn the identity of his mystery fiancée, and disapproves of Kylie. The pair repeatedly clash in scenes that serve as comic relief. Gail dislikes Kylie because she "knows her type", and the fact that she is related to Becky does not bode well. Lane said that Gail's reaction was understandable because Kylie is not the epitome of "the perfect daughter-in-law." She added that because Gail is so possessive of David, "it doesn't bode well for the future." Shepherd added that they are "the match made in hell" and revealed that David lets her do as she pleases because he is in love with her. He later said that David appeared obsessed and shared the similar dynamic he had with previous girlfriend Tina McIntyre (Michelle Keegan). He concluded: "I think he's keener on her than she is on him." David fools Kylie into believing he owns a salon. Lane explained "Kylie sees an opportunity for a better life, but not in a money-grubbing, scheming way. She does love David, and she's not doing anything wrong." Kylie sees the situation as an "added bonus". After Kylie finds out the truth, the pair come up with a plan to "wheedle" his grandmother Audrey Roberts' (Sue Nicholls) salon off her.

Gail tries to use the fact that Kylie gave Max up against her. Lane revealed that it did not work because Kylie revealed her past hardships and gained sympathy from David. The scenes also offered viewers the chance to gain a better perspective on who Kylie is and learn about her past. The night before their wedding, Gail unsuccessfully tries to pay Kylie one thousand pounds to leave for good. Lane said that Kylie had the audacity to come back after "£25K for Max" so "£1000 to give up a salon and someone she loves is nothing", though she still keeps the money. Up until this point Kylie had been "playing the game with Gail", but she was not on "Kylie's radar". Kylie then realises how determined Gail is to ruin her wedding. Lane said "Gail has taken a pretty intense disliking to Kylie, so of course Kylie is going to fight her corner—that's the kind of girl she is."

When the pair marry, Lane described them as still being on the "honeymoon period", equating to more lust than love. She opined that the serial had developed a "lovely relationship" which had "explosive chemistry". David decides Kylie should have Max back. Lane explained that it was not the right time because Kylie still wasn't ready for responsibility. Kylie "doesn't want to mess with the little boy's head anymore" and accepts he is safe with Becky. However David is "inquisitive" about the situation, but Kylie "brushes over" the hurt she really feels.

=== Friendship with Eva Price ===
In July 2011, Lane revealed that Kylie will start a friendship with Eva Price (Catherine Tyldesley). Lane said Eva would feature in "lighter" storylines with Kylie and that viewers will see a happy side to Kylie as Eva "becomes her sidekick". She also added that herself and Tyldesley are a "nightmare" on set saying that they "laugh a lot".

=== Affair with Nick Tilsley ===
Producers created an infidelity story for the character which involved David's half-brother Nick Tilsley (Ben Price). David discovers the truth but decides not to let Kylie know. Shepherd told Alison Gardner from What's on TV that David thinks if he confronts Kylie their relationship will end. He has to decide who should be punished for the affair. He decides that Nick is to blame and if he is to get revenge on him then Kylie must remain oblivious. He then contemplates committing suicide and then vandalises Nick's flat. The actor concluded that David could forgive Kylie for her infidelity.

David begins by sending poison pen letters to Nick's wife Leanne Battersby (Jane Danson), which state that Nick is having an affair. Nick realises David is behind the letters. Price told Kilkelly (Digital Spy) his character panics and becomes annoyed. Nick is arrogant to his actions and believes David will just forgive him because they are related. He then tells David that they should discuss the affair with Kylie and move on. Price explained that David is worried that Kylie will feel betrayed he knew all along and does not want her to leave him. He decides he must stop Nick and grabs the steering wheel and causes a car crash. Price believed David was not trying to murder Nick, just prevent him from contacting Kylie.

Kylie begins to suspect that David intentionally caused the crash out of revenge. Kylie gain evidence and confronts David over his scheming at Lily's christening. Filipa Jodelka of The Guardian observed that "David's family went on to pronounce him wicked and cast him out into darkness." Writers kept the paternity of Kylie's baby a secret up until birth. On-screen the child, named Lily, has a paternity test taken in which it is revealed that David is her biological father. David then boasts about the result to Nick to cause further trouble. Producer Stuart Blackburn said that he used the story to "push Kylie to the edge". It also created the opportunity for writers to revisit David's bad persona. He said the revelation damages their relationship but his team were keeping the possibility of the pair reuniting. Kylie is angry at herself and David. Blackburn explained "in her head she's a screw-up, and she'll be furious with herself for imagining she could ever have a normal life. If there's hope for Kylie and David, they must accept each other for who they really are."

=== Prescription drug addiction ===
In June 2014, Lane announced that she was pregnant and Kylie would be written out of the show while the actress took maternity leave. Coronation Street producer Stuart Blackburn met with Lane and devised an exit storyline. He had already planned a story for the character and Lane said her departure added more scope and improved the story.

To prepare for the storyline Lane discussed her character's backstory with directors. She recalled that Kylie had previously suffered addiction which adds to the drama. Writers devised "heavy scripts" for Lane and she had to thoroughly research the issue. Lane hoped the story would raise awareness and also convey that ADHD is not a disease. After the story was broadcast, Lane has explained that Kylie blamed herself for Max's ADHD. She believes her past actions have contributed to his behavioural issues and she refuses to listen to reassurance from her family. The actress blamed Kylie's "very low self-esteem" as a mother and she thinks other residents are judging her. Kylie becomes stressed with managing Max's condition and looking after Lily. She wants to feel calm after working herself into a "tired and frustrated" state. She takes his medication thinking it will calm her down but she regrets her actions.

Kylie locates Max's father Callum Logan (Sean Ward) to find answers about his ADHD. She finds it exciting revisiting her old neighbourhood. After the Platt family block her access to Max's medication, Kylie buys amphetamine from Callum. Lane told Kilkelly that the drug gives her a similar effect and she is after a quick drug fix following withdrawals from Max's medication. Off-screen, the actress met with a recovering drug addict and discussed the mental and psychological effects of amphetamine addition, which aided her portrayal of Kylie's struggle. Lane explained that the addiction would intensify and result in "another downward spiral" for the character. She added "I think this is the darkest place that Kylie has ever found herself in." Kylie's addiction begins to effect her home life as she becomes "tired, grumpy and agitated". David notices her strange behaviour and it causes problems. Kylie is caught taking drugs and given an ultimatum to choose her family or her addiction. She tries to abstain but Callum makes it difficult for her by offering her free drugs. He makes it clear he is not interested in Max and just wants Kylie. Lane described Callum as having "a very dark presence" in Kylie's life.

Lane's temporary departure scenes aired on Christmas Day 2014. The festive episode included David witnessing Callum trying to give Kylie drugs. He is furious and throws her out of their home. She decides to leave the area and her family. Blackburn then announced that upon the character's return she would need to change her ways. He explained that the consequences of Kylie's drug taking cause a custody battle for Max between David and Callum. The producer added "she's going to have to get her act together, she really is." Lane returned to filming as Kylie in April 2015. On-screen Kylie returns and reunites with David to strengthen his claim of custody over Max.

=== Callum Logan's murder ===
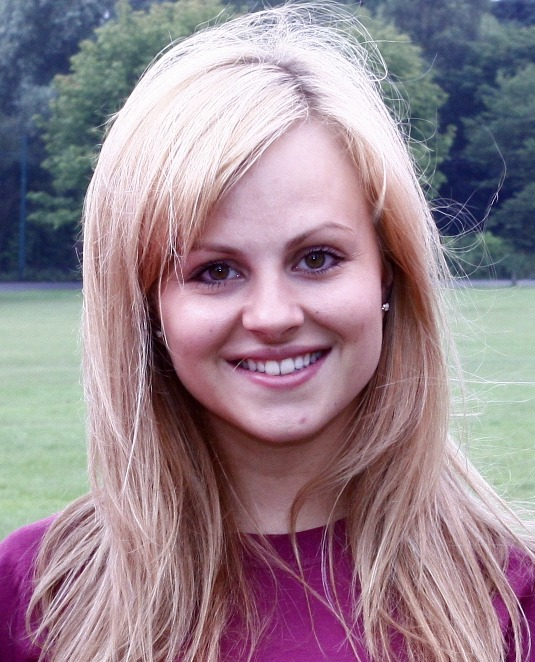
Tina O'Brien (pictured) plays Kylie's sister-in-law Sarah Platt. Kylie murders Callum Logan (Sean Ward) in order to protect the character.

Coronation Street aired a special live episode to celebrate the sixtieth anniversary of ITV. In the episode Callum and Kylie's sister-in-law Sarah Platt (Tina O'Brien) argue inside the Platt's home. Callum attacks Sarah, overpowers her and threatens her life. Kylie walks in on the struggle and hits Callum over the head with a wrench. Her actions left Callum bloody and dead on her kitchen floor. The live episode concluded with David returning home to the fatal scene. He decides to help Kylie and Sarah to conceal Callum's murder. He wraps the body up and puts him down a manhole in their garage. The following episode features the trio plotting to dispose of Callum's body in a public space. An ongoing conversion of the garage in a bedroom extension poses a problem and they need to move quickly, but a series of events ruin their plans. Kylie and David are physically sick when they first try to remove the body from the manhole. They are later interrupted by a visit from the police who investigate Callum's abandoned car. Gail then hires Jason Grimshaw (Ryan Thomas) to cover up the manhole with concrete, unaware Callum is concealed inside.

Lane assessed that her character "cracks" during the storyline and each character handles Callum's murder differently. Sarah becomes hysterical, David stays calm and scheming, whereas Kylie remained in a state of shock and she had to "strip [her performance] right back". The story played out with David attempting to help Sarah and Kylie move on. As Lane noted, the characters turn on each other and "it just becomes one big crazy fight for survival, it's a mess." They feel trapped within the secret and the situation get out of control. Writers continued to play on the tense situation, using Kylie and Callum's old friend Gemma Winter (Dolly-Rose Campbell).

The show planned a dramatic stunt which would lead to the discovery of Callum's body. The scene featured Carla Connor (Alison King) causing a car accident, colliding with Tyrone Dobbs' (Alan Halsall) pick-up truck which smashes into the Platt's home. This causes the floor to give way and a recovery team unearthing Callum's body. Producers decided to conclude the story without Kylie being held accountable for the murder. Instead they used a character that had been recently killed off, Tony Stewart (Terence Maynard), who had publicly feuded with Callum. When Sarah confesses the truth to Todd Grimshaw (Bruno Langley), he decides to frame Tony for the crime–a scheme which proved successful.

=== Departure and death ===
In February 2016, it was announced that Paula Lane had decided to leave Coronation Street to concentrate on other aspects of her life. Lane said it was a difficult decision to make and expressed her enjoyment of her time with the show. The actress had long been open about her career aspirations away from the show. She explained that six years had been enough time to make an impact on the show but avoided her becoming typecast as Kylie Platt. Lane was pregnant and was scheduled to finish filming in June 2016. Coronation Street's producer Stuart Blackburn described Lane as "talented and dedicated" and expressed his view that she had created an "unforgettable Corrie character".

On 2 July 2016, the show publicised that the character would be killed off. The show's producers decided to keep detail of how Kylie would die a secret. But Kilkelly of Digital Spy described it as "tragic". Kylie decides she can no longer live in the house where Callum died and convinces David that they must move away. The reporter added that the Platt family would not succeed in their move because Kylie would die in a "storyline twist". The following day Coronation Street released promotional images depicting David mourning Kylie over her open coffin. Lane described Kylie's death as one of the "most shocking" ever featured on the show. Shepherd described it as a "harrowing exit" for the character, at which he and Lane cried uncontrollably. He added that writers warned him in advance that it would be "very harrowing and emotional". Newspaper photographs later revealed Kylie would die on Coronation Street. The picture showed her body being clutched in David's arms. Kylie's death scenes occurred following her decision to defend Gemma after she is attacked by Clayton Hibbs (Callum Harrison). He turns on Kylie and stabs her and she dies in the street with David by her side. The death scene led many viewers to mourn the on-screen death of the fictional character, via social media website Twitter. Though some viewers complained about a bloody stabbing airing before the 21:00 broadcasting watershed.

== Storylines ==
Becky confronts Kylie after a bad reference that she provided to an adoption agency. At first, Kylie pretends that she has a privileged life in order to impress Becky but it soon emerges that she is on the streets. She then moves into the Rovers Return Inn and instantaneously sparks a conflict with Michelle Connor (Kym Marsh). Becky and Steve soon discover that she has a four-year-old son called Max, whose custody she seeks. She sells Steve's motorbike and tries to sleep with him. After visiting Max at the foster parents' home, she takes him home. She sleeps with Gary Windass (Mikey North). Kylie is awarded custody of her son. Later she steals money from the till at Roy's Rolls, and jets off to Cyprus on holiday and leaves Max in Becky's care. She returns a couple of weeks later with a new boyfriend, Demetri. She tells Becky that she has come back to take Max to live in Cyprus, leaving Becky heartbroken. Kylie sees Becky's desperation as she cannot have children and offers to give Max to her in exchange for £20,000. Becky complies and Kylie leaves.

Max goes missing when a tram crashes into Coronation Street. Becky is hysterical with worry, after hours of searching, Kylie turns up at the Rovers revealing that she had Max all along. Kylie reveals that she has already spent the £20,000 in "investments" and that if they want to keep Max, they must pay her an extra £5,000. Becky goes behind Steve's back by stealing the money from Dev Alahan's corner shop. She gives the money to Kylie and tells her that if she goes anywhere near Becky or Max again, she will kill her. Kylie returns as the fiancée of David Platt, whom she met in Tenerife. Kylie enjoys winding his mother Gail up. Kylie is delighted when David's grandmother Audrey agrees to sign her salon over to him. Later after a row with her mother-in-law Liz, Becky attacks and beats up both Kylie and her fiancé David Platt in their own home.

On Kylie's hen night, Gail pays her £1,000 of Nick's (Ben Price) money to not marry David; Gail thinks that it has worked when Kylie does not arrive for the wedding. Just as Gail is about to tell David that Kylie has "cold feet", Kylie bursts into the room "dressed to the nines" in a red and black dress. She and David get married, much to Gail's and Nick's annoyance, and she becomes Mrs David Platt. She keeps the money that Gail has paid her and tells everyone that it was a gift from Gail to pay for her and David's honeymoon. Kylie admits to social services that Becky and Steve paid her £25,000 to keep Max. She later teases Tina because Graeme Proctor (Craig Gazey) dumped Tina for Xin Proctor (Elizabeth Tan) by playing Japanese music, noting Xin's nationality, and Tina attacks Kylie. David goes on a hairdressing course and Kylie causes trouble for his family. She seduces a random man and begins feuding with Gail. She then blackmails Audrey because her boyfriend Marc Selby (Andrew Hall) is a transvestite.

Kylie changes her attitude and forms friendships with David's family. She gets drunk and sleeps with David's brother, Nick. When David discovers the truth he takes revenge in several minor ways, which increase in seriousness, until Nick confronts him while they are driving, and David accidentally causes a car crash which leaves Nick with brain damage. When the truth is revealed Kylie throws David out and ends their relationship. David makes an effort to change, then proves to Kylie that he can be trusted and they reconcile. Kylie starts taking painkillers more often and begins taking drugs. Her behaviour becomes increasingly out of control and David confronts her. He issues her an ultimatum that she must choose between her family and drugs. Kylie decides to leave and stops all contact with David and her children. Max's father Callum arrives and demands contact with his son. Kylie returns after months living away wanting to make amends and have access to Max and Lily. David lets her move back in to strengthen his claim to Max and prevent Callum from gaining custody. David later decides to forgive Kylie.

Callum's presence causes countless problems for the Platt family. His court proceedings cause the feud to heighten to violence. He also manipulates David's sister Sarah and gets her daughter Bethany into trouble with drugs. Callum attacks Sarah for framing him for a crime, and she is in serious danger when Kylie arrives; she hits Callum with a tool and kills him. She, Sarah and David bury Callum in a manhole under their home. They pretend to know nothing about Callum's disappearance and try to continue with their lives. A car crash occurs and a large vehicle smashes into their home leading to the discovery of Callum's body. Kylie and David try to convince Sarah to keep up their pretence and deny all knowledge of his murder. Tony Stewart, who had recently died, is blamed for the murder and David helps manipulate the situation so that police also believe the theory. Kylie decides that she cannot bring her children up in the home she killed Callum. She convinces David to permanently move to Barbados to be with her sister, Becky. To celebrate, Kylie goes to the pub to collect champagne. She hears an argument and decides to investigate. She is shocked to find Gemma being attacked by Clayton and decides to intervene. He reacts by stabbing Kylie and she begins to bleed uncontrollably. David rushes to her aid and an ambulance is called. She acknowledges she is dying and says her goodbyes to David and Gail. David refuses to say his goodbyes as Kylie takes her last breaths and makes David promise to be a good father to Max. She then dies in David's arms, leaving him devastated.

Six years later when David discovers Max's actions including spiking a drink at Amy, he believes that he let Kylie down by her promise.

== Reception ==
Lane won Best Newcomer at the 2011 National Television Awards for her portrayal of Kylie. In February 2011, she was nominated for Best Actress in the 2011 All About Soap Bubble Awards. Kylie was nominated in the category of "Villain of the Year" at the 2011 Inside Soap Awards. Digital Spy chose the moment Kylie reveals Max is her son as their "Picture of the day". Sue Crawford of the Daily Mirror describes Kylie as a "seducer, brawler, thief and seller of her own son" and said that she is "one seriously troubled girl". Tony Stewart of the same publication said that the Kylie and David pairing was "brilliant". He also branded Kylie as "the ultimate chav" and a "gobby girl". Susan Hill of the Daily Star similarly called her a "gobby chav". Mandy Appleyard writing for television magazine Buzz said "conniving Kylie" has done some dreadful things since arriving. She added that between Kylie and David they had "seduced, brawled, lied, blackmailed, stolen and cheated, neither of them are perfect but together, they truly are perfect."

Julie Richardson writing for Orange U.K. said she "loves a good TV scrap" and the serial had "a corker" with Becky and Kylie's fight. She also branded Kylie a "low-life". Tony Stewart of the Daily Mirror said that Kylie was right to taunt Tina as a loser. Though when Tina attacked her, he quipped that she should have kept "her chav trap shut and not wind up the fiery girl". Stewart's Daily Mirror colleague Jim Shelley bemoaned Kylie's return because it "absolutely ruined" Becky's feud with Tracy.

Duncan Lindsay from Metro praised the Kylie's departure and the on-screen events that lead up to the moment. They branded the character's death "harrowing, moving and memorable, the drama proved just how right soaps can get it." Sophie Dainty (Digital Spy) said the scenes were some of the most heart-breaking the show had ever aired. Jade Pike writing for the Liverpool Echo called it a highly anticipated departure with viewers. They described "an emotional roller coaster of a night as Kylie Platt appeared on the cobbles for the last time." A reporter writing for the Inside Soap Yearbook described Kylie and David's "final moments together" as "very emotional". Kym Marsh praised the scenes where Kylie died and described her death as "really sad". In 2023, Susannah Alexander from Digital Spy called Kylie "tragic" and "troublesome".
