= Karl Munro =

Fictional character from Coronation Street

- Coronation Street character
- Portrayed by: John Michie
- Duration: 2011–2013
- First appearance: Episode 7627; 17 June 2011
- Last appearance: Episode 8213; 13 September 2013
- Introduced by: Phil Collinson
In-universe information
- Occupation: Taxi Driver; Barman; Pub Landlord
- Wife: Stella Price (2013)
- Stepdaughters: Eva Price; Leanne Battersby

Karl Munro is a fictional character from the British ITV soap opera Coronation Street, played by John Michie. Michie's casting was announced in April 2011. He signed an initial one-year contract and began filming his scenes in May. Upon joining the cast, Michie was told that producers would initially "bed [him] in", before increasing his involvement in the show in 2012. Michie is from Scotland, but because Coronation Street is set in Manchester, he uses a Mancunian accent for the role. Karl was introduced along with his girlfriend, Stella Price (Michelle Collins) and her daughter, Eva Price (Catherine Tyldesley). Karl made his first appearance in the episode broadcast on 17 June 2011. On 30 April 2013, it was announced that Michie would be leaving Coronation Street. Karl departed during the episode broadcast on 13 September 2013.

Karl is described as a "ne'er-do-well". He could have had a career as a professional footballer, but Michie opined that Karl is too keen on "the wine, women and song". He "clings" onto Stella because she is "very reliable and very organised". Karl previously worked part-time in Stella's public house in Rochdale and played for the pub's football team; he later began a relationship with Stella in May 2006. Karl does not have a good relationship with Eva as they are alike and Michie said that she "kind of ruins everything for Karl". The actor told Digital Spy that "Eva is selfish, spoiled and she wants her own way" and Karl is the same. He has also been described as "tense but charming" and a "northern lad". In November 2011, it was revealed that Karl would become a gambling addict and subsequently begin an affair with Sunita Alahan (Shobna Gulati) as he "sets off on a dark journey". In 2013, Karl set the Rovers Return Inn on fire, which led to the deaths of Sunita and local firefighter Toni Griffiths (Tara Moran). He then married Stella and took her hostage in the pub before he was arrested for arson and murder.

== Creation ==
=== Casting ===
The character of Karl and Michie's casting in the role were announced on 15 April 2011, along with Karl's girlfriend, Stella Price (Michelle Collins). Michie said of his casting: "My mum is from Rochdale, my wife is from Grimethorpe - they are both northerners and huge fans. I am from even further north so [Coronation Street] is the only soap for me." Coronation Street executive producer Kieran Roberts said, "I'm thrilled to be welcoming John and Michelle to the cast of Coronation Street. As Robbie Ross in Taggart, John has kept viewers on the edge of their seats for the last ten years. Karl is a very different character for him, though, and the ladies of Weatherfield need to watch themselves as this sexy charmer will quickly make his presence felt. Michelle's acting credentials are first class with more than a decade leading some brilliant and memorable drama series. Of course Michelle's soap credentials are superb and in the same way she made Cindy Beale one of EastEnders' most memorable bitches, I am certain she is going to be fantastic as the warm, funny, steely, flawed and larger-than-life northern matriarch Stella." It was announced on 4 May 2011 that Catherine Tyldesley had been cast as Stella's daughter, Eva, completing the new family. Michie signed an initial one-year contract and began filming his scenes in May. Upon joining the cast, Michie was told that producers would initially "bed [him] in", before increasing his involvement in the show in 2012. Michie made his first on-screen appearance as Karl in the episode broadcast on 17 June 2011.

=== Characterisation ===
"He is also very smart, though, and is an ex-footballer who could have done well but didn't and got involved in the clubbing scene in Manchester. He feels frustrated because he feels he has failed in what he could have done very well at."

— Michie on Karl (2011)

Karl is described as a "ne'er-do-well". Michie told Digital Spy that Karl could have had a career as a professional footballer, but opined that he is too keen on "the wine, women and song". Karl "clings" onto Stella because she is "very reliable and very organised". Stella had a cancer scare and Michie explained that this made Karl "think like a man for the first time in his life". He said "It's made him be responsible and it's made him fall in love with a woman for the first time, rather than just having brief affairs." Karl is attracted to Stella "quite a lot" and Michie opined that Karl does love her. Karl previously worked part-time in Stella's public house in Rochdale and played for the pub's football team. Karl does not have a good relationship with Eva and Michie said that she "kind of ruins everything for Karl". The actor opined that Karl and Eva dislike one another because Karl can see his traits in her. Michie told Digital Spy that "Eva is selfish, spoiled and she wants her own way" and Karl is the same. The Daily Record called Karl "tense but charming". Michie told the newspaper that it is "really nice to get into a new character" and Karl is a "really fascinating guy". Karl has a "real suppression of aggression deep down inside" after failing to become a footballer. Michie is from Scotland, but because Coronation Street is set in Manchester, he uses a Mancunian accent for the role. To prepare for the role, Michie visited bars in Manchester to pick up the dialect.

== Development ==
=== Gambling addiction and affair with Sunita Alahan ===
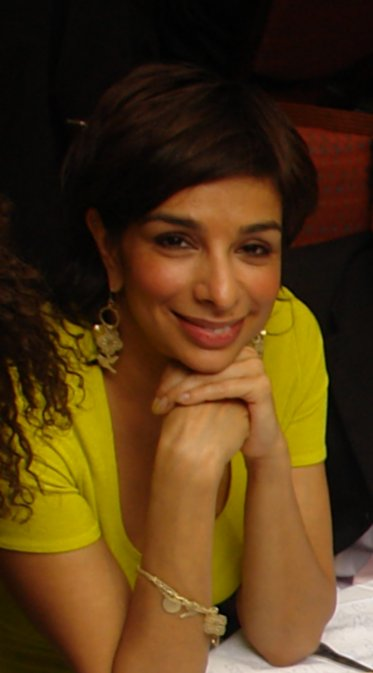
Shobna Gulati (pictured) explained that her character Sunita Alahan finds Karl attractive because of his "naughty" side, and his own attentions to her.

In November 2011, Michie revealed that Karl would become a gambling addict in an upcoming storyline. The actor told the Daily Record that Karl would be gambling for "a while" and descend into debt after "a few big losses". He told the newspaper "You know what gamblers are like, he has to lie, drinks a little bit more than he should and it is going to cause tension in his relationships." Michie also said that Karl's storyline would help viewers "get inside his mind a bit". Munro researched gambling addictions with help from Coronation Street and support from Gamblers Anonymous. Collins responded positively to the storyline as she felt gambling addiction is a "big problem". She opined that people would relate to Karl's addiction and how Stella copes with it. Coronation Street producer, Phil Collinson, revealed that Karl and Stella's relationship would face problems because of this. Collinson teased that Karl may turn to someone else as he "sets off on a dark journey". Remarking on tensions that arise between Karl and Stella, Michie states that "she doesn't know that Karl has a problem, so she can't understand why Karl is behaving the way he is."

In January 2012, it was revealed that Karl would begin an affair with Sunita Alahan (Shobna Gulati). Michie had previously revealed his hopes that Karl would feature in an infidelity storyline, saying "I think [his dream storyline] would involve having an affair with someone behind Stella's back, so there would be a lot of dramatic tension, which is what you want in a drama." Discussing Karl's attraction to Sunita, Michie calls his character a "serial flirt" but notes that with Sunita "there's also a shyness about her that he's quite attracted to." Karl is partly attracted to Sunita because of the differences in their characters and finds her "sexy in a demure way." Golati conjectures that Sunita is attracted to Karl because "he's naughty" and "he's cute, and above all, he's noticed her". She feels the attraction between the pair is able to develop because Sunita's husband Dev "has taken his eye off the ball". Michie remarked that Karl's developing friendship with Sunita brought out his "kind" and "caring" side. He is shocked at the fact Sunita's husband refuses to collect her from the police station after Sunita makes an exhibition of herself whilst drunk. At this point, he states that Karl "is just genuinely helping out - he's not chasing her."

== Storylines ==
Karl arrives in Weatherfield in a removal van the day after his girlfriend, Stella Price (Michelle Collins), gets a job as bar manager at The Rovers Return Inn public house. Karl moves into the pub with Stella and her daughter, Eva (Catherine Tyldesley). Karl gets a job as a driver for local taxi firm "Streetcars". In September, Karl is devastated when Stella is run over by Frank Foster's (Andrew Lancel) car. Stella is placed on life support and Karl is told that she will need emergency surgery due to internal bleeding. Frank apologises and Karl accuses him of blaming Stella for causing the accident. Karl tries to attack Frank, but is restrained by Peter Barlow (Chris Gascoyne). Stella later regains consciousness and recovers. Karl becomes convinced that Stella is having an affair with his employer, Lloyd Mullaney (Craig Charles) and confronts them in the pub. Lloyd confesses to drunkenly kissing Stella, but explains that it was not reciprocated. Karl angrily bars Lloyd from the pub and tells him to stay away from him and Stella. Steve McDonald (Simon Gregson) announces that he is selling the pub and offers Karl and Stella first refusal to buy it. Stella inherits some money from her aunt and puts it towards a deposit. Karl steals the money and gambles it at a casino. He wins a large amount of money and tells Stella that it is for the deposit. Karl and Stella later purchase the pub on the day of Steve's wedding to Tracy Barlow (Kate Ford).

Karl begins visiting the casino more frequently and barmaid Sunita Alahan (Shobna Gulati) realises that Karl has developed a gambling addiction. When Karl picks Sunita up from the police station after she has been arrested for being drunk and disorderly, she and Karl kiss. Karl later stages a break in at the pub in order to pay off his debts and when Stella finds out, she throws Karl out and Sunita lets him stay with her whilst her partner Dev (Jimmi Harkishin) is away. They embark on an affair. Sunita holds some of Karl's money for him after he wins big at the casino, wanting to try to help him beat his addiction. Stella forgives Karl and he returns to the pub. However, Sunita's children Aadi (Zennon Ditchett) and Asha (Tanisha Gorey) discover the money and after refusing to tell Dev where she got the money from; the couple separate and Sunita moves into the pub with Karl, Stella, Eva and Stella's oldest daughter, Leanne Barlow (Jane Danson). Karl becomes increasingly anxious that Sunita will expose their affair after Eva becomes suspicious and later tells Sunita that he loves Stella and ends their relationship. Sunita agrees to marry Dev in order to spite Karl. However, in July 2012 the couple briefly reconcile after Sunita becomes increasingly unhappy with her impending wedding. Karl and Sunita are caught in the act in the pub when Stella, Leanne and Eva arrive back from a night out, in a honey-trap orchestrated by Sunita, after she deletes a text message from Stella on Karl's phone telling him they were returning. A heartbroken Stella throws Karl out and he ends up staying at Sunita's. Dev is willing to give Sunita another chance but she chooses Karl over him. Sunita formally introduces Karl to her children and he promises them he won't get in the way of them seeing their father. Later on Dev confronts Sunita and Karl when he gets jealous of seeing them together with the twins and attacks Karl in front of the twins, aggressively pushing him onto the sofa. Stella then demands that Karl sign his share of the pub over to her. He is reluctant at first but when Stella threatens to tell the police about the staged break-in, he gives in and does what she asks.

Lloyd fires Karl from his job at StreetCars after he discovers Dev contemplating suicide. After unsuccessfully asking for his job back, Karl warns Lloyd that one day he will pay him back dearly. In September 2012, Stella's mother Gloria (Sue Johnston) arrives in Weatherfield. When she finds out about the affair she confronts Karl at Sunita's house and slaps him. Karl blames Sunita for the affair and tells Gloria that he is only with her because Stella won't have him back. Gloria forgives him and tries to reconcile Karl and Stella but is unsuccessful. Karl later expresses disbelief when Stella begins a relationship with Jason Grimshaw (Ryan Thomas), who is twenty years her junior. Stella convinces Sunita that Karl is only using her because he has nowhere else to go. She also inadvertently reveals to Karl that Sunita deleted her text message to him, the night she discovered the affair in order to trap him. Karl goes on a drunken binge and makes a fool of himself at Aadi and Asha's seventh birthday party. Sunita throws him out and he is forced to move into a bedsit. Stella thaws towards Karl and convinces Steve and Lloyd to give him his job back at StreetCars. On 1 March, Karl stays behind to help Stella close up the pub. He makes a drunken pass at her and when she rejects him, Karl becomes aggressive and grabs her arm. Stella slaps him and threatens to scream for help and, shaken, she orders him to leave. The next day he tries to apologize and sends Stella flowers but she continues to shun him.

After Stella visits the brewery, Karl picks her up in his taxi, locks her in and drives her to a deserted location so he can talk to her. Karl becomes upset and Stella comforts him and convinces him to leave her alone. He agrees to do so, but the following day, when Jason finds out about the abduction attempt he punches Karl in the pub. Lloyd and Steve fire him from his job and when Sunita gloats at his predicament, he angrily threatens her in the shop, vowing revenge. Karl becomes increasingly jealous of Stella's relationship with Jason and starts stalking him. He steals Jason's van and torches it. Jason reports him to the police but there is no proof of Karl's involvement. Stella refuses to believe Jason's accusations against Karl and he angrily kicks the wing mirror off Karl's car in frustration. Stella asks Owen Armstrong (Ian Puleston-Davies) to give Karl a job as a labourer at his building yard. When a water pipe bursts at the pub, Karl volunteers to help Jason with the repairs and in the cellar, he sprays water on the fuse box, causing a short circuit in order to frame Jason. He is unsuccessful as Jason and Tim Metcalfe (Joe Duttine) fix the electrics. Karl steals the pubs spare set of keys from behind the bar.

In March 2013, Karl participates in a charity strip-tease at the Bistro. After performing his act, he sneaks away from the event and Sunita sees him running down the ginnel. Karl lets himself into the pub and starts a fire in the cellar. Sunita, who has followed him, catches him in the act and he tells her that he intends to frame Jason and make it look like an accident. A struggle breaks out and Sunita falls down the steps and is knocked unconscious. Karl leaves her and flees, accidentally locking the door behind him. He returns to the Bistro and tries to carry on as if everything is normal, performing in the Full Monty strip tease with the other participants. Norris Cole (Malcolm Hebden) alerts the Bistro customers to the fire and Karl discovers that Stella had gone home early and is trapped in the pub. Karl goes back in to save her and they are trapped in Stella's bedroom. Firefighters Paul Kershaw (Tony Hirst) and Toni Griffiths (Tara Moran) rescue Karl and Stella but Toni is killed when the roof of the pub caves in. Karl accompanies Stella to hospital and supports her family. Sunita is also hospitalized and Karl suggests to Dev that Jason caused the fire with his building materials. Jason later accuses Karl of starting the fire and tells the police of his suspicions. When questioned, Karl tells them he was at the Bistro all night and that Jason has a grudge against him. When Karl discovers that the police suspect Sunita of starting the fire, he plants The Rovers spare keys in her possessions at the hospital after getting her finger prints on them as she lies comatose. He puts her house keys back at her home so that it appears she only had the one set of keys on her logged by the hospital staff.

Karl continues to support Stella as she recovers and panics when Dev tells them that Sunita is showing signs of recovery. He returns to the hospital just as she is regaining consciousness and pulls out her oxygen feeding tube before quickly leaving. Sunita suffers a cardiac arrest and dies. Karl begins to feel guilty when Stella insists that they support Dev during his grief. He carries the coffin at Sunita's funeral and overwhelmed with guilt, he nearly confesses to Stella but she believes he is feeling guilty over the affair. Karl moves into Kevin Webster's (Michael Le Vell) house along with Stella, Eva and Gloria. Stella begins to grow distant with Jason and her feelings for Karl start flooding back. She ends her relationship with Jason and she and Karl reconcile. Jason is angered and warns her that Karl will let her down again.

Karl supports Stella as she is unable to pay for the repairs to The Rovers when the insurance company does not pay out. Owen tries to remove the pub fittings with a crow bar and Karl tries to stop him, challenging him to hit him in a confrontation. Owen backs down and Gloria later pays for the repairs. Karl proposes to Stella and she accepts. The pub reopens and Karl starts working behind the bar again with Stella. When Dev, convinced of Sunita's innocence, tries to get the police to reopen the investigation into the fire, Karl panics. Dev starts questioning witnesses about the night of the fire and Karl considers killing Dev with one of Aadi's golfing trophies but manages to talk him round and convince him to drop the case.

Karl later discovers that Craig Tinker (Colson Smith) had witnessed him leave the pub on the night of the fire. Craig believes he had started the fire accidentally by discarding a cigarette he had been smoking in the smoker's shelter in the pub's back yard. Karl tells Craig that this is true and that he faces a prison sentence, in order to scare him into keeping quiet. He then befriends Craig in order to try and control him and make sure he stays quiet, buying him a computer game as a gift. Karl is later frustrated when Stella considers calling off their wedding due to Leanne's husband Nick Tilsley (Ben Price) being in a coma due to a road accident. When Jason overhears an argument between Karl and Stella, he starts gloating and suggests that Stella is having second thoughts as she is seeing Karl for what he really is: a loser. Jason continues antagonizing Karl on his stag night and he threatens Jason in the pub toilets and confesses to torching his van. Dev breaks up the fight and Jason tells Dev he believes that Karl started The Rovers fire. Dev is initially sceptical but when he overhears Karl threaten to kill Jason, he starts to believe him. Craig later goes missing and when Karl tracks him down, he claims that his guilt is starting to overwhelm him. Karl convinces Craig to come home and gets Craig to tell his mother Beth (Lisa George) that he is being bullied. After more accusations from Dev and Jason, Karl grows exhausted from their constant meddling.

The night before the wedding, Karl walks Stella, Gloria and Eva to Leanne’s flat and sees Craig’s bullies threatening him. Overcome with stress, he intervenes and violently threatens them whilst acting hysterical. Dev has to physically restrain him. After calming down, Karl is horrified that his actions have made Stella suspicious but manages to talk her round. Desperate to escape the country, he makes plans for them to leave for Barcelona after the wedding. Karl later sees Dev attempting to speak to Craig and worries about what Craig told him.

On the day of the wedding, Karl confronts Craig about what he said to Dev. He is relieved when Craig says he hasn't told Dev anything but to make sure he stays quiet, Karl threatens to kill Beth. This proves to be his fatal mistake. A petrified Craig ends up confessing to Dev what he knows and Jason and Beth take him to the police station to make a statement. Meanwhile, a smug Karl marries Stella. Believing all of his problems to be over, he is shocked when Dev bursts through the doors. Dev realises that the marriage has already happened and feigns congratulations. He offers Karl and Stella a lift back to the Street in his car and a concerned and frustrated Karl is forced to accept after being pressured by Stella. The wedding reception is held in the Bistro and Karl sneaks back to the pub to prepare for them to leave. Dev follows him into the pub and confronts him, revealing that he knows Karl started the fire and that Craig is at the police station, telling them what he knows. Stunned, Karl admits to it but claims that he didn't mean for anyone to get hurt. Wanting revenge, Dev tells him that he wants Stella to find out so that he knows what loss feels like. Karl, trying to buy time, offers to turn himself in but Dev leaves to return to the Bistro to tell Stella. Karl starts goading him, telling him that he is better off without Sunita and that he did Dev a favour by killing her. Furious, Dev attacks Karl and a fight breaks out. Karl knocks Dev unconscious with a bottle and starts hurriedly packing his bags. Stella then returns from the Bistro, wondering where Karl has gone.

Panicking, Karl desperately tries to stop her seeing Dev but fails. Stella is shocked and when Karl refuses to let her call an ambulance, she demands an explanation and he is forced to confess to his crimes. Stella is horrified and screams for help and Karl becomes aggressive and threatens her. Dev, who has regained consciousness and is playing dead, sends a text message to Jason who has returned from the police station. Jason breaks into the pub and Karl pours whisky over the bar and threatens to start another fire and confesses to pulling out Sunita's oxygen tube at the hospital. Stella tells Jason to help Dev and Karl drags her into the cellar. She convinces him to give himself up and to leave the pub as the man she fell in love with. Karl then leaves the pub and is arrested by the police, who are waiting outside. As he is handcuffed on the ground he shares a last look with Dev who is being treated by paramedics and is tearful. Karl taunts Jason as he is led away and is last seen being put into the back of a police car as Stella, Gloria, Eva and Leanne watch.

Both Stella and Dev go to see Karl in court, and when they return they announce that he's serving 25 years in prison off-screen.

== Reception ==
In June 2011, Karl came second in an Inside Soap poll to find out which member of the new family readers were most looking forward to seeing on-screen. He received 17% of the vote. The character of Karl arrived on-screen on 17 June 2011, drawing 7.94 million viewers and 37.6% of the total TV viewing audience. In November 2011 Steve Hendry of the Daily Record noted that Michie "hit it lucky in review terms – in comparison to screen girlfriend, Stella" as he escaped the "fierce criticism" she received regarding her Mancunian accent.
