= Stella Price =

Fictional character from Coronation Street

- Coronation Street character
- Portrayed by: Michelle Collins
- Duration: 2011–2014
- First appearance: Episode 7625; 16 June 2011
- Last appearance: Episode 8356; 2 April 2014
- Introduced by: Phil Collinson
In-universe information
- Occupation: Barmaid; Pub landlady Businesswoman; Waitress
- Mother: Gloria Price
- Husband: Karl Munro (2013)
- Daughters: Leanne Battersby; Eva Price
- Grandsons: Oliver Battersby; Simon Barlow (adoptive)
- Granddaughters: Susie Price

Stella Price (also Munro) is a fictional character from the British ITV soap opera Coronation Street, played by Michelle Collins. Collins' casting was announced in April 2011 and she began filming her scenes in May. The actress commuted from north London to Manchester for filming. Collins joined the show in order to have the financial security to ensure that her daughter could go to university. Collins, who is from Southern England and was previously well known for her role as Londoner Cindy Beale on rival soap opera BBC's EastEnders, used a Northern accent for the role of Stella as Coronation Street is set in Manchester. She made her first on-screen appearance during the episode broadcast on 16 June 2011. Stella was introduced along with her boyfriend, Karl Munro (John Michie), and her daughter, Eva (Catherine Tyldesley). The following year, Stella’s mother, Gloria (Sue Johnston), was also introduced. In August 2013, it was announced that Collins would be leaving the soap and she filmed her final scenes on 19 February 2014. Stella departed on 2 April 2014.

Stella became the new bar manager of the show's public house, The Rovers Return Inn, following the departure of landlady Liz McDonald (Beverley Callard). Stella is described as a "confident sort of woman" who is strong, feisty and funny. Collins stated that Stella is not as glamorous as Liz. Stella does not have much money and is quite "down-to-earth". Collins said that Stella is not a "big, bouncy barmaid" as she is more subtle. The actress opined that Stella is a "typical Coronation Street character". Stella arrives with a "dark secret" which is the reason why she has moved to Weatherfield. In June 2011, it was revealed that Stella is the biological mother of Leanne Battersby (Jane Danson) and revealed that she had a relationship with Les Battersby (Bruce Jones). Collins explained that Stella has decided that it is time to make herself known to Leanne. In September 2012, Stella's estranged mother Gloria Price (Sue Johnston) arrived and moved into The Rovers. In October 2012, it was announced that Stella would have a relationship with Jason Grimshaw (Ryan Thomas) who is 19 years younger than she is. In 2013, The Rovers Return was set on fire by Stella's former husband, Karl Munro (John Michie), leaving Stella hospitalised and killing Sunita Alahan (Shobna Gulati) and local firefighter Toni Griffiths (Tara Moran).

== Casting ==
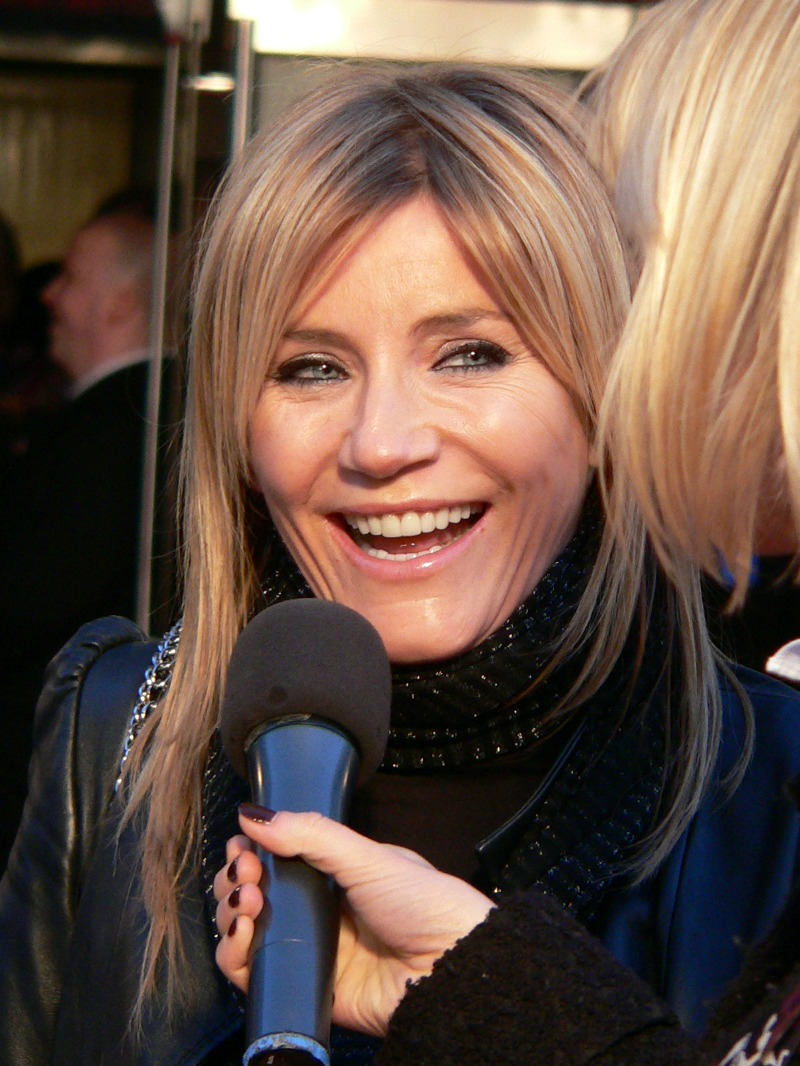
Michelle Collins (pictured) felt "honoured" to be joining the series.

The character of Stella and Collins casting in the role were announced on 15 April 2011, along with that of Stella's boyfriend, Karl Munro (John Michie). Collins said of her casting: "I am honoured to be joining the cast of Coronation Street. The show has been part of my life since I was a child so to become a part of it is extremely exciting." Coronation Street executive producer Kieran Roberts said, "I'm thrilled to be welcoming John and Michelle to the cast of Coronation Street. As Robbie Ross in Taggart, John has kept viewers on the edge of their seats for the last ten years. Karl is a very different character for him, though, and the ladies of Weatherfield need to watch themselves as this sexy charmer will quickly make his presence felt. Michelle's acting credentials are first class with more than a decade leading some brilliant and memorable drama series. Of course Michelle's soap credentials are superb and in the same way she made Cindy Beale one of EastEnders' most memorable bitches, I am certain she is going to be fantastic as the warm, funny, steely, flawed and larger-than-life northern matriarch Stella."

It was stated that Stella would be joined by her daughter, Eva, who had yet to be cast. It was announced on 4 May 2011 that Catherine Tyldesley had been cast as Eva. Collins later revealed that she joined the show in order to have the financial security to ensure that her daughter can go to university. She began filming her scenes on 1 May. Other actresses who auditioned for the role of Stella included Lisa Maxwell, Sarah Jane Buckley and Jacqueline Leonard. Lisa Stansfield was also considered, but she turned it down as she was unable to commit to the soap for three years. Collins, who commuted from North London to Manchester where Coronation Street is filmed, made her first screen appearance on 16 June 2011. In May 2012, rumours began that Collins had quit Coronation Street to spend more time with her daughter. However, Collins stated that she was not leaving the soap and just signed a new twelve-month contract. She added "I'm really enjoying playing Stella and have made some firm friends on the cast."

== Development ==
=== Characterisation ===
Stella is described as a "confident sort of woman" who is strong, feisty and funny. Stella was the landlady of The Sundial public house in Rochdale, before becoming the bar manager of the Rovers Return Inn. Collins said that Stella is not as glamorous as previous landlady, Liz McDonald (Beverley Callard). Stella does not have much money and is quite "down-to-earth". ITV said that she is "the perfect front of house landlady". Collins explained to media entertainment website Digital Spy that Stella is not a "big, bouncy barmaid" as she is more subtle. She is a "feminine, strong and forthright woman in her late 40s". Stella does not dress inappropriately, but wants to be "sexy-looking". Collins is from the south of England, but because Coronation Street is set in Manchester, she uses a northern accent for the role. She admitted that she was "working hard" to get the right accent, but said it was tough. In February 2012, Collins said that viewers are more positive towards her accent. She said it was "funny" that people come up to her and say that her accent has improved when she has not changed anything. Collins also added that she knew it was going to be hard to get used to seeing Cindy Beale in The Rovers but viewers have accepted it a bit more to which she said was great.

=== Leanne Battersby ===
When the character was announced, it was revealed that she was hiding a "dark secret" and news of her past would have "shocking consequences" for some established characters. In May 2011, the Daily Mirror reported that the secret Stella is hiding is that she is Leanne Battersby's (Jane Danson) biological mother. A Coronation Street source told the newspaper: "This was genius by the bosses. And it makes for a massive future for Michelle in the show. There has been a lot of cloak and dagger involved in the arrival of Stella." However, the storyline was not confirmed by the show. In an interview with Soaplife magazine, Collins revealed that Stella "does have one big skeleton in her closet". She said "Let's just say there's a reason she's come to Coronation Street. It's a fantastic storyline and I'm very, very excited about it." The storyline was confirmed in June 2011. Collins told Soaplife magazine that Stella has moved to Weatherfield as she has decided that it is the time to finally make herself known to Leanne. Stella was in a relationship with Les Battersby (Bruce Jones) and gave birth to Leanne when she was seventeen. Les started drinking and left her alone with Leanne and she struggled to cope. Stella left with every intention of coming back for Leanne once she was settled. When she did, Les would not let her near Leanne and Collins said that Stella "didn't stand a chance".

Leanne discovers Stella's true identity as she celebrates her 30th birthday. Speaking to Inside Soap magazine about the storyline, Danson explained: "Leanne has never really given her birth mother a second thought because she's not been in her life. Her dad Les and stepmum Janice [Battersby] (Vicky Entwistle) were together for a long time, so Janice always took on that mother role. Having said that, Leanne's always known Janice by her first name, so she hasn't called anyone 'Mummy'." Discussing having Collins as her on-screen mother, Danson said that she was looking forward to the "really meaty" scenes between Stella and Leanne. Danson added that people have said that she and Collins have similar face shapes and the same mannerisms. She thought it would be interesting to see if viewers pick up on the resemblance between herself and Collins.

=== Departure ===
Collins announced her departure on 22 August 2013 and she filmed her final scenes on 19 February 2014. Series producer Stuart Blackburn confirmed that Stella's exit would be low-key, following a series of big exits ones and future ones. He explained "It's an exit where she's trying to do the right thing by Leanne. There's a space and time where her exit might help Leanne. There's also a sense of Stella looking at Gloria and her lust for life. She's also looking at Eva who's with Jason. She thinks, 'I'm not dead yet - I'm only 50 and there's a whole world out there!'" Blackburn hoped Stella's departure would be moving and said the door had been left open for Collins to return in the future. After deciding to move to New York City, Stella departed on 2 April 2014.

== Storylines ==
Stella arrives in Weatherfield and applies for the position of bar manager at The Rovers Return Inn public house. She initially refuses the position when the landlord Steve McDonald (Simon Gregson) explains that accommodation is not included. However, Stella accepts the position after Steve decides to let her move in. Stella moves in with her boyfriend, Karl Munro (John Michie) and her daughter, Eva (Catherine Tyldesley). Stella becomes the licensee of the pub. She goes to the bookmakers and whilst there a robber threatens worker, Leanne Barlow (Jane Danson), with a baseball bat. Stella wrestles him to the ground and takes the bat, causing him to run off. Leanne and her husband, Peter (Chris Gascoyne), invite Stella for a meal at their home as thanks. At the meal, Leanne discusses her family and shows Stella photos of them. Stella then steals a photo of Leanne. Stella gives Peter some flowers for Leanne as thanks for the meal and forgets that her purse is underneath them. She offers to hold Leanne's 30th birthday party at the pub, which Peter agrees to. Peter returns Stella's purse to her and asks her why she has Leanne's photo in it. Stella tells him that she is Leanne's mother. Stella begs Peter not to tell Leanne and he agrees. At Leanne's 30th birthday party, Stella becomes emotional and Peter attempts to calm her down. Stella and Peter argue and when Leanne overhears them, she demands to know why they are arguing. Stella reveals to Leanne that she is her mother, having had a relationship with Leanne's father, Les Battersby (Bruce Jones), when she was seventeen. Overwhelmed by Leanne's negative reaction, she flies off the handle and slaps Eva.

Afterwards relations begin to improve between Stella and Leanne as they reach a mutual understanding. However, Leanne gets wound up by half-sister Eva and angrily tells Stella that she cannot forgive her for abandoning her as a child. Later Stella calls to the flat to talk with Leanne but is run over by a drunk Carla Connor (Alison King) while she's standing on the street. She is rushed to hospital, where she is placed on life support. A few days later she regains consciousness, much to the relief of Karl, Eva and Leanne. After Frank Foster (Andrew Lancel) switched places with an unconscious Carla, he is cautioned for supposedly dangerous driving. However, a few weeks later after Carla calls off her wedding to Frank he rapes her and is imprisoned, causing him to tell Leanne that it was actually Carla who ran over Stella after a drunken row with Frank's parents. Shocked that Peter knew about this, it causes friction between Leanne and Peter. Then in an ironic twist, Stella goes to see Carla, who is struggling to deal with her rape, and confesses that twenty years previously she was raped whilst working in a pub in Rochdale. Stella befriends Karl's colleague Lloyd Mullaney (Craig Charles), who is lonely after breaking up with his girlfriend Cheryl Gray (Holly Quin-Ankrah). Stella and Lloyd become very good friends, and eventually a drunken Lloyd tries to kiss Stella, who rejects him as she is in a relationship with Karl and she loves him. Lloyd leaves feeling ashamed after making a fool of himself. The next day, Lloyd apologises and tells Stella that he understands her anger, but Stella accepts his apology and agrees to forget all about the incident. Unknownst to Stella and Lloyd, the radio is still switched on, in the cab office, and Karl overhears their conversation. After an angry confrontation between the three, Lloyd explains that he is not having an affair with Stella and that it was simply a misunderstanding on his part.

After being approved for a mortgage, Stella and Karl buy The Rovers from Steve in January 2012, making Stella the new landlady. She supports Leanne when she discovers that Peter has been having an affair with Carla, who Stella previously supported throughout her rape ordeal, and Leanne leaves Weatherfield briefly because she can no longer trust Peter. Stella confronts Peter and Carla in and condemns them for breaking Leanne's heart. Stella is furious when it also emerges that Carla was driving the car instead of Frank when she was knocked down, and threatens Carla to tell the police to get her imprisoned. She eventually agrees, however, that Carla didn't know what she was doing and leaves that bit out of it. She vows that if Leanne doesn't return, then she'll kill Carla. Leanne returns a couple of months later, and begins a custody fight for the full-care of her and Peter's son, Simon. When money goes missing from the till, Stella accuses several people, including Tina McIntyre (Michelle Keegan), Sean Tully (Antony Cotton), Sunita Alahan (Shobna Gulati) and Tommy Duckworth (Chris Fountain). However, Stella is horrified when Karl reveals that he took the money to gamble with it. Stella bans Karl from using the till, or dealing with any money in the premises. Unbeknown to Stella, Karl begins an affair with her friend Sunita, who helps Karl with his gambling addiction - however when Karl wins a large sum of money in the casino, Sunita takes care of it for him. When Sunita's twins Aadi (Zennon Ditchett) and Asha (Tanisha Gorey) discover the money, it sparks Sunita and her husband Dev (Jimmi Harkishin) to separate and Sunita stays with Stella, where Eva becomes suspicious of Karl and Sunita's relationship. Stella later attempts to act impartial when Leanne reunites with ex-husband Nick Tilsley (Ben Price), who had recently ended his relationship with Eva; the argument causes Leanne and step-son Simon (Alex Bain) to move out of the pub. Stella invites Leanne and Eva on a girls night out in order to repair their broken relationship and upon their return they discover Karl and Sunita together. Stella then throws Karl out and reveals that Sunita has been cheating to Dev and Karl has been cheating on her. She also slaps Sunita in the process. She throws Karl out of his home and he sleeps in his taxi after declining a bed offer by both Steve and Michelle Connor (Kym Marsh). Despite repeated begging from Karl, Stella ends their relationship and it emerges that it is not the first time Karl has slept with another woman.

In September 2012, Stella's mother Gloria (Sue Johnston) arrived on the street and the moment she turned up, she was already upsetting Ken Barlow (William Roache) by the noise she was making when knocking on The Rovers' doors. When Stella answered the door she was shell-shocked. Gloria tells Stella that she is on the run from her lover, so Stella offers her mother a place to stay. The next day, Gloria visits Karl, slapping him, and tells him to go around to the pub for a family meeting. Stella, Eva and Leanne are furious and Stella throws her mother out, prompting her to ask Leanne for a place at her flat and she agrees, however Gail McIntyre (Helen Worth) thinks it is unfair on her son Nick and girlfriend Leanne to have Gloria living with her, so Gail assists Gloria to ask Stella to move back in with her and she eventually agrees. Later on, Gloria enters the pub into Pub of the Year contest and to Stella's annoyance Gloria puts her own name down as landlady, Stella is later more annoyed when Gloria bars Norris Cole (Malcolm Hebden) from the pub, Stella then tells Norris he is welcome back to the pub and Gloria apologises. Stella then begins a relationship with Jason Grimshaw (Ryan Thomas) and Karl then begins a vendetta against him. Karl starts by abducting Jason's work van and setting fire to it. On that same night, Karl makes a pass at Stella and attempts to rape her but she slaps him and orders him to leave. When Stella needs a taxi to go into town, she is horrified when Karl reveals himself as the driver and whisks her off by a lake. She manages to talk Karl into driving her back to Weatherfield, where she is very late for her date with Jason. When Stella tells Gloria about this, she reveals all to Jason so he starts a fight with Karl in The Rovers.

In March 2013, Dev decides to give Sunita a second chance, but Stella advises against it so Dev dumps Sunita again. Later, Sunita throws a drink over Stella while in the Bistro, so she decides to go home and have a bath. While Stella is enjoying a nice, warm bath, Karl sneaks into the pub cellar and sets fire to The Rovers. He is stunned when he finds Sunita watching him, so he pushes her down the stairs of the cellar, leaving her unconscious. Stella and Sunita then have to fight for their lives as the pub explodes with flames. Sunita manages to make it into the back room, but collapses and slips into unconsciousness a second time. Karl dashes into the pub to save Stella, but they both become trapped. Paul Kershaw (Tony Hirst) and Toni Griffiths (Tara Moran) manage to rescue Karl and Stella, but Toni is the unfortunate one as the roof collapses on her. She subsequently dies from her injuries. Stella, Sunita and Karl are all rushed to hospital, with Stella and Sunita both in a critical condition, but Stella later makes a full recovery. Sunita, however, remains unconscious. When Sally Webster (Sally Dynevor) reveals that her ex-husband Kevin (Michael Le Vell) has emigrated to Germany to look after his ill father Bill (Peter Armitage), she lets Stella and her family move into his house. Karl also moves in when he is hailed as "the hero".

Stella is upset when she learns Sunita apparently started the fire. She kisses Karl and Jason breaks up with her. Stella is upset to hear that Sunita has died in hospital and helps Dev by looking after his children Asha and Aadi. Stella then gets engaged to Karl after months of paying off debt, which Gloria helped with. While at work, Stella scolds Anna Windass (Debbie Rush) for slapping fellow barmaid Tina. In September 2013, Stella marries Karl at a registry office just seconds before Dev arrives knowing that Karl is responsible for the fire and Sunita's death. Instead of revealing the truth about Karl, Dev congratulates them and then drives them to the Bistro for their reception. But after Karl leaves to go to the pub, Dev follows him. Later, Stella notices that Karl has been gone for a while so she goes to The Rovers and finds him watching over an unconscious Dev - following a fight - and then discovers that Karl was responsible for the fire and Sunita's death. Jason arrives and tries to rescue Stella but Karl then threatens to set fire to the pub again and takes Stella hostage into the cellar. Stella then tells Karl to give himself up for her. He does and is arrested by the police.

Stella admits she can't stay around in the pub because of bad memories, so tells Eva and Gloria that she's selling up. Steve tells her that he wants to buy the pub, much to Stella's delight. When Eva has sex with Stella's former boyfriend, Jason, Gloria confronts the pair but Stella insists that she is fine with the relationship so they resume it. Steve orders Stella to not tell his girlfriend Michelle that he is buying the pub as he wants it to be a surprise for her However, Michelle is furious when Steve reveals to the street that they are the new owners of the pub. Stella and Gloria then move back into Kevin's house and Eva moves in with Jason. Stella and Gloria also work at the Bistro. Stella and Gloria are present when Tina and Kylie Platt (Paula Lane) share a catfight in front of the bar at The Rovers. The pub are then shocked when Steve's mother, Liz (Beverley Callard) returns and breaks up the fight. Stella comforts Eva when Kylie accidentally slaps her during the catfight. Stella, Gloria and Eva all attend baby Lily Platt's christening. During the christening, it is revealed that Kylie and Nick had a one-night stand on Christmas Day 2012. Stella and the Price family all comfort Leanne following the revelation. Stella continues to work at the Bistro, but begins clashing with Nick's mother Gail a lot more. Stella is delighted when Nick and Leanne give their marriage another shot but the family are horrified when Nick slaps Leanne across the face over a cracker joke. The two still remain as a couple but Stella invites Leanne to temporarily move in with her and Gloria, stating that they both need a bit of space. Nick and Leanne eventually decide to break up but the two still remain as friends and continue to work at the Bistro together.

Stella is upset when Gloria says that she is leaving Weatherfield to go travelling. After Gloria's departure Stella discovers that Kevin is returning to the Street and is planning on moving back into number 13 meaning she only has a few days to find somewhere else to live. Stella arranges with Dev for Leanne, Eva and Simon to move into the flat above the kebab shop and reveals that she has been offered a job in a hotel in New York City through an old school friend. Eva feels that her mother is abandoning her but after putting their differences aside Stella departs, bidding an emotional farewell to Leanne, Eva, Simon and Dev.

In February 2016, Eva reveals Stella is now living in the South of France and goes to stay with her after her relationship with Jason breaks down. After being pushed down the stairs by Michelle's stalker in late 2017, Leanne stays with Stella to recover and for her to meet her grandchild. In 2018, Eva departs Weatherfield with Susie to live with Stella for a fresh start and to bond with Susie.

== Reception ==
Coronation Street actress Kym Marsh (who plays Michelle Connor) said it was "great" that Collins was joining the show. Upon Collins debut in Coronation Street, viewers criticised her northern accent. However, Coronation Street producer, Phil Collinson defended Collins commenting "I think the landlady of the Rovers Return would have to be a Northern character, really, I don't think we could have had a Southerner running the pub." He opined that Collins accent was great and that viewers would "just get used to it". After it was reported that the Coronation Street cast were unhappy over Collins casting, her co-star Antony Cotton (who plays Sean Tully) spoke out to deny the claims. He said that the cast and crew had "far better things to do" than gossip about Collins. He added that Collins is "so very watchable" and called Stella and her family "exciting and intriguing". Tyldesley also defended Collins saying "There is absolutely nothing wrong with her accent from my point of view and she's doing an amazing job." Marsh reiterated her opinion, asking viewers to give Collins a chance to settle into the role. In July 2011, it was reported that Collins could be axed from the show if she does not "win over viewers". However, this was denied by a Coronation Street spokeswoman.
