= Tanisha Gorey =

English actress (born 2002)

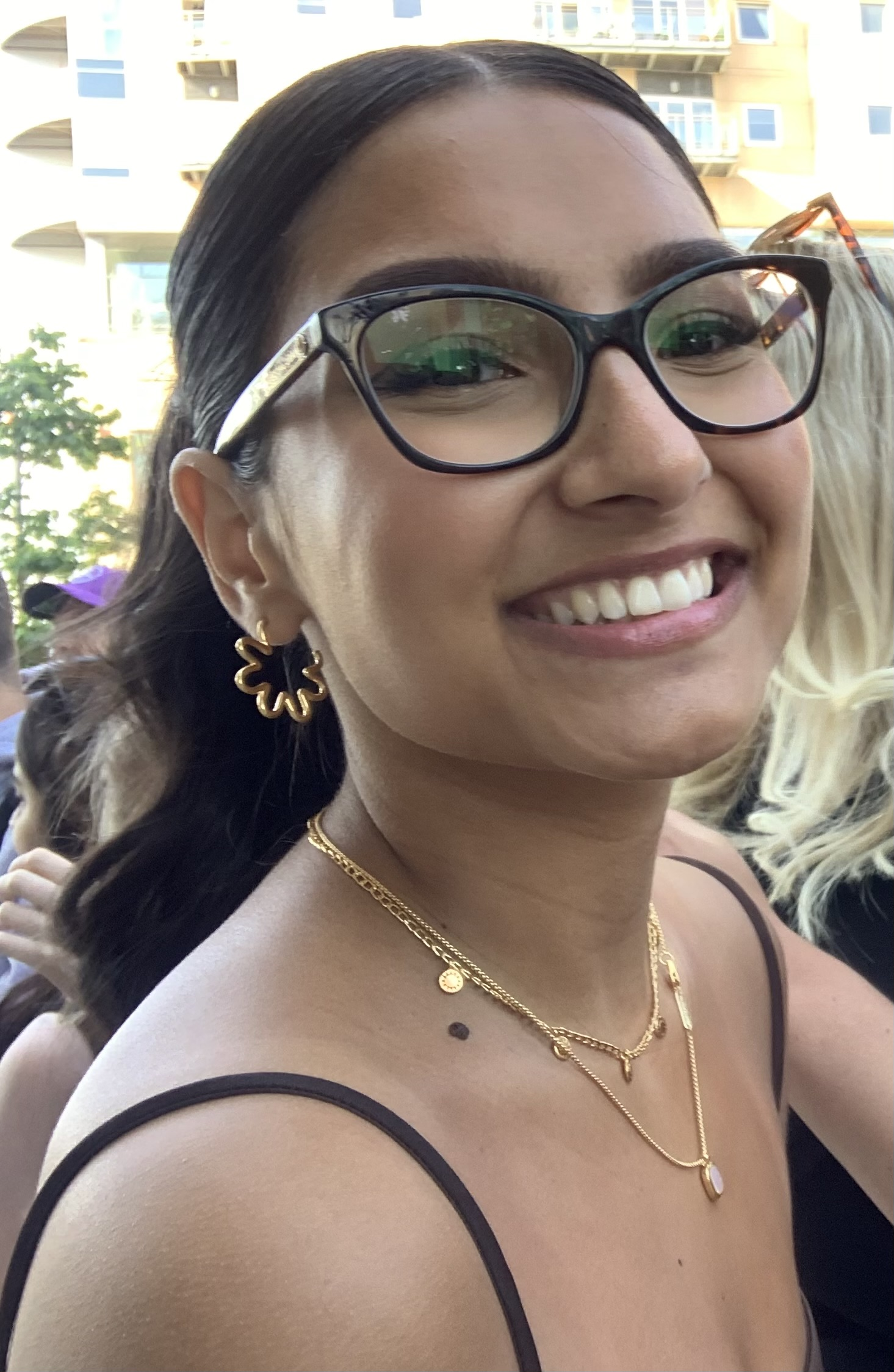
- Gorey in 2023
- Born: Tanisha Nicole C. Gorey; 9 June 2002 (age 23); Oldham, Greater Manchester, England
- Occupation: Actress
- Years active: 2009–present
- Partner(s): Lucas Whelan (2020–present; engaged)

Tanisha Nicole C. Gorey (born 9 June 2002) is an English actress, known for portraying the role of Asha Alahan on the ITV1 soap opera Coronation Street since 2009.

== Life and career ==
Tanisha Nicole C. Gorey was born on 9 June 2002 in Oldham, Greater Manchester. In 2009, she joined the cast of the ITV soap opera Coronation Street as Asha Alahan, the daughter of Dev (Jimmi Harkishin) and Sunita Alahan (Shobna Gulati). Her storylines in the soap have included the death of her mother, as well as her character becoming a paramedic and suffering racist abuse which results in panic attacks. She also appeared in the crossover episode Corriedale in January 2026.

Outside of Coronation Street, Gorey has made appearances on programmes including Saturday Mash-Up!, Lorraine and This Morning. In 2025, she appeared on the ITV series The Great Escapers alongside her Coronation Street co-stars Andy Whyment and Maureen Lipman in which they attempted to organise the best Malta holiday. In 2026, Gorey became engaged to her partner Lucas Whelan, whom she has been in a relationship with since 2020.

== Filmography ==
Year	Title	Role	Notes	Ref.
2009–present	Coronation Street	Asha Alahan	Regular role	
2020	Saturday Mash-Up!	Herself	Guest; 1 episode	
2020, 2025	Lorraine	Herself	Guest; 2 episodes	
2022	DNA Journey	Herself	Guest; 1 episode	
2023	This Morning	Herself	Guest; 1 episode	
2025	Celebrity Big Brother: Late & Live	Herself	Guest; 1 episode	
2025	The Great Escapers	Herself	Guest; 1 episode	
2026	Corriedale	Asha Alahan	Spin-off	
