= Maya Sharma =

Fictional character from Coronation Street

- Coronation Street character
- Portrayed by: Sasha Behar
- Duration: 2003–2004
- First appearance: 19 September 2003
- Last appearance: 24 November 2004
- Introduced by: Kieran Roberts
In-universe information
- Occupation: Lawyer
- Father: Dinesh Sharma
- Mother: Ann Marie Sharma

Maya Sharma is a fictional character from the British ITV soap opera Coronation Street, played by Sasha Behar. The character's storylines included her relationship with Dev Alahan (Jimmi Harkishin) and her feud with Dev's wife Sunita Parekh (Shobna Gulati). Notably, Maya held the pair hostage in her flat and set the building on fire. As she made her escape, Maya was involved in a car crash.

== Storylines ==
Maya, dubbed "Mad Maya", starts out as a lawyer. Originally, she advises Roy (David Neilson) and Hayley Cropper (Julie Hesmondhalgh) about matters regarding legal custody of baby Amy Barlow. She falls for shopkeeper Dev Alahan (Jimmi Harkishin), who seems to take an immediate liking to her. Despite striking up a friendship with Frankie Baldwin (Debra Stephenson), very quickly, it seems there is something wrong as she steals vases and kidnaps Monica, Tyrone Dobbs' (Alan Halsall) dog. She also leaves a restaurant without paying and drives Dev around a country road extremely fast, threatening not to stop the car unless he proposes to her. At her engagement party to Dev, Tyrone tries to ruin the event by telling everyone that she killed his dog and he compares her to Cruella De Vil, but she resists this.

Dev rekindled his love for ex-girlfriend Sunita Parekh (Shobna Gulati) when he discovers she has a brain tumour. Maya is ostensibly sympathetic and decides to use this by playing the caring friend and telling Sunita she might be putting pressure on Dev. When Dev announces his love for Sunita, Maya trashes the shop and the flat. Sunita recovers and Dev dumps Maya and starts dating Sunita again. At Dev and Sunita's engagement party, Maya wrecks Sunita's dress by spilling a glass of wine on it. Then, she marries several illegal immigrants, posing as Sunita. Consequently, Dev and Sunita are arrested on their wedding day as the marriage is not legal. Dev is freed and starts investigating, finding a taxi driver who took Maya to one of the illegal weddings to convince the police that Maya was behind these plans. This clears Sunita's name and she is released and Maya is arrested and charged but released on bail. In revenge, she sets fire to all of Dev's shops before taking Sunita hostage. She phones Dev and asks him to come home, which he does, and finds a message from Maya in lipstick on the table, telling him to go to the shop on Coronation Street. This is the only property that has not been destroyed. When he arrives and sees a bound and gagged Sunita, he tells her that everything will be ok but Maya knocks him out and ties him up too. When he wakes up, they talk about how he dumped her and how upset she was. Later a policeman comes to the door. Dev screams to attract attention but Maya gags him to stop his cries for help and tells the police that she is Sunita. While she does this, Dev gets a knife and cuts his legs free.

When Maya returns, she turns the gas on the stove on and leaves the kitchen, telling Dev that if he believes in reincarnation that maybe next time he would come back as something better and starts a fire in the shop below, leaving them tied up inside a locked room. Soon, Jamie Baldwin (Rupert Hill) and Leanne Battersby (Jane Danson) notice the fire and Rita Sullivan (Barbara Knox) calls the fire brigade. Dev breaks the window with the curtain rail, attracting the attention of people below. Ciaran McCarthy (Keith Duffy) and Charlie Stubbs (Bill Ward) come to the rescue. Dev is released by Ciaran while Charlie rescues Sunita just before the shop explodes. Maya is quite shocked when Dev and Sunita are rescued as she is watching from her car at the other end of the street and then tries running Dev and Sunita over but misses when Charlie and Ciaran pull them out of the way. She crashes into a wall but gets up and starts the car again, reversing it out to try again but a truck crashes into the back and smashes her into another wall. Maya is alive and goes to the same hospital as Sunita but when Sunita finds out, she leaves immediately as she is worried about her safety until Shelley Unwin (Sally Lindsay) tells her that Maya is on life support and her hospital room is under police guard. After coming out of intensive care, Maya is remanded in custody to await trial. Little is now known about Maya. She was last mentioned when Leanne offered Dev a share of her restaurant business in 2007 as Maya had tried to tempt Leanne into suing Dev for unfair dismissal from the Corner Shop at the beginning of her campaign of revenge.

== Reception ==
In 2004, ITV received complaints because of a scene in which viewers saw Maya threaten Sunita with a statue of Hindu god Lord Ganesh. ITV apologised for the scene, but Hindu leaders rejected the apology. Ramesh Kallidai, secretary of the Hindu Forum of Britain, said: "The apology is not unconditional, it makes a justification for the behaviour. This is not acceptable to us." The scene was part of a long-running storyline in the ITV1 soap. It showed Maya, played by Sasha Behar, threatening Sunita (Shobna Gulati), saying her husband would come home to find her "beaten to death by Ganesh", the God of good fortune.

Radio Times included Maya on their feature profiling bunny boilers. Opining on her fixation with Dev they stated: "While we might question the object of Maya's fixation - Dev, for heaven's sake? - there's no denying her single-mindedness." They also commented on her career status adding: "As ever in soap, the middle classes are trouble - Maya was a solicitor."
