= Eva Price =

Fictional character from Coronation Street

- Coronation Street character
- Portrayed by: Catherine Tyldesley
- Duration: 2011–2018, 2025–present
- First appearance: Episode 7627; 17 June 2011
- Introduced by: Phil Collinson (2011); Kate Brooks (2025)
- Spin-off appearances: What Would Kirk Do? (2014–2015); Text Santa (2013)
In-universe information
- Occupation: Barmaid; Waitress; Machinist; Personal assistant Pub landlady
- Mother: Stella Price
- Stepfather: Karl Munro
- Half-sisters: Leanne Battersby
- Daughters: Susie Price
- Grandmothers: Gloria Price
- Nephews: Oliver Battersby; Simon Barlow (adoptive)

Eva Price is a fictional character from the British ITV soap opera Coronation Street, played by Catherine Tyldesley, her character and casting was announced in May 2011 and she made her first appearance on screen on 17 June 2011. Eva was introduced as Stella Price's (Michelle Collins) daughter. On 24 August 2014, Tyldesley announced that she was expecting her first child. Eva left the show on 23 February 2015. Tyldesley returned to filming on 13 July 2015, and Eva's return scenes aired on 16 September 2015. It was announced on 1 December 2017 that Tyldesley had decided to leave the show to pursue other acting roles after seven years. Tyldesley filmed her final scenes on 20 June 2018 which were broadcast on 3 August 2018. In 2025 it was announced that Eva will return later on in the year after 7 years away. Her return scenes aired on 27 October 2025.

Eva moves into The Rovers Return Inn with her mother Stella, and her mother's boyfriend, Karl Munro (John Michie). Tyldesley later said in May 2012 that Eva's glamorous lifestyle can be "straining", and that she enjoys time off work to wear normal and more comfortable clothes. Kate White of Inside Soap praised the character while a writer for the Daily Mirror nicknamed the character "Eva The Diva". Eva was described as being "feisty." Tyldesley revealed more about her character, saying: "Eva is a little bit of a princess! She's been spoiled rotten, so she's somewhat high maintenance and a little bit of a drama queen. She's definitely used to getting her own way." Laura Armstrong from The People described Eva as a "fit barmaid" and later added that "her shifts at Nick's Bistro seem like a stroll in a Manchester park".

== Creation and casting ==
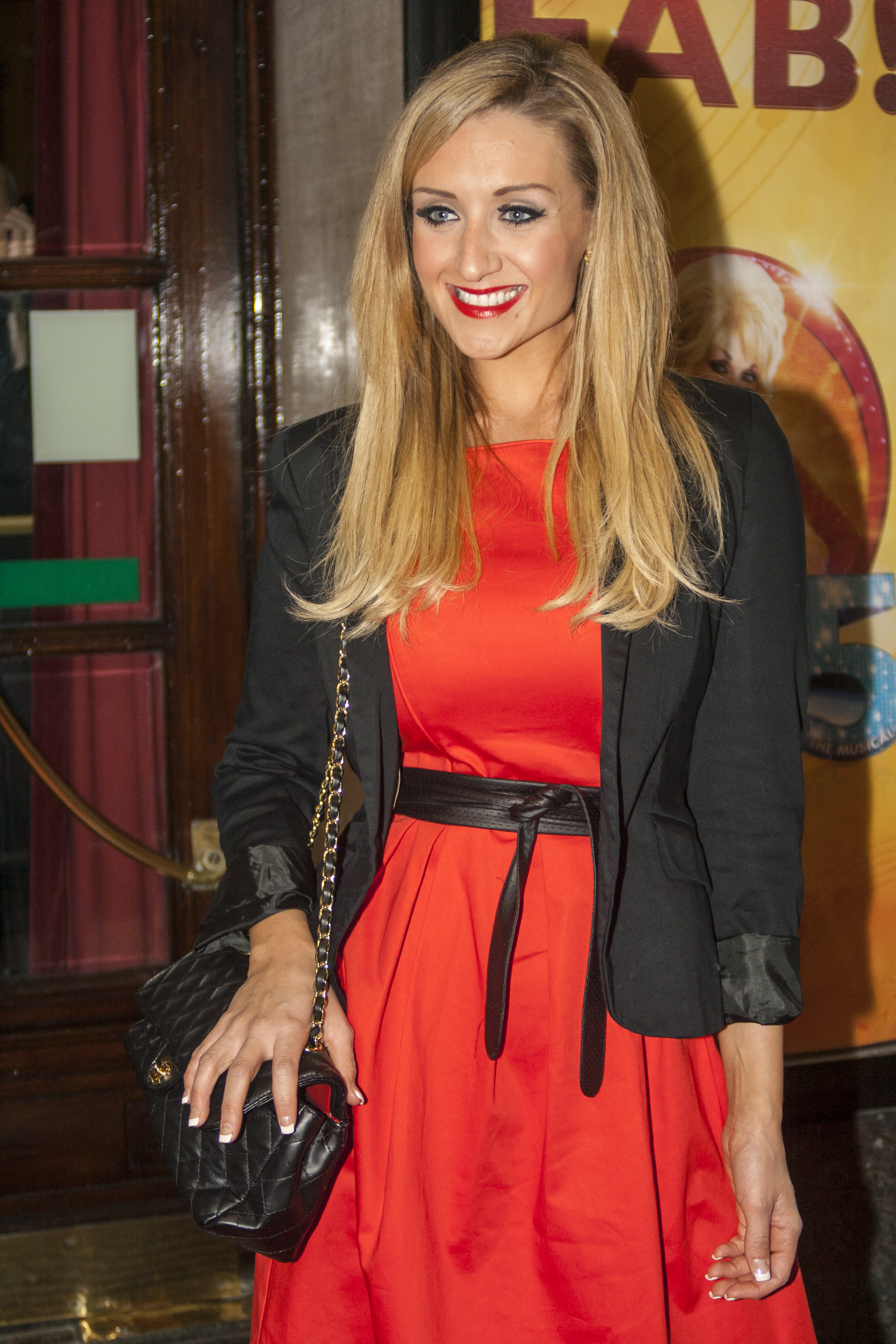
Catherine Tyldesley (pictured) was cast as Eva in May 2011 and made her first on-screen appearance on 17 June 2011.

On 4 May 2011, it was revealed that Tyldesley had been cast in the role of Eva. This was Tyldesley's second role in Coronation Street, having previously played a minor role as Jayne Collinge, a maternity nurse that helped deliver Dev and Sunita Alahan's twins in January 2006. The actress, who has previously appeared in Emmerdale and Lilies, began filming her first scenes that month. During an interview with Digital Spy, Tyldesley revealed that there had been a lot of competition for the role of Eva and that she felt "incredibly lucky" to have secured the part. Tyldesley said she felt "nervous" when she first arrived on set. Speaking to What's on TV, she said that she had a "mini freak out" when filming her first scenes in The Rovers. Tyldesley added that Coronation Street is "absolutely legendary" and is thrilled to be a part of the cast. After impressing producers, it was later confirmed that Tyldesley was to be kept on as a permanent member of the cast. After signing a new six-month contract, an executive said that Eva will be involved in some "cracking" storylines towards the end of the year. In May 2012, Tyldesley expressed her desire for a long-term stint on the show. Speaking to the Daily Mirror, Tyldesley said "I've always wanted to be in Corrie. So when I got the phone call to tell me that I'd got the part, I was thrilled to bits." She also added that Eva has got "so much scope".

== Development ==
=== Characterisation ===
Before she appeared on screen, Eva was described as being "feisty." Tyldesley revealed more about her character, saying "Eva is a little bit of a princess! She's been spoiled rotten, so she's somewhat high maintenance and a little bit of a drama queen. She's definitely used to getting her own way." The actress said her character adores her mother and they share a great relationship. When Eva enters the show, her circumstances force her to be more angry than she normally is. Tyldesley said that Eva does have a softer side, which she believed viewers would see in the future. When asked why Eva and Karl do not get along, Tyldesley said "I think it's because they're both quite similar. When Eva first joins the street, she's had a little bit of turmoil with past relationships and things like that, so I think she feels like she wants to be quite selfish at the moment, which annoys Karl. But she's always been full of self-importance because she's always been spoiled – she's not known any different." Tyldesley revealed that Eva is not a lesbian character, despite a newspaper report, and that she definitely loves the boys. When asked about Eva's type, Tyldesley said that they would have to be "on her wavelength" as Eva gets bored and frustrated with people who are not on her level. In May 2012, Tyldesley commented that Eva's glamorous lifestyle can be "straining" and she enjoys time off work so she can wear normal and more comfortable clothes.

She wears the stuff I would never have the nerve to wear. It's weird, sometimes you just feel really glam and it's a nice feeling. Then other times you feel she's gone slightly overboard, ridiculous big hair and fake eyelashes – like TOWIE on Red Bull!

— Tyldesley explains Eva's sense of dress (2012)

Tyldesley admitted in June 2012 that men do not approach her outside of the show and blamed her character for putting other men off. Speaking to the Daily Mirror, Tyldesley said: "I'm so disillusioned with men at the moment. Possibly men are intimidated by my screen character, I don't know. I've been single for a while. I've been on a couple of dates, but it's been quite a long time now."

In an interview with Digital Spy in June 2017, Tyldesley expressed interest in Eva's father being introduced into the show, she said: "He walked out when she was three. She's spoken about that in previous episodes, saying he just packed his bags and went. That's something I've always thought I'd love Corrie to do, to bring him in. So I hope they do bring in Eva's dad, because he has a lot to answer for. There were few details about why he walked out, as Stella said very little about it." She also expressed interest in Michelle Collins reprising her role as Eva's mother Stella.

=== Friendship with Kylie Platt ===
Paula Lane revealed that Eva will start a friendship with Kylie Platt. Lane said Eva would feature in "lighter" storylines with Kylie and that viewers will see a happy side to Kylie as Eva "becomes her sidekick". She also added that herself and Tyldesley are a "nightmare" on set saying that they "laugh a lot".

=== Relationship with Nick Tilsley ===
It was announced in late 2011 that Eva is to start a relationship with Nick Tilsley. Ben Price hinted that Eva and Nick are made for each other. Speaking to Inside Soap, asked whether who would be good for Nick, Price replied: "Maybe Eva. I think she'd be perfect for him – she's intelligent, feisty and Leanne's half-sister. After Natasha Blakeman, who was barmy and clingy, and then Leanne, which was complicated, Nick needs someone to give him a run for his money. That's what Becky can do and perhaps someone like Michelle – but not Fiz or Julie! It has to be someone who's going to have an intelligent argument with him, make him laugh and not take his nonsense." Speaking to Soaplife, Tyldesley explains Eva's motions when Stella starts to show a significant amount of interest in Leanne. Tyldesley commented that Eva is Jealous that Leanne is married with a family because she split up from her fiancé just weeks before finding out Leanne is her half-sister. She also added that Stella is Eva's "territory" but also "she treats Leanne as a sister and would consider Leanne with Nick a complete betrayal."

She's angry. Eva doesn't want to share her mum. She's never had to share anything so why start now? But when she sees her mum upset because she thinks Leanne has ignored her birthday there's definitely a bit of guilt there. Eva's happy that somebody's finally in her corner because everything's been about Leanne and Stella. Eva's been forgotten and Karl can see that and he reminds Stella that she should be looking out for her other daughter, the one who's been around all along.

— Catherine Tyldesley explains Eva's emotions towards Leanne.

Tyldesley revealed in May 2012 that Nick will dump Eva in an upcoming episode after Eva accuses Nick of having an affair with Kylie. Speaking to All About Soap, she said that Eva likes a bit of drama and when Eva reveals to everyone in bistro that Nick is having an affair with Kylie and hinted that Eva goes too far. Tyldesley later added that Eva will fail to reconcile with Nick after she tries to "scheme" her way back into his affections. She explained that Eva hits rock bottom as she tries to cope without Nick in her life. She added: "She'd invested everything into the relationship and she's depressed and angry to say the least… she's well and truly gutted." After Eva's separation from Nick, Tyldesley said that she is keen for Eva to find some "fresh meat" and added that Eva will just "play with en" until the right person comes along. Tyldesley also claims that Eva is devastated by the loss of Nick and said that it will be sad not working with Ben Price as much. Tyldesley later predicted that Eva will "bounce back from her troubles". Speaking to Key 103, Tyldesley said: "They just keep throwing all these things at her – she's having a right time of it at the minute! But she's her mother's daughter, so I'm sure she'll get through it."

=== Relationship with Aidan Connor ===
In July 2015, it was reported by the Mirror that Eva who was currently on a hiatus at the time due to Tyldesley's maternity leave, would embark on a relationship with newcomer Aidan Connor played by Shayne Ward upon her return to the street later in the year. Asked about talk of a new romance for Eva, Tyldesley said: "Possibly. Anything can happen." Eva and Aidan later went on to begin a relationship with the two characters kissing at midnight on New Year's Eve. It was later announced that Eva and Aidan's relationship would soon become a love triangle with Aidan having a one-night stand with Maria Connor (Samia Ghadie), producer Kate Oates had previously spoken about the affair, saying: "No soap is complete without a good love triangle! We have got Aidan, who has had this one-night stand with Maria, and he's regretted it. Maria hasn't quite so much." After their one-night stand, Maria decides to end her relationship with Luke Britton (Dean Fagan), which makes Aidan think she really is in love with him and will tell his Eva all about the fling. Aidan later invited Maria to spend the night with him at a hotel and she's thrilled until Aidan makes it clear he's no intention of finishing with Eva. On 20 June 2017, it was revealed that Eva would discover that she's pregnant with Aidan's baby around the same time she discovers Aidan's affair with Maria. In an interview with Digital Spy, Tyldesley said: "If she'd found out she was pregnant a week previous, it would have been all she'd ever wanted. That was her goal – to meet a Prince Charming, settle down and have a family, but now she's discovered this, it's even more heartbreaking. She can't even begin to get her head round the fact that she's pregnant."

=== Departure ===
On 1 December 2017, Tyldesley announced that she had quit the role of Eva after portraying her for seven years. Speaking to The Sun about her departure, Tyldesley said "Coronation Street has been a dream job for me which is why this was such a difficult decision to leave. Eva has been such fun to play over the last seven years, and who knows, one day she might storm the cobbles of Weatherfield again. In the meantime I'm excited about the future, new acting projects, and spending time with my family." It was also confirmed that an exit storyline has been devised for Eva and that she would be leaving in early summer 2018. A Coronation Street spokesperson said: 'We can confirm that Cath Tyldesley will leave Coronation Street at the end of her current contract next year after seven years in the show". She filmed her final scenes on 20 June 2018 and departed on-screen on 3 August 2018.

=== Reintroduction ===
On 21 February 2025, it was reported that Tyldesley would reprise the role later in the year. On 2 August 2025, it reported that Eva would be the new landlady of The Rovers Return following the departure of landlady Jenny Bradley (Sally Ann Matthews). It was later announced that Eva would return alongside her daughter Susie and boyfriend Ben played by Aaron McCusker and his two sons and Pauline McLynn as Ben's mother Maggie. Discussing her return Tyldesley said: "I assumed when I was asked to come back that Eva would have loads of baggage and trauma, but no, that's not the case. There are obviously things that have happened in her past that we might see further down the line but in general, she's been having a lovely time." Her return scenes aired on 27 October 2025.

== Storylines ==
In June 2011, Stella Price's (Michelle Collins) daughter, Eva, arrives and announces that the wedding is off. Under pressure from Stella, Steve McDonald (Simon Gregson) agrees she can stay and Stella tells Eva that she has a home at The Rovers for as long as she needs it. When Eva is rude to Leanne Barlow (Jane Danson), Stella is quick to apologise and forces Eva to do the same, Eva later learns that Leanne is her half-sister. Stella and Eva are unimpressed as they clear up the debris from Becky McDonald's (Katherine Kelly) lock-in the night before.

Eva gets a job in Nick Tilsley's (Ben Price) Bistro and they start dating. Eva misunderstands a conversation with Nick about moving out, so she begins looking at flats for them. Nick later tells her that it is too soon for them to live together. Eva plans a speed dating night at the Bistro, which ends when Eileen Grimshaw (Sue Cleaver) pushes her date into the fire alarm. Luckily for Eileen, she is asked out by a fireman, Paul Kershaw (Tony Hirst). Nick and Eva continue dating but Stella warns Eva that Nick may break her heart. Nick finds Kylie Platt (Paula Lane) in a strip club and helps by booking a hotel room for the night as she cannot collect her son, Max, until the morning. When the pair return the next day, Eva finds a receipt from the hotel. Upon reading a text from Kylie, thanking him for the previous night, Eva announces publicly that Nick is cheating on her after ruining a big occasion in the Bistro and costing him a lot of business. Nick proves her wrong and dumps Eva for doubting him but allows to keep her job.

She later goes on a date with Jason Grimshaw (Ryan Thomas) to make Nick jealous. She believes that he is still interested but learns that he is in love with Leanne. The sisters have a vicious row and Leanne leaves The Rovers. Eva suspects Stella's boyfriend Karl Munro (John Michie) is having an affair with Sunita Alahan (Shobna Gulati), and warns them that she knows what is going on. In June 2012, Eva and Sunita are left in charge of The Rovers while Stella is on a business trip, Beth Tinker (Lisa George) accidentally lets her son Craig Tinker's (Colson Smith) pet rat, Darryl, loose in The Rovers. When the health inspector arrives, Eva and Sunita distract him and The Rovers passes. Eva's suspicions are confirmed when returning from a night out with Stella and Leanne, they catch Karl and Sunita together.

Eva begins dating Rob Donovan (Marc Baylis). The couple separate briefly but reconcile after Rob tries flirting with Stella but Eva suspects that Rob is cheating on her with Michelle Connor (Kym Marsh). Eva and Michelle's boyfriend, Steve, visit the hotel that they are staying in on a business trip and finds Rob with a waitress at the hotel, not Michelle. The couple split up and Eva sets her sights on her ex-boyfriend, Nick. Eva and Kylie, who also dislikes Leanne, plan to split Nick and Leanne up by getting Nick to propose, the day after her divorce from Peter Barlow (Chris Gascoyne) has come through. Unfortunately for Eva, Leanne accepts. After Peter returns from Los Angeles, Eva makes a false booking at the Bistro, so Nick misses Simon Barlow's (Alex Bain) nativity play. He becomes paranoid about Peter and Leanne, causing an argument between him and Leanne after he has a fight with Peter at the school. On Christmas Day, Eva is Leanne's bridesmaid. At the wedding, she tells Nick that Leanne visited Peter that morning. Nick calls the wedding off and Eva hopes for a reconciliation with Nick, only for him to reject her. Nick and Leanne reconcile in January.

When Eva's grandmother, Gloria Price (Sue Johnston), visits with her fiancé Eric Babbage (Timothy West), Eva is shocked when Eric offers to take Eva on a cruise and says that he knows that Gloria is only marrying him for his money. Eva initially turns him down, but after a fight with Tracy Barlow (Kate Ford), she reconsiders. Stella discovers Eric's plan and is disgusted by his betrayal. She persuades Eva not to go and finds Eric dead in the bar. Gloria is devastated by Eric's death and Eva and Gloria temporarily fall out. In March 2013, Eva and Gloria attend Eric's funeral and make up. On 18 March 2013, Karl sets The Rovers on fire, leaving Stella and Sunita trapped inside. When they hear about the fire, Eva, Leanne and Gloria rush to the scene and the pub explodes. Karl rushes in to save Stella and they escape but fire fighter, Toni Griffiths (Tara Moran), is killed. Stella, Sunita and Karl are all rushed to hospital and the Price family are told that Sunita is a prime suspect as the arsonist. Sunita dies after Karl pulls her life support machine tubes out and Eva and Gloria are dismayed at Karl and Stella for attending Sunita's funeral, believing her to be guilty. In May, Eva goes to Ibiza to stay with an old school friend, Mitch.

Eva returns to Weatherfield later that month, and is shocked to discover that The Rovers is up for sale, and Stella is now a cleaner at the Bistro, and is angry at Leanne for letting her do this. Eva comforts her mother. While the Price family discuss what to do about Owen Armstrong (Ian Puleston-Davies) suing Stella for the work done on The Rovers, Gloria makes a shock announcement. Eric left her £80,000 and she kept it because she felt that it was something for herself, angering her family. The next day, Gloria visits Owen and pays Stella's bill. Eva, Gloria, Stella and Karl are stunned when Leanne offers £5,000, so Stella only has to find £5,000. Eva is present when Stella, Karl and Gloria re-open The Rovers Return. Eva is furious when Leanne refuses to be Stella's bridesmaid. The next day, David Platt (Jack P. Shepherd) overhears Eva saying that Leanne is very selfish and tells Leanne and Nick, causing Leanne and Eva to argue at Underworld and accidentally knocks Hayley Cropper (Julie Hesmondhalgh), recently been diagnosed with pancreatic cancer. Eva's boss Carla Barlow (Alison King) throws Leanne out and Leanne gets a mysterious letter, asking if she knows who Nick was with – and what he was doing – on Christmas night, she confides in Stella and Eva shows little sympathy. When she sees Eva talking to Nick, Leanne suspects that they are having an affair, which Eva denies. After Nick and David are involved in a horrific car accident, Eva and Leanne finally make amends and eventually become close.

During a karaoke night at The Rovers to celebrate Roy Cropper's (David Neilson) birthday, Eva goes to Jason's house for a drink and they sleep together. The following day, Eva feels guilty as Jason is Stella's ex-boyfriend and Stella catches them kissing. Gloria shouts at them but Stella insists she is fine with the blossoming romance before telling Eva and Gloria that she wants to sell The Rovers. Eva helps Kylie when she believes that David is having an affair with Tina McIntyre (Michelle Keegan). Eva follows Kylie when she storms into The Rovers and starts a fight with Tina. Eva and Liz McDonald (Beverley Callard) try to break them up but Kylie accidentally slaps Eva. Eva is present when Kylie finds Lily's DNA results and Kylie lies about the contents of the envelope when she realizes what it is. Eva attends Lily's christening with Stella and Gloria and the family comfort Leanne when she discovers that Kylie and Nick slept together on Christmas Day 2012. Eva is angry that Kylie didn't come clean when Leanne had accused her of sleeping with Nick. Kylie tries to apologize but Eva ends their friendship.

Eva is promoted at work when she shows good computer skills and replaces Michelle as Carla's personal assistant. Eva and her colleagues are devastated in January 2014 when they learn that Hayley has died. They decorate her sewing machine at Underworld with colourful pants in her memory. Eva is upset when Gloria announces that she is going on a cruise around the world. Eva helps organize her farewell party and wave goodbye to Gloria and Dennis Tanner (Philip Lowrie), as they leave. When Eva, Leanne and Stella's landlord, Kevin Webster (Michael Le Vell) returns with his son Jack, Eva moves in with Jason. Eva is extremely upset when she learns that Stella is also planning to leave and angry as she feels her mother is abandoning her. Eva and Stella later put their differences aside as Stella bids them a tearful farewell before leaving Weatherfield in a black cab. Eva and Jason buy a flat above the Prima Doner kebab shop. Eva is disgusted in October 2014 when she discovers that Kylie has been taking Max's ADHD medication. Eva accompanies Kylie to her childhood estate to meet Max's biological father, Callum Logan (Sean Ward). She leaves, while Kylie spends time with Callum and old friend, Gemma Winter (Dolly-Rose Campbell). Kylie leaves on Christmas Day 2014 and Eva tries to help David find her but they are unsuccessful.

In February 2015, Eva leaves after Jason accuses her of having an affair with his father, Tony Stewart (Terence Maynard), and goes to France, where she meets someone, devastating Jason. She gets engaged to a French man but they end it in September and she returns to Weatherfield. Eva is shocked to learn that Jason is injured after being attacked by Callum and tries to reunite with him, but he turns her down. Eva gets her job back at Underworld and dates new boss Aidan Connor (Shayne Ward). Unknown to Eva, Leanne has been physically abused by Simon and doesn't know how much more she can take. When Simon spots Leanne and Eva looking relaxed, he gets angry again. Simon and Amy are left at Ken's house and Simon hurts Amy. Amy tells Ken and Tracy, who contact Leanne and Leanne admits that Simon has been hurting her. Leanne has to take Simon home and the family agree to get him some help.

In February 2016, she finds a girl named Marta Zarek (Edyta Budnik), hiding in Underworld and tries to call the police. Marta begs her not to, explaining that she is a slave and if she quits, her house will be burned down. Eva allows Marta to stay with her and Leanne but hides when Aidan comes over. Eva tells vicar Billy Mayhew (Daniel Brocklebank) about Marta and she stays with him. However, Eva is caught looking for Marta's passport at the O'Driscolls', they ask her to leave and demand she is sacked from Underworld. Needing the work that the O'Driscolls can provide, Aidan reluctantly agrees. They tell Eva that Marta was a lodger, not a slave, but she goes missing after stealing Billy's watch. Eva and Billy find Marta and take her to the O'Driscolls' house, but Marta seems frightened. They break in and are arrested. They tell the police that Marta was kept as a slave and the O'Driscolls are arrested. Marta gets her passport back and goes home and Eva gets her job back after impressing Aidan with a new deal.

Eva rekindles her relationship with Aidan. However, he struggles to make a commitment and has a drunken one-night stand with Maria Connor (Samia Longchambon) and is wracked with guilt. She becomes suspicious after Caz Hammond (Rhea Bailey), mentions that Aidan was at Maria's flat. However, Maria convinces her boyfriend Luke Britton (Dean Fagan) and Eva that Aidan wanted to buy a flat him and Eva and asked Maria for advice. In October 2016, Eva becomes close friends with Maria and help her when she is suspected of murdering Caz but Aidan and Maria begin an affair. After Maria is sentenced to twelve months imprisonment for marrying Pablo Duarte (Shai Matheson) so he can stay in the country, Eva looks out for her and her son, Liam Connor Jr. (Charlie Wrenshall). In January 2017, she confronts Aidan, thinking that he is having an affair with Alya Nazir (Sair Khan), after Jenny Bradley (Sally Ann Matthews) stirs up trouble. Aidan insists that he and Alya are not having an affair and they confront Jenny. A few days later, Eva overhears Simon and Leanne's stepsister Toyah Battersby (Georgia Taylor) arguing and after comforting Simon, learns that Toyah is sleeping with Peter, and blackmails them not to tell Leanne. However, Leanne finds out and stops speaking to Eva and Toyah for their betrayals but eventually they forgive each other. While on a shift at The Rovers, Michelle throws Eva out when she objects to her staging a lock-in over Steve's infidelity with Leanne, which resulted in the birth of Leanne's son, Oliver.

In June 2017, after numerous attempts to encourage him to propose, Eva proposes to Aidan and he accepts. A few weeks later, however, on returning from France early, Eva takes a pregnancy test as her period is late. As she is about to show Leanne the result of the test, a text message from Maria flashes on the television saying how much she wants to see Aidan again. Eva realizes that Maria and Aidan are having an affair. After kicking the television, Eva checks the test, it is positive. Just to be sure, Eva takes another test and, just as Aidan is about to end their relationship, she tells Aidan that she is pregnant. However, she is lying, which she tells Leanne the next day. Eva tells Leanne she is going to get revenge on Aidan without telling him that she knows about him and Maria. Initially Leanne thinks Eva is going too far but after seeing Aidan and Maria together, they work together. Especially after Aidan gives Eva his credit card, she buys a pink Range Rover to anger him. Later, Toyah finds out and helps her with her plan to expose him, making the pair closer. Eva plots her revenge on Aidan with Adam Barlow (Sam Robertson) after he sees them kiss, continuing the lie that she is pregnant and appoints Maria as head bridesmaid, sending her on numerous errands whilst acting as her best friend. At hers and Jenny's joint hen party, Eva's bride piñata covers Maria in chocolate milk but whilst cleaning herself up afterwards, Maria finds the baby scan picture that Toyah found on the internet and tells Eva that she cannot come to the wedding as Liam is ill, putting Eva and Adam's plans in jeopardy. The next day, the wedding day, Eva gives Adam the factory keys which they planned to take over in revenge. However, Aidan admits that he had an affair, Eva decides she can't go through with the plan and decides to marry him after all. Just as she and Aidan are about to say their vows, Maria bursts in and exposes Eva's fake pregnancy. After Eva has a fight with Maria in the fountains at the wedding venue, she climbs out of her bedroom window to declare her love for Aidan but almost falls and has to take her dress off in order for Aidan to save her. Eva texts Adam to thank him for not going through with the plan, unaware that he has had the entire factory ripped out, including the roof. She and Aidan nearly agree to work things out but he ends things with her after finding out she was part of the factory plan. Aidan's father Johnny Connor (Richard Hawley) reports Eva to the police where she angrily vows to Adam that she intends to take him to prison with her. However, Adam later admits his feelings for Eva and they kiss, beginning a relationship.

Eva later finds out she is pregnant with Aidan's baby, and calls off her relationship with Adam. She keeps her pregnancy a secret and only tells Toyah about it, who has recently found out that the surrogate mother carrying her and Peter's child has miscarried. Seeing how heartbroken Toyah is, they come up with a plan together that Toyah will pretend Eva's child is hers, as Eva doesn't want a child; whereas Toyah desperately does. However, Eva starts to develop feelings towards her unborn baby and Toyah sees this and calls off the deal. Eva tells Aidan that she is pregnant with his child but he doesn't believe her, and so she tells Toyah that the deal is back on. The next day, she leaves Weatherfield to give birth in secret pretending to everyone she is doing a beauty course in New York. Eva goes to stay at a cottage which Toyah regularly visits in secret. After getting trapped in the cottage's bathroom, Eva goes into labour but Toyah comes to her rescue and helps her give birth to a girl who Toyah and Peter name Susie; in honour of Peter's late sister Susan Barlow (Joanna Foster).

A few days later, Aidan visits Eva, who is unaware that he is depressed and he tells her that he wants to say goodbye properly to her as he thinks she is moving abroad and they dance together, telling each other they love each other before Aidan says goodbye to her, giving her back her engagement ring. Eva leaves a voicemail to Aidan telling him she wants to talk before playing the song they danced to. However, later on that night he commits suicide. The next day, she returns to the street to get back together with Aidan and is left heartbroken when she finds out about his death. Eva gets close to Susie, spending as much time with her as possible and after Aidan's funeral, Toyah confesses to Peter that their own surrogate baby had died, and that Susie is actually Eva and Aidan's baby; with Eva vowing the keep her. Johnny tries to get Susie from Eva and they begin a feud with Eva blaming him for Aidan's suicide. Susie later suffers a fall- although she is fine, Johnny takes this opportunity to report Eva to social services, in a bid to take Susie off Eva. When this fails and Eva is granted custody at the mediation, Susie is kidnapped by Johnny. Susie is later found safe by Liz and returned to Eva, with the police arresting Johnny. Eva decides not to press charges against him and to leave Weatherfield, sneaking out without Leanne or Toyah knowing. On the way out of the pub, Eva is spotted by Adam who she has told she is leaving and he says he wants to come with her. Subsequently, the pair, along with baby Susie; leave for France with a note left for Leanne and Toyah. The trio return the following week for Aidan's inquest where Eva tells everyone how much she loved and cared for Aidan, leading to Adam changing his mind about leaving, and stays behind in Weatherfield. Later that day, Eva and Susie leave again in the back of a taxi after saying goodbye to Leanne and Toyah, and making amends with Johnny.

== Reception ==
Kate White of Inside Soap praised the character, saying "Sexy, sassy and often a proper bitch, Eva's by far the most interesting girl in Weatherfield right now. She's got the makings of a classic Corrie woman. Think Karen, think Bet." A writer for the Daily Mirror nicknamed the character "Eva The Diva", while another called Eva "snobby". Laura Armstrong from The People described Eva as a "fit barmaid" and later added that "her shifts at Nick's Bistro seem like a stroll in a Manchester park". Sue Crawford from the Daily Mirror branded Eva "ditzy". Paul Martinovic of Digital Spy called Eva a "maneater".

In August 2017, Tyldesley was longlisted for "Best Actress", "Best Bad Girl" and "Sexiest Female" at the Inside Soap Awards. She made the viewer-voted shortlist for the "Sexiest Female" award, but lost out to Natalie J. Robb, who portrays Moira Dingle in Emmerdale. In June 2018, Tyldesley was nominated for "Best Actress" and "Best Single Episode" at The British Soap Awards 2018 and even made the shortlist for the "Best Actress" accolade, however she lost out to Coronation Street co-star, Lucy Fallon, who portrays Bethany Platt. In July 2018, Tyldesley was longlisted for "Best Actress" at the Inside Soap Awards. She progressed to the viewer-voted shortlist in October 2018. For her portrayal of Eva, Tyldesley was nominated for Best Soap Actor (Female) at the 2018 Digital Spy Reader Awards; she came in sixth place with 7.8% of the total vote.
