= List of Coronation Street characters introduced in 2006 =

The following is a list of characters that first appeared in the ITV soap opera Coronation Street in 2006, by order of first appearance.

== Aadi Alahan ==
Aadi Alahan
- Coronation Street character
- Portrayed by: Hannah, Harris and Ria Ahmed (2006); Zennon Ditchett (2009–2019); Adam Hussain (2020–2025)
- Duration: 2006, 2009–2025
- First appearance: 13 January 2006
- Last appearance: 26 August 2025
- Introduced by: Tony Wood (2006); Kim Crowther (2009); Iain MacLeod (2020)
In-universe information
- Occupation: Student; Trainee Manager
- Father: Dev Alahan
- Mother: Sunita Alahan
- Stepmother: Bernie Winter
- Sisters: Asha Alahan
- Half-sisters: Amber Kalirai; Shareen
- Grandfathers: Ranjiv Alahan; Suresh Parekh
- Grandmothers: Urmila Alahan; Mena Parekh
- Uncles: Jayesh Parekh
- First cousins: Jaya Parekh
- Other relatives: Grishma Parekh; Upma Parekh; Aunty Rani

Aadi Alahan, who first appears on 13 January 2006, is introduced alongside his twin sister Asha Alahan (Tanisha Gorey) as the newborn children of Sunita Alahan (Shobna Gulati) and Dev Alahan (Jimmi Harkishin). Aadi and Asha are originally portrayed by triplets Hannah, Harris and Ria Ahmed. The characters were written out following Gulati's decision to leave the soap and depart in February 2006. The character, along with Sunita and Asha, was reintroduced in 2009 with the role recast to Zennon Ditchett. Ditchett opted to leave the show in 2019 to focus on his schooling, so the role was recast to Adam Hussain, who first appears on 15 April 2020. Aadi features in a new story following his recast as Asha becomes the victim to a sexting scandal. Hussain expressed his excitement at joining the soap and wanted to develop his "own twist" on the character. Hussain and Gorey were friends prior to his casting, which he thought assisted the portrayal of the twins' relationship. Gary Gillatt of Inside Soap praised Hussain's casting, commenting, "The new Aadi Alahan is really well cast. He has the same cocky swagger as his dad."

Aadi was born in January 2006, just before Asha. In March 2006, Sunita still had not got back together with Dev and decided to leave Weatherfield with Aadi and Asha. In late 2009, Aadi and Asha returned when Sunita resumed her relationship with Dev. They moved into Dev's flat in March 2010, after Dev and Sunita reconciled. Aadi and Asha thought it would be funny if Aadi went out onto the balcony of the flat; however, when Sunita tried to get him in, she could not and Dev broke the handle when he tried to open the closed balcony door. After many attempts they failed, though Graeme Proctor (Craig Gazey) was riding by and came to the rescue just as Sunita was going to call 999. In April 2013, Aadi and Asha lost their mother when Sunita died from her injuries following a fire in The Rovers - the fire being started by her ex-boyfriend Karl Munro (John Michie), who also turned off her life support machine at hospital. Following a video of Asha undressing for her crush, Corey Brent (Maximus Evans), being spread around the pupils of Weatherfield High by Kelly Neelan (Millie Gibson), Dev was dissatisfied by the headteacher's response, and enrolled Aadi and Asha into Oakhill School.

In 2025, after Dev found out that Aadi's mismanagement of the corner shop had left him in debt, and he'd experimented with LSD, he arranged for his son to work for Vikram Desai in India.

== Asha Alahan ==
Asha Alahan
- Coronation Street character
- Portrayed by: Hannah, Harris & Ria Ahmed (2006); Tanisha Gorey (2009–present)
- Duration: 2006, 2009–present
- First appearance: 13 January 2006
- Introduced by: Tony Wood (2006); Kim Crowther (2009)
- Crossover appearances: Corriedale (2026)
In-universe information
- Occupation: Kebab shop server Waitress; Student paramedic
- Father: Dev Alahan
- Mother: Sunita Alahan
- Stepmother: Bernie Winter
- Brothers: Aadi Alahan
- Half-sisters: Amber Kalirai; Shareen
- Grandfathers: Ranjiv Alahan; Suresh Parekh
- Grandmothers: Urmila Alahan; Mena Parekh
- Uncles: Jayesh Parekh
- First cousins: Jaya Parekh
- Other relatives: Grishma Parekh; Upma Parekh; Aunty Rani

Asha Alahan played by triplets Hannah, Harris and Ria Ahmed in 2006 and Tanisha Gorey since 2009, is one of the twins born to Sunita (Shobna Gulati) and Dev Alahan (Jimmi Harkishin), alongside her twin brother Aadi Alahan (Zennon Ditchett / Adam Hussain) in January 2006.

Before the birth, Sunita had learnt that Dev had fathered children by several different women. Devastated, she left Dev after deciding she could no longer trust him and had even considered having a termination rather than be a single mother.

Dev had hoped for a reunion once the twins were born but after initially allowing him in the delivery room, Sunita barred him from all contact and only accepted help from him when he was too exhausted to refuse. Seeing how well Dev coped, Sunita briefly flirted with the idea of a reunion but was furious when she discovered Dev had registered the births behind her back and realising she still couldn't trust him, took Aadi and Asha and moved back in with her family.

Sunita subsequently divorced Dev, but they kept in regular contact. By December 2009 she was engaged to another man named Matt and living with him in the house she'd bought with Dev prior to their separation. Matt had taken on the responsibility of Aadi and Asha and they quickly became comfortable with him as a father figure.

After Dev discovered Sunita's engagement, he began making visits to her house and trying to spend more time with Aadi and Asha, not wanting them to forget him. In January 2010, Asha fell ill and Sunita feared that she had meningitis after discovering she had spots and high temperature. Dev rushed to her side and although the doctor from the medical centre confirmed it was just a virus, the incident brought them closer together. Shortly afterwards, Sunita ended her engagement to Matt and resumed her relationship with Dev and by March 2010, they were living together with Aadi and Asha at Dev's flat. Another move soon followed to where the Alahans made their family home.

The family unit was disrupted in July 2012 after Sunita's affair with Karl Munro (John Michie) was exposed, leading Dev to move out and Karl to move in with her, Aadi and Asha. Aadi and Asha did not like Karl very much and Sunita soon got fed up of his laziness and regretted throwing away her marriage for him. By March 2013, Dev and Sunita were on the brink of another reunion and leaving for a fresh start away from Weatherfield when Sunita was critically injured in a fire at the Rovers. After a couple of weeks, Sunita died in hospital and it later transpired that Karl was responsible for the fire and removing her breathing tubes.

Dev struggled to cope with Aadi and Asha alone but Mary Taylor (Patti Clare) offered him a helping hand and soon became a nanny to Aadi and Asha. Several girlfriends came and went over the next few years - including Julie Carp (Katy Cavanagh), Erica Holroyd (Claire King) and Gina Seddon (Connie Hyde) but Mary remained a constant in Asha and Aadi's lives.

In 2019, Asha began to rebel against Dev, such as sneaking out to a party he had forbidden her from going to. Dev assumed this was down to teenage hormones and believed an extended visit to India to stay with family would be beneficial. When they returned, Asha was more withdrawn and began spending a lot of time in her bedroom and when she did go outside, she remained covered in long clothing. When Asha returned to school in September 2019, her friend Amy Barlow (Elle Mulvaney) became increasingly concerned about her, especially after discovering a bloodstain on her sleeve. When Amy confronted Asha, believing she was self-harming, Asha revealed that she had actually been using a skin bleaching product in the hope of making her skin lighter. Amy was horrified by Asha's burnt skin and Asha assured her she would stop to prevent her telling Dev but secretly continued applying the cream.

Running out of the product, Asha was desperate for money to get some more, even accepting Dev's ultimatum that she would have to work for extra money at the kebab shop, but when he refused her an advance on her wages she resorted to stealing his credit card to buy some more lightening cream but Dev soon discovered the fraud. When confronted, Asha lied that she had used the money to buy make-up and Dev furiously punished her but his suspicions were aroused when a package arrived for her and opened it, discovering the skin lightening cream and ripped posters of light-skinned Bollywood actresses off Asha's wall in anger. Realising that Asha was full of self-loathing, Dev took her to Dr. Gaddas (Christine Mackie) who recommended counselling sessions. At the same time Asha began a relationship with Corey Brent (Maximus Evans).

Corey later ended the relationship but Asha still liked him and in an attempt to impress him, undressed during an online video chat, which he recorded. Kelly Neelan (Millie Gibson) later became aware of the video's existence and after a disagreement at a party held by Amy, in which Asha refused to stick up for Kelly, she spitefully shared it on social media. Asha was dealt a further blow when she learnt the video had been uploaded to a porn site. Asha even became desperate to leave Weatherfield High because of the incident but was persuaded not to by Dev.

== Becky McDonald ==
Becky McDonald (also Granger) played by Katherine Kelly, first appeared on 5 December 2006 and last appeared on 23 January 2012.

== Michelle Connor ==
Michelle Connor (also McDonald) played by Kym Marsh, first appeared on 3 April 2006 and last appeared on 27 December 2019.

== Brian Tully ==
Brian Tully
- Coronation Street character
- Portrayed by: Tim Healy
- First appearance: 5 June 2006
- Last appearance: 18 June 2006
In-universe information
- Wife: Maureen Tully (1975–2005)
- Daughters: Angela Tully
- Stepsons: Sean Tully

Brian Tully, portrayed by former Auf Wiedersehen, Pet actor Tim Healy is the alleged father of Sean Tully (Antony Cotton). He first appeared on 5 June 2006 after not seeing Sean for nineteen years. Healy had previously appeared in Coronation Street in 1976, thirty years prior to appearing as Brian. Healy spoke about working on the soap: "It's really god fun [working on the Street]. I'm just having a laugh and I've been really welcomed in by all the cast and crew so I feel like I've been here for ages. I did one episode of Corrie in 1976!"

Kris Green from Digital Spy explained Brian's character: "His character is a fairly rich businessman who owns his own haulage company but he hasn't seen his son in nineteen years and the situation is even more complicated than it seems." Healy spoke about his character: "He feels extremely guilty at first, and as the plot starts to develop they start to see each other more, and they become friends." He continued: "It's quite difficult at first because Brian has a problem in the background that he doesn't want to go into, which makes it difficult for him to go and see Sean."

== DS Phil Campbell ==
DS Phil Campbell
- Coronation Street character
- Portrayed by: Gary Cargill
- Duration: 2006–2008
- First appearance: 9 June 2006
- Last appearance: 28 April 2008
In-universe information
- Occupation: Police Officer

Detective Sergeant Phil Campbell is a police officer. Campbell is first seen investigating a hit-and-run accident in which an elderly man was killed. He arrests Steve McDonald (Simon Gregson) for causing death by dangerous driving and Steve implicates his girlfriend Ronnie Clayton (Emma Stansfield) who is the actual culprit and is subsequently arrested. The following month, Campbell questions Danny Baldwin (Bradley Walsh) on suspicion of fraud after it is revealed he had forged a will in order to get his father Mike (Johnny Briggs), who suffered from Alzheimer's disease, to leave him his factory. Campbell arrests Tracy Barlow (Kate Ford) and charges her with assaulting Charlie Stubbs (Bill Ward). After Charlie dies of his injuries, Campbell charges Tracy with murder. Campbell questions Tracy's neighbours Claire Peacock (Julia Haworth) and Gail Platt (Helen Worth) both of whom claim Charlie was subjecting Tracy to domestic violence and abuse. Campbell also questions Charlie's employee Jason Grimshaw (Ryan Thomas) who tells them that Tracy staged a deliberate row in order to get the police involved. David Platt (Jack P. Shepherd) later visits the police station and tells Campbell that he witnessed Tracy kill Charlie in self-defence after he had attacked her with a knife. David also tells Campbell that Charlie had attempted to abduct him in his van and had also attempted to drown him in his bathtub. Campbell later speaks to Liam Connor (Rob James-Collier) who witnessed the abduction attempt and Maria Sutherland (Samia Ghadie) who witnessed the attempted drowning and they both back David's story up. Campbell was last seen investigating the arson attack at Leanne Battersby's (Jane Danson) restaurant "Valandros" committed by chef Paul Clayton (Tom Hudson). After Paul reports himself and Leanne to the police, Campbell arrests Leanne and questions her but her boyfriend Dan Mason (Matthew Crompton) gives her an alibi.

In October 2004, Cargill played a police officer called DC Paul Campbell, who arrested Dev (Jimmi Harkishin) and Sunita Alahan (Shobna Gulati) on their wedding day, Dev on suspicion of being an illegal immigrant and Sunita for falsely marrying to gain a visa. It is not known whether this was supposed to be the same character under a different name.

== Mr. Griffin ==
Mr. Griffin
- Coronation Street character
- Portrayed by: Roger Morlidge
- Duration: 2006–2007, 2009, 2016, 2020
- First appearance: 18 June 2006
- Last appearance: 1 June 2020
- Introduced by: Steve Frost (2006); Kim Crowther (2009); Kate Oates (2016); Iain Macleod (2020)
In-universe information
- Occupation: Headmaster

Mr. Griffin is the Head Teacher at Weatherfield High who commonly appears in storylines concerning David Platt (Jack P. Shepherd) in 2006 when he began to play truant from school and when he claimed that he was being bullied by three lads the year above him, whose names he revealed under pressure from Griffin. He appears throughout 2007, when he has a meeting with Cilla Battersby-Brown (Wendi Peters) regarding her terminal cancer diagnosis and how it had affected her son, Chesney Brown (Sam Ashton) at school, and again when he visits the Platt family home, 8 Coronation Street after David set fire to one of his exam papers. He appeared again two years later when Chesney's sister Fiz Brown (Jennie McAlpine) was about to punch Kenzie Judd (Jack Cooper) for bullying him.

After a seven-year absence, Mr Griffin reappeared on 30 September 2016 at a meeting to deal with Lauren (Shannon Flynn) for bullying Bethany Platt (Lucy Fallon). Mr. Griffin returns in 2020 in a meeting with Dev Alahan (Jimmi Harkishin) regarding a fight involving Aadi Alahan (Adam Hussain) and Corey Brent (Maximus Evans). Where Dev announces he is taking both Asha Alahan (Tanisha Gorey) and Aadi out of Weatherfield High and is moving them both to Oak Hill.

== Maureen Tully ==
Maureen Tully
- Coronation Street character
- Portrayed by: Susan Brown
- First appearance: 26 June 2006
- Last appearance: 28 June 2006
In-universe information
- Sisters: Angie
- Husband: Brian Tully (1975–2005)
- Sons: Sean Tully
- Daughters: Angela Tully
- Grandsons: Dylan Wilson

Maureen Tully, portrayed by Susan Brown, is the mother of Sean Tully (Antony Cotton). She first appeared on 26 June 2006 following the departure of her husband, Brian Tully (Tim Healy), whom she told Sean was his father. However, she later reveals that Sean's biological father is a man named Paul Jones, a plumber who Maureen met at a dance. Before Brown's first appearance, Kris Green from Digital Spy teased the paternity revelations. He said: "The next couple of weeks are hard for Sean as he has to deal with more than just getting to know his father - there's a shocking revelation in store..." Maureen Tully is Brown's second role in Coronation Street after playing series regular Andrea Clayton in 1985, a role that was subsequently recast to Irene Skillington when the character was reintroduced in 2000.

== Freddie Peacock ==
Freddie Peacock
- Coronation Street character
- Portrayed by: Leo & Max Johnson (2006) Jack & Jake Rogers (2006); Dylan & Hayden Whitbread (2006–2009); Lewis & Niall Beresford (2009–2011)
- Duration: 2006–2011
- First appearance: 17 July 2006
- Last appearance: 14 January 2011
- Introduced by: Steve Frost
In-universe information
- Other names: Thomas Peacock
- Father: Ashley Peacock
- Mother: Claire Peacock
- Brothers: Joshua Peacock (adoptive)
- Grandfathers: Fred Elliott
- Grandmothers: Yvonne Casey; Kathleen Gutteridge; Beryl Peacock (adoptive)
- Other relatives: Beryl Peacock

Frederick Thomas "Freddie" Peacock (also Thomas Duncan Peacock) is the son of Ashley (Steven Arnold) and Claire Peacock (Julia Haworth). On Christmas Day 2005, Claire tells Ashley that she is two months pregnant, and months later, Freddie is born on 17 July 2006. Claire suffers from post natal depression after Freddie is born, refusing to believe that Freddie is her child. On one occasion, she pushes his pram into the path of an oncoming vehicle and tries to return him to the hospital. She is sectioned until she is well enough to come home.

In October 2006, Claire announces that she would like to change his name from Thomas to Freddie, after his paternal grandfather Fred Elliott (John Savident) who died the week before. In December 2006, he is christened Frederick Thomas with Eileen Grimshaw (Sue Cleaver) as godmother and Roy Cropper (David Neilson) as his godfather.

In May 2007, a fire starts in Freddie's bedroom. Claire is rescued from the burning building but Freddie is not found until later that day, wrapped up in a local park. It is revealed that the fire was started deliberately by use of an accelerant. Originally, this storyline was to last several months but was rewritten to avoid upsetting the family of Madeleine McCann, who disappeared two weeks previously. In September 2007, the identity of Freddie's abductor is revealed to be Claire's former friend, Casey Carswell (Zoe Henry). Casey abducts Freddie and takes him to the balcony of her flat where she threatens to jump with him. Freddie is rescued unharmed and Casey is arrested.

When a tram crashes on to the Street on 6 December 2010, Ashley is killed when the roof of 'The Joinery' Bar collapses and he is crushed by the debris. Freddie and Joshua are subsequently left without a father. In January 2011, Claire attacks Tracy Barlow (Kate Ford) after she makes insulting remarks about Ashley and after Becky McDonald (Katherine Kelly) is arrested for assaulting Tracy and leaving her for dead, she confesses to the police. Her friends persuade her to leave the country to avoid a prison sentence and take her sons with her. Freddie, Claire and Joshua leave for France on 14 January 2011.

== Cameron McIntyre ==
Cameron McIntyre
- Coronation Street character
- Portrayed by: Ryan Cook
- First appearance: 24 July 2006
- Last appearance: 7 August 2006
In-universe information
- Occupation: Student

Cameron McIntyre is a school friend of Chesney Brown (Sam Aston) and Sophie Webster (Brooke Vincent), often causing trouble.

When he first appears, Sophie doesn't really like him. Later that day, the trio prank call all the contacts on Sophie's mother Sally's (Sally Dynevor) phone, and Sophie begins to develop a crush on him. At Chesney's twelfth birthday party, Sophie is quietly upset that Cameron can't attend. However, to Sophie's relief, he turns up later on with a card for Chesney, and they go out again. Later on, Sophie, Chesney and Cameron hang out at Sophie's house to watch a horror film that Chesney borrowed from his stepfather Les' DVD collection. Sally walks in on them, and orders the trio outside to play after seeing that the film is rated 18, annoying Chesney's mother Cilla (Wendi Peters) in the Rovers. In the ginnel later that week, Sophie and Chesney meet up with Cameron again and soon find out he has cigarettes in hand. Chesney refuses to smoke, but Sophie takes a cigarette but unfortunately, Sally smells smoke and sends Chesney away as he hides the cigarettes. Cameron and Chesney briefly fall out, but make up again and go to watch films with Sophie. The trio are caught again by Sally and Chesney is sent packing. When Sally discovers £5 is missing from her purse, she assumes Chesney stole it. Sophie is the one who took the money to buy cigarettes for her and Cameron, and when Sophie tells Cameron that she is going to tell her mother what happened, he makes an excuse to go home to avoid getting into trouble and runs away from the street, leaving Sophie devastated. He also has two brothers named Alex Cook and Calum Cook.

Cameron is of no relation to Joe (Reece Dinsdale) and Tina McIntyre (Michelle Keegan), both of whom first appeared on the programme in 2008.

== Liam Connor ==
Liam Connor played by Rob James-Collier, first appeared on episode 6369 broadcast on 30 August 2006 and last appeared on episode 6928 broadcast on 17 October 2008.

== Ryan Connor ==
Ryan Connor played by Ben Thompson (2006-2010), Sol Heras (2012-2013), Ryan Prescott (2018-present), first appeared on 30 August 2006.

== Paul Connor ==
Paul Connor played by Sean Gallagher, first appeared on episode 6374 broadcast on 6 September 2006 and last appeared on episode 6571 broadcast on 6 June 2007.

== Carla Connor ==
Carla Connor (also Barlow and Gordon) played Alison King, first appeared on 1 December 2006.

== Slug ==
Slug
- Coronation Street character
- Portrayed by: Marshall Lancaster
- Duration: 2006–2007, 2009
- First appearance: 18 December 2006
- Last appearance: 7 September 2009
- Introduced by: Steve Frost
In-universe information
- Occupation: Drug dealer

Slug (real name Neil Ackroyd) is an old friend of Becky Granger's (Katherine Kelly), who first appears in December 2006. He is a drug dealer and user who takes advantage of Becky. He causes trouble for her and her friends Roy (David Neilson) and Hayley Cropper (Julie Hesmondhalgh), especially when he "borrowed" their car and subsequently damaged it.

In June 2009 Slug returns, apparently a reformed man. It is later revealed that he is working for DC Hooch, a corrupt police officer who is an enemy of Becky's and wants her in prison. Slug plants drugs on Becky and she is subsequently arrested. Becky's fiancé Steve McDonald (Simon Gregson) and his colleague and friend Lloyd Mullaney (Craig Charles) find out about Slug's involvement and track him down. They bundle him into a car, drive him back to the street and question him. When they bring him to Hooch, Hooch decides to drop the charges, scared Slug will tell the police about him.

== Sonny Dhillon ==
Sonny Dhillon
- Coronation Street character
- Portrayed by: Pal Aron
- Duration: 2006–2007
- First appearance: 22 December 2006
- Last appearance: 11 March 2007

Sundeep "Sonny" Dhillon played by Pal Aron. Sonny is Michelle Connor's (Kym Marsh) millionaire boyfriend. It comes to light that Sonny has relationship history with Sean Tully (Antony Cotton), in that they had previously been dating, with Sonny admitting to being bisexual. On the Streetcars lads' night out Steve McDonald (Simon Gregson) spots Sean and Sonny kissing. In late February 2007, Sonny proposes to Michelle. While she is in The Rovers celebrating, a jealous Steve tells her that Sonny is gay; however, she does not believe him. When Michelle's brother Liam Connor (Rob James-Collier) hears Steve's allegation, he confronts him, with Steve sticking by what he saw. An unsure Liam questions Sean at work with Sean claiming nothing is going on. The same day, Liam and his brother Paul (Sean Gallagher) confront Sean a second time, forcing him to tell the truth. They then frogmarch Sean to the pub to tell Michelle the truth. Sean does so, with Michelle bursting into tears, shocked at what she is hearing. An oblivious Sonny arrives at Michelle's that night, ready to take her out. A crying Michelle tells Sonny she knows about him and Sean, before giving him back her engagement ring. Sonny then leaves in shame.

When Michelle's son Ryan Connor (Ben Thompson) discovers the gay affair, he steals Sonny's car and takes it for a joyride. The police find out but Sonny doesn't press charges. After Michelle discovers the affair, Sonny goes to Sean but Sean rejected him. Sonny walks out of number 11 and hasn't been seen since.

== Emma ==
Emma
- Coronation Street character
- Portrayed by: Stephanie Waring
- Duration: 2006–2007
- First appearance: 25 December 2006
- Last appearance: 20 April 2007
- Introduced by: Steve Frost
In-universe information
- Daughters: Chloe

Emma, played by Stephanie Waring, made her first appearance on 25 December 2006. She visits 11 Coronation Street with a baby girl (Amelia Caudwell), whom she claims is Jason Grimshaw's (Ryan Thomas) daughter. Emma leaves Chloe with Jason's mother Eileen Grimshaw (Sue Cleaver) and Eileen decides to keep the baby, rather than get Social Services involved. Emma does not provide the baby's name, so Eileen names her Holly. Jason initially refuses to bond with Holly, while all the other residents of No.11 rally round to support Eileen with the baby's upkeep.

A few months later, Emma returns in a confused state, revealing that she is unsure whether Jason is actually Holly's father. Emma reveals that she actually had a relationship with Charlie Stubbs (Bill Ward) – who had told her that he was called Jason Grimshaw. When she saw his picture in newspaper reports following his murder, she realised it was Charlie who was Holly's father, not Jason. Eileen is determined to keep Holly, after bonding with her, and initially refuses to give her back to Emma. She tries to convince herself and others that Emma is an unfit mother, but after a change of heart, Eileen eventually hands the baby over to Social Services.

== Holly Grimshaw ==
Holly Grimshaw
- Coronation Street character
- Portrayed by: Amelia Caudwell
- Duration: 2006–2007
- First appearance: 25 December 2006
- Last appearance: 25 April 2007
- Introduced by: Steve Frost
In-universe information
- Other names: Chloe
- Father: Charlie Stubbs
- Mother: Emma

Holly Grimshaw (real name Chloe), played by Amelia Caudwell, first appears on Christmas Day 2006 when her mother Emma (Stephanie Waring) dumps her on Jason Grimshaw (Ryan Thomas) claiming that he is her father, following a one-night stand. Jason's mother Eileen (Sue Cleaver) bonds with her new granddaughter, who they name Holly because of the day she arrived. Jason bonds with her too and enjoys being a father and a family with his fiancée Sarah Platt (Tina O'Brien) and her daughter, Bethany.

When Charlie Stubbs (Bill Ward) is murdered in January 2007, Jason is upset as Charlie was one of his closest friends. However, Tracy Barlow (Kate Ford)'s trial is in the newspaper. Holly's mother, Emma, reads about it and realises that Charlie is Holly's father, not Jason. She returns for her daughter but Eileen initially refuses to give her back. She threatens to go for legal custody but is persuaded to return her on 25 April 2007.

== Other characters ==
Character	Date(s)	Actor	Circumstances
Jo	6–12 February	Emma Pike	A woman who David Platt (Jack P. Shepherd) gets chatting to when she moves into the flat above the bookies. She then offers David a part-time job with flexible hours and good money, which he accepts. David tells his mother Gail (Helen Worth) that he is walking Jo's dog for her. Meanwhile, David tells Craig Harris (Richard Fleeshman) that dog walking is only part of his job for Jo. He shows Craig the cannabis farm which Jo has installed in her flat and pays him to look after. The police later raid Jo's flat and discover the drugs. David is arrested but is later released when he insists that he knew nothing about the drugs. Jo disappears and is never seen again.
