= Dev Alahan =

Fictional character from Coronation Street

- Coronation Street character
- Portrayed by: Jimmi Harkishin
- Duration: 1999–present
- First appearance: 10 November 1999
- Introduced by: Jane MacNaught
- Spin-off appearances: Coronation Street: Text Santa Special (2013, 2015)
- Crossover appearances: East Street (2010)
In-universe information
- Occupation: Businessman; Shopkeeper; Kebab shop owner
- Father: Ranjiv Alahan
- Mother: Urmila Alahan
- Wife: Sunita Parekh (2004–2006); Bernie Winter (2025–present)
- Sons: Aadi Alahan
- Daughters: Shareen; Amber Kalirai; Asha Alahan
- Stepsons: Kit Green; Paul Foreman
- Stepdaughters: Gemma Winter
- Uncles: Ravi Desai; Raj Desai; Sanjeet Desai; Umed Alahan
- Aunts: Aunty Rani; Gita
- First cousins: Vikram Desai; Nita Desai; Naveen Alahan

Dev Alahan is a fictional character from the British ITV soap opera Coronation Street. Portrayed by Jimmi Harkishin, the character's first appearance was broadcast on 10 November 1999. He is the ex-husband of Sunita Alahan (Shobna Gulati), husband to Bernie Winter (Jane Hazlegrove) and father to Amber Kalirai (Nikki Patel), Aadi Alahan (Zennon Ditchett/Adam Hussain) and Asha Alahan (Tanisha Gorey). It is suggested that Alahan has fathered children other than these, with one of them named Shareen. Harkishin took breaks from the role on several occasions including in 2004, 2015, 2019 and 2025.

== Development ==
=== Casting ===
In December 2004, it was announced that Harkishin had decided to take a break from Coronation Street following revelations about his private life. A spokesperson for Granada said Harkishin had been granted indefinite leave to sort out his "problems" and had their full support. A decade later, Harkishin asked for an extended break from the soap, departing on 13 February 2015 and returning on 1 June of that year. On 6 April 2019, it was announced that Harkishin would take a two-month break. In February 2025, it was announced that Harkishin would be taking another temporary break from the soap in order to go travelling for his 25th year on the soap. In the storyline, Dev goes to India to be with his family after his aunt Gita has a fall, and his partner Bernie Winter (Jane Hazlegrove) offers to go with him, although it was hinted that she may not.

=== Relationship with Sunita Alahan ===
On 12 February 2001, it was announced that Coronation Street would introduce a new Asian character named Sunita Alahan played by Shobna Gulati. Sunita was given an immediate link to established character Dev as she was an employee at his shop in Swinton. Sunita and Dev later went on to begin a relationship and eventually get married. The marriage ended in 2006 when Sunita was axed from the show.

On 16 May 2009, it was confirmed that Gulati would be returning to the programme, reprising the role of Sunita. Coronation Street producer Kim Crowther first hinted at a possible return for Sunita in an interview with entertainment website Digital Spy the previous week. She said: "We have a great new direction for Dev after Tara [Mandal]'s (Ayesha Dharker) exit. Further down the line, we build more family around Dev again and it might signal the return of some old faces…"

== Storylines ==
Dev as he appeared in 1999.

Amy Goskirk (Jayne Ashbourne), an ex-girlfriend, follows Dev to Weatherfield, claiming he had promised to marry her. He denies this, claiming she is mentally unstable so she claims to be pregnant with his baby and that she had attempted suicide. When she turns up at the Rovers Return with bandaged wrists, Dev exposes her lies by ripping off the bandages, revealing no cuts.

Some time later, Dev almost marries barmaid Geena Gregory (Jennifer James), but her mother is unhappy and pays Karen McDonald (Suranne Jones) to set him up so Geena will dump him. Although she forgives him, Geena and Dev later split up and she starts dating Joe Carter (Jonathan Wrather). Dev saves shop assistant Sunita Parekh (Shobna Gulati) from an arranged marriage, giving her a safe haven in the flat above the Corner Shop. Sunita develops feelings for Dev but he initially sees her as just a friend, but they later get involved. His other girlfriends include: cruise ship hairdresser Debs Brownlow (Gabrielle Glaister), and Tracy Preston (Kate Ford), who wrecks his flat after discovering he has no intention of marrying her. He also sleeps with Tracy's mother, Deirdre Rachid (Anne Kirkbride), who he later employs.

Dev later meets solicitor Maya Sharma (Sasha Behar), while on the rebound from Sunita, who chooses barman Ciaran McCarthy (Keith Duffy) over him. He allows Maya to move in and she makes friends with Frankie Baldwin (Debra Stephenson), but gets jealous of the amount of time Dev and Sunita are spending together and forces him to choose. As Sunita is seriously ill, he chooses her. This enrages Maya so she smashes up his flat and frames Sunita for an illegal immigration scam so she is arrested on her and Dev's wedding day. Sunita is jailed but released when one of the illegal immigrants Maya married is arrested for a completely separate offence and identifies Maya as his "wife", pleading with her for help in front of the police. Maya is charged but released on bail and wanting revenge, she ties up Sunita and sets fire to all of Dev's shops, knocking him unconscious when he tries to rescue Sunita and leaves them to die. However, Ciaran and Charlie Stubbs (Bill Ward) save them.

Dev's marriage to Sunita is happy for a while, and the couple is overjoyed to discover that Sunita is expecting twins. Dev then sells his share of Streetcars to Lloyd Mullaney (Craig Charles) in order to buy a house for his new family. However, during 2005, Sunita takes in teenage Amber Kalirai (Nikki Patel), daughter of one of his employees as her mother is in hospital. Dev is unhappy at Amber's presence and Sunita is shocked to learn that Dev is her biological father, due to a brief relationship years ago. However, Sunita then learns that Dev has other children by women he employs and grandchildren too. Sunita is devastated, especially when Dev admits having very little contact with his daughters, and leaves him. She allows him to be present when she gives birth to the twins, who are named Asha and Aadi. Dev is overjoyed (especially as Aadi is his first son), but Sunita cannot forgive him so she leaves the street with the twins, moving into the house that Dev had bought. Dev, however, is allowed to have regular contact with the twins.

The following February, Amber (who now knows that Dev is her father) moves in with Dev as her mother is moving to Finland with her new boyfriend but Amber wants to stay behind in England. At first, Dev insists that she go with her mother, bitter about the part Amber played in his marriage breaking down, but eventually he thaws and allows her to stay living with him permanently. On New Year's Eve 2007, Dev takes over from Bob as best man for Vernon Tomlin (Ian Reddington) at his wedding to Liz McDonald (Beverley Callard) and is later hit by Jim McDonald (Charles Lawson), when Jim is attacking Vernon.

In summer 2008, Dev is upset after conversations with Tony Gordon (Gray O'Brien) and Norris Cole (Malcolm Hebden) make him realise that he is just a simple man running a chain of corner shops. To compensate, he takes out membership at a new golf club to make himself feel better. Dev goes for a round of golf with Vernon and by chance, they strike up a conversation with Prem Mandal (Madhav Sharma), who gives Vernon some pointers. The trio later have a drink together at the clubhouse and after Prem leaves, Dev tells Vernon that Prem is a very successful businessman who runs his own cleaning business. Dev then has an affair with Prem's wife, Nina Mandal (Harvey Virdi), (an ex-Bollywood star whom Dev once had a crush on), after going on a date with their friend, Lisa.

Dev with Prem's wife Nina.

In August 2008, Dev buys a flat at the newly finished Victoria Court and becomes increasingly unhappy with his affair with Nina when he realises that she has been cheating on Prem for years. Nina blackmails Dev by threatening to tell Prem if he tries to end it, but Dev meets their daughter and finds himself torn between Tara (Ayesha Dharker) and Nina. Nina does not approve of Dev's attraction to Tara but they go on several dates regardless, so she threatens again to tell Prem about their affair. Dev, sick of Nina's threats, tells Prem himself, who is disgusted but Tara has taken quite a shine to him and tries to discourage her but she interprets his actions as honourable. Eventually, Dev visits Prem again and asks for his permission to date Tara asking Prem to promise that he would not tell Tara about Dev and Nina's affair for Tara's sake. Prem agrees but Tara tells Dev that Nina slept with her ex-boyfriend and insisted to Tara that she's paranoid and her boyfriend was not cheating on her.

In November 2008, he buys Jerry's Takeaway from Jerry Morton (Michael Starke) and renames it "Prima Doner". Amber is so angry when she discovers her father has taken away her boyfriend's home and livelihood that she tells Tara about Dev's affair with Nina. This causes her and Dev to briefly split up but they reconcile, with Amber's assistance. Dev's uncle, Umed Alahan (Harish Patel), arrives for a visit in March 2009 and begins helping out in the Corner Shop.

In April 2009, barmaid Poppy Morales (Sophiya Haque) sees Dev and Tara's family friend, Lisa Dalton (Ruth Alexander Rubin) together the night Tara dumps him, following an argument about her art gallery and she leaves. However, Poppy tells Tara that she saw Dev and Lisa together and Tara confronts Lisa about it, telling her not to visit them again. When she asks Dev what he did the night that she left, he says that he stayed in watching television so Tara plots revenge for his betrayal. She convinces Dev to let himself be photographed naked. On 11 May, in front of a huge crowd for an unveiling on urban degradation, Dev proposes to Tara but she rejects him before unveiling a huge photo of him naked with the word LIAR printed on it. Dev is humiliated and Tara leaves soon after but is horrified to realise how her revenge has humiliated Amber too. She apologises but Amber makes it clear that she's not interested. In October 2009, Umed returns to India.

In November 2009, Dev begins taking golf lessons to try to be better than Steve McDonald (Simon Gregson). However, Steve is doing the same. Dev begins charming his instructor, Bernie Sayers (Jennifer Hennessy), although he notices her strange behaviour around Steve and she admits that she is also teaching him. Dev and Bernie have a brief relationship, but she ends it when she realises that he really wants Sunita and his children back, after learning that she has a new partner, Matt, and that they're engaged. In January 2010, Dev is secretly pleased when Sunita tells him that she has broken up with Matt. Realising that they are meant to be together, Dev and Sunita agree to give their relationship another chance and buy 7 Coronation Street from the widowed single mother, Maria Connor.

In December 2010, after the tram crash Becky McDonald (Katherine Kelly) steals money from the Corner Shop's safe whilst Dev is in hospital after Sunita was injured. Later that month, Dev says whoever took the money will be on the CCTV footage from that night but discovers the camera was damaged; leaving the culprit unidentified.

In February 2011, he attends Peter and Leanne's wedding renewal and Owen Armstrong (Ian Puleston-Davies) visits, looking for payment, which Dev cannot afford; so Owen threatens to tear the Corner Shop apart again if he is not paid. Dev is also confronted by Sunita as she has learned that their savings account is empty. Dev admits that the Corner Shop was not insured and he has not paid the mortgage on the house either so Sunita asks to see the business accounts. She sees that all Dev's shops are in financial trouble for various reasons (e.g. roadworks and competition from other shops) so she suggests selling everything except the Kebab Shop and the Corner Shop. Dev breaks down as it took years to build up his business empire and asks Steve to loan him £5,000, but Steve can't give him anything as he owes money to Lloyd and Owen. In November, Dev and Sunita feel further financial pressure, especially with Amber's return, as she has dropped out of university. They clash over the cost of Dev's golfing when a huge bill arrives for his annual membership fee and gets worse when Dev takes Aadi to the club with Steve and, in discovering that he is very good, convinces Sunita that Aadi should have regular lessons. Sunita agrees on the condition that Dev spends the same on Amber and Asha. Sunita and Dev argue about their finances again in January 2012 when he buys Amber a car for her 21st birthday, leading Sunita (now feeling taken for granted) to have an affair with Rovers barman, Karl Munro (John Michie) and they are eventually caught together by Karl's fiancée, Stella Price (Michelle Collins), and her daughters Eva Price (Catherine Tyldesley) and Leanne Barlow (Jane Danson). Although devastated and heartbroken by Sunita's infidelity, Dev is willing to give her another chance, but she asks him to leave so he attacks Karl, trashes the shop and nearly drinks himself to death but Lloyd finds him and stops him from doing so.

In April 2013, Dev loses the love of his life after she is trapped inside the basement of the Rovers during a fire started by Karl Munro. Sunita initially survives the fire after being rescued by firefighters, but Karl removes her oxygen mask and suffocates her, so as he is not identified as the arsonist. As a result, Dev and the kids are left heartbroken with the police believing Sunita set the Rovers on fire when it was in fact, Karl who framed Sunita for the crime. In September 2013, Dev finally starts to see Karl's true colours after Karl threatens Jason Grimshaw (Ryan Thomas) while Dev is inside the house talking to Jason. The pair work together to uncover Karl's crimes. They gather more evidence as the days went on, then fifteen-year-old Craig Tinker (Colson Smith) runs away from home, which puts Dev under more suspicion and they question Craig at the Corner Shop with Jason arriving just in time. The pair force the truth out of Craig, telling them that Karl committed the crime. Now that Dev believes Craig's story of the events that Karl started the fire, Dev rushes to the altar to stop Karl from marrying Stella but it is too late as the couple is now married. Meanwhile, Jason takes Craig, Beth Tinker (Lisa George) and Kirk Sutherland (Andrew Whyment) to the police station to get Karl arrested for killing Sunita and Toni Griffiths (Tara Moran), the firefighter who was crushed in the inferno. Dev confronts Karl at his wedding reception in the Bistro, then follows him to the Rovers. After Karl finally admits to starting the fire, Dev attacks him, only for Karl to knock him unconscious by hitting him over the head with a bottle. Dev manages to text Jason while Karl holds him and Stella hostage. When Jason arrives, Karl threatens to set fire to the pub again. Jason drags Dev out while Karl takes Stella hostage in the cellar. As the police arrive, Karl realises he has to face the consequences of his actions and turns himself in to the police outside, which is witnessed by Dev, Jason and many other residents on the street.

In 2014, Dev begins to develop feelings for Stella and he decides that he is unfit. Gary Windass (Mikey North) hears Dev talking about this, and recommends his army friend Kal Nazir (Jimi Mistry), who has left the army and became a personal trainer. Initially, Dev declines the offer. However, Kal visits the Rovers and Dev later agrees to let Kal help him in his goal to get fit. Kal also begins training with Nick Tilsley (Ben Price), who is still suffering mentally after being involved in a car crash with his brother. On Dev's fiftieth birthday, he asks Stella for a drink. They both return to Dev's flat, unaware that Kal, Lloyd Mullaney (Craig Charles), Steve McDonald (Simon Gregson) and Andrea Beckett (Hayley Tamaddon) are hiding behind his sofa to surprise him. Dev tells Stella that he loves her, only for her to gently reject him, as the four behind the sofa emerge. Dev feels embarrassed.

== Reception ==
In 2021, Harkishin was longlisted for "Funniest Performance" for the Inside Soap Awards for his role as Dev. In 2025, James Hibbs from Radio Times called Dev's temporary exit storyline "sad" and noted how Dev had been a "consistent fixture" in the soap since 1999.
