= Sunita Alahan =

Fictional character from Coronation Street

- Coronation Street character
- Portrayed by: Shobna Gulati
- Duration: 2001–2006, 2009–2013
- First appearance: Episode 5007; 23 March 2001
- Last appearance: Episode 8096; 3 April 2013
- Introduced by: Jane Macnaught (2001); Kim Crowther (2009)
- Crossover appearances: East Street (2010)
In-universe information
- Occupation: Shop assistant Barmaid
- Father: Suresh Parekh
- Mother: Mena Parekh
- Brothers: Jayesh Parekh
- Husband: Dev Alahan (2004–2006)
- Sons: Aadi Alahan
- Daughters: Asha Alahan
- Stepdaughters: Amber Kalirai
- Aunts: Grishma Parekh; Upma Parekh
- Nieces: Jaya Parekh

Sunita Alahan (also Parekh) was a fictional character from the British ITV soap opera Coronation Street, played by Shobna Gulati. They made their first screen appearance on 23 March 2001 and remained in the show until 2006, when the character was axed from the serial by producer Tony Wood. In 2009, Sunita returned to Coronation Street as a full-time character, reintroduced by producer Kim Crowther. In November 2012, Gulati announced that they had quit the soap once more, this time permanently. Sunita died on 3 April 2013 as she succumbed to the injuries she sustained during the Rovers Return fire, caused by her illicit ex-lover Karl Munro (John Michie).

Sunita's storylines saw her escape an arranged marriage, diagnosed with an aneurysm and a brain tumour, falsely imprisoned, held hostage, falling pregnant with twins, becoming a single parent after divorcing her husband, surviving a tram crash, embarking on an affair with Karl, becoming trapped in a fire at The Rovers Return Inn and later dying in hospital of a cardiac arrest after her breathing tube was removed by Karl.

== Creation and development ==
=== Introduction ===
On 12 February 2001, it was announced that Coronation Street would introduce a new Asian character named Sunita Parekh as part of an arranged marriage storyline. It was revealed that former Dinnerladies actress Shobna Gulati would portray Sunita and appear in the show from March. Sunita was given an immediate link to established character Dev Alahan (Jimmi Harkishin) as she was an employee at his shop in Swinton. After the announcement of the character, the storyline caused criticism among the press for reinforcing negative racial stereotypes. A Coronation Street spokeswoman, Alison Sinclair, defended the portrayal of the new character, commenting: "The arranged marriage storyline is just a device for pulling viewers in. We researched various storylines with the Asian community and this gives us dramatically best way forward. But then we move on from that." Sinclair also said that the show had been criticised in the past for not tackling issues of concern to the characters from the minority ethnic communities portrayed. Defending the storyline, Gulati added: "It's very brave to explore an issue a lot of people consider to be untrendy but it's prevalent and part of our culture." Despite the criticism, writer Yasmin Alibhai-Brown, who has sat on a parliamentary committee investigating forced marriages in Asian communities, believed such issues should be tackled on screen. She stated: "I think these stories should be on a lot more but Coronation Street should have a whole range of characters. Most people who are running soaps are so narrow-minded, the only time they think of black characters is for stereotypical roles." She made her first on-screen appearance on 23 March 2001, although her voice only was heard on 21 March 2001.

=== Brain tumour and aneurysm ===
In 2004, Sunita was part of a storyline in which she discovers she is suffering from a brain tumour and aneurysm. The story was reported in tabloids prior to airing, with the storyline showing Sunita convincing herself she was suffering from migraines rather than getting herself checked out. Which she later found out was life-threatening.

=== Departure (2006) ===
In September 2005, the Daily Mirror reported that Sunita could be axed along with nine other cast members as part of plans to reduce cast numbers. On 20 September 2005, it was confirmed that the character had been axed, alongside Janice Battersby (Vicky Entwistle) and Jessie Jackson (Nailah Cumberbatch). Speaking of the axings, producer Tony Wood said, "Shobna and Vicky are superb actresses who have proved extremely popular during their time on the show. However it is the nature of soap that characters come and go and the writing team and I felt that these characters had run their course for the time being." Gulati said she was looking forward to a "great exit storyline" and it was confirmed that Sunita would not be killed off, leaving the door open for a possible return. Sunita departed on-screen on 1 February 2006. In April 2006, it was reported by the press that Gulati would return to the show, however it was revealed by a Coronation Street source that Sunita would only be mentioned in forthcoming scripts and would not be returning.

=== Reintroduction ===
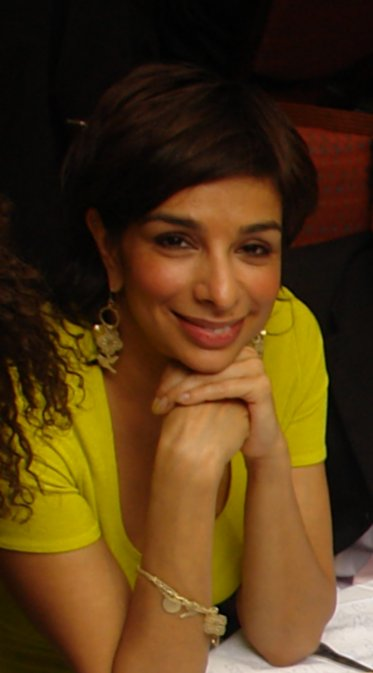
Shobna Gulati, pictured in 2007, anticipated her 2009 return as an opportunity to show a more mature side to Sunita.

In May 2009, it was reported by The Sun that Gulati would make a "dramatic return" to the show. A spokesperson told Digital Spy: "Talks have been going on, but nothing has been signed and sealed." On 16 May 2009, it was confirmed that Gulati would be reprising the role of Sunita. Discussing their comeback, Gulati commented: "They didn't kill Sunita off - she went to live in her parents' house in Swinton with her and Dev's twins. Sunita's a heartwarming character and I'd like to see her come back as a mature woman - she has brought up two kids on her own and she's not a girl anymore." Coronation Street producer Kim Crowther first hinted at a possible return for Sunita in an interview with entertainment website Digital Spy in the previous week. She said: "We have a great new direction for Dev after Tara [Mandal]'s (Ayesha Dharker) exit. Further down the line, we build more family around Dev again and it might signal the return of some old faces…" The character returned on-screen on 10 December 2009, drawing 7.79 million viewers and 34.2% of the total TV viewing audience.

=== Affair with Karl Munro ===
In January 2012, Gulati hinted that there will be changes for Sunita in the coming weeks. It was later reported that Sunita will embark on an affair with Karl Munro (John Michie) . Speaking to the Daily Star, the executive producer of the show, Phil Collinson, said that Sunita catches Karl's eye and it makes it more exciting as Sunita is the last person viewers would expect to have an affair and hinted that "all hell breaks loose" when Karl's partner Stella Price (Michelle Collins) discovers the affair. In an interview with Digital Spy, Michie said that the main reason that Karl is attracted to Sunita is that because he is a "serial flirt". Michie also said that it's great working with Gulati and is a very easy person to work with as they get on well.

Sunita is in a highly emotional state, so she comes onto Karl. It doesn't go very far before they pull away, but then Karl starts to regret the fact that it hasn't gone further! You'll see that Karl ends up feeling a bit confused, and that's really the beginning of the relationship that is coming up between him and Sunita. At the start, though, it's a case of Sunita and Karl getting their signals mixed up. Karl is thinking of Stella as well, so it's quite a strange and confusing situation.

— John Michie explains the reasons for Karl and Sunita's actions

Gulati revealed in March 2012 that a fan "warned her off Karl" while shopping in the supermarket. She said that Sunita has a soft spot for Karl and the person in the supermarket said to leave Karl as he has a gambling addiction. Gulati added: "[It's] definitely interesting viewing, definitely keep watching, because Sunita and Karl - how hot is that?" In an interview with Digital Spy, Gulati said that Sunita is starting to notice Karl because Dev is showing little or no interest in her. She also added that Sunita doesn't find Karl's gambling problems off-putting because she wants to be needed and that every girl likes a challenge as she feels she can change Karl.

=== Departure (2013) ===
On 30 November 2012, Daniel Kilkelly from Digital Spy reported that Gulati would leave Coronation Street to explore other career opportunities and spend more time on comedy writing. Gulati stated "I have loved playing Sunita but, having played the role originally from 2001 to 2005 and then returning to Corrie four years ago, I really feel the time has come for me to focus on other aspects of my career." Series producer Phil Collinson added that Gulati's departure would provide "an exciting storyline opportunity" for Sunita and the writing team were looking forward to plotting "a brilliant exit story for her." Gulati filmed their final scenes on 27 February 2013 along with fellow departing actress, Natalie Gumede, who played Kirsty Soames.

== Storylines ==
=== 2001–2006 ===
Sunita calls her boss Dev Alahan (Jimmi Harkishin), asking for help as she does not want to marry the man that her parents have arranged for her. She comes to Weatherfield on 23 March 2001 and tells Dev that she does not want to get married and Dev lets her stay in the corner shop flat. Her parents, Mena (Leena Dhingra) and Suresh (Kaleem Janjua) dismiss her fears as pre-wedding nerves and warn her if she doesn't marry Deepak, they will disown her. Sunita refuses to change her mind, starting work in the shop and residency in the flat above.

Sunita later leaves the shop and gets a job working at The Rovers Return Inn public house as a barmaid. She begins dating Ciaran McCarthy (Keith Duffy), causing problems between her and her friend, Shelley Unwin (Sally Lindsay), as he tried to wreck her relationship with his friend, Peter Barlow (Chris Gascoyne) but Ciaran is arrested for being absent without leave as he is still serving in the Navy. He is away for a while and Sunita starts developing feelings for Dev but Ciaran returns and they reconcile. Ciaran proposes and she accepts but he changes his mind about getting married and can't tell her so Tracy Barlow (Kate Ford) does it for him. Sunita then confronts him before ending their relationship. She briefly dates Danny Baldwin (Bradley Walsh) but ends it after discovering he is married.

Sunita later collapses and is diagnosed with an aneurysm and a brain tumour. Dev looks after Sunita, insisting that she get medical attention and going with her to her appointments. She is told that she will need an operation to repair the aneurysm but Dev's partner, Maya Sharma (Sasha Behar), who is friends with Danny's wife, Frankie Baldwin (Debra Stephenson), becomes suspicious. She sneaks into Sunita's flat and finds a pregnancy test. She assuming that it's positive until Dev tells her what is really wrong but Sunita's condition makes Dev realise that he is in love with her. He ends the relationship with Maya and tells Sunita after her operation. They decide to get married and they begin planning the wedding but Maya steals Sunita's birth certificate and as Sunita, marries 7 illegal immigrants and alerts the authorities. Sunita is arrested for bigamy on her wedding day but Dev clears Sunita's name, implicating Maya in her place. Sunita is released and Maya is arrested but released on bail. Angry that her scheme failed, Maya sets fire to Dev's shops around Manchester before taking Sunita hostage and tying her up and gagging her then capturing Dev. She sets fire to the corner shop. Sunita and Dev are rescued by Ciaran and Charlie Stubbs (Bill Ward). When Maya realises they have escaped, she tries to run them over but crashes and a truck crashes into her. She is taken to hospital in critical condition under police guard and later imprisoned.

In 2005, Sunita is overjoyed when she discovers she is expecting twins. Sunita gives birth to twins Aadi (Adam Hussain) and Asha (Tanisha Gorey), with Dev at her side. However, she later learns that Dev has children by several different women who he has given homes and jobs. She is devastated and leaves Dev after deciding she can no longer trust him. Off-screen Sunita divorces Dev, but they keep in regular contact.

=== 2009–2013 ===
When Dev sees a fellow member of his golfing club, Matt Davis (Christopher Colquhoun), with his children in December 2009, Matt tells him that he and Sunita are engaged. Infuriated, Dev visits Sunita, who apologises for not telling him sooner and reassures him that Matt does not want to take over as father figure. Dev is not convinced and confronts Matt, accusing him of doing so and implying that Matt might be a paedophile. Sunita then angrily throws Dev out, threatening to refuse him access to the children if he continues to cause trouble. In January 2010, Dev has a party for the twins for their fourth birthday at his flat in Victoria Court and Sunita is pleased by how natural with them but Matt is worried that Sunita still has feelings for Dev. Matt and Sunita's relationship ends as Dev and Sunita become closer, after pretending to still be married to impress Sunita's aunts, Grishma (Indira Joshi) and Upma (Jamila Massey), and reconcile. Sunita starts working with Dev in the Corner Shop again and in May 2010, Sunita convinces Dev to sell the flat and buy No. 7 from Maria Connor (Samia Smith). Dev agrees and Maria accepts their offer.

In August, Sunita is horrified to find Aadi unconscious on the sofa and calls an ambulance. At the hospital, they learn that he has a head injury, that caused bleeding on the brain. Sunita and Dev believe Claire Peacock (Julia Haworth) is responsible as she is their childminder, causing an argument with the Peacocks, but are shocked to learn that Simon Barlow (Alex Bain) is responsible. Aadi was injured when Simon accidentally pushed him off the sofa. Sunita feels guilty and tries to apologise to Claire but blames Claire's mental health history — as she suffered post-natal depression following the birth of her son, Freddie (Niall and Luke Beresford) - angering Claire further, and she and her husband Ashley (Steven Arnold) refuse to accept Sunita's apology.

In December 2010, a gas explosion at the Joinery wine bar causes a tram to derail and crash into the Corner Shop. Sunita is buried under the rubble, but later makes a full recovery. She is shocked to learn that Dev has used their savings to pay for the shop refit as it had not been insured and they face financial ruin as the shop had been looted on the night of the tram crash. Dev's other shops are also struggling, making Steve McDonald (Simon Gregson), feel guilty and he secretly returns the money his wife Becky McDonald (Katherine Kelly) stole. Dev wants to tell the police but Sunita refuses, insisting they pay Owen Armstrong (Ian Puleston-Davies) for the re-fit, rather than give the money to the police as evidence while they investigate. Dev and Sunita realise the money was stolen by someone they knew. Knowing that the Alahans are getting suspicious and wanting to protect Becky, Steve tells them that he stole the money. However, Becky refuses to let Steve take the blame and tells Dev and Sunita that she took the money and Sunita threatens to call the police and throws her out of the corner shop. When Sunita and Dev realise that Becky had stolen the money to give to her sister, Kylie Platt (Paula Lane), so she would be able to keep custody of her nephew, Max Turner (Harry McDermott), Sunita decides not to call the police much to Dev's disappointment.

Grishma and Upma, Sunita's aunts, return to visit her. They are shocked at how things had changed since their previous visit and are not impressed with Sunita's home and lifestyle and on learning that she and Dev are divorced and were pretending to be together before, so they start searching for a more suitable husband. They try to set her up with Nick Tilsley (Ben Price) and Dr. Matt Carter (Oliver Mellor). This prompts Dev to propose to Sunita in the Rovers, but she turns him down. Later that night, Sunita insists that she and Dev are fine as they are and that the proposal was just a way of proving a point to her aunts. When Dev's daughter, Amber Kalirai (Nikki Patel) moves in after dropping out of university, Sunita struggles to feel sympathy and the two women have a difficult relationship. Sunita soon starts to worry about their finances after Dev renews his membership at the Golf Club, despite the expense, and starts paying for Aadi to have golf lessons after he shows talent. Sunita is also angered by Amber starting a brief affair with Sophie Webster (Brooke Vincent), despite Sophie's relationship with Sian Powers (Sacha Parkinson). Sophie confides in Sunita who angrily warns Amber to leave Sophie alone but the damage is done and Sian jilts Sophie on their wedding day and leaves her. Sunita starts feeling that Dev takes her for granted whilst rewarding Amber for her bad behaviour. Wanting Dev to take her seriously, she gets her old job back at The Rovers when Stella Price (Michelle Collins), sympathises with her problems, particularly after she sees Dev's reaction to Sunita's news.

After Amber throws a party at No. 7, Sunita is angry as the twins had been upstairs. She shouts at Amber and refuses to apologise when Dev asks her to. Amber leaves the same day. Dev blames Sunita for this and she goes on a night out with Stella. Sunita gets drunk, climbs onto the roof of a parked car and is arrested for being drunk and disorderly. Stella's partner Karl Munro (John Michie) collects her from the police station and is sympathetic to her plight. Sunita kisses him but the following day they agree not to take things further. She later learns that Karl has a gambling problem when he fakes a robbery at the Rovers to pay off his debts and Stella throws him out. Sunita puts Karl up while Dev and the twins are on holiday and keeps his winnings from a roulette game, hoping to help wean him off his addiction. Stella and Karl later reconcile but she refuses to allow him near any cash. Feeling undermined by Stella and touched by Sunita's kindness, Karl and Sunita embark on a clandestine affair.

Karl feels guilty about cheating on Stella and ends the affair. Sunita is angered, feeling that Karl was using her and lures him into a honey-trap when he covers for Stella when she and her daughters, Leanne Barlow (Jane Danson) and Eva Price (Catherine Tyldesley) go out for the night together, trying to reconcile Eva and Leanne who have been arguing. Sunita stays to help Karl close up the pub and sees a text message from Stella to Karl on his phone, saying that she is on her way home. Sunita deletes the message and seduces him. Karl is horrified when Stella, Eva and Leanne find them together, semi-dressed, and throws them both out before telling Dev about the affair. Dev is willing to give Sunita another chance but she refuses, choosing to be with Karl and he moves into No. 7 while Dev moves into the flat above the shop. Sunita tries to make her relationship with Karl work but he resents Sunita having other priorities and he soon loses interest in her. After he gets drunk at the twins' seventh birthday party, Dev warns Sunita that Karl is making a fool of her and Stella tells Karl about the text Sunita deleted and he realises that Sunita did it to trap him. Karl angrily confronts Sunita and storms off, going on a drunken binge. Sunita changes the locks and tells Karl, when he returns, that their relationship is over, throwing his possessions out into the street.

In the following weeks, Dev and Sunita begin to grow closer again. Dev agrees to give their relationship another go, much to Sunita's delight. However, when they announce this, Stella reminds Dev of the pain that Sunita caused him and urges him not to rekindle their relationship. Dev, realising that Sunita doesn't love him, tells her that they are finished. Sunita gets drunk and angrily confronts Stella in the Bistro. Later, whilst drinking in her back yard, Sunita sees Karl running down the ginnel and follows him into the cellar of The Rovers, where she finds him setting fire to Jason Grimshaw's (Ryan Thomas) building materials, trying to make it look like an accident in order to frame Jason. She attempts to confront him, and a struggle breaks out. Sunita is knocked unconscious and Karl leaves her as the fire takes hold. Sunita is rescued and rushed to hospital, where she is placed on a life support machine. Karl frames Sunita for the fire by placing the pub's spare set of keys with Sunita's belongings and pressing the keys against her fingers while she is unconscious in order for her fingerprints to be found in the investigation. When Dev learns that Sunita is starting to show signs of regaining consciousness, he tells Stella and Karl before visiting Sunita. Karl returns to the hospital and pulls out her oxygen tube. Sunita suffers a cardiac arrest and dies. Sunita is cremated in a traditional Hindu funeral on 12 April 2013. In September 2013, Karl is arrested for The Rovers fire and Sunita's death, and Sunita's name is subsequently cleared from the investigation.
