= Tara Moran =

British actress

- Born: Kathleen Tara Moran; 1 June 1971 (age 54); Leeds, West Riding of Yorkshire, England, UK
- Occupation: Actor

Kathleen Tara Moran (born 1 June 1971 in Leeds, West Riding of Yorkshire) is an actress.

Moran's television debut was in Yorkshire Television's educational history series for schools, How We Used to Live. During the mid-1980s she played Alice Selby in Series 5 (covering 1902–1926) and Susan Brady in Series 6 (1954–1970).

She has appeared as Chelsea Richards in ITV's soap opera Families; as Mary Skillet in Casualty; Felicity Barnes in EastEnders; Helen in Take Me; Anne Moore in A Touch of Frost; Katrina Webb in a 2005 episode of Shameless and Christine Carter in Coronation Street.

During 2006–2007 Moran played the recurring guest role of Shelly Fitzgerald in ITV's police drama series The Bill, in which her character was eventually discovered to be the abductor of missing child Amy Tennant.
