= Jimmi Harkishin =

British actor (born 1959)

- Born: Rajan Harkishindas; 19 March 1959 (age 67); Paris, France
- Occupation: Actor
- Years active: 1986–present
- Known for: Role of Dev Alahan in Coronation Street
- Television: Uncle Jack (1990–1993); Medics (1990, 1992–1995); Coronation Street (1999–)
- Children: 3

James "Jimmi" Harkishin (born 19 March 1959) is a British actor best known for his role as shopkeeper Dev Alahan in Coronation Street, which he has played continuously since 10 November 1999. He also played Ranjit in the film Bhaji on the Beach (1993) and Iyaaz Ali Khan in East is East (1999). Harkishin played Gary Lobo in the Jonathan Creek episode "Danse Macabre".

Harkishin was born in Paris, France to an Indian father (Deepak) and Italian mother (Soni). He has three children, Holli Harkishin, Rajan Harkishin and India Rose Harkishin with partner Susan Beaton.

He began acting in 1986 under the stage name James Harkishin, and played the regular characters of Jose Cuervo for 18 episodes between 1990–93 in the children's TV series Uncle Jack. He also played Dr. Jay Rahman in the medical drama TV series Medics, appearing for 34 episodes between 1992–95.

== Filmography ==
=== Television ===
Year	Title	Role	Notes
1987	A Killing on the Exchange	Krishna	2 episodes
1988–1990	South of the Border	Krish	Regular role, 10 episodes
1989	Shalom Salaam	Rashid Sattar	5 episodes
1989	Saracen	Hazzom	Episode: "Reaper"
1990	Eurocops	Vip	Episode: "Pushed"
1990	TECX	Karim Dhillon	Episode: "A Soldier's Death"
1990–1993	Uncle Jack	Jose Cuervo	Regular role, 18 episodes
1990, 1992–1995	Medics	Vijesh, Dr. Jay Rahman	Regular role, 35 episodes
1992	Casualty	Greg	Episode: "Rates of Exchange"
1992	Crime Story	Arthur Hosein	Episode: "Gone Too Far: The Mystery of Mrs. Muriel McKay"
1992	Desmond's	Derrick	Episode: "The Godmother"
1993	The Bill	Kumar	Episode: "The Knowledge"
1993	Fighting for Gemma	Richard Meeran	Television film
1993	Harry	Sami	Episode #1.9
1997	Holding the Baby	Doctor	Episode #1.2
1998	Jonathan Creek	Gary Lobo	Episode: "Danse Macabre"
1998	Heat of the Sun	Amir Ali	Episode: "Private Lives"
1998	Close Relations	Ravi	Unknown episodes
1999–present	Coronation Street	Dev Alahan	Regular role
2005	Coronation Street: Pantomime	Dev Alahan	Television film
2010	East Street	Dev Alahan	Charity crossover between Coronation Street and EastEnders

=== Film ===
Year	Film	Role	Notes
1988	For Queen & Country	Sadiq	
1993	Bhaji on the Beach	Ranjit	
1995	Paparazzo	Spike	
1999	East is East	Iyaaz Ali Khan	

== Awards and nominations ==
Year	Award	Category	Result	Ref.
2002	The British Soap Awards	Sexiest Male	Nominated	
2002	TV Quick Awards	Best Soap Actor	Nominated	
2013	The British Soap Awards	Best Actor	Nominated	
2022	Inside Soap Awards	Best Comic Performance	Nominated	
2022	Asian Media Awards	Best TV Character	Nominated	
