= Tommy Duckworth =

Fictional character from Coronation Street

- Coronation Street character
- Chris Fountain as Tommy Duckworth (2011)
- Portrayed by: Darryl Edwards (1992–1997); Joseph Aston (2000); Chris Fountain (2011–2013)
- Duration: 1992–1997, 2000, 2011–2013
- First appearance: Episode 3435; 9 September 1992
- Last appearance: Episode 8232; 13 October 2013
- Introduced by: Carolyn Reynolds (1992); Sue Pritchard (1994); Brian Park (1996); Jane MacNaught (2000); Phil Collinson (2011)
In-universe information
- Occupation: Mechanic; Security guard Delivery man
- Father: Terry Duckworth
- Mother: Lisa Duckworth
- Half-brothers: Paul Clayton; Brad Armstrong
- Grandfathers: Jack Duckworth; Jeff Horton
- Grandmothers: Vera Duckworth; Doreen Horton
- Other relatives: Harry Duckworth; Maggie Duckworth; Joss Shackelton; Amy Burton; Clifford Duckworth

Tommy Duckworth (also Tom Duckworth) is a fictional character from the British ITV soap opera Coronation Street, played by Darryl Edwards from 1992 to 1997, Joseph Aston in 2000, and Chris Fountain from 2011 to 2013. The character first appeared on screen during the episode airing on September 9, 1992 and departed in December 1993, before returning for five short stints in 1994, 1995, 1996, 1997, and 2000. The character returned on a more permanent basis on the 28th of March 2011. Tommy is the son of Terry (Nigel Pivaro) and Lisa Duckworth (Caroline Milmoe). Since his first appearance in 1992, he had few storylines, but after his return in 2011, he started gaining more screentime as a character.

In August 2013, producers discovered that Fountain had appeared in numerous videos on YouTube as his alter-ego "The Phantom", rapping about raping a girl and committing acts of extreme violence. He was later fired by ITV bosses. He made his final appearance on 13 October 2013, with the character getting an off-screen exit on 23 October 2013.

== Development ==
=== Early development ===
Tommy was played by Darryl Edwards as an infant and young child from 1992 to 1997. When the character briefly returned in 2000 he was played by child actor Joseph Aston. Aston's brother Sam Aston would later appear in the program as Chesney Brown.

=== Reintroduction and recast (2011) ===
On 26 November 2010, it was announced that former Hollyoaks actor Chris Fountain would be taking over the role of Tommy. Speaking of his casting, Fountain said, "I'm delighted to be joining Coronation Street, especially as I'm playing a Duckworth. I'm looking forward to upholding one of the most celebrated names in soap. I can't wait to start filming in the New Year." Speaking of the casting, producer Phil Collinson said, "I have long admired Chris, right back to his first appearance on our screens as a young boy in Red Production Company's Bob and Rose. He has the perfect balance of looks and charm and will, I am sure, create a brilliant successor to Jack. The ladies of Weatherfield had better watch out!" When asked when the role came about, Fountain said: "I think it was around September last year, when I had a call from my agent saying that she'd spoken to Coronation Street's producer Phil Collinson and that he was interested in seeing me about a part. I didn't hear anything else for a couple of months after that and I was also up for a few other parts. My agent later spoke to Phil again and he was asking what I was up to, so she told him about the roles that I was up for and how I was quite close to getting them. Phil told her that he definitely wanted to see me over this part and that he'd get me up to the set straight away."

Speaking of how Tommy was described to him Fountain said: "They described him as a cheeky chappy with a bit of swagger about him and also an eye for the ladies—and that for me was a selling point, really! I didn't get a full character breakdown until a couple of days before I started, so I learned later that he'd been busy travelling around the world and he's a bit of a free spirit. He's one of those loveable characters who can say something that's out of order but people still like him, just because he's Tommy. He's got a kind of charisma that borders on arrogance but doesn't quite cross over to that - he's quite a charming guy."

Asked whether he watched any of Tommy's previous scenes, Fountain said: "I didn't, but it's funny because I actually know Joseph Aston, who played Tommy when he was younger—that was quite strange, it's a small world! But I don't think Tommy was that much of a character when he was younger, and he definitely didn't have any of the traits or personality that he has now—he's grown up in Blackpool, been away travelling, evolved as a person and evolved as a character. So I don't think it would have really been beneficial for me to look back, but I did look into some of the history with him and his dad and what happened there."

Speaking to The Mirror, Fountain said: "To come in as a Duckworth, one of the most recognised and celebrated names in soap, was quite daunting. Jack and Vera's are big shoes to fill and I'm just hoping I can prove to people that Tommy has that Duckworth charm and wit and gain viewers' respect." Discussing the spray tan that he has to wear for the role, Fountain confessed that he is not a fan of the beauty application. "I don't like them much," he said. "My toes look like someone's been rubbing Marmite on them at the moment—it's not the greatest look!"

Speaking of whether or not he would like Terry (Duckworth) to return, Fountain said: "Yeah, if Terry came back, I think it would cause fireworks between a lot of the characters. It would be nice to see how that would pan out, because obviously Tommy is completely different to Terry—he hasn't got so much of a temper and I don't think he's a nasty person. It would definitely be quite interesting to see what happened if Terry came back."

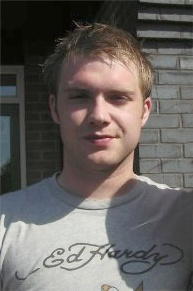
Chris Fountain (pictured) was sacked by producers, due to referencing rape, in online rap videos.

=== Departure (2013) ===
In August 2013, show producers discovered that Fountain had posted a number inappropriate and foul-mouthed rap videos online through YouTube, using the alias "The Phantom", which included references about rape. Fountain was suspended by the show with immediate effect, and a meeting was held with Fountain and the producers to discuss his unlikely future, in which he was informed that his contract had been terminated. Fountain subsequently spoke out about his sacking, stating that he was "deeply sorry" and "mortified" for his colleagues and employers, and apologised for the embarrassment he had caused.

Fountain made his final ever appearance as Tommy on 13 October 2013, before his character received an off-screen departure ten days afterwards, with Tommy leaving for a new life in the Canary Islands, after his on-screen girlfriend Tina McIntyre (Michelle Keegan) moved in her ex-boyfriend David Platt (portrayed by Jack P. Shepherd) into their flat. Fountain was then out of work for three years after his sacking, though returned to television screens in 2016.

== Storylines ==
=== 1992–2000 ===
Tommy is born on 9 September 1992 while his father, Terry, serves in Strange ways Prison for GBH. After briefly living at 9 Coronation Street with Terry and his mother, Lisa, they decide to move to her parents' house in Blackpool. Lisa and Tommy return to the Street in January 1993 to live with her lover, Des Barnes (Philip Middle miss). Lisa is then run over and killed by a car outside The Rovers Return on 12 February 1993.

Terry's parents, Jack (Bill Tarmey) and Vera Duckworth (Liz Dawn), take in their grandson. They love having him around but find it both physically and financially a struggle, as Vera gave up her job to look after the baby. At one point, she starts stealing from Bettabuy just to put food on the table, but looks forward to Terry's release and imagines them rebuilding their relationship as one big family. However, Terry has no intention of being a father and promptly hands Tommy over to Lisa's parents, who also want to raise their grandson, knowing that they would pay him a fixed sum every year in return for custody. Terry hands him over on Christmas Eve and is ready to make a quick departure. However, Lisa's father, Jeff Horton (Dicken Ashworth), forces Terry to tell Jack and Vera what he has done, not wanting to be arrested for kidnapping. Terry tells his parents, who are horrified, and Jack does not believe that Terry did it to help his parents. Jack disowns Terry and punches him before he and Jeff leave with Tommy, leaving the Duckworths (especially Vera) heartbroken. The Hortons immediately go on an extended holiday, and the Duckworths struggle to accept that Tommy will not be coming back. However, their financial burden is lifted, and Vera is able to return to work. After Jack and Vera re-establish contact with the Hortons. Tommy saw his grandparents on a semi-regular basis for most of his young life.

In June 1996, Terry returns to the Street with Tommy. The Hortons failed to pay the £2,000 a year they had agreed to pay Terry for Tommy. Eventually the Hortons retrieved him by paying £10,000 and getting Terry to sign a document giving them full custody of Tommy. Upset that Terry had sold his son again, Vera tore up all her photos of him and excluded him from her will, while Jack, after punching Terry, completely disowned his son's existence.

=== 2011–2013 ===
Tommy returns to the street on 28 March 2011, having been travelling after disagreements with the Hortons and is unaware of Jack's recent death. He became good friends with Tyrone Dobbs (Alan Halsall), who agreed to take him in as a lodger and gives him a job at the garage. Tommy soon establishes himself as a ladies' man, flirting with Sophie Webster (Brooke Vincent), Sian Powers (Sacha Parkinson) and Tina McIntyre (Michelle Keegan). He later has a row with Kevin Webster (Michael Le Vella) over flirting with Sophie and again tries to flirt with Sian, things end badly however, Sophie confronts Tommy about trying to steal her girlfriend.

In April 2011, Tommy, Jason Grimshaw (Ryan Thomas) and Tyrone agree to a bet that he could have a fling with Sian, so he offers to teach her to drive and tries to kiss her but she refuses and gets out of the car, she returns home and tells Sophie. The next day, Sophie goes over to Tommy and demands to know why he tried to kiss Sian when he knew she was a lesbian, he tells her he made a bet with Jason. Sophie's sister, Rosie Webster (Helen Flanagan), hears this and demands answers from Jason, who tries to tell her it was a bet but she dumps him. Rosie, attempting to show Tommy's true colors, she seduces him and tells him to undress and wait for her in the meantime she calls Jason who arrived and caught Tommy in his boxer shorts following this Tommy is forced to roam the streets in his underwear despite this he and Jason remain friends. Eventually, following Rosie and Jason's reconciliation, Tommy gets back in the Websters' good books when he rescues Kevin from an accident at the garage in which he is crushed underneath a car (Tyrone had damaged the car ramp that Kevin was using at the time).

Tommy meets Amber Kalirai (Nikki Patel) in July 2011 and begins to flirt with her, but after catching him making his move on Tina, she dumps him, while he denies that they were even together. When Matt Carter (Oliver Mellor) began dating Tina in August 2011, a jealous Tommy began trying to split them up to no avail. When Tina dumps Matt after coming to the conclusion that he is embarrassed by her job as a barmaid. Tina and Tommy grow closer. In February 2012, Stella Price (Michelle Collins) begins to notice how Tommy acts around Tina, so Stella tells Tina how Tommy feels about her, but neither of them wants to discuss their feelings. Tommy then thinks that Tina only wants to be friends, and Tina sees him flirting with a female customer at the garage. As Tina goes to discuss their feelings with Tommy and possibly start to date each other, Tommy kisses the woman, and Tina sees them kiss. Tommy says hello, but Tina is broken-hearted.

In April 2012, Tommy learns that Jeff has died and initially refuses to go to the funeral, but after Tyrone persuades him to admit that he feels ashamed because he did not really talk to his grandfather. Between them, Tyrone and Tina persuade Tommy to attend the funeral, and he does. That night, Tommy realises that he is in love with Tina and vice versa. They both find each other in the street where they admit their feelings for each other and go home together. Later, Tina says that she has no regrets, but Tommy regrets that it took them so long to get together. Tina says her dad would have liked Tommy, and Tommy says the same but about his grandfather. Tommy suggests that they go travelling together using the money from his grandfather that he left him in his will, but Tina lets him down gently, saying that she does not want him wasting his money on her.

Tommy's father, Terry, returns to the street briefly, but their reunion was not pleasant—Terry punched Tommy and neither recognised the other. Tyrone had to tell Tommy that his dad had just punched him. They reconciled and Terry, unlike Tina, is quite happy to take Tommy's money and persuades him to invest in a new lapdancing club that he is starting up, but admits that he owes him money to the loan sharks and Tommy offers to clear those debts but only gets caught in a whole new web of dilemmas. In order to pay his debts, Tommy takes on extra jobs, but he is so tired that he crashes his van and breaks his ankle. Unfortunately, as he was not working at the time he was driving the van, he had to pay the pizza company for the van as it was written off, landing him and Tina in more debt.

Worried about how they were going to pay their debts off, Tina took a second job doing Owen Armstrong's (Ian Puleston-Davies) accounts and when she learnt that his daughter Izzy Armstrong (Cherylee Houston) and her partner Gary Windass (Mikey North) were looking for a surrogate. She told Owen she'd be interested if the price was right. Owen offered Tina £15,000, and Tina agreed, upsetting Tommy and Rita Sullivan (Barbara Knox). Rita told Tommy that Tina would need their help and support, but Tommy could not offer her that after people learned that Tina was pregnant and assumed he was the father until he told everyone in the Rovers that Gary and Izzy are the biological parents. Tina begins to feel suffocated by the Windass family as her pregnancy progresses and is shocked when Gary tries to kiss her. Outraged by this, she threatens to tell Izzy. Izzy's sister, Katy Armstrong (Georgia May Foote), finds out and lets slip the truth to Izzy, who confronts Gary after finding him with Tina. Tina tells Izzy what happened but goes into labour soon afterwards. Tina is rushed to hospital and gives birth to a baby boy with Tommy and Izzy present. Disgusted with Izzy's refusal to allow Gary to see the baby, Tina allows Gary to see his son, causing Gary and Izzy to argue in the special care baby unit. Tina reprimands them for their behaviour and throws them out. They reconcile and decide to name the baby Jake (Harley and Layton Phoenix).

Tina starts to have doubts about giving him to Izzy and Gary. When the baby is strong enough to come out of the incubator, Izzy and Gary are shocked to find Tina holding him, and Gary suggests Izzy should be left to bond with him. Tina then tells them that she has decided to keep the baby. Izzy and Gary are outraged, and Tina promises to repay the surrogacy money, leading to another row, and Tina stops them from visiting the baby. They learn that they cannot force Tina to sign the adoption papers. Tina moves in with Rita. Anna Windass (Debbie Rush), Gary and Izzy are further angered when Tina changes the baby's name to Joe after her father. After Gary tells Anna that there is nothing they can do to stop Tina, Anna storms into the pub and slaps her in front of customers. Tina asks Tommy, Rita and Dennis Tanner (Philip Lowrie) if she is doing the right thing. Tommy tells Tina that he will support her regardless, but she must think about how Jake will feel when he is older. Izzy and Gary reluctantly decide not to fight Tina and let her raise Jake as her child. However, after she witnesses Izzy say goodbye to the baby, Tina changes her mind and decides to give the baby back to Gary and Izzy, and they change his name back to Jake. Tina is devastated by this, but Gary and Izzy let her continue to be part of Jake's life.

In October 2013, Tommy leaves the street after discovering that Tina moved David Platt (Jack P. Shepherd) into their flat. David then tells Tina about what happened, and that Tommy has left for the airport Tina tells Tyrone about Tommy leaving who is very annoyed considering that he is the only one working at the garage now. Tommy contacts Tyrone and tells him not to tell Tina where he is. Eventually, Tyrone tells her that Tommy has settled in the Canary Islands. Tina keeps messaging and emailing Tommy wanting him back after David continues to annoy her. Tommy rings Tina, telling her that he's not coming back and that she always puts other people first, upsetting Tina

== Reception ==
Chris Fountain was nominated at British Soap Awards 2011 for Sexiest Male speaking of the nomination Fountain said: "I'm absolutely thrilled to bits—I've not even been on screen yet, so it's quite flattering to be up for Sexiest Male. It's great. A few people have asked me whether it would be quite an embarrassing award to win, but considering I haven't even been on screen yet, I'd take anything! (laughs) If it was Best Haircut, I'd take that as well!" In 2014, Matt Bramford from What to Watch put Tommy on his list of the 18 best recastings in British and Australian soap operas, writing, "Apple of Vera and Jack's eye, this one. Tiny Tommy Duckworth was played by Joseph Aston for a short spell before Chris Fountain soap-hopped from Hollyoaks".
