= Anna Windass =

Fictional character from Coronation Street

- Coronation Street character
- Portrayed by: Debbie Rush
- Duration: 2008–2018
- First appearance: Episode 6947; 14 November 2008
- Last appearance: Episode 9471; 1 June 2018
- Introduced by: Kim Crowther (2008); Kate Oates (2018)
- Spin-off appearances: Tram Crash News Flash (2010)
In-universe information
- Occupation: Café waitress Cleaner
- Half-brothers: Harry
- Sons: Gary Windass
- Adoptive daughters: Faye Windass
- Grandsons: Jake Windass; Zack Rubinstein
- Granddaughters: Miley Hodge (adoptive)
- Aunts: Maureen
- Nephews: Rory

Anna Windass is a fictional character from the ITV soap opera Coronation Street, portrayed by Debbie Rush. The character was introduced in the episode first broadcast on 14 November 2008. Rush announced her decision to leave the series in July 2017 and Anna departed in the episode first broadcast on 22 January 2018. She appeared in two further episodes first broadcast on 31 May to 1 June 2018.

Anna's many storylines have included a rocky relationship to her long-term partner Eddie Windass (Steve Huison); coping with their wayward son Gary's (Mikey North) decision to enroll into the army; getting embroiled in conflicts with the Platt family and Sally Webster (Sally Dynevor); embarking on a turbulent relationship with Owen Armstrong (Ian Puleston-Davies) after her break-up with Eddie; adopting Faye Butler (Ellie Leach), who later alleges that Anna is abusing her; forming a close friendship with Faye's biological father Tim Metcalfe (Joe Duttine); coping with Faye's underage pregnancy; a romantic relationship with Kevin Webster (Michael Le Vell) following Owen's departure; and getting severely burnt in a car explosion unwittingly caused by Gary's old rival David Platt (Jack P. Shepherd).

During this time, Anna suffered years of torment at the hands of her sworn archenemy Pat Phelan in what is her biggest story arc to date. Anna's ordeal with Phelan included getting sexually harassed by him, being raped after he blackmailed her into sleeping with him, facing bankruptcy as a result of his revenge campaign against her family, being publicly humiliated by Phelan on several occasions, and later getting wrongfully jailed when Phelan framed her for pushing his protege and Faye's boyfriend Seb Franklin (Harry Visinoni) off a ladder. She was found guilty and sentenced to prison for five years, leading to her first departure in the show. However, the character was soon released off-screen after Phelan's crimes were finally exposed and eventually Anna returned for her two final episodes; the first on 31 May 2018 where she rescues Gary and his girlfriend Sarah Platt (Tina O'Brien) from Phelan's captivity, and the second on 1 June 2018 where she ultimately kills Phelan by stabbing him after he shot his daughter Nicola Rubinstein (Nicola Thorp) and local resident Michelle Connor (Kym Marsh) in the climax of his reign of terror scenario.

== Creation ==
The character of Anna was created as part of a new family unit that new producer Kim Crowther was introducing to the soap opera, consisting of a mother, father, son and uncle. They were originally billed as a storyline device for established character David Platt. An ITV spokesperson said of the character and her onscreen family: "The Windass family are very rough and ready, always ducking and diving. Early on they get involved with David Platt when he helps to fit a new kitchen in the Windass family home. However, Anna thinks the work is shoddy and refuses to pay for it. David goes round, rips out the kitchen and sets fire to it outside the family's house." Rush said of their entrance and choice of surname for the family: "The Windasses are a very close family, who are just about on the wrong side of the law, but they mean well. And yes, I am prepared for some of the things people might shout at me in the street because of the name!" The character was originally called Donna Windass but was changed last minute to Anna Windass after a series of name changes to all the members of the family since their inception, but before appearing onscreen.

Auditions were held for the part of Anna, with actress Debbie Rush going on to get the part over a number of highly-rated actors. Of this Rush said: "I went for the casting a few months ago and then was called back for the screen test. When I got the part I couldn't believe it, I was thrilled to bits. I watched Corrie all the time growing up and all the family are tuning in now that I'm going to be in it. It's surreal, because the cast and characters are already part of your life just from watching it."

== Development ==
The character of Anna has been seen to differ from the rest of her family in terms of personality traits that are not present in the others. This is because she does not approve of the continuous line of scams her husband pulls, as well as the life of crime Len and Gary indulge in. Anna is often described as the only nice Windass.

=== Departure and return ===
On 3 July 2017, it was announced that Rush had opted to leave the serial to pursue other roles, following nine years in the role. The actress will finish filming in late 2017, with Anna departing in January 2018. Rush explained that the decision to leave was "not made lightly", but she is looking forward to pursuing other roles. She added, "I love playing Anna and will miss working with the fantastic cast and crew." Kate Oates, the show's series producer, promised that writers are creating an "exciting" departure plot for Anna, which sees her "fighting for her family and tackling old enemies head-on." Oates commented, "It's always sad when a huge talent like Debbie Rush decides to move to pastures new." Additionally, a show spokesperson confirmed "plenty more drama" for the character before her departure and wished Rush "every success for the future". Rush's exit aired on 22 January 2018.

On 31 May 2018, Anna returned to the series as part of Phelan's exiting storyline. Her return had not been announced beforehand and was a surprise for the audience. She appeared in the episodes first broadcast on 31 May and 1 June 2018. Rush was glad that Anna's story did not end with her last departure as she felt they could not leave Anna imprisoned. On her reasons for leaving, Rush explained, "I didn't leave because I hated it, I left for a few different reasons and I loved going back." Rush had already agreed to reprise her role for the episodes when she left and had to decline other acting opportunities for the return. The actress liked returning for the episodes. After her departure, she continued to tweet about the show, which attracted the attention of her followers. Rush filmed her scenes over five days and when she entered the studios in her car, she had to hide so nobody saw her. In her final episodes, Anna kills Phelan after he shoots Nicola and Michelle and holds several residents hostage in the Bistro. Rush explained that Anna realises that Phelan is "pure evil" so decides to kill him before he kills her. She added, "I think in a moment of pure, frenzied anger and vengeance, she just picked the kitchen knife up and stabbed him. Then she was thrilled that she'd done it, because she could finally sleep." Rush hoped the audience would enjoy the storyline and believed that Anna's story had firmly ended.

== Storylines ==
Anna Windass first appears on screen with her long-term boyfriend Eddie (Steve Huison) when they refuse to pay builder Joe McIntyre (Reece Dinsdale) for a kitchen refit. Joe's protege David Platt (Jack P. Shepherd) then tries to force them to pay but they refuse. David then carries out his threat of retaliation by enlisting both his best friend Graeme Proctor (Craig Gazey) and Joe's daughter Tina (Michelle Keegan) to help set fire to the Windasses' kitchen. The trio succeed and they escape before Anna and Eddie's wayward son, Gary (Mikey North), could catch them.

Weeks later, however, the Windass family move into No. 6 Coronation Street with the rest of her family. She has a heart-to-heart with David's mother Gail (Helen Worth), who is also her new next-door neighbour and Joe's boyfriend, to make peace as she wants a fresh start in Coronation Street even though their families are feuding and convinces Eddie to make peace with Gail's partner, Joe. This ends badly at Christmas, as Gail's invitation for the Windasses to stop in for dinner soon leads to Joe throwing food at them and forcing them out of the house.

As the New Year in 2009 begins, Anna is dismayed as she senses Eddie sinking back into his con artist ways; she always objected to them and her character shows her desire to live a free life without stealing and scrounging money from society,. However, the feud between Gary and David grows more volatile and in March 2009 she is relieved when Gary is cleared of assaulting David in public; with Anna also attempting to convince both Gail and Tina to make David drop the charges. She is also seen breaking down on a number of occasions, trying to hold her family together.

In April 2009, Anna is given a job at the local café by owner Roy Cropper (David Neilson) and she manages to impress him with her work ethic; Roy's wife Hayley (Julie Hesmondhalgh) is initially sceptical but she too becomes impressed by Anna's services. Anna's friendship with Hayley strengthens when she takes the Croppers' side over being unhappy with Eddie after he steals and poses as Roy in a scam to receive free alcohol from the cash-and-carry.

In 2010, Anna is dismayed when Gary decides that he wants to join the army. She fears for his life on the front line, but eventually comes to terms with his career decision. However, Anna is later dismayed when Gary is reported as being AWOL; after she comforts him over his secret fears he returns to duty.

By then, Anna and Eddie are seeking to adopt a child. Anna's nephew, Rory visits while his parents are on holiday. Eddie is seen pushing Rory round in a pram, upsetting Becky as she thinks that Anna and Eddie have been given a child.

In early 2011, Anna is pleased when a young girl named Faye Butler (Ellie Leach) comes to stay with her and Eddie; so much so that the couple are given a view of becoming her foster parents. Faye is quite a troubled young girl and this causes a rift between Anna and Eddie as he becomes discouraged with fostering. Anna is adamant that she will support Faye, particularly after her biological mother is found dead, following a drug overdose. Eddie breaks the tragic news in quite a clumsy way to Faye and this angers Anna. Eventually, Eddie issues Anna with an ultimatum: him or Faye. Anna chooses Faye in the end and Eddie moves to Germany as a result.

Following Eddie's departure, Anna becomes romantically involved with Gary's boss Owen Armstrong (Ian Puleston-Davies) and the two start a relationship with each other. Coincidentally, Gary has begun dating Owen's eldest daughter Izzy (Cherylee Houston) and this often leads to conflict between the two men. Anna is dismayed when she discovers that her landlord Jerry Morton (Michael Starke) is planning to sell No. 6. Unable to afford to buy the house, she is worried as Faye has finally found stability in her new home. Owen, much to Anna's surprise, buys the house and becomes her new landlord. This brings them closer together, making Faye jealous as she fears that Owen will take Anna away from her. Their relationship goes well, and Anna supports Owen after he discovers his younger daughter Katy (Georgia May Foote) is pregnant and later helps deliver her son Joseph on Christmas Eve 2011.

In 2012, Owen and Anna's relationship is put to a test when Anna goes away to visit her brother; Owen looks after Faye and, after discovering that Faye had poisoned the fish he had bought for Anna's garden, slapped her. Faye locked herself in her room and has difficulty trusting Owen again. When Anna comes back and finds out what happened, she splits up with Owen as she is unable to forgive him for hitting Faye in a heat of a moment. But the couple soon get back together, especially when they learn that Izzy is pregnant and Gary is the father of her baby. Everyone is overjoyed but tragedy strikes when Izzy suffers a miscarriage later on. Due to her disability, they approach Katy about being a surrogate mother; however, Izzy is told that Katy is not a suitable candidate for surrogacy as she is too young. Towards the end of the year, however, the family is grateful when Tina offers to become the surrogate for Izzy and Gary's baby. The family discover that the implantation has worked and Tina is pregnant in December 2012.

A few months later, however, Anna is stunned to learn that Gary has developed a crush on Tina after discovering he bought her late father's wedding ring at a pawn shop after it was stolen. Anna keeps this secret, but Gary takes things too far when he tries to kiss Tina, but she rejects him. Izzy learns of this and Tina goes into premature labour. Tina gives birth to Gary and Izzy's baby son, "Jake", but Izzy does not want Gary to see him because of his betrayal. After seeing Gary and Izzy argue, Tina decides to keep the baby and raise him with her boyfriend, Tommy Duckworth (Chris Fountain). This leads to Anna insulting Tina on numerous occasions. When Gary tells Anna how long it could take to get residency, Anna storms into The Rovers and slaps Tina for taking "Jake", renamed Joe. Izzy and Gary are terrified that Tina will report Anna to Social Services, but she doesn't. Later, Izzy and Gary decide not to fight Tina but Tommy, Rita and Dennis convince Tina to allow "Joe" to be raised by his biological parents.

In 2013, Anna becomes stressed when Faye decides to live with her biological father, Tim Metcalfe (Joe Duttine). When Anna bans Faye from seeing Tim, she lies to Brian Packham (Peter Gunn), telling him that Anna hits her at home. Social workers Nicola Waite (Maxine Burth) and Stephen Bowyer (Dana Haqjoo) arrive to question Anna and Faye, who reveals that Anna has never hit her. Anna allows Faye to move in with Tim, making Anna break down in Owen's arms. When Tim goes on a trip to Newcastle for work, Faye tells him that she will stay with Anna and Owen but stays at Tim's flat alone. Faye is later caught stealing from Dev Alahan's (Jimmi Harkishin) shop by Mary Taylor (Patti Clare) and Sophie Webster (Brooke Vincent). Mary and Sophie tell Owen and Anna. Anna feeds Faye and gives her a shower, before angrily confronting Tim about leaving Faye home alone.

In Summer 2013, Tim begins a relationship with Anna's next-door neighbour Sally Webster (Sally Dynevor) and this sparks a bitter conflict between the two women; Anna grows particularly annoyed when Tim and Sally are constantly buying new things that impress Faye. Later on Sally decides to have a garden party on the same day that Anna is planning on having a barbecue, which leads to further friction and the guests being torn on which barbecue to attend, especially Roy and Hayley, as Sally is a close friend and Anna is their employee. When Anna runs out of tomato ketchup, she uses Sally's without permission, leading to a physical fight as Anna is on one side of the fence and Sally is on the other. The fight ends in disaster, however, when Sally and Anna go flying into Anna's back garden with the fence, smashed up and ruined.

A couple of months later, Anna grows wary when Faye brings her new friend Grace Piper (Ella-Grace Gregoire) home for tea. Grace seems lovely, and Anna falls for her tactics, but it is revealed that Grace is in fact a manipulative girl who uses Faye in her troublesome antics. Grace and Faye cause havoc all over Coronation Street, but it isn't until the pair start bullying the younger schoolboy Simon Barlow (Alex Bain) that things get too far. After Simon's stepmother Leanne Tilsley (Jane Danson) has confronted Faye over the incident, Anna asks for the truth but Faye keeps on telling her that she and Grace haven't done anything wrong. That night, Grace sends Faye a video of her attacking Simon, and it soon goes viral after she posts it onto the Internet. Mary, another victim of Grace and Faye's, sees the video first, and shows it to Tina as she is Simon's carer. The video travels around the street, disgusting most of the residents. Simon is refusing to leave the house because he is so embarrassed that he was attacked by girls. Soon, Simon's headmaster, Brian, gets wind of what has happened to him and goes round to the Windass household, where he tells a terrified Faye that he will have to inform the police. A few days later, Anna and Owen accompany Faye to the police station and they see Grace with her mother, who clashes with Anna. When Faye is questioned, she tells the detective that Grace has been blackmailing her, saying that if she grasses her up, she will make sure that nobody at her school will like her. Anna is proud of Faye for her bravery.

During this time, Anna has been supporting the Croppers' upon discovering that Hayley has been diagnosed with incurable pancreatic cancer. Soon enough Hayley collapses at home and is rushed to hospital. Anna does her best to look out for Roy but he accidentally spills the beans on Hayley's suicide wish, leaving Anna stunned. Roy is extremely guilty that he has confided in Anna about Hayley's privacy, and requests for her to not say anything to anybody about it. When Roy is decorating his and Hayley's bedroom, Anna gets Owen and Gary to decorate it for him, so Roy is free to do as he likes. When Hayley returns home from hospital, she reveals to Anna that she does not like the wallpaper but will pretend to like it for Roy's sake. Later that evening, Roy bumps into Anna on the street and tells her that he has told Hayley that he is fine with her suicide wish. He reveals to Anna that he feels he has lied to Hayley and betrayed her, but Anna does her best to comfort and support him over the situation.

From then onwards, Hayley's health continues to deteriorate as the New Year in 2014 commences. On 20 January 2014, Anna decides to close the café early after having a bad feeling about Hayley and Roy's situation all day. A few minutes later, Hayley's former boss Carla Connor (Alison King) arrives at the café and Anna answers the door. Carla also admits that she has had a bad feeling about the situation over the past few days. Carla then demands to see Hayley, but Anna tries to persuade her against the idea, thinking that leaving the couple alone would be the better choice. After giving in, Anna enters the café flat with Carla after using her spare set of keys, but the pair are saddened when they find that Hayley has died on the bed with Roy's arm around her. Anna sees the glass on Hayley's bedside cabinet and realizes that she had taken an overdose, and washes the glass up for them. Carla witnesses Anna washing the glass and also guesses that Hayley committed suicide. Anna then walks into The Rovers and reveals to the devastated regulars that Hayley has died. The following week Fiz Stape (Jennie McAlpine) - who was the Croppers' foster child a few years before - learns the truth about Hayley's death and shouts at Roy, storming out of the café. Anna then finds Fiz and explains that it was what Hayley wanted and that it was not assisted suicide. Following Hayley's funeral, Anna and the residents gradually cope with her death.

In 2014, prior to Hayley's death and following the aftermath of said impact, Anna has found herself caught up in Owen's business partnership with his old client: Pat Phelan (Connor McIntyre). She initially suspects Phelan of being a conman when Owen learns that he has not put his share into his account to put forward their business project, but a subsequent call that Owen makes to the bank later confirms that Phelan has indeed put his share onto the account. When Anna goes to apologize to Phelan over her reservations, he tries to flirt with her. This startles Anna, who confides in Izzy about his advances. With Phelan apparently growing interested in Anna, she decides to settle the score and invites him to her house on the following week to request that he stay away from her. However, Phelan accuses Anna of having romantic feelings for him and proceeds to force himself onto her before she eventually throws him out of the house. When Phelan and his wife Valerie (Caroline Berry) arrange for another dinner meeting with the couple along with their respective families in the Bistro, Anna feigns illness and runs back to the house. Izzy returns to see how Anna is, where she tells her that Phelan tried to rape her. Izzy reluctantly informs Gary about this, and he plans to confront Phelan by offering him a lift back to the house. By the time Owen and the rest of the workmen have left the site, Gary confronts Phelan and warns him to stay away from his mother. This ends badly, however, as Phelan provokes Gary into punching him when he badmouths Anna and they fight - which ends with Gary hitting Phelan across the head with a large plank of wood, knocking him unconscious. Though it appeared that Gary had killed Phelan in the brawl, Phelan survives and reveals to Gary and Owen that his attack was caught on CCTV. He blackmails them, saying if they do not do as he says, he will take the footage to the police. At work, Phelan forces Gary and Owen to do silly tasks - such as Gary being forced to dig a grave for a dead pigeon, and then taking out perfectly fitted windows. This eventually gets too much for Owen and Gary, particularly when Phelan decides to keep Owen's £80,000 investment in retribution for Gary's failed attempt to retaliate against him. Anna soon learns about this when she observes Owen having a breakdown, and later finds Gary suffering a panic attack. Anna calls Valerie and tells her how Phelan tried to rape her; however, she takes no notice - prompting Anna to berate Valerie before throwing her out of the house. She later tries to speak to Phelan, and he gives Anna an indecent ultimatum: he will release Gary and Owen from the contract if Anna has sex with him. Anna initially refuses, but reluctantly complies after finding Gary having another panic attack; she meets up with Phelan at a hotel, where they proceed to have sex. Anna then furiously leaves after Phelan teases her. On the following day, Phelan retains his promise and has Owen sign the contracts that releases him and Gary from the project - before leaving the street without the family or Valerie knowing what he and Anna had done.

Following her betrayal with Phelan, a regretful Anna cannot bring herself to be close or have sex with Owen - which devastates him. He confronts her, asking her whether she has fallen out of love with him or not. Anna replies with explaining that everything she has ever done is purely for their families, and that she still loves him. Owen later confides in Katy and breaks down in her arms. The guilt begins to get too much for Anna, who confides in Roy and tells him she has done something terrible. He urges her to tell Owen, and she organises a quiet night in so she can tell him about her night with Phelan. However, Izzy enters in floods of tears - so she does not tell Owen. In the week where Tina is murdered, Anna finally tells Owen about how she slept with Phelan to save him and Gary from further torment. Owen is distraught, even when Anna tries to make him see that she only did it for their relationship. Owen tells Anna that nothing will ever be the same for their relationship again. Owen then leaves Weatherfield for a short time for work, so Anna decides to tell Izzy and Katy about her night with Phelan. Izzy understands why Anna did what she did, but Katy is less forgiving, and implies that Anna is a "whore". When Owen returns a few weeks later, Faye organises a meal for him and Anna - explaining that it is going to get them back together. When Owen does not show up, Faye is livid and Anna decides it is time to tell her about her betrayal with Phelan but later decides to change her mind at the last minute. Anna tells Owen to act like they are still a couple for their family's sake. When Faye goes out with her friends and gets drunk, Anna and Owen are unhappy with Gary for giving her the money. Things soon get heated between Owen and Gary that leads to Owen punching Gary in front of everyone. Anna shouts at Owen for hitting Gary and tells him off before ordering Gary and Izzy to go home, while she tends to a drunken Faye.

A few weeks later, the couple are faced with another dilemma when the extent of Phelan's actions has resulted in Owen being declared bankrupt. The situation worsens when Owen receives letters from people who he has borrowed money from. Soon enough, bailiffs arrive at their household and begin taking their belongings, leaving Anna and Faye traumatized. When the bailiffs leave with most of their things, Owen tells Anna and their respective children that he will get them out of the mess he has got them into.

Despite the extent of Phelan's actions, however, Anna and Owen eventually manage to repair their relationship and become a proper couple. Their reconciliation happens just as Gary and Izzy break up with each other. Anna and Owen are upset by their children's split from their romance, but they nevertheless continue to support their union with Jake's unbringing.

In 2015, Anna becomes concerned for Faye and she worries that her daughter is getting bullied; she later believes that Faye's bullying may be becoming worse as Faye tells Anna that she is being mocked for her weight gain. Eventually, it is revealed to Anna and Owen that Faye recently found out she was pregnant and Anna is beside Faye as she gives birth to a baby girl. Rather than be mad at Faye for not telling her, Anna is determined to encourage Faye to be responsible for her daughter, even if it means her no longer being in school until she learns to take maternal responsibility for the baby. Anna invites the father and his family over to discuss the baby. The father is revealed to be a boy called Jackson Hodge (Rhys Cadman), who turns out to be Faye's classmate. As Jackson denies taking any responsibility for getting Faye pregnant and Jackson's mother makes cruel remarks about Faye coming onto her son, Anna is left fuming and kicks the family out. Anna's encouragement for Faye to be a mother towards baby Miley (as Faye has named her, after pop star Miley Cyrus) causes Owen to think that Anna was acting out of her own interests and that she was making Faye keep the baby so she can be a grandmother. But after a meeting with a social worker, when Owen confronts Anna with his suspicions, Anna breaks down over his harsh words and tells him that she only wanted Faye to be a good mother and that she didn't want her to regret giving Miley up.

It is at this point that Anna's romance with Owen has started to crumble, with the impact of Faye's pregnancy and the couple's difference of opinions on the matter straining their relationship. Things become even more problematic for the couple when Owen's ex-wife Linda Hancock (Jacqueline Leonard), also the mother of Izzy and Katy, turns up to reconcile with her daughters and later reveals to Anna and Gary in front of them that Owen forced her to stop contact with their daughters. Anna also believes that Owen has begun harbouring feelings for Linda again, to which Owen frequently denies over and over again. Anna and Owen later have a massive row over their past troubles, during which Anna realizes that Owen has never really managed to fully forgiven her betrayal with Phelan a year ago. Because of this and everything that has happened between them, Anna breaks up with Owen and declares their relationship is over. She nevertheless becomes saddened when Owen leaves Weatherfield with Katy to Portugal before he would proceed to embark on a new life himself in Aberdeen.

At Miley's christening, Faye does a runner from the church. Tim follows her outside and Faye admits to Tim that she's not ready to be a mother yet and that she thinks her mother doesn't understand how she feels. When Jackson's parents, Josie and Greig, offer to have Miley come live with them, both Anna and Tim are against the idea. However, they soon discovered this is the only option to prevent baby Miley from being adopted, and in that same month and year, the Windasses say a tearful goodbye to Miley and Josie drives off with the baby. In August 2015, the Hodges left Weatherfield with the baby for a new life in Canada, pretending to be on vacation. When Anna and Tim discovered this over a phone call, they told an upset Faye, who had a talk with her close friend Craig Tinker (Colson Smith) over the matter. Faye decided that Miley was better off in Canada, but when Tim confronted her over this decision, Faye told him that she has made up her mind and that Miley is with people that love her.

On New Year's Eve 2015, Anna begins a relationship with Sally's ex-husband Kevin Webster (Michael Le Vell) and they decide to keep it relationship a secret. But when Tim spotted them in a taxi, he too decided to keep it secret as he didn't want to hurt Sally after she had a kiss with Kevin on the previous year before her wedding. A couple of weeks later into the new year, though, Sally finds out about Anna's relationship with Kevin and questions them about it. Sally eventually gives Anna and Kevin her blessing after they help her and Tim prevent a councillor from removing the graffiti poster that Craig created in memory of Maddie Heath (Amy James-Kelly), the late girlfriend of Kevin and Sally's daughter Sophie (Brooke Vincent) who died not long ago.

In January 2016, Anna witnesses Kevin jumping on the road to save a man's life after the pair nearly get run over by pornographic offender Jamie Bowman (James Atherton) - the latter of whom had had robbed the Bistro and left Carla brutally unconscious just moments ago. Anna warels ieved when she rushed over to Kevin, glad that he was unharmed, but was shocked to see that the man who he ended up saving was Phelan. It turned out that Phelan had returned to the street following his split with Valerie, who had divorced him and left him penniless after discovering his true colours in the end. After informing Izzy of his return, Anna was startled when Phelan visited her and promised that she wouldn't cause him any trouble as long as he didn't either. Anna initially copes with Phelan's presence around the street, but is left furious when Phelan tells her that he will be staying in Weatherifeld after Kevin hired him to work at his garage. She later smashes his car with a metal pole and proceeds to physically attack him. Kevin, disgusted with Anna's behaviour, breaks up with her over her actions. The following day, Phelan arrives at the café when it is closed and attacks Anna - pinning her up against the wall. However, Kevin walks in and kicks Phelan out of the cafe. Anna later confides to him about what Phelan did to her, and Kevin promises to support her no matter what happens. When Anna learns that Phelan is spending quality time with her longtime neighbour Eileen Grimshaw (Sue Cleaver), she attempts to warn her about his nature by explaining how he blackmailed her into having sex with him; however, as Phelan had already manipulated Eileen into believing his version of the story between him and Anna, she refuses to believe her story and throws her out of the house. Anna leaves, and once again clashes with Phelan when he tells her that he'll be sticking around for as long as he pleases.

In October 2016, Anna and Kevin eventually agree to move in together, although she is disapproving of Gary's potential romance with David's brother Sarah (Tina O'Brien). Anna is present when a car accident on the street accidentally caused by David traps Gary as well as David's own daughter, Lily Platt. The locals gather together and manage to lift the vehicle in order to free Gary and Lily, but moments later the car explodes, causing Anna to fall in a puddle of petrol. A second explosion then rips through the street, and due to her being covered in petrol, Anna is set on fire. Kevin attempts to put the fire out with help from Gail's eldest son Nick Tilsley (Ben Price), and she is rushed to hospital - where Gary and Kevin are told that Anna's burns are severe, with her clothes melting into her skin. After the fire, Anna is left unable to walk unaided. She decides to end her relationship with Kevin, feeling that it is unfair to burden herself onto him. However, after persuasion from her family and friends, she reunites with Kevin.

As she slowly recuperates from the fire incident, Anna has become friends with Eileen's ex-boyfriend Michael Rodwell (Les Dennis) upon learning of their mutual disliking of Phelan; earlier on in March 2016, Phelan stole Eileen from Michael after destroying their relationship. In November 2016, Anna and Michael learn that Phelan and his partner-in-crime Vinny Ashford (Ian Kelsey) have been defrauding Sarah and the other residents in the course of their "Calcutta Street" flats scam development, They hatch a plot to bring Phelan down and expose his scam; while Michael breaks into the yard to obtain evidence against him, Anna invites Phelan to talk to stall for time and bribe him into leaving Weatherfield - stating just how much she resents him for what he did to her family and also realizing that he is in fact manipulating Eileen amid their relationship. When Phelan rejects Anna's attempt to bribe him into leaving Weatherfield, his phone rings and he discovers her conspiracy with Michael as a result. After smashing Anna's house out of anger whilst promising to make her "regret crossing him", Phelan went on to confront Michael - resulting in a showdown between them that ends with Michael having a heart attack; he dies with Phelan watching as he refuses to aid him. Anna feels guilty over Michael's death and tries desperately to expose Phelan for his role within the manslaughter, but is left unsuccessful after Phelan convinces the street of his innocence; when they learn the truth about his scam, Vinny had fled the street with their money, prompting Phelan to implicate him as the sole fraudster behind the scam whilst covering up his involvement against Anna's claims. At the end of December 2016, Anna's landlord and Simon's father Peter Barlow (Chris Gascoyne) returns to Weatherfield and decides he wants to move back into his old flat, leaving Anna homeless until Kevin suggests that she and Faye move in with him and his son, Jack. On New Year's Eve, while Kevin is at work, a powercut frightens Jack, which results in Anna falling down the stairs as she rushes to be with him. Jack leaves the house to find Kevin, however he finds Phelan who helps Anna after she regains consciousness.

When Anna found out that Faye was dating Seb Franklin (Harry Visinoni), a juvenile delinquent, she was furious - recounting how her last boyfriend got her pregnant. This caused a rift between Anna and Faye, particularly as her relationship with Seb also led to her forming a friendship with Phelan - who recently hired Seb to work for him. Faye proved her love for Seb by getting a tattoo, which soon got infected. Whilst they were at the hospital, Faye bumped into Jackson and their daughter Miley. This delighted Anna and Tim, but Seb becomes jealous and punches Jackson under the threat that both he and Miley stay away from Faye. This led to Seb getting arrested and land in a young offenders' institution. Faye, however, still loves Seb and asked Phelan if he can take her to see him. Anna eventually found out and angrily ordered Faye to stay away from them, which resulted in Faye running away from her and staying with Gary and Izzy. Eventually, they forgave each other.

Soon, Anna gets herself involved in Seb's family - as she found out that Seb is looking after his twin siblings Charlie and Lexi, as their mother, Abi (Sally Carman), is a heroin addict. After Abi took a heroin overdose, an ambulance was contacted and social services got involved and took the kids away. An angry and devastated Seb angrily accuses Anna of calling social services. After confining to Phelan about the situation, Seb insults Anna so she slaps him. Anna confronts Phelan about the altercation and lashes out when he mocks Owen over the recent loss of his daughter: Katie. However, she is overpowered and leaves - telling Phelan that he can "go to hell", to which he responds by telling Anna "after you". Not realizing that she left her earring behind at Phelan's yard, Anna witnesses Seb falling off a ladder whilst cleaning the solicitors' windows and she quickly calls an ambulance. At the hospital, she meets Seb's case worker: Nicola Rubinstein (Nicola Thorp), who she recently found out was Phelan's long-lost daughter. After a friendly conversation about Seb and their own personal problems, Anna confides in Nicola about Phelan by describing the events of her ordeal with him. The next day, Nicola would discover that Phelan had previously raped her mother Annabel - causing her to realize that Anna was telling the truth about her dad; she subsequently disowned Phelan afterwards.

When Phelan learns that Anna turned Nicola against him, he vows revenge and plans to implicate her as the culprit who caused Seb's ladder accident. He tells Seb that Anna pushed him off the ladder after planting an earring by the solicitor's door. Seb then told Faye, who called the police. She was arrested and was questioned by the police, strongly insisting that Phelan is setting her up. She was released pending further investigation and was angered to find out that very few people on the street believed her. She was furious when she found that Nicola was pregnant with Gary's baby. Afterwards, she attempted to trick Phelan into confessing on her mobile phone as to why he is framing her, however Phelan does not fall for it and pretends he didn't know what she was talking about. He then told Seb that he saw Anna push him, which led to Anna being arrested for the second time. This time, she was refused bail.

Tim and Sarah found out that Gary died in an explosion whilst working for the Ukraine. Anna was devastated and started to have a mental breakdown in her cell, leading to the prison taking her to see a doctor. However, she was relieved when she found out that Gary was alive all along. During Gary's next visit, Anna was overdosed after she took medication prescribed by her doctor and she collapsed while trying to get back into her cell. She was taken to hospital, where Kevin finished with her after he couldn't take any more of her obsession with Phelan. Whilst the doctor and her prison guard are not looking, Anna makes her escape.

Phelan called the police after finding out that Anna was at the Red Rec, with undercover police searching for her. Anna finds this out after Craig talked to a copper and so she escapes to Roy's café. The next morning, Anna broke into Phelan's office to try and find evidence that Phelan is lying. However, she heard footsteps and using a wrench, she hit Eileen unconscious by mistake, when she thought it was Phelan. Realizing that she could be caught, Anna plans her escape from the country with Faye. She then went back to see Eileen, but Phelan caught her out and called the ambulance and police. Anna and Faye escape to a car park, but were surrounded by the police, who ask her to come out of the vehicle. Realizing that she is now caught, she encouraged Faye to get out of the car, which she does. Anna was taken into custody once more. Phelan visits Anna again and threatens her family. A furious Anna slaps him in front of the guards and prisoners.

In January 2018, on the eve of her trial starting, Anna receives a visit from Eileen when she plans to question her about Phelan without his knowledge. Anna deduces that Phelan in unaware of Eileen visiting her and tries again to explain his nature by repeating her accusations; that Phelan killed Michael and bullied/conned the Weatherfield community. Eileen disbelieves Anna, even when she points out how the community merely believed Phelan's story that he was a victim in the scam ordeal and that Vinny was the sole fraudster who conned them. When Eileen lets slip that Seb has accused Phelan of murder, Anna believes that Phelan killed Vinny - which unbeknownst to her is true - and shouts out that he is a murderer, but is forced back into her cell and Eileen leaves unconvinced. When Gary and Tim visit her later on, Anna is shocked to learn that the victim whom Seb has accused Phelan of murdering was in fact their friend Luke Britton (Dean Fagan). She insists that they find Seb so he can testify against Phelan to stop him from inflicting more harm against the community.

Anna's trial soon begins and Phelan sticks to his story that Anna pushed Seb off the ladder. Seb, however, tells the truth in court and states that Phelan pressured him to say it to the police - angering Phelan. This gave the Windasses hope that Anna would be found not guilty. However, Eileen found CCTV footage of Gary and Tim dragging Seb into a car - making it look like they are kidnapping him and forcing him to change his story. As a result of this, Seb's testimony is destroyed and Anna's case looks doomed even when both Roy and Tim separately protest of her innocence. Anna then makes a last-ditch effort to describe Phelan as the "monster" he is by recalling how he forced her into sleeping with him, as well as explaining what he did to Owen and Michael respectively. Unfortunately, she is silenced and Anna is later found guilty of GBH. Anna screams to the court that she is innocent and Phelan is evil, but is taken away to her cells - apologizing to a heartbroken Faye whilst Phelan taunts her for apparently one final time. Anna is later wrongfully sentenced to five years in prison off-screen.

In March 2018, Eileen learns that Anna was telling the truth about Phelan's involvement in the "Calcutta Street" flats scam ordeal; Tim had arranged a meet-up with Phelan to expose what he did to Anna, and ended up recording him confess to orchestrating the scam. Two weeks later, the truth about Phelan is finally revealed when Gary and Seb infiltrate his worksite with the intent of locating the gun he used to kill Luke - only to unknowingly expose the corpses of Vinny and Andy, thus proving Anna's statement correct despite the fact that she never knew that Phelan killed Vinny, and Michael's surrogate son: Andy Carver (Oliver Farnworth). Back in 2017 during Anna's ordeal with Phelan, she and the rest of the street were left unaware that Phelan had locked Andy in a cellar for nearly a year ever since he married Eileen - at the time of which Andy had tried unsuccessfully to bring Phelan to justice after learning the truth about Michael and "Calcutta Street". On the day Anna had told Nicola the truth about her father, Phelan forced Andy to kill Vinny before executing Andy himself - after which he buried their corpses prior to framing Anna for Seb's ladder accident. When Tim informed Eileen about this, she confronts Phelan and he confesses to his crimes - which causes Eileen to realize that Anna was telling the truth about Phelan all along. While Phelan confirms Anna's theory that he killed Michael and that Seb was telling the truth about Luke as well, Eileen realizes that her husband had in fact raped Anna before going on to frame her for pushing Seb off a ladder - both of which Phelan refuses to admit committing. Their confrontation ends with Eileen kicking Phelan into the sea, seemingly killing him, and the street later discovers in April 2018 the extent of his crimes - thus proving that Anna was right about Phelan from the start.

In May 2018, a month after Ken's son Daniel Osbourne (Rob Mallard) had launched a public campaign for Anna to be released from prison, she returns to Weatherfield when Gary informs her that Phelan had in fact survived the fall. Gary had since then planned to abduct Phelan and keep him captive for him and Anna to get revenge on for what he did towards them, but this fails when Sarah learns what Gary did and their argument over informing the police about Phelan's return allows Phelan to escape. He then retrieves his gun, locks Gary and Sarah in the builder's yard, and goes on a rampage around the street. Anna then appears for the first time in four months when she frees Gary and Sarah from Phelan's captivity, and the trio rush over to Eileen's house following a gunshot. They find that Phelan knocked down both Eileen and Seb in a failed attempt to take his grandson Zac, shot Nicola in the ensuing struggle, and is currently holding the bistro hostage in a bid to seek medical treatment for his daughter. While Gary embraces Zac and Sarah attends to Eileen and Seb while awaiting arrival of emergency services, Anna pursues Phelan and enters the bistro through the back entrance. They come face-to-face when Anna sees Phelan taking Carla's sister-in-law Michelle (Kym Marsh), who was due to marry the restaurant's owner Robert Preston (Tristan Gemmill) moments ago, hostage in the kitchen. With Phelan distracted at facing Anna once more, Michelle seizes an opportunity to free herself from him - prompting Phelan to throw her aside and shoot Michelle in response. This prompts Anna to charge at Phelan with a knife and she stabs him in the chest just as he turns to shoot her, fatally wounding Phelan as he slumps onto the floor in pain. In the moment Carla and Robert rush to Michelle's aid and her son Ali Neeson (James Burrows) begins to give her medical treatment, Phelan makes a last-ditch attempt to get one over Anna by implicating her in his "murder". He pulls the knife from his chest and boasts how she will be imprisoned for his murder, but Michelle defends Anna by telling Phelan how she would describe the attack as self-defence - even though Anna replies that she doesn't have to do that. However, when Phelan points out that Michelle would risk imprisonment as a result, she states that she would take the risk regardless in retaliation for what he did to Andy and Luke. As Phelan reels over his ultimate loss, Anna walks up to him and taunts how people like him don't get to win in the end - before she then promises that Zac will never know of his existence once she acquaints herself with him. Anna then tells Phelan that she won the feud, and watches as Phelan takes his last breath and dies in front of her - finally ending his reign of terror at long last.

Shortly after Phelan's death, Anna reunites with her children and Kevin before later informing Eileen that he is dead. Eileen apologizes to Anna for disbelieving her, and they make amends in order to move on from Phelan. Just moments before watching Phelan's lifeless body being taken away in a private ambulance, Anna explains that she is leaving Weatherfield to start a new life in Durham and invites Faye to live with her; Faye accepts and leaves with Anna for a new life away from Weatherfield, but later returns to live with Tim - but confirms that Anna is doing well following her ordeal in Weatherfield.

== Reception ==
For her portrayal of Anna, Rush was nominated for Best Actress at The British Soap Awards 2015. Anna's return was nominated for Biggest OMG Soap moment at the 2018 Digital Spy Reader Awards; it came in second place with 16.2% of the total votes. Kris Green of media website Digital Spy commented that Anna and the Windass family had "settled in so well, in such a short space of time". Actor Mikey North attributed their success as characters to a combination of good writing and prominent plotlines received in a relatively short time period. In 2010, Dan Martin from The Guardian speculated that a member of the Windass family could be one of the characters to be killed-off in the soap's 50th anniversary special, as he believed that the "primary function of a big soap disaster is to sweep out the dead wood", and that the Windasses was some of the "characters we don't care about even if we noticed they were there".

Grace Dent of The Guardian wrote that she likes the character of Anna, pointing out her redeeming personality traits: "Chief apologist for all of these people is Anna Windass, Eddie's wife and Gary's mum, who is so surprisingly sweet and non-abrasive that she manages to keep her entire clan on the right side of likable just through hapless handwringing alone." She went on to say "I rather like Anna, although Gail Platt isn't a fan. I was expecting another Cilla Battersby-Brown, but instead she's more Emily Bishop in a sea-green velour fake Juicy Couture and Asda slippers. Anna knows that, children-wise, her and Gail have lots in common and they'd work better as a team than at war." Tony Stewart of The Mirror also describes Anna's character as a scrounger. MSN branded Anna and her family as chavs and suggested they would make the perfect guests for The Jeremy Kyle Show. Simon Swift of Soaplife magazine stated that at first, he couldn't help feeling that Anna and her clan are a bit too much like original neighbours-from-hell the Battersbys.

In 2009 Ruth Deller of entertainment website Lowculture, who runs a monthly feature of the most popular and unpopular soap opera characters, profiled the Windasses, adding that Anna is the main reason to why they were initially unpopular, stating: "The Windass family's introduction has not gone down too well, and Donna (sic) seems to be the prime target for the vitriol against them. Perhaps they can be redeemed a la the Jacksons in EE or the Timminses in Neighbours, or perhaps they'll just leave…" Kate White from Inside Soap said that Anna and Owen were a "great match". She could not understand why Anna could not just forgive Owen because she had with all of Eddie's crimes. In 2016 Laura-Jayne Tyler from Inside Soap praised Rush for her portrayal of the "horrific effects" of Anna's burns, saying that the character's pain "looks and sounds so authentic that you almost feel it". In October 2026, Danielle Kate Wroe from the Daily Mirror reported that viewers wrote on social media that they wanted Anna to return to the soap.
