= Izzy Armstrong =

Fictional character from Coronation Street

- Coronation Street character
- Portrayed by: Cherylee Houston
- Duration: 2010–present
- First appearance: 16 April 2010
- Introduced by: Kim Crowther
- Spin-off appearances: Gary's Army Diaries (2011); Coronation Street: Text Santa Special (2013)
In-universe information
- Occupation: Machinist
- Father: Owen Armstrong
- Mother: Linda Hancock
- Sisters: Katy Armstrong
- Sons: Jake Windass
- Nephews: Joseph Brown

Izzy Armstrong is a fictional character from the British ITV soap opera Coronation Street, played by Cherylee Houston. The character first appears on-screen on 16 April 2010; she is introduced as a new love interest for Kirk Sutherland (Andrew Whyment). Following her arrival, she gets a job at the Underworld factory. Upon her debut, she was heralded as the soap's first disabled regular character in 50 years. Izzy was the first member of the Armstrong family to be introduced, her father Owen and sister Katy arrived within two months after her first appearance.

In February 2021, after not being seen on air for a while, it was revealed Izzy had not and would not appear for a while due to Houston having to shield because of the COVID-19 pandemic, although she stated her intention to return when it is safe to do so. She briefly returned on 21 April and again on 7 June 2021 through video call.

== Creation and casting ==
Izzy grew up in a council house with her family. Her father Owen was faithful but her mother was an alcoholic and a drug addict who cheated on her husband. Izzy's mother left Owen for a man called Billy Jefferson. The character of Izzy was announced in early 2010 as a love interest for Kirk. It was announced that Izzy would be played by actress Cherylee Houston. Shortly afterwards the character's father was also confirmed to appear in Coronation Street in mid June 2010 along with her younger sister. Izzy is a wheelchair user. Commenting on her casting Cherylee Houston said "I’m really excited and well chuffed to be joining the show. I grew up with Coronation Street and I can’t wait to get start. I’m really looking forward to getting my teeth into the character."

Houston began filming in February 2010 and signed a contract for an initial seven episodes, which was soon extended for six months. Izzy is described as having a feisty and fiery personality. She is usually attracted to bad boys and has been known in the past to be a heartbreaker due to her troubled background and messy romantic history.

During the character's first episode she clashes with regulars such as Jason Grimshaw, Anna Windass and Gary Windass, establishing the character's strong personality. A few weeks later she clashes with other strong characters such as Liz McDonald to whom Liz takes a disliking. Izzy's surname was initially intended to be Butterfield, although by the transmission of her first episode it had been changed to Armstrong.

Upon her introduction to the programme, the character of Izzy was promoted as Coronation Street's first disabled regular, although Maud Grimes, who first appeared in 1993, also used a wheelchair. In one of Izzy's early scenes, viewers see Eddie Windass (Steve Huison) insult the feisty newcomer by telling Kirk: "You don't want to go out with a bird in a wheelchair." Asked how disabled viewers will have felt about the remark, Houston replied: "They were probably going, 'Thank God that's showing reality". Shortly after her first scenes producers were pleased with her impact and decided to introduce a family for her. Houston said in July 2012 that she is starting to adopt Izzy's accent, adding that she is a bit more diplomatic than Izzy is and does not fly off the handle as fast. Houston continued: "She can be quite dogmatic when she gets something between her teeth - she's always ready to bark!"

== Storylines ==
In April 2010, Izzy goes to The Rovers Return Inn for her date with Kirk Sutherland (Andrew Whyment), having arranged to meet him, via an online dating site. Disaster strikes when she spots Jason Grimshaw (Ryan Thomas) - who she believes to be Kirk as Kirk used Jason's photo on his profile, much to Jason's surprise. As Izzy storms out, she bumps into Gary Windass (Mikey North) and they argue. Gary takes a shine to her feistiness and when he bumps into her again later in the day, there's a clear spark. On 7 May, Kirk arranges another date with Izzy and this time, it goes well, as the conversation flows easily. She meets Fiz Stape (Jennie McAlpine) and Sean Tully (Antony Cotton) but snaps at David Platt (Jack P. Shepherd) and Graeme Proctor (Craig Gazey) for spying on them and accuses Liz McDonald (Beverley Callard) of talking down to her. Izzy then bosses Kirk into applying for a job as a machinist at Underworld, making Kirk wonder what he's let himself in for. When Carla Connor (Alison King) turns Kirk down, Izzy demands an explanation; Carla refuses to change her mind but offers Izzy a job as she is impressed by her spirit. Izzy, however, is worried about telling Kirk; however, he reassures her that he never really wanted the job and is happy when Carla offers him a job driving a delivery van.

In June 2010, Tony Gordon (Gray O'Brien) blows up Underworld, killing himself and Robbie Sloan (James Fleet), leaving her and her new colleagues jobless. The same day, her father Owen Armstrong (Ian Puleston-Davies) arrives at The Rovers while she is talking to Gary and she snaps at him for following her. Izzy and the other factory girls start work for Nick Tilsley (Ben Price) but Carla puts a stop to Nick's new business and reclaims her staff while Owen gets the contract to rebuild Underworld, annoying Izzy and Bill Webster (Peter Armitage). In August, Bill accidentally drops cement on her from some scaffolding, causing an argument when Owen tells Bill that he is too old to be a builder as he has just endangered Izzy. However, she tells Owen that the only one who treats her as disabled is him.

Izzy is secretly delighted when she sees Gary again in September. They arrange to meet for a drink but he stands her up when Kylie Platt (Paula Lane) seduces him. Izzy is not pleased to see them together the next day, calling Gary names for sleeping around but when Izzy is insulted in The Rovers, Gary steps in. This leads to a fight outside the pub, and the police question Gary. Izzy feels bad about this and urges Kirk, who saw the fight, not to tell the police anything so Gary will not be prosecuted. When Kirk, who secretly fancies Izzy, tells the police that he started the fight, Izzy softens towards Gary and tells him that she is glad that he is free. In November, Izzy is shocked to hear that Gary has been injured and one of his best friends, Luke "Quinny" Quinn (Steven Bell), has been killed. Gary comes home a few days later, and Izzy becomes concerned about Gary's aggressive behaviour and withdrawn manner as he is clearly suffering from post-traumatic stress disorder.

In January 2011, she asks Owen to give Gary a job at the builder's yard, and he agrees but sacks him after Gary attacks him and Jason when he is accidentally locked in the van. Owen tells Izzy he won't report him if she ends her relationship with him but Izzy defiantly refuses. In July 2011, Izzy is robbed by a gang of teenagers. After learning this, Gary becomes very overprotective and takes her wheelchair away so she can't leave. When Izzy's sister, Katy Armstrong (Georgia May Foote) and her boyfriend Chesney Brown (Sam Aston) visit, Gary tells them that she is asleep but Katy refuses to take no for an answer and tells Owen that Gary is acting strangely so he kicks the front door down when Gary refuses to answer, to find Gary and Izzy in the corner, crying. Gary lets Izzy go and recognizing that he needs help, gets counselling for his Post-Traumatic Stress. Izzy, scared by Gary's mental state, asks him to move out so he returns to live with Anna and on Christmas Day 2011, Izzy and Gary reunite, much to the delight of Gary's sister, Faye, who has been attempting to reunite the two.

In July 2012, Izzy tells Fiz that she is pregnant and Fiz persuades her to tell Gary. He is excited but she is worried about health problems for her and the baby until Dr. Matt Carter (Oliver Mellor) reassures her that the pregnancy should be relatively risk-free. She tells her family but Owen is sceptical and Izzy miscarries. Not wanting to risk miscarrying again as her health problems mean that she is more at risk, Izzy tells Katy that she isn't willing to try again, so she and Gary look into adopting. However, Gary's criminal history and mental health issues after Afghanistan mean he will not be allowed to adopt so when Izzy and Gary start talking about surrogates, Katy offers to help but Chesney, remembering how ill Katy was when she was pregnant with their son Joseph, is unhappy and asks Katy not to do it. Seeing Chesney's frustration and having doubts of her own, Izzy tells Katy that they won't be going ahead. However, in September, Tina McIntyre (Michelle Keegan) tells Owen that she would be interested if the price was right as she and her boyfriend, Tommy Duckworth (Chris Fountain), are in a lot of debt.

Tommy, like Chesney, is not happy about the idea but Tina ignores him. Tommy insists that she tell Izzy and Gary that she has changed her mind or he'll leave her. Tina initially agrees but when Owen demands they repay the money that he has already paid them and leave his flat, Tina goes ahead with the implantation process. Much to Tommy's disappointment, Tina's pregnancy is confirmed two weeks later and it becomes public knowledge after she faints in the street. Norris overhears Gary say that Tina is pregnant and everyone assumes she and Tommy are the parents but Tommy, struggling to cope with the situation, reveals the truth in the Rovers. Disgusted with Tommy's behaviour, Tina ends their relationship. Izzy begins to feel left out when Gary and Tina go to antenatal classes together. When Tina finds out, she promises to involve her more. However, Gary becomes smitten with Tina and ends up making a pass at her, but Tina rejects him. Tina and Gary agree to keep it a secret but Izzy overhears them talking about it. As Izzy and Gary argue, Tina goes into premature labour and has the baby.

Gary and Izzy name him "Jake", a name which Tina, who is becoming increasingly attached to the baby, is unimpressed with. As the baby's life hangs in the balance, Izzy refuses to allow Gary near him. When Tina realises how much they are arguing, she tells them neither of them can see the baby until they sort it out. Izzy and Gary agree to stop arguing but are devastated when Tina tells them that she's keeping the baby and renames him Joe, after her late father Joe McIntyre (Reece Dinsdale). After visiting lawyers, they realise it will take years to win; Tina is legally Joe's mother as she gave birth to him. Izzy gives up, telling Tina she can keep him. However, seeing how much she loves Joe, Tina decides to give him back to Izzy and Gary, who change his name back to Jake. Shortly after, Izzy forgives Gary for making a pass at Tina and he moves back in with her.

In 2015, Izzy and Katy's estranged mother, Linda Hancock (Jacqueline Leonard), arrives from Portugal after a lengthy absence, having abandoned Izzy when she was a child. Izzy is disgusted with her, and said she used to tell her friends at school that her mother was dead, but they soon make amends and Katy agrees to join Linda in Portugal to start a new life with Joseph.

In 2016, Izzy starts using marijuana to relieve her chronic pain. She is arrested for buying cannabis and assaulting a police officer. She loses her temper in court. The court expresses sympathy for her, but is nonetheless she is sentenced to two months in prison.

== Reception ==
Actress Cherylee Houston was Nominated for Best Newcomer at the Inside Soap Awards 2010 for her portrayal of Izzy Armstrong but lost out to Emmett J. Scanlan, who plays Brendan Brady in the Channel 4 rival soap opera Hollyoaks.
