= Owen Armstrong =

Fictional character from Coronation Street

- Coronation Street character
- Portrayed by: Ian Puleston-Davies
- Duration: 2010–2015, 2027
- First appearance: 9 June 2010
- Introduced by: Kim Crowther
In-universe information
- Occupation: Builder; Businessman
- Wife: Linda Hancock (backstory)
- Daughters: Izzy Armstrong; Katy Armstrong
- Grandsons: Joseph Brown; Jake Windass

Owen Armstrong is a fictional character from the British ITV soap opera Coronation Street, played by Ian Puleston-Davies. He made his first on-screen appearance on 9 June 2010 and left the show on 15 April 2015.

In his story arc, Owen became the new landlord of Weatherfield after he originally arrived on the street to reconcile with his two daughters Izzy (Cherylee Houston) and Katy (Georgia May Foote) respectively. He later employed Izzy's boyfriend Gary Windass (Mikey North) as his protégé and established a relationship with the latter's mother Anna (Debbie Rush) as the two families began living together. It was then Owen ended up getting bankrupt following a disastrous business partnership with his old acquaintance Pat Phelan (Connor McIntyre). In November 2014, it was announced that Puleston-Davies had quit the serial and the character eventually left the series on 15 April 2015.

Over 11 years later, it was announced on 21 October 2026 that Owen will return and Puleston-Davies will reprise the role in 2027.

== Casting ==
In January 2010, it was announced that actor Ian Puleston-Davies had joined the cast of Coronation Street as Owen, the psychotic father of Izzy (Cherylee Houston). Coronation Street producer, Kim Crowther called Puleston-Davies a "wonderful actor" and added that she had "really high hopes" for him. He signed an initial six-month contract. Coronation Street producers approached Puleston-Davies about appearing in the show after they saw him star in the play, Everybody Loves A Winner in 2009. Puleston-Davies met with producers, who created the role of Owen especially for him. He began filming his scenes in February. Owen was originally given the surname of Butterfield, but this was later changed to Armstrong. Georgia May Foote was later cast as Owen's other daughter, Katy Armstrong.

== Development ==
=== Characterisation ===
Coronation Street describes Owen as "tough-but-tender". Crowther described him as "a bit controlling" having brought up Izzy and Katy alone. Sue Crawford of the Daily Mirror described him as a "tough-talking businessman" and "over-protective". In an interview with the Daily Mirror, Puleston-Davies called Owen a "loveable rogue", stating: "He has an edge and I'm happy to report he turns out to be a player." During an interview with media entertainment website Digital Spy, Coronation Street's new producer, Phil Collinson explained that Owen is "quite a dark, brooding character" who would "set the cat among the pigeons". Collinson added that Owen is a "very different bad boy" and potentially dangerous. In December 2010, Puleston-Davies defended Owen's violent nature and manipulative ways, saying, "He's not an evil man with an axe, or a hammer! Everything he does has reasoning behind it. He's got morals – but they're his own morals. Don't write Owen off – he's not an out-and-out bad guy... honest!"

=== Storyline development ===
Owen meets Liz McDonald (Beverly Callard) and the pair embark on an "unlikely relationship". The Daily Mirror said that Liz and Eileen Grimshaw (Sue Cleaver) both fall "head over heels" for his cheeky charm. Puleston-Davies told the Daily Mirror that Owen likes Liz, but causes competition between her and Eileen and plays them off against each other. Owen finds himself on the receiving end of Jim's "acid tongue" after Liz shows her feelings towards him. Jim becomes jealous of Owen and Liz and causes problems between them. When asked about Owen and Liz's relationship in an interview with Digital Spy, Callard admitted that Liz can be "so stupid". She said "Liz thinks he's great, but of course the viewers know different. They're just beginning to see another side of him. Liz is completely unaware of that. She's so stupid sometimes!" Cleaver described Owen as "a nasty piece of work" and "not the sort of man you want to cross".

Eileen later discovers that Liz is really the object of Owen's affections. Of this, Cleaver said that Eileen is a "very bad judge of character" and would seek her revenge on Owen. In January 2011, Eileen steals a £10,000 cheque from Owen whilst balancing his books. Eileen steals the cheque in order to pay for the repairs to her damaged roof. Speaking to soap opera reporting magazine Inside Soap about the plot, Cleaver explained: "Eileen's petrified because she knows what a nasty piece of work Owen is – and, at the end of the day, she's broken the law. Owen isn't a pussycat like Lloyd and Steve – he doesn't take prisoners. I think Eileen's right to be afraid!" Cleaver later told soap opera reporting magazine Soaplife that Eileen thinks Owen "won't miss the money". When Eileen pays the cheque into the bank, she knows she has made a mistake, and decides to pay it back. Cleaver said Eileen feels guilty because Owen is being nice to her and repairing her roof. Owen's bank card is then rejected, even though Carla Connor (Alison King) has told him that she paid Eileen the £10,000 she owed. Cleaver said Eileen is terrified when Owen tells her he knows she has stolen the money, and threatens to go to the police. Cleaver added: "[Eileen's half-sister] Julie [Carp] (Katy Cavanagh) points out Eileen's got far more on Owen than he's got on her. But Eileen's scared."

=== Departure ===
On 17 November 2014, it was announced that Puleston-Davies had quit the show. Speaking of his departure, Puleston-Davies said "Next year I will have been playing Owen Armstrong for five years and it felt like a good point to move on and take some time to focus on new projects. "I have returned to my other passion of writing and in 2015 hope to put on a new play. I have had a fantastic time at Coronation Street and made some great friends. I certainly would never rule out returning to the role of Owen at some point in the future if I was asked."

=== Return ===
On 21 October 2026, it was announced that Owen is returning to the show and that Puleston-Davies will reprise the role; he is expected to make a comeback in early 2027.

== Storylines ==
Owen Armstrong first arrived in Weatherfield to visit his daughter Izzy (Cherylee Houston), but she is reluctant to have any involvement with him. He apologises to Izzy for his past mistakes and agrees to give her independence, though he disapproves of her relationship with Gary Windass (Mikey North). Local builder Bill Webster (Peter Armitage) is angry when Owen secures a building contract, but Bill is soon persuaded to retire and sell the Builder's Yard to Owen, so he moves into the flat above with younger daughter Katy (Georgia May Foote). Owen dates his administrator Eileen Grimshaw (Sue Cleaver) but is also attracted to Liz McDonald (Beverley Callard), the Landlady of The Rovers Return Inn. He kisses Liz, and Sean Tully (Antony Cotton) tells Eileen the truth.

Owen forbids Katy to date Chesney Brown (Sam Aston) but they later convince him that they are serious about committing to one another. Liz's ex-husband, Jim (Charles Lawson) disapproves of Owen and Liz's relationship and Owen realizes that Liz has feelings for Jim, so he breaks up with her. When Gary attacks Owen after suffering from post-traumatic stress disorder, he tries to ruin his relationship with Izzy. When Eileen's insurance company refuses to pay the costs to repair her damaged roof, she blames Owen. He informs her a full roof survey should have been done. Eileen steals a £10,000 cheque that Carla Connor (Alison King) has written for Owen. He feels guilty and offers to repair Eileen's roof. Owen's bank card is rejected and he realises that his money has been stolen. Eileen and Julie Carp (Katy Cavanagh) steal documents proving Owen has committed tax evasion. When Owen threatens to call the police, she blackmails him with the documents – only for Owen to later steal Jason's keys and reclaim the documents before reporting Eileen to the police. Following her arrest, Izzy convinces him to drop the charges. Owen has further reservations over Katy and Chesney's relationship when Katy becomes pregnant. She eventually manages to convince him to support her decision and Chesney buys No. 5 Coronation Street with his sister Fiz Stape (Jennie McAlpine). Katy then moves in with Chesney, Fiz and Fiz's baby daughter Hope.

Owen buys No. 6 Coronation Street so that his girlfriend, Gary's mother Anna Windass (Debbie Rush), will have a secure home for her adoptive daughter, Faye (Ellie Leach). Faye takes a dislike to Owen and tries to stop him and Anna becoming romantically involved. Anna decides to avoid Owen's advances, wanting to respect Faye's opinion. However, they later begin a relationship and following Faye's constant pranks and attitude, Owen smacks her across the legs. Anna refuses to speak to Owen, but after some time apart and an intervention from Gary, they reconcile: Faye eventually accepts Owen, who soon moves in with the Windass family and later hires Gary under his employment.

Following a miscarriage, Izzy is desperate to have a baby. Owen pays Tina McIntyre (Michelle Keegan) to act as a surrogate mother and also lets her stay at his flat rent-free. When Tina gives birth to a baby boy, who Gary and Izzy name Jake, she decides to keep him for herself and renames him "Joe", in honour of her late father. Owen evicts Tina from the flat and demands she return the money he paid her. After realising that Joe/Jake is better off with Gary and Izzy, she hands him back; Owen later makes amends with Tina and allows her to spend time with Jake.

Owen soon has a run-in with his nefarious client Pat Phelan (Connor McIntyre), who refuses to pay upon claiming bankruptcy. When his attempt to get Phelan's wife Valerie (Caroline Berry) to pay what her husband owed doesn't work, Owen steals Phelan's £20,000 motorbike and locks it up at the Builder's Yard; Phelan later confronts Owen, but is forced to pay when Owen makes it clear that he knows about his "shady" past. Towards the start of 2014, Phelan returns with a business proposition for Owen – offering him a 20% stake in a block of luxury flats being built if he invests. Anna and Gary become concerned that Phelan will con them, but Katy convinces Owen to move forward with the plan. Owen invests £80,000 into the deal while Anna remains insistent that Phelan is a conman.

When it appears that Phelan may have conned them after his share isn't put into the account, Owen suspects that Anna may have been right and confronts Phelan – only to learn that his share has already been secured in the account. Anna later visits Phelan to apologise for Owen's outburst, but is left uneasy when it becomes apparent that he is attracted to her. Phelan continues to show signs of attraction towards Anna, who doesn't tell Owen about this. She soon invites Phelan around to the house and tells him to stay away from her, but he makes a move on her before leaving. When Gary finds out about this, he confronts Phelan at the builder's yard and tells him to stay away from his mum. However, after Phelan brands her a "tart", Gary attacks him and knocks him out with a plank of wood. Believing him to be dead, he calls Owen in a panic. Phelan's body disappears, and a few days later, he is revealed to be alive when he confronts Owen and Gary and tells them that the attack has been caught on CCTV, which includes Gary leaving him for dead. He then proceeds to blackmail them by demanding that they work on the rest of the flats for free, which would leave Owen bankrupt, or he'd take the tape to the police and have Gary arrested. Having no other choice, Owen agrees and he loses everything. Owen and his family are forced to move into the flat at 19a Rosamund Street.

Owen's ex-wife, Linda Hancock (Jacqueline Leonard), arrives and wants to see her daughters. It is revealed that Owen lied about why she left; she had been having an affair and when Owen discovered this, he threw her out and refused to let her see their daughters. He desperately tries to explain himself but his daughters are furious, especially Katy, who feels she was robbed of having a mother-daughter relationship. Linda bonds with Izzy and Katy, much to Owen's annoyance. Linda later admits that she still has feelings for Owen and invites him to join her in Portugal, which he declines. He is stunned when Katy reveals she's moving away with her mother, and Owen's family starts to fall apart. This puts a strain on his relationship with Anna.

After discovering Faye's shock pregnancy, Owen lashes out at sixteen-year-old Craig Tinker (Colson Smith), as he and many other people suspected that he was the father, due to him being close friends with Faye. Faye is persuaded to reveal the identity of the baby's biological father, so as to clear Craig's name. Realising that his relationship with Anna is over for good, Owen cannot live in Weatherfield without her, so he decides to go and live in Aberdeen, after visiting Katy and Joseph in Portugal first. Owen and Anna share an emotional farewell, as Owen leaves the street for a new life in Scotland.

== Reception ==
Sue Crawford from the Daily Mirror said that Puleston-Davies had made a "big impact" since joining Coronation Street. In October 2026, Danielle Kate Wroe from the Daily Mirror reported how various viewers expressed their happiness about the character returning.
