= List of Fake Reaction episodes =

This is a list of episodes of Fake Reaction, a British comedy panel game show on ITV2. The show is presented by Matt Edmondson with team captains Joe Swash and Ellie Taylor.

== Series overview ==
Series	Episodes	Originally released	
Series	Episodes	First released	Last released
1	8	3 January 2013	21 February 2013
2	10	2 January 2014	6 March 2014

== Episodes ==
The coloured backgrounds denote the result of each of the shows:

– indicates Joe's team won
– indicates Ellie's team won

=== Series 1 (2013) ===
No. overall	No. in series	Ellie's team	Joe's team	Original release date
1	1	Gemma Collins and Fazer	Chris Martin and Jennifer Metcalfe	3 January 2013
2	2	Greg Rutherford and Brian Belo	Jeff Leach and Kimberly Wyatt	10 January 2013
3	3	Iain Stirling and Harry Judd	Sinitta and Laura Whitmore	17 January 2013
4	4	Kian Egan and Brian Dowling	Amy Childs and Tiffany Stevenson	24 January 2013
5	5	Rob Beckett and Brooke Vincent	Ashley Roberts and Michelle de Swarte	31 January 2013
6	6	Lethal Bizzle and Matthew Crosby	Chelsee Healey and Tom Deacon	7 February 2013
7	7	Patrick Monahan and Jessie Cave	Katherine Ryan and James Argent	14 February 2013
8	8	Roxanne Pallett and Ollie Locke	Nicola Adams and Tom Craine	21 February 2013

=== Series 2 (2014) ===
No. overall	No. in series	Ellie's team	Joe's team	Original release date
9	1	Helen Flanagan and Brian McFadden	Marlon Davis and Vogue Williams	2 January 2014
10	2	Charlotte Crosby and Gemma Cairney	Ivo Graham and Louie Spence	9 January 2014
11	3	Mikey North and Kirk Norcross	Laura Whitmore and Tom Deacon	16 January 2014
12	4	Louis Smith and Kate Nash	Alex Brooker and Bobby Mair	23 January 2014
13	5	Matt Johnson and Kerry Katona	Francesca Hull and Patrick Monahan	30 January 2014
14	6	Ben Shires and Joe McElderry	Georgia May Foote and Jeff Brazier	6 February 2014
15	7	Eddie "The Eagle" Edwards and Dane Bowers	Stefan Abingdon and Nikki Sanderson	13 February 2014
16	8	Ollie Locke and Brian Belo	AJ Odudu and David Morgan	20 February 2014
17	9	Rylan Clark and Josie Gibson	Natalie Anderson and Matt Richardson	27 February 2014
18	10	Dougie Poynter and Ryan Fletcher	Mutya Buena and Mae Martin	6 March 2014
