= Katy Armstrong =

Fictional character from Coronation Street

- Coronation Street character
- Portrayed by: Georgia May Foote
- Duration: 2010–2015
- First appearance: 30 July 2010
- Last appearance: 20 March 2015
- Introduced by: Phil Collinson
- Spin-off appearances: Coronation Street: Text Santa Special (2013)
In-universe information
- Occupation: Catering assistant at Prima Doner; Gym receptionist
- Father: Owen Armstrong
- Mother: Linda Hancock
- Sisters: Izzy Armstrong
- Sons: Joseph Brown
- Nephews: Jake Windass

Katy Armstrong is a fictional character from the British ITV soap opera Coronation Street, played by Georgia May Foote. The character's first appearance was broadcast on 30 July 2010 and she made her final appearance on 20 March 2015.

In the show, Katy is the youngest daughter of Owen Armstrong (Ian Puleston-Davies) and sister of Izzy Armstrong (Cherylee Houston). The character's storylines mainly revolve around her relationship with Chesney Brown (Sam Aston), her pregnancy and son Joseph Brown (Lucca-Owen Warwick), and her affair with Ryan Connor (Sol Heras).

Foote's departure from the show was announced in April 2014. She filmed her final scenes on 16 February 2015. Katy was killed in an off-screen car accident in Portugal on 18 October 2017, facilitating the return of Joseph (now William Flanagan).

== Creation and development ==
=== Casting ===
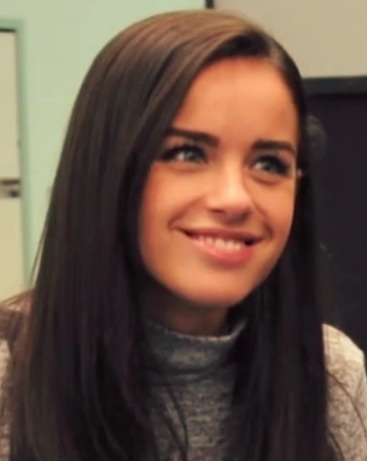
Georgia May Foote (pictured) was cast as Katy in 2010, after already making a previous guest appearance in the soap.

On 9 June 2010, Daniel Kilkelly from Digital Spy announced that former Grange Hill actress Georgia May Foote had joined the cast of Coronation Street as Katy Armstrong. Foote was working in her local fish and chip shop when she learned that she had won the role, following an audition. She began filming her first scenes around the time of her casting announcement. Foote had previously made a guest appearance in Coronation Street as Jess Burrows in January 2010. Foote's "feisty and outspoken" character was introduced as the sister of Izzy Armstrong (Cherylee Houston) and a love interest for Chesney Brown (Sam Aston).

=== Relationship with Chesney Brown and motherhood ===
Katy arrives in Coronation Street to visit her older sister, Izzy. She meets Chesney at a birthday party and is "instantly attracted" to him. A show spokesperson explained: "She loves the fact that he flogs stuff down the market, and he can't believe his luck when she asks him out. She's absolutely gorgeous and he really couldn't have asked for a sexier first girlfriend." Katy and Chesney begin dating and Foote revealed that she wanted the couple to go the distance, saying "I'd like to see them make a go of it, they're a sweet couple – as long as Chesney does as he's told!" The actress commented that she enjoyed working with Aston, as they had attended the same drama school and had "a laugh" together, a fact the writers reflected on screen. The couple were seen discussing the future of their relationship and whether to take things further. The spokesperson revealed that the storyline would be handled responsibly and Katy and Chesney would talk about the various contraceptives they could use. Katy and Chesney plan to have sex at her house when they learn her father, Owen (Ian Puleston-Davies), will be out of the house. However, shortly after Chesney arrives at Katy's, Owen decides to stay home and "scuppers the young lovers' plans". Chesney then learns his house is empty and he and Katy go there and have sex for the first time. Owen later finds out what has happened and he "hits the roof".

In February 2011, it was announced Katy would reveal her desire to have a child. She suggests starting a family to Chesney, who is left shocked because he believes they are too young to become parents. Kilkelly reported "However, after Katy continues to push the idea, Chesney is expected to change his mind and begin looking for a flat that he can rent with his girlfriend." A few months later, Foote explained Katy's motive behind her desire for a child was her mother's abandonment of her family. From that point, she did not have "a proper family" and Chesney experienced a similar situation. The actress revealed "They both feel like they're missing out on something, so Katy came up with the idea of having a baby and moving out of home". When Katy and Chesney learn that they are expecting a baby, they wonder how to tell their respective families. Foote believed Chesney's sister would be shocked, while Owen would "absolutely flip" because it is not what he wanted for his daughter.

=== Affair with Ryan Connor ===
While Katy and Ryan are running an errand together, their van breaks down and they end up sharing a kiss. The following month, Foote teased the storyline during an appearance on Daybreak explaining that it begins when Katy is teased by her friends for being dull. The actress continued "It's her friend's 18th birthday, so they're having a party. They all keep taking the mick out of her, saying she's sitting at home and she's boring. She just wants to go out and have fun, and then [Ryan] starts making a bit of a move on her!" Ryan "sees Katy in a new light" when she turns up at The Bistro for her friend's birthday, where he is DJing. Heras commented that his character has not really noticed Katy before, as she is a stay-at-home mother, but seeing her "dolled up" and in his environment catches his attention. Heras said "He realises how pretty she is and what a gorgeous girl she is. He manages to sort it for her to get a job at the kebab shop and yes, he probably does have an ulterior motive."

Katy and Ryan start to become closer at the kebab shop and one day go in for another kiss. Foote believed that Katy had not had a "teenage wild time" because of her relationship with Chesney and their son, so her head is turned by Ryan and it is exciting for her. Foote added that Katy does not mean to hurt Chesney, but the situation with Ryan gets out of her control. Chesney later proposes to Katy in front of their family and friends at Faye's (Ellie Leach) birthday party, but hours later he learns about her affair with Ryan. The Daily Star's Peter Dyke and Katie Begley reported that Chesney would confront Katy in front of their son, demanding to know whether she had sex with Ryan and threatening to beat him up. Chesney then "calls time on their romance" and throws Katy out.

=== Departure ===
On 27 April 2014, it was announced that Foote had been written out of the show. Foote stated that while she was sad to be leaving, she was excited about the challenge of future roles. She also praised her character's storylines and her co-stars. Executive producer Stuart Blackburn confirmed that Katy would not be killed off and that the door would be left open for a possible return in the future. Foote filmed her final scenes in February 2015. Katy was killed off-screen in a car accident on 18 October 2017.

== Storylines ==
Katy attends Chesney Brown's 16th birthday party with her sister, Izzy; she and Chesney get drunk and ride Izzy's wheelchair around the street, but are caught by Katy's father, Owen. Chesney invites Katy to Roy (portrayed by David Neilson) and Hayley Cropper's (portrayed by Julie Hesmondhalgh) wedding reception, and they soon become close. She opens up to him about her mother, who could not deal with Izzy's disability and walked out on the family. Owen takes an aversion to Katy's growing bond with Chesney, and Katy uses Izzy to cover for her when she and Chesney sleep together. When Owen discovers what has happened, he and Katy argue, and she decides to leave home. The couple soon realises that they cannot afford their own flat, but Katy moves in with Chesney at 5 Coronation Street. A few months later, Chesney and Katy rent a flat on Victoria Street.

When Katy discovers she is pregnant, Owen suggests an abortion. Katy talks through her options with Izzy. When Chesney is kidnapped by John Stape (portrayed by Graeme Hawley), she believes he has disappeared and decides on an abortion, but changes her mind when he returns. When Fiz Stape (portrayed by Jennie McAlpine), Chesney's sister and John's wife, is arrested, Katy helps to look after her young daughter Hope (originally portrayed by Harriet Atkins and Sadie Pilbury). Katy is cast as Mary in the local nativity play, and goes into labour during the performance. Anna Windass (portrayed by Debbie Rush) assists in delivering Katy and Chesney's son, Joseph.

Katy struggles with being a mother and leaves Joseph unattended while she goes out; she briefly leaves the Street as she doubts her parenting skills, but returns after talking with Izzy. After Izzy miscarries, Katy offers to be a surrogate for her and Gary Windass (portrayed by Mikey North). A fertility clinic counsellor questions whether Katy is emotionally strong enough to give up a baby, causing Izzy to change her mind about surrogacy.

Katy develops a crush on Ryan Connor and begins a short-lived affair with him. Katy and Ryan are spotted by Gary, who punches Ryan. Chesney realises that Katy has been cheating on him and throws her out onto the street. Katy and Joseph move in with Owen and Anna. Owen struggles to accept Ryan as part of the family, and Katy moves in with Ryan, his mother, Michelle Connor (portrayed by Kym Marsh), and Michelle's boyfriend, Steve McDonald (portrayed by Simon Gregson). Chesney begins dating Sinead Tinker (portrayed by Katie McGlynn). Katy discovers that Gary tried to kiss her surrogate mother, Tina McIntyre (Michelle Keegan), and inadvertently reveals the truth to Izzy. Tina goes into labour with Izzy and Gary's baby two months prematurely. Izzy cuts off her links with Gary, Katy, and Ryan.

Katy tells Chesney that she does not like how much time Sinead spends with Joseph. When Chesney makes a remark about Ryan and his drug addiction, Katy leaves. Sinead sees that Chesney is using her to get back at Katy. When Katy and Ryan ask Chesney to babysit, it leads to a row with Sinead. Katy and Sinead clash, leading to an argument in the street. When Chesney tells Katy that Ryan was spotted with another girl, Jamie-Lee (portrayed by Kate Holderness), Katy looks at Ryan's phone and sees a series of text messages from Jamie-Lee. Katy breaks up with Ryan and begs Chesney for another chance, but he refuses.

Katy and Chesney eventually reunite, but both realise that they are only back together for the sake of Joseph, so they decide to break up again. Katy's friend, Steph Britton (portrayed by Tisha Merry), moves onto the Street and persuades Katy to attend a party thrown by their mutual enemy. Katy goes head-to-head with Gail McIntyre (portrayed by Helen Worth), in order to get a job as a receptionist at the new gym run by Dev Alahan (portrayed by Jimmi Harkishin) and Kal Nazir (portrayed by Jimi Mistry). Dev wants to hire Katy, while Kal prefers Gail for the job. Katy and Gail hear the way that Dev and Kal are talking about them, and they come to a decision where they will work part-time, with the wages being pushed up by £1.

When Katy finds out that Anna slept with Owen's former business partner, Pat Phelan (portrayed by Connor McIntyre), she decides to take Joseph to live in Steph's flat. She later has a short-term relationship with Callum Logan (portrayed by Sean Ward). Katy and Izzy's mother, Linda Hancock (portrayed by Jacqueline Leonard), arrives in Weatherfield and Katy grows fond of her. She asks Katy to move away back to Portugal with her, and after talking it over with Chesney, she and Joseph leave Weatherfield.

On 18 October 2017, Izzy gets a phone call from Owen, revealing that Katy has been killed in a car crash.

== Reception ==
For her portrayal of Katy, Foote was included on the long-list for Best Soap Newcomer at the 2011 TV Choice Awards. Roz Laws, writing for the Sunday Mercury, commented "Katy and Chesney are barely out of nappies but the young lovers are moving in together. I think Katy has been watching too much Big Fat Gypsy Weddings, as she's left school to become a teenage mum and housewife." During her review of Coronation Street's Christmas storylines, Sarah Dempster from The Guardian commented "Sing hosanna, then, for Katy Armstrong's uterus. The impetuous organ presented Weatherfield with its first ever nativity-within-a-nativity, a neonatal turducken that would (temporarily) muffle the chaos and (briefly) drown out the boo-hooing."

In February 2013, Laura Morgan from All About Soap wrote "Forget the upcoming Rovers fire, the most smoking thing on the street has to be the growing attraction between hot couple Katy and Ryan. This sexy young pair look so damn good together you'd be forgiven for forgetting that Katy's actually already spoken for. Whoops!" Morgan added that while Katy and Chesney are sweet, she had never bought into their relationship and thought that it was about time Katy looked for excitement elsewhere.
