= Tina McIntyre =

Fictional character from Coronation Street

- Coronation Street character
- Portrayed by: Michelle Keegan
- Duration: 2008–2014
- First appearance: Episode 6724; 7 January 2008
- Last appearance: Episode 8411; 23 June 2014
- Introduced by: Steve Frost
- Spin-off appearances: Out of Africa (2008); Coronation Street: Text Santa Special (2013)
- Crossover appearances: The Jeremy Kyle Show (2010)
In-universe information
- Occupation: Shop Assistant; Barmaid; Secretary; Nanny
- Father: Joe McIntyre
- Mother: Ann McIntyre
- Stepmother: Gail Platt

Tina McIntyre is a fictional character from the British ITV soap opera Coronation Street. Portrayed by Michelle Keegan, the character first appeared on-screen during the episode that was shown 7 January 2008. The character was central to many key storylines relating to issues such as perjury, abortion and surrogacy, and had relationships with David Platt (Jack P. Shepherd), Graeme Proctor (Craig Gazey), Tommy Duckworth (Chris Fountain), Matt Carter (Oliver Mellor) and Jason Grimshaw (Ryan Thomas), and had an affair with married man Peter Barlow (Chris Gascoyne). Tina has also had feuds with Tracy Barlow (Kate Ford), Kylie Platt (Paula Lane) and Kirsty Soames (Natalie Gumede).

In 2010, The Guardian listed Tina as one of the 10 best Coronation Street characters of all time. In April 2013, it was announced that Keegan would be leaving the show and in October, it was announced that her character would be murdered. Tina was pushed from the balcony and beaten with a lead pipe by Rob Donovan (Marc Baylis), before dying of her injuries on 2 June 2014. Tina's funeral took place on 23 June 2014, in which she made her final appearance in video footage.

== Creation ==
=== Casting ===
Tina McIntyre was cast in the soap to portray a short-term girlfriend of character David Platt (Jack P. Shepherd), to help change his evil ways. As the character's personality was portrayed on screen, soap bosses and viewers were impressed with the character and actress Michelle Keegan which resulted in her character becoming a permanent fixture. She has worked in low-skilled jobs such as the Kabin and as a barmaid. Her main links in Coronation Street were initially with the Platt family.

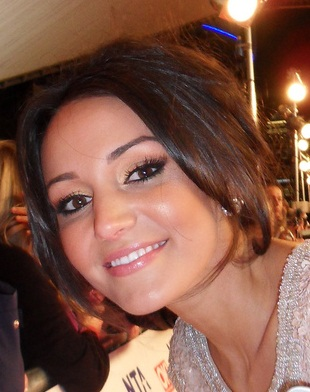
Keegan portrayed Tina from 2008 until the character's demise in 2014.

Auditions were held for the part of the character and Keegan received a call from her agent telling her she had been offered the part, the initial audition being only her second for any part. She was called to a meeting with producer Steve November, he was immediately happy with her and handed her the scripts.

In an interview with the Daily Mirror, Keegan spoke about her character's success in the show stating that: "Tina came in to the show just to change David into a nice character, and then to get to the point where he pushed his mum down the stairs. I was supposed to be out of there after that. But they’ve kept me on. They needed a bit of a ballsy character, I think. She’s moved into the Platts’ now and she’s getting a family base around her, so hopefully she’s around for the long haul. I didn’t think I was staying, so I’m very lucky".

=== Characterisation ===
Describing Tina's personality after her arrival on screen, the official ITV website states: "Tina has never felt like she’s fitted in anywhere, but she’s not a pushover by any means. She thinks she knows everything, but doesn’t and would rather be friends with lads than girls, who usually hate her. Challenge her to an arm wrestle and she’ll probably win." Also stating that she is feisty and fell into a common job rather than not being smart enough to do anything else, with Michelle saying during an interview: "She’s feisty but she’s essentially a good girl at the moment" and in another on the ITV official website saying: "She can be very feisty but she's just a normal, vulnerable, 17-year-old girl and she's very confused.".

On the teenage abortion storyline actress, Keegan (who knew about the storyline before taking the part) said: "It was such an emotional storyline to be involved in I was scared and wondered if I'd really be able to pull it off. But it's been a real challenge and good to get my teeth into something.".

== Development ==
=== Departure and death ===
On 20 April 2013, Keegan confirmed that she had quit Coronation Street. The actress stated "I have had the most amazing six years at Coronation Street and it was such a difficult decision to leave. But I felt it was the right time for me to make the next step in my career. I will miss Tina and will always be grateful to ITV and Coronation Street for giving me such an amazing role to play for my first ever acting job." Keegan added that she was excited to see what the coming months would hold for Tina, while series producer Stuart Blackburn commented that plans were being made for her "powerful and gripping" exit storyline. Keegan was planning to leave when her contract expired in November, but was persuaded to stay until May 2014.

== Storylines ==
Tina is first seen trying to book an appointment at the Medical Centre because she has tennis elbow. She bickers with Gail Platt (Helen Worth), the receptionist.

Tina starts dating Gail's son, David Platt (Jack P. Shepherd), and shortly afterwards learns that she is pregnant. Unable to tell her own parents, she confides in Gail, who is pleased to hear that she wants an abortion. Gail pays for Tina to go to a private clinic, worried that David is too unstable to be a father. When David finds out, he ends the relationship and is furious with Gail for interfering. Their argument results in Gail falling down the stairs after she tries to stop him leaving. Shocked, David visits Tina and they reconcile. Tina gives David an alibi but Gail's memory returns and she knows David was responsible but refuses to press charges. Feeling guilty and wanting to be punished, David goes on a violent rampage, smashing windows in the street and attacking Ken Barlow (William Roache). He is subsequently imprisoned. The couple reconcile when David is released and things become complicated when Gail starts dating Tina's father, Joe (Reece Dinsdale), who gives David a job.

Later in the year, David and Joe start a feud with the Windass family, who owe Joe money. In January 2009, David has a fight with Gary Windass (Mikey North) and is badly beaten. David persuades Tina to tell the police that Gary started the fight but she cannot commit perjury and tells the truth. Gary is acquitted and Tina and David split up as she is no longer able to cope with his erratic behaviour. Tina gets a job at The Kabin newsagents and develops a strong friendship with her boss Rita Sullivan (Barbara Knox).

In 2009, Tina starts dating Jason Grimshaw (Ryan Thomas) and they buy the flat above The Kabin, renovating it together, assisted by Joe. In February 2010, Gail, now married to Joe, returns from a short break in the Lake District alone, claiming that Joe got a job refitting a yacht there. Tina is worried about her father as she has not heard from him and Joe goes missing, having planned to fake his own death in a boating accident in order to use his life insurance to pay off a loan shark. Joe is later found dead and Tina is devastated, identifying her father's body. The police wrongly suspect that Gail murdered Joe and Tina starts to believes this, banning Gail from Joe's funeral. On learning that Gail is planning to go abroad, Tina tells the police and Gail is arrested and charged with murder. Tina sinks into a deep depression and ends her relationship with Jason after he proposes. David's friend, Graeme Proctor (Craig Gazey), tries to help her and when he learns Tina has stopped eating, he moves in to look after her. Gail is acquitted and eventually convinces Tina that she is innocent. Tina ends her relationship with Jason and starts dating Graeme. Jason evicts them from the flat and they initially stay with Rita, before moving into the flat above the corner shop. In September, Tina leaves her job at The Kabin after Norris Cole (Malcolm Hebden) accuses her and Graeme of credit card fraud; she gets a job as a barmaid at the Rovers Return Inn pub in December. On her first night, a gas explosion at The Joinery bar causes a tram to derail and crash on to the Street. Tina helps with the rescue effort as residents seek shelter at The Rovers.

In February 2011, during a Valentine's Day meal with Graeme, Tina discovers the waitress is an old friend, Xin Chiang (Elizabeth Tan), and sees that she is upset. Xin explains that she is struggling financially so Tina suggests that Xin move in with her and Graeme. In March, Tina and Graeme's flat, destroyed in the tram crash, is repaired and ready for them to move back into but Xin is being threatened with deportation so Tina suggests that she and Graeme get married so Xin can stay. Tina and Graeme stage a break-up and Tina moves out. Despite an investigation by the UK Border Agency, Xin gets her visa but, after twisting her ankle when she falls from a ladder, has to stay. Graeme takes the marriage seriously and subsequently falls in love with Xin. Tina is devastated when she finds out and when David's partner Kylie Turner (Paula Lane), tells Tina that she should have expected it, Tina attacks her. Tina threatens to report Graeme and Xin to the authorities but Gail persuades her not to. Before they leave, Tina tells Graeme that she could never hate him and they part on good terms.

Tommy Duckworth (Chris Fountain) later pursues Tina after she moves in with him and Tyrone Dobbs (Alan Halsall) after Dev evicts her. Tommy accepts Tina's offer of dinner, despite having arranged a date with Amber Kalirai (Nikki Patel). Tommy leaves Amber to be with Tina, claiming that Tyrone is in hospital, but Amber learns the truth and confronts him. Tina is furious and dates Dr Matt Carter (Oliver Mellor). Tina soon realizes that Matt is embarrassed that she is a barmaid after he gets her an interview at Nick's bistro; Tina throws a pint over Matt and dumps him. In March 2012, Tina tells her colleague Sean Tully (Antony Cotton) that she has feelings for Tommy, and Sean tells her that Tommy reciprocates, but Tina has doubts. They go out for the evening, but Tommy finds a list of "pros and cons" she wrote while deciding whether to go out with him and is upset to see that she describes him as immature. After an argument, they make up and move into Jason's flat together. In April, Tommy is devastated to learn that his grandfather, Geoff Horton (Dicken Ashworth), has died. Tina supports him and encourages him to go to the funeral. Afterwards, they talk about Geoff and Tina tells Tommy about Joe's death. Tommy tells Tina that Geoff would have liked her and Tina responds by saying Joe would have approved of him. The next week, Tommy's father, Terry Duckworth (Nigel Pivaro), returns to the street. Despite Terry having sold him as a baby to his maternal grandparents, Tina encourages Tommy to get to know Terry but has second thoughts when Tommy starts working with him at his new lap dancing club. When she learns Terry is in debt to Rick Neelan (Greg Wood), the loan shark her father was also in debt to when he died, Tina is outraged; Tommy tells her that he and Terry plan to burn down the club for the insurance money but Tina convinces Tommy not to do it so Terry intends to do it. When Tina tries to stop him, a struggle breaks out and Tina is knocked unconscious. She is rushed to hospital and spends three days in a coma. On regaining consciousness, she tells Tommy that Terry caused her injuries. Tommy confronts Terry, who leaves with Tommy's money but Tommy does not tell Tina, lying that he had paid Rick. Tommy is then forced by Rick to pack drugs into cars at the garage to pay off Terry's debt; when Tina finds out, she tells Tommy to stop so Rick has Tommy beaten up in front of her. He demands Tommy drive a car packed with cocaine to Amsterdam but Tina takes the drugs and informs the police. In revenge, Rick kidnaps Rita and threatens to push her into the canal if Tina does not return the merchandise, so she does. However, as he tries to leave, he is arrested. Tina dumps Tommy but they soon reconcile.

In August, Tina is stunned to learn that Tyrone's new girlfriend, Kirsty Soames (Natalie Gumede), is physically abusing him. Tina already dislikes her and when she finds him treating his injuries in the garage, she demands an explanation. When Kirsty leaves Tyrone, Tina tries to support him but unintentionally angers him by suggesting that he is better off without her. Beth Tinker (Lisa George), speculates that Kirsty left because Tina and Tyrone were having an affair. Tina tells Tommy the truth and he confronts Kirsty in front of Tyrone. Kirsty pressurises Tyrone to demand Tommy repay the money that Tyrone lent him to pay Terry's debt and he has to take two extra jobs in order to afford the repayments. In September 2012, Tommy is injured when he crashes a pizza delivery van after falling asleep at the wheel, due to exhaustion. Kirsty also convinces Jason to sell the flat to his aunt, Julie Carp (Katy Cavanagh), evicting Tommy and Tina. Kirsty and Tina then argue in The Rovers and Tina attacks her, pushing her into a table which results in a pregnant Kirsty going into labour. Tina is shunned as everyone believes she has a vendetta against Kirsty.

Tina agrees to be a surrogate for Gary and his disabled girlfriend Izzy Armstrong (Cherylee Houston), in return for payment from Izzy's father Owen (Ian Puleston-Davies). Tommy is unhappy about this but Tina insists, explaining that they need the money to pay his debts. Tina goes through with the embryo transfer, despite concerns from Rita and Tommy's opposition. Unable to cope with Tina being pregnant with Izzy and Gary's baby, Tommy ends their relationship. In January 2013, Tina helps Tyrone and Fiz run away with Tyrone and Kirsty's daughter, Ruby Soames, after Kirsty falsely accuses Tyrone of domestically abusing her. Tina feels suffocated by the Windass family as her pregnancy progresses and is shocked when Gary tries to kiss her. Outraged, she threatens to tell Izzy. Izzy's younger sister, Katy Armstrong (Georgia May Foote), finds out and tells Izzy, who confronts Gary after finding him with Tina. Tina tells Izzy what happened but goes into labour soon afterwards. Tina is rushed to hospital and gives birth to a baby boy with Tommy and Izzy present. Tommy and Tina reconcile during this time. Disgusted with Izzy's refusal to allow Gary to see the baby, Tina lets Gary into the special care baby unit but when Izzy finds him there, they argue. Worried about the baby's welfare if she gives him to Gary and Izzy, Tina reprimands them for their behaviour and throws them out. They reconcile and decide to name the baby Jake but Tina still has doubts. When the baby is strong enough to come out of the incubator, Izzy and Gary are shocked to find Tina holding him and Gary suggests Izzy should be left to bond with him. Tina tells them that she has decided to keep the baby. Izzy and Gary are outraged and she promises to repay the surrogacy money; leading to another row and Tina stops them visiting the baby. A solicitor advises them that Tina cannot be forced to sign adoption papers so Owen and Anna evict her from the flat so Tina moves in with Rita. Anna, Gary and Izzy are further angered when Tina changes the baby's name to Joe. After Gary tells Anna that there is nothing they can do to stop Tina, Anna storms into the pub and slaps her. Tina asks Tommy, Rita and Dennis if she is doing the right thing. Tommy tells Tina that he will support her regardless but she must think about how Jake will feel when he is older. Izzy and Gary reluctantly decide not to fight Tina and let her raise Jake as her child. However, after she sees Izzy say goodbye to the baby, Tina changes her mind and decides to give him to Gary and Izzy and they change his name back to Jake. Tina is devastated but Gary and Izzy let her be part of Jake's life.

There are further shocks for Tina when David tells her that Kylie and his half-brother Nick Tilsley (Ben Price), had a one-night stand on Christmas Day 2012. Tina is disgusted that David has started a vendetta against Nick and his partner, Leanne Barlow (Jane Danson). This comes to a head when David causes an accident that leaves Nick in a coma. Tina tells David that she wants nothing more to do with his problems but supports him after he has a DNA test done on Kylie's baby daughter, Lily, proving that David is her father. Kylie later becomes suspicious of David and Tina, thinking they are having an affair and she and Tina fight in The Rovers. The next day, Kylie apologises and begs Tina to tell her what is going on; Kylie later gets the truth from Nick. When Kylie throws David out, Tina offers him a place to stay, infuriating Tommy, who accuses Tina of never putting him first and leaves for the Canary Islands. A few weeks later, Tommy rings Tina and tells her he is not coming back and ends their relationship. Tina then begins feuding with Tracy Barlow (Kate Ford), after she is nasty about Tina's surrogacy and Dennis pawns Rita's engagement ring at Tracy's new shop, culminating in Tina throwing a brick through the shop window.

Tina also becomes friendly with Tracy's stepbrother, Peter Barlow (Chris Gascoyne), who warns her not to antagonise Tracy. Tina later starts babysitting Peter's son Simon (Alex Bain), taking him to and from school. When Peter rows with Rob Donovan (Marc Baylis) at the pub at his stag night, Tina calms him down. Peter tells her that his fiancée, Carla Connor (Alison King), Rob's sister, is planning their wedding and he is not sure he wants to get married. The pair almost kiss but are interrupted by Liz McDonald (Beverley Callard). Peter marries Carla and after Carla is taken to her hotel room drunk, Tina confronts Peter about the previous night and they kiss. Peter and Carla leave for their honeymoon and returns a few weeks later, telling Tina that he wants to make his marriage work. Wanting to make Peter jealous, Tina kisses Rob and they are caught by Carla. When Peter finds out, he attacks Rob. On Christmas Day 2013, a drunken Kylie antagonises Tina and Rob escorts Kylie out. Tina follows and when she insults Kylie for sleeping with Nick, Kylie punches her. Another catfight breaks out and the police arrest Kylie for assault. The following week, after Rob gives Tina a lift into Weatherfield, Tina kisses him on the cheek to say thank you. A jealous Peter witnesses this and confronts Tina and later that day, Peter and Tina sleep together but are almost caught by Roy Cropper (David Neilson). Tina later asks him to leave Carla but he refuses. After learning she has no future with Peter, Tina packs her bags and leaves Weatherfield to stay with a friend in London. Tina returns in February to collect some of her belongings before returning to London. She catches up with Carla, and they talk about Tina's kiss with Rob, unaware that Norris has overheard. When Tracy and Rob taunt Norris and Mary Taylor (Patti Clare), Norris tells Tracy about Rob and Tina's kiss. Tracy storms into The Rovers and attacks Tina but Rob pulls her off. Tracy returns home and throws Rob out. The following day, Carla invites Tina to a meal and brings Rob and Peter, intending to set Tina and Rob up for a date. Whilst they are in the Bistro, Tracy and her mother Deirdre Barlow (Anne Kirkbride) arrive and when they see Tina and Rob together it causes an argument. Tina decides to stay and gets her job at The Rovers back. On Valentine's Day, she has sex with Peter again and he gives her the keys to his flat.

Tina and Peter embark on an affair but Tina is unhappy about being Peter's "bit on the side" and gives him an ultimatum, leave Carla or end the affair. Tina confides in her new flatmate Steph Britton (Tisha Merry), claiming that "a friend" of hers is seeing a married man. Steph soon realizes that Tina is talking about herself and nearly catches them when she returns to the flat to get her mobile phone. Peter promises Tina that he will tell Carla that their marriage is over, and they can be a proper couple. However, he breaks his promise, claiming that he walked in on Carla crying and felt it was not a good time to tell her. Tina thinks he never intended to tell Carla and slaps him. However, after he starts worrying about Rob finding out, Peter agrees to run away with Tina and after packing her bags, she goes to say goodbye to Rita. She reveals that she has been having an affair with Peter, much to Rita's disgust, and they argue before Rita slaps her. Tina is heartbroken when she walks into the pub to hear Peter announcing Carla's pregnancy. Tina confronts Peter and threatens to tell Carla before scratching him on the face. After he leaves, Rob visits and begs her not to tell Carla but Tina refuses and reveals that she knows he and Tracy are selling illegal stock and threatens to report them to the police. Rob tries to convince her not to but she runs out onto the balcony of the building yard next door. As they row, Rob pushes Tina away after she tries to barge past him, and she loses her balance, plummeting onto the cobbles below. Thinking she is dead, Rob stages a burglary but as he leaves, he finds Tina is still alive. He offers to call an ambulance but she threatens to tell the police that he pushed her deliberately, wanting to kill her and tells Rob that she will tell Carla about her affair with Peter. In order to silence her, Rob picks up a nearby metal pipe and repeatedly beats her with it. Tina is later found by Carla, who has learnt of the affair from Peter, Leanne and Kal Nazir (Jimi Mistry) who call an ambulance and Tina is rushed to hospital where she has an operation to remove parts of her skull to allow room for the swelling on her brain to reduce. After initially recovering, Tina has a cardiac arrest and attempts to resuscitate her fail so they switch off her life-support machine. A doctor informs Rita, David and Steph of her death, and Rita breaks down. Rita and David visit Tina's body to say goodbye and Rita says that she will miss her for the rest of her life. Tina's funeral is held on 23 June 2014. The same day, Steph, her brother Luke (Dean Fagan) and Katy, watch a video of Tina dancing and messing around on Steph's mobile phone in reminiscence.

== Reception ==
Ian Wylie of Manchester Evening News commented on Keegan's nomination as best newcomer at The British Soap Awards 2008 and her portrayal of the character saying "Coronation Street’s Michelle Keegan is nominated as Best Newcomer, fully deserved even after just a few months on screen" and "teen rebel Tina McIntyre, played by Michelle, reminds many of a young Suranne Jones as Karen McDonald." Keegan went on to win the award, which she was voted for by a panel. One of the main reasons why Keegan was given a longer contract with the soap was because the character had impressed the viewers and bosses so much and Ian Wylie also commented on the win and big impression, an achievement because of the short amount of time the character has been on screen. Jon Wise of The People observed her as bolder than Liz McDonald's (Beverley Callard) make-up and brassier than Leanne Battersby (Jane Danson). Michelle has also been nominated at the National Television Awards for Best Newcomer. The Daily Mirror added that she had gained a notable army of fans because of her character's personality and Keegan's natural acting style. On Digital Spy's 2012 end of year reader poll, Keegan was nominated for Best Female Soap Actor, and came second, with 14.2% of the vote. Keegan won the accolade of Sexiest Female at British Soap Awards every year from 2009 to 2014.

== In popular culture ==
For the 1000th episode of The Jeremy Kyle Show, the character of Tina appeared on the show, along with David Platt and Graeme Proctor. The episode showed the fall out of the relationship in a fictional context.
