= Bolan's Shoes =

British music drama film

- Directed by: Ian Puleston-Davies
- Written by: Ian Puleston-Davies
- Produced by: Terri Dwyer; Greg Barrow; Dean Fisher
- Starring: Timothy Spall; Leanne Best
- Cinematography: Richard Swingle
- Edited by: Abi Wright; Chris Gill; Mark McKenny
- Music by: Ian Arber
- Production companies: Buffalo Dragon; Munro Film
- Release dates: 1 March 2023 (Cinequest Film Festival); 15 September 2023 (United Kingdom)
- Running time: 98 minutes
- Country: United Kingdom
- Language: English

Bolan's Shoes is a 2023 British film, written and directed by Ian Puleston-Davies, and starring Timothy Spall and Leanne Best. The film features the music of the band T. Rex. The film has a 15 September 2023 UK release date.

== Synopsis ==
Children in an orphanage in 1970s Liverpool share a fascination with the music of glam rock band T. Rex but have their lives altered by a road traffic accident.

== Cast ==
- Timothy Spall as Jimmy
- Leanne Best as Penny
- Mark Lewis Jones as Geraint
- Mathew Horne as Jez

== Production ==
The film is written and directed by Ian Puleston-Davies. Produced by Terri Dwyer, Greg Barrow, and Dean Fisher for Buffalo Dragon in association with Munro Film, with Rolan Bolan, the son of Marc Bolan, as associate producer.

=== Music ===
The film features the music of the band T. Rex.

=== Filming ===
Filming took place in Liverpool and Anglesey in July 2021. Filming was completed by September 2021.

== Release ==
The film premiered at the Cinequest Film Festival on 1 March 2023 and will be released in the UK on 15 September 2023.
