= Fake Reaction =

- Genre: Comedy panel game
- Written by: James Menzies; Christopher Davies; Phil Kerr; Dan Swimer; Simon Bullivant; Dominic English; Kevin Day; Will Ing
- Directed by: Ian Lorimer
- Presented by: Matt Edmondson
- Starring: Team captains: Ellie Taylor; Joe Swash
- Theme music composer: Dobs Vye
- Country of origin: United Kingdom
- Original language: English
- No. of series: 2
- No. of episodes: 18 (list of episodes)

Production
- Executive producer: Gary Chippington
- Producer: Tommy Panays
- Production locations: Riverside Studios (2013); BBC Elstree Centre (2014)
- Editor: Tim Ellison
- Running time: 45 minutes (inc. adverts)
- Production company: STV Studios

Original release
- Network: ITV2
- Release: 3 January 2013 – 6 March 2014

Fake Reaction is a British television comedy panel game shown on ITV2 that ran for two series from 3 January 2013 to 6 March 2014 presented by Matt Edmondson with regular team captains Joe Swash and Ellie Taylor.

== Production ==
A pilot edition was recorded in April 2012 for BBC Three, however the show was picked up by ITV2 for an eight-episode run from 3 January 2013. A second series of ten episodes began production in late 2013, and premiered on 2 January 2014.

On 3 September 2014, Edmondson revealed that the programme had been axed after two series.

== Transmissions ==
Series	Episodes	Originally released	
Series	Episodes	First released	Last released
1	8	3 January 2013	21 February 2013
2	10	2 January 2014	6 March 2014
