= Georgia May Foote =

British actress and model (born 1991)

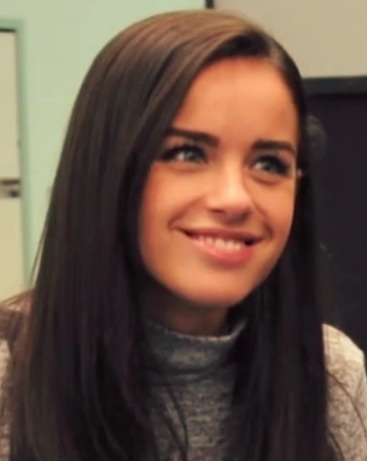
- Foote in 2015
- Born: 11 February 1991 (age 35); Bury, Greater Manchester, England
- Occupations: Actress; model
- Years active: 2004–present
- Television: Grange Hill; Coronation Street; Strictly Come Dancing; Trollied
- Height: 5 ft 1 in (1.55 m)

Georgia May Foote (born 11 February 1991) is an English actress and model. She is known for playing Alison Simmons in the BBC school drama series Grange Hill from 2005 to 2008 and Katy Armstrong in the ITV soap opera Coronation Street from 2010 to 2015. In 2015, she was a runner-up on the BBC celebrity talent show Strictly Come Dancing. She also came 98th in FHM's Sexiest Women of 2015.

== Early life ==
Foote attended Elton High School in Bury and then Bury College. She has an older sister named Katie.

== Career ==
Foote has been appearing on British television since 2004. She has played two different murder victims: Angela Fairley in the psychological thriller Conviction, and as Charley Witham in Life on Mars. Other roles are Rosie in Sorted, Katy Barnes in Doctors, Jennifer Thurber in the BBC drama Casualty (20 September 2008), Julie Tinniswood in the ITV drama Heartbeat (3 May 2009), Bryony in Emmerdale (April 2010), and Gemma in This Is England 86. She played the role of Lauren in the short film Cotton Stones. She also appeared in two domestic abuse television adverts. She made a guest appearance in Coronation Street as Jess Burrows (18 January 2010), but was re-introduced as a new, regular character in July 2010, playing Katy Armstrong. She left the show in 2015 to pursue other acting roles, interests, projects, and her modelling career. The character was killed off off-screen in early-2017, reported to have died in a car accident in Portugal, where she was living in the script.

In 2013, Foote was nominated for the Sexiest Female Award at the British Soap Awards, but lost out to fellow Coronation Street actress Michelle Keegan. In 2014, she was nominated for the same award but again lost out to Michelle Keegan who portrayed Tina McIntyre in the show. In 2015 she came 98th on FHM's 100 Sexiest Women, she featured alongside Keegan who came first, the first time two stars from the same British soap had been in the Top 100 public poll.

Foote was signed to a modelling contract with Select Model Management in October 2014. Foote has appeared as a guest and contestant on shows such as Fake Reaction, All Star Family Fortunes, BBC Breakfast, Celebrity Juice and Loose Women. She has been a self-employed nail technician since 2021.

=== Strictly Come Dancing ===
On 13 August 2015, it was announced that Foote would be participating in the thirteenth series of the BBC celebrity talent show Strictly Come Dancing from September 2015. She was partnered with professional dancer Giovanni Pernice. The couple eventually reached the final where they received the maximum 40 points for their Charleston. They ended as joint runners-up along with Kellie Bright and Kevin Clifton, losing out to Jay McGuiness and Aliona Vilani who won the competition.

Week #	Dance / Song	Judges' scores					Result
Week #	Dance / Song	Horwood	Bussell	Goodman	Tonioli	Total	Result
1	Jive / "Dear Future Husband"	6	7	7	7	27	No elimination
2	Waltz / "Georgia on My Mind"	6	6	6	7	25	Safe
3	Rumba / "Writing's on the Wall"	7	7	6	7	27	Safe
4	Quickstep / "Reach"	7	7	8	8	30	Safe
5	Salsa / "You Make Me Feel (Mighty Real)"	7	8	8	8	31	Safe
6	Tango / "Ghostbusters"	8	9	9	9	35	Safe
7	Samba / "Volare"	8	9	9	9	35	Safe
8	Charleston / "Hot Honey Rag"	9	10	10	10	39	Safe
9	American Smooth Viennese waltz / "I Have Nothing"	9	9	10	10	38	Safe
10	Paso doble / "The Final Countdown"	8	8	8	9	33	Safe
11	Foxtrot / "Beauty and the Beast"	9	9	9	9	36	Bottom two
12	Cha-cha-cha / "I Will Survive"; Viennese waltz / "Runaway"	8; 9	8; 10	8; 10	9; 10	33; 39	Safe
13	Rumba / "Writing's on the Wall"; Freestyle / "Fix You"; Charleston / "Hot Honey Rag"	9; 9; 10	9; 9; 10	9; 9; 10	9; 9; 10	36; 36; 40	Runner-up

== Filmography ==
Year	TV series	Role	Notes
2004	Conviction	Angela Fairley	3 episodes
2006	Sorted	Rosie	3 episodes
2007	Life on Mars	Charley Witham	1 episode
2007	Doctors	Katy Barnes	1 episode
2005–2008	Grange Hill	Alison Simmons	Series regular
2008	Casualty	Jennifer Thurber	1 episode
2009	Cotton Stones	Lauren	Short film
2009	Heartbeat	Julie Tinniswood	1 episode
2010	Emmerdale	Bryony Gregson	1 episode
2010	This Is England '86	Gemma	2 episodes
2010	Coronation Street	Jess Burrows	1 episode
2010–2015	Coronation Street	Katy Armstrong	Series regular 391 episodes
2012, 2013	Loose Women	Herself	Guest panellist: 2 episodes
2013	All Star Family Fortunes	Herself	Contestant/panelist
2013, 2016	Celebrity Juice	Herself	Contestant/panelist
2014	Fake Reaction	Herself	Contestant/panelist
2015	Strictly Come Dancing	Herself	Contestant/panelist
2015	Strictly Come Dancing: It Takes Two	Herself	Contestant/panelist
2016	Saturday Kitchen	Herself	1 episode
2016	Trollied	Holly	4 episodes
2019	Queen of Diamonds	Kitty	Short Film
2020	Doctors	Gracie Bradshaw	Episode: "A Day in the Life..."
2020–2021	The Outpost	Falista	14 Episodes
2022	We Are Not Alone	Elodie	TV movie
2024	Eat, Love, London	Stella Martin	TV movie
2024	IC9	Kayla Kane	Short Film

Theatre

Year	Title	Role	Venue
2016	Breakfast at Tiffany's	Holly Golightly	Milton Keynes Theatre
2025	Cinderella	Cinderella	Norwich Theatre Circuit
2027	To Sir, with Love	Pamela Dare	Grand Theatre, Leeds

== Awards and nominations ==
Year	Award	Category	Result	Ref.
2011	TV Choice Awards	Best Soap Newcomer	Nominated	
2013	British Soap Awards	Sexiest Female	Shortlisted	
2013	Inside Soap Awards	Sexiest Female	Nominated	
2014	2014 British Soap Awards	Sexiest Female	Shortlisted	
2014	Inside Soap Awards	Sexiest Female	Shortlisted	
