= Ian Puleston-Davies =

Welsh actor (born 1959/60)

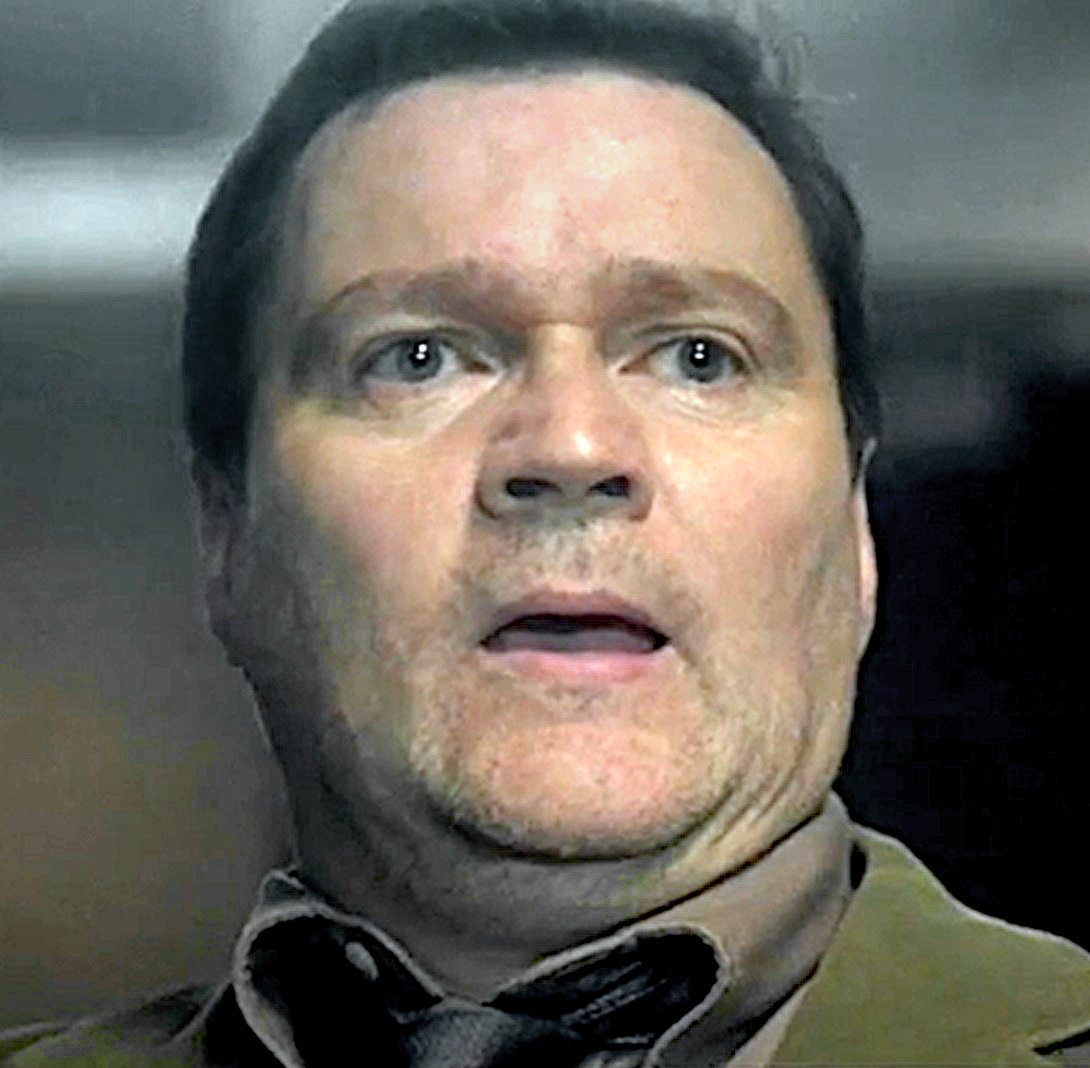
- Puleston-Davies in Midnight Man (2008)
- Born: 1959 or 1960 (age 66–67); Flint, Flintshire, Wales
- Occupation: Actor
- Years active: 1982–present
- Television: Coronation Street (2010–2015); Waterloo Road (2010); Ben & Holly's Little Kingdom (2009–2014); Hollyoaks (1995–1996)
- Children: 2

Ian Puleston-Davies (born 1959 or 1960) is a Welsh actor. He is best known for his role as builder Owen Armstrong in the ITV soap opera Coronation Street from 2010 to 2015.

== Career ==
Puleston-Davies starred in the ITV drama Vincent alongside Ray Winstone and in Ghostboat (also for ITV) alongside David Jason.

Puleston-Davies has starred in long-running dramas such as EastEnders, Holby City, The Bill, Hollyoaks and Brookside. He has also made special appearances in Hustle, Life on Mars, Dalziel and Pascoe, Silent Witness and I'm Alan Partridge.

In 2008, Puleston-Davies was chosen to play the voiceover part of King Thistle in the children's animated television series Ben & Holly's Little Kingdom.

From September to October 2010, he played the role of Charlie Fisher in the sixth series of the BBC One drama, Waterloo Road.

In 2010, Puleston-Davies joined Coronation Street as cast regular Owen Armstrong. His departure from the show was announced in November 2014.

In 2005, he co-wrote the drama Dirty Filthy Love, based upon his own experiences dealing with obsessive–compulsive disorder. Dirty Filthy Love won a Royal Television Society Award for Best Single Drama and was nominated for the BAFTA Award for "Best Single Drama".

In January 2022, Puleston-Davies starred in The Teacher alongside Sheridan Smith. In 2023, he played the role of Cary Grant's mentor, Bob Pender, in the TV miniseries Archie, about the life of the film star.

In 2023, Puleston-Davies made his feature-length directorial debut with Bolan's Shoes, which premiered at the Manchester Film Festival, where it won the Audience Award for Best Feature Film.

== Personal life ==
In 2014, Puleston-Davies was living in Edgworth, Lancashire, with his partner, Sue, and their two children.

He is the cousin of former World Champion kickboxer, Russ Williams.

Puleston-Davies has spoken at length about his personal struggles with obsessive–compulsive disorder, which had only been diagnosed in 1995, despite symptoms having been apparent since childhood.

== Filmography ==
=== Film ===
| Year | Title | Role | Notes |
|---|---|---|---|
| 1987 | Business as Usual | Young Workman | |
| 1999 | Tube Tales | Typewriter Man | Segment: "Rosebud" |
| 2000 | Room to Rent | Linda's Husband | |
| 2001 | The Last Minute | Bitchy Trendsetter 1 | |
| 2003 | The Virgin of Liverpool | Cecil | |
| 2005 | Revolver | Eddie A | |
| 2006 | Hunter | (unknown) | Short films |
| 2008 | Backroads | Frank | Short films |
| 2009 | Awaydays | Uncle Bob | |
| 2010 | Poor Wee Me | Man of Cloth | |
| 2013 | The Caravan Trilogy | The Man | Short films |
| 2015 | Pombo Loves You | Griff | Short films |
| 2015 | I'm Sorry to Tell You | Dr. Burgess | Short films |
| 2016 | Taubman | Mr. Phillips | Short films |
| 2018 | Fighter from the Docks | Dave | |
| 2018 | Winterlong | Paul Castle | |
| 2023 | Bolan's Shoes | Radio DJ | Uncredited role; also writer and director |
| TBA | Madfabulous | Mr. Davies | Post-production |

=== Television ===
| Year | Title | Role | Notes |
|---|---|---|---|
| 1983 | The Second Part of King Henry VI | Second Company | Television films |
| 1983 | The Third Part of King Henry VI | Second Company | Television films |
| 1986 | Boon | Ben Wilde | Episode: "Unto Us Four a Son" |
| 1986 | Brookside | Stephen Nolan | Episode: "Persistence" |
| 1989 | Forever Green | Reporter | Series 1; Episode 5 |
| 1992 | The Old Devils | Young Charlie | Mini-series; Episodes 1 & 3 |
| 1994 | The Bill | Frank Talbot | Series 10; Episode 154: "Dearly Departed" |
| 1995 | Grange Hill | Don | Series 18; Episode 17 |
| 1995 | The Politician's Wife | Youth Programme Host | Mini-series; Episodes 1–3 |
| 1995–1996 | Hollyoaks | Terry Williams | Main role; 23 episodes |
| 1996 | Harpur and Iles | Rick the Intelligent | Television film |
| 1998 | Animated World Faiths | Vashpa / Channa (voice) | Episodes 5 & 6: "The Life of the Buddha" and "The Way of the Buddha" |
| 1998 | EastEnders | Jimmy | 9 episodes |
| 1998 | Satellite City | Don Blackmore | Series 3; Episode 1: "Fear and Trembling" |
| 1999 | The Ruth Rendell Mysteries | PC Carter | Series 11; Episode 10: "The Fallen Curtain" |
| 1999 | Jack of Hearts | Derek Reid | Episodes 1 & 4 |
| 1999 | Liverpool 1 | Connor | Series 2; Episode 5: "A Rush of Blood to the Head" |
| 1999 | Dr Willoughby | Steven Lipton | Episodes 1 & 3: "Fan Mail" and "Family Wedding" |
| 1999–2000 | The Bill | Mick Glover | Series 15 & 16; 5 episodes |
| 2000 | Dirty Work | Daniel Meredith | Episode: "You've Gotta Have Heart" |
| 2000 | Always and Everyone | Ian Boyd | Series 2; Episode 4 |
| 2000 | Holby City | Sam Dennish | Series 3; Episode 10: "Anyone Who Had a Heart" |
| 2001 | The Vice | George Randolph | Series 3; Episode 3: "Force of Nature" |
| 2001 | My Beautiful Son | Derek | Television film |
| 2002 | Rockface | Billy Deansgate | Episodes 5 & 6 |
| 2002 | Helen West | Duncan Perry | Episode: "Deep Sleep" |
| 2002 | Stan the Man | Moxy | Comedy drama series |
| 2002 | Foyle's War | Eric Cooper | Episode: "A Lesson in Murder" |
| 2002 | I'm Alan Partridge | Phil Wiley | Series 2; Episode 1: "The Talented Mr. Alan" |
| 2003 | The Bill | Alan Best | Series 19; 5 episodes |
| 2004 | Wall of Silence | DI Matthews | Television film |
| 2004 | Dalziel and Pascoe | Paul Pitman | Series 8; Episode 3: "Great Escapes" |
| 2004 | Conviction | Joe Payne | Mini-series; Episodes 1–6 |
| 2005 | Funland | Shirley Woolf | Mini-series; Episodes 1–11 |
| 2005–2006 | Vincent | John | Series 1 & 2; 7 episodes |
| 2006 | Ghostboat | Travis | Television film |
| 2006 | Hustle | DCI Matthew York | Series 3; Episode 6: "Law and Corruption" |
| 2006 | Life on Mars | Toolbox Terry | Series 2; Episode 6 |
| 2007 | Silent Witness | DI Philip Mays | Series 11; Episodes 9 & 10: "Peripheral Vision: Parts 1 & 2" |
| 2007 | Sound | Strange Pete | Television film |
| 2007 | City Lights | Pete | Series 1; Episode 4 |
| 2007 | Cape Wrath | Paulson | Series 1; Episode 8 |
| 2007 | Richard Is My Boyfriend | Steve | Television film |
| 2007 | The Whistleblowers | Lance Rix | Episode: "Environment" |
| 2007 | Sold | Terry | Series 1; Episode 5 |
| 2008 | Terry Pratchett's The Colour of Magic | Wizard Leader | 2-part mini-series; Episode: "Part 1: The Colour of Magic" |
| 2008 | Waking the Dead | Harold Bloom | Series 7; Episodes 9 & 10: "Wounds: Parts 1 & 2" |
| 2008 | Midnight Man | Jimmy Kerrigan | Mini-series; Episodes 1–3: "Parts 1–3" |
| 2008 | The Children | Paul | Mini-series; Episodes 1–3 |
| 2008 | Tess of the D'Urbervilles | John Durbeyfield | Mini-series; Episodes 1–4 |
| 2008 | Clash of the Santas | Beryl | Television film |
| 2009 | The Street | Alan | Series 3; Episode 3: "Scar" |
| 2009 | Desperate Romantics | Mr. Siddal | Mini-series; 5 episodes |
| 2009 | Ingenious | Derek Reckitt | Television film |
| 2009–2013 | Ben & Holly's Little Kingdom | King Thistle / Mr. Big (voice) | Series 1 & 2; 54 episodes |
| 2010 | Being Human | Chief Constable Wilson | Series 2; Episodes 3 & 5: "Long Live the King" and "The Looking Glass" |
| 2010 | Midsomer Murders | Terry Stock | Series 13; Episode 5: "Master Class" |
| 2010 | Waterloo Road | Charlie Fisher | Series 6; 9 episodes |
| 2010–2015 | Coronation Street | Owen Armstrong | Main role, 542 episodes |
| 2012 | Coronation Street: A Christmas Corrie | Owen Armstrong | Television short film on behalf of Text Santa |
| 2015 | Lewis | Frank Guitteau | Series 9; Episodes 5 & 6: "What Lies Tangled: Parts 1 & 2" |
| 2016 | Beowulf: Return to the Shieldlands | Lagrathorn | 5 episodes |
| 2016 | Marcella | Peter Cullen | 6 episodes |
| 2016 | Reg | Second Voter | Television film |
| 2016 | National Treasure | Leo | 4-part mini-series; Episode 3 |
| 2016 | Maigret | Inspector Colombani | Episode: "Maigret's Dead Man" |
| 2017–2020 | Tin Star | Frank Jackson | Series 1–3; 15 episodes |
| 2018 | Vera | Sean Dewley | Series 8; Episode 4: "Darkwater" |
| 2019 | Moving On | Peter | Series 10; Episode 4: "A Walk in My Shoes" |
| 2019 | Hatton Garden | Ray Bilton | Mini-series; Episodes 1–3 |
| 2019 | A Confession | Mick O'Callaghan | Mini-series; Episodes 1–6 |
| 2019–2021 | Pennyworth | Arthur Pennyworth | Series 1 & 2; 16 episodes |
| 2020 | Father Brown | Pat Lochlin | Series 8; Episode 7: "The River Corrupted" |
| 2020 | The A Word | Doug | Series 3; Episode 5 |
| 2021 | Viewpoint | Donald Vernon | Mini-series; Episodes 1 & 3 |
| 2022 | Four Lives | Karl Turner MP | Mini-series; Episode 1 |
| 2022 | Anne | Professor Phil Scraton | Mini-series; Episode 4 |
| 2022 | The Teacher | Brian | Mini-series; Episodes 3 & 4 |
| 2022 | Agatha Raisin | Brian Jankers | Series 4; Episode 2: "Love, Lies and Liquor" |
| 2022 | Silent Witness | DSU Ronnie Boyle | Series 25; 4 episodes: "History - Parts One, Two, Five & Six" |
| 2022 | Henry House | Sam Cartwright | Pilot episode |
| 2022–2024 | D.I. Ray | Supt. Ross Beardsmore | Series 1 & 2; 9 episodes |
| 2023 | The Bay | Terry McGregor | Series 4; 5 episodes |
| 2023 | Archie | Pender | Mini-series; Episode 1 |
| 2024 | The Responder | Eric | Series 2; Episodes 1–5 |
| 2025 | The One That Got Away | Paul Harvey | Original title: Cleddau. Episodes 1–6 |
| 2025 | Bariau | Hugh | Series 2; Episodes 2, 4 & 5 |
| 2025 | Suspect: The Shooting of Jean Charles de Menezes | Charles Clarke | Mini-series; Episodes 1 & 2: "The Terror" and "The Hunt" |
| 2025 | Daddy Issues | Hal Ford | Series 2; Episode 4: "We Don't Like Sigmas" |

=== Stage ===
- The Mill on the Floss (1994) (Shared Experience)
- Charley's Aunt (1994) (The Royal Exchange Theatre)
- She Stoops to Conquer (1995) (Bristol Old Vic)
- A Passionate Woman (1995) (The Comedy Theatre)
- Lebenstraum (1998) (The King's Head)
- Everyone Loves a Winner (2009) (The Royal Exchange Theatre)
