= Cherylee Houston =

British actress (born 1974)

Cherylee Houston MBE
- Born: Cherylee Anne Houston; 20 August 1974 (age 52); Morecambe, Lancashire, England
- Education: Arden School of Theatre
- Occupation: Actress
- Years active: 2001–present
- Spouse: Toby Hadoke

Cherylee Martina Houston (born 20 August 1974) is a British actress. She grew up in Morecambe, Lancashire, in the United Kingdom. She plays Izzy Armstrong in Coronation Street, a role she has portrayed since April 2010. She also plays Maz in the ongoing BBC Radio 4 series Tinsel Girl.

== Early life ==
Houston's parents, Bill and Coral, ran their own photography business. She has two older brothers Lee and Vincent. As a teenager she began appearing in school plays, performed as part of Lancaster Youth Theatre and later trained at the Arden School of Theatre in Manchester. It was only after she graduated at 23 that she was diagnosed with the connective tissue disorder Hypermobile Ehlers–Danlos syndrome (hEDS).

== Career ==
In 2001 she landed a part in the daytime TV soap Doctors, playing a girl with multiple sclerosis. More TV work followed, including appearances in The Bill, Holby City, Emmerdale and the cult comedy series Little Britain, where she played the girlfriend of wheelchair-user Andy Pipkin, played by Matt Lucas. In 2006 she was one of the main characters in the BBC3 comedy I'm with Stupid playing Dorothy. In 2010 she landed the part of Izzy Armstrong in Coronation Street.

From 2015 she has played Maz in the BBC Radio 4 drama series Tinsel Girl. There have been three week-long series: TG and the Tropical Island, where she has to fundraise to get to a friend's wedding in the Seychelles; TG and the Reunion, where she falls out with a long-time friend after discovering that she was asked to be-friend her at uni because she was disabled; and TG and the Support Worker where Maz comes to terms with needing and hiring a support worker/ carer whilst keeping her part-time job at a theatre box office. There has also been a one-off 45-minute drama featuring Maz at a chronic pain clinic, first broadcast 30 August 2019. All of these were written by Lou Ramsden and produced by Charlotte Riches. They are partially based on incidents in Cherylee's life. Maz shares her diagnosis of EDS, dislocations and chronic pain.

Houston was appointed Member of the Order of the British Empire (MBE) in the 2022 New Year Honours for services to drama and to people with disabilities, and has been cited as being fundamental in the arrangement of auditions for disabled actors for Coronation Street and Emmerdale. As part of her work she is involved with Disabled Artists Networking Community (DANC) where she helps disabled artists.

== Personal life ==
Houston lives with her husband, comedian and writer Toby Hadoke, and their dog Bernard.
