= Mikey North =

English actor

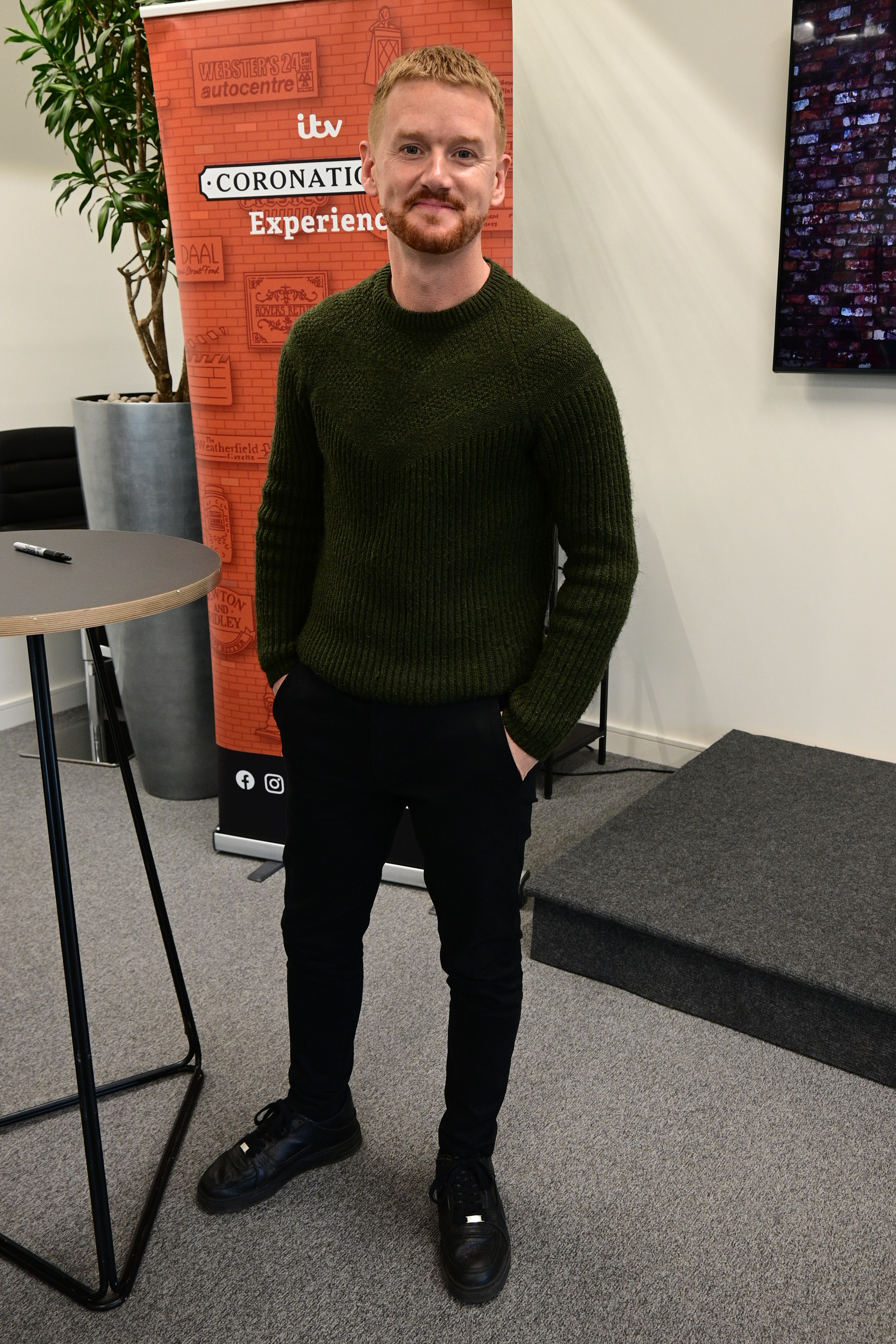
- North in 2026
- Born: Michael North; 27 September 1986 (age 39); Cayton, North Yorkshire, England
- Occupation: Actor
- Years active: 2005–present
- Spouse: Rachael Isherwood (m. 2016)
- Children: 2

Michael North (born 27 September 1986) is an English actor best known for his roles as Helmsley in Waterloo Road and Gary Windass in the ITV soap opera Coronation Street since 2008.

== Early life ==
North was born in the Cayton area of Scarborough and began acting at the age of twelve in productions locally around the town. He was noticed by an agent at the age of eighteen whilst acting in a play at Scarborough Sixth Form College.

== Career ==
North's first professional work was in the play 'Bottle Universe' in London's West End, which won him the British Theatre Guide's award for the most promising newcomer. He also had small roles in The Bill, Britannia High, Waterloo Road and The Revenge Files of Alistair Fury, before landing the role of Gary, the son of the troublesome Windass family, in Coronation Street in 2008.

== Personal life ==
North married Rachael Isherwood in 2016. They have two children.

== Filmography ==
Year	Title	Role	Notes
2006	The Bill	Scott Gibbs	Episode 386: "Breaking Point"
2006	A Mind of Her Own	Boy in Club	
2006	The Chase	Mr Taylor	Series 1 Episode 7
2006	Doctors	Tommy Watson	Episode: "Baggage"
2007	The Mark of Cain	Ginger Recruit	
2007	Waterloo Road	Helmsley	4 episodes
2008	The Revenge Files of Alistair Fury	Travis	Episode: "Technology Bytes"
2008	The Royal Today	Nathan Morton	Series 1 Episode 23
2008	Place of Execution	Charlie Lomas	3 episodes
2008	Britannia High	White Noise	Episode: "Go Your Own Way"
2008–present	Coronation Street	Gary Windass	1,236 episodes
2017	CelebAbility	Himself	
2018	All Star Driving School	Himself	5 episodes

== Awards and nominations ==
Year	Award	Category	Result	Ref.
2009	The British Soap Awards	Villain of the Year	Nominated	
2017	Inside Soap Awards	Sexiest Male	Nominated	
2018	23rd National Television Awards	Serial Drama Performance	Nominated	
2019	TV Choice Awards	Best Soap Actor	Nominated	
2019	Inside Soap Awards	Best Actor	Nominated	
2019	Inside Soap Awards	Best Bad Boy	Shortlisted	
2020	25th National Television Awards	Serial Drama Performance	Nominated	
2020	Inside Soap Awards	Best Villain	Nominated	
2022	Inside Soap Awards	Best Actor	Longlisted	
