= List of Coronation Street characters =

Coronation Street is a British television soap opera first broadcast on ITV on 9 December 1960. The following is a list of characters who are currently appearing in the programme, listed in order of first appearance. In the case that more than one actor has portrayed a character, the current actor portraying the character is listed last.

== Present characters ==
=== Regular characters ===
Character	Actor(s)	Character duration	Ref.
Ken Barlow	William Roache	1960–present	
Rita Tanner	Barbara Knox	1964, 1972–present	
Tracy Barlow	Christabel Finch	1977–1983, 1985–1997, 1999, 2002–2007, 2010–present	
Tracy Barlow	Holly Chamarette	1977–1983, 1985–1997, 1999, 2002–2007, 2010–present	
Tracy Barlow	Dawn Acton	1977–1983, 1985–1997, 1999, 2002–2007, 2010–present	
Tracy Barlow	Kate Ford	1977–1983, 1985–1997, 1999, 2002–2007, 2010–present	
Nick Tilsley	Warren Jackson	1981–1999, 2002–2004, 2009–present	
Nick Tilsley	Adam Rickitt	1981–1999, 2002–2004, 2009–present	
Nick Tilsley	Ben Price	1981–1999, 2002–2004, 2009–present	
Kevin Webster	Michael Le Vell	1983–present	
Debbie Webster	Sue Devaney	1984–1985, 2019–2027	
Sally Webster	Sally Dynevor	1986–present	
Sarah Platt	Leah King	1987–2008, 2015–present	
Sarah Platt	Lynsay King	1987–2008, 2015–present	
Sarah Platt	Tina O'Brien	1987–2008, 2015–present	
Steve McDonald	Simon Gregson	1989–present	
David Platt	Thomas Ormson	1990–present	
David Platt	Jack P. Shepherd	1990–present	
Daniel Osbourne	Lewis Harney	1995–1997, 2007, 2016–present	
Daniel Osbourne	Dominic Holmes	1995–1997, 2007, 2016–present	
Daniel Osbourne	Rob Mallard	1995–1997, 2007, 2016–present	
Roy Cropper	David Neilson	1995–present	
Leanne Battersby	Jane Danson	1997–2000, 2004–present	
Toyah Battersby	Georgia Taylor	1997–2003, 2016–present	
Tyrone Dobbs	Alan Halsall	1998–present	
Dev Alahan	Jimmi Harkishin	1999–present	
Maria Connor	Samia Longchambon	2000–present	
Kirk Sutherland	Andy Whyment	2000–present	
Bethany Platt	Mia Cookson	2000–2007, 2015–2020, 2023–present	
Bethany Platt	Amy Walton	2000–2007, 2015–2020, 2023–present	
Bethany Platt	Emily Walton	2000–2007, 2015–2020, 2023–present	
Bethany Platt	Lucy Fallon	2000–2007, 2015–2020, 2023–present	
Todd Grimshaw	Bruno Langley	2001–2004, 2007, 2011, 2013–2017, 2020–present	
Todd Grimshaw	Gareth Pierce	2001–2004, 2007, 2011, 2013–2017, 2020–present	
Adam Barlow	Iain De Caestecker	2001–2007, 2016–present	
Adam Barlow	Sam Robertson	2001–2007, 2016–present	
Fiz Brown	Jennie McAlpine	2001–present	
Sean Tully	Antony Cotton	2003–present	
Chesney Brown	Sam Aston	2003–present	
Amy Barlow	Holly Bowyer	2004–present	
Amy Barlow	Rebecca Pike	2004–present	
Amy Barlow	Louisa Morris	2004–present	
Amy Barlow	Rachel Corker	2004–present	
Amy Barlow	Sarah Corker	2004–present	
Amy Barlow	Madison Hampson	2004–present	
Amy Barlow	Amber Chadwick	2004–present	
Amy Barlow	Elle Mulvaney	2004–present	
Asha Alahan	Hannah Ahmed	2006, 2009–present	
Asha Alahan	Harris Ahmed	2006, 2009–present	
Asha Alahan	Ria Ahmed	2006, 2009–present	
Asha Alahan	Tanisha Gorey	2006, 2009–present	
Ryan Connor	Ben Thompson	2006–2010, 2012–2013, 2018–present	
Ryan Connor	Sol Heras	2006–2010, 2012–2013, 2018–present	
Ryan Connor	Ryan Prescott	2006–2010, 2012–2013, 2018–present	
Carla Connor	Alison King	2006–present	
Dylan Wilson	Charlie Corry	2008, 2011–2012, 2020–present	
Dylan Wilson	Grace Robinson	2008, 2011–2012, 2020–present	
Dylan Wilson	Connor McCheyne	2008, 2011–2012, 2020–present	
Dylan Wilson	Liam McCheyne	2008, 2011–2012, 2020–present	
Gary Windass	Mikey North	2008–present	
Mary Taylor	Patti Clare	2008–present	
Liam Connor Jr.	Imogen Moore	2009–present	
Liam Connor Jr.	Logan Blake Pearson	2009–present	
Liam Connor Jr.	Elliott Barnett	2009–present	
Liam Connor Jr.	Ollie Barnett	2009–present	
Liam Connor Jr.	Charlie Wrenshall	2009–present	
Brian Packham	Peter Gunn	2010–2013, 2015–present	
Izzy Armstrong	Cherylee Houston	2010–present	
Eva Price	Catherine Tyldesley	2011–2018, 2025–present	
Tim Metcalfe	Joe Duttine	2013–present	
Alya Nazir	Sair Khan	2014–present	
Gemma Winter	Dolly-Rose Campbell	2014–present	
Alex Warner	Liam Bairstow	2015–present	
Shona Platt	Julia Goulding	2016–present	
Summer Spellman	Matilda Freeman	2017–present	
Summer Spellman	Harriet Bibby	2017–present	
Abi Webster	Sally Carman	2017–present	
James Bailey	Nathan Graham	2019–2022, 2025–present	
James Bailey	Jason Callender	2019–2022, 2025–present	
Ed Bailey	Trevor Michael Georges	2019–present	
Michael Bailey	Ryan Russell	2019–present	
Bernie Winter	Jane Hazlegrove	2019–present	
George Shuttleworth	Tony Maudsley	2020–present	
Ronnie Bailey	Vinta Morgan	2021–present	
Lisa Swain	Vicky Myers	2021–present	
Glenda Shuttleworth	Jodie Prenger	2022–present	
Lauren Bolton	Cait Fitton	2022–present	
Christina Boyd	Amy Robbins	2023–present	
Kit Green	Jacob Roberts	2024–present	
Betsy Swain	Sydney Martin	2024–present	
Brody Michaelis	Ryan Mulvey	2025–present	
Carl Webster	Jonathan Howard	2025–present	
Ollie Driscoll	Raphael Akuwudike	2025–present	
Ben Driscoll	Aaron McCusker	2025–present	
Maggie Driscoll	Pauline McLynn	2025–present	
Will Driscoll	Lucas Hodgson-Wale	2025–present	
Jodie Ramsey	Olivia Frances-Brown	2026–present	
Idris Nazir	Junade Khan	2026–present	
Ross Wilkes	Ian Burfield	2026–present	
Lucy Parkinson	Anya Dewin	2026–present	
Marco Rhodes	William Teasdale	2026–present	

=== Recurring and guest characters ===
Character	Actor(s)	Character duration	Ref.
Jack Webster	Alex Williamson	2010–present	
Jack Webster	Ellis Williamson	2010–present	
Jack Webster	Jaxon Beswick	2010–present	
Jack Webster	Maddox Beswick	2010–present	
Jack Webster	Kyran Bowes	2010–present	
Hope Dobbs	Harriet Atkins	2010–present	
Hope Dobbs	Sadie Pilbury	2010–present	
Hope Dobbs	Ava McCulloch	2010–present	
Hope Dobbs	Isla McCulloch	2010–present	
Hope Dobbs	Faith Holt	2010–present	
Hope Dobbs	Nicole Holt	2010–present	
Hope Dobbs	Isabella Flanagan	2010–present	
Joseph Brown	Ronny Cheetham	2011–2015, 2017–present	
Joseph Brown	Tommy Cheetham	2011–2015, 2017–present	
Joseph Brown	Lucca-Owen Warwick	2011–2015, 2017–present	
Joseph Brown	William Flanagan	2011–2015, 2017–present	
Ruby Dobbs	Grace Hanrahan	2012–present	
Ruby Dobbs	Macy Alabi	2012–present	
Ruby Dobbs	Billie Naylor	2012–present	
Jake Windass	Harley Phoenix	2013–2019, 2021–present	
Jake Windass	Layton Phoenix	2013–2019, 2021–present	
Jake Windass	Seth Wild	2013–2019, 2021–present	
Jake Windass	Theo Wild	2013–2019, 2021–present	
Jake Windass	Bobby Bradshaw	2013–2019, 2021–present	
Lily Platt	Ava Bushell	2013–present	
Lily Platt	Lily Bushell	2013–present	
Lily Platt	Betsie Taylor	2013–present	
Lily Platt	Emmie Taylor	2013–present	
Lily Platt	Brooke Malonie	2013–present	
Lily Platt	Grace Ashcroft-Gardner	2013–present	
Dr. Susan Gaddas	Christine Mackie	2014–present	
Harry Platt	Woody Illsley	2016–present	
Harry Platt	Pixie Sellars	2016–present	
Harry Platt	Presley Sellars	2016–present	
Harry Platt	Freddie Rhodes	2016–present	
Harry Platt	Isaac Rhodes	2016–present	
Harry Platt	Carter-J Murphy	2016–present	
Harry Platt	Joshua Leavy	2016–present	
PC Jess Heywood	Donnaleigh Bailey	2017–2018, 2021–2023, 2025–present	
Susie Price	Lexi Kingsberry-Jones	2018, 2025–present	
Susie Price	Liberty Kingsberry-Jones	2018, 2025–present	
Susie Price	Edison Manning	2018, 2025–present	
Susie Price	Isaac Manning	2018, 2025–present	
Susie Price	Aurora Bradshaw	2018, 2025–present	
Bertie Osbourne	Ellis Blain	2019–present	
Bertie Osbourne	Eli Morgan-Smith	2019–present	
Bertie Osbourne	Rufus Morgan-Smith	2019–present	
Bertie Osbourne	Henry Duggan	2019–present	
Aled Winter-Brown	James Holt	2019–present	
Aled Winter-Brown	Arthur Taylor	2019–present	
Aled Winter-Brown	Joseph Woods	2019–present	
Bryn Winter-Brown	Arthur Taylor	2019–2020, 2022–present	
Bryn Winter-Brown	James Holt	2019–2020, 2022–present	
Carys Winter-Brown	Charlotte Holt	2019–2020, 2022–present	
Llio Winter-Brown	Lily Taylor	2019–2020, 2022–present	
Llio Winter-Brown	Lucy Taylor	2019–2020, 2022–present	
Sam Blakeman	Jude Riordan	2020–present	
Glory Bailey	Kamiyah Brown	2021–present	
Glory Bailey	Eleanor Beckles	2021–present	
Glory Bailey	Mayia Manderson-Olayemi	2021–present	
Alfie Franklin	Carter Razak Townsend	2022–present	
Alfie Franklin	Oakley Razak Townsend	2022–present	
Frankie Bolton	Roman Thresh	2024–present	
Dorin Pop	Henry Meller	2024–present	
Joanie Michaelis	Savanna Pennington	2025–present	
Shanice Michaelis	Molly Kilduff	2025–present	
Harper Platt	Bella and Betsy	2026–present	
Doug Ramsey	Steve Evets	2026–present	
Richie Parkinson	Nathan Sussex	2026–present	

== Cast changes ==
=== Departing characters ===
Character	Actor	Ref.
Debbie Webster	Sue Devaney	

=== Returning characters ===
Character	Actor	Ref.
Owen Armstrong	Ian Puleston-Davies	
Megan Walsh	Beth Nixon	

== Lists of characters by year of introduction ==
- 1960
- 1961
- 1962
- 1963
- 1964
- 1965
- 1966
- 1967
- 1968
- 1969
- 1970
- 1971
- 1972
- 1973
- 1974
- 1975
- 1976
- 1977
- 1978
- 1979
- 1980
- 1981
- 1982
- 1983
- 1984
- 1985
- 1986
- 1987
- 1988
- 1989
- 1990
- 1991
- 1992
- 1993
- 1994
- 1995
- 1996
- 1997
- 1998
- 1999
- 2000
- 2001
- 2002
- 2003
- 2004
- 2005
- 2006
- 2007
- 2008
- 2009
- 2010
- 2011
- 2012
- 2013
- 2014
- 2015
- 2016
- 2017
- 2018
- 2019
- 2020
- 2021
- 2022
- 2023
- 2024
- 2025
- 2026
