= List of Coronation Street characters introduced in 2026 =

Coronation Street is a British soap opera first broadcast on ITV on 9 December 1960. This is a list of characters that will make their first appearance in 2026. In January, the first character to appear in 2026 is Shona Platt's (Julia Goulding) estranged half-sister Jodie Ramsey, played by actress and singer, Olivia Frances-Brown. She was followed by surgeon Vincent Harper, and Harper Platt, the newborn daughter of Shona and David Platt (Jack P. Shepherd). Later in January, Lee, a former pupil of Megan Walsh (Beth Nixon) and Mal Roper, who began stalking Bernie Winter (Jane Hazlegrove) debuted. In February, Doug Ramsey, the father of Jodie and Shona Platt (Julia Goulding) appeared, followed by Paula, an inmate of Debbie Webster (Sue Devaney) and Connie Waring, the baby daughter of Rob Donovan (Mark Bayliss) and Mandy Waring (Rebecca Atkinson), who was temporarily left in the care of Carla Connor (Alison King) and Lisa Swain (Vicky Myers). In April, Melanie Driscoll the ex-wife of Ben Driscoll (Aaron McCusker) and mother of Ollie Driscoll (Raphael Akuwudike) and Will Driscoll (Lucas Hodgson-Wale) first appeared. Damo made his appearance in May, followed by Idris Nazir, the cousin of Alya Nazir (Sair Khan). Ross, the biological father of Tyrone Dobbs (Alan Halsall) is set to debut later in the year. Additionally, several other characters appear throughout the year.

== Jodie Ramsey ==
Jodie Ramsey
- Coronation Street character
- Portrayed by: Olivia Frances-Brown
- Duration: 2026–present
- First appearance: Corriedale; 5 January 2026
- Introduced by: Kate Brooks
- Crossover appearances: Corriedale (2026)
In-universe information
- Father: Doug Ramsey
- Half-sisters: Shona Platt
- Nephews: Clayton Hibbs
- Nieces: Harper Platt

Jodie Ramsey, portrayed by Olivia Frances-Brown, made her first appearance on 5 January 2026 in the special hour-long Corriedale crossover episode, where Coronation Street and fellow ITV1 soap Emmerdale crossover. Her casting was announced on 16 December 2025 when the full cast for the special episode was announced. Her character was listed under the Coronation Street cast of the episode, but few details were revealed about her character, which caused fans to speculate who Jodie could be. When she first appeared in Corriedale, she was seen to be tied up and held hostage in the back of Graham Foster's (Andrew Scarborough) van. She managed to escape and ran into the woods where Kit Green (Jacob Roberts) called out for her, which caused her to turn around and lose her footing under a tree. After Kit inspected the cable ties around her hands, it revealed that she had a matching tattoo to Shona Platt (Julia Goulding). After Shona gave birth to a daughter Harper via caesarean section, Jodie peered through the blinds in the ICU unit. A nurse passing by asked if she was a mother to one of the babies in the ICU, which she responded that she was an aunt.

Maisie Spackman from Metro spoke about Jodie's identity: "Given that she and Shona have matching tattoos, it’s safe to assume that she is her sister – unless Gail [portrayed by Helen Worth] has another secret child no one’s told us about!" She continued: "Fans have already picked up on the resemblance between Jodie and Shona, and the fact that Shona had previously mentioned having a sister."

== Vincent Harper ==
Vincent Harper
- Coronation Street character
- Portrayed by: John Hollingworth
- Appears in: Episode 11,770; 7 January 2026
- Introduced by: Kate Brooks
In-universe information
- Occupation: Surgeon

Doctor Vincent Harper, portrayed by John Hollingworth, is a surgeon who performs a caesarean section on Shona Platt (Julia Goulding), who was 28 weeks pregnant. He first appeared on 7 January 2026 after travelling to Weatherfield from Bristol to perform the surgery. During the surgery, Harper had to perform a tracheostomy so the baby could breathe after struggling to fit the original tube. Upon his arrival, he calls into Roy's Rolls where David Platt (Jack P. Shepherd) and Bernie Winter-Alahan (Jane Hazlegrove) are discussing Billy Mayhew's (Daniel Brocklebank) death. Harper then mentions Billy's sexuality after reading about his death in the paper, causing Bernie, who was Billy's mother-in-law, to give him the cold shoulder. Afterwards, before performing the surgery, he gets into an argument with David who later regrets it after realising he was the surgeon. After the successful surgery, David and Shona decide to name their daughter Harper after him. At the end of the episode, he calls into Roy's again for a pie and a tea and offers his condolences to Bernie, who lets him have his food for free. Rebecca Sayce from Digital Spy said: "Because of his prominence in the episode, and speaking about Billy, fans think that he is set to play a huge role in an ongoing storyline."

== Harper Platt ==
Harper Platt
- Coronation Street character
- Portrayed by: Bella & Betsy
- Duration: 2026–present
- First appearance: Episode 11,770; 7 January 2026
- Introduced by: Kate Brooks
In-universe information
- Father: David Platt
- Mother: Shona Platt
- Half-brothers: Clayton Hibbs; Max Turner (adoptive)
- Half-sisters: Lily Platt
- Grandfathers: Martin Platt; Doug Ramsey
- Grandmothers: Gail Platt
- Uncles: Nick Tilsley
- Aunts: Sarah Platt; Jodie Ramsey; Charlotte Platt
- First cousins: Bethany Platt; Billy Platt; Harry Platt; Sam Blakeman
- Other relatives: Audrey Roberts; Stephen Reid; George Shuttleworth

Harper Platt is the newborn daughter of David (Jack P. Shepherd) and Shona Platt (Julia Goulding). She was born on 7 January 2026 via caesarean section at 28 weeks. In September 2025, Shona reveals to her husband David that she is pregnant, after David finds a positive pregnancy test in the bin and assumes that it belongs to his teenage daughter Lily Platt (Grace Ashcroft-Gardner). During their first scan in November 2025, Shona and David are informed that there is a large mass on the baby's neck, which may be cancerous. A special episode which examines both David's and Shona's perspectives of the pregnancy was broadcast on 12 November 2025, where it is confirmed that their baby has a cervical teratoma, and Shona will need to undergo an EXIT procedure to ensure her and the baby's best chances of survival. David and Shona are also offered the option of a termination, which David encourages Shona to consider, leading to tensions within their marriage when Shona refuses.

In January 2026, David and Shona are involved in a multi-vehicle accident during the special hour-long Corriedale episode, where Coronation Street and fellow ITV1 soap Emmerdale crossover. Shortly after the crash, Shona goes into labour, and David suffers an epileptic seizure. After being transferred from Hotten to Weatherfield, Shona gives birth via caesarean section, and she and David name their baby Harper, after the surgeon who delivered her, Vincent Harper (John Hollingworth). Harper is placed in an incubator with a tracheostomy immediately after her birth due to the mass on her neck. Around the same time as Harper's birth, a mysterious newcomer named Jodie Ramsey (Olivia Frances-Brown), who was also involved in the Corriedale car accident, arrives in Weatherfield, sharing an identical tattoo to Shona, and begins secretly visiting Harper when David and Shona are absent. Jodie is later revealed to be Shona's half-sister.

== DI Thompson ==
DI Thompson
- Coronation Street character
- Portrayed by: Lindsay Bennett-Thompson
- Duration: 2026–present
- First appearance: Episode 11,773; 12 January 2026
- Introduced by: Kate Brooks
In-universe information
- Occupation: Detective Inspector

DI Thompson, portrayed by Lindsay Bennett-Thompson, is the new Detective Inspector of Weatherfield Police. She is the replacement for DI Costello (Daon Broni). She made her first appearance on 12 January 2026. On 4 May 2026, Brody Michaelis (Ryan Mulvey) is arrested for theft after selling Todd Grimshaw's (Gareth Pierce) missing phone to a pawn shop for easy cash, bringing him into the investigation of the murder of Theo Silverton (James Cartwright). DC Kit Green (Jacob Roberts), who is Brody's father, arrives back from his secondment and insists that Brody isn't dragged into the investigation. Vicky Myers, who plays DS Lisa Swain spoke about her new on-screen boss: "There's a new DI [Thompson] who wants to do everything by the book and is putting pressure on – not just on Lisa but also Kit and everyone who's in the station. It's also important to her, because this is on her watch. So no matter how long it takes, she will get there in the end."

== Lee ==
Lee, portrayed by Oscar Aldersley, made an appearance on 23 January 2026. He is a friend of Will Driscoll (Lucas Hodgson-Wale) and former student of Megan Walsh (Beth Nixon). His arrival was announced on 13 January 2026. When Lee arrives, it is revealed he was also groomed by Megan, who has been grooming Will. Aldersley's casting was announced to be a guest appearance as he posted that he had wrapped up filming on the same day his casting was announced. He posted on Instagram: "Wow what an experience! Thank you Coronation Street for this amazing opportunity. It's been a pleasure working with such an incredible team for the past couple of months! I'll hopefully see you all, back on the cobbles again soon!" Walsh, who plays Megan commented with praise: "Ahh had so much fun working with you! Can't wait to watch it on screen."

== Mal Roper ==
Mal Roper
- Coronation Street character
- Portrayed by: Tim Treloar
- First appearance: Episode 11,779; 28 January 2026
- Last appearance: Episode 11,834; 12 April 2026
- Introduced by: Kate Brooks
In-universe information
- Occupation: Electrician
- Wife: Alice Roper

Mal Roper, portrayed by Tim Treloar, is the husband of Alice, Roy Cropper's (David Neilson) pen-pal. Treloar's casting was announced on 21 January 2026 and he made his first appearance on 28 January 2026 when he arrives at Roy's Rolls. A Corrie Insider reported to Digital Spy: "Poor Roy is stunned when Mal arrives at the café. Mal wastes no time at all announcing that he's Alice's hubby. As you can imagine, Roy tries to explain himself, but it's yet to be seen whether Mal offers him forgiveness or not. Luckily, Nina is around, so hopefully she can help if it all goes pear-shaped!" After Roy reveals that he didn't know Alice was married, Mal reveals he and Alice have been married for 31 years and have three children together. The following day, Mal returns to the cafe to sort out the electrics. The insider continued: "How awful for Roy. Out of all of the electricians in Greater Manchester, it just has to be Mal, doesn't it? You couldn't make it up!" Mal later meets Bernie Winter-Alahan (Jane Hazlegrove) at the Chariot Square Hotel where they both drown their sorrows after he realises Alice hasn't been faithful and Bernie was grieving the loss of her son-in-law, Billy Mayhew (Daniel Brocklebank). Many fans recognised Treloar from other roles he has played previously.

On 11 February 2026, it was confirmed that Mal would be a new villain. Mal is due to show Brian Packham (Peter Gunn) a bag of crystals as he takes an interest to try and impress Bernie, who is interested in them and their properties, which annoys her. Bernie's son-in-law, Chesney Winter-Brown (Sam Aston) quizzes which crystal is his favourite, which he can't answer. A source reported: "Bernie just wants Mal to leave. Their wild night at the Chariot Square Hotel is one that she'd rather forget, but Mal is determined to stick around for as long as possible." The insider continued: "Although Mal claims that he's staying for work reasons – fixing the electrics at Roy's café – he seems to be worming his way into Bernie's life at every opportunity. Should she be worried?"

== Doug Ramsey ==
Doug Ramsey
- Coronation Street character
- Portrayed by: Steve Evets
- First appearance: Episode 11,790; 9 February 2026
- Introduced by: Kate Brooks
In-universe information
- Daughters: Shona Platt; Jodie Ramsey
- Grandsons: Clayton Hibbs
- Granddaughters: Harper Platt

Doug Ramsey, portrayed by Steve Evets, is the father of Shona Platt (Julia Goulding) and Jodie Ramsey (Olivia Frances-Brown). He appears on 9 February 2026, when Jodie visits him in hospital. Evets' casting was announced on 3 February 2026 with Maisie Spackman from Metro reporting: "Coronation Street fans are soon set to meet Shona Platt's dad, and he will be a familiar face to 90s soap fans." She continued: "Their father is set to be played by none other than Steve Evets, who hardcore soap fans will recognise as Emmerdale's Tom Shepherd." Lauren Morris from The Mirror confirmed Evets' role would be a guest, appearing in one episode. ITV teased: "Shona, convinced Jodie is hiding something, follows her to a psychiatric hospital where Jodie tearfully introduced their confused, estranged father. Jodie explains how she was left to care for him after their mother fled. Shona is touched and assures Jodie she's part of the family now."

On 24 July 2026, it was revealed by Goulding that Evets would be returning to Coronation Street as Doug. She described working with Evets to be "fantastic". She added: "Working with Steve Evets is a treat. It’s really interesting to explore the Ramsey family dynamic and piece together why Shona and Jodie are the way they are." She further teased: "He is coming back again soon and we will really find out a lot more about their history."

== Paula ==
Paula
- Coronation Street character
- Portrayed by: Kelli Hollis
- First appearance: Episode 11,796; 17 February 2026
- Introduced by: Kate Brooks

Paula, portrayed by Kelli Hollis, is a prison inmate of Debbie Webster (Sue Devaney) and Lou Michaelis (Farrel Hegarty). She has been described to be the "Queen Bee" inmate in the prison. Hollis' casting was announced on 3 February 2026 with Stefania Sarrubba from Digital Spy reporting: "Former Emmerdale star Kelli Hollis is returning to soapland in another series, 11 years after she left the Dales and the role of Ali Spencer behind. Now, the actor is crossing over to the cobbles as she joins Coronation Street for a new storyline." She continued: "As Debbie struggles to adjust to life in prison, where she reunites with none other than Corrie baddie Lou Michaelis, she's also meeting the other inmates – with Hollis's character being one of them."

Hollis posted a video expressing her excitement on TikTok with the caption: "MY 1ST DAY AT CORRIE. SO EXCITING." She also told her followers whilst seated in her dressing room: "Oh my god! What a morning! So I'm here at Corrie, I'm exhausted, and it's not from working. I've done two scenes already this morning, I've got two more now this afternoon." She continued: "But I'm exhausted from seeing everybody. The amount of crew that I've worked with before on other jobs that are here, phenomenal! And then let's talk about the cast. So our beautiful Jane [Hazlegrove], I worked with her on Clink, she heard I was here, and she came running up. And the most handsome man ever, apart from my Martin, the gorgeous Aaron McCusker. He come bounding in picked me up spun me around. I've been made to feel so welcome. What a brilliant day so far."

== Connie Waring ==
Connie Waring
- Coronation Street character
- Portrayed by: Aoife and Erin O'Neill
- First appearance: Episode 11,805; 2 March 2026
- Last appearance: Episode 11,839; 19 April 2026
- Introduced by: Kate Brooks
In-universe information
- Father: Rob Donovan
- Mother: Mandy Waring
- Half-brothers: Bobby Crawford
- Grandmothers: Sharon Donovan; Sheila Waring
- Aunts: Carla Connor

Connie Waring, portrayed by Aoife and Erin O'Neill, is the baby daughter of Rob Donovan (Marc Baylis) and Mandy Waring (Rebecca Atkinson), who is left on the doorstep of her aunt Carla Connor's (Alison King). She made her first appearance in March 2026 after a woman left her strapped in a car seat on the doorstep. Carla notices the lady running off and manages to catch up with her and ask her about Connie, which she reveals is her niece. Connie's arrival is due to cause chaos for Carla and her fiancée Lisa Swain (Vicky Myers). An insider told Digital Spy: "Carla's brother Rob had a fling with a prison guard called Mandy. Baby Connie is a result of that ill-fated fumble behind bars – which makes her Carla's niece. Little Connie's grandmother is heading into hospital for a while, so is sneakily trying to leave the tot with Carla to babysit and flee before she can refuse."

Initially, Carla doesn't want anything to do with her niece, but Lisa is due to have other ideas. The source continued: "As if Rob Donovan hadn't brought enough trouble into their lives, now he's disrupting things again. Although, as Lisa points out, this isn't Connie's fault. She can't help that her dad is a wrong'un who wants nothing to do with her. More to the point, if Carla won't take in Connie while the rest of her family aren't around, she'll end up going into care. Is that really what Carla wants for her own flesh and blood?" Despite Carla's resistance, Lisa manages to win her over. The source described how looking after Connie would affect Carla and Lisa: "It's barely been 24 hours and everyone's utterly exhausted. Carla took some persuading not to turn her back on Connie, as she thought she and Lisa would spend the next few weeks organising their upcoming wedding, not being knee-deep in nappies and sleepless nights."

Myers, who plays Lisa, spoke with TV Times: "Lisa is initially confused as to why Carla is refusing to engage. Carla talks about her past and the baby she lost, so that opens up avenues of discussion that I think a lot of viewers will relate to. As a police officer, Lisa sees families being split up and she'd rather have Connie be with them than go into the care system." King, who plays Carla, also told TV Times: "I think Carla's more fun around the baby. She's not sure what to do at first, but you'll see her come into her own and she starts to think: 'I'm fine. I'm doing well at this, actually'. She is away from the factory a bit and you'll see her juggling the baby and the job. There are some scenes where she has to take the baby into work, which were fun to film!"

== Melanie Driscoll ==
Melanie Driscoll
- Coronation Street character
- Portrayed by: Cindy Humphrey
- First appearance: Episode 11,841; 21 April 2026
- Last appearance: Episode 11,892; 3 July 2026
- Introduced by: Kate Brooks
In-universe information
- Husband: Ben Driscoll (backstory)
- Sons: Ollie Driscoll; Will Driscoll

Melanie Driscoll, portrayed by Cindy Humphrey, is the ex-wife of Ben Driscoll (Aaron McCusker) and the mother of Ollie (Raphael Akuwudike) and Will Driscoll (Lucas Hodgson-Wale). Humphrey's casting was announced on 14 April 2026 and her arrival would be part of Will's grooming storyline at the hands of athletics coach Megan Walsh (Beth Nixon). Melanie's arrival had previously been teased by Aaron McCusker, who plays her on-screen ex-husband Ben prior to his arrival in October 2025. He said: "Yes, an ex-wife, and we've talked about my brother as well. It'll be interesting, there's lots of different directions it could go, and I'm very excited to see where it does go."

As the story unfolds, the Crown Prosecution Service haven't got enough evidence to prosecute Megan, who is set to face no charges. Whilst Ollie, Ben and Melanie's older son points the finger at Ben, Melanie blames Ben's mother Maggie Driscoll (Pauline McLynn) for not protecting Will. A source told Digital Spy: "Will's grandmother Maggie is shocked when she finds Melanie in the Bistro – although it was probably only a matter of time before she made an appearance. Melanie doesn't hold back, accusing Maggie of failing to protect Will when he needed her. Although Maggie doesn't know what else she could have done, it's tough to talk round Melanie, who claims that she's allowed him to become a victim of child grooming." Ollie later reveals that he is responsible for getting in contact with Melanie. The source continued: "The timing of Melanie's visit is certainly interesting. Maggie has always been the family member who's most willing to cross the line when it comes to bringing down Megan."

== Damo ==
Damo, portrayed by Jake Parry, appeared on 26 May 2026. Parry's casting was announced on 21 May 2026 and details revealed that his appearance will see him tumble out of a car as part of Leanne Battersby (Jane Danson) and Idris Nazir's (Junade Khan) storyline. Parry previously played Simon Barlow in 2003, alongside his twin brother, Oscar before Alex Bain took over the role when the character returned in 2008. Parry posted a preview of his appearance on TikTok with the caption: "It’s a pleasure and an honor to be back on this great show, DAMO is coming next week." He further clarified: "For anyone wondering I played Simon Barlow with my brother when I was a baby, I have now [come] back as a different character DAMO which is out next week."

== Idris Nazir ==
Idris Nazir
- Coronation Street character
- Portrayed by: Junade Khan
- First appearance: Episode 11,865; 26 May 2026
- Introduced by: Kate Brooks
In-universe information
- Father: Sharif Nazir
- Half-brothers: Kal Nazir
- Nephews: Zeedan Nazir
- Nieces: Alya Nazir

Idris Nazir, portrayed by Junade Khan, is the half-brother of Alya Nazir's (Sair Khan) deceased father, Kal Nazir (Jimi Mistry). His casting was announced on 3 May 2026 and made his first appearance on 26 May 2026. He will be introduced as a new love interest for Leanne Battersby (Jane Danson), whose actress previously called for her to have a second chance of love. Executive producer Kate Brooks spoke about Idris' character: "Idris is very charming – the charm oozes out of every pore of this guy! He's a savvy businessman and he's got a bit of a ruthless streak. He's not ready to get his hands even slightly dirty! But he can charm the birds from the trees."

Daniel Kilkelly from Digital Spy suggested that Idris' arrival would be a "new chapter" for Leanne after her ex-partner Nick Tilsley's (Ben Price) affair with her stepsister Toyah Habeeb (Georgia Taylor). Brooks continued: "Idris is a new love interest for Leanne. The attraction is instantaneous. It gives Leanne a new lease of life. She's been harbouring a deep-rooted resentment towards Toyah and Nick, because that's the life she had. But then this guy comes along – he's got it all and he makes her laugh. He's funny, he's a handsome chap and he ruffles a lot of feathers, but he's not without an edge. He's not soft and he's certainly no pushover. He butts heads with some of our more alpha characters quite early on. We're really excited about Idris – he's brilliant." Kilkelly described Idris' arrival to "provide a welcome distraction". Jane Danson, who plays Leanne, previously suggested a bad boy as a new love interest for her character. She spoke about it at the Inside Soap Awards in December 2024: "Do you know what, there aren't a huge amount of possibilities! We're a bit short on the men front. I think long-term she needs a Cain Dingle (played by Jeff Hordley) - I think he should hotfoot it over from Emmerdale, have a pint in the Rovers and have a thing with Leanne!"

== Janine Walsh ==
Janine Walsh
- Coronation Street character
- Portrayed by: Melissa Jacques
- First appearance: Episode 11,888; 30 June 2026
- Last appearance: Episode 11,892; 3 July 2026
- Introduced by: Kate Brooks
In-universe information
- Daughters: Megan Walsh

Janine Walsh, portrayed by musical theatre star Melissa Jacques, is the mother of Megan Walsh (Beth Nixon). She is due to arrive in Weatherfield before Megan stands trial for grooming and sexually abusing Will Driscoll (Luca Hodgson-Wale). Jacques' casting was announced on 13 June 2026 and Joe Anderton from Digital Spy described her arrival to "set to light a few fireworks as soon as she arrives." Anderton also revealed that Janine would clash with Will's family more or less as soon as she arrives on the street. Catherine Tyldesley, who plays Eva Price, the partner of Will's father Ben Driscoll (Aaron McCusker) revealed that Janine would apologise for Megan's behaviour.

Speaking to TV Times magazine, Tyldesley said: "Janine tries to apologise on behalf of Megan; she is bewildered as to why this happened. But, sometimes, people grow up in normal, loving families and things go extremely wrong. That's what Eva sees. She's like, 'It's not Janine's fault.' Then you've got Maggie, who's like, 'Well, Megan has learnt this behaviour from someone!'"

== Ross Wilkes ==
Ross Wilkes
- Coronation Street character
- Portrayed by: Ian Burfield
- First appearance: Episode 11,895; 8 July 2026
- Introduced by: Kate Brooks
In-universe information
- Sons: Tyrone Dobbs
- Grandsons: Dorin Pop
- Granddaughters: Ruby Dobbs; Hope Dobbs (adoptive)

Ross Wilkes, portrayed by Ian Burfield, is the estranged father of Tyrone Dobbs (Alan Halsall). His casting was announced on 4 May 2026 and he would debut in the following weeks. Ross is due to arrive as Tyrone's mother, Cassie Plummer (Claire Sweeney) would be leaving the soap. Executive producer Kate Brooks suggested that Ross would be involved in "explosive" scenes. Rebecca Sayce from Digital Spy suggested that Ross' arrival would be part of a "mammoth exit storyline". Sayce also described Burfield's casting to "add another soap to his belt" after appearing as three different police officers in EastEnders, his most prolific being DCI Peter Arthurs between 2018 and 2024, as well as The Bill.

Brooks spoke about Ross' arrival: "Tyrone's dad makes an appearance in the show. Needless to say, he comes with quite a bit of drama. It's going to cause quite a lot of friction within that family, obviously with Cassie's history." She continued: "As you know, Cassie's leaving us, and so it will contribute to her exit, which is going to be massive and quite explosive. It'll be full of all the twists and turns that you can come to expect from an exit story." Brooks also spoke about how Ross will try to build a relationship with Tyrone: "He comes into the world of Fiz and Tyrone. Tyrone's in the mindset of: 'I'm in my 40's, I've survived this long without a dad!' But the dad is very keen to connect with Tyrone." Brooks also teased a possible relationship for Ross: "It's not long before he makes eyes at one of the residents - maybe a relationship starts there. It really shines a spotlight on Fiz and Tyrone as a couple and that family dynamic. Cassie is, needless to say, not happy that this guy has turned back up!"

== Lenny Boyd ==
Lenny Boyd, portrayed by Joe Osborne, is the estranged husband of Christina Boyd (Amy Robbins) who appeared on 10 July 2026. His casting was announced on 2 July 2026 and he appeared after Christina meets him behind her current partner, George Shuttleworth's (Tony Maudsley) back. Osborne has had two previous role on Coronation Street as Rod Kempson and Jason Waterford in 2017 and 2023 respectively. Stefania Sarrubba from Digital Spy revealed: "Osborne is reportedly set to play a brand new character as the soap unearths the secrets that Christina is keeping from her partner George." An insider told Digital Spy: "There's a lot of love for Christina these days, and those close to her hope that she's being genuine with George. But her shifty actions have caused suspicion, and when Glenda goes through her handbag, she gets a clue that changes everything!"

== Sadie Milburn ==
Sadie Milburn
- Coronation Street character
- Portrayed by: Elizabeth Rider
- Appears in: Episode 11,914; 3 August 2026
- Introduced by: Kate Brooks
In-universe information
- Sons: Tristan Milburn
- Daughters: Sienna Milburn

Sadie Milburn, portrayed by Elizabeth Rider, is the mother of Sienna Milburn (Charlotte Tyree) who set to appear over the summer of 2026. Rider's casting was announced on 21 July 2026 with Harriet Mitchell from Digital Spy describing her to be "a recognisable face in British TV, Rider has appeared in all four British soaps with roles in Emmerdale, EastEnders and Hollyoaks." Further details about her character were revealed on 28 July 2026 when Digital Spy revealed that she was the mother of Sienna, who has dementia. Rider also appeared in now defunct BBC One daytime soap opera Doctors as recurring character DCI Lynette Driver between 2009 and 2017. This would be Rider's third role on Coronation Street after playing Ashley Peacock's (Steven Arnold) estranged biological mother, Kathleen Gutteridge between August and October 1999, and then a social worker helping Les Battersby-Brown (Bruce Jones) adopt his stepson Chesney Brown (Sam Aston) in 2006. Mitchell also commented: "It's unsurprising that Rider would be playing a new character, as her on-screen son Ashley, played by Steven Arnold, died on the soap."

On 28 July 2026, it was revealed that Coronation Street would explore the "reality of late-stage dementia next week, when Debbie Webster (Sue Devaney) chances upon another woman who's living with the condition." After Debbie meets Sadie, it's clear that she has worse symptoms of dementia. However, Sadie's reaction to Debbie's intervention when she appears lost and confused gives her a glimpse of what her life could be like when her illness worsens. A source told Digital Spy: "This is a heartbreaking moment for Debbie as it's one thing to know what's coming, but another thing to experience it in such a visceral way. In that moment, Debbie sees how much Sadie is suffering but also what it'll be like for her family when they are trying to care for her. The whole experience shakes Debbie to the core." Sienna sees her mum and rushes to help, but Sadie doesn't recognise her. Sienna later confides in her partner Asha Alahan (Tanisha Gorey) about future care options, which Debbie's husband Ronnie Bailey (Vinta Morgan) overhears. The insider explained Ronnie's feelings: "Sienna's pain and anguish over her mum going into a care home is a bleak reminder that Ronnie will one day face a similar decision." They continued: "He knows Debbie's condition is progressing and explains to James that their holiday came with a lot of challenges he didn't expect. Now Ronnie knows he has to face the future and begin making plans for Debbie's health and safety. That's really tough when he's slowly losing the woman he loves, and she knows she's losing herself too."

== Richie Parkinson ==
Richie Parkinson
- Coronation Street character
- Portrayed by: Nathan Sussex
- Duration: 2026–present
- First appearance: Episode 11,917; 6 August 2026
- Introduced by: Kate Brooks
In-universe information
- Wife: Rachel Parkinson
- Daughters: Lucy Parkinson
- First cousins: Tim Metcalfe

Richie Parkinson, portrayed by Nathan Sussex, is the cousin of Tim Metcalfe (Joe Duttine), who is set to cause trouble for him and his wife Sally (Sally Dynevor) as a couple. His casting was announced on 21 July 2026 and his character is due to test the couple's relationship. Sussex is known for his previous soap role as sex offender Buster Smith in Channel 4's Hollyoaks between 2018 and 2021. His character was the father of Damon Kinsella, who was portrayed by Jacob Roberts, who now plays DC Kit Green. On 4 August 2026, it was revealed that Richie would be charged with the murder of his wife Rachel. An insider told Digital Spy: "Tim thought he and Richie would be catching up over a pint, not a table in a prison visiting room." They continued: "Richie answers the door covered in blood with a dazed expression on his face. Bemused Tim takes a look inside and can't believe what he sees – then he dials 999…"

His arrival was previously teased by executive producer Kate Brooks who suggested the new subplot would focus on Sally and Tim being the foster parents of Brody (Ryan Mulvey), Joanie (Savanna Pennington) and Shanice Michaelis (Molly Kilduff). She explained in May 2026: "There's a massive story for Sally and Tim that comes to the fore. It's a story that tests them as people, tests them as a couple, but tests them as foster parents as well." She continued: "It's a bit of a curveball and it comes from slightly left field, but absolutely upends their lives. It's how they navigate that situation going forward. Sally and Tim are so beloved and I just adore them. It's seeing them in a slightly different position than what we've seen them in before." It was later revealed that Sally and Tim would step up to foster Richie's daughter Lucy Parkinson (Anya Dewin) after he is charged with murder.

== Kacey Wadlow ==
Kacey Wadlow, portrayed by Emma Matthews, is a prison inmate who befriends Sarah Platt (Tina O'Brien) whilst she is remanded in custody awaiting trial for the murder of Theo Silverton (James Cartwright). She first appeared on 9 August 2026. Matthews' casting was announced on 3 August 2026 and Kacey would be her third role on Coronation Street after playing a nurse at Weatherfield General between 2012 and 2015, and playing social worker Fiona Crowley, who was responsible for taking Abi Webster's (Sally Carman) twins Charlie and Lexi Franklin (Jacob and Jasmine Fish) in October 2017. An insider told Digital Spy: "Sarah is a desperate woman and she's in grave danger. Kacey is her only hope right now and Sarah's so grateful for her, especially when Kacey offers to look out for her." They continued: "But it's rare for people to do these sorts of favours in prison without an ulterior motive, so Sarah may find that Kacey is too good to be true."

== Gavin Fairholme ==
Gavin Fairholme, portrayed by Andrew Lewis, appeared on 11 August 2026. His casting was announced on 5 August 2026 with Stefania Sarrubba from Digital Spy reporting: "A Holby City star has been cast on Coronation Street for a guest role in a storyline revealing a worrying side to newcomer Idris Nazir (Junade Khan)." Gavin is due to arrive with the interest of buying half of Speed Daal from Alya Nazir (Sair Khan) after Idris' partner Leanne Battersby (Jane Danson) sells her half, but Idris has other ideas. Lewis is known for playing anaesthetist Paul Rose in the BBC medical drama for ten years between 2000 and 2010. Lewis only appeared in two scenes of one episode.

== Lucy Parkinson ==
Lucy Parkinson
- Coronation Street character
- Portrayed by: Anya Dewin
- Duration: 2026–present
- First appearance: Episode 11,921; 13 August 2026
- Introduced by: Kate Brooks
In-universe information
- Father: Richie Parkinson
- Mother: Rachel Parkinson
- Grandmothers: Christina Boyd
- Aunts: Daisy Midgeley
- Other relatives: Tim Metcalfe

Lucy Parkinson, portrayed by Anya Dewin, is the daughter of Richie Parkinson (Nathan Sussex). She made her debut on 13 August 2026 after her father is charged with the murder of her mother Rachel. Her casting was announced on 3 August 2026. It was revealed that Lucy would end up staying with Richie's cousin Tim Metcalfe (Joe Duttine) and his wife Sally (Sally Dynevor) whilst Richie goes through the justice system. An insider told Digital Spy: "When Richie is accused of killing his wife, his young daughter Lucy has to stay with the Metcalfes. Tim's blast from the past is about to cause big problems for his future." Jonathon Hughes from Digital Spy revealed that "Sally and Tim's parenting skills are really put to the test as they look after Lucy" despite their success in fostering Brody (Ryan Mulvey), Joanie (Savanna Pennington) and Shanice Michaelis (Molly Kilduff). When Lucy is placed in Sally and Tim's care, she ends up doing a runner. The social worker explains that they have to be very sensitive with Lucy as she is suffering from grief and trauma after her mother's death. The insider explained: "Lucy has done a runner. Stressed Sal dashes out with Tim to track her down, and thankfully they find her at the bus stop. They convince her to come back, but it's clear Lucy is feeling unsettled."

Dewin took to social media to announce her casting. She posted a photo of herself outside the Rovers Return Inn with the caption: "I still can't quite believe I get to say this, but I'm so grateful to be joining the cast of Coronation Street! This has been such a blessing, working alongside the most beautiful people, and getting to live out a dream I've had for so long. Some dreams really come true don’t they?" She went on to thank her management for the opportunity, before saying: "There’s a new girl on the Cobbles…." Sydney Martin, who plays Betsy Swain, shared her support by commenting: "can't wait to watch you shine sweet girl." Cait Fitton, who plays Lauren Bolton, posted: "I am so excited for this!!" George Shuttleworth star Tony Maudsley added: "And you are a DREAM casting!! What a wonderful job you're doing, Anya!! Welcome aboard!! Roll on Thursday!! HERE COMES LUCY!!!" Joe-Warren Plant, who plays Jacob Sugden in fellow ITV1 soap opera Emmerdale, shared his support by saying: "Congratulations!!!"

In September 2026, after a physical incident with Sally and trying to cry to help to Tim, she has a secret late night call with Richie. It is revealed that she was terrified what she did to Sally, seeming genuinely upset and remorseful. And that she feels like there is something bad inside of her, and that's she terrified what she did to her mum Rachel could happen again to Sally or anyone else in The Metcalfe household. Richie reassured her that Rachel caused it and he would continue to protect her. This revealed that Lucy caused the death of her mother, Rachel either on purpose, in a mental illness crisis or from possibly abuse. The full reason of the attack is currently unknown. Lucy is also confirmed to be the granddaughter of established character, Christina Boyd (Amy Robbins), who is revealed to have been Rachel's biological mother.

== Celeste Butterfield ==
Celeste Butterfield
- Coronation Street character
- Portrayed by: Frances Barber
- First appearance: Episode 11,925; 19 August 2026
- Last appearance: Episode 11,932; 30 August 2026
- Introduced by: Kate Brooks
In-universe information
- Nieces: Bernie Winter
- Other relatives: Gemma Winter; Kit Green; Brody Michaelis; Aled Winter-Brown; Bryn Winter-Brown; Carys Winter-Brown; Llio Winter-Brown

Celeste Butterfield, portrayed by Frances Barber, is the estranged aunt of Bernie Winter-Alahan (Jane Hazlegrove). Barber's casting was announced on 30 June 2026 and her character would be a guest role. She is due to arrive when she visits Shuttleworth's to organise and Dolly Parton themed funeral for herself. She tells Todd Grimshaw (Gareth Pierce) that she has cancer and only six months to live. However Bernie, whose mother is Celeste's twin isn't pleased to see her after her and Bernie's mother had a falling out and she's not ready to forgive. Speaking of her character, Barber said: "She reminds me completely of the women that I adored and grew up with, such as Elsie Tanner (Pat Phoenix). She's straightforward, witty and clever and says it as it is." She continued: "She's a Dolly Parton fan, so she's dressed head to foot in cow print and cowboy outfits. She even sings a bit of Dolly Parton at one point. She's wonderful. It was the gift of a part for any actress my age and I relished it."

Barber also spoke about her experiences and how they relate to her upcoming role: "The truth is that I've wanted to walk the cobbles for 40 years. It was on my bucket list. I'm a complete and utter fanatic. I grew up on it. I'm from a council estate in Wolverhampton, one of six kids. I know Wolverhampton isn't Weatherfield, but it's not that dissimilar." She continued: "I used to be a Saturday girl in Marks & Spencer and the shoppers were like all the women on Corrie – strong, blunt, down-to-earth and very funny. I've loved them and respected them all my life, so it was always a dream. I thought 'one day I will walk the cobbles.' And I did, so I'm over the moon about it. It's absolutely one of my career highlights."

== Fraser ==
Fraser
- Coronation Street character
- Portrayed by: Chris Grahamson
- First appearance: Episode 11,926; 20 August 2026
- Last appearance: Episode 11,927; 21 August 2026
- Introduced by: Kate Brooks
In-universe information
- Occupation: Driver

Fraser, portrayed by Chris Grahamson, is the driver for Celeste (Frances Barber). His casting was announced on 11 August 2026 and would arrive when he drives Celeste to Shuttleworth's undertakers where she is going to organise her own funeral. He is also going to be introduced as a new love interest for Todd Grimshaw (Gareth Pierce). This is Grahamson's second role in Coronation Street after portraying the pastor of the church which Sophie Webster (Brooke Vincent) and Sian Powers (Sacha Parkinson) attended, who led the church choir and was an integral part of Sophie's coming out storyline. Initially, Glenda Shuttleworth (Jodie Prenger) takes a liking to Fraser, however he later reveals that he is gay.

An insider told Digital Spy: "They head to the Rovers to discuss her Dolly Parton-themed funeral plans over drinks. Flirty Glenda takes a real shine to Celeste's driver, Fraser, and she's thrilled when she gets his number and they arrange a date!" Rebecca Sayce from Digital Spy revealed: "Fraser wastes no time making friends, hitting it off with barmaid Glenda and capturing the attention of Todd." This scenario, alongside Todd's drinking and spiralling, will cause friction between him and Glenda.

== Luke Cookson ==
Luke Cookson, portrayed by Isaac James, is an assault victim who was interviewed by Kit Green (Jacob Roberts) whilst in hospital. He made a guest appearance on 7 September 2026 when Kit asks him questions regarding his attack. Despite his mother's hesitation, he agreed to talk to him. He later died as a result of a slow bleed on the brain caused by his injuries. James posted about his guest stint on Instagram with behind the scene photos and the caption: "Said four words and then died in tonight's Coronation Street… iconic if you ask me." Maisie Spackman from the Metro described James to have "actually sold himself short, with Luke having said five words, addressing both his mum and Kit."

== Marco Rhodes ==
Marco Rhodes
- Coronation Street character
- Portrayed by: William Teasdale
- Duration: 2026–present
- First appearance: Episode 11,942; 14 September 2026
- Introduced by: Kate Brooks
In-universe information
- Occupation: Tattoo Artist

Marco Rhodes, portrayed by William Teasdale, is a new love interest for Summer Spellman (Harriet Bibby) who first appeared on 14 September 2026. His casting was announced on Instagram on 9 September 2026. Jessica Sansome from Manchester Evening News reported that spoilers revealed that he would meet Summer in the cafe where he compliments her drawing. After confiding in her friends Asha Alahan (Tanisha Gorey) and Amy Barlow (Elle Mulvaney), she agrees to go on a date with him despite her reservations. Teasdale posted on his Instagram: "Still feels a bit mad saying this but…I will be joining the insanely talented cast of @coronationstreet!!! Absolutely buzzing and still pinching myself to be honest! I am so grateful and thankful to have been offered this role, and to be a part of this incredible team! I just want to say a massive even bigger thank you to @alexpriestleytalent @camillejackson_agent @lauraswingler.agent and the legends that you all are!" He continued: "I know how special this is and I owe so much to so so many incredible people. Much love as always and see you on’t cobbles, Marco Rhodes."

His announcement was welcomed by fellow co-stars Sydney Martin, who plays Betsy Swain and Mulvaney, who commented "Welcome to the club!!" and "Wooooo welcome welcome welcome" respectively. Isabelle Smith, who formerly played Sonya and now plays Frankie Osborne in Channel 4 soap opera Hollyoaks and close friend of Martin's, commented with: "Yeyyy congratulations!!!"

== Jonesy ==
Jonesy, portrayed by Carl Rice, is a prison inmate of Gary Windass (Mikey North) who is serving an eight month prison sentence. He first appeared on 23 October 2026. When he and Gary begin sharing a cell, Gary discovers that Jonesy is supplying drugs to other inmates and worries that stashing them in their cell will jeopardise his potential early release. North spoke about Rice's character: "It's prison, so it's never going to be an easy ride! Jonesy is a great character, and Carl Rice plays him brilliantly. There's going to be lots coming up with Gary having to protect himself inside, so there's so much going on there. Jonesy is definitely another little Corrie villain who's popped up."

== Other characters ==
Character	Portrayer(s)	Episode date(s)	Details	Ref
Annie King	Marie Critchley	12 February-3 April	A woman who accuses George Shuttleworth (Tony Maudsley) of manipulating her mother after she leaves him £10,000 in her will.	
Colin	Karl Cam	13 February	A homeless man who was framed for attacking Daniel Osbourne (Rob Mallard) on Christmas Day by Maggie Driscoll (Pauline McLynn), when it was actually her grandson, Will (Lucas Hodgson-Wale) who was responsible.	
Olivia	Lucy Dulson	24 February	A teen girl who comes looking for Jodie Ramsey. She is one of the children Jodie apparently nannied for before she disappeared.	
Joan Ripley	Eileen O'Brien	25–26 February	A client of George Shuttleworth's (Tony Maudsley) who asks him to do her sister's funeral. Christina Boyd (Amy Robbins) then makes a joke about George trying to cosy up to her to get into her will, which she takes badly. She later returns the next day for George to reassure her that he wasn't, however she dies on the couch.	
Damien Ripley	Matthew Flynn	27 February-3 April	The son of Joan (Eileen O'Brien) who arrives at Shuttleworth's who he's happy to do his mother's funeral until Annie King (Marie Critchley) suggests George (Tony Maudsley) is scamming his clients.	
Declan	Sean Kearns	12 March	An old army colleague of Jim McDonald (Charles Lawson) who attends his funeral. He later confronts Maggie Driscoll (Pauline McLynn) about her past affair with Jim.	
Davey	Stephen Don	12 March	An old army colleague of Jim McDonald (Charles Lawson) who attends his funeral.	
Lottie	Emma-Grace Arends	20 August-	A woman whose son is starting at Bessie Street school with Harry Platt (Joshua Leavy)	
Beatrice	Lucinda Sinclair	26 August	The counselor of Lucy Parkinson (Anya Dewin).	
