= Corriedale (crossover episode) =

Crossover of ITV soap operas Coronation Street and Emmerdale

- Coronation Street and Emmerdale crossover event
- Directed by: Duncan Foster
- Written by: Owen Lloyd Fox
- Original air date: 5 January 2026

"Corriedale" is a one-off 60 minute (43 excluding the adverts) crossover episode between ITV's two long-running soap operas, Coronation Street and Emmerdale. The crossover was announced on 14 May 2025 as a part of ITV's scheduling changes and cutbacks for 2026.

Corriedale was broadcast on ITV1 on 5 January 2026.

== Background ==
Crossover references and episodes involving soaps have previously been featured on British television, with the BBC One soap EastEnders mentioning Coronation Street on at least two occasions. The first mention of the soap was in Episode 219, which was originally transmitted on 19 March 1987. In a scene set in The Queen Victoria public house, Nick Cotton (John Altman) is attempting to sell counterfeit CDs to Chris Smith (Allan O'Keefe). When Nick asks Chris where he is from, Chris replies "Cheshire", to which Nick replies "Seen them before? I don't suppose they'll reach Coronation Street Land yet."

The second mention on EastEnders was in Episode 451, which was originally transmitted on 1 June 1989. This episode featured Arthur Fowler (Bill Treacher) appearing on the fictional television game show Cat and Mouse. Where he was asked the question "Who played Ena Sharples in Coronation Street?", Arthur gave the correct answer: Violet Carson.

Channel 4 soap operas Brookside and Hollyoaks have frequently referenced each other, with a crossover episode broadcast in October 2025 to mark Hollyoaks' 30th anniversary, The Emmerdale Plane crash of 1993 storyline, created by programme consultant Phil Redmond (creator of both Brookside and Hollyoaks) was referenced in the Brookside Episode 1351, originally transmitted on 5 January 1994. in a scene with character Mick Johnson (Louis Emerick) who was seen reading a newspaper with the front page headline "Air Crash Latest - Village Mourns As Many Die". but both Coronation Street and Emmerdale have also been involved in crossover projects.

In November 2010, a charity crossover episode featuring characters from both Coronation Street and EastEnders titled East Street was aired as part of that year's Children in Need telethon. Also on 9 December 2010, to celebrate the 50th anniversary of Coronation Street, EastEnders character Dot Branning (played by June Brown, who appeared in Coronation Street as Mrs Parsons from 1970 to 1971) explains in a scene in the laundrette, involving Stacey Branning (Lacey Turner) and Kat Moon (played by Jessie Wallace, who appeared in The Road to Coronation Street as Pat Phoenix) that she would not be attending the choir rehearsals later that evening for a very good reason: "Tonight, I'm going to open a bag of marshmallows, share them with Jim and watch Corrie! With Kat replying "Yeah!, I think I'd rather watch my dirty washing spinning round" Dot replies, "Oh Kat, I love it; it's my favourite. Never miss it."

In November 2021, characters in Casualty, Coronation Street, Doctors, EastEnders, Emmerdale, Holby City and Hollyoaks made references to one another during a special week of episodes, highlighting issues around climate change and the environmental crisis. The episodes were broadcast the same week as the 2021 United Nations Climate Change Conference. On 19 November 2021, three characters, Steve McDonald (Simon Gregson) from Coronation Street, Janine Butcher (Charlie Brooks) from EastEnders, and Eric Pollard (Chris Chittell) from Emmerdale, all appeared in a First Dates special for Children in Need.

== Development ==
Iain MacLeod, who has been the executive producer for both Coronation Street and Emmerdale since 2024, began devising a crossover storyline shortly after taking up his role. After initially considering scenarios in which characters from one series would appear in the other, McLeod decided to "go huge". He has said his commute across the Pennines between Greater Manchester and West Yorkshire gave him the idea for Corriedale's setting. Plans for a one-hour crossover episode involving Coronation Street and Emmerdale were first announced by ITV in May 2025 to coincide with a new scheduling pattern for both series. In October, ITV announced that production on the one-off episode had begun in September, and confirmed Corriedale as the episode's title. Both soaps also began to include references to each other's storylines in episodes, an example being a wanted poster giving details of the Emmerdale character John Sugden (played by Oliver Farnworth, who appeared in Coronation Street as Andy Carver from 2014 to 2017) appearing in a scene set at a police station in an episode of Coronation Street that aired in September. Another example is Belle Dingle (Eden Taylor-Draper) from Emmerdale helping plan the wedding for Coronation Street characters Debbie Webster (Sue Devaney) and Ronnie Bailey's (Vinta Morgan) wedding. A trailer was released in early December showing a multiple-vehicle collision, with a second trailer released two weeks later. At the same time, ITV confirmed that, unlike regular episodes of both series, Corriedale would not be made available on ITVX prior to its transmission. On 16 December, it was announced that an audience of cast members from both soaps had attended an advance showing of the episode at the National Science and Media Museum in Bradford, West Yorkshire.

On 11 December, ITV published its television listings for the first week of January 2026, and confirmed the episode, co-produced by Kate Brooks (who has produced Emmerdale from 2017 until 2023, and Coronation Street since 2024), and Laura Shaw producer of Emmerdale since 2017. Corriedale is written by Owen Lloyd Fox and is directed by veteran director of soaps Duncan Foster (who has long-served as director of Coronation Street since 2002 and Emmerdale since 2001 respectively), would air on ITV1 at 8pm on 5 January. It was preceded by individual episodes of each soap, both of which were available prior to their transmission through ITVX as usual. The launch coincided with ITV's new soap "power hour", which sees both series air for 30 minutes each between 8pm and 9pm on weekdays.

On 29 December 2025, it was announced that Corriedale would also air on Ireland's Virgin Media One in the same timeslot, and that Virgin Media One would also air the two soaps as part of a "soap power hour".

== Plot ==
The episode begins following individual Emmerdale and Coronation Street episodes aired earlier in the evening. As seen in these episodes, a car is being erratically driven by Yorkshire murderer John Sugden (Oliver Farnworth), with his estranged husband Aaron Dingle (Danny Miller) as a passenger. John lets go of the steering wheel, screaming that he loves Aaron. Aaron wrestles for control of the wheel whilst John tries to take the shotgun that Aaron is pointing at him. Meanwhile, in another vehicle, driven by corrupt police officer Becky Swain (Amy Cudden), Becky's estranged wife Lisa (Vicky Myers) demands that Becky stop the car, which also contains their daughter Betsy (Sydney Martin). John and Becky's cars collide, resulting in the vehicle carrying Aaron and John being flipped upside down, and the Swains' car crashing off the road. All are knocked unconscious; John awakens, leaves Aaron behind and disappears.

Meanwhile, Lisa's estranged fiancée Carla Connor (Alison King) has been rescued from captivity by DC Kit Green (Jacob Roberts), who tracked Becky's latest moves to discover where she was holding Carla hostage. They arrive at the scene of the crash and Carla runs to the Swains' car, then tries to flag down an approaching minibus, which is carrying guests from Ronnie Bailey's (Vinta Morgan) wedding to Debbie Webster (Sue Devaney). The minibus driver, local vicar Billy Mayhew (Daniel Brocklebank), swerves to avoid Carla and tips the minibus, which crashes on its side, leaking petrol. Its passengers are Billy's ex-partner Todd Grimshaw (Gareth Pierce) and his abusive boyfriend Theo Silverton (James Cartwright); Tracy McDonald (Kate Ford), her estranged husband Steve (Simon Gregson), and his partner Cassie Plummer (Claire Sweeney); young paramedic Asha Alahan (Tanisha Gorey), who is recovering from a recent mental breakdown, and former footballer James Bailey (Jason Callender); and married couple David (Jack P. Shepherd) and Shona Platt (Julia Goulding), who are expecting a child. David and Todd are knocked unconscious.

In another vehicle, Debbie is pleading with her younger brother (Note: Later revealed in 2026 to be her son.) Carl (Jonathan Howard) to stop the car because he has been drinking. Their car smashes into the Swains' car, pushing it further down the road. Betsy and Becky awaken but Lisa remains unconscious. Carl is initially knocked out but awakens to find Debbie still unconscious. Terrified of being caught drink driving, he moves his sister into the driver's seat, before collapsing on the grass some feet beyond the vehicle.

In another vehicle are Cain Dingle (Jeff Hordley) and his wife Moira (Natalie J. Robb), travelling with Cain's granddaughter Sarah Sugden (Katie Hill) and her new husband Jacob Gallagher (Joe-Warren Plant). Unknown to them, they are being tailed by Mackenzie Boyd (Lawrence Robb), Moira's younger brother, who is married to Sarah's grandmother Charity (Emma Atkins). Charity claims to be a surrogate for Sarah and Jacob, but is actually carrying a child from a one-night stand. Mackenzie, believing the baby to be his and Charity's, does not notice that Cain has braked because of the accident, swerves and hits a tree.

Jacob and Asha, as trainee doctor and paramedic, rush to the casualties. Everyone except Billy gradually escapes from the minibus; Todd is lying unconscious in the road and Theo calls for help. Shona panics when she cannot feel her baby moving, but Jacob reassures her; they feel the baby kick. Shona is having contractions and realises she may be about to go into labour. Meanwhile, Debbie awakens and begins to wander around; her other brother Kevin (Michael Le Vell) and his estranged wife Abi (Sally Carman-Duttine), who has been having an affair with Carl, arrive to search for her. Carla continues trying to free Lisa, and is helped by James to pull Betsy out of the car. Carl remains unconscious at the roadside until Asha finds him and begins to perform CPR, saving his life.

Charity awakens to find Mack impaled in the arm. Jacob helps to stabilise him with a makeshift tourniquet made from Kevin's tie. Mack tries to tell Sarah the truth, but is persuaded from a single word by Charity to refrain from doing so. A fire has begun on-board the minibus and Billy manages to undo his belt. To his surprise, Theo appears to help him escape. Billy, who has recently discovered that Theo has been abusing Todd, says, "There's still some good in you, Theo." Theo then pushes Billy down, clips his belt back on and abandons him. Billy prays tearfully before the minibus explodes. Theo escapes unscathed, much to Todd's distress as he realises Billy is dead.

Amongst the chaos, other vehicles have arrived. Robert Sugden (Ryan Hawley), John's half-brother, who is in a relationship with Aaron, and once-sworn enemy Joe Tate (Ned Porteous) have come to look for Aaron; when Robert finds Aaron and accepts his roadside proposal, Joe is knocked aside by the minibus explosion. Kit finds Joe some help and vows to go after John, whose attempt to shoot Robert is thwarted. As he flees and Kit heads out to find him, Robert and Cain agree to make a separate attempt to find John. All three head into the woods while Aaron, Shona and Mack are loaded into ambulances. Tracy notices that the fire from the minibus wreckage is spreading towards the Swains' car, where Lisa is on oxygen in the passenger seat. The various characters team up to move the wrecked car, bringing Lisa to safety. She is freed and loaded into an ambulance. Becky tries to escape, but Lisa handcuffs herself to Becky and arrests her. Charity later says she saw Becky taken away in a police car.

Also stuck in the traffic are Chas Dingle (Lucy Pargeter) and her fiancé Liam Cavanagh (Jonny McPherson), who are returning from a murder mystery event at Debbie's hotel in Weatherfield. Their taxi is driven by Tim Metcalfe (Joe Duttine), who surveys the scene with horror. As a doctor, Liam runs to help others while Chas searches for her son Aaron. Another vehicle in the queue is a van driven by Jai Sharma (Chris Bisson), whom Steve at first mistakes for his old friend Vikram Desai (Bisson played both characters). Unknown to Jai, local drug dealer and abuser Ray Walters is dead in the back of the van. A second van, driven by a man in a mysterious black balaclava and hoodie, reveals a woman tied and begging to be released in the back. She eventually makes her escape and heads into the same woods John had earlier fled into.

In the woods, Robert runs into Kit, who berates him for going after John; John appears and knocks Kit out. Robert confronts John and promises that Aaron does not, and will not ever, love him. As they argue and insult one another, a fight over John's shotgun begins, which leads to Cain being shot in the stomach. John escapes and Kit pursues him whilst Robert gets Cain to hospital.

The unnamed woman flees through the woods, while her captor walks along the road and sees Joe lying unconscious. Kit pursues the woman, thinking it is John; when he calls for her to stop, she runs straight into a tree. Kit checks on her and as he reassures her that he is a police officer, he sees her hands are bound. She has a tattoo of a tree on her wrist.

The scene cuts to the hospital and Shona, who has an identical tattoo between her shoulders, discovers her waters have broken. David runs to find a doctor whilst Charity, who has just shared a lift with Carla, comforts Shona. David returns only to collapse in a severe epileptic fit, with Shona screaming his name and being held back by Charity. Elsewhere in the hospital, Eric Pollard (Chris Chittell), who has arrived to find his adoptive grandson Jacob, meets Tracy's adoptive father Ken Barlow (William Roache), and they commiserate over the troublesome vending machine. Cain is seen in hospital, with Moira at his side, discussing going away together on a very belated honeymoon. Kevin is seen visiting Carl, who is lying in bed intubated, and tells him he saw Carl driving and knows Debbie is innocent.

In a montage, Debbie sits with Abi when her new husband Ronnie arrives, and they tearfully hug one another. Charity and Sarah sit by Mackenzie's bedside, both their hands resting on Charity's bump. Carl is seen flatlining and the doctors and nurses rush in, watched through the window by Kevin. Robert and Aaron sit together in the waiting room, both safe and well. Todd sits alone outside a hospital room, only for Billy's adopted daughter Summer Spellman (Harriet Bibby) to arrive; she breaks down in floods of tears and wails in his arms as his friend Sarah Platt (Tina O'Brien) comforts them both. Theo moves to sit beside Todd, and Todd struggles to take it all in. Joe is seen lying in a hospital bed, and the masked man is shown making a phone call saying that he will not be continuing the job he was given; the camera pans to reveal it is Graham Foster (Andrew Scarborough), Joe's former legal guardian who is long believed to have been murdered. Finally, John is shown dead in the woods, his shotgun beside him. Standing over him is his younger sister Victoria Sugden (Isabel Hodgins), looking horrified as the gravity of what she has done sinks in.

A doctor talks over the montage, telling somebody that their injuries are recoverable, but the scans have revealed something else: a cancerous mass. The camera pans to reveal it is Cain who the doctor is talking to, with Moira still at his side. The doctor tells Cain that the cancer may not be a death sentence, but the outcome still may not be good. The episode ends with Tim giving Chas a lift home in the aftermath of the crash, asking her if Emmerdale was "where the plane crashed?". She asks him what part of Manchester he comes from, and Tim promptly replies: "You won't have heard of it".

== Cast and characters ==
On 21 November 2025, it was announced on This Morning that viewers would be able to vote for one of four combinations of Coronation Street and Emmerdale characters to interact during the Corriedale special: Alison King (Carla Connor in Coronation Street) and Emma Atkins (Charity Dingle in Emmerdale), Kate Ford (Tracy McDonald in Coronation Street) and Michael Parr (Ross Barton in Emmerdale), David Neilson (Roy Cropper in Coronation Street) and Nicola Wheeler (Nicola King in Emmerdale), or Andy Whyment (Kirk Sutherland in Coronation Street) and James Hooton (Sam Dingle in Emmerdale). Voting is expected to open on 1 January 2026. On 16 December 2025, ITV announced the full cast list expected to appear in the episode. ITV also announced that Olivia Frances-Brown had joined the cast for the special episode as Jodie, but gave no further details as to how her character was connected to the plot. Chris Bisson, who plays Jai Sharma in Emmerdale, will also appear. This caused producers some concern that he may be confused with Vikram Desai, a character he played in Coronation Street from 1999 to 2002, but Bisson suggested that Steve McDonald (Simon Gregson) could mistake Jai as Vikram and do a double-take.

=== Coronation Street ===
- Tanisha Gorey as Asha Alahan
- Jason Callender as James Bailey
- Vinta Morgan as Ronnie Bailey
- William Roache as Ken Barlow
- Alison King as Carla Connor
- Jacob Roberts as DC Kit Green
- Gareth Pierce as Todd Grimshaw
- Olivia Frances-Brown as Jodie
- Daniel Brocklebank as Billy Mayhew
- Joe Duttine as Tim Metcalfe
- Simon Gregson as Steve McDonald
- Kate Ford as Tracy McDonald
- Jack P. Shepherd as David Platt
- Tina O'Brien as Sarah Platt
- Julia Goulding as Shona Platt
- Claire Sweeney as Cassie Plummer
- James Cartwright as Theo Silverton
- Harriet Bibby as Summer Spellman
- Amy Cudden as Becky Swain
- Sydney Martin as Betsy Swain
- Vicky Myers as DS Lisa Swain
- Sally Carman-Duttine as Abi Webster
- Jonathan Howard as Carl Webster
- Sue Devaney as Debbie Webster
- Michael Le Vell as Kevin Webster

=== Emmerdale ===
- Lawrence Robb as Mackenzie Boyd
- Jonny McPherson as Liam Cavanagh
- Danny Miller as Aaron Dingle
- Jeff Hordley as Cain Dingle
- Emma Atkins as Charity Dingle
- Lucy Pargeter as Chas Dingle
- Natalie J. Robb as Moira Dingle
- Andrew Scarborough as Graham Foster
- Joe-Warren Plant as Jacob Gallagher
- Chris Chittell as Eric Pollard
- Chris Bisson as Jai Sharma
- Oliver Farnworth as John Sugden
- Ryan Hawley as Robert Sugden
- Katie Hill as Sarah Sugden
- Isabel Hodgins as Victoria Sugden
- Ned Porteous as Joe Tate
- Joe Absolom as Ray Walters

== Reception ==
The episode was longlisted for "Best Showstopper" at the 2026 Inside Soap Awards.

== See also ==
- East Street, a charity crossover mini-episode between Coronation Street and EastEnders for Children in Need
