= Olivia Frances-Brown =

English actress (born 1998)

Olivia Frances-Brown (born 20 December 1998) is an English actress, and singer-songwriter.

== Life and career ==
Frances-Brown was born 20 December 1998 in Liverpool. She began acting in 2003, with notable roles in Reputation (2024), before joining the cast of Coronation Street in 2026, where she portrays Jodie Ramsey. She also appeared in the Coronation Street/Emmerdale crossover special, Corriedale.

== Personal life ==
She was formerly engaged to James Nelson-Joyce. She had a brief relationship with Coronation Street actor Jonathan Howard.

She is a Jazz singer and performs in Liverpool.
