= Sydney Martin (actress) =

English actress (born 2001)

- Born: Sydney-Leigh Martin; 18 October 2001 (age 24); Bury, Greater Manchester, England
- Occupation: Actress
- Years active: 2024–present

Sydney-Leigh Martin (born 18 October 2001) is an English actress, known for portraying the role of Betsy Swain on the ITV soap opera Coronation Street since 2024.

== Life and career ==
Sydney-Leigh Martin was born on 18 October 2001 in Bury, Greater Manchester. Prior to acting, Sydney worked in Tesco and handed her notice in after landing her role in Coronation Street. She also appeared as Guardian Ganton in the feature film Assassin's Guild.

In June 2024, Sydney joined the cast of ITV soap opera Coronation Street as Betsy Swain. Her character was initially introduced as an unnamed friend of Sabrina Adetiba (Luana Santos). She was subsequently established as the daughter of DS Lisa Swain (Vicky Myers). Since joining the soap, her storylines have included her character blackmailing Joel Deering (Calum Lill) and the discovery that her mother Becky Swain (Amy Cudden) is still alive after believing her to be dead. In 2025, she appeared in a short film Through the Eyes of Bairns as a young adult Rose. In 2026, she is set to appear in a short film titled Favourite alongside Hollyoaks actress Isabelle Smith.

== Filmography ==
Year	Title	Role	Notes	Ref.
2024	Assassin's Guild	Guardian Ganton	Film	
2024–present	Coronation Street	Betsy Swain	Regular role	
2025	Through the Eyes of Bairns	Young Adult Rose	Short film	
2026	Corriedale	Betsy Swain	Spin-off	
2026	Favourite	Mel	Short film	
