= James Cartwright (actor) =

English actor (born 1984)

- Born: James Lewis Cartwright; 22 October 1984 (age 41); Bolton, Greater Manchester, England
- Occupation: Actor
- Years active: 2001–present
- Television: The Story of Tracy Beaker; Coronation Street

James Lewis Cartwright (born 22 October 1984) is an English actor, known for portraying the roles of Nathan Jones in the CBBC children's television series The Story of Tracy Beaker (2003–2004), Harrison Burns in the BBC Radio 4 radio soap opera The Archers (2014–present) and Theo Silverton in the ITV1 soap opera Coronation Street (2025–2026).

== Life and career ==
James Lewis Cartwright was born on 22 October 1984 in Bolton, Greater Manchester, and was raised in Chorley, Lancashire. He made his acting debut in 2001, appearing in an episode of The Bill, as well as the television film Vacuuming Completely Nude in Paradise. The following year, he appeared in the short film Function at the Junction and was in an episode of the BBC drama series Clocking Off. In 2003, Cartwright joined the cast of the second series of CBBC children's television series The Story of Tracy Beaker as trainee care worker Nathan Jones. He made his final appearance during the final episode of the third series, as well as appearing in Tracy Beaker: The Movie of Me and the Children in Need special Tracy Beaker Parties with Pudsey the same year. He made various guest roles over the next decade including in Outlaws, Blackpool, Doctors, The Afternoon Play, Casualty and Minder, as well as appearing as Kev in five episodes of Hollyoaks Later, a spin-off of the Channel 4 soap opera Hollyoaks. In 2012, Cartwright was charged with grievous bodily harm and ultimately given a 18-month suspended sentence after punching a man in a nightclub. He also appeared in the film Vinyl.

In 2014, Cartwright joined the BBC Radio 4 soap opera The Archers as Sergeant Harrison Burns, member of the local police force. He went on to appear in various guest roles including Love, Lies and Records (2017), Father Brown (2019) and the film adaption of Downton Abbey (2019). In 2019, he appeared as John, King of England in Glow and Darkness. He also appeared in Dalgliesh (2021) and Sister Boniface Mysteries (2024). In 2025, Cartwright joined the cast of the ITV1 soap opera Coronation Street as Theo Silverton. His storylines have included the character's hidden sexuality and affair with Todd Grimshaw (Gareth Pierce), who he then begins to domestically abuse, as well as leaving Billy Mayhew (Daniel Brocklebank) to die during the crossover episode Corriedale.

== Filmography ==
Year	Title	Role	Notes
2001	The Bill	Red	Episode: "The Dark Side"
2001	Vacuuming Completely Nude in Paradise	De Kid	Film role
2002	Function at the Junction	Tony Callow	Short film
2002	Clocking Off	Daniel Preston	Episode: "Alan's Story"
2003–2004	The Story of Tracy Beaker	Nathan Jones	Main role
2004	Tracy Beaker: The Movie of Me	Nathan Jones	Television film
2004	Tracy Beaker Parties with Pudsey	Nathan Jones	Spin-off
2004	Doctors	Stevie Smith	Episode: "One Foot in the Grave"
2004	Outlaws	Mark Eliot	Episode: "A Life of Grime"
2004	Blackpool	Mike Hooley	2 episodes
2005	The Fantastic Escape	Guard #1	Short film
2006	Missing	The Hacker	Television mini-series
2007	The Afternoon Play	Johnny	Episode: "Johnny Shakespeare"
2007	Instinct	Jogger	Television film
2007	Casualty	Patrick Foxwell	Episode: "Lost in the Rough"
2009	Minder	Neil Butler	Episode: "In Vino Veritas"
2009	The Chapel	Man	Short film
2009	Hollyoaks Later	Kev	5 episodes
2011	Holby City	Johnnie Marks	Episode: "Running the Gauntlet"
2012	Vinyl	Jimmy Breen	Film
2012	The Farmer's Wife	Auctioneer	Short film
2013	Dracula	Messenger Boy	Episode: "From Darkness to Light"
2017	Love, Lies and Records	Gavin	1 episode
2014–present	The Archers	Sgt. Harrison Burns	Regular role
2015	Doctors	Brad Conley	Episode: "Trust Me I'm a Doctor"
2016	BBC Breakfast	Himself	Guest; 1 episode
2019	Granada Reports	Himself	Guest; 1 episode
2019	Father Brown	Jimbo Riley	Episode: "The Demise of Debutante"
2019	Downton Abbey	Tony Sellick	Film
2020	Steph's Packed Lunch	Sgt. Harrison Burns	Guest; 1 episode
2021	Glow and Darkness	John, King of England	Main role
2021	Dalgliesh	Stephen Lampart	2 episodes
2024	Sister Boniface Mysteries	Humphrey Lash	Episode: "It's Just Not Cricket"
2025	Lorraine	Himself	Guest; 1 episode
2025–2026	Coronation Street	Theo Silverton	Regular role
