= Farrel Hegarty =

English actress (born 1988)

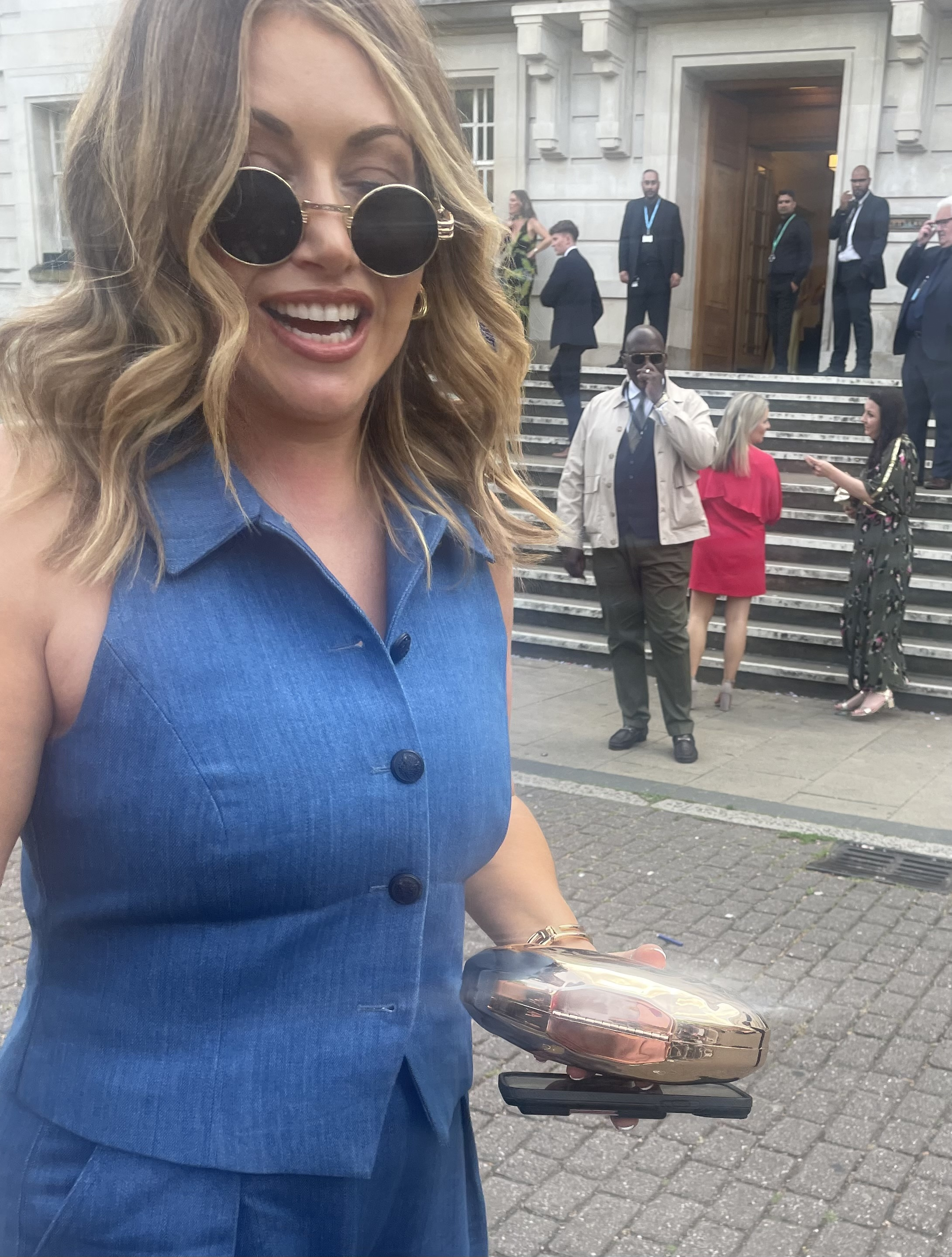
- Hegarty at the 2025 British Soap Awards
- Born: Farrel Jo Hegarty; 27 January 1988 (age 38); Wakefield, West Yorkshire, England
- Education: East 15 Acting School (BA Hons)
- Occupations: Actress; internet personality
- Years active: 2010–present
- Television: Coronation Street

Farrel Jo Hegarty (born 27 January 1988) is an English actress and social media personality. She is known for her role as Lou Michaelis in the ITV1 soap opera Coronation Street (2025–2026). She is also a content creator on TikTok, as well as having appeared in various stage productions across the UK.

== Life and career ==
Farrel Jo Hegarty was born on 27 January 1988 in Wakefield, West Yorkshire. She studied at East 15 Acting School, graduating with a BA Hons in 2010. Hegarty is a lesbian and is in a relationship with a woman who lives in Australia. Her first television role was in an episode of the ITV soap opera Emmerdale in 2014. She went on to appear in a series of short films, with minor roles in the films My Dinner with Hervé and Big Boys Don't Cry. In 2021, she appeared in episode of Murder, They Hope; the following year, she played a receptionist in the film The Pay Day. In 2024, she appeared in episodes of The Dating Game and Brassic, as well as a short film Silent Night. Hegarty is also a content creator on TikTok, often sharing sketch videos.

In February 2025, Hegarty joined the cast of the ITV soap opera Coronation Street as Lou Michaelis. She debuted alongside her husband Mick Michaelis (Joe Layton) and is subsequently revealed as the mother of Brody Michaelis (Ryan Mulvey), who is in a young offender's institution. Brody's paternity is subsequently revealed not to be Mick, but Kit Green (Jacob Roberts). Her character was sent to prison in July 2025, with Hegarty departing the show before returning in February 2026.

== Filmography ==
Year	Title	Role	Notes
2014	Emmerdale	Laura Atkinson	1 episode
2014	AppyEverAftR	—N/a	Television film
2015	Edit/Undo	Sarah Conway	Short film
2016	Date	Waitress	Short film
2018	My Dinner with Hervé	Woman in Pub	Film
2019	Coronation Street	Reporter	1 episode
2020	The Wedding Dance	Emma	Short film
2020	Big Boys Don't Cry	Club Girl #2	Film
2020	The Wedding Dance	Emma	Short film
2021	Murder, They Hope	Jemima	Episode: "Dales of the Unexpected"
2022	The Pay Day	Receptionist Rebecca	Film
2024	The Dating Game	Tracy	Episode: "Terrance & Tracy"
2024	Brassic	Hayley Carver	Episode: "Two Funerals and a Wedding"
2024	Silent Night	Laura	Short film
2025–2026	Coronation Street	Lou Michaelis	Regular role

== Stage ==
Year	Title	Role	Venue
2010	Mixed Up North	Bella	Tristan Bates Theatre
2011	The Little Big Club	Danni	UK tour
2012	Soap Opera	Jan	UK tour
2013	Stand	Vicky	UK tour
2014	Hello Norma Jean	Marilyn Monroe	King's Head Theatre
2016	Hello Norma Jean	Marilyn Monroe	The Park Theatre
2019	Stags and Hens	Bernadette	Stockwell Playhouse
