= Ryan Mulvey =

English actor (born 2006)

- Born: January 2006 (age 20); Altrincham, Greater Manchester, England
- Occupation: Actor
- Years active: 2023–present
- Television: Hollyoaks; Coronation Street

Ryan Patrick Mulvey (born January 2006) is an English actor, known for portraying the roles of JJ Osborne in the Channel 4 soap opera Hollyoaks (2024–2025) and Brody Michaelis in the ITV1 soap opera Coronation Street (2025–present).

== Life and career ==
Ryan Patrick Mulvey was born in January 2006 in Altrincham, Greater Manchester, and studied at TMC Performing Arts. His father Eamon Mulvey is a senior academy coach for Manchester United F.C.. In November 2023, it was announced he would be joining the Channel 4 soap opera Hollyoaks, as the son of Darren Osborne. He arrives alongside his mother Suzanne Ashworth (Suzanne Hall) and sister Frankie Osborne (Isabelle Smith). It is subsequently revealed that his character had been sexually abusing his sister. It won Best Storyline at the 2025 British Soap Awards. He departed in January 2025, after being found guilty of the abuse, with the character being killed off screen later in the year.

Following his departure from Hollyoaks, Mulvey joined the cast of the ITV1 soap opera Coronation Street as Brody Michaelis, who is in a young offender's institution alongside Dylan Wilson (Liam McCheyne). He is later established as the son of Lou Michaelis (Farrel Hegarty) and Kit Green (Jacob Roberts), after his paternity is revealed to be not Mick Michaelis (Joe Layton), as initially thought. For his role as Brody, he was nominated for two awards at the 2025 Inside Soap Awards.

== Filmography ==
Year	Title	Role	Notes	Ref.
2024–2025	Hollyoaks	JJ Osborne	Regular role	
2025–present	Coronation Street	Brody Michaelis	Regular role	

== Awards and nominations ==
Year	Award	Category	Work	Result	Ref.
2025	Inside Soap Awards	Best Newcomer	Coronation Street	Nominated	
2025	Inside Soap Awards	Best Young Performer	Coronation Street	Nominated	
