= List of Coronation Street characters introduced in 2025 =

Coronation Street is a British soap opera first broadcast on ITV on 9 December 1960. This is a list of characters that made their first appearance in 2025. The first character to appear in January was Mandy Waring (Rebecca Atkinson), a prison guard who had a brief relationship with Rob Donovan (Marc Baylis) and helped him escape from prison. She was followed by Brie Benson (Jessica Ellis), the cellmate of Lauren Bolton (Cait Fitton), and Steven Poyser (Samuel James). A new family consisting of Lou (Farrel Hegarty) and Mick Michaelis (Joe Layton) debuted in February. They were followed in March by Lou's son Brody (Ryan Mulvey), who is cellmate of Dylan Wilson (Liam McCheyne). Later in March, Theo Silverton (James Cartwright) arrived as a new love interest for Todd Grimshaw (Gareth Pierce) and Laila Bailey, the daughter of Dee Dee Bailey (Channique Sterling Brown) and Joel Deering (Calum Lill). In April, Wes Fuller (Kevin Finn) made his first appearance, followed by Danielle Silverton (Natalie Anderson), the wife of Theo. Carl Webster, the half-brother of Kevin (Michael Le Vell) and Debbie Webster (Sue Devaney), also made his first appearance in April 2025. Additionally, several other characters appeared throughout the year.

== Mandy Waring ==
Mandy Waring
- Coronation Street character
- Portrayed by: Rebecca Atkinson
- First appearance: Episode 11,467/8; 13 January 2025
- Last appearance: Episode 11,521/2; 18 March 2025
- Introduced by: Verity MacLeod
In-universe information
- Occupation: Prison guard
- Mother: Sheila Waring
- Daughters: Connie Waring

Mandy Waring, played by Rebecca Atkinson, is a prison guard who appeared in scenes with Rob Donovan (Marc Baylis) and Matty Radcliffe (Seamus McGoff). She first appeared on 13 January 2025. Upon her first appearance, she was held hostage by Matty alongside Rob and his son, Bobby Crawford (Jack Carroll), who was visiting him. A source said: "Rebecca is a hugely talented actress and she's a great addition to the cast. She's joined for a short stint and will be on screen for a few months while the storyline she's involved with plays out." This was Atkinson's second role in Coronation Street after playing Stephanie Mills in 2002.

On 24 February 2026, it was announced that Mandy had a baby with Rob named Connie who is left on the doorstep of Rob's half-sister Carla Connor (Alison King) and Lisa Swain (Vicky Myers). A source told Digital Spy: "Carla's brother Rob had a fling with a prison guard called Mandy. Baby Connie is a result of that ill-fated fumble behind bars – which makes her Carla's niece. Little Connie's grandmother is heading into hospital for a while, so is sneakily trying to leave the tot with Carla to babysit and flee before she can refuse."

== Brie Benson ==
Brie Benson
- Coronation Street character
- Portrayed by: Jessica Ellis
- First appearance: Episode 11,469/70; 15 January 2025
- Last appearance: Episode 11,473/4; 20 January 2025
- Introduced by: Verity MacLeod

Brie Benson, played by Jessica Ellis, made her first appearance on 15 January 2025 as an inmate in prison where Lauren Bolton (Cait Fitton) is serving time for the murder of Joel Deering (Calum Lill). Ellis' guest role was announced on 7 January 2025 and is expected to last several episodes. Stefania Sarrubba from Digital Spy revealed: "The details of Ellis' stint on the cobbles are being kept under wraps, but we know her character Brie won't go easy on Lauren." Sarrubba also revealed: "As Lauren's trial begins, Brie tells her that her baby son Frankie would be better off without her." James Hibbs from Radio Times revealed that Brie would be seen "purposefully antagonising her in prison."

Ellis made her final appearance on 20 January 2025 and announced her departure on Instagram saying: "Well I had to get a picture in that iconic coat didn't I?" and "As a Manchester gal, what a moment in my career to get to be in the most iconic soap that I grew up with Coronation Street."

== Steven Poyser ==
Steven Poyser, played by Samuel James, is a solicitor leading the prosecution Lauren Bolton's (Cait Fitton) court case. James' casting was announced on 15 January 2025 and he made his first appearance on 17 January 2025. A source told The Mirror: "Samuel will appear on screen for a number of episodes in a guest role as Lauren's fate is finally revealed." This would be James' second role in Coronation Street after portraying a prosecution barrister named Mr. Pack in 2020. Around the time of James' casting, many regular characters were leaving the soap or had been axed by the producers, which Lauren Morris of The Mirror addressed when announcing the casting: "Despite the ongoing cast cull, Corrie has signed up EastEnders star Samuel James, according to reports." Morris also described James' character to play a "big role" in Lauren's storyline.

== Lou Michaelis ==
Lou Michaelis
- Coronation Street character
- Portrayed by: Farrel Hegarty; Charlotte Alex-Riley (2025; flashbacks)
- Duration: 2025–2026
- First appearance: Episode 11,491/2; 12 February 2025
- Last appearance: Episode 11827; 3 April 2026
- Introduced by: Kate Brooks
In-universe information
- Other names: Louise Michaelis
- Husband: Mick Michaelis
- Sons: Brody Michaelis
- Daughters: Joanie Michaelis; Shanice Michaelis

Lou Michaelis, portrayed by Farrel Hegarty, made her first appearance on 12 February 2025 as part of Coronation Street's new family. She and her husband, Mick Michaelis (Joe Layton), were announced in December 2024, with it being explained that Mick and Lou are a married couple that would first connect with established character Chesney Winter-Brown (Sam Aston) as they would come to live nearby him at the fictional Mawdsley Street, which is nearby to Coronation Street. Brooks described Mick and Lou as "livewires" and "ruffians" that would cause a lot of damage, chaos and trouble, and teased that they would open up the "floodgates" and explore the backstory of established character Kit Green (Jacob Roberts). Brooks revealed that she and the team were very excited by their arrival, explaining, "They come in with oodles of drama and they are shaking things up. They're neighbours from hell. They're overfamiliar, likeable and they've got kids. Initially they develop a friendship with Chesney and [his wife] Gemma (Dolly-Rose Campbell), but there are other things to unpack. I wouldn't want to get on the wrong side of them – especially Mick!" She also teased that they would come in "all guns blazing" and leave a "a trail of devastation", but called them "really enjoyable", adding, "They have a charm to them, but they do and say things that you shouldn't!" Whilst the pair's casting was not revealed at the time of the announcement, Brooks believed that the characters were portrayed by "brilliant actors". Following Mick and Lou's debuts, Chloe Timms from Inside Soap joked that she was happy to watch the couple as long as she did not have to "live next door to them".

On 30 January 2025, it was announced that Hegarty would be playing the role of Lou alongside Joe Layton, who would portray Mick. Her and Mick have been billed as a "nightmare couple", with Daniel Kilkelly from Digital Spy describing them to be a "chaotic couple". It has also been revealed that Lou will strike up a friendship with who recognise each other from Bessie Street School, where Lou's two daughters attend alongside Gemma Winter-Brown's (Dolly-Rose Campbell) quads. Kilkelly also revealed: "Show bosses have warned that Coronation Street's residents should watch their backs, as Mick and Lou will make life difficult for anyone who crosses them." Kilkelly also revealed that the pair also have a connection with Gemma's half-brother Kit Green (Jacob Roberts). Hegarty spoke about her casting: "I'm delighted and so grateful to be joining the cast of Coronation Street. I have genuinely been blown away by how ridiculously warm and nice everyone is. Lou is definitely an exciting character to play because she's got good and bad parts to her, she's a life force and full of beans. She's a very colourful person who likes to make waves and try to cause chaos. But she also has that strong family loyalty, especially between Mick and Lou. They are thick as thieves and will stick up for each other, even when they probably shouldn't." Coronation Street executive producer, Kate Brooks also spoke about their castings: "Chaotic and loud, Mick and Lou bulldoze their way into Weatherfield, causing absolute carnage for the residents of Coronation Street. Their relationship is volatile to say the least, but at the heart of it lies a fierce sense of family loyalty, and woe betide anyone who tries to come between them. Although they're the life and soul of any party, they're equally not everyone's cup of tea, and they soon find themselves at the root of some explosive drama. We're thrilled to introduce these new characters into the mix, and the cobbles certainly won't be quiet with this family around."

On 10 March 2025, it was announced that Lou would appear in flashback scenes to 2007 which show Bernie Winter (Jane Hazlegrove) trying to make contact with her son Kit, who she gave up for adoption after he was born. In these scenes, it was announced that Charlotte Alex-Riley would play the younger version of Lou.

On 31 March 2025, it was announced that Hegarty would be leaving the role of Lou with her on-screen husband Mick, whose departure was announced one week prior. Lou and Mick are set to depart after a "major storyline". A Coronation Street insider confirmed both exits: "Mick and Lou were brought into the show to cause chaos on the cobbles in the build up to a major storyline in the summer and they are already making their presence felt. Joe and Farrel were contracted for a specific length of time, some characters come in for a long time and some like Mick and Lou are brought to pass through and leave a trail of destruction behind them. Both actors are still filming with the show and will be on screen until the summer."

== Mick Michaelis ==
Mick Michaelis
- Coronation Street character
- Portrayed by: Joe Layton; Lewis Walton (2025; flashbacks)
- First appearance: Episode 11,493/4; 14 February 2025
- Last appearance: Episode 11,616; 16 July 2025
- Introduced by: Kate Brooks
In-universe information
- Other names: Mark Michaelis
- Wife: Lou Michaelis
- Daughters: Joanie Michaelis; Shanice Michaelis
- Adoptive sons: Brody Michaelis

Mick Michaelis portrayed by Joe Layton, made his first appearance on 14 February 2025 as part of Coronation Street's new family. He and his wife, Lou Michaelis (Farrel Hegarty), were announced in December 2024, with it being explained that Mick and Lou are a married couple that would first connect with established character Chesney Winter-Brown (Sam Aston) as they would come to live nearby him at the fictional Maudsley Street, which is nearby to Coronation Street. Brooks described Mick and Lou as "livewires" and "ruffians" that would cause a lot of damage, chaos and trouble, and teased that they would open up the "floodgates" and explore the backstory of established character Kit Green (Jacob Roberts). Brooks revealed that she and the team were very excited by their arrival, explaining, "They come in with oodles of drama and they are shaking things up. They're neighbours from hell. They're overfamiliar, likeable and they've got kids. Initially they develop a friendship with Chesney and [his wife] Gemma (Dolly-Rose Campbell), but there are other things to unpack. I wouldn't want to get on the wrong side of them – especially Mick!" She also teased that they would come in "all guns blazing" and leave a "a trail of devastation", but called them "really enjoyable", adding, "They have a charm to them, but they do and say things that you shouldn't!" Whilst the pair's casting was not revealed at the time of the announcement, Brooks believed that the characters were portrayed by "brilliant actors".

On 30 January 2025, it was announced that Layton would be playing the role of Mick alongside Farrel Hegarty, who would portray Lou. Her and Mick have been billed as a "nightmare couple", with Daniel Kilkelly from Digital Spy describing them to be a "chaotic couple". It has also been revealed that Mick is the man in the silver van who has been tormenting Chesney in recent weeks. Chesney is oblivious to who Mick really is, but as they move into a house over the ginnel from him and Gemma, the truth would soon be revealed. Kilkelly also revealed: "Show bosses have warned that Coronation Street's residents should watch their backs, as Mick and Lou will make life difficult for anyone who crosses them." Kilkelly also revealed that the pair also have a connection with Gemma's half-brother Kit Green (Jacob Roberts). Layton spoke about his casting: "Coronation Street is such an institute in British television and to get to walk down the cobbles in Mick's shoes is so exciting. To also do it alongside Farrel is awesome – we are having great fun together and connecting really well whilst developing our characters. It also gives the opportunity to get a look behind the curtain of this huge machine and be a small cog within the big picture of Coronation Street and to work alongside people who take such pride in their work. It's just a really happy place, friendly and welcoming. I'm going to relish every moment of it." Coronation Street executive producer, Kate Brooks also spoke about their castings: "Chaotic and loud, Mick and Lou bulldoze their way into Weatherfield, causing absolute carnage for the residents of Coronation Street. Their relationship is volatile to say the least, but at the heart of it lies a fierce sense of family loyalty, and woe betide anyone who tries to come between them. Although they're the life and soul of any party, they're equally not everyone's cup of tea, and they soon find themselves at the root of some explosive drama. We're thrilled to introduce these new characters into the mix, and the cobbles certainly won't be quiet with this family around."

On 24 March 2025, it was announced that Layton had quit the role one month after his first appearance. Laura Denby from Radio Times reported: "Joe Layton will be bowing out in the summer." An insider confirmed that Mick's exit would be "no shock, no surprise" for those involved. They continued: "He will be on screen until late July, so [there is] lots more story to come." A week later, it was announced that Hegarty was also leaving the soap. A Coronation Street insider confirmed both exits: "Mick and Lou were brought into the show to cause chaos on the cobbles in the build up to a major storyline in the summer and they are already making their presence felt. Joe and Farrel were contracted for a specific length of time, some characters come in for a long time and some like Mick and Lou are brought to pass through and leave a trail of destruction behind them. Both actors are still filming with the show and will be on screen until the summer."

On 4 May 2025, it was announced that a younger version of Mick would be played by Lewis Walton as he appears alongside younger versions of Lou and Kit Green (Jacob Roberts).

== Brody Michaelis ==
Brody Michaelis
- Coronation Street character
- Portrayed by: Ryan Mulvey
- Duration: 2025–present
- First appearance: Episode 11,503/4; 26 February 2025
- Introduced by: Kate Brooks
In-universe information
- Father: Kit Green
- Mother: Lou Michaelis
- Adoptive father: Mick Michaelis; Tim Metcalfe (foster)
- Adoptive mother: Sally Metcalfe (foster)
- Half-sisters: Joanie Michaelis; Shanice Michaelis
- Grandmothers: Bernie Winter
- Uncles: Paul Foreman
- Aunts: Gemma Winter
- First cousins: Aled Winter-Brown; Bryn Winter-Brown; Carys Winter-Brown; Llio Winter-Brown
- Other relatives: Celeste Butterfield

Brody Michaelis, played by Ryan Mulvey, is the son of Kit Green (Jacob Roberts) and Lou Michaelis (Farrel Hegarty). He is first introduced as an inmate at the Secure Training Centre where Dylan Wilson (Liam McCheyne) is sentenced for possessing a knife that led to Mason Radcliffe (Luca Toolan) being fatally stabbed by his brothers Logan (Harry Lowbridge) and Matty Radcliffe (Seamus McGoff). He made his first appearance on 26 February 2025. Mulvey's casting was announced on 10 February 2025, a month after departing Channel 4 soap opera Hollyoaks as JJ Osborne. Brody approaches Dylan in the STC after he notices him interact with teacher and neighbour Daniel Osbourne (Rob Mallard), who is teaching at the facility. Brody advises Dylan to keep quiet so he does not become a target for bullying. Daniel Kilkelly from Digital Spy described: "Brody's concerns prove to be well-founded, as Dylan starts to receive a hard time from the other inmates. Dylan is defended by Brody, who scares the others off and encourages Dylan to stay by his side while he settles in."

On 3 April 2025, it was announced that Brody is in fact the son of Lou Michaelis (Farrel Hegarty), and despite being raised by her husband Mick Michaelis (Joe Layton), his father is Kit Green (Jacob Roberts). This storyline is set to be "explosive". Liam McCheyne, who plays Dylan said "it's been great" working with Mulvey, despite their "tense relationship" in the show. He continued to explain: "We did have a laugh, however, as they film differently on Hollyoaks. So on Ryan's first day we did two scenes in two hours, and he couldn't believe it worked so quickly here. I was like, 'Yep, get used to it!'" In August 2025, Lou was sentenced to four years imprisonment after her attack on Gary Windass (Mikey North). Brody, along with Joanie and Shanice were placed in the care of Sally (Sally Dynevor) and Tim Metcalfe (Joe Duttine). Coronation Street cast former Emmerdale actress Glenda McKay as psychologist Alison Hale who visits them along with a social worker. An insider told Digital Spy: "The news that Brody, Joanie, and Shanice can all stay together with support from Tim and Sally is a huge relief for Brody - he hated the thought of his little sisters being separated. Despite Brody's hardman act, he cares deeply for his family and only wants what's best for them. Just when it seems like all is well, though, the scream shocks everyone. This could destroy Brody if it affects the custody decision..."

== Theo Silverton ==
Theo Silverton
- Coronation Street character
- Portrayed by: James Cartwright
- Duration: 2025–2026
- First appearance: Episode 11,525/6; 25 March 2025
- Last appearance: Episode 11,884; 22 June 2026
- Introduced by: Kate Brooks
- Crossover appearances: Corriedale (2026)
In-universe information
- Occupation: Scaffolder
- Husband: Todd Grimshaw (2026)
- Wife: Danielle Silverton (until 2025)
- Sons: Miles Silverton
- Daughters: Millie Silverton

Theo Silverton, portrayed by James Cartwright, is a scaffolder who made his first appearance on 25 March 2025. Cartwright's casting was announced on 9 March 2025, alongside two other characters. Upon arrival, he gets on the wrong side of Julie Carp (Katy Cavanagh) and George Shuttleworth (Tony Maudsley). Todd Grimshaw (Gareth Pierce) tries to help patch things up with the locals. Todd instantly becomes attracted to Theo, but Iona Rowan from Digital Spy describes that Theo "plays his cards close to his chest." Upon his character, Cartwright teased: "I think Theo is a good guy, he comes in with the best of intentions, as most people do, but he may upset some people with his behaviour."

On 23 March 2025, two days before Theo's debut, it was revealed that Pierce, who plays Todd, had previously worked with Cartwright before Coronation Street on another soap, The Archers, on BBC Radio 4. Pierce told Digital Spy: "But we were also in The Archers together. In fact, just pre-Covid, we were one of the last lot in studio where we were waiting for Boris Johnson's announcement to close down production. And so those actors of us that were still in the studio in Birmingham, we were just being fired rewrites because they just wanted to record as much as possible of The Archers with who was there. Because we didn't really know, it was such a fast emerging situation." It was also confirmed that there would be a romance between Todd and Theo, which Pierce said their previous work together had "definitely helped" with their on-screen relationship. Pierce continued: "But we haven't worked together loads, so that also means that in terms of Todd and Theo meeting and the early parts of the relationship, it's not like you know each other really well, so you can utilise that. But it's been great. James is a lovely, lovely actor. He has been brilliant, he's hit the ground running, and it definitely helps that we know each other."

As Todd and Theo begin to build a relationship, it is revealed that Theo has a wife named Danielle (Natalie Anderson), who appeared to arrange her mother's funeral with Todd and George Shuttleworth (Tony Maudsley). On 12 April 2025, it was revealed that Theo also has two teenage children named Miles (Lewis William Magee) and Millie (Kaitlyn Earley), who appear on 14 April 2025. Regarding his family unit, Cartwright explained: "He's a good, honest family man. There's two versions of it [the scenario]. There's the version where [Danielle] turns around and goes, 'I've always known' or 'Okay, darling, if that's what you feel, I love you'. And the daughter looks up at you adoringly and goes, 'Dad, I know it's a lot of change, but I'm here to support you'. That's version one, but that's not good Coronation Street, is it?" He continued: "And there's version two, where the wife goes, 'I'm going to make this as difficult as possible', and the daughter goes, 'I'm going to make this as tricky as possible'. They're not going to make it easy because they're not happy. It's an enormous amount of stress." Cartwright also expressed how Theo's decisions have effected him: "Theo's leaving his wife and kids for it. It's a very strong bond. It's one of those times in life where it's 'all in'. They're both sacrificing an enormous amount to make it work. Todd is taking all this baggage from this man. He continued: "On the other hand, he's lost his family [and] he's getting mocked on the scaffolding site. So they're all in, and they're going to really have a good crack at making this work, on this journey to domestic bliss between the scaffolder and the undertaker."

On 1 May 2025, it was announced that there would be a change for Theo and Todd's storyline. Cartwright explained his character's background and why he's kept his sexuality hidden: "He's from a devoutly religious background, and that's what's made him keep it in. For the first time in Todd, it's more than sexual. I think it's a man who Theo met and he's gone, 'Oh my God, you're a dear friend, but also I fancy you', which is how we choose all our partners, right? You just go, 'I fancy you, but actually we get on and you like me back, and you want to look after me?’" He continued: "That basis is where we sort of build the relationship from. I think he trusts Todd and he sees that it is more than that. He gets to give it a go - and Todd is very patient, loving and kind." Cartwright also discussed the "prevalence" of conversion therapy: "I was very surprised by how prevalent it was," said Cartwright. "In my mind, it seems [like] such an outdated thing. It feels bizarre - the idea that you can change fundamentally who you love and who you fancy. I think it always reminds me of that scene in A Clockwork Orange, you know, when he's got his eyes pinned back and he's being made to watch this movie about violence. It's sort of, conversion therapy feels a bit like that. It just feels archaic." Carwright continued to discuss Theo's upcoming storyline: "It's like anything in life - things can be explained to you, but understanding [and processing] them is a different thing. Because his parents were privy to the conversion therapy, it's a much bigger thing. If you start to unpack that as a thing, fully, you go, 'Okay, my mom and dad, the Church, all my friends who I grew up with [and] the family friends are complicit'. I think he knows it wasn't okay, but he also has to process it for himself - he wants to just be happy."

On 18 September 2025, Pierce who plays Todd announced that his relationship with Theo would be at the centre of a storyline that would explore the subject of domestic abuse. He told Digital Spy: "Coercive control and domestic abuse storylines have been played before in Corrie and in other soaps, but I think it's fairly unprecedented that we've had this level of focus on an abusive same sex relationship. The themes and dynamics within are universal. But we want to be sure that we're truthfully depicting the way that the abuse can be slightly different or unique within the same sex relationship as well." Pierce discussed the research the soap has put into the topic: "One of the big things that's been flagged is the way that it can be very difficult to convince the authorities that that is the dynamic that is actually happening. There are also the social pressures that might make two men feel that: 'You're a bloke, you should be able to sort it out yourself'. Those quite narrow and archaic views of masculinity still sometimes pop up around a relationship dynamic like this. That's obviously not to say that it's not equally difficult for women to convince the authorities that they're in an abusive relationship with a man. It can be very difficult to access support whether it's a heterosexual or a same sex relationship."

== Laila Bailey ==
Laila Bailey
- Coronation Street character
- Portrayed by: Araya (2025); Raiya Walton (2025)
- First appearance: Episode 11,531/2; 31 March 2025
- Last appearance: Episode 11,751/2; 19 December 2025
- Introduced by: Kate Brooks
In-universe information
- Father: Joel Deering
- Mother: Dee Dee Bailey
- Half-brothers: Frankie Bolton
- Half-sisters: Maeve Wilkinson
- Grandfathers: Gus Deering; Ed Bailey
- Grandmothers: Anthea Deering; Aggie Bailey
- Uncles: Michael Bailey; James Bailey
- First cousins: Glory Bailey
- Other relatives: Ronnie Bailey; Sarge Bailey

Laila Bailey, played by Raiya Walton, is the newborn daughter of Dee Dee Bailey (Channique Sterling-Brown) and Joel Deering (Calum Lill). She was born on 31 March 2025 by an emergency caesarean section after Dee Dee suffered from pre-eclampsia. After a traumatic labour, Dee Dee consulted many medical professionals who passed off her pain as normal, however she ended up suffering a haemorrhage, meaning doctors had to perform a hysterectomy in order to save her life. Initially, she agreed to allow her brother, James Bailey (Jason Callender) and his partner, Danny Tomlinson (Dylan Brady) to adopt Laila, but had second thoughts due to the fact she would no longer be able to carry a child again. Laila's birth was part of a storyline which focused on racial injustice in maternity care. Coronation Street worked with three organisations - Birthrights, Motivational Mums Club and Five X More to make sure the storyline was portrayed sensitively and accurately.

Sterling-Brown commented on the storyline: "I was nervous about it – it's a big story to tell, it's a complicated story to tell. For me, I've never given birth, so a big thing for me was honouring mothers and doing that well. Also honouring our NHS, they are understaffed, overstretched, and that's obviously a factor. But I think also telling this story that does directly affect the Black community was important as well, and it's been great to see people engage in conversations."

== Wes Fuller ==
Wes Fuller, played by Kevin Finn, is a nurse who made his first appearance on 2 April 2025. Finn's casting was announced on the same day when he excitedly posted on Instagram: "FINALLY I can share this. I'm on @coronationstreet." He continued: "I'll be on a few episodes over the week or two. Was a blast. Thank you to my agent @alexpriestleytalent for getting me the audition! Doing the accent and all." Finn's talent agent, Alex Priestley Talent revealed his character's name, but his connections with Weatherfield had not been announced. On 16 April 2025, Jasmine Allday from The Mirror described that Wes had played a "key role" in that evening's episode when he bumped into Dee Dee Bailey (Channique Sterling Brown), who is unaware that Wes is the brother of her midwife, Zoe Harker.

== Danielle Silverton ==
Danielle Silverton
- Coronation Street character
- Portrayed by: Natalie Anderson
- Duration: 2025–present
- First appearance: Episode 11,537/8; 7 April 2025
- Introduced by: Kate Brooks
In-universe information
- Husband: Theo Silverton (until 2025)
- Sons: Miles Silverton
- Daughters: Millie Silverton

Danielle Silverton, played by Natalie Anderson, made her first appearance on 7 April 2025. She is the wife of Theo Silverton (James Cartwright), however upon casting, this had not been revealed. Her casting was announced on 2 April 2025, with her character set to appear as a part of Todd Grimshaw's (Gareth Pierce) new storyline where he embarks on a relationship with Theo. Joe Anderton from Digital Spy suggested Danielle "has some previous link with Theo that will see the storyline take an unexpected twist." On 12 April 2025, it was revealed that Danielle and Theo have two teenage children named Miles (Lewis William Magee) and Millie (Kaitlyn Earley) who appear on 14 April 2025.

When asked whether she was excited about her upcoming role, Anderson said: "Yes, 1,000%, which is what really made me excited from the off. This character really hits the ground running and she's got so much going on internally. There's the secrets, the family unit, the presentational side of things, her upbringing. Getting to play all those layers in one woman is so incredible and why I'm absolutely loving playing her." Regarding the storyline, Anderson teased: "You don't know what you're going to get. Initially we must remember that Danielle is grieving, she's only just lost her mum so her emotions are all over. One minute she can be crying and the next minute she's shouting at somebody. I think if the secret was to come out I can't imagine she's going to take it very well. She's a woman dealing with a lot of very intense emotions right now."

On 22 July 2025, it was revealed that Danielle would embark on a relationship with conversion therapist, Noah Hedley (Richard Winsor). She revealed her character's intentions: "There's two things happening. One is trying to show Theo what he's missing with his family life, this is what he's throwing away. And there might be an element of her trying to fill the void, Danielle and Theo were married for 19 years, that's a huge amount of time. I've been with my husband 20 years and can't even imagine him not being around. It's a little bit of a rebound. While she cares for Noah but is not completely committing wholeheartedly, she is kind of drawing this out a little bit. If there's an opportunity to be around Theo, she will take it. On the one hand she wants to do the right thing by her kids, but the right thing for her would be for their dad to come home and she's not going to give up on that." Anderson also revealed what else will come: "As you can imagine it does get messier and more heated. We fall into two camps between Danielle and Theo, and the children will be caught in the middle of that. It is difficult, and representative of a lot of families going through messy divorces. That's been amazing to play and its not something I've done before, there's a lot of figuring out what's next and figuring out what's best for the children. When it starts to become a legal thing, how nasty does that get?". It's one thing trying to sort it out between yourselves, but when it gets to that next level things becomes more weaponised. There are some calculating things coming up, I'm not sure the audience will still be on Danielle's side after that!"

== Carl Webster ==
Carl Webster
- Coronation Street character
- Portrayed by: Jonathan Howard
- Duration: 2025–present
- First appearance: Episode 11,541/2; 11 April 2025
- Introduced by: Kate Brooks
- Crossover appearances: Corriedale (2026)
In-universe information
- Mother: Debbie Webster
- Adoptive father: Bill Webster
- Adoptive mother: Elaine Prior
- Stepfather: Ronnie Bailey
- Grandfathers: Bill Webster
- Grandmothers: Alison Webster
- Uncles: Kevin Webster
- First cousins: Rosie Webster; Sophie Webster; Jake Webster; Jack Webster

Carl Webster, played by Jonathan Howard, made his first appearance on 11 April 2025. The character's introduction was announced on 24 December 2024, though the casting had not been revealed at that point. Carl had previously been mentioned on the soap as the son of Bill Webster (Peter Armitage) and Elaine Prior (Judy Gridley), and the half-brother of Kevin Webster (Michael Le Vell) and Debbie Webster (Sue Devaney). Carl will arrive in the midst of several new storylines for the Webster family, including Kevin's testicular cancer diagnosis, Debbie finding out that she has dementia, and Kevin's wife Abi Webster's (Sally Carman-Duttine) mental health struggles. Coronation Street producer, Kate Brooks revealed that she was introducing Carl to "build up that Webster clan", as she considers the Webster family one of the "big clans" of the soap.

Howard's casting was announced on 9 March 2025 alongside two other characters. His first scenes will see him clash with sister-in-law, Abi over a parking space before either realise that she is his brother's wife. The official press release explained: "As sparks fly and temperatures rise between them, can Carl charm his way out of this one and will Kevin and Debbie be pleased to have their little brother hanging around, whatever his motives are?" Howard provided more of an insight into Carl's character: "He's maybe a little bit selfish, especially between his trousers sometimes!"

In 2026 it was revealed that Debbie Webster is his biological mother.

== Miles Silverton ==
Miles Silverton
- Coronation Street character
- Portrayed by: Lewis William Magee
- Duration: 2025–present
- First appearance: Episode 11,543/4; 14 April 2025
- Last appearance: Episode 11,842; 22 April 2026
- Introduced by: Kate Brooks
In-universe information
- Father: Theo Silverton
- Mother: Danielle Silverton
- Stepfather: Todd Grimshaw
- Sisters: Millie Silverton

Miles Silverton, portrayed by Lewis William Magee, is the teenage son of Theo Silverton (James Cartwright) and Danielle Silverton (Natalie Anderson). He first appears on 14 May 2025 when she appears in George Shuttleworth's (Tony Maudsley) funeral parlour to pay her respects to their recently deceased grandmother. His casting was announced on 8 April 2025 alongside Kaitlyn Early, who plays his on-screen sister, Millie Silverton. Theo had recently began a relationship with undertaker Todd Grimshaw (Gareth Pierce), who is unaware of his new lover's wife and children until they arrive at the funeral parlour. Miles reappears in July 2025 when his mother begins a relationship with church clerk and conversion therapist, Noah Hedley (Richard Winsor) and they go out for a meal to the bistro. Todd and Theo arrive to see them having a meal and Miles blamed Todd for the break-up of his family, which causes Theo to intervene and attack Miles, leaving him injured.

On 18 September 2025, it was announced that Miles and Millie would visit Theo. An insider told Digital Spy: "Millie and Miles have struggled to accept their dad's new relationship with Todd. Every time they seem to be warming to Theo again, they get reeled back in by Danielle and scheming Noah Hedley. When the teens are summoned to spend some time on the cobbles with Theo, they're determined not to make life easy for him. It's awkward for Todd to be at the centre of the chaos."

== Millie Silverton ==
Millie Silverton
- Coronation Street character
- Portrayed by: Kaitlyn Earley
- First appearance: Episode 11,543/4; 14 April 2025
- Last appearance: Episode 11,679/50; 26 September 2025
- Introduced by: Kate Brooks
In-universe information
- Father: Theo Silverton
- Mother: Danielle Silverton
- Stepfather: Todd Grimshaw
- Brothers: Miles Silverton

Millie Silverton, portrayed by Kaitlyn Earley, is the teenage daughter of Theo Silverton (James Cartwright) and Danielle Silverton (Natalie Anderson). She first appears on 14 May 2025 when she appears in George Shuttleworth's (Tony Maudsley) funeral parlour to pay her respects to their recently deceased grandmother. Her casting was announced on 8 April 2025 alongside Lewis Wiliam Magee, who plays her on-screen brother, Miles Silverton. Theo had recently began a relationship with undertaker Todd Grimshaw (Gareth Pierce), who is unaware of his new lover's wife and children until they arrive at the funeral parlour. After their affair is revealed, Millie returned and vandalised Todd's hearse.

On 7 June 2025, George Lewis from Digital Spy announced that there would be a "surprise pregnancy" storyline involving Millie. After Theo left Millie in Todd's care to see Danielle, she confides in him that she may be pregnant and requests he keeps it a secret. However, she ended up telling Theo. Lewis confirmed that fans have speculated that the pregnancy was faked by Millie to try and bring her family back together again. These speculations were proven right at the end of the episode airing 20 June 2025 when Millie ordered a fake pregnancy bump whilst on the phone to Miles. On 18 September 2025, it was announced that Miles and Millie would visit Theo. Millie is giving Theo the cold shoulder and insisting that she and Miles are only visiting as they are legally bound to. An insider told Digital Spy: "Millie and Miles have struggled to accept their dad's new relationship with Todd. Every time they seem to be warming to Theo again, they get reeled back in by Danielle and scheming Noah Hedley. When the teens are summoned to spend some time on the cobbles with Theo, they're determined not to make life easy for him. It's awkward for Todd to be at the centre of the chaos."

== Dom Norwood ==
Dom Norwood
- Coronation Street character
- Portrayed by: Dominic Rickhards
- First appearance: Episode 11,549/50; 21 April 2025
- Last appearance: Episode 11,557/8; 30 April 2025
- Introduced by: Kate Brooks

Dom Norwood, portrayed by Dominic Rickhards, made his first appearance on 21 April 2025. He goes on a date with Jenny Connor (Sally Ann Matthews). Rickhards' casting was announced on 17 April 2025 and his arrival would form part of Jenny's stepdaughter, Daisy Midgeley's (Charlotte Jordan) exit storyline. Dom arrives after being hired by Daisy and her mother, Christina Boyd (Amy Robbins) to con her out of money, which Jenny is unaware of. A twist has also been announced that Dom will also flirt with Christina behind Daisy's back and also worries that Daniel Osbourne (Rob Mallard) will figure out their plot against Jenny. This would be Rickhards' second role on Coronation Street after playing Michael Wall intermittently in 1998 and 2000. Molly Moss from Radio Times described: "Rickhards's new character Dom Norwood looks set to similarly cause trouble, as he goes on a date with Jenny next week and tells her about a business venture he's involved in and persuades her to invest."

== Joanie Michaelis ==
Joanie Michaelis
- Coronation Street character
- Portrayed by: Savanna Pennington
- Duration: 2025–present
- First appearance: Episode 11,575/6; 21 May 2025
- Introduced by: Kate Brooks
In-universe information
- Occupation: Student
- Father: Mick Michaelis
- Mother: Lou Michaelis
- Adoptive father: Tim Metcalfe (foster)
- Adoptive mother: Sally Metcalfe (foster)
- Sisters: Shanice Michaelis
- Half-brothers: Brody Michaelis

Joanie Michaelis, portrayed by Savanna Pennington, is the elder daughter of Mick (Joe Layton) and Lou Michaelis (Farrel Hegarty). She first appeared on 21 May 2025, alongside her younger sister Shanice (Molly Kilduff) when Lou tries to flee Weatherfield following a domestic altercation with Mick. Lou tried to escape to a Women's shelter with Joanie and Shanice after Mick lashed out at Lou after finding out Kit Green (Jacob Roberts) is her older half-brother, Brody Michaelis' (Ryan Mulvey) biological father. Divya Soni from Digital Spy confirmed: "Coronation Street will explore the traumatic result of Mick Michaelis's domestic abuse in an emotional scene with his children."

Mulvey, who plays Joanie's half-brother, previously revealed the Michaelis' family dynamic and explained how he is like a father figure to his two younger sisters: "It's so nice that I've got the aspect of Brody's younger sisters, who he absolutely adores and he'd do anything for them. He's so protective of them, just because of the missing parental figures in their life. Brody becomes their dad or their carer, in a way. It's really nice to play that softer side to Brody. It feels like a weight off his shoulders when he's around them, even though he's trying to look after them. He doesn't have to put on an act or impress anyone."

In August 2025, Lou was sentenced to four years imprisonment after her attack on Gary Windass (Mikey North). Joanie, along with Brody and Shanice were placed in the care of Sally (Sally Dynevor) and Tim Metcalfe (Joe Duttine). Coronation Street cast former Emmerdale actress Glenda McKay as psychologist Alison Hale who visits them along with a social worker. An insider told Digital Spy: "The news that Brody, Joanie, and Shanice can all stay together with support from Tim and Sally is a huge relief for Brody - he hated the thought of his little sisters being separated. Despite Brody's hardman act, he cares deeply for his family and only wants what's best for them. Just when it seems like all is well, though, the scream shocks everyone. This could destroy Brody if it affects the custody decision..."

== Shanice Michaelis ==
Shanice Michaelis
- Coronation Street character
- Portrayed by: Molly Kilduff
- Duration: 2025–present
- First appearance: Episode 11,575/6; 21 May 2025
- Introduced by: Kate Brooks
In-universe information
- Occupation: Student
- Father: Mick Michaelis
- Mother: Lou Michaelis
- Adoptive father: Tim Metcalfe (foster)
- Adoptive mother: Sally Metcalfe (foster)
- Sisters: Joanie Michaelis
- Half-brothers: Brody Michaelis

Shanice Michaelis, portrayed by Molly Kilduff, is the younger daughter of Mick (Joe Layton) and Lou Michaelis (Farrel Hegarty). She first appeared on 21 May 2025, alongside her older sister Joanie (Savanna Pennington) when Lou tries to flee Weatherfield following a domestic altercation with Mick. Lou tried to escape to a Women's shelter with Joanie and Shanice after Mick lashed out at Lou after finding out Kit Green (Jacob Roberts) is her older half-brother, Brody Michaelis' (Ryan Mulvey) biological father. Divya Soni from Digital Spy confirmed: "Coronation Street will explore the traumatic result of Mick Michaelis's domestic abuse in an emotional scene with his children."

Mulvey, who plays Shanice's half-brother, previously revealed the Michaelis' family dynamic and explained how he is like a father figure to his two younger sisters: "It's so nice that I've got the aspect of Brody's younger sisters, who he absolutely adores and he'd do anything for them. He's so protective of them, just because of the missing parental figures in their life. Brody becomes their dad or their carer, in a way. It's really nice to play that softer side to Brody. It feels like a weight off his shoulders when he's around them, even though he's trying to look after them. He doesn't have to put on an act or impress anyone."

In August 2025, Lou was sentenced to four years imprisonment after her attack on Gary Windass (Mikey North). Shanice, along with Brody and Joanie were placed in the care of Sally (Sally Dynevor) and Tim Metcalfe (Joe Duttine). Coronation Street cast former Emmerdale actress Glenda McKay as psychologist Alison Hale who visits them along with a social worker. An insider told Digital Spy: "The news that Brody, Joanie, and Shanice can all stay together with support from Tim and Sally is a huge relief for Brody - he hated the thought of his little sisters being separated. Despite Brody's hardman act, he cares deeply for his family and only wants what's best for them. Just when it seems like all is well, though, the scream shocks everyone. This could destroy Brody if it affects the custody decision..."

== Fiona Morley ==
Fiona Morley
- Coronation Street character
- Portrayed by: Sara Poyzer
- Duration: 2025–present
- First appearance: Episode 11,579/80; 26 May 2025
- Introduced by: Kate Brooks

Fiona Morley, portrayed by theatre actress Sara Poyzer, is an ex-girlfriend of Ronnie Bailey (Vinta Morgan). She made her first appearance on 26 May 2025. She arrives when she asks Debbie Webster (Sue Devaney) to help her sell stolen cars. After her refusal, she goes into business with her son, Carl Webster (Jonathan Howard), who uses his uncle Kevin Webster's (Michael Le Vell) garage to perform dodgy MOT tests. On 25 July 2025, Katie Wilson from The Mirror discussed Poyzer's character status: "Though viewers know that Carl is in serious money trouble, it's unclear if Fiona's character will be a long-running fixture." Poyzer is married to actor Richard Standing, who played regular character Danny Hargreaves on Coronation Street between 1999 and 2001.

On 1 June 2026, Rebecca Sayce from Digital Spy reported that Poyzer would be returning to the soap. She said: "Coronation Street is set to bring back dodgy car dealer Fiona Morley as part of Carl Webster's ongoing storyline. The character, played by Sara Poyzer, was last seen on our screens in September when she was embroiled in a stolen vehicle scheme with Carl."

== Noah Hedley ==
Noah Hedley
- Coronation Street character
- Portrayed by: Richard Winsor
- First appearance: Episode 11,583/4; 30 May 2025
- Last appearance: Episode 11,675/6; 22 September 2025
- Introduced by: Kate Brooks
In-universe information
- Occupation: Conversion therapist Church Clerk

Noah Hedley, portrayed by Richard Winsor, is a former member of Theo Silverton's (James Cartwright) conversion therapy group. Winsor's casting was announced on 20 May 2025 and first appeared on 30 May 2025 as a friend of Billy Mayhew (Daniel Brocklebank), whose ex-boyfriend Todd Grimshaw (Gareth Pierce) began an affair with Theo in March 2025. Stephanie Chase from Digital Spy described Noah's arrival to be part of "Theo's dark backstory is beginning to unravel." Theo is set to see Noah in the Rover's Return and it causes him to rush out of the pub. He later reveals to Todd that Noah was present at his conversion therapy.

On 22 July 2025, it was revealed that Noah would embark on a relationship with Theo's ex-wife, Danielle Silverton (Natalie Anderson) after Todd overhears her on the phone to him. Anderson spoke about the relationship: "Noah is so disappointed in Theo and his choice because he's so devoutly religious. Noah is angry and thinks if you don't want to take care of this amazing family, I will. He is stepping up to the plate, looking after Danielle and the children, keeping them in the faith, providing a happy, stable relationship. There's an element of duty from Noah. He's very cosy and getting his feet under the table. Its for him to keep the family unit together and make sure Danielle and the children are not questioning the faith as well. There's an agenda for Noah to protect this family unit from this awfulness that is happening to her, and be the hero."

On 18 September 2025, it was announced that Noah would be leaving Coronation Street the following week. An insider told Digital Spy: "Danielle's legal representative quizzes Theo about being violent. She accuses him of assaulting Miles, so Theo responds by explaining that their altercation was an accident. While this is going on, Noah makes nasty comments under his breath, which Todd picks up on. And Todd becomes so furious with Noah that he ends up being escorted out of the courtroom by security." George Lewis from Digital Spy described Noah to have "been a menace for months."

== Ollie Driscoll ==
Ollie Driscoll
- Coronation Street character
- Portrayed by: Raphael Akuwudike
- Duration: 2025–present
- First appearance: Episode 11,615/6; 11 July 2025
- Introduced by: Kate Brooks
In-universe information
- Father: Ben Driscoll
- Mother: Melanie Driscoll
- Brothers: Will Driscoll
- Grandfathers: Jim McDonald
- Grandmothers: Maggie Driscoll
- Uncles: Finlay Driscoll; Steve McDonald; Andy McDonald
- First cousins: Amy Barlow

Ollie Driscoll, portrayed by Raphael Akuwudike, is the son of Ben Driscoll (Aaron McCusker). He made his first appearance on 11 July 2025. Initially, he was introduced as a love interest for Dee Dee Bailey (Channique Sterling-Brown), however in October 2025, his identity was revealed. Upon his first appearance, he bumped into Dee Dee in the Rovers Return Inn where he insisted on buying her a drink. They exchanged numbers, but they didn't cross paths again until Adam Barlow (Sam Robertson) introduced him to her as his new client involved in a dangerous driving case. Channique explained: "The viewers will be very suspicious of Ollie. That's because they're protective over Dee Dee. And I'll say that not everything is at it seems, but not necessarily in a bad way! They're going to be really excited about whether that goes and who Ollie is, as they get to know him…" She continued: "She's got to meet a person that is worth that and able to meet her where she is – so whether that’ll be Ollie or not, we’ll have to see!"

In August 2025, Dee Dee and Ollie shared a passionate kiss. Due to being a client, Dee Dee is concerned that a potential romance would cause a conflict of interest when representing Ollie. A Coronation Street source told Digital Spy: "Just as Dee Dee thinks she's met a nice guy, things immediately get complicated. She can't help how she feels about Ollie – though is he worth risking her career for?" They continued: "Has Dee Dee left her morals at the office? That said, there's no harm in a little smooch, and she's entitled to have some fun after the year she's had, but is this a moment of madness, or are she and Ollie officially an item?"

== Aunty Rani ==
Aunty Rani
- Coronation Street character
- Portrayed by: Josephine Lloyd-Welcome
- First appearance: Episode 11,633/4; 1 August 2025
- Last appearance: Episode 11,635/6; 4 August 2025
- Introduced by: Kate Brooks
In-universe information
- Nephews: Dev Alahan
- Other relatives: Aadi Alahan; Asha Alahan

Aunty Rani, portrayed by Josephine Lloyd-Welcome, is the aunt of Dev Alahan (Jimmi Harkishin) who arrives in Weatherfield ahead of his wedding to Bernie Winter (Jane Hazlegrove). Lloyd-Welcome's casting was announced on 23 July 2025 and she made her first appearance on 1 August 2025. Bernie and Dev's son Aadi Alahan (Adam Hussain) made a plan to use Rani's generous cash donation she made towards the wedding to pay off the corner shop's debts. However, when Rani decides to keep an eye on the wedding planning and how the cash is spent by creating a speadsheet to tally up the costs, as well as attending, this causes worry for Aadi and Bernie.

A Coronation Street insider told Digital Spy: "Aunty Rani's arrival throws a major spanner in Aadi and Bernie's plan to pay off their debts. When they decided to secretly do the wedding on the cheap and use her money to save the business, they never imagined she'd actually come all the way from India." They continued: "Aunty Rani has high standards, and Dev is desperate to impress her. She's given him so much money for the wedding, so he immediately starts fussing over her. Under Aunty Rani's scathing eye, Bernie doesn't feel up to scratch, so she puts on a posh accent in the hope of impressing her."

== Alison Hale ==
Alison Hale, portrayed by Glenda McKay, is a psychologist who visits Sally (Sally Dynevor) and Tim Metcalfe (Joe Duttine) to see how Brody (Ryan Mulvey), Joanie (Savanna Pennington) and Shanice (Molly Kilduff) are getting on in their care. She appears on 22 August 2025 alongside a social worker named Dawn Prentice (Yazmin Kayani). Her casting was announced on 14 August 2025. Rebecca Sayce from Digital Spy announced: "Iconic Emmerdale star Glenda McKay is making her grand return to soapland in rival show Coronation Street." She continued: "It has been 26 years since she stepped away from acting following her dramatic Emmerdale exit, but she is set to hit our screens once more in Corrie." Joe Crutchley from Leicester Mercury revealed that fans were "stunned" and "left scratching their heads" after realising where they had seen McKay before.

== Sienna Milburn ==
Sienna Milburn
- Coronation Street character
- Portrayed by: Charlotte Tyree
- Duration: 2025–present
- First appearance: Episode 11,653/4; 25 August 2025
- Introduced by: Kate Brooks
In-universe information
- Occupation: Paramedic
- Mother: Sadie Milburn
- Brothers: Tristan Milburn

Sienna Milburn, portrayed by Charlotte Tyree, is a paramedic supervising Asha Alahan (Tanisha Gorey) to train her to become a full-time paramedic. She first appeared in a special episode which aired on 25 August 2025 that focused on the struggles Asha had to face on her job. After her debut, Tyree posted some behind-the-scenes photos on Instagram, including a photo of her and Gorey outside the Rovers Return Inn with the caption: "Shift on … Sienna’s in. Having a tremendous time on The Cobbles so far! Everyone at @coronationstreet has made it so welcoming and a truly wonderful experience for me. Being a Northern Lass and stepping on to the iconic street feels incredibly special.." She also described what it was like working with Gorey: "@tanisha.gorey has been so generous and such a delight to work alongside. Now I’m going to go Roy’s Rolls to finally get Asha that Brew… #Coronationstreet." Gorey responded: "The best partner evurrrrr." Vicky Myers, who plays DS Lisa Swain replied: "Absolutely chuffed to bits for you.." Sydney Martin, who plays Betsy Swain commented: "smashing it!!!" Actress Michelle Keegan, who previously played series regular Tina McIntyre on the programme reacted with: "Go on girl."

On 23 June 2026, it was revealed that there would be a potential romance for Asha and Sienna. When Asha is in the Bistro, Amy Barlow (Elle Mulvaney), Nina Lucas (Mollie Gallagher) and Summer Spellman (Harriet Bibby) try setting her up with Sienna when she gets stood up. A Coronation Street insider told Digital Spy: "The girls later try to set Asha up with her old colleague Sienna! Could this be the start of a big new romance?" Gorey recently teased her romance: "There's definitely something on the horizon, and it's really sweet. It's also a little bit sad, but we see Asha having to be supportive. I really hope the fans get behind the story and what's coming up!"

== Deena Becker ==
Deena Becker, portrayed by former Brookside actress Sarah White, is a mediator who appeared on 1 September 2025. She appears as part of the divorce proceedings between Theo (James Cartwright) and Danielle Silverton (Natalie Anderson). Her casting was announced on 10 July 2025 and White would only appear in one episode. After her guest appearance, Joe Crutchley from Manchester Evening News spoke about White's appearance: "It's safe to say that the mediator Deena sparked plenty of chatter as fans immediately recognised the actress playing her."

== Becky Swain ==
Becky Swain
- Coronation Street character
- Portrayed by: Amy Cudden
- Duration: 2025–2026
- First appearance: Episode 11,663/4; 5 September 2025
- Last appearance: Episode 11,773; 12 January 2026
- Introduced by: Kate Brooks
- Crossover appearances: Corriedale (2026)
In-universe information
- Other names: Rebecca Swain
- Occupation: Police Constable
- Wife: Lisa Swain (2007-2026)
- Daughters: Betsy Swain

Rebecca "Becky" Swain, portrayed by Amy Cudden, is the wife of DS Lisa Swain (Vicky Myers) and mother of Betsy Swain (Sydney Martin). She first appeared on 5 September 2025 where Roy Cropper (David Neilson) accidentally shuts a door on her. Her character was previously believed to be dead, until her identity was exposed on 8 September 2025, when she visits Lisa at No. 6 on Betsy's 18th Birthday. Divya Soni from Digital Spy described this twist to be "game-changing". Fans believed that Becky has been keeping tabs on Lisa and Betsy, which Cudden confirmed she "absolutely" has been doing so online: "Her life in Alicante is hollow without them. Nothing matters unless she gets her family back."

Cudden explained Becky's arrival: "Becky's wife Lisa is about to get engaged and married to another woman. It was dangerous for Becky to return before, but her primary objective is to be with her wife and daughter." She continued: "While there wasn't a direct threat to that central family unit, she kept her distance. Now that Carla is a clear threat and Lisa and Carla are deeply in love, Becky feels she must return to try and reclaim her family even if that puts her at risk." Lisa has recently become engaged to marry factory owner, Carla Connor (Alison King) and their coupling has been named Swarla. Cudden also addressed the potential backlash that she would receive from fans of Swarla: "It's unconscionable, and they should be angry. However, it's such a complicated relationship that other feelings will emerge as it unfolds. Things forged in fire only get stronger. Becky is a spanner in the works, but it doesn't necessarily mean the worst, though it will be very difficult. Ultimately, this makes for really good TV and a fun, emotional, challenging, but rewarding journey for everyone." She added: "We want to give viewers a really good show; if everything was always wrapped up neatly, it wouldn't be interesting. Come with us on this journey!"

Cudden's last appearance as Becky featured in the episode originally airing on 12 January 2026, when Becky was sentenced to 12 years in prison for her crimes.

== Trisha Marlow ==
Trisha Marlow
- Coronation Street character
- Portrayed by: Anita Booth
- Duration: 2025–2026
- First appearance: Episode 11,687; 6 October 2025
- Last appearance: Episode 11,856; 13 May 2026
- Introduced by: Kate Brooks
In-universe information
- Occupation: Supermarket employee

Trisha Marlow, portrayed by Anita Booth, is a lady from Tim Metcalfe's (Joe Duttine) past who made her first appearance on 6 October 2025. Booth had previously played Nadine in Coronation Street in 2012. Tricia and Tim cross paths on the day of his and Sally Metcalfe's (Sally Dynevor) wedding anniversary when she gets into Tim's taxi and he remembers that he lost his virginity to Trisha when he was fourteen. They then meet again later that day in the Rovers Return Inn when Tim is having a drink with Kevin Webster (Michael Le Vell), who he introduces herself to. Tim gets carried away talking to Trisha, much to Kevin's diapproval, and forgets about his anniversary date with Sally. However, it is later revealed that when Tim lost his virginity to her, she was nearly twenty, which causes Brian Packham (Peter Gunn) who becomes uncomfortable and accuses Trisha of grooming Tim. Jonathon Hughes from Digital Spy described Trisha's arrival to "rocks [Tim's] marriage to Sally – and ends up making him question a murky chapter of his past." Olivia Wheeler from Leicester Mercury suggested that the upcoming storyline would leave "fans on edge".

A source told Digital Spy: "When Trisha Pinkerton gets in Tim's taxi, he can't believe it. They haven't clapped eyes on each other in almost 40 years. At first, Tim enjoys reminiscing about his schoolboy conquest, until unsettling details emerge of the retro 'romance'. Turns out the memories might not be as happy as Tim thought…" They continued: "Sally introduces herself as Tim's wife, and demands to know who this stranger is. Annoyed that Tim ruined their anniversary to take a walk down memory lane with an ex, Sally storms off. Tim later reminisces about his adolescent fling to Brian. He reveals that he was 14 when he lost his virginity to Trisha, who was nearly 20 at the time. Brian is quietly shocked, and reckons that's some age gap. Trisha is disgusted – as is Tim when he hears what Brian is implying. Brian, however, is adamant Trisha broke the law and that Tim was a victim of grooming as a 14-year-old. Now it's Tim's turn to be aghast."

== Pete Lang ==
Pete Lang, portrayed by Andrew Hayden-Smith, is a business associate of Theo Silverton (James Cartwright) who is invited over to stay, much to the dismay of Theo's partner, Todd Grimshaw (Gareth Pierce). He first appeared on 13 October 2025. Hayden-Smith's casting was announced on 9 October 2025 and his character would be a guest role as part of the soap's domestic abuse storyline. Molly Moss from Radio Times described that Pete's appearance would be when "things look set to take another dark turn." Hayden-Smith announced his casting on Instagram by posting a photo of himself outside the Rovers Return Inn with the caption: "Off to Weatherfield… BRB. Catch me on the cobbles as Pete Lang soon!"

== Ben Driscoll ==
Ben Driscoll, portrayed by Aaron McCusker, is the husband of Eva Price (Catherine Tyldesley) who first appeared in October 2025 as the new owner of the Rovers Return Inn alongside Eva's return to the series. His casting was announced on 5 August 2025 after speculation and they are joined by his mother, Maggie (Pauline McLynn), his two sons Ollie (Raphael Akuwudike) and Will (Lucas Hodgson-Wale), and Eva's daughter, Susie Price (Aurora Bradshaw). George Lewis from Digital Spy described the Price/Driscoll family to arrive with a "bang" and a "suitcase full of secrets". It was also revealed that this would be the second time actors McCusker and McLynn worked opposite each other after appearing on Channel 4 comedy drama Shameless.

Executive producer Kate Brooks spoke about the new castings: "We are beyond thrilled that Eva is returning as the landlady of The Rovers, with her new blended family in tow. The Driscolls do not arrive quietly, so expect big drama, explosive secrets and raucous knees ups galore." She continued: "To have actors of Catherine, Aaron and Pauline's considerable calibre at the beating heart of this family is absolutely wonderful, and we can't wait for you to get to know and fall in love with them as much as we have already done. Strap yourselves in, it's going to be an exciting and eventful ride."

== Maggie Driscoll ==
Maggie Driscoll, portrayed by Pauline McLynn, is the mother of Ben Driscoll (Aaron McCusker). Her casting was announced on 5 August 2025 and she would arrive in Weatherfield in October 2025 alongside Ben, his two sons Ollie (Raphael Akuwudike) and Will (Lucas Hodgson-Wale), girlfriend Eva Price (Catherine Tyldesley), and her daughter, Susie Price (Aurora Bradshaw). Her character has been described as the "interfering" mother-in-law to Eva. George Lewis from Digital Spy described the Price/Driscoll family to arrive with a "bang" and a "suitcase full of secrets". It was also revealed that this would be the second time actors McCusker and McLynn worked opposite each other after appearing on Channel 4 comedy drama Shameless. In a conversation with Radio Times, McLynn warned viewers to "put on your seatbelt", as Maggie is "fierce, formidable" and "is never wrong".

Executive producer Kate Brooks spoke about the new castings: "We are beyond thrilled that Eva is returning as the landlady of the Rovers, with her new blended family in tow. The Driscolls do not arrive quietly, so expect big drama, explosive secrets and raucous knees ups galore." She continued: "To have actors of Catherine, Aaron and Pauline's considerable calibre at the beating heart of this family is absolutely wonderful, and we can't wait for you to get to know and fall in love with them as much as we have already done. Strap yourselves in, it's going to be an exciting and eventful ride." Tyldesley described her relationship with her mother-in-law: "The way the writers have structured things for our characters, it’s hilarious, it's constant jibes. But I think deep down, there’s a moment that we did not so long ago where Eva, in a roundabout way, says 'If I wasn’t with Ben and I’d just met Maggie, I think we’d be mates.' There’s a lot of similarities."

== Will Driscoll ==
Will Driscoll
- Coronation Street character
- Portrayed by: Lucas Hodgson-Wale
- Duration: 2025–present
- First appearance: Episode 11,713; 5 November 2025
- Introduced by: Kate Brooks
In-universe information
- Father: Ben Driscoll
- Mother: Melanie Driscoll
- Brothers: Ollie Driscoll
- Grandfathers: Jim McDonald
- Grandmothers: Maggie Driscoll
- Uncles: Finlay Driscoll; Steve McDonald
- First cousins: Amy Barlow

Will Driscoll, portrayed by Lucas Hodgson-Wale, is the son of Ben Driscoll (Aaron McCusker). He first appeared on 5 November 2025, a week after his family, consisting of his father Ben, brother Ollie (Raphael Akuwudike), grandmother Maggie (Pauline McLynn), Eva Price (Catherine Tyldesley), and her daughter Susie Price (Aurora Bradshaw) arrived in Weatherfield. Hodgson-Wale's casting was announced on 20 October 2025. Before he arrived, Will was on a school trip in Kingston-Upon-Hull, but did not return and was reported missing to the police.

When Will properly returned home, his former athletics coach Megan was in tow. Ben, Eva and Maggie wanted answers from Will after Megan said she found him using the showers in the athletics complex and sleeping in the changing rooms back in Hull. Will told them he wanted to stay with his friends in Hull, however Ben begins to believe that Will is hiding something after Eva discovers a love letter that Will dismisses as from ages ago. Ben's suspicions turn out to be true when Will secretly meets Megan in the Ginnel, where they hugged and discussed a plan so they could be together, suggesting that Will is being groomed by her.

== Megan Walsh ==
Megan Walsh
- Coronation Street character
- Portrayed by: Beth Nixon
- Duration: 2025–present
- First appearance: Episode 11,713/4; 5 November 2025
- Introduced by: Kate Brooks
In-universe information
- Occupation: Athletics coach
- Mother: Janine Walsh

Megan Walsh, portrayed by Beth Nixon, is an Athletics coach who is grooming Will Driscoll (Lucas Hodgson-Wale). She first appeared on 5 November 2025 when she brings Will home to the Rovers Return Inn where his family have moved to. Will's father Ben (Aaron McCusker) questioned his whereabouts and confronted him regards to why he asked Lily Platt (Grace Ashcroft-Gardner) to get his passport for him. Later on, Will sneaked out into the Ginnel where he and Megan hugged and planned to be together. Calli Kitson from Metro spoke about the storyline: "It is clear that Will believes he is in a relationship with his former coach, but in reality, she has groomed him."

Nixon spoke about her character: "Megan is very calculated. Everything she does is for a reason, but she’s very good at hiding that. She's very insecure, but again, she hides it. So she’s very confident and charismatic on the outside; she charms people, she makes people feel sorry for her, she makes people like her. She's worming her way into this family; she’s almost like a parasite. But as an actor, I obviously need to find that humanity in her and make her a rounded character. She's not a one-dimensional character. She's not just this evil person." She continued: "She has all these other things going on—all these life experiences she's had, which have led her up to this point. The audience doesn't know, the other characters don't know, but she knows. So, there are all these things I've decided in my preparation. She's very insecure. She's desperate to be loved; she's desperate to be adored. And her reasons for that will eventually be uncovered, and we'll dig deeper and find out more about her. But she's a flawed person."

Nixon later went on to confirm that the character who would catch Megan out would be Lauren Bolton (Cait Fitton), who becomes suspicious after she was groomed by Joel Deering (Calum Lill). Nixon explained: "We can see her slowly worm her way into the family and befriend Eva Price (Catherine Tyldesley) and Maggie Driscoll (Pauline McLynn) and really get the women on side with her. They think she's good for Will; they think she's a brilliant mentor. So no one is suspecting anything at the moment. But we will see Lauren become suspicious because Lauren has obviously experienced something very similar to what Will's going through. So she knows what to look for; she knows the signs and she spots them on the street. So Megan changes tack and decides to use Daniel Osbourne (Rob Mallard) as the cover-up. We get to sort of uncover how truly vile she can be. She will stop at nothing to come out on top and survive, basically."

== Alan Driscoll ==
Alan Driscoll
- Portrayed by: Aidan O'Callaghan
- Appears in: Episode 11,741; 8 December 2025
- Introduced by: Kate Brooks
In-universe information
- Wife: Maggie Driscoll
- Sons: Finlay Driscoll
- Adoptive sons: Ben Driscoll

Alan Driscoll, portrayed by Aidan O'Callaghan, is the father of Ben Driscoll (Aaron McCusker) and late husband of Maggie Driscoll (Pauline McLynn) who appeared in flashback scenes in episodes which aired on 8 December 2025. O'Callaghan's casting was announced on 24 October 2025 and was described by Michael Adams from Radio Times as an "intriguing newcomer". O'Callaghan posted about his casting on Instagram with a photo of him in front of the Rovers Return Inn with the caption: "Who dis?" The episode explored Maggie's 65th birthday set in the present day, whereas the flashback scenes explored the Driscoll family history from when Ben and his younger brother, Finlay (Coen Carter) were children. Maggie's 65th birthday was to tie in with the 65th anniversary of Coronation Street. In the flashback scenes, the family are seen to be celebrating Maggie's birthday. It is also shown that the relationship between Alan and Maggie are quite tense and they argue a lot. In the final flashback scene, it was shown that they had an argument on the stairs that revealed that Maggie had an affair. Maggie then pushed Alan down the stairs which killed him. This was witnessed by Finley.

Following the episode, O'Callaghan expressed his gratitude towards his role on Instagram with the caption: "A bit lost for words after tonight… Tonight genuinely felt like a childhood dream coming full circle. Happy 65th Birthday, Coronation Street." He continued: "I grew up watching this show, never imagining I'd one day be part of a storyline like this on such an iconic show. So grateful to the entire cast & crew for the warmth, generosity and graft." O'Callaghan also shared a collection of on-set photos with his co-stars and stunt double, as well as a snap of himself behind the bar of the Rovers. He concluded: "And to everyone who sent messages, shared, posted and reached out, truly, thank you. I felt every bit of the support and it meant more than you know."

== Other characters ==
Character	Episode date(s)	Portrayer	Details	Ref.
Nursery Nurse	20 January	Suzanne Collins	A nursery nurse who works in the nursery where Alfie Franklin (Carter and Oakley Razak Townsend) attends.	
Amanda Green	16 May	Joanna Hudson-Fox	The adoptive mother of Kit Green (Jacob Roberts) who appears in a flashback dated back to 2007. Kit's biological mother Bernie Winter (Jane Hazlegrove) attempts to get into contact to see a teenage Kit, however Amanda refuses to let her see him and tells Bernie that she is his mother. It has since been revealed by Bernie that Amanda had died years later.	
Sammi Jones	11 August	Liz Carney	A woman who goes on a date with George Shuttleworth (Tony Maudsley) to the Rovers Return Inn, however gets interrupted by his sister, Glenda (Jodie Prenger), who remembers Sammi from school.	
Eli Merton	18–20 August	Daniel Garcia	A client at the Underworld factory, who had a meeting with Sarah Platt (Tina O'Brien).	
Dawn Prentice	21 July-14 November	Yazmin Kayani	A social worker who visits Sally (Sally Dynevor) and Tim Metcalfe (Joe Duttine) to see how Brody (Ryan Mulvey), Joanie (Savanna Pennington) and Shanice (Molly Kilduff) are getting on in their care.	
Naomi Giles	22 August-30 October	Melissa Batchelor	A woman who racially abuses paramedic Asha Alahan (Tanisha Gorey) whilst she is on duty. Things escalate further when Asha's stepmother Bernie Winter (Jane Hazlegrove) publicly shames Naomi leading to a spiral of events.	
Owen	1 October	Dominic Vulliamy	An ex-boyfriend of Theo Silverton (James Cartwright) who he bumps into at a club.	
Finlay Driscoll	8 December	Coen Carter	The younger brother of Ben Driscoll (Aaron McCusker) who appears in flashback scenes where Ben's childhood is revealed. He witnesses his mother, Maggie (Pauline McLynn) push their father Alan (Aidan O'Callaghan) down the stairs to his death.	
