= Glenda Shuttleworth =

Fictional character from Coronation Street

- Coronation Street character
- Portrayed by: Jodie Prenger
- Duration: 2022–present
- First appearance: 5 August 2022
- Introduced by: Iain MacLeod
In-universe information
- Occupation: Cruise ship attendant Barmaid; Singer
- Father: Archie Shuttleworth
- Brothers: George Shuttleworth
- Aunts: Nellie

Glenda Shuttleworth is a fictional character from the British ITV soap opera Coronation Street, played by Jodie Prenger. The character and casting was announced in June 2022 and Prenger made her first appearance on 5 August of that year. Prenger did not have to audition for the role and it was created for her in mind, which she was grateful for. Prenger was very happy to join the soap as it had been a dream of hers for years and her family had links to the soap as Prenger's great-uncle used to deliver the groceries of former cast member Pat Phoenix. Glenda was introduced as the sister of established character George Shuttleworth (Tony Maudsley) and she begins working as a barmaid of the Rovers Return pub, which Prenger was grateful for as it allowed her to interact with most of the cast. Prenger's singing was incorporated into the character and Glenda's backstory included the character working cabaret singer on cruise ships. Prenger has described the character as fun, bubbly and loving people, but admitted that she fronts a lot and wanted Glenda's vulnerability and backstory to be explored more. Glenda also sets up and runs a performing arts club for children.

Sharon Marshall incorrectly said on This Morning that Jodie would be leaving the soap in 2023 but this was later clarified to be a mistake. In 2024, Glenda was involved in a storyline which saw her be victim of a robbery at the Rovers, which Prenger described as being one of the scariest things that she had filmed in her career. The incidence shakes Glenda up and she struggles with the aftermath. That same year, Glenda develops a feud with George over their inheritance, but they later make up, which Prenger was happy about. Glenda also has a short-lived romance with Michael Bailey (Ryan Russell). Prenger called Glenda a hopeless romantic and hoped that the character would find love. Glenda has been well-received by viewers and critics and her first appearance had viewers writing on social media that they wanted to character to stay long-term on the soap. For her role as Glenda, Prenger was nominated for awards at the 2023 Inside Soap Awards and the Radio Times Soap Awards.

== Casting and characterisation ==
On 20 June 2022, it was announced that Jodie Prenger had been cast as Glenda Shuttleworth, the sister of established character George Shuttleworth (Tony Maudsley). Prenger had begun filming that same week. Joining Coronation Street had been a lifelong dream for the actress and she and her family were fans of the soap. Prenger called joining the soap an "honour" and a "special moment" in her life as it had been on her bucket list to be in the soap since she was little; she added that she had "always" wanted it to happen but did not believe that it would. She added, "To be part of something my family and I have loved for so long. And what a character, oh I have to say, total dream part. I can't wait for you all to meet fun and sassy Glenda". Prenger revealed that she already loved Maudsley and called her first day on set "one of the most nerve-wracking experiences", but said that everyone was "so gloriously lovely, kind and welcoming" and added, "It was, and is, everything I expected, and more". Coronation Street producer "Glenda sails in fresh from the cruise ships with a whiff of the exotic, quickly making best friends and enemies in equal measure. The character is loads of fun and has echoes of classic Coronation Street females of old. Jodie is a fabulous talent and we are all very excited to have her aboard. She has felt very Corrie since the moment she stepped onto set and I think the viewers will love her". Prenger later revealed that it felt "very special" to be cast on the soap as she had received a lot of "knockbacks" and felt like she was not good enough for the acting industry. She called joining the soap the "chapter" she "always wanted to read". Prenger revealed that she went "all giddy" during her first scene with Barbara Knox, who plays Rita Tanner, and that she was lost when she was watching a scene between Stephanie Beacham and William Roache, who play Martha Fraser and Ken Barlow, respectively. Prenger believed that she had scared Roache as she bowed when she saw him. Prenger's first day on set was the same day that her colleague Robert Shaw Cameron filmed his first scene as Laurence Reeves and they both shared their excitement at being in the Rovers.

The role was created with Prenger in mind and thus she did not have to audition screentest for the role, which the actress was grateful for as she believed that she had done badly in auditions for roles that she really wanted in the past. The actress met with MacLeod "prior to everything going". Prenger explained, "There was always a bit of talk but we did a show in Manchester [..] and that's when the talks really started but then there was a phone call, a lot of tears, that there was this part of Glenda. It was just amazing". Prenger revealed that she found out that she had received the role when her agent called her she was shopping in Ikea, which led to her screaming and crying. Prenger believed that this scared some of the shoppers in the store and that a woman nearly dropped a cactus that she was carrying. Prenger added, "I wanted to tell the world but I knew I couldn't tell anyone and I think that was the hardest thing. But yeah, I think I scared a lot of people in Ikea that day". Talking about working in the soap, Prenger said, "You know, the one thing, and you do speak to people in the [set] building, they go, 'I've been here 20, 30, 40 years', but it does fly. But I've had fun, it's just everything I've always wanted it to be and I can't really ask for more". Prenger called it "beautiful" that her dream of joining the soap had come true. Prenger added, "I think when your family have loved something for so long, it genuinely is an honour to be part of a constitution and a family. That's genuinely what it has felt like coming in. It's just a big, operating, lovely family and it's very, very special to me [...] On my first day I remember driving up to the gates at ITV and it felt like I was at MGM Studios. It was amazing. I didn’t need a trip to Disney World. I was already here!" Prenger's great-uncle used to deliver the groceries of former cast member Pat Phoenix, who played Elsie Tanner, a character that Prenger's grandmother "worshipped". Prenger described Glenda as a "woman to be reckoned with" and believed that she reminded her of her mother. Prenger also described her character as being fun, "camp" and loving people. Prenger also said that she looks different from Glenda when she is at home.

Prenger credited the people at Coronation Street for making her feel at home and said that she felt like her first six months on the soap had gone by quickly. Prenger has said that she loves having scenes with Patti Clare and Peter Gunn, who portray Mary Taylor and Brian Packham, as they make her laugh a lot, with Prenger calling it "entertainment within the entertainment". In March 2023, TV personality and "soap expert" Sharon Marshall incorrectly said on This Morning that Prenger would be leaving the soap as Glenda. However, it was later confirmed that this was not the case and that Prenger would be staying as Glenda, with Marshall confirming on Twitter that she had made a mistake and called Glenda "fabulous". That same year, Prenger revealed that she still sometimes get nervous on the soap. Prenger also revealed that her partner looks after their pets when she is at work. Prenger revealed that she walked into a gay bar in Manchester where someone shouted "Glenda, hello darling!", which made Prenger believe that people now were calling her Glenda rather than Jodie. Prenger has said that she often forgets that people are watching the soap, commenting, "It sounds bizarre but even when somebody recognises me in public I think they're staring because I've got lipstick on my teeth again!"

== Development ==
=== Introduction and backstory ===
Prenger made her first appearance as Glenda on 5 August 2022. In the episode, Glenda arrives at the same time that George has taken too many painkillers for his toothache and has to be hauled back in the back of a funeral car, and Glenda ends up instantly taking charge of the funeral proceedings instead. Glenda immediately becomes popular with George's partner Todd Grimshaw (Gareth Pierce) and the rest of the team. George is also happy to see her and introduces Glenda to his girlfriend, Eileen Grimshaw (Sue Cleaver). It is later revealed that Glenda is trying to get away from someone that she has been having an affair with.

In the character's introduction, Glenda has just returned from performing as a cabaret singer on cruise ships and she begins working as a barmaid in the Rovers Return pub. Prenger drew from her own experiences of working as a cruise ship entertainer to portray Glenda. Prenger said of the character, "She's a bundle of energy. She comes off a cruise ship and there’s a vibrancy to her that is a dream to play". Prenger said that she would be friends with Glenda in real life and would like to go on a cruise with her. An ongoing theme for Glenda is that she often sings but whenever she asks to sing at weddings or other events, she is told no and is not given the opportunity to. Prenger was happy that the soap had incorporated her singing into the character.

Prenger has said that it would be interesting to explore Glenda's backstory and see the character let others in as she "fronts a lot". Prenger called Glenda a "dreamer" who lived out of a "suitcase", which the actress related to. Prenger added, "it is nice to have that kind of grounding but I think she always reminisces in a fantastical way about, 'Oh, do you remember when I was on the ships', and probably half of it never happened", although Prenger was sure that Glenda had actually met Shirley Bassey. Prenger believed that Glenda is "completely insecure", explaining, "You know, we're all the same, we just want to get into a onesie with a top knot and snuggle up next to somebody. There is a lot of front with Glenda and it's nice to see these little snippets of her sometimes letting her guard down and I think she finds that hard to do. She probably fronts for other people. It's that thing of you put a front up for other people, you know, don't let the buggers grind you down".

=== Working as a barmaid ===
Glenda begins working in the Rovers Return, the pub of Coronation Street, where she is often seen chatting to the characters of the soap. Prenger started crying during her first scene in the Rovers and called it "mesmerizing". Prenger enjoyed having Glenda work in the Rovers as it meant that she was able to have scenes with most of the cast. It also reminded her of her mother and grandmother as they had been landladies of hotels. She added that she noticed how they never let their faces drop even if they were tired or upset and that she drew much of Glenda from that experience as Prenger saw her as someone who "will always try to put a smile on". Prenger called the "talent" in the pub set "second to none", adding that she enjoyed doing her acting and then watching the other cast "shine doing their scene". The actress added that she was able to pull pints and "whip out" packets of crisps quickly, which she added came natural to her and that she had been in several bars in her life. Prenger compared Glenda to former Coronation Street landlady Bet Lynch (Julie Goodyear). Glenda also starts managing her own franchise a performing arts school held at the community centre, "Little Big Shotz". The actress was happy that Glenda running it as she believed that Glenda was managing it okay and the actress had experience working with many children due to experience in plays such as Oliver! In 2025, Glenda is promoted by new owner Carla Connor (Alison King) and she becomes manager of the Rovers, which makes her "absolutely delighted". A Coronation Street source explained that Carla sees Glenda's potential and that her "brash confidence and capable dependability" makes her "perfect for the role", though they teased that she may face some jealousy from other staff that have worked there for long.

=== Robbery and trauma ===
"Events at the Rovers like the speed dating night are so much fun to film, and the last one which ended with the break-in was what I love about Corrie – lots of comedy coupled with heartbreak. It was like two stories combined, buy one get one free! Corrie is incredibly warm but can also have you on the edge of your seat [...] Glenda always puts on a front, it was nice to let that mask slip a bit and show different sides to the character. With her past I often wonder why Glenda went off on the cruise ships for years, was it for the fame or was she driven away? Glenda once said about her mother she felt she was 'too much for her', so obviously something heartbreaking went on in the family. It would be great to explore."

— Prenger on her highlight of 2023

In early 2024, Prenger revealed that Glenda would be in danger in a future storyline. Prenger called the story "very dramatic" and admitted that she was scared to film it. In the storyline, Glenda steps in to host a speed dating night at the Rovers; however, when Glenda is alone trying to lock up after the event is over, she finds masked burglars taking money from the till in the bar. Glenda is unable to stop them and the burglars shout at her to get on the floor and a terrified Glenda is forced to oblige and watch as they steal the money. When they leave, a tearful and panicked Glenda calls the police and tells her boss Jenny Bradley (Sally Ann Matthews) on what happened; although Glenda insists that she is okay tries to put on a "brave face", Jenny can see how much she is struggling and advises her to take time off, and it becomes clear that the situation has taken a toll on Glenda. Glenda suffers a "horrifying flashback" and she lashes out when George tries to approach her and accidentally startles her. Glenda then remembers that one of the burglars had a tattoo that she recognises as belonging to a man named Connor, who she had been on a date with earlier that evening; Prenger believed that Glenda getting that man involved was "a very bad judgement". Glenda blames herself for the ordeal as she confesses to Jenny that she told him that she would be alone that evening, and although Jenny assures her that it is not her fault, Glenda continues to feel guilty and struggles to enter the bar alone.

It was reported that the incident would leave Glenda as a "shell of her former bubbly self". Discussing the storyline, Prenger revealed that Glenda is "utterly horrified" by the robbery, adding, "It's the worst feeling for anyone to see somebody invading your home, your private space and something that you are there really to protect and look after". Prenger praised the acting of the "brilliant" men who played the robbers were "scary and it was so atmospheric" and also praised the director, Jason Wingard, and the way that the scene was filmed for being "very dramatic". Prenger revealed, "I'm not kidding you, I genuinely was scared! There was glass everywhere, there were bats involved, it was so well put together and formulated, very well done". Prenger opined that the scene was one of the scariest things she had filmed in her career. Prenger also said that she found seeing the regular characters moving and dating each other at the speed-dating night "very funny". The actress disclosed that Glenda would struggle with anxiety and that this would affect her breathing, and that Jodie feels like she has left her team down, adding that it is something that has really affected Glenda even though it is "easy to push to the side". Prenger added:

"Glenda is saving face and she doesn't want to admit to that experience getting to her, which we all don't. It's something that I hope raises truths with a lot of people that have gone through experiences like that and go, 'Ah, we'll be fine, I'm fine, oh no, I'm completely fine'[...] I think it's a lot of front and face for that as well. Even when there's something when she does talk to her brother George, she goes, 'Oh no I'm fine'. I think deep down she wants to say, 'Oh please stay with me, I don't want to be on my own'. That's the very hard thing, but I think a lot of people do and have experienced the same thing with whatever situation they've been in – whether it's been an intruder, or another experience in life. So, it'll be nice and a very good story to play."

=== Romances ===
In 2023, Prenger noted how Glenda had not had a lot of luck with romance and opined that whilst she wanted Glenda to have a new love interest, she believed that Glenda should not have good luck with men the "first time around" in order to not change the "habit of a lifetime". The following year, Prenger told Digital Spy that she believed that Glenda wants to settle down and have someone love her. She explained, "I feel she fronts a lot and I feel the essence of it is that she just wants to be loved by someone and has never met anyone to love her, really. I think she laughs and jokes about it but again I find that a very...almost like a Northern trait. I've had family members who, even on the darkest day, tried to make a joke of it but deep down it rips them apart. I think that's what she does. She jokes about the fellas – 'Oh, as you know if I ever met anyone'. But she really wants to say, 'Oh, do you know, I'd love to meet somebody'. But I can't see it going right for Glenda". In March 2024, Prenger teased that Glenda would have happier times after the robbery and that she would find love with an "unexpected" male character, although she did not reveal who it was. Prenger joked, "I don't know who's more thrilled – Jodie or Glenda!" Prenger praised the fact that fans of Glenda would often ask her if Glenda would find romance, which she loved, commenting, "People genuinely care and it's like a big family".

Glenda's new love interest was revealed to be established character Michael Bailey (Ryan Russell), who is initially Glenda's friend. A writer from TV Times had previously speculated that Glenda's love interest would be Michael's father, Ed (Trevor Michael Georges). In the storyline, Glenda spends time with Michael and confides in him on how she felt that her father preferred George over her. Michael tells Glenda that she is funny, kind and smart, and he then pulls her in for a kiss. However, Michael disapproves of Glenda's constant bickering with George over their father's will, despite previously backing Glenda and warning George to not mistreat Glenda. Michael tries to get Glenda and George to reconcile but this does not work, and Glenda worries that he is starting to cool with her because of the ongoing animosity between her and her brother. Afraid to lose Michael and everyone else, she tells George that she will drop the legal case if he gives her his house. The relationship between Glenda and Michael ends after a month, leaving Glenda to "pick up the pieces". Prenger said that she enjoyed filming Glenda's kiss with Michael. Discussing the breakup, Prenger said, "I'm still not over it, but hey-ho, she had a little dalliance with a toy boy".

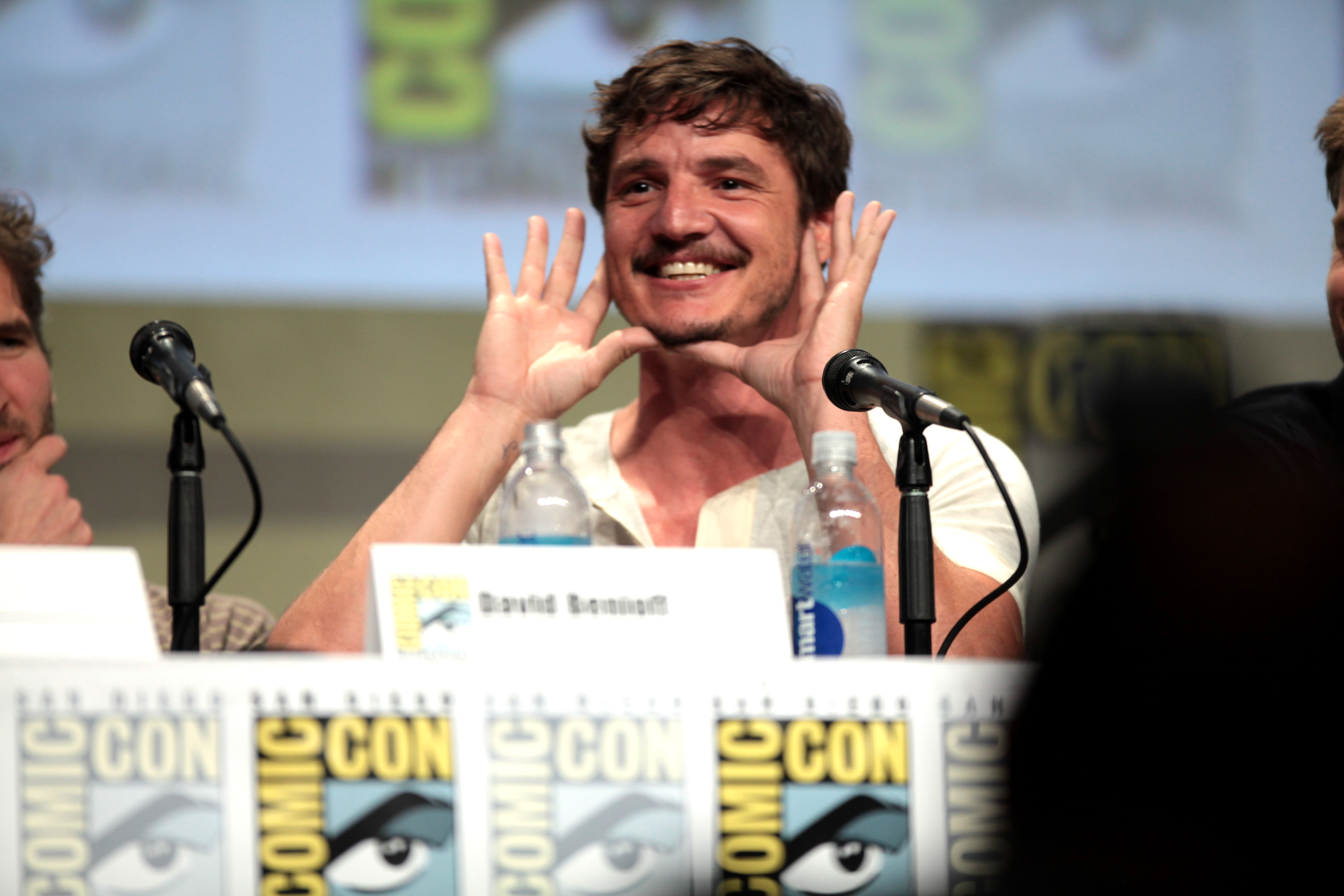
Prenger wanted to have Pedro Pascal cast as Glenda's love interest

Prenger revealed that some viewers wanted Glenda to get together with Steve McDonald (Simon Gregson), with one fan comparing them to former Coronation Street couple Vera (Liz Dawn) and Jack Duckworth (Bill Tarmey), with Prenger joking that she used to have a tight perm like Vera; Prenger also did not know what Steve's wife, Tracy Barlow (Kate Ford), would say about the romance. Prenger believed that Jack and Vera were the most comedic and "iconic double act" and said that she loved the characters as she grew up with them. Discussing Glenda's lack of love life, Prenger said, "I hope she finds love again [...] God love her, she's been on every dating site". Prenger joked that she would be happy to have Pedro Pascal cast as Glenda's love interest. Prenger later called Glenda a "hopeless romantic" and admitted "I've always been a bit of a Mills and Boon myself, so I'd like her to find love again. Although maybe just for a bit! If she got married, knowing Corrie they could have you going down a sinkhole on your wedding day. The dress would get filthy."

=== Family feud ===
A feud between Glenda and George aired in 2024. Prenger had previously said that she explore more storylines with Glenda's family. In the storyline, Glenda initially feels "snubbed" and storms out after George asks Eileen to register for power of attorney. Todd then finds another copy of the will of Glenda and Archie's father Archie Shuttleworth (Roy Hudd), which states that Glenda was supposed to have half of his funeral business back in 2018, which is not the case. George finds this out and worries that he has inadvertently cheated Glenda out of her inheritance. Maudsley explained that George then has a dilemma about whether to tell his sister, explaining, "George is half protecting his little sister, who he loves dearly. He's half protecting his dad's legacy, which he has diligently looked after and kept going since Archie's death. So he's in this quandary of not [wanting] to short-change his sister but also not wanting to hand her half a business that she's going to sink into the ground in five seconds, if she gets her hands on it!" Maudsley believed that George wants the "absolute best" for Glenda but is also aware that she is not "the sharpest tool in the box and if she gets her hands on money, she's going blow it on something and send both George and the company into an early grave". George tries to find out what Glenda would do with extra money and she says that she would spend it on her Little Big Shotz business. Maudsley believed that the discovery could drive a wedge between Glenda and George, saying, "As we all know, money does strange things to people, doesn't it? I think initially, she's just going to hold her hand out and wait for a big fat cheque!" The actor explained that George is thinking "very carefully" about his and Glenda's welfare if she got all the money she is owed, adding,

"I'm not sure Glenda is going to get what she wants straight away. There's going to be a bit of a battle there. And she's in a position where she's not got much money. She's renting a little room off Jenny over the pub. So life for Glenda, although she's happy, it's not great. It could be better. And if she sees these pound signs in her eyes, there may be no turning back! I think from George's point of view it was always odd that Glenda wasn't left much by their father. I think he understood why, because Glenda has always been into high kicking on the high seas and singing songs. She's Little Miss Showbiz, she always was, she was never a responsible kid. She couldn't even look after her pets properly. Pets died and she went and got another one or she'd wait for a new fad to kick in and say she wanted a terrapin. Things like that. So George knows that she's not a responsible person. He's just got to tread very carefully. And I'm sure George being George, he'll want the best outcome for everyone".

George then feels guilty when Glenda tells him that she wants to raise money to buy Little Big Shotz business; he offers to help Glenda apply for a bank loan but realises that she does not have a chance to be granted one when he looks at her accounts, and he stops her plan of paying in monthly instalments as he thinks she will not be able to pay it back. Todd later accidentally tells Glenda about the will, leaving her "feeling profoundly"; Glenda then asks lawyer Adam Barlow (Sam Robertson) about her legal options, who tells her that suing for half of the funeral parlour would be costly and risky, and Glenda is "Deflated" and "crushed" when Adam recommends that she forgets about the whole thing. George and Todd are then angry when they find out that Glenda has put the business up for sale without their knowledge. Prenger explained that Glenda is very hurt confused that her "beloved brother" would betray her like this and teased that there would be more arguments and misunderstandings, leading to a "family feud". Prenger also teased that viewers may see a feistier version of Glenda, telling Inside Soap, "I think that deep down, Glenda — as much as she likes to throw a game of bingo — has that fight in her that all northern women do," she said. "When push comes to shove, they're ready to rock and roll!" Prenger also revealed that future stories would show how Glenda is vulnerable but "hides under the backcombing or shoulder pads". Prenger hoped that Glenda and George would make up. The Shuttleworth siblings later decide to end their feud. Prenger and Maudsley both celebrated the end of the siblings' feud, with Maudsley writing on Instagram that the siblings "love each other really" and that "peace is restored". Prenger revealed that she found it hard to "to fight with somebody you love" and admitted that she and Maudsley would laugh after filming arguments as they had such a "great rapport".

== Storylines ==
Glenda comes to Weatherfield to reconnect with her brother, George Shuttleworth (Tony Maudsley). Glenda helps George's business partner Todd Grimshaw (Gareth Pierce) with a funeral due to George being unwell and resolves a disputer over burying the deceased with his prized trombone. Glenda moves into the lodgings and becomes fast friends with Sean Tully (Antony Cotton), Mary Taylor (Patti Clare) and Todd. Glenda lies about having experience as a barmaid to get a job at the Rovers Return. After she pours a bad pint, Jenny Connor (Sally Ann Matthews) agrees to keep her on after Gemma Winter (Dolly-Rose Campbell) offers to train her. Glenda wins over the customers with her stories from her time working on the cruise ships and she shows her worth when she throws a drunk customer out of the pub and successfully hosts the Rovers quiz night. Glenda takes Daisy Midgeley's (Charlotte Jordan) room at the pub when she moves out. Wanting to return to the entertainment world, Glenda asks to sing at Daisy's upcoming wedding but she is not convinced by her talent. Glenda's old friend Estelle Harrington (Ruthie Henshall) visits her and George lends Glenda money to buy the Weatherfield franchise of Little Big Shotz, a performing arts club for children. Glenda sets up the school at the community centre whilst keeping her job and the Rovers and she trains the children to put on a Summer Spectacular at the Viaduct Bistro.

When Jenny announces that the Rovers will have to close as it is no longer profitable, Glenda helps plan a party night designed to interest brewery "Newton & Ridley" in purchasing the pub. Glenda is meant to sing but when she loses her voice she books another singer. Philip Newton (Bruce McGregor) makes Glenda uncomfortable when he flirts with her and she calls him a perv to her a friend, unaware that the microphone is on and that everyone can hear through the speakers at the bar. Newton & Ridley do buy the pub but the company is purchased by LS Waterford, who fires all the staff, leading to Glenda moving in with George. Jenny later buys back the Rovers and Glenda moves back in and gets her job back. Glenda holds a speed-dating night but she is then assaulted by two men during a robbery when she is alone, leaving her shaken and blaming herself. Estelle later offers Glenda to buy Little Big Shotz off her and Glenda is desperate to get money to do so. Glenda then finds out that her father Archie Shuttleworth (Roy Hudd) actually left half of his funeral business to Glenda and a betrayed Glenda decides to sue George. Glenda starts dating Michael Bailey (Ryan Russell) but he grows tired of her feud with George and breaks up with her when she changes the locks of George's house. Glenda and George resolve their dispute when George offers Glenda the house if she leaves the business to him, which she accepts.

== Reception ==
For her role as Glenda, Prenger was longlisted for "Best Newcomer" at the 2023 Inside Soap Awards. The following year, she was nominated for "Best Comedy Performance" at the first Radio Times Soap Awards. She was also longlisted for "Best Comic Performance" at the 2025 Inside Soap Awards.

Speaking of the character's debut, Sam Cook from Wales Online opined that Glenda arrived at the "perfect time". Joe Julians from Digital Spy described Glenda's first appearance as "chaotic" and wrote, "Of all the times to show up...". Jasmine Allday from the Daily Mirror wrote how viewers "rejoiced" on Twitter when Prenger made her debut as Jodie and some wrote that they hoped the character would stay long-term in the soap. Katie Fitzpatrick from Manchester Evening News reported how viewers wrote on Twitter that they were already loving Glenda's character, with Fitzpatrick writing that Glenda "immediately looked right at home". Alice Penwill from Inside Soap called Glenda a "real force of nature" and noted how she had been waiting for George's family to appear on the soap for a "long time". Penwill's colleague Steven Murphy noted how Glenda quickly "won the hearts" of other characters and "legions" of Coronation Street viewers. Stephen Patterson from Metro wrote that Glenda wasted no time "finding her footing in the eponymous street" by getting a job in the Rovers Return.

In October 2022, Christopher Megrath from the Liverpool Echo reported how viewers were "divided" by Glenda's "drastic new look" after she changed her usual clothes style to host the pub quiz, with some viewers expressing on social media that they liked it whilst others did not. Michael Adams from Metro called Glenda "Bold and colourful" and noted how she "burst onto the cobbles". In 2023, Adam's colleague Calli Kitson wrote, "Let's not beat around the bush here, we love Glenda" and called her "absolute icon". Jessica Sansome from Manchester Evening News wrote that Glenda "found herself at home" at the Rovers. She also called Glenda "bubbly". Johnathon Hughes from Radio Times called Glenda "brassy" and "lovable" and believed that she could always "be relied on to raise a chuckle with her bang-on banter". In 2024, Laura-Jayne Tyler from Inside Soap wrote, "Jodie Prenger living her best life in Corrie is a special type of joy that could be bottled and sold for thousands. We'd buy". Alison Slade from TV Times wrote that the incident at the Rovers had left Glenda a "shadow of her former self". Maisie Spackman from Metro noted how "Poor" Glenda was "traumatised" and "left in pieces" by the violent robbery that she witnessed. George Lewis from Digital Spy called Glenda and Michael's relationship a "whirlwind romance" and opined that it was sad that they split up. Lewis' colleague Sam Warner believed that the end of Glenda and George's feud in 2024 was a "positive change". Louisa Riley from Inside Soap called Glenda "glamorous" and predicted that Glenda could introduce "Glitter in the hotpot" or "more campy cruise-ship karaoke" now that she has become manager of the Rovers.
