= List of Coronation Street characters introduced in 2022 =

Coronation Street is a British soap opera first broadcast on ITV on 9 December 1960. Following is a list of characters introduced in 2022, by order of first appearance. All characters were introduced by the programme's series producer, Iain MacLeod. Frank Bardsley (Simon O'Brien) joined in May as a love interest for Sean Tully (Antony Cotton). Jodie Prenger was cast as Glenda Shuttlworth, the sister of George (Tony Maudsley) and began appearing in August, followed by Dee Dee Bailey (Channique Sterling-Brown) who debuted in September. Cait Fitton made her debut in November as Lauren Bolton, as part of a racial violence storyline, and Ciarán Griffiths and Andrew Still made their first appearances as characters Damon Hay and Justin Rutherford in December. Several other characters appeared throughout the year.

== Ted Spear ==
Ted Spear
- Coronation Street character
- Portrayed by: Duggie Brown
- Appears in: Episode 10,526/7; 3 January 2022
- Introduced by: Iain MacLeod
In-universe information
- Grandsons: Jon Spear

Edward "Ted" James Spear, played by comedian Duggie Brown, is an elderly man that Faye Windass (Ellie Leach) accidentally hits with her car whilst she is learning to drive. Faye and Emma Brooker (Alexandra Mardell), whom she was driving with, check up on Ted and insist he goes to the hospital, but he claims he is fine. The pair later visit him and find out he has died. Emma later meets Ted's grandson, Jon Spear (Jordan Ford Silver) at Ted's funeral and the two end up dating. Jon tells Emma how close he was to his grandad, and how he hopes that whoever was responsible for his death does not get away with it, leaving Emma unnerved. Faye eventually tells Jon what happened and Jon is happy to hear that someone was there for his grandfather when he died. He and Emma later fall in love and leave for Australia to run a bar on Bancoora Beach together. Fans recognised Brown from many other roles, including two previous parts in Coronation Street in 1997 and 2004. Brown is also the real life brother of actress, Lynne Perrie who previously played series regular Ivy Tilsley in the soap.

== Teddy Thompkins ==
Teddy Thompkins
- Coronation Street character
- Portrayed by: Grant Burgin
- Duration: 2022–2023
- First appearance: Episode 10,546; 26 January 2022
- Last appearance: Episode 10,891; 2 March 2023
- Introduced by: Iain MacLeod
In-universe information
- Sons: Leo Thompkins

Teddy Thompkins, played by Grant Burgin, first appears when he bumps into his old school friend, Jenny Connor (Sally Ann Matthews), in the hospital waiting room. It is revealed that he is the father of Leo Thompkins (Joe Frost), whom Jenny is in a relationship with. Fans recognised Burgin from his many other soap roles, including as a site foreman in Coronation Street in 2017. Teddy's guest appearance on 26 January 2022 is extended when he returns a few months later to confront Jenny in the pub after finding out that she kissed Stephen Reid (Todd Boyce). Teddy tells Leo that she is bad news. Leo tells his dad to back off, but afterwards, Leo is murdered by Stephen, it is assumed that Leo took his father's advice and went to Canada alone. Later, Teddy discovers that text messages he received from Leo were not sent from Canada, but from Weatherfield. He becomes suspicious of Stephen's many questions and realises that Stephen is responsible for his son's disappearance. As he is on his way to tell Jenny, he is hit by a van and hospitalised, unable to remember anything. Teddy moves in with Jenny, leaving Stephen uncomfortable that his secret might be exposed.

Burgin departs the series on 23 January 2023, when Teddy eventually remembers what happened. He confronts Stephen, who hits Teddy over the head with a hole puncher, killing him. Stephen puts the body in a roof box and dumps it in a canal. Burgin made a final appearance on 2 March 2023 as a hallucination alongside Leo after Stephen drinks tea he laced with LSD to drug Carla Barlow (Alison King). Teddy's body is found by police officer, Craig Tinker (Colson Smith) in August 2023, after the roof box surfaces. The experience is described to be a "grisly body discovery" for Craig.

== Jon Spear ==
Jon Spear
- Coronation Street character
- Portrayed by: Jordan Ford Silver
- First appearance: Episode 10,548/9; 28 January 2022
- Last appearance: Episode 10,608/9; 8 April 2022
- Introduced by: Iain MacLeod
In-universe information
- Grandfathers: Ted Spear

Jon Spear, played by Jordan Ford Silver, makes his first appearance on 28 January 2022. Silver announced his casting earlier that day by posting on Instagram: "Thrilled to be joining the cast of Coronation Street - Catch my first ep on the cobbles tonight at 7:30pm." He is introduced as the grandson of Ted Spear (Duggie Brown), and is first seen talking with Emma Brooker (Alexandra Mardell) at Ted's funeral. Unbeknownst to Jon, Emma and Faye Windass (Ellie Leach) are partly responsible for Ted's death as Faye, who as a learner driver was driving her father's taxi under Emma's supervision, struck Ted with her car. Jon tells Emma how close he was to his grandad, and that he hopes the person responsible for his death does not get away with it, leaving Emma unnerved. Faye eventually tells Jon what happened and Jon is happy to hear that someone was there for his granddad when he died. He and Emma later fall in love and leave for Australia to run a bar on Bancoora Beach together.

== Dean Turnbull ==
Dean Turnbull
- Coronation Street character
- Portrayed by: Anthony Crank
- Duration: 2022–2024
- First appearance: Episode 10,576/7; 4 March 2022
- Last appearance: Episode 11,274/5; 24 May 2024
- Introduced by: Iain MacLeod (2022, 2023, 2024)
In-universe information
- Occupation: Drug Dealer

Dean Turnbull, played by Anthony Crank, is Abi Webster's (Sally Carman) drug dealer who first appears on the show on 4 March 2022. He has stolen a car from Websters Motors; Abi manages to get into the passenger seat while going into labour. Dean pulls over and once Abi leaves the car, he seizes this opportunity to speed off. Dean returns to the show on 21 August 2023 as part of Cassie Plummer's (Claire Sweeney) storyline, in which she is struggling to get her life back on track after years of addiction. He meets up with her to claim the money she owes him, and assaults her; Abi warns him off, and he departs again on 6 September 2023.

It was reported on 13 November 2023 that Crank had been seen filming scenes, and Dean returned on 9 January 2024 to supply Abi with morphine, which she buys for Paul Foreman (Peter Ash) who is suffering from motor neurone disease and wants to take his own life by overdosing before his condition worsens. On 13 May 2024, it was announced that Dean would return again. He first approaches Abi at the garage, asking her for help. She then discovers that sex videos that allegedly include her have appeared on the web; however, this is later proven untrue. "Assuming Dean is responsible, Abi confronts him with a wrench in hand. Dean insists he has no idea what she's talking about, but a furious Abi doesn't believe him. As Dean is taken in for questioning, Abi learns that four more videos have been uploaded, but as she studies the footage she realises they are deepfakes. The deepfakes turn out to be the responsibility of Stefan Brent (Paul Opacic).

== Alfie Franklin ==
Alfie Franklin
- Coronation Street character
- Portrayed by: Uncredited (2022); Carter and Oakley Razak Townsend (2022–present)
- Duration: 2022–present
- First appearance: Episode 10,580/1; 7 March 2022
- Introduced by: Iain MacLeod
In-universe information
- Father: Imran Habeeb
- Mother: Abi Webster
- Adoptive father: Kevin Webster
- Stepmother: Toyah Battersby
- Half-brothers: Seb Franklin; Charlie Franklin
- Half-sisters: Lexi Franklin
- Grandfathers: Hassan Habeeb
- Grandmothers: Saira Habeeb
- Aunts: Rana Habeeb

Alfie Franklin, portrayed by twins Carter and Oakley Razak Townsend, is the son of established characters Abi Webster (Sally Carman) and Imran Habeeb (Charlie De Melo), conceived during a one-night stand. When Abi's husband Kevin Webster (Michael Le Vell) learns of Abi's pregnancy, she lies and says that the father of her late son Seb Franklin (Harry Visinoni), Tez Wyatt (Stephen Lord), is the father. Kevin discovers the lie when he sees Alfie's birth certificate.

Alfie is born prematurely and Abi abandons him in the hospital when she panics about what will happen next. Imran hires paralegal Ben Chancellor (Jon-Paul Bell) to follow Abi and take photos that suggest she is using drugs again. As a result, Imran is awarded custody of Alfie and Abi is only allowed supervised visits. In June 2022, Imran dies in a car accident and Abi is awarded custody of Alfie; however, he at first resides with Wendy Crozier (Roberta Kerr), who is assessing Abi's ability to look after Alfie after her history of drug abuse and her abandonment of Alfie at birth. Alfie later lives with Abi, Kevin, and Kevin's son Jack Webster (Kyran Bowles) at 13 Coronation Street.

== Ben Chancellor ==
Ben Chancellor
- Coronation Street character
- Portrayed by: Jon-Paul Bell
- First appearance: Episode 10,616/7; 18 April 2022
- Last appearance: Episode 10,652; 30 May 2022
- Introduced by: Iain MacLeod
In-universe information
- Occupation: Paralegal

Ben Chancellor, played by Jon-Paul Bell, is a paralegal who appears between 18 April and 30 May 2022. He is hired by Imran Habeeb (Charlie De Melo) to spy on Abi Webster (Sally Carman) to find evidence of drug abuse so that Imran will be awarded custody of his son, Alfie. He lies in court when he sees Abi giving money to a friend, and claims that she had drugs in her hand. As a result, the court rules that Alfie will be safer living with Imran, with Abi allowed supervised visits. Chancellor's character has been described as a "dodgy paralegal." Leeds Live reported that Chancellor was part of a "dramatic storyline" who was introduced as part of Imran's exit storyline.

== Aaron Sandford ==
Aaron Sandford
- Coronation Street character
- Portrayed by: James Craven
- Duration: 2022–2023
- First appearance: Episode 10,620/1; 23 April 2022
- Last appearance: Episode 10,981/2; 16 June 2023
- Introduced by: Iain MacLeod
In-universe information
- Father: Eric Sandford

Aaron Sandford, played by James Craven is the ex-boyfriend of Summer Spellman (Harriet Bibby) who rapes Amy Barlow (Elle Mulvaney). He first appears as a member of a diabetic support group and bonds with Summer on her first visit. They begin to see each other outside of the group, but when Summer confides in Aaron about her bulimia, he informs her that he prefers to only see her in the support group, leaving her disheartened. They eventually begin a relationship.

Later, he contacts his ex-girlfriend, Mia Penrose (May Daley), and the pair stay up late into the night talking, which is overheard by his flatmate, Amy. Summer discovers that the pair were talking and is unhappy to learn that Aaron has discussed their personal problems with Mia. Aaron and Summer argue, during which he gets drunk and flirts with Amy. Amy is initially receptive to the sexual advances, but falls unconscious and whilst unable to further consent, Aaron rapes her. Aaron repeatedly denies the rape while Amy takes to social media, revealing his crime. Aaron's father sues her for libel. Eventually, the libel charges are dropped and Aaron departs from Weatherfield with his dad.

Speaking to Radio Times about Aaron's exit, Craven commented: "Yeah, I think I was always hoping that he would admit it or have some sort of admittance. I liked that there wasn't anything particularly overly dramatic about it, and I think unfortunately that is quite realistic because there are so many of these cases in real life where people don't face justice and people aren't prosecuted for it. So I think whilst that's obviously quite a hard thing to come to terms with for Amy, it is sadly quite realistic. I never wanted him to get away with it but I think it's one of those things that he's now got to live with it, knowing what he's done." He also explained how he felt about leaving the soap: "It's obviously very sad. It's been a lot of fun and I've really, really loved my time there. I met so many great people and I've made so many good friends for life. But I'm excited, I'm really, really excited to get on and go on and do other things."

== Frank Bardsley ==
Frank Bardsley
- Coronation Street character
- Portrayed by: Simon O'Brien
- First appearance: Episode 10,650; 27 May 2022
- Last appearance: Episode 10,696; 20 July 2022
- Introduced by: Iain MacLeod

Frank Bardsley, played by Simon O'Brien, makes his first appearance on 27 May 2022. O'Brien began filming for Coronation Street in March 2022, with his casting announced two months later. It was confirmed that O'Brien had been contracted as a guest star and would be appearing for a "couple of months". O'Brien, having appeared on the Channel 4 soap Brookside as Damon Grant in the 1980s, said that returning to a soap opera was difficult and a "learning curve" for him since the industry had changed so much. It was confirmed by Digital Spy's Daniel Kilkelly that Frank would be a love interest for established character Sean Tully (Antony Cotton) and that Frank has hidden depths. His backstory involves a childhood connection to George, "who knows details about his past and is wary of him". Kilkelly wondered if Frank would still be the same person George knew or if he had changed. This connection was later revealed as Frank having bullied George in school. Jenny Connor (Sally Ann Matthews) urged Sean to pursue his relationship with Frank, but Digital Spy's Susannah Alexander hinted that their relationship will not be "plain sailing".

Sean and Frank meet whilst Sean is working at the Rovers Return Inn and Frank begins flirting with him. Sean is initially reluctant to go on a date with Frank but eventually overcomes his insecurities and they begin a relationship. When it emerges that Frank bullied Sean's housemate, George Shuttleworth (Tony Maudsley) whilst they were at school together, Frank claims to be remorseful for his actions while George is unconvinced. Despite warnings from George, Sean continues to date Frank until he catches him bullying his son, Dylan Wilson (Liam McCheyne) and immediately breaks up with him.

O'Brien told Inside Soap that throughout his career, he has always wanted to "have a pint in the Rovers" since he felt it is an iconic landmark for the acting industry. Sarah Ellis of the magazine asked him if he was enjoying playing Frank, to which he said that he could not think of a better character to play. He explained that he loves playing light and comedic scenes, which he felt were the "basis of Corrie", but appreciated that below that, Frank is a flawed character, which he enjoyed from an acting perspective. He was also asked if he was worried about a negative reception from viewers. O'Brien admitted that he feared backlash from fans of both George and Sean and joked that he "may have to lay low for a while".

== Blake Myers ==
Blake Myers
- Coronation Street character
- Portrayed by: Adam Little
- Duration: 2022–2023
- First appearance: Episode 10,657; 6 June 2022
- Last appearance: Episode 10,864; 30 January 2023
- Introduced by: Iain MacLeod

Blake Myers, portrayed by Adam Little, was a boy who was initially bullied by Max Turner (Paddy Bever). He returns in January 2023 as part of the far-right storyline, after watching the extremist videos that Max has posted whilst he was being groomed by Griff Reynolds (Michael Condron) and his gang. Blake attends a meeting about the refugee drop-in centre held at Speed Daal and organised by Maria Connor (Samia Longchambon). He intends to stab Maria and livestreams an incendiary speech before the event. Max sees the stream and tries to warn everyone, but is stopped by Maria's husband, Gary Windass (Mikey North). As Blake charges for Maria, Alya Nazir (Sair Khan) stands in his way and is stabbed in the stomach. Alya is taken to hospital and makes a full recovery.

Blake departed the soap when he faced justice for the stabbing on 30 January 2023. Little confirmed the character's exit on 3 February 2023: "It's been a blast working with such a friendly cast and crew who have made me so welcome. Thank you to all the viewers who have supported and sent me lovely messages it's really appreciated!"

== Camilla Perrin ==
Camilla Perrin
- Coronation Street character
- Portrayed by: Louise Marwood
- First appearance: Episode 10,681/2; 4 July 2022
- Last appearance: Episode 10,683/4; 6 July 2022
- Introduced by: Iain MacLeod
In-universe information
- Husband: Phill Whittaker (backstory)

Camilla Perrin, played by Louise Marwood, the ex-wife of Phill Whittaker (Jamie Kenna) arrives in Weatherfield days before Phill's wedding with Fiz Stape (Jennie McAlpine) to tell Phill that she still loves him. When emails are revealed in which Phill tells Camilla that he still loves her, his mother Mimi Halliday (Margot Leicester) is immediately suspected of sending them as it is clear that she does not like Fiz. It was actually Fiz's daughter, Hope Stape (Isabella Flanagan) that sent them.

Marwood's casting was announced on 15 June 2022. She is famous for previously playing series regular, Chrissie White in Emmerdale. Executive producer, Iain MacLeod spoke about the Phill and Fiz romance storyline and how Camilla's arrival would affect things: "Fiz will end up in a huge dilemma about where her future lies. I think I know what Fiz's happy ending looks like, but it's going to be a long, brilliant, and complicated story for both of them. Once you've been hurt and humiliated like Fiz has, even if you find yourself wanting your ex back, is it that straightforward? Will pride, and your family, let you? I think it's going to be a cracking year for that household. As if it wasn't brilliant enough, you've also got Evelyn in the corner offering her acidic asides." On 28 June 2022, Digital Spy revealed photos of Marwood's appearance on the cobbles, before she made her first on-screen appearance.

== Glenda Shuttleworth ==
Glenda Shuttleworth, played by Jodie Prenger, made her first appearance on 5 August 2022. Prenger's casting was announced on 20 June 2022 and her character was confirmed to be the sister of established character George Shuttleworth (Tony Maudsley). Glenda is a former cruise ship singer who becomes a barmaid in the Rovers Return Inn.

== Laurence Reeves ==
Laurence Reeves
- Coronation Street character
- Portrayed by: Robert Shaw Cameron
- Duration: 2022–2023
- First appearance: Episode 10,709/10; 5 August 2022
- Last appearance: Episode 10,874/5; 10 February 2023
- Introduced by: Iain MacLeod
In-universe information
- Occupation: Dentist

Laurence Reeves, played by Robert Shaw Cameron, was introduced as a love-interest for Sean Tully (Antony Cotton). They met after Laurence attended a funeral for a man named Mr Pugh. After the breakdown of his short-lived relationship with Frank Bardsley (Simon O'Brien), Sean and Laurence got together with the help of his son, Dylan Wilson (Liam McCheyne) and friends, George (Tony Maudsley) and Glenda Shuttleworth (Jodie Prenger). However, the relationship began to crumble after a couple of months when Sean started to believe that Laurence was hiding something, due to his lack of social media accounts, which led to the speculation between the characters that he was a murderer.

Tully, who had signed a new contract in November 2021, revealed that Sean had a "big 2022" ahead of him, explaining, "There are stories that we tried to do, but in the end we couldn't because of the COVID-19 pandemic. So now they will happen over the next year. I have a very big, dramatic storyline that I am hoping we can now pick up and do properly." Laurence left the soap on 10 February 2023, after his relationship with Sean broke down. Cameron revealed that he had previously played another role before Laurence: "I grew up in Leeds and Corrie is just part of life. About 10 years ago I played a copper in Coronation Street, and when I first arrived one of the first people I ran into was Sue Nicholls (Audrey Roberts). She immediately offered to make a cup of tea, then when I was leaving she asked how it all went. I love Sue, and I love Audrey!"

== Griff Reynolds ==
Griff Reynolds
- Coronation Street character
- Portrayed by: Michael Condron
- Duration: 2022–2024
- First appearance: Episode 10,717/8; 15 August 2022
- Last appearance: Episode 11,279; 30 May 2024
- Introduced by: Iain MacLeod (2022, 2024)
In-universe information
- Occupation: Builder

Griff Reynolds, played by Michael Condron, was a far-right extremist, who appears to be a friend of Spider Nugent (Martin Hancock), who is actually an undercover cop, but this is unbeknownst to Griff. He convinces Toyah Habeeb (Georgia Taylor) to come to their demo, and Peter Barlow (Chris Gascoyne) comes along to peaceful protests; however, Griff's behaviour does begin to cross the lines on a few occasions such as assaulting police officer Craig Tinker (Colson Smith) by throwing a bottle. Peter then attends a concert with Griff, of which the band sing racist lyrics, which reveals Griff to be a racist.

It is later revealed that he is part of a far-right gang, who begin to groom Max Turner (Paddy Bever) into becoming a part of his gang which leads him to turn against his family, friends and neighbours whilst also believing everything Griff is saying. Max ends up making racist videos and sharing them on social media, but things get worse when Griff and his mates plant a bomb in a van near the Weatherfield Winter Market. When Max finds this out, he warns everyone. Max is eventually charged with his crimes, as is Griff and he ends up in an STC, whereas Griff is imprisoned. Griff returns, however, to speak to Spider about who is behind the racist gang and whether he would reveal them or not. Months later, after being released from the STC, Max was prepared to get Griff taken down for his crimes.

On 13 May 2024, it was announced that Griff would be returning to Coronation Street. He is set to return to Weatherfield Prison where Roy Cropper (David Neilson) is after being accused of the murder of Lauren Bolton (Cait Fitton). Metro described that Roy is "completely oblivious to the man making his way back into the Weatherfield prison" and asked "now Griff is back, does this put Roy in even more trouble?" Griff returned on 24 May and after Reece Bolton (Scott Anson) had told him about Roy being accused of Lauren's murder, he decided to try and kill him in prison, making it look like a suicide. Luckily, he was stopped after Roy was released after Nathan Curtis (Christopher Harper) had been arrested for Lauren's murder.

In 2023, Laura-Jayne Tyler from Inside Soap criticised the character, writing, "Did we really need another scene of Griff spewing his racist bile? Yet more previous seconds of lives we won't get back".

== Eliza Woodrow ==
Eliza Woodrow
- Coronation Street character
- Portrayed by: Savannah Kunyo
- Duration: 2022–2024
- First appearance: Episode 10,725/6; 24 August 2022
- Last appearance: Episode 11,242/3; 17 April 2024
- Introduced by: Iain MacLeod
In-universe information
- Father: Dom Everett
- Mother: Bridget Woodrow
- Half-brothers: Ben Everett
- Grandfathers: Stu Carpenter
- Grandmothers: Lucy Woodrow

Eliza Woodrow, played by Savannah Kunyo, is the daughter of Bridget Woodrow (Beth Vyse), and granddaughter of Stu Carpenter (Bill Fellows) and Lucy Woodrow (Lynda Rooke). She made her first appearance on 24 August 2022, when her mother reconnects with her grandfather after he served a 27-year prison sentence for the murder of his lover Charlie Walter. Her storylines have included being placed in Stu's care after his murder conviction is clear and her mother, who was actually responsible, is arrested for the crime alongside her mother who helped her cover it up, her rivalry with Hope Dobbs (Isabella Flanagan), who becomes jealous of her friendship with Sam Blakeman (Jude Riordan), and building a relationship with her estranged father, Dom Everett (Darren Morfitt), who ends up fighting her grandfather for her custody. Fellows, who plays Stu commented on the storyline: "There are load of twists and turns. Obviously people are guessing what's gonna go on, but there is so many permutations. No one wins and there are loads of people who get affected by this, and none of it has a happy ending in the end. It's quite tricky."

In August 2023, Eliza's father, Dom came back into Eliza's life, which caused a custody battle between him and Stu after he called Bridget in prison, who said he wasn't a suitable father. Initially, Eliza ended up moving in with Dom, but in December 2023, Dom moved to Germany to be with his wife and son, Ben. He returned in March 2024 and asked Eliza if she wanted to join him in Germany with her half-brother. Eliza accepted Dom's offer and they departed on 15 March 2024. Fellows commented on the storyline: "Eliza gets upset over wanting to live with Dom and she basically disappears, so Stu wakes up the next morning and she's gone. Stu thinks Dom has come and taken her but it's not true, she's actually freely gone to Dom, it leads to a big confrontation between them and Dom is basically like, if you're not gonna give me that money I'll make sure you suffer."

== Fern Lindon ==
Fern Lindon
- Coronation Street character
- Portrayed by: Gabrielle Glaister
- First appearance: Episode 10,727/8; 26 August 2022
- Last appearance: Episode 10,797/8; 16 November 2022
- Introduced by: Iain MacLeod
In-universe information
- Other names: Bernie Winter

Fern Lindon, played by Gabrielle Glaister, is a woman who appeared between 26 August and 16 November 2022, who looked almost identical to Bernie Winter (Jane Hazlegrove). Glaister's casting was announced on 14 August 2022. Glaister had previously played regular character Debs Brownlow, the sister of Natalie Barnes (Denise Welch), between February and November 2000; however, it was announced that she would be playing a different character this time. This character was described to be a "doppelganger" for Bernie.

Hazlegrove, who plays Bernie had suggested the idea of a doppelganger to writer, Jonathan Harvey. Hazlegrove said: "I mentioned this idea to Jonathan a while ago. Gabby and I are constantly mistaken for each other with people saying they have seen one of us in something when it was the other one. We have often laughed about it together but then I started thinking it might be fun to have her in the show as Bernie's secret twin or a doppelganger. I was so chuffed when they told me that they had devised this storyline and that Gabby was on board." The idea for the doppelganger storyline began at the 2022 Soap Awards, when Hazlegrove was mistaken for Glaister. Hazlegrove continued: "The actor was mortified when I pointed out who I was but of course I don't mind being mistaken for Gabby, it is a huge compliment and secretly I was thinking 'that's brilliant, this storyline is going to work so well'." Glaister also commented on her casting: "A very good friend of mine texted me last week to say he caught a bit of Corrie and thought I was very good. I pointed out that I wasn't on screen yet! When they approached me with the storyline It seemed like fate! What they've written is so clever and I'm having a ball working with Jane."

Fern accuses Bernie of stealing her blazer while Bernie was out shopping for Joseph Brown's (William Flanagan) school uniform. Since the pair look similar to each other, Fern offers Bernie money to take her place in a speed awareness course. Bernie later applies for a cleaner job with a cleaning agency, but Fern advises her against it because she believes the company is dodgy, takes advantage of her similar appearance, and attends the job interview posing as Bernie, who the job is offered to, and then does a cleaning job at a jeweler. The next day, she makes sure that Bernie meets up with her alone so she has no alibis, and then when the jeweler manager goes on a lunch break, she ransacked the place. She later then framed Bernie, who was doubted by everyone, including her daughter Gemma Winter (Dolly-Rose Campbell) and her partner Chesney Brown (Sam Aston), all except her own partner Dev Alahan (Jimmi Harkishin). Eventually, she manages to prove her innocence when they set up a trap to stop Fern, who turns up in the trap with the jewelry, who was arrested by Craig Tinker (Colson Smith).

Upon Fern's departure, Glaister admitted that she was "struggling". She told TV Times: "I have no idea [what I'm going to do next]. I'm struggling with empty nest syndrome as my son's gone off to university, so somebody needs to give me a job. I love doing telly and I love soaps. I've done Family Affairs and Emmerdale, as well as Corrie and Brookside. But, I haven't done EastEnders yet – I'd definitely consider it. It sounds dull, but I just love working." Glaister admitted when she was originally approached to play Fern, she wasn't so keen as she had already played Debs Brownlow two decades earlier. She added: "But hey, I'm an actor, and actors play different roles. It was a bit of a gamble. I think it has really worked, and we've had a lovely time filming it."

== Gabrielle Reid ==
Gabrielle Reid
- Coronation Street character
- Portrayed by: Helene Maksoud
- Duration: 2022–2023
- First appearance: Episode 10,735/6; 5 September 2022
- Last appearance: Episode 11,043/4; 28 August 2023
- Introduced by: Iain MacLeod
In-universe information
- Husband: Stephen Reid (1999-2023)

Gabrielle Reid, played by Helene Maksoud, is the estranged wife of Stephen Reid (Todd Boyce), who first appears on 5 September 2022, nearly 24 years after she was first mentioned in February 1999. Maksoud's casting was announced earlier that day by the Metro. Gabrielle Reid was Maksoud's second role on Coronation Street as she played May Radfield in 2019, who was the wife of Duncan Radfield (Nicholas Gleaves), who was also a conman.

On 24 June 2022, Stephen returned to Weatherfield after a nearly 15-year absence. By this time, he and Gabrielle had separated; however, it was later revealed when Gabrielle first appeared that Stephen had embezzled €200,000 from her company to pay off his debts, which was the reason for Stephen's return to try and get the money from Audrey to pay Gabrielle back. Stephen then goes on to con people out of money and becomes a serial killer, claiming the lives of Leo Thompkins (Joe Frost) and his father Teddy Thompkins (Grant Burgin), as well as Rufus Donahue (Steve Meo).

== Dee Dee Bailey ==
Dee Dee Bailey
- Coronation Street character
- Portrayed by: Channique Sterling-Brown
- Duration: 2022–2025
- First appearance: Episode 10,755; 28 September 2022
- Last appearance: Episode 11,751; 19 December 2025
- Introduced by: Iain MacLeod
In-universe information
- Occupation: Lawyer
- Father: Ed Bailey
- Mother: Aggie Bailey
- Brothers: Michael Bailey; James Bailey
- Daughters: Laila Bailey
- Grandfathers: Sarge Bailey
- Uncles: Ronnie Bailey
- Nieces: Glory Bailey

Diana "Dee Dee" Bailey, played by Channique Sterling-Brown, made her first appearance on 28 September 2022. Sterling-Brown's casting details were announced on 4 September, while the character has been mentioned by her on-screen family since their introduction in 2019. The show's producer Iain MacLeod admitted to being a fan of the character before she "physically existed" just by hearing her description from the Bailey family. Dee Dee is a lawyer and MacLeod stated that viewers could expect "a certain amount of chaos. She has got an incredibly big heart. She is incredibly competent at her job, but you'd never guess that to meet her."

MacLeod said Dee Dee would be involved in a major storyline, but she would not be hiding a "dark secret" like most newly introduced characters. He explained "She's so exuberant and just seems so bulletproof and impervious to the travails of modern life that she dusts herself down and gets on with it. I didn't want to discover that she's got some terrible burden." He thought that it was a "refreshing" decision and allowed the character to be "incredibly joyous." He believed the audience would take to her.

On 2 October 2025, Sterling-Brown announced that she would leave the soap after three years to explore new opportunities. Her departure on the soap aired on 19 December 2025.

=== Development ===
On 24 March 2025, it was announced that Dee Dee would feature in a storyline focusing on racial injustice in maternity care. Dee Dee is due to go into labour on 31 March 2025 and despite being in serious pain, she is discharged. Not long afterwards, her waters break which means she ends up back in the maternity unit, but a series of delays lead to her undergoing an emergency delivery. Dee Dee will suffer a huge haemorrhage and has to undergo life-changing surgery, which leads to her wonder if these medical issues were avoidable, and whether the mistakes made were linked to her ethnicity.

Speaking of the upcoming storyline, Sterling-Brown explained: "We've worked with some brilliant organisations and charities who were really great at advising on this story. I got to speak to a woman who had a real lived experience of this, and her story is not dissimilar to what happens to Dee Dee. It was emotional to hear her story and just finding the truth in that as well. Many of the conversations have been really hard but really helpful to hear what some women went through. The story we're trying to tell is one of truth. I don't think there is any malice in any of Dee Dee's treatment. But it is a case of her being on an overstretched and understaffed ward. She's not being fully heard because of assumptions that are potentially being made. I also think she maybe is a little bit in denial, because I don't think she's probably quite ready to have the baby." Explaining her character's progress into a dangerous situation, Sterling-Brown said: "It just ends up in a bit of an amalgamation of her pain being dismissed, and suddenly finding herself in a severe situation and she is really scared. Basically, everything is all systems go in terms of getting the baby out as quickly and safely as possible. But it's really frightening how quickly that develops, and how, if someone had intervened a bit sooner and picked up on those symptoms a bit sooner, it might have meant that such drastic measures wouldn't have needed to be taken."

Coronation Street is working with three organisations on Dee Dee's story - Birthrights, Motivational Mums Club and Five X More. In 2021 to 2022, Birthrights did a year-long inquiry into racial injustice in maternity care to understand more about the experiences that sit behind the statistics. The study found that Black women are three times more likely to die in childbirth than white women. Birthrights has also discovered from women whose worries were dismissed, including one mother who almost died of sepsis after healthcare professionals dismissed her concerns and symptoms due to the colour of her skin. Janaki Mahadevan and Shanthi Gunesekera, the co-CEOs of Birthrights commented on the storyline: "It's extremely important that a show like Coronation Street is highlighting the experiences of Black women in maternity care. The data has long shown how Black women are more likely to suffer physical and psychological harm through pregnancy and birth. Our Race Inquiry documented some of the experiences behind these statistics including consistent failure to identify medical conditions due to skin colour, racial stereotyping and breaches of consent. This is a crisis that has gone on far too long, and we hope that by bringing this to the wider public attention we can increase the movement for change. We are pleased that Coronation Street is taking this issue to its audience and showing the personal impact of experiences which sadly affect far too many Black women and birthing people. We know that individuals, families and communities have been left with a lifetime of trauma as a result of experiences like Dee-Dee's."

Christina Brown, the founder, CEO and health equity expert of The Motivational Mums Club, commented: "As we move forward, it's crucial that we maintain momentum in addressing the disparities that Black mothers face during labour and after birth. Black mothers are almost three times more likely to die during pregnancy and childbirth. There are the Black mothers who sadly, unfortunately have died and lost their lives. But there are the mothers who almost did. The psychological trauma of going through that, the psychological trauma of their families going through that is something that needs more awareness and addressing, which has also played a factor into Black mums being 13 per cent more likely to develop a mental health difficulty during the perinatal period but also less likely to get access to help as well. There's some breakdown somewhere, and it's all of our responsibility to ensure we as a collective push for better care for all, making services equitable. Which is what I do at the Motivational Mums Club by providing training to healthcare professionals and providing safe spaces for Black mothers to reach out for help. Thank you to Coronation Street for working with The Motivational Mums Club on Dee-Dee's storyline."

Five X More founders Clotilde and Tinuke commended Coronation Street for shedding light on a critical issue affecting Black mothers: "We are truly pleased that Coronation Street is addressing such an important subject. Black women in the UK are three times more likely to die during pregnancy, childbirth, or the six weeks postpartum compared to their white counterparts (MBRRACE 2024). This stark disparity demands continuous urgent attention. Our Black Maternity Experiences Report has shown that the root of these inequalities lies in healthcare professionals' attitudes, knowledge, and assumptions. The challenges faced by Dee-Dee in Coronation Street reflect the real-life experiences of many Black women, making this storyline all the more significant."

=== Reception ===
At the 2023 British Soap Awards, for her portrayal of Dee Dee, Sterling-Brown won the Best Newcomer accolade.

== Eric Sandford ==
Eric Sandford
- Coronation Street character
- Portrayed by: Craig Cheetham
- Duration: 2022–2023, 2025
- First appearance: Episode 10,763; 5 October 2022
- Last appearance: Episode 11,481/2; 29 January 2025
- Introduced by: Iain MacLeod
In-universe information
- Sons: Aaron Sandford

Eric Sandford, played by Craig Cheetham, is the alcoholic father of Aaron Sandford (James Craven) who had abused him when he was drinking and revealed this to stop his girlfriend, Summer Spellman (Harriet Bibby) from reporting his mugging to the police. Aaron had stolen cannabis from Eric's wallet, and he went to the garage, where Aaron worked to threaten him. Summer subsequently finds out that she is pregnant with Aaron's baby, and they agree with a plan with a couple Billy Mayhew (Daniel Brocklebank) knew from church Mike Hargrave (Tom Lorcan) and Esther Hargrave (Vanessa Hehir) that they would sell them their baby to pay for Eric to go through rehabilitation. He later returns to find out that Aaron is being accused of raping Amy Barlow (Elle Mulvaney), but he denies the allegations. As the investigation had been dropped, Eric was determined to prove his son's innocence, despite everyone shunning him, and he and Aaron began tormenting Amy and even tried to sue her for libel. Eric decided drop the case and leave Weatherfield after Aaron confessed to Eric.

In January 2025, it was reported by Digital Spy that Cheetham would return for one episode. Harriet Mitchell reported that Eric's return would "spell trouble for Amy" and would leave her "reeling".

== Daryan Zahawi ==
Daryan Zahawi
- Coronation Street character
- Portrayed by: Twama Omer
- Duration: 2022–2023
- First appearance: Episode 10,765; 10 October 2022
- Last appearance: Episode 10,888; 27 February 2023
- Introduced by: Iain MacLeod
In-universe information
- Occupation: Waiter

Daryan Zahawi, played by Twama Omer, is a refugee who began working at Speed Daal and initially befriended Max Turner (Paddy Bever). They subsequently fell out after they were both enrolled at Weatherfield High school, but Max didn't get in after he had previously attended before being moved to a pupil referral unit. As a result, he felt that Daryan had stolen his place. Max was subsequently groomed by Griff Reynolds (Michael Condron) and joined his far-right extremist gang, who attacked Daryan outside Speed Daal on 14 November 2022. These scenes received 112 Ofcom complaints. In February 2023, Daryan receives news from a man named Mo that his brother is now located in Nottingham. Gary Windass (Mikey North) and Maria Connor (Samia Longchambon) provide him with money to travel to Nottingham.

== Esther Hargrave ==
Esther Hargrave
- Coronation Street character
- Portrayed by: Vanessa Hehir
- Duration: 2022–2023
- First appearance: Episode 10,767/8; 12 October 2022
- Last appearance: Episode 10,856/7; 20 January 2023
- Introduced by: Iain MacLeod
In-universe information
- Husband: Mike Hargrave
- Stepsons: Callum

Esther Hargrave, played by Vanessa Hehir, and her husband Mike (Tom Lorcan) are a couple that attend Billy Mayhew's (Daniel Brocklebank) church. They first appear on 12 October 2022, when they meet Summer Spellman (Harriet Bibby), who is pregnant with Aaron Sandford's (James Craven) baby. Hehir's casting was announced on 4 October 2022.

Summer initially planned to have a termination, but Vanessa reveals that her and Mike would like to adopt her child and pay her to go through with the pregnancy, much to Billy's disgust. He however accepted it was Summer's decision. However, Summer had a miscarriage, but didn't say anything after being paid £10,000. Summer and Aaron decided to use the money to pay for his father, Eric Sandford's (Craig Cheetham) rehab. After Mike and Esther discover this, they offer more money for Summer to be a surrogate for them. The events turn nasty when Paul Foreman (Peter Ash) takes matters into his own hands when he attacked Mike, leaving him unconscious. Todd Grimshaw (Gareth Pierce) tried to hold him back, but was unsuccessful. These scenes had Paparazzi photos taken.

Todd subsequently contacted Mike and Esther's old church and it was revealed that Mike had an affair with a woman named Ava and they have a son named Callum. Summer confronts Esther on these events, but she says that they both decided to put the events behind them. Mike also revealed that he wanted Callum to be a part of Mike and Esther's life together, but she doesn't know that Callum is his son. Summer threatened to tell Esther the truth if he didn't. As a result, Mike holds her captive. Summer, who is diabetic, passed out as her sugar levels were low and when Esther arrived home, she phoned an ambulance. Esther found out all of Mike's secrets and Summer made a statement to the police regarding what Mike did.

Hehir departed the soap on 20 January 2023, however her exit was announced the next day. Taking to Instagram, she posted: "And just like that the Corrie adventure is over. I've truly had the most fun working with the best people and have made friends for life. It was worth the 30 years of auditioning since I was 11 to end up working with these phenomenal peeps. What a crazy ride it's been. Love you guys, @harrietanneb @james.t.craven and @tomlorcan who is definitely in my top 5 of TV husbands." Co-stars Harriet Bibby and Jack James Ryan responded: "Absolutely LOVED every minute," and "You killed it! Short but sweet. Big love xxx." respectively.

== Mike Hargrave ==
Mike Hargrave
- Coronation Street character
- Portrayed by: Tom Lorcan
- Duration: 2022–2023
- First appearance: Episode 10,767/8; 12 October 2022
- Last appearance: Episode 10,854/5; 18 January 2023
- Introduced by: Iain MacLeod
In-universe information
- Wife: Esther Hargrave
- Sons: Callum

Mike Hargrave, played by Tom Lorcan, and his wife, Esther (Vanessa Hehir) are a couple that attend Billy Mayhew's (Daniel Brocklebank) church. They first appear on 12 October 2022, when they meet Summer Spellman (Harriet Bibby), who is pregnant with Aaron Sandford's (James Craven) baby. She initially planned to have a termination, but Vanessa reveals that her and Mike would like to adopt her child and pay her to go through with the pregnancy, much to Billy's disgust. He, however, accepted it was Summer's decision. However, Summer had a miscarriage, but didn't say anything after being paid £10,000. Summer and Aaron decided to use the money to pay for his father, Eric Sandford's (Craig Cheetham) rehab. After Mike and Esther discover this, they offer more money for Summer to be a surrogate for them.

The events turn nasty when Paul Foreman (Peter Ash) takes matters into his own hands when he attacked Mike, leaving him unconscious. Todd Grimshaw (Gareth Pierce) tried to hold him back, but was unsuccessful. These scenes had Paparazzi photos taken. Todd subsequently contacted Mike and Esther's old church and it was revealed that Mike had an affair with a woman named Ava and they have a son named Callum. Summer confronts Esther on these events, but she says that they both decided to put the events behind them. Mike also revealed that he wanted Callum to be a part of Mike and Esther's life together, but she doesn't know that Callum is his son. Summer threatened to tell Esther the truth if he didn't. As a result, Mike holds her captive. Summer, who is diabetic, passed out as her sugar levels were low and when Esther arrived home, she phoned an ambulance. Esther found out all of Mike's secrets and Summer made a statement to the police regarding what Mike did.

== Dave Fairchild ==
Dave Fairchild
- Coronation Street character
- Portrayed by: Luke Delaney
- Duration: 2022–2023
- First appearance: Episode 10,781/2; 28 October 2022
- Last appearance: Episode 10,844/5; 4 January 2023
- Introduced by: Iain MacLeod

Dave Fairchild, portrayed by Luke Delaney, is a member of Griff Reynolds (Michael Condron)'s far-right extremist gang, who groomed Max Turner (Paddy Bever) and Lauren Bolton (Cait Fitton). He first appeared on 28 October 2022 when he, along with Griff, Reece Bolton (Scott Anson) and Ollie Deacon (Carl Blakely) attended a concert accompanied by Peter Barlow (Chris Gascoyne) and Spider Nugent (Martin Hancock). Delaney announced his casting on Instagram: "Looks like the news is out... Delighted to finally reveal that I've joined the cast of Coronation Street. Get ready to meet 'DAVE FAIRCHILD'."

Executive producer Ian MacLeod spoke about the extremism storyline: "Overall, Max's story is one about the grooming of a vulnerable teenager at a point where he's feeling most alienated and disenfranchised. The story will encompass the 'traditional' recruitment techniques of extremists groups, and we'll see Max befriended in person by older, mentor-like figures that will give him a sense of loyalty and brotherhood." He continued: "Then, later in the story, we will explore a very 21st Century problem: teenagers self-radicalising through watching extreme content online. In the end, we wanted this to be a story about communication within families - what are the right and wrong ways to talk to younger family members who are gravitating towards extreme views? For the conclusion of the story, David's misjudged attempts to deal with Max will drive the narrative to a shocking and thought-provoking climax."

== Ollie Deacon ==
Ollie Deacon
- Coronation Street character
- Portrayed by: Carl Blakeley
- Duration: 2022–2023
- First appearance: Episode 10,781/2; 28 October 2022
- Last appearance: Episode 10,844/5; 4 January 2023
- Introduced by: Iain MacLeod

Ollie Deacon, played by Carl Blakeley, was a member of Griff Reynolds' (Michael Condron) far-right extremist gang, who groomed Max Turner (Paddy Bever) and Lauren Bolton (Cait Fitton). He first appeared on 28 October 2022, alongside Reece Bolton (Scott Anson) when he along with Griff, Reece and Dave Fairchild (Luke Delaney) attended a concert accompanied by Peter Barlow (Chris Gascoyne) and Spider Nugent (Martin Hancock); however, the band's lyrics were racist, which Peter took issue with, causing a fight between him and Dave and the latter making violent threats. Ollie was the youngest member of the gang, aside from Max and Lauren and was seemingly the most impressionable. Ollie was responsible for filming a violent attack on Daryan Zahawi (Twama Omer) outside of Speed Daal where he worked, and posting it on the internet. Ollie departed alongside most of Griff's gang on 4 January 2023.

Over a month after his last appearance, it was confirmed that Blakeley had departed the series on 20 February 2023. Blakeley commented on his casting on Coronation Street by saying, "Joining the Cobbles in August was a dream come true and I've had the most amazing experience on the show... You guys made every day fun, and I couldn't have asked for a better team to work with."

== Reece Bolton ==
Reece Bolton
- Coronation Street character
- Portrayed by: Scott Anson
- Duration: 2022–2025
- First appearance: Episode 10,781/2; 28 October 2022
- Last appearance: Episode 11551/52; 23 April 2025
- Introduced by: Iain MacLeod
In-universe information
- Father: Frankie Bolton
- Daughters: Lauren Bolton
- Grandsons: Frankie Bolton

Reece Bolton, played by Scott Anson, is the father of Lauren Bolton (Cait Fitton), and a part of Griff Reynolds' (Michael Condron) far-right extremist gang, who were grooming Max Turner (Paddy Bever) and his own daughter into making racist videos. Throughout November, the gang constantly protested against Maria Connor's (Samia Longchambon) idea to open a refugee centre. In January 2023, the gang attempted to bomb the community's winter market, but Max now realising what he'd been manipulated into, warned everyone and the gang got sent down. Lauren then departed Weatherfield to live in Devon with her mother.

It was also announced on 5 July 2023 that Reece would return to Coronation Street, and he returned on 14 July 2024 when he asks Lauren, who returned to Weatherfield a month prior, to go and visit him in prison. Max goes with her and he asks them both to make a false statement to try and get him released from prison, but they both decline his request. In 2024 it was confirmed that Reece would return in the disappearance of his daughter, Lauren Bolton (Cait Fitton) storyline. Max goes to visit him in prison to see if he knew where she would have gone or who might have taken her but he did not know. Max then tells him that Roy Cropper (David Neilson) was accused of her disappearance and then Reece sends two people to Roy's cafe and held him hostage.

On 29 January 2025, Digital Spy announced that Anson would be reprising the role of Reece for one episode. Anson confirmed his return by posting: "Bad boy Reece is back." Reece's return appearance aired on 23 April 2025. Prior to the episode airing, he confirmed this appearance would be his last by posting: "Catch my very last ep as Reece Bolton @coronationstreet."

== Lauren Bolton ==
Lauren Bolton
- Coronation Street character
- Portrayed by: Cait Fitton
- Duration: 2022–present
- First appearance: Episode 10,786; 2 November 2022
- Introduced by: Iain MacLeod
In-universe information
- Occupation: Barmaid
- Father: Reece Bolton
- Sons: Frankie Bolton
- Grandfathers: Frankie Bolton

Lauren Bolton, played by Cait Fitton, made her first appearance on 2 November 2022. Lauren is the daughter of Reece Bolton (Scott Anson), a member of a racist gang controlled by Griff Reynolds (Michael Condron). She hangs out with Max Turner (Paddy Bever) due to his involvement with the gang, eventually becoming boyfriend and girlfriend. However, once her father and the gang have been arrested, she and Max break up as she leaves Weatherfield for Devon to live with her mother.

In June 2023, Digital Spy announced that Lauren would be returning to the series, with Fitton reprising her role that same month. Lauren returns to Max after a fallout with her mother, but learns that Max is dating Sabrina Adetiba (Luana Santos). In February 2024, Lauren goes missing. After Sean Tully (Antony Cotton) finds blood in her flat, police officers Lisa Swain (Vicky Myers) and Craig Tinker (Colson Smith) open an investigation. Roy Cropper (David Neilson) is later arrested and charged with her murder. In May 2024, it was revealed that Lauren had been attacked by lawyer Joel Deering (Calum Lill), after Roy had been falsely accused.

== Damon Hay ==
Damon Hay
- Coronation Street character
- Portrayed by: Ciarán Griffiths
- Duration: 2022–2024
- First appearance: Episode 10,940/1; 16 December 2022
- Last appearance: Episode 11,397/8; 27 October 2024
- Introduced by: Iain MacLeod (2022); Verity MacLeod (2024)
In-universe information
- Half-brothers: Harvey Gaskell
- Sons: Jacob Hay

Damon Hay, played by Ciarán Griffiths, made his first appearance on 16 December 2022. Damon is the estranged father of Jacob Hay (Jack James Ryan) and half-brother of Harvey Gaskell (Will Mellor). Harvey gives a significant amount of money to a desperate Nick Tilsley (Ben Price) to help the bistro, but Nick was unaware it was owned by Damon. Now Damon believes he is a rightful owner, he begins to use the bistro for a drug trade and Damon blackmails Nick into giving his son Jacob a job at the bistro to make him the handler of the drugs; however, Jacob has to get rid of it due to a sniffer dog in the bistro, Damon, angry with Jacob forces him to leave the cobbles for good.

Damon then begins an affair with Nick's sister Sarah Barlow (Tina O'Brien). However, once Sarah's husband Adam Barlow (Sam Robertson) finds out, Adam, seeking revenge warns one of Damon's enemies Niall, by telling him that Damon is going to grass him up to the police, knowing full well that Niall will go after Damon, Adam warns Damon that people are after him. Damon, scared for his life leaves Weatherfield. Sarah later discovers that she is pregnant and there was a question that he maybe the father. When Sarah received the DNA test results, it turned out to be Damon's baby, but her uncle Stephen Reid (Todd Boyce) stepped in and falsified results to say that Adam was the father. This, however, did not convince Adam after he phoned the clinic and at the gender reveal party, Adam revealed in front of everybody that the baby was indeed Damon's.

On 30 October 2023, it was announced that Griffiths would reprise his role as Damon. Griffiths' return was announced the same day as three other characters, Linda Hancock (Jacqueline Leonard), Tommy Orpington (Matt Milburn) and his half-brother Harvey Gaskell (Will Mellor) and Damon returned in January 2024. Since then, he has had Adam kidnapped and held at gunpoint after he found out Sarah miscarried his baby and believes that Adam is at fault for it, but he backs down and later embarks on a relationship with Sarah, much to the dismay of her family and Adam who was wanting to work things out with Sarah. Adam then visits Damon's half-brother Harvey in prison to see if he can get rid of Damon. He agreed providing he helped him get released from jail, where he was sentenced to after murdering Natasha Blakeman (Rachel Leskovac).

On 24 September 2024, six months after his departure, it was announced that Damon would be returning to Coronation Street. He would first make some voicemail scenes due to air in an episode which will be broadcast on 30 September 2024. Rumours of Damon's return were revealed on 8 August 2024 when Griffiths was spotted filming on the Coronation Street sets in Manchester. This was very unexpected as Griffiths and his family live in Australia. It was announced that Damon was set to appear in jail-based scenes. Sarah is due to receive those voicemail messages, but is going to Turkey to see her daughter, Bethany Platt (Lucy Fallon) who has been rushed into intensive care with sepsis. As a result, she asks Adam to check her messages whilst she is away. As he listens in, he hears one from Damon.

== Justin Rutherford ==
Justin Rutherford
- Coronation Street character
- Portrayed by: Andrew Still
- Duration: 2022–2023
- First appearance: Episode 10,827; 21 December 2022
- Last appearance: Episode 11,087; 17 October 2023
- Introduced by: Iain MacLeod
In-universe information
- Sisters: Karen Rutherford

Justin Rutherford, played by Andrew Still, made his first appearance on 21 December 2022. After an initial cameo, Still began appearing more as Justin when Justin was involved in a storyline highlighting stalking. Justin exited in 2023 when he went to prison, but Still reprised the role that same year, with the cameo return airing on 17 October 2023, appearing as an hallucination.

Justin is a young Scottish man that Daisy Midgeley (Charlotte Jordan) meets briefly at Weatherfield General when going for a mammogram and ultrasound. He later develops a romantic obsession with her and wants her to be with him instead of her fiancé Daniel Osbourne (Rob Mallard). He stalks her and sends messages to her on social media and flowers. He also starts working as a delivery driver in order to see Daisy more and sends her texts, much to her annoyance. Having had enough of Justin harassing her, Daisy lures him to Victoria Gardens and berates him for his attitude towards her, which causes Justin to attack her. Local police officer Craig Tinker (Colson Smith) witnesses this and arrests Justin for assault. Justin is charged for assault but is later released on bail.

On the day of Daisy's wedding, Justin confronts her in The Rovers Return and throws a glass of acid at her, only for her friend Ryan Connor (Ryan Prescott) to jump between them and is hit in the face and upper body by the acid. Justin flees the pub, but later is seen by Daisy at the car park of Weatherfield General and confronts him for what he did. Justin tries to justify his actions, before Daisy alerts the police, who arrest him for GBH and breaching his bail. At his plea hearing, Justin pleaded not guilty for what had happened to Ryan. At his trial, Justin tried to convince the jury that it was Ryan who had tried to throw the acid at him, only to spill it on himself. However, he was found guilty and would be sentenced at a later date. As Justin left court, he told Daisy that he still loved her and that they would be together again. Justin was later sentenced to ten years in prison for the acid attack.

After being accidentally soaked with water by Gav Adetiba (Noah Olaoye), Ryan has an hallucination and sees Justin instead of Gav. Angry to see the man responsible for his injuries, Ryan lashes out and has to be restrained by Daisy and Max Turner (Paddy Bever) before coming to his senses and apologies to Gav.

Justin's acid attack won "Scene of the Year" and "Best Single Episode" at the 2023 British Soap Awards, whilst Justin's of stalking Daisy was shortlisted for "Best Storyline" that same year. Still was longlisted for "Best Villain" at the 2023 Inside Soap Awards, whilst the acid attack and stalking storyline were shortlisted for "Best Storyline" and the acid attack won "Best Showstopper". Araminta Parker from OK! noted that Coronation Street fans were happy about Justin being convicted of his crimes and that they were "full of praise for Andrew Still's thrilling portrayal of the villain", adding that the actor "soared to fame" quickly due to the "harrowing storyline".

== Other characters ==
Character	Episode date(s)	Actor	Circumstances
Rahul Paswan	21 January	Micky Satiar	A social worker who helps Chesney Brown (Sam Aston) and Gemma Winter (Dolly-Rose Campbell) get support for their child Joseph Brown (William Flanagan).
Faith	21 January	Liz Simmons	Two friends of Leo Thompkins (Joe Frost) who visit him and his girlfriend, Jenny Bradley (Sally Ann Matthews).
Myles	21 January	James Lewis	Two friends of Leo Thompkins (Joe Frost) who visit him and his girlfriend, Jenny Bradley (Sally Ann Matthews).
Maisie Wheatley	11–25 April	Lucia Aliu	The daughter of Nicky Wheatley (Kimberly Hart-Simpson).
Henry Thorne	29 April – 29 June	Dominic Mafham	The boss of Aggie Bailey (Lorna Laidlaw) who she overhears a phone call in which he admits to rushing Peter Barlow's (Chris Gascoyne) operation a year earlier to win a bet. When she hears him say that he will complete the next one even quicker, she reports him. He discovers it was Aggie who reported him, and vows revenge. When Aggie tells Peter about his rushed surgery, he is furious. He confronts Thorne at a posh hotel and after being provoked by Thorne, punches him. Peter is charged with assault.
Sonya	6–20 June	Isabelle Smith	A love interest for Max Turner (Paddy Bever).
Bridget Woodrow	25 July – 9 August 2023	Beth Vyse	The estranged daughter of Stu Carpenter (Bill Fellows), whom he has not seen since she was a teenager as he spent 27 years in prison for a murder he adamantly denies committing. Stu tries to visit her when friend Yasmeen Nazir (Shelley King) finds her address. She shuns him, which leads to her mother Lucy Woodrow (Lynda Rooke) turning up a few weeks later to warn him off. She later builds a relationship with Stu and admits to committing the murder that he was accused of and was arrested and sentenced to 15 years in prison after Alya Nazir (Sair Khan) gets Dee Dee Bailey (Channique Sterling-Brown) to reopen the case. She later returns when Stu telephones her in prison to tell her that Eliza Woodrow's (Savannah Kunyo) father, Dom Everett (Darren Morfitt), has made contact and wants to be a part of her life. Bridget is against this because she does not think he will be a great father due to him not being interested in Eliza since she was born.
Lucy Woodrow	5 August – 14 October	Lynda Rooke	The mother of Bridget Woodrow (Beth Vyse) and ex-wife of Stu Carpenter (Bill Fellows). She tells Yasmeen Nazir (Shelley King) that he murdered someone who he was having an affair with. Yasmeen believes Lucy, and she kicks Stu out of her house. However, her grandchildren Alya Nazir (Sair Khan) and Zeedan Nazir (Qasim Akhtar) set out to prove his innocence. Stu later turns up at Yasmeen's house and is arrested for harassment. After Stu begins to build a relationship with Bridget and her daughter Eliza Woodrow (Savannah Kunyo), Bridget confesses to the murder which the case was recently reopened by Alya alongside Dee Dee Bailey (Channique Sterling-Brown), causing her and Lucy to be arrested with Lucy being sent down for 20 years for covering up the murder.
