= 28th National Television Awards =

British awards ceremony in 2023

- Date: 5 September 2023
- Location: The O2 Arena, London
- Country: United Kingdom
- Presented by: Various
- Hosted by: Joel Dommett
- Most awards: EastEnders (3)
- Most nominations: Coronation Street (4)
- Website: www.nationaltvawards.com

Television/radio coverage
- Network: ITV1
- Runtime: 150 minutes

The 28th National Television Awards were held on 5 September 2023 at the O2 Arena, London. They were hosted by Joel Dommett. The longlist nominations were released on 23 May 2023 and the shortlist was announced on 15 August 2023.

== Performances ==
- Cian Ducrot - "Heaven"

== Awards ==
Category and presenter(s)	Winner	Shortlisted
"Authored Documentary"; Presented by Kate Garraway	Lewis Capaldi: How I'm Feeling Now (Netflix)	Deborah James: Bowelbabe in Her Own Words (BBC Two); Matt Willis: Fighting Addiction (BBC One); Rob Burrow: Living with MND (BBC Two)
"The Bruce Forsyth Entertainment Award"; Presented by Dannii Minogue	Gogglebox (Channel 4)	Ant & Dec's Saturday Night Takeaway (ITV1); I'm a Celebrity...Get Me Out of Here! (ITV1); The Masked Singer (ITV1)
"Comedy"; Presented by Siobhan McSweeney	Young Sheldon (E4/CBS)	Brassic (Sky Max); Ghosts (BBC One); Ted Lasso (Apple TV+)
"Daytime"; Presented by Roman Kemp and Jermaine Jenas	The Repair Shop (BBC One)	The Chase (ITV1); This Morning (ITV1); Loose Women (ITV1)
"Drama Performance"; Presented by Vicky McClure	Sarah Lancashire (Catherine Cawood, Happy Valley – BBC One)	India Amarteifio (Young Queen Charlotte, Queen Charlotte: A Bridgerton Story – Netflix); Brenda Blethyn (DCI Vera Stanhope, Vera – ITV1); James Norton (Tommy Lee Royce, Happy Valley – BBC One); Judy Parfitt (Sister Monica Joan, Call the Midwife – BBC One)
"Factual"; Presented by Davina McCall	Paul O'Grady: For the Love of Dogs (ITV1)	Clarkson's Farm (Prime Video); The Martin Lewis Money Show (ITV1); Sort Your Life Out (BBC One)
"New Drama"; Presented by Michelle Keegan	Wednesday (Netflix)	Beyond Paradise (BBC One); Blue Lights (BBC One); Queen Charlotte: A Bridgerton Story (Netflix)
"Quiz Game Show"; Presented by Jill Scott and Mo Gilligan	The 1% Club (ITV1)	The Chase Celebrity Special (ITV1); Michael McIntyre's The Wheel (BBC One); Richard Osman's House of Games (BBC Two)
"Reality Competition"; Presented by Will Best and AJ Odudu	The Traitors (BBC One)	Love Island (ITV2); Race Across the World (BBC One); SAS: Who Dares Wins (Channel 4)
"Returning Drama"; Presented by Sir Lenny Henry	Happy Valley (BBC One)	Call the Midwife (BBC One); Stranger Things (Netflix); Vera (ITV1)
"Rising Star"; Presented by Maya Jama and Leomie Anderson	Bobby Brazier (Freddie Slater, EastEnders - BBC One)	Benjamin Chivers (Isaac, The Devil's Hour – Prime Video); Lewis Cope (Nicky Miligan, Emmerdale – ITV1); Channique Sterling-Brown (Dee Dee Bailey, Coronation Street – ITV1)
"Serial Drama"; Presented by Tim Peake	EastEnders (BBC One)	Coronation Street (ITV1); Emmerdale (ITV1); Hollyoaks (Channel 4)
"Serial Drama Performance"; Presented by Michelle Collins	Danielle Harold (Lola Pearce-Brown, EastEnders – BBC One)	Dominic Brunt (Paddy Kirk, Emmerdale – ITV1); Charlotte Jordan (Daisy Midgeley, Coronation Street – ITV1); Maureen Lipman (Evelyn Plummer, Coronation Street – ITV1)
"Special Recognition"; Presented by Sir Ian McKellen	Sarah Lancashire	
"Talent Show"; Presented by Andrew Ridgeley	Strictly Come Dancing (BBC One)	Britain's Got Talent (ITV1); The Great British Bake Off (Channel 4); The Great British Sewing Bee (BBC One)
"TV Interview"; Presented by Clive Myrie	The Graham Norton Show (BBC One)	Louis Theroux Interviews... (BBC Two); Piers Morgan Uncensored (TalkTV); The Chris & Rosie Ramsey Show (BBC One)
"TV Presenter"; Presented by Sam Ryder	Ant & Dec (Ant & Dec's Saturday Night Takeaway, Britain's Got Talent and I'm a Celebrity...Get Me Out of Here! – ITV1)	Alison Hammond (This Morning – ITV1); Martin Lewis (The Martin Lewis Money Show – ITV1); Bradley Walsh (The Chase – ITV1); Claudia Winkleman (Strictly Come Dancing and The Traitors – BBC One)

== Programmes with multiple nominations ==
Programmes with multiple nominations
Nominations	Programme
4	Coronation Street
3	The Chase
3	EastEnders
3	Emmerdale
3	Happy Valley
2	Ant & Dec's Saturday Night Takeaway
2	Britain's Got Talent
2	Call the Midwife
2	I'm a Celebrity...Get Me Out of Here!
2	The Martin Lewis Money Show
2	Queen Charlotte: A Bridgerton Story
2	Strictly Come Dancing
2	This Morning
2	The Traitors
2	Vera

Networks with multiple nominations
Nominations	Network
25	ITV1
20	BBC One
5	Netflix
4	Channel 4
3	BBC Two
2	Prime Video

== Programmes with multiple wins ==
Programmes with multiple wins
Wins	Programme
3	EastEnders
2	Happy Valley

Networks with multiple wins
Wins	Network
9	BBC One
3	ITV
2	Netflix

== See also ==
- 2023 in British television
