= Vanessa Hehir =

English actress (born 1981)

- Born: Vanessa Clare Judith Hehir; 28 October 1981 (age 44); Manchester, England
- Occupation: Actress
- Years active: 2001–present
- Television: Coronation Street
- Spouse: Leon Ockenden (m. 2010)
- Children: 1

Vanessa Clare Judith Hehir (born 28 October 1981) is an English actress, known for portraying the roles of Rosie Cartwright in the ITV police procedural drama Heartbeat (2004–2007), Kirsten Lind on the BBC medical soap opera Doctors (2008–2009), Sue Spark in the BBC drama Waterloo Road (2013–2014) and Esther Hargrave on the ITV soap opera Coronation Street (2022–2023).

== Life and career ==
Vanessa Clare Judith Hehir was born on 28 October 1981 in Manchester, England. She made her acting debut in 2001, appearing in an episode of the ITV police procedural drama Heartbeat. After having minor roles in series including Holby City and Down to Earth, she returned to Heartbeat three years later when she was cast in the regular role of Rosie Cartwright. She departed the series in 2007, with her character being presumed dead after being kidnapped. In 2010, she married co-star Leon Ockenden. The pair share a daughter together. Between 2008 and 2009, Hehir portrayed the role of Kirsten Lind on the BBC medical soap opera Doctors. She subsequently went on to appear in the show on two further occasions as different characters in 2019 and 2023, respectively. Then between 2010 and 2011, she had a recurring role as Nurse Summers in the ITV soap opera Emmerdale.

In 2013, Hehir joined the cast of the BBC school drama Waterloo Road for its ninth series as science teacher Sue Spark. She departed the series during the tenth series, after her character decided to give up teaching following the end of a relationship with Hector Reid, who was portrayed by Hehir's husband, Ockenden. Upon leaving, Hehir portrayed roles in episodes of Unforgotten, Midsomer Murders, Liar, Hollyoaks and The Dumping Ground. She has also appeared in a number of short films, including Eliana (2015), Slaved (2016), Secret Santa (2019), The Beast (2020) and The Willows (2021). Hehir has also directed a number of short films, some of which she starred in. In October 2022, she joined the ITV soap opera Coronation Street as Esther Hargrave, a woman whom along with her husband, planned to adopt Summer Spellman's (Harriet Bibby) baby, prior to her suffering a miscarriage. She made her final appearance in January 2023 following the conclusion of the storyline. In 2024, Hehir appeared in an episode of Casualty.

Hehir is a supporter of the Heartbeat Vehicle Rally, which is held annually in Goathland and celebrates the show by bringing together cast members as well as the classic vehicles used in the series.

Hehir also works as a writer and director.

== Filmography ==
Year	Title	Role	Notes
2001	Heartbeat	Gail Smethurst	Episode: "Gin a Body, Meet a Body"
2001	Doctors	Carrie	Episode: "Only Skin Deep"
2002	Cupboard Love	Anges	Short film
2004	Holby City	Karen Claymore	Episode: "The Buck Stops Here"
2004	Down to Earth	Kate Foster	Episode: "Can't Buy You Love"
2004	Grease Monkeys	Nicola Jay	Main role
2004–2007	Heartbeat	Rosie Cartwright	Main role
2008–2009	Doctors	Kirsten Lind	Recurring role
2010	West Is West	Esther	Film
2010	Ti presento un amico	Beautician	Film
2010–2011	Emmerdale	Nurse Summers	Recurring role
2012	Hustle	Louise Holmes	Episode: "Picasso Finger Painting"
2013	Stella	Katie	1 episode
2013–2014	Waterloo Road	Sue Spark	Main role
2015	Supreme Tweeter	Gina's Assistant	Episode: "#TheRedScare"
2015	Unforgotten	Thea	1 episode
2015	Eliana	Wife	Short film
2016	Slaved	Sally	Short film
2017	Midsomer Murders	Belinda Tressel	Episode: "Red in Tooth & Claw"
2017	Liar	Coffee Shop Woman	Episode: "The White Rabbit"
2018	Hollyoaks	Mrs. Hartley	Guest role
2019	Secret Santa	Charlotte	Short film
2019	Doctors	Trisha Jennison	Episode: "Bad Hair Day"
2020	The Dumping Ground	Amanda	Episode: "The Replacement"
2020	The Beast	Charlotte	Short film
2021	The Willows	Dawn	Short film
2022	The Bulls	Vanessa	Short film
2022–2023	Coronation Street	Esther Hargrave	Recurring role
2023	Doctors	Brooke Hare	Episode: "Lost Time"
2024	Casualty	Aisling Hagerty	Episode: "Trauma"
