= Channique Sterling-Brown =

English actress (born 1997)

- Born: 18 April 1997 (age 29); Brighouse, Calderdale, England
- Education: University of Central Lancashire (BA)
- Occupation: Actress
- Years active: 2015–present
- Television: Coronation Street

Channique Sterling-Brown (born 18 April 1997) is an English actress. She began her career appearing in various stage productions including Hedda Gabler, Summerfolk and Clybourne Park. In 2022, she began portraying the role of Dee Dee Bailey on the ITV1 soap opera Coronation Street, for which she was awarded the British Soap Award for Best Newcomer at the 2023 British Soap Awards.

== Life and career ==
Sterling-Brown was born in Brighouse, Calderdale, but split growing up between there and Hertfordshire. She attended Lightcliffe Academy from 2008 to 2015. Sterling-Brown wanted to pursue a career in law as a teenager, but was advised by her drama teacher to pursue acting. She turned down a place at law school despite her mother wanting her to take law. She then obtained a BA in acting at the University of Central Lancashire (UCLan) from 2015 to 2018. When she started at UCLan, she began appearing in various stage productions, making her stage debut as the lead role in Hedda Gabler. In 2018, after leaving university, she moved to Manchester and began volunteering at her local Samaritans branch since a man she knew killed himself. She continues to volunteer at least once a week alongside her acting, as well as singing in a band at her local church.

Sterling-Brown auditioned for the role of Naomi Walters in the ITV1 soap opera Emmerdale, but lost out to Karene Peter. However, later that year, she was cast in the ITV1 soap opera Coronation Street as Dee Dee Bailey, the daughter of the established Bailey family. The role marked Sterling-Brown's first major television role, after previously doing advertisements for Samaritans and various other mental health campaigns. Six months into her tenure, she was nominated for the British Soap Award for Best Newcomer, which she went on to win. She has also been nominated within the Rising Star category at the 28th National Television Awards, as well as Best Newcomer at the 2023 Inside Soap Awards. She told the Tis Yourself podcast that she holds a Corrie record- "I did the most episodes in 2024 of any Corrie character in a year ever." After three years in the role, her exit was announced in October 2025, with her final scenes set to air in late 2025.

== Stage ==
Year	Title	Role	Venue	Ref.
2015	Hedda Gabler	Hedda Gabler	UCLan	
2016	Richard III	Lady Anne	UCLan	
2017	Tartuffe	Dorine	UCLan	
2017	Summerfolk	Dvoetchie		
2018	Clybourne Park	Francine/Lena		
2021	That's What She Said	Anj	Out the Attic	
2021	Girls Night Out	Various	Girl Gang Manchester	
2021	Air	Roon	The Edge Theatre	

== Filmography ==
Year	Title	Role	Notes	Ref.
2017	The Invite	Laura	Short film	
2019	U+I	Doctor	Short film	
2021	My Melancholy Jazz	Ada	Short film	
2022–2025	Coronation Street	Dee Dee Bailey	Regular role; 257 episodes	

== Awards and nominations ==
Year	Award	Category	Result	Ref.
2023	British Soap Awards	Best Newcomer	Won	
2023	National Television Awards	Rising Star	Nominated	
2023	Inside Soap Awards	Best Newcomer	Won	
