= Jenny Bradley =

Fictional character from Coronation Street

- Coronation Street character
- Portrayed by: Sally Ann Matthews
- Duration: 1986–1991, 1993, 2015–2025
- First appearance: Episode 4815; 6 January 1986
- Last appearance: Episode 11684; 1 October 2025
- Introduced by: John G. Temple (1986); Carolyn Reynolds (1993); Stuart Blackburn (2015, 2016)
In-universe information
- Other names: Melanie Davies
- Occupation: Papergirl; Barmaid; Cleaner; Machinist; Pub Landlady
- Father: Alan Bradley
- Mother: Pat Bradley
- Adoptive mother: Rita Tanner (foster)
- Husband: Greg Midgeley (2007–2014); Johnny Connor (2017–2021)
- Sons: Tom Midgeley
- Stepsons: Aidan Connor
- Stepdaughters: Daisy Midgeley; Carla Connor; Kate Connor
- Aunts: Doreen Warburton
- Other relatives: Richard Bradley

Jenny Bradley (also Connor) is a fictional character from the British ITV soap opera Coronation Street, played by Sally Ann Matthews. She made her first appearance on-screen on 6 January 1986. Originally fostered by Rita Tanner (Barbara Knox), she has been featured in storylines including her troubled relationship with her father and Rita's partner, Alan Bradley (Mark Eden), his death when he is killed in a tram accident after chasing Rita in Blackpool and a brief underage romance with married man Robert Weston (Philip Bretherton); their separation in 1991 led to Jenny leaving Weatherfield on 1 March 1991.

Jenny returned for a short stint on 17 September 1993 when she visited Rita for money, but Rita's rejection of her resulted in Jenny leaving again on 8 October 1993. She returned for four months from 18 February 2015 after meeting Kevin Webster (Michael Le Vell) through online dating, and they began a relationship. She is seen to develop an obsession with his young son Jack (Jaxon and Maddox Beswick), which culminated in Jenny abducting him, before being found in Hull, where she is arrested by police, leading to her departure on 15 June 2015. Two months later, it was announced that Matthews would be returning to the role as a permanent staff member and she began appearing from January 2016. Although upon her return she is portrayed as a tragic character, her role has become more comedic. She married Johnny Connor (Richard Hawley) in 2017 and later storylines revolved around their relationship. Jenny and Johnny later separated and she became the sole owner and landlady of the Rovers Return Inn. In 2025, it was reported that Matthews would be departing the soap again and her exit aired on 1 October of that year.

== Development ==
=== Departure and brief return ===
Matthews decided to leave the programme in late 1990 and made her last appearance on 1 March 1991, in which Jenny moved in with married dentist Robert Weston. Matthews chose to leave in order to prove herself as an actress: "I hadn't been to drama school, I am northern and I had been in a soap. People used to say 'she's just a soap actress' and I would think 'no, she's an actress'. I thought I would go and do lots of regional theatre to earn my stripes and gain respect as a result."

In 1993, Matthews accepted an offer to return as Jenny for ten episodes. Matthews hoped that by showcasing an older Jenny, she could change casting directors' perceptions of her. Matthews replied: "I was still getting offered rebellious teenage roles and I was 23. I thought I would go back so people could see I was older now and it worked." Jenny's departure scenes aired in October 1993. Matthews was subsequently asked to return, but declined due to fear of typecasting.

=== Reintroduction ===
Matthews' feelings towards returning to Coronation Street changed four years before the next invitation came. On 4 October 2014, it was reported that Matthews was in talks about returning to the show. It was then announced on 20 October 2014 that Jenny would be making a return to the show in February 2015. Matthews said: "It was only in 2010—when the 50th celebrations started and I was asked to do this and that—that I thought, 'I'm never going to get away from it, people still recognise me from it, I'm dead proud I was in it, I should embrace it. So, that is when I started to feel differently about it and when they rang and asked me this time I said yes." Speaking about Jenny and Rita being reunited, Matthews said: "Jenny doesn't see Rita initially. She meets Kevin first and so I didn't share scenes with Barbara (Knox) for a while. However, the scenes I have done with her have just been like picking up from where we left off. There is a lot of unfinished business with them—Rita isn't very happy.

When asked about the differences between the show now compared to her previous stint, Matthews replied: "There were immense differences which I am used to because that is how TV is. Comparing my time then and my time now, the main difference is that we don't rehearse anymore. In the old days, we would spend all of Monday afternoon, all of Tuesday and all of Wednesday rehearsing and then we would shoot Thursday and Friday. There were less regulars then and as a group of actors, you were together for two and a half days so even if you didn't share scenes with some people, you still knew everybody very well. Everyone knew each other much better than they do today—there are still some actors I haven't met yet this time round."

=== Relationship with Kevin Webster ===
Shortly after the announcement of her return, it was announced that Jenny would begin a relationship with Kevin Webster (Michael Le Vell). Bosses of the show revealed details of the storyline which would see Kevin making a connection with a mystery woman online. He decides to meet up with her and is shocked to come face-to-face with Jenny. Jenny had turned to the online dating site after a nasty divorce and was pleased to find Kevin's face among the profiles, revealing that she had a crush on him when they were younger. Kevin and Jenny then strike a relationship after a successful meeting. Speaking about Jenny's dynamic with Kevin, Matthews said: "She really likes him. She is single and is nervous about online dating. She sees him and he is somebody who is familiar. I think she probably always quite fancied him back in the day and she thinks 'why not?' She definitely is interested in Kevin but whether she is using him to get back in Weatherfield, time will tell. Whether it could be a fling that will develop, time will tell!". Speaking about the reaction to them as a couple, she went on to say: "People don't react very well to them at all. We just had some scripts in and there is a brilliant hour-long episode coming up with Sally. I love the way her character has developed into this incredible job and I love what she is doing because it's hilarious. That is going to get Jenny's back up. Sally will obviously be very defensive of Kevin and so will Sophie. People will have heard stories and that is the interesting thing. When Jenny comes back, she meets people that she has never met before and they are nice to her but then somebody will have a word in their ear and attitudes change."

=== Kidnapping Jack and exit ===
On 19 April 2015, it was reported by The Sun newspaper that an upcoming plot would see Jenny kidnap Kevin's young son Jack. The kidnapping would be the culmination of a storyline which would see Jenny become increasingly obsessed with Jack, as she spends time looking after him. Discussing Jenny's kidnapping of Jack, Matthews explained: "I've not played it as premeditated at all. I don't believe that Jenny has planned any of it. You've got to remember that when Jack's childminder was ill a few weeks ago, Jenny was very reluctant to look after Jack. You've got to remember that she really didn't want to get involved. As soon as she did, she tried to break it off with Kevin. Kevin assumed that she was breaking it off because she thought that Rita was uncomfortable with their relationship. It wasn't that—it was just that her past was starting to come into her head and she didn't know what to do with it. That's the beginning of where we're going to go with this storyline. Jenny did have a child who died in the past. We are now going to see the consequences of that with what Jenny is going to do. She's got a deluded idea that she has to run off with Jack in order to keep him safe, so she's going to be very conflicted. She's totally lost it." Matthews also admitted that she is nervous about how fans may react when they see Jenny's unstable behaviour escalate. She laughed: "Sometimes the public assume you are that person. It was bad enough when Jenny slapped Maria [played by Samia Longchambon], God knows what it's going to be like now! I'll have to start putting Jenny's dark wig on, But there is a genuine reason why Jenny is behaving the way she is. I'm not playing it that she's a 'nutter'. Because of that, when it all finally comes out, I think there could be some understanding." Producer Stuart Blackburn praised Matthews for exploring the difficult subject matter with sensitivity. He said: "I think why the story is working is the way Sally Ann is playing it. I've never considered that character a 'nutter'. She's a terribly damaged woman whose life stopped the day her child died. She's just been unable, however hard she tries, to move away from that."

The storyline led to the end of Jenny's guest stint and her exit aired on 15 June 2015. On 11 August 2015, it was announced that Jenny would be returning permanently on 27 January 2016.

=== Relationship with Johnny Connor ===
On 8 February 2016, Richard Hawley, who portrays the character of Johnny Connor, revealed in an interview on Good Morning Britain that Johnny would embark on a relationship with Jenny. Hawley admitted that he was surprised about the storyline as he thought Johnny would more likely begin a romance with Liz McDonald, portrayed by Beverley Callard. He went on to say "It's interesting what is going to happen between Johnny and Jenny. He is a sucker for vulnerability and she's getting a hard time at the factory from all the workers at the moment. He has a very vulnerable side too. So, in a way, I think they are both good for each other. They both want a fresh start and I think this will mark a new dawn for them."

In March 2016, it was announced that an upcoming storyline would see Jenny return to Blackpool along with Johnny for a holiday together - the last time she was there was when her father Alan Bradley (Mark Eden) was killed by an oncoming tram in 1989. Discussing how Jenny feels about her father's death after all these years, Matthews said: "It still haunts her because she's back on the street and people are talking about Blackpool and it just makes those feelings a bit stronger." In July 2018, it was reported that Jenny and Johnny would become the new owners of the Rovers Return Inn. Matthews said: "Jenny is pretty adaptable. She sulks for two minutes, then runs to the moon with the idea. As soon as Johnny persuades her about The Rovers, she goes for it big style and she starts to make all kinds of plans. She wants it to be a cut above everything else."

=== Departure ===
On 1 August 2025, Sally Ann Matthews announced in an Instagram post that she would be leaving the role: "I was supposed to stay for five months but ended up doing an extra ten years because I loved it so much!" Jenny departed on 1 October 2025.

== Storylines ==
=== 1986–1993 ===
Jenny is fostered by Rita Fairclough (Barbara Knox), following the death of her mother, Pat, in a road accident. Her father, Alan Bradley (Mark Eden), is traced after being absent for six years and re-enters her life. Although she initially feels bitter towards him, they soon bond as he settles into No. 7 with Rita.

Aged seventeen, Jenny runs off to France with Martin Platt (Sean Wilson) and meets a medical student—Patrice Podevin (Franck Dubosc), whom she ends up falling in love with. Patrice soon follows her back to the UK and they get engaged, though Patrice promises Alan that he will wait until he has finished his studies before they get married. However, after he discovers that Jenny has kissed another man, Gary Grimshaw (Colin Kerrigan), at a party, Patrice calls off the engagement and returns to France. In 1989, on the eve of her eighteenth birthday, Jenny stops Alan suffocating Rita—but continues to stand by her father regardless, although she is torn between her loyalty to him and her love for Rita. Due to his trial plea, Alan is allowed to walk free. He soon returns and starts stalking Rita, causing her to have a breakdown and lose her memory. Rita moves to Blackpool, but her absence makes many residents think Alan has killed her and he becomes the object of widespread hatred and suspicion. Alan soon tracks Rita down but dies after being hit and killed by a tram while chasing a distressed Rita across the tracks. Jenny blames Rita for his death and begins to study Biology at Manchester Polytechnic the following year. During this time, Rita moves into a flat on the other side of the street and rents the house to Jenny and her friend, Flick Khan (Rita Wolf), also a student at the Polytechnic. Jenny drops out of her course after becoming bored and starts an affair with married dentist, Robert Weston (Philip Bretherton). When he leaves his wife, she moves in with him, but the relationship does not last very long, and, in 1991, Robert goes back to his wife and Jenny leaves the street. In 1993, Jenny visits Rita and asks her for £30,000 to start a beauty salon, but Rita gives her £1,000 and throws her out of her home. Jenny later marries a man named Greg Midgeley and they have a son named Tom, who drowns in a paddling pool at age four. This happens after Jenny leaves him unattended while she goes inside to get her handbag to get money to buy him an ice cream.

=== 2015–2025 ===
Jenny is revealed to be the woman that Kevin Webster (Michael Le Vell) has been talking to on a dating website. Kevin asks her to come to The Rovers Return Inn, but she tells him that she wants to put the past behind her and wonders how Rita would react to seeing her again. Later that month, Rita and Jenny meet in The Rovers. Rita is distraught and Jenny storms out of the pub because of Norris Cole's (Malcolm Hebden) nasty comments. Rita visits Jenny at Kevin's house and warns Jenny not to try her "little schoolgirl tricks." Jenny and Kevin sleep together and she becomes obsessed with his son Jack (Jaxon and Maddox Beswick). Kevin's 20-year-old daughter, Sophie Webster (Brooke Vincent) becomes suspicious of Jenny and tells her girlfriend, Maddie Heath (Amy James-Kelly), and Kevin but they do not believe her. Sophie remains wary, despite Jenny's attempts to ingratiate herself. Maddie realises that Sophie was right when she goes home and finds that Jenny has packed a bag for Jack and is wearing a brunette wig. She guesses that Jenny is planning to run away with Jack and tries to stop her, but Jenny pushes her over and vows that Maddie will not be leaving. Jenny mentions that she did not mean to hurt "Tom," and a shaken Maddie manages to escape, only to be killed by an explosion triggered by Tracy Barlow (Kate Ford) setting fire to Carla Connor's (Alison King) flat in Victoria Court.

After Sophie and Kevin leave for Maddie's funeral, Jenny seizes the opportunity to abduct Jack as Kevin agrees that Jenny should look after him, leaving the Websters distraught. She takes him to a flat in Hull and throws a birthday party in her dead son's memory. When she notices Jack is not participating, she shouts at him and sends him to his room. Jenny is later seen on the flat's balcony with Jack, releasing balloons into the sky. Rita arrives after a tearful Jenny phones her, asking her to visit. Rita visits, bringing Kevin and Sophie, but Jenny is enraged as she had asked her to come alone. Sophie tells Jenny to bring Jack down, but Jenny refuses, disturbed by her grief at losing Tom. Kevin tries to reason with her. Jenny returns Jack and prepares to jump, feeling she has nothing to live for. As the police arrive, she breaks down in tears and says that she doesn't know who she is anymore, before she is arrested and brought down. She apologises to Kevin, but he is no mood to listen, and she is led away into a police car. The next day, Jenny is sectioned under the Mental Health Act 1983. In January 2016, Jenny contacts Rita through Facebook. Rita visits Jenny, who tells her she has changed and got a new flat. However, when Jenny runs away, Rita sees the state of Jenny's flat and allows her to stay with her, to the annoyance of Sophie and Kevin.

She later begins a romance with Johnny Connor (Richard Hawley). He takes her to Blackpool for her to say goodbye to her father on the anniversary of his death. Kevin and his friend Tim Metcalfe (Joe Duttine) have taken Jack to Blackpool as well. He runs from them and Jenny saves him from being hit by a tram, earning everyone's respect again. A few days later, once she has appeared in the newspaper, Jenny asks Johnny if she can get a job as a machinist to which he agrees. After work, he goes to teach her and Jenny flirts with him. Led on by this, Johnny tries kissing Jenny, but she pulls away. She still continues to flirt with him, however, and he later proposes to her. They split up briefly but reconcile when Johnny tells her about his multiple sclerosis. On Jenny's hen night, Rita collapses and is taken to hospital. Jenny is upset when Gemma Winter (Dolly-Rose Campbell) tells her that Rita has been suffering from memory loss. The next day, Jenny and Johnny are unsure whether to go through with the wedding, but they decide to get married and go to the venue on motorbikes. After Sally Metcalfe realises that nobody is there to give Jenny away, she decides to do it. Later, Jenny and Johnny say their vows but realise they can't do it without Rita's presence and go to the hospital to get married there. Jenny and Johnny's new life as newlyweds doesn't go off to a great start when they find the factory empty of furniture and even without the roof intact. Upon learning that Johnny's son Aidan Connor's (Shayne Ward) fiancée Eva Price (Catherine Tyldesley) is responsible as revenge for Aidan's affair with Maria Connor (Samia Longchambon), they ultimately disown Aidan and eventually report Eva to the police. In time, Jenny and Johnny forgive Aidan and plan to move to Spain. However, a few days before they are due to leave, Aidan commits suicide and the Connor family is left distraught.

Jenny later finds out that Johnny had an affair with Liz McDonald (Beverley Callard), although she forgives him as he was grieving for Aidan. However, she grows paranoid, drinks alone and puts a tracker onto Liz's phone. After Johnny finds out, they argue, and Jenny falls down the stairs, leading Gemma to believe that Johnny is abusing Jenny. On Christmas Day 2018, an upset Jenny gets drunk and accidentally runs over Liz with Johnny's car. Johnny initially takes the blame, but Jenny tells Liz as she cannot bear the thought of Johnny going to prison. Liz tells the police and they are both arrested. After this, Jenny starts to shut herself away and drinks heavily again. On the day of the trial, Liz changes her mind about going and instead goes on holiday, with the help of Gemma, who Jenny now sees as family. The next day, Jenny and Johnny have a heart-to-heart about their marriage when he questions her on her drinking. They both later realise how much they love and need each other, agreeing to put the last few months behind them.

In October 2020, Jenny learns that Johnny was involved in a robbery over 40 years ago with Scott Emberton (Tom Roberts). Unlike Scott, Johnny got away with it. After Johnny reports Scott to the police for a different robbery, he and Jenny are both held at gunpoint by Scott. He is eventually arrested by armed police and promises to tell the police everything about the robbery that Johnny got away with. The following month, Johnny is arrested and in January 2021, is sentenced to 8 months in prison. He is released early in May 2021 for good behaviour.

In November 2020, Jenny's ex-husband's daughter Daisy Midgeley (Charlotte Jordan) visits Jenny and Johnny with her boyfriend. Daisy has a poor opinion of Johnny, due to having seen him be arrested. She eventually moves into the Rovers Return Inn and tries to split the couple up by introducing Jenny to someone that they had encountered in the Viaduct Bistro a couple of weeks before. Jenny is unhappy about this and tells her that her behaviour has to stop. Towards the end of Johnny's prison sentence, Jenny has an affair with Ronnie Bailey (Vinta Morgan). Daisy finds out and drops hints to Johnny upon his return. Jenny is furious and threatens to throw her out but is persuaded to relent.

In May 2021, Jenny learns that Sharon Bentley (Tracie Bennett) is working with drug lord Harvey Gaskell (Will Mellor) and that she is behind Sam Blakeman's (Jude Riordan) kidnapping. She threatens to report Sharon to the police but is then tased by her. She later wakes up in hospital and is told by Sharon that if she tells anyone about what she did, she will tell Johnny about her affair with Ronnie. In the end, Jenny comes clean to Johnny about her affair with Ronnie, and Johnny ends their marriage. Johnny later puts his shares of the pub up for sale and Jenny buys them in June 2021, becoming sole owner and landlady of the pub. Relations between Jenny and Johnny remain amicable and it is clear there is still a spark between them, even when she begins dating younger man Leo Thompkins (Joe Frost). In October 2021, a storm breaks out, and the ground collapses underneath Jenny, leaving her stuck. Johnny later goes in to save her, and she is rescued after a heart to heart with him. However, Johnny is swept away in the water and dies, leaving Jenny heartbroken.

In March 2023, Jenny goes to attend Daisy's wedding to Daniel Osbourne (Rob Mallard), but Daisy does not appear. Jenny receives a phone call from Abi Webster (Sally Carman) and learns that Daisy and Ryan Connor (Ryan Prescott) were involved in an acid attack caused by Daisy's stalker Justin Rutherford (Andrew Still). Jenny and Daniel go to Weatherfield General where Ryan is being tended to, having been hit by most of the acid. When Daisy blames herself for pushing Justin to attack after having him arrested previously, Jenny assures her that none of what had happened was her fault, but Justin's fault.

== Reception ==
Gary Gillatt of Inside Soap praised Jenny's return in 2015, saying "We're very taken with Jenny Bradley, who returned to the Street last week all cool and confident, and a bit sexy. Extend her short-term contract right now, Corrie!" In 2017, Laura-Jayne Tyler from the same magazine predicted that Jenny would face hardship in her engagement with Johnny, writing, "Jenny may look happy now... but our soap senses tell us that wedding will end up torn and bloodstained, with Jenny standing on the rooftop of Underworld, screaming into the rain".
