= Daisy Midgeley =

Fictional character from Coronation Street

- Coronation Street character
- Portrayed by: Charlotte Jordan
- Duration: 2020–2025
- First appearance: 27 November 2020
- Last appearance: 2 May 2025
- Introduced by: Iain MacLeod
In-universe information
- Occupation: Barmaid; Social media influencer Pub landlady
- Father: Gregory Midgeley
- Mother: Christina Boyd
- Stepmother: Jenny Bradley; Marina Midgeley
- Half-brothers: Tom Midgeley
- Half-sisters: Rachel Parkinson
- Nieces: Lucy Parkinson

Daisy Midgeley is a fictional character from the ITV soap opera Coronation Street, played by Charlotte Jordan. The character was mentioned by stepmother Jenny Bradley (Sally Ann Matthews) in October 2020, and a month later, the soap announced Jordan's casting as Daisy. Daisy made her first appearance on 27 November 2020. From her arrival, she takes a dislike to Jenny's husband Johnny Connor (Richard Hawley) and works on getting Jenny to leave him. Her other storylines have involved her short term crushes on men who are in relationships, becoming involved in a multi-level marketing scheme, blackmailing Ronnie Bailey (Vinta Morgan), becoming engaged to Daniel Osbourne (Rob Mallard), making enemies with Daniel's ex-girlfriend Bethany Platt (Lucy Fallon) and being stalked by Justin Rutherford (Andrew Still), which culminated in her and Ryan Connor (Ryan Prescott) being the victim of an acid attack perpetrated by Justin. In January 2025 it was announced that Jordan had quit her role and would depart the show later in the year. Daisy's final scenes were broadcast on 2 May 2025.

The production team on Coronation Street have expressed potential plans for Daisy to become a villain on the soap, which received the support of actress Jordan. She felt that Daisy has the potential to become an "iconic bad girl" like fellow character Tracy Barlow (Kate Ford). However, since troublemaking ventures, her backstory has been explored with her struggling with abandonment issues throughout her childhood. Daisy has been well received by viewers and Jordan won the British Soap Award for Best Dramatic Performance in 2023 after Daisy's stalking storyline.

== Development ==
=== Casting and characterisation ===
A month prior to the announcement of her casting, Daisy was mentioned on-screen by Jenny Bradley (Sally Ann Matthews), who was phoning the character, and it is explained that despite the breakdown of Jenny's marriage with Daisy's father, she kept in touch with Daisy over the years. Jess Lee of Digital Spy stated that Jenny is delighted to see Daisy again, but noted that she will "cause trouble during her time in Weatherfield". ITV stated that there is "a lot more to Daisy than her sweet name suggests", with producer Ian MacLeod stating: "Daisy might seem like sweetness and light at first, but can be a maelstrom of minxy mischief when the mood takes her. She revels in devilment and can be very self-serving, but she's fiercely loyal to those she cares about - although her loyalties can change in a heartbeat", adding that Daisy's motive is to "bring chaos and conflict into Jenny's life". Actress Charlotte Jordan was thrilled to be joining Coronation Street during the 60th anniversary of the soap. She said that it was especially great to be cast in the midst of the COVID-19 pandemic. Since she is from Surrey, Jordan did not know how to do a Mancunian accent. However, her friend was filming an ITV drama in Manchester which she had to use a voice coach for. Jordan used her friend as a voice coach to "nail the accent down".

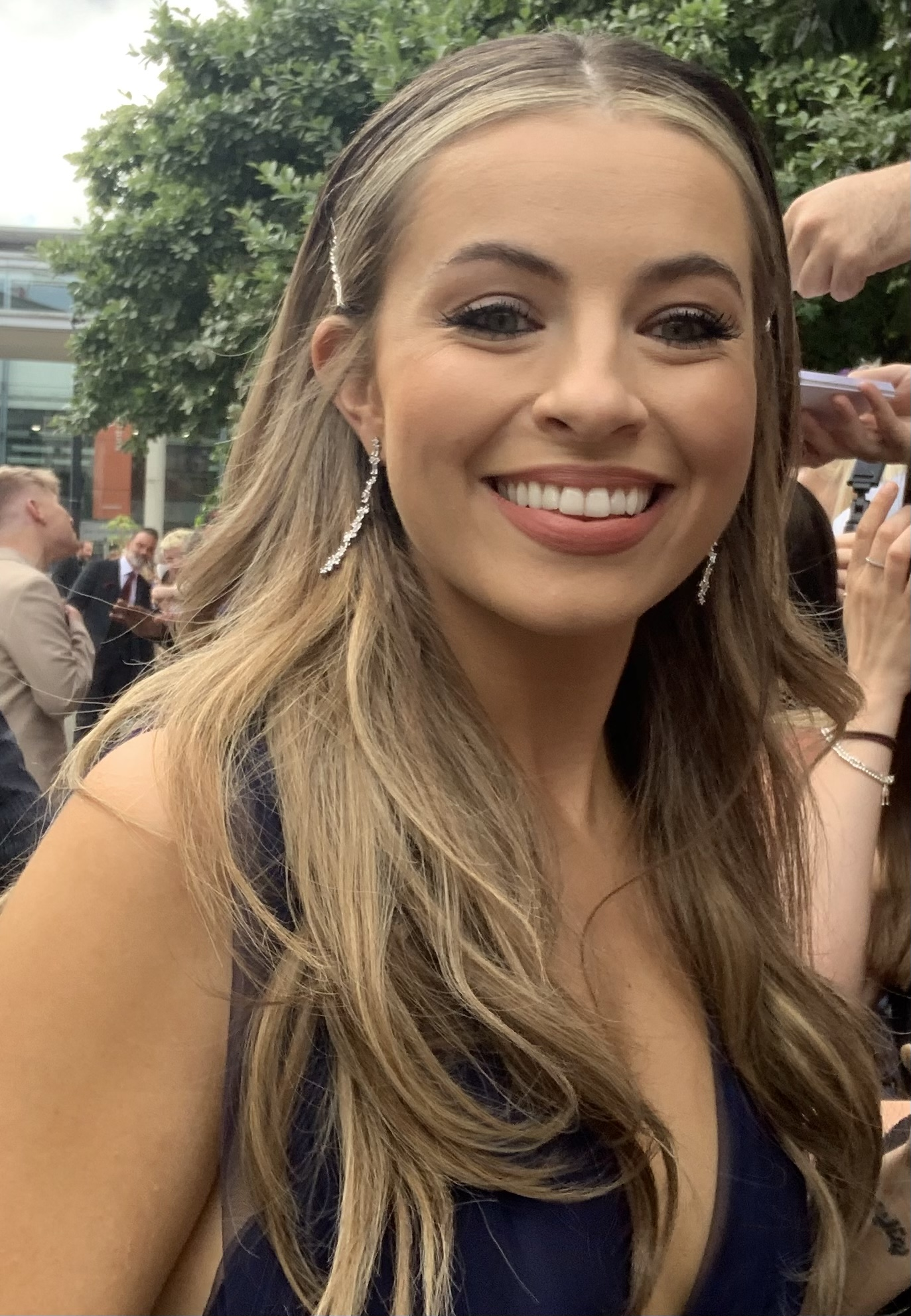
Due to being from Surrey, Jordan used a fellow acting friend as a voice coach for the Mancunian accent.

On her character, Jordan said: "Daisy has been a delight to play so far with her lack of filter and flirty nature but there's certainly more to her than meets the eye. I'm excited to flesh her out and see what lies ahead for hers and Jenny's relationship." She commented on Daisy's bluntness, stating that she does not have a filter and that she tends to say what she thinks without thinking of the consequences. Jordan also opined that there are a lot of routes that could be taken with her character and that she is a "work in progress". She explained that despite Daisy being mainly concerned for herself, she does love Jenny a lot due to being loyal to the people she loves. Jordan described Jenny as the only mother figure that Daisy has encountered throughout her life, and due to the happiness that Daisy associates with Jenny, she wants to rebuild their connection. Jordan also stated that Daisy believes Jenny's husband Johnny is not good enough for Jenny and said that "he needs to go" since "she just instantly hates [him]". Jordan admitted that her character does not go about things in the best way, but defended her actions since they have the objective of making Jenny happy in the long term. Jordan also revealed that producers have informed her of a "potential love match" for Daisy, hinting that they are "very different" to her. Jordan later said that her character sees men as toys and would only get a love interest if she was bored. She hinted that when Daisy does become bored, she would "go around seeing what sort of trouble she can stir up".

Speaking to Digital Spy, Jordan stated that she has had various conversations with the script editors, storyliners and producers about her character's potential to be a villain on the soap. She also revealed that her contract had been extended until September 2021 and expressed hopes for it to be renewed again. She said that as of May 2021, the production team were still deciding "just how dark can [they] make her". Speaking further on Daisy's potential as a villain with Stuff, Jordan likened Daisy to fellow Coronation Street character Tracy Barlow (Kate Ford). She felt that they both will do whatever they can to protect themselves and Jordan hoped Daisy could become "an iconic bad girl" like Tracy in the future. She also felt that playing a character that causes mischief and raises people's eyebrows is a more fun role to play than a regular character, especially since she felt she so different to her character in her own life. Jordan responded to the production team's unset plans by portraying Daisy as both humane and "totally psychotic". Despite her uncertainty on where her character was headed, Jordan liked how Daisy is "a bit of a troublemaker, she's a bit minxy and she's got a bit of a backstory behind it" since it allowed her to "play all sides of the spectrum".

Daisy's afore mentioned backstory involves her telling Jenny that she has nowhere else to go, which leads Jenny to take pity on her and allow her to stay despite her troublemaking. Jordan opined that Daisy is telling the truth. She enjoyed portraying a vulnerable side to Daisy, which she felt contrasted to her character being "fake towards everybody just to get what she wants". Jordan also appreciated having a backstory for her character, branding Daisy a survivor due to coming out of her bad childhood with a headstrong attitude. On Daisy's confession to Jenny about her childhood, Jordan explained: "This is her stripped back and saying: 'This is what happened to me and I really don't want to go, so please don't kick me out, which I think is a really nice side to see of her, because no-one's born horrible. No-one's born a bitch or a villain or whatever you want to call it – they're made that way."

=== Relationship with Daniel Osbourne ===
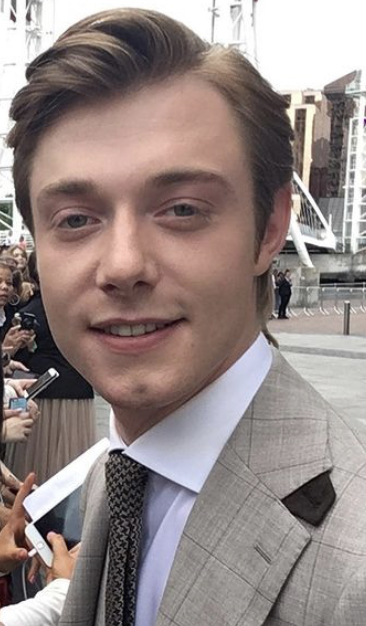
Writers paired Daisy with Daniel Osbourne (Rob Mallard).

In June 2021, scenes of Daisy and Daniel Osbourne (Rob Mallard) arguing aired over him writing an exposé on her ventures with Double Glammy, a multi-level marketing scheme. Viewers then predicted that the pair would embark on a romantic relationship. Months later, scenes see Daisy opening up about the death of her younger brother to Daniel after his son, Bertie (Ellis Blain), has a near-death experience. Ryan, who she is still dating at the time, tries to comfort Daisy but the Manchester Evening News suggested that Daisy had "already firmly moved on" to Daniel. She eventually dumps Ryan and begins a relationship with Daniel, but the pairing breaks apart due to their differences. They later reconcile in a secret relationship since they receive negativity from the people in their life about their relationship. On their relationship, Jordan said that he "brings out the more human side of Daisy", while Daisy loosens his strict ways up. Jordan said that her character's feelings for Daniel are genuine despite not wanting to get into a serious relationship with him. She is a fan of the relationship and enjoys the contradiction of personalities, as she feels that Daniel can steer her towards being less selfish. They later go public with their relationship.

When Daniel's ex-girlfriend, Nicky Wheatley (Kimberly Hart-Simpson), returns, Jordan said that Daisy's reaction would be "ruthless". Since Nicky applies for a job at Daniel's school, it makes Daisy take "desperate action" to prevent the pair from reconciling. Jordan said that Nicky's return to Weatherfield is a red flag for Daisy and due to being a reactive and impulsive character, she instantly acts on the threat. Daisy is initially unaware that Nicky worked as a sex worker, and while Jordan would want Daisy to be understanding, she said that she would not react "as much maturely as she could". Digital Spy wrote that since viewers had seen Daisy sink low in her previous feuds, viewers should expect the same with Nicky, which Jordan echoed. She said: "she does have a ruthless streak. And like I said, because they've been so on and off, for them to just be getting back on an even field and even footing, I think she's going to try and protect that. Like I say, Daisy bring Daisy, she won't go about it in the right way. But it does come from a place of fear and a place of wanting to be with him, and just sort of wanting to protect what they have." She also hinted her excitement for Daisy and Nicky's feud, as she felt that Coronation Street is known for "strong women showdowns".

=== Introduction of mother and stalking ordeal ===
In December 2022, Coronation Street announced that Amy Robbins had been cast as Christina Boyd, Daisy's mother. It was hinted that her arrival would be bad for Daisy, as well as her relationship with Daniel, who she is set to marry. She described their relationship as fractured and distant due to not having connected with her since a very young age. Viewers expected Daisy to be a "ball of anger" when confronted by her mother. However, Jordan explained that by the age of 26, Daisy had accepted the relationship and thinks of Christina as a nuisance. On what Christina's personality means for viewers' understanding of her character, Jordan stated: "I think it helps viewers for sure. It will help them understand why she is spiky sometimes and why she does put up a front because she's had a lot of a lot of things go wrong in her life."

In January 2023, MacLeod revealed that Daisy would be at the centre of a high-profile storyline exploring the dangers of being an influencer. Daisy has a high number of followers on social media platforms and MacLeod wanted a relevant topical story that showcased the problems young women on the internet face. He hinted that the storyline would see "psychological trauma" for Daisy across the whole of 2023. Jordan felt privileged to be given the storyline since she had noticed how not every cast member gets their own story. She also felt it was clever for them to use Daisy, a divisive character. She begins receiving constant contact on her social media and bouquets of flowers from Justin Rutherford (Andrew Still), a man she met at hospital and has since forgotten about. Daisy realises that Justin is a long-term problem once he starts making physical contact with her, as opposed to just online. She repeatedly rejects his advances, but Justin continues to make contact with her due to believing that he should be marrying her, not Daniel. Justin goes to various lengths, including dating her mother, pretending to be Daniel at a wedding fair that she attends, and getting a job in Weatherfield as a delivery driver, just so that he can see Daisy. Jordan did research for the storyline and found that Justin is an intimacy seeking stalker.

Daisy's interactions with Justin see her go from a feisty character who is unafraid to say anything to someone who feels "totally powerless". It also damages her relationships with Daniel and Christina, since Daniel feels she is partly to blame for sharing so much on social media, while Christina claims that she should be flattered by the attention. Jordan was irritated by the victim blaming and felt that due to the "epidemic at the minute with violent crimes against women", the responsibility should not be on the women to change their behaviour, but instead on the criminals. She hoped that it would change people's perceptions on blaming victims, naming Sarah Everard as an example of a woman who had suffered from victim blaming. Daisy goes to the police about Justin numerous times but gets told that Justin has not done anything illegal, which Jordan labelled "ridiculous". Characters suggest that Daisy should come off social media, but she refuses in an attempt to "keep hold of her identity and the things that she wants". Justin grabs Daisy's arm and she punches him, an action which gets her in trouble with the police. It sees Daisy feel more isolated and alone due to their reluctance to help her. Hinting at the future of the storyline, Jordan said: "All the things that make her Daisy – she's extra, she's flamboyant, she's camp, she is big – she just starts to crumble and get smaller and smaller. I don't think she'll ever be the same again."

In March 2023, producers announced that the stalking ordeal would climax in an acid attack on Daisy's wedding day. The Katie Piper Foundation and Acid Survivors Trust International supported the production team on the initial and long-term impacts of an acid attack. MacLeod said it will "explore the social fallout of having your appearance profoundly changed, both in terms of your own ability to process that and how the wider world reacts to you". Following the announcement of the acid attack storyline, Anne, Princess Royal, a patron of Acid Survivors Trust, visited the set of Coronation Street and met with Jordan, Still, Prescott, Mallard, and Matthews to discuss the storyline in more detail. Daisy's wedding dress had to be altered when the storyline was devised, since it was initially going to be a strapless gown. It was changed owing to the need for physicality and security when Daisy is running around after the acid attack.

Following the trial, Daisy catfishes Ryan pretending to be "Crystal". Daisy later begins an affair with Ryan.

=== Departure ===
On 7 January 2025, it was announced that Jordan had quit her role as Daisy and would leave later in the year with Daisy's final scenes airing on 2 May 2025.

== Reception ==
In an interview with Digital Spy, Jordan said that the reaction from viewers of the soap on Instagram were positive. She opined that since viewers enjoy a troublemaker who causes conflict, this was the reason behind her character being well received. She appreciated the "very welcoming and complimentary" attitude from viewers. Jordan also said that the response would likely be negative "if Daisy steps on anybody's toes in the future who are in a relationship". In 2021, Laura-Jayne Tyler from Inside Soap called Daisy a "modern day" version of former character Tanya Pooley (Eva Pope), who she described as "1993's version of a 'proper bi-atch'. Trust us – it's a compliment!"

For her part in Daisy's stalking storyline, Jordan was awarded the Best Dramatic Performance accolade at the 2023 British Soap Awards. The scenes from the acid attack also saw wins in the Best Single Episode and Scene of the Year categories. Daisy's departure was longlisted for "Best Exit" at the 2025 Inside Soap Awards.
