= Luke Delaney =

Australian rules footballer

Personal information
- Full name: Luke Delaney
- Born: 24 June 1989 (age 37)
- Original team: Geelong Falcons (TAC Cup)
- Draft: No. 25, 2009 Rookie Draft, North Melbourne
- Height: 194 cm (6 ft 4 in)
- Weight: 97 kg (214 lb)
- Position: Defender

Playing career^{1}
Years	Club	Games (Goals)
2009–2013	North Melbourne	26 (1)
2014–2016	St Kilda	37 (0)
Total		63 (1)
- ^{1} Playing statistics correct to the end of 2016.

Luke Delaney (born 24 June 1989) is a former professional Australian rules footballer who played for the North Melbourne Football Club and St Kilda Football Club in the Australian Football League (AFL).

He was drafted with rookie draft pick number 25 in the 2008 AFL draft cycle - with the rookie draft held in early 2009 - by the North Melbourne Football Club.

== Playing career ==
=== 2009-2013: Career with North Melbourne ===
He made his AFL debut against in Round 9 of 2011 against Brisbane, performing well against Jonathan Brown. Delaney played 26 matches for North Melbourne to the end of season 2013, where he was traded to St Kilda.

=== 2014-2016: Career with St Kilda ===
Delaney arrived at St Kilda during the 2013 trade period in exchange for draft pick number 77 to North Melbourne to increase the depth of the Saints tall defensive players list. He played his first game for the Saints in round 1 of the 2014 AFL Premiership Season against Melbourne Demons.

Delaney played his 50th AFL match in round 2 of the 2015 AFL Premiership Season for St Kilda against Gold Coast.

He was delisted at the end of the 2016 season.
