= Down to Earth (1995 TV series) =

- Created by: John Esmonde and Bob Larbey
- Starring: Richard Briers
- Country of origin: United Kingdom
- Original language: English
- No. of series: 1
- No. of episodes: 7

Production
- Running time: approx. 30 mins

Original release
- Network: BBC One
- Release: 5 January – 16 February 1995

Down to Earth is a British television sitcom that aired in 1995 on BBC One. It was devised by John Esmonde and Bob Larbey. It stars Richard Briers, who also featured in Esmonde and Larbey's earlier series called The Good Life (1975-1978) and Ever Decreasing Circles (1984-1989). One series consisting of seven episodes was produced.

== Plot ==
Richard Briers plays Tony Fairfax, who upon graduating from the University of Oxford had been appointed as a "cultural advisor" in a South American banana republic (as a university friend was its president) and was used to a life of luxury, only to be exiled back to Britain when the regime is overthrown at the start of the series. He moves in with his brother Chris (Christopher Blake), who finds him work at his landscape gardening business with limited success.
