= Robert Shaw Cameron =

British Actor & Theatre Director

Robert Shaw Cameron is a British Actor & Theatre Director best known as Laurence Reeves in Coronation Street.

== Background ==
Born Robert Shaw, he was brought up in Leeds, Yorkshire, England.

Shaw attended North Ossett High School and then Rodillian High School in Leeds. He later obtained his degree in drama at the University of Birmingham, before attending the Webber Douglas Academy of Dramatic Art in London, from which he graduated in July 2001 with Distinction. He became Robert Cameron on graduation from drama school before re establishing his birth name in his professional name, becoming Robert Shaw Cameron in 2010.

He lives in London.

== Actor ==
Shaw is best known for playing Laurence Reeves, a dentist, in Coronation Street, in which he becomes the lover of Sean Tully, played by long time regular Antony Cotton. His first television role was in 2002 in Ricky & Bianca, a spin-off from Britain's other most popular soap opera, EastEnders. He went on to appear in The Bill, The Wild Life, Where the Heart Is, The Basil Brush Show, Shane by Frank Skinner, Holby City, Heartbeat, Keen Eddie and was the voice of the Quizmaster for ITV's 24 Hour Quiz. He has also appeared in three episodes of Michael McIntyre's Big Show, as the principal actor in the "Unexpected Star of the Show" segment, alongside Colin Jackson and Rachel Riley.

He has also appeared in numerous theatre productions and several new plays by Tony award nominated playwright Bryony Lavery.

Having trained at Webber Douglas Academy of Dramatic Art he has played lead roles in theatre, film & television.

Credits include:

- Feature Film: Ibsen's Ghosts playing Oswald.
- Theatre: The Dresser (UK Tour starring Matthew Kelly & Julian Clary), Prism (Hampstead Theatre & UK Tour), Smoke, As You Like It (New Vic); Dracula, Precious Bane, Death of a Salesman, Othello, A Christmas Carol (National Tours), The Kursk (workshop for Sound & Fury), Blood Wedding, Mansfield Park and Confusions.
- Television: Coronation Street (regular) Michael McIntyre's Big Show (4 eps), The Bill (2 eps), The Wild Life, Where the Heart Is, Shane, Heartbeat, Holby City, Eastenders, Keen Eddie and The Basil Brush Show.
- Also numerous short films and commercials and I was the voice for ITV's 24 Hr Quiz.

== Theatre Director ==
He directed First Person Shooter by Paul Jenkins at Birmingham Repertory Theatre for which he received the following reviews:

"But not only does the production, ably directed by Robert Shaw Cameron, allow us to peer into the gaming world he’s immersed in, thanks to smart video projections, it also uses his situation to explore a profound cultural shift."**** Daily Telegraph

"First Person Shooter is smart and driven."**** The Birmingham Post

"the computer graphics of Robert Shaw Cameron's production are stylishly done."*** The Guardian
