= Sally Ann Matthews =

British actress

- Born: Sally Ann Matthews; 19 September 1970 (age 56); Oldham, Lancashire, England
- Occupation: Actress
- Years active: 1985–present
- Television: Coronation Street; Heartbeat; Emmerdale; 4 O'Clock Club
- Spouse: Nicolas Rhodes (m. 1999)
- Children: 2

Sally Ann Matthews (born 19 September 1970) is an English actress. She is known for playing the roles of Jenny Bradley in the ITV soap opera Coronation Street and Sandra Briggs in Emmerdale.

== Career ==
Matthews was born in Oldham, Lancashire. She played Jenny Bradley, the daughter of the villainous Alan Bradley (Mark Eden) in Coronation Street from 1986 to 1991, making a brief return in 1993. She returned to Coronation Street as Jenny in February 2015.

In 2005 Matthews joined the cast of Emmerdale as farmer's wife Sandra Briggs, but left less than a year later. In an interview with Inside Soap, the show's executive producer, Kathleen Beedles, admitted casting Matthews, well-known to soap fans from Coronation Street, in what would essentially become a minor role was a mistake. She also confirmed she would like Matthews to return to the show in some capacity in the future.

== Personal life ==
In a one-off documentary Coronation Street's DNA Secrets in September 2018, Matthews found out that fellow Coronation Street actress Amanda Barrie, who played Alma Baldwin (nee Halliwell) (1981–1982, 1988–2001), is her cousin.

Matthews' brother Tim was a contestant on a 2025 Birmingham episode of Channel 4's Come Dine with Me, revealing his famous sister to his dinner guests.

== Filmography ==
Year	Title	Role	Notes
1986–1991, 1993, 2015–2025	Coronation Street	Jenny Bradley	Cast regular, 800+ episodes (to date); Longlisted—2015 Inside Soap Award for Best Bad Girl; Longlisted—2016 Inside Soap Award for Best Bad Girl; Longlisted—2019 National Television Award for Serial Drama Performance; Longlisted—2019 British Soap Award for Best Actress
1991	The Grove Family	Pat	Television film
1993	Stay Lucky	Star Nurse	Episode: "Gilding the Lily"
1995–2007	Heartbeat	Paula	Recurring, 3 episodes
1996	Hetty Wainthropp Investigates	Tracey	Episode: "Widdershins"
1996	Brassed Off	Waitress	Feature film
1997	Common As Muck	Claire	Episode #2.4
1997, 2003	The Bill	Anjie (1997); Karen (2003)	2 episodes
1997	Wing and a Prayer	Maria Capstan	Episode: "The Greater Good"
2000	City Central	Brenda	Episode: "Respect"
2000	Dalziel and Pascoe	TV Presenter	Episode: "Foreign Bodies"; Cameo
2000, 2008, 2010, 2011	Doctors	Jenny Carpenter (2000); Shelley Cooper (2008); Louisa Cole (2010); Cheryl Goldsack (2011)	4 episodes
2002	Clocking Off	Female Detective	Episode: "Gary's Story"
2002	Where the Heart Is	Claire Finlay	Episode: "Hold My Hand"
2002	Sparkhouse	Posh Woman	Episode #1.1
2004	The Courtroom	Anne Wilson	Episode: "Mother Love"
2005, 2006	The Catherine Tate Show	Ginger Refuge Boss (2005); Rita (2006)	2 episodes
2005–2006	Emmerdale	Sandra Briggs	Cast regular, 35 episodes
2007	Waterloo Road	Alison Lawson	Episode #3.10
2008	The Royal	Ellen Dannini	Episode: "To Love and to Lose"
2010	Being Human	Orla	Episode: "In the Morning"
2012	Prisoners' Wives	Janet	Episode #1.3
2012	Song for Marion	Playground Monitor	Feature Film
2013	My Mad Fat Diary	Kester's Wife	Episode: "Don't Ever Tell Anybody Anything"
2013	The Mimic	Clara	Episode #1.5
2014	4 O'Clock Club	Miss Aine O'Brien	Recurring, 10 episodes (series 3)
2014	Murdered by My Boyfriend	Neighbour	Television film
2018	Chapter 1: Liv	Olivia's Mum	Short film
2020	Chapter 2: Zach	Olivia's Mum	Short film

== Theatre ==
- Judy (Lead), Framed, the Mill at Sonning, Ian Masters
- Alison, Mum's The Word, UK Tour, Andrew Lynford
- Dee, The Business of Murder, UK Tour, Ian Masters
- Jean Perkins, Funny Money, UK Tour, Giles Watling
- Annie, Table Manners, UK Tour, Ian Dickens
- Joanna Lyppiat, Present Laughter, UK Tour, Ian Dickens
- Jane, Killing Time, UK Tour, Ian Dickens
- Mrs Grose, Turn of the Screw, UK Tour, Ian Dickens
- Suzette, Don't Dress for Dinner, UK Tour, Ian Dickens
- Mary Magdalene/Singer, The Passion/Doomsday, Northern Broadsides, Barrie Rutter
- Lady Montague, Romeo & Juliet, Northern Broadsides, Barrie Rutter
- Octavia, Antony & Cleopatra, Northern Broadsides, Barrie Rutter
- Michele Gray, Blood Sweat and Tears, Hull Truck, Zoe Seaton
- Vicki, My Fat Friend, Oldham, Kenneth Alan Taylor
- Stephanie/Stella Turner, Feed, Bill Kenwright Ltd, Kenneth Alan Taylor
- Sarah Harding, The Accrington Pals, Bolton Octagon, Sue Sutton Mayo
- Raissa, The Suicide, Bolton Octagon, Lawrence Till
- Daisy Hannigan, Biloxi Blues, Manchester Library Theatre, David Fleashman
- Patricia, Here & Now: The Steps Musical, UK tour, Rachel Kavanaugh

== Radio ==
- Iris/Octavia, Antony & Cleopatra (2 years), BBC Radio 4, Kate Rowland
- Toni, Carr Lane Carters, BBC Radio 4
- Nurse Jameson, MY DAD'S A BORING NERD, BBC Radio 4, Martin Jameson
