= List of Coronation Street characters introduced in 2024 =

Coronation Street is a British soap opera first broadcast on ITV on 9 December 1960. The following is a list of characters introduced in 2024, by order of first appearance. Rowan Cunliffe (Emrhys Cooper) made his debut in March, and was followed by Absolutely Fabulous star Helen Lederer who made a guest appearance as Elspeth. Kit Green (Jacob Roberts) made his first appearance on 13 May 2024, as the secret son of Bernie Winter (Jane Hazlegrove). In June 2024, Joel Deering's parents, Anthea and Gus, were introduced.

== Emily Wilkinson ==
Emily Wilkinson
- Coronation Street character
- Portrayed by: Ellena Vincent
- First appearance: Episode 11,181/2; 9 February 2024
- Last appearance: Episode 11,345/6; 23 August 2024
- Introduced by: Iain MacLeod
In-universe information
- Other names: Emily Deering
- Husband: Joel Deering
- Daughters: Maeve Wilkinson

Emily Wilkinson, portrayed by Ellena Vincent, is introduced as the wife of Joel Deering (Calum Lill); she made her first appearance on 9 February 2024. It was later revealed that she and Joel share a daughter named Maeve. Ellena had shared that she had filmed scenes for Coronation Street, writing on Instagram: "Catch this Manc in Corrie! Had a lovely old time back in Manchester filming a few episodes of Coronation Street recently. Loved bringing Emily to the street and working with Calum Lill and Channique Sterling-Brown".

Vincent played two roles at once in Coronation Street and EastEnders with the episodes airing within half an hour of each other. On Instagram Ellena wrote: "In a weird twist also ended up being in Coronation Street last night too which I'm telling myself is the soap equivalent of being in the Marvel/DC universes. Int life funny eh."

== John Perry ==
John Perry
- Coronation Street character
- Portrayed by: Ian Peck
- First appearance: Episode 11,181/2; 9 February 2024
- Last appearance: Episode 11,198/9; 26 February 2024
- Introduced by: Iain MacLeod

John Perry, played by Ian Peck, is a criminal acquaintance of Harvey Gaskell (Will Mellor), who gets in contact with Adam Barlow (Sam Robertson). He made his first appearance on 9 February 2024. Peck's casting was announced on 31 January 2024 and that he would be playing a guest character who would only be on Coronation Street for a short stint. This was Peck's third guest role in Coronation Street after playing a prison officer named Lindworth, and drug dealer Denton in 2015.

John is terminally ill and owes Harvey a favour, so he is prepared to confess to the murder of Natasha Blakeman (Rachel Leskovac) so Harvey can sort out his half-brother, Damon Hay (Ciaran Griffiths), for Adam as she had an affair with his wife Sarah Barlow (Tina O'Brien). Dan Seddon from Digital Spy described Peck's arrival: "Harvey's only chance of success lies on pinning Natasha's murder on somebody else – enter Weatherfield General patient John, who's willing to help them out."

== Rowan Cunliffe ==
Rowan Cunliffe
- Coronation Street character
- Portrayed by: Emrhys Cooper
- First appearance: Episode 11,215; 15 March 2024
- Last appearance: Episode 11429/30; 2 December 2024
- Introduced by: Iain MacLeod
In-universe information
- Other names: Luke Salter

Rowan Cunliffe, played by Emrhys Cooper, made his debut on 15 March 2024. His casting was announced by Digital Spy on 5 March 2024. He met Leanne Battersby (Jane Danson) and Simon Barlow (Alex Bain) at the Chariot Square Hotel where they attend an event together. After Simon confessing to drink driving with Sam Blakeman (Jude Riordan) in the back of the car, Leanne decides to help Simon by taking him to a seminar at the hotel being held by a mysterious group called The Institute. Debbie Webster (Sue Devaney) advises Nick goes along with them as there's a wedding fayre on local to the hotel. On Rowan's character, Digital Spy reported that "Rowan approaches Leanne and offers her some unsolicited advice. Leanne is initially taken aback by Rowan's approach, but she drops her guard when he encourages her to share her deepest thoughts and feelings. When Rowan leaves and flashes Leanne a smile, she can't help but blush. Does this Weatherfield newcomer have a hidden agenda?"

When Rowan arrived in Coronation Street, he begins to manipulate Leanne into The Institute, which begins to cause a rift in her relationship with Nick. This led to him having an affair with Leanne's step-sister, Toyah Habeeb (Georgia Taylor), which Rowan finds out about and uses the information to blackmail Nick into investing into The Institute after he suggests to Leanne that it would be a good idea to invest £40,000 in the business. Rowan, along with Leanne have also been trying to persuade Amy Barlow (Elle Mulvaney) into joining The Institute. Cooper spoke out about the behaviour of his character: "I think that he really wants to open another resource centre, so he's on a mission to raise the investment needed, however he can do that, and he wants to 'help' more people, so there might be some more characters he's bringing into the organisation…." Cooper added that he had "quite a lot of insight" when he researched into the role of Rowan before auditioning, and said it was "because I want to try to make the story as believable as possible".

On 12 July 2024, it was announced that Cooper would be departing Coronation Street. The Mirror reported that he would leave when his story "eventually comes to a close", but the storyline "is not ending soon, as the character's behaviour will worsen and escalate over the coming months." However, Digital Spy reported that Rowan's storyline was "always intended to run for a fixed period of time and set out with a clear beginning, middle and end." After being arrested on 9 September 2024, it was believed that Rowan had departed the series, however Cooper confirmed at the Inside Soap Awards, on 30 September 2024: "He hasn't quite finished his naughty business yet. There might be a little bit more of a twist yet to see, so keep watching and you'll soon see." When asked whether it was important to see Rowan get his comeuppance, Cooper replied: "I think so! It's been so fun playing Rowan. I think he's caused so much trouble that that would have to happen, right?" Cooper reflected on his time on Coronation Street: "It's been really fun, really exciting. It's a very important role, important subject matter. Just spreading the awareness has been a dream come true. There was lots of drama on screen, but off screen there was lots of laughs, lots of love. I made some really good friends and I enjoyed it all, really. Every day was a pleasure. I felt very comfortable with the actors I worked with. They gave me so much, so it was a really beautiful experience that I'll always treasure." Cooper was asked if Rowan would have tried to recruit anyone else. He laughed and responded: "Just the people with the most money, really! It would have been fun to do Ken! But I think it's the dollar amount – the most money would have been the most appealing."

On 4 December 2024, Cooper had announced his departure from Coronation Street. Cooper revealed that Rowan's cult storyline "resonated with my personal journey and childhood," as he had previously revealed that his parents were part of one. He continued: "Getting this part felt like a sure sign from the universe that it was written in the stars for me to return home. I haven't looked back," he added, describing his time on Corrie as "one of the most incredible professional experiences of my life." Cooper also thanked the cast and crew: "Lastly, I want to say I will forever be grateful to the amazing fans who embraced the evil Rowan despite all his dastardly deeds."

== Elspeth ==
Elspeth
- Coronation Street character
- Portrayed by: Helen Lederer
- Appears in: Episode 11,224/5; 27 March 2024
- Introduced by: Iain MacLeod

Elspeth, played by Helen Lederer, made a guest appearance on 27 March 2024. She caught the eye of Ken Barlow (William Roache) during a singles' cocktail night at the Chariot Square Hotel. She sends drinks over to him and his son-in-law Steve McDonald (Simon Gregson). Lederer had already teased a potential role on Coronation Street before her casting was officially announced on March 17, 2024.

Lederer first spoke out about her casting to Digital Spy: "It came out of the blue but for me Coronation Street, of all the soaps, is the most substantial and ironic with such humour, it's really a class act. So when you get the call for Coronation Street you drop everything. And to be offered a part playing a role opposite William Roache is even more exciting. I had met him once before when I sat next to him at an event and I thought what a lovely man he was and so personable. So for me to be offered this brief role was a joy." Although Elspeth is only set to appear in one episode for now, Helen confirmed that she's open to returning to the role in the future and said "The answer to that is 'most definitely'. Ken had Steve to deal with but he was certainly interested in her. He definitely made sure he got her number, he initiated it. So who knows one day he might actually call her and I can come back to Weatherfield."

== Rebecca ==
Rebecca
- Coronation Street character
- Portrayed by: Gemma Merna
- Appears in: Episode 11,240/1; 15 April 2024
- Introduced by: Iain MacLeod

Rebecca, played by Gemma Merna, is a client of Adam Barlow (Sam Robertson) whom he is to set his sights on. She made a guest appearance on 15 April. Inside Soap first reported Merna's casting on 2 April 2024 and Rebecca was announced to be a guest character as Digital Spy reported: "[Rebecca] isn't expected to be a recurring role."

Merna also commented on her casting: "I've wanted to be on Coronation Street since I was a little girl." She further discussed her feelings towards her casting by saying "Can you believe it?! I've wanted to be on Coronation Street since I was a little girl. Being born and bred in Manchester, it's truly a dream come true for me. It's been on my vision board for over 10 years, and finally, I got the chance to walk the cobbles. I can't even believe I'm writing this. I think the best part was ringing my mum and telling her." Merna also told Digital Spy that her family have been fans of Coronation Street: "To my dad, nana, grandad, and grandma, who all watched it for many years, and were huge fans. I hope you're proud of me up there. Rebecca will be gracing your screens in the next coming weeks."

== Rich Pemberton ==
Rich Pemberton
- Coronation Street character
- Portrayed by: Jamie Cho
- Duration: 2024, 2026
- First appearance: Episode 11,240/1; 15 April 2024
- Last appearance: Episode 11,817; 19 March 2026
- Introduced by: Iain MacLeod
In-universe information
- Occupation: Solicitor

Rich Pemberton, played by Jamie Cho, made his first appearance on 15 April 2024. He had a meeting with Alya Nazir (Sair Khan) offering her a position at his Law firm. The storyline was for Alya's temporary exit, as Sair Khan left for maternity leave.. Rich caught Alya kissing Adam Barlow (Sam Robertson), which the pair believed would have disastrous consequences. As a result, Rich felt it was best that Alya came to work at his law firm for a while.

On 26 February 2026, it was announced that Cho would return to the role. A source told Digital Spy: "Rich is back on the cobbles and wants something from Alya. The last time he was here it led to her leaving her life behind and moving abroad for work so whatever he’s got planned might not be good news for Alya and boyfriend Adam." George Lewis from Digital Spy described Rich to be "smooth talking".

== Denny Foreman ==
Denny Foreman
- Coronation Street character
- Portrayed by: Danny Cunningham
- First appearance: Episode 11,252/3; 29 April 2024
- Last appearance: Episode 11,377/8; 2 October 2024
- Introduced by: Iain MacLeod (2024); Verity MacLeod (2024)
In-universe information
- Sons: Paul Foreman
- Daughters: Gemma Winter
- Grandsons: Aled Winter-Brown; Bryn Winter-Brown
- Granddaughters: Carys Winter-Brown; Llio Winter-Brown

Denny Foreman, played by Danny Cunningham, is the estranged father of Gemma Winter (Dolly-Rose Campbell) and Paul Foreman (Peter Ash) who made his first appearance on 29 April 2024 after hearing Paul talk about motor neurone disease and the struggles he has from suffering from it on the radio. His casting was announced on 22 April. Denny walked out on his family in 1992, when he and Bernie Winter (Jane Hazlegrove) split up. Gemma and Paul were two years old. Digital Spy reported that Denny's arrival will cause concern for Paul's family including his husband Billy Mayhew (Daniel Brocklebank), who isn't happy about his arrival, reminding Paul that Denny used to be violent towards him when he was a child. Bernie is also upset at Denny's sudden arrival as she is concerned that Denny might "expose secrets from her past" to her current partner Dev Alahan (Jimmi Harkishin). This will be Cunningham's second role in the soap as he previously appeared as Jimmy Sykes between 2000 and 2001. Chloe Timms from Inside Soap called the character "horrid" and hoped that Bernie would chase the character "out of Weatherfield".

On 24 September 2024, it was announced that Denny would be returning to Coronation Street for Paul's funeral. He appeared in scenes airing on 2 October 2024. As the day of Paul's funeral arrives, Billy is emotional as it would have been their first wedding anniversary. After he arrives at the church, he is appalled to see Denny lurking around drunk. Knowing that everyone will be upset to see Denny again after he tried to steal from Paul, he orders him to stay hidden. On 30 September 2024, at the Inside Soap Awards, Daniel Brocklebank, who plays Billy, spoke out about Paul's funeral episode: "To film it was incredibly emotional. It's Corrie, so the fans can expect it to be moving, humorous, a bit of drama." On Denny's unexpected arrival, Daniel added: "Naughty Denny! What is he doing? He's so naughty. He does turn up. Billy's focus is more on the fact that he's about to bury his husband on what would have been their wedding anniversary. So he's thrown a little bit by Denny turning up. I don't know how much I can say without spoiling it, but it causes issues, let's just say that!"

== Rupert Copley ==
Rupert Copley
- Coronation Street character
- Portrayed by: Peter Carroll
- Duration: 2024, 2026
- First appearance: Episode 11,262/3; 10 May 2024
- Last appearance: Episode 11,834; 12 April 2026
- Introduced by: Iain MacLeod
In-universe information
- Occupation: Undertaker

Rupert Copley, portrayed by Peter Carroll, is an undertaker who works for Rest Easy, a rival of George Shuttleworth's (Tony Maudsley) business. He first appeared on 10 May 2024. During his initial stint, he tried to get George's business partner Todd Grimshaw (Gareth Pierce) to come and work for him, which didn't work out in the end. Sam Elliott-Gibbs from The Mirror described Carroll's character to be "slimey" and a "trouble-maker".

On 10 April 2026, it was announced that Carroll would reprise the role of Rupert, and he returned on 12 April 2026. His return followed George being taken to court, where he lost his case and therefore needed to pay his legal fees. As a result, George ends up facing having to sell his undertaking business to Rest Easy for a knock-down price. Elliot-Gibbs reported: "Rupert is sure to have old rival George Shuttleworth in his sights after viewers learned the undertaker is putting his business up for sale - and there could be more problems ahead for George."

== Kit Green ==
Kit Green
- Coronation Street character
- Portrayed by: Jacob Roberts; Brook Debio (2025; flashbacks)
- Duration: 2024–present
- First appearance: Episode 11,264; 13 May 2024
- Introduced by: Iain MacLeod
- Crossover appearances: Corriedale (2026)
In-universe information
- Other names: Zodiac Winter; Christopher Green
- Occupation: Detective
- Mother: Bernie Winter
- Adoptive mother: Amanda Green
- Stepfather: Dev Alahan
- Half-brothers: Paul Foreman
- Half-sisters: Gemma Winter
- Sons: Brody Michaelis
- Nephews: Aled Winter-Brown; Bryn Winter-Brown
- Nieces: Carys Winter-Brown; Llio Winter-Brown
- Other relatives: Celeste Butterfield

Christopher "Kit" Green, played by Jacob Roberts, made his first appearance on 13 May 2024. He is the secret son of established character Bernie Winter (Jane Hazlegrove) that she had conceived whilst she was with her other children's father, Denny (Danny Cunningham). His casting details were initially announced on 23 April 2024; however, the character's name was not yet revealed. Roberts' revealed he knew about the plot-twist beforehand. He also added that he had quite a journey during the audition process to obtain the role. He said: "I got a call just before Christmas and I submitted a self tape. I actually put it to the back of my mind and didn't think much of it because I think I assumed I wasn't successful after not hearing back. Around a month later I was invited to a meeting, which was more of a casual audition, and after this was the screen tests which still had five people auditioning for the part but in the end, I got it and was delighted!"

Teasing his character, Roberts' told ITV: "Kit is working as a detective and has been brought in to try and solve the Lauren Bolton case and of course is Bernie's secret son. I do think he is going to be a very misunderstood character at first. He's been really hurt throughout his life and although he has a good heart, he has some deep rooted resentment with his biological mum, which will be really interesting to play out."

On 10 March 2025, it was announced that Coronation Street would air flashback scenes to 2007 and would show Bernie trying to make contact with Kit whilst he was growing up living with his foster parents. This episode would feature teenage versions of Kit, Lou Michaelis (Farrell Hegarty) and Mick Michaelis (Joe Layton). On 4 May 2025, Coronation Street announced that Kit would be portrayed by Brook Debio. This episode would show viewers the events that "bind them together". Speaking about the upcoming flashback episodes, Roberts said he was "grateful that we'd be delving into Kit's past to show why he is the way he is". "He lived a completely different life back then, one he's worked hard to leave behind, unlike Mick," he continued. "The arrival of Mick and Lou has definitely shaken Kit. He knows they bring trouble, and now, as a Detective Constable, his job is to maintain peace in Weatherfield. Kit was very much like Mick and Lou growing up, and they hold that over him so he's terrified of his past coming back to haunt him. It was also quite surreal meeting Brook, the actor playing young Kit – definitely a funny experience to come face-to-face with a younger version of myself!"

== Anthea Deering ==
Anthea Deering
- Coronation Street character
- Portrayed by: Carol Royle
- Duration: 2024–2025
- First appearance: Episode 11,283/4; 5 June 2024
- Last appearance: Episode 11,477/8; 24 January 2025
- Introduced by: Iain MacLeod
In-universe information
- Husband: Gus Deering
- Sons: Joel Deering
- Grandsons: Frankie Bolton
- Granddaughters: Maeve Wilkinson; Laila Bailey

Anthea Deering, played by Carol Royle, is the mother of Joel Deering (Calum Lill), who made her first appearances on 5 June 2024 alongside her husband, Gus Deering (Chris Garner). It was initially announced on 15 February 2024 that Joel's parents would be arriving in Coronation Street; however, the names of his parents were revealed on 30 May 2024. Anthea and Gus met Joel's girlfriend. Dee Dee Bailey (Channique Sterling-Brown), but took a dislike to her as it has been described: "it is an uphill battle with Joel's parents Anthea and Gus, who make their disapproval of Dee Dee clear." When Lill, who plays Joel, was asked about whether the introduction of Joel's parents would help audiences understand his past, he said, "definitely. Joel is the middle child from a middle class family. He's navigating that and trying to be good enough. I'm looking forward to seeing how that unfolds."

It was announced on 18 June 2024 that Anthea and Gus would be returning to Coronation Street, and their returns aired on 24 June 2024. They met Joel and Dee-Dee at The Bistro, where Anthea apologised for her behaviour at their previous lunch meeting. Gus and Anthea, however are taken aback when waitress Amy Barlow (Elle Mulvaney) reveals that Joel and Dee-Dee are engaged. On 30 November 2024, it was announced that Anthea and Gus would reappear in episodes airing 11–13 December 2024 to invite Dee Dee to Joel's memorial service, where they see Max Turner (Paddy Bever) pushing their grandson, Frankie Bolton (Roman Thresh) around in his pram. They then consult their solicitor, Cliff to see what rights they have where Frankie is concerned.

== Gus Deering ==
Gus Deering
- Coronation Street character
- Portrayed by: Chris Garner
- Duration: 2024–2025
- First appearance: Episode 11,283/4; 5 June 2024
- Last appearance: Episode 11,475/6; 22 January 2025
- Introduced by: Iain MacLeod
In-universe information
- Wife: Anthea Deering
- Sons: Joel Deering
- Grandsons: Frankie Bolton
- Granddaughters: Maeve Wilkinson; Laila Bailey

Gus Deering, played by Chris Garner, is the father of Joel Deering (Calum Lill), who made her first appearances on 5 June 2024 alongside his wife, Anthea Deering (Carol Royle). It was initially announced on 15 February 2024 that Joel's parents would be arriving in Coronation Street; however, the names of his parents were revealed on 30 May 2024. Anthea and Gus met Joel's girlfriend. Dee Dee Bailey (Channique Sterling-Brown), but took a dislike to her as it has been described: "it is an uphill battle with Joel's parents Anthea and Gus, who make their disapproval of Dee Dee clear." When Lill, who plays Joel, was asked about whether the introduction of Joel's parents would help audiences understand his past, he said, "definitely. Joel is the middle child from a middle class family. He's navigating that and trying to be good enough. I'm looking forward to seeing how that unfolds." This was Garner's second role in Coronation Street, after playing a court welfare officer named Malcolm Fairhurst in 1999.

It was announced on 18 June 2024 that Anthea and Gus would be returning to Coronation Street, and their returns aired on 24 June 2024. They met Joel and Dee-Dee at The Bistro, where Anthea apologised for her behaviour at their previous lunch meeting. Gus and Anthea, however are taken aback when waitress Amy Barlow (Elle Mulvaney) reveals that Joel and Dee-Dee are engaged. Gus made a further return in October 2024 as part of his son's whodunnit murder storyline. Olivia Wheeler from Liverpool Echo described the storyline to have "led to increased screen time for Gus". On 30 November 2024, it was announced that Anthea and Gus would reappear in episodes airing 11–13 December 2024 to invite Dee Dee to Joel's memorial service, where they see Max Turner (Paddy Bever) pushing their grandson, Frankie Bolton (Roman Thresh) around in his pram. They then consult their solicitor, Cliff to see what rights they have where Frankie is concerned.

== Betsy Swain ==
Betsy Swain
- Coronation Street character
- Portrayed by: Sydney Martin
- Duration: 2024–present
- First appearance: Episode 11,296; 21 June 2024
- Introduced by: Iain MacLeod
- Crossover appearances: Corriedale (2026)
In-universe information
- Parents: Lisa Swain; Becky Swain; Carla Connor (stepmother)

Betsy Swain, portrayed by Sydney Martin, was initially introduced as an unnamed friend of Sabrina Adetiba (Luana Santos) on 21 June 2024, when lawyer, Joel Deering (Calum Lill) was beginning to manipulate her and gave her his business card. Betsy pretended to dispose of it, but later went to find him to warn him off. A week later, on 28 June, Betsy begins to blackmail Joel into paying her to keep quiet after realising he has dark secrets. After Joel paid Betsy off, she went and bought herself some chips, which was when she was revealed to be the daughter of DS Lisa Swain (Vicky Myers),who confronted her about the chips and she knew that Betsy didn't have the money for them, so she lied to Lisa and said a friend bought them, showing some tension in their relationship.

Martin told Digital Spy, "Betsy has been brought up by two female detectives, but she seems to have contempt for the law." She also discussed her character's background and her behaviour by saying, "obviously she's lost her other mum when she was on duty, so she already has some disrespect for the career. Lisa stayed on, and that causes a bit of tension in their relationship." Martin also described her character's personality, "there's also this feeling that 'Mummy can get me out of it'. There's this playfulness there. She's a little bit naïve and thinks that the law doesn't apply to her, so she's teetering on the edge."

== Frankie Bolton ==
Frankie Bolton
- Coronation Street character
- Portrayed by: Roman Thresh
- Duration: 2024–present
- First appearance: Episode 11,329; 5 August 2024
- Introduced by: Verity MacLeod
In-universe information
- Other names: Francis Bolton
- Father: Joel Deering
- Mother: Lauren Bolton
- Half-sisters: Maeve Wilkinson; Laila Bailey
- Grandfathers: Gus Deering; Reece Bolton
- Grandmothers: Anthea Deering

Frankie Bolton is the son of established characters Lauren Bolton (Cait Fitton) and Joel Deering (Calum Lill). He is born in August 2024 prematurely after Lauren is unknowingly spiked by Joel. She gives birth to a fighting Frankie who is unable to support his own life. Lauren decided to name Frankie after her grandfather, Francis. Joel also points out his grandfather was also called Francis.

Lauren returns pregnant in early July 2024, much to Joel's dismay. Speaking about the plot twist and storyline, Fitton explained "Lauren has never had unconditional love – she doesn't know what that is. When anyone tries to get close to her, her guard automatically goes up. I think with her child, she will be that child's role model. That baby is going to be with her through everything. She is powerful and she has got someone that's going to love her unconditionally, when she's never had that." Fitton conveyed Lauren's fears for her baby and herself of Joel, adding she is "petrified". Fitton further explained, "Parents will know that your baby comes first – that's Lauren. She doesn't care what happens to her now – as long as that baby's safe, that's all she cares about. I think she'll always make mistakes, though. What is the perfect parent if you've never been one? There's no such thing. You go with your gut instincts and what's right."

== Dorin Pop ==
Dorin Pop
- Coronation Street character
- Portrayed by: Henry Meller
- Duration: 2024–present
- First appearance: Episode 11,336; 9 August 2024
- Introduced by: Verity MacLeod
In-universe information
- Father: Tyrone Dobbs
- Mother: Alina Pop
- Stepmother: Fiz Brown
- Half-sisters: Ruby Dobbs; Hope Dobbs (adoptive)
- Grandfathers: Ross Wilkes
- Grandmothers: Cassie Plummer
- Uncles: Andrei Pop
- Other relatives: Evelyn Plummer

Dorin Pop is the son of Tyrone Dobbs (Alan Halsall) and Alina Pop (Ruxandra Porojnicu). He first appears in the episode originally broadcast on 9 August 2024. The creation of the character was leaked into the media after the announcement of Porojnicu's return had been unveiled. The plot twist was set to "bring up a lot of emotions" with Tyrone. Dorin first appears jumping into a taxi with Alina and grandmother Cassie Plummer (Claire Sweeney), unbeknownst to Alina that Cassie is Tyrone's biological mother. She takes Alina to Coronation Street, where she comes face to face with Tyrone for the first time since she departed the serial in 2021. Fans speculated that Dorin is not Tyrone's biological son.

Halsall was interviewed by Digital Spy about the plot twist. "First and foremost, he's [Tyrone] just settling into married life now with Fiz", Halsall explained, "It's only a couple of years, after a 20-year romance, that they finally got married. He's living this domestic bliss so the last thing he wants is anything interrupting that." Halsall conveyed he "could only imagine" the emotions Tyrone would endure throughout the ordeal. Halsall believed "not knowing about it" and "missing all that time" will stir emotions up for Tyrone on his own childhood. Halsall added, "Obviously knowing there's nothing he can do [about the past], he wants to make a point from now to be the best person he can be in that child's life." Even though this drama would make things difficult for Fiz and Tyrone, Halsall is confident the "iconic couple" will survive the "latest test".

On 1 April 2025, it was announced that Dorin would be returning to Weatherfield whilst Alina sorts out flooding in her house. Fiz agreed with Alina to take care of Dorin whilst she needs support. Tyrone will see Dorin unexpectedly one afternoon after he returns from work. Meller, who played Dorin between August and September 2024 has been announced to be reprising the role. Daniel Kilkelly from Digital Spy described: "Tyrone is delighted by the news, and is determined to make the most of this unexpected family reunion."

== DI Jerome Costello ==
DI Jerome Costello
- Coronation Street character
- Portrayed by: Daon Broni
- Duration: 2024–2026
- First appearance: Episode 11,351/2; 30 August 2024
- Last appearance: Episode 11,763; 1 January 2026
- Introduced by: Verity MacLeod
In-universe information
- Other names: Jerome Costello
- Occupation: Detective Inspector
- Wife: Lea Costello
- Daughters: Lacey Costello

Detective Inspector Jerome Costello, portrayed by Daon Broni, is the head of the CID in Weatherfield. He first appeared on 30 August 2024 when investigating cases against Joel Deering (Calum Lill). Throughout 2025, Costello has appeared more frequently and has been described by Digital Spy's Daniel Kilkelly to be a "tough" and "shifty boss" of DS Lisa Swain (Vicky Myers) and DC Kit Green (Jacob Roberts). Fans were left to believe that Costello was involved with the death of Becky Swain (Amy Cudden), who was revealed to be alive on 8 September 2025. On 5 September 2025, it is revealed that Costello paid a lady to pretend to be someone called Tia Wardley, who told Lisa and her fiancée, Carla Connor (Alison King), that Becky helped her get her life back on track, making Lisa realise that Becky was a good person after believing she could have possibly been corrupt. Divya Soni from Digital Spy described Costello to be "clearly harbouring some secrets".

On 7 November 2025, it was revealed that Costello killed Tia Wardley. Becky's return posed a huge risk to Costello's professional career and threatens her that if she does not follow his orders, he will do the same to her as he did to Tia. When asked if Costello would act out his threats, Broni explained: "I'll leave that for the people to decide. He's said that he would do it, and to think about it, he's got a family – a daughter and a wife – so one side he absolutely would [kill her] to protect them, but on the other side, is the threat of him saying he's going to do it enough?" He continued: "I don't think I've ever played a nasty character in the way Costello's developed, but I always knew my hidden villain was there! I knew that I could do it. It's been nice to play Costello because I don't think he's an obvious villain, it's just threats and a mental game that he plays. It’s been interesting to play that side of him." To his surprise, Becky brings his twelve-year-old daughter, Lacey into the situation and subsequently looks through her social media. Broni explained: "The second that Becky brings Costello's daughter into the situation, for him that changes things. There's an actual personal risk to his family." He continued: It definitely ramps up his reason to go through with it. There's massive risk and it's the thing he's most aware of. He needs to keep his family safe. This is a DI who is speaking like this. It makes it even more fantastic that he's uttering these words and making these kinds of comments. He's in a position of authority in the community and it's interesting to play that dynamic."

On 15 November 2025, Broni revealed to Inside Soap that Costello would get his comeuppance. He explained: "It sounds like, 'That's what Costello is going to do, and he's fully capable of that.' And a part of me think that he is capable of doing it, because he's got a lot riding on this. But I'm going to leave people to decide who the real threat is between Becky and Costello..." So far, Lisa is unaware of Costello's dealings with Becky and he wants to keep it that way. Broni explained: "It's very much a managing of the situation. Me and Vicky [Myers, who plays Lisa] spoke about that, in the way the relationship develops, it's almost like a coercive control relationship, because Costello is managing Lisa and the information that she receives, and managing what she perceives the situation to be. It's a really enigmatic relationship between the two." He continued: "There's an element of massive manipulation. Costello is probably a narcissist. He's very much aware of his position in the community, and how to maintain that aura of respectability..."

== Coral Brent ==
Coral Brent
- Coronation Street character
- Portrayed by: Kate Cook
- First appearance: Episode 11,353/4; 2 September 2024
- Last appearance: Episode 11,355/6; 4 September 2024
- Introduced by: Verity MacLeod
In-universe information
- Husband: Stefan Brent (backstory)
- Sons: Corey Brent

Coral Brent, portrayed by Kate Cook, is the mother of Corey Brent (Maximus Evans) and ex-wife of Stefan Brent (Paul Opacic). She made her first appearance on 2 September 2024; however, the character's details were announced on 29 August 2024. Cook was introduced as part of the storyline where Stefan creates deep fakes of Abi Webster (Sally Carman-Duttine). She departed in the next episode, airing 4 September 2024.

Coral is first seen having an argument with Stefan in court where Jack Webster (Kyran Bowers) is on trial for setting fire to Stefan's office. Abi intervenes and tells Stefan to leave her alone. Coral then arrives at the garage where Abi works and tells her that she is Stefan's ex-wife and Corey's mother. Abi takes Coral back to her house, No. 13, and they talk. Abi tells Coral that her son Seb Franklin's (Harry Visioni) murder at the hands of Corey has torn her life apart. Coral takes the blame for her son and ex-husband's actions and reveals that she is pleased that Stefan's life is in ruins. Furthermore, she also reveals that Stefan doesn't have any friends and Corey refuses to see him in prison. Coral then offers Abi £10,000 from her divorce settlement, which she is grateful for, but wishes that Coral left them alone.

== Andy Garland ==
Andy Garland
- Coronation Street character
- Portrayed by: Andrew Goth
- Duration: 2024–2025
- First appearance: Episode 11,379/80; 4 October 2024
- Last appearance: Episode 11,509/10; 5 March 2025
- Introduced by: Verity MacLeod

Andy Garland, portrayed by Andrew Goth, is an ex-cellmate of David Platt (Jack P. Shepherd). He made his first appearance on 4 October 2024, and began to appear more frequently in January 2025. Iona Rowan from Digital Spy described Andy to be part of a "dark storyline" involving David. After David stole money taken from a robbery organised by Harvey Gaskell (Will Mellor) and Damon Hay (Ciaran Griffiths), he turned to "desperate measures" to try and pay off what has been stolen. He reached out to Andy as a criminal acquaintance to help pay back the money, however ends up being set up.

In December 2024, Coronation Street producer Kate Brooks described the upcoming storyline, which Andy is a part of: "I love the Platts for many reasons. They're funny, they're brilliant and they feel like a real family. What I'm keen to show is that this is Corrie. David's a hairdresser and he's not used to being embroiled with drug barons and gangsters. That's not his world. But what happens if you take a guy who's very ordinary and put him in a world where people are acting and reacting without any thought or consequence? It's really important to show how a normal fella reacts to all of this."

== Logan Radcliffe ==
Logan Radcliffe
- Coronation Street character
- Portrayed by: Harry Lowbridge
- Duration: 2024–2025
- First appearance: Episode 11,384; 11 October 2024
- Last appearance: Episode 11,633/4; 1 August 2025
- Introduced by: Verity MacLeod
In-universe information
- Brothers: Matty Radcliffe; Mason Radcliffe

Logan Radcliffe, portrayed by Harry Lowbridge, is the brother of Mason Radcliffe (Luca Toolan). Logan is set to make his first appearance on 11 October 2024. His character will be part of a storyline which would be exploring Mason's traumatic background as a way for viewers to see another side of his character. Logan arrived when Stu Carpenter (Bill Fellows) goes over to confront him after Mason points out that his brother is watching him from his car down the street. As Stu tries to confront him, Logan drives off. Subsequently, Stu and Yasmeen Nazir (Shelley King), who has recently been uneasy with Stu's growing bond with Mason, are faced with worry after a brick is thrown through their window when they get home. Stu instantly suspects that Logan is responsible as he recently tried to force Mason to participate in a robbery. These events will potentially push Yasmeen beyond her limits. Daniel Kilkelly from Digital Spy described Logan's character to be "ruthless".

Prior to Lowbridge's casting being announced, Toolan spoke about Mason's past: "I think this is the kind of abuse Mason has faced his whole life which unfortunately is what has shaped him into the kind of person he is today. I think once Mason is fully back on screen, we will see little nuggets of things which we will be able to explore further into his backstory and give a clearer insight into his family life." Mason has previously mentioned his abusive older siblings to Stu and Yasmeen and has recently had a black eye as a result of this violence. On 6 January 2025, Logan and his brother Matty Radcliffe (Seamus McGoff) brutally attack Mason and stab him with a knife, which leads to a fatal cardiac arrest. On 4 February 2025, Logan made his final appearance with Lowbridge announcing his departure the following day. Taking to social media, he posted: "That's farewell to Logan... for now."

== Other characters ==
Character	Episode date(s)	Actor	Circumstances
Mr Lee	2–4 January	Stephen Casey	Owner of the car that Cassie Plummer (Claire Sweeney) scratched when she used it to drop off Roy Cropper (David Neilson) somewhere and when Kevin Webster (Michael Le Vell) finds out, they blame it on his wife Abi Webster (Sally Carman). Then when he comes to collect his car he notices that there's a scratch on it and he says that he will press charges if it is not fixed by tomorrow.
Joan	10 January	Tina Gray	Woman who was selling a puppy and Cassie Plummer (Claire Sweeney) and Evelyn Plummer (Maureen Lipman) think that Terry Fensley (James Foster) is using her and later on Cassie went to her flat to find out Terry's address.
Doctor	12–15 January	Rick Bitchell	The doctor of Aadi Alahan (Adam Hussain) who was found unconscious in his flat by Amy Barlow (Elle Mulvaney) and Gav Adetiba (Noah Olaoye).
Doctor	17–22 January	Claire Storey	The doctor of Joseph Brown (William Flanagan) who has lyme disease.
Neil	19 January	Jarreau Benjamin	A man who is working for Harvey Gaskell (Will Mellor) outside prison.
Hannah	20 March – 22 May	Lois Pearson	The new carer of Paul Foreman (Peter Ash).
Ellie Benton	8 May – 16 September	Lola Blue	A victim of Joel Deering (Calum Lill) whom Bethany Platt (Lucy Fallon) went to visit her after to see if she knew who attacked Lauren but she lied to her and told her it was Nathan Curtis (Christopher Harper) as Joel had threatened her to keep quiet. She later appears alongside support worker, Nicky Wheatley (Kimberly Hart-Simpson) to see DS Lisa Swain (Vicki Myers) as Ellie is another victim of Joel's abuse. Swain then tells Dee Dee Bailey (Channique Sterling-Brown) that Ellie was coming to see her with Nicky and they all meet in Dee Dee's flat. Whilst in the flat, Ellie confirmed that Joel had groomed and abused her, just like he did to Lauren Bolton (Cait Fitton).
Roscoe	22–29 May	Warren Donnelly	A friend of Stu Carpenter (Bill Fellows) who is in prison with Roy Cropper (David Neilson) whom Stu asks him to look after.
Felix	12 – 18 June	Robin Morrissey	The new boyfriend of Summer Spellman (Harriet Bibby), who arrives at her flat from the USA.
Maeve Wilkinson	29 July–19 August	Journey Henry	The daughter of Joel Deering (Calum Lill) and Emily Wilkinson (Ellena Vincent), whom Joel takes to see his fiancée, Dee Dee Bailey (Channique Sterling-Brown), and Lauren Bolton (Cait Fitton).
Jayne Chadwick	18 October	Samantha Mesagno	Jayne is the ex-wife of Jesse Chadwick (John Thomson).
