= Sabrina Adetiba =

Fictional character from Coronation Street

- Coronation Street character
- Portrayed by: Luana Santos
- Duration: 2023–24
- First appearance: 9 June 2023
- Last appearance: 11 November 2024
- Introduced by: Iain MacLeod
In-universe information
- Other names: Bec
- Brothers: Gav Adetiba

Sabrina Adetiba is a fictional character from the British soap opera Coronation Street, played by Luana Santos. She made her first appearance on 9 June 2023. Santos sent in a self-tape as her audition and was surprised to receive the role. The character was initially credited as Bec as she initially lied about her identity. Sabrina was introduced as the brother of Gav Adetiba (Noah Olaoye) and a love interest for Max Turner (Paddy Bever). She and Max begin a relationship but this is tested by Max's ex-girlfriend Lauren Bolton (Cait Fitton), who wants Max back. Bever believed that Lauren had been good for Max and was responsible for his character growing up. Sabrina later becomes friends with Lauren and is concerned when she disappears. It is revealed that Lauren was abused by Joel Deering (Calum Lill) and he tries to make Sabrina his next victim. Sabrina's best friend Betsy Swain (Sydney Martin) is then introduced and she warns Sabrina off Joel. In August 2024, Santos announced that she had left the role and her final episode aired on 11 November 2024. Viewers were saddened by the news of Santos' departure and some believed that Sabrina would be revealed as the murderer of Joel despite not being an official suspect.

== Casting and characterisation ==
Luana Santos portrayed Sabrina during the character's run on the soap. Santos was 17 when began working on the soap. Santos' first appearance as Sabrina aired on 9 June 2023. The character was initially credited as "Bec". Santos sent in a self-tape for the role of "Bec" the role in February 2023 and was successful. Santos expressed surprise at receiving the role, explaining, "I was so surprised because I was panicking about everything I did in the self-tape, I was criticising myself constantly. I thought 'it's my first one, I'm obviously not going to get it' and when I got the email I was in college. It was a huge shock". After she received the role, Santos first told her mother and aunt, who Santos revealed had told her that she would receive the role and that she "never heard them so happy". Santos said that she felt very welcomed by the cast. Discussing whether she would be friends with her character, Santos said, "Absolutely. Both my friends and family tell me I'm so similar to Sabrina, especially how much she eats. I think I'd get along with her because we're both really straight forward and quite playful but at the same time she does not let herself get messed about".

== Development ==
=== Introduction ===
Sabrina meets Max Turner (Paddy Bever) when he is doing community service for being part of a far-right extremist group, which Sabrina is initially unaware of. Sabrina is also the sister of Gav Adetiba (Noah Olaoye), who was in the youth detention centre with Max. Having fallen out with Gav, Sabrina pretends to Gav's girlfriend Bec when Max goes to Gav's flat to check on it in order to continue to living there, and she and Max become close. Max' attempt at getting Gav and "Bec" back together backfires when Bec tells Max that she wants to be with him. Bever explained, "Max wants to repay that favour and he wants to show that he's changed and what better way to do that than to repay someone who's been really good to him. So he goes and meets Bec she thinks Max is flirting with him, he's really not, he's just pushing Gav's agenda and trying to make her warm to Gav again". When Max tells Gav that he is dating Bec, an enraged Gav angrily grabs him. Gav is initially angry at Max but discovers that "Bec" is actually Sabrina, his sister. Max and Sabrina's relationship hits a "rocky patch" when Sabrina discovers that he was in a racist far-right extremist group, but she later gives him another chances when as she believes that he has learnt "the error of their ways" and she decides she is going to help him change. Bever said that he would like to see Max with someone who "weathers the storms" with him, adding, "I would like to see him find love with someone who has good intentions for him, with someone who is not going to bring about danger for him".

=== Love triangle ===
Sabrina is involved in a love triangle with Max and his ex-girlfriend Lauren Bolton (Cait Fitton), who was involved in the far-right gang. Max meets Sabrina and develops feelings for her, and when Lauren returns she struggles that Max does not want to get together with her. Fitton explained that "realising that Max was with Sabrina was a kick in the stomach for Lauren" upon her return. Sabrina and Max date for several months but their relationship is complicated by Lauren coming back into his life. Sabrina later reveals to Max that she really likes him but will only be in a relationship with him if Lauren is out of his life, leaving Max torn over the ultimatum. When Lauren moves next door to Sabrina, Max tries to prove himself by becoming official with Sabrina. Bever explained that the situation of Lauren moving next to Sabrina leaves Max "two people that he cares very much". Bever explained, "I see it as Sabrina is [Max'] head and Lauren is his heart, but I think he's acknowledged that his heart is also with Sabrina a bit. I think Max is realising that, actually, just because Sabrina isn't his first love doesn't mean that he can't recognise his feelings for her. Even if you marry someone and have children with them, you'll never love anyone like you love your first love. But for Max and Sabrina, I think she's really good for him, so let's hope that they become a little power couple". Bever believed that Sabrina is a good influence on Max and has helped him grow up a lot. Bever added that Max and Lauren have a bond over escaping from the far-right gang and that they "both understand each other in a way that Sabrina has not been a victim of these things, so she might feel slightly out of the loop in that".

Lauren remains jealous of Max and Sabrina's romance and she is hurt when Max lies to her that he is at college when he is instead hanging out with Sabrina. A jealous Lauren then lies to Sabrina that she and Max are a couple in order to annoy her, so Sabrina confronts Max, who denies Lauren's comments. Lauren ends up getting into legal trouble when she trashes the salon due to her upset over Max and Sabrina following a confrontation with the pair. Fitton believed that Lauren does not have a hatred of Sabrina but instead is just sad that Max has moved on, explaining, "The feelings Lauren has aren't through hatred or spite, but it's just through heartbreak. Lauren is utterly heartbroken because Max was her last resort. She's come back and her whole world has just fallen apart. When things get too much, we automatically explode and take it out on different people." Fitton believed that Lauren and Sabrina could be friends, adding, "Lauren's moving next door to Sabrina, which is obviously going to cause a bit of drama, but I would really like them all to come together. Lauren might not agree with Sabrina, and Sabrina might not like Lauren because of what's happened, but we all make mistakes". Santos believed that Sabrina would be hesitant about living next to Lauren, explaining, "I feel like with her being Max's ex and not letting off him, [Sabrina's] going to be so wary and cautious of Lauren because if she can lie about the extreme, she could do anything. Especially with what little Sabrina knows about her past." Santos believed that Lauren is struggling with not having anyone and that she will eventually accept Max and Sabrina's relationship after "a lot of self-reflection and mental help". Santos added that whilst Sabrina is able to forgive Max for his extremist past but not Lauren, explaining that Sabrina has been able to "go on this journey with Max and get to know him, he's being more open and vulnerable with her about the truth so she can sense his growth". Santos added that Lauren being distant and cold to Sabrina gives her the impression that Lauren still holds extremist views, even if they were "fed to her".

=== Lauren's disappearance ===
Sabrina later becomes friends with Lauren and the pair hang out with Max. When Lauren buys Max a watch despite him being Sabrina's boyfriend, Sabrina confronts Lauren, telling her she was out of order for doing so and to stop playing games. Lauren then claims that she has a rich new boyfriend but does not reveal who it is, making Sabrina and Max suspicious. Sabrina quizzes Lauren about her boyfriend and suggests that the four of them meet up together, but Lauren appears uneasy and Sabrina tells Max that she thinks Lauren is lying. Max and Sabrina later invite Lauren and her boyfriend to join them for lunch with Gav, but Lauren claims that she has broken up with him. However, Max and Sabrina later visit Lauren's flat and find her "sexily dressed", and she reveals that she is making videos for an adult website. Sabrina later finds out that Lauren is being harassed by her ex-boyfriend. Lauren later goes missing and Sabrina tries to help find her and is "adamant to track her down safely", but the disappearance is later treated as a murder investigation. When an article comes up in the paper revealing that Lauren was a sex worker, Max and Bobby Crawford (Jack Carroll) ask Sabrina if she leaked this information to the press. This offends Sabrina, who denies this and storms off, leaving Max feeling "terrible". Sabrina later breaks up with Max and tells him that she cannot be with someone who does not trust her, which devastates him.

=== Betsy and Joel ===
It is later revealed that Lauren's mystery boyfriend was solicitor Joel Deering (Calum Lill), who controlled her and attacked her, beating her repeatedly before she disappeared. It was also revealed that Joel had abused other girls. It was then suggested that Sabrina would become his next victim, with Lill revealing that Joel would prey on other vulnerable women, explaining, "When [Joel] sees these vulnerable young women probably from broken homes, with criminal records and no-one looking out for them, he is like a shark. He hones in on them, coercively controls them and emotionally manipulates them using his power and money." In the storyline, Sabrina returns to Weatherfield Joel finds her upset and distressed Sabrina the police station, who explains that Gav has been arrested. Joel gives her his business card and suggests that she calls him if she needs him. Joel also suggests that there are other ways that Sabrina can pay for the legal fees and suggests monthly installments. Joel pulls a face after leaving and is "pleased" to have found a new target. Sabrina's "mystery" friend notices this "weird" moment between the pair and pulls a face at him; the friend was unnamed and initially uncredited. The friend was later revealed to be Betsy Swain (Sydney Martin), the daughter of established character Lisa Swain (Vicky Myers), whose debut had been teased for weeks. Viewers had previously predicted that Sabrina's friend would turn out to be Lisa's daughter.

Joel later takes Sabrina out for a coffee and offers her alcohol. Joel pretends to pour some alcohol in his cup but does not. He also attempts to flatter Sabrina by comparing her to his ex-girlfriend and saying that he was punching" above his weight with her. Betsy seems to enjoy his suggestive comments. Betsy realises that Joel is being creepy and advises Sabrina to be careful, and then she keeps his card to confront him for his behaviour. Sabrina tells Betsy that she likes that Joel is treating her as an adult. Sabrina realises she has been naïve by trusting Joel and she and Betsy come up with a plan. Determined to make Joel not get away with his "dodgy behaviour" towards her friend, Betsy blackmails him for trying to get Sabrina drunk. Martin explained that Betsy does look out for Sabrina and she is blackmailing Joel partially for this reason, but also because she wants to gain something from Joel from it. In September 2024, Betsy opens up to Sabrina that she was involved in Joel's recent drugging of Lauren by giving him the drugs, unaware that he was going to use the drugs on Lauren; Sabrina offers her advice and encourages her to tell her mother as she could face prison for her actions. Later, Betsy swears Sabrina to secrecy but Sabrina tells her that she could get arrested for potential murder and that the police could trace the drugs back to her, which scares Betsy. After this, Sabrina is not seen for several weeks.

=== Departure ===
In August 2024, it was reported that Santos had left her role as Sabrina and that she had filmed her final scenes. This was revealed when Santos posted a picture of her and with co-star Jack Carroll on Instagram in a dressing room, where she wrote that it was her last day of being on the soap and that she was going to drama school. She also thanked the soap for "everything". The Coronation Street Instagram page shared Santos' post.

Sabrina's final episode aired on 11 November 2024. In the episode, Sabrina returns after not being seen for months and visits Lauren and her baby Frankie Bolton in hospital, where she wishes Lauren the best for her relationship with Max. Sabrina tells Lauren that she deserves happiness after what she went through with Joel, and Lauren tells Sabrina that she could have had the same experience too. Sabrina then quickly leaves when Max comes to the hospital. After the episode aired, Santos confirmed on her social media that these were her final scenes and posted a picture of her first day of filming on the soap back in 2023.

== Storylines ==
When Max Turner (Paddy Bever) goes to check on his friend Gav Adetiba's (Noah Olaoye) house, he finds Sabrina living there as she is homeless. In order to prevent Max telling Gav that she is living there without permission, Sabrina pretends to be Gav's girlfriend Bec. Sabrina and Max get along and flirt. Gav later asks Max to ask "Bec" to return his calls and that he is sorry, but he then finds out that Max actually met Sabrina, not Bec. It is revealed that Sabrina and Gav fell out as Sabrina stole money from Gav before he went to the Secure Training Centre, where he met Max. Sabrina is shocked to find out that Max was there due to being part of a far-right gang after he was groomed, but she accepts that he has changed. Max and Sabrina start dating, but this is challenged by the arrival of Max' ex-girlfriend Lauren Bolton (Cait Fitton), who was also part of the gang. Lauren wants Max back and tries to cause trouble for the couple. However, Sabrina and Lauren eventually become friends and Sabrina becomes concerned when Lauren goes missing and is later presumed dead. Sabrina breaks up with Max when he accuses her of leaking information about Lauren's sex work to the press. It is revealed that Joel Deering (Calum Lill) abused and attacked Lauren and has gotten her pregnant. After Sabrina becomes concerned for Gav when he gets in trouble with the police, Joel flirts with Sabrina and tries to get her drunk. Sabrina's friend Betsy Swain (Sydney Martin) sees this and blackmails Joel. After Joel is murdered months later, Betsy goes to see Lauren and her baby Frankie Bolton in the hospital and gives Lauren her blessing for her rekindled relationship with Max.

== Reception ==
Jessica Sansome from Manchester Evening News called Sabrina "a bit of love rival to Lauren". Charlie Duncan from Digital Spy questioned whether Sabrina would forgive Max for accusing her of leaking Lauren's sex work to the press. Olivia Wheeler from The Daily Mirror reported how some viewers believed that Sabrina was hiding Lauren or knew where she was. Michael Adams from Metro speculated that Sabrina could be Joel's next victim or the one to expose him; Adams believed that the scene where Joel offers to help Sabrina's brother and gives her his card was "Quite the foreshadowing" due to it being "eerily similar" to Joel's first scene when he represented Lauren for smashing up the shop. Charlotte Tutton from The Daily Mirror found the initial scene between Joel and Sabrina "creepy" and speculated that whilst Sabrina could figure out that Joel is behind Lauren's disappearance, she could also be in danger and need to "watch her back". Sue Haasler also believed that Joel's offer to Sabrina was an "uncanny echo" of his first scene and speculated that Sabrina could have the same fate as Lauren by being Joel's next victim. Olivia Wheeler opined that Joel telling Sabrina that he reminded him of his ex was a "creepy twist". Jess Phillips from Liverpool Echo reported how some viewers believed that Sabrina would be Joel's next victim, and she noted how it was "particularly disturbing" that Joel had gone after two of Max' ex-girlfriends. Katie Archer from OK! was worried that Sabrina was in "grave danger" due to Joel picking her as his next victim.

Viewers expressed disappointment on social media when Santos revealed that she was leaving the soap. Joe Crutchley from Manchester Evening News reported that viewers were "gutted" that "beloved" Santos was leaving the soap. He believed that the actress "shot to fame" whilst playing Sabrina and that she had been part of "several big storylines". Joe Anderton from Digital Spy believed that Sabrina played a "big part" in the Joel and Lauren storyline of 2024. Ryan Paton from the Liverpool Echo opined that Sabrina had been "embroiled in the show's major storyline". Michael Adams from Metro believed that Sabrina, Max and Lauren were a "strong friendship group" and he wondered whether Sabrina would be involved in the comeuppance of Joel. Joe Crutchley from Manchester Evening News reported how some viewers speculated that Sabrina could becoming the victim of grooming or even be killed-off by Joel after the news of Santos' departure. Crutchley and Dan Laurie of Plymouth Live and Nottingham Post believed that viewers were "feeling bereft" and disappointed after Santos announced her departure and opined that she became a "household name" after joining the soap as Sabrina. They added that Sabrina had been central to "several major" storylines and called her a "fan favourite".

In November 2024, Angie Quinn from Liverpool Echo and the Plymouth Herald reported how viewers had speculated on social media that Sabrina was Joel's killer, despite not being an official suspect. Following Lauren and Max admitting their feelings for each other in October 2024, Digital Spy's Joe Anderton questioned how Sabrina would feel if she knew about this. Charlotte Tutton from the Daily Mirror reported how viewers believed that she was Joel's killer due to her "sudden" reappearance, with some believing that Sabrina acted strangely in her final appearance. Laura Denby from Radio Times believed that Sabrina was "seemingly on edge" during her visit to Lauren and wondered whether her "sudden presence" had anything to do with the murder mystery. Jessica Sansome from Manchester Evening News also reported how viewers were surprised by Sabrina's reappearance and that this left the "wondering" if she was responsible for Joel's death.
