= List of Coronation Street characters introduced in 2023 =

Coronation Street is a British soap opera first broadcast on ITV on 9 December 1960. The following is a list of characters introduced in 2023, by order of first appearance. January saw Amy Robbins join the cast as Christina Boyd, the mother of established character Daisy Midgeley (Charlotte Jordan). In June, Noah Olaoye joined as Gav Adetiba, a friend of Max Turner's (Paddy Bever). Claire Sweeney joined the cast as Cassie Plummer, the estranged mother of Tyrone Dobbs (Alan Halsall) and daughter of Evelyn Plummer (Maureen Lipman), in June. Married couple Courtney (Stephanie Davis) and Darren Vance (Ryan Early) then began appearing in July. Additionally, multiple other characters have appeared throughout the year.

== Christina Boyd ==
Christina Boyd
- Coronation Street character
- Portrayed by: Amy Robbins
- Duration: 2023–present
- First appearance: Episode 10,858; 23 January 2023
- Introduced by: Iain MacLeod (2023, 2024); Kate Brooks (2025)
In-universe information
- Husband: Gregory Midgeley (backstory); Leonard Boyd (backstory)
- Daughters: Rachel Parkinson; Daisy Midgeley
- Granddaughters: Lucy Parkinson

Christina Boyd, played by Amy Robbins, made her first appearance on 23 January 2023. She was introduced as the mother of established character Daisy Midgeley (Charlotte Jordan). Robbins' casting was announced on 2 December 2022 with storyline details being kept secret. However, it was confirmed that Christina would "shake things up on the cobbles" in her first few months on the soap, with "potential for more appearances down the line". A spokesperson for Coronation Street stated that Christina's arrival would "up-end Daisy's life" as well as explain Daisy's personality. It meant a lot to Robbins to be cast on the soap. Robbins' brother Ted Robbins, who portrayed Brendan Finch, advised her "not to underestimate the feeling of standing in The Rovers Return for the first time"; he told her that the feeling would be overwhelming and she agreed.

Robbins based Christina on a woman she had encountered in real life. At a Coronation Street press event, she explained: "I knew a woman who was doing one form of healing after another, getting one qualification after another. And nobody actually knew whether she was fully qualified, or whether she was just totally making the whole thing up. That sort of, living on the front foot and staying with friends. I've known a few women like that." She described her character as chaotic and a "bag of contradictions". She felt that Christina wants people to think she is confident while on the inside, she is vulnerable. Despite her faults, Robbins found there to be a warmth and likability to her character, if she was given the chance. She stated: "she's made so many mistakes, she's probably full of guilt. In her own way, she wants to make things better but she keeps messing it up. That's what she does, she messes stuff up." Due to this characterisation, Robbins found it interesting to portray the role.

On 15 January 2025, it was announced that Robbins would reprise the role of Christina to tie in with Daisy's exit storyline. Her arrival will come when Daisy is pregnant, but unsure whether the father is: Daniel Osbourne (Rob Mallard) or Kit Green (Jacob Roberts). Rebecca Sayce from Digital Spy described Christina's return as "It comes at a time the pregnant character may need this character the most."

Laura-Jayne Tyler from Inside Soap chose Christina as one of her four "Unsung Heroes" of British soap opera characters in 2025, calling Robbins "ever-funny".

== Rufus Donahue ==
Rufus Donahue
- Coronation Street character
- Portrayed by: Steven Meo
- First appearance: Episode 10,874/5; 10 February 2023
- Last appearance: Episode 10,928/9; 14 April 2023
- Introduced by: Iain MacLeod
In-universe information
- Occupation: Businessman
- Wife: Lou Donahue
- Sons: Jools Donahue
- Daughters: Tabitha Donahue

Rufus Donahue, portrayed by Steven Meo, is a businessman who became a client at Underworld. He first appeared on 10 February 2023. He tries to blackmail Stephen Reid (Todd Boyce), which is unsuccessful and Stephen kills Rufus by drugging him with LSD and pushing him into his home swimming pool. After his departure, he took to social media and thanked Boyce by describing him to be an "absolute dream" to work with. Taking to Twitter, he posted: "I had such a lovely time on the Cobbles. Todd Boyce was an absolute dream to work with. Rufus certainly wasn’t the nicest guy I’ve played, but I had a lot of fun being such a dipstick!"

== Owen Longford ==
Owen Longford
- Coronation Street character
- Portrayed by: Ben Hull
- First appearance: Episode 10,892/3; 3 March 2023
- Last appearance: Episode 11,021/2; 2 August 2023
- Introduced by: Iain MacLeod
In-universe information
- Occupation: Sales Representative

Owen Longford, played by Ben Hull, made his first appearance on 3 March 2023 as a love interest for Jenny Connor (Sally Ann Matthews). Hull's casting was announced on 26 January 2023. Hull had previously played Mark Lacey in Coronation Street in 1995 for one episode. Upon casting Hull's character was described to "set the cat among the pigeons" as it is "not just loungewear that Owen sets his sights on, once Jenny catches his eye..." His character was described as "confident and handsome" and "in the market for romance". He was also described to be a "collision course" for Stephen Reid (Todd Boyce), who has recently had a fling with Jenny and has also invested in Michael Bailey (Ryan Russell) and Sarah Barlow's (Tina O'Brien) business and "won't take kindly to someone muscling in on his turf." Inside Soap described that "the two men may butt heads not just over Jenny, but also over Owen's meddling with Stephen's business given the latter is an investor in Michael and Sarah's fashion venture."

Owen arrives at Underworld as a representative of the American distribution company Nippersnapper alongside Angelique Simmons (Lauren Carse). After Stephen Reid (Todd Boyce) signed a business deal between Nippersnapper and Underworld, he caught the eye of Jenny Connor despite being engaged to Elaine Jones (Paula Wilcox), he became jealous when he saw Owen with her and warned her of his sleazy past. He was also under suspicion of lacing Carla Barlow's (Alison King) tea with LSD, but this was actually done by Stephen, who was later found out for doing so when his murders and other crimes were exposed.

== Karen Rutherford ==
Karen Rutherford
- Coronation Street character
- Portrayed by: Lynn Kennedy
- First appearance: Episode 10,900/1; 13 March 2023
- Last appearance: Episode 10,971/2; 5 June 2023
- Introduced by: Iain MacLeod
In-universe information
- Brothers: Justin Rutherford

Karen Rutherford is the estranged older sister of Justin Rutherford (Andrew Still), who was stalking Daisy Midgeley (Charlotte Jordan). She first appeared on 13 March and was played by Lynn Kennedy. After seeing a video Daisy put up on social media of Justin harassing her, Karen goes to the Rovers Return public house. She informs Daisy of when Justin developed an obsession with her friend's sister and assaulted her when she rejected him. Karen advises Daisy to go to the police about Justin. After Justin carried out an attempted acid attack on Daisy which resulted in Ryan Connor (Ryan Prescott) getting facial scars, Karen goes to the Rovers Return to apologise to Daisy for Justin's actions. After hearing Ryan and Carla Barlow (Alison King) bring up Daisy's manipulative past, Karen passes this information onto Justin's lawyer for his trial. Out of guilt, Karen later reveals to Ryan what she had done. Karen later attended Justin's trial and was saddened when he was found guilty by the jury. Karen made her last appearance on 5 July, however her departure was announced three days later. She posted on Instagram: "And just like that, Karen’s off. Bye @coronationstreet it’s been amazing!"

== Crystal Hyde ==
Crystal Hyde
- Coronation Street character
- Portrayed by: Erin Austen
- First appearance: Episode 10,908/9; 22 March 2023
- Last appearance: Episode 11,141/2; 20 December 2023
- Introduced by: Iain MacLeod
In-universe information
- Mother: Hazel Hyde

Crystal Hyde, portrayed by Erin Austen, was introduced as a love interest for Ryan Connor (Ryan Prescott), who first appeared between 22 March 2023. Upon her arrival, Austen described it to be "surreal" when she joined the cast of Coronation Street. She told the Liverpool Echo: "It's such an iconic show and I couldn't believe I was going to be able to walk down the Cobbles let alone be on the show with so many other incredible actors." She continued: "Everyone from the security guards, catering staff and every single cast member made me feel so welcome. They are genuinely the nicest bunch of people I have ever met. The cast and crew are so committed, so talented – it is like a slick well oiled machine." Ryan Paton from Echo reported that Crystal's debut on Coronation Street has "lit up the screen."

Crystal was characterised as an Ibiza DJ and Austen enjoyed bringing the character to life, but didn't share the same music taste as her character: "I have absolutely zero DJ'ing skills and when I'm in charge of music at a party it usually clears the room. However, I adore Ibiza as an island and Crystal is really determined and strong minded, I think we have that in common." Austen also revealed: "You'll have to keep watching and trust me when I say there are some incredible twists coming up." Austen initially departed on 17 April 2023; however, on 23 October 2023, it was reported that Austen would return as Crystal and she made her return on 6 November 2023. After Crystal's initial departure, Ryan continued to text who he believed was Crystal; however, it was revealed that it was actually Daisy Midgeley (Charlotte Jordan) pretending to be her. Austen departed again on 20 December 2023 as part of Ryan's departure storyline, which saw them leave Weatherfield to have a new life in Glasgow after his one night stand with Daisy Midgeley (Charlotte Jordan) was discovered by her fiance Daniel Osbourne (Rob Mallard).

== Estelle Harrington ==
Estelle Harrington
- Coronation Street character
- Portrayed by: Ruthie Henshall
- Duration: 2023–2024
- First appearance: Episode 10,922/3; 7 April 2023
- Last appearance: Episode 11,260/1; 8 May 2024
- Introduced by: Iain MacLeod
In-universe information
- Occupation: Drama school owner

Estelle Harrington, played by Ruthie Henshall, is an old acquaintance of Glenda Shuttleworth (Jodie Prenger). She first appeared on 7 April 2023 and departed on 14 April 2023. Henshall's casting was announced on 13 March 2023 by Digital Spy and that she would be making a guest appearance. She arrives to make arrangements for her mother-in-law's funeral. She is outraged by George Shuttleworth's (Tony Maudsley) estimate for the funeral cost and berates him, but is shocked to learn that he is Glenda's brother. Estelle reveals that she is the co-owner of a performing arts company, Little Big Shotz, and that anyone can buy into the franchise and open their own branch. Glenda becomes interested, and Estelle agrees that she is perfect for the opportunity. Henshall told Digital Spy that she would love to play Estelle for longer, and said "'After the experience I've just had, yes I would [play Estelle again]'".

On 1 May 2024, it was announced that Estelle would be returning to Coronation Street. Estelle returned on 8 May 2024, when Glenda was contemplating starting up her own franchise of Little Big Shotz, but did not have enough money to pay back a bank loan. Metro commented on Henshall's return: "Fans will be delighted to know that the West End star, 57, will be reprising her role as cruise ship singer Estelle Harrington very soon. Next week to be precise." Henshall also commented on her return and expressed excitement about being asked to reprise her role, "After the experience I've just had, yes I would." Henshall also discussed what she would like if her character was to reprise her role in the future: "I want her marriage to break down, for her to get a love interest and cause a bit of trouble." She continued by expressing her desire to do scenes with Maureen Lipman who plays Evelyn Plummer: "And I'd love some scenes with Evelyn, she would clean Estelle. I know Maureen Lipman – I co-produced her last show and she is just phenomenal. [Or] The Rovers Return needs Estelle and Glenda to entertain punters with the odd duet."

== Gav Adetiba ==
Gav Adetiba
- Coronation Street character
- Portrayed by: Noah Olaoye
- Duration: 2023–2024
- First appearance: Episode 10,946; 5 May 2023
- Last appearance: Episode 11,196/7; 21 February 2024
- Introduced by: Iain MacLeod
In-universe information
- Sisters: Sabrina Adetiba

Gav Adetiba, played by Noah Olaoye, first appeared on 5 May 2023. He is a fellow student Max Turner (Paddy Bever) meets in a secure training centre (STC). They form a friendship, and during their lessons with English teacher Daniel Osbourne (Rob Mallard), Gav is the first pupil to work out the connection between Daniel and Max, as Daniel is looking out for Max on behalf of Max's stepfather, David Platt (Jack P. Shepherd).

Olaoye described Gav as a lovable rogue. He opined that Gav is not a bully or someone who throws his weight around, but is instead "genuinely a likeable guy [who has] a screw loose so there is that side to him where people are afraid of him". He warned that Gav would do something unhinged if a character were to get on his wrong side. He is bored in the STC and wants to cure his boredom, believing that he may as well have fun while he is there. Olaoye admitted that before being cast, he searched into the people he would be working with. He discovered that Bever had won a National Television Award and "was like, 'No pressure then!'". He was at Huddersfield railway station when he learned of his casting and recalled standing around for five minutes trying to take the news in.

Max naturally gravitates to Gav since he is "the unofficial head boy" of the class. Olaoye explained: "People acknowledge Gav as 'the guy', and you don't mess with Gav otherwise you are going to have a problem. He is not an authoritative figure, just his presence and his aura alone let people know you don't mess with him." Olaoye said that Gav's friendship with Max is genuine due to their similarities. Due to the STC being a "quite lonely and there [being a] lot of bravado around", critics liked that their friendship gave each other someone to depend on. Olaoye hinted that there would be ups and downs for the friendship, but that they would bring out the best in each other and develop a "beautiful bond".

== Isabella Benvenuti ==
Isabella Benvenuti
- Coronation Street character
- Portrayed by: Flaminia Cinque
- First appearance: Episode 10,598/9; 19 May 2023
- Last appearance: Episode 11,011/2; 21 July 2023
- Introduced by: Iain MacLeod
In-universe information
- Other relatives: Brian Packham

Isabella Benvenuti is the distant cousin of Brian Packham (Peter Gunn). She first appears on 19 May 2023 and is played by Flaminia Cinque. Isabella stays with Brian while builders are fixing her house in Naples. Isabella and Brian begin to hit off meanwhile Mary Taylor (Patti Clare) gets jealous of all the time Isabella is spending with Brian. Brian then begins to get fed up of Isabella's confrontational and blunt personality, and tries to call the builders to see how long they will be; however, Isabella finds out what he did and she confronts him. Brian tries to tell her to go while being as polite as possible, until Mary interrupts and tells Isabella that she and Brian are a couple and want to move into together. Isabella believes her and leaves to go back to Naples on 21 July 2023.

Laura-Jayne Tyler from Inside Soap commented on a scene involving the character, writing, "There are grudge matches on the wrestling channels less fierce than when Rita Tanner (Barbara Knox) laid the smack-down on Isabella. Corrie should have made it a special pay-per-view event".

== Sabrina Adetiba ==
Sabrina Adetiba, played by Luana Santos, is the younger sister of Gav Adetiba (Noah Olaoye) and girlfriend of Max Turner (Paddy Bever). She initially introduced herself to Max as Bec, as the ex-girlfriend of Gav, who ended their relationship prior to Gav being in a secure training centre (STC). He asks Max to track her down for him. He meets up with Sabrina and the two instantly begin flirting, developing a secret relationship. However, she learns that Max was in the STC for an Islamophobic hate crime, and due to being black, she believes that Max is using her as a token. When Gav is released from prison, Max admits that he is dating who he believes to be Bec, but Gav reveals that she is his sister, Sabrina.

== Cassie Plummer ==
Cassie Plummer
- Coronation Street character
- Portrayed by: Claire Sweeney
- Duration: 2023–2026
- First appearance: Episode 10,991; 28 June 2023
- Last appearance: Episode 11,914; 3 August 2026
- Introduced by: Iain MacLeod
- Crossover appearances: Corriedale (2026)
In-universe information
- Father: Harold Plummer
- Mother: Evelyn Plummer
- Sons: Tyrone Dobbs
- Grandsons: Dorin Pop
- Granddaughters: Ruby Dobbs; Hope Dobbs (adoptive)

Cassandra "Cassie" Plummer, played by Claire Sweeney, made her first appearance on 28 June 2023. She was introduced as the estranged mother of Tyrone Dobbs (Alan Halsall), who was led to believe that she had died from a heroin overdose by her mother, Evelyn Plummer (Maureen Lipman). Cassandra's backstory involves leaving Tyrone at a station due to her feeling unable to care for him and having a drug addiction. The Metro's Calli Kitson said that her arrival on the soap would cause a dilemma for Evelyn, who has to decide if she will admit her lies to Tyrone.

Sweeney's casting was announced on 21 April 2023 and she began filming later that month. On her casting, she said: "Even though I've been lucky enough to have enjoyed an amazingly varied career for nearly 40 years – being cast in Coronation Street is, to me, better than being cast in a Hollywood movie!" Sweeney said that she had watched the soap for her entire life and was in shock that she was able to walk on the cobbles. She was nervous to audition since the show meant a lot to her and was "beyond thrilled and grateful" when she learned that she would be playing Tyrone's mother and working alongside Lipman, a "hero" of hers. Of Sweeney and her character, Coronation Street executive producer Iain MacLeod said that she impressed the production team in her audition and described her scenes with Tyrone and Evelyn as "electric". Her granddaughter Hope finds her unconscious following a drug overdose, after promising to stay clean.

== Darren Vance ==
Darren Vance
- Coronation Street character
- Portrayed by: Ryan Early
- First appearance: Episode 11007/08; 17 July 2023
- Last appearance: Episode 11109/10; 13 November 2023
- Introduced by: Iain MacLeod
In-universe information
- Wife: Courtney Vance

Darren Vance, played by Ryan Early, made his first appearance on 17 July 2023. Darren was introduced alongside wife Courtney (Stephanie Davis). It was confirmed that from the offset of their introductions, Courtney would embark on an affair with teenager Aadi Alahan (Adam Hussain). Darren partners on a business project with Aadi's father, Dev Alahan (Jimmi Harkishin), which leads to Courtney meeting Aadi and beginning an affair.

On his casting, Early said: "I am so thrilled to be playing Darren Vance on Coronation Street and joining the most iconic soap. I grew up watching the show with my grandmother so to walk on the cobbles is such an honour." Executive producer Iain MacLeod stated that the couple will be "nothing but drama" during their stint on the cobbles. He said: "In Stephanie and Ryan, we have cast two fantastic actors as the catalyst for this fun, fiery storyline".

== Courtney Vance ==
Courtney Vance
- Coronation Street character
- Portrayed by: Stephanie Davis
- First appearance: Episode 11009/10; 19 July 2023
- Last appearance: Episode 11109/10; 13 November 2023
- Introduced by: Iain MacLeod
In-universe information
- Husband: Darren Vance

Courtney Vance, played by Stephanie Davis, made her first appearance on 19 July 2023. Upon her introduction, she becomes a romantic interest for teenager Aadi Alahan (Adam Hussain). It was confirmed that Courtney's relationship with Aadi would be an affair, since Davis' casting was announced alongside that of Ryan Early, who portrays her husband, Darren (Ryan Early). Davis and Early began filming for the soap in May 2023.

Davis expressed her excitement at being cast on Coronation Street since she had grown up watching the soap. She said: "to be part of the biggest TV soap in Britain, which is in the hearts and homes of so many people, is an honour." Executive producer Iain MacLeod stated that the couple will be "nothing but drama" during their stint on the cobbles. He said: "In Stephanie and Ryan, we have cast two fantastic actors as the catalyst for this fun, fiery storyline". She begins an affair with the son of her husband's business partner Aadi Alahan (Adam Hussain).

== Shelly Rossington ==
Shelly Rossington
- Coronation Street character
- Portrayed by: Natalie Amber
- First appearance: Episode 11,016; 24 July 2023
- Last appearance: Episode 11,057; 13 September 2023
- Introduced by: Iain MacLeod
In-universe information
- Brothers: Kieran Rossington

Shelly Rossington, played by Natalie Amber, is a woman who Paul Foreman (Peter Ash) meets outside of a motor neurone disease support group. She first appeared on 24 July 2023 and her casting was announced a week prior: "Shelly wheels into Weatherfield on tonight's Corrie." Shelly really enjoyed gospel music. Paul gets scared as he fears he might end up like her and decides not to go into the support group. Seeing Shelly makes Paul consider Billy Mayhew (Daniel Brocklebank) to assist with his death. Paul meets up with Shelly at the hospital and talk about their different views on having MND, making Paul reconsider about making Billy kill him.

On 13 September 2023, Shelly's death was aired, leaving Paul absolutely devastated. At Shelly's funeral, Paul and her brother Kieran end up having a fight as Paul gives a talk about Shelly's life, which her brother objects to, leading to Paul telling him off for not being there for her when she died. On 2 August 2024, Amber told Digital Spy that Ash and Brocklebank went "above and beyond" for her on set, when praising her experiences on Coronation Street.

== Dom Everett ==
Dom Everett
- Coronation Street character
- Portrayed by: Darren Morfitt
- Duration: 2023–2024
- First appearance: Episode 11,024; 4 August 2023
- Last appearance: Episode 11,214/5; 15 March 2024
- Introduced by: Iain MacLeod
In-universe information
- Sons: Ben Everett
- Daughters: Eliza Woodrow

Dom Everett, played by Darren Morfitt, is the estranged father of Eliza Woodrow, who is in the care of her grandfather Stu Carpenter (Bill Fellows) and his partner Yasmeen Metcalfe (Shelley King) after her mother Bridget Woodrow (Beth Vyse) and her grandmother Lucy Woodrow (Lynda Rooke) are sent down for a murder that they framed Stu for, who spent 27 years in prison for the crime. He made his first appearance on 4 August 2023, and was described to be "certainly no stranger to the small screen." According to The Mirror, his arrival in Coronation Street is "set to make him even more of a household name, as he embarks on turning the relatively peaceful of life of Stu Carpenter completely upside down. But this is only once his true intentions of his arrival unfold. Dom seemingly wants to reconnect with his estranged daughter Eliza as her mother Bridget has been sent to prison for a past crime she committed."

It had also been revealed that Dom's arrival was not meant only to build a relationship with Eliza as "Dom later finds out that Stu Carpenter, who is Eliza's grandfather, is loaded following a hefty compensations following his wrongful imprisonment". Dom's makes Stu feel uncertain and after phoning Bridget in prison, she tells him to not allow him to have contact as he was not interested in being a father when Eliza was born. Eventually, Stu and Dom ended up having a custody battle, but Eliza chose to live with Dom. However, Dom told Stu he would back off if he was paid enough money for it, making Stu question Dom's real motives. Stu hired a private detective to find out more information about Dom, which was then discovered that Dom has a wife and a son called Ben living abroad, so he then departs on 15 December 2023 to be with his family, leaving Eliza in Stu and Yasmeen's care. Fellows, who plays Stu, commented on the storyline: "Eliza gets upset over wanting to live with Dom and she basically disappears, so Stu wakes up the next morning and she's gone. Stu thinks Dom has come and taken her but it's not true, she's actually freely gone to Dom, it leads to a big confrontation between them and Dom is basically like, if you're not gonna give me that money I'll make sure you suffer."

His return to Coronation Street was officially announced on 29 February 2024, and Dom returned on 6 March 2024. Executive producer Iain MacLeod described the storyline to be "incredibly poignant" and that Stu would make "some incredibly bad decisions". He continued by explaining how it would impact his relationship with Yasmeen: "Stu will seriously endanger his relationship with Yasmeen. After Geoff and Sharif, Yasmeen has profound trust issues when it comes to men – and Stu's behaviour around this story will give her, at the very least, serious pause for thought." However, Dom asked Eliza if she would like to come and live with him and his family in Germany and they both departed on 15 March 2024.

== Joel Deering ==
Joel Deering
- Coronation Street character
- Portrayed by: Calum Lill
- Duration: 2023–2025
- First appearance: Episode 11,054; 7 September 2023
- Last appearance: Episode 11,375; 30 September 2024 (appearance); Episode 11,604; 23 June 2025 (hallucination)
- Introduced by: Iain MacLeod
In-universe information
- Occupation: Solicitor
- Father: Gus Deering
- Mother: Anthea Deering
- Wife: Emily Wilkinson
- Sons: Frankie Bolton
- Daughters: Maeve Wilkinson; Laila Bailey
- Grandfathers: Francis Deering

Joel Deering, played by Calum Lill, made his first appearance on the 7 September 2023. He was first introduced as the duty solicitor for Lauren Bolton (Cait Fitton), and is Dee Dee Bailey's (Channique Sterling-Brown) new love interest. Sterling-Brown talked to Digital Spy about the upcoming storyline. "We're going to see her go on a bit of a dating journey. Her life is a mixture of fun but chaos, and I think fans will really enjoy seeing her try to navigate that world. When she's in the courtroom, she's totally in control. I think it's going to be really fun to see her struggle to quite work things out, so that's what we've got coming up. She's probably missed all sorts of romantic opportunities because she's had her head either in the clouds or in the courtroom!" Their relationship began to run smoothly, until February 2024, when Joel began meeting up with another woman named Emily Wilkinson (Ellena Vincent). She was later revealed to be his wife, who he was getting divorced from. She also revealed that they also had a daughter together, Maeve Wilkinson, and that they were starting divorce proceedings because Joel had cheated on her.

It was announced on 15 February 2024 that Joel's parents would be arriving in Coronation Street; however, the names of his parents were revealed on 28 May 2024 to be Gus Deering (Chris Garner) and Anthea Deering (Carol Royle), who first appeared on 5 June 2024. It has been revealed that they are set to meet Dee Dee, who he will propose to. However, they are set to take a dislike to her as it has been described, "it is an uphill battle with Joel's parents Anthea and Gus, who make their disapproval of Dee Dee clear." Anthea is also set to cause Dee Dee some upset and "when she makes a patronising remark, Dee Dee storms out." When Lill, who plays Joel, was asked about whether the introduction of Joel's parents would help audiences understand his past, he said, "Definitely. Joel is the middle child from a middle class family. He's navigating that and trying to be good enough. I'm looking forward to seeing how that unfolds." Joel was murdered by his grooming victim, Lauren Bolton on 27 September 2024. His final scenes aired on 18 November 2024.

== Mason Radcliffe ==
Mason Radcliffe
- Coronation Street character
- Portrayed by: Luca Toolan
- Duration: 2023–2025
- First appearance: Episode 11055; 11 September 2023
- Last appearance: Episode 11459; 3 February 2025
- Introduced by: Iain MacLeod
In-universe information
- Occupation: Student; Waiter
- Brothers: Logan Radcliffe; Matty Radcliffe

Mason Radcliffe, played by Luca Toolan, first appeared in September 2023. Toolan announced his casting on social media saying: "There's a new kid joining the cobbles – Mason Radcliffe. It's an honour to be a part of a show that I've grown up on that has some of the warmest and most talented people." He was introduced as part of a bullying story line and first appeared when he first targeted Ruby Dobbs (Billie Naylor) before recruiting others to help him bully her more. For his role as Mason, Radcliffe was longlisted for "Best Villain" at the 2024 Inside Soap Awards.

Mason catches the attentions of Dylan Wilson (Liam McCheyne) and Ryan's adoptive cousin Liam Connor (Charlie Wrenshall). Mason, Dylan and Liam witnessed Tyrone Dobbs (Alan Halsall) talking to a police officer about his car being stolen and used in a hit and run which injured Eliza Woodrow. A shocked Mason fled and later told Dylan and Liam that he was the one who stole Tyrone's car and had caused the accident and tells them to give him an alibi. Amy Jones from OK! suggested the story line was impactual by saying: "Coronation Street star Luca Toolan certainly made an impact when he joined the ITV soap earlier this year as bad boy Mason Radcliffe. Recently we've watched Mason rule the cobbles as he continues to influence those around him by leading them astray, particularly when it comes to young Dylan Wilson (Liam McCheyne). Just last month, we saw Dylan, Mason and Liam Connor picking on Ruby Dobbs in the heartwrenching school bullying storyline."

At Weatherfield High, Mason and his friends teased Ryan Connor (Ryan Prescott) over his scars (which he got after being involved in an acid attack) but backed away when Ryan shouted at them. Daniel Osbourne (Rob Mallard) intervenes and makes Mason and his friends leave. Mason later encouraged Dylan and Liam to smoke a disposable vape pen, which makes Dylan feel sick and Liam suffer a severe asthma attack. Mason runs off, leaving Dylan to call an ambulance. Mason and his friends later mocked Amy Barlow (Elle Mulvaney) and her fellow protesters placards. This resulted in Amy nearly hitting Mason with one of the placards before police intervened and sent Mason and his friends on their way.

After learning that Dylan's father Sean Tully (Antony Cotton) had disposed of their remaining vapes, Mason demanded that Dylan give him his designer trainers, which Sean had got him, as compensation for the lose of the vapes. After Sean discovered that Dylan's trainers were missing, he planned to go to the school about it. This caused Dylan to inform Mason of Sean's intentions. Not wanting to get into trouble, Mason framed Liam by placing the trainers in his school locker. Later, Mason was confronted by Liam's stepfather Gary Windass (Mikey North), who guessed that Mason had framed Liam. Gary warned Mason to stay away from Liam or else he would see more of him and next time, he would not be so friendly. Mason later sent a threatening voicemail to Liam in retaliation. At school, Mason warned Liam not to tell on him again or else his mother Maria Connor (Samia Longchambon) would suffer.

Mason and his friends later confronted Liam and threw rubbish on him and called him a rat. Dylan witnessed the event, but did not intervene out of fear of Mason. When Mason started filming Liam on his phone, the latter retaliated and knocked the phone out of Mason's hand. This resulted in Mason threatening Liam with a knife. Mason was later approached by local police officer Craig Tinker (Colson Smith) and another police officer, who searched Mason for the knife, but did not find it on him. It was later revealed that Mason had Dylan hide the knife. Mason believed that Liam was the one who reported him to the police and sent him a vile picture of a rat, unaware that it was in fact Liam's stepbrother Jake Windass (Bobby Bradshaw) who had phoned the police.

Mason and Dylan later bunked off school and stole a box of vapes from Simon Barlow and went to Dylan's home. Afterwards, Simon's father Peter Barlow (Chris Gascoyne) arrived outside the House to confront the pair over the theft and threatened to break down the door. Upon learning from Dylan that Peter killed Stephen Reid (Todd Boyce), Mason challenged Peter to run him and Dylan over with his car. Outraged, Peter kicked open the door, causing Mason to flee the house in fear whilst Peter restrained Dylan. Later, Dylan tells Mason that he had hidden the vapes and the knife in a bin, to which Mason tells him to sell the vapes at Prima Doner and that he will collect the money whilst Dylan can keep the knife. After Liam got Dylan into trouble at school by questioning him about selling vapes, which was overheard by their headteacher, Mason confronted Liam and opened his bag and threw the contents to the ground before throwing the bag on top of a van as a warning to Liam to not interfere with his business again. Mason also videoed Liam struggling to retrieve his bag, which Liam later saw footage of.

In January 2024, Mason stole Liam's phone at school and made him to beg in front of other students order to have it back. After Liam does this, Mason changes his mind and refuses to return the phone. Mason later pinned Liam to a wall, but Liam manages to escape by setting off the school's fire alarm. Mason reports what Liam did to the school's deputy headmistress Orla Crawshaw (Carla Mendonça) and later contacts Jake on his PlayStation 4 and tells him to tell Liam that if he wants his phone back, he will have to meet him at school the following day. Liam tells Jake to ignore the message as he thinks that meeting with Mason would lead to a fight, but following a talk with Gary about how bullies only understand violence, Liam decides that he will stand up to Mason. The following day, Mason gives Liam back his phone but then goads him into fighting Dylan, who had referred to Liam as a loser. Mrs Crawshaw arrives and breaks up the fight. Mason claims that Liam attacked Dylan for no reason, to which Liam agrees, out of worry of what the outcome would be if he told the truth. This results in Liam getting suspended from school.

When Liam returns to school, Mason destroys a puppet he brought into school whilst Dylan films the scene on his phone. Mason later learns from Dylan that Maria had seen abusive messages they had sent Liam online, resulting in them deleting the messages in order to avoid punishment. Mason and Dylan are later confronted by Maria, who was returning a laptop Liam borrowed from school. She tells them that Liam would be moving schools because of them. Dylan began to feel bad about his actions whilst Mason treated the situation like a joke. After Mrs Crawshaw learnt that Liam used the laptop to search about suicide, she tells Maria, Gary and Liam that she would put Mason and Dylan into isolation for their actions towards Liam. Mason and Dylan later had a confrontation with Gary in the local playground with Mason warning Gary that Liam needs to watch his back. This causes Gary to lash out at Mason and throw him to the ground. Sean witnesses this and intervenes by threatening to report Gary to the police. Mason later visits Dylan and learns that Sean is now aware that Liam is being bullied. Mason warns Dylan not to mention him to Mrs Crawshaw.

Mason later came across a remorseful Dylan about knock on Liam to apologise for his behaviour. Dylan claims that he was pressured by Sean into going to Liam. Mason tells Dylan not to speak to Liam and has him leave with him. Mason later texts Dylan and tells him not to mention his name to Mrs Crawshaw. However, this results in Dylan getting suspended from school by Mrs Crawshaw after he blamed only himself for Liam getting bullied and would not say who was also involved. Mason later visits Roy's Rolls where Liam, Maria and Gary are. Mason tries to act friendly towards Liam, only for Maria to confront him and tell him to stay away from them. Gary then tells Mason to leave, which he does. Liam later witnesses Mason bullying another boy at school.

When the police learn about Mason threatening Liam with the knife, they search both Mason and Dylan's homes, but the searches are unsuccessful as Dylan had hidden the knife in Tyrone's garden. Mason later tells Dylan to meet him at a precinct with the knife. Dylan goes to the precinct and waits for Mason, only to approached by Craig and other police officers, who find the knife in Dylan's possession and arrest him. This makes Dylan realise that Mason set him up. Dylan tells the police about Mason giving him the knife and decides to plead guilty after learning that the bullying nearly caused Liam commit suicide. Mason attempts to visit Dylan at his home, but is sent away by Sean and Eileen Grimshaw (Sue Cleaver). Mason later meets Dylan at Victoria Gardens and is pleased when Dylan speaks of his intentions to plead guilty for possession of the knife. Dylan then reveals that he had told the police about the hit and run Mason did, but Mason stated that the police had to prove he did it. Unbeknownst to the two, their conversion is overheard by Gary, who passes on the information to Sean and Eileen. Maria and Gary are later told by the police that Mason had been charged after his fingerprints were found on the knife and that he could face a custodial sentence if he is found guilty.

In April 2024 on the lead up to his court hearing, Mason has a girl named Bella lure Dylan to him under the claim of wanting to make peace with him. Bella agrees and invites Dylan in meet her for ice cream at the precinct. However, Bella is horrified when Mason along with his friends, confronts Dylan and warns him to retract his statement and pull out of giving evidence at the hearing under the threat of Mason's two older brothers coming after Dylan. At Mason's hearing, both Liam and Dylan make statements. At first, Dylan, after being threatened earlier by one of Mason's friends, denies that Mason had the knife, but is later convinced to be truthful. Mason is declared guilty by the judge in part because of Mason's unwillingness to give a testimony in his defence, but also says that she would not have come to her decision without Liam and Dylan's statements, though the judge delayed his sentencing for a week until she could hear from his youth justice worker, but as this had been Mason's second knife crime offence, the judge warned him that as a matter of law, the only sentence available would be a sentence of imprisonment.

A few months later, upon Mason's release, Stu finds him beaten with a bloody face in the park, and offers him food at Speed Daal after he reveals his brother was responsible for his attack. Once there, Mason is outed by the furious parents for his previous actions. Stu and Yasmeen hear him out but say he must leave, though Stu is conflicted.

Stu later offers him a job at Speed Daal. Again, Dylan and Liam are worried and their parents demand that Yasmeen fires him, but she and Stu come to his defence. Sean Tully posts damning reviews about the restaurant hiring a criminal.

Yasmeen speaks to Stu about what they have done, asking if it's worth it. Stu says that Mason deserves a chance.

Mason apologised to Liam and Dylan. Later on he finds out that Dylan now carries a zombie knife to protect himself. Mason encourages Dylan to throw away his knife by handing it in to the amnesty bin at the local police station.

Betsy Swain, who has been hanging around and flirty with Mason, later frames him for the theft of a purse when he rejects hanging out with her. Dylan [who has become friends with Betsy] finds out what she has done, and despite what Mason put him through, tries to convince her to tell the police the truth – as Mason has been sent back to prison [Juvie] as he was reported by Stu for theft – despite pleading he didn't do it, Stu did not believe him.

Stu eventually realises Mason is telling the truth and apologises. He offers Mason his job back but Mason rejects it. He also rejects Stu's offer for a place to stay with him and Yasmeen. He does not divulge to Stu and Yasmeen where he is now staying. Stu later leaves for Germany. Stu and Yasmeen do not find out that Mason was the one that ran over Eliza in 2023, and the storyline of him doing so is dropped.

Yasmeen is concerned for Mason’s welfare after Stu leaves for Germany. However, she does not wish to have Mason staying in her home as she feels unsafe as a single woman living alone when Mason has history with his criminal brothers. Mason starts sleeping rough because his brothers regularly beat him up when he stays at home. He later takes refuge in Sally and Tim Metcalfe's house after Tim catches him sneaking in to steal food. Tim allows Mason to sleep on the sofa during the day and confesses to Sally after she assumes they are being burgled when she notices spilled food. Sally asks Mason to leave as she doesn't feel safe with him in the house due to his history, but later allows Mason to stay over the Christmas holidays.

In January 2025, Mason helps to find evidence against his brothers Matty and Logan, as DS Lisa Swain (Betsy's mum) thinks they were responsible for her late wife's death during a hit and run. He hands in a war helmet that he thinks may be evidence that puts his brothers at the scene of the crime. Matty and Logan are later released due to lack of evidence and come looking for Mason for grassing them up to the police.

Mason meanwhile has accepted a job offer from Stu in Germany and is preparing to leave. He goes back to the flat he shared with Matty and Logan, assuming they are still in the police station, to retrieve some old photos. Dylan keeps a lookout for him to ensure Matty and Logan don't turn up. However, as Mason and Dylan turn the corner, they realise that Matty and Logan are waiting for him outside at the bottom of the stairs. Mason tries to run from his brothers, by jumping off a balcony. However, Matty and Logan catch up with him and push Dylan over. Matty and Logan scuffle with Mason in the alleyway before Logan stabs Mason in the chest. It's later revealed that the knife was Dylan's zombie knife, and he hadn't got rid of it after all; rather, he'd stored it in a vent in the flat he shares with his father, Sean Tully, and had brought it to protect himself in case Matty and Logan turned up while he was keeping a lookout for Mason. Matty and Logan had pushed Dylan over and Logan had grabbed the knife from him, before giving chase to Mason. Abi Webster finds Mason and tries to help stem the blood. Abi calls the ambulance and anxiously waits for it to arrive, along with Gary Windass, who is also at the scene. While Asha Alahan is on duty, she receives the call that a young boy is in critical condition at Weatherfield precinct. Asha and the other paramedics must first attend a hoax call (from Joseph Brown) before the one about Mason, which means they lose valuable time in getting to him. The ambulance arrives at the precinct; in the back of it, Betsy holds Mason's hand as she and Abi do their best to reassure him that he's going to be okay. Mason is taken to hospital, but he goes into cardiac arrest shortly after arrival, and dies.

Mason appears in February 2025 as a hallucination to Abi who was suffering a breakdown following the death of Mason; and the memories that stirred of the death of her own son, Seb.

== Ange Carlisle ==
Ange Carlisle, played by Nicole Barber-Lane, was the owner of a taxi cab firm who appeared in episodes airing 26 September and 2 October 2023. Her casting was announced on 1 September 2023, and her character was described to be joining for a "multiple episode arc." Barber-Lane also commented on her casting by saying "Such a pleasure to do a little cameo" and "Look out for Ange in the last week of September!" Fans immediately recognised Barber-Lane as she previously played Myra McQueen in Channel 4 soap opera Hollyoaks. She was seen to be a customer at Webster's garage where Kevin Webster (Michael Le Vell) tried to impress her when she asked for her car to be looked at.

== Matty Radcliffe ==
Matty Radcliffe
- Coronation Street character
- Portrayed by: Seamus McGoff
- Duration: 2023–2025
- First appearance: Episode 11085; 16 October 2023
- Last appearance: Episode 11467; 13 January 2025
- Introduced by: Iain MacLeod (2023); Verity MacLeod (2024)
In-universe information
- Brothers: Logan Radcliffe; Mason Radcliffe

Matty Radcliffe, portrayed by Seamus McGoff, is the brother of Mason Radcliffe (Luca Toolan) and Logan Radcliffe (Harry Lowbridge). He first made a guest appearance on 16 October 2023 when he was involved in a situation with Ryan Connor (Ryan Prescott) and Daniel Osbourne (Rob Mallard), however his return was revealed on 5 November 2024, and Matty made his return on 8 November 2024. Lucretia Munro from The Mirror wrote that McGoff "became a talked about character due to his portrayal of the tearaway teenager." Upon his return, he would be involved in a storyline where he would steal from Sally (Sally Dynevor) and Tim Metcalfe (Joe Duttine). Daniel Kilkelly from Digital Spy described Matty's character to be "ruthless".

Toolan, who plays McGoff's on-screen brother, had previously spoken about Mason's past: "I think this is the kind of abuse Mason has faced his whole life which unfortunately is what has shaped him into the kind of person he is today. I think once Mason is fully back on screen, we will see little nuggets of things which we will be able to explore further into his backstory and give a clearer insight into his family life." On 6 January 2025, Matty and Logan brutally attacked then stabbed Mason, which would lead to his death due to a cardiac arrest sustained by the injuries. McGoff made his final appearance on 13 January 2025 and he subsequently announced his departure in an Instagram post saying he had "gone out with a bang."

== Tony Byrne ==
Tony Byrne
- Coronation Street character
- Portrayed by: Sean Cernow
- First appearance: Episode 11,115/6; 20 November 2023
- Last appearance: Episode 11,143/4; 22 December 2023
- Introduced by: Iain MacLeod
In-universe information
- Occupation: Plumber

Tony Byrne, played by Sean Cernow, is a former plumber who first appeared on 20 November 2023 in the house of Ed Bailey (Trevor Michael Georges) and has been described to "be embroiled in a big winter storyline in the coming weeks." Cernow has had two previous minor roles on Coronation Street; however, Tony Byrne has been conveyed to "be his biggest Corrie role to date though in the gripping new storyline with Tony and Ed that will play out in the run-up to Christmas." Manchester Evening News reported that Cernow said "I hope people are really going to like Tony, he's dead sweet and lovely. He has a past though and is an old friend of Ed's. At first he thinks 'brilliant, Ed is helping me to get over the past', but what he doesn't realise is that the saint could actually be the sinner." He also joked and said "Because I always end up playing the bad guys, I've said in the past I'd love a punch up on the cobbles. Viewers will have to wait and see if that happens with Tony."

On 7 December 2023, Digital Spy announced that things were going to get nasty between Ed and Tony around Christmas: "Ed Bailey will be viciously attacked over his unpaid debt to Tony later this month." On Christmas Eve, in which the episode aired on Friday 22 December, Tony forces his way in to the Bailey's house as Ed is about to depart for Birmingham on the train and attacks him as he is not able to pay back the money he owes him. Ed reluctantly takes the presents he has bought his family for Christmas, including a wendy house for his granddaughter Glory (Eleanor Beckles), to a pawn shop after Tony guilt tripped him by saying he would not be able to buy his own family Christmas presents.

== Sarge Bailey ==
Sarge Bailey
- Coronation Street character
- Portrayed by: Ram John Holder
- Duration: 2023–2024
- First appearance: Episode 11121/2; 27 November 2023
- Last appearance: Episode 11,156/5; 5 January 2024
- Introduced by: Iain MacLeod
In-universe information
- Sons: Ed Bailey; Ronnie Bailey
- Grandsons: Michael Bailey; James Bailey
- Granddaughters: Dee Dee Bailey
- Other relatives: Glory Bailey; Laila Bailey

Ernest "Sarge" Bailey, played by Ram John Holder, is the father of established characters Ed (Trevor Michael Georges) and Ronnie Bailey (Vinta Morgan), and has been described as a "substantial" guest role. John Holder's casting was announced on 29 September 2023. A spokesperson told Radio Times: "Ram has already been filming his scenes in Weatherfield, though viewers won't get to see them for some months." They continued: "It's a substantial role for him to have been cast in, though it will come as second nature [as] he's a seasoned star of multiple dramas – including soaps."

Holder made his first appearance as Sarge Bailey on 27 November 2023, when he came to visit Ed and the family. At the dinner table, when playing dominoes, he made snarky remarks about Ed's gambling addiction; unbeknownst to him or anyone else in the family, Ed was currently struggling with it again. Dee Dee Bailey (Channique Sterling-Brown) quickly stepped in to defend him. After spending Christmas with his family, he departed on 5 January 2024.

== Bobby Crawford ==
Bobby Crawford
- Coronation Street character
- Portrayed by: Jack Carroll
- Duration: 2023–2025
- First appearance: Episode 11147/8; 27 December 2023
- Last appearance: Episode 11567/8; 12 May 2025
- Introduced by: Iain MacLeod
In-universe information
- Occupation: Factory Worker
- Father: Rob Donovan
- Half-sisters: Connie Waring
- Grandmothers: Sharon Donovan
- Aunts: Carla Connor

Bobby Crawford, played by Jack Carroll, made his first appearance on 27 December. He's the estranged son of established character Rob Donovan (Marc Baylis) and nephew of Carla Connor (Alison King). Carroll's casting was announced on 22 October 2023. Speaking about his casting, Carroll expressed his excitement when he began filming, "I'm delighted and honoured to be playing a part in the history of the cultural institution that is Coronation Street. I hope Bobby brings viewers a lot of laughs in the vein of some of the street's classic comedy characters."

He turns up out of the blue shortly after Christmas, and Carla will be shocked to find out she has a new family member. Bobby's dad Rob is currently serving a life sentence in prison for the murder of Tina McIntyre (Michelle Keegan) and only recently found out he has a son, leaving eldest sister Carla in the dark. Described as "a livewire chip off the old block, with the gift of the gab and an eye for the ladies," Bobby is sure to ruffle some feathers in Weatherfield as he plans on sticking around longer than his Aunt Carla intends.

== Moses Ekundayo ==
Moses Ekundayo
- Coronation Street character
- Portrayed by: Mitchael Fatogun
- Duration: 2023–2024
- First appearance: Episode 11147/8; 27 December 2023
- Last appearance: Episode 11,172/13; 24 January 2024
- Introduced by: Iain MacLeod
In-universe information
- Occupation: Care assistant

Moses Ekundayo is the new assistant for Paul Foreman (Peter Ash). Moses was also introduced as a new love interest for Todd Grimshaw (Gareth Pierce) and is played by Michael Fatogan, whose casting was announced on 15 December 2023. Moses made his first appearance on 27 December and appeared again on 29 December, but began to appear more frequently throughout January 2024. He departed on 24 January 2024 when he moved to London to start a new job. Producer Iain MacLeod told Digital Spy: "There's a dalliance for Todd, but it arrives at quite a poor time. And the person with whom he has the connection is probably not ideal in terms of the situation that Todd meets them in. At this time, it's only a little test drive of his relationship with this person. It's not very long running, but we thought that if we like what we see, it might go on to be long-running later on."

On 16 September 2024, eight months after Moses' departure, Digital Spy revealed that Pierce who plays Todd, discussed the potential of Moses making a return after it had been previously teased by former executive producer, Iain Macleod. Pierce discussed the door being left open for Fatogan to return: "They've said that. Michael Fatogun, who played Moses, is a fantastic actor. We tried to instil as much spark as we could in that short-ish time that the characters were together. What Iain said is that it's got potential for Moses to maybe feel like the one that got away." He continued: "So whether that does swoop back around at some point, I think there's definitely a sense that we want to play a relationship story with Todd at some point in the near future. There have been references to the fact that he's getting on now. Todd is going to be 40 in January next year, so there's been the odd reference to 'still living at home, nearly 40'. I'm definitely interested in what's next for Todd and I'm assured that there's stuff to come."

== Other characters ==
Character	Episode date(s)	Actor	Circumstances
Angelique Simmons	3 March – 28 August	Lauren Carse	A representative of the American distribution company Nippersnapper who appears alongside Owen Longford (Ben Hull).
Mia Penrose	10–12 May	May Daley	The on-off girlfriend of Aaron Sandford (James Craven). Mia and Aaron previously dated prior to Aaron starting a relationship with Summer Spellman (Harriet Bibby). Aaron gets back in touch with Mia and the pair stay up late into the night talking, which is overheard by his flatmate Amy Barlow (Elle Mulvaney). Summer discovers that the pair were talking and is unhappy to learn that Aaron had discussed their personal problems with Mia. Aaron and Summer argue, during which he gets drunk and flirts with Amy. Amy is initially receptive to the sexual advances, but falls unconscious and whilst unable to further consent, Aaron rapes her. Amy comes forward and accuses Aaron of rape and attempts to warn Mia through social media. However, Mia sides with Aaron and blocks Amy's contact, later reporting Amy to the police for harassment.
Yvette Leighton	5–12 June	Arabella Weir	An old neighbor of Ed Bailey (Trevor Michael Georges) and Aggie Bailey (Lorna Laidlaw).
Gerry Northrop	3 July – 14 August	Graham Turner	A Tai Chi instructor who strikes up a friendship with Elaine Jones (Paula Wilcox).
Isla Gibbs	13 November – 6 December	Emily Dowson	Isla is Asha Alahan (Tanisha Gorey) Work friend and they have been spending lots of time with each other. Nina Lucas (Mollie Gallagher) is concerned that they are spending too much time with each other. Isla goes to Asha's house and tells her about her feelings for her and they both decide that they stop spending time with each other.
Dan Morris	18–20 November	George Martin	A man who Amy Barlow (Elle Mulvaney) sees trying to spike a woman in a nightclub. She warns the woman off, and instead switches drinks with the man and spikes him. She meets up with Aadi Alahan (Adam Hussain), who advises her to take him to the hospital, which she wasn't originally going to do.
Terry Fensley	6 December – 10 January 2024	James Foster	Terry is a man who is caught by Evelyn Plummer (Maureen Lipman) abusing his dog and later on she breaks into his van and steals the dog.
