= Candy Cabs =

2011 British TV series

- Written by: Johanne McAndrew; Elliott Hope
- Directed by: Minkie Spiro
- Starring: Jo Joyner; Lisa Millett; Paul Nicholls; Melanie Hill; Jodie Prenger; Claire Sweeney; Denis Lawson
- Country of origin: United Kingdom
- Original language: English
- No. of series: 1
- No. of episodes: 3

Production
- Production locations: Lymm in Cheshire; West Kirby
- Running time: 60 minutes per episode
- Production company: Splash Media

Original release
- Network: BBC One
- Release: 5 April – 19 April 2011

Candy Cabs is a comedy drama series shown on BBC One in April 2011. The plot revolves around a group of friends who set up a female-only taxi company in a seaside town in Northern England. It was written by Johanne McAndrew and Elliott Hope and produced by Splash Media. The series was axed immediately after the first series aired.

== Cast ==
Claire Sweeney, Jodie Prenger, Jo Joyner, Lisa Millett and Melanie Hill play the group of friends with Denis Lawson playing the part of a competitor who schemes against the taxi company set up by the group of friends. Other characters are played by Lu Corfield, Paul Nicholls, John Henshaw, Paul Kaye, Tom Goodman-Hill, Daniel Ryan, Jamie Davis and Ricky Whittle.

== Plot ==
Episode 1 opens with the funeral of 'Shazza', friend of Jackie (Jo Joyner) and Elaine (Lisa Millet). Before Shazza's death, the trio had been planning to start up their all female taxi firm and, determined by their friend's death, the pair decide to continue. The next day, Elaine is seen in a car company office alone awaiting for Jackie to arrive. Behind her the six brightly coloured pink cabs arrive on the back of a truck and the female cab drivers are seen getting very over-excited about it. Jackie, meanwhile, is confronting her ex-husband after the discovery that he is already dating another woman who she nicknames Mrs. Doubtfire. As Jackie finally arrives, she signs the deeds for the cars and a montage of the cars driving through the sea-side village takes place.
Back at the taxi firm, Elaine starts freaking out. It becomes apparent to start up the cab company, Elaine re-mortgaged her house – without telling her husband. Jackie takes her friend into a back room away from the other girls and it takes a lot of calm words and her 'trusty five fingered friend' which is basically a yellow washing up glove that Elaine uses to breathe into much like others may use a paper bag. The girls are then told by Tony (Paul Nicholls) to be a formal cab company, that they must attend a driving exam.

Episode 2 opens as business picking up following Jackie and Elaine's television appearance and they are thrilled when footballer Eddie Shannon books Candy Cabs to provide the transport for his high-profile wedding at the local stadium. The dastardly Dennis slyly tries to wangle his way back into Witney's good books when she is left out of the wedding excitement. Meanwhile, over at Kenny Ho's rival cab firm, the male drivers are up in arms, threatened by the female competition. The plotting against Jackie and Elaine gathers pace when the troublemakers start causing mischief among South Hadley's movers and shakers. Things come to a head when Kenny turns up at Elaine's house with an extraordinary offer. Later, wedding madness ensues when bride-to-be Kendra goes missing following the hen night. Candy Cabs find themselves at the centre of a wedding attended by 10,000 football supporters which looks set to become a PR disaster. Elsewhere, Dave's sister Diane is on the warpath after being sacked as a driver, while Alex's infatuation with his sister-in-law, Elaine, crosses the line. Despite all the mayhem, Jackie's romance with Tony is blossoming – until Sally Ann makes a disturbing discovery. There also seems to be a story behind the unexpected package that lands on Tony's doorstep.

Episode 3 opens Jackie and Elaine go on a spying mission and are shocked when they discover Tony's little secret. There is no time to dwell on what they have found, however, as they head to an employment tribunal where they face a charge of discrimination against men. Though they have no proof, they suspect that rival cabbie operator, Kenny Ho, is behind the accusations – which could spell the end for the all-girl Candy Cabs. Still desperately trying to drum up business, they think they have hit upon a winner when they get a trial run with Girls on the Go, an all-female Seniors' Club. However, in true Candy fashion, nothing goes to plan when an outing to a garden centre with the feisty old ladies lands them in some very deep water. Meanwhile, Elaine begs Jackie to keep Tony on site until the dreaded discrimination tribunal but, still in bits over what she has discovered, Jackie cannot stop herself confronting him. To add to their worries, Witney tells them she is about to go to Spain with her dad, leaving them to question whether Dennis has finally decided to become a decent father – or whether he has more dastardly plans up his sleeve. On the day of the tribunal, Jackie decides that desperate times call for desperate measures – much to Elaine's horror. Kenny also has a few surprises of his own.

== Episodes ==
The first series consisted of three episodes with the first episode broadcast on 5 April and last on 19 April 2011.

No.	Title	Written by	Original release date	Viewers (millions)
1	"Episode One"	Johanne McAndrew & Elliott Hope	5 April 2011	6.17
2	"Episode Two"	Johanne McAndrew & Elliott Hope	12 April 2011	4.3
3	"Episode Three"	Johanne McAndrew & Elliott Hope	19 April 2011	3.6

== Broadcast and reception ==
The three-part comedy drama, written by Elliott Hope and Johanne McAndrew, aired in April on BBC One. Although it launched well with 6.7 million viewers the following two episodes saw big drops in rating levels. It received generally poor reviews from critics, with many complaining that the series appeared to be plagiarised from the 1963 British Carry On film Carry On Cabby.

In June 2011 the BBC announced that they had decided not to commission Candy Cabs for a second series.
