= Calum Lill =

English actor (born 1990s)

- Born: 1995 or 1996 (age 30–31)
- Occupations: Actor; Car salesman
- Years active: 2019–present
- Television: Coronation Street
- Partner: Roberta McClarron (2021–)

Calum Lill (born 1995 or 1996) is a British actor. After graduating, Lill had guest roles in Doctors and Holby City in 2019, and he played the recurring role of Carlton Smith in the soap opera Hollyoaks in 2021. Lill almost quit the acting profession due to his struggle in getting acting roles and worked various jobs in between acting, including as a car salesman, which he did not like. Lill was later cast as Joel Deering in the ITV soap opera Coronation Street, which he was very happy about. Lill enjoyed his experience on the soap and received praise for his portrayal of the villain and was nominated for Inside Soap Awards and a British Soap Award. Lill left the role at the end of the storyline in 2024 and he then portrayed Fleshcreep in the pantomime of Jack and the Beanstalk. In 2025, Lill announced that he would be acting in The Sociable Plover at the Old Red Lion, Islington, and that same year it was also announced that he would be briefly returning to Coronation Street.

== Early life and career ==
=== Early life and career ===
Calum Lill was born into a working-class family, in 1995 or 1996. When he was a child, he watched the drama Waterloo Road, which he considered his favourite show. He revealed, "All I wanted to do was get an acting job in Waterloo Road when I was growing up". Lill also revealed that his house was used as one of the sets during the early years of Waterloo Road just as his family were moving out from it.

Shortly after he graduated, Lill portrayed lead guest character Chez Wilson-Needham in an episode of the BBC soap opera Doctors, which aired in 2019. Speaking of the experience, Lill said, "it was two days filming and you'd think I'd just been cast as the lead in the new Scorsese epic". He also portrayed Conor Henson in a 2019 episode of Holby City, which Lill described as "fantastic". The COVID-19 lockdown in the United Kingdom then occurred, which hindered Lill's plans. Due to the television industry shutting down, Lill nearly became homeless during the pandemic. Lill recalled to the Me, Myself and Hopefully You..? podcast in 2021, "It's a hustle. That's what a lot of theatre actors struggle with. They love theatre, but it only pays enough to cover your rent while in you're in the job... You've then got to go back to waiting tables". In 2021, he portrayed the recurring role of Carlton Smith in the soap opera Hollyoaks for 12 episodes.

In between acting roles, Lill had various jobs, including a stint working at Junkyard Golf Club. Lill moved from London to Manchester with his girlfriend and worked alongside acting to save money for a house. Lill found this experience very difficult and was not happy in the non-acting job that he was doing, and he almost quit his acting career. At one point, Lill auditioned for the soap opera Coronation Street but was unsuccessful, which made him upset as he wanted to be on the soap due to being working-class and Northern. Lill then worked at a paella stand at festivals where he met actors Rupert Hill, the brother of the owner of the stand, and his wife Jenny Platt, both of whom had appeared in the soap. The actors reassured him that the producers of Coronation Street would contact him if they liked him. Whilst auditioning for the soap, he worked as a car salesman, which he hated.

=== Since 2023 ===
In August 2023, it was announced that Lill had joined the cast of Coronation Street as Joel Deering, a solicitor who would become the new love interest for Dee Dee Bailey (Channique Sterling-Brown). Lill described being cast in the soap as "incredible", adding, "I've never felt anything like it. I was walking on air...especially being a working class northern lad". He added, "It was a relief that 14 or 15 years had paid off and I wouldn't have to quit. There's no shame in quitting... But to know I didn't have to was incredible". He auditioned for the role in May 2023 initially believed that he had been unsuccessful. When Lill's agent told him that he had received the part, he fell to his knees and cried and could not speak as he was "over the moon". The actor called getting a regular role on the soap the equivalent of getting his "letter for Hogwarts". Lill revealed that Coronation Street spent a lot of money on the character's outfits. Lill would wake up at 5:30am to read the scripts and arrive to work for 7am and stay until about 8–9pm.

"When you're doing 40 pages a day then you finish and need to learn 40 pages for the next few days, it's so relentless... it's such a skill, a baptism by fire. That was the most challenging. Everyone says you'll leave a different actor then when you started, because you can't not learn and develop so fast from the sheer volume of work."

— Lill on working on Coronation Street (2024)

Joel was initially portrayed as a "good guy" but was later revealed to be a villain who was grooming and abusing girls and had tried to murder Lauren Bolton (Cait Fitton), who had been presumed dead for months. Lill had known that Joel was going to be a villain and found out just how "bad" Joel was as he got further into auditions, and he was initially unaware of how the plot would end as it "kept changing". Lill enjoyed portraying Joel's villainous side, as he found it more fun, but did not "camp it up" due to the storyline being a serious matter. He was also uncomfortable with portraying some of the things that the character did due to it being so dark, but the crew supported him with it. Lill researched for the role by watching hours of police interviews with serial killer Ted Bundy and speaking to the Maggie Oliver Foundation, a charity that supports survivors of sexual exploitation and abuse. The actor would listen to music to get into character, ranging from sad, melancholy and drum and bass, but he noted that he could no longer listen to that music for pleasure as it would remind him of Joel. Lill joked that several viewers had recognised him in public but did not speak to him as he plays a villain, but he believed that he had created "some sort of separation" between him and the character due to being active on social media. Lill expected to receive a negative backlash but found most of the response to be supportive. He added that he only began to get noticed by viewers when Joel was revealed to be involved with Lauren. Fitton and Lill got on well together and went the "extra mile" to make their scenes believable by distancing from each other on set and being in character when they passed each other. Lill found an episode that was mostly him and Fitton to be the most challenging part of his time on the soap, but they felt "privileged" to be "trusted" with it. In order to protect the secret from viewers that Lauren was alive, Lill would hide Fitton in the boot of his car when entering the set gates in order to sneak her into the building. Lill joked on Instagram that he struggled to act with the child actress who played Joel's daughter Maeve Wilkinson as he died "of cuteness overload every take". However, Lill also revealed that criticise himself when he would watch his scenes in episodes but added, "I worked so hard. I know that there's definitely better actors than me but I don't think anybody else could have put in as much work as I did. Because I just said, if I can give this 100% and I leave and I don't work for years, at least I know that there's no more I could have done".

In July 2024, it was announced that Lill had been cast as the villain Fleshcreep in Bournemouth Pavilion's pantomime of Jack and the Beanstalk, which ran from December 2024 to January 2025. Lill joked that he had a "streak" of playing villains. He added that he was looking forward to doing comedy. Lill's casting in the production sparked rumours that Lill would be exiting Coronation Street due to ITV usually not allowing actors to star in pantomimes while they are contracted, though it was reported that Lill had always meant to have a finite run on the soap. His departure was confirmed the following month. The character was killed-off in a Whodunit mystery storyline in September 2024, and the killer was revealed to be Lauren that November in a flashback episode. Lill he did not want to leave the soap as he had made some good friends there, calling it "the most incredible place to work" and "the best year" of his life. The ending changed several times, which kept Lill on his "toes". Lill had left the show in July 2024 but returned to film the flashback episode. Lill revealed that when he left the soap, he took several of the character's outfits, including his "smart casual stuff" which he considered "nicer" than any of his own smart outfits, with permission. He also took home the "soft foam" prop of the brick that was used to kill Joel. Lill's co-stars got him several leaving presents, including a St Christopher's pendant. Lill said that leaving his colleagues would be the most difficult thing of leaving the soap as he believed that they were the "just the best in the world".

For his role as Joel, Lill was shortlisted for "Best Villain" at the 2024 Inside Soap Awards, whilst Joel being revealed as Lauren's mystery boyfriend was shortlisted for "Best Showstopper" and Lauren's disappearance was longlisted for "Best Storyline". In 2025, Lill was longlisted for Villain of the Year at the British Soap Awards. He made the shortlist. Gary Brocart-Gillatt from Inside Soap wrote that he enjoyed the "camp touches" that Lill brought to his villainous character. Lill spoke to James Chase, who plays Tom King in another soap opera Emmerdale, at an awards ceremony as they both related to playing villains in soap operas and received hate messages online. In November 2024, Lill appeared on Good Morning Britain, where promoted the details of an ITV competition to viewers. In April 2025, Lill announced that he would be acting in Tim Whitnall's play The Sociable Plover at the Old Red Lion, Islington from 13–24 May that year. That same month, it was reported that Lill would briefly reprise his role of Joel on Coronation Street in an unknown storyline. In October 2025, it was announced that Lill would be a celebrity judge on Worksop's Got Talent.

== Personal life ==
Lill has dated Roberta McClarron, who works in public relations and marketing, since December 2021. When he was cast on Coronation Street, he lived with his girlfriend and his brother, who knew about Joel turning out to be a villain. Lill said that McClarron was very happy for him when he was cast on Coronation Street as she knew how much he was struggling emotionally due to his struggles in getting acting jobs. McClaron got on well with Sterling-Brown; they had a group chat with McClaron's friend called "The Girls Featuring Calum". In June 2024, the couple announced their engagement. That September, Lill paid tribute to McClarron on Instagram, where he thanked her for supporting him and his acting career and noted that he had not seen her much during his time on Coronation Street but she still supported him and did the housework so that Lill could put the soap first, with Lill writing, "I'm so grateful to have you in my life and that you agreed to marry me. Thanks for being amazing". Lill said in 2024 that he was friends with actor Tyler Dobbs, who also portrayed a villain in Coronation Street. In May 2024, Lill took part in the AJ Bell Great Manchester Run with other Coronation Street actors to raise money for charity. Lill filmed a video of his grandmother reacting to Joel being revealed as a villain, which became popular with Coronation Street viewers; Lill attributed this to viewers seeing him as "Calum the actor" rather than his character. In the first half of 2025, Lill travelled around Southeast Asia.

== Acting credits ==
=== Filmography ===
| Year | Title | Role | Notes | Ref. |
|---|---|---|---|---|
| 2019 | Doctors | Chez Wilson-Needham | Lead guest role (1 episode) | |
| 2019 | Holby City | Conor Henson | Guest role (1 episode) | |
| 2021 | Hollyoaks | Carlton Smith | Recurring role (12 episodes) | |
| 2023–25 | Coronation Street | Joel Deering | Regular role | |

=== Theatre ===
| Year | Production | Venue | Role | Ref. |
|---|---|---|---|---|
| 2024–25 | Jack and the Beanstalk | Bournemouth Pavilion | Fleshcreep | |
| 2025 | The Sociable Plover | Old Red Lion, Islington | —N/a | |

== Awards and nominations ==
List of acting awards and nominations
| Year | Award | Category | Title | Result | Ref. |
|---|---|---|---|---|---|
| 2024 | Inside Soap Awards | Best Villain | Coronation Street | Shortlisted | |
| 2024 | Inside Soap Awards | Best Showstopper | Coronation Street | Shortlisted | |
| 2025 | British Soap Awards | Villain of the Year | Coronation Street | Shortlisted | |
