= Claire (album) =

Studio album by Claire Sweeney
- Released: 10 March 2002
- Recorded: 2001
- Genre: Pop
- Length: 61:00
- Label: Telstar

Claire is the first and only studio album by English actress and singer Claire Sweeney, released by Telstar Records in 2002. It reached number 15 on the UK Albums Chart.

== Track listing ==
No.	Title	Writer(s)	Length
1.	"When You Believe"	Wendy Page, Jim Marr	3:50
2.	"I Hope You Dance"	Mark D. Sanders, Tia Sillers	4:10
3.	"Too Much Love Will Kill You"	Brian May, Frank Musker, Elizabeth Lamers	4:26
4.	"The Look of Love"	Burt Bacharach, Hal David	4:32
5.	"Light My Fire"	Jim Morrison, Robby Krieger, John Densmore, Ray Manzarek	3:57
6.	"Run to Me"	Barry Gibb, Robin Gibb, Maurice Gibb	4:57
7.	"My Heart Will Go On"	James Horner, Will Jennings	5:01
8.	"Someday I'll Find You"	Noël Coward	3:51
9.	"My Baby Loves Me"	Gretchen Peters	2:39
10.	"One Day I'll Fly Away"	Joe Sample, Will Jennings	4:52
11.	"Something in Red"	Angela Kaset	4:08
12.	"This Girl's in Love with You"	Burt Bacharach, Hal David	4:08
13.	"What If"	Steve Mac, Wayne Hector	4:08
14.	"Evergreen"	Barbra Streisand, Paul Williams	3:41
15.	"Scarborough Fair"	Paul Simon	3:14

== Charts ==
Chart	Position
UK Albums Chart	15
