= Claire Sweeney =

English actress, singer and television personality (born 1971)

- Sweeney in 2019
- Born: Claire Jayne Sweeney; 17 April 1971 (age 55); Walton, Liverpool, England
- Education: Italia Conti Academy of Theatre Arts
- Occupations: Actress; singer; dancer; broadcaster
- Years active: 1987–present
- Children: 1

Claire Jayne Sweeney (born 17 April 1971) is an English actress, singer, and television personality. Known for her portrayal of Lindsey Corkhill on Channel 4's Brookside (1991–1992, 1995–2003), she also played Roxie Hart in Chicago (West End, 2001–2002) and starred in touring productions of Guys and Dolls (2006), Tell Me on a Sunday (2011), Legally Blonde (2011), and Educating Rita (2012). She was a panellist on ITV's Loose Women between 2003 and 2005, and presented 60 Minute Makeover from 2004 to 2006. Her debut album, Claire, reached number 15 on the UK Albums Chart in 2002. Sweeney has also portrayed Cassie Plummer on the ITV soap opera Coronation Street from 2023 to 2026. Her other credits include Candy Cabs (2011), Scarborough (2019), and The Good Ship Murder (2023–2024).

Sweeney has appeared as a contestant on various reality television shows. She was a housemate on the first series of Celebrity Big Brother (2001), competed on the first series of Strictly Come Dancing (2004), appeared on the sixteenth series of Dancing on Ice (2024), and is on the twenty-sixth series of I'm a Celebrity...Get Me Out of Here! (2026).

== Early life ==
Sweeney was born in Walton, Liverpool, the daughter of a butcher who had a shop in Toxteth. She trained at the Elliott-Clarke Theatre School in Liverpool, and worked at weekends in her father's shop.

Her first singing engagement was at the age of 14 in the Montrose Club in Liverpool, for which she was paid £25. She was then educated full-time at the Italia Conti Academy of Theatre Arts in London. In 1987, she was a member of the Southport Summer Youth Theatre Workshop's production of the musical Hair.

== Career ==
Sweeney's first major role was as Lindsey Corkhill in the soap opera Brookside, initially as a recurring character from 1991 and then as a leading character from 1995 until the programme ended in 2003. In 2001, Sweeney appeared in the first series of Celebrity Big Brother and Lily Savage's Blankety Blank, and presented ITV's Challenge of a Lifetime. She was also cast as Roxie Hart in the London revival of the musical Chicago. In the same year she became a brand promoter for Marks & Spencer, and a brand ambassador for Fashion World and SlimFast.

In 2002, Sweeney became a forces sweetheart and entertained British Army troops serving in Afghanistan. In the same year she released the album Claire, featuring a mix of original material and cover versions: it peaked at number 15 in the UK Albums Chart in July 2002. She also co-presented BBC One's A Song for Europe with Christopher Price. In 2003, Sweeney starred in the world tour of the musical revue Fosse, and featured on the album Give Me a Smile by Carl Davis and the BBC Concert Orchestra.

She was a regular panellist on the ITV's Loose Women from 2003 to 2005, and has appeared as a guest panellist several times since then. In 2004, Sweeney appeared as a contestant on series one of Strictly Come Dancing, being eliminated in week five. From 2004 to 2006, Sweeney presented the ITV daytime show 60 Minute Makeover. In 2005, Sweeney presented series four of the Living TV show I'm Famous and Frightened!. She also hosted BBC One's Here Comes the Sun In May 2005, she was among the performers who took part in A Party to Remember event commemorating the 60th anniversary of VE Day.

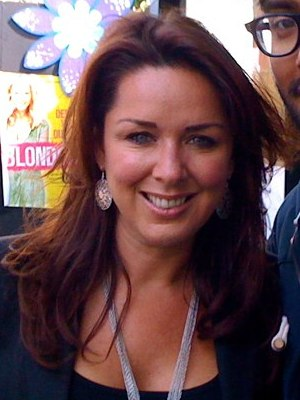
Sweeney in 2009

In 2005 and 2006, Sweeney appeared in pantomime productions of Snow White and Aladdin at the Theatre Royal, Nottingham. In July 2006, She took on the role of Miss Adelaide in the British production of Guys and Dolls at the Piccadilly Theatre in London's West End for an eight-week run, before touring the UK alongside Patrick Swayze in the same production. In 2008, she appeared in the ITV documentary Claire Sweeney's Big Fat Diet, in which she gained 2 stone (13 kg) in six weeks as part of a medical experiment. In 2010, she sang with Carl Davis and the Liverpool Philharmonic Orchestra in the Battle of Britain 70th Anniversary concert.

In 2011, Sweeney played both "The Girl" in a national tour of Andrew Lloyd Webber's musical Tell Me on a Sunday and Paulette in the first UK tour of Legally Blonde: The Musical. She also starred as Amanda in the BBC sitcom Candy Cabs. In 2012, Sweeney appeared in the UK tour of Educating Rita. In 2013, Sweeney appeared in Let's Dance for Comic Relief alongside Natalie Cassidy, Dean Gaffney and Ricky Groves, performing to "You Can't Stop the Beat" from Hairspray. They came second to Antony Cotton. In May and June 2014, she appeared in the comedy musical Sex and the Suburbs, co-written by Sweeney and Mandy Muden, at the Royal Court Theatre, Liverpool. In 2015, Sweeney began presenting her own series, Magic of the Musicals on Magic Radio.

In 2015 and 2016, Sweeney played Velma Von-Tussle in the UK tour of Hairspray. In 2019, Sweeney took part in a special episode of Radio 2's Friday Night Is Music Night to celebrate Tony Hatch's 80th birthday. She starred as Hayley in the BBC sitcom Scarborough, alongside Jason Manford, Stephanie Cole, and Catherine Tyldesley. On Christmas Day 2019 she presented a biography of Cilla Black on Radio 2. In July 2021, Sweeney performed at G-A-Y alongside drag queen Veronica Green as part of the regular cabaret night “Defying Musicals”. Sweeney provided 'alternative Scouse commentary' for the Eurovision Song Contest 2023 final in Liverpool, alongside a member of the public chosen via BBC Radio Merseyside's "Voice of Eurovision" talent search campaign, who was revealed on 1 May 2023 to be Paul Quinn.

In April 2023, it was announced that Sweeney would be joining the cast of Coronation Street as Cassandra Plummer, the daughter of Evelyn Plummer and the biological mother of Tyrone Dobbs. In 2024, Sweeney appeared as a contestant on the sixteenth series of Dancing on Ice. She was paired with Colin Grafton and was third to be eliminated.

In 2026, Sweeney took part in the 26th series of 'Im A Celebrity Get Me Out Of Here!'

== Charitable work ==
Sweeney supports Claire House Children's Hospice, and is a patron of Queenie's Christmas Charity and the Children's Liver Disease Foundation.

== Personal life ==
Sweeney had a relationship with businessman Billy Oakes for six years, until 2007. She has a son, born in 2014 with her ex-partner Daniel Reilly. Sweeney had a publicised friendship with boxer Ricky Hatton in 2024; both were competitors on Dancing on Ice. Hatton died in 2025.

== Acting credits ==
=== Television ===
Year	Title	Role	Notes
1987	Brookside	Paula	1 Episode
1991–1992, 1995–2003	Brookside	Lindsey Corkhill	1,623 episodes
2003	Clocking Off	Katrina Wilkes	Episode: "Colin's Story"
2004	Merseybeat	DS Roz Kelly	2 episodes
2009	The All Star Impressions Show	Various	TV Special
2011	Candy Cabs	Amanda	All 3 episodes
2012	Lemon La Vida Loca	Claire Sweeney	Episode: "Christmas Special: Merry Keithmas - Part Two"
2014	Holby City	Lindsey Kendal	Episode: "Collateral"
2018	Benidorm	Maxine	Episode: #10.9
2019	Doctors	Tracey Sanders	Episode: "Flawsome"
2019	Scarborough	Hayley Cox	3 episodes
2023–2024	The Good Ship Murder	Beverley Carnell	9 episodes
2023–2026	Coronation Street	Cassandra Plummer	Series regular
2026	I'm a Celebrity...Get Me Out of Here!	Herself/contestant	Series 26

=== Theatre credits ===
Year	Title	Role	Venue
2001–2002	Chicago	Roxie Hart	West End, London
2003	Fosse	Lead	World tour
2006	Guys and Dolls	Miss Adelaide	West End, London, then UK Tour
2008	Shout! The Mod Musical	Ruby	UK Tour
2011	Tell Me on a Sunday	The Girl	UK Tour
2011	Legally Blonde: The Musical	Paulette	UK Tour
2012	Educating Rita	Rita	UK Tour
2012–2013	White Christmas	Betty Haynes	The Lowry, Manchester
2013	September in the Rain	Liz	UK Tour
2014–2015	Sex and the Suburbs	Willow Wallace	Royal Court Theatre, Liverpool, then UK Tour
2015–2016	Hairspray	Velma Von Tussle	UK Tour
2016–2017	Chitty Chitty Bang Bang	Baroness Bomburst	UK and Ireland Tour
2018	Crazy for You	Irene Roth	UK Tour
2019	Is There Anybody There?	Joy	New Adelphi Theatre, Salford
2020	Shirley Valentine	Shirley	UK Tour
2022	9 to 5	Violet Newstead	UK Tour
2026	Annie	Miss Hannigan	UK and Ireland Tour

== Discography ==
- Claire (2002)

== Awards and nominations ==
Year	Award	Category	Work	Result	Ref
1996	National Television Awards	Most Popular Actress	Brookside	Nominated	
1999	British Soap Awards	Villain of the Year	Brookside	Longlisted	
1999	British Soap Awards	Sexiest Female	Brookside	Longlisted	
2022	Rainbow Honours	Celebrity Ally of the Year	Herself	Won	
2024	TV Times Awards	Favourite Supporting Actor (Drama)	The Good Ship	Nominated	
2025	Inside Soap Awards	Best Villain	Coronation Street	Longlisted	
