= Jamie Cho =

English actor and director

Jamie Cho is an English actor and director. His work includes Batman Begins (2005), The Dark Knight (2008), Acquitted (2015) and Doctor Who (2023).

== Early life ==
Cho was born in London, U.K. to an English-Irish mother and Chinese father. He grew up in Surrey, attending Glyn Boys School and studied Sports Science & Psychology at Southampton University.

He began training Kung Fu at age 6, learning from his father who ran martial arts schools in London. Inspired by the amazing films of Bruce Lee, Jackie Chan and Donnie Yen, martial arts became a life long passion for him, even traveling to China to study different styles and further his skills.

== Career ==
After graduating university, Cho followed his lifelong passion and embarked on a career in film and TV. Initially working in commercials using martial arts skills learned from his father. He subsequently trained as an actor at the Ivana Chubbuck Studio in Los Angeles. His work includes - “Batman Begins”, “The Dark Knight”, “Eastenders”, ”Acquitted” and Doctor Who.

== Writing and directing ==
In 2013, Cho co-founded the production company Sentient Films, which has produced factual and brand content for television and online channels. In 2015 the company produced the TV show “Ching’s Amazing Asia”, which Cho produced and directed. He is currently in development with his first feature film screenplay.

== Filmography ==
=== Film ===
| Year | Title | Role | Notes |
|---|---|---|---|
| 2001 | Pure Vengeance | Henchman | Short |
| 2002 | Die Another Day | Guard | |
| 2003 | The Purifiers | Raz | |
| 2005 | Batman Begins | Stocky | |
| 2007 | Epidemic | Alex | Short. Also writer, director |
| 2007 | Intergalactic Combat | Tray | |
| 2008 | New Town Killers | Manga Man | |
| 2009 | I Am Digital | The Assassin | Short |
| 2011 | 1 Hour | Harper | Short. Also writer, director |
| 2013 | Harrigan | Lau | |
| 2025 | Christmas Karma | Sebastian | |

=== Television ===
| Year | Title | Role | Notes |
|---|---|---|---|
| 2003 | Beat the Cyborgs | Plex | |
| 2005 | Eastenders | Aikido Instructor | |
| 2010 | Spirit Warriors | Bonobo | |
| 2010 | Law & Order: UK | Father Lee Young | |
| 2012 | Hit & Miss | Lee | |
| 2015 | Acquitted | Degang | |
| 2016 | Ching's Amazing Asia | n/a | Director/Producer |
| 2020 | Bulletproof | Barman | |
| 2023 | Doctor Who | Colonel Chan | |
| 2024 | Coronation Street | Rich Pemberton | |
| 2025 | Sandokan | Haji | |
| 2025 | Bridgerton | Lord Stotter | |
