= Elle Mulvaney =

English actress

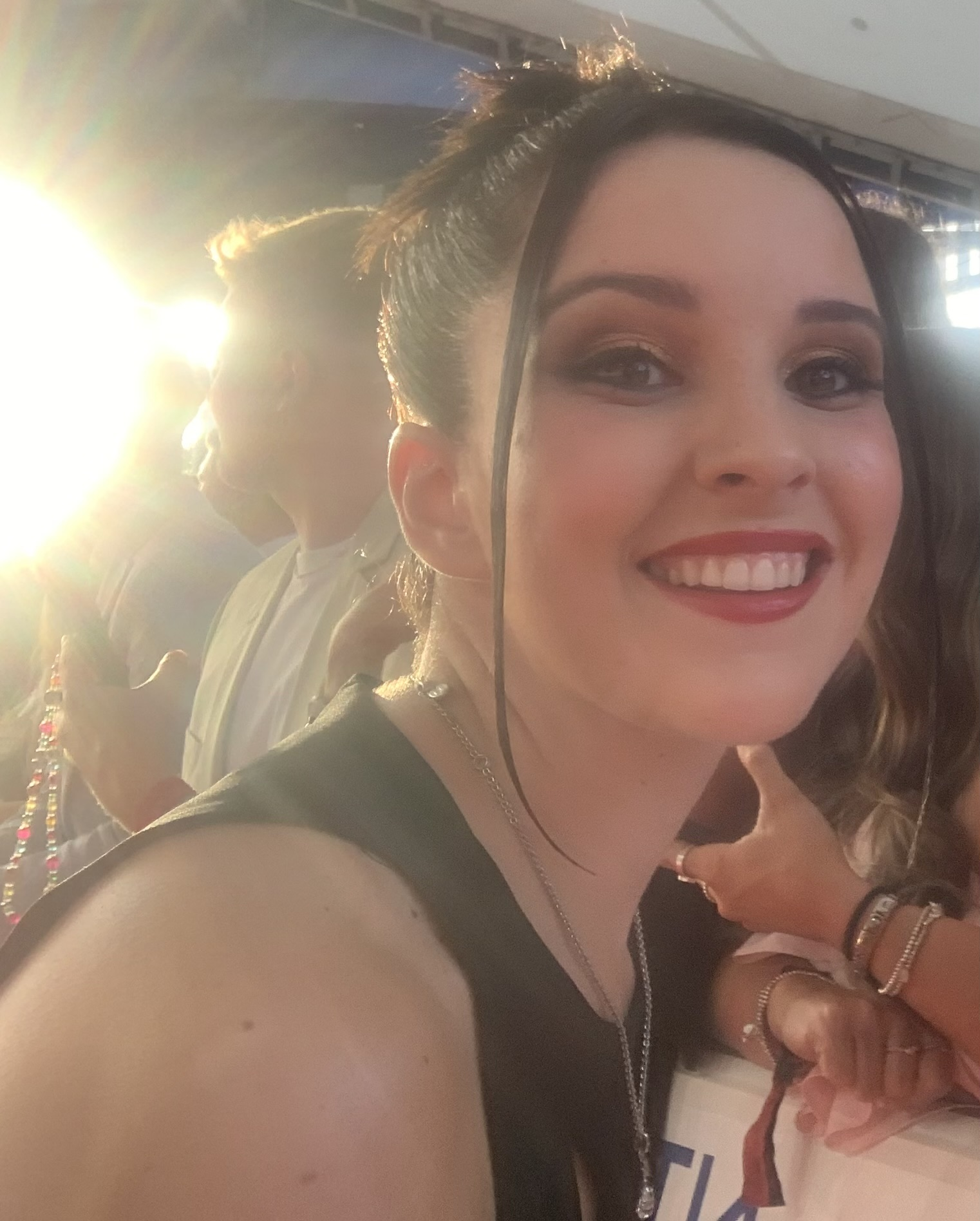
- Mulvaney in 2023
- Born: Elle Jade Mulvaney; 1 October 2002 (age 23); Bury, Greater Manchester, England
- Occupation: Actress
- Years active: 2010–present

Elle Jade Mulvaney (born 1 October 2002) is an English actress who has played the role of Amy Barlow in ITV soap opera Coronation Street.

== Career ==
Mulvaney started her acting through the Carol Godby Theatre Workshop, which she has attended since the age of four. Mulvaney's casting as Amy Barlow was announced in March 2010, when she was seven years old, taking over from Amber Chadwick. She has played the part of Amy ever since. A spokeswoman said "Amy has some big storylines coming up so we decided to recast an older child who could play younger. This is common practice."

== Awards and nominations ==
Year	Award	Category	Work	Result	Ref
2010	Inside Soap Awards	Best Young Actor	Coronation Street	Nominated	
2011	Inside Soap Awards	Best Young Actor	Coronation Street	Nominated	
2012	Inside Soap Awards	Best Young Actor	Coronation Street	Nominated	
2017	British Soap Awards	Best Young Actor	Coronation Street	Won	
2019	British Soap Awards	Best Young Actor	Coronation Street	Nominated	
2023	British Soap Awards	Best Leading Performer	Coronation Street	Longlisted	
