= Cait Fitton =

English actress (born 2002)

- Born: Caitlin Rose Fitton; 8 March 2002 (age 23); Oldham, England
- Occupation: Actress
- Years active: 2013–present
- Television: Gigglebiz; Doctors; Coronation Street

Caitlin Rose Fitton (born 8 March 2002) is an English actress and singer, known for portraying the role of Lauren Bolton on the ITV soap opera Coronation Street since 2022.

== Life and career ==
Fitton was born on 8 March 2002 in Oldham. She ventured into performing arts at the age of three. She attended Siddal Moor Sports College and the Carol Godby Theatre Workshop, and whilst attending the latter, she produced and sold her own CD online to raise money for a children's hospice. In 2013, she made her television debut in the CBBC entertainment series The Johnny and Inel Show as a child singer, and appeared as various characters in the CBeebies comedy programme Gigglebiz. The following year, she appeared in an episode of 4 O'Clock Club. Fitton also appeared in advertisements for Asda and McDonald's.

In June 2020, Fitton appeared in an episode of the BBC medical soap opera Doctors as Jessie Mortimer. In November 2022, Fitton joined the cast of ITV soap opera Coronation Street as Lauren Bolton, the daughter of Reece Bolton (Scott Anson), a member of an extremist group that recruits Max Turner (Paddy Bever) who she begins dating. She leaves in January 2023 after the character's father is arrested and her subsequent break up with Max. Fitton reprised the role five months later on a permanent basis. She told of how being in Coronation Street was her "childhood dream" and that she was "surprised to be asked back" (to the soap) following her initial exit.

== Filmography ==
Year	Title	Role	Notes	Ref.
2013	The Johnny and Inel Show	Child singer	Episode: "The Launch of Jynel"	
2013	Gigglebiz	Various	Recurring role	
2014	4 O'Clock Club	Young girl	1 episode	
2015	Coronation Street	Extra		
2020	Britain's Got Talent	Member of Sign Along With Us		
2020	Doctors	Jessie Mortimer	Episode: "Stepping Stones"	
2022–present	Coronation Street	Lauren Bolton	Regular role	
