= Paddy Bever =

English actor (born 2002)

- Born: Patrick Bever; 26 November 2002 (age 23); Stockport, Greater Manchester, England
- Occupation: Actor
- Years active: 2021–present
- Television: Coronation Street

Patrick Bever (born 26 November 2002) is an English actor, known for portraying the role of Max Turner on the ITV soap opera Coronation Street from 2021 to 2025. For his portrayal of Max, he won the award for Rising Star at the National Television Awards in 2022.

== Life and career ==
Patrick Bever was born on 26 November 2002 in Stockport, Greater Manchester and attended Cheadle Hulme School. He also studied at the Manchester School of Acting prior to his television work. In September 2021, Bever joined the cast of the ITV soap opera Coronation Street as Max Turner. He took over the role from child actor Harry McDermott who had portrayed the role for eleven years, following the show's decision to take the character in a more "mature direction". His storylines on the show have included becoming radicalised by a far-right extremist group and subsequently being sent to prison, as well as a storyline surrounding toxic masculinity which sees the character become the victim of a nude photo leak after being catfished online. For his portrayal of Max, he was nominated for the Best Newcomer award at the British Soap Awards and the Inside Soap Awards.

In October 2022, Bever won the award for Rising Star at the 27th National Television Awards, beating Heartstopper actors Joe Locke and Kit Connor. He also appeared as a guest on the CBBC entertainment programme Saturday Mash-Up! alongside co-stars Elle Mulvaney and James Craven in various segments, one of which he was slimed. In May 2023, he appeared in an episode of This Morning surrounding the Coronation Street street party for the Coronation of Charles III and Camilla. Bever was then longlisted for Best Leading Performer at the 2023 British Soap Awards. In January 2025, it was announced that Bever has quit the role of Max, with his final scenes set to air in Spring 2025. Max's last scenes aired on 12 March 2025.

On 21st May 2026, it was announced that Beaver would make his West End Debut as Henry Creel in Stranger Things: The First Shadow at the Phoenix Theatre, London. Beaver would take on the role of Henry Creel from 12th June 2026.

== Filmography ==
Year	Title	Role	Notes	Ref.
2021–2025	Coronation Street	Max Turner	Regular role	
2022	Saturday Mash-Up!	Himself	Guest	
2023	This Morning	Himself	Guest	

== Stage ==
Year	Title	Role	Notes
2026	Stranger Things: The First Shadow	Henry Creel	Phoenix Theatre, West End

== Awards ==
Year	Ceremony	Award	Nominated work	Result	Ref.
2022	British Soap Awards	Best Newcomer	Coronation Street	Nominated	
2022	Inside Soap Awards	Best Newcomer	Coronation Street	Nominated	
2022	National Television Awards	Rising Star	Coronation Street	Won	
2022	I Talk Telly Awards	Best Newcomer	Coronation Street	Won	
2023	British Soap Awards	Best Leading Performer	Coronation Street	Longlisted	
