= List of Coronation Street characters introduced in 1996 =

Coronation Street characters (1996) List

The following is a list of characters who were introduced to the ITV soap opera Coronation Street in 1996, in order of first appearance.

== Stephen Reid ==
Stephen Reid
- Coronation Street character
- Portrayed by: Todd Boyce
- Duration: 1996–1997, 2007, 2022–2023
- First appearance: 29 January 1996
- Last appearance: 13 October 2023
- Introduced by: Sue Pritchard (1996); Steve Frost (2007); Iain MacLeod (2022)
In-universe information
- Occupation: Businessman; Fast food delivery driver Factory manager Office manager
- Father: Geoff Masters
- Mother: Audrey Roberts
- Adoptive father: Malcolm Reid
- Adoptive mother: Joyce Reid
- Stepfather: Alf Roberts
- Half-sisters: Gail Platt
- Wife: Gabrielle Reid (1999–2023)
- Grandfathers: Robert Potter
- Grandmothers: Nancy Potter
- Nephews: Nick Tilsley; David Platt
- Nieces: Sarah Platt
- Other relatives: Bethany Platt; Billy Platt; Harry Platt; Lily Platt; Harper Platt; Sam Blakeman; Max Turner (adoptive)

Stephen Reid (also Potter) is the son of Audrey Roberts (Sue Nicholls). Audrey's father insists that she give Stephen up for adoption after she gives birth to him at 16 years old. Malcolm Reid (Shane Rimmer), a neighbour and former boyfriend of Audrey, adopts Stephen and later emigrates to Canada with him.

Stephen arrives in Weatherfield to get to know his biological mother and to carry out some business for his firm, KBec, with local tycoon Mike Baldwin (Johnny Briggs). During his stay, Mike's wife and Audrey's best friend, Alma Baldwin (Amanda Barrie), becomes besotted with him and makes her feelings clear, but Stephen is not interested and returns to Canada once his work is completed.

Stephen's nephew, Nick Tilsley (Adam Rickitt), later went to stay with his uncle in Canada for several months after causing trouble for his mother, Stephen's half-sister Gail Platt (Helen Worth), and adoptive father, Martin Platt (Sean Wilson). In 1999, following the break-up of his marriage to Leanne Battersby (Jane Danson), Nick again turned to Stephen, who offered him a job in Canada. Over the years, Audrey maintained regular contact with Stephen and visited him many times. Gail's third husband, Richard Hillman (Brian Capron), also took her to Canada for an impromptu visit at Christmas 2001.

On 10 December 2007, Stephen returned to Weatherfield to spend Christmas with Audrey while on the way to Italy, where he intended to expand his business empire into Europe. On 14 December, Stephen invited his youngest nephew, David Platt (Jack P. Shepherd), to join him in Italy. David accepted, much to the disappointment of his niece Sarah Platt (Tina O'Brien), David's half-sister.

On 21 December, David's ambitions were ruined after Sarah bought some ecstasy tablets from a drug dealer in Leanne's restaurant, Valandros, and planted them in David's drawer at Audrey's Salon. Audrey discovered the pills, and after deciding David was a troublemaker, Stephen left Weatherfield on Boxing Day. Sarah and her daughter, Bethany (Emily Walton), joined him four days later. Gail visited them in June 2008. In 2015, Stephen fired Sarah over the phone when she failed to email him an urgent report.

In 2022, it was reported that Stephen would return as part of a "long-term" storyline. Boyce reprised his role in the episode broadcast on 24 June 2022. In September 2022, Stephen accidentally killed Jenny Connor's (Sally Ann Matthews) boyfriend, Leo Thompkins (Joe Frost), after the latter confronted him about his true financial situation. In January 2023, Leo's father, Teddy Thompkins (Grant Burgin), regained his memory after being hit by a van. He became suspicious of Stephen and threatened to call the police. Not taking any chances, Stephen hit Teddy over the head with a hole punch, killing him. He later killed business rival Rufus by drugging him and drowning him in his own pool, making it look like an accident.

In October, Stephen planned to flee the country as the police closed in on him. After attacking Tim Metcalfe (Joe Duttine), who had grown suspicious of him, and leaving him for dead, Stephen headed for the airport upon realising his partner, Jenny, was also suspicious of him. At the airport, Stephen realised he did not have his passport and returned to Weatherfield, hiding in the closed Rovers Return. Jenny and Sarah met in the pub, where, to their horror, Stephen appeared and knocked Sarah out. After admitting to Jenny that he killed Leo, Teddy, and Rufus, Stephen took her hostage in the street as horrified residents, including Audrey, looked on. Stephen ordered David to bring him his car but then had a change of heart and decided to set Jenny free. Moments later, Stephen was run over by a taxi driven by Peter Barlow (Chris Gascoyne). Michael Bailey (Ryan Russell) administered CPR, but despite all efforts to save his life, Stephen succumbed to his injuries and died, leaving Audrey heartbroken.

== Kelly Thomson ==
Kelly Thomson
- Coronation Street character
- Portrayed by: Sarah Moffett
- First appearance: 9 February 1996
- Last appearance: 20 December 1996
- Introduced by: Sue Pritchard
In-universe information
- Occupation: Childminder
- Mother: Lorraine Thomson

Kelly Thomson played by Sarah Moffett, first appears on 9 February 1996 when Ken Barlow (William Roache) hires her as a childminder for his son, Daniel Osbourne (Lewis Harney). She later moves in with the family and begins a relationship with Ashley Peacock (Steven Arnold). Their relationship ends later in the year when she agrees to follow Daniel and his mother, Denise (Denise Black), to Scotland to continue her job, now working for Denise instead of Ken.

== Lee Middleton ==
Lee Middleton
- Coronation Street character
- Portrayed by: Nicholas Bailey
- Duration: 1996–1997
- First appearance: 16 February 1996
- Last appearance: 10 November 1997
- Introduced by: Sue Pritchard
In-universe information
- Father: Clive Middleton
- Mother: Pam Middleton
- Sisters: Fiona Middleton

Lee Middleton, played by Nicholas Bailey, is the brother of Fiona Middleton (Angela Griffin), who first appears when Fiona turned to him for a loan when Denise Osbourne (Denise Black) offered her the lease on her salon for £4,500. He was unimpressed, but gave her the loan with a year to pay it back. He subsequently tried to pressure her to rent out the flat above the salon. He also helped Maxine Heavey (Tracy Shaw) and Liz McDonald (Beverley Callard) with the preparations of the opening of the salon. In December 1996, he let Fiona off with her loan.

When Fiona got engaged to Alan McKenna (Glenn Hugill) in February 1997, Lee refused to go to the engagement party as he was a white policeman, but did attend Alan's stag night but was subjected to racial abuse from Alan's policeman friends. Lee was also in attendance at Fiona and Alan's wedding which was called off when her one-night-stand with Jim McDonald (Charlie Lawson) was revealed.

== Joyce Smedley ==
Joyce Smedley
- Coronation Street character
- Portrayed by: Anita Carey
- Duration: 1996–1997
- First appearance: 23 February 1996
- Last appearance: 21 February 1997
- Introduced by: Sue Pritchard
In-universe information
- Occupation: Cleaner
- Daughters: Judy Mallett
- Grandsons: Billy Mallett
- Granddaughters: Becky Mallett

Joyce Smedley, played by Anita Carey, was introduced in February 1996 as the mother of Judy Mallett (Gaynor Faye).

Joyce takes a job as a cleaner at the Rovers Return and becomes a love interest for both Alec Gilroy (Roy Barraclough) and Percy Sugden (Bill Waddington), although she does not encourage Percy. In February 1997, while walking her dog, Scamper, Joyce is run over and killed by a car driven by Tony Horrocks (Lee Warburton).

== Clive Middleton ==
Clive Middleton
- Coronation Street character
- Portrayed by: Joe Speare
- Duration: 1996–1997
- First appearance: 15 March 1996
- Last appearance: 10 November 1997
- Introduced by: Sue Pritchard
In-universe information
- Occupation: Train Operator
- Wife: Pam Middleton
- Sons: Lee Middleton
- Daughters: Fiona Middleton

Clive Middleton, played by Joe Speare, is the father of Fiona Middleton (Angela Griffin). He appears in Weatherfield for the opening of their daughter's salon. Clive argues with his son Lee Middleton (Nicholas Bailey) upon learning that he lent Fiona money when he refused to lend him £2,000 for a new car. Lee tells him that he did not think Clive would pay him back.

Clive and Pam later meet Fiona and her fiancé Alan McKenna (Glenn Hugill) for dinner and offer to pay for their wedding. After Alan calls the wedding off, they comfort their daughter.

== Pam Middleton ==
Pam Middleton
- Coronation Street character
- Portrayed by: Elizabeth Estensen
- Duration: 1996–1998
- First appearance: 16 February 1996
- Last appearance: 25 September 1998
- Introduced by: Sue Pritchard
In-universe information
- Father: Clive Middleton
- Mother: Pam Middleton
- Sisters: Fiona Middleton

Pam Middleton, portrayed by Elizabeth Estensen, is the mother of Fiona Middleton (Angela Griffin). She arrives in Weatherfield for the opening of their daughter's salon. Clive argues with his son Lee Middleton (Nicholas Bailey) upon learning that he lent Fiona money when he refused to lend him £2,000 for a new car. Lee tells him that he did not think Clive would pay him back.

Clive and Pam later meet Fiona and her fiancé Alan McKenna (Glenn Hugill) for dinner and offer to pay for their wedding. After Alan calls the wedding off, they comfort their daughter. Pam returns to help and advise Fiona to sell up and leave the Street, after she discovers her partner Steve McDonald (Simon Gregson) has had an affair. In 2019, when Steve meets his daughter Emma Brooker (Alexandra Mardell), who is Fiona's daughter, if her grandmother was still alive, she told him she lives on the Isle of Wight.

== Claire Palmer ==
Claire Palmer
- Coronation Street character
- Portrayed by: Maggie Norris
- Duration: 1996–1997
- First appearance: 8 May 1996
- Last appearance: 14 April 1997
- Introduced by: Sue Pritchard
In-universe information
- Husband: Jeff Palmer (backstory)
- Daughters: Becky Palmer

Claire Palmer, played by Maggie Norris, who first appears on 8 May 1996, is the girlfriend of Des Barnes (Phillip Middlemiss). Des and Claire have a whirlwind romance, and she moves in with him two months later, despite still claiming her dead husband's RAF pension. The couple are forced to move out again to avoid being found out, but by the end of the year, Claire gives up the pension for Des. A few months later, however, Claire sees Des making a pass at Samantha Failsworth (Tina Hobley); she immediately packs her bags and leaves.

== Becky Palmer ==
Becky Palmer
- Coronation Street character
- Portrayed by: Emily Aston
- Duration: 1996–1997
- First appearance: 20 May 1996
- Last appearance: 16 March 1997
- Introduced by: Sue Pritchard
In-universe information
- Father: Jeff Palmer
- Mother: Claire Palmer

Rebecca "Becky" Palmer, played by Emily Aston, is the daughter of Claire Palmer (Maggie Norris) and first appears on 20 May 1996. Becky moves to the Street when her mother meets Des Barnes (Phillip Middlemiss) at the market and they begin a relationship. When Des and Claire split up the following year, Becky moves away with her mother.

== Samantha Failsworth ==
Samantha Failsworth
- Coronation Street character
- Portrayed by: Tina Hobley
- Duration: 1996–1998
- First appearance: 17 July 1996
- Last appearance: 15 June 1998
- Introduced by: Sue Pritchard
In-universe information
- Occupation: Barmaid
- Father: Clive Failsworth
- Mother: Marjorie Failsworth
- Husband: Ritchie Fitzgerald (until 1997)

Samantha Failsworth (previously Fitzgerald), played by Tina Hobley, makes her first appearance on 17 July 1996 when she asks landlord Jack Duckworth for a job at the Rovers Return. Jack likes the look of her, and, without his wife Vera's approval, he takes her on. When Vera returns, she is furious, but Samantha wins her over by referring to Vera as the boss rather than Jack. Samantha later moves into the Street, house-sharing with newly single Curly Watts and then, after ending Des Barnes's relationship with Claire Palmer, she begins dating Des.

In late 1997, Samantha's estranged husband, Ritchie Fitzgerald, turns up hoping for a reconciliation. Instead, he faces months of Samantha claiming their marriage is over, before they spend the night together behind Des' back. Nevertheless, Samantha goes ahead with divorce proceedings until Des finds out, and Samantha is once again undecided about which man to choose. Ritchie gives up on his marriage, and Des forgives her until she cheats on him again with mechanic Chris Collins in 1998.

Following their split, Des becomes close to Natalie Horrocks, and Samantha is envious. She claims she is pregnant with Des' child and then says she has had an abortion. It is eventually revealed that there was no baby to begin with, but Samantha changes her story and maintains she did suffer a miscarriage. In the end, Samantha tells Des she is still pregnant with his child and leaves Weatherfield in June 1998. Although Natalie firmly believes she was lying, Des is never sure, and Samantha has never been heard from again.

== Alan McKenna ==
Alan McKenna
- Coronation Street character
- Portrayed by: Glenn Hugill
- Duration: 1996–1997
- First appearance: 8 November 1996
- Last appearance: 16 November 1997
- Introduced by: Sue Pritchard
In-universe information
- Occupation: Detective
- Father: Bernard McKenna
- Mother: Mary McKenna
- Sons: Morgan Middleton

Alan McKenna, played by Glenn Hugill, was a detective, who was engaged to Fiona Middleton (Angela Griffin). They were due to marry in 1997, but Alan called the engagement off when Jim McDonald (Charlie Lawson) exposed his one-night-stand with Fiona. He then departed Weatherfield after a year.

Unbeknownst to him, Fiona fell pregnant with his son, Morgan Middleton (Connor Chatburn/Corey Weekes), who was born in 1998 and was intended to be adopted by Fiona's new fiancée, and Jim's son, Steve McDonald (Simon Gregson), but this relationship fell through also and he was raised, alongside his half-sister and Steve's daughter, Emma Brooker (Alexandra Mardell) by their stepfather and Fiona's husband, John Brooker (Noel White).

== Robert Preston ==
Robert Preston
- Coronation Street character
- Portrayed by: Julian Kay (1996–2003); Tristan Gemmill (2015–2019)
- Duration: 1996, 1999, 2003, 2015–2019
- First appearance: Episode 4090; 11 November 1996
- Last appearance: Episode 9961; 25 December 2019
- Introduced by: Brian Park (1996); David Hanson (1999); Kieran Roberts (2003); Stuart Blackburn (2015)
In-universe information
- Occupation: Carpet fitter Restaurateur; Businessman
- Father: Maurice Preston
- Mother: Shirley Preston
- Wife: Tracy Barlow (1996–2003); Joni Preston (2004–2015)
- Sons: Sonny Jefferies

Robert Preston made his first screen appearance on 11 November 1996. The character was played by Julian Kay from his introduction until 2003, and by Tristan Gemmill from 2015 to 2019.

On 6 April 2015, it was announced that Robert would be returning to Coronation Street later in the year. According to The Sun, an actor had yet to be cast but producers were looking for someone around the age of 35. On 10 May, it was confirmed that Tristan Gemmill had been cast in the role. Gemmill was contracted for a year and commented, "I'm excited to be joining such an iconic show. Coronation Street is a great British institution and it will be a huge challenge to meet the expectations of its devoted audience. But it is a challenge I am really looking forward to." Robert returned for the funeral of Deirdre Barlow (Anne Kirkbride). On 26 April 2019, Gemmill announced that after four years of playing Robert, he would be leaving the show later that year. It was later confirmed that Robert would be killed off as part of a Christmas storyline.

Robert is the fiancé of Tracy Barlow (Dawn Acton). In 1996, Deirdre and Ken meet Robert Preston, their future son-in-law, and take to him. Shirley (Maggie Tagney) and Maurice Preston (Seamus O'Neill) have tea with the Barlows and Robert. Tracy is nervous to meet her new in-laws, and Ken is put out when working-class Maurice takes against him for being a teacher. Deirdre is upset when the Prestons tell her that they don't want Robert to marry Tracy, as he's on the rebound.

Eventually, the wedding day arrives. Maurice Preston tells the Barlows that Robert and his best man, Paul Davies, have disappeared and never returned from the stag night. He thinks Robert has changed his mind about marrying Tracy, but she is adamant he will turn up. Ken and Deirdre try to find Robert. One of his friends, Greg, remembers locking him in a container in a freight yard. They go to look for him, but all the containers are empty apart from two sealed ones that are on their way to Saudi Arabia. Deirdre has to stop herself from going for Greg. The police are called in to stop the shipment, fearing Robert could have suffocated. Ken and Deirdre return home to find Robert there, being shouted at by Tracy for seeing her before the service. He explains he let himself out of the container. Tracy and Robert are married, and afterwards, Ken makes a speech and Percy produces the wedding cake. After the wedding in 1996, Robert does not appear for three years.

Robert returns in March 1999 after Tracy goes on a spending spree using his credit card. Ken is shocked when Robert turns up, demanding to see Tracy. He explains he caught Tracy kissing another man. Ken refuses to tell him where Tracy is but lets him stay the night. Tracy refuses to explain herself to Robert. Ken and Deirdre succeed in getting the Prestons to sit down together and talk. They get caught in the crossfire when Robert and Tracy argue about her friendship with Dan. Robert tells Ken that his marriage is over. Tracy admits to Deirdre that Dan did want an affair with her, but she didn’t. Deirdre urges her not to make the mistakes she has made and advises her to stick with Robert.

Linda chats up Robert and is disappointed when he tells her that he is married. Tracy sees them talking and flares up at him, refusing to discuss reconciliation. Robert leaves again and reappears on the Street in October 1999 for Ken's sixtieth birthday party. Robert then leaves the Street once more, making a final appearance on 1 January 2003. Tracy (now played by Kate Ford) has returned to Weatherfield without Robert, telling Deirdre that she found Robert in bed with her best friend. Deirdre phones Robert and asks him to come to talk to her. When Robert arrives, it becomes clear that Tracy was lying—it was she who was caught in bed with Robert's best friend, not the other way round. Robert says their marriage is over and leaves. Tracy shows no concern when he tells her that he will divorce her, which he does.

Twelve years later, in 2015, Deirdre dies and Robert returns to Weatherfield for her funeral. Tracy is surprised to see Robert watching the funeral party from across the street as they leave for the church. Emily recognises Robert at the funeral. Upset, Tracy walks out of the church, and Robert follows her. He comforts Tracy as she weeps by Blanche's grave, telling her he came to pay his respects after reading about Deirdre's death in the paper.

Steve comes out to fetch Tracy and is introduced to a fellow ex-husband of hers. Back on the Street, Robert calls on Tracy at No.1 to keep her company and cooks a meal for her. Tracy can't understand why Robert is being so nice to her. Despite his reservations, they start to kiss. Liz persuades Ken to fetch Tracy to the wake. He finds Tracy and Robert in a clinch and throws Robert out, asking Tracy how low she can get.

Tony's former henchmen, Nev and Rik, barge into Barlow's Buys and demand money he owes them for some foot spas from Tracy. As they turn menacing, Robert enters the shop and comes to her rescue, sending them packing. Tracy and Robert go for a drink, and he tells her he now wants to be a chef. Behind her back, he takes a mobile phone call and tells the caller a series of lies about where he has been. Robert tells Tracy how he has never stopped loving her, but she tells him her head is in bits as it is without this.

Robert apologises to Ken for his behaviour after the funeral. Spotting Deirdre's stuffed marrow recipe on the table, he offers to cook it for him and Tracy. Ken and Tracy admit that Robert's stuffed marrow is better than Deirdre's. Ken and Tracy are bored as they sort through Deirdre's paperwork. Tracy is pleased when Robert invites them to a trade fair. Tracy and Robert have wine at No.1, unaware of the visit from Robert's wife, Joni. Ken passes on Joni's message to Robert, who tells Tracy that Joni manages his restaurant. Tony advises Robert to run a mile from Tracy. Ken is pleased that Tracy and Robert have got back together and compares them to him and Deirdre.

At the restaurant, Joni apologises to Robert, who hides his guilt. When Tracy receives a text from Robert cancelling their evening together as he has to work, Beth suggests they visit him. In 2017, Robert starts a relationship with Steve McDonald's soon-to-be-ex-wife, Michelle Connor. He wants Michelle to divorce Steve and move in with him for romance and business.

In 2019, Robert cheated on Michelle by having an affair with resident Vicky Jefferies (Kerri Quinn), who later fell pregnant and gave birth to their son, Sonny. However, Robert never had the chance to know his son. He was hospitalised on Christmas Day that year after being shot by Derek Milligan (Craige Els), a client of local builder Gary Windass (Mikey North), whom he had sought to kill for ruining his chances of reconciling with his family. After apologising to Michelle for cheating on her, and despite his efforts to recover, Robert dies from his gunshot injury in hospital after going into cardiac arrest, as he has had previous heart issues.

== Others ==
Date(s)	Character	Actor	Circumstances
11–13 November	Shirley Preston	Maggie Tagney	The parents of Robert Preston (Julian Kay). They attended Robert's wedding to Tracy Barlow (Dawn Acton). After Robert goes missing after his stag night, Shirley, Maurice and the Barlows search for him; despite fears that he has been shipped to Saudi Arabia after his drunken friends lock him in a container, Robert turns up to the Barlow household. Maurice died from cancer in 2003. Robert visited Shirley for Christmas in 2016.
11–13 November	Maurice Preston	Seamus O'Neill	The parents of Robert Preston (Julian Kay). They attended Robert's wedding to Tracy Barlow (Dawn Acton). After Robert goes missing after his stag night, Shirley, Maurice and the Barlows search for him; despite fears that he has been shipped to Saudi Arabia after his drunken friends lock him in a container, Robert turns up to the Barlow household. Maurice died from cancer in 2003. Robert visited Shirley for Christmas in 2016.
