= List of Coronation Street characters introduced in 2021 =

Coronation Street characters introduced in 2021

Coronation Street is a British soap opera first broadcast on 9 December 1960. The following is a list of characters introduced in 2021, by order of first appearance. All characters are introduced by series producer Iain MacLeod. The first character to be introduced is Lucas Kempton (Glen Wallace) in January, as a love interest of Carla Connor (Alison King). Teenager Jacob Hay (Jack James Ryan) arrives in February, followed by Ronnie Bailey (Vinta Morgan), the brother of Ed Bailey (Trevor Michael Georges), later that month. In March, drug lord Harvey Gaskell (Will Mellor) made his first appearance. Stefan Brent (Paul Opacic) was introduced in April as the father of Corey Brent (Maximus Evans). Curtis Delamere (Sam Retford) then made his first appearance in May as a love interest for Emma Brooker (Alexandra Mardell). Mia (Madeline Edmondson) begins appearing in September as an inmate that befriends Kelly Neelan (Millie Gibson) in prison, as well as Leo Thompkins (Joe Frost), a construction worker hired by the Platt family. Rebecca Ryan then joined the cast in December as Lydia Chambers. Additionally, multiple other characters appear throughout the year.

== Lucas Kempton ==
Lucas Kempton
- Coronation Street character
- Portrayed by: Glen Wallace
- First appearance: Episode 10,235; 29 January 2021
- Last appearance: Episode 10,305; 21 April 2021
- Introduced by: Iain MacLeod
In-universe information
- Occupation: Businessowner

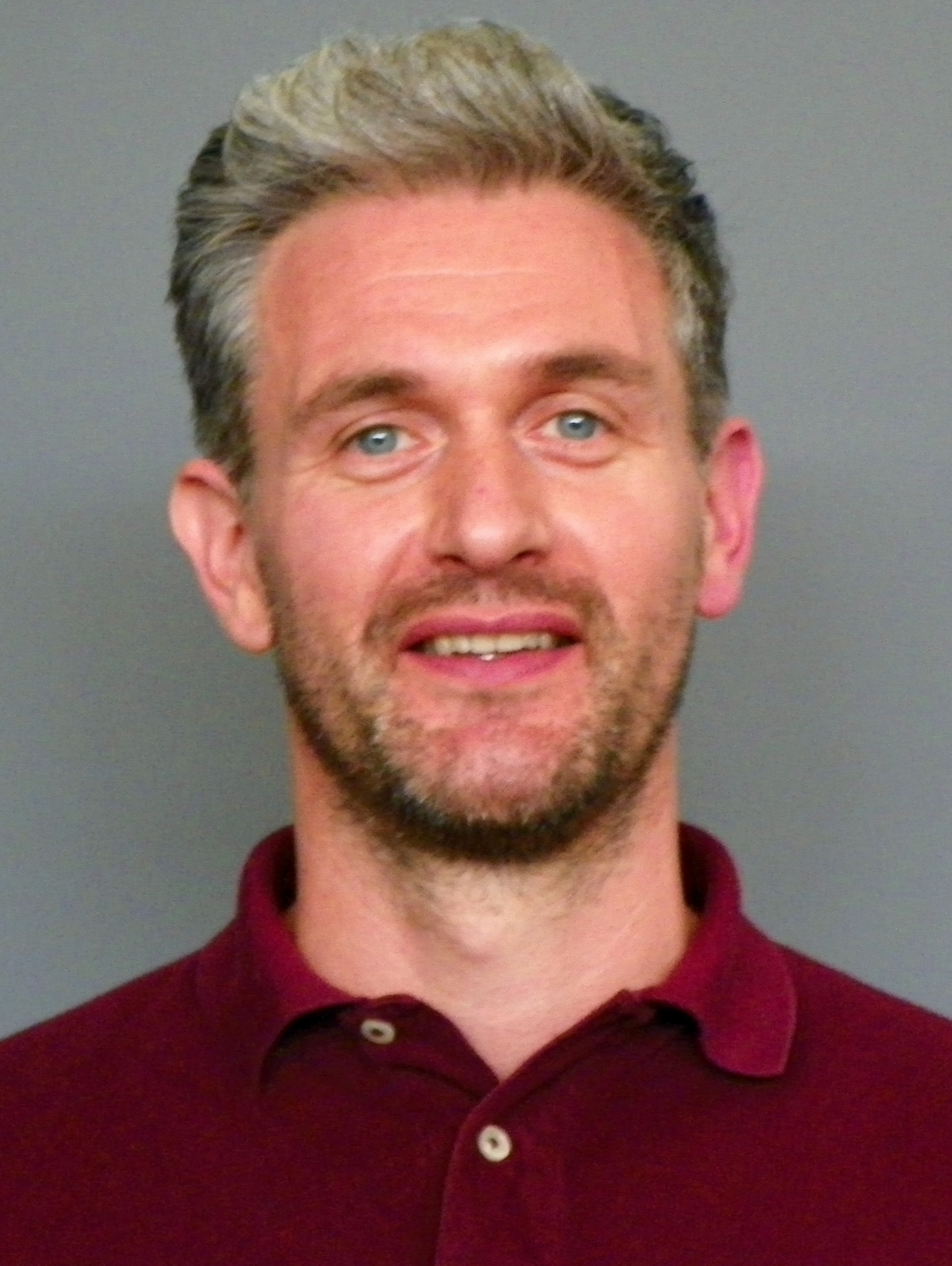
Glen Wallace portrays Lucas.

Lucas Kempton, played by Glen Wallace, first appeared on 29 January 2021. He is introduced as a friend of Carla Connor's (Alison King) whom she met whilst staying in Devon. He surprises Carla when she is waiting for a business client for the Underworld clothing factory, who turns out to be Lucas.

Wallace expressed his joy with the way that his character was introduced, noting that he enjoys that Lucas has an established relationship with Carla. He states that it is "not clear exactly what happened between them in the past," and Inside Soap write that Carla is "visibly uneasy" when she comes into contact with Lucas. On Carla's romantic history with Peter Barlow (Chris Gascoyne), Wallace explained that while the viewers know their backstory, "Lucas doesn’t – and he doesn’t care." He defends his character, explaining that Lucas is not "heartless," but due to being a businessman, he is "used to overcoming obstacles in his life," and refers to Peter as "another obstacle" to Lucas. He also hinted that his character has regrets, and that since he is "no longer willing to miss out on life's opportunities," this motivates him to pursue Carla. He adds that Lucas sees a future with her. Wallace voiced his wishes to stay on Coronation Street for a long tenure, joking that he would like for his character to have a pint of beer with Ken Barlow (William Roache) in the Rovers Return.

== Jacob Hay ==
Jacob Hay
- Coronation Street character
- Portrayed by: Jack James Ryan
- Duration: 2021–2023
- First appearance: Episode 10,237; 1 February 2021
- Last appearance: Episode 10,851; 13 January 2023
- Introduced by: Iain MacLeod
In-universe information
- Occupation: Food deliverer Drug dealer Factory worker
- Father: Damon Hay
- Uncles: Harvey Gaskell
- Other relatives: Sharon Bentley

Jacob Hay, played by Jack James Ryan, first appeared on 1 February 2021. He is a colleague of Simon Barlow (Alex Bain), who he works with at a food delivery company. When Simon reveals to him that he is struggling for money, Jacob gives him £60. When Simon's friend Kelly Neelan (Millie Gibson) sees Jacob with Simon, she makes a comment about how he cannot be trusted. She later states that while at another school, he was in a relationship with her friend, and treated her badly. She then explains that he was also imprisoned for stabbing somebody over an incident involving drugs. Simon dismisses her comments, stating that people can change following their mistakes.

The character and Ryan's casting was announced on 29 January 2021. It was stated that Jacob would "shake things up" in Coronation Street, and it was confirmed that he is part of a gang that sell drugs disguised as food deliveries. On his casting, Ryan took to social media to state that he is "incredibly proud" to be able to appear on the soap, and stated that he found it difficult to keep his casting a secret. He explained that since he is from Manchester, he "can't quite articulate what it means" to be part of the cast of Coronation Street, and confirmed that he has watched the show since he was young, and always hoped to "step on those cobbles."

In scenes aired on 12 March 2021, it is revealed that Jacob has been secretly ripping drug lord Harvey Gaskell (Will Mellor) off. When Harvey discovers his betrayal, he orders a beating for Jacob, and he is put into hospital. Following the episode, actor Ryan confirmed that the scenes were his last. He thanked the fans of the soap for welcoming him, and added that his time on Coronation Street was "an absolute dream come true" for him. However, Jacob returns in 2022 after series producer Iain MacLeod decided to bring him back to the soap. He explained his decision, stating that Ryan is a good actor and that the character "feels very Coronation Street and he's got funny bones. He's got a really good way with the comedy and feels very authentic as well." His return storyline sees him revealed as the boyfriend of Amy Barlow (Elle Mulvaney); the producers formed the relationship as they liked the idea of pairing a bad boy up with "somebody who is historically quite well behaved and wouldn't say boo to a goose." MacLeod added that the relationship will also explore Jacob's redemption as it explains how he ended up in the drugs industry. He felt that while Jacob has done some bad things, he is mature enough to know he needs to make amends in the town. He hoped that the scenes would "reframe people's view of him and make you see him in a slightly different light."

== Ronnie Bailey ==
Ronnie Bailey
- Coronation Street character
- Portrayed by: Vinta Morgan
- Duration: 2021–present
- First appearance: Episode 10,253; 19 February 2021
- Introduced by: Iain MacLeod
- Crossover appearances: Corriedale (2026)
In-universe information
- Occupation: Businessperson
- Father: Sarge Bailey
- Brothers: Ed Bailey
- Wife: Ruth (backstory); Kat Bailey; Debbie Webster (2026–present)
- Stepsons: Carl Webster
- Nephews: Michael Bailey; James Bailey
- Nieces: Dee Dee Bailey
- Other relatives: Glory Bailey; Laila Bailey

Ronnie Bailey, played by Vinta Morgan, made his first appearance on 19 February 2021. The character and casting details were announced in January 2021, when details of a storyline regarding the Bailey family undergoing systematic racism was also announced. Ronnie is introduced as the brother of established character Ed (Trevor Michael Georges). It was stated that upon his arrival, he will be "a massive injection of chaos, energy and humour." Ronnie was described as a "real jack the lad," and it was stated that he "will tip [the Bailey family's] currently-quite-cosy lifestyle on its head," and that "he'll be setting many cats among many pigeons up and down the street, much to Ed's exasperation at times." Executive producer Iain MacLeod added that Ronnie "will arrive off the back of quite a big family drama and he turns up with a secret." His backstory was later confirmed; Ronnie is a 51-year-old single man from London who looks to relocate to Weatherfield for unknown reasons. He is described as "the wayward uncle who can be slightly ruthless but irrepressibly charming," and it was noted that he is good with business decisions and money. It was also hinted that he would look for romance in Weatherfield.

MacLeod teased that Ronnie arrives at "the worst possible time," since he arrives in Weatherfield at the same time that Grace Vickers (Kate Spencer) goes into labour prematurely. He compared his arrival to "holding the hand grenade with the pin already out and just wondering when to drop it," but added that he "means no malice" by his actions. MacLeod also compared Ronnie's personality to former character Danny Baldwin (Bradley Walsh), noting that like Danny, Ronnie is "slightly ruthless but also irrepressibly charming," and that Coronation Street has not had a character like Ronnie "for a while." Morgan's portrayal of Ronnie was not initially announced. Without giving any details on the portrayer, MacLeod stated that the actor is "fabulous" and "really, really strong." When his casting was announced, Morgan stated: "It's so great to be joining Coronation Street. I grew up watching it, I know the characters, I've lived the stories and now, to play my part on the street, I can only say I'm blessed. In my household it has always been a firm favourite," and added that Ronnie is an "enigmatic character."

Ronnie's estranged wife Kat Bailey (Melissa Bailey) arrives in Weatherfield, due to him ignoring her phone calls. He explains that he wants to stay in Weatherfield since he needs to know if Michael (Ryan Russell) is his son or his nephew. Morgan explained that after Ronnie keeping the secret for over three decades, it is the actions of Kat that motivate him to find out the truth. He explains that prior to Aggie (Lorna Laidlaw) meeting Ed, she had a relationship with Ronnie, and the timeline of Michael's birth means that Ronnie could be Ronnie's father. Morgan states that due to being 50 and having no children, Ronnie is "yearning for fatherhood," and that if Michael is his son, it "would mean everything to him." He also hinted that if this were the case, Ronnie would not have an issue with telling Ed, since he is "slightly arrogant."

In 2026, Chloe Timms from Inside Soap wrote that she "loved" Ronnie and Debbie together. For his role as Ronnie, Morgan was longlisted for "Best Actor" at the 2026 Inside Soap Awards.

== Harvey Gaskell ==
Harvey Gaskell
- Coronation Street character
- Portrayed by: Will Mellor
- Duration: 2021–2022, 2024
- First appearance: Episode 10271; 12 March 2021
- Last appearance: Episode 11225; 27 March 2024
- Introduced by: Iain MacLeod (2021, 2024)
In-universe information
- Occupation: Drug lord
- Father: Wayne Gaskell
- Half-brothers: Damon Hay
- Grandfathers: Geoffrey Gaskell
- Grandmothers: Karen Gaskell
- Uncles: Gary Gaskell; Darren Gaskell
- Aunts: Sharon Gaskell
- Nephews: Jacob Hay

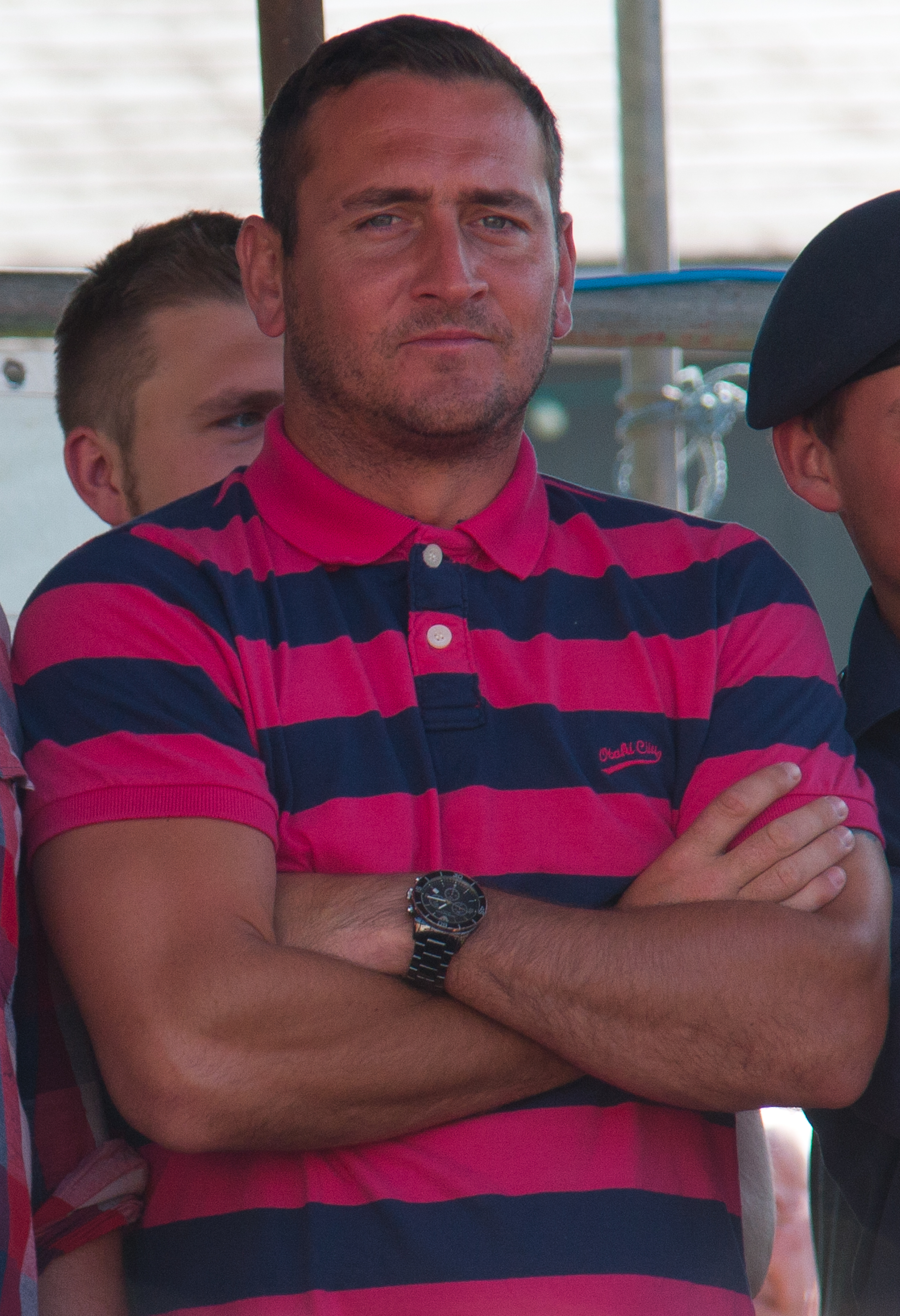
Will Mellor portrays Harvey.

Harvey Gaskell, played by Will Mellor, made his first appearance on 12 March 2021. Harvey is the drug lord boss of Simon Barlow (Alex Bain) and Jacob Hay (Jack James Ryan). The character and Mellor's casting was announced on 9 February 2021, where it was stated that his character will "pile on the pressure" for Simon, and that when Simon and adoptive mother Leanne Battersby (Jane Danson) tries to free himself from the drug business, Harvey "no intention of letting them out of his grasp." On joining the soap, he commented: "I'm honoured to be asked to come into Coronation Street, it's such an iconic show and has been a huge part of my family life." He recalled that when he began acting, it was his mother's dream for him to join the soap, so he was happy to "finally be able to make it come true." He described the soap as a "Manchester institution," and that he was pleased to have finally appeared in the series. Talking about the character, Mellor stated that Harvey is the first "out-and-out baddie" he has played in his career, which made him excited to portray the role, adding that Harvey will "make some waves" in Weatherfield.

Executive producer Iain MacLeod expressed his excitement at Mellor's casting, and noted that he has "thrown himself heart and soul into making his character as terrifyingly real as possible." He confirmed that Harvey would have a large impact on the characters involved in the drug dealing storyline "from the moment he swaggers menacingly onto the screen." Mellor described Harvey as a "seasoned baddie who turns vulnerable people into drug dealers and bullies them into doing things they don't want to." He added that when Harvey threatens to break somebody's legs, "he means it." Mellor stated that he was "apprehensive" to join Coronation Street as a villain, and believes he will be confronted on the street by fans of the soap. Mellor explained that despite the soap being fictional, "die-hard fans feel everything for these characters" which led him to fear he would get a negative response from viewers. Prior to his first appearance airing, Mellor was already receiving messages from fans of the soap telling him to "leave Simon and Leanne alone," so he anticipated even more messages following his scenes airing.

After a trial, Harvey is found guilty of drug offences after Sharon betrayed him by providing evidence only to take his position as a drug lord. It was stated that Mellor had left the soap following Harvey's sentencing; however, in August 2021, Mellor was spotted filming for the soap again. It was then confirmed that he would be returning to Coronation Street. Harvey escapes from prison to get revenge on Leanne for sending him to prison and accidentally shoots Natasha Blakeman (Rachel Leskovac) in a case of mistaken identity as she is wearing the same Halloween costume as Leanne. Natasha dies in hospital from her injuries and Harvey goes back to prison after Leanne crashes the car into a skip and knocks Harvey unconscious.

== Stefan Brent ==
Stefan Brent
- Coronation Street character
- Portrayed by: Paul Opacic
- Duration: 2021, 2024
- First appearance: Episode 10,309; 26 April 2021
- Last appearance: Episode 11,353/4; 2 September 2024
- Introduced by: Iain MacLeod
In-universe information
- Occupation: Publisher
- Wife: Coral Brent (backstory)
- Sons: Corey Brent

Stefan Brent, played by Paul Opacic, made his first appearance on 26 April 2021. Stefan was the "rich businessman father" of established character Corey Brent (Maximus Evans). Louise McCreesh stated that his introduction will see him spar with Dev Alahan (Jimmi Harkishin) over the rekindling of Corey's relationship with Dev's daughter Asha Alahan (Tanisha Gorey). McCreesh also hinted that the situation could lead to a "violent head between the warring dads." Tamara Davidson of the Daily Mirror wrote that Stefan would be the next villain on Coronation Street, and that he would "take part in a major new storyline and cause chaos on the street." Due to Stefan's son Corey being disliked by viewers, Davidson wrote "wait to see what kind of monster created him." Stefan Brent used his wealth to cover up the murder committed by his son Corey and help to clear his name in court during the trial of Kelly Neelan. Eventually, evidence of Corey's murder would be collected, and this revelation was made to both Stefan and Corey whilst they were attempting to flee the area, instead being taken hostage by Gary Windass and delivered to the police station.

On 11 June 2024, Digital Spy Confirmed that Paul Opacic would reprise his role as Stefan Brent for the Abi Franklin (Sally Carman) and Corey story. Once Abi discovers Stefan is behind the creation of the documentary, Abi believes that Stefan must have created the recent deep fake videos using her image. On 29 August 2024, it was announced that Stefan's ex-wife, Coral Brent (Kate Cook) would be introduced to the series. She apologises to Abi for her ex-husband and son's behaviours.

== Lisa Swain ==
Lisa Swain
- Coronation Street character
- Portrayed by: Vicky Myers
- Duration: 2021–present
- First appearance: Episode 10,319; 7 May 2021
- Introduced by: Iain MacLeod
- Crossover appearances: Corriedale (2026)
In-universe information
- Other names: DS Lisa Swain; DS Swain
- Occupation: Detective Sergeant
- Wife: Becky Swain (until 2026); Carla Connor (2026–present)
- Daughters: Betsy Swain

DS Lisa Swain (Also Connor-Swain), played by Vicky Myers, first appeared on 7 May 2021. She is a detective who works at Weatherfield Police Station and has investigated multiple crimes since her introduction, such as the murder of Seb Franklin (Harry Visinoni) and the assault on Nina Lucas (Mollie Gallagher) by a gang led by Corey Brent (Maximus Evans), the death of Imran Habeeb (Charlie De Melo), and then investigated Aaron Sandford (James Craven) when he raped Amy Barlow (Elle Mulvaney), and the crimes of serial killer, Stephen Reid (Todd Boyce). She was credited as DS Swain until 24 April 2023 when her forename was revealed to be Lisa in dialogue. She also investigated the disappearance of Lauren Bolton (Cait Fitton), which led to her being promoted to regular cast, due to appearing more frequently. For her role as Lisa, Myers was longlisted for "Best newcomer" at the 2024 Inside Soap Awards.

On 4 March 2024, after appearing on a recurring basis for nearly three years, it was announced that Myers had been promoted to a regular character as she is seen appearing more frequently. When told of her promotion, Myers told Digital Spy: "We're only just scratching the surface with Swain. When I got the call that this was happening, it was very much that she was the itch that I needed to scratch." Myers also discussed the character's sexuality and revealed that she is gay by saying "Relationship-wise, we know she has a teenage daughter. I'm not entirely sure if everybody knows this, but Swain is gay. I think she perhaps has seen somebody that's caught her eye but at the moment she's far too busy with focusing on this investigation, her career, being a single mum and juggling her home life as well with her teenage daughter."

On 21 June 2024, Swain's daughter, Betsy (Sydney Martin) was introduced to the series, when she began to become suspicious of Joel Deering's (Callum Lill) actions towards her friend, Sabrina Adetiba (Luana Santos). However, she wasn't revealed to be her daughter until 28 June, when Lisa confronted her about the chips and she knew that Betsy didn't have the money for them, so she lied to Lisa and said a friend bought them, when in fact the money was from Joel who she was blackmailing in order to keep quiet, showing some tension in their relationship. Sydney Martin, who plays Betsy, discussed her relationship with her mother, "obviously she's lost her other mum when she was on duty, so she already has some disrespect for the career. Lisa stayed on, and that causes a bit of tension in their relationship."

== DC Wiley ==
DC Wiley
- Coronation Street character
- Portrayed by: Ashley Campbell
- Duration: 2021–2023, 2026–present
- First appearance: Episode 10,321; 10 May 2021
- Introduced by: Iain MacLeod
In-universe information
- Occupation: Detective Constable

DC Wiley, portrayed by Ashley Campbell, is a police officer who was initially appeared as part of a team investigating the attack on Nina Lucas (Mollie Gallagher) and Seb Franklin (Harry Visinoni). He first appeared on 10 May 2021. He ends up questioning Kelly Neelan (Millie Gibson) over her part in the attack. After his first episode aired, Campbell posted a photo outside the Rovers Return Inn on Instagram with the caption: "Felt a right loser doing this...but I'd have regretted not getting a selfie. Thanks for all the shout outs. Was amazing to be a tiny part of a heartbreaking storyline. Hate crime has to STOP! Based on the real life murder of Sophie Lancaster. Congratulations on continuously shining a light on these subjects." He later appears when James Bailey (Nathan Graham) makes a complaint against PC Brody (Daniel Jillings) for racial stereotyping. He also investigates into the death of Imran Habeeb (Charlie De Melo) and interviewed Max Turner (Paddy Bever) after far-right extremist Griff Reynolds (Michael Condron) planted a bomb inside a van parked outside of Speed Daal.

On 13 February 2026, it was announced that Campbell would be returning for a few episodes. He returned on a flash-forward episode set in April 2026, which aired on 16 February 2026 where Betsy Swain (Sydney Martin) is being interviewed by Wiley after discovering a dead body. Coronation Street producer Kate Brooks revealed that the "very complicated, very intricate" storyline was one of the biggest during her tenure. She continued: "It's our big thriller-esque story as we go into spring and early summer," she said. "It will involve an awful lot of the community. I don't think I've ever told a story that involves quite as many character groups. It's everyone – everyone's impacted and affected by the story."

== Glory Bailey ==
Glory Bailey
- Coronation Street character
- Portrayed by: Kamiyah Brown (2021); Eleanor Beckles (2021–2023); Mayia M (2024–present)
- Duration: 2021–present
- First appearance: Episode 10,325/6; 14 May 2021
- Introduced by: Iain MacLeod
In-universe information
- Father: Michael Bailey
- Mother: Grace Vickers
- Grandfathers: Ed Bailey
- Grandmothers: Aggie Bailey
- Uncles: James Bailey
- Aunts: Dee Dee Bailey
- First cousins: Laila Bailey
- Other relatives: Sarge Bailey; Ronnie Bailey

Glory Bailey, played by Mayia M (previously Eleanor Beckles), is the daughter of Grace Vickers (Kate Spencer) and Michael Bailey (Ryan Russell). She first appeared on 14 May 2021. She was born on 17 March 2021. Her birth was a delight for Michael; however, Grace rejects her and begins to start blackmailing Michael's parents Ed Bailey (Trevor Michael Georges) and Aggie Bailey (Lorna Laidlaw) into giving her a furnished home in order to remain in Glory's life, but this eventually fails when Michael finds out, and she leaves Glory lives with her father, aunt Dee Dee Bailey (Channique Sterling-Brown) and grandparents at their house, No. 3 Coronation Street.

On 22 December 2023, Eleanor Beckles, who played Glory for two years, made her final appearance and the role was recast to Mayia M in November 2024. James Rodger from BirminghamLive reported that Glory reappeared after "quietly being recast." Mayia attended The Drama MOB, a drama academy set up by Tina O'Brien, who plays Sarah Platt, who posted on Instagram: "Welcome to Coronation Street Maiya! Who caught our beautiful Maiya last night making her debut as ‘Glory Bailey’? Maiya’s first episode just happened to fall on her 4th birthday, so it was a double celebration! Maiya started filming for the role a few months ago and took over from Eleanor - another little Drama MOB star!" They continued: "We cannot wait to see more of Maiya on our screens, Maiya joins a long list of Drama MOB stars playing roles on Coronation Street and we couldn’t be prouder."

== Curtis Delamere ==
Curtis Delamere
- Coronation Street character
- Portrayed by: Sam Retford
- First appearance: Episode 10,333; 24 May 2021
- Last appearance: Episode 10,524; 31 December 2021
- Introduced by: Iain MacLeod
In-universe information
- Occupation: Student; Waiter
- Father: Neville Delamere
- First cousins: Ann Harrison

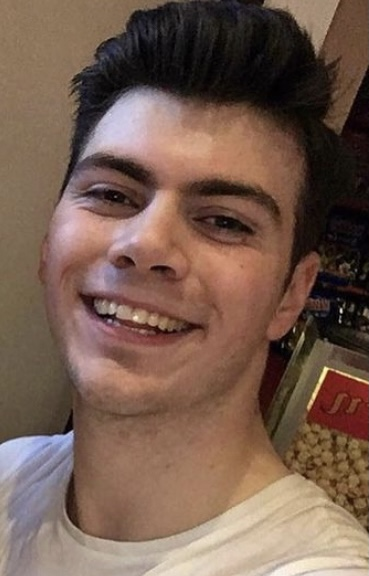
Sam Retford portrays Curtis.

Curtis Delamere, played by Sam Retford, made his first appearance on 24 May 2021. Curtis was introduced as a love interest for Emma Brooker (Alexandra Mardell) when the pair meet while she is working a shift in the Rovers Return Inn. Susannah Alexander, writing for Digital Spy, stated that he will bring "some excitement and potentially romance" to Emma's life. Calli Kitson of the Metro described Curtis as a "good-looking young man" who offers to help Emma move barrels of alcohol into the pub's cellar. The pair share a drink, but Emma's father Steve McDonald (Simon Gregson) is unhappy to find them as he deems Curtis a "hooligan" since he knocked Steve from his bike in a charity bike race. Curtis knocking Steve from his bike led him to come last in the race, so he initially holds a grudge against Curtis.

Steve tries to make amends with Curtis by giving him pointers for his forthcoming interview at the Bistro. Steve and Emma help Curtis by giving him a mock interview, where he informs them that he is also training to become a doctor, which causes Emma to "swoon" and leaves Steve "impressed." He gets the job and thanks the pair for their help. Kate White of Inside Soap wrote that "sparks fly" between Curtis and Emma, and stated that there is "potential for romance" between the pair. White also confirmed that since Curtis had gotten the job at the Bistro, Emma and her family would be seeing "a lot more of Curtis," and pondered if the new relationship could be the "start of something special."

Retford was driving along the M60 motorway with his car strapped full of school lockers when his manager called him. They explained to the actor that the producers wanted him to portray Curtis, which left him feeling "very happy" for the rest of the journey. Retford described his character as determined, hardworking, nice and curious. He said that he has never played a character like Curtis before, who Retford finds to be nervous and has "a lot to learn, and a lot to offer." The actor liked that his character is different to previous roles, since he enjoyed playing a character who is happy and is enjoying life. On Curtis' budding relationship with Emma, Retford explained that his character sees a fresh start in her, which excites him.

Curtis and Emma's relationship bloomed into a marriage proposal under the pretense that Curtis was terminally ill. However, Curtis' infliction was in fact factitious disorder, meaning that as a result of his mental illness, he was lying to Emma about him dying, when there was in fact no threat to his physical health. Although Emma initially agreed to still marry Curtis and forgive him for his lies under the condition that he was honest with everyone moving forwards, the couple split once Emma saw Curtis telling hospital staff that he was dying, and the two would not be legally wed, leading to Curtis' departure from the show.

== Fergus Dunford ==
Fergus Dunford
- Coronation Street character
- Portrayed by: Toby Hadoke
- First appearance: Episode 10,368; 5 July 2021
- Last appearance: Episode 10,471; 1 November 2021
- Introduced by: Iain MacLeod
In-universe information
- Occupation: Traffic Warden

Fergus Dunford, played by Toby Hadoke, was a traffic warden who appeared between July and November. He was also a friend and neighbour of Izzy Armstrong (Cherylee Houston). Hadoke is the off-screen partner of Houston. Hadoke was introduced as part of a "big story" for Izzy, who has a disability and is struggling with her job through the COVID-19 pandemic. Producer Iain MacLeod has emphasised the importance of portraying the experiences of disabled workers, especially in a programme where the Underworld factory plays a big part: "We had to think outside the box in order to tell this story, devising new protocols and ways of scripting scenes that would allow Cherylee to film the scenes herself in her home. It certainly helped that her partner Toby is a fabulous actor."

Fergus' storylines included supporting Izzy through Covid, such as when her samples needed to meet deadlines at work, he encouraged her to ask for more time. Something which later caused her to quit her position at Underworld, but later ask for her job back with Fergus' support. Furthermore, when working as a parking attendant, he gives Sally Metcalfe (Sally Dynevor) a parking ticket which leads to an argument between the pair; however, he ended up giving her short shrift after thinking she was bribing him out of it by offering to buy him a white wine.

== Phill Whittaker ==
Phill Whittaker
- Coronation Street character
- Portrayed by: Jamie Kenna
- Duration: 2021–2022
- First appearance: Episode 10,378/9; 16 July 2021
- Last appearance: Episode 10,699/700; 25 July 2022
- Introduced by: Iain MacLeod
In-universe information
- Mother: Mimi Halliday
- Wife: Camilla Perrin (backstory); Fiz Stape (2022)

Phill Whittaker, played by Jamie Kenna, is the ex-husband of Fiz Stape (Jennie McAlpine), who she met when he was a customer at Gary Windass' (Mikey North) furniture store. He overhears her arguing with her ex-partner Tyrone Dobbs (Alan Halsall). After flirting, the pair decide to go on a date. While on the date, Phill notices Tyrone's card gets declined at the restaurant and pays for it in secret, which causes Tyrone to punch him. Phill and Fiz's relationship continues for another year. They end up getting engaged, buying a house together and moving away from the street; however, their relationship suffers a few setbacks, such as Fiz's daughter Hope Stape's (Isabella Flannagan) behaviour, including exchanging false emails, with Phill's ex-wife Camilla Perrin (Louise Marwood), just before the couple are about to get married. The wedding does go ahead; however, after the reception, Fiz leaves him to go back to Tyrone. A few weeks later, Phill departs.

== Leo Thompkins ==
Leo Thompkins
- Coronation Street character
- Portrayed by: Joe Frost
- Duration: 2021–2023
- First appearance: Episode 10,441; 27 September 2021
- Last appearance: Episode 10,901; 2 March 2023
- Introduced by: Iain MacLeod
In-universe information
- Occupation: Construction worker
- Father: Teddy Thompkins

Leo Thompkins, played by Joe Frost, made his first appearance on 27 September 2021. Leo is introduced as a construction worker who is employed to perform structural work on the Platt family's garden. His storylines then see him "quickly become wrapped up in what's happening on the street and [meeting] more people." Frost described his character as a "salt of the earth bloke" who is hardworking and cares about the people around him. Frost did not know much about the character prior to securing the role, but had an interest in enriching his backstory and how he deals with people. Frost had watched Coronation Street for years prior to being cast and noted that his family are big fans of the soap; he felt that "the stars aligned" when he was cast as Leo. Frost found his first scene to be overwhelming, which he accredited to working with Helen Worth and Jack P. Shepherd. He was also grateful to Sally Ann Matthews and Charlotte Jordan for taking him "under their wing and giving Frost a "brilliant crash course in Corrie."

Jenny Connor (Matthews) introduces Leo to her stepdaughter Daisy Midgeley (Jordan) as a potential date, but Leo takes an interest in Jenny instead. He overhears Jenny state that she does not want to pursue more relationships, which leaves Leo feeling gutted, but Frost stated that his character is a "no-nonsense guy" who knows what he wants. Frost explained that Leo is interested in Jenny due to her outgoing personality, which he felt goes well with Leo's simple and grounded personality. He added that they would be a good match due to Leo being able to be there for Jenny.

On 26 September 2022, Leo was killed by Stephen Reid (Todd Boyce) after confronting him about his attempt to scam his mother Audrey Roberts (Sue Nicholls). After the two shove each other on top of the balcony of Underworld, Leo's mobile phone falls on the ground and as he attempts to retrieve it Stephen slams Leo's head into the railings, stunning him and pushes him off the balcony into a wheelie bin. After concealing the body from Sarah Barlow (Tina O'Brien), Carla Barlow (Alison King) and later, the police, Stephen puts Leo's corpse into the back of a van. He then steals Leo's luggage and passport from the Rovers, leading Jenny to believe he had gone to Canada without her. Later Stephen burns Leo's passport on wasteland.

== Orla Crawshaw ==
Orla Crawshaw
- Coronation Street character
- Portrayed by: Carla Mendonça
- Duration: 2021–present
- First appearance: Episode 10,440; 27 September 2021
- Introduced by: Iain MacLeod
In-universe information
- Occupation: Deputy Headteacher

Orla Crawshaw, portrayed by Carla Mendonça, is the deputy headteacher of Weatherfield High who appears on a recurring basis and deals with incidents between 27 September 2021 and 24 November 2022, regarding student Max Turner (Paddy Bever) and teacher Daniel Osbourne (Rob Mallard). She also deals with complaints against sexual harassment and upskirting made by Amy Barlow (Elle Mulvaney) and Summer Spellman (Harriet Bibby) and Amy's spiking, who is later revealed to be done by Max, who is subsequently expelled. Crawshaw returned on 20 November 2023 as part of the Mason Radcliffe (Luca Toolan) bullying storyline, when he framed Liam Connor Jr (Charlie Wrenshall) for stealing Dylan Wilson (Liam Cheyene)'s trainers, which he in fact made Dylan give to him. Crawshaw made further returns throughout this storyline, in October 2024, and July 2025.

When Mendonça made her first appearance, fans immediately recognised her as Olivia Wheeler reported to OK! that "eagle-eyed soap watchers were left distracted during the scenes as they instantly recognised Orla Crawshaw star Carla Mendonça from My Parents Are Aliens."

== Tez Wyatt ==
Tez Wyatt
- Coronation Street character
- Portrayed by: Stephen Lord
- First appearance: Episode 10,449; 6 October 2021
- Last appearance: Episode 10,488; 22 November 2021
- Introduced by: Iain MacLeod
In-universe information
- Occupation: Drug Dealer
- Sons: Seb Franklin

Terence "Tez" Wyatt, played by Stephen Lord, is the ex-boyfriend Abi Webster (Sally Carman) and the father of her son Seb Franklin (Harry Visinoni), whom she contacts following his brutal murder. Lord's casting was announced on 10 September 2021, and was confirmed by Carmen, who described Tez's character to be a "wrong'un." Abi had previously been in a relationship with Tez twenty years before his arrival in Coronation Street, resulting in her falling pregnant with Seb, but after his birth the couple separated and Abi raised him alone, later leading her to drinking and taking drugs.

In May 2021, Seb was murdered by Corey Brent (Maximus Evans) in an unprovoked attack, and after he was acquitted in court, Abi took justice into her own hands and obtained a handgun from Tez for £2,000 withdrawn from her and her husband Kevin Webster (Michael Le Vell)'s joint bank account, with the intent to shoot Corey. Whilst seeking Tez, she lied to Kevin about her whereabouts by saying she was visiting her cousin Owain in Doncaster. However, the handgun ended up in the hands of Harvey Gaskell (Will Mellor), who ended up shooting and killing Natasha Blakeman (Rachel Leskovac) with it, mistaking her for Leanne Battersby (Jane Danson).

Carmen described the relationship between Abi and Tez: "It was good because the audience are left with no doubt that Abi doesn't like him and has no time for him, but she simply knows he can help her with something that isn't emotional. In the scenes that I have done so far, he's trying to worm his way in and she's like, 'Do one'." She continued to describe how his arrival impacts her character: "I love when Corrie starts bringing different characters in, it's awesome. It pads out Abi even more, and I love it." Carmen also described that there were meant to be more scenes between Abi and Tez, but weren't filmed due to unforeseeable circumstances: "There were more scenes we were meant to do together – with me and Stephen Lord, who plays him, but because I got ill, they were re-written." Lord's introduction as Tez is set to be part of a "cinematic" disaster that is in celebration of the end of the COVID-19 pandemic, according to executive producer, Iain MacLeod. MacLeod also revealed that Coronation Street is "going to stage a disaster so massive it will rival the tram crash which rocked Weatherfield in 2010 – leaving one regular dead." Carmen also revealed at the National TV Awards: "It's going to be so big it will rival the tram crash. You're going to have your socks blown off."

== Stu Carpenter ==
Stu Carpenter
- Coronation Street character
- Portrayed by: Bill Fellows
- Duration: 2021–2024
- First appearance: Episode 10,449; 6 October 2021
- Last appearance: Episode 11,385; 14 October 2024
- Introduced by: Iain Macleod
In-universe information
- Occupation: Chef
- Wife: Lucy Woodrow (backstory)
- Daughters: Bridget Woodrow
- Granddaughters: Eliza Woodrow

Stu Carpenter, played by Bill Fellows, made his first appearance on the 6 October 2021. Stu was introduced as a homeless man who Corey Brent (Maximus Evans) gives his backpack to following his murder of Seb Franklin (Harry Visinoni). Nina Lucas (Mollie Gallagher) and Asha Alahan (Tanisha Gorey) ask him about the backpack and he later gives them bloodstained clothing from the backpack belonging to Corey, which allows Corey to be charged with Seb's murder. He tells this proudly to Kelly Neelan (Millie Gibson), who he finds to be homeless, unaware that she had an involvement in the murder. He encounters Yasmeen Metcalfe (Shelley King), who contributed heavily to a local soup kitchen and also offers Stu a job as a chef in Speed Daal. However, one day when Stu was at Speed Daal, Zeedan Nazir (Qasim Akhtar) unaware Stu was in the building, allowed his brothers-in-law in to start a fire in the restaurant as part of an insurance scam imposed by his blackmailing and threatening father-in-law Hashim Elamin (Vincent Ebrahim). Stu attempted to put the fire out, but was overcome by the smoke and left unconscious. He was rescued by Zeedan, but remained in critical condition in Weatherfield General Hospital. For a time, Stu was the prime suspect for starting the fire, albeit accidentally, though he swore he was innocent of the charge. When Hashim died suddenly of a heart attack, Zeedan was able to point the finger of blame at Hashim and Stu was exonerated. Yasmeen, who had strongly believed Stu was guilty, felt beholden to him for her mistrust and offered him a room at 6 Coronation Street.

In July 2022, he decided to reach out to his daughter Bridget Woodrow (Beth Vyse) again after having no contact since his imprisonment but she turned him away. When Yasmeen stepped in to defend Stu, Stu's ex-wife Lucy Woodrow (Lynda Rooke) informed her about his conviction; however, Stu reveals that he was innocent, so Stu, Zeedan and Alya Nazir (Sair Khan) decide to reopen the case, until the 14 October when Bridget confesses to Stu that it was in fact her that committed the murder and her mother helped her cover it up and frame Stu. After she confesses, Stu decides not to go to the police; however, once Alya had enough evidence to convict Bridget and Lucy, she reported them to the police, and both Bridget and Lucy were arrested for perverting the cause of justice and murder respectively and Eliza Woodrow (Savannah Kunyo) was placed in care until an assessment could be made on Stu after which she began living with him and Yasmeen. Regarding the storyline, Fellows told The Mirror: "There are loads of twists and turns. Obviously people are guessing what's gonna go on, but there is so many permutations. No one wins and there are loads of people who get affected by this, and none of it has a happy ending in the end. It's quite tricky."

In August 2023, Eliza's father, Dom Everett (Darren Morfitt) re-entered her life and wanted to gain custody, leading to a custody battle between him and Stu. However, Eliza wanted to live with her father, causing Stu to feel upset. He phoned Bridget in prison, who was against Dom having contact with Eliza, due to him not being involved or interested in her beforehand. Stu hires a private detective to find out information about Dom, but this went against Yasmeen's wishes. In March 2024, Eliza ended up moving to Germany with Dom, so she could meet her half-brother, Ben. Fellows commented on the storyline regarding the custody battle between Stu and Dom: "Eliza gets upset over wanting to live with Dom and she basically disappears, so Stu wakes up the next morning and she's gone. Stu thinks Dom has come and taken her but it's not true, she's actually freely gone to Dom, it leads to a big confrontation between them and Dom is basically like, if you're not gonna give me that money I'll make sure you suffer."

On 9 August 2024, it was announced that Fellows had quit the role of Stu after he decided not to renew his contract. Sam Warner from Digital Spy described Stu's character to be a "mainstay," and that Fellows "plans to move on to pursue other roles as his three-year contract comes to an end." Radio Times reported that Fellows is "ready to move on." The Sun reported that Stu would depart in an "explosive storyline," who also reported: "He will still be on screen for some time yet, but it gave him chance to say yes to a number of jobs he was keen to do later this year." Liverpool Echo reported that Fellows had already filmed his final scenes, which are due to air in October.

Stu departed Coronation Street on 14 October 2024 to move to Germany to live with Eliza. Fellows discussed his departure: "When I first started it was a six-month contract but with options that took me over three years. I am used to playing lots of different characters and three years seemed a long time to play the same character." Adding that he "needn't have worried," he said: "The three years have flown and this felt like the right time to go, I always knew I would go at the end of the three years." Fellows said that he has "no regrets at all" about his time on Corrie, explaining that "it is the right time to go for me and for Stu." He continued: "I will look back with fond memories and I wouldn't rule out coming back in the future. But Stu has evolved, we started off with a homeless guy who was wrongly accused of murder and then we get to the point three years later where this guy's got almost a quarter of a million pounds and has cleared his name and made a life for himself. I'm really pleased with the story, because it's been fully, fully formed." Speaking about Stu's final weeks in Weatherfield, Fellows revealed that he has been pleased to see Stu coming "full circle" by trying to help Mason make a fresh start after his prison stint: "I was glad that we have revisited the original Stu and his history," he said, recalling Stu's introduction in 2021 as an ally for Kelly Neelan when she was briefly homeless after leaving prison. Now he is trying to help someone else who he believes should be given a second chance," he added. "So we have come full circle. He believes that people should have a chance to redeem themselves, he wouldn't write someone off because they have been in prison." The actor added that the door is being left open for a potential return for his character in the future, saying that "it is good to know that Stu is out there somewhere helping people."

Fellows also revealed that he almost played an entirely different Corrie character before landing the role of Stu: "I auditioned for the role of Roy's brother, Nina's dad, before I got the role of Stu," he said. "I wasn't right for the part but it was for three weeks so it was fate really, because I got this part and stayed three years. I am so proud to have been in Corrie."

== Hashim Elamin ==
Hashim Elamin
- Coronation Street character
- Portrayed by: Vincent Ebrahim
- First appearance: Episode 10,450; 8 October 2021
- Last appearance: Episode 10,505; 10 December 2021
- Introduced by: Iain MacLeod
In-universe information
- Occupation: Restaurateur
- Daughters: Marrium Nazir

Hashim Elamin, played by comedian Vincent Ebrahim, is the father-in-law of Zeedan Nazir (Qasim Akhtar) who orders a beating for Zeedan for leaving his daughter, Marrium (Kiran Landa), whom he married between his two stints in the programme. Ebraham's casting was announced on 29 September 2021, and would be arriving in Coronation Street to "issue some demands." He made his first appearance on 10 October 2021. Not much had been revealed about Hashim's character, apart from that "he is out to get Zeedan for cheating on his daughter." Hashim and his family are "wanting revenge, having taunted Zeedan and beaten him up, as well as threatening to kill him."

When Zeedan returned to Weatherfield in September, he gave £50,000 towards saving his family's business, Speed Daal; however, it was later revealed that he stole it from Hashim, who had threatened to kill him for cheating on Marrium. When it is revealed that Zeedan stole the £50,000 from Hashim, he demands that he launders his money through Speed Daal, threatening to harm Zeedan's family if he does not comply. After the plan fails, Hashim visits Zeedan and his sister Alya Nazir (Sair Khan). After threatening them, Hashim has a heart attack and dies after Zeedan and Alya deliberately delay calling for help.

== Isla Haywood ==
Isla Haywood
- Coronation Street character
- Portrayed by: Gemma Oaten
- First appearance: Episode 10,480; 10 November 2021
- Last appearance: Episode 10,482/3; 16 November 2021
- Introduced by: Iain MacLeod
In-universe information
- Husband: Tony Haywood
- Daughters: Darcy Haywood

Isla Haywood, played by Gemma Oaten, is the mother of Hope Stape (Isabella Flanagan)'s classmate Darcy Haywood (Lilly-Rose Doyle) who goes on a date with Hope's stepfather Tyrone Dobbs (Alan Halsall). Oaten's casting was announced on 25 October 2021 and described her character to be "feisty" and "‘I would say she is bold, I found her quite brave and courageous. She knows who she is and owns it.'" Oaten also described what drew Tyrone and Isla together. "‘There is a connection there, as you can tell Isla loves her daughter. She sees the in Tyrone, as the scenes develop, you get the sense of the fact that her partner isn’t a good dad. This is the moment she thinks: “This is what I crave!”'

Isla, however, has a husband unbeknownst to Tyrone and, when they are on their date, Isla's husband Tony Haywood (Greg Snowden) arrives to collect her and is horrified to discover that she had not been meeting with her friends as she told him and was instead cheating on him. Tyrone apologises although Tony then punches him in the face. Oaten also commented on the marriage dynamic between Isla and Tony and how Tyrone fits into the situation. "‘Isla tells Tyrone she liked being married, but [her husband Tony] was a pipe and slippers kind of bloke,’ continued Gemma. Then Tony comes in, and he ain’t pipe and slippers! Poor Tyrone is going: “who’s this?” Isla is in the middle. You can see a tinge of: “[Tony] is fighting for me, he wants me!”, but when Tyrone gets punched, she’s like: “Oh my god, what are you doing?!” and that’s where some of the actual realities of their relationship come out. Tony says you’re meant to be out with the girls, and she tells him: “I’m with the father of one of our daughter’s friends, who if you spent any time with, you’d know that.”'

== Lydia Chambers ==
Lydia Chambers
- Coronation Street character
- Portrayed by: Rebecca Ryan
- Duration: 2021–2022
- First appearance: Episode 10,504; 10 December 2021
- Last appearance: Episode 10,595; 23 March 2022
- Introduced by: Iain MacLeod
In-universe information
- Occupation: Personal assistant
- Sons: Finn Chambers

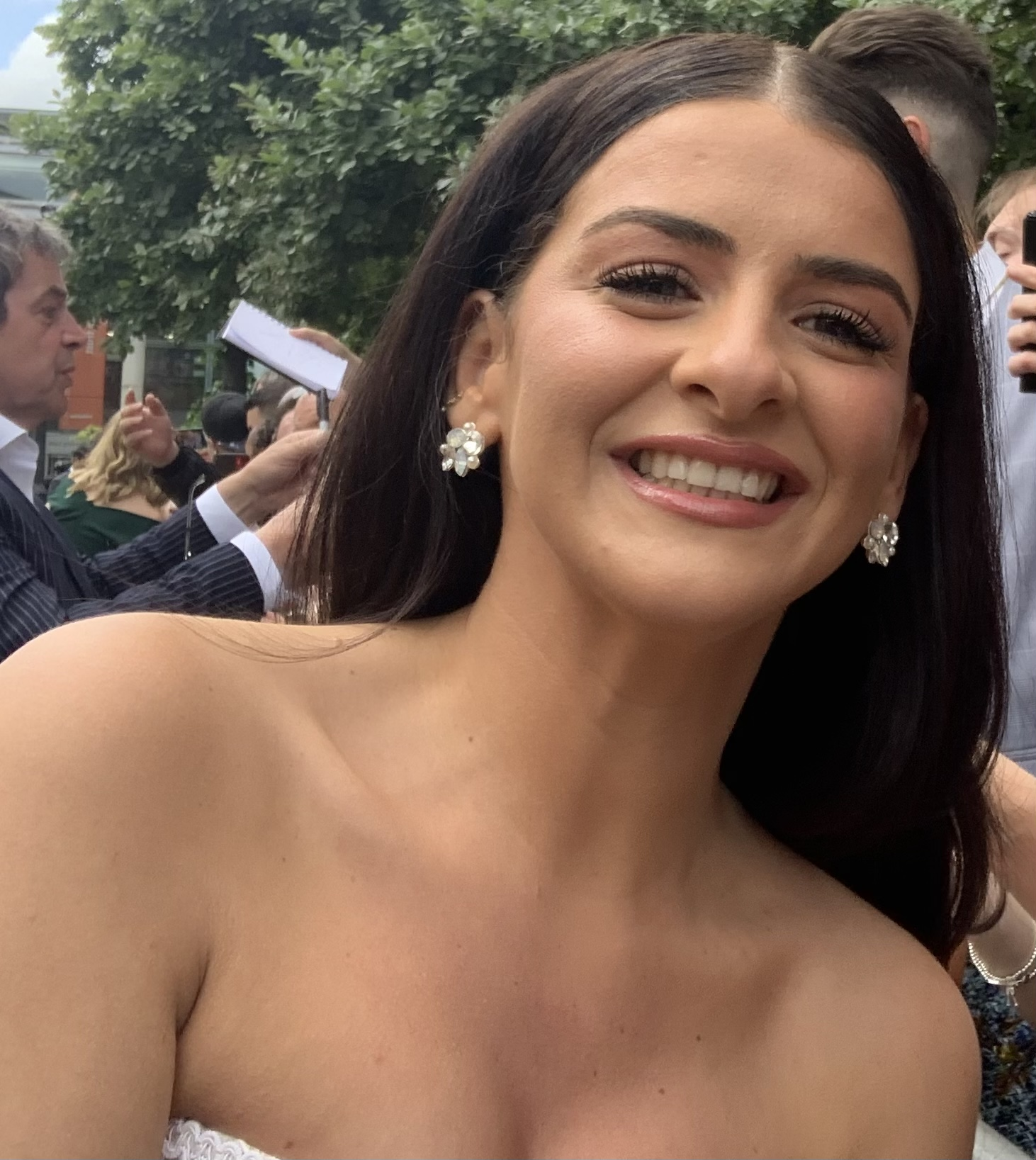
Rebecca Ryan portrays Lydia.

Lydia Chambers, played by Rebecca Ryan, made her first appearance on 10 December 2021. Lydia was introduced as a new personal assistant at Underworld factory. She attends a meeting with Sarah Platt (Tina O'Brien) and later befriends Sarah, who is horrified to realise that she has history with Sarah's husband Adam Barlow (Sam Robertson), whom she dated at university. A jealous Lydia eventually starts to harass the couple by breaking into their apartment and leaving gifts and threatening notes, but she is not suspected after Adam believes that it is a man who lost against his legal team in court. After weeks of sending herself text messages pretending to be Adam and making purchases on a forged credit card belonging to Adam, she tells Sarah that they had been having an affair. Sarah believes Lydia and kicks Adam out of their flat. When Adam tries to find out why she is doing this to him, she explains that she is getting revenge on him for treating her badly during their fling years prior to this. She also trashes her own flat whilst Adam is in the building which leads police to think that this was his doing. Adam is then arrested. In March, Adam and Lydia come to blows in a shopping centre. This leads to Lydia pushing Adam off the balcony, leaving Adam with potentially life-threatening injuries, including possible damage to his sight. Fortunately, Adam recovers safely and when Lydia is arrested, he lies and tells the police he fell, because he felt that it was payback for how he treated Lydia during their relationship. Lydia calls a truce with Adam before she leaves Weatherfield.

When Lydia begins to show her sinister side, viewers predicted that she would be similar to Emmerdale character Meena Jutla (Paige Sandhu), a serial killer. They felt that due to her "controlling" behaviour, her arc would follow the same route of Meena's, with her turning to murder. The Daily Mirror described Lydia as a bunny boiler and hinted that Sarah would become "the centre of a sinister plot, unable to know who to trust" due to Lydia's scheming. As Lydia's scheming increased, Ryan said that she was expecting a backlash from fans. She said that the negative fan reaction to a character is always scary for her, but appreciated the viewers enjoying the drama and taking the storyline seriously. Despite the backlash, Ryan felt that Lydia has a justified reason for her treatment of Adam, which she said viewers would hopefully understand too. She admitted that Lydia does go too far to get her point across, but felt that Lydia is not a bad person and does not want to "ruin lives for the sake of it." She added: "She's doing it because she has genuinely been broken and is potentially trying to save someone from going through what she went through."

Ryan was correct in her predictions as she noted that viewers of Coronation Street had shown a negative reaction to Lydia. She appeared on the ITV talk show Lorraine, where she joked that she is "quite hated at the minute" but said that she was taking the hatred as a compliment to her acting. She confirmed that Lydia would be exiting from the soap following the conclusion of her storyline with Adam and Sarah, but opined that Lydia could be redeemed. She explained: "hopefully people will start to see that and have a bit of sympathy for her and start to realise she's not a bad person at all, she's actually a nice person but has been hurt very badly. Hopefully, that will come across."

== Marrium Nazir ==
Marrium Nazir
- Coronation Street character
- Portrayed by: Kiran Landa
- Duration: 2021–2023
- First appearance: Episode 10,506; 13 December 2021
- Last appearance: Episode 10,880/1; 17 February 2023
- Introduced by: Iain MacLeod (2021, 2023)
In-universe information
- Father: Hashim Elamin
- Husband: Zeedan Nazir (2020-present)

Marrium Nazir (née Elamin), portrayed by Kiran Landa, is the estranged wife of Zeedan Nazir (Qasim Akhtar), who is shocked to see her arriving at Speed Daal following the fire, and the death of her father Hashim Elamin (Vincent Ebrahim). Zeedan lets Marrium stay at No.6 whilst she is sorting her father's affairs out, as much to the disgust of Alya Nazir (Sair Khan). The couple eventually reconcile and give their marriage another go. When Yasmeen Nazir (Shelley King) discovers the truth about how Hashim died, Zeedan tells Marrium that he did not want to be with her after all.

On 6 February 2023, it was reported that Marrium would be returning to the show, and she returned on 15 February to try to make another go at her marriage to Zeedan; however, she lives in London whereas he lives in Weatherfield. The two decide to give their marriage another try and they both go to London.

== Other characters ==
Character	Episode date(s)	Actor	Circumstances
Planning Officer	1 January	Joe Simpson	A planning officer that rules against Ray Crosby's (Mark Frost) planning developments due to Ray attempting to bribe him in his favour.
Chairperson	4–18 January	Alison George	A chairperson who oversees and accepts the planning permission that Ray Crosby (Mark Frost) applies for. Afterwards, Ray meets her for a drink.
Rhydian Chivers	22 January – 24 March	Haydn Holden	A senior salesman at Double Glammy, a cosmetics company that operates using a pyramid scheme. He recruits Gemma Winter (Dolly-Rose Campbell) and Sean Tully (Antony Cotton) into the scheme.
Crystal Webber	12–22 February	Ashley Hope Allan	A television psychic who is consulted by Leanne Battersby (Jane Danson) in an attempt to make contact with her dead son Oliver Battersby (Emmanuel and Jeremiah Cheetham).
Punter	15 March	Ali Gadema	A punter of Harvey Gaskell's (Will Mellor). Leanne Battersby (Jane Danson) is sent to his flat to deliver drugs to him.
Kat Bailey	17 March, 17 May	Melissa James	The estranged wife of Ronnie Bailey (Vinta Morgan). She arrives in Weatherfield to question his whereabouts.
Jimmi	26 March	Jonathon Ojinnaka	A man who Todd Grimshaw (Gareth Pierce) sets up with Paul Foreman (Peter Ash).
Wilf	28 April	Leslie Davidoff	A man who uses George Shuttleworth's (Tony Maudsley) funeral directors to give his wife a funeral. Todd Grimshaw (Gareth Pierce) uses his vulnerability to encourage him into buying the most expensive funeral package.
Martin	28 April	Damian Christian	Wilf's (Leslie Davidoff) son who berates Todd Grimshaw (Gareth Pierce) for using his father's vulnerability to encourage him into spending a lot of money on a funeral package. To stop him from telling the local newspapers, George Shuttleworth (Tony Maudsley) offers to do the service for free.
Heavy	30 April – 3 May	Steven Blades	A heavy of Harvey Gaskell's (Will Mellor) who Sharon Bentley (Tracie Bennett) orders to go to Weatherfield General Hospital to find Simon Barlow (Alex Bain) in order to stop Leanne Battersby (Jane Danson) from giving evidence against Harvey in court. When the plan fails, she orders the heavy to go their hiding place, who is shocked to find that they have moved into a different one.
Robbie	21 May – 1 June	Rick S. Carr	A friend of Harvey Gaskell (Will Mellor) who Sharon Bentley (Tracie Bennett) orders to kidnap Sam Blakeman (Jude Riordan). He later returns Sam and informs Nick Tilsley (Ben Price) that if Leanne Battersby (Jane Danson) and Simon Barlow (Alex Bain) testified against Harvey in court, he would harm Sam. After their plans are discovered, Robbie and Sharon make an attempt to escape. They are interrupted by Gary Windass (Mikey North) who steals the keys to Robbie's van and runs off with them. When he reaches a dead end, Robbie attempts to shoot him, but fails after Sam hits him around the head with a telescope case, leaving him unconscious. Robbie is then arrested, and Sharon manages to get away.
Consultant	14 June	Julie Lockey	A consultant who assesses Aled Winter-Brown to determine whether or not he should have a cochlear implant operation.
Noah	14 June	Jordan Akkaya	A friend of Daisy Midgeley (Charlotte Jordan).
Hughie	17 June	Colin Connor	A businessman from Ireland who is impressed by Nina Lucas (Mollie Gallagher). He takes her back to his hotel room, but they are stopped by Abi Franklin (Sally Carman) who tells Hughie to back off and takes Nina home.
Matt	17 June	Christopher Hampson	A sport agent who considers representing Corey Brent (Maximus Evans) as a footballer and meets him at a hotel to discuss it. When Nina Lucas (Mollie Gallagher), who is also at the hotel spots them, she lashes out at Corey for what he did to Seb Franklin (Harry Visinoni). After this, Matt changes his mind about representing Corey.
Rhys	20 June	Matt Concannon	One of Harvey Gaskell's (Will Mellor) thugs who shoots a gun towards Nick Tilsley (Ben Price) and Sam Blakeman (Jude Riordan) in a bid to warn Leanne Battersby (Jane Danson) not to give evidence against Harvey in court. Later that day, Sharon Bentley (Tracie Bennett) falls out with Harvey. He then orders Rhys to attack her, but she manages to get away from him.
Rupinder	21 June	Roya Amini	A recruit of Double Glammy who attends a seminar hosted by Sean Tully (Antony Cotton).
Judge	23–25 June	Sonia De La Moitié	The judge at Harvey Gaskell's (Will Mellor) trial.
Prosecution Barrister	23 June	Joyce Branagh	The barrister who leads the prosecution at Harvey Gaskell's (Will Mellor) trial.
Defence Barrister	23 June	Grant Gillespie	The barrister who leads the defence at Harvey Gaskell's (Will Mellor) trial.
Man	23 June	Oliver Ashworth	An acquaintance of Sharon Bentley (Tracie Bennett) who is delighted to hear that Sharon is taking over Harvey Gaskell's (Will Mellor) drug dealing business.
Danielle	23 June, 19 July, 6 December	Lucy Dixon	A woman who Emma Brooker (Alexandra Mardell) initially believes is seeing Curtis Delamere (Sam Retford) behind her back. When Steve McDonald (Simon Gregson) confronts him, he claims Danielle is a wine merchant from the Bistro he works at. When Steve fears that he is lying, he confronts him again and tells him to leave Emma. It is later discovered that Danielle is from a support group which is supporting Curtis due to an illness Curtis was supposedly suffering from.
Tonya	25 June	Claire Hackett	A therapist who tries to resolve the tension between Fiz Stape (Jennie McAlpine) and Tyrone Dobbs (Alan Halsall). The session fails after Fiz discovers Tyrone's new tattoo which has his and Alina Pop's (Ruxandra Porojnicu) initials and home countries together.
Mia	16 September – 8 November	Madeleine Edmondson	A prison inmate who shared a cell with Kelly Neelan (Millie Gibson).
Lou Breslin	13 October – 25 May 2022	Lucy Mizen	A social worker who communicates with Toyah Battersby (Georgia Taylor) and Imran Habeeb (Charlie De Melo) regarding numerous foster children. Whilst having a meeting regarding Elsie (Arabella Berkeley), Toyah exposes Imran's affair with Abi, and that he was the father of her baby.
Elsie	13 October – 11 April 2022	Arabella Berkeley	A child who is fostered by Toyah Battersby (Georgia Taylor) and Imran Habeeb (Charlie De Melo).
Cole	9–16 November	Tyler Dobbs	A teenager who is staying at the supported accommodation facility that Kelly Neelan (Millie Gibson) is staying at. He forces Kelly to steal Amy Barlow's (Elle Mulvaney) phone.
Penny Finton	10 November	Emma Stansfield	A parent who invites Ruby Dobbs (Macy Alabi) to her child's birthday party at Speed Daal. She annoys Tyrone Dobbs (Alan Halsall) by not inviting Hope Stape (Isabella Flanagan) after the fire she started at Alina Pop's (Ruxandra Porojnicu) flat earlier in the year.
Darcy Haywood	10 November	Lilly-Rae Doyle	A classmate of Hope Stape (Isabella Flanagan). Her mother Isla (Gemma Oaten) asks Hope's stepfather Tyrone Dobbs (Alan Halsall) to go on a date with her. Darcy and Hope are amused by this.
Tony Haywood	16 November	Greg Snowden	The father of Darcy Haywood (Lilly-Rose Doyle) and the husband of Isla Haywood (Gemma Oaten) who is shocked to find Isla on a date with Tyrone Dobbs (Alan Halsall). When Tyrone apologises, he punches him.
Clint Stubbins	29 November – 21 January 2022	Fergus O’Donnell	A friend of Bernie Winter (Jane Hazlegrove) who transports a sofa into her house which Grace Vickers (Kate Spencer) sold to her. When Joseph Brown (William Flanagan) goes missing, Clint finds him and convinces him to go back home by giving him and his cousin Hope Stape (Isabella Flanagan) £100 each, so he can pocket the £30,000 reward for finding him. Bernie later discovers Joseph with the £100 and confronts Clint, who confesses everything. Bernie initially didn't tell her family about Clint paying Joseph to return home as she was trying to make a deal with him.
Mimi Halliday	3 December – 8 July 2022	Margot Leicester	The mother of Phill Whitaker (Jamie Kenna) who upsets Fiz Stape (Jennie McAlpine) by being overbearing and rude. Eventually, Tyrone Dobbs (Alan Halsall) confronts Mimi about her behaviour and after discovering she was really called "Beryl." Everyone hears what is said and she then leaves Weatherfield. Mimi returned for Fiz and Phill's wedding, an invitation which she initially turned down.
Dr Handley	1 December – 28 March 2022	Geoffrey Newland	A Doctor who assesses Curtis Delamere (Sam Retford) and Tim Metcalfe (Joe Duttine). When Tim is visiting him, he learns that he needs a triple heart bypass.
Neville Delamere	1–31 December	Mark Cameron	The father of Curtis Delamere (Sam Retford). He questions Curtis' health, who states that he has a serious heart condition. Neville tells him that he knows Curtis is lying about his health and pleads him to tell his fiancé, Emma Brooker (Alexandra Mardell).
Finn Chambers	15 December	Joshua Leavy	The son of Lydia Chambers (Rebecca Ryan).
