= 24th National Television Awards =

British awards ceremony in 2019

- Date: 22 January 2019
- Location: The O2 Arena, London
- Country: United Kingdom
- Presented by: Dermot O'Leary; Dani Dyer and Jack Fincham (backstage)
- Most awards: Bodyguard, Britain's Got Talent, Emmerdale & I'm a Celebrity... Get Me Out of Here! (2)
- Most nominations: Britain's Got Talent, EastEnders, Emmerdale & The X Factor (4)
- Website: http://www.nationaltvawards.com/

Television/radio coverage
- Network: ITV

The 24th National Television Awards were held at The O2 Arena on 22 January 2019 and were the last to be hosted by Dermot O'Leary. Jack Fincham and Dani Dyer were on backstage duties. On 13 February 2019, O'Leary announced he was leaving the programme after nine years.

== Performances ==
- John Barrowman ("temporary replacement" for Dermot O'Leary during the opening number) – "Fabulous"
- Westlife – "Hello My Love"

== Awards ==
The full list of shortlisted nominations was announced on 7 January 2019.

Category Presenter(s)	Winner	Nominated
"Quiz Show"; Presented by Marvin Humes and Rochelle Humes	The Chase (ITV)	8 Out of 10 Cats Does Countdown (Channel 4); A League of Their Own (Sky One); Catchphrase (ITV); Pointless (BBC One)
"New Drama"; Presented by Matthew Morrison	Bodyguard (BBC One)	A Discovery of Witches (Sky One); Girlfriends (ITV); Killing Eve (BBC One); The Cry (BBC One)
"Talent Show"; Presented by Leomie Anderson	Strictly Come Dancing (BBC One)	Britain's Got Talent (ITV); Dancing on Ice (ITV); The Voice UK (ITV); The X Factor (ITV)
"Drama"; Presented by Emilia Fox	Peaky Blinders (BBC Two)	Call the Midwife (BBC One); Casualty (BBC One); Doctor Who (BBC One); Our Girl (BBC One)
"TV Presenter"; Presented by Ant Middleton	Ant & Dec	Graham Norton; Phillip Schofield; Holly Willoughby; Bradley Walsh
"Factual Entertainment"; Presented by Zoe Ball	Paul O'Grady: For the Love of Dogs (ITV)	Ambulance (BBC One); DIY SOS : The Big Build (BBC One); Gogglebox (Channel 4); The Great British Bake Off (Channel 4)
"Drama Performance"; Presented by Danny DeVito	Richard Madden (Sgt David Budd, Bodyguard - BBC One),	Cillian Murphy (Tommy Shelby, Peaky Blinders – BBC Two); Jodie Comer (Villanelle, Killing Eve – BBC One); Jodie Whittaker (The Doctor, Doctor Who – BBC One); Michelle Keegan (Georgie Lane, Our Girl – BBC One)
"The Bruce Forsyth Entertainment Award"; Presented by Stacey Dooley	I'm a Celebrity... Get Me Out of Here! (ITV)	All Round to Mrs. Brown's (BBC One); Ant & Dec's Saturday Night Takeaway (ITV); Love Island (ITV2); The Graham Norton Show (BBC One)
"Serial Drama"; Presented by Luke Goss and Matt Goss	Emmerdale (ITV)	Coronation Street (ITV); EastEnders (BBC One); Hollyoaks (Channel 4)
"Serial Drama Performance"; Presented by Lorraine Kelly	Danny Dyer (Mick Carter, EastEnders - BBC One)	Bonnie Langford (Carmel Kazemi, EastEnders – BBC One); Emma Atkins (Charity Dingle, Emmerdale – ITV); Jack P. Shepherd (David Platt, Coronation Street – ITV); Lucy Pargeter (Chas Dingle, Emmerdale – ITV)
"Comedy"; Presented by Freddie Flintoff and Paddy McGuinness	Peter Kay's Car Share (BBC One)	Jack Whitehall: Travels with My Father (Netflix); Benidorm (ITV); Mrs Brown's Boys (BBC One); The Big Bang Theory (E4/CBS)
"Newcomer"; Presented by Harry Redknapp and Jamie Redknapp	James Moore (Ryan Stocks, Emmerdale - ITV)	Aedan Duckworth (Oliver Morgan, Hollyoaks – Channel 4); Alexandra Mardell (Emma Brooker, Coronation Street – ITV); Neet Mohan (Rash Masum, Casualty – BBC One); Ricky Champ (Stuart Highway, EastEnders – BBC One)
"Daytime"; Presented by Ken and Lily from Old People's Home for 4 Year Olds	This Morning (ITV)	Good Morning Britain (ITV); Loose Women (ITV); Sunday Brunch (Channel 4); The Jeremy Kyle Show (ITV)
"TV Judge"; Presented by John Barrowman	David Walliams (Britain's Got Talent - ITV)	Louis Tomlinson (The X Factor – ITV); Robbie Williams (The X Factor – ITV); Robert Rinder (Judge Rinder – ITV); Simon Cowell (Britain's Got Talent & The X Factor – ITV)
"Special Recognition"; Presented by Dermot O'Leary	David Dimbleby	

== Programmes with multiple nominations ==
Programmes that received multiple nominations
Nominations	Programme
4	Britain's Got Talent
4	EastEnders
4	Emmerdale
4	The X Factor
3	Coronation Street
3	Dancing on Ice
3	This Morning
2	Ant & Dec's Saturday Night Takeaway
2	Bodyguard
2	Casualty
2	The Chase
2	Doctor Who
2	The Graham Norton Show
2	Hollyoaks
2	I'm a Celebrity... Get Me Out of Here!
2	Killing Eve
2	Our Girl
2	Peaky Blinders

Networks that received multiple nominations
Nominations	Network
31	ITV
25	BBC One
6	Channel 4
2	BBC Two
2	Sky One

== Programmes with multiple wins ==
Programmes that received multiple wins
Wins	Programme
2	Bodyguard
2	Britain's Got Talent
2	Emmerdale
2	I'm a Celebrity... Get Me Out of Here!

Networks that received multiple wins
Wins	Network
7	ITV
5	BBC One
