= Rebecca Ryan =

English actress (born 1991)

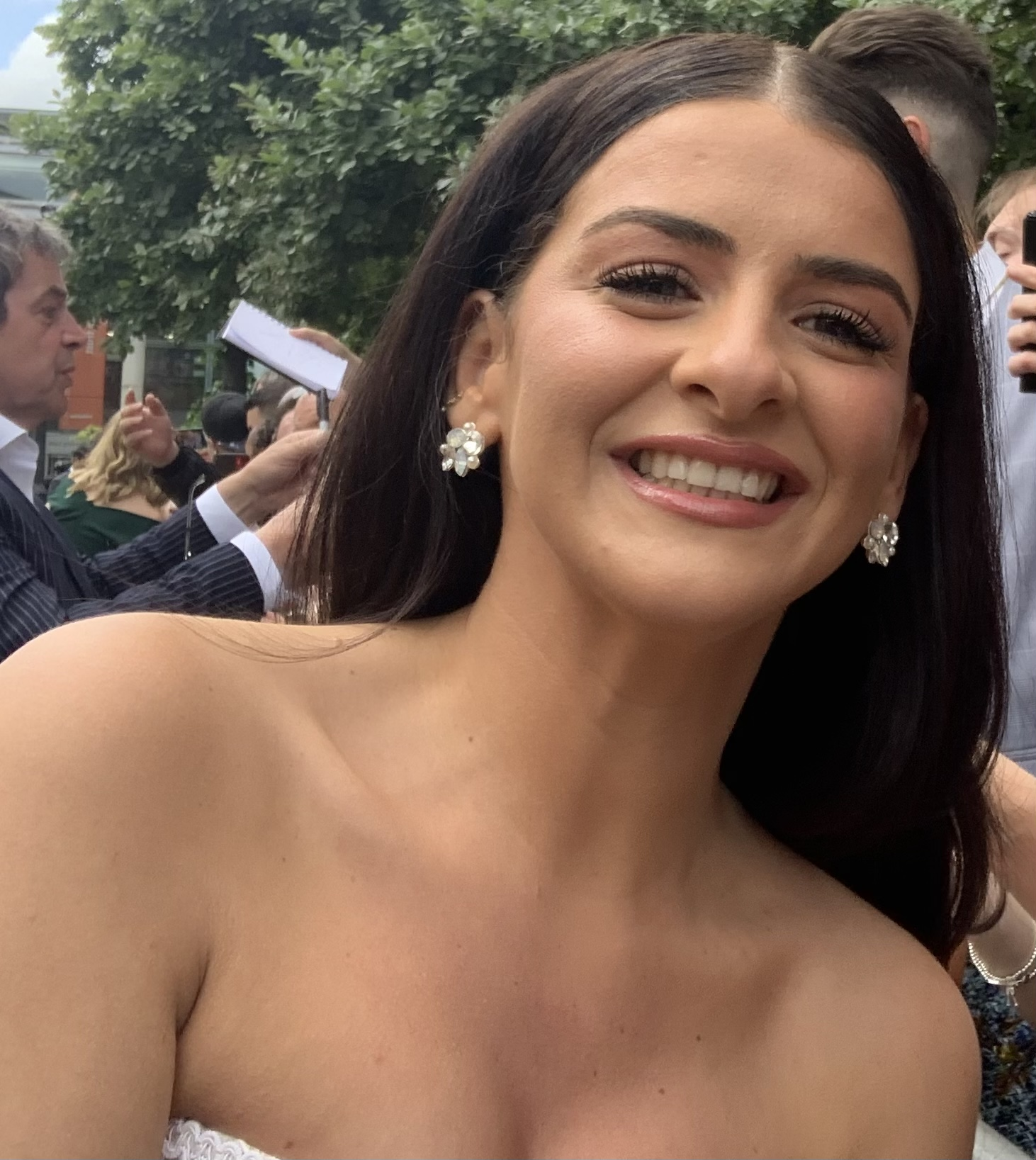
- Ryan at the British Soap Awards in 2022
- Born: 27 April 1991 (age 35); Manchester, England
- Occupation: Actress
- Years active: 1999–present
- Known for: Shameless; Waterloo Road; Casualty; Coronation Street
- Height: 1.55 m (5 ft 1 in)
- Spouse: Dan Acraman (m. 2022)
- Children: 2

Rebecca Ryan (born 27 April 1991) is a British actress from Manchester, England, best known for her role as Debbie Gallagher in the Channel 4 comedy-drama series Shameless (2004–2009). Ryan also appeared as Vicki MacDonald in the BBC One school-based drama series Waterloo Road (2009–2011), Gemma Dean in the BBC One medical drama Casualty (2017–2019) and from 2021 to 2022, she appeared in the ITV soap opera Coronation Street as Lydia Chambers. In 2026, she joined the cast of Channel 4 soap Hollyoaks as Beth Keane.

== Career ==
Ryan's Northern Irish mother Maranna was the first World Irish dancing champion. Inspired by her mother, Ryan took up Irish dancing lessons at age three, competed in numerous competitions and ranked third at age 12. Ryan first followed her brother, Charlie Ryan, onto the stage at the age of six in a production of The Who's Tommy at Manchester Opera House. Ryan then starred as Debbie Gallagher in Shameless, which she began playing at the age of 11. Though she never had any formal training as an actor, she credits the time spent on the set of Shameless as a useful learning experience.

Ryan has appeared in various television series, including State of Play, Holby City and the CBBC series, Stupid!. In February 2006, she appeared in Emmerdale playing Bob Hope's (Tony Audenshaw) daughter, Carly Hope. She also appeared on Celebrity Big Brother 6 as part of a task. Ryan made her stage debut in Scarborough by Fiona Evans at London's Royal Court Theatre in 2008, and subsequently appeared in "Lost Monsters" at the Everyman Theatre in Liverpool. From 2009 to 2011, she appeared as pupil Vicki MacDonald in BBC One school-based drama series Waterloo Road. In January 2010, she played the part of Ellie McCall in a special five-part storyline in BBC daytime soap opera Doctors. In February 2011, Ryan appeared in Let's Dance for Comic Relief, with fellow Waterloo Road cast member, Philip Martin Brown. In May 2011, she played Maeve Summers in an episode of Casualty. She has also appeared as Grace in Monroe (2012), Erin Doyle in an episode of DCI Banks (2014) and Natalie Dixon in Doctors (2015).

In May 2014, Ryan toured in the production of A Taste of Honey Derby Theatre. In February 2015, Ryan starred in the Derby Theatre's Solace of the Road playing the characters Holly and Solace. The Derby Telegraph reviewer, Susie Brighouse, said of her performance: "Rebecca Ryan perfects the complex art of acting by a subtle change of tone to clarify what Solace is thinking, as well as deftly changing between the personalities of Holly and Solace throughout the play." Alfred Hickling of The Guardian wrote: "It's hard to think of an actor more capable of veering between the ages of 12 and 27 at any given moment [than Ryan.]" Ryan featured in the second run of Beryl, written by fellow Shameless actress Maxine Peake, at the West Yorkshire Playhouse in June and July 2015, followed by an autumn 2015 tour around England. In 2017, Ryan began portraying hospital porter Gemma Dean in the BBC medical drama, Casualty. Ryan confirmed she had departed Casualty on 10 August 2019. In December 2021, she joined the cast of the ITV soap opera Coronation Street as Lydia Chambers. She confirmed that her exit would air in 2022 following the conclusion of Lydia's storyline.

== Personal life ==
Ryan married her partner Dan Acraman on 24 September 2022. Ryan gave birth to their first child, a daughter, in May 2023. In January 2025, she announced she is pregnant with her second child.

== Filmography ==
Year	Title	Role	Notes
2001	Kannibal	Victim 3	Film; credited as Becky Ryan
2002–2003	Harry and Cosh	Mary Loo	Recurring role; 14 episodes
2003	State of Play	Karen Collins	TV mini-series; 3 episodes
2004–2009	Shameless	Debbie Gallagher	Series regular; 65 episodes
2005	Holby City	Amy Carter	Episode: "Ostrich Mode"
2006	Casualty	Leah Crawford	Episode: "Sons and Lovers"
2007	Stupid!	Judith Bibble	Episode: "Judith"
2009	Casualty	Kat Ashton	Episode: "Hostile Takeover"
2009–2011	Waterloo Road	Vicki MacDonald	Series regular; 39 episodes
2010	Doctors	Ellie McCall	Recurring role; 5 episodes
2011	Let's Dance for Sport Relief	Vicki MacDonald	Series 3: Episode 1
2011	Casualty	Maeve Summers	Episode: "When the Bough Breaks"
2012	Monroe	Grace Bushnall	Series 2: Episode 5
2014	DCI Banks	Erin Doyle	Episode: "Bad Boy: Part 1"
2015	Doctors	Natalie Dixon	Episode: "The Kick Inside"
2017–2019	Casualty	Gemma Dean	Series regular; 53 episodes
2019	Holby City	Gemma Dean	Episode: "Powerless"
2020	Doctors	Leah Harrison	Episode: "Castles in the Air"
2021–2022	Coronation Street	Lydia Chambers	Series regular, 38 episodes
2025	Daddy Issues	Debs	1 episode
2026-present	Hollyoaks	Beth Keane	Series regular

== Awards and nominations ==
Year	Award	Category	Result	Ref.
2022	Inside Soap Awards	Best Villain	Nominated	
