= Jamie Kenna =

British actor

Jamie Kenna is a British actor and former semi-professional footballer, formerly of Rusthall FC.

He appeared in Stormbreaker as Fox, Green Street as Big Marc and EastEnders as Vince Franks. He also appeared in The Bill.

In August 2014, Kenna began his portrayal of Heck Tate in the stage production of To Kill a Mockingbird, which continued to tour the UK that September.

He appeared in two films, Clubbed and The Bank Job, and two upcoming television series, Stuart: A Life Backwards as well as The Last Enemy.

Kenna would become a recurring character in Coronation Street in 2021 and 2022, playing Phill Whittaker, the love interest and later husband of Fiz Stape.

Kenna also starred in the Gran Turismo movie.
