= Smoggie Queens =

British television sitcom (since 2024)

- Genre: Sitcom
- Created by: Phil Dunning
- Written by: Phil Dunning
- Directed by: Andrew Chaplin
- Starring: Phil Dunning; Mark Benton; Alexandra Mardell; Patsy Lowe; Elijah Young
- Country of origin: United Kingdom
- Original language: English
- No. of series: 2
- No. of episodes: 12

Production
- Executive producers: Jimmy Mulville; Jessica Sharkey; Gregor Sharp
- Producer: Chris Jones
- Running time: 28-29 mins
- Production company: Hat Trick Productions

Original release
- Network: BBC Three; BBC iPlayer
- Release: 28 November 2024 – present

Smoggie Queens is a British television sitcom created by Phil Dunning set in Middlesbrough focusing on the chosen family and lives of a group of LGBTQ friends. It premiered at Middlesbrough Town Hall and was first broadcast on BBC Three on 28 November 2024 and BBC iPlayer. Smoggie in the title is a demonym for people from Middlesbrough.

There are a number of cameos including Michelle Visage and Steph McGovern. The series is produced by Hat Trick Productions, and has funding support by North East Screen Industries Partnership delivered by North East Screen. The worldwide distribution is by Hat Trick International.

On 17 July 2026, the BBC announced that Smoggie Queens has been recommissioned for a third series.

== Cast and characters ==
=== Main cast ===
- Phil Dunning as Dickie
- Mark Benton as Mam
- Alexandra Mardell as Lucinda
- Elijah Young as Stewart
- Patsy Lowe as Sal

=== Supporting and guest characters ===
- Neil Grainger as Neil
- Michael Hodgson as Nan
- Charlotte Riley as Danni
- Monica Dolan as Paula (Series 2)
- Peter McPherson as Harrison
- Michael Mather as Bobby
- Lauryn Redding as Mel
- Bill Fellows as Keith
- Michelle Visage as Elaine
- Steph McGovern as herself
- David Kirkbride as Trev
- Mark Stobbart as Marcus
- Alison Ward as Moira
- Jeff Stelling as himself (Series 2)
- Chris Kamara as himself (Series 2)
- Melanie Hill as Vanessa (Series 2)
- Amalia Vitale as Linda (Series 2)
- Freya Parker as Arabella (Series 2)

== Episodes ==
=== Series overview ===
Series	Episodes	Originally released
1	6	28 November 2024
2	6	15 May 2026

=== Series 1 (2024) ===
No. overall	No. in series	Title	Directed by	Written by	Original release date
1	1	"A Smoggie Break-Up"	Tom Kingsley	Phil Dunning	28 November 2024
2	2	"A Smoggie Fairy Tale"	Andrew Chaplin	Phil Dunning	28 November 2024
3	3	"A Smoggie Feud"	Andrew Chaplin	Phil Dunning	28 November 2024
4	4	"A Smoggie Murder"	Andrew Chaplin	Phil Dunning	28 November 2024
5	5	"A Smoggie Birthday"	Andrew Chaplin	Phil Dunning	28 November 2024
6	6	"A Smoggie Pride"	Andrew Chaplin	Phil Dunning	28 November 2024

=== Series 2 (2026) ===
No. overall	No. in series	Title	Directed by	Written by	Original release date
7	1	"A Smoggie Search Party"	Tom Marshall	Phil Dunning	15 May 2026
8	2	"A Smoggie Date"	Tom Marshall	Phil Dunning	15 May 2026
9	3	"A Smoggie Social"	Tom Marshall	Phil Dunning	15 May 2026
10	4	"A Smoggie Match"	Tom Marshall	Phil Dunning	15 May 2026
11	5	"A Smoggie Pageant"	Tom Marshall	Phil Dunning	15 May 2026
12	6	"A Smoggie Show"	Tom Marshall	Phil Dunning	15 May 2026

== Reviews ==
Rachel Aroesti of The Guardian gave the series as 3 out of 5 stars "This series about a tight-knit queer community joyfully celebrates British camp culture – from deadpan humour to loving Lorraine Kelly. What a shame it’s not more funny."

Yvonne Wancke of North East Bylines said "I watched BBC's Smoggie Queens over the Christmas break and what a delight! It's funny, charming, delightful, and moving – all at once. The writing is awesome and the cast are truly splendid. A must watch in my opinion."

Nick Levine of The i Paper gave 4 out of 5 stars, saying "Smoggie Queens is a reminder that queer people form chosen families all over the country, not just in big cities like London and Manchester that are traditionally seen as more accepting. It might be packed with daft laughs, but it's also thoroughly comforting – no mean feat for a show that drops the word “gooch” in its opening scene."

== Awards ==
Year	Award	Category	Nominee	Result	Citation
2025	Royal Television Society RTS North East and the Border Awards	Comedy Award	Smoggie Queens	Won	
2025	Royal Television Society RTS North East and the Border Awards	Best Newcomer	Phil Dunning	Won	
2025	Comedy.co.uk Awards	Best New Sitcom	Smoggie Queens	Nominated	
2025	BAFTA TV Awards	Male Performance in a Comedy	Phil Dunning	Nominated	
2025	BAFTA Craft Awards	Comedy Writer	Phil Dunning	Nominated	
2025	BAFTA Craft Awards	Emerging Talent	Phil Dunning	Nominated	
2025	Broadcast Digital Awards	Best Comedy	Smoggie Queens	Won	
2026	Broadcast Awards	Best Comedy	Smoggie Queens	Nominated	
