= Sam Retford =

Australian actor (born 1999)

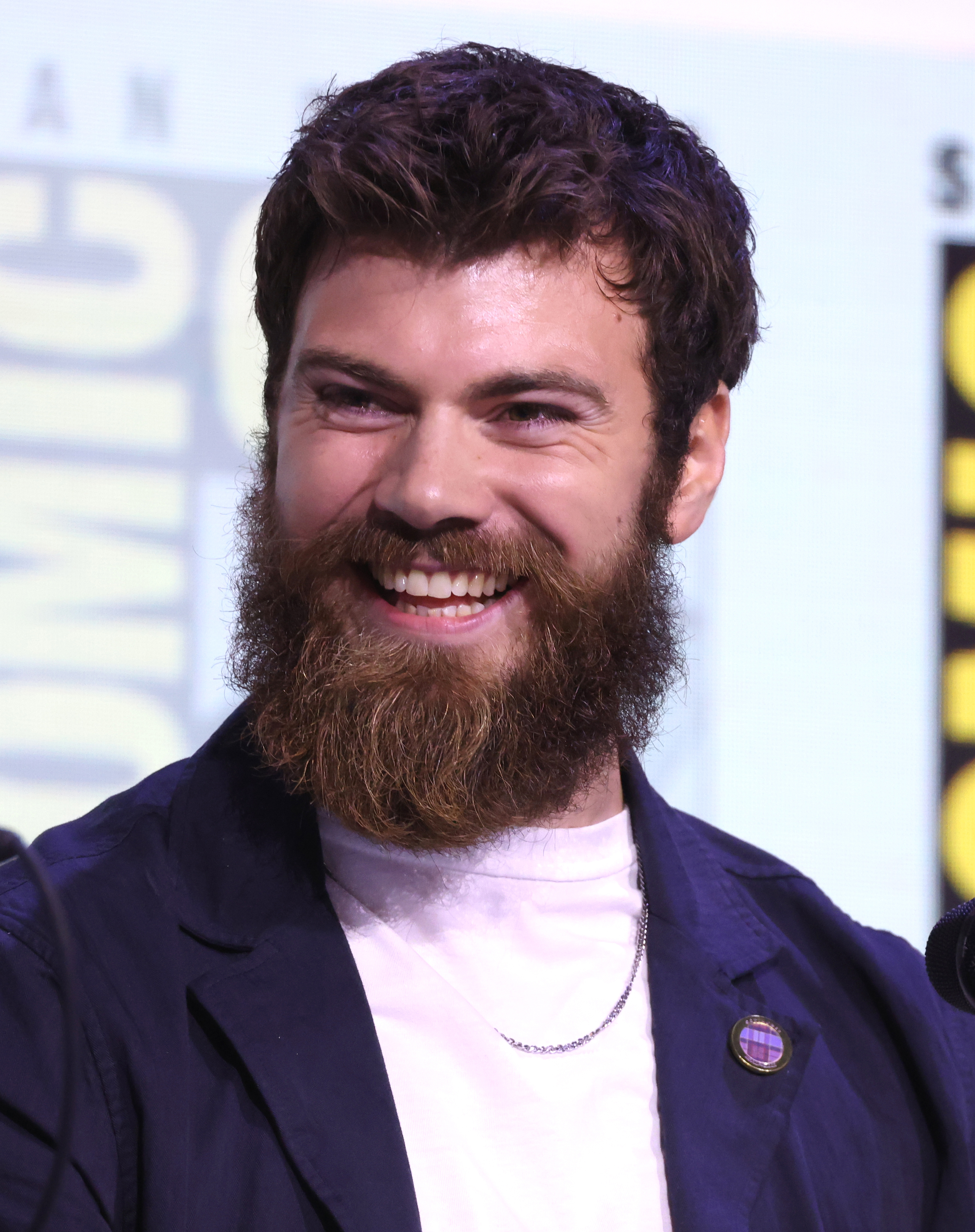
- Retford in 2025
- Born: 22 June 1999 (age 27); Gosford, New South Wales, Australia
- Education: Brine Leas High School; The Lowry Actors Company
- Occupation: Actor
- Years active: 2014–present

Sam Retford (born 22 June 1999) is an Australian actor, known for portraying the role of Cory Wilson on the Channel 4 drama Ackley Bridge (2017–2019). As well as starring in various stage productions, he has also made appearances in television series such as Casualty (2019) and Death in Paradise (2021). In 2021, he joined the cast of the ITV soap opera Coronation Street as Curtis Delamere.

== Early life ==
Retford was born on 22 June 1999 in Gosford, New South Wales, Australia. His family then relocated to Crewe, England. He attended Brine Leas High School, and later studied acting at The Lowry Actors Company. Before he began acting professionally, Retford aspired to be a marine biologist.

== Career ==
Retford began acting in fringe productions around the Manchester theatre scene, such as Lord of the Flies and The Newspaper Boy. He made his television debut in Hollyoaks: Tom's Life, a Hollyoaks spinoff series. The series premiered in 2014 on All 4, and Retford portrayed the role of Nate for four episodes.

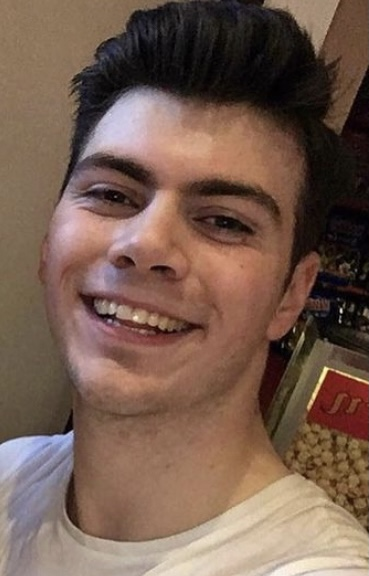
Retford in 2019

From 2017 to 2019, he portrayed the role of Cory Wilson in the Channel 4 school drama Ackley Bridge. His storylines in the series revolved around the subject of domestic abuse, coming to terms with his sexuality, and engaging in an illicit relationship with a teacher.

In August 2018, he co-starred in the musical Closets alongside Lloyd Daniels. In February 2019, Retford made his London theatre debut when he starred in Kings of Idle Land as Michael, at Vaults festival. Later that year, Retford appeared at Diana Award anti-bullying events in Blackpool and London. In December 2019, he portrayed the role of Tyler Begbie in an episode of the BBC medical drama Casualty.

In 2020, Retford starred in the short film S.A.M. Later that year, it was announced that he would appear in the tenth series of Death in Paradise.

In May 2021, Retford joined the cast of the ITV soap opera Coronation Street as Curtis Delamere. Later that year, he was cast in the musical film White Wedding as Hunter.

In February 2024, it was announced that Retford had been cast as Dougal MacKenzie in the Outlander prequel series Outlander: Blood of My Blood.

== Filmography ==
Year	Title	Role	Notes	Ref.
2014	Hollyoaks: Tom's Life	Nate	Main role	
2017–2019	Ackley Bridge	Cory Wilson	Main role	
2019	Casualty	Tyler Begbie	1 episode	
2020	Granada Reports	Himself	Guest	
2020	S.A.M	Sam	Short film	
2021	Death in Paradise	Joseph Verdinikov	2 episodes	
2021	Coronation Street	Curtis Delamere	Series regular	
2021	White Wedding	Hunter	Film	
2021	The Boleyns: A Scandalous Family	George Boleyn	Miniseries	
2022	Ralph & Katie	Gary	Recurring role	
2023	All Creatures Great and Small	FO Woodham	Episode: "On a Wing and a Prayer"	
2023	Hoard	Sean	Film	
2024	Grace	Jamie Brown	Episode: "You Are Dead"	
2025–present	Outlander: Blood of My Blood	Dougal MacKenzie	10 episodes	

== Stage ==
Year	Title	Role	Venue	Ref.
2014	The Wardrobe	George	National Theatre Connections	
2014	At Night	Jake	Royal Exchange	
2015	Lord of the Flies	Ralph	The Lowry	
2016	Henry V	Bardolph	Open Air Theatre	
2018	The Newspaper Boy	Max	53Two	
2018	Closets	Henry	Hope Mill Theatre	
2019	Kings of Idle Land	Michael	The Vault Theatre	
