= Lawson family murders =

1929 American familicide case

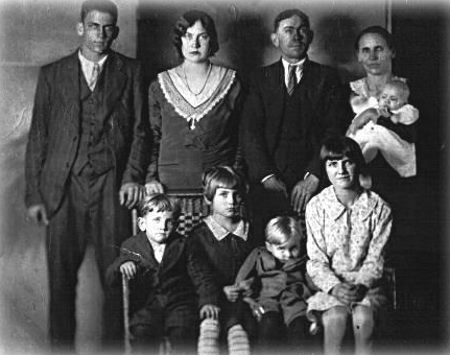
- Lawson family portrait. Left to right: (Top) Arthur (19), Marie (17), Charles (43), Fannie (37) holding baby Mary Lou; (Bottom) James (4), Maybell (7), Raymond (2), Carrie (12). Only Arthur survived.
- Location: 36.285°N 80.207°W; Germanton, North Carolina, U.S.
- Date: December 25, 1929; 96 years ago
- Attack type: Massacre; Murder-suicide; filicide; uxoricide
- Deaths: 8 (including the perpetrator)
- Perpetrator: Charles Davis Lawson

On December 25, 1929, sharecropper Charles Davis "Charlie" Lawson murdered his wife and six of his seven children in Germanton, North Carolina, United States.

The familicide has been subject to much speculation due to the unconfirmed motive, with the most commonly reported theory alleging an attempted cover-up of incestual abuse. The site of the Lawson family murders also became a popular dark tourism site, also inspiring several songs and stories.

== Background ==
In 1911, Charles Lawson married Fannie Manring, with whom he had eight children. The third, William, born in 1914, died of an illness in 1920. In 1918, following the move of his younger brothers Marion and Elijah to the Germanton area, Lawson followed suit with his family. The Lawsons worked as tenant tobacco farmers and, by 1927, had saved enough money to purchase their own farm on Brook Cove Road.

== Murders ==
In 1929, days prior to Christmas, Lawson (age 43) took his wife Fannie (age 37) and their seven children, Arthur (age 19), Marie (age 17), Carrie (age 12), Maybell (age 7), James (age 4), Raymond (age 2) and Mary Lou (age 4 months) into town to buy new clothes and to have a family portrait taken. This would have been an unusual occurrence for a working-class rural family of the era, which has led to speculations that Lawson's act was premeditated. However, Lawson having purchased his own farm two years previously, together with the fact that an Associated Press wire went out on the day after the murders characterizing Lawson as a "well-to-do farmer", could make a pre-Christmas shopping spree appear reasonable.

Posthumously it was speculated that he had impregnated his daughter Marie.

On the afternoon of December 25, Lawson first shot his daughters, Carrie and Maybell, as they were setting out to their uncle and aunt's house. He waited for them by the tobacco barn until they were in range, shot them with a 12-gauge shotgun, then ensured that they were dead by bludgeoning them. He placed the bodies in the tobacco barn.

Afterwards, Lawson returned to the house and shot Fannie, who was on the porch. As soon as the gun was fired, Marie, who was inside, screamed, while the two small boys, James and Raymond, attempted to find a hiding place. Lawson shot Marie, and then found and killed the two boys. Lastly, he killed the baby, Mary Lou; it is thought that she was bludgeoned to death. After the murders, he went into the nearby woods and, several hours later, shot himself. The only survivor was his eldest son, 19-year-old Arthur, whom he had sent on an errand just before committing the crime.

The bodies of the family members were found with their arms crossed and rocks under their heads. The gunshot signaling Lawson's own suicide was heard by the many people who already had learned of the murders on the property and gathered there. A police officer who was with Arthur ran down to discover Lawson's body along with letters to his parents. As footprints encircled the tree, it was supposed that he had been pacing around the tree prior to taking his life.

== Theories on motive ==
=== Charlie's head injury ===
Months before the event, Lawson had sustained a head injury; some family and friends theorized that it had altered his mental state and was related to the massacre. However, an autopsy and analysis of his brain at Johns Hopkins Hospital found no abnormalities.

=== Marie's rumored pregnancy by Charlie ===
It was not until the book White Christmas, Bloody Christmas was published in 1990 that a claim of Charlie sexually abusing Marie surfaced, beginning with an anonymous source who heard a rumor during a tour of the Lawson home shortly after the murders. The day before the book was to be published, the author received a phone call from Stella Lawson, a relative who had already been interviewed for the book. Stella said that she had overheard Fannie's sisters-in-law and aunts, including Stella's mother, Jettie Lawson, discussing how Fannie had confided in them that she had been concerned about an "incestuous relationship" between Charlie and Marie. Jettie died in early 1928, meaning Fannie had been suspicious of the incest at least that long before the murders in late 1929.

More support for this theory was revealed in The Meaning of our Tears, published by the same author in 2006. A close friend of Marie Lawson's, Ella May, came forward and disclosed that a few weeks before Christmas 1929, Marie confided in her that she was pregnant by her own father and that both he and Fannie knew about this. Many thought that this is what also led to him massacring his wife and children, because he did not want the secret to get out. Another close friend and neighbor to the Lawson family, Hill Hampton, stated that he knew of serious problems going on within the family, but declined to elaborate.

== Aftermath ==
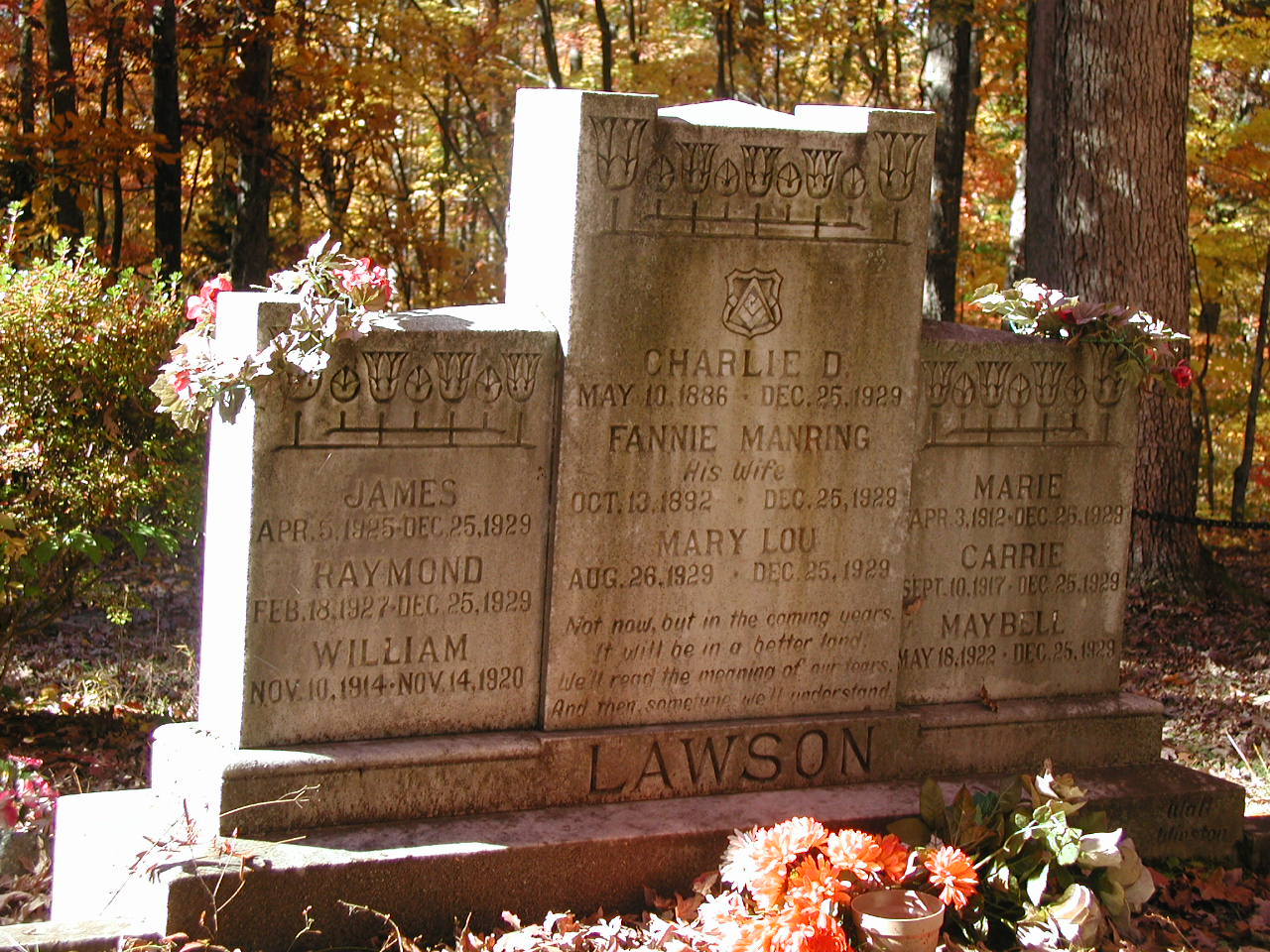
The family grave

Shortly after the murders, Charlie's brother, Marion Lawson, opened the home on Brook Cove Road as a tourist attraction. A cake that Marie had baked on Christmas Day was displayed on the tour. Because visitors began to pick at the raisins on the cake to take as souvenirs, it was placed in a covered glass cakeserver for many years.

The event inspired a number of songs and other tributes including the murder ballad "The Murder of the Lawson Family", which was originally recorded by the Carolina Buddies for Columbia Records in 1930 and covered by the Stanley Brothers in March 1956.

The case was also featured in an episode of the PRX podcast Criminal.

The Lawsons were laid to rest in a private family graveyard. Arthur Lawson was killed in a 1945 motor accident (age 31), leaving a wife and four children.

The Netflix series 28 Days Haunted (2022) shows the place where the victims were embalmed and describes what happened.

== See also ==
- Ronald Gene Simmons
