= Emma Brooker =

Fictional character from Coronation Street

- Coronation Street character
- Portrayed by: Alexandra Mardell
- Duration: 2018–2022
- First appearance: Episode 9,435; 20 April 2018
- Last appearance: Episode 10,447; 8 April 2022
- Introduced by: Kate Oates
In-universe information
- Occupation: Apprentice hairdresser Barmaid
- Father: Steve McDonald
- Mother: Fiona Middleton
- Stepfather: John Brooker
- Stepmother: Tracy Barlow
- Half-brothers: Morgan Middleton; Ruairi McDonald; Oliver Battersby
- Half-sisters: Amy Barlow
- Grandfathers: Jim McDonald; Clive Middleton
- Grandmothers: Liz McDonald; Pam Middleton
- Uncles: Andy McDonald; Lee Middleton
- First cousins: Ollie Driscoll; Will Driscoll

Emma Brooker is a fictional character from the British soap opera Coronation Street, portrayed by Alexandra Mardell. She first appeared on-screen during the episode broadcast on 20 April 2018. Emma's storylines have included short-term relationships with David Platt (Jack P. Shepherd), Chesney Brown (Sam Aston) and Seb Franklin (Harry Visinoni), surviving a roof collapse at the local factory, discovering that Steve McDonald (Simon Gregson) is her biological father, a relationship with Curtis Delamere (Sam Retford) who suffers from factitious disorder and running over an elderly man in her car. Mardell announced her departure from the show in February 2022, departing on 8 April 2022.

== Development ==
=== Character creation and role ===
Emma first appeared in Episode 9435 in April 2018. Mardell's casting was announced on 21 March 2018, where it was revealed that she would be introduced as the new apprentice at Audrey Roberts' (Sue Nicholls) salon. Duncan Lindsay of the Metro reported that Emma would be incompetent at her job, which makes her clash with David Platt (Jack P. Shepherd), who had recently been raped by Josh Tucker (Ryan Clayton). David Brown of the Radio Times described the character as "bubbly". In June 2018, Mardell was offered a six-month extension to her contract after proving popular with the producers as well as the viewers. Following her contract renewal, Mardell relocated from her home in London to Manchester - where the show is filmed. Before landing the job on Corrie, Mardell's only other television credit was for an episode of Vera in 2017, since appearing on the show, she has become the co-artistic director at the JunkBox Theatre in Manchester.

Producer Kate Oates has said that by having sex with Emma, David is "trying to find a way to hide in plain sight." She added that David would credit having sex with Emma as "one of his big mistakes", but feels that it is a method of proving his masculinity. On her introduction, Mardell told Brown (Radio Times) that she found the experience "very surreal", but said that she "settled in quite quickly". As part of a new salon storyline, Mardell featured in scenes with Rula Lenska, who portrays rival hairdresser Claudia Colby. She enjoyed filming with Nicholls and Lenska and felt "spoilt" to share scenes with both actresses. Emma was also given a love interest in established character Seb Franklin (Harry Visinoni), who is HIV-positive. Mardell thought that Emma would be "open-minded" about Seb's diagnosis, but would not understand it properly. She also believed that there would be problems with Seb's former girlfriend, Faye Windass (Ellie Leach), who was still romantically interested in him.

=== Parental developments ===
Following Emma's first appearance on the show, many viewers began to pick up on the similarities between her and previous character Fiona Middleton (Angela Griffin) last seen in September 1998, as both characters looked alike, worked at the salon and lived at 2a Coronation Street. Although, during an interview with The Sun, Mardell explained "I've heard the Fiona and Steve's daughter theory, but that's definitely not true. I did have a little chat and a joke with Angela Griffin about it and that was quite funny". However, the storyline later went ahead and Emma was revealed to be Steve McDonald (Simon Gregson) and Fiona's daughter in August 2019. Despite the storyline going ahead, Fiona never returned to the street. Instead, she appeared to Emma from Australia via a video call in Episode 9854. However, Angela Griffin made a return to the street in real-life to film her scenes and spent time catching up with Nicholls and Mardell. After the parental developments were announced, some fans began theorising that a twist could see Emma turn out to be Jim McDonald (Charles Lawson)'s daughter instead of Steve's, due to his involvement with Fiona in the 1990s. However, the show confirmed that Steve was her biological father, when he received the DNA results in Episode 9853. In an interview, Mardell stated that she believed Emma would eventually come to terms with the revelation and "isn't one to hold a grudge".

Teasing her character's future, Mardell said: "No one will ever replace her dad, but her mum lives in Australia and she doesn't have any other family on the Street so it would be a waste to let that relationship go. She bonds with Liz McDonald (Beverley Callard) quite quickly, she's part of the McDonald family, they're taking her in. She's a McDonald now."

== Storylines ==
Emma applies for an apprentice position at Audrey's when Maria Connor (Samia Longchambon) struggles to handle her workload with owner Audrey Roberts (Sue Nicholls) being in hospital and David Platt (Jack P. Shepherd) taking some time off work for personal reasons. Her application is successful and she begins work that month, much to the displeasure of David - who is set to be training her after he returns to work the same month - as he finds her annoying. When Emma arrives late, having missed her tram as she was too busy preparing for her first day, she begins irritating David by accidentally dropping products on the floor, her lack of initiative to put the kettle on and her constant apologies for her mistakes, among other things. David cited that she was a "walking disaster zone" and told Maria that there was no way that she would be staying. However, Maria was insistent that she needed extra help with the amount of time David and his gran were taking off and said that Emma was friendly and keen to work. Despite his initial dislike for Emma, David realised that she was the perfect opportunity to help him feel masculine again - after he was viciously raped by his supposed friend Josh Tucker (Ryan Clayton) in March that year. David seduced Emma and, hoping to impress the boss in order to keep the job, she agreed to have sex with him and the pair began a relationship - with Emma leaving her shared flat and moving into 8 Coronation Street, much to Gail Rodwell's (Helen Worth) shock. Shona tells David to stop using Emma, as she is young and naive and shouldn't be brought into his dramas - but he refuses until the tragic suicide of Aidan Connor (Shayne Ward) in May. Realising the extent of his own mental health issues brought on by the rape and that he needs help before he goes the same way Aidan did - David broke off his relationship with Emma, confessing his love for Shona and admits that he'd been raped by Josh.

Emma gets over being dumped quickly, moving into 19a Rosamund Street with Billy Mayhew (Daniel Brocklebank) and Summer Spellman (Matilda Freeman) - as per Shona's advice and begins showing an interest in local builder Seb Franklin (Harry Visinoni) who, unlike David, was of a similar age to her. Emma and Seb began to flirt, despite the fact that he was still in a relationship with Faye Windass (Ellie Leach) - who became jealous of his and Emma's attraction. In August 2018, Faye's stepmother, Sally Metcalfe (Sally Dynevor) clocked Seb's dissatisfaction when Faye revealed that she was returning to the area full time, having been living with her mother Anna (Debbie Rush) for the past few months and implored Seb to end things with her if she was not who he wanted to be with. Although Seb found himself unable to confide in Emma that he had HIV and the pair's relationship didn't progress. Eventually, Emma moved in to 2a Coronation Street with Maria, her son Liam Connor (Charlie Wrenshall) and Bethany Platt (Lucy Fallon) after deciding to leave Billy's flat after it got too cramped with the addition of Sean Tully (Antony Cotton). Later, Emma strikes up a friendship with Chesney Brown (Sam Aston) and agrees to go on a date with him in order for her to work out his flaws when it comes to relationships. Emma quickly falls for Chesney and they begin dating, but she is disheartened to realise that he is actually interested in Gemma Winter (Dolly-Rose Campbell) instead. Unwilling to stand between 'true love', Emma breaks things off with Chesney and implores him to make a go of things with Gemma. Emma becomes firm friends with Gemma, who is able to convince Johnny (Richard Hawley) and Jenny Connor (Sally Ann Matthews) to hire Emma at The Rovers Return - and the pair are caught up in the Underworld factory roof collapse together when Gary Windass (Mikey North) sabotages the roof. Although both escape unscathed, the collapse proves fatal for Rana Habeeb (Bhavna Limbachia).

== Reception ==
For her portrayal of Emma, Mardell was nominated for Best Soap Newcomer at the 2018 Digital Spy Reader Awards. She placed fifth with 7.7% of the total votes. She was also longlisted in the Best Newcomer category at the 2018 Inside Soap Awards. Mardell was nominated in the Newcomer category at the National Television Awards in 2019 and won Best Newcomer at the 2019 British Soap Awards. Laura-Jayne Tyler from Inside Soap commented on Emma's lovelife, writing "It's a wonder she hasn't volunteered herself to the local nunnery". Following the news of Mardell's departure, Alice Penwill from the same magazine wrote that she would "miss" Emma.
