= Alexandra Mardell =

English actress

- Born: Leeds, West Yorkshire, England
- Education: Guildford School of Acting
- Occupation: Actor
- Years active: 2017–present
- Television: Coronation Street; Smoggie Queens
- Awards: British Soap Award for Best Newcomer (2019)

Alexandra Mardell is an English actress, known for playing Emma Brooker in the ITV soap opera Coronation Street. In 2019, she won the British Soap Award for Best Newcomer for her portrayal, and was nominated for Newcomer at the 24th National Television Awards.

== Early and personal life ==
Mardell was born in Leeds to parents Janet and Michael; her father Michael died in 2016 from cardiomyopathy. She attended Batley Grammar School, and later studied acting at the Guildford School of Acting (GSA). While attending GSA, Mardell met fellow actor Joe Parker, with whom she began a relationship in 2017. In April 2021, she announced her engagement to Parker.

== Career ==
In 2017, Mardell made her professional acting debut in an episode of the ITV crime drama series Vera. Later that year, she starred in the short film Chocolate Pieces. In 2018, she was cast in the ITV soap opera Coronation Street as series regular Emma Brooker. For her portrayal, she was longlisted for Best Newcomer at the 2018 Inside Soap Awards, nominated for Newcomer at the 24th National Television Awards, and later awarded the British Soap Award for Best Newcomer at the 2019 British Soap Awards.

In 2022, she took the title role in BBC Radio 4's production of English Rose, about a British vampire taking a job as a nanny in Manhattan.

On 30 November 2022, it was announced she would dance with Kai Widdrington for the 2022 Strictly Come Dancing Christmas Special, which she went on to win.

== Filmography ==
=== Film ===
Year	Title	Role	Notes
2017	Chocolate Pieces	Elle	Short film
2018	Walk Like a Panther	Cliff's Daughter	

=== Television ===
Year	Title	Role	Notes
2017	Vera	Kelly Horton	Series 7; Episode 2: "Dark Angel"
2018–2022	Coronation Street	Emma Brooker	Regular role; 339 episodes
2021–2024	Fireman Sam	Ellie Phillips (voice)	Series 13–16; 41 episodes
2022	Strictly Come Dancing	Herself – Contestant	Series 20; Episode 26: "Christmas Special" (winner)
2023	The Family Pile	Gaynor	Episodes 1–6
2024	Daddy Issues	Keeley	Episode 1: "Happy Tears"
2024–present	Smoggie Queens	Lucinda	12 episodes
2026–present	War	Cleo Hyland	6 episodes

== Awards and nominations ==
Year	Award	Category	Result	Ref.
2018	Inside Soap Awards	Best Newcomer	Longlisted	
2018	Digital Spy Reader Awards	Best Soap Newcomer	Fifth	
2019	24th National Television Awards	Newcomer	Nominated	
2019	The British Soap Awards	Best Newcomer	Won	
2020	25th National Television Awards	Serial Drama Performance	Nominated	
2024	UK Pantomime Awards	Barbara Windsor Award for Best Principal Lead	Won	
