= Gary Windass =

Fictional character from Coronation Street

- Coronation Street character
- Portrayed by: Mikey North
- Duration: 2008–present
- First appearance: 14 November 2008
- Introduced by: Kim Crowther
- Spin-off appearances: Gary's Army Diaries (2011)
In-universe information
- Occupation: Soldier; Labourer; Delivery man; Café waiter; Gym manager; Security guard; Builder; Loan shark; Businessman; Debt collector
- Father: Eddie Windass
- Mother: Anna Windass
- Half-sisters: Faye Windass (adoptive)
- Wife: Maria Connor (2020–present)
- Sons: Jake Windass; Zack Rubinstein
- Adoptive daughters: Kelly Neelan (ward)
- Stepsons: Liam Connor Jr.
- Uncles: Len Windass
- Nieces: Miley Hodge (adoptive)
- First cousins: Rory

Gary Windass is a fictional character from the British ITV soap opera Coronation Street, portrayed by Mikey North. The character first appeared on 14 November 2008, along with his parents, Eddie (Steve Huison) and Anna Windass (Debbie Rush).

In the show, the character was romantically involved with Izzy Armstrong (Cherylee Houston), Alya Nazir (Sair Khan) and Sarah Platt (Tina O'Brien). The character was also engaged in feuds with Sarah's brother David Platt (Jack P. Shepherd), Izzy's father Owen Armstrong (Ian Puleston-Davies), and most prominently, with Anna's rapist Pat Phelan (Connor McIntyre).

Gary's story-lines include his conflict with PTSD after joining the army, forming a business partnership with Owen, bonding with his parents' adopted daughter Faye (Ellie Leach), a brief custody battle against ex-girlfriend Tina McIntyre (Michelle Keegan) after she becomes their surrogate and gives birth to Gary and Izzy's son Jake, a close friendship with Faye's biological father Tim Metcalfe (Joe Duttine), helping Sarah's daughter Bethany (Lucy Fallon) overcome her troubles with bullying in school and being subjugated to child grooming and sexual exploitation by her pimp Nathan Curtis (Christopher Harper), a one-night stand with Phelan's daughter Nicola Rubinstein (Nicola Thorp), which results in her giving birth to their son Zack and appointing Faye's boyfriend Seb Franklin (Harry Visinoni) to become his apprentice.

In 2019, Gary became the show's main antagonist when he was revealed to be the culprit who caused the death of Alya's sister-in-law, Rana Habeeb (Bhavna Limbachia), by sabotaging the Underworld Factory roof in his attempt to sort out his debts to loan shark Rick Neelan (Greg Wood). This led to the collapse of the factory roof and Rana being killed from the incident as a result. The character later killed Rick in self-defense when the latter tried to murder him in the woods, subsequently taking over his criminal empire as a result. Soon afterwards, Gary proceeded to establish a relationship with David's colleague Maria Connor (Samia Longchambon), clash with Rana's brother Imran Habeeb (Charlie De Melo) over the circumstances behind his sister's death, become enemies with ex-girlfriend Sarah's boyfriend Adam Barlow (Sam Robertson) after growing jealous of their newfound romance, develop a feud with Maria's love interest Ali Neeson (James Burrows), hospitalise Ali's brother Ryan (Ryan Prescott) after beating him up for unintentionally stealing his money and blackmail his own client Derek Milligan (Craige Els) into taking part in his scheme to invest the factory - which ultimately sparked the event of Derek instigating a lethal Christmas siege that culminates in his own death, though not after accidentally killing Ali's stepfather Robert Preston (Tristan Gemmill) and shooting David's wife Shona Platt (Julia Goulding) in the resulting impact.

== Creation ==
The character of Gary was created as part of a new family unit that new producer Kim Crowther introduced to the soap opera, consisting of a mother, father, son and uncle. They were originally billed as a storyline device for the established character David Platt. An ITV spokesperson said of the character and his onscreen family: "The Windass family are very rough and ready, always ducking and diving. Early on they get involved with David Platt when he helps to fit a new kitchen in the Windass family home. However, Anna thinks the work is shoddy and refuses to pay for it. David goes round, rips out the kitchen and sets fire to it outside the family’s house." fellow actress Debbie Rush said of their entrance and choice of surname for the family, that they would be prepared for the public taunts they would receive for their surname. The character was originally called Carl Windass but was changed last minute to Gary Windass after a series of name changes to all the members of the family since their inception, but before appearing on screen.

Upon their on-screen arrival, it panned out almost as planned seeing him arrive as the son of Eddie and Anna Windass. Gary and his uncle Len went after David Platt and Joe McIntyre after David menaced his parents into handing over the money they owed for a new kitchen. Even though he has been brought up by his parents Gary looks up to his uncle who has had a heavy impact on his personality and his antics on the wrong side of the law.

== Development ==
The character of Gary is quite one-sided at first with him being presented as a typical bad boy. Actor Mikey North who portrays the character told the Scarborough Evening News that he is a hard nut type of guy but has plenty more side to come out stating: "Gary has a lot of sides to him. He is a bit of a hard nut, but also a charmer with the ladies.". Also he calls his character a lovable rogue. His traits and personality are based on what his onscreen uncle tells him to act like and in an interview with media website Digital Spy he talks about this saying: "He gets it all from his uncle Len, who in a way is his idol. Gary copies his uncle and wants to be like him, even though he realises that it's not the best thing to do." In the same interview he also speaks about the fact that Gary is in love with himself and thinks he can get any girl he wants with his own one-liners and the fact he loves to know that he is succeeding in winding people up with his antics. Popular Corrie coverage website Corrieblog described the character as cunning in the 'thick way' as he knows he would have to face consequences for fighting after he continually wound fellow character David Platt up.

After six months of the character being on screen, North commented more about his character saying: "The first time you step onto the Street you have to stamp your mark as to what kind of character you are. At first, Gary was shouty and happy to be aggressive, but the more you see it, his nicer side is coming out. In the run-up to the court case, you see him showing affection towards his family. He fears the worst. He thinks he's going to go down. He's worried about his mum too."

== Storylines ==
Gary arrives in Weatherfield with his uncle Len (Conor Ryan). Together, they steal tools that belong to local builder Joe McIntyre (Reece Dinsdale). Shortly afterward, Gary and Len steal and burn out a sports car that Joe's stepson David Platt (Jack P. Shepherd) and his friend Graeme Proctor (Craig Gazey) had been driving. Gary is later furious when David smugly informs him that the car was already stolen. Gary and the rest of his family later move next door to the Platts' where their quarrel continues to heighten.

On Christmas Eve 2008, he flirts with Rosie Webster (Helen Flanagan) in The Rovers Return Inn. The pair then get drunk on Rosie's birthday champagne and end up in bed together that night much to the annoyance of her parents, Kevin (Michael Le Vell) and Sally (Sally Dynevor). The following day, Gary virtually ignores Rosie when he arrives at the Platts' Christmas dinner party. He then gets into a fistfight with David after telling him he has set his sights on his girlfriend - Joe's daughter Tina (Michelle Keegan).

On New Year's Day 2009, Gary constantly pesters Tina, which results in Joe warning him off. In spite of the tension, Gary shares a relatively friendly relationship with Tina and enjoys winding David up by repeatedly bragging that Tina was soon going to be his girlfriend.

After Gary nearly brawls with Joe, he talks Len into helping him steal expensive copper piping from Joe's workplace. Joe is initially the prime suspect, but David tells the police he had seen Gary and Len laughing and driving away the night of the theft. Gary is thrilled to learn that Tina believes he is innocent, as this drives a further wedge between her and David.

In January 2009, Gary continually follows and taunts David following him down the street. During an altercation, Gary mentions several things from David's past, including him driving into the lake in a suicide attempt, and accidentally pushing his mother Gail Platt (Helen Worth) down the stairs. Things escalate when David enters his house, having seen Tina approaching, Gary blocks him from shutting the door and tells him "Come out and fight me like a man or are you scared?" David shoves Gary back and after a few more words the pair fight. Gary gets the better of it and David is left on the floor after the fight, later it emerges that he has a broken nose and concussion. After the fight, Gary flees but he is arrested upon his return. Tina lies to the police after David asks her to; the story also received media attention ahead of the air date.

Gary starts to become very worried that he is going to prison as Tina continues to persist with her claims. He gets very angry when he discovers that Len has been intimidating Tina into changing her story and apologises to her for Len's behavior. On 2 March 2009, Gary's court hearing takes place, during which Tina admits to the prosecution that she had been lying about who started the fight. Gary is cleared of the assault charge much to his relief and his family's delight.

A few months after the verdict, David begins plotting against Gary. He steals tools from Kevin's garage which belonged to Kevin's father Bill (Peter Armitage) and lets Gary take the blame for it, only to defend him, this is a way for him to make Gary believe the air is cleared between the pair as they shake hands and makeup. David tricks Gary into buying stolen goods from him - but they actually belong to Graeme. In June 2009, David takes full revenge on Gary when Gail and his grandmother Audrey Roberts (Sue Nicholls) go abroad. He tricks Gary into robbing a house - which is Audrey's - David steals the keys and hides all photos of his family so Gary will not know whose house he is burgling. While David deliberately stays home during the burglary, he asks Graeme to spy on Gary as he goes to the house, Gary is about to go home when he hears that David is not coming, but instead goes into the house. Graeme tells David about this via phone and David tells him to call the police. However, David's grandfather Ted Page (Michael Byrne), who is house-sitting, arrives at Audrey's. Gary sees him and pushes him as he tries to make a run for it, while Ted chases him. Ted recognises him and calls the police. Gary returns to the Street only to see a police car outside his house. He has no choice but to run away. David's plan to frame Gary and get rid of him has tragic consequences as Ted later has a heart attack, which he survives. Len offers Gary an alibi, but Gary is still arrested, only to be released later. Gary realises that David has set him up and attacks him, warning him not to cross him again. Gary had told his parents and the police that he wasn't robbing Audrey's house, however, he later tells his parents the truth and decides to confess to the police.

Gary apologises to Ted for what happened - although this is halted by David - Ted accepts the apology and even helps build bridges between Gail and the Windass family. However, the Windasses have since been shunned by the rest of the Street; when Gary goes to the corner shop, he is ignored by Tina and taunted by Minnie Chandra (Poppy Jhakra), although Molly Dobbs (Vicky Binns) is less judgmental. Gary and his father, Eddie Windass (Steve Huison) are told to get out of the kebab shop by Tina and are later ridiculed by Janice Battersby (Vicky Entwistle) and Sean Tully (Antony Cotton). On 26 June 2009, Gary is sentenced, much to the delight of David, however, Gary tells the police about David's involvement in the burglary and David is the one who is shunned as a result. While Gary is incarcerated, David is beaten up on the street by an unknown attacker. When Gary is released, he gleefully reveals to David that he organised it.

In November 2009, Gary makes an insulting remark about the armed forces when he sees Ted wearing a poppy for Remembrance Day. Ted and Peter Barlow (Chris Gascoyne) vent their anger at Gary, who takes it to heart, apologizing to Ted the next day. He asks to hear about his days of service. Ted's stories soon lead Gary to go on a taster weekend for the army, after which he decides to sign up.

In January 2010, an emotional going-away party is held for him in the Rovers, David shakes hands with him, while slyly putting an archery target on his back. Anna is furious when she discovers this, Gary tells her not to rise to it and calls David a 'loser' in front of everyone, it appears that the pub are more on Gary's side. After a tearful goodbye, he says goodbye to his parents and leaves in the back of a cab.

Gary returns several weeks later with Luke "Quinny" Quinn (Steven Bell), a friend who is also in the armed forces. During their visit, Quinny receives news that his brother, also serving in the Army, has lost his legs in a roadside bomb. The news makes Gary and Anna even more anxious about potentially going to war. Indeed, several weeks later, Gary goes AWOL through fear of what might happen in a warzone. He is discovered by David, who agrees to keep quiet. However, upon seeing the stress Anna is under, David informs the Windass parents of Gary's whereabouts. Eddie later convinces him to return to the Army. In September 2010, Gary and Quinny returned for another visit before they went to Afghanistan. Becky McDonald's (Katherine Kelly) half-sister Kylie Turner (Paula Lane) sets her sights on Gary and the two end up sleeping together in Mary Taylor's (Patti Clare) motor home. Gary soon tires of Kylie, however, and attempts to win the affection of Izzy Armstrong (Cherylee Houston). To prove himself, he stands up to a man who makes an insulting comment about Izzy's disability. Gary and Quinny later get into a fight outside the Rovers with the men in question and Gary punches the thug. A passing Kirk Sutherland (Andrew Whyment) tells Gary and Quinny to go before anybody sees them. Kirk later takes the blame for the attack, with a relieved Gary thankful to Kirk for saving his Army career. The night before he heads out to Afghanistan, Gary finally gets together with Izzy.

An army officer visits Anna and Eddie in November 2010, informing them that Gary was involved in a roadside bomb and is severely injured whereas the other troops, including Quinny, had died as a result. He also states that Gary will be sent to Queen Elizabeth Hospital Birmingham in Birmingham. Roy Cropper (David Neilson) informs the public at the Rovers about the tragic news and, as a mark of respect, he requests a 2-minute silence. Gary is psychologically and emotionally scarred as a result of the attack. He lashes out at those around him, including Anna. He plans on visiting Quinny's bereaved parents but cannot face it and doesn't go. The chaotic aftermath of the street's tram crash on 6 December 2010 triggers Gary's post-traumatic stress disorder and he is forced to flee to his home where he breaks down in tears. He becomes increasingly more withdrawn and begins drinking alone much to the concern of Izzy, Eddie and Anna. Eventually, Gary manages to deal with this problem himself and eventually faces Quinny's parents which seems to have helped him a lot.

Gary becomes obsessed with Izzy's welfare. He takes a job at Underworld so he can be around her more. Izzy goes into town with Sean and Julie Carp (Katy Cavanagh) to get away from Gary for a while, only to get robbed at a cash point. Gary then takes Izzy's wheelchair away so she cannot leave the house and says he will later return it. He then keeps her imprisoned in the house until Izzy's father Owen (Ian Puleston-Davies) rescues Izzy. He then breaks up with Izzy. When Owen takes an interest in Anna, her adopted daughter Faye Butler (Ellie Leach) steals Owen's phone so that she and Anna can go to the cinema as planned instead of Anna meeting Owen at The Rovers. Faye later sends Anna a message that Owen does not want to meet her. After Anna finds out about the situation, she tells Owen she is not interested. Later, Owen and Anna sleep together. Anna does not know if she has made the right decision, so she tells Gary, who then sets Owen and Anna up at The Bistro. By then, Faye and Gary have gradually bonded. In July 2012, Izzy and Gary decided to have a baby. Izzy miscarries and they try to adopt, but can't, due to Gary's criminal record. Izzy's sister Katy (Georgia May Foote) offers to be a surrogate mother to their baby. At first, they all agree, but Katy's ex-boyfriend Chesney Brown (Sam Aston) at first refuses to let them do it. Chesney finally agrees, but Izzy sees it isn't fair, so she calls it off – she also breaks up with Gary because of his desire to be a dad and her not being able to give him that. They reunite and eventually select Tina as their surrogate after Owen offers to pay her. Tina is successfully impregnated with Gary and Izzy's child in November 2012, and her pregnancy goes smoothly for the first trimester, although Tina grows aggravated at Gary's interference. However, in April 2013, Gary's feelings for Tina become more romantic after Izzy leaves an antenatal class due to Gary's touching of Tina. Gary later acts on his feelings for Tina and makes a pass at her, but she rejects him. Izzy overhears Gary and Tina discussing what happened and as the pair argue Tina goes into labour. Tina gives birth to a baby boy prematurely, and Izzy stops Gary from seeing him as he tried to cheat on her. As Gary and Izzy continue to argue, Tina becomes convinced they won't make good parents, so she decides to name the baby Joe and keep him for herself. Izzy and Gary visit lawyers but find out it will take years to get Joe back. Gary is devastated when Izzy gives up fighting and tells Tina she can keep Joe. Afterwards, Izzy begins to soften towards Gary, and he moves back in with her.

In October 2013, Gary learns that Owen is having trouble with being owed £4,000 from his client Pat Phelan (Connor McIntyre). He later helps Owen break into Phelan's house to steal his motorcycle and lock the vehicle into his yard, which later forces Phelan to repay his debt to Owen. Later on, Phelan and his wife Valerie (Caroline Berry) visited the Armstrong-Windass family around Christmas that year. Phelan proposed that Gary and Owen work alongside him on a building project that will allow them to make £200,000 in exchange for Owen investing his £80,000 savings onto the project, to which he reluctantly agrees.

In 2014 onwards, the partnership seems to go well at first until Gary learns from Izzy that Phelan has developed sexual feelings towards Anna. This prompts Gary to confront Phelan when all the builders, including Owen, have left the worksite. As Gary demands that Phelan stay away from his mother, Phelan begins to badmouth Anna - which causes Gary to punch Phelan in response. This results in the pair fighting, with Phelan getting the upper hand until Gary picks up a plank of wood and uses it to hit the latter, knocking Phelan unconscious as a result. Gary, believing he has killed Phelan, calls Owen to tell him what has happened and later brings him to the work site, where they are surprised to find that Phelan has vanished.

A few days later in March 2014, Phelan reappears at Weatherfield and summons Gary and Owen without the rest of their family's knowledge, telling the duo how he plans to get revenge on them over the incident. When they attempt to end their partnership with Phelan the following morning, he takes Gary and Owen into the site office and shows them CCTV footage of Gary attacking him. Phelan assures Gary and Owen that he has further copies and then demands that either they complete the work for a minimum wage — gleaning no profit — or he would hand the CCTV footage into the police. Despite Gary's reluctance, Owen complies with Phelan's orders as he does not want his grandson Jake to grow up without a father if Gary were to be sent to prison. Phelan relishes in blackmailing Owen and Gary, such as ordering the former to wash his car and getting the latter to dig a grave for a dead pigeon. This effectively strains Owen and Gary's friendship, as they begin to take their frustrations out on each other as well as their family. Phelan continues to overwork the pair by forcing them to remove perfectly fitted windows from the building his crewmen are working on, an act which nearly causes Gary to lash out at Phelan until Owen quickly stops him. Gary soon plans to get even on Phelan by stealing a shipment of tiles from him, but Phelan quickly finds out that it was Gary and was ready to report him to the police until Owen manages to stop him — pointing out that Gary's wages are already being docked because of the situation he caused in the first place. Phelan agrees not to report Gary to the police, but instead tells Owen that he'll be keeping the £80,000 that he invested onto their project — which turns out to be what Phelan had intended to do all along to exact revenge on Owen for stealing his motorbike and being forced to pay what was owed. Owen later blames Gary for the predicament that Phelan has inflicted upon them. When Phelan takes Valerie on a holiday trip the next day, Gary breaks into their house in an attempt to extract the CCTV footage. However, Owen quickly stops him in his tracks — reminding Gary that Phelan has multiple copies. The two start planning on seeking other job placements in order to prevent Phelan from blackmailing them any further, but this fails when Phelan learns about the break-in at his house and deduces Gary's involvement. In retaliation, Phelan arranges for Owen to be removed from the council's list of approved builders — effectively blacklisting him, which meant Owen could no longer get any independent work.

In April 2014, Gary and Owen are surprised when Phelan later tells the pair that he is releasing them from his project and later departs Weatherfield. This relieves Gary and Owen, but the pair are later devastated when Anna admits that she is the reason why Phelan released them from his contract; Phelan had blackmailed her into sleeping with him, effectively raping Anna as a result. Moreover, Gary's friendship with Owen is further strained when the latter punches him during an argument over their ordeal — which proves evident when the bailiffs turn up to clear Owen of his debts that he is unable to repay as a result of what Phelan did to them. Eventually, Owen makes amends with Gary and later departs Weatherfield the following year after he and Anna are unable to resume their relationship.

By 2015, Gary has already formed a relationship with one of his newest neighbors - Alya Nazir (Sair Khan). The two first meet in the club during a night out and he later wakes up the following morning in her bed, but Alya reassures him nothing happened. Gary soon splits from Izzy and Alya apologises to Izzy after believing they split due to her and Gary kissing. Gary and Alya soon start going out, but Alya dreads telling her family and when Gary and Alya spend time at Alya's house, Alya's father Kal (Jimi Mistry) and grandmother Yasmeen (Shelley King) catch them in a compromising position and misunderstands the situation. Gary and Alya's relationship is soon accepted by Alya's family, though her brother Zeedan Nazir (Qasim Akhtar) takes more time. After Kal's death, Gary proposes to Alya, but Alya isn't sure after sleeping with Gary's friend Jason Grimshaw (Ryan Thomas); in her grief over her father's death she had wanted to sleep with Gary for the first time. He refused, as he knew she was only acting out of grief, and she slept with Ryan. However, she later changes her mind. Alya confesses to Gary that she slept with someone else, and Gary is led to believe it is her boss Aidan Connor (Shayne Ward) who slept with her. Gary plans to confront Aidan until Jason admits that he slept with Alya. After overcoming another broken relationship, Gary goes to Germany to stay with his dad.

He later returns in 2016 - whereupon he insists on working at the gym. Whilst working there, Gary befriends David's niece Bethany Platt (Lucy Fallon) after she collapses as a result of taking diet pills that she purchased from the internet. He confronts her about the pills, and she confides in him about her GCSE results.

In October 2016, Gary rescues David's daughter Lily (Brooke Malonie) when she is nearly run over by her father, who was driving in a petrol-soaked car in an attempt to kill Clayton Hibbs (Callum Harrison), the convict who killed Kylie in July 2016, but ends up trapped underneath the car after David was barely able to swerve out of the way before flipping the vehicle over. David and the other residents of the street were able to lift the car to free Gary and Lily before a spark caused the car to explode. Gary then watched in horror as a fireball from the car struck Anna and set her on fire, but Kevin and Nick were able to extinguish the flames. Gary later went with a badly burned Anna to the hospital, where she gradually recovered from her injuries. Gary soon learns that David is to blame for Anna's predicament when Bethany's mother, Sarah (Tina O'Brien), privately tells him the truth about the incident. This results in Gary confronting and punching David, but he later forgives him at Sarah's urging. Gary and Sarah quickly form a relationship afterwards, despite Bethany developing romantic feelings towards Gary.

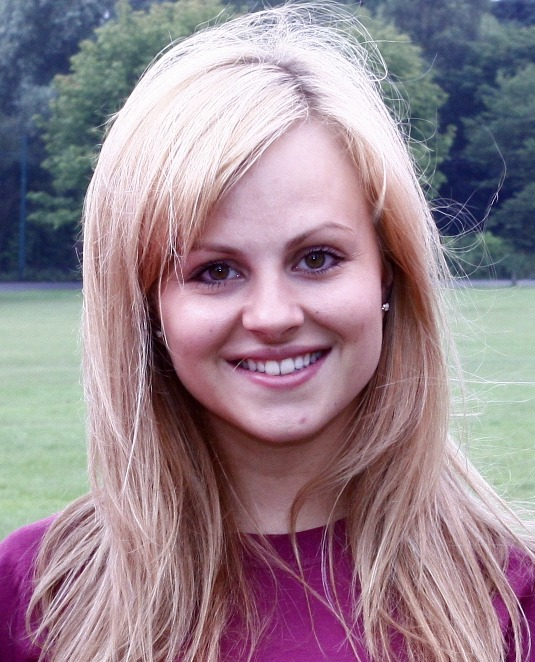
Gary's relationship with Sarah Platt (Tina O'Brien; pictured) caused disapproval at first due to both families originally feuding.

The couple and David soon work together with the latter's new girlfriend, Shona Ramsey (Julia Goulding), to imprison her ex-boyfriend Nathan Curtis (Christopher Harper) after learning that he has been sexually grooming and exploiting Bethany into his pimp business. They are eventually successful when Nathan and his conspirators, including corrupt policeman Neil Clifton (Ben Cartwright) and fellow accomplice Ian Yardley (Anthony Bowers), are all found guilty of raping Bethany and receive maximum prison sentences.

It is at this point where Pat Phelan has returned to Weatherfield after his marriage with Valerie fell apart thanks to her learning about what he did to the Armstrong and Windass families. His feud with Gary resurfaces when Gary confronts Phelan upon spotting him at the garage, but Anna urges him to stay away from Phelan for his own safety. Despite this, they continue to clash as Phelan sparks the events of Jason leaving Weatherfield for Thailand by sabotaging his business empire and later usurping his position as the landlord of a flat. This escalates when Phelan defrauds Sarah, along with Alya's grandmother Yasmeen Nazir (Shelley King) and her friend Rita Tanner (Barbara Knox), in his flats scam project called "Calcutta Street" — which culminates with Phelan causing the death of Sarah's stepfather Michael Rodwell (Les Dennis) by watching him die of a heart attack without providing help. As Gary helps Sarah and her family as they grieve over Michael's death, he finds himself having to embark on some dangerous jobs in Ukraine in order to repay some of his debts. He soon confines his troubles with Phelan's long-lost daughter, Nicola Rubinstein (Nicola Thorp), and the two later have a one-night stand. Gary quickly regrets upon learning that Nicola is Phelan's daughter, and he initially tells her to stay away from him, but later befriends Nicola after she discovers what Phelan did to him and Anna. Their companionship becomes troubled when Nicola learns that she is pregnant, and Gary finds out that he is the father. Moreover, Phelan has set up Anna for pushing Faye's boyfriend Seb Franklin (Harry Visinoni) off a ladder in retaliation for turning Nicola against him. Despite his efforts to prove his mother's innocence, Anna is found guilty for Seb's accident and is sentenced to five years imprisonment; Gary misses the verdict after being mugged whilst he and Bethany's close friend, Craig Tinker (Colson Smith), attempt to stop her from working as a lap dancer.

Following Anna's imprisonment, Gary continues with her campaign to bring Phelan to justice for his crimes against them. He teams up with Nicola and Seb, along with Faye's father Tim Metcalfe (Joe Duttine), to prove that Phelan is responsible for killing their neighbor Luke Britton (Dean Fagan) after Seb had deduced that Phelan is the killer upon being manipulated by the latter into touching his gun, the weapon that Phelan used to kill Luke, and later finding out that Luke had been shot before dying in a vehicle explosion. Their efforts seem futile at first until Seb later tells Gary that he believes Phelan has hidden the gun at his worksite, which leads the pair to try and uncover it. However, they are surprised to learn that Phelan has actually hidden two bodies at the worksite — which nevertheless exposes the truth about Phelan killing Michael and Luke. It soon transpires that the two bodies were Phelan's business partner Vinny Ashford (Ian Kelsey) and Luke's best friend Andy Carver (Oliver Farnworth) — both of whom Phelan killed after keeping Andy captive in an abandoned warehouse for nearly the entirety of 2017 and uses the opportunity to exact revenge on Vinny for betraying him at the conclusion of their "Calcutta Street" scam.

With Phelan's crimes exposed and presumed dead following a showdown with Jason's mother Eileen (Sue Cleaver), whom he previously married back in January 2017, Gary is granted ownership of the yard and helps Faye collaborate with their friend Daniel Osbourne (Rob Mallard) planning to secure Anna's release from her false imprisonment. During the preparations, Gary is hospitalized after David brutally assaults him during a charity boxing match between them. While Sarah is left outraged at her brother's behavior, Gary grows concerned for David and is surprised to later find out that he had been raped by his new friend Josh Tucker (Ryan Clayton), and was suggesting from PTSD.

In May 2018, Nicola gives birth to her and Gary's child - Zack. However, Gary doesn't show up at the hospital while Nicola is giving birth upon making a discovery - Phelan has resurfaced. He plans to get revenge on Phelan for what he did to his family over the past four years and ends up tracking him from his hiding place in Abergele. Gary then calls his ex-militant associate, Joe Haslam (Chord Melodic), to help with his plans - though Joe initially refuses and leaves Gary on his own. However, after Phelan overpowers Gary upon being attacked, Joe returns and knocks Phelan unconscious before he could harm Gary. Together, they bring Phelan back to Weatherfield and hold him captive in the yard - where Sarah returns and discovers the situation just as Joe leaves the area. As Gary attempts to stop Sarah from calling the police whilst ignoring her efforts to talk him out of revenge, Phelan manages to free himself and subdues Gary by hitting him with a chair. Phelan then retrieves his gun, locks Gary and Sarah in the yard, and proceeds to confront Eileen and Nicola so he could get to see Zack. While attempting to escape, Gary and Sarah are released from their captivity by Anna - who herself has been released from prison at the time Phelan was presumed dead. The trio promptly rush off to stop Phelan, who ends up shooting Nicola after she tried to disarm him. As Anna heads down to confront Phelan at the Bistro, where he has instigated a hostage situation, Gary retrieves Zack while Sarah rushes over to Eileen and Seb - who were both knocked unconscious by Phelan during the struggle. Eventually, Anna prevents Phelan from escaping Weatherfield by stabbing him with a knife - though not before the latter ends up shooting the restaurant's co-owner Michelle Connor (Kym Marsh); however, she survives whilst Phelan dies from Anna's stabbing. Following Phelan's death, Anna leaves Weatherfield and Gary manages to make amends with Nicola after she discovers that he was the reason behind Phelan's siege. Nicola eventually leaves Weatherfield with Zack, despite Gary's initial protests.

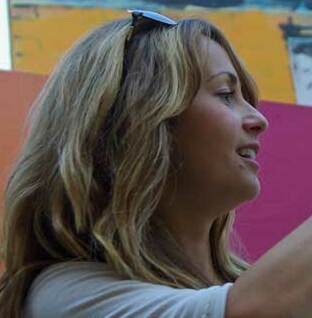
Gary starts a relationship with Maria Connor (Samia Longchambon; pictured).

In 2019, nearly a year later after Phelan's death, Gary retrieves Sarah's phone from her boss and Michelle's best friend Carla (Alison King) - which transpires that Gary is responsible for sabotaging the roof at the Underworld Factory, thus causing the death of Alya's sister-in-law Rana Habeeb (Bhavna Limbachia) after she died from the roof collapse. By then, Gary finds himself in debt to Tina's loan shark Rick Neelan (Greg Wood) and is forced to work for him. When Rick later attempts to kill Gary in a bid to tie up loose ends of his loan sharking activities, Gary ends up killing Rick by beating him to death with a rock. He manages to cover up his involvement in both Rana's death and Rick's murder, but this contributes to his aggressive behavior that results in Sarah ending their relationship. He soon clashes with Rana's brother Imran (Charlie de Melo) over the circumstances behind his sister's death, and later becomes enemies with his colleague Adam Barlow (Sam Robertson) - particularly as Sarah and Adam end up developing romantic feelings for each other. Gary soon bonds with Michelle and Carla's sister-in-law, Maria (Samia Longchambon), and they form a relationship. This escalates as Maria's ex-boyfriend Ali Neeson (James Burrows), who recently dumped Maria after inadvertently leaving her son Liam in danger, develops a feud with Gary after discovering his status as a loan-shark - with Gary having assumed ownership of Rick's criminal empire after the latter's death. Moreover, Ali's brother Ryan (Ryan Prescott) - whom Gary previously clashed over his broken relationship with Katy - has unwittingly stolen Gary's money from his desk at his shop. Gary later beats up Ryan after the latter is unable to repay him the money back.

Overtime, Gary plans to usurp control of the Underworld Factory and conducts a plan where his client Derek Milligan (Craige Els) - who owes Gary money - is summoned to pose as a businessman seeking to rebuild the Underworld Factory. Gary soon blackmails Derek into upholding his scheme to take over the factory, going as far as to threaten his family should he not comply with his orders. However, when Derek attempts to stand up to Gary and nearly foils his scheme as a result, Gary retaliates by holding him captive until Christmas Eve that year. Because of this, Derek has lost his last chance of reconciling with his ex-wife and their children. Seeking retribution, Derek steals a gun from Gary's shop and ends up instigating a siege in The Rovers while trying to find Gary. When Gary attempts to call his bluff, Derek fires the gun to prove his intent on killing Gary - unknowingly shooting Michelle's estranged husband, Robert Preston (Tristan Gemmill), in the process. Derek's siege culminates with him and Gary fighting near a roof, whereupon Shona gets shot during the struggle - wherein Gary also gets shot before Derek ends up tumbling below the roof. Gary attempts to bring Derek up to safety, but loses his grip and could only watch as Derek falls to his death. Gary is later rushed to the hospital, where he learns that Shona will recover from her gunshot wound while Robert has died from his injuries.

== Reception ==
Tony Stewart of The Mirror said of Gary that David Platt has met his match in the character and the two of them have enough criminal convictions, Asbos and restraining orders to wallpaper over their living room and comparing Gary and his family's criminal record to that of the Battersbys', saying the latter compared to them it's like a day out with the Von Trapp family. Grace Dent of The Guardian stated her love for the Windass family and of the character Gary, and she went on to describe him stating: "Gary Windass loves thieving cars, stealing tools from vans, spitting globs of phlegm between his front teeth and, at the mere hint of sunshine, strutting about with his top off wearing trakkie-beeees that cry out for a good boil wash. But that's fine by me as he's TWOC'd all of David Platt's thunder.." In 2010, Dan Martin from The Guardian speculated that a member of the Windass family could be one of the characters to be killed-off in the soap's 50th anniversary special, as he believed that the "primary function of a big soap disaster is to sweep out the dead wood", and that the Windasses was some of the "characters we don't care about even if we noticed they were there".

MSN branded Gary and his family as chavs (Gary being the prime example) and being perfect guests for the Jeremy Kyle show, and going on to calling them a million miles away from lower class yobbish families 'The Mortons' and 'The Battersbys'. Whereas Simon Swift of Soaplife magazine commented on the fact that on first looks he couldn't help feeling that Gary and the rest of the clan are a bit too much like original neighbours-from-hell the Battersbys. The character was also noted for the big impression he made within the soap in such a short space of time by Rick Fulton of The Daily Record So much so that he has been nominated for Villain Of The Year in The British Soap Awards 2009, which he did not go on to win. Kris Green of media website Digital Spy praised and commented on the fact that Gary and her family had 'settled in so well, in such a short space of time', with actor Mikey North stating that their success is down to the good writing and many plotlines the family received in the short time period. Mikey North also said that even though his character is a bad boy he has gained the public support after beating David Platt up, branding him as a legend for being the first one to do it. (The public loathe the character of David's antics)

In August 2017, North has longlisted for Sexiest Male at the Inside Soap Awards. He did not progress to the viewer-voted shortlist.
