= David Platt (Coronation Street) =

Fictional character from Coronation Street

- Coronation Street character
- Jack P. Shepherd as David Platt (2017)
- Portrayed by: Thomas Ormson (1990–2000); Jack P. Shepherd (2000–present)
- Duration: 1990–present
- First appearance: 26 December 1990
- Introduced by: Mervyn Watson
- Book appearances: Coronation Street: The Complete Saga; Norman Bates with a Briefcase: The Story of Richard Hillman
- Spin-off appearances: Coronation Street: Text Santa Special (2013)
- Crossover appearances: The Jeremy Kyle Show (2010); Corriedale (2026)
- Thomas Ormson as David Platt (2000)
In-universe information
- Other names: David Tilsley
- Occupation: Hairdresser; Businessman; Barber
- Father: Martin Platt
- Mother: Gail Platt
- Stepfather: Richard Hillman; Joe McIntyre; Michael Rodwell; Jesse Chadwick
- Half-brothers: Nick Tilsley
- Half-sisters: Sarah Platt; Charlotte Platt
- Wife: Kylie Turner (2011–2016); Shona Ramsey (2019–present)
- Daughters: Lily Platt; Harper Platt
- Adoptive sons: Max Turner
- Stepsons: Clayton Hibbs
- Grandfathers: Barry Platt; Ted Page
- Grandmothers: Barbara Platt; Audrey Roberts
- Uncles: Stephen Reid
- Nephews: Billy Platt; Harry Platt; Sam Blakeman
- Nieces: Bethany Platt
- Other relatives: George Shuttleworth

David Platt (also Tilsley) is a fictional character from the British ITV soap opera Coronation Street. He was born on-screen during the episode broadcast on 26 December 1990. He was played by Thomas Ormson from his first appearance until 15 March 2000, when Ormson left. Jack P. Shepherd took over the role and made his first on-screen appearance on 26 April 2000. In July 2019, Shepherd took a four-month break from the show.

Following the death of his serial killer stepfather Richard Hillman (Brian Capron) and the departure of his biological father, Martin Platt (Sean Wilson), the character took a darker turn in 2006, becoming increasingly rebellious and antagonistic, deprived of a male role model. As a result, he has notably feuded with Phil Nail (Clive Russell), Bill Webster (Peter Armitage), Charlie Stubbs (Bill Ward), Gary Windass (Mikey North), Jason Grimshaw (Ryan Thomas), Callum Logan (Sean Ward) and Clayton Hibbs (Callum Harrison), as well as his sister, Sarah Platt (Tina O'Brien), and mother, Gail Platt (Helen Worth). However, in recent years, he has mellowed into a more comedic and rounded character, focused on what is best for his family, opposed to causing trouble for them. He has been married twice, to Kylie (Paula Lane) and Shona Platt (Julia Goulding).

== Creation ==
=== Casting ===
A character that viewers saw born in the soap, David's birth was part of the Coronation Street Christmas storyline in 1990, since David was days old, and for most of his childhood, the character was played by Thomas Ormson. He was the only child of couple Martin and Gail Platt (Sean Wilson and Helen Worth), although Gail had two children from her first marriage. In 2000, Jack P. Shepherd took over the role. He made his first appearance on 26 April 2000.

== Development ==
This was the first time that male rape had been a storyline in the programme's history, although such a theme had occurred on other soap operas. Ryan Clayton was cast as Josh in January 2018.

In January 2018, it was confirmed that Sean Wilson would be returning to Coronation Street after a thirteen-year absence as David's father Martin as part of the rape storyline.

== Storylines ==
David is the son of Martin (Sean Wilson) and Gail Platt (Helen Worth). He is born on Christmas Day, in 1990. When David is a toddler, Martin's friend, Carmel Finnan (Catherine Cusack), tries to kidnap him. She also poses as his mother to other characters. Carmel subsequently tries to frame Gail for pushing her down the stairs and is revealed to be mentally ill.

In 2000, a nine-year-old David becomes jealous of the attention his newborn niece Bethany Platt (Amy and Emily Walton) is getting. He decides to get attention by having himself arrested for shoplifting. In 2001, Gail and Martin divorce, after Martin has an affair with Rebecca Hopkins (Jill Halfpenny). Upset, David begins misbehaving in the hope that they will get back together. David becomes the target of a school bully and, despite Gail's advice to ignore him, he becomes violent and gets into fights. His behaviour worsens when Gail marries Richard Hillman (Brian Capron) in July 2002, but he comes to accept Richard. In March 2003, Richard is revealed to be a serial killer and tries to kill himself, Gail, David, Bethany and her mother—David's sister—Sarah Platt (Tina O'Brien) by driving them into the local canal. Gail, Sarah, David and Bethany are all rescued, while Richard drowns. In the years following, David develops a penchant for lying and scheming both at home and at school.

David is unhappy with Gail's relationship with Phil Nail (Clive Russell) and does not trust Phil, due to Richard's behaviour. He begins a hate campaign against Phil. Phil reaches a breaking point with David and throws him up against a wall, threatening to beat him up. David tells Gail, but Phil lies to her. Gail believes him and slaps David, unaware that he is telling the truth. Gail receives a card addressed from Richard. She suspects Phil of sending the cards. Realising David is behind the scam, Phil throws David across the table in front of Gail. An angry Gail ends their relationship. The Platt family continue to receive cards from Richard and Gail realises that David is the culprit. Gail blames herself for David's behaviour. In December 2006, David discovers Sarah's grandmother Ivy Brennan's (Lynne Perrie) diary and reads it, and is shocked that Gail had wanted to abort him, but he understands this after Gail told him that Ivy had been having a rough time since the death of her son and Gail's then-husband, Brian Tilsley (Christopher Quinten). He develops romantic feelings for Maria Sutherland (Samia Longchambon), but is annoyed she is enjoying an affair with Charlie Stubbs (Bill Ward). Charlie threatens David into silence. David tries to blackmail Charlie, who tries drowning David in a bath to rid of him, but Maria walks in and saves him. In January 2007, Tracy Barlow (Kate Ford) murders Charlie, staging it to look like self-defence. David offers to testify for Tracy that he saw Charlie attack her on the condition that she sleeps with him. Tracy agrees, but the prosecution proves David's testimony to be lies.

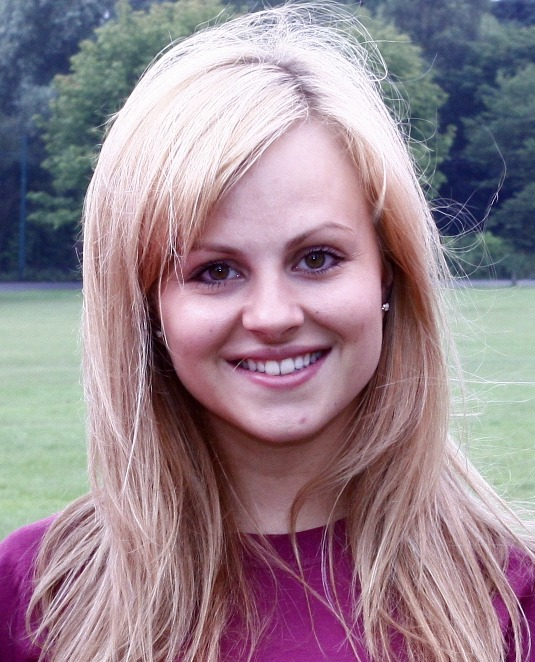
Tina O'Brien (pictured) portrays David's sister, Sarah Platt, with whom David, over the years, has had a difficult relationship.

In September 2007, David picks up some ecstasy tablets from his neighbour, Craig, who had kept them safe for one of his drug dealers. David hides the pills inside one of Bethany's dolls head, later David babysits for Sarah and Gail and leaves her alone to talk to Craig in the garden. However, Bethany finds the pills and ingests one before going into intensive care. The resulting fallout causes David to be kicked out of the house by Gail, along with Sarah banning him from her upcoming wedding. Now unhinged, David drives into the canal. Gail is overcome with guilt as she believes this is a suicide attempt, and is relieved when David turns up alive. She allows him to move back into Number 8, and promises to never let him down again. Sarah is not convinced, and as revenge, she plants pills in David's drawer at the salon, framing him. This causes her to be given a job originally meant for David, and leaves for Milan with Bethany. Jason however, is disgusted when she reveals her plot to him, and he refuses to go with her.

In January 2008, David begins a relationship with Tina McIntyre (Michelle Keegan) and she becomes pregnant. In March 2008, Gail pays for an abortion and they decide not to tell David. He finds out and, in an argument, he accidentally knocks Gail down the stairs. He persuades Tina to give him an alibi, but she ends their romance. David smashes various vehicles and windows on the Street, attacks Ken Barlow (William Roache) and hits a policewoman. He is sentenced to four months in a Young Offenders Institution. When he is released, Tina reconciles with him but faces more issues when a jealous David reads her emails. He dates Amber Kalirai (Nikki Patel) in an attempt to make Tina jealous, which has the desired effect, and they get back together.

In November 2008, David feuds with the Windass family when they refuse to pay for work that Tina's father Joe McIntyre (Reece Dinsdale) has carried out. David threatens Eddie (Steve Huison) and Anna Windass (Debbie Rush) with a crowbar. Len (Conor Ryan) and Gary Windass (Mikey North) steal Joe's work tools in retaliation. David then destroys their kitchen, so the Windass family remove the Platt's kitchen from their house. Gail and Anna are forced to call a truce to avoid more problems. David spends time away from Weatherfield, when Tina wants nothing more to do with him. Upon his return, he becomes jealous of Tina and Gary's friendship. David frames Gary for theft and also tricks him into buying stolen goods. He then enlists Gary to commit robbery, which goes wrong when Gail's father Ted Page (Michael Byrne), interrupts them, calls the police and has a heart attack. Gary decides to confess to the police, which leads to David being arrested. David becomes jealous when Tina begins a relationship with Jason Grimshaw (Ryan Thomas). David discovers that Joe is addicted to prescription medication, and agrees to supply him with drugs, as long as he tries to break Tina, and Jason up. In February 2010, Joe drowns in a boating accident while on his honeymoon in the Lake District, but the police presume that he has been murdered and arrest Gail. David has to scheme in order to prove Gail's innocence. In late 2010, Tina begins a relationship with David's friend Graeme Proctor (Craig Gazey). This upsets David and he feels betrayed. David suffers a black-out while driving and knocks Graeme over. No one believes David's versions of events and the police arrest him for attempted murder. Before the court case is about to begin, David passes out again and everyone begins to realise he was telling the truth. He is found to be suffering from epilepsy.

David returns from a holiday in Tenerife, and announces his engagement to "Candy", aka Kylie Turner (Paula Lane). Gail is angry, and tries to convince David to change his mind, as she does not approve of Kylie. David and Kylie marry in April 2011. David fights to take custody of Kylie's son Max Turner (Harry McDermott), but ends up feuding with her sister Becky McDonald (Katherine Kelly), with Kylie tries to avoid it. David insists that Steve and Becky, are not fit to look after Max, proving this, when he saves Max from being run over. David deals with Gail and Kylie feuding. He learns that Gail tries to bribe Kylie to leave, and he threatens to leave home. Kylie gets a job at the salon with David. David is upset when Max is put up for adoption, and she does not want to prevent it. He tells her, that they must change their ways, and convince social services, to allow Max to live with them.

In August 2013, David discovers that Kylie slept with Nick but does not confront them. He vandalises Nick's flat and writes poison pen letters to his wife Leanne. While in a vehicle together, Nick tells David that he knows that he is behind the trouble, and suggests they discuss it with Kylie. To prevent Kylie from finding out, David tries to stop Nick from driving by unfastening his seat belt, as he knows Nick won't drive with it unfastened, however Nick keeps driving and a few seconds later they are involved in a car accident. Nick is left in a coma, resulting in permanent brain damage. To his relief, David learns he is Lily's biological father, but when Kylie discovers that he is the reason behind Nick's injuries, she throws him out. Following their reconciliation, and a holiday to Barbados to visit Becky, Max's behaviour at home, and at school, gets worse and is diagnosed with ADHD, in August 2014, and Kylie becomes addicted to his medication. In a quest to get to the source of Max's ADHD, she travels to her old haunt, a pub called The Dog & Gun in Wythenshawe, where she grew up. There, she encounters her ex-boyfriend, and Max's biological father, Callum. The pair continue to have secret meetings for weeks, where Kylie is hooked on amphetamine, and Callum demands to see Max. David throws Kylie out after he finds out about her taking drugs, and she leaves Weatherfield on Christmas Day, 2014.

In January 2015, Max's father, Callum Logan, (Sean Ward) arrives and wants access to Max. When David refuses, Callum starts a custody battle, which begins a violent feud. Kylie returns in May 2015, and helps strengthen David's claim to Max. Their feud escalates, and Callum manipulates Sarah, and Bethany (now played by Lucy Fallon). They try to frame Callum for a crime in September 2015, and he attacks Sarah, and Kylie kills Callum, to protect her. David decides to help cover the murder up, and buries the body down a manhole in their home. In May 2016, a car crash results in the discovery of Callum's body, buried beneath the concrete. David is initially the main suspect, but they frame the recently deceased Tony Stewart (Terence Maynard), Jason's father, another of Callum's enemies. In July 2016, Kylie decides she cannot live in the house Callum died in, any longer. David agrees to relocate their family to Barbados, with Kylie. Their plans are ruined when Clayton Hibbs (Callum Harrison), stabs Kylie in the street, and she dies, in David's arms. David then attacks Clayton, who is then charged with Kylie's murder. David seems concerningly calm to Gail, when planning Kylie's funeral.

In October 2016, David wants revenge for Kylie's murder, believing that there will be no justice for her. He publicly names Clayton as Kylie's killer, despite Clayton being fifteen years old. David attempts to kill Macca Hibbs, Clayton's step-brother, whilst he is in hospital. David plans his final act of revenge on Clayton, by crashing his new car into a police van Clayton is in, by igniting a large amount of petrol to blow them both up. Gail, Nick and Sarah see David's suicide note, and lock him inside the cellar of the Bistro until the trial finishes After tricking Gail into thinking that he has committed suicide, David escapes the Bistro, gets into his car that is doused in petrol and drives off. However, as he speeds along, David spots Lily on the road, and swerves to avoid her, but ends up flipping the car, which lands on Lily and Gary (who attempted to rescue Lily). Some of the residents are able to get Gary, and Lily out, and David manages to get out of the car. However, a spark causes the car to catch fire and explodes, setting Anna on fire, leaving her badly injured, while David watches in horror. Sarah admits to Gary, who she is in a relationship with, what David had done, but she persuades him not to tell anyone, for the sake of Max, and Lily. David inherits £20,000 from a client who dies, as well as a dog named after him. Gary finds out from Sarah, about the money, so David gives Anna and Kevin £19,000. In 2017, he begins a relationship with an older woman, Shona Ramsey (Julia Goulding), who he later discovers is Clayton's estranged mother. Despite this, they reconcile after working together, to imprison Shona's ex-boyfriend Nathan Curtis (Christopher Harper) for sexually grooming Bethany. By November 2017, he dramatically changes in appearance, and grows a beard.

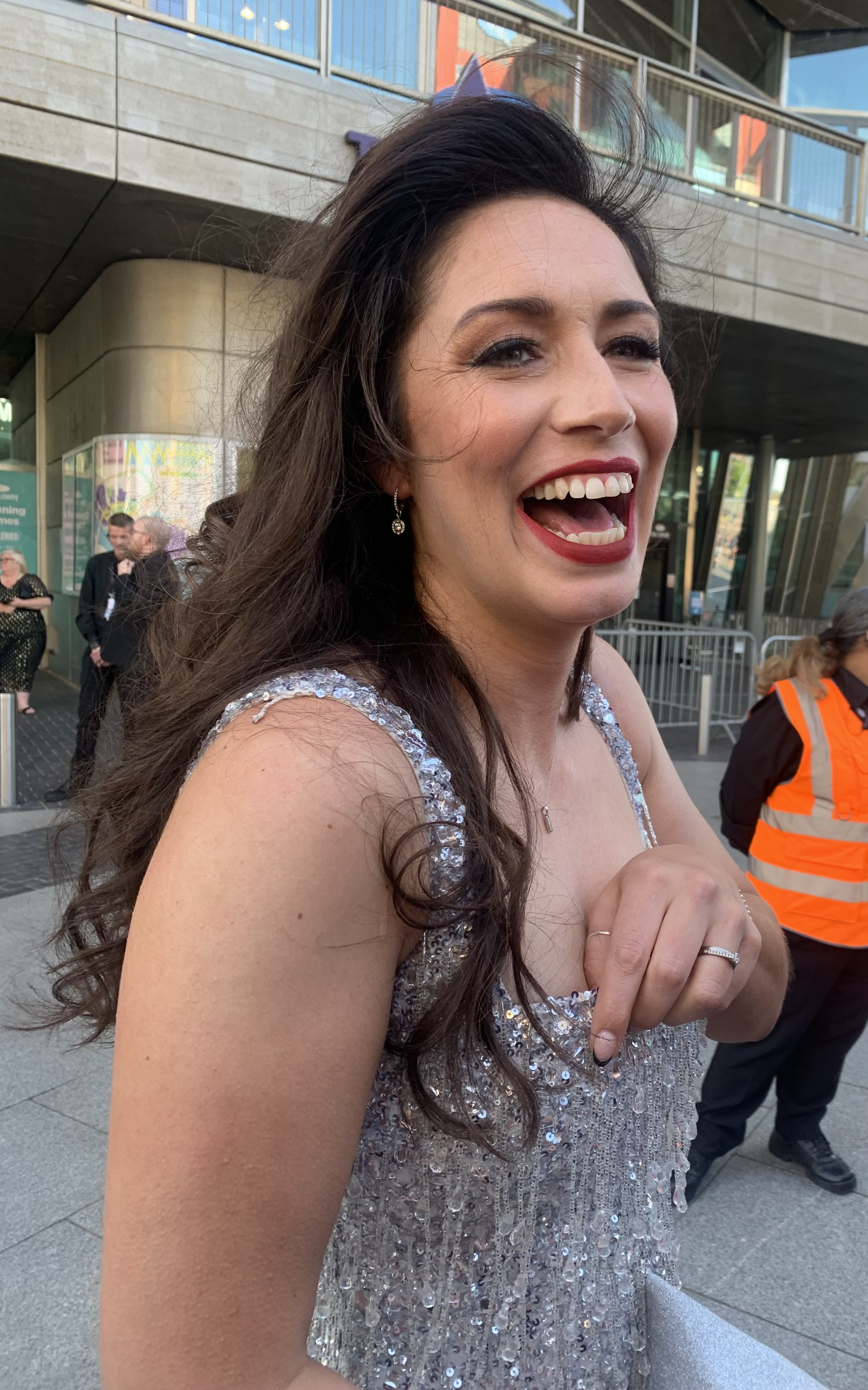
Julia Goulding (pictured) portrays David's second wife, Shona.

In March 2018, David's new friend, Josh Tucker (Ryan Clayton), drugs and rapes him after a nightout. He feels ashamed, and embarrassed, by the ordeal. David, Max and Lily, visit David's dad, Martin, at his home in Liverpool, as he is preparing to emigrate to New Zealand. Martin, senses something is wrong with David, and travels back to Weatherfield to speak to him. Following the rape, David lashes out at everyone, worrying Shona, Gail, Martin, Sarah, Gary, Bethany, and Audrey, as well as many other residents. He takes Tyrone's place in the charity boxing event, where his opponent is Gary. As they fight, David has flashbacks, and he brutally attacks Gary, as everyone watches in horror. Gary fights for his life in hospital. Sarah can't believe that her own brother, would do such a thing. Only David knows that he is suffering mentally, and emotionally, from what Josh did to him. As a result, David breaks up with Shona, saying he doesn't love her anymore. This leads to her moving out, and she moves in with Roy Cropper (David Neilson), at his flat above Roy's Rolls.

David starts a relationship with apprentice hairdresser Emma Brooker (Alexandra Mardell), who is a year older than his niece, Bethany. On the day of his trial for attacking Gary, he runs off, while his solicitor Imran Habeeb (Charlie de Melo), is distracted. Shona finds him, and he reveals his rape to her, after finding out about Aidan Connor's (Shayne Ward) suicide. They get back together and Shona promises to stay by his side. David later tells Gail, and Audrey about the rape, while Gail tells Sarah. While doing community service for beating up Gary, David and another man, make homophobic jibes towards gay vicar Billy Mayhew (Daniel Brocklebank). When Billy later asks him to apologise, David refuses and Billy locks the door. David breaks down, and admits that he was raped. Billy later follows David, when he follows Josh, and a potential victim. Billy tells him to go home, and do nothing. Billy later contradicts himself, and warns the man of Josh. Josh is beaten up by this man, and ends up in hospital. Josh becomes blind, and Billy regularly visits him, out of guilt. Billy then lets Josh live with him, as he has nowhere else to go. David and Shona find out, and are disgusted with Billy. David is furious when he finds out that Bethany knew about Billy visiting Josh, in hospital. After Josh re-evaluates his behaviour, he visits David in the salon, however, he still does not admit to raping him. David kidnaps him, and tricks him into thinking they are outside a police station. When Josh breaks down and pleads that his life would be hell in prison, David gets closure, and tells Josh that they are in an alleyway, and leaves him stranded.

In 2019, Shona's now 18-year-old son Clayton, faces the possibility of being transferred to an open prison in Liverpool, as his safety is being jeopardised at Highfield Prison, with injuries as proof. David is unhappy, as there is a chance of him visiting Weatherfield, on the weekends. Clayton's father, Dane, was tries to get his son transferred before his untimely death, from a drug overdose. Shona decides to attend her ex-partner, Dane's funeral, but lies to David, of her whereabouts. Clayton is unhappy to see Shona there, as he wishes she had died, instead of Dane. The funeral turns out to be a breakout plot, devised by Clayton's stepbrother Macca, with thugs posing as undertakers, cutting Clayton's handcuffs with bolt cutters, and he runs away. Shona is arrested for helping him escape, but denies having a role in his escape plot and is released from custody, shortly afterwards.

In July 2019, Nick steals Audrey's money, and frames David. As a result, David is sentenced to four months in prison, whilst Nick is sentences to 2 years imprisonment, but receives a suspended sentence.

In October 2019, David is due to be released in a few weeks, in the lead up to his release, he befriends a prisoner, named Abe. David goes to take his medication in the medical wing, and to his horror, sees Josh. Abe tells David, that a person named Tez, is planning a prison riot, where they will go and kill Josh. David states he does not want to be involved. During the riot, David stays in his cell but then Josh is forced into the cell by Abe who tells David to stab Josh, of which he refuses. The riot is seen by Shona, Sarah, and Max on the news. David and Josh leave the cell, and Josh kicks Tez (who wants Josh dead) to slow them down. They make it into a room, and barricade the door. David then says that he only saved Josh, for him to suffer. Josh then starts taunting David, after that it isn't known if David stabbed Josh, or not. David later manages to ring Shona, via mobile phone and tells her what happened. She asks if he stabbed Josh, but he doesn't answer. When Shona visits him later, he tells her he didn't do it.

In January 2020, David arrives at Josh's court date, after receiving a letter asking him to testify, as Josh pleaded not guilty. David almost drops it, because Shona is his main priority, but David is convinced by Gail, and goes to testify. David is left worried, after what Josh's solicitor said. Later, his solicitor Imran Habeeb visits David in the hospital, notifying him that Josh was found guilty of raping him, and other people, and that he received a prison sentence of 15 years. David feels relieved.

In March 2025, David asks former prison mate, Andy Garland (Andrew Goth), to kill him by running him over, in order to protect his family from Harvey Gaskell (Will Mellor). Pregnant Daisy Midgeley (Charlotte Jordan), is injured in the incident, resulting in the loss of her baby.

== Reception ==
David is arguably one of Coronation Street's best known characters of its modern era. The "Demon David" phase of his character in the late 2000s received considerable attention. His behaviour included sending greetings cards to his family supposedly from his murderous ex-stepfather Richard Hillman (Brian Capron), setting fire to his GCSE exam paper in front of dozens of his fellow students and driving himself into the canal (mirroring Hillman's attempt to murder his entire family in 2003) in an effort to ruin Sarah and Jason Grimshaw's wedding day. David's antics helped Shepherd to the Inside Soap Award for Best Bad Boy in 2007. The following year he also landed the British Soap Award for Villain of the Year.

For his role as David, Shepherd was longlisted for "Best Actor" at the 2015 Inside Soap Awards. He was then longlisted for "Best Actor" and "Funniest Male" at the 2017 Inside Soap Awards. He did not progress to the viewer-voted shortlist. On 2 June 2018, Shepherd was awarded his first "Best Actor" accolade at The British Soap Awards 2018, following his performances during the rape storyline. In July 2018, Shepherd was longlisted for "Best Actor" and "Best Partnership", alongside Julia Goulding who plays Shona Ramsey, at the Inside Soap Awards. For his portrayal of David, Shepherd was nominated for Best Soap Actor (Male) at the 2018 Digital Spy Reader Awards; he came in third place with 9.5% of the total vote. David's male rape storyline was also nominated in the "Best Soap Storyline" category, while David and Shona's partnership was nominated in the "Best Soap Couple" category. Both nominations came in sixth place with 9.5% and 5.8% of their total votes respectively. In 2019, Shepherd received a National Television Awards nomination in the Serial Drama Performance category for his portrayal of David. Shepherd was longlisted for "Best Comic Performance" at the 2024 Inside Soap Awards. Shepherd was later shortlisted for "Best Comic Performance" at The 2025 British Soap Awards, but lost to EastEnders star Patsy Palmer, who portrayed Bianca Jackson on the soap. Shepherd was also longlisted for "Best Actor" and "Best Comic Performance" at the 2025 Inside Soap Awards.

Fearing real-life imitation of the scene in which David was tortured by Charlie Stubbs, many formal complaints were filed by viewers with the Government's Office of Communications. In the end, Coronation Street was cleared by TV watchdogs after 31 complaints about scenes of 'bullying and torture'".

Tony Stewart of the Daily Mirror refers to the character as "David Pratt" when writing reviews of any storyline he features in, due to the character's way of seemingly always getting away with outlandish things. In magazine articles, he is often referred to as "Demon David", "Teen Tormenter", "Ratboy" or "Psycho Platt".
