= List of Coronation Street characters introduced in 2016 =

The following is a list of Coronation Street characters introduced in 2016, by order of first appearance. All characters are introduced by series producer Stuart Blackburn, or his successor Kate Oates.

== Marta Zarek ==
Marta Zarek
- Coronation Street character
- Portrayed by: Edyta Budnik
- First appearance: Episode 8833; 5 February 2016
- Last appearance: Episode 8865; 21 March 2016
- Introduced by: Stuart Blackburn

Marta Zarek, played by Edyta Budnik, made her first on-screen appearance on 5 February 2016. The character and casting was announced on 29 January 2016. Marta is introduced as part of a modern slavery storyline. Mark Jefferies of the Daily Mirror reported that producers consulted experts to ensure the storyline would be accurate. A spokesperson commented, "Obviously, Coronation Street tries to tackle difficult subjects and has done storylines about serious illnesses and violence before. But this is the first time slavery has appeared."

Aidan Connor (Shayne Ward) and Eva go to a party at the O'Driscolls and drive there in the Underworld van. Marta hides in the back of the vehicle, which takes her to Weatherfield. Once there, she makes her home in the factory, hoping to make herself inconspicuous, but desperation causes her to steal from the staff's belongings and make them believe that there is a thief among them. Eva Price (Catherine Tyldesley) finds and takes pity on her, and starts bringing her food. Marta tells her about how she has been forced into slavery, and that her family in Poland are being threatened by her slavers, later revealed to be Richie (James Midgley) and Julia O'Driscoll (Malgorzata Klara), Underworld's new clients. She is almost found by Kirk Sutherland, whose claims of noises from the back of the factory were being ignored by everyone. Before she can be found, she flees through the assembled group wearing Sean Tully's (Antony Cotton) new coat and pushing over Izzy Armstrong (Cherylee Houston) in her escape.

Marta disappears into the streets, but comes back after several weeks because she is ill and needs help. She is given shelter at 18a Victoria Street but refuses medical attention and attempts to flee again. Billy Mayhew (Daniel Brocklebank) helps Eva stop her from leaving, and Marta tells them her full story and the identity of her persecutors. Eva vows to help the girl retrieve her passport from the O'Driscolls. Eva goes to a dinner party at the O'Driscolls with Aidan to look for it, but she is caught and sacked after the O'Driscolls claim that the girl had stolen from them and been fired. Marta leaves St. Mary's Rectory, and steals £20 from Billy and his mobile phone. Using the tracker app installed on the phone, Billy and Eva find Marta and demand answers. Billy takes her back to the O'Driscolls where Julia greets her and takes her inside, leaving him outside. A few days later, Billy and Eva check on Marta and are told that she had gone home but as they are leaving, Eva believes she sees Marta through an upstairs window. Aidan's suspicions are raised when he sees Julia padlocking a bedroom door during a visit. Billy and Eva try to rescue Marta when the O'Driscolls are at a trade fair, breaking into the house, and find Marta locked in the bedroom. They are caught when the O'Driscolls return early. Richie assaults Billy and Eva, but they are rescued by Aidan who had followed them there. The police are called, and the O'Driscolls are prosecuted for offences under section 1 of the Modern Slavery Act 2015. A few days later, a happy and smartened-up Marta is brought into the Rovers by Aidan to say goodbye and "thank you" to Eva before she returns home to her family.

== Rana Habeeb ==
Rana Habeeb
- Coronation Street character
- Portrayed by: Bhavna Limbachia
- Duration: 2016–2019
- First appearance: Episode 8842; 19 February 2016
- Last appearance: Episode 9736; 31 May 2019
- Introduced by: Stuart Blackburn
In-universe information
- Other names: Rana Nazir
- Occupation: Nurse
- Father: Hassan Habeeb
- Mother: Saira Habeeb
- Brothers: Imran Habeeb
- Husband: Zeedan Nazir (2016–2018)
- Nephews: Alfie Franklin

Rana Habeeb (also Nazir), played by Bhavna Limbachia, made her first on-screen appearance on 19 February 2016. The character and casting was announced on 8 January. In regards to her casting, Limbachia commented "I'm absolutely thrilled to be joining the show. Being a proud Northerner, it's a dream come true." Rana was introduced as a love interest for Zeedan Nazir (Qasim Akhtar) and an old friend of his sister Alya (Sair Khan). Following a visit to catch up with Alya, Rana found employment at the local medical centre. The show's former series producer Stuart Blackburn described Rana as "sharp, funny, utterly gorgeous and not a little manipulative." In January 2019, it was announced Rana would be killed off after Limbachia quit the role, and the character was written off on 20 March 2019.

Rana first appears having a meal with Alya in the bistro, and the latter's brother, Zeedan, becomes attracted to her. Rana flirts with him and Andy Carver (Oliver Farnworth). She leaves, and Alya's grandparents, Sharif (Marc Anwar) and Yasmeen Nazir (Shelley King), ask her to return soon as she brought a lot of happiness back into Alya's life. Rana wants to have sex with Zeedan, but he prefers to wait until after marriage, which they break up and reconcile regularly over. They agree to take their relationship slowly, but Zeedan becomes jealous when she talks to other men. After Zeedan argues with Sharif, he and Rana have a heart-to-heart, which ends in Zeedan proposing to Rana, and her running off. Later, Zeedan asks Rana to forget his proposal, but she says she wants to marry him, and they seal their engagement with a kiss.

Rana supports Zeedan when Sharif is discovered to be having an affair with Sonia Rahman (Sudha Bhuchar), but the revelation forces Zeedan to question his beliefs in marriage, and after an awkward meal with Rana's parents, breaks off their engagement. Rana is crushed and is adamant that this is the end of her relationship with Zeedan, but Leanne Battersby (Jane Danson) helps the pair reconcile. Zeedan and Rana marry immediately, with Rana's parents, Yasmeen, Leanne and Nick Tilsley (Ben Price) witnessing the ceremony.

Zeedan is keen to start a family, but Rana is less certain. Rana secretly begins taking contraceptive pills without his knowledge. When Zeedan refuses to talk to Alya after learning she knew of Sharif's affair, Rana tries to act as peacemaker. She is successful at first, but when the gym where Zeedan works—partly owned by Sharif—shuts down due to Sharif embezzling money to give it to Alya, he makes it clear he cannot forgive his sister. Upset to see her family not getting along, Yasmeen also pressures Rana to have a child, hoping it will bring everyone together. Rana snaps and reveals she is not ready for children yet after Yasmeen buys her an ovulation predictor kit.

In September 2017, Rana falls out with her close friend, lesbian Kate Connor (Faye Brookes), when Kate thinks Rana is homophobic. Rana keeps out of Kate's way until she breaks up with her girlfriend, and they make up. After getting drunk Rana kisses Kate admitting to her she is confused about her feelings although she tells Zeedan she wants to try for a baby. Despite having feelings for Kate, Rana tries to move on and gets married properly to Zeedan, as their first marriage was not officially legal and on the wedding day deletes a voicemail Kate leaves telling her that she loves her. A few weeks later, Rana and Kate confess their love for each other and they passionately kiss, with Rana telling Kate she will tell Zeedan. She does not, and when Luke Britton (Dean Fagan) finds out he tells her to tell Zeedan, herself. She lies and says she is pregnant to get him off her back. Rana and Kate continue their affair, but they are discovered when Kate's cousin, Michelle Connor (Kym Marsh), robs the bistro and spots them together. Michelle blackmails Kate, saying that if she goes to the police about her committing the robbery she will tell Zeedan about the affair. Michelle and Kate later make up and Michelle starts letting Rana and Kate use her and Robert Preston's (Tristan Gemmill) flat for them to continue their affair. Robert discovers the two together one night, but keeps it a secret. In January 2018, Rana confesses her love for Kate to Zeedan, and he ends their marriage, and forces her to give her wedding ring back to him. A few days later Zeedan forces Rana to confess about her affair to her parents, disgusting the both of them. Rana's father Hassan makes a deal with Zeedan: if he and Rana pretend to be married for the next year in order to maintain the family's reputation, he will make Zeedan's business venture happen. Although initially reluctant, Rana agrees. In March 2018, Kate visits Rana and they kiss which Zeedan sees. After she picks Kate over her family, Hassan disowns her. When Hassan has a stroke, Rana's mother Saira stops her from seeing him in hospital and she has to lie that she is no longer with Kate to see him just as he dies.

Later in 2018, Kate and Rana propose to each other at the same time. The engagement is called off when the two discuss having a child; Rana does not want a child, causing the two of them to split up. They eventually get back together as a couple on New Year's Eve and re-plan their wedding and life together.

On 20 March 2019, Rana dies with Kate by her side on their wedding day after being trapped under the rubble in the Underworld factory collapse. During the investigation into the roof collapse, the cause is determined to be sabotage. On 31 May 2019, her ghost returns to haunt Carla Connor (Alison King), who knew the factory roof was unsafe because of fire damage and whose mental health was spiralling out of control. On the same day, her murderer is revealed to be Gary Windass (Mikey North).

== Lauren ==
Lauren
- Coronation Street character
- Portrayed by: Shannon Flynn
- First appearance: Episode 8852; 4 March 2016
- Last appearance: Episode 9003; 30 September 2016
- Introduced by: Stuart Blackburn
In-universe information
- Occupation: Student
- Father: Phil
- Mother: Lorane

Lauren, played by Shannon Flynn, made her first on-screen appearance on 4 March 2016. Lauren and Shelley bully Bethany Platt (Lucy Fallon): Lauren pulls Bethany's hair and makes remarks about Bethany and her mother Sarah Platt (Tina O'Brien); sends cruel messages with Shelley to Bethany online; and follows Bethany home with some of her friends, but Luke intervenes and forces them to leave. When Sarah learns of Bethany's bullying, she visits Lauren at her home and confronts both Lauren and Lorane (Lisa Moore). Lauren and her friends steal Bethany's phone and on another occasion, they insult Bethany's brother, Harry, calling him unplanned and ugly, which causes Bethany's uncle Nick to lose his temper at Lauren, shouting at her and throwing her swim bag on the pavement, damaging an expensive bottle of shampoo. Lauren apologises to Bethany, but the latter learns it is insincere when Lauren and her gang taunt Bethany about Sarah's mental health, but leave when Anna arrives.

Later in 2016, Lauren harasses Bethany at the local gym, causing Bethany to lash out at her. The gym's manager and Anna's son, Gary Windass (Mikey North), appears and forces Lauren to leave. During a meeting at school, Lauren and Bethany are suspended after Lauren tricks their headmaster into thinking that Bethany is bullying her. Lauren later harasses Bethany at her great-grandmother Audrey Roberts' (Sue Nicholls) salon, but Bethany's uncle David Platt (Jack P. Shepherd) offers to bury the hatchet by giving Lauren a free haircut. After sending Bethany out to get coffee, David cuts off Lauren's hair and threatens to cut her throat if she hurts Bethany again, causing Lauren to flee the salon. Lauren later calls the police on David, but he lies that Lauren changed her mind on her haircut halfway through, with his story being backed up by Gemma Winter (Dolly-Rose Campbell). Lauren is later expelled from school after several other girls in Bethany's year group come forward and admit that Lauren has been terrorising them as well. Lauren's father Phil (James Doherty) later beats up David for hacking off Lauren's hair.

== Freddie Smith ==
Freddie Smith
- Coronation Street character
- Portrayed by: Derek Griffiths
- Duration: 2016–2017
- First appearance: Episode 8857; 11 March 2016
- Last appearance: Episode 9148; 21 April 2017
- Introduced by: Stuart Blackburn
In-universe information
- Occupation: Mechanic
- Wife: Sadie Smith (until 2016)

Freddie Smith, played by Derek Griffiths, made his first on-screen appearance on 11 March 2016. Griffiths auditioned for the role, and the character and his casting were announced on 16 December 2015. Freddie was introduced as "an unlikely new friend" for Kylie Platt (Paula Lane). Freddie's wife, who was a client of Kylie's, died shortly before his on-screen debut. Griffiths left the show after a year, making his final on-screen appearance on 21 April 2017.

Freddie is a widower of his late wife Sadie, an old and valued customer of Audrey Roberts' (Sue Nicholls) salon. When Sadie dies unexpectedly, Freddie asks Kylie to do her nails for the funeral. She arrives at his home and is horrified to see his wife's dead body lying in her coffin in the living room. After running out of the house, he speaks to Kylie and convinces her to do Sadie's nails. In April, Freddie returns and is invited to Harry Platt's christening. He is attracted to Audrey and flirts with her, but she rejects him, telling him they can be friends. He later becomes friends with Audrey's lover Ken Barlow (William Roache). The following month, Kylie asks local mechanic Kevin Webster (Michael Le Vell) to hire Freddie, and tells him all of the things that he has been through for the past few months. Kevin agrees to offer him a job, and Freddie accepts.

In July, Freddie tells Ken that he should invite Audrey to a musical theatre production. After seeing Freddie and Audrey together holding hands in the pub, he tells Audrey that he is going to the performance alone. Freddie later starts drinking with Audrey in the pub regularly, and sees Kylie buying champagne to celebrate her and her husband David Platt (Jack P. Shepherd) emigrating to Barbados. Freddie is left distraught when Kylie is stabbed and killed in the street by Clayton Hibbs (Callum Harrison).

== Harry Platt ==
Harry Platt
- Coronation Street character
- Portrayed by: Woody Illsley (2016); Pixie and Presley Sellars (2016–2017); Freddie and Isaac Rhodes (2017–2024); Carter-J Murphy (2024–2025); Joshua Leavy (2025–present)
- Duration: 2016–present
- First appearance: Episode 8865; 21 March 2016
- Introduced by: Stuart Blackburn
In-universe information
- Father: Callum Logan
- Mother: Sarah Platt
- Stepfather: Adam Barlow
- Half-brothers: Max Turner; Billy Platt
- Half-sisters: Bethany Platt
- Grandfathers: Brian Tilsley; Martin Platt (adoptive)
- Grandmothers: Gail Platt; Marion Logan
- Uncles: Nick Tilsley; David Platt
- First cousins: Lily Platt; Harper Platt; Sam Blakeman; Max Turner (adoptive)
- Other relatives: Audrey Roberts; Stephen Reid; George Shuttleworth

Harry Platt made his first on-screen appearance on 21 March 2016. He was played by Pixie and Presley Sellars, and Woody Illsley. Twins Freddie and Isaac Rhodes took over the role in 2017. He is the son of Sarah Platt and Callum Logan (Sean Ward), and the half-brother of Bethany and Max Turner (Harry McDermott). He is born five weeks early by caesarean section after Sarah goes into labour in Tracy Barlow's (Kate Ford) florist shop. On 9 December 2024, it was announced that the role had been recast to Carter-J Murphy, who replaced the Rhodes twins. Jack P. Shepherd, who plays Murphy's on-screen uncle David Platt, shared the news of his casting with Digital Spy. He told them: "They've just recast the lad who plays Harry. Carter is very, very confident." However, after four months Murphy stepped down from the role due to being cast in Matilda the Musical; he made his final appearance in April 2025. Joshua Leavy replaced Murphy, debuting in the role on 20 October 2025.

In December 2015, Sarah is accidentally struck by Tim Metcalfe's (Joe Duttine) van and is taken to a hospital, where she is told that she is four months pregnant by Callum. She plans to have an abortion, but is talked out of it by Kylie. Todd Grimshaw (Bruno Langley) takes Sarah to the florist to relax after shopping, but as Todd reminisces about Billy, Sarah goes into labour, which annoys Tracy. At the hospital, the doctor wants Sarah to have a caesarean section, but Sarah refuses. Todd persuades Sarah, and she agrees to have one. Her son is born in March 2016. When Callum's mother Marion Logan (Susan Cookson) arrives at the hospital after being told about Sarah's pregnancy by Gemma, Sarah refuses to let her meet her child. Sarah names him Harry from one of Bethany's suggestions. Sarah and Harry are picked up from the hospital by Audrey, and Sarah feels that the others did not want to because of who Harry's father is. In April 2016, Harry is christened with Sarah's brother Nick, Nick's fiancée Carla Connor (Alison King), and Todd as godparents. After Callum's corpse is found under Gail Rodwell's (Helen Worth) annexe in May 2016, Sarah starts behaving irrationally and the family realise she suffers from mental health problems. In June 2016, Sarah changes the house locks and barricades herself with Harry. When she is taken to a hospital, Harry is left in Kylie's care, but Sarah gets a place in a mother and baby unit. In July 2016, Sarah decides to leave the unit when Kylie is stabbed to death, but Bethany persuades Sarah to stay for her and Harry's sake. Sarah discharges herself from the unit and returns home in August 2016.

== Will Chatterton ==
Will Chatterton
- Coronation Street character
- Portrayed by: Leon Ockenden
- Duration: 2016–2017
- First appearance: Episode 8870; 28 March 2016
- Last appearance: Episode 9258; 25 September 2017
- Introduced by: Stuart Blackburn (2016); Kate Oates (2017)
In-universe information
- Occupation: Businessman

Will Chatterton, played by Leon Ockenden, made his first on-screen appearance on 28 March 2016. The character and Ockenden's casting was announced on 8 February 2016. His character is introduced as one of Michelle's former boyfriends. Will left the programme on 25 September 2017 at the end of his storyline.

Will's fiancée Saskia hires Michelle to plan their wedding, and Michelle is surprised to see him again. Saskia leaves for business and the two plan the wedding. With Michelle's husband Steve McDonald (Simon Gregson) away in Spain, Michelle develops feelings for her ex. Steve's mother Liz (Beverley Callard) suspect Will and Michelle were having an affair. Michelle tried to avoid Will by getting Sean to plan the wedding for her, but with Steve's continued absence and Will also developing feelings, it becomes difficult for her to deny her feelings for him. Michelle goes to Will's house one night and kisses him. They go upstairs for sex but Michelle refuses at the last minute, thinking of her marriage to Steve. Will later tells Michelle that he broke up with Saskia for her, but Michelle knows that Steve is the one she wanted and refuses to continue her affair with Will.

Over a month later, Will arrives at The Rovers and is greeted by Michelle's stepdaughter Amy Barlow (Elle Mulvaney). Amy deduces Michelle's affair with Will, and blackmails her. A few days later, Saskia barges into the pub with Will and tells Steve of the affair, who asks them both to leave.

Will returns in June 2017 and sees Michelle in a local café. He learns that though her marriage to Steve is over, she and Robert are together as a couple. He begins a relationship with Maria Connor (Samia Longchambon). After Michelle is drugged and put in her car boot, she and Robert think Robert's former friend Rich Collis is to blame but the culprit is later revealed to be Will, who took advantage of the misunderstanding to get closer to Michelle when Robert is later imprisoned for beating up Rich. When Michelle finds pictures of herself in Will's home she realises he is her stalker. The police refuse to arrest him without evidence so Michelle arranges for Steve and Leanne to break into Will's house to find it. Although Will confesses to Michelle that he was stalking her he becomes violent when he realises Michelle arranged the break-in. An altercation leads to Leanne accidentally falling down the stairs after Will grabs her ankle. Steve arrives and knocks Will unconscious before he can harm Michelle, and Will is arrested after Leanne and Michelle make statements to the police.

== Pablo Duarte ==
Pablo Duarte
- Coronation Street character
- Portrayed by: Shai Matheson
- First appearance: Episode 8881; 13 April 2016
- Last appearance: Episode 8882; 15 April 2016
- Introduced by: Stuart Blackburn
In-universe information
- Wife: Maria Connor (2016–2017)
- Stepsons: Liam Connor Jr. (2016–2017)

Pablo Duarte, played by Shai Matheson, made his first on-screen appearance on 13 April 2016. The character and casting was announced on 3 April 2016 as Maria's secret husband. The character left the show on 17 April, five days after his debut, and appeared in three episodes.

Upon his arrival, Pablo makes an enemy out of Maria's boyfriend Luke. He appears after Maria's return to the Cobbles. Pablo, an Argentinian, married Maria in a marriage of convenience in Cyprus to secure the right to move to the United Kingdom, and assures Luke that he has no romantic designs on Maria because he is gay.

While staying in Cyprus helping her mother, Maria meets Pablo at the local hairdressing salon and they ended up marrying – not because of their love for each other but instead so Pablo could hide that he is gay. The couple flew into England on separate flights so when Maria arrives at Manchester Airport, Pablo would not be spotted with her by Luke. Shortly after their arrival, Luke is about to present Maria a bouquet of flowers, but is heartbroken to see her with another man. Luke gets angry at Maria and he leaves even after Maria tells him the reason behind the marriage. A few days later, Pablo meets with Maria and Luke one final time to tell them that he is moving to London. Despite Pablo's departure, Luke still feels unsure about dating a married woman. Later, Maria publicly embarrasses herself to prove her true love for him. A few months later, Pablo's solicitor advises him that in order for him to stay in the UK she has to see Pablo and Maria together. Maria rushes to London soon after receiving word of Pablo's situation. Later that year, Maria confesses to the police the truth about their marriage, and she is sentenced to 12 months in prison, and is released three months later.

== Lee Mayhew ==
Lee Mayhew
- Coronation Street character
- Portrayed by: Richard Crehan
- Duration: 2016, 2018
- First appearance: Episode 8891; 27 April 2016
- Last appearance: Episode 9400; 9 March 2018
- Introduced by: Stuart Blackburn (2016); Kate Oates (2018)
In-universe information
- Father: Fred Mayhew
- Mother: Sandra Mayhew
- Brothers: Billy Mayhew

Lee Mayhew, played by Richard Crehan, made his first on-screen appearance on 27 April 2016. He is Billy Mayhew's brother.

In April 2016, Lee struggles financially and forces Billy, a vicar, to lend him money. When Eva spots Billy giving Lee money, Billy tells her that he is simply helping out a man in need. On one occasion, Todd spots Billy giving money to Lee, with Billy lying to him that Lee is simply a parishioner who needs help.

Lee goes to the Rovers and attempts to steal Erica Holroyd's (Claire King) handbag before stealing money from the cash till at Preston's Petals. Todd tries to call the police, which forces Billy to admit that Lee is his brother. He tells Todd that Lee is a heroin addict recently released from prison and that their parents are dead. Billy regrets being unable to help Lee and believes that Lee is unlikely to forgive him.

A few weeks later, Todd finds Lee collapsed from a drug overdose, and he and Billy drive him to the hospital. Meanwhile, Billy is going through a difficult patch with his boyfriend Sean, who suspects Billy is cheating with Todd. Todd informs Sean of all the incidents involving Lee, so Billy is forced to be honest with Sean about his fear that people would lose confidence in a vicar with a drug addicted brother. Billy breaks up with Sean as he feels guilt over the secrets he is still hiding.

Lee shows up again a week later to once again ask Billy for money but is refused. Lee notices Sarah, and approaches her claiming that Billy had asked him to keep an eye on her, and lures her into his flat, promising Billy would be there soon. He holds Sarah hostage and tells Billy to bring £1000 in exchange for her release. When Sarah starts talking about Callum, Lee starts threatening her, saying that he was friends with him and would send him after her if she does not do as he says. When she starts having a mental breakdown, Lee pins her to the ground and forces himself on top of her and calls her "mental". Sarah goes on a rampage just as David arrives to rescue her. After the incident, Billy tells Lee he never wants to see him again, with Lee furiously reciprocating.

== Clayton Hibbs ==
Clayton Hibbs
- Coronation Street character
- Portrayed by: Callum Harrison
- Duration: 2016–2017, 2019–2020, 2024
- First appearance: Episode 8940; 8 July 2016
- Last appearance: Episode 11427; 29 November 2024
- Introduced by: Stuart Blackburn (2016); Kate Oates (2017); Iain MacLeod (2019); Verity MacLeod (2024)
In-universe information
- Father: Dane Hibbs
- Mother: Shona Platt
- Stepfather: David Platt
- Half-sisters: Harper Platt
- Grandfathers: Doug Ramsey
- Aunts: Jodie Ramsey

Clayton Hibbs, played by Callum Harrison, made his first on-screen appearance on 8 July 2016. He is the stepbrother of Macca Hibbs (Gareth Berliner), and an old friend of Gemma Winter (Dolly-Rose Campbell) and Callum Logan (Sean Ward). He was written into the programme especially to align with the departure of Kylie Platt (Paula Lane).

Clayton and Macca harass Gemma at her job at the Prima Doner kebab shop, demanding free kebabs. They do this for several days before being chased off by manager Chesney Brown (Sam Aston). Clayton returns and attempts to pay Gemma with fake notes, but after Chesney takes the blame for her after the first time this happens, Gemma refuses to take them again and forces Clayton out of the shop. He returns later that day, demanding Gemma open the till, and knocks her unconscious when she fights back. Gemma's friend, Kylie, tries to help her, but Clayton stabs her in the chest and flees the scene. Kylie dies from her injuries in husband David's arms and Clayton threatens Gemma to stay quiet and to keep Craig Tinker (Colson Smith), who witnessed the event, quiet as well. David overhears Clayton threatening Gemma and chases him with a steel pipe. He pins Clayton to the floor and attacks him with the pipe but Clayton manages to escape again. Gemma and Craig give statements to the police, and Clayton is arrested a few days later.

Clayton stands trial at Weatherfield Crown Court. He is found guilty of Kylie's murder and is sentenced to life imprisonment, with a minimum of 15 years. On the day of the trial, David attempts to drive his car into the prison van to kill Clayton, but crashes his car at the end of the street to avoid hitting his daughter Lily (Brooke Malonie). The car explodes and Anna Windass' (Debbie Rush) legs are severely burnt. Months later, Shona Ramsey (Julia Goulding), Clayton's mother, visits him in prison. Shona tells Clayton the grief she has brought on the Platt family. Shona tells Gail that she is Clayton's mother and that Clayton chose to live with his father, believing that he would not be in prison if she had looked after him herself. Gail agrees not to tell anyone about Shona and Clayton in exchange for her not telling the police about David and the car crash.

During the time of his appearance, he has been introduced on many occasions. In May 2020, she is granted a visit to the prison to see Clayton, which she soon recognises and proclaims that "he's not her boy".

== Vinny Ashford ==
Vinny Ashford
- Coronation Street character
- Portrayed by: Ian Kelsey
- Duration: 2016–2018
- First appearance: Episode 8961; 5 August 2016
- Last appearance: 29 March 2018
- Introduced by: Stuart Blackburn (2016); Kate Oates (2017, 2018)
In-universe information
- Other names: Harvey McArdle
- Occupation: Con artist Businessman
- Mother: Flora McArdle

Harvey McArdle, better known as Vinny Ashford, played by Ian Kelsey, made his first on-screen appearance on 5 August 2016. The character and Kelsey's casting was announced on 17 June 2016. Vinny is a property developer, who teams up with his old friend Pat Phelan (Connor McIntyre). Vinny was billed as the show's newest villain, and Kelsey described him as 'an old fashioned confidence trickster'.

Vinny first turns up to tell Phelan about his flat development plan – Calcutta Street – and find out whether he is interested in investing. Later that day, the pair meet to discuss the financial aspects of the project. Pat assures Vinny that he will be able to raise the money, though it will take some time. After learning that his former partner Jason Grimshaw (Ryan Thomas) inherited money from his late father, Pat manages to persuade his mother Eileen (Sue Cleaver) to agree to invest in the scheme. Vinny later tells Pat the truth about his scheme: the flats were not actually going to be built and that his plan was just an attempt to con people out of the money they would be putting up front for deposits. Pat agrees to help Vinny put his Calcutta Street scheme into practice.

Later in the month, Vinny appears unannounced on the same day that Eileen is due back from visiting Jason in Thailand. When Pat tries to stall again, Vinny realises that the investment capital is not actually his own money in the first place and warns Pat that the clock is ticking since there are plenty of others lined up to invest. However, it turns out that Jason looked over the details and decided to invest his £65,000 in the development. Phelan phones Vinny to confirm that it has been confirmed, and tells him that he will get the money as soon as it clears the bank.

In mid-November 2016, towards the conclusion of their Calcutta Street development, Vinny's scheme is discovered by Pat's two archenemies: Michael Rodwell (Les Dennis) and Anna, both of whom plot to bring down Pat and Vinny. When Pat discovers this conspiracy, he threatens Anna before confronting Michael at Vinny's site office; his showdown with the latter causes Michael to die of a heart attack in order to prevent him from exposing Calcutta Street. Pat later phones Vinny to inform him of Michael's death following his constant interference, and that the pair should think about leaving Weatherfield with all the despots. Vinny agrees and instructs Phelan to meet up at his place to finalise their plans; before Pat arrives, Vinny betrays him by leaving early in the morning – taking all the stolen money with him; Pat later informs the Calcutta Street victims about this, solely implicating Vinny for both the scam and Michael's death.

In October 2017, Vinny is revealed to be an alias: his actual name is Harvey McArdle, which Pat discovers when he ends up meeting his Harvey's mother Flora (Eileen Davies) during his campaign to stop local journalist Daniel Osbourne (Rob Mallard) from investigating Calcutta Street; he uses this opportunity to blackmail Vinny to return to Weatherfield, surprising him when he calls his mother on her birthday. Before returning, Vinny hires a hitman to kill Pat, but it fails when Vinny runs into Pat instead of Flora upon arriving at her care home. Pat punches Vinny before giving him an ultimatum: either Vinny delivers the money within a day, or Phelan kills Flora to show him exactly how "he's not the same man who got ripped off". Vinny delivers the money to Phelan, only to be knocked out and subsequently captured; Pat tells Vinny that he is not safe despite the fact that his mother is unharmed, and brings him to an abandoned house, where Phelan has been keeping Andy for nearly the entirety of 2017 since he learned the truth about Calcutta Street and Michael's death. When Vinny awakens, he is surprised to meet Andy, who accuses him of murdering Michael; before abducting Vinny, Pat manipulated Andy into believing that Vinny is responsible for Michael's death. Pat returns and takes the two to a warehouse, where Andy is staged to murder Vinny there. Upon arrival, Vinny sneaks up on Pat and attacks him, who manages to knock Vinny unconscious before forcing Andy to drag him into the warehouse. When Vinny slowly regains consciousness, Pat forces Andy to shoot him dead and he complies, killing Vinny. Shortly afterwards, Phelan kills Andy before disposing of his and Vinny's body in a lake.

== PC Ravinder Rawani ==
PC Ravinder Rawani
- Coronation Street character
- Portrayed by: Jag Sanghera
- Duration: 2016–2019, 2021, 2023, 2025–present
- First appearance: Episode 8964; 8 August 2016
- Introduced by: Stuart Blackburn (2016); Kate Oates (2017, 2018); Iain MacLeod (2021, 2023); Kate Brooks (2025)
In-universe information
- Occupation: Police Constable

PC Ravinder Rawani, portrayed by Jag Sanghera, is a policeman who first appeared on 8 August 2016 and has appeared in twelve episodes since. His most recent appearance was on 13 September 2023 when Stu Carpenter (Bill Fellows) accidentally struck Rawani on the nose whilst trying to gain entry to Dom Everett's (Darren Morfitt) flat during a custody battle with him over Dom's daughter and his granddaughter, Eliza Woodrow (Savannah Kunyo). He was subsequently arrested but later let off with a warning.

Sanghera's return was announced by The Mirror on 3 October 2025, however it wasn't revealed when exactly he would return. However, Daniel Bird from The Mirror revealed: "Corrie is often filmed months in advance. Famous, the Christmas season is often filmed in the autumn months in order to keep a consistent output throughout the year." Sanghera's return was confirmed by his management Nicola Bolton Management in an Instagram post: "Our JAG SANGHERA @therealjagsanghera has been back @itv @coronationstreet filming! #PCRavinderRawani."

== Sonia Rahman ==
Sonia Rahman
- Coronation Street character
- Portrayed by: Sudha Bhuchar
- First appearance: Episode 8973; 22 August 2016
- Last appearance: Episode 9032; 10 November 2016
- Introduced by: Kate Oates
In-universe information
- Husband: Tariq Rahman

Sonia Rahman, played by Sudha Bhuchar, made her first on-screen appearance on 22 August 2016. The character and casting was announced on 16 August 2016, and was in a storyline with Sharif. She was written off on 10 November 2016 at the conclusion of her storyline.

Sonia arrives while Sharif and Yasmeen celebrate their 45th wedding anniversary. She reveals that her husband kicked her out when he became suspicious of her. Yasmeen offers to let her to stay until she is able to support herself, but Sharif secretly disagrees with his wife, but tells Sonia. Sonia and Sharif have been having an affair for seven years, and her husband suspected it. One day, when Yasmeen leaves the house, Sharif gives into temptation and has sex with Sonia again, but after Sonia insults Yasmeen, he snaps at her. He later apologises, and their intimacy is noticed by his granddaughter Alya. Sharif admits the affair to Alya, with her becoming increasingly hostile towards Sonia. Yasmeen soon believes that she and Sharif should purchase a flat for Sonia in order for her to live in before getting herself sorted. Alya blackmails Sharif for £14,000 in order for her to remain silent about his affair with Sonia. Now struggling financially due to Alya's blackmail, Sharif asks Dev Alahan (Jimmi Harkishin) if Sonia can stay in the flat above his corner shop, frustrating Sonia as she wanted a "love nest" for her and Sharif.

When Sonia confronts Sharif, they recall their long-lasting affair before leaving again; however they are unaware that they have been overheard by Yasmeen. At Zeedan's engagement party to Rana, Yasmeen exposes Sharif and Sonia's affair to their family and party guests, before asking everybody to leave. She then kicks Sonia out and confronts Sharif. When Zeedan and Alya return, Sharif reveals that Alya blackmailed him, hurting Yasmeen as she was the person whom she confided in after discovering the affair. Yasmeen then kicks Sharif and Alya out, and Sharif leaves Weatherfield without informing his family or Sonia. When Sonia bumps into Zeedan, he angrily exclaims how she has destroyed their family, and that Sharif has gone and will never return. This devastates Sonia, who decides to leave Weatherfield. Dev is furious that Sharif fled, and demands the £14,000 he took from their business to pay Alya from Sonia, but she explains that she has no money. As her taxi arrives, Sonia attempts one last time to repair her friendship with Yasmeen, but when she explains how much she loved Sharif, Yasmeen angrily slaps Sonia and orders her to leave Weatherfield and never return.

== Darryl Parkins ==
Darryl Parkins
- Coronation Street character
- Portrayed by: Paul Loughran
- Appears in: Episode 8990; 14 September 2016
- Introduced by: Kate Oates
In-universe information
- Wife: Beth Tinker (1998–2016)
- Sons: Craig Tinker

Darryl Parkins, played by Paul Loughran, is the estranged father of Craig Tinker (Colson Smith) who has been in and out of prison. The character and Loughran's casting were announced on 24 August 2016. Craig receives a letter from Darryl asking Craig to visit him in prison. During the visit, Craig reveals that he has a stepfather, Kirk Sutherland (Andrew Whyment), whom his mother Beth Tinker (Lisa George) is married to. Darryl reveals that Beth is still married to him, making her a bigamist.

Upon Loughran's casting, Carl Greenwood from The Mirror described Darryl to be "played by a very familiar face" due to his famous role playing Butch Dingle in ITV's other soap opera, Emmerdale. Greenwoood also described Darryl's character to be "mysterious." Katie Fitzpatrick from Manchester Evening News described Loughran to be "crossing the Pennines from Emmerdale to Corrie" after playing roles in both soaps.

== Tommy Orpington ==
Tommy Orpington
- Coronation Street character
- Portrayed by: Matt Milburn
- Duration: 2016, 2018–2021, 2023–2025
- First appearance: Episode 9005; 3 October 2016
- Last appearance: Episode 11507; 12 March 2025
- Introduced by: Stuart Blackburn (2016); Kate Oates (2018); Iain MacLeod (2019, 2020, 2021, 2023); Kate Brooks (2025)
In-universe information
- Occupation: Professional Footballer; Painter
- Wife: Chantelle (backstory)

Thomas "Tommy" Orpington, played by Matt Milburn, is a local football star who hires Michelle Connor (Kym Marsh) to plan and oversee his wedding. The character and Milburn's casting were announced on 27 September 2016. During his time in Weatherfield, he became friends with Michelle's husband Steve McDonald (Simon Gregson) and Tim Metcalfe (Joe Duttine), igniting a feud between the two of them. Tommy was struck off from work for six months after an accident playing football in the street. As a result, he and his fiancée fired Michelle as their wedding planner. In June 2021, Tommy retired from playing football, and James Bailey (Nathan Graham) was promoted to the number 9 shirt in his place.

On 30 October 2023, it was announced that Milburn would reprise his role as Tommy on 25 December of that year. Talking to Digital Spy, Coronation Street producer Iain MacLeod told them "You'll see Tommy again on Christmas Day! Since leaving football, he has made some bad business investments, including opening a Tommy Orpington-themed gourmet burger restaurant. They've all gone belly up!" Milburn's return was announced the same day as three other characters, Linda Hancock (Jacqueline Leonard), Harvey Gaskell (Will Mellor) and Damon Hay (Ciaran Griffiths).

In 2024, Tommy has an affair with Tracy McDonald (Kate Ford). While he was sleeping with Tracy, Gav Adetiba (Noah Olaoye) was cleaning windows and Tim Metcalfe (Joe Duttine) went up the ladders to show him it wasn't scary and he saw Tracy and Tommy in bed together. Tim informs his best friend and Tracy's husband Steve McDonald (Simon Gregson) of what he saw, and Steve and Tracy ultimately separate. It was later confirmed that Milburn had quit the role and Orpington would be moving to coach a football team in Spain. In January 2025, it was announced that Milburn would be reprising the role of Tommy for one episode in March 2025.

== Seb Franklin ==
Seb Franklin
- Coronation Street character
- Portrayed by: Harry Visinoni
- Duration: 2016–2021, 2025
- First appearance: Episode 9,010; 10 October 2016
- Last appearance: Episode 11,497; 18 February 2025
- Introduced by: Kate Oates (2016); Kate Brooks (2025)
In-universe information
- Other names: Sebastian Franklin
- Occupation: Labourer
- Father: Tez Wyatt
- Mother: Abi Webster
- Stepfather: Kevin Webster
- Half-brothers: Charlie Franklin; Alfie Franklin
- Half-sisters: Lexi Franklin

Seb Franklin, played by Harry Visinoni, first appeared on 1 October 2016 and initially departed in scenes broadcast on 7 May 2021 after he was killed in an attack involving him and his girlfriend Nina Lucas (Mollie Gallagher). He reprised his role for flashback scenes on 30 August 2021. In January 2025, it was announced that Visinoni had reprised the role for a guest appearance, where Seb will reappear as a hallucination to his mother, Abi Webster (Sally Carman), during her mental health struggles.

Seb forms a relationship with Faye Windass (Ellie Leach), who invites him over as she helps her friend Izzy Armstrong (Cherylee Houston) look after her son Jake (Seth and Theo Wild). The couple are caught kissing by Faye's adoptive mother, Anna (Debbie Rush), who confronts her for possibly being pregnant again after she gave birth to Miley the previous year. A few days later, Faye meets up with Seb, apologising for Anna's actions, and goes for a meal at the bistro with the family. Seb appears with an expensive gift. Once the meal finishes, Faye sees Seb off on the bus back home. He becomes friends with Pat Phelan (Connor McIntyre) after stealing a drill from his back garden. A few months later he is arrested after assaulting Faye's ex-boyfriend Jackson Hodge (Rhys Cadman). Months later, it is revealed that he is living in squalor at home, with him being left to care for his young twin siblings. Seb gets into a relationship with Nina. One night while walking, they run into Corey Brent (Maximus Evans) and his gang, who insult Nina's appearance. They brutally attack Nina and Seb when they try to escape. They are both taken to a hospital and although Nina regains consciousness, Seb falls into a coma and is eventually pronounced dead.

== DS MacKinnon ==
DS MacKinnon
- Coronation Street character
- Portrayed by: Sandra Huggett
- Duration: 2016–2019
- First appearance: 2 November 2016; Episode 9026
- Last appearance: 16 December 2019; Episode 9953
- Introduced by: Stuart Blackburn
In-universe information
- Occupation: Detective Sergeant

DS MacKinnon, played by Sandra Huggett, first appears in November 2016, DS MacKinnon when she investigates Maria after suspicions arose over the disappearance of her flatmate Caz Hammond (Rhea Bailey). Believing Caz to have been murdered by Maria, MacKinnon has her arrested. It is later revealed that Caz is alive and is framing Maria in an act of revenge for being evicted. Despite being released on the charge of murder, Maria is arrested again, as she reveals to MacKinnon during an interview that she had organised a sham marriage between herself and Pablo in order to grant him residence in the country. Maria is ordered to serve a 12-month custodial sentence, but ends up serving a couple of months before she is released.

MacKinnon is the lead officer investigating an attack on Ken in March 2017. MacKinnon suspects that someone close to Ken is behind the attack, and calls for an interview with all of Ken's closest relatives, Peter Barlow (Chris Gascoyne), Tracy Barlow, Adam Barlow (Sam Robertson), and Daniel Osborne. While investigating the family, she is led to believe that the attacker was Pat, due to countless reports of him and Ken arguing over the building work going on at No. 1. MacKinnon releases Pat after Todd provides CCTV footage of his whereabouts at the time that Ken was attacked. After arresting and charging both Tracy and Adam for the attack, she realises that Daniel is the real culprit, but he is declared psychologically unwell, and Ken promises to tell the jury that he tripped and fell in court to protect him. MacKinnon is forced to drop the case.

She later returns in September 2018 after Cormac Truman (Joe Mallalieu) suspiciously dies from a drug overdose, and interviews Ryan Connor (Ryan Prescott) and Sophie Webster (Brooke Vincent), who were both present at the time. When Sophie confesses that Ryan asked her to lie about the timeline of events, MacKinnon finds pills planted in Ryan's coat pocket by Cormac, and he is arrested for supplying Cormac with the lethal overdose. After Cormac's father, Ronan Truman (Alan McKenna) is killed in a car accident involving Ryan, his adoptive brother Ali Neeson (James Burrows) and Michelle, MacKinnon is assigned to investigate the circumstances surrounding the crash. She initially suspects Ali of being directly involved with Ronan's death (unbeknownst to her that Ali actually murdered Ronan to protect his family), but she later arrests Abi Franklin (Sally Carman) for tampering with Michelle's car which caused the crash, unaware that it was actually Tracy who wrecked the car to get revenge on Abi.

MacKinnon returns in December 2019 when a pregnant Vicky Jefferies (Kerri Quinn) suddenly vanishes following a physical altercation with her ex-fiancée, Robert Preston. She questions Michelle, Robert's other fiancée, before arresting and charging Robert on suspicion of murdering Vicky. It is later revealed that Vicky is alive and hiding out at a nearby hotel, with both her and Michelle framing Robert for Vicky's murder as punishment for his infidelity.

== Saira Habeeb ==
Saira Habeeb
- Coronation Street character
- Portrayed by: Kim Vithana
- Duration: 2016–2019, 2022
- First appearance: 4 November 2016; Episode 9027
- Last appearance: 18 September 2022; Episode 10745/6
- Introduced by: Stuart Blackburn
In-universe information
- Sisters: Reena
- Husband: Hassan Habeeb (until 2018)
- Sons: Imran Habeeb
- Daughters: Rana Habeeb
- Grandsons: Alfie Franklin

Saira Habeeb, played by Kim Vithana, is the mother of Rana (Bhavna Limbachia) and Imran Habeeb (Charlie De Melo), who appears intermittently between 2016 and 2019, and then returned for another stint in 2022.

She first appears alongside her husband Hassan Habeeb (Kriss Dosanjh) between 4 and 30 November 2016 for Rana's engagement party to Zeedan Nazir (Qasim Akhtar), which doesn't go to plan as his grandfather Sharif Nazir (Marc Anwar)'s affair with Sonia Rahman (Sudha Bhuchar) was exposed by his grandmother Yasmeen Nazir (Shelley King), which causes Zeedan to question whether he wants to marry Rana or not and calls the wedding off. Saira and Hassan blame Rana for the cancellation. However, when Zeedan decides he does want to marry her, they get married on 17 November 2017 and Saira returns for the wedding. The marriage doesn't work out and Rana begins a relationship with Kate Connor (Faye Brookes), which Saira discovers when she returns with Hassan in January 2018. As a result, they disown Rana as they believe her same sex relationship has brought shame onto the family, so Saira plans to abduct Rana and have her sent to Pakistan, but this was stopped by Kate, Zeedan, Yasmeen and Imran, who in turn disowned his parents for disowning his sister. Kate had Saira arrested for the abduction, but the charges were subsequently dropped.

Saira returns again in August 2018 when Hassan suffers a stroke on his 60th birthday and blames Rana for causing it. Rana then lies about splitting up with Kate so she can be at her father's bedside and he passes away a week later. This is when Rana then reveals that she and Kate won't split up. Rana was killed when the roof of the factory collapsed in March 2019, so Saira appears between 24 and 27 March for her funeral, which Imran wasn't pleased about, especially when she tried to keep Kate away from it, but she eventually let her attend. Imran gave his mother one last chance to do the right thing, but she left afterwards. Saira then returns for her most recent stint between 6 June and 18 September 2022 when Imran is killed in a car crash. Saira decides to pay Imran's wife Toyah Battersby (Georgia Taylor) a visit, but is upset to find that she has a grandson called Alfie Franklin. Saira wanted Imran to have a Muslim funeral, just like Rana, but Toyah was against it as he wasn't religious. Saira respected Toyah's wishes and afterwards departed Weatherfield for good.

== Hassan Habeeb ==
Hassan Habeeb
- Coronation Street character
- Portrayed by: Kriss Dosanjh
- Duration: 2016, 2018
- First appearance: 4 November 2016; Episode 9027
- Last appearance: 17 August 2018; Episode 9537
- Introduced by: Stuart Blackburn
In-universe information
- Wife: Saira Habeeb (until 2018)
- Sons: Imran Habeeb
- Daughters: Rana Habeeb
- Grandsons: Alfie Franklin

Hassan Habeeb is the father of Rana (Bhavna Limbachia) and Imran Habeeb (Charlie De Melo), who appears alongside his wife Saira (Kim Vithana) between 4 and 30 November for Rana's engagement party and wedding to Zeedan Nazir (Qasim Akhtar). The latter of which was cancelled due to Zeedan's doubts after his grandfather Sharif Nazir (Marc Anwar)'s affair with Sonia Rahman (Sudha Bhuchar) was exposed by his grandmother Yasmeen Nazir (Shelley King). Hassan was played by Kriss Dosanjh. After the cancellation of the wedding, he and Saira leave Weatherfield and blame Rana for it. Zeedan subsequently decides he does want to marry Rana, but Hassan doesn't attend the wedding, whereas Saira does.

Hassan appears again between 8 January and 17 August 2018 when he returns to Weatherfield with his wife and is shocked when they discover that Rana is in a relationship with Kate Connor (Faye Brookes). As a result, they disown Rana as they believe her same sex relationship has brought shame onto the family, so Saira plans to abduct Rana and have her sent to Pakistan, but this was stopped by Kate, Zeedan, Yasmeen and Imran, who in turn disowned his parents for disowning his sister. Kate had Saira arrested for the abduction, but the charges were subsequently dropped. In August, Hassan suffers a stroke on his 60th birthday and Saira blames Rana for it. Rana then lies about splitting up with Kate so she can be at her father's bedside and he passes away a week later.

== Shona Platt ==
Shona Platt
- Coronation Street character
- Portrayed by: Julia Goulding
- Duration: 2016–present
- First appearance: Episode 9059; 16 December 2016
- Introduced by: Kate Oates
- Crossover appearances: Corriedale (2026)
In-universe information
- Other names: Shona Ramsey
- Occupation: Café waitress
- Father: Doug Ramsey
- Half-sisters: Jodie Ramsey
- Husband: David Platt (2019–present)
- Sons: Clayton Hibbs
- Daughters: Harper Platt
- Stepsons: Max Turner (adoptive)
- Stepdaughters: Lily Platt

Shona Platt (also Ramsey), played by Julia Goulding, made her first on-screen appearance on 16 December 2016. In August 2017, Goulding was nominated for Best Newcomer at the Inside Soap Awards, and was later on the viewer-voted shortlist. On 6 November 2017, Goulding won the "Best Newcomer" accolade at The Inside Soap Awards 2017. Goulding took maternity leave from the show in late 2019 with Shona off-screen from February to May 2020. Goulding took her second maternity leave from the show in late 2022 with Shona departing in January 2023.

Shona meets David Platt (Jack P. Shepherd) in a nightclub and flirts with him, but when he leaves, Shona steals his wallet and disappears. Billy Mayhew (Daniel Brocklebank) comes across Shona in the church on Christmas Day 2016, who confesses to him. Billy takes her back to No. 11, and provides for her, making him want to return to the church. She starts to live at Billy and Eileen Grimshaw's (Sue Cleaver) house and is persuaded by Billy to return David's wallet to his house. Shona begins working for Roy Cropper (David Neilson) at his café.

Shona overhears David's sister Sarah Platt (Tina O'Brien) and mother Gail Rodwell (Helen Worth) talk about money that David inherited and gave to Anna Windass (Debbie Rush), as he was responsible for causing Anna's burns in a horrific car accident the previous year. Shona threatens to tell the police the truth. Shona goes to the prison to visit Clayton Hibbs (Callum Harrison), her son. She tells Clayton the grief she has brought on the Platt family by stabbing David's wife Kylie (Paula Lane) to death in the street, and reveals to Gail that she is Clayton's mother and that Clayton chose to live with his father, believing that he would not be in prison if she looked after him. Gail agrees not to tell anyone about Shona and Clayton in exchange for her not telling the police about David who tries to kiss her after he gets drunk. Gail tries to pay Shona to leave the street, but she refuses, after seeing how upset Roy would be without her. After finding out Nathan Curtis (Christopher Harper) is David's niece Bethany Platt's (Lucy Fallon) fiancé, she goes to his tanning salon and warns her to stay away from him knowing he is a sex trafficker after being involved with him before. Nathan orders someone to beat Shona, and as she is trying to phone the police about Nathan, she is brutally attacked by three men and left for dead. After being found by Craig Tinker (Colson Smith), she is rushed to hospital but discharges herself to help Bethany after she hears Craig talk about how he was on his way to help her, and goes to David to warn him that Bethany is in trouble. In hospital, she is visited by David and they kiss. The next day, he finds her at Kylie's grave, and she tells him about Clayton being her son. He asks her to leave the street, and she complies.

Shona returns on the anniversary of Kylie's death to find young girls whom Nathan had previously abused to help Bethany's case against him. David is less than pleased when Shona stays on the street, especially when she goes to visit Clayton in prison. A few days later, they admit their feelings for each other and have sex. After Shona and David begin a relationship, Clayton's father Dane Hibbs (Simon Naylor) arrives on the street and tries to get Shona to give him her £6,000 winnings that she won on a scratchcard. Shona and David briefly break up over Clayton and Dane but get back together shortly afterwards. In April 2018, David breaks up with Shona, saying he "doesn't love her anymore", when unbeknown to her, he had been raped. She moves in with Roy and Carla Connor (Alison King). The following month, David opens up to Shona about being raped by his former friend Josh Tucker (Ryan Clayton) and they get back together; Shona thereafter confronts Josh for what he did and swears revenge on him for David's ordeal.

In February 2019, Shona visits Clayton in prison when she learns Dane died, and Clayton asks her to smuggle drugs into prison for him to prevent him from being beaten up. Shona tries to do so but does not end up doing it. Shona begins receiving threats, and when she goes to Dane's funeral, she finds out that the funeral directors set up an escape for Clayton, who succeeds. A few days later Shona is held hostage by Clayton and she finds out that Dane died smuggling drugs into prison for him. Just as Clayton is about to stab Shona, she stabs him and he is rushed to a hospital. The next day, David proposes to Shona and she accepts. In November 2019, Shona marries David when he is released from prison.

On Christmas Day 2019, Shona is shot by Derek Milligan (Craige Els), one of Gary Windass' (Mikey North) clients, whom he sought to kill for ruining his chances of reconciling with his family. Shona suffers extensive brain damage as a result of the accident and is unaware of who David and the rest of the family are. She is then moved to a rehabilitation centre in Leeds and tells David she does not want to see him as he unsettled her. Months later, she returns home and is still reluctant to be around David. However, he soon reminds her of their memories and time together and they have another "wedding" on Christmas Day 2020.

== Nathan Curtis ==
Nathan Curtis
- Coronation Street character
- Portrayed by: Christopher Harper
- Duration: 2016–2018, 2024
- First appearance: Episode 9065; 25 December 2016
- Last appearance: Episode 11,283/4; 5 June 2024
- Introduced by: Kate Oates (2016); Iain MacLeod (2024)
In-universe information
- Occupation: Gang lord

Nathan Curtis, played by Christopher Harper, was introduced on 25 December 2016 as the ex-boyfriend of Shona Ramsey (Julia Goulding), and as a sinister love interest for Bethany Platt (Lucy Fallon), sparking a highly publicised child grooming and sexual exploitation storyline, inspired by the real-life Rochdale child sex abuse ring case. In August 2017, Harper was nominated for Best Bad Boy at the Inside Soap Awards.

Nathan kicks out Shona, who is taken in by Billy Mayhew (Daniel Brocklebank). Nathan follows Shona to Billy and Todd Grimshaw's (Bruno Langley) house on Christmas Day, and later rescues 16-year-old Bethany when she collapses from an overdose of diet pills in a ginnel. He rushes Bethany to hospital with Tyrone Dobbs's (Alan Halsall) help. After she thanks him, Bethany starts creating hairstyle tutorial videos with Nathan, which become popular, as Nathan's assistant Mel Maguire (Sonia Ibrahim) boosts views and posts comments. She becomes smitten when he hints at a sexual attraction to her. When Bethany makes a video without Nathan's help, Mel floods the video with negative comments. On Nathan's instructions, Mel also persuades Bethany to get a contraceptive implant.

Nathan is arrested on suspicion of abducting a teenage girl and asks Bethany for an alibi. When she refuses but learns he is innocent, he pretends to give her the cold shoulder and instructs Mel to take her out and make her drunk. Nathan picks up an intoxicated Bethany, despite protests from Rana Habeeb (Bhavna Limbachia), and takes her to his flat. As part of his plan, Bethany asks to sleep with him which he agrees to, and he later tells a person on the phone that she is "special". Nathan is arrested for assault and Mel persuades Bethany to provide a false alibi. Nathan later meets Bethany's mother Sarah Platt (Tina O'Brien) and her fiancé Gary Windass (Mikey North), who become concerned when they realise that Nathan is much older than Bethany, but decide not to interfere.

In June 2017, during a party, Nathan has Bethany sleep with three men, including Ian Yardley. Neil tells him that the police are going to raid the flat, and he tries to clear the flat of guests. However, the police arrive and arrest Nathan for GHB and for grooming Bethany. As he is taken away, Nathan tells Bethany that he loves her. Nathan is arrested again. At the police station, Neil threatens Bethany and her family should she reveal his identity.

There is insufficient evidence to convict Nathan, so he is released in July 2017. Later in the month, Bethany reveals her ordeal with Nathan's best friend Neil Clifton (Ben Cartwright). He and Nathan are charged and jailed.

=== Return ===
On 28 April 2024, it was announced that Nathan would be returning as part of Lauren Bolton's (Cait Fitton) disappearance storyline. The storyline was described to be "absolutely full of twists." He first reappears when Bethany sees him at the reconstruction of Lauren's last movements. She had been sent a letter regarding his early release from prison, but due to moving homes, she didn't receive it until after seeing him again. She is then shocked to discover that Nathan has been working on a local building site nearby, now using the name Joe. Roy Cropper (David Neilson) had recently been imprisoned for Lauren's alleged death, but knowing his history of abusing young girls, Bethany is certain that Nathan is behind her disappearance and confronts him in order to get justice for her. Harper described himself to be "emotional" when reflecting on his last appearance of the show. He commented on Nathan's return: "During the 18 months he was in it before, hundreds of people shared with me how the storyline reflected something they, or someone they loved, had lived through. It remains important to keep them in mind as we continue Bethany's story. Once again, I am grateful for the ongoing support of Barnardo's, NSPCC, S.H.E.UK, and all the people who trusted me last time. We have another chance to raise an issue that affects so many lives, so often shrouded in shame." He also revealed that he was glad to be back on Coronation Street: "He is funny, deceitful, slippery, manipulative and ruthless. Now he is also under a lot of pressure too. This new storyline is absolutely full of twists." As the storyline progresses, Sarah tries to plant Lauren's hair bobble with strands of her hair evidence in Nathan's van to frame him for her disappearance, but is stopped by Kit Green (Jacob Roberts), who then plants it himself. As a result, Nathan is arrested for the murder and disappearance of Lauren and subsequently imprisoned. During police interviews, he was represented by Joel Deering (Calum Lill), who was later revealed to be Lauren's attacker, however she had initially told the police it was Nathan after Joel began threatening her.

Harper announced on 29 August 2024 that he would not be returning to Coronation Street. Harper explained Nathan's departure: "Coronation Street is not a place for the journey of a paedophile to recover and become loved," he said. "That's not a thing you should be doing on a soap. And so, I was absolutely adamant that if Nathan ever came back, then he mustn't be forgiven. But I did also know that it was about time he would be coming out [of prison], so I did wonder. But when I got the call from the producers, it smacked me sideways. I was shaken, because the story was so emotional at the time, and it made such a difference to my life, the people I met through it. So, coming back to Nathan was quite an emotional journey for me, to be honest." He continued: "I knew it mustn't be cathartic. We mustn't let him off the hook. He's done his time, and he thinks he should now be free to go and do what he wants. But he comes out, and he hasn't changed. He carries on doing exactly what he's always wanted to do. So he deserves to go back down, frankly! No, I'm definitely not going back, but never say never, I suppose! I genuinely do not want him to have a forgiveness arc. So, I don't know why he'd keep coming back to Weatherfield. It's Bethany's journey, not his. It's got to be about Bethany's life, and I think he's done his time. But if you could get Sally Wainwright to write something between Joel and Nathan, and it was past nine o'clock, I think it would be worth doing!" Harper also reflected on the roles he has after leaving Coronation Street and how Nathan's exit ties in: "I've been incredibly lucky. I'm just incredibly fortunate, because it's tough in the acting world at the moment. What's happened is Nathan's come out of prison [in Corrie] as Geoffrey's arrived to help Trixie in Call the Midwife at the same time, and the 30th anniversary of Art has come up. So, I'm immensely lucky."

== Jude Appleton ==
Jude Appleton
- Coronation Street character
- Portrayed by: Paddy Wallace
- Duration: 2016–2019
- First appearance: Episode 9065; 25 December 2016
- Last appearance: Episode 9657; 2 January 2019
- Introduced by: Kate Oates
In-universe information
- Other names: Dr. Ken Barlow
- Occupation: Store assistant
- Mother: Mary Taylor
- Wife: Angie Appleton (2016–2019)
- Sons: George Appleton
- Grandmothers: Maureen Taylor

Jude Appleton, played by Paddy Wallace, was introduced on 25 December 2016 as Mary Taylor's (Patti Clare) long-lost son. He is introduced as part of the exploration of Mary's backstory. He appears in a few episodes before leaving. Jude was reintroduced in 2017 with his wife, Angie Appleton (Victoria Ekanoye), and son, George Appleton (Romeo Cheetam-Karcz). On 30 October 2018, Wallace confirmed that he had filmed his final scenes, and Jude made his final appearance on 2 January 2019.

Jude arrives on Christmas Day 2016 to introduce himself to Mary as her son, explaining that he is a marine biologist living in South Africa. Mary avoids Jude's questions about his father and claims that he is a product of a teenage romance. Jude asks Mary to join him and his pregnant wife in South Africa; she agrees, but later changes her mind. Jude returns to South Africa and leaves on good terms with Mary. Eight months later, Jude returns with Angie and George for Mary's wedding to Norris Cole (Malcolm Hebden). He is upset when he discovers that he is a product of rape, but Mary reassures him that she loves him. Jude and his family decide to move to Weatherfield, despite Angie's hesitations; she is worried that Mary is trying to push her out of her family, as they argue frequently about Angie's drinking habits and George's health.

== Toby Chapman ==
Toby Chapman
- Coronation Street character
- Portrayed by: Andrew Dowbiggin
- Duration: 2016–2017
- First appearance: Episode 9066; 26 December 2016
- Last appearance: Episode 9130; 17 March 2017
- Introduced by: Kate Oates
In-universe information
- Wife: Toyah Battersby (until 2017)
- Sons: Josh Chapman

Toby Chapman, played by Andrew Dowbiggin, is the ex-husband of Toyah Battersby (Georgia Taylor) whom she married in 2011, after she broke up with Spider Nugent (Martin Hancock). They went through five cycles of IVF treatment, but were still unable to conceive. When Toyah returns to Weatherfield to stay with her stepsister Leanne Battersby (Jane Danson) on Christmas Day 2016, he visits her and confronts her about their marriage's breakdown, unaware that she has been having an affair with Peter Barlow (Chris Gascoyne).

Toby returns a month later to tell Toyah that they needed to pay for the fertility clinic to keep their embryos frozen for longer, which Toyah didn't feel able to sign as she felt their marriage was over. Toby left when he ordered a taxi to Manchester Piccadilly station and was coincidentally driven by Peter. He warns Peter about Toyah's baby obsession and would bleed him dry the same way she did to him when he paid £30,000 on the fertility clinic.

== Mel Maguire ==
Mel Maguire
- Coronation Street character
- Portrayed by: Sonia Ibrahim
- Duration: 2016–2017
- First appearance: Episode 9066; 26 December 2016
- Last appearance: Episode 9264; 2 October 2017
- Introduced by: Kate Oates
In-universe information
- Occupation: shop assistant

Mel Maguire, played by Sonia Ibrahim, was an assistant at Supreme Tanning. She is the right-hand woman and personal assistant of Nathan Curtis (Christopher Harper), whom she frequently helps in his scheme to groom Bethany Platt (Lucy Fallon) into becoming his girlfriend with her tutorials. Mel later kidnaps Bethany at Nathan's request to have her silenced so she will not testify against him at his trial for rape. However, Mel betrays Nathan by letting Bethany go to court after the two learn that Lara Cutler (Niamh Blackshaw) – a 14-year-old girl who was one of Nathan's younger victims – committed suicide due to Nathan's abuse. Her betrayal results in Nathan and his accomplices being found guilty and jailed for grooming Bethany.

Ibraham expressed her pride in being cast in Coronation Street: "I was literally over the moon and I cried my eyes out when my agent told me [I was joining]! It's such an amazing place to work and it's been an honour to be here. I was really excited to meet everybody, because I'm a fan of Coronation Street and I watch the show anyway."

== Other characters ==
Character	Date(s)	Actor	Circumstances
Lee	15 January	Aaron Cobham	Lee is one of Jamie Bowman's (James Anderton) old schoolfriends and Steph Britton's (Tisha Merry) ex-boyfriend. He is arrested on a charge of posting private and sexual images online of her. Luke is surprised to discover that Jamie is out on bail and working at the upmarket bar in Manchester.
Bridget Finch	29 January	Carol Harvey	After Bridget learns that her husband Brendan Finch (Ted Robbins) has been having an affair with Mary Taylor (Patti Clare), she goes to the Rovers Return Inn to confront Mary. Bridget informs her that it is not the first time Brendan has had an affair and then slaps her. Brendan denies all knowledge of the affair, saying Mary is just a fan. He leaves with Bridget.
Tom Finlay	5–12 February	Daniel Casey	While drinking in The Bistro, Tom notices and flirts with Leanne before giving her his phone number.
Shelley	4 March – 4 July	Natalie Davies	Lauren and Shelley bully Bethany at school. She and Lauren send cruel messages to Bethany online.
Saskia Larson	28 March – 6 June	Leandra Ashton	Saskia Larson is Will's fiancée. She hires Michelle to plan her wedding, unaware that she dated Will when they were in their early teens. Saskia goes away on business, and Will and Michelle start an affair. When Steve McDonald (Simon Gregson) returns from Spain, Saskia enters the Rovers Return Inn with Will and tells Steve that Michelle and Will had been having an affair. Steve orders them to leave.
Lorane	9 March – 7 September	Lisa Moore	When Sarah discovers that Bethany has been bullied, she visits Lauren's home to confront her. Sarah warns Lauren's mother to keep Lauren away from Bethany. She and Lauren later appear at the Platt household, demanding justice when Nick throws Lauren's schoolbag into the road. She supports Lauren at a school meeting between her and Bethany, but after getting into a vicious argument with Sarah insulting both of them, both Bethany and Lauren are suspended from Weatherfield High.
Sam Trenton	4 April–17 May	Joseph Taylor	The boyfriend of Amy Barlow (Elle Mulvaney) whom she meets while attending music classes at the community centre, where he plays the clarinet in the same group as her.
Phil	30 September – 3 October	James Doherty	Phil is Lauren's father. Shortly after Lauren's expulsion, he arrives at Weatherfield High and demands that Mr. Griffin (Roger Moorlidge) expel Bethany Platt (Lucy Fallon) and claims that Lauren is the victim of bullying despite reports to the contrary. Mr. Griffin threatens to call the police if Phil and Lauren do not leave the premises. Enraged, Phil complies. Several days later, Phil follows David to The Dog & Gun pub and violently assaults him in the car park as revenge for his cutting Lauren's hair and threatening to slit her throat.
