= Episode 11,145 =

2023 episode of Coronation Street

- Coronation Street episodes
- Episode nos.: Episodes 11,145
- Directed by: Gill Wilkinson
- Written by: Damon Alexis-Rochefort
- Original air date: 25 December 2023
- Running time: 30 minutes (including advertisement breaks)

Guest appearance
- Ram John Holder as Sarge Bailey

Episode chronology
← Previous; Episode 11,144	Next → Episode 11,146

Episode 11,145 of the British soap opera Coronation Street was originally broadcast on 25 December 2023 on ITV1. This was the first time since 1997 that the Coronation Street Christmas Day episode had been 30 minutes long rather than an hour. Many fans and critics were unhappy with this change. One of the episode's plots revolved around the exit storyline of long-running character Peter Barlow (Chris Gascoyne). It had been previously reported that Peter would receive a mystery gift from his wife, Carla Connor (Alison King), which would leave him shocked. Another storyline centred on the continuation of Paul Foreman (Peter Ash)'s motor neurone disease storyline. Producer Iain MacLeod wanted to showcase the progression of the character's disease and also feature Paul in storylines not involving his condition.

Other plots focused on various Coronation Street residents and families celebrating Christmas Day. The episode also featured the return of Matt Milburn as Tommy Orpington, which sparked the beginning of his romance storyline with Tracy Barlow (Kate Ford). Critics reported on the reception; some fans disliked the content of the episode, whilst others found various aspects of the episode emotional. Fans had also speculated over what Carla's gift to Peter would be, with some believing that it would be divorce papers. The episode received lower ratings than the 2022 Coronation Street Christmas episode and failed to make the top 10 list.

== Plot ==
The episode begins with the residents of Weatherfield celebrating Christmas morning. Evelyn Plummer (Maureen Lipman) becomes annoyed when she quickly pops into the shop she works in and several residents try to buy stuff despite the shop being closed. Gemma Winter (Dolly-Rose Campbell) visits her brother Paul Foreman (Peter Ash) and his husband Billy Mayhew (Daniel Brocklebank). Paul pretends to feel unwell in order to spend time alone with Billy. Peter Barlow (Chris Gascoyne) gifts his wife Carla Connor (Alison King) an inscribed bracelet. Ed Bailey (Trevor Michael Georges) feels guilty seeing his family spend Christmas with few presents due to their presents having been robbed due to Ed's gambling addiction. The guilt intensifies as he receives a watch calling him the "World's Best Dad". Tracy Barlow (Kate Ford) is cooking for her family and is unhappy when Daniel Osbourne (Rob Mallard), Adam Barlow (Sam Robertson) and Bertie Osbourne (Rufus Morgan-Smith) cancel their plans and join them. Gemma becomes worried about Paul being on his own and when he does not answer his phone and the front door, Chesney Brown (Sam Aston) and Todd Grimshaw (Gareth Pierce) go into the flat, where they interrupt Paul and Billy having sex. Meanwhile, the Platt and Webster families have their Christmas dinners at the local bistro, where they complain about the set menu to each other and to workers Leanne Battersby (Jane Danson), Toyah Battersby (Georgia Taylor) and Nick Tilsley (Ben Price).

Evelyn spends her Christmas with Mary Taylor (Patti Clare) and Roy Cropper (David Neilson) at Roy's café. The Barlows end up arguing, and most of the family leave to look for alcohol. Friction occurs between Tracy and her husband, Steve McDonald (Simon Gregson), following a joke about taking a relationship gap year. The Bailey and the Nazir families eat food at Speed Daal. Roy and Evelyn exchange gifts. Whilst collecting alcohol from her flower shop, Tracy bumps into footballer Tommy Orpington (Matt Milburn), to whom she sells flowers. Tommy tells Tracy to call him if she needs any decorating done. Chesney, Gemma, Paul and their families, along with Dev Alahan (Jimmi Harkishin), video call Bernie Winter (Jane Hazlegrove), who is in prison. They sing "Away in a Manger" together. Carla gifts Peter a one-way ticket to Bilbao so that he can join the boat crew of his friend Mickey. She tells her husband that she will not be joining him, which shocks him.

== Production ==
Episode 11,145 originally aired at 7 pm GMT on ITV1 on 25 December 2023. Prior to the broadcast, it had been announced that the episode would be 30 minutes long, rather than 60 minutes as with previous Christmas Day Coronation Street episodes. This was the first time since 1997 that the Christmas Day episode for the soap had been only 30 minutes long. Fellow ITV soap opera Emmerdale also had its Christmas Day episode halved to 30 minutes. This was reported by critics as being a "shake-up" to the normal Christmas Day schedule. Ahead of the episode's release, spoilers were reported for the episode and other storylines during the month. It was reported that one character would be departing the soap during the Coronation Street festive episodes. Spoilers also teased that Ed Bailey (Trevor Michael Georges) would be harbouring a "huge secret" from the rest of his family. Daniel Kilkelly from Digital Spy reported, "Christmas Day is a family affair for the residents of Coronation Street as Weatherfield's finest gather together at their respective houses to reflect over the last 12 months and look forward to what the future holds."

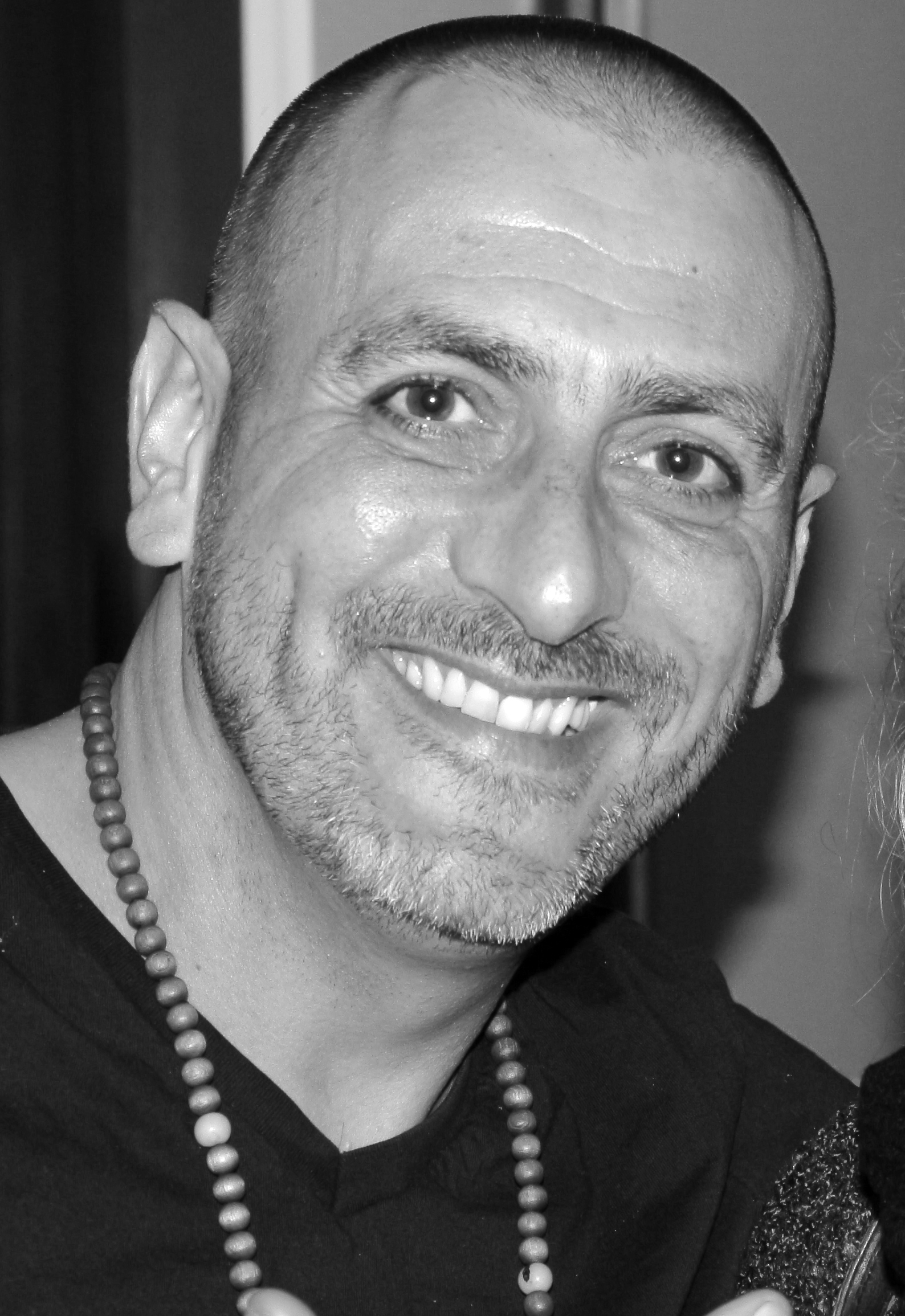
Chris Gascoyne portrays Peter, who departs in the following episode

The main plot revolved around the lead-up to the departure of long-running character Peter Barlow, played by Chris Gascoyne. The events of the Christmas and Boxing Day episodes were reported to be "life-changing" for Peter and his wife, Carla Connor (Alison King). Gascoyne had announced earlier in 2023 that he would be departing Coronation Street as Peter. It had been reported that Carla would give Peter a "mysterious gift" which would leave Peter "shocked". Carla had recently seen Peter discuss about how unhappy he is with his life in a support group meeting for alcoholics. Prior to the episode, Peter had been struggling with his mental health since running over serial killer Stephen Reid (Todd Boyce).

The episode ends with Carla trying to convince Peter to leave Weatherfield. King explained Carla's intentions of giving Peter a single one-way ticket, revealing that whilst Peter would love to live on a boat, it would not suit Carla. The actress explained that whilst Peter could live on a boat for a year like he had done previously, Carla "has to look at the bigger picture – it would mean potentially throwing everything away for her to go and do that. If she went and came back, what would be left for her here?" King added that, whilst Peter has family in Weatherfield, Carla would have nothing left if she left and returned. King added, "If you love someone, you should let them go. That's really for both of them." The episode ends with Carla embracing her husband's face. The gesture leads to Peter's departure in the following episode, which was broadcast on 26 December of that year. Speaking about the filming of the Christmas and Boxing Day episodes, King revealed that she and Gascoyne filmed "solidly" for two days, explaining that there was "a lot to learn"; she called the filming amazing but "emotional", adding that she did not require anything to create fake tears for the scenes. King added, "There was no way of knowing what would happen because every time we did it I literally filled up with emotion and started crying at different times in every scene. Just seeing a different look from Chris would set me off because he's so wonderful at Meisner technique, which involves an actor reacting to another actor's performance and behaviour, he's so reactive." King reiterated that she loved working with Gascoyne, calling him "brilliant". Gascoyne was "delighted" with his departure storyline, calling the scripts "superb" and admitting that he was looking forward to seeing the "reaction" to how Peter departs the soap. The actor also felt "moved" when reading his last script.

"Tommy has often been slightly 'over there' as an untouchable figure on a pedestal for our characters to hero worship. This will be the first time we've done anything more significant with him and Matt is absolutely over the moon to be doing something a bit more. He's thrilled with the storyline and thinks it's a lot of fun."

— Iain MacLeod on the return of Tommy (2023)

The episode also featured the return of Matt Milburn as footballer Tommy Orpington, who had previously appeared on the soap for various stints between 2016 and 2021. Coronation Street producer Iain MacLeod had announced the character's return in October 2023, saying, "You'll see Tommy again on Christmas Day!" MacLeod also revealed that Tommy's wife had left him and that he had now returned to his previous profession – painting and decorating – which Tommy enjoys due to no one telling him what to do. MacLeod also teased that a storyline would evolve where Tommy – who the producer described as an "attractive, historically successful man" – arrives into an established female character's life, upsetting the "apple cart in fairly spectacular fashion". MacLeod did not specify who the female character was as he wanted viewers to be surprised when Tommy returns in the episode, but explained that the storyline would really trigger a "new direction" for certain characters. The female character was revealed to be Tracy Barlow (Kate Ford), with the pair having a "spark" on Christmas Day, which would lead to a "secret romance" in later episodes. A writer from Inside Soap commented that Tracy would receive a "sexy surprise" in the form of Tommy when he comes looking for flowers for his mother, with Tracy "only too happy to oblige him".

Emotional scenes were also promised for Paul Foreman (Peter Ash), who was reported to be having his final Christmas due to his worsening motor neurone disease, which had been a long-running storyline that began earlier in 2023. MacLeod revealed that he and other producers were keen to show Paul's "inevitable medical progression" in as much detail as possible to highlight the "day to day progression of illnesses" which they could realistically portray in a soap opera. However, MacLeod added that it was important to have a "story" in addition to that and thus they were trying to keep Paul's family occupied so that the medical storyline would run continuously, explaining that people who are ill also have to "contend with catastrophes that are nothing to do with the illness at all". Paul's Christmas "catastrophe" involved his mother, Bernie Winter (Jane Hazlegrove), being unable to be present for Paul's last Christmas due to being in prison. MacLeod added, "There's a lot of really poignant stuff as well, so what we've tried to do is make it bittersweet and as realistic as far as we could and a fitting, funny but poignant last Christmas for Paul with that fantastic family at the centre of it all."

== Reception ==
Prior to the episode's broadcast, viewers voiced their complaints and confusion on social media over the episode being only 30 minutes long. The Daily Mirror reported how fans were angry over the decision to cut the running time of the Coronation Street and Emmerdale episodes, with a writer from the website saying that the change made the episodes look "lean" and opined that "many" viewers would feel "short changed" by it. They added, "Needless to say, soap fans are already up in arms" regarding the change. Stephen Patterson from Metro wrote that the Christmas episodes would have some "sadness" and believed that fans would not be "likely to forget" them.

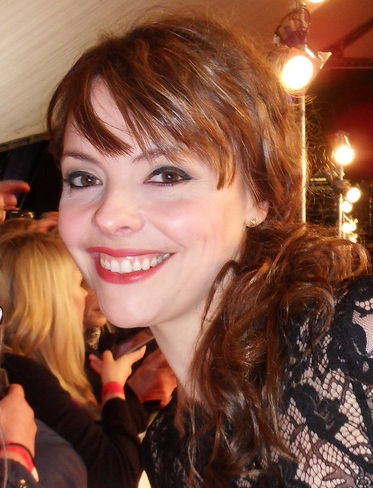
Fans speculated that Tommy would begin a romance with Tracy, played by Kate Ford (pictured).

About 2.6 million people watched the episode when it aired at 7 pm on ITV1, down from 2.8 million the previous year and nearly eight million in 2013. The episode did not make the top 10 most watched TV programmes of Christmas Day 2023, which was the first time in decades that Coronation Street had not appeared in that list. Emmerdale also did not make the list, but rival BBC soap opera EastEnders – which was broadcast for an hour at a later time slot – did. Lizo Mzimba and Sean Seddon wrote that Christmas 2023 proved to be a "mixed day" for soap operas.

Following its broadcast, James Rodger from Birmingham Live reported how fans were "angry" over the episode, with many fans being disappointed by the episode being only 30 minutes long, whilst others criticised the content of the episode. Daniel Kilkelly from Digital Spy opined that Tracy and Steve's bickering made the Christmas meal distracting for the other characters. A writer from Inside Soap opined that Christmas Day is "far from a peaceful affair" at the Barlow household. Olivia Wheeler from the Daily Mirror reported how fans were "delighted" to see the return of Bernie in the episode, which Wheeler called "emotional". Simon Coyle from Manchester Evening News noted how fans expressed on social media that it felt "weird" seeing Tommy return, with some speculating that Tommy and Tracy would end up having a romance.

Coyle's colleagues Wheeler and Kieran Isgin from Manchester Evening News reported how fans were left "sobbing" after the "emotional twist" over Carla gifting Peter the ticket, with fans reporting on social media how the scenes had made them cry. Charlotte Tutton from the Daily Mirror reported on how fans had speculated that Carla would be gifting Peter a ticket following a clue in earlier episodes, where Carla was seen printing something and talking about it to Sarah Platt (Tina O'Brien). Tutton called the gift "awkward" and wrote that fans were "gutted" over their prediction. Other fans had speculated that Carla would give Peter divorce papers. Tutton also believed that time away was "much needed" for Peter due to his mental health issues. Kilkelly believed that whilst the episode started positively when Peter gave Carla her present, it ended on a "cliffhanger" that would set up Peter's exit from the soap.
