= Christopher Harper (actor) =

British actor

- Born: 19 August 1977 (age 49); London, England
- Occupation: Actor
- Known for: Nathan Curtis in Coronation Street
- Spouse: Emily Bowker (m. 2013)

Christopher William Harper (born 19 August 1977) is an English actor and director who played Nathan Curtis in ITV soap Coronation Street in a high profile teenage grooming and exploitation storyline.

== Television drama performances ==
Harper has appeared in British dramas including The Suspicions of Mr Whicher, Upstairs Downstairs, Rosemary &Thyme, Life on Mars and most notably as playing Clifford Last, son of Victoria Wood's character Nella Last in ITV television film Housewife, 49. He also starred as Trixie Franklin's brother Geoffrey in the series 12 finale of Call The Midwife.

== Stage performances ==
As a stage actor he has played Benedick in Much Ado About Nothing for Shakespeare's Globe Theatre, a season of Sir Alan Aykbourn plays at The Royal & Derngate Theatre, Northampton (directed by Ayckbourn himself) and many other plays at the Crucible Theatre, Hampstead Theatre and The Old Vic, London.

== Charity work ==
Harper has helped raise awareness of child sex abuse through charity work and as patron for the charity Voicing CSA, which helps adult survivors of child sexual abuse to speak out.

== Personal life ==
He married actress Emily Bowker in 2013. They live in London.
