= Julia Goulding =

English actress (born 1985)

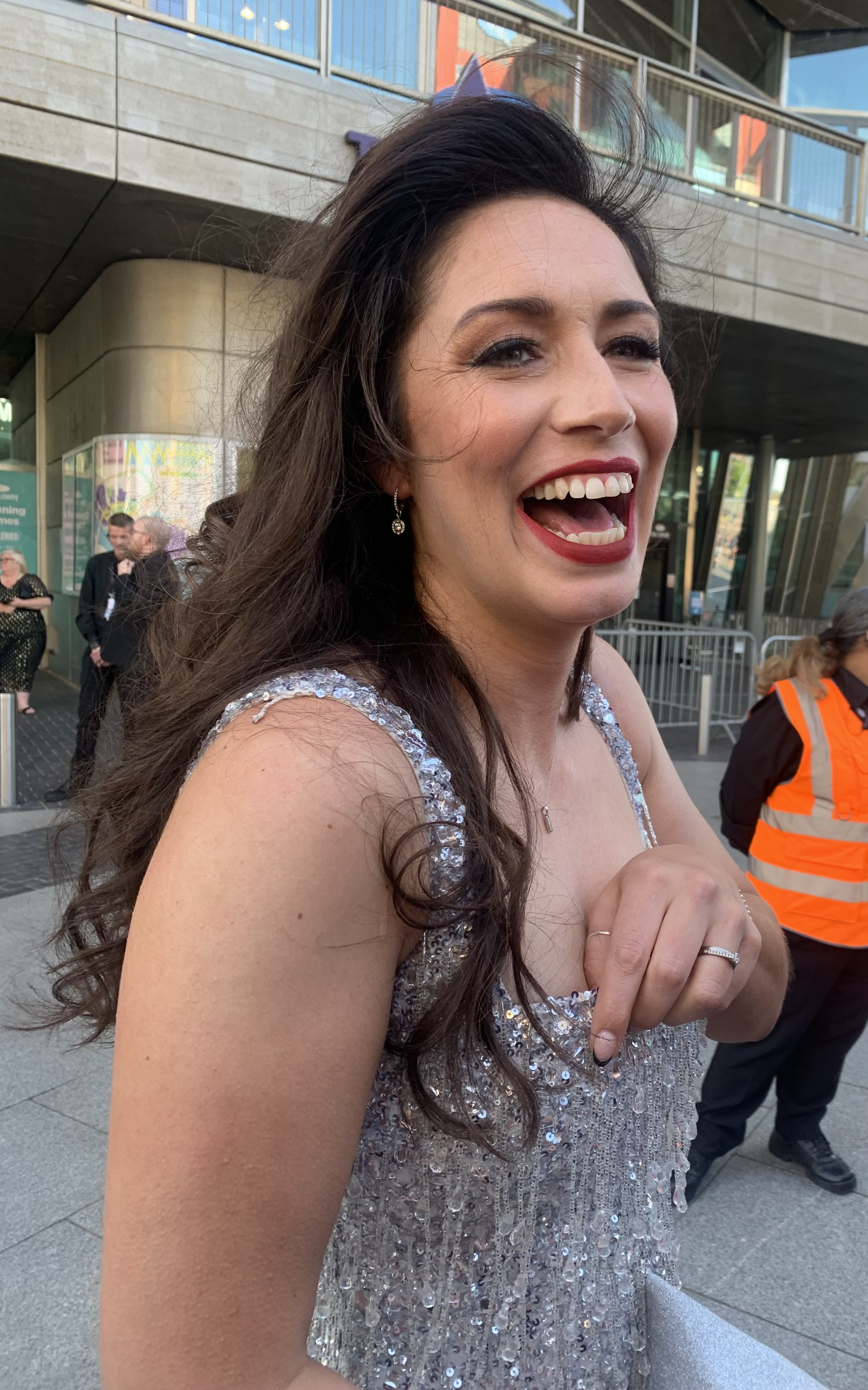
- Goulding in 2023
- Born: 27 March 1985 (age 41); Manchester, England
- Occupation: Actress
- Years active: 2011–present
- Known for: Coronation Street (2016–)
- Spouse: Ben Silver (m. 2018)
- Children: 2

Julia Goulding (born 27 March 1985) is an English actress who has played Shona Platt on the ITV soap opera Coronation Street, since 2016.

== Career ==
Goulding attended the Royal Academy of Dramatic Art. She has starred in theatre productions including The Crucible, The Canterbury Tales, Othello, Merchant of Venice and The Notorious Mrs. Ebbsmith.

Goulding's first television role was on the long-running ITV soap opera Coronation Street, beginning in December 2016 as Shona Ramsey, the new love interest of David Platt (Jack P. Shepherd).

== Personal life ==
She is married to Ben Silver. The pair married at Manchester Albert Hall in December 2018 after dating for three years. Goulding revealed that she was expecting her first child with Silver via an Instagram post on 30 May 2019. She gave birth to a boy on 30 November 2019. On 11 June 2022, she announced her second pregnancy. In November 2022, she gave birth to a girl.
