= Bhavna Limbachia =

British actress (born 1984)

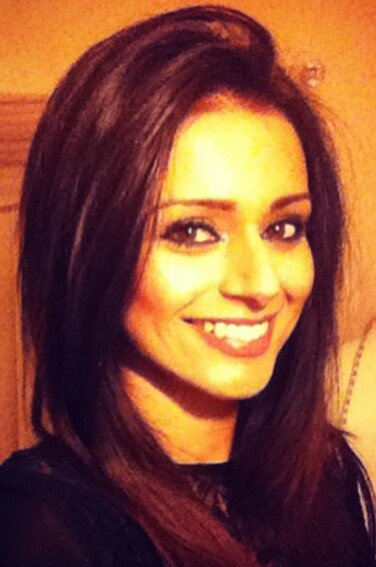
- Limbachia in 2015
- Born: Bhavna Jayanty Limbachia; 21 April 1984 (age 41); Preston, Lancashire, England
- Occupation: Actress
- Years active: 2012–present
- Notable work: Citizen Khan (2012–2016); Coronation Street (2016–2019)
- Spouse: Darren Kuppan (m. 2018)

Bhavna Jayanty Limbachia (born 21 April 1984) is an English actress. She is known for her roles in the BBC comedy Citizen Khan (2012–2016), the ITV soap opera Coronation Street (2016–2019), the ITV series Ridley (2022–2024), and the Sky Max series Brassic (2022–2025).

== Early life and education ==
Limbachia was born in Preston, Lancashire in 1984 to an Indian-born mother and a Kenyan-born father, both of Indian origins. She is a Hindu.

Limbachia studied photography, fashion and textiles at college, then moved onto a degree course in Costume Design at Bretton Hall, an affiliate college of the University of Leeds.

Before going into acting, Limbachia worked in costume departments on several film sets including Chicken Tikka Masala in 2005, Bradford Riots in 2006 as a costume trainee, and All Day Breakfast in 2008. In 2010, she set up her own business designing and selling vintage clothing and accessories.

Limbachia worked for Trading Standards and saved up money to do an acting course at the Manchester School of Acting.

== Career ==
Through drama school, Limbachia landed her first role in theatre in the play Rafta Rafta, written by Ayub Khan Din who also wrote East Is East.

Limbachia made her television debut in 2012 playing the character Alia Khan in the BBC comedy series Citizen Khan. The character wears a hijab, tight jeans and tops, and a lot of make-up.

In February 2016, Limbachia joined the long-running ITV soap opera, Coronation Street, playing Rana Habeeb as a love interest for character Zeedan Nazir. In January 2019, Limbachia announced her departure from the show, with Rana being killed off later in the year. She departed in the episode broadcast on 20 March 2019.

Rana was the show's first muslim lesbian character and her partnership with Faye Brookes, who plays her lover Kate Connor has been highlighted amongst fans and the community. The storyline in which Rana discovers her sexuality and her parents’ subsequent disappointment was praised and the two characters gained the supercouple name ‘Kana’. The Rana and Kate storyline was named as one of the Top 10 LGBT+ Media Moments in the British LGBT Awards 2019.

== Personal life ==
Limbachia married actor Darren Kuppan in July 2018 at Thornton Manor in a British and Indian ceremony.

== Filmography ==
Year	Title	Role	Notes
2012–2016	Citizen Khan	Alia Khan	Regular role, 34 episodes
2013	Doctors	Anita Achari	
2014	Casualty	Suraya Afzal	
2014	Pramface	Nicola	
2014	Mount Pleasant	Hostess	
2015	Cuffs	PC Misha Baig	
2015	Horrible Histories	Various	
2015	Tez Ilyas's Christmas	Sofia	Christmas special
2016–2019	Coronation Street	Rana Habeeb	Regular role
2021	Inside No. 9	Jo	Episode: "Hurry Up and Wait"
2022–2024	Ridley	Geri Farman	10 episodes
2022–2025	Brassic	Meena	
2025	Death in Paradise	Chaz Simons	Episode 14.2

== Awards and nominations ==
Year	Award	Category	Result	Ref.
2016	TV Choice Awards	Best Soap Newcomer	Nominated	
2016	Digital Spy Reader Awards	Best Newcomer	Fourth	
2017	Digital Spy Reader Awards	Best Soap Relationship (shared with Faye Brookes)	Second	
2018	The British Soap Awards	Best Actress	Nominated	
2018	The British Soap Awards	Best On-Screen Partnership (shared with Brookes)	Nominated	
2018	TV Choice Awards	Best Soap Actress	Nominated	
2018	Inside Soap Awards	Best Partnership (shared with Brookes)	Nominated	
2018	I Talk Telly Awards	Best Soap Partnership (shared with Brookes)	Nominated	
2019	The British Soap Awards	Best Actress	Nominated	
2019	Inside Soap Awards	Best Exit	Shortlisted	
