= Emily Bowker =

British actress

Emily Bowker is a British actress who has appeared on television in programmes such as Neighbours, High School Musical The TV Show Starring Emily Bowker Upstairs Downstairs, Shameless, Torchwood, Holby City, Wire in the Blood, and The Bill. Her theatrical career to date includes plays at The Birmingham Rep, West Yorkshire Playhouse, The Salisbury Playhouse, The Arcola Theatre, Finborough Theatre, Bristol Old Vic, Cheltenham Everyman and Theatre Clwyd. She has also performed in various plays for BBC Radio 4 and appeared in the independent British feature film City Rats. In Torchwood, she appeared as Ellie Johnson in a 2006 episode called "Countrycide".
