= Pat Phelan (Coronation Street) =

Fictional character in British soap opera

- Coronation Street character
- Portrayed by: Connor McIntyre
- Duration: 2013–2014, 2016–2018
- First appearance: Episode 8226; 2 October 2013
- Last appearance: Episode 9471; 1 June 2018
- Introduced by: Stuart Blackburn
In-universe information
- Other names: Alan Frost
- Occupation: Property Developer; Builder; Criminal; Businessman
- Wife: Valerie Phelan (until 2015); Eileen Grimshaw (2017–2018)
- Daughters: Nicola Rubinstein
- Stepsons: Jason Grimshaw; Todd Grimshaw
- Grandsons: Zack Rubinstein

Pat Phelan is a fictional character from the British ITV soap opera Coronation Street, portrayed by Connor McIntyre. He made his first appearance during the episode broadcast on 2 October 2013. The character was introduced as an acquaintance of builder Owen Armstrong (Ian Puleston-Davies), who later goes into business partnership with Phelan that soon turns out to be part of the latter's revenge plot against both Owen and his protégé Gary Windass (Mikey North) over a £4,000 debt they forced him to repay. The storyline led to Gary's mother Anna Windass (Debbie Rush), also Owen's romantic partner, getting raped by Phelan after he coerced her into sleeping with him in exchange for ending his blackmail threat against her family. He then departed on 14 April 2014.

The character was reintroduced on 19 January 2016. His reign of terror continued as Phelan clashed with archenemies Anna and Gary once more, during which he establishes a romantic relationship with their next-door neighbour Eileen Grimshaw (Sue Cleaver) and later ends up marrying her. He also commits a number of crimes, which include conning several residents out of their money in a fraudulent property scheme; causing the death of Eileen's boyfriend Michael Rodwell (Les Dennis); blackmailing and then murdering Michael's surrogate son Andy Carver (Oliver Farnworth) after holding him captive in a basement for several months; kidnapping his former partner-in-crime Vinny Ashford (Ian Kelsey) and having him killed by Andy on the same night of the latter's murder; killing Andy's best-friend Luke Britton (Dean Fagan); and getting Anna wrongfully jailed after successfully framing her for injuring their mutual acquaintance Seb Franklin (Harry Visinoni) in a ladder accident. Phelan's long-lost daughter Nicola Rubinstein (Nicola Thorp) was introduced in 2017, a development that continues exploration of the character's background; their father-daughter bond ended when Nicola discovered her father's true nature, including the alleged discovery that Phelan had previously raped her late mother Annabel and beat up the latter's husband Issac in the past.

Eventually Phelan's crimes are exposed in March 2018 and during a confrontation with Eileen, he falls into the sea and is presumed dead. Phelan returns as part of a series of special post-watershed episodes, which concluded when he was killed-off by Anna in the end. During the character's second stint, he was named one of the best soap villains of all time and in the programme itself; alongside the likes of fellow Corrie antagonists Alan Bradley (Mark Eden) and Richard Hillman (Brian Capron) respectively.

== Development ==
=== Departure ===
On 31 January 2018, it was confirmed that Phelan would be leaving the show in an "explosive stunt".

== Storylines ==
=== Backstory ===
Pat Phelan started residing in Weatherfield, a fictional district in Greater Manchester, years before his first arrival; he was born on 30th October 1963 and grew up becoming a builder and businessman.

=== 2013–2014 ===
In October 2013, Phelan was introduced as a business client of Weatherfield proprietor Owen Armstrong (Ian Puleston-Davies) when the latter visited his house to confront Phelan over his £4,000 debt; Owen had previously done a job for Phelan, who then refused to pay for it. Phelan explained that he was bankrupt and that all of his financial assets are bequeathed to his wife Valerie (Caroline Berry), who had earlier refused to pay Owen when he visited her salon shop to confront Valerie over her husband's debt. In response, Owen summons his protege Gary Windass (Mikey North) and the pair break into Phelan's house; they steal his motorbike and lock it away at Owen's building yard to force Phelan into repaying the debt he owes. Phelan later confronts Owen at his yard and initially threatens to call the police, but is forced to relent when Owen makes it clear that he knows all about Phelan's "shady" past and also threatens to tell Valerie about his recent infidelity. Left with no other choice, Phelan pays Owen the £4,000 he owes him and is given back his motorbike; Phelan then deaprts but not before after being introduced to Owen's girlfriend and Gary's mother: Anna Windass (Debbie Rush)

Two months later before Christmas 2013, Phelan visits Owen at his house with a business proposition; to put forward a flat-conversion contract, with Owen acting as the project's front since Phelan is bankrupt. Despite family reservations, Owen becomes interested in the offer and meets up with Phelan in early 2014 to discuss their potential partnership. Phelan tells Owen that he needs £80,000 stumping up for the costs, but guarantees that he would make over £200,000 profit and gives him 24 hours to discuss the deal with his family. While Anna opposes the idea due to her belief that Phelan is a conman, Owen's youngest daughter Katy (Georgia May Foote) convinces her father to go ahead with the partnership; Owen thus goes into business with Phelan.

With the business appearing to run smoothly, Anna decides to visit Phelan and apologize for her reservations against him. Phelan accepts her apology but then surprises her by making a sexual compliment on her appearance. For the next few weeks Anna finds herself unsettled with Phelan's presence, especially when he delivers a card to her and she finds out it is about his inappropriate affection towards her. She eventually invites Phelan to her house and demands that he back off, but he ignores her warning and instead accuses her of trying to come onto him. He then makes a move on Anna, who responds by throwing him out of her house. She later feigns illness to avoid another meeting with Phelan and Valerie at the Bistro, only for her desperation to be perceived by Owen's older daughter Izzy (Cherylee Houston) that night. When Anna is unable to stop Izzy from prying her suspicions, she reluctantly confides that Phelan attempted to rape her. Izzy comforts Anna and agrees to not tell Gary, especially as he is also Izzy's boyfriend at the time.

However, when Gary begins to take notice of the secret, Izzy is forced to tell him about the incident. Later on that evening, Gary confronts Phelan at the worksite once Owen and the other builders have left the area. Gary demands that Phelan stay away from his mother, but Phelan rebuffs this and begins insulting Anna by calling her names. This causes Gary to snap and punch Phelan, which leads to the two having a physical fight; Phelan easily gets the upper hand until Gary ends up striking him over the head with a plank of wood, knocking Phelan unconscious as a result. Gary, believing he has killed Phelan, calls Owen to tell him what has happened; Owen and Gary later go to the worksite to deal with Phelan's body, only to end up discovering that Phelan has vanished.

A few days later in March 2014, Phelan reappears in Weatherfield and summons Gary and Owen without the rest of their family's knowledge — implicitly telling the duo how he plans to get revenge on them over the incident. When they attempt to end their partnership with Phelan the following morning, he takes Gary and Owen into the site office and shows them the CCTV footage of Gary attacking him. Phelan assures Gary and Owen that he has further copies and then demands that either they complete the work for a minimum wage — gleaning no profit — or he would hand the CCTV footage into the police. Despite Gary's reluctance, Owen complies with Phelan's orders as he does not want his grandson Jake to grow up without a father figure if Gary were to be sent to prison. Phelan relishes in blackmailing Owen and Gary, such as ordering the former to wash his car and getting the latter to dig a grave for a dead pigeon. This effectively strains Owen and Gary's relationship, as they begin to take their frustrations out on each other as well as their family. Phelan continues to overwork the pair by forcing them to remove perfectly fitted windows from the building his crewmen are working on, an act which nearly causes Gary to lash out at Phelan again until Owen quickly separates them. Gary soon plans to get even on Phelan by stealing a shipment of tiles from him, but Phelan quickly finds out that it was Gary and was ready to report him to the police until Owen manages to stop him — pointing out that Gary's wages are already being docked because of the situation he caused in the first place. Phelan agrees not to report Gary to the police, but instead decides to keep the £80,000 that Owen invested onto their business project — which turns out to be what Phelan had intended to do all along to exact revenge on Owen for stealing his motorbike and being forced to pay what was owed. When Phelan takes Valerie on a holiday the next day, Gary breaks into their house in an attempt to extract the CCTV footage; however, Owen quickly stops him in his tracks — reminding Gary that Phelan has multiple copies. The two start planning on seeking other job opportunities in order to prevent Phelan from blackmailing them any further; however, this fails when Phelan discovers their intentions after learning of the break-in at his house and quickly deducing that Gary was behind it. In retaliation, Phelan arranges for Owen to be removed from the council's list of approved builders — effectively blacklisting him, which meant Owen could no longer get any independent work.

In April 2014, Phelan demotes Owen from his position as the project's site manager — replacing him with a disrespectful foreman: Clive (Gary Whitaker), who constantly antagonizes Owen throughout his shift. Towards the end of the evening, Phelan orders Owen to clean up the worksite alone before leaving the area with Clive — who unknowingly forgets to collect his lighter; Owen later finds the lighter and plans on setting fire to the worksite, destroying Phelan's empire in the process. Just as he prepares to do so, however, Anna confronts him for running late in attending Faye's school play and soon learns of the situation that Phelan has inflicted upon their family. After failing to convince Valerie to get her husband to back down, even when telling her about the actions Phelan has caused, Anna personally visits Phelan and pleads with him to go easy on Gary and Owen; with Anna further stating that Gary had once been in the army and had the traumatic experience of losing his comrades. At first, Phelan appears to ignore Anna's pleas when he insists that she joins him for lunch, but thereupon gives her an indecent proposition: to have sex with him and he would let Gary and Owen go from the project. A disgusted Anna initially refuses to accept Phelan's "transaction", but decides to give in when she later finds Gary having a mental breakdown over the escalating situation. The next day, Anna meets up with Phelan at the Dunford Hall Hotel — where the two have sex as Phelan had planned. Afterwards, Phelan teases Anna as she furiously leaves with a contract that he planted to represent his bargain of their deal. He soon pays the whole family a visit at their house and fulfills his agreement with Anna by telling Gary and Owen that they're out of the project — fabricating a story on how Anna spoke to Valerie about the situation and managed to coax her into persuading him to put their differences aside. After getting Owen to sign a contract that releases him and Gary from their duties, Phelan hands over the disc containing CCTV evidence of his assault before leaving the house — though not before he declares victory against the family, sarcastically telling them "It's been a pleasure". Phelan subsequently departed Weatherfield with Owen's £80,000 investment off-screen.

In June 2014, Phelan sends Anna and Owen a postcard from Dubai — further rubbing in his triumphant glory against them. At that point, the couple and their families have been reduced to financial difficulties and are forced to move out of their home; with Owen also being declared an official bankrupt since he is unable to repay all his debts. Though they manage to partly bounce back from their troubles by moving into a new home, Anna eventually admits to Owen that she slept with Phelan to make him leave their family alone. The revelation slowly drove the couple apart from 2015 onwards. By then, however, Valerie had too split up with Phelan upon learning of his true colours — rendering him penniless due to his assets being completely entitled to his estranged wife.

=== 2016–2018 ===
Pat Phelan returns to Weatherfield in January 2016, having got a job from local builder Jason Grimshaw (Ryan Thomas) at his construction business and later working with his friend Kevin Webster (Michael Le Vell) on his garage expansion at Webster's Auto Centre. Anna eventually learns of Phelan's return when she witnesses Kevin saving him from a speeding car — driven by Jamie Bowman (James Atherton), a pornographic offender, and his accomplice Lee (Aaron Cobham) — and he later tells Kevin his own version of what happened between them; with Phelan learning that Owen had already left in 2015 and that Anna is having a relationship with Kevin. Later on, Phelan visits Anna to "apologize" for destroying her relationship with Owen and promises that he won't cause her any trouble — so long as she doesn't cause him any trouble either.

Anna complies with reluctance, but later alerts Izzy of Phelan's reappearance and warns her about Gary's reaction to finding out as well. They manage to conceal Phelan's comeback from Gary until he spots him talking with Jason and Kevin at the garage. Gary goes to lash out at Phelan before his mother intervenes; with Gary's best-friend Zeedan Nazir (Qasim Akhtar) helping Anna separate her son from Phelan, whom Jason and Kevin subsequently take with them over to Weatherfield's local pub — The Rovers Return. In February 2016, Phelan sabotages the electrics in Kevin's garage to further cement his stay in Weatherfield and Anna takes the news about this so badly that she lashes out at him in a fit of rage; she grabs a sledgehammer and smashes Phelan's van windscreen before attacking him, an act which Kevin witnesses — causing him to accuse Anna of being too obsessed with her past and ends their relationship. The following day, Phelan visits Anna in the café and demands that she apologize to him in public. When she refuses and tries to stand up for herself, Phelan pins Anna against the wall and continues to threaten her until Kevin abruptly walks in — causing him to realize that she was right about him. Kevin promptly orders Phelan to leave, and he later refuses to help fix his damaged windscreen after learning from Anna the truth about their past. This subsequently leads to the two men clashing with each other, during which Kevin tries to warn Jason and his family about Phelan's nature to no avail. When they cross paths again at the Bistro, during which Kevin is dating Anna after their relationship is repaired, he pulls a prank on Phelan by ordering him some wine in a "kind" gesture — angering Phelan when he is forced by the staff to pay for his wine order.

Undeterred, Phelan manages to settle into his new life in Weatherfield and continues to build his companionship with Jason — up to the point where he spends most of his time at Jason's house and begins flirting with his mother, Eileen (Sue Cleaver). This effectively leads to the pair bonding with one another, but Eileen's boyfriend Michael Rodwell (Les Dennis) grows increasingly suspicious of Phelan and they quickly become enemies; with Phelan constantly antagonizing Michael in a plot to deteriorate his relationship with Eileen, who frequently berates a humiliated Michael whenever his efforts to investigate Phelan go too far. At one point, Michael confronts Phelan at Jason's yard and accuses him of stealing his chisels — which previously belonged to Jason's former boss Charlie Stubbs (Bill Ward); however, Michael ends up having a heart attack and is confined to crutches for a couple of months after getting hospitalized. When Phelan later provokes Michael into lashing out with a crutch in front of Eileen, she promptly breaks up with Michael and throws him out of her house. Phelan uses this opportunity to seduce Eileen and they proceed to form a relationship with each other. When Anna learns about this from Izzy, she plans on visiting Eileen to warn her about Phelan. However, Phelan — anticipating this — strikes first by fabricating a story to Eileen about how Anna fancied him and they had a one-night stand, which he claims to have immediately regretted; with Phelan admitting that his marriage with Valerie was beyond passionate and further states that Anna is crying rape because the result of their one-night stand had practically ended her relationship with Owen. This works successfully as Eileen would later dismiss Anna's warning about Phelan, sticking to his story about their "flinging past". Shortly after leaving Eileen's house, Anna bumps into Phelan and the pair grapple again; with Phelan grabbing Anna's arm and taunting her before leaving, though not before making it clear that he'll be staying in Weatherfield for as long as he pleases.

As time goes on, Phelan's growing involvement with Eileen and Jason builds up a feud between him and Jason's brother: Todd (Bruno Langley) — whom Gary has already warned about Phelan's nature. Whilst investigating his ulterior motives, Todd deduces that Phelan has vandalized the Jamila House Community Centre in order to secure Jason's beneficial partnership with the Freschos supermarket; however, Phelan manages to cover his involvement by sabotaging the CCTV footage that catches him preparing to vandalize the community centre. Though unable to stop Todd's interference, Phelan continues to get close with Jason and soon acts as a father figure towards him — particularly when Eileen informs Jason that his father, Tony Stewart (Terence Maynard), has died from a heart attack. Phelan comforts Jason as he grieves over his father's death, and later comes to his defence when he gets into a fight with Aidan Connor (Shayne Ward) — the boyfriend of Jason's ex-lover, Eva Price (Catherine Tyldesley) — at The Rovers; in Jason's defence, Phelan pins Aidan against a booth and threatens him before his father Johnny (Richard Hawley) arrives to witness his son being throttled. When Phelan ignores his demand to release his son, Johnny punches him to save Aidan and the pair nearly brawl until they are forced to settle down; Phelan later has another run-in with Johnny and, rejecting his apology, promises to get even with him one day before leaving when Johnny's girlfriend, Jenny Bradley (Sally Ann Matthews), intervenes.

In June 2016, Phelan hatches a plot to usurp Jason and takeover his construction company: the Builder's Yard. He first takes advantage of Jason's grievance by implicating him for the murder of his late enemy, Callum Logan (Sean Ward) — an act which leads Callum's close friend, Gemma Winter (Dolly-Rose Campbell), to break up with Jason after they recently formed a relationship together. Phelan then proceeds to sabotage Jason's venture, first by stealing his newly arrived windows from the builder's yard — which Phelan had deliberately left unlocked — and then arranging for his van to be torched under the guise that Callum's associates were behind it. The pressure soon grows too much for Jason and he decides to leave Weatherfield for a fresh start in Thailand, allowing Phelan to take control of the Builder's Yard and become Weatherfield's new landlord. With his newfound position, Phelan begins to exploit Jason's operation by increasing the pay rises from several local residents — even though Jason left Eileen to manage his organization during his absence. In the midst of rising to power in Weatherfield, Phelan ends up swindling a number of Weatherfield residents on multiple occasions; amongst these people include local newsagent Norris Cole (Malcolm Hebden) and restaurant owner Robert Preston (Tristan Gemmill). On the former incident, Phelan arranges for Norris to lose a shipment of tiles for his broken roof at The Kabin — causing Norris to accept Phelan's "help" in getting the roof fixed at a cheaper rate. On the latter incident, Phelan impairs the Bistro's electrics at the request of Robert's successor Nick Tilsley (Ben Price) to trick Robert into thinking that the problem should be checked by the person who installed them. Eventually, Phelan seizes an opportunity to move into Eileen's house when they learn that Todd has recently embarked on an affair with local vicar Billy Mayhew (Daniel Brocklebank) — who is in a relationship with Jason and Todd's adopted brother, Sean Tully (Antony Cotton). This is successful after Phelan manipulates Sean into believing that Eileen knew about Todd and Billy's affair, prompting him to move out of the house when he forces Eileen to choose either him or Todd — and she ends up choosing Todd. After moving into her house, Phelan continues to increase his relationship with Eileen; however, he finds this fuelling his conflict with Todd thus escalating it at the same time — particularly when Todd pranks Phelan in the shower after finding out that his actions have caused Jason to leave Weatherfield and Sean to move out of the house respectively.

In August 2016, Phelan formulates a plan to steal Jason's £65,000 inheritance; he summons his old friend Vinny Ashford (Ian Kelsey), a crooked property developer, over to Weatherfield and the two discuss their plans on launching a scam project called "Calcutta Street" — which consists of a development of non-existent flats. Their first act is to get the planning permission confirmed from the local council; to do this, Phelan negotiates with Kevin's ex-wife Sally Metcalfe (Sally Dynevor) — the recently elected Mayor of Weatherfield — in order to gain her approval. At first, she agrees with his proposition but later considers withdrawing her support when Todd points out that the local community youth centre may be demolished as a result. Needing to acquire a building so he can pull forward with extra affordable housing, Phelan manipulates café worker Alex Warner (Liam Bairstow) into using his film club for Calcutta Street's redevelopment — an act which secures Sally's consent when she promises to speak to the committee on his behalf. With all obstacles now removed, Phelan persuades Eileen to convince Jason into using his £65,000 investment for the project. In doing so, he and Vinny manage to get their planning application accepted — thus enabling them to put their scam project into fruition. However, Todd's constant interfering leads him to discover the scam himself. After rejecting his offer to be invited to work on the project, Todd reports Phelan to the police for fraud and his mother's supposed departure; however, Phelan is released due to lack of evidence and the fact that Eileen has gone on a holiday — which Vinny helped Phelan carry out in order to prevent Todd from alerting her of his discovery about the scam. When Todd once again threatens to expose their fraudulent scheme, Phelan warns him that Vinny had originally planned to kill him and Eileen because of his constant interference. He eventually convinces Todd to put their differences aside for his mother's sake, and the two subsequently work together in helping Vinny complete the scam development — though Todd makes Phelan promise that his family will be protected and refunded at all costs.

In October 2016, Phelan becomes unnerved when Eileen and Vinny start to doubt each other midway through the course of the scam; with Eileen growing concerned over the "Calcutta Street" development after learning that Vinny has not hired any contractors for the operation, and Vinny becoming enraged at Eileen for spending his £30,000 on a shipment of tiles without his consent. At first, Phelan is able to medicate their differences in order to prevent Eileen from discovering the scam, but she continues to grow suspicious of Vinny and later finds out from her next-door neighbor Tyrone Dobbs (Alan Halsall) that Vinny has gone to a casino. Eileen, suspecting Vinny of planning to con them, insists that Phelan takes her to confront him at the casino; he obliges, but not before calling Vinny to warn him that Eileen is planning to intercept them. As it turns out, Vinny has met up with his consociate Russ (Tomi May) to collect fake passports for himself and Phelan. When he and Eileen arrive at the casino, Phelan is relieved when Vinny manages to convince her that his intentions are otherwise and that Russ — addressed as "Mr. Russell" — is one of his potential buyers. In response, Eileen apologises to Vinny for disrupting his meeting and returns home with Phelan. Back in Weatherfield, Phelan berates Eileen for her interference and accuses her of not trusting him. This nearly ends their relationship, but Phelan later makes amends by cooking Eileen dinner to apologize for snapping at her. Eileen forgives Phelan and she resumes helping him out on his unsuspecting scam project, but later decides to reclaim her old job at the "Street Cars" taxi company at Phelan's insistence. Nevertheless, their relationship continues and Phelan soon proposes to Eileen; she accepts his proposal and they celebrate their engagement at the pub.

In November 2016, Michael grows concerned over the "Calcutta Street" development and concludes that Phelan has been defrauding the residents of Weatherfield over the last few months — with him and Vinny seizing all the cash deposits from several victims, including Gary's girlfriend Sarah Platt (Tina O'Brien); Jenny's foster mother Rita Tanner (Barbara Knox); and Zeedan's grandmother Yasmeen Nazir (Shelley King) for themselves. Michael's theory grows as Phelan attempts to con Yasmeen's ex-husband Sharif (Marc Anwar) and later Alex himself, though the latter is spared when his aunt Cathy Matthews (Melanie Hill) acquires him a flat that isn't amongst the "Calcutta Street" apartments. After preventing his friend Freddie Smith (Derek Griffiths) from getting conned by the duo in a poker game, Michael seeks Anna's help in exposing Vinny's scam so Phelan can be brought to justice. Ironically, Anna's adoptive daughter Faye (Ellie Leach) had unwittingly stolen Phelan's phone and Anna — who had initially refused to help Michael in a bid to move on from Phelan — became aware of the scam herself upon discovering this. Working together against their shared enemy, Michael breaks into Vinny's yard to extract evidence whilst Anna invites Phelan in an attempt to delay him. She tries to bribe Phelan into leaving Weatherfield with £2,000 after confronting him about their differences, with Anna pointing out that he is merely just using Eileen since their relationship had begun, but he rejects her offer and is just about to leave when his phone suddenly rings — causing Phelan to learn of the conspiracy. After answering the call to confirm his suspicions, Phelan leaves Anna after promising to make her regret "crossing him" before smashing her house out of anger. He then confronts Michael at the yard with a crowbar just as the latter gets hold of Phelan's fake passport. Initially calling his bluff of reporting him to the police, knowing that doing so would expose his involvement in the scam, Michael grows uneasy when Phelan makes clear his intent to kill him. With his life in danger and unable to persuade Phelan to turn himself in, Michael throws a chair at him and flees from the yard — with Phelan in pursuit. When crossing paths again, Michael suffers a heart attack when he makes a break for it and pleads for help from an unfazed Phelan. Rather than help his rival as he previously did before, Phelan reclaims his passport and — declaring victory in the feud between them — tells Michael that his "time is up", further linking his fate to a rabbit that Phelan had once shot with an air rifle; with Phelan subsequently watching the rabbit die as he didn't have the "bottle" to put it out its misery. Phelan then goes to clear out the mess that was left at the site office, leaving Michael for dead in the process. Anna alerts Gary to the situation and he heads down to confront Phelan but does not notice a dying Michael succumbing to his heart attack and taking his last breath. Once all is settled, Phelan approaches Michael's corpse and silently bids him goodbye with a sign of the cross before walking away.

Phelan later alerts Vinny to what happened and, informing him about Michael's death as well as the impact he has left on them, suggests that the pair leave immediately to avoid any further suspicion. On the day of their scheduled departure from Weatherfield, however, Phelan discovers that Vinny has already left the country for Hawaii upon chatting with his landlady (Jacqueline Pilton). Unable to contact Vinny as the number has been disconnected, Phelan calls the bank to confirm his fears that all the money from the business account has been withdrawn; he screams Vinny's name in rage upon learning of his betrayal. Phelan soon returns home to Eileen and Todd, who informs him of Michael's death. Phelan feigns shock about Michael, but secretly confides in Todd that Vinny has left with the money and gone abroad. Phelan is later questioned by the police about Michael's death and Vinny's escape, but he manages to cover his involvement in both circumstances. However, when Eileen notices the police questioning him, Phelan is forced to come clean and is promptly slapped by a furious Eileen; she then kicks him out of the house. When Todd organises a meeting with the residents involved in Calcutta Street, Phelan arrives at the last minute to take responsibility for the scam — admitting that he is solely to blame due to his association with Vinny, whereas both Eileen and Todd are completely innocent because of it. Though this leads many residents to resent him over the scam ordeal, Eileen forgives Phelan for his actions and the pair slowly reconcile to resume their wedding plans — after Michael's funeral. Towards the end of the year, Phelan learns that Anna has been sending multiple letters of complaint against him and Eileen over the scam and later threatens her.

Kevin soon learns about the threat made against Anna and confronts Phelan, nearly attacking him when Phelan reacts indifferently until fellow mechanic Luke Britton (Dean Fagan) intervenes to separate the pair.

Later on that night, Phelan gets struck over the head with a brick by Luke's best friend: Andy Carver (Oliver Farnworth) — who correctly assumes that Phelan murdered Michael, whom Andy recently had a surrogate father-son relationship with even though the pair weren't actually related. Phelan, however, survives the attack and subsequently blackmails Andy into performing a series of petty crimes under the threat of reporting him to the police and having him charged with attempted murder. After forcing Andy to steal money and later tablets from the Bistro, Phelan begins to coerce him into sabotaging Kevin's business — culminating when Andy is forced to set fire to his garage, though not before Phelan personally spikes Kevin's drink to distract the mechanic long enough for Andy to proceed with his deed. When Andy sets the garage on fire, however, he steals the laptop containing CCTV footage of Phelan and Todd talking about "Calcutta Street" and their involvement within the scam project. He soon explains this to his girlfriend, Luke's sister Steph (Tisha Merry), upon confessing to everything due to Phelan's blackmail; Steph, though angry at Andy, forgives him when she learns that Phelan threatened to harm her as well. Planning to leave for Portugal together, Steph goes along while Andy stays behind to incriminate Phelan. His attempt is halted when Phelan arrives to bid him farewell, only to discover the laptop in the room which is playing the CCTV footage video of him and Todd unknowingly incriminating themselves. Things get heated when Phelan realizes that Andy is recording their conversation about the scam and Michael, which quickly turns into a confrontation when Andy knocks Phelan out for taunting him over Michael. Rising to his feet, Phelan engages Andy in a brawl and gets the upper hand despite being pummeled multiple times. He then grabs the laptop and, recalling this story to have a different ending in contrast to "the bad guy getting his comeuppance", smashes Andy on the head with it — supposedly killing him. After sending a text to Steph from Andy's mobile phone to dump her, causing her to leave the country alone, Phelan goes on to meet Eileen at the wedding reception where they get married; with Todd and Billy present as well.

It is soon revealed in mid-August 2017 that Andy has been alive the whole time, but has been chained up in the cellar of an abandoned property and Phelan has kept him captive since their last confrontation on his and Eileen's wedding day; this explains Phelan's admission during his church visit, as well as the number of times that he has been skulking behind his wife's back — including the reason behind a black eye he got a couple of months ago. Since keeping Andy captive for eight months, Phelan has psychologically tormented him through near-death experiences and torture; with Phelan forcibly restraining Andy when he attempts to strange his captor in a failed attempt to escape at one point, and later nearly executing him with a shovel when Andy feels unwell following the incident in another stage. Phelan initially contemplates leaving Andy to die, but has a change of heart after overhearing Nicola telling Billy how appreciated she feels towards him since the DNA test; Phelan acquires some antibiotics from Eileen's best friend Liz McDonald (Beverley Callard) at the dentist, feigning a toothache to cover up his secret, before delivering them to Andy — saving his life in the process. When Liz informs Eileen about Phelan's visit to the dentist, she confronts him at the house just as Phelan is checking up on Andy's condition. Eileen nearly discovers Phelan's secret, but he manages to stall her — surprisingly with Andy's help; Eileen takes the bait when Phelan claims that he is working on getting them a new home using the abandoned property. In apparent gratitude for not blowing his secret, Phelan decides to let Andy go free and arranges for him to get out of the country for a new life in France. On the way to the airport, Phelan crashes his van and is seemingly left unconscious. At first, Andy calls an ambulance, but quickly uses this opportunity to make a break for it. However, Phelan awakens and catches up to Andy before telling him that his promised "freedom" was actually a test of demonstrating his loyalty. Phelan then recaptures Andy by knocking him out before taking his prisoner back to the warehouse, where Eileen confronts him once more with Nicola's help — as the pair have found themselves deceived by Phelan into thinking that he had left town for a job at Inverness. After managing to cover-up his reasons once again, Phelan brings Andy back to the cellar and tells him that he will be staying there until he comes up with a better solution on how to truly solve the ongoing problem between them.

Towards the end of September 2017, Phelan becomes unsettled when Daniel begins to use the "Calcutta Street" incident for his latest journalism idea and soon ends up questioning a number of residents — including Tyrone's fiancée Fiz Stape (Jennie McAlpine) and even Anna herself — about their theories on the scam. This evidently builds up a conflict between the pair when Phelan confronts Daniel at his flat; with Daniel making it clear that he intends to expose his involvement in the scam, prompting Phelan to warn Daniel that he will "hurt him" should he continue to pursue his newspaper article project. Ignoring Phelan's threat, Daniel resumes his investigation until Phelan ends up catching him in a passionate position with his boss: Cindy Watson (Esther Hall). Their "interaction" allows Phelan to obstruct Daniel's trial before gathering information on Cindy, culminating when he finds out that she is married. He then proceeds to entrap Daniel and Cindy at the Bistro, where her husband Ross (Anthony Brophy) walks in on them; Ross threatens Daniel to stay away from his wife before ordering Cindy to leave with him, thus causing Daniel to stop investigating the story any further.

However, Daniel's curiosity leads Phelan to Vinny's mother: Flora McArdle (Eileen Davies). It transpires that Vinny's real name is Harvey McArdle, and Phelan begins to contact Vinny from Flora's care home in order to get his money back and exact revenge on Vinny for his betrayal. Upon blackmailing Vinny into returning to Weatherfield, Phelan informs Andy that Vinny will be his replacement prisoner once the latter has been captured; Andy had earlier made an initially rejected bargain with Phelan that he would acquire another prisoner, who Andy would then keep hostage if Phelan were to let him go. After surviving an assassination attempt, Phelan surprises Vinny when he arrives to save Flora the next day. Phelan punches Vinny before giving him an ultimatum; either Vinny delivers the money, or Phelan would kill Flora to show the pair what he's truly capable of doing. Vinny complies and manages to deliver the money to Phelan, but is then knocked out when Phelan appears to take him to see his mother; Phelan assures Vinny that his mother is safe — before latter telling him that the opposite is the case. Phelan then takes the captured Vinny to meet Andy, whom he had earlier manipulated into believing that Vinny had killed Michael. When Vinny awakens and vows to kill his ex-cohort, Phelan secretly instructs Andy to kill Vinny in order to secure his freedom. Andy becomes extremely hesitant but is unable to change Phelan's insistence. After knocking Vinny unconscious, Phelan takes him and Andy to an abandoned warehouse for Vinny's execution. There, Vinny jumps on Phelan; however, Andy untimely warns his captor — allowing Phelan to brutally subdue Vinny before forcing Andy to drag his body into the warehouse. Phelan then gives Andy a gun, which Phelan had secretly acquired earlier on to carry out his plot against Vinny, and begins to pressure his captive in fulling his deed by fabricating a story about Michel's death — professing how Vinny told him that he relished in watching Michael die rather than finishing him off. Vinny slowly regains consciousness, but it's too late as Andy ultimately gives in and shoots at his fellow prisoner — killing Vinny in front of Phelan. A guilt-ridden Andy proceeds to turn the gun on Phelan, who manages to reclaim the weapon after talking his captive out of it. However, rather than letting Andy go as promised, Phelan instead turns the gun on him and — ignoring his desperate appeals that he isn't a murderer — pulls the trigger on Andy, killing him. He "apologizes" to Andy for granting him death, but states that he wouldn't have been able to live with himself for murdering Vinny. After reciting a prayer at the corpses, Phelan dumps the bodies in a nearby lake before returning to Eileen. They later went on a holiday together for a couple of weeks, but upon returning learn that their new house — where Phelan had kept Andy captive — was involved in an arson attack; it soon turns out that Phelan had discreetly organized the arson attack by bribing two hooligans to burn the house down. Using the money that he forced Vinny to deliver prior to killing him, Phelan takes the opportunity to repay all the Calcutta Street victims — creating goodwill in the Weatherfield community, and thus cheering up Eileen as she was saddened over the arson attack.

It was at this point, however, that Nicola had learned about her father's past with Anna when they were both called into hospital after Seb had been involved in a ladder accident — with Anna finding him and calling an ambulance. As they waited for Seb's recovery that night, Anna struck a conversation with Nicola before eventually describing the events with her father from 2014; with Anna explaining how Phelan blackmailed her into sleeping with him after tormenting Gary and Owen. This prompted Nicola into visiting her mother's old friend Lydia Hartman (Susan Twist) the next day, seeking out answers on Phelan's nature; with Nicola having noticed Lydia's horrific reaction at seeing an image of Phelan on her phone from the last time she recently visited at her house. Nicola learns that the last time Lydia saw Phelan was on the night he had a fight with Annabel's lover Isaac, and on the following day Annabel had told Lydia that Phelan had forced himself onto her. When Nicola demands to know the truth behind her origins, she is horrified when Lydia reveals that she was told by Annabel that Phelan had forced himself on her — causing Nicola to realize that Phelan had actually raped her mother, in contrast to his original claim of having had an affair with Annabel, just nine months before she herself was born. An enraged Nicola summoned Phelan to her late parents' bench, whereupon she confronts him over the allegations made by Anna and Lydia. He unsuccessfully attempts to assuage her suspicions by proclaiming his love for her mother, stating that Annabel wanted to save her marriage to Isaac — precisely relating to Anna's story. This escalates into an argument when Phelan argues that Anna is to blame for her ordeal, only for Nicola to brand him a rapist upon realizing that Anna and Lydia were both telling the truth about him; Phelan overreacts when Nicola ends up calling him evil and pleads with her to believe his version of events, but she refuses and angrily disowns him in response. Though she initially plans to tell Eileen the truth about him, Nicola instead decides to leave Weatherfield, at Anna's suggestion, to avoid Phelan.

Upon learning that Anna had exposed their past to Nicola behind his back, Phelan hatches a spiteful plot to frame her for Seb's ladder accident in an act of revenge. His scheme indirectly comes to fruition after Phelan seizes Anna's earring from an earlier altercation between then — in which he taunted her over Kevin's recent affair with Erica Holroyd (Claire King) and Katy's coincidental death from a road collision; Katy previously left Weatherfield with her son Joseph to be with her mother Linda Hancock (Jacqueline Leonard) in Portugal after failing to help Owen overcome his ordeal with Phelan, which partly led to Owen's departure from Weatherfield after his relationship with Anna ended, and her resulting death leads to Joseph staying with his father and Fiz's brother Chesney (Sam Aston) — next-door to Phelan's house. Phelan first executes his revenge plan on Anna by infiltrating Todd's workplace at the "Barlow Legal Service" — where Seb fell off his ladder — and then tricking his personal assistant, Kevin's older daughter Rosie (Helen Flanagan), into believing that Todd has sent him to collect his guide book from the building; Rosie's negligence allows Phelan to secretly plant Anna's earring at Todd's office. Afterwards, he visits Seb at the hospital and whispers into his ear that Anna wanted him dead — causing him to believe that she pushed him off the ladder. Because of Seb's misinterpretation and the earring's discovery, Anna is arrested when she is accused of the crime; though she is released without charge and quickly discovers Phelan's scheme. When she confronts him over his plan to set her up for Seb's accident, Phelan reveals to Anna that Gary got Nicola pregnant — following a recent one-night stand between them — and threatens to secure her imprisonment unless she and Gary have Nicola return to Weatherfield. Anna seemingly complies with Phelan's ultimatum, but later attempts to extract a confession from him after hearing the news that he repaid all the "Calcutta Street" victims. She invites Phelan over to her house for a drink under the guise of putting their differences aside; however, he smells a rat when she questions his motives of framing her and cunningly denies his involvement in Seb's accident — leading a furious Anna to throw him out after her plan has failed. Unable to blackmail Anna into bringing Nicola back to Weatherfield, Phelan visits Seb that night and proceeds to manipulate him into believing that she pushed him off the ladder; Anna is subsequently arrested once more, and she ends up being remanded in custody until her trial starts in January 2018.

In December 2017, Phelan hires a private investigator to track down his daughter in Manchester and proceeds to have Gary visit Nicola in an attempt to convince her to return to Weatherfield — threatening to expose their one-night stand to Sarah otherwise. Gary seemingly complies, but secretly advises Nicola to leave the country so she could escape Phelan for good; in response, Phelan turns Faye and Seb against Gary by manipulating the pair into moving in to his house. This enrages Gary, who thereafter tells Faye about Phelan raping their mother. At first, Faye misinterprets the belief that her mother's motive of sleeping with Phelan was for money, but she soon confronts him when the pair learn that Anna has escaped prison in the midst of being rushed to hospital — with Faye catching Phelan's delightful reaction to hearing the news of her mother's situation. Phelan tries to avoid answering Faye's question about his past with Anna, but is unable to contain the pressure from Faye's questioning and inadvertently frightens her out of the house after calling her mother a "waste of space". Faye thereupon moves back with Gary after realizing the troubles that Phelan inflicted upon their family, and they manage to secretly bring their mother back to Weatherfield undetected; with Faye's friend Craig Tinker (Colson Smith), an adolescent special constable, providing reluctant assistance on the Windass' behalf.

After reuniting with her children and taking refuge at her workplace, "Roy's Rolls", Anna decides to prove her innocence by infiltrating Phelan's yard and then investigating his scheme against her. Gary accompanies his mother with the plan and manages to get Phelan out of the yard by tricking him into believing that Nicola has been rushed to the hospital. Anna sneaks into the yard unnoticed while Gary leads Phelan away from Weatherfield. While attempting to gain progress in uncovering Phelan's strategy, Anna hears someone entering into the yard and — believing the person to be Phelan — ends up lashing out with a bolt cutter; however, she is mortified to find that she knocked out Eileen instead. Horrified at what she has done, Anna rushes out of the yard to plan a getaway escape with Faye. In the meantime, Phelan has realized that Nicola never called in sick and abandons Gary at the hospital when he attempts to further lead his enemy astray. Upon arriving back at the yard, Phelan finds Anna just as she returned to check up on Eileen and she flees to make her getaway escape; Phelan proceeds to call an ambulance for Eileen and the police on Anna, which results in the latter getting rearrested after she and Faye are unable to make their getaway escape. When Phelan later visits her and threatens her family in his promise to exact further revenge on Eileen's mistaken attack, she lashes out and slaps him across the face — provoking him into pressing charges for assault.

In early January 2018, on the verge of Anna's trial starting, Phelan finds himself pressured with Luke studying the events of Andy's disappearance from one of his wire houses — which Eileen had found in the burned out house where Phelan had kept Andy captive; the wire house was given to Rosie's sister Sophie (Brooke Vincent), who then gave it to Luke when he recalled how Andy always liked making wire houses. Phelan resorts to obstructing Luke's investigation on Andy and starts by giving him a false address of Andy's location in Birmingham, causing Luke to be sent on a while goose chase until he returns with no new leads. When Luke resumes with his quest to uncover Andy's whereabouts, Phelan bribes his childhood friend Matt Luscombe (Sebastian Shaw) into letting Luke believe that Andy had left Weatherfield for Bristol. However, Luke soon realizes that something is up after catching Phelan and Matt discussing their agreement at a restaurant. After forcing an explanation from Matt, who truthfully states that he has no idea where Andy is. Luke heads over to confront Phelan at the site near the same warehouse where Andy was murdered. At first Phelan attempts to deceive Luke into believing that Andy is playing him for a fool, reminding him how Andy once tricked Michael into believing that he was his real son Gavin (Mark Holgate), but ends up escalating Luke's curiosity when he realizes that Phelan is avoiding all his questions. As their conversation slowly becomes argumentative, Luke suspects that Phelan is hiding something from him and decides to report Andy as a missing person to the police. Phelan, realizing that Luke is getting too close to the truth about Andy, sneaks up behind him and smacks Luke on the head with a rock; however, Luke fights back and knocks Phelan onto the ground before retreating in his car. Phelan pursues Luke in the van and, after a spectacular car chase between them, manages to crash his car into a wall, totalling it and injuring Luke. Knowing that he could expose his secret about Andy's fate, Phelan shoots Luke as the young mechanic desperately attempts to escape out of his car and proceeds to fire two gunshots at its petrol tank — causing the vehicle to instantaneously explode, destroying it and killing Luke in the process; in his last moments, Luke learned the truth about Andy when Phelan indirectly revealed his fate.

The next morning, Phelan feigns surprise when the residents find out about Luke's death after the police turn up on the street to inform his girlfriend: Yasmeen's granddaughter Alya (Sair Khan) of the devastating news. However, she assumes that the culprits are her former racist clients: "The Parker Brothers" — whom Luke had recently attacked for insulting Alya before getting arrested and later charged for their assault on New Year's Day 2018. With this theory, the truth about Luke's murder remains undiscovered and Phelan proceeds to cover-up his involvement by leading the local residents in a clap for Alya when she makes a public statement to the press about Luke — explaining how he defended her from the "Parker Brothers" before they burned down his garage in retaliation for their assault; the "Parker Brothers" are later arrested for Luke's murder, but they end up getting released without charge — which further convinces the Weatherfield residents of their guilt. On the day of Luke's funeral, Phelan grows unnerved when Steph reappears in Weatherfield to deliver a eulogy for her brother. He later attempts to offer his sympathies over her brother's death but is brushed off when Steph makes it clear that she already knows about Andy's ordeal. When Steph becomes determined to stay in Weatherfield once more, Gary seeks her help in his campaign against Phelan and the two plan on meeting each other in secret; with Steph intending to divulge Andy's ordeal to Gary. However, Phelan strikes first when he corners Steph at the garage and tricks her into believing that he wishes to send a personal message to Andy in Portugal — causing Steph to believe that Phelan has unfinished business with Andy, despite admitting to having no clue of his whereabouts. This succeeds in driving Steph out of Weatherfield again when she later leaves the street for Portugal, much to Gary's disappointment.

Although most of the residents are unaware of Phelan's involvement in Luke's murder, Seb grows increasingly suspicious with the rumours that Luke was gunned down and starts to assume that Phelan is the culprit — having recalled the night Phelan showed him the gun prior to Luke's death; after learning that Gary was due to work at Legacy Reach Paper Mill — the place where Andy and Vinny died — Phelan took an opportunity to incriminate Seb for their murders by deceiving his apprentice in touching the gun, which Phelan professes is to protect Eileen from Vinny after claiming to have received constant death threats over the scam incident. On the night of Luke's vigil, Phelan catches Seb sneaking through his tool box and confronts him over his suspicious attitude. Seb nervously claims to have searched for a bottle of whisky from their earlier drink-off, which Phelan had conducted on the night he carried out his plan to frame Seb for the killings but is forced to come clean about his anxiety regarding the circumstances behind Luke's death. To Seb's shock, Phelan reminds him that his fingerprints have already been imprinted onto the gun — causing his apprentice to realize that Phelan was the one who murdered Luke. Fearing that Phelan may kill him next, Seb leaves his house and goes to stay with his mother: Abi (Sally Carman), a struggling drug addict who recently lost custody of her twins Charlie and Lexi back in October 2017. Phelan bribes Abi for information on Seb's whereabouts, intending to use him for his ongoing scheme against Anna. However, Gary manages to find Seb first and reports Phelan to the police after learning that he killed Luke — only for Phelan to end up getting released without charge due to the lack of evidence. When Seb learns about Phelan's release, he attempts to leave Weatherfield and even refuses to help Gary prove his mother's innocence; in response, Gary forces Seb into a taxi with help from Faye's biological father Tim Metcalfe (Joe Duttine) and the pair urge him to do the right thing for Anna.

On the day of Anna's trial, Phelan testifies against her by recounting the time she slapped Seb across the face mere moments before his ladder accident occurred. He then expects his apprentice to confirm his story when Seb is called up next; to his surprise, however, Seb betrays Phelan by changing his statement and confirming Anna's story — pointing to Phelan as the perpetrator behind the incident, in front of the court. This apparently helps with Anna's case when Eileen starts to doubt her viewpoint on Phelan, up to the point when she secretly visits Anna in person to question her about his activities; Phelan moves out of the house to stay with Billy after learning about this from Eileen. As the trial continues, with Anna's longtime friend Roy Cropper (David Neilson) and Tim each giving their statements on her behalf, Eileen ends up uncovering CCTV footage of Gary and Tim accosting Seb in the taxi — causing her to believe that they coerced him in conspiring with Anna against her husband by retracting his story; she promptly delivers the evidence to court, thus destroying Seb's testimony and reconciling with Phelan. When Anna is called up to proclaim her innocence, she openly describes Phelan as the "monster" he truly is by disclosing her ordeal throughout their conflict — as well as blurting out what he did to Owen and Michael. Unfortunately, she fails to rebuild her case and Phelan becomes satisfied when Anna is later found guilty by the jury of GBH — thanks to Eileen's evidence. Anna, distraught with the verdict, hysterically brands Phelan "pure evil" as she gets dragged out of court, all the while Phelan takes the opportunity to gloat in front of her family and the rest of the court — without Eileen's presence, as she had already left the court once the verdict had been announced; Anna is later wrongfully sentenced to five years imprisonment off-screen.

On the day of Anna's sentencing, Phelan is surprised when Nicola turns up at the builder's yard — seeking forgiveness for the previous accusations she made against him. Phelan forgives Nicola and the pair seemingly move on from the past, much to Gary's anger. He instantly confronts them in the yard, where Nicola defends Phelan against Gary and requests the latter to move on so they can "build bridges" in the future. While Phelan is happy to have his daughter back at his side once more, it soon turns out that Nicola is actually using this in a plot to bring him down; she later invites Gary over to her place, where he finds out that Seb has taken refuge there since the trial's aftermath and told Nicola about what Phelan did to Anna and Luke. Initially skeptical, Gary reluctantly agrees to go through with her plan on investigating Phelan's crimes by seeking a job at the Legacy Paper Mill Reach — where Phelan has just secured his position as the site project's foreman after beating fellow designer Bill Thornhill (Aneirin Hughes) for the job; Phelan had contacted his associate George to uncover Bill's dodgy dealings, thus ousting Bill from the project in the process. Despite his reluctance, Phelan hesitantly employs Gary at Nicola's request to allow him to personally raise money for his impending child — with Nicola further stating that she will benefit for the child's upcoming future. However, he takes delight in tormenting Gary once more and later provokes him in the Rovers; with Phelan taunting Gary over the recent grooming of Sarah's daughter Bethany Platt (Lucy Fallon) back in 2017, and Tim being forced to separate Gary when he snaps and lunges at Phelan in response to this. Gary soon manages to build some progress on Phelan when his boss Mona Beattie (Rachel Logan) announces that the mill's lake is scheduled to be drained — leaving Phelan worried that Andy and Vinny's corpses will be found. In February 2018, Phelan begins to intercept Gary's campaign when he catches Faye visiting Nicola's flat; with Faye having received directions from Eileen's co-worker: Liz's son Steve (Simon Gregson). There, he follows Faye into the flat and disbelieves her claims that she is seeking Nicola's help with school bullying caused by her mother's imprisonment. Nicola, determined to prevent Phelan from finding Seb, feigns illness and he rushes her to the hospital — where the pair learn that Nicola will be producing a baby boy. Phelan is delighted that he has become a grandad to Nicola's child but continues to grow suspicious when he spots someone inside her flat shortly after dropping his daughter off. This prompts Phelan to slash Nicola's keys to her apartment, where he infiltrates the building and finds Seb lounging around in her flat. Phelan proceeds to fire Gary from the mill site job, shortly before the pair are rushed over to the hospital when Nicola collapses from her baby's kicking — though not while managing to make amends with Sarah after the discovery of her one-night stand with Gary. Though relieved that both Nicola and her unborn child are unharmed, Phelan confronts his daughter over her conspiracy and is devastated when she admits to believing Seb over his theory about Luke. Heartbroken at his daughter's betrayal, Phelan disowns Nicola before storming out in tears. He later explains the situation to Eileen and, telling her that she is the only person he trusts to "keep him going", states that Nicola can "go to hell" along with Gary and Seb.

Phelan manages to cope with Nicola's betrayal by supporting Eileen when they learn that Todd has been arrested for assaulting a policeman during an attempt to flee Weatherfield with his adopted daughter, Summer Spellman (Matilda Freeman), on Christmas Eve 2017. The couple subsequently take Summer to live with them when Billy becomes addicted to heroin, after reacquainting with his junkie brother Lee (Richard Crehan), in his desperate bid to subsist himself with the previous death of Ken's late daughter: Susan, who died from a road collision — which Billy had indirectly caused — back in February 2001. After rescuing Summer from being abducted by a stalking pedophile at her school, Phelan supports her when she confides to him about feeling responsible for the situation Eileen and Todd have been put through over Billy's ongoing troubles — including an incident with Susan's twin brother Peter (Chris Gascoyne) on Christmas Day 2017, which ended with the vicar getting injured and ending up being virtually paralyzed as a result. When Summer's homophobic grandmother Geraldine (Lynne Verrall) turns up at the house to regain custody of her granddaughter, Eileen stands up to her in Billy and Todd's honor before chucking Geraldine out of the house — much to Summer's relief and gratefulness; Summer later thanks the couple for their help in dealing with Geraldine, much to Phelan's gratification.

Following Anna's wrongful imprisonment, Phelan begins to turn Eileen against her friends in order to continue retaining their marriage with his wife's eternal trust over him — which starts to diminish her friendships with Liz and Tim in the process. On both occasions, he enrolls a conflict with Liz and Tim respectively; with Liz becoming offended after Phelan impolitely rejects her idea of talking Eileen for a holiday in Barcelona, while Tim grows resentful towards Phelan for his treatment of Anna and even contemplates leaving Weatherfield with Faye as their quarrel begins to deteriorate Tim's marriage to Sally. Upon realizing this, Eileen organizes a house party for Phelan and invites most of her friends to "know his character" — with Liz's fellow friend Moira Pollock (Louiza Patikas) and Tim's sister-in-law Gina Seddon (Connie Hyde) being amongst the attendees. However, she is left disappointed when her husband doesn't show up at the event; it turns out that Phelan's party is on the same day that the mill project's lake will be drained, prompting him to make a desperate attempt in relocating Andy and Vinny somewhere else. As Phelan works in cementing their corpses that night, his phone drops in the cement and he ends up falling himself whilst attempting to retrieve it. Phelan is left virtually unconscious but is saved when Eileen discovers him and phones an ambulance — with Tim's reluctant help. The following day, Phelan goes over to meet Tim in his taxi with a thank you card in gratitude for helping Eileen with the rescue. Tim nonetheless rejects his card and instead begins to call out Phelan on his nefarious activities. Though he denies causing the deaths of Michael and Luke, as well as Anna's wrongful conviction, Phelan gleefully reveals the truth about "Calcutta Street" — admitting that the project was indeed a scam and that he had been ripping the residents off in the first place. Phelan then leaves the taxi and heads back home, unaware that Tim had actually been recording his confession to Eileen as she listened through — causing her to finally learn the truth about "Calcutta Street". She instantly confronts Phelan for using Jason's inheritance to rip off her neighbors and getting Todd involved in the scam, further concluding that Michael and Anna had been telling the truth about Phelan regarding the "Calcutta Street" incident all along; Phelan is unable to victimize himself behind the crime, even when he points out that Vinny had ripped them off afterwards. Eileen later contemplates on reporting her husband to the police, but changes her mind at the last second when Phelan manages to win her over again by helping her out with Summer's ongoing situation with Billy; when the vicar's growing addiction leads him to steal Eileen's money and get Summer into trouble at school, a result which strains her friendships with Ken's grandchildren Amy (Elle Mulvaney) and Simon (Alex Bain) in the process, Phelan confronts Billy and coerces to go to rehabilitate his addiction by physically attacking him — before threatening to "come for him" should he "fail" Eileen once more.

Towards the end of March 2018, Phelan stages a getaway plan to escape Weatherfield — knowing that Tim's recording of his scam confession could potentially expose his other crimes as well. He forges a holiday trip with Eileen for the coming Easter and she agrees after Phelan tricks Summer into persuading his wife to go ahead with his plans, as Eileen had initially become uninterested with the idea; the couple leave Weatherfield for the holiday after dropping Summer off for a sleepover with local shopkeeper Dev Alahan (Jimmi Harkishin) and his children, Aadi (Zennon Ditchett) and Asha (Tanisha Gorey), at their house. As Phelan puts his escape plan into motion, Gary and Seb seek out the gun that he used to kill Luke near the site manager's office. In doing so, however, they end up unearthing the bodies of Andy and Vinny instead; Gary and Seb are formally arrested for the murders, but are quickly proven innocent when they learn about the bodies and explain the situation to their lawyer: Ken's grandson Adam (Sam Robertson) — who subsequently phones Tim about this. Tim promptly calls Eileen to warn her about the bodies at Phelan's worksite, exposing his murderous crimes in front of everyone at The Rovers in the process; Peter, who had been hosting a party to celebrate becoming the pub's new landlord with help from both his girlfriend Toyah Battersby (Georgia Taylor) and her stepsister Leanne (Jane Danson), calls off the party in response to Tim's phone call; while Steve disrupts his mother's date with his old school teacher, Mike Thornberry (Louis Emerick), to inform Liz of the revelation and Eileen's endangerment. At the same time, Phelan learns of the bodies' discovery and plans to leave the country on a boat — becoming distant from Eileen in the process. They soon row when Eileen catches Phelan on the boat and becomes angry as to why he needs some privacy from her during their holiday, culminating with Eileen hurting her foot and Phelan halting his escape plan to aid his wife. Phelan later phones a taxi for Eileen to return to Weatherfield, as she couldn't drive back home after losing his van keys from the ensuing argument. They bid goodbye to each and start to go their separate ways until Phelan realizing that Eileen has the boat keys and heads back to find her listening to Tim's voice message — thus confirming everyone's theory about him.

When she confronts her husband about the bodies that he buried at the worksite, Phelan — realizing that he has been exposed at last — chucks his wife's phone into the river and proceeds to enumerate the four deaths that he caused; Eileen becomes horrified to learn that not only is her husband indeed responsible for the deaths of Michael and Luke, but that Phelan also kept Andy as his prisoner in their would-be new home and ended up forcing him to kill Vinny before murdering Andy himself. After confessing to his killings, Phelan protests his wife's claims that he is incapable of love and insistently tells Eileen that he really does love her — recalling how they ended up becoming a potential family together as their relationship went on — with Phelan further stating that he once saved her and Todd when Vinny had planned to kill them during the "Calcutta Street" incident, before going on to explain how they convinced Nicola to keep her baby for its eventual birth. Outraged at the full extent of his crimes and the fact that Anna had been right about him all along, Eileen furiously brands Phelan a "murderer" and "rapist" before going on to berate him for destroying the lives of Todd and Anna. When she threatens to drop his getaway keys into the water, Phelan snaps and charges at her — only to end up falling over the edge. However, he manages to hang onto a rope and desperately begs Eileen for help as he struggles to make it up to safety — going as far as to claim that he knows where Todd is and, professing that he is in danger, would die if she doesn't help him up. This ultimately proves to be the last straw for Eileen, who responds by angrily stamping on her husband's fingers whilst repeatedly calling him a "liar"; Phelan eventually loses his grip and ends up falling into the rough sea below. Shortly afterwards, Eileen is safety recovered by Tim and Liz before the arriving police start searching for Phelan's body — with Phelan being presumed dead following his showdown with Eileen.

At the start of April 2018, Phelan's crimes are finally exposed when the police descend onto Weatherfield and interview most of the residents about his killings; with Gail learning the truth about Michael; while Tim informs Alya and her family that Phelan murdered Luke. By the time the bodies of Andy and Vinny have been recovered and subsequently identified, their fates end up becoming public knowledge as well — with Daniel telling Flora about Vinny when she finds out about his death, while Robert organizes a funeral for Andy upon hearing what Phelan had done to him. Meanwhile, Eileen spends a night at the police station when she gets arrested for abetting her husband in his criminal activities and is later interrogated by chef inspector DS Keith Willetts (James Quinn) about her knowledge of Phelan's crimes — more specifically about the "Calcutta Street" scam and Andy's captivity. She is eventually released without charge, thanks to the assistance of her lawyer and Yasmeen's grandson-in-law Imran Habeeb (Charlie de Melo), but quickly finds herself Weatherfield's public enemy — as several residents, specifically Alya and Faye, confront Eileen over her ignorance towards Phelan's nature. Despite this, Tim and Liz thoroughly support Eileen over her ordeal with Phelan; while both Nicola and Seb become friends with her again; and Gail — who was formerly Eileen's nemesis — comforts her over the fact that she herself had previously endured the same experience with her deceased killer husband, Richard Hillman (Brian Capron). However, as Eileen begins to slowly recover from her recent trauma and move on ahead with her own life, she is left unaware that Phelan has actually survived the fall and is nursing his way back to health at Mrs. Gillen's (Janie Booth) bedsit in Ireland — with Phelan having checked in under the alias on his false passport, "Alan Frost". Towards the end of the month, Phelan learns that Eileen and Nicola are involved in the "Free Anna Windass Campaign" — also known as "F.A.W.N." — that Daniel has organized to secure Anna's release. After he watches the pair join Anna's children and Seb in speaking out for her release, Phelan checks out of the hotel and plans his return to settle old scores.

In May 2018, Phelan takes refuge at a caravan park in Abergele — where he uses a false identity on a mother's social group to keep in contact with an oblivious Nicola. Towards the end of the month, Gary becomes suspicious with her mysterious contact and quickly finds out that it was Phelan after tracking his location in Wales — with help from his army friend, Joe Haslam (Chord Melodic). Intending to finish him for good, Gary attacks Phelan with a bat; however, he is quickly subdued and is on the verge of getting killed when Joe intervenes, knocking out Phelan with a rock. The pair brought Phelan back to Weatherfield and held him captive in the builder's yard, where Gary had planned to get revenge on him for what he did to his family. As Joe left Gary to proceed with his plan, however, Sarah confronted him and ended up discovering Phelan's captivity. As Sarah argued with Gary when he refuses to get the police involved about his return, Phelan is discovered by Kevin's young son Jack (Kyran Bowes) — whom he previously helped rescue Anna back on New Year's Day 2017 — and he attempts to bribe the youngster with a tender into setting him free. Jack nearly takes Phelan's bait until Gary and Sarah arrived back in the room; the couple manage to talk Jack out of freeing Phelan before sending him away, with the promise that he never saw Phelan. Once Jack has gone, Phelan taunts Gary with constant remarks about his mother that caused the latter to brutally hit his enemy with a plank of wood. When Sarah once again tries to convince Gary into calling the police, Phelan manages to free himself — thanks to Jack's earlier help — and attacks Gary with a chair. He then locked the builder's yard gate, retrieved his firearm, and forced the couple back into the garage. Holding them at gunpoint, Phelan orders Sarah to contact Nicola with Gary's phone and request that she come to the yard. Sarah instead calls Tim, not knowing that she is actually speaking to Kevin on the phone, to trick Phelan into thinking that she called Nicola; however, Phelan deduces this when Nicola doesn't turn up and he forces Gary to relinquish the code access on his phone — threatening to harm Sarah otherwise. After firing his unloaded gun at Sarah when she confirms his suspicions out of fear, Phelan locks her and Gary in the yard. He then makes his way discreetly over to Eileen's house, where she and Seb are looking after Nicola and Zac — who was merely born just moments ago. After tricking Nicola into letting him in, Phelan forces his way into the house where he meets Zac and spitefully tells Eileen that their "marriage" meant nothing — stating that it was all part of his original plan to cover-up his crimes. When Nicola attempts to prevent her father from coming near Zac, he threatens to shoot her. However, Seb secretly comes down the stairs and attacks Phelan with a screwdriver. Despite the efforts of the three attempting to subdue Phelan, he overpowers them — knocking out Eileen and Seb, but unintentionally shooting Nicola in the process.

Feeling guilty for shooting his own daughter, Phelan storms into the bistro — interrupting Robert's wedding to his co-partner, Michelle Connor (Kym Marsh) — with Nicola in his arms, begging for help. He instigates a siege and holds the couple along with their wedding guests, including Roy and Daniel, at gunpoint; amongst the hostages include Roy's friend Mary Taylor (Patti Clare), Daniel's girlfriend Sinead Tinker (Katie McGlynn), Jenny and her stepdaughter Kate (Faye Brookes), Zeedan's ex-wife Rana (Bhavna Limbachia), and Michelle's two sons Ali Neeson (James Burrows) and Ryan (Ryan Prescott) as well as her two sister-in-laws Maria (Samia Longchambon) and Carla (Alison King) — the latter of whom Phelan had previously helped save on the night he returned to Weatherfield back in January 2016, two years ago. At first, Phelan refuses to let the guests call an ambulance, and instead orders Roy to confiscate everyone's phones before telling Ali — a trainee general practitioner — to save Nicola under the threat of shooting his mother. However, as the sirens emerge onto the Bistro outside, Phelan relents and agrees to an ambulance for Nicola — whom he then apologizes to for everything he has put her through and solemnly gives her a goodbye kiss. After making Ali promise to save Nicola, with Maria and Rana stepping in to help out as well, Phelan requests a hostage and insists on taking Michelle — despite both Carla and Roy's offer to be taken captive themselves. Robert pleads with Phelan to take him captive instead, but Phelan refuses and threatens to kill the wedded couple after cloaking his gun; Michelle quickly relents in her soon-to-be husband's defense, and Phelan forces Robert and the others into a corner under the threat of shooting his bride-to-be should anyone follow them. Phelan drags Michelle into the kitchen and is on the verge of escaping when he turns to find Anna waiting for him; Daniel's campaign had been successful, leading to Anna being released since then, and she had secretly returned to Weatherfield after Gary had informed her of Phelan's comeback — which led to the kidnapping that Gary carried out at his mother's original plan to get Phelan to admit his wrongdoings before taking him to the police, only for Sarah's earlier interference to bring these events up to the Bistro siege as a result. With Phelan surprised to come face-to-face with Anna once again, Michelle uses this opportunity to manage herself in escaping his grasp; however, Phelan shoves Michelle away and shoots her in response. Anna then charges at Phelan with a knife and, just as he turns to shoot her, quickly stabs him in the chest — finally stopping Phelan as he drops his gun and slumps onto the floor in pain.

Robert thereupon bursts into the kitchen with Ali and Carla, before all three promptly rush over to Michelle for medical treatment. At that moment, Phelan pulls the knife from his chest — ignoring Ali's objections — in a last-ditch effort to get one over Anna by implicating her for his murder, despite knowing that he is going to die as a result. However, Michelle defends Anna upon saying the attack was self-defence and that she'll be willing to take the risk for her — as well as for Luke and Andy in retaliation for their murders. Anna then approaches her dying tormentor and, taunting Phelan over the fact that people like him don't get the victory, in the end, tells him that Zac will never remember his existence. After declaring that she won the longstanding conflict between them, Anna watches as Phelan does a light chuckle with his last breath before he succumbs to his stabbing and dies in front of her. Shortly afterwards, Michelle and Nicola are rushed to hospital — where the pair would end up recovering from their gunshot wounds — while Anna, after freeing Gary and Sarah from Phelan's captivity, meets Zac for the first time whilst reuniting with her family. She then informs Eileen of her husband's death, which is publicly rumored to be a suicide thanks to Anna and Michelle's cover-up, and the pair make amends with each other before resolving to move on from Phelan together; Anna, however, makes a decision to leave Weatherfield so she can move on from her past. A deceased Phelan is last seen when the residents of Coronation Street observe as his body is brought out and put in the private ambulance, signalling the end of his reign of terror once and for all.

Three years later, Todd (now Gareth Pierce) finds Phelan's ashes whilst working at George Shuttleworth's (Tony Maudsley) funeral parlour. George explains that he tried to contact Nicola but heard nothing from her and says he has not had a chance to talk to Eileen. George later scatters Phelan's ashes in a bin on Eileen's request, with George later commenting that Phelan "finally got the ending he deserves".

== Reception ==
The character Pat Phelan has proved popular with fans and its portrayer, Connor McIntyre, appeared as one of the three Coronation Street actors-nominees for a "Villain of the Year" at The British Soap Awards 2014. McIntyre won the "Villain of the Year" award at The British Soap Awards 2016 and was nominated for "Villain of the Year" once again at The British Soap Awards 2017. In August 2017, McIntyre was longlisted for "Best Actor" and "Best Bad Boy" at The Inside Soap Awards 2017, while the revelation that Andy is still alive was longlisted for "Best Shock Twist". The nominations for "Best Bad Boy" and "Best Shock Twist" made the viewer-voted shortlist. On 6 November 2017, McIntyre won the "Best Bad Boy" and "Best Shock Twist" accolades. On 2 June 2018, McIntyre won the award for "Villain of the Year" for the second time at The British Soap Awards 2018. Phelan's death was nominated for Biggest OMG Soap moment at the 2018 Digital Spy Reader Awards; it came in second place with 16.2% of the total votes. Phelan's supposed death came in third place for Best Soap Stunt with 13.9% of the total votes.

The kidnapping storyline which ended on 27 October 2017, with Phelan forcing Andy to shoot Vinny before shooting Andy himself, resulted in Ofcom receiving 390 complaints.

The character's storylines have provided the show with an increase in viewing figures, with episodes attracting audiences of around 8,000,000 in consolidated figures. The episode in which Eileen discovers Phelan's true colours and sends him falling into the sea achieved 9,380,000 viewers, a three-year ratings high for the show. The episode also achieved a 46% share for 16–34 year olds, which is the highest in that demographic since 2006. The second episode aired on 2 April which revealed Phelan to have survived his fall, reached a peak audience of 8,500,000. Phelan's final episodes also achieved high ratings, with the 1 June episode in which he was killed receiving an average audience of 8,660,000 on 28 day data.
