= List of Coronation Street characters introduced in 2014 =

Coronation Street is a British soap opera first broadcast on 9 December 1960. The following is a list of characters that appeared in 2014, by order of first appearance. All characters were introduced by series producer Stuart Blackburn. Sharif Nazir (Marc Anwar), the father of established character Kal Nazir (Jimi Mistry), made his first appearance in February. Steph Britton's (Tisha Merry) brother, Luke Britton (Dean Fagan), and a new love interest for Gail McIntyre (Helen Worth), Michael Rodwell (Les Dennis), began appearing from March. Kal's daughter, Alya Nazir (Sair Khan), arrived in June, while Kal's mother and Sharif's wife, Yasmeen Nazir (Shelley King), turned up in July. In August, recurring character Dr. Susan Gaddas (Christine Mackie) made her first appearance, as well as Steve McDonald's (Simon Gregson) enemy, Dean Upton (Justin Moorhouse). Kal's son, Zeedan Nazir (Qasim Akhtar), joined in September, completing the Nazir family. Kylie Platt's (Paula Lane) old friends, Gemma Winter (Dolly-Rose Campbell) and Macca Hibbs (Gareth Berliner), appeared from October, as well as Callum Logan (Sean Ward), the father of Kylie's young son, Max Turner (Harry McDermott). Andy Carver (Oliver Farnworth) made his debut in November pretending to be Gavin Rodwell, Michael's long-lost son. New vicar and love interest for Sean Tully (Antony Cotton), Billy Mayhew (Daniel Brocklebank), and Erica Holroyd (Claire King), a friend of Liz McDonald (Beverley Callard) and love interest for Nick Tilsley (Ben Price), were introduced in December.

== Sharif Nazir ==
Sharif Nazir
- Coronation Street character
- Portrayed by: Marc Anwar
- Duration: 2014–2016
- First appearance: Episode 8330; 24 February 2014
- Last appearance: Episode 9028; 4 November 2016
- Introduced by: Stuart Blackburn
In-universe information
- Wife: Yasmeen Nazir (until 2018)
- Sons: Kal Nazir; Idris Nazir
- Grandsons: Zeedan Nazir
- Granddaughters: Alya Nazir

Sharif Nazir, played by Marc Anwar, made his first screen appearance on 24 February 2014. The character and casting was announced on 13 January 2014. Sharif is the father of Kal Nazir (Jimi Mistry), who was introduced in December 2013, and is a member of the show's first Muslim family. The show's producer, Stuart Blackburn commented that he was "loving him on paper already" and added "Sharif retired some time ago. He isn't rich, but he'd made enough money. We imagine that there were some health problems and his wife said, 'Now you're no longer going to go to work 12 hours a day!'" He was Kal's father and the husband of Yasmeen Nazir (Shelley King). In August 2016, it emerged that Sharif has been having an affair for seven years with Sonia Rahman (Sudha Bhuchar). Anwar was fired from the show in September 2016 after he wrote a series of racist posts on Twitter. His character was written out and he departed off-screen. He made his last appearance on the episode aired 4 November 2016 when he was evicted by Yasmeen, after confessing his affair with Sonia.

== Luke Britton ==
Luke Britton
- Coronation Street character
- Portrayed by: Dean Fagan
- Duration: 2014–2018
- First appearance: Episode 8334; 3 March 2014
- Last appearance: Episode 9346; 5 January 2018
- Introduced by: Stuart Blackburn
In-universe information
- Occupation: Mechanic
- Sisters: Steph Britton

Luke Britton, played by Dean Fagan, made his first screen appearance on 3 March 2014. The character and casting was announced on 1 December 2013. Luke is the brother of established character Steph Britton (Tisha Merry) and was introduced as a replacement for Tommy Duckworth, after Chris Fountain was fired from the show for posting inappropriate videos online. Billed as "hunky", Luke is a mechanic, who finds employment at Kevin Webster's (Michael Le Vell) garage. His sister gets him the job after hearing about the open position. Colin Daniels from Digital Spy reported that Steph is "very protective" of Luke. During his review of the upcoming soap characters, Jon Horsley from Yahoo! TV said viewers should be excited for Luke's arrival, saying "Well, he's hunky, handy with a spanner and sure to stir things up. Let's just hope he doesn't start any online rapping."

Luke first arrives in Weatherfield to help his sister, Steph, move into the flat that was previously owned by her best friend Tina McIntyre (Michelle Keegan). Later, he started work at the garage. Luke soon comforted Steph over Tina's death, with the help from her close friend Katy Armstrong (Georgia May Foote). He and Carla Connor (Alison King) got drunk and went back to her flat together but he left, not wanting to take advantage of her. He later offered to have a word with Nick Tilsley (Ben Price) after he was nasty to Steph. He was in a romantic relationship with Maria Connor (Samia Ghadie) which came to an end when, unknown to him, she slept with Aidan Connor (Shayne Ward). He also had romantic relationships with Tracy Barlow (Kate Ford) and Alya Nazir (Sair Khan).

The character made a surprise departure on 5 January 2018 when he became the latest murder victim of Pat Phelan (Connor McIntyre). He confronts Phelan over the disappearance of his best-friend and Steph's boyfriend: Andy Carver (Oliver Farnworth), unaware that Phelan had killed Andy after keeping him captive for nearly the entirety of 2017. When Phelan is unable to shake Luke of his suspicions, Luke grows to suspect Phelan is hiding something and intends to report Andy missing to the police. However, as Luke goes over to his car, Phelan sneaks up behind him and hits Luke over the head with a rock to stop him reporting his crime — only for Luke to punch Phelan in response and knock him temporarily unconscious. Luke drives off in his car, but is pursued by Phelan; a car chase ensues between the duo that culminates with Phelan ramming Luke into a wall, injuring him. Unable to restart his car or escape it, Luke can only watch as Phelan menacingly approaches him with a gun. He shoots Luke with impact, then reverses his van into the rear side of Luke's broken car. There, Phelan indirectly confesses to killing Andy upon telling Luke that he's succeeded in finding him. As a dying Luke reels at this revelation whilst lying helpless in the vehicle, Phelan — after apprising Luke to tell Andy "say hello from me" — points the gun at the petrol tank and shoots it twice, triggering a huge explosion that kills Luke and destroys his vehicle.

News of Luke's death becomes public knowledge the next day, although most of the residents of Weatherfield are unaware of Phelan's role in Luke's murder — with the exception of Phelan's enemy Gary Windass (Mikey North), whom Luke had befriended during his time in Weatherfield, and former apprentice Seb Franklin (Harry Visinoni). Eventually, the truth was out when Gary and Seb sought to uncover the gun Phelan used to kill Luke — only to end up uncovering Andy's body along with that of Phelan's ex-business partner, Vinny Ashford (Ian Kelsey); after hearing of this, Eileen realised that Seb was telling the truth about Luke and Phelan confesses to Luke's murder in the midst of emulating his crimes. The following morning, Tim told the Nazirs about Phelan killing Luke when news of his crimes became public knowledge. Luke's death would later be avenged when Phelan was murdered by his archenemy — Gary's mother Anna Windass (Debbie Rush) — at the conclusion of his lethal siege, during which he shot Michelle Connor (Kym Marsh) — who in retaliation and in Luke's honor promised Phelan that she would say his murder was self-defence.

== Michael Rodwell ==
Michael Rodwell
- Coronation Street character
- Portrayed by: Les Dennis
- Duration: 2014–2016
- First appearance: Episode 8349; 24 March 2014
- Last appearance: Episode 9039; 21 November 2016
- Introduced by: Stuart Blackburn
In-universe information
- Other names: Intruder
- Occupation: Switch operator Ice cream man
- Father: Keith Rodwell
- Wife: Susan Meldrum (backstory); Gail McIntyre (2015–2016)
- Sons: Gavin Rodwell
- Stepsons: Nick Tilsley; David Platt
- Stepdaughters: Sarah Platt
- Grandfathers: Edward Rodwell
- Aunts: Barbara Deakin
- First cousins: Robert Rodwell

Michael Rodwell (credited as "Intruder" in his first appearance), played by former Family Fortunes presenter Les Dennis, made his first screen appearance on 24 March 2014. The character and Dennis' casting were announced on 23 January 2014. Dennis began filming for the show on 27 January. Michael has been billed as a "petty criminal". His arrival saw him break into one of the street's households. Of his casting Dennis stated "I'm so thrilled to be joining the cast of Coronation Street. It has always been my favourite television programme. Mixing high drama with some of the best comedy on screen." Producer Stuart Blackburn described securing the established television personality a "real coup" for the show. On 19 July 2016, it was announced that Dennis would be leaving the show later in the year to pursue other projects and that "Michael will have a dramatic exit". In August 2017, Dennis was longlisted for Best Exit at the Inside Soap Awards. The nomination did not progress to the viewer-voted shortlist.

Michael first appears in Gail McIntyre's (Helen Worth) house, pretending to be a gas man, who has come to the house to look at the "gas leak". He is revealed as a burglar and pushes Gail, causing her to fall over and her daughter-in-law Kylie Platt (Paula Lane) chases him out of the street, but he gets into his van and drives off, with Fiz Stape (Jennie McAlpine) failing to read his number plate as he drives away. Gail starts to become anxious when she is home alone due to the burglary and is helped by her son David Platt (Jack P. Shepherd), Kylie and mother Audrey Roberts (Sue Nicholls). Weeks later, Gail visits Michael in prison to ask him about why he tried to burgle her house. They gradually grow close and she begins to stick up for him in front of David and Kylie. Michael gets a job at a local garden centre, until he is sacked after Kylie and David interfere with his work by telling the garden centre manager about Michael's criminal past. Although the manager knew this, he still sacks Michael after Kylie causes a scene. The next day, Gail takes Michael to StreetCars and helps him get a job there, after he somewhat impresses Eileen Grimshaw (Sue Cleaver) and Steve McDonald (Simon Gregson). He is due to start work the next day, but David and Gail's eldest son Nick Tilsley (Ben Price) go to his flat and threaten him and tell him not to come back to Weatherfield and attempt to contact their mother ever again or go to work at Street Cars. Gail asks after him at the cab office, and co-owner Lloyd Mullaney (Craig Charles) tells her that Michael didn't turn up. Not knowing why Michael didn't turn up, Gail then visits the flat and demands that Michael apologise to Lloyd and Steve for letting them down. Reluctantly, he lies and says that working so close to her would be too much for him, as he has feelings for her. Gail then leaves the flat, sad that Michael feels that way. The day after, Nick accidentally lets slip that he knows where Michael is living, and Gail visits Michael again. Michael admits that Nick and David threatened him, and agrees to go to work the next morning, while Gail promises to sort her sons out. Steve then agrees to give Michael another chance. To show his gratitude towards Gail, Michael buys the Platts a new television, after Kylie's young son Max Turner (Harry McDermott) destroyed their last one. He tells Gail that the TV cost £200, but when David later looks up the price on the internet, it says that it costs £420. David then tries to convince Gail that Michael stole money in order to buy the television, but Gail will not listen to him. Michael then produces the receipt, proving he did buy the television, and also shows them a solicitors letter to prove where he got the money, after he received it from a deceased aunt's estate. David remains sceptical, but his suspicions are soon eclipsed by his much greater concerns about his sworn enemy: Max's biological father Callum Logan (Sean Ward).

When Michael is sent a photo album of his son Gavin's (Mark Holgate), childhood by Gavin's mother and his ex-wife, Susan Meldrum (Meriel Scholfield), Gail tries to stop him from looking at the photo with help from Gavin's friend Andy Carver (Oliver Farnworth) - who is impersonating Gavin; however, they fail in this and Michael soon realizes that Andy isn't the real Gavin. Gail tells him that his real son has died in a car accident followed by a Heart Attack . Hurt and upset, Michael leaves Gail and temporarily lives at Eileen's house, much to the dismay of Gail, until a drunken kiss from Michael to Eileen leaves him collapsing and taken to hospital. Despite trying to keep their relationship a secret from Gail, Michael soon confesses leading to a fight on the street between Eileen and Gail. Unable to forgive Gail for keeping Andy and his son's death a secret, he later demands a divorce. Michael and Eileen later split up, and she begins a relationship with local builder Pat Phelan (Connor McIntyre). After a short absence from the street, Michael returns in July and reconciles with Gail.

In mid-November, Michael learns that Phelan - whom he had been clashing with ever since he knew that Phelan had been wooing Eileen in an attempt to steal her from him - and his crooked business partner Vinny Ashford (Ian Kelsey) have been scamming the residents of Weatherfield over the last few months. On the day Eileen accepts Phelan's proposal, Michael seeks the help from Gail's neighbour Anna Windass (Debbie Rush) - who too resents Phelan; back when Michael first appeared on the street in 2014, Phelan raped Anna by blackmailing her into sleeping with him - which she reluctantly agreed to do in order to prevent Phelan for tormenting her son Gary Windass (Mikey North) and ex-boyfriend Owen Armstrong (Ian Puleston-Davies) during their disastrous business partnership. Anna initially refuses to help Michael as she wants nothing to do with Phelan, but later discovers the scam herself after unwittingly seizing Phelan's phone from her adoptive daughter Faye Windass (Ellie Leach). Working together against their shared enemy, Anna invites Phelan to her house to stall him so that Michael could infiltrate his office to obtain evidence against him. While Anna tries unsuccessfully to bribe Phelan in leaving Weatherfield, Michael heads down to the site office and extracts Phelan's fake passport for his getaway escape. Just as Michael is about to leave with the evidence, however, Phelan arrives at the last second with a crowbar. Michael tauntingly dismisses Phelan's theory that he could phone the police to have him arrested for breaking and entering, as Michael has already gotten proof that Phelan's "Calcutta Street" project is actually a scam, but the situation quickly grows tense when Phelan makes it clear to Michael that he now intents to kill him. After failing to persuade Phelan in giving himself up to the police, Michael throws a chair at him to escape. He makes a break for the exit just as Phelan gives chase, but Michael suddenly stops and ends up having another heart attack in front of Phelan - who coldly refuses to help him as he did once before. Meanwhile, Anna alerts her Gary of the situation and he heads down to confront Phelan, but does not notice a dying Michael succumbing to his heart attack and taking his last breath. Gail attempts to ring him, but it's too late - as Michael has died. Once all is settled, Phelan later finds Michael dead and silently bids him goodbye with a sign of the cross before walking away from his lifeless body. Eileen's son Todd Grimshaw (Bruno Langley) discovers Michael's body the following day. Michael is cremated off screen, and Gail scatters his ashes into a pond near to where they were planning to renew their vows.

As time went on without Michael following his passing, Andy correctly suspected Phelan's role in his death and tried in vain to expose this – but was consequently abducted and locked in a cellar of Phelan and Eileen's would-be new home for nearly the entirety of 2017; this ultimately ended with Phelan killing Andy after forcing him to execute Vinny, whom Andy – in his last moments – was manipulated into believing was responsible for Michael's death, not Phelan. In March 2018, just two months after Phelan had killed Andy's best friend Luke Britton (Dean Fagan) for gradually uncovering the true circumstances of the latter's "disappearance" – thus preventing Luke from having the possibility of finding out the truth about both Michael and Vinny as well – Eileen would learn that Michael was right about Phelan's involvement in his "Calcutta Street" flats scam development upon overhearing his confession during his argument with Michael's best-friend and co-worker: Tim Metcalfe (Joe Duttine) – who himself, along with Anna and Gary, had correctly suspected Phelan's role in Michael's death. A few weeks later, the truth was eventually revealed when Gary and his sister's boyfriend Seb Franklin (Harry Visinoni) had unknowingly unearthed the bodies of Andy and Vinny during their attempt to uncover the gun that Phelan used to kill Luke. When Eileen discovers this and confronts Phelan in response, he confessed to watching Michael die of a heart attack - before going on to emulate the rest of his crimes. The following morning, Gail and her family were informed about Phelan causing Michael's death by the time his crimes became public knowledge in Weatherfield. Michael's death would soon be avenged when Phelan is killed by Anna at the conclusion of his lethal siege, during which he shot his own daughter Nicola Rubinstein (Nicola Thorp) and her neighbor Michelle Connor (Kym Marsh) - prior to the latter marrying her fiancé and co-restaurant owner Robert Preston (Tristan Gemmill). Ironically, Phelan dies in the same way as Michael had died - with Anna and the rest of the street watching Phelan die without aiding him, more likely in retribution for Michael's death.

== Neil Beckett ==
Neil Beckett
- Coronation Street character
- Portrayed by: William Travis
- First appearance: Episode 8409; 16 June 2014
- Last appearance: Episode 8480; 29 September 2014
- Introduced by: Stuart Blackburn
In-universe information
- Wife: Andrea Beckett (until 2014)
- Daughters: Jessica Beckett

Neil Beckett, played by William Travis, appeared between 16 June and 29 September. Neil is Andrea Beckett's (Hayley Tamaddon) husband, who she has not told anyone about, including her boyfriend Lloyd Mullaney (Craig Charles). When Neil discovers the truth, Andrea leaves him for Lloyd and he tries to win her back.

Neil returns home after three months working on his engineering job in Nigeria with presents for Andrea. Behind his back, she looks torn. Andrea tells Neil she has to go into work to cover for absent staff, even though he wants her to spend the day with him. Neil tells her he's postponed his return to Nigeria so they can spend more time together and suggests they visit their daughter Jess in Liverpool. Andrea makes her excuses and leaves him alone. Andrea arrives home to a cooked meal from Neil but makes her excuses to go to bed early and avoid him. Taking a breather outside The Rovers Return Inn, Andrea is startled when Neil arrives unannounced to join her. She manages to walk him away off home before Lloyd comes out, puzzled as to where she has got to. Andrea plucks up her courage and tells Neil she's leaving him but doesn't tell him about Lloyd.

Steve is stunned to hear that Andrea is married. Michelle Connor (Kym Marsh) tells him that Andrea's gone to tell Neil that it's over between them and, if she doesn't, Steve McDonald (Simon Gregson) will have to tell Lloyd himself. As Andrea prepares to leave, Neil asks her to wait and talk some more. Lloyd and Steve arrive at Andrea's address – only to find it isn't: she gave Lloyd a false address. Steve tells Lloyd what he's just found out himself about Andrea's marriage. Lloyd at first refuses to believe him but the truth finally gets through. He returns to his flat and, after a moment, Andrea turns up, complete with her bags. Lloyd throws her out after she lied to him.

As Andrea packs the last of her things, Neil begs her to give him another chance but her mind is made up. Andrea turns up in the Street and begs Steve to listen to her side of the story. She breaks down and Steve hugs her, watched from a distance by Neil who has followed her. He then follows Steve into The Rovers and listens in to him talking about the StreetCars business. Steve picks up a fare – it is Neil. Neil doesn't tell Steve who he is. He unnerves Steve with his responses at attempts at conversation. Neil quizzes Steve about his private life. Steve loses his temper and asks him to leave the cab. Neil does so, making a passing comment about "friendly" cabbies. Lloyd refuses to talk to Andrea when she accosts him in the street. Again, Steve comforts her and she grabs onto his words of comfort as an offer to spend the night in The Rovers as she has nowhere else to go. Neil watches them talking together. Neil makes enquiries of Owen Armstrong (Ian Puleston-Davies) and Gary Windass (Mikey North) if Steve is married. Andrea finds Neil in the ginnel who says he knows she has another man. He enters The Rovers through the back door and to Andrea's horror, confronts Steve, accusing him of having an affair with his wife. Lloyd steps forward and explains to Neil that he's the "other man", not Steve. Lloyd explains to Neil that Andrea has been lying to both of them and he never wants to see her again. He also makes it clear to Steve that he's not happy that he has given Andrea shelter. Neil turns up at the locked cab office but Steve sees him off and enters with his own key. Neil tries to get into the back of the pub to see Andrea but Eva Price (Catherine Tyldesley) tells him she's gone out.

Neil tells Lloyd that Andrea has gone missing and no one has heard from her. Neil approaches Andrea and Lloyd in the street and begs Andrea to give him another chance but she says no. Neil approaches Andrea again and begs for a talk. Neil tells Andrea he has a new contract for a year in the Philippines starting the next week and he wants her to come with him. She rushes off without giving an answer. Neil bombards Andrea with text messages saying he's in The Rovers and wants to talk. Jenna Kamara (Krissi Bohn) storms out and Lloyd, Jenna's father, decides to meet Neil himself. Lloyd is taken aback by Neil's genial demeanour.

Lloyd and Andrea are pleased as Neil will have left the country by now. They're stunned when he walks into The Rovers and tells Andrea he let the plane go without him to have another go at talking her round. Lloyd is livid when she agrees to hear him out. Neil tells Andrea he'll do anything to make her happy. Lloyd worries he'll get through to her. Neil accepts defeat and takes Andrea for one last drink. Andrea is dismayed when her drink with Neil turns into yet another attempt to talk her round, as he reminds her of happier times. Lloyd wonders where Neil and Andrea are. Andrea spells it out to Neil that she hasn't loved him for ages and is running out of pity for him. Lloyd marches into the Bistro to send Neil packing. Andrea is annoyed when he causes a scene but relieved when Neil leaves. Andrea is creeped out when she sees Neil hanging around outside Lloyd's flat. Lloyd tries to see him off but Neil announces his intention to remain day and night until Andrea changes her mind. Steve and Lloyd are puzzled when StreetCars receives fake call-outs and a load of pizzas they didn't order. Neil casually lets them know he's behind it. Neil pesters Andrea with texts. Steve suggests Lloyd play Neil at his own game. Steve and Lloyd observe from afar as a clown they've ordered calls at Neil's house for a non-existent child's party. They're surprised when Neil invites him in. Neil tells Steve and Lloyd their plan backfired as he and the clown are kindred spirits. He passes on a message to Andrea that her mother is in hospital.

Lloyd and Andrea decide to have a picnic in The Rovers' yard. Neil watches them from his car. Neil interrupts Lloyd and Andrea's picnic and settles down with a pint to watch them. Andrea is furious when she hears from him about Lloyd sending the clown round. Andrea is concerned as neither she nor Neil have heard from their daughter Jess who was due back from Cambodia the previous day. Neil comes to see Andrea but is told to leave her alone. Lloyd is furious to see a notice in the Gazette placed by Neil celebrating his and Andrea's anniversary. Steve lets slip to Neil that Lloyd and Andrea are at the bistro. Neil takes a table next to Lloyd and Andrea at the Bistro. From the adjoining table, Neil chats constantly to Lloyd and Andrea and even buys them all champagne. Lloyd can't take Neil's presence anymore and offers to take him outside but Andrea calms him down. Andrea tells Neil she wants a divorce. Neil begs Andrea not to divorce him. She's worried he'll do something to himself and decides to check on him but Lloyd insists on going instead in case it's a ploy to talk her round. Lloyd lets himself into Neil's house and finds him in a chirpy mood, clearly expecting Andrea.

Lloyd notices Neil has set candles and wine and threatens to call the police if he bothers Andrea again. The police call at Lloyd's flat and bring him in for questioning as Neil has accused him of harassment. Lloyd is aggrieved when the police tell him to stay away from Neil. Neil appears to taunt Lloyd and Andrea and tells them he's going to make sure they're never happy together. Lloyd and Andrea are annoyed to see Neil in the café. Andrea tries a different tactic – being nice to him, and Lloyd joins in. Neil tells Andrea he knows what she's doing but it won't work – he's going to be her shadow until she sees the error of her ways.

Lloyd chats to Michelle about her wedding planning service and asks her hypothetically what services she would provide for him and Andrea. Neil overhears them and thinks they are actual plans. He walks out of The Rovers and sees the ladder outside No. 4. Neil pinches the ladder and climbs up on to the roof of The Rovers. Tim Metcalfe (Joe Duttine) is stuck on the roof of No. 4 and tries to alert his girlfriend Sally Webster (Sally Dynevor), who is happily watching television inside. Lloyd and Dev Alahan (Jimmi Harkishin) see the two men and Tim yells at them to bring the ladders back to him. Steve's mother Liz McDonald (Beverley Callard) comes out and stops them being moved before Neil comes down off her roof. Andrea comes back from work and sees what's going on. Neil refuses to come down until the engagement is broken. He doesn't believe their excuses. Neil refuses to come down until Andrea comes back to him. She climbs up the ladder to talk to him and tells him she's never coming home. Andrea slips and Liz tells Lloyd and Dev to get Andrea in through the window but they can't get her into position to pull her in. Neil tells her to trust him and manages to pull her on to the roof. Neil is upset that he almost lost Andrea but he accepts now she loves Lloyd. The police and fire brigade arrive to rescue Andrea and Neil. He asks her to remember him as he once was, when they were happy. They are brought down and Lloyd goes for Neil who is taken away by the police as Kevin Webster (Michael Le Vell) and Kal Nazir (Jimi Mistry) get Tim down. Lloyd is confident he and Andrea have seen the last of Neil, but he turns up to say the police have let him off with a caution and he's leaving the country for good. Neil tells Lloyd and Andrea he's seen the light and is truly sorry. Lloyd is so eager to get rid of him that he drives him to the airport free of charge.

== Alya Nazir ==
Alya Nazir
- Coronation Street character
- Portrayed by: Sair Khan
- Duration: 2014–present
- First appearance: Episode 8412; 25 June 2014
- Introduced by: Stuart Blackburn
In-universe information
- Occupation: Receptionist; Trainee Factory Manager; Businesswoman; Lawyer
- Father: Kal Nazir
- Mother: Jamila Nazir
- Brothers: Zeedan Nazir
- Grandfathers: Sharif Nazir
- Grandmothers: Yasmeen Nazir
- Uncles: Idris Nazir

Alya Nazir, played by Sair Khan, made her first appearance on 25 June 2014. The character and casting was announced on 1 April 2014. Of her casting, Khan said "I'm absolutely thrilled to be joining the cast of Coronation Street. As a northerner, I've grown up watching the show and so can't quite believe that I'll soon be walking on the famous cobbles." Alya is the daughter of Kal Nazir (Jimi Mistry) and her arrival coincides with that of her brother and grandmother. The Nazirs are the show's first Muslim family. Alya was described as being "strong-minded" by the show's assistant producer Ella Kelly. She added that Alya would tempt one of the show's male characters and cause "a storm before her feet have even hit the cobbles". Alya is a university graduate, who makes things difficult for her father with her "outspoken nature and bubbly personality".

During a night out in a club with her friend, Siobhan (Jessica Forrest), Alya meets Gary Windass (Mikey North) and Jason Grimshaw (Ryan Thomas). Gary and Alya get on well and flirt, although Jason decides to go home. Siobhan later leaves, and Alya and Gary share a kiss on the dance floor. The next morning, Gary wakes up with Alya and suspects he has cheated on his girlfriend, Izzy Armstrong (Cherylee Houston), though he cannot remember anything. While he is at the gym, Gary learns Alya is Kal's daughter when they are introduced to each other. Alya is angry when she realises he has a family. However, she later reveals to Gary that they never had sex. When Alya discovers that Gary and Izzy have split up, she believes it is because Izzy found out about Gary and Alya's kiss, although when Alya tries to explain herself to Izzy, Izzy is furious to discover that Gary cheated on her. Alya then worries that Izzy will tell Kal about her kiss with Gary. Upon moving onto the street Alya gets a job at knicker factory Underworld and in January 2015 the minibus she is travelling in to an awards ceremony with the rest of the staff crashes, Alya manages to escape before the minibus falls down a cliff.

After her father Kal dies in the Victoria Court Fire in May 2015, Alya goes on a downward spiral into a rebellious phase where she dumps Gary and takes her sorrows out on alcohol, leading to her sleeping with Jason which results in Alya losing her virginity and going against her religious morals, leaving her plagued with guilt. Gary later proposes. Alya becomes worried she is pregnant from her fling with Jason but is relieved when a test comes back negative. Alya and Gary break up when Alya eventually tells him about the one night stand.

In July 2016, Yasmeen's friend Sonia Rahman (Sudha Bhuchar) comes to stay with the family, but Alya finds out she is having an affair with Sharif and starts to blackmail Sharif to give her money or she will tell Yasmeen about the affair. She manages to gain £15,000 and buys a new sewing machine at work, leading to all of the other workers wondering where she got the money to buy it.

In October 2016, Alya blackmails Sharif after discovering his secret 7-year affair. This was then found out in November 2016 when Yasmeen decided to play nice with Sharif before having Zeedan and Rana's engagement party and revealing his infidelity in front of shocked family and friends. After ushering the guests away Yasmeen has it out with him and he reveals that Alya blackmailed him. After an argument, Yasmeen told both Sharif and Alya to pack their bags and leave, although later forgives her.

She later starts sharing a flat with Kate Connor (Faye Brookes) and Luke Britton (Dean Fagan) which leads to her starting a relationship with Luke. At the end of 2017, she goes into business partnership with Aidan Connor (Shayne Ward) after Underworld is closed and learns some of their new clients are racist but decides to let them deal with them anyway, the deal later ends when Luke punches them, for which he is arrested. A few days later, unbeknown to Alya at the time, Luke is killed in a car explosion caused by Pat Phelan (Connor McIntyre) after confronting him about Andy Carver's (Oliver Farnworth) disappearance. When Alya finds out about Luke’s death she is heartbroken and blames the racist clients for it. Underworld later reopens. She later finds out that Pat was behind it. In April 2018 she starts a relationship with Josh Tucker (Ryan Clayton), unaware he has recently raped David Platt (Jack P. Shepherd); however, they later break up, Josh tells Alya that he slept with David when they were drunk to cover his tracks that he in fact raped him, although the next day David's girlfriend Shona Ramsey (Julia Goulding) tells Alya that it was rape, leaving her unsure of what to believe.

At work Alya regularly gets into arguments with boss Carla Connor (Alison King) especially after Aidan commits suicide. Alya stands up for herself when Carla says she is spoilt and quits her job. Later on that day, Alya is told by solicitor and friend Imran Habeeb (Charlie De Melo) that she is the new owner of Underworld after he finds Aidan's will, making Alya realise why Carla wanted her out of the business. A feud follows between Alya and Carla over the business; however, she decides to sell the factory back to Carla when a video interview of Aidan comes to light which makes Alya realize how much the factory means to the Connor family and decides to help Zeedan with Speed Daal.

== Yasmeen Nazir ==
Yasmeen Nazir
- Coronation Street character
- Portrayed by: Shelley King
- Duration: 2014–2025
- First appearance: Episode 8418; 4 July 2014
- Last appearance: Episode 11,513/4; 10 March 2025
- Introduced by: Stuart Blackburn
In-universe information
- Other names: Yasmeen Metcalfe
- Occupation: Chief librarian Community Centre Manager; Waitress
- Husband: Sharif Nazir (until 2018); Geoff Metcalfe (2019–2020)
- Sons: Kal Nazir
- Stepsons: Tim Metcalfe; Idris Nazir
- Grandsons: Zeedan Nazir
- Granddaughters: Alya Nazir

Yasmeen Nazir (also Metcalfe), played by Shelley King, made her first on-screen appearance on 4 July 2014. The character and King's casting was announced on 15 May 2014. Yasmeen is established character Kal Nazir's (Jimi Mistry) mother and the wife of Sharif Nazir (Marc Anwar). The Nazirs are the show's first Muslim family. Yasmeen began featuring in a high-profile coercive control storyline from May 2019 onwards, involving her second husband Geoff Metcalfe (Ian Bartholomew). The storyline culminated in May 2020, when Geoff infected Yasmeen with chlamydia after sleeping with prostitutes, and she stabbed him in the throat with a broken glass bottle when he threatened her with a kitchen knife.

On 13 January 2025 it was announced that King had quit her role as Yasmeen after 11 years with her final scenes airing on 10 March 2025.

Yasmeen first appears talking to her son, Kal, in his gym. She then asks Kal and her husband Sharif about Kal's new girlfriend Leanne Battersby (Jane Danson). It is later revealed during a conversation with her granddaughter Alya (Sair Khan) that Yasmeen is a librarian. When Yasmeen and Leanne meet at Leanne's flat, they seem to get on well, but when Leanne's estranged husband Nick Tilsley (Ben Price) reveals to the Nazir family that she used to be a prostitute, Leanne runs indoors, with Yasmeen looking at Kal disappointedly. The next day, Yasmeen arrives at Leanne's flat again and meets her half-sister, Eva Price (Catherine Tyldesley). After witnessing Leanne shouting at Nick exclaiming that she also used to be a drug addict and an arsonist, Yasmeen tells Leanne to dump Kal for his sake, and a small argument ensues between the two women. Leanne then tells Yasmeen that she will never be as good as Kal's deceased wife, Jamilla, but Yasmeen replies by saying that nobody is perfect. When Leanne confides in Kal about Yasmeen's orders, he promises to tell her to back off.

A few weeks later, Yasmeen returns to Coronation Street with Sharif to discuss the Weatherfield Library closure with Roy Cropper (David Neilson) and Emily Bishop (Eileen Derbyshire). Emily reveals to an intrigued Yasmeen that she resorted to vandalism when she was at a protest many years before, and Yasmeen enlists the help of Roy to stop the library from closing down. As Yasmeen leaves, Sharif asks Roy to keep an eye on Yasmeen and not to let her get into trouble, as she was arrested for protesting many years ago.

Yasmeen, Roy, Emily, Mary Taylor (Patti Clare) and Craig Tinker (Colson Smith) eventually stage a sit-in protest at the library, but Emily, Mary and Craig end up leaving, although Yasmeen and Roy stay to continue the protest. Later, it is revealed that the library has burnt down, leaving Yasmeen saddened. She tries to tempt Roy into letting her use part of the café as a library, which he hesitantly agrees to. Yasmeen develops an obsession with turning Roy's café into a library, which eventually becomes too much for Roy. Thinking of other ways to run a library, Yasmeen buys Elliott & Sons butchers and tells Kal, Alya and grandson, Zeedan (Qasim Akhtar), that she is intending to turn it into a community centre.

In 2018, Yasmeen meets Geoff Metcalfe (Ian Bartholomew) and marries him in 2019. However, things take a dark turn when Geoff begins to abuse Yasmeen and isolate her from friends and family. He also tricks her into eating one of her pet chickens, Charlotte Bronte.

In May 2020, Geoff's abuse becomes too much for Yasmeen, and she stabbed him in the neck with a broken bottle after he threatens her with a knife. A horrified Yasmeen phones emergency services, and claims that she had killed Geoff. He wakes up in hospital and confirms that Yasmeen had tried to kill him. Yasmeen is then charged with his attempted murder.

In December 2020, Yasmeen's trial begins. Geoff paints her as a violent alcoholic and that she attacked him unprovoked. When Yasmeen gives her side of the story, the prosecution tears her defence to pieces. Geoff's ex-wife Elaine Jones (Paula Wilcox) gives evidence and says that she believes that Yasmeen was fearing for her life when she attacked Geoff. She also claims that Geoff visited her in hospital and that he threatened her into not giving evidence. Footage of Geoff arriving at the hospital is shown, and the jury finds Yasmeen not guilty. Outside the court, Geoff persuades Yasmeen to give him another chance and to return home with him, only for her to refuse, and file a complaint against him to the police.

Geoff later tries to get revenge on Yasmeen by setting her house on fire with them both inside. Yasmeen escapes through the roof and Geoff chases her up. They are soon joined by Alya, who tries to stop Geoff from harming Yasmeen, who then stands up to Geoff, saying that she is no longer scared of him and that he is a pathetic excuse for a man. Geoff lunges for Yasmeen, but instead slides down the roof. He calls for Yasmeen to help him, despite Alya's warnings that Geoff will pull her down with him. Yasmeen decides to help Geoff back up with her scarf, only for Geoff to lose his grip and fall to his death.

After Geoff's death, Yasmeen starts to recover from the abuse. However, she has a severe panic attack and is taken to hospital after finding out that Geoff had taken out loans in her name. To help Yasmeen recover, Elaine briefly moves in with her, and her debts are cleared when the bank agree to repossess the community centre. She also formed a friendship with former homeless man Stu Carpenter (Bill Fellows) and even invites him to move in with her. She later finds out that he is a convicted murderer.

== Dr. Susan Gaddas ==
Dr. Susan Gaddas
- Coronation Street character
- Portrayed by: Christine Mackie
- Duration: 2014–present
- First appearance: Episode 8440; 4 August 2014
- Introduced by: Stuart Blackburn
In-universe information
- Other names: Susan Gaddas
- Occupation: General practitioner

Dr. Susan Gaddas, played by Christine Mackie, made her first screen appearance on 4 August 2014. She appears on a recurring basis, treating several residents as a general practitioner operating from the Rosamund Street Medical Centre.

Dr. Gaddas is first seen examining Max Turner (Harry McDermott) after he is brought in by his mother Kylie Platt (Paula Lane) and stepfather David Platt (Jack P. Shepherd), when his behaviour undergoes a sudden deterioration. Kylie goes on sufferance, unwilling to admit that there could be anything wrong with Max. David was more reasonable, saying that Max was constantly in trouble at school and home. Kylie asks if Max's difficult start in life could be the cause but Dr. Gaddas suggests his condition as being ADHD. She assures Kylie and David that it is not a serious condition and that she would be referring him to a child psychiatrist with the future treatment being either medical or behavioural. A few days later, Beth Tinker (Lisa George) visits Dr. Gaddas when she comes out in an allergic rash after trying out one of her niece Sinead Tinker's (Katie McGlynn) bathbombs. Beth's fiancé, Kirk Sutherland (Andrew Whyment), rushes into Dr. Gaddas' room upon arrival while she is conducting an examination of another patient who is partially-clothed at the time. When she comes to see Beth, she diagnoses hives, recommends she avoids non-scented bath products in the future and prescribes her some antihistamine tablets. She assures an anxious Kirk that Beth will live, after realising how panic-stricken he was about Beth.

The following month, Kylie returns to see Dr. Gaddas to ask for a re-supply of the medication that Max had been diagnosed with for his ADHD. She tells Dr. Gaddas that she has accidentally thrown one strip of the tablets away and Dr. Gaddas replaces the lost items. In reality, Kylie has been taking the tablets herself, unable to cope with the strain of Max's ADHD. Michael Rodwell (Les Dennis) is later seen visiting Dr. Gaddas when he begins to suffer with heart problems. He is eventually diagnosed with a genetic heart condition, which led to him having open-heart surgery. Steve McDonald (Simon Gregson), deep into a bout of untreated depression visits the surgery with great reluctance. He had previously seen a locum, Dr. Robinson, who had suspected his condition and when Steve sees that he is not behind the desk, he suffers a panic attack. Dr. Gaddas calms him down and takes him through a questionnaire, with confirms Dr. Robinson's diagnosis of depression. Like Dr. Robinson, Dr. Gaddas tells Steve he should see a counsellor or talk to someone to unburden himself. Steve gives his mother, Liz (Beverley Callard) as a possible person to do this with. When Dr. Gaddas sees Steve in the street at the end of the day, he confirms that he had taken no action and she warns him that he has to deal with his depression or it will only worsen.

Anna Windass (Debbie Rush) takes her adoptive daughter Faye (Ellie Leach) to see Dr. Gaddas when she is concerned about Faye's high temperature. Dr. Gaddas gives a prescription for paracetamol but Faye flees the surgery when Anna starts to talk about her eating problems. Dr. Gaddas states that her weight seems to be in the normal range but, not having conducted a full examination, she is unaware that a 13-year-old Faye is in fact six months pregnant. Dr. Gaddas then sees Kylie who has returned to Weatherfield after going missing for six months, attempting successfully to wean herself off drugs. Kylie wants proof for her suspicious family that she is now clean and requests a drugs test. Dr. Gaddas tells Kylie that such a test is not proof of permanent abstinence but she gives her leaflets which suggest ways to remain clean and tells her to get the support from the people around her as she will not be able to succeed on her own. Hope Stape visits Dr. Gaddas with her mother Fiz Stape (Jennie McAlpine) and stepfather Tyrone Dobbs (Alan Halsall) after she falls ill on holiday. Dr. Gaddas refers her to a paediatrician as she detects a lump in her abdomen when she was examining her. She tells Fiz and Tyrone that she has booked an immediate ultrasound scan for Hope, who is later diagnosed with a type of childhood cancer called neuroblastoma.

Leanne Battersby (Jane Danson) has a consultation with Dr. Gaddas after suffering from back pain. Prescribing her with strong painkillers to be taken with food, Dr. Gaddas confirms that Leanne has no history of asthma, stomach complaints and that there is no possibility that she could be pregnant. Although Leanne returns home with the medication, the pregnancy testing kit she also bought, indicates a positive reading. Dr. Gaddas is consulted by Mary Taylor (Patti Clare), after she finds a lump on the side of her breast and fears she may have breast cancer. While Dr. Gaddas said that Mary has nothing to be worried about, Mary is skeptical, and so Dr. Gaddas decides to refer Mary to an ultrasound scan as a precaution.

== Dean Upton ==
Dean Upton
- Coronation Street character
- Portrayed by: Justin Moorhouse
- First appearance: Episode 8456; 25 August 2014
- Last appearance: Episode 8465; 7 September 2014
- Introduced by: Stuart Blackburn
In-universe information
- Occupation: Pub landlord

Dean Upton, played by Justin Moorhouse, made his first screen appearance on 25 August 2014. The character and Moorhouse's casting was announced on 19 June 2014. Of joining the show, Moorhouse commented "I'm delighted to be treading the cobbles. It's always been a dream of mine to appear in the Rovers Return, even though as Dean, the landlord of the Flying Horse, I feel like a spy!" Dean is the landlord of the Flying Horse public house, which is the rival to The Rovers Return Inn. Dean went to war with the Rovers' landlord Steve McDonald (Simon Gregson) during a match of cricket. After the match Dean loses to Steve leaving Dean agitated.

== Zeedan Nazir ==
Zeedan Nazir
- Coronation Street character
- Portrayed by: Qasim Akhtar
- Duration: 2014–2018, 2021–2023
- First appearance: Episode 8463; 5 September 2014
- Last appearance: Episode 10882; 20 February 2023
- Introduced by: Stuart Blackburn (2014); Ian MacLeod (2021)
In-universe information
- Occupation: Gym manager Chef; Businessman
- Father: Kal Nazir
- Mother: Jamila Nazir
- Sisters: Alya Nazir
- Wife: Rana Habeeb (2016–2018); Marrium Nazir (2020–present)
- Grandfathers: Sharif Nazir
- Grandmothers: Yasmeen Nazir
- Uncles: Idris Nazir

Zeedan Nazir, played by Qasim Akhtar, made his first screen appearance on 5 September 2014. The character and casting was announced on 15 May 2014. Zeedan is the teenage son of established character Kal Nazir (Jimi Mistry). The Nazirs formed the show's first Muslim family. Three years after his exit from the soap, Coronation Street announced that Akhtar would be reprising his role as Zeedan from September 2021. Upon his arrival, he is shocked to learn that Alya is in financial trouble and offers to bail her out. She is suspicious about his riches and her suspicions are heightened when Zeedan is attacked by thugs on the street. On his return, Akhtar commented: "I'm excited to be back and getting stuck into an explosive storyline that I feel the viewers are going to love. Zeedan's found himself in trouble yet again and I hope everyone tunes in to see madness unfold!" Echoing Akhtar's excitement at Zeedan's return, executive producer Ian MacLeod stated that his return would be beneficial for the Nazirs and that it would provide good material for them. MacLeod also felt that Zeedan has "tonnes of connections" on the soap, which would aid his return.

Zeedan's sister, Alya (Sair Khan), persuades him to come along to support their father in a cricket match between the Rovers Return Inn and The Flying Horse. Zeedan becomes angry when he sees his father's new girlfriend, Leanne Battersby (Jane Danson), there and voices his disapproval. Eventually, Zeedan comes round to the idea of Leanne's presence and accepts his father's relationship with her. He also forms a close friendship with Leanne's stepson, Simon Barlow (Alex Bain). After Kal is killed in the fire at Victoria Court, Zeedan initially blames Leanne for his death, but later supports her when she grieves over her loss. Zeedan begins to notice something strange about Simon's behaviour, as well as his attitude towards stepmother Leanne. Zeedan notices Leanne's leg is bleeding, unbeknownst to him that Simon caused the injury and Leanne says that she caught her leg on the dishwasher door. After finding out about Simon's abuse towards Leanne, Zeedan moves in temporarily to help Leanne with Simon. The abuse eventually comes to light after Simon attacks his cousin, Amy Barlow (Elle Mulvaney), and Zeedan is pleased to hear that Simon is attending counselling. Zeedan gives up his job at the gym when he realises he cannot cope with the responsibility as gym manager. He later gets a job as a chef at the Bistro, but later leaves to start up a restaurant selling Pakistani street food named Speed Daal. Zeedan left Weatherfield for London on 23 May 2018. In 2020, Zeedan marries Marrium Elamin (Kiran Landa) off-screen in a low-key wedding in Alicante.

In 2021, Zeedan returns to the street and immediately bumps heads with Ryan Connor (Ryan Prescott) for cheating on Alya and tempers fray when he insults Ryan's adoptive brother, Ali Neeson (James Burrows), bringing up his drug addiction and Ryan fires back about Zeedan being away in London while Geoff Metcalfe (Ian Bartholomew) abused his grandmother, Yasmeen (Shelley King). He also argues with Alya who defends Ryan and turns down his offer of a loan to bail the restaurant. Later, Zeedan is followed and attacked by two unknown assailants in an alley. Further problems arise when the police interview Ryan who denies being at the scene. Zeedan reveals to Alya and that he has left Marrium and her father Hashim (Vincent Ebrahim) is angry and made some threats to kill him. Zeedan tells them the two men that beat him were his brothers-in-law.

In February 2023, Zeedan departed Coronation Street to be with his estranged wife Marrium. Laura-Jayne Tyler from Inside Soap criticised the exit, writing, "Zeedan didn't just leave Corrie in the back of a taxi, but the back of a taxi through a window. Thanks for popping in!".

== Gemma Winter ==
Gemma Winter
- Coronation Street character
- Portrayed by: Dolly-Rose Campbell
- Duration: 2014–present
- First appearance: Episode 8481; 1 October 2014
- Introduced by: Stuart Blackburn
In-universe information
- Other names: Gemini Winter; Gemma Winter-Brown
- Occupation: Drug dealer Catering assistant Barmaid
- Father: Denny Foreman
- Mother: Bernie Winter
- Stepfather: Dev Alahan
- Brothers: Paul Foreman
- Half-brothers: Kit Green
- Husband: Chesney Brown (2023–present)
- Sons: Aled Winter-Brown; Bryn Winter-Brown
- Daughters: Carys Winter-Brown; Llio Winter-Brown
- Stepsons: Joseph Brown
- Nephews: Brody Michaelis

Gemini "Gemma" Winter (also Winter-Brown), played by Dolly-Rose Campbell, made her first on-screen appearance on 1 October 2014. She originally appeared from October 2014 to September 2015 as a recurring character before returning on a permanent basis from 11 March 2016. In June 2017, Campbell won the British Soap Award for Best Comedy Performance. In August, she was longlisted for Funniest Female at the Inside Soap Awards. She later made the viewer-voted shortlist, and won the award on 6 November 2017.

Gemma is an old friend of Kylie Platt (Paula Lane). They are reunited when Kylie returns to the Eccleston estate where they grew up. Gemma is also close friends with drug dealer Callum Logan (Sean Ward) and terrorises the Platt family with him. After leaving her family, Kylie briefly stays with Gemma, before she returns home. Callum and Gemma befriend Sarah Platt's (Tina O'Brien) teenage daughter Bethany (Lucy Fallon), and she starts spending time with them at The Dog & Gun pub. Gemma and Callum pressure Bethany into smoking cannabis and, Callum gets Bethany to sell drugs for him. While Sarah is at Callum's flat, Gemma turns up with her face bloodied and battered. She claims that she and Callum are in trouble. After Callum attacks Jason Grimshaw (Ryan Thomas), he and Gemma hatch a plan to stop the Platts from reporting him to the police. Gemma drives Bethany away from the street and shows her a video call from Callum, who has drugged Sarah. He tells Bethany to give him an alibi or he will hurt Sarah. Gemma then drives Bethany to the police station. Callum's plan is successful, and he is released from police custody. Gemma later disagrees with Callum over his plans to leave the country. Callum then receives a text from Kylie saying she has the £20,000 he wants and he tells Gemma to get out of his car. Gemma arrives at the Platt household the following week asking where Callum is, and with Sarah's obvious upset, Gemma notices something is wrong. However, Kylie texts Gemma from Callum's mobile phone saying that he is going to keep a low profile for a while as people are after him, which ultimately prompts Gemma to leave.

Gemma returns a few months later at the salon, stating that she has quit drug dealing and is wanting a job as a salon assistant. Kylie and her husband David Platt (Jack P. Shepherd) decide to hire her to get her to talk about Callum to convince people that he is still alive. Satisfied that she's talked about him enough they fire her from her new job the following day. She later goes to the kebab shop and meets Chesney Brown (Sam Aston). When she sticks up for Chesney after some men complain, she asks Chesney for a job at the kebab shop. She meets his boss Dev Alahan (Jimmi Harkishin) and he offers her a job, which she accepts. After she spends the night with Jason, he is cold towards her as it is his father Tony Stewart's (Terence Maynard) funeral. When she comes back round Eileen Grimshaw (Sue Cleaver) tells her that she is sorry for the way Jason treated her and decides to go to the funeral after Gemma tells her that she was in love with Callum; but he wouldn't look twice at her but still cares for him.

In July 2016, Gemma is attacked in the kebab shop by fifteen-year-old thug Clayton Hibbs (Callum Harrison), who pushes her to the ground and knocks her unconscious. Kylie intervenes to save Gemma but she is fatally stabbed in the chest by Clayton. Kylie later dies in David's arms before an ambulance arrives. Gemma later prevents Norris Cole (Malcolm Hebden) being conned by Donna-Marie, a girl who Gemma recognises from her estate as a known con artist. After giving evidence at Clayton's, trial she becomes homeless as she is too scared to return home so Rita Tanner (Barbara Knox) lets her move in with her, which irritates Jenny Bradley (Sally Ann Matthews). After Rita begins to lose her memory, Gemma tries to prove that she has dementia to Jenny, but this causes a public argument in The Rovers and Rita being hospitalised after collapsing. In hospital, Gemma is present when Rita is diagnosed with a brain tumour, and told that she needs an operation to remove it, where the doctors will be able to identify whether the tumour is cancerous.

In April 2024, it was announced that Danny Cunningham had joined the cast of Coronation Street as Gemma's father Denny Foreman. He made his first appearance on 29 April 2024.

== Macca Hibbs ==
Macca Hibbs
- Coronation Street character
- Portrayed by: Gareth Berliner
- Duration: 2014–2017, 2019
- First appearance: Episode 8482; 3 October 2014
- Last appearance: Episode 9702; 25 February 2019
- Introduced by: Stuart Blackburn
In-universe information
- Occupation: Drug dealer
- Stepfather: Dane Hibbs

Cormac "Macca" Hibbs, played by Gareth Berliner, made his first on-screen appearance on 3 October 2014. Macca is an old friend of Kylie Platt (Paula Lane), Gemma Winter (Dolly-Rose Campbell) and Callum Logan (Sean Ward).

When Kylie left home during Christmas 2014, David Platt (Jack P. Shepherd) asks Macca where Callum lived. Macca pointed him in the direction, which leads David to Callum, who later arrives at the flat with a heavy to confront David. Sometime later, in April 2015, David attempts to use Andy Carver (Oliver Farnworth) to plant some drugs in Callum's car. After a failed attempt, Callum, Gemma and Macca beat David with a baseball bat.

In June 2016, Macca learns from Gemma that Callum has been murdered and his body had been found under the Platt family's house. Prior to the funeral, Macca tells Kylie and David they better not attend the funeral or they will regret it. At the funeral, Macca serves as one of the pallbearers. For the next few weeks, Macca and his stepbrother Clayton (Callum Harrison) harass Gemma at the kebab shop, demanding free kebabs. Although Gemma refuses, the situation comes to a head in July, when Clayton knocks Gemma unconscious, and stabs Kylie to death.

In August 2016, Macca attempts to force Gemma to retract her statement against Clayton when pinning her against the wall of the ginnel. Craig Tinker (Colson Smith) comes to her assistance, forcing Macca to flee. Several months later, Macca is rendered comatose as the result of a brick being thrown through his window following Clayton's arrest. David is accused and is warned by police that he could go down for murder if Macca dies. Even after a witness admits to the crime, David visits Macca in hospital under the pretence of being his cousin and tries to kill him by smothering him but is foiled by the presence of a nurse. Following his recovery, Macca attends Clayton's trial and when his stepbrother is sentenced to 15 years to life in prison, he yells that the verdict is a disgrace and vows to get Clayton out of prison. When Macca's stepfather, Dane, dies in February 2019, he attends the funeral and ultimately helps Clayton escape by disguising himself as an undertaker and attacking the prison guards with a shovel. Macca is then arrested.

== Callum Logan ==
Callum Logan
- Coronation Street character
- Portrayed by: Sean Ward
- Duration: 2014–2015
- First appearance: Episode 8482; 3 October 2014
- Last appearance: Episode 8740; 23 September 2015
- Introduced by: Stuart Blackburn
In-universe information
- Occupation: Drug dealer
- Mother: Marion Logan
- Sons: Max Turner; Harry Platt

Callum Logan, played by Sean Ward, made his first screen appearance on 3 October 2014. The character and casting was announced on 14 August 2014. Of his casting, Ward said "I am delighted to have been given this unique opportunity to join such a brilliant and much-loved show. It is a great honour and it will be a professional challenge to play bad boy Callum. I'm very much looking forward to working closely with Paula."

Callum is Kylie Platt's (Paula Lane) ex-boyfriend and Max Turner's (Harry McDermott, Paddy Bever) biological father. Kylie seeks Callum out after Max's ADHD diagnosis, as she believes it must be either his "fault" or her own. Callum is an ex-convict and is described as being charming and "good-looking", but with a "dark edge". Ward was nominated for "Best Newcomer" and "Villain of the Year" at The British Soap Awards 2015; however, he lost out on both.

During a live episode Sarah Platt (Tina O'Brien) invites Callum over, hoping to get a confession of his crimes but this backfires when he finds her recording the conversation and takes her hostage. After Callum threatens her, she tries to make a run for it but Callum pins her down and attempts to rape her but is stopped by Kylie who hits him over the head with a spanner, killing him instantly . Kylie's husband and Sarah's brother, David Platt (Jack P. Shepherd) comes home and wanting to protect Kylie and Sarah, buries Callum beneath what will be Gail's new "granny annex"; which was still being renovated. In December 2015, Sarah finds out she is four months pregnant with Callum's baby, just over a month after his death. Sarah contemplated having an abortion, but following a discussion with Kylie at the clinic, Sarah decides to keep the baby. Harry Platt, was born in March 2016 after Sarah went into labour five weeks early.

== Andy Carver ==
Andy Carver
- Coronation Street character
- Portrayed by: Oliver Farnworth
- Duration: 2014–2017
- First appearance: Episode 8517; 21 November 2014
- Last appearance: Episode 9286; 27 October 2017
- Introduced by: Stuart Blackburn (2014); Kate Oates (2017)
In-universe information
- Other names: Gavin Rodwell
- Occupation: Waiter

Andy Carver (briefly known as Gavin Rodwell), played by Oliver Farnworth, made his first screen appearance on 21 November 2014. The character and casting was announced on 14 August 2014. Of joining the show, Farnworth stated "I'm absolutely delighted to be joining the cast of Coronation Street. Having spent my childhood in the North, to be given the opportunity to return and work on such an iconic, popular TV show is a dream and feels like a natural homecoming. I can't wait to tread the cobbles!" Farnworth left the role in 2016, and Andy departed on 20 January 2017, after presumably being murdered by Pat Phelan (Connor McIntyre). However, he made a surprise return seven months later on 18 August 2017, where it was revealed that Phelan has been holding him hostage in the basement of a house he was supposedly "working on". He was killed by Phelan for real on 27 October 2017. In August 2017, Andy's return was longlisted for Best Shock Twist at the Inside Soap Awards. The nomination progressed to the viewer-voted shortlist. On 6 November 2017, Farnworth won the "Best Shock Twist" accolade.

When Michael Rodwell (Les Dennis) tries to track down his estranged family via Facebook, a cousin of his gets in touch and tells him his father has died. Michael's paternal aunt Barbara Deakin (Beatrice Kelly) then visits him to explain that his father and her mother both died of a hereditary heart condition, meaning Michael could also be a carrier. A worried Michael tests positive for the condition and realises he has to find his long-lost son Gavin, as he is also potentially at risk. Michael finds an address for Gavin and leaves a note with his address and telephone number. "Gavin" contacts him and the two have an uneasy reunion. However, when Michael reveals the news about his heart condition, the man claiming to be Gavin is seen making a phone call, stating that he needs to find Gavin Rodwell urgently.

The imposter, who is really Andy Carver manages to find some casual work at Nick's Bistro, owned by Nick Tilsley (Ben Price), the eldest son of Michael's girlfriend Gail McIntyre (Helen Worth). He asks for cash in hand, claiming his bank account has been frozen due to fraud, in order to continue hiding his identity. Steph Britton (Tisha Merry), who worked as a waitress there, becomes attracted to Andy; while he initially steers clear to avoid his lie going too far, Andy eventually asks her out. Meanwhile, Andy begins to genuinely like Michael and starts to feel more and more guilty. He continues to attempt to trace the real Gavin Rodwell, but has no luck. When Nick's estranged wife Leanne Battersby (Jane Danson) returns to her old job as Manager of the Bistro, she insists Andy is properly paid through the books, forcing him to steal Gavin's National Insurance number and to open a bank account in his name. However, when Steph unexpectedly visits Andy she catches him in the act. Andy confesses the truth to a horrified Steph, but manages to persuade her not to expose him, convincing her Michael's health would be at risk from such a shock. When Michael sees the two behaving oddly and overhears part of a conversation, he jumps to the conclusion that she is pregnant. Realising that it is a sensible explanation for their behaviour, Andy tells Michael its true, but later told an enthusiastic Michael (who was looking forward to becoming a grandad, and even went as far as buying a t-shirt saying "top grandad" and baby clothes) that it was a false alarm.

When Steph visits Andy at his flat, she is surprised to find a man she doesn't know there, before realising that it must be the real Gavin. She warns Andy to hide any evidence of what he's done, but before he can, Gavin finds a bank statement for an account in his name with regular payments from Nick's Bistro. Andy initially claims he used Gavin's name to avoid his wages being swallowed up by his overdraft, but Gavin is unconvinced, and Andy eventually admits the truth, begging Gavin to keep quiet due to Michael's health. Gavin, still bitter about being abandoned by his father, has no interest in sparing his feelings, but offers to stay quiet for £5,000. A desperate Andy and Steph fake a mugging when Andy is entrusted with banking the Bistro's takings, but it isn't enough, so Gavin carries out his threat to expose Andy, by visiting Gail on her wedding day. The drama leads a stunned Gail to miss the wedding and, when she later furiously confronts Andy and Steph, she reveals Gavin is now blackmailing her. Gail reluctantly pays Gavin off and agrees to keep Andy's secret to avoid upsetting Michael.

Much to Andy's relief, Gavin plans to leave the UK with his money. However, Andy is stunned to receive a phone call the next day telling him that Gavin has been killed in a car crash, apparently drunk behind the wheel. When Gail hears the news she tells Andy they have to keep it from Michael, telling him that to all intents and purposes, he now IS Gavin in Michael's eyes. However, the deception proves too much for Gail, especially after Barbara visits, having heard of Gavin's death, and reveals Gavin actually died of a heart attack. Gail attends Gavin's funeral in Michael's place, claiming he is too ill to go himself, but her guilt leads her to frequently visit Gavin's grave – something her younger son David Platt (Jack P. Shepherd) later discovers. When Gail tells him the truth, he uses this information to blackmail Andy, forcing him to plant drugs on his enemy Callum Logan (Sean Ward). Andy gets caught, but David takes the rap. However, the stress is too much for Steph, who ends their relationship. Steph's brother Luke Britton (Dean Fagan) is furious to see her upset and threatens to confront Andy, leading Steph to tell Luke the truth. When Luke next sees Andy he confronts him anyway, but Steph persuades him to keep the secret.

At Gail and Michael's rescheduled wedding, Andy makes a heartfelt speech about how close he has grown to Michael and how pleased he is to see him happy. Steph hears something in his words that makes her think it is a goodbye speech, her suspicions later proving true when she goes to Andy's flat and finds him packed his things and ready to leave. However, he tells Steph he cannot bear to leave her. Andy's secret comes out when Michael receives a photo album from his ex-wife, containing photos of the real Gavin. Michael eventually forgives him and they form a close surrogate father-son relationship, and Andy is left heartbroken when Michael dies of a heart attack whilst being watched by Pat Phelan (Connor McIntyre); whose property development scam Michael was investigating. Suspecting Phelan's involvement, an irate Andy strikes Phelan over the head with a brick, putting him in a coma. While he is recovering in hospital, Andy tries to poison Phelan's drink. Once Phelan realises this, he punishes Andy by blackmailing him into stealing money from the Bistro and burning down Kevin Webster's (Michael Le Vell) garage. Unable to withstand Phelan's blackmail any longer, Andy and Steph plan to flee Weatherfield for Portugal on Phelan's wedding day to Eileen Grimshaw (Sue Cleaver). When Phelan visits Andy to bid him farewell shortly after Steph leaves early, Andy records Phelan confessing to being present at Michael's death. Phelan realises this and hits Andy with the laptop containing incriminating evidence of Phelan confessing to his crimes. Phelan later sends a text to Steph from Andy's mobile phone and tells her that their relationship is over, so Steph leaves the country alone And Takes Him Hostage In The Abandoned House Phelan keeps Andy chained to a wall in the basement of an abandoned house. Desperate to be freed, Andy comes up with a plan to get a replacement for him, which he would keep hostage, meaning he would earn his freedom and although initially reluctant, Phelan gets his former business partner Vinny Ashford (Ian Kelsey) for Andy to keep hostage. However, Phelan changes his mind and tells Andy to kill Vinny instead. He drives them both to an abandoned building and manipulates Andy into shooting Vinny dead. Andy aims the gun at Phelan, but then gives it to him. Andy realises that Phelan is going to kill him too, and – rather than fight Phelan – accepts his fate before Phelan pulls the trigger. Phelan apologises to Andy for killing him, before dumping his body along with Vinny's, into a lake. Phelan confesses to Eileen that he abducted and killed Andy. He is later killed by Anna Windass (Debbie Rush).

== Billy Mayhew ==
Billy Mayhew
- Coronation Street character
- Portrayed by: Daniel Brocklebank
- Duration: 2014–2026
- First appearance: Episode 8527; 5 December 2014
- Last appearance: Corriedale; 5 January 2026
- Introduced by: Stuart Blackburn
- Crossover appearances: Corriedale (2026)
In-universe information
- Occupation: Vicar; Archdeacon
- Father: Fred Mayhew
- Mother: Sandra Mayhew
- Brothers: Lee Mayhew
- Husband: Paul Foreman (2023–2024)
- Adoptive daughters: Summer Spellman

Billy Mayhew, played by Daniel Brocklebank, made his first screen appearance on 5 December 2014.

The character and Brocklebank's casting was announced on 24 September 2014. He began filming in October. Billy is a vicar and will be introduced as a love interest for Sean Tully (Antony Cotton). Series producer Stuart Blackburn commented on the storyline, saying "It's about time Sean had a romance, he's been unlucky in love for a long time. Billy is a great guy who is sincere about his feelings for Sean, but his first love is and always will be God and the Church." A reporter writing for the Inside Soap Yearbook 2017 described Billy's kiss with Todd Grimshaw (Bruno Langley) as "x-rated" and noted that "many viewers complained". In August 2017, Brocklebank and Langley were longlisted for Best Partnership at the Inside Soap Awards. They did not progress to the viewer-voted shortlist.

Sean and his colleague Sinead Tinker (Katie McGlynn) are about to head home after an uneventful evening at a club when suddenly Sinead makes Sean talk to a man he spots in the club. Billy Mayhew, the man in the club, tells Sean he's just moved to Weatherfield from Peterborough. Billy tells Sean that he's the new vicar at St. Mary's Church. They swap numbers. Sean tells his friend Eileen that he has a new man. Emily Bishop (Eileen Derbyshire) introduces Sean and Eileen Grimshaw (Sue Cleaver) to the new vicar, Billy. Sean and Billy don't let on that they know each other. Sean is nervous as he goes for a date with Billy at the bistro. Billy puts him at ease and they arrange a proper night out together. Sean's desperate to make a good impression as Billy arrives at No.11. Billy enjoys his meal. Sean frets over what to say to Billy's text of thanks.

Beth Tinker's (Lisa George) hen night gets underway at The Rovers Return Inn. Beth mistakes Billy for a stripper. Sean invites Billy to the wedding as his plus one. Sean has given up on Billy when he arrives, having been held up at work. Billy texts Sean and tells him about Eileen calling him. Sean does not mind her interfering but tells her to be out when Billy comes over. Billy shows concern for Sean and tells him he has feelings for him. Billy calls early on Sean for their date before he's dressed and ready. Eileen's son, Todd, is jealous as Sean and Billy go on their date. Sean and Billy enjoy their date in The Rovers but it is cut short when Billy is called away to visit a parishioner in trouble. Sean gets uptight as a date with Billy nears. Sean and Billy join Jason Grimshaw (Ryan Thomas) and Eva Price (Catherine Tyldesley) for her birthday dinner in the bistro. Sean is expecting Billy for dinner and is out to impress him with his food. The guests have all arrived for Sean's posh home-cooked dinner for Billy, but Eva is late.

Billy asks Emily for help in hosting a comedy night at the church to raise funds. She appears uncomfortable with the idea and with him and Sean being together. Billy has flyers distributed for the church comedy night. Emily is coldly polite with him and Sean wonders if she disapproves of the two of them together. Sean does his best to drum up interest in the comedy night, promising an unenthusiastic Billy that he'll be there. Sean is worried about his and Billy's coming-out together at the comedy night. Billy steels himself and explains to Sean that as he's still very much the new vicar, he does not yet want his congregation to know that he's gay. Sean is hurt and decides not to go along. Sean takes his temper out on Emily, calling her a bigot for not supporting Billy, just as the man himself walks in. Emily's shocked and assures Sean she is neither a bigot nor a homophobe but just a traditionalist when it comes to how her faith is practiced and merely prefers a choir to a comedy night. Moreover, Billy's private life is entirely his own affair. Realising he misjudged the situation, Sean offers an embarrassed apology. Billy is furious with him. Todd is secretly pleased. Billy takes Sean to task for attacking an old lady and leaves for the comedy night without him. Billy buries the hatchet with Emily. Sean wants to make up with Billy but doesn't do anything about it as he thinks he's blown his chances. Emily lures Billy to The Rovers on the pretext of asking him to help a parishioner before telling him and Sean to get over themselves. Sean and Billy struggle to sort out their differences as Sean refuses to be kept in a box. Sean decides to keep his relationship with Billy a secret if it's the only way of keeping him. Sean puts up posters for Billy's charity butler auction. Sean and Billy compete to recruit volunteer butlers for the auction. Kevin agrees to be in the auction and tells Billy to put Tyrone down as well. Sean and Billy make arrangements for The Rovers to be decorated for the butler auction but neither Liz McDonald (Beverley Callard) nor Michelle Connor (Kym Marsh) are impressed with the list of Kevin Webster (Michael Le Vell), Tyrone Dobbs (Alan Halsall), Kal Nazir (Jimi Mistry), Sharif Nazir (Marc Anwar) and Sean himself as the men to bid for. The night is a success, though.

Sean and Billy prepare for a day's ramble in the Peak District. Worn out after a long walk, Sean and Billy find a country pub where they book a room for the night. Making out there's been a double-booking, the landlord tells Sean and Billy there's no longer a room available. Billy and Sean confront the pub landlord, accusing him of fabricating the double-booking to disguise his homophobia. The landlord orders them to leave. Sean and Billy return to Weatherfield and arrive back at No.11, telling Eileen and Adrian what happened. Billy tells Sean how proud he was of him in the pub and how annoyed he was that he was hurt by the landlord. Billy sets out to see Lucy, a sick child of his parish. Weatherfield Gazette reporter Naila Badal calls on a horrified Sean and asks details of the landlord and his own relationship with Billy. Billy arrives back saying that Lucy has died. Sean forgets his anger as he comforts him. Eileen hears about Lucy's death and gives Sean and Billy some space. Billy confesses to Sean that he's falling in love with him.

A furious Billy calls round with the Gazette which carries the front-page story of his and Sean's run-in with the pub landlord. He's furious as he meets his new Bishop for the first time today and he who has very conservative views on homosexuality. Sean is forced to admit that Julie was responsible. Billy is furious. Billy and Sean show Julie the story. Mortified, she apologises. Billy is tense before his meeting. Eileen tells Sean that Billy's congregation will support him. Billy comes back from his meeting with the Bishop. He's upset as he explains to Sean that the Bishop made his disapproval of the publicity plain and in desperation Billy lied to him, assuring him that he and Sean have ended their relationship. Sean is devastated.

Billy says he would rather stay in than go to the bistro. Sean's disappointed, realising he's worried about being seen together. Sean rustles up a meal for Billy but his disappointment is evident. Todd and Jason interrupt Billy and Sean's evening. Todd enjoys ruining Billy and Sean's evening. Billy apologises to Sean and assures him he's not ashamed of their relationship. Sean's nervous about attending Billy's church Bring and Buy sale and has got Eileen to agree to go to it with Adrian. Julie accompanies Sean to the sale, posing with him as a couple. Billy is amused. Sean is pleased when Billy asks him to organise the raffle tickets at the sale. Sean meets Bishop Redmond at the sale and starts to gabble in a panic until Billy sends him away. Julie Carp (Katy Cavanagh) takes Billy to task for upsetting Sean. He calls on Sean and explains how he's told the Bishop he cannot live a lie – that Sean is his boyfriend and that he has to accept it. Sean is touched. Billy invites Sean back to the vicarage for the night. The Windasses and Hodges arrive in church for Miley Windass' christening, with Billy performing the ceremony. Billy tells the Barlows he'll be conducting Deirdre Barlow's (Anne Kirkbride) funeral and asks them what kind of service Deirdre would want. Sean and Billy tell Kylie (Paula Lane), David (Jack P. Shepherd) and Sarah Platt (Tina O'Brien) that Jason might be brain damaged after being ruthlessly attacked by Callum Logan (Sean Ward).

Todd overhears Sean and Billy discussing Jason's condition and how he might need a kidney transplant. Kevin's party gets underway with Sally Webster (Sally Dynevor), Sophie Webster (Brooke Vincent), Tim Metcalfe (Joe Duttine), Kirk Sutherland (Andrew Whyment), Andrea Beckett (Hayley Tamaddon), Sean, Lloyd Mullaney (Craig Charles), Gail Rodwell (Helen Worth), Rita Tanner (Barbara Knox), Steve McDonald (Simon Gregson) and Billy in attendance. Lloyd and Andrea leave in a classic American 1950s car, organised by Luke Britton (Dean Fagan) and decorated with balloons by Sean and Billy.

Sean and Billy break up and Billy begins a relationship with Todd Grimshaw which upsets Sean. They adopt Billy's ex-boyfriend's daughter, Summer Spellman (Matilda Freeman/Harriet Bibby). In late 2017, Billy goes to court with Peter Barlow (Chris Gascoyne) and is stabbed outside after breaking up a fight. Fearing he is on his deathbed, Billy confessed to Peter he was behind the death of his sister, Susan Barlow (Joanna Foster), in 2001. Peter hates Billy for this and kidnaps him at Christmas, putting him on the edge of a cliff, which Billy ends up falling off, he survives but starts taking drugs to cope with his pain, taking heroin in a church with his drug addict brother, Lee. Billy goes missing but after, Summer finds him, he goes to rehab and later moves back onto the street.

== Diane Mellor ==
Diane Mellor
- Coronation Street character
- Portrayed by: Julia Montgomery Brown
- First appearance: Episode 8526; 5 December 2014
- Last appearance: Episode 8528; 7 December 2014
- Introduced by: Stuart Blackburn
In-universe information
- Husband: Robin Mellor (backstory)

Diane Mellor, played by Julia Montgomery Brown, is Kevin Webster's (Michael Le Vell) new love interest from Hale Barns. Robin Mellor's American wife, Diane, turns up at the garage, looking for her sofa. Diane tells Kevin that Robin sold the sofa out of spite in their bitter divorce. Clearly smitten by her, Kevin tells her he sold the sofa to a random guy named "Barney" in The Rovers Return Inn. Diane insists they go for a drink to see if they can find him. Jason Grimshaw (Ryan Thomas) almost gives the game away about the sofa in front of Diane. She leaves and Kevin promises to call her if he finds "Barney". Kevin is pleased when Diane texts him, wanting to meet him in The Rovers again that night but tells Tim Metcalfe (Joe Duttine) he's worried about the risk of someone saying something. Diane meets Kevin. He suggests they go to the Weatherfield Arms instead as he knows that "Barney" won't be in The Rovers but she would rather try the bistro instead. Diane and Kevin enjoy each other's company at the bistro. He confesses his past affair with Molly Dobbs (Vicky Binns). Kevin's horrified when his ex-wife Sally (Sally Dynevor) and Tim turn up at the bistro and Diane asks them to join their table. Sally's instantly impressed with Diane and wonders how she and Kevin met. He quickly changes the subject. Sally covers for Tim's employment when Diane makes enquiries about it and spends the night trying to show off to her. When Sally suggests Diane come back to her house for a nightcap, Tim and Kevin desperately cover, using a wasp sting as the best excuse they can think of. Diane nips to the ladies' and Tim and Kevin have a chance to tell Sally that she's the sofa's owner. Feeling guilty, Sally has no choice but to join in the deception or lose the sofa. Diane agrees to go back to Kevin's for a coffee. Sally wonders what a classy lady like Diane sees in Kevin and rues the fact that she can't invite her back to her house. Tim tells her she'll have to choose what to give up; a friendship with Diane or the sofa. Diane meets Jack and promises to see a pleased Kevin again. Owen Armstrong (Ian Puleston-Davies) drops Kevin in it by telling Diane about Kevin giving Sally his new sofa. Diane meets Kevin for lunch at the bistro, and tries to get him to come clean about the sofa. He keeps up the Barney cover story, saying Barney has gone out of town. Kevin is worried when Diane insists on dropping in on Sally. He tries to stop her but she barges in regardless and sees the sofa. Kevin tries to convince her the sofa doesn't matter, but she demands they return it tomorrow or she'll sue. Sally is offended by her stipulation that they put a cover over it in the meantime.

== Erica Holroyd ==
Erica Holroyd
- Coronation Street character
- Portrayed by: Claire King
- Duration: 2014–2017
- First appearance: Episode 8532; 15 December 2014
- Last appearance: Episode 9223; 4 August 2017
- Introduced by: Stuart Blackburn
In-universe information
- Occupation: Spanish barmaid (backstory); Barmaid (2015–); Shop assistant (2016–2017); Waitress (2017)
- Brothers: Lee Holroyd

Erica Holroyd, played by Claire King, made her first screen appearance on 15 December 2014. The character and casting was announced on 23 September 2014. Of joining the show, King said "I am beyond thrilled to be joining the cast of Coronation Street playing the funny and feisty Erica, who looks certain to ruffle a few feathers once her high heels hit those world famous cobbles!" Erica comes to Coronation Street to visit her old friend Liz McDonald (Beverley Callard). While she was on the Street, Erica had a brief relationship with Nick Tilsley (Ben Price). Her departure from the show was announced in May 2017, and she departed on 4 August 2017.

Erica comes to Coronation Street to see her friend, Liz, who agrees that she can stay with her for a few weeks over Christmas. Gail McIntyre (Helen Worth) catches an impatient Erica helping herself to a drink at the Bistro, leaving the money on the bar. Gail orders her son and the Bistro's owner, Nick Tilsley (Ben Price), to throw Erica out, but he refuses. Erica offers to take over Gail's duties and Nick is impressed by her customer service. Erica gives Nick her phone number. Erica flirts with Nick and she invites him back to The Rovers, where they have sex. Erica later learns that Nick is a changed man since he met her. Erica confides in Liz that she only ever wanted a holiday fling with Nick and she is worried that he expects more. As she prepares to leave, Erica learns from Leanne Battersby (Jane Danson) that Nick feels the same as her and only wanted a fling. Erica pays Liz an unexpected visit in March, much to the annoyance of Gail, whose hen party is taking place at The Rovers.

Erica returns in May 2015 and tells Nick that she is pregnant with his child. This causes a dilemma for Nick, who is trying to impress Carla Connor (Alison King). Nick tells Erica that he will stand by her and the baby, which delights her. She rekindles her fling with Nick, although is aware of his chemistry with Carla. She confides in Liz on numerous occasions that she feels having a baby at 50 years of age is very risky, but Liz reassures her. When Nick throws her a birthday party for her 50th birthday, Erica is upset and humiliated, especially as Carla is present. During a pub quiz, Erica doubles over in pain and is taken to hospital by Liz and Nick. Later, Erica and Nick are devastated to learn that she has miscarried the baby. Despite holding strong feelings for Carla, Nick stands by Erica and even invites her to move in with him, but after he has sex with Carla, she realises that she is always going to be second best, so leaves Nick. Erica is later seen in The Rovers with Liz and Lloyd Mullaney (Craig Charles), where the trio talk about their failed love lives.

Erica later accepts a job at the local corner shop, unaware that the manager Dev Alahan (Jimmi Harkishin), has developed a crush on her. She later helps Izzy Armstrong (Cherylee Houston) to get cannabis for pain relief. She then starts a relationship with Dev and befriends his children's nanny, Mary Taylor (Patti Clare). When Erica books a spa weekend away for her and Dev, her mother falls ill and she offers for Mary to go instead, leading to Dev and Mary getting drunk and waking up in the same bed. A guilt-ridden Dev confesses to Erica, but Mary reveals they only "slept together" in a literal sense, and that nothing sexual happened between them. Dev later asks Erica to move in with him. After initially worrying it is too fast and will be disrupting for Dev's children, Aadi (Zennon Ditchett) and Asha (Tanisha Gorey), Erica agrees and moves in. However, Aadi and Asha do their best to make Erica's life difficult, and she struggles to bond with them in the way Mary has. Mary helps Erica adapt to being part of the Alahan family, and she eventually gets one over on Aadi and Asha after discovering they stole flowers for Mary from a graveyard. After Erica convinces them the police are involved, Aadi and Asha learn to respect Erica when she reveals she has tricked them.

== Others ==
| Character | Date(s) | Actor | Circumstances |
|---|---|---|---|
| Fran Heath | 3 February | Suzanne Procter | Fran is Maddie Heath's (Amy James-Kelly) mother. |
| Ben Heath | 3 February, 2 May, 12 June 2015 | Charlie Concannon | Ben is Maddie Heath's (Amy James-Kelly) younger brother. He attends Maddie's funeral on 12 June 2015. |
| Siobhan Davies | 25 June | Jessica Forrest | Siobhan and her friend Alya Nazir (Sair Khan) meet Jason Grimshaw (Ryan Thomas) and Gary Windass (Mikey North) in a club. Siobhan and Jason leave the club separately, leaving Alya and Gary alone together. |
| Eugene Clelland | 21 July–3 November | Fine Time Fontayne | Clelland is Peter Barlow's (Chris Gascoyne) prison cellmate. |
| Barbara Deakin | 19 September, 20 March 2015 | Beatrice Kelly | Barbara is Michael Rodwell's (Les Dennis) aunt. She tells him that her mother died young and so did Michael's father both from a heart condition. |
