= Dolly-Rose Campbell =

English actress

- Born: 12 April 1987 (age 38); Salford, Greater Manchester, England
- Occupation: Actress
- Years active: 2010–present
- Known for: Role of Gemma Winter in Coronation Street

Dolly-Rose Campbell (born 12 April 1987) is an English actress, who has played Gemma Winter on the ITV soap opera Coronation Street since 2014. The most famous of her storylines was Gemma giving birth to quadruplets.

== Personal life ==
In 2019, Campbell came out as bisexual.

== Filmography ==
Year	Title	Role	Notes
2010	Doctors	Sasha Dyson	Episode: "24-7"
2010	2 Pints of Lager		
2014–present	Coronation Street	Gemma Winter	Regular role

=== Guest appearances ===
- Lorraine (2016, 2019)
- Hilda Ogden's Last Ta Ra - A Tribute to Jean Alexander (2016)
- Granada Reports (2018, 2019)
- Good Morning Britain (2019)

== Awards and nominations ==
Year	Award	Category	Result	Ref.
2016	Digital Spy Reader Awards	Biggest Unsung Hero	Fourth	
2017	The British Soap Awards	Best Comedy Performance	Won	
2017	Inside Soap Awards	Funniest Female	Won	
2018	Inside Soap Awards	Funniest Female	Won	
2019	TV Choice Awards	Best Soap Actress	Nominated	
2020	TV Choice Awards	Best Soap Actress	Shortlisted	
2020	Inside Soap Awards	Best Partnership (shared with Sam Aston)	Shortlisted	
