= Sair Khan =

British actress (born 1988)

- Born: 11 February 1988 (age 38); Leeds, West Yorkshire, England
- Occupation: Actress
- Years active: 2010–present
- Known for: Coronation Street (2014–)
- Children: 1

Sair Khan (born 11 February 1988) is an English actress. She is known for her role as Alya Nazir in the ITV soap opera Coronation Street (2014–). In 2018, she competed in the ITV reality series I'm a Celebrity...Get Me Out of Here!.

== Early life ==
Khan was born to Pakistani immigrants from Mirpur, Azad Kashmir in Leeds, West Yorkshire on 11 February 1988. She is of Pakistani descent. Khan joined the National Youth Theatre at age 17.

== Career ==
Khan made her television debut in a one-off part as receptionist Nina Chopra in BBC medical soap opera Doctors in 2011. In June 2014, Khan made her first appearance as Alya Nazir in the ITV soap opera Coronation Street. She has remained a regular character on the show ever since. Khan received a nomination for Best Newcomer at the National Television Awards in 2015. On 12 November 2018, Khan was confirmed to be participating in the eighteenth series of I'm a Celebrity...Get Me Out of Here!. Khan was the third celebrity to be voted out on 3 December 2018.

== Personal life ==
In 2019, Khan split from her boyfriend Simon Lennon.

On 13 December 2023, Khan announced via social media that she was pregnant with her first child with boyfriend Nathan Chilton and in April 2024 the couple welcomed their first child, a boy.

== Filmography ==
Year	Title	Role	Notes
2011	Doctors	Nina Chopra	Episode: "No Regrets"
2014–present	Coronation Street	Alya Nazir	Series regular
2018	I'm a Celebrity...Get Me Out of Here!	Herself	Contestant; 9th place
2019	Celebrity Juice	Herself	1 episode
2019	Hey Tracey	Herself	1 episode
2019	Sink or Swim	Herself	Television special
2020	Rolling In It	Herself	Contestant

== Awards and nominations ==
Year	Award	Category	Result	Ref.
2015	20th National Television Awards	Newcomer	Nominated	
2015	Inside Soap Awards	Best Affair (shared with Ryan Thomas)	Nominated	
2023	2023 British Soap Awards	Best Leading Performer	Nominated	
2023	28th National Television Awards	Serial Drama Performance	Nominated	
