= Qasim Akhtar =

British Pakistani actor

- Born: 8 June 1991 (age 35); Burnage, Manchester
- Occupation: actor
- Years active: 2006–present
- Known for: Shameless; Coronation Street

Qasim Akhtar (born 8 June 1991) is an English actor, known for his roles as Chesney Karib in the Channel 4 comedy drama Shameless and Zeedan Nazir in the ITV soap opera Coronation Street.

== Early life ==
Akhtar was born and raised in Burnage, Manchester to a British Pakistani family. Since childhood, Akhtar had an interest in acting. He trained at the Manchester School of Acting.

== Career ==
Prior to making his breakthrough appearance in Shameless, Akhtar had his first acting experience through the 2006-released Mischief Night, written and directed by Penny Woolcock, and in the film, he stars as Asif Khan.

Akhtar gained prominence through his role as Chesney Karib in Shameless, appearing in 85 episodes between 2007 and 2013. This was followed by two different roles in Waterloo Road: Aron in 2007 and Wayne Bodley in 2011.

In 2014, Akhtar joined the cast of the long-running soap opera Coronation Street as Zeedan Nazir, a son of Kal Nazir (played by Jimi Mistry). Upon his first exit of the show in 2018, Akhtar began another stint within the show in 2021 but exited again in February 2023.

== Personal life ==
Akhtar was injured in a quad bike accident in 2018 and took up fitness. He leads a relatively private life but he has expressed his platform being used to discuss the state of representation of British Asian actors in television and film. In July 2026, he was awarded damages from the The Sun newspaper to settle a libel claim at the High Court of Justice.

== Accolades ==
He was nominated as Best Newcomer at the British Soap Awards for his work on the role of Zeedan Nazir in Coronation Street. The depiction of the complex characters from cultures similar to his has been applauded for bringing authenticity to the British TV.

== Filmography ==
| Year | Title | Role | Notes |
|---|---|---|---|
| 2006 | Mischief Night | Asif Khans | Movie |
| 2007–2013 | Shameless | Chesney Karib | Main role |
| 2007 | Waterloo Road | Aron | 1 episode |
| 2007 | How Life Happens | Qas | Short film |
| 2011 | Young Dracula | Vicious Vampire | 1 episode |
| 2011 | Waterloo Road | Wayne Bodley | 1 episode |
| 2012 | Doctors | Bhavin Hassan | 1 episode |
| 2014–2018, 2021–2023 | Coronation Street | Zeedan Nazir | Regular role |
