= List of Coronation Street characters introduced in 2015 =

Coronation Street is a British soap opera first broadcast on 9 December 1960. The following is a list of characters that appeared in 2015, by order of first appearance.

All characters are introduced by series producer Stuart Blackburn. Beth Tinker's (Lisa George) grandmother, Agnes Tinker (Juliette Kaplan), and Hamish Young (James Redmond), a potential love interest for Michelle Connor (Kym Marsh), were introduced in January, while Linda Hancock (Jacqueline Leonard), the estranged mother of Izzy (Cherylee Houston) and Katy Armstrong (Georgia May Foote), began appearing from February. Michael Rodwell's (Les Dennis) long-lost son, Gavin Rodwell (Mark Holgate), began appearing from March, as did Jackson Hodge (Rhys Cadman), the father of Faye Windass' (Ellie Leach) baby. Faye and Jackson's baby daughter Miley Windass (Erin, Eilah & Elsie Halliwell), Eileen Grimshaw's (Sue Cleaver) new love interest Adrian Mortimer (Mark Moraghan) and the first regular character of the year, Cathy Matthews (Melanie Hill), a love interest for widower Roy Cropper (David Neilson), began appearing from April. A love interest for Liz McDonald (Beverley Callard) and a face from Leanne Battersby's (Jane Danson) past, Dan Jones (Andrew Paul), and Robert Preston's (Tristan Gemmill) secret wife, Joni (Sarah Harding), made their debuts in June and July respectively. August saw the arrivals of wildlife explorer Dougie Ryan (Paddy McGuinness), and his daughter Caitlin Ryan (Eve Gordon), as well as an extension to the Connor family, Aidan Connor (Shayne Ward). Cathy's nephew, Alex Warner (Liam Bairstow), and Steph Britton's (Tisha Merry) ex-boyfriend, Jamie Bowman (James Atherton), arrived in September. October saw the arrivals of Aidan's father, Johnny Connor (Richard Hawley) and sister, Kate Connor (Faye Brookes), as well as Cathy's sister and Alex's mother, Nessa Warner (Sadie Shimmin). Caz Hammond (Rhea Bailey), Kate's fiancée, first appeared in November.

== Agnes Tinker ==
Agnes Tinker
- Coronation Street character
- Portrayed by: Juliette Kaplan
- First appearance: Episode 8548; 5 January 2015
- Last appearance: Episode 8581; 20 February 2015
- Introduced by: Stuart Blackburn
In-universe information
- Sons: Stan Tinker
- Daughters: Nancy Tinker
- Granddaughters: Arlene Tinker; Beth Sutherland
- Other relatives: Sinead Tinker; Craig Tinker; Bertie Osbourne

Agnes Tinker, played by former Last of the Summer Wine actress Juliette Kaplan, made her first screen appearance on 5 January 2015. The character and casting was announced on 21 December 2014. Kaplan was initially set to appear in four episodes, but this was later extended to eight.

Agnes is Beth Tinker's (Lisa George) grandmother, who comes to Weatherfield for her wedding to Kirk Sutherland (Andrew Whyment). She arrives with her daughter Nancy (Kate Fitzgerald) and her granddaughter Arlene (Alison Burrows). The women initially mistake Jason Grimshaw (Ryan Thomas) for Kirk and are disappointed when Kirk does eventually turn up. Agnes tells Arlene's daughter, Sinead (Katie McGlynn) that she will leave everything to her when she dies. Believing Kirk is not around, Agnes, Nancy and Arlene start making unkind remarks about him and his job. Beth and Kirk get married and Agnes leaves after the reception.

A few weeks later, Sinead is badly injured in a minibus crash and Agnes returns to the Street. She attempts to calm Chesney Brown (Sam Aston) down, after he is involved in a confrontation with Steve McDonald (Simon Gregson). Agnes visits Sinead and decides to stay for a while to help out. She tells Beth, Chesney and Kirk off for not pulling their weight when it becomes obvious that Sinead did most of the housework and cooking.

== Nancy Tinker ==
Nancy Tinker
- Coronation Street character
- Portrayed by: Kate Fitzgerald
- Duration: 2015, 2018–2019
- First appearance: Episode 8548; 5 January 2015
- Last appearance: Episode 9929; 18 November 2019
- Introduced by: Stuart Blackburn
In-universe information
- Mother: Agnes Tinker
- Brothers: Stan Tinker
- Daughters: Beth Sutherland; Arlene Tinker
- Grandsons: Craig Tinker
- Granddaughters: Sinead Tinker
- Other relatives: Bertie Osbourne

Nancy Tinker, played by Kate Fitzgerald, is Arlene (Alison Burrows) and Beth Tinker's (Lisa George) mother. The character and casting was announced on 21 December 2014. She arrives in Weatherfield for Beth and Kirk Sutherland's (Andrew Whyment) wedding in alongside Arlene and Agnes Tinker. The women initially mistake Jason Grimshaw (Ryan Thomas) for Kirk and are disappointed when Kirk does eventually turn up. Believing Kirk is not around, Agnes, Nancy and Arlene start making unkind remarks about him and his job. Beth and Kirk get married and during the party in The Rovers Return Inn, Nancy takes two bottles of wine and is caught by Liz McDonald (Beverley Callard).

She later returned for Sinead Tinker's wedding to Chesney Brown and was shocked when Chesney jilted her at the altar. The following year she attended Bertie Osbourne's christening and then visited Sinead on her deathbed.

== Arlene Tinker ==
Arlene Tinker
- Coronation Street character
- Portrayed by: Alison Burrows
- Duration: 2015, 2018–2019
- First appearance: Episode 8548; 5 January 2015
- Last appearance: Episode 9929; 18 November 2019
- Introduced by: Stuart Blackburn
In-universe information
- Mother: Nancy Tinker
- Half-sisters: Beth Sutherland
- Daughters: Sinead Tinker; Millie Tinker; Penny Tinker
- Grandsons: Bertie Osbourne
- Nephews: Craig Tinker

Arlene Tinker, played by Alison Burrows, is Beth Tinker's (Lisa George) sister and Sinead Tinker's (Katie McGlynn) mother. The character and casting was announced on 21 December 2014. Arlene comes to Beth and Kirk Sutherland's (Andrew Whyment) wedding. The night before the wedding, Kirk comes down the stairs to find Agnes (Juliette Kaplan), Arlene and Nancy (Kate Fitzgerald) insult him. In The Rovers Return Inn, Arlene flirts with Dev Alahan (Jimmi Harkishin), which makes Julie Carp (Katy Cavanagh) and Mary Taylor (Patti Clare) jealous.

Arlene returns for Sinead's wedding to Chesney Brown (Sam Aston), and her grandson Bertie Osbourne's christening, before visiting Sinead on her deathbed.

== Hamish Young ==
Hamish Young
- Coronation Street character
- Portrayed by: James Redmond
- First appearance: Episode 8547; 5 January 2015
- Last appearance: Episode 8560; 23 January 2015
- Introduced by: Stuart Blackburn

Hamish Young, played by James Redmond, made his first screen appearance on 5 January 2015. The character and casting was announced on 31 October 2014. Redmond was contracted for a three-week guest stint. Hamish was introduced as a love interest for Michelle Connor (Kym Marsh).

Hamish comes to The Rovers Return Inn to ask Michelle to organise an event for his daughter's birthday. He also asks her out for a drink, but she turns him down. Michelle later changes her mind and they go to the bistro nearby. Michelle tries to keep their relationship professional, as she is just getting over her break-up with Steve McDonald (Simon Gregson). However, she and Hamish soon begin dating. After Michelle is involved in a minibus crash, Hamish comes to the Rovers to see her. When he learns of her intentions to get back together with Steve, Hamish leaves.

Michael Cregan from Inside Soap observed "There's a gleam in Michelle's eye tonight as she meets handsome new client Hamish. It's not hard to see why, as he's played by the lovely James Redmond". Caroline Corcoran from the Daily Mirror liked the character and felt sympathy for him when Michelle reconciled with Steve. Corcoran said "Oh Non Scottish Hamish! Poor Non Scottish Hamish. The most well-rounded, normal, least psychotic man to arrive on the cobbles in at least 20 years and he's binned off in the space of five dates, via that well-known break-up method where you get your ex-boyfriend along to hold your hand and hope that your new boyfriend gets the message." Corcoran hoped Hamish would return and become a love interest to another character.

== Linda Hancock ==
Linda Hancock
- Coronation Street character
- Portrayed by: Jacqueline Leonard
- Duration: 2015, 2022–2024
- First appearance: Episode 8572; 9 February 2015
- Last appearance: Episode 11,274; 24 May 2024
- Introduced by: Stuart Blackburn (2015); Iain MacLeod (2022, 2023, 2024)
In-universe information
- Other names: Linda Armstrong
- Husband: Owen Armstrong (backstory)
- Daughters: Izzy Armstrong; Katy Armstrong
- Grandsons: Joseph Brown; Jake Windass

Linda Hancock (also Armstrong), played by Jacqueline Leonard, made her first screen appearance on 9 February 2015. Leonard's casting was announced on 18 November 2014, while the character has previously been mentioned by her on-screen family members. Of joining the cast, Leonard said "I am incredibly honoured and excited to be joining the amazing cast of Coronation Street. I love the Northern wit and humour along with the drama and tension that the wonderful scripts of Coronation Street encapsulate. So excited to start!" Linda returned in 2022 and again in 2023 for Chesney and Gemma's wedding.

Linda is established character Owen Armstrong's (Ian Puleston-Davies) ex-wife and the mother of Izzy (Cherylee Houston) and Katy Armstrong (Georgia May Foote). She will come to Weatherfield from Portugal to try and develop a relationship with her daughters, with whom she has not had contact in years. However, Izzy and Katy "believe it's far too late to build bridges", as Owen told them that Linda walked out on them as young children as she could not cope. Daniel Kilkelly from Digital Spy reported that it soon becomes clear Owen has not told Izzy and Katy the whole truth. Linda's presence will also test Owen's relationship with Anna Windass (Debbie Rush).

Owen is horrified when Linda arrives out of the blue from Portugal, where she has remarried and divorced again, to see her daughters. Izzy recognises her and is equally upset by her arrival; however, Katy, who was much younger when Linda left, is intrigued to find out more about her mother. Izzy remains hostile as she believes Linda left because she couldn't cope with having a daughter in a wheelchair. She is shocked when Linda forces Owen to admit that this wasn't true and that he said it in revenge for Linda having an affair. Linda also reveals Owen blocked her attempts to have any relationship with her daughters after she left. After this, Izzy begins to warm to Linda and she and Katy enjoy spending time with their mother. Upset at the idea of leaving them when she returns to Portugal, Linda asks both her daughters to come to live with her there. Izzy says she can't take her son Jake away from his father, but Katy is tempted, despite being in a similar situation with her own son, Joseph. When Owen confronts Linda, she admits she still loves him and asks him for a second chance, suggesting he follow them to Portugal. Owen refuses, saying he loves Anna. Linda is upset but delighted when Katy, after being dumped by Callum Logan (Sean Ward), opts to take her up on her offer. Linda returns to Portugal and Katy and Joseph later join her.

== Gavin Rodwell ==
Gavin Rodwell
- Coronation Street character
- Portrayed by: Mark Holgate
- First appearance: Episode 8587; 2 March 2015
- Last appearance: Episode 8595; 13 March 2015
- Introduced by: Stuart Blackburn
In-universe information
- Father: Michael Rodwell
- Mother: Susan Meldrum
- Stepmother: Gail Rodwell
- Other relatives: Barbara Deakin

Gavin Rodwell, played by Mark Holgate, made his first screen appearance on 2 March 2015. The character's introduction was confirmed on 6 January 2015, while Holgate's casting was announced on 13 January. Gavin is Michael Rodwell's (Les Dennis) real son, his friend Andy Carver (Oliver Farnworth) having pretended to be him.

Andy's girlfriend, Steph Britton (Tisha Merry), the only person who knows his secret, goes to his flat and finds Gavin there. She explains that she is Andy's girlfriend and Gavin makes her stay for a drink. He tells Steph that he has just returned from Thailand and he lost his phone abroad, so he has not been in contact with Andy. Steph and Andy later try to remove any evidence from the flat; however, Gavin finds a payslip from Nick's Bistro in his name. Andy tries to tell Gavin he used his name to avoid his wages being used on his overdraft but, aware Gavin deserves to know about Michael's hereditary heart condition, admits the truth. Despite Andy pointing out that he could have the same condition as Michael, Gavin is not interested in seeing his father or finding out more, being still bitter about Michael leaving him as a child. Andy worries the shock of learning the truth could kill Michael and begs Gavin to keep quiet. Gavin tells Andy that he will – in exchange for £5,000.

When Andy takes the bistro's takings to the bank, he and Steph fake a mugging in order to give the money to Gavin. However, it isn't enough, and Gavin opts to blackmail Michael's fiancée Gail McIntyre (Helen Worth) instead. Gail is horrified by Andy's deception, but agrees to pay Gavin off to protect Michael. Gavin then plans to return to Thailand, but he crashes his car and dies soon afterwards. Having seen Gavin had been drinking, Andy and Gail believe Gavin simply lost control of the car. However, Michael's aunt Barbara Deakin (Beatrice Kelly) later visits Gail and reveals Gavin had a heart attack at the wheel, meaning he inherited Michael's heart condition.

== Jackson Hodge ==
Jackson Hodge
- Coronation Street character
- Portrayed by: Rhys Cadman (2015–2017); Joseph William Evans (2023)
- Duration: 2015, 2017, 2023
- First appearance: Episode 8589; 4 March 2015
- Last appearance: Episode 10959; 24 May 2023
- Introduced by: Stuart Blackburn (2015); Kate Oates (2017); Iain MacLeod (2023)
In-universe information
- Father: Greig Hodge
- Mother: Josie Hodge
- Daughters: Miley Hodge

Jackson Hodge, played by Rhys Cadman from 2015 to 2017 and Joseph William Evans from March 2023, is the father of Faye Windass' (Ellie Leach) baby, Miley Windass (Erin, Eliah and Elsie Halliwell). He first appeared in the episode broadcast on 4 March 2015, before departing on 24 June 2015 with Miley and his parents. He returned with Miley on 17 March 2017. He returned in March 2023.

Jackson first appears when Faye and her parents, Anna Windass (Debbie Rush) and Owen Armstrong (Ian Puleston-Davies) sit next to him and his parents, Greig (Stuart Wolfenden) and Josie Hodge (Una McNulty). Jackson is confirmed as the father of Faye's baby Miley, after she gives birth in an abandoned flat in April 2015. However, Jackson denies that he is Miley's father, even though he is, when Anna calls Greig and Josie to her flat to inform them of this. When Anna takes Miley to Weatherfield High School to force Faye to take responsibility of her daughter, Jackson tells Greig and Josie the truth, with Josie taking Jackson to the Windasses' to apologise and bond with Miley. When Faye is unable to bond with Miley, Josie and Greig offer for Miley to live with them and Jackson and when the Hodges later decide to leave for Canada in June 2015, they take Miley with them, devastating the Windasses, except Faye, who believed that Miley would be better off there.

Faye is left stunned in March 2017 when she unexpectedly sees Jackson and Miley in hospital while being treated for an infected tattoo. It transpires that Greig is in need of a special hip transplant, so the Hodges have returned to the UK for him to have the operation. Faye takes Jackson and Miley back home to see her family; however, her new boyfriend Seb Franklin (Harry Visinoni) is furious that Jackson has returned. He later savagely beats Jackson up in the street, with Seb being arrested for assault later that night. The Hodges then ban Faye from having Miley before returning to Canada.

In 2023, Jackson (now William Evans) and Miley visit Faye. Faye ends up leaving Weatherfield to live with them.

In 2023, Laura-Jayne Tyler from Inside Soap wrote that Jackson had grown up so much that he could "practically see across the pond, let alone live there".

== Greig Hodge ==
Greig Hodge
- Coronation Street character
- Portrayed by: Stuart Wolfenden
- First appearance: Episode 8589; 4 March 2015
- Last appearance: Episode 8668; 24 June 2015
- Introduced by: Stuart Blackburn
In-universe information
- Wife: Josie Hodge
- Sons: Jackson Hodge
- Granddaughters: Miley Hodge

Greig Hodge, played by Stuart Wolfenden, is the father of Jackson Hodge (Rhys Cadman). He attends a meeting with his wife, Josie Hodge, at the school about a trip to France where they chat to Anna Windass (Debbie Rush) and Owen Armstrong (Ian Puleston-Davies) unbeknown that Faye is pregnant with their son's baby. When Anna and Owen find out, they invite Greig and Josie round to their flat and tell them that Jackson is the father to Miley Windass (Erin, Eilah and Elsie).

Greig and Josie later become Miley's permanent carers when all is proven too much for Faye to cope with the responsibility as a teenage mother. The Hodges move to Canada but briefly return to the UK in 2017 when Greig undergoes hip surgery but only Jackson and Miley reappear on-screen. Greig is Wolfenden's third role on Coronation Street, as he played a paper delivered called Craig Russell between January and September 1986, and then played mechanic Mark Casey, which was a regular role, between 1989 and 1991.

== Josie Hodge ==
Josie Hodge
- Coronation Street character
- Portrayed by: Una McNulty
- First appearance: Episode 8589; 4 March 2015
- Last appearance: Episode 8668; 24 June 2015
- Introduced by: Stuart Blackburn
In-universe information
- Husband: Greig Hodge
- Sons: Jackson Hodge
- Granddaughters: Miley Hodge

Josie Hodge, played by Una McNulty, is the mother of Jackson Hodge (Rhys Cadman). She attends a meeting with her husband, Greig Hodge, at the school about a trip to France where they chat to Anna Windass (Debbie Rush) and Owen Armstrong (Ian Puleston-Davies) unbeknown that Faye is pregnant with their son's baby. When Anna and Owen find out, they invite Greig and Josie round to their flat and tell them that Jackson is the father to Miley Windass (Erin, Eilah and Elsie).

Greig and Josie later become Miley's permanent carers when all is proven too much for Faye to cope with the responsibility as a teenage mother. The Hodges move to Canada but briefly return to the UK in 2017 when Greig undergoes hip surgery but only Jackson and Miley reappear on-screen.

== Miley Hodge ==
Miley Hodge
- Coronation Street character
- Portrayed by: Erin, Eilah and Elsie Halliwell (2015–2017); Frankie-Jae Simmonds (2023)
- Duration: 2015, 2017, 2023
- First appearance: Episode 8610; 3 April 2015
- Last appearance: Episode 10959; 24 May 2023
- Introduced by: Stuart Blackburn (2015); Kate Oates (2017); Ian MacLeod (2023)
In-universe information
- Other names: Miley Windass
- Father: Jackson Hodge
- Mother: Faye Windass
- Grandfathers: Greig Hodge; Tim Metcalfe
- Grandmothers: Josie Hodge; Anna Windass (adoptive)
- Uncles: Gary Windass (adoptive)
- First cousins: Jake Windass (adoptive); Zack Rubinstein (adoptive)
- Other relatives: Geoff Metcalfe; Elaine Jones

Miley Hodge (also Windass), played by Erin, Eilah and Elsie Halliwell from 2015 to 2017 and Frankie-Jae Simmonds from March 2023, is the daughter of Jackson Hodge (Rhys Cadman) and Faye Windass (Ellie Leach). She made her first screen appearance on 3 April 2015. Triplets Erin, Eilah and Elsie were cast as Miley after the show sent out a call to casting agents and placed posters in maternity units asking for identical twin girls. The triplets' parents had been advised to contact an agent, as twins and triplets are sought after in the acting industry. The girls' father said "We sent some photos over and within two hours we heard back to say they had a client who was interested. On the Monday we were at Coronation Street." Miley returned on 17 March 2017 with her father, Jackson.

Faye discovers she is pregnant in February 2015 and with the support of only her school classmate, Craig Tinker (Colson Smith), she plans to abandon the baby at the hospital once she gives birth. Faye and Craig steal the keys from the shop to Dev Alahan's (Jimmi Harkishin) flat, where Faye goes into labour. Sophie Webster (Brooke Vincent) finds Faye and helps her, before Faye's parents, Anna and Tim Metcalfe (Joe Duttine), arrive. Faye is taken to hospital and gives birth to a daughter. Anna asks Faye if she wants to hold the baby but Faye refuses to hold or look at her. Faye and the baby come home from hospital after Faye is interviewed about the father. It is revealed to be Jackson Hodge, who denies getting Faye pregnant. Anna kicks out Jackson and his family after his mother is cruel about Faye. During a meeting with a social worker, Faye admits that she is not ready to be a mother and thinks that if she gives her baby up, everything will go back to normal, but Owen Armstrong (Ian Puleston-Davies) assures her that giving the baby up is not the best solution. Faye later names her daughter Miley, after the singer Miley Cyrus.

Anna looks after Miley as Faye ignores her baby daughter. Anna later confronts Faye at school, feeling it is time Faye took responsibility and leaves Miley with Faye after embarrassing her in front of her friends, including Miley's father, Jackson. Faye confronts Tim and Anna about her reasons for not being there for Miley, just as Jackson and his mother, Josie, visit. Josie tells her that Jackson has admitted being Miley's father and they are determined to pull together with Tim and Anna to give Miley a good upbringing. Jackson apologizes to Faye for denying that he got her pregnant and Faye forgives him. Tim later suggests getting Miley christened during a discussion with Anna, Faye and Sally Webster (Sally Dynevor). Faye and Jackson go to the registry office to register Miley's birth legally. The teenage parents argue over Faye naming the baby Miley, as Jackson feels that Miley may be bullied at school for being named after a singer. At Miley's christening, Faye breaks down and tells Tim that she is not ready to be a mother. Seeing that Faye is unable to cope with the responsibility, Greig and Josie suggest that Miley go to live with them. Tim come rounds to the idea, thinking that it would be best for everyone, including Faye but Anna is against the idea. When discussing the idea, Faye admits that she could never hate or blame Miley for recent events but loves her daughter and wants what is best for her. In the end, Miley is collected by Josie, as the Windasses share an emotional farewell. Tim admits to Anna and Faye that they, most likely, will not see Miley again, as the Hodges have emigrated to Canada. Tim and Anna discuss it with Faye and Tim says he will get Miley back, but Faye decides Miley will be better off in Canada.

When Faye goes to hospital with an infected tattoo in March 2017, she sees Miley and Jackson. Tim and Anna meet Miley again when Jackson brings her to Faye's house with Faye's brother, Gary Windass (Mikey North) and his ex-girlfriend, Izzy Armstrong (Cherylee Houston). When Jackson is physically assaulted by Faye's boyfriend, Seb Franklin (Harry Visinoni), Josie refuses to let Miley spend time with Faye and her family. However, a year later, Faye decides to visit Miley after Anna is imprisoned for the murders and crimes of Pat Phelan (Connor McIntyre). She later mentioned this to her that Josie finally allowed her to see Miley anytime she wants. They later decide to spend more time with her after Phelan's downfall to death.

=== Development ===
On 19 June 2014, it was announced that Faye would fall pregnant at the age of 12, with a show source saying it "is bound to be a controversial storyline but the programme has a history of handling difficult subject matters in a sensitive and considerate way" and that "bosses are still working out the exact details of the controversial storyline, including who the father is." Previously done with Sarah-Louise Platt (Tina O'Brien), producer Stuart Blackburn, said that while "in some respects life went back to normal" for Sarah, "that won't happen" with Faye. Debbie Rush discussed scenes where Faye goes into labour, saying "Obviously none of the family know about it, there's only Craig in on it. As the week unfolds we'll see how he becomes a really good friend" and that "everything explodes." She said that Faye "panics at the end and needs her family" She added that "It's not going to be roses around the door. We're showing just how serious it is" and they hope "that's going to come across. It's not a good thing, and it's really tough on all the family and everyone concerned." Rush described Faye as "an annoying teenager but she came from a really unhappy, broken background – passed from pillar to post."

Following the birth, Faye struggles to bond with Miley, who she names after pop singer Miley Cyrus. Rush explained "Faye doesn't choose the name for a while [...] because she's completely in denial." and Faye "calls her Miley, like Wrecking Ball" as Miley "is a wrecking ball!" Jackson Hodge (Rhys Cadman) initially denies being Miley's father, but Jackson and his parents later want to be involved with Miley; however, Anna "realises just how much motherhood is taking its toll" on Faye and she is "forced to consider the possibility of Miley living with the Hodge's." Rush explains "she wants Faye to take responsibility as she thinks that is the best way to get her to bond with the baby" despite Anna knowing "how much Faye has been struggling with the fact that she's now a mum but she's done her best to try and encourage Faye to do the right thing." She added that Anna has "adopted the tough love approach with Faye." Rush says the family are "heartbroken" when it's decided Miley should live with Jackson and his parents, though it's the "right thing for Miley." Faye's pregnancy and Miley's birth acts as a catalyst for the departure of Anna's long-term partner, Owen Armstrong (Ian Puleston-Davies). Owen wrongly assumes Craig is the father and he assaults Craig and Owen's "attitude in the wake of Faye giving birth is the final straw for Anna."

== Adrian Mortimer ==
Adrian Mortimer
- Coronation Street character
- Portrayed by: Mark Moraghan
- First appearance: Episode 8611; 6 April 2015
- Last appearance: Episode 8655; 5 June 2015
- Introduced by: Stuart Blackburn

Adrian Mortimer, played by Mark Moraghan, made his first screen appearance on 6 April 2015. The character and casting was announced on 24 February 2015. Moraghan began filming the week before his casting announcement and was contracted for a few months. Adrian departed on 5 June 2015 after two months on the show. Adrian was introduced as a love interest for Eileen Grimshaw (Sue Cleaver). They met when Eileen tried internet dating.

== Cathy Matthews ==
Cathy Matthews
- Coronation Street character
- Portrayed by: Melanie Hill
- Duration: 2015–2022
- First appearance: Episode 8621; 20 April 2015
- Last appearance: Episode 10,668; 17 June 2022
- Introduced by: Stuart Blackburn
In-universe information
- Occupation: Art teacher Waitress; Shop assistant Catering Assistant
- Sisters: Nessa Warner
- Husband: Alan Matthews (backstory)
- Nephews: Alex Warner

Cathy Matthews, played by Melanie Hill, made her first screen appearance on 20 April 2015. The character and Hill's casting was announced on 23 February 2015. Of her casting, Hill said "I'm chuffed to bits to be joining the cast of my favourite soap. My family and I grew up watching it and to actually be working on it is a dream come true." Cathy was introduced as a potential love interest for Roy Cropper (David Neilson). Cathy owns an allotment and is also getting over the death of her spouse. Series producer Stuart Blackburn described Cathy as "an engaging yet sometimes chaotic woman." He said she had "a heart of gold" and her friendship with Roy would help to "bring out the best in her."

An Inside Soap reporter praised Cathy's introduction, saying "Actress Melanie Hill makes a great first impression as recently bereaved Cathy, but we'll be keeping an eye on how things go between her and Roy. We're still grieving for Hayley (Julie Hesmondhalgh), too!" On 14 May 2022 it was announced that Hill would be leaving the soap after seven years with Cathy set to depart the show later this year and Cathy departed on 17 June 2022.

Cathy first appears ordering Roy and Sharif Nazir (Marc Anwar) not to ruin her late husband, Alan's garden patch at the local allotments. Roy is concerned for Cathy as Alan's patch looks very untidy, and attempts to clear it up for her; however, Cathy shouts at him and orders him to leave. He returns to the allotments and apologises to Cathy and they realise they have a mutual connection as they are both widowed. Roy invites Cathy to his café in Weatherfield; however, she is reluctant as she is still grieving for Alan. She does so, and is welcomed by the local residents. When it transpires that she has a natural talent in art, Yasmeen Nazir (Shelley King) offers Cathy the opportunity to run her own art classes at the Weatherfield Community Centre. She is at first reluctant due to her shy personality; however, she is pleased by the support Roy and the local residents give her.

Roy, Fiz Stape (Jennie McAlpine) and Tyrone Dobbs (Alan Halsall) become suspicious as to why Cathy never invites Roy back to her house or ever mentions her house. Eventually, Roy and Carla Connor (Alison King) go to investigate, and find bailiffs knocking on the door and Cathy shouting at them from a window. The bailiffs leave after being persuaded by Roy and Carla, and Cathy reluctantly lets them in. It is then revealed that Cathy is a hoarder, keeping all of Alan's old belongings and unnecessary items such as ancient newspapers and milk bottles. Roy is adamant that he is going to help Cathy overcome her hoarding; however, after he throws out some of the junk, Cathy is overwhelmed with guilt and orders him to leave. She later apologises and bakes him a cake to apologise; however, when she tries to reach a book from the bottom of a pile of boxes, the boxes and other large heaps of clutter fall on Cathy, trapping her. Later, Roy arrives and breaks the door down to save Cathy, and after Cathy admits that she is not safe living in her house, Roy insists that she moves into the café flat with him for a while. The next day, Roy treats Cathy to a trip to an art gallery, while Fiz, Tyrone and Chesney Brown (Sam Aston) attempt to clear out some of her clutter. However, when Roy and Cathy return to her house, Cathy breaks down as Fiz, Tyrone and Chesney have completely cleared out all of the clutter, and she orders everybody to leave other than Roy. He eventually manages to show Cathy that the clutter was putting her in danger, but she reveals she cannot move back yet. A few weeks later, she finally decides she can move back into her house; however, Roy confides in her that Fiz's young daughter Hope has cancer and that he values Cathy's company during this difficult time, so she remains in Weatherfield for his sake.

Cathy later reveals to Anna Windass (Debbie Rush) that she has developed feelings for Roy; however, she is worried that telling him will damage their friendship. When Cathy's nephew, Alex Warner (Liam Bairstow) visits the café, he teases Roy and Cathy about how close they are, which upsets and embarrasses Roy. On Roy's birthday in September, Cathy organises a train-themed party at the café for him; however, he is upset over Hayley and orders everybody to leave, but Carla assures him that starting a relationship with Cathy would not be betraying Hayley. Cathy then decides to leave Weatherfield after believing Roy will never be able to get over Hayley and start a relationship with her, but her bus breaks down outside the café and Roy admits he has feelings for her too, leading to the pair passionately kissing. Cathy is later frustrated by the arrival of her loud and shameless sister Nessa Warner (Sadie Shimmin), and feels ashamed when she begins a lustful relationship with the recently widowed Ken Barlow (William Roache). On New Year's Day 2016, Cathy decides to clear out the rest of the clutter at her house as a New Year's resolution. When Roy helps her by clearing out Alan's office, he stumbles across some love letters that Alan and Nessa had sent to one another, revealing that they were having an affair behind Cathy's back. Roy is unsure of what to do and confides in Anna, who encourages him to confront Nessa. As Cathy returns to her house to continue with the clear out, she herself comes across the love letters, and when Roy and Nessa arrive, Cathy angrily shouts at Nessa and throws her out before breaking down in tears. Roy then lets slip that he found out about the affair the previous day, and came to the house to help Nessa dispose of the love letters, leading to Cathy throwing Roy out, too.

The following day, Cathy ends her relationship with Roy, stating that he has terminated their mutual trust. She later sets fire to Alan and Nessa's love letters after reading them all; however, when she becomes distracted by a phonecall, the fire spreads rapidly. When she witnesses the fire, heaps of clutter fall in the path of the only exit in her haste to reach a sheet in an attempt to calm the flames. Fortunately, Roy and Nessa arrive, and Roy enters the burning house and saves Cathy, who had managed to crawl away from the flames despite suffering from minor smoke inhalation. She is extremely thankful to Roy for saving her; however, hostile towards Nessa, after realising how intimate her affair with Alan was. Cathy then returns to live with Roy, and the pair confess their love for one another. While Roy is caring for his mother, Sylvia Goodwin (Stephanie Cole), who has injured her ankle, Cathy allows Alex to move into the café after he falls out with Nessa. In May 2016, Cathy attends Carla and Nick Tilsley's (Ben Price) wedding with Roy upon his return. When she returns to the café after the nuptials are ruined, Alex convinces her that she should propose to Roy, which she does but he declines as Carla is in an unstable state. Upset, she takes Alex to the corner shop, but as they exit, Carla attempts to run over her arch-enemy Tracy Barlow (Kate Ford), but swerves and Cathy is hit by her car as she pushes Alex back into the shop to save him. She is rushed to hospital and told she has concussion and broken ribs, and is devastated when Roy refuses to talk to Carla over the incident, but manages to change his mind before Carla leaves Weatherfield.

After their previous attempt, Roy proposes to Cathy in the café, to which she delightfully accepts. When Alex expresses an interest in purchasing one of Pat Phelan's (Connor McIntyre) flats, Cathy decides to take it upon herself to ask his father, Nigel (Jim Cartwright), for the money for him to do so. However, Nigel is extremely hostile towards Cathy, and after she inquires about his despicable behaviour, he lets slip that somebody ordered him to keep quiet about who has been paying for Alex's maintenance. Confused, Cathy investigates through some old documents, and later confides in Yasmeen that she believes that Alex is the result of her husband, Alan's, affair with her sister, Nessa. Concerned that her theory may be correct, Cathy visits Nigel again; however, this time he confirms that Alex is Alan's son, with Cathy taking her frustrations out on Alex. It later transpires that Alex knew all along that Alan was his biological father, and announces that he is going to live with Nessa in Scotland, worrying that he has upset Cathy. The situation eventually takes its toll on Roy and Cathy's relationship, as Roy disagrees with Cathy's treatment of Alex, and he soon comes to the conclusion that the couple need some time apart. On their way to Scotland, the car breaks down and Alex later admits he does not want to live with Nessa and he moves back to Weatherfield. Cathy and Alex make a truce and she reunites with Roy, resuming their relationship.

Cathy continues to gleefully organise her wedding to Roy, unaware that Roy does not love her because he is still in love with Hayley. She is frustrated by the return of Nessa, and is angry when she teases to the residents about Roy sleepwalking into her bedroom. Due to this, Cathy asks Roy whether they should cancel the wedding, and is shattered when Roy believes that it is for the best. She is upset when she finds Roy cancelling the arrangements early in the morning, and that he has informed half of the guests. However, after Roy suffers a panic attack in the Bistro, the wedding is called back on, delighting Cathy while worrying Roy. Worried about remembering her wedding vows, Cathy records them on a dictaphone to help her recite them. Eventually, Tyrone and Brian Packham (Peter Gunn) confront Roy about his feelings, and he admits that he is only marrying Cathy because he promised her when she proposed to him; however, the three of them are unaware that Cathy's dictaphone has recorded their conversation. On the day of the wedding, Cathy is joyful and she prepares to marry Roy, but is confused when she hears that Tyrone and Brian have been banned from attending. Upon arriving at the church, she allows Nessa to give her away, and listens to her vows one last time, but she listens to Roy confessing his true feelings instead. She enters the church and calmly confronts Roy, asking the wedding guests to leave. After proposing that they remain close friends, Cathy is crushed by Roy's enthusiasm at the prospect of them breaking up. As a result, Cathy and Alex move out of Roy's flat and in with Yasmeen.

Cathy struggles to move on from her breakup with Roy; however, later she finds happiness when she enters a relationship with Brian. After securing two jobs at the kebab shop and the corner shop both owned by Dev Alahan (Jimmi Harkishin), Cathy and Brian move into the flat next to the Bistro with Alex. Cathy later suggests to Brian that they look into purchasing a shop to sell antiques. However, this idea eventually fizzles out when Brian decides to return to teaching. Cathy is the first to notice that Brian is being bullied by the deputy headteacher, Phil Gillespie (Tom Turner), when he takes credit for Brian's hardworking ethic. As Phil puts more pressure on Brian to achieve, Brian ends up collapsing and suffering a mild heart attack from the stress. Eventually, Cathy joins forces with David Platt (Jack P. Shepherd), Shona Ramsey (Julia Goulding) and Evelyn Plummer (Maureen Lipman) to stand up to Phil for Brian in The Rovers. Cathy later worries about Yasmeen's well-being after suspicions are raised about her new husband, Geoff Metcalfe's (Ian Bartholomew), treatment towards her. Unbeknownst to Cathy, Geoff is coercively controlling and psychologically abusing Yasmeen, and after Cathy overhears an argument between them, Geoff forbids Yasmeen from seeing Cathy.

== Marion Logan ==
Marion Logan
- Coronation Street character
- Portrayed by: Susan Cookson (2015–2016); Kerry Peers (2019–2020)
- Duration: 2015–2016, 2019–2020
- First appearance: Episode 8611; 18 May 2015
- Last appearance: Episode 8655; 20 January 2020
- Introduced by: Stuart Blackburn
In-universe information
- Occupation: Teacher
- Sons: Callum Logan
- Grandsons: Max Turner; Harry Platt

Marion Logan is the mother of drug dealer Callum Logan (Sean Ward) and the grandmother of Max Turner (Harry McDermott). She was originally played by Susan Cookson, appearing between 18 May 2015 and 14 June 2016. She accompanies Callum to his mediation session with David Platt (Jack P. Shepherd). She befriends David's mother, Gail Rodwell (Helen Worth), and they agree to help their sons. In December 2015, David's half-sister Sarah (Tina O'Brien) discovers she is pregnant with Callum's baby so this will make Marion a grandmother to two grandchildren within the Platt family. Subsequently, Sarah gives birth to Harry Platt (Pixie and Presley Sellars), who Marion wants to be a part of his life, but Sarah refuses.

Marion returns three years later on 16 October 2019, now played by former The Bill actress Kerry Peers, as Cookson was cast as series regular Wendy Posner in ITV soap opera Emmerdale, after Max reaches out to her after an incident at home where his stepmother Shona Ramsey (Julia Goulding) blames him for pushing his half-brother Harry when it was in fact his half-sister Lily Platt (Brooke Malonie). Marion tries to gain custody of both her grandsons, but doesn't succeed and then departs again on 20 January 2020.

== Dan Jones ==
Dan Jones
- Coronation Street character
- Portrayed by: Andrew Paul
- First appearance: Episode 8658; 10 June 2015
- Last appearance: Episode 8690; 22 July 2015
- Introduced by: Stuart Blackburn
In-universe information
- Occupation: Brewery worker (until 2015)
- Daughters: Lucy Jones

Dan Jones, played by Andrew Paul, made his first screen appearance on 10 June 2015. The character and casting was announced on 7 May 2015. Paul was initially contracted for a few months, but his contract could be extended if he proves popular with viewers. Dan is a brewery worker, who catches the eye of Liz McDonald (Beverley Callard). He is billed as being "a good looking charmer with a great line in patter". Dan also has a history with another character and when his "dark secret is exposed" his true personality will be revealed.

Dan met Liz in 2014, and, although she almost agreed to a date with him, she later began a relationship with Tony Stewart (Terence Maynard). The following year, after Liz and Tony's relationship ends, Dan invites Liz out for lunch. They later have sex and begin dating. It soon emerges that Dan is a former client of Liz's friend, ex-prostitute, Leanne Battersby (Jane Danson), and that he used to beat her after they had sex. Although Leanne is adamant on informing Liz that Dan is a dangerous man, he later blackmails her, threatening that, if she tells Liz about his past, he will tell her stepson, Simon (Alex Bain), about hers as a prostitute. As time passes by, Leanne, once again, witnesses Dan's violent ways and, unable to stand by and watch Liz get hurt, informs her of what Dan did to her. Liz confronts Dan, in front of his boss and daughter, Lucy (Sammy Oliver), and, despite his efforts to convince everyone that he is innocent, he is fired from his job. Lucy disowns him and Liz throws Dan out of the pub, telling him she never wants to see him again.

The following day, Dan is adamant for revenge on Leanne and Liz and when he spies Leanne leaving work, he follows her home, exclaiming how she and Liz have ruined his life. As Leanne arrives at her flat, Dan forces his way in and throws her to the ground violently. Dan then enters the flat holding Leanne's wrist, and now holds Leanne, Simon and Liz, who was looking after Simon while Leanne was at work, hostage. Liz attempts to talk Dan round by telling him that they could give their relationship another go, but he sees through her antics and when Leanne shouts for help, he violently attacks her and as Liz tries to stop him, she hits her head and collapses. As Liz rises to her feet, Dan reveals the awful truth to a terrified and confused Simon that Leanne used to be a prostitute. Leanne then attacks Dan, allowing Simon and Liz to escape, and they call the police. After Leanne tells him that his daughter will forgive him, Dan allows Leanne to leave, after Zeedan Nazir (Qasim Akhtar) tries to save her by kicking the door down. Leanne, Simon and Liz give statements to the police about the hostage situation, and Dan is arrested.

A writer from ITVX put Dan on their list of Liz' top ten lovers and called him a "prostitute-beater" with a "seedy past".

== Joni Preston ==
Joni Preston
- Coronation Street character
- Portrayed by: Sarah Harding
- First appearance: Episode 8691; 23 July 2015
- Last appearance: Episode 8700; 3 August 2015
- Introduced by: Stuart Blackburn
In-universe information
- Occupation: Waitress
- Husband: Robert Preston (until 2015)

Joni Preston, played by former Girls Aloud singer Sarah Harding, made her first appearance on 23 July 2015. Harding's casting was announced on 1 April 2015 and she began filming the following month. Harding explained that she received the role following an appearance on the set in 2014 for another show. She asked producers if they ever had cameo appearances and the series producer Stuart Blackburn later got in touch to offer her the role of Joni. Of her casting, Harding said "I am extremely excited to be joining Coronation Street. As a fan of the show it is a huge honour for me to join the cast. I can't wait to get started!" Harding was initially contracted for four episodes.

Joni is the wife of Robert Preston (Tristan Gemmill). She is furious to discover that he has begun a relationship with his ex-wife Tracy Barlow (Kate Ford) behind her back. Harding explained that Joni knew that Robert was not over Tracy, but it still came as a shock to her. She explained, "Joni is a woman on the edge, and she's very vulnerable. While she's angry and feisty, she's also hurting. If you caught your husband cheating, you'd be the same!" Harding added that Joni did not want to be second to Tracy and that there would be "fireworks" between them. Harding's first appearance as Joni received a mixed reaction from viewers.

Joni goes to The Kabin and asks Rita Tanner (Barbara Knox) and Emily Bishop (Eileen Derbyshire) where Tracy Barlow lives, and lies saying that she knew the late Deirdre Barlow (Anne Kirkbride) from work. She then angrily knocks on the Barlows' door, but Norris Cole (Malcolm Hebden) emerges from his house and reveals that Tracy, Robert and Ken Barlow (William Roache) have gone out for the day. The next day, Joni is furious to see Tracy and her friend Beth Sutherland (Lisa George) at her and Robert's restaurant, and when Tracy kisses Robert, Joni storms over and slaps Tracy, throwing her and Beth out of the restaurant. Robert later tells Tracy that his marriage is over. Joni tracks down Robert at The Bistro and gets him to sign over the restaurant to her. Beth later storms in and accuses her and Robert of many things and when she says her marriage is over and Beth apologises and becomes kinder.

== Dougie Ryan ==
Dougie Ryan
- Coronation Street character
- Portrayed by: Paddy McGuinness
- First appearance: Episode 8709; 17 August 2015
- Last appearance: Episode 8714; 21 August 2015
- Introduced by: Stuart Blackburn
In-universe information
- Daughters: Caitlin Ryan

Dougie Ryan, played by Paddy McGuinness, made his first appearance on 17 August 2015. He appeared during a camping trip with the Dobbs and Tinker families. He departed on 21 August 2015 after 4 days appearing in the show. Speaking of his casting McGuiness said: "Being asked to appear in Coronation Street was a very special moment for me." He continued: "I remember Peter [Kay] telling me how much he enjoyed his guest spot on the show, and I can't wait to get started. [It's] an iconic and much-loved show, not just in the UK but around the world. The character I'll be playing is very funny, and I'm sure the Corrie fans will love him."

Executive producer Stuart Blackburn also commented: "It's an absolute delight to be working with Paddy who is a talented actor with a flair for comedy that will ensure he fits right in with the Corrie cast." Nayer Nissim from Digital Spy explained: "Dougie appears in six episodes, and will be putting Kirk (Andrew Whyment), Beth (Lisa George), Craig (Colson Smith), Chesney (Sam Ashton), Sinead (Katie McGlynn), Tyrone (Alan Halsall) and Fiz (Jennie McAlpine) through their paces."

== Caitlin Ryan ==
Caitlin Ryan
- Coronation Street character
- Portrayed by: Eve Gordon
- Duration: 2015–2016
- First appearance: Episode 8709; 17 August 2015
- Last appearance: Episode 8903; 13 May 2016
- Introduced by: Stuart Blackburn
In-universe information
- Father: Dougie Ryan

Caitlin Ryan, played by Eve Gordon, made her first appearance on 17 August 2015. She appeared on a camping trip with her father, Dougie (Paddy McGuinness) and the Dobbs and Tinker families. She was also introduced as a love interest for Craig Tinker (Colson Smith). Caitlin later agrees to go on a date with Craig, but he receives a text saying she can not make it. She returned on 5 October to visit Craig in the street.

In August, Craig goes on a camping trip with Beth Sutherland (Lisa George), Kirk Sutherland (Andy Whyment), Chesney Brown (Sam Aston), Sinead Tinker (Katie McGlynn), Fiz Stape (Jennie McAlpine), Tyrone Dobbs (Alan Halsall), wilderness explorer Dougie, and Dougie's daughter Caitlin, who falls in love with him and vice versa. Craig is upset the following month when Caitlin stands him up, but she turns up at the Bistro and apologises as her dad was in A&E. Caitlin visits Craig at his and work on Art together, though when Craig lends Caitlin a jumper so she doesn't get her clothing dirty, Beth catches them in, what she thinks, a compromising position. Caitlin has tea with Beth and Kirk and Craig is mortified when they embarrass him. When Caitlin is due to visit, Craig confides in Faye that he's not ready to take his relationship with Caitlin further as he is not ready. Craig cancels on Caitlin, pretending he is ill, but she visits and Faye encourages him to talk to her. Craig admits that he is not ready and Caitlin admits she's not ready either. Caitlin later decides to end the brief relationship so she can go to university in Dundee, leaving Craig heartbroken.

== Aidan Connor ==
Aidan Connor
- Coronation Street character
- Portrayed by: Shayne Ward
- Duration: 2015–2018
- First appearance: Episode 8713; 21 August 2015
- Last appearance: Episode 9450; 10 August 2018
- Introduced by: Stuart Blackburn
In-universe information
- Other names: Aidan Finbar Connor
- Occupation: Businessman
- Father: Johnny Connor
- Mother: Lou Connor
- Stepmother: Jenny Bradley
- Sisters: Kate Connor
- Half-sisters: Carla Connor
- Daughters: Susie Price
- Other relatives: Barry Connor; Michelle Connor; Ali Neeson; Ryan Connor (adoptive); Ruairi McDonald; Paul Connor; Liam Connor; Liam Connor Jr.

Aidan Connor, played by Shayne Ward, made his first screen appearance on 21 August 2015. The character and Ward's casting was announced on 12 May 2015. Ward auditioned for the show in late March. He was initially contracted for one year. Of his casting, Ward said "On hearing the news I had been offered the part on the show, I was in total disbelief. It still hasn't sunk in. Shayne Ward, the lad from Manchester, given such a role on such an iconic show – it is an absolute dream come true. I'm excited to walk down those famous cobbles."

Aidan is a distant cousin of Michelle Connor (Kym Marsh) and grew up on the same estate as Michelle and Carla Connor (Alison King). He is Mancunian-Irish, like Ward, and billed as charismatic, ambitious and "a nice guy". Ward thought it would be fun if Aidan became "a little bit nasty" in the future. Aidan is called to the Street by Michelle, who explains that Carla's business is in trouble. He then offers to invest in her factory. Aidan has made an enemy out of Robert Preston (Tristan Gemmill). He has been involved in a love triangle between Eva and Maria Connor (Samia Ghadie). In December 2017, Aidan met with Carla and told her everything that happened on his wedding day and begged her for help reopening the factory. In March 2018, Aidan gave a kidney to Carla after he was a match with his sister, due to this Carla decided to sign the factory over to Aidan. In April 2018, Eva told Aidan that she is seven months pregnant with his baby, Aidan was quick to reject Eva due to her fake pregnancy lie on their wedding day. Aidan told Eva to leave, which she did and Eva told Toyah Battersby (Georgia Taylor) that the deal is back on, which was overheard by Simon Barlow (Alex Bain). The following month, Eva gives birth to a baby girl, whom Toyah and Peter named Susie with Peter still unaware of Susie's real parents.

Initial critical reception following Aidan's arrival was mixed; Laura-Jayne Tyler of Inside Soap wondered why Aidan wanted to invest money into a failing Underworld, "Why is Aidan willingly ploughing £40k of savings into a factory that he knows is going bust? Is the poor lad lonely, and just in desperate need of some company?"

On 30 April 2018, it was confirmed that Aidan would die by suicide, with his final scenes airing on 7 May 2018. Coronation Street's writers worked with CALM and the Samaritans when creating the storyline so as to explore the issue of suicide responsibly, and the suicide itself was not shown onscreen. Reception to the treatment of Aidan's suicide and its aftermath was lauded, with fans widely praising the "heartbreaking episode" and Aidan's actor Shayne Ward describing being "overwhelmed" by the reaction. Ward explained how the suicide storyline had helped others in seeking help, with the soap being praised for raising awareness on mental health issues and male suicide.

Aidan appeared posthumously in August 2018 in a pre-recorded transplant documentary that Alya watches, and makes her decide to give the factory back to the Connors after hearing Aidan mention how much his family means to him.

== Alex Warner ==
Alex Warner
- Coronation Street character
- Portrayed by: Liam Bairstow
- Duration: 2015–present
- First appearance: Episode 8733; 13 September 2015
- Introduced by: Stuart Blackburn
In-universe information
- Occupation: Waiter
- Father: Alan Matthews
- Mother: Nessa Warner
- Aunts: Cathy Matthews

Alex Warner, played by Liam Bairstow, made his first appearance on 13 September 2015. The character and casting was announced on 11 August 2015. Bairstow is the first actor with Downs' Syndrome to be hired by the show. He was spotted by producers at a workshop held for actors with disabilities. Alex is the nephew of established character Cathy Matthews (Melanie Hill). Digital Spy noted that Bairstow's performance as Alex "went down a storm with fans" and that the soap had "found itself a new rising star".

Bairstow spoke to Digital Spy about his new role, stating how happy he is in the role of Alex: "I feel really happy to be part of Coronation Street because I was a big fan of the show when I was a little boy." Bairstow admitted that he had not expected to get an acting job through the workshop and was emotional when he found out. He commented that joining the show has been "unbelievable", while the cast had been great to work with, especially David Neilson, who plays Roy Cropper, and Melanie Hill.

Cathy arranges for her nephew Alex Warner to visit Weatherfield. Roy thinks Alex is a child and picks up a board game while fetching some bric-a-brac from Cathy's house for him. Roy arrives back at the café and meets Alex, who has Down's syndrome. Alex asks Cathy if he can stay the night as he has had an argument with his mother and Roy agrees. Roy closes the café and plays his childhood favourite game, Escalado, with Cathy and Alex. Cathy feels awkward when Alex assumes Roy is her boyfriend. The trio then go to the pub, where Alex's words make Cathy admit to Anna Windass (Debbie Rush) that she would like Roy to be more than a friend but is afraid of losing their friendship if she were to tell him. The next day, Alex takes a train back home. Roy and Cathy mark Roy's 61st birthday. Cathy is embarrassed when Alex sends Roy a birthday card from her that says "I love you" on it.

Alex's mother and Cathy's sister, Nessa Warner (Sadie Shimmin), turns up at Roy's Rolls looking for Alex, who has been missing overnight. Roy takes Nessa to the art class to break the news to Cathy and the attendees volunteer to help search. Ken Barlow (William Roache) and Audrey Roberts (Sue Nicholls) find Alex enjoying a drink in The Rovers with Liz McDonald (Beverley Callard). Ken quickly runs to fetch Roy, Nessa and Cathy. When Nessa arrives in The Rovers, she is relieved to see Alex and fusses over him to his embarrassment. Roy talks to Alex and makes him see how much he worried Nessa by staying out all night. He explains how his battery died on his mobile phone and he stayed with a friend called Jordan but refuses to elaborate further. Alex apologises to Nessa.

In 2017, Laura-Jayne Tyler from Inside Soap wrote that it was "great to see Alex again" following his break from the soap. Following another break, Tyler wrote in 2023, "Welcome back to the cobbles, lovely Liam – who made us laugh more often this week than all the other soaps put together". Warner had another break throughout 2025; after making an appearance on 1 January 2025, he did not appear again until March 2026.

== Jamie Bowman ==
Jamie Bowman
- Coronation Street character
- Portrayed by: James Atherton
- Duration: 2015–2016
- First appearance: Episode 8735; 14 September 2015
- Last appearance: Episode 8820; 18 January 2016
- Introduced by: Stuart Blackburn

Jamie Bowman, played by former Hollyoaks actor James Atherton, made his first appearance on 14 September 2015. The character and Atherton's casting was announced on 6 August 2015. Jamie is a friend of Luke Britton (Dean Fagan) and the former boyfriend of his sister Steph Britton (Tisha Merry). He will cause trouble for them both during his time on the Street.

Jamie is first mentioned when Luke, his girlfriend Maria Connor (Samia Ghadie), Steph, her boyfriend Andy Carver (Oliver Farnworth) and their friend Kirk Sutherland (Andrew Whyment) decide to go to the racing and Luke invites him along, following their former days stock car racing. Andy notices that Steph is uneasy around Jamie, resulting in him believing that Steph fancies Jamie. He helps Luke prepare the stock car. Luke attempts to quell Andy's fears about Steph and Jamie by telling him they were a couple ages ago, but only makes matters worse. Jamie persuades Luke to join a race but Luke swears him to secrecy. When Luke decides not to participate in the race, Jamie reveals that he possesses explicit photographs of Steph and will post them online if he does not cooperate; Luke reluctantly agrees. He wins the race and Jamie wins a large amount of money, but Andy and Steph discover about the race and demand to know why he took part. When Jamie decides he needs more money, he blackmails Luke again with the photographs of Steph, and he tells Andy. Steph later witnesses Luke threatening Jamie, and learns of the images that Jamie has of her. She is distraught, and after realising how much pressure it is putting on Luke and Andy, she calls Jamie's bluff in The Rovers and dares him to post the pictures; he does, and Steph is left humiliated and devastated. However, after Andy punches Jamie, the police arrive and arrest him for revenge porn, after Steph was prompted to involve the police by her employer Leanne Battersby (Jane Danson).

In January 2016, Jamie returns with his friend, Lee, after Luke and Andy get them sacked from a job in a bar by exposing Jamie's torment of Steph. They are intent of seeking revenge, and plan to rob the local restaurant, the bistro, where Steph and Andy work. However, when they burst into the building, they find Carla Connor (Alison King) drinking alone after a powercut forced the restaurant to close. Jamie violently grabs Carla and pins her down on the floor, grabbing her hair viciously. Unbeknownst to Jamie and Carla, but Tracy Barlow (Kate Ford) is hiding in the kitchen, and decides to leave her arch-enemy Carla to the mercy of Jamie and Lee. Jamie is furious to discover that there is no money and that Steph is not there, so decide to take Carla's handbag, containing a ring that is important to her. After falling over, Carla gives chase, and scuffles with Jamie and Lee as their van drives off, dragging her along the street. Jamie then pushes Carla out of the moving vehicle, knocking her unconscious and leaving her in a critical condition. They do not stop as Pat Phelan (Connor McIntyre) and Kevin Webster (Michael Le Vell) cross the road, and are forced to leap out of the van's path. When Carla regains consciousness, she recalls to the police that Jamie was after Steph, and Steph informs the police again of Jamie's revenge porn of her. Carla and Steph are later relieved to hear that both Jamie and Lee have been imprisoned for the break in and attack on Carla.

== Johnny Connor ==
Johnny Connor
- Coronation Street character
- Portrayed by: Richard Hawley
- Duration: 2015–2021
- First appearance: Episode 8746; 5 October 2015
- Last appearance: Episode 1046; 22 October 2021 (appearance); Episode 1048; 25 October 2021 (voiceover)
- Introduced by: Stuart Blackburn
In-universe information
- Occupation: Businessman; Pub landlord
- Father: James Connor
- Wife: Lou Connor (backstory); Jenny Bradley (2017–2021)
- Sons: Aidan Connor
- Daughters: Carla Connor; Kate Connor
- Granddaughters: Susie Price
- Uncles: Rory Connor
- First cousins: Barry Connor
- Other relatives: Michelle Connor; Liam Connor; Paul Connor; Ali Neeson; Ryan Connor (adoptive); Liam Connor Jr. Ruairi McDonald

Johnny Connor, played by Richard Hawley, made his first screen appearance on 5 October 2015. The character was killed-off on 22 October 2021 after he drowns in a sinkhole trying to save his wife, Jenny Bradley (Sally Ann Matthews). The character and casting was announced on 20 July 2015. Johnny is Aidan (Shayne Ward) and Kate Connor's (Faye Brookes) father. He is a "self-made man" and a "ruthless businessman", who will clash with his son.

Johnny's daughter and Aidan's sister Kate turn up at the factory, where Johnny demands his money back. Carla Connor (Alison King) realises Aidan bought into the factory using his dad's money. Johnny tells Carla that he put his life savings into Aidan's bank account as a tax dodge and didn't know about the factory buy-out until just now. Carla gives the workers the day off to give the Connors time to sort out the mess. Carla no longer trusts Aidan as he stole from his own father. Johnny insists on getting his money back so that he can give Kate the wedding she deserves. Aidan asks why he doesn't use the rest of his money for it. Johnny admits it's all gone as his girlfriend cleaned him out. Johnny lays claim to Aidan's 40% share of the factory. Carla expects him to be a silent partner, but is surprised when he says otherwise.

The Underworld staff nervously await Johnny's arrival as their new boss. Johnny looks at the books and gives the factory three months before it goes out of business. Carla is forced to admit she had a gambling problem when he asks about the cash withdrawals amounting to £40,000. Carla, Aidan, Johnny and Kate discuss the factory over dinner in the bistro. Johnny confirms that he's on board with the factory on two conditions; that he's central to the running of the business and that they find a job for Kate.

Aidan introduces new working practices at the factory as Johnny and Kate begin work. Determined to make the best of things, Carla shows Johnny the order books. Kate tries to get round Johnny but Carla insists she makes her peace with Beth Sutherland (Lisa George), after fighting with her over her husband, Kirk (Andrew Whyment). Aidan arranges a meeting with a notoriously difficult client Matthew Singh (Peter Singh). Aidan doesn't tell Johnny about Singh but Kate lets it slip. Johnny brings the meeting forward to gazump Aidan, as Matthew is an old friend of his. Johnny meets Matthew Singh and discovers that the Matt he expected to meet was his father, who died three years ago. Johnny is out of his depth with Singh so Kate goes to fetch Aidan. Aidan considers not going to teach his dad a lesson. Johnny digs himself a deeper grave by trying to get teetotal Matthew Singh to drink. When Aidan arrives to rescue him, he puts his cards on the table and admits that he hijacked Aidan's meeting. Singh gives them a second chance. Aidan impresses Singh and he places an order.

Johnny orders cheaper material from a supplier friend of his to recoup some of the money Carla lost. Beth struggles with the cheap material. Johnny takes over her machine and forces the material through, breaking the needle. Work in the factory comes to a halt while Johnny repairs the machine. Aidan tells Eva Price (Catherine Tyldesley) she'll have to have an interview for the factory job. He's momentarily tongue-tied when he meets her and Kate and Johnny thinks he fancies her. With Tyrone Dobbs (Alan Halsall) held up, the Street fills with cars waiting for a service. Aidan and Johnny complain that their customers can't park outside the factory, and Kate almost descends into a physical fight with Sophie Webster (Brooke Vincent) over the situation.

Johnny is later shaken when he receives a visiting order from Carla's younger brother, Rob Donovan (Marc Baylis), who is serving time in prison for murder. When he visits him, Rob reveals that he is fully aware of Johnny's one-night stand with his and Carla's late mother Sharon, and knows that Johnny could potentially be Carla's father. Johnny begs Rob not to tell Carla, Aidan or Kate; however, Rob demands £10,000 for his silence.

In 2017, Johnny marries Jenny Bradley (Sally Ann Matthews). The following may, Johnny goes to Aidan's flat when he is late for work. There, Johnny discovers Aidan's suicide note and his body on the bathroom floor. Johnny is grief-stricken and falls apart, blaming Aidan's ex-girlfriend Eva Price (Catherine Tyldesley) for Aidan's suicide. Johnny wants custody for his baby granddaughter Susie but Eva wants to Susie to stay with her. Johnny also sleeps with Liz McDonald (Beverley Callard) after Johnny and Jenny experience problems. Events come to a head when Johnny kidnaps Susie and plans to run away to Spain with her. However, Liz convinces Johnny to give Susie back to Eva. Soon after Eva and Susie leave Coronation Street for France. Johnny and Jenny move on from Aidan's death by buying The Rovers Return from Peter Barlow (Chris Gascoyne) and Toyah Battersby (Georgia Taylor).

Scott Emberton (Tom Roberts), an old friend of Johnny arrives and it soon emerges they were responsible for burglary and GBH on security guard Grant Newsome several decades earlier. Grant later became an alcoholic and died of cirrhosis of the liver. Scott tries to blackmail Johnny and Johnny decides to confess and a siege at the pub ensues. Scott is arrested by armed police. In January 2021, following Johnny's confession, he is sentenced to 8 months imprisonment. However, Johnny serves half his sentence for good behaviour and surprises Jenny. He is shocked when Jenny confesses to sleeping with Ronnie Bailey (Vinta Morgan) while he was in prison. They split the following month, with Johnny selling his share of The Rovers Return.

In October 2021, Weatherfield launched their "Horror Nation Street" week of episodes with the promise of a beloved character dying as a result. In the episode that aired on 22 October 2021, Johnny dies from hypothermia and drowning after climbing into the Platts' sinkhole to try and save his wife, Jenny. Before dying, Johnny confessed his love for Jenny but it was too late. After hearing the distant voice of his son, Aidan, calling out to him; Johnny slipped under the water and was swept away as Jenny screams out to him.

== Kate Connor ==
Kate Connor
- Coronation Street character
- Portrayed by: Faye Brookes
- Duration: 2015–2019
- First appearance: Episode 8746; 5 October 2015
- Last appearance: Episode 9874; 13 September 2019
- Introduced by: Stuart Blackburn
In-universe information
- Occupation: Restaurant manager Barmaid; Waitress; Packer
- Father: Johnny Connor
- Mother: Lou Connor
- Stepmother: Jenny Bradley
- Brothers: Aidan Connor
- Half-sisters: Carla Connor
- Nieces: Susie Price
- Other relatives: Michelle Connor; Paul Connor; Liam Connor; Ali Neeson; Ryan Connor (adoptive); Ruairi McDonald; Liam Connor Jr.

Kate Connor, played by Faye Brookes, made her first screen appearance on 5 October 2015. The character and casting was announced on 20 July 2015. Kate is Aidan Connor's (Shayne Ward) sister, who arrives with their father Johnny (Richard Hawley). Kate is "a vibrant young woman full of fun and mischief". She was engaged to a soldier called Caz Hammond (Rhea Bailey). At The National Television Awards 2017, Brookes won "Best Newcomer" for her portrayal of Kate. In April 2019, Brookes revealed she had decided to leave the show after four years, and Kate left on 13 September 2019.

Kate turns up at the factory along with father Johnny. Johnny reveals that Aidan had stolen his money to buy into the factory, with Kate bemoaning her brother for thinking that he would get away with it. Kate shows her cousin Michelle Connor (Kym Marsh) her engagement ring. Johnny insists on getting his money back so that he can give Kate the wedding she deserves. Kate is unimpressed when she is told to work in packing with Kirk Sutherland (Andrew Whyment), while Aidan works in the office with Johnny and Carla Connor (Alison King). She jokingly flirts with Kirk in an attempt to frustrate his wife Beth (Lisa George), which leads to a physical fight between the two women. Kate later apologises to Beth and reveals that she is a lesbian, which Beth is secretly relieved about.

Later on, Kate finds out Carla is her half-sister and while Aidan is angry at Johnny for not telling them, Kate is not. Caz later comes to spend Christmas with Kate. Caz later comes back to Weatherfield after hurting her leg; however, Kate has become considerately close with Sophie Webster (Brooke Vincent) in her absence, causing Caz to be jealous of their friendship. After Kate calls off the wedding and kisses Sophie, Caz decides to leave and accidentally hits Kate; however, Kate insists they still continue their relationship but decides not to speak to Sophie. Luke Britton (Dean Fagan) later finds out Caz is faking her injury and in July 2016, Kate finds out this after Caz throws Kylie Platt's (Paula Lane) killer Clayton Hibbs and Macca Hibbs out of The Rovers Return Inn public house after Macca tries to take over the bar for himself, revealing she can run and walk fine, Caz lies to win Kate over but Luke and Sophie know she is faking her injury and Kate and Caz's relationship is later over. Caz leaves the street in December 2016 after trying to frame Maria Connor (Samia Longchambon) for "murdering" her.

In February 2017, Kate becomes a barmaid at Nick's Bistro. She becomes increasingly worried for Johnny when he begins losing his balance and is scared when he is diagnosed with multiple sclerosis, which he tells only Kate about. In September, Kate begins a relationship with Imogen Pascoe (Melissa Johns); however, they split after Kate isn't ready for a relationship and her friend Rana Nazir (Bhavna Limbachia) drunkenly kisses her admitting she has feelings for her, despite being straight and engaged to Zeedan Nazir (Qasim Akhtar). On Rana and Zeedan's wedding day, Kate leaves Rana a voicemail telling her she loves her; however, Rana goes ahead with the wedding, despite being confused about her sexuality and deletes the voicemail, making Kate distraught, which leads to her getting drunk at the wedding and causing a scene. The next day, Kate after trying to answer a phone call from Rana, knocks over her boss Robert Preston (Tristan Gemmill) with one of the restaurant vans, leaving him badly injured, afterwards, Kate tells Luke that she is in love with Rana. A few weeks later, Rana and Kate confess their love for each other and they passionately kiss, with Luke walking in on them both half-naked. Later on, Rana tells Kate that she will tell Zeedan about her feelings for her. While having a date in the bistro with Rana, there is a robbery, panicking Kate hits the robber over the head with a glass bottle. After running to Robert to tell him about the robbery, Kate runs into Michelle and noticing her with a large bag of cash, realizes she is the robber but doesn't mention it to Robert. Later on, Michelle visits Kate pretending to be innocent; however, Kate confronts her and so Michelle starts to blackmail her, that if she tells the police she had robbed the bistro, she will tell Zeedan that she and Rana are having an affair. Michelle and Kate later make up and Michelle starts letting Kate and Rana use her and Robert's flat for them to continue their affair; however, one night, Robert walks in on them together but agrees to keep the affair a secret. In January 2018, Rana confesses to Zeedan that she loves someone else but when he thinks she is in love with a man, Kate blurts it is her that Rana is in love with. After a while of Rana ignoring Kate, they kiss, which Zeedan walks into, after this, Rana tells Zeedan she is in love with Kate and they start a secret relationship.

In May 2018, Aidan kills himself, shocking Kate and the rest of the Connor family.

Later on in the year, Kate proposes to Rana at the same time as Rana proposes to her, which they both say yes to. The engagement is then called off when the two discuss having a child. Rana doesn't want a child, which ends up in them having a massive row and splitting up. Eventually, they got back together as a couple on New Year's Eve and got back to planning their wedding and life together.

In March 2019, Rana dies with Kate by her side on their ill-fated wedding day, after being trapped under the rubble in the Underworld factory collapse.

== Brendan Finch ==
Brendan Finch
- Coronation Street character
- Portrayed by: Ted Robbins
- Duration: 2015–2016
- First appearance: Episode 8761; 29 October 2015
- Last appearance: Episode 8828; 29 January 2016
- Introduced by: Stuart Blackburn
In-universe information
- Occupation: Magazine editor
- Brothers: Bernard Finch
- Wife: Bridget Finch

Brendan Finch, played by Ted Robbins, made his first appearance on 29 October 2015. The character and casting was announced in July 2015. Brendan comes in as a new love interest for Mary Taylor (Patti Clare).

Brendan, the editor of supernatural magazine The Inexplicable, calls in The Kabin with a batch of the latest edition. He berates Norris Cole (Malcolm Hebden) for his rude phone call to his assistant earlier. He and Mary are taken with each other. Mary swoons over Brendan telling him how she has every issue of The Inexplicable bar one. Brendan promises to try and track it down for her, as a carping Norris and Rita Tanner (Barbara Knox) roll their eyes. Brendan returns and hands Mary her missing copy of The Inexplicable. They agree to meet again. Norris mocks Mary's interest in the supernatural, and she accuses Norris of being jealous of her and Brendan's friendship. Brendan returns to The Kabin and invites Mary for a drink. Mary is thrilled, while Norris is irritated. Having already arranged to meet Mary in the pub, Dev Alahan (Jimmi Harkishin) is surprised when Brendan turns up and he leaves them to it. Brendan has Mary enthralled with tales of the supernatural. When his phone beeps, he says it's a message from his mother and he has to go. Mary is disappointed but they agree they will meet again.

Dev has reservations about Mary going off with Brendan to Butterthorne Hall. He's suspicious when Brendan asks Mary to leave her mobile behind as it could interfere with the spirits. At the hall, Brendan tells Mary to be a firm believer to conjure up the spirits. Mary and Brendan hear various noises in the supposedly deserted hall and a door bursts open, scaring them witless. It is Dev, who has come to check on them. Back in The Rovers, Dev apologises to Mary and Brendan for spoiling their day out. Mary tells Emily Bishop (Eileen Derbyshire) to mind her own business when she suggests that Brendan thinks of her only as a friend. Brendan bores everyone at The Rovers with his stories, but enthralls Mary. Brendan invites Mary to an Inexplicable convention. Mary is ready to accept when he casually mentions that his wife Bridget (Carol Harvey) wouldn't want to go. Mary is devastated that Brendan is married but puts on a brave face. Brendan takes Mary out on a date to a local pub, and when they return, the pair have sex. They begin a short-lived affair, until Bridget arrives at The Rovers and furiously slaps Mary in front of everybody and brands her a "scarlet woman", before Brendan arrives and denies all knowledge of Mary's accusations and believes she is stalking him. This devastates Mary, and knocks her confidence greatly.

Three years later in May 2019, Brendan's brother, Bernard (Larry Waller) arrives at The Kabin to inform Mary that Brendan has died.

== Nessa Warner ==
Nessa Warner
- Coronation Street character
- Portrayed by: Sadie Shimmin
- Duration: 2015–2016
- First appearance: Episode 8,761; 29 October 2015
- Last appearance: Episode 9,057; 15 December 2016
- Introduced by: Stuart Blackburn (2015); Kate Oates (2016)
In-universe information
- Occupation: Hair stylist
- Sisters: Cathy Matthews
- Sons: Alex Warner

Nessa Warner, played by Sadie Shimmin, made her first appearance on 29 October 2015. She is the sister of established character Cathy Matthews (Melanie Hill), and the mother of the soap opera's first Down's syndrome character, Alex Warner (Liam Bairstow). She has also become a love interest for the recently widowed Ken Barlow (William Roache), and embroiled in a love triangle as Audrey Roberts (Sue Nicholls) also competes for Ken's affections. After departing the show on 8 January 2016, it was announced in November that Nessa would return on 5 December 2016, for Cathy's wedding to Roy Cropper (David Neilson).

Nessa first arrives at the café panicking as her son, Alex, has gone missing. Cathy, her partner Roy and Ken all send out a search party for him, and he is later found in the local pub, The Rovers Return. Nessa takes a liking to Ken, and instantly decides she has feelings for him, unaware that he is still grieving for his late wife, Deirdre (Anne Kirkbride). Ken and Nessa eventually begin a lustful relationship, which upsets local resident Audrey as she has also developed feelings for Ken over the past weeks. Ken's adoptive daughter, Tracy (Kate Ford), is not impressed by Nessa's presence in the family and regularly insults her. Ken later convinces Audrey to give Nessa a job at her salon as a hair stylist, which Audrey is reluctant about but agrees to impress Ken. Audrey, however, is later frustrated by Nessa frequently taking breaks in the middle of shifts to go shopping for Ken, and often contemplates sacking her, but does not for Ken's sake. Many local residents begin to disapprove of Ken and Nessa's relationship, including Rita Tanner (Barbara Knox) and Emily Bishop (Eileen Derbyshire); however, Nessa is not concerned and attempts to change Ken's taste in clothes, which infuriates Tracy and Audrey. After the couple are invited to Nick Tilsley (Ben Price) and Carla Connor's (Alison King) engagement party, Nessa demands that Audrey styles her hair; however, Audrey styles it appallingly in revenge for getting with Ken before she could. Nessa is furious and upset, and she convinces Ken not to attend the party as she feels humiliated, upsetting Audrey.

Eventually, Ken begins to see how selfish Nessa is, especially when she makes a rude remark to Emily as she is departing Weatherfield. Nessa is later stunned when Roy confronts her about love letters that she and Cathy's late husband, Alan, sent to one another, and she fails to deny that they were having an affair. She begs Roy not to tell Cathy, and manages to manipulate him into driving her to Cathy's house and helping her dispose of the love letters. However, Cathy has already found them and angrily shouts at Nessa before throwing her out. When she returns home, Ken is appalled by the way Nessa sees herself as the victim in the situation. Nessa is desperate to make amends with Cathy, and feels awful to hear that she and Roy have split up because of her affair with Alan, so she becomes determined to repair their relationship. She accompanies Roy when he visits Cathy's house in an attempt to reconcile with her, however Nessa realises that the house is on fire so Roy enters and saves Cathy. Cathy is extremely hostile towards Nessa, after realising how intimate the affair between her and Alan was. When she returns to The Rovers, she breaks down to Ken about her broken relationship with Cathy, and Liz McDonald (Beverley Callard) encourages Ken to end things with Nessa if he is not happy. Ken subsequently dumps a distraught Nessa, and she apologises to Cathy once more before getting in her car and driving away. However, she comes across Audrey, and realising Audrey's hostility towards her was because she has feelings for Ken, Nessa informs her that she is welcome to him, before leaving Weatherfield in her car.

Nine months later, in September 2016, Cathy phones Nessa shortly after learning from Nigel, Nessa's ex-husband, that Alan is Alex's biological father. In early December 2016, Nessa returns to Weatherfield in preparation for Cathy's upcoming wedding to Roy, and Cathy's friend Yasmeen Nazir (Shelley King) cannot understand why Cathy has not confronted her over her having a child with Alan. Roy later sleepwalks into Nessa's bedroom, with Nessa teasing him to the other residents the following day, embarrassing both Roy and Cathy. She later bumps into Ken, who has recently suffered a stroke, and thoughtlessly states that she had a lucky escape from their relationship. Nessa later returns to Scotland.

== Caz Hammond ==
Caz Hammond
- Coronation Street character
- Portrayed by: Rhea Bailey
- Duration: 2015–2016
- First appearance: Episode 8773; 16 November 2015
- Last appearance: Episode 9047; 2 December 2016
- Introduced by: Stuart Blackburn
In-universe information
- Occupation: Soldier

Caz Hammond, played by Rhea Bailey, made her first appearance on 16 November 2015. The character and casting was announced in August 2015. Caz is Kate Connor's (Faye Brookes) fiancée. She arrived on Kate's 26th birthday. In February 2016, it was announced that Caz would be domestically abusing Kate when she gets jealous over her friendship with fellow lesbian, Sophie Webster (Brooke Vincent).

Caz first arrives at Underworld for Kate's 26th birthday and kisses her, who welcomes her to Weatherfield. She evidently gets on well with Kate's father Johnny (Richard Hawley) and brother Aidan Connor (Shayne Ward), and reveals to them and Kate that she has booked their wedding for April 2016. Kate is later shown to be apprehensive about marrying Caz, and confides in Sophie. She then leaves to return to the army. Caz returns in March 2016, ready for her wedding to Kate. However, when she arrives at Kate's flat to surprise her, she is stunned to find her kissing Sophie. She is furious and sparks a vicious feud with Sophie, but is further angered when Kate confesses that she is not ready to marry her. While Caz is packing her car up, she accidentally hits Kate, which is spotted by Sophie who defends her. Caz then leaves again for the army.

Kate receives a phonecall in May 2016 from the army, revealing that Caz has been injured in a parachuting accident and needs a place to stay to recuperate before returning to the army. She stays with Kate in her flat and the couple begin to rebuild their relationship, however Sophie continuously attempts to warn everybody that Caz is faking her injury. Luke Britton (Dean Fagan) later spots Caz threatening somebody over the phone, fuelling Sophie's belief that she is faking. She later overreacts when her ankle is hit by young Liam Connor Jr.'s (Charlie Wrenshall) toy car. Caz threatens Sophie in The Rovers Return Inn toilets when she continues to interfere in her and Kate's relationship, however when she spots Clayton Hibbs (Callum Harrison) making a pass at Kate, Caz violently attacks him, revealing that there is nothing wrong with her ankle. After a heated argument, Kate decides that Caz is scarily controlling and ends their relationship, devastating Caz.

Caz moves in with Kate's family friend, Maria Connor (Samia Longchambon), and her boyfriend, Luke. Luke attempts to make Caz's life difficult after upsetting Sophie, however Maria eventually ends her relationship with Luke after she has a one-night stand with Aidan. After a while, Caz develops an unhealthy obsession with Maria, and is crushed when she asks her to move out. Caz ensures that Maria notices her sleeping rough on a park bench, and later hires an intimidating man to burgle Maria's flat to show her that Caz will provide her with protection. The plan backfires, however, when Maria is attacked and injured by the man. When Liam finds his deceased father, Liam Connor's (Rob James-Collier) watch in Caz's belongings, Maria confronts her, with Caz lying that she found it on the street after the burglar stole it. Eventually, Caz kisses Maria, with Maria unsure of how to take it. Caz later overhears Maria teasing her to Audrey Roberts (Sue Nicholls) about the kiss, with her preparing to leave Weatherfield again. Maria desperately stops her, however, after Caz repeatedly calls Maria's flat from her mobile phone in an attempt to frighten her.

After Maria leaves Weatherfield for London to sort out issues in her sham marriage to an immigrant, Caz informs Tyrone Dobbs (Alan Halsall) that Maria has been sending her threatening text messages and has been violent towards her in the past. She also hints at a reconciliation with Kate, before vanishing without a trace. When Maria returns to her flat, she finds it has been over-turned, and so calls Aidan for help. However, she is stunned to find blood stained on the wall. She calls the police, who bring a forensic team and confirm that the blood is Caz's. Fiz Stape (Jennie McAlpine) later finds a rug in her bins also covered in blood, and contacts the police, and the blood is also revealed to be Caz's. Fiz and Tyrone then inform the police of how Maria impersonated Tyrone's abusive ex-fiancée Kirsty Soames (Natalie Gumede) in order to reconcile with Tyrone, which leads the police to believe that Maria has murdered Caz.

Maria endures months under suspicion of killing Caz, and Kate becomes hostile with Aidan when he defends her. Aidan stops over at Maria's flat to make her feel safe, however they are unaware that Caz has planted a camera in the flat and is watching their every move. The following day, Caz returns to Maria's flat and stabs herself with Maria's hairdressing scissors, and when Maria and Aidan later find them, Aidan hides them in the bin at Underworld. Johnny and Jenny Bradley (Sally Ann Matthews) later find the scissors in the bin, and the police arrest Maria on suspicion of murder. Aidan is desperate to prove Maria's innocence, as she is remanded in custody. While on a meeting, Aidan notices Caz working in a factory nearby, and so questions the factory manager. He notices Caz rushing through the fire escape, however when he chases her, he loses sight of her. The police warn Aidan to stop interfering in the investigation. The following day, Kate is delighted to hear that Caz is still alive, and declares her love for her to Aidan, who leaves in fury. Watching Kate's actions on the planted camera, Caz rushes to Maria's flat to reconcile with a stunned Kate. They declare their love for one another, however Kate contacts Aidan for help. Kate confesses what she has done, leading to Caz violently grabbing Kate's hair and threatening her before attempting to flee, however she is caught by Aidan. The police then arrive and arrest Caz, who stares furiously at Aidan and Kate before being taken away by the police.

== Richie O'Driscoll ==
Richie O'Driscoll
- Coronation Street character
- Portrayed by: James Midgley
- Duration: 2015–2016
- First appearance: Episode 8804; 28 December 2015
- Last appearance: Episode 8863; 18 March 2016
- Introduced by: Stuart Blackburn
In-universe information
- Occupation: Clothing retailer
- Wife: Julia O'Driscoll

Richie O'Driscoll, played by James Midgley, was the owner of O'Driscoll's clothing company, who Aidan Connor (Shayne Ward) had hoped to sign a contract with Underworld, but was later revealed to be a modern slaver as Aidan's girlfriend Eva Price (Catherine Tyldesley) found a young girl named Marta Zarek (Edyta Budnik) who was living in the factory which was absconded by Richie and his wife Julia O'Driscoll (Malgorzata Klara). After a fight broke out between the O'Driscolls and Aidan and Eva, they were all arrested, but the O'Driscolls were charged for offences under section 1 of the Modern Slavery Act 2015. Marta then returned to Poland.

The O'Driscolls were introduced as part of a modern slavery storyline. Mark Jefferies of the Daily Mirror reported that producers consulted experts to ensure the storyline would be accurate. A spokesperson commented, "Obviously, Coronation Street tries to tackle difficult subjects and has done storylines about serious illnesses and violence before. But this is the first time slavery has appeared."

== Julia O'Driscoll ==
Julia O'Driscoll
- Coronation Street character
- Portrayed by: Malgorzata Klara
- Duration: 2015–2016
- First appearance: Episode 8804; 28 December 2015
- Last appearance: Episode 8863; 18 March 2016
- Introduced by: Stuart Blackburn
In-universe information
- Husband: Richie O'Driscoll

Julia O'Driscoll, played by Malgorzata Klara, was the Polish wife of Richie O'Driscoll (James Midgley), owner of O'Driscoll's clothing company, who Aidan Connor (Shayne Ward) had hoped to sign a contract with Underworld, but was later revealed to be a modern slaver as Aidan's girlfriend Eva Price (Catherine Tyldesley) found a young girl named Marta Zarek (Edyta Budnik) who was living in the factory which was absconded by the O'Driscolls. After a fight broke out between the O'Driscolls and Aidan and Eva, they were all arrested, but the O'Driscolls were charged for offences under section 1 of the Modern Slavery Act 2015. Marta then returned to Poland.

The O'Driscolls are introduced as part of a modern slavery storyline. Mark Jefferies of the Daily Mirror reported that producers consulted experts to ensure the storyline would be accurate. A spokesperson commented, "Obviously, Coronation Street tries to tackle difficult subjects and has done storylines about serious illnesses and violence before. But this is the first time slavery has appeared."

== Other characters ==
Character	Date(s)	Actor	Circumstances
Therapist	30 January – 4 February	Philip Martin Brown	Steve McDonald (Simon Gregson) visits the therapist when he has depression.
Tara	2 February	Anna Bolton	Tara delivers flowers to the Bistro and notices her ex-boyfriend Andy Carver (Oliver Farnworth). He offers to help move the flowers in a bid to get rid of her quickly. Tara attempts to reconcile with Andy, but he tells her is dating someone else. Tara kisses him and tells him to call her sometime.
Sam Hayden	20 February – 27 April	Peter Mitchell	Sam is a Northern Irish friend of Sinead Tinker (Katie McGlynn) who she meets in hospital following a minibus accident.
Susan Meldrum	23 March	Meriel Scholfield	Susan is Gavin Rodwell's (Mark Holgate) mother and Michael Rodwell's (Les Dennis) ex-wife. She meets with Michael's fiancée, Gail McIntyre (Helen Worth), at Gavin's funeral, revealing that she wishes to reconnect with Michael, however, Gail lies and says that Michael is in hospital following a heart attack, when she is really covering for Andy Carver (Oliver Farnworth), who is pretending to be Gavin.
Talisa Grady	12–29 June	Samantha Power	Talisa is a friend of Dev Alahan (Jimmi Harkishin) whom he met when on his trip to India. She comes to stay at Dev's house after her marriage breaks down. Dev's girlfriend Julie Carp (Katy Cavanagh) overhears Dev saying that he has fallen in love with Talisa, which causes Julie to split up with him. Talisa rejected Dev as she later announces she is gay.
Julie Carp	29 June	Emma Keele	A woman found online by Tracy Barlow (Kate Ford) to trick Brian Packham (Peter Gunn) into thinking he was meeting his ex-partner, Julie Carp (Katy Cavanagh).
Denton	13 September	Ian Peck	A drug dealer who supplied Callum Logan (Sean Ward) and was one of few that intimidated him.
