= Kirk Sutherland =

Fictional character from Coronation Street

- Coronation Street character
- Portrayed by: Uncredited actor (2000); Andy Whyment (2000–present)
- Duration: 2000–present
- First appearance: 22 May 2000
- Introduced by: Jane MacNaught
- Book appearances: Coronation Street: The Complete Saga (2008)
- Spin-off appearances: Coronation Street: Out of Africa (2008); Coronation Street: Text Santa Special (2013, 2015); What Would Kirk Do? (2014–2015)
In-universe information
- Occupation: Kennel Master; Businessman; Butcher; Courier; Packer
- Father: Eric Sutherland
- Mother: Dot Sutherland
- Sisters: Maria Connor
- Wife: Beth Tinker (2015; void)
- Stepsons: Craig Tinker
- Aunts: Ruby
- Nephews: Paul Connor Jr. Liam Connor Jr.
- First cousins: Denise

Kirk Sutherland (also known as Mark) is a fictional character from the British ITV soap opera Coronation Street. The character first appeared on-screen as "Mark" during the episode airing on 22 May 2000, played by an uncredited walk-on actor. He was renamed Kirk and has been played by Andy Whyment since October 2000.

== Casting ==
Whyment resigned from Coronation Street in September 2003 in order to appear in the latest addition to the Carry On series, Carry On London. However, after the film's scripts were delayed and amidst rumors that it would perform poorly, Whyment pulled out and returned to Coronation Street in a £60,000 deal. In 2012, Whyment said that he was committed to staying with Coronation Street. As he was in his eleventh year of playing the role and it remained "great," he hoped it would be "a job for life."

== Development ==
In 2013, it was announced that Kirk would start a romance with Beth Tinker (Lisa George). Their relationship begins when Kirk rescues Beth from a date and becomes aggressive with her. Talking about the romance, Lisa George said, "Usually the viewers only see Beth as the really gobby person in the factory. But there are some really nice, tender little moments in this storyline, and Beth is quite open and honest with Kirk. I think it's really nice that the audience will get to see that."

== Storylines ==
Kirk first appears when Tyrone Dobbs (Alan Halsall) mistakenly believes that he is Maria Sutherland's (Samia Ghadie) boyfriend. Maria explains that Kirk is her brother and co-owner of Weatherfield Kennels. Kirk becomes good friends with Tyrone and Jason Grimshaw (Ryan Thomas) and starts dating Fiz Brown (Jennie McAlpine), whom he met at a flat-decorating party. He becomes also friends with Les Battersby (Bruce Jones) acting as best man at his wedding and living with him at some point. Kirk loses the kennels following a lawsuit over the accidental neutering of a pedigree specimen and proposes to Fiz, but she breaks up with him to be with her first love, John Stape (Graeme Hawley), leaving Kirk feeling broken and humiliated.

After Fiz' mother and Les' wife Cilla Battersby-Brown (Wendi Peters) leaves the street for Las Vegas, Kirk is left to look after her son, Chesney (Sam Aston). Kirk fails to provide adequate care for Chesney, and he is subsequently taken into foster care. When Fiz returns from a holiday, she is furious but forgives Kirk. She manages to get Chesney home, but she has to move in with them, making Kirk believe she still has feelings for him. Kirk leaves to visit his parents in Cyprus for several weeks. Fiz dreads him coming home while she is providing a home for Chesney. On his return, he reveals that he has a new girlfriend called Julie Carp (Katy Cavanagh), whom he fell in love with in Cyprus. Kirk moves out of the flat as he feels he is in the way of Fiz's life. He moves between Maria's, and Tyrone and Molly Dobbs's (Vicky Binns). Kirk applies for a job at Underworld as a machinist, but loses out to Izzy Armstrong (Cherylee Houston). However, owner Carla Connor (Alison King) offers him a job as a delivery driver. Kirk soon forms a strong friendship with Izzy and develops feelings for her. When Gary Windass (Mikey North) is arrested for assaulting a man who was hassling Izzy, Kirk makes a false statement to the police that it was he who committed the crime. Gary, Kirk, Tommy Duckworth (Chris Fountain) and Tyrone later abduct Leon Southam (Colin Parry), whose girlfriend, Ruth Walsh (Rebecca Callard), has been bullying Fiz in prison, which leads to Leon going back to prison.

Later, Kirk is put in charge of helping colleague Michelle's son Ryan Connor (Sol Heras) in the packing department at Underworld, as Michelle is punishing Ryan for an incident involving setting fire to Steve McDonald's (Simon Gregson) house. While left alone, Ryan takes advantage and fakes a severe injury in order to take time off. Michelle and Rob Donovan (Marc Baylis) take Ryan to the hospital, but no injuries are shown. However, later, Ryan announces that he plans to sue Underworld. Months later, Kirk meets Beth Tinker (Lisa George) and begins a relationship with her. Kirk and Beth get married in an 1980s-themed wedding and then spend the night together at a posh hotel as a wedding gift from Carla. In the next year, Kirk accompanies Beth to her school reunion, in which Beth insults Kirk in front of an old school rival. Kirk then moves in with Norris Cole (Malcolm Hebden). Norris is lonely; they become close as they spend several evenings playing board games. Beth eventually wins Kirk back in a plan set up by Chesney and his girlfriend Sinead.

== Reception ==
For his portrayal of Kirk, Whyment was awarded "Best Comedy Performance" at the 2003 British Soap Awards. He won the award for the funniest character at the 2004 Inside Soap Awards. Whyment was also nominated for "Funniest Performance" at the 2007 Inside Soap Awards. Laura Morgan of All About Soap wrote that she "simply could not imagine" Coronation Street without Kirk and his "gormless grin." In 2004, Ian Hyland of the Sunday Mirror questioned whether there was a "better comic actor in Britain today than Andrew Whyment." Kirk and Beth's wedding was described as "possibly the tackiest event in soap all year" in the Inside Soap Yearbook 2016.
