= Beth Tinker =

Fictional character from Coronation Street

- Coronation Street character
- Portrayed by: Lisa George
- Duration: 2011–2024
- First appearance: 5 August 2011
- Last appearance: 30 August 2024
- Introduced by: Phil Collinson
- Spin-off appearances: What Would Kirk Do? (2014–2015)
In-universe information
- Other names: Beth Sutherland
- Occupation: Machinist
- Father: Bill
- Mother: Nancy Tinker
- Half-sisters: Arlene Tinker
- Husband: Darryl Perkins; Kirk Sutherland (2015; void)
- Sons: Craig Tinker
- Grandmothers: Agnes Tinker
- Uncles: Stan Tinker
- Nieces: Sinead Tinker
- First cousins: Tammy Tinker
- Other relatives: Bertie Osbourne

Beth Tinker (also Sutherland) is a fictional character from the British ITV soap opera Coronation Street, played by Lisa George. She made her first screen appearance during the episode broadcast on 5 August 2011. In 2023, it was announced that George had quit the role and would be departing in 2024 making her final appearance on 30 August.

== Casting ==
The character and George's casting was announced on 4 August 2011. The actress told a writer for the Grimsby Telegraph that the role of Beth came up while she was touring nursing homes in Glasgow with her musical act. George said: "I was delighted they asked me to audition for the role as I saw a lot of friendly faces again, who I have worked with before." George appeared in Coronation Street three times before her latest stint as Beth. Beth initially appears as Steve McDonald's (Simon Gregson) "nightmare date" for two episodes. On 10 October 2011, itv.com announced Beth would be returning to Coronation Street. They added Beth would be joining Underworld as a machinist and getting involved in some of the dramas at the factory. In January 2012, Beth and her colleague, Eileen Grimshaw (Sue Cleaver), spot Frank Foster (Andrew Lancel) kissing Sally Webster (Sally Dynevor) at the factory. Of this, Daniel Kilkelly of Digital Spy said: "With gobby Beth knowing the truth, it doesn't take long before Sally and Frank's romance is the talk of the street..." Beth first appeared on-screen during the episode broadcast 5 August 2011. In February 2014, George confirmed her commitment to continue appearing in the show as she enjoyed being part of the show's creativity.

== Development ==
Speaking about her character, George described her as "coming across as gobby and harsh." Beth often gets into arguments with her work friends, in particular Sally Webster (Sally Dynevor) and Eva Price (Catherine Tyldesley). George commented on her character's similarities with Cilla Battersby-Brown, who was played by Wendi Peters, saying "I don't want Beth to be like Cilla at all, I admit that I do look a bit like her, and I have been compared to her in the past when I've done other things like panto. But I don't think that Beth is as callous as Cilla was. Cilla didn't care for her kids, but Beth is really soft." George hoped viewers would see that Beth is very different from Cilla. Beth often says things that are controversial, often due to her habit of not thinking things through before she says them. George noted that Beth was funny and that viewers liked this aspect of her character. She added "I think people like that she's so loud and she says things that aren't very PC!"

In 2013, it was announced that Beth would start a romance with Kirk Sutherland (Andrew Whyment). Their relationship begins when Kirk rescues Beth from a date who becomes aggressive with her. Talking about the romance, George said: "Usually the viewers only see Beth as the really gobby person in the factory. But there are some really nice, tender little moments in this storyline, and Beth is quite open and honest with Kirk. I think it's really nice that the audience will get to see that."

In December 2023, it was reported that George had quit her role as Beth after 13 years, and Beth departed on 30 August 2024.

== Storylines ==
Beth previously dated Steve McDonald (Simon Gregson) in 2000 and eleven years later Steve contacts Beth to arrange a date. Beth brings her son, Craig (Colson Smith), and Steve is surprised that she no longer looks like a model. Beth argues with Steve's ex-wife, Becky McDonald (Katherine Kelly). Beth later applies for a machinists job at Frank Foster's (Andrew Lancel) factory. She is hired, despite reservations from Frank's mother, Anne Foster (Gwen Taylor). Beth reveals that she is still in love with Steve and she clashes with his fiancée Tracy Barlow (Kate Ford). When Steve ends his relationship with Tracy, he invites Beth and Craig to move in with her. Beth and Tracy initially do not get on, but they team up to put buyers off the house when Steve decides to sell it. Beth and Craig later move into the flat above Barlow's Bookies and when Beth begins dating Kirk Sutherland (Andrew Whyment), they move into the flat above the garage with him.

Craig behaves differently and Beth suspects something is bothering him. She becomes concerned when he drinks vodka and truants from school. Beth is unaware that Craig believes he caused the fire at The Rovers with a cigarette. The real arsonist, Karl Munro (John Michie), manipulates Craig into secrecy. Karl later threatens to murder Beth, causing Craig to tell the truth. Beth convinces Craig to make a police statement resulting in Karl's arrest. This leaves Beth questioning her status as a mother. To make amends, Beth tries to win the "Employee of the Month" award at Underworld to buy Craig extra Christmas presents. She gets Sinead Tinker (Katie McGlynn) to help her sew. When the boss, Carla Connor (Alison King), finds out she has cheated, she initially sacks Beth, but soon reinstates her. Kirk is upset with Beth's dishonesty but tolerates it. Beth gets is fired once more and she struggles to pay rent. Sinead lets Beth, Craig, and Kirk move into number 5 with herself and boyfriend Chesney Brown (Sam Aston), which Chesney owns half of. The other half of the house is owned by Chesney's sister Fiz Stape (Jennie McAlpine), who has recently moved out and Kirk buys her out of the place.

Beth starts to believe that Kirk has gone off her and is not interested in her any more. Beth starts questioning Kirk about if he is interested in her any more, Kirk says he is and that he loves Beth. Kirk then plans to propose to Beth but he could never find the right time nor moment too. He plans to cook Beth a romantic meal but ends up not reading the recipe right and adds to many spices and herbs, therefore not succeeding in proposing to Beth. Beth and Kirk later go and get a take away from the kebab shop, Kirk hides the ring in the kebab. Beth later starts saying she needs to lose weight and throws the kebab in the bin, not knowing the ring was inside it. Kirk then goes mad and starts to shout saying that he was going to propose and the ring was in the kebab, he and Beth then start rummaging through the bin and later find it. Kirk then proposes in front of several of the street residents. Tracy starts to brag about her "dream wedding" so Beth then decides that she wants to upstage her. Kirk and Beth then start to work extra shifts at the factory, they begin to become tired and strained, but continue to work long hours to fuel their own "dream wedding". Sinead then persuades Beth and Kirk that they can have just as perfect a wedding, but cheaper, they later agree. After Tracy's wedding to Rob Donovan (Marc Baylis) ends in disaster, Beth begins to try to cheer her up and keep her company, Beth and Tracy later begin to open wedding presents from guests and reminisce on Rob and the wedding that did not happen. When Fiz and Chesney's mother, Cilla Battersby-Brown (Wendi Peters), later returns to the street, she clashes with Beth.

Beth and Kirk arrange to marry in January 2015. Beth's mother Nancy Tinker (Kate Fitzgerald), her sister and Sinead's mother Arlene Tinker (Alison Burrows) and her grandmother Agnes Tinker (Juliette Kaplan) all arrive for the 80's themed wedding, however Kirk is devastated when he hears the family disrespecting him behind his back. He contemplates not turning up to the wedding, believing that Beth deserves better, however, he is persuaded by Chesney, and he and Beth get married. Beth then supports Sinead through her recovery from temporary paralysis. Beth goes on a camping trip with family and friends, she has an allergic reaction from an insect bite.

Beth is horrified to learn that Craig has been keeping in touch with his father Darryl Perkins (Paul Loughran) who is in prison and Darryl reveals to Craig that Beth is still married to him; making her a bigamist. Beth is then later arrested at work and later accuses Kirk of reporting her to the police. However, Craig confesses that it was him and he insults Beth, calling her a liar and a hypocrite.

== Reception ==
For her portrayal of Beth, George received a nomination for Best Newcomer at the 2012 Inside Soap Awards. She was also nominated in the same category at the 2012 TV Choice Awards. Beth and Kirk's wedding was described as "possibly the tackiest event in soap all year" in the Inside Soap Yearbook 2016.
