= Julie Carp =

Fictional character from Coronation Street

- Coronation Street character
- Portrayed by: Katy Cavanagh
- Duration: 2008–2015, 2025
- First appearance: 25 April 2008; Episode 6804
- Last appearance: 5 May 2025; Episode 11556
- Introduced by: Kim Crowther (2008); Kate Brooks (2025)
- Spin-off appearances: Tram Crash News Flash (2010)
In-universe information
- Other names: Julie Jones; Julie Marie Carp
- Occupation: Machinist
- Father: Colin Grimshaw
- Mother: Paula Carp
- Half-sisters: Eileen Grimshaw
- Husband: Tim Jones (backstory)
- Grandfathers: Arnley Grimshaw
- Nephews: Jason Grimshaw; Todd Grimshaw
- Other relatives: Elsie Tanner; Dennis Tanner; Linda Cheveski

Julie Carp is a fictional character from the British ITV soap opera Coronation Street, played by Katy Cavanagh. The character debuted on-screen during the episode airing on 25 April 2008 and was originally introduced as a new girlfriend of established character Kirk Sutherland (Andy Whyment) and in a later storyline she was revealed to be Eileen Grimshaw's (Sue Cleaver) half-sister. On 4 February 2015, it was announced that Cavanagh had decided not to renew her contract with the show in order to go and pursue other projects. She departed on 3 July 2015. In January 2025, it was announced that Cavanagh would be reprising the role to accommodate the departure of Eileen. She made her return on 19 February 2025. The character made her final appearance on 5 May 2025.

== Development ==
=== Introduction ===
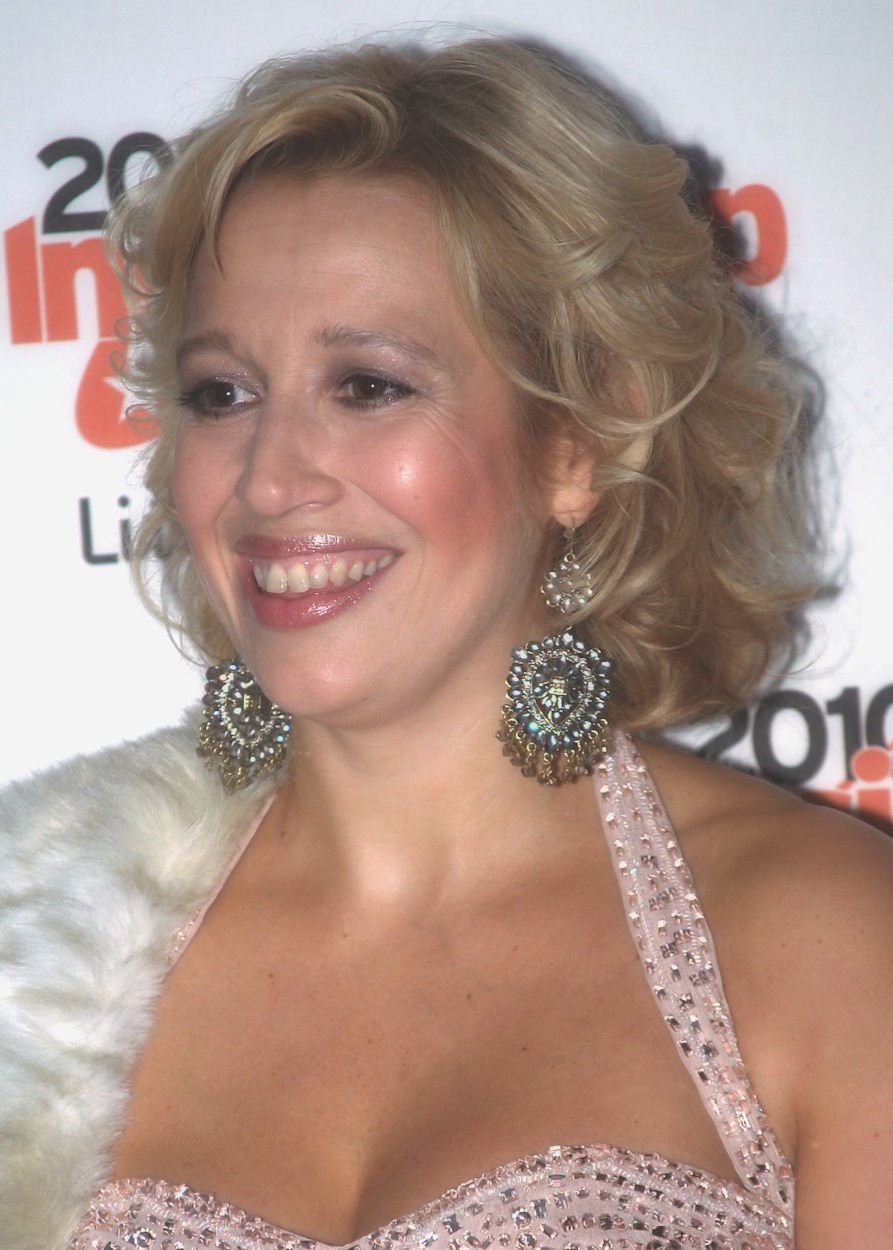
Katy Cavanagh (pictured) was cast to play Julie, who was created as a love interest for Kirk Sutherland (Andy Whyment).

The character of Julie Carp was initially introduced as love interest of established character Kirk Sutherland (Andy Whyment). Julie became a "permanent fixture" in the serial and was soon developed into the roles of a machinist and later a supervisor at the Underworld factory. In another storyline Julie has a pregnancy scare. In an "emotional" episode Kirk finds her pregnancy test with Julie under the impression that she was pregnant. A spokesperson for Coronation Street said that Kirk would have been one of the show's most unlikely fathers and would have doted on their child.

In 2009 producers decided to put Julie at the forefront of storylines. They separated her from Kirk and cast Sharon Duce to play her mother Paula Carp; who was introduced on a temporary basis to accommodate one particular storyline. Coronation Street's producer Kim Crowther had previously told Kris Green of Digital Spy of her intentions to implement a storyline which would connect the characters of Julie, Eileen Grimshaw (Sue Cleaver) and Rita Tanner (Barbara Knox).

=== Characterisation ===
During an interview with media website Digital Spy, Cavanagh spoke about the rise of her character into the main storylines during 2009, providing further insight into how her character's personality was panning out, stating: "It's taken me a year but I've been quite lucky because I crept in at the back and pottered around for a bit, finding my feet. I was definitely ready to get my teeth into something. I'm so chuffed with it. I've loved it. It's nice to show a different side to Julie and discover what's behind her slightly manic positivity." During the same interview she also commented on her character being a lonely woman because of all the events of the past year.

In mid-2009, Cavanagh spoke about her character in more depth, saying: "Three words to describe Julie – sparkly, romantic and sagacious", going on to say "I don't think anything irritates me about Julie, erm, I couldn't play her if anything irritated me, she does talk a lot so sometimes I'm completely knackered by the end of the day of playing Julie and I just want to go home and moan for an hour" and also that "My favourite quality about Julie is her sense of kind of fun and her irrepressible kind of joy, I love playing that".

=== Relationships ===
The Daily Star later ran a story revealing that Jason's grandfather, Colin Grimshaw (Edward de Souza), is Julie's biological father. Julie and Jason get drunk together after both splitting from their partners and Julie accompanies Jason back to his home where the situation becomes passionate. A spokesperson said that they do not realise they are doing any harm because they are "both adults and both single". The revelation of Julie's paternity leaves the pair "horrified" and "rocked to the core". They also said that "Colin confesses to gob-smacked drinkers in the Rovers Return that he took advantage of daughter Eileen’s 14-year-old school pal Paula Carp and got her pregnant." The publication's columnist stated that they knew whether or not Julie and Jason had sex, but Coronation Street wanted to keep it a secret until transmission.

Crowther told Green that they planned to keep Julie involved in Eileen's storylines. She added that Julie wants to be part of the Grimshaw family and "she's not going to let Eileen forget it".

Commenting on the character's keen attitude towards not being single actress Katy Cavanagh said: "She's lonely and I'm sure she'd rip the head off of any man that comes within five miles of her." Going on to say that although her character was no longer with Kirk Sutherland she also commented on their closeness and the fact they still live together so it is like nothing has changed.

=== Pregnancy ===
In January 2012, it was announced that Julie was to fall pregnant later in the year. The baby is suspected to be her partner Brian Packham's (Peter Gunn) but he is convinced that Julie cheated on him. Canavagh predicted that it will be "chaotic" when Julie becomes a mother. In an interview with Inside Soap, Cavanagh commented: "Julie will be ridiculous. She'll take everything people tell her literally. It will drive her sister Eileen absolutely mad. Julie will work hard at being a mum, but it'll be quite chaotic. She'll probably end up leaving the child in the supermarket! She'll adore her baby, though – it won't be left wanting in the love department." Brian initially wonders whether the baby is his as he had a vasectomy some time ago and failed to tell Julie. Cavanagh commented "She and Brian have been talking loads about having a child together, and he's seemed really into the idea. The viewers may have been aware that he's been looking a little bit shifty about the whole thing – but Julie hasn't noticed that anything's wrong."

After discovering that Julie is pregnant, Brian accuses her of having an affair because he has had a vasectomy. While speaking on This Morning, Cavanagh revealed her character is unaware of why Brian is not as excited about the pregnancy as she is. The actress said "Obviously they've been trying extremely hard to make babies! It's going to completely knock her for six." The couple visit Matt Carter (Oliver Mellor) at the medical centre looking for an explanation. Doctor Carter reveals that a vasectomy is not always 100% effective. When asked if Julie would forgive Brian, Cavanagh quipped "It's all going to come alright in the end, but Brian's really hurt her." The actress added that Julie has "a lovely goldfish kind of memory".

It was later announced that Julie would have a problematic pregnancy. Cavanagh told Alison Slade from TVTimes that having a baby is "the only thing that really matters" to Julie as it is "the biggest thing in her life". The character's issues develop when she attends her twelve-week scan. A Coronation Street representative told Laura Jayne-Tyler from Inside Soap that Julie and Brian are "quite nervous" prior to the scan but "bubbling over with excitement" about seeing their baby. When the scan takes place, Julie's nurse calls in a consultant and they run some tests. Julie is later told some "terrible news" about her pregnancy that requires emergency treatment. The representative added that Julie is "crumbling inside" and she attempts to keep a "brave face" – but the prognosis that she has been given "is simply unimaginable to her". While Brian acts as Julie's "tower of strength" throughout her ordeal.

=== Departure ===
On 4 February 2015, it was announced that Cavanagh had decided to leave Coronation Street. She revealed that she wanted to secure other roles and would be willing to return to the show in the future. Julie's exit story saw her leave Weatherfield following the breakdown of her relationship with Dev Alahan (Jimmi Harkishin). Peter Gunn returned to the show as Brian in the build-up to her exit. Her final episode aired on 3 July 2015.

=== Return and final departure ===
On 8 January 2025, it was announced that Cavanagh had reprised the role for a guest stint. She had already begun filming and Julie will appear again from February 2025. Julie's return was created to facilitate Eileen's departure storyline following Cleaver's decision to leave the show. Of her return, Cavanagh stated "It is exciting to dust off Julie's quirky wardrobe again and an absolute joy to step back onto the cobbles". The show's producer, Kate Brooks added her delight to have "the inimitable" and "lovable" character back in the series. She praised Cavanagh for resuming the role so effortlessly, noting it seemed like she had never left. Brooks warned that despite it being "a story full of love, laughter and tears", Julie also has a secret that has "huge ramifications for Eileen."

Writers planned a terminal illness storyline for Julie's return, but did not publicise it until the reveal episode was broadcast. Julie returns in scenes featuring Todd after they see each other at a hotel. After her return it becomes apparent Julie is hiding a secret. She later confides in Todd and George Shuttleworth (Tony Maudsley) that she has terminal cancer, revealing that she was diagnosed with sarcoma that originated in her stomach. She adds that the cancer has advanced to stage IV, having spread to her liver and lungs. Julie states that she will not live past summer 2025, and asks Todd and George to keep her illness a secret from Eileen. The character will be killed off on 5 May 2025.

== Storylines ==
Julie begins a relationship with Kirk Sutherland (Andy Whyment) and begins working at Underworld. Eileen strikes up a conversation with Julie when they both ran outside after Maria Connor (Samia Ghadie) crashed her car into Underworld. Julie says that she is getting fed up of her partner, Kirk, because he is unemployed and not doing anything about it. Julie's boss, Tony Gordon (Gray O'Brien), puts her in an awkward position at work, insisting she sack one of the seamstresses, who is also her friends but as supervisor, Tony feels it is necessary to step up to her role more effectively. Tony carries on bullying Julie to sack one of her friends until she stands up for herself but Tony threatens to sack her unless she does the task in hand. She is saved by newcomer Luke Strong (Craig Kelly) who tells her that her job was safe and undermines Tony.

Following a pregnancy scare, Julie tells Hayley Cropper (Julie Hesmondhalgh) that she needs a real man and dumps Kirk. Eileen Grimshaw (Sue Cleaver) pesters Julie by asking about her mother, Paula (Sharon Duce), because they were friends at school. Following her split from Kirk, Julie begins to show an interest in Eileen's son, Jason (Ryan Thomas). The pair get drunk in The Rovers and head back to Jason's house where they have sex, unaware that they are related. At Colin's 70th party at The Rovers a few days later, Paula comes in drunk, urging Julie to stop seeing Jason as Eileen is her half-sister. A few days later, Julie is horrified to discover that Colin has had a stroke. Determined to get to know her father, she visits him in hospital. When he dies of a heart attack, she is distraught and devastated that she didn't have a chance to know him.

Julie starts to work with Eileen's boyfriend, Jesse Chadwick (John Thomson), in child entertainment venues but when Eileen finds out, she forbids him to see Julie, even though they briefly still work together secretly before calling it quits. After Eileen and Jesse's relationship comes under strain, Jesse kisses Julie, saying he has feelings for her. A guilty Julie tells Eileen and the sisters chase him out of The Rovers and away from the Street. Julie and Eileen bond and promise to make a fresh start on their newfound relationship. Julie meets Brian Packham (Peter Gunn) and both are instantly smitten. Fiz Stape's (Jennie McAlpine) husband John (Graeme Hawley) worries that Brian will uncover his identity fraud. They inform Brian's wife, who then interrupts Julie and Brian's date, telling Julie that she is still married to Brian. John and Fiz then tell Brian's wife that Julie is mentally unstable and harassing Brian. She decides to take Brian back, breaking Julie's heart. Julie helps Eileen break in Owen Armstrong's (Ian Puleston-Davies) building yard to obtain his fixed accounts and document so they can use them to stop Owen threatening Eileen who paid a £10,000 cheque meant for Owen into her own account.

Julie and Eileen discover that they are related to Dennis Tanner (Philip Lowrie) as his mother, Elsie (Pat Phoenix), was a first cousin of their paternal grandfather, Arnley Grimshaw. When John's secrets are revealed, Julie decides that she wants to see Brian again. While on a date, Julie gets drunk and accuses Brian of flirting with Eva Price (Catherine Tyldesley). Despite their following encounters also being awkward, Dennis and Eileen force the pair to talk and they begin a relationship. Julie becomes pregnant but Brian had a vasectomy and suspects Julie of having an affair. Tests reveal that Julie is not pregnant and a growth caused the positive pregnancy test. Julie has to have her ovaries removed, leaving her unable to have children. Julie later becomes friends with Kirsty Soames (Natalie Gumede), unaware that she is domestically abusing Tyrone Dobbs (Alan Halsall). Julie defends Kirsty on a number of occasions, even compromising her friendship with Fiz. Julie becomes suspicious of Kirsty's behaviour and Kirsty slaps Julie when she confronts her. Julie realises that Kirsty is the one abusing Tyrone and tries to plead his innocence but is told to go to the police.

Julie decides she would like to foster children to fill the void in her life and talks Brian into the idea. The pair meet with a children's social worker and Julie is delighted to be informed that she is an ideal candidate. Brian tells Julie that the fostering application has been declined, unaware he withdrew it. Her nephew, Todd Grimshaw (Bruno Langley) tells Julie that Brian does not want to foster and has got a new job in Wales. Upset, Julie ends the relationship but he attempts to persuade her to change her mind and join him in Wales. When she discovers that he withdrew the adoption application, she orders him to leave her alone. Brian then leaves for Wales but Julie misses him. Julie later allows Dennis to move in and he comes up with a plan to reconcile with his wife, Rita (Barbara Knox). Dennis and Julie stage a public argument which ends in Julie throwing Dennis out knowing that Rita will take pity on him. Julie plays along to help Dennis, but Julie accidentally tells Norris Cole (Malcolm Hebden). Norris informs Rita and she confronts Julie. When Rita ends her marriage to Dennis, he fights Norris then leaves Weatherfield.

Julie later begins a relationship with Dev, which annoys the Alahans' nanny Mary Taylor (Patti Clare). Julie and Mary argue regularly until Dev reveals they are upsetting his children, Aadi (Zennon Ditchett) and Asha (Tanisha Gorey). Julie and her colleagues are involved in a mini bus crash traveling to an awards ceremony. The driver, Steve McDonald (Simon Gregson), avoids boy races but veers off the road and crashes. Julie, Steve and Sean Tully (Antony Cotton) are the first to regain consciousness but Steve flees, leaving Julie and Sean to deal with the injured and Julie pulls her friends from the wreckage. Tracy Barlow (Kate Ford) saves Carla Connor (Alison King) just before the minibus falls off a cliff.

Dev goes to India and leaves Sophie in charge of the shop, Mary in charge of his children. Dev initially wanted Julie to take charge but Sophie and Mary change his mind. Julie moves into Dev's house, then she and Mary stop feuding and becomes friends, and allows Mary to stay at Dev's after she loses her motorhome. Dev returns from India, with Talisa Grady (Samantha Power). Julie thinks Dev and Talisa are friends but Mary realises that Dev has feelings for her. Brian returns and shocks Julie by asking her to go on a three month holiday with him. Brian's romantic gestures anger Julie who argues with him and slaps him. Julie is upset when she learns of Dev's feelings for Talisa and confronts them, but Talisa reveals she is a lesbian and leaves. Julie breaks-up with Dev and moves back in with Eileen. She decides to accept Brian's offer but tells him that she will be going alone, and not having to endure his romantic gestures anymore. Julie later accepts Brian's offer and they leave together. They later break-up and Brian returns alone.

== Reception ==
"Lovelorn Julie is the eternal optimist. Always ready with a barmy story, hilarious quip or marvellously tactless opinion, she single-handedly lightens up Weatherfield. Plus, her crazy wardrobe choices are all kinds of incredible."

— Inside Soap's Kate Woodward on Julie. (2011)

A columnist for the Daily Mirror opined that Julie "is not everyone’s cup of tea" because she has a habit of talking too much. She owns a "wacky wardrobe" complete with a "ditsy demeanour". They added that people would not normally think that this "chatterbox" is considered as a "sex symbol". The Daily Star's Peter Dyke and Katie Begley said that Julie is just "wacky". Kate Woodward of Inside Soap said that Julie was an unsung character that made the year 2010 in soap opera, "a joy to watch".

Kris Green of Digital Spy said that he was taken aback by the "standout performances" during the revelation that Colin was Julie's father. He added that Cavanagh and Duce's "outstanding performances" made "compelling viewing". A columnist for Holy Soap said Julie's most memorable moment was discovering that Colin was her father.

Inside Soap's Woodward later said that Julie had "been on the shelf for so long she was in danger of hitting her sell-by date". She hoped that Julie would stay with Brian because they had "the makings of a classic couple". A fellow columnist for the magazine said that after "months of mixed messages and ruined chances", they did not think Julie and her "Mr Darcy in a cardigan" would ever get together. Chloe Timms from the magazine praised Julie's return stating "she's brought us joy with her cheekiness, and we loved her trying to set Todd up!"

== Other appearances ==
Julie appeared in a stage adaptation of the serial, entitled Coronation Street: Street of Dreams in May 2012. Julie filled the pivotal role of the "Angel of the North"; who guided Paul O'Grady through fifty years of storylines. Cavanagh said that the prospect of playing Julie on stage was "very exciting".
