= Rhys Cadman =

English actor

- Born: 24 September 1998 (age 27); Oldham, England
- Occupation: Actor
- Years active: 2013–present
- Notable work: Coronation Street; Shameless; Appropriate Adult

Rhys Cadman (born 24 September 1998) is an English actor, best known for his work on Channel 4 comedy drama series Shameless as Tam Blanco and on ITV soap opera Coronation Street as Jackson Hodge.

== Filmography ==
Film	Character	Director	Year	Notes
Love, Lies and Records	Tom	N/A	2017	Starring Ashley Jensen and Steve Evets.
Northern Lights	Rob	Nicholas Connor	2016	Starring Gemma North, Katie Quinn and Megan Grady
Appropriate Adult	Andy Leach	Julian Jarrold	2011	Starring Dominic West and Emma Watson
Coronation Street	Jackson Hodge	Multiple	2015, 2017	12 Episodes
Shameless	Tam Blanco	Multiple	2013	10 Episodes
Doctors	Lewis Shepley	Simon Gibney	2013	
McDonald's Advert	The Boy		2013	"Nah You're Alright" Advertisement (Numerous parodies followed online)
