= Love, Lies and Records =

- Genre: Drama
- Created by: Kay Mellor
- Written by: Kay Mellor
- Directed by: Dominic Leclerc; Cilla Ware
- Starring: Ashley Jensen; Adrian Bower; Kenny Doughty; Mark Stanley; Rebecca Front; Rochenda Sandall; Lily Mae Pickering; Mandip Gill; Rhys Cadman
- Theme music composer: Nick Lloyd Webber
- Opening theme: "Our Day Will Come" by Amy Winehouse
- Ending theme: Nick Lloyd Webber
- Composer: Nick Lloyd Webber
- Country of origin: United Kingdom
- Original language: English
- No. of series: 1
- No. of episodes: 6 (see list)

Production
- Executive producers: Kay Mellor; Elizabeth Kilgarriff
- Producers: Josh Dynevor; Yvonne Francas
- Production locations: Leeds, West Yorkshire, England
- Editor: Kay Mellor
- Running time: 57 minutes
- Production company: Rollem Productions

Original release
- Network: BBC One; BBC One HD
- Release: 16 November – 21 December 2017

Love, Lies and Records is a British drama series, first broadcast on BBC One from 16 November to 21 December 2017. It follows registrar Kate Dickenson (Ashley Jensen) as she tries to juggle her personal life with the daily dramas of births, marriages, deaths and relationships and the impact they have on her. The series was written, created and directed by Kay Mellor.

== Cast ==
=== Main ===
- Ashley Jensen as Kate Dickenson
- Adrian Bower as Rob Armstrong
- Kenny Doughty as Rick Severs
- Mark Stanley as James/Jamie McKenzie
- Rebecca Front as Judy Fellows
- Rochenda Sandall as Anna Dickenson

=== Recurring ===
- Lily Mae Pickering as Lucy
- Mandip Gill as Talia
- Rhys Cadman as Tom
- Leila Mimmack as Marcia
- Gaja Filač as Kristina
- Katarina Čas as Dominika

== Episodes ==
=== Series 1 (2017) ===
No.	Title	Directed by	Written by	Original release date	UK viewers (millions)
1	"Episode 1"	Dominic Leclerc	Kay Mellor	16 November 2017	5.14
Senior registrar Kate Dickenson's (Ashley Jensen) promotion to superintendent is about to be announced and she knows that her colleague Judy (Rebecca Front), who was competing for her for the promotion, will not be happy with the news. Kate is enjoying a secret affair with her colleague Rick. Kate arranges the marriage of terminally ill Jenny to the father of her baby, Simon. Jenny dies after the wedding. Kate thinks that pregnant Slovenian Kristina's forthcoming marriage to Iranian student Amir is either bogus or forced. No-one is prepared for her colleague James (Mark Stanley) arriving at her house, then telling her that he is transitioning into being a woman called Jamie and that he will from now on be wearing women's clothes. Kate is alarmed to discover that her teenage daughter is hiding suspicious messages on her mobile phone. Kate's policeman partner Rob Armstrong's (Adrian Bower) son Liam unexpectedly comes to stay at the house putting the household under pressure.
2	"Episode 2"	Dominic Leclerc	Kay Mellor	23 November 2017	4.14
Kate is reeling from the discovery that Judy has incriminating footage of her and Rick (Kenny Doughty) having sex at work. After her spontaneous proposal to Rob, it is even more important that she keeps her affair secret. In an attempt to save her job and her relationship, she reluctantly steps down from her promotion. Kate performs a marriage between two men after Judy pulls out of doing it. Kate tells Judy that she must be opposed to same-sex marriage, because she has never performed one. Kate's day goes from bad to worse when Rob turns up to tell her that their daughter did not go to school that morning - making her more suspicious about the messages on Lucy's (Lily Mae Pickering) mobile.
3	"Episode 3"	Cilla Ware	Kay Mellor	30 November 2017	4.16
With Lucy missing, a panic-stricken Kate and Rob call on her friends in an attempt to find her. But as Rob's colleagues join the search, CCTV footage of her getting into an unknown vehicle leaves them more fearful than ever. At work, Kate is mortified when an anonymous email sends shockwaves through the register office - and as her colleagues reel from the content of the explosive message, Kate suspects that Judy has been up to no good once again.
4	"Episode 4"	Cilla Ware	Kay Mellor	7 December 2017	4.22
Kate is horrified to discover that spiteful colleague Judy has sent Rob a flash drive containing the incriminating footage. Her only hope is to destroy the USB stick before he sees it - but that proves easier said than done. Meanwhile, the registrars prepare for the raid on Kristina (Gaja Filac) and Amir's (Noof McEwan) wedding - a case that takes on increased urgency with the discovery of another young woman's body.
5	"Episode 5"	Dominic Leclerc	Kay Mellor	14 December 2017	4.13
After Rob's surprise proposal, Kate finally has everything she thought she wanted - but in the cold light of morning, she is not so sure. As she struggles to choose between her heart and her head, she is caught off-guard when Rick's partner Olivia (Sally Carman) turns up to confront her. But what does she want? As if things could not get any worse, at work she is shocked to discover the real reason Amir and Ramin knew immigration were going to raid the wedding, although she is convinced she can use this information to help Rob get his man.
6	"Episode 6"	Dominic Leclerc	Kay Mellor	21 December 2017	4.54
Rob discovers the photographs Kate had hidden, and before long a series of secrets and lies come tumbling out between the couple. As Kate is forced to face the reality of her choices, her team at work prepares to set up a sting with immigration to catch Marcia in the act. But with the police back at the register office, she is worried what will happen if Rob and Rick end up in the same room together. Meanwhile, a celebrity wedding is threatened when the bride and groom realise they have forgotten something important.

== Home media ==
A series DVD was released via Acorn Media in December 2017.
