= Kerry Peers =

Welsh actress (born 1964)

- Born: Kerry Roberta Peers; 1 November 1964 (age 61); Northop Hall, Wales
- Occupation: Actress

Kerry Peers (born 1 November 1964) is a British actress who is best known for her role in The Bill where she played Suzi Croft from 1993 to 1998. She has also been in Casualty, Doctors, Holby City, Brookside and appeared on Coronation Street from October 2019 to January 2020.

== Early life ==
Kerry Roberta Peers was born on 1 November 1964 in the small village of Northop Hall, near Mold in North Wales, where she spent her childhood.

== Acting ==
Peers moved to London, where she attended the Central School of Speech and Drama. On leaving drama school she performed in a number of plays, such as Les liaisons dangereuses (with the Royal Shakespeare Company) and was also in the original cast of Alan Ayckbourn's Mr A's Amazing Maze Plays at the Stephen Joseph Theatre in Scarborough.

In 1993, Peers joined the cast of The Bill as DC Suzi Croft, leaving in 1998. Since then she has continued to appear on television in series such as Waterloo Road, Casualty, Holby City, The Case, Doctors, The Royal Today and Shameless. She was also a regular cast member of Brookside 2002–2003, playing the part of Helen Carey. In November 2019, she appeared in an episode of the BBC soap opera Doctors as Yvette Froom.

Peers has also continued to appear on-stage, playing Nurse Ratched in an acclaimed version of One Flew Over the Cuckoo's Nest as well as roles in Paradise Bound and Billy Liar.

In 2018, she appeared in a supporting role in the ITV1 miniseries Butterfly.

== Awards ==
In 2003, Peers won the Manchester Evening News Theatre Award for Best Actress in a Supporting Actress Role for her part in Neil Simon's Brighton Beach Memoirs at the Oldham Coliseum Theatre.
