= Lisa George =

English actress

- Born: 15 October 1970 (age 55); Grimsby, Lincolnshire, England
- Education: Royal Welsh College of Music & Drama
- Occupation: Actress
- Years active: 1993–present
- Known for: Role of Beth Tinker in Coronation Street

Lisa George (born 15 October 1970) is an English actress. She played the role of Beth Tinker in the ITV soap opera Coronation Street from 2011 to 2024. In 2020, George competed in the twelfth series of Dancing on Ice, finishing in fifth place.

== Career ==
=== Coronation Street ===
In August 2011, she began portraying the role of Beth Tinker, the ex-girlfriend of Steve McDonald (Simon Gregson), in two episodes of Coronation Street. She was later brought back as a regular cast member. For her role as Beth, George has been nominated as Best Newcomer in the 2012 annual TV Choice Awards. She stated she was "shocked and over the moon" to be nominated for the award. Also played family liaison officer for Harris family in March 2005.

In December 2023, it was confirmed that George had quit her role as Beth after thirteen years, and would depart in Summer 2024.

George also played the family liaison officer for the Harrises during 2005, after Katy killed Tommy, prior to appearing as Beth Sutherland in 2011.

=== Other ventures ===
In 1997, George toured with a stage musical production of Prisoner: Cell Block H. Her television credits include a role in the 2003 BAFTA nominated television adaptation of the Jacqueline Wilson novel The Illustrated Mum, as well as episodes of British serial dramas Casualty, Holby City and Emmerdale.

In 2020, George began competing in the twelfth series of Dancing on Ice, alongside professional partner Tom Naylor.

== Filmography ==
Year	Title	Role	Notes
1994	The Bill	Melissa Wilson	Episode: "Just Say No"
1997	Coronation Street	Nurse	Episode #1.4271
1998	Crimewatch File	Katie Ellery	Episode: "Manhunt"
1998	The Cops	Elaine Sharpe	Series 1: Episode 4
1999	City Central	Julie Caplett	Episode: "The Grace of God"
1999	Children's Ward	Lesley's Mum	Episode #11.8
2001	Casualty	Julie Wharton	Episode: "It's a Family Affair"
2003	The Illustrated Mum	Miss Hill	Television film
2004	Holby City	Dawn Brady	Episode: "Happy Families"
2005	Coronation Street	Family Liaison Officer	5 episodes
2005	Emmerdale	Pauline Arkwright	Guest role
2008	Boy	Ed's Wife	Short film
2011–2024	Coronation Street	Beth Tinker	Series regular
2020	Dancing on Ice	Herself	Contestant (5th place)
