= Katy Cavanagh =

English actress (born 1973)

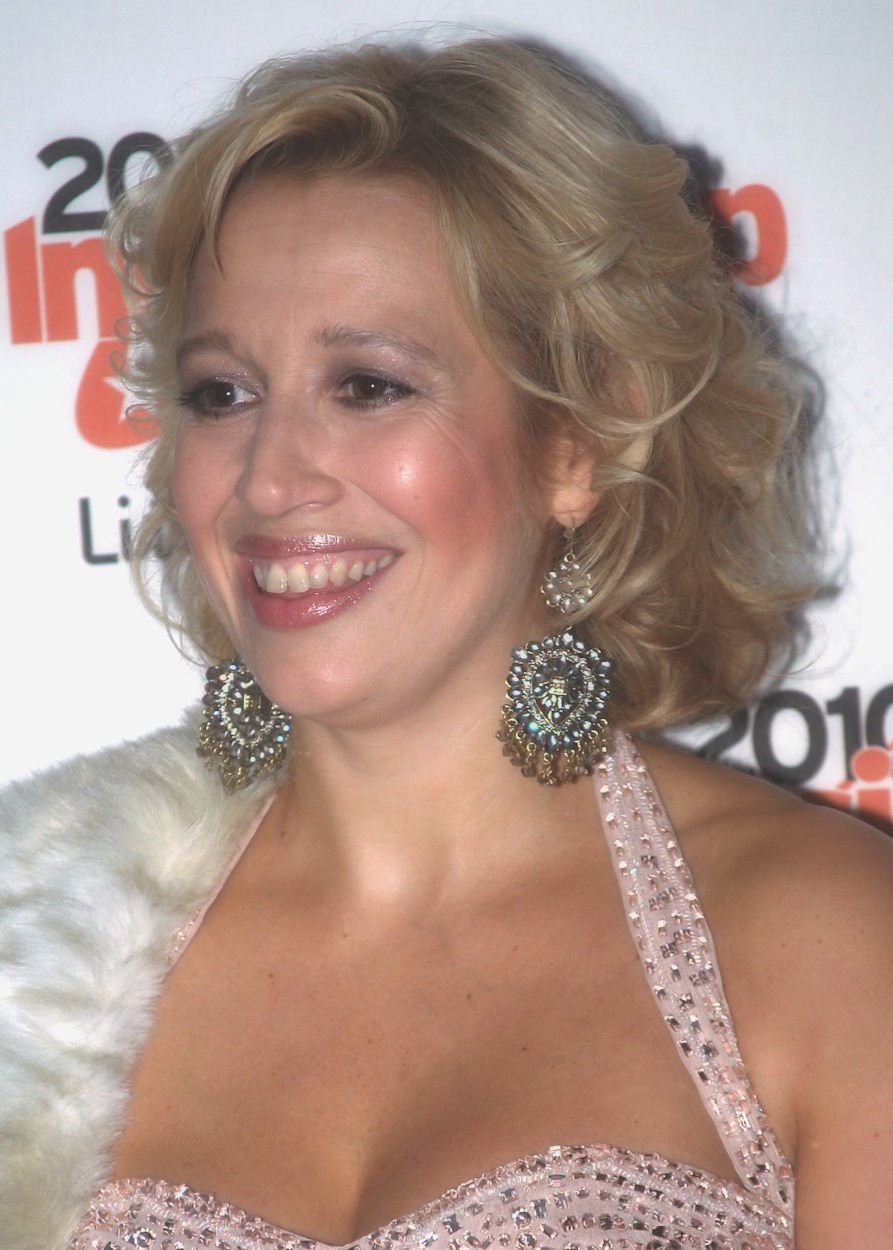
- Cavanagh in 2010
- Born: Kathryn Sarah Collins; 12 December 1973 (age 52); North Shields, Northumberland, England
- Occupation: Actress
- Years active: 1997–present
- Spouse: Chris Jupe
- Children: 3, including Noah Jupe and Jacobi Jupe

Kathryn Sarah Collins Jupe (born 12 December 1973), known professionally as Katy Cavanagh, is an English actress. She is known for playing Julie Carp in the ITV soap opera Coronation Street (2008–2015, 2025). She also had regular roles in BBC drama The Cops (1998–2001), and the ITV drama Bob & Rose (2001). In November 2017, she appeared in the comedy television film Murder on the Blackpool Express.

== Early life ==
Cavanagh was born in North Shields, the daughter of Anne, a drama teacher, and Geoff, a headmaster. She grew up in Bolton, Lancashire. She was educated at Canon Slade School and trained at RADA and National Youth Theatre.

== Career ==
Cavanagh has appeared regularly on British television since 1997. She had a regular role as Mel in The Cops from 1998 to 2001. In 2004, she had a regular role as Sergeant Dawn "Spike" Milligan in the television series Dalziel and Pascoe. In 2006, she appeared in an episode of the Channel 4 drama Shameless as Shirley Lawson. In 2008, she joined the ITV soap opera Coronation Street as Julie Carp. In February 2015, it was announced that she would leave Coronation Street in order to pursue other interests. Her final episode aired on 3 July 2015. Cavanagh returned to the role in 2025, to accommodate the departure of Eileen Grimshaw (Sue Cleaver).

== Personal life ==
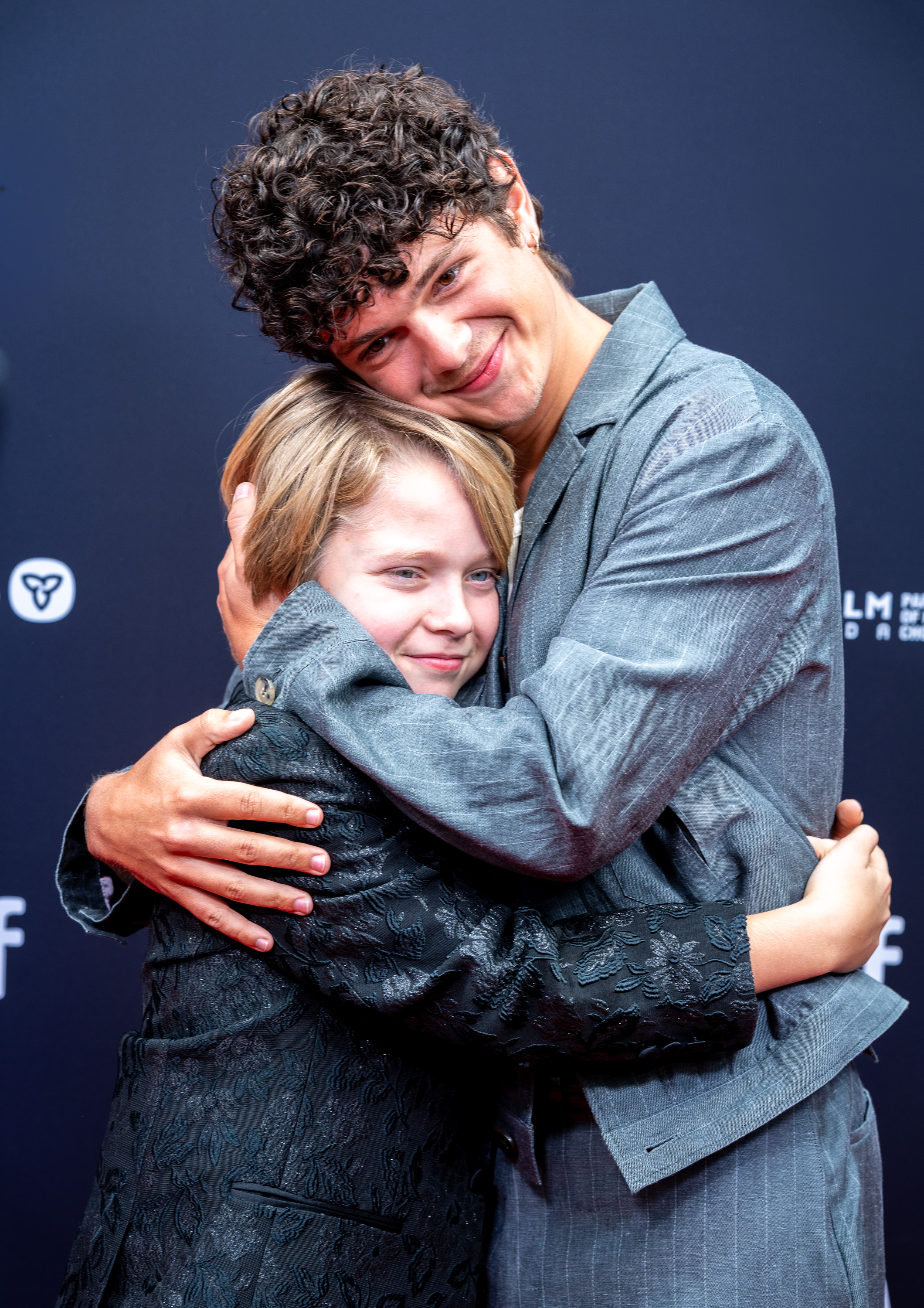
Cavanagh's sons Jacobi and Noah

Cavanagh is married to filmmaker Chris Jupe. They have three children, including Noah and Jacobi.

== Filmography ==
Year	Title	Role	Notes
1997	Wycliffe	Mrs. Vassie	Episode: "Strangers Home"
1997	A Dance to the Music of Time	Billson	Episode: "The Thirties"
1998	Sex 'n' Death	Ruby	Television film
1998–2001	The Cops	Mel	Main role
2000	Holby City	Lucy Harper	2 episodes
2000	The Bill	Leanne Gibbs	Episode: "Nightwork"
2000	A Likeness in Stone	Cathy	Television film
2000	Peak Practice	Lynee Rhodes	Episode: "Hit and Run"
2000	Blue Kenny	Tania Barrett	Short film
2001	Where the Heart Is	Sally Merrick	Episode: "Choices"
2001	Vacuuming Completely Nude in Paradise	Sheila	Television film
2001	Ice Cool Reception	Nikki	Short film
2001	Bob & Rose	Anita Kendrick	6 episodes
2001	Judge John Deed	Monika Latymer	Episode: "Appropriate Response"
2002	Ted and Alice	Joy	
2003	Rehab	Sam	Television film
2003	Burn It	Kelly	2 episodes
2004	Dalziel and Pascoe	DS Dawn "Spike" Milligan	Recurring role
2004	A Line in the Sand	Leanne	Television film
2004	The Golden Hour	Una Campbell	1 episode
2005, 2006	Bodies	Harriet Hurley	3 episodes
2006	Shameless	Shirley Lawson	1 episode
2006	The Royal	Carol Buxton	Episode: "Seeking Refuge"
2006	The Family Man	Tina	Television film
2006	Cracker	Helen	Episode: "Nine Eleven"
2006	The Bill	Maria Clyne	Episode: "436"
2007	The Street	Tracy	1 episode
2007	Blue Murder	Geraldine Pettigrew	Episode: "Crisis Management"
2008	The Bill	Linda Johnson	2 episodes
2008–2015, 2025	Coronation Street	Julie Carp	Regular role 670 episodes
2008	Wired	DS Stuart	2 episodes
2013	Bradford Halifax London	Mam	Short film
2014	Text Santa	Julie Carp	Coronation Street special
2016	Birds of a Feather	Lorraine Howe	1 episode
2017	Midsomer Murders	Lena Ferrera	1 episode
2017	Murder on the Blackpool Express	Grace	Television Film
2021	Not Going Out	Karen	1 episode
