= Andy Whyment =

English actor

- Born: 2 April 1981 (age 45); Salford, Greater Manchester, England
- Occupation: Actor
- Years active: 1993–present
- Television: The Royle Family (1999–2000); Coronation Street (1990, 1997, 1999, 2000–present); I'm a Celebrity...Get Me Out of Here! (2019, 2023)
- Spouse: Nichola Whyment (m. 2007)
- Children: 2

Andrew Whyment (/ˈwaɪmənt/, born 2 April 1981) is an English actor, best known for playing Darren Sinclair-Jones in the BBC sitcom The Royle Family, and Kirk Sutherland on Coronation Street.

== Career ==
Whyment trained at the Laine Johnson Theatre School in Salford. His first credited part was in Cracker in 1993. He also had minor roles in The Cops, Heartbeat and Where the Heart Is. From 1999 to 2000, Whyment appeared as Darren Sinclair-Jones in the BBC sitcom The Royle Family. Since 2000, he has played Kirk Sutherland in Coronation Street.

In 2006, Whyment appeared as a contestant in the ITV reality singing competition Soapstar Superstar. In July 2010, he was seen at an audition for The X Factor in Manchester; he was auditioning as his Coronation Street character and sang the Kings of Leon song "Sex on Fire". He also took part in the 2012 series of Dancing on Ice and was paired up with professional skater Vicky Ogden.

In 2019, he participated in the nineteenth series of I'm a Celebrity...Get Me Out of Here! and finished in second place.

In 2023, he appeared in I'm a Celebrity... South Africa.

== Personal life ==
Whyment married his long-term girlfriend Nichola in 2007. They have two children.

== Awards ==
- 2003 – British Soap Award for Best Comedy Performance

== See also ==
- List of Dancing on Ice contestants
- List of I'm a Celebrity...Get Me Out of Here! (British TV series) contestants
