= Faye Windass =

Fictional character from Coronation Street

- Coronation Street character
- Portrayed by: Ellie Leach
- Duration: 2011–2023
- First appearance: Episode 7521; 24 January 2011
- Last appearance: Episode 10959; 24 May 2023
- Introduced by: Phil Collinson
In-universe information
- Other names: Faye Butler
- Occupation: Student; Waitress
- Father: Tim Metcalfe
- Mother: Jenny Butler
- Adoptive mother: Anna Windass
- Stepmother: Sally Webster
- Half-brothers: Gary Windass (adoptive)
- Daughters: Miley Hodge
- Grandfathers: Geoff Metcalfe
- Grandmothers: Elaine Jones
- Nephews: Jake Windass (adoptive); Zack Rubinstein (adoptive)

Faye Windass (also Butler) is a fictional character from the British ITV soap opera Coronation Street, portrayed by Ellie Leach. She was introduced as a potential adoptive child for Anna (Debbie Rush) and Eddie Windass (Steve Huison) in the episode aired on 24 January 2011. Faye's early storylines have included being adopted by Anna and Eddie, being the victim and perpetrator of bullying, contacting her birth father Tim Metcalfe (Joe Duttine) and accusing Anna of abusing her. Her later storylines include her falling pregnant at the age of 13 and keeping it secret from her family. Faye's struggling to bond with her daughter, Miley (Erin, Eilah and Elsie Halliwell) results in her giving her up to Jackson Hodge (Rhys Cadman), Miley's dad. Other storylines involve her relationships with Seb Franklin (Harry Visinoni) and Craig Tinker (Colson Smith), being imprisoned after attacking Adam Barlow (Sam Robertson) after a case of mistaken identity, being sexually assaulted and being diagnosed with premature menopause. In April 2023, it was announced that Leach had been written out after 12 years, with her final scenes airing on 24 May 2023.

== Casting ==
The character of Faye is created as a potential adoptive child for Anna and Eddie Windass. The casting of Ellie Leach was announced in January 2011. Of her casting, her cousin, co-star Brooke Vincent, said "I am chuffed to bits for her. She has made me so happy. We are all thrilled about it and I can't wait to be with her on set to show her around." A show source added "Brooke was behind her all the way and was praying she would get the part - and after Ellie won the bosses over she couldn't contain herself. She was so pleased and happy for her. Ellie-Louise is made of the same stuff as Brooke, which means she'll fit in and get on well with everyone."

== Development ==
=== Early development ===
Faye is introduced in January 2011 as the potential adoptive child of Anna (Debbie Rush) and Eddie Windass (Steve Huison). In November 2011, a storyline involving Faye and Anna's partner, Owen Armstrong (Ian Puleston-Davies), was announced, where Owen would hit Faye in Anna's absence. The scenes aired in January 2012, watched by 9.5 million viewers and the plot sparked outrage from viewers, with some complaining to ITV and OFCOM. However, the NSPCC said they were glad the show sparked the debate. A spokesman for the show said they "did not condone Owen’s actions and that it would have ramifications for his relationship."

"It all comes completely out of the blue. Anna’s got no idea that this is going to happen. She never thought Faye would tell such a bad lie about her mum [...] She’s [Anna] very worried because she knows that this is serious stuff [...] Anna’s absolutely devastated [...] Some of the scenes are really heartbreaking. Anna can’t quite believe that she’s taken this little girl on, sacrificed so much, loved her like her own and now this is the betrayal she’s getting. But we have to remember that Faye is only ten – she’s a confused little girl who’s had an awful upbringing. For the first time in her life, Faye wants to make a decision of her own, but she’s just going about it the wrong way."

— Rush on Faye's alleged assault against Anna (2013)

In an interview with Daniel Kilkelly, on 9 August 2012, producer Phil Collinson revealed that there are plans to introduce Faye's father, who is "going to come along and challenge things for Anna." A source from the show said that "Anna is very hurt that Faye has been secretly contacting her biological dad, she wants a fresh start for Faye that doesn't include Tim, and puts her foot down." Spoiler pictures that were released on 13 January 2013, revealed that Joe Duttine had been cast in the role of Tim Metcalfe, Faye's dad. Tim arrived on 21 January 2013, following weeks of contact with Faye. In March 2013, it was revealed that Faye would tell headteacher Brian Packham that Anna hits her in a bid to live with Tim.

Ella-Grace Gregoire is introduced as Faye's friend Grace Piper in September 2013 and the two of them are involved in the cyberbullying of Simon Barlow (Alex Bain), where they force Simon in a dress, film it and share the video. Rush says Anna is "absolutely devastated [...] but Anna doesn’t believe it, just like she didn’t believe Faye was throwing stones at Mary’s motor home. But having seen the evidence Anna panics." The situation leaves Anna wondering "what else might she [Faye] be capable of" and Anna feels guilty. The storyline culminates in Faye and Grace's actions being reported to the police and Faye is "terrified" and Faye went along with Grace as she "doesn’t want to be ostracised and doesn’t want to drop her mate in it. She’s also terrified of what Grace might do. It’s only when Anna tells her how serious things are that Faye realises she must tell the truth.”

=== Teenage pregnancy and motherhood ===
On 19 June 2014, it was announced that Faye would fall pregnant at the age of 12, with a show source saying it "is bound to be a controversial storyline but the programme has a history of handling difficult subject matters in a sensitive and considerate way" and that "bosses are still working out the exact details of the controversial storyline, including who the father is." Previously done with Sarah-Louise Platt (Tina O'Brien), producer Stuart Blackburn, said that whilst "in some respects life went back to normal" for Sarah, "that won't happen" with Faye. Rush discussed scenes where Faye goes into labour, saying "none of the family know about it, there's only Craig in on it. As the week unfolds we'll see how he becomes a really good friend" and that "everything explodes" She said that Faye "panics at the end" and needs her family" She added that "It's not going to be roses around the door. We're showing just how serious it is" and they hope "that's going to come across. It's not a good thing, and it's really tough on all the family and everyone concerned." Rush described Faye as "an annoying teenager", but a child who "came from a really unhappy, broken background - passed from pillar to post."

Following the birth, Faye struggles to bond with her baby, Miley Windass (Erin, Eilah and Elsie Halliwell), who she names after pop singer Miley Cyrus. Rush explained "Faye doesn’t choose the name for a while [...] because she’s completely in denial." and Faye "calls her Miley, like Wrecking Ball" as Miley "is a wrecking ball!" Jackson Hodge (Rhys Cadman) initially denies being Miley's father, but Jackson and his parents later want to be involved with Miley, however, Anna "realises just how much motherhood is taking its toll" on Faye and she is "forced to consider the possibility" of Miley living with the Hodge's." Rush explains "she wants Faye to take responsibility as she thinks that is the best way to get her to bond with the baby" despite Anna knowing "how much Faye has been struggling with the fact that she's now a mum but she's done her best to try and encourage Faye to do the right thing." She added that Anna has "adopted the tough love approach with Faye." Rush says the family are "heartbroken" when it's decided Miley should live with Jackson and his parents, though it's the "right thing for Miley." Faye's pregnancy and Miley's birth acts as a catalyst for the departure of Owen. Owen wrongly assumes Craig is the father and he assaults Craig and Owen's "attitude in the wake of Faye giving birth is the final straw for Anna." Faye is left stunned when she reunites with Miley and Jackson in 2017. The meeting with Miley will "spur" Faye into wondering whether she should get "more involved in Miley’s life."

Duncan Lindsay, from Metro, said that the storyline is showing "a whole new vulnerable side to the character" and "pairing her up with the legendary Craig has been a masterstroke and the care he is showing his friend has been beautifully endearing to watch". Rush said she is "so proud" of Leach, saying "she's been absolutely brilliant."

=== Relationship with Seb Franklin ===
Harry Visioni joined the serial in October 2016 as Faye's new boyfriend, Seb Franklin (Harry Visinoni). Anna is "instantly worried" about Faye having a boyfriend due to being a teenage mother, but receives criticism from her new partner, Kevin Webster (Michael Le Vell), over the handling of the situation. Seb soon wins Anna's approval during a family meal, but when Faye is given an expensive gift, it raises the question of whether "everything [is] as it seems." Seb's "dark side" emerges when Craig "intervenes" out of concern for Faye, but she is "left furious" when Seb alleges Craig threatened him, leading to Seb possibly driving "a wedge" between Faye and Craig.

=== Departure ===
In April 2023, it was confirmed that Leach would be leaving Coronation Street after 12 years in the role of Faye, with her departure scenes set to air in a "huge story" in summer 2023. Her final scenes were broadcast on 24 May 2023.

== Storylines ==
Faye is introduced to Eddie (Steve Huison) and Anna Windass (Debbie Rush) by her social worker, Hilary Pugsley (Caroline Pegg). After several visits, Faye begins to like the Windasses but the adoption is threatened by the revelation that their son, Gary (Mikey North), has been discharged from the army and will be living with them. Despite this, Faye stays the night at the Windasses' for the first time in February. When Faye visits in March, she is annoyed to discover that Eddie and Anna have been searching her bag and she storms out in a mood. Gary, however, speaks to Faye and convinces her that they can be trusted. When Faye stays overnight, Eddie accidentally washes Faye's blanket, she is furious and tells him that it is the only thing that she has to remember her mother by before insisting on returning to her foster home. Faye later moves in with the Windass family permanently. When Faye and Anna visit neighbour, Fiz Stape (Jenny McAlpine) and her baby Hope, Faye steals a bag containing £500 that Fiz is keeping secret from husband, John (Graeme Hawley). Faye gives Anna the bag as a gift but Anna finds the money and insists Faye tell her where she got it from. Faye admits that she stole it and a box of chocolates from The Kabin and earrings from her foster home that she also gave Anna, making Anna and Eddie worry about Faye's behaviour. Soon after, Anna and Eddie learn from Hilary that Faye's mother has died from a heroin overdose and she urges them to tell Faye. Anna wants to tell her after a picnic that she and Faye had planned but Eddie accidentally tells her. When Eddie leaves for Germany, Faye thinks it is her fault that he left but Anna reassures her that she is not to blame. When Katy Armstrong (Georgia May Foote) falls pregnant, Faye tells her father, Owen (Ian Puleston-Davies), making Katy think Anna told him so Anna asks Faye if she was responsible but she denies it. In November 2011, Faye's adoption becomes official but her happiness is short-lived when she discovers that Owen is dating Anna. Faye is scared that Owen will not want her around but Gary, Owen and Anna promise her that nothing will change.

Faye is bullied by Lindsay Hayward (Eleni Foskett) for being adopted. Anna notices that Faye is more withdrawn and on checking her computer, finds evidence of bullying and promptly takes it to the school. Headmaster Brian Packham (Peter Gunn) takes it seriously, but worries when he discovers the bully's identity as Lindsay's grandmother is head of the board of governors. He then tries to dismiss it as childish pranks, leading Anna to remove Faye from school. Knowing what would be expected if the bully was any other child, Brian reports it and Lindsay is suspended. Brian asks Faye to give the school another chance on the promise that Lindsay will be closely watched, which she does.

Anna discovers that Faye is in touch with her birth father Tim Metcalfe (Joe Duttine), who she hasn't seen since she was two years old. Neither Anna nor Owen are happy with the situation and trying to stop her contacting Tim, Owen even destroys her computer but when Tim learns of this and sees Owen's temper in action himself, he warns Anna that if she persists in trying to keep him out of Faye's life, he will report Faye's family life as unsafe to Social Services. Worried about losing Faye, Anna reluctantly gave in as she had also been advised by her social worker that there was no reason not to allow him access. Faye tells Anna she wants to live with her dad. Anna confronts Tim about it and Tim says he has no idea about the situation. When Anna comes to pick Faye up again, she refuses to budge, so Anna drags her back home, kicking and screaming. When Faye returns, she screams to Anna and Owen that she hates them and smashes a cupboard and some ornaments. Still upset and livid at Anna, she makes a shocking allegation to Brian about Anna hitting her. However, when she gets interviewed by the police, she admits she made it up as she doesn't want Anna going to prison. She explains to Anna that while she will love her forever, she feels different with her father. Anna asks Tim if Faye can live with him temporarily, Tim still doesn't think it's a good idea, but after some persuasion, he agrees, much to Faye's delight. Tim takes up a temporary job up in Newcastle and Faye is supposed to stay with Anna. Unknown to Anna, Faye is staying in the flat alone. Owen soon discovers Faye on her own when Sophie Webster (Brooke Vincent) reveals Faye tried to shoplift. In July 2013, Faye decides to go back to Anna's to live. Anna tells Owen to warn Tim off. Owen acts friendly but then grabs Tim's hand and threatens him to leave Weatherfield. In the end, Owen and Anna agree to let Tim stay, and he starts a relationship with Sally Webster (Sally Dynevor).

Faye starts Weatherfield High School and makes friends with a girl named Grace Piper (Ella-Grace Gregoire) who appears to be innocent, but actually is a troublemaker who tries to get Faye to become like her. However, Grace soon shows her true colours and encourages Faye to throw stones at Mary Taylor's (Patti Clare) caravan and to torment Nick Tilsley (Ben Price), who has recently suffered brain damage. Grace then forces Faye to put Simon Barlow (Alex Bain) into a dress and films the incident. Although Faye initially denies any wrongdoing, the video is soon found by Peter Barlow (Chris Gascoyne) and Faye is forced to admit the truth. When the police become involved, Faye admits that Grace has been forcing her to do things by threatening not to be her friend anymore. Faye is given a caution and tells Anna that she and Grace are no longer friends. Anna reassures her she'll be able to make new friends and she can start to show people she is not really a bully. Faye returns home drunk after attending a bowling party. Owen and Gary get into a conflict about the parental responsibility of Faye. Several weeks later, Owen turns bankrupt and debt collectors take the furniture from the Windass' house. As Christmas approaches, Faye and her family move into Peter's old flat. In December 2014, Owen and Gary fight when Katy makes a snide comment about Gary, leading to Gary accidentally breaking Faye's headphones, as part of a Christmas present from her family. A remorseful Gary promises to make it up to Faye by buying her some new ones.

Faye mentions to Craig Tinker (Colson Smith) that she is being bullied by some girls in her year, as she says that they mock her about her weight. She continues to miss school and starve herself, and after Audrey Roberts (Sue Nicholls) spots Faye in the shopping precinct when she should be in school, Anna pushes Craig to tell her what's happening. Faye tells Anna she was at the precinct to work on a school project, but Katy sees her in the park and catches her trying to smoke when a packet of cigarettes fall out of her bag. Katy is worried for Faye, but sympathetic when Faye reveals she thinks smoking will make her thin. Katy agrees not to tell Anna, but Anna and Owen have already found out that Faye is bunking off school. Faye eventually confesses about the bullying, explaining she kept silent out of fear that Anna would "make a fuss about her". After looking up Faye's symptoms online to find out what's going on with her weight, Craig is suspicious that Faye may be pregnant. Faye takes a pregnancy test, which confirms she is pregnant. Faye is scared and terrified, with only Craig there to support her. Faye watches a birthing video, which worries her. She confides in Craig about her plan to abandon her baby as soon as she gives birth. During her parents' evening, Faye comes face-to-face with the father of her baby, Jackson Hodge (Rhys Cadman) and she runs out of the school hall, upset. Faye has a plan to give birth in Dev Alahan's (Jimmi Harkishin) old flat above the shop and abandon the baby as she planned at the start. Faye and Craig intend on staying in the flat until Faye is ready to give birth, but she goes into labour unexpectedly and feeling scared, she tells Craig to get Anna and Owen. Sophie hears Faye crying in pain and she comes into the flat to find Faye on the floor and in labour. Owen and Anna arrive in time and they discover that Faye is close to giving birth. Faye gives birth to a baby girl whom she names Miley, after singer Miley Cyrus. After the baby is born, Faye refuses to meet, let alone look at her own daughter. Faye and the baby come home from hospital after Faye is interviewed by the police, who she tells about the father is a boy from school. Faye confides in Sophie, revealing to her that the father of her baby is Jackson, who she liked and was devastated to discover that Jackson never liked her back. Faye has the courage to tell Anna about Jackson being the baby's father and Anna arranges a meeting with Jackson and his parents the next day. After accusing Craig of getting Faye pregnant and hitting Kirk Sutherland (Andrew Whyment), Owen is arrested for assault after being reported. The aftermath of Faye's pregnancy and the baby's birth is the main gossip around the street. Owen is let off with a caution after his attack on Kirk and he comes home the next day. Faye comes face-to-face once again with Jackson when he and his parents arrive on Anna's doorstep. Anna breaks the news to the family that Faye has given birth and Jackson is the father of Faye's baby. When Jackson denies being near Faye, let alone having a one-night stand with her, Faye angrily confronts Jackson to tell the truth, but he refuses. Jackson and his family leave after Jackson's mother makes cruel remarks about Faye.

Faye receives a visit from the social worker, who asks Faye how she feels about taking on maternal responsibility of the baby, as she is very young. Faye admits that she is not ready to be a mother and she wants her baby to be adopted, devastating Anna, who blames Faye's outburst on Owen. As Faye comes to terms with her decisions on the baby's upbringing, she discovers that Owen and Anna have split up for good and Owen announces to a distraught Faye that he is leaving Weatherfield to go and live in Scotland. Faye very slowly learns how to care for her daughter and she names her baby girl Miley.

Faye continues to struggle with the responsibility of Miley, as she allows her mother to care for Miley. When Tim allows Faye to go on a school trip, Faye returns afterwards and Anna arrives at the school with Miley and angrily confronts her daughter, as she tells Faye that it is time for her to get her priorities straight and focus on the upbringing of Miley. Now, with the support of Miley's paternal family, Faye slowly learns how to care for her daughter. At Miley's christening, all is proven too much for Faye when she breaks down and admits to her father that she is not ready to be a mother so young. The christening is cancelled by Tim, who is offered a solution to keep Faye and Miley happy; for the Hodges to gain the care of Miley to prevent her from being adopted, as Faye no longer wants Miley to be a part of her life. Tim and Anna discuss the options with Faye, who admits that she could never hate or blame Miley for the recent events, but she does love her and wants what is best for her. In the end, Miley's grandmother collects her and the Windasses are devastated as Miley leaves their family for good. Miley goes on holiday with the Hodges to Canada and when they are due back, Tim tells Anna that their house was up to let. Anna contacts Josie and eventually manages to get hold of her and Anna and Tim discover that they aren't coming back from Canada. Anna and Tim tell Faye and they later ask her if she wants Miley back, but Faye decides that Miley should remain in Canada with the Hodges.

After keeping their relationship secret, Anna and Kevin Webster (Michael Le Vell) tell Faye they are dating. Faye offers to babysit Jake and her boyfriend, Seb Franklin (Harry Visinoni), visits. Anna and Kevin walk in on Faye and Seb and Anna has a go at Faye. Kevin gets Anna to make up with Faye and invite Seb to join them for a family meal. Seb impresses Faye's family and the pair later share a kiss. Faye struggles with Anna being in hospital with severe burns and she drinks alcohol. Seb tells Faye that Craig threatened him. Faye steals Pat Phelan's (Connor McIntyre) phone to impress Seb and Anna is furious with Faye for taking it. Faye is taken to a gig by Gary with his girlfriend's, Sarah Platt's (Tina O'Brien), daughter Bethany Platt (Lucy Fallon). Bethany lays seductively on Gary's bed and Faye catches her. Bethany gives Faye vodka to keep quiet, but Faye drops hints at dinner. Bethany admits to giving Faye the vodka when she is drunk. Anna is furious when Faye spends her birthday money on a tattoo and Seb supplied her with a fake ID. Faye is taken to the hospital with Gary and Izzy when the tattoo becomes infected and Faye sees Miley and Jackson. Faye takes Jackson and Miley home to see Anna and Tim. Seb assaults Jackson, as he is jealous at his closeness with Faye, and is arrested. Anna forbids Faye from seeing Seb, but Faye's stepsister, Rosie Webster (Helen Flanagan), gets Faye to talk to him.

Faye is upset when Seb is sentenced to four months imprisonment and persuades Phelan to take her to visit Seb. Anna catches Faye in Phelan's van and Anna drives the van away with Faye inside. Faye and Anna argue about Faye's relationship with Seb and about Phelan and Faye runs off. Anna reluctantly agrees to Faye moving in with Gary and Izzy in the short term. Anna, Tim and Kevin discover Faye has had sex with Seb when a condom wrapper is found in the bin. Tim forces Seb to break up with Faye, but they meet up and agree to keep their relationship secret. Faye is upset when Seb breaks up with her, but they get back together when an injured Seb, claiming he has been in a fight, worries he will be sent back to young offenders and wants to be with Faye. Faye packs a bag and Seb finds out she has planned for them to run away to stop him going to young offenders, but Seb is not happy with her idea. Anna, Tim and Kevin are worried when Faye has left her phone and is planning to go to Dublin. Seb admits his stepfather was responsible for causing the injury. Seb attempts to steal a car, but when the owners show up, he flees and Faye is caught and collected from the police station by Tim and Kevin.

After weeks of Anna helping Seb with his family, Faye accuses Seb of having an affair with Anna after finding texts between the pair and when he takes Faye to see his house, they find his mother, Abi Franklin (Sally Carman), unconscious after overdosing. Faye and Seb are angry at Anna after social services take Seb's brother and sister into care, accusing Anna of phoning them. Faye is distraught when Seb falls off a ladder. Anna and Tim find out that Seb may have HIV from his ex-girlfriend, which Faye might have. Seb tells Anna that he and Faye never have unprotected sex, but a condom did split. Faye calls the police on Anna after Seb says Anna pushed him and Faye is told about Seb having HIV and that she requires a test by Anna, Tim and Sally. Faye's result is negative whilst Seb is positive and Faye is determined to stand by Seb. Sally allows Seb to move in with her and admits she called social services, but Seb understands Sally's reasons and decides to stay. Anna is arrested by the police again when Pat convinces Seb that she was responsible. Prior to her bail hearing, Gary is annoyed that Faye is starting to believe Phelan and Anna is refused bail. Faye refuses to live with Tim or Gary, choosing to stay with Seb at Pat's. Faye refuses to listen to Gary's negative views on Phelan, but he tells Faye that Pat raped Anna once. Gary explains that Pat forced Anna to have sex as he put their family in debt and was overworking him and Owen, but Faye does not believe it was rape. When Anna collapses in prison, she is taken to hospital but escapes when the prison guard is occupied. Faye notices Phelan's gleeful reaction and confronts him over what happened between him and Anna. Faye breaks up with Seb when he refuses to believe Anna did not push him, siding with Phelan. When Anna arranges to meet Gary in the park, Seb overhears and reports it to Phelan, who calls the police and Faye and Gary ask Craig to warn Anna of police presence, which Craig reluctantly does. Anna escapes and hides in Roy Cropper's (David Neilson) flat and Faye and Gary are reunited with Anna when David Platt (Jack P. Shepherd) catches her there but agrees to keep quiet. Anna accidentally hits Eileen Phelan (Sue Cleaver) over the head when she tries to find proof at the yard that Phelan is lying and when he returns, he calls the police and Anna flees with Faye. Anna and Faye are tracked down by the police and Faye is taken back to Gary. At Anna's trial, Seb tells the court Anna was not responsible for his injuries, but she is found guilty and sent to prison. Seb disappears and Faye figures out he staying with Phelan's daughter, Nicola Rubinstein (Nicola Thorp), and Phelan follows Faye, who tells Phelan she is seeking advice from Nicola on bullying. Tim moves Faye away from Weatherfield to stay with his father, Geoff Metcalfe (Ian Bartholomew). Eventually, Faye returns to the street to live with Tim and Sally.

== Reception ==
For her portrayal as Faye, Leach has been nominated twice for Best Young Performance at the British Soap Awards. Leach has also been nominated for Best Young Actor at the 2015 Inside Soap Awards.
