= List of Coronation Street characters introduced in 2017 =

Coronation Street is a British soap opera first broadcast on 9 December 1960. The following is a list of characters introduced in 2017, by order of first appearance. All characters are introduced by series producer Kate Oates. The first notable character that appeared was the stillborn son of Michelle Connor (Kym Marsh) and Steve McDonald (Simon Gregson), Ruairi, in January. Chloe Tipton (Jo-Anne Knowles) first appeared in February as a love interest for Peter Barlow (Chris Gascoyne) and left the series in May. She was followed by Trina Robson (Kerry Bennett), a drug dealer, who appeared in four episodes. The final character to join in February was Oliver Battersby, Steve and Leanne Battersby's (Jane Danson) baby son. Neil Clifton (Ben Cartwright) arrived in March as an acquaintance of Nathan Curtis (Christopher Harper) who became involved in Bethany Platt's (Lucy Fallon) grooming and sexual exploitation storyline. Sally Metcalfe's (Sally Dynevor) online stalker, Leah Buckley (Molly McGlynn), arrived in April, which tied in with the return of Sally's sister, Gina Seddon (Connie Hyde). Pat Phelan's (Connor McIntyre) biological daughter Nicola Rubinstein (Nicola Thorp) arrived in June, alongside Summer Spellman (Matilda Freeman), who is taken in by Todd Grimshaw (Bruno Langley) and Billy Mayhew (Daniel Brocklebank). Moira Pollock (Louiza Patikas), the manager of the Medical Centre and Liz McDonald's (Beverley Callard) new boss, arrived in July. Mary Taylor's (Patti Clare) long-lost son Jude Appleton (Paddy Wallace) moved to Weatherfield in August, bringing his wife, Angie (Victoria Ekanoye), and their baby son, George (Romeo Cheetham-Karcz). In September, Colin Callen (Jim Moir) made his first appearance. In October, Seb's drug-addicted mother, Abi, played by former Shameless actress Sally Carman, first appeared. November introduced Rana Nazir's (Bhavna Limbachia) brother Imran Habeeb (Charlie de Melo), as well as Henry Newton (George Banks), a new love interest for Gemma Winter (Dolly-Rose Campbell).

== Ruairi McDonald ==
Ruairi McDonald
- Coronation Street character
- First appearance: Episode 9076; 11 January 2017
- Last appearance: Episode 9086; 25 January 2017
- Introduced by: Kate Oates
In-universe information
- Father: Steve McDonald
- Mother: Michelle Connor
- Half-brothers: Ali Neeson; Oliver Battersby; Ryan Connor (adoptive)
- Half-sisters: Emma Brooker; Amy Barlow
- Grandfathers: Jim McDonald; Barry Connor
- Grandmothers: Liz McDonald; Helen Connor
- Uncles: Paul Connor; Liam Connor; Andy McDonald
- Aunts: Katie McDonald
- First cousins: Paul Connor Jr. Liam Connor Jr.
- Other relatives: Johnny Connor; Carla Connor; Aidan Connor; Kate Connor; Susie Price

Ruairi McDonald is the son of Steve McDonald (Simon Gregson) and Michelle Connor (Kym Marsh). Ruairi is born prematurely at 23 weeks and dies when he is born. Steve and Michelle are further devastated that Ruairi will not be given a birth or death certificate, as he was born before 24 weeks. Michelle and Steve's marriage is strained and Michelle kicks Steve out when she thinks he does not care about his dead son. However, Michelle allows him back after talking to Steve's mother Liz McDonald (Beverley Callard), who also lost a premature child, Katie, 25 years before. Steve blames himself for Ruairi's death, thinking it is punishment for getting Leanne Battersby (Jane Danson) pregnant six months earlier. Michelle contemplates suicide, unable to cope with life without Ruairi, but is talked out of it by Robert Preston (Tristan Gemmill).

In December 2016, it was announced that the show would tackle the subject of late miscarriage and Michelle and Steve would lose their unborn child. Marsh, who lost her own child at a similar stage in her pregnancy, said "I thought long and hard before agreeing to take on the challenge of this storyline. It is obviously a cause very close to my heart having lost my beautiful Archie at 21 weeks and 5 days. I discussed it with my family and friends, all of who were very supportive. In the end I felt it was an important story to tell in order to raise awareness of something which affects thousands of women every year. I have had to go to some very dark places in my mind whilst filming these heartbreaking scenes but my family, friends and colleagues have been incredible." She added that revisiting feelings in character was "challenging". Producer Kate Oates added "The subject of miscarriage will always be sensitive; but telling this story with Simon and Kym at the centre would always have an extra poignancy" and hoped they "are able to encourage discussion, understanding and compassion for those viewers affected by the loss of a baby. The cast were in safe hands with our amazing and empathetic director Tony Prescott, and it has been humbling to see all the actors involved being so selfless and generous in their performances".

== Chloe Tipton ==
Chloe Tipton
- Coronation Street character
- Portrayed by: Jo-Anne Knowles
- First appearance: Episode 9091; 1 February 2017
- Last appearance: Episode 9165; 15 May 2017
- Introduced by: Kate Oates

Chloe Tipton, played by Jo-Anne Knowles, made her first on-screen appearance on 1 February 2017, before departing on 15 May 2017.

Chloe is a glamorous woman who orders a taxi from Street Cars and finds herself being driven by Peter Barlow (Chris Gascoyne), who has just fallen out with his girlfriend Toyah Battersby (Georgia Taylor). Chloe witnesses Peter and Toyah arguing outside the cab office and when they arrive at her hotel, Chloe asks Peter if he is going back to reconcile with Toyah. Chloe is clearly attracted to Peter and asks to join her for a drink in the hotel. They talk in the bar, where she tells him that she is impulsive and he seems interesting to her. Telling her that he has a family conference to go back to, Peter makes his excuses to leave. Chloe asks him to stay with her, but he refuses and she gives him a generous tip, making it clear that she is unhappy to see him go. A week later, Chloe calls into the cab office and specially requests Peter as her driver to collect her from a dinnertime drinks appointment with a friend, telling him that she would pay him for his extra time and that her divorce would shortly be coming through.

Chloe later deliberately bumps into Peter crying, and tells him that her ex-boyfriend has been following her. He takes her home, where there is obvious sexual tension; however, Peter leaves, forgetting his mobile phone. He then returns to Chloe's house to retrieve it, where they kiss; however, Peter leaves immediately after. It is then revealed that Chloe has downloaded a tracking app on Peter's phone so she can observe his every move. After previously telling her that he is interested in purchasing the local pub The Rovers Return Inn, Chloe unexpectedly arrives and fakes showing an interest in buying the pub, where Peter is unnerved that Toyah may see her. Peter then threatens Chloe in the ginnel, ordering her to leave him and Toyah alone. However, they have been spotted by Peter's father Ken Barlow (William Roache), who takes Chloe inside and she lies to him that she and Peter are having an affair, so Ken informs Toyah of this, leading to her temporarily moving out. The following night, Peter is close to turning back to alcohol after battling alcoholism previously and declares that Ken is at the heart of all his problems. Later that night, Ken is pushed down the stairs by an unknown assailant, with Peter and other members of his family being listed as suspects.

After Peter's son Simon Barlow (Alex Bain) finds a voice message on his phone of Peter apologising and sounding frantic on the night that Ken was pushed down the stairs, everybody automatically assumes that he is behind Ken's attack. However, Peter tells Simon, Toyah and the rest of his family that he was visiting Chloe at the time that Ken was attacked; however, her obsessive behaviour became violent and he pushed her away in self-defence, but she fell and cut her face, and threatened to lie to the police that he punched her. Peter then visits Chloe and pleads that she tell the police the truth, but instead she informs DS MacKinnon (Sandra Huggett) that Peter assaulted her in her own home as a result of their affair, and that this took place the day before Ken's attack, making him prime suspect in the investigation. Peter is later arrested and charged with assaulting Chloe and placed further in the frame for Ken's attack, which adds pressure to his relationship with Toyah.

In the week when Peter is due to stand trial for attacking Chloe, he confides in his ex-wife and Toyah's stepsister, Leanne Battersby (Jane Danson), about how he would never harm a woman and that Chloe is punishing him for something. Leanne subsequently pays Chloe a visit, threatening her to drop the charges; however, Toyah later turns up to achieve the same purpose. Chloe is exceptionally rude towards Leanne and Toyah, and initially refuses to drop the charges against Peter; however, Toyah and Leanne threaten to tell the police that Chloe attacked Toyah by throwing her to the floor, with Leanne offering to provide Toyah with bruises to reinforce their case. Chloe reluctantly agrees to drop the charges; however, she states that Peter could still easily have returned to Weatherfield and pushed Ken down the stairs, which stuns Leanne and Toyah. Peter later receives a phone call informing him that the charges have been dropped by Chloe, and Leanne provides him with a false alibi for the time when Ken was attacked.

== Ronan Truman ==
Ronan Truman
- Coronation Street character
- Portrayed by: Colin Tierney (2017); Alan McKenna (2018)
- Duration: 2017–2018
- First appearance: Episode 9103; 17 February 2017
- Last appearance: Episode 9585; 12 October 2018
- Introduced by: Kate Oates
In-universe information
- Occupation: Drug Lord
- Mother: Patti Truman
- Sons: Cormac Truman

Ronan Trueman, originally played by Colin Tierney, is a man who has made a career dealing in class-A drugs. He interviewed Adam Barlow (Sam Robertson) for a job, the interview was postponed when Ronan was arrested. He was later released. Adam later slept with his girlfriend Trina Robson (Kerry Bennett). Over 2 weeks later, Adam went to Rohan hoping to get a business deal with him only to find out who Trina really was. Adam feared that this would ruin his business deal with Ronan but Trina said he was an old friend of her brother's. Adam offered to sell Ronan drugs and Ronan agreed. Although Ronan was unimpressed when Adam, was delayed by his cousin, Amy (Elle Mulvaney), the deal went ahead but Ronan noticed the tension between Adam and Trina. Ronan turned up on the street and told Adam that he knew about his night with Trina. Ronan threatened Adam with him and his family's lives unless he returned the money given to him for the drugs. Adam agrees to return the money but finds his grandfather Ken (William Roache) burning it. Adam confessed to Ronan that he lost the money resulting in Ronan beating him up and putting him in hospital.

In September 2018, now played by Alan McKenna, Ronan bumps into Adam and asks him to get his son Cormac (Joe Mallalieu) who has just been released from prison for drug use a job. Adam gets him a job working for Robert Preston (Tristan Gemmill). Robert's stepson, Ryan Connor (Ryan Prescott) is an old friend of Cormac's. Cormac is taken in by Robert and his girlfriend Michelle Connor (Kym Marsh). During his stay at Michelle and Robert's, Cormac takes several drugs. While Ryan is out, Cormac overdoses. Ryan calls his brother Ali Neeson (James Burrows), who's a doctor. Ali tells him to call an ambulance. Ryan refuses to do so as he's worried it will land Cormac back in prison. Despite Ali's best efforts to revive him, he is unsuccessful and Cormac dies. The following day, Ronan turns up to see where Cormac died. Michelle, Ali, Robert and Ryan lie saying they called an ambulance but Cormac was already dead. After Ryan's friend, Sophie Webster (Brooke Vincent), who Ryan had previously asked give him a false alibi changes her statement, Ryan is arrested. Ronan's thug PC Duffy (David Maybrick) Ronan and informs him of the news. On Ronan's orders, PC Duffy attempts to poison Ryan and beats him up. After Ryan is released, Michelle goes to see Ronan at Cormac's funeral and asks him to stay away from Ryan. Ronan threatens Michelle and her family. Michelle tells Ryan and Ali they have to leave the country. They pack their bags and drive off unaware that Ronan's watching. He follows on. During a high speed chase, Michelle's car breaks down just as Ronan catches up with them. Ryan decides to face him alone and tries to make Ronan understand that Cormac's death wasn't his fault. Ronan runs Ryan over. He prepares to shoot Michelle and Ali just as Leanne Battersby (Jane Danson) arrive. Ronan unintentionally reverses over Leanne. During an attempt to flee the scene, Ronan swerves off the road and into a tree. Ali hears him screaming for help. He goes to check on Ronan and finds the gun. Ali pulls out a fence post impaled in Ronan's abdomen. Ronan bleeds out and dies. Ali lies and says that Ronan pulled it out himself.

== Trina Robson ==
Trina Robson
- Coronation Street character
- Portrayed by: Kerry Bennett
- First appearance: Episode 9103; 17 February 2017
- Last appearance: Episode 9116; 6 March 2017
- Introduced by: Kate Oates
In-universe information
- Occupation: Receptionist

Trina Robson, played by Kerry Bennett, is a receptionist at Walmsley Croft Solicitors LLP of Weatherfield where Adam Barlow (Sam Robertson) went for a job interview. When the client, Ronan Truman (Colin Tierney), arrived Adam was intrigued about him, but Trina cited her confidentiality clause and refused to give any details, aside from saying he held wild parties. Adam took Trina for a drink to Nick's Bistro where he attempted to get information about Ronan. Adam took her back to his flat for the night.

In January 2017, Bennett was pictured filming scenes with Robertson (Adam Barlow), the same week her departure scenes as Eva Falco in Channel 4 soap opera Hollyoaks had aired.

== Oliver Battersby ==
Oliver Battersby
- Coronation Street character
- Portrayed by: Toby Catley (2017); Emmanuel and Jeremiah Cheetham (2017–2020)
- Duration: 2017–2020
- First appearance: Episode 9106; 20 February 2017
- Last appearance: Episode 10177; 27 November 2020
- Introduced by: Kate Oates
In-universe information
- Father: Steve McDonald
- Mother: Leanne Battersby
- Stepmother: Tracy Barlow
- Half-brothers: Ruairi McDonald; Simon Barlow (adoptive)
- Half-sisters: Emma Brooker; Amy Barlow
- Grandfathers: Les Battersby; Jim McDonald
- Grandmothers: Stella Price; Liz McDonald
- Uncles: Andy McDonald
- Aunts: Eva Price; Toyah Battersby (step)
- First cousins: Susie Price

Oliver Battersby made his first on-screen appearance on 20 February 2017. He is played by twins Emmanuel and Jeremiah Cheetham and was also played by another baby, Toby, in 2017. He is the son of Steve McDonald (Simon Gregson) and Leanne Battersby (Jane Danson). Leanne has a one-night stand with Steve, who was married to Michelle Connor (Kym Marsh).

Leanne has a one-night stand with Steve in June 2016 and falls pregnant. When Steve finds out, he chooses not to be a part of their baby's life in order to protect his relationship with Michelle. Steve tells his mother, Liz McDonald (Beverley Callard) about Leanne's baby and she is hurt by Steve's decision. In August 2016, Leanne reconciles with her ex-husband, Nick Tilsley (Ben Price), and they agree to raise the baby as his. In February 2017, Leanne goes into labour whilst stuck in a lift with her stepsister, Toyah Battersby (Georgia Taylor) and gives birth to her son. The Platt family and Michelle meet him. Leanne tells Nick that she has decided not to put him on the birth certificate, but changes her mind. At a family party organised by Nick's mother, Gail Rodwell (Helen Worth), at The Bistro to celebrate Oliver's birth, Steve announces that he is Oliver's father. Leanne allows Steve to be involved in Oliver's life after Steve decides to involve solicitors. In March 2017, at a meeting with a solicitor, Michelle sends a photo to Nick of Oliver with Liz and Steve taken by Leanne, leaving Nick hurt. Steve arrives at the registry office when Leanne registers Oliver's birth and Steve wants to be named. Nick is upset when he sees Oliver's birth certificate has Steve's name. In April 2017, on Ruairi's due date, Steve takes Oliver to the beach, where he and Michelle scattered Ruairi's ashes, hurting Michelle as she wanted the day to be about Ruairi. Leanne panics when Oliver fails to wake up and is barely breathing. He is rushed to hospital and Steve worries he may have accidentally overdosed Oliver. Oliver is kept in overnight and Nick is hurt when he sees Leanne so close to Steve. In May 2017, Oliver and his family spend a day at the beach to try and resolve the feud between Steve and Nick, but Nick decides to leave Weatherfield in June 2017 and sells the flat. In August 2017, Steve invites Leanne and Oliver to stay with him.

Oliver is central "of an all-encompassing plot" which is "a multi-stranded storyline that involves practically half of Weatherfield". Danson said acting her on-screen birth "was weirdly exhausting" and Leanne's "birth is very, very different from others we have seen on Corrie, but it is Leanne's first baby and the birth situation is not ideal". Danson also added that when Oliver is born, "the realisation that Nick is not his dad hits home" and although Nick "will be there for him and be his dad, but they both know that there is this obstacle and it's become very real. Oliver is a child that is not Nick's yet again, like Simon". Oliver's true paternity will prompt the "decision that Nick's name shouldn't be on the birth certificate as it just doesn't feel right."

In May 2020, Oliver is diagnosed with mitochondrial disease, which then became incurable, risking death. At home when Oliver suffers from a seizure and his medication doesn't work he is rushed to hospital. He is placed on a ventilator when his seizures are relentless. The doctor later tells Leanne and Steve that Oliver is unlikely to ever come off the life support machine as his seizures are continuous, that he cannot breathe on his own, and that there is nothing that can be done for him. As they have been told that it is time to take him off the ventilator when extensive brain damage and other complications are likely to occur, Leanne and Steve try to explore other treatments abroad. In November 2020, after many court hearings, Oliver was ruled out by the judge that treatment was no longer necessary and that his life support would need to be switched off. It was later confirmed that his death scene would air on 27 November 2020. Oliver gets his life support turned off on 27 November 2020, and ultimately passes away in peace around his loved ones.

== Neil Clifton ==
Neil Clifton
- Coronation Street character
- Portrayed by: Ben Cartwright
- Duration: 2017–2018
- First appearance: Episode 9122; 15 March 2017
- Last appearance: Episode 9519; 27 July 2018
- Introduced by: Kate Oates
In-universe information
- Occupation: Police officer
- Wife: Marsha Westbrook (until 2017)
- Daughters: Kayla Clifton

Neil Clifton, played by Ben Cartwright, made his first appearance on 15 March 2017. Cartwright was tempted to turn the role down after reading through the character breakdown, saying "I had major concerns and thought about how it could affect me as a person." After speaking with his friends, he accepted the role.

Neil is a friend of Nathan Curtis (Christopher Harper) and a police officer. Neil takes a shine to Bethany Platt (Lucy Fallon), who he knows Nathan is grooming. Wanting Bethany to himself, Neil pays Nathan a lot of money, but becomes impatient when Nathan repeatedly delays the date Neil can have sex with Bethany. Meanwhile, Neil becomes Craig Tinker's (Colson Smith) mentor at the station. Nathan pretends that Neil is part of his business at Supreme Tanning, and that it is his money that paid for all of Bethany's vlogging equipment. Nathan warns Bethany that she should be kind and polite to Neil, especially after a number of electronic goods supposedly belonging to Neil are stolen from the flat. Suggesting that Bethany make up the loss to Neil by going to dinner with him, Nathan later watches on and does nothing as Neil takes Bethany into the bedroom and rapes her. Neil, Nathan and the other members of the grooming gang are later arrested. Neil tells Craig that he was not actually part of the gang, he was just working undercover. Neil is found guilty of rape and sent to prison.

Neil appeals his sentence and is visited by his daughter Kayla Clifton (Mollie Winnard), who believes that he is innocent and wants to prove it. Neil's appeal request is denied and he is later beaten up by some of the inmates, leading to his hospitalisation. Kayla confronts her father, having realised that he is guilty after all. She asks him to admit to his crime, but he refuses and she has to be restrained from hitting him. Kayla then disowns Neil and leaves.

== Leah Buckley ==
Leah Buckley
- Coronation Street character
- Portrayed by: Molly McGlynn
- First appearance: Episode 9141; 12 April 2017
- Last appearance: Episode 9173; 26 May 2017
- Introduced by: Kate Oates
In-universe information
- Father: Donnie Buckley
- Stepmother: Gina Seddon
- Aunts: Sally Metcalfe

Leah Buckley, played by Molly McGlynn, is the stepdaughter of Gina Seddon (Connie Hyde), the sister of Sally Metcalfe (Sally Dynevor).

Leah turns up to Sally's talk on LGBTQ rights, who is nervous after being targeted by an internet troll. After Sally decides to resign from the council, her daughters, Rosie (Helen Flanagan) and Sophie Webster (Brooke Vincent) find the address of the person who placed an obituary for Sally in the paper. When Leah arrives at the address, Rosie and Sophie confront her and she denies being the troll but her stepmother is to blame and will get her to stop. Leah visits the Websters and asks Rosie and Sophie if Sally is okay. After Sophie tells Rosie about Sally's state, Rosie goes to see Leah and is surprised to spot her aunt, Gina, realising she is Leah's stepmother. Leah admits Gina is the troll and explains she is ill. Leah explains she has become bitter as, while she was there for Sally when she was ill, Sally was not there for Gina. When Rosie threatens to report Gina to the police, Leah counters by threatening to go to the papers about Sally neglecting her sister. Rosie tells Sophie who the troll is and they both go to confront Gina. Gina is pleased to see them, but denies trolling Sally and when Leah arrives, she reveals Gina has bipolar disorder. When Gina goes missing, Rosie and Sophie help Leah find her and Gina visits the street, wanting to talk to Sally but Leah bundles her into the car and drives off. Sally and her husband, Tim Metcalfe (Joe Duttine) visit Leah and Gina and invite them to stay and Sally helps find a home for Leah and Gina. Leah makes plans to go to France with a friend and Tim overhears Leah on the phone, saying how Sally can look after Gina and Tim works out that Leah is the troll. Sally and Tim force Leah to leave but she visits Gina, despite Gina telling Leah she loves Leah as much as her own children, Leah leaves.

The return of Gina was announced in March 2017. Producer Kate Oates explained the circumstances of Gina's return, saying that Sally and Tim will face struggles and "in the midst of all this, though, there will be another face from the Webster past making a return. Sal's girls are back already, but someone else may soon be turning up who will extend the family even further." Leah and Gina will be tracked down by Sally's daughters, Rosie and Sophie.

== Lara Cutler ==
Lara Cutler
- Coronation Street character
- Portrayed by: Niamh Blackshaw
- First appearance: Episode 9176; 31 May 2017
- Last appearance: Episode 9210; 17 July 2017
- Introduced by: Kate Oates

Lara Cutler, played by Niamh Blackshaw, is a young teenage girl who, like Bethany Platt (Lucy Fallon), was being pimped out to older men for sex by Nathan Curtis (Christopher Harper). At one of Nathan's parties, a drunken Bethany believed that Lara had stolen the necklace Nathan had given to her. Despite Lara's protests that Nathan gave jewellery to all his girls, Bethany attacked her and the two were quickly separated by Nathan to ensure Bethany didn't learn any more.

Bethany's uncle, David Platt (Jack P. Shepherd), and Shona Ramsey (Julia Goulding) later track Lara down in order to find somebody to testify against Nathan. They took her for a meal, but she refused to go to the police and ran away before the two could convince her. Lara is killed off screen on 2 October 2017 when she jumps in front of a train. Subsequently, Nathan and his accomplices are sentenced for their crimes.

== Nicola Rubinstein ==
Nicola Rubinstein
- Coronation Street character
- Portrayed by: Nicola Thorp
- Duration: 2017–2019
- First appearance: Episode 9184; 12 June 2017
- Last appearance: Episode 9682; 1 February 2019
- Introduced by: Kate Oates (2017); Iain MacLeod (2019)
In-universe information
- Occupation: Social worker
- Father: Pat Phelan
- Mother: Annabel Rubinstein
- Adoptive father: Isaac Rubinstein
- Stepmother: Eileen Grimshaw
- Sons: Zack Rubinstein

Nicola Rubinstein, played by Nicola Thorp, made her first on-screen appearance on 12 June 2017. She is the daughter of Pat Phelan (Connor McIntyre). She arrived as Seb Franklin's (Harry Visinoni) case worker. Nicola departed on 13 June 2018 at the conclusion of her storyline; however, on 11 November the same year it was announced that Thorp would be returning as Nicola in January 2019. She returned on 21 January 2019 for a few episodes.

When Seb is due to be released from young offenders, she meets with Phelan to encourage him to take Seb on as an apprentice at the building yard, which he agrees to. Nicola questions why Anna Windass (Debbie Rush), the adoptive mother of Seb's girlfriend Faye (Ellie Leach), does not like him. Phelan accompanies Nicola when she takes Seb to Liverpool for a talk by a former young offender. Nicola overhears Phelan talk to a man about her and she demands to know why. Phelan says he knew her parents, Annabel and Isaac. Nicola arranges for Phelan to meet Isaac and Phelan finds a bench dedicated to Nicola's parents, who are deceased. Nicola finds documents Phelan received about her and she confronts Phelan, who admits that he had an affair with her mother and she may be his daughter, but Nicola ridicules Phelan's claims. After talking with Phelan's wife, Eileen (Sue Cleaver), she softens up towards Phelan and they talk; however, she does not want anything to do with him. Seb is sacked by Phelan when Seb finds out Phelan has been reading articles about Nicola. Seb gets Nicola to meet him, pretending the reason he was sacked is because he thinks Phelan is dying. Nicola is furious when she finds out Seb lied. Nicola asks Phelan for them to do a DNA test which confirms he is Nicola's father. Phelan snaps at Nicola when she suggests he donates a mattress from a house he has been secretly keeping Andy Carver (Oliver Farnworth) hostage, but he makes it up to Nicola by buying and donating brand new mattresses. Nicola and a police officer persuade Phelan to consider building a youth centre. Nicola encounters Faye's older brother, Gary Windass (Mikey North), on a night out and Gary confides in Nicola about the dangerous side of his security job. Nicola encourages him to confide in his ex-girlfriend Izzy Armstrong (Cherylee Houston) or his current girlfriend Sarah Platt (Tina O'Brien). When Gary learns that Nicola is Phelan's daughter, he confronts her over this and warns her to stay away from him – leaving Nicola confused. They later meet, however, and unintentionally end up sleeping together. Nicola soon finds out she is pregnant with Gary's baby and later goes to confide this secret to her mother's old neighbour: Lydia Hartman (Susan Twist). She then tells Lydia that Phelan is her biological father and shows her a photograph of being with him; this surprises Lydia, whom Nicola notices is left shaken by this – though Lydia covers up her worries by reassuring Nicola about her reaction. When Seb falls from a ladder and is hospitalized, Nicola ends up being in the same room as Anna and the two quickly bond over his situation as well as confiding to each other about their personal problems. Anna then tells Nicola how Phelan blackmailed her to have sex with him to end him overworking Gary and her former partner, Owen Armstrong (Ian Puleston-Davies), who were once in business with Phelan. Nicola then visits Lydia, who reveals that Phelan raped her mother, and that this is how Nicola was conceived. Nicola then confronts Phelan at her parents' bench, where she continually brands him a rapist for what he did to her mother and Anna, and claims she never wants to see Phelan again.

Nicola returns a few weeks later and makes amends with Phelan, but she lets Gary know that Seb is with her due to him finding out Phelan killed Luke Britton (Dean Fagan) and that she will bring Phelan down. Phelan later finds out about her plan when she is in hospital due to complications with her baby and he tells her never to see her again. Nicola returns to Weatherfield when Phelan supposedly drowns following a confrontation with Eileen on a pier, moving in with Eileen and Seb. After hearing fireworks from the attic set off by Faye, Nicola falls down the stairs and is rushed to hospital where she is gives birth to a baby boy through an emergency caesarean, who she names Zack after her adoptive father, Isaac. A couple of days later, Phelan returns to Weatherfield with a gun and demands to see Zack; however, Nicola stops him. Nicola, Seb and Eileen all attempt to disarm Phelan, but a gunshot rings out. Nicola is revealed to have been shot, and after knocking out Eileen and Seb, Phelan carries her to the bistro for help. Nicola survives, and after Phelan shoots Michelle Connor (Kym Marsh), Phelan is stabbed in the chest and killed by Anna. Nicola later departs Weatherfield with Zack and Eileen to go and build a new life in Bristol.

Nicola Thorp, a former receptionist who made a stand against female dress-codes at work, casting as Nicola Rubinstein was announced in June 2017. A source explained that "Nicola is Seb Franklin's case worker. Phelan knew her mum but wasn't aware they had a child together", but "he recognises Nicola's surname, does the maths and realises the truth. The crux of the story is how she will react, because Nicola was in the dark too." Nicola's arrival "will make Phelan take a good hard look at himself"; however, it's "not certain anything can put Phelan on the straight and narrow." Nicola's "head is understandably all over the place" with the revelation that Phelan is her father and that Phelan's wife, Eileen, "can see how much building a relationship with Nicola means to her husband."

== Summer Spellman ==
Summer Spellman
- Coronation Street character
- Portrayed by: Matilda Freeman (2017–2020); Harriet Bibby (2020–present)
- Duration: 2017–present
- First appearance: Episode 9187; 16 June 2017
- Introduced by: Kate Oates
- Crossover appearances: Corriedale (2026)
In-universe information
- Father: Charlie
- Adoptive father: Drew Spellman; Billy Mayhew (guardian)
- Grandfathers: Angus Spellman (adoptive)
- Grandmothers: Geraldine Spellman (adoptive)

Summer Spellman, played initially by Matilda Freeman, made her first on-screen appearance on 16 June 2017. She is the adoptive daughter of Drew Spellman (Tom Goodwin) and the goddaughter of Billy Mayhew (Daniel Brocklebank). Following a terminally ill Drew's death, Summer is placed in the care of Billy and his boyfriend, Todd Grimshaw (Bruno Langley). In October 2020, it was announced that Freeman had quit her role. Freeman thanked the viewers, cast and crew members, and stated: "After three and a half lovely years I felt it was time for a change and I'm excited to be starting that next chapter with a new role." The role was recast to Harriet Bibby, who had guest roles on Doctors and Brassic prior to joining the soap. On her casting, Bibby commented: "I am so thrilled to be joining the cast of Coronation Street. My family have watched the show for years and I already feel part of the family. Matilda has wished me good luck, which was lovely! I'm looking forward to bringing Summer's sass and sparkle to the screen." Bibby had made her debut appearance as Summer in November 2020.

In 2017, Drew was diagnosed with terminal cancer, and so tried to make sure that Summer would be looked after so that he could go in peace. He and Summer moved to Weatherfield and Drew met up with Billy, now a vicar, asking him to become Summer's guardian. Billy reluctantly declined on account of Todd, who didn't want to be a father, forcing Drew to arrange for his parents to have Summer instead. However, when Billy met Summer, developing an instant rapport with her, he changed his mind and told Drew that he would take Summer on. Billy and Todd were allowed to spend the day with Summer, which went well until Summer overheard Todd cracking jokes about her going into a children's home, making her feel unwanted. That same day, Drew took a bad turn and died from heart failure. A grief-stricken Summer was immediately taken to her new home at Drew's parents'.

Although Summer was miserable at her grandparents', where she was forbidden from talking about Drew, she was resigned to living there until she was sixteen. Her grandmother Geraldine had ordered Billy and Todd not to contact Summer, as she saw Drew as having corrupted her and treated the men with equal contempt. When Summer decided to sue the hospital for negligence, she consulted Adam Barlow (Sam Robertson) at his and Todd's law firm, who palmed her off onto Todd. Todd admitted that she didn't have a case, but the encounter allowed Todd and Summer to patch up their differences. Through Billy, Todd and Summer found out about the rules her grandparents had imposed, and resolved to get Summer away from them for her own good.

Obtaining her address from Adam's case files, Billy and Todd visited Summer's grandparents' house and appealed to the reasonable but her grandfather Angus to do what was best for Summer. When Geraldine made a homophobic attack on Drew's character, Angus put a stop to the proceedings by producing Drew's last will – written three days before he died – making Billy Summer's legal guardian; Geraldine had kept it to herself in order to give Summer a chance at salvation. When all parties agreed to abide by Summer's decision, Summer chose to go with Billy and Todd, following Drew's last wish. Summer then moved in, which Billy and Todd had rented to provide a home for her.

On top of everything else, Summer was still adjusting to her new school and had not made any new friends. When Tracy Barlow (Kate Ford) attempted to pair her with her daughter Amy Barlow (Elle Mulvaney), there and Summer did not get on, with Summer hitting Amy for dissing Drew. Eventually, she fell in with Amy's circle of friends, including Amy's cousin Simon Barlow (Alex Bain) and Asha Alahan (Tanisha Gorey).

In October 2017, Summer tried to show Amy and Asha that she wasn't boring by joining in on their pranking, spraying shaving foam on a teacher's car. Later, she accepted a dare from Simon to smoke a cigarette. The cigarette contained spice, causing Summer to faint. She was found unconscious in the ginnel by Simon and Amy, who got help from Simon's father Peter Barlow (Chris Gascoyne). Fortunately, Summer suffered no lasting ill effects; however, Simon's error in judgement caused Billy to see red and knock Peter to the floor. To keep Summer from being taken into care, Peter took full responsibility for the incident, even after Billy confessed in a bid to clear his conscience.

Billy's confession exposed his role in an armed robbery in Preston. Sixteen years earlier, he and another man had robbed a petrol station at gunpoint and crashed into another car as they made their escape. Although Billy was now a reformed character, he still carried the guilt. When it was identified as the crash that killed Peter's twin sister Susan Barlow (Joanna Foster), Peter got revenge on Billy by contacting Geraldine and advising her that Summer wasn't safe. Summer, expecting to meet a concerned Geraldine, was picked up by Todd who whisked her off to a town by the sea until the situation with Billy blew over. Their disappearance caused Geraldine to report Todd to the police for abducting Summer, leading to a manhunt.

After laying low at a B&B for four weeks, masquerading as father and daughter, Todd and Summer were found by the police. As a distraction, Todd punched one of the police officers thus allowing Summer to flee and meet up with Billy and Todd's mother Eileen Grimshaw (Sue Cleaver). Summer then moved back into the flat with Billy as they waited for Todd to get in touch.

The next few months were no less turbulent for Summer. Following a fall off a cliff during a showdown with Peter regarding Susan's death, Billy was in a wheelchair and in no position to look after Summer. He did recover, but was in constant pain which he made every effort to hide from her. Summer was able to see Geraldine off, throwing her support behind Billy as her legal guardian. She saw it as her job to help Billy through his troubles, and ran herself ragged doing all the household chores until he got better. When she fell behind at school, her teacher met with Billy and Geraldine and Billy was persuaded to give Summer temporarily over to her grandparents. Unaware of Billy's painkiller addiction, Summer did not accept the situation until she had a confrontation with her guardian in the flat, where Billy was drugged-up on heroin and harshly told her to go and live with Geraldine. Instead of her grandparents', Summer went to stay with Eileen and her husband Pat Phelan (Connor McIntyre), wanting to stay close to Billy.

While Summer was staying with Eileen and Phelan, Billy's problems continued. He went missing for two weeks, eventually re-surfacing when the police raided a drugs den. Adam, thinking that Billy had suffered enough for what happened, told the police that Billy was visiting the den in his vocational capacity in order to get him off the hook. Eileen and Summer then arranged with the bishop for Billy to stay at a Christian rehab centre. Summer moved back in with Billy upon his return, and things finally started to get better them.

In April 2018, Summer applied for work experience at UKSA but was turned down, much to her disappointment. A sympathetic Aidan Connor (Shayne Ward) invited her to shadow Alya Nazir (Sair Khan) at Underworld, where Summer proved her aptitude by correcting figures from a supplier which Alya had endorsed. Summer also had a crush on Aidan, and was devastated when he committed suicide several weeks later. Motivated to help others in a similar situation, Summer pitched an idea for a helpline for young men to Aidan's father Johnny Connor (Richard Hawley) and sister Carla Connor (Alison King), calling it "Speak & Save", which Carla agreed to fund through Underworld. The campaign earned Summer a nomination for a Weatherfield Good Samaritan award.

As they had still heard nothing from Todd, Billy allowed himself to fall for Paul Foreman (Peter Ash). Summer supported the relationship, and approved when Paul moved into the flat with them in November 2019.

Producer Kate Oates announced in May 2017 that the show had cast the role of Summer, calling the actress "amazing". She added that it "should be an interesting sight" seeing Todd as a father and says having "two guys bringing up Summer [...] will be a very different dynamic." Brocklebank said that "the dynamic" of Billy and Todd's relationship "will change", although Brocklebank hopes that caring for Summer will bring Billy and Todd "closer together." Brocklebank added that even though Billy and Todd did not have "time to prepare for parenthood", he hopes that their characters "are spontaneous enough to be able to cope with the things that it throws at them." In August 2017, Freeman was longlisted for Best Young Actor at the Inside Soap Awards. She made the viewer-voted shortlist, but lost out to Alfie Clarke, who portrays Arthur Thomas in Emmerdale.

== Moira Pollock ==
Moira Pollock, played Louiza Patikas, made her first on-screen appearance on 12 July 2017 initially appearing until 23 November 2017. The character and casting were announced on 30 June 2017; however, her role in the soap opera remained a secret until her on-screen arrival. Of her casting, Patikas stated: "I'm cock-a-hoop to be working on Coronation Street. It's a fantastic show which I've always loved for its superb writing and iconic characters". After departing in November 2017, Patikas reprised the role beginning 28 February 2018. The character last appeared in January 2020 and Patikas quietly departed the series.

== Cindy Watson ==
Cindy Watson
- Coronation Street character
- Portrayed by: Esther Hall
- Duration: 2017, 2020
- First appearance: Episode 9214; 24 July 2017
- Last appearance: Episode 10005; 12 February 2020
- Introduced by: Kate Oates
In-universe information
- Occupation: Editor
- Husband: Ross Watson

Cindy Watson, played by Esther Hall, appeared between 24 July and 13 October. She is an editor for the Weatherfield Gazette, who encourages Daniel Osbourne (Rob Mallard) to pursue a story about Pat Phelan (Connor McIntyre) and the Calcutta Street scam. Whilst in the cafe, she begins to flirt with Daniel, placing her hand on his thigh and rubbing his leg with her heeled shoe. She explains that she isn't looking for a relationship but rather just a bit of fun. However, upon leaving the cafe alone, she takes out a wedding ring and places it back on her finger. Phelan sees this and realises she is in fact married and later visits Daniel, only to find him having sex with Cindy, and threatens him to stop asking questions about the development. Phelan later schemes for her husband to walk in on Cindy and Daniel dining at the Bistro.

On 12 February 2020, Cindy returns to shut down Alya Nazir (Sair Khan) and Bethany Platt's (Lucy Fallon) attempts to expose Bistro owner Ray Crosby (Mark Frost) in order to avoid being sued for libel. She later hints to Abi Franklin (Sally Carman) that the rumours about Ray are true but refuses to go after him without proof a Ray is one of the paper's main advertisers.

== Angie Appleton ==
Angie Appleton, played by Victoria Ekanoye, made her first appearance on 21 August 2017 and then returned that October. Ekanoye had grown up watching Coronation Street and was very happy being in the soap. Angie was introduced as the wife of Jude Appleton (Paddy Wallace) and the mother of his son, George Appleton (Romeo Cheetham-Karcz). The family arrive to Weatherfield for the wedding of Jude's mother, Mary Taylor (Patti Clare), which is revealed to be a charade to win a competition. The family later move to Weatherfield from their home in South Africa, which Angie is unhappy about. Angie's initial storylines saw her feuding with Mary, and she later suspects that Mary is hurting George after he continuously falls ill whilst under her care. Angie was used to raise awareness of postnatal depression when Angie admits that she is struggling to bond with George. Mary and Angie begin to get along better, but more heartbreak follows for Angie when she finds out that Jude has lied to her for years about his job. The betrayal leads Angie to almost kiss her colleague Adam Barlow (Sam Robertson), who Ekanoye thought would be good for Angie. Despite trying to make it work, Jude and Angie's marriage breaks down and Angie exposes Jude when he lies numerous other times. In December 2018, it was announced that Ekanoye would be departing as Angie, and Angie and George's last episode aired on 7 January 2019. Throughout her 94 episodes on the soap, Angie also enjoyed a friendship with Toyah Battersby (Georgia Taylor). Angie initially had mixed reactions from fans regarding Angie's feud with Mary, with some fans believing that Angie was behaving badly and others sympathising with her. Ekanoye was worried that fans would hate Angie.

== George Appleton ==
George Appleton
- Coronation Street character
- Portrayed by: Romeo Cheetham-Karcz
- Duration: 2017–2019
- First appearance: Episode 9234; 21 August 2017
- Last appearance: Episode 9660; 7 January 2019
- Introduced by: Kate Oates
In-universe information
- Father: Jude Appleton
- Mother: Angie Appleton
- Grandmothers: Mary Taylor

George Appleton, played by Romeo Cheetham-Karcz, made his first on-screen appearance on 22 August 2017. He is the son of Jude Appleton (Paddy Wallace), who is the biological son of Mary Taylor (Patti Clare), and his wife Angie Appleton (Victoria Ekanoye). Cheetham-Karcz is the son of former Waterloo Road actress Zerozha Burt-Skeete, who said of her son's casting that as Coronation Street "is such a massive institution", they "feel very honoured and blessed to have this opportunity for Romeo." Burt-Skeete chaperoned her son on set as "he's been getting used to working alongside Corrie's famous faces and all the cast and crew."

George arrives with Jude and Angie for the wedding of Mary and Norris Cole (Malcolm Hebden). Jude decides that he and Angie are remaining in Weatherfield after coming to terms that Mary was raped, which he was the product of. After Angie pretends that she has been offered her old job back in South Africa, Jude and Angie prepare to leave, but Mary delays them to prevent them going and they end up staying. Mary suspects Angie of being an alcoholic and when Angie drives a sick George to the hospital, Mary phones the police as she believes Angie is drunk; however, a breath test proves Angie is under the limit. Jude is angry with Mary and bans her from seeing George. Mary finds out that Angie is suffering from post-natal depression and when Mary warns Sally Metcalfe (Sally Dynevor) to stop questioning her mental health due to her being elected mayor, Jude and Angie make amends with Mary.

== Imogen Pascoe ==
Imogen Pascoe
- Coronation Street character
- Portrayed by: Melissa Johns
- Duration: 2017–2019
- First appearance: Episode 9242; 3 September 2017
- Last appearance: Episode 9835; 31 July 2019
- Introduced by: Kate Oates

Imogen Pascoe, played by Melissa Johns, is first seen in the Bistro with Kate Connor (Faye Brookes) and Rana Nazir (Bhavna Limbachia). Imogen has an argument with Rana when she feels that Imogen is taking advantage of Kate. She and Kate later start a relationship, much to Rana's jealousy. In early October, Kate and Imogen end their relationship because Kate thinks Imogen is taking it too fast. Imogen later informs Rana of this, and tells her that it is obvious that Rana has feelings for Kate.

Imogen briefly returns in December 2018, after Kate and Rana have split and she and Kate celebrate New Year's together. Imogen makes her final appearance in July 2019, when she meets with Kate and talks to her about her travel experiences, prompting Kate to leave Weatherfield.

== Charlie Franklin ==
Charlie Franklin
- Coronation Street character
- Portrayed by: Jacob Fish
- Duration: 2017–2021
- First appearance: Episode 9245; 10 September 2017
- Last appearance: Episode 10518; 25 December 2021
- Introduced by: Kate Oates (2017); Iain MacLeod (2019–2021)
In-universe information
- Other names: Charlie Boulter
- Mother: Abi Webster
- Adoptive father: Damon Boulter
- Adoptive mother: Lynsey Boulter
- Stepfather: Kevin Webster
- Sisters: Lexi Franklin
- Half-brothers: Seb Franklin; Alfie Franklin

Charlie Franklin (also Charlie Boulter), portrayed by Jacob Fish, is the twin son of Abi Webster (Sally Carman). He, along with Lexi (Jasmine Fish) make their first appearances in episode 9245, originally broadcast on 10 September 2017. They made their last appearance on 25 December 2021.

Charlie and Lexi are Seb Franklin's (Harry Visinoni) young twin siblings. They first appear after Seb returns home to a run-down council house, unaware that he has been followed by Anna Windass (Debbie Rush), the adoptive mother of his girlfriend Faye Windass (Ellie Leach). Anna takes pity on Seb looking after Charlie and Lexi all by himself, so takes the twins back to her house to bath and feed them. After their mother Abi fails to regain custody, the twins are adopted by their foster parents, the Boulters, who then emigrate to Australia, taking the twins with them. In December 2021, Abi's husband Kevin Webster (Michael Le Vell) discovers that Seb had arranged for Abi to be reunited with the twins for Christmas. After Seb was murdered seven months prior, Kevin then takes over the arrangement and Abi is reunited with Charlie and Lexi on Christmas Eve and spends Christmas Day with Abi and Kevin.

== Lexi Franklin ==
Lexi Franklin
- Coronation Street character
- Portrayed by: Jasmine Fish
- Duration: 2017–2021
- First appearance: Episode 9245; 10 September 2017
- Last appearance: Episode 10518; 25 December 2021
- Introduced by: Kate Oates (2018); Iain MacLeod (2019–2021)
In-universe information
- Other names: Lexi Boulter
- Mother: Abi Webster
- Adoptive father: Damon Boulter
- Adoptive mother: Lynsey Boulter
- Stepfather: Kevin Webster
- Brothers: Charlie Franklin
- Half-brothers: Seb Franklin; Alfie Franklin

Lexi Franklin (also Lexi Boulter), portrayed by Jasmine Fish, is the twin daughter of Abi Webster (Sally Carman). She, along with Charlie (Jacob Fish) make their first appearances in episode 9245, originally broadcast on 10 September 2017. They made their last appearance on 25 December 2021.

Charlie and Lexi are Seb Franklin's (Harry Visinoni) young twin siblings. They first appear after Seb returns home to a run-down council house, unaware that he has been followed by Anna Windass (Debbie Rush), the adoptive mother of his girlfriend Faye Windass (Ellie Leach). Anna takes pity on Seb looking after Charlie and Lexi all by himself, so takes the twins back to her house to bath and feed them. After their mother Abi fails to regain custody, the twins are adopted by their foster parents, the Boulters, who then emigrate to Australia, taking the twins with them. In December 2021, Abi's husband Kevin Webster (Michael Le Vell) discovers that Seb had arranged for Abi to be reunited with the twins for Christmas. After Seb was murdered seven months prior, Kevin then takes over the arrangement and Abi is reunited with Lexi and Charlie on Christmas Eve and spends Christmas Day with Abi and Kevin.

== Colin Callen ==
Colin Callen
- Coronation Street character
- Portrayed by: Jim Moir
- First appearance: Episode 9251; 18 September 2017
- Last appearance: Episode 9307; 23 November 2017
- Introduced by: Kate Oates
In-universe information
- Occupation: Marketing executive

Colin Callen, played by Jim Moir, made his first appearance on 18 September 2017. Moir's casting details were announced on 22 May 2017. He was contracted for three months and began filming in July. Of his casting, Moir stated "I've been a lifelong fan of Corrie. In fact, I think I saw the very first one. I try not to miss any episodes. I'm really looking forward to acting in Corrie. It's a real thrill to be part of a British Institution." Colin is a marketing executive for a radio station, who interviews Norris Cole (Malcolm Hebden) and Mary Taylor (Patti Clare) for a Mr. and Mrs. competition.

Mary and Norris are disqualified from the competition after Norris answers his mobile phone. Colin later turns up at The Rovers Return Inn and suggests buying The Kabin newsagents off Norris; however he declines. Unwilling to give up, Colin visits Norris' friend and business partner, Rita Tanner (Barbara Knox), in hospital, after she is diagnosed with a brain tumour. He manipulates Rita into thinking that selling The Kabin would be best for her health and that she should go travelling; however, Norris walks in on Colin and is appalled. Colin leaves Weatherfield with his new partner Moira Pollock (Louiza Patikas).

== Abi Webster ==
Abi Webster
- Coronation Street character
- Portrayed by: Sally Carman
- Duration: 2017–present
- First appearance: Episode 9263; 2 October 2017
- Introduced by: Kate Oates
- Crossover appearances: Corriedale (2026)
In-universe information
- Other names: Abi Franklin
- Occupation: Mechanic
- Husband: Kevin Webster (2021–)
- Sons: Seb Franklin; Charlie Franklin; Alfie Franklin
- Daughters: Lexi Franklin
- Stepsons: Jack Webster
- Stepdaughters: Rosie Webster; Sophie Webster

Abi Webster (also Franklin), portrayed by Sally Carman, made her first appearance on 2 October 2017. She was introduced as the mother of Seb Franklin (Harry Visinoni).

On 28 April 2024, Coronation Street announced their plans for Abi to go through an issue-led based storyline that would see Abi become the victim of deepfake pornography. MacLeod previously announced his plans for the storyline, even including that an "old face" will reappear for Abi. Speaking on the storyline, Carman stated upon seeing the video, it would be "a lot to compute" for Abi as she has no memory of the video, but is aware it could have been taken during a blackout from her past experiences where someone could have had "opportunities" to take advantage of her.

Abi first appears when Anna Windass (Debbie Rush) arrives at her house to help Seb look after his siblings Charlie and Lexi Franklin (Jacob and Jasmine Fish). Seb explains that Abi spends most of her time becoming intoxicated by alcohol and drugs and sleeping the rest of the time. Abi takes an instant dislike to Anna, while Anna is disgusted that Abi allows Seb to look after Charlie and Lexi and go out to work while she helps with nothing. A few weeks later, Abi receives an unexpected visit from Social Services, which appears to go successfully with the help of Seb and Anna. However, after they leave and Seb goes to work, Abi contacts a drug dealer and overdoses on cocaine. She is later found by Seb and his girlfriend, Anna's adoptive daughter Faye Windass (Ellie Leach), who phones for an ambulance. After being resuscitated, Abi refuses to go to a hospital; however, Social Services later return with the police, and take Charlie and Lexi into care, devastating Seb and Faye, while Abi sleeps on the sofa as the drugs administered by the paramedics begin to wear off. Abi is later seen at the hospital with Seb's probation officer Nicola Rubinstein (Nicola Thorp) after Seb falls from a ladder during a window cleaning job.

In May 2021, Seb was murdered in a brutal hate crime attack, which was started by the way his girlfriend Nina Lucas (Mollie Gallagher) was dressed. Since the attack and Seb's death, Abi has wanted justice for Seb, with Kelly Neelan (Millie Gibson) being wrongfully sent down, when the actual killer was Corey Brent (Maximus Evans). Corey was eventually brought to justice in November 2021. In November 2021, Abi marries Kevin Webster (Michael Le Vell). They separate in February when her fling with Imran Habeeb (Charlie De Melo) is exposed. Abi later gives birth to a son she shares with Imran, Alfie.

== PC Jess Heywood ==
PC Jess Heywood
- Coronation Street character
- Portrayed by: Donnaleigh Bailey
- Duration: 2017–2018, 2021–2023, 2025–present
- First appearance: Episode 9283; 25 October 2017
- Introduced by: Kate Oates
In-universe information
- Occupation: Police Officer

PC Jess Heywood played by Donnaleigh Bailey, made her first appearance on the 25 October 2017. The character was introduced as the mentor and later on colleague for Craig Tinker (Colson Smith). She later helps Craig how to handle work life with OCD. Jess continued to make sporadic appearances, throughout 2021 to 2023. Mainly involved with the police or Craig. On 27 March 2025, it was revealed that Donnaleigh Bailey would reprise her role for Craig's exit storyline.

On 19 February 2026, it was revealed that Bailey would return again, which she said she was "forever grateful" for. She posted a series of selfies and captioned: "Time on my favourite street playing my favourite copper Jess. Some lovely stuff coming up on your teleboxes." She also commented in a follow-up clip that she was "busy filming and keeping the street of Weatherfield safe". She continued: "One of my favourite things to do is take a walk on the cobbles. It really inspires me, and I just think, how lucky am I to work in the most amazing places ever, the nation's favourite soap. It's incredible and I'm grateful every day."

== Imran Habeeb ==
Imran Habeeb
- Coronation Street character
- Portrayed by: Charlie De Melo
- Duration: 2017–2022
- First appearance: Episode 9302; 17 November 2017
- Last appearance: Episode 10,655; 3 June 2022
- Introduced by: Kate Oates
In-universe information
- Occupation: Lawyer
- Father: Hassan Habeeb
- Mother: Saira Habeeb
- Sisters: Rana Habeeb
- Wife: Sabeen Habeeb (backstory); Toyah Battersby (2022)
- Sons: Alfie Franklin
- Adoptive daughters: Kelly Neelan (foster); Elsie (foster)

Imran Habeeb, played by Charlie De Melo, made his first appearance on 17 November 2017. The character was introduced as Rana Nazir's (Bhavna Limbachia) brother for her wedding episodes. Producers later decided to promote the character to the main cast. On 2 March 2022, it was announced that de Melo has quit his role and Imran departed in the episode broadcast on 1 June 2022 when he dies of a cardiac arrest following a car crash.

Imran attends his sister Rana's marriage to Zeedan Nazir (Qasim Akhtar). His presence at the wedding delights Rana's friend, Alya Nazir (Sair Khan), who he likens to a second sister, but irritates her boyfriend Luke Britton (Dean Fagan). While waiting for Rana to arrive, Imran comments that Zeedan's trainers look horrible and implies that they will not be suitable for the wedding. Imran lets Zeedan borrow his Italian leather shoes as a way of calming his nerves about the wedding. At the after party, Imran reveals to Rosie Webster (Helen Flanagan) that he is a solicitor, who specialises in criminal law. Rosie tells Imran that she works for fellow solicitor Adam Barlow (Sam Robertson). When Imran says that Adam is not as good as him, Rosie's sister Sophie Webster (Brooke Vincent) jokes that the two should meet as they would probably get along with each other. A month later, Imran moves to Coronation Street permanently after splitting up with his wife Sabeen. He soon starts working with Adam at his law firm.

In 2018, Imran embarks on a relationship with Toyah Battersby (Georgia Taylor). In 2021, they foster Kelly Neelan (Millie Gibson). Kelly is later wrongfully charged with Seb Franklin's (Harry Visinoni) murder. During her time in prison, Imran and Toyah foster another child, a girl named Elsie. In October 2021, Imran has a one-night stand with Seb's mother Abi Franklin (Sally Carman), resulting in Abi getting pregnant and, in 2022, giving birth to their son, Alfie Franklin. After a long battle, Imran and Toyah get custody of baby Alfie, which included Imran lying and stitching Abi up by hiring colleague Ben Chancellor (Jon-Paul Bell) to take pictures of her supposedly doing a drug deal for evidence in the custody battle; however, this turns out to be Abi paying off an old friend Dean (Anthony Crank) to stay away from her. (Dean had caused trouble for Abi earlier in the year). In June 2022, Imran and Toyah caught on to the fact that Abi is planning to flee abroad with Baby Alfie. Toyah considers going to the police. Imran's guilty conscience took hold as he eventually persuaded Toyah against getting the police involved. The pair were on their way home when a crash occurred with them in the car. Imran later dies of a cardiac arrest caused by the crash and Toyah survived, but ended up in hospital. Hours earlier Kevin Webster (Michael Le Vell) tampers with the car which leads him to be under suspicion of the police and he gets taken to the police station for questioning.

In 2021, De Melo was longlisted in the Serial Drama Performance at the 26th National Television Awards and received a nomination for Best Actor at the Inside Soap Awards. He was also longlisted for Best Leading Performer at the 2022 British Soap Awards, and again for Serial Drama Performance at the 27th National Television Awards.

== Henry Newton ==
Henry Newton
- Coronation Street character
- Portrayed by: George Banks
- Duration: 2017–2018, 2023
- First appearance: Episode 9306; 22 November 2017
- Last appearance: Episode 11,050; 4 September 2023
- Introduced by: Kate Oates (2017); Iain MacLeod (2023)
In-universe information
- Father: Philip Newton
- Sisters: Helen Newton
- Wife: Cressida Lanscombe (2018–2023)
- Grandfathers: Cecil Newton

Henry Newton, played by George Banks, made his first appearances on 22 November 2017. He was introduced as a love interest for Gemma Winter (Dolly-Rose Campbell). Henry is also the son of Philip Newton and the grandson of the former Newton & Ridley director, Cecil Newton.

Gemma Winter attends a party and catches the attention of Henry by stealing an ornament and writing "pie in a tin" onto a shopping list. Henry decided to speak to Gemma and was charmed by her quirks of stashing snacks in ovens and her references to pies. Gemma pretended that her name was Jemima and led Henry to believe that she was a nurse. When the police arrived at the party, Gemma rushed out, believing that they were going to arrest her for stealing the ornament. Henry was upset not to have got Gemma's number but noticed that she had left her shoe behind and decided to seek her out in Weatherfield.

Henry called in to The Kabin and asked Norris Cole (Malcolm Hebden) if he knew of anybody called Jemima who was really sweet, in their twenties and had a lovely laugh. Norris told Henry that Jemima was far too posh a name for Coronation Street and that he may have more luck in a different area of town. Norris later realised who Henry was referring to and led him to the Rovers, where Gemma was speaking to Liz McDonald (Beverley Callard) about her time at the party. Henry later suggested that they should meet up again and complimented Liz on a "fantastic little boozer". Recognising who he was, Liz informed Gemma that Henry was Cecil Newton's grandson and that she had landed on her feet with a relationship with him.

== Other characters ==
Character	Date(s)	Actor	Circumstances
Giles Gove	2 January	Jack Chissick	Giles is a potential purchaser for Roy's Rolls and its flat when Roy Cropper (David Neilson) put the premises up for sale, following the cancellation of his wedding to Cathy Matthews (Melanie Hill). Later on, Brian Packham (Peter Gunn) gets Sally Metcalfe (Sally Dynevor) to lie to Roy that she knows Giles from her council work. Sally tells Roy that Giles will turn the cafe into an amusement arcade and that he was transphobic, two things Roy hates, in the hope that he will cancel the sale.
Hostel Worker	2 January	Jackie Knowles	The Hostel Worker helped Billy Mayhew (Daniel Brocklebank) when he tried to put a roof over the head of a homeless Shona Ramsey (Julia Goulding). While the two were distracted, Shona stole her purse from her open handbag and did a runner. When Billy eventually tracked Shona down, she described the worker as a jobsworth, saying she could spot the nice ones a mile off and she definitely didn't fit the bill.
Barman	2 January	Chris Barlow	The Barman worked in premises that was frequently visited by homeless thief Shona Ramsey (Julia Goulding) who Billy Mayhew (Daniel Brocklebank) was trying to take under his wing. Billy visited the bar to find her and was told by the barman that although it was his first shift there he had been warned about her and asked Billy to tell him if she came in so that he could evict her. Billy loosely promised to do so and ordered a pint from the man while he waited.
Peggy	4–6 January	Shanice Stewart Jones	Peggy is a friend of Steph Britton's (Tisha Merry), who visits her to talk about her break up with her boyfriend. Robert Preston (Tristan Gemmill) snaps at Steph for sitting around and talking. Peggy, oblivious to his manner, is taken with his looks and asks Steph if he is single. Steph initially is not keen on the thought of her friend dating her boss, but she changes her mind and persuades the two to go on a date together. Robert is reluctant, but he goes along with the idea nevertheless.
Midwife	9–13 January	Nicola Sanderson	The Midwife attends to Michelle Connor (Kym Marsh) when she is taken to Weatherfield General after suffering pains in her abdomen during her pregnancy. She then assists another midwife at the birth of the stillborn boy, who Michelle and her husband Steve McDonald (Simon Gregson) named Ruairi. Michelle is placed in a bereavement suite to recover from the birth and death. When Michelle is informed that no birth or death certificate will be issued, she takes her temper out on the midwife, snapping at her when she is told how she understood what she is going through, only for her to reply that she herself has suffered a still birth in the past. Michelle is allowed time to be with the baby before he is taken to the chapel of rest by the midwife, who gives her a leaflet offering information and support, something that gave her some comfort.
Doctor	11–13 January	Anita Vettesse	The Doctor attends to a pregnant Michelle Connor (Kym Marsh), and advises that she is kept in overnight for observation. When Michelle's waters break, the doctor tells her and her husband Steve McDonald (Simon Gregson) that the labour cannot be stopped, even though the baby is underdeveloped. The doctor assists at the birth, where baby Ruairi is born lifeless. The next day, the doctor explains that birth and death certificates will not be issued, as the baby was born too early. She offers to talk to Michelle, but Steve chooses to tell her himself.
Truck Driver	11 January	John McGrellis	The Truck Driver delivers a new pick-up vehicle for Webster's Autocentre to Andy Carver (Oliver Farnworth), who is posing as Kevin Webster (Michael Le Vell).
Bailiff	11 January	Danny Ryder	The Bailiff and his colleagues execute a warrant against the debts of Sharif Nazir (Marc Anwar) by repossessing items from V Court Fitness of which he was part owner. Another of the owners, Dev Alahan (Jimmi Harkishin) protests, but is unable to stop them. Sharif's grandson Zeedan (Qasim Akhtar) tried to stop proceedings by himself taking a sewing machine that his sister, Alya (Sair Khan), had bought with money she had taken from her grandfather, but she refuses to part with the item. The repossession effectively puts the gym out of business.
Fire Investigator	18 January	Steven Hillman	The Fire Investigator carries out an inspection of the bodyshop of Webster's Autocentre after it is burnt down. He quickly finds the keys to the premises on the floor. He later breaks the news to Kevin Webster (Michael Le Vell) and Tyrone Dobbs (Alan Halsall) that he is handing the matter over to the police, as he is sure that it is a case of arson.
Nancy Briers	27 January	Alice Barlow	Nancy Briers is a waitress at Nick's Bistro. She previously went out on a date with Luke Britton (Dean Fagan), who said that he "might" text her later. However, he later tells her that he is going out with Tracy Barlow (Kate Ford). Nancy, who has feelings for Luke, tries her best to woo him, especially when he walks out of the bistro on Tracy's birthday when she confesses to him that she murdered her boyfriend Charlie Stubbs (Bill Ward). Nancy teases Tracy over her split with Luke until Luke returns to the bistro, and tells Tracy that because of her honesty, he's now madly in love with her. Nancy, enraged, makes insulting remarks at Tracy and Luke, which results in Tracy lashing out at her. Nancy's boss, Robert Preston (Tristan Gemmill), walks in seeing the two fighting, and immediately fires Nancy.
Shanice	30 January	Simone Holmes	Shanice is a massage therapist employed at a spa, which is visited by Leanne Battersby (Jane Danson), Eva Price (Catherine Tyldesley) and Toyah Battersby (Georgia Taylor). Leanne is her first appointment and she notices the advanced state of her pregnancy. Shanice tells Leanne that they had better get on with the massage before the baby arrives. She adds that being a mother is the best thing Leanne will ever do. Credited as "Massage Therapist", the character's name Shanice was given in dialogue.
Emma	3 February	Jacqueline Roberts	Emma is a cancer survivor who knew Sally Metcalfe (Sally Dynevor) from a group at the clinic she attended. Sally had been given another "all-clear" as part of her annual check after having had breast cancer and mentioned to Jenny Bradley (Sally Ann Matthews) that it was difficult getting good mastectomy bras. Jenny designed and made a prototype of a garment that would have function while not forgoing style and Sally organised for Emma to visit the factory and see the item.
Rachel	3 February–6 March	Leanne Rowley	Rachel is a journalist who knew Emma (Jacqueline Roberts). Rachel and Emma visited the factory to see the garment that Jenny Bradley (Sally Ann Matthews) had designed.
Richard Drake	3–24 February	Colin R. Campbell	Richard is a clothing wholesaler of RJD Textiles and a potential client of Underworld. He had a fearsome reputation in the business and was one of the few people who unnerved Johnny Connor (Richard Hawley).
Jemima Corey	3–24 February	Katey Brennand	Jemima is the assistant to Richard Drake (Colin R. Campbell), a hard-nosed clothing wholesaler of RJD Textiles and a potential client of Underworld.
Police Officers	6 February	Karl Haynes and Ian Mairs	The police officers raid Kevin Webster (Michael Le Vell) and Anna Windass' (Debbie Rush) home following Rosie (Helen Flanagan) and Sophie Webster's (Brooke Vincent) arrival. Telling them that they have a warrant to search the premises, they begin to look around the house and they find a bag of white powder. The officers assume it is cocaine. The two girls are arrested and taken to Weatherfield Police Station, where they are separately questioned. Rosie tells the officer that she came home, as she is spontaneous in nature and her boyfriend Antoine had paid for it. She strenuously denies taking any illegal drugs and when the powder is proved to be tea sweetener, the girls are released.
Neighbour	8 February	Christine Dalby	The Neighbour lives at Clement Attlee Court on a sink estate in Weatherfield where Greg, a friend of Rosie Webster's (Helen Flanagan) boyfriend from the United States lives. Rosie and Sophie go to the estate and find Greg's house is boarded up. The neighbour tells them that he was arrested the previous day on suspicion of drug possession.
Gus Radcliffe	13 February	Kim Wall	Gus Radcliffe is a friend of Ken Barlow (William Roache) and a lecturer on the MA course for literature, culture and modernity that Ken's son Daniel Osbourne (Rob Mallard) wanted to study on. Ken arranged to meet Gus at The Rovers so that they could talk about the course; however, Daniel didn't turn up.
Man	13 February	Adam Stevens	The man is a customer at The Rovers who set his sights on lesbian Kate Connor (Faye Brookes) and already married Rana Nazir (Bhavna Limbachia); however, he began talking to Mary Taylor (Patti Clare).
Zack	27 February–3 March	Nate Fellows	Zack is a builder who wolf-whistled at Rosie (Helen Flanagan) and Sophie Webster (Brooke Vincent) while they were cleaning windows. Rosie appreciated the attention; however, Sophie did not. Their mother, Sally Metcalfe (Sally Dynevor), later got involved and branded Zack "sexist" and made a complaint about him to his foreman.
Foreman	1–6 March	Grant Burgin	Sally Metcalfe (Sally Dynevor) approached the foreman of the building site and made a complaint about Zack's (Nate Fellows) sexist behaviour.
Mrs. Kitchen	17 April	Pauline Jefferson	Mrs. Kitchen is a regular customer at Audrey's Salon. David Platt (Jack P. Shepherd) mentions that she is a difficult customer.
Kim Vaughan	19 April 2017–15 June 2018 (6 episodes)	Tom Shaw	Kim is an old friend of Fiz Stape (Jennie McAlpine), with whom she was in care. Fiz goes to meet with him where it is revealed he is now a lecturer. Fiz's boyfriend Tyrone Dobbs (Alan Halsall) becomes jealous of Kim, but it is later revealed that Kim is gay.
Drew Spellman	24 April–19 June	Tom Godwin	Drew is an ex-boyfriend of Billy Mayhew (Daniel Brocklebank). Drew who had recently discovered he only had a few months to live turned up asking Billy if he would take over the duties of his adoptive daughter Summer (Matilda Freeman) and be her legal guardian.
Mike	26 April	Dave Galbraith	Mike is a supposed friend of Nathan Curtis (Christopher Harper). Bethany Platt (Lucy Fallon) lets Mike into Nathan's flat to collect some camera equipment apparently which Nathan agreed. Nathan returns and puts on a show of anger to Bethany, saying the equipment has been stolen, and she is to blame
Ian Yardley	5 May–4 October	Anthony Bowers	Ian is friend of Nathan Curtis (Christopher Harper) and Neil Clifton (Ben Cartwright). After months of preparation, Nathan had perfectly manipulated his girlfriend Bethany Platt (Lucy Fallon) enough in order for him to be able to sell her around for sex. After Neil slept with Bethany during one of Nathan's parties, Ian wanted his turn and was immediately introduced to the vulnerable teenager. Nathan soon organised another party, during which Ian would be able to sleep with a drunken Bethany but the plans were dashed when Bethany's mother Sarah Platt (Tina O'Brien) and her boyfriend Gary Windass (Mikey North), unaware of Nathan's true intentions, found Bethany unconscious and intoxicated in Nathan's flat and took her home. Furious, Ian took back his money from Nathan and left. He was found guilty in court in October 2017.
Postman	24 May	Tony Nyland	The postman delivered three letters to 15a Coronation Street and bored an uninterested Daniel Osbourne (Rob Mallard) with a rambling tale of a customer who had had to pay for an un-stamped letter, only to find that it contained unwanted junk mail about tools.
Roxy Ward	14–28 August	Claudia Adshead	Roxy and Zoe are old friends of Gemma Winter (Dolly-Rose Campbell), who instantly cause trouble between her and her flatmate Rita Tanner (Barbara Knox). After finding the alarm code for The Kabin, both Roxy and Zoe break in and burgle it. Zoe reappears days later to inform Gemma that the police have been around, and warns her for being a grass. She later overhears Shona Ramsey (Julia Goulding) announcing she has just won £6,000 on a scratchcard – so calls Macca Hibbs (Gareth Berliner) to let him know.
Zoe White	14–28 August	Keeley Fitzgerald	
Dane Hibbs	10 September–9 October	Simon Naylor	Dane is the father of Clayton Hibbs (Callum Harrison) and the stepfather of Macca (Gareth Berliner), and is first seen spying on Shona Ramsey (Julia Goulding) and David Platt (Jack P. Shepherd). Shona later meets Dane in the ginnel, where Dane attempts to persuade Shona to give Clayton her winnings on a scratchcard. Dane later states that he will return when Shona is in more of a giving mood. In February 2019, when Shona visits Clayton in prison, she reveals that Dane has died of a drug overdose, which Clayton already knows about.
Fiona Crowley	23 October 2017	Emma Matthews	A social worker who has Abi Franklin's (Sally Carman) twins Charlie and Lexi Franklin (Jacob and Jasmine Fish) taken into care.
Matt Luscombe	4–6 December 2017, 5 January 2018	Sebastian Shaw	Matt is an old friend of Andy Carver (Oliver Farnworth), who Luke Britton (Dean Fagan) contacts as he wants to know where Andy is. Matt meets with Luke and he reveals that he has been in Weatherfield since June and has left several messages for Andy. Luke asks if Andy has been staying in Bristol, but Matt denies this and says that he had never planned to visit. Matt gives Luke a wedding invitation to pass on to Andy. Pat Phelan (Connor McIntyre) informs Matt that Luke is dangerous and is planning revenge on Andy for breaking up with his sister. Thinking he is protecting his friend, Matt returns to tell Luke that Andy has been in touch to tell him that he has gone backpacking around Belize, and he will not be returning to Weatherfield.
Chris Anderton	18–20 December	Oliver Walker	Chris is a guest staying at The Rovers Return Inn public house. After Leanne Battersby (Jane Danson) has an unsuccessful date with Matthew Singh, Eva Price (Catherine Tyldesley) sets her up with Chris. Sarah Platt (Tina O'Brien) discovers that Chris' real name is Paul after reading the name stated on his credit card. Sarah, Liz McDonald (Beverley Callard), Steve McDonald (Simon Gregson) and Toyah Battersby (Georgia Taylor) head to Nick's Bistro to warn Leanne about Chris. When they arrive, they discover that Chris has done a runner. Leanne later reads her bank statements and is left horrified when she discovers that Chris has conned her out of over £25,000.
