= Charlie De Melo =

English actor (born 1989)

- Born: Charles Alexander De Melo; 26 September 1989 (age 36); Barnstaple, Devon, England
- Occupation: Actor
- Years active: 2012–present
- Television: Coronation Street

Charles Alexander De Melo (born 26 September 1989) is an English actor. From 2017 to 2022, he portrayed the role of Imran Habeeb on the ITV soap opera Coronation Street, for which he was nominated for the British Soap Award for Best Leading Performer.

== Life and career ==
De Melo was born on 26 September 1989 in Barnstaple, Devon, and later moved to London, where he attended the University of London. He graduated from ArtsEd in 2012, and appeared in the 2012 short films Rewind and Innocence. In 2013, he appeared as Tamir Niaz in an episode of the BBC soap opera Doctors. In 2014, he portrayed Josh Ware in an episode of Casualty, and in 2015, De Melo was cast in the BBC One drama series The Interceptor as Martin, a former MI6 agent and a member of the UNIT team. In 2016, he appeared in the direct-to-video sequel Jarhead 3: The Siege. In 2017, De Melo appeared in EastEnders as PC Jaz Jones on a recurring basis, appearing in five episodes. Later that year, he provided additional voices for the video game Need for Speed Payback.

In November 2017, De Melo joined the cast of the ITV soap opera Coronation Street as Imran Habeeb. The character was introduced as the brother of established character Rana Habeeb (Bhavna Limbachia) and arrives to attend Rana's wedding. The character returned in January 2018, after being promoted to a regular character, with storylines including his relationship with Toyah Battersby (Georgia Taylor), a one-night stand with Abi Franklin (Sally Carman which results in Abi getting pregnant and a custody battle for their son. In March 2022, it was announced that De Melo had decided to leave the soap, and Imran was killed off after sustaining injuries in a car accident and ultimately dying of cardiac arrest in scenes broadcast in June 2022. Following his exit from the soap, De Melo starred in a theatre adaptation of The Clothes They Stood Up In, based on the 2001 book by Alan Bennett, and in 2023, he appeared as Borachio in the play Much Ado About Nothing.

== Filmography ==
Year	Title	Role	Notes	Ref.
2012	Rewind	Harry	Short film	
2012	Innocence	Unknown	Short film	
2013	Doctors	Tamir Niaz	Episode: "Where the Truth Lies"	
2014	Casualty	Josh Ware	Episode: "Valves to Vigrants"	
2015	The Interceptor	Martin	Main role	
2016	Jarhead 3: The Siege	Jamal	Direct-to-video film	
2017	EastEnders	PC Jaz Jones	Recurring role	
2017	Need for Speed Payback	Unknown	Video game (voice role)	
2017–2022	Coronation Street	Imran Habeeb	Series regular	
2023	Still Up	Milo	Episode: "The Wedding"	
2023	Doctor Who	Charlie Banerjee	Episode: "The Giggle"	
2024	Rivals	Malhar Verma	3 episodes	
2024	Ellis	Leo Braxton	Episode: "Brindleton"	
2025	The Chelsea Detective	Taymoor Bukhari	Episode: "For the Greater Good"	
2026	Half Man	Alby	Recurring role	

== Stage ==
Year	Title	Role	Venue	Ref.
2022	The Clothes They Stood Up In	Mr Anwar/Sarge/Nurse	Nottingham Playhouse	
2023	Much Ado About Nothing	Borachio	Shakespeare's Globe	

== Awards and nominations ==
Year	Award	Category	Result	Ref.
2018	TV Choice Awards	Best Soap Newcomer	Nominated	
2021	National Television Awards	Serial Drama Performance	Nominated	
2021	Inside Soap Awards	Best Actor	Nominated	
2022	British Soap Awards	Best Leading Performer	Nominated	
2022	National Television Awards	Serial Drama Performance	Nominated	
