= Joe Duttine =

English actor (born 1970)

- Born: Jonathan Duttine; 30 June 1970 (age 56); Halifax, England, United Kingdom
- Other name: Jo Duttine
- Occupation: Actor
- Years active: 1992–present
- Spouse: Sally Carman (m. 2022)
- Children: 3

Joe Duttine (born Jonathan Duttine; 30 June 1970), sometimes credited as Jo Duttine, is a British film, theatre and television actor from Halifax, England.

He currently plays Tim Metcalfe in Coronation Street. He is also known for his role in Shameless as Cameron Donnelly, the father of Maxine.

== Early life ==
Duttine was born in Halifax. His father, Geoffrey, is the brother of actor John Duttine, whose name prohibited his nephew ’Johnny’ using his real name and having to change it to ‘Joe’.

Joe moved to London and attended the Drama Centre London from 1989–1992, where he studied Stanislavski's system of method acting alongside actors Craig Kelly and John Simm.

== Career ==
Duttine made his television debut in 1992 appearing in the television series Between the Lines. Duttine has appeared in over 25 television roles including the television series Pie in the Sky, as Steve Turner in 21 episodes, (1994–1995); opposite Martin Kemp in the series Serious and Organised, appearing as D.C. Tony Finn; appearing as Craig Tate in Blood Sweat, and Tears; Life on Mars, as Malcolm Cox in one episode (2006); and HolbyBlue, as Toby Wilson in one episode (2008). He played DS Carr in Coronation Street, and miner Colin Farr in "UnderWorld" episode of Dalziel and Pascoe. He has also made appearances in Waterloo Road as Andy Harker, and Shameless as Cameron Donnelly. In 2013 he reappeared in Coronation Street as Tim Metcalfe, the father of Faye Windass, and was cast as Rutter in the major BBC series The Village. He is also known for his collaborations with BAFTA Award nominated actor John Simm, whom he met at drama school. They have appeared together in television shows such as Life on Mars, The Village and Scott and Bailey.

He has also appeared in several films such as the 2001 comedy-drama The Navigators, playing the role of Paul.

He also appeared as narrator of Channel 5 series On Benefits, a documentary series about people living on welfare.

== Filmography ==
Year	Title	Role	Notes
1993	Lovejoy	Ron Noakes	
1994-1995	Pie in the Sky	Steve Turner	21 episodes
1996	Hillsborough	Policeman	N/A
1996	My Night with Reg	Eric	Film
1997	Silent Witness	Craig	Guest role, ("Cease upon the Midnight")
1998	Dalziel and Pascoe	Colin Farr	Episode: "Under World"
1999	G:MT – Greenwich Mean Time	Mick	
2001	The Navigators	Paul	Film
2003	The Inspector Lynley Mysteries	Chris Faraday	Episode: "Playing for the Ashes"
2004	Silent Witness	DCI Chris Hollander	Episode: "Nowhere Fast"
2006	Life on Mars	Malcolm Cox	Episode 5
2006	New Tricks	Matthew Benton	Episode: "Ice Cream Wars"
2009	Waterloo Road	Andy Harker	Guest role; 1 episode (Series 4)
2009	Inspector George Gently	Patrick Fuller	Episode: "Gently Through the Mill"
2010	Shameless	Cameron Donnelly	2 episodes (Series 7)
2010	Coronation Street	D.S. Carr	Recurring role, 23 episodes
2010	Casualty	Frank Simons	Episode: "No Place Like Home"
2010	Waterloo Road	John Adams	Guest role; 1 episode (Series 6)
2012	Scott & Bailey	Michael Nash	1 episode
2012	The Syndicate	Boss	1 episode
2012	Casualty	Sgt Gary Poulter	2 episodes
2013–present	Coronation Street	Tim Metcalfe	Series regular
2013	Foyle's War	Frank Shaw	Episode: "The Eternity Ring"
2013	The Village	Rutter	Main role

== Personal life ==
He married Sally Carman, his Coronation Street co-star who plays Abi Franklin in 2022.

Duttine has three children with a former partner.
