= Nicola Thorp =

British actress

- Born: Nicola Sian Thorp; Blackpool, England
- Other name: Nicola Sian
- Years active: 2012–present
- Spouse: Nikesh Patel (m. 2024)
- Children: 1

Nicola Sian Thorp (born 1988) is an English broadcaster, columnist, activist, and former actress. She is known for her role as Nicola Rubinstein in the ITV soap opera Coronation Street (2017–2019), as well as her contributions to the newspaper Metro and the programmes This Morning and Talk Today.

== Early life and education ==
Nicola Sian Thorp was born in Blackpool, England. Her family run a Blackpool rock factory founded by her grandfather in 1962. Thorp attended Arnold School, where she served as deputy head girl. She studied acting at the Arts Educational School (ArtsEd) in London from 2007 to 2010.

== Career ==
In 2018, Thorp competed for ITV in Sport Relief's "Clash of the Channels" boat race, and started writing a regular column for freesheet Metro.co.uk, her first focusing on period poverty for women. Since 2019, Thorp has also been a regular contributor for This Morning.

=== Coronation Street ===
Thorp began appearing in Coronation Street as Nicola Rubinstein on 12 June 2017 as street villain Pat Phelan's (Connor McIntyre) daughter. Thorp's last appearance as Nicola Rubinstein was on 13 June 2018 at the conclusion of her storyline. On 11 November 2018, it was announced that Thorp would be reprising her role as Nicola, and she returned from 21 January to 1 February 2019.

=== Music ===
In 2018, Thorp joined 26 other celebrities at Metropolis Studios, to perform an original Christmas song called Rock With Rudolph, written and produced by Grahame and Jack Corbyn. The song was recorded in aid of Great Ormond Street Hospital, and was released digitally through independent record label Saga Entertainment on 30 November 2018 under the artist name The Celebs. The music video debuted exclusively with The Sun newspaper online on 29 November 2018, and had its first TV showing on Good Morning Britain on 30 November 2018. The song peaked at number two on the iTunes pop chart.

== Activism ==
Thorp made headlines in 2016 after going public about an experience she had at PricewaterhouseCoopers as a temp worker: she stated she was sent home unpaid from her work as a temp receptionist in London after refusing to wear high heels, a requirement mandated by her agency's "female grooming" policies at the time. An online petition that she started to highlight the situation was subsequently signed by nearly 110,000 people in less than 48 hours. The petition gained support from the media and members of parliament, including Margot James, Caroline Dinenage, and Tulip Siddiq. Thorp appeared on Good Morning Britain to talk about her petition and clashed with host Piers Morgan. Thorp later appeared in front of a Parliamentary select committee to discuss the issue, and wrote articles in newspapers laying out her stance that she is not anti-high heels, but merely that it should not be necessary for certain jobs. As a result, the temp agency Portico changed its rules.

Thorp supported and campaigned for the Labour Party in the run-up to the 2019 general election, believing a Labour government would revitalise seaside towns such as Blackpool. Thorp also hosted her own podcast on the disappearance of missing teenager Charlene Downes who went missing in 2004

In January 2024, Thorp highlighted the humanitarian crisis in Gaza, sharing a link to the United Nations Sexual and Reproductive Health Agency (UNFPA).

== Personal life ==
In a 2018 interview with Emma Barnett on BBC Radio 5 Live, Thorp said that she had been so depressed that it had led to a nervous breakdown six years before. She has also said that she had been diagnosed with borderline personality disorder.

As of 2018, Thorp lived on a canal boat, which she would regularly move to different moorings while using her parents' postal address.

Thorp married actor Nikesh Patel in summer 2024, having been in a relationship since 2021 and engaged since 2023. They took part in series five of Celebrity Hunted. Thorp and Patel have a daughter (born late 2023/early 2024).

== Filmography ==
Year	Title	Role	Notes
2013	Doctor Who	Ellie Oswald	Episode - "The Rings of Akhaten" (credited as Nicola Sian)
2013	The Guilty	Miss Bremner	Three part serial
2014	MUNCHIES Guide to the North of England	Herself	Episode 2 - "Northern Rock"
2016	Father Brown	Scarlett Finch	Episode 5 - "The Hand of Lucia"
2016	Doctors	Jessica Nielson	Episode 89 - "The Price of Memory"
2017–2019	Coronation Street	Nicola Rubinstein	Regular role; 97 episodes
2018	Rock With Rudolph	Herself	Music Video
2020–2022	This Morning	Herself	Broadcaster
2022–2023	The Talk	Herself	Broadcaster
2023	Celebrity Hunted	Herself	
2023–2024	Talk Today	Herself	Co-anchor

== Awards and nominations ==
Year	Award	Category	Result	Ref.
2017	Digital Spy Reader Awards	Best Soap Newcomer	Third	
2018	The British Soap Awards	Best Newcomer	Nominated	
