= Sally Carman =

English actress (born 1975)

- Born: 1975; Mexborough, South Yorkshire
- Other name: Sally Carman-Duttine
- Occupation: Actress
- Years active: 1997–present
- Known for: Shameless (2005–2013); Coronation Street (2017–present)
- Spouse: Joe Duttine (m. 2022)

Sally Carman-Duttine is an English actress born in Mexborough, Doncaster, South Yorkshire.

She is known for portraying the roles of Kelly Maguire in the Channel 4 comedy-drama series Shameless (2005–2013), and Abi Franklin in the ITV soap opera Coronation Street (2017–present).

== Career ==
At 18 she attended the LAMDA drama school in London.

Carman made her major television debut in 2000 when she starred as Bridget Salsabill in British drama Bomber, though she had previously featured briefly in an episode of City Central in 1998. As an actress, she has also starred in Doctors, Heartbeat and Holby City. She also played the character of Betty Haigh, the wife of John George Haigh, in the television film A is for Acid.

In 2005 she appeared in what would be a recurring role as Kelly Maguire in Shameless. She became a more prominent character in the 2008 series, and finally a main cast member from 2009 to 2013.

In 2011, she played the character Marie in the film Tyrannosaur, written and directed by Paddy Considine.

On 28 January 2013, Carman appeared in "The Shrine" the first episode of the fourth series of Moving On as Sarah, one of the main characters.

She appeared in the second series of the BBC 1 drama Prisoners' Wives, starting 14 March 2013, as Kim Haines, the wife of a man falsely accused of child abuse.

In September 2014, she played the role of Mrs Casper, the mother of kestrel lover Billy, in Kes, a stage adaptation of Barry Hines’ book, A Kestrel for a Knave, at Cast in Doncaster, South Yorkshire.

Carman was the lead actor in Dreamers a musical play that ran at the Oldham Coliseum in July 2015.

She played DCI Sally Butcher in "River’s Edge" Parts 1 & 2, the final episodes of Silent Witness Series 19, in 2016.

In October 2017, Carman joined the cast of long-running ITV soap opera, Coronation Street. She is playing Abi Franklin, the drug-addicted mother of established teenage character, Seb Franklin (Harry Visinoni).

== Awards and nominations ==
Year	Award	Category	Work	Result	Ref.
2012	17th National Television Awards	Drama Performance: Female	Shameless	Nominated	
2018	TV Choice Awards	Best Soap Newcomer	Coronation Street	Nominated	
2020	Inside Soap Awards	Best Actress	Coronation Street	Nominated	
2021	RTS North West Awards	Best Performance in a Continuing Drama	Coronation Street	Won	
2021	TV Choice Awards	Best Soap Actress	Coronation Street	Won	
2021	26th National Television Awards	Serial Drama Performance	Coronation Street	Shortlisted	
2021	Inside Soap Awards	Best Actress	Coronation Street	Won	
2021	Digital Spy Reader Awards	Best Actor (Female)	Coronation Street	Won	
2022	The British Soap Awards	Best Leading Performer	Coronation Street	Shortlisted	
2022	The British Soap Awards	Best Dramatic Performance	Coronation Street	Nominated	
2022	27th National Television Awards	Serial Drama Performance	Coronation Street	Nominated	
2022	Inside Soap Awards	Best Actress	Coronation Street	Shortlisted	
2022	TV Choice Awards	Best Soap Actress	Coronation Street	Nominated	
2022	RTS North West Awards	Best Performance in a Continuing Drama	Coronation Street	Won	
2022	I Talk Telly Awards	Best Soap Performance	Coronation Street	Nominated	

== Personal life ==
Carman married her co-star Joe Duttine who plays Tim Metcalfe in 2022.

Carman is a Christian; she was baptised at St Philip's Church in Salford in 2019 after finding her faith in 2015.

Carman discovered Reiki while filming Shameless, and subsequently trained at the Oldham Reiki Network. In March 2014 she worked as a therapist at Buddah Beauty, a holistic therapy salon in Chorlton whilst continuing acting.
