= Tim Metcalfe =

Fictional character from Coronation Street

- Coronation Street character
- Portrayed by: Joe Duttine
- Duration: 2013–present
- First appearance: 21 January 2013
- Introduced by: Phil Collinson
- Spin-off appearances: Coronation Street: Text Santa Special (2015)
- Crossover appearances: Corriedale (2026)
In-universe information
- Occupation: Builder; Window cleaner; Taxi firm owner
- Father: Geoff Metcalfe
- Mother: Elaine Jones
- Adoptive mother: Tessa Metcalfe
- Stepmother: Yasmeen Nazir
- Half-brothers: Christopher (adoptive); Craig (adoptive)
- Wife: Charlie Wood (2004–2020); Sally Webster (2015; void, 2020–present) (Note: Tim and Sally initially married in 2015, but it was discovered in 2019 that he was still married to Charlie, thus making his marriage to Sally invalid. Sally and Tim later married in 2020 after his divorce from Charlie.)
- Daughters: Faye Windass
- Adoptive sons: Brody Michaelis (foster)
- Adoptive daughters: Joanie Michaelis (foster); Shanice Michaelis (foster)
- Stepdaughters: Rosie Webster; Sophie Webster
- Granddaughters: Miley Hodge
- First cousins: Richie Parkinson
- Other relatives: Lucy Parkinson

Tim Metcalfe (played by Joe Duttine) is a fictional character from British ITV soap opera Coronation Street introduced on 21 January 2013 as Faye Windass' (Ellie Leach) biological father. Tim's storylines initially focus on his relationship with long-lost daughter Faye Windass (Ellie Leach), Faye's adoptive mother Anna Windass (Debbie Rush) and her partner Owen Armstrong (Ian Puleston-Davies). Tim's storylines later revolve around his rocky relationship with Sally Webster (Sally Dynevor); Sally and Tim's first engagement; the birth of Tim's granddaughter, Miley (Erin, Eilah, and Elsie Halliwell); Tim's worries over Faye's parenting difficulties; the appearance of Tim's first wife Charlie Wood (Siân Reeves) following a long-forgotten wedding in Las Vegas; the ensuing drama between Tim and Sally, prior to their eventual legal marriage in 2020; and Sally's discovery that Tim's dad Geoff (Ian Bartholomew) is a criminal and murderer, leading to Geoff's dramatic arrest and trial.

== Development ==
=== Casting ===
Series producer Phil Collinson said new character Tim Metcalfe would appear in August 2012, stating, "We know Faye's mother is dead, but there's a father out there somewhere, and he's going to come along and challenge things for Anna." On 13 January 2013, it was announced that Joe Duttine had been cast in the role of Tim. Duttine had previously appeared in the soap opera between February and June 2010, as police officer D.S. Carr, who arrests Gail Platt (Helen Worth) for the murder of her husband Joe McIntyre (Reece Dinsdale).

Tom Eames from Digital Spy reported that Anna Windass (Debbie Rush) would be concerned to learn her adoptive daughter Faye makes contact with Tim online. A spokeswoman commented that Anna's feelings would be hurt to learn Faye contacted Tim, and would warn him to stay away.

=== Relationship with Sally Webster ===
Tim begins a relationship with the snobby Sally Webster (Sally Dynevor) in 2013. Describing Sally and Tim's new relationship, Dynevor explained: "He's a bit of a commitment phobe so I'm not sure [what will happen], but he's nice, and Sally really likes him. She's trying to change him – manipulate him into what she wants! But he's not having it and he wants to go off down the pub, and doesn't want to spend any romantic weekends with her or anything. He's a real bloke – he wants his tea on the table!"

In an interview on ITV chat show Loose Women, Duttine explained that despite Tim's unreliable ways, Tim "does really love" Sally. Dynevor later commented, "I didn't want Sally to find someone at first, but I like this relationship, because she's not found 'Mr Perfect'... With Tim, you know there's no way they're going to live happily ever after, they're going to drive each other insane. I like the drama that has to offer." However, Dynevor was proven incorrect, as Tim and Sally's relationship became popular with viewers and went from strength to strength.

In late 2013, show producer Stuart Blackburn teased that Tim and Sally's relationship could be tested by Sally's ex-husband, Kevin Webster's (Michael Le Vell) return the following year: "Kevin loves Sally and seeing her with another man will break his heart. But he’s going to have to accept it." In January 2014, OK! reported Tim would become involved in a love triangle with Sally and Kevin, following Kevin's impending return to the show. As Kevin was set to return in September of that year, producer Blackburn told Digital Spy the show would not be reuniting Kevin and Sally. "Kevin will always regret what he did in the past and there'll always be a 'What if?' when it comes to Sally. His love for Sally won't go away, but... Kevin has figured out now that Tim and Sally are for real. If there is going to be any type of affair, it's more likely to be Tim and Kevin heading off for a pint behind Sally's back!"

In May 2014, Tim decides his relationship with Sally should come to an end, and dumps her. Discussing Tim's reason behind his actions, Duttine commented: "She was getting a bit judgmental about Tim’s opinion of Maddie, and she wasn’t very sympathetic about Maddie’s situation with Ben. Plus, she was being a bit snobby about his window cleaning job. She lost her sense of humour, and I think when Tim tried to lighten the mood, it didn’t go down very well. He just thought she was being too much of a nightmare and bailed out. For Tim, it’s all about having an easy life and not wanting too much conflict or confrontation."

However, they inevitably reunite, and in an interview with Lynn Connolly of Unreality TV, Duttine describes the ironic situation that develops after: "He goes in there to buy Faye a watch, but then Sally jumps to the conclusion that he’s going to propose to her. He then goes to buy a ring with the intention of proposing to Sally because he feels it’s what she wants, not because he wants it. So I guess he does love her, and he’s putting her first and trying to please her." In another reversal, Duttine explains that after Tim proposes, the couple realise neither of them wants to get married after all, revealing that Tim subsequently "un-proposes" to Sally in the Rovers Return Inn. Duttine said he thought this was "sweet" and that Tim and Sally were a "good, fun couple".

In May 2015, Duttine and Dynevor discussed Tim and Sally's relationship with Phillip Schofield and Amanda Holden on ITV daytime programme This Morning, with Dynevor explaining she initially thought Tim and Sally would not go well as a couple: "I was like, 'Tim Metcalfe and Sally Webster – how is that going to work?' but as soon as they put us together and we got the script and starting working together we found things hilariously funny." Duttine commented that Tim is "just pleased to be here and glad somebody will have him" and Dynevor agreed, saying that Sally "feels the same – she's just glad she has a boyfriend!"

=== Live episode (2015) ===
Coronation Street's plans for a live episode in September 2015 to mark the 60th anniversary of ITV were announced 19 November 2014. Producer Stuart Blackburn, said, "We’ve a reputation to uphold after the success of the tram crash, and I’m going to enjoy working with the storyliners and writers as we plot stories for our live episode in 2015. We’ll do all we can to eclipse what’s gone before."

In August 2015, a new storyline saw Sally and Kevin share a small kiss behind Tim's back, then choose not to tell him. Actor Michael Le Vell (Kevin) explained to Sophie Dainty of Digital Spy that Kevin is "in total shock and disbelief" and "genuinely shocked" when Sally kisses him. Despite Kevin and Sally's agreement not to tell Tim, Le Vell believed the kiss would be ultimately revealed: "I don't think it will stay a secret, no. I'm not sure who will tell who but I do know Sophie is quite suspicious - whether anyone else close to Sally or Kevin will be brought into the loop I don't know. But if Tim finds out, he's not going to be happy."

Annie Price of the Daily Express revealed storylines that would be featured in the live episode: the Platt family's feud with Callum Logan (Sean Ward) reaching its climax; the start of Roy Cropper's (David Neilson) relationship with Cathy Matthews (Melanie Hill); and in a comedic revelation, Tim's discovery of Kevin and Sally's kiss. Le Vell later revealed that in the live episode, the secret would be exposed by a drunken character in the pub: "I think someone spills the beans in a drunken stupor, in the live [episode]. I don't know what the consequences are going to be, but there's something very exciting."

On 9 September 2015, Coronation Street announced the one-hour live episode would air on 23 September, in a 19.30 timeslot. The cast gathered on 8 September, for their first read-through of the live episode. On 13 September, Le Vell and Brooke Vincent (Sally's daughter, Sophie) told STV the live episode's storyline involving Sally, Tim and Kevin would "inject a little bit of humour". Vincent said viewers will "have to keep watching" to see if a wedding will commence.

Le Vell commented, about the love triangle: "It’s all linked to Tim and Sally’s wedding... someone lets the cat out the bag – we don’t know who that is – about the kiss, on their wedding day." Duttine, to Daniel Kilkelly of Digital Spy, commented on Tim's discovery of kiss: "I don't really want to see Tim become aggressive or become a player either. I just think that he's a decent bloke who likes his creature comforts and a simple life." Duttine continued, "I think Tim will be heartbroken when he finds out the truth... As for whether Tim will punch Kevin, I don't think Tim's the fighting type."

Duttine and Dynevor later discussed their thoughts on the live broadcast with Katie Fitzpatrick of the Manchester Evening News. Duttine admitted going live is one of "the scariest thing you’ve ever done because you don’t want to be the first one to mess up Coronation Street after years and years." Dynevor worried she would break into uncontrollable laughter, "My fear, working with Joe, is corpsing for me. Once you start laughing you can’t stop."

The live episode aired 23 September, revealing that it is an inebriated Anna that lets on to Tim that Sally kissed Kevin. Despite Sally's best efforts to convince Tim that Anna was lying, Tim is unconvinced, and leaves the pub in shock. Tim packs his bags, staying with Anna and Faye, leaving Sally crying into the arms of Sophie. The live episode was met with positive reviews with many fans tweeting their views on it, and on Duttine's performance.

=== Family ===
In May 2014, Dianne Bourne of the Manchester Evening News, reported the show would be casting a disabled actor in his 40s for the character of Howie, a "cheeky chappy". In September, it was reported that Howie would be Tim's cousin. Producer Stuart Blackburn teased Tim and Howie's relationship: "There [will] be a new character called Howie arriving. He is Tim's cousin and will be providing much more fun for the Websters. In the past, Tim's relationship with Howie has been incredibly fragile. They never see eye to eye, and Howie loves winding up Tim." Despite Blackburn's reporting the show was in final stages of auditioning, with Howie set to appear in early 2015, the character of Howie never appeared.

In March 2018, Ian Bartholomew joined the cast as Tim's father Geoff Metcalfe. Geoff's relationship to Tim was not revealed until transmission 30 March, though viewers of the show had already guessed the twist. In July 2020, following the introduction of Geoff's ex-wife Elaine Jones (Paula Wilcox), fans began guessing Elaine to be Tim's biological mother, despite Geoff telling Tim that his mother, a "Tessa Metcalfe", is dead. Producers later confirmed the fans' theory to be correct.

== Storylines ==
Tim arrives in Weatherfield, after his biological daughter Faye Windass (Ellie Leach) contacts him over the internet. Faye starts sneaking out to see Tim, against her adoptive mother, Anna Windass' (Debbie Rush) wishes. Tim also clashes with Anna's boyfriend Owen Armstrong (Ian Puleston-Davies). However, after Faye's insistence, they allow Faye to visit him. Faye becomes obsessed with her father, which escalates when Tim gets a job and moves into 15a Coronation Street. After Faye's constant pushing, Anna lets her move in with Tim, to Tim's delight.

However, Tim soon realises his has foregone his independence, to become a full-time father. Faye lies to Tim about staying with Anna while he's away at a job in Newcastle. Tim agrees Faye should move back in with Anna. Owen tells Tim to leave Faye alone, and Tim decides Faye would be better off without him. However, when Faye refuses to speak to him, Tim has a change of heart, deciding to stay in Weatherfield for good.

Tim begins a relationship with Sally Webster (Sally Dynevor), but hides from Sally in his flat above the Corner Shop, when she plans a romantic weekend break to Paris. After a chat with his boss Jason Grimshaw (Ryan Thomas), Tim puts his concerns aside, committing to a relationship with Sally.

Sally leaves Faye and her friend Grace Piper (Ella-Grace Gregoire) on their own, which angers Tim. Grace manipulates the situation to cause trouble. Tim is concerned when Faye is questioned by the police for bullying Simon Barlow (Alex Bain). Tim eventually confesses to Sally that he blames himself for being a bad father.

In January 2014, Tim turns over a new leaf, leaving the building trade to set up his own window cleaning business. He moves in with Sally, and her daughter Sophie (Brooke Vincent). Maddie Heath (Amy James-Kelly) breaks into the house while Tim is at home, and when he tries to stop her, Maddie punches him. Embarrassed, Tim lies to police, telling them a man broke in, and that he confronted the burglar. Maddie confesses her crime to Sophie, telling her Tim knows it was her. Sophie asks her not to tell Sally. Weeks later, Maddie accidentally lets slip to Sally what really happened.

In May 2014, Tim and Sally feel their relationship is not working. Tim decides to move out, making arrangements with Dev Alahan (Jimmi Harkishin), so that he can continue to see Faye. The couple then realise they were wrong to split, after a single argument, and recommit. Sally is delighted when Tim proposes, but the couple agrees they're not ready for marriage. Sally's ex-husband, Kevin Webster (Michael Le Vell) returns from Frankfurt, which motivates Tim to buy his share of the house, so Sally and he can share a future.

In April 2015, Tim is shocked when Faye gives birth to a baby girl she names Miley (Erin, Eilah and Elsie Halliwell), but loves the idea of having a grandchild. He sees it as a second chance to be a father figure. However Faye does not want to be a mother. Tim, Anna and Owen question Faye about the baby's paternity. Owen attacks Faye's teenage friend, Craig Tinker (Colson Smith), thinking that he is the father, and leaves. Anna becomes Miley's primary carer while trying to persuade Faye to take an active role in Miley's life.

Tim is pleased when Miley's father, Jackson begins taking responsibility, but upset to realise Miley will spend less time with Faye. Tim suggests Faye and Jackson Hodge (Rhys Cadman) register her birth, and christen Miley. At Miley's christening, Faye breaks down, admitting to Tim she's not ready to be a mother. Faye is clearly unable to cope, so Jackson's wealthy parents, Greig and Josie, suggest Miley live with them, leaving Tim devastated.

Tim comes round to the idea, and despite Anna's reservations, Miley goes to live with Jackson and his family. The Windlasses say a tearful goodbye. Weeks later, it seems Anna and Faye will never see Miley again, as the Hodges have emigrated to Canada. Tim and Anna discuss this with Faye, Tim promising to get Miley back. Faye ultimately decides Miley will have a better life in Canada.

In July 2015, Tim goes to Underworld and publicly asks Sally to "not marry him". Tim ironically becomes a close friend to Sally's ex-husband Kevin, enough to irritate him. On Kevin's birthday, Tim buys Kevin a friendship bracelet. Kevin secretly dislikes it. On the same day, with Sally now engaged to Tim, Sally kisses Kevin. The two decide to keep it secret. Sally and Tim get engaged, but Anna drunkenly tells Tim about the kiss, in front of everyone in the Rovers.

A furious Tim ends his engagement to Sally, leaving her devastated. Sally, depressed, stands firm that the wedding will take place, despite Tim's refusal to even acknowledge her. Kevin and Anna try to convince Tim to reconcile with Sally. Kevin finally getting through to him.

Sally stands at the altar with Sophie, Faye and Rita Tanner (Barbara Knox) and refuses to leave until Tim joins her. Tim eventually does arrives, and they marry. Tim and Sally go on their honeymoon, and it is clear they are happy together.

In December 2015, Tim is overwhelmed with guilt when he accidentally runs over Sarah Platt (Tina O'Brien) in his new van, though Sally and other residents of Coronation Street attempt to convince Tim it was not his fault.

Later, Sally buys Lloyd Mullaney's (Craig Charles) share of the StreetCars taxi firm for Tim. Tim works alongside co-owner Steve McDonald (Simon Gregson), sparking a new friendship. Sally is elected local councillor for Weatherfield but her snobbish behaviour puts a strain on her marriage, so Tim starts brewing his own beer, which becomes successful with the residents. When Steve discovers that Will Chatterton (Leon Ockenden) kissed his wife Michelle Connor (Kym Marsh), Tim fights with Will, on Steve's behalf, as Steve's arm is in a sling.

In March 2018, Tim becomes instrumental in exposing crimes perpetuated by Anna's rapist, and Eileen's husband, Pat Phelan (Connor McIntyre). Tim entraps Phelan into admitting to his role in the "Calcutta Street" scam. He is unable to get Phelan to confess to framing Anna for pushing their daughter's boyfriend – Seb Franklin (Harry Visinoni) – off a ladder, or for killing both Michael Rodwell (Les Dennis) and Luke Britton (Dean Fagan).

The whole truth about Phelan is revealed when Gary and Seb search for the gun Phelan used to kill Luke, and end up unearthing the bodies of Phelan's two other murdered victims: Michael's surrogate son Andy Carver (Oliver Farnworth) and Phelan's ex-business partner Vinny Ashford (Ian Kelsey). When Tim learns of this from Gary, he alerts Eileen about Phelan's crimes. Tim and Eileen's best friend Liz McDonald (Beverley Callard) race over to the cottage where Gary and Seb are staying. They are relieved to find Eileen safe and that Phelan is presumed dead. The following day, as police descend on Weatherfield, Tim informs the street of Phelan's crimes.

In December 2019, Tim discovers he is already married to a woman called Charlie Wood (Siân Reeves) following a wedding in Las Vegas in 2004, making him a bigamist, and his marriage to Sally invalid. After ample persuasion, Charlie signs divorce papers so Tim can legally marry Sally. Sally tries to keep Tim's bigamy a secret from the street, but is furious to find that everyone knew. Sally almost splits with Tim over the scandal, but by mid 2020 they reconcile, and marry for the second time, in October 2020.

In April 2020, Geoff is attacked by Yasmeen, after months of Geoff's psychological abuse and coercive control. Tim and Sally, not knowing Geoff's true nature, or what he had been putting Yasmeen, have been indoctrinated by Geoff, against the truth. Sally grows doubtful of Geoff's version of events, after Geoff is released from hospital and his visits to sex workers come to light. After discussing it with Alya, Sally decides to kick Geoff out of No. 6, and agrees to be a witness for Yasmeen.

Tim remains doubtful and sticks by his father, even when in July that year, a woman called Elaine Jones arrives in Weatherfield and is revealed to be Geoff's first wife Philippa Metcalfe (Geoff had said his first wife died of cancer, in Spain, in the 1970s). Sally and Alya try to tell Tim who Elaine really is, but Tim doesn't believe it.

In September 2020, Sally gets hold of Geoff's laptop, trying to get hard evidence of Yasmeen's ordeal, and also to prove to Tim that Alya and Elaine are telling the truth. After watching the video Sally finds, Tim sees the light. He confronts his dad, and disowns him. Tim apologises to Alya, and tries to contact Elaine to make amends. He discovers Elaine is missing after visiting her address and finding stacks of unopened mail.

In December that year Elaine turns up, agreeing to testify at Yasmeen's upcoming trial, despite Geoff's threats. Elaine provides testimony, there is CCTV footage of Geoff at the hospital on the day he made threats, and phone footage of Geoff threatening Yasmeen, and the jury rules in Yasmeen's favour.

Geoff dies in December 2020 after falling off the roof of No.6 while trying to kill Yasmeen. After Geoff's death, Tim and Elaine can bond as mother and son, and all are able to finally move on with their lives.

In April 2021, Tim is devastated when Faye is sent down for 3 years for attacking Adam Barlow, in a case of mistaken identity. Faye had been attacked by Ray Crosby a few months before, and Faye is eventually released in November that year, after Ray admits to assaulting her.

In 2022, Tim finds out he has a heart condition and needs a serious operation. He doesn’t tell Sally, instead confiding in Aggie Bailey (Lorna Laidlaw). Sally finds out, only moments before the operation.

== Reception ==
James Brinsford of the Metro praised Coronation Street for highlighting the issue of illiteracy, through the character of Tim Metcalf, stating that less than one per cent of adults are completely illiterate. The review states "Bravo Corrie!", for showing that illiteracy persists. Radio Times' David Brown praised the pairing of Tim and Sally, commenting: "Tim and Sally have been comedy gold since they got together". Dan Martin of The Guardian also praised Sally and Tim's relationship, calling it "the best story in Corrie of recent months." Martin commented, "If they can play the serious emotional stuff as well as they have done the comedy, they’ll surely seal their place in the Corrie Couples Hall of Fame".

Duttine and Dynevor won Best On-Screen Partnership at the 2015 British Soap Awards for their portrayal of Tim and Sally. The pair were nominated for the same award at the Inside Soap Awards that year, with Duttine also nominated for Funniest Male, eventually winning the award. Duttine and Dynevor did not win Inside Soap's Best On-Screen Partnership, with Emmerdale's Charlie Hardwick and Chris Chittell (Val and Eric Pollard) taking home the award.
