= Weatherfield =

Fictional town in Manchester from Coronation Street

- Coronation Street location
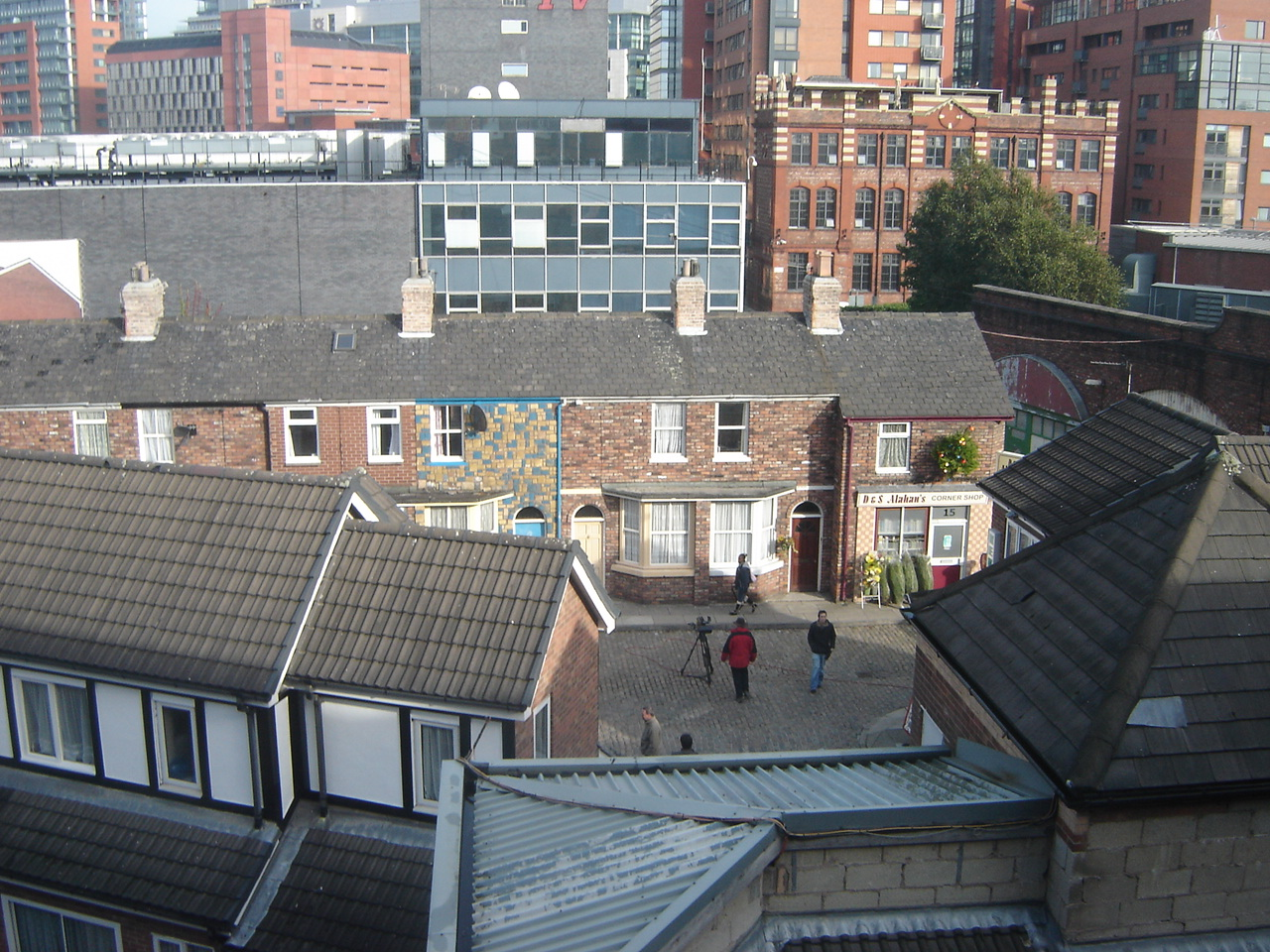
- Part of the Coronation Street set in 2007
- Created by: Tony Warren
- Genre: Soap opera

In-universe information
- Type: Town
- Location: Greater Manchester
- Locations: Coronation Street; Rovers Return Inn
- Characters: Coronation Street characters

Weatherfield is a fictional town based on Salford, Greater Manchester, which has been the setting for the British ITV soap opera Coronation Street since its inception in 1960. Much of Weatherfield has been seen by viewers throughout the years, though the primary focus from the viewer's perspective is the eponymous Coronation Street, a cobbled street (Note: Although often referred to as "cobbled" or "the cobbles", the paving of Coronation Street is done in setts, not cobbles.) where many of the programme's characters live. The soap opera is often shot on location around Salford and the neighbouring large city of Manchester, as its filming studios, the Granada Studios complex on Quay Street in Manchester city centre (which closed in 2013) and its replacement set MediaCityUK in Salford Quays (opened in 2014), only house the outdoor sets of Coronation Street and its immediate surrounding streets.

As part of the 2010 Children in Need charity appeal, Weatherfield became twinned with Walford in a special programme uniting the two soaps, Coronation Street and EastEnders, called East Street.

== Education ==
=== Bessie Street Primary School ===
Formerly "Bessie Street Mixed Infants" and "Bessie Street Juniors", "Bessie Street Primary School" is the main institution for primary education in Weatherfield.

Headteachers:

- Wilfred Perkins (1972–1974)
- Mrs Nandhra (2010)
- Miss Muirhouse (2014)
- Brian Packham (2011–2013)
- Mrs Glover (2014)
- Melinda Calvert (2018–)

Many of the characters in the programme attended Bessie Street as children – before and after the programme was created and began broadcasting. These include Albert Tatlock (Jack Howarth), Ken Barlow (William Roache), Dennis Tanner (Philip Lowrie), Tracy Barlow (Kate Ford), Nick Tilsley (Ben Price), Sarah-Louise Platt (Tina O'Brien), David Platt (Jack P. Shepherd), Chesney Brown (Sam Aston), Bethany Platt (Lucy Fallon), Joshua Peacock (Benjamin Beresford), Amy Barlow (Elle Mulvaney), Simon Barlow (Alex Bain), Asha Alahan (Tanisha Gorey), Aadi Alahan (Zennon Ditchett) and Max Turner (Harry McDermott).

Some characters have also worked there, notably Ken who took his first teaching job at Bessie Street in 1961, the year after the series began. He worked there intermittently until 1974. Esther Hayes (Daphne Oxenford), who lived at No. 5 Coronation Street until 1962, also worked as a teacher at the school. The role of lollipop man at Bessie Street has been held by Albert, Percy Sugden (Bill Waddington), Jack Duckworth (Bill Tarmey) and most recently Dennis and Malcolm Lagg (Robert Fyfe). The headteacher was Brian Packham (Peter Gunn), but he has been replaced. Melinda Calvert (Janet Dibley) is currently the headteacher of Bessie Street.

Peter Barlow (Chris Gascoyne) goes to see his son, Simon, perform in the nativity play in December 2008; however, he is refused entry for being drunk. He fights his way through and ruins the play. In 2013, Kylie Platt (Paula Lane) arrives drunk at her son Max's nativity play and the Platt family is removed immediately when Kylie tries to drag Max off the stage. In June 2014, Kylie and her husband, David, are called in as Max has been disruptive during lessons. This later leads to him being diagnosed with ADHD.

Coronation Street residents currently attending the school are Jack Webster (Kyran Bowes), Ruby Dobbs (Macy Alabi), Jake Windass (Bobby Bradshaw), Lily Platt (Brooke Malonie), and Joseph Brown (William Flanagan).

=== Weatherfield High School ===
Headteachers:

- Sue Jeffers (1990–1997)
- Mrs Paton (2000)
- Miss Johnson (2002)
- Mrs Crawshaw (2021–present)

Formerly "Weatherfield Comprehensive School", "Weatherfield High School" is the main institution for secondary education in Weatherfield. The school provides education for pupils aged 11–18.

Lucille Hewitt (Jennifer Moss) is the first character to sit her O-level examinations at the newly formed Weatherfield Comprehensive in 1965 after the amalgamation of the Weatherfield School for Girls and the Weatherfield Boys' School.

The school rarely features until Ken Barlow returns to teaching in 1991, taking a post in the English department. By this time, a teenage Tracy Barlow is a pupil at the school, along with Steve (Simon Gregson) and Andy McDonald (Nicholas Cochrane). Nick Tilsley (played by Warren Jackson and later Adam Rickitt) attends from 1992 to 1997. Derek Wilton (Peter Baldwin) works as a caretaker at the school for a short time in the early 1990s. The school is referred to as 'Weatherfield Comp' in many scripts but since 2004, the school has been known as 'Weatherfield High'.

Other former pupils include Jenny Bradley (Sally Ann Matthews) (during the 1980s), Toyah Battersby (Georgia Taylor) (towards the end of the 1990s), Sarah-Louise Platt (Tina O'Brien) (who attended from 1998 to 2003), Candice Stowe (Nikki Sanderson), Todd Grimshaw (Bruno Langley) and Aiden Critchley (Dean Ashton) who attended around the same time. Since the year 2000, pupils to have attended the school include Rosie Webster (Helen Flanagan), David Platt (Jack P. Shepherd), Amber Kalirai (Nikki Patel) and Craig Harris (Richard Fleeshman). In 2004, Violet Wilson (Jenny Platt) is identified as a former pupil of Ken Barlow (William Roache) and sometimes still refers to him as "sir". Sophie Webster (Brooke Vincent), Chesney Brown (Sam Aston), Sian Powers (Sacha Parkinson), Ryan Connor (Ben Thompson) and Ben Richardson (Lucien Laviscount) all leave the school after taking their exams in Year 11. Recent graduates of the school include Craig Tinker (Colson Smith), Bethany Platt (Lucy Fallon), Faye Windass (Ellie Leach) and Simon Barlow (Alex Bain).

The characters in Coronation Street currently attending the school now are Amy Barlow (Elle Mulvaney), Max Turner (Harry McDermott, Paddy Bever) and Summer Spellman (Harriet Bibby).

Scenes at Weatherfield High School are filmed on location at Oasis Academy MediaCityUK in Salford.

=== Oakhill School ===
Weatherfield's only private school is in the Oakhill area of the town.

The school first appears in the programme in 1993, when Mike Baldwin (Johnny Briggs) offers to pay for his estranged son Mark Redman (Christopher Cook) to be educated there. In 2004, Oakhill reappears when Rosie Webster (Helen Flanagan) is accepted at the school, where she studies for her GCSEs. In 2020, Asha (Tanisha Gorey) and Aadi Alahan (Adam Hussain) transferred to Oakhill after Dev Alahan (Jimmi Harkishin) moved them from Weatherfield High, hoping it would solve the problem of Asha's explicit video going viral.

Scenes at Oakhill School are filmed on location at Cheadle Hulme School.

=== Weatherfield Polytechnic/University ===
Jenny Bradley (Sally Ann Matthews) briefly attends here, along with her friend and housemate Flick Khan. Jenny studies biology until she is expelled for neglecting her work. It is later attended by Andy McDonald (Nicholas Cochrane), by which time it has been reclassified as a university under the Further and Higher Education Act 1992. Andy is successful in his studies, graduating with a lower second class honours degree.

== Local press ==
Weatherfield has its own local newspaper, The Weatherfield Gazette. A free local newspaper existed in the programme until 1990, known as The Weatherfield Recorder. Weatherfield also has a tabloid newspaper called The Daily Pulse.

== Local shops and businesses ==
=== D&S Alahan's Corner Shop ===
D&S Alahan's Corner Shop
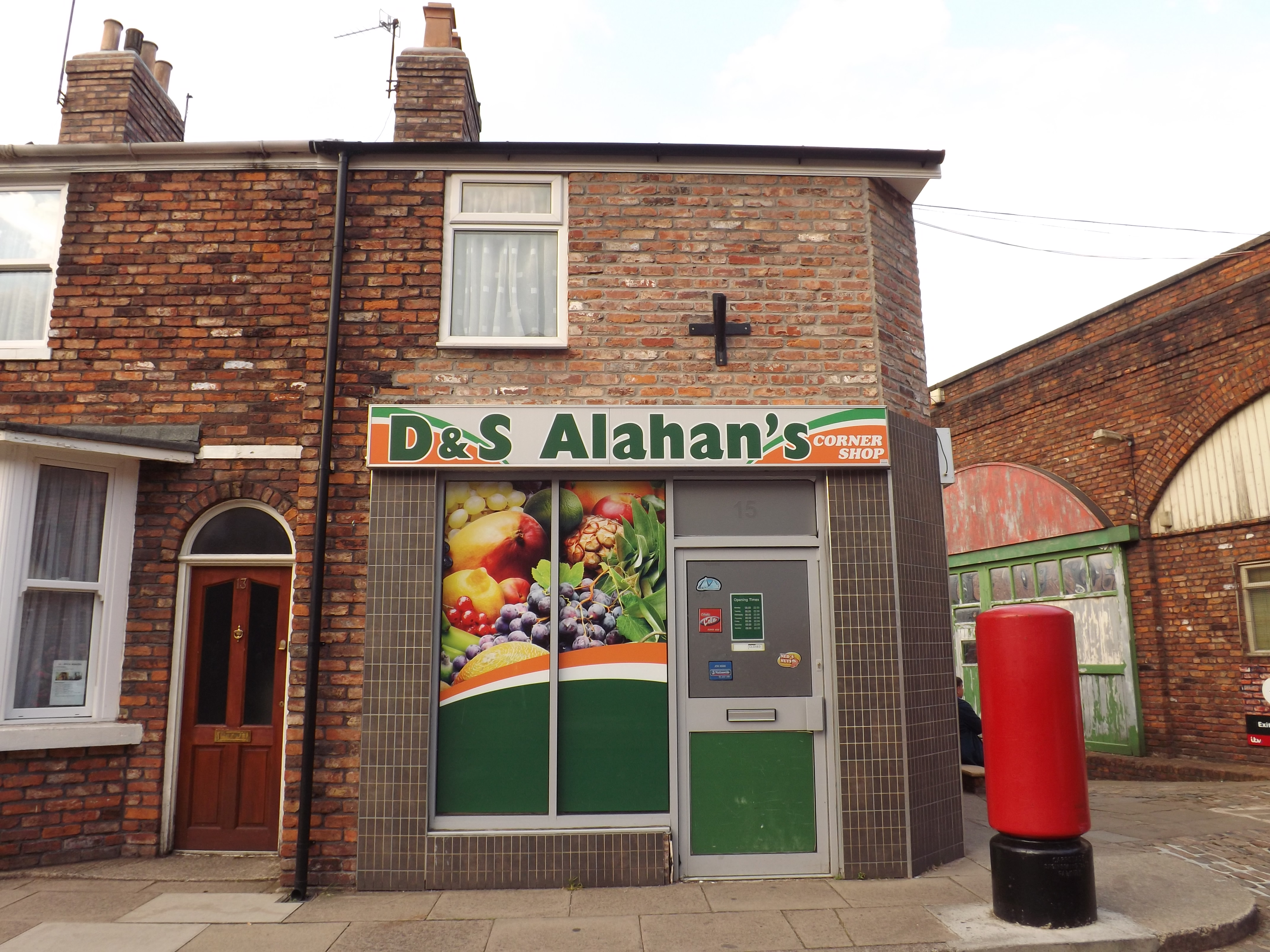
- Original D&S Alahan's Corner Shop at Coronation Street: The Tour at the former Granada Studios, Quay Street, Manchester

In-universe information
- Type: General Convenience Store
- Founded: 2004 (as D&S Alahan's)
- Address: 15 Coronation Street
- Owner: Dev Alahan
- Key people: Aadi Alahan: Trainee Manager/Assistant; Evelyn Plummer: Assistant; Asha Alahan: Assistant; Amy Barlow: Assistant

D&S Alahan's Corner Shop is situated at 15 Coronation Street and is on the junction to Viaduct Street. It was owned by Dev Alahan (Jimmi Harkishin) and Sunita Alahan (Shobna Gulati), until the death of Sunita in The Rovers Return fire in 2013; now it is solely owned by Dev. D&S Alahan's was hit by a tram in December 2010, while Sunita, Molly Dobbs (Vicky Binns) and her baby Jack were inside. Jack and Sunita were subsequently saved but Molly died. The shop was closed for the beginning of 2011 but re-opened in late February. Until December 2010, the corner shop was the only business that had stood since the very first episode. Another notable storyline for D&S Alahan's involved Maya Sharma (Sasha Behar) setting fire to the shop in 2004, leading to an explosion while Dev and Sunita were in the flat above.

=== The Kabin ===
The Kabin
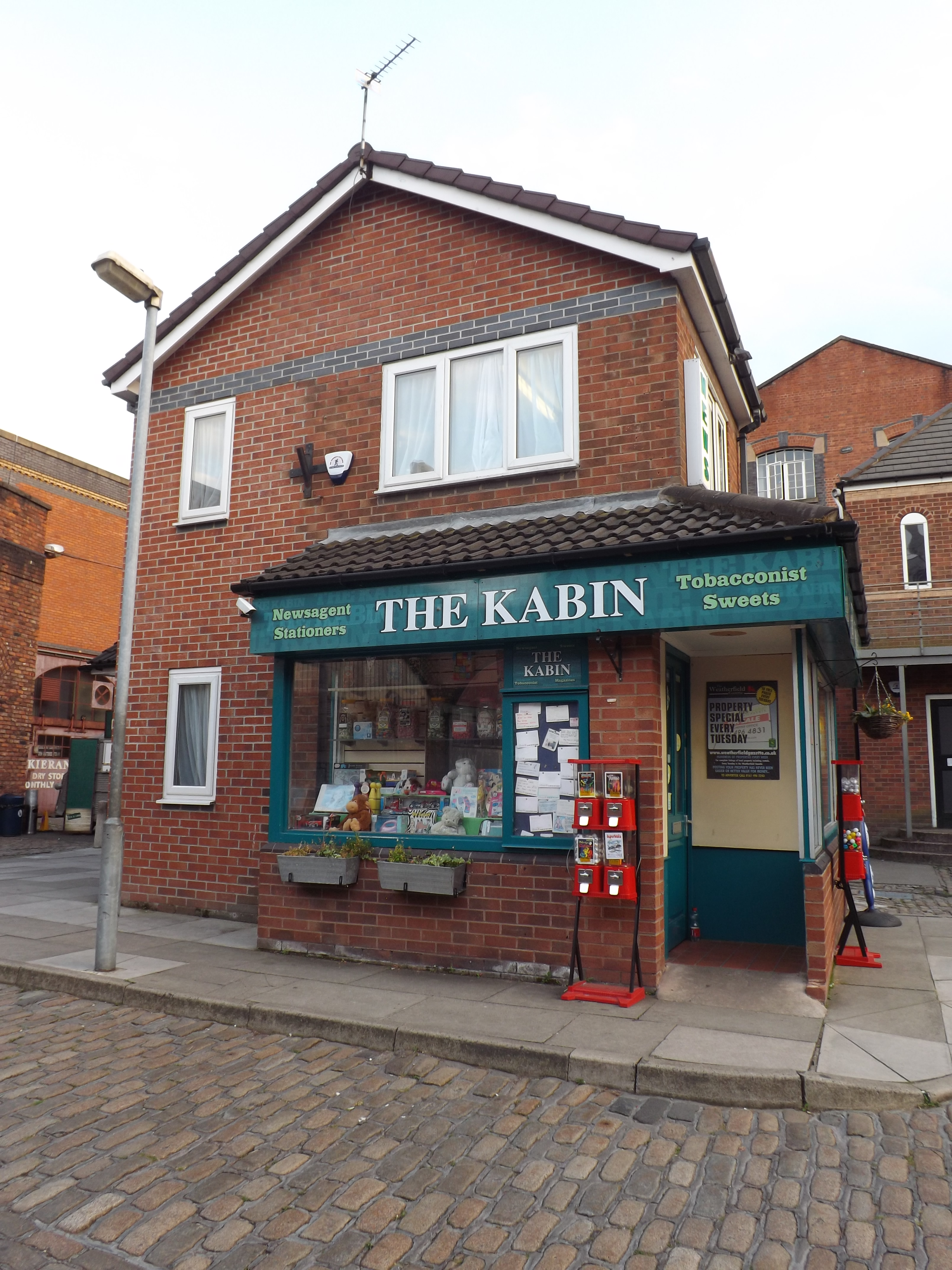
- Original Kabin at Coronation Street: The Tour at the former Granada Studios, Quay Street, Manchester

In-universe information
- Type: Newsagent (Former Post Office)
- Founded: 1990 (in current location)
- Address: 10 Coronation Street
- Owner: Brian Packham (50%); Cathy Matthews (50%)
- Key people: Rita Tanner: Newsagent

The Kabin is also at the junction of Coronation Street and Viaduct Street. The Kabin mainly sells newspapers, magazines, traditional sweets and seasonal goods (Christmas, Easter, Halloween). Originally opened by Rita Sullivan (Barbara Knox) as the Korner Kabin on Rosamund Street, it moved to its current location in 1990. In late 2009, Rita sells The Kabin to employee Norris Cole (Malcolm Hebden) so that she can go travelling. When she returns, she is re-employed by Norris. The Kabin, along with D&S Alahan's Corner Shop and The Joinery wine bar, is involved in the tram crash in December 2010. The tram rips through the shop and the flats above, with Rita inside the shop. After initially believing that Rita is out at a friend's, Norris and Emily Bishop (Eileen Derbyshire) raise the alarm and Rita is eventually rescued. In 2019, Norris announces to Rita that he is selling The Kabin and later sells it to Brian Packham (Peter Gunn) and Cathy Matthews (Melanie Hill). Rita then finds out and tells Brian she is quitting as she does not want to work for them. Brian and Cathy apologise to Rita and offer her the job of manageress. Since 2022, the business is rarely seen on screen.

=== Audrey's Salon ===
Audrey's Salon
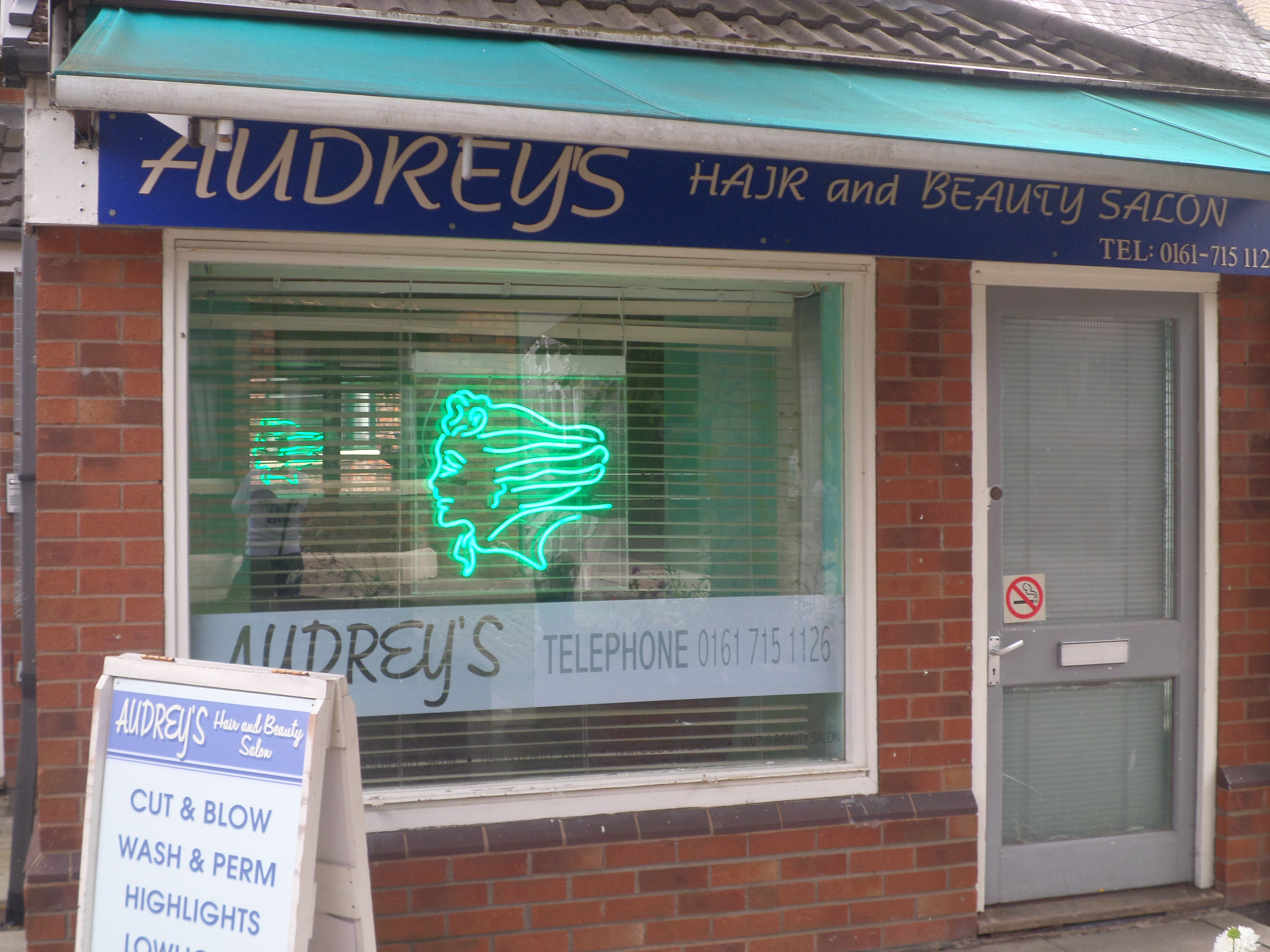
- Audrey's Salon logo

In-universe information
- Type: Hairdressing and Beauty Salon
- Founded: 1991 (as Audrey's)
- Address: 2 Coronation Street
- Owner: Debbie Webster
- Key people: Audrey Roberts: Manager; David Platt: Hairdresser; Maria Connor: Hairdresser

Audrey's Salon is a salon situated at the junction of Rosamund Street and Coronation Street. It was owned by Claudia Colby (Rula Lenska), Maria Connor (Samia Longchambon) and Rita Tanner (Barbara Knox). 2 Coronation Street had been a hairdresser's salon since 1991, shortly after it was built. It was originally a charity shop run by Emily Bishop (Eileen Derbyshire) in 1990. Previous salon owners include Denise Osbourne (Denise Black) and Audrey Roberts (Sue Nicholls). The salon was closed in 2020 after Ray Crosby bought the shop and upstairs flat while trying to redevelop the street, but it re-opened again in 2022, as a focus for Audrey who had recently tried to kill herself.

=== Underworld ===
Underworld
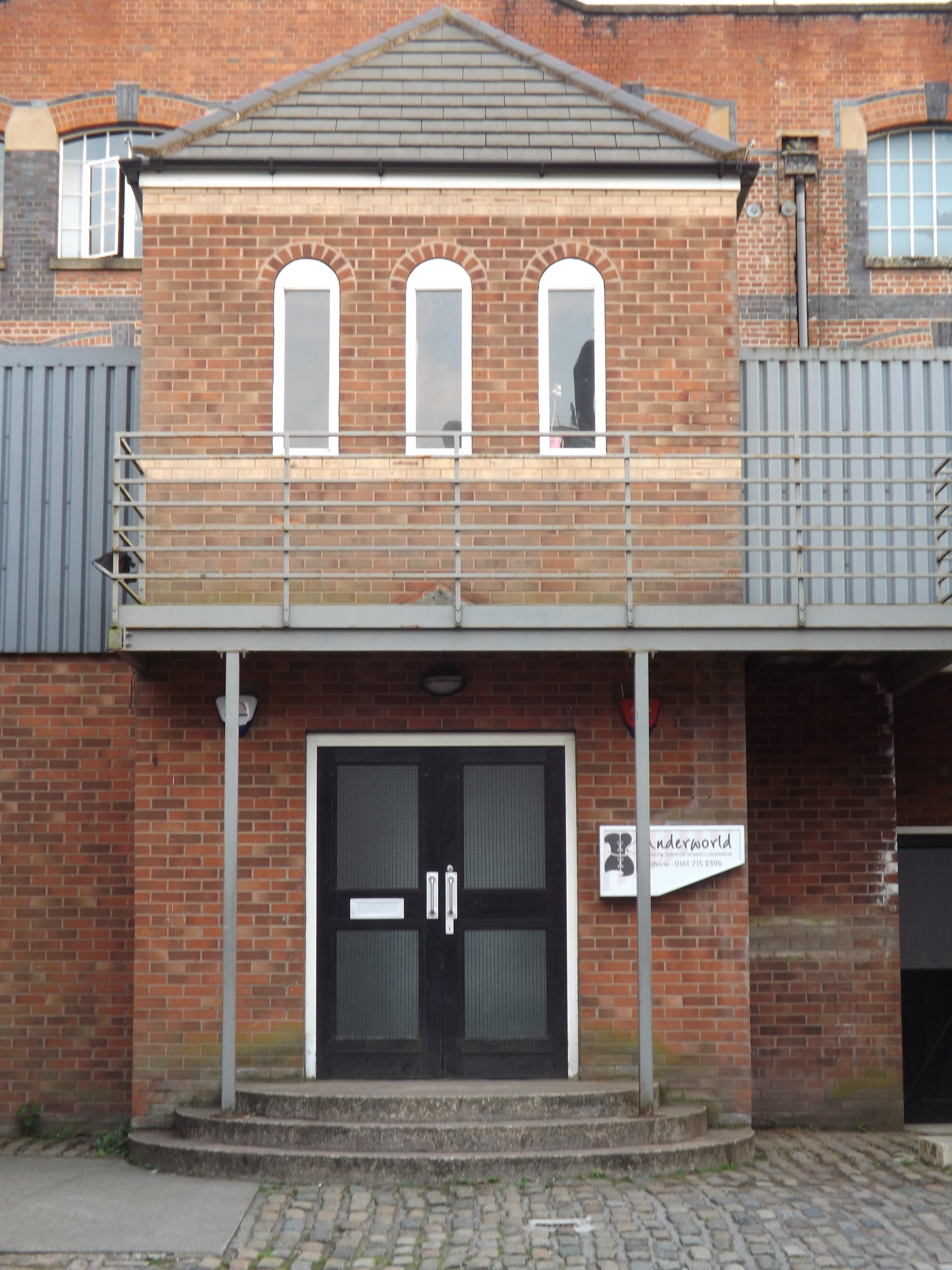
- Original Underworld at Coronation Street: The Tour at the former Granada Studios, Quay Street, Manchester

In-universe information
- Type: Clothing factory
- Founder: Mike Baldwin
- Founded: 1998 (as Underworld)
- Address: Unit 14, Coronation Street
- Owner: Carla Connor
- Key people: Carla Connor: Manager; Sarah Platt: Assistant Manager; Michael Bailey: Junior Manager; Sally Metcalfe: Machinery Supervisor; Kirk Sutherland: Packing Supervisor/Deliveryman/Salesman; Izzy Armstrong: Machinist; Fiz Dobbs: Machinist; Sean Tully: Machinist; Betsy Swain: Machinist

Underworld is the underwear factory situated on Coronation Street, which has employed many residents of Weatherfield. The company was founded by Mike Baldwin (Johnny Briggs) as Baldwins Casuals but was later owned by Carla Connor (Alison King). After Mike died, his son's Danny Baldwin (Bradley Walsh) and Adam Barlow (Sam Robertson) sell their shares to Paul (Sean Gallagher) and Liam Connor (Rob James-Collier). After Paul's death, his wife, Carla, inherits his 60% share in the factory. Carla's new husband Tony Gordon (Gray O'Brien) purchases Liam's shares shortly before he dies but, after Tony is imprisoned for Liam's murder, Carla buys his shares. Nick Tilsley (Ben Price) purchases them in early 2010, then sells his 40% share back to Carla when the pair do not get along. In 2011, Frank Foster (Andrew Lancel) buys Nick's former share from Carla.

In early June 2010, Tony takes revenge on Carla and Roy Cropper (David Neilson) by taking Carla and Roy's wife Hayley (Julie Hesmondhalgh) hostage, before setting the factory on fire with Carla inside (see "Siege Week"). She manages to escape but Tony walks back into the blazing factory and dies. During the re-construction of the factory John Stape (Graeme Hawley) and Charlotte Hoyle (Becky Hindley) hide the body of Colin Fishwick (David Crellin), who died inside No. 5 Coronation Street following an argument with the pair, under the floor of the factory. John had stolen Colin's identity to allow him to teach again. However, unbeknownst to John, Owen Armstrong Construction is about to cement over the hole and, before John could do anything, the floor is covered with Colin underneath. The body remains undetected until July 2011, when drain problems with the factory toilets lead to the floor being dug up. John, terrified that his secret is about to be uncovered, manages to get himself on the labour team and goes to the factory late one night to find Colin's body; John's wife Fiz Stape (Jennie McAlpine) interrupts him and discovers the body. Eventually, the police find out about John's cover up and investigate, but John makes a get away, leaving Fiz facing the blame for his crimes.

Frank takes up a partnership with Carla, their relationship grows, and they become engaged. As the wedding plans progress Carla realises that she still has feelings for Peter, and she calls off the wedding. Frank rapes Carla at her flat, and she later reports this to the police. Frank is arrested but later released on bail on condition that he stay away from Carla and the business. Frank's mother steps into his shoes at the factory and interferes with Carla's life, making it harder for her to run the factory. Frank steals the clients from Underworld and sends in men to take his share of items and stock from the business to set up his new business elsewhere in the area. With no work for the staff, Carla makes the decision to lay off staff. First is by mutual agreement with Becky McDonald (Katherine Kelly), who walks out as she was the last to be employed at the factory. She is followed by Eileen Grimshaw (Sue Cleaver) for the same reason. Carla also dismisses Sally Webster (Sally Dynevor), who is upset that Carla has done so, as Sally has worked for the factory and been loyal to the business for many years. Frank approaches Sally and offers her a supervisor's job at his new factory which she accepts. Frank later returns to Underworld merging his business with Carla's, bringing his staff with him.

In April 2012, after Frank is found dead in the factory, his 40% share is to be purchased by Sally. After meeting with Frank's lawyers, Carla discovers that Frank has left his share of the factory to her, having forgotten to change his will after the rape, much to the happiness of her sister-in-law, Michelle Connor (Kym Marsh). In December 2013, Carla gives 50% of the business to her husband Peter Barlow (Chris Gascoyne) after he loses the bookies but demands the shares back after uncovering his affair with Tina McIntyre (Michelle Keegan). In January 2014, the factory loses one of its much-loved staff members, as Hayley passes away from pancreatic cancer.

In 2015, Carla has a breakdown, believing that she is responsible for the fire at Victoria Court. This causes her to lose focus at work, and she cancels meetings with clients and misses deadlines. She also starts gambling with the factory's money and drinking heavily. Concerned, Nick and Michelle call upon Aidan Connor (Shayne Ward) to help out. Aidan agrees to invest £100,000 in the factory in exchange for a 40% share. However, Carla continues to gamble, irritating Aidan. It soon emerges that Aidan borrowed money from his father, Johnny Connor (Richard Hawley) to buy the factory shares. Johnny insists that he now has a say in how the factory is run and settles with 22% of the shares; Aidan retained the remaining 18%. Carla later discovers that Tracy Barlow (Kate Ford) is to blame for the fire and begins to get her life back on track. After breaking up with her fiancé Nick, Carla decides to move away to Devon. She eventually sells her 60% share of the factory to Johnny along with her flat. Adam returns to the street in 2016 and forms a plan to reclaim his former share of the factory from the Connors. He enlists the help of Alya to gain access to the factory to find financial evidence to prove that he is one of the legal owners of Underworld. However, his plan falls through as Alya tips the Connors off and they threaten to report him to the police unless he drops the case against them. Adam agrees as he knows that being reported to the police could compromise his legal career. In September 2017, the factory loses all of its business and everything inside.

In March 2019, Gary Windass (Mikey North) sabotages the already fragile factory roof to get more building work. However, this causes the roof to collapse and injure the machinists, including Sally, Kirk Sutherland (Andrew Whyment), Sean Tully (Antony Cotton), Paul Foreman (Peter Ash), Gemma Winter (Dolly-Rose Campbell) and Emma Brooker (Alexandra Mardell). Rana Habeeb (Bhavna Limbachia) is also trapped in the wreckage, and later dies from her injuries on the day she is supposed to be marrying her fiancée, Kate Connor (Faye Brookes).

=== Viaduct Bistro ===
Viaduct Bistro
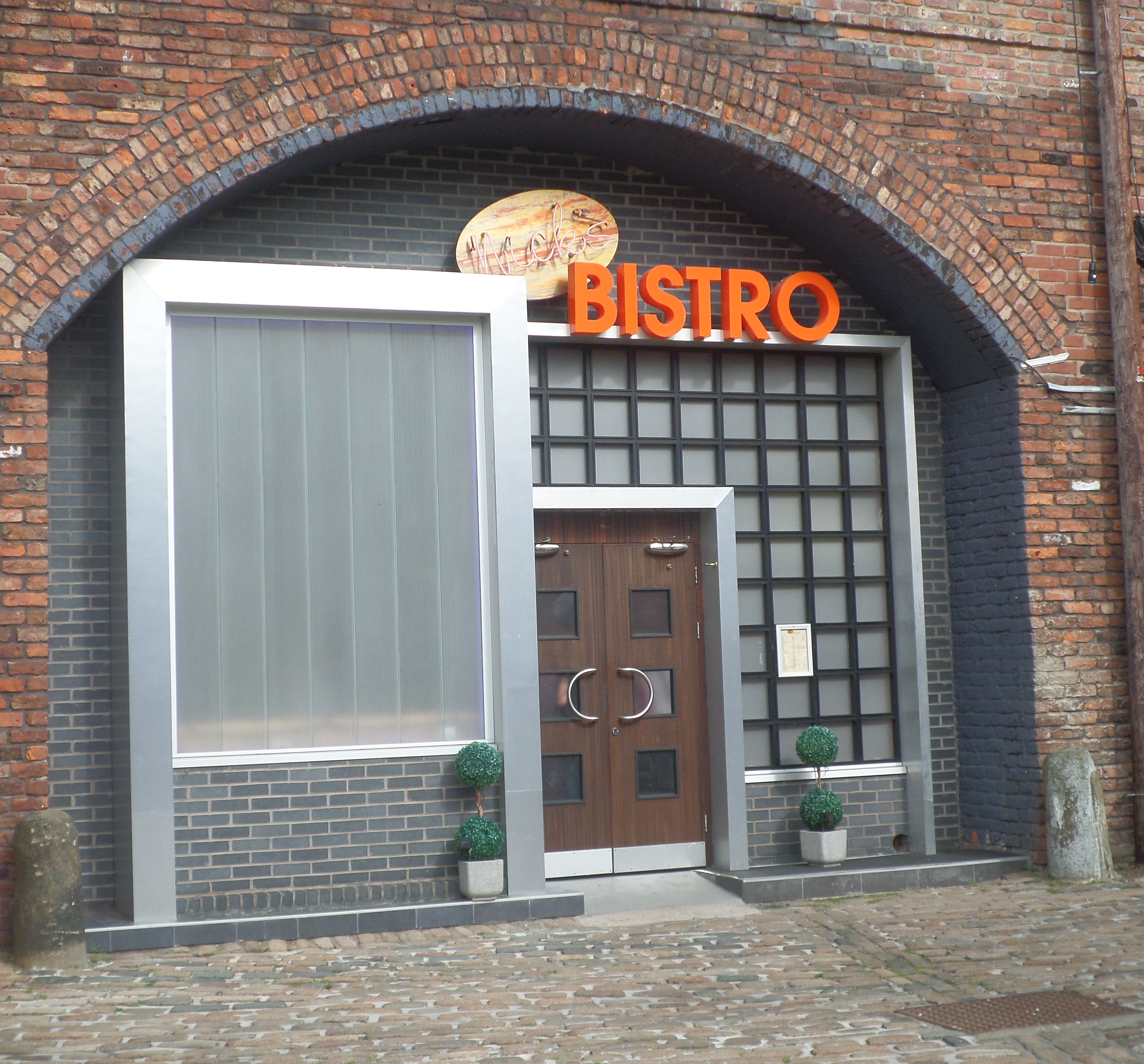
- Exterior

In-universe information
- Type: Restaurant/Bar
- Founded: 2010 (as The Joinery: Wine Bar)
- Address: Viaduct Street
- Owners: Leanne Battersby; Nick Tilsley
- Key people: Toyah Habeeb: Waiting staff; Amy Barlow: Waiting staff

Viaduct Bistro is situated on Viaduct Street under the viaduct. It was formerly a joiners' workshop before it was renovated and became The Joinery Wine Bar in 2010. The Joinery was first opened in early 2010 by Peter Barlow (Chris Gascoyne) and Leanne Barlow (Jane Danson), but was owned by George Wilson (Anthony Valentine). On its first night Peter's alcoholism gets the better of him when he becomes drunk and violent, leaving Leanne devastated, so its first night is also its last.

In mid-2010 after the siege which saw the factory burn down, Nick Tilsley (Ben Price) sees an opportunity to use it as temporary factory, but he does so under the name Nick's Knicks meaning it had nothing to do with Carla Connor (Alison King) or Underworld. After the closure of the temporary factory, Nick rents the space again from owner George and re-opens The Joinery in late 2010, employing ex-kebab shop worker Cheryl Gray (Holly Quin-Ankrah) as barmaid and Ciaran McCarthy (Keith Duffy) as chef, with ex-wife Leanne as manager to allow her to live her dream. However, Nick and Leanne grow close and embark on an affair. In December Ken Barlow (William Roache) walks in on them in the office looking for Peter and is disgusted with Leanne. The Joinery is destroyed following a gas explosion causing the tram to crash onto Coronation Street in front of the bar, which kills Ashley Peacock (Steven Arnold) and nearly kills Peter. In 2011 Nick renovates and re-opens it as The Bistro, again employing Cheryl, along with his mother Gail (Helen Worth) as cleaner. Becky McDonald (Katherine Kelly) briefly works there after her split from husband Steve (Simon Gregson). Believing that his wife Kylie Platt (Paula Lane) needed to rest due to her pregnancy, David Platt (Jack P. Shepherd) takes over her evening shifts. The Bistro loses two employees in Spring 2014 as Gloria Price (Sue Johnston) and Stella Price (Michelle Collins) both leave Weatherfield. As Leanne splits with Nick, he renames it Just Nick's.

Later, due to staffing problems, he re-hires Leanne. She agrees but only if she can be promoted to manageress. She then plans a stylish revamp. Steph Britton (Tisha Merry) also begins working at the bistro as a waitress sometime in 2014 and is later joined by Gavin Rodwell. However, "Gavin" almost loses his job in January 2015 when he reveals to Steph that his real name is in fact Andy Carver (Oliver Farnworth) and that he has stolen his friend Gavin's identity and is using it to meet his father, Michael Rodwell (Les Dennis), who is engaged to Gail. Andy keeps his job despite this.

Robert Preston (Tristan Gemmill) begins working at the bistro as its head chef in September 2015 as he begins seeing his ex-wife Tracy Barlow (Kate Ford) again. In November, Steph learns that her ex-boyfriend Jamie Bowman (James Atherton) has threatened to post intimate pictures of her online. The pictures are later posted, infuriating Steph. With Leanne's support, she phones the police and Jamie is arrested.

In January 2016, Andy and Steph's brother, Luke Britton (Dean Fagan), learns that Jamie is out on bail. They go to confront him at his new workplace, an upmarket bar. Andy reveals all to the manager, and Jamie and his friend Lee are sacked. This angers Jamie, so he and Lee plan to rob the bistro to frighten Steph. However, due to a powercut, Nick closes early so, unknown to Jamie, Steph is not there. However, Nick's fiancée Carla is in the bistro at the time of the break-in, after having a heated argument with Robert. Jamie and Lee search the restaurant but do not find any money or anything of value. Carla tells them to go while they can, but Jamie gets angry and attacks Carla. Jamie snatches Carla's bag but she runs after them. As they climb into their getaway car, Carla tries to grab her bag. Jamie starts the car and drives down the cobbles taking Carla with them. Carla is pushed from the vehicle and falls, injuring herself badly.

=== Preston's Petals ===
Preston's Petals

In-universe information
- Type: Florist
- Founded: 2016 (as Preston's Petals)
- Address: 9 Rosamund Street
- Owner: Tracy Barlow
- Key people: Mary Taylor: Florist

Preston's Petals is the florist on Rosamund Street and is owned by Tracy Barlow (Kate Ford). Peter Barlow (Chris Gascoyne) originally bought the shop in late 2008 from Dan (Matthew Crompton) and Harry Mason (Jack Ellis) after his return to Weatherfield. Shortly after, he moves into the flat above the Shop. In early 2009, Peter gets drunk while his son Simon Barlow (Alex Bain) is sleeping, he then lights a cigarette before dropping it and setting the place alight. Simon awakes to find it alight and manages to call Deirdre Barlow, who rushes out to the street and, seeing the blazing shop and flat, she fetches Luke Strong (Craig Kelly) and Tony Gordon (Gray O'Brien) to help rescue Peter, Simon and Leanne, Simon's pet rabbit.

In August 2010, Lewis Archer (Nigel Havers) cons Peter and the shop out of £4,000. After befriending new employee and Peter's stepmother Deirdre Barlow (Anne Kirkbride), he starts forging betting slips while Deirdre is not looking and tricks Leanne Battersby (Jane Danson) into believing that he has won £4,000. CCTV reveals that he sneaked behind the desk and made the betting slip after the race had ended. After passionately kissing Deirdre, to the dismay of Peter, Leanne, Ken Barlow (William Roache) and Audrey Roberts (Sue Nicholls), he escapes to Barbados. John Stape (Graeme Hawley) works here until he too goes on the run when his crimes are discovered.

On 4 September 2011, a drunken Carla Connor (Alison King) crashes her car into the front of the bookies, also running over Stella Price (Michelle Collins) who is left critically ill following the accident. In April 2013, Leanne sells her share behind Peter's back to Carla. Carla employs her brother, Rob Donovan (Marc Baylis), as a development consultant to bring Barlow's Bookies into the 21st century. When Rob is fired, he puts a bet down against Peter, which Peter cannot afford to pay. Rob wins, leading Peter to give him and Rob's girlfriend and Peter's stepsister, Tracy Barlow (Kate Ford), the bookies rent free for six months. They change it into a pawnbroker and Tracy calls it Barlow's Buys. Peter continues to rent the shop to Rob and Tracy, and the couple are annoyed when Peter increases their rent.

In 2016, Robert Preston (Tristan Gemmill) gives Tracy the idea of opening a florists. Seeing no future for Barlow's Buys, Tracy agrees and starts to plan the grand opening. In a bid to win Robert back after an argument, she calls the shop Preston's Petals.

=== Edison G. Bailey Construction ===
Construction Site
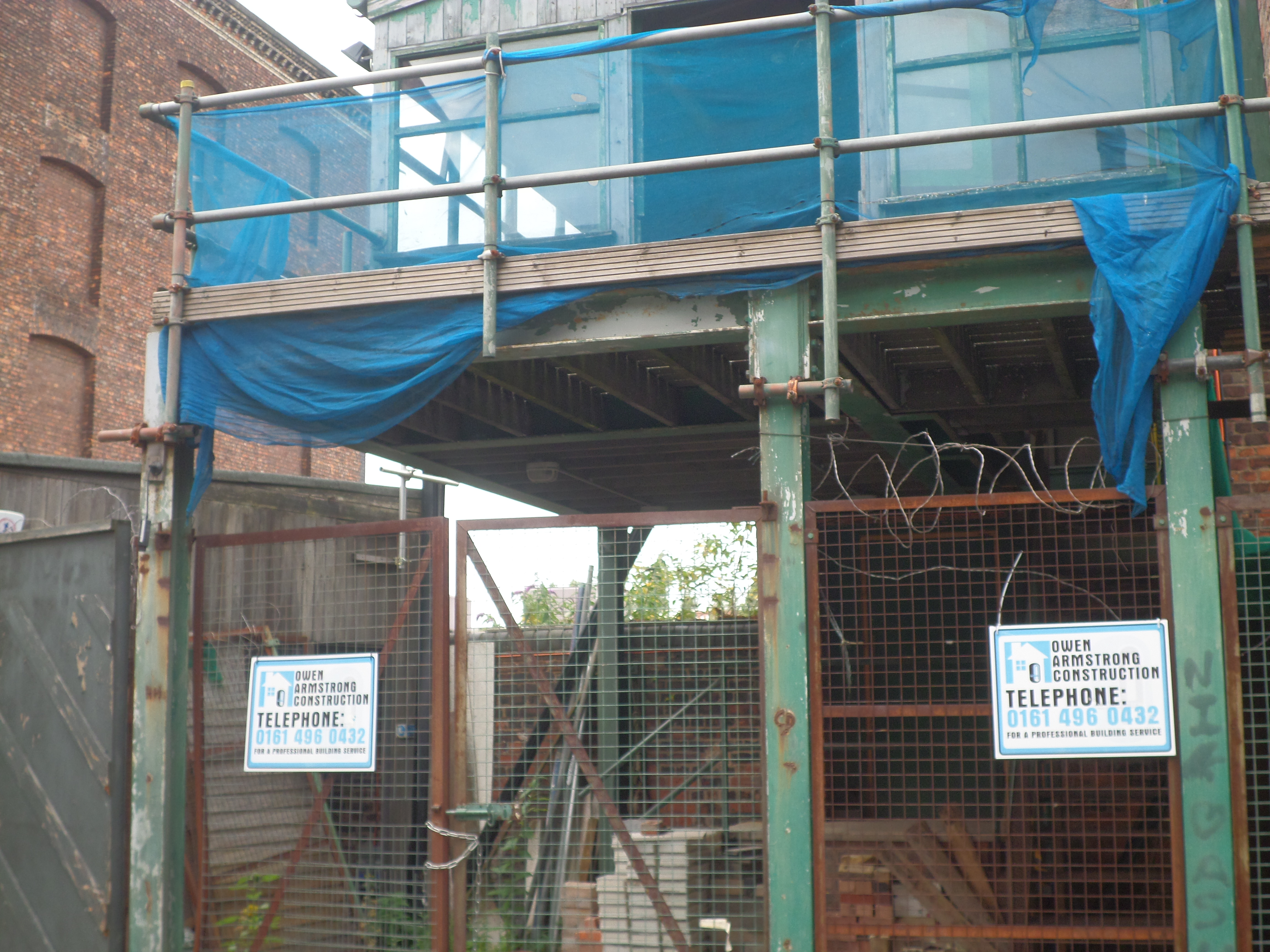
- Construction Site logo

In-universe information
- Type: Builders
- Founded: 2010 (as Owen Armstrong Construction)
- Address: 17 Victoria Street
- Owner: Ed Bailey

Ed Bailey Construction is the builder's yard situated on Victoria Street. It was formerly owned by Len Fairclough (Peter Adamson), Bill Webster (Peter Armitage), and then by Jason Grimshaw (Ryan Thomas). It is part of a chain owned by Owen Armstrong (Ian Puleston-Davies), who buys it from Bill. He keeps on Jason Grimshaw (Ryan Thomas) and hires Chris Gray (Will Thorp). Chris resigns when he discovers he has a brain tumour. In 2011, Owen hires Gary Windass (Mikey North) as a labourer and a builder, and drops Jason in late 2012. Tina McIntyre (Michelle Keegan) becomes bookkeeper in early 2013. However, Owen's daughter, Katy Armstrong (Georgia May Foote), takes over the role when Tina returns to her job at The Rovers Return. In 2014, Owen sells the yard to Jason's father, Tony Stewart (Terence Maynard) to ease his debt; Tony then gives the yard to Jason as an early birthday present. When Jason moves to Thailand in 2016, he gives control of the company to Pat Phelan (Connor McIntyre), while retaining ownership. In 2019, Gary went into debt and was later caught out and had to shut the business down, Eileen Grimshaw (Sue Cleaver) later found out about this and informed Jason of this, she then put the yard on the market. The site is currently owned by Ed Bailey (Trevor Michael Georges).

=== StreetCars ===
StreetCars
- The Original Street Cars at Coronation Street: The Tour at the former Granada Studios, Quay Street, Manchester featuring one of Stevie Mac's Cabs

In-universe information
- Type: Taxi Firm
- Founded: 2000
- Address: 15 Victoria Street
- Owner: Steve McDonald (50%); Sally Metcalfe (50%)
- Key people: Tim Metcalfe: Office manager

StreetCars is a taxi company which is situated on Victoria Street and is owned by Sally Metcalfe (Sally Dynevor) and Steve McDonald (Simon Gregson). Eileen Grimshaw (Sue Cleaver) has worked here for many years and upon her return, in 2013, managed to get her son, Todd (Bruno Langley), a job here too. After Todd is caught playing truant from StreetCars, Steve fires him and hires Gail McIntyre's (Helen Worth) new friend, Michael Rodwell (Les Dennis).

In September 2015, Lloyd Mullaney (Craig Charles) moves to Jersey to start a new life with his girlfriend, Andrea Beckett (Hayley Tamaddon). Sally later buys his share of the company and gives husband, Tim Metcalfe (Joe Duttine) a managerial role in the business.

=== Roy's Rolls ===
Roy's Rolls
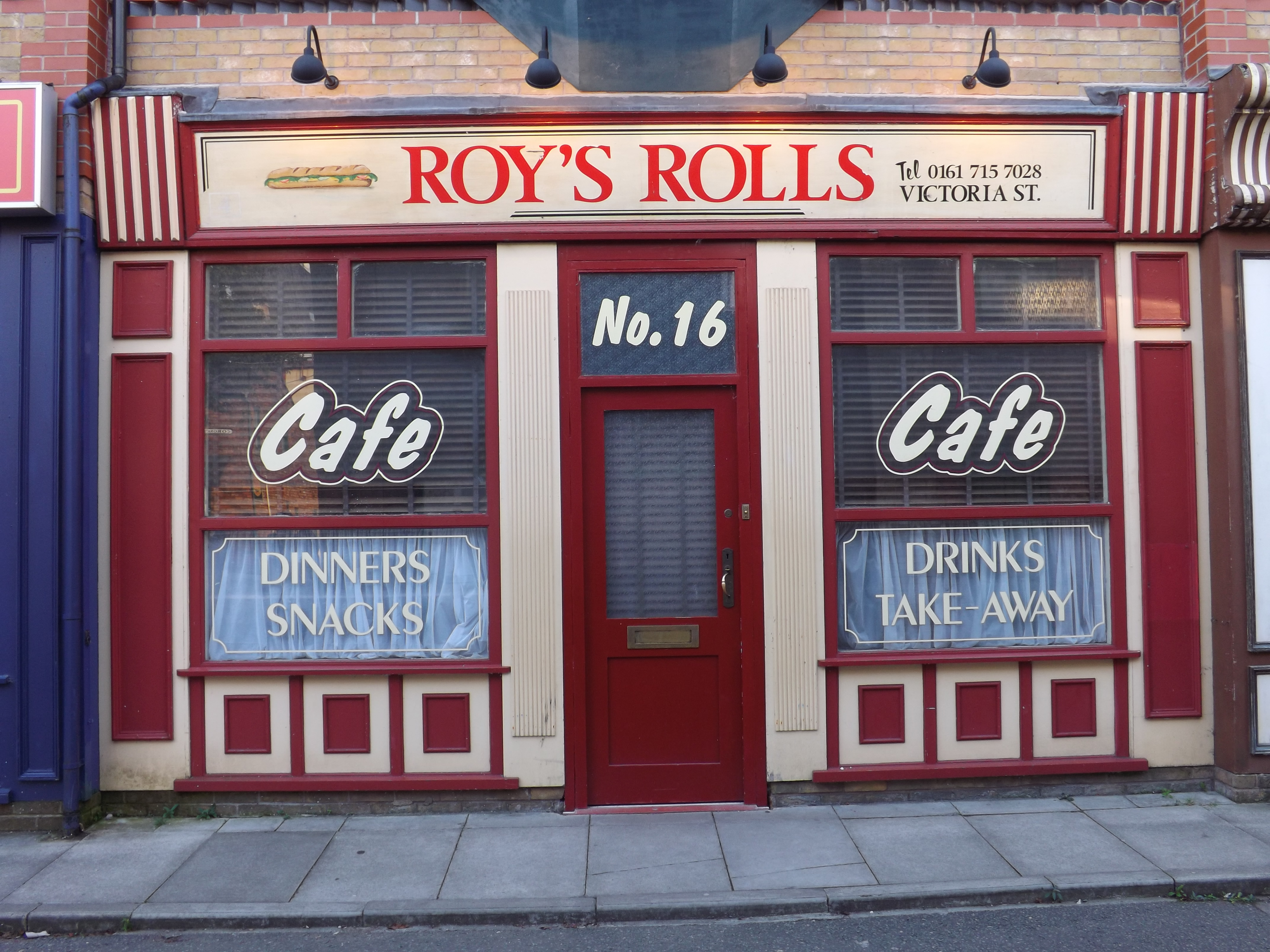
- The Original Roy's Rolls at Coronation Street: The Tour at the former Granada Studios at Quay Street, Manchester

In-universe information
- Type: Cafe
- Founded: 1998 (as Roy's Rolls)
- Address: 16 Victoria Street
- Owner: Roy Cropper
- Key people: Shona Platt: Waitress; Nina Lucas: Waitress; Bernie Winter: Waitress; Alex Warner: Waiter; Lauren Bolton: Waitress

Roy's Rolls is a café, situated on Victoria Street, which is owned by Roy Cropper (David Neilson). Hayley Cropper (Julie Hesmondhalgh), Roy's wife, was co-owner until her death in 2014. It was managed by Anna Windass (Debbie Rush) until she went to prison in 2017. Mary Taylor (Patti Clare) is a stand-in waitress here. Roy's fiancée Cathy Matthews (Melanie Hill) worked here until they separated in 2016. Shona Ramsey (Julia Goulding) and Nina Lucas (Mollie Gallagher) are currently employed at the café. It was formerly located at 12 Rosamund Street before Roy bought Gail out of the business and moved to the current premises in 1999.

=== Prima Doner ===
Prima Doner
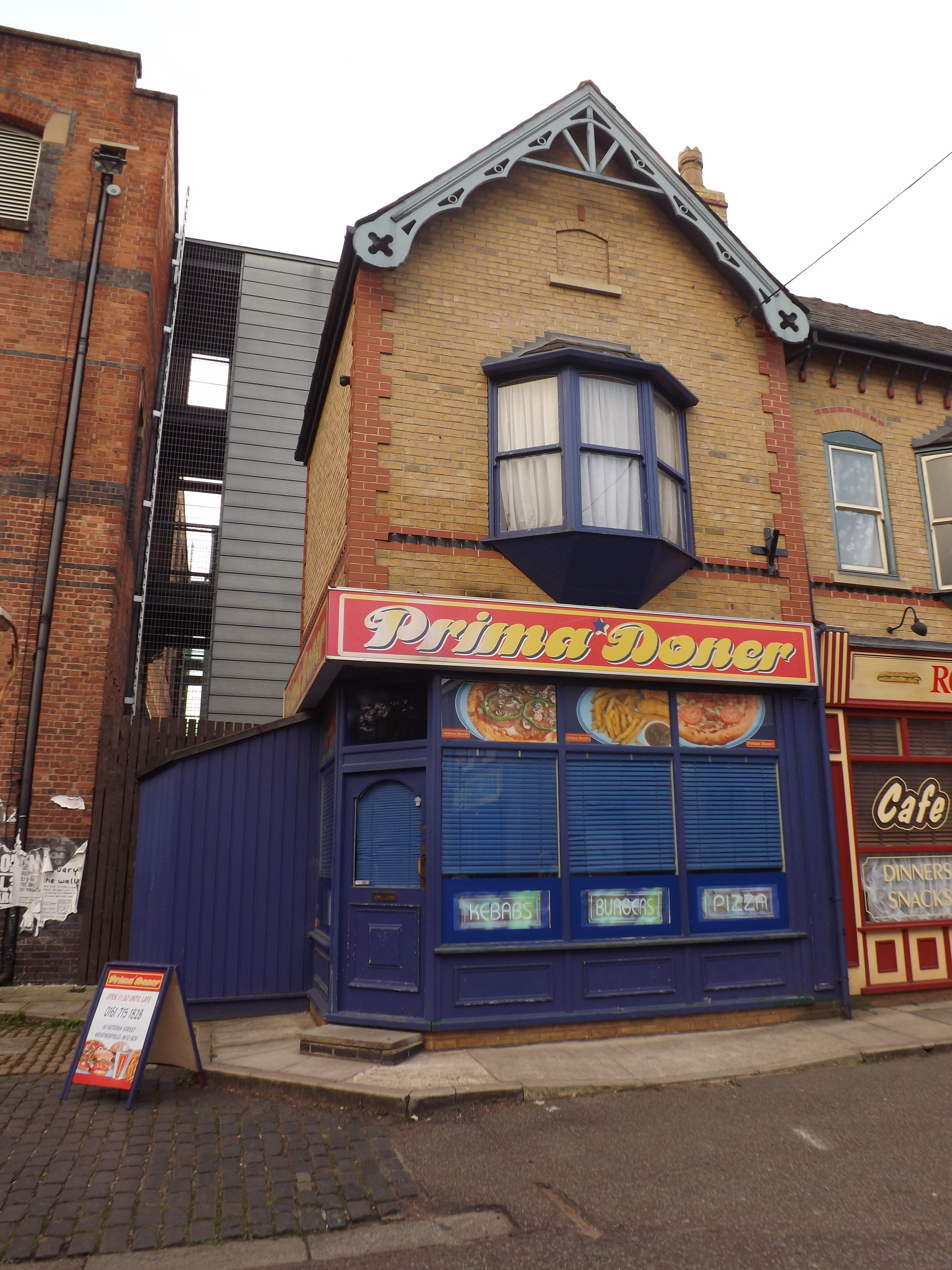
- The Original Prima Doner at Coronation Street: The Tour at the former Granada Studios at Quay Street, Manchester

In-universe information
- Type: Kebab shop
- Founded: 2008 (as Prima Doner)
- Address: 18 Victoria Street
- Owner: Dev Alahan
- Key people: Aadi Alahan: Trainee Manager; Chesney Winter-Brown: Assistant

Prima Doner is the kebab shop situated on the corner of Victoria Street, which is owned by Dev Alahan (Jimmi Harkishin).

The shop was a DIY store owned by Sally Webster (Sally Dynevor), then a Bakery owned by Diggory Compton (Eric Potts), before becoming a Kebab shop opened by Jerry Morton (Michael Starke). The shop focuses around the Morton family from its opening in 2007 until 2009, when Darryl Morton (Jonathan Dixon) leaves for Spain and sells it to Dev. Jerry, Darryl, Mel Morton (Emma Edmondson), Jodie Morton (Samantha Seager) and Teresa Bryant (Karen Henthorn) all work here between 2007 and 2009.

When the shop is sold to Dev in 2008, Mel leaves to pursue her police career. Ryan Connor (Sol Heras) and Katy Armstrong (Georgia May Foote) work here in the build–up to their affair, which leads to both the breakdown of Katy's relationship with Chesney Brown (Sam Aston) and Ryan's departure. Chesney later begins working here when the market where he works is closed down. He is later given the role of manager. Gemma Winter (Dolly-Rose Campbell) is employed to work here in 2016. Cathy Matthews (Melanie Hill) started working here in 2017.

=== Shuttleworth's Independent Funeral Services ===
Shuttleworth's Independent Funeral Services
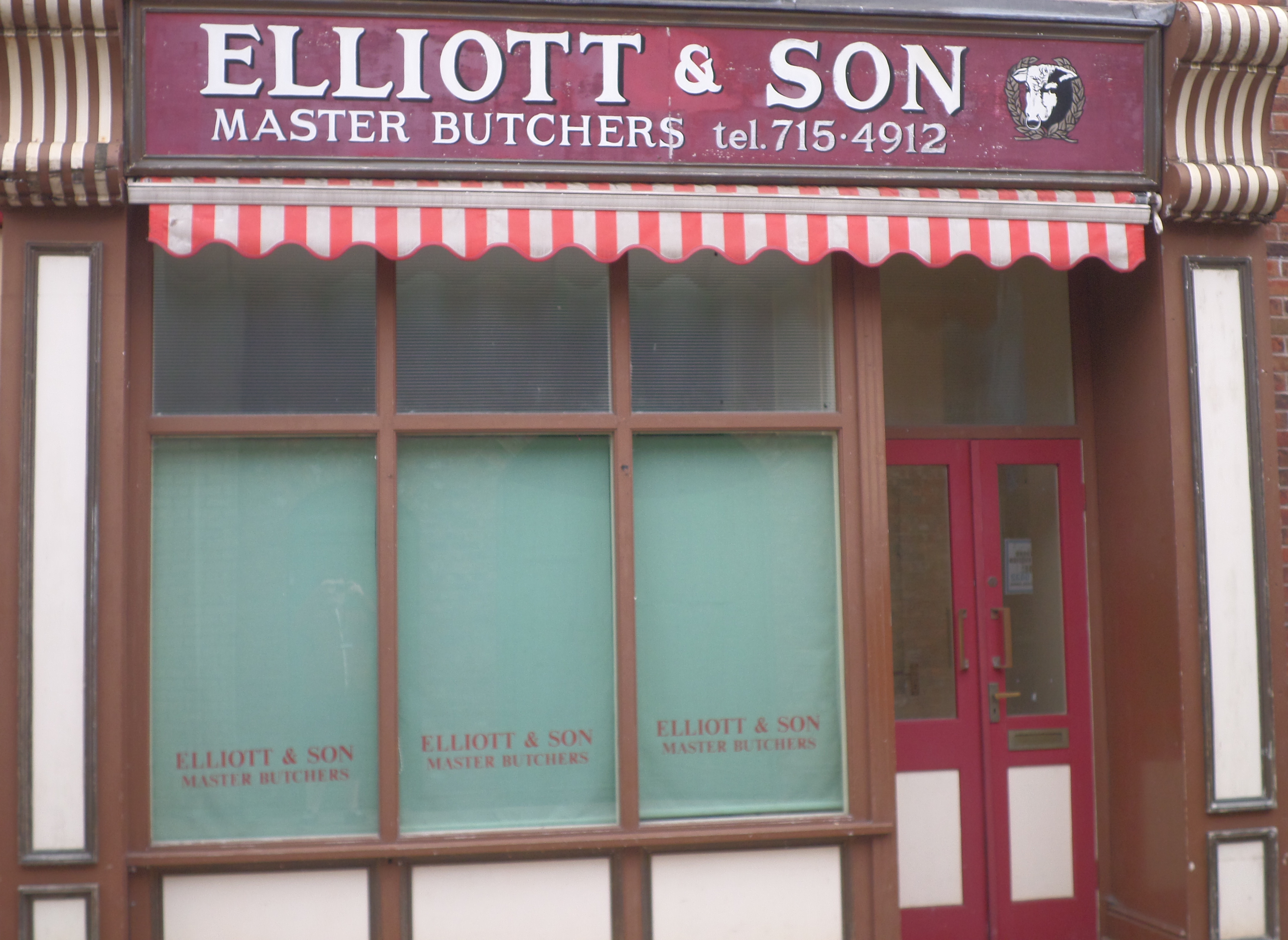
- Former shop use, Elliott and Son Master Butchers, The Jamilla House

In-universe information
- Type: Funeral Directors
- Founded: 2021 (as Shuttleworth's Independent Funeral Services)
- Address: 14 Victoria Street
- Owner: George Shuttleworth
- Key people: Todd Grimshaw: Junior Partner/Undertaker

George Shuttleworth Independent Funeral Services (formerly The Jamilla House), on Victoria Street, is a funeral directors owned by George Shuttleworth (Tony Maudsley).

In 2019, in its former as Jamilla House, the community centre was used as a temporary building for the Underworld factory following the factory roof collapse.

In 2021, upon facing money issues Yasmeen decides to sell the premises to Undertaker, George Shuttleworth who opens Shuttleworth's Independent Funeral Services.

=== For Your Fries Only: Chip Shop ===
For Your Fries Only
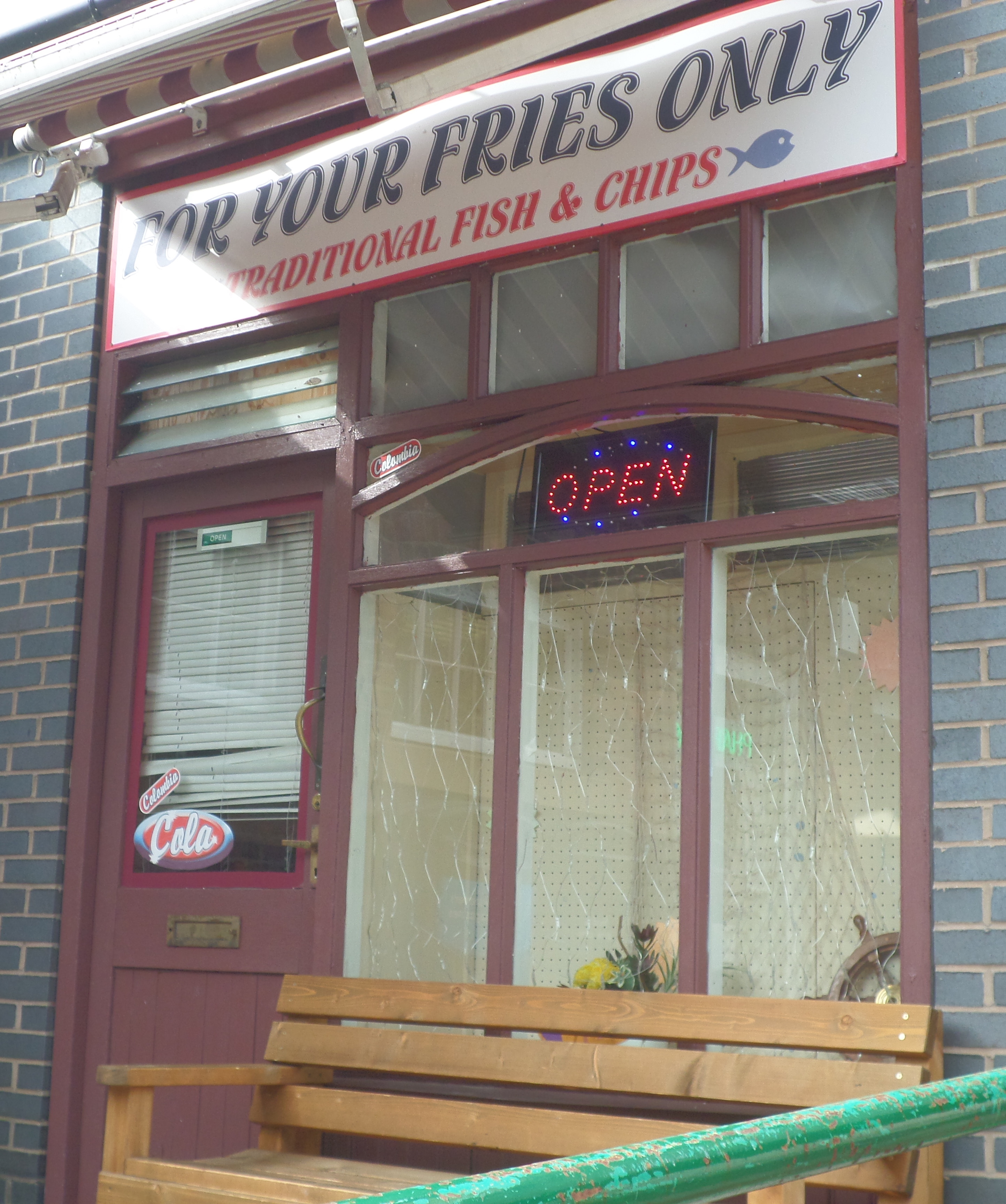
- For Your Fries Only logo

In-universe information
- Type: Fish and Chips Takeaway
- Founded: 2008
- Location: Weatherfield
- Key people: No current on-screen employees

For Your Fries Only, formerly Wong's Chip Shop, is situated on Rosamund Street next to the Medical Centre. The chip shop is introduced when Cilla Battersby-Brown (Wendi Peters) and her friend Yana Lumb (Jayne Bickerton) work there. Since their departures, the chip shop does not feature in storylines, but is only a passing reference.

=== Freshco ===
Freshco

In-universe information
- Type: Supermarket
- Founded: 2000 (as Freshco)
- Owner: Freshco Ltd.
- Key people: No current on-screen employees

Freshco is a supermarket situated in Weatherfield, formerly known as Bettabuys, and then Firman's Freezers. As Betterbuy, it was much featured in the programme but, as no current character works there, it was phased out in the early 2000s and is now only referred to occasionally by residents (usually after they have been shopping and come home with shopping bags reading Freshco). Izzy Armstrong (Cherylee Houston) works here for a time. In 2019, Chesney Brown (Sam Aston) and Gemma Winter (Dolly-Rose Campbell) are hired by Freshco with their quadruplets for a marketing campaign.

=== Turner's Joinery ===
Turner's Joinery

In-universe information
- Type: Joiner's workshop
- Founded: 2000 (as Turner's Journery)
- Owner: Mr Turner
- Key people: No current on-screen employees

Turner's Joinery is built under the viaduct archway that originally connected Coronation Street with Jubilee Terrace. It is not much mentioned recently. When Nick Tilsley (Ben Price) decides to build the bistro, he buys half of Turner's Joinery. There is, though, still part of Turner's under the viaduct, standing behind a double door not seen much because it is behind the corner shop. A large glass window was placed here sometime in the 1990s, which is smashed by Maya Sharma (Sasha Behar) in a car accident.

=== Weatherfield Garden Centre ===
Weatherfield Garden Centre

In-universe information
- Type: Garden Centre
- Founded: 2014
- Address: Unknown
- Owner: Unnamed man
- Key people: No current on-screen employees.

Weatherfield Garden Centre is first seen on 3 July 2014, as the workplace of burglar Michael Rodwell (Les Dennis). It is visited by David Platt (Jack P. Shepherd), his wife Kylie (Paula Lane) and his stepson Max Turner (Harry McDermott). David and Kylie confront Michael but then Max disappears. They find a worried Max locked inside a shed. Kylie immediately breaks the shed door to rescue Max and Michael claims it was him so that Kylie would not be in trouble with his boss. Michael is later dismissed from the garden centre and Gail McIntyre (Helen Worth) finds him a job at StreetCars.

=== Trim Up North ===
Trim Up North

In-universe information
- Type: Barber shop
- Founded: 2019
- Owner: Audrey Roberts
- Key people: Maria Connor: Manager/Hairdresser; David Platt: Hairdresser

Trim Up North is a barber shop owned by Audrey Roberts (Sue Nicholls). David Platt (Jack P. Shepherd) and Nick Tilsley (Ben Price) opened the barber shop with the £90,000 inheritance money that Nick and Natalie Watkins (Cassie Bradley) stole from Audrey. In June 2019, David asked Adam Barlow (Sam Robertson) to officially sign over the ownership of the barber shop to Audrey as a way of giving back what he stole from her. Audrey takes pity on David and hires him as a stylist with Maria Connor (Samia Longchambon) being in charge of the management of the shop.

== Pubs ==
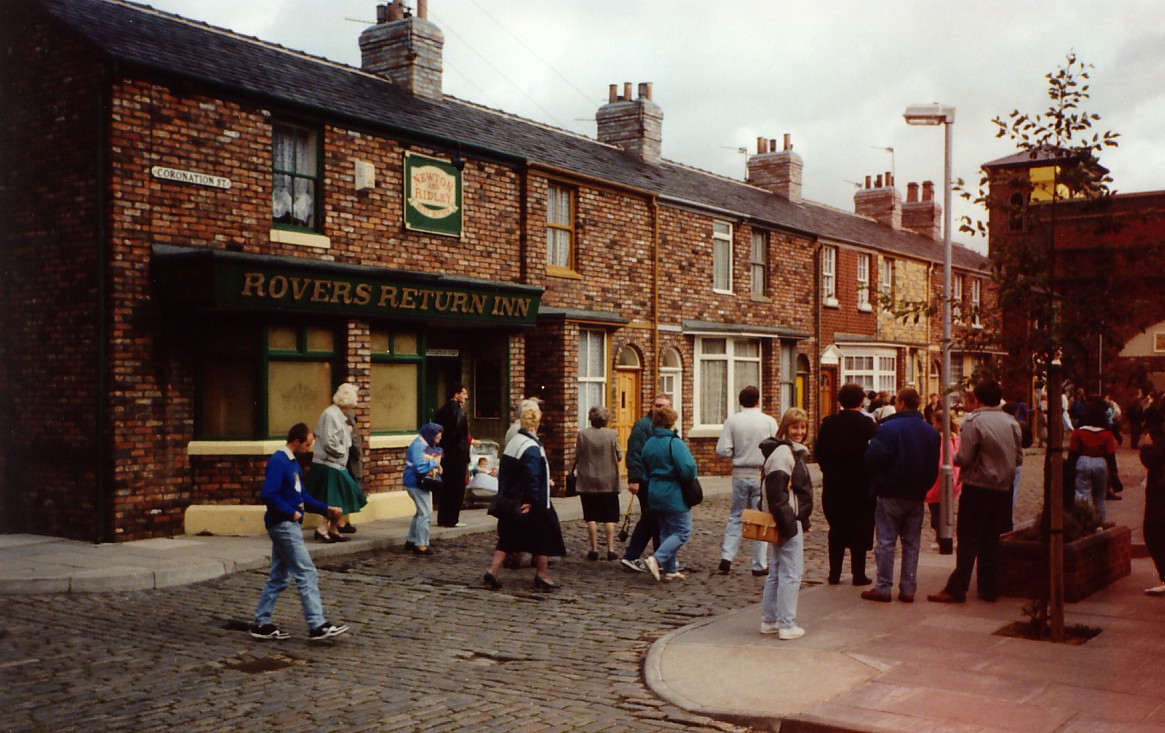
The Rovers Return Inn, located at the end of the titular Coronation Street

=== Newton and Ridley ===
The Newton and Ridley Brewery was established in Weatherfield in 1781. During the 19th century, Newton and Ridley expanded its operations, moving towards the acquisition and construction of new public houses. There is a pub crawl called the Weatherfield 7.

=== The Rovers Return Inn ===
In 1902 Newton & Ridley acquired the freehold to the newly built public house on Coronation Street. The pub was named Rovers Return Inn and is the principal meeting place in Coronation Street. Although the house is no longer owned by Newton and Ridley, the brewery's products are still available. Jenny Connor currently owns the pub, though there have been many previous owners. An electrical fault in 1986 resulted in a fire which destroyed the bar. Another big fire in 2013 was caused by Karl Munro (John Michie) in attempt to frame Jason Grimshaw (Ryan Thomas), who was trying to fix an electrical fault.

The name was chosen because of the historic Rover's Return in Withy Grove, Manchester, which occupied a 14th-century building. At some period it became a licensed house but ceased to be so in 1924. The building stood until 1958 when the City Council had it demolished.

=== The Flying Horse ===
In 1850, Newton and Ridley opened The Flying Dutchman at the corner of Jubilee Terrace. The name was changed in 1905 to The Flying Horse for patriotic reasons. Until around 1985, The Flying Horse was the biggest rival pub to the Rovers Return, with the regulars from both houses clashing in many friendly contests such as a tug-of-war, mixed football and pub Olympics.

The pub was reintroduced in 2009; however, it is now filled with dodgy characters. Beth Sutherland (Lisa George) mentioned the Flying Horse in July 2017 when talking to Roy Cropper (David Neilson).

=== The Laughing Donkey ===
The Laughing Donkey can be found on Omdurman Street, overlooking North Cross Park. It was the stronghold of Nellie Harvey (Mollie Sugden), acquaintance and nemesis of Rovers Return landlady, Annie Walker.

=== The Queens ===
The Queens was built in 1931 and is situated towards the 'trendy' Weatherfield Quays, south of Weatherfield. The pub was introduced to Coronation Street in 1993, when former Rovers Landlady Liz McDonald (Beverley Callard) was installed as landlady by Newton and Ridley.

=== The Weatherfield Arms ===
Another rival to The Rovers Return, The Weatherfield Arms, appeared around 2003. The location of the pub is unknown. Liz McDonald (Beverley Callard) was the manager for a while here after she lost her job at The Rovers Return. Other Coronation Street residents such as Bev Unwin (Susie Blake) and Cilla Battersby-Brown (Wendi Peters) have been employed here.

=== The Farrier's Arms ===
The Farrier's Arms was an early rival to The Rovers Return, mentioned in the first year or two by regular cast in 1960 and 1961. Corner shop owner Florrie Lindley (Betty Alberge) worked there for 4 years before turning her attentions to shop-keeping. Eventually, it was mentioned less and less, especially after Florrie left. The pub had not been mentioned for almost half a century, until Tyrone Dobbs told Kevin Webster in 2023 that the Farriers had closed down.

=== The Dog & Gun ===
The Dog & Gun first appeared in October 2014, when Kylie Platt (Paula Lane) reacquainted with her ex-boyfriend, Callum Logan (Sean Ward) when she revisited the estate that she used to live on. Kylie's half-sister Becky McDonald (Katherine Kelly) was also notorious around the estate, and known to the regulars of The Dog & Gun. Since then, many characters from the estate have appeared in the show, including Gemma Winter (Dolly-Rose Campbell), Macca Hibbs (Gareth Berliner), Clayton Hibbs (Callum Harrison), Shona Platt (Julia Goulding), Roxy Ward (Claudia Adshead), Zoe White (Keeley Fitzgerald), Dane Hibbs (Simon Naylor), Paul Foreman (Peter Ash), Bernie Winter (Jane Hazlegrove), Kel Hinchley (Joseph Alessi), Kit Green (Jacob Roberts), Denny Foreman (Danny Cunningham), Mick Michaelis (Joe Layton), Lou Michaelis (Farrel Hegarty), Brody Michaelis (Ryan Mulvey), and Jodie Ramsey (Olivia Frances-Brown).

== Restaurants ==
=== Valandro's ===
Valandro's is an Italian restaurant. It was previously used as a secondary setting to restaurants such as The Clock, until bought by Carla Connor (Alison King) and Leanne Battersby (Jane Danson) in May 2007. After the unexpected death of Paul Connor (Sean Gallagher), however, Carla pulls out of the transaction, leaving Leanne to fund the cost of buying the business herself. She uses money earned from being an escort, combined with a £10,000 loan from Roger Stiles (Andrew Dunn). Amidst a plethora of financial trouble and staffing problems, in July 2007 Leanne hires Paul Clayton (Tom Hudson) to work at the restaurant as head chef. Paul later takes out a loan in his grandfather Jack Duckworth's (Bill Tarmey) name and buys a share of the restaurant. The business was failing so, in 2008 Leanne convinces Paul to set fire to the restaurant to claim the insurance, resulting in Paul fleeing the country.

=== The Royal Panda ===
The Royal Panda is a Chinese restaurant. It was introduced as the workplace of Xin Chiang (Elizabeth Tan) when Tina McIntyre (Michelle Keegan) and Graeme Proctor (Craig Gazey) go to visit her.

=== Speed Daal ===
Speed Daal is a Pakistani restaurant located on Victoria Street. It is owned by Alya Nazir (Sair Khan), Leanne Battersby (Jane Danson) and Elaine Jones (Paula Wilcox) and first appeared in April 2018. Current on-screen employees are Leanne and Alya. Yasmeen Nazir (Shelley King) sold her stake in the business shortly prior to her departure in 2025.

== Health ==
=== Weatherfield General Hospital ===
Weatherfield General Hospital

The main NHS medical facilities are located at Weatherfield General Hospital. The wards at the hospital are named after singers including George Formby and Gracie Fields. Martin Platt (Sean Wilson), Rebecca Hopkins (Jill Halfpenny), Karl Foster (Chris Finch), Todd Grimshaw (Bruno Langley) and Marcus Dent (Charlie Condou) have all worked at the hospital, while Emily Bishop (Eileen Derbyshire) also did voluntary work for the hospital. Jake Windass was born here in May 2013, while Hayley Cropper (Julie Hesmondhalgh) was diagnosed with pancreatic cancer in July 2013. In May 2014, Lloyd Mullaney (Craig Charles) was rushed to Weatherfield General Hospital after suffering a heart attack, and Sarah Platt's (Tina O'Brien) baby son Billy was born and died here. A pregnant Kylie Platt (Paula Lane) also took a trip to Weatherfield General Hospital in January 2013 after falling off a table while drunk in The Rovers Return, and David Platt (Jack P. Shepherd) and Nick Tilsley (Ben Price) were both rushed here after a horrific lorry accident in August 2013.

=== Rosamund Street Medical Centre ===
The medical practice situated on the junction between Rosamund Street and Coronation Street. Gail Platt (Helen Worth) was employed as a receptionist at the practice, until 2010 when she lost the job for reading private medical records. Two former Coronation Street residents, Dr. Matt Ramsden (Stephen Beckett) and Dr. Matt Carter (Oliver Mellor) were employed there while they both lived in Weatherfield respectively. In 2016, Rana Habeeb (Bhavna Limbachia) began working here as a nurse. Deirdre Barlow (Anne Kirkbride) and Liz McDonald (Beverley Callard) have also worked at the Medical Centre as receptionists. Moira Pollock (Louiza Patikas) is the manageress of the Medical Centre.

The Medical Centre also features a Pharmacy which was briefly used in the story line of Joe McIntyre's (Reece Dinsdale) drug addiction. The pharmacy is not seen apart from the green pharmacy sign in the window of the medical centre.

=== V COURT Health and Fitness ===
V COURT Health and Fitness

In-universe information
- Type: Gym
- Founded: 2014
- Location: Weatherfield
- Owner: Dev Alahan
- Key people: Dev Alahan – Co-owner (50%); Sharif Nazir – Co-owner (25%); Gary Windass- Co-owner (25%); Alya Nazir – Receptionist; Gail Platt – Cleaner

A joint venture between local businessman Dev Alahan (Jimmi Harkishin) and personal trainer Kal Nazir (Jimi Mistry). Kal's father, Sharif (Marc Anwar), also has shares within the business. The facility was used by many local residents including Gail McIntyre (Helen Worth), Nick Tilsley (Ben Price), Gary Windass (Mikey North), Mary Taylor (Patti Clare), Eva Price (Catherine Tyldesley), Steve McDonald (Simon Gregson), Sarah Platt (Tina O'Brien), Zeedan Nazir (Qasim Akhtar), Bethany Platt (Lucy Fallon), Callum Logan (Sean Ward) and Jason Grimshaw (Ryan Thomas). The gym has not appeared since 2016. It went bankrupt, and the former staff have new jobs.

== Transport ==
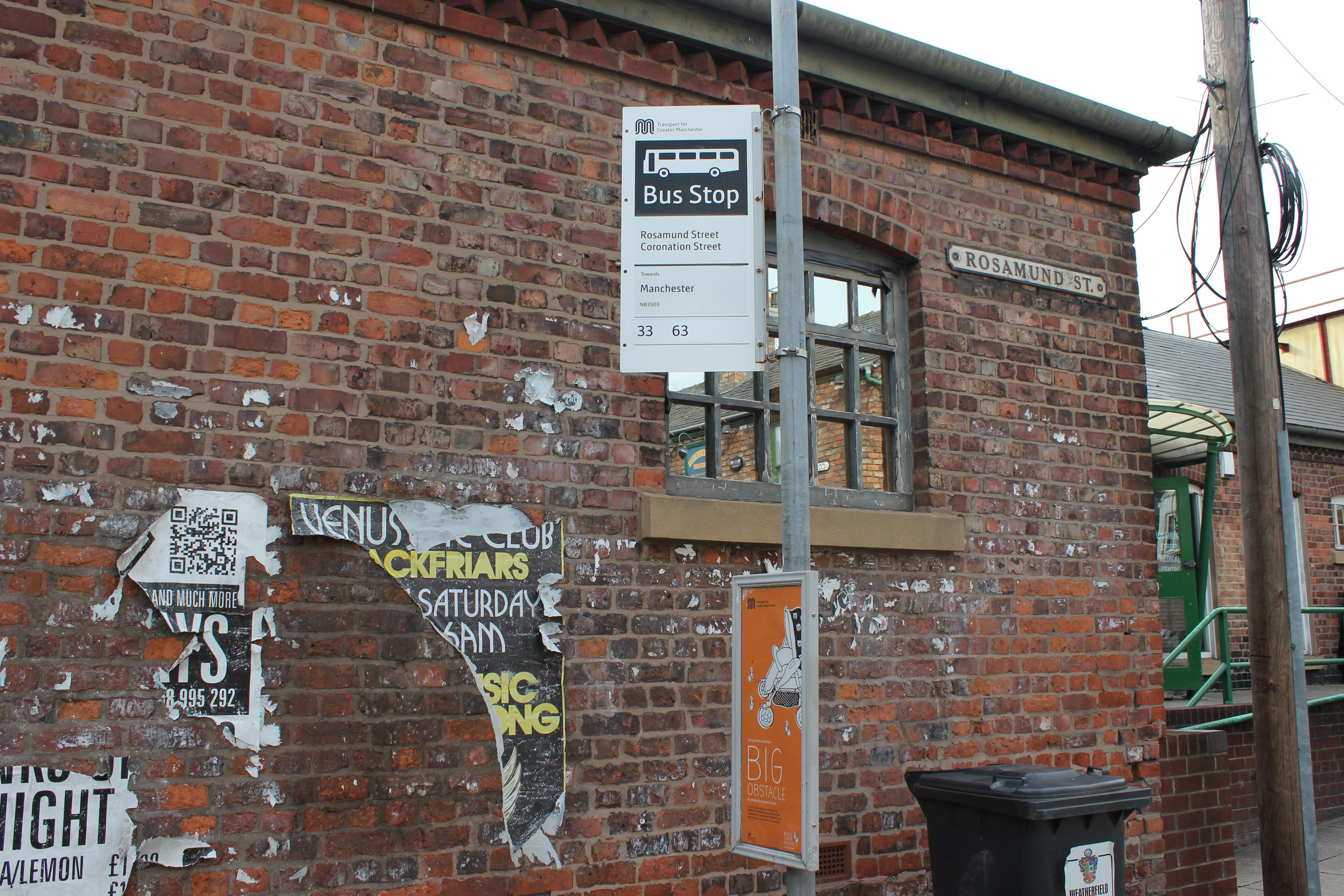
The Rosamund Street bus stop

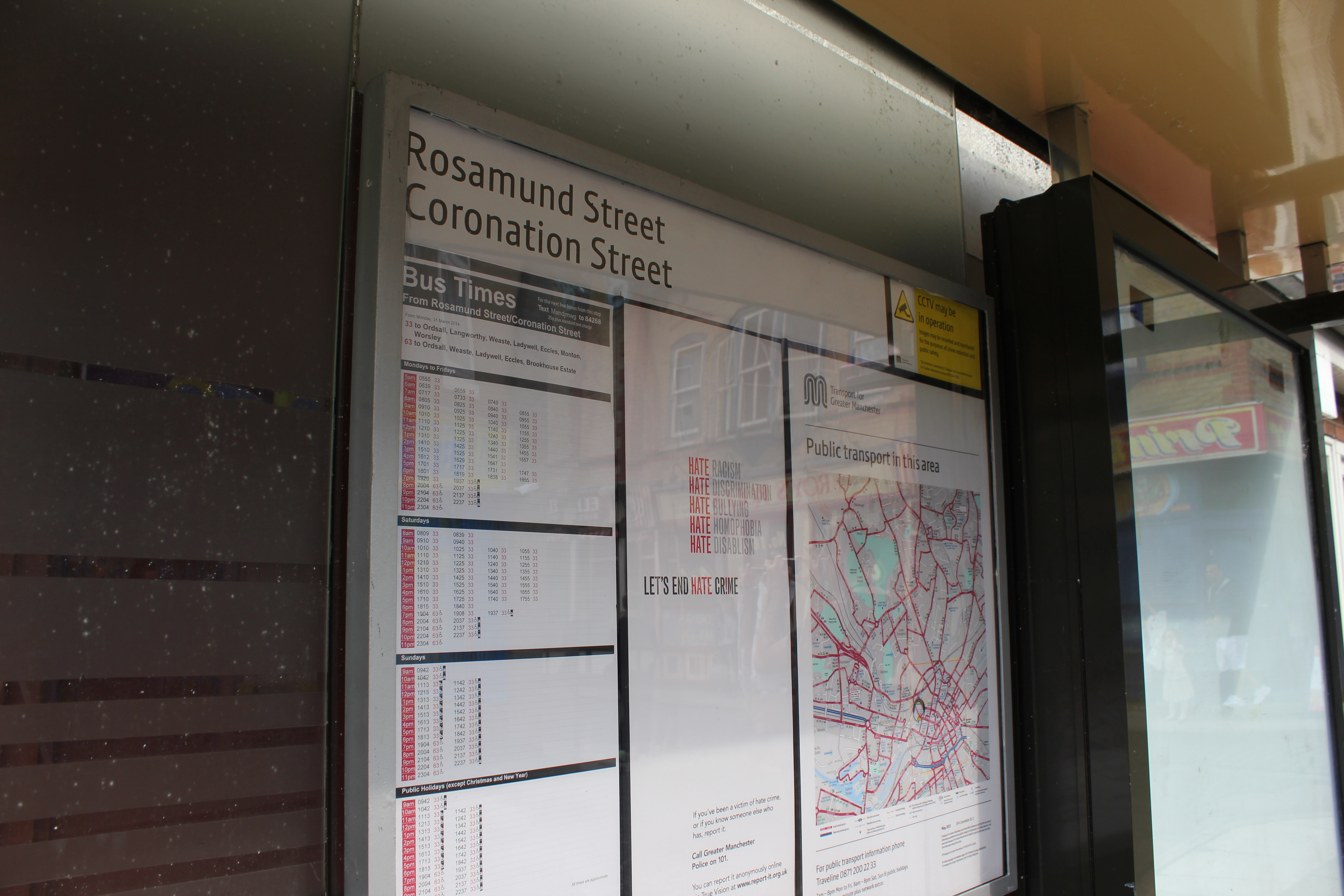
The Rosamund Street/Coronation Street bus stop

Various forms of public transport can be encountered in Weatherfield. One of them is a bus service called the Weatherfield Wayfarer, which is boarded at a stop on Rosamund Street. A bus shelter there provides Weatherfield residents with a comfortable wait guarded from the elements; however, when Victoria Street was closed due to the construction of the Victoria Court apartment complex, an alternative route was in operation, served by a temporary bus stop located outside the Medical Centre on the opposite side of Rosamund Street. The bus used in the series is currently provided by Stagecoach Manchester, often using a Middleton depot vehicle, and is branded with the Weatherfield Wayfarer name. This, however, is not the case on occasion where a substitution from a smaller bus operators in the Greater Manchester area is used.

GM Buses vehicles were on occasion provided in the 1980s and 1990s when required, but following the deregulation of bus services, private bus operators took over the contract with Granada to provide a bus as and when required. Optare Solo vehicles are usually found as at 2020; however, other vehicles have been used.

Trams are also in operation through Weatherfield. Although most residents appear to prefer taking the bus, it was revealed that Deirdre Barlow took the tram to work (at the council offices in central Manchester), when she arrived home with stained clothes as "someone spilt coffee down me on't tram". The tram, based on the Metrolink network, runs along the viaduct on Viaduct Street, which separates Coronation Street and Jubilee Terrace. Although the Metrolink system opened in 1992, a tram stop did not appear on screen until 2018, when it was incorporated in a new Coronation Street set unveiled by Granada Television. The newly added tram stop, called Weatherfield North, made its first television appearance in April 2018.

The episode broadcast on 6 December 2010 featured a disaster storyline, in which an out-of-service tram crashed off the viaduct at the end of Coronation Street after a gas blast at The Joinery broke the line. The track was damaged, causing a derailment which sent the front end of the tram into Dev and Sunita's corner shop and the other end into The Kabin. It is not the first time in Weatherfield's history that such a disaster has happened; there was a derailment of a goods train in 1967.
