= Percy Sugden =

Fictional character in Coronation Street

- Coronation Street character
- Portrayed by: Bill Waddington
- Duration: 1983–1997
- First appearance: 22 August 1983
- Last appearance: 20 October 1997
- Introduced by: Mervyn Watson
In-universe information
- Occupation: Army cook (retired); Caretaker (retired)
- Sisters: Millie Prior
- Wife: Mary Jackson (backstory)
- Nieces: Elaine Prior; Frances Prior

Percy Sugden is a fictional character from the British ITV soap opera Coronation Street, played by Bill Waddington. He appeared between 1983 and 1997.

== Creation and development ==
The character was introduced to Coronation Street as a potential caretaker of the Community centre. Percy's niece, Elaine Prior (Judy Gridley), stayed with him until she married Bill Webster (Peter Armitage). Percy was also a school crossing guard, and for much of his time on the Street was portrayed as a nosey, cantankerous and often "busybody" type who liked to involve himself in the lives of others. Percy would frequently offer his opinions and insights whether they were appreciated or not.

Writers created a partnership between Percy and Phyllis Pearce (Jill Summers). Phyllis is portrayed as having unrequited love for Percy, who makes his feelings known. Despite this, Phyllis never gives up the pursuit of romance with Percy. Writers played them in comedic scenes, such as a trip to Southport where Phyllis hides Percy's socks and shoes while he is paddling in the sea. This causes them to miss the coach home, so Phyllis can spend more time with him alone. Phyllis' adoration of Percy intensified when works as a lollipop man and saves Phyllis from being run over. In a 1996 plot, Phyllis' rival Maud Grimes (Elizabeth Bradley) reads her teacup and revealed the man of Phyllis' dreams was waiting for her. She responds by asking Percy to marry her, but he thinks Phyllis was pranking him and leaves abruptly.The two characters later move into the same retirement complex at Mayfield Court.

== Storylines ==
Percy arrived on the Street in August 1983 as the new caretaker at the Community centre. Old soldier Percy had been a cook in the Army serving with the Eighth Army in North Africa whose proudest boast was: "When you've made gravy under shell fire, you can do anything!". He had little family, but was close to his niece, Elaine Prior (Judy Gridley), who married Bill Webster (Peter Armitage) in 1985.

In 1983, Percy suggested to Mavis Riley (Thelma Barlow) that his pet budgie, Randy, should mate with her pet budgie, Harriet. Mavis was not happy with the idea.

In 1987, Percy formed the Percy Sugden Formation Dancers, containing local notables such as Hilda Ogden (Jean Alexander) and Phyllis Pearce (Jill Summers). He encouraged them to an enter a local dance contest - however, fed up with his bossiness, the dancers finally ousted Percy and elected a new chairman. Percy reacted by cancelling the group's entry in the dance contest, and informing them that new entries were no longer being accepted. Percy decided to be a good neighbour, making regular visits to Alf Roberts (Bryan Mosley), who was recovering from a heart attack; Alf was horrified when insensitive Percy told him stories of other heart attack victims who had not been so lucky to survive.

Upon reaching retirement age in 1988, Percy was forced to leave his flat at the Community Centre and move out of the Street. Miserable at being away from the neighbourhood, he slumped into lethargy until Emily Bishop (Eileen Derbyshire) took pity on him and moved him in as her lodger at No 3. Percy was delighted, but Mavis initially reacted with some jealousy. When Mavis married Derek Wilton (Peter Baldwin) later that year, Percy was thrilled to act as best man (although nobody had actually asked him) and took it upon himself to see that Derek made it to the wedding this time, having heard of their failed wedding in 1978.

Like Albert Tatlock (Jack Howarth) and Ena Sharples (Violet Carson) before him, Percy was disappointed by many of the "doings" of the younger generation. When Brian Tilsley (Christopher Quinten) was stabbed and killed outside a nightclub in 1989, Percy blamed it on "Acid Drops" (acid house), stating that in his day, "people attending George Formby concerts hadn't come dashing out stabbing folk!".

Percy had unwanted female attention, thanks mainly to Phyllis Pearce and Maud Grimes (Elizabeth Bradley). Phyllis pursued him for most of the 1980s and into the 1990s, and sought to make him jealous by being seen around with other local pensioners, including Sam Tindall (Tom Mennard) and Arnold Swift (Harry Littlewood); Percy remained unmoved.

In 1997, Percy's happy life in the Street was shattered when the Battersby family moved in next-door. Percy couldn't stand his boisterous new neighbours, so he decided to move into a retirement complex at Mayfield Court. By 1998, Percy was still living in Mayfield Court with Phyllis Pearce and they had recently been joined by Maud Grimes.

== Reception ==
Along with Stafford Hildred, actor Bill Waddington wrote a book about his character called The importance of being Percy, which was released in 1992. In a 1990 poll ran by Woman magazine, readers voted Waddington as one of the least popular "soap stars".
