= Phyllis Pearce =

Fictional character from Coronation Street

- Coronation Street character
- Portrayed by: Jill Summers
- Duration: 1982–1996
- First appearance: 20 September 1982
- Last appearance: 1 May 1996
- Introduced by: Bill Podmore (1982); Mervyn Watson (1984)
In-universe information
- Occupation: Waitress; Cleaner
- Father: Joshua Grimes
- Mother: Violet Grimes
- Husband: Harold Pearce (backstory)
- Daughters: Margaret Whiteley
- Grandsons: Craig Whitely

Phyllis Pearce is a fictional character from the British ITV soap opera Coronation Street, played by Jill Summers. She made her first appearance as Phyllis during the episode broadcast on 20 September 1982. She is introduced into the series as the grandmother of Craig Whitely (Mark Price). Phyllis is characterised as a pensioner, who has a blue-rinse hairstyle and a distinct tone to her voice. She takes a waitress job at Jim's Café and assumes the role of a gossiping woman. In her initial stories, Phyllis is portrayed at odds with Craig's paternal grandfather Chalkie Whitely (Teddy Turner), who she accuses of being an unfit parental guardian. In Phyllis' backstory, her husband Harold and her daughter, Margaret had died. Craig's father, Bob Whitely (Freddie Fletcher) decides to emigrate to Australia and Chalkie later joins them, leaving Phyllis without any family. Summers was only contracted to appear for a couple of weeks, but the character's popularity convinced producers to make Phyllis a permanent character in the series.

Writers developed an on-screen partnership between Phyllis and fellow pensioner, Percy Sugden (Bill Waddington). They portrayed Phyllis as determined to romance Percy, who takes a dislike to Phyllis. It formed the basis of numerous comedic storylines throughout their tenure, as Phyllis never gave up her hapless pursuit of Percy. In another story, Phyllis romances Sam Tindall (Tom Mennard), but this ends due to her infatuation with Percy. Producers reduced the role from 1994 onwards due to Summers' health deteriorating. She made her final appearance during the episode broadcast on 1 May 1996. Writers depicted Phyllis as moving to sheltered accommodation to facilitate Summers' absence, but she did not return and Summers died on 11 January 1997.

Phyllis has been well received by television critics for her pursuit of romance with Percy. She has been described as a battleaxe type of character, and noticeable via her blue rinse hair and gruff voice. She has appeared in lists of the show's greatest characters and has been described as a "forgotten gem" of the show.

== Casting ==
Summers had previously played the role of Bessie Proctor in 1972, a cleaner who worked with Hilda Ogden (Jean Alexander) at the Capricorn Club venue. Summers believed that Bessie's behaviour in the show meant there was no chance of the character reappearing. This caused her to assume she would never get the opportunity to appear in Coronation Street again. Despite this, ten years later she was cast as Phyllis. When Summers took on the role of Phyllis, she expected it only to last a couple of weeks, which was the length of her original contract. Phyllis proved popular with viewers and producers asked Summers to stay on. The role was expanded and Summers was kept on to build the character further.

== Development ==
=== Characterisation and introduction ===
Phyllis is introduced into the series as the grandmother of Craig Whitely (Mark Price). She tracks Craig down to Number 9 Coronation Street, where he is living with his paternal grandfather Chalkie Whitely (Teddy Turner). Phyllis' daughter Margaret had previously died of cancer and Craig moved in with Chalkie following her death. Phyllis is also widowed when she debuts and she decides to reconnect with Craig because he is her only remaining living family. When Chalkie moved to Coronation Street, he decided not to tell Phyllis his new address because he wanted to exclude her from their life, due to her interfering ways. Craig's father, Bob Whitely (Freddie Fletcher) goes to work on an oil rig and leaves Craig in Chalkie's care.

In the book, Around the Coronation Street Houses, author Daran Little revealed that Phyllis and Chalkie had previously lived on Cromwell Street together and the pair did not get along. Chalkie was upset when his son, Bob married into the Pearce family via his wedding to Margaret. Phyllis believed that Chalkie was a chauvinist and he viewed her as cantankerous. When Phyllis reconnects with Craig, she urges him to move into her home instead but he tells Phyllis he prefers living with his grandfather. Chalkie allows Phyllis to remain in contact with Craig. She continues to appear in numerous episodes visiting Craig and taking every opportunity to criticise Chalkie's suitability as a parental guardian. Producers introduced Bob into the series later that year and he announces that he is moving to Australia and taking Craig with him. Writers portrayed Phyllis as pleading with Bob to reconsider, fearing she will never see her grandson again. Bob also orders Chalkie to sell the house and Phyllis tries to get him to move in with her. He refuses but then wins money on a horse racing bet. He decides to use the money to purchase a plane ticket to Australia. Phyllis was distraught over Chalkie's departure because he was her last link to her family. Phyllis loses her home in nearby Omdurman Street and moves into a bungalow in Gorton Close.

In her backstory, Phyllis is a widow and she was married to Harold Pearce. Phyllis later gains employment at Jim's Café. Phyllis is characterised by her interfering ways and her trademark blue-rinse hair style. She is also "man-mad", often portrayed trying to find a new partner. Another memorable characteristic of Phyllis is her husky voice. Summers was given the opportunity to develop Phyllis' character and she used her vast showbusiness knowledge to build the character. She told Little in his book, The Coronation Street Story that "I loved it and then Phyllis grew on me and grew up as a character." Summers added that Phyllis is a "lonely lady" who just wanted some company. In the book Coronation Street, 1960-1985 : 25 Years, Graham Nown profiled her as "bossy, blue-rinsed" Phyllis who "likes a man who gets things done." He added that she is portrayed as making Chalkie's "life a misery" via her "constant carping". Phyllis later loses her job at Jim's Café and takes employment as Des Barnes' (Philip Middlemiss) housekeeper. Summers is ten years older than her character who was written as aged sixty-five in 1986. Summers believed it was easy to play a younger character because she had previously played older characters and needed make-up applied. She told Phil Penfold from Evening Chronicle that "it's a doddle" and "with Phyllis I don't need all that and I do enjoy playing her."

=== Percy Sugden ===
Writers created a partnership between Phyllis and Percy Sugden (Bill Waddington), which lasted throughout most of her duration. Phyllis is portrayed as having unrequited love for Percy, who makes his feelings known. Despite this, Phyllis never gives up the pursuit of romance with Percy. Nown assessed that Phyllis "visibly melts in his presence" but he always refuses to succumb to her advances. Summers believed that Phyllis is a lonely woman who latches onto Percy for comfort. She told Graeme Kay, author of Life in the Street that "Percy can't stand Phyllis but he does use her. Wherever he goes, she chases him." Summers opined that some women think "boring men" such as Percy are "marvellous" and Phyllis certainly does. She added that Percy "can do no wrong for Phyllis, talking about Burma and the war. She's very lonely, really, and all she can think of is Percy, even though she knows he doesn't want her, but he's her life."

Writers played them in comedic scenes, such as a trip to Southport where Phyllis hides Percy's socks and shoes while he is paddling in the sea. This causes them to miss the coach home, so Phyllis can spend more time with him alone. Phyllis' adoration of Percy intensified when works as a lollipop man and saves Phyllis from being run over. In a 1986 plot, Phyllis has a birthday party at the café and Percy is mean to her. Summers told Penfold from Evening Chronicle that Percy was "downright bloody rude" to Phyllis during the scenes. In a 1987 storyline, writers featured Phyllis turning her romantic attentions to Sam Tindall (Tom Mennard). He is a friend of Percy's at the local bowls club. Phyllis realises he is wealthy from a prize gained winning a pool competition and pursues him. She uses Percy to make Sam jealous, but her plan fails when Sam thinks she has loose morals. Phyllis blames Percy for Sam's decision, leaving him "outraged" by her accusations. In 1993, writers revisited their connection via a series of competition wins. First Phyllis wins a dinner date from a magazine competition and Percy agrees to go on the date with her. Phyllis wins a poetry competition via a poem she writes about her love for Percy. Despite this, Percy is reluctant to begin a relationship with her. He show's his more caring side when he nurses her through an illness and sleeps beside her. In a 1996 plot, Phyllis' rival Maud Grimes (Elizabeth Bradley) reads her teacup and revealed the man of Phyllis' dreams was waiting for her. She responds by asking Percy to marry her, but he thinks Phyllis was pranking him and leaves abruptly. The two characters later move into the same retirement complex at Mayfield Court.

=== Departure ===
In 1993, Summers collapsed during a television appearance and in 1994, she had an operation on her pancreas. Producers decided to reduce her role within the show and Phyllis began to appear less frequently to accommodate her recovery. Summers also suffered pneumonia in 1995, further impacting her appearances in the role.

In 1996, producers reduced the role further as Summers continued to become ill. In October, Jimmy Hodge from Kent Evening Post referred to Summers as no longer playing Phyllis. In November, Summers' health continued to deteriorate. To facilitate her long-term absence from the role, writers created a story explaining that Phyllis had moved to sheltered accommodation. Phyllis did not appear again and Summers died on 11 January 1997. The show's creator Tony Warren paid tribute to Summers and described her as a "big attraction" during her time on the show. Phyllis made her final appearance during the episode broadcast on 1 May 1996. In the episode, Phyllis goes to the local salon to get her hair styled and converses with Maud about visiting her house.

== Reception ==
Summers regularly received fan mail from young viewers who told her that Phyllis is "funny" and how they wished Phyllis was their own grandmother. Attitude placed Phyllis eighth in their "top ten women of Coronation Street" feature. A critic branded her a "forgotten gem" of the show and described her as "the old lady with a purple rinse and a voice that sounded a little like a didgeridoo." They added that despite Phyllis being an "old lady" she was never portrayed as a "Emily Bishop-style sherry-sipper" because she drank Guinness and "her filthy Guinness breath was probably the main reason her love for Percy Sugden went unrequited for so many years." Martyn Hett from Manchester Evening News included her eleventh in their list of the fifteen top female characters of all time. Hett agreed she was a "forgotten gem" who "came from the golden age of the purple rinse". He added that Phyllis' "voice was so deep, she could easily have passed for Barry White." After Summers died, Helen Childs from Inside Soap assessed "Weatherfield will never quite be the same again" and "she made us laugh, she made us cry. We're going to miss Phyllis." Childs branded Phyllis "the best loved battleaxe in soap" and her jobs were "perfect for her to keep up with the Street's gossip". She added that Phyllis' "mission in life" was to romance Percy and "never gave up trying".

Heather Dixon from TV Guide branded Phyllis the "Sugden chasing", "crusty old manhunter" who became "the Street's veteran vamp". She added that "the tiny, elegantly-coiffured actress has made Phyllis one of the most colourful characters on the Street with her fruitless but determined pursuit of Percy." A writer from Express & Star described her as "the pushy, purple rinsed Phyllis, she gossiped with anyone and pursued the hapless Percy Sugden like an infatuated teenager, to no avail." Another reporter from the publication called Phyllis a "redoubtable" character. Jimmy Hodge from Kent Evening Post branded her "the pensioner who was always chasing Percy". The Evening Chronicle's Penfold branded Phyllis an "old battleaxe and man chaser".

Television writer Daran Little has described her as an "interfering battleaxe" type of character. Anthony Hayward, author of The Who's Who of Soap Operas described Phyllis as "of the blue-rinse hair do" and that "chasing fellow-pensioner Percy Sugden has become a full-time occupation" for her. Hayward added that Phyllis is "infatuated" with Percy and "wherever Percy goes, she is not likely to be far away." In her book, 60 Years of Coronation Street, Abigail Kemp opined "with her purple rinse and husky voice, pensioner Phyllis Pearce made a lasting impression on Coronation Street thanks to her amusing infatuation with pompous Percy." Kemp added that Phyllis is an "amorous lilac-haired" and a "poor old lovestruck" woman who Percy is "downright rude" to. Author Tim Randall branded Phyllis a "randy pensioner". He opined that Summers and Waddington played Phyllis and Percy's storyline to "peeved perfection". He described her as having a "voice like granite" that many viewers impersonated. A writer from the In Your Area application branded the character a "blue-rinse busybody". A BBC News reporter branded her the "blue-rinsed husky-voiced Phyllis Pearce". Stuart Heritage from The Guardian likened Christian Bale's performance as Batman to a "spot-on impression of gruff-voiced blue-haired" Phyllis. Dominic Knight from ATV Today believed that Mrs Mack (Gwyneth Guthrie) from Take the High Road had a voice lowered to levels "that could compete" with Phyllis, adding "she like her Corrie counterpart was steeped in gossip."
