= List of Coronation Street characters introduced in 1984 =

In 1984, several new characters made their debuts on Coronation Street, including Bill Webster and his daughter Debbie Webster.

== Debbie Webster ==
Debbie Webster
- Coronation Street character
- Portrayed by: Sue Devaney
- Duration: 1984–1985, 2019–2027
- First appearance: Episode 2420; 11 June 1984
- Introduced by: Mervyn Watson (1984); Iain MacLeod (2019)
- Crossover appearances: Corriedale (2026)
In-universe information
- Occupation: Café employee Hairdresser; Businesswoman
- Father: Bill Webster
- Mother: Alison Webster
- Stepmother: Elaine Prior; Maureen Holdsworth
- Brothers: Kevin Webster
- Husband: Ronnie Bailey (2026–present)
- Sons: Carl Webster
- Grandfathers: Jim Webster
- Grandmothers: Helen Webster
- Nephews: Jake Webster; Jack Webster
- Nieces: Rosie Webster; Sophie Webster

Debbie Webster, played by Sue Devaney, is the daughter of Bill Webster (Peter Armitage), and younger sister of Kevin Webster (Michael Le Vell). She made her first on screen appearance on 11 June 1984. Debbie left six months later on 9 January 1985. Devaney returned to the role in 2019 for five episodes, following a 34-year absence. On 28 July 2020, it was announced that Devaney would return again in 2020 on a permanent basis. In 2024, it was announced that Devaney had been axed and Debbie was set to eventually be killed-off in an emotional dementia storyline. However, it was later reported that the story was planned to run until at least 2027.

Debbie is Kevin's younger sister and arrives not long after her brother's arrival. After leaving school with no qualifications, Debbie worked at Jim's Café. She dates biker Daz Isherwood, much to her father's consternation. In January 1985, Debbie moves to Southampton with Bill and his new wife, Elaine Prior (Judy Gridley). Off-screen, Debbie trained as a hairdresser. In 2001, Kevin disappears when his then ex-wife Sally (Sally Dynevor) was planning to marry Danny Hargreaves and was found staying with Debbie in Southampton. Debbie was mentioned again in December 2009 when Kevin and Bill discuss Sally, now married to Kevin again and having treatment for breast cancer, the same disease that killed their mother Alison and how it affected them as children. The following year, after his daughter Sophie (Brooke Vincent) ran away from home with her girlfriend, Sian Powers (Sacha Parkinson). Kevin phoned Debbie and asked her if she had heard from Sophie. In September 2011, Debbie phones Rosie (Helen Flanagan) and tells her that she has bought a villa in Turkey and invites Kevin to visit and bring his baby son Jack. Kevin goes to visit Debbie in November 2016.

After more than 30 years away from Weatherfield, Debbie makes a return to visit Kevin. Within minutes, she and Abi Franklin (Sally Carman) cross wires until Kevin introduces Debbie as his sister. Debbie informs Kevin that their aunt, Vi has died and she attends the will reading. Debbie reveals that she is the sole beneficiary of their aunt's will and tells Kevin she has inherited £200,000 and plans to give it to him, which results in Kevin nearly choking in shock. Kevin then mulls over the idea.

In 2026, Chloe Timms from Inside Soap wrote that she "loved" Ronnie and Debbie together. For her role as Debbie, Devaney was longlisted for "Best Actress" at the 2026 Inside Soap Awards.

== Elaine Prior ==
Elaine Prior
- Coronation Street character
- Portrayed by: Judy Gridley (1984–1985); Unknown (2025)
- Duration: 1984–1985, 2025
- First appearance: 19 November 1984
- Last appearance: 9 January 1985; 10th December 2025 (voice appearance)
- Introduced by: Mervyn Watson
In-universe information
- Occupation: Hairdresser
- Father: Walter Prior
- Mother: Millie Prior
- Sisters: Frances Prior
- Husband: Bill Webster (1985–1996)
- Adoptive sons: Carl Webster
- Stepsons: Kevin Webster
- Stepdaughters: Debbie Webster
- Uncles: Percy Sugden

Elaine Prior (also Webster), played by Judy Gridley, is the niece of Percy Sugden (Bill Waddington), who hoped he could set her up with Mike Baldwin (Johnny Briggs), but instead begins dating Bill Webster (Peter Armitage) after they meet when Elaine cuts his daughter Debbie Webster (Sue Devaney)'s hair. Bill's son Kevin Webster (Michael Le Vell) also opposes their relationship as the Websters had only recently moved into Coronation Street. However, they subsequently move to Germany together and get married in 1985.

In 1986, Elaine and Bill have a son named Carl (Jonathan Howard). Elaine has an affair in 1994 with a foreman that Bill is working with, causing him to punch him and get fired from his job. Carl stayed with Elaine and Bill returned to Weatherfield in 1995. In December 2024, it was announced that Elaine's son, Carl would be introduced to the series sometime in 2025, 40 years after her departure. On 22 December 2025, Carl received a phone call informing him that Elaine had died of cancer. He regretted that she hadn’t told him she was ill and that he didn’t have the chance to say goodbye to her, unaware that she had tried to contact him via Debbie but she had forgotten.

== Dulcie Froggatt ==
Dulcie Froggatt
- Coronation Street character
- Portrayed by: Marji Campi
- Duration: 1984–1987
- First appearance: 12 December 1984
- Last appearance: 25 February 1987
- Introduced by: Mervyn Watson
In-universe information
- Husband: Ralph Froggatt

Dulcie Froggatt, played by Marji Campi, was a woman who Jack Duckworth (Bill Tarmey) cleaned windows for. Unbeknownst to his wife, Vera Duckworth (Liz Dawn), Jack and Dulcie began an affair, which continued for two years. After Dulcie's departure in 1987, she was not forgotten as their affair was revealed in 1994 when Jack made the papers for camping on Curly Watts (Kevin Kennedy)'s rooftop after one of his pigeons escapes Curly's observatory. Dulcie saw the article and told the papers that they had an affair, which also made the papers. Jack managed to hide the papers from Vera successfully, but she ended up seeing the article when she bought fish and chips wrapped up in them. Dulcie was mentioned again in 2010 when Jack joked about going to see her to Tyrone Dobbs (Alan Halsall) and his wife Molly (Vicky Binns).
