= Bill Webster =

Fictional character from Coronation Street

- Coronation Street character
- Portrayed by: Peter Armitage
- Duration: 1984–1985, 1995–1997, 2006–2011
- First appearance: 6 February 1984
- Last appearance: 29 December 2011
- Introduced by: Mervyn Watson (1984); Sue Pritchard (1995); Steve Frost (2006)
In-universe information
- Occupation: Builder
- Father: Jim Webster
- Mother: Helen Webster
- Wife: Alison Cartwright (backstory); Elaine Prior (1985–1996); Maureen Elliott (1998–2007)
- Sons: Kevin Webster
- Daughters: Debbie Webster
- Adoptive sons: Carl Webster
- Grandsons: Carl Webster; Jake Webster; Jack Webster
- Granddaughters: Rosie Webster; Sophie Webster

Bill Webster is a fictional character from the British ITV soap opera Coronation Street, played by Peter Armitage. The character first appeared onscreen during the episode airing on 6 February 1984 and remained in the show until 1985 when Armitage decided to leave. The character was reintroduced in 1995 but he was again written out two years later. Armitage returned once again in 2006 and appeared frequently until late-April 2010 when the character suddenly appeared only on a recurring basis. It was reported in 2011 that Bill was going to be axed completely, however, he continued to make appearances on a recurring basis. His last appearance was broadcast on 29 December 2011, where Bill was in attendance at youngest granddaughter Sophie's wedding to her fiancée Sian Powers. Armitage died on 30 November 2018, therefore ruling out a future return for the character. The character was killed off-screen in April 2023.

Bill is the father of Kevin Webster (Michael Le Vell), his sister Debbie (Sue Devaney) and another son, Carl Webster (Jonathan Howard), from his marriage to Elaine Prior. He is grandfather to Rosie (Helen Flanagan), Sophie (Brooke Vincent) and Jack Webster (Kyran Bowes).

== Creation and casting ==
Prior to playing Bill, Armitage had previously appeared on Coronation Street in 1977 playing a minor role as a painter and decorator, working on a job at the Rovers Return. In between jobs, Armitage starred in an advertisement for the Yellow Pages in which he played the role of a father. After watching the advert, the serial's producer H. V. Kershaw decided that Armitage would be right for a role in Coronation Street and contacted his agent. Armitage was interviewed for the job by Bill Podmore, who informed him that they were looking to introduce new characters. Armitage was under the impression that he would be playing a guest character, but Podmore then offered him a one-year contract. He said that he could not believe that he won the role because he had never imagined himself being "a Coronation Street actor". Armitage was also unaware that it was Kershaw's involvement in his casting, until Kershaw informed the actor some months later.

== Character development ==
Armitage told a reporter from the serial's official website that Bill is a "good bloke" who would not harm anyone. Bill is the type of man who "knows everybody" and speaks to everyone. He said that some people walk down the streets with their heads to the floor, but Bill is the opposite and always ready for conversation. Bill can sometimes be awkward, angry and has a "short fuse". Armitage explained that quiet, ordinary blokes like Bill "don't make a lot of fuss" until they become angered. Even though Bill is "a simple guy" he is not unintelligent and has a knack for seeing people's true colours. Armitage also described his character as "indomitable" because of his optimistic nature. When things get tough he "keeps firing on" and thinks "things can only get better, deal with it and get on with your life."

Bill was introduced during the episode airing on 6 February 1984. He arrives to fix a leaking roof at Brian Tilsley's (Christopher Quinten) garage. Bill was initially paired with Linda Cheveski (Anne Cunningham) – an original character who was reintroduced into Coronation Street. She wanted to find a new man and regain her mothers old house, which Bill wanted to buy. However, producers felt that Armitage and Cunningham were not suited to one another and Linda was quickly written out of the serial. Bill and his son Kevin Webster (Michael Le Vell) often argued during their early appearances. Their rows became so bad that other residents dubbed them the "warring Websters". Armitage told Richard Arnold from Inside Soap that he had "great scenes" in which Bill and Kevin almost "came to blows". They became so frequent that by the time Bill departed the serial; his relationship with Kevin was "very strained". Although the pair did decide to make amends. In his book titled Coronation Street; Jack Tinker said that Bill was written out of the series because Armitage had not "settled in the role". However – Kevin remained in the series because he had made a "considerable impact" on storylines and viewers. Bill's exit storyline consisted of him, Elaine Prior (Judy Gridley) and daughter Debbie Webster (Sue Devaney) moving to Southampton.

When Armitage departed he knew that there was a possibility of a future return. Armitage returned to filming in 1995 after Granada got into contact with him with an offer. The actor told a columnist for The official magazine of Coronation Street that he had not thought about returning because ten years had passed since his previous appearance. He added that Bill originally moved to Southampton with his family and then to Germany, he secured a job as a "chippie" and fathered a son named Carl (Jonathan Howard). Armitage revealed that Bill returns to Weatherfield after splitting up with Elaine and he is "on a big downer" and needs time away from the situation. Bill had not lived alone before, Armitage said that this was because Bill is "the type of guy who needs people around him". Bill visits his granddaughters because he has never had a role in their lives, and he hinted that there would be something that makes Bill prolong his stay.

Armitage told Inside Soap's Arnold that he had worried that Bill might have been away for too long. Although, he soon realised that many families become estranged and thought it fitted in with Bill's 1985 departure. Armitage explained that "the way things were left has a lot to do with why they haven't seen each other for so long." Bill was in a situation where he had wanted to visit, but before he knew it "the years have flown by", but Kevin is pleased to see his father. Armitage defended Bill's absence to a reporter from What's on TV, stating "you know what it's like. As time goes by, you find it harder to make contact; too much water has passed under the bridge." The actor hoped that the Webster's story would prompt viewers who were out of contact with their families to reconnect with them. However, the storyline soon revisits the father and son rift when Kevin tires of his father. Armitage said that Kevin wishes his father never returned because "the more he tries to help his son, the more trouble he causes".

In 1997, Armitage was axed by series producer Brian Park who had written out many characters as part a revamp of Coronation Street. Park told Jan Disley and John Millar from the Daily Record that it was a tough decision but he had to consider the future of the serial. Armitage said that Bill was one of the best parts he had ever played and admitted that he had a "touch of sadness" about departing. Sherrie Hewson who plays Maureen Holdsworth was also axed by Park. Bill and Maureen were written out of Coronation Street in a shared storyline; which saw the pair running away to be together, soon after she had married Fred Elliott (John Savident). A spokesperson from the serial told the Daily Mirror's Paul Byrne that Maureen knows that marrying Fred was the wrong choice and she sets her sights on Bill once again. Hewson was unhappy with Bill and Maureen's affair because she did not think it was convincing. While interviewed by John Millar from the Daily Record, the actress stated: "I voiced my opinion nine months earlier. I just knew that it felt wrong and uncomfortable. Bill might have mended Maureen's pipes, but she wouldn't have had an affair with him."

Armitage returned to the series in 2006. Kris Green from Digital Spy reported that his fellow cast members were enjoying the opportunity to work with Armitage again. Bill starts an affair with Audrey Roberts (Sue Nicholls) while married to Maureen. Producers decided to bring Hewson back as Maureen for the serial's 2006 Christmas episode. Brian Roberts from the Daily Mirror reported that when Maureen arrives, she has not realised that Bill is cheating on her with Audrey. A Coronation Street representative told Roberts that it would be a "memorable entrance" when the character's Christmas dinner descends into chaos. Hewson told Graham Young of the Coventry Evening Telegraph that her character does not expect any problems in her arrival. Maureen "thinks she's going to the heart of her family [...] and suddenly it all turns very nasty indeed." Hewson thought that the scenes in which Maureen discovers Bill's infidelity were both "funny and tragic".

In April 2009 Green reported that Gabrielle Drake had been cast to play Vanessa; a character who would become involved in Bill's storyline. Green revealed that Bill and Pam Hobsworth (Kate Anthony) attend a singles night and Bill wants to impress posh Vanessa. A spokesperson from Coronation Street said that it was a "funny storyline which sees Vanessa and her partner eyeing up Bill and Pam when they meet in a hotel."

On 5 June 2011, Tom Latchem from the News of the World reported that Bill had been axed for the third time by series producer Phil Collinson. Armitage had requested a meeting with Collinson to discuss his character's future. However, the actor was then informed that they were writing Bill out. On 31 July 2011, Will Payne from the Daily Mirror announced that Bill would make a return to the series in September after Collinson had a "change of heart". Bill arrives back in Weatherfield with Pam and the reveal their intention to marry. However, Payne reported that Bill would collapse and leave his future uncertain. In 2014, Armitage stated that he wanted to return to the show. On 30 November 2018, Armitage died from a Heart Attack aged 79, ending the possibility of him returning as Bill. The character was killed off-screen in April 2023.

== Storylines ==
On 6 February 1984, Bill first appears when he comes to look at Brian Tilsley's (Christopher Quinten) garage roof, which is leaking. Bill buys No.11 from Linda, who is acting on behalf of her mother, Elsie Tanner (Pat Phoenix) and rents Len Fairclough's (Peter Adamson) builder's yard from his wife Rita (Barbara Knox), and they become very friendly.

Bill's first wife, Alison, died of cancer in June 1980. However, it is Percy Sugden's (Bill Waddington) niece, Elaine Prior, whom Bill falls for, and in January 1985 they marry and move to Southampton with Bill's daughter, Debbie, where Elaine opens a hair salon. Elaine later gives birth to Bill's second son, Carl. Sometime after this Bill and Elaine move to Germany, where Elaine has an affair, and in July 1995, Bill realises their marriage is over, and returns to Weatherfield and turns up on Kevin's doorstep. Bill moves in with Kevin while Kevin's wife, Sally (Sally Dynevor), whom he has never met, is away. To welcome his daughter-in-law home, he cooks a meal and burns down their kitchen in the process. Fortunately, he uses his building skills to repair the damage. Bill gets a job as cellarman at The Rovers Return, and later moves in there. In November 1995, Bill loses his job at The Rovers when the Duckworths take over, and to make things worse, receives a tax bill for £1,400. He cannot afford to pay, so Kevin and Sally lend him the money – much to the annoyance of Rita who had given the Webster children £5,000. Mike Baldwin (Johnny Briggs) asks Bill to do some work at the Crimea Street flats and gets one of the flats in return and Jim McDonald (Charles Lawson) becomes his business partner. In 1997, Bill has an affair with Maureen and the pair run away together to Germany just ten days after Maureen has married Fred.

He appears again on 15 October 2006 when Kevin, Sally, Rosie, Rosie's boyfriend Craig Harris (Richard Fleeshman) and Sophie go for a weekend in Paris. He returns to visit his family shortly after and begins romancing Audrey. Bill returns again at Christmas 2006 and carries on his relationship with Audrey. However, Maureen arrives on Christmas Day, while Bill and Audrey are having dinner at the Platts' and Audrey's grandson David Platt (Jack P. Shepherd) reveals Bill and Audrey's relationship to a devastated Maureen. After Christmas, Bill and Maureen return to Germany to talk through their problems. Several weeks later, Bill returns, confirming that his marriage is over and moves in with Audrey, after working with Jason Grimshaw (Ryan Thomas) on the new take-away. Bill announces his plans to buy "Stubbs Building Yard", after the murder of owner Charlie Stubbs (Bill Ward). Audrey puts up the money for the venture and the offer is accepted in April 2007. Bill goes on to hire David but later fires him, feeling that he is too much of a liability. Audrey and Bill split up in August 2008, following a disastrous trip to France with Janice Battersby (Vicky Entwistle) and Roger Stiles (Andrew Dunn). In March 2009, Audrey tells Bill that she needs him to repay the loan she gave him and as business is insufficient, he is forced to employ Jason on a job-by-job basis.

In June 2009, Bill meets a woman called Vanessa at a singles night and claims he is an ex-soldier called Newton. He soon gets bored of Vanessa and meets neighbour Pam who is having equally bad luck. The two lose their respective dates during the next few days and begin to write personal ads. They soon realise that they are a compatible match and begin dating. In December 2009, Kevin tells Bill that Sally has breast cancer, and Bill is sympathetic and wants to support him, as Bill's first wife, Alison (Kevin and Debbie's mother) also died from breast cancer. However, Kevin later admits to Bill that he has been having a sexual affair with Pam's niece, Molly Dobbs (Vicky Binns). Bill is disgusted and urges him to stand by Sally and forget about Molly. Facing increasing pressure from rival builder Owen Armstrong (Ian Puleston-Davies), who wins the contract to rebuild Underworld, plus the credit crunch, Bill agrees to sell the building yard to Owen in August 2010. Since his retirement, Bill's appearances on the Street became less frequent. When Molly is killed in the tram crash in December 2010, Bill cannot face attending her funeral as he knows the truth about Kevin being the father of Molly's son and is angry with Kevin for comforting Tyrone and acting like his friend. This makes Tyrone suspicious and leads to him and Kevin arguing after the funeral when he realises that Bill knew about the affair and Jack's paternity. Bill tries to reason with Tyrone and apologises for Kevin's actions but Tyrone furiously throws him out. In April 2011, Kevin meets Bill in The Rovers and tells him that Sally wanted half of the money he won on a lottery scratch card and that he had won the legal battle to keep it. Kevin tells Bill that he feels guilty for winning the money and that Sally thinks he is greedy. Bill tells Kevin to prove Sally wrong so he gives her the money. Bill and Pam later go travelling.

In September 2011, Bill returns with Pam and announce their plans to marry. After Pam tells Kevin he is not invited, this causes an argument and Bill suffers a heart attack and is rushed into the hospital. He recovers but Pam stuck by what she said and refuses to allow Kevin to attend the wedding. Bill is last seen attending Sophie and Sian's ill-fated wedding. In April 2013, Kevin travels to Germany to care for Bill after he suffers another, more serious heart attack while over there. It is not known whether Bill and Pam got married.

In March 2023, Kevin and Debbie receive news that Bill has taken ill and is in hospital and they travel to Germany. The following month, Bill dies.

== Reception ==
On the What's on TV website Bill is described as a man who "likes to have his cake and eat it, especially where women are concerned". Tracey MacLeod from The Independent said that Bill was a boring "non-character" with "no discernible personality". Dek Hogan from Digital Spy said that "disturbingly, Audrey is getting very flirtatious with Bill Webster, having recently assisted Fred to an early grave via her womanly wiles." Hogan jested that Bill should have remained cautious in case he was next in line for an early death. Brian Roberts from the Sunday Mirror wrote that Bill and Jim became "a real pair of likely lads" when they moved in together.
