= Jill Summers =

English music hall performer (1910–1997)

- Born: Honor Margaret Rozelle Santoi Fuller; 8 December 1910; Eccles, Lancashire, England
- Died: 11 January 1997 (aged 86); Salford, Greater Manchester, England
- Years active: 1917–1996
- Spouses: John Arthur Hunt (m. 1928; died 1948) Clifford Simpson Smith (m. 1949; died 1984)

Jill Summers (born Honor Margaret Rozelle Santoi Fuller; 8 December 1910 – 11 January 1997) was an English music hall performer, actress and comedian. Her career in entertainment lasted eighty years and in 1982 she achieved stardom as Phyllis Pearce, in Granada Television's long-running soap opera Coronation Street. She made her last appearance in May 1996, and died eight months later.

== Early life ==
Summers was born in Eccles, Lancashire, one of four sisters and a brother, to father Alf Rozelle, a circus tightrope walker, and mother Mary Fuller (stage name Marie Santoi), a famous revue artist. Born into a theatrical family, her grandmother was a well-known bare-back rider, and her uncle, Johnny Fuller, known as "The Famous Cat", frequently acted alongside Fay Compton in the pantomime Dick Whittington.

== Career ==
She first performed on stage aged six. Her childhood was mostly unhappy, with her touring parents often leaving her with foster families. When Summers was 13, her mother died, and she went to work in a cotton mill.

Summers formed a musical comedy double act with her half-brother, Tom F. Moss, during which time she performed at nearly every theatre in Britain. Her half-brother was the son of Summers' mother and Tom Major-Ball. Major-Ball later went on to marry Gwen Coates, and they had three children, one of whom, John, became British Prime Minister in 1990. In her early twenties, Summers damaged her vocal cords by reaching for a high note one night, cracking her voice, and by the end of the turn she was left with her distinctive gravelly voice.

By 1939, she had left the stage to take up hairdressing and ran a combined hairdresser's and newsagent's with her first husband. During World War II, she entertained troops as part of ENSA, and was known as Lancashire Comedienne Jill Summers, the Pin-Up Girl of British Railways. Born Honor Fuller, her stage name was derived from her favourite measurement of alcohol, a gill, and her favourite time of year, summer, and when asked by an agent, her reply was "Jill Summers, the gill of a Summer's Day." Most of her variety material was written by her second husband, Dr Clifford Simpson Smith, including three of her best known sketches, "The Landlady", "The Bartered Bride" and "The Lady Porteress". She became a comedian when she tripped up on stage and swore, which the audience lapped up. Her act, "The Pipes of Pan", made her famous in London and the provinces. In the 1940s and 1950s, she frequently topped the bill as a singer on the then-powerful Moss Empires circuit.

By 1949, her double act with Moss had split up when she discovered her half-brother had been keeping the bulk of the salary for himself. Summers continued solo, appearing alongside the top acts of the day. Her second husband, who she met in 1948, took over the management of her career and toured with her. By the 1960s, with theatres starting to close and variety acts falling out of fashion, Summers reinvented herself, and alongside her television work, launched on the club scene with an act featuring songs and comedy. It was said that the act often included "some very blue material". Amongst Summers' possessions were "a whole file of complaint letters from working men's clubs." The complaints were generally that she was too rude for the working men.

In 1957 she landed her big break with her own television series, Summers Here, which featured a different star guest each week, such as Wilfrid Hyde White, Michael Bentine and Terence Alexander. As an actress, Summers' first television acting role was in 1969 in Kevin Laffan's twice-weekly Yorkshire TV soap Castle Haven, playing pub landlady Delilah Hilldrup. She also appeared in How We Used To Live, Stay With Me Till Morning, This Year, Next Year and an Alan Bennett Play For Today entitled Sunset Across The Bay.

Her first brief appearance in Coronation Street was in 1972, playing Bessie Proctor, a cleaner working with Hilda Ogden. A decade later, in 1982, Summers reappeared as Phyllis Pearce, a blue rinsed pensioner, forever lusting after pompous ex-serviceman Percy Sugden. It was during her second stint in Coronation Street that she was reunited with Bill Waddington and Tom Mennard, two old friends from her music hall days. In 1994, she collapsed with angina on the set of This Is Your Life, when host Michael Aspel handed her the famous red book. Although her health continued to deteriorate through the 1990s, suffering from a heart condition and worsening angina, she refused to allow Phyllis to be written out. She continued to make increasingly occasional appearances, last appearing in the spring of 1996, after more than 500 episodes.

Other appearances by Summers include Agatha (alongside Dustin Hoffman and Vanessa Redgrave), Sez Lez (with Les Dawson), Ready When You Are, Mr McGill, and performing a Victoria Wood scripted monologue in 1982's Wood and Walters, as well as appearing in Wood's TV play Nearly A Happy Ending.

== Personal life and death ==
Aged 17, Summers married her first husband, John Arthur Hunt, who was 20 years her senior, in Bucklow, Cheshire, in 1928. They ran a combined hairdressers and newsagents in Sale, Cheshire. Hunt died aged 57 in November 1948, leaving Summers widowed at the age of 37.

The following year, Summers met surgeon Clifford Simpson Smith, who was in a theatre box in a Black Country venue, where she told a joke about seeing many a rotten egg in a box. They met after the show, and were married shortly afterwards in Stourbridge, Worcestershire. The couple remained wed until Smith's death in June 1984. They had no children, but Summers was stepmother to Smith's son, Stuart Turner. She lived in Ossett, West Yorkshire.

In January 1997, Summers died in her sleep at Oaklands Hospital, Manchester, of kidney failure. Summer's last words in hospital raised a smile. A nurse offered her a drink: "A cup of tea, milk or a glass of water...?" Very dryly, she replied: "It gets better all the time." Summers died seconds later.

In their autobiographies, released in different years, former Coronation Street stars Jean Alexander, Bill Waddington, Lynne Perrie, Julie Goodyear and Amanda Barrie described Summers as a true professional actress who was witty, hilarious and outspokenly funny. Summers was a member of The Grand Order of Lady Ratlings, a charitable organisation for women in show business.

== Filmography ==
Year	Title	Role	Notes
1946	What Do We Do Now?	Birdie Maudlin	
1979	Agatha	Nancy's Aunt	
