= Sue Devaney =

English actress (born 1967)

- Born: Susan Barber; 2 July 1967 (age 59); Ashton-under-Lyne, Lancashire, England
- Occupation: Actress
- Years active: 1983–present
- Known for: Coronation Street; Jonny Briggs; Casualty; Dinnerladies
- Spouse: Jim O'Farrell (m. 2024)

Sue Devaney (born Susan Barber; 2 July 1967) is an English actress. Her roles include Debbie Webster in Coronation Street, Rita in Jonny Briggs, Liz Harker in Casualty and Jane in Dinnerladies.

== Career ==
Devaney has played various roles on British television including; Debbie Webster in Coronation Street (1984–1985, 2019–present), Rita Briggs in Jonny Briggs (1985–1987), Liz Harker in Casualty (1994–1997), and Jane in Dinnerladies (1998–2000). In the early 1990s she appeared in a commercial for the Gateway supermarket chain (later Somerfield). In 2009, she played the role of Peggy in the Channel 4 drama Shameless, and lent her voice to the role of Jane in Carol Donaldson's BBC Radio 4 play Normal and Nat. Devaney performed at the Marlowe Theatre, Canterbury as the Fairy Godmother in Cinderella, Friday 2 December 2011 – Sunday 22 January 2012. In 2013, she appeared in the ITV comedy-drama series Great Night Out as Linda, and played Carmel in the BBC comedy drama Being Eileen. In April 2013, she appeared in the BBC Scotland produced Glasgow-based soap River City.

On stage, she has appeared in numerous productions, including A Taste of Honey, Beggars Opera, The Wizard of Oz, Love's Labours Lost, When We Are Married, The Wind in the Willows and The Land of the Living. In 2014, she starred as Rosie in the musical Mamma Mia! for a 10-week summer season at the Blackpool Opera House, in the Winter Gardens from 20 June to 31 August.

== Filmography ==
Television appearances
Year	Title	Character	Notes
1983	In Loving Memory	Mildred	Episode: "Trouble at T' Mill"
1984–1985, 2019–Present	Coronation Street	Debbie Webster	Series regular
1985–1987	Jonny Briggs	Rita	Main role; 28 episodes
1987	First Sight	Amanda	Episode: "Exclusive Yarns"
1987	Rainbow	Camper	Episode: "Co-Operation"
1989	Flying Lady	Sandra	Episode: "An Arm and a Leg"
1989	The Real Eddy English	Mad Bastard	Main role; 4 episodes
1989	About Face	Betsy	Episode: "Mrs Worthington's Daughter"
1990	Haggard	Betty Bouncer	2 episodes
1990	Spatz	Jo	Main role; 10 episodes
1991	Gordon the Gopher	Zoe	Series 1: Episode 1
1993	The Bill	Ruth Harcourt	Episode: "Persuasion"
1993	Heartbeat	Jennifer Galvin	Episode: "Bang to Rights"
1994	Model Millie	Trendy Wendy	
1994–1997	Casualty	Liz Harker	Series regular; 74 episodes
1997	Common As Muck	Helen	2 episodes
1998	The Mrs Bradley Mysteries	Mabel Jones	Episode: "Speedy Death"
1998–2000	Dinnerladies	Jane	Supporting role; 11 episodes
2001, 2004, 2018	Doctors	Alison Darling; Jenny Groves; Jan Miller	3 episodes
2002	Being April	Angela	Episode: "Normal"
2004	The Royal	Daisy Douglas	Episode: "All the Fun of the Fair"
2006	Strictly Confidential	Lorraine	Series 1: Episode 4
2008	The Royal Today	Alison Alexander	Series 1: Episode 5
2009, 2013	Shameless	Peggy; Mindy	2 episodes
2012	Emmerdale	Midwife	1 episode
2013	Great Night Out	Linda	2 episodes
2013	Being Eileen	Carmel	Episode: "DIY"
2013	River City	Angela	Series 10: Episode 2
2019	Years and Years	Barbara Hopkins	Series 1: Episode 3
TBA	Made in the Eighties	Anna	Currently in post-production
