= Tom Mennard =

English comedian and actor (1918–1989)

Tom Mennard (11 February 1918 – 2 November 1989) was an English comedian and actor. He had a long career in variety, radio and television.

== Life and career ==
Mennard was born in Beeston, Leeds, the son of an undertaker. He subsequently settled in Brighton where he worked as bus driver. Whilst in Brighton, he became involved in an amateur revue company where his performances attracted the attention of singer Donald Peers, who was appearing in variety in the town. On Peers' recommendation, Mennard got an audition for the BBC and as a result was given a spot on The Centre Show, a television programme for new talent presented by Benny Hill.

Following Hill's advice, he auditioned for the Windmill Theatre in London and, after two rejections, was accepted with a routine in which he played a road sweeper. His first appearances at the theatre were alongside Bill Waddington and Jill Summers. Variety and theatre work followed, including a tour with Harold Fielding's Music for the Millions during which Mennard worked with his idol Robb Wilton, whose slow, deliberate style of story-telling was the main influence on Mennard's own delivery style. He also made several appearances on BBC TV's long-running variety programme, The Good Old Days, at The City Varieties Theatre in Leeds, his home town.

Mennard became a regular feature on Mike Craig's radio shows in Manchester and these helped him to reach a wider national audience. His radio work included his own show, Local Tales. He also managed a handful of film appearances, including the horror The Flesh and Blood Show and the sexploitation film Four Dimensions of Greta.

His television appearances include Dad's Army, Open All Hours, Bergerac and the Harry Worth vehicle Oh Happy Band!. In 1985, he joined the cast of Coronation Street in the role of Sam Tindall, remaining in the part irregularly until 1989, with his real life dog Dougal also featuring as the character's pet.

== Death ==
Mennard died from cancer in 1989 at Salisbury hospital, aged 71.
