= Bill Waddington =

English actor, comedian and variety performer

- Waddington as Percy Sugden in Coronation Street
- Born: William Joseph Waddington; 10 June 1916; Oldham, Lancashire, England
- Died: 9 September 2000 (aged 84); Rotherham, South Yorkshire, England
- Resting place: St Peter's Church, Minshull Vernon, Cheshire, England
- Years active: c.late 1930s–1999
- Spouse(s): Evelyn Case (m. 1940; div. 1947) Lilian Day (m. 1947; died 1980) Irene Beaumont (m. 1982; div. 1982) Sheila Torr (m. 1995)
- Children: 3

William Joseph Waddington (10 June 1916 – 9 September 2000) was an English actor, comedian and co-author who was born in Oldham, Lancashire. In later life he achieved stardom as the pompous ex-serviceman Percy Sugden in Granada Television's long-running soap opera Coronation Street.

== Biography ==
Bill Waddington was born on 10 June 1916 in Oldham, Lancashire. His parents William and Epsie ran the Clarence Hotel, a public house in Oldham. He was the couple's fourth child, having lost twins the year before. Waddington, and his sister Connie, were brought up by family friends as their father fought in the First World War, and their mother worked all hours to keep the children fed. The family moved house frequently and Waddington attended many different schools in Oldham. It was at school he took to the stage, and during one performance he was spotted by the choirmaster of the Oldham parish church, and persuaded to join. However, he was expelled from the choir for stealing two bananas from the harvest festival display. Having been expelled from his first school for being unruly, he finished his education, age 14, at grammar school being described as "the clown for the class".

Away from the stage, he developed a career as a butcher, and worked delivering meat for a chain of shops before being promoted to manager of the local branch. At the age of eighteen, he began travelling to Blackpool to see his favourite stars on stage, and started to have thoughts of becoming a performer. His mother was less supportive, and Waddington had a series of jobs as a manager of a butchers in Blackpool, a door-to-door salesman, and a car salesman.

Inspired by George Formby, Waddington played the ukulele and his talent as a comedian was spotted when he was an NCO cook in the army during the Second World War. He became a member of a group called the Blue Pencils, recruited to entertain forces during the War. He won the Normandy medal and Liberation of France medal.

After the war, Waddington became a comedian, often appearing on the same bill as Jill Summers, who would eventually play Phyllis Pearce, Percy Sugden's foil in Granada TV's Coronation Street. In 1955, Bill was chosen for the Royal Variety Performance, and when American stars such as Frankie Laine, Lena Horne, Billy Daniels and Dorothy Lamour toured Britain he was the opening comedian in their shows. His agent was Lew Grade. In his first pantomime, he met actress Lilian Day whom he would later marry.

Waddington appeared in more than 800 variety and comedy programmes on radio, and made his mark on television, starring with Margaret Lockwood as early as 1946. In the 1970s, he enjoyed a stage partnership with Sid James, only ended by James' death in 1976.

In 1975, Waddington played Harry in one episode of the sitcom How's Your Father?, written by Coronation Street writer John Stevenson. He appeared as a magician in Victoria Wood's first play Talent for Granada Television in 1979.

Between 1967-80, Waddington played four roles in Coronation Street. His first two parts were uncredited as a man with a pipe in a cafe scene in 1967 and a drunken businessman who laughed at one of Stan Ogden's jokes in 1974. He also appeared as Eric Summers, Rita Sullivan's theatrical manager, in 1978 and George Turner, best man at the wedding of Emily Bishop and bigamist Arnold Swain, in 1980.

Two years into retirement, aged 67, Waddington played his best-known role of cantankerous pensioner Percy Sugden in Coronation Street from August 1983 until quitting the serial in October 1997, because the soap had become too raunchy. He resisted attempts by writers to kill the character off, instead leaving the street to live out the rest of his days at Mayfield Court; a retirement home. Waddington did not audition for the role of Percy Sugden as it was created for him, with the writers aware of his comedy roles.

In one autobiography, Waddington admitted that he and Sugden had a lot in common. Sugden forever compared the problems of today with the good old days of the war: "When you've prepared spotted dick and custard for 150 under heavy artillery fire, you can do anything," was one of his characters more memorable lines. It was in this role he was reunited with old friends from music hall days such as: Betty Driver, Jill Summers and Tom Mennard. By the time Waddington left Coronation Street there were five Percy Sugden Appreciation Societies, including one at Cambridge University.

He was the subject of This Is Your Life in September 1986 when he was surprised by Eamonn Andrews and Joe Loss with his orchestra at London's Euston station. In 1989, along with the rest of the Coronation Street cast, Waddington made a second Royal Variety Performance appearance. He also wrote two books, an autobiography, 'The Importance of Being Percy' in 1992, and a tie in with the 50th anniversary of the D-Day landings, 'Percy's War' in 1994.

After leaving Coronation Street in 1997, Waddington retired from full-time acting, with his last television appearance in a Little Chef TV advert.

== Music ==
In 1995, he released a cover of "Always Look on the Bright Side of Life" along with the rest of the Coronation Street cast, the single reaching No. 35 on the UK Singles Chart. He had previously released his own single "Don't Forget the Old Folks at Christmas" in 1986 but this failed to chart.

== Personal life and death ==
In 1940, Waddington married Evelyn Gladys Case. They had a son but divorced in 1947. Waddington's second marriage was in 1947 to Lilian Day. They had two daughters, Denise and Barbara, remaining together until her death from cancer in 1980.

In 1982, Waddington married Irene Beaumont. However, the marriage ended in divorce after only 9 months. Waddington married Sheila Torr, sister of comic duos The Chuckle Brothers and The Patton Brothers and almost 20 years his junior, in 1995, and the couple lived in a 17th Century farmhouse high on the Pennine Moors, in the nearby village of Micklebring, near Rotherham. He had over 2000 pigs, turkeys and several race horses.

Waddington became increasingly frail, and spent his final months at a nursing home in Maltby, South Yorkshire, where his wife visited him daily. Bill Waddington died at Rotherham General Hospital on the morning of 9 September 2000 at the age of 84 after a fifty-year acting career. He had been suffering from Parkinson's disease and was buried at St. Peter's graveyard at Minshull Vernon, near Crewe.

== TV credits ==
- A Family at War (1970) - Ted Fiddler
- Talent (1979) - George Findley
- Coronation Street (1967–1997) - Percy Sugden / George Turner / Eric Summers / Jack / Man with Pipe

== Bibliography ==
- The Importance of Being Percy by Bill Waddington and Stafford Hildred. (ISBN 1852831928), an autobiography written in 1992.
- Percy's War by Stafford Hildred. (ISBN 189892600X), the D-Day memories of Coronation Street's Bill Waddington published in 1994.
