= Peter Armitage (actor) =

English actor (1939–2018)

Peter Armitage MBE
- Born: Peter James Armitage; 23 October 1939; Skipton, West Riding of Yorkshire, England
- Died: 30 November 2018 (aged 79); Cononley, North Yorkshire, England
- Education: East 15 Acting School
- Occupation: Actor
- Years active: 1969–2018
- Spouse: Annabel Scase (m. 1970, divorced)
- Children: 2

Peter James Armitage (23 October 1939 – 30 November 2018) was an English television and stage actor best known for his role as Bill Webster on long-running soap opera Coronation Street. He was a regular on British screens from the 1970s onwards.

== Early life ==
Armitage was born out of wedlock in Skipton, West Riding of Yorkshire, where he was brought up primarily by his aunt until the age of 10, when his mother married. He did not meet his father, who was German, until he was 28, and the two did not form a long-term relationship. Armitage attended Glusburn secondary modern school, then was apprenticed to a firm building diesel engines for five years. He subsequently spent four years serving in the Merchant Navy before settling in London, where he worked as a banksman on the construction of the Victoria line. He then enrolled at the East 15 Acting School in Loughton, Essex to train as an actor.

== Career ==
Armitage had three spells as the character Bill Webster on Coronation Street, appearing in the role in 1984–1985 (for six months), then from 1995 to 1997 and again from 2006 to 2011. He had previously appeared as a different character playing a painter and decorator in two episodes in 1977. In 2014 Armitage stated in an interview that he had hoped to return to the series after successfully battling bowel cancer.

In the 1970s Armitage appeared in two British drama series, The Sweeney and The Professionals. In The Sweeney Armitage appeared as Herbert "Jacko" Jackson in the episode Big Spender. His character was that of a crooked ticket attendant of a car park company who becomes involved with an organized crime family in and attempt to defraud his employers. Whilst in The Professionals Armitage appeared as Special Branch detective Ray Kerrigan, the episode entitled Stake Out.

In 1988, a century after the Whitechapel Murders, Armitage appeared in the television mini-series Jack the Ripper in which he played the part of Sergeant Kirby.

His other TV credits include Lovejoy, The Befrienders, Couples and Hearts and Minds. He also appeared in Lucky Feller, a short-lived sitcom starring David Jason. In 1998, played Danny Ormondroyd in a stage adaptation of the film Brassed Off at the Sheffield Crucible and London’s Olivier Theatre.

== Personal life ==
Armitage married actress Annabel Scase in 1970; the couple had two children, Daniel and Sally, and later divorced.

Armitage lived in Cross Hills, North Yorkshire and subsequently in Cononley near Skipton. He was appointed a Member of the Order of the British Empire (MBE) in the 2011 Birthday Honours for services to amateur theatre in Yorkshire.

Armitage died of a heart attack on 30 November 2018, aged 79. He was survived by his children.
