= Darryl Morton =

Fictional character from Coronation Street

- Coronation Street character
- Portrayed by: Jonathan Dixon
- Duration: 2007–2009
- First appearance: 18 March 2007
- Last appearance: 16 October 2009
- Introduced by: Steve Frost
In-universe information
- Occupation: Takeaway worker
- Father: Jerry Morton
- Mother: Teresa Bryant
- Sisters: Jodie Morton; Mel Morton; Kayleigh Morton
- Half-brothers: Finlay Byrant
- Grandfathers: Wilf Morton

Darryl Morton is a fictional character from the British ITV soap opera Coronation Street. Portrayed by former Grange Hill actor Jonathan Dixon, the character first appeared onscreen during the episode airing on 18 March 2007.

== Creation ==
=== Background ===
Darryl is the less serious-minded of the Morton twins, Darryl can be just plain daft, lazy and is closest to his twin sister Mel. In the interview with Digital Spy, Dixon went on to confirm this, speaking of his character he said:

I don't think he's really that snidey and dark. Just your classic teenage lazy boy... He's mainly close to Mel, his twin sister, they're very close, as much as they do get down each others' necks

Darryl first appears on-screen 18 March 2007. He lives in the shed of the garden of Number 6. He gets into trouble with the law for several motoring offences, and is horrified when twin sister Mel (Emma Edmondson) says that she plans to join the police. Soon after his arrival he strikes up a close friendship with next door neighbour David Platt (Jack P. Shepherd, coincidentally his real life childhood friend).

=== Casting ===
During the casting for the character of Darryl, different actors were called in for auditions for the role. Dixon revealed in an interview with Digital Spy that he was called back through five stages of auditioning and eventually got down to the last two where he had to audition against a long-term friend. During each stage of auditioning the hopefuls had to audition as sets of twins. Jonathan continually met Edmondson. In the final audition the two were paired up, and went on to be cast as twins Mel and Darryl. It also emerged that the actor is real life friend of fellow cast member Shepherd who plays David in the show.

In August 2008, it was thought the character Darryl would exit the street in November, two months after the rest of the Morton family. However, he signed a new 6-month contract. It was reported on 15 May 2009 that Dixon and co-star Wanda Opalinska would be written out of the soap and would be departing later in the year with it being said that this was due to "natural storyline progression."

== Storylines ==
Darryl Morton arrives in Coronation Street with his father Jerry (Michael Starke), grandfather Wilf (Rodney Litchfield), and sisters, Jodie (Samantha Seager), Mel and Kayleigh (Jessica Barden). In April 2007 it was announced that he would be involved in a heavy marijuana smoking scene with Vernon Tomlin (Ian Reddington). It caused controversy, and the soap's executive producer Kieran Roberts stated that: "Not all stories are to the taste of all our viewers. But the vast majority of the time we get it right. We do not set out to shock and sensationalise." Although the scene did not air, there is a milder scene at the Morton's house-warming party where Vernon takes on a mellow disposition after smoking a joint Darryl gives him.

On 16 September 2007, Darryl's friend 'Stig' asks him to look after some ecstasy tablets. Afraid that his dad would find them, he asks David to look after them, but he hides them in one of his niece's dolls. However, when Bethany (Amy & Emily Walton) swallows one, David decides to protect his friend and bails Darryl out by taking the blame for possession. After a brief flirtation in the Rovers with barmaid Lauren Wilson (Lucy Evans), Darryl begins dating her. After a few dates of playing hard to get, they begin seeing each other on a more regular basis. He often pays for their dates and drinks, even though Mel tells him that his money is the only reason she is interested. Their involvement with each other comes to an end when Lauren becomes angry with him having no money, and states they were never an item.

Originally, Darryl was supposed to be leaving with the rest of the Morton clan. However, in an interview with the Liverpool Echo, Michael Starke who plays his father Jerry revealed they had kept Darryl's character on because of "his character links in with David Platt". Jerry collapses on 27 August 2008 and goes into care on 31 August, where Darryl and the rest of the family were told that Jerry is still alive and has a high chance of staying that way, but also that he may die. Jerry makes a full recovery but discovers that ex-wife Teresa Bryant (Karen Henthorn) has been poisoning him. Darryl, along with his siblings order Teresa out of the family home as a result. Amber Kalirai (Nikki Patel) becomes close to Darryl and they subsequently start a relationship.

Darryl opts to stay on in Weatherfield when Jerry decides that he is moving Kayleigh and Finlay (Ramone Quinn) to Spain in September 2008 due to his job and friends being on the Street. He allowed Teresa back into the house after finding her drunk on the street. He subsequently gets into trouble with Amber's overprotective father Dev (Jimmi Harkishin) after he discovers that he is having sex with Amber. In November 2008, Dev takes over Jerry's takeaway shop as it proves too much for Darryl to run alone. Darryl is dismayed to learn that as well as selling the business to Dev, Jerry is putting No. 6 on the market. After much difficulty of running the shop alone on his first day as owner, Dev eventually relents and asks Darryl to run the place for him.

Prior due to Jerry's departure, Darryl and his mother Teresa have been evicted form their home as Jerry decides to rent the house to new family, the Windasses. However, before the family can move in, Teresa protests to the idea by barricading herself in the house, refusing to come out. This prompts Darryl to bribe her by putting money in the letter box, but to no avail. The Windasses run out of patience and decide to do the job themselves by smashing the front door window with a crutch. When they run into the house, they discover that Teresa has handcuffed herself to the kitchen oven and cupboard doors. Since she has lost the keys to the handcuffs, the family's son Gary (Mikey North) decides to drag her out of the house. Having nowhere to go, Amber offers Darryl a place to stay with her and Dev, and agrees to the offer to stay, without Teresa.

In December 2008, Darryl becomes involved in a scheme of Pam Hobsworth (Kate Anthony)'s to make money. He agrees to sell her the used oil from the takeaway to convert into a form of biofuel. However, the project backfires for the pair during the New Year's Eve episode when Pam accidentally ignites the fuel causing it to explode. Darryl escapes with minor injuries while Pam is hospitalized.

March 2009 sees Darryl expressing concern that his relationship with Amber may not survive when she speaks of going to university in London but she reassures him that they will be fine. However, he is unconvinced and several months later, Amber kisses Mitch, a Uni friend after an argument with Darryl. He dumps her and she departs to University alone and upset.

Amber returns during Freshers' Week and makes up with Darryl at Jason Grimshaw (Ryan Thomas) and Tina McIntyre (Michelle Keegan)'s party. However, Amber's father Dev, not keen on having Amber choose Darryl over University, bribes him with £500 to dump Amber. Darryl took the money but doesn't cash it and tells Dev what he thinks of him. Amber later finds out thanks to Teresa's interference, and she leaves for Uni once again on the bus, with neither Darryl or Dev able to convince her to stay.

On 16 October 2009, Dev discovers that Umed Alahan (Harish Patel) and Teresa are selling curry in the kebab shop, although this is not Darryl's idea. Dev warns him that he is on thin ice, but Darryl, fed up with Dev, quits his job anyway. He then decides to go and live with his family in Spain. He bids farewell to Teresa before boarding the bus to the airport.

In May 2010, when Teresa departs Weatherfield, after her relationship with Lloyd Mullaney (Craig Charles) comes to an end, it is possible that she has gone to Spain to live with Darryl, this is implied after she makes a phone call, presumingly to Darryl, asking for a favour.

== Reception ==
When Ian Wylie from Manchester Evening News reported about the Morton family being written out, he wrote that he had come to like the characters of Darryl and Mel, even though their on-screen family "failed to fit the Weatherfield jigsaw". A reporter from Holy Soap described Darryl's most memorable moment as being caught in the fire drama after selling Pam's old cooking oil from the chip shop. On the What's on TV website, Darryl was described as "a likeable layabout" who "totally lacks energy and ambition".
