= Mel Morton =

Fictional character from Coronation Street

- Coronation Street character
- Portrayed by: Emma Edmondson
- Duration: 2007–2008
- First appearance: 18 March 2007
- Last appearance: 3 October 2008
- Introduced by: Steve Frost
In-universe information
- Occupation: Kebab shop assistant Police officer
- Father: Jerry Morton
- Mother: Teresa Bryant
- Brothers: Darryl Morton
- Sisters: Jodie Morton; Kayleigh Morton
- Half-brothers: Finlay Bryant
- Grandfathers: Wilf Morton

Mel Morton is a fictional character from the British soap opera Coronation Street, played by Emma Edmondson. She made her first appearance as Mel during the episode broadcast on 18 March 2007. She was introduced as part of the show's new family, the Mortons. Mel is characterised as gobby, serious-minded and sensible. She initially works in a kebab shop before becoming a police officer. Mel and Darryl Morton (Jonathan Dixon) are portrayed as twins and have a close relationship. Writers used him to bring out Mel's "bad side" but generally played her as the "sensible" family member.

Her early stories explored her relationships with her parents Jerry Morton (Michael Starke) and Teresa Bryant (Karen Henthorn). The latter was a tumultuous relationship, which explores Mel's objections to Teresa scheming ways. First Mel exposes Teresa as a liar when she tries to scam Lloyd Mullaney (Craig Charles). She later has Teresa arrested when she tries to poison Jerry. A notable storyline for Mel involved her being attacked in a girl-gang violence plot. The story was controversial and British newspapers accused the show of capitalising on the rise of violent teenage culture. In 2008, the show's producer Kim Crowther had decided to write out the entire Morton family. Mel's departure storyline features Mel leaving Weatherfield to live with Abi. Edmondson last appeared in the episode broadcast on 3 October 2008.

== Casting ==
Actress Emma Edmondson received confirmation to attend the initial auditions for the character in late 2006. It was the first time she had auditioned for a role in Coronation Street and believed she would be unsuccessful. She continued to be invited back to each stage of the audition process. She met Jonathan Dixon, who plays Mel's brother, Darryl Morton at each audition. Casting directors were auditioning hopefuls in sets of twins, but Edmondson and Dixon were not partnered until the final stage of auditioning, which was a screen-test scenario. Edmondson told Kris Green from Digital Spy that "it seemed too surreal" to believe they would be cast in such a show, but then it happened. Dixon added they were "quite lucky" to be paired together, with Edmondson stating that their likeness as twins was "weird" and "frightening". Edmondson was twenty-two when she was cast in the role and it was her first prominent role. She added "this is my big break, really, so very excited."

Edmondson is five years older than her character. She revealed that people became confused and presumed she was Mel's age after her casting. She received positive feedback from her family over the role as they were already Coronation Street viewers. The character and Edmondson's casting were publicised on 15 February 2007. The show also announced details about the entire Morton family, who arrive on Coronation Street to live and open a kebab shop. A reporter from RTÉ added that the Morton family would "cause a stir by upsetting some of the locals on their arrival." She made her first appearance as Mel during the episode broadcast on 18 March 2007.

== Development ==
=== Characterisation and family ===
A writer from ITV.com described Mel as the more responsible member of her roguish family, adding she is "gobby", "serious-minded" and "the sensible twin". Edmondson told Digital Spy's Green that Mel would be portrayed as a single, eighteen year old woman upon her introduction. She stated that "Mel is definitely a Morton in that she's brash and gobby, but out of the whole clan she's the most sensible." Mel is characterised as "quite intelligent" and wants a professional career. She helps her father, Jerry Morton (Michael Starke) out at his kebab shop. This depicts her as "family oriented", but she still focuses on building a career. Edmondson added "she wants to have her own life" away from the Mortons because "she'd like to use her brain a bit more" than being a kebab shop worker.

Edmondson believed that writers portrayed Mel and Darryl with contrasting personas. She explained that Mel is "definitely more sensible" compared to Darryl. They are "very close, but very different" and Darryl "brings out" Mel's "bad side". They have the closest relationship out of the Morton family, but do "fight a bit". Edmondson described the Morton family as "brash" and believed it would be "a running theme" during their duration in the show. Writers gave Mel "a calmer relationship" with the other Morton characters. When they are introduced into the series, the Mortons are without a mother role and Edmondson revealed that she abandoned the family. Mel's introduction story features her and her family moving onto Coronation Street. They move in with Jodie Morton (Samantha Seager), who had been introduced prior to the remainder of the Morton family. She remains living at number six Coronation Street during her entire duration. Writers portrayed Jerry as the firm head of the Morton family. Starke told Aoife Anderson from Evening Herald that Jerry is "pushy and totally in charge of his family, what he says goes." Starke acknowledged that critics would compare the Mortons to previous new families but hoped the Mortons would create their own niche.

In Jerry's early stories, he romances Eileen Grimshaw (Sue Cleaver) and invests more time in her than his own family. Jerry asks Mel to look after her sister, Kayleigh Morton (Jessica Barden). Mel fails to look after her correctly and she gets drunk and ill. Jerry realises he needs to put his family before his relationships and snubs Eileen. Starke told Kate Woodward from Inside Soap that Jerry was trying to enjoy his life after his divorce, but the remaining Morton family members face the strain instead. Starke described the incident with Mel and Kayleigh as "a slap in the face" for Jerry. Jodie had been tasked with looking after the family, but Starke believed Jerry would become more involved with his children. Starke added that the Morton's had received a mixed reaction from viewers and added the British newspapers had been unkind about the Mortons. He reasoned that writers introduced numerous Morton family members at once which hindered their early development.

Writers also explored Mel's problematic relationship with her mother, Teresa Bryant (Karen Henthorn). She begins scheming against Lloyd Mullaney (Craig Charles) and allows him to believe he fathered her son, Finlay Bryant (Ramone Quinn). Mel knows the identity of Finlay's biological father is a man named Gary. She decides to expose Teresa's lies. Henthorn told Kate Woodward from Inside Soap that "Mel drags him off to see Jerry" who explains Gary received DNA test confirmation that he is Finlay's father. However, Teresa shows no remorse for being exposed as a liar by Mel and Jerry.

=== Girl-gang violence ===
In March 2008, Edmondson stated that she was enjoying playing Mel and wished for more "gritty storylines". Producers hired Rachael Elizabeth to play Mel's police officer colleague, Abi Sharpe. Elizabeth and Edmondson quickly built a good rapport, with Elizabeth describing them both as being "on the same level". Writers created an issue based storyline for Mel involving girl gang violence. The story was publicised in July 2008. It explores Mel and Abi attempting to stop a fight between a gang of girls. The intervention results in a violent attack happening on Mel and Abi. A writer from the Daily Mirror reported that the scenes would be broadcast in September 2008. A Coronation Street publicist told them that "girl violence is a modern-day issue." Beth Hardie from the news outlet reported that Abi would intervene and save Mel from being attacked, only to be attacked herself. A gang of four girls then proceed to punch and stamp on Abi's head. Hardie described it as a "shocking scene of girl-gang violence."

Edmondson told Steve Hendry from Daily Record that Mel tries to defend herself and use her police training against them. But eventually she is overpowered by the girls and "just gets down on the floor and curls up into a ball." She explained that in the situation, it is the safest thing to do. Edmondson and Elizabeth filmed the violent stunts on a location shoot at Salford Quays. Edmondson enjoyed the experience for its acting value and claimed "it was all very safe". They rehearsed fight sequences and had a stunt coordinator to help them make the scenes realistic. She added that the guest actors playing the girls had to do more preparation, which "really spurred" her and Elizabeth on to make the scenes good.

The scenes were branded sensationalist and the show was accused of capitalising on the growing number of news stories about violence on British streets. The British broadcasting regulatory authority, Ofcom, received one pre-transmission complaint about the storyline. They refused to investigate it due to the scenes not being broadcast, but agreed to if more were received after broadcast. The scenes were also contentious because they were broadcast before the British 9PM Watershed. Edmondson was surprised by the strong reaction to the violent story. She defended the storyline to Hendry, branding it a "very true to life" story despite it not being "nice to watch". She added that soaps offer viewers escapism, but need "a certain amount of current and topical issues" for realism. A show publicist added that it was a current issue that needed exploring but noted the violence would not be "gratuitous". Katy Moon from Inside Soap reported that Mel would struggle with her guilt in the aftermath of the attack. She revealed that Mel blames herself for Abi's injuries. She then questions whether she will be an adequate police officer.

Writers followed the story with a revenge plot against the attackers when Mel attempts to find her attackers. Teresa wants revenge for her daughter following the attack. Jerry had thrown her out of their home after she poisoned him. Henthorn told Helen Childs from Inside Soap that Teresa uses it as an opportunity to return to Coronation Street. Teresa sees that Mel struggles to cope and privately vows to get revenge. She explained that Teresa decides to take revenge on Mel's behalf but discovers Mel is planning on going after the culprits alone and could jeopardise her policing career. Henthorn explained that Teresa reasons with Mel that "making things personal isn't the way to sort things out." However, Teresa does not take her own advice and locates one of the attackers in a toilet. Henthorn described mystery scenes which do not show the attack. Teresa is seen striking the attacker with her shoe before the scene ends. Henthorn added that it is "left to the imagination". Ultimately the revenge attack is a way to secure her place back into the Morton home. She added that her revenge "is a way of protecting her daughter" but foresaw it creating further problems. Henthorn opined "I can't see Jerry and Mel believing that Teresa's done a positive thing by wreaking revenge! It's bound to blow up in her face."

=== Departure ===
On 26 April 2008, it was announced that new producer Kim Crowther had decided to write out seven characters from the series. Crowther's choices included the entire remaining Morton family, including Mel. Crowther described them as "talented actors" and noted "we still have some interesting storylines to play with these characters." Of her departure, Edmondson said she was "sad to leave" but never expected to be in the show long-term. She added that she was just grateful for the opportunity. The Morton cast members all learned of their departures together, which made it easier for Edmondson to accept because they supported each other.

In one of Mel's final stories, writers explored her tumultuous relationship with Teresa. She decides to cook Jerry a meal to thank him for not reporting her to the police over her attempts to poison him. He refuses to eat it and argues with Teresa over her behaviour. She retaliates by revealing that she attacked a gang member and he should be thankful. Mel discovers that Teresa tried to poison Jerry when she listens to them arguing. Mel is shocked and arrests her own mother and takes her to the police station. Her final story coincides with the departures of other Morton family members. Mel decides to remain in Weatherfield with Darryl when Jerry, Kayleigh and Finlay move away. Darryl allows Teresa to move back into the home, causing Mel to announce her departure. She packs her belongings and goes to live with Abi.

== Storylines ==
Mel arrives with her father, Jerry (Michael Starke) and her siblings Darryl (Jonathan Dixon) and Kayleigh (Jessica Barden). She also has another brother, Finlay (Ramone Quinn). David Platt (Jack P. Shepherd) develops a crush on Mel, but she stood him up. He retaliates by lying that they have had sex but his mother, Gail Platt (Helen Worth) forces him to apologise. Mel applies to join the police force, and joins her friend Abi Sharpe (Rachael Elizabeth) in training to become a full-time Police Constable. Her grandfather, Wilf Morton (Rodney Litchfield) writes a false obituary about himself and has it published in the local newspaper, believing that Mel's chances of joining the police force may improve. He does so because of his known former dodgy dealings which may make the family also appear dodgy. Mel argues with her mother, Teresa (Karen Henthorn) when she arrives in Weatherfield. Mel goes on holiday and when she returns she discovers that Teresa has been lying to lengthen her stay in the Morton house. Mel asks Jerry to choose between herself and Teresa. Mel moves in with Abi when Jerry chooses Teresa.

The aftermath of the controversial storyline that involved the character.

Mel and Abi go on a night out to celebrate the end of their police training. Outside a bar venue, they witness a gang of girls fighting in the street. Abi calls the police and asks Mel to not get involved as they are both off duty, but she intervenes. Mel is punched and kicked by the girls and Abi attempts to break up the fight. She is assaulted with a glass bottle to the head and they further attack Abi by stamping on her head. The attackers are not charged with assault due to lack of evidence. Mel tries to get revenge on the girls but instead is confronted by Teresa and they reconcile. Teresa locates one of the attackers and follows her into the toilets and hits her over the head with a shoe.

Teresa and Mel argue again Mel discovers Teresa's schemes and arrests Teresa for attempted murder. Jerry refuses to collaborate Mel's story and Teresa is released without charge. This damages Mel's reputation with her fellow police colleagues. Jerry, Kayleigh and Finlay leave Weatherfield to live in Spain. Mel chooses not to leave because she had only just become a qualified police officer. Mel is upset when Darryl bringing a drunken Teresa back to the house. Mel decides to leave Weatherfield and go and live with Abi permanently.

== Reception ==
A reporter from Evening Herald opined that the Mortons arrived into the series with a "truckload of belongings and an avalanche of noise". They compared their arrival to that of the Battersby family, who arrived years earlier. Daily Record's Steve Hendry assessed that "the family have not always struck a chord with viewers." Ian Wylie of Manchester Evening News said that he was not surprised that the Morton family were written out because they "failed to fit the Weatherfield jigsaw." He thought that Mel, Jerry (Michael Starke) and Darryl's (Jonathan Dixon) departures were "a shame" because he had begun to like the characters. A writer from Female First branded the Mortons an "unruly clan" and described Mel as the more "responsible" twin. A writer from Inside Soap opined that "Mel shows none of her dad's soft-hearted approach when it comes to dealing with her mum."

A writer from ITV.com described Mel's most memorable scenes included Wilf writing his own false obituary to improve Mel's chances of becoming a police officer and the girl-gang attack plot. Another Daily Record reporter branded the girl-gang violence as "shocking scenes". A writer from the Evening Standard described the girl-gang violence story as the show's "biggest shock yet" complete with "gratuitous" violent scenes, concluding it was a "new low" for the show. They noted it caused controversy with viewers complaining via online forums. They branded the scenes "appalling" for attempting to capitalise on fears of "happy-slapping" style attacks that were rising in the British teenage population. Though they applauded Coronation Street for not "shying away from controversy".
