= Teresa Bryant =

Fictional character from Coronation Street

- Coronation Street character
- Portrayed by: Karen Henthorn
- Duration: 2007–2010
- First appearance: 28 March 2007
- Last appearance: 14 May 2010
- Created by: Jonathan Harvey
- Introduced by: Steve Frost (2007); Kim Crowther (2009)
In-universe information
- Occupation: Cleaner
- Husband: Jerry Morton (backstory)
- Sons: Darryl Morton; Finlay Bryant
- Daughters: Jodie Morton; Mel Morton; Kayleigh Morton

Teresa Bryant is a fictional character from the British ITV soap opera Coronation Street, played by Karen Henthorn. The character first appeared onscreen during the episode airing on 28 March 2007. She made her final appearance on 14 May 2010, when she leaves Weatherfield after a failed relationship with Lloyd Mullaney (Craig Charles).

== Development ==
Covering Teresa's interference with Jerry's medication, MSN described her as "evil". Henthorn, however, has refuted this aspect of her character, stating that "Teresa's far too wrapped up in herself to think through the consequences of what she's doing, because that would mean she'd have to take some responsibility for her actions! But she does not mean any real harm – she's just buying herself more time." Expanding on this, she added; "It's interesting to play Teresa this way, because – believe it or not – she does actually care for Jerry, and does not like the fact that she's making him ill. She's still being selfish though. I've never been a baddie before, so it's fantastic bringing Teresa to life. I think of her more as confused and a bit lost than evil – but she's playing a dangerous game, messing with Jerry's health like this..."

In an interview with ITV publicity, Henthorn spoke at length of her character saying: "Teresa is an opportunist, a survivor, and resourceful. What I like about her is that she does not give a stuff, but she does care what people think about her, but really her mouth just gets carried away with itself and she does not think and she just says how she feels." She also spoke about her character's treatment of her children stating: "She's very manipulative; she's a free spirit and she does not really care about her kids. She never wanted them. She's an old clubber, she's an old soak, they get in her way – oh, unless of course she can gets something out of them. Which is like a free flat, some food or a job off her son, but she's a terrible mother, she's terrible. It's great playing a terrible mother." Defending Bryant after a newspaper slammed the character she said: "I once read in a newspaper that she is an intoxicated harpy, but I think she is a bundle of fun. But then I would! I absolutely love her to bits, But then I wouldn't want to be her friend."

== Storylines ==
Teresa first appears on 28 March 2007, as the former wife of Jerry Morton (Michael Starke). She mistreats her children Kayleigh Morton (Jessica Barden) and Finlay Bryant (Ramone Quinn), resulting in Jerry taking them back to Weatherfield. On 4 April, Teresa leaves Weatherfield.

She returns to the Street in May 2008, following Jerry's heart attack. In June 2008, she cons Lloyd Mullaney into thinking that Finlay is his son, and takes advantage of Lloyd. Her con is eventually revealed to Jerry after Lloyd tells Jerry and Teresa's daughter Mel Morton (Emma Edmondson). Jerry responds by throwing Teresa out, though he later lets an insistent Teresa stay a little longer, much to Mel's dismay. Teresa reveals that her ex-boyfriend Gary Denmark, Finlay's father, used to beat her, and it is discovered he is now in prison. On 25 June 2008, Teresa begins a brief feud with the Websters after she attacks Rosie Webster (Helen Flanagan) at David Platt's (Jack P. Shepherd) house party when she makes jibes about Jerry's weight.

Tension relaxes when Mel goes on a holiday with cop mate Abi Sharpe (Rachael Elizabeth), but when Mel returns she is angry that Teresa is still living at No. 6 and Teresa manipulates Jerry, after he offers to move her into a flat. She lies by saying that the flat needs rewiring, as well as protesting that Jerry is increasingly unwell and pale, so Jerry lets her move back in. Mel soon discovers Teresa's lie and the mother and daughter have an argument. Mel later gives Jerry an ultimatum – Teresa moves out or she does, resulting in Mel going to stay at Abi's, later that episode, Jerry collapses and bangs his head on the coffee table leaving him with a bleeding ear. Teresa later confesses to Jerry whilst he is in hospital that she had been giving him extra medication so that he would depend on her more.

In September 2008, Teresa helps Mel get revenge after she is involved in a fight with a vicious girl gang which results in Abi being severely injured and being discharged from the police. Mel follows the ringleader of the gang to a bar, where she in turn is followed by Teresa. Mel intends to attack the girl, however Teresa convinces her not to as it would destroy her career. Mel sees sense and leaves, however unbeknownst to her, Teresa sneaks into the toilet and attacks the girl herself, putting her in hospital after landing a blow to the head with the heel of her shoe. As a result, Mel and Teresa temporarily reconcile and settle their differences. However, when Mel discovers that Teresa had plotted to poison Jerry, they fall out again and Mel arrests Teresa for attempted murder. The police later release her after Jerry denies that she tried to kill him. Teresa then turns up at No.6 that night begging for forgiveness but Jerry and the kids order her to leave. In October 2008, Darryl brings a drunken Teresa back to the house much to the disgruntlement of Mel who packs her things and leaves home unable to be under the same roof as her mother. Teresa causes Tina McIntyre (Michelle Keegan) to quit her job at the Prima Doner and begins working there herself alongside Darryl.

Prior to her departure on 8 December 2008, Teresa causes the Windasses, the new family whom Jerry agrees to rent No. 6 to, trouble when they can't move in due to Teresa barricading herself in the house all day. She refuses to move out after her and Darryl are evicted from their home. This causes the family's son Gary (Mikey North) to smash the door window to get to Teresa. However, when they get into the house, they discover that feisty Teresa has handcuffed herself to the oven and cupboard door, causing Gary to rip out the doors and throw her out of the house. She leaves the Street following her and Darryl's eviction from their house at 6 Coronation Street.

Teresa reappears in Weatherfield on 13 April 2009. She turns up at Roy's Rolls extremely drunk wanting to see Darryl as it is his birthday. However, she is quickly ejected by Anna Windass (Debbie Rush). Later, Dev Alahan (Jimmi Harkishin) says that she can stay in the flat above the corner shop as she has nowhere to live, on the condition that Darryl would stay there with her. She subsequently gets her old job back at the takeaway much to the disapproval of Minnie Chandra (Poppy Jhakra) who does not want to work with her.

Teresa is happy when she discovers that Dev has paid Darryl to move to Spain and break up with his daughter Amber (Nikki Patel), because he does not think Darryl is good enough for her. Teresa happily tells Amber what her father has done and Amber breaks up with Darryl and leaves for Oxford University, angry with Dev. Darryl throws Teresa out for this and the next day Lloyd finds her asleep in his taxi. She later has an argument with Liz McDonald (Beverley Callard) in the street, and when Liz and Lloyd also have an argument, he and Teresa go back to his place and have sex. Lloyd later gets back together with Liz and tells her he slept with someone that night but does not say who. Michelle Connor (Kym Marsh) soon tells her, and a fight breaks out in the pub between Liz and Teresa. Whilst attempting to punch Liz, Teresa accidentally punches Lloyd. Teresa subsequently goes on to have a casual relationship with Lloyd.

In March 2010, Teresa begins working in Underworld as a cleaner to the amusement of the manual workers. After Kelly Crabtree (Tupele Dorgu) intentionally dirties the floor, Teresa attacks her with a mop which prompts Carla Connor (Alison King) to break up the fight and sack Teresa on her first day of work. Shortly after, however, she regains her job after a grovelling apology.

In May 2010, Teresa soon realises that Lloyd has lost interest in her, becoming closer to lapdancer Cheryl Gray (Holly Quin-Ankrah). Liz advises Teresa to walk away from Lloyd with her head held high. She later leaves Lloyd's flat with a packed bag, announcing that she is leaving him and the Street for pastures new. After a final kiss, Lloyd walks off as Teresa waits for the bus. Clearly upset and lost, she calls one of her children, presumably Darryl, asking him for a favour, hence returning into his life once more.

== Reception ==
A writer from Inside Soap believed that Teresa was a "different kettle of fish" compared to Henthorn's EastEnders character "kindly" Julie Bates.
