= Jerry Morton =

Fictional character from Coronation Street

- Coronation Street character
- Portrayed by: Michael Starke
- Duration: 2007–2008
- First appearance: 18 March 2007
- Last appearance: 29 September 2008
- Introduced by: Steve Frost
In-universe information
- Father: Wilf Morton
- Wife: Teresa Bryant (backstory)
- Sons: Darryl Morton
- Daughters: Jodie Morton; Mel Morton; Kayleigh Morton
- Adoptive sons: Finlay Bryant

Jerry Morton is a fictional character from the British ITV soap opera Coronation Street, played by Michael Starke. He was introduced in March 2007. It was announced in April 2008 that Jerry and the rest of the Mortons would leave the show later in 2008.

== Character creation and development ==
In February 2007, it was announced in various British media, that actor Michael Starke, best known for playing Sinbad in the Channel 4 soap Brookside, would be joining the cast of Coronation Street as part of a new family, the Mortons. Jerry Morton – the single father of four children – was being introduced as the owner of a fast food takeaway restaurant. The family has been described as "a brash bunch" and it was reported that a "lot of thought [went] into making them a hit family with the viewers...Everyone is always excited when a new character comes into the show but a whole family gives the writers opportunities and we're sure viewers will love the Mortons.... There’ll be some explosive episodes as the Mortons work their way into the hearts, minds and pockets of Weatherfield’s finest. They’re loud, brash and fun and will bring madness and mayhem to the cobbles." The rest of the Mortons are Jerry's eldest daughter Jodie (Samantha Seager); his teenage twins Darryl and Mel (Jonathan Dixon and Emma Edmondson); youngest Kayleigh (Jessica Barden); and Jerry's father Wilf Morton (Rodney Litchfield).

Commenting on the role, Starke said, "There are going to be parallels between them and other families but the show is so unique I'm hoping we'll create our own niche". He has revealed that getting the part on Coronation Street at this stage in his career was "a dream... I pinch myself every morning. I think how many people would like to be playing my character? I'm the luckiest actor I know".

Jerry Morton has been described as "a hard-working man who dotes on his family and has no qualms on dodging the taxman." In an interview, Starke has said that Jerry is very outgoing, pushy and totally in charge of his family, "what he says goes." He goes on to say "His kids are the be-all-and-end-all and he'll do anything to support them and keep them going. He has his own set of morals in that respect.... He's not a put upon character... he's a go-getter. He thinks he's a lot younger than he is and he's got an idea of himself that no one else has – that's his talent, he uses it to the best of his ability."

== Storylines ==
Jerry arrives in Coronation Street with his family in March 2007, moving in and opening a new takeaway shop on the street. He immediately clashes with next-door neighbour Gail Platt (Helen Worth) over playing his music at full volume. He relies heavily upon his eldest daughter Jodie (Samantha Seager) to care for his younger children – Darryl (Jonathan Dixon), Mel (Emma Edmondson), Kayleigh (Jessica Barden) and Finlay (Ramone Quinn) – and run the kebab shop, leading to her departure in November that year. He begins a romance with Eileen Grimshaw (Sue Cleaver), which ends after several months when she tells him she feels she's becoming a surrogate mother to his children, and has no desire to assume that role.

Jerry suffers a heart attack in May 2008, prompting Kayleigh to call his ex-wife Teresa Bryant (Karen Henthorn). At first Jerry is horrified to see her but eventually concedes that he needs her help. Teresa moves in, much to Mel's displeasure, but soon outstays her welcome. In a bid to ensure Jerry would not force her to leave, she takes control of his medication and deliberately keeps him ill, so he would rely on her. By August 2008, Teresa's tampering takes its toll and Jerry collapses, banging his head on the coffee table and falling unconscious. He is taken to hospital, where his family learns that he could die. He recovers in early September and Teresa confesses to him. Jerry now refuses to see Teresa and Mel arrests Teresa for attempted murder, but Jerry refuses to make a statement. On 26 September 2008, Jerry tells his family that he wants them to move to Spain. After the scandal with Teresa, he yearns for a new start for the sake of his kids and his health. Mel and Darryl choose to stay as she had recently qualified as a police officer and he does not want to leave his friends and wants to run the kebab shop. Disappointed about their decisions but fully understanding, he leaves Coronation Street on 29 September 2008 with his younger children Kayleigh and Finlay, bound for a new life.

On 14 November, Dev Alahan (Jimmi Harkishin) phones Jerry in Spain and makes him an offer on the Kebab shop and within a week, their transaction was complete. On the day of the sale of the kebab shop, it is revealed Jerry had rented Number 6 to Eddie (Steve Huison), Anna (Debbie Rush) and Gary Windass (Mikey North), much to the chagrin of Darryl and Teresa.
