= List of Coronation Street characters introduced in 2007 =

The following is a list of characters that first appeared in the ITV soap opera Coronation Street in 2007, by order of first appearance.

== Roger Stiles ==
Roger Stiles
- Coronation Street character
- Portrayed by: Andrew Dunn
- Duration: 2007–2008
- First appearance: 1 January 2007
- Last appearance: 8 October 2008
In-universe information
- Occupation: Plumber

Roger Stiles, played by Andrew Dunn, is a plumber who fixes Janice Battersby's (Vicky Entwistle) heating in January 2007 when her boiler breaks down. After they date twice in the Rovers Return Inn, he invites Janice to go to France with him for a three-month holiday and she accepts. Janice returns alone in March and Roger returns two months later. In 2007, he invested £10,000 in Janice's stepdaughter Leanne's (Jane Danson) restaurant. Janice and Roger begin living together after Roger struggles to pay his rent, as a result of his loan to Leanne, which she eventually pays back. He saves the Barlows' kitchen roof when it is leaking in May 2008 and strikes up a friendship with Ken Barlow (William Roache).

In early August 2008, he, Janice, Bill Webster (Peter Armitage) and Audrey Roberts (Sue Nicholls) all embark on a holiday to France together, which ends in a minor car accident in which Roger suffers whiplash.

It was announced in September 2008 that Roger would be leaving the show the following month.

In October 2008, Roger finds out about Janice's Lottery scam after she is arrested by the police. Angry and ashamed with her actions, he packs up his van and leaves Janice.

== Jodie Morton ==
Jodie Morton
- Coronation Street character
- Portrayed by: Samantha Seager
- First appearance: 29 January 2007
- Last appearance: 11 November 2007
In-universe information
- Father: Jerry Morton
- Mother: Teresa Bryant
- Brothers: Darryl Morton
- Sisters: Mel Morton; Kayleigh Morton
- Half-brothers: Finlay Bryant
- Grandfathers: Wilf Morton

Jodie Morton was played by Samantha Seager. Jodie is introduced as the new owner of Diggory Compton's old bakery, along with her father Jerry (Michael Starke). Jodie and her grandfather, Wilf, arrive on Coronation Street, in January 2007, to ask Charlie Stubbs (Bill Ward) why the re-fit on the bakery is taking so long. She later finds out Charlie has been murdered, and asks his colleague Jason Grimshaw (Ryan Thomas) to continue with the re-fit. She also calls Dev Alahan (Jimmi Harkishin) "cheesey" when he attempts to flirt with her. Jodie enjoys arguing with rival chip shop worker, Cilla Battersby-Brown (Wendi Peters). Cilla states that Jodie has the body of her father, Jerry Morton, and the face of "Jabba The Hutt". Cilla also calls an exterminator and lies that the kebab shop, which they had now named "Jerry's Kebabs", is infested with rats. Jodie then retaliates by calling Cilla a liar. As part of the ongoing feud, Jodie takes Cilla's son Chesney's (Sam Aston) dog Schmeichel and keeps him in the family's garden shed later letting him go. Jodie has a brief romance with Lloyd Mullaney (Craig Charles). On 14 July 2007, it was announced that Seager was leaving Coronation Street. Jodie leaves Weatherfield on 11 November 2007, after feeling that Jerry had taken her for granted too many times and goes to live with a friend in London.

== Wilf Morton ==
Wilf Morton
- Coronation Street character
- Portrayed by: Rodney Litchfield
- First appearance: 29 January 2007
- Last appearance: 5 October 2007
In-universe information
- Sons: Jerry Morton
- Grandsons: Darryl Morton; Finlay Bryant (adoptive)
- Granddaughters: Jodie Morton; Mel Morton; Kayleigh Morton

Wilfred "Wilf" Morton is the father of Jerry Morton (Michael Starke). Wilf arrived on the street with his granddaughter, Jodie (Samantha Seager). He called Dev Alahan (Jimmi Harkishin) "chief", which Dev took to be a racist comment. However, Jodie explained that Wilf was not good with names and that this was simply his method of addressing people informally. Wilf was an ex-convict with an extensive criminal record, mostly as a result of his tendency to take part in scams, a trait that many members of his family had inherited. On discovering his granddaughter Mel's (Emma Edmondson) ambition to join the police, Wilf claimed he felt it was like "being stabbed". However, despite his former misdemeanours, Wilf was loyal to his family and after realising that his past record may have affected Mel and her application to join the Police, Wilf faked his death on Father's Day 2007, by submitting a false obituary to the Weatherfield Gazette. This action lead to Blanche Hunt (Maggie Jones) and Deirdre Barlow (Anne Kirkbride) believing he was dead - with the former arranging her own wake, despite still being alive, as a result. Wilf's intentions towards Blanche were never fully established; while the two often bickered, Blanche was genuinely shocked when she believed Wilf was dead, and Wilf made several flirtatious comments towards her. Although he appeared to live with his son and grandchildren, Wilf's appearances suddenly ceased and he was not referred to when his family left the Street in September 2008.

== Doreen Fenwick ==
Doreen Fenwick
- Coronation Street character
- Portrayed by: Barbara Young
- First appearance: 5 February 2007
- Last appearance: 2 December 2007
- Introduced by: Steve Frost
In-universe information
- Occupation: Retired (exotic dancer)
- Husband: Harold Thompson (1963–1985) (Widowed); Tommy Fenwick (1990–2006) (Widowed)

Doreen Fenwick was played by actress Barbara Young.

Doreen's character has been described as lively, bubbly and flirty. She has been revealed to have been a former member of Charlie Roscoe's Exotic Dancers, joining the troupe at only fifteen years old. One of Doreen's eyes is noticeably partially sighted. This has been claimed as an accident in which involved a lychee and a chopstick. Doreen was considered as a new love interest for Jack Duckworth (Bill Tarmey), following the death of his wife Vera (Liz Dawn), but this plan was shelved.

Barbara Young had starred in a number of television roles in a period of 40 years before playing Doreen Coronation Street, notably as Sadie Hargreaves in Family Affairs. She has also guest starred in Doctors, Holby City, the former Angels, as well as another Coronation Street role as Dot Stockwell in 1982.

=== Storylines ===
Doreen is first seen at The Kabin, looking for her friend Rita Sullivan (Barbara Knox). Norris Cole (Malcolm Hebden), Rita's business partner, is annoyed when Doreen flirts with Bill Webster (Peter Armitage) whilst waiting for Rita. Later that night, Doreen is finally reunited with her old friend, and she and Doreen begin to go on regular nights out. She and Rita come back drunk one time just as an unexploded bomb is found in Weatherfield, and the town is forced to evacuate to Bessie Street Primary School.

Shortly afterwards, Rita lets Doreen stay with her as Doreen tells her that her flat is being repaired. However, Rita discovers that Doreen is faking her flat being repaired and removed of asbestos. Rita then tells Doreen to pack her bags and leave. Rita confesses to Norris that she is missing Doreen's company but refuses to make the first move. Norris secretly arranges to meet Doreen and persuades her to make up with Rita. The two make up over a drink in the Rovers Return.

Following this, Doreen begins helping out in The Kabin, notably when Rita takes a holiday. After Norris has proposed and been rejected by Rita, he goes on to propose to Doreen, only to discover that both George Trench (Keith Barron) and Ivor Priestley (Paul Copley) have already done so too. After some persuasion from Rita, Norris later retracts his proposal but Doreen declines George and Ivor's proposals too, stating that she has changed her mind about getting married.

Doreen was last mentioned on 6 December 2010 by Rita who stated that she would be meeting her in Weatherfield town centre but, just as Rita is going to meet her, Doreen telephones to cancel because of illness. Rita returns to her flat and is injured as a result of the tram crash.

== Kasia Barowicz ==
Kasia Barowicz
- Coronation Street character
- Portrayed by: Irena Rodic
- First appearance: 26 February 2007
- Last appearance: 16 April 2007
In-universe information
- Occupation: Seamstress

Kasia Barowicz arrives in 2007 as a Polish worker at the Underworld factory. She is their second Polish employee following Wiki Dankowska (Wanda Opalinska).

On the morning of 16 April 2007, whilst she is working illegally for Carla Connor (Alison King) in the factory, Kasia trips whilst carrying a stack of boxes and falls down a flight of stairs, and dies from the injuries she sustains. Carla panics at the thought that her business could be scuppered and does not call an ambulance. Instead, she phones her husband Paul (Sean Gallagher) who hurries to the factory and helps her cover up the accident. Paul, Carla and Paul's brother Liam (Rob James-Collier) all lie to the police about the time Kasia died. They know that the police would ask questions if they called the ambulance immediately. As Kasia is working out of hours after doing two shifts, they are breaking the law. Liam even clocks Kasia in at eight o'clock, the time that her legal shift was due to begin, in an attempt to avoid further questions and cover their tracks.

That morning, Sally Webster (Sally Dynevor), comes in for material for daughter Rosie's (Helen Flanagan) school play costume. Sally is suspicious and knows that something does not add up. However, the truth behind Kasia's death remains a secret and nobody is charged for her death.

== Wiki Dankowska ==
Wiki Dankowska
- Coronation Street character
- Portrayed by: Wanda Opalinska
- Duration: 2007–2009
- First appearance: 2 March 2007
- Last appearance: 6 February 2009

Wiki Dankowska (Polish pronunciation: [ˈviki daŋˈkɔfska]), played by Wanda Opalinska, makes her first appearance on 2 March 2007 as a new employee of Carla Connor (Alison King) at the Underworld factory. As a Polish immigrant, she is paid less than other employees, and they become concerned that their pay could be affected by this. She is bullied by Joanne Jackson (Zaraah Abrahams) and Janice Battersby (Vicky Entwistle), but Hayley Cropper (Julie Hesmondhalgh) secures her equal pay for her from Liam Connor (Rob James-Collier). She is the only factory worker to have seen Kasia Barowicz (Irena Rodic) fall and die in the factory during an illegal shift. Paul, Carla and Liam cover up Kasia's death until 8:00am the following morning, when the death would be covered by their insurance. Wiki goes along with this when Carla tells her that if they don't do this, Kasia's family would get no compensation money. Wiki has a son back home in Poland, aged 21, and she works in Underworld to support him.

She then starts her own business selling underwear. In early 2008, Wiki spots Kelly Crabtree (Tupele Dorgu) stealing rejected underwear from Underworld to sell at her own knicker party, and Wiki is torn between telling Carla or keeping it secret. She is soon accused of stealing them herself but Kelly steps forward to take the blame. She rarely gets angry, but when Janice returns to work, having been arrested for fraud, after it is discovered she had kept the winnings that had been meant for the Lottery syndicate she is a part of for herself, Wiki is very angry with her and declares that it would be a long time before their friendship could be repaired.

On 25 December 2008, she spends Christmas with Emily Bishop (Eileen Derbyshire), Norris Cole (Malcolm Hebden) and Mary Taylor (Patti Clare), where she cooks them a traditional Polish dinner. Although they are not impressed she did not notice and gets drunk.

On 6 February 2009 just after Tony Gordon (Gray O'Brien) confesses to Carla that he killed Liam Connor, Wiki inadvertently interrupts them to say that she is going back to Poland, to look after her ill mother.

== Derek ==
Derek
- Coronation Street character
- Portrayed by: David Hounslow
- First appearance: 9 March 2007
- Last appearance: 15 July 2007
In-universe information
- Occupation: Delivery man
- Wife: Linda

Derek was a delivery man at the Rovers Return Inn who landlady Liz McDonald (Beverley Callard) immediately takes a shine to. He appears to feel the same way, so she attempts to get closer to him. Liz becomes more keen on Derek as her husband Vernon Tomlin's (Ian Reddington) lazy behaviour starts to annoy her, and she continues to feel this way even after she and Vernon get engaged. The fact that Derek is married fails to deter her.

When Vernon is supposed to be meeting Liz for dinner, he becomes too drunk to turn up so she asks Derek to join her. When he arrives, they both have a good time and, on the way back to The Rovers, Liz and Derek share a passionate kiss for the first time. After this, Liz continues to play around with Derek and eventually sleeps with him for the first time after he books a hotel room for them both. The two then later agree to continue seeing each other after Derek shows up at the pub pretending to be delivering.

Their affair ends in July 2007 after Liz visits him at his flat and they sleep together. Derek's wife returns home unexpectedly and Liz is forced to hide on the outside balcony, naked, and is wolf-whistled by some nearby window cleaners. Liz splits up with Derek after telling him that she is too old to be hiding on balconies and having affairs.

A writer from ITVX put Derek on their list of Liz' top ten lovers.

== Kayleigh Morton ==
Kayleigh Morton
- Coronation Street character
- Portrayed by: Jessica Barden
- Duration: 2007–2008
- First appearance: 18 March 2007
- Last appearance: 29 September 2008
In-universe information
- Father: Jerry Morton
- Mother: Teresa Bryant
- Brothers: Darryl Morton
- Sisters: Jodie Morton; Mel Morton
- Half-brothers: Finlay Bryant
- Grandfathers: Wilf Morton

Kayleigh Morton, portrayed by Jessica Barden, is introduced as the youngest daughter in the Morton family. She first arrived in Weatherfield in March 2007. In September 2008, Kayleigh departs for a new life in Spain with her father and Finlay.

== Finlay Bryant ==
Finlay Bryant
- Coronation Street character
- Portrayed by: Ramone Quinn
- Duration: 2007–2008
- First appearance: 6 April 2007
- Last appearance: 29 September 2008
In-universe information
- Occupation: Student
- Father: Gary Denmark
- Mother: Teresa Bryant
- Adoptive father: Jerry Morton
- Half-brothers: Daryl Morton
- Half-sisters: Jodie Morton; Mel Morton; Kayleigh Morton

Finlay Bryant, portrayed by Ramone Quinn, is the son of Teresa Bryant (Karen Henthorn), ex-wife of Jerry Morton (Michael Starke). In April 2007, Jerry discovers that Teresa has gone on holiday, leaving their daughter Kayleigh (Jessica Barden) and her half-brother Finlay on their own. Jerry takes the children back home with him, so Finlay remains with the rest of the Mortons at No 6 Coronation Street. In June 2008, Teresa briefly cons Lloyd Mullaney (Craig Charles) into thinking Finlay is his son so that she can get money out of him. In April 2008, it was reported by The Manchester Evening News that the character would depart later in the year with the rest of the Morton family and was confirmed the following week.

In September 2008, Finlay departs for a new life in Spain with his stepfather and Kayleigh.

== Christian Gatley ==
Christian Gatley
- Coronation Street character
- Portrayed by: Andrew Turner
- Duration: 2007, 2013
- First appearance: 10 September 2007
- Last appearance: 6 December 2013
- Introduced by: Steve Frost (2007); Stuart Blackburn (2013)
In-universe information
- Occupation: Record Store Manager; Supermarket Assistant
- Parents: Hayley Cropper; Cath
- Stepfather: Roy Cropper
- Wife: Holly Gatley (2008–)
- Sons: Sam Gatley
- Daughters: Maisie Gatley

Christian Gatley is the son of transgender character Hayley Cropper (Julie Hesmondhalgh). He first appeared on the show on 10 September 2007. Christian manages a record shop on Ashton Road, Manchester called Sound Garden. At first Hayley told Christian that she was his aunt but Roy insisted that she tell him the truth, which she eventually did. Christian did not take the news well and after angrily lashing out, he runs away. Becky Granger (Katherine Kelly) visits Christian and attacks him in revenge for him attacking Hayley. After she controls her anger, she told him that whilst Hayley probably wasn't what he expected his father to look like, she's great and he is nothing. She makes clear to him that whilst he hurt Hayley, she would not want anyone to hurt him back. Three weeks later, it was revealed that Christian had resigned from the record shop and left Manchester.

In September 2013, Hayley contacts Christian after learning that she has terminal cancer, wanting to make her peace with him. Christian agrees to meet her and they arranged a date and time but Christian does not arrive, upsetting Hayley. However, the next day he comes to the café and apologises for his behaviour when they previously met, he tells Hayley that he is now married and has two children, Maisie and Sam. Christian goes for a drink with Roy and Hayley in The Rovers Return. Hayley does not tell Christian about her illness and when he explains to Hayley that he does not want to introduce her to his children until they are old enough to understand "that their grandad is now their granny", Roy loses his temper and calls Christian a bigot. He and Hayley leave the pub, and Christian is left alone. Christian returns again on 2 December 2013. It seems he is in financial trouble and Hayley gives him £5000. Christian also allows Hayley to meet his children briefly.

== Lauren Wilson ==
Lauren Wilson
- Coronation Street character
- Portrayed by: Lucy Evans
- Duration: 2007–2008
- First appearance: 26 November 2007
- Last appearance: 16 April 2008
In-universe information
- Occupation: Barmaid
- Sisters: Violet Wilson
- Nephews: Dylan Wilson

Lauren Wilson is Violet Wilson's (Jenny Platt) younger sister played by Lucy Evans. In April 2008, Lauren was written out after proving unpopular with viewers.

Lauren had previously been working in Ayia Napa in a bar called 'Man-unition', it is clear from the outset that straight-laced Violet does not get along with her wild younger sibling. Lauren becomes barmaid at the Rovers, and moves in as a lodger with Eileen Grimshaw (Sue Cleaver). Lauren has a relationship with Darryl Morton (Jonathan Dixon), but it is clear to everyone but Darryl that she is using him for money and free nights out on the town. Eventually Darryl stands up to her when she suggests he steal from his father Jerry Morton (Michael Starke) when he runs out of money. Lauren immediately dumps him.

In the days leading up to her departure, she begins to suggest to Sean Tully (Antony Cotton) that they take a break together, although it is apparent that she is just trying to wrangle a free holiday out of him (especially as she has just lost her job at the Rovers and has no intention of paying the rent she owes to Eileen). Sean returns from the holiday alone, explaining that Lauren, as expected, had abandoned him immediately upon leaving the plane once they had arrived in Spain. She had started dating a rich boyfriend and had no intention of returning.

== Harry Mason ==
Harry Mason
- Coronation Street character
- Portrayed by: Jack Ellis
- Duration: 2007–2008
- First appearance: 3 December 2007
- Last appearance: 26 September 2008
In-universe information
- Occupation: Bookmaker
- Wife: Clarissa Mason (1997–)
- Sons: Dan Mason

Harry Mason was played by Jack Ellis. He made his first onscreen appearance on 3 December 2007 when he and his son Dan Mason (Matthew Crompton) took over the betting shop on Rosamund Street.

The character's casting was widely reported in the media, due to the fact Harry was to be portrayed by Jack Ellis, well known for his role as prison officer Jim Fenner in Bad Girls. The character and his on-screen son were described by a Coronation Street spokesperson as "a colourful addition [who] will ruffle a few feathers".

The character is described by the programme's official website as: "a man on a mission to hide his financial assets. With three ex-wives and members of the criminal fraternity on the look-out for him, he needs to be sure that he hides those funds in a secure place. Harry is a wide-boy, someone who enjoys ducking and diving. He has a bit of a rough edge to him and operates on just the right side of the law."

=== Storylines ===
Harry first arrives on the street on 3 December 2007, along with his son Dan, to take over the betting shop. Harry criticizes Dan over his choice of car and later tries to entice Eileen Grimshaw (Sue Cleaver) away from Streetcars while meeting with Eileen's boss Steve McDonald (Simon Gregson). On 31 March 2008, Harry saves Amy Barlow (Elle Mulvaney), Steve's daughter, from being run over by a van. It also becomes clear on the same day that Harry is attracted to Steve's mother, Liz Tomlin (Beverley Callard). After some flirting, Harry invites Liz to the opening of the new bookies when her husband Vernon (Ian Reddington) leaves for a few weeks for a concert on a cruise ship.

It was reported in April 2008 that Harry's ex-wife Clarissa would be coming to the Street.

In May 2008, Harry invites Liz round for dinner at his home, an invitation which she accepts. Towards the end of the evening, Harry leans in for a kiss; however, Liz reluctantly rejects his advances, thinking of Vernon and not wanting to be disloyal to her husband. The following day, Harry invites her to lunch at the flat. Just as they are about to kiss for a second time they are interrupted by an angry Steve who expresses disgust at Harry and Liz's actions in Vernon's absence.

In July 2008, after Liz has separated from Vernon, they strike up a close friendship, which makes Clarissa (Alexandra Boyd), Harry's ex-wife react badly. On 28 July 2008, Harry takes Liz back to his house where Clarissa catches them kissing, with Harry and Liz having no knowledge that Clarissa is hiding there. Clarissa and Harry then decide to give their marriage another try and reconcile. Harry then tells Liz he wants to end their relationship. Liz and Clarissa have a fight on 30 July 2008. The same day Clarissa tells Harry to move back in with her.

Clarissa and Harry reappear on the street in September 2008 and Harry and Liz resume their fling, and this soon develops into an affair. When Clarissa discovers the truth from Liz, they both team up to get revenge on Harry for two-timing them both. Liz invites Harry into the back room of the Rovers with the promise of sex, and as she strips Harry to his underwear Clarissa enters the room with her camera phone and takes the incriminating photos of Harry. She later agrees to take Harry back as long as he promises never to set foot in Weatherfield again, and leaves Dan in charge of the bookies. Harry leaves Weatherfield on 26 September 2008 to start a new life with Clarissa.

== Dan Mason ==
Dan Mason
- Coronation Street character
- Portrayed by: Matthew Crompton
- Duration: 2007–2008
- First appearance: 3 December 2007
- Last appearance: 14 November 2008
In-universe information
- Occupation: Bookmaker
- Father: Harry Mason

Daniel James "Dan" Mason was played by Matthew Crompton. He first appears on screen on 3 December 2007 and last appears on 14 November 2008.

Before the character's arrival, the media reported on the Masons because they were to be portrayed by actors that the viewing public were already quite familiar with.

After the character's first six months onscreen the actor's contract was extended by one year due to the character's popularity with the viewing public.

=== Storylines ===
Dan first arrives on the street on 3 December 2007, along with his father Harry (Jack Ellis) to take over the betting shop. Dan's first act of business was to track down Lloyd Mullaney (Craig Charles) who owes the previous bookie Stan a debt of £400. He finds Lloyd but Lloyd denies his identity. Later in The Rovers Return pub, Dan tricks Lloyd by calling him over by his name and Lloyd answers. Dan tells him of his debt and that he is serious about recovering it. Later, Dan begins flirting with barmaid Michelle Connor (Kym Marsh), much to the anger of Michelle's boyfriend Steve McDonald (Simon Gregson).

From the start of the character's arrival, Dan is attracted to a number of local women. Mel Morton's (Emma Edmondson) police officer colleague Abi Sharpe (Rachael Elizabeth) takes an interest in Dan and they go back to his home where Dan's father Harry is clearing a load of junk out, making Abi even think that there has been a robbery. She decides to leave, mentioning that she has got to get up early for duty. Dan then lies to Harry about her occupation, saying that she is a nurse rather than a police officer. Harry's interference in Dan's love life continues when he ruins Dan's chances of bedding factory machinist Kelly Crabtree (Tupele Dorgu).

Dan begins to flirt with Leanne Battersby (Jane Danson), and there is an instant attraction. They begin dating, and Dan suggests that she burn down Vallandros, her restaurant as a joke. This results in Leanne taking it seriously and manipulating her chef Paul Clayton (Tom Hudson) into burning it down for her as part of an insurance scam. Dan is frustrated with Leanne because she makes him pretend they are not together and punches him in the face, humiliating him in public. Despite Leanne's unpredictable nature, he gives her a false alibi to the police over the restaurant fire. However, Paul becomes jealous of Dan's relationship with Leanne and decides to turn himself in, and implicates Dan and Leanne's involvement. Shortly after, Dan and Leanne are arrested and questioned but soon released. They later discover that they have escaped a prison sentence when Paul is due to face charges but flees the country.

On 4 June 2008, Norris Cole (Malcolm Hebden) scratches Steve's car. Steve, outraged by this, blames Dan for the damage, believing him to be responsible. On 6 June 2008, Steve steals Dan's mobile phone from his car in revenge. Steve refuses to return it unless Dan pays the bill for the damage to his car. Dan refuses knowing he is innocent. Steve and Dan have a fight in the Rovers Return during its closing times after Dan accidentally elbows Steve in the eye whilst attempting to retrieve his phone. When Steve throws Dan's phone down into the cellar, Steve locks Dan in the pub cellar overnight. The following morning, Dan is discovered clutching his chest in pain. He is rushed to hospital where it is discovered that he is suffering from a ruptured spleen. When Dan recovers he lies to the police about the nature of his injuries and Steve is arrested. As a result of Steve's actions, Dan has to have his spleen removed. Steve panics, thinking he is to be charged with attempted murder but Harry convinces Dan to tell the truth.

In September 2008, Dan discovers, to his dismay, that Harry is selling the bookies and shortly afterwards he leaves the Street. Knowing that he cannot afford to pay back the interest on a business loan, Leanne offers to give Dan the £10,000 that he needs as a result of her and her stepmother Janice (Vicky Entwistle) winning £25,000 in a lottery scam that Dan does not know about. Dan delightfully accepts Leanne's offer. He eventually discovers the truth prior to Janice turning herself in to the police and he breaks up with Leanne. Leanne is left heartbroken but Dan soon moves on and begins dating Kelly.

On 14 November 2008, Dan's relationship with Kelly ends when he sells the bookies to Peter Barlow (Chris Gascoyne) and he leaves Weatherfield without her.

== Nick Neeson ==
Nick Neeson
- Coronation Street character
- Portrayed by: Robert Horwell
- Duration: 2007–2008
- First appearance: 5 December 2007
- Last appearance: 18 April 2008
In-universe information
- Wife: Wendy Neeson
- Sons: Ryan Connor
- Adoptive sons: Ali Neeson

Nick Neeson was played by Robert Horwell. Nick was first seen on the street stalking Ryan Connor (Ben Thompson) in December 2007. Ryan constantly saw Nick's car and was worried when he shouted out his name. Michelle Connor (Kym Marsh) and her brother Liam Connor (Rob James-Collier) went to confront Nick and got a shock in return when Nick said he believed to be Ryan's dad. It was then revealed that Ryan is the biological son of Nick, but Alex is his legal son. Ryan went away for a week with Nick on a Canoeing holiday and meets up with Ryan on occasions.

Nick was last seen in April 2008 when Michelle was about to go to Ireland with Alex and Ryan to see her parents.

== Abi Sharpe ==
Abi Sharpe
- Coronation Street character
- Portrayed by: Rachael Elizabeth
- Duration: 2007–2008
- First appearance: 12 December 2007
- Last appearance: 12 September 2008
In-universe information
- Occupation: Police Officer

Police Constable Abi Sharpe was a police officer friend of Mel Morton (Emma Edmondson), first seen in 2007. She had an on off flirtatious relationship with bookie Dan Mason (Matthew Crompton). Abi flirted with Mel's twin brother, Darryl on their 19th birthday, to console him after Lauren Wilson (Lucy Evans) had dumped him, in order to make Lauren jealous. Abi reappeared on 7 July 2008, helping Mel sort out her father, Jerry (Michael Starke), after he had a heart attack and was drinking alcohol. Mel also asked her to do a police check on her mother's ex-boyfriend, Gary Denmark who she claimed beat her. At the end of August, Mel was prompted to stay at Abi's with Teresa persisting to live at No.6.

On 3 September 2008 Mel and Abi were celebrating completing their police training when they overheard some youth girls fighting. Abi called the police force while Mel attempted to break up the fight, when Abi saw Mel getting hurt she joined in to save her friend. The fight ended with Abi left with a bleeding eye after sustaining an injury with a glass bottle. Mel called an ambulance and told Jerry about the situation, in shock, Abi was safely transported to hospital. Abi later told Mel in hospital that she needed eye surgery as she had a detached retina. After the operation, Abi was confined to desk duty at the police station because of the damage done to her eye, this was much to her disappointment as she longed to be on the beat. This caused Mel to feel very guilty. Abi later relocated to Stretford and Mel soon followed.

== Wendy Neeson ==
Wendy Neeson
- Coronation Street character
- Portrayed by: Jane Slavin
- Duration: 2007–2008, 2018
- First appearance: 17 December 2007
- Last appearance: 19 March 2018
- Introduced by: Steve Frost (2007); Kate Oates (2018)
In-universe information
- Husband: Nick Neeson
- Sons: Ryan Connor
- Adoptive sons: Ali Neeson

Wendy Neeson was played by Jane Slavin. She is the biological mother of Ryan Connor (Ben Thompson), but Alex (Dario Coates) is her legal son. Wendy told Alex's biological mother Michelle Connor (Kym Marsh) that she and her husband Nick (Robert Horwell) had divorced over the row about Alex not being their biological son. She acted up when Alex went to stay with Michelle, and went to claim her son several times, and finally on 7 March 2008 managed to take Alex back home. Wendy, unlike Nick, was curious about Ryan but when he showed no interest in her, concentrated on Alex.

In 2018, ten years after her last appearance, Wendy turned up at Ali's work placement Rosamund Street Medical Centre where the pair of them got into an argument in his office, which resulted in her leaving. A few days later, Wendy returned to beg Ali to return home to her; however, he refused and demanded to be left alone.

== Ali Neeson ==
Ali Neeson
- Coronation Street character
- Portrayed by: Dario Coates (2007–2008); James Burrows (2018–2020)
- Duration: 2007–2008, 2018–2020
- First appearance: Episode 6709/6710; 17 December 2007
- Last appearance: Episode 10024; 13 March 2020
- Introduced by: Steve Frost (2007); Kate Oates (2018)
In-universe information
- Other names: Alex Neeson
- Occupation: Student; Trainee doctor
- Father: Dean Powell
- Mother: Michelle Connor
- Adoptive father: Nick Neeson
- Adoptive mother: Wendy Neeson
- Stepfather: Steve McDonald (2015–2017)
- Brothers: Ryan Connor (adoptive)
- Half-brothers: Ruairi McDonald
- Grandfathers: Barry Connor
- Grandmothers: Helen Connor
- Uncles: Paul Connor; Liam Connor
- First cousins: Liam Connor Jr.
- Other relatives: Johnny Connor; Carla Connor; Aidan Connor; Kate Connor

Ali Neeson first appeared on 17 December 2007, played by Dario Coates. He became involved in the show's first ever baby swap storyline, where he had been accidentally swapped with Ryan Connor (Ben Thompson), shortly following their birth. The character departed in 2008. He returned ten years later in 2018, now played by James Burrows. In February 2020, it was announced that Burrows had quit the show and would be departing the following month.

Michelle Connor (Kym Marsh) gives birth to a son. However, he was accidentally swapped with Ryan, who was born on the same day. As a result, Michelle and Dean brought up Nick and Wendy's son as Ryan, believing him to be theirs, while Nick and Wendy brought up Dean and Michelle's son as Alex.

Neither Nick and Wendy nor Michelle and Dean were aware that their sons had been mixed up until Alex fell ill and was rushed into the hospital when he was 14 years old. It was then that his blood group was checked. His blood group was identified as being significantly different from Nick's and as a result Nick was told that it wasn't possible for Alex to be his biological son. Nick subsequently assumed that Wendy had had an affair, causing them to split with her denying any affair. Wendy, however, took a DNA test which revealed that Alex wasn't her son either. The doctor told them that the only possible explanation was that Alex had been mixed up with another baby after being born. Nick hired a private detective who discovered that there was only one baby born in the same ward at the same time as Alex - Ryan, leading Nick to believe that Ryan was his biological son.

After Nick began to stalk Ryan around Christmas 2007, Michelle decided to confront Nick after discovering his house in Sale. Michelle was shocked when Alex answered the door as he greatly resembled Dean. Nick later explained to Michelle that he believed Alex and Ryan were swapped at birth but she accused him of lying. However, she was later persuaded by Nick to take a DNA test.

Ryan ran away when he found out about Nick's claims and waited outside his house. Alex approached him and demanded to know why he had been hanging around. Ryan refused and walked away from him, but Alex was persistent and wrestled him to the ground. When Ryan refused once more, Alex punched him. Ryan told him that Nick claimed to be his father and that he and Alex were swapped at birth. Alex was incredulous and punched him a second time causing the two to fight. They tumbled on to the road and Alex was hit by a car. The two boys were then taken to the hospital with no major injuries.

The DNA test results showed that Nick's claims were true - Alex and Ryan had indeed been swapped at birth and Alex was Michelle's biological son. Nick informed Michelle that Alex, like Ryan, wanted things to stay as they were and he didn't want to see her. Despite this decision, Michelle waited for Alex outside his school and introduced herself as his mother, giving him her number and telling him to contact her if he ever wanted to talk. This led to Michelle feeling guilty and she panicked when Alex arrived at the Rovers to see her. He told her that he had never been happy with Nick and Wendy.

When Michelle and Alex arranged to meet again, she was hurt when he stood her up. When Michelle's parents visited for her brother Liam's wedding, Alex insisted that he wanted to meet his family and, much to the annoyance of Michelle, introduced himself to her mother as her real grandson. This made Alex feel guilty and he apologised to Michelle, who agreed to talk with him about the family history. This caused Ryan to clash with Alex once again because he thought Alex was intruding on his life.

When Alex arrived on Coronation Street once again to see Michelle, he told Norris Cole in The Kabin that he was Michelle's son and that he and Ryan were swapped. Nick rang Michelle to tell her that Alex had run away, and Alex was caught shoplifting. He was escorted to the Rovers by a Police Officer after telling them he lived there and Michelle agreed to let him stay after he claimed he was not happy with Nick or Wendy. Alex's stay at the Rovers caused much tension and Michelle constantly had to defend him against Vernon and Liz. Alex also constantly refused to move back with Wendy and was allowed to stay for longer and longer. When Alex let Steve's daughter Amy wander off, Alex locked himself in the pub when he realised how angry Steve was. Alex unlocked the door when Michelle told him he could stay as long as he wanted. His prolonged presence at the Rovers caused Ryan to move in with Liam and Maria. Michelle also stopped Wendy from taking Alex home, arguing he could stay as long as he wanted. Michelle, however, soon realised that Alex couldn't stay forever and arranged for Wendy to take him home. This caused Alex to refuse to see Michelle again because she went back on her word.

Michelle became upset when Ryan started to see Nick and was especially frustrated because Alex wouldn't see her. Steve, however, persuaded Alex to meet up with her again after seeing how upset she was. Alex met up with Michelle again and she decided to visit her parents in Ireland with Alex so that he could meet the family.

Alex (now going by the name of Ali) returned to Coronation Street in 2018 as a trainee doctor, working at the medical centre. Liz McDonald (Beverley Callard) recognises Ali and asks why he hasn't spoken to Michelle. He persuades Liz to not tell Michelle that he is back in Weatherfield, and she agrees. However, at Michelle and Robert's engagement party, Michelle cuts her hand and goes to the medical centre where she encounters Ali. Ali treats Michelle's hand but refuses to establish a relationship with her, upsetting Michelle. However, when he finds out about Aidan Connor's (Shayne Ward) suicide, he shows concern for Michelle, despite Robert being the bearer of the news. He and Michelle begin to repair their relationship.

Ryan (now played by Ryan Prescott) returns to the street for Michelle and Robert's wedding, and he and Ali clash at Robert's stag do. Ali's medical skills are put to good use at Michelle and Robert's wedding; first when Pat Phelan (Connor McIntyre) forces Ali to tend to Nicola's (Nicola Thorp) gunshot wound and again when Phelan takes Michelle hostage and she is shot in the Bistro kitchen in a botched escape attempt.

Ali is pulled into Ryan's feud with gangster Ronan Truman (Alan McKenna) after Ronan swears revenge on Ryan for leaving his son Cormac to die from a drug overdose. Michelle attempts to leave Weatherfield with her sons but they are chased by Ronan. Their car breaks down and Ryan tries to face Ronan himself but is hit by his car. Ali and Michelle tend to him and when Leanne Battersby comes to investigate, Ronan runs her over and crashes. Ali finds him impaled by a broken fencepost. Ronan promises to come after the Connors, so Ali pulls the stake out, causing him to die from blood loss. He lies to his family and the police saying that Ronan pulled it out himself. Ali struggles with his guilt in the following weeks and becomes moody and violent, lashing out at his family and getting into fights. He eventually reveals the truth to Michelle who tells Robert and then Ryan.

In 2019, Ali starts a romance with Maria Connor (Samia Ghadie). This is complicated by his growing addiction to diazepam, which causes him to develop seizures.

On September 4, 2020 offscreen, Ali was sentenced to 4 months imprisonment for assaulting Gary Windass (Mikey North) after a love triangle broke out between him and Maria, later Ali was released off-screen (due to his good behaviour) and has started a new life in Liverpool.

== Other characters ==
Character	Episode date(s)	Actor	Circumstances
Court usher/clerk	17 January, 18 April 2008, 27 November 2009, 31 May – 10 June 2010, June 2011	Paul Dockery	Actor Dockery first appears as an usher at the bail hearing of Tracy Barlow (Kate Ford) for the murder of Charlie Stubbs (Bill Ward) in 2007, and again in 2008 when David Platt (Jack P. Shepherd) is sentenced for damaging property on a rampage of the street. He is promoted to the role of clerk from 2009 when he's present as Tony Gordon (Gray O'Brien) is charged with murder, and appears again in 2010 at the trial of Gail McIntyre (Helen Worth) for her part in her husband Joe McIntyre's (Reece Dinsdale) death.
Pat Stanway	15 June – 30 July	Sean Hughes	A short-lived love interest of Eileen Grimshaw (Sue Cleaver). Pat was a customer of Streetcars and was talking to Eileen on the phone in a flirtatious way.
Luigi	1 July – 7 March 2008	Chris Hannon	An assistant chef at the all new Valandros restaurant, who instantly takes a dislike to boss Leanne Battersby (Jane Danson) whom he sees as inexperienced. He leaves after fellow employee Paul Clayton (Lee Booth) sets the restaurant alight in an insurance scam.
Ivor Priestley	8 August – 2 December	Paul Copley	Two of Angela Hawthorne's (Diane Fletcher) ex-husbands who made friends with one of her other ex-husbands, Norris Cole (Malcolm Hebden) at her funeral. Ivor and George both soon worked together to try and discover who Norris's love interest was, after receiving a declined proposal from business partner Rita (Barbara Knox), Norris went on to propose to Rita's friend Doreen Fenwick (Barbara Young), only to discover that he and George had already done so too, after Norris declined his offer of marriage, Doreen declined both Ivor and George's proposals, stating that she had changed her mind about getting married.
George Trench	8 August – 2 December	Keith Barron	
Frank Nicholls	19 August – 3 October	Keith Clifford	An elderly man who is first introduced when Cilla Battersby-Brown (Wendi Peters) gets a job at his care home. When Cilla discovers he has money she begins flirting with him, and he invites her to become his full-time carer. Frank is found by Cilla dead in his chair
Lindsey Gordon	26 November – 3 December	Susie Amy	The ex-wife of businessman Tony Gordon (Gray O'Brien) who first appears when she comes to the factory and slaps Carla Connor (Alison King), warning her to stay away from her husband. She also tells Carla that Tony is a womaniser and a control freak. Tony tells Carla to ignore Lindsey, who he describes as "crazy". When Liam Connor (Rob James-Collier) tries to dig up Tony's past, he turns to Lindsey for information. Lindsey continues to rant that Tony is a control freak, but claims they are both still in love and that Tony will return to her. Liam tries to tell Carla this, but Carla does not listen.
Phil Hardwick	28 November – 22 May 2009	Richard Sargent	Ryan Connor's (Ben Thompson) wheel-chair bound best friend, who he later forms a band with.
