= Lloyd Mullaney =

Fictional character from Coronation Street

- Coronation Street character
- Portrayed by: Craig Charles
- Duration: 2005–2015
- First appearance: 20 June 2005
- Last appearance: 25 September 2015
- Introduced by: Tony Wood
- Spin-off appearances: StreetCar Stories (2014)
In-universe information
- Occupation: Taxi firm owner
- Daughters: Jenna Kamara
- Grandmothers: Dolly
- Aunts: Sheila
- First cousins: Grace

Lloyd Mullaney is a fictional character from the British ITV soap opera Coronation Street, played by Craig Charles. He made his first on-screen appearance on 20 June 2005. The character departed on 23 July 2006, while Charles was suspended from work. He returned on 12 February 2007. Charles took a temporary break from the show in autumn 2011 to film new episodes of Red Dwarf, with Lloyd departing on 15 December 2011. After a seven-month absence, Lloyd returned on 2 July 2012. Charles announced his departure from the show in May 2015. Charles' final scenes aired on 25 September 2015 after Lloyd departed for good after 10 years alongside his pregnant fiancée, Andrea Beckett (Hayley Tamaddon) when they left the street together to move to Jersey.

Lloyd's storylines have included: his comedy-duo act with best friend Steve McDonald (Simon Gregson) and running taxi firm StreetCars with him; relationships with Kelly Crabtree (Tupele Dorgu), Cheryl Gray (Holly Quin-Ankrah) and Liz McDonald (Beverley Callard); discovering Cheryl's affair with her ex-husband Chris (Will Thorp); and an engagement with Andrea, which struggled when he discovered she was secretly married, and ended temporarily when Andrea stole a rare 7" record (worth £1,000) to help her daughter.

== Casting and development ==
The show's producers created the role of Lloyd for Craig Charles to portray. In 2008, it was announced that producers had signed Charles up for a special three-year contract.

On 28 May 2011, it was announced Charles would be leaving Coronation Street for a few months in order to film new episodes of Red Dwarf. Laura Armstrong of The People reported Charles would return to the show in 2012. Lloyd made his departure on screen on 15 December 2011. In May 2012, Digital Spy's Tom Eames reported Charles had started filming his comeback episodes for Coronation Street. The following month Charles confirmed that he would be staying with the soap for the foreseeable future and had just signed another contract extension. Charles returned on 2 July.

On 10 July 2012, Digital Spy's Paul Millar reported Lloyd would discover that he has a daughter. Millar stated that Charles may have teased the upcoming storyline when he appeared on This Morning, saying "There's going to be something really iconic for Coronation Street happening to Lloyd. So I'll leave that as a little teaser!" The show's producers began casting two actresses to play Lloyd's daughter and his ex-girlfriend. A spokesperson commented that Lloyd has not been contact with the ex-girlfriend for a while and then she turns up and announces that they have a daughter together. They added "The news will knock Lloyd for six. His reaction will be pretty explosive." On 26 July, it was announced that Pamela Nomvete and Krissi Bohn had joined the cast as Mandy and Jenna Kamara respectively. Mandy is Lloyd's ex-girlfriend, while Jenna is his daughter. A writer for itv.com stated "A long-dead affair is rekindled and secrets and lies come spilling out as Lloyd, his ex Mandy and their daughter Jenna, struggle to come to terms with the secret Mandy has carried for over 20 years." Series producer Phil Collinson commented that the storyline created an instant "new" family for Lloyd.

== Storylines ==
Lloyd gets a month's trial as a taxi driver at StreetCars and later buys Dev Alahan's (Jimmi Harkishin) share of the business and moves into the flat upstairs. He then forms an attraction to Kelly Crabtree (Tupele Dorgu) and they begin dating. Lloyd rescues Steve McDonald (Simon Gregson) and new employee Ronnie Clayton fend off Ronnie's ex-husband, Jimmy when he comes after them with a shotgun. When Kelly suspects Lloyd of cheating on her, she spikes his beer with laxatives, which have him hospitalised. Lloyd later explains that he owes his ex-girlfriend Tina £10,000 she loaned him in order to buy into StreetCars. They move into together but Kelly's friend, Becky Granger proves to be a problem when they let her stay. Becky's behaviour threatens to drive Lloyd and Kelly apart by playing games and even going as far to frame Kelly, but in the end Lloyd evicts Becky. In spite of this, Kelly refuses to accept Lloyd's apology. After Steve confesses to sleeping with Kelly on the night Ronnie ran over a pedestrian, Lloyd is angry with the pair of them and this rift almost dissolves Streetcars.

However, after some time off, Lloyd returns and forgives Steve, but not Kelly. They resume their friendship and move on from the past. Following his relationship with Kelly, Lloyd takes an interest in Jodie Morton (Samantha Seager). However, Jodie is under constant pressure to help run the family business and look after her younger siblings Kayleigh (Jessica Barden) and Finlay (Ramone Quinn). She later moves to London, ending any possibility of a relationship.

When Jodie's father, Jerry (Michael Starke) has a heart attack, Lloyd helps him and his family while he is in hospital. When Jerry's ex-wife Teresa Bryant (Karen Henthorn) arrives on the street on hearing about Jerry's plight, it is revealed that she and Lloyd had once had a fling. Teresa takes advantage of this—as well as Finlay's fondness of Lloyd—to con Lloyd into believing he is Finlay's biological father. Lloyd believes her and trying to do the decent thing, offers money to help look after him that she pocketed herself. Teresa's con is eventually revealed when WPC Mel (Emma Edmondson), Finlay's older half-sister gets suspicious and it is revealed that Finlay is not Lloyd's son.

After Steve has a one-night stand with Becky, Steve's girlfriend Michelle Connor (Kym Marsh) becomes suspicious when Steve and Lloyd's behaviour seems strange. Steve flees abroad to see his brother Andy (Nicholas Cochrane), so Michelle bullies Lloyd to tell her what is going on. He lies several times and Michelle discovers that he has been sleeping with someone else. Steve stays away from Michelle but Lloyd convinces Michelle that Steve is planning to propose. Michelle tells her brother Liam Connor (Rob James-Collier) and his wife Maria Connor (Samia Longchambon), but Lloyd tells her to keep quiet when Steve returns from Spain. Lloyd then tells Michelle the truth, not knowing that Steve has proposed. Lloyd often helps bookmaker Harry Mason (Jack Ellis) and his wife Clarissa (Alexandra Boyd) when they live on the street.

Lloyd begins attending Brazilian crunch classes with Steve's mother Liz McDonald (Beverley Callard) in an attempt to lose weight, after he enters a bet with Steve, instigated by Eileen Grimshaw (Sue Cleaver). Lloyd is initially reluctant but gives it a try and becomes popular with the ladies due to his looks, personality and DJ-ing skills. When Lloyd returns with Liz later that evening and insists on going home due to the pain, Liz's face shows she has feelings for him and is distressed to see him share a kiss under the mistletoe with Poppy Morales (Sophiya Haque), a new member of staff at The Rovers. Lloyd and Liz kiss in private during a dance evening at the Brazilian crunch classes. Upon returning to The Rovers, Lloyd brushes off Danielle and goes to the back yard to meet Liz. The two declare their feelings for one another, share another kiss and secretly sleep together, while Steve is working behind the bar. Lloyd's friendship with Steve suffers when Steve finds out about Lloyd and Liz. Liz and Lloyd break up when he cheats on her with Teresa.

Following his breakup with Liz, Lloyd expresses an interest in Cheryl Gray (Holly Quin-Ankrah), a friend of Leanne Battersby's (Jane Danson). Lloyd pursues Cheryl, although she resists his advances. Lloyd later discovers that Cheryl works in a strip club. He later also discovers that she is married, and has a son called Russ Gray (Finton Flynn). Lloyd attacks the strip club owner after he sees Cheryl with a black eye, causing Cheryl to lose her job. She then drops the bombshell that it is her husband Chris Gray (Will Thorp), and so Lloyd offers to let her live with him.

In December 2010, Lloyd is celebrating Peter Barlow's (Chris Gascoyne) stag night in The Joinery, when a fight erupts between him and Chris after he provokes him several times during the evening. The fight intensifies before a huge explosion ends the fight and tears through The Joinery. Lloyd, however, escapes relatively unhurt and even rescues his enemy, Chris. Lloyd kicks down the front door of number 13 only to be blasted back by huge flames. He still manages to save Josh and Freddie Peacock from the inferno along with Russ. Lloyd is left heartbroken when Chris and Cheryl tell him that they are back together. Lloyd throws Chris, Russ and Cheryl out of his house and tells Cheryl he never wants to see her again. Steve speaks to him and tells him that he should not let them get to him and that if they annoy him, then they have won. The conversation helps Lloyd see sense, and he tells Steve that he is grateful for helping him cope through the confession. Lloyd struggles to cope with losing Cheryl and Russ and at one point he grabs Karl Munro (John Michie) by the throat when he jokes about Cheryl. Lloyd sets fire to his sofa in the street as Cheryl and Chris watch. Lloyd and Chris have a fight and Chris hits his head, Cheryl learns he has been lying about his tumour and decides to leave with Russ.

Stella Price (Michelle Collins) helps Lloyd with his taxes and one evening, he misinterprets her concern and tries to kiss her. Stella knocks him back and Lloyd apologises. Lloyd tells Karl about the kiss and subsequently decides to leave Weatherfield and he sells his share of Street Cars to Becky, before departing. Lloyd later sells his house to Steve. Lloyd returns and runs into Steve, who offers him a job and somewhere to live. Lloyd thinks he is being offered half of StreetCars, but Steve reveals that he was just offering him a driving job. Lloyd then sets up a rival taxi firm called Fare Ladies and begins poaching Steve's clients and staff. Lloyd hires Tracy Barlow (Kate Ford), but fires her after he realises she has been sabotaging his cars. Lloyd makes up with Steve and starts working for Street Cars again under the basis that they do not mention their earlier arguments. Lloyd becomes enemies with Karl, after he cheats on Stella with Sunita Alahan (Shobna Gulati). Lloyd fires Karl and refuses to acknowledge his existence, but Karl warns him that he will get him back.

In September 2012, Lloyd has a chance encounter at a gig with an old friend, Mandy Kamara (Pamela Nomvete). They get talking and Mandy reveals that her husband, Johnny (also a good friend of Lloyd's) has recently died and she has moved to Manchester. Lloyd is keen for them to meet up again, but Mandy declines and asks that Lloyd does not contact her again. He tries to make her acquaintance again by returning a necklace she left in the back of his cab but is startled when she is cold towards him. He once again tries goes to her house, but this time the door is answered by a young woman Lloyd does not recognise. After further attempts to contact Mandy, he finds out that this is her daughter Jenna (Krissi Bohn). Realising from Mandy's attitude towards him, Lloyd works out that Jenna must be his daughter, Lloyd finally confronts Mandy, and it is revealed that she planned to leave her husband for Lloyd many years ago, but her pregnancy kept them together, Lloyd moved away, and Johnny never found out about the affair. When Jenna finds out, she is angry at her mother, who then plans to move back to Nottingham. Lloyd however convinces her to reconcile with Jenna, and move in with him. She grudgingly accepts, but soon warms to Lloyd once again. When Jenna loses her job as a physiotherapist after one of her patients, Sophie Webster (Brooke Vincent) kisses her, and she does not report it, Lloyd supports her, while Mandy despairs over the career she worked so hard for, now over. Lloyd defends Jenna's choices however, and she makes up with Mandy after coming out as a lesbian, and entering a permanent relationship with Sophie.

In July 2013, Lloyd and his family enter the pub and overhear Paul Kershaw (Tony Hirst) make a possibly racist comment whilst playing darts. This causes a rift between Lloyd's family and Paul but Paul's partner, Eileen Grimshaw, is trapped between the two as Lloyd is her colleague and one of her best friends. The argument between the two sides continue, with Eileen determined to end the feud. Sophie, who is involved with Jenna, contacts the fire service where Paul works and makes a formal complaint about his racist remark. Paul finds this out via his manager and believes Lloyd made the complaint as an act of revenge, trying to get him sacked from his job. He subsequently finds Lloyd near the pub, pins him up against the wall and hits him. Jenna is walking across the street and noticed and she subsequently tells Paul that it was Sophie who made the complaint. However, the police are present as they had been called by Nick Tilsley (Ben Price) to investigate problems at his bar. Nick's wife, Leanne, tells the police they are not needed, so they divert their attention to Paul and Lloyd and they take Paul down to the station for questioning due to his violent behaviour. Finally, Paul gives in and apologises to Lloyd, but there is still tension between the two. Mandy and Lloyd's relationship is almost as shaken by Eileen and Paul's. Events escalate and Lloyd and Mandy split.

Paul has another encounter with Lloyd when Eileen convinces him and Steve to go out to a bar with Paul for his birthday. They are joined by Brian Packham (Peter Gunn), who seeks to lighten the mood, but the conversation soon turns to Lloyd and Paul. Steve and Brian leave soon after Paul and Lloyd stop talking to each other. Paul goes after them, leaving Lloyd to one last drink. He notices a gang of three men, all pale-skinned, observing him. He begins to chat up the barmaid, who is brown skinned. He invites her out, but then decides to abandon his drink and leave after he sees the unwelcome attention they are attracting. He bumps into Paul, who has come back for him, on the way out, but while distracted, he is surrounded by the men from the pub, who seek to rough him up. Paul intervenes, and one of the men "questions his allegiances". Paul ignores this, and tells them to back off. They return to the bar, and Paul and Lloyd begin to walk home. Paul apologises to Lloyd, but Lloyd, believing Paul's language instigated the encounter, shuns him, returning home alone. Later, when Paul leaves the street for good, Lloyd and Steve comfort Eileen, to no avail.

Lloyd later begins a relationship with Andrea Beckett (Hayley Tamaddon), a friend of Steve's from college. Steve is jealous, despite him being in a relationship with Michelle. Andrea later admits to Lloyd that she used to fancy Steve, but she now loves Lloyd and after many meals at the Bistro, Lloyd forgives Andrea and they reunite. Lloyd and Steve compete in a charity fun-run in memory of Hayley Cropper (Julie Hesmondhalgh). Steve accidentally trips Lloyd up, but Lloyd accuses him of doing it on purpose to beat him. Steve gets to the finish line first, but when Lloyd arrives, he collapses and suffers a heart attack with the concerned competitors watching in horror. Lloyd is rushed to hospital, where the doctors reveal that he has definitely suffered a heart attack. Andrea is nowhere to be seen, which makes Jenna and Eileen suspicious. He later finds out that Andrea is married however stays with her, when she says she is divorcing her husband, Neil. He tries to win her back but she decides to stay with Lloyd. Jenna however is furious and shows hatred towards Andrea, they soon though begin a better friendship before Jenna decides to leave. Lloyd tries to stop her but lets her go eventually and they part on good terms and he is glad that he met her.

A few months later, Andrea and Lloyd break up when she sells one of his records to get money for her daughter. She leaves, but returns later and reveals that she is pregnant. Lloyd reunites with Liz, but calls it off when he finds out about Andrea's pregnancy. Liz and Lloyd remain friends. Andrea tells him that she has been offered a job in Jersey and he has a drunken farewell with Steve before saying goodbye to Eileen. Lloyd and Andrea let go of balloons from Coronation Street as everybody cheers and the car drives off. Lloyd and Andrea return a few days later to say goodbye with Steve and share one final hug. In May 2016, Lloyd rang Steve to break the news that Andrea gave birth to a baby girl.

== Reception ==
Following Craig Charles's temporary suspension from the show for drug abuse in 2006, The Guardian columnist Grace Dent spoke positively of the character and her hopes for his eventual return: "Love or hate Craig Charles, I thought he was brilliant in Corrie. From the moment Lloyd arrived, he was a breath of fresh air; the perfect foil to Steve McDonald, a friendly face for cab controller Eileen to while away long shifts with, a voice of common sense. Craig, get a grip and come back soon." Marianna Manson from Closer Online put Lloyd on her list of the 11 most iconic black characters in British soap operas and opined that he had "major Original Cast Member energy". A writer from ITVX put Lloyd on their list of Liz McDonald's (Beverley Callard) top ten lovers and noted how Steve (Simon Gregson) was "horrified" when he learned of their initial fling.
