= Vernon Tomlin =

Fictional character from Coronation Street

- Coronation Street character
- Portrayed by: Ian Reddington
- Duration: 2005–2008
- First appearance: Episode 6175; 2 December 2005
- Last appearance: Episode 6910; 22 September 2008
In-universe information
- Occupation: Musician; Pub assistant
- Wife: Liz McDonald (2007–2009)
- Stepsons: Steve McDonald; Andy McDonald

Vernon Tomlin is a fictional character from the British ITV soap opera Coronation Street, played by Ian Reddington. He appeared from December 2005 until September 2008, when the character was written out of the series. The character was the second husband of Liz McDonald, played by Beverley Callard.

== Storylines ==
A band musician, Vernon began a relationship with Liz McDonald. However, she dumped him after he made a pass at new barmaid Michelle Connor (Kym Marsh). He then became the new potman and cellarman, although he is shamelessly work-shy and often looks for excuses not to work. He proposed to Liz in 2007, unaware that she was enjoying a fling with brewery delivery man Derek, until Derek confessed all on 15 July that same year. Vernon was prepared to leave Weatherfield, but returned after Liz made a Motown compilation tape which she gave to Lloyd Mullaney to play in his taxi en route to the airport.

Vernon eventually relented and returned to Liz. The couple were due to tie the knot in a special New Years episode which was complicated by Jim McDonald's return, when Jim, having had everyone think that he'd turned over a new leaf, savagely beat Vernon up at the back of the Rovers, and also hitting Bob, the keyboard player with the band. Steve jumped in and stopped Jim from giving him a worse beating, and seeing as his father had not changed, sent him away for good. A battered and bloodied Vernon finally married Liz at the Register office on New Year's Eve 2007.

In 2008, Vernon and Liz returned happily married, and Vernon, having already overseen the redecoration of the Rovers Return, was planning his next project. In March 2008, Vernon came up with the idea of a smoking shelter; an area at the back of the Rovers for people to smoke in following the introduction of the smoking ban the previous July. He recruited two of his friends, musicians/builders, Vince and Don, to work on it, although Liz was not happy when they did more slacking than working, and then left the shelter unfinished when they got a cruise ship gig. Several weeks later, Vernon discovered Vince and Don needed a drummer for the gig and managed to get a ticket for Liz. However, Liz decided she could not leave The Rovers and Vernon went alone. Liz privately admitted to Deirdre she had made a mistake marrying Vernon.

In June 2008, Liz and Vernon separated after Liz got cold feet about purchasing a nightclub and their marriage. Vernon then moved out of the Rovers and was offered a spare room in Lloyd's flat above Street Cars. After seeing Roy Cropper short-staffed at Roy's Rolls, Vernon offered to help him out. Liz and Vernon then decided to just be friends. At the start of September 2008, Vernon tried to woo Liz back by singing her a song, (Don't Fall Into) The Mason's Arms, alluding to Liz and Harry Mason's near-fling. Media website Digital Spy branded the song the character sang as a 'stroke of genius'.

In September 2008, Vernon discovered that a record label were interested in his song. However, his happiness was short-lived after he saw Liz and Harry in a passionate clinch in the back room of the Rovers, dashing all hopes of a reconciliation. On the following day, 22 September, Vernon decided to leave Weatherfield for London. He made several more attempts to convince Liz to go with him, however, she was more interested in a planned date with Harry Mason that evening. Eventually, Vernon left Liz a note telling her he would park his van at the end of the street at 8pm and stay there until 8:20pm. Liz had Deirdre read the note to her and was then let down by Harry who took wife Clarissa out instead. At 8:20, Vernon said a final goodbye to Lloyd, with his parting words of wisdom "Fate Decides", and drove out of Weatherfield, Liz was too late to catch him. The character left the show in September 2008; Vernon's divorce from Liz was finalized off-screen in June 2009.

== Reception ==
A writer from ITVX put Vernon on their list of Liz' top ten lovers and called him a "rock'n'roll drummer".
