= Rodney Litchfield =

English actor (1939–2020)

- Born: 3 February 1939; Wigan, Lancashire, England
- Died: 5 September 2020 (aged 81); England
- Occupation: Actor
- Years active: 1983–2013
- Known for: Coronation Street; Early Doors

Rodney Litchfield (3 February 1939 – 5 September 2020) was an actor known for Early Doors (2003), Sunshine (2008) and Grow Your Own (2007).

== Career ==
Litchfield's first television appearances were in the 1980s, the first of which was the episode First Leg of the British drama Travelling Man.

He also made brief appearances in Juliet Bravo, A Touch of Frost, Cracker, Hetty Wainthropp Investigates, Heartbeat, and Peter Kay's Phoenix Nights.

Litchfield's best remembered television appearances were in Phil Mealey's and Craig Cash's dry-humoured sitcom Early Doors, which starred Litchfield as Tommy, a miserable pensioner who sits in the corner of the pub attempting to avoid social interaction with the rest of the pub's regulars, including avoiding accepting free drinks from anyone in case he is coerced into buying a 'round'.

After starring in the sitcom's only two series, he was seen driving a van onto the cobbles of Coronation Street as character Wilfred Morton with granddaughter Jodie (played by Samantha Seager) who were renovating the old Bakery owned by Diggory Compton into a takeaway. Michael Starke played Litchfield's son Jerry Morton. Coincidentally, both Litchfield and Starke had appeared on Channel 4 soap, Brookside.

Litchfield died on 5 September 2020, at the age of 81.

== Filmography ==
Year	Title	Role	Notes
1984	Brookside	Andrew Dunn	Episode #152
1984	Travelling Man	Second Warder	Episode: "First Leg"
1985	Seaview	Jack	Episode: "Big Brother"
1985	Juliet Bravo	Armourer	Episode: "Hostage to Fortune"
1986	Help	Policeman	Episode: "Missing Presumed"...
1986	Knights & Emeralds	Kevin's Dad	Film
1987, 1996	Emmerdale	Soldier / Scrapman	3 episodes
1987	Knights of God	Chapel Knight	Season 1, episode 1
1988	Coronation Street	Chaz Ferguson	Episode #2859
1988	Testimony	Sherlock Holmes	Film
1990	Dancin' Thru the Dark	Old Customer	Film
1990	All Creatures Great and Small	Tom Randall	Episode: "The Prodigal Returns"
1993	Stay Lucky	Burrows	Episode: "Flameproof and Free"
1993	Last of the Summer Wine	2nd Policeman	Episode: "Have You Got a Light Mate?"
1994	A Touch of Frost	Norman	Episode: "A Minority of One"
1994	All Quiet on the Preston Front	Harry the Chip	Episode: "Ally's Husband"
1994	Seaforth	Marshall	2 episodes
1995	Moving Story	Eccles	Episode: "Norman Blood"
1995	Cracker	Taxi Driver	Episode: "Brotherly Love: Part 1"
1995	Heartbeat	Jenkins	Episode: "Saint Columba's Treasure"
1996	Hetty Wainthropp Investigates	Taxi Driver	Episode: "Widdershins"
2001	Peter Kay's Phoenix Nights	Wild Bill	Episode: "Wild West Night"
2001	Vacuuming Completely Nude in Paradise	Throat	TV film
2002	Shipman	Remand Quiz Master	TV film
2003–2004	Early Doors	Tommy	Main role, All 12 episodes
2003	Casualty	Bruce	Episode: "Christmas Spirit"
2004	No Angels	Mr. Latchford	Season 1, episode 1
2004	Nits	Mr. Morietti	Short story
2004	The Bill	Joseph Clark	Episode: "2211: Smoking Demons"
2004	Doctors	Jack Bletchley	Episode: "Sticks and Stones"
2005	Dead Man Weds	Harry	Season 1, episode 3
2005, 2009	Shameless	Magistrate / Algie	3 episodes
2005	Pierrepoint	Sellers	Film
2006	The Street	Tony	Episode: "Asylum"
2007	Coronation Street	Wilf Morton	Recurring role, 22 episodes
2007	Grow Your Own	Terry	Film
2008	Sunshine	Tommy Todd	All 3 episodes
2010	Labrats	Man with Dog	Video
2011	In with the Flynns	Toy Shop Owner	Episode: "The Hardest Cut"
2011	My Family	Junior	2 episodes
2013	The Last British Execution	Arthur Hinchcliffe	Film
