= Amber Kalirai =

Fictional character from Coronation Street

- Coronation Street character
- Portrayed by: Nikki Patel
- Duration: 2005–2009, 2011–2012
- First appearance: 9 November 2005
- Last appearance: 23 March 2012
- Introduced by: Tony Wood (2005); Phil Collinson (2011)
In-universe information
- Occupation: Shop assistant Takeaway worker Student
- Father: Dev Alahan
- Mother: Ravinder Kalirai
- Stepmother: Sunita Alahan; Bernie Winter
- Half-brothers: Aadi Alahan
- Half-sisters: Shareen; Asha Alahan
- Grandfathers: Ranjiv Alahan
- Grandmothers: Urmila Alahan
- Other relatives: Aunty Rani

Amber Kalirai is a fictional character from the British ITV soap opera Coronation Street, played by Nikki Patel, the character first appeared on-screen during the episode airing on 9 November 2005. In May 2011 it was announced that Patel had returned to filming and Amber appeared again from 11 July 2011. Patel made her final appearance as Amber on 23 March 2012.

== Casting ==
Nikki Patel was cast in the role. In May 2011 it was announced that Patel had returned to filming with the serial. Amber is a streetwise and sassy character who is not afraid to speak her mind. ITV Publicity goes on to confirm this by describing the character of Amber as: "She is an intelligent, friendly, outgoing chatterbox who loves sharing gossip with Norris Cole. She’s sassy and streetwise too." What's on TV magazine describe Amber as: "Open and honest and always speaks her mind - even if it's uncomfortable hearing! She loves to gossip and is able to indulge her passion with equally nosy shopkeeper Norris."

== Development ==
Nikki Patel (pictured) played Amber.

Amber later began dating Darryl Morton (Jonathan Dixon), which is her first real relationship, although the pair faced many obstacles within their first few weeks of dating. Darryl later moved in with Amber and her father Dev, after becoming homeless when his father Jerry rented 6 Coronation Street out to the Windass family. Due to his pairing with Amber, his character was given a reprieve so they could carry their on-screen romance after originally being axed with the rest of the Morton family.

The character of Amber became central to storylines during 2008 and Patel impressed bosses with her performance, and she was awarded with an onscreen relationship and friends; the first being Minnie Chandra who was portrayed by Poppy Jhakra. A spokesperson from the soap opera said: We've been extremely pleased with Nikki Patel's performance as Amber, so we thought it was about time to explore her friends on the Street. Minnie will play a part in the development of Amber's relationship with Darryl and Dev's relationship with Tara."

On 19 February 2012, Colin Daniels of Digital Spy reported that Patel would be leaving the show. Daniels said the actress had already filmed her final scenes as Amber and she would make her last on-screen appearance the following month. Amber leaves Coronation Street following a series of rows with her stepmother, Sunita Alahan (Shobna Gulati). A show spokesperson said "Nikki will be leaving us at the end of her contract, but viewers may see Amber again." Her departure aired on 23 March 2012.

== Storylines ==
Amber Kalirai is the previously-unknown daughter, of Dev Alahan (Jimmi Harkishin). She first appears in November 2005, when her mother, Ravinder, is taken into hospital and she is looked after by her dad and his wife, Sunita Alahan (Shobna Gulati) on the Street. Amber starts helping out in the Corner Shop, but her incessant chat winds Dev up. Initially, Dev does not want Amber in his life as he is married to Sunita at the time, and Amber serves as a reminder of his philandering ways. However, he warms to her, and she comes to live with him, after her mother Ravinder moves to Finland with her partner. She has a crush on fellow neighbour, David Platt (Jack P. Shepherd), but he is initially unaware of her feelings. When he does confront her, she denies it.

In early 2008, Amber begins working at the restaurant, Valandros, with Leanne Battersby (Jane Danson), Paul Clayton (Tom Hudson) and Luigi until it is set alight by Paul. Dev then claims, that he does not want her anywhere near Paul. Amber is infatuated by David, after he tries to make his ex-girlfriend Tina McIntyre (Michelle Keegan) jealous, first by letting Amber use one of his tickets to a gig, which Tina refused. In August 2008, David invites Amber around to his house for lunch, in a deliberate attempt to annoy Tina. Amber, is unaware that she was being used, and kisses David. Unable to contain her anger any longer, Tina storms around to the house demanding to know why David is playing these games, this interruption leaves Amber feeling humiliated. She breaks up with her boyfriend Darryl Morton (Jonathan Dixon), when she finds out he is going to leave her after her Dev pays him, although he changes his mind. She leaves Weatherfield to attend a university in London, with her friend Mitch (Marcquelle Ward).

Mitch is a college friend of Amber's. In September 2009, Mitch, Amber and Darryl are invited to a party. Mitch meets the couple in Victoria Street, having booked a cab from StreetCars and excitedly tells the pair that he cannot wait to go to London, as he will be able to purchase an Oyster card, and use the underground instead of shelling out for taxis. Darryl finds out that Mitch plans to attend the same University as Amber, and instructs Mitch to go and double-check the booking, as he demands Amber to explain. Amber accuses him of over-reacting and brushes the matter to the side, which leads them to argue, and Darryl concludes that Amber fancies Mitch and Darryl refuses to attend the party.

She returns nearly two years later and stays with Dev, much to Sunita's (Shobna Gulati) reluctance. She soon starts catching up with old acquaintances, such as David and Sean Tully (Antony Cotton) and helps Sophie Webster (Brooke Vincent) get her job back at her father's shop. She also reveals to Sophie that she was kicked out of university, and gives Sophie tips on how to get back on Kevin Webster's (Michael Le Vell) good side. Amber then has a night out, with Tommy Duckworth (Chris Fountain) and arrives home early next morning. Sunita agrees not to tell Dev about her staying out all night, but Sunita does tell Dev, and Amber reveals she has been kicked out of university.

Tommy and Amber go on a date, but Tommy tells her he has to leave, as his friend Tyrone Dobbs (Alan Halsall) is in hospital, but instead he goes on a date with Tina, and Amber walks in on them on a date, and is furious. In October 2011, Amber takes Sophie to a lesbian bar, where Amber gets a girl's phone number but tells Sophie she will not be calling back as she is not a lesbian.

Sophie's girlfriend, Sian Powers (Sacha Parkinson), is in France with her mother, and Amber takes this as an opportunity to take Sophie out. She takes her to a bar where a boy chats up Sophie, and as an act to "get the guy to leave her alone", Amber kisses Sophie, and claims to be her girlfriend. Sophie, is shocked asks Amber what she is playing at, but is not too bothered, as Amber spiked her drink earlier. The next day Sophie calls in sick at Dev's corner shop, feeling terrible after Amber spiking her drink, and partly trying to avoid Amber. Sophie then confides in Sunita, and asks what to do with the guilt of developing feelings for Amber. Sophie then proposes to Sian, and Sian accepts.

Amber receives a car from Dev, for her 21st birthday. Dev wants to take Sunita out for a meal and asks Amber to babysit, but Amber says that she is going to a party. Dev refuses to cancel, so Sunita reluctantly agrees for a meal. However, when they come back, they see Amber having an argument with Tyrone, Fiz Stape (Jennie McAlpine), Chesney Brown (Sam Aston), because she is having a party in the house. Sunita shouts at Amber, and Amber threatens to leave the next day. Dev tries to reason with Amber, who says that she won't go, if Sunita apologises. However, Sunita refuses to and Amber goes packs her bags. Amber tells Dev that she is staying at a friend's house. Amber gets a job in London, and Dev stays with her for a few months after Sunita's affair with Karl Munro (John Michie), is exposed. Amber is unable to attend Sunita's funeral as she is travelling with her boyfriend.

== Reception ==
In 2006 actress Nikki Patel was nominated as Best Newcomer at the National Television Awards. Ian Wylie on Manchester Evening News stated that Nikki Patel has shone in the portrayal of the determined school girl Amber and also went on to say that he thought she should have won an NTA for her portrayal of the character. Kate White from Inside Soap ran a feature on what Christmas presents she would give to soap characters. White said she would buy Amber a "big spoon" so she could stir up trouble for her neighbours. White believed that Amber did a great job of making Sophie and Sian's "terribly twee romance much more exciting". Jane Simon from the Daily Mirror wrote "Shame." in reference to Amber's 2012 departure.
