= Eileen Grimshaw =

Fictional character from Coronation Street

- Coronation Street character
- Portrayed by: Sue Cleaver
- Duration: 2000–2025
- First appearance: Episode 4815; 3 May 2000
- Last appearance: Episode 11590; 6 June 2025
- Introduced by: Jane MacNaught
- Book appearances: Coronation Street: The Complete Saga (2008)
- Crossover appearances: East Street (2010)
In-universe information
- Other names: Eileen Phelan
- Occupation: Switch operator
- Father: Colin Grimshaw
- Half-sisters: Julie Carp
- Husband: Pat Phelan (2017–2018)
- Sons: Jason Grimshaw; Todd Grimshaw
- Stepdaughters: Nicola Rubinstein
- Grandsons: Billy Platt
- Other relatives: Elsie Tanner; Linda Cheveski; Dennis Tanner; Paul Cheveski

Eileen Grimshaw (also Phelan) is a fictional character from the British ITV soap opera Coronation Street. Played by Sue Cleaver, the character first appeared on-screen during the episode airing on 3 May 2000. Her storylines have often included her relationships with Dennis Stringer (Charles Dale), Ed Jackson (Chris Walker), Pat Stanaway (Sean Hughes), Jerry Morton (Michael Starke), Jesse Chadwick (John Thomson), Paul Kershaw (Tony Hirst), Adrian Mortimer (Mark Moraghan) and Michael Rodwell (Les Dennis), as well as her marriage to serial criminal mastermind Pat Phelan (Connor McIntyre).

The character also appeared in the mini-episode crossover between Coronation Street and rival soap EastEnders entitled East Street screened on 19 November 2010 in aid of children's charity Children In Need. In 2011, it was revealed that she and half-sister Julie Carp (Katy Cavanagh) were related to former Coronation Street character, Elsie Tanner (Pat Phoenix), as Elsie's first cousin, Arnley Grimshaw, was their paternal grandfather. In 2018, Cleaver took a temporary break from the show. Cleaver decided to leave Coronation Street after twenty-five years and Eileen departed the show on 6 June 2025.

== Development ==
=== Personality ===
Eileen has been described as "a down-to-earth, pragmatic type of character". Sue Cleaver has expressed how much she likes the variation in Eileen's development, with storylines ranging from "comic capers" to "serious": "I lurch between the light-hearted and serious. There's been lots of heavy drama stuff with [Eileen's sons] Todd and Jason. So it's really nice to have the relief of the scenes in the taxi office, [Eileen's workplace], where it's more upbeat. I get to play the whole spectrum, which is fun [...] As an actor, you do not often get an opportunity to keep building on your character and finding new aspects to them. If you're doing a film or TV series, it's over in three months, whereas in something long-running, I can really understand my character and know them inside out like another human being. The challenge is to delve a little bit deeper into Eileen's psyche, which I really enjoy doing."

Cleaver has stated that there are similarities between her own personality and Eileen's: "On a soap, you can't come in and create a character that's very far removed from yourself, because it's such a lot of work, so of course there are elements to Eileen that I've brought in. But I think we're very different. She's more generous than I am quite frankly!" She has added, "I think Eileen is happy. She's a very together person [...] She's got a very realistic view [...] I think there are a lot of women who would aspire to be like her, how she holds everything together and juggles her job, the kids and everyone else's problems."

=== Friends and enemies ===
The character has been involved in various feuds since her introduction in 2000. Eileen's most prominent and long-running feud has been with Gail Platt, played by Helen Worth. The characters have a long history of catfights and insults between them, animosity that stems from the acrimonious break-up of Eileen's son, Todd and Gail's daughter, Sarah. In one scene, Gail flings herself at Eileen after being soundly slapped and told to "Go home, Gail!" Despite this, various things, including the 2010 tram crash, have caused them to put aside their differences. Cleaver has commented, "Eileen's relationship with Gail is horrendous [...] I love all the scraps in the street with Gail. Helen Worth (who plays Gail) and I love doing all that – we have such a laugh with the abusive comments we make for each other. The constant battle is fun. It's a love-hate relationship." Worth has suggested that Gail probably thinks she is "a little better than Eileen" Jenny Platt, who played Violet Wilson between 2004 and 2008 has noted that "Gail's found her nemesis in Eileen, but it's so stupid because actually they are so similar. They are both single mums looking out for their kids."

Media critic Grace Dent has summarised the dislike that exists between the characters in a review in The Guardian in 2006: "Like most fine inter-family feuds, no one knows the true beginning, but it's safe to say that Coronation Street's Eileen Grimshaw and Gail Platt have hated each other for ages. Eileen sees Gail's daughter Sarah Lou as a giant, repugnant, mascara-clad Venus flytrap, suckering in baby-daddies for her illegitimate brat Bethany. Gail Platt thinks Eileen's kids Todd and Jason are scummy, duplicitous, gutter-dwellers and their mother a snivelling apologist for their catalogue of spite. When Eileen's son, Todd, dated Sarah-Lou, he passed up the chance to study at Oxford University [...] When eventually Eileen stopped fantasising about trapping Sarah-Lou's head in Fred Elliott's bacon slicer, Sarah-Lou had set her eye on Todd's half-brother Jason. Both Gail and Eileen took this news with deep umbrage. Eileen knew Jason could do much better than this drippy, yo-yo-knickered little strumpet. Meanwhile, Gail knew Sarah-Lou was worth more than that slack-jawed, apostolic follower of Charlie Stubbs."

One of Eileen's most enduring on-screen relationships has been her friendship with her boss Steve McDonald (Simon Gregson). Cleaver has said that she enjoys Eileen's "constant bickering with Steve". She has revealed that she and Gregson play jokes with the bookings diary on Eileen's desk during filming of the cab office, where both characters work: "We write comments about each other in it. When you see me scribbling in the book, think of the rudest things possible and they're in there". In 2007, both characters were featured in a special week of off-set episodes, filmed on location in Malta. The friends decide to take a trip together amid Steve's relationship problems with Michelle Connor. A Coronation Street spokesperson said: "We're excited about going out to film this storyline in Malta. Both Steve and Eileen's love lives are looking pretty bleak, so they decide to escape to the sunshine. It'll be great fun." Press rumours began to circulate about a possible romantic pairing between the characters; however, this proved to be a red herring, Eileen spends the night in bed with a drunken Steve to avoid sleeping in discomfort on the floor. During the episodes, some of Malta's historic streets and churches, landscapes and Gozo's red sand beach Ramla Bay were featured. It was predicted in the media that British tourism trade to Malta would significantly increase due to the screening of the episodes. When discussions about filming on the island began, UK-based site YourMalta.com commented, "it could be a major boost [...] A half hour episode on Malta will reach more people over a longer period of time than a tourist authority could hope to with a series of twenty or thirty second advertisements, it would be worth millions in equivalent advertising." Property website easier.com stated that "viewers have been captivated by the sun-soaked honey-coloured buildings, the charming historic streets and churches and beautiful landscapes not to mention the glorious red sand beach of Ramla Bay. It was hard not to be envious as Eileen and Steve sipped cocktails next to the pool in the gleaming sunshine and this lifestyle was all the more alluring when the camera's panned back to the dreary streets of Weatherfield."

=== Romances ===
Eileen's history includes numerous failed romances. Her first known screen partner was Dennis Stringer (Charles Dale), who left her in 2001 following an affair with her best friend at the time, Janice Battersby. Next, Eileen fell for Ed Jackson (Chris Walker) in 2006, before discovering he had served time in prison for killing Emily Bishop's husband Ernest in a storyline that screened in 1978. Commenting on Eileen's relationship with Ed, Sue Cleaver has said, "She'd have loved it to work with Ed but she knew it wouldn't while he was on a mission to absolve himself of his sins. It would be great if Chris came back. I loved working with him, and he really would like to come back."

It was announced in 2007 that comedian Sean Hughes would be joining Coronation Street as Pat, a love interest for Eileen. A source told Daily Mirror, "They meet in the [Rovers Return] and get on like a house on fire. It's not very long before they are enjoying steamy sessions. It's a great coup to have Sean play the role. It's a mixture of serious and comical. He and Sue have a good chemistry to make the story work really well". However, the relationship soured when Eileen discovered he was a serial womanizer. A romance with Jerry Morton fizzled out on-screen in 2008, when Eileen dumped him. Actor Michael Starke, who was axed from his role as Jerry Morton in 2008, has been critical about the way Eileen and Jerry's romance "died such an early death". In an interview, he commented, "There was even talk of babies! But it fizzled out – it went absolutely nowhere. It was never explained to me".

It has been noted that Eileen has "not had much luck in love", although Cleaver maintains that viewers should not feel sorry for her character, adding that Eileen is "very happy" and "together". She adds, "People forget that she's had proposals of marriage and turned them down."

=== Departure ===
On 4 January 2025, it was announced that Cleaver had decided to leave the role after twenty-five years on-screen. Cleaver released a statement revealing she chose to leave because she had become aged sixty and wanted to pursue other projects. Cleaver previously took a leave of absence in 2024, to appear in a theatre show. She then began discussing her planned permanent departure with producers, who used the advance notice to create "a strong exit storyline for her". Coronation Street's producer Kate Brooks stated that the company were "sad to bid farewell to the wonderful" Cleaver. She added for twenty-five years Eileen had "been at the heart of some of the most memorable and iconic Corrie storylines, and her onscreen rivalry with Gail Platt will undoubtedly go down in Corrie folklore. There's certainly no one quite like Eileen, and her character will be hugely missed on the Cobbles." Cleaver filmed her final scenes on 28 March 2025 and were broadcast on 6 June.

== Storylines ==
Eileen first appears on 3 May 2000. Vikram Desai (Chris Bisson) gives Eileen a ride in his cab and, impressed by her local knowledge, ends up employing her to operate the radio at his taxi firm, StreetCars, which he runs with Steve McDonald (Simon Gregson). She demands £5.50 an hour.

A feisty single mum, Eileen comes from a family of eight. She rents Steve's house and moves in with her teenage sons, Jason (Ryan Thomas) and Todd (Bruno Langley). In the early days, she does not approve of Jason's aspirations to be an athlete. A couple of years later, Todd comes out as gay.

Eileen has had many relationships since the character's introduction. Her relationship with biker Dennis Stringer (Charles Dale) ends when he admits he is in love with Janice Battersby (Vicky Entwistle), resulting in Eileen punching Janice. Following Jason and Candice Stowe (Nikki Sanderson) placing an ad for her in a lonely hearts column in a newspaper, she dates cleaner Harry Flagg (Iain Rogerson) but they decide to remain friends. She dates Ernest Bishop's killer, Ed Jackson (Chris Walker), despite disapproval from most of the Street. It is during this relationship with Ed, a born-again Christian, that Eileen comes to the conclusion that she is agnostic. In 2007, she meets Pat Stanaway (Sean Hughes), who she assumes is married and has an "affair". Pat is not married as he does not like serious relationships as he was dating six other women at the time. She dates kebab shop owner Jerry Morton (Michael Starke), but dumps him in 2008 after he begins taking more of an interest in his children rather than her.

One of Eileen's main feuds is with Gail Platt (Helen Worth) and they have had several fights in the street. The pair constantly spar whenever they cross paths. The feud begins when her son, Todd, moves in with Gail's daughter, Sarah (Tina O'Brien) as Eileen feels that Sarah, a single mother, is holding Todd back from achieving in life. This seems to be proved when Sarah falls pregnant, but the baby, a boy named Billy, died shortly after being born prematurely following a placental abruption. Todd's announcement that he is gay and having an affair with Karl Foster causes a catfight in the street. The two women are at loggerheads again when they are attracted to reflexologist Phil Nail (Clive Russell); Gail eventually wins his affections. This rivalry results in Eileen being the prime suspect when Gail is stalked by someone claiming to be her late husband, Richard Hillman (Brian Capron), in 2006. Eileen is cleared when David Platt (Jack P. Shepherd) is revealed as the true culprit. Eileen's son Jason married Gail's daughter Sarah in October 2007, and divorced in 2010.

On Christmas Day 2006, Eileen is surprised when a young woman drops a baby off, claiming that Jason is the father. Eileen takes responsibility for the little girl, whom they call Holly because she arrives during the Christmas period. Jason does not want her and tells Eileen that she is not his, but Eileen refuses to believe him, so Jason ends up calling Children's Services in desperation. He admits that he called them, but he is fond of baby Holly. However, Eileen is shocked in April 2007 when Holly's mother returns as she has realised that Charlie Stubbs (Bill Ward) is Holly's real father, after seeing his picture in the paper during Tracy Barlow's (Kate Ford) trial. She tells Eileen that he introduced himself as Jason Grimshaw and asks Eileen to give Holly back but Eileen refuses and throws her out, threatening to call the police. Knowing that Eileen has no legal claim to the woman's daughter, she calls Children's Services and they tell Eileen that they will be coming to collect Holly so Eileen decides to run away with her. Eileen's nemesis, Gail Platt, finds out and persuades her to return Holly to her mother. A tearful Eileen returns Holly in April 2007.

In December 2008, Eileen's father Colin (Edward DeSouza) arrives. He meets Peter Barlow (Chris Gascoyne) in the bookies and as he places a bet, Eileen phones him wanting to know where he is and he lies, claiming to be on the bus to Weatherfield. He was known for his betting and drinking and this causes a row when they meet.

In February 2009, Eileen is stunned to discover that an old school friend of hers, Paula Carp (Sharon Duce), left school early after falling pregnant at fourteen years old. When she learns that Street resident, Julie Carp (Katy Cavanagh), is Paula's daughter. When Paula finds out that Julie and Eileen live on the same street, she begins acting strangely and is hostile to Colin when she sees him. In April 2009, during Colin's seventieth birthday party in The Rovers, Eileen is horrified to learn that Colin is Julie's father after a drunken Paula reveals the truth, making Julie and Eileen half-sisters. Struggling with this bombshell, Eileen blames Paula for wrecking her parents' marriage as Eileen had blamed her mother but realises that Paula was a victim of abuse and makes amends with her a few days later. When Colin visits, trying to explain his actions, Eileen is disgusted. During the visit, Colin suffers a stroke, but Eileen refuses to take him to hospital. He is released from hospital and Jason and Julie convince Eileen to let him stay with her until they can find him somewhere to live but he dies of a heart attack.

In 2009, Eileen starts dating children's entertainer, Jesse Chadwick (John Thomson). He moves into Eileen's house, along with his parrot named John. In 2010, cracks begin appearing in the relationship after Eileen suspects that he is attracted to Julie and he takes his parents on holiday instead of her, following a bet that he wins. Eileen throws him out but he returns, attempting to reconcile with her but Eileen insists that he leave after she discovers that he made a pass at Julie.

In July 2010, builder Owen Armstrong (Ian Puleston-Davies) catches Eileen's eye and she is delighted when they date a few times and does some admin work at the builder's yard. However, Owen is more interested in Eileen's friend, Liz McDonald (Beverley Callard) and he starts dating her behind Eileen's back. Eileen is disgusted when she discovers that Owen and Liz are an item and plots revenge on Owen for the way he used her. In January 2011, Eileen discovers that her roof has been damaged after the tram crash and asks Owen to have a look. He tells her that the tiles are damaged and there is water damage in the interior walls, costing about £3,000 to fix. Eileen gets an insurance inspector to have a look but Jason thinks he is spying on his girlfriend, Rosie Webster (Helen Flanagan), and punches him so the inspector refuses to help Eileen; who steals a cheque for £10,000 that Carla Connor (Alison King) has left for Owen and cashes it. Owen finds out and offers to have a look at the house and tells Eileen that he knows she has taken his money and she will pay for it. Upset, she tells Julie what has happened and they devise a plan to break into the builder's yard to get documents that prove that Owen has been committing tax evasion for years. The sisters successfully blackmail Owen with this so he agrees to fix the roof. Several weeks later, Owen gets revenge for Eileen's blackmail by letting himself into her house and retrieving the paperwork Eileen stole after she tells Sunita Alahan about his dodgy business practices. He destroys the evidence and calls the police, reporting Eileen for the cheque she stole and she is arrested for fraud. Eileen admits her guilt and, as it is her first offence and she returned the money, she is released with a caution.

Eileen meets Paul Kershaw (Tony Hirst), a fireman, when her head is caught in the railings on her birthday on Underworld's roof. They start dating, but Marcus sees Paul with another woman in Freshco's, making Eileen angry so she visits Paul to demand answers and Paul's wife, Lesley (Judy Holt), answers the door. Eileen shouts at Lesley but she is confused. Paul comes to the door and tells Lesley to go inside, explaining to Eileen that Lesley has Alzheimer's disease, which explained why she didn't understand Eileen's question. Eileen and Paul stay friends and Paul helps Eileen when Eileen told Sunita that she would get somebody for the local school's safety day. Eileen invites Paul and Lesley to her house for Christmas dinner but they pull out after Lesley has a fall. Eileen goes on a speed dating night at Nick Tilsley's (Ben Price) Bistro and meets a man called Hank. They soon argue which ends up in Eileen pushing Hank into the fire alarm. Paul comes to the scene expecting a fire but Eileen asks him for a drink. One day, Paul asks Eileen if she would take care of Lesley while he is at work. Eileen does so, but she later regrets it when Lesley beats her up and physically throws her out of her own home. Jason takes Eileen to the café to calm down, but while she is at the café, Lesley dies after being electrocuted by the toaster. After Lesley's funeral, Paul and Eileen become a proper couple. Eileen becomes suspicious that Paul is having an affair with his colleague Toni, but he is actually planning a romantic proposal. Paul walks out and goes to The Rovers soon followed by Eileen who asks for forgiveness. Paul gets down on one knee and asks her to marry him.

As Paul, Jason and other men from Weatherfield take part in The Full Monty evening at the Bistro for charity, The Rovers is set on fire by Karl Munro, as part of an elaborate plan he has devised to win back ex-fiancée Stella. Norris Cole (Malcolm Hebden) alerts the Bistro, and Eileen is horrified when she witnesses Paul risk his life to save Stella Price (Michelle Collins) and Karl Munro (John Michie) from the burning building. Luckily, Paul manages to save himself, Stella and Karl from the flames, but Paul's friend Toni Griffiths (Tara Moran) perishes as the roof collapses on her. The next day, Paul grieves for Toni, and Eileen is petrified of Paul returning to work in case he dies like Toni did. After numerous arguments and several weeks off work, Paul finally returns to work at the fire station, worrying Eileen. Convinced Paul is not ready to return to work after Toni's death, Eileen visits Paul's boss and asks if he can have more time off. Unfortunately for Eileen, Paul walks in on her and his boss discussing this. The pair return home where they have an explosive argument and Paul decides to move in with Julie and her partner Brian Packham (Peter Gunn). This infuriates Eileen, leading to her rowing with Julie in the café. Eileen discovers the tickets for her and Paul's holiday to Egypt come through the door, and decides to take Julie on the holiday instead. She later regrets this when Julie says she wants to have an adventure with Eileen, whereas Eileen just wants to relax and forget all her troubles on the holiday. Paul reveals he is leaving the Street to work in North Yorkshire, upsetting Eileen. Her friend Deirdre Barlow (Anne Kirkbride) convinces her to go and find Paul and tell him not to leave her. She does so, and Paul and Eileen reunite as a couple, much to Deirdre and Julie's pleasure.

Eileen finds it difficult to get to sleep at night, worrying about Paul and whether he has died in a fire while at work. She decides to take some sleeping pills, but ends up falling asleep at work. When she wakes up, she is rude to Gary Windass (Mikey North) and is confronted by her colleagues, Steve and Lloyd Mullaney (Craig Charles). Eileen hears from her lodger Sean and son Jason that there has been a large house fire in Weatherfield and asks Paul whether he had been called to it when he returns. He tells Eileen he had been on a hoax call, but then reveals to Sean and Jason that he had been saving people from the house fire. The next day, a young boy named Paddy Kinsey (Sonny Cusworth), his mother Megan (Louise Atkins) and news reporter Will Reade (Dominic Doughty) arrive at Eileen and Paul's house and Eileen discovers that Paul was in fact at the house fire and not at a hoax call. Paddy, Megan and Will reveal how serious the fire was, which stuns Eileen, Jason and Sean. This infuriates Eileen, as Paul decided to lie to her instead of telling her the truth.

Eileen eventually comes to terms with Paul working at the fire station. Whilst playing darts at the Rovers with Jason and Steve, an oblivious Paul makes a racist comment just as Lloyd Mullaney (Craig Charles) and his daughter Jenna Kamara (Krissi Bohn) enter the pub, which angers them both as they are black. Paul is infuriated when Lloyd casts him a racist, and the pair nearly come to blows in The Rovers. Soon, the whole Street assume that Paul is racist, which makes Eileen feel ashamed. Paul will not apologise to Lloyd as he fears he will actually be considered a racist if he does. Eileen and Lloyd's partner Mandy Kamara (Pamela Nomvete) both agree that the pair should put it behind them, which it appears to be, before Jenna's girlfriend Sophie Webster (Brooke Vincent) calls Paul's work and reports him for racism. Paul's boss pays him a visit at Eileen's house, suspending him from work until further investigation. Paul sees red and punches Lloyd in the street, as many locals watch in horror. Before the pair descend into fighting, two policemen arrive and split them up. Paul is arrested and questioned, but the whole event leads to further strain on his and Eileen's relationship. Eileen later watches as Paul shouts at Sophie in the street, which leads to Eileen and Sophie's mother Sally Webster (Sally Dynevor) sharing a scrap in The Rovers. The feud puts pressure on Lloyd and Mandy's relationship too, which results in Mandy leaving Weatherfield. Paul invites Lloyd, Steve and Brian to a few drinks in town, but is furious when his mates from the fire station do not attend. He says it is because they think he is a racist, and he shouts at Lloyd when a group of men approach them. Later, as Lloyd is leaving the pub, the group of men attack him, pinning him up the wall and it transpires that they are a gang of racists. Paul arrives and saves Lloyd, which puts the arguing behind them. They arrive back in Weatherfield to reveal the good news to Eileen, but she is not impressed as Paul did not do anything about it sooner. They discuss how supportive she was when Lesley was alive, and how Paul would have left Eileen if Lesley did not have Alzheimer's disease. She then runs upstairs in anger. There is further upset for Eileen when Paul leaves Weatherfield for good.

Eileen is thrilled when her son Todd returns, although it becomes clear he has changed while he has been in London. She is forced to give him £500 so that he can pay back the people he has scammed money off. Eileen then learns that Todd cheated on his former boyfriend Jools Creme (Ben Allen) as he had an affair with a man named Alex. She is later shaken when Jason's estranged father Tony Stewart (Terence Maynard) returns to the street in 2014, and is not very pleased when Liz begins flirting with him. She is later unhappy when she discovers that Todd has had sex with Marcus Dent (Charlie Condou), who is in a serious relationship with Maria Connor (Samia Ghadie). She later begins a feud with Liz when she learns that she has entered a relationship with Tony and is later ashamed of Todd when his affair with Marcus is revealed. She has several arguments with Liz over Tony, and Liz later thinks that Eileen is jealous. As the feud progresses, Liz and Eileen eventually forgive one another. Eileen is later concerned when her friend Lloyd suffers a heart attack during Hayley Cropper's (Julie Hesmondhalgh) charity fun run.

After an argument with Todd, Eileen orders him to leave the family home, and while he is walking the streets in town, Todd is violently mugged and beaten up by a gang of thugs. He is rushed to hospital, and is told that he may have permanent scarring on his face. He blames Eileen and Jason for the attack, however keeps this to himself. In 2015, Eileen begins internet dating and meets a man named Adrian Mortimer (Mark Moraghan). She goes out with Adrian on numerous occasions, but Todd – attempting to exact revenge on his mother and brother for his attack – sets up a fake account on the same website and pretends to be a man named Jeff who lives in Dubai. Eileen soon decides that she prefers Jeff to Adrian, much to Todd's delight. Todd also makes Jason believe that his girlfriend Eva Price (Catherine Tyldesley) is having an affair with Tony, leading to Eva moving to New York to live with her mother as she believes Jason does not trust her. After Eileen reveals to Adrian that things are not working out, Todd arrives and reveals to a heartbroken Adrian that Eileen has met somebody else and reveals that he is Jeff. He also reveals that he broke Jason and Eva up, leading to Jason punching Todd in the face. Todd then leaves Weatherfield after the heated argument, and Eileen is distraught at how evil Todd has become. Eileen allows Michael Rodwell (Les Dennis) to move in with her after he discovers that his wife, Gail, lied to her about his son, Gavin (Mark Holgate), and discovering that Andy Carver (Oliver Farnworth) has been pretending to be his son. After a public argument with Gail, Michael gets drunk with Eileen, leading to them kissing. As they begin to have sex, Michael collapses and suffers a heart attack, leaving Eileen heavily humiliated. Michael admits the kiss with Gail out of guilt, but she storms over to the salon and starts throwing hair conditioner bottles at Eileen. The fight spills into the street, with Gail throwing her shoe at Eileen and Eileen pushing Gail to the ground.

In July 2015, Eileen is informed by Gail that her good friend Deirdre has died. She and Liz recollect their fond memories of Deirdre, before attending her funeral.

In June 2025, Eileen leaves Weatherfield for Thailand with Jason, after her relationship with George Shuttleworth (Tony Maudsley) ends and also in the aftermath of Julie's death.

== Reception ==
Eileen Grimshaw has been described as "a firm favourite with fans". Actress Sue Cleaver has commented on her character's popularity to the Belfast Telegraph in 2007: "Everyone seems to love Eileen. I've never had anybody come up and say they don't like her, so I suppose that's a good thing. She's an accessible character and I think everybody knows an Eileen. There's an Eileen in every street." Low Culture columnist Ruth Deller has included the character as one of the best soap creations during the 2000s. She stated, "Eileen arrived as the decade was just beginning and she's kept us entertained throughout. Sue Cleaver is great and so is the character. A classic soap matriarch she has the potential to be one of the most enduring and popular characters the Street has ever seen." In 2007, actress Sue Cleaver was recognised for her role as Eileen with a TV Now award for 'Favourite Female Soap Star'.

Sue Cleaver has revealed that she received letters of complaint from viewers when Eileen was shown to have a one-night stand with a boilerman: "I had so many letters of complaint about the one night stand she had with the boiler man. People said she wouldn't do that. She bloody well would! She's got two kids, she's been around the block a bit." In 2009, Digital Spy editor Kris Green praised Sue Cleaver's part in the Julie/ Paula/ Colin reveal when he stated; 'The outstanding performances from Katy Cavanagh (Julie) and Sharon Duce (Paula) mixed with Street legend Barbara Knox (Rita) and the still criminally underused Sue Cleaver (Eileen) make for compelling viewing' Sarah Ellis of Inside Soap opined that "poor" Eileen should join a convent because all of her romances end badly.
