= Robert Horwell =

British cinematographer and actor

Robert "Bob" Horwell is a British cinematographer and actor who was born in Scarborough, North Riding of Yorkshire. His father, whom he was named after, was a coal merchant and Audrey, his mother, was also a successful small businesswoman. His sisters Angela and Sue run a small designer clothing outlet in his hometown. He is best known as an actor for having played the role of Nick Neeson in the British soap opera Coronation Street. Horwell has also appeared on stage in many productions including War Horse, Henry V (Royal National Theatre), Cyrano de Bergerac (RSC and West End), Lysistrata (Sir Peter Hall Company Tour and West End), Edmond (Royal National Theatre, alongside Kenneth Branagh), Alice in Wonderland (Royal Shakespeare Company).

He has also appeared in shows such as The Bill, Holby City, Doctors, Heartbeat, A Touch of Frost.

Horwell also played Alex's Dad in the feature The Lost Choices, released by Metrodome Distribution in September 2015.

Horwell is also an accomplished and well respected cinematographer. He has shot many well known artists over the years, TV commercials and feature films including contributions to: The Lost Choices Hallows Eve Vishwaroopam II Capsule
