= All of Us (play) =

2022 play by Francesca Martinex

- Written by: Francesca Martinez
- Original language: English

Premiere
- Date premiered: 10 May 2022
- Place premiered: Royal National Theatre

All of Us is a 2022 debut play by Francesca Martinez.

== Plot ==
Jess, a therapist with cerebral palsy, is taking care of her vulnerable disabled clients due to the effects of austerity.

== Productions ==
All of Us had its opening night in the Dorfman Theatre at the National Theatre, London, on 4 August 2022, following previews from 27 July. It will play a limited run to 24 September.

== Cast and characters ==
Character	London (2022)
Rita/Dr Anderson/Angela	Lucy Briers
Jess	Francesca Martinez
Nadia/Marcella	Wanda Opalinska
Lottie	Crystal Condie
Yvonne/Anita	Goldy Notay
Aidan	Bryan Dick
Poppy	Francesca Mills
Dom/Bob	Oliver Alvin-Wilson
Henry	Kevin Hely
Hargreaves	Michael Gould
Raymond/Police Officer	Daniel Fearn
Ryan/Officer Chalfont	Chris Anderson
Kyle	Christopher John-Slater
Ensemble	Bonnie Baddoo; Mat Betteridge; Peter Eastland; Rebecca Todd

== See also ==
- Ableism
