= Wanda Opalinska =

English-Polish actress

- Born: England
- Education: University of Birmingham
- Occupations: Actress; Writer; Producer
- Years active: 2007–present
- Known for: Wiki Dankowska in Coronation Street
- Children: 1

Wanda Opalinska is an English-Polish actress, known for playing the part of Polish immigrant and Underworld factory worker Wiki Dankowska in the ITV soap opera Coronation Street.

== Early life ==
Opalinska went to drama school before studying English at the University of Birmingham from 1988 to 1991. She then qualified as an English teacher and taught in South London. She was a teacher of English and Drama at St Thomas More R.C. Secondary School, (Sloane Square, London), before leaving to further her teaching career at Whitgift School (South Croydon). There she was appointed first House Mistress (Ellis's) in the schools 400-year history. During her time at Whitgift her critique of George Orwell's Animal Farm was published by Longman as part of their acclaimed York Notes series.

== Career ==
Opalinska joined Coronation Street as a seamstress at the Underworld factory. Opalinska's first on-screen appearance as Wiki was on 26 February 2007. Wiki worked for Underworld manager Carla Connor (Alison King), and witnessed her friend Kasia Barowicz (Irena Rodic) die as she fell down the steps of the Underworld factory. She has appeared in ITV's The Sitcom Trials and the BBC's The Last Laugh. Opalinska then appeared in Waterloo Road in the episode first broadcast on BBC1 on 28 October 2010. (Series 6, Episode 10) Other television appearances include Doctors (BBC One) where she played Sue Pruce and Jackie Reynolds, Law and Order UK (ITV) where she played Marta, and Some Girls (BBC Three) where she played the part of Marie (Series One, Episode Three).

On 28 February 2013, Opalinska appeared in her first episode of the BBC soap opera EastEnders as Magda Bakowska, the carer for Patrick Trueman (Rudolph Walker). Opalinska made her final appearance as Magda on 4 March 2013. For theatre, Opalinska was recently in the Royal Court production of Truth and Reconciliation by Debbie Tucker Green.

In 2022 she played the roles of Nadia and Marcella in All of Us at the Royal National Theatre.

== Personal life ==
On 12 February 2009 Opalinska gave birth to a son, Rafal.

== Filmography ==
=== Films ===
Year	Title	Role
2016	A Monster Calls	Female Nurse
2018	Thin Air	Paula

=== Television ===
Year	Title	Role
2007–2009	Coronation Street	Wiki Dankowska
2010	Waterloo Road	Polish woman
2010	Doctors	Sue Pruce / Jackie Reynolds
2011	Law & Order: UK	Marta
2011	Emmerdale	Guest role
2012	Some Girls	Marie
2012	The Secrets	Stephanie
2014	Cardinal Burns	Ensemble actor
2014	The Mimic	Customer
2014	All at Sea	Madame Rose
2014	GameFace	Book group organiser
2015	Man Down	Magda
2015–2018	Parch	Oksana
2016	Raised by Wolves	Librarian
2016	Home Fires	Guest role
2016	Damilola, Our Loved Boy	Pathologist
2017	Carters Get Rich	Davina
2017–2018	Sick Note	Ward Nurse
2017	Peaky Blinders	Rosemary Johnson
2018	Ordeal by Innocence	Dr. Keagan
2018	Maigret	Jo Jo
2019	Giri/Haji	Ruth
2020	Casualty	Alison Butler
2020	Breeders	CPR Woman
2020–2022	Avenue 5	Bailey
2022	Killing Eve	Klaudia
2022	Hullraisers	Elaine
2025	Wild Cherry	Maria

=== Other ===
Year	Title	Role	Type
2014	The Vote	Actor	Television play/live broadcast
2015	An Inspector Calls	Charity Lady	Television film
2016	Damilola, Our Loved Boy	Pathologist	Television film
2017	Doctor Who: The Third Doctor Adventures	Dr. Lorna Holmes	Audio drama
2018	Ordeal by Innocence	Dr. Keagan	Television film
2019	The Paternoster Gang	Irinda	Audio drama/podcast series
2020	The Diary of River Song	Gudrun / Espen	Audio drama
2021	Survivors: New Dawn	Sal	Audio drama / podcast series
2022	All of Us	Nadia / Marcella	Theatre production; National Theatre
2022	National Theatre at Home: All of Us	Nadia/Marcella	Filmed theatre production
2025	Doctor Who: The Eighth Doctor – Time War	Mrs. Denison	Audio drama

=== Produced and written ===
Year	Project	Role	Type
2014	Cops and Monsters	Associate producer	Television/production
2024	The PA and the Manhattan Prince	Writer	Film/screenplay
