= Nikki Patel =

English actress

- Patel in 2007
- Born: 5 July 1990 (age 35); Bradford, West Yorkshire, England
- Occupations: Actress, writer
- Years active: 2002–present
- Known for: Role of Amber Kalirai in Coronation Street

Nikki Patel (born 5 July 1990) is an English actress and writer. She is known for playing Amber Kalirai in the ITV soap opera Coronation Street from 2005 to 2009, and from 2011 to 2012.

== Career ==
Patel joined the cast of Coronation Street in late 2005, playing Dev's teenage daughter Amber Kalirai. After four years, she left the show to pursue other acting roles and attend university. In 2011, she returned to Coronation Street and left the show again in March 2012. In 2006, Patel appeared in an episode of the BBC drama Waterloo Road. She played a character called Shazia Patel. One week after landing the role, she was nominated as Best Newcomer at the National Television Awards. In May 2022, she appeared in an episode of the BBC soap opera Doctors as Shelley Anwar. In 2026, Patel written a BBC pilot sitcom titled The Patels set in Bradford, about two, middle-aged British Gujarati women who despise each other. However both of their lives are thrown into chaos when they both receive an unexpected announcement from their sons respectively.

== Credits ==
Year	Title	Format	Role	Notes
2005–2009, 2011–2012	Coronation Street	Television	Amber Kalirai	Series regular
2006	Waterloo Road	Television	Shazia Patel	Episode #1.4
2015	Future Conditional	Stage	Alia	The Old Vic
2016	Holby City	Television	Madhu Saharan	Episode: "One Under"
2016	Branagh Theatre Live: Romeo and Juliet	Stage	Balthasar	Garrick Theatre
2016	The Island Nation	Stage	Nila	Arcola Theatre
2016	Alchemy	Stage	Unknown	Northwall Theatre
2016	The Five	Television	Mona	Episode #1.3
2017	Trojan Horse	Stage	Lindsay	The Lowry
2018	Sunshine On Leith	Stage	Eilidh Clarke	West Yorkshire Playhouse
2022	Call The Midwife	Television	Mrs. Singh	Episode #11.6
2022	Doctors	Television	Shelley Anwar	Episode: "Your Worst Nightmare"
2022	The Dark Pictures Anthology: The Devil in Me	Video game	Erin Keenan	Voice
2022	Little English	Film	Sweetie	
2026	The Patels	Television		Writer
