= Jonathan Dixon (actor) =

English thespian and producer

- Born: 10 August 1988 (age 37); Leeds, West Yorkshire, England
- Other name: Jonny Dixon (current professional name)
- Occupation: Actor • model
- Years active: 2002–present

Jonathan Dixon (born 10 August 1988), known professionally as Jonny Dixon, is a British television actor, best known for role as Darryl Morton in Coronation Street, Andy in Not Going Out and playground bully Matthew "Mooey" Humphries in long-running CBBC show Grange Hill.

He appeared in Manchester-based soap opera Coronation Street as Darryl Morton. He joined the soap in March 2007.

Dixon was born in Pudsey. He was a friend of Jack P. Shepherd who plays his on-screen friend David Platt before getting his role in Coronation Street. It was reported on 15 May 2009 that Dixon and co-star Wanda Opalinska would be written out of the soap and would be departing later in the year with it being said that this was due to "natural storyline progression." He last appeared in the episode broadcast on 16 October 2009.

In April 2011, Dixon filmed an episode of Doctors, to be broadcast on BBC1 in July 2011. He was a regular on Boy Meets Girl, playing the role of James on the first two series airing 2015–16.

For the last three years, he has taken part in 'Show in a Week' at South Craven School - a musical theatre production which is conceived, choreographed and rehearsed in just three days. In 2018, Dixon appeared in the Doctor Who episode "The Woman Who Fell to Earth" as Karl, a crane driver being hunted by an alien species. He reprised the role in "Eve of the Daleks", the 2022 New Year special.

Dixon runs his own independent film production company, Isaac Who, which is based in Leeds in the North of England. The company creates film, TV and video productions with specialism in actor showreels, corporate videos and live music video recordings. Dixon also produces and directors original films as part of Isaac Who. In 2019, he directed a series of short films in collaboration with Psychotastic Productions. These included; "Assisted" featuring his former Coronation Street co-stars Steven Arnold and Steve Huison, and "The Invisible Collection" starring Ian Gelder & Mark Wingett.
