= Emma Edmondson =

British television actress

Emma Edmonson (born 15 March 1984) is a British television actress, best known for playing Mel Morton in Coronation Street.

== Early life and education ==
Edmonson was born in Littleborough, Greater Manchester. She attended Wardle High School and earned a performing arts diploma at Shena Simon Sixth Form College.

== Career ==
Her first appearance on Coronation Street was in March 2007. She was cast in the role of 18-year-old Mel Morton. While in the role, she portrayed policewoman Morton in a scene where she and another character, Abi Sharpe, are brutally beaten by a girl gang. The Morton family were written out of the series after 18 months.

Edmonson also appeared in the music video for Deadmau5's 2008/2009 hit single "I Remember". She appears in a club with red makeup around her eyes.

In 2012, Edmonson appeared in two episodes of the British TV Television series Shameless as a Fast Food worker called Cheryl.

In 2014, Edmonson appeared in In the Flesh, a BBC television drama about zombies. She did the voiceover for The Co-operative Group Christmas television advertisement in 2016.
