= Steve November =

British television producer (born 1972)

- Born: Steven Frost; Nottinghamshire, England
- Education: Cambridge University
- Occupation: Television producer
- Years active: 1996–2018
- Television: Emmerdale; Coronation Street
- Spouse: Hayley November

Steve November (born Steven Frost) is a British television producer and executive. Originally known as Steve Frost during his early career, he became a writer for the Sky One drama Dream Team. He also took roles as an assistant director until he became a scriptwriter on the ITV soap opera Emmerdale. He progressed to become the series producer, a role he then took on at Coronation Street and The Royal. Within ITV he was promoted to Head of Continuing Drama, where he made decisions regarding ITV soap operas and weekly drama series. During this time he also served as the Executive producer of Emmerdale. In 2013, November took on the job of ITV's Director of Drama. In this role, November was responsible for commissioning numerous ITV dramas. In 2016, November left ITV after sixteen years. He then joined Lionsgate as their creative director in charge of UK television. He then created the production company Further South Productions.

== Career ==
November was born in Nottinghamshire, England. He graduated from Cambridge University. In his early career he was credited as Steve Frost. November's early roles included his work as a scriptwriter and storyline editor on Sky One drama Dream Team. It was while working on Dream Team that he met his future wife, Hayley November. He also became an assistant director on the Channel 4 soap opera's Brookside and Hollyoaks. One of his first ITV job roles was a story editor on the soap opera Emmerdale in 2000. November worked as a series producer for Emmerdale from April 2001 until December 2004. While working on Emmerdale, November was tasked with writing in the five winners of ITV's reality television series Soapstars. He extended their contracts but they were all written out of the series in 2002. On 16 December 2004, November announced his decision to leave Emmerdale and that he would be succeeded by Kathleen Beedles in January 2005.

In September 2005, it was announced that November would replace Tony Wood as the producer of Coronation Street. He was credited as producer from February 2006 and one of his first decisions was to write out four characters. While working on Coronation Street, November became the series producer of ITV's drama series The Royal. In November 2007, it was announced that November had decided to leave his role at Coronation Street. He remained with the show until 2008 until Kim Crowther took over his role. During his tenure he notably axed Bruce Jones' character, Les Battersby and oversaw the departure of long-standing character Vera Duckworth played by Liz Dawn.

In March 2008, it was announced that November had been appointed Head of Continuing Drama at ITV, replacing Corinne Hollingworth. In this role, November was tasked in controlling content and decisions over ITV's soap operas and its weekly dramas such as The Bill and Midsomer Murders. In January 2009, it was announced that November had replaced Keith Richardson as the executive producer of Emmerdale. After his tenure on Emmerdale had ended, he was credited with having transformed the "Yorkshire soap into a serious rival to EastEnders". Under his control the show won "Best Soap" at the 2011 Broadcast Awards and "Programme Of The Year" at the annual TV Times Awards. In 2009, he changed his surname from Frost to November to match his wife and children's surnames.

In April 2013, it was announced that November had replaced Laura Mackie as ITV's director of drama. While in the role, he aligned with STV to create the drama The Poison Tree. November also commissioned the series Beowulf: Return to the Shieldlands and served as its co-executive producer. He was also responsible for commissioning the shows Marcella, Prime Suspect 1973 and The Durrells. In April 2016, November left ITV after sixteen years. His departure was one of numerous departures that occurred after Kevin Lygo was appointed as ITV's director of television. Later in 2016, November joined Lionsgate where he assumed the role of creative director of UK television. November is also the managing director of the London and Brighton based production company, Further South Productions. In June 2018, November announced that he was working with screenwriter Alan Whiting to produce a new series titled Oil.
