= Samantha Seager =

British actress

- Born: Wigan, Lancashire, England
- Occupation: Actress
- Years active: 1995–present
- Known for: Me Too! Coronation Street; EastEnders

Samantha Seager is an English actress. She was born in Wigan, Greater Manchester, who played the role of Jodie Morton in the soap opera Coronation Street. Since leaving Coronation Street, Seager worked in television and theatre. She appeared in an episode of Little Britain, where she was one of Carol Beer's clients.

== Career ==
She played Cathy Rigby in one episode of The Bill (series 12, episode 149). She was in a one-off episode of the BBCs Waterloo Road in 2010, as Joely Vale. She has played the role of Bobby the Bus Cleaner on the programme on CBeebies, Me Too!. She played Dawn in Invincible by Torben Betts in 2014, at Richmond's Orange Tree Theatre, which then transferred to the St James Theatre, London. Seager has two children, Johnny and Willow. Her partner is a barrister.

In 2013, she played in the short film This is Vanity. In 2020 she narrated Eat Well For Less, a food show on BBC One.

In 2022, she appeared in an episode of the BBC daytime soap opera Doctors, in the role of Clare Howard. A year later, she appeared in the BBC soap opera EastEnders as Detective Sergeant Miles.
