= Michael Starke =

British actor (born 1957)

- Born: 13 November 1957 (age 68); Liverpool, Merseyside, England
- Occupation: Actor
- Years active: 1982–present
- Known for: Brookside; The Royal; Coronation Street
- Spouse: Lynn Francis
- Children: 2 daughters

Michael Starke (Michael Clarke) (born 13 November 1957) is a British actor and singer from Liverpool, England. He played Thomas 'Sinbad' Sweeney in Brookside, the Channel 4 soap opera, for sixteen years.

He then appeared in a Christmas 2000 episode of the BBC drama Casualty. In the episode, "A Turn of the Scrooge", broadcast on 16 December 2000, he played the part of Barry Dawson, a loner who is befriended by a widower neighbour (played by Kenneth Colley), following a rooftop accident with Christmas decorations.

Starke later appeared in the ITV drama The Royal as Kenneth Hopkirk, as policeman Arthur in the film The 51st State and as himself on Lily Savage's Blankety Blank. He is a patron of Zoe's Place Baby Hospice, a charity for sick babies and young children.

He appeared in the pantomime Cinderella in Southport over Christmas 2005 and in a pantomime of Aladdin during Christmas 2006 in York. He also appeared in the play No Holds Bard.

In March 2007, he joined the cast of Coronation Street as the patriarch of a new family, the Mortons, playing Jerry Morton, a single father who opens a kebab shop. He, along with the majority of the Morton family, left the show in September 2008.

His daughter, Hayley Hampson, appeared on the ITV show Grease Is the Word finishing in sixth place. His other daughter, Jamie, is an actress and appeared in an episode of The Royal.

In later years, he has starred in touring productions of musicals, including as Edna Turnblad in the first UK tour of Hairspray and originating the role of Monsignor Howard in the first UK tour of Sister Act the musical. He also made appearances in Anything Goes and Our Day Out.

Starke appeared in the 2014 Kenneth Branagh directed action thriller film "Jack Ryan: Shadow Recruit". Later he played a guest role in the soap opera Doctors.

In 2017 he appeared at the Liverpool Playhouse in the musical "The Star". The next year Starke appeared in Benidorm and in the TV drama "Virtues". He also appeared in the Christmas 2018 episode of Casualty in the guest role of Joe Blake. Between 2021 and 2023, he appeared as a taxi driver in the Channel 4 soap opera Hollyoaks.

In 2025 he reprised his Hollyoaks role in a special crossover episode with Brookside, where it turned out that this and his Brookside characters were actually the same person.
