= Joanne Jackson (Coronation Street) =

Fictional character from Coronation Street

- Coronation Street character
- Portrayed by: Zaraah Abrahams
- Duration: 2005–07
- First appearance: 28 February 2005
- Last appearance: 20 July 2007
- Introduced by: Tony Wood
In-universe information
- Occupation: Machinist
- First cousins: Jessie Jackson

Joanne Jackson is a fictional character from the British soap opera Coronation Street, played by Zaraah Abrahams. Abrahams was cast on the soap when she was still in school and she relocated from London to Manchester for the role. Joanne was introduced along with her "twin sister" Jessie (Nailah Cumberbatch) as new workers at the local lingerie factory, although it was later revealed that Jessie is actually Joanne's cousin. Joanne was characterised as being in Jessie's shadow, whilst Abrahams believed that Joanne was a nice and selfless person who wanted a simple life. Joanne's storylines have focussed on her failed attempts at romance with Nathan Harding (Ray Fearon) and Jamie Baldwin (Rupert Hill). Joanne later has relationships with Jamie's cousin Adam Barlow (Sam Robertson) and her boss Liam Connor (Robert James-Collier). A later storyline saw Joanne reveal that she is an illegal immigrant and her subsequent arrest by immigration officers. In April 2007, it was announced that Abrahams would be leaving the soap and she made her last appearance as Joanne on 20 July 2007. Abrahams enjoyed working on Coronation Street and believed that it was a great stepping stone for her career. Critics have noted that Abrahams is well-known for her role as Joanne, and they have referred to the character as brassy, scheming and a mainstay on the soap.

== Casting and characterisation ==
The character and casting was announced in February 2005, with it being reported that Joanne and Jessie (Nailah Cumberbatch) would be the first set of twins on the soap since the introduction of Steve (Simon Gregson) and Andy McDonald (Nicholas Cochrane) in 1989, and that Joanne and Jessie would "ruffle feathers" when they begin working at the factory. 17-year-old Zaraah Abrahams won the role of Joanne Jackson whilst she was still in school. After being cast, Abrahams moved from London, where she had grown up, to Manchester, where Coronation Street is filmed, and stayed there until her departure from the soap in 2007. Abrahams initially joined the soap on a short-term contract, but this was later extended. Abrahams appeared in over 200 episodes of Coronation Street as Joanne. Abrahams called Joanne a "really nice person", explaining that she "thought before she spoke, she was very selfless and just wanted a simple, happy life". In 2023, Abrahams called her time on the soap a "bit of a whirlwind", and added that she learnt a lot from the people on set and enjoyed being in Manchester. Abrahams also called her time on Coronation Street an "amazing stepping stone".

== Development ==
Joanne was introduced as the grand-niece of the friend of Mike Baldwin (Johnny Briggs), who gives Joanne and her "twin sister" Jessie (Nailah Cumberbatch) jobs at his lingerie factory. During the pair's first appearance, their new boss Danny Baldwin (Bradley Walsh) tries to make them feel welcome by playing a prank on the rest of the factory workers by pretending that it is impossible to tell Joanne and Jessie apart, despite them clearly being not identical. A writer from Inside Soap questioned whether the pair's co-workers would join in with the fun or if leave them out "in the cold" due to Danny's "special treatment". Cumberbatch departed Coronation Street as Jessie in 2006, after being one of the cast members axed by producer Tony Wood.

"The factory girl grew up in the shadow of her brasher twin sister Jessie. Since Jessie's departure she's found her own voice, although she still lets men push her around."

— An excerpt from Joanne's What's On TV character profile

Later in 2005, Mike's grandson, Jamie Baldwin (Rupert Hill), begins dating Joanne in order to prove to his former fiancé Leanne Battersby (Jane Danson) that he is over her. He is desperate to show that he is over Leanne and he recalls that on his birthday Joanne made it clear that she is "smitten" with him, so he begins flirting with her. Joanne is delighted when Jamie asks her out, but their date ends up being "disastrous". Hill revealed that being with Joanne is a complete "rebound" thing for Jamie, explaining that it's "a bit of a flat affair and Jamie's not really ready for it". Jamie then decides that he "quite likes" Joanne, though Hill did not think that the two characters would "run off down the aisle", as Hill believed that Jamie just wants to take his mind off Leanne and "the best way to do that is to see someone else". Joanne and Jamie end up enjoying each other's company and plan to see each other again, but they decide to not start something so soon after Jamie's breakup with Leanne and due to Jamie's problems with his alcoholic mother, Carol Baldwin (Lynne Pearson).

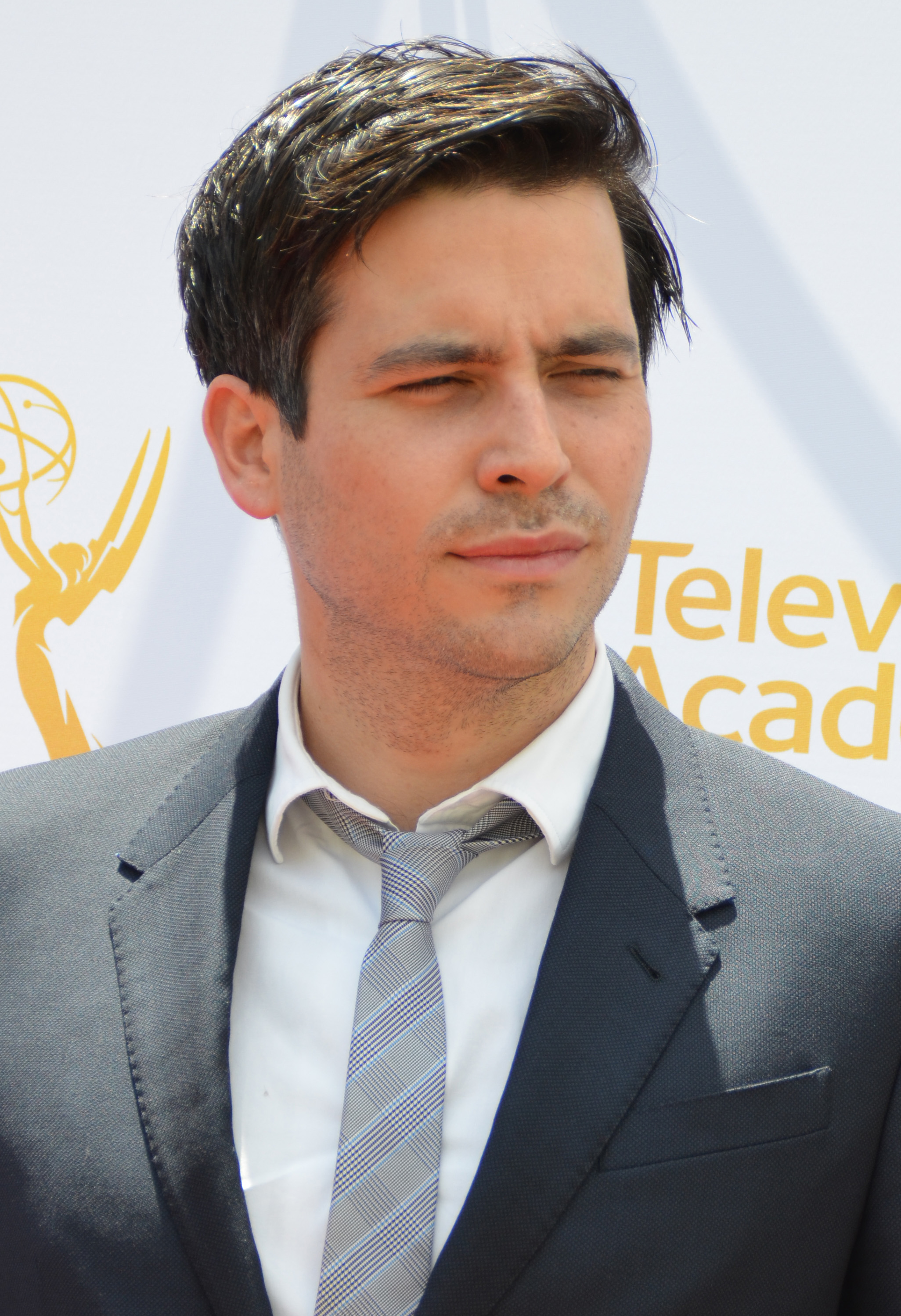
Robert James-Collier portrays Liam Connor, Joanne's boss and love interest.

In 2006, it was reported by a tabloid that Joanne would feature in a same-sex romance storyline which would see Joanne fall for another woman. However, Digital Spy rebutted the rumours, with a source confirming, "There are no current plans for Joanne to become entangled in a lesbian storyline." That same year, Joanne briefly has a romance with Jamie's cousin, Adam Barlow (Sam Robertson). She later breaks up with him via text message the following year when she begins an affair with her new boss, Liam Connor (Robert James-Collier). However, Joanne's "dreams" of a romance with Liam are "shattered" when he tells her that he only considers their time together to be "nothing more than a bit of fun" and writes off her hopes of a relationship, which leaves Joanne shocked. When Joanne's colleague Kelly Crabtree (Tupele Dorgu) announces her intention to ask out Liam, a "guilty" Joanne tells her what has been going on between them, which infuriates Kelly as Joanne knew that Kelly was after their boss. Liam later tells Joanne that she cannot rely on his support when a fight breaks out in Underworld. Months later, Joanne was featured in a storyline which saw her and her co-workers treat new Polish worker Wiki Dankowska (Wanda Opalinska) unfairly due to her immigration status. Coronation Street producers were confident that the storyline would not cause complaints due to the recent controversy that had occurred on Celebrity Big Brother. A source from the soap opera explained that the "scripts were done before the furore over Celebrity Big Brother and its bullying and racist content. There will be scenes where viewers think she is being picked on because of where she is from. We are mindful of people pointing the finger at how we portray her but the Street is never afraid to tackle sensitive issues".

In April 2007, it was announced that Abrahams would be departing Coronation Street as Joanne at the expiration of the actress' current contract. This was announced two weeks after Abrahams' co-star, Tina O'Brien, announced that she would also be leaving the soap as Sarah Platt. The soap's then-producer, Steve November, said of the departure, "Zaraah is a great actress but it is the nature of soap that characters come and go as in real communities. She has made a great contribution to the show but the way the storyline develops means that we have to say farewell to Joanne for the time being. We wish Zaraah well for the future". Abrahams revealed that she was looking forward to being able to play new roles after having portrayed Joanne for two years and previously a "long running character" on the TV series Girls in Love. Abrahams stated that she was "thrilled" to have been on the soap for "two fantastic years" as she had initially joined the soap on a short-term contract. She added, "I have had the most amazing time at 'Coronation Street' but am very excited about the future". Abrahams made her last appearance as Joanne that July. It was confirmed that the character would not be killed off and the door would remain open for Joanne to return.

Abrahams later admitted, "I was so young when I was in Coronation Street...at that age, you don't look beyond your next pair of Topshop shoes". Abrahams believed that she would go back to Coronation Street at some stage if she was asked, but explained that she treats jobs as "experiences" and doesn't try to look too far beyond each one. Abrahams later joined the cast of rival soap opera EastEnders, which she did not imagine that she would do when she left Coronation Street.

== Storylines ==
Joanne arrives to Weatherfield with her "twin sister" Jessie (Nailah Cumberbatch) to work at Underworld, the town's lingerie factory, after being promised jobs there by Mike Baldwin (Johnny Briggs), a friend of their grand-uncle. Joanne and Jessie cause amusement by pretending to be identical twins despite it being obvious that they are not. Joanne is more shy than Jessie and lacks confidence in regards to men. Joanne goes on a date with Nathan Harding (Ray Fearon), who she has a crush on, but this does not develop, and Joanne is left embarrassed that she had a makeover for Nathan as he is not really interested in her.

Jamie Baldwin (Rupert Hill), keen to show his former fiancé Leanne Battersby (Jane Danson) that he is over her, asks Joanne out, which delights Joanne as she fancies him. Despite having a disastrous date, but they realise that they enjoy each other's company and kiss. They promise to see each other again, but they decide to not start something so soon after Jamie's breakup with Leanne and due to Jamie's problems with his alcoholic mother, Carol Baldwin (Lynne Pearson). Joanne is saddened when Jessie is fired and leaves Weatherfield to become an air hostess. Kelly Crabtree (Tupele Dorgu) takes Joanne under her wing, which leads her to be threatened by Kelly's obsessed former friend, Becky Granger (Katherine Kelly). When Becky sets Kelly up for stealing at the factory, Joanne is the only person to believe Kelly's innocence and convinces their co-workers that it was Becky who is the thief. Joanne dates Jamie's cousin, Adam Barlow (Sam Robertson). However she later begins dating her new boss, Liam Connor (Robert James-Collier), and breaks up with Adam via text message.

When new Polish workers begin working at Underworld, Joanne talks badly about them. She then confides to Hayley Cropper (Julie Hesmondhalgh) that she is an illegal immigrant that came from Liberia at the age of eight, and that Jessie is in fact her cousin, not her twin sister. Janice Battersby (Vicky Entwistle) believes that the Polish workers are the illegal immigrants and tries to get them fired, which leads to Joanne being arrested by immigration officers when they raid the factory. When Joanne is released from Immigration Detention, she resumed her job at Underworld for two weeks. However, Carla Connor (Alison King) fires her, claiming that the factory is overstaffed and that Joanne is the newest employee despite having worked there for two years previously before her arrest. Joanne threatens to take Carla and Liam to tribunal for unfair dismissal and cites her fling with Liam as sexual harassment. Carla offers Joanne £5000 for her silence, which she accepts before leaving Weatherfield.

== Reception ==
A writer from Inside Soap called Joanne and Jessie "brassy" and teased that there would be "double trouble" at the factory when they arrive. A writer from the same magazine called Joanne a "smitten seamstress" in regards to Joanne's feelings towards Liam. Johnathon Hughes from Digital Spy called Joanne one of Adam's "forgettable factory girls" romances. A writer from The Sunday People called Joanne a "mouthy factory girl" and believed that Abrahams "shot to fame" playing her. Similarly, Patrick McLennan from Radio Times wrote that Abrahams "first made a name for herself" when she played Joanne on the soap. McLennan's colleague, Ayaan Ali, wrote that Abrahams was probably "best-known" for having played Joanne, an opinion which was shared by Kelby McNally from OK! and Daniel Kilkelly from Digital Spy. Tom Haynes from MyLondon believed that Abrahams was a "mainstay" on the soap as Joanne, but also called the character Abrahams' "forgotten role". Halina Watts from the Daily Mirror called Joanne "scheming".
