= Carol Baldwin (Coronation Street) =

Fictional character from Coronation Street

- Coronation Street character
- Portrayed by: Lynne Pearson
- Duration: 2005–06
- First appearance: 15 May 2005
- Last appearance: 15 January 2006
- Introduced by: Tony Wood
In-universe information
- Occupation: Bookmaker
- Husband: Danny Baldwin (1979–1985)
- Sons: Jamie Baldwin
- Grandsons: Dylan Wilson (adoptive)

Carol Baldwin (also Saunders) is a fictional character from the British ITV soap opera Coronation Street, played by Lynne Pearson. She made her first appearance on 15 May 2005 and departed in January 2006. She is introduced as the estranged mother of Jamie Baldwin (Rupert Hill) and the ex-wife of Danny Baldwin (Bradley Walsh). Her storylines include her alcoholism causing problems for her family, exposing the affair between her Danny and their son's girlfriend Leanne Battersby (Jane Danson) and dating local bookmaker Eric Talford (Tony Slattery). She later clashes with her son Jamie when he begins a controversial relationship with his stepmother Frankie Baldwin (Debra Stephenson) and is thrown out of the house. The character was received negatively by critics, who did not like her negative attributes and general miserable demeanour.

== Creation and development ==
In 2004, the Baldwin family was expanded to include a new extended family for the long-serving Mike Baldwin. Actress Lynne Pearson originally auditioned for the role of Frankie Baldwin but was later offered the role of Carol. Pearson previously appeared in the soap as Detective Constable Lynn White in March 1979. The London-born actress said that filming in Manchester used the isolation to positive effect for the character of Carol. In order to prepare for the role Pearson visited Alcohol Concern in Manchester to research the storyline and met reformed alcoholics who offered her advice on playing the character. She appeared in 50 episodes. Carol departed in January 2006 after she was thrown out by Jamie and Frankie after she accused them of having sex; by the end of that year, the entire Baldwin family had been written out.

=== Characterisation ===
"What has happened to her is unimaginable. If my husband had taken my son away when he was four it could have turned me to drink too... But she's great fun, she has a business head, she loves very hard, but she can't leave the past behind. She did nothing to deserve the cards she was dealt in life and I feel a real sympathy for her."

— Pearson on Carol's characterisation

Carol was characterised as "Jamie Baldwin's miserable mum". In her time she struggled to hold down jobs and relationships. Throughout she had moments of sobriety but continued to fall off the wagon causing trouble for her family. Coronation Street had previously included an alcoholism storyline. Soon after her introduction she conflicts with her ex-husband Danny. When she discovers that Danny and Leanne are having an affair she drunkenly exposes the truth to Jamie. Carol's jealousy towards Frankie causes her to ask Jamie to move back with her in Birmingham but decides to stay. Her co-dependency with Jamie causes him to break up with his new girlfriend Joanne Jackson (Zaraah Abrahams). She was described as an alcoholic vamp in the media. Her drink problem is evident when she makes a drunken pass at young mechanic Nathan Harding (Ray Fearon). Her character, from Southern England, contrasted with the other characters in the northern-based soap.

== Storylines ==
The backstory is that her husband Danny had a secret affair with their son's babysitter Frankie (Debra Stephenson). Carol was oblivious to this and only finds out when Danny leaves her to marry Frankie, taking Jamie with him. Carol is abandoned and doesn't see her son for many years as Danny and Frankie raise Jamie without her and have a son of their own Warren (Danny Young).

In 2005, Jamie tracks down Carol to Birmingham and decides to pay her a visit. It soon becomes clear that past events have affected Carol's life very badly; she has never remarried, is living in a run down flat, and is an alcoholic with no job or money. Jamie becomes very concerned for his mother and secretly visits her many times in Birmingham. On one occasion he brings his girlfriend Leanne Battersby (Jane Danson). Danny visits her himself; and warns his son to cut all contact with Carol.

Carol appears in Weatherfield for the first time for Jamie's 25th birthday party, much to the horror of her ex-husband, Danny, his wife, Frankie and their son Warren. Her arrival brings tension to the household and her alcoholism becomes an issue for the family. Frankie insists that Danny let her stay for a while but eventually her behaviour leads to Danny throwing her out. In September 2005, she returns to Weatherfield and immediately asks Leanne awkward questions about the postponed wedding. Her alcohol withdrawal symptoms causes conflict between the family members. She eventually admits the seriousness of her problems to her son Jamie. Jamie tries to help his mother with her condition and even arranges for her to attend an alcohol support group. After going sober Carol and Jamie start to finally bond after years of estrangement.

After moving to Weatherfield, she begins working for Eric Talford (Tony Slattery) at his bookies and later goes on a date with him. During the date, he was interrupted by his wife, who was sitting at another table. She walked over to Carol and Eric and tells her that he always books a table there when she has one booked, usually with a different woman each time, causing Carol to throw the contents of the table on the floor. Despite the negative first experience, Carol agreed to go on a second date with Eric, this time on Christmas Day. However during the meal, Carol became rowdy after a bottle of wine and argued with her ex-husband, Danny Baldwin (Bradley Walsh), who was sat at a different table.

When her ex-husband Danny begins an affair with her sons girlfriend, Leanne, Carol is suspicious and eventually finds out the truth from Frankie. She eventually becomes the person that exposes the affair by telling Jamie the truth. When Frankie and Danny split up, Carol moves in with them to be closer to Jamie and he makes her promise to give up alcohol. However, in January 2006, Jamie and Frankie throw Carol out when she accuses them of sleeping together and her drinking continues. After her last appearance Jamie and Frankie pursue an affair later in 2006. In 2007, it becomes apparent that Carol has ditched the drink and is now engaged. On 25 September 2007, Jamie and Violet Wilson (Jenny Platt) attend Carol's wedding.

== Reception ==
The character was received negatively by critics, with one describing her as Weatherfield's answer to Charles Kennedy. The alcoholism storyline was also received negatively and was described as turning the soap into EastEnders. The Daily Mirror described Carol as a horrible and miserable character comparing her to a younger version of Catherine Tate's Nan. It was alleged that her drunkenness had interrupted what could have been a "sensational Christmas incest storyline" between her son Jamie and his stepmother Frankie.

== See also ==
- List of former Coronation Street characters
