= Adam Barlow =

Fictional character from Coronation Street

- Coronation Street character
- Sam Robertson as Adam Barlow (2018)
- Portrayed by: Iain De Caestecker (2001–2003); Sam Robertson (2004–present)
- Duration: 2001–2007, 2016–present
- First appearance: 14 January 2001
- Introduced by: Jane MacNaught (2001); Kieran Roberts (2003); Tony Wood (2004); Kate Oates (2016)
In-universe information
- Occupation: Solicitor
- Father: Mike Baldwin
- Mother: Susan Barlow
- Half-brothers: Danny Baldwin; Mark Redman
- Wife: Sarah Platt (2020–2024)
- Stepsons: Harry Platt
- Stepdaughters: Bethany Platt
- Grandfathers: Ken Barlow; Frank Baldwin
- Grandmothers: Valerie Barlow; Mary Baldwin
- Uncles: Lawrence Cunningham; Peter Barlow; Daniel Osbourne
- Aunts: Tracy Barlow (adoptive)
- Nephews: Jamie Baldwin; Warren Baldwin
- First cousins: James Cunningham; Simon Barlow; Bertie Osbourne; Amy Barlow (adoptive)

Adam Barlow is a fictional character from the British ITV soap opera Coronation Street, played by Sam Robertson. He made his first appearance on-screen on 14 January 2001. Adam was played by Iain De Caestecker from the character's first appearance in 2001 until 21 July 2003 with Robertson taking over the role from 31 December 2004 until 20 April 2007. Robertson reprised the role in 2016 and made his return on screen on 16 November 2016. Adam is the son of Mike Baldwin (Johnny Briggs) and Susan Barlow (Joanna Foster), and the grandson of Ken Barlow (William Roache).

== Creation ==
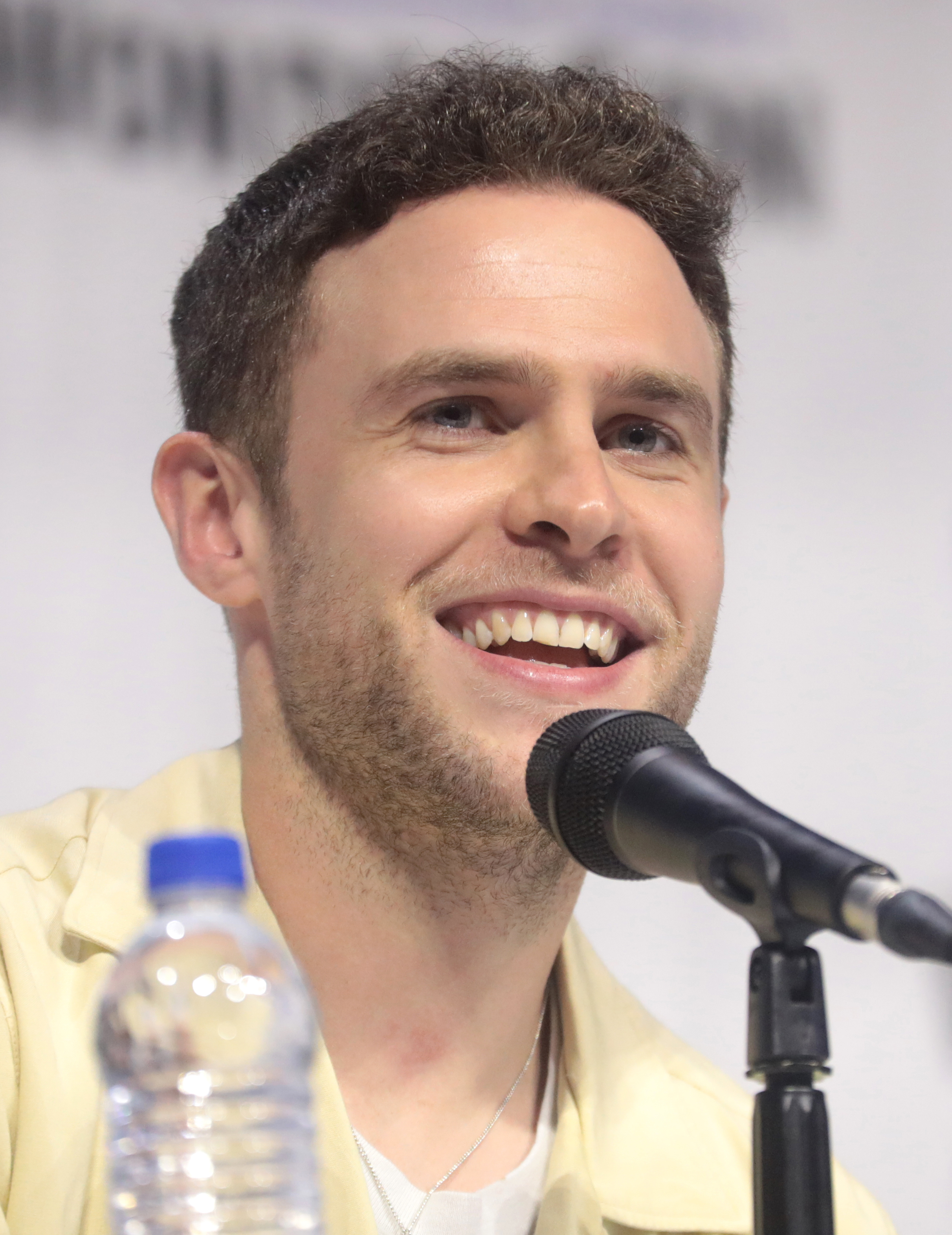
Iain De Caestecker (pictured) was introduced as Adam as part of a custody battle storyline, in 2001.

Adam was introduced in January 2001, played by Iain De Caestecker, as part of a storyline which involved a custody battle between long-time rivals Ken Barlow (William Roache) and Mike, the character of Adam departed at the conclusion of the storyline, however De Caestecker reprised the role for two separate stints in 2002 and 2003. On 13 December 2004, it was reported by Digital Spy that the role of Adam had been recast with Sam Robertson taking over the role from 31 December 2004.

== Development ==
In July 2016, it was announced that Coronation Street would be extending the Barlow family by reintroducing Adam along with Peter Barlow (Chris Gascoyne) and Daniel Osbourne (Rob Mallard). It was announced that Chris Gascoyne had reprised his role as Peter and Rob Mallard had taken over the role as Daniel, followed by Robertson reprising his role as Adam. Addressing the plans, producer Kate Oates told Digital Spy: "One of the things I am most excited about and something I consider a real privilege is that I am lucky enough to work on the longest-running soap. One of the longest-running families on that soap is the Barlows and why would you not want to strengthen that family? I love the idea of Ken as the head of the family which has Tracy, Simon and Amy. I am excited to bring Peter back to the show. I am delighted to meet Daniel Osbourne, who is Ken's child with Denise and I am excited to bring back Adam, who is Mike Baldwin's son and Ken's grandson. I think that strong family dynasty - the first family on the soap, as it were - here, big, strong and sending ripples through the street, is really exciting and I am really looking forward to seeing that."

Of his return, Robertson said, "I'm delighted to be back. Coronation Street was my first job as an actor and is a special place for me. As a young actor it was a little overwhelming, so I'm looking forward to coming back and stamping my mark on the character - I feel there's unfinished business with Adam." In an interview with the Radio Times, asked if Adam would become a womaniser like his father Mike Baldwin (Johnny Briggs), Robertson replied: "Oh yes, it's in my contract! Absolutely Adam's a womaniser and at the minute he doesn't seem to have much regard for the women he's with. He doesn't seem to have much heart, but maybe this is leading to him getting his fingers burnt."

In 2017, a "whodunnit" storyline involving the character of Ken Barlow began; the storyline saw an unknown person push Ken down the stairs in the Barlow household, with Adam being named as one of the suspects alongside Daniel, Peter, Tracy, Amy, Pat Phelan and Sinead Tinker. ITV released a poll to the Coronation Street website so that fans could share their thoughts as to who pushed Ken. Fans and viewers used the poll, with the majority's thoughts of the attacker being Adam. Robertson later admitted that he thought Adam pushed Ken. The attacker was later revealed to be Daniel.

== Storylines ==
=== 2001–2007 ===
Adam first appears aged 12 when he is visiting his uncle Peter Barlow (Chris Gascoyne), grandfather Ken Barlow (William Roache) and Ken's partner Deirdre Rachid (Anne Kirkbride), with his mother, Susan Barlow (Joanna Foster). It is revealed that Ken's arch-enemy and Susan's former husband, Mike Baldwin (Johnny Briggs), is Adam's father. Adam is injured in a car crash that kills Susan. Following a custody battle between Ken and Mike, Adam goes to live with Mike but then leaves for boarding school in Scotland. He returns after doing his Highers exams.

Adam purchases a car from an auction, but in an embarrassing turn of events, after filling his car up with petrol on a day out with his girlfriend Candice Stowe (Nikki Sanderson), his car ignites by the roadside. The cause of the fire is a mystery until a WPC informs him that his car functions on diesel, not petrol. He works at his father's factory, Underworld, and irritates his older half-brother, Danny Baldwin (Bradley Walsh), by being the apple of his father's eye. He is dumped by ambitious Candice via letter, has a short fling with Kelly Crabtree (Tupele Dorgu), and has a crush on Sarah Platt (Tina O'Brien) when he first returns to Weatherfield. Adam begins dating shy factory worker Joanne Jackson (Zaraah Abrahams) after they flirt at his birthday party.

Adam is devastated when Mike dies of a heart attack. Adam is determined to bring Danny down after he steals his inheritance, unaware that Mike's will is invalid because a more recent will left everything to him. Only Danny and Leanne Battersby (Jane Danson) are aware that it existed, and Danny is determined to ensure that Adam does not get his inheritance. However, following her split from Danny, Leanne gives a copy of the new will to Adam, meaning he could claim his inheritance and press criminal charges against Danny. After Danny is questioned by the police, he offers Adam a 40% share of the factory and, acting on Ken's advice, Adam accepts. In September 2006, Adam sells his 40% to Liam Connor (Rob James-Collier). Liam's older brother, Paul (Sean Gallagher), purchases the remaining 60% in January 2007. Joanne later dumps Adam by text message, after not seeing him for months. Adam leaves Weatherfield in April and moves to Portsmouth with his uncle, Peter, where they open a betting shop together.

=== 2016–present ===
In November 2016, on his return to Weatherfield, Adam is caught in Underworld by current owner, Johnny Connor (Richard Hawley) and his son, Aidan Connor (Shayne Ward). He, Peter and his aunt, Tracy Barlow (Kate Ford), visit Ken in hospital following a stroke. They meet Ken's son, Daniel Osbourne (Rob Mallard). Adam joins his family for a meal and defends Tracy against her ex-husband, Robert Preston (Tristan Gemmill). Adam gets revenge on Robert by calling environmental health. Daniel is suspected of stealing Adam's car when Tracy and Adam visit his flat and find student debts and become suspicious when his mother, Denise Osbourne (Denise Black) is nowhere to be found. Adam later has sex with Maria Connor (Samia Longchambon), causing a fight between him and Aidan in The Rovers. Adam continues his feud with Aidan while forming a friendly rivalry with Daniel and Todd Grimshaw (Bruno Langley).

In February 2017, Adam has sex with Rosie Webster (Helen Flanagan) and they begin a relationship. Adam finds out that Rosie and her sister, Sophie Webster (Brooke Vincent), buried cocaine in Brian Packham's (Peter Gunn) allotment. When Ken is pushed down the stairs by an unknown assailant, Adam becomes prime suspect as he and Ken had argued about Ken's will. Adam uses the drugs to blackmail Rosie into giving him a false alibi but is arrested when Rosie's alibi is proved false. As there is insufficient evidence to charge Adam, he is released. Adam becomes suspicious of Daniel but Tracy believes Adam is responsible and tries to set him up but he finds out and reveals that he is suspicious of Tracy. Tracy's daughter, Amy Barlow (Elle Mulvaney), believes Adam is responsible and calls the police with evidence to prove this. Adam is released again but turns his attentions to Daniel and his girlfriend, Sinead Tinker (Katie McGlynn). When Tracy and Amy disappear, Adam uses this to his advantage and frames her. Tracy confesses, trying to protect Amy as she believes that Amy could be responsible. Adam suspects Daniel after Tracy is cleared and kidnaps him, taking him to an isolated area, intending to make him confess but he fails and Daniel escapes. Adam is arrested again and charged with Ken's attack. Daniel is revealed as Ken's real attacker; he had hit him over the head with a poetry book, making him fall down the stairs.

Adam later discovers that Aidan is having an affair with Maria when he sees them kissing. Adam takes a photo of them and uses it to blackmail Aidan. He plans to expose the affair to Aidan's fiancée, Eva Price (Catherine Tyldesley), but Eva reveals that she is aware of his affair with Maria and begs Adam to stop blackmailing Aidan, before revealing that she has faked her pregnancy so that Aidan will not go to Maria. Adam agrees, but Eva reveals that she is out for revenge and needs Adam's help. Adam agrees and they plan revenge. However, as Eva is about to marry Aidan, she changes her mind at the last minute about the plan to clear the factory and the bank accounts, unaware that Adam has proceeded with the plan. When the Connors discover Eva's deceit, they report her to the police. Eva angrily vows to Adam that she intends to drag him to prison with her.

In February 2020, Adam marries Sarah Platt (Tina O'Brien).

== Reception ==
In August 2017, Robertson was longlisted for Sexiest Male at the Inside Soap Awards. He made the viewer-voted shortlist, but lost out to Davood Ghadami, who portrays Kush Kazemi in EastEnders.
