= Kelly Crabtree =

Fictional character from Coronation Street

- Coronation Street character
- Portrayed by: Tupele Dorgu
- Duration: 2004–2010
- First appearance: Episode 5839; 6 September 2004
- Last appearance: Episode 7298; 19 March 2010
- Introduced by: Tony Wood
In-universe information
- Mother: Zandra Matthews
- Adoptive father: Brian Crabtree
- Adoptive mother: Debra Crabtree
- Half-sisters: Leah Matthews

Kelly Crabtree is a fictional character from the British ITV soap opera Coronation Street. Portrayed by Tupele Dorgu, the character first appeared on-screen during the episode airing on 6 September 2004. On 6 November 2009, it was announced that Dorgu had decided not to renew her contract which meant that her character would depart the show in March 2010. She made her last appearance on 19 March 2010.

== Casting ==
Kelly has been described as a feisty girl, who has a mouthy and outspoken nature, also she is from a mixed race background. The official Coronation Street website describes the character as "brash and bolshy, Kelly is the sort of girl who goes for what she wants and rarely thinks of the consequences of her actions". Dorgu has also described Kelly as "sexy and uses her sexuality to get what she wants. She doesn't take any prisoners and is incredibly selfish. She looks a bit like a dolly bird, but she is not to be underestimated." Natalie Gumede, who would later play Kirsty Soames, had originally auditioned for the part of Kelly, but lost out to Dorgu.

== Development ==
Kelly first appeared in September 2004. She had been working in the background of the Underworld clothing factory for some time. On the day that the rest of the workers take any notice of her, she is leaving to get married and move away.

She quits her job and Sean Tully (Antony Cotton) takes over. However, her fiancé has cheated on her and she decides to leave him. After begging for her job back at the factory, Danny Baldwin (Bradley Walsh) keeps both her and Sean. She begins a short-lived flirtation with her boss who gives her the nickname of "Legs", although it never quite develops into an affair. Always one for a challenge, Kelly tries to seduce gay best friend Sean Tully but fails.

It was announced on 26 December 2007 that the character was to receive a big storyline during 2008, featuring a wager between the new father and son bookies on the street. Also lined up for the character in 2008 were parties selling underwear, which Kelly would model herself. It is also noted that Kelly's residence has never been seen or mentioned despite being on the soap for six years.

== Storylines ==
In 2004, Karen McDonald (Suranne Jones), heads to work and is waiting outside the factory and starts talking to Kelly Crabtree, a machinist at Underworld who is leaving as she is getting married. Karen tells Kelly that she will buy her a drink at lunchtime in the Rovers. Kelly comments about there being a clique and Karen says that Underworld is too small for that. Karen leaves her husband Steve McDonald (Simon Gregson) and lets Sonia Marshall (Tina Gambe), Janice Battersby (Vicky Entwistle), Kelly and Hayley Cropper (Julie Hesmondhalgh) have a look through her stuff and pick what they want. Kelly is back after not getting married. Her husband-to-be slept with her chief bridesmaid after catching her with a cocktail waiter. Kelly asks Danny Baldwin (Bradley Walsh) for her job back but is told she has been replaced by Sean Tully (Antony Cotton). Danny winds Kelly and Sean up about who can have the job then tells them that they can both work at Underworld.

In 2005, Kelly starts seeing Lloyd Mullaney (Craig Charles) but after she finds out he is cheating on her, she puts laxatives in his drink. Lloyd is rushed to hospital but recovers. Kelly later admits that she put the laxatives in his drink and they break up. Later, Lloyd wants to reconcile but she isn't prepared to forgive his cheating. In December 2005, Kelly wins £2,500 on a scratch card. However, she is mugged the day after she wins it but the police return some of what was stolen. In a moving scene with Lloyd in his taxi following the attack, she asks whether it was her skin colour that made her a target. The following year, Kelly's old friend Becky Granger (Katherine Kelly) appears on the scene. Much to Kelly's annoyance, Becky starts becoming obsessive with Kelly. She gets a job at Underworld and starts hanging around with her mates. She later buys Kelly a watch for her birthday, but because of Becky's criminal past, Kelly is suspicious that the watch is stolen. Becky later shows Kelly the receipt, and Kelly feels bad for not having trusted her friend. It is later revealed that Becky has spent too much on the watch and is unable to pay her rent. She is kicked out of her flat by her landlord, and, feeling guilty, Kelly offers to let her stay with her and Lloyd for a few days. A few days turn into a few weeks, and Kelly, who has become annoyed with Becky for coming between her and Lloyd, tells her that it is time for her to move out. Becky appears to "take it on the chin", but later swears to get revenge on Kelly.

Becky starts flirting with Lloyd and plants a kiss on him, which he rejects, ordering her to leave. She also steals some of her workmates' jewellery and money and plants them in Kelly's locker. Kelly is arrested for theft and is sacked from Underworld. Kelly's criminal past is revealed to her workmates, who disown her as a friend. Becky disappears and Kelly is left to face the consequences of a crime she didn't commit. Lloyd advises Kelly to plead guilty to the thefts and receive a lesser charge. Eventually, her friends come to believe her. She is given a suspended sentence and given back her job at Underworld. Her relationship with Lloyd, however, takes a turn for the worse, as she thinks it was wrong for him to have suggested to her to plead guilty. She decides that she needed some time apart from Lloyd. During a drunken night out, Kelly ends up drowning her sorrows with Steve McDonald (Simon Gregson). One thing leads to another, and they have a one-night stand. The next morning, they agree it was a "one off" and to keep it quiet. However, Steve needs to prove he was with Kelly to get an alibi for a hit-and-run case, which he is a suspect in; this leads to everyone finding out. Even though they were on a break, Lloyd can't believe that Kelly had slept with Steve and calls off the relationship permanently.

Kelly later gets another job working for Carla Connor (Alison King). She falls for Liam Connor (Rob James-Collier), Carla's brother-in-law, and is outraged when she discovers that he is seeing her best mate, Joanne Jackson (Zaraah Abrahams). As revenge, she gets Joanne sacked, but is shocked to discover that arch enemy Becky is Joanne's replacement.

In early 2008, Kelly, desperate to earn some extra cash, begins stealing leftover material from the knicker bins at the factory. She then proceeds to sell her own products on the side. Fellow factory worker Wiki Dankowska (Wanda Opalinska) soon discovers what Kelly is up to and urges her to come clean. It all comes out when barmaid Lauren Wilson (Lucy Evans) gets a drink spilt down her top in the Rovers. As she takes her top off Liam notices that she is wearing one of Underworld's reject bras. Both Carla and Liam pretend to put the blame onto Wiki and sack her. After that Kelly comes clean and is nearly sacked but Wiki intervenes and gets her rehired (to make up for her wrongful accusation) and is placed on a lower wage with a six-month probation period.

In October 2008, she begins dating bookmaker Dan Mason (Matthew Crompton) following his split from Leanne Battersby (Jane Danson). However, Dan soon tires of Kelly asking him to lend her money and dumps her just as they are due to go on holiday, leaving the Street without her.

In March 2009, Kelly's bitterness towards Becky resurfaces when they get into a blazing row in The Rovers Return. Ignoring Becky's excuses that she is under pressure to serve her, due to a large group of music fans wanting food, Kelly goes behind the bar and starts helping herself. Becky is furious and throws her out of the pub just as landlady Liz McDonald (Beverley Callard) arrives back from lunch. Liz, to Becky's outrage, apologises to Kelly and offers her free drinks.

In early 2010, Kelly has a lot of friction with boss Carla regarding time off, being angry that Sally Webster (Sally Dynevor) has got a lot of time off. On discovering that Sally has breast cancer, Kelly shows little sympathy towards her, calling her colleagues hypocrites for suddenly liking someone they hated, over an illness, causing further rivalry. Kelly's hatred of Carla boils over in March 2010, when she complains about her being lazy at work and labels her a "slapper" much to Kelly's indignation. Nick Tilsley (Ben Price), wanting to buy into the factory, spots an opportunity to use Kelly in his quest to attain shares. After sleeping with her, he persuades her to help him get access to the factory's accounts behind Carla's back. She complies with his request.

Nick successfully buys into Underworld but Carla guesses correctly that Kelly has supplied him with information. Both Nick and Carla sack her. After an angry confrontation with Nick outside the factory for betraying her, Kelly then insults the factory girls in the Rovers about their dead-end working class lives as machinists. She announces that she is leaving Weatherfield before having an emotional goodbye with close friend Janice Battersby (Vicky Entwistle) who understands her anguish. She walks away, shouting, "I'm Kelly Crabtree with the legs!" before disappearing.

== Reception ==
In 2024, Emily Stedman from Digital Spy wrote that "Coronation Street fans will remember Dorgu's character Kelly stirring up trouble in Weatherfield during her six-year stint", noting how Kelly "famously" had a rivalry with Becky and an on-off relationship with Lloyd.
