= Sean Tully =

Fictional character from Coronation Street

- Coronation Street character
- Portrayed by: Antony Cotton
- Duration: 2003–present
- First appearance: 13 July 2003
- Introduced by: Jane Macnaught (2003); Kieran Roberts (2004)
- Crossover appearances: East Street (2010)
In-universe information
- Occupation: Machinist; Barman; Receptionist; Make-up salesperson
- Father: Paul Jones
- Mother: Maureen Tully
- Stepfather: Brian Tully
- Half-sisters: Angela Tully
- Sons: Dylan Wilson

Sean Tully is a fictional character from the British ITV soap opera Coronation Street, played by Antony Cotton. He made his first appearance during the episode broadcast on 13 July 2003. Following that appearance, the character returned full-time on 12 April 2004.

== Development ==
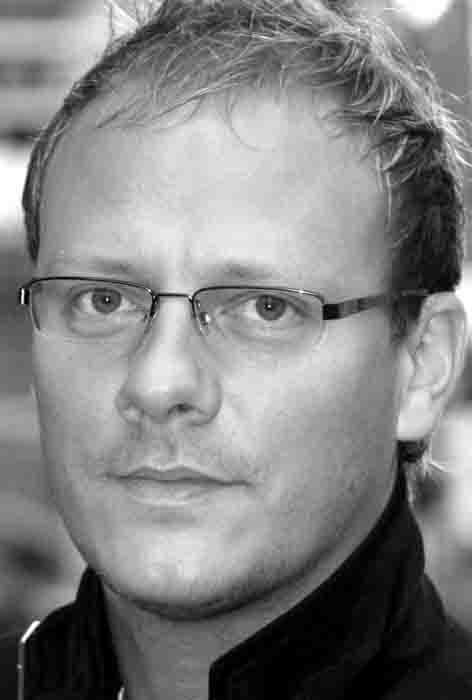
Antony Cotton (pictured) has revealed that playing Sean is easy because he just acts like himself.

Antony Cotton said that playing Sean is easy because he just has to act like himself. Speaking to The People, Cotton said that Sean looks and he sounds like him. Cotton later admitted that not all of the reviews about him are positive. Some of the gay press have accused Cotton of making Sean a stereotype. Of this he said, "You've got people like Blanche Hunt, Emily Bishop and Norris Cole and there were the classic characters like Bet Lynch and Annie Walker. They're all more camp than Sean — I'm Grant Mitchell compared to them."

In an interview with Digital Spy, Cotton was asked why Sean has always been so unlucky in love. He answered: "When I first came into the show, a lot of the old-school writers that are no longer here had never written a gay character. At that time, Raquel had just gone so they basically wrote Sean as Raquel. Hilda and Raquel are my favourite ever Corrie characters and one of the reasons that I've always loved Raquel is that she was unlucky in love. Even when she was in the gutter battered and bruised, she was always looking up at the stars thinking that the next one was around the corner. I thought that was an interesting way to play Sean, so he's always unlucky in love because Raquel was, is the short answer! That's just the way it worked out — but I like playing that."

In January 2011, it was confirmed that Charlie Condou, who played Sean's ex-boyfriend Marcus Dent between 2007 and 2008, would return to the serial. A Coronation Street spokesperson teased the upcoming reunion: "There are eventful times ahead for Sean as his old flame Marcus Dent returns to the cobbles. Marcus arrives back in Weatherfield and the relationship between him and Sean is rekindled."

In September 2014, it was revealed that Sean would begin a relationship with a vicar named Billy portrayed by Daniel Brocklebank. Producer Stuart Blackburn said: "It's about time Sean had a romance, he's been unlucky in love for a long time. Billy is a great guy who is sincere about his feelings for Sean, but his first love is and always will be God and the Church. We will be exploring this very modern relationship in the coming months and are delighted to have Daniel on board to play Billy." Cotton added: "I am thrilled that Sean is to find love again especially with this unique and exciting storyline. I'm sure it'll have its ups and downs, but that's what makes Coronation Street great. Hopefully it will be tender, funny and honest. Heaven!" In January 2015, Cotton revealed in an interview that he was surprised by the positive response to Sean's relationship with Billy storyline.

== Storylines ==
Sean is introduced as a gay colleague of Martin Platt (Sean Wilson) and Karl Foster (Chris Finch). Some months after his first appearance, Sean comes to Coronation Street, desperately looking for somewhere to live. Karl's ex-boyfriend Todd Grimshaw (Bruno Langley) recognises Sean and takes him for a drink at The Rovers. When Todd's mother Eileen Grimshaw (Sue Cleaver) meets Sean, she likes him and offers him a place to stay. Her other son, Jason Grimshaw (Ryan Thomas), is not pleased, but later warms to the idea. Sean gets a job at Underworld, where he makes friends with Fiz Brown (Jennie McAlpine) and Kelly Crabtree (Tupele Dorgu).

Violet Wilson (Jenny Platt), Sean's close friend, moves to the street and begins dating Jamie Baldwin (Rupert Hill), who Sean also becomes close to. When Jamie seems to be losing interest in Violet she fears he is secretly gay, she asks Sean to spend time with him to see if he can find out, unaware that Sean has fallen for Jamie himself. However, Sean is shocked to discover that Jamie is actually in love with his stepmother, Frankie Baldwin (Debra Stephenson). Sean supports both Violet and Jamie when Violet ends their relationship.

When Violet suffers an ectopic pregnancy, she is told her chances of conceiving have been reduced. Violet then becomes desperate to have a baby, and suggests she and Sean should consider having a child together. Sean agrees, and, despite her fertility issues, Violet becomes pregnant via self-administered artificial insemination (after the two try and fail to have sex).

Sean accompanies Violet to her 12-week scan, where he becomes attracted to the sonographer, Marcus Dent (Charlie Condou). Violet matchmakes between the two and they begin dating, although they hit a rough patch when Sean tricks Marcus into telling him Violet is expecting a baby boy, when she had wanted the gender to be a surprise.

When Violet gets back together with Jamie, she begins to find Sean's presence during the pregnancy stifling, especially after Sean lends the couple money for a flat deposit and begins coming and going as he pleases. When Violet realises she is in labour at the Rovers', it is Sean, not Jamie, at her side, as Jamie is in London.

Sean is delighted to be the first person that his son saw, and bonds with Dylan while Violet is in hospital, upsetting both her and Jamie. Sean suggests calling him "Dylan Wilson-Tully", and asks Violet to put his name on the birth certificate. Violet ignores both suggestions, naming her son "Dylan James Wilson" and putting Jamie's name on the birth certificate. Fed up with Sean being a third wheel, Jamie and Violet move to London with Dylan, devastating Sean when Violet throws her mobile away so that he cannot contact her.

Sean becomes close friends with Tom Kerrigan (Philip McGinley), a business partner of his boss, Carla Connor (Alison King) and begins to develop feelings for him. When Sean tries to kiss Tom, he tells him that he is straight, and actually interested in Sean's friend Kelly.

Realising things are awkward between Sean and Tom, Marcus questions Sean, who lies and says Tom made a pass at him rather than the other way around. Marcus angrily punches Tom, but is furious to then discover Sean was the one in the wrong. With Sean having already been jealous of Marcus's friendships with other gay men, Marcus realises there is no trust left in their relationship, and departs for London.

After joining a gym with Jason, Sean becomes attracted to fellow member Leon (Andrew Langtree). When Leon mistakenly thinks Jason is Sean's ex-boyfriend, Sean does not correct him, and is pleased that Leon seems happy to hear he is single. However, Sean is left disappointed when it turns out that Leon is actually interested in Jason and "doesn't fancy camp men".

Sean decides that he wants to track down Violet and Dylan, as his son would now be two years old. Sean finds Violet via a social networking site, and sets up a page using Liz McDonald's (Beverley Callard) identity. However, the scheme backfires when Liz finds out what Sean has done, and she fires him from the Rovers. She later softens towards Sean and reinstates him. Liz also has a word with Violet on Sean's behalf. Violet agrees to Sean visiting Dylan in London; however, on one of his visits, Sean is surprised to see Marcus at Violet's house, unaware that they were still in touch. The two realise they still have feelings for one another and reunite.

When Violet and Jamie split, Sean begins looking after Dylan more often, and Dylan lives with the pair for several weeks after Violet has a car accident. Marcus enjoys being part of Dylan's life, and suggest they adopt a child of their own, but Sean does not feel the need to have another child. The issue eventually drives the pair apart, with Sean later horrified to discover Marcus has begun a relationship with his close friend Maria Connor (Samia Ghadie), despite him having shown no interest in women before. Sean accuses Marcus of only dating Maria to become a father to her son, Liam, and the two fall out.

When Todd returns to Manchester after several years in London, Sean wonders if there is a chance for romance between them. However, Todd is only interested in getting Sean to spend money on him, turning his romantic attention towards Marcus instead. Sean is shocked when he catches Marcus cheating on Maria with Todd, and encourages him to be honest with both Maria and himself.

Depressed at being alone, Sean goes on a night out to Manchester's gay village with his colleague Sinead Tinker (Katie McGlynn), and meets Billy Mayhew (Daniel Brocklebank). The two exchange phone numbers, and meet again, but Sean is shocked when Emily Bishop (Eileen Derbyshire) introduces Billy as the new local vicar a few days later.

Although Sean struggles with Billy's job, the two begin dating, and Sean even tries to become involved with the church. However, when Emily seems distant from Billy, and unwilling to involve herself with his new ideas for the church, Sean accuses her of homophobia. Emily is upset, and denies this, telling Sean that she simply prefers more traditional church activities. Billy is angry with Sean and makes him apologise, telling Sean that he has to put his parishioners first, and that being gay in the church involves some discretion. The pair briefly split, but Emily matchmakes to bring them back together.

Sean later accompanies the Underworld staff to an awards ceremony, but events take a nasty turn when a group of racers cause the minibus driver, Steve McDonald (Simon Gregson), to swerve and crash the vehicle, which is now narrowly balancing on the edge of a quarry. Sean is one of the first people to awaken from unconsciousness and he, Steve and Julie Carp (Katy Cavanagh) escape the wreckage. Steve flees as he comes to terms with the events, while Julie re-enters the vehicle to retrieve the trapped passengers.

Sean looks after the staff once they are out, but he soon suffers a panic attack as the reality of the minibus crash dawns on him. Once everybody is out, Sean is the first person to realise that Carla is still trapped in the front seat of the minibus. Tracy Barlow (Kate Ford) risks her life to save Carla, and nearly falls to her own death when the wreckage begins to slide off the edge of the quarry, but she leaps out just in time. At the hospital, Sean is met by Billy, who reveals how proud he is of him.

== Reception ==
Cotton has won a number of awards since the character's first appearance, including a prestigious National Television Award. In 2006, he won an award for Funniest Character at the Inside Soap Awards, along with Best Actor at the British Soap Awards in 2007. He also won "Best Actor" at the 2007 Inside Soap Awards.

In 2010, Dan Martin from The Guardian put Sean on his "fantasy hit-list" of characters to be killed-off in 50th anniversary special for "setting the gay cause back 10 years", and that he believed that it would create "better drama" if the soap's scriptwriters used the accident to kill-off "major characters we're supposed to care about".
