= Joanne Jackson =

Joanne Jackson may refer to:

- Joanne Jackson (swimmer) (born 1986), British swimmer
- Joanne Jackson (Coronation Street), a fictional character from the British soap Coronation Street
- JoAnne Bratton-Jackson, soul music executive and former wife of Johnny Bratton, boxer
