= Carol Baldwin =

Carol Baldwin may refer to:

- Carol Baldwin (Coronation Street), fictional character
- Carole Baldwin, American zoologist

== See also ==
- Carolyn Baldwin
- Carolyn Baldwin McHugh
- Carl Baldwin
