= Frankie Baldwin =

Fictional character from Coronation Street

- Coronation Street character
- Portrayed by: Debra Stephenson
- Duration: 2004–2006
- First appearance: 6 June 2004
- Last appearance: 31 December 2006
- Introduced by: Tony Wood
- Spin-off appearances: Coronation Street: Pantomime (2005)
In-universe information
- Occupation: Waitress
- Husband: Danny Baldwin (until 2006); Dean Fraser (2009–present)
- Sons: Warren Baldwin
- Stepsons: Jamie Baldwin

Frankie Baldwin is a fictional character from the British ITV soap opera Coronation Street, played by Debra Stephenson. She was introduced as part of the Baldwin family along with Danny (Bradley Walsh), Jamie (Rupert Hill) and Warren Baldwin (Danny Young). She made her first appearance during the episode airing on 6 June 2004. Stephenson quit the role in 2006 and Frankie departed on screen on 31 December 2006.

== Creation and development ==
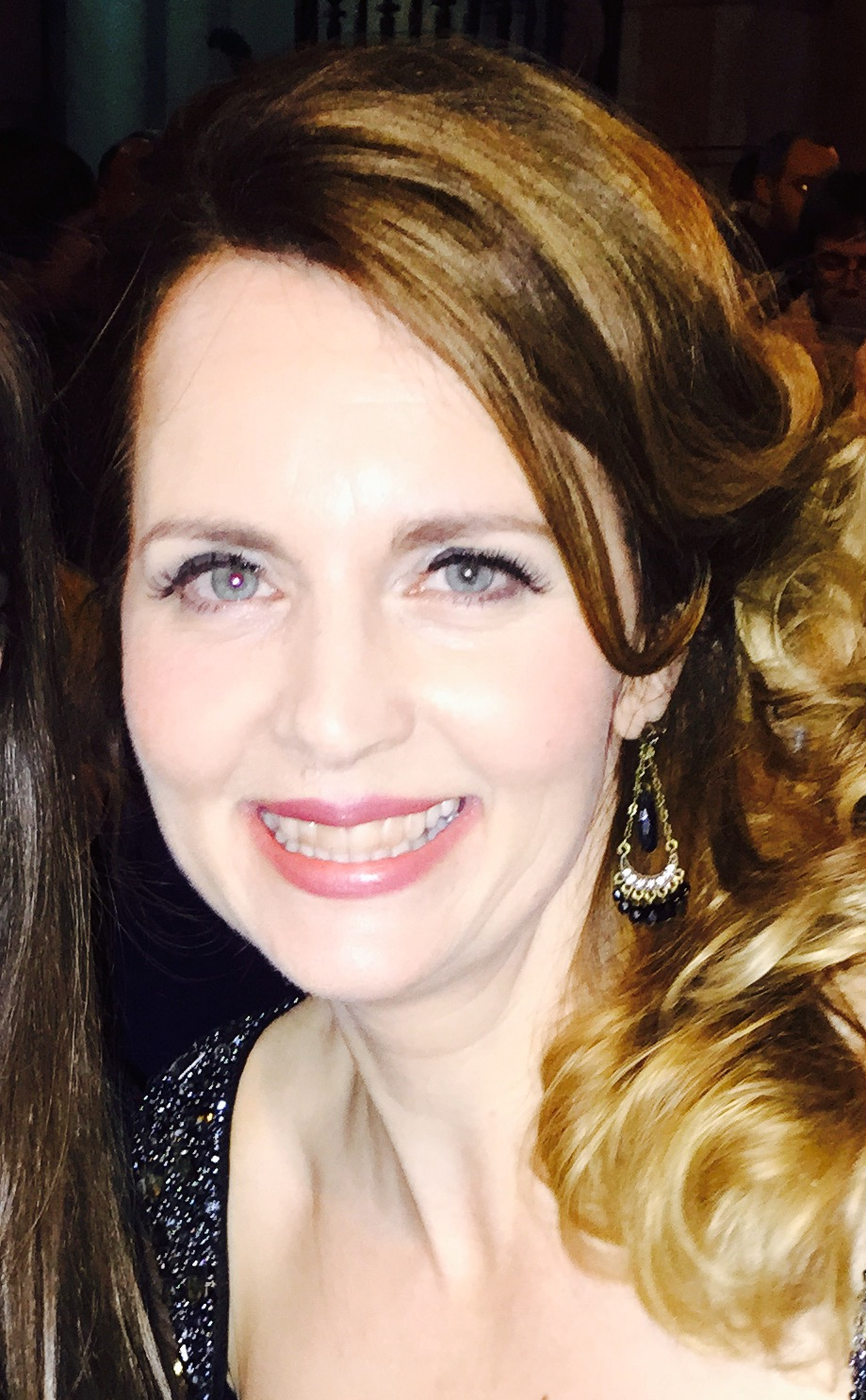
Debra Stephenson (pictured) played Frankie for two and a half years.

On 6 May 2004, it was announced that former Bad Girls actress Debra Stephenson had joined Coronation Street as Frankie.

One storyline in 2005 saw Frankie's husband Danny have an affair with Leanne Battersby (Jane Danson). Frankie later discovered the affair when she answers Leanne's mobile and finds her husband is on the other end. Danny had organised to spend another night with Leanne holed-up in a hotel room. When Leanne does not show, Danny rings her to find out where she is, but he does not realise it's his wife answering the phone. Seeing her husband's name come up on the mobile, Frankie has answered, and mimicked Leanne's voice. Danny, who has told his wife he is away on business, says he has booked the best hotel room. Frankie tells him: "It's not Leanne, it's me," and orders Danny to come home. Frankie kept the affair secret in order to protect Danny's son Jamie (Rupert Hill).

On 14 May 2006, it was announced that Stephenson had quit her role as Frankie. Stephenson said: "I had originally only planned to stay for two years but I didn't anticipate how much I would enjoy playing Frankie. I'm also keen to pursue other acting projects and I'm very excited about what the future holds." A Coronation Street spokeswoman said: "Debra has been a great asset to the show and her portrayal of Frankie Baldwin has been fantastic. However, when she joined the show we were aware that she only planned to stay for two years and we fully appreciate her reasons for leaving. We wish her every success for the future."

== Storylines ==
Glamorous Frankie meets her husband, Danny Baldwin (Bradley Walsh), when she works as a babysitter for his son Jamie (Rupert Hill). Frankie falls in love with Danny and sleeps with him, despite him still being in a relationship with his wife, Carol. They have a son of their own, Warren (Danny Young), and she also becomes close to her stepson, Jamie, after she marries Danny. He cheats on her numerous times, but she continues to forgive him until he cheats on her with Jamie's girlfriend Leanne Battersby (Jane Danson).

Upon entering Weatherfield, Frankie appears stuck-up and prissy, eager for Danny to sell the house they share in London so they can move into somewhere more suitable. Frankie explodes when she discovers Danny has slept with Sunita Parekh (Shobna Gulati), and declares war on her. This perhaps, is what draws her to Sunita's nemesis Maya Sharma (Sasha Behar). However, after learning of Maya's true nature, she apologises to Sunita and forgives her.

After a while, Frankie begins to settle into the street more, especially after striking up a bond with Vera Duckworth (Liz Dawn). When Vera is ill, Frankie takes care of her by doing her chores for her, filling in her job for her and advising her husband, Jack (Bill Tarmey), to be more sensitive and attentive, to Vera's needs. This leads to Frankie securing a permanent position at the café, where she works with her enemy Leanne.

Frankie sees Leanne as unworthy of Jamie and becomes suspicious that she is cheating on him. Frankie discovers Leanne's affair with her husband Danny when Leanne loses her phone. Leanne and Danny arrange to meet at a hotel, but Leanne cancels at the last minute. Annoyed, Danny rings her phone and says all the things he wants to do to Leanne, not aware that Frankie is on the other end of the line. Frankie chucks Danny out, and moves in with Jamie and his mother Carol (Lynne Pearson). However, after Carol accuses Frankie and Jamie of sleeping with each other, Frankie kicks Carol out, and Carol leaves the street for good.

Danny, regretting losing her and scared at the thought of spending the rest of his life with Leanne, begs Frankie to take him back. Frankie remains strong and the divorce goes ahead, with Frankie moving boyfriend Nathan in just days before. She celebrates her divorce by jetting off alone for a holiday in her newly acquired villa in Spain, and visiting her son Warren.

In October 2006, Frankie's former stepson Jamie declares his love for her at Fred Elliott's (John Savident) funeral and they kiss, but the revelation shocks her and drives her back into the arms of her ex-husband, Danny. However, she cannot resist Jamie's advances and they move forward with their relationship, much to the disgust of the other residents of the street. The news also leads to Danny's disappearance.

Frankie and Jamie decide to head to Spain to start afresh, but at the last minute on New Year's Eve 2006, Frankie gets cold feet. She ends it with a devastated Jamie, and leaves him to stay with a friend in Essex. As she departs in a taxi, Jamie is consoled by his friend Sean Tully (Antony Cotton). At midnight, Jamie receives a call from Danny, telling him he has sold the flat and he is "sorry" to hear about his breakup with Frankie.

In 2009, Roy (David Neilson) and Hayley Cropper (Julie Hesmondhalgh) are invited to Frankie's wedding to a footballer in Coronation Street: Romanian Holiday, but they arrive a week late. Frankie lets them stay in her villa while she is honeymooning.
