= Liam Connor =

Fictional character from Coronation Street

- Coronation Street character
- Portrayed by: Robert James-Collier
- Duration: 2006–2008
- First appearance: Episode 6369; 30 August 2006
- Last appearance: Episode 6928; 17 October 2008
- Created by: Steve Frost
- Book appearances: Coronation Street: The Complete Saga
In-universe information
- Occupation: Businessman
- Father: Barry Connor
- Mother: Helen Connor
- Brothers: Paul Connor
- Sisters: Michelle Connor
- Wife: Maria Sutherland (2008)
- Sons: Paul Connor Jr. Liam Connor Jr.
- Nephews: Alex Neeson; Ryan Connor (adoptive); Ruairi McDonald
- First cousins: Tom Kerrigan
- Other relatives: Carla Connor; Aidan Connor; Kate Connor; Johnny Connor; Susie Price

Liam Connor is a fictional character from the British ITV soap opera Coronation Street, played by Robert James-Collier from 2006 to 2008.

== Creation and development ==
=== Casting ===
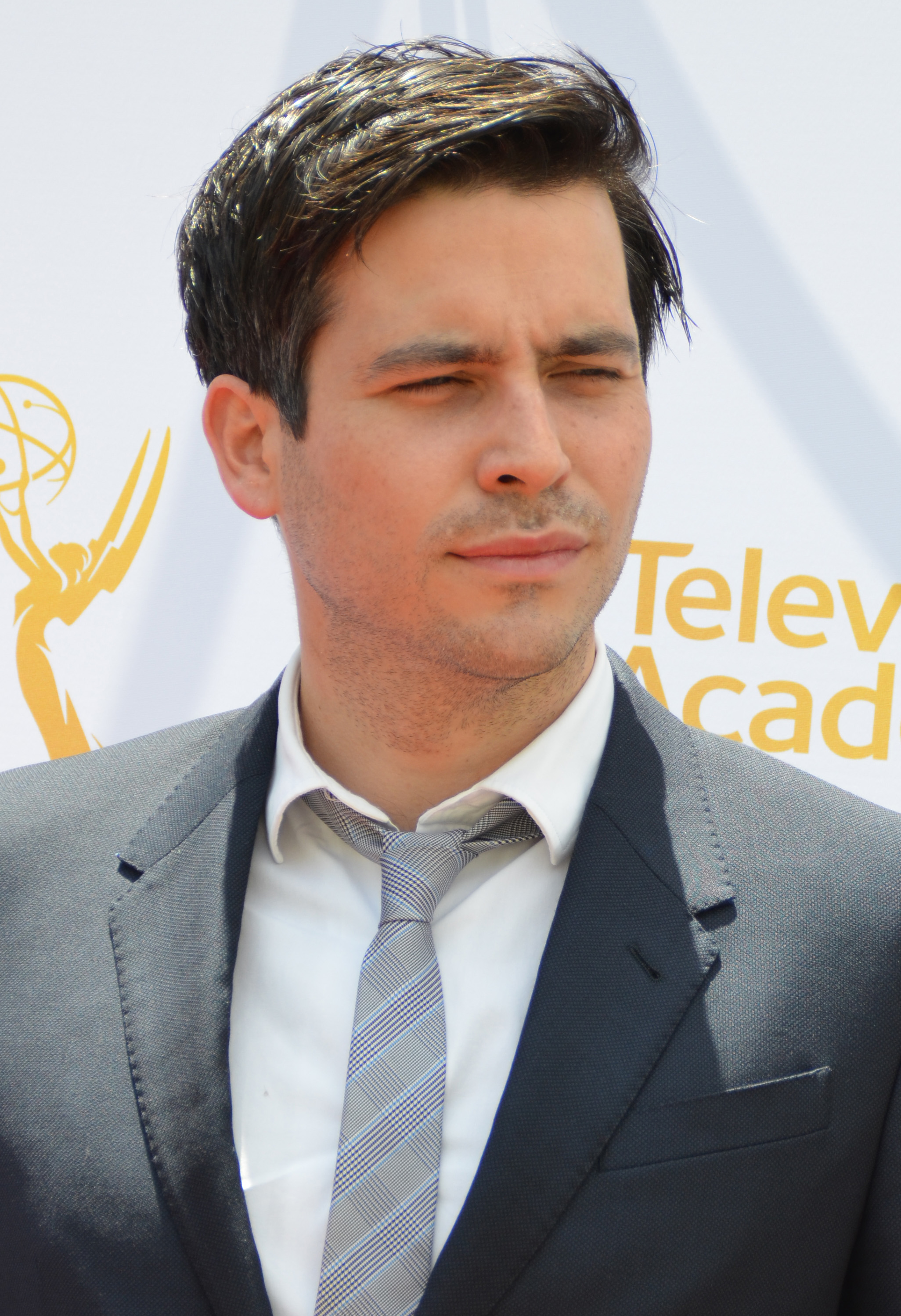
Robert James-Collier (pictured) was cast as "lovable rogue" Liam as part of the Connor family's introduction.

Coronation Street's Connor family were introduced by producer Steve Frost after Kym Marsh made a series of guest appearances as singer Michelle Connor. Marsh was soon given a regular role, and a family for her character were brought into the storyline, including a pair of brothers who were likened by newspaper reports to the Gallagher brothers from rock band Oasis and the Mitchell brothers Phil and Grant from rival soap opera EastEnders.

In July 2006, Robert James-Collier was announced as Michelle's brother Liam, described as "a loveable rogue" with "an eye for the ladies". It was said that, upon his arrival, he would set his sights on Frankie Baldwin (Debra Stephenson). James-Collier, who had worked as a marketing assistant before becoming an actor, said that the role was "a dream come true".

=== Departure ===
In February 2008, it was confirmed that James-Collier had made the decision to leave the programme, after two years portraying Liam. On his decision to leave the show, James-Collier stated that he had a fear of being typecast, and wished to experience new projects. It was later announced that the character would be killed off towards the end of the year, at the actor's personal request. Prior to his departure, the three main suspects to murder Liam include Maria Connor (Samia Ghadie), Carla Connor (Alison King) and Tony Gordon (Gray O'Brien).

Three alternative departures for the character were filmed, with only one departure being broadcast on television, though the other two were available to be viewed on the official ITV website; Liam was killed off after being hit by a car, arranged by Tony, on Tony's stag night, with the other departures including Tony pushing Liam off a balcony from a two-floored flat, and being shot by Tony during a game of paint-balling. In September 2008, producers said that a week of episodes would unfold in "real time", set over a period of 24 hours following the events leading to his impending exit.

== Storylines ==
Liam first appears in August 2006 when he and nephew Ryan Connor (Ben Thompson) visit his sister Michelle (Kym Marsh) at the Rovers Return Inn. While there, he overhears Adam Barlow (Sam Robertson) discussing his unhappiness running local factory Underworld with his half-brother, Danny Baldwin (Bradley Walsh). Liam calls on his wealthy brother Paul (Sean Gallagher) to help him purchase the factory. The brothers manage to convince the teenager to sell his 40% share for £80,000, less than half its value. Liam also briefly romances Frankie Baldwin (Debra Stephenson), putting himself in a difficult situation with Frankie's husband and the Connor brothers' new business partner, Danny (Bradley Walsh).

The death of Dean, Michelle's late partner, in a car crash, is later discovered not to have been caused by Dean's own driving, when in 2007 Liam confesses to Michelle that their brother, Paul, was driving that night, and that Paul and Liam had moved Dean's body into the driving seat so that Paul would not face criminal charges. Michelle initially disowns her brothers but reconciles with Liam after Paul's death.

Liam dates Leanne Battersby (Jane Danson), thinking that she is an estate agent but she is secretly working as a female escort. Liam's sister-in-law, Carla (Alison King), goes shopping regularly with Leanne, and one day one of Leanne's clients sees them together and asks Carla whether she is an escort, too. Carla reluctantly agrees to keep Leanne's secret from Liam.

Paul discovers Leanne's secret when he books an escort to come to a hotel room he has booked and Leanne turns up; they agree to keep each other's secret until Carla finds out, and refuses to believe that Paul and Leanne have not slept together. In an attempt to convince her, Paul kidnaps Leanne and locks her in his car boot. After jumping a red traffic light at a crossroads, Paul's Mercedes crashes into a skip and overturns. Liam rescues Leanne from the boot of the car, but Carla reveals that Leanne is working as a prostitute, and their relationship does not survive the revelation. Paul dies of his injuries in hospital and Liam is devastated by his brother's death and blames Leanne.

Liam is attracted to Maria Sutherland (Samia Longchambon), with whom he begins a casual relationship. A few weeks into their relationship, Maria discovers that she is pregnant, and they decide to abort the child. Liam is happy with this initially but after comments made by Carla, he proposes to Maria. He asks her to keep the baby and she agrees happily, unaware of Liam's hidden feelings for Carla. Maria buys Liam a dog, Ozzy. During a trip to the Lake District in January 2008, Liam falls down a ravine while searching for Ozzy. While semi-conscious, he calls out for Carla, making Maria feel insecure. In an attempt to cement their relationship, she brings their wedding forward to 11 February 2008. Liam is slightly shocked but agrees.

During an argument with Carla about her new boyfriend, Liam and Carla kiss passionately. She pulls away, leaving them confused about their feelings for each other. Liam tries to concentrate on his relationship with Maria and their baby but Carla starts interfering between him and Maria. She attempts to create opportunities to seduce Liam, such as booking a double room at a hotel for a conference they are to attend together. Carla's plans are ruined when her romantic partner Tony Gordon (Gray O'Brien) turns up at the hotel. Carla tries to warn Maria off Liam. Prior to the wedding, Maria spots Carla kissing him and almost calls off the wedding. When Maria refuses to get out of the car, he goes outside and convinces her that she is the one for him. He insists that all he wants was a life with her and their baby and they marry, even though he knows that he really loves Carla.

In April 2008, after a row with Liam about him spending the night at Carla's, Maria is horrified to discover that her baby has stopped kicking. She goes with sonographer Marcus Dent (Charlie Condou) for an emergency scan and is told that her child has died. On 30 April, still estranged from Liam, she goes into hospital and gives birth to the deceased infant. She decides not to tell Liam that she has lost the baby because she fears that Liam has married her only because she was pregnant.

Maria keeps the news of the stillbirth from Liam and stays with her colleague Audrey Roberts (Sue Nicholls). Liam finds out about his child's death from the midwife only when she calls to check on Maria. The newly married couple have a huge argument, which climaxes in Maria declaring that the marriage is over just under three months into it. With Maria leaving him, Liam sinks into depression and seeks comfort in Carla, sleeping with her. Later that day, Liam is just leaving Carla's flat when they stop in the doorway for a goodbye kiss unaware that up the road walking is their assistant Rosie Webster (Helen Flanagan). On catching glimpse of the lovers, Rosie quickly jumps out of their sight and takes a video of the tender moment before Liam drives off. Liam and Carla later agree that he will tell Maria about their relationship but instead Maria apologises for not telling him sooner that she lost the baby and asks for a second chance. That day, he tells Carla that he and Maria are back together and are off on holiday.

On their return, Carla's revenge is to insist that Liam sell his share of Underworld to Tony or she will tell Maria about them sleeping together. Liam gives in, as he and Maria are discussing trying for another baby. Bored at home all day, Liam and his cousin Tom Kerrigan (Philip McGinley) start a new business called Lad Rags. Tom, however, fails to persuade the bank to loan them £50K so he asks Carla to invest, which she does. Liam is furious when he finds out, telling Tom that her 25% share is coming out of his half of the business. Knowing that neither Tony nor Maria would be pleased about them working together, they agree to keep it a secret from them and it is clear that Liam and Carla still have strong feelings for each other.

In September 2008, Rosie decides to seduce Tony and invites him to a hotel room. When he arrives, he is stunned to find Rosie draped over the bed semi-naked and it all becomes clear to Tony what her game is. He subsequently harshly rejects Rosie, telling her he has eyes for only Carla and that she is nothing but a silly little girl. Humiliated, Rosie exacts her revenge and shows Tony the video footage of Liam and Carla kissing. Upon seeing the footage, Tony is silenced and leaves the hotel with Rosie's phone, which he later dumps in the canal after copying the video.

Initially hesitant, Tony catches Carla with Liam once again and plans his revenge. The next day, Tony surprises Carla by taking her, Liam and Maria to the lakes on a weekend away, raising suspicion with Liam and Carla, who begin to question what he is up to. At the lakes, Tony leads Liam astray on a country walk and the pair end up standing at the edge of a cave cliff with Liam clearly very anxious, as it brings back memories of his fall in the Lake District in January that year. Liam is left stunned, however, when Tony chooses that moment to ask him to be his best man at his wedding to Carla. As they hug, Tony jokingly says that he is going to push Liam over the edge, an ominous sign of Liam's fate.

The following week, upon seeing Carla in her wedding dress, Liam reignites his passion with her as they sleep together once more, with Tony almost catching them in the act as he dashes home. The next day, as the stag and hen parties are about to commence, Liam meets Carla in secret to remind her that he loves her and desperately urges her to call off the wedding. In a moment alone during her hen party, Carla sits down for a heart-to-heart with best friend Leanne, who tells her to follow her heart. Her words strike a chord and Carla finally decides she is going to end her engagement to Tony to be with Liam but when Michelle and Maria return to the table, Michelle shares her suspicion that Maria is pregnant, which she happily confirms to the group. Carla is heartbroken and, not wanting to be the one to take away the unborn child's father, urges Maria to tell Liam the news.

That night, as the boys are on a pub crawl, Liam realises he has left his wallet behind in the pub that they have just left and is told by Tony to go back and get it. However, as Liam is walking across the road, he is hit and killed instantly by a car at high speed driven by Jimmy Dockerson (Robert Beck), the man who Tony had hired to kill Liam. In tears, Tony falls to the floor, and orders everyone to move out of the way and call an ambulance. Moments after the incident, Maria arrives to tell Liam her news but is distraught to find him lying motionless on the road. Carla is forced to hold back the true extent of her own devastation as husband-to-be Tony looms over the lifeless body. Later, Tony heads to the canal and out of his pocket he pulls Liam's wallet which he had stolen earlier as part of his elaborate plan to kill his love rival. Tony then callously takes out the cash in the wallet and throws it into the water below. Liam's funeral is held on 27 October 2008.

== Reception ==
For his role as Liam, James-Collier won "Best Newcomer" at the 2007 Inside Soap Awards. The character of Liam Connor has been widely praised since his introduction. Upon his exit in 2008, columnist Jim Shelley described Liam as "the most handsome, charming, likeable character in the series". Gareth McLean of the Guardian criticised Rob James-Collier's acting skills, writing: "Apparently, Liam (Rob James-Collier) is leaving Coronation Street for fear of being type-cast. (As what? A sideboard? A life-sized wooden replica of a person?)"
