= Marcus Dent =

Fictional character from Coronation Street

- Coronation Street character
- Portrayed by: Charlie Condou
- Duration: 2007–2008, 2011–2014
- First appearance: 7 September 2007
- Last appearance: 14 July 2014
- Introduced by: Steve Frost (2007); Phil Collinson (2011)
In-universe information
- Occupation: Midwife
- Father: Ron Dent
- Mother: Janet Dent

Marcus Dent is a fictional character from the British ITV soap opera Coronation Street, played by Charlie Condou. He made his first screen appearance during the episode on 7 September 2007. Marcus departed on 5 September 2008, but returned on 24 April 2011. It was announced on 26 November 2013, that Condou would be leaving the soap, filming his final scenes in May 2014. Marcus departed on 14 July 2014.

== Development ==
=== Departure (2008) ===
In April 2008, it was announced that Condou had left the show after a year playing Marcus. A show insider said: "Charlie's very popular among the cast and he'll be missed. His character has made a big impact over the last year, quite ground-breaking really - no doubt there will be a juicy exit for Marcus. The likelihood will be a love triangle." Speaking of his departure Condou said: "I have had a fantastic time in Coronation Street, but as a jobbing actor I believe it is time to move on. There are a few things in the pipeline, one of which is a feature film which is being made abroad. But all that's under wraps at the moment." A Corrie spokeswoman said: "We'll be sad to see Charlie leave. The decision was a mutual one."

=== Return ===
In January 2011, it was confirmed that Dent would return to Coronation Street. A statement on the show's official website said: "There are eventful times ahead for Sean Tully (Antony Cotton) as his old flame Marcus Dent returns to the cobbles. Marcus arrives back in Weatherfield on 13 May 2011 and the relationship between him and Sean is rekindled." Later in 2012, Sean and Marcus split up after Marcus begins a relationship with hairdresser Maria Connor (Samia Ghadie).

=== Departure (2014) ===
In November 2013, it was announced that Condou would be leaving the soap again following a dramatic storyline for the character. The storyline sees Todd Grimshaw (Bruno Langley) setting his sights on Marcus, despite Marcus being in a relationship with Maria. Show bosses have promised that the ensuing storyline "will divide the residents of Coronation Street". Condou spoke of his departure, "I've had a fantastic time at Corrie but feel it's time for me to move on. I was only meant to return for three months and ended up staying for three years! The producers have been really supportive and are leaving the door open for Marcus which is great and my exit will certainly be explosive." Stuart Blackburn, show producer, added "I will be incredibly sad to see Charlie go and wish him well for what I know will be an exciting future."

== Storylines ==
=== 2007–2008 ===
Marcus is initially a sonographer at Weatherfield General Hospital, introduced when Violet Wilson (Jenny Platt) goes for a scan. He gives his number to Sean Tully (Antony Cotton), who is also present. The two start dating but Sean is unsure how the relationship should progress. Sean tricks Marcus into revealing the sex of the baby when he wants to know but Violet doesn't, causing a rough patch in the relationship, but it is overcome and the couple remain together happily. Marcus and Sean deliver Violet and Sean's son when Violet goes into labour in The Rovers on 22 February 2008. He is by Maria Connor's (Samia Smith) side as she gives birth to her stillborn baby in April 2008. Marcus quits his sonographer job to try to find more fulfilling employment. He and Sean plan to move into their own flat, but Sean briefly loses his job at Underworld putting their plans on hold.

On 27 August 2008, Eileen Grimshaw (Sue Cleaver) receives a call from her son, Todd Grimshaw (Bruno Langley) saying that he has seen Marcus in a nightclub in London with another man. Eileen subsequently tells Sean, who initially dismisses it, but then becomes increasingly more paranoid and angry. When Marcus discovers that Sean has made a pass at Tom Kerrigan (Philip McGinley), he punches Tom as he suspects that Sean has slept with him. Marcus later tells Sean that he is fed up of his jealousy and calls a cab to take him to London. Sean pleads with Marcus but he says an emotional goodbye to Eileen and Maria, as well as Maria's husband Liam Connor (Rob James-Collier) before departing for London, leaving Sean devastated. When he leaves, he promises to keep in touch with Eileen and Maria as he has been through so much.

=== 2011–2014 ===
In April 2011, Sean visits Violet, Jamie Baldwin (Rupert Hill) and Dylan in London. After seeing them argue, he decides to join Dylan in the kitchen and is shocked to find Marcus there. They agree to put the past behind them and have a day out together with Dylan. When they return, they see Jamie leaving and try to comfort Violet but Sean leaves as Violet is hostile, accusing him of trying to steal Dylan from her. As Sean gets on the coach and the coach leaves, Marcus arrives with some flowers, but is too late.

Several weeks later, Marcus returns to Weatherfield and catches up with Sean and Eileen and meets Julie Carp (Katy Cavanagh) and Izzy Armstrong (Cherylee Houston). He announces that he has a job interview and is hoping to stay in Weatherfield. Eileen organizes a blind date for Sean which turns out to be Marcus, and they go on a date to Nick Tilsley's (Ben Price) bar, Marcus later kisses Sean and they decide to give their relationship another go.

In June, Sean hears that Violet has been injured in a car crash and needs someone to look after Dylan. He decides that he should look after Dylan but does not tell Marcus as he had recently booked a holiday. However, Eileen tells Marcus about Dylan and Marcus supports Sean and they decide to go and collect Dylan but after Jason Grimshaw (Ryan Thomas) makes a remark about Sean and Dylan, causing Sean to have second thoughts but Marcus eventually persuades him to go and get Dylan. Dylan stays with them until Violet has recovered from her injuries, sparking a desire in Marcus for a child of his own but Sean is not interested. Marcus tries to pretend that being part-time dad to Dylan and helping Maria with Liam is enough but he and Sean disagree about this and split up. Marcus stays with Maria, Kirk and Liam for a while and talks about going back to London but Maria persuades him to stay.

In October 2012, Marcus knows that something is wrong with Maria and she eventually admits that she has found a lump in her breast. Fearing it could be breast cancer, Marcus goes with Maria to the hospital. Maria does not have cancer. They kiss, much to Marcus's surprise. They pretend it never happened and go to Eileen's birthday party, especially as Maria is dating Jason and Marcus is dating a colleague, Aiden Lester (Toby Sawyer). Eventually, they admit their feelings for each other and end their respective relationships. Aiden, angry that Marcus agreed to move to London with him and then changed his mind, assumes Sean has been causing trouble. Sean gets the impression that Marcus wants him back and is horrified to find Marcus kissing Maria. He struggles to accept that Marcus is now in an opposite-sex relationship and tells Jason, who is furious that they lied to him. In November 2013, Marcus and Maria decide to buy a house together, away from the street so that there are things like boating lakes and playgrounds for Liam. Marcus feels uncomfortable when Jason's gay brother, Todd, makes a pass at him. The next day, he admits to Todd that he has everything he needs and is happy with Maria. However, Todd thinks that Marcus fancies him and kisses him. They have sex, despite Marcus instantly regretting it. Todd's mother, Eileen, is convinced that Todd and Marcus are having an affair and tricks Marcus into admitting it. Todd later accompanies Marcus to a show house where he waits for Maria, but the pair end up having sex again. Maria and her friend Audrey Roberts (Sue Nicholls) walk in on them, which leaves Marcus horrified. As Marcus later tries to explain himself, Maria lashes out, attacking him and ends their relationship for good. He is then offered a room at Todd's aunt Julie's flat, but decides to leave Weatherfield. Marcus returns and he and Todd begin a relationship, much to Maria's annoyance. Maria goes on a downward spiral and begins to secretly text Tyrone Dobbs (Alan Halsall) pretending to be Kirsty Soames (Natalie Gumede), Tyrone's ex-fiancée. After having some time off work, Marcus is called in by his boss for a meeting at work. Marcus is suspended for having too much time off as his relationship with Maria gets back on track and he begins to see Liam again. Marcus is later shocked to see his partner Todd kissing another man, making Marcus realize there is nothing left for him in Weatherfield and he decides to leave, after reconciling with Maria. He later leaves for London, after an emotional farewell with Maria, Liam and Julie.
