= Violet Wilson =

Fictional character from Coronation Street

- Coronation Street character
- Portrayed by: Jenny Platt
- Duration: 2004–2008, 2011, 2024
- First appearance: 8 October 2004
- Last appearance: 10 April 2024
- Introduced by: Tony Wood (2004); Phil Collinson (2011); Iain MacLeod (2024)
In-universe information
- Occupation: Barmaid
- Sisters: Lauren Wilson
- Sons: Dylan Wilson

Violet Wilson is a fictional character from the British ITV soap opera Coronation Street. She was portrayed by Jenny Platt making her first on-screen appearance on 8 October 2004 and remained until 29 February 2008. Platt returned for one episode on 24 April 2011, and returned again on 20 March 2024 for a short stint.

== Creation and development ==
=== Background ===
Violet first appeared on 8 October 2004; the character was originally going to be called Julie. Platt started filming in August 2004. In late 2004, it was also claimed that Violet would reveal to her new love interest, Jason Grimshaw (Ryan Thomas), that she was HIV positive, but for unknown reasons, this storyline never went through.

In 2007, Sunday Newspaper The People reported that Platt had quit the serial. However, the serial's producers denied the reports and a spokesperson confirmed on Digital Spy that she had signed a new one-year contract taking her through to March 2008.

Platt returned to the serial for one episode in 2011.

=== Pregnancy ===
In one storyline, Violet falls pregnant to Jamie Baldwin. Platt commented on the way she handled the delicate storyline offscreen stating: "Obviously, I wanted to find out about it. Violet actually doesn't know anything about it - she just wakes up in the hospital and is told about it, so I kind of didn't need it. It wasn't like I got diagnosed and had to live with it for a while. By the time I've woken up everything's gone. But, just for my own interest, I did, I looked into it and found out a bit about it. I looked at the NHS site to find out what the symptoms would be, and how common it is, all that kind of stuff."

=== Cancelled lesbian storyline ===
After the character had left the show it was later revealed that the soap's bosses had been on the look out for a lesbian character since 2004, the year that the character entered the series. The original intentions were revealed for the character, that were to make her the soap's first lesbian character. Due to the popularity of her two relationships within the character's early storylines the idea was scrapped at the last minute. An ITV insider told the News of the World in July 2008: "Executives want to create a soap which is representative of society in 2008 and they are acutely aware they need more gay characters. They went on: "It does seem ridiculous it (lesbianism) has never been explored on Corrie but that's all about to change." Later it was revealed that the producers had shifted the plans, which they had once put onto Platt's character, onto fellow character Sophie Webster.

=== 2024 return ===
On 12 February 2024, it was announced that Platt would be reprising her role as Violet for a "dark storyline" regarding the repercussions of Violet's son, Dylan Wilson's (Liam McCheyne), bullying storyline. Platt's co-star, Antony Cotton, who portrays Dylan's father Sean Tully, revealed the soap had been trying to get Platt to return as Violet in "various different ways" due to the Dylan's presence in the soap. It was also revealed that Violet's return would only be temporary, though Cotton hoped that she would return again. Cotton was happy about Platt's return due to the pair being friends in real life, though he speculated that she may be nervous due to the different set up of the soap. Platt was expected to film for about four weeks. Violet's first reappearance aired on 20 March 2024. Prior to Platt's return, Violet had been mentioned onscreen, with Sean often being shown as going to visit the character. It was teased that upon her return, Violet and Sean would blame each other over Dylan's behaviour.

== Storylines ==
Violet arrives on the Street in October 2004, as a barmaid in the Rovers Return Inn. A former pupil of Ken Barlow (William Roache) when he was a teacher at Weatherfield Comprehensive, she addresses him as "Sir" during her time on the Street. Violet befriends neighbour Katy Harris (Lucy-Jo Hudson) and is good friends with Sean Tully (Antony Cotton), whom she knew before moving to Coronation Street. Violet begins a relationship with Jason Grimshaw (Ryan Thomas), whose mother Eileen (Sue Cleaver) finds Violet a pleasant young woman. After some unease by Violet, who states that she had left home at a young age to live with an older, dominant man, she moves into 11 Coronation Street with Jason. They break up after Violet is seduced by Charlie Stubbs (Bill Ward), but reunite. The relationship breaks up when Jason has an affair with Sarah Platt (Tina O'Brien). Jason proposes to Violet but she turns him down.

Violet soon begins dating Jamie Baldwin (Rupert Hill). She moves in with him but after a while she starts to doubt Jamie's loyalties in September 2006, when he begins spending more time with Sean, than her and worries that Jamie is interested in Sean, who is gay. Violet asks Sean to find out if Jamie is gay but Sean discovers that Jamie is having an affair with his stepmother Frankie (Debra Stephenson). Violet discovers she is pregnant in December with Jamie's baby and tells him but is shocked and disgusted when he confesses the truth about his affair with Frankie and is further upset when she discovers Sean's knowledge of the affair. Violet suffers an ectopic pregnancy on New Years Day 2007, and has to have emergency surgery to remove her fallopian tube and the stillborn baby. She is then told that she has a reduced chance of conceiving.

While drunk, Violet and Sean make a pact - if they are both single and childless by 30, they will have a child together. Violet ponders over this, and agrees to try for a child together immediately, due to Violet's reduced fertility. In July 2007, Violet finds out she is expecting Sean's baby. When Violet tells Sean, he is thrilled that she is going to be a mother. Violet makes him keep it secret for the first 12 weeks but Sean is so excited about Violet's pregnancy, he tells Jamie. Violet is angry and upset when she finds out. Sean tricks his boyfriend - sonographer Marcus Dent (Charlie Condou) - into telling him that Violet is expecting a baby boy. He wants to know the sex of the baby but Violet doesn't. He tells Jason and Jamie about Violet expecting a boy and Jason accidentally lets slip to Violet. She is furious with Sean for betraying her and making her feel worthless. Sean soon discovers that Violet is planning to bring up their baby without him, and when he confronts her about being pushed out, she tells him that she sees him as the donor, not the father. Upset, he warns Violet that he will take legal action, and she walks out in a rage. Violet and Sean later apologise to one another and the friendship is rekindled.

Violet reunites with Jamie shortly after attending his mother Carol's wedding in Birmingham as his date. After restarting the relationship, they move in together and both agree to bring up the baby together. Violet goes into labour on 22 February 2008 whilst in Rovers with Sean by her side and names her newborn son Dylan. She is unhappy about the situation as Jamie is away, moving some of their belongings down to London. Sean quickly bonds with Dylan and is ecstatic to be a dad but Violet, however, is sad that Sean has bonded with the baby since she can't take Dylan away from him. The following week Violet proposes and Jamie accepts straight away and they prepare to leave Manchester but Violet's sister Lauren (Lucy Evans) alerts Sean after she sees Jamie loading up the car. Sean tries to stop Violet but she and Jamie speed away. Sean phones Violet, but she throws her mobile out of the car, making sure Sean cannot contact them.

Two years later, Sean decides that he wants to make contact with Dylan and sets out to do so by making contact with Violet via social networking site Facescene, similar to Facebook. Knowing that Violet does not want any contact with him, he sets up a page under Liz McDonald's (Beverley Callard) name and asks her to e-mail some pictures of Dylan, who is now two years old. Violet does so and confesses to 'Liz' that she feels bad for alienating Sean, to which 'Liz' berates Violet for doing so. Upset, Violet rings The Rovers, demanding answers from Liz. Liz discovers Sean's deception and fires him, but reinstates him when she realises how upset and desperate he was to see his son and then phones Violet back, asking her to let Sean see Dylan to which she accepts. Sean travels to London in April 2011 to visit Dylan and discovers Violet and Jamie arguing. He and Marcus who have recently reconciled, take Dylan out for the day and when they return, they witness Jamie leaving in a taxi. They try to comfort Violet, but she is homophobic towards Sean and they leave. Violet is later injured in a crash and is hospitalised with back problems and her grandmother rings Sean and requests that he look after Dylan. Sean is worried at first but is able to connect with him. After several months, Violet calls Sean, telling him she is ready to have Dylan back and he is reluctant, however she agrees he and Marcus can visit him anytime they want.

== Reception ==
A writer from Inside Soap called Violet's 2024 return "short and sweet" and added that she would "love" for the character to return again.
