= Jamie Baldwin =

Fictional character from Coronation Street

- Coronation Street character
- Portrayed by: Rupert Hill
- Duration: 2004–2008, 2011
- First appearance: Episode 5805; 19 July 2004
- Last appearance: Episode 7585; 24 April 2011
- Introduced by: Tony Wood (2004); Phil Collinson (2011)
In-universe information
- Occupation: Taxi driver
- Father: Danny Baldwin
- Mother: Carol Baldwin
- Stepmother: Frankie Baldwin
- Half-brothers: Warren Baldwin
- Adoptive sons: Dylan Wilson
- Grandfathers: Mike Baldwin
- Grandmothers: Viv Baldwin
- Uncles: Mark Redman; Adam Barlow

Jamie Baldwin is a fictional character from the British ITV soap opera Coronation Street, played by Rupert Hill. He first appeared in 2004 and left in 2008, returning briefly in 2011.

== Development and Reception ==
=== Relationships ===
The 2006 storyline involving the death of Jamie's on-screen grandfather, Mike Baldwin, from Alzheimer's disease inspired actor Rupert Hill to raise funds for charities supporting individuals diagnosed with the condition.

In 2005, Jamie begins dating Joanne Jackson, an employee of his grandfather Mike, in an attempt to prove to his former fiancée, Leanne Battersby, that he has moved on from their relationship. Recalling that Joanne was infatuated with him, he begins flirting with her to demonstrate this, though their initial date proves highly unsuccessful. Hill noted that the romance was a clear rebound for Jamie, describing it as a "flat affair" for which the character was emotionally unready. Hill explained that Jamie's primary motivation was simply to distract himself from Leanne by seeing someone else, though he said that Jamie did grow to genuinely like Joanne despite the actor's doubts that they would ever marry. Although the pair eventually begin enjoying each other's company, they ultimately choose not to pursue a serious relationship so soon after Jamie's breakup and due to the ongoing complications surrounding his alcoholic mother, Carol Baldwin.

Discussing the controversial romantic storyline between Jamie and his stepmother Frankie Baldwin, Hill admitted that both he and co-star Debra Stephenson were initially apprehensive about filming the scenes, fearing the plot would feel overly sensationalist. However, he noted that the scripts ultimately provided a compelling new dimension to their character's relationship, later describing the storyline as "fantastic."

=== Departure and return ===
On 16 April 2007, a spokesperson for Coronation Street confirmed that Hill had decided to leave the soap opera after his contract expired. The level of fame associated with appearing in the serial never appealed to Hill, motivating his exit alongside a desire to pursue a wider variety of acting roles. Co-star Jenny Platt also announced her departure from the series at the same time. Reflecting on his tenure in May 2010, Hill admitted to the Birmingham Post that leaving the show was a significant professional risk, stating: "I got paid incredibly well, and starring in Coronation Street was a very enjoyable job, and I made really good friends. But I've always wanted to be an actor. And part of what attracted me to the profession was the diversity of roles you can get. In the end I accepted that I was going to have to take a pay cut and face up to the possibility that I might never work again. It didn't matter, though. I had to take a risk and leave Corrie in 2007 because I didn't want to play Jamie Baldwin for the next 25 years".

In March 2011, the show executives announced that Hill and Platt would return as Jamie and Violet for one episode set in London in which Sean Tully would go to find them. A Coronation Street spokesperson stated: "It will be a real treat for Corrie viewers to see Sean exploring the sights of London, whilst at the same time Todd returns to Weatherfield to catch up with his mum. Sean is desperate to be a real dad to Dylan so when Violet says he can visit he is thrilled, but when he arrives in the capital he is in for a few surprises."

== Storylines ==
Shortly after his arrival in Weatherfield, Jamie begins dating Leanne Battersby. He leaves her briefly for Maria Sutherland before reconciling with Leanne, who subsequently embarks on a secret affair with Jamie's father, Danny Baldwin. Upon discovering the betrayal, Jamie terminates the relationship and disowns his father. When Jamie's mother, Carol, arrives in town, Jamie supports her recovery from alcoholism; however, Carol continuously attempts to sabotage his close bond with his stepmother, Frankie. Following a brief, unsuccessful rebound romance with Joanne Jackson, Jamie and Frankie permanently evict and disown Carol after she maliciously insinuates that the two share an improper romantic attraction.

Jamie later begins a relationship with Violet Wilson, who moves in with him, though their partnership is heavily strained by Jamie's hidden feelings for Frankie. After separating from Violet following a holiday abroad, Jamie confesses his love to Frankie, and the two begin a secret affair. The relationship is exposed when Danny catches them in bed together, culminating in a violent physical confrontation where Danny leaves Jamie unconscious in a local canal before immediately diving in to rescue him.

Following the confrontation, a guilt-ridden Danny signs his business assets over to Jamie and disappears. Jamie confesses the affair to a pregnant Violet, leaving her devastated. He and Frankie arrange to relocate to Spain to start a new life, but Frankie changes her mind at the last minute and departs Weatherfield alone. Jamie later finds employment as a driver for the taxi firm StreetCars. Although he initially objects to Violet's plan to conceive and raise a child with her friend Sean Tully, Jamie later apologizes for his attitude. He and Violet subsequently reconcile, agreeing to resume their relationship and raise the child together in London, intentionally planning to exclude Sean from the upbringing. Violet proposes marriage to Jamie, which he accepts.

As the couple attempts a clandestine departure from the street, Violet's sister Lauren discovers their plan and alerts Sean. Despite attempts by Sean and his partner Marcus Dent to intercept the car, Jamie and Violet successfully flee the area and cut off all communication. In April 2011, Sean tracks them down in London and witnesses Jamie and Violet locked in a bitter argument. Jamie reveals that Violet has had an affair with a gardener before departing the residence in a taxi, with Violet subsequently confirming to Sean that her relationship with Jamie has permanently ended.
