= Danny Baldwin =

Fictional character from Coronation Street

- Coronation Street character
- Portrayed by: Bradley Walsh
- Duration: 2004–2006
- First appearance: 31 May 2004
- Last appearance: 31 December 2006
- Introduced by: Tony Wood
- Spin-off appearances: Coronation Street: Pantomime (2005)
In-universe information
- Occupation: Businessman
- Father: Mike Baldwin
- Mother: Viv Baldwin
- Half-brothers: Mark Redman; Adam Barlow
- Wife: Carol Saunders (backstory); Frankie Baldwin (until 2006)
- Sons: Jamie Baldwin; Warren Baldwin
- Grandfathers: Frank Baldwin
- Grandmothers: Mary Baldwin
- Uncles: Harry Baldwin

Danny Baldwin is a fictional character from the British ITV soap opera Coronation Street, played by Bradley Walsh. The character first appeared on 31 May 2004 and made his departure on 31 December 2006.

== Creation and development ==
Bradley Walsh revealed that the character was originally to have been called "Vic Baldwin", but that he asked the producers if the name could be changed to that of his own father, who had recently died.

== Storylines ==
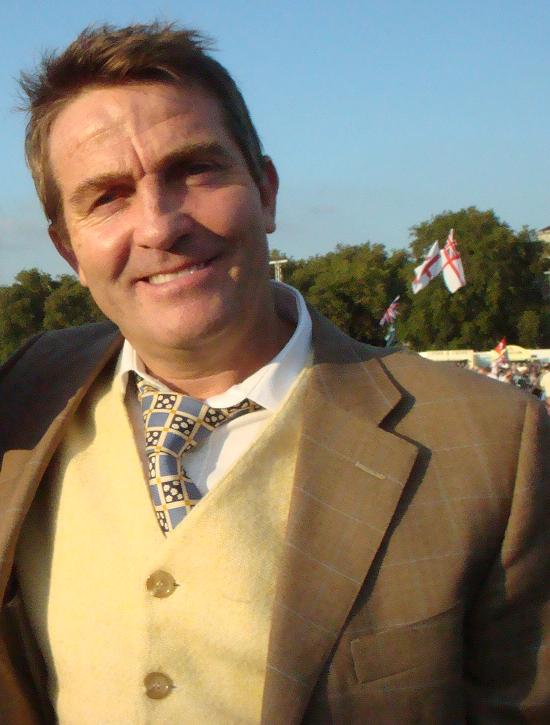
Bradley Walsh (pictured) asked producers to change his character's name from 'Vic' to 'Danny', out of respect to his late father.

Danny Baldwin moves to Weatherfield to help his father Mike Baldwin (Johnny Briggs) with his business, Underworld. Not long afterwards, his wife Frankie Baldwin (Debra Stephenson), who had previously cheated on him, arrives in Weatherfield as she wants to give their marriage another chance. They are soon joined by Danny's two sons, Warren Baldwin (Danny Young) and Jamie Baldwin (Rupert Hill). Unaware of Frankie's intentions, Danny has a brief fling with shop assistant Sunita Parekh (Shobna Gulati) shortly after his arrival, but Sunita does not know that Danny is married and is very hurt when Frankie turns up. The Baldwins then rent No. 7 Coronation Street from Blanche Hunt (Maggie Jones).

Danny's uncle Harry dies, and his mother, Viv, (Patricia Brake), comes to stay and reveals to Mike and Danny a secret she had kept since his birth: Harry's brother Mike is actually Danny's biological father, the product of an affair. His ex-wife Carol (Lynne Pearson) arrives after regaining contact with Jamie against his wishes. Danny soon embarks on a passionate affair with Jamie's girlfriend Leanne Battersby (Jane Danson). When this is finally revealed, Jamie is heartbroken. Frankie throws Danny out and he moves in with Leanne.

Mike becomes ill with Alzheimer's disease. Danny is initially determined to use Mike's illness to gain control of the factory and Mike's other assets and manages to get power of attorney; however, as Mike's condition deteriorates, Danny's emotions get the better of him and he is genuinely upset at the decline of his dad. Mike eventually dies in April 2006, and Danny is left distraught by the outcome. Leanne, now engaged to Danny, finds a more recent will amongst Mike's belongings in which he leaves everything to his youngest son, Adam Barlow (Sam Robertson). Thereafter Leanne uses the will to blackmail Danny, demanding £100,000 and leaves Weatherfield after Danny throws her out. Danny continues to try to reconcile with Frankie, and nearly succeeds; but is shocked and appalled to discover that Frankie is having an affair with Jamie. Afterwards, Danny goes on a downwards spiral and sells his share of the factory to Paul Connor (Sean Gallagher) - who had already bought Adam's share - and leaves Weatherfield for Spain. He is last seen with a beautiful woman on his arm, where he phones Jamie to wish him a Happy New Year.

== Reception ==
A writer from Inside Soap called the character "comical".
