= Entity (2012 film) =

- Directed by: Steve Stone
- Written by: Steve Stone
- Produced by: Steve Stone; Rob Speranza
- Starring: Dervla Kirwan; Charlotte Riley; Branko Tomovic
- Cinematography: Alex Veitch
- Edited by: Kevin Tams
- Music by: Dave S. Walker
- Production companies: Nexus DNA; EM Media
- Distributed by: Fangoria Films; Darclight Films
- Release date: 25 October 2012 (Bram Stoker International Film Festival)
- Running time: 87 minutes
- Country: United Kingdom
- Language: English

Entity is a 2012 British supernatural thriller film written and directed by Steve Stone. The film had its world premiere on 25 October 2012, at the Bram Stoker International Film Festival. It stars Dervla Kirwan, Charlotte Riley, and Branko Tomovic and centers upon a British reality show film crew that encounters a dark entity.

== Plot ==
In 2010, a film crew for the British television show Darkest Secrets enter a remote Siberian forest known for the unexplained deaths of thirty-four unidentified people in 1998. The crew includes Kate Hansen, the host; Matt Hurst, the camera man; and David Hamilton, a tech. Ruth Peacock, a psychic, and Yuri Levkov, a Russian author, join them. After searching the woods for the site of the massacre, Ruth suddenly makes contact with several ghosts, who speak to her in Russian. In a vision, Ruth sees Russian military figures execute prisoners and is overwhelmed by the experience. Ruth tells them that they must go further east toward what Yuri says is an abandoned facility. On the way, Ruth sees more visions of Russian soldiers murdering helpless prisoners, this time at the facility, and she urges them onward.

When they enter the facility, they hear distant, echoing screams. Ruth suggests that they turn back, but Kate convinces her to continue. Inside the facility, they discover cages and cells. Ruth once again hears Russian voices, and Yuri translates them as a warning to leave. When Ruth enters one of the rooms, visions of torture overwhelm her, and she says that the victims were psychics like her. An entity harasses them in a hallway, and Ruth tells them to remain calm, as it feeds off of their reactions. In one of the cells, Ruth detects a powerful psychic force, and she attempts to make contact with it; Yuri translates for her. Ruth identifies the presence as Mischka, a dead prisoner who was tortured by the soldiers. When Mischka turns hostile, they flee the cell and realize that David has gone missing.

The group retreats to a control room, where they examine their footage. In it, they see fleeting images of both Mischka and David. Matt insists that they find David, but Ruth is exhausted and needs to rest. Before she falls asleep, Ruth says that Yuri has been here before. Yuri admits that he knew of the facility and its history of brutal military experiments on psychics, but he needed to know if Ruth was capable of finding it. When Kate hears David's voice, she and Matt go off to find him, and Yuri watches over Ruth as she sleeps. Mischka kills David in front of Matt and Kate, and they flee back to the control room. There, Yuri has taken Ruth hostage and demanded that she help him free the spirit of his lost girlfriend, whom he believes to have been killed here.

As they go deeper into the facility, Mischka becomes increasingly hostile despite Ruth's attempts to communicate with him. Yuri sees the ghost of his girlfriend, but when he approaches her, Mischka savagely beats and kills him. Ruth orders Matt and Kate to leave the facility, and she tries once again to make contact with Mischka. As they're about to leave, Kate turns back to help Ruth, and Matt reluctantly follows. They find Ruth on the floor in Mischka's cell. Ruth weakly explains that she has helped Mischka to cross over, and the facility is now safe. Relieved, Kate and Matt split up to recover their equipment. After she sees suspicious footage of Ruth's battle with Mischka, Kate becomes concerned for Matt, only to find him dead. Ruth, possessed by Mischka, kills Kate. Kate then realizes that she and the rest of the crew are now doomed to forever wander through the facility with the rest of the ghosts.

== Cast ==
- Dervla Kirwan as Ruth Peacock
- Charlotte Riley as Kate Hansen
- Branko Tomovic as Yuri Levkov
- Rupert Hill as Matt Hurst
- Oliver Jackson as David Hamilton
- Michael David Worden as Mischka

== Production ==
Shooting took place in Selby, North Yorkshire, England. Tomovic's character was originally a 50-year-old British professor, but the character was rewritten to be an Eastern European to better fit Tomovic. Hill shot most of the POV footage himself. Tomovic was cast after writer-director Stone saw him in Whitechapel.

== Reception ==
HorrorNews.net praised various elements of Entity but stated "Had ENTITY come a lot earlier in the cycle it would have stood out a lot more; it remains a superior example of its type but it simply doesn’t have anything new to offer." Starburst magazine gave a mixed review, saying that the film "is not without its charms" but that ultimately the pacing was slow and the ending predictable. Nia Edwards-Behi of Brutal As Hell called it "truly refreshing" and "a technically brilliant feat of independent filmmaking".

=== Awards ===
- Best Low Budget Film at the London Independent Film Festival (2013, won)
- Best Sci-Fi/Horror Feature at the London Independent Film Festival (2013, won)
