= Jenny Platt =

English actress

- Born: Jennifer Platt; 24 September 1979 (age 47); Ipswich, Suffolk, England
- Education: East 15 Acting School
- Occupation: Actress
- Years active: 1988, 2003–present
- Television: Coronation Street (2004–2008, 2011, 2024); Versailles (2018)
- Spouse: Rupert Hill (m. 2013)
- Children: 1

Jennifer Platt (born 24 September 1979) is an English actress best known for her role as Violet Wilson in the long-running television soap Coronation Street and her role as Jeanne in Versailles.

== Early life ==
Platt was born in Ipswich, Suffolk. She attended Mablethorpe Primary School, Lincolnshire, until 1991.

== Career ==
Platt trained at East 15 Acting School, and has appeared in many theatre roles. Her first appearance in Coronation Street was on 8 October 2004. Prior to the role of Violet, she had small roles in TV series' including The Bill, Where the Heart Is and Foyle's War.

In September 2008, Platt appeared in The Merchant of Venice playing the role of Narissa at the Octagon Theatre in Bolton until the run ended in November 2008.

Broadcast on 24 April 2011 (Easter Sunday), Jenny Platt made a brief appearance as Violet in a special edition of Coronation Street feature episode which featured Sean Tully (played by Antony Cotton) travelling to London to visit his baby son, Dylan. Other cast to appear in the feature episode were Charlie Condou (playing Marcus Dent), Bruno Langley (playing Todd Grimshaw) and Rupert Hill (playing Jamie Baldwin).

On 11 February 2012, Platt appeared in Casualty playing Tracey, a hotel cleaner.

In 2023, Platt appeared in Waterloo Road playing Rose Massey.

== Personal life ==
Platt married her former Coronation Street co-star Rupert Hill in 2013. Together they have a daughter.
