= Todd Grimshaw =

Fictional character from Coronation Street

- Coronation Street character
- Gareth Pierce as Todd Grimshaw
- Portrayed by: Bruno Langley (2001–2017); Gareth Pierce (2020–present)
- Duration: 2001–2004; 2007; 2011; 2013–2017; 2020–present
- First appearance: 14 January 2001
- Introduced by: Jane MacNaught (2001); Steve Frost (2007); Phil Collinson (2011); Stuart Blackburn (2013); Iain MacLeod (2020)
- Book appearances: Coronation Street: The Complete Saga
- Crossover appearances: Corriedale (2026)
In-universe information
- Occupation: Hospital porter; Law clerk; Accounting clerk; Switch operator; Salesman; Pawnbroker; Florist; Sales Executive; Funeral director
- Father: Duncan
- Mother: Eileen Grimshaw
- Stepfather: Pat Phelan
- Half-brothers: Jason Grimshaw
- Husband: Theo Silverton (2026)
- Sons: Billy Platt
- Stepsons: Miles Silverton
- Stepdaughters: Millie Silverton
- Grandfathers: Colin Grimshaw
- Aunts: Julie Carp
- Other relatives: Arnley Grimshaw; Elsie Tanner; Linda Cheveski; Dennis Tanner; Paul Cheveski

Todd Grimshaw is a fictional character from the British ITV soap opera Coronation Street, formerly played by Bruno Langley from 2001 to 2017, and now played by Gareth Pierce. The character's debut was broadcast on 14 January 2001. He was introduced as part of the Grimshaw family, formed around the established character Eileen Grimshaw (Sue Cleaver).

Todd was the programme's first gay character, which generated much coverage in the British media. The coming out storyline was credited with helping Coronation Street portray a more accurate depiction of society in the 21st century.

The character's storylines have mainly focused on his relationships with Sarah Platt (Tina O'Brien), Karl Foster (Chris Finch), Marcus Dent (Charlie Condou) and Billy Mayhew (Daniel Brocklebank). Langley decided to leave the show in 2004 but returned for brief appearances in 2007 and 2011. The actor agreed to reprise the role on a permanent basis in 2013. Todd remained a part of the series until Langley's contract was terminated following legal issues in 2017. It was announced in July 2020 that Todd was to return, with the role having been recast to Pierce; Todd returned on 9 October 2020.

== Development ==
=== Family ===
The Grimshaws are often portrayed as arguing rivals in their scenes. Todd and his eldest brother Jason Grimshaw (Ryan Thomas) are portrayed as "bickering brothers". Jason is often cheeky to their mother, Eileen Grimshaw (Sue Cleaver). Thomas told a reporter from Soaplife that he and Langley were best friends off-screen.

=== Early relationships ===
Todd begins a relationship with Candice Stowe (Nikki Sanderson), before romancing Sarah Platt (Tina O'Brien). She later ends their relationship because she wants to date Aidan "Ade" Critchley (Dean Ashton). Langley and O'Brien were in a relationship and she told Frances Traynor from the Daily Record that acting out their break-up was not strange. Todd then resumes his previous relationship with Candice. However, Todd soon returns to Sarah. She decides to sleep with Todd on her sixteenth birthday; storyline was controversial, and nine viewers contacted the Independent Television Commission. The organisation investigated the scenes and cleared Coronation Street of breaching guidelines. They praised them for building a relationship between the two characters and viewed it as a mature decision. Prior to this, Langley's friends would tease him because Todd was a virgin. O'Brien told Steve Hendry from the Sunday Mail that Sarah is "a bit dependent on Todd". In June 2003, Alex Tate from The People reported that Sarah-Louise would dump Todd. Sarah fears that she and Bethany are preventing Todd from succeeding at Oxford University. However, Sarah and Todd move into a flat together. Sarah's daughter Bethany Platt (Amy and Emily Walton) electrocutes herself, and Todd finds her unconscious; this accident prompts Gail Platt (Helen Worth) to involve social services.

=== Sexuality ===
In March 2003, Polly Graham from the Sunday Mirror reported that executive producer Kieran Roberts wanted Todd to become the show's first gay character. The show confirmed that had discussed the possibility but nothing has been decided upon. On 22 August 2003, it was reported that Todd would befriend Sarah's brother, Nick Tilsley (Adam Rickett) and kiss him. However, Nick does not reciprocate. A show spokesperson said that the storyline was a "groundbreaking move" and predicted a varied and "huge reaction" from viewers. They told a reporter from the Liverpool Echo that Todd had always questioned his sexuality. They added that "the storyline came naturally out of the character. It is being handled extremely sensitively." In October a spokesperson commented that "this is just the start. It's not a case of having a gay kiss just for titillation's sake. Todd will continue to struggle with his feelings, not for Nick, but general confusion over his sexuality." Approximately fourteen million viewers watched the kiss and sixteen complaints were filed.

Todd kissed Karl Foster (Chris Finch) and began an affair. The decision was made to film the scenes in the centre of Manchester's Gay Village, Canal Street. As the kiss was filmed, revellers on the street cheered at the actors. Langley was worried about portraying the issue led story correctly. He told Billy Sloan of the Sunday Mail that the crowd approval made him believe he was doing it right. Filming inside the street's nightclubs was carried out while actual drinkers were having their nights out. Thirty extras were hired to make the clubs look busier. Langley thought the location shoot was advantageous because "it gave you a real feeling of the atmosphere. It was very different from being on the normal Corrie set." A spokesperson added that it was the beginning of Todd's realisation about his sexuality. While kissing Karl, Todd sees Sarah approaching, and is "mortified", but she fails to notice Todd and Karl's kiss.

The storyline sparks a fight between Eileen and Gail. Eileen attacks Gail after she brands Todd a "two-timing, twisted, lying pervert". The two proceed to pull each other's hair out in the street.

=== Departure (2004) ===
In May 2004, it was announced that Langley had decided to leave Coronation Street. He stated that he had spent happy years with the show, but felt it was the correct time to leave. The producers did not expect Langley to leave, and had planned his sexuality storyline for two years in advance. They were shocked by the actor's decision to leave, and had to revise the storyline to facilitate Langley's impending departure. They decided not to kill Todd, making it possible for Langley to reprise the role. Todd decides to leave Weatherfield when he discovers Jason and Sarah in bed together. The show's producer Tony Wood added that Langley "has been an asset to the show and his portrayal of the sexually confused Todd has been superb." Daran Little, who wrote Todd's coming out storyline, told Daniel Martin and Jason Deans from The Guardian that he wanted to create a spin-off show focusing on Todd living in London. Langley was asked to return at various points, but could not do so due to other work commitments.

=== Returns ===
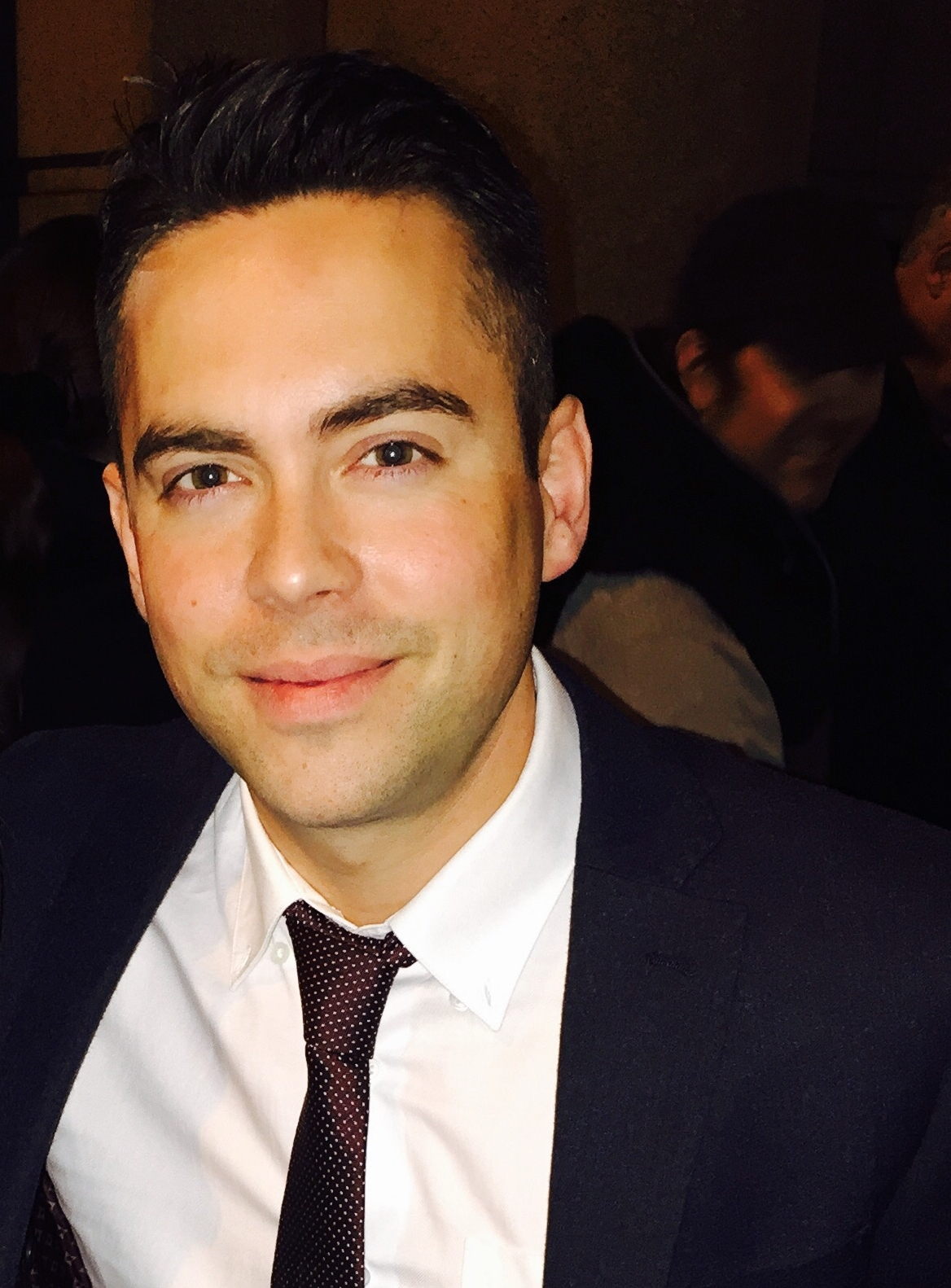
Langley reprised his role as Todd for two short stints in 2007 and 2011

In 2007, Langley returned to the show to film fifteen episodes as Todd. Langley said that he would return again because he enjoyed filming scenes with the Grimshaw family. In 2009, Thomas asked the new producer Kim Crowther if she would reintroduce the character.

On 30 January 2011, Daniel Kilkelly from Digital Spy revealed that Todd would return to Coronation Street. A spokesperson told Kilkelly that "we are currently in negotiations with Bruno Langley about a short storyline." Langley was on a theatre tour when asked to return. He split his time between Leeds and Manchester to film Todd's reappearance, which was for a single episode broadcast on 24 April 2011. Despite the return, Langley filmed over five days and decided to convey that Todd had changed. However, he noted that Todd "is essentially the same guy – he's just grown up." Todd returns to visit Eileen, and introduces her to his new boyfriend, Jools Creme (Ben Allen). Langley told Kilkelly that Todd and Jools must be in a serious relationship because Todd has never introduced a boyfriend to his family. Jools is middle-class and Todd had been treated as a guest at posh parties. Langley explained that Todd is nervous because residents of Weatherfield are completely different from Jools. It was also revealed that Gail would not welcome Todd's return and brands him a "gay gold-digger".

=== Reintroduction ===
On 17 August 2012, Langley revealed that he would like to return to the show. On 5 June 2013, it was announced that the character would be returning to Coronation Street, with Langley returning as a regular cast member. Executive producer Stuart Blackburn told an itv.com reporter that "Todd is a much loved character who has real history on the show and his return will leave Eileen with some impossible choices." Langley said it was a great time to reprise the role and explore how Todd has changed whilst living in London. He added that he was happy to see the Grimshaw family reunited. Langley returned to filming on 27 August and his first scenes aired on 4 November 2013. Nick Owens from the Daily Mirror reported that Todd's return would see him attempt to ruin Marcus Dent (Charlie Condou) and Maria Connor's (Samia Ghadie) relationship.

Upon his return Todd is played as a manipulative liar. Langley told Mark James Lowe from All About Soap that Todd had a job and a boyfriend in London but soon lost everything. Todd behaved badly and "burnt his bridges" with those he knew. When Todd arrives back he is untruthful with his family. His ex-boyfriend Alex Hughes (Nathan Ives-Moiba) arrives claiming that Todd has stolen his money. Langley explained that Todd does not like being exposed as a liar because he enjoys Eileen viewing him as the "better son". The actor told David Brown from Radio Times that Todd is concerned about the way Eileen views him, but does not care what other residents think. Todd has no worries about seeing Nick (now played by Ben Price) and Gail again, but upon doing so he is confronted with his past. The change of behavior continues as Todd manipulates Sean Tully (Antony Cotton) into convincing Eileen to ask him to stay. Langley explained that Todd "knows that Sean fancies him so he uses that against him. He manipulates Sean into speaking to Eileen and his plan works. Eileen wants him to stay, which makes Todd very pleased with himself."

Langley also confirmed reports that Todd would attempt to steal Marcus away from Maria. He added that Todd would manipulate and use Sean in his efforts to impress and attract Marcus. However, Maria is unaware of Todd's intentions towards her partner. Of Todd's motives, Langley said that "he likes a challenge and I guess he's probably one of those people who likes the drama of splitting couples up. It's all for his own ego and just to prove that he can." The actor was happy with Todd's changed personality. He noted that Todd spent years living away from home and it would have been a bad decision for him to return exactly the same person. Todd's manipulation of Sean is soon exposed by Brian Packham (Peter Gunn). Todd reveals that he could never be attracted to Sean and Brian informs him. To gain revenge, Todd exposes secrets to his girlfriend Julie Carp (Katy Cavanagh). Langley told a reporter from New! that "[Todd] was really angry so [he] decided to wreck his relationship with Julie."

=== Affair with Marcus Dent ===
In January 2014, the storyline between Todd and Marcus (played by Charlie Condou) was developed. Marcus is a gay male in a relationship with a female, who has not acted on his attraction to men while with Maria. However, Todd has a birthday party, which Marcus attends, and Todd uses the opportunity to gain his attention. Todd manipulates the situation by taking his shirt off in-front of Marcus. Condou told David Brown from Radio Times that Todd is "very flirtatious" and his handsome looks do not go unnoticed by Marcus. He was "turned on" by Todd but also upset about it. Todd takes his plan further by getting Marcus alone to kiss him. Eileen interrupts them and Todd admits that he tried instigate a kiss. Condou added that Todd controls the situation and knows exactly what to say to his advantage. This leaves Marcus "conflicted" because he loves Maria and Todd is "bad for him", but he cannot keep away. Condou told Allison Jones from Inside Soap that "He's trying to tell himself his feelings for Todd aren't a big thing, but Todd's like a dog with a bone and when he wants something he won't let go. He knows what he wants and he's going to get it." Langley explained that Todd made an effort to behave cunningly, choosing to loiter around Coronation Street to keep an eye on Marcus. Todd does not care about the consequences and has his sights set firmly on Marcus. Langley explained that his character does not consider Maria's feelings because he has a "warped" view that he is doing Marcus and Maria a favour: he believes that Marcus will eventually decide to be with another man and believes it should be himself. Todd also claims to be in love and lets local gossip Sean know, playing a game of manipulation, knowing Marcus will hear of it. Langley further explained Todd's motives: "I think Todd has a reason for doing what he's doing. Todd was going to marry Sarah and have children, but he knew it wasn't right [...] he can see the same pattern happening with Marcus, so Todd is quite adamant when he tells Marcus that he's doing the wrong thing."

=== Departure (2017) ===
In October 2017, a woman complained to ITV that Langley had acted inappropriately towards, and sexually assaulted her, in a Manchester bar. After an internal investigation into the sexual assault allegation made by the woman, Langley's contract with Coronation Street was terminated with immediate effect. His last on-screen appearance was on 22 December 2017. On 30 October 2017, police confirmed that Langley had been charged with two counts of sexual assault, to which he pleaded guilty on 28 November 2017.

=== Recast ===
On 12 July 2020, it was announced that Coronation Street producers were beginning to look at a new actor to portray Todd. Todd returned on 9 October 2020 played by Gareth Pierce.

== Storylines ==
=== 2001–2017 ===
Highly academic, Todd is poised to sit A-Levels until he gets involved with teenage mother, Sarah Platt (Tina O'Brien), with whom he falls in love, leaving thoughts of university behind in favour of domesticity; much to his mother's dismay. Sarah becomes pregnant with Todd's baby, her second, at the age of sixteen. However, changes begin to show in Todd when he becomes infatuated with Sarah's older brother, Nick Tilsley (Adam Rickett). After a night out, Todd kisses a sleeping Nick, who wakes up and rebuffs him. Although Nick remains convinced that Todd is gay and insists that Sarah finish her relationship with him, Todd is able to pass the incident off as a misguided moment of drunken confusion. Despite this, he later secretly embarks on a relationship with gay nurse Karl Foster. They sleep together in Sarah's bed, and Todd admits that he enjoys sneaking around behind Sarah's back. Karl ends their relationship when Todd refuses to break up with Sarah, wanting to have Sarah and his child at home and Karl as his "bit on the side". Todd then comes out as gay to Sarah.

Sarah then suffers a placental abruption, caused by a pre-existing medical condition, and goes into premature labour. She has an emergency caesarean section and their son Billy is born, leaving them both on the critical list. Todd shows little concern for Sarah's wellbeing during this time, and is only interested in Billy, demanding that Sarah take him to see him. Billy dies 24 hours after his birth, and tensions escalate between the Platts and Grimshaws. Todd comes to terms with his sexuality, resumes his studies and is accepted to study at Oxford University.

However, when Todd catches Sarah and his brother Jason together, he lashes out at Sarah, slapping her and throwing her out, then fighting with Jason. In the aftermath, Todd moves to London and tells Sarah he hopes she finds someone who loves her as much as he did.

Todd returns three years later for Jason's stag party. He tells Eileen he is in an open relationship with a man named Ben and has obtained his law degree and is doing temporary work. Jason informs Todd that Sarah's younger brother David Platt (Jack P. Shepherd) sent Todd's invitation after forging Jason's handwriting. Todd is hurt, as he thinks he has finally been accepted by Jason again, and is mortified about being tricked into returning. Before he can depart, Todd and Sarah cross paths when she arrives at the house, and they argue. However, Jason convinces Sarah that Todd should stay, otherwise David will have won. After Sarah throws a tantrum following Jason and Todd's drunken behaviour at the stag do, Todd confronts her and tells her to stop being selfish. They argue, but work things out and promise to lay the past to rest. Todd attends the wedding and returns to London soon after. Todd later visits the street with his new wealthy boyfriend Jools, and introduces him to Eileen. Eileen and Todd argue because he is ashamed of his working-class background. He leaves after making his apologies.

Todd loses his job as a lawyer and returns to Weatherfield, but fails to inform Eileen. A man named Alex then arrives and reveals Todd has stolen his money, cheated on Jools and is unemployed. Eileen is upset with Todd's lies, but he manipulates Sean into helping reaffirm his place in the Grimshaw household. Todd enjoys causing trouble for Brian who has been keeping secrets from Julie. This annoys Marcus, but Todd manipulates the situation and gains his trust. Todd tries to cause tension with Marcus and Maria, later attempts to kiss him, but Eileen interrupts. Todd refuses to listen to her warnings revealing that he sees sleeping with Marcus as a challenge. He begins to disrupt Marcus and Maria's relationship and spends more time with them. Todd spreads a rumour that he is in love and Marcus becomes jealous. They sleep together, but Marcus warns Todd off, so Todd continues to manipulate him. He sets up a scenario in which Maria will catch them being intimate. Maria throws Marcus out, leaving Todd free to pursue Marcus for himself. Todd later starts a relationship with vicar Billy Mayhew (Daniel Brocklebank) and they foster a child, Summer Spellman (Matilda Freeman), the daughter of Billy's ex-boyfriend who died. Todd left Weatherfield in December 2017 with Summer (fearing her grandmother would gain custody) and went on the run after assaulting a police officer, telling Summer to go find Billy.

=== 2020–present ===
In 2020, Sean, Billy and Mary Taylor (Patti Clare) read a letter meant for Eileen (who is currently visiting Jason in Spain) supposedly from Todd, asking for £1,000. They agree to go ahead with his plan, but they discover that it is a young woman called Safia (Sofiya Limalia) who admits that she wrote the letter and that she is scamming them. This leads Billy and Sean to contact the police, where they told he was found and released, meaning he is no longer on the run. While he was on the run, he worked for criminals, offering legal advice, and continued to work for them after. After Eileen returns from visiting Jason in Spain, Todd gets in contact, leaving a note in Eileen's house, telling her to meet her at a warehouse. The meeting is interrupted when they are cornered by gangster Mick Chaney (Neil Bell), who demands that Todd come with him. Todd hits him over the head, and he and Eileen run. When Eileen is called in to identify a dead body, Todd begs her to say that it him. At first she agrees, but she does not go through with it. Todd confronts Eileen and tells her that he owes Mick £1,000, and when Mick follows Eileen home, he reveals that he is Todd's ex. Mick discovers that Todd is in the house, and takes out a gun, threatening to shoot Eileen unless he follows, which he does; however, when they leave, Gary Windass (Mikey North) hits Mick over the head with a baseball bat in the garden.

== Reception ==
In 2017, Langley and Brocklebank were longlisted for Best Partnership at the Inside Soap Awards. They did not progress to the viewer-voted shortlist. Pierce was longlisted for "Best Actor" at the 2026 Inside Soap Awards, whilst "Todd's abuse at the hands of Theo" was longlisted for "Best Storyline".

In 2003, a survey was conducted amongst British landlords to determine which fictional characters most resembled real life tenants. 35% of landlords chose Todd and Sarah, who represented teenagers struggling to pay rent. A reporter from Hello! magazine has branded Todd a "unlucky-in-love, relationship-challenged" character whose life is blighted with problems. A writer from Orange branded him the "beacon of benevolence", and a reporter from the Daily Record opined that Todd kissing Nick sent "Coronation Street crashing into the 21st century". They added that they were surprised that it took forty-three years to feature a same sex kiss.

Rachael Tinniswood of the Liverpool Echo was not impressed with the "unrealistic" storyline. She said that "poor Todd" had "homosexuality foisted upon" him in a "sad attempt" to gain viewers. Brian Roberts from the Daily Mirror believed that Todd was "out of the closet once and for all" when he kissed Karl in Canal Street. He branded the show's first gay kiss as a mere peck in comparison to the second. Inside Soap ran an opinion poll asking readers whether or not they felt Todd's gay storyline was overdue or too taboo for television. 63 per cent voted that it was about time the show covered the topic.

In 2014, an Inside Soap writer branded him a "wily man-hunter". A fellow writer named him a "manipulative fella" and "scheming man-stealer". Jane Simon of the Daily Mirror questioned whether Todd was attempting to become the show's "new devil child". She observed his behavior to be that of a "boy poking a wasp's nest with a big stick." A writer from TV Magazine said that Todd would stop at nothing to get Marcus, top rated his cunning behaviour and branded him a "rotter".
