= Tupele Dorgu =

British actress

- Born: 13 December 1977 (age 48); Preston, Lancashire, England
- Occupations: Actress, voice over artist
- Years active: 2003–present
- Notable work: Kelly Crabtree in Coronation Street & Dr Berrington in Hollyoaks
- Television: Coronation Street (2004–2010); Strictly African Dancing (2005); Soapstar Superstar (2007); Hollyoaks (2015–2016)
- Spouse: Mark Flanagan (married 2009)

Jacqueline Tupele Dorgu (born 13 December 1977) is a British actress and voice over artist. She is known for playing the role of Kelly Crabtree in the ITV soap opera Coronation Street from 2004 to 2010.

== Early life ==
Dorgu was educated in and around the Preston area; she attended St Clare's Primary School, Our Lady's High School and latterly at Kirkham Grammar School. Her mother is of Irish and English descent and her father is from Nigeria.

== Career ==
Dorgu has also appeared in Merseybeat, Loose Women, Casualty (2004), Doctors and Strictly African Dancing.

Dorgu has performed in many musicals including La Cage Aux Folles, Three Minute Heroes, and the West End production of Mamma Mia!. In January 2007, Dorgu was a contestant on UK reality series Soapstar Superstar. The show, hosted by Zoë Ball, placed Dorgu up against ten other soap opera actors. Each night, they had to sing a different song with only 24 hours to learn it. Dorgu survived the bottom two for five nights and then went out after making it to the semi-finals.

Dorgu left her role as Kelly Crabtree in Coronation Street in March 2010.

In winter 2010, Dorgu starred as the Sorceress in the pantomime Robin Hood at the Theatre Royal in Newcastle from 30 November until 15 January 2011. In mid-2011, she made a brief appearance on the BBC's Waterloo Road as newcomer Keeley James.

Dorgu starred as Velma Kelly in the 2012 UK tour of Chicago.

In June 2013, Dorgu became the narrator of Brendan's Magical Mystery Tour, a show similar to Coach Trip on Channel 4.

Dorgu was announced to be joining the cast of Hollyoaks on 12 December 2015 as new doctor, Dr Berrington, in a recurring capacity. Dorgu's first appearance aired on 30 December.

On 1 January 2016, she appeared in David Walliams' TV adaptation of Billionaire Boy. In November 2024, she appeared in the final episode of the BBC soap opera Doctors as Bev Dartnall.

== Filmography ==
Year	Title	Role	Notes
2003	Doctors	Annette Poole	1 Episode, Episode Titled: "Nothing to Fear but..."
2003, 2004	Merseybeat	Natalie Vance	3 Episodes, "Warrior Moon", "Repeat Offender" and "Day of Reckoning"
2004	Casualty	Rachel Garrard	1 Episode, Episode Titled "Breaking Point"
2004–2010	Coronation Street	Kelly Crabtree	Series Regular, 511 Episodes
2005	Strictly African Dancing	Herself	Contestant
2006, 2009, 2010	Loose Women	Herself	Guest, 3 Episodes
2007	Soapstar Superstar	Herself	Contestant
2007, 2008	This Morning	Herself	Guest, 6 Episodes
2010	Accused	Functions Manager	Episode Titled: "Willy's Story"
2010, 2012, 2014	The Wright Stuff	Herself	Panelist, 8 Episodes
2010	Come Dine with Me	Herself	Coronation Street Special
2011	Total Wipeout	Herself	Celebrity Special 2
2011	Waterloo Road	Keely James	1 Episode
2011	The Case	Nicole Jones	4 Episodes
2013	Brendan's Magical Mystery Tour	Herself/narrator	Day Time TV Series
2014	M.I. High	Mandy Pluckley	1 Episode, Episode Titled: "The Problem Probe"
2014	Trying Again	Chloe	1 Episode
2014	All at Sea	Molly Tipton	1 Episode, Episode Titled: "Valentine"
2015	Cucumber	Rosemary Pinks	1 Episode
2015−2016	Hollyoaks	Dr Berrington	Recurring role
2016	Billionaire Boy	Julie	Television special
2016	Sugar Free Farm	Herself	Documentary series
2016	The Coroner	Lori Fletcher	Episode 2.1 "The Drop Zone"
2017	Casualty	Monica Blears	Series 31 Episode 25 "It Starts with the Shoes"
2020	Andy And The Band	Ivy	Series 1 Episode 5 "Hair-Raising Rescue"
2020	Alma's Not Normal	Cheryl	2 Episodes
2024–present	Strike	Midge	Series 6; 4 episodes
2024	Bad Tidings	Sabrina	Television film
2024	Doctors	Bev Dartnall	Episode: "One Day Like This"

== Radio ==
Year	Title	Role	Notes
2014	Hatch, Match and Dispatch	Duchess	BBC Radio 4, Episode Two: "Losing My Penny"

== Theatre ==
Title	Role	Theatre
La Cage Aux Folles	Dermah	English Theatre, Frankfurt
Three Minute Heroes	Sonia	Belgrade Theatre
Mamma Mia	Ali	Prince Edward Theatre
Hillbrow	Johanna	Courtyard Theatre
Robin Hood	Sorceress	Theatre Royal
Chicago	Velma Kelly	UK Tour Production, Number One Tour
Educating Rita	Rita	The Garrick, Lichfield
Teechers	Hobby	Theatre Royal Wakefield and Tour
Snow White and the Seven Dwarfs (Pantomime)	Wicked Queen	Floral Pavilion, New Brighton
Noises Off	Belinda Bleir	Royal Court Liverpool
Legally Blonde	Paulette	Leicester Curve
