= Jane Danson =

English actress (born 1978)

- Born: Jane Elizabeth Dawson; 8 November 1978 (age 47); Bury, Greater Manchester, England
- Other name: Jane Dawson
- Years active: 1991–present
- Notable work: Children's Ward (1995–1997); Coronation Street (1997–2000, 2004–); Always and Everyone (2001–2002); The Bill (2002–2003)
- Spouse: Robert Beck (m. 2005)
- Children: 2

Jane Danson (born Jane Elizabeth Dawson, 8 November 1978) is an English actress. She is known for her portrayal of Leanne Battersby in the ITV soap opera Coronation Street, between 1997 and 2000, and from 2004 onwards. Her other television credits include Children's Ward (1995–1997), The Grand (1997) and The Bill (2002–2003). For her role on Coronation Street, Danson won the 2011 British Soap Award for Best Dramatic Performance.

== Career ==
At the age of 12, Danson made her television debut under the name Jane Dawson in the 1991 Alan Bleasdale series GBH playing the part of Eileen Critchley. From 1995 to 1997, Danson played the role of Paula in the ITV children's television drama Children's Ward. In 1996, she also appeared in Out of Tune, a British children's sitcom which was shown on CBBC. She also made an appearance in the first episode of the BBC's Hetty Wainthropp Investigates which was aired in January 1996.

In 1997, Danson landed parts in the ITV period drama series The Grand, in which she played the role of Monica Jones for seven episodes, and then in the top-rated ITV soap opera Coronation Street, playing teenager Leanne Battersby. The Battersby family were dubbed the "Neighbours From Hell" and made an immediate impact on the long-running show's loyal audience. Danson left the show in 2000, not long after a harrowing storyline that saw her character become a drug addict. Danson's next role was as Nurse Samantha Docherty in the drama series Always and Everyone (also known as A&E) from 2001 to 2002. Danson then joined the cast of ITV police drama The Bill in 2002, portraying Gemma Osbourne, the first lesbian police officer in the show's history, who openly described herself as a "gold star lesbian" and "a 6 on the Kinsey Scale". Danson's stint in the role of Gemma Osbourne was short-lived, and she left The Bill in 2003.

In 2004, Danson rejoined the cast of Coronation Street as Leanne. In early 2006, it was announced that Danson was pregnant and she left Coronation Street at the end of July for maternity leave. She returned to filming in January 2007, making her first appearance back on screen two months later. In January 2007, Danson appeared in the second series of Soapstar Superstar but was eliminated after the overnight vote on the second show. However, a subsequent investigation into malpractice on the part of ITV in viewer voting revealed that while Danson and Tupele Dorgu were both put forward for elimination at the end of the first episode, it had in fact been Verity Rushworth and Leon Lopez who scored lowest in the poll and should therefore have been the two options.

=== Television appearances ===
Danson appeared on the first celebrity edition of Stars in Their Eyes. Alongside four other actresses from Coronation Street, they impersonated the Spice Girls.

In 2019, Danson took part in the eleventh series of Dancing on Ice alongside professional partner Sylvain Longchambon. Following a skate-off against Melody Thornton and Ryan Sidebottom, Danson and Sidebottom were eliminated in Week 7.

== Personal life ==
Danson attended Radcliffe High School, Radcliffe near Bury in Greater Manchester. She began dating former Brookside actor Robert Beck in 1999 and the two married in December 2005. The couple met at the 1999 British Soap Awards. Danson said that she had a crush on Beck since she was 15. On their marriage, Danson said in 2018, "Rob's absolutely my best friend in the world. We've only had about two rows in twenty years." The couple have two sons together: Harry (born July 2006) and Sam (born February 2009). In December 2018, Danson revealed that she had miscarried a third child, which she and Beck discovered at their three-month scan.

== Awards and nominations ==
Year	Award	Category	Result	Ref.
1998	National TV Awards	Most Popular Newcomer	Nominated	
2005	TV Quick & TV Choice Awards	Best Soap Actress	Nominated	
2005	National TV Awards	Most Popular Actress	Nominated	
2006	National TV Awards	Most Popular Actress	Nominated	
2010	TV Now Awards	Favourite Female Soap Star	Nominated	
2011	National TV Awards	Serial Drama Performance	Longlisted	
2011	All About Soap Bubble Awards	Best Love Triangle (with Chris Gascoyne and Ben Price)	Nominated	
2011	British Soap Awards	Best Actress	Longlisted	
2011	British Soap Awards	Best Dramatic Performance	Won	
2011	Inside Soap Awards	Best Actress	Longlisted	
2011	Inside Soap Awards	Best Dramatic Performance	Shortlisted	
2011	RTS North West Awards	Best Performance in a Continuing Drama	Won	
2011	TV Times Awards	Favourite Soap Star	Nominated	
2012	National TV Awards	Serial Drama Performance	Longlisted	
2012	British Soap Awards	Best Actress	Longlisted	
2012	Inside Soap Awards	Best Actress	Longlisted	
2012	All About Soap Awards	Best Love Triangle (with Chris Gascoyne and Ben Price)	Nominated	
2012	TV Times Awards	Favourite Soap Star	Nominated	
2013	National TV Awards	Serial Drama Performance	Longlisted	
2013	All About Soap Awards	Best Wedding (shared with Ben Price)	Nominated	
2015	TV Choice Awards	Best Soap Actress	Nominated	
2015	Inside Soap Awards	Best Actress	Longlisted	
2016	Inside Soap Awards	Best Actress	Longlisted	
2016	RTS North West Awards	Best Performance in a Continuing Drama	Nominated	
2017	National TV Awards	Serial Drama Performance	Longlisted	
2017	British Soap Awards	Best Actress	Longlisted	
2020	Inside Soap Awards	Best Actress	Longlisted	
2020	Digital Spy Reader Awards	Best Actor (Female)	Third	
2020	I Talk Telly Awards	Best Soap Performance	Won	
2021	TRIC Awards	TV Soap Personality	Nominated	
2021	National TV Awards	Serial Drama Performance	Longlisted	
2021	The Version Soap Awards	Best Actress	Won	
2021	Inside Soap Awards	Best Partnership (with Ben Price)	Nominated	
2021	I Talk Telly Awards	Best Soap Partnership (with Ben Price)	Won	
