= Rupert Hill =

English TV and theatre actor (b. 1978)

- Born: Rupert Sinclair Hill; 15 June 1978 (age 47); Southampton, Hampshire, England
- Occupation: Actor
- Years active: 2001–present
- Known for: Roles in several soap operas
- Spouse: Jenny Platt (m. 2013)
- Children: 1

Rupert Sinclair Hill (born 15 June 1978) is an English actor. He is known for his roles in several soap operas.

== Career ==
Hill began his television career with minor roles, including an appearance as Kevin Bolton in EastEnders and a featured role in a music video for the band Haven. From 2002 to 2004, he played series regular Cameron Davenport in the daily soap opera Family Affairs. He was subsequently cast in Coronation Street as Jamie Baldwin, a role he played from 2004 until his departure in 2008.

Following his time on Coronation Street, Hill appeared as small-time criminal Kieran Wallace in a 2008 four-part special of The Bill titled "Gun Runner". He returned to his role in Coronation Street in 2011 for one episode. In 2012, he starred alongside Dervla Kirwan and Charlotte Riley in the British horror film Entity. He transitioned to stage acting in September 2014, performing as Guy in a UK touring production of The Full Monty. In 2018, he returned to soap operas with a guest role as Josh Bradley in Hollyoaks.

=== Other ventures ===
Hill was a guitarist for the defunct band Shepherd's Pi, which he formed alongside his Family Affairs co-stars Sam Stockman and Angela Hazeldine. As of 2013, he also leads a musical group called Biederbeck. He also co-writes and performs with the comedy sketch group Screaming Mess.

=== Awards ===
At the British Soap Awards 2007, Hill was shortlisted for 'Sexiest Male', but lost to his Coronation Street co-star Rob James-Collier.

== Personal life ==
Hill is married to Jenny Platt, who played Violet Wilson, his on-screen Coronation Street love interest. Together they have one daughter, Matilda. The couple reside in Manchester, where Hill co-owns several pubs, including the Castle Hotel and Gulliver's, both situated on Oldham Street in the Northern Quarter, and the Eagle Inn in Salford.

== Filmography ==
=== Film ===
- Entity (2012) as Matt Hurst

=== Television ===
Year(s)	Show	Role	Notes
2001	Doctors	Sean Philips	Episode: "Educating Teacher"
2001	Holby City	Ewan Jackson	Episode: "Ghosts"
2001	EastEnders	Kevin Bolton	1 episode
2001	Urban Gothic	Noah	Episode: "Serotonin Wild"
2002–2004	Family Affairs	Cameron Davenport	Series regular
2004–2008, 2011	Coronation Street	Jamie Baldwin	Series regular
2008	The Bill	Kieran Wallace	4 episodes: "Gun Runner: Fire Fight" "Gun Runner: Spray and Pray" "Gun Runner: Kick Off" "Gun Runner: Under Cover"
2012	Doctors	Tony Marsden	Episode: "Divine Intervention"
2012	Midsomer Murders	Kyle Gideon	Episode: "Murder of Innocence"
2012	Crime Stories	Glenn Lawson	1 episode
2018	Hollyoaks	Josh Bradley	9 episodes
2019	Casualty	Daryl Palmerston	1 episode
2022	Four Lives	Barking Police Officer 4	Episode #1.3
2024	Whitstable Pearl	Ian Carnage	Episode: "Walking with Ghosts"
