= List of Coronation Street producers =

This is a list of producers who have presided over the running of the ITV soap opera Coronation Street at some point since it began on 9 December 1960. In the early days, producers came and went on a regular basis, some repeating several short stints over a number of years. In recent years, however, with the established structure of the show and storylining more advanced than ever, producers are more likely to stay for longer periods. The dates are the day that their first and last episodes aired.

== Executive producers ==
No.	Executive Producer	Tenure
1	H. V. Kershaw	1965; 1968; 1969 – 1970; 1970 – 1971; 1971; 1972
2	Richard Everitt	1968
3	Bill Podmore	1982 – 1987
4	David Liddiment	1988 – 1992
5	Carolyn Reynolds	1993 – 1997; 1998 – 2000; 2002 – 2005
6	Jane Macnaught	2000 – 2002
7	Kieran Roberts	2006 – 2018
8	Iain MacLeod	2024 – 2025

== Creative Directors ==
No.	Creative Director	Tenure
1	Iain MacLeod	2025 – present

== Producers ==
No.	Producer	Dates
1	Stuart Latham	9 December 1960 – 10 July 1961; 17 February – 4 March 1964
2	Derek Granger	12 July 1961 – 16 April 1962
3	H.V. Kershaw	18 April 1962 – 8 May 1963; 28 September 1964 – 13 January 1965; 15 February – 28 April 1965; 11 July 1966 – 31 May 1967
4	Margaret Morris	13 May 1963 – 12 February 1964; 9 March – 11 May 1964
5	Tim Aspinall	13 May – 23 September 1964
6	Richard Everitt	18 January – 10 February 1965
7	Howard Baker	3 May 1965 – 21 July 1965; 6 September 1965 – 5 January 1966
8	Peter Eckersley	10 January – 6 July 1966
9	Jack Rosenthal	5 June – 22 November 1967
10	Michael Cox	27 November 1967 – 13 March 1968
11	Richard Doubleday	3 June – 30 October 1968
12	John Finch	4 November 1968 – 5 March 1969
13	June Howson	23 March – 19 October 1970; 12–14 September 1977
14	Leslie Duxbury	18 January – 10 March 1971; 12–28 August 1974; 8–29 September 1975; 3–12 October 1977
15	Brian Armstrong	22 November 1971 – 17 May 1972
16	Eric Prytherch	22 May 1972 – 24 April 1974; 23–25 June 1975
17	Susi Hush	15 April 1974 – 7 August 1974; 2 September 1974 – 18 June 1975; 30 June – 3 September 1975; 1 October 1975 – 4 February 1976; 29–31 March 1976
18	Bill Podmore	9 February 1976 – 24 March 1976; 5 April 1976 – 7 September 1977; 19–28 September 1977; 17 October 1977 – 29 December 1982; 31 August 1987 – 1 February 1989
19	Pauline Shaw	28 June – 1 December 1982
20	Mervyn Watson	6 December 1982 – 27 February 1985; 6 February 1989 – 24 January 1992
21	John G. Temple	4 March 1985 – 26 August 1987
22	Carolyn Reynolds	27 January 1992 – 7 January 1994
23	Tony Wood	10–21 January 1994; 29 March 2004 – 12 February 2006
24	Sue Pritchard	24 January 1994 – 14 March 1997
25	Brian Park	16 March 1997 – 4 December 1998
26	David Hanson	6 December 1998 – 22 October 1999
27	Jane MacNaught	24 October 1999 – 22 October 2000
28	Kieran Roberts	11 March 2002 – 28 March 2004
29	Steve Frost	13 February 2006 – 11 July 2008
30	Kim Crowther	14 July 2008 – 23 July 2010
31	Phil Collinson	26 July 2010 – 5 April 2013
32	Stuart Blackburn	8 April 2013 – 12 August 2016
33	Kate Oates	15 August 2016 – 10 December 2018
34	Iain MacLeod	12 December 2018 – 10 June 2024
35	Verity MacLeod	12 June 2024 – 13 December 2024
36	Kate Brooks	15 November 2024 – present
