= List of Coronation Street characters introduced in 2009 =

The following is a list of characters that first appeared in the ITV soap opera Coronation Street in 2009, in order of first appearance.

== Martha Fraser ==
Martha Fraser
- Coronation Street character
- Portrayed by: Stephanie Beacham
- Duration: 2009, 2022
- First appearance: 26 January 2009
- Last appearance: 14 December 2022
In-universe information
- Occupation: Actress
- Husband: Gordon Fraser (until 2002)

Martha Fraser, portrayed by Stephanie Beacham, made her first appearance on 26 January 2009. Beacham described her character as living a very solitary and lonely life. A set was built specially for Beacham's scenes, which meant, to her regret, she didn't get to appear in the Rovers.

Ken Barlow (William Roache) is walking his dog, Eccles, near the canal when the dog chases after some ducks and falls into the freezing water. As Ken tries to get Eccles out, Martha extends a fishing net from her boat and manages to save her. Martha offers Ken and Eccles a place to warm up, and Ken gratefully accepts.

Martha and Ken bond quickly over their shared love for literature. She tells him she has been living on a boat for seven years, ever since she split from her philandering husband. Ken confides in her about his troubled son, Peter Barlow (Chris Gascoyne). When Martha asks about Valerie Barlow (Anne Reid), Peter's mother, Ken tells her she is dead. Martha assumes that Ken is a widower, and Ken keeps quiet about his marriage to Deirdre (Anne Kirkbride). Ken visits her again several days later, and learns that she is now starring in a local production of A Streetcar Named Desire.

In March 2009, Martha and Ken finally kiss. Ken tells Martha that he is married on 2 April 2009. She is devastated and tells him to leave. However, he keeps pestering her to admit that she has feelings for him as he tells her that he is in love with her. Despite this, she isn't interested, especially when she discovers that Deirdre didn't know about their affair. Their relationship is discovered by Audrey Roberts (Sue Nicholls), after her ex-partner Ted Page (Michael Byrne), who had known about the affair, is forced to admit it. Audrey tells Ken's son Peter.

On 1 May 2009, Ken visits Martha again, where she tells him that she loves him too and they sleep together. As Ken is leaving, she tells him that she will soon be moving as she is working on a new play, and asks him to go with her. On 4 May, Martha is delighted when Ken arrives with a suitcase, saying that he is ready to join her. As she sails away, she looks back and sees Ken standing on the bridge; having changed his mind at the last minute.

Thirteen years later Martha returns to Weatherfield as part of a drama group, and ends up reuniting with Ken. Things are awkward between them, especially as Ken downplays the situation of what happened when they last met.

== Ben Richardson ==
Ben Richardson
- Coronation Street character
- Portrayed by: Lucien Laviscount
- First appearance: 2 February 2009
- Last appearance: 21 December 2009
In-universe information
- Occupation: Student
- Father: Mr. Richardson
- Mother: Carly Richardson
- Sisters: Mary Ellen Richardson
- Grandmothers: Tina Lotter

Ben Richardson, played by Lucien Laviscount, first appeared on 2 February 2009. Ben was added to the cast of Coronation Street with Sian (Sacha Parkinson), they were friends of Sophie Webster (Brooke Vincent), and formed a new group of teenagers with Ryan Connor (Ben Thompson).

Ben is the captain of his school's swimming team and embarks on a relationship with Sophie. He takes Sophie to the church youth theatre where she decides to become a Christian. In May 2009, he persuades Chesney Brown (Sam Aston) to return to school telling him he will stand up to Kenzie Judd and the other bullies if they hassle him again. On 10 July 2009, at Sally Webster's (Sally Dynevor) birthday party, Rosie (Helen Flanagan) winds Sophie up by flirting with Ben. Sophie flips and throws a drink over Rosie. However, her actions cause Sophie more problems when Ben tells Sophie he doesn't go out with drunk girls who fight, breaking up with Sophie but they eventually reconcile.

In November 2009, he stays with Ryan and Michelle Connor (Kym Marsh) for a while when his parents go to Southampton. On 18 December, Ben kisses Michelle. He is dismayed by his actions and moves out, thinking it is for the best. Ryan is disgusted by this and he refuses to speak to Ben. Sophie finds out on 21 December and initially refuses to believe it, accusing Ryan of being jealous and by then fighting back, saying that Michelle has slept with several other men. She then realises what has happened when she sees Ben and apologises to Ryan for the things she said. Ben and Sophie's relationship ends and he leaves the street.

== Paula Carp ==
Paula Carp
- Coronation Street character
- Portrayed by: Sharon Duce
- First appearance: 27 February 2009
- Last appearance: 22 May 2009
In-universe information
- Brothers: Richard Carp
- Daughters: Julie Carp

Paula Carp is the mother of established character Julie Carp (Katy Cavanagh). She first appears on 27 February 2009, having a drink with her daughter and meeting old friend Eileen Grimshaw (Sue Cleaver) for the first time in years. She surprises Eileen by revealing that she gave birth to Julie when she was only fifteen. Paula and Eileen meet several times at Eileen's house but Paula leaves quickly on one occasion when Colin (Edward de Souza), Eileen's father, enters as she feels awkward around him.

On 27 April 2009, at Colin's seventieth birthday party in the Rovers, Paula arrives, looking for Julie; thinking that Julie and Jason Grimshaw (Ryan Thomas) have slept together. Julie and Paula get into an argument over why they can't be together with Paula revealing that they are in fact, related and announces to a shocked Eileen and the rest of the pub that Colin is Julie's biological father. At first, Eileen blames Paula for wrecking her parents' marriage but then comes to realise that Paula, who was only 14 when she fell pregnant with Julie, was the victim. When Paula calls to see her a few days later, Eileen makes peace with her.

After Colin comes out of hospital, following a stroke, Paula goes to the police. When they come to the house he dies suddenly of a heart attack and Julie (who was getting to know and love her father) makes it clear she feels Paula is to blame and tells her to go away and never come back. In May 2013, Paula had broken her hip while ice skating, and Julie went to take care of her. Julie returned to Coronation Street in August, after her mother had made a recovery. In December 2013, Julie announced she rang her mother every Sunday and that she has a pet dog, that she often loses.

== Umed Alahan ==
Umed Alahan
- Coronation Street character
- Portrayed by: Harish Patel
- First appearance: 9 March 2009
- Last appearance: 16 October 2009
In-universe information
- Occupation: Shop assistant
- Brothers: Ranjiv Alahan
- Sons: Naveem Alahan
- Nephews: Dev Alahan; Unnamed
- Other relatives: Amber Kalirai (great); Shareen (great); Asha Alahan (great); Aadi Alahan (great)

Umed Alahan first appeared in March 2009 to visit his nephew Dev Alahan (Jimmi Harkishin). He soon became suspicious of Dev's girlfriend Tara Mandal (Ayesha Dharker), believing that she was taking advantage of Dev's money. Umed usually appeared in comical scenes, involving himself and his family.

In May 2009, Umed claimed that he knew and inspired the band Cornershop, giving them the incentive for the name as he has a history of running Indian corner stores. He also commented about the fact that their hit song, Brimful of Asha, was about Bollywood singer Asha Bhosle. Umed spent most of his time in the corner shop, which Dev owned; he also worked there. Umed usually spent his time chatting to his great niece Amber (Nikki Patel) or employee Molly Compton (Vicky Binns) while in the shop.

In October 2009, Umed installed a new bell at the corner shop, annoying and driving many residents to distraction. Graeme Proctor (Craig Gazey) managed to knock the bell off and break it while pretending to clean the windows.

Umed took pity on Teresa Bryant (Karen Henthorn) after Dev fired and evicted her, allowing her to make curry in Prima Doner, and managing to patch things up between her and Lloyd Mullaney (Craig Charles). When Dev found out about the curry business, Umed confessed to having lost his own business through a gambling addiction. He decided to return to India on 16 October 2009, giving Dev a hug goodbye.

== Rick Peach ==
Rick Peach
- Coronation Street character
- Portrayed by: Nick Caldecott
- Duration: 2009–2010
- First appearance: 12 April 2009
- Last appearance: 24 December 2010
In-universe information
- Occupation: Vicar

Rick Peach was a vicar who was involved in scenes with Sophie Webster (Brooke Vincent) and Blanche Hunt (Maggie Jones). During Easter Sunday, he allowed people to bring their animals to the church, and Simon Barlow (Alex Bain) brought his rabbit. Blanche wasn't happy however after she stood in dog excrement, and accused Rick of using the animals as an excuse to get people to come to the church, Rick found this funny. Sophie revealed that she would be baptised by Rick as he had brought Jesus into her life.

During a memorial service on Christmas Eve 2010 in respect to the victims of a recent Tram Crash in Coronation Street, Rick was conducting the service. However it was interrupted with the return of Tracy Barlow (Kate Ford) who was released from prison.

== Connie Rathbone ==
Connie Rathbone
- Coronation Street character
- Portrayed by: Rita May
- Duration: 2009–2010
- First appearance: 17 April 2009
- Last appearance: 20 December 2010
- Created by: Kim Crowther
In-universe information
- Occupation: Businesswoman (retired)
- Husband: Eric Rathbone (1960–2000)

Connie Rathbone was a close friend of Jack Duckworth (Bill Tarmey). She first appears on 17 April 2009, when she discovers one of Jack's missing pigeons and returns it to him. Connie and Jack get friendly as they chat about them both being widowed. As Connie's visits become more frequent, Tyrone (Alan Halsall) gets annoyed, seeing it as an insult to Jack's deceased wife Vera's (Liz Dawn) memory. In May, Connie invites Jack on holiday to Spain with her. Jack is afraid of what Tyrone will think of him and Connie going on holiday together, he lies and says he is going to Blackpool. In July, he visits Connie at her house and is amazed to discover that she is rich and lives in a lavish mansion. Tyrone is initially hostile towards Connie as he sees her as an insult to memories of Vera and believing she is after Jack's money, but realises this is not the case after seeing her big house. Jack moves in with Connie in September 2009 to give Tyrone and Molly more space.

In November 2009, Jack and Connie join Tyrone in the Rovers for a drink. After Connie leaves, Jack tells Tyrone he is worried that she wants more than companionship. Jack then hides out at Tyrone's until Connie catches up with him and reveals it is only a misunderstanding about her sleepwalking, much to Jack's relief.

Connie and Jack join Tyrone, Molly (Vicky Binns), Pam Hobsworth (Kate Anthony) and Bill Webster (Peter Armitage) for Christmas Day 2009.

Connie returns in November 2010 to attend Jack's 74th birthday party. After returning from his party at the Rovers, Connie, Tyrone and Molly discover that Jack has died in his sleep in his favourite armchair. Connie attends his funeral and goes to Blackpool with Tyrone and Molly to scatter his ashes.

After Molly's funeral and upon Tyrone discovering Molly's affair with Kevin Webster (Michael Le Vell), Connie tries to help and comfort him but his emotions get the better of him and a tearful Connie leaves the house. She has not been seen since. In December 2011, Tyrone received a Christmas card from Connie in which she says that he should visit her sometime. In December 2012, Tyrone lied to abusive fiancé Kirsty (Natalie Gumede) that he was going to visit Connie so that he could spend time with Fiz (Jennie McAlpine).

== Ramsay Clegg ==
Ramsay Clegg
- Coronation Street character
- Portrayed by: Andrew Sachs
- First appearance: 15 May 2009
- Last appearance: 27 August 2009
In-universe information
- Occupation: Retired
- Mother: Eunice Cole
- Half-brothers: Norris Cole

Ramsay Leonard Clegg is the long-lost half-brother of Norris Cole (Malcolm Hebden).

On 15 May 2009, Ramsay (Andrew Sachs) comes to The Kabin looking for a 'Mr Norris Cole', and as Rita asks if he wants to leave a message, he leaves without speaking. He later arrives at the Rovers and Norris asks him to leave. Emily and Rita are very surprised but Norris accuses Ramsay of murdering their mother, saying that he still "had blood on his hands". Later, it emerges that Ramsay is Norris' older illegitimate half-brother, who was sent to Australia as a child. Norris blames Ramsay for their mother's death, claiming that the stress of him reappearing caused her demise.

Ramsay returns to the Street, knowing that he doesn't have long to live, thanks to an inoperable brain tumour. He wants to make amends with Norris before he dies and Emily Bishop (Eileen Derbyshire) takes a shine to Ramsay, and the pair become close. He tries to make friends with Norris repeatedly but he remains hostile. Clutching at straws, Ramsay shows Norris around a vacant apartment in Victoria Court and suggests they live together. Norris rejects the idea and Ramsay returns to Australia on 27 August 2009, after sharing a tender moment with Emily. Norris refuses to forgive him and Ramsay leaves, disappointed, in the back of a taxi. Norris and Emily are shocked to hear that, on arrival in Australia, Ramsay was found dead on the plane. Ramsay leaves his estate to Norris, who initially tells Emily to take the trunk to her charity shop but she insists that Norris goes through it first. Inside the trunk, Norris finds a pile of letters that Ramsay had written to their mother, all returned unopened, and in Ramsay's wallet, a cold note from Eunice, asking him not to get in touch as she had another son and his appearance in their lives would ruin everything. Devastated, Norris wishes that he had been more receptive to Ramsay but accepts that it is now too late.

Ruth Deller of entertainment website lowculture.co.uk criticises Ramsay, citing his inclusion in the series as opportunistic, also stating: "Ramsay was by far people's most loathed this month. Brought in as a publicity stunt after the Brand/Ross affair and dropped shortly after, Andrew Sachs' Ramsay was a rare example of an old man character being seen by fans as a 'Mary-Sue' (i.e. someone we’re supposed to think is wonderful but generally don’t – usually reserved for someone much younger). There was great rejoicing when he left this month, and hopefully the best mature cast in soap will soon recover from this minor blip."

== Vinnie Powers ==
Vinnie Powers
- Coronation Street character
- Portrayed by: Ian Dunn
- Duration: 2009–2010
- First appearance: 28 May 2009
- Last appearance: 27 September 2010
In-universe information
- Wife: Janet Powers
- Daughters: Sian Powers

Vinnie Powers is the father of Sian Powers (Sacha Parkinson). He is first seen driving around Weatherfield looking for Sian's boyfriend Ryan Connor (Ben Thompson), when Vinnie finds him, he accuses Ryan of raping his daughter. Vinnie appears again in January 2010. During his return, he sends Sian packing to Southport to stay with her mother after discovering that she has been sexually active with Ryan.

Vinnie returns to the Street in on 27 September 2010, when Sian informs him that she is in a lesbian relationship with Sophie, and ends up in row with Sophie's mother Sally (Sally Dynevor), who defends their relationship.

== Vanessa ==
Vanessa
- Coronation Street character
- Portrayed by: Gabrielle Drake
- First appearance: 5 June 2009
- Last appearance: 8 June 2009

Vanessa, portrayed by Gabrielle Drake, is a guest character who appeared in June 2009. She met Bill Webster (Peter Armitage) on a singles night and became smitten with him after he falsely told her that he served in the army. She met up with Bill again for a double date with Pam Hobsworth (Kate Anthony) and a bachelor called Gilbert. In her efforts to impress Gilbert, Pam pretended to be a concert pianist but Vanessa soon saw through her. Drake's casting was announced on 20 April 2009 with a source telling The Mirror: "Gabrielle is involved in a funny storyline which sees her and her partner eyeing up Bill and Pam when they meet in a hotel." This was Drake's second role on Coronation Street after playing Inga Olsen in 1967.

== Leon ==
Leon
- Coronation Street character
- Portrayed by: Andrew Langtree
- First appearance: 3 July 2009
- Last appearance: 25 September 2009

Leon is a new love interest for Sean Tully (Antony Cotton). Leon made his first appearance on 3 July 2009 after he and Sean saw eye-to-eye at the gym while Sean was attending with Jason Grimshaw (Ryan Thomas). He was played by Andrew Langtree, whose casting was announced on 31 May 2009. Upon his casting, a Coronation Street source told The People: "Andrew's taken a bit of friendly ribbing from his mates after singing in front of the Queen - because his new character is one. But he's fitted in really well and the storylines are set to be a lot of fun."

A few weeks later, he told Leon that Jason was his boyfriend but then after talking to Julie Carp (Katy Cavanagh) he decided to tell Leon that Jason had "dumped" him and tried to ask him out, however it was revealed that Leon was not into camp men. Leon was captain of a gay football team which Jason joined, oblivious to this fact. Leon told Sean at a celebration party that he had fallen for Jason. Sean knew that his lies had gone too far and revealed to him that Jason was straight. Leon was still not convinced. However, after a drunk Jason regained consciousness after winning the "Mr. Gay Weatherfield" award, he began to wonder where he was. Leon was shocked and Sean quickly left with a heavily drunk Jason. In September 2009, Leon turned up at Jason and Tina McIntyre's (Michelle Keegan) housewarming party and angrily told Jason that he was disqualified from the Mr. Gay UK competition as he was not "one of his people" and accused Jason of homophobia, as a result of Sean's lies going too far.

A year after playing Leon, Langtree played Justin Gallagher in rival ITV soap opera Emmerdale between 2010-2012 on a recurring basis

== Liam Connor Jr ==
Liam Connor Jr
- Coronation Street character
- Portrayed by: Imogen Moore (2009); Logan Blake Pearson (2009); Ollie & Elliott Barnett (2010–2012); Charlie Wrenshall (2012–present)
- Duration: 2009–present
- First appearance: 3 July 2009
- Introduced by: Kim Crowther
In-universe information
- Father: Liam Connor
- Mother: Maria Connor
- Stepfather: Gary Windass
- Brothers: Paul Connor Jr.
- Half-sisters: Kelly Neelan (foster)
- Grandfathers: Barry Connor; Eric Sutherland
- Grandmothers: Helen Connor; Dot Sutherland
- Uncles: Kirk Sutherland; Paul Connor
- Aunts: Michelle Connor
- First cousins: Ali Neeson; Ruairi McDonald; Ryan Connor (adoptive)
- Other relatives: Carla Connor; Aidan Connor; Johnny Connor; Kate Connor; Susie Price

Liam Connor Jr. is the son of established characters Liam Connor (Rob James-Collier) and Maria Connor (Samia Longchambon). He was played by Imogen Moore and Logan Blake Pearson in July 2009 and twins Ollie & Elliott Barnett from 2010 to August 2012. Charlie Wrenshall took over the role in October 2012. The character was uncredited until January 2013. For his role as Liam, Wrenshall was longlisted for "Best Young Performer" at the 2024 Inside Soap Awards.

Liam is the son of Maria and Liam, who died nine months earlier. His older brother, Paul Connor Jr., was stillborn a year before Liam was born.

After his father Liam was killed in a hit and run organised by Tony Gordon (Gray O'Brien) in October 2008, Maria discovered she was pregnant. She gave birth to Liam in July 2009 with the help of Tony, who helped support Maria and was to later have a relationship with her. Maria named her son Liam in honour of her late husband, and also gave him the middle name Anthony, in honour of Tony.

When it was later discovered that Tony was a murderer, Maria moved to Ireland along with Liam to live with his grandparents Barry (Frank Grimes) and Helen Connor (Dearbhla Molloy), but they returned to Weatherfield in 2010, moving into the flat above Audrey Roberts' (Sue Nicholls) salon.

Liam would later find another father figure in the form of Marcus Dent (Charlie Condou) who in 2012 began a relationship with Maria. However, this family unit would come to an end in March 2014, when Marcus' affair with Todd Grimshaw (Bruno Langley) is exposed, prompting Maria to throw Marcus out and bar him from seeing Liam. After a nervous breakdown, Maria took Liam to see her parents Eric (Steve Money) and Dot Sutherland (Susie Baxter) in Cyprus, and when they returned she allowed Liam to see Marcus and made up with him. They said goodbye to Marcus when he left Weatherfield in July 2014 after splitting up from Todd.

In 2016 Maria married Argentinian Pablo Duarte (Shai Matheson), in order to help him return to the UK. She later made a full confession to the police after coming under suspicion of Caz Hammond's (Rhea Bailey) murder. She was cleared of that charge when Caz was found alive and well, but with the sham marriage charge hanging over her, Maria was forced to explain to Liam she may be going away for a while. On Christmas Eve 2016, Maria was sentenced to twelve months in prison, leaving Liam distraught. When Darryl, the pet rat of Craig Tinker (Colson Smith), died after chewing through some electric cables in February 2017, Liam called the police. Tearfully, he falsely confessed to what happened, hoping he would be taken to prison to be with Maria. His spirits were raised when Eva Price (Catherine Tyldesley) escorted him to visit Maria in prison, where her and Liam shared an emotional reunion. Maria was later released after only three months due to good behaviour.

In August 2021, Liam developed a chesty cough and while playing football in the street with Jack Webster (Kyran Bowes), he collapsed struggling to breathe. He was taken by ambulance to hospital, where he was diagnosed with asthma and given an inhaler.

In October 2023, Liam had an allergic reaction after trying a vape. He was later framed by his fellow Weatherfield High student Mason Radcliffe (Luca Toolan) of stealing Dylan Wilson (Liam McCheyne)'s trainers, when in reality, it was Mason who made Dylan hand over the trainers in compensation for Dylan's father Sean Tully (Antony Cotton) disposing of their remaining vapes. This caused Liam's stepfather Gary Windass (Mikey North), who guessed that Liam was framed, to confront Mason and warn him to stay away from Liam. However, this resulted in Mason sending a threatening voicemail to Liam. At school, Mason warns Liam to not tell on him again or Maria would suffer.

Liam was later confronted by Mason and his friends, who threw rubbish on him and called him a rat. When Mason starts filming the scene on his phone, Liam knocks out of his hand, resulting in Mason threatening him with a knife. Later, Liam tells his stepbrother Jake Windass (Bobby Bradshaw) what had happened, but asks him not to tell anyone as he does not want to be a grass. Afterwards, Liam was dismayed to learn that Jake had reported Mason to the police. That night, Liam received more vile messages from Mason.

Liam later gets Dylan into trouble at school when confronting him about selling vapes with Mason, which is overheard by the school's deputy headmistress Mrs Crawshaw. Mason later confronted Liam over this and ripped open his school bag and poured the contents on the ground before throwing the bag on top of a car and filmed Liam trying to get it.

In January 2024, Liam attempted to skip school to avoid Mason, but was caught out by Maria and Gary and was sent to school. Mason later took Liam's phone and made him beg for it in front of other students, before deciding not to give it back, making Liam storm off. Liam was later pinned to a wall by Mason, but managed to escape by setting off the school's fire alarm. However, Mason reported Liam's actions to Mrs Crawshaw and got Liam into trouble. Maria and Gary are informed of what had happened which makes Liam finally admitted to them that he was being bullied, but stated that it was done by kids they would not know. He also begged Maria not to tell the school, out of belief that it would only make the situation worse. Liam later learns that Jake was sent a message by Mason on his PlayStation 4 that if Liam wanted his phone back, he would have to meet him at school the following day. At first, Liam was not interested as he believed that meeting with Mason would result in a fight, but following a talk with Gary about how bullies only understand violence, Liam decides that it is time to stand up to Mason. At school the following day, Liam manages to get his phone back from Mason, but gets into a fight with Dylan after being called a loser by him. Mrs Crawshaw witnesses the fight and breaks it up, with Mason claiming that Liam attacked Dylan for no reason. Liam, out of fear of what the outcome would be if he told the truth, says that Mason was right. This results in Liam being suspended from school.

The next day, Liam goes to the police station with Maria for questioning after Sean reported him. Liam was read Dylan's statement which said that Liam was to blame for the fight, to which Liam agreed. The police then told Liam that the matter would be resolved if he apologised to Dylan as this was his first offence. At school, in front of Maria, Gary, Sean and Mrs Crawshaw, Liam apologies to Dylan, but is still suspended. Whilst the adults talk, Liam wishes that things could go back to normal, only for Dylan to tell him that Mason would be waiting for him when he returns to school. Liam later assists Gary at his furniture shop.

Liam later returns to school following his suspension and is once again targeted by Mason, who destroys a puppet he had brought in whilst Dylan films it. Liam declares his intentions not to return to school. Liam later receives a follower request on social media which he accepts. However, he is later annoyed to learn that the person was Maria, who did it in order to find proof of him being bullied by Mason and Dylan in order to show it to Mrs Crawshaw as she could not do anything without proof. However, before Maria and Gary can use the abusive messages Mason and Dylan sent Liam online as evidence, they find that the messages have been deleted after Mason and Dylan found out what they planned to do with the messages. This makes Maria decide that the only way to stop the bullying would be to have Liam move to a different school. Later, unbeknownst to Maria and Gary, Liam searches on a laptop he borrowed from school about suicide.

After Maria returns the laptop to the school, Liam visits her at work and tells her that he loves her. Later, after Maria and Gary learn from Mrs Crawshaw about Liam searching about suicide on the laptop, the pair rush back home to stop Liam from committing suicide. Fortunately, Liam decides not to kill himself and speaks about what Mason and Dylan did to him. Maria assures Liam that she would not let them hurt him again before deciding that Liam should be home schooled. Liam also learns from Mrs Crawshaw that Mason and Dylan would be put in isolation for their actions.

Liam, Maria and Gary later go to Roy's Rolls where they encounter Mason, who tries to act friendly to Liam, only for Maria to lash out at him. Liam later witnesses Mason bullying another boy at school and tells Jake about it, but refuses to report it out of fear.

== Zoe ==
Zoe
- Coronation Street character
- Portrayed by: Kirsty-Leigh Porter
- First appearance: 25 September 2009
- Last appearance: 21 December 2009

Zoe, played by Kirsty-Leigh Porter, first appeared in September 2009 at Jason Grimshaw (Ryan Thomas) and Tina McIntyre's (Michelle Keegan) housewarming party as the new girlfriend of David Platt (Jack P. Shepherd). Porter's casting was announced on 27 July 2009. She reappeared in November, when David introduced her to his mother Gail (Helen Worth) and partner Joe McIntyre (Reece Dinsdale). She helped Kirk (Andrew Whyment) and Chesney (Sam Aston) paint the house when John Stape (Graeme Hawley) was due home from prison. When David appeared more concerned for a drunken Tina recklessly wandering the street after a fallout with Jason, Zoe was convinced he still had feelings for Tina and she warned him that she'd call her ex-boyfriend if he left. Zoe stormed off after he did.

Porter told the soap's official website: "I'm absolutely delighted. Me and my family have been lifelong Corrie fans and - if [it's] possible - I think my mum is even more excited than I am!" She continued: "I can't wait to start working with Jack [P. Shepherd] and the rest of the cast."

== Jake Harman ==
Jake Harman
- Coronation Street character
- Portrayed by: Kenny Doughty
- First appearance: 28 October 2009
- Last appearance: 31 December 2009
In-universe information
- Occupation: Builder

Jake Harman, played by Kenny Doughty, is introduced as a love interest for Michelle Connor (Kym Marsh). He made his on-screen debut on 28 October 2009, when Dev Alahan (Jimmi Harkishin) hired him to fix Michelle's roof. However, he fell from the ladder and Michelle had to get out of the bath to stop him from falling. In the midst of their encounter, Michelle dropped her towel and he saw her stark naked, much to her embarrassment. Jake kissed her and a shocked Michelle got rid of him.

The next day, Jake tries the same trick again and Michelle has him arrested. Meanwhile, Dev refuses to pay for Jake's work on the roof, leading to Jake removing half the tiles from Dev's own roof. In an attempt to go on a date with Michelle, he opts to "return the favour" and goes into the Rover Return, wearing just a towel - threatening to drop it if she declines his invitation, Michelle agrees and later goes on a date after she admits she overreacted. Jake then gets a job offer in Cumbria and Michelle, although tempted, doesn't join him.

Jake returns on New Year's Eve to take Michelle out on one last date together to a hotel as he announces that he will be leaving soon to do a job away from Manchester.

== George Wilson ==
George Wilson
- Coronation Street character
- Portrayed by: Anthony Valentine
- Duration: 2009–2010
- First appearance: 2 November 2009
- Last appearance: 10 May 2010
- Introduced by: Kim Crowther
In-universe information
- Occupation: Businessman
- Wife: Eve Wilson (1983–)
- Daughters: Lucy Richards
- Grandsons: Simon Barlow

George Wilson is the father of Peter Barlow's (Chris Gascoyne) late wife Lucy (Katy Carmichael). On his first appearance, Peter is hostile towards him, however, he later softens and agrees to let him see his grandson Simon (Alex Bain). George also visits Ken (William Roache) and Deirdre Barlow (Anne Kirkbride), while Deirdre's mother Blanche (Maggie Jones) is smitten with him.

On 20 November 2009, George and second wife Eve join the Barlows for dinner. However, Blanche gets drunk and reveals Peter's past as an alcoholic and girlfriend Leanne's (Jane Danson) as a hooker and arsonist. George storms out but later apologises for his behaviour. George gradually begins to use his considerable wealth to win round Peter, Simon and Leanne, much to Ken's chagrin. He also supports Peter's plans to open a bar on the Street and assists him in the development, prompting Ken to continually argue with both George and Peter.

After Peter is admitted to rehab to recover, in February 2010, George takes custody of Simon much to the dislike of Peter who is arrested after confronting and threatening George at his home. George later announces to Eve that he plans to take full custody of Simon.

The following month while on a short holiday in Blackpool, Simon runs away from George and Eve, which leads to Peter quickly rushing to Blackpool to find his son. The Barlows and The Wilsons are in dismay as they spend hours looking for Simon. However, Simon returns to Weatherfield the following day after taking a train home. Peter and his family are delighted to have Simon back to them but Peter later lets George know that he wants him to stay away from his son before George expresses how sorry he is about the incident.

George later sends a wreath at Blanche's funeral and allows Leanne's former husband, Nick Tilsley (Ben Price), to use the premises that was originally going to be used as their bar as a temporary factory after UnderWorld is burnt down by Carla Connor's (Alison King) former husband Tony Gordon (Gray O'Brien), who had escaped from prison.

== Eve Wilson ==
Eve Wilson
- Coronation Street character
- Portrayed by: Sabina Franklyn
- Duration: 2009–2010
- First appearance: 5 November 2009
- Last appearance: 12 March 2010
- Introduced by: Kim Crowther
In-universe information
- Occupation: Housewife
- Husband: George Wilson (1983–)

Eve Wilson is portrayed by actor Sabina Franklyn. She is the second wife of George Wilson (Anthony Valentine), Simon Barlow's (Alex Bain) grandfather.

On 20 November 2009, George and Eve join the Barlows for dinner. However, Blanche Hunt (Maggie Jones) gets drunk and reveals Peter Barlow's (Chris Gascoyne) past as an alcoholic and Leanne Battersby's (Jane Danson) as a hooker and arsonist. George storms out but later apologizes for his behaviour.

After Peter ruins the opening of his new bar and is admitted to rehab, George and Eve take custody of Simon as they worry about his well-being. While they holiday in Blackpool, George reveals his plans to take Simon away from the Barlows, an idea which Eve firmly opposes. This leads to an argument between the couple, which Simon overhears and subsequently disappears. Simon later makes his way home to a thrilled Peter and Leanne who tell George to stay way from Simon.

== Rick Neelan ==
Rick Neelan
- Coronation Street character
- Portrayed by: Greg Wood
- Duration: 2009–2010, 2012, 2019, 2022
- First appearance: 9 November 2009
- Last appearance: 21 September 2022
- Introduced by: Kim Crowther (2009); Phil Collinson (2012); Iain MacLeod (2019, 2022)
In-universe information
- Occupation: Loan shark
- Wife: Laura Neelan (divorced)
- Sons: Unnamed son
- Daughters: Kelly Neelan

Rick Neelan, played by Greg Wood, made his first screen appearance during the episode broadcast on 9 November 2009. In April 2012, it was announced Wood would be reprising his role. Rick began appearing from 7 May 2012.

Rick is a loan shark who gives a loan to Joe McIntyre (Reece Dinsdale), who needs money due to being in debt. After Joe fails to pay back the money, Rick goes to his house and Joe gives him his van and promises him he will get the rest of the money. Rick returns numerous times in the following months. He pretends to be interested in buying Joe's fiancée Gail Platt's (Helen Worth) house, before demanding money from Joe. He then pretends to be interested in Joe's daughter Tina's (Michelle Keegan) flat. Joe then threatens Rick telling him to stay away from him and his family, but Rick warns him to have the money soon.

Joe borrows £4,000 from Gail's father Ted Page (Michael Byrne) and gives it to Rick and tells him he will not get anything else from him and that their debt is settled, which Rick agrees with. However, a week later Rick turns up at Joe's wedding and threatens him that he wants £500 a week for the next 10 weeks making a total of £5000 and that this is "interest". He also tells Joe that if he doesn't pay up he will break his arms and legs. Two weeks later after Joe and Gail return from their honeymoon Joe is walking home from the pub alone and Rick's car pulls up alongside Joe and Rick has one of his heavies. Rick asks Joe for his next instalment but as Joe is unable to pay Rick and the heavy gets out and chase him. Joe is able to outrun them and hides in the ginnel, whilst Rick looks around for him, unsuccessfully.

A few weeks later, after Joe's death, Rick returns to the Street and threatens Gail on her doorstep, demanding his money. She refuses to give him any money and he leaves. The next day Rick returns again and after visiting Gail, again unsuccessfully, he confronts Tina and her boyfriend Jason Grimshaw (Ryan Thomas) at the door of their flat. Jason tells Rick he will not be getting any money off them. Rick goes to the local newsagents, The Kabin, and returns with a newspaper, which he sets alight before putting it through Jason and Tina's letter box. After Jason puts the fire out and runs out into the street, Rick waves at Jason and speeds off in his car before Jason can catch him. A couple of weeks later the police inform Gail and Tina that they are questioning Rick in connection with Joe's death. Later on they confirm that he will to be charged with his previous crimes but that he was not involved in Joe's death.

In May 2012, Rick returns to collect money from a loan that he gave to Terry Duckworth (Nigel Pivaro). Terry owes Rick £19,000 and Tina, who is now dating Terry's son Tommy's (Chris Fountain), recognizes him. After Rick and two heavies threaten Tina in a new lap-dancing club Terry is planning on opening, Tommy pays £10,000 of the debt with money he had inherited from his late grandfather, before Terry flees, leaving Tommy to pay the rest of the debt.

After asking Tommy to perform a series of crimes to pay back his father's debt, Rick orders Tommy to drop off a bag of drugs in Amsterdam. Tina is outraged that Tommy is working for the man she holds responsible for her father's death and takes the drugs from the car and drives to the local canal. She rings Rick and threatens to throw the drugs into the canal. Rick arrives at the scene, but has kidnapped Tina's friend Rita Sullivan (Barbara Knox) who is due to get married. After a confrontation and stand-off by the canalside in which Rick threatens to throw Rita into the canal, Tina is forced to hand over the drugs and Rick lets go of Rita, picks up the drugs and gets ready to leave for Amsterdam. But unbeknownst to Rick, Tina had already informed the police of his plan and they arrive just as he is leaving, led by Kirsty Soames (Natalie Gumede) who was undercover, and arrest Rick. He is last seen being put into the back of a police van. The next day Kirsty informs Tina that Rick is facing a prison sentence of at least eight years and that they are rounding up his gang.

By 2019, Rick was released from prison, and turned up at the Builder's Yard in Weatherfield on 31 March; demanding £9,000 owed to him by local builder Gary Windass (Mikey North). However, Gary did not have the money on him, but assured Rick he would get him his money as soon as he could. Rick threatened Gary and later showed up outside 8 Coronation Street, where he told Gary he had until 6pm the next day to get him his money; and pointed out the fact that 9 years ago, an ex-customer of his named "Joe McIntyre", used to live at the same house; until he accidentally drowned. Gary uses the money that Peter Barlow (Chris Gascoyne) gives him as a bribe to pay off Rick, but he later returns after Sarah Platt (Tina O'Brien), Leanne Battersby (Jane Danson) and Toyah Battersby (Georgia Taylor) break into his office and steal his customer's passports. Assuming Gary took the passports, Rick and Gary have a showdown in the woods where in self defence, Gary hits Rick in the head with a rock and buries his body in the woods, Later as the area became too crowded along with dogs sniffing the area, Gary then moves the body elsewhere.

== PC Brody ==
PC Brody
- Coronation Street character
- Portrayed by: Daniel Jillings
- Duration: 2009–2010, 2021
- First appearance: 1 December 2009
- Last appearance: 4 October 2021
In-universe information
- Occupation: Police constable

PC Brody is a policeman who made several visits to the street. He first appeared in December 2009 in which John Stape (Graeme Hawley) was questioned over supposedly trying to assault former kidnap victim Rosie Webster (Helen Flanagan), although he was released when it turned out Rosie lied. He returned in September 2010 when looking into Gary Windass' assault on someone when out drinking, although Gary got released due to lack of evidence. Upon his original stint, between 2009-2010, he was simply credited as Police Constable.

Brody's next appearance came eleven years later in which he played a slightly bigger role in a racism storyline, in which he stopped footballer James Bailey (Nathan Graham) and his brother, Michael Bailey (Ryan Russell) after seeing him driving a luxury car. Brody claimed that they were driving erratically, which they weren't. James then made a complaint that he was racially profiled, but this was dropped. However, James appealed, which led to witness PC Craig Tinker (Colson Smith) being re-interviewed. James subsequently received a letter upholding his complaint and proffering an official apology for the way he has been treated. James' parents, Ed (Trevor Michael Georges) and Aggie Bailey (Lorna Laidlaw) congratulated him on receiving an apology, but James wasn't sure if his victory really amounts to much. Aggie tells him that every minor victory is a positive step taken and says how proud she is for him. Brody calls into 3 Coronation Street, which is the Bailey family home to apologise to James in person for his behaviour. Brody insists that he is not a racist, but James explains to him that he made a judgement about him based upon his appearance and urges Brody to do better in the future.

== Matt Davis ==
Matt Davis
- Coronation Street character
- Portrayed by: Christopher Colquhoun
- Duration: 2009–2010
- First appearance: 4 December 2009
- Last appearance: 22 February 2010

Matt Davis is the fiancé of Sunita Alahan (Shobna Gulati). He first appeared on 4 December 2009, as an acquaintance of Dev Alahan (Jimmi Harkishin) at the golf club. Dev soon discovered Matt was engaged to his ex Sunita, and was extremely jealous, barging into their house and arguing with them both several times, claiming he didn't want somebody else bringing up his kids. Dev and Sunita eventually reached a truce and all three ended up on better terms. Matt himself, however, began to feel sidelined when Dev took a more active role in looking after the kids and cracks started to show in his relationship with Sunita. In mid-January 2010, Sunita informed a secretly delighted Dev that she and Matt had broken up.

Matt briefly returned on 22 February 2010 to try and resolve things with Sunita but was surprised when Dev was there and assumed he had got back with Sunita himself. In actuality, Dev was pretending to be married to Sunita to fool her aunts, Upma and Grishma. After Dev told the aunts that Matt was the kids' Maths tutor, a confused and rejected Matt left.

== Claudia Colby ==
Claudia Colby
- Coronation Street character
- Portrayed by: Rula Lenska
- Duration: 2009–2011, 2018–2022
- First appearance: 18 December 2009
- Last appearance: 15 August 2022
- Introduced by: Kim Crowther (2009); Phil Collinson (2010); Kate Oates (2018); Iain MacLeod (2021, 2022)
In-universe information
- Occupation: Hair stylist Businesswoman

Claudia Colby was introduced as an old friend of Audrey Roberts (Sue Nicholls).

On 5 October 2009, it was announced that Rula Lenska would portray Claudia. A Coronation Street spokesperson said: "Rula will play a glamorous friend of Audrey's who she meets up with at a function. She makes Audrey think about her life and what she wants out of it. She will film her scenes on Friday 16 October and will appear on screen in the run-up to Christmas."

In 2010, Nicholls has revealed that Lenska would return to Coronation Street for a future storyline. Talking about Audrey and Claudia's relationship, Nicholls said, "Yes, she's a little bit like the wicked witch, isn't she? It's great fun. In my head, Claudia is that friend you know is always going to be a pain. She's the one who says the wrong thing, is always trying to out do you and has a habit of saying really horrid things even though she thinks they're a joke. But I think in a funny way they really do get on. She gets quite drunk at the party and when Audrey makes her announcement she has no qualms about filling Gail in on Lewis' past." She made a return in later 2010. In December 2010, it was reported that Claudia may become landlady of the local pub The Rovers Return replacing Liz McDonald (Beverley Callard), a spokesperson said "Claudia ticks all the boxes for a feisty, no-nonsense landlady of a certain age. She could certainly make a great Rovers boss to follow in Liz's footsteps." However, producer Phil Collinson later said the storyline suggestion was untrue.

In May 2011, it was announced that Lenska was to leave the serial in order to appear in theatre. A spokesperson for the serial stated: "We've loved having Rula. She's been absolutely brilliant as Claudia and we hope one day she'll return." Her departure will allow fellow characters Audrey and Marc to pursue a relationship. Producers decided to "leave the door open" for a possible return in the future as Claudia has proven to be a popular character.

On 19 March 2018, it was announced Lenska would reprise the role of Claudia in a new storyline with Audrey in a bid to bring back light-heartedness to the show. Claudia returned on 25 July 2018.

After two years she departed in April 2020. Lenska reprised the part for Norris Cole's funeral in 2021, and will return again in 2022.

=== Storylines ===
==== 2009–2011 ====
Claudia attended a Weatherfield Traders' Association lunch, escorted by Lewis Archer (Nigel Havers), who she often hired for functions. Audrey also went and was shocked that Claudia employed a male escort, but Claudia explained that there was no sex involved and that it was just for appearances. Later, Claudia met up with Audrey again and they went to a dinner dance together. Lewis was also attending, escorting Rita Sullivan (Barbara Knox). Claudia was surprised to find out that Audrey had hired Lewis several times and had fallen for him. She reminded Audrey that Lewis's charms were contractual and when she met Audrey and Lewis again a couple of months later in a restaurant she made it quite clear that she still regarded Lewis as contactable.

Claudia's doubts about Lewis' reliability as a permanent suitor for Audrey were to be proved right. On 13 August 2010, Claudia attended a party Audrey's daughter, Gail McIntyre (Helen Worth), threw for Audrey and Lewis who were moving abroad to run a hotel. However, Lewis chose that day to vanish from Audrey's life and Audrey was confronted by footage of him defrauding Barlow's Bookies and diverting Deirdre Barlow's (Anne Kirkbride) attention by kissing her. Claudia got drunk with Rita, and delighted in the floor show as Gail pushed a Manchester tart into Deirdre's face. Claudia was not seen again until she arrived in The Rovers on New Year's Eve 2010, where she donated the prize of luxury treatments in Perm Suspect to the evening's charity raffle and befriended locals. The prize was won by a disgruntled Audrey, who had already had her nose put out of joint after her donation of a pedicure and manicure at Audrey's salon was somewhat dwarfed by Claudia's generosity.

Claudia was keen to grow her business and initially showed interest in purchasing the butchers premises on Victoria Street from Claire Peacock (Julia Haworth) to convert into a rival salon to Audrey's salon. When Audrey claimed her free hair treatment at Perm Suspect, Claudia revealed that she was no longer interested in buying the premises as it smelt of meat. She asked if Audrey was interested in selling to her, an offer that was flatly refused. Claudia told Audrey that she had set her sights on Marc Selby (Andrew Hall), a client sat near them who had recently been widowed and not long after the pair start dating. In March 2011, while having her hair done one of Audrey's elderly clients dies, Claudia and Audrey are left horrified. Soon after, Claudia begins to suspect Marc is having an affair and Audrey joins Claudia in spying on him at his home. Claudia is angered to see a woman leaving his house. Later, Marc tries to explain himself to Claudia by saying that the woman was his sister, but Claudia does not believe him. In April 2011, Claudia spots a receipt in Marc's wallet and assumes it is a gift for her, totally oblivious to knowing it is in fact for his alter-ego "Marcia".

In May 2011, Claudia suspects that Audrey is the woman Marc is seeing behind her back. Her suspicions arise when she spots Audrey at Marc's house, only to be shocked when Marcia enters the room; a disgusted Claudia storms out. A few weeks later, Claudia meets Audrey in The Rovers in an attempt to build bridges, however, Marc appears from the bathroom, having been with Audrey. A furious Claudia walks out of The Rovers firing insults at Audrey and Marc and telling them she does not want to see them again, before leaving. She is later mentioned when Deirdre recommends Claudia's hair salon against Audrey's salon to newcomer, Stella Price (Michelle Collins). In 2012, Rita mentions that she had to go to Claudia's salon as Audrey was fully booked, complaining about the loud music.

=== Reintroduction (2018) ===
Claudia returns to Weatherfield in July 2018, amidst a feud between Audrey and her stylist, Maria Connor (Samia Longchambon). Seizing a chance to annoy Audrey, Claudia offers Maria the opportunity to run her own salon under Claudia's chain, however she demanded that Maria provide the money to pay for the new salon immediately. After failing to gain investment from Carla Connor (Alison King), Maria is invested in by Rita, who can see how spiteful Audrey is being about the situation. At the same time, Claudia becomes close friends with Ken Barlow (William Roache), and supports him when he learns that his pregnant daughter-in-law, Sinead Tinker (Katie McGlynn), has been diagnosed with cervical cancer. Eventually, when both Claudia and Audrey are invited to an awards ceremony for the North West Salons Awards, their feud reaches breaking point when Claudia nominates Audrey for the lifetime achievement award, hoping to show rival salons that Audrey should be slowing down and eventually drop out of hairdressing forever. However, when presented with a bouquet of flowers, Audrey throws the flowers at Claudia, who dramatically knocks all the glasses over on the table. Later, when she sees how Maria and Audrey are starting to become close again, Claudia reminds Maria that she works for her now, and not to be as friendly with Audrey anymore.

Claudia begins a relationship with Ken in 2019. After being scammed out of all her money, Audrey decides to sell her share of the salon to Claudia, infuriating Audrey's grandson, David Platt (Jack P. Shepherd), who squirts shampoo over both Audrey and Claudia. When Ken's son, Peter Barlow (Chris Gascoyne), suffers an alcohol relapse, Claudia pays for Peter to enter rehab. Claudia later supports Audrey when it transpires that her eldest grandson, Nick Tilsley (Ben Price), was the culprit who scammed her out of her money.

In 2020, Claudia began to suggest to Ken they move to a retirement community. Ken, after some consideration, accepts. In April 2020, Ken breaks up with Claudia and returns to 1 Coronation Street. The following year, Claudia returns following Norris Cole's (Malcolm Hebden) death.

== Other characters ==
Character	Episode date(s)	Actor	Circumstances
Christina	6 March	Sarah-Jayne Steed	A woman who dropped in at the bookies soon after Peter Barlow's (Chris Gascoyne) return to Weatherfield. Peter's employee at the bookies, Leanne Battersby (Jane Danson), who also happened to be Peter's girlfriend, believed he'd spent his time away in rehab, but Christina said that he'd left rehab early to spend time with a mate on her father's yacht in the Mediterranean, and that she'd had a fling with him. Christina had no idea of Leanne's existence, and seemed more amused than annoyed at being kept in the dark by Peter. When Peter attempted to deny their affair, Christina told him to grow up, and quickly departed.
Justin Turner	20 March – 11 May	Ralph Gassman	A photographer who worked with Tara Mandal (Ayesha Dharker) in her new art gallery. He took photos which Tara considered high quality, but which her boyfriend and backer Dev Alahan (Jimmi Harkishin) saw as difficult to sell. Dev secretly purchased some of the photos to boost Tara's confidence, but when she found out, she dumped him. Before she took him back, he slept with Lisa Dalton (Ruth Alexander Rubin) and lied to Tara about it. When Tara learned of his fling, she worked with Justin to convince Dev to take naked photographs, making him believe they would be kept private. Instead, Tara had a gathering in the middle of the Street and horrified Dev by unveiling a huge naked photo with LIAR scrawled across his privates in red paint.
Private Investigator	23 March – 20 April	John Branwell	A private investigator who was hired by Tony Gordon (Gray O'Brien) to gather information on new business partner Luke Strong (Craig Kelly). After a few weeks, Tom Kerrigan (Philip McGinley) told Luke he was being followed, and Luke led the investigator on a wild goose chase. Tony parted ways with him, but did learn about the poor state of Luke's finances.
Mr. Gilbert	5–8 June	John Owens	A man who briefly courted Pam Hobsworth (Kate Anthony). When going out for a meal, along with Vanessa and Bill Webster (Peter Armitage), Vanessa suggested Pam play the piano for everyone, since she claimed to be a pianist. However, Pam fooled him by saying that she had injured her wrist and needed him to get some ice. He went for help but Vanessa knew that Pam was lying.
Howard Lee	5 June – 16 March 2012, 29 April 2019 – 16 November 2020	Howard Lee	The leader of an Alcoholics Anonymous group Peter Barlow (Chris Gascoyne) attended. He initially appeared intermittently between 2009 and 2012, when he had contact with Peter through AA and again between 2019 and 2020.
Ross	5 June – 20 July	Lee Oakes	A member of the Alcoholics Anonymous group which Peter Barlow (Chris Gascoyne) joined. The first time Peter attended the group, Ross's graphic stories upset Peter and made him leave early. Peter began attending meetings on a more regular basis, and invited his family. When Ross proceeded to tell another long story, Blanche Hunt (Maggie Jones) told him to stop feeling sorry for himself. This led to finger-pointing and confessions from the rest of the Barlow family. Before they stormed out, Ken Barlow (William Roache) offered some words of comfort to Ross.
Naomi Collins	4–7 September	Andrea Lowe	A nurse who briefly dated Peter Barlow (Chris Gascoyne).Naomi first saw Peter while she was having a drink with a mate in the Rovers. He managed to convince her to go out on a date with him. They spent the night together, and the next morning, Blanche Hunt (Maggie Jones), Ken Barlow (William Roache), and Peter's young son Simon Barlow (Alex Bain) walked in on them kissing in the living room. Simon joined Naomi and Peter for a meal, but Simon felt like Naomi did not want him around, so Peter broke up with her.
Sheila Wheeler	28 September – 9 October	Janice Connolly	A woman who applied for the position of a shop assistant at The Kabin to work for Norris Cole (Malcolm Hebden). However, Norris soon found her too irritating to work with and sacked her.
Joan	22–28 October	Maggie Tagney	A woman who applied for the position of a shop assistant at The Kabin to work for Norris Cole (Malcolm Hebden). Norris then hired her but then found her very quiet and struggled to work with her. Though not sacking her on-screen, he gave her an angry look and the scene ended. In the next scene set in the Kabin, Norris is seen writing another job vacancy notice, which implied that he had dismissed Joan.
Horace Steel	6 November	Robert Maxfield	A very brief assistant to Norris Cole (Malcolm Hebden) at The Kabin. The character was described as similar to Norris, (nosey and likes to talk a lot.) On his first appearance, Norris was impressed by their share of similar values, tendency to gossip and act quite snobbish. However, it seemed he was worse than Norris at upsetting customers - calling Simon Barlow (Alex Bain) rude after Simon innocently said he looked like Norris. Norris told him they needed a little chat. Horace later walked out of the Kabin, which implied that he had lost his job.
Bernie Sayers	24 November – 14 December	Jennifer Hennessy	A golf instructor who Dev Alahan (Jimmi Harkishin) took golf lessons from to try to be better than Steve McDonald (Simon Gregson). After his first lesson, Dev took Bernie to the Rovers where Steve was agitated upon seeing her; it soon transpired Steve had also been taking golf lessons with her without Dev's knowledge. Bernie soon began a relationship with Dev. Dev later discovered that ex-wife Sunita Parekh (Shobna Gulati) was engaged to Matt Davis (Christopher Colquhoun), a man Bernie was also giving golf lessons to. After several confrontations with them, Dev ordered Bernie to cancel Matt's lessons and argued with her about his children. On 14 December, Dev tried to make it up with Bernie over lunch by asking her to move in with him. Bernie however, knew he was only doing it to get back at Sunita and dumped him.
