= List of Coronation Street characters introduced in 2008 =

The following is a list of characters that first appeared in the ITV soap opera Coronation Street in 2008, by order of first appearance.

== Tina McIntyre ==
Tina McIntyre, played by Michelle Keegan, made her first appearance on 7 January 2008, Tina cemented herself as the new "gobby goddess" of Weatherfield. Tina was initially introduced as a new girlfriend for established character, David Platt (Jack P. Shepherd). She was shortly joined by her father, Joe (Reece Dinsdale), who ended up marrying David's mother, Gail (Helen Worth). In February 2010, Joe died after faking his own death in an insurance scam, which devastated Tina.

Since then, Tina has highlighted issues such as perjury, abortion and surrogacy. She has had a few relationships, including ones with David, Graeme Proctor (Craig Gazey), Tommy Duckworth (Chris Fountain), Dr. Matt Carter (Oliver Mellor) and Jason Grimshaw (Ryan Thomas). In May 2013, Tina gave birth to Jake Windass, whose biological parents are Izzy Armstrong (Cherylee Houston) and Gary Windass (Mikey North), but Tina acted as a surrogate for the couple. Tina decided she wanted to keep the baby and name him after Joe, infuriating the Windasses and Anna (Debbie Rush) slapped Tina. Tina has also developed an unbreakable friendship with Rita Sullivan (Barbara Knox) since her first appearance in January 2008, although they have had their disagreements. In late 2013, Tina began an affair with Peter Barlow (Chris Gascoyne), who was married to Carla Connor (Alison King). Tina's boss Liz McDonald (Beverley Callard) and her son Steve (Simon Gregson) eventually found out. Tina has also had many feuds, particularly with Kylie Platt (Paula Lane), Kirsty Soames (Natalie Gumede) and Tracy Barlow (Kate Ford).

In May 2014, Peter decides to tell Carla about his affair with Tina and promised Tina that they will leave Weatherfield together. Meanwhile, Tina and Rita argue and Rita slaps her for insulting Rita's marital status. Tina is later visited by Rob Donovan (Marc Baylis), and they argue. Tina falls from the balcony but survives that so Rob beats her with a metal pipe to ensure that she dies. Tina's final scenes aired on 2 June 2014, where she died in hospital, ending 6 years on Coronation Street.

== Barry Connor ==
Barry Connor
- Coronation Street character
- Portrayed by: Frank Grimes
- Duration: 2008–2009, 2013, 2015
- First appearance: 4 February 2008
- Last appearance: 25 May 2015
- Introduced by: Steve Frost (2008); Kym Crowther (2009); Stuart Blackburn (2013, 2015)
In-universe information
- Father: Rory Connor
- Wife: Helen Connor
- Sons: Liam Connor; Paul Connor
- Daughters: Michelle Connor
- Grandsons: Ali Neeson; Ryan Connor (adoptive); Paul Connor Jr. Liam Connor Jr. Ruairi McDonald
- Uncles: James Connor
- First cousins: Johnny Connor
- Other relatives: Aidan Connor; Carla Connor; Kate Connor

Barrington "Barry" Connor is the father of Paul (Sean Gallagher), Liam (Rob James-Collier) and Michelle Connor (Kym Marsh). Barry first appeared in February 2008 along with his wife, Helen, and nephew, Tom Kerrigan (Philip McGinley), to attend Liam's wedding to Maria Sutherland (Samia Ghadie). He returned to the street on 20 October after hearing news of Liam's death in a hit and run accident. He and Helen went home after apologising to Carla (Alison King) for telling her what to do. Barry and Helen returned on 24 November 2008 to celebrate their fortieth wedding anniversary.

Barry and Helen returned in July 2009 to meet their new grandson, Liam, but after clashing with Maria over Tony's involvement in baby Liam's life, they returned to Ireland. They returned in October for the first anniversary of Liam's death and they were horrified by Maria and Tony Gordon's (Gray O'Brien) relationship. They eventually accepted it, however, and attended baby Liam's christening and left Weatherfield on good terms with Maria and Tony. They returned again in November after Tony told the police and Maria that he did arrange for Liam to be killed. Michelle rang Barry and Helen to tell them the horrifying news. They booked a flight to Manchester immediately and comforted Maria. Deciding she needed to leave Weatherfield for a while, Maria and Liam went to Ireland to stay with Barry and Helen. In the end, he returns to Ireland after making a pass at Liz.

He returned on 4 October 2013, telling Michelle initially that her mother had gone on holiday with a friend from her book club. Suspicious, Michelle rang her parents' home to check and her mother was there but insisted that Michelle ask her father why they had separated. Michelle tried to insist that her father talk to her mother but that just led to more arguments. When Michelle caught a drunk Barry trying to seduce Liz, she was furious and insists that he return to Ireland to sort things out with Helen, but Barry tries to talk his way out of it. Eventually, he gave up and admits that Helen caught Barry sleeping with one of her friends, Aoife. Michelle was angry and booked two flights to Ireland with Barry to sort it out with Helen.

On 25 May 2015, Barry and Helen returned for Michelle's wedding to Steve McDonald (Simon Gregson), where he walked Michelle down the aisle.

On 27 January to 18 February 2017, Michelle and Steve stayed with Barry and Helen in Ireland following the loss of their stillborn son Ruairi.

== Helen Connor ==
Helen Connor
- Coronation Street character
- Portrayed by: Sorcha Cusack (2008); Dearbhla Molloy (2009, 2015)
- Duration: 2008–2009, 2015
- First appearance: 4 February 2008
- Last appearance: 25 May 2015
In-universe information
- Brothers: Brendan Kerrigan
- Husband: Barry Connor
- Sons: Liam Connor; Paul Connor
- Daughters: Michelle Connor
- Grandsons: Ali Neeson; Ryan Connor (adoptive); Paul Connor Jr. Liam Connor Jr. Ruairi McDonald
- Nephews: Tom Kerrigan

Helen Connor is the mother of Paul (Sean Gallagher), Liam (Rob James-Collier) and Michelle Connor (Kym Marsh).

Helen first appears in February 2008 along with her husband, Barry and nephew, Tom Kerrigan (Philip McGinley), to attend Liam and Maria's wedding. She returns to the street on 20 October 2008, after hearing that Liam has been killed in a hit and run accident. She and Barry return to Ireland after apologising to Carla (Alison King) for telling her what to do. Helen and Barry return on 24 November 2008 for their 40th wedding anniversary.

Helen returns along with Barry in July 2009 to visit their new grandson, Liam. She is not happy with Tony Gordon's (Gray O'Brien) presence in the house and makes sure that Tony and Maria are aware of this. Helen soon begins arguing with Maria, accusing her of trying to replace Liam with Tony. Helen continues to show her dislike of Tony, and when she returns to the cobbles in October 2009, for baby Liam's christening, she tells him that she does not approve of the situation but is willing to be civil. During their stay, they visit Liam Sr's grave, and upon returning discovers that Maria and Tony are engaged. Helen is enraged, accusing Maria of betraying Liam's memory. Helen later softened on the situation, and after attending Liam's christening, she and Barry returned to Ireland on good terms with Maria and Tony.

On 20 November, Helen and Barry returned after Tony Gordon handed himself into police and admitted that he had Liam killed. The two supported Maria, and she soon decided she wanted to go to Ireland with them and the baby rather than stay in Weatherfield and be reminded of Tony. They left on 26 November. In June 2010, she rang The Rovers wanting to speak to Michelle but ended up speaking to Ciaran (Keith Duffy). The two had a long, friendly conversation and exchanged stories about Michelle. She rang again later that week and once again spoke to Ciaran, who told her that he loved her lemon drizzle cake (which she'd sent to Michelle), when actually he did not – something which Michelle pointed out. Ciaran replied to Michelle that her mother had a 'sexy voice'.

On 25 May 2015, Helen and Barry returned for Michelle's wedding to Steve McDonald (Simon Gregson).

From 27 January to 18 February 2017, Michelle and Steve stayed with Helen and Barry in Ireland following the loss of their stillborn son Ruairi.

In January 2018, Helen texted Michelle and wished Robert Preston (Tristan Gemmill), her fiancé, good luck with his surgery to remove his testicular cancer.

== Tom Kerrigan ==
Tom Kerrigan
- Coronation Street character
- Portrayed by: Philip McGinley
- Duration: 2008–2009
- First appearance: 6 February 2008
- Last appearance: 24 April 2009
In-universe information
- Occupation: Businessman
- Father: Brendan Kerrigan
- Mother: Sheila Kerrigan
- Aunts: Helen Connor
- First cousins: Michelle Connor; Liam Connor; Paul Connor

Thomas "Tom" Kerrigan, played by Philip McGinley, is the cousin of Liam (Rob James-Collier), Paul (Sean Gallagher) and Michelle Connor (Kym Marsh). He returns to Coronation Street in June 2008, having previously being seen at Liam's stag party in February that year. On his return, he flirts with Carla (Alison King), Paul's widow, much to her fiancé, Tony Gordon's (Gray O'Brien) dislike. On 23 March 2009, it was revealed that Tom had been axed from the show.

Tom makes friends with gay character Sean Tully (Antony Cotton). On 3 September 2008, Sean mistakenly thinks Tom is gay and when Tom tells Sean that he is straight, Sean leaves in a huff. This leads to Sean's partner, Marcus Dent (Charlie Condou), punching Tom after he suspects that he has slept with Sean.

In September 2008, Tom and Liam go into business together, selling men's shirts, called 'Lad Rags'. Unable to get a loan from the bank, Tom turns to Carla who gives him the £50,000 that he needs, on the condition that she can have a 25% share in the business. This angers Liam initially but he eventually accepts the partnership. He insists, however, that Carla's 25% comes out of Tom's share of the business. Tom is devastated when Liam is killed by a hit-and-run driver in October 2008. Weeks after his death, Tom is confronted by Liam's wife Maria (Samia Ghadie) about Carla's involvement in 'Lad Rags' and he is forced to admit that Carla had invested money in the business. On 3 December 2008, at Tony and Carla's wedding, Tom and Michelle discover Liam and Carla's affair as Sally Webster (Sally Dynevor) reveals it to Maria. This infuriates her and she is about to confront Carla, but she and her new husband, Tony, have already left for their honeymoon. Tom is confused as to Maria's repeated allegations and tries his best to convince her that he knew of no affair. When Maria begins to believe Tony killed Liam, Tom tries to convince her of Tony's innocence, despite his own initial suspicions on the night of Liam's death.

In March 2009, Maria receives Carla's 25% share of 'Lad Rags' making Tom a minority shareholder to her combined 75%. Around this time, he begins to have feelings for her and is not happy when she seeks financial advice from Tony about the business. Tony warns Tom to keep out of it, saying that he knows about his crush on Maria. This infuriates Tom and as revenge, he reveals to Tony's new business partner Luke Strong (Craig Kelly) that Tony is having him followed by a private investigator. Tom leaves the Street in April, following a big argument with Maria and Tony. He is last seen kissing Kelly Crabtree (Tupele Dorgu) outside the Rovers on her birthday, leaving Tony and Maria inside.

== Dylan Wilson ==
Dylan Wilson
- Coronation Street character
- Portrayed by: Charlie Corry (2008); Connor McCheyne (2011–2012); Liam McCheyne (2011–present)
- Duration: 2008, 2011–2012, 2020–present
- First appearance: Episode 6759; 22 February 2008
- Introduced by: Steve Frost (2008); Phil Collinson (2011); Iain MacLeod (2020, 2022)
In-universe information
- Father: Sean Tully
- Mother: Violet Wilson
- Aunts: Lauren Wilson

Dylan Wilson is the son of established characters Violet Wilson (Jenny Platt) and Sean Tully (Antony Cotton) and first appeared on 22 February 2008, having been delivered by Sean and his partner Marcus Dent (Charlie Condou) in the Rovers. He was four weeks premature.

Violet and her boyfriend Jamie Baldwin (Rupert Hill) intended for Dylan to be born in London as they planned to escape Weatherfield because of what they saw as Sean's obsession. Sean immediately bonded with Dylan, and said that when he was born, he looked straight at him and was lost for words at the fact he was the first person Dylan saw. Jamie also bonded with Dylan, although found it hard due to the fact that Sean was his biological father and present at the birth.

Dylan was named by Violet and Jamie. They wanted a name that would go with Wilson and Baldwin. His middle name is "James" after Jamie. Sean suggested changing his last name to "Wilson-Tully" and asked if they would name him as Dylan's father on his birth certificate – Violet and Jamie didn't refuse, making Sean hope they would agree. Dylan left the Street with Violet and Jamie. They decided to put Jamie on the birth certificate, rather than Sean, so Jamie could be his legal father, and so their start in London would be easier for all of them.

Two years later, Sean decided to get back into contact with Dylan and posing as Liz McDonald (Beverley Callard) on a social networking site, added Violet as a friend and saw updated photos of Dylan. However, he was found out when Sean asked her how she'd feel if she had Dylan stolen from her. Violet phoned Liz angrily and Sean's deception was uncovered. Liz sacked Sean, but forgave him as she knew how much he wanted to get in contact with Dylan and told Violet. Violet later added Sean as a friend and allowed him to have contact with Dylan.

In 2011, over the Easter period, Sean went to visit Dylan, where he also reunited with Marcus, who was also in contact with Violet. Violet was going through a rough patch with Jamie, so Marcus and Sean took Dylan out for the day. When they returned, Jamie had gone after breaking up with Violet. Violet made a homophobic remark against Sean when he offered to look after Dylan and he later left. A couple of months later, Violet was injured in a car accident and Dylan stayed with Sean and Marcus. During his stay, Sean wanted to make Dylan a star by auditioning him for a Freshco advert, although the producers wanted Marcus to be with Dylan. In September 2011, Dylan returned to Violet after she recovered, although Sean still has contact with him, and went to visit him over Christmas. Dylan came to stay with Sean again in April 2012, then later in the year for the Christmas period. In July 2016, Sean made plans to see Dylan and introduce him to his boyfriend Billy Mayhew (Daniel Brocklebank). However, before Sean and Billy were to set off to London, Billy broke off with Sean. Regardless, Sean left to go on his own. In October 2020, Dylan came to stay with Sean in Weatherfield.

In late 2023, Dylan and Liam Connor Jr (Charlie Wrenshall) befriend a boy at Weatherfield High called Mason Radcliffe (Luca Toolan). However after a while, Mason turns against Liam and begins to bully him with a reluctant Dylan joining in. One day, Mason threatens Liam with a knife and later has Dylan hide it for him.

In January 2024, Mason steals Liam's phone and says to meet him at school to get it back. Dylan tries to convince Liam not to meet Mason, but Liam decides it was time to stand up to Mason. Though Mason gives Liam back his phone, he then goads him into fighting Dylan. This is witnessed by the school's deputy headmistress Mrs Crawshaw, who is told by Mason that Liam attacked Dylan unprovoked. This results in Liam being suspended from school. After hearing about what had happened, Sean reports Liam to the police. As the fight was Liam's first offence, the matter is resolved by Liam apologising to Dylan in front of their families and Mrs Crawshaw.

After Liam returns to school following his suspension, Mason destroys a puppet he brought into school whilst Dylan films it. Dylan and Mason are later confronted by Liam's mother Maria Connor (Samia Longchambon) who told them that Liam would be moving schools because of them, which Dylan felt guilty about. Dylan and Mason later encounter Liam's stepfather Gary Windass, who attacks Mason after he threatens Liam before Sean intervenes. Wishing to put an end to accusations of Dylan bullying Liam, Sean has Dylan hand over his phone to him, only to be shocked by the messages Dylan has sent Liam including a homophobic one. Dylan denies being homophobic and claims that the messages were just banter. Dylan is later visited by Mason, who tells him not to tell Mrs Crawshaw about him bullying Liam.

On Dylan's 16th birthday, Sean gives him his present. Dylan guiltily opens the present to find a watch in it. After George Shuttleworth talks about his bullying experience, Dylan decides to apologise to Liam. However before he can, he encounters Mason and claims that Sean wanted him to apologise to Liam. Mason tells Dylan not to speak to Liam and has him leave with him.

In 2025, Dylan befriends Brody Michaelis (Ryan Mulvey) and they begin working for Carl Webster (Jonathan Howard) stealing cars. They both take an interest in Betsy Swain (Sydney Martin) and compete for her attention, but it is Dylan who has sex with her the night before her 18th birthday in September 2025. The next day while driving a stolen car with Brody, Dylan swerves to avoid hitting Betsy and hits Tyrone Dobbs (Alan Halsall) instead, resulting in him being hospitalised with a spinal injury.

For his role as Dylan, Liam McCheyne was longlisted for "Best Young Performer" at the 2024 Inside Soap Awards.

== DC Weller ==
DC Weller
- Coronation Street character
- Portrayed by: Caroline Paterson
- Duration: 2008–2009
- First appearance: 17 March 2008
- Last appearance: 20 May 2009
In-universe information
- Occupation: Police Detective

DC Weller was played by Caroline Paterson. She is the police detective heading the investigating team after David Platt (Jack P. Shepherd) pushes his mother, Gail (Helen Worth), down the stairs of their home in March 2008.

She reappears on 17 December 2008, to question Tony Gordon (Gray O'Brien) over the death of Liam Connor (Rob James-Collier), and again on 26 January 2009, when Liam's widow Maria (Samia Ghadie) runs Tony down with her car. She most recently appeared to talk to Colin Grimshaw (Edward de Souza) about having sex with Paula Carp (Sharon Duce) while she was under age, however, he dies of a heart attack before she can question him.

== Julie Carp ==
Julie Marie Carp (previously Jones), played by Katy Cavanagh, made her first appearance on 25 April 2008. She was originally introduced as a new love interest for Kirk Sutherland (Andrew Whyment), but she was later revealed to be the secret half-sister of established character, Eileen Grimshaw (Sue Cleaver). Other storylines involving Julie include her relationship with Brian Packham (Peter Gunn), standing by Kirsty Soames (Natalie Gumede) when she is accused of domestic violence when she is actually the person abusing Tyrone Dobbs (Alan Halsall) and realising this when Kirsty slaps her, surviving a minibus crash with her factory colleagues and her relationship with Dev Alahan (Jimmi Harkishin). Julie departed Weatherfield on 3 July 2015.

== Ted Page ==
Ted Page
- Coronation Street character
- Portrayed by: Michael Byrne
- Duration: 2008–2010
- First appearance: 28 April 2008
- Last appearance: 29 January 2010
- Introduced by: Steve Frost
In-universe information
- Occupation: Retired
- Daughters: Gail Platt
- Grandsons: Nick Tilsley; David Platt
- Granddaughters: Sarah Platt
- Grandfathers: Augustus Page
- Grandmothers: Fanny Page
- Other relatives: Bethany Platt; Billy Platt; Lily Platt; Harry Platt; Sam Blakeman

Ted Page, played by Michael Byrne, is the long-lost father of Gail Platt (Helen Worth), and made his first appearance on 28 April 2008. A week after his arrival, Ted reveals that he is gay, and has recently lost his partner of twenty years. In January 2021, it was announced that Ted would be killed off off-screen and his partner Andrew would break the news to Gail via telephone.

Gail's mother Audrey Roberts (Sue Nicholls) had a relationship with Ted, who was a soldier at the time, in the hope that he would propose and she would get her son, Stephen (Todd Boyce), back. She lost her nerve and never told Ted that she was pregnant. It is only when Ted gets in touch again that she tells him he is the father of her daughter. Ted is distressed when he realises how much he has missed, that he has grandchildren and great-grandchildren. Ted meets Gail and they bond almost instantly.

Ted supports his grandson David (Jack P. Shepherd) when he has a job interview, writing a false reference in Audrey's name. He befriends Ken Barlow (William Roache), offering him a spare ticket for a play. This leads to Blanche Hunt (Maggie Jones) suspecting that Ken is gay. Ted supports Audrey following her car accident and breakup with Bill Webster (Peter Armitage) in 2008. Ted leaves in autumn 2008 but returns on 28 January 2009, following a visit to London. Upon his return, Ted supports the Platts in their feud against the Windasses and gets drawn into Ken's complex relationship with Martha Fraser.

On 5 June 2009, Ted house-sits for Audrey, while she and Gail visit Sarah (Tina O'Brien) in Milan, and meets David's enemy, Gary Windass (Mikey North) who is burgling the house after being set up by David. Ted confronts Gary and chases after him; the police and an ambulance are called but Ted refuses to go to hospital. He later returns to the Street and confronts Gary's parents, Eddie (Steve Huison) and Anna (Debbie Rush). That evening, Ted has a heart attack, caused by a delayed reaction to the earlier exertion. He has surgery and identifies Gary as the burglar. David admits everything, making Ted ashamed of him. An apologetic Gary tells Ted that David set him up and that he had not meant anyone to get hurt. Ted shakes Gary's hand and forgives him. He subsequently becomes good friends with the Windasses and forgives David.

In November 2009, Gary makes an insulting remark about the armed forces when he sees Ted wearing a poppy for Remembrance Day. Ted and Peter Barlow (Chris Gascoyne), who had served in the Royal Navy, tell Gary to show some respect. The next day, Gary apologises to Ted and asks about his days of service. Ted's stories of his army years inspire Gary to join the army himself.

Ted reappears on 7 January 2010, the day before Gail's wedding to Joe McIntyre (Reece Dinsdale) and meets Nick Tilsley (Ben Price), for the first time. Joe, who is in debt, cons Ted into lending him £4,000. The following day, Ted gives Gail away as she marries Joe. Ted made his final on-screen appearance on 29 January 2010, when he requested Joe pay back the money he had loaned him by the following week.

Five months later, Gail rang Ted to inform him that she had been acquitted of Joe's murder.

On 5 February 2021, Gail received a phone call informing her of Ted's death.

== Paul Connor Jr. ==
Paul Connor Jr.
- Coronation Street character
- Appears on: 30 April 2008
In-universe information
- Father: Liam Connor
- Mother: Maria Connor
- Brothers: Liam Connor Jr.
- Grandfathers: Barry Connor; Eric Sutherland
- Grandmothers: Helen Connor; Dot Sutherland
- Uncles: Kirk Sutherland; Paul Connor
- Aunts: Michelle Connor
- First cousins: Ali Neeson; Ryan Connor (adoptive)
- Other relatives: Carla Connor

Paul Connor Jr. was the stillborn son of Liam (Rob James-Collier) and Maria Connor (Samia Ghadie) born on 30 April 2008. He was named after his late uncle Paul, who died ten months before.

Maria had not felt the baby move, told Sean Tully's (Antony Cotton) boyfriend, Marcus Dent (Charlie Condou), and went for an emergency scan on 28 April; the baby was dead. Maria did not tell Liam, thinking that he would marry her because of the pregnancy, and went to stay with her friend/boss Audrey Roberts (Sue Nicholls). Liam found out that Maria had lost the baby when a midwife visited, wanting to check on Maria. He and Maria separated briefly, holding the baby's funeral on 9 May 2008; Liam carried Paul's tiny coffin. Liam and Maria subsequently reconciled although he had a one-night stand with Carla Connor (Alison King). Liam died in October 2008 when Maria was six weeks pregnant. Paul's brother, Liam Connor Jr., was born on 1 July 2009.

== Ann McIntyre ==
Ann McIntyre
- Coronation Street character
- Portrayed by: Susan Mitchell (2008); Lorraine Hodgson (2014)
- Duration: 2008, 2014
- First appearance: 14 May 2008
- Last appearance: 23 June 2014
- Introduced by: Steve Frost (2008); Stuart Blackburn (2014)
In-universe information
- Husband: Joe McIntyre (backstory)
- Daughters: Tina McIntyre

Ann McIntyre (previously called Anna) is the estranged mother of Tina McIntyre (Michelle Keegan). Originally named "Anna" and played by actress Susan Mitchell, she appears in a single episode in May 2008. Anna appears after receiving a telephone call from Gail Platt (Helen Worth), telling her that Tina is okay after moving into the Platts' house earlier on in the week. Fuming at the innocent call, Anna storms round to the house, demanding to see Tina, and does not hold back in letting her know her feelings on the matter. An argument ensues as Anna calls Gail's son and Tina's boyfriend David Platt (Jack P. Shepherd) a criminal, to which Tina responds by revealing that she was pregnant with his child but had an abortion. As the argument escalates, Gail intervenes and throws Anna out.

In June 2014, now called "Ann" and played by actress Lorraine Hodgson, she returns following Tina's death. Ann meets up with Tina's friend and former employer, Rita Sullivan (Barbara Knox), in the café. She admits to growing estranged from Tina and only communicating with her by telephone occasionally. Rita expresses her condolences and Ann reveals that Tina spoke highly of her. Ann later goes for a drink in the Rovers, where Tina had worked; along with Rita and her ex-husband Dennis Tanner (Philip Lowrie). Ann reminisces about Tina's birth, telling Rita and Dennis that she had been in labour with her for 22 hours and that she had promised to always look out for her. Whilst they are there, Ann is approached by Rob Donovan (Marc Baylis), who unbeknown to her is Tina's killer. Rob expresses his condolences and offers to support Ann and help with the funeral arrangements. Rita then assures Ann that Tina was popular and well-liked in the local area.

The next day, Ann meets up with Dennis, Rita and David, in the Rovers and asks about Tina's relationship with Rob. Rita and David explain that they had flirted with each other a few months previously. Ann also reveals that she has chosen readings and written a eulogy for the funeral and David offers to pick music for the service, that Tina would have liked as Ann didn't know what her daughter liked. Ann also suggests handing out bookmarks and keyrings to the mourners, but Rita discourages her, telling Ann that it was not "very Tina". As Ann is about to leave, she bumps into Rob's sister Carla Connor (Alison King), the wife of Peter Barlow; whom Tina had been having an affair with. A drunk Carla berates Tina in front of Ann, telling her that she blames Tina for her miscarriage that she had suffered the previous week, and the breakdown of her marriage to Peter. She also reveals that she had liked Tina, prior to finding out about the affair, and drunkenly asks Ann why Tina did what she did, and has to be led away by Rovers landlady Liz McDonald (Beverley Callard). Ann then leaves, bumping into Rob as he arrives at the pub to check on Carla, on her way out. The following week, Ann visits Rita in The Kabin and gives her some flowers to thank her for her support. She also asks Rita to read a eulogy at Tina's funeral. Rita is reluctant at first but Ann tells her that she knew Tina better than she did and she agrees to do it.

Ann is next seen at Tina's funeral. Following the service, Ann goes with Gail to the grave of her ex-husband Joe (Reece Dinsdale) and remarks that Tina would have been pleased to be buried near her father. Ann also reveals that Tina was always closer to her father than she was to her when she was a child. Rob also approaches Ann and apologises for Tina's death. Ann then wonders what type of person Tina's killer is to have done what they did to her; making Rob feel guilty. She apologises for her outburst and a tearful Rob asks for her forgiveness but when Ann asks what for, Rob says for not be able to change what happened, saying he wished he could. Ann is disgusted when Peter Barlow (Chris Gascoyne), who Tina had been having an affair with, causes a drunken scene and makes a remark which suggests that Rob is guilty of the murder. Later at Tina's wake in the Rovers, Ann has drinks with Rita, Dennis and Norris Cole (Malcolm Hebden) and angrily asks how Peter had the nerve to show his face at the funeral and believes that he is Tina's killer. When Peter's stepmother Deirdre Barlow (Anne Kirkbride) hears the news and defends Peter, Ann asks her to leave the pub and not ruin the wake as the funeral had already been ruined. Rita, Dennis and Norris reassure Ann again that Tina would not be forgotten and reminisce about her again. This is Ann's last appearance.

== Clarissa Mason ==
Clarissa Mason
- Coronation Street character
- Portrayed by: Alexandra Boyd
- First appearance: 19 May 2008
- Last appearance: 24 September 2008
In-universe information
- Husband: Harry Mason

Clarissa Mason, played by Alexandra Boyd, first appeared in May 2008 as Harry Mason's (Jack Ellis) estranged wife. He refused to help her, as she had just told him that she had lost her drivers license due to speeding, so she left. She returned on 23 May, when Harry hired Lloyd Mullaney (Craig Charles) to drive her around for a while. She returned to the street on 2 July, to cause some more trouble for Harry. She later began to expect more from Lloyd, and even insisted on him buying her a drink in the Rovers Return on 11 July 2008. On 23 July 2008, Clarissa agreed on a divorce settlement. Clarissa reacted when Harry struck up a close friendship with Liz McDonald (Beverley Callard), but Harry tried to reassure Clarissa that nothing was going on between him and Liz. On 28 July 2008, Clarissa caught Harry and Liz at his house, kissing and expressing feelings for each other. She decided that she wanted Harry back, and he ended his relationship with Liz. On 30 July 2008, Clarissa offered a reluctant Harry chance to move back in with her, and told him to cancel their divorce. Later that day, she ended up in a brawl with Liz, after Liz threw Clarissa out of the Rovers Return, after Clarissa offended Liz about looking old, and then threw her drink over her. She was only allowed back into the Rovers after she apologised.

Clarissa and Harry reappeared on the street in September 2008 just as Harry and Liz resumed their fling, soon developing into an affair. When Clarissa discovered the truth from Liz, they both teamed up to exact their revenge on the philandering bookie. Liz invited Harry into the back room of the Rovers with the promise of sex, as she stripped Harry to his underwear Clarissa entered the room with her camera phone and took the incriminating photos of Harry. He soon left the street and the ownership of the bookies to his son Dan.

== Kenzie Judd ==
Kenzie Judd
- Coronation Street character
- Portrayed by: Jack Cooper
- Duration: 2008–2009
- First appearance: 26 May 2008
- Last appearance: 3 April 2009

Kenzie Judd is played by Jack Cooper and first appeared on 26 May 2008. Kenzie is the main member of the gang of hoodies that terrorised the street. He also raided The Kabin and left Norris Cole (Malcolm Hebden) shaken, he also robbed Roy's Rolls. They also caused Jerry Morton (Michael Starke) to suffer a heart attack. This persuaded Jerry's daughter, Kayleigh (Jessica Barden) not to be with him, and he lost his part in his schoolplay, which went to schoolmate Chesney (Sam Aston), who also has an eye for Kayleigh. Kenzie later appeared on the Street with the other hoodies on 22 August 2008 to beat Chesney, but the fight was broken up by their ex schoolteacher John Stape (Graeme Hawley).

He returned on 3 April 2009, when he and his gang attacked Chesney, only to be stopped by Chesney's sister, Fiz Brown (Jennie McAlpine) who was about to punch him, until the intervention of the headmaster, Mr. Griffin (Roger Morlidge).

== Jimmy Dockerson ==
Jimmy Dockerson
- Coronation Street character
- Portrayed by: Robert Beck
- Duration: 2008–2009
- First appearance: 11 July 2008
- Last appearance: 23 October 2009
In-universe information
- Occupation: Mechanic/Henchman

James "Jimmy" Dockerson is played by actor Robert Beck. The character first appeared on 11 July 2008, as a henchman of Tony Gordon, sabotaging the clients of Kevin Webster (Michael Le Vell). Several months later, Jimmy reappears when Tony discovers that his fiancée Carla Connor (Alison King) has had an affair with her former brother-in-law Liam (Rob James-Collier). Tony arranges a hit-and-run incident to kill Liam, hiring Jimmy to carry it out on Tony's stag night on 17 October. On 22 December 2008, he meets up with Tony where he tells him not to call him again. A few days later, after Tony attempts to murder Jed Stone (Kenneth Cope), he calls to ask for Jimmy's help but he hangs up on him. In early February 2009, Carla meets with Jimmy, where he tells her of his hired henchman activities and what really happened on the night of Liam's death.

Jimmy returns on 22 October 2009 when Tony hires him to kill Carla after she threatens to expose the truth. However, Tony later has a change of heart and tries to contact Jimmy to call it off, to no avail. After Jimmy has a vicious scuffle with Carla, after gaining entry into her apartment, she strikes him over the head with a candlestick knocking him unconscious, and Tony tricks Carla into thinking that he is dead. She then promptly leaves for Los Angeles again not knowing that Jimmy is still alive.

In November 2009, Tony hands himself into the police, and gives Jimmy's name as the hitman that he hired to kill Liam. The police then begin searching for Jimmy. Tony, meanwhile, confesses to Carla that he had only pretended Jimmy was dead in order to get her to leave and protect himself. In early December, the police tell Carla that Jimmy has been arrested and has confessed to killing Liam and told them of Carla's attack on him.

== Pam Hobsworth ==
Pam Hobsworth is played by Kate Anthony. She made her first appearance on 16 July 2008 as the Aunt of established character Molly Dobbs (Vicky Binns). She appeared as a regular from July 2008 to April 2010, and then reappeared later that year. She reappears in late 2011, and is present at the memorial service for the tram crash victims and again in April and May 2012.

== Prem Mandal ==
Prem Mandal
- Coronation Street character
- Portrayed by: Madhav Sharma
- First appearance: 18 July 2008
- Last appearance: 14 November 2008
In-universe information
- Occupation: Businessman
- Brothers: Govinder Mandal; Sanjeet Mandal
- Wife: Nina Mandal (1979–2008); Mrs. Mandal (2009–present)
- Daughters: Tara Mandal

Prem Mandal, played by Madhav Sharma, first appeared upon meeting Dev Alahan (Jimmi Harkishin) and Vernon Tomlin (Ian Reddington) on a golf course. Prem, who runs a successful floor-covering business, remembered Dev from a Trades association meeting. Prem took Dev under his wing, as he said Dev reminded him of a younger version of himself. Sharma had previously played Dev's father during a 2004 appearance. Dev was invited to dinner with Prem and his wife Nina (Harvey Virdi) on 1 August 2008. Nina then began an affair with Dev behind Prem's back.

In October 2008, he consented to Dev going out with his daughter Tara (Ayesha Dharker) as he saw Dev as a man of integrity and honour. Prem was disgusted when Dev revealed his affair with Nina to him, he forced him out of his house and vowed to have nothing more to do with him, ending his relationship with Tara, but agreed not to tell her why they had to end.

== Nina Mandal ==
Nina Mandal
- Coronation Street character
- Portrayed by: Harvey Virdi
- First appearance: 30 July 2008
- Last appearance: 17 November 2008
In-universe information
- Occupation: Retired actress
- Husband: Prem Mandal (1979–2008)
- Daughters: Tara Mandal

Nina Mandal, played by Harvey Virdi, made her first appearance on 30 July 2008 as the wife of new character Prem Mandal (Madhav Sharma). She began to flirt with Prem's friend Dev Alahan (Jimmi Harkishin), who had idolised her in his youth, as she'd been a Bollywood star. The following day Nina invited Dev to come to dinner with her and Prem. When Nina and Dev were alone, Nina shocked Dev by suggesting they have an affair. After some initial reluctance, he gave in within a few days. Nina then told Dev to book a weekend away for him and Nina. Nina then began to blackmail Dev after he attempted to end their affair. When Dev was introduced to Prem and Nina's daughter Tara (Ayesha Dharker), Nina furiously warned the shopkeeper to keep away from her. Nina later again blackmailed Dev into ending his relationship with Tara, by threatening to reveal their affair to Prem, but Dev instead told Prem about his sordid affair. In November 2008, Nina was devastated when Tara discovered that she had also been having an affair with her ex-boyfriend. Tara refused to have anything to do with her and Nina urged Dev not to tell her about their fling. Dev agreed, but Dev's daughter Amber, who knew about the affair, told Tara out of spite a few days later. When Tara returned to the Street in late December 2008, she told Dev that she and her mother had not been speaking for several weeks.

== Lisa Dalton ==
Lisa Dalton
- Coronation Street character
- Portrayed by: Ruth Alexander Rubin
- Duration: 2008–2009
- First appearance: 1 August 2008
- Last appearance: 17 April 2009

Lisa Dalton arrives on the Street at the beginning of August 2008 as a friend of Prem (Madhav Sharma) and Nina Mandal (Harvey Virdi), when Dev Alahan (Jimmi Harkishin) is invited to dinner with them. Dev and Lisa then begin to date, they meet up shortly after meeting for the first time and they go to the Rovers for a drink. They then decide to stop seeing each other.

Lisa returns on 30 March 2009 shortly after Dev's relationship with Tara Mandal (Ayesha Dharker) begins to fail. She gets drunk with Dev in the Rovers and the pair end up in bed together. On 17 April 2009, barmaid Poppy Morales (Sophiya Haque) tells friend Tara of Lisa and Dev's night of passion and Tara warns Lisa not to visit her or Dev again.

== DC Hooch ==
DC Hooch
- Coronation Street character
- Portrayed by: Dominic Carter
- Duration: 2008–2009
- First appearance: 10 October 2008
- Last appearance: 11 September 2009
In-universe information
- Occupation: Policeman

DC Hooch is a policeman. He is enemies with Becky Granger (Katherine Kelly) and has tried to get her arrested on several occasions. He first accused her of theft, but Becky was found not guilty due to a false alibi from Steve McDonald (Simon Gregson). He reappeared in mid-2009 when it transpired that he had hired Becky's ex, Slug, to try to bring her down. Slug convinced Becky he was a changed man, however, on Hooch's orders, he planted drugs in Becky's bag on her wedding day to Steve. The Rovers was then raided by the police and Becky was arrested.

Steve confronted Hooch who told him that it was payback for the court case in 2008. Steve then instructed his Streetcars drivers to track down Slug. Lloyd Mullaney (Craig Charles) managed to find him and he and Steve bundled him into a car boot and took him to Becky, where he admitted planting the drugs for Hooch. Steve, Lloyd and Becky then met with Hooch and Slug was forced to say he would tell the truth in court and defend Becky. Hooch remained confident, however, soon after, the charges against Becky were dropped.

Hooch met with Steve and told him that he would not bother them again if they stayed out of his way. He also warned Steve that Becky would bring him down. Hooch has not been seen since.

== Anna Windass ==
Anna Windass, played by Debbie Rush, made her first appearance on 14 November 2008 with her partner, Eddie (Steve Huison) and their son, Gary (Mikey North). Storylines involving Anna include her rocky relationship with her boyfriend Eddie, dealing with Gary going into the army, her relationship with Owen Armstrong (Ian Puleston-Davies), adopting Faye Butler (Ellie Leach), being blackmailed into sleeping with Pat Phelan (Connor McIntyre) and coming to terms with Faye's underage pregnancy and looking after the baby Miley when Faye neglects her. A number of weeks before her debut, Anna was originally going to be named "Donna Windass", but was changed last minute.

== Len Windass ==
Len Windass
- Coronation Street character
- Portrayed by: Conor Ryan
- Duration: 2008–2009
- First appearance: 14 November 2008
- Last appearance: 14 August 2009
In-universe information
- Occupation: Criminal (former)
- Brothers: Eddie Windass
- Nephews: Gary Windass

Len Windass, played by Conor Ryan, is the brother of Eddie Windass (Steve Huison) and the uncle of Gary Windass (Mikey North). He made his first appearance on 14 November 2008. Graeme Proctor (Craig Gazey) warns his friend David Platt (Jack P. Shepherd) not to mess with Len and the family as it will lead to trouble after David has been back to the family's house to demand payment for their new kitchen.

Len and Gary menace Joe McIntyre (Reece Dinsdale) out of his tools in retaliation to David's threat against Len's brother, Eddie and his partner Anna (Debbie Rush), in order to recover some money they owe. Len helps the family settle into Number 6 and reappears a month later when Gary asks him to get hold of some copper piping, which they steal from Bill Webster's (Peter Armitage) building yard.

In February 2009, Len is furious when he hears that Gary is being brought to court for starting a violent fight with David. He threatens David's girlfriend Tina McIntyre (Michelle Keegan), warning her not to testify at the trial. He also begins taunting Tina's father Joe, whom he later tries to bribe by offering him a lucrative offer to fit kitchens in a new development on the condition that he will persuade Tina not to testify.

In June 2009, Len gives Gary an alibi when he robs Audrey Roberts' (Sue Nicholls) house and provokes Ted Page (Michael Byrne) to have a heart attack. However, Gary tells his parents the truth and Eddie tells Len that he is no longer welcomed in their home.

Several months later, Len reappears when Joe is thrown off a building job for not being up to it. He then makes a further appearance back on the Street on 14 August 2009, when he, Eddie and Anna deliver a cake to Steve (Simon Gregson) and Becky McDonald's (Katherine Kelly) wedding reception at The Rovers. Len has not appeared since.

Len was mentioned in mid-2010, when Eddie arranged to take the order of a load of cigarettes for Len, who was said to be on holiday at the time. Gary also briefly stayed at Len's empty house when he was AWOL from the army.

In April 2011, Eddie receives a phonecall from Len, offering Eddie a job with him in Germany, much to Anna's annoyance. After Eddie and Anna split up, Eddie leaves Weatherfield and goes to Germany to join Len.

== Minnie Chandra ==
Minnie Chandra
- Coronation Street character
- Portrayed by: Poppy Jhakra
- Duration: 2008–2009
- First appearance: 17 November 2008
- Last appearance: 26 October 2009
In-universe information
- Occupation: Kebab shop worker

Minnie Chandra, played by Poppy Jhakra, first appears on 17 November 2008. Jhakra was added to the soap's cast in a bid to better reflect Manchester's ethnic diversity. She is a college friend of Amber Kalirai and becomes an employee at Prima Doner on Victoria Street. In December 2008, she meets Tyrone Dobbs (Alan Halsall), whilst he is fixing her car at the garage. They begin to flirt and Tyrone sells her knock-off perfume. Molly Compton (Vicky Binns), Tyrone's girlfriend looks on as Tyrone and Minnie go for a test drive, leading her to suspect Tyrone is having an affair.

Minnie reappears in late January 2009. Amber Kalirai (Nikki Patel) has taken on work at her father Dev Alahan's (Jimmi Harkishin) kebab shop, Prima Doner, as well as holding down her job at the corner shop, so she can use the wages Dev would be paying her for driving lessons. Dev brings her to the store, where her job has been taken over by Minnie. Knowing Amber's plan had been foiled, Dev swaps their jobs again, sending Minnie to work at Prima Doner.

In June 2009, Minnie becomes friends with Rosie Webster (Helen Flanagan) after she almost runs her down, and calls her a "trollop". Rosie decides to tell her first about the £150,000 windfall that she has received from John Stape (Graeme Hawley). The pair then go on a major shopping spree and celebrate later in the Rovers with champagne.

In June 2009, Gary Windass (Mikey North) tries to explain to Minnie's co-worker Tina McIntyre (Michelle Keegan) his side of story of the burglary of Audrey Roberts' (Sue Nicholls) home, which he was involved in, but Tina refuses to listen. Jason Grimshaw (Ryan Thomas) then tries to intervene but Gary leaves; Minnie praises Jason for his bravery and asks him out for a drink, to which Jason hesitantly accepts, although he is clearly interested in Tina. Jason gets really drunk when with Minnie and embarrasses himself in front of her. Minnie lets him hug and kiss her neck, but will make clear things will not go any further and leaves the pub.

Minnie is last seen on-screen on 26 October 2009 when she gets Tyrone to give her another driving lesson, angering Molly, now Tyrone's wife and she accuses him of flirting with Minnie. Minnie has not appeared since.

== Pat Gordon ==
Pat Gordon
- Coronation Street character
- Portrayed by: Jamie Lee
- First appearance: 1 December 2008
- Last appearance: 7 December 2008
In-universe information
- Brothers: Tony Gordon
- Half-brothers: Dave Gordon
- Half-sisters: Sarah Gordon
- Uncles: Robert Gordon

Patrick "Pat" Gordon was the brother of Tony Gordon (Gray O'Brien). Pat was first mentioned on 3 October 2008 when Tony asked Liam Connor (Rob James-Collier) to be his best man after claiming that he had fallen out with his brother. However, when Liam was murdered by Tony after he hired Jimmy Dockerson (Robert Beck) to run him over in a deliberate hit-and-run, Tony's fiancée Carla Connor (Alison King) then invited Pat for their wedding. He served as best man to Tony on the day on 3 December 2008. Pat and Tony were on friendly terms, but did not seem overly close, as Pat mentioned to Maria. Pat also tried to tell several wedding guests that he had originally dated Tony's first wife, Lindsey (Susie Amy) but Tony quietened him down. Pat left the day after Tony's wedding, after unwittingly telling Maria that Tony had lied about his reasons for not being at the first wedding, and that Tony would have killed Liam if he'd found out Liam had had an affair with Carla.

Despite his brother being arrested for Liam's murder, and later breaking out of prison and causing a siege at a factory which resulted in his death, Pat never returned to the street. When wreaths arrived at the factory, presumed to be for Tony, Liam's sister Michelle (Kym Marsh) thought Pat had sent them but Maria said it was unlikely as Pat disowned Tony after discovering he had killed Liam.

== Colin Grimshaw ==
Colin Grimshaw
- Coronation Street character
- Portrayed by: Edward de Souza
- Duration: 2008–2009
- First appearance: 12 December 2008
- Last appearance: 20 May 2009
In-universe information
- Father: Arnley Grimshaw
- Daughters: Eileen Grimshaw; Julie Carp
- Grandsons: Jason Grimshaw; Todd Grimshaw
- Other relatives: Elsie Tanner; Dennis Tanner; Linda Cheveski; Billy Platt

Colin Grimshaw was the father of Eileen Grimshaw (Sue Cleaver), the grandfather of Jason Grimshaw and Todd Grimshaw, and has seven other children with his former wife. He was played by Edward de Souza and made his first appearance on 12 December 2008. He was first seen being served by Peter Barlow (Chris Gascoyne) at the bookies. As he was placing a bet, Eileen phoned him, but he lied and said he was on the bus to Weatherfield; as he was known for his betting and drinking. He stopped at the Rovers and was attracted to Rita Sullivan (Barbara Knox). He spoke to Eileen, again lying to her about his whereabouts, but she recognised the pub owner's voice in the background. She marched across the street and handed him his cold dinner, pouring the entire salt canister on top for good measure. Colin followed her home and gave her some flowers Tyrone Dobbs (Alan Halsall) had thrown away (Colin lied to her that he'd paid for them at great expense). Eileen forgave him. Colin continued to give short shrift to his daughter, lying to her on Christmas Day so he could spend the day with Rita. When Rita found out what he'd done, she apologised to Eileen, but Eileen told her it was to be expected.

On 27 April 2009, Colin celebrated his seventieth birthday with his partner Rita, Eileen, his grandson Jason (Ryan Thomas) along with many other friends at a party in the Rovers, organised by Rita. During the celebrations, Colin proposed to Rita and she gladly accepted. However, the party was interrupted by the arrival of Eileen's childhood friend Paula Carp (Sharon Duce) who had recently heard that her daughter Julie (Katy Cavanagh) had slept with Jason. Paula and Julie got into an argument, with Paula urging her to stop seeing Jason. Paula then dropped the bombshell that Julie and Jason were related. When Colin tried to get her to leave the pub, Paula turned on him and revealed the shocking truth that he was Julie's father, having got her mother pregnant when she was just fourteen and he was 38. This meant that Julie and Jason were aunt and nephew, while Eileen was Julie's half-sister.

On 1 May, Colin suffered a stroke while visiting Eileen, and she refused to go with him to the hospital. On 11 May, Colin discharged himself from hospital, and Jason and Julie looked after him at Eileen's. She vowed never to speak to her father again and did not want him in the house but relented due to his frail state. The police arrived to question him over historic accusations of child abuse after Paula reported him to the police, but he collapsed and died instantly from a heart attack whilst in Eileen's living room.

== Jesse Chadwick ==
Jesse Chadwick
- Coronation Street character
- Portrayed by: John Thomson
- Duration: 2008–2010, 2024
- First appearance: Episode 6967; 15 December 2008
- Last appearance: Episode 11451; 25 December 2024
- Introduced by: Kim Crowther (2010); Verity MacLeod (2024)
In-universe information
- Other names: General Custard
- Occupation: Children's entertainer
- Wife: Shirley Chadwick (backstory); Jayne Chadwick (until 2024); Gail Rodwell (2024–present)
- Stepsons: Nick Tilsley; David Platt
- Stepdaughters: Sarah Platt

Jesse Chadwick was played by comedian and actor John Thomson. It was announced on 2 September 2008 that John Thomson would be joining the cast of Coronation Street as children's entertainer Jesse, filming three episodes with producers hoping for a permanent return in 2009. A spokesman said: 'We are delighted that John is joining the show. John is a fantastic comedy actor and is perfect for the part of Jesse'. It was reported on 16 February 2010, on Digital Spy, that Thomson would be leaving his Coronation Street role following two stints on the show later in the year. His final appearance came the following month. On 19 August 2024, it was announced that Thomson would be reprising the role of Chadwick. He returned on 9 October 2024 and departed on the 25 December 2024 with his new wife Gail Chadwick (Helen Worth).

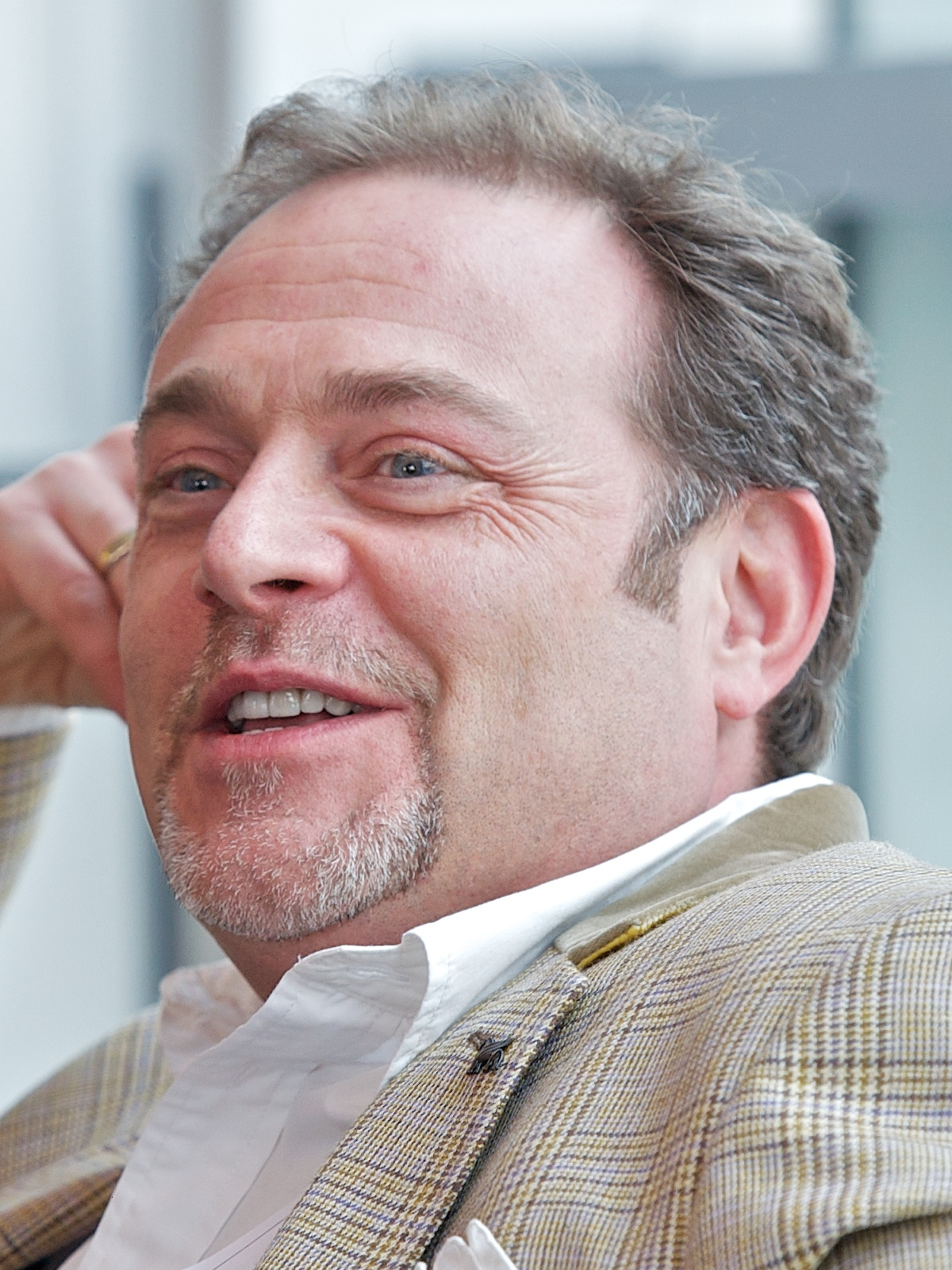
Thomson who portrayed Jesse.

Steve McDonald (Simon Gregson) books Jesse, a children's entertainer, in character as General Custard, for his daughter Amy's Christmas party but he turns up saying that his wife has left him and he can not go through with it. Steve persuades his friend and colleague, Eileen Grimshaw (Sue Cleaver), to step in and play Hia-Lowa, General Custard's sidekick and Jesse agrees to go ahead with the party. Amy's Christmas party takes place. Eileen and Jesse do a great job. Jesse leaves the street but returns in the summer of 2009 when Eileen drags Amy to see General Custard at the Community Centre. Although initially awkward, Eileen and Jesse swap mobile numbers. Jesse turns up in the Rovers Return pub looking for Eileen. She's thrilled to see him and introduces him to her son Jason and her lodger Sean. Jesse begins a relationship with Eileen. However, Eileen is at first put off by Jesse's strict mother. Jesse soon moves in with Eileen, bringing his parrot, John with him.

In late 2009, Jesse auditions for a new sidekick for his act, eventually hiring Julie Carp (Katy Cavanagh), Eileen's half-sister, although Eileen forbids it when she realises that Jesse is attracted to Julie. Jesse and Julie continue with the act in secret. Eileen eventually becomes suspicious and asks Eddie Windass (Steve Huison) to watch Jesse for her. Eddie soon sees Julie getting into Jesse's van and informs Eileen, who forces Jesse to sack Julie as his assistant, which Jesse reluctantly does.

On Christmas Eve 2009, Jesse takes part in The Rovers Return panto, playing the role of one of the Ugly Sisters along with Sean Tully (Antony Cotton). In February 2010, Jesse has a big win on the horses and Eileen is sure that he will take her on holiday. However, when Jesse announces that he is using the money to take his parents to Egypt, Eileen dumps him and Jesse leaves the house. He returns to the Street the following month begging for Eileen's forgiveness and tries to get Julie to put in a good word for him. Julie is stunned when he later makes a pass at her. Julie informs Eileen of Jesse's actions and the two sisters chase Jesse out of the Street after humiliating him in The Rovers.

=== Return ===
On 19 August 2024, it was announced that Thomson would be reprising his role as Chadwick as part of Gail Rodwell's (Helen Worth) exit storyline after Sean Wilson announced he had quit his role of Martin Platt, who was initially meant to return for Gail's departure. An ITV spokesperson reported to Digital Spy: "Sean Wilson has stepped down from filming for personal reasons". As a result, storylines had to be changed drastically. Many speculations have been made regarding how Chadwick will fit in with Gail leaving The Cobbles, but executive producer, Iain MacLeod has confirmed that Gail won't be killed off: "Gail won't die. It didn't feel like killing her off would be right. Gail's exit is a brilliant story. I thought, 'What do the viewers want to see?'. Gail has had a hard life. She had a difficult childhood and she disastrous marriages. So, we though what viewers really want is a happy ending for her, so that's what we're doing."

On 29 September 2024, Thomson addressed his return to Coronation Street. He revealed in an interview that Jesse is heading back to Weatherfield to see Gail following the news of her granddaughter Bethany Platt's (Lucy Fallon) botched cosmetic surgery procedure. A change from his last stint in the soap when he was in a relationship with Gail's long-time enemy, Eileen. He explained: "Jesse is not really prepared to see Eileen after things ended so badly between them. When Jesse left, he'd been spreading his bets over two sisters, which is slightly morally bankrupt to say the least. He's changed dramatically because he's very remorseful for that behaviour, so for him to think that Eileen would even contemplate having him back after he made a play for her sister is not on his radar. I don't think the new Jesse could possibly entertain that there would ever be anything with Eileen again because of his actions in the past." He continued: "Jesse met Gail in Thailand. He's heard about Bethany and he's very worried. So on his travels he's returned via Weatherfield to check on Gail, because they've stayed in touch via email. He's heard all about Bethany and he's very concerned for Gail.

When Thomson was asked what Platts make of this, he laughed: "So two like him and two hate him! Shona and Nick are prepared to give him the benefit of the doubt, whereas David and Sarah are absolutely not – it's just total mistrust from the start. There is the thinking that they need a decent man in their lives, but as soon as David lists all Gail's previous, it's no wonder that there is a mistrust because Gail's sense of judgement over men has been very poor. Really Shona and Nick are very generous in their offer to wipe the slate clean and see what Jesse might be like given Gail's history. Jesse's going to have to work really hard to get David and Sarah on his side and see he is just a friend who cares about Gail, because there's a real sense of mistrust about his motives." He continued: "I was a bit shell shocked when I first came in because I'd forgotten the speed of the turnaround so it was an absolute baptism of fire. But everyone in the Platts has made me feel so welcome. I just feel secure and proper looked after. Helen [Worth, who plays Gail] and I are absolutely thrilled to be working together, everyone's good company and there's always fun to be had on set with the Platts, which is great. It was a bit like crank handle starting a car after all these years but the laughs have got us through. Ben [Price, who plays Nick] said to me: 'You do know we're all always word perfect, don't you?' I thought 'Oh no' but thank God he was winding me up. My ability to learn lines at speed is getting better and better again so it's not as daunting as it was. And I'm sharing a dressing room with Joe [Duttine, who plays Tim] which is great, he's a really good guy, we get on really well and we're both the same – juggling childcare and getting on with the job."

== Poppy Morales ==
Poppy Morales
- Coronation Street character
- Portrayed by: Sophiya Haque
- Duration: 2008–2009
- First appearance: 17 December 2008
- Last appearance: 8 June 2009
In-universe information
- Occupation: Barmaid

Poppy Morales, played by Sophiya Haque, appears on 17 December 2008. She arrives at The Rovers Return Inn with friend Liz McDonald (Beverley Callard), whom she has met in a Brazilian Crunch exercise class. Poppy catches Liz's attention as she is a well-known barmaid. She is the 51st Rovers barmaid, she is offered 'Assistant Manager' which she accepts, following Michelle Connor (Kym Marsh) hinting at not wanting extra shifts. Poppy also offers to take on Betty Williams' (Betty Driver) shifts while she visits her son Gordon Clegg (Bill Kenwright) and his family in Wimbledon over the Christmas period. At Christmas when Tony Gordon (Gray O'Brien) and Carla Connor (Alison King) are kissing in The Rovers, Poppy jokingly grabbed Lloyd Mullaney (Craig Charles) to show what a "real kiss" was like, unknowingly annoying Liz, who has feelings for Lloyd.

In March 2009, Poppy is disgusted when she witnesses Dev Alahan (Jimmi Harkishin) leaving The Rovers with Lisa Dalton (Ruth Alexander Rubin), as it is clear that they are going to sleep together. She is stunned the following day when Dev comes into the pub with his girlfriend Tara (Ayesha Dharker) who is oblivious to his infidelity. In order not to see her friend get hurt, Poppy tells Tara about Dev and Lisa's night of passion. Poppy is given the sack from The Rovers in June 2009, after she fires long-serving Betty. Betty complains to Steve and he tries to get Poppy to reconsider. Poppy then verbally attacks Steve and his girlfriend Becky Granger (Katherine Kelly) which leads to Becky dragging her out of The Rovers by her hair. Poppy was never seen again.

== Mike Scott ==
Mike Scott
- Coronation Street character
- Portrayed by: Anthony Bessick
- Duration: 2008–2009
- First appearance: 29 December 2008
- Last appearance: 30 January 2009
- Crossover appearances: Harry Hill's TV Burp (2009)
In-universe information
- Wife: Laura Scott (until 2009)

Michael "Mike" Scott, played by Anthony Bessick, first appeared on 29 December 2008, when Janice Battersby (Vicky Entwistle) was forced to do community service at the local hospital. One day she went for a smoke break and met Mike. He told her he was in for a chest infection, downgraded from pneumonia. She told him about her community service, and they laughed over their shared misfortune. Janice then went back to work, but that night her friends told her she'd been beaming the whole time she'd been out with them, which suggested that she still had Mike on her mind.

He reappeared on 30 January 2009, when Janice met up with him again, they chatted together, though Mike keeled over and collapsed. When Janice tried to get help, Mike asked her to stay with him. Janice screamed for help, with other people in the car park alerting doctors at the hospital. Some time after he was taken inside, a nurse told Janice that Mike had died. The doctors said that he had a clot on his lung. Janice learned Mike had been much more ill than he'd let on to her, and had just had major surgery some days prior to his death. She later learned he had a wife when she received flowers and a card, and Emily Bishop (Eileen Derbyshire) told her how grateful his wife had been that someone was with him after his collapse. Mike's death shook Janice deeply and she considered becoming a nurse.

Anthony Bessick made two appearances in character on Harry Hill's TV Burp, lampooning the way his character died on screen.

== Others ==
Character	Date(s)	Actor	Circumstances
Nurse	30 May; 3 June 2011	Paula Williamson	A nurse who cared for Jerry Morton (Michael Starke) at the hospital after he was admitted following a heart attack. She appeared again in 2011 when Fiz Stape (Jennie McAlpine) was hit by a van in pursuit of her husband John (Graeme Hawley).
Chav mum	3 September	Hayley Elliott	This young and heavily pregnant mother refused to thank Roy Cropper (David Neilson) for saving her son from a busy road. She was put in her place by Roy's close friend Becky Granger (Katherine Kelly), who told her that if she can not seem to be a good enough mother, she should forego any more children.
Saj	19 – 22 September	Sanade Khan	Rosie Webster's (Helen Flanagan) boyfriend, who she begins dating while on holiday. In the latter episode, they come out of a nightclub and kiss while John Stape (Graeme Hawley) spies on them, and she is later kidnapped by John that night. Saj is not seen again after the incident.
