= Luke Strong (Coronation Street) =

Fictional character from Coronation Street

- Coronation Street character
- Portrayed by: Craig Kelly
- First appearance: Episode 7016; 20 February 2009
- Last appearance: Episode 7187; 19 October 2009
- Introduced by: Kim Crowther
In-universe information
- Occupation: Businessman

Luke Strong is a fictional character from the British ITV soap opera Coronation Street. Portrayed by Craig Kelly, the character appeared throughout 2009. Luke took over Carla Connor's (Alison King) share of the Underworld factory with Tony Gordon (Gray O'Brien). He knew Carla's deceased husband, Paul Connor (Sean Gallagher).

== Creation ==
=== Background ===
Information about the character first surfaced at the end of 2008 when it was revealed he had been created as a new boss of the underworld factory, to replace character Carla Connor, while the actress went on maternity leave. Speaking of the character and plans for him a spokesperson for the soap opera said: "It looks like Tony may have met his match in Luke Strong. He’s a bit of a mystery man and Tony doesn't know what his motives are for buying into the business or how he knows Carla. Luke is certainly going to make things difficult for Mr Gordon." Later background information of the character was revealed and what links the character had to other character within the show. This was that Luke went to Secondary School with the character of Carla in September 1986 to June 1991. In his teenage years he romanced her and they became good friends and he became friends with Carla's boyfriend and future husband Paul. Luke then lost contact with Carla after she and Paul married in 1999 and started to run his own business.

=== Casting ===
For the part of Luke Strong, no auditions were held. Instead actor Craig Kelly was offered the role. Kelly himself revealed during an interview how the part came about saying: "It literally started with a phone call from the producers and it went from there. If any other soap had called, I'd have probably said 'no'. Because it was Corrie and the breakdown of the character was so fantastic, I just thought to myself 'why not?!' I met the team and was offered the part. I instinctively knew that this was for me. Even though it's a big step and a change of direction for me, it's still acting and I'm still getting paid for what I love doing. It's all exciting and quite surreal, especially when you walk onto the Street for the first time. I've never played a character that's as similar to me as Luke is, before...They've been very varied character roles and it's rare that such a fun role as Luke comes up." At the time he was also asked if the character already had certain traits, with Kelly saying: "They started to write for me after the casting, so that's the exciting thing - if I choose to give him some quirks or a tick, the writers will work with that." Of first scenes he said: "Within my first two weeks, I was given 19 scenes, but by the end of it, I realised that on screen, it'll probably be about seven days of Luke's life. You've got to be patient when you're trying to build a character in soap - it's tiny, tiny steps."

On 18 June 2009, it was announced actor Craig Kelly would quit his role, after less than a year. He then departed the show on 19 October 2009.

== Development ==
=== Personality and identity ===
Of his character actor Craig Kelly said during an interview with media website Digital Spy: "Luke is a likeable character who's got ambition and has achieved success through his wit, charm and instinct. He dresses well and likes a laugh and a flirt with the girls, but can handle himself well. He's not a guy who wants to go to war with someone, but if push comes to shove, he'll have it. Really, he just wants to do well in his life. He sees his life as a bit of an adventure. I like to call him a well-rounded entrepreneur who has his thumbs in a lot of different pies." Going on to add: "He has a great, infectious energy - so much so that I did say to Kim Crowther 'you're not going to turn him into a psycho, are you?' She said 'no', so I was pleased! Sometimes in soap, characters can be too good to be true, so I think it's time for a hero to waltz in and give the bad guy a run for his money."

In a later interview with the website he said: "He's an opportunist. He's a bit of a dark horse... But I think he's going to start to open up a bit more now and show his cheekier side."

== Storylines ==
Luke arrives in Weatherfield on 20 February 2009 replacing Carla Connor (Alison King) as the manager of Underworld. He initially infuriates Tony Gordon (Gray O'Brien) after refusing to say where Carla was claiming that all he had told her was that the business needed running. He makes friends with Tom Kerrigan (Philip McGinley) and Maria Connor (Samia Smith) after hearing the story about Liam Connor's (Rob James-Collier) death. After hearing about their business 'LadRags' he expresses an interest in buying it from them for £50,000 each. Tom and Maria, however, state that they need more time to consider the matter.

On 30 March 2009, Peter Barlow (Chris Gascoyne) accidentally drops a lit cigarette while drunk and falls asleep as his flat began to catch fire, Deirdre Barlow (Anne Kirkbride) receives a call from Peter's six-year-old son Simon (Alex Bain) telling her that the flat is on fire. She runs out of the house and tells Luke and Tony as they rush into the house and call an ambulance. Luke gets Simon out while saying he should get Simon's pet rabbit out but Tony keeps repeating that he should leave it. In the end Tony gets Peter out, while Luke goes back in to rescue the rabbit.

Luke goes on have a brief fling with Michelle Connor (Kym Marsh) before she leaves to go on tour with her band. He then turns his attentions to Underworld P.A. Rosie Webster (Helen Flanagan) when she receives a windfall of £150,000 from John Stape (Graeme Hawley). He seduces her and afterwards convinces her to invest in a 9% share of the factory much to her delight. Upon Michelle's return to the Street, Luke's head is once again turned as he dumps Rosie for Michelle. However, he soon gives into Rosie's charms again as the pair sleep together. Rosie tricks Luke, when she takes his phone and texts Michelle pretending to be Luke. Michelle is disgusted when she comes to Luke's apartment only to see Rosie there. Michelle storms out, quickly followed by Rosie, telling Luke that he is dumped.

In October 2009, Luke receives a call from Carla to say that she is coming back to reclaim her shares. Knowing that he has no options left, he quickly turns to Rosie and her money. He lies to her saying that he wants to invest in another company, and that he would like if she bought his shares in Underworld (that were in fact Carla's all along) for £90,000. The idea of being a majority shareholder in the factory is very appealing for Rosie as she falls for Luke's deceit. She agrees, and transfers the money into Luke's bank account on 19 October 2009, meanwhile, Luke makes his getaway as he drives out of Weatherfield, destined for Rio de Janeiro. It is too late for Rosie before she realises that she has been conned, as the bank inform her that it is too late to stop the transfer.

== Reception ==
Actor Craig Kelly stated that his main fanbase is women in their 70s and 80s. Upon the announcement that Craig Kelly was to quit his role, Kris Green of Digital Spy said that the character's departure was the most frustrating news of the week, noted him as one of the most promising characters from the show in years, noted Craig Kelly's 'amazing' performance, but that he was quite disappointed that time had been invested in a character that was essentially built up as the key alpha male of the Street.
