= Tara Mandal =

Fictional character from Coronation Street

- Coronation Street character
- Portrayed by: Ayesha Dharker
- Duration: 2008–2009
- First appearance: 15 September 2008
- Last appearance: 11 May 2009
In-universe information
- Occupation: Art museum owner
- Father: Prem Mandal
- Mother: Nina Mandal
- Aunts and uncles: Govinder Mandal; Sanjeet Mandal

Tara Mandal is a fictional character from the British soap opera Coronation Street, played by Ayesha Dharker. She made her first appearance as Tara during the episode broadcast on 15 September 2008. Tara is introduced as the daughter of Prem Mandal (Madhav Sharma) and Nina Mandal (Harvey Virdi). She was also created as a new love interest of Dev Alahan (Jimmi Harkishin), which writers had already complicated by featuring Dev and Nina in a sexual affair. Tara was only originally supposed to feature in the series until Dev and Nina's affair is exposed. Producers asked Dharker to extend her contract and writers fully developed their relationship.

Tara's other stories include her friendship with Dev's daughter, Amber Kalirai (Nikki Patel). Dharker believed that writers invested in their dynamic because the two actresses had built a good rapport off-screen. In April 2009, it was announced that Dharker would leave Coronation Street as Tara's storyline reached a natural conclusion. Her departure features Tara discovering Dev's affair with Lisa Dalton (Ruth Alexander Rubin) and her subsequent revenge plot. Tara tricks Dev into posing for nude photographs and uses them to create an art installation which she publicly unveils and humiliates him in front of his neighbours. Tara decides to leave Weatherfield following the plot and Dharker last appeared during the episode broadcast on 11 May 2009.

== Development ==
=== Casting and introduction ===
The character and Ayesha Dharker's casting details were publicised on 22 August 2008. Kris Green from Digital Spy reported that Tara was being introduced as the daughter of Prem Mandal (Madhav Sharma) and Nina Mandal (Harvey Virdi). She was also created as a new love interest of Dev Alahan (Jimmi Harkishin), who would romance both Tara and Nina. Dharker's casting followed criticism in a report by chairman of the Equality and Human Rights Commissioner Trevor Phillips, who accused Coronation Street of being "too white". The report noted the show's tokenism in having existing Asian character Dev playing a stereotypical role of a shopkeeper.

Prior to Tara's arrival, Dev had been featured in an affair storyline with her mother, Nina. Dev realises that Nina is using him and ends their romance. Dev meets Tara and realises she is different to Nina and their attraction develops. A show publicist told an Inside Soap reporter that "there's undeniably a massive attraction" and Nina is "furious" about it. They added that "Tara is everything Dev wants in a lady" unlike Nina who is "cold, hard and mean spirited". Tara is introduced into the series during the episode broadcast on 15 September 2008. It features Tara arriving at Prem's dinner party, where she is introduced to Dev. They get along well and begin flirting, which Nina witnesses. She is annoyed by their chemistry and warns Dev that she will reveal their affair. Dev ignores her threats, believing that Nina is bluffing because revealing their affair would ruin her marriage with Prem. Nina's threats continue and leave Dev feeling stressed. He invites Tara back to his home for food but when they arrive they catch his daughter, Amber Kalirai (Nikki Patel) and Darryl Morton (Jonathan Dixon) about to have sex. Dev reacts angrily and violently throws Darryl out of his home. The incident leaves Tara questioning Dev's behaviour.

Script-writers portrayed an on/off relationship between Tara and Dev in her initial months. Dev breaks-up with Tara when Prem finds out about his affair with Nina. The writers also depicted Tara as "relentless" in pursuing romance with Dev. Dharker admired her character's confidence, revealing to a Daily Mirror reporter that "I like the fact that Tara is flirtatious, because in real life I am the opposite." Tara was originally only supposed to feature in the series until Nina found out about Tara's relationship with Dev. Producers decided to expand the role and kept Dharker in the series for further stories. Dharker believed that she and Harkishin had "this weird screen chemistry which is really nice" and writers picked up on it and expanded it into a full relationship. When Tara continues to pursue Dev and kisses him, he rethinks his decision and decides to ask Prem for permission to date his daughter. Prem is annoyed with Dev but eventually listens and agrees to support their relationship.

Other stories explored Tara's dynamic with Dev's daughter, Amber. When Dev buys the kebab shop from the Mortons, it strains her relationship with Darryl. Amber gains revenge by exposing Dev's affair with Nina. Amber makes amends by setting Tara and Dev up on a date. Helen Childs from Inside Soap revealed that Tara and Dev would reconcile from the date. The story begins as Tara informs Dev she is moving to Edinburgh after arguing with her parents. Childs added that Dev would concoct a plan to keep Tara in Weatherfield and offers her accommodation in the flat above his shop. Tara accepts and later joins him for a New Years Eve drink, where they resume their romance. Tara later thanks Amber for helping repair their relationship by buying her a new car. Tara and Amber form a close bond, which Dharker credited to her own good rapport with Patel, which "found it's [sic] way into the script."

In March 2009, writers continued to explore Dev's unfaithful ways when he has sex with Lisa Dalton (Ruth Alexander Rubin). Following an argument with Tara, Dev and Lisa have sex at his house. Tara then visits Dev to apologise, unaware that Lisa is in his bedroom. Kris Green from Digital Spy reported that Dev would be "guilt-ridden" over his deceit. Dharker revealed that it takes Tara "a while to realise" that Dev has cheated on her. She explained that compared to Tara, she has quicker instincts.

=== Revenge plot and departure ===
On 29 April 2009, it was announced that Tara was being written out of the series and it was reported that Tara was never planned to be a permanent character. Writers planned Tara's departure story to be "on a grand scale". Of her departure, Dharker stated "I've enjoyed playing Tara because she's different to me." An ITV publicist revealed "the character was only ever in for that long as the storyline was written with a beginning, middle and end. Ayesha knew that."

In her final story, Tara decides to take revenge on Dev for his affair with Lisa. Tara discovers his affair after overhearing a conversation in the local pub. She convinces Dev to pose nude for professional photographs and then asks him for £9000 to fund a public art installation. Of Tara's revenge plan, Dharker told Green that "I think it's one of those awful things where you're so mad at someone that you don't really know what to do, so you kind of make it up as you go along." Dharker believed that Tara initially uses the photography session as a ruse to get Dev to admit to his affair. Tara gives Dev numerous chances to tell the truth, but his reluctance makes Tara crave revenge and "she goes for the total humiliation option." Dharker felt guilty when filming the scenes because she realised that Tara's behaviour was cruel. She described Dev's behaviour as idiocy but Tara's as "premeditated and totally aimed at making him feel like an idiot."

Tara hangs a large painting of a naked Dev down the side of his apartment exterior, with the word "liar" covering his manhood. She unveils the painting, just as Dev gets on one knee to propose to her. Dev is humiliated and drags Tara inside demanding an explanation. Tara is unwilling to listen and collects her belongings and leaves Weatherfield. Dharker told Green that "I don't think it dawns on her what a hugely damaging thing it is that she's doing until it's too late... It's absolutely heartbreaking." A show publicist told Brian Roberts from Daily Mirror that Harkishin had been a "great sport" posing naked for the storyline. They added it became "one of the funniest things we've filmed". The scenes formed Tara's departure from the series. Dharker defended her character as "not a cold-hearted woman" and it was obvious Tara loves Dev. Dharker believed that Tara realises the consequences of her actions when it is too late. Tara "has a deep affection for Amber" and her behaviour hurts Amber too, which makes her realise she has done a "hugely damaging thing". She concluded that she found it "really interesting" that Tara was given a "big exit" and called it "bit of a surprise actually." Dharker later revealed that she used to think negatively of "commercial entertainment" such as Coronation Street. However, she "liked" working on the show, adding, "if you're going to do a soap, that's the one to do."

== Storylines ==
Tara meets Dev Alahan (Jimmi Harkishin) at a dinner party thrown by her parents Prem (Madhav Sharma) and Nina (Harvey Virdi). Several weeks later, she visits Dev's apartment to discuss business matters on her father's behalf. It is evident that there was an attraction between the pair. They are interrupted by a jealous Nina who warns Dev to stay away from her daughter. After Nina leaves, Tara tries to kiss Dev but he rejects her, leaving Tara embarrassed.

Tara invites Dev to her house after asking for Prem's consent to the relationship. The two are about to share a kiss when Prem and Nina walk in. Dev is forced to end his relationship with Tara after he admits to Prem that he had been sleeping with Nina, as Prem and Dev agreed that Tara would not know of the affair. However, Tara reconciles with Dev and they resume their relationship. Tara later discovers that her ex-boyfriend had been having a fling with her mother while they were together. Further heartbreak follows when Dev's daughter Amber Kalirai (Nikki Patel) exposes Dev and Nina's affair, which results in the end of their relationship.

Amber sets Dev and Tara up on a date in the Rovers Return Inn, Amber tells Tara she has relationship problems with Darryl Morton (Jonathan Dixon) and that she wants advice, whilst telling Dev she wants a drink. Dev sells Tara the corner shop flat, as it is empty and Tara needs accommodation. She gladly accepts. Tara gives Amber a car as a belated birthday present. However, Dev is against this. Amber is offered a job by Darryl, so she can pay for driving lessons.

Dev refits one of his shops as a new art gallery for Tara and she launches it with the name No Oil Painting. Dev's uncle Umed Alahan (Harish Patel) voices concern that Tara is taking advantage of Dev's money and even suspects her of having a fling with Jason Grimshaw (Ryan Thomas), who is working on the refit. Tara begins to be dismayed when it becomes apparent that there is little interest in her new venture as nobody is buying her painting. Keen to please her, Dev has Minnie Chandra (Poppy Jhakra) to pose as a London art dealer who is interested in purchasing some work. Tara discovers Dev that has purchased the art after Minnie brings the art into the shop and she leaves, humiliated that Dev had made a fool of her. After her departure, Dev has a one-night stand with old flame Lisa. To Dev's horror, Tara returns to the flat the following day to say how sorry she was, not knowing that Lisa was in the bedroom. Dev and Lisa's night of passion is revealed to Tara by Poppy Morales (Sophiya Haque). Tara, disgusted, plans her revenge, tricking Dev into posing naked at a photoshoot. Tara unveils to the whole of Weatherfield the nude picture of Dev with the word 'LIAR' censoring him. Dev, who planned to propose to her that same day, argues with Tara in the flat before she packs her bags and leaves. Tara attempts to apologise to Amber, whom she is very fond of, but Amber refuses to listen.

== Reception ==
Patrick McLennan from What's on TV branded her "scheming Tara". Of her departure he added "given what she does to Dev, maybe leaving Weatherfield behind isn't such a bad thing. Digital Spy's Green described Tara's departure scenes as a "jaw-dropping moment" and a "cruel and publicly humiliating revenge" plot. Green also branded her Dev's "besotted girlfriend" and she "humiliated" him "to the highest degree". Katie Fitzpatrick Manchester Evening News included Tara in a list of 10 women Dev has "dated and bedded" and assessed that "their relationship came to a typically humiliating end". She also included Tara in a list of "Dev's dating disasters". Brian Roberts from Daily Record branded Tara's revenge as "hilarious scenes". Writing for Daily Mirror, Roberts described Tara as the "scorned girlfriend" and that she "hilariously exposed" Dev as "a bare-faced love cheat." Another Mirror reporter branded her as a "unlucky in love" character who suffered the "ultimate humiliation" when Dev had sex with Lisa.
