= Sophiya Haque =

English actress, singer, video jockey and dancer (1971–2013)

- Born: Syeda Sophia Haque; 14 June 1971; Portsmouth, Hampshire, England
- Died: 17 January 2013 (aged 41); London, England
- Occupations: Actress, singer, video jockey, dancer
- Years active: 1988–2013
- Height: 5 ft 7 in (1.70 m)
- Partner: David White

Sophiya Haque (14 June 1971 – 17 January 2013) was an English actress, singer, video jockey and dancer. She is best known for playing the role of Poppy Morales in Coronation Street between 2008 and 2009.

== Early life ==
Haque was born Syeda Sophia Haque in Portsmouth, Hampshire to a Bangladeshi father and a British Jewish mother. She was the youngest of three daughters.

She was brought up by her mother, Thelma, a schoolteacher. She attended Priory School in Portsmouth, and took dancing lessons from the age of two and a half at Mary Forrester's Rainbow School of Dance before moving at the age of 13 to London (where she lived with her father, Amirul Haque, a restaurateur, and his second wife), training full-time at the Arts Educational Schools, London.

== Career ==
Haque started as the lead vocalist in the band Akasa; they signed a deal with Warner Bros. in 1988. Subsequently, she worked as a video jockey for MTV Asia for seven years and Channel V.

Haque was employed as a presenter at STAR TV in Hong Kong in 1992. From 1994, she began appearing on TV in India and in 1997 she moved to Mumbai full-time to work on the Channel V India service. Her first Bollywood film was Khoobsurat, and she later made several more including Mangal Pandey: The Rising.

In 2002, Haque returned to the United Kingdom to star as Rani in Andrew Lloyd Webber's Bombay Dreams. In 2005, she starred as Janoo Rani in the West End theatre musical production of The Far Pavilions. In 2012, she starred as Soraya in Wah! Wah! Girls.

In 2008, she took a small supporting role in the film Wanted. Between December 2008 and June 2009, she played Poppy Morales, the barmaid and assistant manager of the Rovers Return, in Coronation Street and by coincidence, shared her dressing room with Coronation Street's Auntie Pam played by actress Kate Anthony, who was also her first cousin.

In 2012, she appeared in BBC's Fairy Tales series and in 15 episodes of House of Anubis as Senkhara. She was diagnosed with cancer when she was working in the Michael Grandage production of Privates on Parade, playing the role of, Sylvia Morgan, a Welsh-Indian singer and dancer performing for the British troops in Malaya in 1948.

== Personal life and death ==
Haque lived in Knaphill, Surrey, with her partner, musical director David White, and the couple were in the process of building a houseboat when she fell ill.

Around Christmas 2012, Haque was diagnosed with cancer. She developed a lung clot and pneumonia and in the early hours of 17 January 2013, she died in her sleep in a London hospital, while undergoing tests.

== Filmography ==
=== Film ===
Year	Title	Role	Notes
1999	Khoobsurat	Herself	Special appearance (as Sophia Haque)
2000	Snip!	Tara	
2000	Alai Payuthey	Lead Dancer in song 'September Madham'	Tamil film, special appearance
2000	Har Dil Jo Pyar Karega	Dancer in song 'Aisa Pehli Baar Hua Hai'	
2001	Indian	Herself	(as Sofia Haque)
2002	Haan Maine Bhi Pyaar Kiya	Dancer in Red Saaree opposite Akshay Kumar in song "zindagi ko bina pyaar koi kaise guzare"	
2002	Santosham	Mehbooba Song	Telugu film, 'Mehbooba' Song
2003	Pehli Nazar Ka Pehla Pyaar: Love at First Sight	Dancer	
2003	Sandhya		
2004	Udhaya	Dancer in song 'Thiruvellikeni Rani'	Tamil film, special appearance
2005	The Rising: Ballad of Mangal Pandey		Singer/dancer in song 'Rasiya', Uncredited
2008	Wanted	Puja	
2008	Hari Puttar: A Comedy of Terrors	Anna Singh	(as Sophia Haque)
2013	Jadoo		(final film role)

=== Television ===
Year	Title	Role	Notes
2008	Fur TV	Mrs Slaughter	1 episode: Rent Boys/Hot Pussy
2008	Fairy Tales	Ameera	1 episode: The Empress's New Clothes
2008–2009	Coronation Street	Poppy Morales	60 episodes
2012	House of Anubis	Senkhara	44 episodes

=== Music videos ===
Year	Song	Singer	Album	Role	Notes
1998	"Yuhi Kabhi Mila Karo"	Zubeen Garg	Yuhi Kabhi	Dancer	Uncredited

=== Theatre ===
Year	Title	Role	Theatre
2002	Bombay Dreams	Rani	Apollo Victoria and Shaftesbury Theatre
2005	The Far Pavilions	Kabir Bedi	Apollo Victoria and Shaftesbury Theatre
2012	Wah! Wah! Girls	Soraya	Theatre Royal Stratford East/Peacock Theatre
2012	Privates on Parade	Sylvia Morgan	Noël Coward Theatre London's West End
