= Tony Gordon =

Fictional character from Coronation Street

- Coronation Street character
- Portrayed by: Gray O'Brien
- Duration: 2007–2010
- First appearance: Episode 6642; 16 September 2007
- Last appearance: Episode 7356; 9 June 2010
- Created by: Jonathan Harvey
- Introduced by: Steve Frost
- Book appearances: Coronation Street: The Complete Saga
In-universe information
- Brothers: Pat Gordon
- Wife: Lindsey Gordon (backstory); Carla Connor (2008–2010)

Tony Gordon is a fictional character from the British ITV soap opera Coronation Street, portrayed by Gray O'Brien. The character first appeared on-screen on 16 September 2007. He appeared as a regular character for two years before departing on 11 December 2009 after being imprisoned for the murder of Liam Connor (Rob James-Collier). He returned on 28 May 2010 after managing to break out of prison with the help of his cellmate Robbie Sloan (James Fleet), whom Tony later betrayed by shooting him dead. The character departed once again on 9 June 2010 after being killed off at the conclusion of his storyline. He was a local businessman, disliked by many of Weatherfield's residents for his ruthlessness. His storylines revolved around his business deals, his relationships with Carla Connor (Alison King) and Maria Connor (Samia Longchambon), and the murder of Liam. Tony was named "Bad Boy" of 2009 at the All About Soap Bubble awards, and "Villain of the Year" at The British Soap Awards 2009.

== Creation and casting ==
In August 2007, it was announced that actor Gray O'Brien had been cast as Tony, with The Mirror's Brian Roberts heralding him as the new Coronation Street "heartthrob". O'Brien stated of his casting: "I'm delighted to be joining the cast of Corrie. Tony is a great character and I hope I'll be well received by the viewers. I've had a great time [on River City], but I'm looking forward to the new challenge."

In June 2009, it was reported O'Brien had been asked by producers to return to the show at a later date to complete Tony's storyline. Tony's initial exit aired in November 2009 and O'Brien performed in pantomime before resuming filming in Spring 2010 for the conclusion to the story, which involved the character taking several others hostage in a siege at the factory, before killing himself in an explosion.

== Development ==
In an interview with entertainment website Digital Spy, O'Brien described the dynamics behind his character ahead of the murder storyline, stating: "He does have boundaries - and the boundaries are that he won't be told 'no'. Anything up to that point is good enough. I don't think he's a murderous person. Tony killing Liam is just circumstances. He's come from nothing and has worked his way up. He's a respected businessman and he thinks it's all about fairness - you play with the sword, you die by the sword. He truly believes that everyone has a price. Up until this point, that's his game. His ambition is that he wants to retire in his mid 40s with several million in the bank. But now, something's come up to stop all that- Liam." When interviewed by BBC News O' Brien spoke of the feasible length that his bad-boy character could remain on the show: "Coming in to play the Coronation Street villain has a life span, so I was aware of that. I knew he was going to be villainous, but I think it was all based on audience reaction that they liked him and the writers just went with it. So it's been a really organic process, I don't think I expected this to happen, quite as it has happened. I've got great faith in the writers at Coronation Street and entrust that they'll keep the momentum with the character going. He's a great character to play and he's popular so I do trust whichever way it ends will be the correct ending." ITV publicity describe him as liking having power and making a lot of money but hating the competition that goes with it.

== Storylines ==
=== Backstory ===
Prior to arriving in Weatherfield, Tony was born in Glasgow in 1971, followed by his younger brother Patrick. His father had a heart attack aged 39. Tony had witnessed this but did not phone an ambulance as he felt his mother was better off without him. His grandfather had also died at age 42 from a heart attack. In 1998, Tony marries Lindsay (Susie Amy), who later has an affair with his brother, Patrick. Tony is a womaniser and only cares about money and mostly himself. He had run a business known as "Gordons Catalogues", and is also a property developer. In 2006, Tony and Lindsay divorce, although she believes that he will eventually come back to her.

=== 2007–2010 ===
Tony arrives in Coronation Street in September 2007 as the owner of a clothing firm, giving a contract to Carla Connor (Alison King) and Liam Connor's (Rob James-Collier) lingerie factory Underworld. He becomes unpopular with local residents for commissioning a new housing development in the area, destroying a bat roost in the process, much to the anger of bat enthusiast Roy Cropper (David Neilson). Planning to expand the Underworld factory, Tony attempts to convince shopkeeper Rita Sullivan (Barbara Knox) and mechanic Kevin Webster (Michael Le Vell) to sell their properties to him. When Kevin refuses, Tony enlists his friend Jimmy Dockerson (Robert Beck) to sabotage his business and persuades Kevin's daughter, Rosie Webster, to give him the garage accounts. He also bullies elderly resident Jed Stone (Kenneth Cope) out of his home, wanting to redevelop the site.

Tony begins a relationship with Carla, unaware she has romantic feelings for Liam. She breaks up with him in order to prove her feelings to Liam, but they later reconcile, becoming engaged. However, Rosie is aware of Carla and Liam's feelings for each other and tries to seduce Tony, but he makes it clear that he is not interested; so she shows him footage of Carla and Liam kissing the morning after their one-night stand. In revenge, he hires Jimmy as a hitman to kill Liam, running him over on Tony's stag night. A distraught Carla briefly leaves the country; but marries Tony upon her return. Upon discovery of Carla's affair with Liam, his widow Maria (Samia Ghadie) begins to suspect Tony's involvement in his death. She confides in Jed Stone, who threatens to go to the police. Tony strangles Jed and initially believes him to be dead. He plans to dispose of his body, initially concealing his body inside a clothing container in Underworld, but is shocked to discover that Jed is in fact, still alive when the staff return and hear him shouting for help. He offers him a new flat in Wigan and £3,000 as hush money to leave Weatherfield and keep quiet. Maria begins a vendetta against Tony but he attempts to depict Maria as mentally unstable, raising Carla's suspicions in the process. When Carla eventually confronts Tony and demands the truth, she tells Tony that she loved Liam more than him, and Tony admits to having him killed. Carla escapes and flees to Los Angeles. Tony has a short-lived relationship with hairdresser Natasha Blakeman (Rachel Leskovac). Maria begins to soften towards Tony when she finds him at Liam's grave. They become friends, and Tony supports her during her pregnancy and delivers her son, who she names Liam Anthony; his forename in honour of his late father and middle name as a tribute to Tony. Liam's parents disapprove of the developing relationship, leading Tony to threaten that if they do not leave Maria alone, they will never see their grandson again. Eventually, the relationship becomes romantic and Maria and Tony become engaged. Carla returns to Weatherfield, and instructs Tony to sell his shares in Underworld to her and leave the country; or she will tell the police what he did. Tony hires Jimmy to kill her but changes his mind at the last moment. Carla escapes from Jimmy by knocking him unconscious but Tony makes her think she has murdered him, leading them to call a temporary truce. Carla then leaves the country yet again.

While Maria visits her parents in Cyprus, Tony suffers a heart attack. He is taken to hospital by Roy, with whom he had previously clashed over the new housing development and confesses Liam's murder to him. He tries to buy Roy's silence but it doesn't work so he begins threatening him. Roy and his wife Hayley (Julie Hesmondhalgh) report him to the police and Roy decides to go bat spotting at the canal. When Maria comes looking for answers, Hayley tells her everything, unaware Tony is hiding behind the café counter with a knife. This upsets Tony even more and he goes to the canal and tries to kill Roy, but Tony's mobile phone rings alerting Roy of his presence, so he pushes Roy in the water due to him being unable to swim but has a change of heart, rescues him and confesses everything to the police. On 11 December 2009, Carla visits Tony in prison where he admits that Jimmy is still alive. He asks her if she thinks Maria will forgive him and she tells him that she never would and that he would be going to hell on his own, before leaving.

Tony reappears in May 2010, as he plots his escape from prison with the help of cellmate Robbie Sloan (James Fleet). Tony feigns a heart attack after initiating a riot at the prison and is quickly taken to hospital by ambulance. Robbie runs the ambulance off the road and frees Tony and they head for Weatherfield on a motorbike. Together, they plan to take Carla and Hayley prisoner in the factory. Robbie tricks Carla into entering the factory with him alone, holds her at gunpoint and then leaves her tied to a chair and gagged with duct tape while he lures Hayley to the factory too. Tony appears announces his intention to kill them, double-crosses Robbie by revealing that he never intended to pay him the full amount that he promised and, after tricking Robbie into giving him his gun, shoots him dead. Maria gets caught in the siege after she goes into the factory and Tony holds her prisoner too. However, he lets her go and she goes to the pub and tells everyone that Tony is holding Carla and Hayley hostage. Becky McDonald (Katherine Kelly), Gary Windass (Mikey North) and Steve McDonald (Simon Gregson), amongst others, arrive outside the factory to try and help. Becky attempts to break the door down with a large pole. Tony later releases Hayley after Carla pleads with him, pushing her out of the door and causing her to fall over before setting fire to Underworld, after dousing the floor of the premises with petrol, determined that he and Carla would die together. However, Carla manages to untie herself and, after a violent struggle, manages to escape, shooting Tony in the process. Tony walks into view, looks out of the open factory doors at the crowd watching from the street and then deliberately walks back into the fire. The factory explodes and Tony is killed. His and Robbie's bodies are removed from the building the following day.

== Reception ==
In March 2009, at the All About Soap Bubble awards, the character won the trophy for 'Bad Boy'. Two months later at the British Soap Awards Gray won 'Villain of the Year'.

Tony, who is a fan of Celtic, dislikes their rivals Rangers. In one episode he remarks: "I could no more fancy Rosie Webster (Helen Flanagan) than I could support Glasgow Rangers". Supporters of Rangers took offence to this remark and flooded the ITV switchboard with calls of protest as they thought the remark was a retaliation for the 2008 UEFA Cup final riots involving Rangers fans. Ironically, it was revealed that his brother has a season ticket for the club. He also once said he was a modern Robert the Bruce – fighting for his honour in the street and the business world. The Scottish Tourist Board claimed that this remark lead to a 4% increase in the historical figure from tourists.

Gareth McLean of the Radio Times has described Tony as "the sort of man who would steal your teeth and come back for your gums" and commented that his friendship with Maria Connor softened his character. In an advance press screening of the Liam Connor murder episodes, soaps editor for Digital Spy Kris Green applauded Gray O' Brien for his portrayal of Tony by saying that both he and co-star Alison King "steal the show."

== See also ==
- List of soap opera villains
