= Philip McGinley =

English actor

- Born: Philip Kiaran McGinley; 6 June 1981 (age 45); Liverpool, England
- Education: Oxford School of Drama; Arts Educational Schools, London (2003)
- Occupation: Actor

Philip Kiaran McGinley (born 6 June 1981) is an English actor, best known for playing Anguy the Archer in Season 3 of HBO's Game of Thrones.

== Early life ==
He was born in Liverpool and grew up in Golborne, near Wigan. He attended All Saints Primary School, Golborne High School, Winstanley Sixth Form College, the Oxford School of Drama, and the Arts Educational Schools in London, graduating in 2003. Philip attended Willpower Youth Theatre in Wigan for many years until he left to go to drama school.

== Selected stage and screen credits ==
=== Theatre ===
- The Changeling with Cheek by Jowl, directed by Declan Donnellan
- Great Expectations with the Royal Shakespeare Company
- Kes with the Royal Exchange, Manchester.
- Young Tom in Canary at the Liverpool Playhouse
- Waldorf in Straight at the Studio Theatre (Sheffield)
- Jesus in the York Mystery Plays 2016

=== Television ===
- BBC – Dalziel and Pascoe, The Deputy, Hawking, Father Brown; Battlefield Britain, Casualty, and The Gemma Factor
- ITV – Coronation Street, Cold Blood, Blue Murder, Falling, Heartbeat, Vera, The Bill and This Morning (Self)
- Channel 4 - Mark in Drifters, Bob Simmons in No Offence
- HBO – Anguy in Game of Thrones
