= Gray O'Brien =

Scottish actor (born 1968)

- Born: Gerard O'Brien; 11 August 1968 (age 58); Glasgow, Scotland
- Education: Royal Conservatoire of Scotland
- Occupation: Actor
- Years active: 1993–present
- Children: 1

Gray O'Brien (born Gerard O'Brien; 11 August 1968) is a Scottish television and film actor, best known for his portrayal of the villainous Weatherfield businessman Tony Gordon in the ITV soap opera Coronation Street from 2007 to 2010, and as Richard McCaig on the BBC medical drama Casualty from 1996 to 1998.

== Biography ==
O'Brien was born in Glasgow, the second youngest of seven children, and is a graduate of the Royal Scottish Academy of Music and Drama. Resident for a time in Cumbernauld, he has appeared in many television productions, including Taggart, Peak Practice, River City (as serial womaniser Billy Davis), and the 2007 Doctor Who Christmas special, "Voyage of the Damned". He played Prince Charles' valet in the 2006 motion picture The Queen.

O'Brien joined the cast of Coronation Street as the murderous factory boss Tony Gordon in September 2007. The actor explained in an interview that he uses sense-memory technique, drawing on "something dark from the past", to emote his powerful performances. Asked about female reaction to his character's on-screen conspiracy to murder love rival Liam Connor, played by pin-up Rob James-Collier, O'Brien joked: "I'm sure most viewers believe that it's just a story." O'Brien won Villain of the Year for the role at the 2009 British Soap Awards.

The Manchester show drew the ire of football fans when, in October 2008, several months after the 2008 UEFA Cup final riots, in a scripted line, O'Brien's evil character made a jibe about Rangers F.C. Complaints led to a similar line being cut from the script of a later episode. Professing surprise at the outcry, the star said: "I'm a Celtic supporter but I need to be clear that I certainly wasn't going out of my way to antagonise any Rangers supporters."

In May 2009, Coronation Street producers announced that O'Brien's contract with the show had been extended to 2010. Gray left Coronation Street when his character was killed off at the end of a storyline, in which Tony Gordon held Hayley Cropper (Julie Hesmondhalgh) and Carla Connor (Alison King) hostage in the Underworld factory, which he sets ablaze, although his prisoners manage to escape alive.

He played Abanazar in the pantomime Aladdin at the Opera House, Manchester from 5 December 2009 to 3 January 2010. Between 4 December 2010 and 16 January 2011, he played the role again at the Theatre Royal, Nottingham.

O'Brien was judged Scotland's eleventh most eligible man in February 2009 by a Scotland on Sunday panel. He once said: "I actually find the heartthrob thing laughable," adding: "I am just a jobbing actor from Scotland and I don't think of myself as particularly good looking."

O'Brien has also appeared on Lily Savage's Blankety Blank.

In 2017, he appeared in ITV drama The Loch.

== Personal life ==
O'Brien is divorced from Lynn, whom he married on 9 May 1996. They have a son, Conor (born 2000), who made a cameo appearance in an episode of Coronation Street. O'Brien's late father, Eddie, was also a fan of the long-running TV programme. O'Brien began dating make-up artist Jill Farimond in 2008, but it was reported in April 2009 that the couple had amicably split. His father died of a heart attack. In 2019, O'Brien was diagnosed with stage-4 tonsil cancer; he has since made a full recovery.

== Filmography ==
=== Films ===
Year	Film	Role
2006	The Queen	Charles' Valet
2015	The Daniel Connection	DCI Brian Farrow
2016	The Wasting	Ilyas

=== Television ===
Year	Show	Role	Notes
1993–1995	Taggart	DC Rob Gibson	Recurring; 5 episodes
1996–1998	Casualty	Richard McCaig	Series regular
2000–2002	Peak Practice	Dr. Tom Deneley	Series regular
2002	Cruise of the Gods	Casualty Doctor	
2003–2007	River City	Billy Davis	Series regular
2007–2010	Coronation Street	Tony Gordon	Series regular
2007	Doctor Who	Rickston Slade	1 episode: "Voyage of the Damned"
2012	Titanic: Blood and Steel	Bruce Ismay	12-part series
2017	The Loch	Alan Redford	6-part drama series
2018	Shakespeare & Hathaway: Private Investigators	Ian McClurgy	1 episode: "The Chimes at Midnight"
