= Chesney Brown =

Fictional character from Coronation Street

- Coronation Street character
- Portrayed by: Sam Aston
- Duration: 2003–present
- First appearance: 10 November 2003
- Created by: Chris Parker
- Introduced by: Steve Frost
- Spin-off appearances: Coronation Street: Pantomime (2005); Coronation Street: Out of Africa (2008); Coronation Street: Text Santa Special (2013); What Would Kirk Do? (2014–2015)
In-universe information
- Occupation: Student; Market trader Kebab Shop Manager
- Mother: Cilla Battersby-Brown
- Adoptive father: Les Battersby
- Sisters: Fiz Brown
- Half-brothers: Billy Brown; Greg Kelly (adoptive)
- Wife: Gemma Winter (2023–present)
- Sons: Joseph Brown; Aled Winter-Brown; Bryn Winter-Brown
- Daughters: Carys Winter-Brown; Llio Winter-Brown
- Nieces: Hope Dobbs; Ruby Dobbs (adoptive)

Chesney Brown (also Battersby-Brown and Winter-Brown) is a fictional character from the British ITV soap opera Coronation Street, played by Sam Aston. He made his first on-screen appearance on 10 November 2003. The character is named after the singer, Chesney Hawkes.

Chesney is the younger brother of Fiz Brown (Jennie McAlpine) and son of Cilla Battersby-Brown (Wendi Peters). He is also a father of five and the husband to Gemma Winter (Dolly-Rose Campbell). Chesney's storylines have included: his friendship with his beloved pet dog Schmeichel and coming to terms with losing his beloved pet, as well as his relationship with Katy Armstrong (Georgia May Foote) who later went on to give birth to his son Joseph Brown (Lucca-Owen Warwick) aged just seventeen. Chesney later began a relationship with Sinead Tinker (Katie McGlynn) in 2013 and was stabbed with a glass bottle during an incident at Nick's Bistro in 2017. Within days of the incident, he made a full recovery.

== Creation ==
Sam Aston was chosen to play Chesney after training at a local drama group, Carl Godby's Theatre Workshop. It was revealed by producers that he was named after 1990s icon Chesney Hawkes.

Aston's siblings have also appeared in the show; his sister Emily Aston played Becky Palmer from 1996 to 1997 and his brother Joseph Aston played Tommy Duckworth in 2000.

While his upbringing was not as traumatic as his sister Fiz's (Jennie McAlpine) early years, Chesney was often left home alone and had to put up with the many "uncles" Cilla brought to their flat. Chesney found some stability with Les Battersby (Bruce Jones), but Les abandoned the family after a few years, with his mother Cilla soon following. An increasingly bitter Chesney was left to be taken care of by Fiz, but her relationship problems often overshadowed her duties as his guardian.

== Development ==
In July 2010, it was announced that Chesney would have sex with newcomer Katy Armstrong (Georgia May Foote) in a storyline involving the 17-year-old losing his virginity. A spokesperson for Coronation Street said "We have all seen Chesney grow up so it’s going to be a huge milestone for him and the viewers. We all remember that sweet little kid who first arrived in the Street with his mum Cilla. But that was seven years ago and he’s about to become a man. The storyline will be handled responsibly and the two characters will discuss what contraceptives to use."

In February 2011, it was announced that Katy would be involved in a storyline centered on teenage parenthood. The plot involves Katy suggesting to Chesney that they start a family. Although Chesney is initially shocked and concerned about their young age, he eventually agrees to the proposal, and the couple begins searching for a flat to rent.

The storyline also explores the concerns of Fiz, who opposes the decision due to her own difficult experiences with motherhood. Fiz expresses apprehension that Chesney is too young for the responsibilities of being a father. Despite this opposition, the narrative proceeds with the couple remaining together and eventually welcoming a son named Joseph.

In September 2011, it was revealed that Chesney's dog Schmeichel would be put to sleep in an upcoming storyline. "It will be heartbreaking for Chesney - and for viewers," a Corrie source told The Sunday Mirror. "But bosses think the time is right for Schmeichel to leave the show." In response to complaints about Schmeichel's fate, a Coronation Street spokesperson told The Mirror: "Great Danes do not live forever and the storyline has been decided upon." Speaking to Soaplife, Aston admitted that he will miss scenes alongside the Great Dane. He explained: "Having his beloved dog put to sleep is not an option Chesney is willing to consider. Schmeichel has always been there for him; when Cilla, Les and even Fiz let him down, Schmeichel was always there. Chesney would do anything it takes to help out his faithful pal. He would go thousands of pounds into debt if he has to." Paying tribute to Schmeichel, Aston added: "I will [miss him]; he has been such a massive part of Chesney's character. The first thing people want to know when I'm out and about is where my dog is. He's probably one of the most popular characters on the show. It's horrible because I've grown up with him."

In February 2013, it was announced that former Waterloo Road actress Katie McGlynn has been cast as Sinead Tinker, a relative of established characters Beth (Lisa George) and Craig Tinker (Colson Smith) and as a new love interest for Chesney. A statement on the soap's official website teased: "As Katy struggles to resist the temptation of smooth talking Ryan, Chesney faces a heartbreaking few months. Will new girl Sinead be his light at the end of the tunnel?"

Speaking to Digital Spy, Aston said: "Sinead is a very different character and I think her and Chesney would be quite well-suited." However, Aston also hinted that, despite Chesney starting up a new relationship, he believes his alter ego will always love Katy: "I think Chesney's heart will always belong to Katy! But that might just be my own personal take on it rather than the way the story is going!" Aston also admitted that he helped Katie McGlynn, who will be playing Sinead, find her feet on her first day on set: "I've been showing her around the set. Katie knows what she's doing anyway - she knows how it works because she was on Waterloo Road before this. But she was a bit lost on the first day, so I tried to be as helpful as possible!"

On 28 May 2017, it was reported by The Sun that Chesney would be stabbed in an upcoming storyline with the scenes leaving viewers guessing over whether Chesney manages to survive the brutal assault.

== Storylines ==
Chesney is the younger brother of Fiz Brown (Jennie McAlpine) and son of Cilla Brown (Wendi Peters). Chesney soon bonds with Cilla's boyfriend Les Battersby (Bruce Jones), and also gets on well with Fiz's then-boyfriend Kirk (Andrew Whyment) who is also a lodger with Les and Cilla. In 2004, Rita Sullivan (Barbara Knox) clips Chesney around the ear for repeatedly stealing sweets from her shop; Chesney falls against some shelving, and is slightly hurt. When Cilla learns of the incident, she spots an opportunity for compensation. Chesney is taken to hospital by the Battersby-Browns, with Cilla prompting her son to complain of fake symptoms so that he will be diagnosed with a concussion. Rita is arrested and charged with assaulting a minor, and Cilla coaches Chesney into giving the 'right' answers; Rita is ordered to pay £500 in damages to the family and £500 in court fees. Disappointed with the court payment, Cilla seeks a £3,000 out of court settlement. Rita puts the Kabin on the market and prepares to leave the area, but Les talks Cilla out of any further action. Rita bears no ill will against Chesney, later employing him to do a paper round. Chesney attempts to run away after his mum leaves without him, but Les takes him back in. He receives a pure breed Great Dane dog from the Duckworths, which he names Schmeichel, after the Danish former Manchester United footballer, Peter Schmeichel. He also befriends Sophie Webster (Brooke Vincent). Later that year, Cilla starts to abuse Chesney, such as threatening to hit him if he tells Les about her affairs and also running away with him as she taunts him that no-one loves him. Eventually, Cilla is good to Chesney.

In 2005, he cons several residents at Easter into giving him Easter eggs. That August, Schmeichel is run over by a bus driven by Claire Peacock (Julia Haworth), leaving Chesney devastated, but the dog survives. Chesney accidentally walks in on Sally Webster (Sally Dynevor) when she is in the shower, and Les tells everyone about the incident, threatening his friendship with Sophie. In 2006, is saddened at the news that his mum has cancer, but refuses to go on a holiday with her when he finds out she lied about the seriousness of her condition. In January 2007, when Cilla returns, Chesney begins to feel unwelcome. In May, Les leaves Weatherfield to work as a roadie and has little subsequent contact with Chesney. By October 2007, Cilla also chooses to leave Weatherfield for Las Vegas because she has come into money. Not wanting to take Chesney with her, she gives him £1,000. He spends a third of his money on an Xbox 360, angering Fiz who has been left with nothing. In March 2008, Chesney learns that Les isn't returning, and he is taken to a foster home, because Kirk cannot take care of him properly. Claire later reveals that she reported them to the Social Services, in Chesney's best interests. Chesney is allowed to return home after Fiz agrees to move into Number 5, though with much reluctance, as Kirk, now her ex-boyfriend, is still living there. Later, Chesney is dismayed to see the return of Fiz's ex-boyfriend John Stape (Graeme Hawley), who had cheated on her. John buys Chesney a bike for his birthday which he rejects when he finds out who it has come from. In a fit of rage, Chesney breaks the wing mirror on John's taxi.

On Chesney's fourteenth birthday, he receives a postcard from Cilla and Les. They invite Chesney and Kirk to join them in Sun City, North West. Kirk and Chesney agree to go, but Fiz is dismayed. When they arrive at the airport, they find out that 'Les' is not their Les, but a South African fraudster named Lesedi. Cilla reveals that she had placed their names in a competition to win the "South African sunshine family" award and had got to the final, with a chance to win half a million South African dollars. Cilla pleads with Fiz to join them. Fiz confronts Cilla about her scheme, but Chesney believes Cilla will 'return' to Weatherfield if they win, so Fiz agrees to help. The family gets stuck in a bush and are surrounded by lions, but are saved by Kirk. At the awards ceremony, Chesney reveals that he is not really disabled, and the Battersbys are disqualified. Later, Chesney is horrified to find out that Fiz has been consulting John Stape about his education, and regularly visiting him in prison. This leads to a falling out between the pair, as Chesney is angry that his sister cares more about John than she does him. Chesney later finds out that Fiz and John are engaged and, in a fit of rage, he steals Fiz's engagement ring and crashes Rosie Webster's new car, nearly running over Anna Windass (Debbie Rush) in the process. Chesney relents and attends John and Fiz's wedding.

In 2010, Chesney meets Katy Armstrong (Georgia May Foote), and is instantly attracted to her. Katy's father, Owen Armstrong (Ian Puleston-Davies) does not approve of their relationship, and threatens Chesney. In December 2010, Fiz goes into labour, three months early as a result of the shock of the tram crash. With Chesney's support, Fiz gives birth to a baby girl, and names her Hope. In early-2011, Hope is diagnosed with a heart condition, but is successfully treated. Chesney comforts Fiz when John goes into hospital after a breakdown. In March 2011, when Hope comes home, Fiz tells Chesney he will have to get rid of Schmeichel, so he and Katy move out, and Katy suggests they have a baby of their own. While cooking dinner for Chesney, Katy tells an ecstatic Chesney that she is pregnant with his baby, and they decide to keep her pregnancy a secret. Chesney begins to grow suspicious of John Stape, so goes to see Charlotte Hoyle's (Becky Hindley) parents, who tell him that John (who they believe is Colin) is engaged to Charlotte and makes the decision to switch her life support machine off. He confronts John, who denies any involvement in Charlotte's death, and Joy Fishwick's (Doreen Mantle) suspicious death. John, realising that Chesney is starting to work out the truth, takes him to the Hoyles' house, where he holds them hostage in the cellar; before Chesney runs away, John ties him up too. John tells Katy that Chesney has run away, but Chesney manages to untie himself and the Hoyles a few days later, breaking the bar to which they are tied. Unknown to them, John digs up the body of Colin Fishwick (David Crellin), who he had buried a few months earlier. Chesney escapes after his sister, Fiz, works out the truth about John and follows him to the Hoyles' house; she tells a horrified Chesney that Katy is about to have an abortion, and Chesney arrives just in time to prevent this. The police arrest John, who attacks Maria Connor (Samia Ghadie) while she is looking after Hope. In November 2011, Schmeichel is diagnosed with liver cancer, and the vets say he has no choice but to put Schmeichel to sleep. On 23 December 2011, Chesney finds out from his Fiz, that Katy has gone into labour at the nativity play, so Anna Windass has to deliver the baby. Chesney is stranded in the middle of nowhere with Gary Windass (Mikey North) after they have cut down some Christmas trees to be delivered. After stealing some unlocked bicycles, Chesney manages to make it in time to see the birth of his son, who they name Joseph Peter; Joseph because he was born at the nativity play, and Peter in honour of Schmeichel.

In 2012, Katy begins to struggle with looking after Joseph, and keeps abandoning him. On one occasion, Chesney returns home just after Katy rushes back. After talking things through, Chesney says that Katy is a good mum and should stay. In August, Katy's sister, Izzy (Cherylee Houston), has a miscarriage, so Katy wants to be a surrogate mother. This upsets Chesney, who almost falls out with the Armstrong family. Chesney ends his relationship with Katy when she has an affair with Ryan Connor (Sol Heras). Katy moves in with Ryan, taking Joseph with her. Chesney begins dating Sinead Tinker (Katie McGlynn), but she ends their relationship when she realises that he still loves Katy. Katy leaves Ryan and attempts to reunite with Chesney, but he says he cannot forgive her. Sinead and Chesney resume their relationship. When Fiz moves in with Tyrone, Sinead spends more time in the house with him. Chesney has to give up his market stall when his uninsured stock is stolen, but Dev Alahan gives him the job of manager at his kebab shop. Sinead later moves in with Chesney and they are joined by her Aunt Beth, partner Kirk and her cousin Craig. Shortly afterwards, when Beth attacks a man who was trying to mug her friend from bingo, she receives a £5,000 reward, and takes the family to Mexico for two weeks.

Cilla returns to the street and she tells Chesney and Fiz that she has a serious illness, but leaves when she fails to get Chesney's support. In 2015, Chesney discovers that Sinead has been in a minibus crash with several other residents, including Steve McDonald (Simon Gregson), who was responsible for the accident. Chesney blames Steve for Sinead's injuries, but she slowly recovers in hospital. Chesney finds out that Katy plans to move to Portugal with Joseph, and threatens to seek custody, but Katy reconsiders her options. Feeling guilty, Chesney lets Katy take Joseph to Portugal with her, so that he can have a new, but different life.

In 2017, Katy dies off-screen in a car accident in Portugal, and Chesney flies out there to bring Joseph home to Weatherfield.

In January 2018, Chesney's nerves take the better of him at the altar on his wedding day to Sinead Tinker, and he announces he can't marry her, despite the fact both he, and son Joseph, love her very much. Sinead leaves the wedding, devastated.

Later in the same year, he embarks on relationships with both hairdresser Emma Brooker (Alexandra Mardell), and Prima Doner colleague Gemma Winter (Dolly-Rose Campbell). Despite the fact he only hooks up with Emma to make Gemma jealous, Emma develops genuine feelings for him, and is gutted.

== Reception ==
Sam Aston was chosen to present the Queen with a bouquet of flowers at ITV's 50th anniversary in 2005. The actor has revealed in an interview that since he has joined the show, he seems to not get much attention from girls. He claims that as Chesney is more of a geeky character, women over 65 stop him in the street and offer to look after him. Aston won the nomination for the Best Dramatic Performance from a Young Actor or Actress in 2005. In 2007, he was nominated for Best Young Actor, though Eden Taylor-Draper, who plays Belle Dingle from Emmerdale, won the award. Sam was also nominated for the Best Child Actor in 2008, though yet again did not receive the award. In May 2017, Laura-Jayne Tyler from Inside Soap called Chesney and Sinead's relationship a "snore-fest" and asked Coronation Street to "put us out of our misery" and end their relationship "for the love of all that is good in this world".
