= Charlotte Hoyle =

Fictional character from Coronation Street

- Coronation Street character
- Portrayed by: Becky Hindley
- First appearance: 9 April 2010
- Last appearance: 10 December 2010
- Created by: Kim Crowther
In-universe information
- Occupation: Teacher
- Father: Alan Hoyle
- Mother: Dorothy Hoyle

Charlotte Hoyle is a fictional character from the British ITV soap opera Coronation Street, played by Becky Hindley. The character first appeared on-screen during the episode airing on 9 April 2010 and departed on 10 December 2010 after being murdered by John Stape (Graeme Hawley).

== Development ==
Speaking of Charlotte's popularity, Coronation Street executive producer Phil Collinson commented: "I think that Becky Hindley has done an amazing job. They're always great parts to play, the bunny boilers, and Becky has really embraced that. I think she's just played it brilliantly."

"I think what she's done so brilliantly is make us feel Charlotte's pain. She isn't just a bunny boiler - she's a really lonely, heartbroken person. Colin Fishwick dying in front of her eyes was probably the most perversely exciting thing that's ever happened to her!

"She became desperate to hang onto the drama that came from that night. I think it's been great telly: you take people like John and Fiz - who are really loved characters - and then you do something this extraordinary to them. I think you just want to watch it!"

Actress Becky Hindley had previously appeared in Coronation Street in 2007 as an exam invigilator, invigilating a Geography exam at Weatherfield High. It is possible that these characters could be the same person, as Charlotte Hoyle was known to have been working at the school in the same period of time.

== Storylines ==
Charlotte is seen briefly at Colin Fishwick's (David Crellin) leaving party to Canada in April 2010. Two months later, John Stape (Graeme Hawley) attends an examination marking conference and is horrified to find Charlotte is there. John had previously checked the attendance list to ensure that none of his old colleagues were present but he had only checked by school name, not knowing that Charlotte had left Weatherfield Comprehensive. He initially pretends to be working for the examination board, but when Charlotte notices Colin's name on the same attendance list and is stopped by John from correcting the matter with the organisers, he is forced to confess his deception. Charlotte confesses that she now finds John exciting whereas she previously thought he was boring and insists that he take her for a drink.

John is startled when Charlotte turns up on the Street with the claim that Colin is returning home, but when he questions her further, it transpires that she had only received text messages stating that he was not completely happy in Canada. However, Charlotte makes great play of knowing John's secret, both to him and his wife Fiz (Jennie McAlpine) when she finds them together in The Rovers Return Inn. Fiz demands that John give up his deception and resign from the school. Meanwhile, Charlotte implies that she will only remain silent about the identity theft if John sleeps with her, much to his dismay.

When Colin suddenly returns to Weatherfield, Charlotte helps John to tell Colin what he has been doing in his absence. Charlotte is horrified when Colin suddenly collapses and dies during an argument with her and John. Under pressure from John, she helps him hide Colin's body in the charred remains of the Underworld factory, and when the factory is refurbished, the body is buried under concrete. Charlotte also helps John collect Colin's belongings from his boarding house and burn them. In the subsequent days, Charlotte continues hanging around John for support, claiming she is very worried and scared of the consequences of their actions. Fiz soon becomes suspicious and believes that they are having an affair and storms round to Charlotte's house. Fiz smashes up Charlotte's living room and warns her to stay away from John. Charlotte tells Fiz that John is still teaching, despite telling her he had handed in his notice, Fiz then temporarily leaves John. When John finds out about this, and after Charlotte makes another pass at him, he tells her he finds her repulsive and has no feelings whatsoever for her.

In November 2010, John visits Charlotte again at her new school, suspecting her of sending threatening letters, making silent phonecalls and leaving a C-shaped wreath and flowers outside Underworld for Colin. However, she claims she has been receiving similarly threatening letters and phonecalls and tells John it is affecting her emotional well-being. She once again makes advances on John and he rejects her again. John later discovers that Charlotte is the stalker and has been sending letters to herself. Charlotte blackmails John into pretending they are a couple. She tells him that he has to spend time with her and she starts calling him Colin. Charlotte later introduces John to her parents Alan (John Woodvine/Michael McStay) and Dorothy (Jean Fergusson), and tells them he is her new fiancé.

When Charlotte asks John to leave Fiz, she watches his house and discovers that he is lying to her. She barges in and attempts to attack John with a hammer, and he trips and falls to the floor after snatching the hammer from her. Charlotte tries to leave and go to The Rovers to tell Fiz the truth. John charges at Charlotte and hits her with the hammer, the force sending her crashing into the front door. John checks Charlotte's pulse and discovers that she is bleeding heavily from a wound to her neck. John begins to dial 999, but after hearing an explosion, he runs outside and sees that The Joinery bar has blown up and a tram has careened off the viaduct, and crashed into the street. As Fiz goes into labour, John is worried about someone finding Charlotte's body, so, after Fiz gives birth to a baby girl, John returns to the Street and moves Charlotte's body towards the devastation of the tram crash site by The Joinery. A police officer sees John, who claims that he found Charlotte like this and that he does not know her. The officer checks Charlotte's pulse and reveals that she has a weak pulse and is still alive, much to John's horror. She falls into a coma and is taken to hospital, where John and her parents, Alan and Dorothy, are informed that Charlotte is brain dead. With the consent of John and her parents, the decision is made to switch off her life support machine and, as a result, Charlotte dies.

== Reception ==
Milton Haworth from Great British Life called Charlotte a "bunny boiler" who had a "nasty end at the hands of serial killer John". Katie Fitzpatrick from Manchester Evening News called the character "obsessed".
