= List of Coronation Street characters introduced in 2010 =

The following is a list of characters that first appeared in the ITV soap opera Coronation Street in 2010, by order of first appearance.

== Enid Crump ==
Enid Crump
- Coronation Street character
- Portrayed by: June Broughton
- Appears in: Episode 7266; 4 February 2010
In-universe information
- Occupation: Barmaid

Enid Crump, played by June Broughton, arrives on the Street to confront Betty Williams (Betty Driver) as Betty celebrates her 90th birthday and a reporter writes an article stating that she is the oldest barmaid in the North West. That is until Enid arrives and claims her title to the throne, as she is 91.

After Enid contracts food poisoning, Betty is in great fear as Steve McDonald (Simon Gregson) tells her that the hot pot, which he served her, was found at the back of the fridge, but he did not know that it was two months old. Liz McDonald (Beverley Callard) makes enquiries and finds out that Enid's illness is attributable to drinking too much, much to Betty and Steve's relief. In 2011 Betty finds out in the newspaper that Enid has died of a rare liver disease.

== Jane Kenworthy ==
Jane Kenworthy
- Coronation Street character
- Portrayed by: Annie Fitzmaurice
- First appearance: Episode 7269; 8 February 2010
- Last appearance: Episode 7303; 26 March 2010
In-universe information
- Husband: Mark Kenworthy

Jane Kenworthy is played by Annie Fitzmaurice. Jane and her husband Mark (Jason Furnival) greet Joe McIntyre (Reece Dinsdale) and Gail McIntyre (Helen Worth) when the latter couple stay at a cottage in the Lake District. Later that night, Jane and Mark see Gail and Joe in a heated argument on Joe's boat. Jane and her husband go on holiday and when they return and learn that Joe has been killed, they go to the police to tell their story. This is the last straw for the police and they arrest Gail for Joe's death. On 26 March, Gail's son David Platt (Jack P. Shepherd) and his friend Graeme Proctor (Craig Gazey) drive to the Lake District and pretend to be interested in purchasing the Kenworthys' boat. When Jane and Mark meet them, David reveals who he actually is and begins trying to convince them of his mother's innocence. Jane and Mark feel threatened by David and Mark calls the police.

== Mark Kenworthy ==
Mark Kenworthy
- Coronation Street character
- Portrayed by: Jason Furnival
- First appearance: Episode 7269; 8 February 2010
- Last appearance: Episode 7303; 26 March 2010
In-universe information
- Wife: Jane Kenworthy

Mark Kenworthy is portrayed by Jason Furnival. Mark and his wife Jane (Annie Fitzmaurice) greet Joe (Reece Dinsdale) and Gail McIntyre (Helen Worth) when the latter couple stay at a cottage in the Lake District. Later that night, Jane and Mark see Gail and Joe in a heated argument on Joe's boat. Mark and his wife go on holiday and when they return and learn that Joe has been killed, they go to the police to tell their story. This is the last straw for the police and they arrest Gail for Joe's death. On 26 March, Gail's son David Platt (Jack P. Shepherd) and his friend Graeme Proctor (Craig Gazey) drive to the Lake District and pretend to be interested in purchasing the Kenworthys' boat. When Jane and Mark meet them, David reveals who he actually is and begins trying to convince them of his mother's innocence. Jane and Mark feel threatened by David and Mark calls the police.

== Grishma Parekh ==
Grishma Parekh
- Coronation Street character
- Portrayed by: Indira Joshi
- Duration: 2010–2011
- First appearance: Episode 7272; 12 February 2010
- Last appearance: Episode 7629; 20 June 2011
In-universe information
- Brothers: Suresh Parekh
- Sisters: Upma Parekh
- Nephews: Jayesh Parekh; Kal
- Nieces: Sunita Alahan
- Other relatives: Aadi Alahan; Asha Alahan; Jaya Parekh

Grishma Parekh, portrayed by Indira Joshi, is the aunt of Sunita Alahan (Shobna Gulati) who comes to stay with her sister Upma. Sunita's ex-husband Dev (Jimmi Harkishin) welcomes the women pretending that he and Sunita are still happily married, as Sunita does not want them to learn that she is, in fact, a single mother. She returned once again on 6 June 2011 to stay with Dev and Sunita. The couple then confess to their lies that they are now divorced and that they are currently living in a small house and that Dev is now owning a corner shop. After this, this made Grishma and Upma feel that Sunita has put shame on their family and so pursues to find her a good husband. They first pursue doctor Matt Carter (Oliver Mellor), but Sunita stops them. They secondly move on Nick Tilsley (Ben Price), but he is not interested. They then finally move on to Marcus Dent (Charlie Condou), until they discover that he is gay, much to their embarrassment. She left for India with Upma on 20 June.

In April 2013, upon Sunita's death in The Rovers Return fire, Dev revealed that Grishma and Upma would not be attending her funeral, falsely believing she had – in starting the fire, killing herself and another person – disgraced the family.

== Quinny ==
Quinny
- Coronation Street character
- Portrayed by: Stephen Bell
- First appearance: Episode 7277; 19 February 2010
- Last appearance: Episode 7427; 6 September 2010
- Spin-off appearances: Coronation Street: Gary's Army Diaries (2011)
In-universe information
- Father: Ian Quinn
- Mother: Kate Quinn

Luke "Quinny" Quinn is an army friend of Gary Windass (Mikey North) portrayed by boxer Stephen Bell. He first appears on screen on 19 February 2010. He and Gary go to the Rovers where Quinny chats up Rosie Webster (Helen Flanagan). The next day, the two go out looking for girls again. The mood is dampened; however, when Quinny discovers that his brother, also in the army, has been injured in a roadside bombing. He vows to continue fighting. The news makes Gary's mother Anna (Debbie Rush) even more worried about her son's career choice.

The character reappears on 6 September 2010, as he accompanies Gary when he comes back to Weatherfield for a visit. He again attempts to woo Rosie Webster to no avail. He and Gary have a candid conversation about their impending service in Afghanistan and agree to tell one another's parents if either of them is killed on duty.

On 15 November 2010, an army officer turns up at the Windasses to inform them that Gary has been injured in an explosion. The officer also informs them that three were killed, including Quinny.

Quinny appears in a special one-off episode entitled Coronation Street: Gary's Army Diaries broadcast on ITV2 on 31 January 2011. The episode focuses on his and Gary's experiences in Afghanistan through the eyes of Windasses' Camcorder.

== D.C. Ben Glynn ==
D.C. Ben Glynn
- Coronation Street character
- Portrayed by: Philip Rowson
- Duration: 2010, 2017, 2021
- First appearance: Episode 7279; 22 February 2010
- Last appearance: Episode 10358; 23 June 2021
- Introduced by: Kim Crowther (2010); Kate Oates (2017); Iain MacLeod (2021)
In-universe information
- Occupation: Police detective

Detective Sergeant Ben Glynn (also Detective Constable Glynn) is a police officer investigating the death of Joe McIntyre (Reece Dinsdale) alongside D.S Carr (Joe Duttine). Both men believe that Joe was murdered and they believe that his wife Gail (Helen Worth) killed him. However, Joe killed himself accidentally in a boating accident while trying to fake his own death. The detectives are seen a lot around Weatherfield, particularly when questioning Gail about his death. They also question Joe's former employer, Bill Webster (Peter Armitage) who tells them about his financial problems and also question the staff at the medical centre where Joe had broken into the following year while addicted to painkillers. When Joe's daughter Tina (Michelle Keegan) starts to suspect Gail, she calls the police and Carr and Glynn arrest her during Joe's wake. The detectives question her at the police station and she is later charged with Joe's murder. When Gail's son David Platt (Jack P. Shepherd) approaches two witnesses to the case, Glynn and Carr warn him that he may face a prison sentence himself. Glynn reappears when it is revealed that he and Carr are working with Gail's cellmate Tracy Barlow (Kate Ford) to try to get more information out of Gail. After Gail is found not guilty of the murder charge, both Glynn and Carr inform Tracy of the verdict, bringing an end to her hopes of a transfer to an open prison.

Glynn reappears seven years later when Ken Barlow (William Roache) is attacked and arrests and questions Ken's grandson, Adam Barlow (Sam Robertson) who is a suspect. After being convinced Adam is not the culprit, he and his colleague DS MacKinnon pursue Ken's adoptive daughter, Tracy, as a new suspect. After an escaped Rob Donovan (Marc Baylis) confirms Tracy's whereabouts, all charges a dropped. Glynn then questions Sinead Tinker (Katie McGlynn) and later Ken's son Daniel Osbourne (Rob Mallard), whose alibi does not stand as the tram ticket he gave Glynn and McKinnon do not correspond. He tells them that his story was true but he threw his real ticket away and gave them a substitution to save questioning. Daniel is then released. Several says later, Glynn and McKinnon re-arrest Adam after Ken recalls Adam's trainers from that night. After Daniel confesses, he is arrested but Ken tells the police that he tripped and fell. As it is unclear to the police which version of events to believe, both Adam and Daniel are released.

When Leanne Battersby (Jane Danson) comes to the police to take down Harvey Gaskell's (Will Mellor) drug ring, he informs her that she may be charged with dealing drugs. He informs Leanne that the police have been watching the gang for a long time. Glynn then asks her to get more evidence on them, so that the police can charge them.

== D.S. Carr ==
D.S. Carr
- Coronation Street character
- Portrayed by: Joe Duttine
- First appearance: Episode 7279; 22 February 2010
- Last appearance: Episode 7359; 10 June 2010
In-universe information
- Occupation: Police Detective

Detective Sergeant Carr is a police officer investigating the death of Joe McIntyre (Reece Dinsdale) alongside D.C. Glynn (Philip Rowson). Both men believe Joe was murdered and they believe that his wife Gail (Helen Worth) killed him. However, Joe killed himself accidentally in a boat accident while trying to fake his own death. The detectives are seen a lot around Weatherfield, especially when questioning Gail about the death. They also question Joe's employer Bill Webster (Peter Armitage) who tells them about Joe's financial problems and the staff at the medical centre. When Joe's daughter Tina McIntyre (Michelle Keegan) starts to suspect Gail, she calls the police and Carr and Glynn arrest her during Joe's wake. They question Gail at the police station and Carr charges her with Joe's murder. Carr later warns Gail's son David Platt (Jack P. Shepherd) when he approaches two witnesses to the case and tells him that he risked a prison sentence himself.

Carr reappears on 14 May 2010 when it is revealed that both he and Glynn are working with Gail's cellmate Tracy Barlow (Kate Ford) to try and extract a confession out of Gail. Both he and Glynn are present at Gail's trial where she is eventually acquitted. Afterwards they both inform Tracy of the verdict, quashing her hopes of being moved to an open prison. Carr subsequently returns Joe's boat and belongings to Gail and her family, much to their indignation, as the court has ordered the return of all Joe's property.

== Dave Bonsall ==
Dave Bonsall
- Coronation Street character
- Portrayed by: Kieran Cunningham
- First appearance: Episode 7292; 12 March 2010
- Last appearance: Episode 7305; 29 March 2010
In-universe information
- Occupation: School administrator

Dave Bonsall is the administrator in charge of an adult education school. John Stape (Graeme Hawley) goes to Dave for an interview when he wants to return to teaching. John chooses to lie about his affair with Rosie Webster (Helen Flanagan) and imprisonment for kidnapping her, and he gets the job. When the school runs a background check on John, a furious Dave fires him and warns him off ever teaching again.

== Lyn Fullwood ==
Lyn Fullwood
- Coronation Street character
- Portrayed by: Susan McCardle
- First appearance: Episode 7298; 19 March 2010
- Last appearance: Episode 7358; 10 June 2010
In-universe information
- Daughters: Shanice

Lyn Fullwood is the cellmate of Gail McIntyre (Helen Worth), when she is awaiting trial for the murder of her husband Joe (Reece Dinsdale). Lyn tries to keep a humorous and cynical attitude to mask her pain over not being able to be with her children. Eventually, Lyn and Gail become close, but Lyn is unexpectedly moved to another cell, and Tracy Barlow (Kate Ford) replaces her as Gail's cellmate. However, after Tracy lies to the police that Gail confessed to killing Joe, Lyn is moved back in, and Gail tells her what has happened. Lyn even offers to ask some of the other prisoners to attack Tracy for revenge, but Gail refuses, saying that that would make her just as bad as Tracy. On 10 June 2010, after Gail is acquitted of the murder charge, Lyn attacks Tracy and puts her in hospital. On 9 July, Lyn sends Gail a card.

== Cheryl Gray ==
Cheryl Gray, played by Holly Quin-Ankrah. She debuted on-screen during the episode airing 9 April 2010. Originally introduced as a love interest for an existing character, Cheryl has been involved in storylines involving lapdancing and domestic abuse since her inception. Cheryl's age was tweaked to accommodate the much younger Quin-Ankrah's real age. In May 2011, it was announced the producers had decided not to renew Quin-Ankrah's contract. She departed on-screen on 18 November 2011. Cheryl has been described as having "positive, caring, family oriented" personality traits. Cheryl's storyline has mainly focused around her relationships with Lloyd Mullaney (Craig Charles) and Chris Gray (Will Thorp). Quin-Ankrah has stated that throughout Cheryl's duration, she has been "caught in the middle" of Chris and Lloyd's fights. In 2010, Quin-Ankrah was nominated for an Inside Soap Award for her portrayal of Cheryl.

== Colin Fishwick ==
Colin Fishwick
- Coronation Street character
- Portrayed by: David Crellin
- First appearance: Episode 7313; 9 April 2010
- Last appearance: Episode 7392; 30 July 2010
In-universe information
- Occupation: Teacher
- Father: John Fishwick
- Mother: Joy Fishwick

Colin Michael Fishwick was an old teaching acquaintance of John Stape (Graeme Hawley), who invites John to his farewell party as he is moving to Canada. At the party, John takes the opportunity to steal enough of Colin's identification to be able to impersonate him at a school. John secures a teaching job using Colin's identity, until Colin makes an untimely return to Weatherfield in July 2010. It is soon revealed that Colin had been having an affair with Vicky Fielding, a married woman prior to his departure and ends up receiving a beating from the woman's husband, Ben (Dominic Gately), after John's wife Fiz (Jennie McAlpine) tells him where Colin is working in order to protect John after Ben threatens him.

Colin attempts to blackmail John stating that he will tell the police about the identity theft unless he gives him £2,000 to flee the country. On 30 July 2010, in the middle of a heated argument with John and former teaching colleague Charlotte Hoyle (Becky Hindley), Colin suddenly collapses and dies from a brain haemorrhage sustained from Ben beating him up. Thinking that the police will accuse him of killing Colin, John persuades Charlotte to help him dispose of his body. After Charlotte accidentally locks her car keys in the boot, they dump it in a hole in the charred remains of the Underworld factory with the intention of moving it later. The next day, when John returns to the hole to remove the body, he finds that the builders working at the site have filled it with concrete. In May 2011 when the Factory Floor is being taken up, John joins Owen Armstrong's (Ian Puleston-Davies) digging crew and removes Colin's decomposing body but is discovered by Fiz. Fiz reluctantly helps John dispose of Colin's body in the canal.

== Brian Packham ==
Brian Packham
- Coronation Street character
- Portrayed by: Peter Gunn
- Duration: 2010–2013, 2015–present
- First appearance: Episode 7317; 15 April 2010
- Introduced by: Kim Crowther (2010); Phil Collinson (2011); Stuart Blackburn (2015); Kate Oates (2016)
In-universe information
- Occupation: Teacher; Newsagent
- Wife: Margaret Packham (until 2011)
- Other relatives: Isabella Benvenuti

Brian Packham, played by Peter Gunn, is introduced as the head of the English department at the high school where John Stape (Graeme Hawley) gets a job working under the name of Colin Fishwick (David Crellin). John has stolen Colin's identity to apply for the job as John's criminal record, which he got due to kidnapping Rosie Webster (Helen Flanagan) in 2008, prevented him from doing so.

The day after John starts his new post as Colin, Brian calls to say that "Colin" has left his mobile phone at school and that he is on his way round to the house to drop it off. When he arrives, he invites himself in and Fiz (Jennie McAlpine) and John worry as they try to hide their true identity within their own house.

Brian returns to the Street in October 2010, when he knocks on John's door to tell him that Colin's mother had contacted the school for his details in order to reunite with him. John is forced to lie to Brian, first claiming that he had fallen out with his mother. Owen Armstrong (Ian Puleston-Davies) then knocks on the Stapes' door and speaks to John about his brother-in-law Chesney Brown's (Sam Aston) relationship with his daughter Katy (Georgia May Foote). He calls John by his name in front of Brian and, after Owen leaves, John tells Brian that he has had to change his name because he had witnessed a murder and was in hiding from a gangland boss. Brian agrees to keep John's secret. Brian then meets Fiz's colleague Julie Carp (Katy Cavanagh) and they have a drink in the Rovers. Brian keeps winking at John whenever he is speaking to him and John tells him to stop, in case it draws attention to him. It isn't long before an attraction develops between Brian and Julie and they start dating. John, terrified that his deception will be uncovered, tries to sabotage their relationship. When Brian and Julie have a romantic meal at a restaurant, John calls Brian's ex-wife and she later shows up and Brian is forced to tell Julie he is married. Julie leaves, devastated. Brian spends the night at the Stapes' and hides when Julie calls at the house. John then convinces Brian to go back to his ex-wife and give his marriage a second chance and he leaves.

He returns in June 2011, questioning Fiz over John's crimes and recent disappearance. Julie sees Brian at Number 5 but angrily storms out after how he left her, though she later admits to Fiz that her feelings for him remain. Julie again comes into contact with Brian when taking Sean Tully's (Antony Cotton) son Dylan Wilson (Connor and Liam McCheyne) to a reading group at Bessie Street Primary School where Brian now works. Brian soon follows her back to the Street and asks her out, with a delighted Julie accepting.

In February 2012, Julie discovers she is pregnant, with Brian being the father. However, she doesn't know that Brian had previously had a vasectomy. When she discovers this, Brian accuses her of cheating on him. Julie is adamant that she had not been with anyone else and that Brian is the actual father, which is true. After a conversation with fellow ex-teacher Ken Barlow (William Roache), Brian realises that vasectomies aren't always 100% effective and that he really is the father of Julie's unborn child. He then apologises to Julie for not believing her and they resume their relationship. Julie discovers that she is not pregnant but has a growth, which led to a positive pregnancy test. To remove the growth Julie has both of her ovaries removed, which means that she cannot have biological children, which both Brian and Julie are upset about. It was revealed on 18 February 2013 that Gunn's contract would not be renewed and the character departed on 18 December 2013. He returned briefly from 12 June 2015 to 3 July 2015, in a storyline that tied in with the exit of Julie.

Brian returns in June 2015, desperate to win Julie back. He knocks on the front door of the flat that he and Julie used to live in. When he is there, he bumps into a parent from the school he used to teach, Beth Sutherland (Lisa George). She reveals that Julie has moved on and is now with Dev Alahan (Jimmi Harkishin) as she finally got over Brian dumping her. The next week, Brian bumps into Julie. She is shocked to see him and tells him that she had heard that he was back in the area. She also reveals that she is over Brian and he should let go of her. He reveals that he has quit his job in Wales for her and also reveals that they have won a holiday in a competition that they entered when they were together and tries to persuade Julie to go away on their holiday with him. He, however, remains determined to win her back. He is also reunited with his best friend, Ken, and moves in with him. In September 2016, it was confirmed that Brian will be returning in November that year. Brian returned permanently on-screen on 18 November 2016.

== Izzy Armstrong ==
Izzy Armstrong, played by Cherylee Houston. The character first appears on-screen on 16 April 2010; she is introduced as a new love interest for Kirk Sutherland. Soon after her arrival she gets a job at the Underworld factory. Upon her debut, she was heralded as the soap's first disabled regular character in 50 years. Izzy was the first member of the Armstrong family to be introduced, her father Owen and sister Katy arrived within two months after her first appearance and is currently the only remaining member of the Armstrong family, following Owen and Katy's departure in early 2015. On 1 July 2016, Izzy was sentenced to three months in prison.

== May Penn ==
May Penn, played by June Whitfield, is an old friend of Blanche Hunt (Maggie Jones), May appears during Blanche's funeral. She makes her first appearance on 3 May 2010 when she arrives at the Barlows' house, where she tells them about Blanche's newfound love Arnold, and then gets drunk. She also appears at her funeral on 10 May 2010.

== Dawn Coghill ==
Dawn Coghill
- Coronation Street character
- Portrayed by: Emma Hartley-Miller
- First appearance: Episode 7334; 7 May 2010
- Last appearance: Episode 7410; 27 August 2010
In-universe information
- Occupation: Social worker

Dawn Coghill is a social worker helping Becky (Katherine Kelly) and Steve McDonald (Simon Gregson) adopt a child. When Dawn turns up to interview them things get off to a bad start as Steve's daughter Amy (Elle Mulvaney) tells Becky that she hates her, in front of Dawn, after learning her great-grandmother, Blanche Hunt (Maggie Jones) has died. Later, Becky believes that Dawn does not want them to adopt and orders her out of the pub. Later Steve persuades Dawn to give them another chance after seeing how good Becky is with Amy. Dawn returns after Becky and Steve have an argument with Eddie Windass (Steve Huison) after wrongly believing that he and his partner Anna (Debbie Rush) have adopted a child, who turns out to be Anna's nephew. Anna later tells Becky, Steve and Dawn this and Dawn calls the rivalry between the McDonalds and the Windasses "damaging".

Dawn appears frequently checking up on the McDonald's' progress. She is part of the adoption panel that interview Becky and Steve in August 2010 when it is decided that they are not suitable candidates to adopt. Dawn reveals that Becky's half-sister, Kylie Platt (Paula Lane), has given her a bad reference, due to Becky leaving the family home when she was young. Dawn later visits the McDonalds' at The Rovers to give them more information about why they were rejected and Becky goes through her bag and finds Kylie's address in order to track her down.

== Hilary Pugsley ==
Hilary Pugsley
- Coronation Street character
- Portrayed by: Caroline Pegg
- Duration: 2010–2011
- First appearance: Episode 7336; 10 May 2010
- Last appearance: Episode 7582; 21 April 2011
In-universe information
- Occupation: Social worker

Hilary Pugsley is a social worker helping Anna (Debbie Rush) and Eddie Windass (Steve Huison) adopt a child. On her first visit in May 2010, she displayed a frosty exterior and requested to sit on a dining room chair due to recent medical exploratory treatment. Hilary declined sampling Eddie's cheesecake, stating she was diabetic. Eddie won Hilary round when he offered to bake her a special diabetic cake.

Hilary appears in January 2011 when she informed Anna that she has found a child who would be an ideal match for her and Eddie. Hilary visits Anna at work to tell her that the visit with Faye Butler (Ellie Leach) had been approved. When Anna and Eddie visit Faye, Hilary and Faye's foster mother observe the meeting. Hilary tells Faye about Gary Windass (Mikey North) being a soldier but notices Anna and Eddie's uncertainty. After the visit, Hilary asks Anna and Eddie about Gary's army career and they tell her that Gary has been discharged for hitting a policeman. Hilary tells them that they'll have to do a CRB on Gary but they should be alright. Hilary takes Faye to the Windasses for her first visit and Hilary tells Anna not to expect much and Faye was upset on the way as she expects to be rejected, but it's a defence mechanism. When Faye stays overnight, Eddie accidentally washes Faye's blanket. Faye is upset as it smelled of her birth mother and insists on going home. When Hilary collects Faye, Faye locks herself in Hilary's car. Hilary advises Anna and Eddie to go indoors as Faye will be less likely to back down if they make a big deal of it.

In April 2011, Hilary visits Anna and Eddie to break the news that Faye's birth mother died of a heroin overdose and that in the circumstances, they should tell Faye. Anna decides to tell Faye after their picnic the following day. When Eddie moves to Germany, Faye wonders if Hilary has to be informed.

== Paul Stokes ==
Paul Stokes
- Coronation Street character
- Portrayed by: Mark Dexter
- First appearance: Episode 7347; 26 May 2010
- Last appearance: Episode 7377; 12 July 2010
In-universe information
- Occupation: Businessman

Paul Stokes is a businessman who begins doing business with Underworld while it is co-owned by Carla Connor (Alison King) and Nick Tilsley (Ben Price). He first turns up to find out that due to a water leak, the factory isn't working up to the expected standards. And after the siege with Tony Gordon (Gray O'Brien), Paul makes an agreement with Nick to use the disused wine bar owned by George Wilson (Anthony Valentine) as a temporary work area. Paul has not been seen since.

== Robbie Sloan ==
Robbie Sloan
- Coronation Street character
- Portrayed by: James Fleet
- First appearance: Episode 7349; 28 May 2010
- Last appearance: Episode 7356; 9 June 2010

Robbie Sloan is the cellmate of Tony Gordon (Gray O'Brien) who in May 2010 helped Tony escape from prison. Robbie is released from prison after serving his sentence but agrees to a deal worth £2,000 to help with Tony's plan to seek revenge (see "Siege Week"). Tony sends him to Weatherfield to get information on Carla Connor (Alison King), Roy Cropper (David Neilson) and his wife Hayley (Julie Hesmondhalgh). Robbie later calls Tony while on the street and Tony tells him he will see him in the morning. The following day, Robbie meets Carla and arranges to meet her at the factory the following day as he is a "market trader" interested in buying some stock from her.

He later helps Tony escape from prison when he threatens Tony's ambulance driver. The two then drive to Weatherfield on a motorbike leaving the prison officer and paramedics locked in the ambulance. The following morning, Robbie tricks Carla into entering the factory alone and holds her hostage and at gunpoint. Robbie forces Carla to evacuate the premises and then leaves her tied to a chair and duct tapes her mouth shut. He then tricks Hayley into coming into the factory. Hayley sees Carla bound and gagged, but Robbie holds her at gunpoint before she can escape, and ties her up too. Tony shows up to Carla's horror. He surveys Carla bound, gagged and helpless, and congratulates Robbie. He rips the tape off her mouth, allowing her to speak, while announcing his plans to murder them. In an episode set on 1 June 2010, but delayed in transmission due to the real-life shootings in Cumbria, Robbie, who has taken part in the kidnapping to get money for his son's university tuition, realises Tony has no money for him as the factory safe is empty. After having an argument over the money, in which Carla and Hayley try to convince him to do the right thing and free them, Tony tricks Robbie into giving him his gun and shoots him dead.

== Police Constable ==
Police Constable
- Coronation Street character
- Portrayed by: Stephen Hoyle
- Duration: 2010–2011
- First appearance: Episode 7351; 31 May 2010
- Introduced by: Kim Crowther
In-universe information
- Occupation: Police Constable

This character appears to be a local police constable for Weatherfield Police. He makes his first appearance in May when he informs Carla Connor (Alison King) that her murderer ex-husband Tony Gordon (Gray O'Brien) had escaped from prison, which makes Carla nervous. Carla is later kidnapped, and held hostage, tied up and gagged, in her factory by Tony. He is later seen informing Roy (David Neilson) and Hayley Cropper (Julie Hesmondhalgh) about Tony's escape.

The character later re-appears when Gary Windass (Mikey North) is involved in a fight with two men who make comments about Izzy Armstrong (Cherylee Houston), leaving one of them badly injured. He arrests Gary the day after and is taken to Weatherfield police station to be questioned. Gary denies everything though and Kirk Sutherland (Andy Whyment) takes the blame in order to save Gary's army career.

The policeman re-appears again in January 2011 when he appears to be doing door-to-door enquires on Coronation Street after the New Year's Eve attack on Tracy Barlow (Kate Ford). He knocks on Tyrone Dobbs's (Alan Halsall) door to ask if he heard anything but Tyrone tells him he was at Sally Webster's (Sally Dynevor) house at the time.

== Russ Gray ==
Russ Gray
- Coronation Street character
- Portrayed by: Robert Simpson (2010); Finton Flynn (2010–2011)
- Duration: 2010–2011
- First appearance: Episode 7350; 28 May 2010
- Last appearance: Episode 7740; 18 November 2011
In-universe information
- Father: Chris Gray
- Mother: Cheryl Gray

Russ Gray is the son of Cheryl (Holly Quin-Ankrah) and Chris Gray (Will Thorp). He made his first on screen appearance on 28 May 2010.

It was reported in May 2011 that the character had been axed from the series along with his on screen family. Russ departed on-screen on 18 November 2011.

Lloyd Mullaney (Craig Charles) discovers Cheryl has a son when he follows her in his taxi. Cheryl also tells a gobsmacked Lloyd that she is married to a man called Chris. After Lloyd learns that Chris has been beating Cheryl, he convinces her to take Russ and move in with him.

Russ still sees his father after his split from Cheryl and later runs away when hearing Lloyd and Steve McDonald (Simon Gregson) talking about Cheryl and turns up at Chris' house, Lloyd soon realises he has disappeared and runs to Prima Doner to Cheryl and the pair hunt for Russ, until Chris walks up the street with Russ to an angry but relieved Cheryl. Chris soon winds up Lloyd by revealing why Russ ran away, which leads to Lloyd punching Chris in front of Russ.

Russ is also seen to making friends with Cheryl's close friend Leanne Battersby's (Jane Danson) stepson Simon Barlow (Alex Bain) and Claire Peacock's (Julia Haworth) sons Joshua (Benjamin Beresford) and Freddie Peacock (Niall Beresford).

In December 2010, Leanne and Nick Tilsley's (Ben Price) new bar "The Joinery" becomes victim to a huge explosion that rocks the street. This causes the viaduct above to be partially destroyed, with a tram derailing and smashing into the corner shop and setting fire to the Peacocks' home. Russ, alongside Freddie, Simon, Joshua and Claire are all trapped inside the house, which is now engaged in a massive inferno. Lloyd then smashes down the front door and rescues Russ, Freddie and Joshua.

Russ leaves Weatherfield in November 2011 with Cheryl after she discovers the truth about Chris' lies about his brain tumour that he had used to win her back and left Lloyd devastated. Before leaving with his mother in a taxi, Russ tells Chris that he hates him for what he has done and bids a tearful goodbye to Lloyd.

== Ben Fielding ==
Ben Fielding
- Coronation Street character
- Portrayed by: Dominic Gately
- First appearance: Episode 7378; 14 July 2010
- Last appearance: Episode 7390; 29 July 2010
In-universe information
- Wife: Vicky Fielding
- Sons: Jon Paul Fielding
- Daughters: Trisha Fielding

Ben Fielding is first seen standing outside No 5. Ben confronts Chesney Brown (Sam Aston) and tells him he is looking for Colin Fishwick (David Crellin), who is having an affair with his wife, while Ben was in prison serving a sentence for GBH. Chesney, unaware of his brother-in-law John Stape's (Graeme Hawley) deception by pretending to be Colin, sends Ben away saying there is no-one called Colin at the address. Ben appears again knocking on the door of No.5, but no one is home. He then stops Claire Peacock (Julia Haworth) with her children Joshua (Benjamin Beresford) and Freddie (Niall Beresford) and asks whether she knows a Colin Fishwick. She tells him she never heard of him and Ben walks off. Ben, still sitting across the street from Number 5, watches Fiz Stape (Jennie McAlpine) arrive home. He then knocks at the door demanding to be let in and pushing Fiz out of the way. Chesney instantly recognises him and Ben tells Fiz that Colin has been having an affair with his wife. John later arrives home and Ben punches him. John then proves to him he is in fact John Stape (Graeme Hawley) and Ben leaves angrily. Two weeks later, Ben appears again, forcing himself into Number 5, and Fiz shouts at him, ordering him to leave, and he threatens her, and after Ben reveals that he knows Colin is in the UK, after John had told him he was in Canada, Ben throws him against the wall and asks John where Colin is and threatens to hit him. In order to protect John, Fiz tells him about Colin's new job in a book store and Ben then leaves after promising to be back if he does not find Colin. He is not seen again but it is revealed that Ben tracked Colin down and beat him up, off-screen.

== Chris Gray ==
Chris Gray
- Coronation Street character
- Portrayed by: Will Thorp
- Duration: 2010–2011
- First appearance: Episode 7369; 1 July 2010
- Last appearance: Episode 7741; 21 November 2011
- Introduced by: Kim Crowther
In-universe information
- Occupation: Builder
- Wife: Cheryl Gray (until 2011)
- Sons: Russ Gray

Chris Gray, played by Will Thorp, made his first on screen appearance on 1 July 2010. The character and Thorp's casting was announced on 13 May 2010. In May 2011, Laura Armstrong of The People reported the character had been axed from the series along with his on screen family. Chris departed on 21 November 2011, shortly after Cheryl and Russ.

Chris is the husband of Cheryl Gray (Holly Quin-Ankrah) and father of Russ Gray (Finton Flynn). He was known to beat Cheryl from time to time, and after learning of her friendship with Street Cars Cab driver Lloyd Mullaney (Craig Charles), he gave her a black eye. Chris first appears as he watches Cheryl get out of Lloyd's taxi, later that night off-screen he hits Cheryl for being with Lloyd.

Chris reappears when he gets a job working on the rebuilding of the Underworld factory for Owen Armstrong (Ian Puleston-Davies), to the fury of Cheryl and Lloyd. To try to get Chris sacked, Lloyd informs Owen of Chris's violent nature but Owen isn't sure whom to believe and Chris tells Lloyd to back off. Cheryl soon gets a job at local takeaway Prima Doner, and when Chris finds out he hangs around Cheryl, and later informs her about his & Lloyd's argument outside Underworld. Chris and Cheryl's son, Russ, runs off after Lloyd and Steve McDonald (Simon Gregson) are talking about Lloyd and Cheryl's relationship and it turns out that he goes to Chris, who decides to take him home rather than call Cheryl. Lloyd punches Chris in the street after he winds him up about the situation.

In October 2010, Chris goes on a date with Maria Connor (Samia Ghadie), but Lloyd again hampers things by informing Maria of Chris's violent side. Maria quickly makes her excuses and leaves, with Chris not happy at Lloyd's interference, and later on warns Cheryl that Lloyd should stay out of his life otherwise watch himself.

In December 2010, Chris is a guest at Peter Barlow's (Chris Gascoyne) stag night party at The Joinery Bar. He provokes Lloyd several times during the evening and eventually trips him over on purpose. This causes Lloyd to lash out and punch Chris in the face and they break into a fight. The fight is cut short, however, when a huge explosion tears through The Joinery. Chris is shown to be injured under the rubble when Lloyd saves Chris by lifting him to safety. Chris is grateful for this and is later shown being tended to in The Rovers by Dr. Carter. Later on, Chris apologises to Lloyd for what he did and they shake hands, suggesting they have put their differences aside.

Despite the fact that he is now dating Maria, Chris is still jealous of Lloyd's relationship with Cheryl. He pays a dodgy friend to burgle Janice Battersby's (Vicky Entwistle) flat and frames Lloyd by placing the stolen goods in the boot of his cab. Lloyd is aghast that he is being blamed for the crime, after Cheryl discovers the gearbag containing the items. However, the couple soon realise that Chris is behind the crime and Cheryl tells her husband that she wants a divorce.

After showing signs of illness, Chris is diagnosed with a brain tumour. He breaks up with Maria and Lloyd invites him to move in with him, Cheryl and Russ. Chris is informed the treatment for his tumour is working, but he tells Cheryl he is getting worse. Chris admits to Cheryl he still loves her and they begin an affair. Lloyd discovers their affair and he has a fight with Chris, which results in Chris hitting his head on the kerb. He is rushed to hospital, where Cheryl discovers his lies and tells him that she and Russ want nothing more to do with him and she later leaves Weatherfield with Russ. Chris's lies become knowledge to the rest of the street and he attempts to start a fight with Lloyd in The Rovers, although he is quickly thwarted by Owen. After being barred from the pub by landlady Stella Price (Michelle Collins), fired from his job by Owen and evicted from his flat by Jason, Chris gets into a taxi and leaves Weatherfield.

== Katy Armstrong ==
Katy Armstrong, played by Georgia May Foote. She made her first screen appearance during the episode broadcast on 30 July 2010. Foote had previously appeared in the soap in January that same year as Jess Burrows. Katy is Owen Armstrong's (Ian Puleston-Davies) youngest daughter and Izzy Armstrong's (Cherylee Houston) sister. Her storylines have mostly revolved around her relationship with Chesney Brown (Sam Aston), becoming a mother to their son, Joseph and beginning an affair with Ryan Connor (Sol Heras). Foote's departure from the show was announced in April 2014, with her having filmed her final scenes on 16 February 2015 and departed on 20 March 2015. In 2017, the character was killed off-screen in a car accident.

== Lydia Radcliffe ==
Lydia Radcliffe, played by former model Lysette Anthony, made a guest appearance on 13 August 2010. The character and casting was announced on 21 June 2010. Anthony filmed her scenes on the same day at a Manchester hotel. Lydia is a businesswoman who is befriended by Lewis Archer (Nigel Havers) in an airport bar.

== Kylie Platt ==
Kylie Platt (also Turner), played by Paula Lane. She was introduced as Becky McDonald's (Katherine Kelly) half-sister, making her on-screen debut on 26 August 2010. Lane landed the role, with executive producer Phil Collinson describing her as a brilliant casting. He also revealed that Kylie would have "major storylines" during her first six months in the serial. Lane created her approach to her portrayal from her own past experiences whilst growing up. Lane impressed the producers and had her contract extended until July 2012. Kylie's backstory includes growing up in a broken home, living below the poverty threshold, and weak relationships with her estranged mother and sister. Kylie is characterised through her "full on personality" and has a feisty attitude. She has often been described as a "gobby female" who wants a better life and ultimately she is driven by money. Kylie has a son, Max (Harry McDermott), who was placed into foster care. She had the child at a young age and she was not ready for the responsibility. Becky helps Kylie retrieve custody of Max. In one of her first big storyline arcs, Kylie sells her son to Becky for £20,000. The storyline was branded controversial by media outlets and Lane found it hard to compress her emotions whilst filming the plot. Lane said Kylie's sheer audacity was highlighted when she dared to blackmail her barren sister for more cash.

== Max Turner ==
Max Turner
- Coronation Street character
- Portrayed by: Harry McDermott (2010–2020); Paddy Bever (2021–2025)
- Duration: 2010–2025
- First appearance: Episode 7413; 29 August 2010
- Last appearance: Episode 11507; 12 March 2025
- Introduced by: Phil Collinson (2010); Iain MacLeod (2021)
In-universe information
- Father: Callum Logan
- Mother: Kylie Platt
- Adoptive father: David Platt
- Stepmother: Shona Platt (adoptive)
- Half-brothers: Harry Platt
- Half-sisters: Lily Platt; Harper Platt (adoptive)
- Grandmothers: Marion Logan; Gail Platt (adoptive)
- Uncles: Nick Tilsley (adoptive)
- Aunts: Becky McDonald; Sarah Platt (adoptive)
- First cousins: Bethany Platt (adoptive); Sam Blakeman (adoptive)
- Other relatives: Audrey Roberts (adoptive); Stephen Reid (adoptive)

Max Turner is the son of Kylie Platt (Paula Lane) and the older half-brother of Lily Platt (Brooke Malonie). He was initially played by Harry McDermott from 2010 to 2020, but in September 2021, it was announced that Max would be recast, with Paddy Bever taking over the role. Max first appears when Kylie visits him at his foster parents' home and on his birthday, she disappears with him, leaving Max's aunt, Becky McDonald (Katherine Kelly), to call the police. Kylie is awarded custody of Max but sells him to Becky and her husband, Steve McDonald (Simon Gregson), for £20,000 and emigrates to Cyprus.

In July 2014, it was announced that Max would highlight the issues of ADHD, with Kylie taking an overdose of his medication. Max begins experiencing hyperactive behaviour which involves misbehaving constantly at school, running out of the house, squirting people with his water pistol, throwing toys down the stairs and emptying the bin over Gail Rodwell (Helen Worth). David suspects something is up. Kylie and David take him to a doctor, who says that he may have ADHD. When David and Kylie prepare Lily's birthday party, Max escapes from the house and rubs chocolate cake over Steve's Volkswagen. Max ruins her party by hogging the bouncy castle, kicking Liam Connor Jr. (Charlie Wrenshall) and throwing toys out of the window, which results in Gail dropping Lily's birthday cake.

Max meets his father Callum Logan (Sean Ward) and instantly bonds with him, leading to David battling custody for Max. At Callum's flat, Max finds a gun in his bedroom and tries to shoot Callum with it. He then takes the gun off him. Max is questioned by the police about the gun and he denies this. Max witnesses Callum and his thugs attack Jason Grimshaw (Ryan Thomas), causing him to fear Callum and refuses to be near him. He tells David and Kylie of what he saw and goes to the police to reveal everything. Max stands up to Callum when he argues with David and tells Callum that he wishes he was dead. Hearing this, Callum tries to grab Max who runs onto the road and into the path of Nick's van. Max badly cuts his leg in the accident. Max loses his father when Kylie hits Callum with a spanner, killing him. David's half-sister Sarah Platt (Tina O'Brien) discovers she is pregnant after being struck by a van and finds out she is expecting a boy. Max believes Callum has returned and pushed Sarah in front of a van, but David and Kylie tell him he is never coming back. Max is told by Kylie and David about Callum's death and he decides not to go to his funeral, but he and Kylie remember him in their own way. Kylie is later stabbed by Clayton Hibbs (Callum Harrison) and dies; David begins a relationship with Shona Ramsey (Julia Goulding), later revealed to be Clayton's mother. As David, Shona, Max and Lily are about to go on holiday, Shona's ex-boyfriend Dane Hibbs (Simon Naylor) locks himself in David's car, with Max and Lily inside. He tells them that Clayton killed Kylie and is Shona's son. Max runs away and is found in an abandoned Underworld factory by David and Shona. He is comforted by David, who tells him that Clayton will never be in the family's lives.

In June 2022, Bever revealed that Coronation Street would be using his character to explore toxic masculinity. He confirmed that within the plot, Max would assume he is talking to classmate Sonya (Isabelle Smith) online, but is instead being catfished, and the perpetrator leaks a nude photograph of him. Bever felt a strong responsibility to portray the issue sensitively and accurately since he knew people in his own life that had had their nude photos leaked. He explained that viewers would see "a lot of toxic masculinity, a lot of bravado and a lot of fear". Bever also spent time researching laws regarding nude photographs since Max would be 15-years-old at the time of the storyline. On 15 January 2025, it was announced that Bever had decided to leave the role and Max departed on 12 March 2025.

== Lawrence Cunningham ==
Lawrence Cunningham
- Coronation Street character
- Portrayed by: Linus Roache
- First appearance: Episode 7417; 5 September 2010
- Last appearance: Episode 7421; 10 September 2010
In-universe information
- Occupation: University Lecturer
- Father: Ken Barlow
- Mother: Susan Cunningham
- Half-brothers: Peter Barlow; Daniel Osbourne
- Half-sisters: Susan Barlow; Tracy Barlow (adoptive)
- Sons: James Cunningham
- Daughters: Chloe Cunningham
- Grandfathers: Frank Barlow
- Grandmothers: Ida Barlow
- Uncles: David Barlow
- Nephews: Adam Barlow; Simon Barlow; Bertie Osbourne
- Nieces: Amy Barlow (adoptive)
- First cousins: Darren Barlow

Lawrence Cunningham is the son of Ken Barlow (William Roache) and Susan Cunningham (Patricia Shakesby).

In May 2010 it was announced that the sons of Coronation Street actor William Roache, Linus and James respectively, would join the cast on a short-term basis. The characters to be played were the homophobic son (Lawrence) and homosexual grandson (James) of Ken Barlow, which he did not know he had.

Lawrence makes his first appearance on 5 September 2010, after Norris Cole (Malcolm Hebden) finds a letter addressed to Ken hidden in the skirting board of No. 3, the house that the Barlow family inhabited in 1960. Upon reading the letter, Ken explains that it is from his first love Susan, and he is keen to find out what it is that she wanted. Ken soon manages to track down Susan's son, Lawrence, who informs him that his mother died a few years before and they arrange to meet. When the two eventually come face to face, however, Ken's wife Deirdre (Anne Kirkbride) notices an uncanny similarity between them and suggests that they could be father and son, a suspicion later confirmed when Ken asks Lawrence his birth date. It was mentioned that Lawrence was in a rocky marriage due to his infidelity, another trait he and his father had in common as noticed by Deirdre, but was left widowed when his wife dies from cancer.

It soon becomes apparent that there is a rift between Lawrence and his son James, who is gay, which Lawrence disapproves of. Ken visits Lawrence and tries to resolve things between father and son but James and Lawrence argue and James storms out. Lawrence later visits Ken to try and explain himself. Lawrence claims that he is entitled to his point of view but Ken is disgusted by Lawrence's homophobia and throws him out. Lawrence has not been seen since. In 2015, he could not attend Deirdre's funeral. It is unlikely that he was unaware of her death, with them having no contact.

== James Cunningham ==
James Cunningham
- Coronation Street character
- Portrayed by: James Roache
- Duration: 2010–2011
- First appearance: Episode 7419; 6 September 2010
- Last appearance: Episode 7650; 21 July 2011
In-universe information
- Father: Lawrence Cunningham
- Sisters: Chloe Cunningham
- Grandfathers: Ken Barlow
- Grandmothers: Susan Cunningham
- Uncles: Peter Barlow; Daniel Osbourne
- Aunts: Susan Barlow; Tracy Barlow (adoptive)
- First cousins: Adam Barlow; Simon Barlow; Bertie Osbourne; Amy Barlow (adoptive)
- Other relatives: David Barlow; Darren Barlow

James Cunningham is the son of Lawrence Cunningham (Linus Roache), played by James Roache. James' grandfather, Ken Barlow (William Roache), never knew Lawrence and James existed until 2010 when Norris Cole (Malcolm Hebden), who lives in Ken's old house, discovers a letter from James' grandmother Susan Cunningham (Patricia Shakesby) behind a skirting board telling him she was pregnant with his child. After Ken contacts Lawrence, he discovers he has a son, James, and a daughter, Chloe. James visits Ken in The Rovers and tells him he does not get on with his father because he is gay. James reveals that he works at a charity shop and has been a musician, playing the guitar. Ken visits Lawrence at his home and tries to resolve things between his son and grandson but James storms out after another argument with his father erupts. Ken falls out with Lawrence as he feels he cannot accept his son's homosexuality. James later visits Ken at his home and reveals that he did not make it easy for Lawrence to accept him being gay by having an older boyfriend and rubbing his father's face in his sexuality. James tells Ken that he should not bother trying to change Lawrence's views and that he is happy that he has a new grandfather, telling Ken it is a result. In October 2010, James sends Ken a card on his 71st birthday, indicating that they have kept in touch.

James visits the Barlows again at the end of April 2011, meeting Ken's adoptive daughter Tracy (Kate Ford) for the first time. When James explains that he is moving to the area, as the charity he works for are opening a homeless hostel locally, Ken offers him a place to stay while he gets settled. James accepts the offer and moves in a few days later.

Sophie Webster (Brooke Vincent) and her girlfriend Sian Powers (Sacha Parkinson) work at the soup kitchen with James as volunteers, after he persuades them to join. The premises is burgled and Sophie gives James money for repairs, angering her father Kevin (Michael Le Vell), who disapproves of the venture. However, Sophie ignores him and carries on working at the centre. She steals £20,000 from Kevin's scratchcard money, to fund the venture. When the soup kitchen is revealed to be a fake set up by a gang of con artists, Kevin is furious and confronts James, who claims to know nothing of the scam. When James gets a surveyor to value the Barlows' house, Tracy's daughter Amy Barlow (Elle Mulvaney) overhears an incriminating conversation and says she is going to tell Tracy and Ken. James threatens Amy, saying that the man could send Tracy back to prison. Tracy confronts James, who denies everything. Ken and Deirdre believe him. However, when Ken discovers that James has fraudulently obtained a cheque for £50,000 against the house, James says that he would rather be a conman than be a miserable old man like Ken. As Ken is about to phone the police, James attacks him knocking him unconscious. James then gets his belongings and leaves.

== Jack Webster ==
Jack Webster
- Coronation Street character
- Portrayed by: Jaxon and Maddox Beswick (2010–2016); Kyran Bowes (2016–present)
- Duration: 2010–present
- First appearance: Episode 7419; 6 September 2010
- Introduced by: Phil Collinson
In-universe information
- Other names: Jack Dobbs
- Father: Kevin Webster
- Mother: Molly Dobbs
- Stepfather: Tyrone Dobbs
- Stepmother: Sally Webster; Abi Webster
- Half-brothers: Jake Webster
- Half-sisters: Rosie Webster; Sophie Webster
- Grandfathers: Bill Webster
- Grandmothers: Alison Webster
- Aunts: Debbie Webster
- First cousins: Carl Webster
- Other relatives: Pam Hobsworth

Jack Webster (also Dobbs), played by twins Jaxon and Maddox Beswick from September 2010 to April 2016, and Kyran Bowes from April 2016, made his first screen appearance on 6 September 2010. Of Jack, Kate White writing for Inside Soap said "We love baby Jack Webster. He's gorgeous and keeps giving Sally looks that say, 'I've got the measure of you!' Our new favourite soap little'un!" The role was recast in April 2016 to Kyran Bowes.

Jack is the son of established characters Kevin Webster (Michael Le Vell) and Molly Dobbs (Vicky Binns). He was born in September 2010 after being conceived during an affair between Kevin and Molly. He is named after Jack Duckworth (Bill Tarmey). Molly's husband Tyrone Dobbs (Alan Halsall) was unaware of Molly's affair with Kevin and initially believed baby Jack to be his son. At baby Jack's christening, Kevin steals his soother to get a DNA test. Kevin receives the results the next day confirming that he was actually baby Jack's father. He then confronts Molly with the results as Jack overhears the conversation from the stairs but he does not tell Tyrone. In December 2010, during the 50th anniversary, Molly finally admits to Tyrone that he is not Jack's father and that she had an affair. Tyrone is distraught and tells Molly never to come back as she is leaving. Molly is in the Corner Shop with Jack, saying goodbye to Sunita Alahan (Shobna Gulati) when Kevin comes in to buy some milk. She tells him to say goodbye to Jack, which he does. He then leaves the shop and just as Molly is about to leave, an explosion tears through the shop, after a tram derails and crashes on to the Street. Molly protects Jack and they are buried by rubble. After Jack's crying is overheard, they are found and Jack is rushed to hospital with Tyrone. Molly is fatally injured and with her dying breath, confesses to Kevin's wife Sally Webster (Sally Dynevor) that Kevin is Jack's father. She then says that Jack is the only thing she did not regret from her affair with Kevin, and asks Sally to look after Jack, before dying.

At Molly's funeral, Tyrone realises that Kevin is Jack's father and punches him, causing him to fall into Molly's grave. Sally later takes Jack from Gail McIntyre (Helen Worth) who is looking after him, and gives him to Tyrone saying that Kevin does not deserve Jack and that Tyrone is the only father he knows. After Tyrone expresses doubts at having to bring up Jack, he forces Kevin to take Jack. Kevin brings Jack home much to both Sally and their daughter Rosie Webster's (Helen Flanagan) consternation. Kevin moves out of the family home, taking Jack with him, but returns a few days later after getting himself a new flat. Rosie and her boyfriend Jason Grimshaw (Ryan Thomas) take Jack to a modelling shoot and Rosie accidentally picks up the wrong baby and leaves Jack at the studio. When Kevin eventually finds him, he tells Rosie that she is selfish and that he wants her to stay away from him and Jack, leaving Rosie devastated. Rosie and Kevin later make up, however, and when Kevin and Sally attend a hearing to decide whether Sally is entitled to have half of Kevin's lottery scratchcard winnings, Rosie offers to look after Jack again and Kevin lets her do so. After Kevin is injured in an accident at work, Sally offers to look after Jack and lets him stay with them until he has recovered. Jack leaves Weatherfield with Kevin to look after Kevin's father Bill Webster (Peter Armitage), who is ill.

When Kevin and Jack return in August 2014, Kevin starts a relationship with Jenny Bradley (Sally Ann Matthews) in March 2015. Kevin's daughter Sophie Webster (Brooke Vincent) doesn't approve of the relationship as she suspects Jenny is up to something, but Kevin refuses to listen. Jenny becomes attached to Jack and it is later discovered that Jenny's son Tom died after drowning in a paddling pool and he was the same age as Jack. In June 2015, Jenny plans to take Jack and rents a flat in Hull under the name "Jenny Midgeley". Jenny is found in Hull by Kevin, Sophie and her foster mother Rita Tanner (Barbara Knox) and Jenny hands Jack back after Rita talks to her. When Jenny returns to the street in early 2016, Jack wanders into the factory, and when Jenny takes Jack back to Kevin, she is accused of taking him.

Producers placed Jack at the centre of a new storyline tackling sepsis and amputation in 2018. The show developed the storyline with the help of a sepsis charity, The Sepsis Trust, and Bowes was introduced to Sasha Burrell, a 14-year-old girl who had her legs amputated after being diagnosed with sepsis. Bowes was nervous about portraying the issue, but carried out research and felt "excited and proud to be trusted with such a big, important storyline". Burrell explained her condition to Bowes, which he found helpful and used to portray Jack's storyline. Bowes described Burrell as "incredible and so inspirational to me and to others". Bowes found the scenes which feature Jack discovering he has lost his leg challenging and tried to portray them accurately. He commented, "I hope I have done the story proud for Coronation Street and for all the people who have suffered sepsis." Laura-Jayne Tyler of Inside Soap praised Bowes' performance in the storyline and called the scenes "very demanding". Tyler's colleague, Sarah Ellis, also praised Bowes, stating that the storyline "may have been tough, but young Kyran did a stellar job."

== DS Redfern ==
DS Redfern
- Coronation Street character
- Portrayed by: Paul Warriner
- Duration: 2010–2011
- First appearance: Episode 7448; 18 October 2010
- Last appearance: Episode 7727; 31 October 2011
In-universe information
- Occupation: Police officer

Detective Sergeant Redfern, played by Paul Warriner, is a local police officer. He is first seen, as a Detective Constable, when he investigates the accident in which Graeme Proctor (Craig Gazey) is run over by a car driven by David Platt (Jack P. Shepherd). Graeme's girlfriend Tina McIntyre (Michelle Keegan), David's ex-girlfriend, tells Redfern that she thinks that David ran Graeme down deliberately. Redfern arrests and interviews David and he claims that he cannot remember anything before the accident. Redfern charges David with attempted murder but it is later discovered that he was suffering an epileptic fit when the accident occurred.

Redfern reappears in January 2011 to investigate the attack on Tracy Barlow (Kate Ford) on New Year's Eve. Redfern and his colleague DC Moore (Pooja Shah) interview Steve McDonald (Simon Gregson), Nick Tilsley (Ben Price), Gail McIntyre (Helen Worth) and David, all of whom have a motive for attacking Tracy. Redfern and Moore encounter Norris Cole (Malcolm Hebden) and Mary Taylor (Patti Clare) in the Street and ask them for information about the attack and Norris implicates Becky McDonald (Katherine Kelly) as a potential suspect. Redfern recognises Mary and reveals that he investigated an incident involving her and a chainsaw. As Redfern and Moore question Becky at The Rovers, she makes it clear that she does not like Tracy and tells the detectives that she does not have to prove anything to them.

After Tracy regains consciousness, Redfern and Moore later arrest Becky after Tracy identifies her as her attacker, and Becky denies this when being questioned. Claire Peacock (Julia Haworth) then goes to the police station and confesses to being Tracy's attacker. Redfern interviews Claire and offers her a solicitor. Claire refuses and describes the attack to Redfern. The following day, Claire surrenders her passport and is released on bail, pending further enquiries. The detectives then return to the hospital to get a revised statement from Tracy. The following day, after completing their enquiries, Redfern and Moore return to the Street to arrest Claire, but she hides in the ginnel behind a bin and Redfern does not find her. After falling for a decoy set by Steve and Tina, Redfern and Moore give up and drive away, allowing Claire to make her escape with her sons Joshua (Benjamin Beresford) and Freddie (Niall and Luke Beresford) with the help of Jason Grimshaw (Ryan Thomas) who drives them to the airport.

Redfern returns once again in June 2011 when John Stape (Graeme Hawley) goes on the run after being exposed as the killer of Charlotte Hoyle (Becky Hindley) after holding Charlotte's parents Alan (Michael McStay) and Dorothy (Jean Fergusson) prisoner in their cellar along with his brother-in-law Chesney Brown (Sam Aston). Redfern questions John's wife Fiz (Jennie McAlpine) about his whereabouts and his mental state. Fiz tells Redfern everything she knows about John's crimes and explains that he was on anti-depressants and shows Redfern the medication. Redfern later tells Fiz and Chesney that there have been sightings of John on CCTV but they have no other leads. Redfern asks Fiz if John has any friends who could be unwittingly sheltering him and she suggests Brian Packham (Peter Gunn). The following day Redfern informs Fiz that John was seen frequently visiting Joy Fishwick's (Doreen Mantle) house in the weeks leading up to her death. He asks Fiz if she knows anything about John's visits to Joy but she denies it. Redfern attends the hospital and takes more details from Fiz after he kidnaps their daughter Hope (Sadie Pilbury and Harriet Atkins). Redfern, along with Fiz and Chesney, pursues John on to the roof of the hospital and after handing Hope over to Fiz he jumps from the rooftop. Redfern later informs Fiz that John's body has not been found, indicating that he had survived the fall and escaped. By this time Redfern has been promoted to Detective Sergeant.

The following day, Redfern visits Fiz in her hospital room and reveals that they know John worked at a school in Rochdale, teaching under Colin Fishwick's (David Crellin) identity. Fiz denies any knowledge of this. Redfern later visits Fiz at home with a female detective and after informing her that John had been sighted on CCTV boarding a ferry to Ireland at Holyhead, he tells her that they have discovered that she fraudulently obtained money from Joy's will by posing as Colin's wife. Fiz then breaks down and reveals that Colin is dead and she helped John dispose of his body and Redfern arrests her for Colin's murder. At the police station, Fiz explains to Redfern that she found John digging up Colin's body from underneath the Underworld factory, where she worked, and that she helped John dispose of the body by dumping it in the canal. Fiz then takes Redfern to the canal and shows him the location where they dumped the body. Back at the police station, Redfern continues to interrogate Fiz and she denies knowing that Colin was dead, before the previous week, and denies being involved in his death. Fiz's solicitor asks for the interview to be terminated and Redfern arrests her for the unrelated crime of fraudulently obtaining the money from Joy's will by deception and Fiz is held in custody overnight.

Redfern returns to speak to Carla Connor (Alison King), while she is drinking in The Rovers. Carla is defensive and accuses Redfern of being heavy-handed towards her. Peter Barlow (Chris Gascoyne) intervenes and asks Redfern to back off and Redfern tells him that he is obstructing police duties. Carla tells Redfern that she is too drunk to speak to him and that he should come back at a more suitable time when she is sober and he leaves. Redfern visits Fiz again while she is holding a children's party with Maria Connor (Samia Smith), Sean Tully (Antony Cotton) and Marcus Dent (Charlie Condou). Redfern tells her that they have exhumed Joy Fishwick's body and that she has injuries that suggest she was involved in a struggle. Fiz again denies any involvement in her death. The following day, Redfern questions Roy (David Neilson) and Hayley Cropper (Julie Hesmondhalgh) about the night of Colin's death, which was also the night of Chesney's 16th birthday party. Roy and Hayley reveal to Redfern that Fiz left the party to go and look for John. Redfern then questions Fiz about her movements and she confirms that she did indeed leave the party. Redfern alleges that she helped John kill Colin and help dispose of his body and Fiz again protests her innocence.

In July 2011, Redfern arrives at the factory in time to witness a confrontation between Fiz and her colleague Sally Webster (Sally Dynevor). Redfern arrests Fiz again and takes her to the police station. He tells her that a post-mortem examination revealed that Colin had suffered a fractured skull. Fiz tells him that the day before his death, Colin had been beaten by the husband of a woman he had been having an affair with. Redfern accuses Fiz of lying to protect John and alleges that she helped him kill Colin, Charlotte and Joy. Redfern then charges Fiz with Colin's murder.

Redfern returns in October 2011 when he gives evidence at Fiz's trial. He tells the court that Fiz lied during the initial stages of the police enquiry, claiming she knew nothing of John's identity theft and that she never met Joy. Redfern also states that Fiz had claimed that the first time she went to the Hoyles' house was when she followed John there and rescued Chesney and the Hoyles, leading to an angry reaction from Dorothy in the public gallery. Redfern also tells the court that John and Fiz had not told any of their friends and neighbours about the identity theft, implying that they had been acting together. Redfern visits Chesney in the café and receives a hostile response from him. Redfern tells Chesney that John has been hospitalized after being injured in a car crash and had kidnapped Rosie Webster (Helen Flanagan). Redfern tells Chesney that John's condition is critical and he remarks that it is ironic that John is the most hated man in Weatherfield but everyone wants him to recover in order to clear Fiz's name. Redfern later goes to the hospital to take a statement from John. Redfern sets up a camera to film the interview and John describes the details of Colin's death and proves Fiz's innocence. The following week, Redfern returns to the street. Rosie spots him and asks for updates on the case but he refuses to tell her, explaining that the investigation is still ongoing. Redfern then visits Chesney and his girlfriend Katy Armstrong (Georgia May Foote) and Chesney demands an apology for Fiz's arrest. Redfern asks to check their outside toilet where John had claimed he had hidden the hammer he used to kill Charlotte. Redfern searches the outside toilet and finds the hammer and Chesney tells him that it should prove Fiz's innocence. Redfern arranges for the hammer to be taken for forensic tests. Redfern is last seen attending Fiz's sentencing.

== Joy Fishwick ==
Joy Fishwick
- Coronation Street character
- Portrayed by: Doreen Mantle
- Duration: 2010–2011
- First appearance: Episode 7473; 22 November 2010
- Last appearance: Episode 7512; 13 January 2011
In-universe information
- Husband: John Fishwick
- Sons: Colin Fishwick

Joy Fishwick was the mother of the late Colin Fishwick (David Crellin), played by actress Doreen Mantle. She makes her first appearance on 22 November 2010 when she arrives at the home of John (Graeme Hawley) and Fiz Stape (Jennie McAlpine) looking for her son. Unbeknownst to Joy, Colin had died in July during a confrontation with John, prompting a frantic John and former teaching colleague Charlotte Hoyle (Becky Hindley) to cover up his death by hiding the body beneath the Underworld factory while the site was under construction.

When Fiz tells Joy about Colin's job, Joy goes to the bookshop where Colin had been working. She soon learns that he has not been seen since he was attacked in late July by Ben Fielding (Dominic Gately). Joy returns to the Stapes' house quite distressed and collapses as a result of her poor health. John later lies to Joy that he has spoken to Colin over the phone and that he has returned to Canada.

On 3 January 2011, Joy reappears when John and Fiz bump into her unexpectedly at the hospital. She reveals that she has been diagnosed with chronic heart disease and is dying.

On 10 January, John visits Joy to drop off some shopping and ensure that she is alright due to her illness. However, Joy attempts to contact son, Colin, by telephone on a number John had given to her, but she discovers that she is in fact calling John's mobile. She is left confused and annoyed with John as he tries to explain why he has given her his phone number. Eventually he confesses the truth to her about Colin's death and about how he murdered Charlotte Hoyle despite his earlier claim that she was killed in the tram crash. During his confession a neighbour calls in on Joy to return an item of hers and John covers her mouth to prevent her from screaming for help. Joy suffers a heart attack and dies. John attempts to revive her using her angina spray but is unsuccessful. He clears his finger prints from the bottle and puts it in her hand to make it look like she died of natural causes.

Two days later John returns to Joy's house to remove any incriminating evidence and discovers that she has not been found yet. He is surprised by Joy's neighbour, Clifford, who helps him gain entry to the house by kicking the door down. Clifford discovers Joy is dead and calls emergency services to report her death while John clears up the meal that Joy had cooked for him and wipes up fingerprints to remove any evidence to cover his tracks.

== Dorothy Hoyle ==
Dorothy Hoyle
- Coronation Street character
- Portrayed by: Jean Fergusson
- Duration: 2010–2011
- First appearance: Episode 7480; 1 December 2010
- Last appearance: Episode 7723; 27 October 2011
In-universe information
- Husband: Alan Hoyle
- Daughters: Charlotte Hoyle

Dorothy Hoyle is Charlotte Hoyle's (Becky Hindley) mother. She is introduced when Charlotte invites her parents over to meet John Stape (Graeme Hawley) and had dinner with them. She is later revealed to be an alcoholic and takes a great liking to John. She reappears a week later with Alan when they receive the news that Charlotte has been injured in a tram crash on Coronation Street. They are told that she may never regain consciousness, so they both decide to switch off her life support machine. However, they then requested a second opinion from John, in which he agrees, not knowing that he is the one who is actually responsible for her injury. Along with husband Alan (Michael McStay), they invite John to have Christmas dinner with them and he unwillingly ends up joining them both. In April 2011 Dorothy and Alan see John pushing lots of twenty pound notes down their letter box they invite him inside for a drink, he explains he is sorry, which confuses Dorothy and Alan and he gives them money they reject it. Later Alan and Dorothy speak and decide that they need to call someone to help John so Alan finds John's mobile and calls Fiz Stape (Jennie McAlpine) not knowing she is John's wife to pick him up, when Fiz get to their house she picks John up and drives home.

Chesney Brown (Sam Aston) returns to the Hoyles' house a few weeks later posing as "Colin's" brother, he questions them about "Colin" and finds out he was engaged to Charlotte. Chesney decides to tell them that "Colin" lives at Number 5 Coronation Street. They track him down and John has lunch with them, it's clear that the Hoyles are getting suspicious. As John and Alan go down to their basement, Dorothy sees John's driving licence as she attempts to find his ringing phone, realising who he really is, she goes to confront him in the basement, and fearing that his involvement in Charlotte's death and Joy Fishwick's (Doreen Mantle) suspicious death, John quickly ties them up along with Chesney, and holds them hostage in the cellar. Later, however, she is freed along with Alan and Chesney when Fiz discovers the truth. Dorothy and Alan return in October for Fiz's trial. Dorothy gives evidence for the prosecution and affirms her belief of Fiz's guilt.

== Alan Hoyle ==
Alan Hoyle
- Coronation Street character
- Portrayed by: John Woodvine (2010); Michael McStay (2011)
- Duration: 2010–2011
- First appearance: Episode 7480; 1 December 2010
- Last appearance: Episode 7723; 27 October 2011
In-universe information
- Wife: Dorothy Hoyle
- Daughters: Charlotte Hoyle

Alan Hoyle is the father of Charlotte Hoyle (Becky Hindley). Initially played by John Woodvine, Alan first appears when Charlotte invites her parents over to meet John Stape (Graeme Hawley) and to have dinner with them, believing him to be Colin Fishwick. He and his wife Dorothy (Jean Fergusson) later meet John at the hospital when they are informed that Charlotte has been injured in the tram crash. They are told that Charlotte is unlikely to recover from her injuries and they, with John, make the decision to switch off her life support machine. Alan and Dorothy attend Charlotte's funeral and are confused when some of John's colleagues attend the service and call him by his real name. John reluctantly joins Alan and Dorothy for Christmas dinner after they spot him on Coronation Street while visiting the scene of Charlotte's death. In April 2011, Dorothy and Alan (now played by Michael McStay) discover John pushing money through their letter box and they invite him inside for a drink. John tells them that he is sorry and this confuses Dorothy and Alan and when he insists that they have the money, they reject it. Concerned for John's welfare, Alan and Dorothy to call someone to help John. Alan finds John's mobile phone on his jacket and calls Fiz Stape (Jennie McAlpine) not knowing she is John's wife, to pick him up. Fiz later arrives at their house, picks John up and drives him home. Fiz's brother Chesney Brown (Sam Aston) returns to the Hoyles' house a few weeks later posing as Colin's brother. He questions them about 'Colin' and they tell him that he was engaged to Charlotte. Chesney tells them that "Colin" lives at No. 5 Coronation Street and invites them to visit. They do so and John returns to their house and has lunch with them. Alan and Dorothy become suspicious of John as his behaviour becomes more erratic. As Alan invites John down to their basement, Dorothy discovers John's driving licence as she attempts to find his phone when it rings, and discovers his real name. She goes to confront John in the basement and he panics and ties Alan and Dorothy up. He is last seen when Chesney, him and Dorothy are finally freed and Fiz finds out the truth about John. Alan and Dorothy return in October for Fiz's trial. Alan supports his wife as she gives evidence for the prosecution. Alan is last seen whispering to Dorothy in the public gallery as Rita Sullivan (Barbara Knox) gives evidence, explaining that she saw Charlotte helping John dispose of Colin Fishwick's (David Crellin) body.

== Paul Kershaw ==
Paul Kershaw
- Coronation Street character
- Portrayed by: Tony Hirst
- Duration: 2010–2013
- First appearance: Episode 7486; 8 December 2010
- Last appearance: Episode 8196; 21 August 2013
In-universe information
- Occupation: Firefighter
- Wife: Lesley Kershaw (until 2012)

Paul Kershaw, played by Tony Hirst, made his first screen appearance on 8 December 2010. Paul is a fireman and is part of the emergency crew deployed to the Coronation Street when an explosion from The Joinery Bar, causes a tram to derail and fall onto the street. One of the trapped people is resident Molly Dobbs (Vicky Binns), pinned underneath the wreckage of the Corner Shop with her baby son, Jack. Paul is the first fireman to make his way through the rubble to Molly and Jack where he comforts her and rescues the baby, promising to be back with more men and equipment. He does return, telling her that they need specialist lifting equipment but he is obviously perturbed at the sight of the blood seeping from her body. He takes charge of cutting away the rubble from around Molly in an effort to get her out and save her life but all their efforts prove to be in vain as she bleeds to death.

Paul reappears on the street when he is called to Underworld as Eileen Grimshaw (Sue Cleaver) has got her head stuck between some railings. There is an immediate attraction between them and they date a couple of times but it is clear to Eileen that Paul is being quite stand-offish with her and she is suspicious. She is devastated when her lodger Marcus Dent (Charlie Condou) reveals that he saw Paul at Freshco's with another woman. When Eileen storms around to his house to confront him, she is greeted by Lesley, Paul's wife, who is strangely oblivious to what Eileen is telling her. Paul is forced to reveal that Lesley has early onset Alzheimer's and he found himself longing for companionship with other people. Paul and Eileen agree to be friends. Lesley starts to act violently and Paul confides in Eileen. She later invites him and Lesley for a Christmas drink, but Lesley starts to become increasingly confused and asks to go home. Eileen agrees to look after Lesley while Paul works. When Lesley starts destroying items in the house, Eileen calls Paul to collect her. Eileen visits Paul that and he explains that he has booked a one-night stay at a home for Lesley for his own good. Paul's house is flooded and Eileen invites him and Lesley to stay with her, much to the annoyance of Eileen's son, Jason (Ryan Thomas). Lesley becomes more agitated and violent and Eileen tells Paul that there is no future between them. When Lesley takes Amy Barlow (Elle Mulvaney) to a park, her mother Tracy (Kate Ford) yells at both Paul and Lesley and mentions that Lesley should be in a care home. Paul does eventually place Lesley in a care home and he and Eileen book a holiday. Lesley runs away from the care home and Paul goes to collect her when she is found. He tries to force her into his car to take her back to the care home, but she slips and sprains her wrist. The police arrive the next day, but go when Paul explains Lesley is ill and it was an accident. Paul proposes to Eileen and tells her he wants to divorce Lesley. Paul goes to meet a divorce lawyer, while Eileen looks after Lesley. On his return, he is told that Lesley has died after being electrocuted. He identifies her body and returns home to Eileen, who confesses that she left Lesley alone. Paul becomes angry and leaves. Paul and Eileen soon reconcile. Eileen become suspicious of Paul who she thinks is having an affair with a work mate named Toni Griffiths (Tara Moran) when he is actually planning a romantic proposal. Paul gets upset by this and walks out to the Rovers, soon followed by Eileen. Eileen asks Paul for forgiveness and he gets down on one knee and asks her to marry him. Paul is next seen taking part in the Bistro's Full Monty performance but as it gets to the final Norris Cole (Malcolm Hebden) comes in and tells everyone that the Rovers Return is on fire. Hearing this Paul goes to the pub and helps get Stella Price (Michelle Collins) out of one of the bedrooms while Toni goes to get Karl Munro (John Michie) out, which she succeeds before the roof caves in and kills her leaving Paul devastated. Eileen struggled to come to terms with Paul continuing to work in the fire service following the fire at the Rovers. Paul and Eileen agree it is best that they separate and Paul gets a transfer to North Yorkshire Fire and Rescue Service and goes to leave but decides to come back to Eileen. During a game of darts with Steve McDonald (Simon Gregson) and Jason, Paul says 'Play the white man' after losing and this comment unintentionally offends Lloyd Mullaney (Craig Charles) and his daughter Jenna Kamara (Krissi Bohn). Lloyd forces Paul to apologise for making the remark but he refuses, and so Lloyd accuses Paul of being a racist. This row even affects home when Eileen and Jason fail to convince Paul to apologise to Lloyd.

== Hope Dobbs ==
Hope Dobbs
- Coronation Street character
- Portrayed by: Harriet Atkins (2011); Sadie Pilbury (2011); Ava & Isla McCulloch (2011–2012); Faith & Nicole Holt (2012–2017); Isabella Flanagan (2017–present)
- Duration: 2010–present
- First appearance: Episode 7487; 9 December 2010
In-universe information
- Other names: Hope Stape
- Father: John Stape
- Mother: Fiz Brown
- Adoptive father: Tyrone Dobbs
- Stepfather: Phill Whittaker
- Sisters: Ruby Dobbs (adoptive)
- Half-brothers: Dorin Pop (adoptive)
- Half-sisters: Jade Rowan
- Grandfathers: Ross Wilkes (adoptive)
- Grandmothers: Cilla Battersby-Brown; Cassie Plummer (adoptive)
- Uncles: Chesney Brown
- First cousins: Joseph Brown; Aled Winter-Brown; Carys Winter-Brown; Llio Winter-Brown; Bryn Winter-Brown

Hope Dobbs (also Stape) is the daughter of John (Graeme Hawley) and Fiz Stape (Jennie McAlpine). She made her first on-screen appearance on 9 December 2010, during the 50th anniversary. The character was created to lighten the situation surrounding the December 2010 tram crash and to provide "Hope" for the other characters involved in the storyline. She has been played by Sadie Pilbury and Harriet Atkins from 2011 until 2012, twins Faith and Nicole Holt from 2012 to 2017, and Isabella Flanagan since August 2017. Flanagan is the younger sister of Amelia Flanagan, who plays April Windsor in Emmerdale and since October 2017, Flanagan's twin brother William has been portraying the role of Hope's cousin Joseph Brown. It was announced in mid-2015 that Hope would be diagnosed with a form of childhood cancer called neuroblastoma. Following its conclusion, the cancer storyline was heavily criticised for "trivialising" the condition.

In August 2010, Fiz tells John that she is pregnant. Fiz goes into labour after being thrown to the ground as a result of the tram crash. She gives birth to her daughter four months early in the hospital. Following the birth, the baby is placed in an incubator and Fiz names her Hope. Four days later, Fiz learns that Hope will need a transfusion to fight off an infection, due to her weak immune system. In January 2011, it is revealed Hope has got a hole in her heart leading to Fiz's colleagues at the factory to help raise money for Hope, including Sally Webster (Sally Dynevor) who hates John as he had previously kidnapped her daughter Rosie Webster (Helen Flanagan), and in total raise £100. Hope comes home in March 2011. John then suffers a mental illness and kidnaps Hope when Fiz is rushed to hospital after a road accident, after trying to chase John to get Hope back. Fiz realises that Hope is in danger and catches John up to the roof. He eventually hands Hope back to Fiz, before falling off the roof to the ground. Hope lives in the prison with Fiz in the mother and baby unit; however, Fiz is released and both Fiz and Hope return to Coronation Street to live with Fiz's brother Chesney Brown (Sam Aston). In February 2013, Fiz begins an affair with Tyrone Dobbs (Alan Halsall). When Tyrone's ex-fiancée Kirsty Soames (Natalie Gumede) eventually goes to prison for assaulting him, Tyrone and Fiz become a proper couple and Fiz and Hope move in with Tyrone and his and Kirsty's daughter Ruby Dobbs (Macy Alabi). In August 2015, Hope becomes ill. She is taken to the doctor who asks for an ultrasound scan to be done. After an MRI scan, Hope is diagnosed with neuroblastoma, a type of childhood cancer. Tyrone and Fiz are devastated. In February 2016, after Hope goes through chemotherapy and surgery, she is declared clear of cancer.

After Chesney is stabbed in the Bistro in July 2017, he becomes anxious and Chesney leaves Hope and Ruby on a bus in August 2017. Hope and Ruby are returned home safe and after Tyrone's initial anger, he forgives Chesney.

In December 2017, Hope began to display some disturbing behavioural problems, starting when she got into a fight with Ruby and set the trampoline on fire, which was blamed on Ruby, as Hope had planted a lighter into her possession. Ruby continued to receive the blame for Hope's misdemeanours. Fiz learned the truth when she caught Hope trying to force her cousin Joseph Brown to jump down the stairs. A few months later in September 2018, Tyrone's long-lost maternal grandmother Evelyn Plummer (Maureen Lipman) moved in with the family. Evelyn was a no-nonsense battleaxe who clashed with the troublemaking Hope, resulting in Hope sending Evelyn's dog away on a train. Knowing how serious her daughter's behaviour was, Fiz moved with her to a special school in Birmingham in December.

Fiz and Hope returned in August 2019, as it initially appeared that her behaviour had changed, only to learn that she had lost her place back at Bessie Street School as Tyrone had forgotten to enrol her, so they decide to homeschool her for the time being.

In 2019, Hope develops an obsession with fire. She frequently hides matches in her dolls and, at one point, lights a fire inside the construction site, indicating that the specialist unit had not helped her. Hope even goes so far as to light a fire in the garden. Fiz struggles to homeschool Hope, so asked her Birmingham support teacher Jade Rowan (Lottie Henshall) to move in as her tutor. Jade adapted well to living at No.9, but secretly spoiled Hope and tried to drive a wedge between her and her mother. Fiz soon discovers her hiding spots for the matches and break's Hope's tablet during a row. After this, Jade created false evidence that Hope was being physically abused by her parents. Although Jade was forced to move out when Hope regained her place at school, she gave Hope a secret phone to contact her with, and manipulated her way back into No.9 when she claimed to be homeless.

In January 2020, Jade dropped a bombshell on Hope – that they were half-sisters on their father's side. Jade continued to falsify evidence against Fiz, and social services were summoned, taking Hope and Ruby away while an investigation took place. Fiz and Tyrone learned the truth about Jade when she attempted to have the girls live with her, although she was refused as she was living with Fiz when the alleged abuse took place. Hope and Ruby were allowed to move back home when Fiz agreed to temporarily move out, and the evidence was eventually proven to be fabricated when Hope admitted that Jade had encouraged her to lie about injuries she had recently sustained, leading to the investigation being dropped.

Jade and Hope planned to run away to France together, but when Hope briefly went missing, Jade realised she needed to be returned to her parents. Hope continued to misbehave as she wasn't allowed to see Jade, so Fiz allowed her to see her sister in a limited capacity. However, in March when Jade made a pass at Tyrone, Hope saw how deceptive she was and sent her away.

Speaking of her casting, Flanagan said she read "a really fun script" in her audition and was "so excited" when she landed the role of Hope. She said the cast and crew are "lovely and friendly".

== Other characters ==
Character	Date(s)	Episode(s)	Actor	Circumstances
Ruth	8 January	7248	Caroline Woodruff	Weatherfield councillor who granted Peter Barlow (Chris Gascoyne) planning permission for his bar, much to the chagrin of his father Ken (William Roache) who petitioned her to deny Peter's proposal.
Jess Burrows	18 January	7254	Georgia May Foote	Jess was a girl who viewed the Platts' house with her parents when it was up for sale. When David Platt (Jack P. Shepherd) told her about the more extreme goings-on of the Street, they decided not to make an offer.
Gail's solicitor	15–25 March	7295–7301	Christina Baily	Solicitor who represents Gail McIntyre (Helen Worth) after her arrest for the death of husband Joe (Reece Dinsdale). In spite of her efforts, Gail is refused bail twice and forced to stay in prison for months. Gail's son Nick Tilsley (Ben Price) removes her from the case to get a better lawyer.
Kyle	9–11 April	7313–7314	Tachia Newall	Rosie Webster (Helen Flanagan) begins telling her family about her famous footballer boyfriend and hangs on his every word, even buying him expensive gifts. When she finally introduces Kyle to her father, Kevin (Michael Le Vell), he quickly recognises Kyle's voice from a burger stand he frequents. Kyle admits he works there as "fallen arches" have kept him from being a footballer. This leads to a furious Rosie dumping him.
Rory	9 July	7375	uncredited	Rory is the baby nephew of Eddie (Steve Huison) and Anna Windass (Debbie Rush). Anna's brother, Harry, goes abroad on holiday and leaves Rory with them. Eddie is seen pushing Rory around in a pram. It is, however, revealed that Rory is, in fact, Anna and Eddie's nephew, in a heated debate with the social worker.
Pastor	20–23 August; 5–15 November	7406–7409; 7462–7469	Chris Grahamson	The Pastor is seen leading the church choir (played by the Manchester Show Choir) when Sian Powers (Sacha Parkinson) and Sophie Webster (Brooke Vincent) join, so that they can continue to see each other after Sophie's parents banned her from seeing Sian after lying that they went to Southport to see Sian's mother, when, in fact, they went away to a music festival together. The Pastor leads the choir. When the Websters find no time to help Sophie, she visits the pastor, but her visit ends in disaster when she falls from the church roof onto a parked car. He informs the hospital and stays at her side. His help is received mixed, with Sophie and her father Kevin (Michael Le Vell), thanking him and Sian and Rosie having goes at him.
Bryony	23 August	7408–7409	Claire Biggs	Social workers' panel who interview Steve (Simon Gregson) and Becky McDonald (Katherine Kelly).
Ian Mackintosh	23 August	7408–7409	Malcolm Scates	Social workers' panel who interview Steve (Simon Gregson) and Becky McDonald (Katherine Kelly).
Kelvin	23 August	7408–7409	uncredited	Social workers' panel who interview Steve (Simon Gregson) and Becky McDonald (Katherine Kelly).
Victoria	23 August	7408–7409	uncredited	Social workers' panel who interview Steve (Simon Gregson) and Becky McDonald (Katherine Kelly).
Denise	23 August	7408–7409	uncredited	Social workers' panel who interview Steve (Simon Gregson) and Becky McDonald (Katherine Kelly).
Christopher	23 August	7408–7409	uncredited	Social workers' panel who interview Steve (Simon Gregson) and Becky McDonald (Katherine Kelly).
Ben Carrig	26 August	7410	Howard Gray	Ben Carrig is a pilot who Becky McDonald's (Katherine Kelly) sister Kylie Turner (Paula Lane) cleans for, Kylie pretends to be married to Ben and is living in his house while he is away at work. When Becky and Kylie are talking Ben returns home to find Becky in his kitchen, while Kylie has run out the back door, shortly followed by Becky when she realises what has happened.
Mr Jordan	27 August – 9 September	7411–7420	Colin McFarlane	Neurosurgeon who cares for Aadi Alahan (Zennon Ditchett) after he suffers from a head injury. He discusses the seriousness of Aadi's condition with his parents, Dev (Jimmi Harkishin) and Sunita Alahan (Shobna Gulati).
Javier	27 August	7412	Sebastien Torkia	Javier is the dancer hired for Hayley Cropper's (Julie Hesmondhalgh) hen party at the café, to dance with her. He is dressed as "Zorro" and does Latin dancing with Hayley. It is revealed as he leaves that he is doing the costume dancing as a favour to Sean Tully (Antony Cotton).
Janet Powers	27 September	7433–7434	Carol Starks	Wife of Vinnie Powers (Ian Dunn) and mother to Sian Powers (Sacha Parkinson).
Miriam	25 October; 1 June 2011	7453–7454; 7615	Debbie Chazen	A social worker who arrives to assess the living arrangements for Max Turner (Harry MvDermott). When she turns up, she isn't aware his mother Kylie Turner (Paula Lane) has gone on holiday to Ayia Napa and so her sister Becky McDonald (Katherine Kelly) impersonates her in an attempt to present a good impression in order to keep Max at The Rovers Return Inn. However, Miriam later returns when she is called by a colleague to assist in the case, and Becky's deceit is apparent. It is decided that Max be put into care temporarily.
Dimitri	28 October – 13 December	7455–7491	Sal Fawzi	Dimitri is the boyfriend of Kylie Turner (Paula Lane) whom she met abroad he can only say a few words in English.
Tram driver	6–8 December	7484–7486	Tom Burroughs	The driver of the tram that is derailed when a large explosion damages the viaduct at the end of Coronation Street. He slams on the brakes when the accident comes into view, but is too late to stop before the tram veers off the viaduct and crashes head-first into the Corner Shop, trapping Molly Dobbs (Vicky Binns) and her baby Jack. Still connected, a second carriage is lifted into the air and comes crashing down on the Kabin on the opposite side of the street, trapping Rita Sullivan (Barbara Knox). During the rescue operation, the driver is recovered from the rubble and rushed to hospital, leaving Norris Cole (Malcolm Hebden) surprised that he survived the crash. The explosion and the following crash claim four lives that night, as an unnamed taxi driver is trapped under rubble, Ashley Peacock (Steven Arnold) is crushed by falling debris, Molly dies from her injuries and Charlotte Hoyle (Becky Hindley) is murdered by John Stape (Graeme Hawley).
Dr Chadderton	13 December – 10 March 2011	7491–7552	Kate Bowes Renna	Doctor treating Fiz Stape's (Jennie McAlpine) premature baby Hope.
