= John Stape =

Fictional character from Coronation Street

- Coronation Street character
- Portrayed by: Graeme Hawley
- Duration: 2007–2011, 2022–2023
- First appearance: 6 May 2007
- Last appearance: 28 October 2011 (main appearance); 16 January 2023 (voice appearance)
- Introduced by: Steve Frost (2007); Kim Crowther (2008); Iain MacLeod (2022)
In-universe information
- Other names: Colin Fishwick
- Occupation: Teacher; Cafe worker Bookmaker
- Wife: Fiz Brown (2009–2011)
- Daughters: Jade Rowan; Hope Dobbs

John Stape is a fictional character from the ITV soap opera Coronation Street, played by Graeme Hawley. He made his first on-screen appearance during the episode airing on 6 May 2007. The character departed on 3 June 2011 after four years on the show. Hawley made a short return to Coronation Street from 21 October 2011 until 28 October 2011 when he was killed-off.

The character has been at the centre of some major storylines such as the kidnapping of local teenager Rosie Webster (Helen Flanagan), stealing the identity and covering up Colin Fishwick's (David Crellin) death from a heart attack, the manslaughter of Joy Fishwick (Doreen Mantle) and the murder of Charlotte Hoyle (Becky Hindley). The character was married to Fiz Brown (Jennie McAlpine) with whom he has a daughter called Hope. John Stape died in October 2011 after crashing his car into the back of a lorry, during a car chase with Kevin Webster (Michael Le Vell). In 2019, it was revealed that John has a daughter, Jade Rowan (Lottie Henshall).

Hawley reprised the role after 11 years in December 2022, although in the form of a recording made by John Stape prior to his death.

== Development ==
The character of John was created as a new love interest for established character Fiz Brown who was to split from her long term love interest Kirk Sutherland around whom most of her romance storylines were centred. It was shortly revealed thereafter that the character would feature in an affair plot with the character Rosie Webster, who was just over the legal age for sexual intercourse. The characteristics of John are a caring nature and the tendency to be charming to females. The actor said his character's personality and success with the female characters of the show is because of his charm: "He's a bit of a charmer and finds it easy to relax with them and be in their company. He has this disarming charm about him. He's a good listener and talks a lot. That's what they like about him, and he has this 'everyman' quality about him." He has revealed himself to be an atheist.

In March 2011, it was announced that John's storyline would conclude that summer with the character committing suicide, something that ultimately did not occur.

In August 2011, it was announced Hawley would be returning to Coronation Street in October for a short stint, with John kidnapping Rosie for a second time.

== Storylines ==
John is organising a school play rehearsal when he encounters his former girlfriend, Fiz Brown (Jennie McAlpine). John and Fiz begin dating. John starts tutoring Sally Webster (Sally Dynevor) in English Literature. He meets her teenage daughter, Rosie Webster (Helen Flanagan), and they begin a secret affair. The pair are almost caught together on several occasions and Fiz realises something is up with John. She wrongly accuses John and Sally of having an affair. John and Rosie's relationship is revealed on Christmas Day, after John mixes up Fiz and Rosie's presents. John is then attacked by Kevin Webster (Michael Le Vell). John is fired from his teaching job due to his relationship with Rosie. John gets a job at Street Cars and Fiz forgives him for cheating on her. John notices Rosie outside a nightclub one night and, blaming her for his misfortune, he kidnaps her. John locks Rosie in his grandmother's house for five weeks. Fiz comes to the house and finds Rosie, John is then arrested. He is sentenced to two years in prison.

Fiz learns John has been put on suicide watch after being diagnosed with depression and she goes to visit him. John decides to give Rosie £150,000 from his inheritance as a form of compensation. Fiz asks John to marry her and he accepts. They are married in the prison with Chesney Brown (Sam Aston) and Hayley Cropper (Julie Hesmondhalgh) as witnesses. John is later released from prison and moves in with Fiz. John is invited to his ex-colleague, Colin Fishwick's (David Crellin), leaving party. Colin explains that he is emigrating to Canada and is leaving the teaching profession. After being sacked from his job at an adult education centre, John decides to take Colin's identity and use it to start teaching again. Fiz agrees to go along with his plan and they keep it a secret from Chesney. Charlotte Hoyle (Becky Hindley) discovers what John is doing and she starts emotionally blackmailing him. John learns Colin is moving to Canada because he was having an affair with a married woman. The woman's husband tracks down John, thinking he is Colin and punches him. Fiz asks John to quit teaching and he agrees but decides to continue with the deception in secret.

Colin returns unexpectedly and confronts John and Charlotte. During an argument, Colin collapses and dies of a brain hemorrhage. John and Charlotte dispose of Colin's body in a hole in the floor of the Underworld factory. Fiz learns John is still teaching and threatens to leave him. She later tells John she is pregnant and John promises never to lie to her again. John is pursued by a stalker, who turns out to be Charlotte. She continues to blackmail him and John worries when she introduces him as her fiancé to her parents, Dorothy (Jean Fergusson) and Alan (Michael McStay). Colin's elderly mother, Joy (Doreen Mantle) comes looking for her son, but John tells her Colin has gone to Canada. John tells Charlotte that he has no intention of leaving Fiz for her. Charlotte gets angry and reaches for a hammer and swings it at John. He manages to wrestle it from her hands and as Charlotte goes to leave intent on finding Fiz and telling her about what she perceives as their relationship, John hits her. Believing her to be dead, John starts to call an ambulance but is distracted by the sound of an explosion. He leaves the house and discovers a tram has crashed onto the street. Fiz goes into labour early and John goes to the hospital with her. She gives birth to a girl, who John and Fiz name Hope.

John moves Charlotte's body out of the house and pretends to have found her in the wreckage of the tram. The paramedics find Charlotte's pulse and she is placed on a ventilator to help her breathe. However, John and her parents are told she will not regain consciousness due to heavy brain damage. They all decide to switch off the life support machine. John and Fiz worry for Hope when they learn she has a hole in her heart, which can be treated with medication. John begins visiting Joy and helping her with her shopping. John eventually confesses everything to Joy, who has an angina attack from the shock. Someone comes to the door and John panics and puts his hand over Joy's mouth to stop her screaming. Joy then dies and John leaves her house. John suffers a breakdown and is hospitalised. On his return, he holds his daughter for the first time and gets a job at the local betting shop. John stops taking his medication, but after learning Fiz has claimed Joy's inheritance fraudulently, he freaks out and barricades himself in his office. John disappears, but later returns and tells Fiz about how Charlotte was blackmailing him.

Chesney learns the truth about John's link to the Hoyle family and Dorothy realises John is not Colin. John takes all three of them hostage at the Hoyle's house. John tells Chesney's girlfriend Katy Armstrong (Georgia May Foote) that he has run away. John learns the factory floor is being dug up and he gets a job working for the local builder, Owen Armstrong (Ian Puleston-Davies). One night, John returns to the factory and digs up Colin's body. However, Fiz follows him and is horrified when John confesses that the body is Colin. Fiz reluctantly agrees to help dispose of the body in the canal. Fiz follows John to the Hoyle's house and finds Chesney, Dorothy and Alan tied up in the basement. The police are called and John flees. When Fiz refuses to run away with him, John takes Hope. John discovers Fiz was run over while she was chasing after him. He visits her in hospital and returns Hope to her. The police arrive and John jumps off the hospital roof and disappears.

A few months later, John returns to Weatherfield and kidnaps Rosie. John tells her he wants her to go to court and help Fiz, who has been arrested for the crimes he committed. John explains his version of events to Rosie and makes her recite them to him. Kevin and Jason Grimshaw (Ryan Thomas) eventually find John and Rosie and John takes off in his car. Kevin follows and John crashes his car. He is taken to the hospital and Fiz and Hope come to visit him. Fiz forgives John and tells him she loves him. John makes a statement to the police and then dies from his injuries.

== Reception ==
John was nominated in the category of "Villain of the Year" at the 2009 and 2011 British Soap Awards. Some of the viewing public became annoyed at one of the character's main storylines. Actor Graeme Hawley was blasted for his portrayal of the character stating that he gave the teaching profession a bad name. Hawley explained that: "I have bumped into a few teachers who haven't been happy with me," Graeme told the Daily Record. "They say, 'You know, we are not all like that.' And my answer to that is, 'I know at least three teachers who had affairs with their students when I was at school. You might not have done it, but don't tell me it doesn't happen.' "

The actor was asked if he was heckled a lot in real life by the viewing public during an interview with British Entertainment and Media website Digital Spy on which Graeme had to say: "There's been a lot of friendly banter really. It happens a lot in the street wherever I go. It's all good-natured, though. People are very complimentary about the storyline and character and asking when John was returning, so that's been lovely. It was nice to hear that people wanted to see more of John Stape back on the Cobbles."
