= Rosie Webster =

Fictional character from Coronation Street

- Coronation Street character
- Helen Flanagan as Rosie Webster (2017)
- Portrayed by: Emma Collinge (1990–1999); Helen Flanagan (2000–2018)
- Duration: 1990–2012, 2017–2018
- First appearance: Episode 3163; 24 December 1990
- Last appearance: Episode 9477; 8 June 2018
- Introduced by: Mervyn Watson (1990); Kate Oates (2017)
- Book appearances: Coronation Street: The Complete Saga
- Spin-off appearances: Coronation Street: Knights Tale (2010); Just Rosie (2011)
- Emma Collinge as Rosie Webster (1999)
In-universe information
- Occupation: Personal Assistant; Model; Reality TV Star; Game Show TV Presenter
- Father: Kevin Webster
- Mother: Sally Webster
- Stepfather: Tim Metcalfe
- Stepmother: Alison Webster; Abi Webster
- Sisters: Sophie Webster
- Half-brothers: Jake Webster; Jack Webster
- Grandfathers: Bill Webster; Eddie Seddon
- Grandmothers: Alison Webster; Elsie Seddon
- Aunts: Debbie Webster; Gina Seddon
- First cousins: Carl Webster
- Other relatives: Nicolette Seddon; Paul Seddon

Rosie Webster is a fictional character from the ITV soap opera Coronation Street. The character has been played by two actresses: Emma Collinge from 1990 to 1999, and Helen Flanagan from 2000 to 2012, and from 2017 to 2018.

Rosie is the eldest daughter of Kevin (Michael Le Vell) and Sally Webster (Sally Dynevor), older sister to Sophie Webster (Ashleigh Middleton, Emma Woodward, Brooke Vincent), and older half-sister to Jack Webster and deceased Jake Webster. Throughout her storylines, Rosie has been involved in various conflicts, including a rivalry with younger sister Sophie and being kidnapped by John Stape (Graeme Hawley). Additionally, Rosie has had aspirations of becoming a model, which has been a significant storyline for her character.

== Development ==
=== Casting ===
Rosie was initially played by child actress Emma Collinge. In January 2000, the press announced that Collinge would be departing the serial "to devote more time to gymnastics." "Budding actress" Helen Flanagan was recast in the role. Nine-year-old Flanagan, from Bolton, Greater Manchester, joined the soap on 23 January 2000. At the time, Flanagan told the media that she was "thrilled" with her casting. Flanagan discovered she had been chosen just a few days before Christmas Eve 1999, but was not permitted to reveal this to anyone for two weeks. In 2000, her mother Julia Flanagan commented, "She was really thrilled to get the part and she was bursting to tell people, but she just couldn't. The Coronation Street people had asked us not to tell anyone, so we had to keep quiet. The hardest bit for Helen was not telling her grandad because he's such a fan of the programme. When he did find out, he was absolutely thrilled. She is loving every minute. She's met most of the cast and is still very excited about it all."

In October 2011, it was announced that Flanagan had decided to leave Coronation Street. While some had speculated that she would quit the series due to panic attacks on set, Flanagan said it was purely her own decision to leave because she had played Rosie for more than half of her life and decided to pursue other projects. Flanagan said that she "disliked" playing Rosie. Speaking to the Sunday Mirror, Flanagan commented: "When I'm acting, I like things to feel real, and I didn't like Rosie's bitchiness. I didn't enjoy playing that kind of character. She went through a phase of being such a catty girl. As an actress you do the best job you can, but I didn't enjoy it because it didn't feel real. I always said to myself that I was going to leave when I turned 21. For me, the show represents my childhood, and I just couldn't have properly become an adult if I hadn't left."

On 10 July 2016, while appearing on an episode of Loose Women, Flanagan expressed interest in reprising her role as Rosie, but admitted that she would prefer to only appear in a few episodes due to being busy as a mum. On 5 October 2016, it was announced that Flanagan would be reprising her role as Rosie for a short stint in early 2017. Flanagan commented: "I'm so excited to be returning to Coronation Street and being part of the Webster family again." Producer Kate Oates said: "The Websters have missed Rosie and so have we. With Sophie away on holiday with her sister, it seemed like the ideal time to bring Rosie back home with her for a visit. We are delighted that Helen is as keen to explore what Rosie has been up to away from the cobbles as we are." On 9 February 2017, it was announced that Flanagan had extended her contract to play Rosie for the foreseeable future.

In December 2017, during an interview with OK! magazine, Flanagan revealed that she was pregnant with her second child and would take maternity leave at the beginning of 2018. Flanagan left the show in April, indicating an interest in returning to the role at a future, unspecified date.

=== Characterisation ===
Between 1990 and 2005, Rosie was portrayed as a typical child with her hair often tied up. However, in 2005, the character underwent a notable change in appearance, adopting a gothic style which included wearing black clothing and makeup, and dyeing her hair jet black. In 2008, Flanagan expressed her dislike for her character's gothic attire in an interview with The Mirror, stating, "I am used to being a goth, having dressed as one for so long as Rosie. It was all so unflattering - really unfeminine, with long black skirts that reached the floor and horrible jackets" Flanagan also commented on Rosie's attitude at the time, stating, "I hate all that goth music, such as Marilyn Manson and HIM, that Rosie seems to like. Her favorite rock band is called Stench of Death - that says it all."

Rosie’s appearance was again changed around 2007 to reflect changes to the character's behaviour. Speaking about her character's new appearance Flanagan said: "I like to look sexy, but not tarty. Luckily, I do pretty well as Rosie – she's a glamorous girl, kind of a sassy secretary, so it's all pencil skirts, which I love, and a lot of low-cut tops. I don't want people looking at my boobs or want to be known for my boobs, but Corrie is a family show so thankfully they never go too far with it." When asked if her character is driven by money, Flanagan said, "I think she's attracted to the power and money. Rosie knows that she can use her womanly wiles to get what she wants. In the long run, she wants a life away from Weatherfield. She wants to be rich when she's older and aspires to be like Carla – gorgeous, sexy and wearing designer clothes," adding "It's not wholly about the money. She's more driven by glamour and power." She also commented that her character, "can be a bit of a bitch but she does have a heart."

== Storylines ==
Rosie's birth was part of the Coronation Street Christmas storyline in 1990. She was the first baby born to long-running couple Kevin and Sally Webster. The character's name is taken from the fictional street she was born on, Rosamund Street. Rosie had fewer storylines until the breakdown of her parents' marriage following her father Kevin's affair with Natalie Horrocks (Denise Welch). She then went through a bullying phase at school and was transferred to Oakhill Grammar School. Following the discovery of an affair between her mother and Ian Davenport (Philip Bretherton), Rosie distanced herself from her mother and tried to blackmail her over the affair. Rosie subsequently went through a goth phase and began a relationship with Craig Harris (Richard Fleeshman). Sally disapproved of the relationship, leading to conflict and a nearly fatal car crash. While the Websters eventually became reconciled to Craig and Rosie's relationship, it ended when Rosie refused to elope to Berlin with Craig.

Rosie began summer work as a PA at Underworld, the neighbourhood underwear factory, before beginning studies for her A-Levels at Weatherfield High where she began a secret affair with teacher John Stape (Graeme Hawley). After it ended badly, John kidnapped Rosie on two separate occasions. Later, Rosie sold her story to the local papers and posed for photographs. Following his arrest for kidnapping, John asked Rosie to visit him in prison and gave her £150,000 in compensation. Rosie bought a sports car and shares of Underworld but, her ex-boyfriend Luke Strong (Craig Kelly) conned her out of most of the money. In response, Rosie tried to blackmail John for £50,000 from him, saying that she would claim he had attacked her again. When John refused to pay her, Rosie followed through on her threat, but ultimately failed and was forced to apologize and retract her statement to the police. Rosie then embarked on a career as a topless model, to the disapproval of her parents. She later received an opportunity to take part in a reality television series. Rosie broke off her relationship with live-in boyfriend Jason Grimshaw (Ryan Thomas) and left the show for London.

Five years later, Rosie returned to the street with Sophie. Rosie reveals to Sally that she is no longer modelling, and she and Sophie join their stepfather Tim Metcalfe's (Joe Duttine) window-cleaning business. She later got a job at Barlow Legal Services working as a personal assistant to Adam Barlow and Todd Grimshaw. Rosie left the street again in June 2018 after getting a job as a temporary job as a television presenter for a game show in Japan.

== Reception ==
In 2005, Rosie's gothic appearance caused controversy in real life, with Lancashire headteachers warning students against copying her style. One teacher even stated that "if pupils are inspired to go gothic after watching Coronation Street, then they will be breaching school rules."

The character's evolution over the years has been noted by various commentators. Jon Wise of The People described her as having transformed "from teenage Goth to saucy minx and superbitch" Flanagan's portrayal of Rosie has garnered attention from the public and critics alike, with the actress receiving nominations for several awards. She was nominated for "Villain of the Year" at the 2008 British Soap Awards and "Sexiest Female" in 2011. In 2014, Matt Bramford from What to Watch put Rosie on his list of the 18 best recastings in British and Australian soap operas, opining that Flanagan played Rosie "perfectly" and commenting, "Oh Rosie Webster, how we miss you mincing down the cobbles and attending low rent photo shoots". In August 2017, she was also longlisted for "Funniest Female" and "Sexiest Female" at the Inside Soap Awards, although she did not make it to the viewer-voted shortlist.

== See also ==
- List of soap opera villains
