= Fiz Brown =

Fictional character from Coronation Street

- Coronation Street character
- Portrayed by: Jennie McAlpine
- Duration: 2001–present
- First appearance: 20 April 2001
- Introduced by: Jane MacNaught
- Spin-off appearances: Coronation Street: Out of Africa (2008); Coronation Street: Text Santa Special (2013, 2015)
In-universe information
- Other names: Fiz Dobbs; Fiz Stape
- Occupation: Machinist; Café waitress; Café co-owner; Antiques dealer
- Mother: Cilla Battersby-Brown
- Adoptive father: Roy Cropper (foster)
- Adoptive mother: Hayley Cropper (foster)
- Stepfather: Les Battersby
- Brothers: Chesney Brown
- Half-brothers: Billy Brown
- Husband: John Stape (2009–2011); Phill Whittaker (2022); Tyrone Dobbs (2022–present)
- Daughters: Hope Dobbs
- Adoptive daughters: Ruby Dobbs
- Stepsons: Dorin Pop
- Nephews: Joseph Brown; Aled Winter-Brown; Bryn Winter-Brown
- Nieces: Carys Winter-Brown; Llio Winter-Brown

Fiz Brown (also Stape and Dobbs) is a fictional character from the British ITV soap opera Coronation Street. Played by Jennie McAlpine, the character first appeared on screen on 20 April 2001. Initially appearing for five episodes, McAlpine's contract was soon extended, and Fiz became a regular character. In May 2014, it was announced that McAlpine was expecting her first child, and Fiz temporarily departed on 14 November 2014, returning on 19 June 2015. In November 2017, McAlpine took a break from filming to take part in the 17th series of the ITV reality show I'm A Celebrity...Get Me Out of Here! and her exit aired on 18 December 2017. She returned on 2 March 2018. In April 2018, McAlpine announced that she was expecting her second child. She took maternity leave from the show on 5 December 2018 and returned on 30 August 2019. McAlpine took maternity leave a third time in 2023 and returned in March 2024.

Fiz initially appeared as a troubled teenager briefly fostered by Roy (David Neilson) and Hayley Cropper (Julie Hesmondhalgh) at the age of 16. She later started working at the Underworld factory. Fiz was involved in a murder storyline in which her husband John Stape (Graeme Hawley) committed three murders and had Fiz help him bury the bodies. She had to implicate other people to cover for John. She gave birth to her daughter Hope prematurely, in the live 50th anniversary episode with McAlpine becoming the first actress to act out a birth live on a soap opera.

== Creation ==
Fiz Brown as she appeared in 2001.

Fiz initially appeared as a troubled teenager briefly fostered by Roy (David Neilson) and Hayley Cropper (Julie Hesmondhalgh) at the age of fifteen. She leaves and then returns to Coronation Street, and starts working at the Underworld factory. Her nickname is presumably due to her distinctive afro-like hair; she was born as Fiona. Her mother, Cilla Battersby-Brown (Wendi Peters) and her little brother, Chesney Brown (Sam Aston) are introduced when they come to live on the street with Les Battersby (Bruce Jones). Fiz has a bad history with her mother, who has often left her in care and never prioritised her children.

The character first appears onscreen during the episode broadcast on 20 April 2001. The character of Fiz is a good-hearted young woman who has made many puzzling decisions and is often unlucky in love. Actress Jennie McAlpine stated that she would prefer the character to stay unlucky in love because she enjoys portraying the rowing and screaming that comes with it rather than seeing her character living happily ever after. Fiz's personality has undergone some rapid transformations over the years. Starting as a dopey teenage tearaway, she is now responsible for her younger brother, constantly trying to do the right thing by him and sometimes failing. When interviewed about this on the soap opera's official website, McAlpine stated: "I like Fiz, I think she is a good person. I know she does get it wrong sometimes, but she is just trying, she's just trying to get it all right, she doesn't always, but she does try." During the same interview, she then said: "Oh, Fiz has changed over the years. Luckily, she's changed because I don't think I'd be here if she hadn't,t because she started off being a pretty bad girl, actually, causing loads of trouble for Roy and Hayley."

== Development ==
In November 2012, The Sun newspaper reported that romance will blossom for the old flames as Fiz continues to support Tyrone Dobbs (Alan Halsall) through his domestic violence ordeal with girlfriend Kirsty Soames (Natalie Gumede). It was reported that Kirsty would deliberately cause injury to Fiz's hand. According to the Daily Star, Fiz would attempt to fix her machine at the factory when it breaks,s only to get her hand trapped when Kirsty switches the power back on. Fiz apparently needs emergency medical attention due to the bloody injury, and soon starts spreading the word that Kirsty harmed her on purpose. She is quoted as telling Tyrone: "Kirsty said she didn't do it, and you might believe her, but in your heart,d I don't think you do. What's she going to do next? She injured you, and now she's injured me. Who's going to be next, Ruby?" McAlpine spoke about the storyline and told What's On TV: "Kirsty continues to look after Fiz and stays with her while she is treated at the hospital and even returns home with her. She is quite sinister, and when she finally leaves, Fiz is quite shaken by Kirsty's behaviour. Fiz has now seen how scary Kirsty can be with her own eyes. Fiz is not soft. She has spent time in prison before, but she has now seen what Tyrone has to cope with when Kirsty gets angry." She added, "Fiz really cares about Tyrone. Fiz is also very stubborn and has a sense of justice. She will probably want to see this through to the end—she wants the truth to come out. She wants Tyrone to be happy and feels this can never be the case while he is still involved with Kirsty."

In an interview with The Mirror, McAlpine described her emotional scenes with Hawley (John Stape) as physically demanding: "It's been very draining. Not emotionally, because I never take my work home with me, but genuinely physically exhausting. It's tiring having to cry continuously, and I take a long time to recover from that. My face goes all red and my eyes sting for ages afterwards. I'm not a good crier!" She added, "I've always been a huge Corrie fan. Being a Northern girl, it was always on in my living room. And even today, I love sitting down and catching up with what's going on. This is my dream job."

McAlpine admitted that her wedding plans caused her to receive a mixed reaction from viewers. On This Morning, McAlpine revealed: "It has divided the nation—some people think she's absolutely mad. But it's funny, before I proposed and did that big thing with the banner, everyone was saying, 'Oh, I think you should marry him, and now I've decided on my own hands, I don't think they like it now. I think people aren't happy about it now. They liked the idea, but now they are worried." McAlpine added: "He didn't mean to do it for five weeks—he didn't mean to lock her up for that long, I know that. I do believe him."

== Storylines ==
Fiz first appears as a troubled sixteen-year-old fostered by Roy and Hayley Cropper. After clashing with them, she leaves their care, but later returns to Weatherfield, drops out of school, and starts work as a machinist at Mike Baldwin’s factory. Although she is initially dismissive of Roy and Hayley, she later recognises them as the only parental figures who truly care for her.

Fiz begins an on-off relationship with Tyrone Dobbs, but later dates Kirk Sutherland. She also becomes increasingly involved in caring for her younger brother, Chesney, after their mother, Cilla, neglects him. After Cilla and Les leave the area, Fiz moves into No. 5 with Kirk and Chesney.

Fiz later reconnects with her former boyfriend, John Stape, now a teacher at Weatherfield High School. She leaves Kirk and begins a relationship with John, but their relationship is damaged when John has an affair with his student, Rosie Webster. John later kidnaps Rosie, and Fiz ends the relationship after discovering the truth. Despite this, she eventually decides that she still loves him, and they marry in prison in September 2009.

After John is released, Fiz supports his return to Weatherfield, despite opposition from some residents. John later steals the identity of former colleague Colin Fishwick in order to teach again, and Fiz reluctantly agrees to keep his secret. She becomes pregnant and gives birth prematurely to their daughter Hope after being injured in the explosion at The Joinery.

John’s crimes gradually unravel, and Fiz becomes implicated after posing as Colin’s wife in connection with Joy Fishwick’s inheritance. After John flees, Fiz is arrested and charged in connection with the deaths linked to him. She is remanded in custody and struggles in prison while separated from Hope. At trial, she is found not guilty of the murders of Joy Fishwick and Charlotte Hoyle, but guilty of Colin Fishwick’s murder. John later gives a statement before dying from injuries sustained in a car crash, and Fiz eventually gains her release.

Fiz later becomes involved in Tyrone’s abusive relationship with Kirsty Soames. After discovering that Kirsty is attacking Tyrone, Fiz supports him, and the two begin an affair. Kirsty exposes their relationship before her wedding to Tyrone, then falsely accuses Tyrone of abusing her. She later admits the truth in court, and Tyrone is cleared.

Fiz is devastated when Hayley is diagnosed with terminal pancreatic cancer. After Hayley’s death in January 2014, Fiz supports Roy, although she initially reacts angrily when she learns that Hayley ended her own life.

In 2015, Fiz and Tyrone learn that Hope has neuroblastoma. Hope eventually recovers, but Fiz and Tyrone face financial difficulties after trying to give her a perfect Christmas during her illness.

In 2019, Hope’s behaviour leads to her being home-schooled by care worker Jade Rowan. Jade is later revealed to be John Stape’s daughter and manipulates Hope as part of a plan to take revenge on Fiz. Social services remove Hope and Ruby from Fiz and Tyrone’s home, but the allegations against Fiz are eventually dropped after Tyrone finds evidence of Jade’s manipulation.

In 2021, Tyrone admits that he is in love with Alina Pop, ending his relationship with Fiz. Fiz later meets Phill Whittaker and begins dating him. In 2022, Fiz and Phill marry, but she ends the marriage at the reception after realising that she still loves Tyrone. Fiz and Tyrone reconcile and marry later that year.

== Reception ==
For her role as Fiz, McAlpine was nominated for "Best Actress" at the 2007 Inside Soap Awards. In 2016, Laura-Jayne Tyler from Inside Soap criticised Fiz' constant "nagging", writing "We do like Fiz, but it was one of those weeks where were thankful for the volume button". In 2021, McAlpine was longlisted for "Best Actress" for the Inside Soap Awards for her role as Fiz.
