= Jean Fergusson =

British actress (1944–2019)

- Born: 30 December 1944; Wakefield, West Riding of Yorkshire, England
- Died: 14 November 2019 (aged 74); London, England
- Education: Royal Welsh College of Music & Drama
- Years active: 1964–2016

Jean Fergusson (30 December 1944 – 14 November 2019) was a British television and theatre actress, who was best known for playing the part of Marina on the British situation comedy Last of the Summer Wine from 1985 until it was cancelled in 2010, and her several guest roles in the soap Coronation Street.

== Early life ==
Fergusson was born in the village of Woolley, near Wakefield, to Margaret (née Jackson) and Francis Fergusson, a civil engineer. They moved several times between Yorkshire and Dumfriesshire, Scotland before settling in Bridgend, Glamorgan in 1956 where Fergusson attended Bridgend Girls' Grammar School. While studying for her A-levels, she joined an amateur dramatics company, the Bridgend Castle Players, then trained as an actor at Cardiff College of Music and Drama (now the Royal Welsh College of Music & Drama) and graduated in 1965.

== Career ==
After touring schools with Brian Way’s Theatre Centre company, she spent two years in rep at Oldham Coliseum, followed by engagements in theatres all over the country.

In 1974, Fergusson made her television debut with a few episodes in popular soap Crossroads playing Caroline Herbert, an old girlfriend of main character Roy Mollison, and appeared as Mrs Tremayne, a colonel’s wife, in an episode of All Creatures Great and Small four years later in 1978. In theatre, she appeared in the stage show of popular long running sitcom Last of the Summer Wine in the 1984 summer season, playing Marina, an ageing blonde bombshell complete with peroxide blonde hair, false eyelashes and short skirt. The character was so popular with audiences that Marina was written into the television series, and she made her first appearance in 1985, and continued to play the character in every episode until the show's cancellation in 2010, appearing in a total of 216 episodes.

Fergusson's show She Knows You Know!, in which she portrayed the comedian Hylda Baker, performed at the Vaudeville Theatre, was nominated for a 1998 Laurence Olivier Theatre Award for Best Entertainment of the 1997 season, and she was part of the cast of the touring play Seven Deadly Sins Four Deadly Sinners. After Last of the Summer Wine ended, Fergusson appeared in several television series, including This is England '86 and three episodes of Doctors. In 2010 she took on the role of Dorothy Hoyle in Coronation Street, having previously played Gary Mallet's mother in 1999 and Dr Lowther's sister-in-law Helen Ashcroft in 1987. She reappeared in 2011, and was part of a large kidnapping storyline involving her husband Alan, John Stape and Chesney Battersby-Brown.

== Personal life ==
Fergusson lived in Yorkshire until 2014, when she moved to London. She died at her home on 14 November 2019. Her partner of 30 years, Paul Jenkinson died in 2011.

== Filmography ==
Year	Title	Character
1974	Crossroads	Caroline Herbert
1978	All Creatures Great and Small	Mrs. Tremayne
1985	A Woman of Substance	Unknown
1985	The Practice	Joyce Tibbs; 4 episodes
1985–2010	Last of the Summer Wine	Marina; 216 episodes
1986	Albion Market	Unknown
1987	Coronation Street	Helen Ashcroft
1993	Lipstick on Your Collar	Dance Instructor
1999	Coronation Street	Mrs. Mallett
2001	Peak Practice	Mary Newson
2006	Doctors	Brenda Wallis
2010	This Is England '86	Daisy
2010–2011	Coronation Street	Dorothy Hoyle; 24 episodes
2011	Doctors	Rose Saunders
2012	Run for Your Wife	Exercising Woman
2013	Doctors	Meg Baker
