= Becky Hindley =

English actress

Rebecca Hindley (born 11 August 1965) is an English television, stage and radio actress based in Lancaster, England. She is best known for her eight-month stint in Coronation Street as Charlotte Hoyle in 2010; her performance as the deranged bunny boiler was met with praise by the soap's producer Phil Collinson and her co-stars Jennie McAlpine and Graeme Hawley. Charlotte Hoyle was actually the third character Hindley had played in the soap, as she had made two previous guest appearances, in 2006 and 2007.

Hindley's other television appearances include The Bill, Holby City and Casualty. Her work on radio includes Anne in an adaptation of The Remains of Day and, most recently, Denise in The Disappearance by Peter Whalley for the BBC Radio 4 Afternoon Play slot, alongside fellow former Coronation Street star Joanne Froggatt. Until May 2011 played the role of Gertrude in a production of Hamlet in Staffordshire, in collaboration between the Northern Broadsides and the New Vic.

Hindley reads the Jessica Daniel series of audiobooks, written by Kerry Wilkinson and produced by AudioGo.
