= David Crellin =

English actor

- Born: David Crellin; 1961 (age 64–65); Sheffield, South Yorkshire, England, UK
- Occupation: Actor

David Crellin (born 1961) is an English actor.

Crellin, who was born in Sheffield, South Yorkshire, is known for roles in Emmerdale as Billy Hopwood, BBC 2's BAFTA Award-winning series The Cops as Alan Wakefield, and Coronation Street as gangster Jimmy Clayton, charge nurse Thornton who looked after Don Brennan after his car crash, and receiver Graham Baxter who wound up MVB Motors. He also starred as Jimmy Grainger in the first series of Waterloo Road on BBC One.

Signed to British independent record label Everyday Records 2008, Crellin recorded a debut EP Innocent Bystander. In 2010 he returned to Coronation Street in another role; that of Colin Fishwick, a teacher friend of John Stape. David trained to become an actor at the Rose Bruford College of Speech & Drama.

Crellin lives with his wife and children in Horwich, Bolton.

== Filmography ==
=== Film ===
Year	Title	Role	Notes
1996	Hillsborough	Tony Edwards	TV film
1999	Heart	Patient	
1999	The Darkest Light	Mike	
2001	Vacuuming Completely Nude in Paradise	Mr. Ron	TV film
2002	Blood Strangers	Nick Beresford	TV film
2002	It's Your Movie	Tommy	
2004	Yasmin	Detective	
2006	The Girls Who Came to Stay	Paul	TV film
2006	What We Did on Our Holiday	Len Fegurson	TV film
2006	Mysterious Creatures	David Kirwan	TV film
2009	Sacrifice	Simon	Short Film
2011	Bare Stage	Ben	Short Film
2013	Rock and Roll Fuck 'n' Lovely	House Guy	
2014	Robert and Rob	Doctor	Short Film
2014	On in Five	Postman	Short Film
2018	Underwater	Steve	Short Film

=== Television ===
Year	Title	Role	Notes
1993	Stay Lucky	Workman One	Episode – "Blowing Bubbles"
1993	Cracker	Quinian	Episode – "The Mad Women in the Attic"
1995	Band of Gold	Ashley	2 episodes
1997	Where the Heart Is	Police Officer	Episode – "Summoned by Bells"
1997	The Grand	Stanley	Episode – 1.6
1997–1998, 2003, 2007	Emmerdale	Billy Hopwood	65 episodes
1998–2001	The Cops	Wakefield	17 episodes
2000	Clocking Off	Trevor Piper	Episode – "Trudy's Story"
2000	Always and Everyone	Mr Phipps	Episode – 2.8
2001	Merseybeat	Ronnie Johnson	Episode – "Deep End"
2001	Bob and Rose	Taxi Driver	Episode – 1.1
2002	Dalziel and Pascoe	Bob Barnes	Episode – "For Love Nor Money"
2002–2004	Fat Friends	Steve McGary	2 episodes
2002–2008	Heartbeat	DI Harry Rankin	4 episodes
2003	Holby City	Andrew Murray	Episode – "On the Inside"
2004	North & South	Slickson	2 episodes
2004	The Bill	Guy Marsh	Episode – "211"
2005	Taggart	Iain Redman	Episode – "Puppet on a String"
2005	Coronation Street	Jimmy Clayton	11 episodes
2006	Waterloo Road	Jimmy Grainger	4 episodes
2007	The Bill	Eddie Coulson	Episode – "486"
2009	Doctors	PC Andy Woods	1 Episode
2009	Paradox	Don Barclay	1 Episode
2010	Coronation Street	Colin Fishwick	7 episodes
2011	Doctors	Kevin Latham	1 Episode
2012	Doctors	Joe Arnold	1 Episode
2012	Shameless	Shawy	Episode – "The world of Burger"
2012	Accused	Doctor Doran	Episode – "Stephen's Story"
2015	Home Fires	WAEC Official	2 episodes
2016	Moving On	Simon	Episode "Our House"
2017	Doctors	DCI Mike Seddon	1 Episode
2018	Doctors	Greg Griffiths	1 Episode
2019	Years and Years	Stan Thomas	Episode 2
