= Jennie McAlpine =

English actress (born 1984)

- Born: Jennie Elizabeth McAlpine; 12 February 1984 (age 42); Bury, Greater Manchester, England
- Occupations: Actress; comedian; businesswoman
- Years active: 1997–present
- Spouse: Chris Farr (m. 2017)
- Children: 3

Jennie Elizabeth McAlpine (born 12 February 1984) is an English television actress, comedian and businesswoman. She is known for her roles as Michelle Morley in Emmerdale and Fiz Brown in the ITV soap opera Coronation Street. She also took part in the seventeenth series of I'm a Celebrity...Get Me Out of Here! in 2017, where she finished in fourth place.

== Early life ==
McAlpine was born and grew up in Bury. She is of Scottish and Irish descent, with a grandfather from County Kerry and a grandmother from County Sligo. As a young girl, she used to put on shows on the patio for the neighbours, charging them 50 pence apiece. She did song and dance routines, copying groups like Bananarama.

Her father, Thomas McAlpine, worked in mental health and was awarded the OBE for services to mental healthcare; he died in March 2017. With his encouragement, she took up amateur dramatics at the age of eight, when father and daughter appeared together in a pantomime by the Bury Parish Players. She was the fairy and he was the dame. As a teenager, she joined the Carol Godby Theatre Workshop. McAlpine's parents separated when she was young, after which she lived with her father. She has one brother.

== Career ==
In 1997, at the age of 13, she entered a Young Comedian of the Year competition run by Fanta and came second in the final at the Comedy Store in London. Jennie entered the competition again in 1998, also finishing second. From 1997 to 2001, she performed as a stand-up comedian at charity nights, galas, and pub nights in and around Bury with her father. McAlpine played Michelle Morley in Emmerdale from 1999 to 2000. After leaving school, she enrolled at her local college, Holy Cross, and began studying for her A-levels. At the age of 17 she auditioned for the part of Fiz Brown on Coronation Street, a role she has played since 2001. McAlpine auditioned for the role with her arm in a sling, after dislocating her shoulder in a fall two days earlier. She was originally hired for five episodes, and went back to studying for her A-levels and working part-time in Boots The Chemist.

In November and December 2016, McAlpine covered for Becky Want on BBC Radio Manchester. In 2017, McAlpine was confirmed to be taking part in season 17 of I'm a Celebrity...Get Me Out of Here!. She finished in 4th place after spending 21 days in the jungle.

In December 2020, she became the voice of the new Burnley Bus Company Witchway buses running between Burnley, Rawtenstall and Manchester, providing onboard information and next stop announcements on the route.

== Personal life ==
McAlpine married Chris Farr, a restaurant manager, in 2017. The couple have been together since 2005. On the subject of her Scottish ancestry, and famous red hair she said:

I'm very proud of my Scottish roots and definitely love coming up to Scotland. When I'm in England I really stand out because of my red hair but when I come up to Scotland I feel normal because there are so many people with my colouring. I definitely feel different having red hair, but in a good way. Even though I may sound it, I am no way English. My granddad Alan was Scottish and my grandmother was Irish. My other granddad was born in England but his parents were Scottish.

McAlpine gave birth to her first child in 2014. In 2018, she announced that she was pregnant with her second child, and gave birth to the child the same year. In 2023, McAlpine gave birth to her third child named "Doris".

== Other projects ==
Since the age of 17, McAlpine has devoted her spare time to helping deprived children in Egypt through the Thebes Project in Luxor. She has also opened a restaurant in Manchester city centre, Annie's, with her husband Chris Farr. The restaurant serves modern British cuisine.

== Filmography ==
Year	Title	Role	Notes
1999–2000	Emmerdale	Michelle Morley	3 episodes
2001–present	Coronation Street	Fiz Brown	Regular role
2008	Coronation Street: Out of Africa	Fiz Brown	Direct-to-video
2010	The Door	Contestant	2 episodes
2010, 2015, 2017	Loose Women	Guest panellist	3 episodes
2017	I'm a Celebrity...Get Me Out of Here!	Contestant	Series 17
2019–2020	Supermarket Sweep	Voiceover	Game show

=== Game show appearances ===
- Who Wants to Be a Millionaire? (16 August 2008) – won £50,000 for charity
- The Cube (2 January 2011) – won £1,000 for Mood Swings
- All Star Family Fortunes (11 September 2010)
- The Chase (16 September 2012) – won £15,750 for Mood Swings
- All Star Mr & Mrs (22 May 2013)
- Tipping Point: Lucky Stars (28 July 2013) – won £6,700 for Mood Swings
- Pointless Celebrities (30 November 2013)
- All Star Family Fortunes (28 December 2013) – on the Coronation Street team, won £30,000 for Mood Swings and The Albert Kennedy Trust
- Countdown (8 – 12 February 2016) – Dictionary Corner
- You're Back in the Room (9 April 2016)
- Rolling In It (8 August 2020)
- Richard Osman's House of Games (2022)

== Awards and nominations ==
Year	Award	Category	Result	Ref.
2002	The British Soap Awards	Best Newcomer	Nominated	
2002	TV Quick Awards	Best Soap Newcomer	Nominated	
2007	Inside Soap Awards	Best Actress	Nominated	
2008	14th National Television Awards	Serial Drama Performance	Nominated	
2011	TV Choice Awards	Best Soap Actress	Nominated	
2013	The British Soap Awards	Best Actress	Shortlisted	
2013	The British Soap Awards	Best On-Screen Partnership (shared with Alan Halsall)	Nominated	
2021	Inside Soap Awards	Best Actress	Nominated	
2022	I Talk Telly Awards	Best Soap Partnership (shared with Halsall)	Nominated	

== See also ==
- List of I'm a Celebrity...Get Me Out of Here! (British TV series) contestants
