= Graeme Hawley =

English actor

- Born: 28 November 1973 (age 51); Coventry, England
- Occupation: Actor
- Years active: 1990–present
- Spouse: Elianne Byrne (m. 2008)
- Children: 2

Graeme Hawley (born 28 November 1973) is an English actor. He is best known for his roles as Dave then as DC Martin Crowe in Emmerdale and John Stape in the British soap Coronation Street.

== Career ==
Hawley graduated from Manchester Metropolitan University in 1996 with a degree in drama, before beginning his acting career in the theatre.

He started his career off by performing on stage at the Concordia Theatre, Hinckley, Leicestershire whilst learning the craft of acting with Priscilla Morris at the Hinckley Speech & Drama Studio (HSDS). His credits have so far included police officer Martin Crowe in ITV's Emmerdale, as well as roles in Shameless (Channel 4) and A Touch of Frost (ITV). He played John Stape in the long-running soap opera Coronation Street from March 2007 to January 2008, and then returned to the role in June 2008, but then left again. Hawley once again reprised the role in March 2009. On 28 October 2011, his character died after confessing to causing the death of three other people - Colin Fishwick, Charlotte Hoyle and Joy Fishwick.

On 29 May 2012, it was announced that Hawley would be playing the role of Satan in the York Mystery Plays 2012. The plays were staged during August that year. The same month, he also appeared as Dave Tandy in the sitcom In with the Flynns.

== Personal life ==
Hawley is married and has two children; a daughter born in 2009 and a son in 2011.

== Filmography ==
| Year | Programme | Role | Other notes |
|---|---|---|---|
| 1990-1992 | Kappatoo | Steve Williams | |
| 1993 | Brookside | DI Kent | |
| 1998 | The Cops | Maxwell | |
| 1998 | Coronation Street | Policeman | |
| 1998 | Emmerdale | Dave | |
| 1999 | A Touch of Frost | RCS Detective | |
| 2001 | Coronation Street | Desmond Worthing | |
| 2001 | Doctors | Jim Piper | |
| 2001 | Strumpet | Producer | |
| 2002 | The Forsyte Saga | Gradman | |
| 2003 | Born and Bred | Mr. Burton | |
| 2004–2006 | Emmerdale | DC Martin Crowe | |
| 2005 | The Royal | Arthur Graham | |
| 2005 | The Stepfather | Detective | |
| 2006 | Shameless | Troy Lawson | |
| 2007–2011, 2022–2023 | Coronation Street | John Stape | Nominated for Villain of the Year at the British Soap Awards 2009; Main Role (2007-2011); Voice appearance (2022) |
| 2008 | Doctors | Barry Partridge | |
| 2011 | Loose Women | Himself | |
| 2012 | In with the Flynns | Dave Tandy | |
| 2013 | Love and Marriage | Martin Paradise | |
| 2014 | Casualty | Sean Powell | |
| 2015 | Home Fires | Nigel Hughes | |
| 2017 | Peaky Blinders | Niall Devlin | |
| 2018 | Benidorm | Simon superfan | |
| 2020 | Father Brown | Peter Bailey | Episode 8.6 "The Numbers of the Beast" |
| 2021 | Finding Alice | Graham Napely | |
| 2021 | The Mallorca Files | Alan Bull | |
| 2021 | Stephen | DS Richard 'Tricky' Dixon | |
| 2022 | Meet the Richardsons | Bob | |
| 2022 | Red Rose | Dave Banister | |
| 2022 | Ridley | Daniel Preston | |
| 2024 | Doctors | Jason Chapman | 2 episodes |
| 2025 | Vera | Will Marsh | |
| ? | Heartbeat | Andy Morgan | |
| ? | Bernard's Watch | David Cobham | |
| ? | Always and Everyone | Ian Knox | |
| ? | Legless | Matt Greenhalgh | |

== Theatre ==
| Year | Title | Role | Director | Theatre |
|---|---|---|---|---|
| 2025 | Abigail's Party | Laurence | Natalie Abrahami | Royal Exchange Theatre |
| 2017 | Our Town | Mr Webb | Sarah Frankcom | Royal Exchange Theatre |
| 2015 | Hangmen | Bill | Matthew Dunster | Royal Court Theatre |
| 2012 | Guinea Pig Club | Archibald McIndoe | ------ | York Theatre Royal |
| 2012 | York Mystery Plays | Satan | Paul Burbridge & Damian Cruden | York Museum Gardens |
| 2012 | Saturday Night and Sunday Morning | Jack | Matthew Dunster | Royal Exchange Theatre |
| 2009 | Angels with Manky Faces | escaped convict | ? | Manchester's Library Theatre |
| ? | Rock n Roll | Jan | Chris Honer | Manchester Library |
| ? | Rosencrantz & Guildenstern Are Dead | Guildenstern | Chris Honer | Manchester Library Theatre |
| 2006 | Love And Money | Paul | Matthew Dunster | Royal Exchange Theatre/Young Vic |
| ? | Cloud:Burst | Dominic | Chris O'Connell | Theatre Absolute |
| ? | Street Trilogy | Reuben/Gary | Mark Babych | Theatre Absolute |
| ? | Little Malcolm & His Struggle Against The Eunuchs | | Mark Babych | Octagon Theatre, Bolton |
| ? | Traffic And Weather | Chris | Nick Moss | Manchester Library/Homegrown |
| ? | Schweyk In The Second World War | | Chris Honer | Manchester Library |
| ? | Howie The Rookie | The Rookie | Martin Harris | Rocket Theatre |
| ? | Raw | Addy | Mark Babych | Theatre Absolute |
| ? | Measure for Measure | Froth | Chris Honer | Manchester Library |
| ? | Hidden Markings | Howard | Nick Moss | Manchester Library/Homegrown |
| ? | Romeo and Juliet | Mercutio | Tom Scott | Suffolk Eye |
