= Michelle Connor =

Fictional character from Coronation Street

- Coronation Street character
- Portrayed by: Kym Marsh
- Duration: 2006–2019
- First appearance: Episode 6262; 3 April 2006
- Last appearance: Episode 9964; 27 December 2019
- Introduced by: Steve November
- Crossover appearances: East Street (2010)
In-universe information
- Occupation: Barmaid; Factory manager; Pub landlady; Events planner; Restaurant co-owner
- Father: Barry Connor
- Mother: Helen Connor
- Brothers: Paul Connor; Liam Connor
- Husband: Steve McDonald (2015–2017)
- Sons: Ali Neeson; Ruairi McDonald
- Adoptive sons: Ryan Connor
- Stepdaughters: Amy Barlow
- Nephews: Paul Connor Jr. Liam Connor Jr.
- First cousins: Tom Kerrigan
- Other relatives: Carla Connor; Aidan Connor; Kate Connor; Johnny Connor; Susie Price

Michelle Connor is a fictional character from the British ITV soap opera Coronation Street, played by former Hear'Say singer Kym Marsh. The character first appeared on-screen during the episode airing on 3 April 2006. Marsh took maternity leave in January 2011, and the character returned on 3 November 2011. On 24 February 2019, it was announced that Marsh would be leaving the soap after 13 years and Michelle's final episode aired on 27 December 2019.

Michelle's storylines have included a on/off relationships with Steve McDonald (Simon Gregson) during which he had an affair with future wife Becky (Katherine Kelly); discovering that her son Ryan (Ben Thompson) was not her own and had been swapped at birth with Alex Neeson (Dario Coates/James Burrows); the death of her eldest brother Paul (Sean Gallagher) in 2007; and the murder of her other brother Liam (Rob James-Collier) in 2008. Other storylines have focused on the friendships and feuds with her sisters-in-laws, Carla (Alison King) and Maria (Samia Ghadie) and Carla's brother Rob Donovan (Marc Baylis); her failed engagement to Ciaran McCarthy (Keith Duffy); surviving a minibus crash caused by Steve; becoming pregnant with Steve's baby and delivering their stillborn son, Ruairi, before learning that Steve has also impregnated Leanne Battersby (Jane Danson); and divorced from Steve, a relationship with Robert Preston (Tristan Gemmill); being kidnapped and stalked by her ex-boyfriend Will Chatterton (Leon Ockenden); getting shot by Pat Phelan (Connor McIntyre) on the day of her wedding to Robert and being terrorised by Ronan Truman (Alan McKenna). History later repeated itself when Robert impregnated Vicky Jefferies (Kerri Quinn) behind Michelle's back.

== Creation ==
=== Casting ===
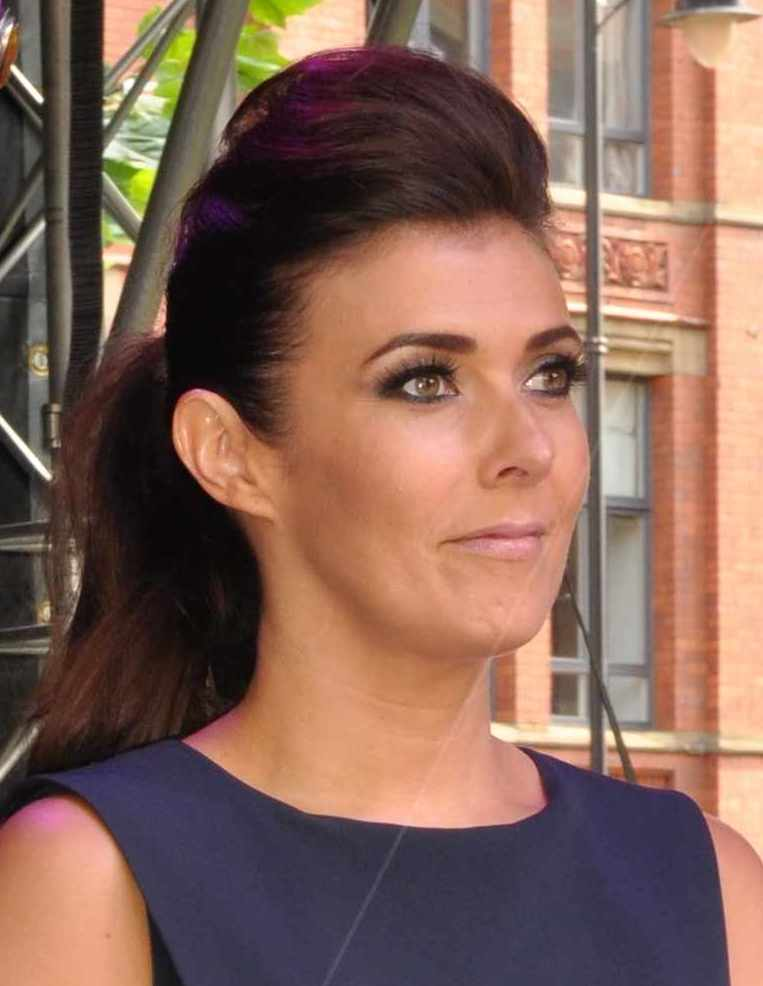
The character of Michelle was originally created as a guest character for Kym Marsh (pictured) to play, before she appeared permanently for thirteen years.

The character of Michelle was first created as a cameo appearance for singer/actress Kym Marsh with the possibility of returning. She was later signed up to return on a more permanent basis. Of the decision to become a regular on the show, Marsh said: "If anybody had told me I'd end up starring in Coronation Street one day, I'd have laughed and told them to shut up. I've always said this would be my dream job. My mum has watched the show for years so I've grown up with it." In June 2008, Marsh signed a contract for £100,000 after keen producers nearly doubled her salary to keep her as part of the show. Marsh stated she wanted to be on the show for a long time.

Inside Soap announced that a Coronation Street spokesperson had denied reports that Kym Marsh is leaving the show to go to Hollywood. Despite confirmation that her boyfriend Jamie Lomas is heading to LA, Kym will be staying put. With Kym confirming herself that she had just signed another one-year contract. Of the decision to stay, Marsh said: "I am absolutely delighted about it. It's not necessarily always my decision. I mean, if the producers don't want you, you're out. I'm lucky the writers feel that they can still write for my character, Michelle Connor, after doing so for three years." Marsh said she is unsure about her future in Coronation Street. Speaking to PA, Marsh said that she is unsure of what plans producers have for her and that she will have to wait until 2012 to see what happens. She said she would like to stay and added that she is excited to see how the story develops for her character.

=== Characterisation ===
Michelle's character has a multi-faceted personality. Of this actress, Kym Marsh said: "The good thing about playing a character like her, she's got so many sides. She can be a bitch, she can be sensitive and she can be feisty too. She's just so well-rounded – there's plenty more mileage left in her." Marsh also discussed her character's personality during an interview with Inside Soap, stating that she thinks her character has a more devious side because she is part of the Connor family. Going on to say that her character has got quite a temper on her and that she enjoys portraying her tough side.

During a magazine interview, Marsh spoke about the effect her relationship with Steve had on her character stating: "I'd like to see a lot more of the old, feisty Michelle. She became a bit too dependent on Steve and now she is an independent woman again I think she needs a bit of a challenge." Of her character's relationship with Peter, Marsh stated: "I think it might be interesting to see where things might go with Peter Barlow. Peter's quite a deep character. He's got a lot of layers, some good and some bad." Going on to comment about wanting her character to be more feisty unlike when she was with Steve explaining: "I think she is suited to Peter because there's bound to be drama. He's not exactly got the best track record."

== Development ==
=== Maternity leave ===
On 5 December 2008, Kym Marsh announced that she and boyfriend Jamie Lomas were expecting a baby. She was due to go on maternity leave in June 2009 and return at the beginning of 2010. On 12 February 2009, Marsh's son was born 18 weeks early and died shortly after birth. Marsh's second pregnancy was announced in 2010 and she took maternity leave in January 2011. It was confirmed in July 2011 that she would return to filming in September 2011. Upon her return in November 2011, Michelle announced that she was engaged to Ciaran, she learns of Carla's rape ordeal culminating in confronting Frank and taking charge of Underworld.

=== Steve McDonald ===
In January 2015, it was revealed that Michelle would reunite Steve McDonald (Simon Gregson) in the aftermath of the upcoming minibus crash storyline. It was also confirmed that Michelle and Steve would be the next Weatherfield couple to tie the knot. Speaking of this Marsh said; "I'm delighted, absolutely delighted. It'll be weird after being Michelle Connor for nearly nine years, but it totally makes sense for us as characters. Simon and I love working together, and nobody likes to see us broken up." It was also revealed that Michelle would get "feisty" again when her Steve is blamed for the mini-bus crash.

Kym Marsh also revealed that Michelle and Steve's mum Liz would clash over the best course of action for Steve. With Michelle now focused solely on helping Steve to get better with his depression following their reconciliation, she faces opposition from his mum Liz as it becomes apparent that they have very different approaches. While Liz adopts a "tough love" approach with her son, Michelle thinks they should tread more carefully around him, worried about his vulnerable state. Marsh said: "They both obviously want to help Steve but because both of them are so worried about him and love him so much - they both want to help him in their own way. Understandably they clash as they're both so concerned about him. They both have different approaches - Liz is more of the tough love approach and tries to get Steve up and doing things, whereas Michelle is much more trying the softly-softly approach." Marsh added: "Liz doesn't think it's the best way because Michelle is so protective of Steve and doesn't want to hurt or upset him. After everything that's happened with the crash, Michelle thinks they should go easy on him." Despite the disagreement, Marsh believed that the pair would be able to put their differences aside eventually in order to work together to help Steve.

=== Departure (2019) ===
In February 2019, it was announced that Marsh would be leaving the soap after 13 years. Kym said "When I was lucky enough to be offered four episodes on Coronation Street I could never in my wildest dreams have thought I'd be here 13 years later. "It's been an incredibly difficult decision but it feels like the right time for me to take a break from the show and explore some other roles. "But this isn't the last you've heard of Michelle Connor, she'll be back! I can't wait to see what the writers have in store for the future." A statement from Executive producer John Whilston said "We will be really sad to lose her when she goes but totally understand that, after dedicating herself to the show for so long and so brilliantly, she now fancies trying something else for a while. We, and the audience, thank her and wish her well". Marsh made her on-screen departure on 27 December 2019.

== Storylines ==
Michelle auditions as a background singer for Vernon Tomlin's (Ian Reddington) band and also gets a job as a barmaid at The Rovers Return Inn. She is soon joined by her son, Ryan Connor (Ben Thompson), and her brothers, Paul (Sean Gallagher) and Liam Connor (Rob James-Collier). It is established that Michelle had Ryan when she was a teenager and that Ryan's father, Dean, was killed in a car accident five years prior, when Ryan was 9 years old. Steve McDonald (Simon Gregson) falls for Michelle immediately but his mother, Liz McDonald (Beverley Callard), does not approve of Michelle as Vernon is clearly attracted to her.

When Paul's wife, Carla Connor (Alison King) hints that Paul and Liam have a secret, she confronts them. Paul denies it but Liam admits that Paul actually drove on the night Ryan's father died, not him. She lashes out violently at Paul and Liam for hiding Paul's crime and struggles to forgive them but does keep the truth from Ryan. After having a brief fling with Steve, Michelle begins dating Sonny Dhillon (Pal Aron) but ends it after discovering he is bisexual and having an affair with Sean Tully (Antony Cotton). Devastated, Michelle ends her friendship with Sean.

In December 2007, Ryan is followed repeatedly by a man in a blue car. He appears constantly and scares Ryan, who tells Michelle, but initially, the claims fall on deaf ears. The driver starts a conversation with him, using his name. Ryan, frightened, flees to the Rovers and tells Michelle and Liam. Liam tries to catch the mystery man but he escapes. He reappears several days later and goes to a house in the suburbs. Michelle, Liam and Ryan follow, determined to find out why this man is following Ryan. Michelle rings the doorbell and the door is answered by another 15-year-old, Alex Neeson (Dario Coates). She is horrified to see that Alex is the image of her late partner. Her worst fears are confirmed – Alex and Ryan were swapped accidentally just after birth, making Alex Michelle's biological son, not Ryan. Alex later appears in The Kabin and tells Norris Cole (Malcolm Hebden) that Michelle would pay for the sweets he wanted. Norris asks who his mother is and Alex tells him his mother is Michelle. Later that day, news spreads about Ryan not being Michelle's son and Ryan is not amused when Amber Kalirai (Nikki Patel) comments on it. The police later arrive at The Rovers with Alex. He has been shoplifting and tells them Michelle is his mother. They ask her if this is true and Michelle tells them it is and that it is okay for him to stay at The Rovers. He stays for a couple of weeks, causing problems for everyone, so Ryan moves in with Liam and his wife Maria Connor (Samia Ghadie). He "loses" Steve's daughter Amy Barlow (Amber Chadwick) and barricades himself in the pub, but Michelle feels obliged to send him back to his adoptive mother, Wendy Neeson (Jane Slavin). She meets Alex again and has taken him to Ireland to meet his grandparents. She later tells Alex and his family that she cannot have Alex in her life because Ryan is her son.

Liam dies in a hit-and-run accident arranged by Carla's partner Tony Gordon (Gray O'Brien). Michelle is distraught, especially as Paul also died in a car accident just over a year before. Michelle attends Tony and Carla's wedding and later discovers that Liam had an affair with Carla as Sally Webster (Sally Dynevor) drunkenly tells Maria. This infuriates her and she confides in Michelle and her cousin Tom Kerrigan (Philip McGinley), confusing them as they thought she had the wrong idea about the situation. Steve has a drunken one-night stand with Becky Granger (Katherine Kelly), following a dispute with Michelle. He doesn't tell Michelle but she becomes suspicious when Steve and his friend Lloyd Mullaney (Craig Charles) are nervous when she's around. Liz tells Michelle that Steve is close friends with Leanne Battersby (Jane Danson), so she blames her, as she knows that Steve has had a drunken one-night stand. Steve tells her that he is in love with Becky and Michelle ends their relationship. After the break-up, Michelle quits her job at The Rovers as she and Ryan move in with Maria.

Michelle leaves to do another tour with JD for six months. The night before she left, she sleeps with Peter Barlow (Chris Gascoyne) and she and Ryan walk in on Maria and Tony kissing and furiously storm out. She later apologises to Maria and helps her tell Michelle's parents, Helen (Dearbhla Molloy) and Barry Connor (Frank Grimes) about her new relationship. She returns in September 2009 and has a brief fling with Jake Harman (Kenny Doughty). Michelle catches the eye of Ciaran McCarthy (Keith Duffy), who relentlessly pursues her, despite Michelle giving him the cold shoulder in an attempt to mask her true feelings. Ciaran is leaving for a cruise and persuades her to go too and she accepts. Michelle and Ciaran return and are shocked when a shaken Carla tells her that while she was away, her partner, Frank Foster (Andrew Lancel), raped her and that he is on bail, awaiting trial. Michelle and Ciaran help Carla cope and persuade her not to sell the factory because of Frank's lies. Carla eventually returns to work, much to Ciaran and Michelle's relief but Underworld suffers as Carla struggles, and Michelle gratefully accepts help from Nick Tilsley (Ben Price). Michelle and Ciaran's romance also suffers as they realise that they want different things and Ciaran has doubts about Michelle. Ciaran tells Michelle that he is returning to the cruise ships and Michelle decides to go too but changes her mind, feeling that she can't leave Carla and tearfully watches as Ciaran leaves.

Michelle steals a contract from Frank to stop him from putting Carla out of business. When Frank is found dead in Underworld, everyone is a suspect and Carla is arrested on suspicion of murder but is released without charge. Michelle worries that she will be arrested because she went to see Frank, and stole the contract, shortly before he was killed but doesn't admit what she's done until after Frank's mother, Anne Foster (Gwen Taylor), accuses Carla. Michelle later confides in Carla about what she did and Carla burns the contract. Carla later persuades Anne to tell the police that she killed Frank accidentally after she heard Frank taunting Carla and admitting that he raped her.

A few months later, Carla's half-brother Rob Donovan (Marc Baylis) arrives and starts work at Underworld with Michelle and Carla. In July 2012, Michelle is overjoyed when Ryan (now played by Sol Heras) returns from university but is angered when he sets fire to Steve's backside while helping Sophie Webster (Brooke Vincent) paint the house. Further questioning by Michelle forces Ryan to admit that he was expelled for taking drugs. Michelle takes Ryan to work with Maria's brother Kirk Sutherland (Andrew Whyment) at the factory. However, when alone, Ryan fakes an injury to get time off and Michelle thinks that he is really hurt so she and Rob take him to hospital. Later, Ryan tells her that he plans to sue and Michelle tries to talk him out of it but he is unmoved, insisting that he will do it anyway. Michelle eventually realises that Ryan is lying when Rob and Leanne's sister Eva Price (Catherine Tyldesley) expose his deceit by making sure she sees him doing a dance.

On a night out, Ryan offers Kylie Platt (Paula Lane) some cocaine but she turns him down in disgust and tells Michelle. However Ryan insists that Kylie offered him the cocaine. However, Michelle later finds Ryan snorting cocaine in The Rovers and is absolutely livid. To make him realise what he is doing, she calls the police and has him arrested but he is released with a caution. Michelle and Kylie almost fight in the street but are stopped by Lloyd and Nick's mother Gail McIntyre (Helen Worth). Steve begins helping Ryan so that Michelle will go out with him. She eventually does, they reunite and rent the flat above the kebab shop. When Carla gives Peter a share in Underworld, Michelle is wary of Peter destroying the factory, like he did the bookies. After arguing repeatedly with Peter, Michelle quits and goes to work at The Rovers. Steve later announces that he has bought The Rovers from Eva's mother Stella Price (Michelle Collins) and intends to make Michelle landlady. However, he doesn't mention that Liz owns half of The Rovers. She returns to Weatherfield and resumes her place as a landlady. Michelle moves into The Rovers with Steve, Liz and Amy (now played by Elle Mulvaney). Michelle and Carla reconcile but she stays at The Rovers and is replaced by Eva at Underworld.

In January 2015, Steve is diagnosed with clinical depression and not wanting to burden Michelle, he decides to end their relationship without explanation. This leads Michelle to believe that he does not love her anymore so she goes on a date with Hamish Young (James Redmond). Whilst driving the Underworld staff to an awards' ceremony, Steve is chased by some boy racers who eventually cut him up and cause him to swerve. Steve crashes the minibus, leaving the staff trapped in the wreckage. Michelle escapes and goes to find Steve, much to the other passengers' worry. Whilst at the hospital, Steve finally tells Michelle that he has depression and that was the reason why he had chosen to end their relationship. Michelle promises to help him recover.

In March 2015, Michelle discovers that Steve owes £10,000 in tax which he had been ignoring. Liz's boyfriend, Tony Stewart (Terence Maynard) offers to lend him the money to clear his debt, but after starting an affair with Amy's mother Tracy Barlow (Kate Ford), Liz and Tony plan to take The Rovers from Steve and Michelle so Tony tells Steve that he needs his money back. Subsequently, Steve proposes to Michelle but is convinced that she doesn't really want to marry him, and only said yes out of pity, so he calls off the engagement. Later, Steve finds a candlelight dinner prepared and assumes that Tony has prepared the meal for Liz, and calls Tony out in front of the entire Rovers at the Butler Auction. Michelle then confesses that it was actually her who prepared it for them, and calls Steve up onto the stage to explain that she had said yes because she loves him. Michelle then proposes to Steve, getting the engagement back on track.

In May 2015, after some persuasion from Liz, a reluctant Steve agrees to sell his share of The Rovers to a company called "Travis Limited", who is actually Tony. Tony then persuades Liz to sell her share to Travis Ltd, in order to start a new life in Spain. However, Carla steps in and offers to buy Liz's share, so Michelle no longer has to worry about being kicked out of their home, and Liz accepts as Carla promises to keep Steve and Michelle as the pub managers. Liz then learns about Tony and Tracy's affair so she stops the sale. Steve and Michelle finally marry. In November 2015, Liz persuades Tony to give their relationship another go but only does this to make him sign The Rovers over to Steve. Once he has done this, she dumps Tony in front of the whole pub and he leaves, humiliated. Michelle is overjoyed because The Rovers is hers again.

In 2015, Steve leaves Weatherfield for a while. Michelle stays as she has too much work on, including planning a wedding for a client named Saskia. Saskia introduces her fiancé, Will Chatterton (Leon Ockenden), to Michelle. She is surprised as Will was Michelle's first boyfriend. Michelle and Will spend time together and develop feelings for each other. Michelle tries to back away from Will by refusing to organise the wedding, then getting help so she does not have to deal directly with the couple but this does not work. Michelle and Will acknowledge their feelings for each other. When Steve does not come home for Michelle's birthday, Michelle goes to Will's home and they kiss. As Michelle and Will are about to sleep together, Michelle sees photos of Will and Saskia and leaves. Michelle goes home and finds Steve has come home. Michelle tells Carla about what happened with her and Will and he tells Michelle that he has called off his wedding for her but Michelle tells Will that she loves Steve. Michelle tells Liz about kissing Will. Liz tells Michelle not to ruin her marriage over it but Saskia tells Michelle to stay away from Will. Steve is shocked but later forgives Michelle and they reconcile. Michelle discovers she is pregnant but Steve then says he does not any more children, unaware that Leanne is also pregnant as a result of a one-night stand during Steve and Michelle's separation over Will.

In January 2017, Michelle falls ill at hers and Leanne's shared baby shower moments after Robert Preston (Tristan Gemmill) confesses his love for her. She is rushed to the hospital and is kept overnight. However, in the morning Michelle goes into labour after a 23-week-long pregnancy and gives birth to a baby boy, whom she and Steve name Ruairi McDonald. Ruairi is not breathing and due to the hospital's policy of not intervening before 24 weeks, he dies. This leaves Michelle devastated, and she contemplates suicide in order to be with Ruairi, but is talked out of it by Robert. In February 2017, Leanne gives birth in an elevator, with Michelle visiting hers and Steve's son, Oliver Battersby. At Oliver's welcome home party at the Bistro, Steve holds Oliver and reveals that he is Oliver's father. Michelle is initially furious and punches Leanne, however, she is distraught at Steve for his betrayal of her. Michelle throws glasses at Steve in front of everybody at The Rovers. Michelle then discovers Liz knew the truth. Steve begs Michelle to forgive him but she tells him that he killed their marriage before leaves and orders Steve to not follow her. The following week Michelle locks Liz and Steve out of The Rovers, she then grabs Eva by the hair and kicks her out after Eva refuses to leave. A few weeks later she kisses Nick after they talk about Leanne and Steve being together. Michelle goes to spend a few days with Carla until things calm down.

When she returns, Steve arranged for him and Michelle to go for a marriage counseling session. After initially agreeing to go, she changes her mind after Robert's confession of his love for her. They have sex together back at Robert's flat, however, Steve finds out about their relationship. He is furious and threatens to fight her for the divorce. When Steve mentions that Michelle is still wearing her wedding ring, thinking that she wants a divorce, she hits back that she only wears her wedding ring to remind her of how much she hated him. She angrily throws her ring at Steve and declares war on him, promising she will do whatever it takes to get half of everything, and she moves out of The Rovers and moves in with Robert for romance and business as Michelle herself divorces from Steve. In August 2017, Will returns to Weatherfield as a potential love interest for Maria, while Michelle is left shaken after witnessing Chesney Brown (Sam Aston) being stabbed with a glass bottle in The Bistro by Rich Collis (Fraser Ayres). A vendetta is later started against Robert, and Michelle is convinced that Rich is behind it. After going into town for a drink, Michelle's drink is drugged and she is kidnapped, tied up, gagged and left in the boot of a car in a nearby car park. The following morning, she is found by a woman in a state of complete distress and gives a statement to the police describing what happened. A few days later, Michelle does a drug test and is told that Rohypnol was used to abduct her. Robert believes that Rich is behind Michelle's kidnap and brutally beats him up, leaving him in a critical condition and Robert facing a court hearing. Everyone is unaware, however, that Will was behind the kidnap and is stalking Michelle. She later, however, finds out and he is found guilty. In November 2017, after Robert is released from prison he is diagnosed with testicular cancer, leaving Michelle distraught. Robert struggles with the diagnosis badly and begins gambling, running The Bistro into large debts. Due to this, Michelle robs The Bistro but is hit over the head with a glass bottle by Carla's sister, Kate Connor (Faye Brookes), who is unaware that it is her. Later on, after recovering from the head injury Michelle visits Kate and pretends to be innocent however Kate knows she was the robber, Michelle, however, starts to blackmail Kate as she knows about her affair with Rana Nazir (Bhavna Limbachia).

In February 2018, Michelle cuts her hand and goes to the medical centre and meets a trainee doctor named Ali (James Burrows), whom she discovers is her son Alex, who is bitter at Michelle for not being in contact with him for years. They gradually start patching their relationship up. Robert proposes to Michelle, which she accepts and they start to plan their wedding. In May 2018, Michelle is distraught when Carla and Kate's brother Aidan Connor (Shayne Ward) commits suicide and considers postponing the wedding but doesn't although Robert then has a heart attack due to steroid use. Ryan (now played by Ryan Prescott) flies from Ibiza back to Weatherfield for the wedding and doesn't get along with Ali, which upsets Michelle. Just moments before Michelle and Robert can get married, however, Pat Phelan (Connor McIntyre) gatecrashes the ceremony with his daughter Nicola Rubinstein (Nicola Thorp) - whom he accidentally shot whilst trying to flee Weatherfield for his nefarious activities. After forcing Ali to save Nicola's life, Phelan requests for a hostage and selects Michelle - despite Robert's pleas to be taken instead to no avail. When Phelan clocks his gun and threatens to kill Michelle and Robert, Michelle quickly complies to spare Robert and she is taken hostage by Phelan. He drags her into the kitchen, where he finds himself confronted by Anna Windass (Debbie Rush) - whom Phelan had blackmailed into sleeping with four years earlier before going on to frame her for pushing Seb Franklin (Harry Visinoni) off a ladder a year earlier, which resulted in Anna's four month imprisonment until she was released at the time Phelan's crimes were exposed on the week Michelle proposed to Robert. As Anna and Phelan exchanged glances at each other, Michelle used this opportunity to try and escape from Phelan's clutches - prompting him to shove her aside and shoot Michelle. As Michelle stumbles to the ground, she watches as Anna charges Phelan with a knife and stabs him in the chest - causing him to stumble onto the ground in pain. Shortly afterward, Robert bursts into the kitchen with Ali and Carla. They proceed to tend to Michelle's aid, ignoring Phelan as he pulls the knife out of his chest and vows to have Anna imprisoned for his eventual demise. Michelle retaliates by promising to describe the stabbing as self-defence. Although Phelan blurts out to Michelle that in doing so would risk her facing the possibility of prison, Michelle states that she would task the risk for Anna's sake and for that of Phelan's two murdered victims: Andy Carver (Oliver Farnworth) - whom Phelan had locked in his old house's cellar a year earlier since he left his “father” Michael Rodwell (Les Dennis) to die of a heart attack, before killing him after forcing him to execute his friend Vinny Ashford (Ian Kelsey) - and Luke Britton (Dean Fagan), the brother of Andy's girlfriend Steph Britton (Tisha Merry). Shortly after Phelan dies in front of Michelle and her wedding guests, including Anna, she is subsequently taken to the hospital - though not after telling Robert that she meant what she said, stating that Phelan has destroyed enough lives during his reign of terror upon Weatherfield. By the time Michelle has recovered, as does Nicola, she reunites with Robert, Ali and Ryan.

In October 2018, Michelle becomes drawn into Ryan's troubles with Ronan Truman (Alan McKenna). One night, Ryan witnesses Ronan's son Cormac and doesn't phone the ambulance upon fearing of the consequences - which results in Cormac's death. When Ronan threatens Michelle, Ali and Ryan at Cormac's funeral upon learning of Ryan's involvement in Cormac's death, Michelle drives Ryan out of Weatherfield - only to be followed by Ronan. In the ensuing car chase, Michelle's car breaks down and Ryan tries to face Ronan himself - but is knocked down by his car. As Michelle and Ali look over Ryan's bloodied body, Leanne sees the commotion after coming back from Steve and Tracy's wedding; at the moment she exits the taxi, Ronan reverses and hits her with his car too, before crashing the car himself. In the end, Leanne and Ryan survive whilst Ronan dies - which Michelle soon learns isn't by accident; Ali confesses that he deliberately caused Ronan's death shortly after the accident, in order to prevent him from having the chance to target them and Ryan once more. Robert later learns of the truth about Ali's involvement in Ronan's death but keeps it a secret due to his marriage with Michelle.

Robert later tells Michelle that he wants them to have a baby and when Michelle thinks she is pregnant. Robert is ecstatic however Michelle is hit in the stomach by a football and so Carla takes her to the hospital, she tells Carla that she cannot go through being pregnant again after what happened with Ruairi. After telling Robert about this, she tells him to leave her as he has plans to have children. In March 2019, Michelle supports Carla when she suffers a mental health breakdown. After the factory roof of Underworld collapses and Rana is killed under the debris, Carla is wrongfully blamed for the incident. She later receives text messages from Alya Nazir (Sair Khan), pretending to be Rana back from the dead. The following week after Carla goes missing after fleeing from the medical centre, Michelle, along with Kate and hers and Carla's father Johnny Connor (Richard Hawley)), learns from Peter how serious Carla's illness is and starts looking for her. Michelle also lashes out at Robert for accusing Carla at Rana's memorial. Carla is later saved by Peter, who prevents her from jumping from a fire escape and she is sent to a mental health facility in Carlisle, where Peter stays with her.

In July 2019, Carla returns to the Street. At the exact same time, Alya asks for Ryan's help in assisting her with a catering event for a charity fundraiser. At first, Michelle refuses, as she is still angry with Alya for what she did to Carla. But Ryan convinces Michelle to bury the hatchet with Alya and give her a chance. After discovering Robert was having an affair with Vicky Jefferies (Kerri Quinn) and that he impregnated her, she vowed revenge whilst pretending to forgive Robert. At their wedding, she humiliated and dumped him at the altar before selling The Bistro to a mystery buyer. When Robert is arrested for Vicky's murder, it is later revealed Michelle and Vicky planned on framing Robert for murder, but when Michelle has to help Vicky deliver hers and Robert's son, Sonny Jefferies, they have no choice but to bring Vicky to the hospital where the police discover she is alive and Robert is freed. Robert later records Michelle confessing hers and Vicky's plan he blackmails her into letting him see Sonny. After Robert is shot to death on Christmas Day 2019, Michelle is guilt ridden for her revenge on him leading up to his death. A couple days later, Michelle is horrified to discover Ray Crosby (Mark Frost), who once made sexual advances towards her, is the new owner of The Bistro. Due to this Michelle leaves Weatherfield for Dublin.

In March 2023, Michelle is mentioned by Alya to be having an operation, which was why she was unable to visit Ryan in hospital after he was hurt protecting Daisy Midgeley (Charlotte Jordan) from an acid attack by her stalker Justin Rutherford (Andrew Still). Ryan later has a phone conversation with Michelle, though her voice is not heard by viewers.

Michelle is again mentioned in May 2023 by Carla, who says that she had promised Michelle that she would look after Ryan after he returns to hospital after catching sepsis.

== Reception ==
As Michelle settled into the canvas, she became an increasingly large focus of storylines as well as airtime. In 2007, Kym Marsh won a number of awards for her work as Michelle. Marsh was nominated for "Best Actress" at the 2007 Inside Soap Awards. At the 2007 TV Quick and TV Choice Awards, she won the Best Soap Newcomer award for her portrayal of Michelle. She also won 'Best Newcomer' at The British Soap Awards. However, in 2008, as the character dominated more storylines, some fans began to tire of her as well as her behaviour. The baby-swap storyline, which Michelle was central to, was largely panned by both fans and critics, columnist Grace Dent said of the plot; "...It feels like something ripped from a copy of Pick Me Up magazine and read to me laboriously over 22 weeks". In September 2008, Marsh won the award for 'Best Dressed Soap Star' at the Inside Soap Awards. In August 2017, Marsh was longlisted for Best Actress at the Inside Soap Awards, while the death of Michelle and Steve's son was longlisted for Best Show-Stopper. While Marsh was not shortlisted for Best Actress, the nomination for Best Show-Stopper made its shortlist. They lost out to Emmerdale's motorway crash.

In 2009, Ruth Deller of entertainment website Lowculture who runs a monthly feature of the most popular and unpopular soap opera characters, profiled Michelle, criticising her personality stating: "She’s continuing to get more and more entitled and unbearable, but we’re not sure the Coronation Street writers have noticed how much we all hate her yet…" Later that year Deller criticised Michelle again, writing, "It really is the month for all our old hate figures to resurface. Michelle’s still apparently irresistible, and her hatefulness was amplified when the show paired her up with the equally detestable Jake. Do the writers realise we hate her? Are they deliberately torturing us? It’s beginning to look more and more the case…" In 2010, Dan Martin from The Guardian put Michelle on his "fantasy hit-list" of characters to be killed-off in 50th anniversary special for being "increasingly shrill and pointless", and wrote that he believed that it would create "better drama" if the soap's scriptwriters used the accident to kill-off "major characters we're supposed to care about".
