= Ryan Connor =

Fictional character from Coronation Street

- Coronation Street character
- Ryan Prescott as Ryan Connor (2018)
- Portrayed by: Ben Thompson (2006–2010); Sol Heras (2012–2013); Ryan Prescott (2018–present)
- Duration: 2006–2010, 2012–2013, 2018–present
- First appearance: 30 August 2006
- Introduced by: Steve Frost (2006); Phil Collinson (2012); Kate Oates (2018)
- Sol Heras as Ryan Connor (2012)

- Ben Thompson as Ryan Connor (2009)
In-universe information
- Occupation: Student; Switch operator Catering assistant Disc jockey Waiter; Labourer; DJ; Barman
- Father: Nick Neeson
- Mother: Wendy Neeson
- Adoptive father: Dean Powell
- Adoptive mother: Michelle Connor
- Stepfather: Steve McDonald (adoptive)
- Brothers: Ali Neeson (adoptive)
- Half-brothers: Ruairi McDonald (adoptive)
- Grandfathers: Barry Connor (adoptive)
- Grandmothers: Helen Connor (adoptive)
- Uncles: Paul Connor (adoptive); Liam Connor (adoptive)
- First cousins: Paul Connor Jr. (adoptive); Liam Connor Jr. (adoptive)
- Other relatives: Carla Connor (adoptive)

Ryan Connor is a fictional character from the British ITV soap opera Coronation Street. He first appeared on-screen during the episode broadcast on 30 August 2006. The character was initially played by actor Ben Thompson from his introduction until 8 October 2010, when the character was written out of the serial. Ryan was created by series producer Steve Frost as part of the Connor family. The character was reintroduced in 2012, with the role recast to actor Sol Heras. Heras quit the role in July 2013 and Ryan departed on 2 October 2013. Ryan's return was confirmed in February 2018 and he returned on 23 May 2018, with Ryan Prescott recast in the role. Prescott took a break and Ryan's temporary exit aired on 20 December 2023. Ryan returned on 1 March 2024.

Ryan's storylines include discovering that Michelle Connor (Kym Marsh) is not his biological mother, his relationships with Sian Powers (Sacha Parkinson), Katy Armstrong (Georgia May Foote) and Bethany Platt (Lucy Fallon), becoming a drug abuser, feuds with his brother Ali Neeson (Dario Coates/James Burrows), along with fellow residents Vinnie Powers (Ian Dunn), Owen Armstrong (Ian Puleston-Davies), and Sarah Platt (Tina O'Brien); encouraging his own friend Sophie Webster (Brooke Vincent) to take drugs; being in debt to drug lord Ronan Truman (Alan McKenna) that results in the character being run over by the latter; and getting beat up by local builder Gary Windass (Mikey North) after unwittingly getting involved in his loan-sharking empire. He was also in a relationship with Alya Nazir (Sair Khan) and supported her grandmother Yasmeen Nazir (Shelley King) when she goes through a coercive control ordeal at the hands of her husband, Geoff Metcalfe (Ian Bartholomew). He was also the unintentional victim to an acid attack at the hands of Justin Rutherford (Andrew Still). Ryan's storylines include steroid abuse, online sex work and his love affair with Daisy Midgeley (Charlotte Jordan).

== Casting ==
Thompson auditioned for the role of Cameron McIntyre in 2006, however the producers asked him to audition for the part of Ryan Connor instead. His audition was successful and he was given a six-month contract, along with the option to extend it for up to a year. Thompson billed his character as "mischievous" and said that he is "not a bad lad, but he's not a good lad either." Series editor Garth Philips teased the Connor family, calling them "a twenty-first century Coronation Street family". He said that the family are "a joy to watch on screen" and the audience would be "enthralled and excited by them". Thompson made his debut appearance as Ryan on 30 August 2006.

== Development ==
=== Early storylines ===
In October 2007, it was announced that an upcoming storyline would involve Michelle Connor (Kym Marsh) finding out that Ryan may not be her son. A show insider told the Daily Star: "Can there really be anything more traumatic for a parent to have to endure?" The storyline ended in early 2008 and was not mentioned since. Speaking of the storyline Ben Thompson said: "It's weird that for such a massive storyline it never came to anything, It's been one of those very weird ones in terms of that storyline. It's sort of been forgotten and I don't understand how and if they are going to follow it up."

In 2009, Ryan began a relationship with Sian Powers (Sacha Parkinson). Thompson filmed his first screen kiss with her. He said of the experience, "It was bizarre because Sacha had done one before and I hadn't. I knew the line I had to say and then kiss her. I knew it every time, and every time I said it I was shaking." He continued, "Oh it was dreadful. I mean I don't get nervous when I go on stage or anything like that, but it was just bizarre. It was one of those things that I got really nervous about." Upon his 2012 return, it was announced that Ryan would embark on a relationship with an older woman.

=== Departure (2010) ===
In August 2010, it was rumoured that Coronation Street producer Phil Collinson was considering axing a number of the younger cast including Ryan, Chesney Brown (Sam Aston) and Gary Windass (Mikey North) because he feared that the show was becoming more like Channel 4 soap opera Hollyoaks. On-screen Ryan chose to attend a Scottish university and he departed in October. The character's departure was confirmed but the producers denied that they had axed Ryan. An ITV spokesperson said: "Ryan hasn't been axed from the show and is still very much a part of Michelle Connor's life. There are plans to see him in future episodes when he returns from university for holidays. In October 2010, Thompson said of his departure: "It wasn't my choice to leave Coronation Street," he said. "But a new producer came in and wanted to shake things up. I am one of the characters that sadly wasn't part of the plan. Ryan is being sent off to university and can come back, but I don't know if that will happen for the foreseeable future. I am sad, because it has been the biggest part of my life for the past four years. It has given me the freedom to work on my music, though. Writing music is something I have always done, but I've never been able to focus on it before because I had to do Coronation Street. It's nice to be able to do something completely different to acting. Kym Marsh revealed that she was upset over Thompson's departure as they were both very close.

=== Reintroduction (2012) ===
In March 2012, Simon Boyle of the Daily Mirror reported that Ryan would be returning to Coronation Street. Boyle said Ryan would return as "a very dark character" who has a "damaging impact" on the soap's younger residents. The character's return was not confirmed until 17 May 2012. Sol Heras took over the role from Thompson, after he chose not to return to the soap. A writer for itv.com stated that Ryan returns home unexpectedly after he is thrown out of university. Series producer Collinson said "Ryan returns carrying a dark secret and Michelle is going to have the fight of her life as she battles to get her troubled son back on the straight and narrow. Sol is a brilliant young actor and I'm so excited to welcome him to the cast." Asked about his audition Sol Heras said: "I thought initially that it would be quite a long, drawn-out process, but it all happened quite quickly! I had my first audition with the casting department, and then I heard later that I'd made it onto the longlist of actors that they were considering. After that, I made it onto the shortlist, which to me was an achievement in itself. I then had a screen test with Kym Marsh and Brooke Vincent. Six days later, my agent phoned me to tell me that I'd got the part - so that was one of the best phone calls I've ever had."

=== Drug abuse ===
In May 2012, it was rumoured that once Ryan would return he would now be a much darker character and would become involved in a drug storyline with Sophie Webster (Brooke Vincent). Kym Marsh who plays Michelle Connor confirmed the storyline in June 2012, Marsh said: "Ryan's been off doing his own thing, and has got heavily involved in drugs. Michelle expected him to come back as the same kid he was before he went away, but that's not going to happen." Asked how difficult this experience will be for Michelle, the actress replied: "Very hard. Michelle's got her work cut out trying to get Ryan back on the straight and narrow, but we'll see her get support from outside influences." Speaking of the storyline Sol Heras said: "It's a very serious storyline but in the real world it does happen. As long as it's done professionally and done well, it's great. I think it'll be good for young people to see the consequences that come from drugs. You'll see that the drugs are the reason that Ryan is falling out with everyone and causing trouble. There's a loneliness to Ryan because no-one really trusts him. It just shows that it's a bad way to go." Speaking of being compared to Ben Thompson (who previously portrayed Ryan) he said: "Ryan is not the way he was before and he's picked up bad habits, so that's enabled me to come in and essentially be a fresh character, He's changed so much that I didn't have to stick to how the previous actor had played him, which really helps when you're coming into a new show."

=== Relationship with Katy Armstrong ===
While Ryan and Katy are running an errand together, their van breaks down and Katy and Ryan end up sharing a kiss. The following month, Foote teased the storyline during an appearance on Daybreak explaining that it begins when Katy is teased by her friends for being dull. The actress continued "It's her friend's 18th birthday, so they're having a party. They all keep taking the mick out of her, saying she's sitting at home and she's boring. She just wants to go out and have fun, and then [Ryan] starts making a bit of a move on her!" Ryan "sees Katy in a new light" when she turns up at The Bistro for her friend's birthday, where he is DJing. Heras commented that his character has not really noticed Katy before, as she is a stay at home mother, but seeing her "dolled up" and in his environment catches his attention. Heras said "He realises how pretty she is and what a gorgeous girl she is. He manages to sort it for her to get a job at the kebab shop and yes he probably does have an ulterior motive."

Katy and Ryan start to become closer at the kebab shop and one day go in for another kiss. Foote believed that Katy had not had a "teenage wild time" because of her relationship with Chesney and their son, so her head is turned by Ryan and it is exciting for her. Foote added that Katy does not mean to hurt Chesney, but the situation with Ryan gets out of her control. Chesney later proposes to Katy in front of their family and friends at Faye Windass' (Ellie Leach) birthday party, but hours later he learns about her affair with Ryan.

=== Departure (2013) ===
Ryan's exit storyline saw him decide to take a job as a DJ in Ibiza, after realising that there is nothing keeping him in Weatherfield. Steve suggests that Ryan should go to Ibiza and live his life. Steve knows that Michelle is worried about Ryan so he sees it as an opportunity to solve their problems. Gregson told a reporter from TV Choice that his character was just offering Ryan advice. Steve's actions do not go according to plan when Michelle blames him for Ryan's departure.

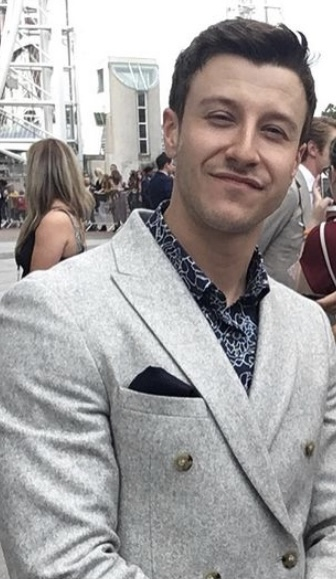
Ryan Prescott (pictured) was cast to play Ryan in 2018.

=== Reintroduction (2018) ===
This Morning presenter Sharon Marshall announced on 7 February 2018 that Ryan would be reintroduced during the year. Ryan returns following the reintroduction of Michelle's biological son, Ali Neeson (James Burrows). It was unconfirmed whether Heras would reprise the role. Series producer Kate Oates confirmed on 12 March 2018 that the role of Ryan would be recast. She told Ben Lee of Digital Spy that an actor had been cast, although she refused to reveal his identity. It was revealed on 26 March 2018 that actor Ryan Prescott had been cast in the role of Ryan. Paparazzi photographs were released showing Prescott filming with cast members Tristan Gemmill (Robert Preston) and Rob Mallard (Daniel Osbourne).

=== Temporary departure (2023) ===
The character took a previously unannounced break on 20 December 2023, after he moves to Glasgow for a DJ gig after his affair with Daisy Midgeley (Charlotte Jordan) was exposed.

== Storylines ==
=== 2006–2010 ===
Ryan arrives with his mother Michelle Connor (Kym Marsh) and it is clear that the two of them have a very close relationship. Ryan is caught by Norris Cole (Malcolm Hebden) vandalising The Kabin. Michelle makes him help in the newsagents every night after school for a week. For a time, Michelle dates affluent businessman Sonny Dhillon (Pal Aron). After they break up, Ryan goes joyriding in Sonny's car. He is caught by the police, though later released. When he returns to the Street, his uncle Paul Connor (Sean Gallagher) smacks him across the face. The reason for this is later revealed to be that Paul caused the demise of Ryan's late father, Dean Powell, due to careless driving when Ryan was 9 years old. Later, Paul dies in a car accident after kidnapping Leanne Battersby (Jane Danson). Ryan is really upset after losing Paul and his father but he survives without them remembering that he still has Liam.

Ryan is stalked by a mysterious stranger who knows him by name. When tracked down, the man, Nick Neeson (Robert Horwell), explains that he believes Ryan to be his real son, and his own son Alex Neeson (Dario Coates) to be Michelle's after a baby mix-up at the hospital. A DNA test later confirms this to be the case. Ryan gets extremely jealous when his mother starts taking Alex out for the day and has a fight with him. They are both hit by a car but suffer minor injuries. Ryan opens up to his uncle Liam Connor (Rob James-Collier) about how much Michelle is choosing Alex over him and then cries. Liam tells Steve McDonald (Simon Gregson), Michelle's boyfriend, who tells Michelle that Ryan is losing sleep over the fear of losing his only parent. Even though Michelle does not want to lose them both she still has to send Alex home because Ryan is the son that she has loved and raised since birth. She is also reassured by Steve that even though Alex is the son she had with Dean, Ryan is the son she raised with him and the son Dean knew before he died. After Alex moves out, Ryan moves back in. Ryan continues to see Nick on occasion but stops after his uncle's death. He realises that no one can compare to Dean. One time Ryan leaves his book behind, leaving his mother to chase after him starting to say he is just like his dad. Ryan becomes upset at the prospect of not inheriting anything from Dean but then Michelle reassures him that because they spent so much time together his traits have rubbed off on Ryan. Ryan then looks wistful as he started to realise how great Dean was.

Ryan attends Tony Gordon's (Gray O'Brien) stag party. Tony sends Ryan home as he is too young to go to a strip club and later that night Liam is killed in a hit-and-run. Ryan is later informed of the news by Michelle. Ryan became inconsolable and Michelle thinks it best that he doesn't see the body at the morgue as it will upset him even more. However, Ryan adamantly argues that he has to come in order to get closure so his mother reluctantly gives in. On the day of Liam's funeral, Ryan tells Maria that he is trying to escape his grandfather Barry Connor (Frank Grimes) because he is trying to bond with him like Liam and he is not in the mood, however, this all changes after the funeral. Ryan kisses Sian Powers (Sacha Parkinson) after one of his gigs and the pair enter into a relationship. Sian's father, Vinnie (Ian Dunn) arrives on the scene, threatening Ryan as he thinks that he has been sleeping with Sian, after finding condoms in her bag. It is revealed that Sian bought the condoms and she and Ryan have sex. Sophie, Michelle and Jake Harman (Kenny Doughty) catch them, causing an argument that results in Sian leaving and spoiling Michelle and Jake's night. After Sian's father finds out that Ryan and Sian have slept together, he sends Sian to Southport to live with her mother, leaving Ryan and Sophie devastated.

Sian comes back to Weatherfield and is reunited with Ryan and Sophie. Later Sian breaks up with Ryan, after suspecting that he is attracted to another girl. When Sophie finds Ryan sat on the pavement outside his house, she gives him some advice on Sian. Ryan misinterprets the situation and kisses Sophie, causing her to walk off in disgust. Ryan later begs Sophie not to tell Sian about what he did and he later makes amends with her. However, Sophie tells Sian about the kiss in front of Ryan and Sian ends the relationship for good. After Sian goes back to Southport, Ryan bumps into Sophie in the street and tells Sophie he thinks they are getting back together after Sian phoned him. However, Ryan catches Sophie and Sian kissing at the builder's yard. Although he is initially disgusted that Sian is bisexual, he agrees to keep quiet about the relationship. Ryan tires of life in Manchester but stays on, as he feels that Michelle is dependent on him, until Ciaran McCarthy (Keith Duffy) convinces him that he needs to start the life he dreams of. After spending a number of days in Glasgow with Ciaran, Ryan decides to transfer to university there and leaves Weatherfield.

=== 2012–2013 ===
Two years later, Ryan returns to Weatherfield and spends time with Sophie. He tries to kiss her, but she rejects him. Ryan accidentally sets alight the curtains in Steve's house and Steve finds them trying to extinguish the flames, so he tells Michelle. Michelle gets Ryan a job working at Underworld factory, but he fakes a fall and tries to sue the company. The factory's owner, Rob Donovan (Marc Baylis), proves Ryan faked his fall when he and Michelle see him performing the limbo in a bar. Michelle throws Ryan out of her flat, so he gets drunk at the Rovers. When Steve takes him home, Ryan confesses that he has been kicked out of university.

Ryan begins working at Street Cars taxi firm and befriends Kylie Platt (Paula Lane). While they drink together in the Rovers, Ryan offers Kylie some cocaine, but she declines and he takes it alone in the toilets. Michelle discovers this and reports him to the police; Ryan is released with a caution. Ryan later tries conning Steve into giving him some money, but it does not work. Ryan gets a job at the local kebab shop with Tracy Barlow (Kate Ford), who tries to seduce Ryan. They have sex and Tracy tells him that she is pregnant; they decide to move to Scotland with Tracy and Steve's daughter, Amy Barlow (Elle Mulvaney). Tracy confesses to Ryan that she was lying; he gets high and plays chicken on the road with Sophie. As Ryan walks across the road, Sophie pushes him out of the way of an oncoming car and is knocked down. Sophie falls unconscious and Ryan runs away, worried that he will get into trouble for being in possession of drugs. Sophie lies to the police, stating that she cannot remember what happened, before warning Ryan that she will not tell the police if he stops taking drugs; he agrees.

Ryan grows closer to Katy Armstrong (Georgia May Foote), who gets a job working in the kebab shop. She develops feelings for Ryan and sabotages his date with Steph Britton (Tisha Merry). When Ryan confronts her, she kisses him and they begin an affair. Katy's boyfriend, Chesney Brown (Sam Aston), dislikes their friendship and feuds with Ryan. Chesney discovers the affair and ends his relationship with Katy, so she and Ryan begin a public relationship. Ryan struggles with a serious relationship and caring for Katy's young son, Joseph Brown (Lucca-Owen Warwick). When Katy spots Ryan with a random woman, Jamie-Lee (Kate Holderness), she ends their relationship. Steve then advises Ryan to find a long-term job, which makes Ryan realise there is nothing left for him in Weatherfield. He contacts a friend, who offers him a job as a DJ in Ibiza; Ryan accepts the job and leaves Weatherfield.

=== 2018–present ===
Ryan returns five years later for Michelle's wedding to Robert Preston (Tristan Gemmill). When Robert's best man cancels his stag do, Ryan arranges a pop star-themed party, where he clashes with Alex, now known as Ali (now played by James Burrows). On Michelle's wedding day, Ryan goes missing but is collected from a house by Robert and Daniel Osbourne (Rob Mallard). Ryan explains that he has had sex with a married woman and when her husband arrives, Ryan claims that Robert had sex with her so he punches Robert. After the wedding, Ryan decides to stay in Weatherfield. He applies for a job at Underworld but is eventually gets a job as a waiter at the restaurant Speed Daal. Ryan is sacked after spying on Kayla Clifton (Mollie Winnard) with Bethany Platt (Lucy Fallon), but she secures Ryan a job as a labourer with Gary Windass (Mikey North). He arrives late on his first day and leaves early after completing the wrong job, angering Gary.

Ryan asks Bethany on a date and they have dinner at Michelle's flat. As they get intimate, Bethany suffers a panic attack and hits Ryan several times. She rushes out, which is seen by her mother, Sarah Platt (Tina O'Brien), who presumes that Ryan attacked Bethany and attacks him, leaving him hospitalised. When he awakens, he cannot remember any details about the attack. When Ryan remembers the attack, he begins blackmailing Sarah for money. Ryan decides to return to Ibiza but changes his mind after speaking with Michelle. Sarah stands up to Ryan, so he stops blackmailing her and resumes his friendship with Bethany.

In October 2018, Ryan and Michelle become involved in a feud with gangster Ronan Truman (Alan McKenna) after Ryan is present when his son, Cormac, overdoses on drugs but Ryan does not call an ambulance, fearing that Cormac will be sent to prison. After Ronan threatens the Connors after going to Cormac's funeral, Michelle drives her, Ryan and Ali out of Weatherfield, only to be chased by Ronan. After a car chase, the car breaks down, due to Tracy damaging it in a bid to get mechanic Abi Franklin (Sally Carman) in trouble, and Ryan tries to face Ronan himself but is knocked down by his car. As Michelle and Ali tend to Ryan's bloodied body, Leanne sees the commotion, but Ronan reverses and hits her with his car too, before crashing the car himself. Ronan is impaled by a sharp piece of wood, which Ali rips out of him as he states that he will continue to make the Connors suffer, killing Ronan.

As Ryan begins to recover in hospital, Bethany begins to realise her true feelings for Ryan. When Ryan returns home, he and Bethany kiss, and they begin dating. When a traumatized Ali begins taking his anger out on everyone, especially Ryan, Michelle, and Robert, he flirts with Bethany, and Ryan goes to punch him, as Michelle and Robert walk into the bistro. Robert accidentally lets it slip that Ali killed Ronan to Ryan, and Ryan confronts a beaten-up Ali after he gets into a fight, as Ali was criticising Ryan for Cormac's death, and Ryan argues with Michelle and Robert as they defend Ali.

In March 2023, Ryan planned to leave Weatherfield to become a DJ in Ibiza with a woman named Crystal. On the day of Daniel's wedding to Daisy Midgeley (Charlotte Jordan), Ryan steps in to be Daisy's chauffeur after the wedding car is stolen. However, as the pair prepare to leave The Rovers Return to go to the wedding, Daisy is confronted by her stalker Justin Rutherford (Andrew Still), who throws a glass of acid at her. Ryan jumps in front of Daisy and is hit in the on the left side of his face, upper body and left arm by most of the acid whilst some of it lands on Daisy's chest. A shocked Justin flees the pub as Ryan collapses to the ground in agony. Daisy phones for an ambulance and listens to the operator's instructions to tend to Ryan until the paramedics arrive. Ryan is took by Daisy the pub's bathroom where she places him in the shower and hoses the acid off of him and cuts away the part of his shirt that the acid landed on. Eventually, paramedics arrive and take Ryan to Weatherfield General. Ryan is later visited by Alya in at the hospital and later Daisy, who informs him that the police have arrested Justin.

Ryan is later visited by doctors, who say that they were successful in removing damaged tissue from him, but say that it is too early to know if he would need a skin graft for his face. They also say to Ryan that they hope to take him into surgery to skin graft his arm. Afterwards, Ryan is visited by Alya, who tells him that she's sorry Michelle cannot see him (due to her having an operation). Ryan does not mind as he did not want visitors seeing him as he was and soon asks Alya leave him alone. Daisy visits Ryan to say that Crystal had visited said that Ryan could still come with her to Ibiza when he was ready to. Ryan tells Daisy that the doctors told him that he was lucky due to Daisy's actions as it stopped the acid burning deeper. Daisy replies that she followed instructions and anyone would have done it, though Ryan did not think so. After having a skin graft for his arm, Ryan is visited again by Daisy and later Alya, who vows that she will visit him every day until he gets discharged.

A month later, Ryan learns from Daisy that Justin plead not guilty for his actions, causing Ryan to express worry over having to relive his experience in court at Justin's trial. Alya assures Ryan that she will be by his side, which makes Ryan admit that he still has feelings for her. However, Alya tells Ryan that she only sees him as a friend. Ryan is also visited by Crystal. Ryan later decides to see his injuries and is told by his surgeon that the scars were not healing quickly and that Ryan would need a skin graft. After hearing this news, Ryan flees the hospital but is later found at a tram station by Daisy and his aunt (also adoptive distant cousin) Carla Connor (Alison King), who convince him to return to hospital and have his skin graft. Later, Ryan receives a text from Crystal, unaware that it was actually Daisy who had sent the text to spare his feelings as Crystal had decided to return to Ibiza without Ryan, due to wanting nothing to do with him anymore because of his injuries.

After having the skin graft, Ryan prepares to leave the hospital when a young girl wanders into his room and stares at his scars, which upsets him. Alya tries to comfort Ryan, but he tells her not to tell him how he should be thinking or feeling. Ryan later receives more texts from Daisy under the guise of Crystal. After leaving the hospital, Ryan moves in with Carla. He considers going to Ibiza to be with Crystal, but Daisy convinces him to go out in the local area rather than stay inside. Later, Daisy told Daniel that she was only hanging out with Ryan until he was well enough and she could leave him to it, which Ryan overheard. Ryan later tells Daisy that he had heard her and Daniel's conversation before rushing to be sick, making Daisy wonder if Ryan has an underlying problem. Later, Ryan sends a voice message to "Crystal", before passing out. He is found by Daisy and Daniel, who call an ambulance. Ryan is took to hospital where it is discovered that he has sepsis. Daisy visits Ryan in hospital with the intention of telling him that she has been posing as Crystal. However, before she can do this, Ryan tells her that he does not need her pity as he has people who care like Crystal. This causes Daisy to storm out of the hospital and continue to message Ryan as Crystal. Ryan goes to the Rovers Return with Carla but becomes uncomfortable when a woman there stares over at him. When Carla confronts the woman, Daisy reveals that the woman is Justin's sister Karen, who has come to apologise to her for Justin's behaviour. Carla states that Karen should apologise to Ryan too. Daniel tells Carla that Justin changed Daisy's, to which Carla replies that Daisy led Justin on, due to her history. Ryan reminds Daisy of how to she ended his relationship with Alya, but Daisy states that incident has nothing to do with the current situation.

Later, Ryan meets Karen, who reveals that she passed on what he and Carla had said about Daisy to Justin's lawyer. When Ryan does not appear to give his statement at Justin's trial, Daisy goes to see him and learns what Karen had done. Daisy tries to convince Ryan to go to the trial, but he does not want to as he believes that the information Karen passed on about them will cause Justin to walk free. Later, Daniel tries to urge Ryan to go to the trial, stating that they need to face it together and get justice. When Ryan starts getting distressed, Carla has Daniel leave. Daniel's words convince Ryan to go to the trial to give his statement. Ryan gives his statement but is angered when Justin's defence barrister accuses him of being in love with Daisy and organising the acid attack himself. Afterwards, Ryan leaves the room after Justin claims that Ryan tried to throw the acid at him, only to spill it on himself. Daisy follows Ryan to comfort him and they are approached by Karen, who again tries to justify her actions, only for Ryan to warn her that he would make Justin pay if he does not go to prison. Afterwards outside The Rovers Return, Ryan apologises to Daisy for the harsh words he had said to her earlier and tearfully speaks of how he has to lie on his front to avoid tears touching his scars. Daisy wipes away Ryan's tears and then kisses him. Ryan is shocked by this and leaves. After returning to the court, Ryan is pleased when the jury find Justin guilty, but tells Daisy that they should keep a distance from each other because of their kiss. After returning home with Carla, Ryan after being concerned about lack of texts from Crystal, looks online and sees news that she is in a coma. Moments later, he receives a text from "her", apologising for not being in touch with him. This causes Ryan to realise that the person sending him texts was not Crystal at all and that he was being catfished.

Ryan is visited by Daniel, who convinces him to speak with Daisy. Later, Daisy visits Ryan and apologies for kissing him, insisted that it was not because she felt sorry for him. Ryan replies that he has missed Daisy and they kiss again. Ryan later encounters Max Turner (Paddy Bever), who talks about a phone that Daniel had given him in prison that had previously belonged to Daisy and revealing to that he found a voicemail from Ryan to Crystal on it, causing Ryan to realise that Daisy was the person messing him as Crystal all along. Ryan later confronts Daisy about her actions, to which Daisy replies that she did it to comfort Ryan as the real Crystal did not want anything to do with him. Ryan goes to the Rovers to tell Daniel about finding out about Daisy being Crystal and learns that Daniel already knew about it. Ryan decides not to tell Daniel about his and Daisy's kiss as he does not wish to hurt Daniel or his son Bertie's feelings. Afterwards, Ryan decides that he does not wish to speak to Daisy again because of her deception.

Ryan later began working at The Bistro again but returned to Carla's flat after overhearing Leanne confronting a female customer who did not wish to be served by Ryan because of his appearance. Ryan later decided that he should work in The Bistro's kitchen for a while after deciding that he was not ready to deal with strangers. Ryan later decides to quit his job at The Bistro to visit Michelle in Ireland. He bids farewell to Carla and smiles to Daisy before being driven to the airport by Carla's husband Peter Barlow (Chris Gascoyne). A few weeks later, Ryan returns to Weatherfield and has steroids delivered to him and then injects them into himself. Daisy attempts to make amends with Ryan, but he is still upset with her for catfishing him. Carla later attempts to convince Ryan to forgive Daisy, but he refuses. Ryan later purchases gym equipment to use for exercising but keeps quiet about taking steroids to Carla. He also decides to reconcile with Daisy.

Ryan takes the steroids and makes workout videos for his account on a website called Ovidz but does not show his face. Ryan also moves out of Carla's home and begins flat sharing with Lauren Bolton (Cait Fritton). Ryan is later persuaded by Daniel to do a lecture at the Greenford Secure Training Centre about the acid attack. Later whilst talking with Daisy, Ryan is accidentally dosed with water by Max's friend Gav. This causes Ryan to hallucinate and see Justin instead of Gav. Angered to see the man responsible for his injuries again, Ryan tackles him to the ground before being restrained by Daisy and Max. After coming to his senses, Ryan apologises to Gav and comes clean to Daisy about taking steroids. Afterwards, Ryan uploads a video onto Ovidz, showing his face and announcing that he was closing down his account and says that he did something that hurt someone he cared about, referring to his attack on Gav in Daisy's presence.

== Reception ==
All About Soap's Laura Morgan called Ryan a "sweet, caring lad" while played by Thompson. Upon the character's return in 2012, Morgan stated that he was "rebellious" and "a lazy oik". In 2021, Laura-Jayne Tyler from Inside Soap criticised the character for being underused, calling it "Such a waste of a Connor!" and requesting that "Someone had better find a place for Ryan soon".
