= Sian Powers =

Fictional character from Coronation Street

- Coronation Street character
- Portrayed by: Sacha Parkinson
- Duration: 2009–2011
- First appearance: Episode 6999; 26 January 2009
- Last appearance: Episode 7769; 30 December 2011
- Introduced by: Kim Crowther
In-universe information
- Occupation: Student; Volunteer
- Father: Vinnie Powers
- Mother: Janet Powers

Sian Powers is a fictional character from the British ITV soap opera Coronation Street, portrayed by Sacha Parkinson. Sian was introduced as a love interest for Sophie Webster (Brooke Vincent). Sian joined the cast of Coronation Street alongside Ben Richardson (Lucien Laviscount) in January 2009 as Sophie's schoolmates. They soon form a new group of teenagers along with Ryan Connor (Ben Thompson). Sian and girlfriend Sophie are Coronation Street's first lesbian couple. It was announced on 29 May 2011 that Parkinson had quit her role, and she made her last on screen appearance on 30 December 2011.

Fifteen-year-old Sian, from Southport, arrives and starts a relationship with Ryan Connor, but later broke up with him. Sian's father attacks Ryan after finding out he slept with his daughter. Sophie developed increasing feelings for Sian and the pair then kiss. Sian initially rejected Sophie, and Sian moved back to Southport to live with her mother, but Sian and Sophie later start a relationship. The two go on to get engaged, but realising that Sophie was attracted to Amber Kalirai (Nikki Patel) and that it was only Amber's rejection that stopped Sophie cheating on her, Sian breaks up with Sophie and leaves Weatherfield.

== Creation and development ==
=== Casting ===
It was announced on 15 December 2008, that actress Sacha Parkinson has been cast as Sian alongside Lucien Laviscount. They were both introduced as schoolmates of Sophie Webster (Brooke Vincent). A Coronation Street insider told the Daily Star "Brooke is an amazing actress and the introduction of two characters her own age will give the writers free rein to come up with some fantastic plots for her. Being so young means there’s a limit to what Sophie can get up to - but now she has her own gang there's more scope for juicier storylines. It's great for Brooke, too, because she knows both Lucien and Sacha from her college and acting classes." They added "It will give her an added boost to have her mates around her." This was Parkinson's second role on the soap as she had previously appeared in a guest non-speaking role on 30 August 2002, playing Celine, a friend of Sophie's sister Rosie Webster (Helen Flanagan), two years before Brooke Vincent became the third actress to take over the role of Sophie. Prior to her first appearance on 26 January 2009, Sian was mentioned twice, on 24 December 2008 (in the year before and over a month prior to her first appearance) and on 23 January 2009 (three days before her first appearance).

=== Storyline development ===
Parkinson said she was honoured to play a lesbian character in such an iconic soap. She told Digital Spy: "When they first told us we were just excited and nervous to be honest," Parkinson said. "It was just an honour that they trusted us with it, and that it was going to be such a huge thing. We were very aware that there were a lot of people involved in the storyline," Vincent added. "So many people - all working hard, all giving 110% - who would really be relying on us to do it well". Speaking of the future of her character, Parkinson said "Everybody expected it not to last, and now that it has lasted this long, they've been pleasantly shocked. It's not going to be a straightforward relationship - no relationship ever is - and they have their ups and downs. It's a love story and that's what we've tried for from the start, rather than just making it a phase".

"Sian pulls away but then they kiss again. For Sian, she's never really thought about Sophie in that way before. For Sophie though, she's had a chance to think about it and she knows that it's what she wants. For a moment, it feels right for Sian but then she realises what's happening and rushes out."

— Parkinson describes Sian's reaction.

After she found out that she was to have a wedding, Parkinson said she was "very excited" for the scenes. Parkinson told Celebs on Sunday of the storyline: "Sophie proposes because she's confused by the feelings she's having for Amber. She decides the one thing that will keep her and Sian together is if they get married. But their parents aren't exactly on board, so it looks like things aren't going to go very smoothly. I'm not sure what's going to happen after that, but I've heard there's a big wedding in a church with two wedding dresses just in time for Christmas. I'm so excited!"

In an interview with Digital Spy in April 2010, Vincent and Parkinson were asked how they found out about the storyline. Vincent said: "They called me and Sacha into a meeting with Kim [Crowther] the producer. I'd heard about this storyline they were going to have for me - I don't know where I got it from and it's probably me that gave them the idea opening my big mouth! Then they got me and my mum in and told us about the whole chastity one first and Kim said, 'Then we find out that Sophie's not in love with Ben, she's in love with Sian!' My stomach just turned with nerves - it was more shock than anything". Parkinson also commented: "When I first got told, I was laughing because I didn't believe it! I'd heard a rumour but when I went in, they told me it was happening! It was a shock that I'd been given the chance to take on such a big story but I was just excited. Brooke and I were told together, so we were both nervous and worried about making sure we pulled it off. I feel fortunate to have been given this opportunity".

=== Departure ===
On 28 May 2011, Laura Armstrong of The People reported Sian, Cheryl Gray (Holly Quin-Ankrah), Russ Gray (Finton Flynn) and Chris Gray (Will Thorp) would be leaving Coronation Street later that year. Armstrong reported Sian would be set for heartache before her departure as Sophie would embark on a relationship with Amber Kalirai (Nikki Patel). Parkinson said she was sad, but excited for her final storyline, which would feature Sian and Sophie's wedding day. Of her departure, Parkinson told the Press Association, "I'm very sad but I'm very excited. I'm in two minds, I don't know whether I'll regret my decision or not but as it's come closer I know it's what I need to do. But it's a sad place to leave because everyone's like a family and everyone's so close". She added: "But I only live round the corner so I'll be popping in every day". As Sian and Sophie prepare for their wedding, Kevin questions Sophie about her feelings for Sian. Sophie tells him she is doing the right thing in getting married. During the ceremony, Sian says her vows with conviction and feeling, but Sophie stammers her way through her vows. Sian senses Sophie's doubts, about their pending marriage, and runs away from the church totally distraught. Sophie returns to her home, to find Sian heartbroken, and packing her belongings with the intent to leave Sophie and Weatherfield. Sophie sobs to Sian that she had nerves, and that she desperately wants to marry her. Sian has a change of heart, and agrees to get married. But soon after this, Sian overhears Sophie explaining to Amber, that she regrets kissing her, and saying she loved her. Sian is completely devastated by this infidelity, as she trusted Sophie, but now says, she hates her. As Sian sits in her mother's car crying; Sophie is overwhelmed, and heartbroken collapses to the pavement; sobbing and wailing uncontrollably. Sian is emotionally shattered, sobbing intensely; as her mother drives Sian away out of Weatherfield. Sacha Parkinson leaves Coronation Street after three years playing Sian Powers.

== Storylines ==
Sophie and Sian discuss the captain of the swimming team who they both fancy. Sophie jokes with Sian about her crush on Ben. Ben comes to the Websters house to collect Sian and Sophie for youth club. Rosie tells Ryan that Sophie's friend Sian fancies him. Sian's mortified and Sophie's furious with her sister. Sian tells Ryan how brilliant his gig was and they kiss under the stars.

Sian starts having stomach pains and Sophie accuses Sian of faking an illness in order to avoid going to the prom. Sian collapses, due to a ruptured appendix and recovers with Sophie by her side. Ryan spots Sian kissing Sophie and feels disgusted. Sian goes to see Ryan, explaining that she is confused, but thinks she is in love with Sophie. She begs Ryan to keep quiet about her relationship with Sophie. Ryan reluctantly agrees and the girls sneak off to a festival together but Sally finds out and insists they stop seeing each other but continue to meet in secret. Sian comes up with a plan for them to spend time together, choir practice at the church.

On Roy (David Neilson) and Hayley Cropper's (Julie Hesmondhalgh) wedding day, Sophie argues with Claire Peacock (Julia Haworth), who is suspected of child abuse after Aadi Alahan (Zennon Ditchett) suffers a head injury. To clear her name, Claire is forced to reveal that Sian and Sophie were minding the children at the time of the incident. In the heat of the moment, she also tells people that they are lesbians, as she saw them kiss but kept it to herself. They reveal to Rosie Webster (Helen Flanagan) that they face homophobia at college. Rosie makes Sophie's discreet gathering into a raucous party with the girls she works with. Sophie and Sian are caught kissing when their pastor comes in to wish Sophie a happy birthday. The next day the Pastor Michaels (Chris Grahamson) visits Sophie's house to speak to them about their relationship. He reads from the Bible and tells them that their relationship is sinful. Infuriated by this, Sian speaks angrily about how ridiculously outdated he sounds and makes it clear that they are no longer welcome at church so Sian and Sophie leave, intending to find a new one. Sian and Sophie sleep together for the first time. They sleep together again but Sally catches them and is furious. They go and stay with Eileen Grimshaw (Sue Cleaver) to give Sally time to cool down. They have a troubled month as Sophie is going through a hard time. Sian leaves to go on holiday to Tangiers, resulting in some tension after Sian returns home with plans to move back in with her mother. Although Sophie initially feels jealous and neglected, after she accidentally falls from a church roof, she and Sian reconcile while Sophie is in hospital. Sian also encourages the Websters to recognise the negative impact that their recent actions are having on Sophie.

The couple volunteer at a charity kitchen for the homeless but Sophie is ripped off by James Cunningham (James Roache). Sian goes on holiday to France with her mother and Amber Kalirai (Nikki Patel) kisses Sophie while she's away. Sian returns to Weatherfield early from her holiday in France. Sophie is surprised to see Sian; and feels guilty about the kiss with Amber on a girls' night out the previous evening. Later that afternoon, Sophie tells Sian that her life without her is worthless, and empty, and that she wants to marry Sian some time soon. Sian is very happy by this proposal, as they have been dating for a while. Over the next few weeks Sophie's life becomes complicated, as her unreciprocated feelings for Amber escalate. Sophie begins feeling guilty and suggests to Sian, that as their parents disapprove of them getting married, as they are too young; they should elope to Gretna Green. Sian reluctantly agrees, worrying about the upset eloping would cause their parents. They pack their bags and make their way to Manchester coach station, to catch a coach to Carlisle. Meanwhile, Sally discovers a hand written note, detailing the coach departure time. Both Sally and Rosie rush to the coach station, to explain that she will allow them to get married, if Kevin Webster agrees also. Sian and Sophie are both thrilled and their wedding date is set for late December 2011.

On their wedding day, Sian manages to say her vows, but Sophie struggles. Sian leaves the church in tears and goes home to pack her bags. After a tearful plea from Sophie, Sian agrees that the wedding is back on. However, she then overhears Sophie telling Amber that she is not in love with her and their kiss should not have happened. After telling Sophie she hates her, Sian leaves Weatherfield heartbroken and devastated. Sophie phones and texts Sian regularly, but Sian ignores her, eventually telling Sophie to stop pestering her. On 23 January 2012, Sophie revealed that she hears news about Sian via mutual friends, and that Sian is in Tenerife with her Mum. On 18 July 2012, Ryan Connor (now played by Sol Heras) mentioned to Sophie that he had been in touch with Sian via e-mail and that she was now living with her new girlfriend from the holiday named Chloe and had been for some months. Sian was mentioned on a wedding program (set in late 2011) when Sophie was talking with her new partner Maddie Heath (Amy James-Kelly).

== Reception ==
The Sophie and Sian romantic lesbian storyline has intrigued the viewing audience of Coronation Street. In a poll conducted by Inside Soap, fans voted Sophie and Sian as the couple they wanted to see get married in 2011. Sian and Sophie received 44% of the vote.

In April 2010, Sian's lesbian storyline received positive feedback from After Ellen, a website which gives readers news, reviews and commentary on lesbian and bisexual women in entertainment and the media. Praising the way the sensitive storyline was handled they stated, "so far the storyline has been written positively and without titillation and the actresses have played the characters with conviction. Actress Brooke Vincent's sorrow over Sian's initial rejection was particularly touching. Sources tell us that their relationship will be a long-term commitment by the programme, which already has a long term gay male and long-term transgendered male-to-female character."

Vincent revealed that herself and Parkinson are just like sisters. She told Diva Magazine: "We used to cuddle up in the car," she said. "We'd pull up and get dropped off by my mum and I'd go upstairs and Brooke'd be downstairs sat in my mum's car being sarky like a 30-year-old woman". Vincent added: "We're like sisters. It's mad because when Sacha came onto Corrie we kind of realised why we'd been friends all them years ago. Because we didn't see each other for a bit, did we? We were on our way to KFC at dinner, before, and Sacha said, 'Will we still know each other when we're 30?' and I was like, 'It's mad, I hope so'".

== See also ==
- List of LGBT characters in soap operas
