= Ryan Prescott =

Ryan Prescott may refer to:

- Ryan Prescott, television series character, see list of Neighbours characters introduced in 2016
- Ryan Prescott (actor) (born 1989), English actor
