= Ciaran McCarthy =

Fictional character from Coronation Street

- Coronation Street character
- Portrayed by: Keith Duffy
- Duration: 2002–2005, 2010–2011
- First appearance: Episode 5316; 7 August 2002
- Last appearance: Episode 7745; 25 November 2011
- Introduced by: Kieran Roberts (2002); Kim Crowther (2010)
In-universe information
- Occupation: Chef; Barman

Ciaran McCarthy is a fictional character from the British ITV soap opera Coronation Street, portrayed by Keith Duffy. He made his first on-screen appearance on 7 August 2002, before departing in 2005. He returned in 2010 until Duffy temporary departed in January 2011 to go on Boyzone Tour, and returned on 3 November 2011. Duffy departed the role again on 25 November 2011 due to family commitments. In his duration on the show the character has been at the centre of several romances including relationships with Sunita Alahan (Shobna Gulati), Tracy Barlow (Kate Ford) and Michelle Connor (Kym Marsh). Ciaran has been characterised as a ladies' man and a charmer. The character is also known for his "sex symbol" status. Duffy has received nominations at various soap award ceremonies for his portrayal of Ciaran.

== Creation and development ==
=== Introduction ===
Ciaran first arrived as the "drinking pal" of Peter Barlow (Chris Gascoyne). Duffy was initially employed for a three-week stint. Duffy was later given a year-long contract with Duffy saying it would be "great" to return and described his initial stint as being "the most fantastic time". Duffy later signed another year-long contract reportedly worth £80,000. Duffy was promised "dramatic storylines" which included an affair with Tracy Barlow (Kate Ford).

=== Characterisation ===
The character was initially described as an "irish charmer". On the character Duffy said he would chat up "anything that walks by that's at all attractive or in a skirt" and added that "no-one is safe" from Ciaran's flirting. Duffy later added that Ciaran wouldn't be "really mind" who he was involved with as long as they are "attractive and they like a drink he's happy enough". Duffy has said he is "nothing like" Ciaran which is why he "loves playing him". He added that Ciaran is "still young, free and single". ITV publicity has described Ciaran as liking "the ladies" and "cooking" and harbouring dislikes of "weddings" and "bullies". Digital Spy described the character as "wayward", "flirty", "womanising" and a "ladies' man". What's on TV described the character as a "ladies man" and "hunky". Upon his return a Coronation Street source commented that the character had not changed since he was last seen. The Daily Mirror labelled the character "hapless".

=== Relationship with Sunita Alahan ===
The storyline was announced on 11 January 2003. The relationship begins when Ciaran and Sunita Alahan (Shobna Gulati) "end up sharing a night of passion" after Sunita helps Ciaran make amends with friend Peter. Ciaran and Sunita become engaged but they end the relationship when Sunita realises Ciaran is only marrying her to please her. Upon Ciaran's return to Weatherfield he flirts with Sunita. Duffy said Ciaran was "under the illusion that herself and Dev are together and obviously he and Dev left on bad terms, so she's on her own in the pub and he goes over and starts chatting her up and charming her again. Sunita was quite up for it because they nearly got married." Duffy later added that Ciaran still has feelings for Sunita although he is unsure if they are "of a sexual nature, or whether he just cares about her" .

=== Departure (2005) ===
In 2005, Duffy announced his plans to leave stating it was because he wanted to spend more time with his family. The character's exit was a mutual decision between Duffy and the shows producers. Duffy later said his decision was partly because his "personal life lay in tatters" although he added that professionally the serial "gave me some of the best years of my life".

=== Reintroduction (2010) ===
In 2008 Duffy expressed his desire to return saying he would "love to go back" even if only for "a few months". Duffy later added that he expected a return considering the character was never killed off and it was left open for a potential return. In 2009 Duffy commented that he had "loved" his time at the serial and would consider a return. He praised producers for choosing actors who had not been through stage school like himself saying it worked well because its "good to show real emotion from real-life experiences".

In August 2009 it was reported Duffy was in talks to reprise his role. Months later it was confirmed Duffy was to reprise his role. He began filming scenes for his return in December 2009 with his return airing early 2010. Duffy was given a six-month contract upon his return. After Duffy returned he confirmed that it was always his intention to return to the serial after spending time with family and that he had spoken to executive producer Keiran Roberts saying he would "love to return" with his newly gained experience and confidence within the role. Upon his reasoning for returning Duffy said it was partly because of financial setbacks and partly because he feels like he "can't not work". In March 2010 it was announced Duffy was to leave his role as Ciaran after he reportedly decided not to renew his contract despite "pleas" from producers. This later turned out to be false when Duffy denied claims that he was leaving saying that it was "news to him" and that he planned to remain on the serial for the "foreseeable future". In March 2011 Duffy took a break from filming to tour with his band, BoyZone. Duffy left on-screen when Ciaran went travelling with girlfriend Michelle Connor (Kim Marsh) who departed to go on maternity leave. Duffy later confirmed he would return to filming in September 2011. In July 2011 Duffy confirmed his return would not be "as long" as he had hoped as he felt he was needed at home. It was later confirmed that a "dramatic exit" was being planned for Duffy. Duffy has insisted that Ciaran "will return" and he would not be exiting for good. Producers have since told Duffy that "there was always a job for me on the Street". Duffy has since considered moving closer to studios if producers still want him to return.

=== Relationship with Michelle Connor ===
Upon his return Ciaran has a relationship with Michelle. Marsh announced the plot on 11 November 2009 saying the storyline begins when "Michelle catches Ciaran's eye". Upon Ciaran's return Duffy said Ciaran is "pretty much straight in for Michelle". He explained that Ciaran would "chat up" Michelle, Carla Connor (Alison King), Kelly Crabtree (Tupele Dorgu) and would be "very charming to Liz McDonald who sees it as a come-on". Duffy said that the serial hint that Ciaran "may bed Michelle, Liz, Carla and Becky". On a potential romance for Ciaran with Leanne Battersby (Jane Danson), the girlfriend of Peter, Duffy felt that Ciaran should not romance her due to his friendship with Peter. Ciaran starts "chatting up" Michelle with Duffy saying Michelle "seems to be coming round a bit" but he was unsure whether it would lead anywhere.

Marsh added that Ciaran is "very flirtatious" which would leave Michelle to see that he's "a bit of a one and is probably thinking, 'Stay away!" Michelle denies she had feelings for Ciaran which Marsh said was because Michelle is "wary" of Ciaran "so she makes out that she's not interested". After Ciaran and Michelle begin a relationship Duffy described it as "fiery" and said it was to be part of "big storylines for the 50th anniversary" of the serial. Marsh added that it was always planned for Ciaran and Michelle to begin a relationship upon Duffy's return. Marsh said that she and Duffy wanted the audience to feel that Michelle and Ciaran had "earned this romance" so it was a "slow-burn". She later added that "Ciaran normally just saunters in and has whoever he wants. I think that's why he likes Michelle so much - Ciaran has really met his match in her!" Marsh later added that she felt the romance should be "rocky" after the "will they, won't they" process because it would be "rubbish if we were just happy ever after" and the romance might have gone "stale on screen".

Ciaran and Michelle leave to work on a cruise ship before returning to Weatherfield later on in the year. Marsh said the decision for Michelle and Ciaran to return together was because "viewers like them as a couple". Duffy commented on the character saying he "has had a roving eye for years and has bed-hopped all his life" but is now ready to "settle down" with Michelle. Marsh said the pair are "absolutely rock solid" and are "happy and perfect for each other". She explained that although "living and working together on the cruise ship has clearly cemented their relationship [...] Michelle has started to want to settle down in the street again, whereas Ciaran clearly still has wanderlust". Concerning his exit Duffy said it was "great" and described the storyline saying "Ciaran gambles away all his wedding money and then gets into trouble with Michelle and then he robs a bistro to get his money back and then he gets caught". Marsh later added that after Ciaran gambles away the deposit for the wedding venue that Michelle "thought that he loved her and he wanted to marry her" but because he gambled away the money it made Michelle "feel that she means nothing to him". She added that "She feels insignificant" because "he wants to go off and enjoy himself and have a flighty life and that's not what she wants". Marsh explained that Michelle "adores him and he does love her, but leaving the street, her job and her friends may be a tough choice". After Ciaran leaves Marsh said the pair are still "very much in love".

== Storylines ==
Ciaran first appears when he arrives as Peter Barlow's (Chris Gascoyne) friend from his days in the Royal Navy. He attempts to seduce Shelley Unwin (Sally Lindsay) but when Peter finds out he tells Peter she attempted to seduce him. He leaves soon after when Peter ends their friendship. He returns and begins dating Sunita when she helps him to fix his friendship with Peter. He is soon after arrested for being AWOL from the Navy. After being released, he returns to Weatherfield and becomes engaged to Sunita. He is soon after seduced by Shelley's mother Bev (Susie Blake). Shelley discovers his infidelity. Sunita soon after ends the relationship on their wedding day after she realises he is only marrying to please her. He begins dating Tracy which soon after ends. He persuades Mike Baldwin's (Johnny Briggs) wealthy girlfriend Penny King (Paula Fleming) to invest in his new business, The Nexus an Irish-themed wine bar and restaurant, with him being the chef. The business venture fails shortly afterwards.

Ciaran and Charlie Stubbs (Bill Ward) rescue Sunita and her husband Dev Alahan (Jimmi Harkishin) from Dev's shop which has been deliberately set on fire by Dev's psychopathic ex-fiancée, Maya Sharma (Sasha Behar). Ciaran rescues Dev, with Charlie rescuing Sunita. On 22 July 2005, Bev makes a drunken pass at Ciaran. Ciaran realises Charlie is abusing Shelley and tells her that he cannot stand by and watch while Charlie abuses her.

While at a restaurant, Peter finds Ciaran working there. Ciaran resigns from his job as he dislikes the place and returns to Coronation Street. He takes a shine to Michelle Connor (Kym Marsh) and flirts with Carla Connor (Alison King). Peter tells Ciaran of his alcoholism who agrees to help support him and stop him drinking. However, Peter, seeing his friend drinking, made him desperate again and he begins drinking again; despite his desire to stop. Ciaran, soon after manages to secure his old job back behind the bar at the Rovers. Ciaran soon set his sights on Michelle and attempts to start a relationship although she plays hard to get and Ciaran eventually gives up on her. In September 2010, Ciaran goes for a job interview in Glasgow and is successful, with his impending exit to Scotland, Michelle is forced to face up to her feelings for him. After her son Ryan Connor (Ben Thompson) moves to Glasgow to attend university, Michelle confesses her true feelings for Ciaran and they begin a relationship.

In November 2010, Ciaran is offered a job at The Joinery, the new bar being opened by Leanne Battersby (Jane Danson) and Nick Tilsley (Ben Price), but struggles to tell landlady Liz McDonald (Beverley Callard) that he is quitting his job at the Rovers. In the end, he quits by post, resulting in Liz attempting to bar him from the pub, only for Michelle to quit her job there as well out of loyalty to Ciaran. Ciaran begins his job at The Joinery and later steals the recipe of a hotpot from The Rovers, which has been served by Betty Williams (Betty Driver) for over 40 years. This angers Betty and Liz who claim they have seen rats in The Joinery to scare potential customers off. At Peter's stag night, The Joinery explodes with all the partygoers, including Ciaran, inside. He helps the injured, including carrying ex-fiancée Sunita from the rubble, until the ambulance arrives. In January 2011, Ciaran is offered a job on a cruise and accepts although Michelle does not want him to; so he decides to leave. On his last night, Michelle turns up late from a meeting which annoys him. Neither one of them want to admit they are wrong, so Ciaran leaves. On 24 January 2011, Ciaran returns and asks Michelle to join him on the cruise. Michelle accepts his offer and they leave together while kissing in the back of the taxi.

In November 2011, Ciaran and Michelle return to Weatherfield and announced their engagement. They are shocked to discover that Carla has been raped by Frank Foster (Andrew Lancel). Michelle and Ciaran initially want to marry in The Bahamas but later decide to marry in Manchester. Ciaran is given a job at the Bistro by Nick. Michelle gives him the deposit for the wedding venue they choose but when Ciaran arrives it has already closed. He partakes in a game of poker with Peter, Dev, Kirk Sutherland (Andrew Whyment) and Karl Munro (John Michie). He insults Karl and later gambles the deposit which he loses to Karl. Ciaran asks Peter to lend him money to pay the deposit but he refuses. Ciaran pretends to be co-owner of the Bistro and plans to cater for a client while keeping the money for himself without telling Nick. Nick discovers this plot, so Ciaran is sacked and takes the money from Ciaran; which he was given to him by the customer. Michelle finds out that Ciaran lost the deposit. Michelle agrees not to marry Ciaran and to leave Weatherfield to return to the cruise ship. Michelle changes her mind and Ciaran leaves Weatherfield alone.

== Reception ==
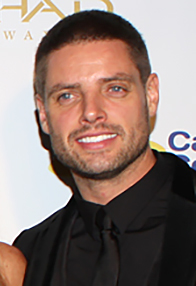
Keith Duffy (pictured) was said to be a "big favourite with viewers" for his role of Ciaran.

At the 2002 TV Quick Awards Duffy was nominated for the "Best Soap Newcomer" award. For his portrayal of Ciaran, Duffy was nominated for "Sexiest Male" at the 2004 British Soap Awards. Duffy was nominated for the "Sexiest Male" award at the 2010 and 2011 British Soap Awards. Duffy was later nominated for "Sexiest Male" at the 2010 and 2011 Inside Soap Awards. For his portrayal Duffy was voted 10th "top soap stud" in a poll ran by entertainment site Digital Spy. Ciaran was voted third in a poll finding Coronation Street's "top three sexiest men" run by Inside Soap.

During his initial stint Duffy "impressed" show bosses and became a "big favourite with viewers". Duffy was offered the chance to return as a regular after the character received a "warm reception". A Coronation Street source told the Sunday Mirror that Ciaran was one of the serial's "most popular characters". Duffy claimed that his return to the role had reinvented him as a "sex symbol" after show producers were "brainwashing" viewers into believing he was "irresistible to women".

Kris Green of Digital Spy said he wasn't "sold" on the idea of Ciaran's return but said he would "reserve judgement" until he heard "echoes of the potential payoff". Jane Simon of the Daily Mirror questioned whether Michelle would stay with Ciaran, "for richer, for poorer, for dumb and dumber?" Simon commented on Ciaran gambling away the money for a wedding venue saying that "like the resourceful chef that he is, he’s cooking up all kinds of excuses to try to get himself out of this jam". Yahoo! also commented on the storyline saying "We all know he’s got the gift of the gab – but really, is he that nice?" Tony Stewart of the Daily Mirror commented on the storyline, questioning whether Ciaran, with his "mixture of Irish charm and blarney" could weather the storm, "probably not". Stewart added that Duffy "will probably never have a row of BAFTAs or Oscars to go with that wall full of platinum discs he's been awarded as part of Boyzone" but that he has "likability" and "obvious chemistry with Kym Marsh as Michelle". Stewart later commented that it was "hard to imagine that even a Salty dog like Ciaran McCarthy has had such bad luck on the ocean waves as he's had on dry land".
