= Fairfield High School for Girls =

Location
- Fairfield Avenue; Droylsden, Manchester, M43 6AB; England
- 53.4755°N 2.1519°W

Information
- Type: Academy
- Motto: Vicit agnus noster, eum sequamur
- Established: 1796; 230 years ago
- Founder: Mary Tyrrell
- Department for Education URN: 136593 Tables
- Ofsted: Reports
- Headteacher: Fee Lealman
- Gender: Girls
- Age: 11 to 16
- Enrolment: 952 pupils
- Colours: Green, Blue
- Website: www.fairfieldhighschool.co.uk

Fairfield High School for Girls is an all-girls' secondary academy in Droylsden, Greater Manchester, England.

== Admissions ==
There are around 950 girls and over 50 teachers.

The current Headteacher, in post since September 2024, is Fee Lealman., following the retirement of Mrs Bateman

It is situated between the A662 and A635 in Fairfield. The M60 is less than a mile away to the east. Fairfield Avenue is accessed via the A635 to the south.

== History ==
It was established in 1796 by Mary Tyrrell and the Moravian Church, a Protestant organisation which originates in the 15th century, with 21 girls and 6 teachers.

=== Grammar school ===
It was a girls' high school, based at The Square. There were plans in 1965, by the divisional executive (for the Tameside area), for it to become a sixth form college, to come into operation by 1967. The Lancashire Education Committee never approved the plan. It was administered by the Borough of Tameside from April 1974.

=== Comprehensive ===
In 1975 the headmistress, Ruth Gleave, resigned and became head of Bradford Girls' Grammar School (which became an independent school at the same time) in Bradford, just before the school became comprehensive in 1979. The school lost its sixth form.

The school was grant-maintained between 1993 and 1999. It then became a foundation school, and then a specialist Science College in September 2004.

== Academy ==
The school converted to an Academy school on 1 April 2011.

== Academic performance ==
The school was ranked second in Tameside in the 2010 school results league table St Thomas More RC College (a mixed school), and 11% above the national average. Tameside GCSE results are more reasonable than many parts of Greater Manchester. The school was graded 2 (good) by Ofsted in its most recent report.

== Notable former pupils ==
- Ellie Leach, actress
- Isabelle Smith, actress
- Shirley Stelfox, actress
- Georgia Taylor-Brown, athlete
- Brooke Vincent, actress
