= Paul Connor (Coronation Street) =

Fictional character in British soap opera

- Coronation Street character
- Portrayed by: Sean Gallagher
- Duration: 2006–2007
- First appearance: Episode 6374; 6 September 2006
- Last appearance: Episode 6571; 6 June 2007
- Created by: Steve Frost
- Book appearances: Coronation Street: The Complete Saga
In-universe information
- Occupation: Businessman
- Father: Barry Connor
- Mother: Helen Connor
- Brothers: Liam Connor
- Sisters: Michelle Connor
- Wife: Carla Donovan (until 2007)
- Nephews: Ali Neeson; Paul Connor Jr. Liam Connor Jr. Ryan Connor (adoptive); Ruairi McDonald
- First cousins: Tom Kerrigan
- Other relatives: Johnny Connor; Kate Connor; Aidan Connor

Paul Connor is a fictional character from the British ITV soap opera Coronation Street. Played by Sean Gallagher, the character arrives with the rest of his family as one of Michelle Connor's (Kym Marsh) two brothers, first appearing during an episode that aired on 6 September 2006. He was later killed off on 6 June 2007, following the actor's decision to leave the cast after only nine months.

== Development ==
=== Casting ===
Prior to the characters arrival, a Coronation Street insider claimed that little was known about the Connor brothers, aside from the fact that they're in the rag trade and started out on the markets. The insider speculated that Paul and his brother are just on the right side of the law, though not out-and-out villainous. Upon their arrival, the brothers were planned to cause trouble for Danny Baldwin (Bradley Walsh).

=== Departure ===
Early in 2007, actor Sean Gallagher's resignation from the soap opera was revealed. Coronation Street scriptwriters planned for his character to be killed off. During an interview, Gallagher claimed that his role on the show was what he'd hoped for, though he would rather play a variety of roles. The actor agreed with executive producer Steve Frost to leave at the end of his contract. The character was originally planned to be killed in Underworld itself; however, this was not clear.

== Storylines ==
The character comes to Coronation Street when his brother Liam Connor (Rob James-Collier) contacts him concerning Adam Barlow's (Sam Robertson) intention to sell his share of Underworld. The two brothers are introduced as brothers of barmaid Michelle. After buying Adam's share of the factory, Paul spends money set aside for his wife, Carla's (Alison King) children's clothing business, causing a row between the couple. Paul stays in touch with a previous owner of the factory, Danny Baldwin, and tells him that Frankie (Debra Stephenson) and Jamie (Rupert Hill) have split up and buys Danny's 60% share of Underworld.

When Michelle's son, Ryan (Ben Thompson), is arrested for joy-riding, Paul violently attacks him upon his return from the police station. This makes Carla suspect that Paul is keeping a dark secret from her. Liam later reveals that Paul was driving on the night that Michelle's late partner, Dean, died. Paul and Liam then moved Dean's body to the driver's seat to avoid arrest for drink driving. This leads to Michelle disowning both her brothers. Paul proves to be an accomplished schemer by covering up the death of Polish factory worker Kasia Barowicz (Irena Rodic). He claims that she had died in the day shift when she was actually working illegally at night.

Paul is shocked to discover that Leanne Battersby (Jane Danson), Liam's girlfriend, is a prostitute, having hired her. He and Leanne agree to keep each other's secrets but Paul becomes frustrated, watching Liam and Leanne get closer. To protect his marriage, he tells Liam that Leanne is a gold-digger, but Liam ignores him. Paul is also uncomfortable about Leanne and Carla going into business together, eventually revealing that she is also a prostitute. Carla later discovers that Paul is her client, ending their marriage, with Paul blaming Leanne. As revenge, Paul locks Leanne in the boot of his car. The car crashes into a lorry whilst he was on the phone to Liam, which made him lose concentration. Following this, he and Leanne are rushed to hospital. Whilst Leanne survives with only a broken rib, Paul dies of his injuries. Carla and Liam blame Leanne for her part in the accident and Paul is buried in Dublin off-screen. Later in 2008, Liam, newlywed to Maria Sutherland (Samia Ghadie), names their stillborn baby son after Paul.
