= Elephant Juice =

- Directed by: Sam Miller
- Starring: Emmanuelle Béart; Sean Gallagher
- Release date: 23 August 1999 (EIFF)
- Running time: 1h 26min
- Country: United Kingdom
- Language: English

Elephant Juice is a 1999 British drama film directed by Sam Miller.

== Cast ==
- Emmanuelle Béart - Jules
- Sean Gallagher - Billy
- Daniel Lapaine - Will
- Daniela Nardini - Daphne
- Mark Strong - Frank
- Kimberly Williams-Paisley - Dodie
- Lennie James - Graham
- Lee Williams - George
