= Class of '76 =

British crime drama

- Also known as: Monroe: Class of '76
- Genre: Crime drama
- Written by: John Ireland
- Directed by: Ashley Pearce
- Starring: Robert Carlyle; Daniel Mays; Claire Skinner; Robert Glenister; Sean Gallagher; Tony Haygarth; Anton Lesser
- Composer: Richard G. Mitchell
- Country of origin: United Kingdom
- Original language: English
- No. of series: 1
- No. of episodes: 2

Production
- Executive producer: Adrian Bate
- Producer: Matthew Bird
- Cinematography: Dominic Clemence
- Editor: David Blackmore
- Running time: 90 minutes
- Production company: Zenith Entertainment

Original release
- Network: ITV
- Release: 3 October – 4 October 2005

Class of '76 (also known as Monroe: Class of '76) is a two-part British crime drama, first broadcast on ITV in October 2005. Written by John Ireland and directed by Ashley Pearce, the series starred Robert Carlyle as investigating police officer DI Tom Monroe, who investigates the mysterious deaths of a group of classmates over a period of years from the same 1976 form class. Daniel Mays, Claire Skinner and Robert Glenister also appear in supporting roles. The series attracted respectable viewing figures, with 6.92 and 5.73 million viewers tuning in for each respective episode. Despite good critical reception, no further episodes were produced. The series was released on DVD on 21 May 2007.

== Critical reception ==
Paul Mavis of DVD Talk said of the series; "Monroe: Class of '76 is an initially interesting, but ultimately too familiar British crime drama. Starring Robert Carlyle as Detective Inspector Tom Monroe, Class of '76 starts off in a promising fashion, with its evocative, eerie depiction of a man committing suicide. But the story continues on in a dreary, sombre tone, with little surprises left as the clichés start to pile up, leading to the obvious finale. Pat Fisher (Stephen Mapes), tormented and guilty about the death of a fellow classmate back in 1976, as well as terrified by what he sees as a pattern of suspicious deaths for his other childhood friends, deliberately runs onto a busy highway and commits suicide by standing in front of a speeding truck. Leaving behind a tape recording of his paranoid ramblings, Fisher's death is written off as a simple suicide by a disturbed mind. Certainly Monroe's superior DS Pritchard (Tony Haygarth), as well as Tom's partner, Steven Grant (Daniel Mays) believe it to be an open and shut case, not worthy of further investigation. However, something about Fisher's tape, as well as some disturbing memorabilia about several crimes years ago, begin to nag at Monroe, who starts to believe that there may be a pattern to these random deaths.

Chief among the evidence that convinces Monroe to continue to dig is Fisher's elementary school class photo that has been marked, indicating three of the children dead. As well, a shadowy, nondescript image of a child has been marked, "Who was he?" On Fisher's confessional tape, he indicates that there were only 32 students in his class, not the 33 that are in the photo. Contacting fellow student Colin Somerville (Sean Gallagher), Monroe learns from the frightened man that he has been tormented over the years by a voice over the phone that says he will be the next to die. Somerville believes as well that the "accidental" deaths of the three students were no accidents, and that Aiden Thompson (Kevin French), a boy who remaining classmates describe as "different," is the killer. After all, Thompson had confessed to Colin that he had murdered the first victim on the list. However, after Colin nearly dies from a hit-and-run attempt, he tries to convince Monroe that perhaps the shadowy, ghostly figure in the class photo is the real murderer.

Compelling clues are thrown out about Monroe's background, but ultimately, little is finally known about Monroe simply because the filmmakers keep too much hidden.

== Cast ==
- Robert Carlyle – DI Tom Monroe
- Daniel Mays – DS Steven Grant
- Claire Skinner – Dr. Kate Tremaine
- Robert Glenister – Frank Thompson
- Sean Gallagher – Colin Somerville
- Tony Haygarth – DS Pritchard
- Anton Lesser – Martin Gibson
- Amelia Curtis – Monica Grant
- Kevin French – Aiden Thompson
- Belle Mary Hithersay – Alison Carter
- William Ilkley – Charlie Drain
- Pip Torrens – Superintendent Flood

== Episodes ==
No.	Title	Directed by	Written by	Original release date	UK viewers (millions)
1	"Episode 1"	Ashley Pearce	John Ireland	3 October 2005	6.82
DI Tom Monroe investigates the apparent suicide of a middle-aged man, and uncovers a series of deaths, whose victims all attended the same primary school class in 1976.
2	"Episode 2"	Ashley Pearce	John Ireland	4 October 2005	5.73
Haunted by the death of young Amy Irvine, DI Tom Monroe gets closer to the person killing her classmates.
