= Sophie Webster =

Fictional character from Coronation Street

- Coronation Street character
- Brooke Vincent as Sophie Webster (2013)
- Portrayed by: Ashleigh Middleton (1994–1997); Emma Woodward (1997–2004); Brooke Vincent (2004–2019)
- Duration: 1994–2019
- First appearance: Episode 3773; 4 November 1994
- Last appearance: Episode 9896; 9 October 2019
- Introduced by: Sue Pritchard
- Spin-off appearances: Coronation Street: Pantomime (2005); Coronation Street: Out of Africa (2008); Coronation Street: Text Santa Special (2013)
In-universe information
- Occupation: Student; Shop Assistant; Company Director; Restaurant Manager
- Father: Kevin Webster
- Mother: Sally Webster
- Stepfather: Tim Metcalfe
- Stepmother: Alison Webster; Abi Webster
- Sisters: Rosie Webster
- Half-brothers: Jake Webster; Jack Webster
- Grandfathers: Bill Webster; Eddie Seddon
- Grandmothers: Alison Webster; Elsie Seddon
- Aunts: Debbie Webster; Gina Seddon
- First cousins: Carl Webster
- Other relatives: Nicolette Seddon; Paul Seddon

Sophie Webster is a fictional character from the British ITV soap opera Coronation Street. She was born on-screen during the episode broadcast on 4 November 1994. She was played by Ashleigh Middleton from 1994 until 1997 and by Emma Woodward from 8 June 1997 until 25 April 2004. Brooke Vincent took over the role on 12 May 2004. Sophie is the second daughter born to Kevin (Michael Le Vell) and Sally Webster (Sally Dynevor) and younger sister to Rosie Webster (Helen Flanagan) and elder sister to half siblings Jack Webster (Kyran Bowes) and deceased Jake Webster.

Sophie's storylines have included her constant rivalry with Rosie, her converting to Christianity and her lesbian relationships with both Sian Powers (Sacha Parkinson) and Maddie Heath (Amy James-Kelly). In 2015, it was announced that Vincent would take a four-month break from the show at the end of her contract, departing in October 2016. Vincent returned as Sophie on-screen on 6 February 2017, along with sister Rosie, after actress Flanagan agreed to reprise her role back in October 2016. Vincent left the show in 2019 when she went on maternity leave, with Sophie's final scenes airing in October of that year. However, Vincent has said she currently has no immediate plans to return to the show.

== Creation ==
=== Casting ===
Ashleigh Middleton played Sophie from her birth up until March 1997 when Emma Woodward, who was just three years old at the time, took over the role. In 2004, Woodward quit the role of Sophie to concentrate on her school work. The show's bosses ran auditions upon the announcement which resulted in her being replaced with Brooke Vincent, a patron of the Manchester Kids charity. In an interview, Brooke revealed that her role in Coronation Street is just part of her life, stating she does not see it as a job because she sees it as fun. She also works a Saturday job and attends school but manages to fit all three into her schedule. "I have a normal life and the Corrie stuff is my bonus life," As the character grew older Coronation street bosses were impressed by Brooke's performance as Sophie and decided to give her more storylines and to do so they cast some classmates for her in December.

=== Characterisation ===
ITV publicity describes Sophie as a girl who is determined to live her life her own way after being neglected by her parents in favour of elder sister Rosie. Also stating that even after the hardships that she went through growing up, she has turned out pretty well-adjusted with a good sense of humour. What's on TV magazine describes her as not being as bright as her sister Rosie, but always gets her own way as she is the apple of her father's eye. Fellow actor Craig Gazey describes the character as very gobby with a face like a 1970s male glam rock singer and a perfect match for his character Graeme Proctor (Craig Gazey).

== Development ==
=== Background ===
The character of Sophie was created as a sister for Rosie Webster and was born as Lauren in 1994 to parents Kevin and Sally Webster. However, Rosie keeps calling the baby "Sophie" after her doll. Kevin and Sally were persuaded to give her Lauren as a middle name. Although for the first five years of her life, Sophie's parents are very much in love, Kevin's affair with Natalie Horrocks (Denise Welch) changes everything. With Sally struggling to bring up her girls on her own, she makes bad relationship decisions – most notably when she goes out with psychopathic Greg Kelly (Stephen Billington) who kidnaps Sophie. Later, Kevin and Sally remarry and her family get back together. However, soon thereafter Sophie overheard her parents arguing about Sally's affair with her boss, Ian Davenport (Philip Bretherton), whose daughter Gemma is friends with Rosie. She fears they will get a divorce, but this never happens.

=== Christianity ===
In 2009, Sophie reveals to a stunned Sally and Kevin and a happy Ben Richardson (Lucien Laviscount), that she is adopting Christian values, and that she would be wearing a purity necklace. During the storyline which saw Sophie's views change on life by turning to religion and taking a vow of chastity, Vincent praised the soap's producers for using the new plot to challenge stereotypes about religious people. She went on to state: "It's different, isn't it? We all have a stereotypical view of a Christian, but Lucien Laviscount, who plays Sophie's boyfriend Ben, is quite hot, and you don't really think of religious people like that, so maybe it'll make religion cool. Going on to say "It shows you don't have to be a geek or be all 'religion, religion, religion' to be a Christian." ITV series editor Louise Sutton commented on the storyline stating that: "The decision amongst teenagers to declare themselves chaste until marriage is hugely popular in the States. But it is also becoming more widespread in the UK." It was also noted that the storyline showed a stark contrast to her sister Rosie and her sexual behaviour.

=== Sexuality ===
Sophie's character became the focus of a lesbian storyline in 2010. This would be the first time Coronation Street has ever had a lesbian character. Producers had been on the lookout for a lesbian character since 2004. In response to the revelation that former character Violet Wilson (Jenny Platt) was originally intended to be the first lesbian character in the show, an ITV insider told the News of the World in July 2008: "Executives want to create a soap which is representative of society in 2008 and they are acutely aware they need more gay characters." They went on: "It does seem ridiculous [lesbianism] has never been explored on Corrie but that's all about to change." In early 2009 it became apparent that the latter comment saying 'that's all about to change' was said because of the plans to transform the character of Sophie into the show's first lesbian character.

=== Departure ===
In August 2019, it was announced that Vincent would be leaving the soap after 15 years as she prepared to go on maternity leave. Vincent has since said she would not be returning to the show in the near-future as she did not take "typical" maternity leave.

== Storylines ==
Sophie was born to Kevin (Michael Le Vell) and Sally Webster (Sally Dynevor) as the second born daughter after Rosie Webster (Emma Collinge/Helen Flanagan). She was initially called Lauren by her parents, but Rosie continued to call her Sophie, after one of her dolls, and the Websters decided to change baby Lauren's name to Sophie. Sophie's major storylines start when there are problems when she is due to start secondary school. Sophie goes in on her first day but is sent home because she is not on the school's registers. When Sally finds out, she is furious however Sally is responsible as she did not fill in the application forms properly. Sophie kisses best friend Sian Powers (Sacha Parkinson). Sian later confronts Sophie, admitting that she is now confused and although she is not attracted to girls, she is now attracted to Sophie; and she deeply missed not being with her. As Sian kisses her, Sophie responds and they decide to be together, "going out" as a secret couple. Sophie and Sian join a Church choir so that they can see each other more often. Sean Tully (Antony Cotton) tells Sophie he saw her twin at the Manchester Gay Pride event. Sophie explains to her father that she loves Sian and they are dating. Kevin accepts their relationship.

Sophie is devastated to learn that Kevin is the father of Molly Dobbs's (Vicky Binns) baby son, Jack, following an affair that they had. Her mother angrily orders Kevin to leave. Rosie and Sophie stand by their mother. Sian helps Sophie through the difficult time and supports her as much as she can. In the months following, Sophie starts to spiral out of control, frequently skipping college and not doing her assignments. She tries to open up to Sally but is overlooked in favour of Jeff, her new boyfriend. As a result of all the arguments getting to her. Sophie later begins accusing Sian of cheating and they break up. Believing that their relationship is over, Sophie becomes depressed and starts drinking cider on the street, refusing Sunita Alahan (Shobna Gulati)'s offers to talk. That night she ends up at the church she was rejected from previously, thinking that God hates her. Although the Pastor attempts to reason with her and ask her to come back to the choir, Sophie falls from the roof and is sent immediately to hospital. She escapes brain damage and reconciles with her family and Sian who begs Sophie to never leave her.

Sophie's friend, Amber Kalirai (Nikki Patel) takes her to a lesbian bar. Sophie tells Amber that she wants to be with Sian and not to tell Sian where they went in case she gets the wrong idea. A few weeks later, Sian goes on holiday with her mum and Amber takes Sophie out again. Amber spikes Sophie's drink with vodka to help her loosen up and when a lad tries chatting Sophie up, Amber steps in and says that she is her girlfriend before kissing her. Amber tells Sophie the kiss was only to make the lad go away but Sophie is confused about her feelings, telling Sunita that she liked it and did not want it to end. Sunita tells Sophie the kiss did not mean anything to Amber and to focus on her relationship with Sian. Feeling guilty and taking Sunita's advice, Sophie proposes to Sian when she comes home from holiday early. Sian accepts and Sophie tells Sally and Kevin they are engaged, but they tell Sophie they would not give her permission to marry. Sophie asks Sian if she could talk to their parents again about getting married. They talk to Sally, but she tells them they are too young and they do not have her permission. Desperate to marry to make her feelings for Amber go away, Sophie tells Sian if they can not marry in Weatherfield, they should go to Gretna Green instead. They go to the coach station but Sally and Rosie arrive, and Sally tells Sophie she will let them marry in four weeks in Weatherfield as long as Kevin agrees too. Sophie and Sian are delighted. The wedding day soon approaches, and on the hen night, Amber tells Sophie not to marry Sian as she likes Sophie as a friend and does not want her making a mistake. She even tries to kiss her but is stopped by Sunita, who then tells Kevin that Sophie is having doubts about getting married. However, on the wedding day, Sophie tells Kevin that she still wants to marry Sian. When they arrive at the church, Sian says her vows very well, but Sophie stumbles on hers. Kevin tells her that she does not have to do this and slips out that she told Sunita she was not ready. The whole church is confused and Sian begs to know what is going on, to which Sophie admits she can not do it. Sian flees the church in tears. Sian leaves her and Weatherfield, leaving Sophie breaking down on the cobbles hysterically, shouting to Sian that she loves her.

Following her painful split from Sian, Sophie is left feeling bitterly depressed. She decides to resign from her job at the corner shop and decides that she does not like Amber. Sophie goes on a night out with her old friend Ryan Connor (Sol Heras). Ryan is upset after finding out that Tracy Barlow (Kate Ford) was only in a relationship with him to annoy his mum Michelle and to split her up with Tracy's ex-husband, Steve. Ryan gets drunk and high on cocaine and starts playing chicken on a road of busy cars. Sophie finally persuades him to come home however, as he is crossing the road a car comes, Sophie pushes him out of the way but she gets run over by the car. Sally and Kevin were both distraught when they find out that Ryan was involved in the accident, but Sophie defends his actions and makes them promise not to say anything to the police. Physiotherapist Jenna Kamara (Krissi Bohn) helps Sophie's pain go away, but Sophie soon develops feelings for her afterwards. Sophie picks up the courage to finally spend time with Jenna and even kiss her and she responds back. The pair immediately begin dating, much to the disapproval of Jenna's mother Mandy and Kevin. Sophie is not happy when Sally starts dating Tim Metcalfe (Joe Duttine) but they later begin to get along. Jenna later splits up with Sophie because they are so different from one another.

Sophie decides to go and work at a soup kitchen and forces Sally to come with her. At the soup kitchen, Sophie meets Maddie Heath (Amy James-Kelly). Sophie attempts to befriend Maddie despite her bitterness towards her. Sophie and Maddie later begin a relationship and Sophie is delighted when Sally allows Maddie to move into the house with them. Sophie discovers Faye Windass (Ellie Leach) in pain in the flat above Dev Alahan's (Jimmi Harkishin) shop. Faye reveals to Sophie and eventually her parents that she is having a baby. After giving birth to a girl, Faye comes home from the hospital and Sophie visits her. Sophie discovers that the father of Faye's daughter is a boy in Faye's class named Jackson. Sophie comforts Faye, who was devastated when Jackson rejected her after their one-night stand. Sophie soon became suspicious of Kevin's new girlfriend, Jenny Bradley's (Sally Ann Matthews) growing attachment to her brother Jack. Jenny manages to defend herself, ensuring that everyone, especially Kevin, does not believe Sophie's concerns. However, in May 2015, Sophie's suspicions prove correct when Maddie catches Jenny attempting to kidnap Jack. Fleeing the house, Maddie rushes to tell Sophie, but not before leaving a voicemail on Sophie's phone, when she then gets caught up in an explosion at the builders' yard in the aftermath of the huge fire at the Victoria Court flats. Maddie later succumbs to her injuries in hospital, leaving Sophie devastated at the loss of another girlfriend. While Sophie and Kevin attend Maddie's funeral, Jenny goes along with her plan to abduct Jack. Sophie and Kevin learn about Jenny's son, Tom, who died a few years prior and was the same age as Jack. Sophie, Kevin and Rita track Jenny down and try to talk her down from a balcony, where she is threatening to jump with Jack. The police arrive and Jenny breaks down before she is sectioned. With her dad struggling with having another garage considerably further than his main garage, Sophie decides to search for premises that are closer. In October 2016, Sophie goes to America and joins Rosie.

Sophie returns to the street with Rosie. The police later visit the Webster's house after receiving news that the house contains drugs. Rosie and Sophie are arrested after a white powder is discovered in one of their bags, but are released without charge as they find out it is only sweetener. Rosie later has one of her bags returned after leaving in a taxi, Sophie questions her about what is in the bag, however Rosie tells her it is only sweets. After opening the bag Rosie and Sophie discover cocaine. They bury it in Brian Packham's (Peter Gunn) allotment. Sophie hands back her 21% of Kevin's business when he struggles with finances following a fire started by Pat Phelan (Connor McIntyre), which Pat framed Kevin for starting, so she and Rosie join Tim's window cleaning business. When Sally is targeted by an internet troll, Sally decides to resign from the council, so Rosie and Sophie find out the address of the person who placed an obituary for Sally in the paper. They meet Leah Buckley (Molly McGlynn) and confront her, however, she denies being the troll, but her stepmother is to blame and will get her to stop. Leah visits the Websters and asks Rosie and Sophie if Sally is okay. After Sophie tells Rosie about Sally's state, Rosie goes to see Leah and is surprised to spot her aunt, Gina Seddon (Connie Hyde), realising she is Leah's stepmother. Leah admits Gina is the troll and explains that she is ill. Rosie tells Sophie who the troll is and they both go to confront Gina. Gina is pleased to see them but denies trolling Sally and when Leah arrives, she reveals Gina has bipolar disorder. When Gina goes missing, Rosie and Sophie help Leah find her and Gina turns up on the street. Gina wants to talk to Sally, but Leah bundles her into the car and drives off. Sally and Tim visit Gina and Leah and invite them to live with them.

In early 2018, Sophie begins a relationship with Kate Connor (Faye Brookes). However, they split in March, leaving Sophie heartbroken. Following their break up, Sophie becomes close to Kate's brother Aidan Connor (Shayne Ward) and the pair bond due to their similar experiences. After Aidan commits suicide, Sophie is left shocked and blames herself but after speaking to Kate she stops blaming herself and the pair become friends once again. When Zeedan Nazir (Qasim Akhtar) leaves the street to go to London he makes Sophie the manager of Speed Daal.

== Reception ==
Vincent was nominated for Best Dramatic Performance from a Young Actor or Actress award for her portrayal of Sophie at The British Soap Awards 2008. She was put forward by the panel but lost out to Jamie Borthwick. At the 2008 Inside Soap Awards, Vincent was nominated in the category "Best Young Actor". Grace Dent of The Guardian described Sophie's early rebellion phase as the best storyline of Coronation Street in 2005 and even said that she was 'chaving it up' with her friend Nicolette. She also said of the character "She has transformed virtually overnight from a small, cheeky scamp into a Kappa-tracksuited, crop-topped, top-knotted, gum-chomping gobby nightmare." The columnist gave further praise to the character in October 2008 stating that "Sophie is becoming one of the stars of the show right now. She's so lovable and backchatty. Sophie's role has always been as the invisible Webster. She's incredibly wise and loyal but no one listens to a word she ever says, aside from Rita (Sullivan)."

The Sophie and Sian romantic lesbian storyline has intrigued the viewing audience of Coronation Street. In a poll taken by Inside Soap in autumn 2010, the two girls came top of the poll with 44% of the respondents wanting Sophie and Sian married by the next year (2011) in a wedding storyline. In April 2010, Sian's and Sophie's lesbian storyline received positive feedback from the After Ellen website, detailing news, reviews and commentary on lesbian and bisexual women in entertainment and the media. Praising the way the sensitive storyline was handled they stated, "so far the storyline has been written positively and without titillation and the actresses have played the characters with conviction. Actress Brooke Vincent’s sorrow over Sian’s initial rejection was particularly touching. Sources tell us that their relationship will be a long-term commitment by the programme," which already has a long term gay male and long-term trans female character.

== In popular culture ==
In scenes shown in 2005, Sophie referred to herself as a chav, a slang term in England (see Charver for Northern England or ned for Scotland) for a person whose lifestyle, branded casual clothing, speech and/or mannerisms are perceived to be common, proletarian and vulgar. Due to this affiliation, the character is named and quoted in the 2006 book The Chav Guide to Life by Lee Bok.
