= Ben Thompson (actor) =

British actor

- Born: 1 June 1992 (age 33); Radcliffe, Greater Manchester, England
- Occupation: Character actor
- Years active: 2002–2015
- Television: Coronation Street (2006–2010)

Ben Thompson (born 1 June 1992) is an English actor best known for his role as Ryan Connor in the British soap opera Coronation Street. Brought up in Radcliffe, Greater Manchester, Thompson made his screen debut when he appeared in the 2002 film Re-Inventing Eddie. Shortly before turning 13, he appeared in the 2004 CBBC children's comedy programme Stupid!.

Thompson rose to further prominence when he was cast as teenager Ryan Connor in Coronation Street in 2006. As part of the longstanding series, he has been involved in storylines that have dealt with varying topics, including family life, death, and coming of age. In addition to his career as an actor, Thompson is also an amateur musician. He is a member of the Rusholme Ruffians, an indie group who are largely influenced by established Manchester bands.

== Youth and early career ==
Ben Thompson was brought up in Radcliffe, a town within the Metropolitan Borough of Bury, in Greater Manchester, England. He trained in acting from the age of eight at the Carol Godby Theatre Workshop in Bury. For five years, Thompson was educated at nearby Radcliffe Riverside High School. He later reflected that he enjoyed his time at school, interacted well with his teachers and "never went into one lesson where there wasn't [something] interesting to do".

In 2002, Thompson starred alongside John Lynch, Geraldine Somerville, Lauren Cook and John Thomson in the Jim Doyle-directed film Re-Inventing Eddie. The movie is about a man named Eddie (Lynch), who is hounded by social services and branded a paedophile after an innocent bathtime game with his children is taken out of context. About two years later and shortly before turning 13, Thompson successfully auditioned to feature in the BBC children's comedy programme Stupid!. Out of around 400 hopeful youngsters, he was one of only a few to be selected to appear in the show. Prior to Stupid!'s launch on the CBBC channel in 2004, Thompson commented, "When I first started going to auditions I was quite nervous but now I just get on with it. I go to quite a few and it gets easier."

== Coronation Street ==
Thompson auditioned in 2006 for the role of Cameron McIntyre in the long-standing British soap opera Coronation Street. The part would have had him be on-screen friends with Chesney Brown, played by Sam Aston, who Thompson already knew from the Carol Godby Theatre Workshop. Producers for Coronation Street, however, were so impressed by Thompson that they asked him to audition for a different role. His try-out was successful and he was given a six-month contract, along with the option to extend it for up to a year. He was cast as Ryan Connor, a boy who moves to Weatherfield—the fictional Greater Manchester setting of Coronation Street—with his mother, Michelle (played by actress and former Hear'Say band member Kym Marsh), and her brothers, Liam (Rob James-Collier) and Paul (Sean Gallagher). The Bolton News reported that Thompson would spend between one and two days in front of the camera, and that he would be given an on-set tutor to help complete his school work. Impressed with Thompson's acting ability, the producers of Coronation Street had his contract extended to 2009. In May 2012, it was confirmed that Ryan would be recast and played by Sol Heras because Thompson chose not to return.

== Private life and interests ==
Thompson has a keen interest in music and has played the guitar for several years. He often takes the instrument to work with him, as a means of occupying himself during takes. The actor is part of a group: the Rusholme Ruffians, formed by himself and two of his fellow schoolmates while they were still at Radcliffe Riverside High. The Rusholme Ruffians have performed at venues throughout the UK and the band's set list includes their own material, as well as songs by home-town influences such as Morrissey, The Smiths, Oasis, James and The Stone Roses. Thompson has expressed an interest in getting into the music industry later in life. He attended Holy Cross College in Bury, which he left after a year due to filming commitments.

Ben studied at SSR (School of Sound Recording) in Manchester and went on to work at Blueprint Studios in Salford.

== Filmography ==
Film
| Year | Film | Role | Notes |
|---|---|---|---|
| 2002 | Re-inventing Eddie | Billy Harris | |
Television
| Year | Title | Role | Notes |
| 2004–07 | Stupid! | Various | |
| 2005 | 10:96: Training Night | Lee | |
| 2006 | The Girls Who Came to Stay | Footballer | |
| 2006 | Coronation Street | Ryan Connor | 2006–2010 |
| 2015 | Fungus the Bogeyman | Bogey Sentry | |
