= Sacha Parkinson =

English actress

- Born: 11 March 1992 (age 34); Salford, Greater Manchester, England
- Occupation: Actress
- Years active: 2002–present

Sacha Louise Parkinson (born 11 March 1992) is an English actress, known for her role as Sian Powers on the ITV soap opera Coronation Street.

== Early life ==
Parkinson was educated at Walkden High School.

== Personal life ==
On 22 February 2018, Parkinson said that she has endometriosis. The condition led to Parkinson having an operation in April 2017 to remove endometrial cysts from her ovaries along with other endometriosis tissue from surrounding areas.

== Career ==
In one of her earliest roles, Parkinson was cast in Always and Everyone. This was followed by the 2003 Channel 4 adaptation of Jacqueline Wilson's The Illustrated Mum. She later made guest appearances in The Royal, The Street and The Bill before joining CBBC's Grange Hill in 2007, in which Parkinson played schoolgirl Anna Duncan for six episodes. Parkinson appeared in minor guest roles in Waterloo Road, Doctors, Survivors and Shameless between 2007 and 2008, as well as the acclaimed drama Clay starring Imelda Staunton.

In 2009, she was cast as Natasha in the Red Union Films Awaydays, and played the role of Leanne in A Boy Called Dad a Made Up North Productions which was released in March 2010.

On 15 December 2008, it was announced Parkinson was to join British soap opera Coronation Street, where she would play Sian Powers. Parkinson first appeared on screen as Sian on 26 January 2009, as a friend of established character Sophie Webster, played by actress Brooke Vincent. Sian and Sophie later became the soap's first lesbian couple in the spring of 2010. Due to the popularity of the storyline, Coronation Street extended Parkinson's contract until 2011. Parkinson made the decision to leave the soap, filming her last scenes on 18 November 2011. These scenes were shown in an episode on 30 December 2011. She cited a wish to work on other projects and not wanting to outstay her welcome on the show as her reasons for leaving.

On 18 August 2012, Parkinson appeared as a guest star on series 27 of the BBC medical drama Casualty. Parkinson placed 63rd on the 2012 AfterEllen Hot 100 List.

In March 2013, she appeared in a 2 hour long drama on BBC 3 named The Crash, previously titled One Day Like This. Co stars include Skins' Lily Loveless, Georgia Henshaw and Waterloo Road's Darcy Isa. Some of the filming took place in Kilsyth Academy in Kilsyth.

In 2013, Parkinson appeared in Channel 4's four-part drama The Mill, portraying the role of Miriam Catterall. In October 2013, she appeared as Suzy in Truckers.

In 2014, she played Katie in the BBC One three-part drama The Driver.

She appeared in the E4 series My Mad Fat Diary as archetypal "mean girl" Stacey.

In February 2016, it was confirmed that Parkinson was joining the cast of ITV drama Safe House for its second series.

== Filmography ==
| Year | Title | Type | Role | Notes |
|---|---|---|---|---|
| 2002 | Coronation Street | TV | Celine (uncredited) | 1 Episode, Episode #5329 |
| 2003 | The Illustrated Mum | TV | Tasha | TV film |
| 2005 | The Royal | TV | Polly Crunshank | 1 Episode, "Everybody Needs Somebody" |
| 2007 | Grange Hill | TV | Anna Duncan | 6 Episodes |
| 2007 | Waterloo Road | TV | Lisa | 1 Episode, Episode #2.9 |
| 2007 | The Bill | TV | Rose Sterling | 1 Episode, "Lies That Kill" |
| 2007 | Doctors | TV | Cassie Sawyer | 1 Episode, "Innocence Lost" |
| 2008 | Clay | TV | Maria | TV film |
| 2008 | Shameless | TV | Tracey Kelvin | 1 Episode, Episode #5.14 |
| 2008 | Survivors | TV | Kate | 1 Episode, Episode #1.3 |
| 2009 | Awaydays | TV | Natasha | TV film |
| 2009 | A Boy Called Dad | TV | Leanne | TV film |
| 2009–2011 | Coronation Street | TV | Sian Powers | Series regular, 204 episodes |
| 2012 | Casualty | TV | Laura Bellamy | 1 Episode, "Kansas" |
| 2013 | The Crash | TV | Kate Harper | TV film |
| 2013–2014 | The Mill | TV | Miriam | Series 1; Series 2, Main Cast |
| 2013 | By Any Means | TV | Kimberley Brooks | 1 Episode, Episode #1.2 |
| 2013 | Fright Night 2: New Blood | Film | Amy Peterson | Film |
| 2013 | Truckers | TV | Suzy | 1 Episode, Episode #1.1 |
| 2013 | Homeboys | TV | Janine | TV film |
| 2014 | My Mad Fat Diary | TV | Stacey Stringfellow | Series 2, 4 Episodes |
| 2014 | The Driver | TV | Katie McKee | Main role, 3 Episodes |
| 2015–2016 | Mr Selfridge | TV | Connie Hawkins | Main role (Series 3–4) |
| 2017 | Safe House | TV | Dani | Series 2 |
| 2017 | Apostasy | Film | Luisa | Film |
| 2020 | Cold Feet | TV | Laura | Season 9 |
| 2021 | The Pebble and the Boy | Film | Nicki | Film |
| 2023 | Platform 7 | TV | Melissa | 3 Episodes |
