= Ellie Leach =

English actress (born 2001)

- Born: Ellie Louise Leach; 15 March 2001 (age 25); Manchester, Greater Manchester, England
- Occupation: Actress
- Years active: 2009–present
- Television: Coronation Street; Strictly Come Dancing
- Relatives: Brooke Vincent (cousin)

Ellie Louise Leach (born 15 March 2001) is an English actress, known for playing Faye Windass on the ITV soap opera Coronation Street between 2011 and 2023. Following her exit from the soap, she won the twenty-first series of the BBC contest Strictly Come Dancing.

== Early life ==
Leach was born in Manchester, Greater Manchester, on 15 March 2001. Leach attended Fairfield High School for Girls. Leach is a cousin of Brooke Vincent, who played Sophie Webster in Coronation Street between 2004 and 2019.

== Career ==
Leach began her television career appearing in television advertisements for Staples and McDonald's. In 2009, Leach appeared in the film A Boy Called Dad. In 2010, Leach appeared in an episode of Moving On as Stacy.

In 2011, she was cast in the role of Faye Butler, a potential adoptive child for Anna (Debbie Rush) and Eddie Windass (Steve Huison) on the ITV soap opera Coronation Street. In April 2023, it was confirmed that Leach would be leaving Coronation Street after 12 years in the role of Faye, with her departure scenes set to air in a "huge story" in July 2023. It was initially reported that Leach had chosen to leave Coronation Street but would not be killed-off, leaving the door open for the actress and the character to return in the future. However, Leach later confirmed the show's bosses had told her they could "see no future for the character" resulting in her role being axed.

Following her exit from Coronation Street, Leach signed up to appear as a contestant on the twenty-first series of the BBC dance competition Strictly Come Dancing. She was partnered with professional Vito Coppola and the pair went on to win the competition. At age 22, she became the youngest celebrity to win the show, a record previously held by Olympic gymnast Louis Smith of series ten, who was 23 at the time.

In October 2025, she joined the line-up on Richard Osman's House of Games.

Strictly Come Dancing performances

Week #	Dance / Song	Judges' scores					Result
Week #	Dance / Song	Horwood	Mabuse	Ballas	Du Beke	Total	Result
1	Jive / "Can't Tame Her"	7	8	7	7	29	No elimination
2	Foxtrot / "Perfect"	8	8	7	8	31	Safe
3	Viennese waltz / "Waiting on a Miracle"	8	9	8	8	33	Safe
4	Samba / "Copacabana"	7	7	7	7	28	Safe
5	Paso doble / "Insomnia"	9	10	9	9	37	Safe
6	Salsa / "Murder on the Dancefloor"	9	10	10	9	38	Safe
7	American Smooth / "Ain't That a Kick in the Head?"	9	10	10	10	39	Safe
8	Rumba / "True Colors"	8	9	9	9	35	Safe
9	Charleston / "Love Machine"	9	10	10	10	39	Safe
10	Argentine tango / "Bills"	9	10	10	9	38	Safe
11	Quickstep / "Belle"	9	9	9	9	36	No elimination
12	Cha-cha-cha / "Mambo Italiano"; Street/Commercial / "Blow Your Mind" & "Physical"	9; 9	10; 9	9; 10	9; 10	37; 38	Safe
13	Paso doble / "Insomnia"; Freestyle / Jennifer Lopez megamix American Smooth / "Ain't That a Kick in the Head?"	9; 9; 10	10; 9; 10	10; 9; 10	10; 9; 10	39; 36; 40	WINNER

== Filmography ==
Year	Title	Role	Notes	Ref.
2009	A Boy Called Dad	Katie	Film role	
2010	Moving On	Stacy	Episode: "I Am Darleen Fyles"	
2011–2023	Coronation Street	Faye Windass	Series regular	
2012	Coronation Street: A Christmas Corrie	Faye Windass	Television short	
2015	The Sound of Music Live	Nun ensemble	Television film	
2023	Strictly Come Dancing	Herself	Winner; series 21	
2024	Drama Queens	Herself		
2025	Richard Osman's House of Games	Herself		
2026	The Good Ship Murder	Mimi McQueen	Guest character, Series 3	

== Stage credits ==
Year	Title	Role	Notes	Ref.
2024	Cluedo 2	Miss Scarlett	UK tour	
2026	The Ladies Football Club by Stefano Massini	Brianna	Sheffield Crucible	

== Awards and nominations ==
Year	Award	Category	Work	Result	Ref(s)
2013	2013 British Soap Awards	Best Young Performance	Coronation Street	Nominated	
2013	Inside Soap Awards	Best Young Actor	Coronation Street	Nominated	
2014	Inside Soap Awards	Best Young Actor	Coronation Street	Nominated	
2015	2015 British Soap Awards	Best Young Performance	Coronation Street	Nominated	
2015	Inside Soap Awards	Best Young Actor	Coronation Street	Nominated	
