= Ryan Prescott (actor) =

English actor (born 1989)

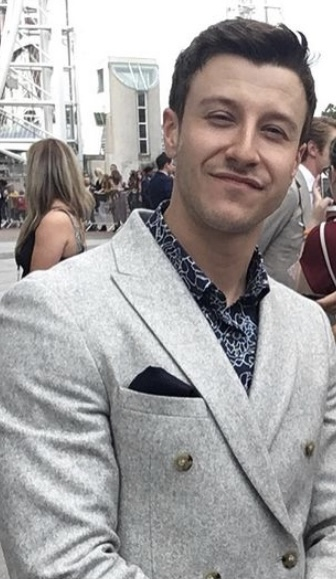
- Prescott in 2019
- Born: 21 January 1989 (age 37); Southport, England
- Occupation: Actor
- Years active: 2010–present
- Television: Emmerdale; Doctors; Coronation Street
- Partner: Amy Lythgoe

Ryan Prescott (born 21 January 1989) is an English actor from Southport, England, who plays Ryan Connor on the ITV soap opera Coronation Street. He previously played the role of Flynn Buchanan in fellow ITV soap opera Emmerdale in 2011, as well as Liam Slade in the BBC soap opera Doctors.

== Career ==
Prescott's first television credit was in Marchlands as Mark Ashburn, before making a guest appearance on Holby City. He then began to appear in the ITV soap opera Emmerdale as Flynn Buchanan. He went on to make brief appearances in The Syndicate, Vampire Academy and Casualty. In 2015 Ryan took over for Khan Bonfils, who died during rehearsals for Dante's Inferno A Modern Telling. In 2017, he then appeared in a documentary on the European Refugee Crisis, Dog Years, as himself. Prescott then began appearing in a recurring role on the BBC daytime soap opera Doctors as Liam Slade, with appearances in 2013 and 2018. Prescott also appeared in a Coca-Cola advertisement in 2013. In 2018, Prescott joined the cast of Coronation Street as Ryan Connor, becoming the third actor to play the role, replacing Sol Heras.

== Personal life ==
Prescott is in a relationship with actress Amy Lythgoe.

== Legal Issues ==
In 2024, footballer Joe Bunney claimed that Prescott and partner Amy Lythgoe were squatting in a property that belonged to Bunney, after their tenancy agreement had come to an end. This left Bunney’s grandfather, who was planning to move into the property, homeless. Prescott ‘strongly denied’ these claims, and along with Lythgoe, filed a £60,000 libel and defamation case against Bunney at the High Court.

== Filmography ==
Year	Title	Role	Notes
2011	Emmerdale	Flynn Buchanan	Recurring role; 12 episodes
2011	Marchlands	Mark Ashburn	3 episodes
2011	Holby City	Gavin Ruskin	Episode: "All Good Things"
2012	Gatecrasher	Mark	Short film
2013	The Syndicate	Aaron Styles	Episode #2.4
2013, 2018	Doctors	Liam Slade	Recurring role; 14 episodes
2014	Vampire Academy	Novice Punk Nick	Film
2014	Casualty	Drew Whitmore	Episode: "In the Name of Love"
2017	Dog Years	Himself	Documentary
2018–present	Coronation Street	Ryan Connor	Regular role
2020	Chapter 2: Zach	Zach	Short film

== Awards and nominations ==
Year	Award	Category	Work	Result	Ref.
2018	2018 British Soap Awards	Villain of the Year	Doctors	Nominated	
2023	2023 British Soap Awards	Best Leading Performer	Coronation Street	Nominated	
2023	National Television Awards	Serial Drama Performance	Coronation Street	Nominated	
2023	Inside Soap Awards	Best Actor	Coronation Street	Nominated	
