= Sean Gallagher (actor) =

British actor (born 1965)

- Born: Sean Campbell Gallagher; 2 September 1965 (age 60); Luton, Bedfordshire, England
- Occupation: Actor
- Years active: 1991–present

Sean Campbell Gallagher (born 2 September 1965) is a British actor, best known for his role of Paul Connor in Coronation Street.

== Career ==
Gallagher appeared in EastEnders from 1992 to 1993 as a playboy called Clive who had an affair with then-married Sam Mitchell.

In 1997 Gallagher played the role of Alan in the BAFTA-winning BBC series "Holding On" by Tony Marchant.

In 2006 he played the part of Chip in the second new series of Doctor Who opposite David Tennant in the episode "New Earth". In 2006, Gallagher signed on to Coronation Street to play the part of Paul Connor, one of two brothers buying a share in Underworld, the local knicker factory. In early 2007, Gallagher resigned from the Manchester-based ITV programme to pursue other roles, eventually leaving Coronation Street in June 2007.

On 2 July 2007, it was announced Gallagher had been cast for the lead role of Mal Faith in a new ITV drama series, Rock Rivals, produced by Shed Productions. He starred alongside former EastEnders actress Michelle Collins who played his wife, Karina Faith.

He appeared in a production of Mary Stuart for the Traverse Theatre, Edinburgh, with David Oakes and Penny Layden.

He performed in The Black Album at the Cottesloe Theatre/National Theatre in London's South Bank in 2009 and then started a national UK tour with the cast throughout the UK in October/November 2009.

He also voiced one of the characters in The Happy Prince, a stop-animation film, produced by Skatedog Films and directed by John Horabin in 2009. This newly released adaptation of the classic Oscar Wilde short story was featured at the BFI in London in autumn 2009.

He also appeared in the ITV dramas Eternal Law and Leaving and BBC drama Our Girl.

In 2017, he appeared in the Midsomer Murders episode "Red in Tooth & Claw" as Errol Judd, and in 2019, in Father Brown episode "The Sacrifice of Tantalus" as Len Blaisen.

== Activism ==
Gallagher is known to support animal welfare societies. In August 2008, Gallagher appeared as a celebrity contestant on an episode of Who Wants to Be a Millionaire, raising funds for World Animal Protection project to end bear dancing in India, "an issue that he feels strongly about."

== Filmography ==
=== Film ===
Year	Title	Role	Notes
1994	Jock: A True Tale of Friendship	Percy Fitzpatrick	
1996	La Passione	Jo	
1999	Elephant Juice	Billy	
2000	Offending Angels	Clive	
2002	Making a Killing	Chad Wiley	
2019	The Rest of Us	Craig Hayes (Father)	

=== Television ===
Year	Title	Role	Notes
1992	The Guilty	Eddy Doyle	Television film
1992	Boon	Tony Heard	Episode: "Minder"
1993	EastEnders	Clive	Episode dated 2 February 1993
1993	The Bill	Mick West	Episode: "Hypocritical Oath"
1993	Peak Practice	Ian Hilliard	Episode: "Giddy Heights"
1994	Casualty	Bill Truman	Episode: "Care in the Community"
1994	Murder Most Horrid	Sean Lacey	Episode: "Lady Luck"
1994	The House of Windsor	Ray Barker	6 episodes
1996	Christmas	Sean	Television film
1996	The Tenant of Wildfell Hall	Hargrave	3 episodes
1996, 2014	Silent Witness	DI John Brooke / Daniel Finn	4 episodes
1997	Touching Evil	Carl Burgess	Episode: "Killing with Kindness: Part 1"
1997	Noah's Ark	Chris	Episode: "Live and Learn"
1997	Holding On	Alan	4 episodes
1998	Heat of the Sun	Chico de Ville	3 episodes
1998	Earth: Final Conflict	Advanced Drone #2	Episode: "Fissures"
1999	Extremely Dangerous	DI Danny Ford	4 episodes
2000	Border Cafe	David	8 episodes
2001–2002	Linda Green	Jimmy McKenzie	10 episodes
2001, 2002	Micawber	Henry	2 episodes
2002	Clocking Off	Neil	Episode: "Jenny's Story"
2002	Ella and the Mothers	George	Television film
2004	Island at War	Sheldon Leveque	6 episodes
2004	Murder Prevention	DC Neil Stanton	6 episodes
2005	Class of '76	Colin Somerville	Television film
2006	Doctor Who	Chip	Episode: "New Earth"
2006	New Street Law	Tony Burgess	2 episodes
2006–2007	Coronation Street	Paul Connor	103 episodes
2008	Rock Rivals	Malcolm Faith	8 episodes
2008	Heartbeat	DS Harry Siddons	Episode: "Guilty Secrets"
2009	Holby City	Phil Goodridge	Episode: "Just a Perfect Day"
2011	Death in Paradise	Phil Owen	Episode: "An Unhelpful Aid"
2012	Eternal Law	Dave	Episode #1.2
2012	Walking and Talking	Pretty Nun	4 episodes
2012	Leaving	Michael	3 episodes
2013–2014	Our Girl	Dave Dawes	3 episodes
2017	Midsomer Murders	Errol Judd	Episodes: "Red in Tooth & Claw"
2019	Father Brown	Len Blaisen	Episode: "The Sacrifice of Tantalus"
2022	Five Days at Memorial	Dr. Elwood McGee	Episode: "45 Dead"
