= Sol Heras =

English actor

- Born: 8 October 1987 (age 38); Cheshire, England
- Occupation: Actor
- Years active: 2007–2016
- Television: Coronation Street (2012–2013)

Sol Heras (born 8 October 1987) is an English actor. He was the second actor to portray the character Ryan Connor in the ITV soap opera Coronation Street, from 2012 until 2013. He replaced Ben Thompson, and in turn was replaced by Ryan Prescott in 2018.

== Early life ==
Heras was born on 8 October 1987, and raised in Cheshire.

== Career ==
In 2007, he was cast in the scripted talent show drama Rock Rivals as one of the contestants, Luke Ellis. He replaced a previous unnamed actor at the filming stages. The series aired in 2008 and was the actor's first television appearance. Unlike co-star Holly Quin-Ankrah, Heras did not provide his character's singing voice. For the singing sequences Heras's voice was dubbed by that of Swedish session singer Emil Heiling. Heras however, was still given vocal coaching and was taught how to lip-sync. Following his role in Rock Rivals Heras was cast in the feature horror film Splintered as a "stoner" and "chilled out character who doesn't really care".

He also appeared in two episodes of the third series of Hollyoaks Later, a late night spin-off from the Channel 4 soap opera Hollyoaks, as Dean Stanley. In 2010, he played Zavi in the fifth episode of BBC Three situational comedy The Gemma Factor.

In May 2012, it was confirmed that Heras had been cast in the role of Ryan Connor in the long-running ITV soap opera Coronation Street. He became the second actor to portray the role, as he replaced Ben Thompson, who declined the opportunity to reprise his role, having been axed two years previously. Series producer, Phil Collinson, described Heras as "a brilliant young actor" and that he was "excited to welcome him to the cast". Heras received a positive reception amongst journalists, but on 21 July 2013, just after a year taking on the role, Heras announced his departure from the show, leaving the programme at the end of his contract.

The character returned to Coronation Street in May 2018, but not portrayed by Heras. Instead, former Emmerdale actor Ryan Prescott replaced him, after new producer Kate Oates decided to recast the role.

In the 2014 film Viking - The Berserkers (forthcoming), Sol Heras takes the lead role. This film heads back to the Dark Ages when a group of five young Saxons are captured by a clan of fearsome Viking warriors, used as prey in a ritualistic manhunt. High on a potion that turns them "berserk", the brutal hunters are soon on the scent of the terrified youngsters in a desperate battle for survival from the ritualistic manhunt. Written and directed by Welsh film-maker Antony Smith.

== Filmography ==
Year	Title	Role	Notes
2008	Rock Rivals	Luke Ellis	Series regular
2010	Splintered	John	Feature film
2010	Hollyoaks Later	Dean Stanley	Two episodes of series three
2010	The Gemma Factor	Zavi	Episode #1.5
2012–2013	Coronation Street	Ryan Connor	Series regular
2014	Viking - The Berserkers	Wade	Lead role
2015	The Service	Alex	Short film
2016	Late Shift	Jeffery	1 episode
