= Brooke Vincent =

English actress (born 1992)

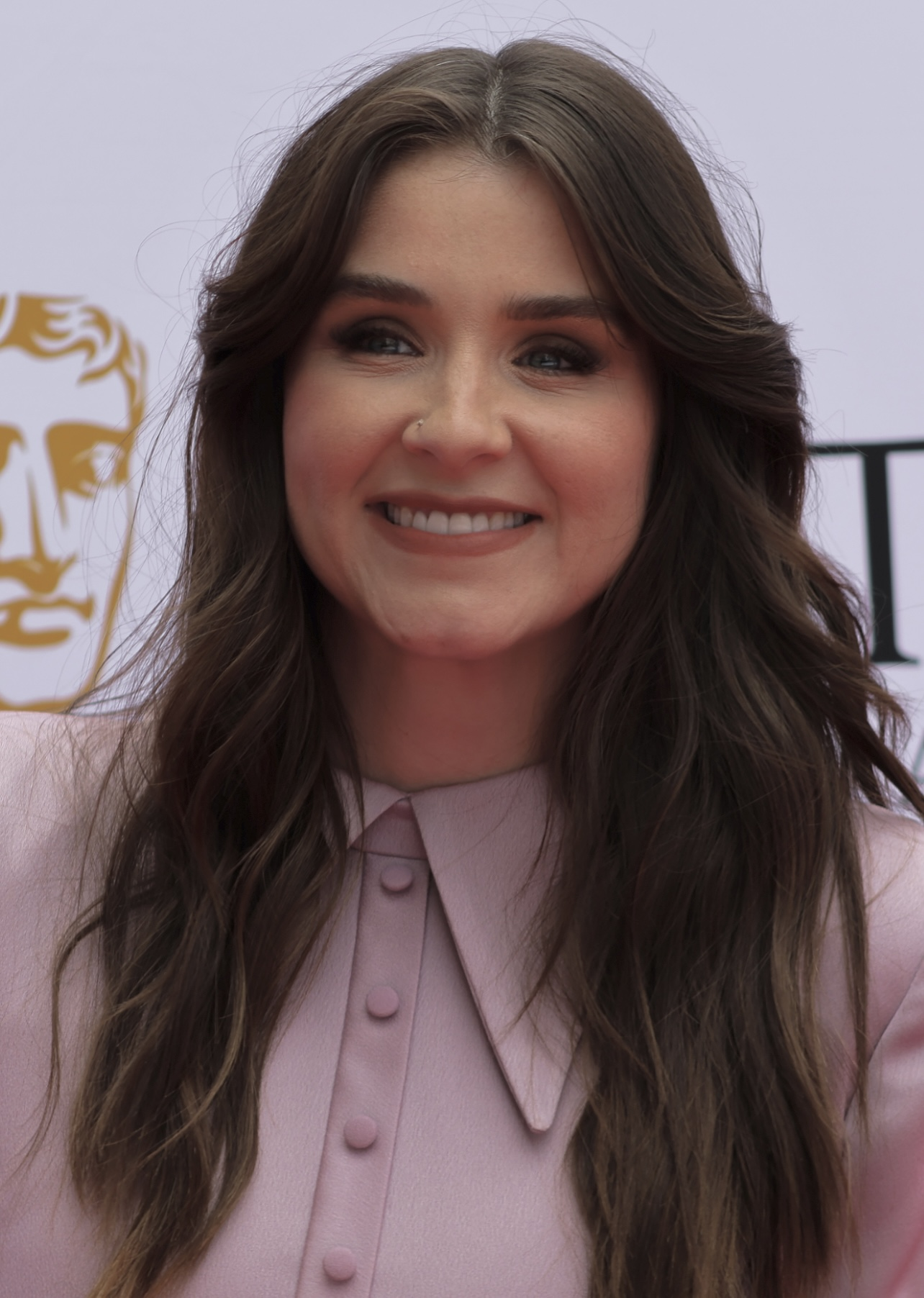
- Vincent in 2026
- Born: Brooke Levi Vincent; 4 June 1992 (age 34); Audenshaw, Greater Manchester, England
- Occupation: Actress
- Years active: 2002–2019, 2022-present
- Employer: Lime Pictures (2026-)
- Television: Coronation Street (2004–2019); Dancing on Ice (2018)
- Height: 157 cm (5 ft 2 in)
- Partner(s): Kean Bryan (2016–2026)
- Children: 2
- Relatives: Ellie Leach (cousin)

Brooke Levi Vincent (Note: per her Instagram account (see #External links), her full name is Brooke Levi Vincent) (born 4 June 1992) is an English actress. She is known for her role as Sophie Webster in the ITV soap-opera Coronation Street (2004–2019). She has since appeared in the Channel 4 soap opera Hollyoaks (2026).

== Early life ==
Vincent was born in Audenshaw, Greater Manchester, England to Nicola Anderton, a crime scene officer for Greater Manchester Police, and Anthony Vincent, a tour guide in Tenerife. Her parents separated when she was two; she was raised by her mother and her stepfather, John McDermott. Vincent has a paternal older half-brother, Zak, and a younger maternal half-sister, Maisie. Vincent is the cousin of Ellie Leach, a fellow Coronation Street actress, who plays Faye Windass; Vincent was said to be "overjoyed" by Leach's casting in the soap.

Vincent attended Fairfield High School for Girls in Droylsden and The Manchester College, where she gained a National Diploma in Acting.

== Career ==
Vincent's first television appearance was as a guest character, Casey Emma Glass, in the TV series The League of Gentlemen. Shortly after landing the role of Sophie in Coronation Street, she appeared on Children in Need. In 2018, Vincent competed in the tenth series of Dancing on Ice and finished in second place, alongside professional partner Matej Silecky.

=== Coronation Street ===
Vincent joined the long-running British soap-opera Coronation Street in April 2004 as the third actress to play Sophie Webster, replacing Emma Woodward, who had decided to leave the soap at the end of 2003. Vincent's first appearance was shown on 12 May.

In an interview on 7 September 2010 with Vincent and Sacha Parkinson, both actresses discussed their roles in the lesbian storyline, whereby their relationship transformed from best friends to girlfriends with the realisation of their sexuality. This storyline on started on 11 April 2010. At the Stonewall Awards ceremony on 5 November 2010, Coronation Street won the new Broadcast of the Year award, in recognition of its gay storylines. Vincent was nominated for Best Dramatic Performance from a Young Actor or Actress for her portrayal of Sophie at The British Soap Awards in 2008. At the 2008 Inside Soap Awards, Vincent was nominated in the category Best Young Actor. In October 2019, Vincent took maternity leave from the show.

=== Other ventures ===
In 2018, Vincent launched her own stationery brand, Oh So B. From 5 June 2023, she stood in for Gemma Atkinson on Hits Radio alongside Mike Toolan whilst Atkinson was on maternity leave. Vincent's first three stationery planners were named after her half-sister and her cousins.

== Personal life ==
Vincent has been in a relationship with footballer Kean Bryan since 2016, and the couple have two sons.

In 2018, Vincent revealed that she had stopped smoking after ten years. In April 2019, Vincent announced that she was pregnant with her first child. On 23 October 2019, Vincent gave birth to a boy. In November 2020, Vincent announced she was pregnant with her second child. On 4 May 2021, she gave birth to her second son.

In 2026, it was reported that Vincent and her fiancé of 10 years, Kean Bryan, had split.

== Filmography ==
=== Television ===
Year	Title	Role	Notes
2002	The League of Gentlemen	Casey Glass	1 episode: "The Medusa Touch"
2004–2019	Coronation Street	Sophie Webster	Series Regular
2005	Coronation Street: Pantomime	Sophie Webster	TV movie
2006–2007	Soapstar Superstar	Herself	3 episodes
2014	Tricked	Herself	1 episode
2016	I'm a Celebrity: Extra Camp	Herself	2 episodes
2016	Tipping Point: Lucky Stars	Herself	1 episode
2016	Blankety Blank	Herself	Christmas special
2018	Dancing on Ice	Herself	Contestant (Runner Up)
2019	Celebrity Catchphrase	Herself	1 episode
2024	Drama Queens	Herself	
2026–	Hollyoaks	Abigail Matthews	Series Regular

=== Film ===
Year	Title	Role	Notes
2008	Coronation Street: Out of Africa	Sophie Webster	Direct-to-video
2018	Chapter 1: Liv	Olivia	Short film
2019	My Toughest Battle	Gemma	Short film
2019	Chapter 2: Zach	Olivia	Short film
