= Pam Hobsworth =

Fictional character from Coronation Street

- Coronation Street character
- Portrayed by: Kate Anthony
- Duration: 2008–12
- First appearance: 16 July 2008
- Last appearance: 3 May 2012
- Introduced by: Steve Frost
In-universe information
- Other names: Pam Compton; Auntie Pam
- Occupation: Saleswoman
- Brothers: Diggory Compton
- Husband: Geoff Hobsworth (backstory)
- Nieces: Molly Dobbs
- Other relatives: Jack Webster

Pam Hobsworth is a fictional character from the British soap opera Coronation Street, played by Kate Anthony. She initially appeared between 2008 and 2010, before making guest stints in 2011 and 2012. The character has been referred to as Auntie Pam in the media and in the soap itself. Anthony was happy to be cast on the soap and she attributed it to helping her career by raising her profile; however, she found it difficult as she had to leave her family in London. Pam was introduced as the aunt of established character Molly Dobbs (Vicky Binns) and she later became a love interest for Bill Webster (Peter Armitage). Binns praised the character and believed that Pam and Molly had a really honest relationship. Pam was characterised as being a wheeler-dealer, with one of her first storyline seeing her almost die in an explosion after she tries to create biofuel. Pam then became the first regular character on the soap to find out that married Molly is having an affair with Bill's son, Kevin Webster (Michael Le Vell), and she initially is angry with Molly but later supports her. Pam later blames Kevin for Molly's death and becomes engaged to Bill. Anthony became recognised for the role and the character received mixed reception from critics.

== Casting and development ==
Pam Hobsworth was portrayed by actress Kate Anthony. She originally joined the soap opera in 2008 for six months. After securing the role, Anthony had to leave her family in London to go back and forth to Manchester, which the actress found to be the hardest thing about working on the soap. Pam's first scene involved the character selling ham. Reflecting on the role in 2016, Anthony revealed, "People still recognise me as Auntie Pam, I was lucky she was nice. I loved it, the people were great and it was great fun". Anthony also attributed the soap for helping her getting acting roles after she left, as she believed that being on Coronation Street "raises your profile".

Pam was introduced as the aunt of established character Molly Dobbs (Vicky Binns). The character has been referred to as "Auntie Pam". Pam was described as a being a "wannabe entrepreneur" and she works hard to make money through scams. Pam tries to "cash in" on the Great Recession and tries to make homemade biofuel. Pam and Darryl Morton (Jonathan Dixon) turn Jack Duckworth's (Bill Tarmey) outside loo into a warehouse for the product, and the pair have a drink to celebrate their "bold venture". When Jack starts to suspect that somethings strange is going on, Pam and Darryl try to shift the stock to protect their plan. In scenes set on New Years Eve 2008, "disaster strikes" when the biofuel ignites and explodes, which destroys Jack's chicken coup and knocks Pam out. Pam is rushed to hospital and Molly waits "anxiously" to find out if Pam will pull through. Whilst it was confirmed by Inside Soap that Jack's chickens would survive, it was not announced prior whether Pam would make it, with the magazine teasing that the plot could result in tragedy. Pam survives and later begins a romantic relationship with Bill Webster (Peter Armitage).

Pam was the first regular character on the soap to find out that Molly is cheating on her husband, Tyrone Dobbs (Alan Halsall), with Bill's son, Kevin Webster (Michael Le Vell), who is married to Sally Webster (Sally Dynevor). Pam initially becomes suspicious when Molly lies that her father is ill to get time off from work to be with Kevin and she believes that Molly is lying. Pam then "gets the shock of her life" when she finds Molly kissing Kevin in his pickup truck and confronts her about it, where she gives Molly an ultimatum to either end the affair or tell Tyrone. Molly lies to Pam that the affair is over, but she is shocked when she finds out that the affair has been rekindled and "genuinely angry" that Molly has been lying to her. Binns believed that Pam was trying to protect Molly by believing her that the affair is over, and that Molly knows that ultimately Pam will be on her side and not reveal the affair. Binns told Digital Spy that she loved the character of Pam as "she's straight down the line" and that her relationship with Molly is "really honest, she's probably the only person who doesn't flower things up and they just speak really honestly with each other". Binns also found it interesting that Pam was the character to know about the affair as Pam is "on the periphery of Molly's life and indeed the storyline. She's a bit of an oracle and I think she's just there as a rock". Despite her initial anger, Pam supports Molly through her ordeal. Pam later blames Kevin when Molly is killed in the tram crash, the night where she left Tyrone. Pam leaves after Molly's funeral in December 2010, and it is later revealed that she has gone travelling with Bill.

In July 2011, it was announced that Anthony had reprised the role and that Pam would reappear on the soap that September. Inside Soap teased that Pam would be "revealing some big news" and would also clash with another character. It was later reported that Pam would be returning with Bill, with Armitage also returning for another stint on the soap. Anthony and Armitage had previously been axed by new executive producer Phil Collinson, who reportedly had a "change of heart" and decided to bring the characters back. Discussing her return, Anthony told Yorkshire Evening Post, "I'm back - and with a good storyline too. It's just like I've never been away. We film out of sequence so often one has to keep checking the narrative. It's quite tricky and I'm constantly making notes on my script. They have already had Halloween decorations on the set, so one is working ahead all the time. It's also quite difficult with costumes because they put you in winter clothes when it's hot, and summer clothes when it's cold". In the storyline, Pam and Bill return from travelling to announce that they are engaged. However, Pam clashes with Kevin and remains "at odds" with due to his "destructive" affair with Molly, as Pam blames him for Molly's death in the tram crash, and thus she does not allow him near to her wedding with his father. This has "shocking consequences" when the stress ends up causing Bill to have a heart attack. Anthony initially reappeared for a short stint, but she revealed that Pam would reappear that December too. Anthony then took a break to appear in a pantomime before returning to filming in January 2011. The actress teased that viewers would continue seeing her character for some time, adding, "Now that I'm well and truly in, they'll have to remove me by my nails from the Rovers Return bar to get me out!"

In March 2012, it was reported that Anthony would return as Pam for a four-episode stint the following month. In the storyline, Pam arrives in Weatherfield in order to visit Kevin and his family. Kevin then asks her to help him with his and Molly's son, Jack Webster. Kevin considers giving Jack away to Pam so that he can rebuild his relationship with Sally, but he later decides against it.

== Storylines ==
Pam first appears selling ham to Blanche Hunt (Maggie Jones) in the Rovers Return Inn pub. Pam then bumps into her niece, Molly Compton (Vicky Binns), in the pub, and they recognise each other instantly. Pam then buys Molly's boyfriend, Tyrone Dobbs (Alan Halsall), a Fabergé egg to use to propose to Molly. Pam stays at Molly's house with Jack Duckworth (Bill Tarmey) and Tyrone, who insist that she stays when she offers to leave, not wanting to outstay her welcome. Pam lies that her husband is dead, but she later tells Molly that he had actually thrown her out for having an affair. Pam starts Tyrone to make more money to afford a lavish wedding and argues with his mother, Jackie Dobbs, (Margi Clarke), when she upsets the couple. Molly walks out on Tyrone when she finds out that he has been selling Pam's cheap merchandise for her, which makes him furious with Pam. Pam tries to convert the chip fat fuel into fuel, but when she is moving it an explosion occurs. She is knocked unconscious but make a full recovery. Pam continues selling cheap goods to be able to buy a chicken coup for Jack and she gets Jack to drop off a pair of sunglasses for her hours before his wedding to Molly. At the exchange, the man is revealed to be Whispering Geoff, Pam's old boyfriend, and he demands to Tyrone give him the stuff for free or else he will be arrested, which makes Tyrone angry at her. Pam arranges for Molly and Tyrone to spend a week in a caravan in Blackpool after Jackie steals their honeymoon tickets to Paris, but Molly is unimpressed.

Pam starts dating Bill Webster (Peter Armitage) after meeting him at a Singles Night. Pam finds out that Molly is having an affair with Tyrone's best friend and Bill's son, Kevin Webster (Michael Le Vell). She gives Molly the ultimatum to tell Tyrone or end the affair, so Molly lies that she has stopped seeing Kevin. Months later, Pam is furious when she finds out that Molly lied to her and that she is now pregnant with Kevin's baby. She accuses Molly of lying about being pregnant to get Kevin to leave his wife, Sally Webster (Sally Dynevor), and their children, and slaps Molly for her treatment of Tyrone. However, she supports Molly and blames Kevin despite initially defending him. Pam returns after Molly gives birth to her and Kevin's son, Jack. She later attends his christening and supports Molly as she is still in love with Kevin, who is no longer interested. Pam returns when she finds out that Molly has died from injuries sustained in the tram crash, which devastates her. Pam confronts Kevin as she believes that he is to blame for Molly's death, and she leaves to comfort her brother and Molly's father, Diggory Compton (Eric Potts). Pam attends Molly's funeral, where Tyrone is furious at her after finding out that she and Bill knew about Molly and Kevin's affair.

Bill and Pam go travelling but return months later and announced that they are engaged. Pam continues to hold a grudge against Kevin, blaming him for Molly's death, and bans him from attending the wedding. The stress of this causes Bill to have a heart attack, so Pam and Kevin put their feelings aside and support Bill whilst he recovers. Pam is also saddened when she finds out that Kevin is living with Sally again and planning to change Jack's surname from "Dobbs" to "Webster". It is mentioned that Pam had been divorced four times due to her infidelity in three of the marriages. She and Bill later attend a memorial service for the first anniversary of the tram crash, and weeks later they attend the wedding of Bill's granddaughter Sophie Webster (Brooke Vincent) to Sian Powers (Sacha Parkinson), which does not go ahead. Pam visits months later and tells Sally that she is a fool for trusting Kevin again, as they are planning to get back together. Kevin later asks Pam to look after Jack full-time as he feels that Jack is a constant reminder of his affair, but he later decides against this as he does not want to give up his son. Pam and Bill later split up and Jack continues to stay with Pam over the years.

== Reception ==
Helen Childs from Inside Soap called Pam a "wheeler-dealing auntie" and a "wannabe entrepreneur" who was "hard at work" when she tried to make homemade biofuel, which they called a "hare-brained scheme". Childs also called Pam and Darryl a "dozy duo" and joked how Pam's "latest moneymaking scam" literally blew up in her face. In 2010, Dan Martin from The Guardian speculated that Pam could be one of the characters to be killed-off in the soap's 50th anniversary special, as he believed that the "primary function of a big soap disaster is to sweep out the dead wood", and that Pam was one of the "characters we don't care about even if we noticed they were there". Whilst reporting Pam's 2011 return, Daniel Kilkelly from Digital Spy called Pam a "Coronation Street favourite" and believed that her return was "good news" for fans of the soap. Katie Fitzpatrick from Manchester Evening News called Pam the "meddling aunt" of Molly. Fitzpatrick also wrote that Anthony was "best known" for portraying Pam on the soap. Francine White from The Jewish Chronicle believed that Pam's first scene – which saw her selling ham – was ironic due to Anthony being Jewish. Vicki Newman from the Daily Mirror noted how Pam "was there through all the drama" of Molly and Kevin's affair. Newman's colleague, Vikki White, called the character "lovable wheeler dealer Aunty Pam". When Anthony debuted as Hazel in another British soap opera, Emmerdale, in 2021, viewers expressed their surprise on social media due to recognising the actress from her role as Pam.
