= Jackie Dobbs =

Fictional character from Coronation Street

- Coronation Street character
- Portrayed by: Margi Clarke
- Duration: 1998–1999, 2008–2010
- First appearance: Episode 4376; 29 March 1998
- Last appearance: Episode 7296; 18 March 2010
- Introduced by: Brian Park (1998); Kim Crowther (2008, 2010)
In-universe information
- Occupation: Career criminal/Gangster
- Husband: Darren Dobbs
- Adoptive sons: Tyrone Dobbs
- Granddaughters: Ruby Dobbs (adoptive)

Jackie Dobbs is a fictional character from the British ITV soap opera Coronation Street played by Margi Clarke. She was introduced in 1998, but written out in 1999 due to the personal problems of the actress who played her. Nine years later, in 2008, the character was reintroduced, once again played by Clarke, who initially signed a two-month contract. Jackie continued to make sporadic appearances until March 2010. The character was then killed-off in 2018.

== Creation and development ==
=== Characterisation ===
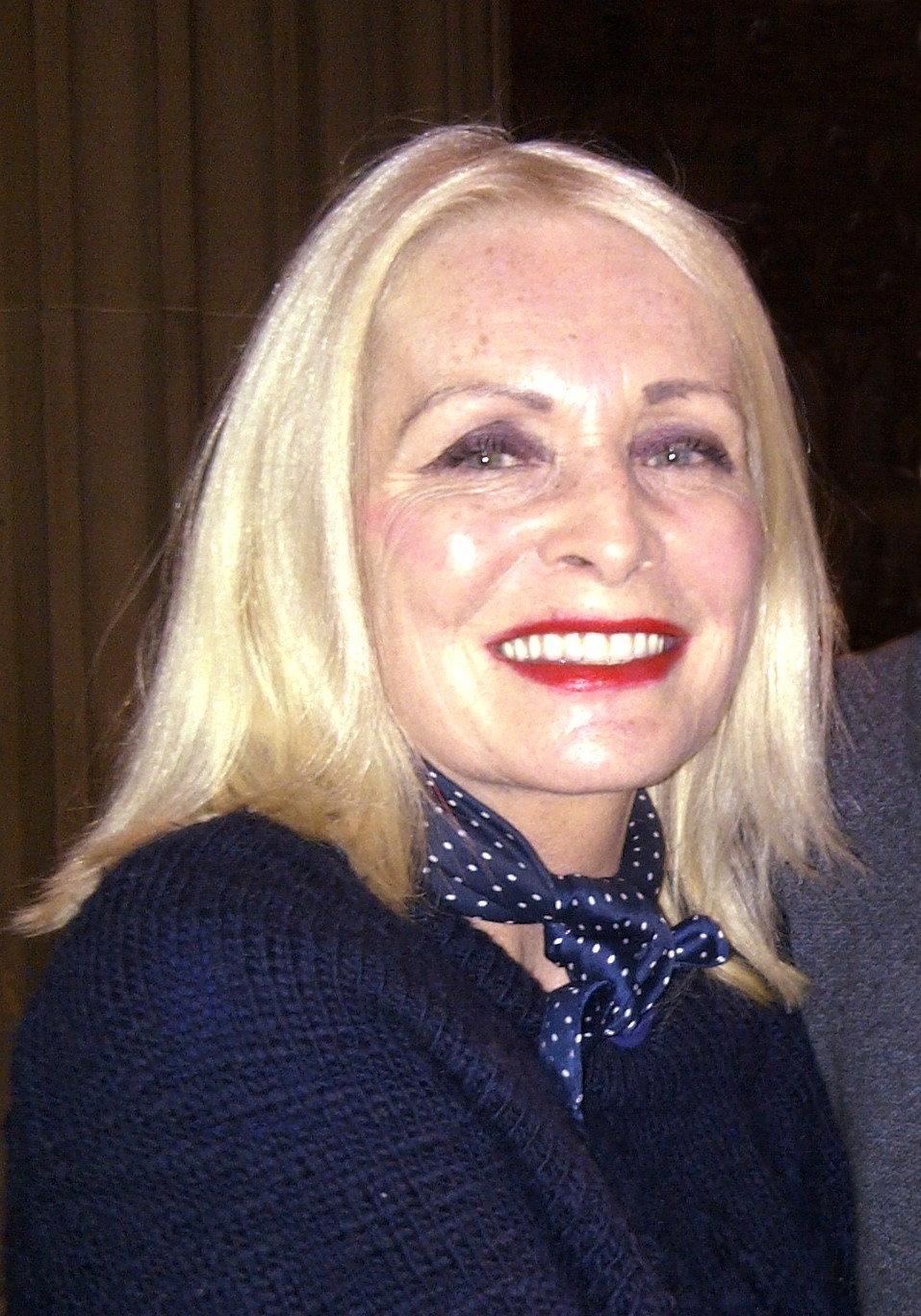
Margi Clarke (pictured) got the role of Jackie in 1998. She was axed a year later, due to her personal problems affecting her work.

Margi Clarke has described the character of Jackie: "I don’t think she’s vile – there’s definitely a heart beating in Jackie. She has an obvious intelligence but she’s not had opportunities in life and has made some mistakes. She’s a born survivor but doesn’t know how to play straight" Discussing Jackie's severed relationship with her son Tyrone, Clarke said "She's not the best mother in the world. Even though she's trying to spiritually develop herself, there is a side that's under-developed, a side that thinks only about herself. It makes the character interesting, though. I think that Jackie realises that Tyrone's going to do what she never did - that he's going to get it right first time. I think he'll stay with Molly - he's one of those lads that wants to correct what his mother's done. Mother and father split up, mother being with all kinds of fellas. I think that's how he wants to live - he's a one woman guy".

Speaking of the apparent changes her character underwent in 2008, Clarke said "on the outside she's a reformed character. She's into yoga and natural living, but deep down, Jackie Dobbs is going to burst back out again. She's mellowed a little bit, though. I think it's the pink hair."

=== Departure (1999) ===
Off-screen, actress Margi Clarke was axed from Coronation Street due to personal problems that interfered with her work. Clarke explains, "[My mother] was a Corrie fan and I was still grieving for her when I first appeared on the show. As a result, I don’t think I played the part to the best of my ability."

=== Reintroduction (2008) ===
In 2008, producers decided to reintroduce the character of Jackie, 9 years after she had last appeared. They initially considered recasting the role, however, Liverpudian scriptwriter Carmel Morgan spoke up for Margi Clarke at a writers meeting, saying that "Margi's in a great place right now, she looks fantastic, she's healthy, very positive, and would love to make up for her shortcomings last time". So, she was asked to re-audition for the role. Clarke was sent scripts to rehearse for the audition, however, as no scripts for Jackie's return had been finalised, Clarke was sent a script for a character named auntie Pam, Molly Compton's relation. Mistakenly believing that she was being asked to audition for a new character, the sister of Jackie, Clarke dyed her hair bright pink to make her visually different from Jackie, who was known to viewers for her peroxide blonde hair. The look impressed the directors and after a successful audition, Jackie Dobbs was brought back with pink hair. She initially signed a two-month contract and appeared in the lead up to her son's engagement to Molly Compton.

Speaking about her comeback, Margi Clarke has said

When I got the phone call, I was crying tears of joy out of my living room window. It was nine years ago since I last walked the Cobbles, so I've been lost at sea for that long. It was like finding my way back to the land of milk and honey. I couldn't believe it. I'm delighted to be back, though [...] I'd always wanted to go back and I hoped that it would always be a possibility. Jackie Dobbs lived on. She was referred to every now and then, what with Tyrone being her son. If Tyrone wasn't there, I wouldn't be going back! Thanks God for my 'son'! Not many actors leave a soap. I left and I thought I was going to get a long run of work. With my character being quite an explosive one, I was never going to go into the corner shop and ask Dev for a loaf. Characters like mine don't tend to survive long because they're wild, but she's brilliant to play.

Clarke has vowed to take the soap more seriously after wasting her "golden opportunity" in the late 1990s. She said: "It's one of Britain's top soaps and to be called to play on that stage, it's on a par with being asked to play for England and you should really honour it, have the commitment and give it everything you've got. I'm 54 now, and I'm never going to look a gift horse in the mouth again."

It was confirmed in July 2018 that Tyrone would receive the news that Jackie had died in the coming weeks, ruling out a return for Clarke and giving Jackie an off-screen death.

== Storylines ==
Liverpudlian Jackie first appears in March 1998 as the cellmate of Deirdre Rachid (Anne Kirkbride), Jackie is in prison for ABH. Jackie's introduction was part of a high-profile storyline that saw Deirdre framed by her boyfriend and wrongfully imprisoned. Jackie first appears in a specially constructed prison cell at Granada Studios. Deirdre's conviction is quashed within three weeks and she is released; Jackie soon follows her to the soap's primary setting of Weatherfield on parole, needing a friend to turn to, having been dumped by her partner and left homeless. Jackie moves to the area with her teenage son Tyrone (Alan Halsall), squatting in Curly Watts' (Kevin Kennedy) vacant premises. She becomes a factory worker for Mike Baldwin (Johnny Briggs), where she has numerous run-ins with Janice Battersby (Vicky Entwistle) over flirtations with Janice's husband Les (Bruce Jones). Jackie leaves in the midst of a property feud with Curly, who had returned to find her formally renting his house. Jackie goes back to Liverpool with her husband Darren (James McMartin), though Tyrone stays behind as a lodger with Jack (Bill Tarmey) and Vera Duckworth (Liz Dawn).

Tyrone contacts Jackie about his engagement in August 2008. Jackie appears to be living in a nice home with a cat and claims to have turned over a New Age leaf, but she was actually only catsitting, and was being menaced by an ex-boyfriend to whom she owed a £1000 debt. Tyrone and Molly Compton (Vicky Binns) give their wedding fund to pay her debt. Jackie asks for more money for travel far and she effectively disowns Tyrone when they refuse. She later goes to Tyrone's home in an attempt to see him, but is asked to leave by Molly's aunt Pam Hobsworth (Kate Anthony) and Jack.

Jackie returns again on New Year's Day 2009 ahead of the wedding of Molly and Tyrone. She claims to be in severe pain due to a ruptured breast implant. When Jack asks her to leave, she fakes a fainting spell. Molly looks up the details Jackie had given them and discovered nothing is wrong with her. She still decides to give Jackie another chance for Tyrone's sake. Her forgiving mood vanishes when Jackie shows up at the hen night and quickly gets drunk, encouraging Graeme Proctor (Craig Gazey) to do a striptease and groping one of the men hired to serve food until he asked to leave. Pam physically ejects Jackie. Jackie misses the wedding, but, wearing a dark wig, attends the reception at the Rovers. She is hurt that Tyrone had no kind words for her in his wedding speech. When Jackie reveals herself, Molly once again pledged to give Jackie another chance, for Tyrone's sake. Jackie perks up when she learns the newlyweds had received Eurostar tickets to Paris as a honeymoon gift. She manages to pocket the tickets without anyone noticing. As Jackie leaves during the night, she takes one final look at her son and his new wife, a brief hint of pride on her face at the man Tyrone had become.

Tyrone's relationship with Molly changes drastically in the year since he had seen his mother. Jackie learns of Molly and Tyrone's breakup when she calls and Jack's new girlfriend Connie Rathbone (Rita May), who knew nothing about Jackie, gives her some details. Jackie immediately returns to see Tyrone, and feeling that he has already lost so much, accepts her. Jackie confronts Molly for dumping Tyrone and accuses her of cheating. Molly denies it and insulted Jackie, prompting her to knock food off the shelves, so Molly throws her out and they fight in the street until Tyrone steps in and the police threaten to get involved. Jack and Connie later try to warn Tyrone about what Jackie is doing in his house but this infuriates him and he throws them out. Jackie tells Tyrone that she really did love him even if she had been a useless mother in the past but assures him that she is here for him now. However, she also falls back into old patterns of bringing men back for one night stands. Jackie is coming home when she sees Molly packing up some belongings. Molly insists that she is leaving Weatherfield, but Jackie is convinced that Molly was burgling the place. She drags Tyrone home, hoping this would be the last straw for his feelings towards Molly. Instead, Tyrone feels sorry for Molly and throws Jackie out, telling the cab that Molly had ordered to take Jackie anywhere but where he lives.

In July 2018, Tyrone receives news from the police that Jackie has died. In subsequent weeks, it transpires that Jackie and Darren were not Tyrone's biological parents, having found him as a baby outside a police station and registered him as their own, due to Jackie's desire to have children. This leads to Tyrone eventually discovering his long-lost grandmother Evelyn Plummer (Maureen Lipman) in September 2018, where she reveals that his mother and Evelyn's daughter, Cassandra (Claire Sweeney), gave birth to him as a teenager, before leaving for South Africa and had since died. However, this is later revealed to be a lie and Cassandra (now going by Cassie) is still alive.

== Reception ==
Discussing the character's reintroduction in 2008, Kris Green from entertainment website Digital Spy said, "It was a coup on Corrie's part when they managed to lure her back. Jackie's an excellent character and will hopefully bring back some of Corrie's 'energy' that it's been lacking of late." TV critic Christine Klabacher added, "Actress Margi Clarke threw herself into the role as always and brightened a rather dull week in the soap [...] characterisation was called for, and Margi obliged in bucketloads."
