= Molly Dobbs =

Fictional character from Coronation Street

- Coronation Street character
- Portrayed by: Vicky Binns
- Duration: 2005–2010
- First appearance: Episode 6108; 5 September 2005
- Last appearance: Episode 7487; 9 December 2010
- Created by: Tony Wood
- Book appearances: Coronation Street: The Complete Saga
In-universe information
- Other names: Molly Compton
- Occupation: Shop assistant
- Father: Diggory Compton
- Husband: Tyrone Dobbs (2009–2010)
- Sons: Jack Webster
- Aunts: Pam Hobsworth

Molly Dobbs (also Compton) is a fictional character from the British ITV soap opera Coronation Street. Played by Vicky Binns, she debuted on 5 September 2005. Introduced as the daughter of a local baker, she is the love interest and later wife of Tyrone Dobbs. On 6 May 2010, Binns announced she was quitting the soap. Molly was killed off on 9 December 2010 in a live episode celebrating the show's 50th anniversary, by a tram crashing into the corner shop.

== Creation ==
=== Background ===
The character of Molly was introduced as the daughter of local baker Diggory Compton (Eric Potts) in 2005. She was a former classmate of character Fiz Brown (Jennie McAlpine); Molly was very resentful against Fiz, who had bullied her at school. She worked in the bakery until her father's departure and worked briefly as a kennel-maid before becoming an assistant to Dev Alahan (Jimmi Harkishin) at the Corner Shop.

=== Casting ===
Vicky Binns was selected to join Coronation Street as a rival for at-the-time already established character Fiz. In real life, Binns is the best friend of McAlpine. She told the Manchester Evening News: "They brought me in to play her rival, which is ridiculous. It really requires some acting.". In April 2010 Binns announced that she had quit the show and will leave at the end of her contract which she did when she was killed off in the 50th anniversary when a tram crashed of the viaduct and destroyed the corner shop which Molly was in at the time.

== Development ==
=== Personality and identity ===
The Coronation Street official website described Molly as a bubbly, optimistic, friendly and outgoing character. She first arrived in Weatherfield after her father bought the bakery in May 2005. There were rumours that she would leave along with her father in July 2006, but she stayed on. Binns says she is grateful that her character appears to be "un-trendy". Molly's look changed a little at the beginning of 2008 after Binns went on a strict weight loss regime. The producer was supportive of Binns and did not mind changing Molly's appearance slightly. Binns stated in another interview that Molly is stubborn and that honesty is the element of a relationship she wants most, which was why she was reluctant to forgive Tyrone for his deception.

Another focal point of the character's style is the rucksack which she carried frequently. Binns once stated that she did not think her character would ever stop wearing it. Gareth McLean of the Radio times even joked that when Molly and Kevin Webster consummated their relationship, he doubted Molly would remove her rucksack.

=== Relationships ===
Molly's relationship with Tyrone Dobbs (Alan Halsall) began in 2006. Their relationship has been long-term and appeared perfect to begin with. After Molly moves into number 9 to be with Tyrone permanently she wants to take her relationship to the next level and forms a close bond with Vera Duckworth (Elizabeth Dawn) who Tyrone regarded as his mother. She even turns to her for advice on furthering her relationship with Tyrone, in scenes which Binns said were really funny. The media called the pairing the next 'Jack and Vera' with the show's bosses even stating their potential. Actress Vicky Binns stated in an interview that she was flattered but thought they could never replace the couple: "You can't really replace anyone like that. The show progresses and changes so much with new characters you don't even know if they'll keep Molly and Tyrone together. But I suppose Molly is quite bossy and, like Vera, will keep Tyrone under her thumb." The characters go on to buy their own home together and eventually get engaged. They hit one of their first difficulties when Molly finds out that Tyrone has been selling illegal goods with her Aunt, Pam Hobsworth (Kate Anthony). Vicky Binns also revealed that she and Alan Halsall, who plays Tyrone, work so well together and hope that they had many more scenes to come and she also stated that in real life, fans approach her in the street to ask where Tyrone is.

Tyrone's best friend and colleague, Kevin Webster (Michael Le Vell), begins a sexual affair with Molly in 2009, but on Christmas Day that year, he ends the affair after discovering his wife, Sally (Sally Dynevor), has breast cancer.

== Storylines ==
Molly is introduced as the daughter of local baker, Diggory Compton (Eric Potts). When she first arrives, it becomes clear that she was a victim of bullying at school, particularly by Fiz Brown (Jennie McAlpine). Molly starts to work for Fiz's boyfriend Kirk Sutherland (Andrew Whyment), whom she flirts with to get revenge on Fiz and wind her up.

After briefly working in her father's shop and at Kirk's kennels, Molly then starts working for Dev Alahan (Jimmi Harkishin) at his corner shop. Molly begins dating Tyrone Dobbs (Alan Halsall) and lives with him and his surrogate parents Jack (Bill Tarmey) and Vera Duckworth (Liz Dawn). Molly forms a close bond and friendship with Vera and asks her for advice about her relationship with Tyrone. Molly is devastated when Vera dies in January 2008.

After Vera's death, Molly and Tyrone buy the Duckworths' house and live there with Jack, and also keep Jack and Vera's grandson Paul Clayton (Tom Hudson) in as lodger until he leaves in May 2008.

In May 2008, Molly makes her mark on the Duckworths' house by removing the stone cladding that Vera had put on the front of the house in 1989. Jack agrees with this move but Tyrone is not happy as he sees the cladding as a memory of Vera. Eventually as the builders proceed to remove the cladding they inform Molly that the job would be much more expensive as the cladding is ruining the brick work as it is removed. The cheapest option was for the cladding to remain on the house and Molly agrees, much to Tyrone's delight.

In July 2008, Tyrone is advised by Jack to propose marriage to Molly at an upmarket restaurant. Tyrone chooses not to propose at that moment. Molly later plans a surprise proposal to Tyrone and the two get engaged, with the help of Molly's aunt Pam Hobsworth (Kate Anthony), who arrives in Weatherfield around the same time.

In August 2008, Tyrone decides that Molly should meet his mother Jackie (Margi Clarke). Everything goes to plan, until Molly and Tyrone discover that Jackie is £1,000 in debt to an old friend of Tyrone's father and needs the money to pay this off, much to Molly's despair. The couple use their wedding savings to pay the man off. This puts their plans on hold for Molly to afford her dream wedding dress.

Molly and Tyrone marry (2009)

In December 2008, Molly becomes suspicious of Tyrone's behaviour. He has secretly been selling illegal merchandise with Pam, to help pay for their wedding. Molly mistakenly thinks that Tyrone is having an affair with Minnie Chandra (Poppy Jhakra), after she spots the pair flirting, when in reality Minnie was buying perfume and T-shirts from Tyrone. When Tyrone confesses that he has been selling illegal stock with Pam, Molly is furious and leaves him, saying that she can no longer trust him. She later forgives him, and the couple get married on 12 January 2009.

In mid 2009, Molly strikes up a friendship with Tyrone's workmate, Kevin Webster (Michael Le Vell). The pair, along with Jason Grimshaw (Ryan Thomas), train together for the local fun run. Although Kevin jealously accuses Jason of sleeping with Molly, Molly laughs it off and they remain friends. Kevin is the only person to support Molly at the local fun run and, the same night, Kevin looks longingly at photos of Molly at the fun run on his mobile phone. In June 2009, Molly confronts Kevin to why he is acting so strangely around her; Kevin reluctantly admits that he is in love with her. Molly slaps him and leaves, but outside the garage she smiles to herself.

They later begin an affair which is nearly exposed at Kevin's wife, Sally Webster's (Sally Dynevor) 42nd birthday party in July 2009. Molly smooths things over between the couple, ends her affair with Kevin and goes on holiday with Tyrone. When she returns in August 2009 she does the fun run again with Kevin and they celebrate by having sex at a nearby hotel. Some weeks later Pam spots Molly kissing Kevin. When Pam confronts Molly about her affair, Molly declares that she is in love with Kevin. Pam disapproves and gives her an ultimatum: Confess to Tyrone or end her relationship with Kevin. As a result, Molly pretends to end her affair with Kevin. In a conversation with Tyrone about Kevin and Sally's marriage, she discovers that she is not the only liaison of Kevin's as Tyrone mentions that he has had previous affairs in the past, which she feels insulted by.

Molly and Kevin soon confess their love for each other, and pledge to leave their respective spouses and start a new life together. Sally had a secret of her own - she had breast cancer. On Christmas Day, just as Kevin is about to tell Sally that he is leaving her, she breaks the news of her illness. Kevin then hurries over to the Dobbs' house, on the pretense of needing stuffing for the turkey, after seeing Molly sitting Tyrone down. When Tyrone leaves the house to go to the Rovers, Kevin tells Molly about Sally's breast cancer. Selfishly, Molly tearfully says how unfair it was, not for Sally, but for them. Kevin gets angry and tells her that their relationship is over, as she was the least of his worries, and that he would support Sally through her illness. Molly reveals her heartbreak and ends her Christmas crying. On New Eve's Eve, she dolls herself up to make Kevin jealous. Her appearance catches a lot of attention and Kevin is disgusted when Molly accuses him of lying about Sally's cancer. Molly is later seething when she sees Kevin and Sally welcome in the New Year.

In January 2010, Molly promises to be a better wife to Tyrone on their first wedding anniversary. On the second anniversary of Vera's death, Molly tells Tyrone that she is leaving him because she no longer loves him, and he begs her to stay. She denies that she has been seeing someone else and moves into the flat above Dev's shop. In March 2010, Molly is shocked to discover that she is four months pregnant, with the possibilities that the father is Kevin or Tyrone. When she informs Kevin of her pregnancy, he refuses to have anything to do with her and he coldly burns the baby scan picture in front of her. With nowhere left to turn, she tells Tyrone about the pregnancy and they reconcile and agree to give their marriage another chance. In April, Molly and Tyrone find out Molly is expecting a baby boy. Kevin is furious and demands Molly has an abortion and to pass it off as a miscarriage.

In April 2010, Tyrone asks Kevin to check up on his car. Whilst fixing it, Kevin is distracted by his daughter Sophie (Brooke Vincent) who is upset. Thinking that the car is ready, Tyrone takes it and drives through the countryside with Molly to tell her father Diggory the news about her pregnancy. Kevin realises that the car is missing before he has finished his work on the brakes and frantically calls Molly and Tyrone. Molly tells Tyrone not to answer as she wants to have a peaceful trip. Tyrone loses control of the car when the brakes fail and it leaves the road and somersaults into a field. Molly and Tyrone are both left unconscious. As Tyrone regains consciousness he finds Molly, still unconscious, next to him. Tyrone flags down a passing motorist who calls 999 and Kevin arrives after following an ambulance to the scene. Kevin and Tyrone both watch as Molly is cut from the wreckage. She is rushed to hospital where she has a scan whilst she is still unconscious and the doctors discover there is still a heartbeat from the baby. Tyrone is told, as long as Molly's life is in the balance, so is the baby's. Tyrone is horrified of the condition of his wife and the unborn child and turns to Kevin for support. When she regains consciousness Molly asks Pam, who is visiting her, what happened and she reveals that Kevin did not fix the brakes. Kevin feels guilty and arrives at the hospital. Molly accuses him of trying to kill her and the baby. Kevin apologises but a furious Molly tells him to save his story for the police. Kevin panics but with Tyrone by Molly's side she changes her mind about her decision. Kevin returns to the hospital to thank Molly but says she did it for Tyrone, not him. Molly tries to persuade Tyrone to move away from Weatherfield for a fresh start as she does not think it is fair for him or the baby to be around Kevin.

In July 2010, Molly is thrilled when her neighbour Eileen Grimshaw (Sue Cleaver) expresses an interest in buying their house, much to Tyrone's despair. Whilst Eileen and Owen Armstrong (Ian Puleston-Davies) are examining the house, Molly has a health scare and nearly collapses. At the hospital the doctors tell her that her collapse was caused by stress. Molly changes her mind about moving and remains in Weatherfield.

On 6 September 2010, Molly gives birth to her son, Jack. She suddenly goes into labour in her home and it is left to Sally to deliver the baby as Tyrone is out on a breakdown call-out. After Kevin agrees to godparenting Jack with Sally, Molly is furious and tells Kevin that she wants him to play no part in Jack's life. Kevin then asks Molly for a DNA test to prove he is the father, but she refuses, believing Tyrone is Jack's father. Kevin steals Jack's dummy in the Rovers following his christening and sends it away for testing. On 5 November 2010, Kevin receives the DNA test results, proving that he is the father. He shows the results to Molly and she is distraught and furious with Kevin for going behind her back.

Not long afterward at Jack's wake, Molly tells Kevin that she is still in love with him. Kevin tells her that he loves Sally and wants to be with her. Realising that Kevin no longer has feelings for her, Molly is heartbroken.

On 6 December 2010, Molly leaves Tyrone, telling him that he is not Jack's father, but she does not tell him who the father is despite his demands to know. She sets out to leave with Jack, intending to go and stay at her father's. She goes to the corner shop to say goodbye to her former employer, Sunita Alahan (Shobna Gulati). Kevin comes into the shop to buy some milk and says goodbye to Molly and Jack after she tells him that he will never see his son again. Shortly after Kevin leaves the shop, there is an explosion in 'The Joinery' bar which throws Molly and Jack to the floor. A tram derails and crashes into the shop, burying Molly and Jack in rubble. She tries to comfort him and loses consciousness. She comes round when firefighters arrive, and Jack is removed from the wreckage and taken to hospital. Molly is trapped under a beam and has to be released by heavy lifting gear and cutting equipment. Sally enters the wreckage and sits by Molly's side to comfort her and keep her conscious. Molly's condition deteriorates and, when she realises that she is dying, she confesses her affair with Kevin and apologises to Sally, saying that Kevin chose Sally because she was beautiful inside and out and that he loved Sally and their daughters more than herself and Jack. Explaining that Kevin is Jack's father, Molly asks Sally to look after him and says that Jack is the only thing from the affair she does not regret. After Molly admits this, Sally lets go of her hand. As Molly pleads for Sally to stay, her hand goes limp and she dies, shocking and devastating Sally. Shortly afterward, Tyrone returns from the hospital and is devastated when Sally emerges from the rubble and informs him of Molly's death.

== Reception ==
Ian Wylie of The Manchester Evening News praised the character and actress for scenes which aired during the highly publicised death of long-term character Vera Duckworth, stating: "readers will know how impressed I was by the acting of Vicky Binns in scenes immediately following the death of Vera Duckworth".

The affair between Molly and Kevin received some negative attention, and criticism for changes in Molly's character, described by the author and TV critic Grace Dent as transforming her into a "sex fuelled dick-daft strumpet." Vicky Binns was surprised by positive reaction: "I love playing a minx. Women give me a nudge and a wink when I'm in the supermarket and say, 'You go girl!'" Ruth Deller of entertainment website Lowculture criticised her affair storyline stating: "Like the rest of the world, we’ve hated the Kevin/Molly storyline. We hate it even more for it turning Molly, previously somewhat likeable, into an out-and-out bitch. Let's just hope it's one of those storylines that will be swept under the carpet soon and never mentioned again..." In 2010, Dan Martin from The Guardian put Molly on his "fantasy hit-list" of characters to be killed-off in 50th anniversary special as he believed that Molly had "lost her personality", and that he believed that it would create "better drama" if the soap's scriptwriters used the accident to kill-off "major characters we're supposed to care about".
