= Coronation Street Live (2010 episode) =

Episode 7487
- Coronation Street episode
- Episode no.: Episode 7487
- Directed by: Tony Prescott
- Written by: Jan McVerry
- Original air date: 9 December 2010
- Running time: 60 minutes (including adverts)

Episode chronology
← Previous; Episode 7486	Next → Episode 7488

Coronation Street Live is a live episode of the British soap opera Coronation Street, which was first broadcast on Thursday 9 December 2010 on ITV. The special live edition was to celebrate fifty years of the programme being on air. The sixty-minute episode was directed by Tony Prescott, who had directed the soap's 40th anniversary live episode in December 2000. The episode, the 7487th in the series, was written by Jan McVerry and produced by Phil Collinson for ITV Studios. It was filmed at the Granada Studios complex in Manchester.

To celebrate the show's 50th anniversary, episodes were broadcast every day during the week 6–10 December 2010 under the advertisement banner "Four Funerals and a Wedding". An episode broadcast the preceding Monday showed a gas explosion in local bar The Joinery, causing a tram to crash from the viaduct into the Corner Shop and The Kabin opposite. The live episode continued to depict the aftermath of the accident, such as the rescue attempts and deaths of the characters Ashley Peacock (Steven Arnold) and Molly Dobbs (Vicky Binns), an emergency marriage between Peter Barlow (Chris Gascoyne) and Leanne Battersby (Jane Danson) on Peter's hospital bed, Fiz Stape (Jennie McAlpine) giving birth prematurely to her daughter Hope, and Molly's revelation to Sally Webster (Sally Dynevor) that her husband Kevin (Michael Le Vell) fathered Molly's recently born baby Jack.

The episode attracted an average of 14 million viewers, peaking at 14.9 million, the show's highest audience for seven years. Critical reception was mainly positive. According to Daniel Kilkelly of the Digital Spy website, the opening of the episode featured the first computer-generated imagery in live television. Jennie McAlpine (who plays Fiz Stape) also became the first actress ever to act out a birth live on a soap opera.

== Plot summary ==
The special anniversary was marked with a storyline in which the residents had to deal with a tragic accident and its aftermath. In the storyline, Nick Tilsley (Ben Price) and Leanne Battersby's (Jane Danson) bar – The Joinery – explodes during Peter Barlow's (Chris Gascoyne) stag party. As a result, the viaduct running above the restaurant is destroyed, sending a tram careering onto the street, destroying D&S Alahan's Corner Shop and The Kabin. Two characters, Ashley Peacock (Steven Arnold) and Molly Dobbs (Vicky Binns), and an unnamed taxi driver perished as a result of the disaster. Rita Sullivan (Barbara Knox) survives despite being trapped under the rubble of her destroyed shop. At the same time Fiz Stape (Jennie McAlpine) prematurely gives birth to a baby girl, Hope, after her husband John (Graeme Hawley) strikes his stalker Charlotte Hoyle (Becky Hindley) with a hammer to silence her. He later poses as Colin Fishwick (David Crellin), Charlotte's supposed partner, attempting to turn off her life support. Peter marries Leanne in an emergency hospital ceremony shortly before going into cardiac arrest, although he later rallies and makes a slow recovery.

== Production ==
=== Origins ===
Early episodes of Coronation Street were broadcast live. A live episode was produced in December 2000 to celebrate the programme's 40th anniversary. As the show's 50th anniversary approached, speculation began to grow as to whether another live edition would be broadcast, particularly after rival soap EastEnders aired its own live edition to celebrate its 25th anniversary on air in February 2010. In April 2010, William Roache, who has portrayed Ken Barlow since the show's first episode, said that ITV would not be airing another live edition of Coronation Street, saying, "We're not going to do a live episode, we did that in the Millennium year [the show's 40th anniversary], we don't want to do that again." Reflecting upon the 2000 episode in November 2010, Roache said that he was glad when it was over and that "they won't do that again". He joked, "anyone who said that they enjoyed the live episode are either not telling the truth or they're masochists." However, on 29 August, actor Keith Duffy said that Coronation Street would air a live episode to celebrate its 50th anniversary, something which was confirmed on 1 September by ITV. It was later confirmed that the episode would be aired as part of a week-long celebration of the soap's 50th birthday. Phil Collinson, who had only recently taken over as producer, explained:

I thought we wouldn't go live, but quickly realised we should. I think we can deliver the most spectacular piece of live television people have ever seen. Coronation Street has such a heritage – the first episodes were filmed that way, and we did it ten years ago. My ambition is for the episode to be like a disaster movie with stunts. It'll be action-packed. I want people to sit at home and think, 'There's no way they did that live, not in a million years!'

The anniversary was celebrated with a storyline involving an explosion in The Joinery, causing a tram to crash from the viaduct into the Kabin and Corner Shop. According to producer Phil Collinson, the storyline was a sign that TV shows now have to strive harder to make an impact. "Television has changed. Programmes like Coronation Street have to stand up against massive pieces of event television like Strictly Come Dancing and The X Factor. So we had to do something extraordinary. When drama pushes the boat out, it has to push it out really far. I think the days are over when television drama can sit back and leave it to your imagination. We have to compete against those great big juggernauts." The tram crashed during an episode broadcast on Monday 6 December, with episodes later that week, including the live episode, depicting the rescues and aftermath.

=== Filming ===
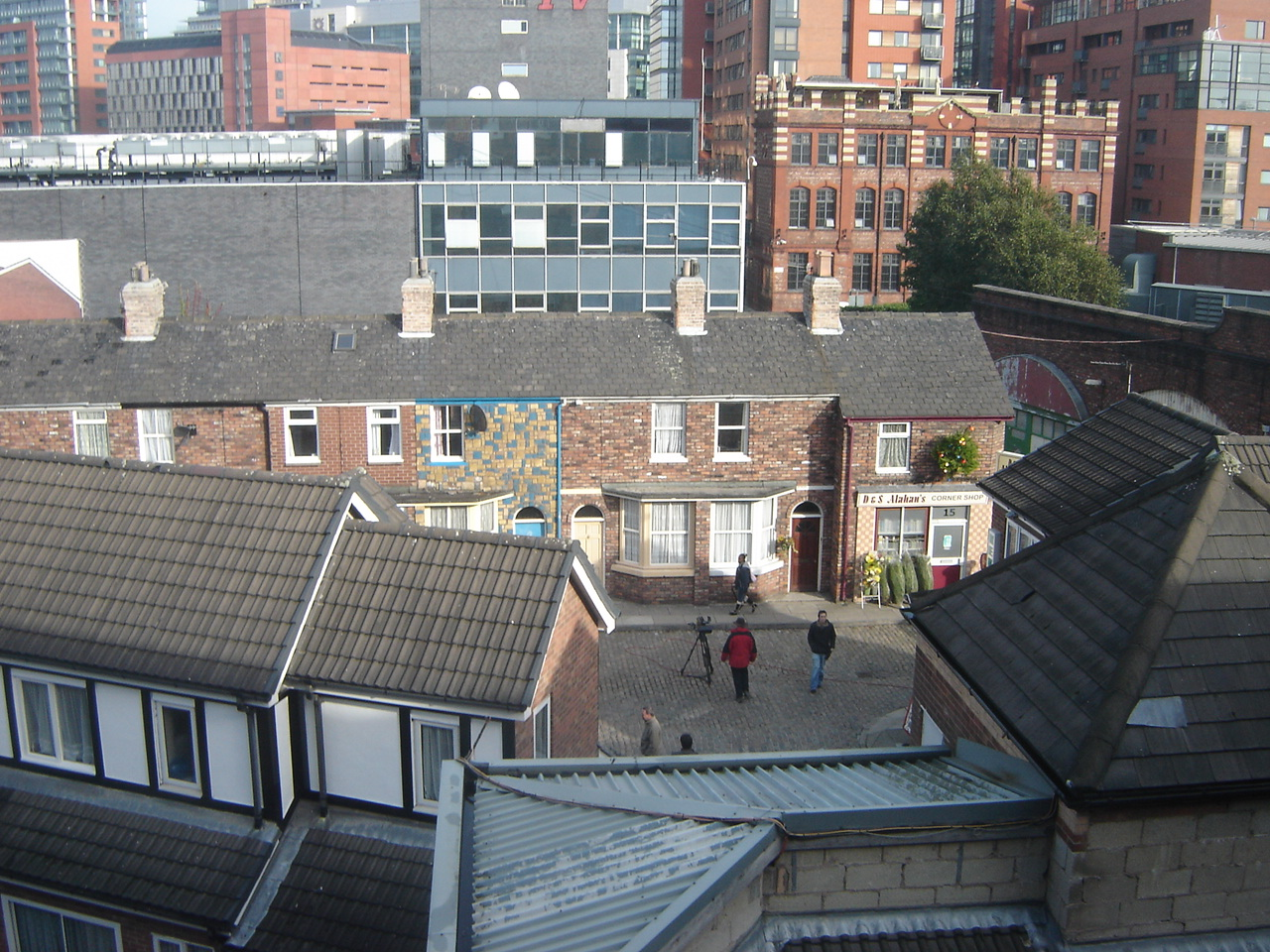
The Coronation Street exterior set surrounded by the Granada Studios complex and Manchester city centre (photographed in Oct 2007).

The live show involved 65 actors and a 300-strong crew. The episode opened with a wide shot of other streets in the fictional Weatherfield, reported by Digital Spy's Daniel Kilkelly to have been the first computer-generated imagery to be produced live. In reality, the Coronation Street set is surrounded by the Granada Television complex in Manchester city centre. The special effect was produced by The Mill, the post-production company that had worked on the tram crash. Collinson had worked with The Mill during his tenure as producer of Doctor Who.

The episode was directed by Tony Prescott, who had directed the 40th anniversary live episode in December 2000. Prescott also directed the two episodes surrounding this live episode to gain continuity.

The live episode provided some challenges for dressing the set. The other episodes during the 50th anniversary week, including the tram crash, were filmed in October. As episodes are usually filmed weeks in advance, the tram had to be removed from sight for the filming of the Christmas and New Year episodes and then put back in place over the weekend 4–5 December, in time for rehearsals and transmission. Also, the cast and crew had to deal with extreme cold on the outdoor set during the days of rehearsals and broadcast as the UK was plunged into record levels of cold weather for the time of year.

The producers reportedly banned the actors from drinking alcohol for 24 hours before the transmission to reduce the chances of accidents. Producers also banned the sweepstake that some cast members were running to bet on who would "fluff" their lines first.

== The Sun false story ==
On the day of transmission, tabloid newspaper The Sun claimed that police were "throwing a ring of steel" around the filming. Greater Manchester Police issued a statement saying that they "have categorically not been made aware of any threat from Al-Qaeda or any other proscribed organisation." The statement said that Granada had approached the police to assist a private security firm to help ensure that the "live programme went ahead without outside interference", but "to reiterate there is no specific intelligence threat to Coronation Street or any such event" The Sun published a correction on 28 December. The Guardian pointed out that the apology had been negotiated by the Press Complaints Commission.

== Characters and cast ==
- Sally Dynevor as Sally Webster
- Sue Nicholls as Audrey Roberts
- Malcolm Hebden as Norris Cole
- Brooke Vincent as Sophie Webster
- Helen Flanagan as Rosie Webster
- Andy Whyment as Kirk Sutherland
- Alison King as Carla Connor
- Samia Smith as Maria Connor
- Jack P. Shepherd as David Platt
- Craig Gazey as Graeme Proctor
- Sacha Parkinson as Sian Powers
- Vicky Binns as Molly Dobbs
- Tony Hirst as Paul Kershaw (credited as “Fire Officer Paul”)
- Graeme Hawley as John Stape
- Jennie McAlpine as Fiz Stape
- Barbara Knox as Rita Sullivan
- Antony Cotton as Sean Tully
- Katy Cavanagh as Julie Carp
- Ben Price as Nick Tilsley
- Vicky Entwistle as Janice Battersby
- Jane Danson as Leanne Barlow
- Chris Gascoyne as Peter Barlow
- Julia Haworth as Claire Peacock
- Simon Gregson as Steve McDonald
- Katherine Kelly as Becky McDonald
- Paula Lane as Kylie Turner
- Michael Le Vell as Kevin Webster
- Alan Halsall as Tyrone Dobbs
- Julie Hesmondhalgh as Hayley Cropper
- David Neilson as Roy Cropper
- Sue Cleaver as Eileen Grimshaw
- Ryan Thomas as Jason Grimshaw
- Oliver Mellor as Matt Carter (credited as “Dr Carter”)
- Patti Clare as Mary Taylor
- Keith Duffy as Ciaran McCarthy
- Craig Charles as Lloyd Mullaney
- Michelle Keegan as Tina McIntyre
- Steve Huison as Eddie Windass
- Debbie Rush as Anna Windass
- Holly Quin-Ankrah as Cheryl Gray
- Ian Puleston-Davies as Owen Armstrong
- Georgia May Foote as Katy Armstrong
- Sam Aston as Chesney Brown
- Mikey North as Gary Windass
- Jimmi Harkishin as Dev Alahan
- Shobna Gulati as Sunita Alahan
- William Roache as Ken Barlow
- Cherylee Houston as Izzy Armstrong
- Will Thorp as Chris Gray
- Steven Arnold as Ashley Peacock (Note: Arnold makes an uncredited voiceover as Ashley.)

== Reception ==
The hour-long episode averaged 14.03 million viewers (52.1%), peaking at 14.9 million. It was the series' most-watched episode in seven years, and drew an additional 2.04 million viewers (14.1%) when repeated at 10.35 pm. Viewing figures did not surpass those of "EastEnders Live", a live episode of the BBC soap opera EastEnders watched by 16.6 million viewers in February 2010. Following the live broadcast, the second part of a two-part documentary, Coronation Street: 50 Years, 50 Moments, averaged 6.81 million viewers (27.2%).

Live episodes are prone to mishaps and actors fluffing their lines. This episode was commended for how smoothly it seemed to have gone. Critic Mark Lawson commented that "the producers were clever in setting every scene among characters under stress or grief, so any flapping might have been taken as acting." The only mistake the press pointed out was the character Sally Webster being allowed into the wreckage of Dev's shop without a safety helmet.

EastEnders, Coronation Street's biggest rival, supported the anniversary by having its character Dot Branning (June Brown) reveal that she is a "massive Corrie fan", although another character, Kat Moon (Jessie Wallace) complained that she'd "rather watch a lot of dirty laundry going round".

The Live episode along with all the 50th Anniversary episodes and also included special features. which included: • The Making of Anniversary week,• The Filming of the tram crash,• The filming of the Live episode,• Tram Crash News Flash (dramatised ITV News),• Farewell Ashley,• Richard Arnold Blog ' What's Next for the Websters',• Ken Barlow – A Life on the Street,• 50 Years of Corrie Stunts hosted by Craig Charles. were released on DVD by ITV Home Entertainment as a two-disc set on 21 February 2011.

The 50th Live episode was repeated on 11 December 2020 on ITV3; this will also be the first classic episode to be produced and re-transmitted in 1080i High Definition, as part of the 60th Anniversary celebrations of Coronation Street.
