= Tyrone Dobbs =

Fictional character from Coronation Street

- Coronation Street character
- Portrayed by: Alan Halsall
- Duration: 1998–present
- First appearance: 30 November 1998
- Introduced by: Brian Park
- Book appearances: Coronation Street: The Complete Saga
- Spin-off appearances: Text Santa (2013, 2015)
In-universe information
- Occupation: Mechanic; Businessman
- Father: Ross Wilkes
- Mother: Cassie Plummer
- Adoptive father: Darren Dobbs
- Adoptive mother: Jackie Dobbs
- Wife: Molly Compton (2009–2010); Fiz Stape (2022–present)
- Sons: Dorin Pop
- Daughters: Ruby Dobbs
- Adoptive daughters: Hope Dobbs
- Stepsons: Jack Webster
- Grandfathers: Harold Plummer
- Grandmothers: Evelyn Plummer

Tyrone Dobbs is a fictional character from the British ITV soap opera Coronation Street. Portrayed by Alan Halsall, the character first appeared on screen during the episode airing on 30 November 1998 and is still a cast member over 25 years later. Tyrone's storylines have been focused on his relationships with Maria Connor (Samia Ghadie) and Fiz Brown (Jennie McAlpine) as well as his doomed marriage to Molly Dobbs (Vicky Binns) and suffering domestic violence at the hands of his fiancée Kirsty Soames (Natalie Gumede). In 2018, following the death of his mother Jackie (Margi Clarke), Tyrone discovers that Jackie was not his biological mother and while searching for his birth parents, meets his maternal grandmother, Evelyn Plummer (Maureen Lipman).

== Casting ==
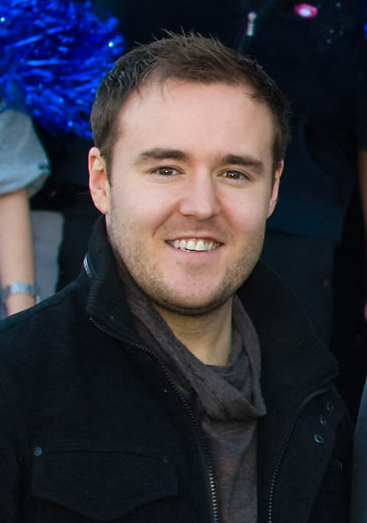
Alan Halsall (pictured) plays Tyrone

During an interview with Alan Halsall, the actor revealed that he likes characters that develop in different ways. Halsall stated he enjoys the experience of the character's various relationships, especially as it differs with each one, notably his character's partnership with Molly Dobbs' auntie Pam Hobsworth. The actor confirmed that he was pleased to see Tyrone involved in more storylines, feeling that his character was underused for a long period of time. He also claimed interest in the aspect of a wedding. Alan Halsall contradicted statements that Tyrone and Molly were the new Jack and Vera Duckworth, claiming it impossible for him to fill. The actor revealed that he would be pleased to see Margi Clarke as Tyrone's on-screen mother full-time on the show.

== Development ==
In June 2011, it was announced that a new "love interest" for Tyrone would be introduced; Natalie Gumede was cast as Kirsty Soames, making her first appearance later that year. Executive producer Phil Collinson said: "A big storyline across the summer and into the autumn is Tyrone meeting somebody who's hopefully going to help him move on from Molly and everything that happened. A brand new character is going to come in - she's called Kirsty. I have to say, it's not all going to be a smooth ride for Tyrone - he's got a lot of baggage and he's got a lot that he's got to get over. It's a big story for him over the summer."

In March 2012, it was announced that an upcoming storyline would see Tyrone become a victim of domestic abuse from Kirsty. A Coronation Street source said: "Kirsty will be seen attacking Tyrone and the fallout will be how she feels terrible about it and attempts to show some remorse.". ManKind, the UK's leading charity for supporting male victims of abuse, praised the storyline for tackling the issue.

On 10 November 2023, Coronation Street confirmed Halsal will take a short break from the show due to Halsal needing an operation to repair a ligament in his knee.

== Storylines ==
Upon his arrival, it becomes clear that Tyrone has been in minor trouble with the law. He is employed by Curly Watts (Kevin Kennedy) collecting trolleys at a supermarket but loses his job when he accidentally pushes a trolley into the area manager's new car. Following this, Tyrone trains as an apprentice mechanic at the local garage, Webster's Auto Centre, owned by Kevin Webster (Michael Le Vell).

After his mother abandons him, Tyrone moves into Jack (Bill Tarmey) and Vera Duckworth's (Liz Dawn) bed and breakfast establishment and adopts a greyhound, Monica. While seeking a partner for Monica, Tyrone meets and begins dating Maria Sutherland (Samia Smith), a kennel maid and they get engaged in 2002. Fiz Brown (Jennie McAlpine), however, tries to come between them. She succeeds and has a brief relationship with Tyrone but he ends it and realises he is better suited to Molly Compton (Vicky Binns). They live with Jack and Vera at number 9 and plan to buy somewhere of their own but they buy Jack and Vera out when they decide to move to Blackpool. Vera, however, dies in January 2008. Jack stays with Tyrone and Molly at Number 9 and the family atmosphere is soon enhanced with the arrival of Molly's aunt, Pam Hobsworth (Kate Anthony).

Jack, attempting to encourage Tyrone to propose to Molly, gives him Vera's engagement ring. Tyrone books a table at a fancy restaurant, but is upstaged by a much flashier proposal before he can. Several days later, Pam suggests that Tyrone put a ring in a decorative egg with a voice recorder. When Tyrone opens the egg at The Rovers, Kirk Sutherland (Andrew Whyment) is heard instead, asking how it works. Tyrone runs out, embarrassed. Jack and Kirk follow and Jack tells him that the moments that do not go as planned are often happier than the moments that do. Tyrone tries again and returns to find a burger van decorated in Christmas lights, with a table in front. When Tyrone opens the egg to propose, Molly opens an egg herself, with a recording of her saying, "Of course, you great nana." The following month, Tyrone and Molly visit his mother and discover that she is £1,000 in debt and owes his father's friend money. Tyrone and Molly decide to help, despite their plans to use it for Molly's wedding dress. On discovering that Jackie has scammed them, Tyrone tells Jackie that she is not welcome at the wedding.

Jack introduces Tyrone to his new friend, Connie. Tyrone, angry that Jack would consider replacing Vera, is hostile and decides that she is a gold-digger who only wants Jack's money. Connie proves him wrong on this by inviting them to her house, proving by the size and facilities that Connie needs companionship, not more money. Needing space from Tyrone, Kevin and Molly start to go running together and decide to train for a fun run. Kevin develops feelings for Molly and feeling flattered, they begin an affair. At one point, Tyrone gets worried about how Molly has changed but Kevin insists that she would never cheat on him. Trying to cover her tracks, Molly accuses Tyrone of cheating on her with Minnie Chandra (Poppy Jhakra). In January 2010, after just a year of marriage, Molly leaves Tyrone and moves into the flat over the corner shop, leaving him confused and inconsolable. Thinking Molly is having an affair with Dev Alahan (Jimmi Harkishin), he attacks him. However, in March, Molly faints at work and learns that she is four months pregnant. Convinced that Molly has not slept with Dev, Tyrone assumes that he is the father and persuades Molly to come home. Feeling lonely and rejected by Kevin, Molly agrees and in April, they learn that they are expecting a boy. Kevin and Sally support Molly when she gives birth to her baby in September and names him Jack. Tyrone, Molly, and Jack settle into family life, unaware that Tyrone may not be Jack's father. Tyrone's joy at his new life is dashed when a month later, Jack (Duckworth) reveals that he has an incurable form of non-Hodgkin lymphoma, and has only weeks to live. Tyrone is devastated and gives a moving eulogy at Jack's funeral and later scatters his ashes.

On 6 December 2010, Molly admits to Tyrone that she had an affair and he is not Jack's father. Tyrone is shocked and turns to Sally Webster (Sally Dynevor) for help. He is concerned when Molly and Jack are trapped in the Corner Shop after a tram crashes into it. Jack is rescued first and Tyrone goes with him to the hospital but Kevin stays with him and sends Tyrone to check on Molly and is devastated by news of Molly's death. Back at the hospital with Jack, Tyrone tells Kevin that he will kill whoever destroyed his family. At Molly's funeral, Tyrone breaks down during the eulogy and Sophie prompts Kevin to take over but Sally walks out, angered by his hypocrisy, puzzling Tyrone. After overhearing them argue, he realises that Kevin is Jack's father and attacks him at the graveside, knocking him into Molly's grave. When Tyrone gets home, Sally returns baby Jack, persuading him that he is the only father Jack knows and that he should raise him regardless. Eventually, he agrees and takes Jack but realises that his feelings for Jack have changed. All he sees is a reminder of Molly and Kevin's betrayal and gives him to Kevin. On Christmas Eve, he decides to make a fresh start by "getting drunk and going sober". Kevin tries to persuade him to keep Jack, but Tyrone refuses, insisting he does not want anything to do with him or Jack. Tyrone spends Christmas Day with Maria, Kirk and Liam and sees the New Year in with Sally, both feeling 2011 has to be better than 2010. Despite his hatred of Kevin, Tyrone is unwilling to walk away from the garage and continues to work there.

However, 2011 is worse, not better. In early January, Kevin attacks Tyrone after learning that he and Sally spent two nights together and assumes that something has happened between them. Then, in February, Tyrone dates Julie Carp (Katy Cavanagh) briefly, but they break up as they agree that they are not right together. In March, Tyrone is incensed when Kevin wins £200,000 on a scratchcard, feeling he has no right to it and tells Sally just before she signs the divorce papers. In return, she buys him a drink in gratitude. His year improves when Jack's grandson, Tommy Duckworth (Chris Fountain), comes looking for Jack; Tyrone tells him that Jack died a few months ago and they become friends and Tommy moves in. However, his life goes downhill in mid-May: on the 19th, Kevin orders a new hydraulic car ramp for the garage but would not let Tyrone use it. The next day, when Tyrone sees Kevin sack Tommy and head off on a call-out, he loses it and attacks the ramp with a 32-inch spanner before going to the Rovers. However, the ramp, due to the damage Tyrone has done, collapses on Kev and crushes him. However, Tyrone and Tommy pull him out, just as the ambulance arrives. Tyrone, in shock, gets drunk as he realises that he nearly killed Kevin but Kevin blames Tommy, assuming that it was because Kevin sacked him, so Tyrone confesses. Kevin is angry but understands why Tyrone did it and they call a truce. Tyrone agrees but continues to wind Kevin up at every opportunity.

In September 2011, Tyrone and Tommy go to a bar in town and Tommy pays an attractive girl to flirt with Tyrone to boost his self-esteem. The young woman, Kirsty Soames (Natalie Gumede), enjoys Tyrone's company and they swap numbers. Tyrone is euphoric but Tommy feels guilty, fearing that Kirsty only did it because he paid her. Tommy tells him the truth after she phones and they arrange a date. Kirsty feels that they could build a relationship and soon, they fall in love. However, the first time Kirsty suggests spending the night together, Tyrone panics and Kirsty reassures him that they can wait until he is ready. Tyrone is grateful and buys her a new mobile phone to say thank you. Although he has feelings for Kirsty, he is stunned to learn that she is a policewoman. Tyrone is proud and nervous, worrying about everything that he says to her. However, Kirsty soon shows her dark side when she warns him to stay away from Fiz, as she has just been released from prison. Kirsty insists that her job would be jeopardised by having a criminal as a friend so Tyrone agrees to keep his distance from Fiz but is shocked. However, the situation worsens when she and Tyrone's friend Tina McIntyre (Michelle Keegan) argue repeatedly and Tyrone hears Kirsty threaten her. Forced to choose, Tyrone picks Tina. Later, Kirsty visits Tyrone but Tina insists that he is out so Kirsty waits for him in her police car. Convinced that Tyrone and Tina's relationship is closer than they are admitting, she follows them when Tina takes Tyrone out for a curry. Furious at Kirsty's behaviour, Tina drives to the police station, intending to make a complaint however Kirsty crashes into Tina's car so all three are taken to hospital. They are stunned to learn that Kirsty is pregnant so she and Tyrone reconcile, despite his anger at Kirsty's lies. Tina makes a complaint regardless but Tyrone persuades her to drop it, due to Kirsty's pregnancy, and she reluctantly agrees.

Kirsty later helps Tommy and Tyrone expose a crooked local councillor but loses her job as she is caught breaking the law. Tyrone gets her a job at the factory but Kirsty is not pleased and hits him so Tyrone leaves. He later tells her that his mother used to hit him. Tommy persuades Tyrone to lend him £9,000 to get his father, Terry, out of a loan shark's clutches but Terry leaves with the money, claiming that it is rightfully his as Tyrone inherited it from Jack. He leaves Tommy to deal with the loan shark, who insists Tommy use the garage to put drugs into cars, to repay Terry's debt. Tommy also agrees on a repayment plan with Tyrone.

Tyrone and Kirsty's relationship is rocky due to her inability to control her temper and fists. She hits Tyrone repeatedly and blames her pregnancy hormones when Tyrone demands an explanation. He insists she see the doctor to get counselling for her problems but she walks out of the surgery at the last minute, scared that the doctor will tell her that she's a risk to the baby. This prompts Deirdre to check on her and finds Kirsty with a cut forehead after a row with Tyrone when she slipped in the yard after Tyrone pushed her away. Deirdre misunderstands and thinks that Tyrone is hitting Kirsty so she leaves him. Tommy, however, seeing how upset Tyrone is, tracks Kirsty down and asks her to return. She does, just as Tyrone is chatting to another woman, and assumes he has moved on but he insists it was strictly platonic and she believes him. When Tina learns what Tommy has done, she is horrified and tells him that Kirsty was abusing Tyrone. Disgusted, he soon intervenes when Kirsty accuses Tina of having designs on Tyrone and tells her, Tina and Tyrone that he knows what she's been doing, infuriating Tyrone as he had told Tina in confidence. Kirsty, angry and upset, threatens to leave again unless Tyrone chooses her over his friends, which he does and she stays. When Tina and Tommy tried to talk to him again, Tyrone fires Tommy from the garage, telling him he only wants to see him when he's giving him the cash he owes. Tommy tells everyone in the pub about it but this backfires when Tyrone tells people about him selling drugs in the garage. They soon reconcile after Tommy breaks his ankle in a road accident, insisting that there is no rush to repay the money he owes. However, the peace is short-lived when he finds out that Tina had pushed Kirsty, sending her into labour. They have a daughter and name her Ruby. Tommy and Tina tried to make amends but to no avail.

Unfortunately, Kirsty's violent outbursts continue after Ruby is born, making it clear to Tyrone that pregnancy hormones were not the problem, after all. When he sees Kirsty has smashed up the kitchen and knocked Ruby's pram over, he panics that she has attacked Ruby and rushes her to the doctor. Luckily, Ruby is fine but Fiz finds Tyrone and convinces him to have a cup of tea with her. He tells Fiz about the abuse and she convinces him to talk to her counsellor but soon learns that Kirsty has not seen her counselor for some time. He confronts Kirsty and tells her that he has given up on her. Later, he sees Alison, Kirsty's mother, at the bus stop. She tells him that she has left her husband, Ed, and Tyrone asks her to stay with them, seeing it as a solution to their problem. Kirsty was against it, knowing that her father would come looking for Alison and he did. Ed soon arrived and snatches Ruby, refusing to give her back until Alison goes home with him, which she does. Following another violent outburst, Tyrone tells Kirsty to leave and he is keeping Ruby but she tells him that if she goes, Ruby goes with her as Tyrone has no right to keep her. He is devastated to learn that she registered Ruby's birth alone, leaving his name off the birth certificate, so he has no parental rights. Having no other choice, Tyrone allows Kirsty to stay and they agree that she will go back to work and he will be a stay-at-home father.

Worried about Tyrone being isolated, Fiz persuades Katy to take Tyrone and Ruby to a playgroup where he befriends a woman named Angela. When Kirsty finds a text from Angela, inviting him to her daughter's birthday party, she is jealous and asks Tyrone not to go. Fiz finds out and confronts Kirsty, who tampers with Fiz's sewing machine, causing a nasty injury to Fiz's fingers, to teach her a lesson. Kirsty tells Fiz that she tampered with the machine, but when Fiz tells people, no one believes her so Fiz reports Kirsty to the police and they question her at work. Furious, Kirsty attacks her again, unaware that Tyrone is in Fiz's kitchen. Feeling she cannot trust Tyrone because Fiz has been texting him, she takes his keys and phone with her to work the next day. When Tyrone complains, Kirsty attacks him again but this time shows no remorse and demands Tyrone apologise, which he eventually does. Distraught, Tyrone plans to snatch Ruby and run but Fiz and Tommy persuade him that he should marry Kirsty so he will have parental rights. Needing comfort, Fiz and Tyrone begin an affair, despite his plans to marry Kirsty. Tina is horrified when she finds out and tells Tyrone to take Kirsty to court, rather than marry her, but he insists he knows what he is doing and goes ahead regardless. Unfortunately, this plan costs Fiz her job at Underworld but Tyrone makes amends by getting her a job at the café so things settle down again but Kirsty demands Tyrone have no further contact with Fiz. This sparks another beating when she finds Fiz has given him a birthday card and, feeling guilty, Kirsty wants to call off the wedding, but Tyrone refuses.

On the day of Kirsty and Tyrone's stag-do/hen party, Kirsty finds Tyrone's secret phone with messages that detail Tyrone's plan for parental responsibility. In revenge, she invites Fiz to the wedding and promptly reveals their affair to the congregation before refusing to marry Tyrone. She takes Ruby and leaves, eventually going home to confront Tyrone. He admits everything and tells her why before asking her to let him take Ruby and move out but she refuses. She goes to hit Tyrone again but overbalances at the top of the stairs and when found by the neighbours, she accuses Tyrone of domestic abuse. He is arrested and Ruby goes into temporary care while Kirsty is in hospital. Fiz and Tina stand by Tyrone and convince him to fight for Ruby when he is released on bail, but Kirsty threatens to refuse him all access if he does not return to her. In desperation, he kidnaps Ruby with Fiz and Hope and they go to Wales, planning to sail to Ireland but Fiz calls the police. Tyrone is arrested for child abduction and charged with the assault on Kirsty. On 29 March 2013, during Tyrone's trial, Kirsty walks into court with Ruby and admits that she is the abuser, not Tyrone. After this revelation, Tyrone is freed and Kirsty is sent to prison. Kirsty nominates Tyrone to look after Ruby in her absence and Social Services arrange for him to have formal custody. She phones and asks him to visit her in prison, which he does, and he tells her not to contact them ever again after wishing her luck in dealing with her problems.

When Tyrone gets out of prison he struggles to forgive people for thinking he was a wife beater. However, Fiz eventually talks him round and he accepts the apologies of his friends. Shortly afterwards, Fiz moves in with Tyrone with her daughter Hope. The couple is devastated when they learn that Hayley Cropper (Julie Hesmondhalgh) is dying from pancreatic cancer, and help her and her husband Roy (David Neilson) through the terrible situation. Fiz and Tyrone are later distraught when Hayley passes away.

In August 2014, Jason Grimshaw (Ryan Thomas) is doing a loft conversion for Tyrone, and Todd Grimshaw (Bruno Langley) is putting more boards in the floor of the loft. Jason and Todd leave for the Rovers and warn Tyrone not to go up there. However, Tyrone goes up to video about what he is going to do in the loft. He stands on the ladder, falls and crashes through the floor. He has a bloody nose and forehead, two broken ribs and a broken wrist. Todd had put up unsteady boards. Gary Windass (Mikey North) finds out what Todd did and tells Tony Stewart (Terence Maynard) who is furious with Todd.

In October 2015, it is revealed Hope is suffering from a type of childhood cancer called neuroblastoma, plunging Fiz and Tyrone into panic. Hope was eventually cured, but Fiz and Tyrone's insistence to provide a perfect Christmas to her in case it turned out to be her last. This later gave them financial issues. In August 2019, Hope is referred to a specialist school due to her disruptive behaviour and is taught at home by care worker Jade Rowan (Lottie Henshall), who moves in with Fiz and Tyrone and is later revealed to be the daughter of John Stape. Jade feels that Fiz caused his downfall and death, and fearing that Hope is also at stake, enlists the help of social services in order to have Hope taken away from Fiz and Tyrone by pretending that Hope has been physically abused at home.

In January 2021, Alina Pop (Ruxandra Porojnicu) moves into Fiz and Tyrone's house after she is forced to leave the salon flat due to Ray Crosby's (Mark Frost) development. When Ray's development is cancelled, Alina moves back into the salon flat and continues to be friends with Tyrone. Eventually, it comes out that Alina fancies Tyrone and kisses him. He gives in and they are both shocked about what happened. Tyrone comes clean to Fiz who is furious. She confronts Alina and tells her to stay away from Tyrone. She forgives him after he agrees to stay away from Alina. Unfortunately, he cannot help himself and continues to see Alina. When Fiz finds out, she kicks him out of the home and he moves into the salon flat with Alina.

== Reception ==
For his portrayal of Tyrone, Halsall was nominated in the category of "Most Popular Newcomer" at the 1999 National Television Awards. On Digital Spy's 2012 end-of-year reader poll, Halsall was nominated for "Best Male Soap Actor" and came second with 18.2% of the vote. Tyrone's domestic abuse storyline with Kirsty won Best Storyline with 28.3% of votes. In 2013, Halsall won the award for "Best Dramatic Male Performance" for his portrayal of Tyrone.
