= Lesley Walker =

British film and television editor (1945–2025)

- Born: 27 July 1945; Wimbledon, London, England
- Died: 2 December 2025 (aged 80)
- Occupations: Film and television editor
- Notable work: Fear and Loathing in Las Vegas; Mamma Mia!

Lesley Walker (27 July 1945 – 2 December 2025) was a British film and television editor with more than 30 feature film credits. She came into prominence in the 1980s, when she "developed a fast and snappy editing style in the decade, with A Letter to Brezhnev (1985), Mona Lisa (1986), Cry Freedom (1987), and Shirley Valentine (1989)." She worked extensively with directors Terry Gilliam and Richard Attenborough.

Walker's work was honoured by nominations for the BAFTA Award for Best Editing (Mona Lisa (1986) and Cry Freedom (1987)), for the Genie Award for Best Achievement in Editing (Tideland (2005)), and the American Cinema Editors Eddie Award (Mamma Mia! (2008)).

Walker died on 2 December 2025, at the age of 80.

== Feature films as editor ==
The director is indicated in parentheses.

- The Night Digger (1971)
- A Portrait of the Artist as a Young Man (Strick-1977)
- The Tempest (Jarman-1979)
- Eagle's Wing (Harvey-1979)
- Richard's Things (Harvey-1980)
- Letter to Brezhnev (Bernard-1985)
- Mona Lisa (Jordan-1986)
- Winter Flight (Battersby-1986)
- Cry Freedom (Attenborough-1987)
- Buster (Green-1988)
- Shirley Valentine (Gilbert-1989)
- Spymaker: The Secret Life of Ian Fleming (1990)
- The Fisher King (Gilliam-1991)
- Waterland (Gyllenhaal-1992)
- Shadowlands (Attenborough-1993)
- Born Yesterday (Mandoki-1993)
- Jack and Sarah (Sullivan-1995)
- Emma (McGrath-1996)
- In Love and War (Attenborough-1996)
- Mary Reilly (Frears-1996)
- Fear and Loathing in Las Vegas (Gilliam-1998)
- Grey Owl (Attenborough-1999)
- The Body (McCord-2001; with Alain Jakubowicz)
- Nicholas Nickleby (McGrath-2002)
- All or Nothing (Leigh-2002)
- The Sleeping Dictionary (Jenkin-2003)
- The Brothers Grimm (Gilliam-2005)
- Tideland (Gilliam-2005)
- Closing the Ring (Attenborough-2007)
- Mamma Mia! (Lloyd-2008)
- Will (Perry-2011)
- I Am Nasrine (Gharavi-2012; supervising editor with Lucia Zucchetti)
- Molly Moon and the Incredible Book of Hypnotism (Rowley-2015)
- The Man Who Killed Don Quixote (Gilliam-2018)
- Military Wives (Cattaneo-2019)

== See also ==
- List of film director and editor collaborations (collaboration with Attenborough)
