= List of 1986 box office number-one films in the United Kingdom =

This is a list of films which have placed number one at the weekly box office in the United Kingdom during 1986.

== Number one films ==
| † | This implies the highest-grossing movie of the year. |

| # | Week ending | Film | Notes | Ref |
|---|---|---|---|---|
| 1 | 3 January 1986 | Back to the Future † | | |
| 2 | 10 January 1986 | Back to the Future † | | |
| 3 | 17 January 1986 | Back to the Future † | | |
| 4 | 24 January 1986 | Back to the Future † | | |
| 5 | 31 January 1986 | Rocky IV | Rocky IV grossed a record £1,780,894 in its first five days | |
| 6 | 7 February 1986 | Rocky IV | | |
| 7 | 14 February 1986 | Rocky IV | | |
| 8 | 21 February 1986 | Rocky IV | | |
| 9 | 28 February 1986 | Rocky IV | | |
| 10 | 7 March 1986 | Rocky IV | | |
| 11 | 14 March 1986 | Out of Africa | | |
| 12 | 21 March 1986 | Out of Africa | | |
| 13 | 28 March 1986 | Clockwise | Clockwise reached number one in its second week of release | |
| 14 | 4 April 1986 | Bambi (reissue) | The reissue of Bambi reached number one in its second week of release | |
| 15 | 11 April 1986 | Bambi (reissue) | | |
| 16 | 18 April 1986 | Out of Africa | | |
| 17 | 25 April 1986 | Out of Africa | | |
| 18 | 2 May 1986 | Out of Africa | | |
| 19 | 9 May 1986 | Out of Africa | | |
| 20 | 16 May 1986 | Jagged Edge | Jagged Edge reached number one in its tenth week of release | |
| 21 | 23 May 1986 | The Jewel of the Nile | The Jewel of the Nile reached number one in its third week of release | |
| 22 | 30 May 1986 | The Jewel of the Nile | | |
| 23 | 6 June 1986 | The Jewel of the Nile | | |
| 24 | 13 June 1986 | The Jewel of the Nile | | |
| 25 | 20 June 1986 | The Jewel of the Nile | | |
| 26 | 27 June 1986 | Down and Out in Beverly Hills | | |
| 27 | 4 July 1986 | Down and Out in Beverly Hills | | |
| 28 | 11 July 1986 | Down and Out in Beverly Hills | | |
| 29 | 18 July 1986 | Police Academy 3: Back in Training | | |
| 30 | 25 July 1986 | Police Academy 3: Back in Training | | |
| 31 | 1 August 1986 | The Karate Kid Part II | | |
| 32 | 8 August 1986 | Cobra | | |
| 33 | 15 August 1986 | The Karate Kid Part II | The Karate Kid Part II returned to number one in its third week of release | |
| 34 | 22 August 1986 | Hannah and Her Sisters | Hannah and Her Sisters reached number one in its fifth week of release | |
| 35 | 29 August 1986 | Hannah and Her Sisters | | |
| 36 | 5 September 1986 | Highlander | | |
| 37 | 12 September 1986 | Highlander | | |
| 38 | 19 September 1986 | Aliens | Aliens reached number one in its third week of release | |
| 39 | 26 September 1986 | Aliens | | |
| 40 | 3 October 1986 | Aliens | | |
| 41 | 10 October 1986 | Mona Lisa | Mona Lisa reached number one in its sixth week of release | |
| 42 | 17 October 1986 | Mona Lisa | | |
| 43 | 24 October 1986 | Mona Lisa | | |
| 44 | 31 October 1986 | Cinderella (reissue) | Cinderella reached number one in its second week of release | |
| 45 | 7 November 1986 | Top Gun | Top Gun reached number one in its fifth week of release | |
| 46 | 14 November 1986 | Top Gun | | |
| 47 | 21 November 1986 | Top Gun | | |
| 48 | 28 November 1986 | Top Gun | | |
| 49 | 5 December 1986 | Top Gun | | |
| 50 | 12 December 1986 | Labyrinth | | |
| 51 | 19 December 1986 | Labyrinth | | |
| 52 | 26 December 1986 | Labyrinth | | |

== Highest-grossing films ==
Highest-grossing films in the U.K. between 1 December 1985 and 30 November 1986

| Rank | Title |
|---|---|
| 1. | Back to the Future |
| 2. | Rocky IV |
| 3. | Out of Africa |
| 4. | Top Gun |
| 5. | Santa Claus: The Movie |
| 6. | Aliens |
| 7. | Police Academy 3: Back in Training |
| 8. | Clockwise |
| 9. | Teen Wolf |
| 10. | The Jewel of the Nile |

== See also ==
- List of British films — British films by year
- Lists of box office number-one films

== Chronology ==
| Preceded by 1985 | 1986 | Succeeded by 1987 |
