= Letter to Brezhnev =

1985 British film by Chris Bernard

- Promotional movie poster for the film
- Directed by: Chris Bernard
- Written by: Frank Clarke
- Produced by: Stephen Woolley; Janet Goddard; Catherine Spack
- Starring: Alexandra Pigg; Margi Clarke; Alfred Molina; Peter Firth; Tracy Lea
- Cinematography: Bruce McGowan
- Edited by: Lesley Walker
- Music by: Alan Gill
- Distributed by: Channel Four Films
- Release date: 8 November 1985 (UK)
- Running time: 94 minutes
- Country: United Kingdom
- Language: English
- Budget: £50,000 or £379,000
- Box office: £450,000 (UK)

Letter to Brezhnev is a 1985 British romantic comedy film about working-class life in Liverpool, written by Frank Clarke and directed by Chris Bernard. It stars Alexandra Pigg, Margi Clarke, Alfred Molina, Peter Firth and Tracy Marshak-Nash (credited as Tracy Lea). Letter to Brezhnev presents Margaret Thatcher-era, high-unemployment Liverpool as a depressed and tough city fallen on hard times. The film premiered at the 42nd Venice International Film Festival, in the Venezia Giovani (Venice Youth) sidebar.

== Plot and themes ==
Two young women from Kirkby, a rough suburb of Liverpool, Teresa and Elaine, meet two Russian sailors, Sergei and Peter, and hook up for a night of fun and frolics. Teresa is looking for sex and a smile; Elaine wants love, romance and the dream of a life far away from the grime of Liverpool.

Among other themes, it reflects the constraints on working class women's dreams. It also shows that many people do not get the chance to aspire to anything other than the humdrum lives they find before them as they finish school. Some of the characters work in a chicken factory, a slaughterhouse. It also reflects hope and ambition as despite awful odds, the protagonists pursue their dreams.

== Cast ==
- Alexandra Pigg – Elaine
- Margi Clarke – Teresa
- Peter Firth – Peter
- Alfred Molina – Sergei
- Tracy Lea – Tracy
- Iggy Navarro – President of Soviet Union
- Ken Campbell – Newspaper reporter
- Angela Clarke – Josie (Elaine's sister)
- Ted Wood – Mick
- Sharon Power – Charlie's Girl

== Production ==
The film was shot in three weeks on a small budget with fees deferred to those involved. Scenes were filmed in the State Nightclub, a prominent Liverpool venue in the 1980s. It assisted Liverpool in becoming the second most filmed city in the UK after London. For the soundtrack, Sandie Shaw re-recorded the song "Always Something There to Remind Me", and an early version of Bronski Beat's "Hit That Perfect Beat" was also used.

== Reception ==
Los Angeles Times critic Kevin Thomas described Letter to Brezhnev as "a winner, [and] further evidence of the enduring renewal of the British film industry". Walter Goodman of The New York Times wrote: "The zesty script by Frank Clarke is at once shamelessly romantic ('You look to the star and think of me') and unromantically streetwise ('Talk about roamin' hands and Russian fingers')." Roger Ebert of the Chicago Sun-Times concluded:

Letter to Brezhnev is strong because it is simple. It is not really about romance at all. It is about how idealism can be a way of escaping from the rat race. It is about a young woman with the courage to try something dramatic to break out of the trap she's in. It is also about a brave new tradition in British filmmaking, in which the heroes are ordinary people, seen with love.

Kate Muir, writing for The Times in 2017, said the film "creaks a little with age and its crew of young actors sometimes seems stagey. Yet it has ebullient energy". The reviewer for the BFI's Screenonline website described it as having "done more than perhaps any other film before or since in putting Liverpool on the cinematic map".

The film opened at the top of the UK box office where it remained for two weeks.

Letter to Brezhnev holds a 100% rating on Rotten Tomatoes based on six reviews.

In 2026 Letter to Brezhnev was readapted into a stage play.
