= List of 1987 box office number-one films in the United Kingdom =

This is a list of films which have placed number one at the box office in the United Kingdom during 1987.

== Number one films ==
†	This implies the highest-grossing movie of the year.

#	Weekend ending	Film	Gross	Notes	Ref
1	4 January 1987	Labyrinth	£340,205		
2	11 January 1987	Crocodile Dundee †	£997,251	Crocodile Dundee reached number one in its fifth week of release	
3	18 January 1987	Crocodile Dundee †	£1,156,562		
4	25 January 1987	Crocodile Dundee †	£1,043,308		
5	1 February 1987	Crocodile Dundee †	£1,145,064		
6	8 February 1987	Crocodile Dundee †	£1,044,232		
7	15 February 1987	Crocodile Dundee †	£851,584		
8	22 February 1987	Crocodile Dundee †	£681,671		
9	1 March 1987	Crocodile Dundee †	£583,684		
10	8 March 1987	The Fly	TBD	The Fly reached number one in its fourth week of release with a gross of £724,172 for the week	
11	15 March 1987	The Color of Money	£424,108	The Color of Money reached number one in its second week of release	
12	22 March 1987	The Color of Money	£360,384		
13	29 March 1987	The Color of Money	TBD	The Color of Money grossed £371,328 for the week	
14	5 April 1987	Over the Top	£329,826		
15	12 April 1987	Over the Top	TBD	Over the Top grossed £474,545 for the week	
16	19 April 1987	Star Trek IV: The Voyage Home	£476,170	Star Trek IV: The Voyage Home reached number one in its second week of release	
17	26 April 1987	Star Trek IV: The Voyage Home	£340,143		
18	3 May 1987	Star Trek IV: The Voyage Home	£278,566		
19	10 May 1987	Platoon	£270,699	Platoon reached number one in its third week of release	
20	17 May 1987	Platoon	£224,254		
21	24 May 1987	Platoon	£165,789		
22	31 May 1987	Platoon	TBD	Platoon grossed £402,171 for the week	
23	7 June 1987	Platoon	£338,582		
24	14 June 1987	Mannequin	£172,943	Mannequin reached number one in its fourth week of release	
25	21 June 1987	Mannequin	£162,145		
26	28 June 1987	The Secret of My Success	£351,340		
27	5 July 1987	The Secret of My Success	£217,100		
28	12 July 1987	Police Academy 4: Citizens on Patrol	£690,098	Police Academy 4 reached number one in its second week of release	
29	19 July 1987	Police Academy 4: Citizens on Patrol	£579,659		
30	26 July 1987	Superman IV: The Quest for Peace	£508,468		
31	2 August 1987	The Living Daylights	£389,661	The Living Daylights reached number one in its fifth week of release	
32	9 August 1987	The Living Daylights	£341,519		
33	16 August 1987	The Living Daylights	£410,727		
34	23 August 1987	The Living Daylights	£401,833		
35	30 August 1987	Lethal Weapon	£444,098		
36	6 September 1987	Lethal Weapon	£352,961		
37	13 September 1987	Full Metal Jacket	£336,532		
38	20 September 1987	Full Metal Jacket	£282,134		
39	27 September 1987	The Untouchables	£359,911	The Untouchables reached number one in its second week of release	
40	4 October 1987	The Untouchables	£350,540		
41	11 October 1987	Beverly Hills Cop II	£1,008,450	Beverly Hills Cop II set a record for an opening weekend	
42	18 October 1987	Beverly Hills Cop II	TBD	Beverly Hills Cop II grossed £1.4 million for the week	
43	25 October 1987	Beverly Hills Cop II	£549,908		
44	1 November 1987	Beverly Hills Cop II	TBD	Beverly Hills Cop II grossed £593,328 for the week	
45	8 November 1987	A Nightmare on Elm Street 3: Dream Warriors	£539,524	A Nightmare on Elm Street 3: Dream Warriors reached number one in its second week of release	
46	15 November 1987	A Nightmare on Elm Street 3: Dream Warriors	£385,698		
47	22 November 1987	The Witches of Eastwick	£271,218	The Witches of Eastwick reached number one in its fifth week of release	
48	29 November 1987	Innerspace	£434,710		
49	6 December 1987	Innerspace	£349,777		
50	13 December 1987	Big Foot and the Hendersons	£253,633		
51	20 December 1987	Snow White and the Seven Dwarfs (reissue)	TBD	The reissue of Snow White and the Seven Dwarfs reached number one in its second week of release	
52	27 December 1987	Masters of the Universe	TBD	Masters of the Universe grossed £797,620 for the week	

== Highest-grossing films ==
Highest-grossing films in the U.K. between 1 December 1986 and 30 November 1987

Rank	Title	Distributor	Gross
1.	Crocodile Dundee	UK/20th Century Fox	£20,072,702
2.	The Living Daylights	UIP	£8,160,628
3.	Beverly Hills Cop II	UIP	£5,782,730
4.	Platoon	Rank	£4,653,069
5.	Police Academy 4: Citizens on Patrol	Columbia-Cannon-Warner/Warner Bros.	£4,153,814
6.	The Golden Child	UIP	£4,029,571
7.	Labyrinth	Columbia-Cannon-Warner/Columbia Pictures	£3,572,272
8.	Superman IV: The Quest for Peace	Columbia-Cannon-Warner/Cannon Films	£3,457,959
9.	Full Metal Jacket	Columbia-Cannon-Warner/Warner Bros.	£2,983,460
10.	Blind Date	Columbia-Cannon-Warner/Columbia	£2,844,514

Highest-grossing films of 1987 by BBFC rating
U	Labyrinth
PG	The Living Daylights
15	Crocodile Dundee
18	Full Metal Jacket

== See also ==
- List of British films — British films by year
- Lists of box office number-one films

== Chronology ==
Preceded by 1986	1987	Succeeded by 1988
