= List of 1988 box office number-one films in the United Kingdom =

This is a list of films which have placed number one at the weekend box office in the United Kingdom during 1988.

== Number one films ==
#	Weekend ending	Film	Gross	Notes	Ref
1	3 January 1988	Masters of the Universe	£342,680		
2	10 January 1988	Predator	£598,537	Predator reached number one in its second week of release	
3	17 January 1988	Fatal Attraction	£904,240	Fatal Attraction grossed a record £2,048,421 in its opening week	
4	24 January 1988	Fatal Attraction	£1,057,905		
5	31 January 1988	Fatal Attraction	£1,010,184		
6	7 February 1988	Fatal Attraction	£818,556		
7	14 February 1988	Fatal Attraction	TBD	Fatal Attraction grossed £2,100,361 for the week	
8	21 February 1988	Fatal Attraction	TBD	Fatal Attraction grossed £1,135,617 for the week	
9	28 February 1988	Fatal Attraction	£526,317		
10	6 March 1988	Fatal Attraction	£379,432		
11	13 March 1988	Stakeout	£305,456		
12	20 March 1988	Fatal Attraction	£241,267	Fatal Attraction returned to number one in its tenth week of release	
13	27 March 1988	Empire of the Sun	£177,125		
14	3 April 1988	The Fox and the Hound (reissue)	£203,544	The reissue of The Fox and the Hound reached number one in its second week of release	
15	10 April 1988	Empire of the Sun	£203,759	Empire of the Sun returned to number one in its third week of release	
16	17 April 1988	Moonstruck	£230,491	Moontruck reached number one in its fourth week of release	
17	24 April 1988	Moonstruck	£214,145		
18	1 May 1988	Three Men and a Baby	£1,097,870	Three Men and a Baby reached number one in its fifth week of release	
19	8 May 1988	Three Men and a Baby	£890,632		
20	15 May 1988	Three Men and a Baby	TBD	Three Men and a Baby grossed £881,822 for the week	
21	22 May 1988	Three Men and a Baby	£400,022		
22	29 May 1988	Three Men and a Baby	£391,156		
23	5 June 1988	Three Men and a Baby	£327,343		
24	12 June 1988	Three Men and a Baby	£218,076		
25	19 June 1988	Three Men and a Baby	£157,189		
26	26 June 1988	Crocodile Dundee II	£1,333,508	Crocodile Dundee II had a record opening weekend surpassing Beverly Hills Cop II's £1,008,450	
27	3 July 1988	Crocodile Dundee II	£1,289,810		
28	10 July 1988	Crocodile Dundee II	£996,082		
29	17 July 1988	Crocodile Dundee II	£622,845		
30	24 July 1988	Crocodile Dundee II	£589,603		
31	31 July 1988	The Jungle Book (reissue)	£592,922	The reissue of The Jungle Book reached number one in its sixth week of release	
32	7 August 1988	Coming to America	£521,566	Coming to America reached number one in its second week of release	
33	14 August 1988	Coming to America	£600,969		
34	21 August 1988	Beetlejuice	£524,740		
35	28 August 1988	Rambo III	£551,189		
36	4 September 1988	Rambo III	£318,227		
37	11 September 1988	Beetlejuice	£214,901	Beetlejuice returned to number one in its fourth week of release	
38	18 September 1988	Frantic	£219,232		
39	25 September 1988	The Running Man	£577,953		
40	2 October 1988	Good Morning, Vietnam	£767,851		
41	9 October 1988	Good Morning, Vietnam	£742,164		
42	16 October 1988	Buster	TBD	Buster reached number one in its fifth week of release with a weekly gross of £1,085,213	
43	23 October 1988	A Fish Called Wanda	£718,594	A Fish Called Wanda reached number one in its second week of release	
44	30 October 1988	A Fish Called Wanda	£761,468		
45	6 November 1988	A Fish Called Wanda	£670,486		
46	13 November 1988	A Fish Called Wanda	£723,628		
47	20 November 1988	A Fish Called Wanda	£629,032		
48	27 November 1988	Scrooged	£548,212		
49	4 December 1988	Who Framed Roger Rabbit	£1,506,863	Who Framed Roger Rabbit surpassed the opening weekend record set by Crocodile Dundee II	
50	11 December 1988	Who Framed Roger Rabbit	£1,280,841		
51	18 December 1988	Who Framed Roger Rabbit	£901,811		
52	25 December 1988	Who Framed Roger Rabbit	TBD		

== Highest-grossing films ==
Highest-grossing films in the U.K. between 1 December 1987 and 18 December 1988.

Rank	Title	Distributor	U.K. Gross
1.	Fatal Attraction	UIP	£15,441,584
2.	Crocodile Dundee II	UIP	£13,324,673
3.	Three Men and a Baby	Touchstone Pictures/Warner Bros.	£9,662,992
4.	A Fish Called Wanda	UIP	£8,509,357
5.	Coming to America	UIP	£5,808,136
6.	Who Framed Roger Rabbit	Touchstone Pictures/Warner Bros.	£5,604,360
7.	Good Morning, Vietnam	Touchstone Pictures/Warner Bros.	£5,213,785
8.	The Last Emperor	Columbia/Tri-Star	£4,070,826
9.	The Jungle Book (reissue)	Walt Disney/Warner Bros.	£3,944,843
10.	Buster	Vestron	£3,809,021

Highest-grossing films of 1988 by BBFC rating
U	The Jungle Book (reissue)
PG	Crocodile Dundee II
15	A Fish Called Wanda
18	Fatal Attraction

== See also ==
- List of British films — British films by year
- Lists of box office number-one films

== Chronology ==
Preceded by 1987	1988	Succeeded by 1989
