= Angela Clarke (English actress) =

English actress

Angela Clark =
- Born: 1969 (age 56–57); Liverpool, Lancashire, England
- Occupations: Actress, writer
- Years active: 1983–2000
- Family: Frank Clarke (brother); Margi Clarke (sister)

Angela Clarke (born 1969) is an English actress best known for playing Colette Daly in the television drama series Soldier Soldier. She has also appeared in Brookside, Coronation Street, Liverpool 1, The Bill, Pie in the Sky, Family Affairs and Casualty.

She was brought up in the family home in Colwall Road in Kirkby, a town on the outskirts of Liverpool.

She is the younger sister of actress Margi Clarke, with whom she appeared in the films Letter to Brezhnev (1985) and Blonde Fist (1991), and screenwriter Frank Clarke (Brookside and Letter to Brezhnev).
