= The Good Sex Guide =

- Starring: Margi Clarke
- Country of origin: United Kingdom

Production
- Running time: 30 minutes
- Production company: Carlton Television

Original release
- Network: ITV
- Release: 11 January 1993 – 10 February 1996

The Good Sex Guide is a British documentary TV series presented by Margi Clarke, broadcast on late nights on ITV. It was announced to the public on 30 November 1992 and was described as "adult sex education", with a format combining comedy and drama sketches with factual material.

The show ran for three series. It gained unheard-of audience figures of 13 million for a show that aired at 10.35pm, and was rewarded with a win at the Royal Television Society (RTS) Awards for "Best Female Presenter" in 1994. A second series was equally successful, and a third, The Good Sex Guide Abroad, soon followed. Clarke turned down an offer to take the series into a late night chat show format, the host eventually being Toyah Willcox.
