= List of 1989 box office number-one films in the United Kingdom =

This is a list of films which have placed number one at the weekly box office in the United Kingdom during 1989.

== Number one films ==
†	This implies the highest-grossing movie of the year.

#	Week ending	Film	Gross	Notes	Ref
1	5 January 1989	Who Framed Roger Rabbit	£1,872,068		
2	12 January 1989	Who Framed Roger Rabbit	£1,299,148		
3	19 January 1989	Who Framed Roger Rabbit	£959,583		
4	26 January 1989	Cocktail	£1,555,192		
5	2 February 1989	Cocktail	£1,293,502		
6	9 February 1989	Die Hard	£1,018,484		
7	16 February 1989	Die Hard	£754,902		
8	23 February 1989	The Naked Gun: From the Files of Police Squad!	£1,856,507	The Naked Gun: From the Files of Police Squad! reached number one in its second week of release	
9	2 March 1989	The Naked Gun: From the Files of Police Squad!	£1,552,284		
10	9 March 1989	The Naked Gun: From the Files of Police Squad!	£1,142,505		
11	16 March 1989	Rain Man	£1,313,861	Rain Man reached number one in its second week of release	
12	23 March 1989	Twins	£1,489,504		
13	30 March 1989	Twins	£1,415,719		
14	6 April 1989	Rain Man	£1,137,797	Rain Man returned to number one in its fifth week of release	
15	13 April 1989	Rain Man	TBD		
16	20 April 1989	Working Girl	£773,780		
17	27 April 1989	Rain Man	TBD	Rain Man returned to number one in its eighth week of release	
18	4 May 1989	My Stepmother Is an Alien	TBD	My Stepmother is an Alien reached number one in its second week of release	
19	11 May 1989	A Nightmare on Elm Street 4: The Dream Master	TBD		
20	18 May 1989	A Nightmare on Elm Street 4: The Dream Master	TBD		
21	25 May 1989	Mississippi Burning	TBD	Mississippi Burning reached number one in its third week of release	
22	1 June 1989	Mississippi Burning	TBD		
23	8 June 1989	Mississippi Burning	TBD		
24	15 June 1989	Beaches	TBD	Beaches reached number one in its third week of release	
25	22 June 1989	Hellbound: Hellraiser II	TBD		
26	29 June 1989	Licence to Kill	TBD	Licence to Kill reached number one in its second week of release	
27	6 July 1989	Indiana Jones and the Last Crusade †	TBD	Indiana Jones and the Last Crusade grossed a record £1,811,542 in its opening weekend and £3,125,434 in its opening week beating the records set by Crocodile Dundee II	
28	13 July 1989	Indiana Jones and the Last Crusade †	TBD		
29	20 July 1989	Indiana Jones and the Last Crusade †	TBD		
30	27 July 1989	Indiana Jones and the Last Crusade †	TBD		
31	3 August 1989	Indiana Jones and the Last Crusade †	TBD		
32	10 August 1989	Indiana Jones and the Last Crusade †	TBD		
33	17 August 1989	Batman	TBD	Batman beat the opening weekend and week records set in July by Indiana Jones and the Last Crusade with a gross of £2,058,159 for the weekend and £3,945,527 for the week	
34	24 August 1989	Batman	TBD	Batman grossed £1.26 million for the weekend	
35	31 August 1989	Batman	TBD		
36	7 September 1989	Batman	TBD		
37	14 September 1989	See No Evil, Hear No Evil	TBD	See No Evil, Hear No Evil reached number one in its second week of release	
38	21 September 1989	Lethal Weapon 2	TBD		
39	28 September 1989	Lethal Weapon 2	TBD		
40	5 October 1989	Dead Poets Society	TBD	Dead Poets Society reached number one in its second week of release	
41	12 October 1989	Dead Poets Society	TBD		
42	19 October 1989	Young Einstein	TBD		
43	26 October 1989	Young Einstein	TBD		
44	2 November 1989	Shirley Valentine	TBD	Shirley Valentine reached number one in its third week of release	
45	9 November 1989	Shirley Valentine	TBD		
46	16 November 1989	Shirley Valentine	TBD		
47	23 November 1989	Wilt	TBD	Wilt reached number one in its third week of release	
48	30 November 1989	Back to the Future Part II	TBD		
49	7 December 1989	Back to the Future Part II	TBD		
50	14 December 1989	Back to the Future Part II	TBD		
51	21 December 1989	Back to the Future Part II	TBD		
52	28 December 1989	Back to the Future Part II	TBD	Back to the Future Part II grossed £707,726 for the week	

== Highest-grossing films ==
Highest-grossing films in the U.K. between 1 December 1988 and 21 December 1989

Rank	Title	Distributor	Gross (US$)
1.	Indiana Jones and the Last Crusade	Paramount Pictures/UIP	25,732,000
2.	Who Framed Roger Rabbit	Touchstone Pictures/Warner Bros.	25,384,000
3.	Batman	Warner Bros.	19,413,000
4.	Rain Man	United Artists/UIP	15,560,000
5.	The Naked Gun: From the Files of Police Squad!	Paramount/UIP	12,464,000
6.	Back to the Future Part II	Universal Pictures/UIP	12,194,000 (Note: The chart per The Guinness Book of Box Office Hits does not list Back to the Future Part II.)
7.	Licence to Kill	United Artists/UIP	12,157,000
8.	Lethal Weapon 2	Warner Bros.	10,815,000
9.	Twins	Universal/UIP	10,547,000
10.	Shirley Valentine	Paramount/UIP	9,954,000 (Note: The chart per The Guinness Book of Box Office Hits lists Dead Poets Society and Cocktail higher than Shirley Valentine. For the period, Variety reported grosses of $9,953,000 and $9,329,000 for those films respectively.)

== See also ==
- List of British films — British films by year
- Lists of box office number-one films

== Chronology ==
Preceded by 1988	1989	Succeeded by 1990
