= Blonde Fist =

- Theatrical release poster
- Directed by: Frank Clarke
- Written by: Frank Clarke
- Produced by: Joseph D'Morais/Christopher Figg
- Starring: Margi Clarke; Carroll Baker; Ken Hutchison; Sharon Power; Jane Porter; Angela Clarke
- Production company: Blue Dolphin Films
- Distributed by: Blue Dolphin Films
- Release date: 9 August 1991
- Running time: 102 minutes
- Country: United Kingdom
- Language: English
- Budget: £1.1 million
- Box office: £2,502 (UK)

Blonde Fist (or Blond Fist) is a 1991 sports film directed by Frank Clarke and starring Margi Clarke as the protagonist Ronnie O'Dowd, who finds female boxing as an alternative to her domestic problems. The film received a generally poor reception.

== Plot ==
Set in Kirkby, Liverpool, the plot centres around Ronnie O'Dowd, a single mother born to a Scottish father who championed in street boxing and her more gentle, ‘ladylike’ mother who dislikes her husband participating in street boxing.

Ronnie’s mother gives birth to Ronnie in the middle of a street market, on a sack of budgie feed.

After the father of her son is arrested, Ronnie struggles to make ends meet against a corrupt social system that treats working class mothers with contempt.

Ronnie has a keen sense of social justice and defends a neighbouring child from bullies and a bully’s unrepentant mother. However, Ronnie’s quick temper sees her beat up her ex boyfriend’s corrupt social-worker girlfriend and she is sentenced to 12 months in prison.

Driven by dreams of a better life and determined to put the pieces of her fractured family life back together to gain a sense of identity, Ronnie escapes prison with her cellmate. She blackmails her ex boyfriend for the funds to get to New York, where her father is said to be living the high life of a ‘tycoon’.

However, arriving in NYC with her son she finds out her father is an alcoholic working as a dishwasher at a hotel. There she meets ex-show girl ‘Lovelle’ from Kentucky who now makes a living as a maid. The two women strike up a friendship.

Whilst out in NYC, Ronnie sees a poster advertising ‘Knucklers’, a nightclub featuring amateur women boxers. When Ronnie and Lovelle visit the place, the absence of one of the boxers leads the ring announcer to offer $1,000 to the woman who lasts at least 3 minutes in the ring with his fighter. Ronnie eagerly accepts, intending to last the three minutes, but her opponent turns aggressive, forcing Ronnie to knock her out.

When Ronnie later receives an invitation for another boxing match from the manager of Knucklers, Lovelle persuades him to up the winning prize to $10,000.

Ronnie begs her father to stop drinking and come and support her at the boxing match, promising she will take him home with her and her son if she wins. Ronnie’s father tells her she will never see him again if she goes to fight. This is because he promised her mother there would be no more fighting in the family.

Come fight night, she is matched with Crazy Sue, a more skilled opponent. Just before the bell Ronnie and Lovelle learn that this will be a ten-minute fight because of the higher prize money even though it appears this change is meant to favor her better trained opponent. Initially Ronnie has the upper hand but Sue recomposes herself and knocks her down twice. Even blackening Ronnie’s left eye. Sue ultimately corners Ronnie and pummeled her relentlessly by one of the ring's corners when Ronnie’s father suddenly appears at ringside and cheers her on, Ronnie manages to knock Sue out and wins the $10,000 prize.

Ronnie, her son and father head back to Liverpool. She asks Lovelle to join them but Lovelle feels too old to start a new life and the four share an emotional farewell.

On the ferry back to Liverpool, Ronnie’s dad gifts her a boxing champion belt he has made for her and they embrace as the ferry speeds back towards the Liver Buildings on the River Mersey.

== Cast ==
- Margi Clarke as Ronnie O'Dowd
- Carroll Baker as Lovelle Summers
- Ken Hutchison as John O'Dowd
- Sharon Power as Mary
- Angela Clarke as Brenda Doyle
- Gary Mavers as Tony Bone
- Jane Porter as Big Alice
- Tina Malone as Mrs Crane
- Susan Atkins as "Crazy Sue"
- Stephen Graham as Young Boy

== Reception ==
The film received generally poor reviews from critics.
