= Shirley Valentine (film) =

1989 British film by Lewis Gilbert

- Theatrical release poster
- Directed by: Lewis Gilbert
- Screenplay by: Willy Russell
- Based on: Shirley Valentine (play) by Willy Russell
- Produced by: Lewis Gilbert
- Starring: Pauline Collins; Tom Conti
- Cinematography: Alan Hume
- Edited by: Lesley Walker
- Music by: Marvin Hamlisch
- Distributed by: Paramount Pictures
- Release dates: 24 August 1989 (MWFF); 30 August 1989 (US); 13 October 1989 (London)
- Running time: 108 minutes
- Country: United Kingdom
- Language: English
- Box office: $38 million

Shirley Valentine is a 1989 British romantic comedy-drama film directed by Lewis Gilbert. The screenplay by Willy Russell is based on his 1986 one-character play of the same title, which follows middle-aged Shirley Valentine in an unexpected discovery of herself and the rekindling of her childhood dreams and youthful love of life.

Pauline Collins reprises the title role as middle-aged housewife Shirley, which she had previously played in the stage production in London's West End and on Broadway, and Tom Conti plays Costas Dimitriades, the owner of a Greek tavern with whom she has a holiday romance.

== Plot ==
Shirley Valentine is a bored 42-year-old working class Liverpudlian housewife whose life and initially enriching marriage has settled into a narrow and unsatisfying rut, leaving few genuine friends and her childhood dreams unaccomplished, and she feels as if her husband and children treat her more like a servant. When her flamboyant friend Jane wins a trip for two to Greece, Shirley uncharacteristically puts herself first and accepts Jane's invitation.

Shirley feels considerable self-doubt and ultimately only goes because of unexpected encouragement from her neighbour Gillian, who drops her air of superiority to reveal her respect and emotional support of Shirley's plans, and former school enemy Marjorie Majors, who admits she had, in fact, been envious of Shirley's rebellious role at school, and had become a high-class prostitute rather than a prestigious air hostess.

Upon arrival, Jane immediately abandons Shirley for a holiday romance with a fellow passenger from their flight, leaving Shirley to set out on her own. She begins to see her fellow holidaymakers through new eyes, as she genuinely enjoys Greece while they want British food and stereotypical entertainment. She remains contentedly alone until she meets Costas Dimitriades, the owner of a nearby tavern, who helps her fulfil a dream of drinking wine by the seashore in the country where the grapes were grown and later invites her to travel around the nearby islands for a day on his brother's boat. Costas promises not to try to seduce her while bolstering her self-confidence in her attractiveness.

As Shirley prepares for the trip, Jane returns and begs for forgiveness for abandoning her; Jane is then stunned to find that Shirley has made plans on her own and will be going out with Costas imminently. Enjoying the day out, Shirley decides to swim in the sea; lacking a swimsuit, she swims naked instead, with Costas joining her in the water. She realises that she does not want Costas to keep his promise. They kiss and, later on the boat, have very intense sex.

On her return, Jane believes Shirley has fallen in love with Costas, but Shirley reveals to the audience that she has fallen in love with the idea of living. She spends more time with Costas, and at the airport, she turns back and walks to Costas's tavern to find him attempting to seduce another tourist the same way. Costas is shocked to see Shirley after her departure, but she says she wants a job and is not upset at catching him in the act.

Initially angry and confused at her departure, Shirley's husband, Joe, waits for her return with a large armful of flowers. He is shocked and embarrassed to find Shirley chose to stay and is not on the plane, and repeatedly calls her, pleading and arguing for her to return, saying that it is her place and she is embarrassing him, or telling her that her actions result from a midlife crisis or menopause.

Shirley becomes more content with her new life. She also succeeds greatly with narrow-minded holidaymakers who want the same food as in Britain. Finally, their son tells Joe to go and get her instead of just phoning. Receiving a telegram about Joe's arrival, Costas makes excuses and leaves for the day, while Shirley is unperturbed. Joe walks from the airport. Shirley, wearing sunglasses and feeling like a different person, is sipping wine by the sea at sunset. Joe does not recognise her and walks past until she calls him back. The film ends with the two drinking wine by the sea.

== Cast ==
- Pauline Collins as Shirley Bradshaw
- Tom Conti as Costas Dimitriades
- Julia McKenzie as Gillian
- Alison Steadman as Jane
- Joanna Lumley as Marjorie Majors
- Sylvia Syms as Headmistress
- Bernard Hill as Joe Bradshaw
- George Costigan as Dougie
- Anna Keaveney as Jeanette
- Tracie Bennett as Millandra Bradshaw
- Ken Sharrock as Sydney
- Karen Craig as Thelma
- Gareth Jefferson as Brian Bradshaw
- Marc Zuber as Renos
- Gillian Kearney as young Shirley
- Catharine Duncan as young Marjorie
- Cardew Robinson as Londoner
- Honora Burke as Londoner's wife

== Production ==
=== Filming ===
The film was shot on location in Liverpool, Twickenham, Oxford Circus, Bloomsbury and St Pancras railway station in England, and on the island of Mykonos in Greece.

=== Music ===
The film's theme song, "The Girl Who Used to Be Me", was written by Marvin Hamlisch and Alan and Marilyn Bergman and performed by Patti Austin.

== Release ==
The film opened the Montreal World Film Festival at the Théâtre Maisonneuve on 24 August 1989. Unlike most openers of the festival in French-speaking Quebec, it was shown without French subtitles. The film opened in the United States and Canada on 30 August, in London on 13 October and in the UK on 27 October 1989.

=== Critical reception ===
Joe Brown of The Washington Post called the film "an uncommonly warm, relaxed little movie . . . without a cloying artificially sweetened aftertaste." He continued, "The story's a bit of romantic whimsy, but it affords a great many comfortable and comforting laughs, and may even serve as a wake-up call for some." Variety called the film "uneven but generally delightful" and Pauline Collins "irresistible." On Rotten Tomatoes, the film holds a rating of 72% from 18 reviews.

Radio Times rated the film four out of five stars and added, "Lewis Gilbert manages to retain the best of Willy Russell's theatrical devices while opening out the action to embrace a big-screen atmosphere. The supporting cast, particularly Bernard Hill as Collins's Neanderthal husband, is equally convincing, with only the hammy Conti (glistening teeth and appalling accent) striking a momentary false note." Among reviewers who found the film banal and hollow, Caryn James, of The New York Times observed, "By adding all the characters and settings that Shirley only talks about on stage, the film reveals the weakness of Mr. Russell's script as surely as if a magician's clumsy assistant had pointed a finger at a secret trapdoor. Ms. Collins brings as much energy and warmth to the role as ever, but on screen the strength of her performance is shattered by being chopped into tiny, disconnected bits."

Roger Ebert of the Chicago Sun-Times likewise rated the film one star, calling it "a realistic drama of appalling banality." He added, "There were moments during the movie when I cringed at the manipulative dialogue as the heroine recited warmed-over philosophy and inane one-liners when she should have been allowed to speak for herself. . . . Many of the sentiments in this film seem recycled directly from greeting cards . . . If there is a shred of plausibility in the film, it comes from Bernard Hill's performance as Shirley Valentine's husband. He isn't a bad bloke, just a tired and indifferent one, and when he follows his wife to Greece at the end of the film, there are a few moments so truthful that they show up the artifice of the rest."

=== Box office ===
In the UK, after opening nationwide, it was number one for three consecutive weeks and was the highest-grossing independent British film of the year, with a gross of £11.5 million. The film grossed $6.1 million in the United States and Canada. Worldwide, it grossed $38 million.

=== Awards and nominations ===
Award	Category	Nominee(s)	Result	Ref.
Academy Awards	Best Actress	Pauline Collins	Nominated	
Academy Awards	Best Original Song	"The Girl Who Used to Be Me"; Music by Marvin Hamlisch; Lyrics by Alan and Marilyn Bergman	Nominated	
British Academy Film Awards	Best Film	Lewis Gilbert	Nominated	
British Academy Film Awards	Best Actress in a Leading Role	Pauline Collins	Won	
British Academy Film Awards	Best Adapted Screenplay	Willy Russell	Nominated	
British Comedy Awards	Top Comedy Film		Won	
British Society of Cinematographers Awards	Best Cinematography in a Theatrical Feature Film	Alan Hume	Nominated	
Evening Standard British Film Awards	Best Actress	Pauline Collins	Won	
Evening Standard British Film Awards	Best Screenplay	Willy Russell	Won	
Golden Globe Awards	Best Motion Picture – Musical or Comedy		Nominated	
Golden Globe Awards	Best Actress in a Motion Picture – Musical or Comedy	Pauline Collins	Nominated	
Golden Globe Awards	Best Original Song – Motion Picture	"The Girl Who Used to Be Me"; Music by Marvin Hamlisch; Lyrics by Alan and Marilyn Bergman	Nominated	
Grammy Awards	Best Song Written Specifically for a Motion Picture or Television	"The Girl Who Used to Be Me" – Marvin Hamlisch, Alan and Marilyn Bergman	Nominated	
