= List of 1985 box office number-one films in the United Kingdom =

This is a list of films which have placed number one at the weekly box office in the United Kingdom during 1985.

== Number one films ==
†	This implies the highest-grossing movie of the year.

#	Week ending	Film	Notes	Ref
1	4 January 1985	Ghostbusters †		
2	11 January 1985	Ghostbusters †		
3	18 January 1985	Ghostbusters †		
4	25 January 1985	Ghostbusters †		
5	1 February 1985	Beverly Hills Cop		
6	8 February 1985	Beverly Hills Cop		
7	15 February 1985	A Private Function	A Private Function reached number one in its eleventh week of release	
8	22 February 1985	The Jungle Book (reissue)		
9	1 March 1985	Beverly Hills Cop	Beverly Hills Cop returned to number one in its fifth week of release	
10	8 March 1985	The Prodigal		
11	15 March 1985	The Witch		
12	22 March 1985	Dance with a Stranger	Dance with a Stranger reached number one in its third week of release	
13	29 March 1985	Dance with a Stranger		
14	5 April 1985	A Passage to India		
15	12 April 1985	A Passage to India		
16	19 April 1985	A Passage to India		
17	26 April 1985	A Passage to India		
18	3 May 1985	A Passage to India		
19	10 May 1985	A Private Function		
20	17 May 1985	The Cotton Club	The Cotton Club reached number one in its second week of release	
21	24 May 1985	Johnny Dangerously		
22	31 May 1985	Witness		
23	7 June 1985	Witness		
24	14 June 1985	Witness		
25	21 June 1985	A View to a Kill		
26	28 June 1985	A View to a Kill		
27	5 July 1985	A View to a Kill		
28	12 July 1985	Police Academy 2: Their First Assignment		
29	19 July 1985	Police Academy 2: Their First Assignment		
30	26 July 1985	Police Academy 2: Their First Assignment		
31	2 August 1985	Return to Oz	Return to Oz reached number one in its third week of release	
32	9 August 1985	Return to Oz		
33	16 August 1985	Best Defense		
34	23 August 1985	Best Defense		
35	30 August 1985	Best Defense		
36	6 September 1985	Rambo: First Blood Part II	Rambo: First Blood Part II grossed a record £1,085,513 for the weekend surpassing the record set by E.T. the Extra-Terrestrial	
37	13 September 1985	Desperately Seeking Susan		
38	20 September 1985	Desperately Seeking Susan		
39	27 September 1985	Desperately Seeking Susan		
40	4 October 1985	Desperately Seeking Susan		
41	11 October 1985	Desperately Seeking Susan		
42	18 October 1985	Peter Pan (reissue)		
43	25 October 1985	Peter Pan (reissue)		
44	1 November 1985	Peter Pan (reissue)		
45	8 November 1985	Peter Pan (reissue)		
46	15 November 1985	Letter to Brezhnev		
47	22 November 1985	Letter to Brezhnev		
48	29 November 1985	Cocoon	Cocoon reached number one in its eleventh week of release	
49	6 December 1985	Santa Claus: The Movie		
50	13 December 1985	Santa Claus: The Movie		
51	20 December 1985	Santa Claus: The Movie		
52	27 December 1985	Santa Claus: The Movie		

== Highest-grossing films ==
Rank	Title	Distributor
1.	Ghostbusters	Columbia Pictures-EMI-Warner Bros. (CEW)
2.	A View to a Kill	United International Pictures (UIP)
3.	Gremlins	CEW
4.	Rambo: First Blood Part II	CEW
5.	Beverly Hills Cop	UIP
6.	Police Academy 2: Their First Assignment	CEW
7.	Santa Claus: The Movie	Rank
8.	A Passage to India	CEW
9.	One Hundred and One Dalmatians	Walt Disney
10.	Desperately Seeking Susan	Rank

Highest-grossing films of 1985 by BBFC rating
U	Santa Claus: The Movie
PG	Ghostbusters
15	Gremlins
18	TBD

== See also ==
- List of British films — British films by year
- Lists of box office number-one films

== Chronology ==
1985	Succeeded by 1986
