= Chris Bernard =

English film director

- Born: 20 October 1955 (age 71); Liverpool, England
- Occupation: Film director
- Years active: 1985–2003

Chris Bernard (born 20 October 1955) is an English film director. He has directed eight films since 1985.

He was born in Liverpool, England and started his professional career in the theatre. In 1977 he developed an old warehouse, in Matthew Street, Liverpool into a theatre venue and was a founder member and Company Manager of the acclaimed Science Fiction Theatre of Liverpool which went on to open the National Theatre- Cottesloe Theatre with their celebrated production of ILLUMINATUS! Written and directed by Ken Campbell & Chris Langham and starring Prunella Gee, Jim Broadbent and David Rappaport.

Bernard directed his first play The Immortalist by Heathcote Williams and went on to direct others, most notably The Maids by Jean Genet, Lainey Robertson's The Insanity of Mary Girard and Heroes, about the war poet Wilfred Owen.

In 1988, he directed David Kane's television drama Shadow on the Earth, about two boys in a West Lothian mining village who suspect that their neighbour is an alien, which was broadcast as part of the BBC Screen Two anthology series.

After working as a script writer for the Channel 4 soap opera Brookside, his debut film was Letter to Brezhnev.

== Selected filmography ==
- Letter to Brezhnev (1985)
