= Kate Anthony =

English actress (born 1964)

- Born: 11 April 1964 (age 62); Leeds, West Riding of Yorkshire, England
- Occupation: Actress
- Years active: 1990–present
- Known for: Coronation Street (2008–2012)
- Spouse: Gary Barak
- Children: 2

Kate Anthony (born 11 April 1964) is an English actress best known for her role as Pam Hobsworth on the ITV soap Coronation Street.

== Career ==
She has appeared in Doctors playing Ellen Murray, Sparkhouse playing Jenny Bullock, Casualty playing Angela Phillips and As Time Goes By. More recently she has appeared in Totally Frank, Heartbeat and EastEnders playing Annie Grey. She played the role of Pam Hobsworth in the ITV soap Coronation Street from July 2008 to December 2010. She also had a small role in My Parents Are Aliens as the Inspector Mrs. Morris.

She has had numerous theatrical roles including The Cherry Orchard with Judi Dench and prior to taking the role in Coronation Street, she toured Scotland in The Odd Couple with her closest friend Gerard Kelly.

Anthony starred in Northern Broadsides' production of Rutherford and Son with Barrie Rutter, West Yorkshire Playhouse's Alan Bennett production of Untold Stories and the main role in Sheffield Theatres' production of Queen Coal.

In 2015 Anthony appeared as Ethel Davies in the BBC TV series Father Brown episode 3.14 "The Deadly Seal".

In 2016, she portrayed a Braavosi woman in the HBO series Game of Thrones in Season 6.

She starred in the UK and Irish touring production of Anything Goes as Evangeline Harcourt and then once again toured in the Northern Broadsides hit When We Are Married, as Clara Soppitt, which was directed by and starred Barrie Rutter.

Anthony has also recently been in the comedy series Boomers and is regularly on BBC Radio 4 in Tom Wrigglesworth's Hang Ups, playing Tom's mother.

In 2018 she appeared at the Royal Exchange, Manchester in Queens of The Coal Age, written by Maxine Peake.

In November 2021 she appeared as Hazel in Emmerdale as Andrea Tate's mother, to take legal guardianship of Jamie and Andrea's daughter Millie.

== Personal life ==
Anthony studied drama at the Webber Douglas Academy of Dramatic Art.

Anthony is married to former actor and racing driver Gary Barak, who is now better known as an automotive & motorsport PR man. They have two children.

In a 2016 interview, Anthony said that she kept kosher at home and while travelling and asked her agent not to book work on Rosh Hashanah or Yom Kippur.

== Filmography ==
=== Television ===
Year	Title	Role	Notes
1990	A Sense of Guilt	Clinic Nurse	Episode: "Episode 1.3"
1999	Wing and a Prayer	Court Clerk	Episode: "Episode 2.2"
2002–2016	Doctors	Betty Warren / Helen Morris / Ellie Murphy / Ellen Murphy / Ms. French	5 episodes
2002	An Angel for May	Mrs. Cranshaw	TV movie
2002	Sparkhouse	Jenny Bullock	TV Miniseries
2004	Casualty	Angela Phillips	Episode: "Where There's Life..."
2005	As Time Goes By	Sister	Episode: "Reunion Special: Part 2"
2005–2006	Totally Frank	Amanda	Episodes: "Debt", "2.6", "2.12"
2006	EastEnders	Dr. Annie Grey	Episodes: "8 September 2006" and "12 September 2006"
2007	Judge John Deed	WPC Lowry	Episode: "War Crimes: Part 1" and "War Crimes: Part 2"
2007	The Bill	Bev Morris	Episode: "Inner Demons"
2007	Holby City	Jill Prince	Episode: "The Q Word"
2008–2012	Coronation Street	Pam Hobsworth	Regular role, 128 episodes
2008	Little Miss Jocelyn	Unknown	Episode: "2.1" and "2.2"
2008	Heartbeat	Mrs Halloran	Episode: "England Expects"
2013	Casualty	Joyce Farrell	Episode: "There's No Place Like Home"
2015	Father Brown	Ethel Davies	Episode: "The Deadly Seal"
2015	Trollied	Shelia	Episode: "5.2"
2015	Citizen Khan	Nurse Baxtor	Episode: "Mytic Mo"
2016	Boomers	Christine	Episode: "Mick's Return"
2016	Game of Thrones	Braavosi Woman	Episode: "The Door"
2020	Doctors	Kathy Eliot	Episode: "A Little Faith"
2020	Casualty	Julia Ford	Episode: "Code Orange"
2021–2022	Emmerdale	Hazel	5 episodes
2025	Midsomer Murders	Mary Hamble	Episode: "Treasures of Darkness"
