= Margi Clarke =

English actress

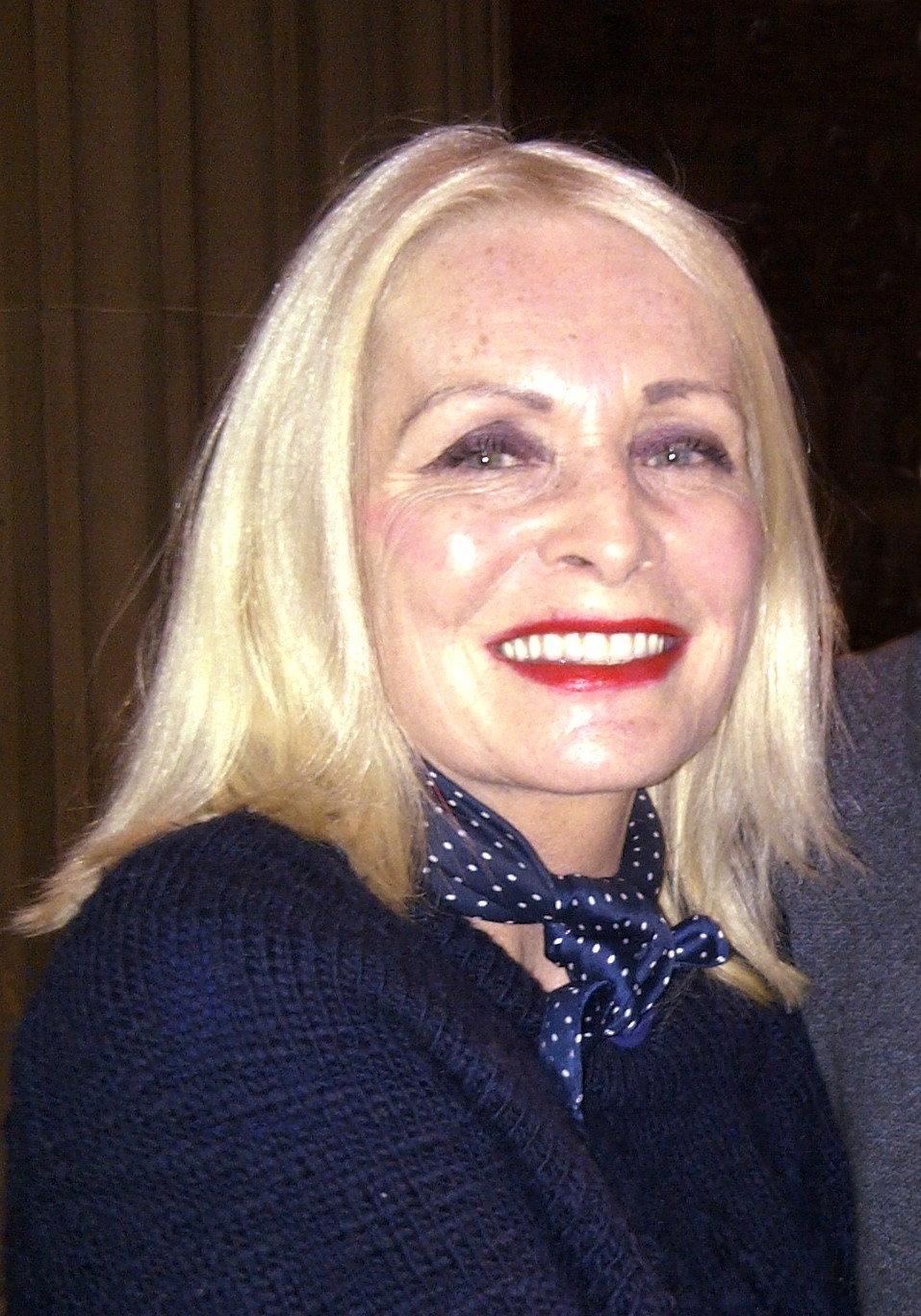
- Clarke in 2013
- Born: 25 May 1954 (age 72); Kirkby, Lancashire, England
- Other name: Margox
- Occupations: Actress, radio & television presenter
- Television: Making Out (1989–1991); The Good Sex Guide (1991); Coronation Street (1998–1999, 2008–2010)
- Partner: Jamie Reid (former)
- Children: 2
- Family: Frank Clarke (brother); Angela Clarke (sister)

Margi Clarke (born 25 May 1954) is an English actress and radio and television presenter. She had a leading role in the film Letter to Brezhnev (1985), a low-budget film which had an international release. Later, Clarke played Jackie Dobbs in the ITV soap opera Coronation Street (1998–1999, 2008–2010).

== Early life and career ==
Clarke was born and raised in Kirkby, Lancashire. Her career as a presenter began in 1978 on the late-night television magazine show What's On, broadcast only in the Granada region. From 1978 to 1985, she was the lead singer of various punk rock bands; including, Margox and the Zincs; which initially featured Holly Johnson and Andrew Schofield as guitarists.

In 1983, Clarke appeared as Fran, a CND campaigner, in two early episodes of the Liverpool-set Channel 4 soap opera Brookside, credited as Margi MacGregor. The first episode she appeared in was written by her brother, Frank Clarke.

She featured in the low-budget film Letter to Brezhnev (1985), the screenplay being adapted by her brother Frank from his own play. It tells the story of two working-class young women in Liverpool who meet two Russian sailors. The other lead role was played by Alexandra Pigg, who had a regular role in Brookside prior to the film. The film was made for around £50,000 (Clarke called this "the cocaine budget on Rambo"), and became an international hit. At the next Evening Standard British Film Awards, Clarke was awarded the prize for "Most Promising Newcomer". Clarke had originated her role of Theresa in Letter to Brezhnev two years earlier when she played the role in a modest run at the Liverpool Playhouse in 1983.

Clarke followed Letter to Brezhnev with a European trilogy for Finnish brothers Aki and Mika Kaurismäki: Helsinki Napoli All Night Long, I Hired a Contract Killer and L.A. Without a Map.

== Film actress and TV presenter ==
Clarke had a lead role in the films Letter to Brezhnev (1985), The Dressmaker (1988) and Strike It Rich (1990), and appeared in the Pet Shop Boys' video for their 1987 single,"Rent". She was the stand-in host for Paula Yates on Channel 4's The Tube on several occasions. Clarke was also the voice for the character of Bixie in Weetabix adverts.

In 1989, she was cast as Queenie in the BBC series Making Out, set in a Manchester electronics factory and written by Debbie Horsfield. The show ran for three series. In 1991, she returned to presenting, this time on the late night ITV show The Good Sex Guide which gained audience figures of 13 million. She received a Royal Television Society (RTS) Award for "Best Female Presenter" in 1994. A second series and third series followed. the last entitled The Good Sex Guide Abroad. Clarke turned down an offer to take the series into a late night chat show format, the host eventually being Toyah Willcox.

In 1991, Clarke performed with Half Man Half Biscuit on the single "No Regrets", a cover of the song, "Non, je ne regrette rien", best known from the version recorded by Édith Piaf. In the same year, she started in the film Blonde Fist. Clarke portrayed Ronnie O'Dowd, a female boxer who follows her father into the world of 'pugilism' and rescues him from being 'on the skids' in New York to bring him back to Liverpool with her prize money. The film was written and directed by Clarke's brother Frank Clarke, who had previously written Letter to Brezhnev.

Following the success of The Good Sex Guide, the ITV franchise holder Carlton offered Clarke her own day-time show, and the resulting programme, Swank, co-presented with fashion designer David Emanuel, ran for two series. In 1994, Clarke tried a new venture, stand-up comedy, and took her one-woman show 21st Century Scutt around the country - the tour included a stint at the Edinburgh Film Festival and the Royal Festival Hall on London's South Bank. She was a regular guest on Channel 4's music show The Word, including one occasion where she tricked presenter Terry Christian into showing his testicles in a hidden camera set-up.

Around this time, Clarke's partner was the artist Jamie Reid (known for his work with the Sex Pistols) and she was paid an undisclosed sum to pose nude while nine months pregnant with their daughter; the couple split up around 1997. The resulting pictures were a response to the then recent Vanity Fair spread of actress Demi Moore, in which she was shown nude while also nine months pregnant. The pictures of Clarke were published in the Sunday People tabloid. She also published her own vegetarian cookery book, Margi Clarke's Better than Sex Cookbook. In 1994, Clarke worked with Welsh political band Anhrefn for the single "Clutter from the Gutter".

Her last role before taking a three-year sabbatical, following the death of her mother and birth of her daughter, was in the BBC1 serial, Soul Survivors co-starring Ian McShane. She returned to acting in 1998, joining the soap opera Coronation Street, playing Jackie Dobbs. She left in 1999 and joined the cast of Five soap opera Family Affairs, staying for just under a year, as well as guesting in an episode of the BBC's Casualty.

She also had roles in two films released in 2002, Revengers Tragedy (adapted from the 17th century play), directed by Alex Cox and 24 Hour Party People, the biopic of the Factory/Hacienda days in Manchester, which Clarke participated in during her 'Margox' days of the 1970s. In feature film The Boys from County Clare (2003), she played the role of Dove.

== Since 2004 ==
In 2004, Clarke appeared on the Five reality TV show The Farm and had a leading role in the theatrical film School for Seduction co-starring Kelly Brook. In 2006, Clarke had a role in an episode of the Hollyoaks spin-off Hollyoaks: In the City and around the same time she was also a contestant on a celebrity version of the BBC gameshow The Weakest Link.

Clarke is often referred to as "The Queen of Liverpool" by the media. This tag was originally attributed to Clarke by music promoter Malcolm McLaren. In 2005, she began her successful on-line health and beauty range "Soul Rinse" which she runs parallel to her acting career. In 2006–2007, she was heard on the airwaves of North-West radio station 105.4 Century Radio as co-presenter of the breakfast show and their late-night phone-in shows.

In August 2007, Clarke was a guest on Big Brother's Big Mouth on Channel 4 with Pete Burns, a Merseyside-born friend and performer for many years. At the end of 2007, it was reported in the Liverpool Echo that Clarke would be playing the role of Kath in a revival of the Joe Orton play Entertaining Mr Sloane, as part of the city's Capital of Culture celebrations for 2008.

On 11 January 2008, as part of the opening night celebrations of Liverpool's European Capital of Culture year, Clarke was one of around a hundred local celebrities hoisted hidden in a blue container by a crane 30 feet into the air, landing on the main stage at St. George's Hall in the city. The celebrities stepped out of the container marked "Precious Cargo" to rapturous applause. The same evening, Clarke appeared as a panel guest on the BBC Two late-night show Newsnight Review, talking about her hometown's Capital of Culture celebrations.

In January 2008, Clarke joined Liverpool's talk radio station City Talk 105.9, presenting a late-night show on Saturday evenings.

Clarke returned to a prime-time starring role in the second series of the British sitcom Benidorm on ITV in 2008 and reprised her role as Jackie Dobbs in Coronation Street on 2 January 2009, and again on 22 February 2010.

Also in February 2010, Clarke appeared with her daughter Rowan in an episode of the BBC's Celebrity Cash in the Attic.

Clarke appeared in Scousers in St Helens on 26 October 2010 alongside Tina Malone, Billy Butler and several others. In late 2010, she recorded numerous music tracks such as Like a Memory and Holographic Disco which are available on iTunes and in November 2010, she released her autobiography Margi Clarke – Now You See Me.

She appeared in an episode of the BBC drama series Waterloo Road in May 2011 and participated in Celebrity MasterChef in 2011. She also appeared in the Christmas edition of Come Dine With Me in December 2012.
