= Alan Halsall =

English actor

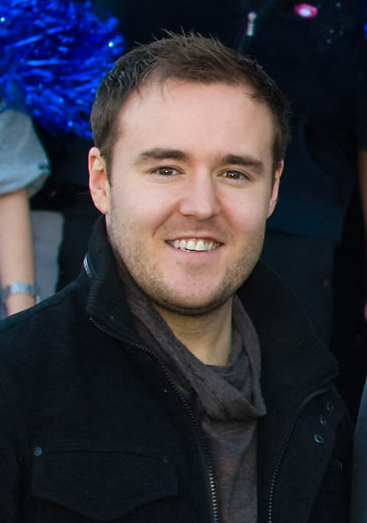
- Halsall in 2011
- Born: Alan David Halsall; 11 August 1982 (age 43); Walkden, Greater Manchester, England
- Occupation: Actor
- Years active: 1989–present
- Known for: Role of Tyrone Dobbs in Coronation Street (1998–)
- Spouse: Lucy-Jo Hudson (m. 2009; div. 2018)
- Children: 1

Alan David Halsall (born 11 August 1982) is an English actor, best known for playing Tyrone Dobbs in Coronation Street, a role he has played since 1998.

== Early life ==
Halsall was brought up in Walkden, Salford and attended Walkden High School.

== Career ==
Halsall has been in Coronation Street since November 1998, but had previously appeared in a variety of television shows including Children's Ward, Heartbeat, Hetty Wainthropp Investigates and Queer As Folk (1999). He also appeared in the CITV four-part series Matt's Million.

Halsall won the 2013 National Television Awards Outstanding Serial Drama Performance award for his role on Coronation Street.

In November 2024, Halsall appeared as a contestant on the twenty-fourth series of I'm a Celebrity...Get Me Out of Here! and was the seventh contestant to be eliminated, finishing in sixth place.

== Awards and nominations ==
Year	Nominated work	Award	Category	Result
2013	Coronation Street	National Television Awards	Outstanding Serial Drama Performance	Won
2013	Coronation Street	The British Soap Awards	Best Actor	Won
2013	Coronation Street	The British Soap Awards	Best On-Screen Partnership (with Jennie McAlpine)	Nominated

== Personal life ==
Halsall was married to former Coronation Street and Wild at Heart actress, Lucy-Jo Hudson. They met on set and began dating in 2005. They married on 13 June 2009 in Cheshire. On 18 February 2013, via Twitter, the couple announced they were expecting their first child, a baby girl. On 8 September 2013, Hudson gave birth to their daughter, 9 days after her due date, named Sienna-Rae. The couple announced they were splitting in March 2016, and they got back together after several weeks apart. In May 2018, they announced that they were divorcing.

On 10 November 2023, Coronation Street confirmed Halsall would be taking a short break from the show due to him needing an operation to repair a ligament in his knee. He is a vegetarian.
