= Vicky Binns =

English actress

- Born: Victoria Jane Binns; Bury, Greater Manchester, England
- Occupation: Actress
- Years active: 1998–present
- Notable work: Coronation Street Black Mirror, The Mill
- Television: Emmerdale (1999–2003); Coronation Street (2005–2010); The Mill (2013–2014); Black Mirror

Victoria Jane Binns is an English actress working in television and theatre, known for her long‑running roles in the ITV soap operas Emmerdale and Coronation Street. Her television work has also included lead roles in Nature Boy, Von Trapped, two series of The Mill, and guest appearances in Casualty and Moving On. In 2023, she appeared in the Netflix anthology series Black Mirror. On stage, Binns has appeared in over 20 productions, ranging from comedy to drama, and has frequently collaborated with director David Thacker.

== Career ==
Binns’s first major television role was in the ITV soap Emmerdale, playing Ollie Reynolds from 1999 to 2003. In 2004 she appeared alongside Caroline Quentin in the comedy‑drama Von Trapped, before joining Coronation Street as Molly Compton (later Dobbs) from 2005 to 2010.

She has also appeared in Nature Boy (alongside Lee Ingleby and Mark Benton) and was a guest lead in Casualty (BBC), True Crime (ITV), Moving On (BBC), and in both series of the period drama The Mill (Channel 4).

Binns has built a diverse theatre career, frequently collaborating with directors such as David Thacker. Her stage credits include Abigail's Party, Early Doors, Singing in the Rain (touring West End production as Lina Lamont), Faith Healer, I Have Been Here Before, Hatched and Dispatched, A Kind of Loving, Alfie, To Kill a Mocking Bird, The Winter's Tale, Shakespeare Celebratins, Home, I'm Darling, Beryl, Whose the Dummy, When the Lights Go On Again, That Can't Have Happened!, Yen, The Memory of Water and Taking the Piste.

She was praised for her roles in Who's The Dummy ("Vicky Binns plays the part of a ‘real’ dummy called Sunny so exquisitely and with such expert comic timing that it's a joy to behold.") and That Can't Have Happened! (described in the British Theatre Guide as "delivering such authenticity that the audience questioned whether they were telling their own stories or acting roles"). Her performance as Maggie in the 2025 production of Yen at the Octagon Theatre was described as "raw and unpredictable, capturing the character’s emotional complexity and holding the audience’s attention throughout." West end best friend noted that "all four cast members give strong performances ... particular stand‑out performances come ... from Vicky Binns as Maggie ... who demonstrates great range in her characterisation, showing Maggie’s vulnerability in contrasting yet naturalistic ways."

== Filmography ==
Year	Title	Type	Role	Notes
1998–1999	Children's Ward	TV	Tash	Series regular
1999–2003	Emmerdale	TV	Ollie Reynolds	Series regular, 241 episodes
2000	Nature Boy	TV	Anne-Marie	Credited as Victoria Binns
2004	Von Trapped	TV	Tammy-Jade	TV movie
2005–2010	Coronation Street	TV	Molly Dobbs	Series regular, 452 episodes
2011	Casualty	TV	Angela Simmons	1 episode: "Sanctuary"
2012	Crime Stories	TV	Cathy Foster	1 episode
2013–2014	The Mill	TV	Martha	Regular role
2016	Moving On	TV	Chris Howley	1 episode
2018	Doctors	TV	Sue MacKenzie	1 episode
2023	Black Mirror	TV	Julie	1 episode

== Stage ==
Year	Title	Role
2026	Taking the Piste	Patricia
2026	Memory of Water	Vi
2025	Yen	Maggie
2025	That Can't Have Happened	Em
2025	Faith Healer	Grace
2024	Who's The Dummy	Sunny
2024	When the Lights Go On Again	Betty
2021	Home, I'm Darling	Fran
2021	Early Doors	June
2019	Beryl	Beryl
2018	Abigail's Party	Angela
2016	I've Been Here Before	Sally
2016	To Kill a Mocking Bird	Maudie
2016	The Winter's Tale	Various
2016	Shakespeare Celebrations	Various
2015	Hatched and Dispatched	Maddy
2014	Singin' in the Rain	Lina Lamont
2013	A Kind of Loving	Ingrid
2011	Alfie	Annie/Carla
2005	Teechers	Gail
2005	Perfect Pitch	Steph
2004	Dave and Jeff	Bridie
