= List of awards and nominations received by Coronation Street =

Coronation Street is a British soap opera first broadcast on 9 December 1960. The show has earned various awards and nominations over the years for its cast performances and storylines.

== All About Soap Awards ==
The All About Soap Awards (formerly the All About Soap Bubble Awards) are presented by All About Soap magazine and voted for by the public. They started in 2002.

Year	Category	Nominee	Result	Ref.
2009	Bad Boy	Gray O'Brien (Tony Gordon)	Won	
2009	I'm A Survivor	Samia Ghadie (Maria Connor)	Won	
2010	Baby Drama	Maria gives birth in a deserted shack	Nominated	
2010	Bride and Doom	John & Fiz Stape (Graeme Hawley & Jennie McAlpine)	Nominated	
2010	Bride and Doom	Steve & Becky McDonald (Simon Gregson & Katherine Kelly)	Won	
2010	Fatal Attraction	Michael Le Vell & Vicky Binns (Kevin Webster and Molly Dobbs)	Nominated	
2010	Femme Fatale	Alison King (Carla Connor)	Nominated	
2010	Femme Fatale	Helen Flanagan (Rosie Webster)	Nominated	
2010	Killer Secret	Carla returns to blackmail Tony	Nominated	
2010	Smooth Criminal	Gray O'Brien (Tony Gordon)	Won	
2011	Best Actor	Chris Gascoyne (Peter Barlow)	Nominated	
2011	Best Actress	Katherine Kelly (Becky McDonald)	Nominated	
2011	Best Baby Drama	Tyrone learns the truth about Jack	Nominated	
2011	Best Comeback	Kate Ford (Tracy Barlow)	Nominated	
2011	Best Love Triangle	Leanne, Peter, Nick	Nominated	
2011	Best Newcomer	Paula Lane (Kylie Platt)	Nominated	
2011	Best Stunt	Tram Crash	Won	
2012	Best Actor	Chris Gascoyne (Peter Barlow)	Nominated	
2012	Best Actress	Alison King (Carla Connor)	Nominated	
2012	Best Comeback	Graeme Hawley (John Stape)	Nominated	
2012	Best Couple	Chris Gascoyne & Alison King (Peter Barlow & Carla Connor)	Nominated	
2012	Best Episode	Steve and Tracy's wedding	Nominated	
2012	Best Villain	Andrew Lancel (Frank Foster)	Nominated	
2013	Best Baby Drama	Kylie's pregnancy – who's the daddy?	Nominated	
2013	Best Baby Drama	Tina's surrogacy	Nominated	
2013	Best Episode	Kirsty falls down the stairs after she confronts Tyrone	Nominated	
2013	Best Storyline	Nick and Leanne's rocky romance	Nominated	
2013	Best Wedding	Alan Halsall & Natalie Gumede (Tyrone Dobbs & Kirsty Soames)	Won	
2013	Best Wedding	Ben Price & Jane Danson (Nick Tilsley & Leanne Barlow)	Nominated	
2013	Forbidden Lovers	Charlie Condou & Samia Ghadie (Marcus Dent & Maria Connor)	Nominated	

== British Academy Television Awards ==
The British Academy Television Awards were launched in 1954 and are presented during an annual award show hosted by the British Academy of Film and Television Arts.

Year	Category	Nominee	Result	Ref
1987	Best Actress	Jean Alexander (Hilda Ogden)	Nominated	
1992	Best Drama Serial	Coronation Street	Nominated	
1995	Best Drama Serial	Coronation Street	Nominated	
1997	Lew Grade Award	Coronation Street	Won	
1999	Best Soap Opera	Coronation Street	Nominated	
2000	Best Soap Opera	Coronation Street	Nominated	
2001	Best Soap Opera	Coronation Street	Nominated	
2001	Special Award	Coronation Street	Won	
2002	Best Soap Opera	Coronation Street	Nominated	
2003	Best Continuing Drama	Coronation Street	Won	
2003	Lew Grade Award	Coronation Street	Nominated	
2004	Best Continuing Drama	Coronation Street	Won	
2005	Best Continuing Drama	Coronation Street	Won	
2006	Best Continuing Drama	Coronation Street	Nominated	
2007	Best Continuing Drama	Coronation Street	Nominated	
2009	Philips Audience Award	Coronation Street	Nominated	
2010	Best Continuing Drama	Coronation Street	Nominated	
2011	Best Continuing Drama	Coronation Street	Nominated	
2012	Best Continuing Drama	Coronation Street	Won	
2013	Best Continuing Drama	Coronation Street	Nominated	
2014	Best Continuing Drama	Coronation Street	Won	
2015	Best Continuing Drama	Coronation Street	Won	
2016	Best Continuing Drama	Coronation Street	Nominated	
2018	Best Continuing Drama	Coronation Street	Nominated	
2020	Virgin Media’s Must-See Moment	The death of Sinead Osbourne	Nominated	
2020	Best Soap and Continuing Drama	Coronation Street	Nominated	
2021	Best Soap and Continuing Drama	Coronation Street	Nominated	
2022	Best Soap and Continuing Drama	Coronation Street	Won	
2025	Best Soap	Coronation Street	Nominated	
2026	Best Soap	Coronation Street	Nominated	

== The British Soap Awards ==
The British Soap Awards begun in 1999. Since beginning in 1999, Coronation Street has won 111 awards, the most out of all soaps.

Year	Category	Nominee	Result	Ref
1999	Best British Soap	Coronation Street	Won	
1999	Villain of the Year	Stephen Billington (Greg Kelly)	Won	
1999	Best On-screen Partnership	David Neilson & Julie Hesmondhalgh (Roy & Hayley Cropper)	Won	
1999	Best Comedy Performance	John Savident (Fred Elliott)	Won	
1999	Special Achievement	William Roache (Ken Barlow)	Won	
2000	Best British Soap	Coronation Street	Nominated	
2000	Best Comedy Performance	Sue Nicholls (Audrey Roberts)	Won	
2000	Best Storyline	Sarah's Teenage Pregnancy	Won	
2000	Special Achievement	Tony Warren (creator)	Won	
2001	Best Dramatic Performance	Georgia Taylor (Toyah Battersby)	Won	
2001	Best Exit	Naomi Radcliffe (Alison Webster)	Won	
2001	Best On-Screen Partnership	Bill Tarmey and Liz Dawn (Jack and Vera Duckworth)	Won	
2001	Best Single Episode	Coronation Street Live	Won	
2001	Best British Soap	Coronation Street	Nominated	
2001	Best Storyline	Mark, Linda and Mike love triangle	Won	
2002	Best British Soap	Coronation Street	Nominated	
2002	Best Comedy Performance	Malcolm Hebden (Norris Cole)	Won	
2003	Best British Soap	Coronation Street	Won	
2003	Best Actor	Brian Capron (Richard Hillman)	Won	
2003	Villain of the Year	Brian Capron (Richard Hillman)	Won	
2003	Best Exit	Brian Capron (Richard Hillman)	Won	
2003	Best Comedy Performance	Andrew Whyment (Kirk Sutherland)	Won	
2003	Best Dramatic Performance	Sue Nicholls (Audrey Roberts)	Won	
2003	Spectacular Scene of the Year	The demise of Richard Hillman	Won	
2003	Best Storyline	Richard Hillman's Reign of Terror	Won	
2004	Best British Soap	Coronation Street	Nominated	
2004	Best On-screen partnership	David Neilson & Julie Hesmondhalgh (Roy & Hayley Cropper)	Won	
2004	Best Storyline	Tracy wreaks havock	Won	
2004	Lifetime Achievement	Barbara Knox (Rita Sullivan)	Won	
2005	Best British Soap	Coronation Street	Won	
2005	Best Actress	Suranne Jones (Karen McDonald)	Won	
2005	Villain of the Year	Sasha Behar (Maya Sharma)	Won	
2005	Best Comedy Performance	Maggie Jones (Blanche Hunt)	Won	
2005	Best Young Performance	Sam Aston (Chesney Brown)	Won	
2005	Spectacular Scene of the Year	Maya's revenge	Won	
2005	Special Achievement	John Stevenston (writer)	Won	
2006	Best British Soap	Coronation Street	Nominated	
2006	Sexiest Male	Richard Fleeshman	Won	
2006	Best On-screen Partnership	Malcolm Hebden & Barbara Knox (Norris Cole & Rita Sullivan)	Won	
2006	Best Dramatic Performance	Bradley Walsh (Danny Baldwin)	Won	
2006	Special Achievement	Tony Prescott (Director at Coronation Street & Emmerdale)	Won	
2006	Lifetime Achievement	Johnny Briggs (Mike Baldwin)	Won	
2007	Best British Soap	Coronation Street	Won	
2007	Best Storyline	Charlie's cheating & Tracy's revenge	Won	
2007	Best Exit	Bill Ward (Charlie Stubbs)	Won	
2007	Best Newcomer	Kym Ryder (Michelle Connor)	Won	
2007	Sexiest Male	Rob James-Collier (Liam Connor)	Won	
2007	Best Actor	Antony Cotton (Sean Tully)	Won	
2007	Best Actress	Kate Ford (Tracy Barlow)	Won	
2008	Best British Soap	Coronation Street	Nominated	
2008	Sexiest Male	Rob James-Collier (Liam Connor)	Won	
2008	Villain of the Year	Jack P. Shepherd (David Platt)	Won	
2008	Best Newcomer	Michelle Keegan (Tina McIntyre)	Won	
2008	Best Comedy Performance	Maggie Jones (Blanche Hunt)	Won	
2008	Lifetime Achievement	Liz Dawn (Vera Duckworth)	Won	
2009	Best British Soap	Coronation Street	Nominated	
2009	Best Actress	Katherine Kelly (Becky McDonald)	Won	
2009	Sexiest Female	Michelle Keegan (Tina McIntyre)	Won	
2009	Villain of the Year	Gray O'Brien (Tony Gordon)	Won	
2009	Best Newcomer	Craig Gazey (Graeme Proctor)	Won	
2009	Best Exit	Rob James-Collier (Liam Connor)	Won	
2009	Special Achievement	Peter Whalley (writer)	Won	
2010	Best British Soap	Coronation Street	Nominated	
2010	Sexiest Female	Michelle Keegan (Tina McIntyre)	Won	
2010	Best Comedy Performance	Craig Gazey (Graeme Proctor)	Won	
2010	Lifetime Achievement	Betty Driver (Betty Williams)	Won	
2011	Best Actor	Chris Gascoyne (Peter Barlow)	Nominated	
2011	Best Actress	Katherine Kelly (Becky McDonald)	Nominated	
2011	Best British Soap	Coronation Street	Nominated	
2011	Best Comedy Performance	Patti Clare (Mary Taylor)	Nominated	
2011	Best Dramatic Performance	Jane Danson (Leanne Battersby)	Won	
2011	Best Exit	Bill Tarmey (Jack Duckworth)	Won	
2011	Best Newcomer	Paula Lane (Kylie Platt)	Nominated	
2011	Best On-Screen Partnership	Katherine Kelly & Simon Gregson (Becky & Steve McDonald)	Nominated	
2011	Best Single Episode	"Coronation Street Live"	Won	
2011	Best Storyline	End of the line for the Websters and Dobbs	Won	
2011	Best Young Performance	Alex Bain (Simon Barlow)	Won	
2011	Lifetime Achievement Award	Bill Tarmey (Jack Duckworth)	Won	
2011	Spectacular Scene of the Year	The Tram Crash	Won	
2011	Villain of the Year	Kate Ford (Tracy Barlow)	Nominated	
2012	Best Actor	Chris Gascoyne (Peter Barlow	Nominated	
2012	Best Actress	Alison King (Carla Connor)	Won	
2012	Best Dramatic Performance	Alison King (Carla Connor)	Nominated	
2012	Best British Soap	Coronation Street	Nominated	
2012	Best Comedy Performance	Stephanie Cole (Sylvia Goodwin)	Won	
2012	Best Exit	Katherine Kelly	Won	
2012	Best Newcomer	Natalie Gumede (Kirsty Soames)	Won	
2012	Best Single Episode	Becky's Final Farewell	Won	
2012	Best Storyline	Carla's rape ordeal	Nominated	
2012	Best Young Performance	Alex Bain (Simon Barlow)	Nominated	
2012	Spectacular Scene of the Year	Carla's car crash	Nominated	
2012	Villain of the Year	Andrew Lancel (Frank Foster)	Won	
2013	Best Actor	Alan Halsall (Tyrone Dobbs)	Won	
2013	Best Actress	Jennie McAlpine (Fiz Stape)	Nominated	
2013	Best Actress	Michelle Keegan (Tina McIntyre)	Nominated	
2013	Best British Soap	Coronation Street	Won	
2013	Best Comedy Performance	Patti Clare (Mary Taylor)	Won	
2013	Best Exit	Nigel Havers (Lewis Archer)	Won	
2013	Best Newcomer	Marc Baylis (Rob Donovan)	Nominated	
2013	Best On-Screen Partnership	Jennie McAlpine & Alan Halsall (Fiz Stape & Tyrone Dobbs)	Nominated	
2013	Best Single Episode	Kirsty's treachery ends in Tyrone's arrest	Nominated	
2013	Best Storyline	Kirsty's abuse of Tyrone	Won	
2013	Best Young Performance	Ellie Leach (Faye Windass)	Nominated	
2013	Spectacular Scene of the Year	The Rovers fire	Nominated	
2013	Best Dramatic Performance	Natalie Gumede (Kirsty Soames)	Won	
2013	Villain of the Year	Natalie Gumede (Kirsty Soames)	Won	
2013	Villain of the Year	Nigel Havers (Lewis Archer)	Nominated	
2014	Best British Soap	Coronation Street	Nominated	
2014	Best Actor	David Neilson (Roy Cropper)	Won	
2014	Best Dramatic Performance	David Neilson (Roy Cropper)	Won	
2014	Best Actress	Julie Hesmondhalgh (Hayley Cropper)	Won	
2014	Best British Soap	Coronation Street	Nominated	
2014	Best Comedy Performance	Simon Gregson (Steve McDonald)	Won	
2014	Best Newcomer	Amy James-Kelly (Maddie Heath)	Nominated	
2014	Best On-Screen Partnership	David Neilson & Julie Hesmondhalgh (Roy & Hayley Cropper)	Won	
2014	Best Single Episode	Hayley's Death	Won	
2014	Best Storyline	Hayley's cancer battle	Won	
2014	Villain of the Year	Chris Gascoyne (Peter Barlow)	Shortlisted	
2014	Villain of the Year	Connor McIntyre (Pat Phelan)	Shortlisted	
2014	Villain of the Year	Jack P. Shepherd (David Platt)	Shortlisted	
2014	Best Young Performance	Alex Bain (Simon Barlow)	Nominated	
2014	Spectacular Scene of the Year	Nick and David's car crash	Nominated	
2014	Outstanding Achievement Award	Helen Worth (Gail McIntyre)	Won	
2015	Best British Soap	Coronation Street	Nominated	
2015	Best Actor	David Neilson (Roy Cropper)	Nominated	
2015	Best Actor	Simon Gregson (Steve McDonald)	Nominated	
2015	Best Dramatic Performance	Simon Gregson (Steve McDonald)	Nominated	
2015	Best Actress	Alison King (Carla Connor)	Nominated	
2015	Best Comedy Performance	Sally Dynevor (Sally Webster)	Won	
2015	Best Newcomer	Sean Ward (Callum Logan)	Nominated	
2015	Best On-Screen Partnership	Joe Duttine & Sally Dynevor (Tim & Sally Metcalfe)	Nominated	
2015	Best Single Episode	Rob's Confession	Nominated	
2015	Best Storyline	Steve and Michelle – "Hearts and Minds"	Nominated	
2015	Best Young Performance	Ellie Leach (Faye Windass)	Nominated	
2015	Scene of the Year	Deirdre throws the trifle	Nominated	
2015	Outstanding Achievement	Anne Kirkbride (Deirdre Barlow)	Won	
2015	Villain of the Year	Sean Ward (Callum Logan)	Nominated	
2016	Best Actor	Jack P. Shepherd (David Platt	Nominated	
2016	Best Male Dramatic Performance	Jack P. Shepherd (David Platt	Nominated	
2016	Best Actress	Alison King (Carla Connor)	Nominated	
2016	Best British Soap	Coronation Street	Nominated	
2016	Best Comedy Performance	Patti Clare (Mary Taylor	Won	
2016	Best Female Dramatic Performance	Tina O'Brien (Sarah Platt)	Nominated	
2016	Best Newcomer	Shayne Ward (Aidan Connor)	Nominated	
2016	Best On-Screen Partnership	Joe Duttine & Sally Dynevor (Tim & Sally Metcalfe)	Won	
2016	Best Single Episode	The Live Episode	Nominated	
2016	Best Storyline	Callum's Reign of Terror & Sarah's baby	Nominated	
2016	Best Young Performance	Elle Mulvaney (Amy Barlow)	Nominated	
2016	Scene of the Year	Callum's Death	Nominated	
2016	Tony Warren Award	James Bain (Casting Director at Coronation Street & Emmerdale)	Won	
2016	Villain of The Year	Connor McIntyre (Pat Phelan)	Won	
2017	Best British Soap	Coronation Street	Nominated	
2017	Best Actor	Jack P. Shepherd (David Platt)	Shortlisted	
2017	Best Actress	Lucy Fallon (Bethany Platt)	Shortlisted	
2017	Best Actress	Kym Marsh (Michelle Connor)	Shortlisted	
2017	Best Female Dramatic Performance	Kym Marsh (Michelle Connor)	Won	
2017	Best Male Dramatic Performance	Simon Gregson (Steve McDonald)	Nominated	
2017	Best Comedy Performance	Dolly-Rose Campbell (Gemma Winter)	Won	
2017	Best Young Actor	Elle Mulvaney (Amy Barlow)	Won	
2017	Villain of the Year	Connor McIntyre (Pat Phelan)	Nominated	
2017	Best Newcomer	Rob Mallard (Daniel Osbourne)	Won	
2017	Best On-Screen Partnership	Malcolm Hebden & Patti Clare (Norris Cole & Mary Taylor)	Nominated	
2017	Best Single Episode	Kylie's Death	Nominated	
2017	Scene of the Year	Michelle's Goodbye to Ruairi	Nominated	
2017	Best Storyline	The Grooming of Bethany	Nominated	
2018	Best British Soap	Coronation Street	Won	
2018	Best Actor	Jack P. Shepherd (David Platt)	Won	
2018	Best Actor	Connor McIntyre (Pat Phelan)	Nominated	
2018	Best Actress	Lucy Fallon (Bethany Platt)	Won	
2018	Best Actress	Catherine Tyldesley (Eva Price)	Nominated	
2018	Greatest Moment	Richard Hillman Drives the Platts into the Canal	Nominated	
2018	Villain of the Year	Connor McIntyre (Pat Phelan)	Won	
2018	Best Male Dramatic Performance	Connor McIntyre (Pat Phelan)	Nominated	
2018	Best Female Dramatic Performance	Lucy Fallon (Bethany Platt)	Won	
2018	Best Comedy Performance	Louiza Patikas (Moira Pollock)	Nominated	
2018	Best Young Actor	Matilda Freeman (Summer Spellman)	Nominated	
2018	Scene of the Year	The Grooming of Bethany	Nominated	
2018	Best On-screen Partnership	Bhavna Limbachia & Faye Brookes (Rana Nazir & Kate Connor)	Nominated	
2018	Best Newcomer	Nicola Thorp (Nicola Rubinstein)	Nominated	
2018	Best Storyline	Phelan's Reign of Terror	Nominated	
2018	Best Single Episode	Aidan and Eva's Wedding Debacle	Nominated	
2018	Tony Warren Award	Kieran Roberts (executive producer)	Won	
2019	Best British Soap	Coronation Street	Nominated	
2019	Best Actor	Jack P. Shepherd (David Platt)	Nominated	
2019	Best Actress	Alison King (Carla Connor)	Nominated	
2019	Villain of the Year	Greg Wood (Rick Neelan)	Nominated	
2019	Best Male Dramatic Performance	Rob Mallard (Daniel Osbourne)	Nominated	
2019	Best Female Dramatic Performance	Katie McGlynn (Sinead Tinker)	Nominated	
2019	Best Comedy Performance	Patti Clare (Mary Cole)	Nominated	
2019	Best Young Actor	Elle Mulvaney (Amy Barlow)	Nominated	
2019	Scene of the Year	Gail's Monologue	Won	
2019	Best On-Screen Partnership	Simon Gregson & Kate Ford (Steve & Tracy McDonald)	Nominated	
2019	Best Newcomer	Alexandra Mardell (Emma Brooker)	Won	
2019	Best Storyline	The impact of Aidan's suicide	Won	
2019	Best Single Episode	Aidan's suicide and the aftermath	Won	
2019	Outstanding Achievement Award	Sue Nicholls (Audrey Roberts)	Won	
2022	Best British Soap	Coronation Street	Nominated	
2022	Best Leading Performer	Sally Carman (Abi Webster)	Nominated	
2022	Villain of the Year	Maximus Evans (Corey Brent)	Won	
2022	Best Family	The Alahans	Nominated	
2022	Best Dramatic Performance	Sally Carman (Abi Webster)	Nominated	
2022	Best Comedy Performance	Jane Hazlegrove (Bernie Winter)	Nominated	
2022	Best Young Performer	Millie Gibson (Kelly Neelan)	Won	
2022	Scene of the Year	Johnny's Death	Nominated	
2022	Best On-Screen Partnership	David Neilson & Mollie Gallagher (Roy Cropper & Nina Lucas)	Nominated	
2022	Best Newcomer	Paddy Bever (Max Turner)	Nominated	
2022	Best Storyline	Hate Crime	Nominated	
2022	Best Single Episode	"Flashback"	Nominated	
2022	Tony Warren Award	Jan McVerry (writer)	Won	
2023	Best British Soap	Coronation Street	Nominated	
2023	Best Leading Performer	Charlotte Jordan (Daisy Midgeley)	Nominated	
2023	Villain of the Year	Todd Boyce (Stephen Reid)	Nominated	
2023	Best Family	The Platts	Won	
2023	Best Dramatic Performance	Charlotte Jordan (Daisy Midgeley)	Won	
2023	Best Comedy Performance	Maureen Lipman (Evelyn Plummer)	Won	
2023	Best Young Performer	Jude Riordan (Sam Blakeman)	Nominated	
2023	Scene of the Year	Acid Attack	Won	
2023	Best On-Screen Partnership	David Neilson and Maureen Lipman (Roy Cropper and Evelyn Plummer)	Nominated	
2023	Best Newcomer	Channique Sterling-Brown (Dee Dee Bailey)	Won	
2023	Best Storyline	Daisy's Stalking Hell	Nominated	
2023	Best Single Episode	Acid Attack	Won	

== Inside Soap Awards ==
The Inside Soap Awards are voted for by readers of Inside Soap magazine. The awards have been running since 1996.

Year	Category	Nominee	Result	Ref
2010	Best Actor	Chris Gascoyne (Peter Barlow)	Nominated	
2010	Best Actor	Simon Gregson (Steve McDonald)	Nominated	
2010	Best Actor	Gray O'Brien (Tony Gordon)	Nominated	
2010	Best Actress	Sally Dynevor (Sally Webster)	Nominated	
2010	Best Actress	Katherine Kelly (Becky McDonald)	Nominated	
2010	Best Actress	Alison King (Carla Connor)	Nominated	
2010	Best Dramatic Performance	Alison King (Carla Connor)	Nominated	
2010	Best Dramatic Performance	Helen Worth (Gail McIntyre)	Nominated	
2010	Best Exit	Gray O'Brien (Tony Gordon)	Nominated	
2010	Best Exit	Reece Dinsdale (Joe McIntyre)	Nominated	
2010	Best Newcomer	Cherylee Houston (Izzy Armstrong)	Nominated	
2010	Best Newcomer	Holly Quin-Ankrah (Cheryl Gray)	Nominated	
2010	Best Soap	Coronation Street	Nominated	
2010	Best Stunt	The factory explosion	Won	
2010	Best Stunt	Joe perishes on the lake	Nominated	
2010	Best Wedding	Steve & Becky McDonald (Simon Gregson & Katherine Kelly)	Nominated	
2010	Best Wedding	John & Fiz Stape (Graeme Hawley & Jennie McAlpine)	Nominated	
2010	Best Young Actor	Alex Bain (Simon Barlow)	Won	
2010	Best Young Actor	Elle Mulvaney (Amy Barlow)	Nominated	
2010	Funniest Performance	Patti Clare (Mary Taylor)	Nominated	
2010	Funniest Performance	Craig Gazey (Graeme Proctor)	Won	
2011	Best Actor	Chris Gascoyne (Peter Barlow)	Nominated	
2011	Best Actress	Katherine Kelly (Becky McDonald)	Nominated	
2011	Best Bad Boy	Chris Gascoyne (Peter Barlow)	Nominated	
2011	Best Dramatic Performance	Jane Danson (Leanne Battersby)	Nominated	
2011	Best Exit	Bill Tarmey (Jack Duckworth)	Won	
2011	Best Newcomer	Paula Lane (Kylie Platt)	Nominated	
2011	Best Soap	Coronation Street	Nominated	
2011	Best Wedding	David Neilson & Julie Hesmondhalgh (Roy & Hayley Cropper)	Nominated	
2011	Best Young Actor	Alex Bain (Simon Barlow)	Nominated	
2011	Funniest Performance	Patti Clare (Mary Taylor)	Nominated	
2011	Outstanding Achievement	Coronation Street	Won	
2012	Best Actor	Chris Gascoyne (Peter Barlow)	Nominated	
2012	Best Actress	Michelle Keegan (Tina McIntyre)	Nominated	
2012	Best Bad Boy	Chris Gascoyne (Peter Barlow)	Nominated	
2012	Best Bitch	Kate Ford (Tracy Barlow)	Nominated	
2012	Best Bitch	Paula Lane (Kylie Platt)	Nominated	
2012	Best Newcomer	Natalie Gumede (Kirsty Soames)	Nominated	
2012	Best Soap	Coronation Street	Nominated	
2012	Best Young Actor	Alex Bain (Simon Barlow)	Won	
2012	Funniest Male	Simon Gregson (Steve McDonald)	Nominated	
2012	Funniest Female	Katy Cavanagh (Julie Carp)	Nominated	

== National Television Awards ==
Year	Category	Nominee	Result	Ref
1995	Most Popular Serial Drama	Coronation Street	Won	
1995	Special Recognition Award	Julie Goodyear (Bet Lynch)	Won	
1996	Most Popular Serial Drama	Coronation Street	Nominated	
1997	Most Popular Newcomer	Matthew Marsden (Chris Collins)	Won	
1997	Most Popular Serial Drama	Coronation Street	Nominated	
1998	Most Popular Newcomer	Jane Danson (Leanne Battersby)	Nominated	
1998	Most Popular Newcomer	Adam Rickitt (Nick Tilsley)	Nominated	
1998	Most Popular Serial Drama	Coronation Street	Won	
1999	Most Popular Actor	Steven Arnold (Ashley Peacock)	Nominated	
1999	Most Popular Actress	Julie Hesmondhalgh (Hayley Cropper)	Nominated	
1999	Most Popular Newcomer	Alan Halsall (Tyrone Dobbs)	Nominated	
1999	Most Popular Newcomer	Naomi Radcliffe (Alison Wakefield)	Nominated	
1999	Most Popular Serial Drama	Coronation Street	Won	
2000	Most Popular Newcomer	Tina O'Brien (Sarah-Louise Platt)	Won	
2000	Most Popular Serial Drama	Coronation Street	Won	
2001	Most Popular Actress	Georgia Taylor (Toyah Battersby)	Nominated	
2001	Most Popular Newcomer	Scott Wright (Sam Kingston)	Nominated	
2001	Most Popular Serial Drama	Coronation Street	Nominated	
2002	Most Popular Newcomer	Brian Capron (Richard Hillman)	Nominated	
2002	Most Popular Serial Drama	Coronation Street	Nominated	
2003	Most Popular Actor	Brian Capron (Richard Hillman)	Nominated	
2003	Most Popular Actress	Suranne Jones (Karen McDonald)	Nominated	
2003	Most Popular Newcomer	Kate Ford (Tracy Barlow)	Nominated	
2003	Most Popular Serial Drama	Coronation Street	Nominated	
2004	Most Popular Actor	Bruno Langley (Todd Grimshaw)	Nominated	
2004	Most Popular Actress	Suranne Jones (Karen McDonald)	Won	
2004	Most Popular Actress	Tina O'Brien (Sarah-Louise Platt)	Nominated	
2004	Most Popular Newcomer	Sam Aston (Chesney Battersby-Brown)	Won	
2004	Most Popular Serial Drama	Coronation Street	Won	
2005	Most Popular Actor	Bradley Walsh (Danny Baldwin)	Nominated	
2005	Most Popular Actress	Sally Lindsay (Shelley Unwin)	Nominated	
2005	Most Popular Newcomer	Antony Cotton (Sean Tully)	Won	
2005	Most Popular Serial Drama	Coronation Street	Nominated	
2006	Most Popular Actor	Bradley Walsh (Danny Baldwin)	Nominated	
2006	Most Popular Actress	Sue Cleaver (Eileen Grimshaw)	Nominated	
2006	Most Popular Newcomer	Nikki Patel (Amber Kalirai)	Nominated	
2006	Most Popular Serial Drama	Coronation Street	Nominated	
2007	Most Popular Actor	Antony Cotton (Sean Tully)	Nominated	
2007	Most Popular Actress	Sue Cleaver (Eileen Grimshaw)	Nominated	
2007	Most Popular Serial Drama	Coronation Street	Nominated	
2008	Most Popular Serial Drama	Coronation Street	Nominated	
2008	Outstanding Serial Drama Performance	Katherine Kelly (Becky Granger)	Nominated	
2010	Most Popular Newcomer	Craig Gazey (Graeme Proctor)	Won	
2010	Most Popular Serial Drama	Coronation Street	Won	
2010	Outstanding Serial Drama Performance	Katherine Kelly (Becky McDonald)	Nominated	
2010	Outstanding Serial Drama Performance	Simon Gregson (Steve McDonald)	Nominated	
2010	Outstanding Serial Drama Performance	Gray O'Brien (Tony Gordon)	Nominated	
2011	Most Popular Serial Drama	Coronation Street	Nominated	
2011	Outstanding Serial Drama Performance	Katherine Kelly (Becky McDonald)	Nominated	
2012	Most Popular Serial Drama	Coronation Street	Won	
2012	Outstanding Serial Drama Performance	Katherine Kelly (Becky McDonald)	Won	
2012	Outstanding Serial Drama Performance	Alison King (Carla Connor)	Nominated	
2013	Most Popular Newcomer	Natalie Gumede (Kirsty Soames)	Nominated	
2013	Most Popular Serial Drama	Coronation Street	Won	
2013	Outstanding Serial Drama Performance	Alan Halsall (Tyrone Dobbs)	Won	
2013	Outstanding Serial Drama Performance	Michelle Keegan (Tina McIntyre)	Nominated	
2014	Most Popular Newcomer	Marc Baylis (Rob Donovan)	Nominated	
2014	Most Popular Serial Drama	Coronation Street	Won	
2014	Outstanding Serial Drama Performance	Julie Hesmondhalgh (Hayley Cropper)	Won	
2014	Outstanding Serial Drama Performance	Michelle Keegan (Tina McIntyre)	Nominated	
2014	Outstanding Serial Drama Performance	David Neilson (Roy Cropper)	Nominated	
2015	Serial Drama	Coronation Street	Nominated	
2016	Serial Drama	Coronation Street	Nominated	
2016	Serial Drama Performance	Alison King (Carla Connor)	Nominated	
2016	Newcomer	Shayne Ward (Aidan Connor)	Won	
2017	Serial Drama	Coronation Street	Nominated	
2017	Serial Drama Performance	Jack P. Shepherd (David Platt)	Nominated	
2017	Newcomer	Faye Brookes (Kate Connor)	Won	
2018	Serial Drama	Coronation Street	Nominated	
2018	Newcomer	Rob Mallard (Daniel Osbourne)	Nominated	
2018	Serial Drama Performance	Lucy Fallon (Bethany Platt)	Won	
2018	Serial Drama Performance	Barbara Knox (Rita Tanner)	Nominated	
2019	Serial Drama	Coronation Street	Nominated	
2019	Serial Drama Performance	Jack P. Shepherd (David Platt)	Nominated	
2019	Newcomer	Alexandra Mardell (Emma Brooker)	Nominated	
2020	Serial Drama	Coronation Street	Nominated	
2020	Serial Drama Performance,	Katie McGlynn (Sinead Tinker)	Won	
2020	Newcomer	Peter Ash (Paul Foreman)	Won	
2021	Serial Drama	Coronation Street	Won	
2021	Serial Drama Performance	Mollie Gallagher (Nina Lucas)	Won	
2021	Serial Drama Performance	Sally Carman (Abi Franklin)	Nominated	
2021	Newcomer	Jude Riordan (Sam Blakeman)	Won	
2022	Serial Drama	Coronation Street	Nominated	
2022	Rising Star	Paddy Bever (Max Turner)	Won	
2023	Serial Drama	Coronation Street	Nominated	
2023	Serial Drama Performance	Charlotte Jordan (Daisy Midgeley)	Nominated	
2023	Serial Drama Performance	Maureen Lipman (Evelyn Plummer)	Nominated	
2023	Rising Star	Channique Sterling-Brown (Dee-Dee Bailey)	Nominated	
2024	Serial Drama	Coronation Street	Nominated	
2024	Serial Drama Performance	Peter Ash (Paul Foreman)	Won	
2024	Serial Drama Performance	David Neilson (Roy Cropper)	Nominated	

== Royal Television Society Awards ==
=== Programme Awards ===
The Royal Television Society Awards ceremony takes place every March in central London.

Year	Category	Nominee	Result	Ref
2003	Soap	Coronation Street	Won	
2004	Soap	Coronation Street	Won	
2005	Soap	Coronation Street	Nominated	
2006	Soap	Coronation Street	Nominated	
2007	Best Soap and Continuing Drama	Coronation Street	Won	
2008	Best Soap and Continuing Drama	Coronation Street	Nominated	
2009	Best Soap and Continuing Drama	Coronation Street	Nominated	
2010	Best Soap and Continuing Drama	Coronation Street	Nominated	
2011	Best Soap and Continuing Drama	Coronation Street	Nominated	
2012	Best Soap and Continuing Drama	Coronation Street	Won	
2013	Best Soap and Continuing Drama	Coronation Street	Won	
2021	Soap and Continuing Drama	Coronation Street	Nominated	

=== Craft & Design Awards ===
The Royal Television Society Craft & Design Awards are presented to recognize technical achievements in British television. The live episode received three nominations in 2011.

Year	Category	Nominee	Result	Ref
2010	Judges' Award	Coronation Street	Won	
2011	Effects - Special	Danny Hargreaves	Nominated	
2011	Lighting for Multicamera	Chris Chisnall & The Lighting Team	Won	
2011	Sound - Drama	Alan Monks & The Sound Team	Nominated	
2015	Lighting for Multicamera	Lighting Team	Nominated	
2016	Lighting for Multicamera	Lighting Team	Nominated	
2016	Multicamera Work	Camera Team	Won	

=== North West Awards ===
The Royal Television Society North West Awards are presented to recognize regional achievements in British television.

Year	Category	Nominee	Result	Ref
2022	Best Performance in A Continuing Drama	Sally Carman	Won	
2022	Best Performance in A Continuing Drama	Georgia Taylor	Nominated	
2022	Best Continuing Drama Storyline	Abi's baby battle	Won	
2022	Best Continuing Drama Storyline	Justice for Seb	Nominated	
2020 –21	Best Performance in A Continuing Drama	Sally Carman	Won	
2020 –21	Best Performance in A Continuing Drama	Mollie Gallagher	Nominated	
2020 –21	Best Continuing Drama Storyline	Coercive control	Nominated	
2020 –21	Best Continuing Drama Storyline	Seb and Nina'a attack	Nominated	
2019	Best Performance in A Continuing Drama	Rob Mallard	Won	
2019	Best Performance in A Continuing Drama	Katie McGlynn	Nominated	
2019	Best Continuing Drama Storyline	Sinead's cancer	Won	
2019	Best Continuing Drama Storyline	Carla's psychosis	Nominated	
2018	Best Performance in A Continuing Drama	Jack P. Shepherd	Won	
2018	Best Continuing Drama Storyline	David Platt's ordeal	Won	
2017	Best Performance in A Continuing Drama	Kym Marsh	Won	
2017	Best Performance in A Continuing Drama	Lucy Fallon	Nominated	
2017	Best Continuing Drama Storyline	Michelle's ordeal	Won	
2017	Best Continuing Drama Storyline	Bethany's ordeal	Nominated	
2016	Best Performance in A Continuing Drama	Tina O'Brien	Won	
2016	Best Performance in A Continuing Drama	Jack P Shepherd	Nominated	
2015	Best Performance in A Continuing Drama	Sally Dynevor	Nominated	
2015	Best Performance in A Continuing Drama	Simon Gregson	Won	
2015	Best Continuing Drama Storyline	Steve's Depression	Won	
2015	Best Continuing Drama Storyline	Faye's ordeal	Nominated	
2014	Best Performance in A Continuing Drama	Alison King	Won	
2014	Best Performance in A Continuing Drama	David Neilson	Nominated	
2014	Innovation in Multiplatform	Who Kills Tina (ITV)	Nominated	
2014	Best Script Writer	Jan McVerry	Nominated	
2014	Best Continuing Drama Storyline	Hayley's cancer	Won	
2014	Best Continuing Drama Storyline	Anna's ultimate sacrifice	Nominated	
2014	Best Continuing Drama Storyline	Tina's untimely death	Nominated	
2013	Best Performance in A Continuing Drama	Julie Hesmondhalgh	Won	
2011	Best Performance in A Continuing Drama	Jane Danson	Won	
2011	Best Continuing Drama	Coronation Street	Won	
2010	Judges Award	Bill Roache	Won	
2010	Best Continuing Drama	Coronation Street	Won	
2009	Best Performance in A Continuing Drama	Katherine Kelly	Nominated	
2008	Best Performance in A Continuing Drama	Katherine Kelly	Nominated	

== Television and Radio Industries Club Awards ==
Year	Category	Nominee	Result	Ref
2001	Special Award	Coronation Street	Won	
2002	TV Soap of the Year	Coronation Street	Nominated	
2003	TV Soap of the Year	Coronation Street	Won	
2004	TV Soap of the Year	Coronation Street	Won	
2005	TV Soap of the Year	Coronation Street	Won	
2006	TV Soap of the Year	Coronation Street	Won	
2007	TV Soap of the Year	Coronation Street	Won	
2008	TV Soap of the Year	Coronation Street	Nominated	
2009	TV Soap of the Year	Coronation Street	Nominated	
2010	TV Soap of the Year	Coronation Street	Nominated	
2011	TV Soap of the Year	Coronation Street	Won	
2012	TV Soap Personality	Betty Driver (Betty Williams)	Won	
2013	TV Soap of the Year	Coronation Street	Won	
2013	TV Soap Personality	Michelle Keegan (Tina McIntyre)	Nominated	

== TV Choice Awards ==
The TV Choice Awards, awarded by TV Choice magazine, began in 1997 as the TV Quick Awards. Between 2005 and 2009 they were known as the TV Quick and TV Choice Awards. They are voted for by readers of the magazine.

Year	Category	Nominee	Result	Ref
2018	Best Soap	Coronation Street	Won	
2018	Best Soap Actor	Jack P Shepherd	Nominated	
2018	Best Soap Actor	Connor McIntyre	Longlisted	
2018	Best Soap Actor	Shayne Ward	Won	
2018	Best Soap Actress	Lucy Fallon	Nominated	
2018	Best Soap Actress	Catherine Tyldesley	Nominated	
2018	Best Soap Actress	Bhavna Limbachia	Longlisted	
2018	Best Soap Newcomer	Ryan Clayton	Nominated	
2018	Best Soap Newcomer	Sally Carman	Longlisted	
2018	Best Soap Newcomer	Charlie de Melo	Longlisted	
2017	Best Soap	Coronation Street	Nominated	
2017	Best Soap Actress	Lucy Fallon	Nominated	
2017	Best Soap Actress	Kym Marsh	Nominated	
2017	Best Soap Newcomer	Julia Goulding	Nominated	
2017	Best Soap Newcomer	Rob Mallard	Nominated	

== TVTimes Awards ==
The TVTimes Awards began in 1969 and are awarded by TVTimes magazine.

Year	Category	Nominee	Result	Ref
2009	Favourite Double Act	Becky and Steve	Nominated	
2009	Favourite Newcomer	Craig Gazey	Nominated	
2009	Favourite Soap Star	Katherine Kelly	Nominated	
2009	Favourite Soap Star	Jennie McAlpine	Nominated	
2010	Favourite Newcomer	Paula Lane	Nominated	
2010	Favourite Soap Star	Simon Gregson	Nominated	
2010	Favourite Soap Star	Katherine Kelly	Nominated	
2011	Favourite Soap Star	Jane Danson	Nominated	
2011	Favourite Soap Star	Chris Gascoyne	Nominated	
2012	Favourite Soap Star	Jane Danson	Nominated	
2012	Favourite Soap Star	Alan Halsall	Nominated	

== Other awards ==
Year	Award	Category	Nominee	Result	Ref
2010	Stonewall Awards	Broadcast of the Year	Coronation Street	Won	
2010	TV Now Awards	Favourite Female Soap Star	Katherine Kelly	Won	
2010	TV Now Awards	Favourite Soap	Coronation Street	Won	
2010	TV Now Awards	Soap Legend	Bill Roache	Won	
2011	Broadcast Awards	Best Soap or Continuing Drama	Coronation Street	Nominated	
2011	Broadcasting Press Guild Awards	Outstanding Contribution to Broadcasting	Tony Warren	Won	
2012	Broadcast Awards	Best Soap or Continuing Drama	Coronation Street	Nominated	
2012	Creative Diversity Network Awards	Radio Times Soap Award	Coronation Street	Won	
2012	Virgin Media TV Awards	Best Baddy	Frank Foster	Nominated	
2012	Virgin Media TV Awards	Best Soap	Coronation Street	Nominated	
