= Kirsty Soames =

Fictional character from Coronation Street

- Coronation Street character
- Portrayed by: Natalie Gumede
- Duration: 2011–2013
- First appearance: Episode 7685; 7 September 2011
- Last appearance: Episode 8096; 3 April 2013
- Introduced by: Phil Collinson
In-universe information
- Occupation: Policewoman; Packer
- Father: Edwin Soames
- Mother: Alison Soames
- Daughters: Ruby Dobbs
- First cousins: Nathan

Kirsty Soames is a fictional character from the British ITV soap opera Coronation Street, played by Natalie Gumede. She made her first on-screen appearance during the episode broadcast on 7 September 2011. On 21 February 2013, Gumede announced she was leaving the soap at the end of her current storyline. She departed on 3 April 2013, after which her character Kirsty was sent to prison. Gumede has won several awards for her portrayal of Kirsty. In June 2021, it was confirmed that Kirsty would be killed off off-screen.

== Casting ==
Casting for Kirsty was announced on 8 July 2011 with Gumede winning the part. On being cast in the role Gumede said, "From the moment I read the script, I knew I was going to love playing Kirsty and I can't wait to see how the story unfolds" adding, "This is a dream role for me and I'm looking forward to creating a huge storm in Weatherfield". Gumede filmed her first scenes in early July.

Kirsty was introduced as a love interest for Tyrone Dobbs (Alan Halsall). While interviewed on This Morning series producer Phil Collinson said that Kirsty's arrival marked the start of a "big storyline" for Tyrone. He added that Tyrone's involvement with Kirsty would not be a "smooth ride".

== Development ==
=== Domestic violence storyline ===
Kirsty's character was seen to be manipulative and controlling, and a pregnancy storyline was written for the character with Kirsty and Tyrone discovering in January 2012 after splitting up with each other. After the character's controlling behaviour was seen on-screen, it was confirmed in March 2012 that Kirsty and Tyrone would become the centre of a domestic violence storyline; with The Sun reporting that Kirsty would "begin psychologically abusing Tyrone, culminating in many vicious, violent attacks".

Upon hearing of the abuse storyline, Gumede and co-star Alan Halsall researched male domestic abuse charities such as ManKind - that support male victims of domestic violence, in order to portray the storyline as realistically as possible. She later told the Daily Record that "there isn't much from the female abuser's point of view to read up on, it was really a case of thinking about it from the victim's point of view." She later said that she found it hard and "draining" to film scenes where she attacked co-star Halsall, and that although "it was all camera tricks, the place I had to emotionally go to was quite ugly." After attacking Tyrone a second time, Kirsty attempts to leave him fearing that she is a danger to him.

In an interview with Digital Spy, Gumede explained that Kirsty's violence stemmed from her childhood. She revealed that "Kirsty had an abusive childhood. Her father hit her on a regular basis up until her 18th birthday, when she left home. The inference is that she's had very little contact with her family since then." In June 2012, Gumede revealed that she was "terrified" at the prospect of filming scenes in which her character gave birth. She explained that "artificial baby bump makes filming difficult, especially in the warm sunshine" and that the upcoming scenes would provide a "further challenge in her career." Gumede told the Anna Mansell from the Lancashire Telegraph that "it has been really interesting how people have said they felt sorry for her" and that "viewers are intrigued to see what happens next as it’s a really complex story for a complex character."

Kirsty gave birth to a daughter, who she and Tyrone named Ruby. After bringing Ruby home, Kirsty struggles to cope with being a mother and when the baby does not stop crying, she trashes the kitchen. The neighbours are forced to alert Tyrone to the situation and he rushes to stop Kirsty. Peter Dyke and Katie Begley of the Daily Star reported that Tyrone considers running away with Ruby to protect her.

=== Departure ===
On 21 February 2013, Gumede announced that she would be leaving Coronation Street. Gumede stated that she had been touched by the support of the viewers, saying "The last 18 months have been incredible, thank you all so much!" The actress filmed her final scenes as Kirsty during the week commencing 25 February. She shot her scenes along with fellow departing actress, Shobna Gulati, who played Sunita Alahan.

== Storylines ==
While on a night out, Tommy Duckworth (Chris Fountain) pays Kirsty to flirt with his friend, Tyrone Dobbs (Alan Halsall) who is single. Kirsty and Tyrone get on well and they exchange phone numbers. Tyrone later learns that Tommy paid Kirsty but she reveals that she is genuinely interested in him.

When Tina McIntyre (Michelle Keegan) parks Rita Sullivan's (Barbara Knox) car across Kirsty's, they argue and Tina accuses Kirsty of scratching Rita's car. However, Kirsty denies it, telling Tina that she is a police officer but dislikes Tina and starts causing problems for her, including getting her accused of suspected shoplifting at a shopping centre and breaking a bottle of her perfume. She accidentally has Rita stopped for speeding but gets the ticket cancelled as she thought Tina would be driving. When Tyrone overhears Kirsty admitting to Tina that she set her up and threatening her, he ends the relationship. When Tina refuses to let her see Tyrone, Kirsty follows them in her police car as she is convinced they are secretly dating, but Tina sees her and is driving to the police station when they are involved in a minor accident and all three are taken to hospital. Kirsty then learns that she is pregnant. Tyrone decides to give Kirsty a second chance but Tina reports Kirsty for harassment but is persuaded to drop the case. Tina, determined to get her out of Tyrone's life, gets Tommy to follow her and when they see her meeting a man, they assume that Kirsty is cheating on Tyrone but are disappointed when Kirsty tells Tyrone that she was meeting her cousin about a present for him and is so disgusted by the accusation of infidelity that she then leaves. Tyrone goes to the police station and apologises before proposing and she accepts.

Kirsty threatens Tommy, warning him that no one will ever come between her and Tyrone and is not pleased when Tyrone lends Tommy some money, but agrees to help him investigate Terry Duckworth's (Nigel Pivaro) dealings with a local councillor. Tyrone and Kirsty go to the councillor's office, looking for evidence of corruption but get caught. The councillor is arrested for accepting bribes and Kirsty is sacked from the police force for breaking and entering so Tyrone gets her a job in packing at Underworld. Kirsty, however, is horrified and lashes out at Tyrone with a ladle. She apologises and Tyrone tells his friends that his injuries were accidental. Despite Kirsty insisting that she doesn't want any fuss for her birthday, Tyrone organises a surprise party and invites her parents. When her father learns she is pregnant and was sacked from the police force, he verbally attacks her and leaves, causing another argument between her and Tyrone. When he tries to walk away, she forces him up against a door. Tyrone walks out and when he returns, he finds Kirsty has packed a bag but Tyrone demands an explanation so Kirsty reveals that her father domestically abused her and her mother until she left home. Tyrone forgives Kirsty and she stays. Kirsty helps Tina when she and Tommy are hassled by Rick Neelan (Greg Wood), a loan shark. She uses her police connections to get Rick arrested and Tina thanks her.

Kirsty later suffers Braxton Hicks contractions in the cafe and panics when she can't get hold of Tyrone. When she learns that he was fixing Fiz Stape's (Jennie McAlpine) boiler, she gets jealous and they argue again. She destroys plates and a picture of Tyrone and Jack Duckworth (Bill Tarmey) but apologises, blaming her pregnancy hormones. When Tyrone and Fiz organise a baby shower and Tyrone tells Kirsty that Fiz helped him pick out items for the baby, she gets jealous again and insists that Tyrone has no further contact with Fiz. Her anger is sparked again when she learns that he has given Tommy a payment holiday so he and Tina can visit his grandmother in Blackpool. This causes another argument and she hits him again, using an accessory from a vacuum cleaner, leaving him badly bruised. This time, Tyrone asks Kirsty to see a doctor about her anger issues but she leaves just before the appointment but Deirdre Barlow (Anne Kirkbride) tells Tyrone this so they argue in the garden and angry, Tyrone pushes Kirsty away from him and she falls, cutting her head. Deirdre, having overheard the argument, asks Kirsty if she is okay and calls Dr. Matt Carter (Oliver Mellor), while Kirsty sends Tyrone to the pub so she can have a nap. When Tyrone returns, he finds Kirsty has packed her bags and she leaves, despite Tyrone asking her to stay. Tommy finds Kirsty at the hospital and asks her to come back, as Tyrone is suffering without her. Despite initially refusing, she returns a couple of days later and finds Tyrone talking to another woman while Dev chats to her friend. He asks her to stay and she agrees, angering Tina so she tells Tommy that Kirsty was abusing Tyrone and insists Tommy and Tina increase their repayments. She also causes problems by costing Tommy a security job and persuading Julie Carp (Katy Cavanagh) and Brian Packham (Peter Gunn) to buy Jason Grimshaw's (Ryan Thomas) flat, making Tina and Tommy homeless. They move into Owen Armstrong's (Ian Puleston-Davies) flat over the builder's yard.

Kirsty goes past her due date, but when Tina pushes her into a table during a fight in The Rovers, they realise she is in labour. Marcus Dent (Charlie Condou) and Gloria Price (Sue Johnston) deliver Kirsty's baby, who she names Ruby Dobbs (Grace Hanrahan/Macy Alabi). After bringing Ruby home, Kirsty struggles and when Ruby won't stop crying, she trashes the house. Tyrone tells her that he does not trust her with Ruby so he is pleased when Kirsty's mother, Alison Soames (Dawn Hope), visits, telling them that she has left Edwin Soames (David Lonsdale). Kirsty reluctantly allows Alison to stay and appreciates her help but Edwin arrives and snatches Ruby briefly to make Alison go home. Kirsty blames Tyrone for her father's reappearance and throws a candlestick at him so Tyrone ends the relationship is over and tells her to leave but insists that Ruby will stay with him. However, Kirsty tells him that he has no legal right to keep Ruby as his name is not on her birth certificate, forcing him to change his mind. Instead, they agree that he will stay at home to look after Ruby, while Kirsty goes back to work. However, Fiz knows about Kirsty's abuse and she notices the change in Fiz's attitude to her. Wanting Tyrone and Ruby to get out and meet people, she asks Katy Armstrong (Georgia May Foote) to take him to a mother and baby group, making Kirsty jealous again so she asks him not to go. When Fiz questions her about this, Kirsty is angered and in revenge, switches Fiz's sewing machine back on while she is trying to repair it, so she needs to go to hospital. Kirsty then takes charge of the first aid and takes Fiz to hospital so no one believes her when she insists Kirsty caused her injury.

Realising she cannot trust Tyrone because of numerous texts from Fiz, Kirsty locks Tyrone in the house and takes his phone and keys with her. When Tyrone complains, she attacks him again but this time, shows no remorse and demands he apologize. Tyrone couldn't take any more, planning to run away with Ruby but Fiz and Tommy stop him and suggest he marry Kirsty so he will have parental responsibility. Tyrone and Kirsty make up and they begin planning the wedding. On Tyrone's birthday, Kirsty sees a card from Fiz and punishes him by slamming a door on his arm, injuring him. She apologizes again and they continue with the wedding plans but Kirsty becomes paranoid about Fiz and causes a fight by insulting her and her daughter, Hope. Shortly before the wedding, Kirsty finds Tyrone's secret phone that proves he and Fiz are now having an affair so she invites her to the wedding and during the ceremony, exposes the affair. Kirsty realises that Tyrone was only marrying her for custody of Ruby. At home, they argue on the stairs and when Kirsty tries to hit Tyrone, she loses her balance and falls. At the hospital, Kirsty tells the police that Tyrone has been hitting her for months so the police arrest Tyrone and Ruby goes into temporary foster care. However, he is released on bail. She suggests Tyrone come home and make a fresh start but he refuses, saying that he'll never forgive Kirsty for what she did so she tells Tyrone he can't see Ruby, leading him and Fiz to snatch her and run away. Kirsty is worried about her baby and reports her missing but Fiz knows they can't live on the run and calls the police so Tyrone is arrested. He is charged with assaulting Kirsty, much to her delight. Fiz tells Kirsty that the truth will come out.

Fiz and Tina find Alison and tells her what has happened but she refuses to believe them. When she confronts Kirsty, however, she admits it and promises to tell the police everything but changes her mind when she sees Alison leaving Tina's flat. In court, she stuck to her statement, much to Fiz and Alison's disgust. Alison offers to move in with her and help with Ruby, on condition that she tells the truth but Kirsty refuses, telling Alison that she is not welcome. However, the truth comes out when she finds Sally Webster (Sally Dynevor) looking after Ruby and angrily chucked her out, shouting at Julie for abandoning her and throws a cup at her. She immediately apologizes, blaming her stressful day. The next day, Ruby won't stop crying and Kirsty asks Dr. Carter for sleeping pills but storms out when he refuses. Julie, worried about what she saw, confronts Kirsty but she loses her temper and slaps Julie and gives her a bloody lip, so she runs out. Realising that now everyone will soon know the truth, she breaks down. When Ruby won't stop crying, she screams at her to shut up. Julie and Sean notice that Ruby has stopped crying and go to investigate, finding the house empty so Brian and Julie go to court but are told that Julie's complaint is not relevant to Tyrone's case and to go to the police if they want to make a formal complaint. Meanwhile, Kirsty and Ruby go into the courtroom and Kirsty admits that she is the monster, not Tyrone. Ruby was taken to social services, Tyrone ended up back in his cell and Kirsty was arrested. She admitted everything to the police and Tyrone was discharged from the court, and Ruby is returned to him. Kirsty sees Tyrone and Fiz walking away with her baby while she is taken to prison.

The next day, Kirsty wants to see Tyrone. He visits her and tells her not to contact him or Ruby ever again and that he's not scared of her anymore. Kirsty admits that she is the villain and says that she will get help, but Tyrone has heard it all before. He is sympathetic when Kirsty pours her heart out about changing her story for Ruby. Tyrone tells her that she'll always be Ruby's mother and that she'll always love her. Tyrone then leaves and Kirsty is escorted back to the prison cells.

In April 2014, Tyrone receives a call, saying that Kirsty has been released from prison. He later starts receiving anonymous text messages from an unknown person named "K". Tyrone believes that this is Kirsty but it is later revealed that the culprit was Maria Connor (Samia Longchambon), in a bid to try and reconcile her relationship with him. The police later reveal that the text messages came from within the United Kingdom, and that Kirsty no longer lives in the UK, but could not disclose her whereabouts for legal reasons.

In June 2021, Tyrone receives a visit from a police officer who informs him that Kirsty has died from an aneurysm. Unaware of how to feel, Tyrone visits Fiz to inform her of the news and they later inform Ruby that her biological mother has died.

== Reception ==
For her portrayal of Kirsty, Gumede received the Best Newcomer accolade at The British Soap Awards 2012. She was later nominated for Best Soap Newcomer at the TVChoice Awards and Most Popular Newcomer at the 18th National Television Awards. Gumede won Best Bitch at the 2013 Inside Soap Awards. In Digital Spy's 2012 end of year reader poll, Kirsty's domestic abuse storyline with Tyrone won Best Storyline with 28.3% of the vote.

Inside Soap's Kate White commented "Hurrah for Corrie's Ker-azy Kirsty! She's as mad as a March Hare hiding under the Mad Hatter's maddest hat." At The British Soap Awards 2013, Gumede won "Best Dramatic Performance" and "Villain of the Year" for her portrayal of Kirsty. She also won "Best Storyline" at The British Soap Awards 2013, alongside Alan Halsall and Jennie McAlpine, with the nomination being named, "Kirsty's abuse of Tyrone".

== See also ==
- List of Coronation Street characters (2011)
- List of soap opera villains
