= List of Coronation Street characters introduced in 2012 =

Coronation Street is a British soap opera first broadcast on 9 December 1960. The following is a list of characters that first appeared or will appear in 2012, by order of first appearance. All characters were introduced by series producer Phil Collinson. Milton Fanshaw (Robert Vaughn), a new love interest for Sylvia Goodwin (Stephanie Cole), arrived in January. Carla Connor's (Alison King) younger brother, Rob Donovan (Marc Baylis), made his first appearance in July. Stella Price's (Michelle Collins) mother Gloria Price (Sue Johnston), Tyrone Dobbs (Alan Halsall) and Kirsty Soames' (Natalie Gumede) baby daughter Ruby Dobbs, Lloyd Mullaney's (Craig Charles) ex-girlfriend Mandy Kamara (Pamela Nomvete) and their daughter, Jenna (Krissi Bohn) made their debuts in September. A face from Lewis Archer's (Nigel Havers) past, Penny Thornley (Susan Hanson), arrived in October and Carole Evans (Debbie Arnold), an enemy of Stella, made her debut in November.

== Milton Fanshaw ==
Milton Fanshaw
- Coronation Street character
- Portrayed by: Robert Vaughn
- First appearance: Episode 7788; 27 January 2012
- Last appearance: Episode 7804; 19 February 2012
- Introduced by: Phil Collinson
In-universe information
- Daughters: Charity Fanshaw

Milton Fanshaw, played by Robert Vaughn, made his first on-screen appearance on 27 January 2012. Milton was introduced as a new love interest for Sylvia Goodwin (Stephanie Cole). The character and casting were announced on 2 November 2011. Vaughn had a three-week guest stint with the show. Of Vaughn's casting, Coronation Street producer Phil Collinson commented: "I am delighted to be welcoming The Man from U.N.C.L.E. to Coronation Street. Robert was a huge part of my childhood and a magnificent actor. I am looking forward to seeing the impact this exotic character has on the ladies of Weatherfield." The actor began filming his first scenes on 7 December 2011. Steve White from the Daily Mirror reported that Vaughn would be using the former dressing room of Betty Driver (who played Betty Williams). The dressing room had been locked after Driver's death in October 2011. Milton is a wealthy American who meets Sylvia whilst she is away on a cruise holiday. itv.com said Milton "puts the cat firmly amongst the pigeons." Will Thorp (who played Chris Gray) called Vaughn's casting "incredible", while a Coronation Street insider said Vaughn's casting had given the show's cast a "massive boost."

Sylvia met Milton on a cruise holiday that she won, and was given a banjo by him as a gift which she showed off to her friends and family. She kept in contact with him, but her son Roy didn't like her running up his phone bill. Sylvia was upset that she hadn't heard from Milton for a couple of days. As Sylvia plays "Ain't She Sweet" on her eukebanjo at a music competition in the Rovers, she's overjoyed when Milton suddenly appears beside her and sings along to her tune. Sylvia proudly introduces Milton to the assembled crowd. Milton tells Sylvia that he intends to stick around in Weatherfield for a while. Sylvia hides her concern.

Milton insists on visiting Roy's "restaurant". Sylvia panics and lies, telling him that Roy owns the Bistro. Milton is impressed by it, but soon it becomes clear that Roy is not the owner. Sylvia admits that she lied to impress him and Milton is sympathetic. Sylvia shows Milton the café. Milton enthuses to Roy about how much he loves his "retro diner". Milton excitedly tells Roy and Hayley how they should turn Roy's Rolls into a railway-themed restaurant called "Beef Encounter" and open a chain of them across the globe. Roy's underwhelmed whilst Sylvia thinks that Milton's a genius. Milton mistakenly thinks the reason that Roy isn't keen on his wonderful business idea is due to a lack of funds and tells Sylvia that it is easily solved. Milton tells Roy that they will be partners in "Beef Encounter" as he plans to buy the premises next-door and remove the dividing wall. Roy makes it plain to Milton that they will never be business partners and Sylvia is shocked by her son's outburst.

Sylvia tells Roy that she is ashamed of him for throwing Milton's offer back in his face. Hayley stands by Roy's decision not to accept Milton's offer. Milton asks Sylvia to move back to America with him. Sylvia tells Roy how Milton's invited her to live in the United States with him, hoping that Roy will beg her to stay. Roy remains stiff upper-lipped and Sylvia is upset. Milton and Sylvia prepare to leave for the airport. Roy still can't admit that he doesn't want his mother to leave. Hayley is exasperated with him. Milton and Sylvia leave for Palm Springs. Still concealing his feelings, Roy sadly waves them off. Hayley is concerned for him. Roy admits to Hayley the reason he couldn't bring himself to ask Sylvia to stay was for fear of her rejecting him again. As Hayley comforts him, there's a knock at the door. Sylvia bustles in explaining how Milton returned to America alone as she realised at the check-in queue she couldn't possibly live with a bunch of loud Americans. Roy and Sylvia share a smile, each pleased to see the other.

A few weeks later, at his home in Palm Springs, Milton had a fall at his poolside where he was discovered by his maid. Sylvia flew over to California to look after him whilst he recovered.

== Meredith McGuire ==
Meredith McGuire
- Coronation Street character
- Portrayed by: Su Douglas
- First appearance: Episode 7791; 30 January 2012
- Last appearance: Episode 7907; 13 July 2012
- Introduced by: Phil Collinson
In-universe information
- Occupation: School Governor
- Granddaughters: Lindsay Hayward

Meredith McGuire, played by Su Douglas was the governor of Bessie Street School. She made two appearances in Coronation Street. The first was on 30 January. Brian Packham (Peter Gunn) was afraid of her, and she also warned him that if he didn't improve the school's results in three months, he would be fired from his job. Brian eventually made up a healthy regime for school lunches and other rules as well.

Five months later, Meredith made her second appearance on 12 July when she was shocked to discover that her granddaughter Lindsay Hayward (Eleni Foskett) was bullying pupil Faye Windass (Ellie Leach). She forced Lindsay to apologize, and also assured Faye's adoptive mother Anna (Debbie Rush) that her granddaughter will be disciplined. Three months later, it was shockingly revealed that Meredith had died of unknown causes on 23 September. Ken Barlow (William Roache) would eventually be elected to take her place as governor of Bessie Street.

== Alison Soames ==
Alison Soames
- Coronation Street character
- Portrayed by: Dawn Hope
- Duration: 2012–2013
- First appearance: Episode 7873; 24 May 2012
- Last appearance: Episode 8090; 25 March 2013
- Introduced by: Phil Collinson
In-universe information
- Husband: Edwin Soames
- Daughters: Kirsty Soames
- Granddaughters: Ruby Dobbs

Alison Soames, played by Dawn Hope, made her first screen appearance on 24 May 2012. The previous month, Natalie Gumede revealed that Kirsty Soames' parents would be introduced to Coronation Street. The actress commented that seeing Kirsty's parents would give viewers "more of a clue as to what made her the way she is." Hope's casting was announced on 18 May. Daniel Kilkelly from Digital Spy reported that Alison and her husband Edwin (David Lonsdale) are invited to their daughter's birthday party, where they discover she is engaged and pregnant. Kilkelly added "Both Kirsty and Alison appear fearful of Ed, which is explored further when Kirsty later opens up to Tyrone about her troubled past…" In August 2012, producer Phil Collinson revealed that Alison and Edwin would be making another appearance the following month. In January 2013, Kilkelly reported that Alison would be returning, in the wake of Kirsty's accusations that Tyrone was abusing her.

Edwin and Alison arrive at their daughter's surprise birthday party, invited by her fiancé, Tyrone Dobbs (Alan Halsall). The couple are shocked when they learn that Kirsty is engaged and pregnant. They leave after Edwin learns that Kirsty has been dismissed from the police force. Kirsty reveals to Tyrone that she and Alison have suffered from Edwin's domestic abuse for years and Kirsty resents her mother for sticking by him.

Alison returns a few months later. She reveals to Kirsty that she has left Edwin, after they argued about her visiting Kirsty and Ruby. Kirsty and Tyrone invite Alison to live with them, in return for help in caring for Ruby. However, a few days later, Edwin arrives and kidnaps Ruby, as a mean of blackmailing Alison to come back to him. Kirsty pleads with her mother not to go, but Alison goes with Edwin.

Alison returns on 4 March 2013, when Tina McIntyre (Michelle Keegan) and Fiz Stape (Jennie McAlpine) went to look for her. They tell her everything about Kirsty's domestic violence against Tyrone. Alison refuses to believe it and storms out. However, she visits Kirsty and initially plays along with the lie. After a few hours, she demands Kirsty tell her the truth and then persuades Kirsty to tell the truth in court, saying that she'll be free of the nightmare she is living and she'll be proud of her regardless. Kirsty agrees but when she sees Alison leaving Tina's flat, she changes her mind and tells Alison that Fiz is Tyrone's girlfriend. Tina and Fiz beg Alison to tell the police for Tyrone and Ruby's sake, but she refuses, saying that she will not choose them over her daughter. Alison returns while Kirsty is giving evidence against Tyrone. She tells her she is ashamed of her. Alison meets Kirsty at the café and offers to help her in the house, on condition that she tells the truth. Kirsty angrily refuses and tells Alison she is not welcome any more.

Following Kirsty's death of an aneurysm in 2021, Tyrone tells Fiz that Alison has also died.

== Edwin Soames ==
Edwin Soames
- Coronation Street character
- Portrayed by: David Lonsdale
- First appearance: Episode 7873; 24 May 2012
- Last appearance: Episode 7965; 28 September 2012
- Introduced by: Phil Collinson
In-universe information
- Occupation: Police Officer
- Wife: Alison Soames
- Daughters: Kirsty Soames
- Granddaughters: Ruby Dobbs

Edwin Soames, played by David Lonsdale is the father of Kirsty Soames (Natalie Gumede), who is contacted by Tyrone Dobbs (Alan Halsall) and invited to his daughter's birthday party, along with wife Alison (Dawn Hope). Edwin and Alison are shocked to find Kirsty is engaged and pregnant. They leave after an argument. In an August 2012, interview, series producer Phil Collinson revealed that Edwin and Alison would make a future appearance. Alison comes to Coronation Street to visit Kirsty and the baby and she reveals that she has left Edwin. In 2021, Kirsty dies and Tyrone reveals to Fiz Brown (Jennie McAlpine) that Alison has also passed away and nobody has been able to contact Edwin.

Lonsdale is best known for playing David Stockwell in long-running ITV period drama Heartbeat between 1993 and 2009, but has also appeared in Coronation Street before, playing Peter Barlow in 1986 for 8 episodes before the role was recast to Chris Gascoyne 14 years later in 2000.

== Aiden Lester ==
Aiden Lester
- Coronation Street character
- Portrayed by: Toby Sawyer
- First appearance: Episode 7875; 25 May 2012
- Last appearance: Episode 7993; 9 November 2012
- Introduced by: Phil Collinson
In-universe information
- Occupation: Nurse

Aiden Lester, played by Toby Sawyer is a colleague of Marcus Dent (Charlie Condou). Aiden does not realise that Marcus is trying to set him up romantically with Maria Connor (Samia Ghadie) while they go for a drink. Marcus tells Maria that Aiden is interested in her and she tries to kiss him. Aiden reveals that he is gay and attracted to Marcus. After Marcus breaks up with Sean Tully (Antony Cotton), he and Aiden begin dating. Aiden eventually wants to move to London with Marcus, but before he left, Marcus revealed that he still had feelings for Sean leaving Aiden distraught, leaving without him.

== Rob Donovan ==
Robert Darren "Rob" Donovan, played by Marc Baylis, made his first on-screen appearance during the episode broadcast on 9 July 2012. Rob is the estranged brother of Carla Connor (Alison King). Rob was originally named "Darren" and had previously been mentioned in the series and by cast and crew members during interviews. He had no role in Carla's life until he showed up in Weatherfield; as he had been serving an eight-year sentence in Strangeways prison for armed robbery.

== Gloria Price ==
Gloria Price
- Coronation Street character
- Portrayed by: Sue Johnston
- Duration: 2012–2014
- First appearance: Episode 7948; 5 September 2012
- Last appearance: Episode 8328; 21 February 2014
- Introduced by: Phil Collinson
In-universe information
- Occupation: Barmaid; Pub Landlady; Talent Agent
- Daughters: Stella Price
- Granddaughters: Leanne Battersby; Eva Price
- Other relatives: Oliver Battersby; Susie Price; Simon Barlow

Gloria Price, played by Sue Johnston, made her first screen appearance on 5 September 2012. Daniel Kilkelly of Digital Spy reported in early March 2012 that Coronation Street producers were looking to cast Stella Price's (Michelle Collins) mother. Kilkelly said Johnston was thought to be at the top of the producers' wish list. The character and Johnston's casting was announced on 2 April 2012 by series producer Phil Collinson. Collinson said he was "delighted" to welcome Johnston to the cast of Coronation Street. He added "She has been at the heart of the very best comedy and drama the UK has produced over last 30 years and will step into the heart of Coronation Street as her character, Gloria, takes up running The Rovers with daughter Stella." Johnston began filming her first scenes on 26 April 2012. However, two weeks later Johnston fell ill and scripts had to be rewritten. Johnston resumed filming in July and the date of her on screen introduction was changed to September.

Gloria arrived in Coronation Street from Spain, where she had been running a bar. She initially told her daughter she would be staying for a short time, but this eventually turns into a few months and Stella "becomes suspicious about what her mum has really been up to abroad and why she isn't returning." A writer for itv.com said sparks would fly between Gloria and Stella. Gloria will also have her eye on Dennis Tanner (Philip Lowrie) and Lewis Archer (Nigel Havers). The writer added "Larger than life, ballsy and outspoken Gloria will be in the great tradition of strong Weatherfield women who don't take no for an answer and live life to the full." Collinson thought Gloria was a "very vivid, brilliant character" and called her feisty and domineering.

On 20 June 2013, it was announced that Johnston was to leave Coronation Street to pursue other roles and left in February 2014. Producers left the door open for a potential return for Gloria in the future. She departed on 21 February 2014.

=== Storylines ===
Gloria arrives in Weatherfield to visit her daughter, Stella Price (Michelle Collins), and her granddaughters, Leanne Battersby (Jane Danson) and Eva Price (Catherine Tyldesley). When she learns that Stella has broken up with Karl Munro (John Michie), she tries to get them back together but this fails. Gloria soon takes over the running of Stella's pub The Rovers Return and enters a "Pub of the Year" contest run by a local magazine. Gloria soon comes into conflict with Norris Cole (Malcolm Hebden) and Mary Taylor (Patti Clare) and later discovers that they have left negative remarks about her on their comment cards. Gloria is quick to help when Kirsty Soames (Natalie Gumede) goes into labour in the pub. She later flirts with Dennis Tanner (Philip Lowrie), much to his wife Rita's (Barbara Knox) annoyance. Gloria later helps Gail McIntyre (Helen Worth) out with a plan to test Lewis Archer's (Nigel Havers) loyalty to Audrey Roberts (Sue Nicholls). Gloria tells Lewis that she is terminally ill with cancer and he keeps it a secret while supporting her. Audrey finds out about the plan, but decides not to tell Lewis about it. Gloria asks Lewis to run away with her but he refuses. When he tells Stella about Gloria's illness, she reveals that she is fine and it was all part of her and Gail's plan. Lewis gets his revenge on Gloria by helping to reveal that she has cheated in the "Pub of the Year" competition. Stella then throws her out and she leaves Weatherfield.

Gloria returns to Weatherfield with her new fiancé Eric Babbage (Timothy West) in February 2013. Eric hears Stella cast Gloria as a "gold digger", making him have second thoughts about their wedding. He tells Gloria's youngest granddaughter Eva that he is calling off his engagement with Gloria and would much prefer it if Eva came with him on an upcoming cruise. Stella tells Gloria what Eric has been up to, but shortly afterwards, Eric dies, leaving Gloria and Eva devastated. Gloria sells her engagement ring and Eva sells the necklace that he gave her, so that they could both give Eric a good send off. Gloria is shocked to learn that Stella is dating Jason Grimshaw (Ryan Thomas) and she remains friends with Karl but feuds with his current girlfriend Sunita Alahan (Shobna Gulati). When Stella tells her that Karl made a pass at her and tried to kidnap her, Gloria is horrified. She tells Jason, Lloyd Mullaney (Craig Charles) and Steve McDonald (Simon Gregson) in front of Karl, leading to Karl and Jason coming to blows in the pub. Stella accuses Gloria of being too nosey. Gloria is horrified when the pub is set on fire and Stella is trapped inside. Karl tries to save Stella but they both become trapped and Paul Kershaw (Tony Hirst) rescues them. At the hospital, Gloria tells Stella that she is the only good thing that she has done in her life. Jason comes under suspicion when people start questioning how the fire started, as he had been working on the pub's electrics. Jason tries to point the finger at Karl, which angers Gloria. The police inform Stella, Gloria and Karl that the fire was no accident and that the person who started it used a spare set of keys to gain access to the pub. They start to suspect Sunita, who was also trapped in the pub and in a critical condition. Sunita dies and Stella gets angry with Gloria when she insults Sunita. Gloria, Stella, Eva and Karl move into 13 Coronation Street after Stella and Karl reunite.

Gloria learns that Stella is in a large amount of debt and watches in horror as building yard owner, Owen Armstrong (Ian Puleston-Davies) smashes up the repairs of The Rovers that he has already done. Stella and Karl announce their engagement and Gloria buys them champagne at the Bistro, which angers Owen and his partner, Anna Windass (Debbie Rush), who think Stella has money. Stella repeatedly tries to tell Owen that Gloria paid for the champagne. Gloria later explains to Stella, Eva and Karl that Eric left her £80,000 in his will and that she would not give it to Stella because she wanted it for herself. However, Gloria visits Owen and gives him the money to continue the repairs on the pub. Gloria becomes co-owner and landlady of the pub with Stella. When Izzy Armstrong (Cherylee Houston) reveals to Gloria that she cannot have a welcome home party for her baby son Jake at the Bistro, Gloria suggests that she have the party at The Rovers, which upsets fellow barmaid Tina McIntyre (Michelle Keegan), as she was baby Jake's surrogate mother. The party goes ahead, and Gloria is not happy when she hears that Tina threw a glass of wine in Tracy Barlow's (Kate Ford) face. She forces Sean Tully (Antony Cotton) to work on his night off, while she visits Leanne's husband Nick Tilsley (Ben Price) in hospital, following his car accident. Gloria is present when young Craig Tinker (Colson Smith) is attacked by two bullies, and they shout at Gloria, Karl and Craig's mother Beth (Lisa George). Gloria and Beth then attend Stella's hen party and Gloria helps her prepare for her wedding to Karl. Gloria is delighted when Stella and Karl get hitched, but there's horror when Sunita's former husband Dev Alahan (Jimmi Harkishin) and Jason discover that Karl was the person who burnt down The Rovers, killed Sunita and has been terrorizing Craig. Dev confronts Karl, leading to a fight and Karl knocking Dev unconscious. When Stella arrives to see what her new husband is getting up to, he holds both Dev and Stella hostage. Gloria, Eva, Leanne and the rest of the wedding guests rush to The Rovers. Stella later escapes and Karl is arrested.

Gloria is shocked to learn that Eva and Jason have begun a relationship. She scolds them, but Stella insists that she is fine with it. Stella then tells Gloria and Eva that she wants to sell her share of The Rovers, which upsets Gloria, as she put her life savings into the pub. However, Gloria also decides to sell her share of the pub and her and Stella both work at the Bistro. Gloria and Stella are present when Liz McDonald (Beverley Callard) returns and splits up a catfight between Kylie Platt (Paula Lane) and Tina. Gloria and the rest of the Price family then support Leanne when she discovers that Nick and Kylie had a one-night stand on Christmas Day 2012. Gloria is later seen on a girls' night out with Stella and Tina and is later accompanied by Leanne. Leanne is clearly upset as Nick has frightened some children at Faye Windass' (Ellie Leach) Halloween party. Gloria orders Leanne to snap out of her selfish behaviour as she clearly loves Nick to pieces and she did cheat on him first. Leanne and Nick later reconcile. On Christmas Day 2013, Gloria and the rest of the Prices are horrified when Nick slaps Leanne across the face over a Christmas cracker joke. Gloria is adamant on calling the police much to Gail's frustration. Gloria doesn't call the police, but is later concerned for Leanne's marriage to Nick.

In early 2014, Gloria helps Dennis when he contacts his old friend, Ritchie de Vries (Robin Askwith) and they begin a musical venture. Dennis' wife Rita isn't very happy with the friendship he has formed with Gloria, especially when it turns flirtatious. Eventually, their relationship gets too much for Rita and when she argues with Dennis, he calls her "old", claiming that Gloria is 10 years younger than her. This leads to Rita throwing Dennis out of their flat. Dennis subsequently sleeps at Gloria's house, on her sofa. The next day, Rita and Dennis reconcile, but when the couple are enjoying a Valentine's Day meal, Gloria can't help but intervene and tells Rita that Dennis slept at her house the night before. Rita then throws Dennis out again, much to the delight of Gloria. Gloria decides that there is nothing left for her in Weatherfield, so reveals to her family that she is leaving for to travel the world. At the Bistro, Leanne, Stella, Eva, Jason and Gail wait for Gloria, as they have thrown her a farewell party. Eva then notices that Gloria has turned up in a shiny red flash car. After this, Gloria privately says goodbye to Stella and joins the others for her party. She then tells Dennis that if he wants to accommodate her to France, then he is welcome to. Just as Gloria is driving away from Coronation Street, she is stopped by Dennis, who jumps into the car with Gloria and the pair harshly bid farewell to a devastated Rita. However, when Dennis and Gloria's relationship does not work out, he returns to Weatherfield.

In February 2015, Eva goes to stay with Gloria, who has finished travelling and bought a villa in the South of France, after her relationship with Jason ends. In August 2018, Eva moves to the South of France to live with Gloria and Stella, so they can help her raise her newborn daughter, Susie, away from Weatherfield.

== Ruby Dobbs ==
Ruby Dobbs
- Coronation Street character
- Portrayed by: Grace Hanrahan (2012–2013); Macy Alabi (2012–2023); Billie Naylor (2023–present)
- Duration: 2012–present
- First appearance: Episode 7949; 9 September 2012
- Introduced by: Phil Collinson
In-universe information
- Other names: Ruby Soames
- Father: Tyrone Dobbs
- Mother: Kirsty Soames
- Adoptive mother: Fiz Brown
- Sisters: Hope Dobbs (adoptive)
- Half-brothers: Dorin Pop
- Grandfathers: Edwin Soames; Ross Wilkes; Darren Dobbs (adoptive)
- Grandmothers: Alison Soames; Cassie Plummer; Jackie Dobbs (adoptive); Cilla Battersby-Brown (adoptive)
- First cousins: Aled Winter-Brown (adoptive); Carys Winter-Brown (adoptive); Llio Winter-Brown (adoptive); Bryn Winter-Brown (adoptive)
- Other relatives: Evelyn Plummer

Ruby Dobbs (also Soames) is the daughter of Tyrone Dobbs (Alan Halsall) and Kirsty Soames (Natalie Gumede), played by Grace Hanrahan from 2012 to 2013, Macy Alabi from 2012 to 2023 and Billie Naylor since August 2023. She was born on-screen on 9 September 2012. Kirsty gives birth to Ruby at The Rovers Return, following a fight with Tina McIntyre (Michelle Keegan). Kirsty is pushed on to a table and Gumede revealed "It becomes apparent immediately that the baby is coming - the pain is acute and her waters break. Marcus Dent (Charlie Condou) is there and, as a midwife, he's able to recognise that this tot is going to come pretty quickly." Once Ruby comes home, Kirsty struggles to cope. When Ruby does not stop crying, Kirsty trashes the kitchen, causing the neighbours to alert Tyrone. When Tyrone threatens to take Ruby away from Kirsty, she lies to him he is not Ruby's father. Peter Dyke and Katie Begley from the Daily Star reported that Kirsty tells Tyrone she registered Ruby's birth alone and left the father's name blank, meaning he had no legal right over their child.

Ruby was born to Tyrone and Kirsty in September 2012. Kirsty had gone into labour when she was attacked by Tina at the Rovers, leading to the birth taking place in the pub's back room. Tyrone had often been the victim of domestic abuse from Kirsty but was convinced that Ruby's arrival would change everything for the better. In reality, Kirsty's physical and verbal abuse towards Tyrone continued and she left his name off Ruby's birth certificate, preventing him from holding any legal rights over her. Tyrone started a secret affair with Fiz Stape (Jennie McAlpine), who helped him cope with the situation and persuaded him to marry Kirsty so that he would have legal guardianship over Ruby. However, Kirsty learned of the affair after finding messages on Tyrone's burner phone, and on the day of the wedding in January 2013, announced what she had learned to all the guests and swore that Tyrone would never see Ruby again.

During an altercation with Tyrone, Kirsty fell down the stairs and used the incident to claim Tyrone was abusing her. Tyrone and Fiz ran away with Ruby and Fiz's daughter Hope Stape (Faith and Nicole Holt), but were ultimately tracked down by police, with Tyrone ending up in court over his alleged abuse towards Kirsty. Kirsty struggled to look after Ruby which led to her screaming at a crying Ruby. During Tyrone's trial in March 2013, Kirsty rushed in to the courtroom and handed Ruby to him, knowing that she couldn't be trusted not to abuse her like she had Tyrone and confessed the truth to the court. Ultimately, Tyrone was released and Kirsty was sent to prison for perjury, promising to stay out of Ruby's life to ensure Ruby would be safe from her. Tyrone was granted full custody of Ruby and was able to form a family unit with Fiz and Hope, while also changing Ruby's surname to Dobbs.

In December 2017, Ruby appeared to be displaying behavioural problems starting when she pushed Hope (now played by Isabella Flanagan) leading to a broken arm and a lighter was found in her box after the family trampoline had been set on fire. Several incidents followed, including one where Hope and Ruby locked themselves in a room with an electric saw turned on, with the key found in Ruby's pocket. Eventually, Fiz learned that it was actually Hope who was misbehaving and had been pinning the blame on Ruby but did not admit the truth to Tyrone until he furiously hit Ruby. Tyrone was immediately mortified after doing so, as it reminded him of when Kirsty used to abuse him.

In December 2018, Fiz and Hope moved to a specialist unit in Birmingham to deal with Hope's bad behaviour, with Tyrone and Ruby staying back home along with Tyrone's maternal grandmother Evelyn Plummer (Maureen Lipman) who had recently moved in with them. Fiz and Hope returned in August 2019 and, to the jealousy of Ruby, instead of going to school Hope was tutored at home by Fiz and her support teacher Jade Rowan (Lottie Henshall), who was later revealed to be Hope's half-sister by their deceased father John Stape (Graeme Hawley). Jade gave Hope and Ruby a lot of attention but was secretly building up false evidence that they were being abused by Fiz. An investigation by social services took place and Hope and Ruby had to be removed from Tyrone and Fiz’s care in January 2020, although they soon returned home when Fiz agreed to temporarily move out. Ruby divulged that bruises photographed on Hope's arm were actually make-up, which led to all the evidence against Fiz being discredited and the investigation being dropped. Jade continued to see Hope and Ruby after she redeemed herself, but would primarily ignore Ruby in favour of Hope due to their relation. Jade was sent away in March 2020 after she made a pass at Tyrone.

In 2021, Tyrone fell for Alina Pop (Ruxandra Porojnicu), ending his relationship with Fiz. Tyrone and Alina subsequently moved into the flat together; however, Ruby and Hope stayed with Fiz. In June 2021, Tyrone received the news that Kirsty had died of an aneurysm. Despite recent events he turned to a sympathetic Fiz for advice, and Tyrone and Fiz broke the news to a puzzled Ruby.

== Mandy Kamara ==
Mandy Kamara
- Coronation Street character
- Portrayed by: Pamela Nomvete
- Duration: 2012–2013
- First appearance: Episode 7955; 14 September 2012
- Last appearance: Episode 8188; 9 August 2013
- Introduced by: Phil Collinson
In-universe information
- Occupation: Pub chef and barmaid
- Husband: Johnny Kamara (backstory)
- Daughters: Jenna Kamara

Mandy Kamara, played by Pamela Nomvete, made her first on-screen appearance on 14 September 2012. The character and Nomvete's casting was announced on 26 July 2012. Nomvete was cast after an audition with Craig Charles. Mandy is Lloyd Mullaney's (Charles) ex-girlfriend and the mother of Jenna (Krissi Bohn). When Lloyd runs into Mandy by a chance encounter at a gig, she eventually reveals that Jenna is his daughter too. Series producer Phil Collinson described Mandy as "a warm and big-hearted character who has seen a lot of life and is always ready to dispense common-sense advice and wisdom." As Mandy and Jenna move to Weatherfield, Mandy finds employment as a cook at the Rovers. During an interview with Digital Spy's Daniel Kilkelly, Charles revealed that Mandy would have "a great place on the street." She becomes involved in other storylines, as well as the one with Lloyd and she eventually becomes an integral part of the street.

On 31 July 2013, Nomvete confirmed her departure from Coronation Street. Her character departed in August following "troubled times" with her rekindled relationship with Lloyd. A show spokesperson stated "Pamela's departure from the show is storyline-led and there's nothing to say that Mandy won't return to the Street in the future with familial ties remaining in Weatherfield."

At a concert in Nottingham, Lloyd bumps into an old girlfriend, Mandy. They go for a drink and get on well but when Lloyd suggests they meet up again, Mandy makes excuses. Lloyd calls at Mandy's house with a bracelet, but Mandy clearly isn't pleased to see him and after a quick cup of tea, ushers him out telling him that she'd rather forget the past. Lloyd leaves, deflated. Lloyd calls at Mandy's house again. A young girl answers the door and explains that she's Mandy's daughter, Jenna. Lloyd leaves perplexed. Mandy storms into Street Cars and tells Lloyd to stay away from her. Lloyd asks her why she lied, telling him that she didn't have any children. Mandy avoids the question, leaving Lloyd hurt and confounded. Lloyd watches Mandy's house. Upon seeing her leave, Lloyd knocks on the door. Jenna recognises him from the previous day and invites him in. Mandy arrives home and is horrified to find Lloyd in her house chatting to Jenna. Mandy's animosity towards Lloyd is evident. Jenna realises they've got history and asks them if they had an affair. Their faces say it all and the truth slowly dawns on Jenna. Lloyd and Jenna turn on Mandy demanding to know if he is her father. Mandy breaks down as Lloyd and Jenna stare at each other in shock. Mandy admits that she had an affair with Lloyd and he is in fact Jenna's biological father. Jenna's devastated to hear that the man she mourned for was not her father after all they had been through together. Mandy is furious with Lloyd for turning their lives upside down. She asks him to leave. Mandy calls in Street Cars upset and tells Lloyd how Jenna has thrown her out of the house saying that she never wants to see her again. Lloyd became worried about his daughter.

Over lunch in the flat, Lloyd and Jenna start to bond, but they're startled when Mandy calls round looking for Jenna. Refusing to see her mother, Jenna hides in the bedroom and makes Lloyd promise not to let on that he's seen her. Upon spotting Jenna's coat, Mandy realises that Lloyd is hiding her. Jenna has no choice but to reveal herself. Mandy's angry with Lloyd for lying to her and secretly meeting up with his daughter. Jenna tells Mandy that she's a rotten mother and slams out of the flat. Lloyd feels terrible. Mandy arrives at Street Cars dragging a suitcase. She explains to Lloyd that she intends to return home to Nottingham as it is clear that Jenna doesn't want her around anymore. Lloyd persuades Mandy to delay her return to Nottingham and move into his spare room for a few days and try to make it up with Jenna. Lloyd orchestrates a meeting between Mandy and Jenna, but Jenna is hostile and appalled when she discovers that Mandy's planning to live with Lloyd for a while. She accuses them of carrying on where they left off and leaves disgusted.

Mandy goes flat-hunting but with no luck. Lloyd's secretly pleased and persuades her to let him take her out for dinner. Jenna calls on Lloyd and Mandy. It is clear that she's done some thinking and when Lloyd suggests going for a Chinese, Jenna hesitatingly agrees. There's a charged moment between Lloyd and Mandy but it is ruined when Mandy gets upset realising that Jenna's not going to turn up for dinner. Lloyd tries to talk to Mandy about their relationship and their near kiss but Mandy is quick to close the conversation down and suggests that it is time she moved out. Lloyd meets up with Jenna. She apologises for letting him down the other evening but explains how it just felt wrong to go for dinner in the flat where he's living with Mandy; it felt disloyal to her dad. Lloyd's understanding and suggests they could meet up on neutral ground instead. Jenna agrees. Lloyd and Mandy wait nervously for Jenna in the café. When Jenna arrives, Lloyd breathes a sigh of relief. Jenna apologises for her behaviour and mother and daughter are reunited. Mandy thanks Lloyd for his part in helping Jenna to forgive her. She kisses him and soon their kiss becomes passionate. Jenna catches Lloyd and Mandy kissing in the street. They leap apart but Jenna assures them that she already knows about their relationship and she's cool with it. Lloyd and Mandy are delighted. Mandy offers her services to the Rovers as a chef and Stella agrees to take her on. Mandy works her first shift at the Rovers. Steve confides in Mandy that he's jealous of Rob's relationship with Michelle and worries that he'll steal her from him one day. Mandy, aware that it is only her first shift behind the bar, tactfully asks Eileen to take Jason home.

Mandy starts to have issues again with Jenna, after she comes out as lesbian and she feels gutted when Jenna begins a relationship with a much younger Sophie Webster (Brooke Vincent). After Jenna loses her job and begins working in a café, Mandy accuses Sophie of ruining her daughter's career as a physiotherapist. She soon accepts her daughter for who she is and supports her relationship. Mandy starts spending time with Lloyd and Steve at Street Cars and asks Lloyd to look after her pet tortoise, Flash. Lloyd believes he accidentally killed the tortoise, but Mandy found him alive and well on the desk. After losing her job behind the bar, Mandy begins to have doubts about her life in Weatherfield and starts looking at new houses in Nottingham. When Lloyd discovers what she is doing, she cries and admits that there is nothing left for her and that she can't see a future between them. Lloyd admits the same and agrees to end their relationship. Mandy offers Jenna the chance to move with her to Nottingham, but after looking at how well her relationship with Sophie is doing, she tells Jenna that it is best for her to stay. They say a farewell and Lloyd drives her out of the street. When Jenna leaves Weatherfield for Spain the following year, she tells Lloyd that Mandy is in another relationship.

== Jenna Kamara ==
Jenna Kamara, played by Krissi Bohn, made her first screen appearance on 19 September 2012. The character and casting was announced on 26 July 2012. Bohn joined the cast at the same time as Pamela Nomvete and like her, she was cast after an audition with Craig Charles. On 19 May 2014, it was announced that Bohn was to leave Coronation Street after her contract was not renewed. She departed on 13 August 2014. Jenna is Mandy's (Nomvete) daughter, who learns that Lloyd Mullaney (Charles) is her biological father. Series producer Phil Collinson described Jenna as being "a clever, educated young woman, whose life will be turned upside down as she struggles to come to accept Lloyd as her real father." Jenna works at the local hospital and she later moves to Weatherfield with her mother. Charles stated that Jenna is initially wary of Lloyd, after learning the man she thought was her father is not. Jenna's storyline revolves around overcoming that situation. Charles explained "So at first we're in total shock, and Jenna doesn't really take the news very well. Lloyd really doesn't want to replace Johnny, because it's 28 years later and he's missed the bike rides, teaching her to swim and all of that. Basically, he just wants a relationship where he can get to know her, and see where things go from there." Lloyd attempts to get to know Jenna better and try to make things right with her. He turns up at her place of work and she threatens to call security on him. When he returns he manages to convince her to meet him for dinner. They initially go to the Bistro, but later bond over a hotpot in the Rovers Return. An Inside Soap writer commented "As Lloyd reassures Jenna he's not out to replace the man she thinks of as her father, things begin to look up..."

== Penny Thornley ==
Penny Thornley
- Coronation Street character
- Portrayed by: Susan Hanson
- First appearance: Episode 7977; 15 October 2012
- Last appearance: Episode 7978; 19 October 2012
- Introduced by: Phil Collinson

Penny Thornley, played by Susan Hanson, made her first screen appearance on 15 October 2012. The character and casting was announced on 23 August 2012. The Daily Mirror's Steve White reported that Hanson would only be on the show for a short stint, and her character's appearance coincides with the temporary departure of Nigel Havers who plays Lewis Archer. A writer from Inside Soap later announced that Penny is a former girlfriend of Lewis and her arrival could threaten his relationship with Audrey Roberts (Sue Nicholls). A Coronation Street spokesperson commented "Penny's arrival will shine a light on Lewis and the way he used to conduct himself."

After learning that Lewis Archer has gone missing, Penny comes to Coronation Street to meet his partner, Audrey Roberts. She reveals that he disappeared shortly after seeing her and that they have unfinished business. She explains that when she knew Lewis, he was going by the name of Hugh. Penny fell in love with him and Lewis proposed, before taking £10,000 from her and disappearing.

== Carole Evans ==
Carole Evans
- Coronation Street character
- Portrayed by: Debbie Arnold
- First appearance: Episode 7989; 5 November 2012
- Last appearance: Episode 7995; 23 November 2012
- Introduced by: Phil Collinson
In-universe information
- Occupation: Landlady of The Weatherfield Arms

Carole Evans, played by Debbie Arnold, made her first screen appearance on 5 November 2012. Arnold previously appeared in Coronation Street thirty years ago as Sylvie Hicks, a girlfriend of Frank Baldwin (Sam Kydd). Arnold revealed that Carole is the landlady of The Weatherfield Arms and "an old acquaintance and sparring partner" of Stella Price (Michelle Collins). Steve Burbridge from the Sunday Sun commented that many of the landladies of the Rovers Return have had rivals from other pubs and wondered whether Carole and Stella would have the same kind of relationship. Arnold told him "If it's the same sort of relationship I'd be delighted because it was very bitchy and also very funny".

Carole used to work for Stella, until she was caught flirting with her then partner, Karl Munro (John Michie). Carole comes to The Rovers Return, where Stella now works, after learning that they have won the local Pub of the Year competition. Carole informs Stella that she is now the landlady of The Weatherfield Arms. During the presentation of the plaque, it is revealed that Stella's mother, Gloria Price (Sue Johnston), had forged some of the comment cards and the plaque is given to Carole and The Weatherfield Arms instead. Carole and Stella form rival pub football teams and during their first match, the ladies try to outdo each other.

== Others ==
Date(s)	Character	Actor	Circumstances
12–29 January	Trish Davidson	Clare Wille	Trish is a private detective hired by Frank Foster (Andrew Lancel) to follow Carla Connor (Alison King). When Trish admits she has not got anything, Frank fires her. Trish is later rehired and she follows Carla and Peter Barlow (Chris Gascoyne). Trish manages to take some photos of Carla and Peter together and presents them to Frank.
13–23 January	Billy Stratton	Wade Sayers	Billy is Danny Stratton's (Jeremy Sheffield) young son. He bonds with Danny's new girlfriend, Becky McDonald (Katherine Kelly), and they all leave for Barbados.
6 February–5 March	Jenny Sumner	Niky Wardley	Jenny meets Carla Connor (Alison King) to discuss a potential deal between their factories. Jenny admits she is aware of Carla's court case against Frank Foster (Andrew Lancel) and agrees to a deal. Jenny meets with Carla to discuss their contract, but when Frank interferes, Jenny cancels the contract. It is later revealed that Jenny and Frank are working together to get Carla to sell the factory for a low price.
13 February	Nathan	Jonathan Ojinnaka	Tommy Duckworth (Chris Fountain) sees Nathan with Kirsty Soames (Natalie Gumede) and believes they are having an affair. However, Kirsty reveals Nathan is her cousin and was helping her out with a present for Tyrone Dobbs (Alan Halsall).
20–24 February	Jodie Woodward	Gina Bramhill	Jodie brings her car to the garage on Coronation Street for Tyrone Dobbs (Alan Halsall) and Tommy Duckworth (Chris Fountain) to fix. The boys join Jodie and her friend for a drink and Tommy later kisses Jodie. Jodie leaves when Tommy reveals he does not want a proper relationship.
14 May	Carol Aldridge	Rosalind Bailey	Carol goes for dinner with Audrey Roberts (Sue Nicholls) and convinces her to judge the Weatherfield in Bloom competition.
28 May	Yvonne Perry	Dorothy Atkinson	Yvonne is Lesley Kershaw's (Judy Holt) sister. She attends Lesley's funeral.
6–13 July	Lindsay Hayward	Eleni Foskett	Lindsay is a girl in Faye Windass' (Ellie Leach) class at school who bullies her for being adopted.
6–8 July	Bully	Olivia Chester	The friend of Lindsay Hayward (Eleni Foskett) who also teases Faye Windass (Ellie Leach) for being adopted.
14 September	Cliff Pughes	Brian Miller	Cliff comes to Coronation Street looking for Gloria Price (Sue Johnston). She tells him to leave, but Gail McIntyre (Helen Worth) catches up with him and they talk. Cliff reveals that he and Gloria worked together at a dry cleaners in Spain.
5–14 December	Malcolm Lagg	Robert Fyfe	Malcolm is a school crossing patrol officer who trains Dennis Tanner (Philip Lowrie) to take over his job when he retires. When Steve McDonald (Simon Gregson) takes Dennis' sign, Malcolm calls the police and asks Dennis to identify him in The Rovers Return Inn. Steve then agrees to return the sign.
25 December	Ron Dent	Stephen Greif	Ron and Janet are Marcus Dent's (Charlie Condou) parents, who come to Coronation Street to visit their son on Christmas Day.
25 December	Janet Dent	Linda Clark	Ron and Janet are Marcus Dent's (Charlie Condou) parents, who come to Coronation Street to visit their son on Christmas Day.
