= Lewis Archer =

Fictional character in Coronation street

- Coronation Street character
- Portrayed by: Nigel Havers
- Duration: 2009–2010, 2012–2013, 2018–2019
- First appearance: Episode 7232; 18 December 2009
- Last appearance: Episode 9654; 1 January 2019
- Introduced by: Kim Crowther (2009); Phil Collinson (2012); Kate Oates (2018)
In-universe information
- Occupation: Male escort Waiter

Lewis Archer is a fictional character from the British ITV soap opera Coronation Street, played by Nigel Havers. The character was created and introduced as a love interest for Audrey Roberts (Sue Nicholls). Executive producer Kim Crowther revealed the team wanted an actor who was slightly younger than Audrey and who was very charming. Various actors were considered for the part, but the casting director suggested Havers as she knew he was a big fan of the show. The actor said he could not turn down a chance to appear in Coronation Street as his character had an interesting story arc. Havers was contracted until July 2010 and he made his debut as Lewis in the episode broadcast on 18 December 2009.

Lewis is a gentleman escort, who is described as being suave, charming and charismatic. He is first seen accompanying Claudia Colby (Rula Lenska) to a Christmas ball. He is introduced to Audrey, who falls for his charm and later hires him to be her companion to another event. In March 2010, Lewis was seen advertising his services in The Lady, as part of a crossover between the society magazine and Coronation Street. Rita Tanner (Barbara Knox) sees the advert and books Lewis for a date, forming a love triangle storyline between them and Audrey. Lewis eventually declares his feelings for Audrey, and they plan to leave Weatherfield together.

As their plans to emigrate step up a gear, Lewis forges a plan to steal money from Peter Barlow's (Chris Gascoyne) betting shop by cashing fraudulently franked betting slips. His scam is successful, and he cheats on Audrey when he kisses Deirdre Barlow (Anne Kirkbride). Lewis flees the country; he made his last appearance on 13 August 2010. Just over a year later, it was announced Havers would reprise his role as Lewis full-time, and return to Coronation Street in February 2012. Havers believed Lewis would be a changed man who wanted to apologise to those he had hurt. The character's first period in the show was well received by television critics. On 22 January 2013, it was announced that Havers would be leaving Coronation Street once again and Lewis departed on 1 February 2013. Five years later, it was announced that Lewis would be reintroduced to the series full-time, and he returned on 1 June 2018. The character was killed off on 1 January 2019.

== Creation and casting ==
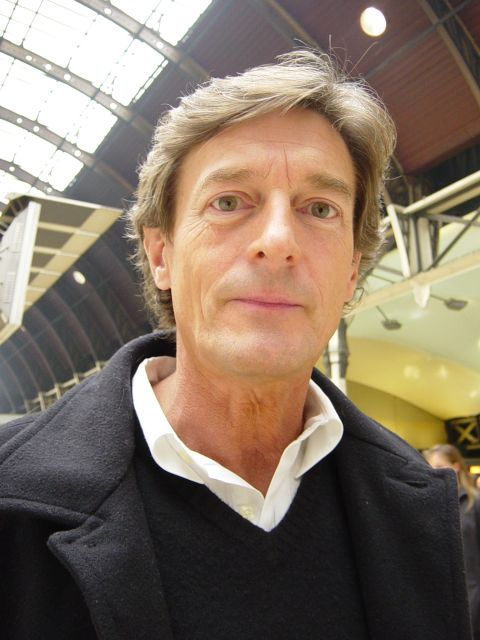
Nigel Havers (pictured) was cast as Lewis in 2009.

On 14 October 2009, Daniel Kilkelly of Digital Spy announced Havers had joined the cast of Coronation Street as Lewis, a potential love interest for Audrey Roberts (Sue Nicholls). A writer for What's on TV said Havers was to make a one-off appearance in December before continuing in the role throughout 2010. The show's executive producer, Kim Crowther, told Gareth McLean of the Radio Times that while the team was planning the Audrey and Lewis storyline, they decided they wanted to introduce someone who was very charming, and slightly younger than Audrey. Casting director June West considered various actors for the part, including Anthony Head, but she suggested Havers for the role as she knew he was a big fan of the show. Crowther quipped, "When you think of Nigel, you think of someone suave enough to charm you out of your high heels. Half the work is done." Havers said he could not refuse the part because his character was fascinating and had an interesting story arc, and that being on the show had always been his ambition. Havers was initially contracted until July 2010 and he made his debut screen appearance as Lewis on 18 December 2009. In March 2010, Havers stated that he was keen to renew his contract, as he was enjoying his time with the soap.

== Development ==
=== Characterisation and Audrey Roberts ===
Gareth McLean of the Radio Times said that Lewis was a gentleman escort and he deemed him a "suave companion." A spokeswoman for the show said, "There is no suggestion that Lewis is anything more than a companion escort for his clients." A writer for the Metro described Lewis as "charming" and "charismatic", and a reporter from the Daily Record wrote that he was "Weatherfield's answer to American Gigolo." The soap's official website lists "ungallant behaviour" as something Lewis dislikes. Havers believed Lewis would eventually display "a real dark side", though he was unaware of what that could be. Lewis is first seen accompanying Claudia Colby (Rula Lenska) to a Christmas ball. He is introduced by Audrey Roberts; Digital Spy's Daniel Kilkelly stated that she was "immediately bowled over by his charming ways." Claudia informs Audrey that she booked Lewis through an agency and Audrey decides to hire Lewis to be her companion to another event. Lewis goes to the Rovers Return Inn and pretends not to know Audrey. He then proceeds to chat her up in front of her friends, causing them to wonder how she attracted him. Havers thought the scenes were funny and called the storyline between Lewis and Audrey "fantastic". In March 2010, Lewis was seen advertising his escort service in society magazine, The Lady. A reporter for The Belfast Telegraph revealed the character's classified advert would be seen in the real life magazine in a crossover with the show. A spokeswoman for Coronation Street stated "The Lady heard the magazine was going to feature in an episode, and they approached us with the idea of using the advert in the actual magazine." In the advert, Lewis claims to have "years of experience" and is "suitable to accompany ladies in any social or corporate event". On screen, Audrey's friend Rita Tanner (Barbara Knox) notices the advert and books Lewis for a date.

"All along Lewis has played a very straight act to Audrey and she hasn't seen any of his shiftiness. He is very attentive, he listens to her, he's very sweet and loving and always says the right things."

— Sue Nicholls on Lewis (2010)

A love triangle storyline between Audrey, Rita and Lewis then formed and was played out over Easter 2010. Rita hires Lewis to accompany her to a ball, despite knowing that her friend has fallen for him. Audrey becomes jealous when she tries to book Lewis herself and he explains someone has already hired him. Audrey attends the ball with a friend and is shocked to see Rita with Lewis. The two women insult each other and Lewis and Rita leave. Susan Hill, writing for the Daily Star said that despite Lewis' apology for attending an event with Rita, Audrey is furious and confronts her friend. Rita tells Audrey she is "acting like an old fool as Lewis can never be hers" and Audrey slaps Rita across the face. Of Lewis' view of the situation, Havers commented, "I think Lewis is genuinely concerned about Audrey. When Rita gets involved, he has to box clever, but he's very good at that." Audrey decides to stop all contact with Lewis after realising she has fallen in love with him. Audrey's decision is prompted by her falling out with Rita and the fact she has read Lewis' diary, which contains details about his clients. Not wanting to get hurt by him, Audrey tells Lewis that she wants end their arrangement. Lewis is shocked and cannot understand why Audrey would want to stop seeing him. A show spokesperson commented, "In the end she has to come clean and tell him how she really feels – which prompts Lewis to kiss her. He then tells her he's developed feelings for her too." Audrey is shocked by the kiss and Lewis' declaration of love.

As their relationship progresses, Audrey invites Lewis to move in with her. Nicholls told Suzanne Byrne of RTÉ Ten that Lewis appears to brush Audrey off, before eventually agreeing to move in. Nicholls said, "And then in his usual charming style he brings her breakfast in bed on her birthday, which she adores him for. He's clever like that, he knows how to bring the balance back to the relationship." In May 2010, the Daily Mirror's Brian Roberts reported that a new plot for Audrey and Lewis could see them leaving Weatherfield for a new life in Greece. The couple go on holiday to a Greek island and Audrey is taken with Lewis' idea of opening a hotel and living a glamorous life out there. Roberts likened the plot development to that of the 1989 film, Shirley Valentine. Roz Laws of the Sunday Mercury noted that Lewis seemed uncomfortable with the plan; Nicholls said that Audrey is unaware of his doubts. Laws also compared the plot to a similar one in another ITV soap opera, Emmerdale, involving Diane Sugden (Elizabeth Estensen) and Charlie Haynes (George Costigan), and predicted that both storylines would end in heartache. Nicholls wanted Audrey and Lewis to leave together and have a happy ending, and wanted to see a spin-off series focusing on the pair and their new life in Greece. Olivia Buxton from the Daily Mirror questioned whether Lewis would go through with the plan; she wrote that two endings to his story arc had been filmed, one of which showed him making a dramatic exit.

=== Departure (2010) ===
Lewis departed the show on 13 August 2010. In his exit storyline, he leaves the UK after stealing a large sum of money from Peter Barlow's (Chris Gascoyne) betting shop. Lewis carries out his plan to place fraudulently franked betting slips in the till while Audrey arranges to have her money transferred into a bank account for them to purchase their hotel. On the day of their farewell party in the Rovers, Lewis slips out to collect his money from the betting shop and kisses employee Deirdre Barlow (Anne Kirkbride) when she becomes suspicious about his motives for being in the shop. Kate Woodward, writing for Inside Soap, said while Deirdre is attracted to Lewis, she ends their kiss and tells him to return to the party. However, Lewis flees the country, but decides not to take Audrey's money as well and he writes her a letter ending their relationship. While he is at an airport, Lewis meets businesswoman Lydia Radcliffe played by Lysette Anthony, who filmed her one-off appearance in June. Daniel Kilkelly (Digital Spy) reported that Lewis would "quickly woo Lydia with chat-up lines" and they leave for Barbados together.

=== Reintroduction (2012) ===
Havers returned to Coronation Street on 17 February 2012. While appearing on Loose Women the previous year, Havers revealed that he had been in talks with Coronation Street producers about a return to the show. He stated that he had adored his role as Lewis and that he had to return and apologise to Audrey. Later that year, ITV announced that Havers would return to Coronation Street in 2012 to reprise his role as Lewis. Series producer Phil Collinson said that Havers had started filming his scenes in January 2012 and he would return on-screen from February. Collinson also said that Lewis would have a lot of ground to cover to win Audrey back, that the character is "a great hoot" and that it was wonderful to have Havers back. Peter Dyke and Katie Begley of the Daily Star wrote that Lewis' return storyline would show Audrey and her daughter, Gail Platt (Helen Worth), unexpectedly meeting Lewis at a country pub. Havers told Allison Jones of Inside Soap that Lewis then tries to convince them he is his own twin brother, Hugh. Havers said, "Audrey is totally floored to see him again — as you can imagine. And if I said that Gail is angry when they bump into Lewis, it would be a massive understatement!" Lewis begs Audrey and Gail not to call the police and he decides to return to Weatherfield.

Havers said Lewis was a changed man who wanted to apologise to those he had hurt and to make amends. He said, "There's always that danger Lewis could fall back into his old ways, and he is down to his last penny. But at the moment, Lewis is trying his hardest and has no ulterior motive — just an awful lot of ice to break instead!" Lewis returns the money he took from Peter, adding an extra thousand pounds as compensation. Havers said that Lewis feels desperately bad about what he did. Upon entering the Rovers, Lewis is punched by Deirdre. Havers stated that Lewis wants Audrey to forgive him and give him a second chance. Lewis finds Audrey charming and honest and he likes being mothered by her to an extent. Havers said that Lewis did fall in love with Audrey while they were together, but no one believes him as he has told so many lies, and thought Lewis' one redeeming feature was not taking Audrey's money when he had the chance. Havers added, "He's been feeling terrible because he did the dirty on her and he wants to make amends."

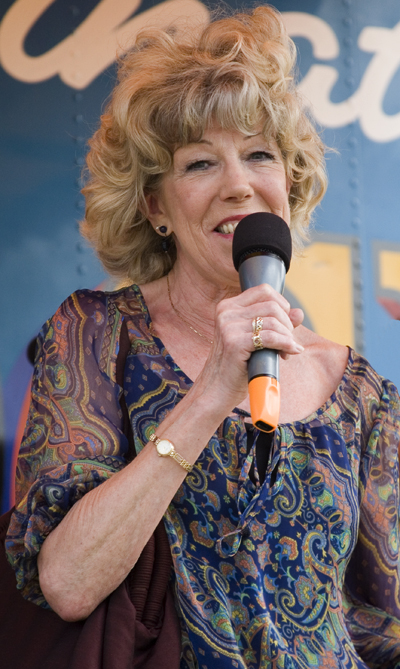
Sue Nicholls (pictured) believed that Audrey could be making a mistake by reuniting with Lewis.

Lewis' presence on the Street infuriates Gail, who still holds a grudge for the way he treated Audrey. Gail hopes Lewis may have left for good when he attends court on charges of fraud. However, Lewis charms the judge with a speech about the way he let Audrey down, and he is sentenced to community service. The animosity between Gail and Lewis, reaches a peak at The Bistro; and as Audrey defends Lewis, a food critic from the Weatherfield Gazette walks in. A show spokesperson told Inside Soap's Katy Moon that Lewis turns on the charm and quickly wins the reviewer over. Audrey's grandson Nick Tilsley (Ben Price), who owns The Bistro, realises Lewis' communication skills could be good for his business and he employs Lewis for a trial period at the restaurant.

=== Reuniting with Audrey ===
Lewis and Audrey decide to rekindle their relationship in March 2012. Kate White from Inside Soap wrote that Audrey finds Lewis hard to resist, especially after he has apologised for his previous actions. When Lewis is wrongly accused of taking some money from The Bistro, he plans to leave Weatherfield. Nicholls told White that Audrey feels awful that she too accused Lewis and it is a wake up call for her as she does trust him. The actress said Audrey still fancies Lewis and does not want to lose him again. Lewis and Audrey spend the night together and decide to keep their relationship a secret, especially from Audrey's family, as his "past indiscretions still loom over them like a dark cloud". Nicholls said Audrey could be making a mistake, and added, "You read this sort of thing in the papers all the time, women of a certain age being charmed by these men. I'd ask her to think about what she's doing." A writer for Inside Soap said that Audrey and Lewis are very happy as they "bask in the warmth of their revived romance." However, they have to resort to sneaky measures to spend time together to avoid upsetting Audrey's family. When Audrey calls in sick at the salon to spend time with Lewis, Gail and David become concerned and check up on her. They see Lewis leaving her house and realise the pair are back together.

Lewis and Audrey decide to go on holiday together and Lewis offers to pay for himself. Digital Spy's Daniel Kilkelly wrote that Lewis' renewed relationship with Audrey and their plans to go on a round-the-world cruise would cause a feud between her and David. Audrey's money is tied up in the salon, so she asks David to sign it back to her so she can pay for the holiday. However, David refuses to sign the salon back as he thinks Lewis might be planning another fraud. Kilkelly said Lewis tries to play peacemaker and suggests postponing the trip until he can save the money himself, but Audrey insists David will co-operate and she tears up their contract.

=== Departure (2013) ===
On 22 January 2013, Kilkelly confirmed that Havers would leave Coronation Street following the conclusion to the Lewis and Gail storyline on 1 February. The scenes lead to Lewis' departure from Weatherfield, but Kilkelly commented that "fans will have to wait and see whether Gail loses everything thanks to Lewis". The door was left open by producers if Havers wanted to reprise the role of Lewis again in the future.

=== Second reintroduction and death (2018–2019) ===
In February 2017, Havers told Piers Morgan on his show, Piers Morgan's Life Stories, that he wanted to return to Coronation Street. He called his experience on the serial "wonderful" and stated that he wanted to repay Gail her money. On 20 March 2018, it was announced that Havers would be reprising his role, after a five-year absence from the show. Lewis returns in a comedic storyline involving Audrey. The character was reintroduced on 1 June 2018, and shown to be working with clairvoyant Rosemary Piper (Sophie Thompson) to con Gail out of her money.

In October 2018, it was announced that Lewis would be leaving the serial in early 2019, after being killed-off. During the New Year's Day episode broadcast on 1 January 2019, the character died in a "shock" storyline. Lewis asks Audrey to meet him at the Bistro, but when he fails to turn up, she and Gail assume that he has fled town. However, when Audrey returns home, she finds Lewis' body in her bedroom, and sees that he is holding an engagement ring. Mayer Nissim of Digital Spy reported that some viewers were struggling to believe that Lewis was really dead, and when one of them wondered if it was a scam, Nissim added to the speculation by writing "surely not..."

== Storylines ==
=== 2009–2010 ===
Lewis is hired by Claudia Colby (Rula Lenska) to accompany her to the Weatherfield Traders' Association Christmas party. Claudia introduces Lewis to her friend, Audrey Roberts (Sue Nicholls), and he flirts with her. Audrey learns Lewis is a male escort and she later hires him to be her date for the Stylists' Dinner. Audrey contacts Lewis again and invites him to have dinner with her, but she becomes apprehensive and pretends to be ill when he arrives. Lewis persuades Audrey to let him into her home and he listens while she talks about her late husband. They then go out for dinner. Lewis visits The Rovers Return in Coronation Street and pretends not to know Audrey. Norris Cole (Malcolm Hebden) recognises Lewis from the Christmas party and when he sees Lewis kissing Audrey, he jumps to the conclusion that they are having an affair.

Rita Sullivan (Barbara Knox) contacts Lewis and they attend the theatre together. Lewis charms Rita and she books him for the Chamber of Commerce Easter Dinner Dance. Lewis is surprised when Audrey turns up at the dance with Claudia. Audrey becomes jealous of Rita, and the women insult each other until Lewis intervenes. Lewis leaves his diary containing his clients' details in Audrey's salon. When he returns to collect it, he finds Audrey has read it. Audrey tells Lewis that they cannot continue to be together, but Lewis kisses Audrey and tells her he has feelings for her. They begin dating, despite Rita telling Audrey it will end in tears. After noticing Audrey is not happy with his occupation, Lewis quits and tells Audrey that he is beginning to feel too old for the job. Audrey invites Lewis to move in with her; and although he hesitates at first, Lewis eventually accepts.

Lewis and Audrey go on holiday to Greece together and Lewis suggests they move there and open a hotel. Audrey agrees and gets a £100,000 loan towards the purchase of the hotel. Lewis, needing money of his own, decides to steal from Peter Barlow's (Chris Gascoyne) betting shop with fraudulently franked betting slips. He begins flirting with Deirdre Barlow (Anne Kirkbride), Peter's stepmother and an employee at the betting shop. Lewis sends Deirdre out of the shop to get a corkscrew so they can share a bottle of wine. He places his fraudulent betting slips in the till and when Deirdre returns, he kisses her to distract her. Lewis slips out of Audrey's farewell party to collect his money and he leaves for the airport. Peter discovers Lewis has stolen from him and Audrey is devastated by his disappearance. She discovers Lewis has left her money alone and she finds a photograph of them with the words, "I tried", written on the back. While he is in the airport bar waiting for his flight to Barbados, Lewis introduces himself to a glamorous woman, Lydia Radcliffe (Lysette Anthony), and offers to sit with her during the flight.

=== 2012–2013 ===
Over a year later, Lewis enters a country pub and unexpectedly meets Audrey and her daughter, Gail McIntyre (Helen Worth). Upon seeing them, he pretends he is his own identical twin brother. Neither Audrey or Gail are fooled and Lewis offers to pay for their drinks. He then leaves the pub and heads to Coronation Street. Lewis visits Peter, apologises for stealing from him and returns the money he took with an extra £1000 as compensation. Lewis then goes to Audrey's salon and he tells her he did not mean to hurt her. He asks Audrey to drive him to the police station to prove how sorry he is. After he is given bail, Lewis enters the Rovers Return and is punched by Deirdre. Lewis faces hostility from Audrey's grandson, David Platt (Jack P. Shepherd) upon his return to the salon. He begs Audrey for forgiveness but she throws him out. Lewis sends her flowers and Audrey visits his address and finds he is living in a bedsit. David's wife, Kylie (Paula Lane), introduces herself to Lewis and he defends her against Brian Packham's (Peter Gunn) accusations that she is giving her son the wrong food.

Lewis attends court, where he is found guilty and sentenced to perform forty hours community service. While dining at The Bistro, Lewis charms a food critic and Nick Tilsley (Ben Price) offers him a two-week trial as head waiter. Gail disapproves but Audrey defends Lewis and he later buys Audrey a bracelet as a gift of thanks. When Nick finds some money missing from the till, he and Gail believe Lewis took it. Audrey also doubts Lewis but when she learns that Eva Price (Catherine Tyldesley) took the money, she tries unsuccessfully to stop Lewis from leaving. Lewis returns for his wages and tells Nick that his community service has finished and he is leaving for good. Audrey arrives to see Lewis, asks him to stay and professes her love for him. They spend the night together at Audrey's house and agree to keep their relationship secret. Once David and Gail find out about their relationship, Audrey and Lewis make it public. Lewis suggests they go on holiday together to the Mediterranean and Audrey agrees. She asks David to sign her salon back to her so she can help pay for the holiday, but he refuses.

Audrey and David begin feuding over the rights to the salon and Lewis notices that the arguing is taking its toll on Audrey's health. He suggests they go to Wales for a few days instead. When Audrey serves David with an injunction to try and reclaim her business, an argument breaks out and Audrey suffers a heart attack. Lewis comforts Audrey until the ambulance arrives and stays with her at the hospital. Lewis and Audrey go on holiday. On her return, Audrey reveals to her family that Lewis disappeared from the Eurostar on the way home. Lewis later turns up at the salon to see Audrey and explains that he disappeared because he saw Penny Thornley (Susan Hanson), a woman he once conned. Lewis asks Audrey to run away with him and she agrees. While they are packing, Audrey's family and Penny arrive. Penny reveals that she is going to call the police, but Audrey stops her and gives her the money Lewis took. When Nick refuses to give Lewis his job back, Gloria Price (Sue Johnston) hires him to work at The Rovers Return.

Gloria confides in Lewis that she is dying and he provides her with support. When she asks him to run away with her, he turns her down and tells her he loves Audrey. Lewis then learns that Gloria is not ill and she and Gail were testing his loyalty to Audrey. Lewis is outraged when he realises Audrey knew what was going on and breaks up with her. He then gets revenge on Gloria by revealing that she has cheated in the local pub of the year competition. Lewis gets his job back at The Bistro and he moves into a flat on Victoria Street. Lewis begins to formulate a plan to get back at Gail for ruining his relationship with Audrey. He decides to use her guilt against her. One night at the Bistro, he pretends to slip and hurt his back. Gail takes pity on Lewis and allows him to stay with her, whilst she cares for him. During his time with Gail, Lewis offers her his support and advice about her problems. Lewis is not happy when he sees Audrey on a date with another man.

While sharing a bottle of wine with Gail, Lewis tries to kiss her. He later introduces her to his friend, Patrick (Simon Rouse), and pretends to turn down a job opportunity in Tuscany, Italy because he loves her. Lewis pays Patrick for his help and tells him that Gail ruined his life, so he is going to do the same to her. Lewis and Gail grow closer and begin dating in secret, although Lewis resists taking things further because of his feelings for Audrey. Lewis attempts to drive a wedge between Gail and her family, before telling her that he has been offered a new life in Italy, running a small hotel. Lewis asks Gail to come with him and she agrees. Audrey is devastated when she learns about their relationship, after catching them together. Gail takes out a £40,000 loan against her house to fund her move to Italy, which Lewis plans on taking. He overhears Kylie speaking about a one-night stand she had with Nick and blackmails her into getting Gail's bank account password for him. Gail gathers her family together to tell them about her new life in Italy, but Lewis does not turn up. He instructs them by text message to watch a DVD he has made detailing his revenge plan. He reveals that he has taken Gail's money and that he deeply loved Audrey. He also sends Audrey £9,000 by courier to repay the money she gave to Penny. The police later inform Gail that Lewis has fled to Belize, and would be unable to be extradited to the UK, even if he was caught.

=== 2018–2019 ===
Five years later, Lewis has returned to the UK, and is revealed to be in cahoots with Rosemary Piper (Sophie Thompson), a supposed clairvoyant; who has told Gail that her family has been cursed by her serial killer husband, Richard Hillman (Brian Capron). After learning that David was raped by Josh Tucker (Ryan Clayton), Gail calls Rosemary and tells her she wants to get rid of the curse immediately, even though it will be expensive. Lewis is seen sitting in Rosemary's car listening to the conversation. During a public session attended by Audrey and Gail, Lewis and Rosemary are thwarted by Roy Cropper (David Neilson) and Cathy Matthews (Melanie Hill) when they discover that Lewis is feeding information about the people's families through an ear-set to Rosemary. Both Gail and Audrey are shocked to see Lewis and whilst Roy and Cathy chase after Rosemary who has fled, Gail goes to get her phone to call the police. Left alone with Audrey, Lewis manipulates her into letting him go and he disappears until over a month later. After sending Gail her money back, he hands himself into the police and sends Audrey a visiting order. She visits Lewis inside and when he tells her that he'll be released soon, he asks her to meet up. Believing Lewis to be a changed man, Audrey agrees and they eventually decide to get back together. When Gail finds out, she furiously asks Audrey to choose between her and Lewis and when she chooses the latter, Gail disowns her mother.

Lewis spends the next few months happily with Audrey. He is forgiven by most of her family and the Street residents, much to his delight and Gail's chagrin. On the run up to Christmas, Lewis attends the funeral of one of Audrey's old friends, Archie Shuttleworth (Roy Hudd), with her, Rita and Ken Barlow (William Roache). Audrey is shocked to discover that Archie left her £80,000 which gets notable interest from Lewis. Nick is concerned that Lewis won't be able to help himself and even Audrey has her doubts. Despite this, Lewis gains back Audrey's trust when he promises he loves her and doesn't want her windfall. On Christmas Day, Lewis enjoys the morning with the Platt family and later, during a meal, he has a heart to heart with everyone present where he thanks everyone for their forgiveness and emotionally states that having a family is better than any "dirty money". The family toast to him just as a shocked Gail returns from Milan.

During Boxing Day, Gail overhears Lewis telling a woman on the phone that he is looking suspicious. The next day, Gail makes peace with Lewis which pleases him greatly. Unbeknownst to him, Gail only does this in order to gain access to his diary. Spotting an unusual appointment, she follows Lewis to a hotel and spies on him with another woman. She tries to warn Audrey who refuses to believe her. Audrey later confronts a stunned Lewis who defiantly denies any other woman and asserts his love for Audrey which once again regains her trust. However, when Lewis goes to run an errand on New Year's Eve and is much later than he said he would be, Audrey finally buys into Gail's claims and tells him that he has blown his last chance. Lewis confronts Gail in her garden as the New Year arrives and issues a threat to her.

After Lewis begs Audrey for forgiveness, she agrees to meet him in the Bistro. He promises Audrey that he hasn't turned back to his old ways and that everything will be revealed that night. When he fails to turn up, Audrey returns home with Gail who is convinced that Lewis has fled after stealing the money. However, Audrey finds that Lewis has died from a heart attack, while he was preparing to propose to her. Lewis had previously said that he had been at the doctors after having chest pains which Audrey had dismissed as a lie. Audrey is heartbroken and, realising that Gail's constant accusations led to his death, tells her to leave. Audrey finds out the next day that £80,000 has been taken from her bank account. She is told by the police that there are photos of a woman taking out large amounts of money from various cashpoints. Audrey's family assume that Lewis is to blame and Audrey remembers that he helped her open the account and would have known her password. Audrey breaks down over Lewis's betrayal and interrupts his funeral whilst Claudia is reading his eulogy, accusing her of having a part in the scam. Later, it is revealed that Nick had secretly stole the money, proving that Lewis truly was a changed man.

Months later, the truth is revealed and both Nick and David, who found out about the scheme and joined Nick, are disowned by the family. Audrey is devastated over her grandsons' betrayal, and that she did not get to say a proper goodbye to Lewis. She later visits Lewis' grave and lays flowers, telling him she will always love him.

== Reception ==
A writer for the Liverpool Daily Post wrote, "Since Lewis (Nigel Havers) waltzed into the street, things with the over fifty club (Rita, Audrey and now Deirdre) haven't been the same." Steve Pratt, writing for The Northern Echo, said, "As love rat scumbags go, Lewis Archer is up there with that chap who tried to push Rita under a tram in Blackpool." In 2010, Dan Martin from The Guardian speculated that Lewis – who he called "the Nigel Havers gigolo" – could be one of the characters to be killed-off in the soap's 50th anniversary special, as he believed that the "primary function of a big soap disaster is to sweep out the dead wood", and that Lewis was one of the "characters we don't care about even if we noticed they were there".

Sue Crawford of the Daily Mirror said, "playing a ladies' man comes naturally to Nigel Havers so it's hardly surprising he's playing a flirt in Coronation Street." Crawford's colleague, Simon Boyle, wrote that Lewis was "charming but devious." Havers' role in the soap proved popular with female viewers. The actor told entertainment website Digital Spy that he had been sent sackfuls of fan mail and underwear. However, other viewers were unhappy with Havers' character's treatment of Audrey and the actor received abuse in the street. In November 2011, Jon Horsley of Yahoo! said viewers should be excited about Lewis' return to Coronation Street. Horsely added "It'll be great to see the old smoothy back on the cobbles. We're really looking forward to Audrey's reaction to him, too." Lewis' return to Coronation Street was selected for Digital Spy's Picture of the Day feature.

In 2013, Havers won Best Exit at The British Soap Awards for his portrayal of Lewis. He was also nominated for Villain of the Year.
