= David Lonsdale =

English actor (born 1963)

- Born: 21 May 1963 (age 63); Southport, Lancashire, England
- Education: King George V College Guildhall School of Music and Drama
- Occupation: Actor
- Years active: 1986–present
- Spouse: Diane Lonsdale (m. 1993)
- Children: 3

David Lonsdale (born 21 May 1963) is an English actor. He is best known for playing David Stockwell in the ITV period police drama series Heartbeat.

== Career ==
=== Television ===
Lonsdale's first major role on television occurred in 1986 when he played Peter Barlow in Coronation Street. He has subsequently re-appeared in the show on two occasions: he first returned in 2011 in a minor role working for a solicitor, and again in May 2012, this time playing Edwin Soames.

Other, more minor television appearances, have seen Lonsdale take roles in the 1989 Inspector Morse episode Driven to Distraction, in which he played a detective; in the medical drama Casualty (2011); and in the soap opera Emmerdale (2018), in which he played a private detective.

Lonsdale has also twice appeared in the drama series Vera. His first appearance was in the role of a policeman; he later played pub landlord Phil Annerly in the episode "Dirty" (2020). Furthermore, he has appeared in The Bay (2022), in the ITV drama series Anne and as a Catholic priest who hears the confession of disgraced television personality Jimmy Savile in the BBC's four-part drama The Reckoning (2023).

=== Film ===
Lonsdale had a minor role as a repo man in the 1997 feature film The Full Monty. In 2019, he appeared as a desk sergeant in the movie Downton Abbey.

=== Theatre ===
Lonsdale appeared in the pantomime Dick Whittington at the Gracie Fields Theatre, Rochdale, in 2018–2019. In recent years, he has played the part of Gordon Bennett in Uncle Eric musical comedy plays at the New Vic Theatre in Newcastle-under-Lyme.

== Personal life ==
Lonsdale married his wife, Diane, in 1993. Together, they have three children.

He presents a Sunday morning show, The Southport Arts Show, on community radio station Mighty FM. Lonsdale is a regular guest at the annual Heartbeat Car Rally in Goathland, where he spends time meeting and greeting fans, usually with his co-star Tricia Penrose.

== Filmography ==
=== Film ===
Year	Title	Role	Notes
1989	Bert Rigby, You're a Fool	Minor Role	Uncredited
1989	Resurrected	Hibbert	
1997	The Full Monty	Repossession Man	
2014	Tariro	Joe	
2019	Downton Abbey	Police Sergeant	

=== Television ===
Year	Title	Role	Notes
1986	Coronation Street	Peter Barlow	8 episodes
1987	Rockliffe	PC Tibbett	Episode: "In the Bag"
1987	Bust	Car Hire Assistant	Episode: "Hidden Assets"
1988	Dramarama	Mike Lovell	Episode: "Forever Young"
1990	Inspector Morse	Detective	Episode: "Driven to Distraction"
1990	The Bill	Sgt. Hallett	Episode: "A Clean Division"
1993–2009	Heartbeat	David Stockwell	259 episodes
1994	Moving Story	Police Constable	Episode: "Moving Story"
1994	The Bill	D.C. Gelder	Episode: "Bridgework"
1995	The Chief	Det. Sgt. Bennet	Episode: #5.7
2003	The Royal	David Stockwell	2 episodes
2011–2012	Coronation Street	Edwin Soames	7 episodes
2011	Casualty	Billy Waite	Episode: "Natural Selection"
2014	Doctors	Charlie Marshell	Episode: "Two Little Boys"
2014	Hollyoaks	Mr. Philpot	2 episodes
2018	The Innocents	Barman	Episode: "The Start of Us"
2018	Press	Geoff Newman	Episode: "Don't Take My Heart, Don't Break My Heart"
2018	Emmerdale	Glen	3 episodes
2020	Vera	Phil Annerly	Episode: "Dirty"
2020	Anthony	Train Guard	TV film
2021	The Bay	Gary	Episode: #2.5
2022	Anne	Senior Officer	Episode: #1.2
2022	The Thief, His Wife and the Canoe	Les Dolding	Episode: #1.2
2022	The Suspect	Engineer	Episode: #1.3
2023	The Reckoning	Catholic Priest	Episode: 1.#3
