= Natalie Gumede =

English actress

- Born: 20 March 1984 (age 42); Burnley, Lancashire, England
- Education: Italia Conti Academy of Theatre Arts
- Occupation: Actress
- Television: Ideal; Coronation Street; Strictly Come Dancing; Jekyll & Hyde; Free Rein

Natalie Gumede (born 20 March 1984) is an English actress. She is known for playing Kirsty Soames in the ITV soap opera, Coronation Street, from 2011 to 2013. She previously played China in BBC Three comedy show Ideal. She has also appeared in The Persuasionists, Emmerdale and Doctor Who among other television shows. Gumede was also runner-up in the 2013 series of Strictly Come Dancing on BBC One. From 2017 to 2019, Gumede began appearing in Netflix original Free Rein as Maggie Steel Phillips.

== Early life ==
Gumede was born in Burnley, Lancashire and lived in Colne during her early life, attending first Christ Church C of E Primary School and then Park High School. Her father is Zimbabwean and her mother is English. Her grandfather Josiah Gumede was the only President of the short-lived Zimbabwe Rhodesia. At the age of 11 while attending Pendle Hippodrome Youth Theatre, she was picked by BBC producers to help present the north-west regional insert for Children in Need in 1995. From aged 4 to eleven, Gumede attended the Chippendale School of Dancing in Colne, and later furthered her arts career at the Italia Conti Academy of Theatre Arts.

== Career ==
From 2004 until 2007, Gumede played China in the dark-comedy sitcom series, Ideal, who along with her friend Asia (Rebecca Atkinson), was one of Moz's regular clients. Her character featured in the pilot episode, and was a regular in the first three series. In 2008, she featured in her first full-length film, Clubbed, a British drama about a 1980s factory worker who takes up a job as a club doorman. In 2005, Gumede made a guest appearance in the ITV soap opera, Emmerdale, portraying Tania Coles. In 2010, Gumede featured in the sitcom The Persuasionists, broadcast on BBC Two, set in the world of advertising, starring Iain Lee, Simon Farnaby, Adam Buxton, Jarred Christmas and Daisy Haggard.

In September 2011, Gumede made her first appearance in the ITV soap opera, Coronation Street, portraying Kirsty Soames, who became the domestic abusive love interest to mechanic Tyrone Dobbs (Alan Halsall). She had previously tried out for the part of Kelly Crabtree, but lost out to Tupele Dorgu. For her portrayal of the character, Gumede had received the Best Newcomer accolade at the 2012 British Soap Awards. She was later nominated for Best Soap Newcomer at the TV Choice Awards and voted Most Popular Newcomer during the 18th National Television Awards. In Digital Spy's end of year reader poll, Kirsty's domestic abuse storyline with on-screen boyfriend Tyrone won Best Storyline with 28.3% of the vote. On 21 February 2013, it was announced that she would leave the soap after a year-and-a-half, and departed when her character, Kirsty, went to prison on 3 April 2013. In June 2021, her character was revealed to have died from an aneurysm.

In 2015, she played the role of Bella in the ITV series Jekyll & Hyde.

=== Strictly Come Dancing ===
In 2013, Gumede was a runner-up on the eleventh series of Strictly Come Dancing. Her professional partner was the eighth series champion, Artem Chigvintsev. They quickly became the early favourites for the title after a strong start. In the Final, she lost out to Abbey Clancy & Aljaz Skorjanec and came joint second along with Susanna Reid & Kevin Clifton.

Week #	Dance/Song	Judges' scores					Result
Week #	Dance/Song	Horwood	Bussell	Goodman	Tonioli	Total	Result
1	Cha-cha-cha / "Rasputin"	8	8	8	7	31	No elimination
2	Waltz / "If I Ain't Got You"	8	9	8	9	34	Safe
3	Rumba / "Love the Way You Lie (Part II)"	9	9	9	9	36	Safe
4	Quickstep / "Yeah!"	9	9	8	9	35	Safe
5	Samba / "Bamboléo"	8	9	9	9	35	Safe
6	Viennese waltz / "Devil in Me"	9	10	9	10	38	Safe
8	Charleston / "Bang Bang"	9	10	10	10	39	Safe
9	Tango / "Where Have You Been"	9	9	9	10	37	Safe
10	American Smooth / "And I Am Telling You I'm Not Going"	9	9	8	10	36	Safe
11	Paso doble / "El Gato Montes"	9	9	8	9	35	Safe
12	Salsa / "Wanna Be Startin' Somethin'"; Argentine tango / "Montserrat"	10; 9	10; 9	10; 10	10; 10	40; 38	Bottom two
13	Cha-cha-cha / "Rasputin"; Freestyle / "Steppin' Out with My Baby"; American Smooth / "And I Am Telling You I'm Not Going"	9; 10; 10	10; 10; 10	10; 10; 10	10; 10; 10	39; 40; 40	Runner-up

== Filmography ==
Year	Title	Role	Notes
2004	Von Trapped	Madison Avenue	Television film
2005–2007, 2010	Ideal	China	Series regular
2005	Emmerdale	Tania Coles	2 episodes
2005	Wire in the Blood	Hotel Receptionist	1 episode
2006	Doctors	Jenny Benjamin	2 episodes
2008	Clubbed	Jo	Film
2009	Doctors	Celine King	1 episode
2010	The Persuasionists	Susie	3 episodes
2011–2013	Coronation Street	Kirsty Soames	192 episodes
2013	Moving On	Jo	1 episode
2013	Strictly Come Dancing	Herself	Contestant
2013	Strictly Come Dancing: It Takes Two	Herself	
2014	Sally the Life Coach	Sally	Web miniseries
2014	Doctor Who	Ashley Carter	Episode: "Last Christmas"
2015	Death in Paradise	Lucy Thomson	1 episode
2015	Jekyll and Hyde	Isabella "Bella" Charming	Series regular
2017–2019	Free Rein	Maggie Steel-Phillips	Main role
2019	Vera	Megan Sibisi	1 episode
2019	Titans	Mercy Graves	6 episodes
2019	Midsomer Murders	Rachel Stevenson	1 episode
2020	Strike	Lorelei	3 episodes
2021	McDonald & Dodds	Deborah Winwick	1 episode
2022	Your Christmas or Mine?	Kaye Taylor	Film
2023	Your Christmas or Mine 2	Kaye Taylor	Film

=== Advertisements ===
Year	Title	Role
2005	National Lottery Euromillions Rollover	Woman
2006	Coke Zero	Girlfriend
2006	Admiral Car Insurance	Jane

== Awards and nominations ==
Year	Award	Category	Result	Ref.
2012	The British Soap Awards	Villain of the Year	Nominated	
2012	The British Soap Awards	Best Newcomer	Won	
2012	TV Choice Awards	Best Soap Newcomer	Shortlisted	
2012	Inside Soap Awards	Best Newcomer	Shortlisted	
2013	18th National Television Awards	Newcomer	Nominated	
2013	All About Soap Awards	Best Wedding (shared with Alan Halsall)	Won	
2013	The British Soap Awards	Villain of the Year	Won	
2013	The British Soap Awards	Best Dramatic Performance	Won	
2013	Inside Soap Awards	Best Bitch	Won	
