= 18th National Television Awards =

British awards ceremony in 2013

- Date: 23 January 2013
- Location: The O2 Arena, London
- Country: United Kingdom
- Presented by: Dermot O'Leary
- Website: http://www.nationaltvawards.com/

Television/radio coverage
- Network: ITV1 (main show); ITV2 (awards party)
- Runtime: 180 mins. (inc. adverts)

The 18th National Television Awards was held at The O2 Arena on 23 January 2013. The event was presented by Dermot O'Leary; who himself was nominated for an award.

== Awards ==
Category Presenter(s)	Winner	Nominated
Most Popular Serial Drama Performance; Presented by Nigel Havers	Alan Halsall (Coronation Street)	Michelle Keegan (Coronation Street); Emmett J. Scanlan (Hollyoaks); Adam Woodyatt (EastEnders)
Most Popular Actor; Presented by Darcey Bussell	Colin Morgan (Merlin)	Benedict Cumberbatch (Sherlock); Daniel Mays (Mrs Biggs); Matt Smith (Doctor Who)
Most Popular Actress; Presented by Julian Fellowes	Miranda Hart (Call the Midwife)	Sheridan Smith (Mrs Biggs); Suranne Jones (Scott & Bailey); Karen Gillan (Doctor Who)
Most Popular Newcomer; Presented by Ashleigh and Pudsey	David Witts (EastEnders)	Joseph Thompson (Hollyoaks); Natalie Gumede (Coronation Street); Liam Fox (Emmerdale)
Most Popular Drama; Presented by Ben Miller	Downton Abbey (ITV1)	Doctor Who (BBC One); Merlin (BBC One); Sherlock (BBC One)
Most Popular Serial Drama; Presented by Donny and Marie Osmond	Coronation Street (ITV1)	EastEnders (BBC One); Emmerdale (ITV1); Hollyoaks (Channel 4)
Most Popular Entertainment Programme; Presented by Mary Berry and Paul Hollywood	I'm a Celebrity...Get Me Out of Here! (ITV1)	Alan Carr: Chatty Man (Channel 4); The Only Way Is Essex (ITV2); The Graham Norton Show (BBC One)
Most Popular Talent Show; Presented by McFly	Strictly Come Dancing (BBC One)	Britain's Got Talent (ITV1); Dancing on Ice (ITV1); The Voice UK (BBC One); The X Factor (ITV1)
Most Popular Factual Programme; Presented by Alexander Armstrong and Richard Osman	Paul O'Grady: For the Love of Dogs (ITV1)	The Apprentice (BBC One); The Great British Bake Off (BBC One); Top Gear (BBC Two)
Most Popular Entertainment Presenter; Presented by Nicole Scherzinger	Ant & Dec	Alan Carr; Keith Lemon; Dermot O'Leary
Most Popular Comedy Programme; Presented by June Brown	Mrs. Brown's Boys (BBC One/RTÉ One)	Absolutely Fabulous (BBC One); Benidorm (ITV1); The Big Bang Theory (Channel 4/CBS)
Most Popular Quiz Programme; Presented by Jack Whitehall	QI (BBC Two)	Have I Got News for You (BBC One); Mock the Week (BBC Two); Would I Lie To You? (BBC One)
Most Popular Daytime Programme; Presented by Brendan O'Carroll	This Morning (ITV1)	Come Dine with Me (Channel 4); The Chase (ITV1); The Jeremy Kyle Show (ITV1)
Most Popular Documentary Programme Presented by Brian Cox	Frozen Planet (BBC One)	Big Fat Gypsy Weddings (Channel 4); One Born Every Minute (Channel 4); Planet Earth Live (BBC One)
Landmark Award; Presented by Clare Balding	London 2012 Olympics and Paralympics; Collected by Chris Hoy, David Weir and Sebastian Coe	
Special Recognition Award; Presented by Dermot O'Leary	Joanna Lumley	
