= Candice Stowe =

Fictional character from Coronation Street

- Coronation Street character
- Portrayed by: Nikki Sanderson
- Duration: 1999–2005
- First appearance: Episode 4711; 5 November 1999
- Last appearance: Episode 6156; 7 November 2005
- Introduced by: Jane MacNaught
- Spin-off appearances: Coronation Street: Pantomime (2005)
In-universe information
- Occupation: Hair stylist
- Father: Bill Stowe
- Mother: Marion Stowe

Candice Stowe is a fictional character from the British ITV soap opera Coronation Street, played by Nikki Sanderson. She was introduced as the best friend of established character Sarah-Louise Platt (Tina O'Brien). She made her first on-screen appearance on 5 November 1999.

== Development ==
In June 2005, it was reported that Sanderson had quit her role as Candice. "I have had the most fantastic and memorable time here at Corrie," Sanderson said. She went on to say: "I made the decision to leave as it is time for me and Candice to leave the cobbles on a high. I am really sad to be going because I will miss everybody. I am excited about what the future holds and I'd like to thank everybody for the fantastic opportunities I have been given."

Coronation Street producer Tony Wood said: "Candice is a character with a great deal of ambition and we felt it was not believable that she would stay in Weatherfield forever. At the same time Nikki has indicated that she wants to try her hand at other projects - it therefore suits Coronation Street and Nikki for the character to be written out this autumn. Nikki has been a real asset to the show and the writers have had great fun writing for Candice. We wish her all the best for the future."

Following her departure, The People claimed that Sanderson quit her role after becoming tired of being sidelined by the show's producers. She apparently felt that the soap's scriptwriters favoured her fellow cast-members Tina O'Brien (Sarah Platt) and Samia Ghadie (Maria Sutherland). The newspaper claimed that Sanderson told former boyfriend Jamie Meakin about her frustrations. "The whole thing about Nikki leaving Corrie for love and a singing career is really only half the truth and bit of a smoke screen," Meakin revealed. "She would say, 'I'm just as good as anyone else' and get all upset. To be honest, Nikki was jealous of the attention Tina and Samia got all the time." Sanderson later denied the rumours, explaining, "I've never felt sidelined by anyone. You only have to watch the show to see that I've had some fantastic storylines which I have thoroughly enjoyed. The only person who knows the real reasons why I'm leaving the show is me. I knew there would be speculation but to say things that aren't true hurts."

In May 2013, Sanderson, who has since joined Hollyoaks in the role of Maxine Minniver, revealed that she has never considered reprising her role as Candice. Speaking to the Manchester Evening News, Sanderson said: "I've never even thought about going back to Corrie – I left seven years ago. I've done so many other things in that time. That's why it doesn't even feel like a crossover going into Hollyoaks, I've had a complete career between the two soaps." She continued: "Corrie was my first main job and I loved it, I loved being challenged. When I left Corrie I went on to a job where we were filming four or five scenes a day. I couldn't believe it, I was used to filming 16 scenes a day! I'd just assumed all TV work was like that."

== Storylines ==
Candice first appeared as Sarah Platt's (Tina O'Brien) best friend from school. Candice was one of the first people Sarah told about her pregnancy. When people at their school start to tease Sarah about her weight gain, Candice tries to help by telling that them that she is pregnant, which leads to everyone finding out about it. Sarah is initially upset but later forgives her. While many of Sarah's friends turned against her, Candice sticks by her throughout the pregnancy and birth of her daughter Bethany, and becomes Bethany's godmother.

Her mother did not approve of Sarah when she became pregnant and called her a bad influence on her daughter, but it was later revealed that Candice was the bad influence on Sarah. Candice and her mother's relationship broke down when Candice's mother would not believe that she was being sexually harassed by her mother's boyfriend. Sarah's grandmother, Audrey Roberts (Sue Nicholls), soon took pity on Candice and she moved into the salon flat. Candice then went on to work as a trainee hairdresser in Audrey's salon.

Candice dated Todd Grimshaw (Bruno Langley), but he broke up with her after discovering that she had slept with his brother Jason Grimshaw (Ryan Thomas). When promising footballer Warren Baldwin (Danny Young) arrived in Weatherfield, she dreamed of fame and soon got together with him. But he later ended their relationship when he left to play for a Spanish team. Candice also dated Darren Michaels (Nicholas Zabel) and Adam Barlow (Sam Robertson), but later dumped him via a letter as she left the street when Status Quo offered her a job as a stylist.
