= List of Coronation Street characters introduced in 2004 =

The following is a list of characters that first appeared in the ITV soap opera Coronation Street in 2004, by order of first appearance.

== Eric Garside ==
Eric Garside, played by Peter Kay, appeared on 30 January 2004. Kay's casting was announced on 29 November 2003 and that he would appear in two episodes. Eric is a drayman who arrives at the Rovers Return Inn in January 2004 for a date with Shelley Unwin (Sally Lindsay). A source told Digital Spy: "It's a very, very funny storyline. The date over dinner turns into a hilarious sequence of comic errors. It will become apparent the couple have no chance of a future together." He immediately reclaims £10 that Jack Duckworth (Bill Tarmey) had borrowed four years earlier. Eric takes Shelley to a posh restaurant and the pair then go back to Eric's house for a cup of tea. Eric's overbearing mother, Dolly, greets them in her dressing gown and Shelley beats a hasty retreat, refusing Eric's offer of another date. She advises him to cut the apron strings before asking another girl out.

== Amy Barlow ==
Amy Katherine Barlow (née Patience Cropper) is a fictional character in the ITV soap opera Coronation Street, portrayed by Elle Mulvaney. She was born on screen during the episode broadcast on 9 February 2004. To date, the character has been portrayed by eight child actors; Holly Bowyer, Rebecca Pike, Louisa Morris, Rachel and Sarah Corker, Madison Hampson, Amber Chadwick and Mulvaney. Although Amy's surname has stayed Barlow, Chadwick was credited as Amy McDonald for three episodes from 2009 to 2010. Amy's storylines have included her mother Tracy (Kate Ford) selling her to Roy Cropper (David Neilson), who was presumed to be the father of Amy, and his wife, Hayley (Julie Hesmondhalgh), becoming lactose intolerant and purposefully making herself ill so her parents are nice to each other, losing her great-grandmother Blanche Hunt (Maggie Jones) and grandmother Deirdre and being stuck in Victoria Court flats when a fire was accidentally started by Tracy.

== Yvonne Casey ==
Yvonne Casey
- Coronation Street character
- Portrayed by: Yvonne O'Grady
- Duration: 2004, 2006–2007, 2010
- First appearance: 30 April 2004
- Last appearance: 18 October 2010
In-universe information
- Daughters: Claire Peacock
- Grandsons: Freddie Peacock; Joshua Peacock (adoptive)

Yvonne Casey is the mother of Claire Peacock (Julia Haworth). Little is known about her, but during Claire's battle with post-natal depression, Yvonne admitted she had not been close enough to Claire as a child. She occasionally appears to babysit Freddie (Niall and Luke Beresford) and Joshua (Benjamin Beresford) and to support Claire during marital crises with Ashley (Steven Arnold).

In September 2006, Claire begins leaving home every day, telling Ashley that Yvonne has terminal cancer and needs her care. After several weeks, Yvonne shows up at Ashley's butcher shop, telling Ashley she had been away learning yoga techniques. She is shocked to learn the lies Claire has told, and then works with Ashley to help Claire recover from post-natal depression. In 2007, Claire moves in with Yvonne following an arson attack which damages the Peacock home. She is shown to object to Claire's friendship with Casey Carswell (Zoe Henry). Claire then returns home. In summer 2008 Claire and the kids stay with her while their new home is being renovated. Yvonne made her last appearance in October 2010, when she visits Claire, telling her about her plans to move to France with her new partner.

Claire tries to contact Yvonne in late 2010 to inform her that Ashley has died from injuries sustained during an explosion on Coronation Street. Claire leaves the Street in January 2011, to join Yvonne in France.

== Dennis Stokes ==
Dennis Stokes
- Coronation Street character
- Portrayed by: Duncan Preston
- First appearance: 2 May 2004
- Last appearance: 28 May 2004
- Introduced by: Steve Frost
In-universe information
- Occupation: Con artist
- Wife: Lily Stokes

Dennis Stokes, played by Duncan Preston, plotted to con Fred Elliott with a Thai bride scheme. Dennis, met Fred at a golf club, and had a wife from the Far East, Lily. Dennis suggested to Fred the idea of finding a partner from the same region on the internet. After showing photos to Fred of various women from a dating site, Fred chooses one known as Orchid Pattaya. However, unbeknownst to Fred, Dennis and Stacy are plotting together: Orchid is a false name used by Stacy. Fred provides the money for Orchid to fly over from Thailand, where he believes she lives. He meets Orchid at Manchester Airport, where she has been secretly waiting with Dennis. Fred then takes her to Weatherfield.

Orchid speaks in a Thai accent and claims to be staying with a distant relative in East Didsbury. Shortly after their first meeting, she says that she has to return home because her father is unwell. Dennis suggests to Fred that if Fred wants Orchid to stay, he could offer money for her father's medical bills. Fred later gives Orchid a cheque, and she says she will stay.

Fred and Orchid have dinner with his son Ashley and his partner Claire. However, Ashley's questioning of Orchid makes her uncomfortable, and she leaves. Fred ponders to Dennis what he can do for Orchid, and Dennis suggests buying her some jewellery. Harry Flagg, who works at Fred's business, The Rovers Return, follows Dennis, where he sees Dennis and Orchid (aka Stacy) talking together on the market. Harry notes that Stacy has a Mancunian accent.

In the meantime, however, Ashley has apologised to Orchid, and Fred proposes to her; she accepts. Despite this, Claire has her suspicions. Harry tells Ashley about what he saw on the market. This leads Ashley to take Fred to the market, where he sees Stacy and Dennis, and confronts them both. Fred threatens to call the police, but does not do this.

Fred subsequently returns to the market with Harry, and they find Dennis, who says that Stacy has gone to Ibiza. Harry pretends to be "ex-CID", and threatens to tell his former colleagues on the force about what has happened. To avoid this, Dennis hands over several hundreds of pounds in cash, and says he will provide more. Fred also makes Dennis agree to resign from the golf club. Dennis was not seen again.

== Stacy Hilton ==
Stacy Hilton
- Coronation Street character
- Portrayed by: Casey-Lee Jolleys
- Duration: 2004, 2006
- First appearance: 10 May 2004
- Last appearance: 8 February 2006
- Introduced by: Steve Frost
In-universe information
- Occupation: Market trader

Stacy Hilton, aka Orchid Pattaya, portrayed by Casey-Lee Jolleys, was a trader on Levenshulme Market who conspired with Dennis Stokes to con Fred Elliott. Dennis, who met Fred at a golf club, and had a wife from the Far East, suggested to Fred the idea of finding a partner from the same region on the internet. After showing photos to Fred of various women from a dating site, Fred chooses one known as Orchid Pattaya. However, unbeknownst to Fred, Dennis and Stacy are plotting together: Orchid is a false name used by Stacy. Fred provides the money for Orchid to fly over from Thailand, where he believes she lives. He meets Orchid at Manchester Airport, where she has been secretly waiting with Dennis. Fred then takes her to Weatherfield.

Orchid speaks in a Thai accent and claims to be staying with a distant relative in East Didsbury. Shortly after their first meeting, she says that she has to return home because her father is unwell. Dennis suggests to Fred that if Fred wants Orchid to stay, he could offer money for her father's medical bills. Fred later gives Orchid a cheque, and she says she will stay.

Fred and Orchid have dinner with his son Ashley and his partner Claire. However, Ashley's questioning of Orchid makes her uncomfortable, and she leaves. Fred ponders to Dennis what he can do for Orchid, and Dennis suggests buying her some jewellery. Harry Flagg, who works at Fred's business, The Rovers Return, follows Dennis, where he sees Dennis and Orchid (aka Stacy) talking together on the market. Harry notes that Stacy has a Mancunian accent.

In the meantime, however, Ashley has apologised to Orchid, and Fred proposes to her; she accepts. Despite this, Claire has her suspicions. Harry reveals the truth to Ashley, who takes Fred to the market. Upon seeing Dennis and Stacy together, Fred realises the truth, and is aghast. He confronts both of them, and threatens to call the police, but does not. Stacy admits that she has never been to Thailand. When Fred subsequently returns to the market with Harry, Dennis says that Stacy has gone to Ibiza. Stacy is not seen again until February 2006.

== Danny Baldwin ==
Danny moves to Weatherfield to help his father Mike (Johnny Briggs) with his business. Not long after his wife Frankie (Debra Stephenson), who had previously cheated on him, arrives as she wants to give their marriage another chance. They are soon joined by Danny's sons, Warren (Danny Young) and Jamie (Rupert Hill). Unaware of Frankie's intentions, Danny has a brief fling with Sunita Parekh (Shobna Gulati) shortly after his arrival but Sunita does not know he is married and is very hurt when Frankie arrives. The Baldwins then rent Number 7 from Blanche Hunt (Maggie Jones).

== Billy Platt ==
Billy Platt
- Coronation Street character
- Portrayed by: Unknown
- First appearance: 1 June 2004
- Last appearance: 7 June 2004
In-universe information
- Father: Todd Grimshaw
- Mother: Sarah Platt
- Half-brothers: Harry Platt
- Half-sisters: Bethany Platt
- Grandfathers: Brian Tilsley; Martin Platt (adoptive)
- Grandmothers: Gail Platt; Eileen Grimshaw
- Uncles: Jason Grimshaw; Nick Tilsley; David Platt
- First cousins: Lily Platt; Harper Platt; Sam Blakeman; Max Turner (adoptive)
- Other relatives: Bert Tilsley; Ivy Tilsley; Colin Grimshaw; Ted Page; Audrey Roberts; Stephen Reid; Julie Carp; Elsie Tanner; Dennis Tanner; George Shuttleworth

Billy Platt is the son of Sarah Platt (Tina O'Brien) and Todd Grimshaw (Bruno Langley/Gareth Pierce). Sarah, already a teenage mother, was 16 at the time she conceived Billy, after Todd had suggested the two try for a baby of their own. Sarah was reluctant, and when she discovered her pregnancy, she was considering getting an abortion, since her mother Gail Platt (Helen Worth) had recently had to deal with Sarah's stepfather Richard Hillman (Brian Capron) attempting to murder their family. However, Todd brought Sarah round to the idea of having the baby.

Just before Christmas 2003, Sarah's brother Nick Tilsley (Adam Rickitt), revealed to their mother that his sister was pregnant. By this time, Sarah had made a firm decision to keep the baby. Gail wanted Sarah to have an abortion, so she would not be 16 years old with two children; this caused friction with Gail. In April 2004, Sarah suffered her first placental abruption, and felt Billy was dead. Once at the hospital, it was discovered that Billy was fine, but his heartbeat was slow. This was caused by some uncertainty within Sarah and Todd's relationship.

However, when Todd reveals to Sarah that he is gay, she suffers a second placental abruption on 1 June 2004, three months away from her due date. The abruption was so serious that Billy had to be born by caesarean section. His first 24 hours alive were critical, and Todd was not allowed to see him, as Sarah did not want Todd to see Billy. In addition, Sarah did not want her son. On 2 June, Sarah finally agreed to see her son, who was in an incubator. However, Billy's health deteriorated, and whilst Sarah was bonding with Billy for the first time, he died.

Todd never saw his son alive, apart from a photograph that Gail gave him after his death. Although he was allowed to be named as the father, Gail and Sarah agreed that Billy should have Platt as a surname instead of Grimshaw. Sarah then continuously blamed herself for his death until his funeral on 7 June 2004.

Despite doubts from the rest of the street's residents, Todd finally showed up with his family to say goodbye to his son. Sarah and Todd regularly visited his grave until they left Weatherfield.

In December 2015, when Sarah discovered she was pregnant with her deceased ex-boyfriend Callum Logan's (Sean Ward) baby, she tells Todd, whom she had reconciled with after her return in March that year, that she wants an abortion. However, Todd reminds Sarah of how she felt after Billy died, and suggests that this baby could possibly replace him.

Sarah later changes her mind after Kylie Platt (Paula Lane) stops her from making the decision, as she also reminds Sarah that her own son with Callum, Max Turner (Harry McDermott), does not remind her of him, and she loves him regardless. Sarah later gave birth to Harry in March via caesarean section, like Billy.

== Frankie Baldwin ==
Francesca "Frankie" Fraser (previously Baldwin) was played by Debra Stephenson. Glamorous Frankie met her husband Danny (Bradley Walsh) when she worked as a babysitter for his son Jamie (Rupert Hill). Even though he was still married to his first wife Carol, Frankie could not resist sleeping with Danny, as she had fallen in love with him. They had a son of their own, Warren (Danny Young), and she also became close to her stepson Jamie after she married Danny. He cheated on her numerous times, but she continued to forgive him until he cheated on her with Jamie's girlfriend Leanne Battersby (Jane Danson).

== Dr. Patel ==
Dr. Patel
- Coronation Street character
- Portrayed by: Josephine Lloyd-Welcome
- Duration: 2004, 2008–2010
- First appearance: 12 July 2004
- Last appearance: 15 January 2010
In-universe information
- Occupation: Doctor

Dr. Patel, played by Josephine Lloyd-Welcome, was first seen as Sunita Alahan's (Shobna Gulati) doctor in 2004, but was not credited as Dr. Patel. She worked at Rosamund Street Medical Centre. In 2008, she re-appeared when her receptionist, Gail Platt (Helen Worth) asked her to visit neighbour, Jerry Morton (Michael Starke), who had recently suffered a heart attack. She appeared again the following spring, when Gail's boyfriend Joe McIntyre (Reece Dinsdale) suffered a back injury. He visited her several times over the next few months, as he had become addicted to the painkillers she had prescribed to him.

Dr. Patel was last seen tending to Sunita's daughter Asha Alahan (Tanisha Gorey) in January 2010. This was LLoyd-Weclome's first of three roles as she returned in 2012 to play Raveena Bhatia, the superior of Marcus Dent (Charlie Condou) at Weatherfield General and then again in 2025 as Dev Alahan's (Jimmi Harkishin) Aunty Rani.

== Jamie Baldwin ==
James Andrew "Jamie" Baldwin, played by Rupert Hill. He first appeared in 2004 and left in 2008. In March 2011 it was announced that Jamie would return for one episode on 24 April 2011. Shortly after his arrival in Weatherfield, Jamie began dating Leanne Battersby (Jane Danson). He left her briefly for her enemy Maria Sutherland (Samia Ghadie), but eventually reconciled with Leanne again. She then embarked on an affair with his father, Danny (Bradley Walsh). When this was revealed, Jamie broke up with Leanne and disowned Danny. Jamie's mother, Carol, came to Weatherfield and stayed with Jamie and Frankie (Debra Stephenson), who had thrown Danny out because of his affair with Leanne. He supported her during her attempts to give up drinking, but she tried to destroy his relationship with Frankie, unsuccessfully. He later failed in a rebound romance with Joanne Jackson (Zaraah Abrahams), as his mother's continuing problems, which dominated his life. After Carol schemed to break the bond between Jamie and Frankie by insinuating that they fancied each other, they decided to kick her out and Jamie disowned her.

== Warren Baldwin ==
Warren Baldwin
- Coronation Street character
- Portrayed by: Danny Young
- Duration: 2004–2006
- First appearance: 13 August 2004
- Last appearance: 22 November 2006
In-universe information
- Occupation: Footballer
- Father: Danny Baldwin
- Mother: Frankie Baldwin
- Half-brothers: Jamie Baldwin
- Grandfathers: Mike Baldwin
- Grandmothers: Viv Baldwin
- Uncles: Mark Redman; Adam Barlow

Warren Baldwin, played by Danny Young. Warren is the youngest member of the Baldwin family. He is the half-brother of Jamie Baldwin (Rupert Hill) and son of Danny (Bradley Walsh) and Frankie Baldwin (Debra Stephenson). He arrives on the Street to live with his parents after being kicked out of his football club. His mother was disappointed when she found out about this as she had hopes of his fame and fortune. Candice Stowe (Nikki Sanderson) later wrongfully finds out that he is no longer a footballer and that Warren had been telling lies to impress her, resulting in Candice dumping him. Later Warren joins Weatherfield County FC, and Candice decides that she wants to give him another chance. In July 2005, Warren leaves the Street to launch his football career and start a new life in Spain.

He makes a surprise return to Weatherfield on 20 November 2006 when he is back in England for trials with Port Vale, which he fails. Warren moves to Spain again, and in early December 2006 his mother goes to visit him to see if he has heard from father Danny who had left Weatherfield and disappeared. She also reveals her affair with Jamie to him, a revelation which results in Warren falling out with his mother.

== Kelly Crabtree ==
Kelly Louise Crabtree, played by Tupele Dorgu, the character first appeared onscreen during the episode airing on 6 September 2004. On 6 November 2009 it was announced that Tupele Dorgu had decided not to renew her contract which meant that her character would depart the show in March 2010. She made her last appearance on 19 March 2010. Karen heads to work and is waiting outside the factory and starts talking to Kelly Crabtree, a machinist at Underworld who is leaving as she is getting married. Karen tells Kelly that she will buy her a drink at lunchtime in the Rovers. Kelly comments about there being a clique and Karen says that Underworld is too small for that. Karen leaves her partner Steve and lets Sonia, Janice, Kelly and Hayley have a look through her stuff and pick what they want. Kelly is back after not getting married. Her husband-to-be slept with her chief bridesmaid after catching her with a cocktail waiter. Kelly asks Danny for her job back but is told she has been replaced by Sean. Danny winds Kelly and Sean up about who can have the job then tells them that they can both work at Underworld. In 2005, Kelly starts seeing Lloyd Mullaney (Craig Charles) but after she finds out he is cheating on her, she puts laxatives in his drink. Lloyd is rushed to hospital but recovers. Kelly later admits that she put the laxatives in his drink and they break up. Later, Lloyd wants to reconcile but she is not prepared to forgive his cheating.

== Yana Lumb ==
Yana Lumb
- Coronation Street character
- Portrayed by: Jayne Bickerton
- Duration: 2004–2007
- First appearance: 4 October 2004
- Last appearance: 16 July 2007
In-universe information
- Occupation: Chip shop worker
- Siblings: Mr. Lumb

Yana Lumb, played by Jayne Bickerton, is Cilla Battersby-Brown's (Wendi Peters) best friend and in a way is usually involved in Cilla's scams and plots. Yana works with Cilla in Wong's chip shop on Rosamund Street until its closure in 2007.

Yana ends up going on Cilla's honeymoon with her instead of Cilla's husband Les Battersby (Bruce Jones), who is in trouble with Cilla for trashing all the wedding presents at the reception.

Yana takes pity on Les in late November 2006, when he reveals his suspicions of Cilla having an affair. Yana is shocked that Cilla would not confide in her and feels sorry for a miserable Les, they become more and more attracted to each other and eventually cannot resist each other. Yana engages in an affair with Les and sleeps with him in the living room, only to be seen by Cilla's son, Chesney Brown (Sam Aston). Cilla soon finds out about the affair, and pretends she has skin cancer. She forces Yana and Les to sit in a bathtub of mushy peas on Christmas Eve to raise money for Cilla's holiday fund to Florida. Before she leaves, she revealed the truth.

Returning in December, Cilla slaps Yana but forgives her. Her last appearance is in July 2007 when she and Cilla are both fired from the takeaway.

== Violet Wilson ==
Violet Wilson, played by Jenny Platt, made her first onscreen appearance on 8 October 2004 and remained until 29 February 2008. Platt returned for one episode on 24 April 2011. Violet arrives on the Street on in October 2004, as a barmaid in the Rovers Return Inn. A former pupil of Ken Barlow (William Roache) when he was a teacher at Weatherfield Comprehensive, she addresses him as "Sir" during her time on the Street. Violet befriends neighbour Katy Harris (Lucy-Jo Hudson) and is good friends with Sean Tully (Antony Cotton), whom she knew before moving to Coronation Street. Violet begins a relationship with Jason Grimshaw (Ryan Thomas), whose mother Eileen (Sue Cleaver) finds Violet a pleasant young woman. After some unease by Violet, who states that she had left home at a young age to live with an older, dominant man, she moves into 11 Coronation Street with Jason. They break up after Violet is seduced by Charlie Stubbs, but reunite. The relationship breaks up when Jason has an affair with Sarah Platt (Tina O'Brien). Jason proposes to Violet but she turns him down.

== Ian Davenport ==
Ian Davenport
- Coronation Street character
- Portrayed by: Philip Bretherton
- Duration: 2004–2005
- First appearance: 8 November 2004
- Last appearance: 11 May 2005
In-universe information
- Occupation: Car Salesman
- Wife: Justine Davenport
- Children: Gemma Davenport

Ian Davenport, played by Philip Bretherton, is the father of Gemma, Rosie Webster's (Helen Flanagan) classmate at Oakhill. He first appears on 8 November when Rosie and her family are invited over. The Davenports and the Websters get along very well and Ian soon takes a shine to Rosie's mother, Sally (Sally Dynevor). Sally later takes a job working for Ian at his dealership and they soon begin an affair. When Ian's wife, Justine suspects he is having an affair, Sally gets nervous and tries to end things with Ian. Ian then threatens to make her life miserable at work if she does end the affair. When Sally tells her husband Kevin Webster (Michael Le Vell) that Ian tried to fire her for refusing to sleep with him, Kevin punches Ian in the mouth and he is not seen again.

== Other characters ==
Character	Episode date(s)	Actor	Circumstances
Mrs Fanshaw	22 March	Alison King	A customer of builders Charlie Stubbs (Bill Ward) and Jason Grimshaw (Ryan Thomas) who had an appointment to fit a radiator in her bathroom. Mrs. Fanshaw lusted after Jason. Charlie took his cue shortly after and left Jason to "finish the job". On the pretext of a faulty thermostat in her bedroom, she led Jason in there and soon made her intentions crystal clear. He succumbed and Jason and Mrs. Fanshaw had sex, despite Jason being the supposedly faithful boyfriend of Candice Stowe (Nikki Sanderson). King would later return to Coronation Street in 2006 playing the role of Carla Connor.
Lily Stokes	2–5 May	Wendy Kweh	The wife of Dennis Stokes, who plotted to con Fred Elliott with a Thai bride scheme. Dennis and Lily met Fred at a golf club. Dennis suggested to Fred the idea of finding a partner from the Far East on the internet, as Dennis claimed he had done with Lily.
The Reverend Colin Green	23 May – 7 June	Patrick Bridgeman	A Catholic pastor, who was supposed to wed Sarah Platt (Tina O'Brien) and Todd Grimshaw (Bruno Langley), but the wedding was soon called off when Todd admitted to Sarah that he is gay and had an affair with Weatherfield General nurse Karl Foster (Chris Finch). When Sarah confided in Colin for comfort, he told her to forgive him, but the only thing Sarah wanted was for Todd to go to hell. Colin then conducted the funeral of Billy Platt, Todd and Sarah's baby son who died after being born three months prematurely. Sarah banned Todd from the funeral, but grief-stricken he showed up anyway and told Sarah he did not get to see Billy when he was alive and needed to be there now. Sarah agreed and let Todd say a few words and scatter some earth over the casket, but she broke down watching him.
