= Bethany Platt =

Fictional character from Coronation Street

- Coronation Street character
- Lucy Fallon as Bethany Platt (2015)
- Portrayed by: Mia Cookson (2000); Amy and Emily Walton (2000–2007); Lucy Fallon (2015–present)
- Duration: 2000–2007, 2015–2020, 2023–present
- First appearance: 4 June 2000
- Introduced by: Jane MacNaught (2000); Stuart Blackburn (2015); Iain MacLeod (2023)
- One of the Walton twins as Bethany Platt (2007)
In-universe information
- Other names: Bethany Britney Platt
- Occupation: Student; Apprentice Stylist; Lap dancer; Waitress; Journalist
- Father: Neil Fearns
- Mother: Sarah Platt
- Stepfather: Jason Grimshaw; Adam Barlow
- Half-brothers: Billy Platt; Harry Platt
- Grandfathers: Brian Tilsley; Mr. Fearns; Martin Platt (adoptive)
- Grandmothers: Gail Platt; Brenda Fearns
- Uncles: Nick Tilsley; David Platt
- First cousins: Lily Platt; Harper Platt; Sam Blakeman; Max Turner (adoptive)
- Other relatives: Audrey Roberts; Stephen Reid; George Shuttleworth; Ivy Tilsley

Bethany Platt is a fictional character from the British ITV soap opera Coronation Street. She was born on-screen during the episode broadcast on 4 June 2000. She was played by Mia Cookson in 2000 and by twins Amy and Emily Walton from 2000 until 30 December 2007, when the character departed. The character was reintroduced with Lucy Fallon taking over the role, and Bethany made her return on 20 March 2015. On 2 May 2019, Fallon announced that she had quit the show. She filmed her last scene on 16 January 2020 and Bethany departed on 4 March 2020. In August 2023, it was announced that Fallon would be reprising the role after three years away. Bethany returned on 31 December 2023. In February 2025, Fallon went on maternity leave after the birth of her second child. She departed on 10 February and returned on 3 October.

Bethany is the daughter of established character Sarah Platt (Tina O'Brien) and her classmate Neil Fearns (Paul Holowaty), half-sister of Billy and Harry Platt, granddaughter of Gail Platt (Helen Worth) and Brian Tilsley (Christopher Quinten), and great-granddaughter of Audrey Roberts (Sue Nicholls). Bethany's storylines have included her taking ecstasy tablets when her uncle, David Platt (Jack P. Shepherd), hid them in her doll. Bethany departed Weatherfield with her mother Sarah for a new life in Milan. Her return storyline saw her running away from home in Milan back to Weatherfield, and since then, her storylines have included the character's infatuation with David's enemy Callum Logan (Sean Ward) in the midst of his conflict against her family; being a victim of school bullying; developing a crush on her mother's boyfriend Gary Windass (Mikey North); her dangerous relationship with local pimp boss Nathan Curtis (Christopher Harper), who subjugates Bethany in child grooming and sexual exploitation; becoming a lapdancer in the follow-up of her grooming ordeal, which involves building a friendship with Craig Tinker (Colson Smith); being stalked and kidnapped by the daughter, Kayla Clifton (Mollie Winnard), of one of the men who abused her; dating Ryan Connor (Ryan Prescott); and helping her colleague Daniel Osbourne (Rob Mallard) with the death of his wife Sinead (Katie McGlynn) and falling in love with him. She left Weatherfield to start a new life in London, before returning three years later. Since her return her storylines have focused on reconciling her relationship with Daniel, a short feud with Daniel’s love interest Daisy Midgeley (Charlotte Jordan), involvement in the disappearance of Lauren Bolton (Cait Fitton), being diagnosed with sepsis after flying to Turkey to have cosmetic surgery done, resulting in Bethany being left with a lifelong colostomy bag.

== Casting ==
Amy and Emily Walton shared the role of Bethany from the character's birth in 2000 until 2007 when Tina O'Brien chose to quit. Mia Cookson also played the role of Bethany alongside the Walton twins in 2000. On 23 October 2014, it was announced that Bethany, now 14 years old, would return to the show. Katie Redford was initially cast in the role, but was sacked just days later before filming began after it was revealed that she was 25 years old, not 19 as she and her management had claimed. On 29 January 2015, Blackpool-born Lucy Fallon was confirmed as her replacement. She returned on 20 March 2015.

== Development ==
=== Early development ===
Bethany is introduced in 2000 when the show tackled the controversial subject of teenage pregnancy, using the character of 13-year-old Sarah Platt, recently recast to 16-year-old Tina O'Brien. The storyline was praised by health minister Yvette Cooper, saying "we need to make sure that young people themselves are aware of just how easy it is to get pregnant and just how hard it is to be a parent, if we are to get teenage pregnancy rates down" and praised Granada TV "on having the courage to include a storyline in Coronation Street about teenage pregnancy."

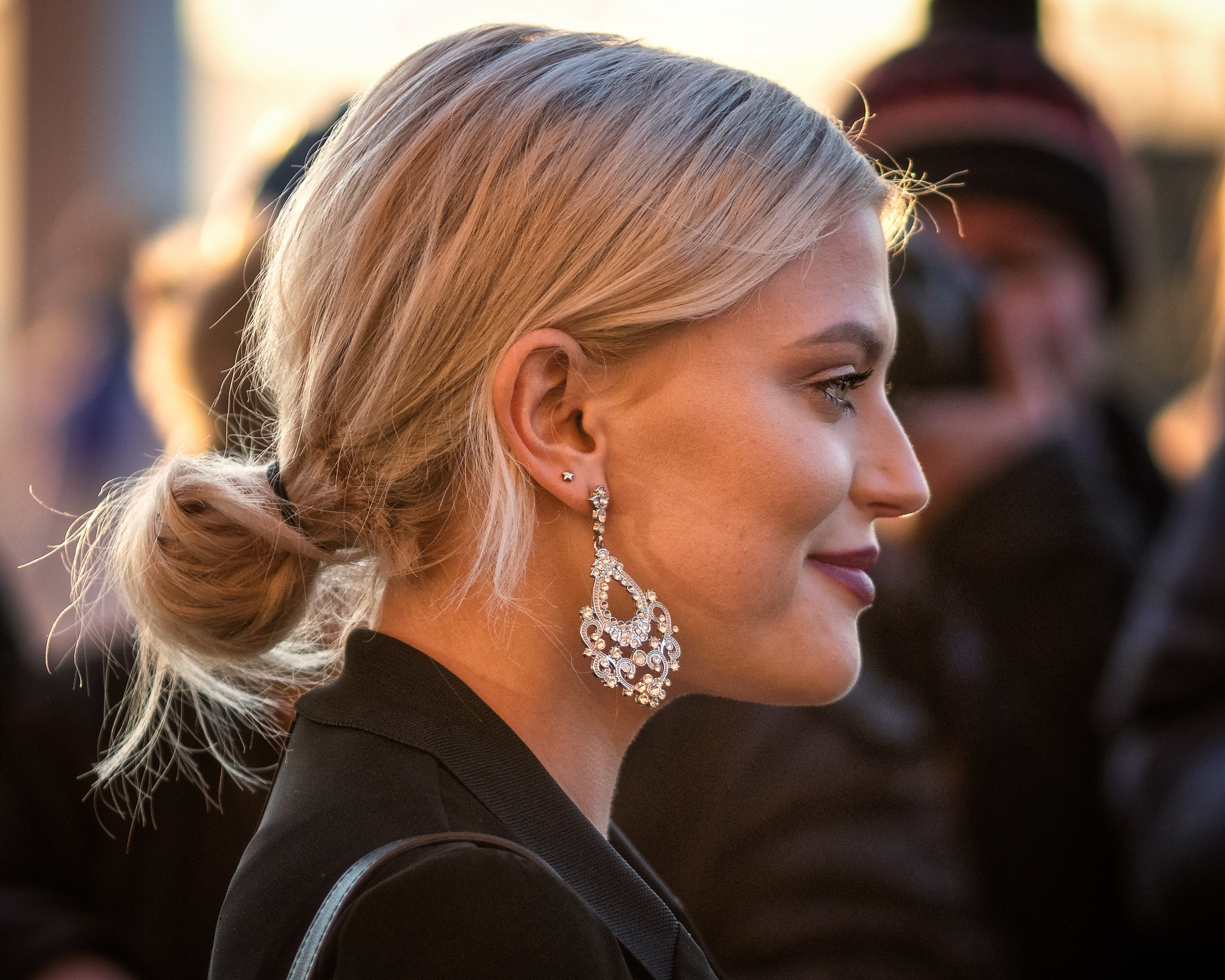
Lucy Fallon (pictured) was cast as Bethany as a last-minute replacement for Katie Redford, after it was revealed that Redford lied about her age when being considered for the role.

In 2007, a storyline involving Bethany's uncle, David Platt, planting ecstasy tablets in one of her toys and Bethany accidentally taking drugs was revealed. Of the storyline, Jack P. Shepherd commented "I was quite excited because I've not really done emotional stuff before. I've done little bits but this is a huge storyline. It's a character change for David. The only way David knows how to get attention is by doing bad things. It's the only time when people sit up and listen." Executive producer Kieran Roberts said "We didn't set out to do a story about the danger of drugs, but we have got responsibilities and if we can send out a useful message, in this case that drugs can be very dangerous, then that is all well and good."

=== Reintroduction (2015) ===
With the announcement of Sarah's return soon came the announcement of her daughter Bethany's return with actress Katie Redford being cast in the role. Speaking of the announcement, Redford said: "Until I'm actually on set, I genuinely don't think it will sink in that I'm joining the cast of Coronation Street. I know it sounds clichéd but it really feels like a dream come true. Bethany Platt is going to be such a fun and witty character to play and I hope everyone enjoys her return as much as I'm going to!" It was later revealed that Redford would be replaced in the role of Bethany with Lucy Fallon taking over the role. Speaking of her casting, Fallon commented: "Walking onto the set was surreal and nerve-wracking, but everyone has been really welcoming and I am thrilled to have been given this great opportunity." Bethany made her return on-screen on 20 March 2015, and Sarah made her return on 30 March 2015.

=== Feud with Callum Logan ===
In February 2015, producer Stuart Blackburn revealed that Sarah would embark on a relationship with Callum Logan, portrayed by Sean Ward, who is the ex-boyfriend of David's wife, Kylie Platt, portrayed by Paula Lane, and the arch-enemy of David. "David's got massive problems, because over the weeks Callum's taken a real liking to Max and Max is actually his biological son," Blackburn told ITV. "And he's got almost as many rights to Max as David does. On the seemingly good news front is the return of Bethany and Sarah, but very quickly Callum takes a real liking to Sarah. It's a liking that is returned, so huge problems for David!" Bethany also has a crush on Callum and Callum uses this to his advantage. Blackburn said "Sarah Lou is involved with Callum and her daughter Bethany also has a crush on him. Callum will use this crush and Bethany will become his insurance policy if things go wrong. Bethany thinks she is grown up, but she is just a 15-year-old kid. She is naive and she is going to get in a world of trouble because of her involvement with Callum."

=== Grooming and sexual exploitation ===
In December 2016, it was announced that Bethany would be "gradually groomed into a world of sexual exploitation" after "falling for charming" Nathan Curtis (Christopher Harper) in a storyline starting in early 2017. The storyline intends "to raise awareness of the dangers out there as well as breaking the stereotypes of the perpetrators and victims that exist." Harper said that "it's very interesting to have someone as bright and cynical as Bethany be duped by this adult who is manipulating her" and "child exploitation isn't just about what is happening to young children – that emotional hotpot we all remember of being 16, 17, 18 years of age, being clever, being open but also still vulnerable. And that’s where Bethany is."

Tina O'Brien discussed scenes when Sarah finds Bethany "clearly drunk and dressed provocatively" at Nathan's flat". She added that Sarah "has no idea about the extent" of Bethany's situation {...] she would be horrified and devastated if she knew what was going on." O'Brien said Bethany "reacts violently" when Sarah and Sarah's partner, Gary Windass (Mikey North), manage to get her home and Bethany's reaction "is terrifying and upsetting {...} Sarah does start to wonder if Bethany is in fact scared of Nathan."

Fallon said that the storyline is "so important that we do it, especially at this time, because we are targeting the people watching Coronation Street who are quite young. All the fans are quite young and they are the people we want to target." Fallon filmed a scene "where Nathan takes Bethany to his flat where there are a lot of men" and added it "was so uncomfortable, it was horrible." Fallon discussed the situation where Bethany would be passed on to another man by Nathan for sex, saying although her character isn't raped, "she agrees to have sex with the guy, but only because Nathan tells her it is normal and that this is what adult relationships are really like" and that reading it "made my [Fallon's] skin crawl. It was horrible." Fallon maintains the storyline is "really important" and hopes girls in a similar situation might think "what's happening to me isn't normal" or that "parents might start talking to their daughters about a relationship." Fallon added "the fact it's such an important storyline makes it easier to do."

Charities praised the storyline, with Barnardo's saying they are "shining a light on this serious but little discussed issue" whilst a spokesperson for the National Society for the Prevention of Cruelty to Children added "Soaps play an important part in highlighting abuse and in giving victims the courage to speak out" and they "hope it will raise awareness of the signs of grooming and encourage more victims to come forward and seek help."

=== Departure (2020) ===
On 2 May 2019, it was announced that Fallon had quit the soap after four years. Speaking of her departure, Fallon commented "It's hard to put into words how much this show means to me. I've made lifelong friends with some of the most talented and hardworking people in the industry, I've had some terrific and immensely important storylines and I've laughed with the best people everyday. I’m so thankful to Iain [MacLeod, producer] and everyone at Coronation Street, I owe everything to them and I will miss them greatly." On 16 January 2020, Fallon announced that she filmed her last on-screen appearance via Twitter. Fallon made her on-screen departure on 4 March 2020.

=== Return (2023) ===
In August 2023, it was announced that Fallon would return to the role of Bethany after Christmas and would film her first scene in the coming weeks. She returned on 31 December 2023.

== Storylines ==
=== 2000–2007 ===
When Sarah Platt (Tina O'Brien) begins to worry about gaining weight and starts being sick, she is horrified to discover she is five months pregnant just after her 13th birthday in February 2000. It is too late for an abortion, so after first considering giving her baby up for adoption and a plan for her mother Gail (Helen Worth) to pretend the baby is hers, Sarah decides to raise the baby herself and gives birth, on 4 June 2000. Just hours after her birth, Bethany is kidnapped by Alison Webster (Naomi Radcliffe), whose baby son Jake has just died. Alison and Bethany are found but Alison commits suicide by running in front of a lorry after handing Bethany over. Sarah originally plans to call her daughter Britney after her favourite pop star Britney Spears but is persuaded not to by her grandmother, Audrey Roberts (Sue Nicholls). Sarah tries to cope but, being little more than a child herself, relies heavily on her mother and once even leaves Bethany at home alone. Sarah struggles to find boyfriends who will accept that she is a teenage mother but things come to a head when she begins dating Aidan Critchley (Dean Ashton) in 2002. When Aidan crashes the stolen car he is driving and Sarah is badly injured, she realises Bethany was nearly left motherless and resolves to put her first. However, more trauma is in store for the family. In March 2003, Gail's husband Richard Hillman (Brian Capron), having been revealed as the killer of Maxine Peacock (Tracy Shaw), tries to kill Bethany, Sarah, Gail, David Platt (Jack P. Shepherd) and himself by driving the family car into the canal. Thanks to Gail handing Sarah a pair of nail scissors as she kissed her goodbye, Sarah is able to cut herself free, undo Bethany's seat belt and swim to safety with her. The family escape, while Richard dies.

When Sarah begins dating Todd Grimshaw (Bruno Langley), he accepts Bethany as his own. Much to Gail's disgust, Sarah and Bethany move in with Todd and his family, leading Gail to involving Social Services and causing a rift in the family. When Bethany's father, Neil Fearns (Paul Holowaty), is killed in a car accident in late 2003, Sarah decides to take Bethany to the funeral. Neil's mother, Brenda (Julia Deakin), is pleased to meet Bethany and asks to be part of her life. Neil had decided when Bethany was born that he wanted nothing to do with his daughter.

After Sarah and Gail fall out, Brenda invites Sarah and Bethany to live with her, even agreeing that Todd can move in too after some misgivings. However, when Brenda insists they sleep in separate rooms, Sarah worries Brenda is taking over and they leave. However, Brenda has become mentally unbalanced by her grief and kidnaps Bethany, planning to kill herself and Bethany so they can be with Neil. However, Emily Bishop (Eileen Derbyshire) finds them and manages to talk Brenda down. Despite the difficulty of looking after Bethany at such a young age, Sarah is persuaded by Todd into having another baby. However, Todd is secretly struggling with his sexuality and the shock of discovering his affair with Karl Foster (Chris Finch), sends Sarah into premature labour. Bethany's half-brother, Billy Platt, dies shortly after birth in June 2004. Bethany gets a new father figure when Sarah begins dating Todd's brother, Jason Grimshaw (Ryan Thomas), soon after their split. Jason becomes very fond of Bethany but she is almost left fatherless once again when Jason panics about the responsibilities of marriage and parenthood and jilts Sarah at the altar.

In September 2007, an increasingly unstable and off-the-rails David hides ecstasy tablets in one of Bethany's dolls, Bethany finds them and swallows one, making David panic. He makes Bethany drink salt water to make her be sick but is later forced to admit the truth. Bethany makes a full recovery but Social Services become involved and the possibility of Bethany going into care is raised. As a result, Sarah tells Gail that either David moves out or she and Bethany will. Concerned about their safety, Gail tells David to leave. However, on the day of Sarah and Jason’s wedding, David ruins it in an attempt to kill himself by driving his car into the same canal that his stepfather Richard Hillman did in attempt to drown himself, Gail, Sarah and David back in 2003. David ultimately survives. When Sarah's uncle, Stephen Reid (Todd Boyce) offers David a job in Milan, Sarah gets revenge for her ruined wedding and Bethany's trauma by planting ecstasy in his drawer at Audrey's Salon. When Audrey finds the drugs, Stephen withdraws the job offer and Sarah persuades him to give it to her instead. Sarah plans to move to Italy with Jason and Bethany. However, at the train station, Sarah admits to a horrified Jason that she planted the drugs and he refuses to go with her. Sarah and Bethany then leave for Italy without him.

=== 2015–present ===
A 14-year-old Bethany returns to Weatherfield in March 2015 and persuades Andy Carver (Oliver Farnworth) to buy her drinks in The Rovers, annoying Andy's girlfriend, Steph Britton (Tisha Merry). When Gail comes in, she reveals Bethany's identity and age, horrifying landlady Michelle Connor (Kym Marsh). Gail later phones Sarah and discovers Bethany has run away and stolen Sarah's money to pay for the flight. Bethany pleads to stay, claiming she hates Milan and Sarah virtually ignores her in favour of work and her new boyfriend, but Gail still books a return flight for her. However, Bethany hides her uncle Nick Tilsley's (Ben Price) car keys and runs away to ensure she misses her flight. Sarah returns to Weatherfield to take Bethany back to Milan but this ends in a heated argument and Bethany throwing an ornament at Sarah. The pair later reconcile and recall fond memories of their time in Milan, with Sarah agreeing they can stay a few days and that she will find her a new school when they return. However, Bethany is determined not to go back and manages to get Audrey on her side. Bethany causes further trouble when she shoplifts from a boutique, forcing Sarah to get help from David's arch-enemy Callum Logan (Sean Ward). Bethany then winds her mother up by regularly pointing out Sarah's obvious attraction to Callum, while trying to convince Jason that Sarah wants him back. When Jason tells Sarah he isn't interested in her, the two play Bethany at her own game by pretending to reunite. Bethany eventually seems to be resigned to returning to Milan. However, when Stephen repeatedly chases Sarah to send him a report and she lies that her internet is down, Bethany spots her chance and sends him a casual email, proving there is nothing wrong with their internet access. A furious Sarah tells Bethany that she has finally got her way as Stephen has fired her.

At Gail and Michael Rodwell's (Les Dennis) wedding reception, Bethany gets tipsy so Nick sends her home. Bethany later develops feelings for Callum, despite him dating her mother, and begins spending more and more time at his flat. Callum convinces Bethany to deliver some drugs to a heavily tattooed man, who intimidates Bethany. She spends the next day with Callum and his friend, Gemma Winter (Dolly-Rose Campbell), and offers to do another delivery for him. However, the police raid The Dog & Gun, Callum and Gemma's local pub, which panics Bethany. She gives the drugs to Callum who gives them to Gemma and Callum is furious when Gemma is arrested. Bethany spitefully tells Sarah that Callum has been looking at other women inappropriately, upsetting Sarah and nearly results in the couple breaking up, but Callum talks his way out of the situation.

Callum takes photos and videos of Bethany delivering his drugs and pretending to smoke cannabis which he uses to blackmail Sarah when she splits with him over his dangerous lifestyle. After learning that Callum and David's wife Kylie Platt's (Paula Lane) son, Max Turner (Harry McDermott) witnessed Callum beating up Jason in the ginnel, he drugs Sarah and forces Bethany to give him an alibi. Bethany tells the police that she was with Callum in his flat when Jason was attacked. She later retracts her statement when Callum orders his thugs to threaten Audrey and wreck No.8 and the salon. Later, unknown to Bethany, Kylie murders Callum while he is attacking Sarah, with David and Sarah helping cover up the crime. Bethany and the rest of the family are told that he is on the run from a gangster but Sarah, wrecked with guilt, takes Bethany back to Milan for a few weeks. Bethany learns Sarah is pregnant by Callum after overhearing Todd, David and Kylie discuss it. She confronts Sarah in the Bistro and reveals to Gail and Audrey about Sarah's pregnancy, who argue with Sarah.

Months later, Sarah attends Bethany's parents evening with David, but Bethany does not turn up. Sarah and David learn from one of Bethany's teachers that she has been skipping school by saying she is attending grief counselling. Sarah and David realise Bethany has intercepted letters and emails from the school about her absence to prevent her family from knowing about it. Sarah tries to contact Bethany with no response. When Bethany arrives at the pub, Sarah and Gail try to find out why she is playing truant. At school, Bethany is ganged up on by a group of girls, who make cruel remarks about her and Sarah and threaten her, pulling her hair. Bethany arrives at Sarah's baby shower and throws the cake at the wall, snapping at Sarah and telling her to put the baby up for adoption as she is a terrible mother. Todd finds Bethany on the street and he encourages her to open up and later, Bethany apologises to Sarah. Bethany later receives cruel messages from Lauren (Shannon Flynn) and Shelley (Natalie Davies), so Bethany breaks down in the alley. Bethany tries to skip school by telling Sarah she has a stomachache, but she is forced to go to school. Bethany later receives another message from Lauren and Kylie notices her upset. Bethany confides in Kylie about the bullying and Kylie gives her advice on standing up for herself. Bethany is followed home by Lauren and her gang and they threaten her again. Luke Britton (Dean Fagan) intervenes and tells them to leave. Luke takes Bethany to Sarah, where she reveals all about the bullying. Sarah then visits Lauren at home, where she shouts at her and tells her mother what she's been doing to Bethany. Bethany is followed home again by Lauren and her gang, but are chased off by Gemma, however, they steal her mobile phone. After Sarah gives birth, Bethany meets her half-brother and Sarah chooses Harry for a name from Bethany's suggestions. David and Gail learn that Bethany is still being bullied when Gemma tells David she chased the bullies off, but Bethany pleads with them not to tell Sarah. After taking Harry for a walk, Bethany is stopped by Lauren and her gang, who insult Harry. Nick defends Bethany, but he loses his temper with Lauren and throws her schoolbag into the road. Lauren and her mother later visit the Platt household, but are eventually thrown out by David. When Lauren and her gang hassle Bethany outside school, Luke collects Bethany in a flash car.

After Callum's corpse is found underneath Gail's annexe, Gail believes that Sarah is mentally ill, but Bethany refuses to believe this. When Sarah changes the locks and barricades herself in the house with Harry, Bethany persuades Sarah to open the door. Sarah is then taken to hospital when David phones for an ambulance. Bethany visits Sarah and Harry with Gail in a mother and baby unit. Bethany later intercepts a letter from her school and she confides in Gail that she has messed up her GCSEs and convinces Gail not to tell Sarah. When Bethany looks for a summer job in the café, Lauren arrives and apologises to her. Lauren learns Sarah is in a psychiatric ward and she tricks Bethany to go and look for summer jobs with her. However, Bethany realises Lauren has tricked her when she is later cornered by Lauren and her gang, who taunt her about Sarah and pull her hair. Lauren and her gang leave when Anna Windass (Debbie Rush) interrupts, and Bethany leaves in tears. Kylie comforts her when she finds out she is receiving text messages from Lauren and her gang. Bethany is later devastated when Kylie is stabbed and killed in the street. Bethany and David visit Sarah and tell her about Kylie's death. Sarah wants to leave the unit, but Bethany persuades her to stay and get better for her and Harry. On a home visit, Sarah decides to discharge herself, despite advice from Bethany and Gail.

Bethany takes diet pills after Craig Tinker (Colson Smith) takes a photograph of her when she breaks a swing and posts it online. Bethany collapses at the gym and David's old enemy Gary Windass (Mikey North), who works at the gym, confronts her over the diet pills. Bethany confides in Gary over her GCSE results and Sarah blames herself for Bethany not doing well. At the gym, Lauren arrives and makes cruel remarks, but Bethany hits Lauren, witnessed by Gary. Gary goes to Bethany's school and reports the bullying. Sarah notices Gary with Bethany a lot and after confronting Gary, Bethany admits Gary has been helping her with Lauren and there is a meeting at school the following day. At the meeting, Lauren makes out Bethany is the bully and both Bethany and Lauren are suspended. Bethany helps David out at the salon and Lauren arrives and David gives Lauren a free treatment, but gets Bethany out of the way and threatens her to leave his family alone. Bethany returns to school and learns Lauren is being expelled after others came forward. Sarah finds out about Bethany going running and Bethany tearfully admits to Sarah she counts calories and runs to burn calories. Sarah finds Bethany's diet pills and Bethany promises she no longer takes them.

Bethany arranges for Gary to come to Nick's empty flat after she overhears him talking to his ex-girlfriend Alya Nazir (Sair Khan) about someone he's met, thinking it's her. Sarah and Gary end up together at the flat and presume Bethany knows of their relationship. Bethany witnesses Sarah and Gary kiss on the balcony. Bethany is taken to a gig by Gary with his adoptive sister, Faye Windass (Ellie Leach). Bethany flirts with Gary and lays seductively on Gary's bed and Faye catches her. Bethany gives Faye vodka to keep quiet, but Faye drops hints at dinner. Bethany admits to giving Faye the vodka when she is drunk. An emotional Bethany disappears after Gary rejects her and Sarah contacts the police. Gary accuses Luke of being the older man Bethany has a crush on after Norris witnesses them together. Bethany returns after spending time with a friend and she later takes diet pills. Sarah finds out about Bethany's crush on Gary, but Bethany tries to get over it. She later collapses after taking more pills and is presumably kidnapped. The next day she wakes up in hospital and tells Sarah that Tyrone Dobbs (Alan Halsall) brought her in. Bethany is referred to a primary mental health team and Sarah splits up with Gary.

Bethany tracks the person who found her – a man named Nathan Curtis (Christopher Harper). He allows and encourages Bethany to use his salon to shoot a hairstyle tutorial and he suggests that Bethany should show more of her body in future. Bethany refuses to give Nathan a false alibi when he is arrested on suspicion of abduction. Bethany gets drunk at a bar with Nathan's assistant Mel Maguire (Sonia Ibrahim) and is picked up by Nathan, whom Bethany proceeds to have sex with. Bethany gets a contraceptive implant by persuasion from Mel. Gary and Sarah are introduced to Nathan and they are shocked that he's twice Bethany's age. Bethany later attends a party at Nathan's, where she and Mel are the only females. Nathan takes a photo of a partially-dressed Bethany and sends it to his friend Neil Clifton (Ben Cartwright). Bethany and Sarah argue over Bethany skipping school and wanting a Saturday job, resulting in Bethany moving in with Nathan and refuses to give into Sarah and Gary's pleas to move home. Bethany unknowingly lets a man in the flat, who takes stuff and Nathan is initially angry but gets Bethany to agrees to spend some time and flirt with Neil. Bethany confides in Mary Taylor (Patti Clare) that she thinks Sarah is moving on after seeing Sarah and Gary look at a house. Bethany is forced to have sex with Neil after he flirts with her and she is surprised by Nathan's calm attitude. Bethany leaves with Nathan when he locates her into the flower shop and he ignores Bethany's apologies, and they sleep apart. Bethany asks for forgiveness and Bethany accepts Nathan's marriage proposal, which devastates Sarah, but she chooses to support Bethany.

In Nathan's absence, Sarah visits Bethany, who is drunk and passes out and she and Gary take Bethany home. Bethany agrees to move back home, but she goes into a rage when Sarah and Gary will not let her out, smashing things and stabs Gary in the arm, before running off. Craig finds Bethany under a railway bridge, bleeding, and takes her to hospital, urging her to call Sarah, but she opts to call Nathan. Neil turns out to be a police officer when Sarah and Gary contact the police. Bethany wants to press charges against Sarah and Gary for locking her in, but Bethany is persuaded not to and Nathan takes Bethany to meet Neil and their old acquaintance Ian Yardley (Anthony Bowers) – whom she is urged to thank for collaborating with Nathan in the way how he helped her out. Tensions soon rise when Nathan's former girlfriend Shona Ramsey (Julia Goulding), who is dating David, finds out who Bethany's boyfriend is and orders Nathan to stay away from Bethany. At the party, Nathan continues to give Bethany spiked drinks and he gets angry with Bethany when she argues with Lara Cutler (Niamh Blackshaw), a 14-year-old girl who – unbeknownst to Bethany – is also a victim of Nathan's sexual exploitation, over a necklace. Nathan responds by burning Bethany's arm with a cigarette, but he feigns remorse about it and lures her to return to the party. Bethany later gives Nathan her engagement ring and three men are then sent into a room where Bethany is to have sex with them. Shona, who is beaten up by two men Nathan sent after her, leaves hospital and warns David that she is in trouble. Mel ignores Bethany's pleas for help and David tells Sarah that Nathan has been grooming Bethany. Sarah, David, Gary, and Shona race to the Salon and as they break into the flat, Nathan tries to clear the flat and Sarah finds Bethany upset and with her dress undone. Nathan is arrested for GBH and the sexual exploitation of a child. Bethany does not want to undergo a physical examination and wants to see Nathan, refusing to believe she was groomed. Bethany puts her engagement ring back on.

The police visit the Platts and Bethany overhears the police explaining that the crime will be difficult to prove with Bethany being over the age of consent, but with her testimony, Nathan could be charged with rape or controlled prostitution for gain. Nathan breaks bail by seeing Bethany and Bethany keeps him updated as well as agreeing to keep Nathan's connection with Neil quiet. Bethany makes a move on Peter Barlow (Chris Gascoyne), but he rejects her and Sarah catches Bethany about to self-harm with a cigarette, believing she is in the wrong, not Nathan. Mary catches Bethany trying to leave with her belongings, who is planning to leave with Nathan, and Mary fails to talk Bethany out of going. Bethany finds out she is going to Belgium alone and Bethany asks a family to phone the police. Nathan is arrested and at the police station, Neil threatens Bethany to keep quiet about his involvement, which she does when she is interviewed. Sarah is told by the police that the CPS has dropped the case against Nathan due to lack of evidence, which Sarah passes onto Bethany. Bethany self-harms by picking at her cigarette burn after hearing this news. Sarah arranges for Neil to speak to Bethany and he reminds her to keep quiet, but Bethany finally reveals to Craig that Neil knows Nathan and was forced to have sex with him. Shona tries to talk to Bethany about Nathan, but Bethany believes nothing will change no matter who she talks to. Craig compliments Bethany over her handling of the situation, prompting her decision to get support over what she has been through. Craig gets a recording of Neil confessing to what he and Nathan did, sharing it with Bethany, Sarah and the police, who later inform Bethany the Crown Prosecution Service have a case. Sarah and Bethany go to Weatherfield High to enrol Bethany in the sixth form, but Bethany is annoyed that she would have to retake Year 12, so Audrey offers Bethany an apprentice as a beautician. Mel turns up unexpectedly and tells Bethany that she was one of Nathan's victims, but cannot go to the police and Bethany persuades her family to let Mel stay. Mel secretly contacts Nathan, who wants Mel to keep Bethany away from court and Mel pretends to give into Bethany's persuasion to go to the police. Mel takes Bethany near train tracks and Bethany tries to persuade Mel that she is a victim of Nathan's. Mel allows Bethany to go to court and Bethany becomes emotional when she is cross-examined, feeling she has messed up. Craig, Nathan, and Neil are cross-examined and Bethany and Sarah are relieved that Nathan, Neil, and the other perpetrators are found guilty.

Bethany, Sarah, and Gary go to Milan for a holiday, but Bethany stays on and later tells Sarah that she is staying for good. Bethany soon returns and Mary confides in Bethany about her feud with daughter-in-law Angie Appleton (Victoria Ekanoye), who has accused her of harming her son George Appleton (Romeo Cheetham-Karcz). Bethany goes to the hospital on Mary's behalf and finds out about George's condition. Bethany freaks out when Craig admits he has feelings for her, but Craig is delighted when Bethany agrees to try a relationship with him. Craig and his colleague, Jess Heywood (Donnaleigh Bailey), are called to a lap dancing bar after a reported disturbance and he is shocked to find Bethany working there under the name of Madison. Craig attempts and fails to convince Bethany not to work there, but stands by her choice. Gary visits the club and when he tries to take her home, Bethany alleges assault and watches as security beat up Gary. She tells Sarah that she is working as a lap dancer and still refuses to give the job up as well as threatening Sarah that if she gets together with Gary, she will move out. Bethany is sacked from the club for being underage but returns to the lap dancing club when it is under new management, quitting her apprenticeship with Audrey. When she is chosen to give a private dance for a stag party, she believes that one of the men is Nathan and smashes a bottle in his face when one of the men are rowdy. Bethany is arrested, interviewed with Sarah's presence and charged with GBH, and confesses to Sarah after breaking down that she needs help. Bethany returns to work at the salon. She later starts seeing Ryan Connor (Ryan Prescott) and confesses her ordeal to him when it starts to cause problems in their relationship.

== Reception ==
Upon the character's return in 2015, The Guardian's Hannah Verdier thought that Fallon was "perfect" for the role and that her comedic skills were a "reincarnation of Joan Rivers, only with a Mancunian accent". She also praised the chemistry between Bethany and Sarah writing that "these two are screen gold". Steven D Wright from the same newspaper, however, felt that Fallon was "far too old for her part" and that Bethany didn't sound like someone who spent half of their life in Italy. Laura-Jayne Tyler of Inside Soap praised the character, saying "she's a little firecracker who has us in stitches every episode, and we're not letting her go without a fight."

For her portrayal as Bethany, Fallon was shortlisted for Best Newcomer at the Inside Soap Awards 2015 and Best Actress at the 2017 British Soap Awards and the 2017 TV Choice Awards. In August 2017, Fallon was longlisted for Best Actress at the Inside Soap Awards, while Fallon and Colson Smith (Craig Tinker) were longlisted for Best Partnership. Both nominations made the viewer-voted shortlist. On 6 November 2017, Fallon won the Best Actress accolade. On 23 January 2018, Fallon won Best Serial Drama Performance at the 2018 National Television Awards. On 2 June 2018, Fallon was awarded the Best Actress and Best Female Dramatic Performance accolades at the 2018 British Soap Awards. In July 2018, Fallon was shortlisted for the Best Actress award at the Inside Soap Awards.

== See also ==
- List of Coronation Street characters (2000)
