= Jason Grimshaw =

Fictional character from Coronation Street

- Coronation Street character
- Portrayed by: Ryan Thomas
- Duration: 2000–2016, 2025
- First appearance: 25 December 2000
- Last appearance: 6 June 2025
- Introduced by: Jane MacNaught (2000); Kate Brooks (2025)
- Spin-off appearances: Coronation Street: A Knights Tale (2010); Tram Crash News Flash (2010); Just Rosie (2011)
- Crossover appearances: East Street (2010)
In-universe information
- Occupation: Builder; Businessman
- Father: Tony Stewart
- Mother: Eileen Grimshaw
- Stepfather: Pat Phelan
- Half-brothers: Todd Grimshaw
- Wife: Sarah Platt (2007–2010)
- Stepdaughters: Bethany Platt
- Grandfathers: Colin Grimshaw
- Grandmothers: Kitty Stewart
- Aunts: Julie Carp
- Nephews: Billy Platt
- Other relatives: Arnley Grimshaw; Elsie Tanner; Linda Cheveski; Dennis Tanner; Paul Cheveski; Martin Cheveski; Martin Platt (father-in law, 2007–2010); Gail Platt (mother-in law, (2007–2010); David Platt (brother-in law, (2007–2010); Nick Tilsley (brother-in law, (2007–2010)

Jason Grimshaw is a fictional character from the British ITV soap opera Coronation Street. Portrayed by Ryan Thomas, the character first appeared on screen on 25 December 2000. It was announced in October 2015 that Thomas had quit the role of Jason, and the character departed on 29 June 2016. Thomas reprised the role for a brief stint between 30 May and 6 June 2025, to coincide with the permanent departure of Jason's mother, Eileen Grimshaw (Sue Cleaver).

Jason is the son of Eileen and Tony Stewart (Alan Igbon/Terence Maynard), but he did not know his father for many years. His younger brother is Todd Grimshaw (Bruno Langley/Gareth Pierce). Jason's storylines have mostly revolved around his failed relationships with various women including, Sarah Platt (Tina O'Brien), Candice Stowe (Nikki Sanderson), Violet Wilson (Jenny Platt), Becky McDonald (Katherine Kelly), Rosie Webster (Helen Flanagan), Stella Price (Michelle Collins), Maria Connor (Samia Ghadie) and Eva Price (Catherine Tyldesley). His other storylines have included: being attacked by his enemy Callum Logan (Sean Ward); grieving for his father, Tony, after he dies off-screen; and becoming a suspect in Callum's murder. He leaves Weatherfield after being manipulated by his mother's new boyfriend and later husband, Pat Phelan (Connor McIntyre).

== Development ==
=== Casting ===
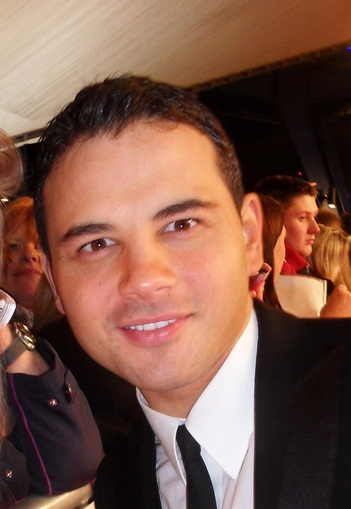
Ryan Thomas has portrayed Jason since he was seventeen.

In late 2000, it was announced that two younger boys were to join the cast of Coronation Street. Ryan Thomas and Bruno Langley were cast in the roles of brothers Jason and Todd Grimshaw, the 17- and 15-year-old sons of Streetcars controller Eileen (Sue Cleaver). Jason was originally going to be called James. The family moved into Liz (Beverley Callard) and Jim McDonald's (Charles Lawson) old house on the street. Producers hoped Thomas and Langley would achieve the same heartthrob status as Adam Rickitt, who played Nick Tilsley for two years before leaving to pursue a pop career. "We thought it was time for some good looking boys," said a spokeswoman.

=== Family ===
The Grimshaws are often portrayed as arguing rivals in their scenes. Jason and his Todd are portrayed as "bickering brothers". Jason is often caring Eileen. Thomas told a reporter from Soaplife that he and Langley were best friends off-screen.

On 15 November 2013, it was announced that Terrance Maynard had been cast as Jason's father Tony Stewart. Tony had been seen in the programme in 2003 played by Alan Igbon. Producer Stuart Blackburn told the official website: "Tony's arrival is going to cause massive ructions for the Grimshaws. He is a man who can be your best friend or your worst enemy, and with a long history of lies and betrayal, this is a guy who has an awful lot of making up to do."

=== Relationships ===
In late 2005, Jason began dating Sarah Platt (Tina O'Brien), they had an on off relationship and were due to marry in 2006. Speaking of the storyline Thomas said: "Jason was thinking about getting married in four years rather than four months. It was just a gesture, and that’s all he wanted it to be. He thought they would just get engaged and they didn’t have to get married for ages yet. It was more of a stepping stone for him. It has come round quickly for Jason, and he is sort of being pushed into it. He doesn’t want to lose Sarah so he is going along with it because he does actually love her." Asked if Jason would settle down Thomas also said: "He's had a bit of a past and he's a bit of a Jack The Lad around Charlie but on this occasion, for once, he's actually showing some grown-up qualities and, when faced with the prospect of losing Sarah, he chose to bite the bullet. There's no grey area with Jason because there's not that much grey matter! Everything's in black and white. It's either marry Sarah and keep her or don't marry Sarah and lose her forever." Speaking about if Jason will also be able to handle Bethany, Thomas said: "He certainly will – he pulls her to one side during the ceremony and makes her a pledge. He realises he can't have Sarah without Beth – they come as a package." The storyline resulted in Jason leaving Sarah and also resulted in Sarah leaving the street for a new life abroad with Beth. leaving Jason alone and upset.

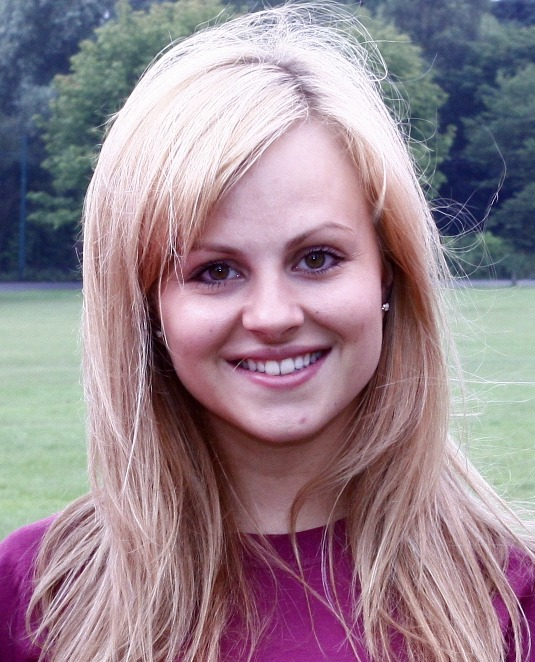
Jason had a relationship with Sarah Platt played by Tina O'Brien (pictured).

In 2009, Jason began dating David Platt's (Jack P. Shepherd) ex-girlfriend Tina McIntyre (Michelle Keegan). Speaking of the storyline, Thomas said "I just thought it was really good for their storylines because I knew it'd bring the Platts and the Grimshaws back together in their usual warring ways. Who could forget the famous fight on the cobbles between Gail and Eileen? I think at some point that'll come again. There's always banter from one side of the Street to the other." Asked what attracts Tina to Jason, Thomas replied: "I think it's because she's quite full-on with Jason. She made a big effort with him in the beginning, so he just played off that and spiced up his life a bit in the process. He wanted a bit more fun than just sitting there having a pint in The Rovers every day." It all came a little out of the blue, did not it? "Yeah, Jason completely wasn't aware that Tina fancied him. She had to come onto him to make him realise, but as soon as he got the sign, he was in there! It doesn't take him long to get his pants off! I think Jason was playing with the situation a bit as well to see what he could get out of her. When he started getting the right signals, he just thought 'I might as well have a go'. They seem to be very happy at the moment."

In 2010, Jason began a relationship with Rosie Webster (Helen Flanagan). Teasing the storyline, Thomas said "It's going to be a very feisty, sexy relationship between the two characters." Asked if the Jason and Rosie pairing could work, Thomas admitted that with Jason's track record anything could happen. In October 2010, Flanagan commented on the storyline: ""Trust the writers to give it to me! I didn't have time to worry about it – or hit the gym! Ryan and I are like brother and sister so the first kiss was weird, but once we got that out of the way it was fine. "It wasn't as passionate as it looked as Ryan was in agony from an infected tooth. But I'm glad Rosie has got a boyfriend – it shows she has a heart.". In December that year Jason rescues Simon Barlow from No.13 after it caught fire after the Joinery exploded.

In February 2012, Thomas said he wants "fun" times for Jason after the departure of Rosie. In an interview with Lorraine about what could be next for Jason, Thomas commented: "I know the direction it's going. I'm not allowed to say too much about it, but I know that they're putting me with [different] people and I don't know what's going to happen there. But that should be exciting for him. I just want Jason to have a bit of fun. He's been tied to that relationship and he always seems to get into relationships too quickly." Thomas also added that he will miss Flanagan following her departure from the series. He added: "In real life, she is the funniest person ever. We will [miss her], yeah. Obviously a lot of people come and go over the years, but when you work so closely with someone… She's a massive character and she will be missed. They've kept the door wide open for Helen. People like to spread their wings, go out there and see what the real world is about, because we're a big bubble in that show. We wish Helen all the best."

In 2012, Jason began a relationship with ex-girlfriend Maria Connor played by Samia Ghadie, Thomas praised the plot: "She was one of the first girls he ever went out with. I think he's just done a big round circle and come back. It's been great, I've enjoyed working on it. They've got all the right qualities to last as a couple but you just do not know. Couples do not seem to last too long on Corrie and if they do, there's always things that get in the way of relationships in soaps, so we'll wait and see". Ghadie revealed that filming the scenes with Thomas was more awkward than romantic as she and Thomas are good friends and revealed that it was like kissing her brother.

On 26 June 2013, it was reported that Jason would have a new romance. Asked who Jason's ideal woman would be, Thomas told the Sunday Mirror: "I'd pick Deirdre. I love Annie [Kirkbride] and we have a right good laugh. I think that would be quite funny. Or Liz McDonald. I'm really pleased Bev [Callard] is coming back. That would cause problems for Steve and I'd love that, to be sat there with his mum on the couch." It was later revealed that Eva Price (Catherine Tyldesley) would be Jason's new love interest despite Jason recently being in a sexual relationship with Eva's mother Stella (Michelle Collins). It was revealed that Stella would be livid that her daughter is dating her ex, but eventually calms down as she already has enough to worry about as her killer partner Karl Munro (John Michie) has left the street in dramatic circumstances. Speaking of the romance, Tyldesley said to ITV: "She's never really entertained the thought of anything serious with Jason in the past, obviously especially because he used to be with her mum. But she just begins to see that he's a really genuine, nice sweet guy. "Whilst Jason and Eva are trying to help Stella out, there is a little bit of flirting that starts, and Sean kindly points out to Eva how fit Jason is! She continued: "We can expect, as always, a lot more drama for the Prices. Obviously Jason used to be with Stella, so when Stella finds out that there's a little bit of cavorting going on between him and her daughter, things might blow up a little bit. God knows what Gloria's going to say!"

=== Departure ===
On 7 October 2015, it was announced that Thomas would be leaving the soap at the end of his contract. In a statement, Thomas explained: "It has been a great privilege to be in Coronation Street for the past 15 years. The cast and crew are amongst the best in the business and to have had the chance to be a part of it for so long has been an amazing experience. The decision to leave was an extremely difficult one but I felt that now was the right time to spread my wings and try other roles. I'm just excited now to see what exit storyline the writers give Jason." Producer Stuart Blackburn said: "Ryan has been an important part of Coronation Street for 15 years. We wish him every success when he moves on next year and we appreciate his desire to try new things." He departed from the show on 29 June 2016.

== Storylines ==
Jason is the eldest son of Eileen Grimshaw (Sue Cleaver) and Tony Stewart (Alan Igbon/Terence Maynard). Jason does not know his father for many years, but they reunite in 2003. Upon his arrival, he is an aspiring runner – something which Eileen does not completely approve of. He works for a brief period in Sally Webster's (Sally Dynevor) electrical shop in 2001 until the failing business catches fire and is permanently closed down. He finds a traumatised Toyah Battersby (Georgia Taylor) lying in the ginnel, following her rape in April 2001, whilst out jogging early one morning.

Although Jason has had many romances, all of them were short-lived since he has a fear of commitment. He has had many flings with street residents, Candice Stowe (Nikki Sanderson) and Sarah Platt (Tina O'Brien). He seemed to have settled down with Violet Wilson (Jenny Platt), even uncharacteristically promising to care for her when he thought she was pregnant. Jason is stunned to learn about Violet sharing a drunken kiss with his enemy/employer, Charlie Stubbs (Bill Ward). He attempts to continue the relationship but is unable to forgive Violet and ends their relationship. During their separation, he starts dating Sarah and despite reconciling with Violet, he continues his affair with her. Eventually, Violet discovers the affair and dumps Jason. Separated from Violet again, Jason and Sarah continue their relationship, much to the dismay of their mothers. Their relationship struggles initially as Sarah feels insecure about his feelings for Violet and the fact he proposed to Sarah while still with Violet, leading to a showdown in which Sarah ends her relationship with Jason in the Rovers. After days of constant quarrels, Jason ultimately decides to get back with Sarah and after she refuses to speak to him, Jason breaks into her house and proposes. She accepts, although they suffer further disapproval from their mothers. They announce their engagement in the Rovers in Violet's presence, which Sarah wants to do to make a point. The wedding, though, is a disaster. Jason develops cold feet and flees through a toilet window at the venue, leaving Sarah heartbroken. After months of ignoring Jason, Sarah reunites with him. However, on Christmas Day 2006, Jason has a major surprise delivered to the front door in the shape of a baby – supposedly his little girl by a young woman called Emma (Stephanie Waring). It later turns out that baby Holly is the baby of Charlie.

Out of revenge for his family disowning him, David loosens the bolts on the scaffolding at the builder's yard on 22 October 2007, a week before Jason and Sarah's wedding. Later, David decides that it was a bad idea, however he gets to the builder's yard to see Jason leaning on the balcony. When Bill jumps out as a joke, Jason falls onto the street below. David had loosened the scaffold bolts. In the hospital, Jason is told that he might not walk again for some time. He is on crutches at his and Sarah's wedding.

Sarah asks Jason to take her wedding dress to the cleaners but he accidentally leaves it in Roy's Rolls where David picks it up and puts it in a puddle before putting it in a bin bag with other bits and pieces that the Morton kids get from their neighbours. The Mortons' Guy Fawkes gets first prize and, as the dress burns, Sarah recognises it as her wedding dress before Jason admits that he lost it. Sarah knows immediately that David was responsible. Jason, Sarah and her daughter Bethany (Amy & Emily Walton) are set to leave for Milan on 30 December 2007, after Sarah gets a job from her uncle Stephen (Todd Boyce). Jason backs out when Sarah admits that she planted drugs in David's drawer at the salon, thereby ruining his chances of Stephen offering him the job in Italy.

On New Year's Eve 2007, Jason and Becky Granger (Katherine Kelly) kiss as the midnight bells chimes, and on 1 February 2008, they have sex. Jason regrets it afterwards and visits Sarah in Milan to tell her he had cheated on her with Becky. Instead of forgiving him, she attacks him, giving him a black eye. When he returns to the Street, Becky hits him too.

Several months later, Jason and Becky have sex again and they become a couple. However, they argue when Jason wants a night in alone. In October 2008, Jason discovers that Sarah is considering coming home. He immediately phones her and she agrees to give him another chance. Meanwhile, he is preparing to move in with Becky but dumps her and flies to Italy. Becky later attacks him in the Rovers for his betrayal. Everything backfires for Jason when he subsequently discovers that Sarah has decided to reconcile with her Italian boyfriend, just as he is going to Milan to meet her. On 16 February 2009, Jason and Becky sleep together and reunite after revealing that he and Sarah are divorcing. To prove to Becky that he is serious this time, he proposes and she accepts. Unfortunately, Steve McDonald (Simon Gregson) also proposes to Becky and although she initially decides to marry Jason, she realises she can not go through with it and calls off the engagement.

In June 2009, Jason sleeps with David's ex-girlfriend Tina McIntyre (Michelle Keegan). They start dating, however when Tina tells David the truth about her and Jason, he turns nasty and starts throwing bricks at Jason. Jason fights back and the pair have to be separated by the locals. Tina and Jason buy No. 12a Coronation Street and move in together in July 2009. Jason and Tina redecorate the flat and hold a house-warming party in September 2009 but in November, a loan shark named Rick Neelan (Greg Wood) fakes interest in buying the flat, when he is actually waiting for Tina's father, Joe (Reece Dinsdale), about the debt he owes him. Before Christmas 2009, Tina and Jason row after it is discovered that Jason is still married to Sarah. In retaliation, she shares a kiss with Nick Tilsley (Ben Price), his brother-in-law. They reconcile however, and in January 2010, when Joe and Gail go on their honeymoon, he asks Jason to look out for Tina, who is in danger from the loan sharks. On 12 February, Jason gives Tina a Valentine's Day present of his divorce papers to Sarah. Tina thinks that is her full Valentine's Day present and goes to get alcohol to celebrate. When she returns, Jason proposes to her after she has seen the ring and she accepts. However, following Joe's sudden death, Tina struggles with her grief and ends her engagement to Jason and he moves out of the flat, though he reclaims it.

On 2 April 2010, Jason gets drunk in the Rovers after Tina calls off their engagement. He later returns to the builder's yard where he is told to go home. However, when he turns to leave, Jason falls down the stairs and is rendered unconscious. He is taken to the hospital where he appears to be fine, apart from losing the memory of him and Tina breaking up. Eileen, worried about what he'll do, visits Tina's house where she informs her of Jason's amnesia, but Tina doesn't believe her. Jason's memory soon returns.

Upon finding out Tina is now dating Graeme Proctor (Craig Gazey), he is angry that Tina slept with Graeme while she was with him and locks her out of the flat. Then he teams up with David (who was Graeme's best friend) to humiliate Tina and Graeme further; first by David using Graeme's clothes to mop up water (Graeme had handcuffed David to the Platts' radiator, and David then pulled it off the wall.) David then cut the hoods off Graeme's hoodies and the peaks off his caps and Jason throws binbags of Tina's clothes on top of her from the house's windows, all in front of a crowd. Satisfied, David and Jason end their partnership but remain close friends.

On 24 September 2010, Jason is recruited by a half-naked Rosie Webster (Helen Flanagan) to drive her in her father Kevin's (Michael Le Vell) car to Sheffield to pick up her sister Sophie (Brooke Vincent) and her girlfriend Sian (Sacha Parkinson) after they ran away together. Immediately, there is chemistry between the pair; on 18 October, Rosie books Owen Armstrong (Ian Puleston-Davies) to come round and redecorate the kitchen after the oven catches fire whilst Sally and Kevin are away. On the 21st, whilst Jason is busy with the Websters' kitchen, and Rosie is looking for a cab to take her to an important modelling job, she mentions that it is 'underwear modelling', so Jason offers to be her driver. With Jason not knowing what a 'green screen' is and the male model going AWOL, Rosie volunteers Jason to step in, and the pair complete the photoshoot together; with Jason looking very pleased with himself when they get home, they sleep together. The next day, Jason thinks he has done something wrong as Rosie is evasive and not paying him for the work he did on the kitchen; she eventually pays him and he buys her a 'fake' version of the handbag that she wanted and the pair sleep together again and agree to start dating.

When the Joinery bar exploded, bringing a tram off the viaduct which smashes into the Corner Shop and The Kabin, Jason helps to rescue people who are trapped, including going into No.13 (which is in flames) to find Simon Barlow (Alex Bain). He finds him in a cupboard upstairs and they both escape, assisted by the fire brigade. Upon escaping, he is thanked gratefully by the Barlow family and praised by the residents for his courage. With Jason and Rosie living together, they start the new year looking out for Sophie and Sian as they get kicked out of the Websters. When Graeme convinces Claire to run away after she admits to the police that she attacked Tracy Barlow (Kate Ford), Jason helps her and her sons escape and drives her to the airport, on 14 January. On 17 January, Eileen's money troubles get a lot worse, and number 11 starts crumbling around her; she seeks help from an insurance firm but when Jason spots a man lurking at the back of the house, he thinks he is trying to spy on Rosie and punches him, only to discover that he is the insurance inspector, which of course, affects the result and Eileen can not claim a penny.

On 4 February, after Rosie agrees to go to a "mother and baby" photo shoot, which "pays a fortune", they convince Kevin to let them have Jack for the day but disaster strikes when they accidentally bring home a baby girl. Jason spots this, and just as they are about to swap the babies back, Kevin walks in and demands the truth. Jason admits what happened and Kevin goes looking for his son. He finds Jack but warns Rosie to stay away, expressing his disappointment in her. Despite this, Jason is good friends with Kevin and supports him when he wins £200,000 on a scratchcard. When Kevin is almost crushed to death at the garage when his new car ramp malfunctions, Jason joins Rosie and her family at the hospital. Kevin orders Jason to call the ramp manufacturers to find the fault and threaten legal action if necessary. When it's revealed that the ramp was damaged deliberately, Jason is shocked and disgusted that someone would try to kill Kevin.

In June, Jason celebrates his 28th birthday and Becky hosts a party for him in the Rovers. However, she orders a stripper and the party turns to all-out mayhem when Chris Gray (Will Thorp) has a go at Frank Foster (Andrew Lancel). A fight breaks out and this leads to a whole pub brawl, with Jason caught in the middle, things sent flying, the brawl going onto the street and a chair smashing the window. Though Jason is shaken, he is fine. In November 2011, Rosie tells Jason that she is showing a potential buyer around their flat (which they are selling), but they are unaware that the mystery buyer is actually Rosie's ex-kidnapper, John Stape (Graeme Hawley), who has returned to kidnap Rosie as he blames her for his wife, Fiz, being imprisoned for his crimes. Rosie and Jason have a brief argument which leads to her storming off to show 'Mr Chips' around the flat. Meanwhile, Jason informs Kevin that Rosie never returned from the flat viewing and he is concerned. Jason and Kevin hear Rosie's screams and find her bound and gagged in the flat and Kevin chases after John, who then crashes his car and dies later in hospital. Jason apologises to Rosie for abandoning her and says he'll never do it again. Rosie gets an offer for a show in London however she has to be single to enter the show. She realises she has to follow her career and breaks up with Jason.

Jason rekindles his relationship with Maria Connor (Samia Ghadie) however she later shares a kiss with her gay best friend Marcus Dent (Charlie Condou), who is actually dating Aiden. They later fail to resist temptation and sleep together. The pair dump their boyfriends, Aiden and Jason. Realising they are in love, they agree to give their relationship a go. In December 2012, Jason starts a relationship with Stella Price (Michelle Collins), after repairing a water leak in the Rovers, yet she rekindles her relationship with Karl Munro (John Michie). However, Jason is convinced that Karl is responsible for starting the fire at the Rovers Return which killed Sunita Alahan (Shobna Gulati). He tells Sunita's husband Dev Alahan (Jimmi Harkishin) and he initially ignores him. But, as clues build up, he begins to believe him. Just after Karl and Stella's wedding takes place, Dev locks himself in the newly built Rovers Return and he confesses to killing Dev's wife Sunita. Meanwhile, Jason is at the police station reporting Karl for murder. In the pub, Dev begins to punch Karl and he retaliates by smashing him around the head with a bottle. Stella enters through the back of the pub and finds Dev on the floor surrounded by shattered glass. Karl refuses to let her call an ambulance and locks her in the basement. The police arrive at the pub and Karl is arrested. Dev recovers quickly. Impressed by his concern for her mother Stella, Eva Price (Catherine Tyldesley) shares a kiss with Jason in September 2013, and they later begin a serious relationship.

In 2014, Tony (Terence Maynard) turns up at the Eileen's house, wanting to rekindle his relationship with Jason. He begins a relationship with Eileen's friend, Liz McDonald (Beverley Callard), and she is angry to discover that Tony is giving Liz more attention than he is his own son. Tony, still not convinced that he is a good enough father, decides to purchase the builder's yard from Owen, who is desperately trying to pay off his £80,000 debt. When a £75,000 deal is reached, Tony signs the builder's yard over to Jason, to say sorry for not watching him grow up. He also buys the flat next door, which he rents to Andy Carver (Oliver Farnworth) and Steph Britton (Tisha Merry). Tony begins to work at the builder's yard with Jason, taking on an executive role. They later employ Jason's friend, Gary Windass (Mikey North) and Zeedan Nazir (Qasim Akhtar), as labourers. After Jason's brother, Todd, returns to Weatherfield, Tony employs him, as a secretary at the builder's yard, but he puts the company at risk, after ordering cheap materials to make a loft conversion for Jason's friend, Tyrone. Matters turn worse when Tyrone falls through the roof, breaks his ribs and sues 'Jason's Construction'. When Jason discovers what Todd has done and that Jason and Gary knew what he was up to, he fires all three of them, leaving only Zeedan working at the builder's yard and, unable to live in the same house as Todd, for what he has done, Jason moves into the flat above the kebab shop with Eva. After realising that what happened to him was not Jason's fault, Tyrone decides to accept Tony's £5,000 compensation and forgives Jason.

When Todd is disowned by Eileen, he moves into a run-down flat, but he later gets a job at Barlow's Buys, impressing Eileen, who realises that he is trying to make amends, but Jason is not convinced. Eileen agrees to lunch with Todd, at 'Nick's Bistro', but when Jason talks her out of it, Todd realises that he has been stood up and heads home. As Todd walks home, he is attacked by a gang of youths and ends up in hospital, where he discovers that his face will be scared for life. Eileen and Jason, believing that Todd truly wants to change, forgive him and he moves back in with Eileen. However, Todd vows revenge on the pair, for not turning up to lunch at the bistro, as he thinks that they are the reason that he was attacked. As time passes, Eva plans for her and Jason to buy a house, but after Jason reveals that he cannot afford it, Eva asks Tony to lend them the deposit, to which he agrees. When Tony and Eva attend an auction at a hotel, Todd lets on to Jason that they are having an affair, to which Jason goes to the hotel and punches Tony and calls Eva a 'dirty slag'. When Jason realises that he has made a mistake and that Tony and Eva were actually planning on buying a house, to surprise him, Eva dumps Jason, for not trusting her. Although he pleads for her forgiveness and even proposes to her, Eva decides to leave for France, in order to think things through, but Jason is devastated, after discovering from her sister, Leanne Tilsley (Jane Danson), that Eva is now happily engaged to a French man.

In August 2015, Jason stands up for Sarah against Callum Logan (Sean Ward), but the result of this leads to Jason getting beaten up by Callum and two of his goons. Jason is left in a critical condition as a result, having to receive vital surgery on a clot on his brain. He regains consciousness a week later and tells Tony and the police he thinks he heard Callum's voice. Jason spends two more weeks in hospital. In September, he gets Callum's home address from David Platt (Jack P. Shepherd) and hides in his flat. However, Denton arrives and demands money from Callum, but Jason's phone rings, alerting them to his presence. Jason punches Callum after Tony arrives to take him home.

Eva returns in September 2015 and rekindles with Jason, however she becomes upset when Jason throws her out for feeling sorry for him. In 2016, Jason found out that his father Tony had died of a heart attack. Jason blamed Liz McDonald for Tony's death, which he said that if it was not for Liz, Tony would not have left and that Tony's death would have been prevented. In May 2016, after being rejected by Eva, he took Callum's friend Gemma Winter (Dolly-Rose Campbell) home with him. In the coming weeks, Callum's body is found buried under Gail Rodwell's granny annex. He is initially a suspect for Callum's murder, but is ruled out when they believe the lie that it was Tony who killed him. Gemma then tells him she knows it's not his fault but he should watch his back as his dad "did it" and people will take revenge on him. His van is soon torched and he believes it is retaliation from one of Callum's friends, but it is actually his mother's partner Pat Phelan (Connor McIntyre) who is pretending that it's them to scare him and take his business. Phelan tells him he should leave to which he agrees and lets him 'look after' the business, unknown that he is actually conning him; even though Todd has figured him out. Before going, he goes to say goodbye to Sarah in a mental hospital where she has been committed because of being paranoid over Callum (unbeknown to Jason, she witnessed his murder at the hands of her sister-in-law, Kylie, played by Paula Lane) and being diagnosed with postpartum psychosis. He goes back home and says an emotional farewell to Todd, Eileen and Sean before going to Thailand.

== Reception ==
Thomas was nominated for the "Sexiest Male" accolade at the 2008, 2009, 2010, and 2014 British Soap Awards. Laura-Jayne Tyler from Inside Soap joked that Jason had the "Best Torso" of 2016 Coronation Street.
