= Sarah Platt =

Fictional character from Coronation Street

- Coronation Street character
- Tina O'Brien as Sarah Platt (2024)
- Portrayed by: Leah King (1987); Lynsay King (1987–1999); Tina O'Brien (1999–present)
- Duration: 1987–2008, 2015–present
- First appearance: 2 February 1987
- Introduced by: John G. Temple (1987); Stuart Blackburn (2015)
- Book appearances: Coronation Street: The Complete Saga (2008)
- Spin-off appearances: Coronation Street: Pantomime (2005)
- Crossover appearances: Corriedale (2026)
- Lynsay King as Sarah Platt (1995)
In-universe information
- Other names: Sarah Tilsley; Sarah Grimshaw; Sarah Barlow
- Occupation: Waitress; Hair stylist Shop assistant Businesswoman; Barmaid; Personal assistant Management at Under World Factory
- Father: Brian Tilsley
- Mother: Gail Platt
- Adoptive father: Martin Platt
- Stepfather: Richard Hillman; Joe McIntyre; Michael Rodwell; Jesse Chadwick
- Brothers: Nick Tilsley
- Half-brothers: David Platt
- Half-sisters: Charlotte Platt (adoptive)
- Husband: Jason Grimshaw (2007–2010); Adam Barlow (2020–2024)
- Sons: Billy Platt; Harry Platt
- Daughters: Bethany Platt
- Grandfathers: Bert Tilsley; Ted Page
- Grandmothers: Ivy Tilsley; Audrey Roberts
- Uncles: Stephen Reid
- Nephews: Max Turner (adoptive); Sam Blakeman
- Nieces: Lily Platt; Harper Platt
- Other relatives: George Shuttleworth

Sarah Louise Platt (also Tilsley, Grimshaw, and Barlow) is a fictional character from the British ITV soap opera Coronation Street. She was born on-screen during the episode broadcast on 2 February 1987. She was played by Leah King in 1987 and by Lynsay King from 1987 until 8 October 1999 when King opted to leave to focus on her education. Tina O'Brien took over the role on 31 October 1999; she opted to leave in 2007 and made her final on-screen appearance on 30 December 2007, although she made some brief voice-over appearances the following month. A number of false rumours about O'Brien returning to the role surfaced during her absence from the serial. In October 2014, it was announced that O'Brien would reprise the role, with Sarah returning on 30 March 2015.

Sarah is the daughter of Gail Platt (Helen Worth) and Brian Tilsley (Christopher Quinten), sister to Nick Tilsley (Warren Jackson, Adam Rickitt, Ben Price), half-sister to David Platt (Thomas Ormson, Jack P. Shepherd), granddaughter to Audrey Roberts (Sue Nicholls), Ted Page (Michael Byrne) and Bert (Peter Dudley) and Ivy Tilsley (Lynne Perrie) and mother to Bethany (Mia Cookson, Amy & Emily Walton, Lucy Fallon), Billy and Harry Platt.

== Creation and casting ==
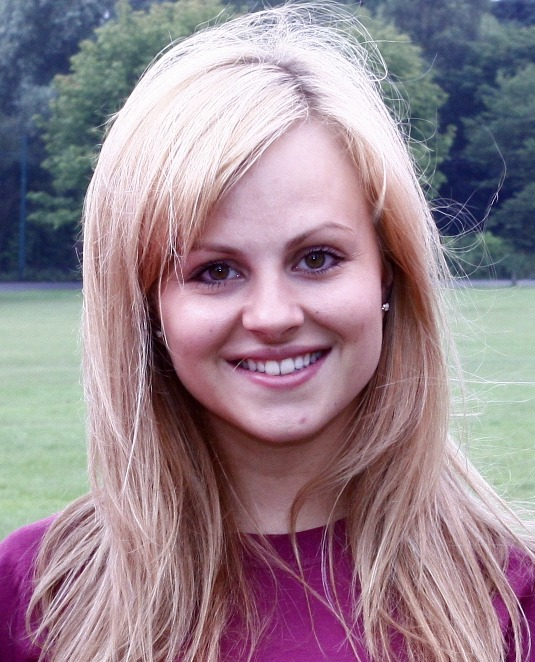
Tina O'Brien (pictured) has portrayed Sarah since the age of sixteen.

The character of Sarah was created as the daughter of Brian and Gail Tilsley. The character was born on screen. Sarah was played by Lynsay King from 1987 to 1999. Lynsay's twin sister Leah, who died of cot death in 1987, alternated in the role of Sarah with Lynsay for a brief period until her death. In 1999, Tina O'Brien was recast in the role. O'Brien was given the part when she was 16, playing the character who was still only 12 at the time. She left the role in 2007, but has said that she would consider returning to the role in the future. O'Brien confirmed her return to the serial in October 2014, with her returning to filming in February 2015, and appearing on-screen from March 2015 onwards.

== Development ==
=== Teenage pregnancy ===
The character's teenage pregnancy storyline was created to highlight the risks of teenage pregnancy. However, the storyline was highly controversial, as it was suggested that it glamorised the issue. Despite this, it has been praised for its message. Actress Tina O'Brien has revealed that she was "naive" over the plot at the time of filming, oblivious that it would create much controversy. The storyline has been discussed in Television and criticism published by Intellect Books, which talked about the character and the storyline's impact.

=== Internet grooming ===
In May 2001, it was revealed that Coronation Street would feature a storyline in which the issue of paedophiles "grooming" kids over the internet would be played out with Sarah. In the storyline, Sarah turns to the internet in her bedroom as a way of meeting people. While visiting chatrooms, she is befriended by a 16-year-old boy who shares her interests and sends her a photo of himself. It turns out, however, that it is a man posing as a 16-year-old and when he persuades Sarah to meet him face-to-face, she finds herself in a very dangerous situation. A spokeswoman for Granada confirmed that the writers would be talking to the Home Office regarding the story. "We have been in touch with the Home Office," she said. "But it is very difficult at the moment with the election on and the government in purdah. We hope to work with it afterwards though." The spokeswoman said they hoped to highlight the issue of internet crime, given recent publicity by the Tonight with Trevor MacDonald show and TV presenter Carol Vorderman. The show should also prove a far more effective measure in tackling concern over internet chatrooms than either the melodramatic outpourings of celebrities or the authoritarian and legislative approach of the government. "Sarah is hugely popular and a great role model for teenagers," the spokeswoman said. "No matter how many politicians talk about the problem, they will never beat a peer in getting the message across. Plus, we know that many parents and kids watch the show side by side. Hopefully, we will spark some debate and then we would have done a good public service." It's hard to argue with that logic. However, while the show should do more to make kids aware of the potential dangers of chatrooms, we remain concerned that it could also be used to kick up a storm that will see unnecessary and draconian legislation pushed through on a wave of public worry.

=== Relationship with Todd Grimshaw ===
Sarah begins a relationship with Todd Grimshaw (Bruno Langley) after he ends his relationship with Sarah's best friend Candice Stowe, portrayed by Nikki Sanderson. Sarah later ends their relationship because she wants to date Ade Critchley (Dean Ashton). O'Brien and Langley were in a relationship and she told Frances Traynor from the Daily Record that acting out their break-up was not strange.

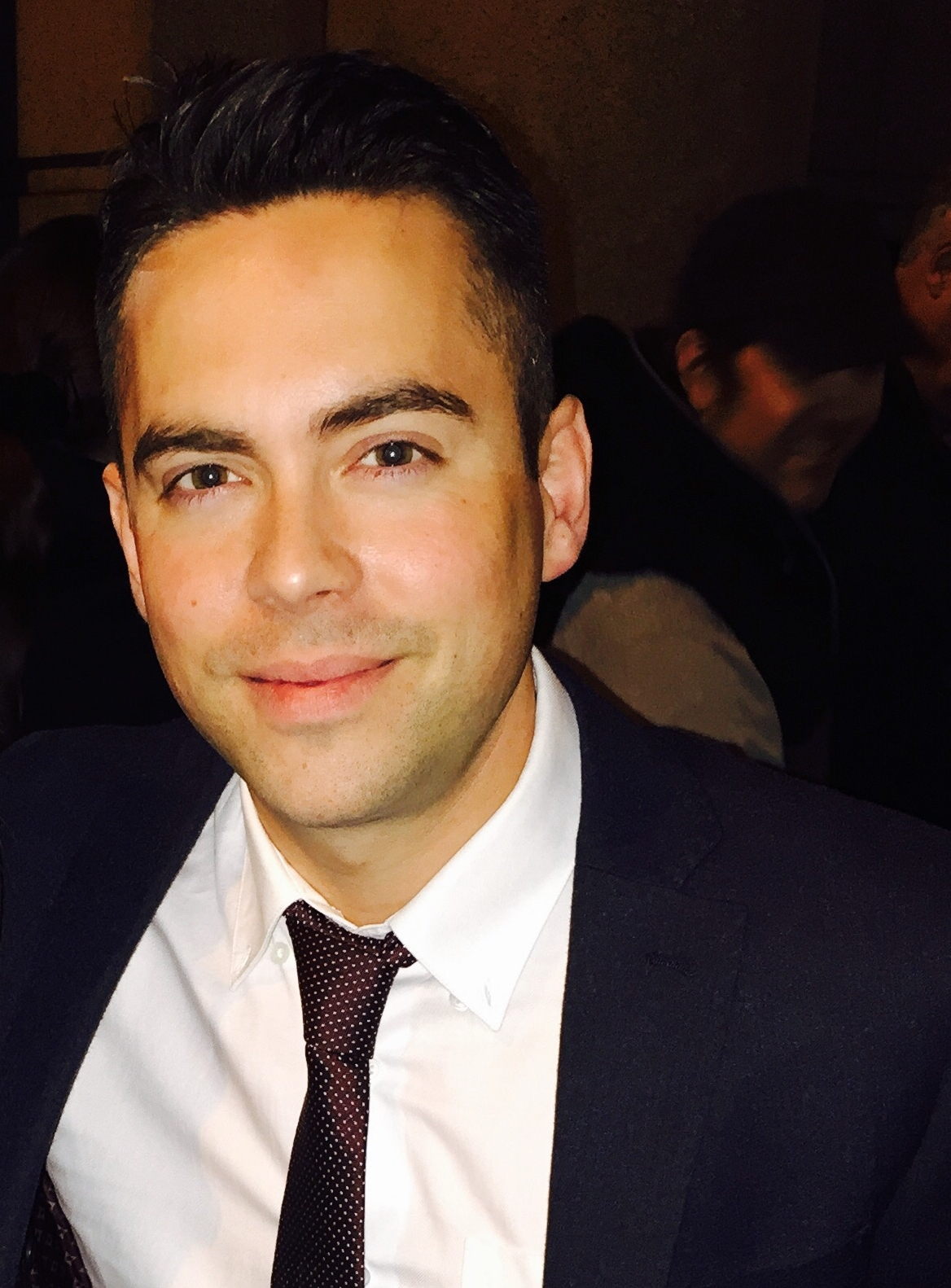
Sarah had a relationship with Todd Grimshaw, portrayed by Bruno Langley (pictured).

Todd then resumes his previous relationship with Candice. However, Sarah soon returns to Todd, and she decides to sleep with him on her sixteenth birthday. The storyline was controversial, and nine viewers contacted the Independent Television Commission. The organisation investigated the scenes, and cleared Coronation Street of breaching guidelines. They praised them for building a relationship between the two characters and viewed it as a mature decision. O'Brien told Steve Hendry from the Sunday Mail that Sarah is "a bit dependent on Todd". In June 2003, Alex Tate from The People reported that Sarah-Louise would dump Todd. Sarah fears that she and Bethany are preventing Todd from succeeding at Oxford University. However, Sarah and Todd move into a flat together. Sarah's daughter Bethany Platt (Amy and Emily Walton) electrocutes herself, and Todd finds her unconscious. The accident prompts Gail Platt (Helen Worth) to involve the social services.

In March 2003, Polly Graham from the Sunday Mirror reported that executive producer Kieran Roberts wanted Todd to become the show's first gay character. The show confirmed that they had discussed the possibility, but nothing had been decided yet. On 22 August 2003, it was reported that Todd would befriend Sarah's brother, Nick Tilsley (Adam Rickett) and kiss him, however, he does not reciprocate. A show spokesperson said that the storyline was a "groundbreaking move" and predicted a varied and "huge reaction" from viewers. While kissing Karl Foster (Chris Finch), Todd sees Sarah approaching, and is "mortified", but she fails to notice Todd and Karl's kiss.

The storyline sparks a fight between Sarah's mum Gail and Eileen Grimshaw (Sue Cleaver). Gail brands Todd a "two-timing, twisted, lying pervert" and the two proceed to pull each other's hair out in the street.

=== Relationship with Jason Grimshaw ===
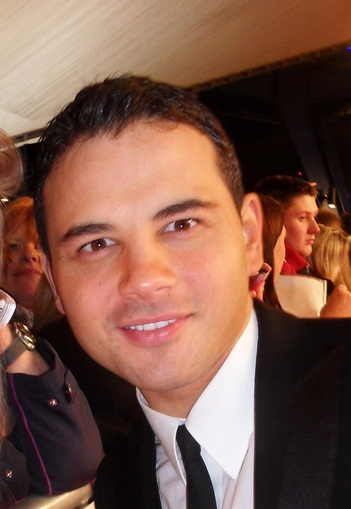
Sarah began a relationship and later went on to marry Jason Grimshaw, portrayed by Ryan Thomas (pictured).

In late 2005, Sarah began dating Todd's half-brother, Jason Grimshaw (Ryan Thomas). They had an on-off relationship and were due to marry in 2006. Speaking of the storyline Ryan Thomas said: "Jason was thinking about getting married in four years rather than four months. It was just a gesture, and that's all he wanted it to be. He thought they would just get engaged and they didn't have to get married for ages yet. It was more of a stepping stone for him. It has come round quickly for Jason, and he is sort of being pushed into it. He doesn't want to lose Sarah so he is going along with it because he does actually love her." Asked if Jason would settle down, Thomas also said: "He's had a bit of a past and he's a bit of a Jack The Lad around Charlie but on this occasion, for once, he's actually showing some grown-up qualities and, when faced with the prospect of losing Sarah, he chose to bite the bullet. There's no grey area with Jason because there's not that much grey matter! Everything's in black and white. It's either marry Sarah and keep her or don't marry Sarah and lose her forever." Speaking about if Jason will also be able to handle Bethany, Thomas said: "He certainly will – he pulls her to one side during the ceremony and makes her a pledge. He realises he can't have Sarah without Beth – they come as a package." The storyline resulted in Jason leaving Sarah and also resulted in Sarah leaving the street for a new life abroad with Beth.

=== Departure ===
In April 2007, it was announced that O'Brien had quit her role as Sarah. Speaking of her reason for quitting, O'Brien said: "This has been an extremely difficult decision to make. I love playing Sarah and have had an amazing seven-and-a-half years in Coronation Street. But I feel that the time has come to see what else is out there for me as an actress". She also thanked the producers and the writers for giving her fantastic storylines during her stint on the show. She also revealed that she will miss everyone. Producer Steve Frost commented on her departure: "Tina is a fabulous actress and we will be sorry to see her go. However, we fully understand her ambition and desire to play other roles". O'Brien's departure scenes aired on 30 December 2007. Sarah's voice was heard on Jason's phone on episodes broadcast on 4 and 6 January 2008. In February 2011, O'Brien revealed that leaving Coronation Street was the right decision, she went on to say: "Leaving Corrie was the hardest decision I ever made, but it was the right one," she said. "I'm really glad I've had the opportunity to do different things. I still watch the show occasionally and get sucked in instantly". O'Brien later reflected on her decision to leave, saying: "I was very young when I started. If I'd have stayed much longer I wouldn't have had the confidence to ever go," she explained. "At Coronation Street, you are protected – it's very much a bubble. That's lovely, but I'd never been a jobbing actress and I really needed that."

In March 2008, it was reported that O'Brien was "seriously" considering a return to the soap just three months after leaving as she "struggled" to find acting work since an appearance in a Christmas pantomime. Ryan Thomas, who was O'Brien's boyfriend at the time, stated that he would "love" her to make a return to the soap so that they could work together again. It was reported again in July 2009 that she was to return to the role of Sarah for an "explosive" Christmas storyline in December 2009, but O'Brien denied these rumours, saying that she was not going to make a comeback "anytime soon".

In November 2011, the Daily Star revealed that Coronation Street producer Phil Collinson was planning on bringing back O'Brien and Nikki Sanderson who played Candice Stowe between 1999 and 2005 in a bid to fill the gap left by the departures of Helen Flanagan who played Rosie Webster and Katherine Kelly who played Becky McDonald. A source told the paper: "He's aware that Sarah-Lou and Candice were hugely popular characters. He thinks it would be a ratings winner to bring them back. Losing Katherine and Helen is a big blow to the show, so Phil wants to beef things up a bit with the return of a couple of big names." O'Brien revealed in January 2012 that bosses had not approached her about a return to the soap. O'Brien has since revealed that she is worried that another actress might take over the role of Sarah. In December 2012, a reporter from The Sunday Mirror reported that O'Brien would reprise her role in 2013, but the actress later denied the report.

=== Reintroduction ===
On 23 October 2014, it was announced that O'Brien had reprised her role and that Sarah would be returning to the show in Spring 2015. Speaking about her return, O'Brien said "I am delighted to be returning. Sarah has a lot of history and unfinished business on the street and I'm looking forward to finding out what she's been up to and why she's returned home." O'Brien returned to filming on 2 February 2015. Helen Worth who plays Sarah's mum Gail Platt spoke of O'Brien's return on ITV breakfast show Good Morning Britain saying: "I am absolutely delighted. I found out yesterday for sure and I can't wait to welcome her back."

Discussing in an interview with Digital Spy about how she felt about being back on the show, O'Brien said: "It's lovely. I thought I was going to walk in and feel very much like the new girl, but actually I did a scene in the Platts' the other day and it was strangely normal, almost like someone was going to pinch me and say, 'You've been in a coma for seven years!' It was really odd, but nice." Asked how the return came about, she replied: "Well, I had been to see [Coronation Street producer] Stuart [Blackburn] and we had some chats, but then I was in the process of having a baby so it was slightly put on hold. After I had Beau, it was then brought up again and I said, 'Oh yes, I'd love to'. It was nice actually, as it meant that I could have this really precious time with my little boy but I also knew that I was going back to something as well. There are things Sarah hasn't finished with David, Jason, her mum – and obviously now this whole new dynamic of Bethany. It's so exciting to be part of the Platts, so I jumped at the chance." O'Brien revealed that she was nervous about returning after being away from the serial for several years: "I was really nervous as it has been so long, but the second the scripts came through, it was really quick. When I did the scenes with Jack [P Shepherd, who plays David] and Helen [Worth, who plays Gail] and everyone, it was really nice. Sarah has got a little bit older and wiser during her time away. She has mellowed, but she's still very outspoken. I think she thinks Weatherfield is a little bit beneath her. She struts back in, she's been working in fashion, she sees David and she is like, 'Oh my gosh, you are still living with your mum'. There is still a soft side of her and you see some really nice scenes with her daughter."

With the announcement of Sarah's return soon came the announcement of her daughter Bethany's return with Katie Redford being cast in the role. Speaking of the announcement, Redford said: "Until I'm actually on set, I genuinely don't think it will sink in that I'm joining the cast of Coronation Street. I know it sounds clichéd but it really feels like a dream come true. Bethany Platt is going to be such a fun and witty character to play and I hope everyone enjoys her return as much as I'm going to!" It was later revealed that Redford would be replaced in the role of Bethany with Lucy Fallon taking over the role. Speaking of her casting, Fallon commented: "Walking onto the set was surreal and nerve wracking, but everyone has been really welcoming and I am thrilled to have been given this great opportunity." Bethany made her return on screen on 20 March 2015, while Sarah made her return on 30 March 2015.

=== The Platts vs Callum Logan ===
In February 2015, producer Stuart Blackburn revealed that Sarah would embark on a relationship with Callum Logan, portrayed by Sean Ward, who is the ex-boyfriend of David's wife, Kylie Platt, portrayed by Paula Lane, and an enemy of David's. "David's got massive problems, because over the weeks Callum's taken a real liking to Max and Max is actually his biological son," Blackburn told ITV. "And he's got almost as many rights to Max as David does. On the seemingly good news front is the return of Bethany and Sarah, but very quickly Callum takes a real liking to Sarah. It's a liking that is returned, so huge problems for David!" Speaking to Digital Spy at the TRIC Awards, Ward said of the storyline: "It's quite exciting. That's the Coronation Street I remember with Sarah-Lou in it. For her to be back in it now and me to be dating her is a bit crazy for me, but very enjoyable. Tina is so professional. She said she was nervous for the first scene and then it's like she's never been away. And I think that's because of the family that we are on Coronation Street, that I've been accepted into. It is just so easy to slip back into it." Asked whether Callum's interest in Sarah-Lou is really genuine, he replied: "Half and half. I mean there's the element that it's David's sister and that's going to help Callum's way on the street, but she's very feisty and he needs someone to match him, and I think Sarah-Lou is the girl to do that." Speaking of the storyline in an interview O'Brien said: "I think it will be interesting to see a more daring side to Sarah. Because she had a baby quite young, she had to be more responsible back then. It's really nice to be working with Sean Ward. I'm sure people think it's funny that the second she walks in, she hooks up with the guy who will cause most problems with the family. "To begin with she isn't interested in Callum at all. It's only because David really gives her a hard time that it almost pushes her towards Callum. She even says, 'Don't tell me what to do or else I will do the opposite' because David is like 'You stay away'. She was going to stay away but David's attitude changes her mind!" Speaking of what Kylie's reaction to the Sarah and Callum relationship O'Brien said: "I don't know how Kylie is going to feel about the whole Callum situation. I think Sarah might be burning her bridges there. When Kylie comes back, they are an item. Can you imagine? 'Hi, happy maternity, I am with your ex!'" O'Brien revealed that Sarah would continue to see Callum following their relationship being exposed, She said: "I think that's what she is hoping for! In her head she thinks they could play happy families – she's ten steps ahead! She's really torn. I don't think Sarah actually harbours bad feelings towards her brother anymore so it's difficult. She does say to Callum at one point that he's won and her brother has lost, so she does show Callum support. But I think she's trying to be neutral for David too." Sarah and Callum later break up and Sarah is furious to discover that Bethany has been delivering drugs on Callum's behalf. Sarah also later joins sides with David and Kylie following Callum threatening her and beating up her ex-husband Jason Grimshaw (Ryan Thomas).

=== Callum's murder and cover-up ===
Coronation Street aired a special live episode to celebrate the sixtieth anniversary of ITV. In the episode, Callum and Sarah argue inside the Platt's home. Callum attacks Sarah, overpowers her and threatens her life. Kylie Platt (Paula Lane) walks in on the struggle and hits Callum over the head with a wrench. Her actions leave Callum bloody and dead on her kitchen floor. The live episode concluded with David returning home to the fatal scene. He decides to help Kylie and Sarah to conceal Callum's murder. He wraps the body up and puts him down a manhole in their garage. The following episode features the trio plotting to dispose of Callum's body in a public space. An ongoing conversion of the garage in a bedroom extension poses a problem and they need to move quickly, but a series of events ruin their plans. Kylie and David are physically sick when they first try to remove the body from the man hole. They are later interrupted by a visit from the police who investigate Callum's abandoned car. Gail then hires Jason Grimshaw (Ryan Thomas) to cover the manhole up with concrete, unaware Callum is concealed inside.

The show planned a dramatic stunt which would lead to the discovery of Callum's corpse. The scene featured Carla Connor (Alison King) causing a car accident, colliding with Tyrone Dobbs' (Alan Halsall) truck which crashes into the Platts' home. This causes the floor to give way and a recovery team unearthing Callum's body. Producers decided to conclude the story without Kylie being held accountable for the murder. Instead they used a character that had been recently killed off, Tony Stewart (Terence Maynard), who had publicly feuded with Callum. When Sarah confesses the truth to Todd, he decides to frame Tony for the crime – a scheme which proved successful.

=== Pregnancy and postpartum psychosis ===
On 15 October 2015, it was reported that there would be a shock twist in the recent Callum murder storyline with Sarah finding out she is pregnant with his baby. An ITV insider reportedly said: "It is a great twist by Corrie bosses. Sarah will be left with a heartbreaking dilemma about whether or not to keep evil Callum's baby. The decision threatens to tear the Platt family apart as they are already struggling to cope with keeping Callum's death a secret and now have this bombshell." Speaking about discovering her character was pregnant with Callum's baby, O'Brien said: "I literally gasped. Then I shuddered at the thought of being 'pregnant' again, and when I was expecting my second child Beau, I was just massive and uncomfortable towards the end."

Speaking of Sarah's reaction to the pregnancy O'Brien said: "She's absolutely stunned, "One she's been checked after being run over, the doctor tells her she's absolutely fine – and so is her baby! She obviously knows that the baby is Callum's. Sarah's devastated and she feels so shocked and foolish. It's horrendous for her." O'Brien went on to say: "She's completely torn. Keeping the baby will mean having a reminder of Callum with her every day and having to live with what's happened even more than she already has to. Sarah would have to lie to her child for its entire life and she wonders whether she would be able to do that." David's wife, Kylie, later finds out about the pregnancy, and O'Brien said "Kylie finds out because Sarah is acting really shifty. She's making secret phone calls to the clinic because she's unsure about what to do. And that's how Kylie finds out. Weirdly, it's Kylie who's been on Sarah's side more than David. So I think Kylie will prove to be a support network for Sarah."

Following Sarah giving birth to a baby boy named Harry, it was revealed that Sarah would talk to Callum's dead body as her anxiety increases. Sarah attempts to seek help by confiding in Kylie that she can't bear to be in the same house as Callum's corpse and can't stop thinking about him. Sarah later carries Harry into the annexe where she talks to Callum's corpse. O'Brien responded to the criticisms that Coronation Street has been copying EastEnders with soap fans noting the similarities to Stacey Branning's (Lacey Turner) postpartum psychosis storyline. On the comparisons, she told the Daily Star Sunday: "It's a shame. I'd be lying if I said it wasn't. Lacey Turner is a fantastic actress. But this is very different. Stacey's got bipolar, whereas Sarah's psychosis is centred around Callum. There were thoughts about her having post-traumatic stress disorder. But because she's had a baby and because she's got the trauma of what's gone on with Callum, it will be classed as post-natal psychosis." O'Brien also noted that the storyline has been "the hardest thing I've ever done" and she's felt a huge responsibility to get it right.

== Storylines ==
=== 1987–2008 ===
Sarah is born prematurely in February 1987, and questions are raised about her paternity, due to Gail's affair with Brian's cousin, Ian Latimer (Michael Loney) and Brian rejects Sarah, believing she was not his daughter, until a blood test reveals otherwise. Her birth reunites Gail and Brian after their divorce; however, Brian dies in February 1989 after being stabbed by a group of thugs. Gail then starts a relationship with Martin Platt (Sean Wilson). Their son David is born on Christmas Day 1990, and they are later married. Brian's mother, Ivy Tilsley (Lynne Perrie), tried to fight against Martin adopting Nick and Sarah, as their names would change from Tilsley to Platt. Despite trying to fight the adoption, Nick and Sarah were allowed to be adopted. Gail and Martin's marriage eventually broke up a decade later.

Sarah subsequently befriends Candice Stowe (Nikki Sanderson). After her 13th birthday in February 2000, Sarah discovers that she is five months pregnant. Her daughter Bethany Platt (Mia Cookson) is born in June 2000. Bethany's father, Neil Fearns (Paul Holowaty), has no interest in his daughter, but when Neil dies in a car crash in September 2003, Sarah takes Bethany to his funeral and makes friends with Neil's mother, Brenda Fearns (Julia Deakin). This nearly leads to Bethany's death, when Brenda tries to commit suicide with Bethany, fearing that Bethany is being raised in a house of sin. However, Emily Bishop (Eileen Derbyshire) finds them and stops Brenda before harm is done.

Sarah becomes rebellious at the age of 15, splitting from her boyfriend Todd Grimshaw (Bruno Langley) in 2002 and moving on to Aiden Critchley (Dean Ashton), who takes her joyriding and crashes the car, leaving Sarah with severe head injuries. She survives and dumps Aiden, disgusted that he had left her for dead in the wreckage.

Sarah reconciles with Todd, and they move into the flat above the bookmakers, causing problems between Gail and Sarah, particularly when Sarah tells her that she is pregnant in late 2003. She is unsure about having the baby, but Todd convinces her to go ahead, and they get engaged, despite their families' disapproval. However, Sarah is unaware that Todd is struggling with his emerging gay feelings, and he begins an affair with Karl Foster (Chris Finch). When Sarah finds out in May 2004, she dumps him, and suffers a placental abruption shortly afterwards. She has to have an emergency caesarean and her baby son, Billy, dies soon after he is born in June 2004. Sarah blames Todd, and refuses to allow him to attend their son's funeral, but Todd ignores her and goes regardless.

Sarah dates Scooter Makuna (Sushil Chudasama), before embarking on a more serious relationship with Todd's brother, Jason Grimshaw (Ryan Thomas), destroying his relationship with Violet Wilson (Jenny Platt). Sarah and Jason get engaged, but once again, their families oppose the marriage. Jason gets cold feet on their wedding day and jilts her at the altar. It takes Sarah time to forgive him, but they eventually reconcile and the wedding is re-organised.

Sarah's relationship with David is strained when Bethany takes an ecstasy pill that David had hidden in one of her dolls, and nearly dies. Sarah forbids David from attending her wedding, while Gail kicks him out. The pair continue to bicker continuously with each other up until Sarah's wedding day in October 2007, when he attempts to kill himself. The police interrupt the ceremony to inform the Platt family of the attempted suicide; Sarah marries Jason regardless, knowing it is just a stunt to ruin her wedding.

Shortly afterwards, Gail's brother Stephen Reid (Todd Boyce) visits and offers David a job in Milan. Jealous, Sarah sabotages this by planting drugs on him, so Stephen withdraws the offer and offers it to Sarah instead. She accepts, and she, Jason and Bethany leave for the airport to fly to Milan. However, at Manchester Piccadilly, Sarah tells Jason that she planted the drugs on David. Disgusted, he walks away, leaving Sarah to fly to Milan alone with Bethany in December 2007.

=== 2015–present ===
Bethany (now Lucy Fallon) returns to Weatherfield in March 2015 without Sarah's permission. A furious Sarah soon follows to take her back to Milan, but Bethany refuses to leave, and eventually, after losing her job, Sarah announces that they are moving back to Weatherfield. Sarah begins a relationship with Callum Logan (Sean Ward), a drug dealer who is in the middle of a custody battle with David over his son and David's stepson Max Turner (Harry McDermott). Sarah later breaks up with Callum when she learns of his true colours, following a gun being found in Max's bedroom. She tells the police about the gun, but he is not charged; Callum swears revenge on the Platt family.

Callum later tells David and his wife and Max's mother Kylie Platt (Paula Lane) that in exchange for £20,000, he will be out of their lives forever. Callum turns up at the Platt house, where he takes Sarah hostage. When she tries to escape, he attacks and attempts to rape her, but is stopped when Kylie arrives and hits him over the head with a wrench, killing him instantly. Sarah is left in shock, and is forced to help cover up his murder.

Callum's murder leaves Sarah traumatised. Sarah drunkenly stumbles into the street and is hit by a van. She is taken to hospital, where she discovers she is four months pregnant with Callum's baby. She decides to have an abortion, but Kylie later talks her out of it. Sarah later goes into labour five weeks early and gives birth to a son, who she names Harry Platt. Sarah becomes paranoid, thinking Harry can sense Callum's presence. Following the discovery of Callum's body under the floor in the Platt household, Sarah confesses to Todd that she knows how Callum died. Todd then comes up with a plan to blame Callum's murder on Jason's deceased father Tony Stewart (Terrance Maynard). Sarah later becomes increasingly disturbed, thinking Callum is still alive and planning to kill her. She is taken to a psychiatric unit and diagnosed with postpartum psychosis.

Sarah starts a relationship with Gary Windass (Mikey North) after he helps Bethany, who is experiencing school bullying. Sarah ends it when she discovers that Bethany has a crush on him. Bethany later overdoses on exercise pills, but she recovers and encourages Sarah to get back together with Gary. Sarah discovers that Bethany is in a relationship with Nathan Curtis (Christopher Harper), who is much older than her. Sarah does not approve of the relationship, and takes a strong disliking to Nathan, but accepts that it is Bethany's decision, taking her to the doctors for contraception.

She later finds out that Bethany is being groomed, and Nathan is subsequently arrested, with Bethany moving back in with her mother. Sarah throws Gary out, having been told he had a one-night stand with Nicola Rubinstein (Nicola Thorp) and got her pregnant. Sarah decides to get back with Gary after forgiving him for getting Nicola pregnant.

In February 2020, Sarah marries Adam Barlow (Sam Robertson). In April 2023, she begins an affair with Damon Hay (Ciarán Griffiths) as Adam himself divorces from Sarah in 2024. In June 2026, it is revealed that Sarah was responsible for the murder of Theo Silverton (James Cartwright).

== Reception ==
Sarah's underage pregnancy storyline was praised by the UK government, when public health minister Yvette Cooper said the show should be applauded for raising the issue in front of a mass audience.

For her portrayal of Sarah, O'Brien was nominated in the category of Most Popular Newcomer at the National Television Awards in 2000. She was nominated for Best Actress at the 2005 British Soap Awards. O'Brien was also nominated for Best Actress at the 2016 Inside Soap Awards. Her portrayal of Sarah in her psychosis storyline earned her the award for Best Performance in a Continuing Drama at the RTS North West Awards 2016. O'Brien stated that she was "proud" to win the award, with her colleague Jane Danson, who was also nominated for the award, congratulating her on the win. O'Brien was also longlisted for "Best Actress" at the 2026 Inside Soap Awards.
