= Nikki Sanderson =

British actress (born 1984)

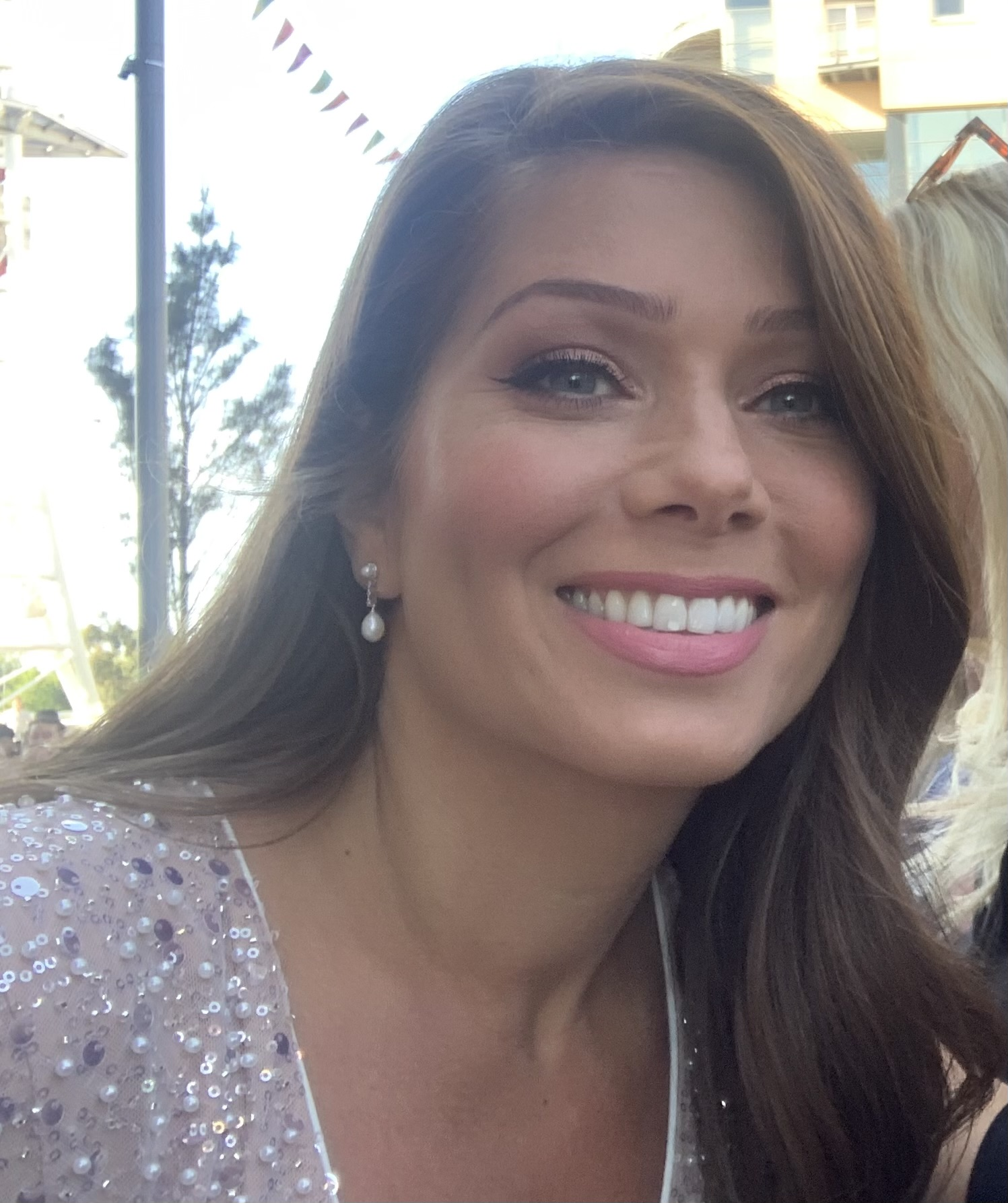
- Sanderson in 2023
- Born: 28 March 1984 (age 42); Blackpool, Lancashire, England
- Occupations: Actress; television presenter
- Years active: 1999–present
- Known for: Coronation Street (1999–2005); Heartbeat (2008–2009); Hollyoaks (2012–2025)
- Partner(s): Danny Young (2005–2009); Anthony Quinlan (2022–present)
- Children: 1

Nikki Sanderson (born 28 March 1984) is an English actress who is known for playing Candice Stowe in the television soap opera Coronation Street (1999–2005), Dawn Bellamy in Heartbeat (2008–2009) and Maxine Minniver in Hollyoaks (2012–2025). During her time at Coronation Street and since, she has also been a television presenter on programmes such as CD:UK, Junior Eurovision: The British Final and Ministry of Mayhem.

== Career ==
Sanderson joined Coronation Street in 1999 and left in autumn 2005, when her character left Weatherfield to become a stylist for Status Quo. Prior to this, she had appeared in children's drama Children's Ward and in 2004, the hit fitness DVD Coronation Street: Funk Fit.

Since leaving Coronation Street she has appeared in episodes of the BBC television series' Holby City and New Street Law alongside fellow Coronation Street alumni Chris Gascoyne and Chris Bisson. In 2006, Sanderson appeared in a touring production of The Vagina Monologues with Jerry Hall amongst others and an episode of Kay Mellor's Strictly Confidential.

A keen singer, and karaoke enthusiast, Sanderson has made several television appearances singing, such as ITV's Madonna Mania, Discomania, Abba Mania 2 and Celebrity Stars in Their Eyes, where her impression of LeAnn Rimes, singing the theme from the film Coyote Ugly, Can't Fight the Moonlight earned her the winner's spot. She has also appeared on The X Factor: Battle of the Stars in the solo 16–24 category, mentored by Sharon Osbourne where she was eliminated fifth. At the time, though, Sanderson was suffering from tonsillitis and was straining her voice to sing.

For 2006 and 2007, she was signed by sports fashion footwear brand KangaROOS for their new print advertising campaign.

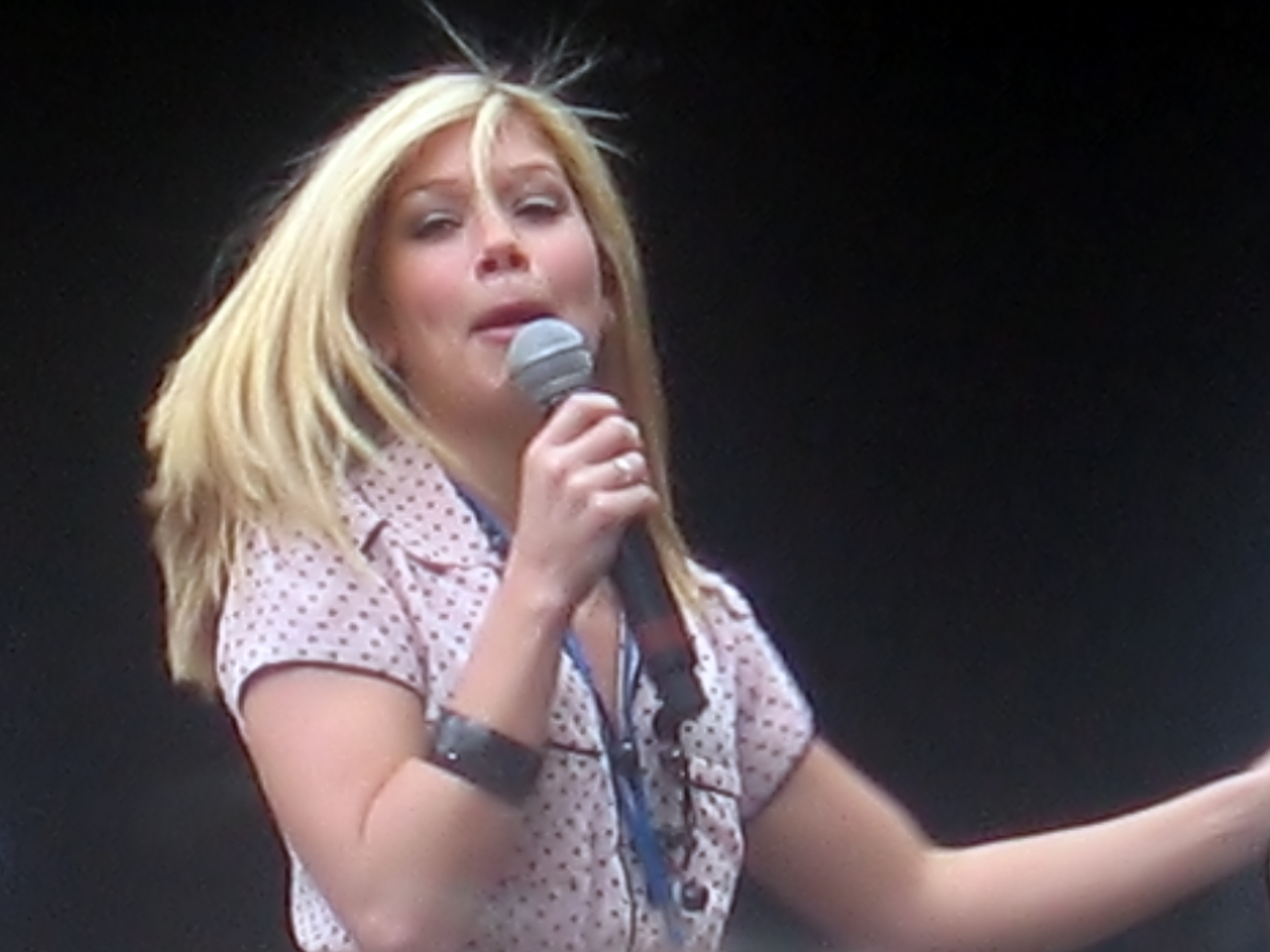
Sanderson in 2007

In June 2007, it was reported that Sanderson would make a brief return to Coronation Street in autumn 2007, when her character, Candice Stowe, turns up during the build up to Sarah Platt's (Tina O'Brien) wedding. However these reports were later dismissed by Sanderson during an appearance on ITV's Loose Women.

She appeared in the "Tuareg Productions" play Living Under One Roof at the Theatre Royal, Nottingham from 26–30 June 2007.

Sanderson appeared in the second series of All Star Family Fortunes which aired on 25 December 2007. She made a second appearance on the first edition of the quiz's fourth series, on 20 September 2009, as part of a team representing Heartbeat.

In 2008, she joined the cast of the ITV1 series, Heartbeat, set in the 1960s, to play the part of Dawn Bellamy, PC Phil Bellamy's niece. She plays the part of Audrey in the horror film Boogeyman 3 released in 2009. She plays the character Gee Gee, a dance teacher, in the 2008 film Clubbed, an underworld drama set in the early 1980s.

Sanderson featured in the 2010 UK tour of The Vagina Monologues.

In September 2012, it was announced that Sanderson had joined the cast of Hollyoaks as Maxine Minniver. Sanderson's first episode was aired on 5 November 2012.

In December 2012, Sanderson appeared in pantomime as Peter Pan at the Gracie Fields Theatre in Rochdale.

In late 2013, Sanderson, along with her Hollyoaks co-star and on-screen boyfriend Jeremy Sheffield, appeared in character as their Hollyoaks characters Maxine and Patrick in a series of government "This is Abuse" adverts, highlighting the issues of domestic violence.

For her portrayal of Maxine, Sanderson received nominations for the "Best Actress" award at the British Soap Awards 2014 and 2015. She was also nominated for "Beat Serial Performance" at the National Television Awards 2015.

== Personal life ==
Nikki Ann Sanderson was born on 28 March 1984 in Blackpool, Lancashire, England. Sanderson dated her former Coronation Street co-star Danny Young from 2005 to February 2009. Since January 2022, Sanderson has been in a relationship with former Hollyoaks and Emmerdale actor, Anthony Quinlan. On Christmas Eve 2025, she announced that she is expecting her first baby with Quinlan in 2026. Sanderson gave birth to her son in April 2026.

In 2023, Sanderson pursued a failed civil action against Mirror Group Newspapers in the High Court alleging phone hacking. Despite evidence showing that she had been illegally targeted by the publisher, the judge found her claim was made out of time, beyond the six year statute limit.

== Filmography ==
Film
Year	Title	Role	Refs.
2008	Clubbed	Gee Gee	
2008	Boogeyman 3	Audrey	

Television
Year	Title	Role	Notes	Refs.
1999–2005	Coronation Street	Candice Stowe	Series regular, 397 episodes	
2000	Children's Ward	Abbie	1 episode	
2005	Coronation Street: Pantomime	Candice Stowe	TV movie	
2006–2007	New Street Law	Sammy Dean	3 episodes	
2006	Holby City	Monica Southworth	1 episode	
2006	Strictly Confidential	Tiffany	2 episodes	
2007	The Afternoon Play	Natalie Bucklethwaite	1 episode	
2008–2009	Heartbeat	Dawn Bellamy	Main cast, 30 episodes	
2012	Casualty	Amy Harris	1 episode	
2012	Crime Stories	Chelsea Lewis	1 episode	
2012–2025	Hollyoaks	Maxine Minniver	Series regular, 500+ episodes	

== Awards and nominations ==
Year	Award	Category	Work	Result	Ref.
2001	TV Quick Awards	Best New Actor/Actress	Coronation Street	Nominated	
2005	The British Soap Awards	Sexiest Female	Coronation Street	Nominated	
2014	The British Soap Awards	Best Actress	Hollyoaks	Shortlisted	
2014	TV Choice Awards	Best Soap Actress	Hollyoaks	Shortlisted	
2014	Inside Soap Awards	Best Actress	Hollyoaks	Won	
2014	Digital Spy Reader Awards	Best Female Soap Actor	Hollyoaks	Third	
2015	20th National Television Awards	Serial Drama Performance	Hollyoaks	Shortlisted	
2015	The British Soap Awards	Best Actress	Hollyoaks	Shortlisted	
2015	TV Choice Awards	Best Soap Actress	Hollyoaks	Shortlisted	
2015	Inside Soap Awards	Best Actress	Hollyoaks	Shortlisted	
2015	RTS North West Awards	Best Performance in a Continuing Drama	Hollyoaks	Nominated	
2016	The British Soap Awards	Best Actress	Hollyoaks	Nominated	
2023	2023 British Soap Awards	Best Dramatic Performance	Hollyoaks	Nominated	
2023	National Television Awards	Serial Drama Performance	Hollyoaks	Longlisted	
2023	Inside Soap Awards	Best Actress	Hollyoaks	Pending	
2023	TVTimes Awards	Favourite Soap Actor	Pending		
