= Paul Holowaty =

English actor

Paul Holowaty (born 7 March 1985) is an English actor. He was born in Bolton, and is probably most well known for his role as racist bully Steven "Macki" Mackintosh in popular soap opera Hollyoaks. In 2010, he made his West End debut in the musical Wolfboy at the Trafalgar Studios in London. He made his debut on American television in 2016 appearing in NCIS. He is currently filming a series regular role in a new series about EDM DJs called CVNT5, written by and starring Gareth Emery.

== Career ==
In 2000, he appeared in Coronation Street as Sarah Platt's boyfriend Neil Fearns - he got her pregnant with daughter Bethany aged 13; but he was killed in a road accident in 2003.

In April 2005, he was cast as a non-regular character Macki in Hollyoaks. Story lines that involved him include blowing up the science lab, the racist bullying of Ali and Darlene Taylor and getting fatally stabbed by Ali before Ali himself was killed by an oncoming car. He appeared in 30 episodes.

He then went on to appear as Gavin, a character with a STD in BBC hospital drama Holby City. Gavin was a young boy interested in gardening, and was doing a course at college in the subject.
