= Danny Young (actor) =

English actor (born 1986)

- Born: 7 November 1986 (age 39); Essex, England
- Occupations: Actor, dancer, model, personal trainer
- Years active: 2001–2020
- Television: Kerching! (2003–2006); Coronation Street (2004–2006); Dancing on Ice (2010)
- Partner(s): Nikki Sanderson (2005–2009); Chloe Madeley (2013–2014)

Danny Young (born 7 November 1986) is an English actor. He is best known for his portrayal of Warren Baldwin on the popular long-running soap Coronation Street, and for his participation in the celebrity ice skating show Dancing on Ice.

== Acting career ==
Young appeared on Coronation Street, playing Warren Baldwin from August 2004 to August 2005, until dropped by the show's bosses due to the character's storyline coming to an end. Young then returned to the soap for several episodes in 2006. Before appearing on Coronation Street and given a regular role, Young played Dean in Out of Control which won him the Best Young Actor award in the drama category (2002){drama category for which award?}, and Ricardo on the CBBC series Kerching! (2003). He also had roles in "The Vice" (2003), the award-winning Gone (2003) (a short film) and Wall of Silence (2004). He has since gone onto appear in the horror film Exposé (2009), the directorial début by Martin Kemp from Spandau Ballet, and The Rapture released in 2010. Also in 2010, he co-produced and starred in the horror film Stalker, which was again directed by Martin Kemp. Also in 2011, Young announced he had joined the cast of Wildboyz, an adult comedy theatre show, in which he will perform some scenes nude. The production toured the UK from April to June 2012.

== Other career ==
In July 2013 Young launched FitnessFondue.com, a fitness and nutrition advice website with his then girlfriend Chloe Madeley. Young and Madeley regularly posted tips, advice and their own success stories.

== Dancing on Ice ==
In 2010, Young participated in the fifth series of the ITV1 show Dancing on Ice with professional skater Frankie Poultney. He came fifth in the competition. He was eliminated on 14 March 2010 during prop week after he lost out to Hollyoaks' Kieron Richardson and his professional partner Brianne Delcourt because of the "damn hat" to quote Christopher Dean, after Young dropped his hat during his skate off performance.

== Television appearances as himself ==
In 2006, Danny participated in the British football television series The Match. In 2007, Danny participated in Celebrity United football matches, along with footballing professionals and showbusiness personalities to support various national and local charities. Since August 2010, Young has presented the fitness and health segment on the ITV show This Morning. In 2011, Danny participated in the "Celebrity Christmas Pantomime Special" series of Come Dine with Me. He featured in five episodes between 25 and 30 December 2011, highlighting his cooking skills.

== Personal life ==
In August 2010, Danny was named Mr Jersey Battle of Flowers 2010 in their annual procession.

From 2013-4, he was in a relationship with Chloe, daughter of Richard Madeley.

== Filmography ==
Year	Title	Role	Notes
2020	24 Little Hours	DI Green	Film
2019	Deep Cuts	Charlie MacKenzie	2 episodes
2014	Dead Wood	Lance Corporal Masters	Film
2012	Crime Stories	Jamie Wilkinson	1 episode
2012	Payback Season	Ian	Film
2011	A Landscape of Lies	Eion	Film
2011	Casualty	Kevin Brannigan	"One Good Day" Episode
2010	Stalker	Josh	Co-producer
2010	The Rapture	Gates	Film
2010	Dancing on Ice	Himself	Contestant, 5th place overall
2009	Exposé	Josh	Film
2004–2006	Coronation Street	Warren Baldwin	73 episodes
2003–2006	Kerching!	Ricardo Murray	20 episodes
2005	Coronation Street: Pantomime	Warren Baldwin	TV movie
2004	Wall of Silence	Ryan Moorville	TV movie
2003	Gone	Boy	Short Film
2003	The Vice	Sean	"Gameboys" Episode
2002	Helen West	Young Boy	"Deep Sleep" Episode
2002	Out of Control	Dean	TV movie
2001	The Bill	Sean	"Another Country" Episode
