= Tina O'Brien =

British actress

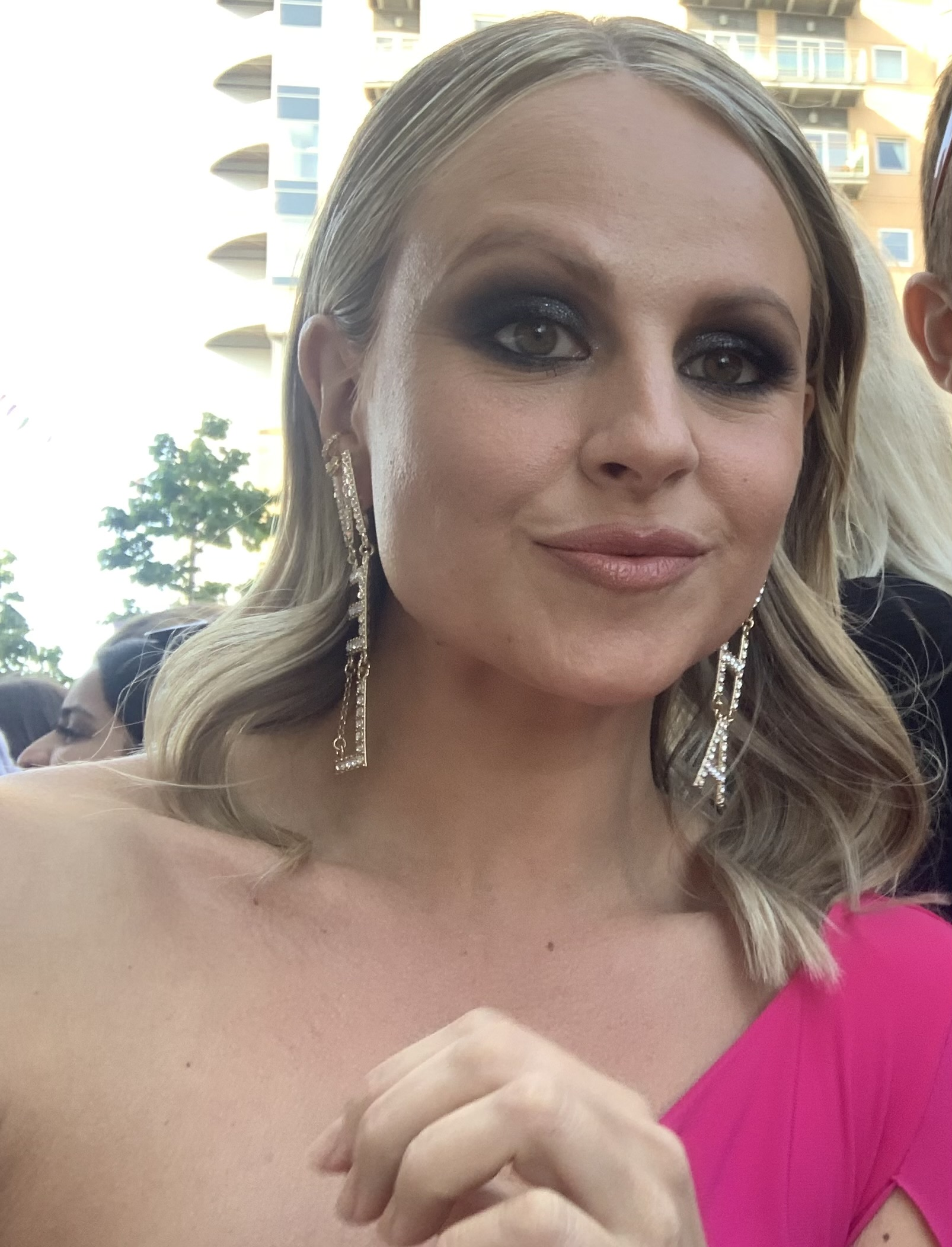
- O'Brien in 2023
- Born: Tina Michelle O'Brien; 7 August 1983 (age 43); Rusholme, Manchester, England
- Occupation: Actress
- Years active: 1997–present
- Television: Children's Ward (1997); Coronation Street (1999–2008, 2015–present); Waterloo Road (2010–2011); Strictly Come Dancing (2010); Casualty (2011, 2014)
- Spouse: Adam Crofts (m. 2018; sep. 2025)
- Partner: Ryan Thomas (2003–2009)
- Children: 2

Tina Michelle O'Brien (born 7 August 1983) is an English actress. She is best known for her portrayal of Sarah Platt in the long-running ITV soap opera Coronation Street (1999–2008, 2015–present). She also appeared in the BBC One drama series Waterloo Road (2010–2011).

== Career ==
Tina Michelle O'Brien was born on 7 August 1983 in Rusholme, Manchester, England. Her early acting roles included Children's Ward in 1997, The Cops in 1998 and Clocking Off in 2000. At the age of sixteen, she joined Coronation Street in October 1999, taking over the role of Sarah Platt from actress Lynsay King. Sarah's pregnancy with Bethany Platt won O'Brien Best Storyline at the British Soap Awards. She also won Best Newcomer at the National Television Awards and the TV Quick Awards.

Her first role after leaving Coronation Street was in the 2007 pantomime at Manchester Opera House, where she played the title character of Cinderella. Her first television role post-Coronation Street was in the ITV police television drama Blue Murder, filmed whilst four months pregnant, in which she played a character called Amy Kirkland. O'Brien expressed interest in doing televised dramas and theatre work, although after becoming pregnant, she decided to put her career on hold.

In 2010, O'Brien appeared in the sixth series of the BBC school drama Waterloo Road as Bex Fisher, the eldest daughter of the new headteacher Karen Fisher (Amanda Burton). In 2010, she also appeared in The Secret Diaries of Miss Anne Lister, in which she played the character of Miss Browne, a role which required her first on-screen lesbian kiss. Later in 2010, she appeared as a character in the new television drama Accused, written by Jimmy McGovern, as well as starring in the 2010 series of Strictly Come Dancing. Her partner was Jared Murillo, and she was unable to perform in the third week due to illness. O'Brien was eliminated in the fifth week of the competition after failing to impress the viewers with her Argentine Tango. She fell into the bottom two alongside Felicity Kendal, who was saved thanks to the public vote. From 4 December 2010 to 3 January 2011, O'Brien played the title character of Snow White in Manchester Opera House's 2010/2011 pantomime. Between 14 January and 13 February 2011, she participated in the 2011 Strictly Come Dancing Live Tour.

O'Brien co-founded the drama school Drama MOB in Manchester in 2013 with Esther Morgan. One of the school's students, Owen Cooper, found fame in 2025 in the Netflix drama Adolescence.

In October 2014, O'Brien announced that she would be reprising her role of Sarah Platt in Coronation Street in early 2015. The character returned on an episode broadcast on 30 March 2015.

== Personal life ==
O'Brien used to practise gymnastics until she was 10 years old. She gave it up in favour of acting as her family could not afford for her to do both.

O'Brien is the godmother of Emily Walton, who played the original Bethany Platt, her on-screen daughter.

O'Brien was in a relationship with Ryan Thomas from 2003 to 2009. They have one daughter, Scarlett, born 26 October 2008, who is now playing Izzy Charles in the 2023 reboot of Waterloo Road.

O'Brien married Adam Crofts on New Year's Eve 2018. They have one son. In March 2025, it was revealed that the couple had separated.

== Filmography ==
Television

Year	Title	Role	Notes
1997	Children's Ward	Claire	Regular role
1998	The Cops	Underage Girl	1 episode
1999–2008, 2015–present	Coronation Street	Sarah-Louise Platt	Regular role
2000	Clocking Off	Adele Kolakowski	Episode: "Yvonne's Story"
2002	Dick Whittington	Maid of Tonga	Television film
2004, 2007, 2015, 2022, 2023	This Morning	Herself	6 episodes
2004, 2007	Ant & Dec's Saturday Night Takeaway	Herself	2 episodes
2005	Coronation Street: Pantomime	Sarah-Louise Platt	Television special
2005	GMTV with Lorraine	Herself	1 episode
2009	Blue Murder	Amy Kirkland	Episode: "This Charming Man"
2009, 2010	Loose Women	Herself	3 episodes
2009	Xposé	Herself	1 episode
2010	The Secret Diaries of Miss Anne Lister	Miss Browne	TV mini-series
2010	The Alan Titchmarsh Show	Herself	1 episode
2010	BBC Breakfast	Herself	1 episode
2010–2011	Waterloo Road	Bex Fisher	Recurring role (season 6)
2010	Accused	Leanne Lang	Episode: "Helen's Story"
2010	Strictly Come Dancing	Herself	Contestant; participant
2011, 2014	Casualty	Chloe Trent/Olivia Tindal	4 episodes
2012	Call the Midwife	Cathy Powell	1 episode
2012	Crime Stories	Justine Peplow	1 episode
2012	The Corrie Years	Herself	3 episodes
2014	Doctors	Nikki Faulks	Episode: "About the Boy"
2014	Gail & Me: 40 Years on Coronation Street	Herself	Television special
2016	All Star Mr & Mrs	Herself	1 episode

Film

Year	Title	Role	Notes
2010	Blink	Bride	Short film

== Awards and nominations ==
Year	Award	Category	Result	Ref.
2000	6th National Television Awards	Most Popular Newcomer	Won	
2000	TV Quick Awards	Best Soap Newcomer	Won	
2005	The British Soap Awards	Sexiest Female	Nominated	
2005	Inside Soap Awards	Sexiest Female	Nominated	
2006	The British Soap Awards	Sexiest Female	Nominated	
2007	Inside Soap Awards	Sexiest Female	Nominated	
2007	Inside Soap Awards	Best Couple (shared with Ryan Thomas)	Nominated	
2008	Digital Spy Soap Awards	Most Popular Actress	Nominated	
2016	The British Soap Awards	Best Female Dramatic Performance	Nominated	
2016	Inside Soap Awards	Best Actress	Shortlisted	
2016	Digital Spy Reader Awards	Best Actress	Fourth	
2019	Inside Soap Awards	Best Actress	Nominated	
2022	The British Soap Awards	Best Leading Performer	Nominated	
