= List of Coronation Street characters introduced in 2003 =

The following is a list of characters that first appeared in the ITV soap opera Coronation Street in 2003, by order of first appearance.

== Tony Stewart ==
Tony Stewart
- Coronation Street character
- Portrayed by: Alan Igbon (2003); Terence Maynard (2014–2015)
- Duration: 2003, 2014–2015
- First appearance: 2 March 2003
- Last appearance: 18 November 2015
In-universe information
- Occupation: Electrician; Businessman; Pawnbroker; Barman; Pub Landlord
- Mother: Kitty Stewart
- Sons: Jason Grimshaw

Tony Stewart made his first screen appearance on 2 March 2003. The character was originally played by Alan Igbon, but Terence Maynard took over the role in 2014. Tony is Jason Grimshaw's (Ryan Thomas) father.

On 15 November 2013, it was announced that Tony would be returning to Coronation Street in 2014, with actor Terence Maynard taking over the role from Igbon. Jason's "roguish" father will attract the attention of Liz McDonald (Beverley Callard) when he arrives, but his intentions are soon questioned. David Brown from the Radio Times questioned how Eileen (Sue Cleaver) would react to Tony's sudden reappearance in her son's life, while series producer Stuart Blackburn commented, "His arrival is going to cause massive ructions for the Grimshaws. He is a man who can be your best friend or your worst enemy – and with a long history of lies and betrayal, this is a guy who has an awful lot of making up to do." Tony's reintroduction came as part of "an increased focus" on the Grimshaw family.

It was announced on 17 October 2015 that Maynard had filmed his final scenes and Tony departed on 18 November 2015. It was reported on 14 March 2016 that Tony would be killed off-screen, with Jason receiving the news in April 2016. A writer from ITVX put Tony on their list of Liz' top ten lovers, writing "Liz hooked up with her mate Eileen's ex in 2014, but a year later she learned of his affair with Tracy Barlow and their plan to steal the pub from her. Tony was unceremoniously dumped but he still holds a torch for Liz and now that he owns Steve's half of the pub he's got the perfect excuse to keep popping in for a pint and some flirty banter. But will Liz succumb to his charms?"

=== Storylines ===
Eileen and Jason are shocked when they bump into Jason's dad Tony Stewart and his girlfriend Merle Jackson in the Rovers. Tony bumps into Jason in the cafe. Jason is off-hand but Tony persuades him to sit down and talk to him. Jason agrees to meet him for a drink one evening. Jason meets his dad for a drink. They get on really well. Tony tells Jason that there may be a job for him at his building site.

Jason goes to Tony and Merle Jackson's house for dinner. Tony promises to try to get Jason a job on the building site where he works. Eileen is shocked and hurt when Tony bangs on the door and tells her that he's got Jason a job. Eileen realises that Jason has been meeting his dad behind her back. Tony and Jason chat in the Rovers about Jason's new job. Jason has a huge row with Eileen - he calls her a whore and she slaps him. He accuses Eileen of never giving Tony a chance. He makes her admit that Tony did once propose to her. Eileen tries to make Jason see what a lousy father Tony would have been. Jason gets his things and storms out. Eileen breaks down - she's worried that she's lost her son to Tony. To Tony and Merle's horror, Jason turns up saying that he's left his mum and has come to live with them. Eileen tracks Jason down to Merle's house. She and Tony have a huge row. Jason is disgusted with them and storms out. Jason arrives back at Tony's house only to find that he and Eileen are still rowing. Tony changes his mind and tells Jason he's very welcome to stay. Eileen pleads with him to come home but he chooses to stay with his dad. Merle demands that Tony must get rid of Jason as it's her house and she doesn't want him there. Tony can't bring himself to tell him. Eileen confides in Patrick how upset she is about Jason living with Tony. Jason starts his new job on the building site with his dad. Tony chats to him about his family. Jason is intrigued and wants to know more. Tony calls to see Eileen and asks her to try and persuade Jason to come home. Eileen agrees although she realises that she will be doing Tony's dirty work for him. Tony takes Jason to the Rovers where they bump into Eileen. Jason is gutted when Tony, under pressure from Merle, tells him that he'll have to move back to Eileen's house. Eileen can see that Jason is upset. She asks him if he wants his old bed back and he admits that he does. Tony tells Jason that he's found him some more work but it's in Warrington. Jason moans to Tony about the fact that Eileen has bought Todd a laptop and Todd is her favourite. Eileen is delighted when Jason turns down the offer of a drink with Tony in favour of going out in his new car. It is Jason's birthday. Eileen gives him a CD, Todd gives him the same CD and Tony gives him a sovereign ring. Jason and Tony agree to help Todd do his flat up. Tony and Jason rewire Todd's flat so that Todd's electricity now runs off the Bookies' supply downstairs. Todd is a little bit worried. Roy has a disastrous driving lesson and as he opens the car door to make his escape, he walks into the path of Jason's car. Jason is forced to swerve and crashes, leaving him with a fractured arm and Tony with a broken leg. Jason will be off work for six weeks, leaving Eileen to pay the car loan. Merle throws Tony out. She drops him and his belongings off at Eileen's house. She is not best pleased. Eileen is fed up with Tony living under the same roof. Jason explains to Tony how he lied to the insurance company and told them he was twenty-seven to get cheaper car insurance. Eileen is fed up with looking after Tony and Jason and worried about how she's going to pay the car loan now that Jason isn't earning. Eileen breaks down about her money worries to Tony. She's torn, but has no choice but to accept the £50 he offers her. Gail tells Peter about the dodgy wiring in the flat. Peter arranges for Tony Stewart to sort it out. Tony pretends that he's never been to the flat before. Against Sarah's better judgement Tony and Jason turn up at the flat to fix the wiring.

Tony gets £50 off Peter for fixing the faulty wiring in the flat. Peter then finds out that it was Tony's dodgy wiring in the first place and that Tony wired the flat so that the electricity ran off the bookies' supply. Peter is furious and demands his money back from Tony and Jason. Eileen is at her wits' end. She's no money and she's sick of supporting Tony. Eileen tells Tony to clear out. Tony gives a tearful Jason his forwarding address and leaves. Tony calls into see Eileen before he leaves and whilst Eileen's back is turned he steals the £700 takings from Street Cars. Eileen is horrified to find the money has been stolen. She realises that Tony must have taken it. Eileen explains how Tony has stolen £700. She asks Jason to find him. Jason is confused and upset. Jason realises that Tony must have stolen the £700. Jason and Todd pay Tony a visit. He admits that he stole the money and gives it to Jason. Jason is upset that his dad is a loser and a thief. He tells him he doesn't want to see him any more. Jason doesn't see his father for another ten years.

In 2014, Eileen is shocked to receive a visit from Tony. Jason is surprised to find Tony at home when he returns from the Rovers. None of the Grimshaws are pleased to see Tony's return, the boys pointing out what a lousy father he has been. Eileen suggests that Jason take him to the Rovers to get him out of the house. Tony suggests that he and Jason do building work together but his son is in no way convinced. Tony tells the Grimshaws that he's trying to make up for lost time but Eileen and Todd aren't convinced. Jason isn't entirely hostile to his father, though. Eileen is quietly hoping that Tony won't hang around for long. Liz enjoys it when Tony flirts with her. Tony buys drinks for Jason, Eva and Todd and asks Jason if they can be mates. Forgetting about Todd's dinner, Jason agrees to meet Tony for dinner at the bistro on Monday. Todd tells him he doesn't mind as it will make the evening more exciting. It is Todd's birthday but he is not looking forward to the prospect of his birthday meal at the bistro with Tony present. Jason assures a worried Eileen that his dad will be thrown out if he causes trouble but she confesses that her main worry is that Tony will hurt him. Tony turns up at the party with an expensive bottle for Todd. Tony assures Eileen that he's changed his ways and realises that he's been a rotten father. Jason is upset when Tony makes a comment about Eileen and tells him he's not welcome to join Todd's party in town. Eileen finds Tony confiding in Liz in the Rovers and makes it clear she isn't pleased.

Tony and Liz then begin a relationship, but soon in December 2014, he begins an affair with Tracy Barlow (Kate Ford). In the summer of 2015, Liz becomes aware of Tony and Tracy's affair and tells him not to come back to the Rovers. He returns months later and in November 2015, attempts to reconcile with Liz. He and Liz then get back together and Tony signs his papers of the Rovers back over to Liz. Tony is then about to propose to her but she rejects him and says that she will never forgive him for cheating on her and that she had tricked him. With his reputation and life in tatters, Tony makes the decision to leave Weatherfield. He says a final goodbye to his son, and Eileen, before departing. Unfortunately, this would be the last time Jason would ever see his father...

In April 2016, Eileen is visited by police who inform her that Tony has been found dead in his flat of a suspected heart attack. Jason is shocked and refuses to believe his dad is dead until he sees his body at the morgue. Jason is distraught and begins to lash out at everyone, especially Liz who he blames for his dad leaving, and he begins pushing everyone away, before reconciling with most people after Tony's funeral. It's then revealed that he's left upwards of eighty grand to Jason. In June 2016, Tony is placed in the frame for the murder of Callum Logan (Sean Ward), whose rotting corpse was found underneath the Platt family's annexe in a car crash the prior month, pushing the blame further away from Callum's true killer; Kylie Platt (Paula Lane). The accusation is made more believable as Tony and Jason had been the ones constructing the annexe to begin with, and they had a motive due to Callum's mates attacking Jason just a few months before his apparent death. Jason can't believe this accusation, and briefly launches a campaign against the Platts to clear his dad's name, before a wrench with both Callum and Tony's DNA on it seemingly confirms the accusation that Tony did indeed murder Callum, whose mates begin a revenge campaign against Jason. He initially ignores a warning from Gemma Winter (Dolly-Rose Campbell), who used to know Callum, before his van is torched. Jason then decides to flee Weatherfield, leaving his business and money in the hands of Eileen, and her shifty new lover, Pat Phelan. Tony's name is yet to be cleared for Callum's murder.

== Bev Unwin ==
Bev Unwin
- Coronation Street character
- Portrayed by: Susie Blake
- Duration: 2003–2006, 2015
- First appearance: 24 March 2003
- Last appearance: 15 July 2015
- Introduced by: Kieran Roberts (2003); Stuart Blackburn (2015)
In-universe information
- Occupation: Former pub landlady Barmaid
- Brothers: Lenny Baker
- Husband: Charlie Unwin (1978–2002)
- Daughters: Shelley Unwin; Sharon Unwin
- Granddaughters: Baby Unwin

Bev Unwin (also Baker) is played by Susie Blake. Prior to her arrival on the Street, Bev had owned a pub with her husband until he died. Bev has two daughters Shelley (Sally Lindsay) and Sharon Unwin, who dies in March 2003.

After Sharon's death, Bev moves into The Rovers Return Inn, where she works as barmaid alongside her daughter Shelley who is pub manager. While there she has a fling with much younger barman Ciaran McCarthy (Keith Duffy) and later briefly dates Charlie Stubbs (Bill Ward) before he begins a relationship with Shelley. Bev also spends some time working at The Weatherfield Arms. She gets engaged to Fred Elliott (John Savident), and is due to marry him in early October 2006 but he dies on their ill-fated wedding day before the ceremony whilst visiting Audrey Roberts (Sue Nicholls).

Bev never gets over losing Fred before they married, and after controversially dividing his ashes into two halves, presenting Fred's son Ashley Peacock (Steven Arnold) with his share in an instant-gravy jar, she begins to hit the bottle, quite often helping herself to drinks at the bar of the Rovers. When the McDonalds buy the pub from Ashley, who had inherited it from Fred, she moves in with Claire (Julia Haworth) and Ashley, but relationships are strained between them. Bev finally agrees to move away from Weatherfield and joins daughter Shelley at her pub in the Peak District. She moves during Christmas 2006, having scattered Fred's ashes with Ashley.

In May 2011, Deirdre Barlow (Anne Kirkbride) went to visit Bev, when her absence is explained to Steve. Deirdre also went to visit Bev in September 2012. In October 2014, Deirdre leaves Weatherfield to stay with Bev for a break from all the stress on the street and extended her stay to look after Bev as her brother Lenny had suddenly died.

Blake reprised the role for the funeral of Deirdre following the real life death of her friend and former colleague Anne Kirkbride. Bev turns up at the Barlow household in July 2015 and informs Ken (William Roache) and Tracy Barlow (Kate Ford) that Deirdre has died earlier that day. Bev stays to attend Deirdre's funeral and the wake where she has a confrontation with Audrey regarding events that happened years ago with Fred. Bev and Audrey later put their differences aside and Bev leaves Weatherfield early the following morning.

== Claire Peacock ==
Claire Jane Peacock (also Casey) is a fictional character in the UK television ITV soap opera Coronation Street. Portrayed by actress Julia Haworth, the character first appeared onscreen during the episode airing on 9 April 2003, as the new nanny of established character Ashley Peacock's (Steven Arnold) son Joshua (Benjamin Beresford). Her storylines have since seen her fall in love with and marry Ashley, developing post natal depression after giving birth to their son Freddie. Claire was originally intended to be central to a long-running child abduction storyline, however, this was dropped by the show's producers as a result of its close resemblance to the disappearance of Madeleine McCann.

== Andy Morgan ==
Andy Morgan
- Coronation Street character
- Portrayed by: Steve Huison
- First appearance: 13 April 2003
- Last appearance: 16 April 2003
In-universe information
- Brothers: Nick Morgan; Tom Morgan

Andy Morgan was one of the brothers of Tom Morgan, a criminal who shot and killed a man in a Sheffield pub where Angela Harris (Kathryn Hunt) worked. She knew both the victim and the reputation of the Morgan family but gave evidence in court that helped to convict Tom. The Harrises then suffered a campaign of harassment and intimidation from the Morgan family and, in particular Andy and his third brother Nick which culminated in their home being set on fire one night and all their possessions burnt. The police put the Harris family on a witness protection programme and moved them to Weatherfield where, living at 6 Coronation Street, they assumed the surname of "Nelson".

Angela's daughter Katy Harris (Lucy-Jo Hudson) found cutting off all ties with their previous life difficult and after a few months made contact with two former friends from Sheffield, Louise Crawley and Paul Evanson, with whom she went to an indie gig in Manchester. Although she enjoyed the night out, Katy was unaware that Andy had followed Louise and Paul from across the Pennines and, in turn, he then followed Katy home to Coronation Street. He rang his other brother Nick to say that he'd traced the family to where they were living and the two men made plans to exact their revenge on the Harrises. Carrying hand weapons and unsure of exactly which house their targets occupied they called at No. 13 and were told by Sally Webster (Sally Dynevor) where they could find Tommy (Thomas Craig) and Angela who they claimed were their "old friends". Only Katy was at home when the Morgans forced their way in, telling her they would wait for the others to return and that a pub full of people in Sheffield was ready to give them an alibi at the time they would be murdering the Harris family. Katy had recently been diagnosed as being diabetic but the brothers prevented her from taking his insulin shot, realising that if Katy's death appeared to be of natural causes then it could not be blamed on them.

The family was saved when Sally told her husband Kevin about two strange men who had called at their house. He was one of the few residents who knew the "Nelson" family's secret, having threatened to sack Tommy from his garage when he saw that he had a wallet in the name of Harris and assumed he had stolen it. When Sally confirmed that the two men had a Yorkshire accent, Kevin went to check on the house and, unknowingly, came close to being shot by the panicking Morgan brothers within. Kevin returned home and called the police. Tommy, Angela and Craig (Richard Fleeshman) returned home to find police officers outside and they called for back-up when the situation was explained in full to the Harrises. At that moment, Katy screamed for help and Tommy ran through the police and into the house where a shot rang out. Tommy had been shot in the arm and the Morgan brothers ran out of the back door where Nick was apprehended and disarmed. Andy got away but was tracked down and arrested a few days later.

This was actor Steve Huison's second role on the show. He returned five years later after being cast as series regular Eddie Windass in November 2008.

== Stuart Fergus ==
Stuart Fergus
- Coronation Street character
- Portrayed by: Scott Taylor
- Duration: 2003, 2021
- First appearance: 26 May 2003
- Last appearance: 30 April 2021
- Introduced by: Kieran Roberts (2003); Iain MacLeod (2021)

Stuart Fergus, played by Scott Taylor, is an ex school-friend of Todd Grimshaw (Bruno Langley). Todd meets up with Stuart along with his girlfriend Sarah Platt (Tina O'Brien), who Stuart remembers as the girl who got pregnant at 13. Todd was planning to go to Oxford University if he got the grades and Stuart regaled him with student nightlife stories and explained to Todd that he would enjoy it. Stuart meets Todd and Sarah at The Rovers where they told him their plans for Sarah to later join Todd at weekends, not realising that Todd's mother Eileen Grimshaw (Sue Cleaver) was listening in ear-shot.

In 2021, it was announced that Taylor had reprised his role as Stuart. He appears in George Shuttleworth's (Tony Maudsley) funeral parlour, where Todd works. Todd is working his notice period after George fired him for taking advantage of vulnerable and grieving customers. Stuart reveals that the young boy in the chapel of rest is his son. This brings back the memories for Todd of when he and his ex-girlfriend, Sarah Platt (Tina O'Brien) lost their newborn son, Billy Platt. Once George finds this out, he offers Todd his sympathy and then offers him his job back and the two go for a drink, not just as co-workers, but as friends.

== Sonia Marshall ==
Sonia Marshall
- Coronation Street character
- Portrayed by: Tina Gambe
- Duration: 2003–2005
- First appearance: 16 June 2003
- Last appearance: 18 April 2005
In-universe information
- Occupation: Factory Machinist

Sonia Marshall was played by Tina Gambe. Sonia worked at Mike Baldwin's (Johnny Briggs) factory for two years from 16 June 2003 to 18 April 2005. She eventually decided to become a Red Coat at a holiday camp and left the street for good.

== Simon Barlow ==
Simon John Barlow was born in July 2003 to Lucy Richards (Katy Carmichael), who had already split up with Simon's father Peter Barlow (Chris Gascoyne). On learning that he had married his girlfriend, Shelley, when they had married first - she told Shelley that her marriage was illegal. In revenge, Lucy tricked Peter into thinking they had a future together, then, in front of pub regulars, announced she and Simon were emigrating to Australia. Peter resigned himself to the fact that he would never know his son, and left the Street soon after. Peter was given custody of Simon when Lucy died from ovarian cancer in 2008 and they moved in with Peter's father, Ken (William Roache), his stepmother Deirdre (Anne Kirkbride) and Deirdre's mother Blanche Hunt (Maggie Jones). Peter, at first reluctant to take an active role in raising his son, changed his mind when he found out that Lucy had left her estate to him, on the condition that he raised Simon. Peter then bought the local bookmaker's shop and moved in there, with Simon. Unfortunately Peter has a drinking problem, which began evident when Peter came to Simon's Nativity play, drunk and had a row with teaching staff. Simon stayed with his grandparents until Peter agreed to stop drinking but in March 2009, however, Peter passed out with a lit cigarette in his hand, and the flat caught fire. Luke Strong (Craig Kelly) and Tony Gordon (Gray O'Brien) broke the door down, after Deirdre alerted them as Simon had telephoned her before he passed out due to smoke inhalation. Peter and Simon were rushed to hospital and made a full recovery. Peter vowed once more to give up alcohol.

== Sean Tully ==
Sean Tully is a fictional character in the UK television ITV soap opera Coronation Street. Portrayed by actor Antony Cotton, the character first appeared on 13 July 2003 for one episode, before returning full-time on 12 April 2004. Sean is introduced as a gay colleague of Martin Platt (Sean Wilson) and Karl Foster (Chris Finch). Some months after his first appearance Sean comes to Coronation Street, desperately looking for somewhere to live. Karl's ex-boyfriend Todd Grimshaw (Bruno Langley) recognises Sean and takes him for a drink at The Rovers. When Todd's mother Eileen Grimshaw (Sue Cleaver) meets Sean, she likes him and offers him a place to stay. Her other son, Jason Grimshaw (Ryan Thomas), is not pleased but later warms to the idea. Sean gets a job at Underworld, where he makes friends with Fiz Brown (Jennie McAlpine) and Kelly Crabtree (Tupele Dorgu).

== Penny King ==
Penny King
- Coronation Street character
- Portrayed by: Pauline Fleming
- Duration: 2003–2006
- First appearance: 8 August 2003
- Last appearance: 17 April 2006
In-universe information
- Occupation: Businesswoman
- Husband: Preston King

Penny King is played by Pauline Fleming. She made her first screen appearance during the episode broadcast on 8 August 2003. She is married to local businessman Preston King, who often does business with Mike Baldwin (Johnny Briggs). When Preston dies, Penny becomes friends with Fred Elliott (John Savident), publican of The Rovers Return Inn, who takes a shine to her and proposes marriage; however, she turns him down. Penny and Mike become close, and a relationship ensues, creating tension between Mike and Fred. She and Mike later become engaged. Mike's Alzheimer's disease creeps in and he kicks her out of his flat, confusing her with his ex-wife Linda (Jacqueline Pirie), who had an affair with his son Mark.

Penny's final appearance is at Mike's funeral. Mike's grandson, Jamie Baldwin (Rupert Hill), works for her clothing company, King's Robes, up until late December 2006.

Penny, or her business successors, appears to be one of the sponsors of Weatherfield County FC, whose home ground as of the 2019/2020 season is named the King's Robes Arena.

== Maya Sharma ==
Maya Sharma is a fictional character that appeared on the UK TV soap opera Coronation Street. She was played by Sasha Behar. She appears between 2003 and 2004. Maya was perhaps best known for her disastrous relationship with Dev Alahan (Jimmi Harkishin) and her dangerous feud with Dev's wife Sunita Alahan (Shobna Gulati). She held the pair hostage in her flat, and set the building on fire. As she made her escape, Maya was involved in a car accident.

== Brenda Fearns ==
Brenda Fearns
- Coronation Street character
- Portrayed by: Julia Deakin
- Duration: 2003–2004
- First appearance: 19 September 2003
- Last appearance: 7 January 2004
In-universe information
- Husband: Mr. Fearns (1984–2001)
- Sons: Neil Fearns
- Granddaughters: Bethany Platt

Brenda Fearns is the mother of the late Neil Fearns (Paul Holowaty), father of Bethany Platt (Amy and Emily Walton).

In September 2003, when Neil had died in a car crash, Sarah took Bethany to his funeral so she can give her information about her father once she is older. They meet Brenda, and at the wake, Brenda apologized to Sarah for her pregnancy three years prior. Brenda's good friend, Norma, told Sarah about Brenda's tragic past and how her husband left her for a "younger model." Brenda felt that Bethany and Sarah coming to Neil's funeral was like a sign of God so she won't be alone. She asked Sarah if she could visit Bethany sometimes and Sarah, feeling bad for her, agreed.

During her visits, Brenda started doing odd jobs and buying things for Sarah and Todd Grimshaw (Bruno Langley). Sarah was grateful but Todd was uncomfortable. In November 2003, when Sarah and Todd were having problems paying their bills, Brenda invited them to live with her but wouldn't allow them to share a room as they're not a married couple. Sarah and Todd decided to stay in their flat to avoid being separated. In December, concerns started to rise when Sarah allowed Bethany to stay with Brenda overnight but was late bringing her home, upsetting Sarah and making her and Todd call the police. When Brenda finally returned, Sarah shouted at her and told her to stay away from her daughter. Brenda returned later to return Bethany's favourite baby doll and lambasted Todd for being a father figure while Neil disapprovingly looked down at the sight of his little girl with another man, like her father. This angered Sarah and Brenda told her that she shouldn't "go dumping her kid" so she can just have a boyfriend, making her and Todd angrily throw Brenda out. However, Sarah later let Brenda back in after she started crying at the thought of her first Christmas without Neil.

When Sarah discovered she was expecting Todd's baby, Brenda overheard them talking about it and told Bethany she would make sure she wasn't forgotten about. She even told Sarah to get married so the baby could be brought up in wedlock. In January 2004, Brenda bumped into Gail Platt (Helen Worth), and told Gail that she didn't deserve to have children because she had called social services about Sarah and Todd. Whilst at the cemetery, she shouted at Ashley Peacock (Steven Arnold) to stay away from her "daughter" when he went to talk to her. He told Sarah about the incident, causing Sarah and Todd to stop Brenda seeing Bethany. Brenda tried to wheedle her way back into Bethany's life by persuading Sarah to let her drop Bethany off at nursery, but Sarah still refused to let Brenda see her granddaughter. Brenda's grief over losing her son and granddaughter made her mentally unstable and she kidnapped Bethany from nursery, thinking the only way to solve her problems was to join Neil in Heaven, so she decided to commit suicide by throwing herself and Bethany from the tower of St. Savior's Church. However, Emily Bishop (Eileen Derbyshire) spotted them and stopped Brenda before harm was done. Bethany was safely reunited with Sarah and Todd while Brenda was led away by ambulances while she prayed to God for forgiveness.

== Cilla Battersby-Brown ==
Cilla Petunia Aurelia Battersby-Brown (also Brown) is a fictional character from the British soap opera Coronation Street, played by Wendi Peters. She made her first screen appearance during the episode broadcast on 20 October 2003. After three years in the role, Peters announced her departure from the show in November 2006. Cilla made her screen exit on 12 October 2007. Peters later reprised the role for the DVD spin-off, Coronation Street: Out of Africa, in November 2008. On 26 June 2014, it was announced that Cilla would be returning for a short stint. She returned for three and a half weeks from 22 October to 14 November 2014. Cilla was introduced as a love interest for established character Les Battersby (Bruce Jones). Cilla was also the mother of Chesney (Sam Aston), Fiz (Jennie McAlpine) and Billy Brown (Jay Martin). During her time in the show, Cilla pulled several scams and was disliked by most of her neighbours. She was diagnosed with skin cancer and later used her condition to get revenge on Les after he had an affair. Cilla left Weatherfield for Las Vegas in 2007, leaving her young son Chesney behind.

== Charlie Stubbs ==
Charles "Charlie" Stubbs is a fictional character in the British soap opera Coronation Street, played by Bill Ward. He made his first appearance during the episode broadcast on 10 November 2003 and last appearance on 15 January 2007. He first appears with another builder in 2003, needing a parking space for his bulldozer, but Mike Baldwin (Johnny Briggs) refuses to move his car so Charlie moves Mike's Jaguar with the bulldozer in response. Mike only just manages to stop his car being smashed. Charlie initially seems to be a nice person, although a bit of a ladies' man. He flirts with Deirdre Barlow (Anne Kirkbride) on learning that she works for the council, hoping she'll recommend him for building contracts and has a casual relationship with Bev Unwin (Susie Blake). Unfortunately Bev takes the relationship more seriously and doesn't react well when he ends it and starts dating her daughter, Shelley Unwin (Sally Lindsay), causing trouble between Bev and Shelley. Struggling to cope, Bev leaves and Charlie's relationship with Shelley is happy for a while but slowly his true nature emerges. Although he rarely hurts her physically, Charlie isolates Shelley from her family and friends and as part of a campaign of psychological abuse, Charlie tells Shelley that he heard Sunita Alahan (Shobna Gulati), her best friend, insult her behind her back. One day, he walks into the Rovers back room just as Shelley is leaving, accidentally giving her a black eye. Knowing what people will think, Charlie asks Shelley to stay out of sight until it heals. She agrees and stays in her bedroom. Charlie, wanting her to be comfortable, moves the sofa and television up from the back room but makes her agoraphobic. Initially thrilled that Shelley is solely dependent on him, he soon gets bored. Feeling bad about herself, she refuses to sleep with Charlie so he starts cheating on her by first kissing barmaid Violet Wilson (Jenny Platt), and brings another woman back to The Rovers Return Inn, sleeping with her in the back room and on his stag night.

== Chesney Brown ==
Chesney Eric Brown (also Battersby-Brown) is a fictional character in the ITV soap opera Coronation Street, played by Sam Aston. He made his first on screen appearance during the episode airing on 10 November 2003. The character is named after singer, Chesney Hawkes. Chesney is brother to Fiz Brown (Jennie McAlpine) and son to Cilla Battersby-Brown (Wendi Peters). Chesney' storylines have included his friendship with pet dog Schmeichel and coming to terms with his death, as well as his relationship with Katy Armstrong (Georgia May Foote) who later went on to give birth to his son Joseph. Chesney recently embarked on a relationship with Sinead Tinker (Katie McGlynn).

== Philip Newton ==
Philip Newton
- Coronation Street character
- Portrayed by: Malcolm Scates (2003); Bruce McGregor (2023)
- Duration: 2003, 2023
- First appearance: Episode 5630; 21 November 2003
- Last appearance: Episode 11035/6; 18 August 2023
- Introduced by: Kieran Roberts (2003); Iain McLeod (2023)
In-universe information
- Occupation: Brewery boss
- Father: Cecil Newton
- Sons: Henry Newton
- Daughters: Helen Newton
- Grandfathers: George Newton
- Uncles: George Newton Jr.
- Aunts: Anne Newton; Margaret Newton

Philip Newton is the son of Cecil Newton (Kenneth Alan Taylor/George Baker) and the father of Henry (George Banks) and Helen Newton (Lily Knight). He first appears in late 2003 at a licensee's reunion along with his father, who is attracted to Bet Lynch (Julie Goodyear). Philip sees Bet as a gold-digger and tells Bet that Cecil suffered heart problems and is displaying senility. Bet tries to tell Philip that she only wants to be Cecil's friend but he refuses to listen. Bet talks to Cecil, who admits his relationship with Philip is strained and Philip is only interested in his inheritance. After Cecil proposes, Philip is furious and hires a private investigator to follow Bet's every move in order to gain incriminating evidence.

Bet is caught kissing an escaped Jim McDonald (Charles Lawson) and a photo is taken. Philip gleefully shows the photographs to a shaken Cecil who, in turn, confronted Bet with the "evidence". However, she, Liz McDonald (Beverly Callard) and Fred Elliott (John Savident) are able to confirm who the man in the pictures and explain that Bet and Jim were posing as a couple to avoid Jim being apprehended and the wedding is back on again. The wedding is planned in secret but when Philip takes a call from the parish priest, Arthur Fallow who confirms the arrangements, he races to the church and confronts Cecil and Bet but mid-argument Cecil has a heart attack and later dies in hospital. Philip inherits his father's fortune and is not seen again for nearly twenty years.

Philip returns in the summer of 2023 and looks into buying the Rovers Return Inn but refuses due to the pub being unprofitable. He flirts with Glenda Shuttleworth (Jodie Prenger), making her uncomfortable. He also disapproves of Henry hiring Gemma Winter-Brown (Dolly-Rose Campbell) as his personal assistant.

== Karl Foster ==
Karl Foster
- Coronation Street character
- Portrayed by: Chris Finch
- Duration: 2003–2004
- First appearance: 24 December 2003
- Last appearance: 30 August 2004
- Introduced by: Kieran Roberts
In-universe information
- Occupation: Nurse

Karl Foster was an overly confident nurse, who was the best friend of Katy Harris (Lucy-Jo Hudson). Karl was also good friends with Sean Tully (Antony Cotton). He was the third openly gay male character to appear in the soap. He appears as fun-loving and arrogant, but with a soft side for friends.

In 2004, he embarked on a relationship with Todd Grimshaw (Bruno Langley) after the two had first struck up a friendship at the hospital where they both worked, and Todd had confided in him about his attempt to kiss Nick (Adam Rickitt), the brother of his girlfriend Sarah-Louise Platt (Tina O'Brien). Todd and Karl gradually grew closer, and their clandestine affair began after they kissed on a night out at a gay bar on Canal Street in Manchester's gay village.

The affair remains a secret until Todd reveals to Sarah that he is gay, admitting that he and Karl had been seeing each other. Despite Todd telling Sarah and his mother Eileen (Sue Cleaver) that he had fallen in love with Karl, their romance did not continue.

Following the revelation, Sarah and Todd's baby Billy was born prematurely following a placental abruption, and he died. While Sarah was recovering in hospital, Karl visited her and left flowers while she slept. Martin (Sean Wilson), Sarah's adoptive father, walked in on his visit, and blamed Karl and Todd for causing Billy's death.

Despite Karl's reminder that Billy's death was due to a medical complication that was not caused by stress, Martin physically attacked Karl in the hospital corridor; in a later story, CCTV footage of this attack was replayed to Martin when he was in the frame for murdering neighbour Tommy Harris (Thomas Craig) the following year.

Almost two months after Billy's funeral, Karl briefly returned to Coronation Street, visiting the Grimshaw home to catch up with Todd, having not seen him since Billy's death. During a long heart-to-heart, Todd happily tells Karl how much progress he has made in accepting his sexuality. Todd admits he still had feelings for Karl, but the two agree that it is best to remain friends.

They go for one last drink at the Rovers Return Inn, where they are insulted by Les Battersby (Bruce Jones). However, Todd stands up to him, and Les is shamed out of the pub. After this, Todd and Karl hugged and parted ways. Karl had a heated exchange with Martin, in which Karl threatened to fight back next time. This marked his final appearance onscreen to date.

Karl's popularity sparked a petition on an internet forum, The Different Side, which gained many signatures urging his return. The show's producers agreed to keep the door open for Finch and Karl to return.

== Others ==
Character	Date(s)	Actor	Circumstances
Sergeant Draper	31 March; 19 December; 15 September – 31 October 2008; 26 January 2009; 15 March 2010; 10 January 2011	Peter Foster	A police sergeant at the local station.
Sarah Crocker	9 July	Naomi Thompson	The drama teacher at Weatherfield High when Sally Webster (Sally Dynevor) went to Weatherfield High for a meeting about her elder daughter Rosie (Helen Flanagan). Sally was angry that Rosie had not been given a role in the school production of My Fair Lady.
Reverend Graham Broadbent	11–20 July; 25 December 2004; 17 April 2006; 9–20 October 2006; 12–14 January 2009; 14 February 2011	Gerry Hinks	Local Weatherfield vicar. He first conducts the wedding of Peter Barlow to Shelley Unwin, and returns to marry Ashley Peacock to Claire Casey in 2004. In 2006, he conducts the funeral of Mike Baldwin in April, and appeared again at Fred Elliott's wedding to Bev Unwin, before overseeing Fred's funeral later in October. The reverend returns to marry Tyrone Dobbs and Molly Compton in 2009, and last appears to conduct Peter Barlow's marriage blessing to Leanne Barlow in 2011.
Gerry Burton	5 September	Mark Chatterton	Marion Stowe's boyfriend, who started to sexually harass her daughter, Candice Stowe (Nikki Sanderson), but whenever Candice told her mother what was going on, Marion didn't believe her. This resulted in Candice to stay at the flat above Audrey's Salon. Gerry turned up at the salon the next day and told Candice he and her mother were worried about her but what he was really doing was frightening the girl. When salon owner Audrey Roberts (Sue Nicholls) came in, looking for her purse, she discovered what Gerry was like and threatened that if he were to come near Candice again, she would call the police. Gerry reluctantly left the salon. When Marion found out, she kicked Candice out. Candice and her mother never made up over the incident.
Registrar	17 November; 8 April 2005; 14 August 2006; 31 December 2007; 28 September – 1 October 2009; 8 April 2011	Blue Merrick	Registrar who officiates several marriages, beginning with Roy Cropper and Tracy Barlow in 2003. She returns to oversee the remarriage of Ken Barlow to Deirdre Rachid in 2005, and again in 2006 for the failed wedding of Jason Grimshaw to Sarah-Louise Platt, which ended when the groom fled through the window of the toilets. In December 2007, she marries Liz McDonald and Vernon Tomlin, and returns in 2009 for the prison wedding of Fiz Brown to John Stape. The registrar makes her last appearance to date in April 2011 at the double wedding of David Platt and Kylie Turner, and Graeme Proctor and Xin Chiang.
