= List of Coronation Street characters introduced in 2005 =

The following is a list of characters that first appeared in the ITV soap opera Coronation Street in 2005, by order of first appearance.

== Scooter Makuna ==
Scooter Makuna
- Coronation Street character
- Portrayed by: Sushil Chudasama
- First appearance: 26 January 2005
- Last appearance: 6 November 2005
In-universe information
- Occupation: Unemployed

Hiren "Scooter" Makuna first appeared in early 2005 as the boyfriend of Sarah Platt (Tina O'Brien). He was of Indian descent. His character was mostly remembered for not being very bright, having a fondness for fish and getting great pleasure in retrieving junk from skips. Sarah broke up with him in the autumn of 2005 after she had a fling with Jason Grimshaw (Ryan Thomas) and an argument. He left the Street soon afterwards.

== Lena Thistlewood ==
Lena Thistlewood
- Coronation Street character
- Portrayed by: Maria Charles
- First appearance: 26 January 2005
- Last appearance: 29 June 2005
In-universe information
- Occupation: Retired

Lena Thistlewood is a friend of Blanche Hunt (Maggie Jones), who first appears in 2005 and regularly visits the Barlow household and she takes a fancy to Ken Barlow (William Roache). She subsequently attends Ken's second wedding to Blanche's daughter, Deirdre Rachid (Anne Kirkbride) in 2005.

After the wedding, Lena booked her car in for an MOT at Webster's Autocentre and hoped to get a certificate without a test; however, mechanic Tyrone Dobbs (Alan Halsall) said it would need one owing to its age. When Lena next visited the garage, she caught Tyrone having sex with Maria Sutherland (Samia Longchambon). As a result, she pretended to be overcome with shock and manipulated Tyrone into giving her a free MOT and Maria into giving her a free haircut. Lena dies off-screen on New Year's Day 2006 and she leaves her dog, Lady Freckles, to Blanche, who renames her Eccles.

== Diggory Compton ==
Diggory Compton
- Coronation Street character
- Portrayed by: Eric Potts
- Duration: 2005–2006
- First appearance: 2 February 2005
- Last appearance: 17 July 2006
- Created by: Sue Pritchard
In-universe information
- Occupation: Baker
- Sisters: Pam Hobsworth
- Daughters: Molly Dobbs
- Grandsons: Jack Webster

Diggory Compton was played by Eric Potts. When he arrives in Weatherfield with his daughter Molly (Vicky Binns), Diggory opens the local bakery shop at the end of the street. He tries wooing Liz McDonald (Beverley Callard) by inviting her to a Christmas dinner party; however, she ended up meeting her future husband, drummer Vernon Tomlin (Ian Reddington), at the event. During his time in Weatherfield, Diggory befriends Mike Baldwin (Johnny Briggs). Diggory leaves Weatherfield in July 2006 after his business fails.

Molly visits him in 2008 after falling out with her fiancé Tyrone Dobbs (Alan Halsall). On 5 January 2009, Molly receives a call from the hospital that Diggory's appendix has burst. Several days later, it is revealed Diggory will recover but he will ultimately miss Molly and Tyrone's wedding due to being hospitalised for a week. In December 2010, Diggory is informed by telephone that Molly has died in the tram crash caused by an explosion at the Joinery Bar. Diggory's sister Pam Hobsworth (Kate Anthony) tells Molly's former lover Kevin Webster (Michael Le Vell) the heartbreak of having to inform Diggory of his daughter's death saying she is wondering what words to use to break the news to him. Diggory is not seen at Molly's funeral as he is reportedly too ill to attend.

== Jessie Jackson ==
Jessie Jackson
- Coronation Street character
- Portrayed by: Nailah Cumberbatch
- Duration: 2005–2006
- First appearance: 28 February 2005
- Last appearance: 27 January 2006
In-universe information
- Occupation: Stewardess
- First cousins: Joanne Jackson

Jessie Jackson is played by actress Nailah Cumberbatch. She arrives at Underworld with her "twin sister" Joanne (Zaraah Abrahams) to replace departing machinist Sonia Marshall (Tina Gambe) and is the more outgoing one of the two. In 2006, Danny Baldwin (Bradley Walsh) sacks Jessie after he catches her dancing on the tables, and she subsequently seeks employment as a stewardess and leaves the Street. Her "twin sister" is later revealed to be her cousin.

== Joanne Jackson ==
Joanne Jackson was played by the actress Zaraah Abrahams. The character and casting was announced in February 2005 and she debuted later that month. Joanne arrived at Underworld with her "twin sister" Jessie and proceeded to cause much amusement by claiming to be identical despite the obvious difference in appearance. Joanne was the shyer of the two and lacks confidence where men are concerned. Abrahams later left the role in 2007 and the character last appeared on 20 July 2007.

== Keith Appleyard ==
Keith Appleyard
- Coronation Street character
- Portrayed by: Ian Redford
- Duration: 2005–2006
- First appearance: 23 March 2005
- Last appearance: 30 July 2006
In-universe information
- Occupation: Paper boy/Taxidermist
- Sisters: Margery Appleyard
- Wife: Shirley Appleyard (1978–2004)
- Daughters: Angela Harris; Lorraine Appleyard; Pauline Appleyard
- Grandsons: Craig Harris
- Granddaughters: Katy Harris

Keith Appleyard is played by Ian Redford. Keith is Angela Harris's (Kathryn Hunt) father. When she and her family live in Sheffield, she witnesses a murder. Keith persuades Angela to tell the truth and testify at the trial, which results in their move to Weatherfield under the witness protection scheme. They are also given a new name - Nelson - but don't use it for long. Keith first appears in 2005 to help Angela after her husband Tommy (Thomas Craig) dies. He stays to look after his grandchildren Katy (Lucy-Jo Hudson) and Craig (Richard Fleeshman) after Angela is arrested for Tommy's murder. Katy (the real killer) commits suicide, unable to handle the guilt, and Angela is imprisoned for helping Katy cover up the crime. Keith stays with Craig in Coronation Street, rather than insist Craig join him in Sheffield, feeling Craig has suffered enough - plus, Weatherfield is closer than Sheffield to where Angela is in prison.

After moving in, Keith dates hairdresser Audrey Roberts (Sue Nicholls), who is his opposite in many ways. Keith is always watching the pennies and takes on a paper round to earn some extra money. His hobbies include taxidermy. Keith is widowed, his wife having died between 2003 and 2005. Angela telephones her mother on Christmas Day 2002, and visits her in September 2003, but she has died by the time Keith arrives in 2005. After he and Audrey end things as they are so different, Keith became enemies with builder Charlie Stubbs (Bill Ward). Charlie bills Keith for repairing the leak on the roof but Keith refuses to pay the bill, feeling Charlie has overcharged. In revenge, Charlie removes the roof tiles, insisting he will replace them when Keith pays his bill. Keith rings the police but the police say they can't help as it isn't a police matter. Keith is delighted to see Charlie replacing the tiles, thinking that he has won, until Charlie reveals that he is his new landlord.

Keith is horrified and says that the landlord would have told him but Charlie says that he asked the former landlord to let him do that. Charlie's girlfriend, Tracy Barlow (Kate Ford), is delighted. She thinks, when Charlie tells Keith and Craig that he wants them out, that he intends to live there. Keith decides that he and Craig will move to Sheffield but Craig doesn't want to leave Coronation Street as his girlfriend, Rosie (Helen Flanagan), lives there too. Initially Keith agrees to stay but after an angina attack, he is told by the doctor that it is a warning and things have to change. Keith tells Craig that they are moving to Bournemouth with Keith's sister, Marjorie. Craig is determined that he won't leave the street but Keith and Rosie's mother Sally (Sally Dynevor) persuade him and they leave. Keith later returns to the Street when Craig runs away from Bournemouth and refuses to return there.

== Nathan Cooper ==
Nathan Cooper
- Coronation Street character
- Portrayed by: Ray Fearon
- Duration: 2005–2006
- First appearance: 1 April 2005
- Last appearance: 19 July 2006
In-universe information
- Other names: Nathan Harding
- Occupation: Mechanic

Nathan Cooper (also Harding) is played by Ray Fearon. He first appears in 2005 when Kevin Webster (Michael Le Vell) is looking for a new mechanic, following the death of Tommy Harris (Thomas Craig). Nathan leaves the job after breaking up with his girlfriend Frankie Baldwin (Debra Stephenson) largely to do with the fact her ex-husband, Danny (Bradley Walsh) is still in the picture.

In his final scene he punches Danny as he leaves the cobbles. He had previously romanced factory machinist Joanne Jackson (Zaraah Abrahams) as well as Tracy Barlow (Kate Ford), while he also enjoyed a brief flirtation with hairdresser Maria Sutherland (Samia Ghadie) in The Rovers Return Inn. His fiery temperament is revealed when he almost blinds Ashley Peacock (Steven Arnold) when they argue over their women while giving him boxing lessons.

== Louise Hazell ==
Louise Hazel
- Coronation Street character
- Portrayed by: Nora Jane Noone
- First appearance: 1 April 2005
- Last appearance: 12 June 2005
In-universe information
- Sons: Ben Hazell

Louise Hazell, played by Nora Jane Noone, meets Steve McDonald (Simon Gregson) on the Red Rec. He is immediately attracted to her and when she says she's going into town he organises a free taxi. Steve is delighted the taxi driver gives him a note from Louise with her phone number on it. On 3 April 2005, Louise enjoys a drink with Steve, much to the indignation of his ex Tracy Barlow (Kate Ford). Louise is unfazed by Tracy and tells her to move on and leave her and Steve alone. Steve keeps Louise waiting in the pub while he comforts Tracy following the sudden death of her father Ray Langton (Neville Buswell).

When he finally arrives at the Rovers and convinces Louise to go home with him and the couple then sleep together. On 13 April 2005, Louise shares a sad farewell with Steve as she has to return to Ireland. Louise returns to the Street on 12 June 2005, as she is visiting relatives and calls to Steve, who is delighted. However, Tracy threatens Louise telling her to leave Steve alone.

== Carol Baldwin ==
Carol Baldwin (also Saunders) was played by Lynne Pearson. Carol is the first ex-wife of Danny (Bradley Walsh), and the mother of Jamie (Rupert Hill).

== Viv Baldwin ==
Viv Baldwin
- Coronation Street character
- Portrayed by: Patricia Brake
- Duration: 2005–2006
- First appearance: 29 July 2005
- Last appearance: 18 December 2006
In-universe information
- Occupation: Retired
- Husband: Harry Baldwin (1961–2005)
- Sons: Danny Baldwin
- Grandsons: Jamie Baldwin; Warren Baldwin
- Other relatives: Frankie Baldwin (daughter-in law, 1986–2006)

Vivian "Viv" Baldwin is the mother of Danny Baldwin (Bradley Walsh). She is first seen on the street in July 2005, following her husband Harry's death and later revealing to her brother-in-law Mike (Johnny Briggs) that he is in fact Danny's biological father, not Harry. Viv makes a reappearance in Weatherfield at Christmas 2005, when the family go out to Christmas dinner.

In December 2006, she returns enquiring about her son's disappearance, only to find out the truth about her grandson Jamie's (Rupert Hill) affair with his former stepmother and her and Mike's daughter-in law Frankie Baldwin (Debra Stephenson). After finding this, Viv storms back home to London.

== Freda Burgess ==
Freda Burgess
- Coronation Street character
- Portrayed by: Ali Briggs
- Duration: 2005–2006, 2009–2010, 2019–2021
- First appearance: Episode 6089; 8 August 2005
- Last appearance: Episode 10439; 24 September 2021
- Introduced by: Steve Frost (2005); Kim Crowther (2009); Iain MacLeod (2019)
In-universe information
- Father: Sidney Burgess
- Mother: Edie Burgess
- Grandfathers: George Bishop
- Grandmothers: Caroline Bishop
- Uncles: Ernest Bishop

Freda Burgess, played by Ali Briggs, is the deaf niece of Ernest Bishop (Stephen Hancock). In August 2005, Freda came to visit her aunt Emily Bishop (Eileen Derbyshire), but got a frosty reception from Emily's lodger, Norris Cole (Malcolm Hebden), who thought she was after Emily's money. Freda helped Emily when she fell down the stairs and sprained her ankle, but left due to Norris' treatment of her.

In July 2009, Freda returned. She revealed to Emily that she was engaged, but her fiancé was in prison. She took a dislike to Emily's new friend, Ramsay Clegg (Andrew Sachs), as she found his over-eagerness to please everyone annoying. Norris was thrilled, as he disliked his brother too and felt they had something in common. After staying a few days, Freda left again.

On 3 May 2019, Freda returns to sell Emily and Norris' house, leading to Mary Cole (Patti Clare) accusing Freda of murdering Norris, who later turns up to announce that he and Freda are getting married and moving to Scotland. In 2020, Freda and Norris are shown to be living in Stillwaters, a gated community.

Freda reappears again in June 2021 when discussing the pros and cons of Baby Aled’s hearing operation with Gemma Winter (Dolly-Rose Campbell) and Chesney Brown (Sam Aston). Three months later, Freda meets Mary, Ken Barlow (William Roache) and Rita Tanner (Barbara Knox) at Weatherfield General to tell them Norris has died, following a stroke. She is still in contact with Gemma and Chesney, because in 2022 it is mentioned that she is looking after the quads and Chesney's son Joseph while everyone is out celebrating Gemma and Paul Foreman's (Peter Ash) birthday.

== Phil Nail ==
Phil Nail
- Coronation Street character
- Portrayed by: Clive Russell
- Duration: 2005–2006
- First appearance: 15 August 2005
- Last appearance: 27 March 2006
In-universe information
- Occupation: Reflexologist

Phil Nail, played by Scottish actor Clive Russell, works at the Medical Centre on Rosamund Street as a reflexologist. He quickly begins a relationship with receptionist Gail Platt (Helen Worth). Phil is very interested in the Platt family's experience with Richard Hillman (Brian Capron) because he is undertaking a Criminology course. Gail trusts Phil; she even allows him to record interviews with her children about their experiences with Richard.

Gail's son David Platt (Jack P. Shepherd) does not like Phil; in fact, he despises him knowing that Phil is only wanting to know about Richard and that he does not care about Gail's children. He even begins a campaign to stop the relationship between Phil and Gail. One such example is when Phil's hand is badly injured when David intentionally slams it with a car boot lid. Another is where Phil pins David up against a wall and threatens him. David has become unhappy ever since his father Martin (Sean Wilson) has left and he does not like another man in the house telling him what to do, as that is his father's job. Eventually, Phil leaves the street after Gail discovers that Phil attacked David. Phil is a suspect when Gail begins receiving a series of hoax letters claiming to be from the deceased Richard in 2006. The culprit is later revealed to have been David.

== Robyn Platt ==
Robyn Platt
- Coronation Street character
- Portrayed by: Clare Calbraith
- First appearance: 23 September 2005
- Last appearance: 9 November 2005
In-universe information
- Husband: Martin Platt (2006–present)
- Daughters: Charlotte Platt
- Stepsons: David Platt; Nick Tilsley (adoptive)
- Stepdaughters: Sarah Platt (adoptive)

Robyn Platt is played by Clare Calbraith. Robyn is the girlfriend (later wife) of Martin Platt (Sean Wilson). She made her first appearance on 23 September 2005 and made her last appearance on 9 November 2005. She was portrayed by Claire Calbraith. In September 2005, Robyn made her first appearance as a mascot. However, the actress who portrayed her, Clare Calbraith, was uncredited although it still counted as her first appearance. A month later, in October 2005, Robyn reappeared and she and Martin began a relationship. However, Robyn thought Martin was stringing her along and dumped him at the Rovers Return Inn over her suspicions but they soon reconciled that month.

Martin began to reject his son, David Platt (Jack P. Shepherd), for Robyn and at 8 Coronation Street, which was holding a farewell bonfire for Martin and Robyn, who were leaving for a new life in Liverpool in November, David realised that Martin wanted Robyn and not him. David's mother and Martin's ex-wife, Gail Platt (Helen Worth), and Robyn were furious with Martin for this and Martin decided to make it up to him by spending time with him but David rejected his father. However, he and Martin reconciled before he departed for Liverpool with Robyn. David told Robyn to take good care of his father; Robyn replied that she will. David visited Martin and Robyn in January 2006 and revealed that Robyn was pregnant with Martin's baby and their daughter was born later that year.

== Ronnie Clayton ==
Veronica "Ronnie" Clayton was played by Emma Stansfield. Ronnie first appeared on 3 October 2005. She used to be married to gangster Jimmy Clayton (David Crellin) and works for his cab firm. She leaves Jimmy and starts working under Steve McDonald (Simon Gregson) at Streetcars. Ronnie departed in 2006.

== Jimmy Clayton ==
Jimmy Clayton
- Coronation Street character
- Portrayed by: David Crellin
- First appearance: 7 October 2005
- Last appearance: 26 December 2005
- Introduced by: Tony Wood
In-universe information
- Occupation: Taxicab company owner
- Wife: Ronnie Clayton (backstory)
- Sons: Nick Clayton

Jimmy Clayton, played by David Crellin, was the ex-husband of Ronnie Clayton (Emma Stansfield), who owned a Taxicab company named Connect Cabs. This was Crellin's first role on the soap, as he returned in 2010 to play Colin Fishwick. He arrived at Street Cars on Ronnie's first day working for Eileen Grimshaw (Sue Cleaver) and Lloyd Mullaney (Craig Charles) advising them not to employ her. He asked if either of them had seen her yet, but they both denied they had to protect her. When Steve McDonald (Simon Gregson) returned, Lloyd advised him that Jimmy was trouble. After discovering that they had employed Ronnie, Jimmy began to threaten Street Cars and Lloyd began to have reservations, but Steve was happy to continue to employ her. Subsequently, Street Cars became the target of vandalism and hoax calls.

One day, Jimmy and his son, Nick Clayton (Paul Simpson) tried to run Lloyd's car off the road, but lost control and crashed into a barn. Jimmy was arrested and imprisoned for his crimes, but got an accomplice to break into 12 Coronation Street to leave Ronnie a Christmas present of an amethyst necklace on the kitchen table and a card instructing her to visit him in Strangeways, which she does on Boxing Day to tell him she was keeping £5000 she took as severance money and threatened to tell the police about his previous dodgy dealings.

== Nick Clayton ==
Nick Clayton
- Coronation Street character
- Portrayed by: Paul Simpson
- First appearance: 17 October 2005
- Last appearance: 7 November 2005
- Introduced by: Tony Wood
In-universe information
- Occupation: Taxicab driver
- Father: Jimmy Clayton
- Stepmother: Ronnie Clayton (backstory)

Nick Clayton, portrayed by Paul Simpson, was the son of Jimmy Clayton (David Crellin) and the stepson of Ronnie Clayton (Emma Stansfield). This was Simpson's second role on Coronation Street after playing teenager Jason Stubbs between 1988 and 1989.

Nick arrived after he and his father were approached by Ronnie's new boyfriend, Steve McDonald (Simon Gregson). He subsequently threatened Street Cars driver, Claire Peacock (Julia Haworth), who was picking up her son, Joshua Peacock (Benjamin Beresford) from a party. Nick told her she was out of depth for competing against his father's company, Connect Cabs and threatened to harm her family if she kept working for them. He follows her home to 4 Coronation Street, where her husband Ashley Peacock (Steven Arnold) punches him and sends him away. He later helps his father attack Ronnie at a farm.

== Eric Talford ==
Eric Talford
- Coronation Street character
- Portrayed by: Tony Slattery
- Duration: 2005–2006
- First appearance: 11 December 2005
- Last appearance: 19 February 2006
In-universe information
- Occupation: Bookmaker

Eric Talford is the owner of the Talford's Bookies on Rosamund Street who first appears in December 2005 and becomes the boss and love interest of Carol Baldwin (Lynne Pearson). He was first seen taking Carol on a date at the Clock restaurant. During the date, he was interrupted by his wife, who was sitting at another table. She walked over to Carol and Eric and tells her that he always books a table there when she has one booked, usually with a different woman each time, causing Carol to throw the contents of the table on the floor.

Despite the negative first experience, Carol agreed to go on a second date with Eric, this time on Christmas Day. During the meal, Carol became rowdy after a bottle of wine and argued with her ex-husband, Danny Baldwin (Bradley Walsh), who sat at a different table. Eric paid the bill and left drunken Carol to be dealt with by her son, Jamie Baldwin (Rupert Hill) and his step-mother Frankie Baldwin (Debra Stephenson). Eric was last seen uncovering a cannabis farm in the flat above his shop, which he claimed he had nothing to do with him. As a result, he pleaded his innocence to Jack Duckworth (Bill Tarmey) and Charlie Stubbs (Bill Ward).

== Other characters ==
| Character | Episode date(s) | Actor | Circumstances |
|---|---|---|---|
| Jean Harris | 21–25 March | Sue Wallace | The mother of Tommy Harris (Thomas Craig). Jean arrives to attend Tommy's funeral and is angered to discover that he is being buried as opposed to his wishes of being cremated. |
| Mr. Wong | 6 May – 23 December | Daryl Kwan | The owner of the chip shop on Rosamund Street, who hires Cilla Battersby-Brown (Wendi Peters) and Yana Lumb (Jayne Bickerton) to work for him. He speaks very limited English and is frequently seen arguing with Cilla. |
| Zack | 22 August – 21 September | Ralph Ineson | A psychiatrist who treats Shelley Unwin (Sally Lindsay) when her anxiety overtakes so much of her life that she is rarely able to leave her own room. Zack helps Shelley slowly go back to the outside world, but Shelley's boyfriend Charlie Stubbs (Bill Ward) resents Zack's efforts to help, and eventually convinces Shelley to stop seeing him. Shelley progresses far enough that she manages to dump Charlie moments before she is to become his wife. After getting away from Charlie, she calls Zack to tell him the news. He says that he is proud of her, and both agree to continue therapy until she is fully recovered. |
| Billy Brown | 31 October | Jay Martin | The eldest son of Cilla Battersby-Brown (Wendi Peters), who attends her wedding to Les Battersby (Bruce Jones) and informs his mother that he is joining the army. Billy is more recently mentioned when younger brother Chesney Brown (Sam Aston) runs away from home to visit him in 2009. |
| Ravinder Kalirai | 9 November – 26 May 2006 | Mina Anwar | The mother of Amber Kalirai (Nikki Patel). She tells her the truth about her father Dev Alahan (Jimmi Harkishin). The following summer, Ravinder meets a new man and decides relocate to Finland with him. After falling out with Dev, Amber goes to stay with Ravinder for several weeks in November 2008. |
| Nicolette Seddon | 28 November – 9 December | Natalie Richards | The daughter of Sally Webster's (Sally Dynevor) cousin, Paul (Ken Bradshaw). This is revealed when Sally's daughter Sophie (Brooke Vincent) brings her home one day as a new friend and they mention they had traced their family trees and discovered they are related. Sally sees Nicolette as a bad influence on Sophie and later visits Nicolette's house - when she discovers that Nicolette's father is successful and wealthy, much to her chagrin. After a heated exchange with Paul and his wife Suzanne (Fiona Gillies), Sally decides not to keep in touch with that branch of the Seddon family tree. |
| Paul Seddon | 9 December | Ken Bradshaw | The distant cousin of Sally Webster (Sally Dynevor) and father of Nicolette (Natalie Richards), who recently discovered her and fellow student and Sally's daughter, Sophie (Brooke Vincent) were distantly related. He and his wife Suzanne (Fiona Gillies) decide not to keep in touch with Sally's branch of the family. |
| Suzanne Seddon | 9 December | Fiona Gillies | The wife of Paul (Ken Bradshaw) and mother of Nicolette (Natalie Richards). |
