= Craig Harris (Coronation Street) =

Fictional character in British soap opera

- Coronation Street character
- Portrayed by: Richard Fleeshman
- Duration: 2002–2006
- First appearance: 13 November 2002
- Last appearance: 16 October 2006
- Introduced by: Kieran Roberts
In-universe information
- Other names: Craig Nelson
- Occupation: Student
- Father: Tommy Harris
- Mother: Angela Harris
- Sisters: Katy Harris
- Grandfathers: Keith Appleyard
- Grandmothers: Shirley Appleyard; Jean Harris
- Aunts: Lorraine Appleyard; Pauline Appleyard

Craig Harris (also Nelson) is a fictional character from the British ITV soap opera Coronation Street, played by Richard Fleeshman. He made his first on-screen appearance on 13 November 2002, before departing in 2006. Craig is the youngest child in the Harris family and his storylines centred on his family's victimisation by a gang and his relationship with Rosie Webster (Helen Flanagan).

== Casting and development ==
Richard Fleeshman was cast in the role in 2002. Fleeshman's parents David Fleeshman and Sue Jenkins had also starred in Coronation Street as Mr. Austin and Gloria Todd respectively. ITV announced in early June 2006 that Richard Fleeshman would be leaving the soap in the autumn of 2006. It was his decision to quit the role of Craig Harris in order to pursue a pop career. Fleeshman filmed his final scenes in late August 2006 and his final episode aired on 16 October 2006.

== Storylines ==
Craig is the son of Angela (Kathryn Hunt) and Tommy Harris (Thomas Craig). He enters the series in November 2002 as Craig Nelson, under the witness protection programme. His mother Angela has witnessed a murder in their home city of Sheffield and the family move away to Weatherfield. He later uses his real surname Harris once the family's cover is blown and they decide to stay in Weatherfield. Soon, Craig befriends David Platt (Jack P. Shepherd), Rosie Webster (Helen Flanagan) and Bradley Diggins. The quartet begin causing trouble for Norris Cole (Malcolm Hebden) and Rita Sullivan (Barbara Knox) by kicking their football against the garage doors. Eventually, they begin making threats when Norris and Rita confiscate their ball, leading to Norris bursting the ball with a pair of scissors. This was all resolved when Tommy took the money off Norris for damages and the quartet went back to school.

When his sister Katy Harris (Lucy-Jo Hudson) starts dating David's father Martin Platt (Sean Wilson), her father's friend, who is 20 years older than she is, it causes Tommy and Angela to split up. An upset Craig tampers with the brakes on Martin's car, hoping to split Martin and Katy up and bring back peace to his family. Unfortunately, Katy gets in the car with Martin and they crash into a wall. Craig tells his father and they race to the rescue. Martin decides not to press charges once he finds out the truth. Soon, David and Craig fight after having an argument over the incident. Tommy and Angela get back together when they realise how much their problems are affecting Craig.

Craig starts dating Rosie in spring 2004, and this infuriates Rosie's mother Sally Webster (Sally Dynevor) as she is trying to get Rosie to focus on her schooling Sally begins getting in the way of them both but this fails. In early-2005, the pair become goths, pushing Sally and Rosie's father Kevin Webster (Michael Le Vell) to breaking point. Together they immerse in emo subculture listening to heavy metal music. He even gets his tongue pierced. Craig and Rosie eventually decide to sleep together, but at the last minute decide that it would be best not to. However, Tommy finds a condom Craig had been planning to use and, thinking his son has slept with Rosie, punches him in the face and knocks him out. Soon, Tommy finds out Rosie stole the condom from Sally and confronts the pair, but soon everything is put right and Craig and Rosie carry on seeing each other.

Despite this, Craig is devastated when his father is killed in March 2005, after sustaining a blow to the head with a wrench. He discovers that Katy committed manslaughter after discovering Tommy had lied to her over Martin having an affair, which caused her to abort her and Martin's unborn baby. Katy confronted Tommy and he infuriated her so much that she grabbed a wrench and hit him. Angela takes the blame for his death, despite seeing what Katy has done and is sent to prison. A guilty Katy, also a diabetic, swallows a deadly solution of water and sugar and dies two weeks later. All of this caused Craig to lose his family in a month, and he soon split up with Rosie after seeing how ungrateful she is to have family around. Craig then lives with grandfather Keith Appleyard (Ian Redford), who, having decided that Craig has suffered enough problems, chooses to move to Weatherfield rather than taking Craig back to Sheffield. Craig and Rosie reunite, and he gets a part-time job at Dev Alahan's (Jimmi Harkishin) corner shop.

Soon, the pair decide to have sex and sleep together despite being underage and Keith and his partner Audrey Roberts (Sue Nicholls) catch Rosie trying to sneak out of the house the morning afterwards. Later, Rosie and Audrey talk and Audrey decides to let the matter go, on the condition they never sleep together again. However, Craig and Rosie do not listen and they sleep together again on New Year's Eve 2005. Sally goes round to wish the pair a Happy New Year, but Craig answers the door in a dressing gown, thinking it was a pizza delivery. After seeing Rosie's dress lying on the sofa, Sally goes upstairs to find a naked Rosie in Craig's bed, leading her to drag Rosie back home and banish her upstairs. Sally forces her to take a morning after pill.

The pair are banned from seeing each other, despite their protests, and are put through hell when Rosie's parents get the police involved in the incident. The police refuse to take action, and soon Rosie decides to go on a school trip to prove nothing can stop their relationship. After a while, Craig is unfaithful to Rosie by seeing friend Suzy Watkins. Rosie's sister Sophie Webster (Brooke Vincent) finds out and tells Rosie, who splits up with Craig. They get back together hours later. Weeks later, Sally intends to get Rosie into a private boarding school. When she sees Rosie and Craig kissing, Sally kidnaps her daughter, leaving Craig worried. He tells Kevin about it, and eventually catches up with Sally and Rosie and brings them back safely. After Rosie is run over by a car a month later, Sally and Kevin warm towards Craig after seeing how devoted he is to Rosie, and Kevin offers Craig an apprenticeship at his garage (incidentally, this is where Craig's father Tommy worked and was murdered).

In early summer, Craig is devastated when Keith has an angina attack, and even more upset when builder Charlie Stubbs (Bill Ward) is evicting them from their house. Keith says they have no choice but to move away somewhere new for a fresh start, and Craig tells Sally and Sophie about it. Soon, Craig starts hiding in his old house, but is quickly caught out when Charlie's girlfriend Tracy Barlow (Kate Ford) notices strange going-ons in the house. After learning that Rosie is going away on a school trip and that he would not get to see her, Craig decides to tell Rosie about him leaving Weatherfield for a fresh start. Rosie is angered that her mother and sister knew about it all along, and after seeing how upset she is, Craig decides to stay with the Websters and bids Keith a farewell. Rosie returns in August, and they begin living in a squat, much to the disgust of Sally and Kevin. Eventually, Craig moves in with Hayley (Julie Hesmondhalgh) and Roy Cropper (David Neilson), but Craig does not really bond with them.

Weeks later, Craig and Rosie hatch a plan to run away to Berlin together, to start a new life in Germany. The pair decide that the Websters' family holiday to Paris for their 20th wedding anniversary is the perfect opportunity. Before they leave for the holiday, Craig sees best friend David one last time and bids him farewell. When the Websters and Craig arrive in Paris, Craig and Rosie enjoy their last day together with the family and later slip away to pack their bags. Rosie leaves a note to her family saying she is sorry for everything. The Websters search frantically for her as Craig and Rosie are about to board the train. However, Rosie looks at a photo of her family and freezes. She tells Craig that she cannot leave her family behind. After a long and tearful goodbye, Craig vows to Rosie that he will always love her and tears himself away from Paris, Weatherfield and a devastated Rosie. It was revealed by Rosie a week later that Craig had begun work at a hostel with his friend in Berlin.

== Reception ==
The underage sex storyline was controversial.

== See also ==
- List of former Coronation Street characters
