= Katy Harris =

Fictional character from Coronation Street

- Coronation Street character
- Portrayed by: Lucy-Jo Hudson
- Duration: 2002–2005
- First appearance: 13 November 2002
- Last appearance: 20 April 2005
- Introduced by: Kieran Roberts
In-universe information
- Other names: Katy Nelson
- Occupation: Student; Hospital caterer
- Father: Tommy Harris
- Mother: Angela Harris
- Brothers: Craig Harris
- Grandfathers: Keith Appleyard
- Grandmothers: Shirley Appleyard; Jean Harris
- Aunts: Lorraine Appleyard; Pauline Appleyard

Katy Harris (also Nelson) is a fictional character from the British ITV soap opera Coronation Street, portrayed by Lucy-Jo Hudson. Hudson made her on-screen appearance as Katy Harris for the first time on November 13th 2002. The character was featured in several high-profile narratives before her departure from the series in 2005. As the teenage daughter of the Harris family, her primary storylines focused on her family's victimization by a local gang, her diagnosis with type 1 diabetes, and her controversial relationship with the significantly older Martin Platt (Sean Wilson).

Katy's departure from the series occurred during a highly publicized storyline dubbed "Killer Katy" by the media. In this narrative arc, she undergoes an abortion, kills her father during a heated confrontation, and subsequently commits suicide. The sequence remains recognized as one of the most sensational and shocking storylines in the history of the program.

== Development ==
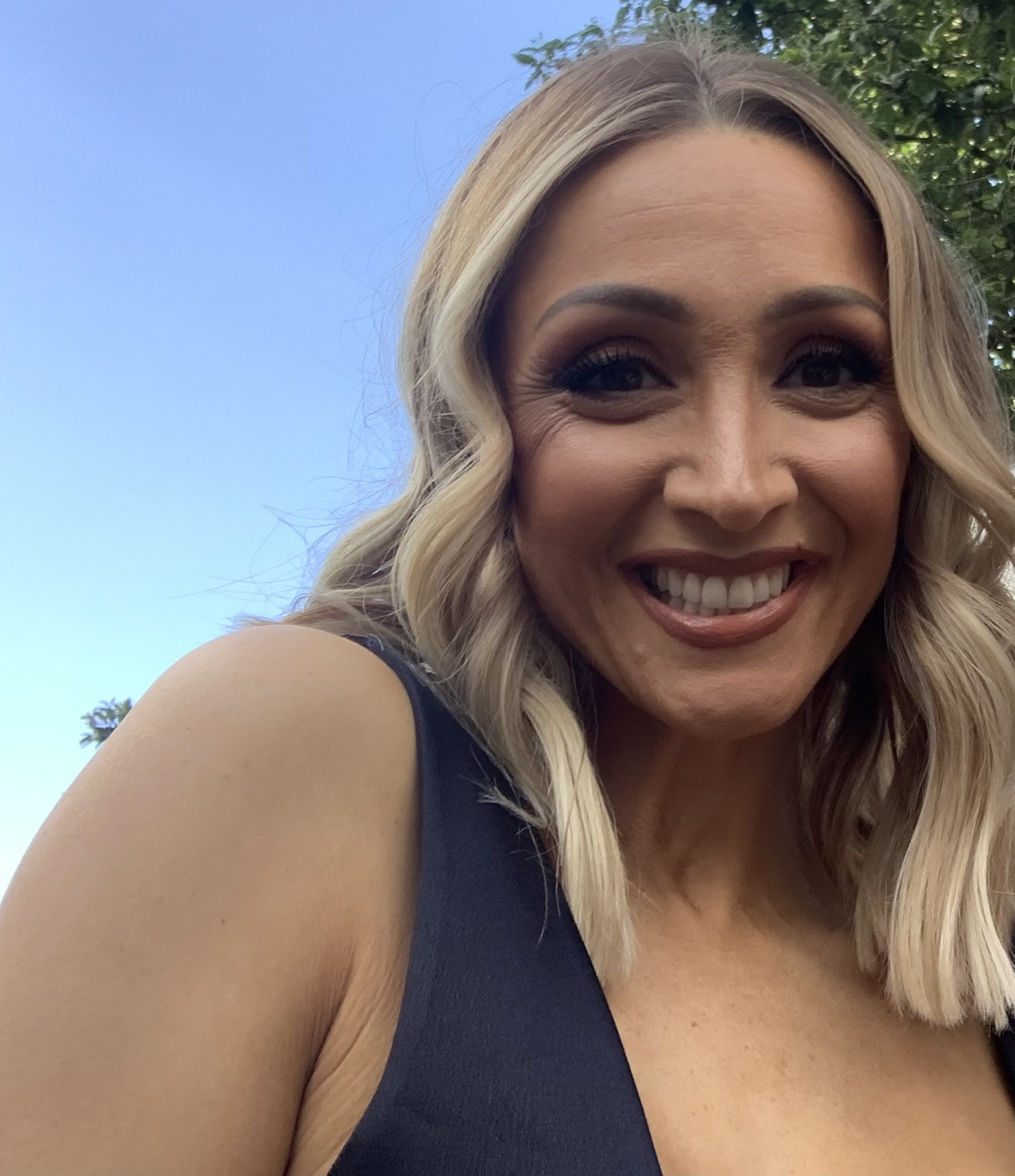
Lucy-Jo Hudson (pictured) played Katy for just over two years.

Hudson expressed satisfaction with leaving the series and criticized the production team for failing to provide the Harris family with adequate storylines. Additionally, she noted that the talent of Richard Fleeshman, who portrayed Katy's brother Craig, had been underutilized during his early tenure on the show. During Hudson's stint on the soap, Katy briefly dates Tyrone Dobbs (Alan Halsall); Halsall and Hudson later married in real life in 2009.

Reflecting on her character's dramatic exit, Hudson welcomed the shift in Katy's personality, noting that playing a more volatile character was preferable to portraying a conventional schoolgirl. She expressed enthusiasm for filming the violent confrontation between Katy and her father, Tommy. She revealed that she had requested a dramatic conclusion to her character's arc rather than a mundane departure. Hudson praised the high-stakes narrative which included an abortion and a separation from Martin Platt, and patricide. She also embraced the media's "Killer Katy" moniker for the storyline.

== Storylines ==
In November 2002, Katy relocates to Coronation Street alongside her father Tommy (Thomas Craig), her mother Angela (Kathryn Hunt), and her younger brother Craig (Richard Fleeshman). The family, originally surnamed Nelson, had relocated to Manchester from Sheffield under a witness protection program because Angela was scheduled to testify in a gangland murder trial. While living under their assumed identities, Tommy secures employment as a mechanic for Kevin Webster (Michael Le Vell), Angela works at the Underworld garment factory, and Katy attends school, where she develops a rivalry with Candice Stowe (Nikki Sanderson) and briefly dates Tyrone Dobbs (Alan Halsall).

Katy sneaks away to see her friends in Sheffield and is followed back to Coronation Street by the brother of the defendant her mother is due to testify against. The two brothers come to Weatherfield to kill the family. Sally Webster (Sally Dynevor) tells them where the family lives, thinking they are friends of the family, and then they break into the house and keep Katy hostage in the family home. When the residents of the Street finds out about the hostage situation, the police are called. When Tommy hears Katy scream, he runs inside and is shot and hospitalised. Katy survives too and her captors are arrested, but the family's true identity became common knowledge, so the family resumed using the surname Harris.

Katy discovers that she is diabetic, and her nurse and neighbour Martin Platt (Sean Wilson), helps her to get used to giving herself daily injections of insulin. The pair develop a romantic relationship, even though Martin is nearly 20 years older than Katy, almost as old as her father. When her parents find out about the relationship, they are unsupportive. Tommy hates Martin for having sex with his daughter and brands him a pervert. The other residents of the street also reject their relationship. After Martin is injured in a car crash after being pursued by Tommy, Angela tries to reconcile with her daughter. Katy befriends Martin's children Sarah (Tina O'Brien) and David Platt (Jack P. Shepherd). In May 2004, Martin and Katy split up after Katy reveals she knew that Todd Grimshaw (Bruno Langley) was cheating on Sarah with her friend Karl Foster (Chris Finch). When Sarah miscarries her son Billy, Martin and Katy decide to get back together and they later plan to have a baby together. Katy befriends Violet Wilson (Jenny Platt). Katy is kissed by Warren Baldwin (Danny Young) and this is seen by Martin.

Katy becomes pregnant in early 2005, but her father starts a rumour that Martin is back together with his ex-wife Gail Platt (Helen Worth) and is being unfaithful to Katy. Angela overhears Gail talking to Sally Webster about her affair with Ian Davenport (Philip Bretherton) and assumes that she is talking about Martin. She tells Tommy what she heard and he feels vindicated. They also see Martin and Sally talking and spending time together at Martin and Katy's flat. Other coincidences make Angela and Tommy certain that Martin and Sally are having an affair and they tell Katy, who is heartbroken. She breaks up with Martin and is convinced by her parents to have an abortion. On hearing the affair rumour herself, Gail goes to Angela and Tommy and tells them that Martin and Sally were only good friends and that Sally is having an affair with someone else. Angela is regretful, but Tommy is arrogant and the two of them have a massive argument. Katy comes downstairs and Angela told her the truth. Katy is mortified to find out Martin really was faithful and she leaves the house to confront her father at the garage while he is working late at night. Katy is emotional and blames her father for her abortion. Tommy is unapologetic, ridiculing Katy and taunting her about her abortion and implying Martin is a paedophile. In the spur of the moment, she lashes out and hits him over the head with a wrench, killing him. Angela walks in just as Tommy falls to the floor. She persuades Katy not to call the police and they stage a break-in. When Tommy's body is found the next morning by Kevin Webster (Michael Le Vell), Angela and Katy go through the pretence that Tommy had been killed by an unknown intruder. In the murder investigation, Martin Platt is the top suspect. Having to lie to Martin and her brother Craig makes Katy feel guilty. Katy's grandfather Keith Appleyard (Ian Redford) move into the family home to help look after his grandchildren.

Angela plans to dispose of the murder weapon but does not get the opportunity, and tries to persuade the police that the gang had killed Tommy and asks for the family to be given new identities. Katy struggles to deal with the situation, but Angela tries to help her cope. When the family visit the funeral parlour to view Tommy's body, Angela hides the wrench inside the coffin. Katy is left alone when forensic evidence led to Angela's arrest. Katy and Craig return to Sheffield with their grandfather. After a few weeks, Katy returned to the street and decided she cannot live with the guilt any longer and writes a note confessing the truth about her father's death before she dies by suicide. She ends her life by destroying her insulin cartridges and drinking water mixed with sugar (a deadly solution because of her diabetes). The Platt family hear the TV next door of the supposedly vacant house. Martin breaks down the door and finds her lying unconscious on the sofa with the note beside her. She is taken to hospital, but dies two weeks later. Angela is cleared of murder but receives new charges for perverting the course of justice and is imprisoned for six to eight years.

== Reception ==
The murder–suicide storyline was described as controversial. Alex Ross from Planet Radio noted how Katy was very popular with fans during her time on the soap.
