= Tommy Harris (Coronation Street) =

Fictional character in Coronation Street

- Coronation Street character
- Portrayed by: Thomas Craig
- Duration: 2002–2005
- First appearance: 13 November 2002
- Last appearance: 7 March 2005
- Introduced by: Kieran Roberts
- Book appearances: Coronation Street: The Complete Saga
In-universe information
- Other names: Tommy Nelson
- Occupation: Mechanic
- Mother: Jean Harris
- Wife: Angela Appleyard (1985–2005)
- Sons: Craig Harris
- Daughters: Katy Harris

Thomas "Tommy" Harris (previously Nelson) is a fictional character from the British ITV soap opera Coronation Street, played by Thomas Craig. He made her first on-screen appearance on 13 November 2002, before departing in March 2005. Tommy is the patriarch of the Harris family, and his storylines centred on her family's victimisation by a gang and his relationships with his wife and children.

His departing storyline was entitled "Killer Katy", in which he was murdered by his daughter Katy (Lucy-Jo Hudson) during a heated argument, which was described as one of the soap's most sensational and shocking storylines.

== Casting and development ==
Actor Thomas Craig was cast as Tommy Harris. Craig was previously known for his role in the ITV series Where the Heart Is. The four members of the Harris family were introduced in November 2002, described as a "working class family" with a "dark secret". They moved into the house formerly occupied by Matt Ramsden (Stephen Beckett) and Charlie Ramsden (Clare McGlinn). Tommy was a mechanic who worked at Kevin Webster's (Michael Le Vell) garage. Tommy was characterised as a thuggish father known for violence and bigotry. He was described as "TV's angriest man".

In 2003, one storyline saw Tommy cut the brakes of Martin Platt's (Sean Wilson) car. When the storyline was announced, Coronation Street bosses had not decided whether Martin would die or survive. In February 2004, it was reported that Tommy and Angela would be written out in the following year. The exit storyline was expected to produce ratings similar to the Richard Hillman (Brian Capron) storyline in 2003. In December 2004, the Daily Star reported that Katy would kill her father by stabbing him in the chest with a kitchen knife. In 2005, Craig said he was relieved to be leaving the soap saying, "I think I'm a decent actor and I don't think they used me enough".

== Storylines ==
Tommy and his wife Angela (Kathryn Hunt) and their children Katy (Lucy-Jo Hudson) and Craig (Richard Fleeshman) first appear on the street in November 2002. The family rented Number 6 and using the last name "Nelson" as they were part of a Witness Protection Programme. They originally came from Sheffield where Angela worked in a pub and witnessed a murder and gave evidence in court against the accused. They were given a new identity as the Nelson family and moved to Weatherfield.

Tommy is a trained mechanic and Sheffield Wednesday F.C. supporter, and was soon hired by Kevin Webster (Michael Le Vell) at the garage, using references supplied by the Witness Protection team. Soon after, Kevin found a wallet containing a union card with the name Tommy Harris. Tommy took it when he found it lying where Kevin had left it but Kevin, when realizing Tommy had the wallet, accused him of stealing. Tommy could not explain away the situation and was sacked. Eventually however, Tommy takes Kevin into his confidence and is re-hired. In April 2003, Katy slipped away to visit friends in Sheffield against her parents warnings. When she returns home she is followed to Weatherfield by the brothers of the man who was jailed on Angela's evidence. There is a siege at the Harris's house and Tommy is shot in the process and nearly loses his arm in subsequent surgery. The family decide to stay in Weatherfield even though their cover is blown and so they resume using their real name Harris.

When neighbour Richard Hillman (Brian Capron) kidnaps Gail Platt (Helen Worth) and her family, Tommy chases after their car with Martin Platt (Sean Wilson). When he drives into the canal, Tommy helps Martin save Gail, Sarah (Tina O'Brien), David (Jack P. Shepherd), and Bethany, and is seen as a hero. In late 2003, Tommy and Angela decide to separate after relationship trouble when they find out Katy is dating Martin. The couple disapprove, but Angela cannot bear to be estranged from her daughter. The relationship is controversial within the families and Tommy tries to keep her locked in at home. Tommy is adamant that if Angela was stay in touch with Katy, he was not going to be a part of it. Angela decides to leave briefly but returns and insists that Tommy had left. Tommy begins drinking which eventually causes Kevin to fire him from his garage. Tommy moves out and lives in the flat over StreetCars, and is jobless for a while. When he gambles away his sons computer money, this causes further trouble.

Shortly before Christmas, his son Craig, upset that his family is torn apart, tampers with the brakes on Martin's car. He admits to his father what he had done, but before Tommy can fix the damage, they see Katy drive off with Martin and so the decide to follow them. When the car stops and Katy gets out of the car, she sees her father following Martin and called him to warn him. She believes that Tommy is going to kill Martin when in fact Tommy was trying to get Martin's attention to make him pull over. The two cars get into a high speed chase and Martin crashes the car into a wall. Tommy pulls him out before the car explodes but takes the blame for the brake failure so Craig does not get into trouble. Craig struggles to cope with his guilt and confesses to Martin who tells the police he knew his brakes were bad and had not got them checked. He makes an uneasy peace with Tommy and Angela, but Tommy still does not accept Martin being with his daughter.

In 2004, Tommy clashes with his son over his relationship with Rosie Webster (Helen Flanagan) and their choice of gothic lifestyle. He attempts to accept his sons choice after prompting from his wife. In February 2005, he assaults Craig in the street when a condom packet falls from his pocket. In early 2005, Katy tells Angela and Tommy that she is pregnant and they were not happy. In March, Tommy sees Martin and Sally Webster (Sally Dynevor) together and assumes they were having an affair. He tells Katy and when Angela overhears Sally and Gail talking, she too believed it and they tell Katy together. Katy initially does not believe them, knowing how negatively her father feels about Martin. As her mother Angela agrees, Katy thinks it's true. Devastated, Katy splits up with Martin and Tommy and Angela encourage her to have an abortion which she does. Angela is mortified to find out from Gail that Sally is having an affair with somebody else, and that Martin really was faithful to Katy and she had the abortion for nothing. Angela and Tommy have a huge argument and her last words to him are "just drop dead". Shortly after, Katy and Tommy argue furiously in the garage and Katy strikes her father with a wrench just as Angela walks in. Tommy dies in Angela's arms but she decides to cover up the crime and make it look like a robbery gone wrong to protect her daughter. Angela and Katy attempt to pretend that the Sheffield gang is responsible. When Angela is charged for the murder of her husband she takes the blame. The weight of the guilt leads to Katy committing suicide. She leaves a confession note admitting the truth At Katy's funeral, Angela blames Martin for everything that happened.

== Reception ==
The character of Tommy was described as inconsistent with one review saying "the writers couldn't decide whether Tommy was a solid, salt-of-the-Earth football dad who was just over-protective or a nasty bully". The murder–suicide storyline was described as controversial. It has been called one of the soaps biggest storylines. The actress Maureen Lipman called the storyline "ludicrous". The Northern Echo compared the scenes to a "Greek tragedy". Jessica Gibb from the Daily Mirror described it as one of the soap's most sensational and shocking storylines. Coronation Street narrowly beat EastEnders in the ratings for 2005.
