= Angela Harris (Coronation Street) =

Fictional character in Coronation Street

- Coronation Street character
- Portrayed by: Kathryn Hunt
- Duration: 2002–2005
- First appearance: 13 November 2002
- Last appearance: 2 May 2005
- Introduced by: Kieran Roberts
In-universe information
- Other names: Angela Nelson
- Occupation: Factory worker
- Father: Keith Appleyard
- Mother: Shirley Appleyard
- Sisters: Lorraine Appleyard; Pauline Appleyard
- Husband: Tommy Harris (until 2005)
- Sons: Craig Harris
- Daughters: Katy Harris
- Aunts: Marjorie Appleyard

Angela Harris (also Nelson) is a fictional character from the British ITV soap opera Coronation Street, played by Kathryn Hunt. She made her first on-screen appearance on 13 November 2002, before departing in 2005. Angela is the matriarch of the Harris family, and her storylines centred on her family's victimisation by a gang and her relationships with her husband and children.

Her departing storyline was entitled "Killer Katy", in which her daughter Katy (Lucy-Jo Hudson) had an abortion and killed her father during a heated argument. Angela took the blame for the crime but following her daughters suicide she was jailed for perverting the course of justice. It was described as one of the soap's most sensational and shocking storylines.

== Casting and development ==
The four members of the Harris family were introduced in November 2002, described as a "working class family" with a "dark secret". They moved into the house formerly occupied by Matt Ramsden (Stephen Beckett) and Charlie Ramsden (Clare McGlinn). In March 2004, her contract was renewed for another year. Katy, Tommy and Angela were written out of the show in 2005.

== Storylines ==
Angela and her husband Tommy (Thomas Craig) and their children Katy (Lucy-Jo Hudson) and Craig (Richard Fleeshman) first appear on the street in November 2002. The family rent Number 6 and use the last name "Nelson" as they are part of a Witness Protection Programme.

They originally came from Sheffield where Angela worked in a pub and witnesses a murder and gives evidence against the accused in court. The family are given a new identity, and the Nelson family moves to Weatherfield. When the nosy neighbours Maxine Peacock (Tracy Shaw) and her mother Doreen Heavey (Prunella Gee) knock on the door, Angela fearfully cowers in the house unable to face her new neighbours. Soon after the move the relatives of the perpetrator take their revenge with threats against the family, and eventually try to burn down their house.

Angela gets a job in the local factory, Underworld, but it does not go well, due to her colleagues asking her uncomfortable questions. Tommy finds work in a garage, owned by Kevin Webster (Michael Le Vell), and is under suspicion of stealing a wallet, which causes the factory workers to turn against Angela, and she suffers workplace bullying. Only Hayley Cropper (Julie Hesmondhalgh) makes friends with Angela and eventually finds out the truth about the family, but promises to keep her secret. She later makes friends with Janice Battersby (Vicky Entwistle).

In April 2003, Katy sneaks away to see her friends in Sheffield, but is followed back to Coronation Street by the brothers of the man who was jailed on Angela's evidence.

The brothers proceed to break into Angela and Tommy's house, taking Katy hostage. Armed police show up and Tommy is shot in the showndown. The family's secret was revealed to the neighbours, and Angela is determined not to put her family through any more hiding and secrecy. The Harris's take their own name back, and the residents of the street came round to being more neighbourly again.

Near the end of 2003, Tommy and Angela separate, and Katy starts a relationship with Martin Platt (Sean Wilson) and though disapproving, Angela cannot bear to be estranged from her daughter. The family eventually make up but it was an uneasy peace. Angela has trouble with Craig when he embraces goth subculture with his girlfriend Rosie Webster (Helen Flanagan). In 2004, Angela nearly came to blows with work colleague Kelly Crabtree (Tupele Dorgu) over missing money.

In 2005, Angela discovers that Katy is pregnant, which she is not happy about, but remains supportive. Angela overhears Gail Platt (Helen Worth) talking to Sally Webster (Sally Dynevor), about her affair with Ian Davenport (Philip Bretherton), and assumes that she is talking about Martin. She tells Tommy what she hears and he feels vindicated. They also see Martin and Sally talking and spending time together at Martin and Katy's flat. Other coincidences make Angela and Tommy certain that Martin and Sally are having an affair.

Katy's parents encourage Katy to have an abortion which she does. Angela was mortified to find out from Gail, that Martin really is faithful to Katy and she had the abortion for nothing. Angela and Tommy have a huge argument, and her last words to him are "just drop dead". Shortly after, Katy and Tommy row furiously in the garage, and Katy strikes her father with a wrench, just as Angela walks in. Tommy dies in Angela's arms but she decides to cover up the crime and make it look like a robbery to protect her daughter. The prime suspect according to police is Martin Platt and when he is arrested, it makes Katy feel guilty. Angela has the dilemma of hiding the murder weapon.

Hayley catches Angela in the act of writing a threatening letter to herself on a factory computer. Angela encourages Hayley to post it in a bid to help the family back on the Witness Protection Programme. Hayley's husband Roy (David Neilson) finds out. Angela opens the letter in front of witnesses in order to gain sympathy.

At Tommy's funeral, Angela is supported by Eileen Grimshaw (Sue Cleaver). She admits to the priest Father Thomas (Ian McElhinney) that Katy committed the murder. The police ask Angela to do a television appeal in a bid to find Tommy’s killers and she instantly feels that she is suspected. There are problems when Tommy's mother insists on a burial instead of a cremation. She hides the murder weapon in his coffin. The police continue their questioning, pressuring Angela into making a confession. She confesses to the murder, in order to protect Katy and was remanded in prison. Angela is charged with the murder of Tommy Harris. However Katy, overwhelmed by guilt, plans to commit suicide by destroying her insulin cartridges and drinking water mixed with sugar. Next door the Platt family hear a video tape of Tommy and Angela singing karaoke playing next door in the vacant house. Katy is found by Martin and is taken to hospital, where she dies in hospital. Martin visits Angela in prison, and reads her suicide note titled ‘The Truth’.

At Katy's funeral Angela blames Martin for everything that happened. Even though Katy admitted her guilt in her suicide note, Angela was still guilty of perverting the course of justice and imprisoned for eight years. Her father comes to Weatherfield to stay with Craig in the house. Angela's sentence would've been completed in 2013, but she has never been seen again.

== Reception ==
The murder–suicide storyline was described as controversial. Maureen Lipman called the storyline "ludicrous". Jessica Gibb from the Daily Mirror described it as one of the soap's most sensational and shocking storylines.
