= Martin Platt =

Fictional character from Coronation Street

- Coronation Street character
- Portrayed by: Sean Wilson
- Duration: 1985–2005, 2018
- First appearance: Episode 2486; 28 January 1985
- Last appearance: Episode 9413; 26 March 2018
- Introduced by: Mervyn Watson (1985); Kate Oates (2018)
- Book appearances: Coronation Street: The Complete Saga
In-universe information
- Occupation: Nurse
- Father: Barry Platt
- Mother: Barbara Platt
- Wife: Gail Tilsley (1991–2001); Robyn Platt (2006–present)
- Sons: David Platt
- Daughters: Charlotte Platt
- Adoptive sons: Nick Tilsley
- Adoptive daughters: Sarah Platt
- Grandsons: Billy Platt (adoptive); Max Turner (adoptive); Harry Platt (adoptive); Sam Blakeman (adoptive)
- Granddaughters: Lily Platt; Harper Platt; Bethany Platt (adoptive)

Martin Platt is a fictional character from the British ITV soap opera Coronation Street, portrayed by Sean Wilson. His major storylines were a relationship with Gail Tilsley (Helen Worth) following the death of her husband Brian (Christopher Quinten) and the birth of their child David (Jack P. Shepherd); a feud with Gail's former mother-in-law Ivy Tilsley (Lynne Perrie); the adoption of Brian's children Sarah (Tina O'Brien) and Nick (Ben Price); affairs with Cathy Power (Theresa Brindley) and Rebecca Hopkins (Jill Halfpenny); his relationship with 16-year-old Katy Harris (Lucy-Jo Hudson); and his involvement in the rescue of Gail from her killer husband Richard Hillman (Brian Capron). He left on 9 November 2005. In January 2018, it was confirmed that he would be returning for a short period. He returned on 22 March 2018 and left on 26 March 2018 to go to New Zealand with Robyn and Charlotte.

== Development ==
Actor Sean Wilson was axed from Coronation Street when a major storyline conference decided the character of Martin had been "played out". Wilson later reflected that the producers had "done him a favour by axing his character", and Wilson has since said that if he were to return to the soap, the producers would have to be "very persuasive". He claimed he was dropped from the show, due to his refusal to portray a storyline in which Martin would be jailed for having a relationship with an underage girl.

=== Return (2018) ===
In January 2018, it was announced that Wilson would be reprising the role of Martin for a short period as part of David's male rape storyline.

=== Axed return (2024) ===
On 29 June 2024, it was announced that Wilson would reprise the role of Martin for a short stint to coincide with Gail's exit. It was later announced on 16 August 2024 that Wilson had quit after beginning filming his return for personal reasons, and that scripts were being rewritten to remove Martin's appearance. In November 2024, it was revealed the sudden departure was caused by a historic sex allegation dating back to 1997.

== Storylines ==
=== 1985–2005 ===
Teenager Martin Platt is first seen in 1985 as a school-leaver working in Jim's Café. He had two GCEs and was studying at Salford Technical College. In February 1989, Brian Tilsley (Christopher Quinten) is murdered and Martin begins comforting his widow and former employer at the café, Gail (Helen Worth). They gradually fall for each other and in 1990, Gail finds she is pregnant. Feeling Martin is too young to settle down, she is about to have an abortion when Martin stops her. Their son, David, is born on Christmas Day 1990. Martin helps raise Gail's two older children, Sarah-Louise (Lynsay King) and Nicky (Warren Jackson), from her marriage to Brian. He develops a father-daughter relationship with Sarah but Nicky does not like him and is often keen to remind him that he is not his real father, and for this reason he cannot tell him what to do. Brian's mother, Ivy (Lynne Perrie), is also hostile towards Martin, especially when he decides that he wants to adopt Nicky and Sarah. Supported by Ivy's husband Don Brennan (Geoffrey Hinsliff), the adoption later goes through, despite opposition from Ivy, who even told Social Services that Gail was an unfit mother, but Martin allowed her to visit Nicky and Sarah. When Ivy died in 1995, she presented more trouble for Martin and Gail due to the terms of her will, changes made during the adoption dispute, left her estate and house to Nicky, on the condition by changing his name back to Tilsley with Sarah and Don left nothing. Upon discovering this, Martin is angry because he legally adopted him and wanted to keep him under the Platt surname; however, Gail tells him to accept it because she knew that Ivy wanted Nicky to have Brian's surname knowing that she is to blame for Brian's death.

In the mid-1990s, Martin becomes friendly with fellow nurse, Carmel Finnan (Catherine Cusack). Carmel makes Gail believe she is having an affair with Martin and is pregnant by him, but the problem is solved by Carmel's father, John (Shay Gorman) from Ireland coming to take her home. Martin later sleeps with nurse Cathy Power (Theresa Brindley) on Christmas Day, while working as a student nurse. Martin confesses, and Gail finds it difficult to forgive him, but they are reconciled after Martin passes his nursing exam. In 1998 Martin is suspended from work after Les took an overdose by accident and blamed Martin for this, Les was later found at fault and Martin returned to nursing in early 1999. Martin's 13-year-old adoptive daughter Sarah (now Tina O'Brien) finds out she is pregnant and she cannot have an abortion. Despite him and Gail planning to go to Canada and adopt the baby, Sarah gives birth to Bethany Platt (Amy and Emily Walton). In 1999, Martin becomes friendly with Rebecca Hopkins (Jill Halfpenny), and Gail accuses him of having an affair, but is reassured. Martin and Rebecca subsequently do have an affair, which Martin confesses to Gail only after Rebecca has left him. After an unsuccessful attempt to patch up the marriage, Martin goes to live in a nearby flat and Gail divorces him. Martin remains close to Gail, even after the divorce, and often comes round to have tea with Gail, Sarah, Bethany and David (now played by Jack P. Shepherd).

After his divorce Martin unexpectedly begins a romance with Gail's best friend, Sally Webster (Sally Dynevor). The romance causes controversy due to Gail and Sally's friendship and Martin's friendship with Sally's ex-husband Kevin (Michael Le Vell), but Gail's happiness with new boyfriend Richard Hillman (Brian Capron) leads her to give the new couple her blessing. However, the relationship eventually fizzles out and Sally reunites with Kevin.

When Richard - revealed to have committed a string of murders - tries to kill Gail and the children by driving his car into the canal, Martin and Tommy Harris (Thomas Craig) jump into the canal and swim down to the sunken car and rescue them - although Richard dies. Martin later falls in love with Tommy's sixteen-year-old daughter Katy (Lucy-Jo Hudson). Tommy, who had previously been Martin's friend, is outraged when he finds out about their relationship, and attacks Martin physically, whilst Katy's brother, Craig Harris (Richard Fleeshman), attempts to kill Martin by tampering with the brakes on his car. Katy's parents are even more unhappy when she leaves school to move in with Martin. When Sarah discovers her boyfriend Todd Grimshaw (Bruno Langley) is gay and had been having an affair with Martin's nurse colleague Karl Foster (Chris Finch), she gives birth prematurely to her son Billy Platt who then dies and she and David are angry with Martin when he continues to date Katy, who knew about Todd's sexuality. An angry Martin then attacks Karl at the hospital and is suspended from his job but later reinstated. Katy then falls pregnant with Martin's child. When Sally begins having an affair with colleague Ian Davenport (Philip Bretherton), her previous relationship with Martin, who is working late hours, leads Tommy and his wife Angela Harris (Kathryn Hunt) to believe they are having an affair. They tell Katy, who moves out of Martin's flat and has an abortion. When Gail tells them the truth, Katy is devastated. She confronts Tommy in a rage, and attacks him with a heavy adjustable spanner, killing him. Because of the bad blood between Martin and Tommy, Martin is at first arrested for the murder. Even though Angela only witnesses the murder of Tommy, she confesses to doing it to protect Katy. Martin is released. Katy is hysterical, and as a diabetic, decides to commit suicide by forgoing her insulin injections and eating sugar. Martin, Sarah and Sarah's boyfriend Scooter (Sushil Chudasama) manage to get her to hospital, but she later dies.

Martin decides to move to Liverpool with his new girlfriend Robyn (Clare Calbraith). David is devastated when he hears that Martin is leaving and does not talk to Martin for a while; however, the two of them reconcile just before Martin leaves. Martin and Robyn drive off to Liverpool for their new life together.

=== 2018 ===
After being raped by Josh Tucker (Ryan Clayton), David decides to visit Martin with Max and Lily. It is revealed that Martin and Robyn are expecting their second child together, and are planning to emigrate to New Zealand. Martin realised that David was upset, though came to the conclusion that David was furious with him for leaving for New Zealand, which David says is the truth, too ashamed to open up to his father over being raped. Martin then assured David that he was free to visit him anytime, and this made David think about emigrating over there permanently. As David returned home, he informed his maternal family about his plans to move to New Zealand, much to their surprise, devastation and disappointment.

Martin then arrives back in Weatherfield for the first time in over twelve years, and met David's new girlfriend Shona Ramsey (Julia Goulding). When Josh overheard Martin and Shona discussing David's decision to leave his life-long home, he expressed his concern for David's welfare. After finding out, David told Martin that Josh was no friend of his. Despite Max and Lily telling him that they wanted to remain in Weatherfield, David's mind was made up to emigrate. Martin reassured David that he could come and visit him anytime he wished, but David told Martin that he could not live in the same street where Kylie was murdered, and thus refused to say goodbye to his father. However, as Martin prepared to leave for his new life in New Zealand, David came to see his father off.

== Reception ==
The character has been described as the "only properly functional husband" of Gail, who had been married a total of five times by 2016. In March 2000, Inside Soap ran a poll asking readers if Martin should stay with Gail or leave to be with Rebecca, with 52% of readers voting that Martin should stay with his family and 48% voting that he should leave Gail. The magazine added, "it was a tough call but the majority of you [readers] don't want to see another soap family torn apart and think he should stay and work things out".
