= Roy Cropper =

Fictional character from Coronation Street

- Coronation Street character
- Portrayed by: David Neilson
- Duration: 1995–present
- First appearance: 19 July 1995
- Introduced by: Sue Pritchard
- Spin-off appearances: Coronation Street: Romanian Holiday (2009); Hayley's Diary (2013)
In-universe information
- Other names: Royston Cropper
- Occupation: Café owner Chef
- Father: St. John Cropper
- Mother: Sylvia Goodwin
- Stepmother: Margaret Cropper
- Half-brothers: Richard Lucas; Jonathan Cropper; Stephen Cropper
- Half-sisters: Isabelle Cropper
- Wife: Tracy Barlow (2003–2004); Hayley Cropper (2010–2014)
- Adoptive daughters: Fiz Brown (foster)
- Stepsons: Christian Gatley
- Grandfathers: Royston Cropper
- Uncles: Rod Cropper
- Aunts: Jean
- Nieces: Nina Lucas

Roy Cropper is a fictional character from the British ITV soap opera Coronation Street, played by David Neilson. He first appeared on-screen on 19 July 1995. Originally a secondary character, he was given a more prominent role in 1997, by the executive producer of Coronation Street, Brian Park. Roy has been featured in numerous high-profile storylines, most notably marrying the first transgender character in a British soap opera, Hayley Cropper (Julie Hesmondhalgh).

== Creation ==
=== Background ===
The character, played by David Neilson, is introduced in July 1995 as "a rather odd and scary loner" living in a block of flats near the long-running character Deirdre Barlow (Anne Kirkbride). Actor David Neilson got the part on the recommendation of Coronation Street writer Stephen Mallatratt, a close friend of Neilson's who helped to "mould the character". According to Neilson, the character was initially only brought in for six episodes, but the role was extended and Roy was made into a regular character.

Described primarily as an "incidental character", Roy is not given any significant storylines until 1997. Behind the scenes, the soap was going through a period of change. Coronation Street was lagging behind the BBC's rival soap opera EastEnders in the ratings, so a new executive producer, Brian Park, was brought in to revitalise the show and attract younger viewers. Aside from multiple axings and introducing various dramatic storylines, Park also decided to give some of the less prominent existing characters a much higher profile; among them was Roy, who was brought to the forefront of the soap throughout 1997 and 1998, taking over a share in Gail Platt's (Helen Worth) café (changing its name to Roy's Rolls). This gave the character more screen time and, gradually, he was incorporated into the lives of other characters.

=== Personality ===
Originally, Roy was intended as a psychopathic, villainous character whose tenure would last for only six episodes. Neilson described the character as "scary", and "a bit like Norman Bates in [the horror film] Psycho". However, Neilson felt compelled to reinvent Roy as a sympathetic character, socially inept, rather than menacing. His pestering of neighbour Deirdre and his unusual behaviour could be explained by Asperger syndrome—a disorder which Neilson has since attempted to portray in the character. This ultimately extended the character's screen life, turning him into a fan favourite. Misunderstood, he was almost evicted from his flats for his behaviour towards Deirdre, though he was actually only showing concern for her welfare. He was summed up by the character Mike Baldwin as "a bit of a nutter, but harmless enough". Although it has never been officially confirmed on-screen, it has indeed been suggested by critics that Roy has Asperger syndrome, due to his obsessive compulsive tendencies and because of his misunderstanding and literal interpretations of nuances and subtleties.

Described as "remarkably intelligent, but socially naïve", Roy Cropper is a pure atheist. He is a fan of buses and trains, wears a beige anorak, scarf, woollen gloves and clutches a nylon shopping bag with a set of keys taped to the handle. Actor David Neilson has since revealed that his character's "infamous old shopping bag", complete with attached keys, were props that he introduced. The bag and keys belonged to Neilson's mother, who died shortly before he took on the role in 1995. He has commented, "My mum sadly passed away just before I started on the show and I wanted to carry something of hers. I also wanted to add my own props and develop the character. The bag carries nothing more than my script."

Despite Roy's initial "creepy" persona, viewers were eventually shown a different side to the character. He was converted from a creep to an eccentric; a quiet and shy intellectual man, with few social skills and a penchant for trivial information, but underneath it all, a man with "a heart of gold". He has been described as compassionate, moral, sensitive and full of integrity; taking in waifs and strays and helping his neighbours whenever possible. Commenting on his character, Neilson has said, "Roy is absolutely his own person and hugely honourable. Some people think he's simple. He's not. He's a very complex man with hidden depths. And there's lots more to explore...There's something tragic about Roy. I think there is a big black cloud that follows him around and one day it is going to really dump on him."

== Development ==
=== Hayley Cropper ===
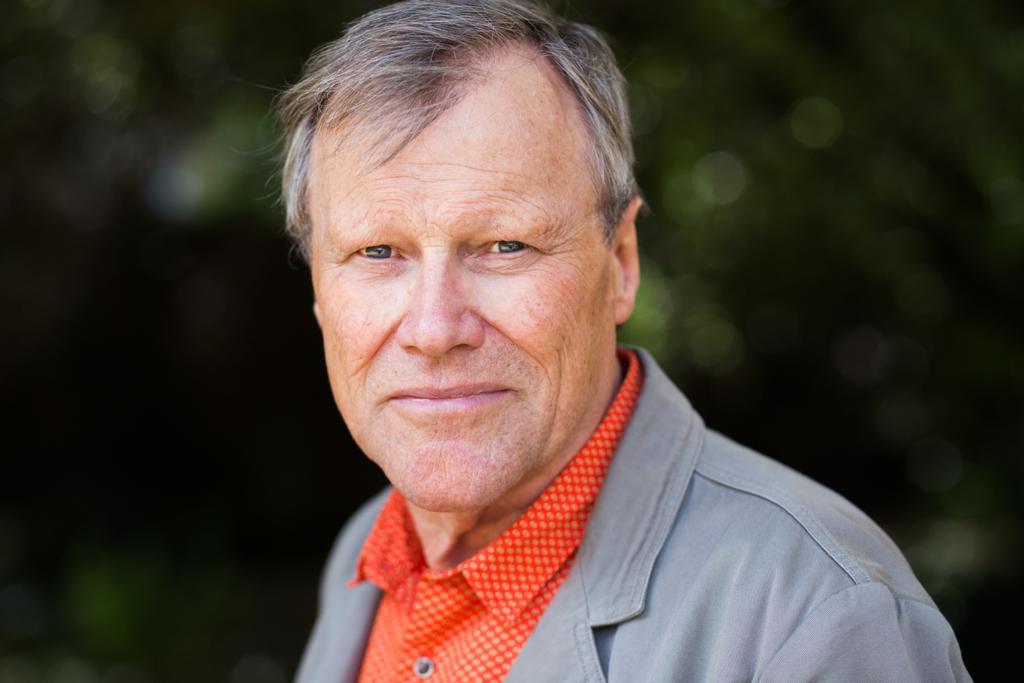
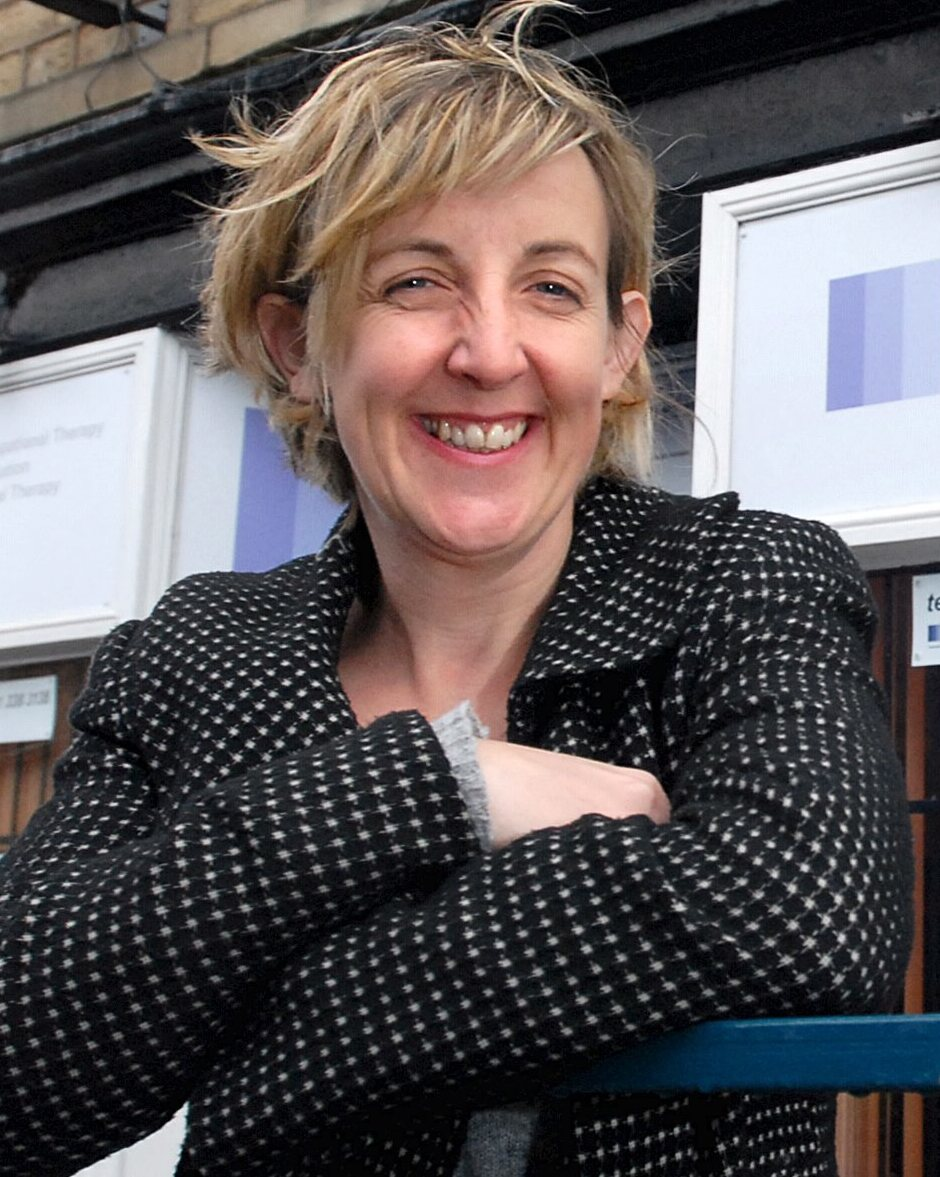
David Neilson (top) and Julie Hesmondhalgh (bottom) play Roy and his wife, Hayley Cropper. Hayley was brought in as a love interest for Roy, but also as representation for transgender people.

As the character becomes more prominent, producers decided to introduce a romantic interest for Roy. Hayley Patterson is introduced in 1998, and her relationship with Roy turns out to be one of the more controversial storylines in Coronation Street's history, as it is later revealed that Hayley is a transgender woman. In an article published by "Press for Change" (a political lobbying and educational organisation, which campaigns to achieve equal civil rights and liberties for all trans people in the UK), an advisor who helped studio writers at Granada Television with this storyline has given an account on its conceptualisation: "It was decided that Roy needed a girlfriend, but what kind of woman would go for Roy, or vice-versa? Ideally, she would have to be a female mirror image of himself. So the character started development and Hayley Patterson...was created. But then someone suggested something; what if she had a dark secret? What if she was transsexual!? Hayley being Harry, in her past life. After some argument and hard thinking, the idea stuck. It was a very controversial move for the long-running show... 'Corrie' had never gone this far."

Hayley's initial purpose was to boost ratings and to act as a "foil" for Roy, "to bring him out of himself a bit and show another side to the man". There were initial criticisms about the storyline and the character of Hayley from the transgender community in the UK, mainly because the actress who played Hayley was not transgender. However, as the storyline progressed, viewers and critics warmed to Roy and Hayley's romance. Hayley was finally shown to relay her secret to Roy during a candlelit meal in his cafe. Horrified, Roy rejected her, but after a period of reflection he eventually came around, resolving to remain friends with Hayley until she left for Amsterdam to undergo gender reassignment surgery. Although the character of Hayley was only meant to be short-term, she and her relationship with Roy were so well received by viewers, that the producers of Coronation Street decide to reintroduce her. On-screen, Roy tracks down Hayley and they reunite in a special set of episodes, shot on location in Amsterdam in the Netherlands; Hayley is persuaded to return to Weatherfield with Roy and rebuild their relationship. Actor David Neilson has complimented the storyline, describing the writing as "absolutely beautiful", and Roy and Hayley are now considered to be one of Coronation Street's "classic" couples.

=== Temporary departure ===
On 12 November 2015, it was reported by the Sun newspaper that Neilson would be taking a three-month break as he wanted to join a stage show and tread the boards, while the break would also allow him to "recharge". The newspaper added that ITV said it was "happy to accommodate" his leave, and he will be written out of the show. Roy departed on 22 January 2016 as he headed to Hastings to care for his mother, Sylvia, who had broken her hip. He returned to the show on 9 May 2016.

== Storylines ==
In 1995, Deirdre Rachid (Anne Kirkbride) moves into a new flat and meets fellow tenant Roy Cropper, who seems overhelpful. Jamie Armstrong catches Roy reading a postcard Tracy Barlow (Dawn Acton) sent to Deirdre and calls him pathetic, thinking that Roy is stalking Deirdre. The tank bursts in 5 Crimea Street, making the Armstrongs and Roy panic, but Deirdre is unnerved by the way Roy takes advantage of the leak to try to get close to her. She is stunned when he tells her that he's sorry about her bereavement and tells Mike Baldwin (Johnny Briggs) of her discomfort. Roy pesters Deirdre late at night, inviting her for a drink. Mike tells Roy to leave Deirdre alone and he makes plans to move out. Tricia Armstrong (Tracy Brabin) overhears Roy apologising to Mike for stepping in on his lady-friend. Roy asks Tricia if she's the same as Deirdre, one of Mike's women, and she tells him to get lost. Roy worries that Deirdre is brooding too much and fears that she may have a breakdown but he just annoys her as she sees Roy's concern as him pestering her. Roy alerts Mike to the fact that Deirdre is shutting herself away.

Bill Webster (Peter Armitage) and Jim McDonald (Charles Lawson) find a cast-iron fireplace while renovating the flats and decide to sell it, but Jamie tells Roy they are stealing it and tries to blackmail them for £5. Roy gets a new job washing-up in a big hotel. To help Tricia out, he buys her TV for £30. Martin Platt (Sean Wilson) takes Roy on to help out in the cafe. Roy is interested to hear that Don Brennan (Geoffrey Hinsliff) has a ghost and offers the benefit of his experience, lending Vera Duckworth (Liz Dawn) books on ghosts and haunted houses. Vera and her husband Jack (Bill Tarmey) are alarmed to find Roy camping in their cellar at night searching for any signs of a ghost. He hasn't found anything.

Liz McDonald (Beverley Callard) turns to Deirdre for help after Jim beats her up, with Roy paying her taxi fare for her. Roy gives Liz flowers and advises her to report Jim to the police for assault. Roy takes charge as the menfolk – Jack, Bill, Martin, Fred Elliott (John Savident), Alf Roberts (Bryan Mosley), Gary Mallett (Ian Mercer) and Billy Williams (Frank Mills) – set off to the races. Roy refuses to drink with the others and spends his time working out a formula to win on the horses. He fancies betting on "Betty's Hot Shot". The others join him as they like the name. "Betty's Hot Shot" wins at 50–1, giving the men £250 each. Jack suggests they invest their winnings by buying the horse as it's a selling handicap. The trainer, Hilary Forrest (Julia Goodman), tells them the horse has tons of potential. Roy pulls out of buying the horse, but the others go for it. Jack bids on their behalf, unsure about what he's doing. The men buy the horse for £2,600 guineas, costing their winnings plus £90 each. Hilary agrees to keep training him. The men are horrified when Roy tells them it costs £10,000 a year to keep a racehorse.

Roy volunteers to help out at the café so Gail Platt (Helen Worth) can have a week off with her family. Alma Baldwin (Amanda Barrie) is impressed by Roy's ideas on catering and his no-smoking policy at the café. Jamie has no money for lunch so offers postage stamps instead at the café. Roy realises he is hungry and plays along, hiring his baseball cap for four hours at £1 an hour in exchange for food. Jamie thinks that he's mad. Gary starts to dig the foundations for the conservatory, scaling it all down so it will fit in the yard. He worries when Roy asks him about his anti-damp preparations and tells him that he won't get any sun as the yard is north-facing.

Gail cannot cope with working and with Alma away, she gets Roy and Audrey Roberts (Sue Nicholls) to run the café. Roy considers starting a syndicate for the lottery which doesn't involve buying tickets as he feels the odds are against winning. He feels that there's too much gambling in the world. Gail finds it hard to concentrate at work and is surprised to discover that Roy knows how she feels as he explains how his father disappeared one day. He urges her to think positively.

Roy purchases Alma's share of Jim's Café and goes into business with Gail, renaming the café Roy's Rolls. Roy meets Hayley Patterson (Julie Hesmondhalgh), with whom he instantly finds a rapport. Like himself, she is shy and naive; they find they have a lot in common and begin dating but during an intimate dinner, Hayley reveals that she is a transgender woman who has not yet undergone gender reassignment surgery. Roy reacts badly, rejecting Hayley and becoming depressed until Alma makes Roy realise that he has been hasty. When Hayley leaves to have gender reassignment surgery in Amsterdam, Roy misses her and goes to Amsterdam to meet her and bring her back. Hayley buys Gail's share in the café and she moves in with Roy. He proposes to Hayley on Valentine's Day 1999, but she initially declines due to the fact that the law does not recognise her gender as legitimate and thus misclassifies her relationship with Roy as same-sex, with same-sex marriage not yet legal in the UK. More problems arise when Hayley's secret becomes public knowledge. Roy is embarrassed but, following various arguments, he pledges to stand by Hayley and proposes again. This time she accepts, but when they go to see a vicar, he refuses to marry them. However, Roy meets Jessica Lundy (Olwen May), a curate who agrees to perform a blessing ceremony for him and Hayley but the church ceremony is ruined by Les Battersby (Bruce Jones). Roy and Hayley return to the café and have the blessing there instead and Hayley gets her surname changed by deed poll to Cropper.

Knowing they cannot have children of their own, Roy and Hayley become temporary foster carers, taking in troublesome sixteen-year-old Fiz Brown (Jennie McAlpine), who causes them various problems. They also look after Wayne Hayes (Gary Damer) and form a close relationship. He visits them repeatedly and even his mother comes to visit on one occasion, worried about the influence Roy and Hayley have over Wayne. Wayne's stepfather, however, takes advantage of their feelings for Wayne and allow them to take custody of Wayne as long as they pay him for the privilege. However, eventually Roy and Hayley decide to stand up to Wayne's stepfather and refuse to give him back and even go on the run with Wayne briefly but Wayne's mother calls the police and reports them for kidnapping her son and they are caught and arrested. The charges are dropped when Wayne's domestic situation is exposed.

For a bet with Bev Unwin (Susie Blake), Tracy (now played by Kate Ford) spikes Roy's drink at a wedding reception. She then takes him home and puts him in her bed. Tracy later announces she is pregnant with his child. Hayley is devastated and after she leaves Roy, he contemplates suicide. Hayley returns and the Croppers agree to buy Tracy's baby and wanting to make sure they have parental rights to the baby, Roy marries Tracy. Tracy gives birth to a daughter and she gives custody to the Croppers, who register her birth and name her Patience but Tracy reveals, on Steve (Simon Gregson) and Karen McDonald's (Suranne Jones) wedding day, that she wants her daughter back and that Steve is Patience's father, not Roy as they never actually slept together. Initially they refuse to give Patience back to Tracy, but are persuaded by Ken Barlow (William Roache); Tracy's adoptive father. Roy is devastated and he and Hayley reluctantly return the baby and Tracy renames her Amy (Elle Mulvaney). Roy and Tracy's marriage is subsequently annulled and feeling guilty, she repays the money that the Croppers gave her and asks them to be Amy's godparents.

Roy is bullied by builder Vince (Conrad Nelson) and his arrival brings up many unpleasant memories for Roy, as he recounts to Hayley the physical and psychological torture that he suffered in his youth. When he is alone in the cafe, Vince comes in and demands a free meal. When Roy gives in and brings him a fry-up, he says he asked for a poached egg, not a fried one. He then pushes the egg onto the floor and Roy attempts to get past him, but Vince shoves him onto the floor, knocking him against a table in the process. He is only stopped by Vince's boss Charlie Stubbs (Bill Ward), who promptly fires Vince for bullying Roy. Thereafter, Charlie orders Vince not to return to the street, before taking him outside and punching him to the ground. Roy soon mentors Fiz's younger brother Chesney Brown (Sam Aston) and he sells his comic collection to buy a Morris Traveller.

Roy is furious when he learns that Hayley has a son and their marriage nearly ends. However, with support from his co-worker Becky Granger (Katherine Kelly), Roy makes peace with Hayley and supports her when she decides to take a year out to do charity work in Mozambique. Roy allows Becky to move in while Hayley is away, but he throws her out when he learns about her affair with Steve. They later make up and Roy gives her away at her wedding.

Roy finds Tony Gordon (Gray O'Brien) lying outside Underworld after he has suffered a heart attack. Roy calls an ambulance and Tony is rushed to hospital. Roy is shocked when Tony confesses to having Liam Connor (Rob James-Collier) murdered. Tony recovers and Roy fails to persuade him to confess the truth. Tony threatens to kill Roy and Hayley and they report him to the police, resulting in Tony's arrest. The police let him go due to a lack of evidence and Tony tries to murder Roy with a knife by trying to sneak up on him when he was bat-watching by the river, but Tony's mobile phone rings, alerting Roy, and ends up pushing Roy into the canal. On seeing Roy struggling, as he cannot swim, Tony rescues him and later hands himself in to the police, while Roy is found by Hayley and Becky.

Roy proposes to Hayley again, but tensions over the wedding cause Hayley to move in with Anna Windass (Debbie Rush). A few weeks later, Tony breaks out of prison with the help of Robbie Sloane, a former cellmate and plans to hold Hayley and Carla Connor (Alison King) hostage at Underworld. Robbie poses as a businessman and lures Carla into the factory alone before holding her at gunpoint, and leaving her tied to her office chair with her mouth taped shut. He then tells Hayley that Carla has had an accident to get her into the factory. Hayley sees Carla bound and gagged but Robbie holds her at gunpoint too before she can escape. Tony then arrives. Tony rips the tape off Carla's mouth and announces his plans to murder them. After hearing what has happened, Roy heads to the factory and begs for Hayley's life. After Carla pleads with Tony, Hayley is later released and she is then reunited with Roy, just as the factory is blown up; although Carla manages to escape but Tony kills himself by walking back into the burning factory. On the day of their wedding, Hayley is late due to some interference by scorned wedding planner Mary Taylor (Patti Clare). She eventually makes it to the ceremony and she and Roy are married. Roy receives a letter from his estranged mother, Sylvia Goodwin (Stephanie Cole), telling him that his stepfather has died. A few days later, Sylvia turns up in Weatherfield to give Roy a train set. Hayley asks Roy to let Sylvia move in with them and she begins working with Roy in the café. Sylvia asks why she has not yet had grandchildren, and Hayley initially passes her infertility off as menopause. She is livid to discover that Hayley is transgender, but after getting to know Hayley, she learns to accept her for who she is.

Everything goes swimmingly for the Croppers, but in 2013, Roy tries to find his estranged father online, but learns that his father, St. John, has died just months earlier. He struggles to come to terms with his father's death, and begins sleepwalking. Hayley agrees to go through medical tests with Roy for support, but her own test results detect abnormal liver function, and is then diagnosed with stage-two pancreatic cancer. While the pair are on holiday to take Hayley's mind off things, Sylvia leaves a note explaining that she has left Weatherfield but does not give a specific reason. A while after, Roy and Hayley are dealt with the news that her cancer is terminal. Hayley then reveals that she wants to die before the cancer reverts her back to her old self, but Roy struggles to accept her decision. Arguments ensue regularly over her decision, and this leads to Hayley leaving Roy temporarily. While she is living with Fiz and her boyfriend Tyrone Dobbs (Alan Halsall), Hayley collapses and is told she has an infection. In December, the couple are told that she has weeks left to live, much to their devastation. Hayley tells Roy to only break the news to a selected few, including Anna, Carla, Peter Barlow (Chris Gascoyne), Fiz, Tyrone, Rita Tanner (Barbara Knox) and Dennis Tanner (Philip Lowrie).

In January 2014, Hayley decides it's time to end her life and after a final visit from Fiz and Tyrone, Hayley makes herself a lethal drug cocktail. Roy lies on the bed with Hayley as she drinks the cocktail, which kills her. Carla and Anna are worried about what is happening in the Croppers' flat and decide to investigate, where they find a dead Hayley on the bed with Roy's arm around her. Anna and Carla soon guess that Hayley committed suicide. Roy struggles to come to terms with Hayley's death, and is dealt with more stress when Fiz discovers that Hayley killed herself. She is furious and shouts at Roy before storming off. Roy is then angry with Hayley for ending her life and leaving him behind. After Hayley's funeral, Roy leaves a note for Anna and Fiz explaining that he has left Weatherfield to visit Sylvia and aunt Jean. This relieves Fiz and Anna, but they are unaware that Roy has not gone to visit Sylvia and was last seen wandering the city streets.

When a pipe bursts at the café, Anna and Fiz are worried about Roy's whereabouts. Fiz calls Roy's aunt Jean, who reveals that she has not seen Roy in six months and that Sylvia is on holiday in Tenerife. Anna then calls the police and Fiz nearly tells them that Roy is not coping after Hayley committed suicide, but she thinks about the consequences and does not. When Roy's favourite shopping bag is found in a canal, Fiz and Tyrone frantically search Manchester armed with a photograph of Roy. When they eventually get home, Fiz reveals her worries to Tyrone and tells him that she thinks that Roy is dead. Roy returns in mid-February 2014, after being seen by Steve and Tracy at a railway museum. It is revealed that Roy has visited the museum every day since he disappeared from Weatherfield to take his mind off Hayley's death. Roy is not seen for a while following his return to Weatherfield, and it is later revealed that he has been obsessively building a model railway in his living room. This shocks Fiz but fascinates Tyrone and Chesney.

In April 2015, Roy meets a widow called Cathy Matthews (Melanie Hill) at the allotment who tells him that her husband Alan has died and Roy reveals his own struggle with grief when Hayley died. Roy gets on well with Cathy and decide to meet up to go to places such as the art gallery. Carla thinks against this and takes it as disrespect to his late wife Hayley. In July 2015, Roy visits Cathy at her house and is shocked to discover that she keeps all her rubbish piled up in the living room. Roy thinks that she needs support but Cathy is against the idea and will not take no for an answer. Roy prepares to go to Deirdre's 60th birthday party after spending the day with Cathy when Carla tells him the terrible news that Deirdre died, Roy reflects on the first time he met Deirdre and feels upset that she has died, Cathy comforts him. Cathy and Roy soon start a relationship and later get engaged, although he later called off the engagement as he found it difficult to move on from Hayley. Despite this, Roy and Cathy remained friends and he was fine with her dating Brian Packham. Roy left for South America in November 2021 but returned to Weatherfield on Christmas Day, having realised that he belonged there.

In 2024, Roy is arrested and charged with the murder of Lauren Bolton (Cait Fitton) but is later released.

== Reception ==
For his portrayal of Roy, Neilson won "Best Actor" at the 2013 Inside Soap Awards. He was longlisted for the same award in 2024. Neilson won "Best Actor", "Best Dramatic Performance", "Best Storyline" (alongside Julie Hesmondhalgh), "Best Single Episode" (alongside Julie Hesmondhalgh) and "Best On-Screen partnership" (alongside Julie Hesmondhalgh) at The British Soap Awards 2014. Alex Ross from Planet Radio wrote that Neilson was recognisable in the role and that Roy is a popular character. In 2020, when speaking about Roy having been on the soap for 25 years, Gary Gillatt from Inside Soap wrote "Hurrah! Now another 25, please".
