= Pauline Fleming =

English actress

Pauline Fleming (born 1960) is an English actress.

Born in 1960 in the Sefton Park area of Liverpool, Lancashire, Fleming trained at the Elliot Clarke School of Dance and Drama. Since leaving drama school her theatre appearances include Alan Ayckbourn’s Chorus of Disapproval for Theatr Clwyd. She played both Maria and Antonio in Kaboodles Production of Twelfth Night, which opened at the Liverpool Everyman then did an international tour. Pauline also spent many years touring Children's Theatre productions performing the UK, Ireland and Europe. She went on to read English at Liverpool University. Her motivation was a fear of Shakespeare, which she finally overcame: she now regularly co-tutors on many workshops for Liverpool University.

Fleming's TV credits include Heartbeat, Doctors and BBC’s Nice Guy Eddie, alongside Ricky Tomlinson. However, she is best known for her roles as Val Walker in Channel 4's Mersey soap opera Brookside (1996), and Penny King in ITV's longest-running soap opera Coronation Street (2003–2006). She completed a run in 'The Vagina Monologues' and went on tour playing Sarah in ‘The Naked Truth’. Fleming lives in Liverpool with her two cats, two dogs and daughter Cornelia. She also does much work for charity, particularly Pets As Therapy and recently lent her support and attended the re-launch of Birkenhead Royal British Legion branch, the first British Legion branch in the world. In 2013, she played Margie in the BBC comedy-drama Being Eileen.
