= Jack Kirkbride =

English cartoonist

- Born: 31 March 1923; Oldham, England
- Died: 1 October 2006 (aged 83); Oldham, England
- Occupation: Cartoonist
- Employer: Oldham Evening Chronicle
- Spouse: Enid Kirkbride (died 1993)
- Children: 2, including Anne

Jack Kirkbride (31 March 1923 – 1 October 2006) was an English cartoonist, and father to Anne Kirkbride, the actress who played Deirdre Barlow in the ITV soap opera Coronation Street from 1972 to 2014.

Kirkbride left school at the age of fourteen to become an apprentice painter and decorator but was called up for the Army at age eighteen, when he began to draw cartoons. He served from 1942 as a transport driver with the Royal Army Service Corps. He fought in the Normandy Campaign in 1944 and was demobbed in 1946. He sold his first cartoon to a national paper in 1953 (a Mothers' Day gag for the Sunday Dispatch) and later sold to most national papers and magazines, including Punch and The Oldie. His work also appeared in the German press under the name of Jacki.

He became the Oldham Evening Chronicle's regular cartoonist in 1958 and went full-time in the 1970s.

He was a founder member of the Cartoonists' Club of Great Britain and his work was published across Europe.

Kirkbride won first prize at the Waddington's International Cartoon Festival (Margate 1989). His hobbies included listening to classical music, renovating his 18th century farmhouse on the edge of Saddleworth Moor and playing the pianola.

He died of an aneurysm at his home in Oldham, at the age of 83.
