= Scott Taylor (actor) =

English actor

Scott Anthony Taylor (born 6 October 1982) is an English actor.

== Acting career ==
Taylor's acting career started with a role in the 2000 Christmas special of ITV1's Heartbeat of which The Royal is a spin-off. He played Noel Stringer, the bank manager's son, who was kidnapped.

An appearance in three episodes of Coronation Street followed where he played university student Stuart Fergus, a school friend of Todd Grimshaw, who encouraged Todd to become a student.

Taylor soon moved to Birmingham to play Tom Bradley, a paranoid schizophrenic, in the BBC daytime soap opera Doctors.

Prior to his present role Taylor played Harchester United midfielder Danny Rawsthorne, for two series, in the Sky One drama Dream Team. He appeared as the ambulance driver Frankie Robinson in the ITV1 drama series The Royal.

Scott has also recently played a role of Peter Sutherland on Waterloo Road.

He starred in hit BBC Three sketch show Scallywagga.

In January 2011 Scott joined the cast of Emmerdale as Joe Chappell.
