= Thomas Craig (actor) =

British actor

- Born: Craig Thompson; 4 December 1962 (age 63); Sheffield, West Riding of Yorkshire, England
- Occupation: Actor
- Years active: 1986–present
- Known for: Coronation Street (2002–2005); Murdoch Mysteries (2008–present)
- Partner: Siobhan McKay
- Children: 2

Thomas Craig (born Craig Thompson; 4 December 1962) is an English actor. He is known for his roles in Murdoch Mysteries, Where the Heart Is, Hidden, Coronation Street, and The Navigators.

== Biography ==
Craig was originally a plumber before making the move into acting in the 1980s. He attended the Academy of Live and Recorded Arts. His stage name is taken from the name of former Sheffield Wednesday player Tommy Craig.

In 1994 he appeared sporadically in the first series of Common As Muck, alongside Edward Woodward and Neil Dudgeon and he also had a brief role in the 1995 film I.D., where he played one of the Tyneburn leaders during the market fight scene, his only word then was "Well!" when asking for a fight.

Craig appeared in EastEnders in 1992 as Mandy Salter's mother's boyfriend. Around 1994 he appeared as Aelfric in "Monk's Hood", an episode of the Cadfael television series starring Sir Derek Jacobi. He currently stars as Inspector Brackenreid (Chief Constable from season 18) in the Canadian show Murdoch Mysteries.

== Filmography ==
=== Film ===
| Year | Title | Role | Notes |
|---|---|---|---|
| 1990 | Shooting Stars | Paul Reid | |
| 1992 | Hostage | 2nd Undertaker | |
| 1992 | This Boy's Story | Tony (at 27) | |
| 1995 | I.D. | Tyneburn Leader | |
| 1996 | The Organized Manager, Part One: Damnation | (unknown) | Short film |
| 2001 | The Navigators | Mick | |
| 2007 | Six Bend Trap | Debt Enforcer | |
| 2009 | The Tournament | (unknown) | Uncredited role |
| 2014 | A Gun | Roland | Short film |
| 2014 | Hyena | Harrison | |

=== Television ===
| Year | Title | Role | Notes |
|---|---|---|---|
| 1989 | Traffik | (unknown) | Miniseries; episode: "The Courier" |
| 1989 | The Paradise Club | D.C. Lambton | Main role. 8 episodes |
| 1990 | ScreenPlay | Robson | Episode: "Night Voice" |
| 1991 | El C.I.D. | Gangster | Episode: "Piece of Cake" |
| 1991 | The Bill | Instructor | Episode: "Shots" |
| 1991 | The Chief | Det. Sgt. Bradley | Episode: "2.1" |
| 1991 | Smack and Thistle | Spikey | Television film |
| 1992 | A Time to Dance | Allan | Miniseries; episode 3 |
| 1992 | Inspector Morse | Desk Sergeant | Episode: "Dead on Time" |
| 1992 | Casualty | Nick | Episode: "Act of Faith" |
| 1992 | Between the Lines | P.C. Wilks | Episode: "Words of Advice" |
| 1992 | Screen One | Myles | Episode: "Born Kicking" |
| 1992 | Screen One | Don Summers | Episode: "Seconds Out" |
| 1992 | Boon | Barry Winder | Episode: "Is There Anybody There?" |
| 1992 | EastEnders | Gary | Guest role. 1 episode |
| 1993 | Spender | Jim Harris | Episode: "Puck" |
| 1993 | Peak Practice | Paul | Episode: "Giddy Heights" |
| 1994 | Pie in the Sky | D.S. Maltby | Episode: "The Best of Both Worlds" |
| 1994 | Cadfael | Aelfric | Episode: "Monk's Hood" |
| 1994 | Common As Muck | Philip Edwards | Episodes: "The Nose Out of Joint", "Keeping the Refuse Tender", "Cash Bonus" |
| 1994 | The Bill | Sgt. Northfield | Episode: "Killing Time" |
| 1994–1995 | Casualty | Graham Evans | Episodes: "A Breed Apart", "Learning Curve", "Trials and Tribulations" |
| 1995 | Prime Suspect | D.S. Booth | Episodes: "Inner Circles", "The Scent of Darkness" |
| 1996 | Madson | Gordon Berry | 6 episodes |
| 1996 | The Bill | P.C. Penrose | Episode: "Final Drive" |
| 1996 | Out of the Blue | Terry Forrest | Episode: "Safety Box" |
| 1996 | The Demon Headmaster | Policeman | Episodes: "2.2", "2.3", "2.4". Uncredited role |
| 1997 | The Bill | Mark Scott | Episode: "Walkabout" |
| 1997 | Soldier Soldier | Fusilier Jacko Barton | Main role. Series 7; 12 episodes |
| 1997–2005 | Where the Heart Is | Simon Goddard | Main role. Series 1–6 & 9; 68 episodes |
| 1999 | Dangerfield | Bryn Edmunds | Episode: "Chasing Shadows" |
| 2002–2005 | Coronation Street | Tommy Nelson / Tommy Harris | Regular role; 129 episodes |
| 2005 | Coronation Street: Pantomime | Tommy Nelson / Tommy Harris | Television film |
| 2006 | Holby City | Ian Keel | Episode: "Just Another Day" |
| 2006 | Doctors | Ian Reed | Episode: "Nobody's Perfect" |
| 2007 | Heartbeat | Ken Hutchinson | Episode: "Troubled Waters" |
| 2007 | Forgiven | Matt | Television film |
| 2007 | Blue Murder | Chris Milligan | Episode: "Not a Matter of Life and Death" |
| 2008–present | Murdoch Mysteries | Insp./ Ch. Con. Thomas Brackenreid | Main role. Seasons 1–19; 327 episodes |
| 2009 | Casualty | Steve | Episode: "Better Drowned" |
| 2009 | U Be Dead | D.C. Lee Rutter | Television film |
| 2010 | Doctors | Sgt. Dean Frater | Episode: "An Officer and a Gentle Man" |
| 2011 | The Listener | Jake Coogan | Episode: "Ace in the Hole" |
| 2011 | Murdoch Mysteries: The Curse of the Lost Pharaohs | Inspector Thomas Brackenreid | Web series. Main role |
| 2011 | Hidden | D.I. Fenton Russell | Miniseries; 4 episodes |
| 2012 | Murdoch Mysteries: The Murdoch Effect | Inspector Thomas Brackenreid | Web series. Main role |
| 2013 | Captain Canuck | Professor Walker (voice) | Episode: "Out Foxed" |
| 2017 | Elvis Jones | Tom Parker | Episode: "Suspicious Minds" |
| 2017 | The Kennedys: After Camelot | Police Chief Dominic Arena | Also known as: The Kennedys: Decline and Fall. Miniseries; episode 2 |
| 2017 | Alias Grace | Farm Dealer | Episode: "Part 3" |
| 2017 | Frankie Drake Mysteries: A Cold Case | Thomas Brackenreid | Season 1; unknown episodes |
| 2022 | Hudson & Rex | Henry Ward | Episode: "No Man is an Island" |
| 2022 | Departure | McCaully | Season 3; 6 episodes |
| 2026 | The Borderline | Gaz | Also known as: The Murder Line. Miniseries; 6 episodes |

=== Video games ===
| Year | Title | Role (voice) | Notes |
|---|---|---|---|
| 1996 | Privateer 2: The Darkening | Man #2 / Kronos's Ship | |
