= Lucy-Jo Hudson =

English actress (born 1983)

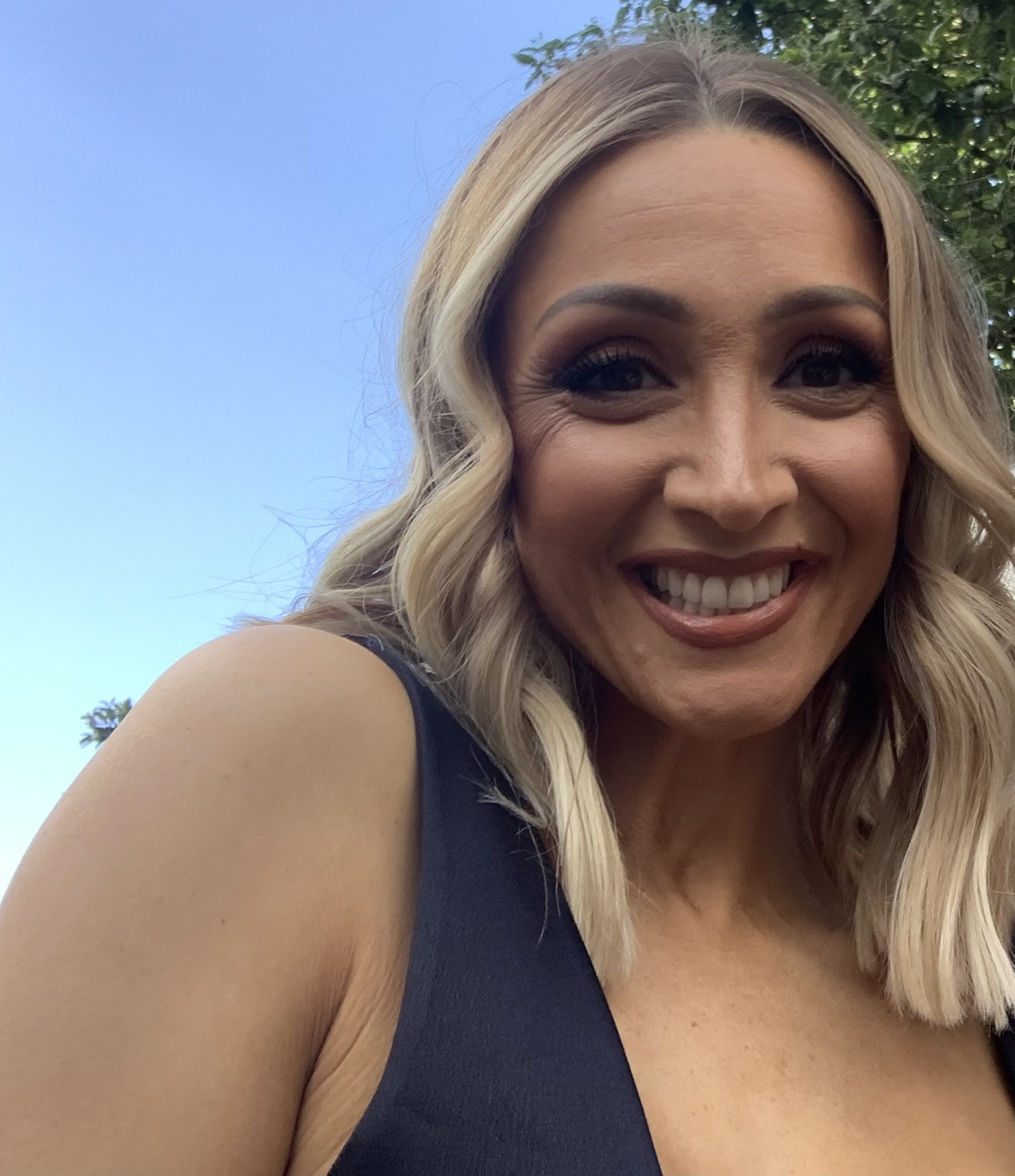
- Hudson in 2022
- Born: 4 May 1983 (age 43); Leeds, West Yorkshire, England
- Occupation: Actress
- Years active: 2002–present
- Television: Coronation Street; Wild at Heart; Doctors; Dance Dance Dance; Hollyoaks
- Spouse: Alan Halsall (m. 2009; div. 2018)
- Children: 2
- Relatives: Ryan Hudson (brother)

Lucy-Jo Hudson (born 4 May 1983) is an English actress, known for her roles as Katy Harris in Coronation Street, Rosie Trevanion in Wild at Heart and Donna-Marie Quinn in Hollyoaks. Her role as Rhiannon Davis in Doctors earned her the British Soap Award for Villain of the Year in 2017.

== Early and personal life ==
Hudson was born on 4 May 1983 in Leeds, West Yorkshire. She is the sister of rugby league player Ryan Hudson, as well as dance coach Amy-Lou. She attended the Scala School of Performing Arts in Leeds.

Hudson was married to Coronation Street actor Alan Halsall who plays the role of Tyrone Dobbs. On 7 September 2013, Hudson gave birth to their daughter, Sienna Rae. The couple announced they were splitting up in March 2016, however they rekindled their relationship several weeks later for a short time before in 2018 Hudson announced that she and Halsall were in the process of divorcing.

== Career ==
Before landing her role in Coronation Street, Hudson worked as a professional dancer and theatre actress. She was also a regular panellist on the ITV talk show Loose Women during 2005. She later landed a role in the ITV drama Wild at Heart. In 2016, she portrayed the role of Rhiannon Davis in the BBC soap opera Doctors. Hudson stated that despite appearing on Doctors for a short amount of time, she felt like "part of the furniture", and that her co-stars and the production team were "lovely". After scenes depicting Rhiannon having a breakdown and her eventual arrest were aired, numerous viewers voiced via social media that Hudson and Doctors itself "deserve awards" for the "emotional" storyline. A year later, for her portrayal of Rhiannon, Hudson won the award for Villain of the Year at the 2017 British Soap Awards. After winning the award, she stated that she was shocked to be nominated in the villain category, as Rhiannon is not "your stereotypical villain at all", and is rather a "depressive character". On 5 May 2018, it was announced that she had been cast in the Channel 4 soap opera Hollyoaks. She made her debut appearance as Donna-Marie Quinn later that year and initially departed from the role in April 2019. She returned briefly in January 2020, before returning again in June 2021.

== Filmography ==
Year	Title	Role	Notes
2002–2005	Coronation Street	Katy Harris	Regular role
2005	Loose Women	Herself - Panellist	8 episodes
2006–2009, 2012–2013	Wild at Heart	Rosie Trevanion	Main role
2009	Looking for Eric	Sam	Film
2010	Casualty	Deena Richards	Episode: "Winter Wonderland"
2016	Doctors	Rhiannon Davis	Recurring role
2017	Dance Dance Dance	Herself	Contestant; runner-up
2018	Age Before Beauty	Dayna	3 Episodes
2018–2023	Hollyoaks	Donna-Marie Quinn	Regular role
2019	Moving On	Karina	Episode: "Isabelle"
2024	Casualty	Adele Thompson	Episode: "All I Want for Christmas"

== Awards and nominations ==
Year	Award	Category	Work	Result	Ref.
2017	2017 British Soap Awards	Villain of the Year	Doctors	Won	
2023	Inside Soap Awards	Best Actress	Hollyoaks	Nominated	
