= Kathryn Hunt =

British actress

- Born: Kathryn Hunt; United Kingdom
- Occupation: Actress
- Years active: 1990–2014
- Television: Coronation Street (1990, 2002–2005); Where the Heart Is (1997–1999); Fat Friends (2000–2002); Drop Dead Gorgeous (2006–2007)

Kathryn Hunt is a British actress best known for her roles as Angela Harris in Coronation Street and Val Lorrimer in Series 1–2 of Fat Friends. She also appeared in Waterloo Road, The Royal, Drop Dead Gorgeous and Where the Heart Is, in which she portrayed Cheryl Lampard from 1998 until 2000.
