= Sean Wilson (actor) =

English actor and cheesemaker

- Born: 4 April 1965 (age 61); Ashton-under-Lyne, Lancashire, England
- Occupations: Actor; chef
- Years active: 1983–2024 (actor); 2005– (chef and businessman)
- Known for: Coronation Street (1985–2005, 2018)

Sean Wilson (born 4 April 1965) is an English actor and cheesemaker, best known for his role as Martin Platt in Coronation Street, which he played from 1985 to 2005 and for a brief stint in 2018.

== Career ==
Wilson joined the cast of Coronation Street in 1985 as Martin Platt. The character was 16, had left school and taken a job at the cafe managed by Gail Tilsley. Five years later, Gail was a widow and he became involved with her romantically. They married, divorced, and in between he became father to David Platt. Wilson has said the main reason for leaving the serial in 2005 was because producers informed him of a storyline where he would date an underage girl and he did not agree with it. He subsequently appeared in several other UK television dramas, including an appearance in Waterloo Road as Darren Briggs, Sr, a student's father whose crush on teacher Davina Shackleton gets out of hand.

Wilson also became a chef after leaving Coronation Street. He has cooked in several Michelin-starred restaurants, and is also a cheesemaker and purveyor of cheesy comestibles with his own business, Saddleworth Cheese Company. His book The Great Northern Cookbook was published in 2012. The accompanying TV series was shown on Channel 5, starting in January 2013. In 2018, Wilson reprised his role as Martin Platt in Coronation Street for a few episodes.

Wilson is a patron of a UK charity, Development of Children and Women Centre Nepal.

== Filmography ==
Year	Title	Type	Role	Notes
1984	Crown Court	TV	Terry Day	Episode: "Paki Basher: Part 1"
1984	Travelling Man	TV	Boy	Episode: "Grasser"
1985–2005, 2018	Coronation Street	TV	Martin Platt	Series regular; 1,645 episodes
2006	Dancing on Ice	TV	Himself	Contestant; 6th place
2006	Silent Witness	TV	Alan McBain	Episodes: "Terminus: Parts 1 & 2"
2006	Casualty	TV	Steve Bennett	Episode: "Perfect Day"
2006	Dalziel and Pascoe	TV	Ken Lawson	Episodes: "Fallen Angel: Parts 1 & 2"
2006	Doctors	TV	Paul Williams	Episode: "Unforeseen"
2008	Waterloo Road	TV	Darren Brigg Snr	Series 3: Episodes 11 & 12
2008	The Royal	TV	Dennis Sedgefield	Episode: "Home from the Hill"
2009	Doctors	TV	Ged Barry	Episode: "Much Ado About Something"
2013	The Great Northern Cookbook	TV	Himself	Cookery TV series; aired on Channel 5

== Book ==
- Cheddar Gorged (Great Northern Books, 10 October 2022) ISBN 978-1914227288
