= List of Coronation Street characters introduced in 2002 =

The following is a list of characters that first appeared in the ITV soap opera Coronation Street in 2002, by order of first appearance.

== Hazel Wilding ==
Hazel Wilding
- Coronation Street character
- Portrayed by: Kazia Pelka
- First appearance: 23 January 2002
- Last appearance: 18 March 2002
In-universe information
- Husband: John Wilding

Hazel Wilding first appears on 23 January 2002 when cab driver Vikram Desai (Chris Bisson) picks up her from an upmarket suburb. Immediately, Hazel flirts heavily with Vikram and she then requests his services more frequently. It is not long before Hazel seduces Vikram at a hotel wearing lingerie and bearing a bottle of champagne. In February 2002, Vikram is shocked to discover that Hazel is married and feels that things between them have become too complicated. He then keeps a distance from her by sending other drivers when she requests his cab.

It is not long before Vikram resumes his secret affair with Hazel as she gives him a gold bracelet for his birthday and he dumps girlfriend Bobbi Lewis for Hazel. When Les Battersby (Bruce Jones) comes to collect Hazel one day, he is very suggestive and she slaps him. She demands to know what Vikram has told his staff at the office about her. Vikram is livid with Les and confides in his cousin Dev Alahan (Jimmi Harkishin) that he has fallen in love with Hazel. When Hazel's husband John discovers the affair, he threatens Vikram to stay away from his wife. Hazel later makes it clear to Vikram that she will not leave John for him, and after several threats from John, Hazel tells Vikram that she was in on his plan all along.

== Archie Shuttleworth ==
Archie Shuttleworth
- Coronation Street character
- Portrayed by: Roy Hudd
- Duration: 2002–2003, 2006, 2010
- First appearance: 17 February 2002
- Last appearance: 10 May 2010
In-universe information
- Occupation: Undertaker
- Sisters: Stella
- Wife: Joan Shuttleworth
- Sons: George Shuttleworth
- Daughters: Glenda Shuttleworth

Archie Shuttleworth, played by actor Roy Hudd, is a local undertaker.

Blanche Hunt (Maggie Jones) introduces her boyfriend, undertaker Archie Shuttleworth, to her family and friends. Archie thinks Blanche is a laugh; she fakes weakness to win sympathy from Archie, and is cheered up by Archie's visit. Blanche has a date with Archie despite Blanche's daughter Deirdre Rachid (Anne Kirkbride) and her partner Ken Barlow (William Roache) arriving home to find them dancing in the front room. Archie invites Blanche to go to Blackpool for the weekend with him. Blanche says she will think about it; Deirdre is horrified. Jack Duckworth (Bill Tarmey) offers his services to Archie as a pallbearer; Archie says he will bear it in mind if they are ever desperate. Archie and Blanche leave for Blackpool in Archie's hearse. Blanche and Archie arrive back from Blackpool, where they have had a good time ballroom dancing. Deirdre is shocked to learn that they stayed in Archie's caravan, which is open plan. Blanche tells Norris Cole (Malcolm Hebden) and Betty Williams (Betty Driver) that she is going to one of Archie's funerals, and persuades Betty to join them. Archie tries to flatter Norris's work employee Rita Sullivan (Barbara Knox) into also becoming a professional mourner, but she refuses. After letting Blanche down by cancelling their plans for a day out, Archie promises to take her out for a slap-up meal the following evening.

Archie tries to apologise for standing Blanche up, but she is having none of it. Archie turns up at the Barlows' house to serenade Blanche, attracting many The Rovers Return Inn customers who are touched by his gesture. Blanche forgives Archie. Archie arrives early at the Barlows' house, making Deirdre think that he stayed the night. Blanche is pleased when she hears this. Archie chats up Audrey Roberts (Sue Nicholls) at the bar, making Blanche jealous but Archie wants Audrey to make dead people look their best but she refuses. After Archie flatters Audrey about her hairdressing skills, she caves in and agrees to see to Archie's clients' hair. Audrey does her first dead person's hair on Edwina Levy, Archie's former hairdresser, and finds it very rewarding. Archie compliments Audrey on her hairdressing skills in The Rovers, unaware that Ken's son Peter Barlow (Chris Gascoyne) is watching. He winds Blanche up about Archie's "other woman" and when Blanche sees Audrey getting into Archie's car, she accuses Archie of two-timing her. Archie says he was just giving Audrey a lift. Archie tells Audrey he does not like lying but Audrey is adamant she does not want her customers to know that she is now "beautician to the dead". When Blanche sees them together, she accuses Archie of being dishonest and throws a glass of water over him so he tells her that Audrey is working for him. He asks Blanche not to tell anyone as Audrey is worried that it would be bad for business. Blanche forgives him.

Blanche overhears Maxine Peacock (Tracy Shaw) and Maria Sutherland (Samia Ghadie) in The Rovers gossiping about Audrey and Archie disappearing together. She explains that Audrey works for Archie and asks them not to say anything as it is a secret. Norris overhears. Audrey is furious when she realises everybody knows that she is working for Archie, telling Archie that she thought she could trust him. Archie is very upset with Blanche and tells her their relationship is over. Blanche is devastated. Blanche tells Deirdre that Archie has finished with her and sobs her heart out. Audrey realises that her working for Archie has not affected her business. Deirdre tells Archie how upset Blanche is but he will not change his mind. As Blanche rushes to take a phone call she thinks is from Archie she trips, falls down the stairs and bangs her head. Audrey smugly tells Rita that Archie finished with Blanche as a result of her blabbing Audrey's hairdressing secret all over The Rovers. Archie visits Blanche to get his dance records back. He sees her lifeless body through the letterbox and shoulder charges the door down. Norris calls an ambulance. She is alive but barely conscious. Archie visits Blanche in hospital. Blanche assumes their relationship is back on but Archie looks worried. When Blanche comes home, Archie visits and explains to Blanche that her accident has not changed anything. Blanche is very upset and cries after he has gone. Blanche sees her letter printed in the problem page of the Gazette, unaware that Ken has written the reply telling her to move on and forget Archie.

Richard Hillman's (Brian Capron) day goes from bad to worse when Archie gives him the bill for the wedding cars. Audrey tells Archie and Rita about the laundry in the kitchen. They tell her it is just absent-mindedness. Richard expresses his upset about the finding of his ex-wife Patricia Hillman's (Annabelle Apsion) body to his current wife Gail Hillman (Helen Worth). The police say the death was not suspicious. He feels responsible and asks Archie to hurry through a cremation. Charlotte Morris insists on going to the mortuary to see her best friend's body for the last time. Archie thinks that Charlotte should view the body. Audrey thinks that she is going mad and is badly shaken, confiding in Archie and Richard. Archie tries to reassure Audrey that she is not losing her marbles. Archie is concerned about Audrey and makes her promise to see a doctor.

Audrey discovers that her dress is missing and panics about her "memory loss", confiding in Archie. She later tells him and Rita that she has booked a doctor's appointment. Audrey and Archie visit the Moxton Street drycleaners and pick up the dress. She asks the assistant if she recognises her but the assistant thinks she is mad. Steve brings Audrey's glasses into The Rovers after she left them in his taxi and gives them to Archie. He tries to call Audrey but the call does not connect. Archie is worried and persuades Steve McDonald (Simon Gregson) to drive him to Audrey's house, which he does. Archie and Steve are horrified to see Audrey's house on fire. Archie calls an ambulance and the fire brigade while Steve rescues Audrey. The paramedics take Audrey and Steve to hospital and Archie goes to No.8 to tell Gail and Richard. Gail panics and she and Richard go to the hospital. Richard looks satisfied that Audrey is in intensive care. Richard tells Archie that the fire has proved that Audrey is becoming a danger to herself. Lucy brings flowers to the Street for Audrey. Archie sees her and invites her for a drink in The Rovers. Richard tells Rita and Archie that Audrey is not well and cannot have visitors, but she sneaks out of the house. David sees her, and tells Gail and Richard.

Audrey reaches Archie's house, followed by Richard. She begs Archie to let her stay, and he tells Richard that it is best if she stays the night. Once safely indoors, she tells Archie that she has realised that Richard is after her money. Audrey tells Archie that Richard has been trying to kill her all along, but when Archie lets Richard in to his house, Audrey starts screaming, so he makes Richard leave. Audrey wants to call the police, but Archie insists she calm down first, so Audrey realises that Archie does not believe her. Audrey tries to prove that she is sane by showing Archie how she passed the doctor's memory tests. However, this backfires. When Gail phones Archie, she asks if she can visit, but Archie suggests she stay away for now. Richard tells Gail about his experiences with his mother's Alzheimer's disease, but Audrey realises that she was with Archie when her dress was taken to the cleaners. Audrey lists to Archie all the things which make her suspicious of Richard. Archie also finds that he has reasons to suspect Richard too, Richard having told him there were no batteries in the fire alarm before the fire inspection results were known. Audrey and Archie think that Richard may have killed his ex-wife Patricia. Audrey thinks that Gail is in danger, and wants to go to the police. Archie tells her to go to see Gail before contacting the police. Gail and Richard go to collect Audrey. She becomes hysterical again when she sees Richard, and Archie tells them to leave. Archie tells Audrey that first thing the next morning they should go to the police and tell them all about Richard. Audrey and Archie go to the police to report Richard. Gail and Richard go to Archie's house to confront Archie and Audrey about the allegations. In a heated argument, Audrey accuses Gail of plotting to kill her too when she discovers that she has given Richard a complete alibi for the night of the fire. The police tell Audrey and Archie that they will not be taking matters any further. Archie is angry with Audrey for trying to take the children. He thinks she has made things worse for herself. Archie persuades Audrey that she needs a break. He tells her that his sister Stella has a guest house in the Lake District. Audrey agrees to go there.

Richard gets angry when Archie refuses to tell him where Audrey is staying. The Hillmans go Christmas shopping. Audrey formulates a plan to let herself into their house while they are at a pantomime and look for clues in Richard's briefcase. She tells Archie her plan, but he is unhappy about it. Audrey and Archie let themselves into No. 8 and start going through Richard's papers and computer. Audrey discovers that he has got Gail to remortgage the house and that he has a lot of money tied up in Emily Bishop's (Eileen Derbyshire) house. Bethany spills a drink in the car and the family return home so that Sarah and Gail can change their clothes. They catch Audrey and Archie red-handed. Audrey pleads with Gail to see Richard for what he is, a murderer and a crook, but Gail throws her mother out, saying she is mad. Emily bumps into Audrey and Archie, who have nowhere to go for dinner and kindly invites them to her house. Emily, Norris, Rita, Audrey and Archie have Christmas dinner together. Audrey tells Archie, Norris and Rita that Richard practically admitted trying to kill her. Audrey, Archie and Norris try to convince Emily that her life is in danger from Richard. Audrey tells Archie that she is going to play Richard at his own game in order to win back her family. Audrey overhears Richard talking to Gail about the bank manager panicking and their cash flow glitch. Richard offers to drive her back to Archie's house and she has to accept.

Audrey tells Archie that her house is nearly ready to move back in to. Archie is disappointed, as he has enjoyed Audrey's company. Archie manages to get Ashley to talk about Maxine's funeral arrangements. Audrey agrees to do Maxine's hair for the funeral, and Archie is grateful. Whilst the vicar is committing Maxine's body to the ground, Audrey suddenly flips and shouts across the grave, calling Richard a murderer and saying that he killed Maxine; Archie calms her down. Audrey and Archie conclude that Richard is the one who drugged Aidan and attacked Maxine and Emily. Audrey, Archie, Gail's ex-husband Martin Platt (Sean Wilson), Gail, Sarah and David are all at Audrey's house when the police call and tell them that they've found a body at The Ridings, which they believe to be that of Patricia. Gail is devastated.

Audrey, Archie, Norris and Rita amongst others are in The Rovers awaiting news after Richard kidnaps Gail, Sarah, David and Bethany. They all escape, apart from Richard, who dies at the scene. Gail asks Archie to sort out Richard's funeral. She wants the least fuss, with no guests and no service; however, Gail changes her mind, and attends Richard's funeral. She feels bitter and empty. Archie conducts the service, although they are the only two people present. Audrey talks to Archie about reopening the salon and finding a replacement for Maxine; Audrey is panicking. She confides in Archie that she has checked her investments to find that they have plummeted, and she is not sure that she can afford to bail Gail out as promised. Audrey cannot bring herself to tell Gail that she is unable to bail her out, so instead she confides in Archie that she is going to take out a loan against her own house. Archie persuades Blanche to attend a tea dance with him. Blanche plays hard to get but is delighted on the quiet. Les Battersby (Bruce Jones) asks Ken to be a character witness for him. Ken refuses. In desperation Les asks Shelley Unwin (Sally Lindsay) and Archie, both of whom refuse. Deirdre rings her daughter Tracy Barlow (Kate Ford) and realises from the sound of the pool in the background where she is, with Wally Bannister. She gets Archie to take her there and she and Tracy fight, falling into the pool as they do so.

Audrey is concerned to find Archie sitting on the bench outside the salon looking unwell. Audrey worries about Archie's health and suggests he is working too hard. Archie still does not look well. Audrey arranges to go round and cook him a meal. Archie hatches a plan to surprise Audrey on her birthday. Mike Baldwin (Johnny Briggs) invites Audrey to Delphines for her birthday. Archie persuades Mike to cancel as he has already secretly booked a table. Mike tells Audrey that Archie is waiting for her at Delphines. Audrey arrives late, but Archie is delighted to see her. After supper, he amazes her by proposing. Audrey gives him a definite maybe. Fred is shocked and jealous when Archie tells him that he has proposed to Audrey. Audrey seeks Gail's advice about Archie. Gail admits that life is always easier with a good man beside you. Archie is left distraught when Audrey tells him that she cannot marry him. He confides in Deirdre that he not think he will ever get over it. Audrey is upset at the thought of hurting Archie and is horrified when Deirdre tells her that she thinks Archie has gone for good. In July 2003, Archie leaves the street.

Three years later, in April 2006, Archie returns to Weatherfield as Mike's funeral takes place. He is carried to the church in a glass carriage pulled by two black horses. Blanche and Audrey are both surprised to see that Archie is the undertaker. Blanche embarrasses Audrey by introducing Keith to Archie as Audrey's boyfriend. Keith's obvious jealousy of Archie starts to irritate Audrey. Archie, Rita, Emily, Norris and Audrey all enjoy a good laugh over a few drinks. Blanche is excited at the fact that Archie is back and hopes that something will happen between them. Blanche confides her feelings about Archie to Deirdre. Blanche, Archie, Emily and Rita are all drinking in the Rovers and Blanche is obviously dressed up for the occasion because Archie is there. Blanche decides to ask Archie about their relationship however he does not seem to think they have one. Archie asks Rita to the theatre with him and she accepts. Rita has her hair done in the salon before her theatre visit with Archie. Archie asks Rita to go to Chatsworth House on a day out with him. Audrey is jealous of all the places Archie is taking Rita out to. Audrey is jealous of Archie and Rita's relationship and is feeling fed up with Keith. After having a drink with Archie, Audrey tells Keith he is boring and she does not want to see him anymore. Keith thinks it is down to Archie and tries to confront him about it.

In May 2006, Norris, Blanche and Emily gossip in The Kabin about Rita and Archie. Rita overhears. Norris makes it clear to Archie he does not approve of him taking Rita out. Rita and Audrey are jealous of each other's friendship with Archie. Archie leaves but returns in October 2006. Archie calls at Ashley's house to sort out the paperwork for Fred's funeral. Archie takes Audrey to the Rovers. Audrey tries to buy Rita a drink but Rita declines, still cold towards her. Archie then leaves again.

Four years later, in May 2010, Archie returns for the funeral of Blanche. He leaves straight afterwards. In December 2018, Audrey tells Rita that Archie has died. In 2020, the son of Archie, George (Tony Maudsley), is introduced, and he explains that after Archie's death, he inherited the funeral directors business.

== Joshua Peacock ==
Joshua Peacock
- Coronation Street character
- Portrayed by: Brandon Jackson (2002–2004); Benjamin Beresford (2003–2011)
- Duration: 2002–2011
- First appearance: 8 April 2002
- Last appearance: 14 January 2011
- Introduced by: Kieran Roberts
In-universe information
- Occupation: Student
- Father: Matt Ramsden
- Mother: Maxine Peacock
- Adoptive father: Ashley Peacock
- Adoptive mother: Claire Peacock
- Brothers: Freddie Peacock (adoptive)
- Grandfathers: Derek Heavey; Fred Elliott (adoptive)
- Grandmothers: Doreen Heavey

Joshua "Josh" Peacock was born on 8 April 2002 at Weatherfield General Hospital. He was the result of a one-night stand between Maxine Peacock (Tracy Shaw) and Matt Ramsden (Stephen Beckett), though was raised by Maxine's husband Ashley Peacock (Steven Arnold), and his new wife Claire (Julia Haworth), after his mother Maxine is murdered by serial killer Richard Hillman (Brian Capron) when Joshua is nine months old. Matt had regular contact with his son, and Joshua has a younger half-brother by Ashley and Claire, Freddie, who was born when Joshua was four. On 23 April 2010 it was announced that the Peacock family had been axed from the ITV soap by new producer Phil Collinson, and would leave in the coming months.

Joshua becomes good friends with Simon Barlow (Alex Bain) when he is enrolled in his primary school in December 2008. In April 2009, Ashley's employee Graeme Proctor (Craig Gazey) sees Joshua's talent at football, which he encourages Ashley and Claire to nurture. Claire initially disapproves of Joshua playing football but then encourages him after seeing how good he is. In August 2009, during a charity fete that Claire has organised, Joshua complains that his throat is sore and collapses in front of Janice Battersby (Vicky Entwistle); he has swallowed a bee. He is immediately rushed to hospital where he makes a full recovery to his parents' relief.

In December 2010, a huge explosion at The Joinery Bar causes a fire to start in Number 13 Coronation Street, the home of the Peacocks. Joshua is one of the children in the house at the time and is rescued by Lloyd Mullaney (Craig Charles). However Ashley is killed in the accident, trying to rescue Simon's father Peter Barlow (Chris Gascoyne). Joshua attends his funeral on 16 December 2010 telling Claire that he wants to say goodbye to his father.

In January 2011, after Claire attacks Tracy Barlow (Kate Ford), Joshua leaves Weatherfield with her and Freddie and goes to live in France.

== Aidan Critchley ==
Aidan Critchley
- Coronation Street character
- Portrayed by: Dean Ashton
- Duration: 2002–2003
- First appearance: 12 April 2002
- Last appearance: 17 March 2003
In-universe information
- Father: Bob Critchley

Aidan "Ade" Critchley, played by Dean Ashton, made his first appearance on 12 April 2002. Ashton had previously appeared in bit parts on TV shows, before securing the role of Aidan after three auditions. He commented, "I've never really had a proper part before. I've enjoyed myself more because I've made the role of Aidan Critchley my own." Ashton told Billy Sloan of the Sunday Mail that he enjoyed portraying Aidan as he got to act out things he would never do in real life. He thought Aidan was an attention seeker and "a bit of a show-off," while Sloan described him as "obnoxious" and a character viewers loved to hate. The writer also observed, "He's every school teacher's worst nightmare... and the boy next door from hell for every mother." Ashton explained that he got into character when he put on Aidan's trademark black leather jacket and eyebrow ring. He also thought that Aidan's upbringing had something to do with his bad actions and attitude.

Aidan was a pupil at Weatherfield Comprehensive School, who made life difficult for his teacher Ken Barlow (William Roache). He began dating Sarah-Louise Platt (Tina O'Brien) and led her astray, while also becoming friendly with her best friend Candice Stowe (Nikki Sanderson). They drank alcohol and played truant, causing Sarah's step-father Richard Hillman (Brian Capron) to warn him off. Aidan took Sarah for a joyride in his car and he crashed into a lorry. He left Sarah for dead and she broke up with him. Richard framed Aidan for killing Maxine Peacock (Tracy Shaw), resulting in his arrest. Aidan was proven innocent when Richard later confessed.

== Joe Carter ==
Joe Carter
- Coronation Street character
- Portrayed by: Jonathan Wrather
- Duration: 2002–2003
- First appearance: 26 May 2002
- Last appearance: 20 June 2003
- Introduced by: Kieran Roberts
In-universe information
- Occupation: Factory manager Businessman

Joe Carter was played by Jonathan Wrather. Upon Joe's release from prison in May 2002, after serving two years for fraud, Joe Carter is picked up by factory owner Mike Baldwin (Johnny Briggs) and brought to Coronation Street to work as factory manager in Underworld. He immediately clashes with Dev Alahan (Jimmi Harkishin) when he asks Geena Gregory (Jennifer James) out on a date. Dev later tries to warn Joe off, accusing him of being a crook just out of prison. Joe is angry and threatens Dev. Joe successfully woos Geena with his charm and they start going out much to Dev's indignation. In revenge, Joe is infuriated when the factory girls discover that he has been in prison, thanks to Dev making it public knowledge, attempting to split him and Geena up. However, Geena gives Joe a second chance but Joe has another enemy, Karen McDonald (Suranne Jones), who wanted the management position herself. He infuriates her further when he sacks her.

Joe's relationship with Geena suffers when he is trying to constantly outdo Dev in business matters. In September 2002, the factory do business with Dev's cousin, Naveen Alahan (Parvez Qadir), but problems arise when Naveen's cheques keep bouncing. Joe makes some calls and finds out that Naveen's business is about to go into receivership. Without Naveen's money, Underworld is in danger of going under so Joe and Steve McDonald (Simon Gregson), take a van to Naveen's warehouse and take Mike's stock back, which Steve is not happy about. They manage to retrieve the stock and flee after they trigger the security alarm. However, the robbery backfires when police go to the factory to do a routine enquiry. Mike is furious about Joe's reckless actions as he could be an accessory to the crime as he lied to the police about the missing stock. When Mike points out that there are no buyers to purchase the stock that Joe has retrieved, he cons Naveen by tricking him into buying the knicker order originally meant for him and makes him pay cash. Naveen is furious when he realizes what has happened. Dev tells Geena about Joe breaking into the warehouse. Geena confronts Joe and is shocked when he is angry with Dev for telling her. This leads to a violent fight in the Rovers between the two men and Geena breaks up with Joe. When Geena tells the police that Joe threw the first punch, Joe manipulates her by saying that her testimony will get him sent back to prison. Naive Geena reconciles with Joe, unaware that he is using her to get Dev to drop the charges. Dev agrees, on the condition that she ends the relationship with Joe, who suggests to Geena that they pretend that they have broken up and she should get back with Dev, attempting to consolidate the lie. However, Dev realizes what Geena is doing and throws her out. Joe gets increasingly worried about the police arresting him and puts it to Dev that if he drops the charges, he will dump Geena. Later on, Dev tells Geena about his deal with Joe and how he had already dropped the charges, telling her that it is up to her what she decides to do. When Joe breaks up with her, as he had promised, Geena is devastated and leaves Weatherfield.

In February 2003, a drunk Mike offers Joe a share in the factory if he will agree to be his partner. After more negotiating, Mike gives Joe control of the factory. After he sacks Hayley Cropper (Julie Hesmondhalgh) and makes Karen supervisor, Steve becomes suspicious of the relationship between Karen and Joe and accuses them of having sex. Over time the factory girls begin to also speculate about them, especially after they go clubbing together after a staff night out. Steve's suspicions are also aroused and he is convinced that they are having an affair, Steve punches him and dumps Karen. However, the McDonald's reconcile, much to Joe's disappointment as he is in love with Karen. Joe deliberately flirts with other women to make Karen jealous, his ploy pays off. Joe steps up his campaign to get Karen when he takes her to a business conference in Wolverhampton, where he comes on to her. Although she initially turns him down, she eventually sleeps with him, after her marriage to Steve breaks down when he is unfaithful. Joe has a master plan that involves Karen. He explains to her that he intends to ruin Mike and take over the factory, asking her to help him to do it. When Joe tempts her with the lure of the possibility of a plush apartment, Karen agrees to the scam. Joe tells Karen that as his partner, she will have to get Mike to sign cheques to his bogus company, Artrec (an anagram of Carter). Instead, however, Karen forges Mike's signature, much to Joe's delight. Just after Mike has signed the final cheque to seal the deal for the couple, he suddenly announces that he is doing a full stock take, much to their horror. Joe and an ex-con friend, Frank Marsden (Martin Walsh), burgle the factory so that Mike will never know that no stock from Artrec was delivered. Joe then takes Mike to a deserted warehouse pretending that this is Artrec's address. They speak to a bogus security guard, Frank, who tells them that Artrec disappeared a few days ago. Frank describes the owner as an Asian man, which makes Mike think that Naveen Alahan is behind the con.

With the factory in fiscal crisis and redundancies being made, Karen's guilty conscience gets the better of her and she tells Mike everything. Mike drags Joe into the office and lets him know that he has uncovered the whole scam. Karen overhears Joe telling Mike that the only reason he started a relationship with Karen was so that he could use her for forging cheques. Karen is hurt and angry. To Joe's horror, Karen gives Mike a list of every detail pertaining to Artrec that he requested and tells him that she has transferred all the money they stole from him back into his account. To avoid being a laughing stock in the rag trade, Mike agrees not to call the police but tells Joe he never wants to set eyes on him again. Joe and Karen row as Joe packs his things to leave. Karen wants to know if he ever loved her at all, to which Joe coldly replies that she had her uses, before leaving Weatherfield.

== Lillian Spencer ==
Lillian Spencer
- Coronation Street character
- Portrayed by: Maureen Lipman
- First appearance: 1 July 2002
- Last appearance: 10 July 2002
In-universe information
- Occupation: Bar Manageress
- Sons: Timothy Spencer
- Daughters: Danielle Spencer

Lillian Spencer, an old friend of Fred Elliott (John Savident), arrives at The Rovers Return Inn as the Relief Manager. Lillian thinks The Rovers is a come-down after having worked in the Xanadu Cocktail Bar of the Majestic Hotel in Cleethorpes and then the Golf Club, where Mike Baldwin (Johnny Briggs) plays. She soon asserts her authority by barring Norris Cole (Malcolm Hebden) for being rude about the state of the bar top and subsequently Rita Sullivan (Barbara Knox) who complains about her treatment of barmaid Shelley Unwin (Sally Lindsay).

Audrey Roberts (Sue Nicholls) takes an instant disliking to Lillian and warns Fred about her, but he will not listen. She storms out watched by a smirking Lillian. Lillian then makes Jack Duckworth (Bill Tarmey) redundant on the grounds of old age and ill health. Wife Vera (Liz Dawn) storms into the pub and has a fight with Lillian. She then gives the cellar man job to son Timothy.

With staff morale reaching an all-time low and the arrival of Lillian's daughter Danielle (Kelly Wenham), Geena Gregory (Jennifer James) and Shelley threaten to leave, much to Fred's distress. Fred feels that Lillian and her family are taking over, however, Lillian gets a phone call offering her a better job in Marple and with that the Spencers pack up and leave.

== Ciaran McCarthy ==
Ciaran McCarthy, played by Keith Duffy. He made his first on-screen appearance on 7 August 2002, before departing in 2005. He returned in 2010 until Duffy temporary departed in January 2011 to go on Boyzone Tour, and returned on 3 November 2011. Duffy departed the role again on 25 November 2011 due to family commitments although he stated his intention to eventually return as Ciaran. In his duration on the show the character has been at the centre of several romances including relationships with Sunita Alahan (Shobna Gulati), Tracy Barlow (Kate Ford) and Michelle Connor (Kym Marsh). Ciaran has been characterised as a ladies' man and a charmer. The character is also known for his "sex symbol" status. Duffy has received nominations at various soap award ceremonies for his portrayal of Ciaran.

== Naveen Alahan ==
Naveen Alahan
- Coronation Street character
- Portrayed by: Parvez Qadir
- Duration: 2002–2003
- First appearance: 28 August 2002
- Last appearance: 6 June 2003
- Introduced by: Kieran Roberts
In-universe information
- Occupation: Clothing Wholesaler; Businessman
- First cousins: Dev Alahan

Naveen Alahan, played by Parvez Qadir, was the cousin of Dev Alahan (Jimmi Harkishin), who he introduces to Mike Baldwin (Johnny Briggs) as he is a clothing wholesaler. He placed a large order of five thousand pairs of garments, which worked the factory employees very hard, however the delivery date was reached successfully. However, Naveen's cheque bounces, news that Mike takes calmly despite putting the future of Underworld on the line, but asks Dev, who is his trusted friend, to help him sort out what the issue was. Mike's deputy, Joe Carter (Jonathan Wrather) took the news far more personally due to his conflict with Dev over his relationship with Geena Gregory (Jennifer James) and how he and Naveen left him out of discussions regarding the deal in the first place. These events were followed with a vendetta from Joe.

Although Naveen considered Joe a crook, he was also on the wrong side of the law as it was revealed in April 2004 when he dumped several thousand pounds' worth of Rolex watches on Dev when police investigations came too close to him. Dev was more than happy to help Naveen because he was family, but his fiancée, Maya Sharma (Sasha Behar) was less eager to help and hid the watches in Cornflake packets so the police didn't find them when they visited the corner shop. Maya then urged that Dev got rid of them before they caused them anymore problems.

== Harry Flagg ==
Harry Flagg
- Coronation Street character
- Portrayed by: Iain Rogerson
- Duration: 2002–2004
- First appearance: 6 September 2002
- Last appearance: 6 August 2004
In-universe information
- Occupation: Cleaner
- Daughters: Caroline Flagg

Harry Flagg was played by Iain Rogerson. Harry worked at Manchester Airport for over 20 years as a cleaner, including a long stint in the VIP suite. Mourning the death of his 18-year-old daughter to Leukemia, he frequently drank at The Rovers Return Inn. Having visited the pub and commented on how "unclean" it appeared, Harry agreed to clean it for a few pints of beer and £10. Having made such a good job of it, Landlord, Fred Elliott took him on full-time. Soon Harry became potman and cellarman. He also cleaned at Underworld for Mike Baldwin (Johnny Briggs), saving businessman Preston King from a heart attack at one point. He clashed with Frankie Baldwin (Debra Stephenson) when her husband Danny Baldwin (Bradley Walsh) became a shareholder in Underworld, she teased him and labeled him 'Half Mast' referring to his surname. Harry eventually left the street to drive around the sights of Europe. He offered Eileen Grimshaw (Sue Cleaver) the chance to come with him, but she declined.

== Lucy Richards ==
Lucy Barlow (also Richards) is a florist whom Peter Barlow (Chris Gascoyne) meets while buying a bouquet for Shelley Unwin (Sally Lindsay). He is instantly attracted to her, and an affair begins. Lucy, unknown to Peter, has hired Tracy Barlow (Kate Ford) to cover her maternity leave. When Tracy tells Peter that her employer is pregnant, Peter realises the child could be his. He later marries Lucy, telling her that he and Shelley have split up. Tracy, however, knows otherwise and is happy to keep quiet and be bridesmaid to Lucy and later Shelley when Peter bigamously marries her.

== Charlotte Morris ==
Charlotte Morris
- Coronation Street character
- Portrayed by: Joanne Zorian
- First appearance: 4 October 2002
- Last appearance: 9 October 2002

Charlotte Morris, played by Joanne Zorian, was the sister-in-law of Richard Hillman (Brian Capron) - a financial advisor who previously married her best-friend Patricia (Annabelle Apsion).

She makes her first appearance on 4 October 2002. Charlotte visited Richard in his new home, Weatherfield, with the news that the police have found Patricia dead; in reality, Richard murdered her nearly 5 months ago after she tried to extort money from her ex-husband in a bid to relinquish her 20% of ownership to their business company "Kellett Holdings". Charlotte quickly grows suspicious when she learns that Richard has already sorted out Patricia's funeral arrangement, and refuses to let Charlotte identify her body. This soon leads to Charlotte requesting that Richard and his new wife, Gail Platt (Helen Worth), invite her to their house for dinner in order to clear up the matter with Patricia. While Richard is against the idea, Gail invites Charlotte as she believes that Richard needs to clear Patricia out of his thoughts whatsoever. At dinner, tensions rise when Charlotte recognizes that the bracelet Gail is wearing is exactly the one that Patricia had and she argues with Richard when he makes fabrications about how he knew the bracelet. Soon afterwards, Richard offers to take Charlotte home; she reluctantly agrees, but he then warns her to stay away from him and Gail - appearing very tempted to kill Charlotte as he delivers the threat. This causes Charlotte to leave Weatherfield, but not before apologizing to Gail and Richard for giving them trouble about Patricia.

== Mick Hopwood ==
Mick Hopwood
- Coronation Street character
- Portrayed by: Ian Gain
- Duration: 2002–2003
- First appearance: 21 October 2002
- Last appearance: 2 September 2003
- Introduced by: Kieran Roberts
In-universe information
- Occupation: Police Constable

Michael "Mick" Hopwood was a local police constable and a resident of Coronation Street. Whilst in Weatherfield, he lived at number 14a and had a relationship with Janice Battersby (Vicky Entwistle), causing a rivalry with her ex-husband Les (Bruce Jones). On one occasion, he stopped Les after he drove through a red light and was provoked into fighting him in front of fellow officer Emma Watts (Angela Lonsdale). Les was then arrested for assaulting a police officer and served a three-month prison sentence after Emma backed up Mick's fraudulent statement. A month after Les' release, Mick proposed to Janice, but after she found out that he lied about his incident with Les, she declined it and he left Weatherfield.

== Tommy Harris ==
Thomas "Tommy" Harris (previously Nelson) was played by Thomas Craig.

== Angela Harris ==
Angela Harris was played by Kathryn Hunt.

Angela and her husband Tommy (Thomas Craig) and their children Katy (Lucy-Jo Hudson) and Craig (Richard Fleeshman) first appeared on the street, having rented Number 6 and using the last name "Nelson". They came originally from Sheffield where Angela worked in a pub. She witnessed a murder and gave evidence against the accused. But the family of the accused took their revenge with threats and eventually tried to burn their house. The Harris's were taken under the Witness Protection program, given a new identity as the Nelson family and moved to Weatherfield. Angela got a job in Underworld but it did not go well. Her husband Tommy was under suspicion of stealing a wallet in the garage where he found work and the women in the factory turned against Angela too. Only Hayley Cropper (Julie Hesmondhalgh) made friends with Angela and eventually found out and kept the family's secret.

In April 2003 however, Katy slipped away to see her friends in Sheffield and was followed by the brothers of the man who was jailed on Angela's evidence. There was a showdown and Tommy was shot in the process. The culprits were found and the family's secret was revealed. Angela was determined that she would not put her family through any more hiding and secrecy. The Harris's took their own name back and the residents came round to being more neighbourly again.

Near the end of 2003, Tommy and Angela split up. Katy took up with Martin Platt (Sean Wilson) and though disapproving, Angela could not bear to be estranged from her daughter. She and Tommy fell out over the situation and split up for a while. They made up but it was an uneasy peace.

In 2005, Angela discovered that Katy was pregnant. Not thrilled, she nonetheless supported her daughter. Tommy thought Martin was having an affair with Sally Webster (Sally Dynevor), who was actually having an affair with Ian Davenport, and because circumstantial evidence seemed to support it, Angela believed it and took Katy in when she came running home. She also supported and encouraged Katy's decision to have an abortion, but was mortified to find out Martin really was faithful and Katy had had the abortion for nothing. Shortly after, Katy and Tommy rowed furiously in the garage and Katy struck and killed her father. Angela was horrified and she decided to cover up the crime and make it look like a robbery. Later she herself confessed to the murder in order to protect Katy and was remanded in prison. Even though Katy herself confessed before committing suicide, Angela was still guilty of perverting the course of justice and imprisoned for eight years. Her sentence would've been completed in 2013, but she has never been seen again.

== Katy Harris ==
Katy Harris was played by Lucy-Jo Hudson from 2002 to 2005.

== Craig Harris ==
Craig Harris was played by Richard Fleeshman. Fleeshman's parents David Fleeshman and Sue Jenkins had also starred in Coronation Street as Mr. Austin and Gloria Todd respectively. ITV announced in early June 2006 that Richard Fleeshman would be leaving the soap in the autumn of 2006. It was his decision to quit the role of Craig Harris in order to pursue a pop career. Fleeshman filmed his final scenes in late August 2006 and his final episode aired on 16 October 2006.

== Patrick Tussel ==
Patrick Tussel
- Coronation Street character
- Portrayed by: Trevor Dwyer-Lynch
- Duration: 2002–2005
- First appearance: 15 December 2002
- Last appearance: 23 January 2005
- Introduced by: Kieran Roberts
In-universe information
- Occupation: Taxi driver
- Sons: Luke Tussel; Russell Tussel

Patrick Tussel is played by actor and football coach Trevor Dwyer-Lynch. Patrick is a cab driver for local taxi firm "Streetcars", and friend of Eileen Grimshaw (Sue Cleaver) from when they were in a group in which Eileen was singer. Patrick frequently serves as a comic foil for Les Battersby (Bruce Jones) and boss Steve McDonald (Simon Gregson). Patrick makes his final appearance in January 2005, while on crutches after an off-screen incident where his own car ran him over due to the handbrake being left off.

== John Arnley ==
John Arnley
- Coronation Street character
- Portrayed by: Paul Warriner
- Duration: 2002–2003
- First appearance: 15 December 2002
- Last appearance: 3 February 2003
In-universe information
- Occupation: College tutor

John Arnley, played by Paul Warriner, made his first screen appearance on 15 December 2002. The character and casting was announced on 19 November 2002. Warriner previously appeared in Coronation Street as Ben Williams in 1990. Of his role, a spokesperson commented "Paul's role will really start off with a bang, and then a few twists." John began "a passionate affair" with his student Toyah Battersby (Georgia Taylor), but when she took him home to meet her flatmates, John set his sights on Maria Sutherland (Samia Ghadie). Maria initially rejected John's advances, but a love triangle soon developed, which prompted Toyah to decide to leave the Street.

John is Toyah Battersby's tutor at Granston Technical College. Toyah begins a relationship with John, but is reluctant to introduce him to her flatmates Fiz Brown (Jennie McAlpine) and Maria Sutherland. Toyah invites John to The Rovers Return Inn to meet Fiz and Maria and they are surprised to see that he is considerably older than Toyah. John takes Toyah to Bordeaux for a holiday and they become closer. However, John become attracted to Maria. Knowing that Fiz and Toyah are out, John calls at their flat and he and Maria have sex. Fiz catches them and insists that Maria tells Toyah. John makes it clear to Fiz that she will not reveal what happened as she would not want to hurt Toyah. He continues to make advances towards Maria, but she rejects him.

A few weeks later, Maria discovers that she is pregnant. When John finds out, he implies that Maria is promiscuous, which earns him a slap, and then offers to pay for an abortion. John tells Toyah that he feels her flatmates do not like him and suggests they move in together, which Toyah agrees to. While Toyah is berating Fiz for not liking John and not being supportive towards Maria, Fiz reveals the truth about their affair. Toyah confronts Maria, who gives her impression that John raped her. Because she was once raped herself, Toyah interrupts John's tutor groups and attacks him. John calms her down and Toyah breaks up with him.

A Daily Record reporter branded John "a new Weatherfield hunk", while a writer for the Huddersfield Daily Examiner called him "a love-rat lecturer".

== Other characters ==
Character	Episode date(s)	Actor	Circumstances
Goran Milanovic	17–26 May	Matt Zarb	An illegal immigrant from Croatia who worked at a Blackpool campsite where Toyah Battersby (Georgia Taylor). He was also a photography student, who had lived in Britain for seven years. He develops feelings for Toyah and proposes to her with the intention of staying in the UK, but she turns him down.
Patricia Hillman	12–20 May	Annabelle Apsion	The ex-wife of Weatherfield financial adviser Richard Hillman (Brian Capron), who arrives in Weatherfield wanting the money back that she invested in her former husband's business company, Kellett Holdings. When Richard learns the value of her investment, he argues with her at the foundations of his new apartment block and she falls into a trench. Richard initially attempts to help her, but changes his mind when Patricia vows to expose his deceit and she spits in his face. In response, Richard grabs a spade and - just as his ex-wife is about to depart - smacks her over the head with it, killing Patricia instantly. The foundations are then filled with concrete. Several months later, her body is dug up by police when Richard confesses to his new wife Gail Platt (Helen Worth) that he had murdered Patricia.
Carol Mills	20–26 May	Collette Cooper	A woman whom Kirk Sutherland (Andrew Whyment) takes a fancy to while holidaying in Blackpool. Kirk and Jason Grimshaw (Ryan Thomas) spend a lot of money on Carol and her daughter Stephanie (Rebecca Atkinson), however, Carol and Stephanie choose to dump them afterwards. They later spot Kirk and Jason in a pub, after winning £200 at bingo. Jason and Kirk spend the night in Carol and Stephanie's caravan. In the morning as they are leaving Stephanie calls Carol "mum", which amuses Jason as Kirk had had sex with Carol.
Stephanie Mills	20–26 May	Rebecca Atkinson	The daughter of Carol Mills, who Jason Grimshaw (Ryan Thomas) has a brief romance with after meeting her on the pier at Blackpool, while he is on holiday with his friend Kirk Sutherland (Andrew Whyment).
Timothy Spencer	3–10 July	Jonathan Wright	The son of Lillian Spencer (Maureen Lipman) who first appears in The Rovers Return Inn on 3 July 2002. He soon gets the job as cellar man at the pub after Lillian fires Jack Duckworth (Bill Tarmey). He subsequently leaves with Lillian and sister Danielle (Kelly Wenham), when Lillian gets another job offer.
Danielle Spencer	8–10 July	Kelly Wenham	The spoilt daughter of Lillian Spencer (Maureen Lipman). Her supposed job is as an aromatherapist but little evidence of this is seen in her brief stay in Coronation Street. Instead she is offered a job behind the bar by her mother with whom she is joined in vicious sniping sessions about the regulars of the pub, only showing any honesty when she and Lillian discuss how they had Fred Elliott (John Savident) wrapped around their fingers. Danielle leaves with her mother and brother after Lillian is offered a new job.
