= Maria Connor =

Fictional character from Coronation Street

- Coronation Street character
- Portrayed by: Samia Longchambon
- Duration: 2000–present
- First appearance: 19 May 2000
- Introduced by: Jane MacNaught
- Book appearances: Coronation Street: The Complete Saga (2008)
- Spin-off appearances: What Would Kirk Do? (2014–2015)
- Crossover appearances: EastEnders (2021); Hollyoaks (2021)
In-universe information
- Other names: Maria Sutherland
- Occupation: Kennel maid; Hairdresser; Barmaid; Personal assistant; Salon owner; Councillor
- Father: Eric Sutherland
- Mother: Dot Sutherland
- Brothers: Kirk Sutherland
- Husband: Liam Connor (2008); Pablo Duarte (2016–2017); Gary Windass (2020–present)
- Sons: Paul Connor Jr. Liam Connor Jr.
- Adoptive daughters: Kelly Neelan (ward)
- Stepsons: Jake Windass; Zack Rubinstein

Maria Connor (also Sutherland) is a fictional character from the British ITV soap opera Coronation Street, played by Samia Longchambon. The character made her first appearance during the episode broadcast on 19 May 2000. During her time on the show, Maria has been the centre of major storylines. In late-2009, Longchambon took maternity leave and Maria was off-screen from November 2009 until June 2010. Longchambon went on maternity leave again in 2015 and Maria was off-screen from October 2015 until April 2016.

== Casting ==
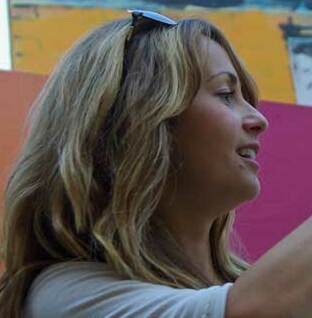
Samia Longchambon (pictured) auditioned for the role of Maria in 2000 and beat singers, Kimberley Walsh and Suzanne Shaw, for it.

Maria was created as a love interest for Tyrone Dobbs (Alan Halsall), and first appeared working as a kennel maid at her parents' kennels. Auditions were held for the role in 2000, and actress Samia Ghadie beat several rivals, including singers Kimberley Walsh (of Girls Aloud) and Suzanne Shaw (of Hear'Say), to win the part. Describing Maria's development as a character since her arrival on Coronation Street, the official website states: "Maria has blossomed from working as a kennel maid to one of the Street's most glamorous young women. She laps up the male attention that her good looks bring her but playing footloose and fancy-free with the men in her life has gained her a bit of a reputation." Jenny Cockle, writing for the Sunday Mirror, has similarly observed that during the character's duration on the show, Maria has evolved from a "dowdy kennel maid" to a "sexy siren". Reflecting on her early days at the programme, Ghadie said: "I thought I'd do my three months and then I'd be off. I was a jobbing actress when I joined and was really pleased to have a job for three months. I never imagined I'd still be here now." Since her arrival at Coronation Street Samia Smith has revealed that she will always be grateful for the opportunities she has been given since she joined.

In 2012, Ghadie revealed that she would like to stay at Coronation Street for another ten years, she said to OK! magazine: "I'd be very happy if I was still in Corrie in ten years' time. I think because of everything that has happened in the last few years I'm trying not to plan too much ahead. I am happy for each day". She also confirmed that she had signed another contract that would keep her in the show til September 2013. Ghadie revealed that it does not feel like she has been on the show for 12 years: "I'm 30 in July so it's quite scary, really! I was 17 when I joined so it just feels like my life is going really quickly! When I first joined, I was on a three-month contract. I thought I'd do my three months and then I'd be off. I was a jobbing actress when I joined and was really pleased to have a job for three months. I never imagined I'd still be here now, but I'm still really enjoying it. I think the show is going from strength to strength and it's got a brilliant mix of comedy and drama at the moment. For once, I'm involved in the lighter-hearted stuff, so that's nice!" In June 2019, it was announced that Longchambon had signed a new contract keeping her with the show for at least another 12 months.

== Development ==
=== Relationships ===
Discussing if Maria and Tyrone could get back together, she said: "She could save him from Kirsty, couldn't she? I really love working with Alan Halsall, who plays Tyrone, because he's like a brother in real life. I've known him forever so it's always good working with him, and I do love Maria and Tyrone scenes." Commenting on the relationship between Maria, Liam and Carla prior to Maria and Liam's wedding, Smith assessed: "I think Liam loves Maria but he is in lust with Carla."

Asked how she felt about Maria's romance with Tony Gordon, the man responsible for Liam's death, Smith commented: "It's freaked me out to be honest! It is a bit creepy, we can't deny that, considering everything that's happened between them! I think the writers have done a brilliant job in making it a slow burner and making it as realistic as possible to allow them to fall for each other. They have actually got quite a bit in common. They've both had their hearts broken by two people who they were very close to and considered the loves of their lives. Ultimately, they've forgotten everything that went on earlier this year with the accusations of murder and everything - that's all been brushed under the carpet.." Commenting on Maria's relationship with Tony, Smith said: "I think Maria genuinely loved Tony. I don't think she feels anything but hatred for him now. She's quite sad thinking about what might have been with him because she actually thought she'd got it all sussed - that she was going to be with him and he was going to be a father to Liam. Her world ended when she found out that he'd murdered her husband."

In 2012, Maria began a relationship with ex-boyfriend Jason Grimshaw played by Ryan Thomas, Thomas praised the plot: “She was one of the first girls he ever went out with. I think he's just done a big round circle and come back. It's been great, I've enjoyed working on it. They've got all the right qualities to last as a couple but you just do not know. Couples do not seem to last too long on Corrie and if they do, there's always things that get in the way of relationships in soaps, so we'll wait and see.” Ghadie revealed that filming the scenes with Thomas was more awkward than romantic as she and Thomas are good friends and revealed that it was like kissing your brother.

In October 2020, during an interview on Lorraine, Longchambon was asked about Maria's taste in men. Lorraine Kelly revealed the team had worked out Maria's "bodycount" over her 20 year span on the cobbles was 31 men, causing Longchambon to comment "My eyes are watering looking at that! I can't believe that! ... That's quite impressive, if that's the right word. I didn't know it was that many!"

=== Stillbirth ===
Discussing the scenes in which Maria give birth to a stillborn son, Smith described the research she put into filming the storyline to ensure authenticity: "It was so important that I got it right and it wasn't too overdramatic. They were both the hardest and easiest scenes I've ever had to do, because the situation was so sad. I was absolutely emotionally drained at the end of it all. The midwife has a lot of experience of attending stillbirths, and she helped me work out how to play it so that it seems real. It scared me personally, though, because the idea of going through something like that is petrifying. They were the most challenging scenes I've ever done."

On filming the delivery scene itself, she explained; "There was a prosthetic baby, but the director didn't show it to me until filming started so I'd get the full impact. It looked so real and I just broke down." Smith also gave the insight that filming the storyline affected her on a personal level, leading to the discovery her own mother had gone through the same situation: "Because of my mum, I wanted to do the scenes well but they left me feeling exhausted and drained. I know mum will be watching it at home, as will thousands of women who've been through it so I need to do it justice for them." In an interview for the Inside Soap Year book 2009, a point was made about the fact nothing nice seems to happen to the character and asked Samia about it, she replied "I'd love Maria to be happy for a change! I sometimes wonder if the Corrie scriptwriters think I've got a dodgy smile or something, because Maria hasn't smiled for months".

=== Frank Foster and attempted rape ===
In February 2011, It was reported that Kym Marsh who played Michelle Connor was to be written out due to her pregnancy, forcing re-writes to the script instead of Michelle, Maria became involved with Frank Foster (Andrew Lancel). It was reported that Maria would be a victim of a sexual attack by Frank; a Coronation Street source revealed: "Time will tell how bad Frank's character will be - but he's a ladies' man and no Weatherfield woman will be safe from his interest. Samia Smith revealed that the storyline would be very dramatic and there would be plenty of tears. Smith also revealed that Maria faces a horrible dilemma, she told All About Soap magazine: "She's absolutely terrified. He starts groping her all over and has his hand up her thigh. He basically tries to rape her but she manages to struggle out of his grip and runs from the house screaming and petrified." Smith noted that she was worried about offending people with the storyline: "A few years ago my first kind of hard-hitting storyline was when Maria had the stillborn baby and it sort of makes you really hyper-aware that other people have been through it, so you kind of want to do it justice. It's the same with this one really. Sexual assault is a very serious issue, so I want to do it justice and hopefully not offend people who have been sexually assaulted.

=== Caz Hammond ===
In August 2016, it was reported that Maria's current lodger Caz Hammond would hatch her most twisted plan yet as she uses Maria's recent encounter with a burglar to her own advantage. The incident leaves Maria with a nasty injury when she falls and hits her head as the intruder flees, but there's a coincidence when Caz soon shows up and rescues her. Caz deals with the situation perfectly as she tends to Maria's wound and calls the police to report the burglary, then agrees to stay over for the night to keep an eye on Maria. Rhea Bailey, who plays Caz, revealed: "Caz is just grateful that she can be there to mop up the aftermath and be a shoulder to cry on for Maria. In some twisted way, I think Caz feels like the hero. She just happened to be around the Street when Maria was burgled. She is sad that this meant Maria had to get hurt, but she's secretly really happy that she can be around and help Maria get over this."

=== Imprisonment ===
Maria marries Pablo, who is gay, in order for him to gain a visa. In December 2016, she was consequently imprisoned for 12 months. She was released from prison in March 2017.

== Storylines ==
Maria is first seen working in the kennels belonging to her father, Eric Sutherland (Steve Money). Tyrone Dobbs (Alan Halsall) and Jack Duckworth (Bill Tarmey) bring Tyrone's greyhound, Monica, in to look for a stud to mate with. Maria and Tyrone are immediately attracted to one another and the pair begin a relationship. Tyrone proposes to Maria at the top of Blackpool Tower and she happily accepts. However, their relationship quickly dissolves as Tyrone succumbs to his feelings for Fiz Brown (Jennie McAlpine), leading a heartbroken Maria to end their engagement.

Later, she romances Jason Grimshaw (Ryan Thomas). After deciding to change careers, she takes a hairdressing course. She is then hired by Audrey Roberts (Sue Nicholls) at the salon as a junior stylist but does not get along with Audrey or fellow stylist Maxine Peacock (Tracy Shaw). Audrey and Maria later form a close relationship over the years. Maria ends her romance with Jason after discovering that he had sex with Candice Stowe (Nikki Sanderson). She and her friend Toyah Battersby (Georgia Taylor) later move into the flat above the salon, having become good friends on a trip to Blackpool, where Maria saved Fiz from being arrested after Maria's brother Kirk Sutherland (Andrew Whyment), who had followed them on the trip with Fiz, Tyrone and Jason, broke into an empty caravan to find a place to stay without telling the others. Maria attends Gail Platt (Helen Worth) and Richard Hillman's (Brian Capron) wedding in July 2002, where she meets Gail's son Nick Tilsley (Adam Rickitt). Maria realises she has fallen in love with Nick and they embark on a romance. They decide to run away to Canada, with Maria turning Tyrone down when he comes to the airport to beg her to stay. Nick worked all hours, leaving a bored Maria home alone. She dumps him and returns soon after. Upon her return, she takes a job at the Rovers Return Inn and changes her image, becoming more promiscuous and fashion-conscious. Maria moves back into the flat where Fiz had moved in her absence. There is an uneasy truce between the former rivals for Tyrone's affection, especially since Fiz is now seeing Kirk and Maria is unhappy about her brother spending so much time in the flat, but the pair soon become close friends. Maria has a casual relationship with Vikram Desai (Chris Bisson) and is pleased when he takes her on holiday abroad, unaware he is merely using her as cover for drug smuggling to pay off his debts. When Steve McDonald (Simon Gregson) finds out what Vik is up to, he forces him to leave town without saying goodbye to Maria. In late-2002, Toyah arrives home with a new boyfriend, her tutor from college, John Arnley (Paul Warriner). Maria ends up having a one-night stand with John in January 2003 but is shocked when John wants nothing to do with her afterwards. Fiz discovers Maria and John's affair but keeps the secret. However, she struggles to conceal it when Maria announces she is pregnant. Maria later has an abortion but when Toyah finds out she slept with John, Maria denies responsibility, leading Toyah to believe John raped Maria and attacks him. When Toyah realises the truth, she refuses to forgive Maria and leaves Weatherfield, resulting in her family blaming Maria for driving her away.

Maria's sloppy work habits soon found her on the wrong side of her boss Shelley Unwin's (Sally Lindsay) mother Bev Unwin (Susie Blake). Even though Bev had goaded Maria into causing a scene while working, family loyalty wins out and Maria is sacked. She soon persuades Audrey to take her back on at the salon. She takes a dislike to fellow stylist, Candice, who took her ex-boyfriend Jason from her and who Audrey moves into the flat with her and Fiz, although they eventually become friends. She also shares with Claire Casey (Julia Haworth) for a time. In April 2004, Nick, another of Maria's ex-boyfriends, returns and the pair reconcile. However Nick's ex-wife Leanne Battersby (Jane Danson) returns months later, and after hearing what Maria had done to her stepsister Toyah, succeeds in splitting Nick and Maria. Nick leaves Weatherfield, taking a job in Nottingham. Maria stays on in the flat above Street Cars where she and Nick were living and Steve McDonald (Simon Gregson) moves his mother, Liz (Beverley Callard) into the flat in November 2004 as Maria's flatmate. She "borrows" £200 from the petty cash at the salon to go on holiday with her latest fling, Dave, and Tyrone lends her the money to pay it back before Audrey finds out. After Audrey tells her it is better to marry a good man who is loyal to you rather than go after looks, Maria reunites with Tyrone and the couple resumes dating in late-2004, with Maria moving in with Tyrone at No.9 Coronation Street. Even though she has a one-night stand with another man, Stuart (Junior Laniyan), they become engaged again. In 2005, Maria's parents relocate to Cyprus. Maria is disappointed that Eric intends to leave the kennel business to Kirk and persuades him to give her a half share but leaves all the work to Kirk. Kirk accidentally allows a pedigree bulldog to be gelded and has to sell the business to pay compensation to the owner, leaving himself and Maria with little profit. Maria and Tyrone later break up after she keeps trying to change his personality, giving him a back wax because she is embarrassed by his physique, and he discovers she does not love him as much as he loves her when she reacts with horror on having a pregnancy scare.

Maria begins renting the flat alongside the builder's yard from Charlie Stubbs (Bill Ward). Even though he is dating Tracy Barlow (Kate Ford), Charlie sets out to seduce Maria, installing security cameras at the yard to watch Maria's flat and staging a break-in to make her feel vulnerable. Maria falls for Charlie and begins an affair with him but when David Platt (Jack P. Shepherd) finds out and tries to blackmail Charlie, Charlie tries to drown him in Maria's bath. Maria stops him and admits the affair to Tracy, resulting in a fight between the two women in the street. Even though she wants nothing more to do with Charlie, Maria is the only resident aside from Jason to be upset when Tracy murders him in revenge for the affair.

Maria starts dating property developer Chris Pitcher but is disappointed to learn he considers her beneath him and is only interested in a casual relationship. Maria is reminded of the way she treated Tyrone and tries to resume her romance with him, even though he is now dating Molly Compton (Vicky Binns), but he turns her down. Maria later begins a relationship with Liam Connor (Rob James-Collier) and moves in with him. Maria finds that she is pregnant, and Liam proposes. Unknown to Maria, Liam has captured his sister-in-law Carla Connor's (Alison King) affections, which causes Maria some anxiety, but they still marry. Maria is horrified to realise that the baby has stopped kicking and an emergency scan shows that the baby has died. She delivers a stillborn baby boy who she names Paul after Liam's late brother, Paul Connor (Sean Gallagher) and Liam finds himself drawn to Carla. The secret lovers are discovered by Carla's fiancée Tony Gordon (Gray O'Brien) who has Liam murdered in a hit and run attack. The same night, Liam's sister, Michelle (Kym Marsh) realises Maria is pregnant again. Maria learns about Liam's affair when a drunken Sally Webster (Sally Dynevor) shows her video footage of Carla and Liam in each other's arms at Carla's wedding to Tony. The video was taken by her daughter, Rosie (Helen Flanagan). Maria becomes suspicious of Tony when she learns that he knew about the affair before marrying Carla and suspects he is involved in Liam's death. She begins a harassment campaign against Tony, who considers killing Maria to silence her. Maria almost runs Tony over in her late husband's car, in an attempt to mirror the way Liam was killed, causing him minor injuries, and he refuses to press charges against her.

Carla discovers Maria was right and flees Weatherfield, leaving Tony a broken man. When Maria finds Tony mourning at Liam's grave on her wedding anniversary, they call a truce and build a close friendship. When Maria goes into labour on a day trip to the beach, Tony delivers her baby, another boy that she names Liam Anthony Connor, after Liam and Tony. Tony suggested that she call him Sandy as he was born at a beach, but Maria was determined to name her son after his dad. Tony proposes to Maria and she accepts. Maria discovers the truth about Tony when he suffers a heart attack and confesses to Roy Cropper (David Neilson) that he had Liam murdered. Roy's wife Hayley (Julie Hesmondhalgh) informs a heartbroken Maria. She refuses to believe it but Tony admits it, causing Maria to have a breakdown and asks them to raise Liam but they make her realise that she has done nothing wrong and is a fit mother to Liam. They persuade her that she simply needs a change of scene so she and baby Liam go to Ireland with them.

Maria returns to Weatherfield in June 2010, announcing her intention to stay and moves into the salon flat with Liam and Kirk. The same month, Tony escapes from prison and with the help of a former cellmate's plans to kidnap Carla and Hayley in the Underworld factory. Robbie tricks Carla into entering the factory alone with her and holds her at gunpoint, tying her to a chair and taping her mouth shut. Robbie then tricks Hayley into coming to the factory, saying Carla has had an accident. Hayley sees Carla bound and gagged, but is held at gunpoint too and tied to a chair. Tony appears and announces his plans to kill them. Maria appears to see Carla, and Tony forces her to try and get rid of Maria. When Carla tries to warn Maria, Tony knocks her unconscious and pulls Maria into the hostage situation. Tony threatens to kill Maria if she tells anyone but she escapes and raises the alarm. Tony eventually lets Hayley go and sets fire to the factory to kill himself and Carla. However, Carla manages to untie herself and escapes, although Tony walks into the inferno and kills himself. Carla then offers Maria a job as a personal assistant at Underworld, and she agrees. Carla sends Maria to Frank Foster's (Andrew Lancel) house all dressed up for an informal meeting. Frank attempts to kiss Maria despite her telling him she has a boyfriend and when he doesn't stop, she begins panicking. When she tries to stand up from the sofa, Frank forces her back down, his hands wandering but she manages to fend him off. She escapes and rushes home crying and shaken. Over the next few weeks, Maria has to put up with Frank's appearances at Underworld, Maria informs Carla of what he did, but after numerous apologies, Frank agrees to business with the factory. Maria reaches breaking point when Carla announces that Frank has bought into the business and will be a new partner, she slaps Carla and quits her job after Carla says that Maria provoked the attack on herself. Having reached the end of her tether, Maria eventually reports Frank to the police. Frank is arrested the next day, but there is not enough evidence so the police do not press any charges. Maria then returns to her old job as a hairdresser at Audrey's Salon, alongside David and Audrey.

Maria receives a phone call from a distressed Carla, on the eve of her wedding to Frank, asking her to come over to her flat. Upon arrival, a shocked Maria finds Carla cowering on the floor, revealing that Frank has raped her. Maria puts her feud with Carla to one side and is immediately supportive, helping Carla as she reports the attack to the police. She supports Carla as she presses charges on Frank. Michelle returns from her cruise and the three sisters-in-law support Carla as Frank faces trial, he is found 'not guilty'. Maria later begins fawning over gay friend; Marcus Dent (Charlie Condou) and he moves in with her, after splitting from his then boyfriend Sean Tully (Antony Cotton). After constant complaining about being single, her friends decide to deceive her into reconciling with her ex-boyfriend, Jason. She has sex with him and they resume dating. Jason is preparing to move in with Maria until Maria discovers a lump on her breast, who confides in Marcus and after undergoing a biopsy, she learns that the lump is benign. After celebrating with Marcus, the pair share a surprise kiss, but later agree that it was a mistake. However, Maria later realises she is in love with Marcus but he is dating Aiden Lester (Toby Sawyer). Aiden receives a promotion, which is in London, and asks Maria whether Marcus will travel with him. Maria attempts to terminate the thought of moving to London as Marcus will stay. Although, the couple later notice her trickery and agree to leave for London, upsetting Maria. Marcus angrily confronts her at the flat and unable to contain his feelings, they sleep together but after their steamy session, he rejects her. The taxi arrives to take Aiden and Marcus but he refuses to leave, lying that he still loves Sean and ends his relationship with Aiden, leading a heartbroken Aiden to leave for the capital alone. Marcus stuns Maria when she sees him still at the flat and after revealing he is in love with her, they kiss and start casually dating. She later declares to Jason that their relationship is over.

In late-2013, Marcus and Maria decide that they want to buy a house together, away from the street, so that there are things like boating lakes and playgrounds for Liam. After viewing a chain of properties, Marcus and Maria finally find a place with all the amenities that they were looking for. Marcus then decides to surprise Maria at the show home, and as he waits for her, their gay friend Todd Grimshaw (Bruno Langley) accompanies Marcus, but the pair end up having sex. Maria and her friend Audrey walk in on them, which leaves Marcus horrified and embarrassed. As Marcus tries to explain himself to Maria and put things right with her, she lashes out, attacks him, and ends their relationship for good. Maria kicks Marcus out of their flat, but Maria is annoyed when he is offered a room at Todd's aunt Julie's flat. When Liam's childminder falls sick, and Maria does not answer her phone, Marcus decides to pick Liam up from the childminder's house, as no one else can. After picking Liam up, Marcus brings him back to the salon to meet Maria. Marcus tries to tell Maria that he is going to London for a short time, and Maria tells him that she wants nothing else to do with him. When Marcus returns, Maria was furious. After finding out that Tyrone's ex-fiancée Kirsty Soames (Natalie Gumede) has been released from prison, Maria comforts Tyrone and decided to try to rekindle their relationship by sending texts, pretending to be Kirsty (with the letter "K" at the end). Tyrone and Fiz's relationship starts to strain because of the texts and Fiz calling the police on her. When Maria gets Tyrone to herself for half an hour on the bench, she sees Fiz and deliberately hugs him in the hope that Fiz will dump him. Fiz moves out of Tyrone's house and moves back in with her brother Chesney. The next day, the police come knocking to Fiz and she found out that Kirsty is abroad and there is proof that the messages have come from the UK. Confused, Fiz rings the number and Tyrone picks it up and realizes that Maria was behind it all along. Maria tries to explain that she loves Tyrone and desperately tries to convince him that he feels the same, but a furious Tyrone pushes her away and tells her to stay away from them. The next day, Tyrone and Fiz call the police and Maria is arrested. The police then say that whatever happens next is up to Tyrone and Fiz. After some persuasion from Kirk, they decide to drop the charges. Maria then decides to take Liam to Cyprus for a while, so that he can spend a bit of time with his grandparents.

Maria returns on 30 June, saying that being away helped her come to terms with what happened with Marcus and has helped her overall mental health. She and Kirk go to the Rovers for a drink where they bump into Fiz. Maria tries to apologise to Fiz for sending the texts to Tyrone and for frightening them. Fiz tells Maria that she will never forgive her for what she did. Marcus comes to Maria's defence and tells Fiz that Maria was obviously not well when she was doing those things and was therefore not herself. Marcus later catches Todd kissing another man to which had stayed the night before at Todd's house. Marcus is horrified and realises what Todd is really like. Marcus then dumps Todd and Maria comforts him. Marcus later leaves Weatherfield departing on good terms with Maria.

She later begins a relationship with mechanic Luke Britton (Dean Fagan). Maria is initially reluctant to commit to Luke. He later accompanies her to a wedding and they begin a serious relationship. Maria also likes Luke as he gets along well with Liam. Maria later gets into an argument with Jenny Bradley (Sally Ann Matthews) and is stunned when Jenny slaps her. She is later annoyed when Jenny denies hitting her, however, Sophie Webster (Brooke Vincent) believes Maria. She later buys Luke a stock racing car as a gift. He restores the car as it is not in good condition and later begins racing the car. She regrets buying him the racing car after she realises it could put his life in danger as he previously had an accident before he met Maria. Luke agrees to give up racing, but continues to race in secret. Maria later finds out that Luke is still racing the car after Norris Cole (Malcolm Hebden) lets slip that he saw Luke loading the car onto a trailer, while assumed to be working by Maria. Maria is furious when she finds out and later gives Luke an ultimatum either he gives up the racing or they're over. Luke later agrees to give up racing the car but is later blackmailed by his friend and sister's ex-boyfriend, Jamie Bowman (James Atherton) over naked photos he has of Luke's sister, Steph Britton (Tisha Merry). Maria later leaves the street for Cyprus in order to help her father Eric, look after her mother who has had an accident. Maria returns in April 2016 and it becomes obvious she is keeping a secret, whilst at the salon she takes a phone call from a man called Pablo, who she has married, Audrey later spots them kissing after he turns up outside her flat however Maria later reveals she only married Pablo to keep him in the country as he has a boyfriend living in the UK. In July 2016, she invites Caz Hammond (Rhea Bailey) to come and live with her and Luke which he becomes jealous by. Maria later has sex with Aidan Connor (Shayne Ward), who is dating Eva Price (Catherine Tyldesley) and still wants to continue the affair but Aidan doesn't as he has heard the Fiz calling her 'Mad Maria' and the factory girls saying that she's crazy. They are nearly caught out after Caz accidentally mentions that she saw Aidan in the flat the night before whereas he had told a lie to Eva. Eva questioned them both and Maria makes up that Aidan is looking at flats for her. This irritates Aidan as he doesn't want to move in with her and he and Maria argue. Maria then ends her engagement with Luke, which also devastates him. Later on back at the flat, Caz tells Liam that Maria and Luke are no longer together which infuriates Maria. Caz questions Maria whether she and Aidan had something going on and Maria orders Caz out. After Maria manages to get Caz a job interview Caz kisses her, Maria then tells Audrey and Sophie about the kiss and Caz overhears this and leaves the street. Maria and Sophie, however, go after her and manage to bring her back.

In October 2016, Caz tells Tyrone that Maria is threatening her to get out of the flat and goes missing framing Maria for "murdering her" by putting blood on the walls, Maria is questioned by the police however the rest of the street including Tyrone back Maria but Caz is nowhere to be seen. Tyrone and Fiz later find Maria's rug with blood stains on in the bin and tell the police, the police question Maria. After coming back from the police station Maria and Aidan hug unaware that Caz is watching in the distance. Maria later goes into the pub whilst everyone is talking about her and lashes out at pregnant Michelle Connor. Caz cuts herself in Maria's flat and wipes the blood on Maria's hairdressing scissors. Maria later finds these and with Aidan's help they dispose of them. However, Aidan's father Johnny Connor (Richard Hawley) finds them and alerts the police, which leads to Maria being arrested. Maria is released after Aidan's sister and Caz's ex-girlfriend Kate Connor (Faye Brookes) leads Caz to believe she wants her back and rings the police. Aidan goes to pick Maria up from the police station and they nearly kiss. Aidan then later confesses that he loves Maria despite his relationship with Eva. However, on Christmas Eve, Maria is sentenced to twelve months imprisonment for illegally marrying Pablo.

In March 2017, she is released from prison for good behaviour but with an electronic tracking device on her ankle. She reunites and clashes with Toyah due to their feud fourteen years earlier. In May 2017, she accompanies Aidan to a business lunch where she pretends to be Eva however she needs to get home before her curfew ends and storms out of the restaurant after an argument with Aidan. She is seen walking alongside the road by Aidan who tempts her into his car for a lift home as she doesn't want to go back to prison. Once they get back to Maria's just in time before her curfew ends they have sex and afterwards she tells him he can stay with Eva and that they can carry on having an affair behind her back but Maria is heartbroken when he and Eva get engaged, and although at first she insists their affair is over; Maria carries on secretly meeting Aidan. He ends the affair once Eva tells Aidan she is pregnant. Eva annoys Maria and asks her to plan her wedding. Eva starts humiliating Maria at her hen party, where she learns that Eva has lied about her pregnancy when Maria finds her fake baby scans. After lying saying she cannot go to the wedding, Maria sneaks to the hotel instead and puts a picture of the fake scans in the guests gift bags, however after being locked in the bathroom by Toyah, Maria manages to be let out by hotel staff and storms into the ceremony exposing Eva's fake pregnancy to Aidan and the rest of the wedding guests.

Eva desperately tries to deny it, but eventually admits that she found out about the affair months ago. Despite her attempts to shame him and Maria, Aidan is disgusted with her deception and storms out of the wedding ceremony. Whilst outside, Eva attacks Maria and the pair end up in a fountain until they are eventually broken up by Kirk. A few days later, Aidan makes a move on Maria following his break up with Eva but she rebuffs him, saying he's not allowed to pick and choose. Aidan commits suicide in May 2018 and Maria is devastated, especially after how close he became with Liam in his final weeks, including giving him his watch to look after.

Maria falls out with Audrey when she refuses to give her any independence at work, and eventually, a heated argument leads to Maria quitting her job at the salon. She is approached by Audrey's competitor, Claudia Colby (Rula Lenska), who offers Maria the chance to invest in and run her own salon which she quickly agrees to. Maria struggles to raise the funds for the investment and is surprised when Rita Tanner (Barbara Knox) offers her the money in return for a share of the profits. Maria celebrates with Claudia, Rita and her new housemate Emma Brooker (Alexandra Mardell), whom she had just offered a room to. Maria eventually pulls out of the deal when Claudia attempts to cruelly humiliate Audrey at the annual Hair Salon Awards, which had resulted in a drunken Audrey throwing flowers at Claudia. She has a heart-to-heart with Audrey where she tells Maria that she has always been like a daughter to her, and they make up with the agreement that Maria would become a partner in the salon.

In December 2019, she discovers she’s pregnant with Gary Windass’ (Mikey North) baby, only to have a miscarriage soon after. They marry the following year and take in Kelly Neelan (Millie Gibson) as their foster daughter.

== Reception ==
In 2006, the character won the Inside Soap 'Best Dressed' accolade. Grace Dent, writing for The Guardian, has been highly critical of Maria during her time on the show. In February 2006, she highlighted the unlikeliness of Maria's relationship with Tyrone Dobbs is very romantic, writing: "Maria Sutherland is one of those shiny, lithe, capricious, tidily-kept hairdresser girls who flutter around the Trafford Centre's Karen Millen store on Saturdays, trying on sparkly halter frocks, dreaming about snaring Rio Ferdinand. Tyrone Dobbs, on the other hand, looks like one of the Flumps." Following the death of Charlie Stubbs in January 2007, she deemed Maria to be the Street's "local loose-knickered simpleton", and has also referred to her as being "such a tit", and "a pretty, perky, easily beddable dimwit". A writer from TV Magazine noted that most of Maria's men end up dead and quipped "Maria is the Street's unlikely black widow and her men often have a bleak future." In August 2017, Longchambon was longlisted for Best Bad Girl at the Inside Soap Awards. She did not progress to the viewer-voted shortlist. She was also longlisted for "Best Actress" at the 2024 Inside Soap Awards.
