= Ashley Peacock =

Fictional character from Coronation Street

- Coronation Street character
- Portrayed by: Steven Arnold
- Duration: 1995–2010
- First appearance: Episode 3812; 1 February 1995
- Last appearance: Episode 7489; 10 December 2010
- Introduced by: Sue Pritchard (1995); Brian Park (1996)
In-universe information
- Occupation: Butcher; Businessman
- Father: Fred Elliott
- Mother: Kathleen Gutteridge
- Adoptive father: Sam Peacock
- Adoptive mother: Beryl Peacock
- Stepmother: Maureen Holdsworth
- Wife: Maxine Heavey (1999–2003); Claire Casey (2004–2010)
- Sons: Freddie Peacock
- Adoptive sons: Joshua Peacock
- Grandfathers: William Elliott
- Grandmothers: Amelia Elliott

Ashley Peacock is a fictional character from the British ITV soap opera Coronation Street. Played by Steven Arnold, the character first appeared on screen during the episode airing on 1 February 1995. Ashley was a victim of the tram crash and died as part of the show's 50th-anniversary episode in December 2010.

== Development ==
=== Departure ===
The Peacocks' (Ashley, his wife Claire, and his children Joshua and Freddie) departure tied in with the show's 50th anniversary celebrations. The anniversary episode was broadcast live on 9 December 2010, with Ashley being killed off in an explosion, taking place at The Joinery, which caused a tram to derail onto the street. The character made his final ever appearance on the programme on 10 December 2010, ending his fifteen-year association on the soap.

Following his departure, Arnold claimed that he believed his character's death was a result of his "boozing" and "bad time-keeping", which resulted in him receiving multiple warnings over his lack of professionalism.

== Storylines ==
=== Backstory ===
Ashley is the son of Fred Elliott (John Savident) and Kathleen Gutteridge (Elizabeth Rider). He was conceived when his father had a relationship with Kathleen, who was an employee at his family's shop. Fred proposed to Kathleen, wanting to provide stability for his son, but Kathleen rejected his proposal as she did not want to be tied down at a young age. When Ashley was born, Kathleen agreed to let Fred's sister Beryl Peacock (Anny Tobin) and her husband Sam, raise Ashley as their own son. Ashley grew up believing Fred was his uncle and Beryl was his mother.

=== 1995–2010 ===
Ashley is first seen doing bicycle deliveries for his father, Fred, from his butcher's shop. Fred sends Ashley to Rita Sullivan (Barbara Knox) with a parcel of rump steak. Rita doesn't want it as she doesn't want to be obligated to Fred. Jamie does his puncture trick on Ashley's bike and is paid again. Kelly Thomson (Sarah Moffett) is pleased to see Ashley, her old school friend. She gives him a cup of tea and is pleased to discover that he's not going out with anyone. She tells him that his old girlfriend Margaret was two-timing him all the time. She is embarrassed when Sally Webster (Sally Dynevor) matchmakes between them. Ashley and Kelly arrange to have a date in The Rovers, both terribly shy of actually asking the other out. Ashley feels bold enough to kiss Kelly but runs off in case Fred catches him. Ashley tells Judy that Fred intends to sell the horse for horsemeat. Ashley and Kelly plan to spend the night together at No.1 in Ken Barlow's (William Roache) absence. Ashley spends the night with Kelly at No.1. Emily Bishop (Eileen Derbyshire) sees Ashley leaving No.1 in the morning and realises that he spent the night with Kelly. Ken returns from the course to find Ashley wearing his dressing gown. Emily is annoyed when Ashley accuses her of telling Ken about him staying the night with Kelly. Emily tells Ken that she's not going to tell tales on Kelly but admits Ashley stayed the night. Kelly and Ashley have to cancel an evening out in Blackpool as Ken has an emergency meeting. Ashley tells Kelly that Ken puts on her, but she accuses him of being selfish. Ashley apologises to Kelly and tells her that he's fed up as they never get any privacy. Ashley asks for time off as he has enteritis. However, Fred discovers that he's helping Kelly move into Ken's house. A row ensues, and Ashley gets fired. Ashley refuses to make amends with Fred. Kelly asks Rita to persuade Fred to take Ashley back, as Ashley's too scared to approach Fred. Rita asks Fred to give Ashley a second chance, but he tells her to let him run his business his way. She is put out. Rita explains to Kelly that she had no luck with Fred in getting Ashley's job back. Fred reinstates Ashley.

After his relationship with Kelly ends, Ashley is involved in an on-off relationship with Maxine Heavey (Tracy Shaw). Eventually, Maxine moves in with Ashley at No.4 - Fred's house. When teenage runaway Zoe Tattersall (Joanne Froggatt) comes to Coronation Street, Ashley feels sorry for her and allows her to move in, but Maxine is uncomfortable with the arrangement and leaves. Eventually, Ashley falls in love with Zoe and sets out to be a provider for her and her baby daughter, Shannon. In 1999, Ashley and Maxine get back together, and finally marry in September. Ashley also finds out that his uncle, Fred, is actually his biological father. Fred tells Ashley about Kathleen and her reluctance to be a mother at a young age.

In January 2003, Maxine is murdered by Richard Hillman (Brian Capron), leaving Ashley devastated. At Maxine's funeral, her boss Audrey Roberts (Sue Nicholls) causes a scene and accuses Richard of murdering Maxine and attempting to kill her and Emily. Later at the wake in The Rovers', Ashley is very angry with Audrey and does not accept her apology. However, he accepts the support of Audrey's daughter, Gail (Helen Worth), Richard's wife. Ashley is further devastated when a blood test confirms that Matt Ramsden (Stephen Beckett), who Maxine had a one-night stand with, is the biological father of Maxine's son Joshua, whom Ashley is raising.

Ashley realises that he needs help looking after Joshua and hires a nanny, Claire Casey (Julia Haworth). Ashley and Claire bond over Joshua, and they eventually fall in love. In October 2004, Ashley proposes to Claire in The Rovers and she accepts. They get married on Christmas Day 2004.

In August 2005, Ashley participates in a boxing match with another butcher, Marvin Maddocks, son of Eddie Maddocks, one of Fred's business rivals. After Fred discovers the Maddocks' have put up a poster criticising his and Ashley's meat, he confronts Eddie, wanting revenge, and Eddie suggests a boxing match between their sons. Ashley is scared due to Marvin being a featherweight amateur boxing champion but agrees to go ahead with the fight. When Claire expresses her concerns, Ashley attempts to call it off but changes his mind again after Marvin confronts him and insults Claire. When the boxing match takes place, Fred and Eddie start insulting each other again and Claire gets into a fight with one of Marvin's supporters. After a fight breaks out in the audience, Ashley and Marvin decide to diffuse the situation by calling the match a draw.

On their first wedding anniversary in December 2005, Claire tells Ashley that she is pregnant. Their son Thomas is born on 17 July 2006. Around the same time, Matt contacts Ashley and demands access to Joshua. Ashley refuses, and the matter goes to court. Eventually, Claire persuades Ashley to make Matt an offer of limited access, which he accepts, but ends up delivering Claire's baby when she goes into labour and congratulates Ashley on becoming a father himself. Ashley supports Claire when she suffers from post-natal depression and is sectioned after trying to kill Thomas. Ashley stands by Claire during her ordeal, and they reconcile when she is allowed home. After Fred dies later that year, Thomas is renamed 'Freddie' in his honour.

On 10 November 2008, Ashley employs Graeme Proctor (Craig Gazey) at his shop following the teenager's release from a Young Offenders Institution, and he and Ashley form a close bond and friendship. Since Autumn 2009, Ashley developed a friendship with Steve McDonald (Simon Gregson) due to Claire's newly developed friendship with Steve's wife, Becky (Katherine Kelly).

On 6 December 2010, Ashley attends Peter Barlow's (Chris Gascoyne) stag night at The Joinery Bar. Ashley gets drunk and decides to go home. He goes into the office to say goodbye to Peter. He wishes Peter well and tells him never to turn his back on his fiancée Leanne Battersby (Jane Danson). He also asks Peter to come and visit himself and Claire in France once they have settled down, and the two men embrace. An explosion then tears through The Joinery, severing the overhead railway line and derailing a tram. Ashley is trapped in the office with Peter and the bar manager Nick Tilsley (Ben Price). He then helps Nick free Peter, who is buried under debris and badly injured. Ashley tries to search for a way out and realises he is seriously injured when he coughs up blood. He then tries to call Claire but gets no reply. He leaves a message on her phone telling her that he loves her and is looking forward to going to France with her and the boys. Ashley and Nick then manage to carry Peter to a hole in the wall after hearing firefighters call out to them. The roof starts to collapse, and Ashley is trapped but holds the ceiling up long enough for Nick to pass Peter out to safety. Nick offers to stay behind and help Ashley but realising it is too late to save himself, Ashley shouts at Nick to get out and save himself. The roof then gives way, and Ashley is crushed to death. Claire then listens to the voicemail that Ashley left her whilst he was trapped in the joinery.

A distraught Claire then goes with Graeme to identify Ashley's body at the morgue. Ashley's funeral was held on 16 December 2010, off-screen.

== Reception ==
For his portrayal of Ashley, Arnold was nominated in the category of "Most Popular Actor" at the 1999 National Television Awards. Steven Arnold was nominated in the category of Best Actor at the Inside Soap Awards. In 2024, Katie Timms Megan Shaw and Mia O'Hare called Ashley an "iconic Weatherfield butcher" and joked that Arnold must have been "inspired" by Ashley's profession due to him becoming a butcher in real life. Lucy Lather from Inside Soap included Ashley and his wife Claire's (Julia Haworth) relationship in a feature profiling negatively received storylines. Lather believed Ashley needed to romance another "firecracker" type character like his first wife Maxine (Tracy Shaw) and stated "could their be a duller couple?".
