= List of Coronation Street characters introduced in 1999 =

The following is a list of characters that first appeared in the ITV soap opera Coronation Street in 1999, by order of first appearance.

== Ian Bentley ==
Ian Bentley, played by Jonathan Guy Lewis, first appeared on 29 January 1999. He is introduced as the fiancé of Sharon Gaskell (Tracie Bennett). Ian begins an affair with the recently widowed Natalie Barnes (Denise Welch). Sharon discovers the affair, but intends to marry Ian regardless, dismissing the affair as one last fling. However, during the service, Sharon calls Ian a liar and jilts him. Months later, after Sharon attempts suicide, she calls Ian and the pair decide to reconcile their relationship. When Sharon returns in 2021, she reveals to Rita Tanner (Barbara Knox) that she and Ian have since divorced due to Ian's infidelity.

== Jessica Lundy ==
Jessica Lundy
- Coronation Street character
- Portrayed by: Olwen May
- Duration: 1999–2000
- First appearance: 30 March 1999
- Last appearance: 4 August 2000
- Introduced by: David Hanson
In-universe information
- Occupation: Pastor

The Reverend Jessica Lundy, portrayed by Olwen May, was a pastor who was best known for officiating at the wedding Hayley Patterson (Julie Hesmondhalgh) and Roy Cropper (David Neilson), despite it being illegal due to Hayley being transsexual. Les Battersby (Bruce Jones) almost made the wedding a failure as he ran into the church and protested.

Jessica next appeared as the pastor to christen baby Bethany Platt (Amy and Emily Walton); Hayley and Bethany's teenage mother Sarah-Louise's (Tina O'Brien) best mate Candice Stowe (Nikki Sanderson) were godmothers and Roy was godfather. Bethany's uncle David (Jack P. Shepherd) was intending to be godfather, but he jealously did a runner from the church. The christening party was also ruined when Candice's mother Marion (Paula Simms) turned up and angrily dragged her daughter away, and David turned up in a police car as he was caught shoplifting.

Jessica's surname was credited in her first two appearances, but on her last appearance, her first name was revealed.

== Nita Desai ==
Nita Desai
- Coronation Street character
- Portrayed by: Rebecca Sarker
- Duration: 1999–2000
- First appearance: 8 January 1999
- Last appearance: 19 May 2000
In-universe information
- Father: Ravi Desai
- Brothers: Vikram Desai
- Aunts: Urmila Alahan
- First cousins: Dev Alahan
- Other relatives: Amber Kalirai; Aadi Alahan; Asha Alahan

Nita Desai, played by Rebecca Sarker, arrives in January as a new assistant at the Corner Shop, which her family later take over.

Nita managed the shop for her father Ravi (Saeed Jaffrey) when he bought it from Fred Elliott (John Savident), living in the flat above. After just four months, Nita, craving independence, left the family business to climb the managerial ladder at Freshco supermarket. She spent a year as assistant manager at the Weatherfield branch before, in 2000, leaving the street for Inverness to run her own store.

== Ravi Desai ==
Ravi Desai
- Coronation Street character
- Portrayed by: Saeed Jaffrey
- First appearance: 22 January 1999
- Last appearance: 8 August 1999
In-universe information
- Brothers: Raj Desai; Sanjeet Desai
- Sisters: Urmila Alahan
- Sons: Vikram Desai
- Daughters: Nita Desai
- Nephews: Dev Alahan
- Other relatives: Amber Kalirai; Aadi Alahan; Asha Alahan

Ravi Desai took over the management of the Corner Shop on Coronation Street in January 1999. Played by actor Saeed Jaffrey, Ravi left Weatherfield due to family issues later in the year, and sold his empire of corner shops in the area to his nephew, Dev Alahan (Jimmi Harkishin). In June 2019, Dev receives a phone call and learns that Ravi is dying and he takes his children Aadi and Asha to see him in India. However, when Dev returns in August, he reveals Ravi is still alive and well.

== Darren Dobbs ==
Darren Dobbs
- Coronation Street character
- Portrayed by: James McMartin (1999); Stephen Donald (2018)
- Duration: 1999, 2018
- First appearance: 26 January 1999
- Last appearance: 5 September 2018
- Introduced by: David Hanson (1999); Kate Oates (2018)
In-universe information
- Wife: Jackie Dobbs
- Adoptive sons: Tyrone Dobbs
- Granddaughters: Ruby Dobbs (adoptive)

Darren Dobbs is the father of Tyrone Dobbs (Alan Halsall) who appears in March 1999 to take his wife Jackie (Margi Clarke) home to Liverpool. Darren made a return in September 2018 to tie in with ex-wife Jackie's death among Darren's return he had revealed to Tyrone that he and Jackie weren't actually Tyrone's real parents.

== Vikram Desai ==
Vikram Desai
- Coronation Street character
- Portrayed by: Chris Bisson
- Duration: 1999–2002
- First appearance: 7 February 1999
- Last appearance: 18 December 2002
In-universe information
- Occupation: Shopkeeper; Taxi Service co-owner
- Father: Ravi Desai
- Sisters: Nita Desai
- Aunts: Urmila Alahan
- First cousins: Dev Alahan
- Other relatives: Amber Kalirai; Aadi Alahan; Asha Alahan

Vikram Desai was played by Chris Bisson. Vikram is Dev Alahan's (Jimmi Harkishin) cousin and he used to own the shop with Dev and worked with Sunita Parekh (Shobna Gulati). During his time in Weatherfield, he dated Leanne Battersby (Jane Danson) and Maria Sutherland (Samia Ghadie). In 2000, he briefly dated Candice Stowe (Nikki Sanderson) but he later learns that she is under the age of consent. In 2002, he was forced to smuggle drugs in from abroad again, but this time he asked Steve (Simon Gregson) and Karen McDonald (Suranne Jones) if they wanted a free holiday and they accepted. When they came back Steve discovered powder at the bottom of his suitcase and inside was drugs, and he found out that Vikram had done it. Karen was horrified as well as Steve and he dumped the drugs in the canal and told Vikram to leave Weatherfield for good, and if he comes back Steve said he will kill him. He now lives in India.

Vikram was mentioned when Sunita's aunts came to stay in 2010, after Dev said that they were even worse than him. In 2021, Vikram's name was seen among Aadi Alahan's (Adam Hussain) Xbox Live contacts. In 2025, Vikram was mentioned by Dev when he plans to send Aadi to live with him in India.

== Tom Ferguson ==
Tom Ferguson
- Coronation Street character
- Portrayed by: Tom Wisdom
- Duration: 1999–2000
- First appearance: 3 March 1999
- Last appearance: 28 January 2000
In-universe information
- Father: Duggie Ferguson
- Mother: Laura Ferguson

Tom Ferguson, played by actor Tom Wisdom, is the son of Duggie Ferguson (John Bowe), who arrives later in the year. Tom is a hairdresser, and worked at Audrey Roberts' (Sue Nicholls) salon until he quit in January 2000 and left Weatherfield to get away from his father.

== Boris Weaver ==
Boris Weaver
- Coronation Street character
- Portrayed by: Mark Hallet
- Duration: 1999–2004
- First appearance: 5 April 1999
- Last appearance: 26 December 2004
- Introduced by: David Hanson (1999); Jane MacNaught (2000–02); Kieran Roberts (2003); Tony Wood (2004)
In-universe information
- Occupation: Butcher

Boris Weaver was a butcher who worked for Ashley Peacock (Steven Arnold) at Elliott and Sons butchers. Boris appeared for the first time in 1999 and appeared recurrently and made his last appearance at Christmas 2004, at Ashley's wedding to Claire Casey (Julia Haworth). From then on, Boris was still referred to and looked after the shop when Ashley was away. In later years both Kirk Sutherland (Andrew Whyment) and Graeme Proctor (Craig Gazey) successively worked for Ashley at the shop, it is assumed that Boris was no longer an employee there.

== Danny Hargreaves ==
Danny Hargreaves
- Coronation Street character
- Portrayed by: Richard Standing
- Duration: 1999–2001
- First appearance: 28 April 1999
- Last appearance: 22 April 2001
In-universe information
- Brothers: Kieran Hargreaves

Danny Hargreaves is played by Richard Standing between 1999 and 2001. A market trader, Danny meets Sally Webster (Sally Dynevor) at work and begins a relationship with her. Danny and Sally fell in love and got engaged, but he jilted her on their wedding day after discovering that Sally had a one-night stand with ex-husband Kevin (Michael Le Vell).

== Beryl Peacock ==
Beryl Peacock
- Coronation Street character
- Portrayed by: Anny Tobin
- Duration: 1999, 2003–2004, 2006
- First appearance: 28 May 1999
- Last appearance: 20 October 2006
In-universe information
- Father: William Elliott
- Mother: Amelia Elliott
- Brothers: Fred Elliott
- Husband: Sam Peacock
- Adoptive sons: Ashley Peacock
- Grandsons: Freddie Peacock (adoptive)
- Grandfathers: Bernard Cartwright
- Grandmothers: Alice Cartwright
- Other relatives: Freddie Peacock

Beryl Hayden Peacock (also Elliott) is the sister of Fred Elliott (John Savident). Beryl and her husband Sam had raised Fred's son, Ashley Peacock (Steven Arnold), as their own. Beryl first appeared when Ashley asked her for the truth about his parentage and she was forced to tell Ashley that she was actually his aunt, not his mother. Beryl made her most recent appearance at Fred's funeral in October 2006.

Beryl did not attend Ashley's funeral when he died in a tram crash in December 2010.

== Belinda Peach ==
Belinda Peach
- Coronation Street character
- Portrayed by: Maxine Peake
- First appearance: 20 June 1999
- Last appearance: 25 June 1999
In-universe information
- Occupation: guest]]

Belinda Peach, portrayed by Maxine Peake, appears briefly at the Freshco's Summer Ball where she tries to woo Ashley Peacock (Steven Arnold). Ashley is amused by Fred Elliott's (John Savident) attempts to pair him with Belinda, despite him attending with Maxine Heavey (Tracy Shaw). Maxine gets annoyed by Belinda's overly friendly manner and pushes her in the direction of Curly Watts (Kevin Kennedy).

== Lee Sankley ==
Lee Sankley
- Coronation Street character
- Portrayed by: Stephen Graham
- First appearance: 23 June 1999
- Last appearance: 3 September 1999
In-universe information
- Occupation: Drug dealer

Lee Sankley, portrayed by Stephen Graham, was a drug dealer who worked with Steve McDonald (Simon Gregson) selling tobacco in Weatherfield. He told Steve that the area was his patch, however when Steve recognised Lee as an ex-convict, he began to sell tobacco to him cheap from No. 11, however when his father, Jim McDonald (Charles Lawson) arrived home, he discovered this and threw Lee out of his house. Lee was later arrested and Jez Quigley (Lee Boardman) took his place as the local dealer. Jez was later arrested for the murder of Tony Horrocks (Lee Warburton) and Lee gave evidence at his trial.

== Doreen Heavey ==
Doreen Heavey
- Coronation Street character
- Portrayed by: Prunella Gee
- Duration: 1999, 2002–2004
- First appearance: 2 July 1999
- Last appearance: 8 November 2004
In-universe information
- Husband: Derek Heavey (until 2002)
- Daughters: Maxine Peacock
- Grandsons: Joshua Peacock

Doreen Heavey (also Outhwaite) is the mother of Maxine Peacock (Tracy Shaw), played by actress Prunella Gee, who had three spells on the Street between 1999 and 2004; the third of these covering the period of her daughter's death at the hands of Richard Hillman (Brian Capron) in early 2003, after which she moved back in with her ex-husband Derek, Maxine's father, in order to give their relationship another go. Doreen was last seen in November 2004 when she, Ashley Peacock (Steven Arnold) and her grandson Joshua (Benjamin Beresford) went to lay flowers on Maxine's grave on what would have been her 29th birthday. She told Ashley that she liked his new fiancée Claire Casey (Julia Haworth) and gave him her blessing to marry Claire.

== Derek Heavey ==
Derek Heavey
- Coronation Street character
- Portrayed by: Richard Albrecht
- Duration: 1999, 2002–2003
- First appearance: 2 July 1999
- Last appearance: 31 January 2003
In-universe information
- Occupation: Truck Driver
- Husband: Doreen Heavey (until 2002)
- Daughters: Maxine Peacock
- Grandsons: Joshua Peacock

Derek Heavey is the father of Maxine Peacock (Tracy Shaw), who had three spells on the Street between 1999 and 2003; the third of these covering the period of her daughter's death at the hands of Richard Hillman (Brian Capron). His marriage to Maxine's mother, Doreen Heavey (Prunella Gee) wasn't a happy one and ended up leaving her for another woman in 2002. After Maxine's death, Derek and Doreen reconciled.

== Melanie Tindel ==
Melanie Tindel
- Coronation Street character
- Portrayed by: Nicola Wheeler
- First appearance: 7 July 1999
- Last appearance: 29 October 1999

Melanie Tindel, portrayed by Nicola Wheeler, was a school friend of Maxine Heavey (Tracy Shaw) whom she asked to do her her for her wedding, which was subsequently cancelled. Maxine however quickly stepped in when the church booking became vacant. Melanie agreed to be her bridesmaid at her wedding to butcher, Ashley Peacock (Steven Arnold). At the bridal suite, Melanie had a fling with Tom Ferguson (Tom Wisdom), which became an affair until Tom broke it off a month later.

== Vinny Sorrell ==
Vinny Sorrell
- Coronation Street character
- Portrayed by: James Gaddas
- Duration: 1999–2000
- First appearance: 2 August 1999
- Last appearance: 10 November 2000
In-universe information
- Daughters: Lisa Scott; Laura Barnes

Vinny Sorrell, played by James Gaddas, appeared for a period of 15 months between 1999 and 2000. He has an on/off relationship with Natalie Barnes (Denise Welch) throughout, and works alongside her at The Rovers Return Inn as a barman and cellarman. Vinny departs Weatherfield in November 2000 after his affair with Natalie's sister Debs Brownlow (Gabrielle Glaister) is revealed. Vinny moves to Southampton with Debs where she gets a new job. Unbeknownst to Vinny, Natalie is pregnant with his child and she gives birth to their daughter, Laura, off-screen in 2001. Gaddas had previously played Robert Prescott in 1989, the brother of Dawn Prescott (Louise Harrison).

== Kathleen Gutteridge ==
Kathleen Gutteridge
- Coronation Street character
- Portrayed by: Elizabeth Rider
- First appearance: 27 August 1999
- Last appearance: 3 October 1999
In-universe information
- Spouse: Two ex-husbands (backstory)
- Sons: Ashley Peacock
- Grandsons: Freddie Peacock; Joshua Peacock (Adoptive)

Kathleen Gutteridge is the biological mother of Ashley Peacock (Steven Arnold). She is first mentioned when Fred Elliott (John Savident) reveals that he is Ashley's father. Fred tries to talk him out of finding her as it would hurt Ashley's adoptive mother, in reality his aunt, Beryl Peacock (Anny Tobin). Kathleen had abandoned Ashley when he was born and Fred gave him to his sister, Beryl, and her husband Sam.

When Kathleen and Ashley eventually meet, Ashley is very bitter towards her. However, they are able to eventually reconcile and Kathleen attends Ashley's wedding to Maxine Heavey (Tracy Shaw). Fred tries to woo Kathleen again, but she turns him down.

== Kieran Hargreaves ==
Kieran Hargreaves
- Coronation Street character
- Portrayed by: Robert Weatherby
- Duration: 1999–2001
- First appearance: 13 September 1999
- Last appearance: 16 April 2001
In-universe information
- Brothers: Danny Hargreaves

Kieran Hargreaves is the brother of Danny Hargreaves (Richard Standing). He appeared intermittently when he helped out on Danny's stall at Weatherfield Market and the brothers played 5-a-side football together.

== Gwen Davies ==
Gwen Loveday
- Coronation Street character
- Portrayed by: Annie Hulley
- Duration: 1999–2000
- First appearance: 11 October 1999
- Last appearance: 16 June 2000
In-universe information
- Husband: Laurie Loveday

Gwen Loveday (also Davies) is a machinist at Underworld, played by Annie Hulley for a period of eight months from 1999 to 2000. She was Jim McDonald's fiancé until he kicked her out after she scammed him of £35,000.

== Duggie Ferguson ==
Duggie Ferguson
- Coronation Street character
- Portrayed by: John Bowe
- Duration: 1999–2002
- First appearance: 15 October 1999
- Last appearance: 6 February 2002
In-universe information
- Occupation: Rugby player (1987–1999); Printer (2001); Property Developer (1999–2002); Publican; Pub Landlord
- Wife: Laura Ferguson (until 1999)
- Sons: Tom Ferguson

Douglas William "Duggie" Ferguson was played by John Bowe. An ex-rugby league player who went into the printing business, Duggie Ferguson first came to Coronation Street after tracking down his son Tom – who worked as a hairdresser for Audrey Roberts (Sue Nicholls). Tom blamed his father for his mother's death and did not want him around. Duggie was hurt by this and bought into a local development on Victoria Street to be close to Tom but there was no reconciliation and Tom left Weatherfield and moved to Leeds.

In late 1999 to early 2000, Duggie turned property developer and employed Steve McDonald (Simon Gregson) as foreman for the building of his Victoria Street complex – those who rented the commercial units included Sally Webster (Sally Dynevor) and Danny Hargreaves (Richard Standing), butcher Fred Elliott (John Savident), and Vikram Desai (Chris Bisson) and Steve, who started up their own mini-cab firm.

Early in 2000 Duggie started a relationship with Debs Brownlow (Gabrielle Glaister), sister of The Rovers landlady Natalie Barnes (Denise Welch). Debs came to Weatherfield to be near her sister after many years working on a cruise ship as a hairdresser. Debs helped Duggie overcome his emotional block concerning women and the couple were happy until Duggie started to develop another property and tried to forcibly evict tenants including Toyah Battersby (Georgia Taylor) and Phil Simmonds (Jack Deam). Both felt that they had been treated badly, especially when Duggie employed Vinny Sorrell (James Gaddas) to evict Phil from his home. Phil went to the press and the adverse report caused Duggie's financial downfall, forcing him to sell the home that he had shared with wife Laura. Dev Alahan (Jimmi Harkishin) bought Duggie's home for a quick sale before putting it back on the market and making a tidy profit. Duggie was forced to move in with Debs, hoping to use it as an office for his business contacts but Debs had a fling with Vinny – Natalie's lover and Duggie's employee. Duggie was furious when Vinny and Debs left town with £400 of rent money.

In December 2000, Natalie decided to sell and The Rovers came under threat by a chain who planned to turn it into a "fun pub" named the Boozy Newt. Duggie stepped in to help the Rovers avoid this but could not buy the place alone so Fred Elliott (John Savident) and Mike Baldwin (Johnny Briggs) invested in The Rovers with Duggie. Neither of the trio wanted to run the place so they employed Liz McDonald (Beverley Callard) to run it. Liz moved into The Rovers with resident barmaid Toyah but her reign as manager was short as, after numerous disagreements with the trio, and husband Jim being transferred to a prison in Leicester, she quit and left Weatherfield. Mike's new wife, Linda (Jacqueline Pirie), took the helm of The Rovers, but her heart was not in it and Duggie persuaded his partners to sell their shares to a 'mysterious owner' – Duggie snapped up their shares and became sole owner of the Rovers.

At the end of 2001, the social club at Duggie's beloved Weatherfield Rugby League club came up for sale. Looking to raise money quickly, Duggie auctioned The Rovers – to Fred Elliott – for £76,000, only to find he had been gazumped for the Rugby Club by fellow ex-professional Marty Flynn. With time and money on his hands, he formed a business partnership with local financial advisor Richard Hillman (Brian Capron). Together, the pair worked in converting an old house – "Oakhill" into luxury flats. Things quickly went sour, however, as Richard realised that Duggie and his men were ripping him off: cutting corners on the construction work and stealing valuable fixtures and fittings from the property. One night, Richard confronted him in the building and angrily declared that their deal was off. As Richard walked away, Duggie leaned over a bannister, which gave way under him and he plummeted two floors down. Duggie was critically injured and unconscious from the fall. Richard started to phone an ambulance, but then stopped upon dialing "99" on his phone. Reflecting on Duggie's dodgy intentions and the fact that he had taken him for a fool, Richard saw an opportunity to be rid of his unwanted business partner and decided to leave him to die. Richard rifled through Duggie's pockets, and took his keys to infiltrate his house – where he managed to decode his safe and steal his cash from the sale of The Rovers. Richard then left the house discreetly, and returned to the house to put the keys back in Duggie's pocket. Richard got a shock when Duggie was gone, but realised he had only crawled to another room and died of his injuries. After leaving his body at the house for the night, Richard returned the following morning with his fiancé Gail Platt (Helen Worth) – who wanted to see the development. There, they discovered Duggie's body. Duggie's death soon became public knowledge around Weatherfield, and they arranged for his funeral a couple of weeks later; however, his son Tom never attended – as he was ostensibly too busy cutting hair on a cruise ship to attend his father's funeral.

Following the events of Duggie's death and funeral, Richard managed to cover-up his involvement in the incident for over a year. During that time, he sought to correct Duggie's mistakes on his development and went as far as to solely incriminate the deceased publican as being responsible for the situation he was in. Richard also discovered that Duggie was aware of plans to build a bail hostel near the flats, severely decreasing their potential value, but had not informed him. Richard's increasing financial woes as a result of the money he had ploughed into the development led to him killing his ex-wife Patricia (Annabelle Apsion) in May 2002 and Duggie's barmaid Maxine Peacock (Tracy Shaw) in January 2003. On 24 February 2003, over a year after Richard left Duggie for dead, his fiancé-turned-wife Gail would ultimately discover the truth behind her husband's homicidal nature. When Richard admits to killing Patricia and Maxine that night, Gail questioned his previous claims about Duggie's fate. In response, Richard confesses to leaving Duggie for dead and robbing all the money from his safe in order to put his business development forward – though he also states that Duggie is to blame for the predicament he was in, and that he deserved his fate. After Gail declared their marriage to be over, Richard left the house and became the most wanted man in the UK – once the truth about his crimes, including Duggie's demise, were exposed. Eventually in March 2003, Richard got his comeuppance when he planned to kill Gail and her children – abducting them and then driving them into the canal, only for his stepfamily to escape to safety whilst he himself drowned.

== Candice Stowe ==
Candice Marie Islandos (also Stowe) was played by Nikki Sanderson. Candice first appeared in 1999 as Sarah-Louise Platt's (Tina O'Brien) best friend from school. She attempted to get Sarah to smoke. She and Sarah were both thirteen at the time. Candice was one of the first people Sarah told of her pregnancy. While many of Sarah's friends turned against Sarah, Candice stuck by her throughout the pregnancy and birth of her daughter Bethany Platt in 2000. Candice proved to be a good friend in times of crisis during Sarah's life, for example she and Todd Grimshaw (Bruno Langley) were instrumental in Sarah being able to evade the clutches of her paedophile kidnapper Gary in July 2001. As they grew up Candice, Sarah and their friend Maria Sutherland (Samia Ghadie) began to turn the heads of the street's men and became increasingly popular with male viewers of the show.

== Dev Alahan ==
Devendra "Dev" Alahan, played by Jimmi Harkishin, made his first appearance on 10 November 1999. He is the ex-husband of Sunita Alahan (Shobna Gulati), and father to Amber Kalirai (Nikki Patel), Aadi Alahan (Zennon Ditchett/Adam Hussain) and Asha Alahan (Tanisha Gorey), although Amber is not Sunita's daughter. Dev has had many affairs, including ones with Deirdre (Anne Kirkbride) and Tracy Barlow (Kate Ford), and a friendship with Stella Price (Michelle Collins), whom Dev later develops feelings for. In 2012, Dev discovered that Sunita had been having an affair with Karl Munro (John Michie), and attacked him, though Karl's partner Stella slapped Sunita. In March 2013, Sunita was trapped in a fire at The Rovers Return Inn, which was started by Karl. Sunita would've made it, but Karl pulled out her oxygen tube and she suffered a cardiac arrest and died.

== Rebecca Hopkins ==
Rebecca Hopkins was played by actress Jill Halfpenny. Rebecca was introduced as a nurse in an abusive relationship and as the colleague of Martin Platt (Sean Wilson), with the pair beginning an affair. Halfpenny liked the way that the romance was portrayed as she believed that it highlighted that the affair was not planned and that the pair really fell for each other. Martin plans to leave his wife Gail Platt (Helen Worth) for Rebecca, but he stalls when he finds out that their teenage daughter is pregnant. Rebecca and Martin continue their affair, but Rebecca becomes tired of waiting for Martin to leave his wife and she eventually leaves for a new job in Dubai in June 2000. Following Rebecca's departure, Martin admits the affair to Gail and their marriage breaks down. Halfpenny later returned for a short stint which aired in December of that year, which involved a brief reconciliation between Martin and Rebecca. Halfpenny enjoyed working on Coronation Street and did not mind that most of her scenes were with Wilson as they got on well together, and she believed that viewers enjoyed Rebecca's storyline.

== Jerry Hopkins ==
Jerry Hopkins
- Coronation Street character
- Portrayed by: Ken Christiansen
- Duration: 1999–2000
- First appearance: 17 December 1999
- Last appearance: 28 April 2000
- Introduced by: Jane MacNaught
In-universe information
- Wife: Rebecca Hopkins (until 2000)

Jerry Hopkins, portrayed by Ken Christiansen, was the abusive ex-husband of Rebecca Hopkins (Jill Halfpenny).

In December 1999, Martin Platt (Sean Wilson) befriended Rebecca when Jerry started domestically abusing her and refused to have children. Martin and his then wife Gail (Helen Worth) met Jerry at a Christmas party, and were appalled at how he treated her. Jerry's behaviour resulted in Martin and Rebecca sleeping together and, to save his marriage, Martin ignored Rebecca. Rebecca then came into work with a black eye, making Martin feel guilty. On New Year's Eve, Jerry found Martin and Rebecca talking to each other and accused them of having an affair, but Martin sent him away with a flea in his ear.

In January 2000, Jerry discovered that Martin and Rebecca were indeed having an affair and informed Gail of this but she didn't believe him. In April, Rebecca served Jerry with divorce papers, causing Jerry to visit her flat and blame Martin for his divorce. Martin, however, put Jerry in his place, and Jerry vowed revenge, but nothing ever happened.
