= Maxine Peacock =

Fictional character from Coronation Street

- Coronation Street character
- Portrayed by: Tracy Shaw
- Duration: 1995–2003
- First appearance: 3 May 1995
- Last appearance: 13 January 2003
- Introduced by: Sue Pritchard
- Book appearances: Coronation Street: The Complete Saga
- Spin-off appearances: Viva Las Vegas! (1997)
In-universe information
- Occupation: Stylist
- Father: Derek Heavey
- Mother: Doreen Heavey
- Husband: Ashley Peacock (1999–2003)
- Sons: Joshua Peacock

Maxine Peacock (also Heavey) is a fictional character from the British ITV soap opera Coronation Street, portrayed by Tracy Shaw. She made her first on-screen appearance on 2 May 1995 and was murdered by Richard Hillman in 2003. The hairdresser Maxine works for Denise Osbourne (Denise Black) and later Audrey Roberts (Sue Nicholls) in their salon. Her storylines centred on her marriage to Ashley Peacock (Steven Arnold) and her affair with Matt Ramsden (Stephen Beckett), later resulting in a paternity dispute. Maxine was involved in one of the soaps most high profile storylines when she was murdered by Richard Hillman (Brian Capron). An estimated 17.6 million viewers tuned in to watch the episode.

== Development ==
In January 2002, ITV denied Shaw was considering leaving the role. Tracy Shaw left the role in 2003 following the birth of her children.

== Storylines ==
Maxine first appears in May 1995 as a college friend of Fiona Middleton's (Angela Griffin), working in Denise Osbourne's (Denise Black) salon. Maxine is known for her bubbly personality. She is a good-time girl and has relationships, often one-night stands, with several men, including Curly Watts (Kevin Kennedy), Des Barnes (Philip Middlemiss), Andy McDonald (Nicholas Cochrane) and Tony Horrocks (Lee Warburton).

Maxine then embarks on more serious relationships with Ashley Peacock (Steven Arnold) and later Greg Kelly (Stephen Billington). She sleeps with her friend Fiona's on-off boyfriend Steve McDonald (Simon Gregson), to get back at Fiona when they fall out over Greg. Her mother Doreen Heavey (Prunella Gee) joins the street in 1999. Seeking security, Maxine puts behind her wild ways and marries Ashley in September 1999. The following year, she suspects Ashley of an affair but realises she was wrong and he has been faithful to her.

Difficulties in the marriage soon emerge when Maxine has trouble getting pregnant. However it is discovered that Ashley undergoing a simple operation will solve the problem. On the night of his operation in autumn 2001, Maxine gets drunk and sleeps with local doctor Matt Ramsden (Stephen Beckett) and discovers soon afterwards that she is pregnant. Maxine suffers complications in pregnancy, meaning the family rely heavily on Doctor Ramsden throughout the pregnancy. In March 2002, Maxine goes into labour early and gives birth to her son, Joshua (Benjamin Beresford).

Over Easter 2002, a confrontation with Ashley leads to him finding out about her one-night stand with Matt. Ashley is furious but is determined not to let anyone else on the street know that the child might not be his. He is determined to get a DNA test done to be certain of Joshua's parentage, despite Maxine's protestations that it is unnecessary and they can mend their relationship. On the day the test is to be done, however, Ashley realises that Maxine is truly sorry for what has happened and that they can, in fact, be a happy family together. He forgives Maxine and takes both her and Joshua home without getting the test done.

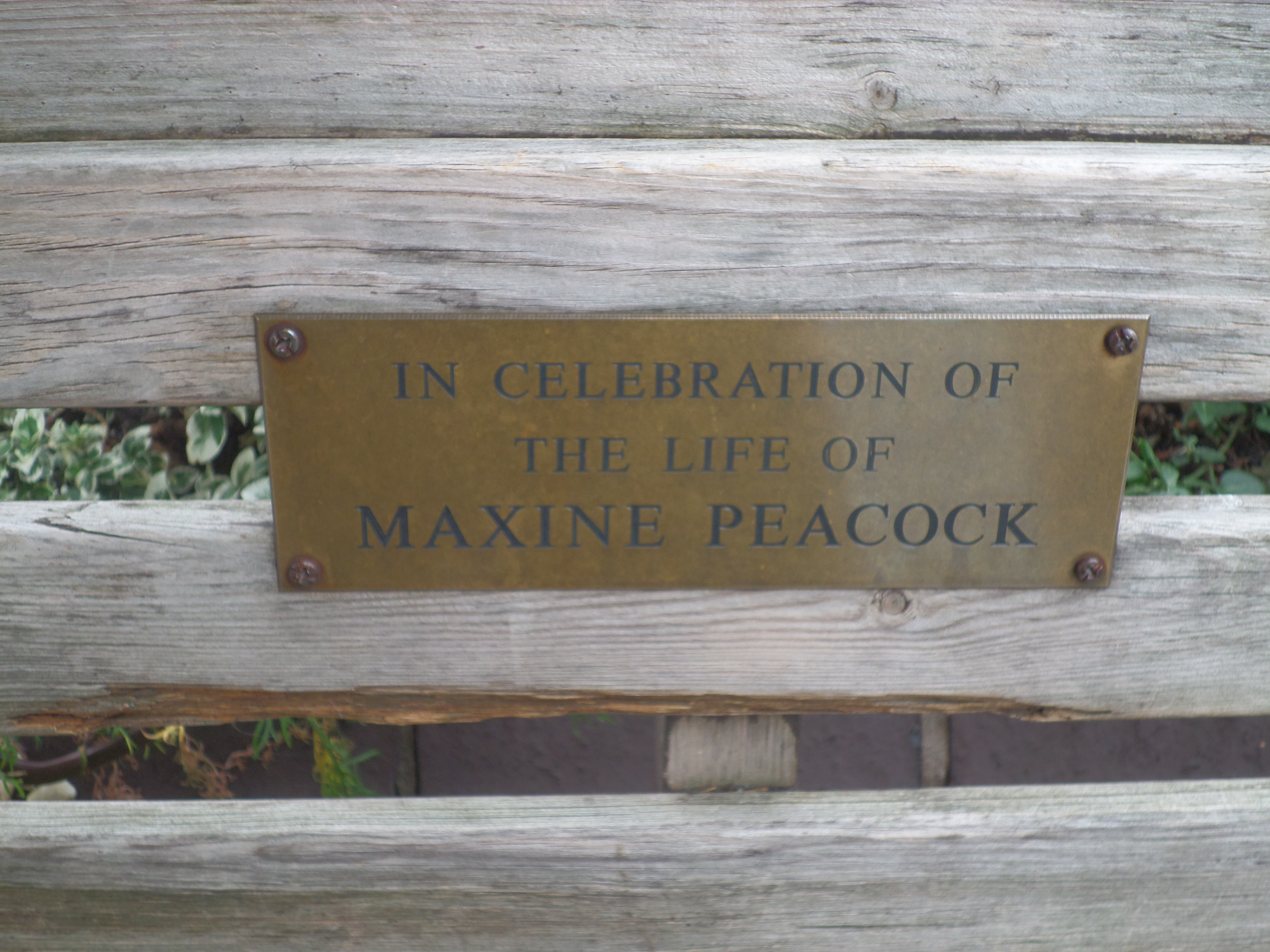
Maxine Peacock's memorial plaque

On 13 January 2003, the street celebrate Doreen's 50th birthday party in the Rovers Return Inn. On the same day her neighbour Richard Hillman (Brian Capron) plans to kill Emily Bishop (Eileen Derbyshire) and to make it seem as if the elderly woman was killed during a bungled burglary. He intended to do so to sell her house that she had sold to him as part of his "Buy Back Scheme". That evening Emily is babysitting at the Peacock house. Maxine returns early from the party at The Rovers Return Inn and walks in to find Richard attacking Emily with a crowbar. In order to leave no witnesses, Richard attacks Maxine. Maxine's final words are to Richard are: "Richard, what are you doing?" to which he replies, "you should have stayed at the party, Maxine." As Joshua starts crying upstairs, Maxine tries to run but Richard kills her instead and Ashley comes home to find Maxine's battered and bloodied body. Emily is injured but survives and makes a full recovery. Richard stages the scene in an attempt to frame local schoolboy Aidan Critchley (Dean Ashton).

At her funeral Richard Hillman gives the eulogy. The scenes were filmed at St Mary's Church, Prestwich. Her former boss Audrey Roberts (Sue Nicholls) suspects her son-in-law Richard of killing her, and investigates herself along with Norris Cole (Malcolm Hebden) and Archie Shuttleworth (Roy Hudd), culminating in him being exposed for his crimes In February 2003.

== Reception ==
In 2001, Tracy Shaw won Sexiest Soap Actress for her portrayal of Maxine Peacock. In 2002, Shaw was nominated for British Soap Award for Best Actress. The sensational murder storyline was praised though the use of pre-water shed violence was criticised. At the time it was written that it was the most gruesome scene in the history of the soap. There were 21 complaints made. The Broadcasting Standards Commission (BSC) upheld complaints made to ITV.
