= Richard Hillman =

Fictional character from Coronation Street

- Coronation Street character
- Brian Capron as Richard Hillman
- Portrayed by: Brian Capron
- Duration: 2001–2003, 2024
- First appearance: Episode 5060; 20 June 2001
- Last appearance: Episode 11451; 25 December 2024
- Introduced by: Jane Macnaught (2001)
In-universe information
- Occupation: Financial adviser Businessman
- Mother: Pamela Hillman
- Wife: Marian Hillman (backstory); Patricia Hillman (backstory); Gail Platt (2002–2003)
- Stepchildren: Nick Tilsley; Sarah Platt; David Platt
- Aunts: June
- First cousins: Alma Halliwell; Kath Simpson

Richard Hillman is a fictional character from the British ITV soap opera Coronation Street, portrayed by Brian Capron. Introduced on 20 June 2001, Richard initially appears as a respectable financial adviser who begins a relationship with Gail Platt (Helen Worth). He later becomes one of the programme's best-known villains, with storylines involving fraud, manipulation and murder. Richard's original stint culminates in March 2003 when, after his crimes are exposed, he abducts Gail and her family and attempts to kill them in a murder–suicide by driving into a canal, where he dies while the others survive.

The character continued to be referenced in subsequent years. Capron appeared in the 2010 spin-off DVD Coronation Street: A Knight's Tale as Richard's brother, Dickie. In December 2024, Capron briefly reprised the role in a dream/vision sequence as part of Gail's exit storyline.

== Creation and development ==
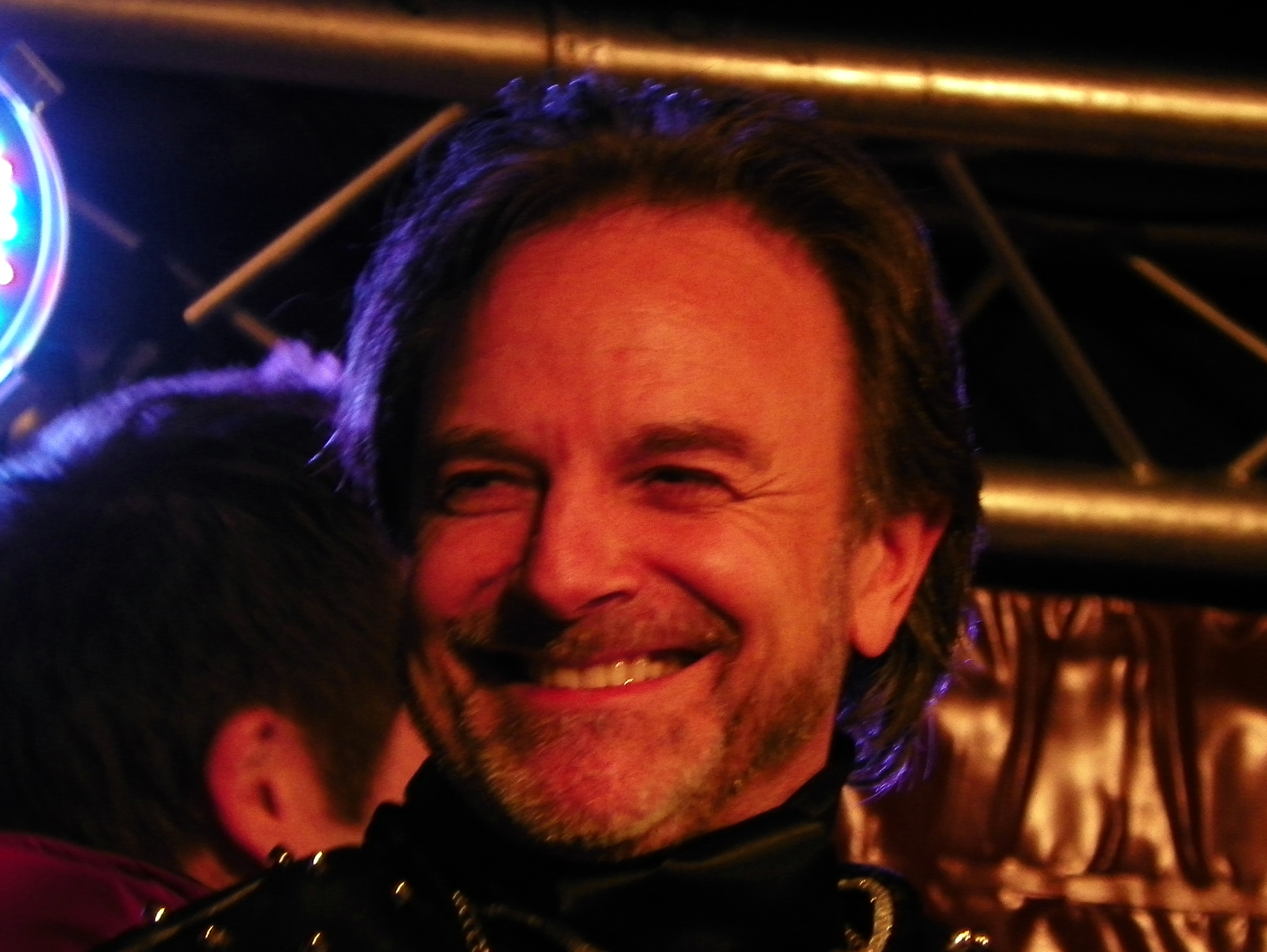
Capron pictured in 2012

Capron said in an interview during the storyline that he enjoyed playing Richard because of the contrast between his outwardly ordinary persona and his darker side. In a later retrospective interview, Capron said he worked to establish Richard as tender and trustworthy within Gail's family before revealing the character's violent behaviour, and recalled that the public response to the storyline included hostile reactions in everyday life.

In early 2002, media reports suggested that Coronation Street would be removing multiple characters; Richard was among those speculated to be affected, although the reports were later denied.

== Storylines ==
=== Backstory ===
Before arriving in Weatherfield, Richard Hillman works as a financial adviser and is married twice. He and his first wife, Marian, attempt to have a child without success; the marriage ends and Marian later dies. Richard subsequently marries his second wife, Patricia, but the relationship breaks down after they learn that Richard is infertile, and they divorce.

=== 2001-2003 ===
Soon enough Richard visits Weatherfield in 2001, attending the funeral of Alma Halliwell (Amanda Barrie) and claiming to be her cousin. He forms a relationship with Alma's friend Gail Platt (Helen Worth) and moves in with her, becoming close to her family, including her children Sarah (Tina O'Brien) and David (Jack P. Shepherd).

Richard's financial activities attract suspicion from Norris Cole (Malcolm Hebden), and it emerges that Richard is involved in questionable property and investment schemes. During a dispute, Richard's business partner Duggie Ferguson (John Bowe) suffers a serious fall; Richard leaves him to die and later steals money from him. When Patricia reappears and threatens to expose Richard's dealings, he kills her on a building site and conceals her body. Richard and Gail marry in 2002.

As Richard's finances worsen, he targets Gail's mother, Audrey Roberts (Sue Nicholls), believing her assets could resolve his problems. He manipulates the family into doubting Audrey's judgement, including convincing Gail that Audrey is unwell and unreliable, and he later attempts to kill Audrey by setting her house on fire. Audrey survives and becomes convinced that Richard is dangerous, repeatedly trying to warn Gail and alert the police, but is initially dismissed.

Richard later attacks Emily Bishop (Eileen Derbyshire) and murders Maxine Peacock (Tracy Shaw) with a crowbar when interrupted, attempting to frame Sarah's then-boyfriend Aiden Critchley (Dean Ashton) for the crime. Audrey remains suspicious, while Richard continues to maintain a façade within the community. Eventually Gail begins to notice inconsistencies in Richard's stories and evidence linking him to the crimes. In February 2003, Gail confronts Richard and he confesses. Gail reports him to the police, and Patricia's body is recovered, confirming Richard as a murderer.

Richard goes on the run as details of his criminality, including his illicit activities and the murders he committed, become public knowledge. Gail faces hostility in Weatherfield, including from neighbours Richard has financially exploited. After a period of apparent recovery for the family, Richard returns to Weatherfield and abducts Gail, Sarah, David and Sarah's baby daughter Bethany, intending to kill them and himself. After a pursuit, Richard drives the family car into a canal. Gail and the others escape and survive, while Richard dies. Gail later identifies his body and attends his funeral.

=== 2024 ===
On Christmas Eve 2024, Gail experiences a vision of Richard on the eve of her wedding to Jesse Chadwick (John Thomson). Richard attempts to unsettle her, but Gail rejects him; it is later revealed to have been a dream sequence. Gail proceeds to marry Jesse and leave Weatherfield.

== Reception and legacy ==
The character of Richard Hillman proved to be successful with viewers and attracted extensive media coverage. On 13 January 2003, an estimated 15.3 million viewers watched the first episode of a double-bill, with 15.6 million watching the instalment in which Richard murdered long-standing character Maxine Peacock; the broadcasts were linked to a reported surge in electricity use after transmission. The two-hander confession episode on 24 February 2003 attracted an average of 17.2 million viewers for the first instalment, with the second averaging 17.6 million and peaking at 19.4 million. On 12 March 2003, 19.4 million viewers watched Richard drive the Platt family into the canal, helping make Coronation Street the most-watched UK television programme of 2003.

In a 2023 interview, Capron recalled receiving hostile reactions from members of the public during and after the storyline, which he said affected his day-to-day life while the character was on screen.

At the 2003 British Soap Awards, Capron won awards including Best Actor and Villain of the Year, while the storyline received multiple honours. In a 2003 TVTimes poll, Richard was voted the top soap villain of all time.

== See also ==
- List of soap opera villains
