= Richard Standing =

British actor

Richard Standing is a British actor. Standing has appeared on the TV series Holby City, Coronation Street, and The Grand. He played the part of Danny Hargreaves in Coronation Street from 1999 to 2001. He also was in Doctors.

Standing was born in Ackworth, West Riding of Yorkshire, he attended Hemsworth High School before studying at Hull University and has performed extensively with the theatre company Northern Broadsides.
