= Stephen Beckett =

English actor (born 1967)

- Born: 24 May 1967 (age 58); London, England
- Occupation: Actor
- Years active: 1992–present

Stephen Beckett (born 24 May 1967) is an English actor, known for portraying Dr Matt Ramsden in Coronation Street and Mike Jarvis in The Bill.

== Background ==
Born in London, Beckett was brought up in Brixton and Croydon, and attended Wilson's School in Wallington. He has three sisters. Beckett left school at the age of sixteen to become an actor, and began his career in street theatre in Covent Garden. He later trained at RADA, graduating at the age of twenty three.

== Career ==
Beckett won his first professional roles a week after graduating from drama school, appearing in Richard II and Callas at the Oldham Coliseum. He went on to work in regional theatre throughout the UK, and with the National Theatre.

Beckett played the role of PC Mike Jarvis in The Bill for five years. He later played Dr Matt Ramsden in Coronation Street from 2000 to 2002, reprising the role in 2006. Discussing the character and the possibility of a return, Beckett said: "People were really protective of Ashley, and very anti the child-stealing doctor. I don't know about returning to Corrie again, but as long as Ashley is in the show there is a potential kidnap plot." But as the character of Ashley has now been written out, with the rest of his on-screen family to follow shortly, the return of Dr Ramsden seems unlikely.

His other television credits include Robin Hood, Doctors and Casualty. In 2006, he guest starred as Richard III in the Doctor Who audio drama The Kingmaker.

Beckett's theatre work includes the original productions of the Alan Ayckbourn plays Drowning on Dry Land and Private Fears in Public Places, Around the World in Eighty Days, The Ghost Train, Murder with Love, Walk Hard, The Business of Murder, The Late Edwina Black and Absurd Person Singular. He has also appeared in pantomime.

Beckett played Prospero in The Tempest for the 2017 open air Stafford Festival Shakespeare 22 June – 8 July 2017.

=== Television ===
Year	Show	Role	Notes
1993–1998	The Bill	Mike Jarvis	Police drama
2000–2002, 2006	Coronation Street	Dr Matt Ramsden	Soap opera
2005	Doctors	Mike Richmond: Freefall	Soap opera
2006	Dalziel and Pascoe	Martin Bendelow: Glory Days: Part 1; Glory Days: Part 2	Police drama
2006	Casualty	Mark Steed: Walk Before You Can Run	Medical drama
2007	Doctors	Damon Ashwood: Innocence Lost	Soap opera
2007	Robin Hood	Legrand: Treasure of the Nation	TV series
2009	Holby City	Gary Daley: Breathe Deeply	Medical drama
2009	Heartbeat	Alan Page: Return Crossing	TV series
2011	House of Anubis	Rory Campbell	TV series

=== Film ===
Year	Show	Role	Notes
1992	Enchanted April	Jonathan	Feature film
2002	The Day That Shook the World	Narrator	Television film

=== Video games ===
Year	Title	Role	Notes
2013	Assassin's Creed IV: Black Flag	Additional voices	Voice role
2014	Assassin's Creed Unity	Charles Dorian	Voice role
2014	Assassin's Creed Rogue	Charles Dorian	Voice role
2015	The Order: 1886	Walla Crowd	Voice role
2016	Battlefleet Gothic: Armada	Commodore Vandez	Voice role
2016	Total War: Warhammer		Voice role
2017	Star Wars Battlefront II		Voice role
