= Fred Elliott =

Fictional character from Coronation Street

- Coronation Street character
- Portrayed by: John Savident
- Duration: 1994–2006
- First appearance: Episode 3743; 26 August 1994
- Last appearance: Episode 6399; 11 October 2006
- Introduced by: Sue Pritchard
In-universe information
- Occupation: Butcher; Pub landlord
- Father: William Elliott
- Mother: Amelia Elliott
- Sisters: Beryl Peacock
- Wife: Sybil Elliott (backstory); Maureen Holdsworth (1997–1998)
- Sons: Ashley Peacock
- Grandsons: Freddie Peacock; Joshua Peacock (adoptive)
- Grandfathers: Bernard Cartwright
- Grandmothers: Alice Cartwright

Fred Elliott is a fictional character from the British ITV soap opera Coronation Street, played by John Savident. He made his first appearance during the episode that aired on 26 August 1994. Savident quit the role in 2005, and Fred died on-screen on 11 October 2006.

== Development ==
Fred's character was developed to loudly repeat everything he said, in a similar manner to Looney Tunes character Foghorn Leghorn.

John Savident revealed that, when filming scenes as Fred, he "was inspired by quirks of real-life people." He explained in an interview with Digital Spy that "a neighbour from his childhood was among the people who influenced his performances". He also claimed that he based Fred's mannerisms "on people I knew."

Savident claimed that he left the soap because he was "simply tired of the five episodes per week grind; probably made worse by the fact that as a Corrie linchpin he was in virtually every episode, with the double toil of repeating all his lines twice."

== Storylines ==
A year after the death of his first wife Sybil, Fred becomes romantically involved with Kathleen Gutteridge (Elizabeth Rider), an employee in the old shop. She becomes pregnant but rejects Fred's subsequent proposal of marriage, stating that she feels too young to be tied down. Kathleen agrees to allow Fred's sister, Beryl Peacock (Anny Tobin) and her husband, Sam, to adopt her baby boy, and the couple subsequently raise Ashley whilst keeping his true parantage a secret. In 1999, Fred lets it slip to Audrey Roberts (Sue Nicholls) that Ashley is actually his son, and Beryl confirms it.

Fred marries Maureen Holdsworth (Sherrie Hewson) in 1997, but she quickly grows tired of his overbearing nature and his plans for their future, and she leaves him a week after the wedding. Fred then marries barmaid Eve Sykes (Melanie Kilburn) in 2001, and buys the Rovers Return Inn for her to work in. However, it transpires that Eve had never divorced her first husband, Ray, leaving Fred alone again.

In 2004, Fred falls out with his friend Mike Baldwin (Johnny Briggs) when Fred discovers that Mike has been having an affair with Fred's girlfriend Penny King (Pauline Fleming). Fred becomes further embittered towards Mike after he introduces Fred to Stacy Hilton (Casey-Lee Jolleys), who cons him by pretending to be from Thailand. During a game of poker, Mike uses Fred's feelings against him and exploited the no-limit rule to win Fred's butcher's shop. The men finally reconcile when Mike agrees to let Fred keep the business.

Following a brief courtship, Bev Unwin (Susie Blake) accepts a marriage proposal from Fred in 2006, and they plan to marry in October. Intending to retire to the country, Fred sells the Rovers Return to Steve McDonald (Simon Gregson). On the wedding day, Fred leaves the church to talk to Audrey, as she recently admitted her feelings for him, despite having previously declined a wedding proposal from him. After a discussion with Audrey, in which Fred asserts his love and commitment to marrying Bev, he leaves for the church but collapses and dies of a massive stroke in the hallway of Audrey's house.

== Reception ==
In 2010, Fred was named as one of the ten best Coronation Street characters by The Guardian, who described him as "the big, bald slap head who said everything twice, and boomingly, started out as a comic gargoyle and became ever sweeter: I said, became ever sweeter [...] John Savident's performance made his failed love affairs moving and his death on his wedding day a calamity." He has also been described as "a colourful character of the type that used to abound Coronation Street but is now becoming scarce."

Based on the character's amount of declined proposals, Fred has been described as someone "who's heard the word 'No!' more times than the celebrity booker on Patrick Kielty Live."

Grace Dent of The Guardian claimed, upon the character's exit from the soap, that she would "miss Fred Elliott a lot", and that she would "miss his blunt common sense, forever flawed by his quirk of proposing to every woman he set eyes on [...] his rants about the life-enhancing properties of steak and kidney pudding [...] his barely concealed enjoyment of a good gossip with Shelley, Betty, and Violet in the Rovers backroom [...] how sometimes Fred would be propping up the bar, saying an unremarkable line in a throwaway scene, but add a wobble of the head or a camp tap of the fag that somehow made it profound."

Aired on 9 October 2006, his final episode was watched by 11 million viewers, exceeding the 9 million who viewed EastEnders the same evening.
