= Steven Arnold =

English actor

- Born: 12 December 1974 (age 50); Warrington, Cheshire, England
- Occupation: Actor
- Years active: 1992–present
- Known for: Coronation Street (1995–2010)

Steven Arnold (born 12 December 1974) is an English actor best known for his role as butcher Ashley Peacock in the ITV soap opera Coronation Street.

== Early life ==
He was educated at Sir Thomas Boteler in Warrington, where his drama teacher suggested he try for a part in a National Film and Television School production called This Boy's Story. It went on to win a British Academy Film Award (BAFTA) Best Short Film

== Career ==
Arnold and his younger brother, Kevin, both appeared in the Granada Television series Children's Ward. He also worked on the medical information film Growing Pains, and made appearances in a range of other TV series including The Bill, Medics, Hetty Wainthropp Investigates and Common As Muck. He also played Ant in Distance Between The Stars for BBC Radio 4.

=== Coronation Street (1995–2010) ===
In 1995, Arnold made his debut on Coronation Street as Ashley Peacock, a role for which he was nominated for Best Actor at the 1999 National Television Awards and Most Popular Actor at the British Soap Awards 2003. After fifteen years on the soap, the character was axed by producer Phil Collinson in 2010, and Ashley was killed off in the episode broadcast to celebrate the show's fiftieth anniversary on 8 December 2010 in the tram crash.

In 2020, the soap star appeared in Week 2 (Cheshire) of Celebrity Come Dine with Me 2020, where he (alongside fellow celebs Charlotte Crosby, Dawn Ward, Ewen MacIntosh and Jay Hutton) competed in a week of wining and dining for a chance to win a £1,000 cash prize for their chosen charity.
