= Tracy Shaw =

British actress

- Born: 27 July 1973 (age 53); Belper, Derbyshire, UK
- Education: Arden School of Theatre
- Occupation: Actress
- Years active: 1995–present
- Spouse: Robert Ashworth (m. 2001–2004)
- Children: 2

Tracy Shaw (born 27 July 1973) is a British actress and singer.

== Early life ==
Shaw was born into the hotel and pub trade, at the time when her parents ran the Talbot Hotel in Belper, Derbyshire. She attended Saint Ralph Sherwin Comprehensive School (now Saint Benedict Catholic Voluntary Academy) in Derby, learnt classical dance at Hilda Davis School of Dance, Belper and went to the Arden School of Theatre in Manchester in 1990, where she gained a degree in theatre studies.

== Career ==
Her best known work is as Maxine Peacock in the long-running soap opera Coronation Street. However, Shaw came into conflict with the show's bosses after they reportedly tried to cut her pay by £20,000 a year and she bowed out from her role as a result. Shaw's character met a tragic end in the episode screened on 13 January 2003, when she was murdered by Richard Hillman (played by Brian Capron).

She has also appeared in numerous ITV dramas. In 2003, Shaw appeared as Sally in the stage play The Blue Room, starring alongside Jason Connery.

Since the birth of her children Shaw has made the occasional return to acting and has performed in several national tours including Mum's the Word (2010), Busy Body (2011) and The Cat and the Canary (2021), as well as lead roles in pantomimes in Worthing and Southsea.

She also had a short lived pop career in 1998, releasing two singles on the Love This Records record label, "Ridin' High" and a cover of Lonnie Gordon's top 10 hit, "Happenin' All Over Again".

== Personal life ==
Shaw had a series of high-profile romances including engagement to Darren Day in the 1990s.

She married Robert Ashworth in June 2001, but a series of early problems occurred including a row on a return flight from the Caribbean after she had been filming ITV's Wish You Were Here...?. In 2015, Ashworth blamed phone hacking for ruining his career and marriage.

In 2003, her father Karl Shaw was featured in an article in the News of the World, and said that Shaw survived on "three bottles of wine and a packet of crisps a day". He also said that if "she carries on this way it will kill her". She made moves to turn her life around including spending two months in rehab and leaving her husband. Before this she had set up an eating disorder charity called The Tracy Shaw Foundation which helps teenagers combat eating disorders, as she had struggled with anorexia during the 1990s, and at one stage her weight plunged below six stone.

Her marriage ended in divorce in 2004, and Shaw set up home with and subsequently became engaged to childhood friend Ashley Poundall. The couple lived in Caversham Heights, Berkshire before they split. They have two sons.

In May 2026, Shaw announced that she had been diagnosed with breast cancer, and that she would need surgery and begin chemotherapy treatment.

=== Stalker ===
In 2000, stalker Kevin Sedgewick pleaded guilty to harassing Shaw over a period of five years. He had written a number of letters to her, as well as Coronation Street co-stars Jacqueline Pirie and Jennifer James, and loitered in the grounds of Granada Studios in Manchester, put his arms around Shaw, and asked for a kiss. Sedgewick pleaded guilty later that year to multiple acts of gross indecency with children. He reportedly suffered from hearing voices in his head.

== Discography ==
=== Singles ===
Year	Title	Peak chart positions
Year	Title	UK
11 July 1998	Happenin' All Over Again	#46
21 September 1998	Ridin' High	#78
