= Brian Capron =

British actor (born 1947)

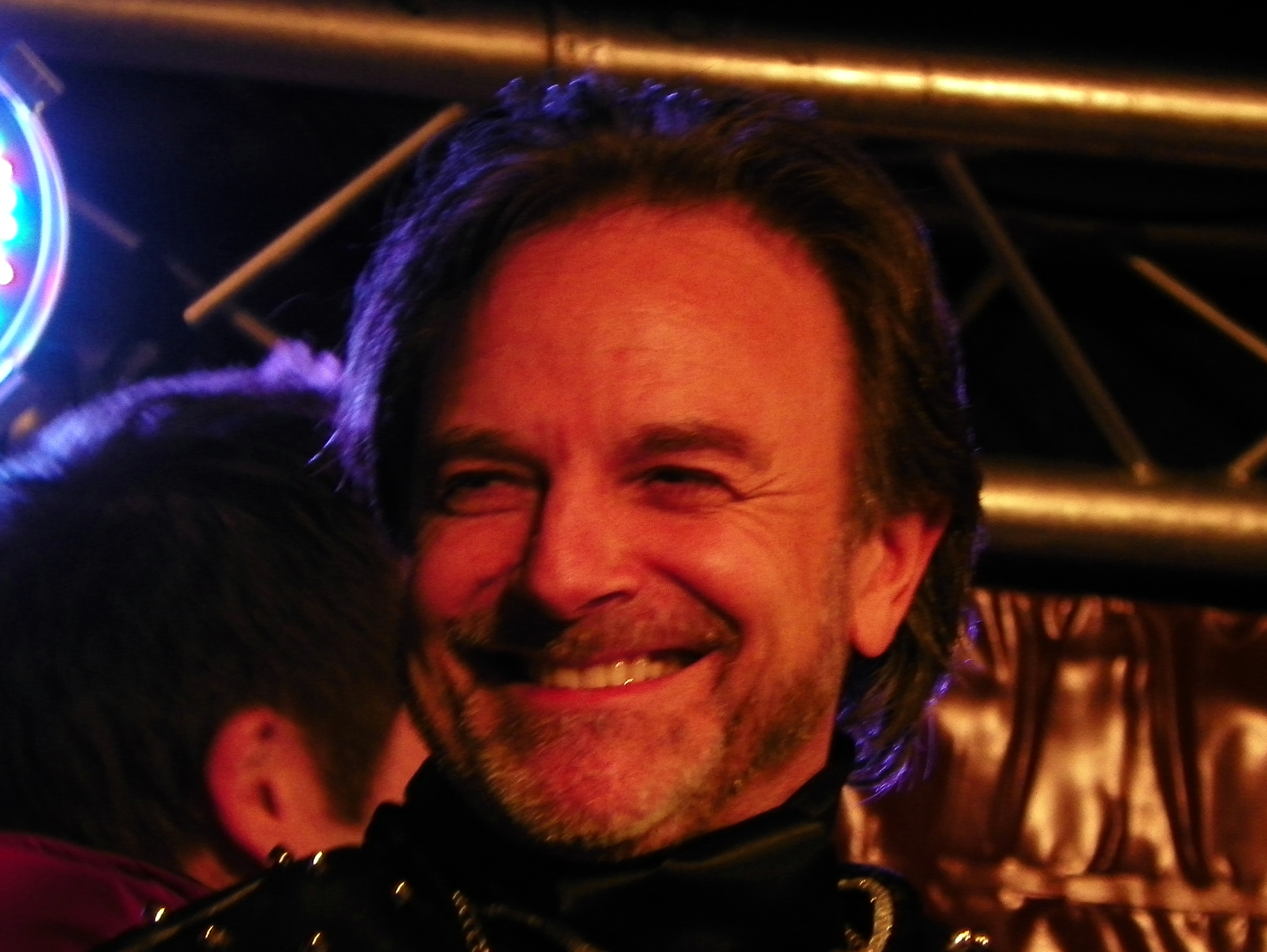
- Capron in 2012
- Born: Brian Capron; 11 February 1947 (age 79); Eye, Suffolk, England
- Education: London Academy of Music and Dramatic Art
- Occupation: Actor
- Years active: 1973–present
- Television: Grange Hill (1980–1983); Coronation Street (1981–1982, 1986, 2001–2003, 2024); EastEnders (1993–1994)
- Spouse: Janette Legge (m. 1974, divorced) Jacqueline Bucknell (m. 2003)
- Children: 3

Brian Capron (born 11 February 1947) is an English actor who trained at the London Academy of Music and Dramatic Art. He first came to public attention through his role of the teacher Mr Stuart "Hoppy" Hopwood in Grange Hill from 1980 to 1983.

He is best known for his role as serial killer Richard Hillman in the long-running ITV soap opera Coronation Street from 2001 to 2003. He had previously appeared in the series as the social worker Donald Worthington in 1981–1982, and 1986. He reprised the role of Richard briefly in 2024 for the exit of Gail Platt (Helen Worth).

== Career ==
Capron first came to public attention through his role of the teacher Mr Stuart "Hoppy" Hopwood in Grange Hill from 1980 to 1983.

In 1984, he appeared as Fred, one of a pair of confidence tricksters in the Minder episode Around the Corner. Also that year, he appeared in The Gentle Touch episode "Do It Yourself" as lead character Maggie Forbes' gay hairdresser Toby.

He also acted in BBC soap opera EastEnders, playing Jerry McKenzie from 1993 to 1994. He played the guest role of Andrew Donelson in Taggart in the episode "A Fistful of Chips", in 1999.

He was cast as George Godley in Jack the Ripper (1988), with Barry Foster as Inspector Frederick Abberline, and the two started filming in October 1987. It was later decided to recast with Michael Caine as Abberline and Lewis Collins as Godley in order to attract larger audiences in the United States.

He is best known for his role as serial killer Richard Hillman in the long-running ITV soap opera Coronation Street from 2001 to 2003. He had previously appeared in the series as the social worker Donald Worthington in 1981–1982, and 1986. He reprised the role of Richard briefly in 2024 for the exit of Gail Platt (Helen Worth).

Other notable TV credits include: Z-Cars, Dixon of Dock Green, Angels, The Sweeney, Blake's 7, Tales of the Unexpected, Full House, Shoestring, Bergerac, Casualty, Birds of a Feather, Murder Most Horrid, The Bill, Taggart, Peak Practice, Judge John Deed, Doctors, Crocodile Shoes, and Where the Heart Is.

His feature film appearances have included roles in Emma (1996), 101 Dalmatians (1996), Still Crazy (1998) and Ambleton Delight (2009).

In The Bill he played Antionio Mancini, a husband who is always rowing and fighting his wife Joanna. Capron played this role twice, firstly in the series 4 episode "Trouble & Strife" and later on in the series 5 episode "Out to Lunch". In the Series 8 episode "Tip off", he played a prisoner, Keith Grounds. He has also played narrator in The Rocky Horror Show in London's West End, alongside Suzanne Shaw, in January 2007.

In 2007, Capron played Nathan Detroit on the Guys and Dolls tour, opposite Claire Sweeney. In September 2007, Capron was announced as one of the contestants to take part in the fifth series of Strictly Come Dancing. He was partnered by Karen Hardy, who was Series 4 champion with cricketer Mark Ramprakash. After finishing in last place on the first show, he found himself in the dance-off along with Kenny Logan, but the judges voted in favour of saving Logan and Capron was eliminated from the show.

== Filmography ==
Year	Title	Role	Notes
1978	Begging the Ring	Private	
1996	Emma	John Knightley	
1996	101 Dalmatians	Television News Reporter	
1998	Still Crazy	Television Executive	
2009	Ambleton Delight	Mayor Michael Keane	
2016	The National Union of Space People	Prime Minister	
