= Helen Worth =

British actress (born 1951)

Helen Worth MBE
- Born: Cathryn Helen Wigglesworth; 7 January 1951 (age 75); Ossett, West Riding of Yorkshire, England
- Occupation: Actress
- Years active: 1961–2025
- Known for: Role of Gail Platt in Coronation Street
- Spouses: Michael Angelis (m. 1991; div. 2001) Trevor Dawson (m. 2013)

Helen Worth (born Cathryn Helen Wigglesworth; 7 January 1951) is a retired British actress. She is best known for playing Gail Platt in the ITV soap opera Coronation Street for 50 years from 1974 to 2024 (with a guest appearance in 2025). In 2014, she received the British Soap Award for Outstanding Achievement. Worth was appointed Member of the Order of the British Empire (MBE) in the 2022 Birthday Honours for services to drama.

== Early life ==
Worth was born to Alfred and Gladys Wigglesworth in Ossett and grew up in Morecambe, Lancashire. She was brought up in a middle-class family and attended private school. Her mother was killed in a hit-and-run road accident in 1971.

== Career ==
After graduating from drama school, Worth worked in repertory theatre, which included a year with the BBC Radio repertory company. It was during her stage debut as Brigitta in The Sound of Music that she shortened her name, following concerns from the show's stars that her birth name would be too prominent on the billing. She played Maisie, under her real name Helen Wigglesworth, in “By the Book”, a 1963 episode of Z Cars. She had uncredited bit-parts in the films Oliver! (1968) and The Prime of Miss Jean Brodie (1969), and appeared on television in the Doctor Who serial Colony in Space (1971), The Doctors, Helen: A Woman of Today (1973), Within These Walls (1974) and The Carnforth Practice (1974).

Worth joined Coronation Street in 1974. She initially stated that she did not plan to leave the series, was happy with her character Gail's never-ending drama and that it was a job she loved. In an interview with GMTV in January 2010, Worth said she loved Gail's storylines and praised the writers for giving her some strong plots over the years, which she hoped would continue. On 9 June 2014, a one-off special about Worth, Gail & Me, aired on ITV. The 30-minute documentary celebrated Worth's 40 years as Gail. In June 2024, ITV announced that Worth had decided to leave Coronation Street after 50 years, with Gail set to make her departure from the soap later in the year. Following speculation regarding Gail's exit storyline, ITV bosses confirmed that she would have a "happy ending". Her last appearance aired on Christmas Day 2024. On 2 January 2025, Coronation Street series producer Iain MacLeod announced that he had a conversation with Worth, where she said that "there might be times in my future when I'll come back", adding that she would reprise her role if there is a big storyline involving the Platt family. On 20 November 2025, it was announced that Worth would make a guest appearance in a Christmas Day 2025 episode of Coronation Street.

== Personal life ==
Worth has a house in London. She married actor Michael Angelis at Chelsea Register Office on 18 January 1991. Worth forgave Angelis when he admitted to an affair in 1995, but they divorced in 2001 after he had another affair with model Jennifer Khalastchi. Following this, it was mistakenly reported by The Sun newspaper that Worth was dating London restaurant owner Simon Hopkinson. Worth married Trevor Dawson, a primary school teacher, on 6 April 2013 at the St James's Church in London.

=== Charity work ===
Worth is a patron of the Born Free Foundation, an international wildlife charity working throughout the world to stop individual wild animal suffering and protect threatened species in the wild. She appeared on television fronting campaigns and joined them at the House of Commons in 2006, to speak about the proposed changes to the Animal Welfare Bill and campaign for the retirement of Anne, the UK's last remaining circus elephant.

She is a supporter of the charity ActionAid and has visited Sierra Leone in support of its work there.

== Filmography ==
Year	Title	Role	Notes
1963	Z-Cars	Maisie	Episode: "By the Book", credited as Helen Wiggleworth)
1968	Oliver!	Urchin	Uncredited
1969	The Prime of Miss Jean Brodie	Schoolgirl	Uncredited
1969	A Handful of Thieves	Rosie	Recurring role
1970	Confession	Cynthia	Episode: "Just as the Sun Was Rising"
1970	The Doctors	Elsie Gibbs	
1971	Doctor Who	Mary Ashe	Colony in Space
1971–1972	Time of Your Life	Pauline Jackson	Main role
1972	The Strauss Family	Elsa	Episode: "Schanni"
1973	Helen: A Woman of Today	Mandy	2 episodes
1974	Within These Walls	Betty	Episode: "The Group"
1974	ITV Sunday Night Theatre	Susan Pitt	Episode: "No Harm Done"
1974	The Carnforth Practice	Ann Pollock	Episode: "Undue Influence"
1974–2025	Coronation Street	Gail Platt	Regular role; 4,472 episodes
1981	Peter-No-Tail	Molly Silknose	Film
2010	East Street	Gail Platt	Charity crossover between Coronation Street and EastEnders

== Awards and nominations ==
Year	Association	Category	Work	Result
2006	Inside Soap Awards	Outstanding Achievement Award	Coronation Street role as Gail Platt	Won
2014	British Soap Awards	Outstanding Achievement Award	Coronation Street as Gail Platt	Won
2019	British Soap Awards	Scene of the Year	Coronation Street as Gail Platt	Won
2019	BAFTA TV Awards	Must-See Moment	Coronation Street as Gail Platt	Nominated

Worth has been honoured twice with the Outstanding Achievement Award at awards ceremonies for her performance as Gail in Coronation Street. In September 2006, Worth won the "Outstanding Achievement Award" at the Inside Soap Awards. Then, on 25 May 2014, Worth won the "Outstanding Achievement Award" at 2014 British Soap Awards. She also received the British Soap Award for Scene of the Year in 2019 for a monologue she performed, which was also nominated for a BAFTA TV Award.
