= Gail Platt =

Fictional character from Coronation Street

- Coronation Street character
- Portrayed by: Helen Worth
- Duration: 1974–2025
- First appearance: Episode 1412; 29 July 1974
- Last appearance: Episode 11755; 25 December 2025
- Introduced by: H. V. Kershaw (1974); Kate Brooks (2025)
- Book appearances: Coronation Street: The Complete Saga; Norman Bates with a Briefcase: The story of Richard Hillman
- Spin-off appearances: Coronation Street: Text Santa Special (2013)
- Crossover appearances: East Street (2010)
In-universe information
- Other names: Gail Potter; Gail Tilsley; Gail Hillman; Gail McIntyre; Gail Rodwell; Gail Chadwick
- Occupation: Receptionist; Cleaner; Waitress; Factory worker; Newsagent
- Father: Ted Page
- Mother: Audrey Roberts
- Stepfather: Alf Roberts
- Half-brothers: Stephen Reid
- Husband: Brian Tilsley (1979–1987, 1988–1989); Martin Platt (1991–2001); Richard Hillman (2002–2003); Joe McIntyre (2010); Michael Rodwell (2015–2016); Jesse Chadwick (2024–present)
- Sons: Nick Tilsley; David Platt
- Daughters: Sarah Platt
- Stepdaughters: Tina McIntyre
- Grandsons: Billy Platt; Harry Platt; Sam Blakeman; Max Turner (adoptive)
- Granddaughters: Bethany Platt; Lily Platt; Harper Platt
- Grandfathers: Robert Potter
- Grandmothers: Nancy Potter
- Other relatives: George Shuttleworth; Augustus Page; Fanny Page

Gail Platt (also Potter, Tilsley, Hillman, McIntyre, Rodwell and Chadwick) is a fictional character from the British ITV soap opera Coronation Street, played by Helen Worth. The character first appeared on-screen on 29 July 1974. Gail is the daughter of Audrey Roberts (Sue Nicholls) and Ted Page (Michael Byrne) and is the mother of Nick Tilsley (Ben Price), Sarah Platt (Tina O'Brien) and David Platt (Jack P. Shepherd) and has featured in some of the most controversial and high-profile storylines in the soap involving her family and her number of relationships – she is the soap's most married female character, having been married seven times (equal to Steve McDonald (Simon Gregson)). In June 2024, it was announced that Worth had decided to leave Coronation Street after nearly 50 years. She made her on-screen departure from the soap in December of that year. Worth reprised the role for a one-off at Christmas 2025, a year after her departure.

Gail's storylines include her marriage to Brian Tilsley (Christopher Quinten); her vicious feud with her mother-in-law Ivy Tilsley (Lynne Perrie); her affair with Brian's cousin Ian Latimer (Michael Loney); coping when Brian is killed in a knife attack; marrying the much younger Martin Platt (Sean Wilson); coping when her teenage daughter Sarah gets pregnant at the age of 13; divorcing Martin after he has an affair with his colleague Rebecca Hopkins (Jill Halfpenny); marrying Richard Hillman (Brian Capron), who she discovers is a serial killer; being kidnapped with Sarah, David and her granddaughter Bethany Platt (Emily and Amy Walton) by Richard and being driven into the canal by him; her feud with Eileen Grimshaw (Sue Cleaver) after her son Todd (Bruno Langley) comes out as gay while dating Sarah; throwing David out after he hides drugs in Bethany's toys; being pushed down the stairs by David after he discovers that she took Tina McIntyre (Michelle Keegan) to a private abortion clinic to terminate a pregnancy fathered by David; marrying Tina's father Joe McIntyre (Reece Dinsdale); being imprisoned for Joe's murder when his plan to fake his own death goes wrong; a relationship with Audrey's ex-partner Lewis Archer (Nigel Havers) only for him to con her out of all her money; a feud with David's wife Kylie Turner (Paula Lane); coping with the secret that Kylie slept with Nick and that her unborn baby may not be David's; marrying the burglar who robbed her home, Michael Rodwell (Les Dennis); keeping the secret that Andy Carver (Oliver Farnworth) is not actually Michael's son but an impostor; trying to help David come to terms with Kylie's death; locking David in the cellar of the Bistro after discovering that he is going to kill Kylie's murderer, Clayton Hibbs (Callum Harrison); dealing with Bethany's involvement in a sex ring; discovering that David has fallen in love with Shona Ramsey (Julia Goulding), the mother of Clayton.

== Casting ==
Actress Helen Worth was cast as Gail Potter in 1974. The role of Gail was initially intended to be very minor, a friend of the more established character Tricia Hopkins (Kathy Jones), who was introduced as part of a new family. The Hopkins family made little impact on the show, and, after they were written out, Gail went on to become one of the most popular and high-profile characters in the history of the series. Although Worth was 23 at the time of her casting, the character of Gail was supposed to be 16 when she first appeared.

== Development ==
=== Feud with Eileen Grimshaw ===
The character's feud with neighbour Eileen Grimshaw (Sue Cleaver) arose when Eileen's son, Todd Grimshaw (Bruno Langley) gave up his university course to remain with Gail's daughter Sarah-Louise Platt (Tina O'Brien); Sarah later married Eileen's older son, Jason, but the marriage soon broke up. Various things, including the 2010 tram crash, have caused them to put aside their differences.

Cleaver has commented, "Eileen's relationship with Gail is horrendous [...] I love all the scraps in the street with Gail. Helen Worth (Gail) and I love doing all that – we have such a laugh with the abusive comments we make for each other. The constant battle is fun. It's a love-hate relationship." Worth has suggested that Gail probably thinks she is "a little better than Eileen". Jenny Platt, who played Violet Wilson, has noted that "Gail's found her nemesis in Eileen, but it's so stupid because actually they are so similar. They are both single mums looking out for their kids." In June 2015, they fought in the street after Gail discovered Eileen had kissed her estranged husband Michael.

=== Relationship with Joe McIntyre ===
In 2008, Gail began a relationship with Joe McIntyre portrayed by Reece Dinsdale. The relationship was rocky just like most of Gail's other relationships but the two characters later went on to marry. The conclusion to the storyline and ending of the relationship came as a result of Joe's death. In November 2009, The Sun reported Joe would decide to disappear on a boating holiday in the Lake District after experiencing a debt crisis which begins to spiral out of control. In a surprise twist, Joe ends up losing his life for real when a sail pole knocks him unconscious and into freezing cold water before he can carry out his plan in full. The plot somewhat mirrored the real-life case of fraudster John Darwin, who faked his own death while canoeing before turning up alive five years later in December 2007. A source said: "It's a copycat storyline of Darwin's insurance scam. Corrie bosses have decided that Joe will meet a watery end. He decides to fake his own death to avoid his crippling debt problems and leave wife Gail with the proceeds from his life insurance."

Speaking of how Joe compared to Gail's other husband, Helen Worth said: "On paper, Joe looks quite normal! He's like any other normal man with problems and they're getting on top of him. Gail will share those problems. Like she says, when Gail marries him, Joe's problems become her problems and that's the way it should be. That sums their relationship up, really. She'll do anything for him because Gail can't let her dream go. To realise that he's the wrong man would spell the end of her dream, so she's not going to do it."

In 2009, Worth revealed in an interview with the Daily Mirror that she thought Coronation Street bosses were going to write the character out of the soap as an upcoming storyline would see her on trial for murder: "At the time I was genuinely anxious as to whether it was the end of the road for me and Coronation Street... I wasn't shocked, because it can happen to an actor at any time. But I was very pleased when I found out that whatever happens at Gail's trial, I will be staying in the show."

=== Relationship with Michael Rodwell ===
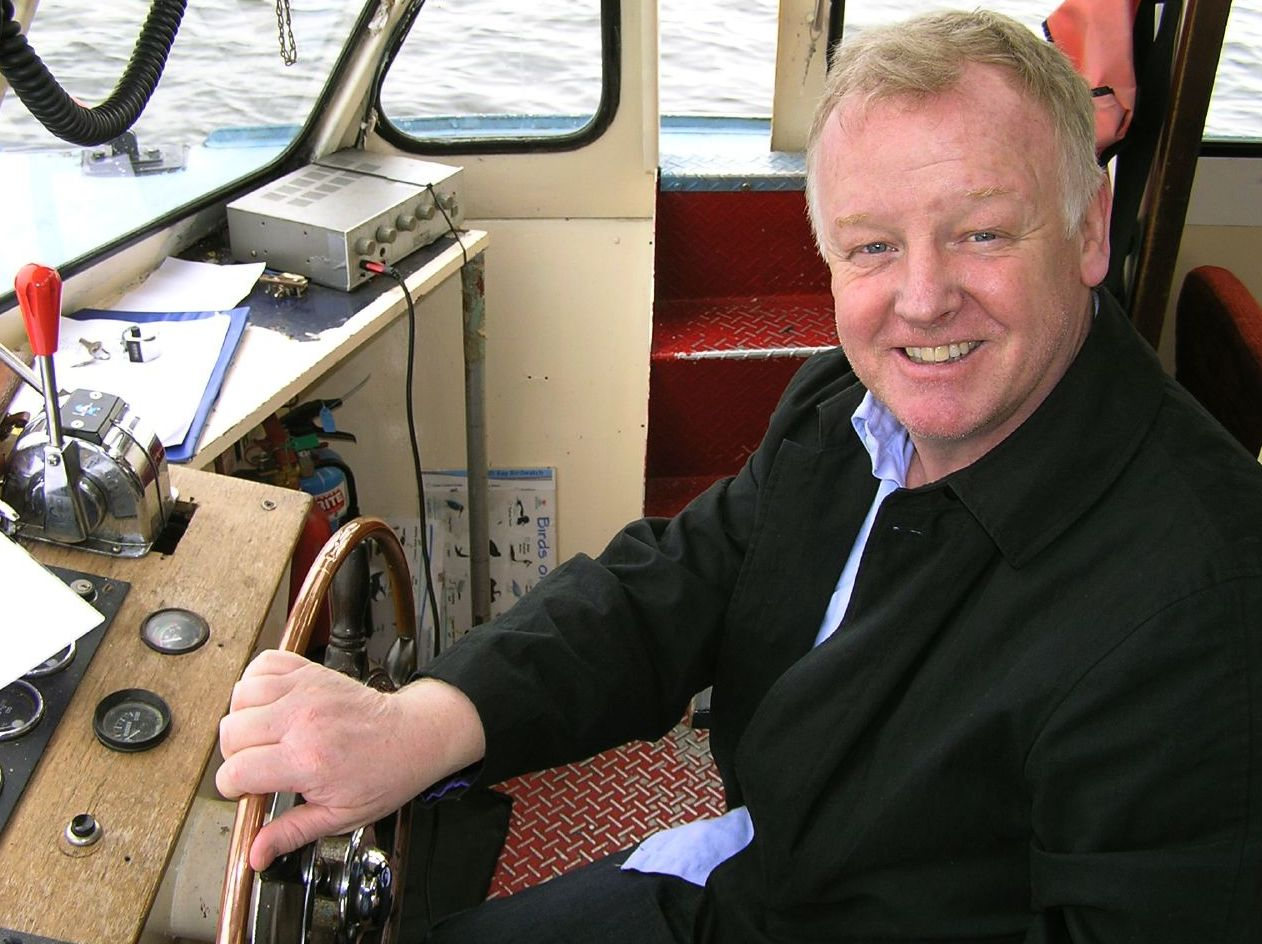
Les Dennis portrayed Michael Rodwell

Les Dennis joined the show in 2014, as Michael Rodwell, who was being lined up as a love interest for Gail. Michael arrived in Weatherfield and burgled Gail's house, but returned later in the year to try to make amends with Gail as part of a restorative justice storyline. (The restorative justice scheme involves people who have admitted crimes meeting their victims or making amends by doing some sort of remedial work.) Gail would sacrifice everything for her relationship with Michael, in particular her relationship with son Nick Tilsley (Ben Price) who disapproved of the relationship. After just over two years, Rodwell was written out of the series, dying of a heart attack.

=== Departure and guest return ===
On 5 June 2024, it was announced that Worth had decided to leave after 50 years. Worth said in a statement: "This year felt like the perfect time to leave the show after celebrating 50 years in the most wonderful job on the most wonderful street in the world. I made the decision at the start of the year and spoke to the producers who were very kind and understanding. I have been truly blessed to have been given the most incredible scripts week in week out, and to have worked with fantastic actors, directors and a brilliant crew. The past 50 years have flown by and I don't think the fact that I am leaving has quite sunk in yet." Executive Producer Iain Macleod described Worth and Gail as "legends". It was revealed that Worth would begin filming her departure storyline in July with her departure scenes airing towards the end of the year. Co-star Sally Dynevor who plays Sally Webster was a guest on an episode of Loose Women when the announcement news broke expressed her surprise at Worth's departure.

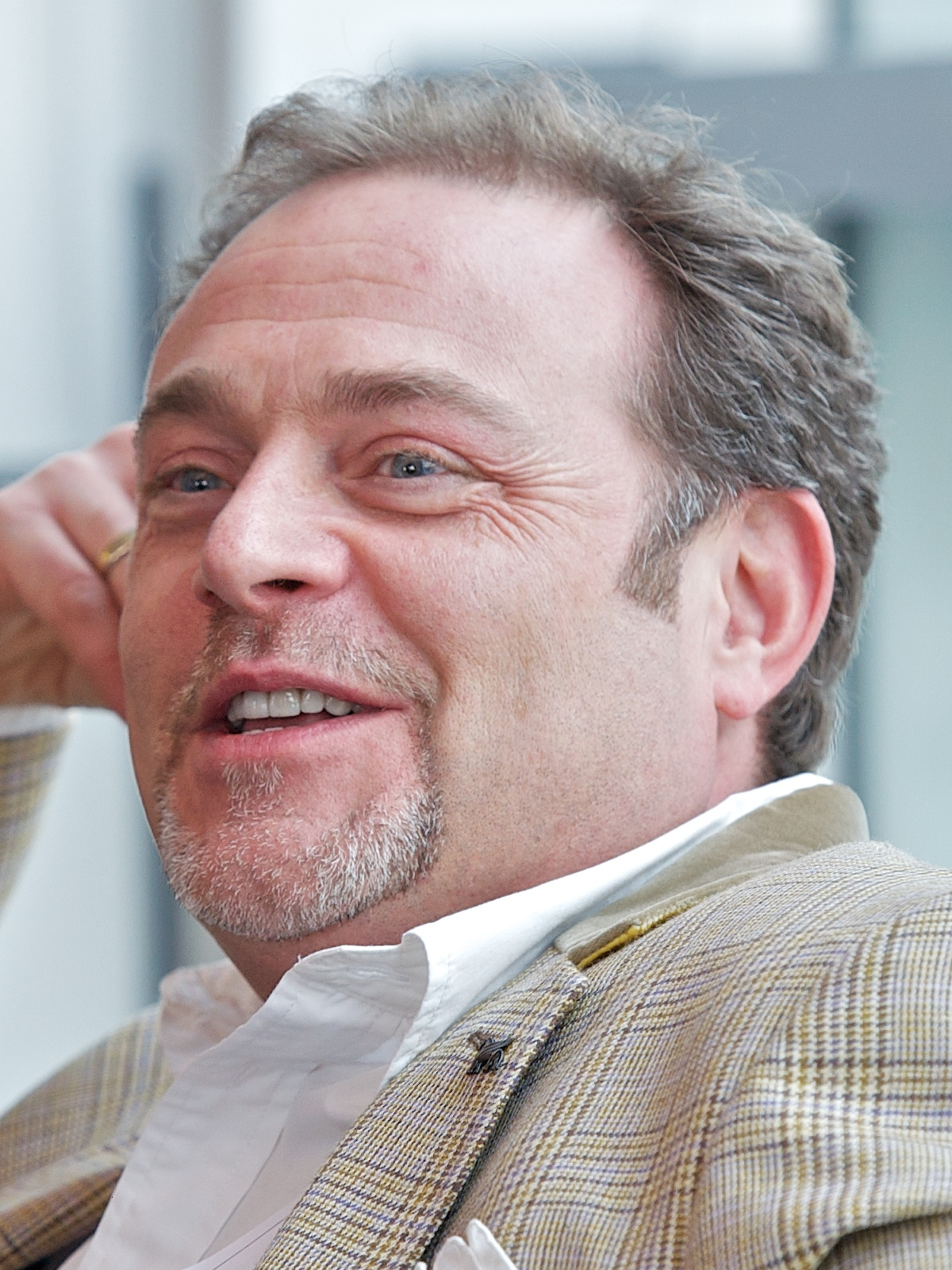
John Thomson portrayed Jesse.

On 29 June 2024, it was announced that Sean Wilson would reprise his role of Gail's ex-husband, Martin Platt for a short stint to coincide with her exit. It was later announced on 16 August 2024 that Wilson had quit for personal reasons after beginning filming his return, and that scripts were being rewritten to remove Martin's appearance. On 19 August 2024, it was announced that John Thomson would be reprising his role as Jesse Chadwick as part of Gail's exit storyline after Sean Wilson announced he had quit his role of Martin Platt, who was initially meant to return for Gail's departure. An ITV spokesperson reported to Digital Spy: "Sean Wilson has stepped down from filming for personal reasons". As a result, storylines had to be changed drastically. Many speculations have been made regarding how Chadwick will fit in with Gail leaving The Cobbles, but executive producer, Iain MacLeod has confirmed that Gail won't be killed off: "Gail won't die. It didn't feel like killing her off would be right. Gail's exit is a brilliant story. I thought, 'What do the viewers want to see?'. Gail has had a hard life. She had a difficult childhood and disastrous marriages. So, we though what viewers really want is a happy ending for her, so that's what we're doing."

On 25 November 2024, new Coronation Street producer Kate Brooks revealed the exit story for Gail to Digital Spy: "In a word, Christmas is very fun this year. It's a very lively Christmas on the Street and lots of bombshells are dropped. Obviously, this is set against Gail's wedding. Whether she goes through with that or not, I cannot say anything! But this is a story with the Platts at the heart of it. It's really festive. Basically it's a story about family and how secrets impact and implode on a family. There are a lot of betrayals. Lots of secrets are exposed during this episode and it will be like classic Corrie, with a bit of a twist. I think we're all in need of a bit of escapism at the minute and we've had quite a dark but brilliant few months on the cobbles. The Christmas period for us is all about trying to tap into the family dynamics of the Platts, what makes people tick, and ultimately trying to make sure that we give glorious Gail the exit that she deserves." In December 2024 it was announced that Capron would return as Richard's "ghost" in order to tie into Gail's upcoming exit.

On 2 January 2025, Coronation Street series producer Iain MacLeod announced that he had a conversation with Worth, where she said "There might be times in my future when I'll come back". Adding that Worth will reprise her role as Gail Platt, If there is a big storyline going on with the Platt family.

In November 2025, it was revealed that Gail will make a brief return for Christmas Day 2025.

== Storylines ==
Gail Potter is introduced as a friend of Tricia Hopkins (Kathy Jones). She is first seen as a teenager in July 1974 when she tells Ray Langton (Neville Buswell) that Tricia fancies him. In April 1975, Gail discovers that the man her mother was living with – Frank Peterson – isn't her father as she thought. Angry, Gail leaves home, moving into the shop flat with her co-worker/former schoolfriend, Tricia. Gail is plagued by nuisance telephone calls and when phone engineer John Lane turns up one evening to catch the culprit, Gail realises that it is him. Luckily, Emily Bishop (Eileen Derbyshire) sees him go in, her suspicions aroused, and the police are called. After the warehouse they work in burns down, Gail and Tricia work in the Corner Shop, but when Renee Bradshaw (Madge Hindle) buys the shop and flat in June 1976, the girls are evicted. Tricia leaves Weatherfield and Elsie Howard (Pat Phoenix) returns. Elsie ensures that Gail can stay in the flat. Elsie and Gail find work at Sylvia's Separates and move into No 11. She loses her virginity to Roy Thornley but discovers that he is married and Gail is cited in a messy divorce. In December 1976, Sylvia's Separates is taken over by Mike Baldwin (Johnny Briggs) and renamed the Western Front. Elsie is moved from boutique manager to factory supervisor, and Gail is promoted to manager with Suzie Birchall (Cheryl Murray), working for her. In early 1977, Suzie joins Elsie and Gail at No 11, and the three women become one of the programme's most popular groups.

In November 1978, Mike Baldwin closes down the Western Front, but things look up for Gail in December when Brian Tilsley (Christopher Quinten) gatecrashes a party at Elsie's and asks her out. In January 1979, Gail gets a job working with Emily Bishop in Dawson's Cafe. By April, Brian and Gail are engaged, beginning a long feud between Gail and Brian's mother, Ivy (Lynne Perrie), and saw the arrival of Gail's mother, Audrey Potter (Sue Nicholls). Brian and Gail are married that November and move in with Brian's parents at number five. Gail and Brian move to a one-bedroomed house at 5 Buxton Close in August 1980 and on New Year's Eve, their son, Nicky (Warren Jackson), is born. The Tilsley's marriage never seems wholly secure, especially with narcissistic Brian being given free rein by his doting mother, and soon hits a rocky spot. Gail is propositioned by Brian's friend Colin Jackson, and Brian is dazzled by customer Glenda Fox. In January 1982, Brian's boss, Ron Sykes, announces that he is selling the business and emigrating to the Persian Gulf. Faced with the choice of working away or redundancy, Brian goes to work in Qatar. Gail makes friends with neighbour Jackie Moffatt, but bored at home on her own, asks Jackie to look after Nicky while she works part-time in Jim Sedgewick's café (she had briefly worked there when it first opened in 1980), now run by Jim's ex-wife, Alma Sedgewick (Amanda Barrie).

Brian announces that he is staying in the Gulf, extending his contract by two months. Lonely, Gail agrees to go for a drink with truck driver Les Charlton (Graham Fellows), but Nicky goes missing and is eventually found in the newly rebuilt number seven. A distressed Gail thinks about giving up her job and loses interest in Les. However, Les's last visit coincides with Brian's return, and Brian makes it very clear to Les that he is not welcome. Brian decides not to return to Qatar and admits having "had a drink" with a nurse and Gail realises that his friendship with her was a lot closer than he is admitting. In August 1982, using the money he made in Qatar, Brian opens a garage in partnership with Ron Sykes and for a while, the Tilsleys are happy. In March 1983, things seem to be going so well that Brian takes out a bank loan and buys Ron Sykes's share of the garage. However, there is a change in fortunes – Brian's father, Bert (Peter Dudley), is seriously injured while overinflating a tyre at the garage and dies soon afterwards, and the business starts losing money – forcing Brian to put it up for sale. He is talked out of selling by Gail and Mike Baldwin, deciding to sell the house in Buxton Close instead, and move back in with Ivy. The Tilsleys' marriage now begins to crumble, as living under the same roof irritates Ivy and Gail, and when, in August 1984, Gail is offered the job of manager at Jim's Café, she takes it – annoying Brian and Ivy. A couple of months later, there is more friction when Brian finds that Audrey's latest boyfriend, George Hepworth (Richard Moore), made a pass at Gail. By April 1985, Gail has had enough and leaves Brian, moving her and Nicky into a bedsit. This finally makes Brian get a council house so Gail and Nicky move in there with him.

Early in 1986, Brian's Australian cousin, Ian Latimer (Michael Loney), visits and stays with Ivy. Soon, he and Gail are having an affair. Gail admits this to Brian on learning that she is pregnant and doesn't know who the father is. Blood tests show that Sarah Louise (Lynsay & Leah King), who is born in January 1987, cannot be Ian's, but Brian never really bonds with Sarah-Louise, and moves in with his new girlfriend, Liz Turnbull (Catriona A Elliott). Soon after, Brian divorces Gail. Gail starts dating Jeff Singleton (Jonathan Barlow), and Brian doesn't like the idea of him being a stand-in father. After Brian's abortive attempt to kidnap Nicky, Brian and Gail reconcile and he moves back into Hammond Road, and they remarry in February 1988. However, Gail realises that she married too young and Brian's old-fashioned attitudes about wives mean that the marriage will never work, and so they separate again but continue living under the same roof. Eventually, Gail asks for another divorce after a massive row one evening in February 1989. Brian's attempt to find other female company that same evening results in his being stabbed to death outside a nightclub. Ivy blames Gail for the death of her son and their relationship sours even further when Gail refuses to let her husband have a Catholic funeral, despite that being his religion.

Alma returns to Weatherfield from Spain late in 1988, and in June 1989, offers Gail a 40% partnership in Jim's Café, which she accepts. Martin Platt (Sean Wilson) has been working at the café since 1985. To Gail's surprise, she finds herself attracted to Martin, who is 10 years younger than she is. Martin comforts Gail when she is upset about recent events and a few kisses leads to them ending up in bed together.

Much against Ivy and Audrey's wishes, Martin moves in with Gail and the children, and by the spring of 1990, she is pregnant. Feeling that she can't cope with three children and doesn't want Martin to be tied down too young, she decides to have an abortion. Martin catches her just as her train pulls out of the station and persuades her not to go ahead so David (Thomas Ormson) is born on Christmas Day 1990. Gail and Martin marry in September 1991 and, in December, Martin buys number eight and the Platt family move in. Martin formally adopts Nicky and Sarah-Louise despite fervent opposition from Ivy who believes that he is trying to replace Brian as the children's father.

Gail's emotional trials are far from over. When Martin studies to become a nurse, Carmel Finnan (Catherine Cusack), a fellow student, stays with them in late 1992 and becomes besotted with Martin. Gail angrily throws her out after Carmel tells Gail that she is too old for Martin, but she returns a few weeks later, claiming she's expecting Martin's baby and tries to kidnap David. This causes a fight between her and Gail, and Carmel falls down the stairs. At the hospital, it is found that she isn't pregnant and her grandfather arrives, explaining her mental history.

During 1994, tensions build as a now teenaged Nicky refuses to acknowledge Martin as a "father" (particularly when he disciplines him for smoking), causing problems for Martin and Gail. Depressed after Christmas celebrations at work, Martin sleeps with Cathy Power (Theresa Brindley), and is caught kissing her by Audrey's husband, Alf Roberts (Bryan Mosley). Alf and Martin agree to keep it between them, but when Audrey finds out, Martin confesses everything to Gail. Gail takes the betrayal very badly, and although they continue to live together, she and Martin barely speak, but reconcile after a family holiday in North Wales. However, tensions with Nick (as he now wants to be called) grow and are aggravated by Ivy's death in August 1995, more than a year after she had left Coronation Street. She leaves most of her estate to Nick – providing he changes his name back to Tilsley. Months of wrangling and bad feeling ensue, with Gail, Martin, Nick and Don Brennan (Geoffrey Hinsliff), Ivy's second husband, constantly arguing. Martin, however, disagrees since he is his adoptive father, but Gail knew that Ivy wanted Nicky to have Brian's surname. To end her feud with Ivy despite her death, they agreed to change his surname back to Tilsley. In January 1996, Gail settles the row by getting Don to pay Nick £12,000 for the house. Soon after, Gail meets her half-brother, Stephen Reid (Todd Boyce), when he visits Weatherfield. Later in 1996, Martin and Gail's marriage is strained owing to conflict between Nick and Martin, and so Stephen invites them to Canada for a holiday and Nick decides to go to school there, using the money Don paid him for Ivy's house.

Roy Cropper (David Neilson) begins working in the café with Gail when Alma wants to spend less time there and, eventually, Alma sells her share in the café to Roy after she and Gail fall out over Stephen's decision to cancel his contract with Mike. Gail and Roy get on very well, and things tick over as usual. Roy even gives Gail and Martin a weekend trip to Paris from the vouchers he has saved. In 1997, Don is in prison after attacking Mike and Alma, but is diagnosed with terminal cancer and asks to see Gail to make amends for the trouble he caused since Ivy's death. Don leaves hospital, attacks Mike and crashes Alma's car into the viaduct, killing himself. Nick (now played by Adam Rickett) returns for the funeral and starts dating Leanne Battersby (Jane Danson), part of a loud, obnoxious family now living in number five. Gail is furious when Nick and Leanne elope to Scotland in January 1998.

Brian's murderer, Darren Whately, is released from prison on parole in 1998 and Nick persuades Leanne to write to him, and so he starts stalking her. Gail urges Nick to report him to the police when things get out of control and Darren is returned to prison. Leanne and Nick are shocked to learn that Leanne is pregnant, something Gail disapproves of, and their marriage ends after Nick pressures her to have an abortion and tell people that she miscarried. Nick returns to Canada, much to Gail's delight that he is no longer with Leanne, behaviour very similar to her former mother-in-law, Ivy.

Gail tires of her responsibility of the café and sells her share to Roy and his new girlfriend Hayley Patterson (Julie Hesmondhalgh), but continues to work there. The café relocates in 1999 to a new development on Victoria Street and is renamed Roy's Rolls. 1999 also sees Gail and Martin's marriage get into serious trouble after Gail demands Martin have a vasectomy after she has a pregnancy scare and doesn't want any more children. Martin refuses and Gail's unreasonable behaviour and anger pushes Martin to become good friends with another nurse, Rebecca Hopkins (Jill Halfpenny). They initially bond over troublesome spouses, but soon begin an affair that lasts into 2000. Martin plans on leaving Gail for Rebecca, but this is put on hold when they discover that Sarah (now played by Tina O'Brien), now 13, is refusing to eat and being sick. Fearing that she is developing an eating disorder, Gail takes her to the doctor and learns that Sarah is five months pregnant and gives birth to Bethany (Emily & Amy Walton) in June 2000. Sarah struggles with motherhood and Gail quits her job so she can look after Bethany while Sarah is at school and enjoy being a teenager occasionally. The truth about Martin's affair comes out soon after the baby's birth and Gail is devastated. She tries to keep the family together, but it doesn't work, as Gail keeps taking her frustration out on Sarah, accusing her of being a bad mother, which causes her to run away and to move into the Croppers' flat. Gail feels very guilty after Sarah returns home. She breaks down and tells Martin she wants a divorce. Martin moves out in October 2000, and he and Gail divorce the following year. Soon after Martin leaves, Gail gets a job as a receptionist in the newly built medical centre.

The character of Gail then becomes central to one of the soap's most high-profile plot lines in which episodes would go on to get viewing figures more than 17 million. Following Alma's death in June 2001, Gail becomes friends with her cousin, Richard Hillman (Brian Capron), a financial adviser. They gradually form a relationship for the rest of the year and are eventually married in July 2002. However, while their marriage appears to be thoroughly perfect as Gail had hoped, she is totally unaware that Richard has financial difficulties after proposals for a bail hostel to be built near apartments he has developed causes them not to sell; because of this, Richard ends up murdering two people and even tries to kill Gail's mother, Audrey, along with her friend Emily Bishop. When Audrey begins to suspect Richard, she tries to warn Gail, but Gail believes Audrey is suffering from dementia, as Richard makes everyone, including Audrey at first, believe through the use of mind games. This leads to a row and Gail cuts off contact with Audrey when she continues to call Richard a murderer, much to Audrey's heartache. Also, while Gail is still oblivious to Richard's actions, Sarah is seriously injured in a car crash caused by her boyfriend, Aidan Critchley (Dean Ashton), after he steals Ken Barlow's (William Roache) car. Aidan escapes from the wreckage, leaving Sarah for dead. She makes a full recovery, but never forgives Aiden for what he did. When Gail begins to suspect that her husband is more than he seems, she confronts him with her suspicions and the worst is confirmed when Richard admits everything to her in a special two-hander episode broadcast on 24 February 2003, admitting that he murdered both Maxine Peacock (Tracy Shaw) and his ex-wife Patricia (Annabelle Apsion), left his business partner and the Rovers' landlord Duggie Ferguson (John Bowe) to die following a collapse, and tried to kill both Audrey and Emily – the latter which led to Maxine's murder and Richard subsequently framing Aidan for the crimes as revenge for Sarah's accident. Richard, after confessing that his crimes were all part of his financial problems, tries to justify his actions while asserting his love for both Gail and her children.

Gail, however, is absolutely horrified with the truth and calls Richard "Norman Bates with a briefcase" before throwing him out. She later reconciles with Audrey and together the two give a statement to the police about Richard's confession, thus exposing his crimes and making him the most wanted fugitive in the country. Gail subsequently attempts to get her life back on track, but Richard secretly returns three weeks after fleeing Coronation Street. He takes Gail, Sarah, David (now played by Jack P. Shepherd) and Bethany hostage and attempts to gas them in the garage, but their neighbours hear the sound of Richard's car in the garage, so he speeds off and drives them all into the canal. Gail, Sarah, David and Bethany survive, but Richard drowns. Gail later finds out that she faces financial ruin owing to Richard's actions and could lose her house. Her neighbour Vera Duckworth (Elizabeth Dawn) accuses her of being in league with Richard, as she and her husband Jack (Bill Tarmey) also face financial instability as Richard was their financial adviser. However, Audrey saves the day by using her life savings to buy the house for Gail and her family.

After managing to overcome her trauma with Richard for the rest of 2003, Gail manages to rebuild her life until she and Sarah end up having another problem together. This begins with Sarah and Bethany moving out of the house and into a flat with Todd Grimshaw (Bruno Langley), her closest friend. This prompts Gail to call Social Services, hoping to get Bethany returned to her so Sarah will have to return, too. When this doesn't work, Gail and Sarah have no contact for several months. Sarah becomes pregnant again and she and Todd get engaged, further angering Gail, just like her relationship with her former mother-in-law, Ivy. However, Todd admits to Sarah that he is gay, and so they break up, and Sarah and Bethany move out, returning to live with Gail. When Sarah tells Gail what has happened, the fight between Gail and Eileen (Sue Cleaver), Todd's mother, turns physical, as Gail is furious at the position Todd has left Sarah in: 16 years old and 7 months pregnant with her second child. Sarah is rushed to hospital with a placental abruption and needs an emergency Caesarean section. She survives, but baby Billy is very ill and dies the day after he is born.

Gail also does her best to come between Nick and his new girlfriend, Maria Sutherland (Samia Ghadie), believing that Maria will break Nick's heart again, as she emigrated with him to Canada briefly once before but returned alone, as she wasn't happy there. They eventually do break up, and, despite being very cold with each other for several months, Gail comforts Maria when she is devastated that Nick leaves to start a new job in Nottingham.

In 2005, Gail begins a relationship with chiropodist Phil Nail (Clive Russell), much to David's annoyance, and he constantly tries to come between them.

From early 2006, Gail receives cards from her late husband Richard, unnerving her so much that she becomes reliant on sleeping pills and drink. She contacts the police and thinks that her new boyfriend, Phil, is responsible, and this causes Phil and David to argue, resulting in him and Gail breaking up and Phil leaving. Her relationship with David is strained to the point of breakdown when she realises that he is sending the cards. She takes him to the police to close the case, but doesn't press charges. Gail forgives David and believes that she can keep him in line, only to find that he is not going to school. On Christmas Day 2006, David unveils Ivy Brennan's diary, revealing Gail's planned abortion, and he also exposes Audrey's affair with Bill Webster (Peter Armitage). David runs away from home when Gail tells him she wants him to start paying rent, but returns with the police after claiming that Gail is abusing him. The final straw is when Bethany swallows an ecstasy tablet that was hidden in her doll's head by David in September 2007. Bethany is rushed to intensive care, and, following an ultimatum from Sarah, Gail makes David move out and orders him not to attend Sarah's wedding to his enemy Jason Grimshaw (Ryan Thomas). As revenge, David writes a suicide note and leaves it on the kitchen table for Gail to find the day before the wedding. However, Sarah finds it first and believing it to be another attention-seeking stunt, she puts it in the bin.

The next day, David sees his family still going to the wedding despite the suicide note. To prove his point, he drives his car into the same part of the canal that Richard had driven them all into four years earlier. A distraught Gail waits for hours for news on whether he is alive or dead, and, when he eventually turns up at the house, Gail allows him to move back in, and promises him that she will never let him down again. Her relationship with Sarah becomes strained when it is revealed that Sarah had been aware of the suicide note.

Gail's half-brother, Stephen, comes to stay for Christmas and offers David a job in Milan, which he accepts. However, as revenge for spoiling her wedding day, Sarah plants ecstasy tablets in his drawer at Audrey's salon, and, when Audrey finds them, Gail insists that David is not to go to Milan. Sarah is offered the job instead and plans on leaving with Jason and Bethany. However, she joyfully tells Jason what she did at the airport and, disgusted with her, Jason returns to Weatherfield alone and tells Gail what really happened. Gail feels terrible, and apologises to David for not believing him. David is still angry with her, and continues to make poisonous jibes. Gail feels as though she deserves it after what she had done.

In March 2008, David's new girlfriend Tina McIntyre (Michelle Keegan) tells Gail that she is pregnant with David's baby. Believing that neither of them is ready for parenthood, Gail offers to pay for Tina to have an abortion and to keep it from David, which Tina accepts. However, David soon finds out and is angry with Gail. He goes to pack his bags. Gail begs him not to go and tries to explain her reasons, but David doesn't want to know and pushes her away from him. She is at the top of the stairs and has a terrible fall resulting in her being hospitalised and suffering from short-term amnesia. Gail eventually remembers who pushed her but forgives David, believing she pushed him to it. However, believing that he should be punished for nearly killing his mother, David began smashing up windows in the street, attacks Ken Barlow and assaults a police officer, resulting in him spending several weeks in prison. Ted Page (Michael Byrne), Gail's long lost father, gets in touch with Audrey. Gail finds out and is angry that she was not told. However, she arranges to meet Ted after he discovers he has a daughter, three grandchildren, and one great-grandchild.

Gail takes a shine to Tina's father, Joe McIntyre (Reece Dinsdale), and they start dating. Joe later proposes to Gail on a boat he has renovated. However, Gail is unaware that Joe is deeply in debt, as his business has collapsed and is frequently visited by a debt collector. Gail marries Joe in January 2010 despite his debt. While Gail and Joe are on holiday the next month, Joe tries to fake his own death for the life insurance money. He tells Gail, who is horrified, and asks him to go to the police, but they argue on the boat and Joe falls, spraining his wrist. The fight is witnessed by another couple. Joe eventually manages to push Gail back on to the dock and he sets sail. Shortly afterwards, Joe is knocked from the boat and drowns, but Gail thinks he has gone ahead with his plan so she calls David and tells him about Joe's plan and they agree to tell people that Joe has got a job in the Lake District, thinking he will return. They take Joe's boat in from the lake and go home. Gail is devastated when Joe's body is found. However, the police find many inconsistencies in her story, especially when the couple from the lakes come forward as witnesses. She is arrested during Joe's wake for his murder and later charged after an indignant Tina tells the police that Gail intends to visit her daughter in Milan and that she asked Tina to lie to them. Consequently, Gail is denied bail and her trial is scheduled for three months later. Gail fears the worst, especially when former neighbour Tracy Barlow (Kate Ford) makes a false testimony against her claiming that Gail admitted in their prison cell to killing Joe with a rolling pin, but is relieved when she is found not guilty.

Gail learns that David is engaged to Kylie Turner (Paula Lane) and is against the marriage. Once David and Kylie are married, Gail later warms to the marriage and allows them both to continue living with her. Gail and Audrey bump into Audrey's ex-boyfriend, professional con artist Lewis Archer (Nigel Havers). They report him to the police, but he is not charged and returns to Weatherfield, much to Audrey's horror. They reconcile, much to Gail's disgust, and live happily together. Lewis also gets a job at Nick's Bistro. However, Gail is sure that, sooner or later, Lewis will hurt Audrey, and so she plots with Gloria Price (Sue Johnston) to get proof that Lewis is really in love with Audrey. Audrey, however, finds out about this and doesn't stop them, and so, when Lewis realises that she knew, he leaves her. Wanting revenge, he later fools Gail into falling in love with him and they plan to remortgage her house and buy a hotel business in Italy. After telling her family this, and with Audrey and David disgusted, Lewis (by text) instructs Gail to turn on the DVD of "Italian for Lovers", which David does. To the family's horror, Lewis has hacked her bank account, taken the money and left the country.

Gail meets a man named Michael Rodwell (Les Dennis), who turns up at her house pretending to be a "gas man", who has come to the house to look at the "gas leak". He is revealed as a burglar and pushes Gail, causing her to fall over, and Kylie chases him out onto the street, but he gets into his van and drives off. Gail starts to become anxious when she is home alone owing to the burglary and is helped by David, Kylie and Audrey. However, Gail and Michael gradually grow close as Gail helps him to rebuild his life, and she begins to stick up for him in front of David and Kylie. Eventually, Michael moves in with her.

In January 2015, Michael proposes to Gail; however, she is taken aback by the proposal and Michael is scared that he had rushed into things and that she would leave him. That evening at the bistro, Gail turns the tables and proposes to Michael. The celebrations are cut short when Michael collapses and is rushed to Weatherfield General. He later discovers he will require open heart surgery. When Sarah returns to Weatherfield in March 2015, she meets Michael, but rudely refers to him as the "burglar" before shaking hands. Gail and Michael are eventually married in April 2015.

However, in June 2015, after Michael receives a photo album from his former wife Susan detailing the life of their son Gavin, it is revealed to Michael that Andy Carver has been posing as his son and the real Gavin is dead. Michael is horrified to learn that Gail (as well as David and Andy's girlfriend Steph) knew about the fake identity and aided Andy in keeping the lie secret. Michael walks out on Gail. Unable to forgive her, Michael later demands a divorce and moves in with his new friend Eileen Grimshaw. Later, Michael tells Gail that he and Eileen shared a kiss, and Gail and Eileen end up fighting in the street. In July, Gail is upset when Michael and Eileen begin a relationship.

Gail stands by David and Kylie when Max's biological father, Callum Logan (Sean Ward), begins terrorising the family, as he wants custody of Max. Gail tries to co-operate with Callum's own mother, Marion, but the mediation sessions between him and David end in failure, worsening the situation as time goes on. After Max says he saw Callum and some other gangsters beating up Jason, Gail forces him out of the house when he stops by for one of his impromptu visits, only for Max to tell Callum he wishes he was dead, leading to Callum chasing Max into the road. Max is then hit by Nick in a van. Thankfully, he recovers. Gail's hatred for Callum reaches new heights when he has thugs raid Audrey's salon. Following this, Callum suddenly disappears, and Gail assumes he has decided to leave the family alone from now on.

In September 2015, as uncertainty grows about the future living situation at No.8, Gail and David agree to convert the garage into a "granny annexe" for Gail to live in. After it is finished, Gail discovers there is damp underneath the floor. This eventually dissipates, but Gail begins to notice David, Kylie and Sarah acting out of the ordinary. She passes it off and officially moves into the annexe. However, in January 2016, Gail tells David and Kylie she wants underfloor heating for her annexe. She gets Jason to take a look at it, but David, frustrated, stops him from doing so, raising Gail's evermore suspicions about her son's temperament.

In 2016, it is revealed that there is a decomposed body in the manhole underneath Gail's annexe after a car crash involving Tyrone Dobbs (Alan Halsall) and Fiz Stape (Jennie McAlpine). The body is later revealed as Callum Logan, who has been missing for a couple of months. Gail considered her family responsible for the murder, but looked past it after it was later said that Jason's father, Tony Stewart (Terence Maynard), was "guilty" of murdering him.

Gail's daughter Sarah begins experiencing mental issues after believing that Callum isn't dead and is still on the run and coming to kill her. Billy Mayhew's (Daniel Brocklebank) brother Lee ends up kidnapping Sarah before she goes into hospital, telling her that Callum is indeed "alive". Sarah angers him by pushing him into a table, injuring him. Lee pushes her, and looks as though he is going to rape her. David kicks open the door and saves her from him. Sarah then goes into hospital leaving her newborn baby, Harry, with Gail's daughter-in-law, Kylie. Michael also later reconciles with Gail after splitting with Eileen, and moves back into No 8.

In July 2016, Gail's son David and his wife Kylie agree to leave Weatherfield and move to Barbados with Kylie's half-sister Becky McDonald (Katherine Kelly). This is cancelled because of the sudden death of Kylie after she is stabbed by Clayton Hibbs (Callum Harrison) while protecting her friend, Gemma Winter (Dolly Rose-Campbell). Gail and her family, especially David, Max and Lily, grieve following this. This experience makes Gail remember her first husband, Brian, who was fatally stabbed nearly thirty years before.

In October 2016, Gail is horrified by David, as he tries to kill Clayton and himself by crashing into a police van with his car full of petrol and by igniting it. Gail later finds a suicide video by David, stating that he does not want to upset the kids, but is doing this for Kylie. Gail's method of preventing David from killing himself is to trap him in the Bistro's wine cellar during the trial.

David later escapes the cellar and ends up crashing into Gary Windass (Mikey North) and his own daughter, Lily. They both survive, but Gary's mother, Anna Windass (Debbie Rush), gets caught in the flames after she falls into a petrol puddle and ends up receiving serious burns to her legs. Gail understands not to ask David further questions, as he feels terrible about it all.

In November 2016, Michael is found dead after Pat Phelan (Connor McIntyre) allows him to die of a heart attack. Gail is devastated, and she and Eileen put aside their differences for Michael's funeral. Michael is cremated off-screen, and Gail scatters his ashes into a pond near to where they were planning to renew their vows.

In January 2017, Gail's granddaughter Bethany begins dating an older man, Nathan Curtis (Christopher Harper), who ends up being with her only to exploit and groom her. At the same time, David becomes involved with new girl Shona Ramsey (Julia Goulding), who is also involved with Nathan.

Gail begins pairing up David and Maria after believing that they have feelings for each other and are the "perfect match". David and Maria find out about Gail's plans and agree to mess with her. They pretend to be engaged and in love, and later take it to the next level and pretend that Maria is pregnant with David's baby. Audrey discovers that they are lying to them and tells Gail. Gail pretends to organise the wedding and David tells her that it is all a joke. Gail discovers that Bethany has been involved in a sex ring and is horrified. Nick decides to leave Weatherfield for good, because he has nothing left there. He and Gail have a touching moment together. David and Shona get closer and share a kiss in hospital. This annoys Gail, because she knows that Shona is the mother of Kylie's killer Clayton. She warns Shona to stay away and even offers her £600 to make her move away. Shona ends up telling David the truth and she leaves Weatherfield after being upset by David. David finds out that Gail knew about everything and kicks her out of his house, but eventually lets her back in.

On Christmas Day 2024, Gail married Jesse Chadwick (John Thomson) and they left Weatherfield to start a new life in France.

== Reception ==
In March 2000, Inside Soap ran a poll asking readers if Martin should stay with Gail or leave to be with Rebecca, with 52% of readers voting that Martin should stay with his family and 48% voting that he should leave Gail. The magazine called Gail the "grumpy wife" of Martin and added, "it was a tough call but the majority of you [readers] don't want to see another soap family torn apart and think he should stay and work things out". On 25 May 2014, Worth won "Outstanding Achievement Award" at The British Soap Awards 2014 for her portrayal of Gail over the last 40 years. On 9 June 2014, a 30-minute documentary entitled "Gail & Me: 40 Years on Coronation Street" was aired on ITV at 20:00 dedicated to Worth's 40 years on the soap. In the show, Worth was reunited with past actors Brian Capron (Richard Hillman) and Amanda Barrie (Alma Halliwell), and spoke out about Gail's most controversial storylines.
