= Jill Halfpenny =

British actress (born 1975)

- Born: 15 July 1975 (age 50); Gateshead, Tyne and Wear, England
- Occupations: Actress; voiceover artist
- Years active: 1989–present
- Spouse: Craig Conway (m. 2007; div. 2010)
- Children: 1
- Relatives: Chelsea Halfpenny (niece)

Jill Halfpenny (born 15 July 1975) is an English actress who first garnered attention playing Nicola Dobson in the coming-of-age drama series Byker Grove (1989–1992). She became more widely known for her roles as Rebecca Hopkins on the soap opera Coronation Street (1999–2000), Kate Mitchell on the soap opera EastEnders (2002–2005), and Izzie Redpath in Waterloo Road (2006–2007). Her other notable credits include Babylon (2014), In the Club (2014–2016), Humans (2015), Three Girls (2017), Liar (2017–2020), Dark Money (2019), The Drowning (2021), and The Long Shadow (2023). She won the second series of the television dance contest Strictly Come Dancing in 2004.

For her portrayal of Paulette Bonafonté in the original West End run of Legally Blonde (2010–2011), Halfpenny received the Olivier Award for Best Supporting Actress in a Musical. Her other stage credits include Chicago (West End, 2005), Calendar Girls (West End, 2009), Abigail's Party (West End, 2012), Way Upstream (Chichester Festival Theatre, 2015), The Girl on the Train (Leeds Playhouse, 2018), and A Taste of Honey (Royal Exchange, 2024). Her memoir, A Life Reimagined, was published by Pan Macmillan in 2024.

== Career ==
=== 1989–2004: Television debut, soap roles, and Strictly Come Dancing ===
Halfpenny began her professional career in 1989 when she joined the cast of the Newcastle-based children's drama series Byker Grove, playing the part of Nicola Dobson until 1992. Following guest star appearances on shows such as The Bill, Birds of a Feather, and Peak Practice, she landed the part of staff nurse Rebecca Hopkins on ITV's Coronation Street; a role she played between 1999 and 2000. The character was involved in a high-profile affair storyline with Martin Platt, eventually leading to the breakdown of Platt's marriage.

In December 2002, Halfpenny took on the role of Kate Mitchell on BBC One's EastEnders. The character—an undercover policewoman—was introduced as a honeytrap for Phil Mitchell, with the intent of coaxing him into a murder confession; her cover was eventually blown and, having fallen in love with him, she became Mitchell's wife. It was revealed in October 2004 that the character had been axed, with her final scenes airing in January the following year.

Between October and December 2004, Halfpenny competed in the second series of the celebrity ballroom dancing contest Strictly Come Dancing, where she was paired with professional dancer Darren Bennett. The couple were crowned the winners of the competition during its live final on 11 December 2004, after receiving the maximum 40 marks from the judging panel. That same week, it was announced that Halfpenny would star as Roxie Hart in the West End musical Chicago, beginning in January 2005.

=== 2005–2017: Stage roles, Waterloo Road, and presenting work ===
Halfpenny earned critical praise for her performance in The Bodies, a play adapted from an Émile Zola novel by Peter Flannery, which ran from June to July 2005 at Newcastle's Live Theatre. Describing her work as the "dangerously crazed" Thérèse, The Guardian commented, "Halfpenny, forced to remain impassive at the outset, is tough and moving in her portrayal of [the character's] descent into madness". Next, she made a cameo appearance as a Geordie nanny on The Catherine Tate Show; guest-starred on Channel 4's Shameless as a violent ex-jailbird; hosted the debut episode of the BBC musical theatre tribute The Sound of Musicals, where she performed songs from My Fair Lady and Moulin Rouge!; and began playing the regular part of schoolteacher Izzie Redpath on the BBC's Waterloo Road, for which she won the 2007 TV Quick Award for "Best Actress". The character was later killed in an accidental stabbing during the finale of the show's second series, which aired on 26 April 2007. That same year, she narrated the BBC Three documentary series Freaky Eaters and the Channel 4 one-off special Fat Man's Warning.

Halfpenny appeared as Norma Farnes—Spike Milligan's long-suffering manager—in Richard Harris's Surviving Spike, which opened at the Theatre Royal, Windsor in February 2008. In his review for The Independent, critic Julian Hall felt that Halfpenny's performance "lends added zip to what is already a tightly written play ... [she] successfully evokes the tenacity that Farnes must have had to [endure Milligan]". Her next roles on stage were Cora in Calendar Girls (July to October 2009) and Paulette Bonafonté in the West End production of Legally Blonde, which opened in January 2010. She earned particularly strong notices for her performance in the latter, winning the Theatregoers' Choice Award for Best Supporting Actress in a Musical and the Laurence Olivier Award for Best Performance in a Supporting Role.

In March 2012, Halfpenny headlined a revival of Mike Leigh's 1977 play Abigail's Party at the Menier Chocolate Factory, which later transferred to the West End's Wyndham's Theatre for four months. Her portrayal of the snobbish Beverly was warmly received, with The Guardian's Kate Kellaway calling her "fantastic", adding: "[she] perfectly catches Bev's dark side – her selfishness, sexual frustration and dangerous stupidity". She then portrayed the matriarch of a 1940s household in the supernatural horror miniseries Lightfields, which aired between February and March 2013.

Halfpenny featured in two major television projects in 2014: first, the Kay Mellor-produced BBC One drama series In the Club, where she played an expectant first-time mother, and then Channel 4's seven-part satirical comedy series Babylon, in which she co-starred as PC Davina Bancroft. In September that same year, she narrated a segment on the history of North East England as part of the televised opening ceremony for the Great North Run. She then appeared as a timid middle-class holidaymaker in Alan Ayckbourn's Way Upstream at Chichester Festival Theatre (April to May 2015), and played one of the principal characters—Jill Drummond, a disabled woman who falls for her humanoid caregiver—on the first season of the science fiction drama series Humans, which aired between June and August 2015. Described as a "stylishly slow-burning Sunday night treat" by The Telegraph, Humans was Channel 4's highest-rated drama in two decades, attracting an average of 6m viewers.

Halfpenny made her radio broadcast debut in May 2017, covering slots on BBC Radio 2 for regular presenters such as Liza Tarbuck and Sara Cox, and later hosting the station's Good Morning Sunday show throughout August 2018. Her acting projects during this period included the controversial BBC miniseries Three Girls, an examination of the events surrounding the Rochdale child sex abuse ring. Airing over three consecutive nights in May 2017, the drama received a positive reception, with Halfpenny's portrayal of Julie Winshaw—a fictionalised version of one of the parents whose teenage child was exploited—garnering praise.

=== 2018–2023: Theatre and television ===
In the stage adaptation of the psychological thriller novel The Girl on the Train, Halfpenny headlined as Rachel, a dispirited alcoholic who witnesses a murder but struggles to convince people of what she saw. Premiering at the Leeds Playhouse in May 2018, the production was met with mixed reviews, though critics agreed that Halfpenny was its biggest asset, with The Yorkshire Post commenting that she "steals the show ... Her role requires a nuanced performance that keeps the audience guessing [and] it's one she delivers with great aplomb". The following year, she starred as a conflicted parent who accepts hush money after her 13-year-old son is molested by a Hollywood film producer, in the four-part BBC miniseries Dark Money.

In Channel 5's The Drowning, a mystery thriller that aired over four consecutive nights in February 2021, Halfpenny starred as Jodie Walsh, a grief-stricken mother who comes to believe that her late son may still be alive. In her appraisal of the show for The Guardian, Lucy Mangan said of Halfpenny, "Her presence is always a sign that a programme will be an elevated production. Here, her inability to strike a false or melodramatic note is perfect for the [character]". Next, she played the supporting role of Doreen Hill in The Long Shadow, a seven-part miniseries—based on the crimes of serial killer Peter Sutcliffe—that aired on ITV1 between September and November 2023. Radio Times critic James Hibbs was effusive in his praise of the show's "strong" cast, calling them "real, fully rounded individuals" and adding, "Everyone brings their A-game in wholly different ways, [including] Halfpenny as the grieving mother of one of Sutcliffe's victims". Speaking of the research she undertook in preparation for playing Hill, Halfpenny said it was the lack of aftercare for the victims that shocked her most: "They were just left to deal with such tragic circumstances [and] in such a public arena, with seemingly no support ... It just really shocked me that they were just left alone, and how little power they had ... We talk so much now about support and therapy and what could we give them and how can we help them. [Back then] it was like, 'Oh, well, that's happened'. I thought it was heartbreaking".

=== 2024–present: Acting work and memoir ===
Halfpenny's role in the 2024 adaptation of Shelagh Delaney's A Taste of Honey, which debuted at the Royal Exchange, Manchester on 15 March, was met with praise; writing for The Daily Telegraph, critic Mark Brown believed her portrayal of working-class single mother Helen to be "suitably monstrous, but with an intelligent, underlying and brittle fragility". Her next project was Channel 5's The Cuckoo, in which she played the mysterious Sian, a lodger hiding a dark secret from the family she's living with. Emily Watkins of The i Paper called the miniseries—which premiered in April 2024—"well-paced [and] acted", noting that Halfpenny's "flinty gaze" lent her character "a chilling intensity".

It was announced in February 2024 that Halfpenny's memoir, A Life Reimagined, would be published by Pan Macmillan. Touching upon the deaths of her father and her ex-partner, it was released in June that same year and reached the Sunday Times bestseller list.

In Girl Taken (2026), Halfpenny played the alcohol-dependent mother of a missing teenager, with The Guardian commenting that she "[brings] her all" to the role. The six-part thriller series debuted on Paramount+ in January that year. She then starred as DS Sam Bradley on the second season of ITV's After the Flood, also premiering in January 2026.

== Other work ==
Halfpenny has narrated commercials for Argos, Children in Need, Ford Fiesta, The Sunday Times, Aunt Bessie's, Cocoa Pops, the Royal Air Force, First Choice, and Caledonian Travel.

== Personal life ==
Halfpenny was born in Leam Lane, Gateshead, Tyne and Wear on 15 July 1975.

She married fellow actor Craig Conway in 2007; together they have a son, Harvey. The couple divorced in 2010. In 2019, Halfpenny spoke of her grief following the death of her partner, Matt Janes, two years earlier. He died aged 43 after suffering a heart attack.

Halfpenny is an ambassador for Kidscape, a children's charity. She was named "Freeman of the Borough of Gateshead" in 2013, in recognition of her services to theatre, television, and charity.

== Filmography ==
=== Film ===
Year	Title	Role	Notes
2000	Command Approved	Chopper Pilot	
2011	How to Stop Being a Loser	Christina	
2013	Turn Your Bloody Phone Off: The Second Batch	Mummy	Short; Segment: "Shush Mummy"
2016	Maisie	Louise	Short
2017	Ghost Stories	Peggy Van Rhys (voice)	
2018	Walk Like a Panther	Lara Anderson	
2019	Colourblind	Mum	Short

=== Television ===
Year	Title	Role	Notes
1989–1992	Byker Grove	Nicola Dobson	Series regular (seasons 1–4)
1997	The Bill	Lisa Collett	Episode: "Man Trap"
1997	Birds of a Feather	Brittany	Episode: "Rising Damp"
1997	The Lakes	Tina	Episode #1.1
1998	The Round Tower	Rosie Cotton	Television film
1998	Heartbeat	Mitzi Wyler	Episode: "Local Knowledge"
1998	Touching Evil	Annie Jordan	Episode: "What Price a Child" Parts 1 & 2
1999	Dangerfield	Shelley	Episode: "Tying the Knot"
1999	Peak Practice	Kelly	Recurring (series 8)
1999–2000	Coronation Street	Rebecca Hopkins	Series regular
2001	Dalziel and Pascoe	Tara Connolly	Episode: "Home Truths"
2002	Breeze Block	Gail	Main role
2002–2005	EastEnders	Kate Mitchell	Series regular
2003	Barbara	Kirsty	Episode: "Kirsty"
2004	Strictly Come Dancing	Contestant	Series 2 winner
2005	The Catherine Tate Show	Gina	Episode: "Dog Obedience"
2006	Shameless	Roxy Benson	Episode: "Old Flame"
2006–2007	Waterloo Road	Izzie Redpath	Series regular (series 1–2)
2007	Blue Murder	Jackie Holroyd	Episode: "Crisis Management"
2009	Inspector George Gently	Cora Davidson	Episode: "Gently with the Innocents"
2011	Mount Pleasant	Emma	Recurring (series 1)
2011	Walk Like a Panther	Lara Anderson	Episode #1.1
2012	Murdoch Mysteries	Elizabeth Bryant	Episode: "Murdoch of the Klondike"
2012	Wild at Heart	Fiona	Recurring (series 7)
2013	Lightfields	Martha Felwood	Main role
2013	Vera	Maggie Warnock	Episode: "Prodigal Son"
2014	Babylon	Davina	Main role
2014	Beautality	Pam St. Clair	Television film
2014–2016	In the Club	Diane Manning	Main role
2015	Humans	Jill Drummond	Main role (series 1)
2016	Death in Paradise	Naomi Walker	Episode: "The Blood Red Sea"
2016	Ordinary Lies	Belinda Brierly	Episode: "Joe"
2017	Three Girls	Julie Winshaw	Main role
2017–2020	Liar	Jennifer	Recurring (series 1–2)
2019	Year of the Rabbit	Flora Wilson	3 episodes
2019	Dark Money	Sam Mensah	Main role
2020	Inside No. 9	Jennie	Episode: "Misdirection"
2021	The Drowning	Jodie Walsh	Main role
2022	Jill Halfpenny's Easter Journeys	Presenter	Documentary miniseries
2022	The Holiday	Kate Fitzgerald	Main role
2022	Everything I Know About Love	Roisin	Main role
2023	The Long Shadow	Doreen Hill	3 episodes
2024	The Cuckoo	Sian Gregson	Main role
2024	The Red King	Ann Fletcher	Episode #1.2
2025	The Feud	Emma Bartlett	Main role
2025	Daddy Issues	Davina	2 episodes (Series 2)
2026	Girl Taken	Eve Riser	Main role
2026	After the Flood	DS Sam Bradley	Main role
2026	Number One Fan	Lucy Logan	4 episodes

=== Voice work ===
Selected voiceover credits
Year	Title	Role	Notes
2007	Freaky Eaters	Narrator	Series 1
2007	Fat Man's Warning	Narrator	Documentary
2011	Jamie: Drag Queen at 16	Narrator	Documentary
2013	Shoplife	Narrator	Documentary
2013	Shut-ins: Britain's Fattest People	Narrator	Documentary
2015	Britain's Horror Homes	Narrator	Series 1
2017	Shut-ins: Britain's Fattest Woman	Narrator	Documentary
2017–2018	The Liza Tarbuck Show; The Sara Cox Show; Good Morning Sunday	Host	Recurring; BBC Radio 2
2018	Stone	Jackie Stanton-Hope	Main role (series 7); BBC Radio 4
2019	When Plastic Surgery Goes Horribly Wrong	Narrator	Documentary
2020	Body Horror	Caroline	Main role; BBC Radio 4
2020	The Estate: Life Up North	Narrator	Documentary miniseries
2020–2022	Elephant Hospital	Narrator	Documentary series
2022	The Magpie	Narrator	Audiobook (author: Marrisse Whittaker)
2022	Vengeance Is Mine	Narrator	Audiobook (author: Michael Wood)
2022	Trouble at Topshop	Narrator	Documentary miniseries
2022	Northern Justice	Narrator	Documentary series
2022–2023	Geordie Hospital	Narrator	Documentary series
2022–2023	Hotel Benidorm: Sun, Sea & Sangria	Narrator	Documentary series
2024	A Life Reimagined	Narrator	Audiobook (author: Jill Halfpenny)

== Theatre ==
Selected theatre credits
Year	Title	Role	Notes
—N/a	The Sound of Music	Liesl von Trapp	Crucible Theatre
1995	Like a Virgin	Angela	Hull Truck Theatre
1999	Jumping the Waves	—N/a	ARC Theatre
2001	Studs	Mandy	Hull Truck Theatre
2001	Cooking with Elvis	Jill	National tour
2002	1984	Julia	Northern Stage
2005	Chicago	Roxie Hart	Adelphi Theatre
2005	The Bodies	Thérèse Raquin	Live Theatre
2005–2006	Cinderella	Fairy Godmother	Theatre Royal, Newcastle
2006–2007	Jack and the Beanstalk	Mother Nature	Theatre Royal, Newcastle
2007	Uncle Vanya	Sonya	Birmingham Rep
2008	Surviving Spike	Norma Farnes	Theatre Royal, Windsor
2009	Calendar Girls	Cora	Noël Coward Theatre
2010	Legally Blonde	Paulette Bonafonté	Savoy Theatre
2010	Jill Halfpenny Celebrates the Great British Songbook	Host	Wilton's Music Hall
2012	Abigail's Party	Julia	Menier Chocolate Factory; Wyndham's Theatre
2015	Way Upstream	Emma	Chichester Festival Theatre
2018	The Girl on the Train	Rachel	Leeds Playhouse
2019	In a Word	Fiona	Young Vic
2024	A Taste of Honey	Helen	Royal Exchange Theatre
2026	Private Lives	Amanda Prynne	Royal Exchange Theatre

== Accolades ==
Year	Award	Category	Work	Result	Ref.
2004	British Soap Awards	Sexiest Female	EastEnders	Nominated	
2007	TV Quick Awards	Best Actress	Waterloo Road	Won	
2011	Theatregoers' Choice Awards	Best Supporting Actress in a Musical	Legally Blonde	Won	
2011	Laurence Olivier Awards	Best Performance in a Supporting Role in a Musical	Legally Blonde	Won	
