= Blackley Jewish Cemetery =

Jewish cemetery in Manchester

- Interactive map of Blackley Jewish Cemetery

Details
- Location: 1106 Rochdale Rd, Blackley, Manchester M9 6FQ
- Country: England, United Kingdom
- Coordinates: 53°31′47″N 2°12′32″W
- Owned by: North Manchester Jewish Cemeteries Trust
- Website: Official website

Blackley Jewish Cemetery is a Jewish cemetery in Blackley, north Manchester, England. It is managed by the North Manchester Jewish Cemeteries Trust. The cemetery was opened in 1897 by the then Manchester Central Synagogue, and afterwards was shared with the North Manchester Synagogue. The two synagogues merged in 1978.

== Notable burials ==
- Morris Cohen (1887– 1970), better known as Two-Gun Cohen, is buried here. He was a Polish-born British and Canadian adventurer of Jewish origin who became aide-de-camp to Sun Yat-sen and a major-general in the Chinese National Revolutionary Army.
- Jack White (born Jacob Weiss; 1896–1949), who was awarded the Victoria Cross in 1917 for his bravery in the First World War, is buried at the cemetery.
- Fourteen British or Commonwealth servicemen who died in the First World War are buried here, and eight from the Second World War. One American serviceman (Private Harry Noveck) who died in the First World War is also buried here.

== See also ==
- Blackley Cemetery
