= Peter Dudley =

English actor

- Born: 21 June 1935; Manchester, England
- Died: 20 October 1983 (aged 48); Salford, England
- Occupation: Actor
- Years active: 1960s–1983

Peter Dudley (21 June 1935 – 20 October 1983) was an English character actor best known for his role as Bert Tilsley in the ITV soap opera Coronation Street; a role he played from 1979 until his death in 1983.

== Early life ==
Peter Dudley was born on 21 June 1935 in Manchester, England. He was the son of Charles and Jane (née Joyce) Dudley, and had two brothers and two sisters.

As a child, Dudley harboured a desire to become an actor, but after leaving school, he began his working life as a doffer in a local mill. However, this only job lasted two days. He then took a job in a grocer's shop before he joined the Bolton Hippodrome where he stayed for six months. Dudley then worked as a window dresser and a salesman before doing his national service with the army.

== Career ==
After leaving the army, Dudley returned to acting with the Oldham Repertory Company and at the University Theatre in Manchester. He also became a leading actor with Manchester's Library Theatre Company. He made his first appearances on the soap opera Coronation Street in the late 1960s, first playing a waiter and later a delivery man.

Dudley appeared in a small part as a lorry driver in the film The Ragman's Daughter in 1972 and on television in The Siege of Golden Hill, Against The Crowd, Have Bird Will Travel, Here I Stand, Shabby Tiger, Strangers and Crown Court throughout the 1970s. He played two further small roles in Coronation Street during this time, as Duggie Bowker in 1973 and as Donald Anderson in 1978. After these bit parts, Dudley was eventually cast as series regular Bert Tilsley, appearing from January 1979 onwards. Bert was the husband of Ivy Tilsley (played by Lynne Perrie) and father of Brian Tilsley (played by Christopher Quinten).

== Court case and decline in health ==
Dudley was openly gay to the cast and crew of Coronation Street. In 1981, he was observed exposing himself to another man in a public toilet in Didsbury, Manchester and was arrested and charged with importuning. Following the arrest, Coronation Street producer Bill Podmore allowed him to continue to appear in the series. Dudley pleaded guilty and was fined £200. Some months later, he was charged again with gross indecency for an alleged similar offence, though this time he claimed he was not guilty and had been set up by the police. Dudley chose to be tried in the Crown Court rather than a magistrates' court, which prolonged the affair and made it highly public. A jury failed to agree on a verdict and the judge ordered a retrial. The strain became too much and Dudley suffered a stroke, losing much of the use of his left side, and briefly his speech. The retrial was postponed but the case kept open.

Dudley spent time in physiotherapy but wanted to continue to act in Coronation Street, so a storyline of Bert being injured falling off a ladder at work and suffering a mini-stroke was devised. Although his disabilities were largely hidden, it was clear the actor was unwell. Dudley was then written out of the show in mid 1983 so that he could prepare for his pending retrial, but before the second trial was heard, he suffered two heart attacks and a further stroke.

== Death ==
Dudley died as a result of his stroke on 20 October 1983 in Salford Royal Hospital, at the age of 48. He was survived by his father and four siblings. Coincidentally, Dudley's co-star Perrie, who played his screen wife, was also briefly admitted to the same hospital after experiencing chest pains the day before he died. Later, upon learning of his death, she was said to be "devastated". Co-star Eileen Derbyshire, who played Emily Bishop in the series, stated she would remember Dudley as "full of vitality, fun and laughter, despite his personal problems."

Dudley lived at Porchfield Square in Deansgate, Manchester.

Dudley was cremated at Blackley Crematorium, Manchester on 25 October 1983. The service was conducted by Canon Peter Vowles, and was attended by his father, four siblings, Helen Worth, who played Dudley's on screen daughter in law Gail Tilsley, and other members of the wider Coronation Street cast, while 500 fans paid their respects outside. No one wore dark clothes, at Dudley's request, and a guitar instrumental of "Over the Rainbow" was played.
