= Jack White (VC) =

British recipient of the Victoria Cross

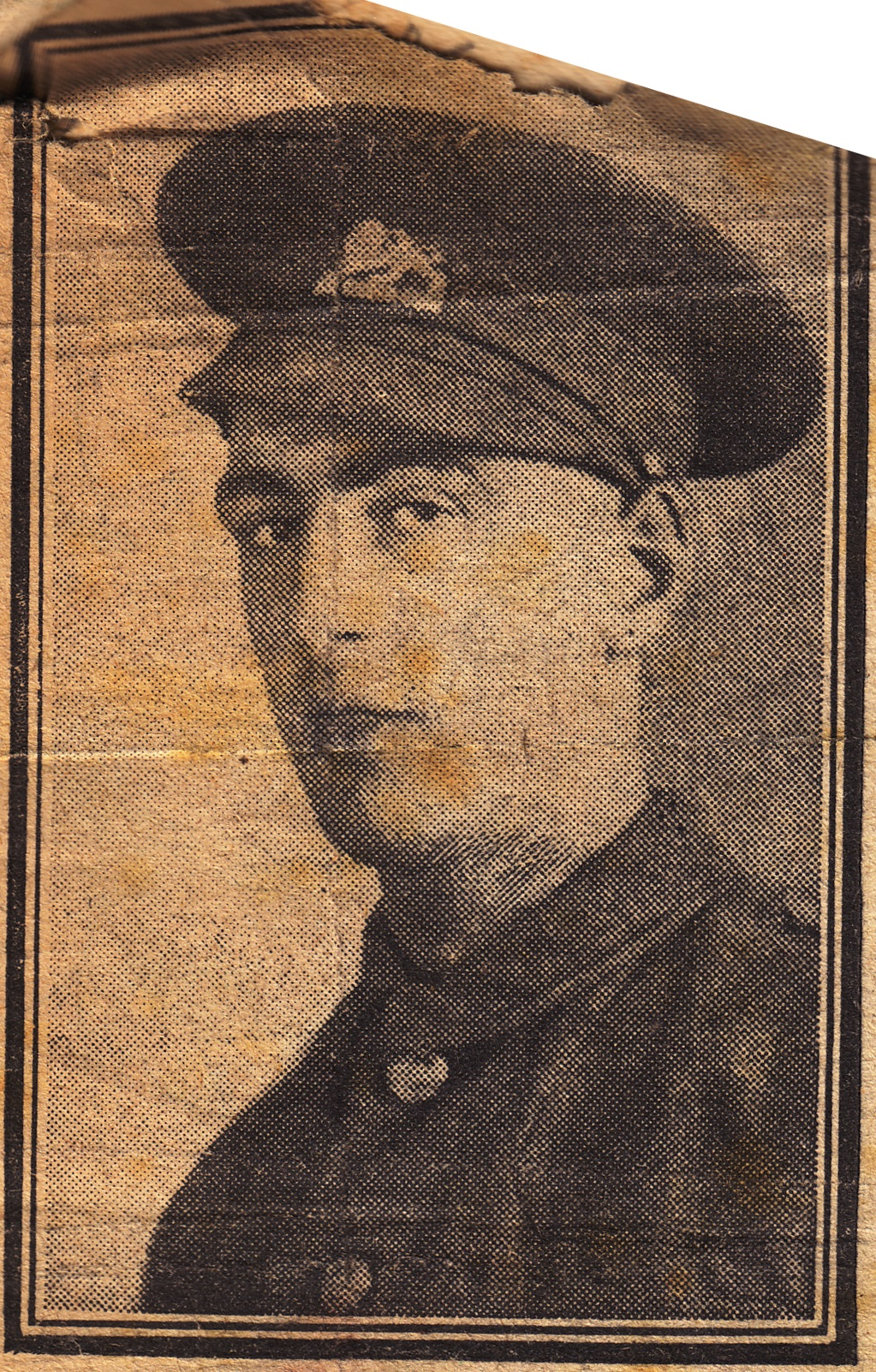
- Born: Jacob Weiss; 23 December 1896; Leeds, West Riding of Yorkshire, England
- Died: 27 November 1949 (aged 52); Salford, Lancashire, England
- Burial place: Blackley Cemetery
- Spouse: May Daniels (m. 1921)
- Military career
- Allegiance: United Kingdom
- Branch: British Army
- Service years: 1914 - 1919
- Rank: Lance corporal
- Service number: 18105
- Units: King's Own Royal Regiment (Lancaster)
- Conflicts: World War I
- Awards: Victoria Cross

Jack White VC (born Jacob Weiss; 23 December 1896 – 27 November 1949) was a British recipient of the Victoria Cross, the highest and most prestigious award for gallantry in the face of the enemy that can be awarded to British and Commonwealth forces.

== Background ==
White was born Jacob Weiss in Leeds on 23 December 1896 into an immigrant Russian Jewish family. After finishing his education, he joined the family business, a waterproofing company. When the First World War broke out, he returned home from a business trip and volunteered for active service with the King's Own Royal Regiment (Lancaster). Originally assigned to a battalion destined for France, he missed the battalion's deployment while home on compassionate leave to attend the funeral of his father. Instead, he was transferred to the 6th (Service) Battalion, King's Own Royal Regiment (Lancaster).

The 6th Bn was attached to the 13th (Western) Division. Originally ordered to Gallipoli, he remained with the battalion through the Gallipoli campaign. Eventually, he and his unit were ordered to join the Tigris Corps, attempting to relieve the Siege of Kut. After the failure of the relief effort, White's unit participated in the counter-offensive in 1917. It was during the 13th Division's crossing of the Diyala River that he earned the Victoria Cross.

== Details ==
White was 20 years old, and a private when, on 7/8 March 1917 on the Dialah River, Mesopotamia, the following deed took place for which he was awarded the VC. This citation was gazetted on 27 June 1917:

War Office, 27th June, 1917.

His Majesty the KING has been graciously pleased to approve of the award of the Victoria Cross to the undermentioned Officer, Warrant Officer, Non-commissioned Officers and men:—

[...]

No. 18105 Pte. Jack White, R. Lanc. R.

For most conspicuous bravery and resource.

This signaller during an attempt to cross a river saw the two Pontoons ahead of him come under heavy machine-gun fire, with disastrous results.

When his own Pontoon had reached midstream, with every man except himself either dead or wounded, finding that he was unable to control the Pontoon, Pte. White promptly tied a telephone wire to the Pontoon, jumped overboard, and towed it to the shore, thereby saving an officer's life and bringing to land the rifles and equipment of the other men in the boat, who were either dead or dying.

He was also awarded the Italian Bronze Medal of Military Valour.

== Freemasonry ==
He was initiated into Freemasonry in Lodge Montefiore, No. 753, (Glasgow, Scotland) on 2 June 1919. The records show the following entry: 'Jack White (Weiss) VC, Waterproof Maker Commercial. Age 23.'

== Later life ==
White later achieved the rank of lance corporal. Although a Victoria Cross holder he was not permitted to join the Home Guard during World War II because his Russian-born father had failed to be naturalised as a British subject.

After his service, White returned to Manchester and undertook an apprenticeship as a trainee pattern cutter in a local factory. He went on to become General Manager and then Owner before fading health forced him to relinquish his interest and he died in 1949 aged 52.

He was the subject of a comic strip in The Victor published in 1987.
