= Ethel Holdsworth =

British writer

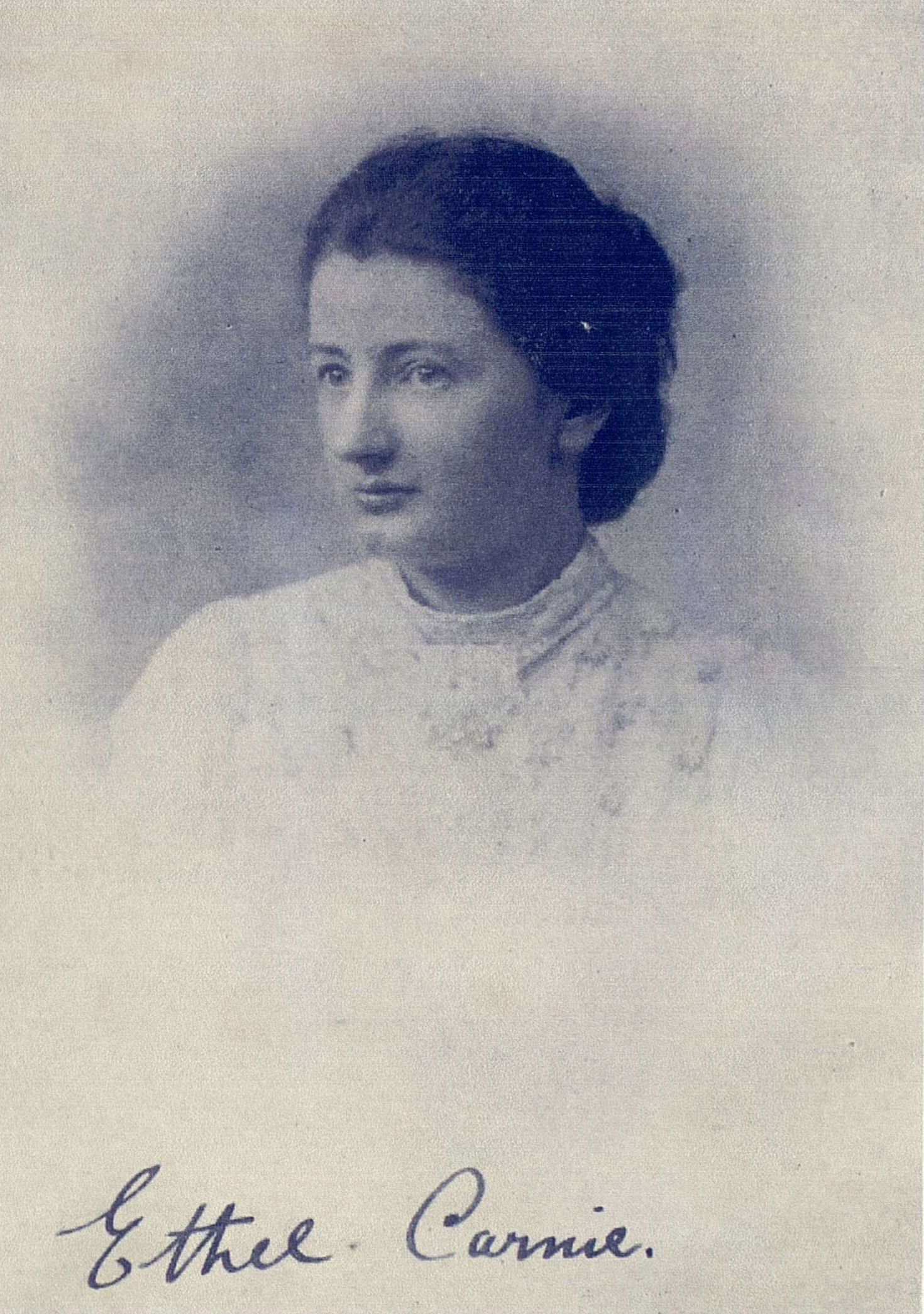
- Ethel Carnie Holdsworth in 1907
- Born: Ethel Carnie; 1 January 1886 near Blackburn, Lancashire, England
- Died: 28 December 1962 (aged 76)
- Resting place: Blackley cemetery, Greater Manchester
- Occupations: Mill worker, novelist, Socialist campaigner
- Spouse: Alfred Holdsworth (m. 1915)
- Children: 2
- Writing career
- Notable works: Rhymes From the Factory (1907), Helen of Four Gates (1917), This Slavery (1925)

Ethel Holdsworth (née Carnie; 1 January 1886 – 28 December 1962) was a working-class British writer, feminist, and socialist activist from Lancashire. A poet, journalist, children's writer and author, she was the first working-class woman in Britain to publish a novel and is a rare example of a female working-class novelist. She published at least ten novels during her lifetime.

== Early life and education ==
Ethel Carnie was born on New Years Day 1886 into a weaving family in Oswaldtwistle, Lancashire. When she was six years old, her parents moved to the growing textile town of Great Harwood, near Blackburn. She started part-time work at Delph Road mill in Great Harwood at aged eleven and was in full-time employment at St. Lawrence Mill from thirteen. In her later articles for the Woman Worker, she described her experience as "slavery".

Holdsworth attended Great Harwood British School from 1892 to 1899. According to Edmund and Ruth Frow, she showed promise in composition and often had her essays read out to the rest of the class, but otherwise showed no outstanding ability. She studied at Owens College (University of Manchester) during the 1911/12 academic session and matriculated on 11 January 1912.

== Literary works ==
Holdsworth started composing poetry while working as a winder at the St. Lawrence mill. Her first book of poems, Rhymes from the Factory, was published in 1907. When this was republished in an enlarged one shilling edition in 1908 she achieved national recognition. Robert Blatchford, proprietor of the Clarion, interviewed Ethel Holdsworth at 76 Windsor Road, Great Harwood, in the summer of 1908 for a feature in one of his newspapers, the Woman Worker. Holdsworth appeared in the newspaper's 'Portrait Gallery' under the title 'A Lancashire Fairy'. Blatchford offered her a job writing articles and poems for the Woman Worker, in London, which she also edited between July and December 1909. She was dismissed after six months for reasons which remain obscure. Edmund and Ruth Frow suggest that her increasingly political and feminist editorials may have caused Blatchford to reassess her input.

A second book of poems, Songs of a Factory Girl, was published in 1911, and her third and final collection of poems, Voices of Womanhood, followed three years later. Holdsworth taught creative writing at Bebel House Women's College and Socialist Education Centre in London in 1913, but returned to Great Harwood before the end of the year. Her first novel, Miss Nobody, was published in the same year.

The children's story "The Blind Prince" (in The Lamp Girl and other stories, 1913) shows the influence of Oscar Wilde. Miss Nobody (1913) was about Carrie Brown who rose from working in a scullery to owning an oyster shop in Ardwick. It was republished in 2013 by Kennedy & Boyd. Helen of Four Gates (1917) was a gothic romance in the Lancashire hills and so popular on publication in the UK that it outsold works by H. G. Wells. It was republished by Kennedy & Boyd in 2016. This Slavery (1925) is Holdsworth's best-known work and is about what happens when sisters Hester and Rachel Martin become unemployed following a fire at the mill where they worked. It was republished by Trent Editions in November 2011, with a critical introduction by Nicola Wilson. General Belinda (1924) has also been republished in 2019 by Kennedy & Boyd. It is about the life of Belinda who takes up domestic service following the death of her father in order to support her mother.

Holdsworth wrote poems and short stories until 1936 but there is no record of her writing after this date. Holdsworth's daughter Margaret told an interviewer that her mother stopped writing because she was worn out and depressed about the imminent outbreak of World War II.

Nicola Wilson and Kathleen Bell are among those leading re-introduction Holdsworth's work to a new generation. Bell writes that

"at its best, Holdsworth's poetry illuminates the gap between working-class people's desire for liberty, often evident in their imaginative capacity, and the constraints and suffering of their lives".

== Political activities ==
Holdsworth protested against the introduction of conscription in World War I and chaired local meetings of the British Citizen Party. During the 1920s she edited and produced The Clear Light, an anti-fascist journal, with her husband Alfred Holdsworth from their home in Slack Top, Hebden Bridge. In this period she also published a series of sonnets in the anarchist journal Freedom, protesting at the imprisonment of anarchists in Soviet jails.

== Legacy ==
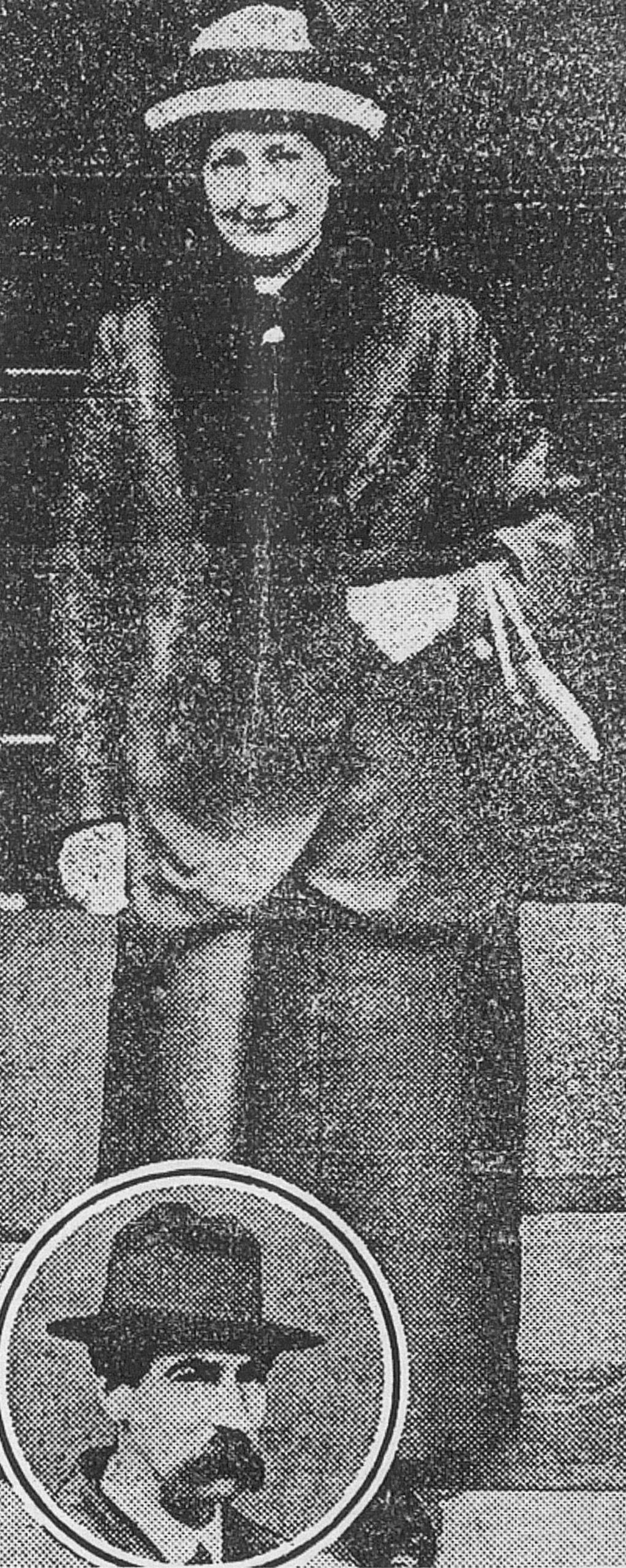
Ethel Carnie Holdsworth on her wedding day in 1915. The inset is Alfred Holdsworth

The composer Ethel Smyth set two of Holdsworth's poems in the song cycle Three Songs (1913). Smyth dedicated "Possession" to Emmeline Pankhurst and "On the Road: a marching tune" to Christabel Pankhurst. The latter song was premiered in 1913 at the Queen's Hall, London.

The novel Helen of Four Gates (1917) was adapted into a successful film of the same name by Cecil Hepworth in 1920. Prints exist in the Cinémathèque Québécoise film archive [35mm positive], the International Museum of Photography and Film at George Eastman House film archive [16mm reduction positive] and in the British Film Institute National Archive. It can be viewed for free via the BFI Player and at BFI Mediatheques.

In 2022, a plaque for Ethel Carnie was unveiled at the former site of Great Harwood British School, as part of the Pendle Radicals local history project.

== Personal life ==
Carnie married poet Alfred Holdsworth in 1915. They had two daughters. She later separated from her husband. From the early 1930s onwards she lived in Cheetham Hill, Manchester.

She died in 1962, aged 76, and is buried in Blackley cemetery, Manchester, in the non-conformists' section (grave A 183).

== Bibliography ==
- Rhymes from the Factory (Blackburn: Denham, 1907)
- Songs of a Factory Girl (London: Headley Brothers, 1911)
- The Lamp Girl, and other stories (London: Headley Brothers, 1913)
- Miss Nobody (London: Methuen, 1913) (Reprinted with new Introduction: Kennedy & Boyd, 2013)
- Voices of Womanhood (London: Headley Brothers, 1914)
- Helen of Four Gates (London: Herbert Jenkins, 1917) (Reprinted with new Introduction: Kennedy & Boyd, 2016)
- The Taming of Nan (London: Herbert Jenkins, 1919)
- The Marriage of Elizabeth (London: Herbert Jenkins, 1920)
- The House that Jill Built (London: Herbert Jenkins, 1920)
- General Belinda (London: Herbert Jenkins, 1924) (Reprinted with new Introduction: Kennedy & Boyd, 2019)
- This Slavery (London: Labour Publishing Company, 1925)
- The Quest of the Golden Garter (London: Herbert Jenkins, 1927)
- Eagles' Crag (London: Stanley Paul, 1928)
- Barbara Dennison (London: Stanley Paul, 1929)
