= List of Coronation Street characters introduced in 1979 =

This is a list of characters that first appeared in Coronation Street in 1979.

== Bert Tilsley ==
Bert Tilsley
- Coronation Street character
- Portrayed by: Peter Dudley
- Duration: 1979–1983
- First appearance: 29 January 1979; Episode 1881
- Last appearance: 27 July 1983; Episode 2329
- Introduced by: Bill Podmore
- Book appearances: Coronation Street: The Complete Saga
In-universe information
- Brothers: Trevor Tilsley
- Sisters: Ethel Latimer; Doris Tilsley
- Wife: Ivy Nelson (1956–1984)
- Sons: Brian Tilsley
- Grandsons: Nick Tilsley
- Granddaughters: Sarah Platt
- Nephews: Craig Tilsley; Ian Latimer
- Nieces: Samantha Tilsley
- Other relatives: Bethany Platt; Billy Platt; Harry Platt; Sam Blakeman

Herbert Harrison "Bert" Tilsley (though referred to as “Albert Tilsley” in the episode of 21 September 1981) was played by Peter Dudley. He was the first husband of Ivy Brennan (Lynne Perrie) and the father of Brian Tilsley (Christopher Quinten). Prior to his debut in 1979, Ivy had referred to her husband as 'Jack' and mentioned that they were childless. During his final months on Coronation Street in 1983, Bert had been left partially disabled after an accident in Brian's garage involving a tyre compressor unit. This was devised because Peter Dudley had suffered a real-life stroke but wanted to continue to appear in the series. Bert's last appearance was in July 1983, and he died (offscreen) in January 1984 of a heart attack while in a psychiatric hospital, following a nervous breakdown. Peter Dudley died in October 1983 (three months before the character's offscreen death) after suffering a further stroke and multiple heart attacks.

Bert's catchphrase, uttered 3 or 4 times an episode was 'You know what I mean?', this disappeared from his vocabulary after his stroke.

Bert was known to be more relaxed about Brian's life decisions, such as his marriage to Gail Potter (Helen Worth), whereas Ivy was more critical.

== Audrey Roberts ==
Audrey Roberts (also Potter), played by Sue Nicholls, is the mother of established character Gail Potter (Helen Worth). Audrey made her first appearance on 16 April 1979 and appeared on a recurring basis for three years until 1982. She returned in 1984 before becoming a full-time regular character the following year.

== Jack Duckworth ==
Jack Duckworth was introduced by executive producer Bill Podmore, and portrayed by Bill Tarmey. The character debuted on-screen during the episode aired on 28 November 1979, initially on a recurring basis. Tarmey made further appearances in 1981 and 1982, before joining full time in 1983. In April 2010, Tarmey announced his decision to leave the soap, and Jack's final appearance was broadcast on 8 November 2010. Jack's storylines have focused on his long-standing marriage to his wife Vera (Liz Dawn), which has often been described as "complex" and "rocky", as well as dealing with wayward son Terry (Nigel Pivaro) and his hobby for pigeon keeping. In his final storyline Jack was portrayed as having incurable non-Hodgkin lymphoma. Jack has been characterised through his "joyless and gloomy" life in which he has a string of dead end jobs but continued to pass witty remarks on life. Critics have described Jack as a loveable rogue type character and have favoured his relationship with Vera.
