= Rebecca Hopkins =

Fictional character from Coronation Street

- Coronation Street character
- Portrayed by: Jill Halfpenny
- Duration: 1999–2000
- First appearance: 3 December 1999
- Last appearance: 27 December 2000
In-universe information
- Occupation: Nurse
- Husband: Jerry Hopkins (until 2000)

Rebecca Hopkins is a fictional character from the British soap opera Coronation Street, played by Jill Halfpenny. Rebecca was introduced as a nurse in an abusive relationship and as the colleague of Martin Platt (Sean Wilson). Rebecca and Martin began a high profile affair. Halfpenny liked the way that the romance was portrayed as she believed that it highlighted that the affair was not planned and that the pair really fell for each other. Martin plans to leave his wife Gail Platt (Helen Worth) for Rebecca, but he stalls when he finds out that their teenage daughter is pregnant. Rebecca and Martin continue their affair, but Rebecca becomes tired of waiting for Martin to leave his wife and she eventually leaves for a new job in Dubai in June 2000. Following Rebecca's departure, Martin admits the affair to Gail and their marriage breaks down. Halfpenny later returned for a short stint which aired in December of that year, which involved a brief reconciliation between Martin and Rebecca. Halfpenny enjoyed working on Coronation Street and did not mind that most of her scenes were with Wilson as they got on well together. Halfpenny believed that viewers had enjoyed Rebecca's storyline. Critics regularly reported on Martin and Rebecca's affair and the progression of the storyline.

== Casting ==
Halfpenny enjoyed playing Rebecca, but joked that she would love to play Jack Duckworth (Bill Tarmey) as he always made her laugh and she liked his glasses. Halfpenny later told Inside Soap that she enjoyed playing "Weatherfield's latest 'other woman'", as she found playing Rebecca to be a "just a job" for her. She explained that as she had been acting for "such a long time", she was able to "switch off", adding, "I am not one of those actors who takes their work home with them. I'm very happy to be have had the storylines I've been given, and also to be acting with Sean Wilson, who's great". Halfpenny believed that she was lucky to get on well with Wilson as most of her scenes were with him. Despite this, she did not feel isolated by working with primarily him as even though she was not with many cast members onscreen, she they were always "around" in the Granada Studios, where the scenes were primarily filmed. Halfpenny added that she was enjoying what she was portraying but she thought that the "only reason" that she would want Rebecca to interact with more characters was to show more sides to Rebecca's character as "everyone reacts differently when they are with different people". After departing Coronation Street, Halfpenny joined the cast of rival soap opera EastEnders in 2002.

== Development ==
=== Affair with Martin ===
Rebecca Hopkins is introduced as a nurse who works in the casualty department of Weatherfield General with established character Martin Platt (Sean Wilson), who is having marital problems. In December 1999, Rebecca herself is having marital problems and Martin offers her a shoulder to cry on. Martin's wife, Gail Platt (Helen Worth) spots the pair in a car and becomes paranoid that they are having an affair. Gail questions him and accuses him of having an affair when his answers are not "up to scratch", which frustrates Martin, who tells Gail that they need to talk. Wilson explained that Martin loves Gail, but she is giving him grief over Rebecca and Martin is not sure how much more he can take.

Martin ends up seeking comfort from Rebecca on Christmas Day 1999 and they have a "one-off indiscretion", which sparks the beginning of an affair for them. Neither Martin nor Rebecca expect that their encounter will quickly turn into a "full-blown affair". Inside Soap reported that their affair "hots up" in January 2000. Wilson was very pleased with the storyline and was happy with the way that scenes had been written, as they wanted to make it clear that Rebecca and Martin are both "very surprised" that they have ended up together, as their affair was not planned at all. Wilson explained that Martin's 10-year age gap between him and Gail and Gail's expectations of her husband have caused Martin to stray. Wilson was not sure if Martin's romance with Rebecca would cause the end of Gail and Martin's marriage, but believed that Gail would be in "big trouble" if Gail finds out. Wilson added that Martin still loves Gail but now "he has seen a glimpse of the other side of life and he's confused. It's a very tangled web at the moment and as long as it stays like that for a while I'll be very happy". Rebecca was the second nurse that Martin had an affair with, as he had previously had an affair with Cathy Power (Theresa Brindley) earlier in the 1990s. Halfpenny was delighted with the way that the storyline was developing and was happy to be working with Wilson, calling him a "great person to work with" and adding that he had helped her feel relaxed and made it easy to work with him since her first day of filming. She explained that there had been "no pressure" and that they had "just eased into the scenes where the relationship gets more intimate". Halfpenny added that she was not worried about being seen as the new "scarlet woman" of Coronation Street as she felt that the story had been written in a way that it was clear that Rebecca has "very sincere feelings" for Martin and is not just having an affair "for the sake of it".

Things go "downhill" in the Platt household when Gail has a pregnancy scare and tries to pressure Martin to get a vasectomy, which leads to Martin deciding that his future is with Rebecca. Martin confides in Danny Hargreaves (Richard Standing) that he loves Rebecca and wants to leave Gail to be with her, but is worried about leaving his children, Sarah (Tina O'Brien) and David (Thomas Ormson/Jack P. Shepherd). Just as Martin is about to make a decision, Rebecca begins questioning the affair when she finds out that Martin is still having sex with Gail, which upsets her and makes her want a break from the relationship. Halfpenny explained that Martin did not mention having sex with Gail before and this makes Rebecca wonder what else he has not told her. Halfpenny added that Rebecca loves Martin but "she wonders if it's worth hurting all those people for something that might not even work out". The following month, Rebecca is on her way to meet Martin and bumps into Gail, who is very upset about her daughter Sarah. Gail wants to speak to someone and Rebecca ends up having a drink with her and being her "confidante", which Rebecca finds very uncomfortable. Halfpenny explained that Rebecca is a rational person and thus does not "blurt" anything out to Gail, but "she does have to bite her tongue a few times". Halfpenny revealed that Rebecca feels guilty, "but at the end of the day Rebecca loves Martin and they're at the point in their relationship where there's no turning back".

=== Relationship issues ===
Rebecca eventually decides to accept a new job offer in Dubai due to Martin's continued stalling over leaving Gail. Despite not making the commitment that Rebecca wants, Martin does not want to lose her, which leads to him taking "drastic action" and does not give in Rebecca's resignation letter to the hospital management. This infuriates Rebecca as she feels that he is abusing his senior position for the benefits of his love life. However, she "softens" when he apologises, so she agrees to stay and tells Martin that she loves him. Martin later begins finding it difficult to juggle his family and Rebecca and to keep everyone happy. When Martin is meant to be playing football, things get "cosy" with Rebecca, who cooks him breakfast and convinces him to take her shopping; however, Martin is forced to make excuses when Gail and David turn up to watch him play. Gail invites Rebecca to a meal with the family, which leads to Rebecca becoming very uncomfortable when Gail reveals how supportive Martin has been with Sarah's teenage pregnancy. Later, the "tension rises" when Gail visits Rebecca's home unexpectedly and sees her half-dressed, with Martin hiding in the bedroom. Wilson explained that Martin knows that he is "sailing close to the wind" but cannot help it as he is in love with Rebecca.

"The whole thing is out of [Rebecca and Martin's] control. They can be as careful as they want. But at the end of the day, you never know who's there, who's watching, who's just around the corner. It's a small world, and you never know who might be next to guess what's going on between the two of them."

— Halfpenny on Rebecca and Martin's secret affair (2000)

Whilst Sarah's teenage pregnancy has caused the Platt household to be in "domestic turmoil", Rebecca and Martin's affair continues to "flourish", though Martin decides to postpone leaving Gail until after the baby is born. Rebecca's husband, Jerry Hopkins (Ken Christiansen) finds out about the affair and threatens to expose them, but Rebecca and Martin continue their affair and set up their own "love nest". However, the drama is "far from over" when Rebecca and Martin get their phones mixed up and Rebecca is horrified to realise that she answered to phone to Gail in a "very provocative manner". Halfpenny explained that the call is a "major reality check" for Rebecca, who is "panic-stricken" and does not what to do as she thinks that she has "blown it". Martin is able to do some "fast talking" and is successful in keeping Gail "blissfully unaware" of their affair. Halfpenny was glad that Gail did not find out the truth as whilst it would have relieved the initial anxiety for Rebecca in having to tell Gail about the situation, the actress believed that it would have been a "real smack in the face" for Gail if she found out by accident, which Halfpenny did not think that Martin and Rebecca would "wish that upon her". Halfpenny explained that the news the revelation would never be "good news" for Gail, who is "totally unaware" of the affair as Martin is a nurse that works shifts and thus she understands if he says that he has to work late. Halfpenny added that Gail and Martin were having marital issues before he started a relationship with Rebecca and so he has not suddenly "started acting strangely". She added that "Gail has so much on her mind at the moment that it's not surprising she can't tell what's going on". Halfpenny was philosophical about Martin and Rebecca's future, explaining that the "whole thing is out of [Rebecca and Martin's] control. They can be as careful as they want. But at the end of the day, you never know who's there, who's watching, who's just around the corner. It's a small world, and you never know who might be next to guess what's going on between the two of them". Halfpenny also believed that Rebecca waiting for Martin is difficult for both of them, telling Inside Soap:

"I think they've both got it very hard. Martin's carrying all this guilt around with him – which must be horrendous – but at the same time, at least he's also busy dealing with his family situation at home. Rebecca is the one sitting in their flat alone, wondering what's going on, and all she has to think about is Martin, which probably sends her a little bit crazy from time to time".

Despite multiple "close calls", Rebecca and Martin are able to keep their affair a secret from Gail. However, Gail's best friend Sally Webster (Sally Dynevor) goes on the "warpath" when she discovers the truth. Sally suspects that Danny is having an affair with someone else when he lies about being on a night out with Martin, so Danny is forced to come clean and admits that he was covering for Martin, who is with Rebecca. Sally is shocked to learn that Martin has been "playing away", and Danny's deceit causes issues for him and Sally, as she is angry that he has betrayed her and Gail. Dynevor explained that Sally feels that she has to do something as she knows how painful it is to be cheated by a husband, so she goes to confront Rebecca as she sees her as a "young, carefree girl who has no idea that she's breaking up a family". Martin gets angry at Sally for confronting Rebecca, and Sally is very angry warns Martin that he does not what she is doing. Dynevor explained that she wants Martin and Gail to be together but she has also seen the effects that a broken marriage can have on children and thus she wants Martin "to think seriously about what a future with Rebecca would mean". Sally also feels burdened by her knowledge and faces a difficult dilemma over whether to tell Gail. Dynevor was happy to be involved in the storyline, adding that "Confrontational scenes are the best" as they have "a bit of substance". Dynevor was also glad that Sally would be involved in other people's dramas.

=== Departure and return ===
Rebecca eventually gets fed up of waiting for Martin to leave Gail and the children and so she decides to take a new job in Dubai in June 2000. Rebecca also believes that Martin's place is with his family, following Sarah giving birth to Bethany. Martin dashes to the airport just as she is about to leave in the hopes of convincing her to stay, but he is unsuccessful as Rebecca does not change her mind and she leaves for a new life in Dubai, leaving a "tormented" Martin behind. This causes Martin to "really" lose his "mind" as he is faced to life with Rebecca, and instead of working on his marriage, he decides to finally tells an unsuspecting Gail about the affair. Gail is shocked by Martin's confession and Martin pours salt in the wound by telling her that Rebecca was his "one true love" and "soulmate". Worth, who portrays Gail, explained that Gail is in "total, total shock" but she can still see that Martin is devastated that Rebecca has left him and is taking out his suffering on Gail as she is the person he is closest to. Worth also believed that Gail's preoccupation with Sarah's pregnancy and working so much may have "blinded her" to what was going on between Rebecca and Martin and meant that she did not realise that things were not "quite right" in her home. However, she added that Gail have at times ignored the signs, such as when Martin was not there when Sarah gave birth, though she added that Gail had "no reason to suspect" as she had known Martin to be reliable and "good".

Inside Soap noted how it was the second time that Martin had cheated on Gail and that Gail cannot ignore the fact that Rebecca was significantly younger than her, which highlights the 10-year age gap between Gail and Martin. Worth explained that Gail is realistic about the age-gap as she had to deal with Martin's fling with Cathy years ago, but she also knows that this is different that Martin's relationship with Rebecca is "serious affair" that can destroy their marriage. A stoic Gail is able to convince Martin to stay, though he makes it clear that he is only staying for the children's sake. Worth explained that Gail is not a victim and does not beg Martin to stay, as she is just trying to make the marriage work. Worth added that Gail "obviously thinks that there is still room to make the marriage work. But the main factor behind her actions is that she loves him".

Despite trying to make it work for the sake of their children, Gail and Martin later divorce, though the pair remain friends. Halfpenny later returned to the soap for a short stint, which aired in December 2000. Martin is shocked to see Rebecca back in Weatherfield, and despite spending Christmas Day with Gail and their children, Martin goes over to see Rebecca later that night as he can longer resist the temptation. However, he leaves when he sees a Christmas party happening where she is staying. However, he is determined to see her and returns the following day, where he and Rebecca rekindle their passion. However, Rebecca is due to leave to return to work afterwards, with Inside Soap questioning how long their rekindled passion would last.

== Storylines ==
Rebecca is a nurse who is being abused by her husband, Jerry Hopkins (Ken Christiansen). She begins confiding in her colleague Martin Platt (Sean Wilson) about her violent husband and the two become friends, which causes Martin's wife Gail Platt (Helen Worth) to become paranoid that they are having an affair and strains their marriage. Martin and Rebecca have a one-night-stand and Martin ignores her afterwards, wanting to save his marriage. Martin feels guilty when he realises that Jerry has hit Rebecca. Martin and Rebecca begin a serious affair and end up falling in love with each other. Jerry finds out about the affair and tells Gail, who does not believe him. Rebecca becomes uncomfortable when she realises that Martin is still having sex with Gail, so she asks for a break from the relationship. Martin tells Rebecca that he plans to leave Gail to be with Rebecca, but he postpones this when he finds out that their 13-year-old daughter Sarah Platt (Tina O'Brien) is pregnant. Rebecca files for divorce from Jerry and continues her affair with Martin, but they are nearly caught several times. Gail's best friend Sally Webster (Sally Dynevor) discovers the affair and confronts Rebecca. Rebecca eventually gets tired of Martin stalling to tell Gail and decides to leave for a new job in Dubai. Martin tries to stop her at the airport but she refuses to change her mind and leaves. This makes Martin so devastated that he tells Gail about the affair, and reveals that Rebecca was the love of his life. Martin and Gail try to save their marriage but this does not work and they eventually divorce. Martin bumps into Rebecca in December 2000 when she is visiting for Christmas. The pair rekindle their passion and have sex. Rebecca invites Martin to join her in Dubai, but he declines as he does not want to abandon his children, so Rebecca returns to Dubai alone.

== Reception ==
In April 2000, Halfpenny revealed that the public "reacted really well" to Rebecca's storyline, and noted that she had not had "any kind of adverse reaction" from viewers when she was in public, which Halfpenny believed suggested that "everyone must be really enjoying the storyline, which is lovely". Writers from TV Choice noted how Rebecca talking to Martin about her marital issues led to Martin and Gail's relationship going from "bad to worse". Regarding Rebecca and Martin's affair, Nikki Bayley from Inside Soap wrote, "what should have been left as just a one-off indiscretion has quickly turned into a full-blown affair". In March 2000, Inside Soap ran a poll asking readers if Martin should stay with Gail or leave to be with Rebecca, with 52% of readers voting that Martin should stay with his family and 48% voting that he should leave Gail. The magazine called Rebecca Martin's "mistress" and added, "it was a tough call but the majority of you [readers] don't want to see another soap family torn apart and think he should stay and work things out". Inside Soap also reported that nearly 17 million viewers watched Martin admit that he wanted to leave Gail for Rebecca in February 2000. This beat rival soap opera EastEnders, which was airing its 15th anniversary episodes in the same week, which gathered 12.9 million viewers. A writer from Inside Soap called the scenes where Gail confides in Rebecca about Sarah an example of "some pretty awkward conversations" that someone can find themselves in if they are in the "midst of a secret affair". They added that it was not surprising that Rebecca found being Gail's confidante uncomfortable. A writer from the same magazine believed that it was not surprising that Rebecca was "livid" by Martin not handing in her resignation letter.

Allison Maund from Inside Soap noted how Gail and Jerry were "oblivious" about Rebecca and Martin's affair. She later noted how Jerry's warning "doesn't appear to be putting the brakes on the romance" due to Rebecca and Martin settling into the "private security" of their own love nest. Maund also called Rebecca and Martin "scheming nurses". Maund believed that it was fortunate for Rebecca that Martin was able to do some fast-talking to Gail when she answered the phone, but added that it could not be "denied" that it was a "very close call" for the lovers. She also called it a "lucky escape" and noted that Rebecca and Martin will have to reveal their "heartbreaking secret" to Gail if they want to be together some day. She also wrote that Rebecca would have to play a "waiting game" whilst Martin tries to be a supportive husband and father. Maund also noted how Rebecca is in torment and called her "Weatherfield's latest 'other woman'". Claire Brand from the same magazine believed that Sally finding out about the affair was Rebecca and Martin's "toughest challenge to date", and she noted that Sally was in an unenviable position due to her "horrific dilemma" of whether to tell Gail about the affair. Brand also believed that Rebecca and Martin's affair was one of the soap's "hottest storylines". Brand's colleague, Rachel Roberts, called Rebecca a "determined nurse" and noted that Rebecca seized the initiative and bought a "one-way ticket out of Martin's life" when she left for Dubai. She added that Martin seemed to be "winning" as he been able to enjoy a "passionate affair" with Rebecca for six forms, but that his "run of good fortune" came to an "abrupt" end when Rebecca left for Dubai.

In 2015, Simon Duke from wrote Chronicle Live wrote that Rebecca "ruffled feathers" in the soap and "turned Martin Platt's head and signalled the end of his marriage to Gail", though she believed that Halfpenny was more famous from her EastEnders role. The following year, Robert Hiley from What to Watch noted how both Rebecca and Kate Mitchell, Halfpenny's character in EastEnders, had affairs with married men in the soaps, with Hiley joking that Halfpenny "definitely earned her money!" Duncan Lindsay from Metro listed Rebecca and Martin's affair as one of Martin's 13 biggest storylines. He attributed the affair as the cause of the breakdown of his marriage to Gail, and he also believed that Gail's paranoia that they were having an affair in 1999 led to the pair to the pair having one. Alison Slade from TV Times believed that Martin's affair with Rebecca was one of Martin's "big moments" and noted how Martin fell for Rebecca. In 2021, Vicki Power from Love TV called Rebecca one of the "troubled souls" that Halfpenny had portrayed. In 2022, Tricia Martin from OK! noted that Halfpenny "hit the big time" when she began playing Rebecca on the soap opera.
