= Hotel Rio Park =

Hotel in Benidorm, Spain

Medplaya Hotel Rio Park

General information
- Location: Benidorm
- Opening: 17 May 1971
- Operator: Med Playa Management

Other information
- Number of rooms: 465

Website
- www.medplaya.com/hotels/hotel-riopark-benidorm.html

The Medplaya Hotel Rio Park is a 4* hotel in Benidorm, Spain that caters to British package holiday tourists from Thomson Holidays, being its most popular hotel, accounting, as of 2001, for 10% of all Thomson guests, and having catered to over a million visits from British tourists, more than any other hotel in the world.

The hotel is several streets away from the beach and is not luxurious, although it does offer a swimming pool and evening entertainment, and boasts high occupancy rates year round, something that has been attributed to the hotel's manager since opening, José Miralpeix.

In the 1970s, there were a number of outbreaks of Legionnaires' disease at the hotel causing several deaths, eventually identified as originating from the hotel's drinking water system. Despite the apparent bad publicity, bookings at the hotel reportedly increased as more potential visitors recognised the name than the cause of its infamy.
