= Blackley Cemetery =

Cemetery in Manchester, England

Coordinates: 53.5305°N 2.2380°W

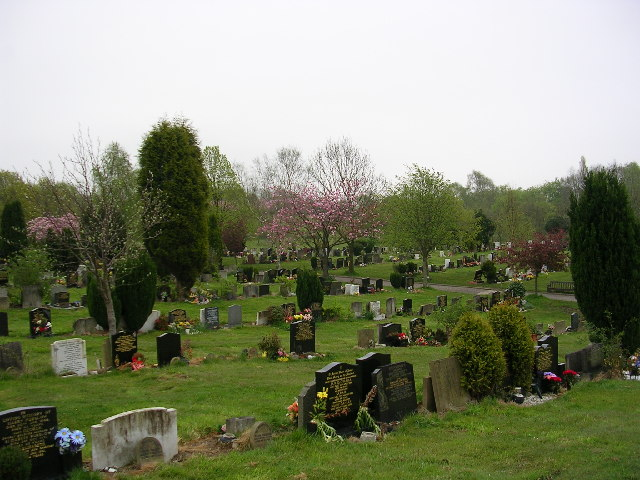
Blackley Cemetery

Blackley Cemetery is a large, municipal cemetery situated within the northern suburbs of the city of Manchester, and is owned, operated and maintained by Manchester City Council. The cemetery and crematorium complex is located on Victoria Avenue in the district of Blackley. It was opened in 1953 on land that was previously a golf course.

The cemetery was, at one time, well known for having problems with drainage, with surface water being problematic during burials and visitation to grave sites. The city has worked to rectify this situation in recent years, with the installation of ground drainage schemes being completed in 2009. The ground drainage scheme has opened up new areas for the opening of new graves, in parts of the cemetery that were originally thought to be unusable.

A currently unused area of the cemetery is to be developed into a Natural Burial area. This project is currently in the planning and problem-solving stage, and it is as yet unknown when the new burial area will be opened for use.

== Crematorium ==
The cemetery contains Blackley Crematorium, the only crematorium facility operated by Manchester City Council (the other crematorium in the city, the Manchester Crematorium at Southern Cemetery, being an independent company), opened in 1959. The crematorium features three chapels – one large, central chapel, with twinned smaller chapels to the eastern and western sides of the building. Until 2022, the crematory area of the crematorium was equipped with three 'Newton'-model cremators, installed by the Furnace Construction Co. Ltd. of Hyde, Cheshire. There are now two FTIII cremators supplied by Facultatieve Technologies of Leeds.

== Notable burials and cremations ==
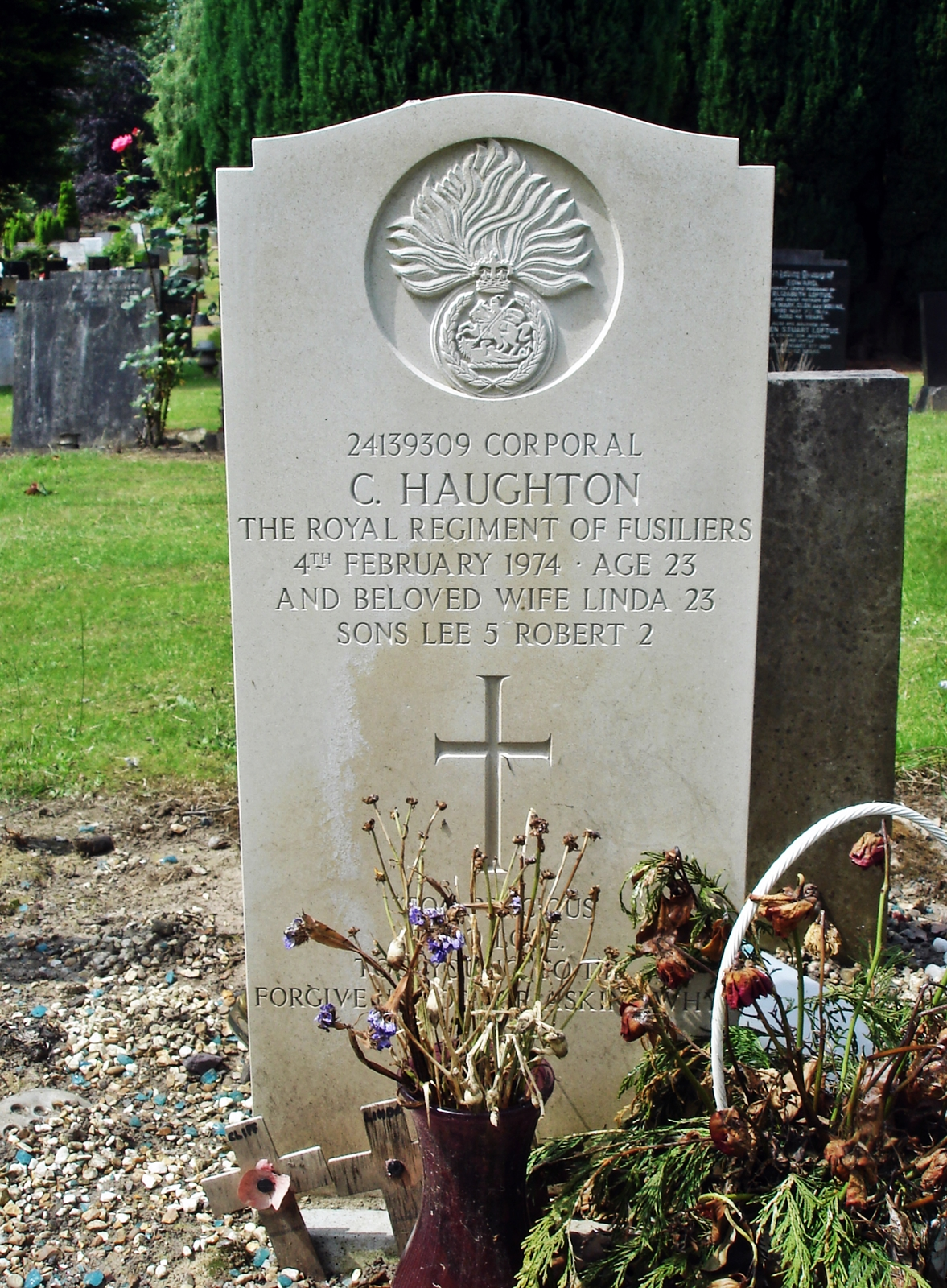
Haughton family grave

Ethel Carnie Holdsworth (1886–1962), working-class writer, feminist, and socialist activist, is buried in the cemetery's Non-Conformist section.

In 1991, the remains of 63 executed prisoners (of which 45 were identifiable) that had been exhumed from unmarked graves in the Strangeways Prison cemetery following rebuilding work at the prison, were cremated at Blackley Crematorium. The cremated remains were re-interred in two graves (plot C2710 and C2711) at the adjacent cemetery. They included the remains of the three Manchester Martyrs – who had been hung at the New Bailey Prison in Salford, Manchester on 23 November 1867 for the killing of a policeman.

Blackley Crematorium was the venue for the funerals of Coronation Street actors Peter Dudley in 1983 and Doris Speed in 1994.

The grave of Corporal Clifford Haughton, Royal Regiment of Fusiliers and his wife and children stands in the cemetery. They were all killed by the IRA in 1974 in the M62 coach bombing, when a time bomb exploded on their coach en route to Catterick.

== See also ==
- Blackley Jewish Cemetery
