= Way Upstream =

- Original language: English
- Written by: Alan Ayckbourn
- Characters: Keith; June; Alistair; Emma; Mrs. Hatfield; Vince; Fleur
- Subject: Power struggles

Premiere
- Date: 2 October 1981
- Place: Stephen Joseph Theatre (Westwood site), Scarborough
- Official website

Way Upstream is a play by Alan Ayckbourn. It was first performed, under Ayckbourn's direction, in Scarborough, North Yorkshire, UK, "in the round" at the Stephen Joseph Theatre, on 2 October 1981. Although realistic in style, with a setting of a hired cabin cruiser on an English river, some journalists read it as an allegory of the political state of England at the time, with the violent resolution of the usurping captain's tyrannical regime taking place at "Armageddon Bridge", and crew members "Alistair" and "Emma" (representing an innocent "Adam" and "Eve") making a new start at the end. Ayckbourn, however, always maintained he was an apolitical writer and is on frequent record for his lack of interest in party politics; his website makes it clear that the play is not about the political state of the nation.

== Original cast ==
- Keith: Robin Bowerman
- June: Carole Boyd
- Alistair: Robin Herford
- Emma: Lavinia Bertram
- Mrs Hatfield: Susan Uebel
- Vince: Graeme Eton
- Fleur: Gillian Bevan

== London opening ==
The London première was at the proscenium Lyttelton Theatre on 4 October 1982, with Ayckbourn again directing. It had been postponed since August; the production became notorious because of its many technical problems during rehearsal, most spectacularly the bursting of the water tank which flooded the National Theatre.

=== Cast ===
- Keith: Tony Haygarth
- June: Susan Fleetwood
- Alistair: Jim Norton
- Emma: Julie Legrand
- Mrs Hatfield: Jane Downs
- Vince: James Laurenson
- Fleur: Nina Thomas

=== Critical reception ===
At the much-delayed première the excitement of the technical problems distorted the appreciation of some critics with Jack Tinker, representative of the Daily Mail, turning up wearing Wellington boots. Most, however, found a work of "genuine merit".

== Other productions ==
It is possible to stage the work without a flooded set and it remains popular with both professional companies and amateur societies. It was revived at the Stephen Joseph Theatre in October 2003. In 1987 the BBC adapted the play as a TV movie, but this has never been released on DVD.

=== BBC Cast ===
- Keith: Barrie Rutter
- June: Marion Bailey
- Alistair: Nick Dunning
- Emma: Joanne Pearce
- Mrs Hatfield: Veronica Clifford
- Vince: Stuart Wilson
- Fleur: Lizzy McInnerny
