= List of Coronation Street characters introduced in 1986 =

Coronation Street (also informally referred to as Corrie) is a long-running British soap opera, noted for its depiction of a down-to-earth working-class community. In September 2010, it became the longest-running television soap opera in the world and is listed in the Guinness World Records. This page lists characters who made their debut appearance in 1986, including Jenny Bradley (now Connor), played by Sally Ann Matthews, who returned to the show from 2015 onwards, 22 years after her last appearance, Jenny's father, Alan Bradley, played by Mark Eden, who was a part of one of the shows most memorable storyline's featuring the Rita Fairclough character, and Sally Seddon (later Webster, now Metcalfe), played by Sally Dynevor, who has been a regular cast member for over 33 years.

== Jenny Bradley ==
Jenny Bradley, played by Sally Ann Matthews. She made her first appearance on screen on 6 January 1986. Originally fostered by Rita Fairclough (Barbara Knox), she has been featured in storylines including her troubled relationship with her father and Rita's partner, Alan (Mark Eden), his death when he is killed in a tram accident after chasing Rita in Blackpool, and a brief underage romance with married man Robert Weston (Philip Bretherton). Their separation in 1991 leads to Jenny leaving on 1 March 1991. She returns for a short stint on 17 September 1993 when she visits Rita for money, but Rita's rejection of her results in Jenny's second departure on 8 October 1993. Jenny returned for four months from 18 February 2015 after meeting Kevin Webster (Michael Le Vell) through internet dating, and they begin a relationship. She is seen to develop an obsession with his son Jack (Jaxon and Maddox Beswick), which culminates in Jenny abducting him before being found in Hull, where she is arrested by police. Her last episode aired on 15 June 2015. On 11 August 2015, the official Coronation Street Twitter page announced that Matthews would be reprising her role as Jenny on 27 January 2016.

== Alan Bradley ==
Alan Bradley played by Mark Eden, first appeared in the episode that aired on 15 January 1986. Jenny's father, he would go on to be one of the most famous villains in the history of the street. The character's last appearance on the 8 December 1989, saw him get killed by a Blackpool tram while chasing Rita Fairclough.

== Sally Webster ==
Sally Metcalfe (also Seddon and Webster), played by actress Sally Dynevor, previously known as Sally Whittaker. The character first appeared on screen during the episode airing on 27 January 1986, when Kevin Webster drove past her in his van. He accidentally splashed her while she was waiting for a bus. She is protective of her two daughters Rosie Webster (Emma Collinge, Helen Flanagan) and Sophie Webster (Ashleigh Middleton, Emma Woodward, Brooke Vincent). Her notable storylines have seen her have an on and off relationship and marriage with Kevin Webster (Michael Le Vell), becoming the victim of domestic abuse by Greg Kelly (Stephen Billington), being diagnosed with breast cancer as well as her attempts to become the pillar of the community and annoy Janice Battersby (Vicky Entwistle) in the process. Over the years, she has tried to impress her bosses Bet Lynch (Julie Goodyear), Alf Roberts (Bryan Mosley), Mike Baldwin (Johnny Briggs), Paul Connor (Sean Gallagher) and Carla Connor (Alison King) and gain promotions. Recently, Sally has embarked on a relationship with Tim Metcalfe (Joe Duttine) and later went on to marry him.

== Jessica Barlow ==
Jessica Barlow
- Coronation Street character
- Portrayed by: Christina Barryk
- First appearance: 31 March 1986
- Last appearance: 14 May 1986
- Introduced by: Bill Podmore
In-universe information
- Father: Eric Midgeley
- Mother: Jean Midgeley
- Husband: Peter Barlow (1990–2000)

Jessica Barlow (also Midgeley) first appeared as the best friend of Susan Barlow, later acting as a bridesmaid at her wedding to Mike Baldwin. However, she soon became the girlfriend of Susan's twin brother; Peter and they both left to live in Portsmouth.

Off-screen she married Peter in 1990 but upon his return to the Street in 2000, he revealed they had divorced due to her infidelity.

== Ian Latimer ==
Ian Latimer
- Coronation Street character
- Portrayed by: Michael Loney
- Duration: 1986–1987
- First appearance: 7 May 1986
- Last appearance: 4 February 1987
- Introduced by: Bill Podmore
In-universe information
- Mother: Ethel Latimer
- Uncles: Bert Tilsley; Trevor Tilsley
- Aunts: Doris Tilsley
- First cousins: Brian Tilsley; Craig Tilsley; Samantha Tilsley
- Other relatives: Nick Tilsley; Sarah Platt

Ian Latimer is the nephew of Bert Tilsley and cousin of Brian Tilsley who lives in Australia. Whilst visiting Brian in Weatherfield, he flirts with Brian's wife Gail Tilsley, who feels uncomfortable at first but later warms towards Ian. Ian later embarks on an affair with Gail, which confesses to Brian shortly after she falls pregnant and believes that Ian may be the father. Ian leaves after a heated argument with Brian but returns before Gail's daughter Sarah is born. Ian leaves again and returns to Australia soon afterwards after a paternity test reveals that he is not Sarah's father and Brian is and Gail asks him to keep quiet about the result.

In 1989, Gail called him to tell him that Brian was stabbed to death, but he couldn't attend the funeral due to flight problems.

== Elsie Seddon ==
Elsie Seddon
- Coronation Street character
- Portrayed by: Brenda Elder
- Duration: 1986, 1989–1991, 1997
- First appearance: 28 May 1986
- Last appearance: 7 July 1997
- Introduced by: Bill Podmore (1986, 1989); Mervyn Watson (1990); Brian Park (1997)
In-universe information
- Other names: Elsie Hopwood
- Brothers: Tom Hopwood
- Sisters: Bertha Croston; May
- Husband: Eddie Seddon (until 1989)
- Daughters: Sally Webster; Gina Seddon
- Granddaughters: Rosie Webster; Sophie Webster

Elsie Seddon (also Hopwood) is the mother of Sally Webster (Sally Dynevor). Elsie first appears demanding money from Sally to fund her father's drinking and gambling habits. Following the death of her husband Eddie in 1989, Elsie comes to stay with Sally and her husband Kevin (Michael Le Vell) after Sally injures her ankle in a road accident. They eventually get fed up with her when she begins hinting at babies and she leaves after Sally has recovered. Elsie then moves to Scarborough and opens a boarding house. In March 1997, Elsie suffers a stroke and Sally goes to Scarborough to nurse her back to health. In July, Elsie is seen again when Kevin goes to Scarborough in an attempt to patch up his and Sally's marriage after he has an affair with Natalie Horrocks (Denise Welch). During this time, Elsie's granddaughter Rosie (Emma Collinge), goes missing but is eventually found safe and well. Elsie is last seen when Kevin's father, Bill Webster (Peter Armitage), visits Sally at her home in an unsuccessful attempt to convince her to forgive Kevin. Elsie dies off-screen in May 1998 after suffering another stroke. She leaves Sally an inheritance of £50,000 in her will.

== Eddie Seddon ==
Eddie Seddon
- Coronation Street character
- Portrayed by: James Duggan
- Appears on: 1 October 1986
- Introduced by: Bill Podmore
In-universe information
- Sisters: Velda Seddon
- Wife: Elsie Hopwood (until 1989)
- Daughters: Sally Webster; Gina Seddon
- Granddaughters: Rosie Webster; Sophie Webster
- Nephews: Paul Seddon

Eddie Seddon was the abusive father of Sally Webster (Sally Dynevor). He makes his only appearance on 1 October 1986, when he opposes Sally's engagement to Kevin Webster (Michael Le Vell) and tells Sally that he will not be attending their wedding, which would take place the following week. Almost three years later, Eddie dies in a lorry accident and leaves £1,000 from his life insurance to Sally and her sister Gina (Julie Foy/Connie Hyde).

== Neville Hawthorne ==
Neville Hawthorne
- Coronation Street character
- Portrayed by: Mark Chatterton
- Duration: 1986, 2005, 2007
- First appearance: 20 October 1986
- Last appearance: 8 August 2007
- Introduced by: Bill Podmore (1986); Tony Wood (2005); Steve Frost (2007)
In-universe information
- Mother: Angela Hawthorne
- Stepfather: Derek Wilton (1985–1988); Norris Cole (1995–1999); Ivor Priestly (2000–2003); George Trench (2004 –2006)
- Grandfathers: J.W. Hawthorne
- Uncles: Donald Hawthorne

Neville Hawthorne is the son of Angela Hawthorne. He first appeared in October 1986 when his then-stepfather, Derek Wilton, was seeing Mavis Riley. Neville made his most recent appearance at Angela's funeral in 2007.
