= List of Coronation Street characters introduced in 1988 =

Coronation Street is a British soap opera, initially produced by Granada Television. Created by writer Tony Warren, Coronation Street first broadcast on ITV on 9 December 1960. The following is a list of characters introduced in the show's twenty-ninth year, by order of first appearance.

== Harry Ashton ==
Harry Ashton
- Coronation Street character
- Portrayed by: Keith Marsh
- First appearance: Episode 2799; 25 January 1988
- Last appearance: Episode 2826; 27 April 1988
- Introduced by: John G. Temple
In-universe information
- Sisters: Muriel Ashton

Harry Ashton was an OAP who enquired about a vacancy for a paperboy at The Kabin in January 1988. Rita and Mavis tried to politely refuse but he had an answers for all of their concerns - he got up early every day to walk his loyal dog Jimmy, and he was obsessed with keeping fit. To prove he could manage the early hours, he volunteered for a trial run. Alan Bradley gave Harry the toughest round to test him, and he returned with the same enthusiasm despite a gang of kids pinching his flashlight (he'd got it back when Jimmy frightened them away). Rita and Mavis were impressed and he was taken on.

While Harry insisted on being treated no differently from the other paperboys, Mavis gave him Priscilla Millbanks's round as it was the easiest. This didn't go down well with Priscilla and Wayne Pickles, who threatened to quit unless Harry was sacked as the job should go to a kid. Harry offered to resign, but Mavis instead called all parties to a meeting at Jim's Cafe where she got Wayne and Priscilla to agree to stay in exchange for reinstating their old rounds, and sharing Craig Atkinson's round between them while he was sick with a cold, but she made clear her feelings on their selfish, petty-mindedness.

As Mavis had saved his job, Harry asked her out to dinner at a place in the Precinct. Mavis tried to refuse but he wheedled a yes out of her. The evening was made awkward by the fact that Mavis thought Harry was spending what little money he had on her and tried to cut costs by suggesting they split the bill (which he refused) and then ordering an omelette and water (which Harry asked was for religious reasons). Harry told Mavis that he'd taken early retirement from his position as Senior at the Rates Office as his wife was ill but she died six months later, and so a job delivering newspapers coupled with his pension suited him very well.

A few days later, Mavis received a surprise visit from Harry's sister Muriel. Muriel was a spinster who, having lived with Harry since his wife's death, and been close to Harry since their parents' early deaths, was threatened by Mavis, and had come to the Kabin to inspect her. Muriel settled Mavis's worries about Harry's finances, telling her that Harry dabbled in stocks and shares but didn't give the impression of being wealthy as he didn't throw his money around. Muriel's motivation in visiting Mavis was obvious, however, and Mavis was very embarrassed. Harry asked Mavis to take what Muriel said with a pinch of salt, but Mavis told him she wanted to keep things formal from now on.

In April 1988, Harry and Mavis saw Cry Freedom at the pictures.

Harry lived in Nelson Street. He told Rita that he knew of Len Fairclough as he did job as his neighbour's house a few years ago.

== Priscilla Millbanks ==
Priscilla Millbanks
- Coronation Street character
- Portrayed by: Nicola Stephenson
- First appearance: Episode 2801; 1 February 1988
- Last appearance: Episode 2835; 1 June 1988
- Introduced by: Bill Podmore
In-universe information
- Sisters: Cheryl Millbanks

Priscilla Millbanks was a young girl who delivered newspapers for The Kabin in 1988. Along with Wayne Pickles, Priscilla gave Rita Fairclough and Mavis Riley an ultimatum that newly appointed paper-pensioner Harry Ashton be sacked or they'd quit. Priscilla and Wayne thought the allowances made for Harry's age were unfair on them as Priscilla had been given a more difficult round so that Harry could have hers. Mavis called all parties to a meeting at Jim's Cafe where she got them to agree to stay in exchange for reinstating their old rounds and sharing Craig Atkinson's round between them while he was sick with a cold, but she made her feelings clear on their selfish, petty-mindedness.

Later that year, when Wayne beat up Jason Stubbs for stealing his round (when in fact Wayne had been sacked for not showing up for work five times in one month), Priscilla warned Mavis that Wayne was planning to go on giving Jason a hard time.

Priscilla had a sister, Cheryl, who was expecting a baby in 1988.

== Gina Seddon ==
Gina Seddon
- Coronation Street character
- Portrayed by: Julie Foy (1988–1989); Connie Hyde (2017–2019)
- Duration: 1988–1989, 2017–2019
- First appearance: Episode 2813; 14 March 1988
- Last appearance: Episode 9733; 1 April 2019
- Introduced by: Bill Podmore (1988); Kate Oates (2017)
In-universe information
- Occupation: Machinist
- Father: Eddie Seddon
- Mother: Elsie Seddon
- Sisters: Sally Webster
- Husband: Colin (off-screen); Donnie Buckley (off-screen)
- Children: Judy
- Stepdaughters: Leah Buckley
- Uncles: Tom Hopwood
- Aunts: Velda Seddon; Bertha Croston; May Hopwood
- Nieces: Rosie Webster; Sophie Webster
- First cousins: Paul Seddon
- Other relatives: Nicolette Seddon

Gina Seddon made her first appearance on 14 March 1988. She was originally played by Julie Foy. On 15 March 2017, it was announced that the character would be reintroduced, with Connie Hyde taking over the role. Gina returned on 28 April 2017.

Gina is the younger sister of Sally Webster (Sally Dynevor). She comes to Weatherfield to lodge with Sally and her new husband, Kevin (Michael Le Vell). Gina has a one-night stand with Martin Platt (Sean Wilson) while dating Billy Wyatt (Fabian Cartwright), leading to a fight between Martin and Billy. When Gina and Sally's father Eddie (James Duggan) dies, Gina inherits £1,000 from his life insurance and leaves Weatherfield. When Sally is diagnosed with breast cancer in 2009, she goes to stay with Gina for six months while she recovers from surgery.

In 2017, Sally is targeted by an internet troll and resigns from the council. Sally's daughters, Rosie (Helen Flanagan) and Sophie Webster (Brooke Vincent), track down Leah Buckley (Molly McGlynn), believing she is the troll. Leah denies being the troll, but her stepmother is to blame and will get her to stop. After Sophie tells Rosie about Sally's state, Rosie goes to see Leah and is surprised to spot Gina, who turns out to be Leah's stepmother. Rosie confronts Leah and demands to know if Gina is the troll. Leah explains that Gina has ill and has become bitter towards Sally, as she was there for her when she was ill, but Sally hasn't done the same for Gina. Rosie threatens to report Gina to the police, but Leah counter-threatens to go to the papers about Sally neglecting Gina when she was ill. Rosie tells Sophie who the troll is and they both go to see Gina and Leah, where they learn Gina has bipolar disorder. When Gina goes missing, Rosie and Sophie help Leah find her and Gina turns up on the street. Gina wants to talk to Sally, but Leah bundles her into the car and drives off. Sally and her husband, Tim Metcalfe (Joe Duttine) visit Gina and Leah and invite them to stay with them and Sally helps find a home for Gina and Leah. Sally is upset when Gina confesses that she was responsible for trolling her. Leah makes plans to go to France with a friend and Tim overhears Leah on the phone, saying how Sally can look after Gina and Tim works out Leah was the troll and Gina goes missing. Gina is later found and Leah is kicked out and leaves for France. Gina and Sally reunite their sisterhood and Gina begins to live with Sally. Gina starts a romantic relationship with Dev and moves in with him and starts working part time at his shop. She also gets employed to work as a machinist at Underworld with her sister Sally. Dev and Gina later end their relationship after a few months of dating due to Dev thinking the worst of Gina and her medicine not begin taken right. She moves back in with Sally but Sally is later framed for crimes she didn't commit and sentenced to 4 years in prison. While Tim and Gina try finding evidence that Sally is innocent, Gina finds that she has strong feelings for Tim and later sleeps with him while he's drunk. Tim then gets angry and kicks her out. Gina then starts a friendship with Kevin Webster who later agrees that Gina can move in at his. After Sally finds out that Gina tried to destroy her marriage, she doesn't take it well and tells Gina she means nothing to her. When evidence of Sally's innocence is discovered she is released from prison, Gina then tries to make bonds with her sister again but Sally refuses. Gina then wants to leave Weatherfield after being blamed for taking Sophie's money which Kevin actually took for a holiday. He later begs her to stay which she decides to do. When Underworld is closed down by manager Carla Connor, Gina and her fellow colleagues protest to get their jobs back. While Gina and Sally are up on the roof putting up posters they later begin to argue. Gina later offers her hand to Sally after she falls back but the Underworld roof has actually collapsed leaving Sally falling in the debris with Gina just missing getting trapped under. She and some neighbours from the street later try saving the people inside. When Gina and the paramedics save Sally, she is taken to hospital but Tim refuses that Gina goes with them in the ambulance and later starts helping out the casualties as they came out the rubble of the destroyed factory. A few days after the tragic event Gina tells Sally that Rana Habeeb was killed in the factory collapse leaving Sally shocked and fearful of her injuries. Gina later begins to feel guilty and starts to question if she and Sally were responsible for the roof caving in. She is later told that the roof could hold around 20 people and that she and Sally weren't to blame for the roof as it was in fact sabotage. Gina then tells Kevin that she wants to leave for good because she doesn't think that her and Sally can sort things out even after a life or death situation. She later tells Tim that she is leaving but notices something odd about him and stops the cab she is alter in the check on him. She later finds Tim in a state and calls for an ambulance. Tim is later hospitalised and told that he had a mini heart attack. Sally later thanks Gina and after Tim is discharged from hospital he thanks her too. Before Gina leaves she works things out with Sally and Tim and later leaves the street. According to Kevin, Gina has gone to Liverpool for a fresh start.

== Arthur Watts ==
Arthur Watts
- Coronation Street character
- Portrayed by: Kenneth Waller (1988); John Pickles (1995); Geoff Oldman (2002)
- Duration: 1988, 1995, 2002
- First appearance: Episode 2818; 30 March 1988
- Last appearance: Episode 5228; 10 March 2002
- Introduced by: John G. Temple
In-universe information
- Wife: Eunice Watts
- Sons: Curly Watts
- Grandsons: Ben Watts
- Granddaughters: Alice Watts

Arthur Watts was the strict and old-fashioned father of Curly Watts (Kevin Kennedy), who was considerably hen-pecked by his wife Eunice Watts. He appeared in six episodes of Coronation Street and was played by three different actors over three stints in the programme. Kenneth Waller originally played Arthur, however his first name wasn't given until John Pickles took over the role in 1995. Beforehand, his name was revealed to be Harry in conversation, but credited as Mr Watts. Geoff Oldman took over the role when the character last appeared in 2002.

Arthur was first seen in March 1988 when Curly went home to collect his double-bed from their house in Crewe, as he was set to move into the corner shop flat with his girlfriend Shirley Armitage. Eunice, his wife, didn't approve of this as she was against him living under the brush and refused to let him take the bed. Arthur and Eunice proved to be racist when they met Shirley as she was black and they disapproved. Eunice was very upset by the incident and refused to talk to Curly, but Arthur visited him in June. He tried to build bridges between Curly and Eunice, but this didn't work.

Arthur and Eunice didn't have a lot to do with Curly's life in Weatherfield and weren't seen again until Christmas Day 1995, when Curly and his first wife, Raquel Watts (Sarah Lancashire), invited their parents over for dinner. It was their first time meeting Raquel as their wedding was rushed. Raquel's parents, the Wolstenhulmes, were far more down-to-earth than the Wattses.

In March 2002, Arthur and Eunice attended the christening of their grandson, Ben Watts.

== Eunice Watts ==
Eunice Watts
- Coronation Street character
- Portrayed by: Angela Rooks (1988, 2002); Georgine Anderson (1995)
- Duration: 1988, 1995, 2002
- First appearance: Episode 2818; 30 March 1988
- Last appearance: Episode 5228; 10 March 2002
- Introduced by: John G. Temple
In-universe information
- Husband: Arthur Watts
- Sons: Curly Watts
- Grandsons: Ben Watts
- Granddaughters: Alice Watts

Eunice Watts was the strict and old-fashioned mother of Curly Watts (Kevin Kennedy), who considerably hen-pecked her husband, Arthur Watts. She appeared in four episodes of Coronation Street and was played by two actresses. She was originally played by Angela Rooks when she first appeared in 1988 and then again for the characters third stint in 2002. During her first stint, she was credited as Mrs Watts. When Eunice was reintroduced for her second stint, she was played by Georgine Anderson.

Eunice was first seen in March 1988 when Curly went home to collect his double-bed from their house in Crewe, as he was set to move into the corner shop flat with his girlfriend Shirley Armitage. Eunice, his wife, didn't approve of this as she was against him living under the brush and refused to let him take the bed. Arthur and Eunice proved to be racist when they met Shirley as she was black and they disapproved. Eunice was very upset by the incident and refused to talk to Curly. Her husband did try to build bridges between her and Curly, but it was no use.

Arthur and Eunice didn't have a lot to do with Curly's life in Weatherfield and weren't seen again until Christmas Day 1995, when Curly and his first wife, Raquel Watts (Sarah Lancashire), invited their parents over for dinner. It was their first time meeting Raquel as their wedding was rushed. Raquel's parents, the Wolstenhulmes, were far more down-to-earth than the Wattses.

In March 2002, Arthur and Eunice attended the christening of their grandson, Ben Watts.

== Sandra Stubbs ==
Sandra Stubbs
- Coronation Street character
- Portrayed by: Sally Watts
- Duration: 1988–1989
- First appearance: Episode 2827; 2 May 1988
- Last appearance: Episode 2912; 22 February 1989
- Introduced by: Bill Podmore
In-universe information
- Husband: Ronnie Stubbs
- Sons: Jason Stubbs

Sandra Stubbs was cleaner and barmaid at the Rovers Return Inn from 1988 to 1989. Mother of thirteen-year-old Jason Stubbs, Sandra was fleeing from her abusive husband Ronnie when she started at the Rovers. When Social Services discovered she was leaving Jason on his own while she worked, Sandra had to quit the Rovers and move in with her mother.

== Jason Stubbs ==
Jason Stubbs
- Coronation Street character
- Portrayed by: Paul Simpson
- Duration: 1988–1989
- First appearance: Episode 2829; 9 May 1988
- Last appearance: Episode 2910; 15 February 1989
In-universe information
- Father: Ronnie Stubbs
- Mother: Sandra Stubbs

Jason Stubbs was the teenage son of Rovers Return cleaner Sandra Stubbs and her abusive husband Ronnie.

In 1988, Sandra and Jason fled to Weatherfield to escape from Sandra's abusive husband Ronnie. Jason missed his dad but was loyal to Sandra, having tried to defend Sandra from his violence on at least one occasion. In November 1986, when it was feared that Ronnie was a danger to Jason, a social worker visited the Stubbs but found no cause to remove Jason from his parents.

Sandra and Jason soon settled into their new lives; Sandra rented Flat 3, 44 Rosamund Street, got a job as the Rovers and settled Jason into a new school. Having had a paper round before moving, Jason asked at the Kabin if they needed anyone. They didn't, but the polite lad made an impression on Mavis Riley, who two days later decided to sack unreliable Wayne Pickles and give Jason his round. On his first day in the job, Jason was beaten up by Wayne for "stealing" the round, Wayne having guarded the round to see who had taken it over. Jason was intimidated enough to cover for Wayne, telling Rita and Mavis that he'd tripped over his bag strap, but the next time Wayne cornered him he fought back and knocked his bike over. The matter was resolved when Sandra got the truth from Jason and threatened Wayne's mum in the Kabin.

A few weeks later, Ronnie re-appeared on the scene, having tracked Sandra and Jason down. Adamant that there was no way back for her and Ronnie, Sandra refused to acknowledge him, and so he turned to Jason, turning up at his school at lunchtime as a surprise. Although glad to see his dad, Jason refused to divulge their new home address, and Sandra arrived on the scene before Ronnie could interrogate him further. Ronnie remained in the area until he was due to return to the ships, working on Sandra and her friends to persuade her to give their marriage another try. The night before he was due to leave, a drunken Ronnie followed Sandra home, where he pleaded with her one last time. Met with unwavering defiance, Ronnie became violent, breaking a promise he'd made seconds before. Jason raced to the Rovers to get help; however by the time Ken Barlow, Kevin Webster and Alan Bradley arrived at the flat, Ronnie had fled the scene, leaving Sandra bruised and beaten. Upset to see his mother so vulnerable, Jason was taken in by Bet Gilroy at the Rovers for the night while Sandra was kept in hospital.

In November, Jason admitted to Mavis that the paperboys were joking about Derek Wilton not showing up at their wedding. The lads were well aware of Mavis and Derek's disastrous first wedding, in which they'd jilted each other. Also that month, Jason told Rita that he wasn't looking forward to an upcoming parent/teacher evening at school, as he hadn't been doing the work.

In 1989, Jason fell in with the wrong crowd and on one afternoon in February, while Sandra was at work, Ken Barlow caught Jason and his mates having a booze-up in the flat, drinking lager from cans purchased at the Corner Shop. The boys ran off at the sight of Ken, who had called at the flat to offer Jason a paper round with the Weatherfield Recorder. After helping Jason tidy the living room, Ken advised the boy to choose his friends better. The incident would remain a problem for Sandra and Jason to sort themselves, but for Jason's friends being caught by the police vandalising a car, and giving them Jason's address. Discovering both that Jason had been drinking and that he was routinely left on his own, WPC Morgan contacted Social Services, and a social worker, Mrs Lambert, was assigned the case. Sandra was informed that it was illegal for her to leave Jason on his own while she worked, and that something would have to change. With immediate effect, Sandra quit her job and moved out of the flat and in with her mother temporarily, uprooting the family once again.

== Malcolm Reid ==
Malcolm Reid
- Coronation Street character
- Portrayed by: Shane Rimmer
- First appearance: Episode 2851; 27 July 1988
- Last appearance: Episode 2856; 15 August 1988
- Introduced by: John G. Temple
In-universe information
- Wife: Joyce Reid (backstory)
- Adoptive sons: Stephen Reid

Malcolm Reid and his wife, Joyce, were neighbours of Audrey Roberts (Sue Nicholls) in the 1950s. In 1957, sixteen-year-old Audrey gave birth to a baby boy, Stephen (Todd Boyce), whom she was forced to give up for adoption by her father, Robert Potter. The Potters and the Reids were close, and Audrey's parents knew that they wanted a baby, so they subsequently adopted Stephen. Audrey then gave birth to Gail Tilsley (Helen Worth) in 1958, when she was seventeen, and two years later, Malcolm and Joyce emigrated to Toronto. Audrey never spoke about it until 1988, when Malcolm wrote to her and later came to Weatherfield. It came as a surprise to Gail and to Audrey's husband, Alf Roberts (Bryan Mosley), that she also had a son. Malcolm offered Audrey a life in Canada, but she didn't go with him, choosing to stay with Alf, a decision she regretted three years later when she and Alf split; she was disappointed to find out Malcolm was getting married shortly after.

== Paul Rigby ==
Paul Rigby
- Coronation Street character
- Portrayed by: Keith Marsh
- Duration: 1988–1990
- First appearance: Episode 2890; 12 December 1988
- Last appearance: Episode 3082; 15 June 1990
- Introduced by: John G. Temple
In-universe information
- Occupation: Publican
- Wife: Stella Rigby

Paul Rigby was the unfaithful husband of landlady Stella Rigby, who was very lustful and spent a lot of time chasing younger women. He appeared intermittently between December 1988 and June 1990. Stella tolerated this as it kept him entertained in her mind. Due to Stella being friends with Bet Gilroy (Julie Goodyear), he spent a lot of time at The Rovers Return. He considered Bet's husband Alec Gilroy (Roy Barraclough) a friend, but Alec didn't see Paul in the same light. Alec disapproved of Paul's behaviour and thought he behaved like he didn't have a wife.
