= Alan Bradley (Coronation Street) =

Fictional character from Coronation Street

- Coronation Street character
- Portrayed by: Mark Eden
- Duration: 1986–1989
- First appearance: Episode 2587; 15 January 1986
- Last appearance: Episode 3002; 8 December 1989
- Introduced by: John G. Temple
In-universe information
- Occupation: Businessman
- Wife: Pat Bradley (backstory)
- Daughters: Jenny Bradley
- Grandsons: Tom Midgeley

Alan Bradley is a fictional character from the British ITV soap opera Coronation Street, played by Mark Eden. He first appeared on 15 January 1986 and became the show's main antagonist until the character was killed off on 8 December 1989. The character has been compared to later soap opera villains on the show; including Richard Hillman (Brian Capron) and Pat Phelan (Connor McIntyre).

== Storylines ==
=== Backstory ===
Alan Bradley is born on the 20th of July 1939.

At some point, he marries a woman named Pat, and in 1971 she conceives a daughter whom they name Jenny (Sally Ann Matthews). During this time, Alan enjoys the free life of a bachelor and spends little time at home. This is partly because his job installing air conditioning systems takes him all over the country. In 1978, Alan and Pat divorce. By the end of 1985, Alan is living in Scarcroft, near Leeds.

=== 1986 ===
In January 1986, Alan is tracked down by social services and informed that his ex-wife Pat was killed in a road accident. He learns that Jenny, now fourteen, is living in Weatherfield with her foster mother, the local shopkeeper, Rita Fairclough (Barbara Knox). The news prompts Alan to collect his daughter, but Jenny resents him for abandoning her. With Rita's help, Alan convinces Jenny to give him a chance. He transfers to Weatherfield so Jenny can live with him without changing schools.

Alan develops an attraction towards Rita and regularly visits her at her shop. While Rita also develops feelings for him, his masculine and aggressive streak often reminded her of her late husband, Len (Peter Adamson). Alan begins to have doubts about their relationship and starts cheating on her with her friend, Gloria Todd (Sue Jenkins). This escalated when Alan discovers troublemaker, Terry Duckworth (Nigel Pivaro), pestering Gloria at her workplace– a local public house called The Rovers Return Inn. He confronts Terry and warns him to stay away from Gloria, but learns that Terry has been causing trouble for Jenny as well. When Alan confronts him again to warn him off Jenny, Terry calls him a 'demolition man'. In response, Alan lashes out at Terry and brutally attacks him before getting kicked out by the pub's landlady, Bet Lynch (Julie Goodyear), shortly afterwards. Later on, Alan apologizes to Gloria for losing his temper and explains that he previously had a two-year suspended sentence for assault, further claiming that its relation to his past still weighs on him.

Alan begins dating both Gloria and Rita without either's knowledge, eventually having sex with Gloria. The women eventually realize he is dating both of them. Rita tells Alan that she is aware of his behaviour and he admits to sleeping with Gloria. Rita forces him to choose which of the two he wishes to be with. He ends up choosing Rita, as Gloria already ended her relationship with Alan after confronting him about the affair. Alan and Rita manage to slowly rebuild their romance and put their rocky start behind them.

In September 1986, Alan is made redundant and his pride keeps him from telling Rita; however, she discovers this from fellow resident, Mavis Riley (Thelma Barlow). A new job soon came up for Alan in Liverpool, and Rita convinces him to take it even though it means three months in Dubai; Alan agrees to take the job and arranges for Jenny to move in with Rita.

=== 1987 ===
In January 1987, a year after he first arrived in Weatherfield, Alan returns to the news that Jenny had been in a car crash in Rita's car. When he visits his daughter, Alan learns that she had been dating her schoolmate, Martin Platt (Sean Wilson), and suspects that he had caused the crash knowing that Martin often sped in his car. Alan later confronts Martin and is ready to hit him, but Jenny admits that she had been driving. Alan convinces Martin and Jenny later confess to the police, but Rita refuses to press charges so nothing comes of it. Alan thanks Rita and tells her he will compensate her from the money he was earning in Dubai. He then continues to woo Rita and proposes to her. Alan is shocked when she says no, with Rita stating that she prefer for them to carry on as partners.

Following his return from Dubai, Alan moves into Rita's house and begins to spend more quality time with Jenny, which helps take his mind off of Rita's rejection. Alan soon takes an interest in Rita's shop, The Kabin, opening a video library and installing an electric till within the shop to modernize it. His changes worry Mavis, as she suspect that Alan is worming his way into The Kabin and might plan to have her replaced. Mavis confides to her husband, Derek Wilton (Peter Baldwin), about her suspicions and he questions Alan about this on Mavis' behalf. In response, Alan threatens Mavis and Derek to stay away from him; Rita soon learns what Alan was doing and tells him to not make any more changes at her shop.

Alan soon feels emasculated by being second to Rita financially and decides to buy Tilsley's Garage when its owner, Brian Tilsley (Christopher Quinten), makes plans to move down south with his wife, Gail (Helen Worth). At the last minute, however, the couple pull out of the sale. Alan, unhappy that his chances of buying the garage were ruined, still has his heart set on marrying Rita and, thinking she needs more convincing, books a surprise wedding for them at the Weatherfield Register Office. He plans to lure Rita there under the pretext that they had been invited to a friend's wedding. When they get there, Rita couldn't believe Alan had actually planned a surprise wedding. Rita promptly gets back into the taxi that she had come in; Alan is left feeling humiliated as he comes to the realization that Rita will never marry him.

By the time Jenny turns sixteen, she decides to leave school despite Alan wanting her to stay and complete her A-Levels. Alan and Rita later find out that Jenny has gone to France to escape them from telling her what to do. Alan furiously goes to France to find her, but he comes back empty-handed. She returns to the Weatherfield in October 1987 with the news that she was engaged to a French student, Patrice Podevin (Franck Dubosc). Alan thinks Jenny is too young and immature to get married and refuses to give his blessing. Rita opposes Alan's views and gives Jenny her own blessing. Alan is proven right when Jenny cheats on Patrice with Gary Grimshaw (Colin Kerrigan); Patrice breaks off the engagement to Jenny and Alan later comforts her when her ex-fiancé returns to France alone. While he manages to reconcile with Jenny in light of her broken engagement, Alan becomes bored with merely running the video library and seeks to expand his business interests.

=== 1988–1989 ===
In 1988, he finds a job fitting burglar alarms. Alan soon wants to go into partnership with his manager Dave Craig (Alan Hulse) and asks Rita to loan him £6,000 to buy into the business. When Dave isn't interested, Alan decides to set up his own business called Bradley Securities Limited and sets about creating it by using Rita's money to buy a company car. Despite her reservations, Rita gives Alan a loan and helps him set-up his business in Len's old Builder's Yard.

In the summer, Alan starts to ignore Rita and becomes romantically interested in his client Carole Burns (Irene Skillington). This continues to the point that Alan leaves Rita, telling her that he was tired of the way she "coldly" put him down. In response, Rita demands he return the money that she had loaned to him; he reluctantly complies and Alan is later forced to vacate the yard. Alan moves out of Rita's house and his business collapses as both the bank and Carole refused to give him a loan. In November 1988, he leaves Carole and again returns to Rita and Jenny. They are initially sceptical until Alan explained that he didn't come back because of the money, but had plans to set up a shop without needing a penny from her. Without Rita's knowledge, he steals the deeds to her house and re-mortgages it for £15,000 by posing as Len, whose name is still on the deeds. With the cheque in hand, Alan tells Rita the bank had given him a loan; Rita believes him and Alan later transfers his business to a shop unit in Curzon Street, renaming it Weatherfield Security Systems to cover his tracks with the building society.

From then onwards, Alan does everything to keep the truth from Rita, whilst also trying to retain his "family-man" relationships with both her and Jenny in the process. He has all letters from the bank re-directed to the shop and handles all mail and phone calls himself. The business grows more successful when Alan employs Martin to be his assistant, partly at Jenny's urging, and later hires the newly arrived Dawn Prescott (Louise Harrison) to become his receptionist. Alan quickly fancies Dawn and asks her out, telling her Rita was just his landlady, but she isn't interested. This only encourages him and he confides to Dawn his feelings to her in March 1989. When she rejects his romantic appeals, Alan attempts to rape her, but she manages to escape by rushing out onto the street.

The following day Dawn tells Rita about the incident and exposes his scheme by telling Rita about the letters and phone calls addressed to her and asking for Leonard Fairclough. This prompts Rita to investigate Alan's activities, and she is shocked to learn what Alan has done. On the night Jenny celebrates her eighteenth birthday, Rita confronts Alan and he admits to committing fraud. Alan is unfazed by the way Rita reacts when she discovers his lies, but his mood changes when he learns that she has stopped him from going any further. Earlier, Rita had visited the building society and exposed his deceit by confirming Len's fate. Alan grows enraged when Rita ends their relationship. In response, he lashes out at Rita as she answers a phone call from Jenny. After forcefully stopping Rita from answering the call, Alan hits Rita and then tries to suffocate her with a cushion. Rita is saved by Jenny and Martin returning from a party. Alan promptly flees from the house and drive out of Weatherfield, leaving Jenny and Martin to look after Rita before she is taken to hospital.

The next day, Alan finds himself wanted by the police after Rita tells them about what he has done. Jenny learns about her father's activities. He phones Jenny and asks her to meet him at a train station with his passport and money, which she reluctantly does. The police follow her without her knowledge, and Alan is arrested when Martin and the police catch up with him. As he is taken into custody, Alan believes Jenny sold him to the police and disowns her. Alan is charged with deception and actual bodily harm and spends six months on remand. When Jenny later visits her father in prison, he asks her to beg Rita to downplay what had happened; however, Jenny refuses when she realizes that her father is only thinking about himself and ignores his wishes.

In October 1989, Alan's trial starts. He pleads guilty to deception and actual bodily harm in a bid to avoid going to prison. This works successfully as Alan is given two years in prison, but walks free as he had already served enough time on remand without bail. Rita is horrified by the verdict and becomes convinced Alan is going to take revenge on her. Her fears are quickly proven correct when Alan torments Rita for destroying his business and ending their relationship. He first visits Rita while she is alone at her house, claiming that he is there to see Jenny. Tensions grow when she asks him to leave. He refuses and continues to intimidate Rita, leaving her desperately afraid.

Alan later moves into a bedsit nearby and lands himself a job at the building site near Rita's house, wanting to stay close to her. When Jenny confronts her father about what he is doing, he tells his daughter that he is staying in Weatherfield and claims to still love her—as well as Rita. Jenny reluctantly accepts this and Alan's false claims end up sparking trouble between his daughter and Rita, as Jenny wrongly claims that Rita is being vindictive and turns against her.

When Rita learns that her shop has been vandalized, she quickly suspects Alan of being the culprit and the police take him in for questioning. Alan is proven innocent when the police catch a gang of children trying to sell videos stolen from The Kabin. A few weeks later, Rita disappears and Alan is again questioned by the police. He is once more cleared when evidence of his alleged involvement is proven insufficient. He is nevertheless suspected by his fellow neighbours of killing Rita and burning her at the building site. Alan later gets drunk at The Rovers, prompting Rita's longtime friend and neighbour, Percy Sugden (Bill Waddington), to confront him about her fate. When Percy continues to pester Alan over what he supposedly did to Rita, he threatens to attack Percy—which prompts his friends Don Brennan (Geoffrey Hinsliff) and Alf Roberts (Bryan Mosley), along with Jack Duckworth (Bill Tarmey), to stand up to Alan. He grabs a bottle and prepares to attack them until Jenny's best friend Sally Webster (Sally Dynevor) rushes into The Rovers—telling them that the police have found something at the building site. This causes everyone to rush outside, assuming Rita's body that has been found. Alan reluctantly joins them after Alf's wife and Gail's mother, Audrey Roberts (Sue Nicholls), sarcastically asks if he is bothered enough to feel curious in knowing what the police will find at the site.

It soon transpires that Rita had actually gone over to Blackpool to recover from a breakdown, which occurred in light of Alan's treatment of her. Despite this and the fact that nothing was found at the building site, Alan loses his job because of the trouble it had caused with the police. Alan becomes overly bitter and swears revenge on Rita, blaming her for ruining his life.

Eventually Alan learns of Rita's whereabouts after overhearing The Rovers' landlord, Alec Gilroy (Roy Barraclough), confiding to Bet that Rita is in Blackpool. Alan later follows Bet to Blackpool, with the intention of finding Rita and taking her back to Weatherfield to prove he didn't kill her. He forces his way into the hotel where Rita was staying, only to find Bet there instead. Alan threatens her and demands to know where Rita is. As Bet is unwilling to tell him, Alan deduces that Rita will come back to the hotel after finding her clothes in the wardrobe. He then returns to his car to wait for her. As Rita walks back towards the hotel, Alan spots her and orders her to get in his car. When she refuses, Alan forces her into the passenger seat, only for her to jump out as he returns to the driver's side. Alan promptly chases Rita across the road, where they run into the direction of an oncoming Blackpool tram—which narrowly misses Rita but hits Alan, killing him. The tram promptly stops at the impact of the accident, and Bet rushes outside to comfort Rita.

Later on, Alan is confirmed to have officially died and news of his death became public knowledge in Weatherfield. Jenny is devastated to learn about her father's death. She attends his funeral with Martin and Sally, along with Sally's husband Kevin (Michael Le Vell). The impact of Alan's torment on Rita and his subsequent death continues to negatively affect her relationship with Jenny. However, they eventually reconcile when Jenny comes to accept that her father was the only person to blame for his own downfall and this signals the end of Alan's reign of terror once and for all.

== Reception ==
The character Alan Bradley was well received by critics. The episode that aired on 13 March 1989, where Alan tried to kill Rita by suffocating her, attracted over 25 million viewers when combining the original broadcast with the omnibus, while the following episode on 15 March 1989 with Rita in hospital and Alan hiding from the police, attracted 26.93 million viewers, which is the highest combined rating in the show's history. The episode that aired on 20 March 1989 attracted an audience of 19.01 million for its original Monday night broadcast and was the shows highest-rated single broadcast of the year.

The first episode of series 2 of Phoenix Nights contains a visual reference to the death of Alan Bradley, where flowers with a sign 'In Memory of Alan, 8 Dec 89', RIP' are tied to a lamp-post beside the tram line.

Both Eden and co-star Barbara Knox have stated that they regret the death of Alan, wishing that he had returned in some fashion at a later time. Alan Bradley has consistently been voted one of Coronation Street's greatest villains in several polls since.

On 8 December 2009, Mark Eden unveiled a blue plaque to mark the 20-year anniversary of the screening of the famous Coronation Street episode. The plaque is located outside The Strand Hotel, North Promenade, Blackpool which was the venue chosen for the filming of much of the footage.

In further episodes of Coronation Street references to Alan occur, most recently in the episode aired April 2015 when Jenny called into Rita's shop The Kabin, in which Norris Cole asked her if she was travelling to the shops by tram; intended as a cutting quip referencing the way Alan died. In June 2016, Alan's daughter Jenny would save her ex-boyfriend Kevin Webster's (Michael Le Vell) little son Jack (Kyran Bowes) from a tram – once again referring to Alan's iconic demise.

== See also ==
- List of soap opera villains
- Fictional portrayals of psychopaths
