= List of Coronation Street characters introduced in 1985 =

Coronation Street is a British soap opera, broadcast on ITV since 1960. This is a list of characters who made their debut in 1985 in order of first appearance, including Gloria Todd (Sue Jenkins), whose time on the show included brief relationships with Alan Bradley and Mike Baldwin; and Martin Platt, who married Gail Tilsley, and was a regular on the show until 2005, before returning for three episodes in 2018.

== Gloria Todd ==
Gloria Todd
- Coronation Street character
- Portrayed by: Sue Jenkins
- Duration: 1985–1988
- First appearance: 16 January 1985
- Last appearance: 30 November 1988
- Introduced by: Mervyn Watson
In-universe information
- Occupation: Barmaid
- Half-brothers: Richard Armstrong

Gloria Todd was played by Sue Jenkins between 1985 and 1988. She famously served as a bridesmaid at Bet Lynch's 1987 wedding to Alec Gilroy, looking not dissimilar to a milking maid. Gloria was unlucky in love, at one point having a daliance with Alan Bradley. She left the street after stealing the boyfriend of The Rovers cleaner Sandra Stubbs. Sandra called Gloria a tart and threw a pint of beer in her face. Gloria had been a barmaid at the Rovers Return Inn.

== Connie Clayton ==
Connie Clayton
- Coronation Street character
- Portrayed by: Susan Brown (1985); Irene Skillington (2000)
- Duration: 1985, 2000
- First appearance: 28 January 1985
- Last appearance: 10 December 2000
- Introduced by: Mervyn Watson (1985); Jane MacNaught (2000)
In-universe information
- Husband: Harry Clayton (1966—????)
- Daughters: Andrea Clayton; Sue Clayton
- Grandsons: Paul Clayton

Constance "Connie" Clayton and her family moved into 11 Coronation Street in January 1985 and turned their front room into a work room so that Connie could run her dressmaking business. Jack Duckworth bought his wife Vera a dress length of silver lurex and Connie took on the job of producing a dress that 'will make Joan Collins look like a lollipop lady'. Vera was not happy with the results and whilst Connie agreed that the dress looked a right mess on her, she insisted that it fitted properly and was worth the £45 fee but Jack and Vera refused to pay and a feud developed between the families. The fighting between the families was ruining Terry Duckworth's romance with Andrea Clayton and so he tried to pay the bill for his mother, but Connie refused to accept his money. The feud over the dress was soon forgotten when Andrea announced that she was pregnant with Terry's child. Connie stood by her daughter and agreed to look after the baby while Andrea attended university. After Vera started announcing her own plans for her new grandchild, the family did a moonlight flit and moved away from Weatherfield. In December 2000, Connie returned briefly to visit her grandson Paul in hospital after Vera had donated a kidney to him in order to save his life after Terry had refused to be a donor. Connie made peace with Vera and thanked her for saving Paul's life.

== Harry Clayton ==
Harry Clayton
- Coronation Street character
- Portrayed by: Johnny Leeze
- First appearance: 28 January 1985
- Last appearance: 4 September 1985
- Introduced by: Mervyn Watson
In-universe information
- Wife: Connie Clayton (1966–?)
- Daughters: Andrea Clayton; Sue Clayton
- Grandsons: Paul Clayton

Harold "Harry" Clayton was a trombone playing milkman, who, with his family, bought 11 Coronation Street off Bill Webster in 1985. A feud developed with the Duckworths, who lived next door, after they refused to pay a bill for a dress that Harry's wife, Connie, had made for Vera and eventually escalated to violence in the Rovers Return Inn when Jack asked Harry if he was sure that the father of their daughter Andrea's baby was his son Terry. Harry and Connie stood by their daughter and agreed to look after the baby while Andrea attended university. After Vera started announcing her own plans for her new grandchild, the family did a moonlight flit and moved away from Weatherfield.

== Sue Clayton ==
Sue Clayton
- Coronation Street character
- Portrayed by: Jane Hazlegrove
- First appearance: 30 January 1985
- Last appearance: 28 August 1985
- Introduced by: Mervyn Watson
In-universe information
- Father: Harry Clayton
- Mother: Connie Clayton
- Sisters: Andrea Clayton
- Nephews: Paul Clayton

Susan "Sue" Clayton was played by Jane Hazlegrove. Sue had just left school when she was first seen and later secured a job in a local bakery. Sue left Weatherfield with the rest of her family in a moonlight flit to get away from the Duckworths in order to raise her sister Andrea's baby.

Speaking of her time as Sue, Hazlegrove revealed, "I was full of trepidation. There were no nerves whatsoever when I was 16. I knew it was a big job but I was incredibly confident". In 2019, Hazlegrove returned to Coronation Street as a new regular character, Bernie Winter.

== Andrea Clayton ==
Andrea Clayton
- Coronation Street character
- Portrayed by: Caroline O'Neill
- Duration: 1985, 2000–2001
- First appearance: 30 January 1985
- Last appearance: 7 November 2001
- Introduced by: Mervyn Watson (1985); Jane McNaught (2000)
In-universe information
- Father: Harry Clayton
- Mother: Connie Clayton
- Sisters: Sue Clayton
- Sons: Paul Clayton

Andrea Clayton moved into 11 Coronation Street in January 1985 with her parents and younger sister.

Whilst studying for her A-levels, Andrea started dating next door neighbour Terry Duckworth behind her parents' backs and was shocked to learn that she was pregnant, but refused to allow Terry to be part of the child's life, even though he wanted to stand by her. Her parents decided that the best way forward was for Connie to look after the baby while Andrea went to university. When Vera Duckworth wanted to be involved in plans for her grandchild's future, the Clayton family packed up overnight and left Weatherfield. Eventually word reached Terry that Andrea had given birth to a boy and named him Paul.

Andrea visited the Duckworths' in November 2000 and explained that Paul needed a kidney transplant urgently. Although Terry exploited the situation for his gain, Vera stepped in and saved Paul by giving him one of her kidneys. In November 2001, Andrea brought Paul to Jack's 65th birthday celebrations. This was her last appearance on the show.

== Wilf Starkey ==
Wilf Starkey
- Coronation Street character
- Portrayed by: Jim Bywater
- First appearance: 11 February 1985
- Last appearance: 14 August 1985
- Introduced by: Mervyn Watson
In-universe information
- Occupation: Cellarman

Wilf Starkey, portrayed by Jim Bywater, was a cellarman who worked at The Rovers Return for six months. He applied for the position just after Bet Lynch (Julie Goodyear) was promoted to manager and was immediately appointed. Wilf saw himself as a student of human nature, which he wrote a book about whilst working at the Rovers. Wilf was very chatty with customers and tried to get the other staff on side, such as Hilda Ogden (Jean Alexander) who read tea leaves and predicted that he would travel east. He also joined the Rovers pub quiz team when Newtown and Ridley held a Brainiest Pub competition. When playing against The White Horse, he knew the most about sports. However, he was removed from the team as the brewery didn't allow staff to play and was replaced with Percy Sugden (Bill Waddington). He then left the Rovers when Bet's new boyfriend Frank Mills (Nigel Gregory) was a more appealing barman.

== George Wardle ==
George Wardle
- Coronation Street character
- Portrayed by: Ron Davies
- Duration: 1985–1986
- First appearance: 11 March 1985
- Last appearance: 12 February 1986
- Introduced by: Mervyn Watson
In-universe information
- Occupation: Van Driver
- Wife: Myra Wardle (backstory)

George Wardle was a van driver for Baldwin's Casuals, where he worked with Ivy Tilsley (Lynne Perrie). He knew Ivy from church as he was also a Catholic. However, he was also a divorcee and therefore seen as still married in the eyes of the church. This proved to be problematic when he and Ivy got engaged. Ivy was a widow as her husband Bert Tilsley (Peter Dudley) died in 1984 and was initially shy due to that.

Seeing how important religion was to her, George lied and said he was a widower. They were inseparable until Ivy found out that George was divorced rather than widowed, until her son Brian Tilsley (Christopher Quinten) told her she'd thrown away a good opportunity. George also wanted a register office wedding, whereas Ivy wanted a church wedding or no wedding. Ivy then did offer to give up church so they could be together, but George decided their relationship was over and moved on to Pauline Walsh. Mike Baldwin (Johnny Briggs) fired George in 1986 as he clocked Pauline into work when she was actually out shopping.

== Stella Rigby ==
Stella Rigby
- Coronation Street character
- Portrayed by: Vivienne Ross
- Duration: 1985, 1989, 1992-1993, 1995
- First appearance: 18 March 1985
- Last appearance: 2 October 1995
- Introduced by: Mervyn Watson
In-universe information
- Occupation: Pub Landlady
- Husband: Paul Rigby

Stella Rigby was the landlady of The White Swan, which was another pub owned by Newton and Ridley. She struck up a friendship with The Rovers' landlady, Bet Lynch (Julie Goodyear). She appeared intermittently between March 1985 and October 1995. Stella's husband, Paul Rigby, was introduced in 1988; he appeared more frequently, believing he was friends with Bet's husband, Alec Gilroy (Roy Barraclough). Paul wasn't really faithful to Stella, as he always ended up chasing after younger women, which was something she tolerated. Due to their husbands' later disputes, Stella and Bet fell out, but reconciled in 1992. Stella was last seen in 1995, when she trained Jim McDonald (Charlie Lawson) and Liz McDonald (Beverly Callard) at The White Swan, as they were taken on as managers at the brewery.

== Michelle Robinson ==
Michelle Robinson
- Coronation Street character
- Portrayed by: Stephanie Tague
- First appearance: 15 May 1985
- Last appearance: 17 July 1995
- Introduced by: Mervyn Watson
In-universe information
- Occupation: Shop Assistant
- Father: Mr Robinson

Michelle Robinson, portrayed by Stephanie Tague, was a friend of Andrea Clayton (Caroline O'Neill) who first appeared in May 1985 after Andrea arranged a double date for herself and Terry Duckworth (Nigel Pivaro) as well as Michelle and Kevin Webster (Michael Le Vell). Andrea and Terry left Kevin and Michelle, who Kevin was expecting to not be very good looking until he got to meet Michelle. Michelle worked at a chemist and came from a Christian background. Upon meeting Kevin, she was going out with Malcolm Nuttall (Michael Ball), but was not serious about their relationship, so she decided to dump him for Kevin, which he didn't take gently so Kevin put him in his place.

On their first date, Kevin took Michelle out in her mother's car and got lost along a country lane. To begin with, things began quite smoothly because Michelle's parents liked Kevin and Kevin's landlady, Hilda Ogden (Jean Alexander) liked Michelle and both enjoyed each other's company. However, Kevin began to think of having a future with Michelle and talked about marriage, for which she wasn't ready and called off the relationship with the hope of remaining friends, but Kevin decided to avoid her for his own sake.

== Malcolm Nuttall ==
Malcolm Nuttall, portrayed by future singing star Michael Ball, was a tennis coach who played and was the boyfriend of Michelle Robinson (Stephanie Tague). They were together when she first met future boyfriend, Kevin Webster (Michael Le Vell). Their relationship wasn't serious, which was why she dumped him for Kevin. Malcolm accused Kevin of poaching his girlfriend, to which Kevin punched him showing he was prepared to fight for Michelle, causing Malcolm to back down.

== Frank Mills ==
Frank Mills
- Coronation Street character
- Portrayed by: Nigel Gregory
- Duration: 1985–1986
- First appearance: 1 July 1985
- Last appearance: 1 January 1986
- Introduced by: Mervyn Watson
In-universe information
- Occupation: Barman

Frank Mills, portrayed by Nigel Gregory, was a barman at a Blackpool hotel where Bet Lynch (Julie Goodyear), Rita Fairclough (Barbara Knox) and Mavis Riley (Thelma Barlow) stayed when they went on holiday. Bet hoped to meet a man, but her and Rita found themselves bored in the hotel bar. He got Bet and Rita to try his ownmade cocktail The White Tower and told them he wanted to start his own bar, but didn't know where to look. Bet said she'd put word in for him with Newton and Ridley. A month later, Frank was sacked from the hotel for arguing with the manager. He then went to look for work in Weatherfield, much to Bet's delight and began a relationship with her. However, his wandering eyes turned to barmaid Gloria Todd (Sue Jenkins). After flirting with Gloria, he made a pass, which Bet found out about and ordered Frank out of her life.

== Sam Tindall ==
Sam Tindall
- Coronation Street character
- Portrayed by: Tom Mennard
- Duration: 1985–1989
- First appearance: 2 September 1985
- Last appearance: 17 May 1989
- Introduced by: Mervyn Watson

Sam Tindall was a recurring character played by Tom Mennard for various stints between 1985 and 1989.

Sam himself never married, and was kept company by his dog Dougal, which he kept in a bag. In September 1985, while readying himself for the bowls tournament, he took a fancy to Phyllis Pearce. Phyllis was after Percy Sugden, Sam's competitor in the tournament. Phyllis liked the thought of making Percy jealous by being seen with Sam and so she told Sam she would go to the bowling club outing to Southport with whoever won the finals. In fact, Percy had no interest in Phyllis and was so horrified at the thought of Phyllis having him all to herself that he considered throwing the game - but he was too proud to go through with it and he won. For Phyllis, Sam had now served his purpose, but the battle for her hand continued for some years and Sam was a semi-regular fixture in the Rovers Return Inn and Jim's Café until 1989. Phyllis took more interest in Sam when she found out he won a fortune on the pools in the 1950s and spent it on property. Sam was now penniless as his houses were falling down but he saw this as a way in with Phyllis and made the most of it. He was Phyllis's date for her 65th birthday party, and they were having a good time until Sam saw Phyllis dancing with Percy and accused Phyllis of playing with his affections. Phyllis was upset, until he revealed that he had no fortune to bequeath, upon which the status quo was restored.

In December 1985, Sam offered Terry Duckworth and Curly Watts the use of Dougal to catch a rat in the builder's yard. He tried to swindle them by passing off a ferret as a rat so they'd pay him to catch it. Also that month, Sam won a Christmas pudding in a pub raffle, but a drunken Alf Roberts sat on it at his stag party, and a forlorn Sam annoyed Bet Lynch by accusing her of losing it.

In April 1987, Sam turned up at one of Percy's over-60s tea-dance sessions. Percy entered the group in a competition but the dancers preferred Sam to lead them and voted Percy down. Percy hit back by cancelling their entry into the competition.

Later that year, Sam briefly pursued Vera Duckworth's mother Amy Burton, but by 1988 he was after Phyllis again. Phyllis had come to like having Sam around but she still used him to get to Percy - on one occasion, she complained to Percy that Sam was pestering her, and was then pleased when Percy berated Sam when he overheard Sam telling people he never had much time for women. He last called at the café in May 1989.

== Janet Bamford ==
Janet Bamford
- Coronation Street character
- Portrayed by: Hope Johnstone
- Duration: 1985–1988
- First appearance: 28 October 1985
- Last appearance: 9 March 1988
- Introduced by: Mervyn Watson
In-universe information
- Husband: John Bamford

Janet Bamford was a secretary at the Weatherfield Recorder, and worked as Ken Barlow's personal assistant. Janet worked mornings only and cared for her disabled husband John the rest of the time. Unlike her predecessor Sally Waterman, Janet had no journalistic ambitions and was content with her minimal responsibilities, including making the coffee. In her three years at the Recorder, she presented no problems to Ken and they got along well.

In 1988, the Clarion Group bought Bob Statham's share of the Recorder. Statham had been a sleeping partner but the Clarion's boss, Nick Cavanagh, had big ideas for the paper and asked Janet to work overtime however due to John being confined to bed, Janet had to decline. Ken considered the matter closed but Nick pursued it and convinced Ken that they needed someone more dynamic in the office full-time. Ken reluctantly gave Janet her notice. When given the news, Janet was understanding and told Ken she'd been expecting it.
