= Rita Tanner =

Fictional character from Coronation Street

- Coronation Street character
- Portrayed by: Barbara Knox
- Duration: 1964, 1972–present
- First appearance: 2 December 1964
- Introduced by: Tim Aspinall (1964); Brian Armstrong (1972)
- Spin-off appearances: Coronation Street: The Cruise (1995); Coronation Street: A Knights Tale (2010); Coronation Street: Text Santa Special (2012–2013); Rita & Me (2014)
In-universe information
- Other names: Rita Littlewood; Rita Bates; Rita Fairclough; Rita Sullivan
- Occupation: Businesswoman; Newsagent; Belly Dancer
- Father: Harold Littlewood
- Mother: Amy Littlewood
- Husband: Len Fairclough (1977–1983); Ted Sullivan (1992); Dennis Tanner (2012–2015)
- Adoptive daughters: Sharon Gaskell (foster); Jenny Bradley (foster)
- Stepsons: Stanley Fairclough
- Grandmothers: Louisa
- Uncles: Sam Littlewood
- Aunts: Claire

Rita Tanner (also Littlewood, Bates, Fairclough and Sullivan) is a fictional character from the British ITV soap opera Coronation Street. Played by veteran actress Barbara Knox, the character first appeared on-screen as "Rita Littlewood" for one episode on 2 December 1964, before returning as a full-time cast member on 31 January 1972.

Although having no children of her own, Rita is known for being something of a mother figure to a number of the street’s female residents, including Sharon Gaskell (Tracie Bennett), Jenny Bradley (Sally Ann Matthews), Sally Webster (Sally Dynevor), Leanne Battersby (Jane Danson), Tina McIntyre (Michelle Keegan) and Gemma Winter (Dolly-Rose Campbell).

== Development ==
The producers of the show decided to pair Rita with Mavis Wilton portrayed by Thelma Barlow by giving Mavis a job in Rita's newsagents shop; the characters' relationship has been described as a chalk and cheese comedy partnership. Christine Geraghty has cited Rita and Mavis' friendship as an example of a soap opera portraying an important, stable, intimate female relationship: "Rita is Mavis's boss, but she is also one of her closest friends".

Prior to 2006, Knox was reportedly the highest-paid actress with the show, until Anne Kirkbride began to earn more. Knox's salary is £260,000 a year which producers pay to keep her in a secure future with the series.

In January 2009, it was speculated that Knox and other veteran actors were going to be axed from the show in a bid to save money but this was later denied by a Coronation Street spokesman. Knox was temporarily written out of the series in August 2009 for health reasons. She returned to the show on 15 March 2010. Her character was said to be on a world cruise with friend Doreen Fenwick, after selling her share of The Kabin to Norris Cole (Malcolm Hebden).

In April 2010 a spokesman for Coronation Street announced that Knox has a job for life on the show and that she will continue to play her character Rita for as long as she wants to be there.

In May 2011, a Daily Mirror reporter announced that Rita and Emily Bishop (Eileen Derbyshire) would become love rivals, following Dennis Tanner's (Philip Lowrie) return. Lowrie hinted at a possible relationship between Dennis and Rita, saying "I asked Barbara Knox, who plays Rita, how many husbands has she had? She said three, so there might be a fourth, you never know!" Rita and Dennis begin a relationship and series producer Phil Collinson stated "Rita genuinely loves Dennis very much. Their storyline harks back to 1964, when he looked after her and took her in. Now he's grown to love her because she's been able to look after him. I like that we can tell a love story of people in their 70s, and it's a relationship that we're really committed to. I'd love for Rita to have a wedding, so watch this space! And if we did have one, she'd be Mrs Tanner – how great is that?" Collinson later revealed Rita and Dennis would get married and their wedding would coincide with the Queen's Diamond Jubilee celebrations.

In August 2017, the character was involved in a storyline which saw her diagnosed with a brain tumour. Many of the show's fans were devastated by the idea that such a beloved and iconic character might be killed off. The storyline received a lot of media attention and criticism from the viewers, as it began shortly after the death of Ashley Thomas, a character from fellow ITV programme Emmerdale, who had a seemingly similar diagnosis. Within days of the storyline being introduced a "Save Rita" campaign was set up online and attracted over 500 signatures. A spokesperson for Coronation Street later denied that the character was going to die, and confirmed that Knox remains very much part of the show.

In December 2019, it was reported that Rita would feature in a big storyline over Christmas. Producer Ian Macleod relished the chance to give Barbara Knox the spotlight after all of these decades in Weatherfield. "It's a really good story actually and Barbara Knox, as is always the case, if you give her something big to do she nails it," he said. "I'm not saying that with any hint of surprise in my voice, she's been doing it for decades. She's so good at it and it's a great story. She's embraced it with the gusto you'd expect from someone who's been doing it for so long."

== Storylines ==
Rita was first seen as a belly dancer who is set to perform at the Viaduct Sporting Club. At first she appeared with local resident Stan Ogden (Bernard Youens) and was invited for a drink at The Rovers Return Inn public house. But one of the punters, Dennis Tanner (Philip Lowrie), recognises Rita when they encounter each other in the pub. She cannot find gigs for the week and persuades a reluctant Dennis to let her sleep in the bed owned by his mother Elsie Tanner (Pat Phoenix) while she's away. Dennis worries what people will say about Rita staying with him. When fellow occupant Emily Nugent (Eileen Derbyshire) calls on Dennis, she is shocked to see Rita in her nightie. The next morning, Lucille Hewitt (Jennifer Moss) wonders why Dennis is making up a breakfast tray. Dennis tells Rita of his disillusionment with show business. Charlie Moffitt (Gordon Rollings) slips on the joists in the loft and puts his foot through the ceiling of Elsie's room. He apologises to the figure in the bed and realises it is not Elsie. Dennis pays for the hole to be repaired when Charlie blackmails him about the incident, but Elsie sees the hole and hears about Rita, who does not reappear for another seven years.

In January 1972, Rita resurfaces with her common-law partner Harry Bates (William Simons) and his twelve-year-old son Terry (John Barrett). The relationship suffers when Rita begins spending time with various men, initially dating neighbour Ken Barlow (William Roache). Rita then starts an on-off relationship with Len Fairclough (Peter Adamson). Len arrives at Harry's house to return a scarf that Rita left in his van. Len tells his friends Jerry Booth (Graham Haberfield) and Ray Langton (Neville Buswell), to stay out of the house that evening as he's entertaining a lady, but Ray delays leaving until Rita arrives. Rita tells Len that her husband is often away working on building motorways, and is clearly not happy. Len tells her how much he likes her but then Rita's current love interest Alf Roberts (Bryan Mosley) interrupts them.

Alf tells Rovers barmaid Betty Turpin (Betty Driver) that Rita's house is due for demolition and Len, as a councillor, is on the housing committee, and he thinks this is the reason for her interest in him. Rita tells Len she has to vacate by the end of the week. Len agrees to help her as she's on the housing list. Rita introduces Len to Harry, convinced Len will get them a house. Len arranges an appointment for them, and they are offered a flat but need a marriage certificate and they reveal to Len that they have lied about being married, since Harry already has a wife. Len refuses to pull strings for them and is annoyed at being lied to. Harry kicks Rita out and she seeks help from Len, but he declines having her live with him long term at No.9. When Elsie refuses to take her in, her friend Maggie Clegg (Irene Sutcliffe) invites Rita to stay as long as she has to but no longer. Harry arrives back at the site. Len tells him that he's only interested in Rita's welfare, but Rita tells Len she doesn't want to go back to Harry. Two months later, Len gets tickets for the opening of the new Victoria Street Working Men's Club and invites Elsie and Alan Howard (Alan Browning). Len is shocked when Rita is introduced singing on stage, though Elsie thinks he knew all along that she would be there. After her set, Len helps her when she is bothered by a drunk, and brings Rita to his table. Elsie is cold with her. Rita says she hasn't been with Harry Bates and his family for two months. She and Len agree to get to know one another again. From June 1972, the character is once again credited as Rita Littlewood.

Rita turns up at The Rovers to see Len and auditions for Alec Gilroy. Ray and Jerry do not like her, but she gets a regular spot from Alec. Jerry tells Ray he thinks Rita is a gold-digger. Rather than be taken out for the night by Len, she makes a meat and potato pie for the lads and wins Jerry over. Len takes her home and next morning Ray and Jerry discover he hasn't come back but has spent the night with her. Len brings Rita to the opening of a new betting shop. Benny Lewis (Jeremy Young), the owner, talks Rita into an afternoon job as a hostess. Len thinks he's got designs on her. Rita refuses to clean for Benny. Benny asks Rita to join the staff permanently. Rita is not sure and asks Len who tells her it's her decision. Rita still cannot decide whether to take the job with Benny. Len books a meal out for the two of them. Benny also asks Rita to come round to his flat that night but she turns him down. Len tells Rita he cannot take her out after all. Benny entertains Rita in his new luxury flat above the betting shop though few of the remote control things work properly. Stan's partner Hilda Ogden (Jean Alexander) finds them there together. Rita tells Benny she will work for him. Hilda gleefully gossips to Len that Rita is with Benny. Rita stands Benny up to go out with Len. Rita skives off work to be with Benny. Rita passes on an invite to Len for drinks at Benny's flat.

Benny tries to get Rita to stay for a few drinks but she refuses as she has a date with Len. Rita and Len join Elsie and Alan for a drink in The Rovers before they go out and the ice begins to thaw between Elsie and Rita. Jerry advises Benny to tell Rita he's serious about her as Len doesn't want anything permanent. Benny questions Rita about Len's treatment of her. Rita tells Len that Benny is always asking questions about him as he's interested in her. Benny asks Len how serious he is about Rita. He tells him he is not. Benny rings Rita and passes on what Len just said. She's hurt. Len tells Rita to choose between him and Benny. Benny asks Rita to marry him and she accepts him. Jerry tells Len that Rita is not steady enough for him. Benny presents Rita with an expensive engagement ring. Jerry tells Benny that he was wrong and that Len has real feelings for Rita. Benny asks to see Len and tells him that he's not certain Rita wants to marry him and that she and Len are meant for each other. He wants Len to confess his feelings to Rita. Len tells Rita that Benny is backing out and leaving the field open for him. He confesses he needs her and Rita goes off with him, leaving a disappointed Benny behind. Lucille spreads the word that Rita's engagement to Benny is over. Len insists that Rita give Benny his ring back. The residents get the wrong idea and think that Len is marrying Rita. Rita tells Len that she tried to give the ring back to Benny but he told her to keep it.

Rita tells Len that her landlady Lena Norris has told her that she cannot have men visitors after 9 pm. Jerry warns Len that Rita has given up a lot for him and hasn't gotten much back. Len gets rid of Jerry to entertain Rita at No.9. Jerry interrupts Len and Rita just as they get amorous on the sofa. Having got rid of Jerry, Len and Rita start cuddling on the sofa. Ray interrupts them to borrow money off Len to take Mandy Taylor (Sarah Twist) out. Jerry gatecrashes Len and Rita's night again to collect his pen and notepad. He is soon followed by Ray, who abandoned his date as he found Mandy too hard to keep up with. Len pays him to go to the Rovers. Len sets up a rota so he can have time alone with Rita at No.9. Ray and Jerry are miffed that they each get one evening a week while Len gets two. Benny realises nearly £5,000 has been stolen. In his time of need, he calls on Rita before informing the police.

Det Insp Patterson (Tony Steedman) investigates the burglary and interviews Rita and Benny about the routine of banking the money and who had the keys to the flat. Benny tells Ray and Len that Patterson thinks the keys they and Rita had were used in the robbery. Benny sacks Len. Rita takes him to task for it. Rita tells Len he won't have time to run the yard and be a councillor. She makes him buy Ray and Jerry a drink. Rita tells a worried Elsie about the night club deal. Benny feels life is looking up with the new business venture. He gets Rita to support him in a meeting to discuss terms with attendees Jimmy Frazer (John Barrie) and Al respectively. That day, Elsie join Rita and Benny in meeting Jimmy and Al to discuss the terms. Jimmy and Benny agree to be equal partners in the new club venture with Al looking after Jimmy's interests in his absence. Rita decides to take the job of hostess at the Club, keeping on the Betting Shop as well. Mayor Harold Chapman (Frank Crompton) tells Len he's in for a chance of being the next Mayor of Weatherfield and tells him to look out for a suitable Mayoress, insinuating that Rita doesn't cut the mustard.

Len asks Benny to drop Rita from The Capricorn. He refuses. So Rita instead helps Benny and Al hold auditions for dolly birds, hostesses and strippers at Benny's flat as the decorators are still at the club. Len asks Rita to drop the idea of being hostess. She wonders why he's changed his mind. Rita then seeks help from fellow punter Billy Walker (Kenneth Farrington) with embarrassing Len in front of Mayor Alderman Chapman at the opening of The Capricorn. Rita gets into a fight with a drunken woman and ends up on Chapman's lap, all to the delight of Alf and Alderman Rogers. Alf tells Rita that Len is up for Mayor of Weatherfield. Rita rows with Len in the Rovers when he accuses her of being too common. She pours a drink over him and walks out. Len pushes for Alan to fix his van and tells Alf that he and Rita have split up. Rita notices how much Alan is drinking at the club. Rita worries that Al is drinking too much. Elsie becomes suspicious of Al's involvement with Rita. Rita carries Al home in the early hours. She takes his keys and gives them to Billy in the morning. Elsie gives the keys back to Al, viciously, wondering what he was doing with Rita. In a panic Al tries to make Elsie see there's nothing between him and Rita, but then he refuses to give Hilda a sub as Rita is not happy with her work. Hilda insinuates that Al is seeing Rita and is sacked by Al later on. Hilda tells Elsie she was sacked because she knew too much about Al and Rita. Elsie decides to ask Rita what's going on. Rita tells Elsie there's nothing between Al and her – it's the booze she's got to worry about. On Christmas Day, 1972, the residents gather in the select of the Rovers for the 1940s show as Rita plays Marlene Dietrich.

Len is appointed Deputy Mayor. Rita avoids Len. He gives her an invitation via Jerry for a private drink. Jerry tries to speak to Rita about Len but Hilda interrupts. Len worries that Rita will think he's only interested in her now that he knows he won't be Mayor. Elsie speaks to Rita on his behalf but she's afraid that she'll be thrown to one side again as Len thinks she's not good enough, even though she needs him and knows he needs her. Elsie pushes Len to keep on pursuing Rita. Ray thinks Len is better off without Rita. Rita agrees to go to the pictures with Ray, annoying Len when Elsie tells him. Ena Sharples (Violet Carson) asks Bet Lynch (Julie Goodyear), Rita and Norma Ford (Diana Davies) how Minnie Caldwell (Margot Bryant) has been behaving while she's been away. A worried Ray asks Rita to explain to Len that there's nothing between them but she refuses. Rita allows Len to buy her a drink. Rita introduces Len to her "manager" Johnny Mann (Charles Pemberton).

Rita takes a job singing in a nightclub, and when Len Fairclough purchases a failing newsagents, he installs Rita as manageress of The Kabin, a corner shop which also serves light food, with Mavis Riley as her assistant. She becomes Rita Fairclough when she and Len marry in April 1977. The marriage runs into trouble in early 1980, when sick of being taken for granted and living in what she describes as squalor, Rita leaves Len and thanks to Ralph Lancaster's help, attempts to regain her cabaret career. After a physical altercation with Len, she flees to Blackpool, where Len tracks her down after several months and she agrees to return to Coronation Street, but only if Len renovates their home and changes his ways. In the summer of 1981, Rita and Len are rejected for being adoptive parents due to their age, (Rita told the agency she is aged 40, despite actress Knox being 48 at the time), but begin fostering children, enjoying their first foster son, John, despite the challenges. In March 1982, they take in foster daughter Sharon Gaskell (Tracie Bennett), who becomes part of their family. After Len builds a new home on the vacant lot of No. 7, the Faircloughs and Sharon move into the new home, but Sharon eventually moves away to work in Sheffield, shortly after she had attempted to break up Gail & Brian Tilsley's marriage. Len is killed in a car accident in December 1983 and Rita is devastated to learn he had been having an affair. Sharon briefly returns to comfort Rita before returning to Sheffield in early 1984. Sharon would not be seen again until 1999.

In January 1986, Rita takes in another foster daughter; Jenny Bradley (Sally Ann Matthews). A few days later, she meets Jenny's estranged father Alan (Mark Eden) and helps him reconcile with his daughter. She soon begins a relationship with Alan, which is abruptly threatened after he starts two-timing Rita with local barmaid Gloria Todd (Sue Jenkins). It doesn't take long before Rita discovers his infidelity and she insists he choose whichever women he wants; Alan initially chooses Gloria, only for Gloria to not feel the same way and end her fling with Alan before leaving the street. Rita then allows Alan to move in to her home and he proposes marriage several times, even going as far as to arrange their wedding as a surprise to Rita, but she refuses to participate when she arrives at the registry office thinking she's a guest at another wedding. Alan is also a conman and after using Rita's capital to fund his own business enterprises, he poses as Len to the bank and re-mortgages Rita's house to start a security business when she refuses any more cash. He hires new arrival Dawn Prescott (Louise Harrison) as a receptionist and tries to rape her. Rita learns about the attack and Alan's fraudulent activities before reporting him to the building society. In March 1989, in retaliation, he tries to suffocate her but fails and is found not guilty of attempted murder. He starts stalking Rita, who has a breakdown and escapes to Blackpool, but in December 1989 Alan tracks her down and tries to make her return to Weatherfield, but he is run down by a tram and killed in the attempt. Rita attempts to make amends with Jenny during Christmas that year but Jenny angrily rejects her, claiming that Rita was responsible for her father's death.

By 1990, Rita has moved out of her old home. Two years later she remarries a man named Ted Sullivan (William Russell). But the marriage only lasts three months, as he dies from an inoperable brain tumour; Ted leaves everything in his will to Rita which causes her to come into conflict with his family when they accuse her of only marrying him for his money. After a court case, Rita emerges victorious and has Ted's money to supplement her income from The Kabin. Jenny returns in 1993 when she becomes aware of this and attempts to get Rita to invest in her salon but she is rejected and leaves Weatherfield once again. Throughout all her ordeals Rita is supported by close friend Bet Lynch but their friendship sours in late 1995 when Bet asks Rita to help provide the money to purchase The Rovers when it is put up for sale by Newton & Ridley. Rita comes close to agreeing but eventually withdraws prompting Bet to end her friendship with her and depart the street for good. Rita supports Mavis in 1997 when Derek dies and is heartbroken when she decides to move to Cartmel to open her own Bed & Breakfast.

When Rita collapses in her flat in July 1998 from carbon monoxide poisoning, she is saved by Alec. Realising how close he came to losing his best friend, Alec proposes to Rita. She initially turns him down, but later changes her mind and accepts. Their relationship ends several months later when they realise they cannot trust one another. Rita takes in Stacey, a local woman who tried to con Fred Elliott (John Savident) by pretending to be a Thai bride named Orchid. She had previously conned a man named Stuart (Duncan Preston), who locked her in his flat for days at a time and inflicted physical violence on her. Stuart traces her to Rita's home and breaks in, destroying her property. He threatens Rita, and though he is arrested, Rita decides to move house. Rita later moves in with her old friend Doreen Fenwick (Barbara Young), and although they initially get along well, Doreen outstays her welcome. Rita is proposed to by her friend and co-worker Norris Cole (Malcolm Hebden), she turns him down.

In December 2010, Rita is trapped in the wreckage from the 50th anniversary tram crash when the tram smashes into the side of The Kabin. Everyone thought she had gone out for dinner with an old friend, therefore nobody knew she was in the wreckage until Nick Tilsley (Ben Price) informs Norris, Emily and Mary Taylor (Patti Clare) that he saw Rita before the tram crash and that she said to him that her friend cancelled on her, thus worrying Norris, Mary, and Emily. They inform the fire crew and Rita is found. Rita survives with cuts and bruises. She is traumatised by this, with proof taking place when The Rovers burns down in 2013, Rita is flustered at the thought of the tram crash.

Rita invites Tina McIntyre (Michelle Keegan) to live with her when she is made homeless. Rita is shocked when she bumps into her old friend Dennis. As he has since fallen on hard times and is living as a homeless person, he is highly embarrassed when Rita recognises him, and he runs off. She later approaches Dennis Tanner at the soup kitchen and takes him to the Rovers to meet old friends Ken and Emily. Rita develops feelings for Dennis and tells Tina. Dennis feels guilty about living off Rita, and she supports him in his attempts to find a job but becomes depressed when he gets a job in Birmingham. Rita tells Tina that she loves Dennis and Tina reveals that he feels the same about her. When Rita returns home, she finds Dennis waiting for her. They declare their love for each other and Dennis proposes. On her wedding day in June 2012, Rita is kidnapped by loan shark, Rick Neelan (Greg Wood). He threatens to throw her into the canal if Tina does not give him a bag of drugs, which she had seized earlier in the day. Tina hands over the bag and the police arrive to arrest Rick. Rita is taken to the registry office and she marries Dennis. Rita is not very happy when Dennis decides he wants to be in the music industry again, so he contacts his old friend Ritchie de Vries (Robin Askwith). She feels insecure when Gloria Price (Sue Johnston) also decides to tag along with the whole idea, and becomes very close with Dennis, and the pair begin flirting. Rita begins a rivalry with Gloria, and when Dennis tries to look young again, Rita is not very pleased. When they are in The Rovers, Dennis calls Rita "old", telling her that Gloria is ten years younger than her. Rita subsequently throws Dennis out of their house, so he sleeps at Gloria's house on the sofa. The next day, Rita has finally forgiven Dennis for his horrible insult, but when they are in the Bistro having a Valentine's Day meal, Gloria cannot help but intervene and tells Rita that Dennis slept at her house the night before. Rita is furious and throws Dennis out again. Just as it seems that Rita and Dennis will live happily ever after, when Gloria announces she is leaving, Dennis decides to leave with Gloria at the last minute. He waves goodbye to Rita from Gloria's car as they drive out of the street and laughs. Rita looks hurt and embarrassed in front of her friends. Dennis and Gloria do not last long and he returns to the streets when she finishes with him, this results in him having a trip to hospital which Rita finds out about. On visiting Dennis in hospital, Rita tells him that she cannot forgive him for what he has done but offers him her sofa until he can sort himself out. Sometime after living together, Dennis begs Rita to take him back, but she declines, advising him that their marriage is over for good and the sooner he goes the better. In late 2016 Gemma Winter (Dolly-Rose Campbell) comes to live with Rita but clashes with Jenny who Rita recently came back into contact with.

In 2017, Rita starts becoming forgetful, starting when she forgets she bought Gemma a mug. She later accuses Gemma of stealing money that she lent to Gina Seddon (Connie Hyde), which results in Gemma and Rita falling out. They later make up but Rita's forgetfulness starts to get more frequent. She lays a place at the table for Len. Gemma confides in Rosie Webster (Helen Flanagan). When Rita writes a number of cheques for Jenny and her fiancé, Johnny Connor, (Richard Hawley)'s wedding, Gemma tries to prove to her that there's something wrong with her. Rita refuses to believe Gemma, before she collapses. She is taken to hospital, where a specialist diagnoses her with a brain tumour. She later has the tumour removed. Colin Callen (Jim Moir) tells Rita he wants to buy the Kabin. Rita and Gemma later celebrate with their friends when they find out that Rita's tumour was benign.

== Reception ==
Knox won the 1989 TV Times Award for "Best Actress". At The British Soap Awards 2004, she was presented with a "Lifetime Achievement Award" for her portrayal of Rita. The 2006 ceremony saw Knox and Malcolm Hebden, who plays Norris, win the award for "Best On-Screen Partnership." Knox was nominated for "Best Serial Drama Performance" at the National Television Awards 2018, losing out to her Coronation Street co-star, Lucy Fallon, who portrays Bethany Platt. She is a fan favourite amongst the viewers (in 2010 she was voted the 5th best character of all time).
