= Connie Hyde =

British actress (born 1969)

- Born: Constance Skov Hyde; 15 November 1969 (age 56); Macclesfield, Cheshire, England
- Occupation: Actress
- Television: The Bill (2002–2004); Coronation Street (2017–2019)
- Spouse: Finlo Corrin (m. 1997)
- Children: 2

Connie Skov Hyde (born 15 November 1969) is an English actress.

Hyde was born to an English father and Danish mother. She grew up in Haslingden in Rossendale, Lancashire.

She is best known for playing PC Cathy Bradford in The Bill from 2002 to 2004, DC Janet Miller in City Central, and Catherine Heywood in Wing and a Prayer. She has also been in Casualty, Doctors, Holby City, Dalziel and Pascoe, The Vicar of Dibley, Sharpe, Waterloo Road and the 1999 TV film The Dark Room from the novel by Minette Walters. She also appeared in a BBC Wales series, Lifeboat.

On 15 March 2017, it was announced that she had joined the cast of Coronation Street as Sally Webster's (Sally Dynevor) sister Gina Seddon, taking over the role from Julie Foy. It was announced in March 2019 that Hyde would leave Coronation Street. She made her final appearance on 1 April 2019.

Hyde is a long-term close friend of her former The Bill co-star Moya Brady, who played PC Bradford's nemesis Roberta Cryer.
