= Ranjiv =

Ranjiv may refer to:

- Ranjiv Alahan, fictional character
- Ranjiv Woochit, Mauritian politician

== See also ==
- Ranjit
