= Brenda Elder =

English actress

Rosalind Brenda Elder (born 1938) is an English actress, best remembered for her recurring roles as Barbara Black in Brookside in 1986 and Elsie Seddon, the mother of Sally Webster, in Coronation Street from 1986 to 1997.

== Television roles ==
- Coronation Street (10 roles):
  - Waitress (1964; 1 episode)
  - Customer (1967; 1 episode)
  - Mrs Bolan (1968; 1 episode)
    Bride (1968; 1 episode)
  - Flo (1972; 1 episode)
  - Mrs. Hillkirk (1973; 1 episode)
  - Eunice Wheeler (1975; 2 episodes)
  - Woman in Corridor (1978; 1 episode)
  - Mrs. Mossop (1983; 1 episode)
  - Elsie Seddon (1986, 1989, 1990–91, 1997; 12 episodes)
- A Touch of Grace:
  - Guest Star (1973; 1 episode)
- Leave it to Charlie:
  - Mrs. Myers (1979; 1 episode)
- Brookside:
  - Barbara Black (1986)
- How We Used To Live:
  - Sarah Selby (1984–85; 8 episodes)
- Heartbeat:
  - Agnes (1998; 1 episode)
- Sherlock Holmes
  - Mrs Hayes (1986; The Priory School)
