= List of Coronation Street characters introduced in 2001 =

The following is a list of characters that first appeared in the ITV soap opera Coronation Street in 2001, by order of first appearance.

== Todd Grimshaw ==
Todd James Grimshaw is a fictional character from the long-running soap opera Coronation Street. He made his first appearance on 14 January 2001, and is played by Bruno Langley. He is the son of Eileen Grimshaw (Sue Cleaver) and brother of Jason Grimshaw (Ryan Thomas), both of whom made their first appearances in 2000. Todd is perhaps best known for his relationship with Sarah-Louise Platt (Tina O'Brien), before realizing that he was actually gay. Todd left the soap in 2004, but made two brief returns in 2007 and 2011. He returned to Coronation Street, as a regular, from November 2013 to December 2017.

== Adam Barlow ==
Adam Barlow is the son of Mike Baldwin (Johnny Briggs) and Susan Barlow (Joanna Foster). The role was originated by child actor Iain De Caestecker in 2001, making appearances on the show until 2003, but upon the character's return in 2004, he was recast with the former model, Sam Robertson. Robertson reprised the role in November 2016. In November 2016, on his return to Weatherfield, Adam is caught in Underworld by Johnny Connor (Richard Hawley) and Aidan Connor (Shayne Ward). He, Peter and his aunt Tracy Barlow (Kate Ford) visit Ken in hospital after he suffered a stroke. There, they meet Daniel Osbourne (Rob Mallard), who reveals he is Ken's son. Adam joins his family for a meal and defends Tracy against Robert Preston (Tristan Gemmill). Adam gets revenge on Robert by calling environmental health. Daniel is suspected of stealing Adam's car when Tracy and Adam visit his flat and find student debts. Adam spends the night with Maria Connor (Samia Longchambon).

== Sunita Alahan ==
Sunita Alahan (also Parekh) is a fictional character from the long-running ITV soap opera Coronation Street. She is the wife of Dev Alahan (Jimmi Harkishin) and mother to Aadi (Zennon Ditchett) and Asha Alahan (Tanisha Gorey).

Sunita's storylines have included: escaping an arranged marriage, being diagnosed with a brain tumour and an aneurysm, falsely imprisoned, being held hostage, falling pregnant with twins, becoming a single parent after divorcing her husband Dev, surviving an almighty tram crash, embarking on an affair with Karl Munro (John Michie), becoming trapped inside The Rovers Return Inn fire and later dying in hospital of a cardiac arrest caused by Karl.

== Suresh Parekh ==
Suresh Parekh
- Coronation Street character
- Portrayed by: Kaleem Janjua (2001); Ash Varrez (2004)
- Duration: 2001, 2004
- First appearance: 28 March 2001
- Last appearance: 22 November 2004
- Introduced by: Jane MacNaught (2001); Tony Wood (2004)
In-universe information
- Sisters: Grishma Parekh; Upma Parekh
- Wife: Mena Parekh
- Sons: Jayesh Parekh
- Daughters: Sunita Alahan
- Grandsons: Aadi Alahan
- Granddaughters: Asha Alahan; Jaya Parekh

Suresh Parekh, originally played by Kaleem Janjua, is the father of Sunita Parekh (Shobna Gulati) and Jayesh Parekh (Ace Bhatti). He first appears in March 2001 when he and his wife, Mena Parekh (Leena Dhingra) come looking for Sunita in Weatherfield, where she has fled to avoid the prospect of an arranged marriage to Deepak in India. After Sunita told her parents that she didn't want to return to India, they disowned her.

In September 2004, now played by Ash Varrez, Suresh and Mena return to Weatherfield for Sunita's wedding to shopkeeper, Dev Alahan (Jimmi Harkishin). Mena forgave Sunita for not wanting to marry Deepak and gave her her blessing to marry Dev. Suresh is last seen when Dev and Sunita host a dinner party for him and Mena, when Dev is called away when the burglar alarm of one of his shops goes off.

== Mena Parekh ==
Mena Parekh
- Coronation Street character
- Portrayed by: Leena Dhingra
- Duration: 2001, 2004
- First appearance: 28 March 2001
- Last appearance: 28 November 2004
- Introduced by: Jane MacNaught (2001); Tony Wood (2004)
In-universe information
- Husband: Suresh Parekh
- Sons: Jayesh Parekh
- Daughters: Sunita Alahan
- Grandsons: Aadi Alahan
- Granddaughters: Asha Alahan; Jaya Parekh

Mena Parekh, played by Leena Dhingra, is the mother of Sunita Parekh (Shobna Gulati) and Jayesh Parekh (Pal Aron/Ace Bhatti). She first appears in March 2001 when her and her husband, Suresh Parekh (Kaleem Janjua) come looking for Sunita in Weatherfield, where she has fled to avoid the prospect of an arranged marriage to Deepak in India. After Sunita told her parents that she didn't want to return to India, they disowned her.

In October 2004, Mena returned to Weatherfield with Suresh (now played by Ash Varrez) for Sunita's wedding to shopkeeper, Dev Alahan (Jimmi Harkishin). Mena forgave Sunita for not wanting to marry Deepak and mother and daughter were reunited. Mena was upset to hear from Maya Sharma (Sasha Behar) that Sunita had previously been engaged to Ciaran McCarthy (Keith Duffy), but supported her when she was in court for bigamy and subsequently imprisoned. Mena is last seen when Sunita goes to stay with her and Suresh after Maya tries to kill Sunita and Dev.

== Jayesh Parekh ==
Jayesh Parekh
- Coronation Street character
- Portrayed by: Pal Aron (2001); Ace Bhatti (2004–2006)
- Duration: 2001, 2004–2006
- First appearance: 30 March 2001
- Last appearance: 1 February 2006
- Introduced by: Jane MacNaught (2001); Tony Wood (2004)
In-universe information
- Father: Suresh Parekh
- Mother: Mena Parekh
- Sisters: Sunita Alahan
- Wife: Beth Parekh; Rhea Gujarati
- Daughters: Jaya Parekh
- Aunts: Grishma Parekh; Upma Parekh
- Nephews: Aadi Alahan
- Nieces: Asha Alahan

Jayesh Parekh is the brother of Sunita Parekh (Shobna Gulati) and followed her to Coronation Street in March 2001 when she fled her family and their attempt to force her into an arranged marriage in India. Sunita worked for Dev Alahan (Jimmi Harkishin) in his shop in Swinton and turned to her employer in her hour of need. Dev housed her in the Corner Shop flat and denied knowing her whereabouts when visited by her parents Suresh and Mena. Jayesh though was less trusting of Dev's innocence and parked himself outside the shop, seeing the curtains in the windows of the flat twitching. He confronted Dev who told him that the flat was used for stock and an employee was up there working. When Jayesh hammered on the door to the flat, it was Deirdre Rachid who answered the door and she joined in the deception, however the fugitive's brother was unconvinced by the stories he was being given and left Sunita's photo in the Rovers asking to be contacted should anyone see her.

A couple of days later, Jeyesh returned with a friend and they pushed their way into the flat, trying to physically force Sunita to return with them. Dev threatened the police and brother and sister sat down calmly to talk. Jayesh himself had entered into an unarranged marriage which had failed and Sunita took this as evidence that this was why he was on the side of their parents' plans. Jayesh warned her that his parents would turn their back on her and he would have no choice but to support them. Sunita ended up having no contact with her family for over three years.

By September 2004, Dev and Sunita's friendship had developed into love and the two were engaged. The thought of her upcoming wedding prompted Sunita to ring her mother but the phone was put down on her. It did prompt Jayesh to visit the Street though and the ice between brother and sister was quickly broken. He revealed that he had married for a second time - arranged this time as per cultural tradition - to Rhea Gujarati and the year before they had had a daughter. However he warned a tearful Sunita that her name was a forbidden word at home and that she was dead to her parents. Nevertheless, he tried to intercede on her behalf with her father and he agreed to meet his daughter in a local park but failed to turn up on that occasion. A month later, Jayesh returned and Sunita met her niece Jaya for the first time but she was upset when Jayesh made it clear that he wouldn't be attending the wedding and that the family did not approve of Dev. Dev walked in on the middle of their argument and he managed (with the help of a few glasses of whiskey) into talking Jayesh into being there for his sister at the wedding.

He did turn up as promised and brought with him an extra surprise - Sunita's parents. Mena's initially frosty countenance disappeared and she and her husband joined in with the Hindu rituals but there was a self-declared spectre at the feast: Maya Sharma (Sasha Behar), Dev's previous fiancée, intent on revenge for being dropped by him, had carried out an elaborate plan of impersonating Sunita and taking part in six sham marriages to illegal immigrants in her name, followed by a tip-off to the police. They arrested the happy couple and although Dev was released after questioning, Sunita was refused bail and imprisoned on remand pending trial. Jayesh and Mena visited Sunita in jail and from their attitude, made it clear that they suspected Dev of being guilty and not Maya who they had met and found "charming".

Jayesh was last seen in February 2006 when, following the birth of his twin nephew and niece, Aadi (Zennon Ditchett) and Asha (Tanisha Gorey), Sunita decided to leave Dev. Jayesh came and picked her and the twins up in his car and drove them away.

Jayesh did not attend Sunita's funeral in April 2013 nor did the rest of her family, as they believed that Sunita started the fire at The Rovers Return, killing herself and a firefighter Toni Griffiths (Tara Moran), bringing shame on the family. However, the real culprit was actually Sunita's former lover, Karl Munro (John Michie).

== Fiz Brown ==
Fiona "Fiz" Stape (née Brown) is a fictional character from the long-running soap opera Coronation Street. She is played by Jennie McAlpine, and made her first on-screen appearance on 20 April 2001. Fiz first appeared as the foster child of Roy (David Neilson) and Hayley Cropper (Julie Hesmondhalgh), aged 15. Fiz was only supposed to appear for 5 episodes, but McAlpine's contract was extended and Fiz became a regular character. Fiz was eventually involved in a murder storyline in which her lover, John Stape (Graeme Hawley), committed three murders and Fiz helped him dispose of the bodies. She gave birth in the live 50th anniversary episode, with McAlpine becoming the first actress in soap to give birth live.

== Shelley Unwin ==
Shelley Unwin (also Barlow) is a fictional character from the long-running soap opera Coronation Street, played by Sally Lindsay. She made her first appearance on 9 May 2001. Shelley's storylines have included a marriage to Peter Barlow (Chris Gascoyne) and an abusive and controlling relationship with Charlie Stubbs (Bill Ward), who later left her pregnant. Her mother was Bev Unwin, played by Susie Blake respectively. Shelley left the street in 2006, making her last appearance on 29 September 2006.

== Richard Hillman ==
Richard Charles Hillman is a fictional character from the long-running soap opera Coronation Street. He was played by Brian Capron, and made his first appearance on 20 June 2001. He is first seen attending his cousin Alma Halliwell's (Amanda Barrie) funeral after she died from cervical cancer. He then began a relationship with Alma's best friend Gail Platt (Helen Worth) and the two were soon married on 28 July 2002. By then, Richard had become the show's main antagonist - as his character was developed into being a serial killer. Throughout the duration of his story arc, Richard left his business partner Duggie Ferguson (John Bowe) to die after witnessing him fall through a banister; murders his ex-wife Patricia (Annabelle Apsion) with a shovel; kidnap Gail's friend Norris Cole (Malcolm Hebden) to stop him from investigating the truth about his financially bankrupt property company, "Kellett Holdings"; sets his mother-in-law Audrey Roberts' (Sue Nicholls) house on fire before going on to convince her that she has Alzheimer's disease; and attempts to kill Norris' roommate Emily Bishop (Eileen Derbyshire) with a crowbar for money — but ends up killing local landlady Maxine Peacock (Tracy Shaw) and subsequently framed his stepdaughter's ex-boyfriend Aiden Critchley (Dean Ashton) for her murder.

The character ultimately confessed his crimes to Gail in a two-handler episode on 24 February 2003 and soon departed from the show on 14 March 2003; Richard drove himself and his step-family into a canal after abducting them in a last-ditch familicide attempted, but they survived whilst he himself drowned and was later pronounced dead.

== Gary Adams ==
Gary Adams
- Coronation Street character
- Portrayed by: Samuel Kane
- First appearance: 13 July 2001 (voice)
- Last appearance: 16 July 2001

Gary Adams, portrayed by Samuel Kane, was a man who posed as a 19-year-old boy, talking to Sarah Platt (Tina O'Brien), then aged 14, through an internet chatroom. When Sarah starts to talk to strangers on the internet as a way of meeting new people, she talks to a boy called Gary who claims to be 19 years old. Gary and Sarah quickly befriend each other after they share common interests and she becomes smitten by him.

After Gary requests Sarah to call him, she agrees to meet him for the first time. However, when Sarah goes to his house, she is greeted by an older man in his early 30s who claims to be Gary's father which surprises her. The man later confesses to Sarah that he is actually Gary. He justifies to an angry and a disappointed Sarah as being a lonely man who has no close family and friends. Although she rejects him, Sarah empathises with Gary and opens up to him about being a teenage mother to her baby daughter Bethany which causes many problems at home including the separation of her mother Gail (Helen Worth) and adoptive father Martin Platt (Sean Wilson) due to Martin's recent infidelity. Gail and Martin learn about Sarah's arrangement and visits Gary. They both eventually leave after Gary lies to them that he has never seen Sarah whilst Sarah herself hides from them. Gary and Sarah continue their day and he tells her that she is the only girl he has only ever met from chatrooms as he is convinced that they have a special connection.

Sarah begins to worry about Gary's behaviour and his intentions and calls her friend Candice Stowe (Nikki Sanderson) to collect her. However Gary locks her in his bedroom when Candice's boyfriend Todd Grimshaw (Bruno Langley) arrive; Candice and Todd then try to rescue her. A frightened Sarah realises she is in danger with Gary and tries to escape but he refuses to let her leave. Gary confronts Todd who enters into the house after Candice manages to break a back door window, but Todd injures himself on Gary's fireplace. Gail arrives with her neighbour Dennis Stringer (Charles Dale) after calling the police and they save Sarah. Dennis then punches Gary repeatedly and insults him. Gary is then taken into custody by the police but he presses charges against Dennis for assault. The police tell Gail that Gary has been charged with false imprisonment but was promptly released on bail, which disgusts and angers Gail. The following month, the police inform Gail that they wouldn't be pressing any charges against Gary.

== Christie Wells ==
Christie Wells
- Coronation Street character
- Portrayed by: Lauren Drummond
- First appearance: 23 July 2001
- Last appearance: 27 July 2001

Christie Wells, portrayed by Lauren Drummond, was a teenage girl who was supposedly having an affair with sixteen year old Todd Grimshaw (Bruno Langley). Todd had a failed attempt to have an affair with his then girlfriend Candice Stowe's (Nikki Sanderson) best friend Sarah-Louise Platt (Tina O'Brien), so he asked Christie to the disco to get Sarah jealous. However, he seemed to get Christie jealous instead when Christie made jealous remarks at Sarah, causing Sarah to threaten to tell Candice what Todd was trying to do.

== Luke Ashton ==
Luke Ashton
- Coronation Street character
- Portrayed by: John O'Neill
- Duration: 2001–2002
- First appearance: 23 September 2001
- Last appearance: 4 March 2002
- Introduced by: Jane MacNaught
In-universe information
- Mother: Pam Hargreaves
- Half-sisters: Charlie Ramsden; Christine Hargreaves

Luke Ashton, played by John O'Neill, is the much younger half-brother of English Teacher, Charlie Ramsden (Clare McGlinn). Luke was also one of her pupils in her class at Weatherfield Comprehensive School. Luke had absolutely no respect for his teacher and went to lengths such as writing "Mrs Ramsden is an alky" on her whiteboard and graffiting her door, allowing Todd Grimshaw (Bruno Langley) to take the blame. Eventually, Todd's girlfriend, Candice Stowe (Nikki Sanderson) and her friend Sarah Platt (Tina O'Brien) confronted Luke about his behaviour and he eventually owned up. After these events, headteacher Hilary Johnson (Barbara Dryhurst) invited Luke and his mother, Pam Hargreaves (Judi Jones) to a meeting with Charlie and this was when Charlie realised that Luke was her half-brother as Pam had put her up for adoption and recently tried to contact her. After discovering Charlie was his much older estranged half-sister, he was initially hostile, but after being invited to her house for a drink and a chat, the two of them came to an understanding. Charlie even set Luke up with Sarah by putting them both in detention together, which actually worked, but when he found out from Charlie's husband, Matt Ramsden (Stephen Beckett) that she had deliberately put them together, the relationship soured again.

On Christmas Day 2001, Luke caught Todd trying to kiss Sarah and a fight broke out between the two lads. Although Sarah had backed away, the couple broke up by Luke dumping Sarah over text. They subsequently reconciled, but their reunion was only brief as Todd and Candice broke up in March 2002 and Sarah, who had her eyes on Todd, broke up with Luke for good.

== Hilary Johnson ==
Hilary Johnson
- Coronation Street character
- Portrayed by: Barbara Dryhurst
- Duration: 2001–2002
- First appearance: 28 September 2001
- Last appearance: 28 October 2002
- Introduced by: Jane MacNaught
In-universe information
- Occupation: Headteacher

Hilary Johnson, played by Barbara Dryhurst, was the headmistress at Weatherfield Comprehensive School who dealt with many situations between 2001 and 2002. Her first appearance was in September 2001 when English Teacher, Charlie Ramsden (Clare McGlinn) was drinking heavily after many personal problems. These issues were very clear to the pupils and one even chalked "Ramsden is a wino" on her whiteboard and, without any evidence, blamed neighbour Todd Grimshaw (Bruno Langley). His mother, Eileen Grimshaw (Sue Cleaver) was called into a meeting, which resulted in both Grimshaws losing their tempers. As a result, Todd was suspended for five days and Eileen was banned from the school premises. These events made Johnson realise that they may have a teacher with issues on their hands. The whiteboard incident was actually down to Luke Ashton (John O'Neill), who confessed after being pressurised by Todd's girlfriend, Candice Stowe (Nikki Sanderson) and Sarah Platt (Tina O'Brien). They then had a meeting with Luke and his mother, Pam Hargreaves (Judi Jones), who was revealed to be Charlie's biological mother, who put her up for adoption and recently tried to make contact with her.

In April 2002, Charlie's drinking troubles worsened after Charlie's husband, Matt Ramsden (Stephen Beckett) had an affair with Maxine Peacock (Tracy Shaw), resulting in the birth of their son, Joshua Peacock (Benjamin Beresford). After Ken Barlow (William Roache) saw her drinking, he reported her to Johnson, who suspended her. Charlie then resigned, feeling as though she has no choice. Johnson asks Ken to apply for the full-time teacher position, which he did and three weeks later became a Senior Pupil Mentor, offering one-to-one counselling sessions to pupils who needed more support. Johnson also dealt with Aiden Critchley's (Dean Ashton) vendetta against Ken. She made her last appearance when Ken offered her his resignation after punching Aiden in class.

== Ranjiv Alahan ==
Ranjiv Alahan
- Coronation Street character
- Portrayed by: Raad Rawi (2001–2004); Madhav Sharma (2004)
- Duration: 2001, 2004
- First appearance: 3 October 2001
- Last appearance: 25 October 2004
- Introduced by: Jane MacNaught (2001); Kieran Roberts (2004)
In-universe information
- Wife: Urmila Alahan
- Sons: Dev Alahan
- Grandsons: Aadi Alahan
- Granddaughters: Amber Kalirai; Asha Alahan; Shareen

Ranjiv Alahan is the father of Dev Alahan (Jimmi Harkishin) who first appeared in October 2001 and was played by Raad Rawi. Ranjiv first appears when Dev introduces his parents to his fiancée, Geena Gregory (Jennifer James).

The character reappeared in February 2004. Dev's then fiancée Maya Sharma (Sasha Behar), arranges a meeting between her, Dev and Ranjiv in a restaurant in order to introduce herself to Ranjiv, who is impressed with Maya, who works as a lawyer. Ranjiv congratulates his son for his choice of partner. He returned in October 2004, this time played by Madhav Sharma to meet Dev's new fiancée, Sunita Parekh (Shobna Gulati) and subsequently attends their wedding. This is Rajiv's last appearance.

== Urmila Alahan ==
Urmila Alahan
- Coronation Street character
- Portrayed by: Souad Faress (2001); Jamila Massey (2004)
- Duration: 2001, 2004
- First appearance: 3 October 2001
- Last appearance: 25 October 2004
- Introduced by: Jane MacNaught (2001); Kieran Roberts (2004)
In-universe information
- Other names: Urmila Desai
- Occupation: Accountant
- Brothers: Ravi Desai; Raj Desai; Sanjeet Desai
- Husband: Ranjiv Alahan
- Sons: Dev Alahan
- Grandsons: Aadi Alahan
- Granddaughters: Amber Kalirai; Asha Alahan; Shareen
- Nephews: Vikram Desai
- Nieces: Nita Desai

Urmila Alahan (née Desai) is the mother of Dev Alahan (Jimmi Harkishin) who first appeared in October 2001 and was played by Souad Faress. She first appears when Dev introduces his parents to his fiancée, Geena Gregory (Jennifer James). She is also the wife of Ranjiv Alahan (Raad Rawi/Madhav Sharma) and the sister of Ravi Desai (Saeed Jaffrey).

Urmila reappeared in October 2004, this time played by Jamila Massey. This time she meets Dev's new finaceé, Sunita Parekh (Shobna Gulati). She subsequently attends Dev and Sunita's wedding. This is Urmila's last appearance.

== DS Tony Trafford ==
DS Tony Trafford
- Coronation Street character
- Portrayed by: Justin Burrows
- Duration: 2001–2003
- First appearance: 10 October 2001
- Last appearance: 17 January 2003
- Introduced by: Jane MacNaught (2001)

Detective Sergeant Tony Trafford was a local police officer.

Trafford is first seen when Eve Elliott (Melanie Kilburn) reports the disappearance of her daughter Linda Baldwin (Jacqueline Pirie) to the police. Ashley Peacock (Steven Arnold) accompanies Eve to the police station and tells Trafford that he witnessed Linda's husband Mike (Johnny Briggs) hit her. Trafford is initially unconcerned by the report but four days later Linda's car is discovered in a River and Trafford concludes the car was dumped there deliberately and he and his colleagues take the case more seriously, particularly when one of Linda's shoes is discovered in the car. Trafford questions Mike about her disappearance and Mike insists he does not know of her whereabouts and that he had last seen her when she had visited their flat to collect her passport. Linda's brother Ryan (Matthew Dunster) later tells Trafford that he believes Mike killed her as she had had an affair with businessman Harvey Reuben (Andrew Scarborough). Trafford later questions Mike again at the police station and tells him that they know about Linda's affair. Mike's flat is searched and Linda's passport is found and Mike tells Trafford that he had lied about when he had last seen Linda to stop people from gossiping. Trafford then arrests Mike on suspicion of murder. Mike is held overnight and questioned more the following day but Trafford is forced to release him due to a lack of evidence. Trafford later arranges for Mike to take part in an identity parade.

In February 2002, Trafford investigates the death of Duggie Ferguson (John Bowe). He questions Richard (Brian Capron) and Gail Hillman (Helen Worth) who discovered Duggie's body and informs them that they believe Duggie's death was an accident.

Trafford is last seen in January 2003, investigating the murder of Maxine Peacock (Tracy Shaw). Trafford conducts door to door enquiries with the local residents, asking them if they saw anything suspicious. Richard, who is Maxine's killer, implicates Aiden Critchley (Dean Ashton) as a potential suspect. Peter Barlow (Chris Gascoyne) then tells Trafford that he had seen a light in an abandoned hardware shop nearby. Trafford leads a raid on the premises, which it is discovered that Aiden has been using as a squat. Items stolen from the Peacocks' house, planted by Richard, are discovered in Aiden's possession and Trafford arrests Aiden. Trafford is last seen questioning Aiden's ex-girlfriend Sarah-Louise Platt (Tina O'Brien) and she confirms that Aiden had alcohol with him in the squat, backing up his claims that he was too drunk to remember anything. Sarah also tells Trafford that she doesn't believe Aiden is a murderer.

== Ben Watts ==
Ben Watts
- Coronation Street character
- Portrayed by: Stephen Collins
- Duration: 2001–2003
- First appearance: 26 December 2001
- Last appearance: 1 September 2003
- Introduced by: Jane MacNaught (2001)
In-universe information
- Father: Curly Watts
- Mother: Emma Watts
- Half-sisters: Alice Watts
- Grandfathers: Arthur Watts
- Grandmothers: Eunice Watts

Ben Watts, played by Stephen Collins, is the son of Curly Watts (Kevin Kennedy) and Emma Watts (Angela Lonsdale), who was born on Boxing Day 2001; a few weeks premature. He was born at home in No. 7 Coronation Street. The Watts' neighbour, Norris Cole (Malcolm Hebden) found Emma having contractions and called midwives to the scene. As a thank you for Norris' help, they named their baby "Benjamin" as that was Norris' middle name.

Following these actions, Norris remained in touch with the Watts family. One night, Ben continuously cried and Norris managed to get him off to sleep by singing songs to him. This began to be a regular occurrence, so they recorded Norris' voice on a cassette tape to play to Ben if needs be. In 2002, Ben was christened, with Curly's parents, Arthur (Geoff Oldman) and Eunice Watts (Angela Rooks) in attendance. In September 2003, when Ben was nearly two years old, he moved away with his parents to Newcastle.
