= Julie Foy =

English actress and producer

- Born: 5 May 1971 (age 54); Bolton, England
- Occupation(s): Film producer Actress
- Years active: 1986–present
- Notable work: The Silent Child; Coronation Street

Julie Foy (born 5 May 1971) is an English actress and producer, best known for The Silent Child which received critical acclaim and won the Academy Award for Best Live Action Short Film.

== Education ==
Julie Foy attended Canon Slade School in Bolton. Julie started to attend workshops at the Octagon Theatre in Bolton before training at the College of the Performing Arts in Salford. Whilst still at school she made her television debut in Jossy's Giants before going on to appear in Press Gang and on stage in Our Day Out.

== Career ==
Foy appeared in the Granada Television series How To Be Cool and made appearances in Dramarama and Forever Young. In 1988 she played Sally Seddon's sister Gina Seddon in Coronation Street for a year before taking the role of a nurse in the 1989 movie Strapless.

Foy then appeared in BBC's Casualty and onstage at The Birmingham Repertory Company as Ruby in When We Are Married. She later played Jo in A Taste of Honey at the York Theatre Royal. Other television work includes Dawn and the Candidate and as Madge in Missing Persons. In 1996 she returned to the Birmingham Rep to play Marigold in Toad of Toad Hall.

== Filmography ==
| Year | Film | Role | Director |
|---|---|---|---|
| 2019 | The Betrayal of Maria Sivan | Producer | Nicholas Connor |
| 2017 | The Silent Child | Producer | Chris Overton |
| 1993 | Casualty | Sue | George Case |
| 1990 | Missing Persons | Madge | Derek Bennet |
| 1990 | Press Gang | Ruby | Various |
| 1989 | Strapless | Nurse | David Hare |
| 1988–1989 | Coronation Street | Gina Seddon | Various |
| 1988 | How to be Cool | Deidre | Various |
| 1988 | Dramarama | Tina | Gareth Morgan |
| 1986–1987 | Jossy's Giants | Tracey | George Case |

== Awards and nominations ==
The Silent Child won best short film at the Rhode Island International Film Festival in August 2017. This made it eligible for entry to the Oscars. In December 2017 the film was selected as one of the final ten films in the Live Action Short Film category for the 90th Academy Awards. On 23 January 2018, it was announced that The Silent Child was nominated for the Academy Award for Best Live Action Short Film for the 90th Academy Awards, which it then won.

| Award | Date of ceremony | Category | Result |
|---|---|---|---|
| Academy Awards | March 4, 2018 | Live Action Short Film | Won |
