= Louise Harrison =

British actress

Louise Harrison (born Louise Anna Imogen Harrison) in Bowdon, Cheshire, is a British actress who attended prep schools in Cheshire and the independent boarding school Woldingham, in Surrey, before training at the Royal Welsh College of Music and Drama. She has British and EU citizenship due to her half French half Dutch mother . She is best known for her role as PC Donna Harris in the long running ITV drama The Bill and Dawn Prescott in Coronation Street. She has also appeared in various other TV dramas and on stage.

Harrison was married to John Eastwood from 2002 until his death in 2022.

== Acting career ==
Her first role was in the series A Very Peculiar Practice, where she played Suzanne. Shortly after she went on to play her first regular role as Dawn Prescott in Coronation Street and then a couple of years later joined the cast of The Bill as PC Donna Harris who she played for five years. She has appeared in other television dramas, and on stage including at the Royal Exchange Theatre, Manchester.

In 2020, Louise Harrison discussed her life and career during an in-depth interview for The Bill Podcast
