= Kevin Webster =

Fictional character from Coronation Street

- Coronation Street character
- Portrayed by: Michael Le Vell
- Duration: 1983–present
- First appearance: 19 October 1983
- Introduced by: Mervyn Watson
- Book appearances: Coronation Street: The Complete Saga; Coronation Street: Life In The Street
- Crossover appearances: Corriedale (2026)
In-universe information
- Occupation: Businessman; Mechanic
- Father: Bill Webster
- Mother: Alison Webster
- Stepmother: Elaine Prior; Maureen Holdsworth
- Sisters: Debbie Webster
- Wife: Sally Seddon (1986–1999, 2002–2012); Alison Wakefield (2000); Abi Franklin (2021–present)
- Sons: Jake Webster; Jack Webster
- Daughters: Rosie Webster; Sophie Webster
- Adoptive sons: Alfie Franklin
- Nephews: Carl Webster

Kevin Webster is a fictional character from the British ITV soap opera Coronation Street, portrayed by Michael Le Vell since 1983. A mechanic by trade, Kevin is one of the programme's longest-serving characters and is best known for his long-running relationship with Sally Webster (Sally Dynevor).

Kevin is the father of Rosie (Emma Collinge, Helen Flanagan) and Sophie (Ashleigh Middleton, Emma Woodward, Brooke Vincent), his daughters with Sally. His major storylines centre on his on-and-off relationship with Sally, which spans two marriages: the first ends after his affair with neighbour Natalie Barnes (Denise Welch), and the second after a long affair with Molly Dobbs (Vicky Binns), whose son Jack (Kyran Bowes) he fathers before Molly dies in a tram crash during the show's 50th-anniversary live episode. Other storylines include a brief marriage to Alison Wakefield (Naomi Radcliffe); relationships with Jenny Bradley (Sally Ann Matthews) and Anna Windass (Debbie Rush); a feud with Pat Phelan (Connor McIntyre); caring for Jack through sepsis that leads to a foot amputation; marriage to Abi Franklin (Sally Carman); and a testicular cancer diagnosis.

== Creation ==
=== Casting ===
Actor Michael Le Vell auditioned for the role and landed the part after he had played another character called Neil Grimshaw, a newspaper delivery boy who worked at The Kabin.

Kevin Webster as he appeared in 1983.

=== Characterisation ===
Kevin is a family man and looks out for his family. ITV publicity describes the character: "A no-nonsense garage mechanic who likes an uncomplicated life and his tea on the table when he comes home from work." In the book Life in the Street by Graeme Kay, Kevin is described as a "very cheerful yet cautious" character.

== Development ==
=== Relationship with Sally Webster ===
The characters of Kevin and Sally had a lack of storylines in their first years on the show, but received a boost when Brian Park became the executive producer. The Independent reports him as saying, "Kevin and Sally Webster had years of washing their hands and eating baked beans on toast. Michael Le Vell and Sally Dynevor (then Whittaker) were then given great storylines, including his affair with Natalie, Sally's catfight with her when she found out, and the subsequent divorce".

=== Temporary departures ===
In February 2013, Michael Le Vell was accused of sexual assault allegations and Kevin was written out of the series, with his absence explained by his being in Germany, caring for his father, Bill. Le Vell was found not guilty in September of the same year and entered talks to return. Kevin returned briefly in March 2014, thirteen months since his last appearance, before taking another temporary break from the show after it was revealed that Le Vell had taken cocaine during his absence.

== Storylines ==
Kevin arrives in Weatherfield in 1983 and becomes a mechanic at Brian Tilsley's (Christopher Quinten) garage. His father Bill (Peter Armitage) and sister Debbie (Sue Devaney) join him before moving to Southampton in 1985; Kevin stays and lodges with Hilda Ogden (Jean Alexander). In 1986 he meets Sally Seddon (Sally Dynevor), and they marry that October after he rescues Bet Lynch (Julie Goodyear) from a fire. The couple buy Hilda's house in 1987, and Kevin buys the garage in 1996. They have two daughters, Rosie (Helen Flanagan) and Sophie (Brooke Vincent).

Kevin has an affair with Natalie Horrocks (Denise Welch), the mother of his business partner, and he and Sally divorce in 1999 after Sally has her own affair with Greg Kelly (Stephen Billington). Kevin marries Alison Wakefield (Naomi Radcliffe) in 2000, but their newborn son Jake dies of a Group B streptococcal infection; a grief-stricken Alison abducts a neighbour's baby and takes her own life. Kevin and Sally reconcile and remarry in December 2002.

At the garage, Kevin mentors Tyrone Dobbs (Alan Halsall) and is drawn into several conflicts. He discovers the body of murdered employee Tommy Harris (Thomas Craig) in 2005, and is briefly imprisoned after assaulting teacher John Stape (Graeme Hawley), who had an affair with the teenage Rosie. When businessman Tony Gordon (Gray O'Brien) tries to take over the garage, Kevin gives Tyrone a half share to retain control.

In 2009 Kevin begins an affair with Tyrone's wife, Molly Dobbs (Vicky Binns). He ends it when Sally is diagnosed with breast cancer, unaware that Molly is pregnant. During the programme's 50th-anniversary live episode in December 2010, a tram crash kills Molly, who reveals as she dies that Kevin is the father of her son, Jack (Kyran Bowes). The disclosure ends Kevin's marriage and his friendship with Tyrone, and he raises Jack alone. A long divorce follows, during which Kevin wins £200,000 on a scratchcard and eventually gives the money to Sally.

Kevin is written out in 2013, his absence explained as caring for the ailing Bill, and returns in 2014. He has a relationship with Jenny Bradley (Sally Ann Matthews) in 2015 that ends when she abducts Jack and is sectioned. After expanding the garage, Kevin begins a relationship with neighbour Anna Windass (Debbie Rush), which brings him into conflict with Pat Phelan (Connor McIntyre); Anna leaves Weatherfield in 2018 after stabbing Phelan. Later that year, Jack develops sepsis that requires a foot amputation. Kevin later marries Abi Franklin (Sally Carman) and is diagnosed with testicular cancer.

== Reception ==
Le Vell was nominated for the 2011 British Soap Award for "Best Actor". Daniel Kilkelly from Digital Spy put the scene where Kevin "forgets" that he has a deceased son (where he says that "it must be hard burying one of your kids") on his list of 11 "blunders" in soap operas, calling it "a humiliating script error" that viewers immediately noticed.
