= Sally Webster =

Fictional character from Coronation Street

- Coronation Street character
- Portrayed by: Sally Dynevor
- Duration: 1986–present
- First appearance: 27 January 1986
- Introduced by: John G. Temple
- Spin-off appearances: Coronation Street: Text Santa Special (2013–2014)
In-universe information
- Other names: Sally Seddon; Sally Metcalfe
- Occupation: Machinist; Personal assistant; Factory supervisor; Barmaid; Shop assistant; Councillor; Mayor of Weatherfield
- Father: Eddie Seddon
- Mother: Elsie Seddon
- Sisters: Gina Seddon
- Husband: Kevin Webster (1986–1999, 2002–2012); Tim Metcalfe (2015; void, 2020–present) (Note: Tim and Sally initially married in 2015, but it was discovered in 2019 that he was still married to Charlie Wood, thus making his marriage to Sally invalid. Sally and Tim later married in 2020 after his divorce from Charlie.)
- Daughters: Rosie Webster; Sophie Webster
- Adoptive sons: Brody Michaelis (foster)
- Adoptive daughters: Joanie Michaelis (foster); Shanice Michaelis (foster)
- Stepsons: Jack Webster
- Stepdaughters: Faye Windass
- Uncles: Tom Hopwood
- Aunts: Velda Seddon; Bertha Croston; May Hopwood
- First cousins: Paul Seddon
- Other relatives: Nicolette Seddon

Sally Webster (also Seddon and Metcalfe) is a fictional character from the British ITV soap opera Coronation Street, portrayed by Sally Dynevor. The character first appeared on-screen during the episode airing on 27 January 1986, when Kevin Webster (Michael Le Vell) drove past her in his van and accidentally splashed her while she was waiting for a bus. Her notable storylines have seen her married twice to Kevin, becoming the victim of domestic violence by Greg Kelly (Stephen Billington) and her attempts to become the pillar of the community and annoy Janice Battersby (Vicky Entwistle) in the process. During her time on the soap, she has also tried to impress her bosses Bet Lynch (Julie Goodyear), Alf Roberts (Bryan Mosley), Mike Baldwin (Johnny Briggs), Paul Connor (Sean Gallagher) and Carla Connor (Alison King) and gain promotions. In 2009, Sally was diagnosed with Breast cancer; whilst portraying the storyline, Dynevor herself found out that she also had breast cancer, and claimed that the storyline had potentially saved her life. Following a second divorce from Kevin, the character embarks on a relationship with Tim Metcalfe (Joe Duttine) and goes on to marry him in 2020, survives a minibus crash, begins a political career on the local council and later progresses to become the Mayor, becomes the victim of an internet troll, is wrongfully imprisoned for fraud and is injured when the roof collapses at the factory.

== Creation ==
=== Casting ===
Auditions were held for the part of Sally Seddon with actress Sally Whittaker (Dynevor, since 1995) securing the role. Dynevor had previously auditioned twice for two different Coronation Street characters. The first was the milkman's eldest daughter, and the second a girlfriend of Kevin Webster (Michael Le Vell). She got neither role, the latter because the girlfriend was meant to be posh. Interviewed for The People's Soap Special, Dynevor spoke about how terrifying her first episode was to film because she had not done any TV work prior to the role and the scene involved one of the show's best known characters, Hilda Ogden (Jean Alexander).

=== Characterisation ===
Sally is described as ambitious, sometimes even arrogant, and is considered by various Street residents (Janice Battersby in particular) to be quite snobby. Such behaviour is apparent in her attempts to live above her station. In the past she has pressured her family to do much of what she tells them. She tried to force her daughter Rosie into a prestigious school; Rosie did not want to go. Another event saw her become envious of a friend's large house. Once, in fear of being constantly regarded by her daughters as the "bad guy", Sally would intentionally act passive and forgiving whenever the girls acted up, making Kevin out to be the mean, unfair parent when he scolded them for their behaviour. Kevin eventually got his revenge when he and the girls trashed their house while Sally was out. When she returned home and saw the mess, she couldn't keep up her act and became angry, feeling as though her role in the family was unimportant. Kevin told her otherwise, declaring that she always keeps the family in order and on their toes, and that she is genuinely appreciated by all.

In a 2008 interview with newspaper The People, Sally Dynevor expressed her delight with Sally's ever evolving personality: "After more than 20 years, I still get the same pang of excitement over a good script as I did when I first joined the show. Sally meddles in everyone else's business and thinks she is so much better than the rest of them but really she is just the same. There aren't many dull moments. Sally is a fabulous character and I know I am so lucky to play her. All those years ago when I started she wasn't like this so I am so pleased that the producers have made her change. It has only been over the last five years that she has turned into a right cow. That is brilliant because it means I can show what I can do as an actress. I know some viewers hate her, others love her, but I am pleased she is talked about. I hope she carries on being like this for a very long time to come."

In an interview with Woman magazine in 2015, Dynevor praised soap writers for reinventing Sally. She said: "After 29 years in Coronation Street, I feel like I'm 'reinventing' Sally a little bit and I really like that. I've had to change with the times, otherwise I'd have been left behind. I'm getting a lot more comedy now, and Joe Duttine [Tim] and I can't stop laughing – which is great. He's so funny and we work well together." In 2017, Dynevor noted the similarities between herself and the character, commenting, "I'm getting so like her, it's awful. I'm morphing into her". The actress noted that others would laugh due to her and the character both having husbands named Tim. Dynevor also revealed that she does not like Sally's clothes, saying "I go to a photoshoot and there's anything resembling Sally, I want to cry." The actress also praised the soap for having a female producer and refocussing the storylines on the female characters in the soaps, and said that she had been able to portray Sally in "a more three-dimensional way and show her vulnerability".

== Development ==
=== Relationship with Kevin Webster ===
Shortly after Sally's arrival in 1986 she was paired with Kevin Webster portrayed by Michael Le Vell and they then went on to get married and have two daughters Rosie and Sophie. Their marriage was on and off a number of times mainly due to either one of them having an affair. In 2009, Kevin went on to have an affair with Molly Dobbs (Vicky Binns) resulting in Kevin getting Molly pregnant and her giving birth to a baby boy named Jack. Kevin revealed all to Sally in the Christmas Day 2009 episode; where Sally ended the marriage. In 2011, Le Vell backed a Sally and Kevin reunion stating; "I think they could definitely get back together, but I don't know when or how they could make it work as long as Sally accepts baby Jack." Dynevor added: "So many people have said it just wouldn't be right if Sally and Kevin weren't together. But I'm sure it would be really difficult for her to accept Jack as her own. Could you do that?"

In 2015, Sally was involved in a surprise kiss with Kevin whilst being in a relationship and engaged to Kevin's best friend Tim Metcalfe (Joe Duttine). Asked if Kevin has feelings for Sally, Le Vell replied: "He'll always have feelings for her, as they were together for a long time. He'll always love her, but they just hurt each other too many times and too much water has passed under the bridge. Never say never but I think Sally and Tim are a great couple and Kevin enjoys seeing them together as well. They've got that harmonious relationship where he's still got Sally and Sophie in his life and he's got a new best mate in Tim." Asked about Kevin's reaction to the kiss Le Vell replied: "He's in total shock and disbelief. After about five seconds, that is when the realisation sinks in. He does respond at first but then he realises this is wrong. He is genuinely shocked. He knows deep down Sally didn't mean it, it is just a spur of the moment thing. Sally and Kevin do both feel genuinely bad afterwards for Tim because it was something and nothing. Obviously you wouldn't like it if your real life partner did it, but it didn't mean anything and they were married for over 20 years, not that that makes it okay! They're both full of remorse, even though it's not really Kevin's fault, Sally does pounce on him but he still feels guilty."

=== Breast cancer ===
In September 2009, it was revealed that Sally would fall victim to breast cancer. Speaking of the plot, Dynevor said, "I do know women who have suffered or are suffering from breast cancer. For the last year, I have been fund-raising for breast cancer charities and am a long-standing patron for The Genesis Appeal. So, when I was told about this storyline I was determined to do it justice for all the women out there who are going through what Sally is. A few years ago, I found a lump and was sent to get it checked out straight away. I was lucky that it proved to be nothing but the time spent waiting to find out the results was agonising." A Coronation Street spokesman added, "Breast cancer is a disease which affects so many women and their families. We are keen to ensure that the storyline accurately reflects the many problems and issues faced by breast cancer sufferers."

In May 2010 it was revealed that at the same time as her character found out that she had cancer, Dynevor herself discovered that hours after filming Sally's cancer revealing scenes, she was also suffering from the disease. Dynevor explained that she found a lump in her breast while preparing for a storyline in which her character Sally Webster has the disease: "If I had not been researching this storyline I may not have discovered the lump in my breast and had it looked at so quickly, as a result of the early diagnosis, my treatment has been successful and I am able to return to work next month. This storyline could very well have saved my life."

=== Relationship with Tim Metcalfe ===
In 2013, Sally began a relationship with Tim Metcalfe portrayed by Joe Duttine. Dynevor revealed that even though Sally likes Tim she would like him to make some improvements to his lifestyle and commented on ITV Daybreak; "He's a bit of a commitment-phobe so I'm not sure [what will happen], but he's nice and Sally really likes him. She's trying to change him – manipulate him into what she wants! But he's not having it and he wants to go off down the pub, and doesn't want to spend any romantic weekends with her or anything. He's a real bloke – he wants his tea on the table!"

Dynevor admitted; "I didn't really want Sally to find someone at first, but I like this relationship because she's not found 'Mr Perfect'. All the other men Sally's been with, I could easily have seen her having long term relationships with them. With Tim, you know there's no way they're going to live happily ever after, they're going to drive each other insane. I like the drama that has to offer."

In 2015, it was revealed that Tim would propose to Sally. Asked how Sally feels about Tim, Dynevor said: "I think she really loves Tim and she really cares for him but she's hoping she's going to be able to change him into the man she's always wanted to be with." Asked how Sally reacts to the proposal Dunevor said: "It does come out of the blue to Sally. They have spoken about getting married in the past then decided they were happy just to be living together, so it does come as a shock. But I think the fact that he gets down on one knee, he's got the music, he's bought the ring and he does it in front of everybody does mean Sally's thrilled."

=== Politics ===
In December 2015, it was revealed that producers were lining up a plot which would see Sally team up with her neighbours in a bid to tackle several issues in the area. Sally Dynevor, told Inside Soap: "There is no sign of Sally's ambition waning – she is going to be taking on local politics in 2016. Tim isn't bothered at all. He just stands behind her, raising eyebrows. But it's a great storyline – we've already started filming it and it has been really fun. Sally has Ken, Norris and Mary on board with her – so I reckon she is going to do quite well!" Backing the storyline, Dynevor admitted that she is delighted with the direction Sally is going in at the moment. It has been great to have such lovely feedback from everyone," she said. "The scriptwriters are writing so much comedy for Sally right now and I love it – long may it continue." In 2017, Sally again gets involved in politics and decides to run for mayor. Dynevor revealed that she would not vote for Sally in real life due to the character's politics being too similar to those of Conservatives Theresa May and Margaret Thatcher.

== Storylines ==
Kevin Webster's van goes through a puddle and splashes pedestrian Sally Seddon, making her furious as she's on her way to a job interview. He takes her back to his house to dry off. Hilda Ogden (Jean Alexander) has heard of the Seddons and shows her dislike of her. Kevin goes on a date with Sally. Kevin is annoyed when Hilda keeps on about how unsuitable Sally is compared to Michelle Robinson. Kevin takes Sally to tea at No.13 so Hilda can get to know her. When Sally makes an insulting comment about Eddie Yeats (Geoffrey Hughes), they are soon shouting at each other. Hilda asks Terry Duckworth (Nigel Pivaro) and Curly Watts (Kevin Kennedy) to try to get Kevin away from Sally by taking him on a lads' night out. Kevin introduces Sally to the lads, who think she's fantastic. Hilda does her best to stop Kevin from seeing Sally. Sally tells Hilda that she has no right to be so protective of Kevin as she's not his mother. Kevin gets annoyed when Sally keeps standing him up and missing dates. Hilda tells Kevin that she's seen Sally with a man. He is distraught, accuses Hilda of lying and slams out of the house. Sally confesses that she was out with another lad; it was Alex, her ex-boyfriend. She saw him to make sure that he knew that they were finished. Kevin feels a bit better. Hilda fears that Kevin is gone for good. Hilda is pleased when Kevin returns. He apologises about his behaviour. She doesn't mind but is annoyed to find that he's still seeing Sally.

Terry takes Sally on to run the office at the Builder's Yard at £1 an hour. Curly thinks that it's a bad move. Sally decides to continue claiming the dole despite having this new job. Kevin doesn't like the idea of Sally working with Terry. Curly has nobody to take to Susan Barlow (Wendy Jane Walker)'s twenty-first so Sally offers to set him up with her friend Lois Fairhurst. Kevin doesn't like the way Sally flirts with Terry. Sally is thrilled when Terry kisses her. Kevin is furious when Terry tells him that Sally is fair game. Kevin warns him to keep his hands off her. Sally enjoys canoodling with Terry in the Yard whilst continuing to see Kevin. Curly is upset at the way Terry is mucking around with Sally. He asks Terry to lay off but Terry laughs it off, threatening to thump him if he doesn't keep his mouth shut. Kevin calls at the Yard and finds Sally and Terry together. He goes for Terry, hitting him. They fight in the Yard. Terry sports a black eye, having come out of the fight worse. Sally refuses to take the blame for the fight; it's not her fault if lads get jealous over her. Kevin is upset that he's finished with Sally and upset that he couldn't trust his friends. Terry tires of hearing people talking about Kevin giving him a pasting. He rows with him, wanting another fight but Hilda stops them and lectures them on the value of friendship. Sally begins to find Terry a bit ignorant. Sally tells Kevin that she's sorry she went out with Terry. She tells him she wants to go out with him and she swears that she is serious about him. Kevin is pleased. Kevin is set upon by Terry and Sally to hold a party at No.13. Sally tells Kevin that she's going to spend the night with him. Sally has spent the night with Kevin at No.13. Sally is upset when her mother throws her out after discovering that she spent the night with a man. Kevin takes her in. With Hilda returning, Sally clears her things out of No.13. Hilda returns from Torquay. Kevin explains that Sally is homeless. Hilda is forced to let Sally stay when Kevin threatens to leave and walk the streets with Sally. Hilda learns that Sally has been staying at No.13 during her absence.

Hilda tells Kevin that Sally must leave, immediately; they've misused her house. Elsie Seddon (Brenda Elder) tracks Sally down and demands she hand over her dole money so she can buy husband Eddie (James Duggan) beer. Hilda witnesses this and is shocked that the Seddons care so little for Sally. Hilda tells Sally she can stay until she finds somewhere else to live; she doesn't want Sally to have to live with her father. Hilda doesn't like leaving Sally and Kevin alone at No.13 and monitors their every move. Hilda refuses to accept housekeeping money from Sally, feeling it would bind her legally. Kevin tells Sally he wants to move into a flat with her – she is delighted. Hilda is mortified at the thought of Kevin and Sally living together. Kevin and Sally go to Sheffield for an all-night pop concert. Kevin and Sally return at 5.30 am from Sheffield. They spot smoke coming out of the Rovers' door. Sally wakes the residents whilst Kevin tries to wake Bet. Hilda knows Sally and Kevin are spending their nights together. Hilda lays a trap for Sally on the stairs. She forgets about it and falls down the stairs herself. Sally and Kevin marry in 1986 and buy No.13 from Hilda when she leaves the area to become housekeeper to Dr. Lowther in Derbyshire.

In 1990, Sally gets pregnant and gives birth to a baby girl in the back of Don Brennan's (Geoffrey Hinsliff) taxi on Christmas Eve. She names the baby Rosie (Emma Collinge, Helen Flanagan) because the taxi is parked on Rosamund Street. Sally falls pregnant again in 1994 and "Lauren" (Ashleigh Middleton, Emma Woodward, Brooke Vincent) is born in early November. The name "Lauren" does not last as Rosie always calls her younger sister Sophie, so she and Kevin change her name to Sophie. Sally also decides to go back to work, getting a job at Mike Baldwin's (Johnny Briggs) factory in 1996.

Sally's mother has a stroke in 1997 and Sally goes to Scarborough to look after her. This makes Kevin feel neglected and begins an affair with his business partner, Natalie Horrocks (Denise Welch). When Sally returns to Weatherfield, she knows that something is wrong, and eventually catches Kevin and Natalie in bed together. Sally throws Kevin out and he moves in with Natalie. Angry, Sally gets mechanic Chris Collins (Matthew Marsden) to let her into Natalie's house and promptly floods it. Natalie threatens Sally with legal action, causing them to fight in the Street.

Sally has a brief fling with Chris Collins but eventually forgives Kevin and by Christmas 1997, the Websters are reunited. In 1998, she has an affair with Greg Kelly (Stephen Billington). Kevin finds out and he throws Sally out so she moves in with Greg and they agree on a separation, but not custody of the girls. Greg hits Sally after an argument and she leaves him, asking Kevin to take the girls as Rita Sullivan (Barbara Knox) does not have room for all of them but when she rents number 6, Kevin refuses to let the girls move in with her. So she takes him to court for custody and wins. Kevin, however, takes this badly and disappears, returning six weeks later, having had a breakdown.

On the eve of Kevin's wedding to Alison Wakefield (Naomi Radcliffe), Sally sleeps with Kevin. In 2001, the couple plan to wed, but Kevin becomes more and more jealous. He vanishes, making Sally worry about his whereabouts. Kevin turns up at Sally's hen night and says that he still loves her. Sally later confesses to her ex-fiancé, Danny Hargreaves (Richard Standing), that she and Kevin slept together on the eve of his wedding to Alison, and Danny leaves her and the Street. In 2002, Sally suggests to Kevin that he move back into Number 13 and they remarry later that year.

Sally, looking for something challenging in the employment stakes, takes a job as a personal assistant to prosperous garage owner, Ian Davenport (Philip Bretherton). They met at a local private school, Oakhill, as Rosie is friends with Ian's daughter. Unfortunately, she takes the fling more seriously than him as he sees her simply as one in a long succession of women. When he finishes with her, she is bitter and resentful as she risked her family for a fling and it stings even more because Kevin knows Sally was unfaithful but is willing to overlook it. Sally turns her ambitions to her daughter, Rosie. When Rosie shows an interest in being a pop star, Sally pushes her onto the stage where she is miserable. In a particularly humorous event, Sally is indignant when Ken Barlow (William Roache) misspells Rosie's name in a review of her school show. She is unhappy about Rosie dating Craig Harris (Richard Fleeshman), a local lad whose family has a past, (too much like her own). When she learns that they are sleeping together, she drags to Rosie to the doctor and is disappointed that he praises Rosie for being sensible enough to take precautions. Sally's emotions and nerves crumble as she takes Rosie on a wild drive across the M62 en route to a boarding school but loses control of the car, almost killing them both. Kevin catches up and cradles his wife, who admits she is disappointed with life in a back street, saying she just wanted more for her children than she had.

In 2007, Sally decides to take an A-Level in English literature and has private lessons with John Stape (Graeme Hawley). Sally becomes obsessed with John, making Fiz Brown (Jennie McAlpine) (John's girlfriend) jealous. This leads to a misunderstanding when Sally gets something in her eye and John tries to remove it just as Fiz and Sean Tully (Antony Cotton) enter the factory. As they are standing so close together, Fiz thinks that they are kissing and slaps Sally. Fiz is right about Sally's feelings for John and Sally eventually tells John how she feels but he lets her down gently, as he is having an affair with Rosie instead. This is revealed on Christmas Day that year when John accidentally gives Fiz and Rosie the wrong presents.

In 2008 the Websters swap houses with the Peacocks who are having financial difficulties and move into Number 4. Following the move, Sally becomes extremely house-proud, frequently boasting about the house's conservatory and size compared to other houses on the street.

In 2009, Kevin develops feelings for Molly Dobbs (Vicky Binns), wife of his employee/friend, Tyrone (Alan Halsall). Molly takes an interest in the business and shares the bookkeeping with Sally, spending more time with Kevin. Eventually, he tells Molly how he feels. Molly is initially horrified but later tells him that she is flattered and they begin an affair, first sleeping together when Kevin sneaks away from Sally's birthday party. Afterwards, Kevin feels guilty and decides to end it before it gets out of hand by persuading Tyrone to take Molly on holiday. They resume the affair in August, agreeing to tell their respective spouses and leave them but Kevin ends things with Molly instead, after learning that Sally has breast cancer. After breaking the difficult news to Rosie and Sophie, Sally has a lumpectomy to remove the growth, which proves successful. She visits her sister while recovering from her treatment, returning in July, celebrating her birthday with her family.

In December 2010, Molly admits her affair with Kevin and that he is the father of her son, Jack, named after Jack Duckworth (William Tarmey) by Tyrone. Just after shocking Sally with this revelation, she dies. Sally confronts Kevin and orders him to tell Tyrone and leave. Sally tells Rita and she suggests she move on. Later, Kevin tries to win her back but she's not interested and Rosie and Sophie agree, telling him to leave for good. Sally states seeing him with Jack makes her hate him even more and wants to be rid of them both. After a desperate plea from Sophie, Sally allows him to stay for Christmas Day but on New Year's Eve, Kevin accepts he's not wanted and baby Jack is Tyrone's son and leaves alone. However, Tyrone is equally devastated when he learns about Kevin and Molly's affair and unable to look at Jack now, he gives Jack to Kevin. Sally kisses Tyrone just after the New Year but nothing happens. Although she lies to Kevin, telling him that she wanted to hurt him as he hurt her when he had the affair. This leads to Kevin and Tyrone fighting and Kevin decides to sell the house & freezes all joint bank accounts. Sally tells Kevin that she lied to him about sleeping with Tyrone and they agree to a truce but when Kevin suggests giving their marriage another go and starting a new family, Sally is adamant that she will not have him back.

After being fired by Underworld boss Carla Connor (Alison King) because of the company's financial difficulties, Sally complains to Carla's ex-business partner/former fiancé, Frank Foster (Andrew Lancel), who employs her and promotes her to line supervisor. At the same time, her relationship with Rosie's agent, Jeff, ends after the Weatherfield Gazette publish a story detailing Sally's cancer, Kevin's infidelity, baby Jack and Sophie's sexuality – information provided by Jeff. Sally soon finds herself drawn to Frank and makes it clear that she does not believe Carla's claims that he raped her and the pair form a mutual attraction for one another. However, on 2 March 2012, Sally sees Frank's true colours when his mother tells Sally that Frank does not love her and is having an affair with Jenny Sumner (Niky Wardley). A shocked Sally confronted Frank and he admits the affair and that he did rape Carla, warning her not to cross him as the last woman who did 'lived to regret it'. Sally is devastated by this and Kevin offers her support, threatening to murder Frank and then on 5 March, Sally finds Frank dead in the factory. She is found standing over him with blood on her hands but did not kill him as he was bludgeoned to death with a whiskey bottle. However, due to recent events, Sally is a suspect but she attends his funeral and is puzzled when Anne (Gwen Taylor), Frank's mother, leaves the crematorium, during the service and visits her. Sally finds Anne holding Frank's missing watch, which was missing from his personal possessions on the day he died and she admits having it all along and Sally realises that Anne killed Frank in a fit of rage as she heard him admitting to Carla that he did rape her. A horrified Sally then tries to leave but falls on the stairs, hitting her head on the wooden banister, knocking her unconscious. As Carla and Kevin arrived, an ambulance is called and Anne is arrested. Sally and Kevin begin to rekindle their romance and relationship as Sally realises that she still loves Kevin and he has stood by her regardless. Unfortunately though Sally cannot accept Jack.

With Kevin away in Germany, Sally begins a relationship with Tim Metcalfe. At first, Tim is put off by Sally planning to book a holiday to France and lies that he has to leave for work reasons. When Tim returns, he prepares to break up with Sally but later reconsiders when he realises he has feelings for her. However, Tim is later unimpressed when Sally leaves his daughter Faye by herself, although Faye and her friend Grace lied about the amount of time Sally left them on their own for.

Tim and Sally later get engaged however she kisses Kevin and he finds out. Sally, presumably having a breakdown of some sort still goes to the wedding and Tim eventually turns up after Kevin talked him round. They then married happily in front of the guests.

In 2017, Sally receives a call from the hospital saying her cancer is back. However, Rosie and Sophie learn that it was a malicious prank call from a person on social media.

In 2022, Sally is featured in the local newspaper for urinating in Victoria Gardens on New Years Eve. She is arrested during Tim’s heart operation.

== Reception ==
Dynevor was nominated in the category of "Best Actress" at The British Soap Awards 2011. She won "Best Comedy Performance" at The British Soap Awards 2015.

In February 2006, the storyline involving Sally driving Rosie to a moor and scolding her for her unruly behaviour came under criticism from Winnie Johnson, the mother of Moors Murders victim Keith Bennett due to the scenes being filmed at Saddleworth Moor where her son's body is thought to be buried. Winnie Johnson criticised the storyline stating, "This is outrageous and plain disgusting. Are they going out of their way to be sick? I lost my son out on those moors but to film a child abduction up there after everything that has happened is a disgrace." A Coronation Street spokesman defended the storyline.

Low Culture columnist Ruth Deller praised Sally Dynevor's work on the show during 2010: "It's all too easy to overlook long-term characters as being worthy of praise, but since Sally Dynevor returned to the Street this year, she has been on fire. Name checking Mary Queen of Scots, dishing out incredible one-liners, being the stand-out performer in the live episodes and handling the Sophie/Sian and Kevin/Molly situations perfectly, both actress and character have cemented their place in our collective hearts. People like Sally tend to miss out on soap awards and suchlike because they’re always there, but maybe, just maybe her recent work will be noticed and she’ll get some acknowledgement in the next lot of gongs."

A columnist writing for TV Buzz said that Sally does not "give a damn" about what people think of her, because if she did she would have "fled Weatherfield a long time ago". They said that during her storyline with Frank, Sally took her "Miss Independent act a step too far" by romancing him. A reporter for the Western Mail branded Sally "Ms Holier-than-Thou" and said "It's a tribute to Sally Dynevor's acting skills that she makes many of us want to reach through the TV, give her a good shake and yell: "Listen to Carla and Maria!"

In 2017, David Brown from Radio Times called Sally a "stalwart" and a "mainstay" of the soap.
