= Michael Le Vell =

English actor (born 1964)

- Born: Michael Robert Turner; 15 December 1964 (age 61); Newton Heath, Manchester, England
- Occupation: Actor
- Years active: 1981–present
- Employers: ITV (1981–present); BBC (former)
- Known for: Role of Kevin Webster in Coronation Street
- Spouse: Janette Beverley (m. 1986; sep. 2011) Louise Gibbons (m. 2026)
- Children: 2

Michael Robert Turner (born 15 December 1964), known professionally as Michael Le Vell, is an English actor. He is best known for his role as mechanic Kevin Webster in the long-running ITV soap opera Coronation Street, a role he has played since 1983.

== Early life ==
Le Vell was born in Newton Heath, Manchester. When he was fifteen, his mother died from a brain tumour, and when he was 22, his father died of lung cancer. He has a brother, Phil, and two sisters.

== Career ==
Le Vell began his acting career in the Oldham Theatre Workshop after taking an interest in amateur dramatics while at school. He had a guest role as paperboy Neil Grimshaw in Coronation Street. He then went on to appear in the BBC shows Fame is the Spur and One by One.

Le Vell later attended an audition at Granada Studios for the series Scully, where he met casting director Judy Hayfield. Hayfield presumed that he was present to audition for Coronation Street, and asked him to return the following day to try out for a part. Le Vell was then offered the role of Kevin Webster.

During the 1980s, Le Vell gained status as a gay icon because he wore tight jeans and had a moustache. Le Vell received a high volume of fan mail from gay fans. He later stated that his gay following diminished after he shaved off his moustache. Twenty-six years into playing Kevin, Le Vell said he would continue in the role because he still viewed it as "the best job on television".

== Personal life ==
Le Vell lives in Hale, Greater Manchester. He married actress Janette Beverley in October 1986, after she had featured alongside him in Coronation Street. They have two children together. In 2011, Le Vell and Beverley separated after 25 years together due to becoming estranged.

Le Vell was a member of the celebrity football team All Stars, who play for charities. In 2007, he was hospitalised during a match. He was a director of Ratio Money, which went into administration on 12 April 2010. This business attempted to exploit a loophole in the Consumer Credit Act to allow people to avoid credit card debts.

=== Sexual offences allegations and trial ===
In September 2011, Le Vell was arrested on suspicion of rape, which he denied. In January 2012, the Crown Prosecution Service dropped the case, citing insufficient evidence. On 14 February 2013, Alison Levitt QC, principal legal adviser to the Director of Public Prosecutions, stated that she had reviewed a decision not to prosecute Turner following allegations made against him in 2011. She authorised Greater Manchester Police to charge him with 19 offences.

ITV announced that he would not be appearing in Coronation Street "pending the outcome of legal proceedings". Le Vell stated: "I am innocent of these charges and intend to fight them vigorously." Le Vell was charged under his legal name, Michael Turner, and pleaded not guilty to all of the charges. During the trial, which took place before Judge Michael Henshell at Manchester Crown Court, his barrister described the accuser's evidence as containing a series of inconsistencies. On 10 September 2013, he was found not guilty on all counts, and on 21 March 2014, he returned to his role as Kevin Webster. He left the series shortly after his on-screen return, to combat a drug addiction he developed during his trial. Le Vell returned in October the same year, his character's absence on the show being explained as caring for his father, Bill, in Germany.

== Notes ==
- Kay, Graeme (1991). Life in the Street. Boxtree Limited. ISBN 1-85283-161-8.
- Little, Daran (1995). The Coronation Street story : celebrating thirty five years of the street. London: Boxtree. ISBN 0-7522-1019-X.
