= Sally Dynevor =

English actress (born 1963)

Sally Dynevor MBE
- Born: Sally Jane Whittaker; 30 May 1963 (age 63); Middleton, Lancashire, England
- Occupation: Actress
- Years active: 1985–present
- Known for: Role of Sally Webster in Coronation Street
- Spouse: Tim Dynevor (m. 1995)
- Children: 3, including Phoebe Dynevor
- Relatives: Shirley Dynevor (mother-in-law)

Sally Jane Dynevor (née Whittaker; born 30 May 1963) is an English actress, she is best known for her role as Sally Metcalfe in the ITV soap opera Coronation Street, which she has played since 1986. In 2022, Dynevor competed in the fourteenth series of Dancing on Ice.

== Early life ==
Dynevor was born on 30 May 1963 in Middleton, Lancashire, to Robert and Jennifer Whittaker.

== Career ==
Dynevor trained at Oldham Repertory Theatre and then the Mountview Academy of Theatre Arts. In 1985 she appeared in an episode of the television series Juliet Bravo, playing Wendy Cunningham, a troubled schoolgirl who becomes a heroin addict.

She has made a career out of playing Sally Webster (née Seddon), a bad girl turned tame, on the ITV soap opera Coronation Street. She made her début on the serial in January 1986 and has been with the programme ever since. Dynevor was nominated for Best TV soap Personality at the 2011 Television and Radio Industries Club Awards (TRIC Awards). She also, along with three co-stars, accepted the award for Best Storyline at the 2011 British Soap Awards which revolved around the Dobbs-Websters love triangle (this award is credited to producer, Phil Collinson). At the 2015 British Soap awards, she was nominated for Best On-Screen Partnership (with Joe Duttine), and won the award for Best Comedy Performance. In 2016, Dynevor and Joe Duttine won the award for Best On-Screen Partnership at the British Soap Awards. In October 2021, it was announced that Dynevor would be competing in the fourteenth series of Dancing on Ice. She was paired with Matt Evers and they were the sixth couple to be eliminated in week 7.

== Personal life ==
Dynevor married scriptwriter Tim Dynevor, at Bowdon Parish Church in Cheshire on 9 September 1995. They have three children, all of whom were born in Trafford, including daughters Phoebe and Hattie, who both appeared in the BBC drama series Waterloo Road.

In November 2009, Dynevor was diagnosed with breast cancer the same year her character was, for which she has had chemotherapy and radiotherapy. Dynevor returned to the ITV soap in July 2010 after a six-month break. Both the actor and character went on to make full recoveries.

Since 1999, Dynevor has been an ambassador for the charity ActionAid. She has travelled to India to raise awareness of the organisation and represented the charity on Who Wants to Be a Millionaire?.

Dynevor was appointed Member of the Order of the British Empire (MBE) in the 2021 New Year Honours for services to drama. She collected her medal at a ceremony at Windsor Castle on 2 February 2022.

== Filmography ==
Year	Title	Character	Notes
1985	Juliet Bravo	Wendy Cunningham	1 episode: "Chasing the Dragon"
1986	The Practice	Vicky Flynn	Episode #2.8
1986–present	Coronation Street	Sally Webster	Series regular; 3,700+ episodes
2003	Ek Alag Mausam	Social Worker	Feature film
2005	Coronation Street: Pantomime	Sally Webster	Coronation Street spin-off film; Television film
2013–2015	Text Santa: Coronation Street special	Sally Metcalfe / Annie Walker	TV sketches
2022	Dancing on Ice	Herself	Contestant
2023, 2024, 2025, 2026	Loose Women	Herself	Recurring Guest Panellist

== Awards & nominations ==
Year	Category	Nominee	Result	Ref.
2019	Inside Soap Awards	Soap Superstar	Won	
2016	British Soap Awards	Best On-Screen Partnership	Won	
2015	British Soap Awards	Best Comedy Performance	Won	
2015	British Soap Awards	Best On-Screen Partnership	Nominated	
2012	What's on TV	Soap's Greatest Legend	Nominated	
2011	TRIC Awards	TV Soap Personality	Nominated	
