= List of Coronation Street characters introduced in 1992 =

The following is a list of characters that first appeared in the ITV soap opera Coronation Street in 1992, by order of first appearance.

== Lisa Duckworth ==
Lisa Duckworth
- Coronation Street character
- Portrayed by: Caroline Milmoe
- Duration: 1992–1993
- First appearance: 5 February 1992; Episode 3341
- Last appearance: 12 February 1993; Episode 3502
- Introduced by: Carolyn Reynolds
In-universe information
- Father: Jeff Horton
- Mother: Doreen Horton
- Husband: Terry Duckworth (1992)
- Sons: Tommy Duckworth
- Aunts: Shirley Henderson

Lisa Horton (formerly Duckworth) was played by Caroline Milmoe. Lisa is introduced as the pregnant ex-girlfriend of Terry Duckworth (Nigel Pivaro), who returns to Weatherfield after a four-year absence in 1992. Upon her arrival, Terry is arrested and returned to prison to face charges of GBH and he and Lisa later get married after he is granted day release. However, Terry only intends to use the wedding as a plot to escape, and he flees the church after the ceremony.

In September, Lisa gives birth to a son, whom she names Tommy. Lisa struggles as a single mother. After coming to the conclusion that Terry was never going to be a suitable father to Tommy and that she never loved Terry, Lisa sets her sights on bookie Des Barnes (Philip Middlemiss). Lisa and Des fall in love and intended to move away together, but in February 1993, Lisa is knocked down by a car outside The Rovers Return whilst attempting to retrieve change after dropping her purse. She suffers serious injuries and dies in hospital soon after.

== Paula Maxwell ==
Paula Maxwell
- Coronation Street character
- Portrayed by: Judy Brooke
- Duration: 1992, 1994
- First appearance: 10 February 1992; Episode 3343
- Last appearance: 30 September 1994; Episode 3758
- Introduced by: Carolyn Reynolds
In-universe information
- Occupation: Student

Paula Maxwell, portrayed by Judy Brooke, was a sixth form student at Weatherfield Comprehensive where she befriended Andy McDonald (Nicholas Cockrane). They would hang out in the library together, where they studied for their A-Levels. Despite believing Paula had a boyfriend, she reciprocated romantic feelings and the pair exchanged numbers. Andy's brother Steve (Simon Gregson) also fancied Paula, but she turned him down. Their relationship began to distract her from her academic performance and avoided Andy until their exams were over after headmistress Sue Jeffers called her out and hired Ken Barlow (William Roache) to private tutor her. After their results, both headed to university, however in November, Andy wanted to drop out to be with Paula, but she advised against it so his parents didn't blame her for his decision making. They ended their relationship a month later.

Two years later, Paula applied for a summer job at Bettabuys, where Andy was an assistant manager. Curly Watts (Kevin Kennedy wasn't inclined to hire her as she had no experience, but Andy talked him around. Paula still had feelings for Andy and was pleased when Andy told Vera Duckworth (Liz Dawn) for skiving when she was meant to be instructing her. Despite spending a night together, Andy and Paula didn't rekindle their relationship and both returned to university.

== Ted Sullivan ==
Ted Sullivan
- Coronation Street character
- Portrayed by: William Russell
- First appearance: 19 February 1992; Episode 3347
- Last appearance: 9 September 1992; Episode 3435
- Introduced by: Carolyn Reynolds
- Book appearances: Coronation Street:The Complete Saga
In-universe information
- Sisters: Sarah Brookes
- Wife: Doris Sullivan (backstory); Rita Fairclough (1992)
- Nephews: Roger Brookes; Philip Brookes

Ted Sullivan was played by William Russell. Ted was first seen as a representative for a supplier of the Kabin, and first appears when Rita Fairclough (Barbara Knox) and Mavis Wilton (Thelma Barlow) learn of his plans to retire. Mavis recommends her husband Derek (Peter Baldwin) for his job, and Derek does his best to sell himself to Ted - only to be rejected when Ted tells him his nephew is already lined up to replace him. Meanwhile, Rita catches Ted's attention and he returns again to see her.

Ted courts Rita, and they begin dating. In March, Ted reveals his plan to move to Florida and live there, and to her astonishment, Ted asks Rita to join him as his wife. Initially she turns him down, but later changes her mind and they head out to Florida in search of a new home. When they return however, Ted reveals that the reason he is retiring is because he is terminally ill with a brain tumour. Rita feels cheated, and cancels their plans to emigrate, but agrees to marry Ted in order for them live out his last days as a couple.

Rita and Ted marry weeks later, and by July, Ted is getting weaker as his condition deteriorates. He dies on a park bench on 9 September 1992 watching Percy Sugden (Bill Waddington) play bowls, but his friends do not initially realise he is dead; they believe he is just sleeping. Rita finds him, and is left heartbroken.

== Jeff Horton ==
Jeff Horton
- Coronation Street character
- Portrayed by: Dicken Ashworth
- Duration: 1992–1994, 1996-1997, 2000
- First appearance: 18 May 1992; Episode 3385
- Last appearance: 30 August 2000; Episode 4883
- Introduced by: Carolyn Reynolds (1992); Sue Pritchard (1996); Jane MacNaught (2000)
In-universe information
- Wife: Doreen Horton (until 2012)
- Daughters: Lisa Duckworth
- Grandsons: Tommy Duckworth

Jeff Horton, played by Dicken Ashworth, made his first screen appearance on 18 May 1992. He dies of a heart attack, off-screen, on 5 April 2012, at which time Tommy learns of it, and after originally saying he would not go to the funeral, Tina finally persuades him to. Jeff is the father of Lisa Duckworth (Caroline Milmoe) and grandfather of Tommy Duckworth (Chris Fountain). In his will, Jeff leaves Tommy £12,000 which he is conned out of by his father Terry (Nigel Pivaro).

== Doreen Horton ==
Doreen Horton
- Coronation Street character
- Portrayed by: Annie Raitt
- Duration: 1992–1994, 1996–1997, 2000
- First appearance: 18 May 1992; Episode 3385
- Last appearance: 30 August 2000; Episode 4883
- Introduced by: Carolyn Reynolds (1992); Sue Pritchard (1994, 1995); Jane MacNaught (2000)
In-universe information
- Sisters: Shirley Henderson
- Husband: Jeff Horton (until 2012)
- Daughters: Lisa Duckworth
- Grandsons: Tommy Duckworth

Doreen Horton was the mother of Lisa Duckworth (Caroline Milmoe), played by Annie Raitt and appeared intermittently between 1992 and 2000. On 5 April 2012, Doreen rang Tyrone Dobbs (Alan Halsall) to inform her grandson, Lisa's son Tommy (Chris Fountain), that Jeff (Dicken Ashworth) had a heart attack and died in hospital earlier that day.

== Neil Mitchell ==
Neil Mitchell
- Coronation Street character
- Portrayed by: John Lloyd Fillingham
- Duration: 1992–1993
- First appearance: 6 July 1992; Episode 3406/7
- Last appearance: 31 May 1993; Episode 3548
- Introduced by: Carolyn Reynolds
In-universe information
- Occupation: Builder
- Wife: Denise Osbourne (until 1992)

Neil Mitchell, portrayed by John Lloyd Fillingham, was a builder and local handyman who first arrived on Coronation Street when he was repairing windows at No. 7, where Angie Freeman (Deborah McAndrew) lived. They initially are attracted to each other, but nothing expanded beyond flirting with each other. He was also the ex-husband of Denise Osbourne (Denise Black). Whilst on the street, he clashed with Curly Watts (Kevin Kennedy) after he told his fianceé, Kimberley Taylor (Suzanne Hall) that he had asked him to convert their loft into an observatory. He also had a joke with Mavis Wilton (Thelma Barlow) that Curly looked at her house through his telescope.

== Richard Willmore ==
Richard Willmore
- Coronation Street character
- Portrayed by: Oliver Beamish
- Duration: 1992–1994, 2011
- First appearance: 2 September 1992; Episode 3432
- Last appearance: 28 March 2011
- Introduced by: Carolyn Reynolds (1992, 1993); Sue Pritchard (1994); Phil Collinson (2011)

Richard Willmore is a director from brewery Newton and Ridley, played by Oliver Beamish. He appears for several stints until 1994, but returns in 2011 when Liz (Beverley Callard) and Jim McDonald (Charles Lawson) enlist his help in purchasing The Rovers Return Inn from their son Steve (Simon Gregson) and installing Liz as manager due to differences with their daughter-in-law Becky (Katherine Kelly).

== Carmel Finnan ==
Carmel Finnan
- Coronation Street character
- Portrayed by: Catherine Cusack
- Duration: 1992–1993
- First appearance: 2 September 1992
- Last appearance: 22 March 1993
- Introduced by: Carolyn Reynolds
In-universe information
- Occupation: Student nurse
- Grandfathers: John Finnan

Carmel Finnan, played by Catherine Cusack, was a student nurse classmate of Martin Platt's (Sean Wilson), whom she became obsessed with and tried to ruin his marriage with his then wife Gail (Helen Worth). Considering the fact that she had looked after the Platt Family’s children, Carmel became known as the “Nanny from Hell” by viewers and the Coronation Street cast. The character's condition was later identified as erotomania.

Carmel was born in 1968 to a fifteen-year-old mother. She was brought up by her grandparents, thinking she was their own child; however, she discovered the truth about her parentage at the age of fourteen. She became mentally unstable and became obsessed with Michael McGuire and she made up a story that he had gotten her pregnant. Because of this, her grandparents placed her in a psychiatric hospital and a year later, she left as a happy girl who put her dark past behind her.

In September 1992, Carmel moved to Weatherfield and became friends with Martin. He asked her if she would babysit his three children; Nicky (Warren Jackson), Sarah-Louise (Lynsey King), and David (Thomas Ormson) that night so he and Gail can go out. She agreed and over time, Carmel proved to be good with the children and she became the Platts' babysitter regularly.

When Carmel was frightened by a prowler at her bedsit, she confided in the Platts for comfort and they allowed her to move in with them at 8 Coronation Street. However, Gail and Martin learned there was another side to Carmel and they began to lose her trust; Carmel told Gail that her best mate Sally Webster (Sally Dynevor) didn't like her and she started treating the children as if she was their own mother. There was more concern when Carmel told a woman at Bettabuys that David was her son and when Gail discovered this from Percy Sugden (Bill Waddington), who overheard the conversation, she confronted Carmel with her suspicions, but Carmel lied her way out of the situation and explained she didn't want the woman getting at her for being a babysitter.

In December 1992, Carmel "slept" with a drunken Martin, who thought it was Gail who was in bed with him; Gail was actually at the hospital with her mother Audrey Roberts (Sue Nicholls) when her stepfather Alf (Bryan Mosley) got food poisoning. When Martin discovered he was in bed with Carmel, he demanded answers from her, but she only confessed her love for him. This resulted in Martin to force Carmel to return to Ireland early for Christmas. However, she returned on Christmas Day and told everyone she had missed the boat to Ireland, but she only returned so she can see Martin and resumed her campaign to get Martin to confess to Gail that "he's in love with her."

When Gail discovered Carmel's infidelity after she tried to get Martin into bed with her at her bedsit, she threw her out of No.8. She then returned in March 1993, and told a shocked Gail, Martin and Ivy Brennan (Lynne Perrie) that she was pregnant with Martin's baby. This caused Gail to lose Martin's trust, but he later convinced her that he'd been faithful. That same month, Carmel tried to kidnap David while Sally was minding him; Sally rescued him by threatening to phone the police. After discovering the incident, Gail angrily confronted Carmel at her bedsit, telling her to stay away from her, her children, and mostly; her husband. They had an argument at the top of the stairs, which ended with Carmel falling down the stairs and breaking her leg. Gail was afraid that she'd hurt Carmel's unborn baby, but when examined at the hospital, the Platts discovered that Carmel had lied about being pregnant.

Carmel lied to the police that Gail had pushed her down the stairs. Gail was shocked while Martin was furious. Carmel's grandfather John (Shay Gorman) arrived in Weatherfield to talk the Platts about what happened. Gail explained that she confronted Carmel to stay away from her and her family while Martin told him that she falsely accused him of getting her pregnant. This made John realise that Carmel was make believing again, and he told the Platts of her mental history and that he would take her home to Ireland to get the care she needed.

The character of Carmel and her storyline received mostly positive reviews from Coronation Street viewers, but one was negative and called it a "stalker storyline" and viewed it as "creepy."

== Doug Murray ==
Doug Murray
- Coronation Street character
- Portrayed by: Brian Hibbard
- Duration: 1992–1993
- First appearance: 23 October 1992; Episode 3454
- Last appearance: 18 June 1993; Episode 3556
- Introduced by: Carolyn Reynolds
In-universe information
- Other names: Dave Matthews
- Sisters: Jean Forbes

Doug Murray – real name Dave Matthews – was a mechanic. He was played by actor Brian Hibbard. After returning to Britain from the Middle East after his classic car restoration business failed and he had got into debt, Doug sought employment at MVB motors. The Inland Revenue tracked Doug down and he was forced to declare bankruptcy. Doug initially lived at his sister's house but moved out after constant arguments with her husband and moved addresses. Doug dated Deirdre Barlow (Anne Kirkbride) for a while but this ended when her daughter Tracy (Dawn Acton) attempted to seduce him as she had a crush on him and wanted to hurt her mother. Eventually Doug decided to leave Weatherfield after realising that his options were limited. He stole a Jaguar car belonging to his boss Mike Baldwin (Johnny Briggs) and drove away. He traded the Jaguar in for a Mercedes at a dealership, and later fled to Germany in the Mercedes.

== Harry Potts ==
Harry Potts
- Coronation Street character
- Portrayed by: Russell Dixon
- Duration: 1992–1993, 1995
- First appearance: 26 October 1992
- Last appearance: 5 July 1995
- Introduced by: Carolyn Reynolds
In-universe information
- Occupation: Caretaker; Councillor

Harold "Harry" Potts, played by Russell Dixon, made his first screen appearance on 26 October 1992.

When Derek Wilton (Peter Baldwin) is employed as the new deputy caretaker at Weatherfield Comprehensive, Harry starts giving him a hard time as he wanted his nephew to get the job. Harry makes Derek do most of the work and gets him into trouble with Ken Barlow (William Roache). Derek eventually reports Harry to the headmistress and she tells him to keep notes on Harry's behaviour. When Derek gives her his report, he learns that Harry has a new job at a different school. Harry was also a member of the local council. When he wants to join the Social Services Committee, he asks Alf Roberts (Bryan Mosley) for his support. Harry begins to see Alf as an ally and they occasionally have a drink together in the Rovers Return. Harry befriends the landlady, Bet Gilroy (Julie Goodyear), and starts giving her information about a plan to widen Rosamund Street and demolish the Rovers. Harry promises to fight for the pub and Bet gives him drinks on the house. Bet later learns that the council have no intention of demolishing the pub and realises that Harry has been conning all the local landladies. Bet and her friend get revenge on Harry by inviting him to Reg Holdsworth's (Ken Morley) engagement party and make him buy the drinks all night. A couple of years later, Alf is accused of embezzling money from the Mayor's charity fund. Harry tells Alf that he has his support. Alf's wife, Audrey (Sue Nicholls), learns that Harry is having an affair with the woman who prepares the cheques for the Mayor, and Alf realises that Harry was getting her to make up cheques for him. Harry is brought in to be questioned by Alf's superior and he refuses to say anything until his solicitor arrives. A few months later, Harry is found guilty of embezzlement and sent to prison for nine months.

== Denise Osbourne ==
Denise Osbourne
- Coronation Street character
- Portrayed by: Denise Black
- Duration: 1992–1997, 2007, 2017
- First appearance: Episode 3472; 4 December 1992
- Last appearance: Episode 9183; 9 June 2017
- Introduced by: Carolyn Reynolds (1992); Steve November (2007); Kate Oates (2017)
- Book appearances: Coronation Street:The Complete Saga
In-universe information
- Occupation: Hairdresser
- Father: Roy
- Mother: Irene
- Sisters: Alison Dunkley
- Husband: Frank Osbourne (backstory); Neil Mitchell (until 1992)
- Sons: Daniel Osbourne
- Grandsons: Bertie Osbourne

Denise Osbourne (also Mitchell) was introduced as a new local hairdresser and was played by Denise Black. She made her first appearance on 4 December 1992 in a stint which lasted five years. She returned ten years later and made her final appearance on 10 June 2007. On 3 April 2017, it was announced that Black would be reprising her role as Denise after finishing her two-year stint on Emmerdale as Joanie Wright in January 2017, and returned on-screen on 30 May 2017 and departed on 9 June 2017 at the conclusion of her storyline.

Denise's first marriage to wealthy solicitor Frank Osbourne ended when she left him for Neil Mitchell. They later married but had separated by late 1992 so Denise came to Coronation Street to try to build a new life. She opened a hairdressing and beauty salon at No. 2, living in the flat above and turned to Neil, who worked as a builder, to fit out the premises.

From her first appearance, many local men were attracted to Denise and by Christmas supermarket manager Reg Holdsworth (Ken Morley), barman Jack Duckworth (Bill Tarmey) and mechanic Doug Murray, all asked Denise for favours and fought to be the first to take her out. Denise, however, invited all of them to her flat and told them she was not interested. Neil was happy to stay friends until he discovered he had a love rival in Hanif Ruparell, despite the fact that he was dating Angie Freeman. Denise and Hanif's affair was initially just for pleasure but eventually Denise fell in love with her friend. When she told Hanif how she felt after arranging a romantic dinner, he rejected her. Denise was so hurt, she threw red wine at him and stormed out of the restaurant.

In the meantime, Don Brennan (Geoffrey Hinsliff) fell for Denise when she comforted him about his leg being amputated. Denise showed him her deformed hand and said she managed to live with it. Don agreed to invest money in Denise's business but she soon realised that Don wanted more than friendship and was plagued with nuisance telephone calls and anonymous pranks that lasted for several weeks, causing her much anguish. She suspected Neil and Hanif and was outraged when she learned that Don was responsible — helped by Hanif, who had a friend who worked at the telephone exchange.

Early in 1994, Denise started dating Ken Barlow (William Roache) and both were surprised when she got pregnant. Denise decided to keep the baby but had a miscarriage. However, the doctors told Denise she was carrying twins and the survivor was healthy. Ken suggested they get married but Denise decided to remain independent and ended their relationship, telling Ken she didn't want him at the birth. She found life more difficult than she expected during her pregnancy and had to get help at the salon from a friend, Jon Welch. She hoped that Jon would buy the business but he was unable to raise the money. Even when she went into labour, she refused to let Ken know but later changed her mind and Ken was there as she gave birth to their son, Daniel (Lewis Harney/Dominic Holmes/Rob Mallard), and was very supportive. However, Denise continued to reject Ken and refused to put his name on Daniel's birth certificate but was willing to let him babysit. Over the next few months, Denise and Jon became closer until in April 1995, he made a pass at her but she turned him down so he left.

Meanwhile, Ken had troubles of his own as his stepdaughter, Tracy (Dawn Acton/Kate Ford), was in hospital after a drug overdose but he still wanted access to Daniel. After Ken threatened legal action, Denise lost her temper and went to visit her sister, Alison Dunkley in Macclesfield. After Ken tracked her down, she returned to Weatherfield and seemed more willing to let Ken into her life. In July 1995, Ken bought No. 1 and he, Denise and Daniel moved in — but she kept the flat above No. 2 and refused to let Bill Webster (Peter Armitage) rent it in December. Her reasons for keeping No. 2 became apparent. Brian Dunkley, Denise's brother-in-law came to do the bookkeeping but they had been having an affair for two years. Ken didn't suspect anything but Alison realised that Brian was unfaithful and turned to Denise for comfort. In January 1996, Denise tried to end it and asked Ken if he still wanted to marry her and he agreed. However, Brian was not prepared to give up easily. Ken found out about the affair and threw Denise out. Denise decided to leave with Brian and left Daniel with Ken, feeling she could never offer him a stable life. However, in November 1996, she changed her mind and came back, claiming that Ken had no legal right to keep him. She agreed to allow him to visit Daniel but, after a few months, Ken found the travelling and emotional strain of visiting too difficult, especially when Daniel called Brian "Daddy" and cut all contact with Denise and Daniel.

Nothing was heard from Denise until 2007 when she sent Ken a card having read about Tracy's imprisonment for murder. Ken's wife Deirdre (Anne Kirkbride) blamed him for Tracy's problems so Ken stayed at a B&B in Manchester. As he went for a stroll, Ken found Denise running a new hairdressers' in the heart of the city. Preparing for the worst, Ken went in to speak to Denise and she invited him to her flat for a cup of tea. Sufficiently revived, he told Denise that he would have to reduce his contributions to Daniel's trust fund but Ken was unable to bring himself to ask Denise if he could re-establish contact with their son. She promised Ken she would ask Daniel if he wanted to meet him. Ken was relieved to learn that Daniel had agreed. Later, Denise invited Ken to move in with her and Daniel but Daniel began to resent Ken's presence so Denise took him to Weatherfield to make amends with Deirdre, but this ended with Deirdre slapping Denise. Following the confrontation between Deirdre and Denise, Deirdre visited Ken and apologised for her behaviour and asked him to come home but he refused. Ken and Denise grew closer and she became convinced that Ken wanted to resume their relationship and needing help with Daniel, Denise made a clumsy pass but Ken made it clear that he wasn't interested before returning to Deirdre.

In late 2016, Daniel returns to Weatherfield after Ken suffers a major stroke and is hospitalised. He receives a cold reception from the other Barlows, however they warm to him when he reveals that he has not seen Denise since she walked out on him six years ago, when he was only 15 years old. In May 2017, Daniel is revealed as the culprit who pushed Ken down the stairs, and Ken finds Denise's belongings buried in the garden. He becomes convinced that Daniel has murdered Denise, and during a minor scuffle while Daniel holds Ken hostage, Denise returns, much to Daniel's shock and horror. She was devastated when he was arrested and told Ken that she was sorry for his loss to his late wife Deirdre.

In 2021 it is revealed that Denise has gifted Daniel a house. When asked by Paul Foreman (Peter Ash) if he will be moving away, he replies that he is likely to rent it out in order to get some extra cash.

Newspaper The Chorley Citizen said Denise was best remembered as "Ken's bit on the side". Laura-Jayne Tyler from Inside Soap called the character a "homewrecker".

== Fiona Middleton ==
Fiona Middleton, played by Angela Griffin, made her first appearance on 14 December 1992. She was a hairdresser and later manager at Denise Osbourne's (Denise Black) salon. She also has a brief singing career. Fiona's best friend is Maxine Heavey (Tracy Shaw). Fiona dates Steve McDonald (Simon Gregson), and has an affair with Steve's father Jim (Charles Lawson), which was revealed on Fiona's wedding day to Alan McKenna. She also briefly dated Tony Horrocks (Lee Warburton). Steve and Fiona reconcile to help her raise her and Alan's son, Morgan, but he cheats on her with Maxine.
