= Fiona Middleton =

Fictional character in Coronation Street

- Coronation Street character
- Portrayed by: Angela Griffin
- Duration: 1992–1998, 2019
- First appearance: Episode 3476; 14 December 1992
- Last appearance: Episode 9854; 21 August 2019
- Introduced by: Carolyn Reynolds (1992); Iain MacLeod (2019)
- Spin-off appearances: Coronation Street: Viva Las Vegas! (1997)
In-universe information
- Occupation: Hairdresser
- Father: Clive Middleton
- Mother: Pam Middleton
- Brothers: Lee Middleton
- Husband: John Brooker (post-1998 until 2019)
- Sons: Morgan Middleton
- Daughters: Emma Brooker

Fiona Middleton is a fictional character from the British ITV soap opera Coronation Street, played by Angela Griffin. The actress secured the role following an audition. She was sceptical that it would lead to much and initially presumed that the producers would keep her around for a short time. However, positive viewer reaction led to her role within the show being increased. She made her debut appearance in the episode broadcast on 14 December 1992.

Fiona is portrayed as ambitious, hard working, uncomplicated, and someone who lives for the moment. Griffin found the lack of information about Fiona's background to be a benefit, as it allowed her time to establish her character's personality. Fiona was introduced as the Street's new hairdresser, who took up a job at Denise Osbourne's (Denise Black) salon, which she later purchased with the help of her brother Lee Middleton (Nicholas Bailey). Fiona also embarked on careers as a singer and a model, which helped to increase her confidence.

Fiona became best friends with Maxine Peacock (Tracy Shaw) during her time on the Street, and had a long on-off relationship with Steve McDonald (Simon Gregson). After breaking up with Steve, Fiona has a relationship with mechanic Tony Horrocks (Lee Warburton), which is complicated by Maxine's feelings for him. Fiona eventually becomes engaged to policeman Alan McKenna (Glenn Hugill), but their relationship is tested by his dark persona and Fiona's affair with Steve's father Jim McDonald (Charles Lawson). Fiona finds out she is pregnant with Alan's child shortly before his departure. She reunites with Steve, who wants to help her raise her son, Morgan (Connor Chatburn).

After six years of playing Fiona, Griffin chose to leave Coronation Street to pursue further acting roles, as she did not want to wait around for her next big storyline. On-screen, Fiona discovers that Steve has cheated on her with Maxine. She sells her salon and leaves Weatherfield with Morgan in September 1998. For her portrayal of Fiona, Griffin won the Most Popular Newcomer accolade at the 1st National Television Awards. Griffin reprised the role in June 2019, and made a brief cameo appearance on 21 August.

== Casting ==
Following a guest appearance in fellow British soap Emmerdale, sixteen year old actress Angela Griffin successfully auditioned for the role of hairdresser Fiona. Singer Mel B also auditioned for the role, before joining the Spice Girls. Griffin was initially contracted for a two-week guest appearance as Denise Osborne's (Denise Black) assistant. She made her first appearance as Fiona on 14 December 1992, becoming the show's second regular black character to be introduced. Of her early days in the show, Griffin stated "I feel as if I've been lucky, I've been gradually introduced into the programme and have had a chance to get used to everything, whereas some actors come into Coronation Street and get thrown in at the deep end straight away."

Griffin was initially sceptical that the part would lead to much, but the audience reacted well to the character and her role within the show was increased. Shortly after, Griffin gave up her studies due to her new workload. Griffin never expected Fiona to become a central character in the series and presumed producers would keep her around for a short time. Her brother also joked that she was originally a glorified on-set extra, which Griffin believed helped her remain grounded in her early years.

== Development ==
=== Characterisation and career ===
Griffin admitted that she loved her character, and said she can be loud, yet quite reserved at times. She thought the writers could take Fiona in any direction as her background had not been revealed and viewers did not know "what makes her tick." Griffin told an Inside Soap writer that because very little was known about Fiona when she was introduced, she found it to be a benefit, as it allowed her the time to establish Fiona's personality. Griffin called Fiona "very uncomplicated" and a hard worker. She also said that Fiona just wants to earn her money and go out and have fun. Griffin further described her as someone who "lives for the moment and she has absolutely no hang-ups about what she does – or what she says!"

In The Official Coronation Street Annual, Rob Sharp describes Fiona as a "cute crimper" who "certainly turned a few heads" when she starts working at Denise Osbourne's hair salon. He added "the prospect of a quick trim immediately became more alluring for the men of Weatherfield." Fiona is an "ambitious career girl" and since her move onto Coronation Street, her "fortunes soared" and she began managing her own business called Hair by Fiona Middleton. Fiona and her best friend Maxine Peacock (Tracy Shaw) both had distinct styles. A writer from Inside Soap profiled her stating "stylish hairdresser Fiona avoids the sex kitten look of her best friend Maxine, favouring autumnal shades and natural fibers, which she mixes and matches with aplomb." In 1997, Griffin believed that Fiona had changed so much "she was in danger of becoming a bit hard." Writers decided to show a "softer side" to Fiona by showing she can be vulnerable.

Producers lined up a second career for Fiona as a singer. When she outshines Maxine during drunken gig, Alec Gilroy (Roy Barraclough) notices her talent. He becomes her agent and secures her more shows. When Griffin learned of the story she was "terrified". She told Steven Murphy from Inside Soap that she was scared about singing in front of others and hired a singing coach to help her improve. She added "he just gave me the confidence to get up there, do it and not care." Fiona's gig was filmed on location and Griffin did not have time to do rehearsals and found the experience "daunting". The actress did not think that a singing career was right for Fiona because she had begun to achieve more in her hairdressing business. She added "I think she might get up and sing occasionally, but she won't do it full time."

In the wake of Steve's marriage, Fiona is offered a modelling job that was originally meant for Raquel Watts (Sarah Lancashire). The offer boosts her confidence and brings her out of a depression. Griffin told Richard Arnold from Inside Soap that Fiona is "quite flattered" with the attentions she receives while modelling. She likes having the "ego boost that came along just when she was feeling unattractive."

When Denise decides to sell the hair salon, Fiona's brother Lee Middleton (Nicholas Bailey) agrees to loan her the money to buy the business. She is eager to show her new found maturity by naming the salon after herself rather than creating a pun styled name. Griffin thought that her character was ambitious and buying the salon proved it. She sets herself goals and achieves them. Fiona feels great because she has always wanted her own Salon. Fiona admires fellow character and businesswoman Rita Tanner (Barbara Knox). Griffin told Peake that Rita is "Fiona's role model [...] if she can be as successful as her, she'd be very pleased." She also envisioned Fiona becoming a stronger character in the same way that Coronation Street had previously developed their "great women" characters. Fiona also has to deal with Maxine, who does not behave professionally at work. She continues to test Fiona's patience. Griffin concluded that "Fiona will just let her know who's in charge."

=== Relationship with Steve McDonald ===
After Steve McDonald (Simon Gregson) breaks up with his girlfriend Vicky Arden (Chloe Newsome), he decides to pursue Fiona. Gregson reckoned she was a good match for his character, as he needed someone he could have a good time with and who shared his interests. He also wanted someone who was not looking for a serious relationship. Gregson described Fiona as a female version of Steve, and said "She's a real woman of the Nineties who knows what she wants. She's also pretty streetwise, which Steve loves." Fiona and Steve's relationship is strained when she becomes fed up of playing hard to get, and then shows him up at a party. Griffin said Fiona is giving Steve "a run for his money" and that he is not sure how to react, as he has never met someone like her before. The actress also said that Steve treated Vicky badly, and Fiona will not put up with the same behaviour, which is why she was angry that he treated her as "an unpaid skivvy" at his party.

Fiona makes plans to go on holiday with her friends without telling Steve. Griffin explained "Fiona is just out for a good time and the relationship with Steve is too much like hard work. Eventually she gets so sick of trying to keep out of his way that she opts for a trip to Tenerife and deliberately keeps him in the dark." Fiona's actions force Steve to realise that he really cares about her and he tries to stop her from leaving. He offers to take Fiona to Miami, but this causes her to break up with him before she goes to Tenerife. Griffin said that Fiona felt like he was bullying her into going on holiday with him and she will not put up with him ordering her around. Griffin thought that when Fiona returns from the holiday, she might realise how much she missed Steve. She also noted that Fiona obviously liked him or she would not be dating him.

Upon her return, Fiona is taken aback at how nice Steve is to her, so she feels that she cannot be mean to him. Her time away also made her realise that Steve had good intentions with the Miami tickets and he just wanted to spend more time with her. The couple become closer when Steve goes to Fiona for support, following a meeting with the probation services. Fiona was touched that he trusted her and in return she "made it clear that she's there for him." Griffin believed that when Steve is with Fiona he is unsure of himself, which she likes. The actress reckoned that Fiona was falling in love with him, which surprised her, as their relationship had not been serious to begin with. Griffin also said that her off-screen friendship with Gregson initially made their character's love scenes embarrassing to film.

When Fiona meets Vicky, she immediately sees her as a threat to her relationship. Steve carries on gambling and it becomes clear that Vicky still has feelings for Steve. Vicky discovers that Fiona and Steve's relationship has been difficult despite them deciding to move in together. Steve promises to stop gambling but when he learns that Vicky has inherited £240,000, he gets back with her. When Fiona discovers that the pair are getting married, she turns to Des Barnes (Philip Middlemiss) for comfort. This causes problems with her best friend Maxine, who has romantic feelings for Des. Griffin believed that Fiona was actually more annoyed at Steve for flaunting his relationship with Vicky in her presence than losing him. She concluded "I reckon she's had a pretty lucky escape."

=== Relationship with Tony Horrocks ===
Fiona begins a relationship with Tony Horrocks (Lee Warburton), who arrives in Weatherfield to work as a mechanic. Tony is a "strong but silent" type of character which works in his favour. Fiona takes an instant liking to Tony because he is so unlike Steve. Griffin told Inside Soap's Arnold that in comparison to Steve, Tony is "quite shy and doesn't talk about himself the whole time." Fiona is initially unsure about starting a serious relationship with him because she fears all men are like Steve. But Tony "soon persuades her he's worth it" and Fiona decides "she's gonna have some fun" with him. Fiona begins to push Tony away and avoids the topic of moving in together. Griffin revealed that "Fiona likes to keep Tony at arms length. She doesn't want to live with him in case he turns out to be a drug dealer or something!"

When Steve is sent to prison he asks Fiona to visit him. His request makes Fiona realise that she still has feelings for him. Griffin told Jon Peake of Inside Soap that "just because you hate someone, you don't stop loving them." She likes becoming his confidant and excuses his past behaviour. She added "she realises he's only human and she's very confused about her feelings." Fiona decides to hide her confusion from Tony because she is not ready to be with Steve again. Griffin also thought that Fiona needed to decide what she wanted before causing Tony any hurt because he "feels threatened by Steve as it is." Tony and Steve are completely different and acts as a safe option for Fiona. Griffin explained that her character tried dating the "rough lad" but decided on the "nice boy". She enjoyed the security he provided for six months but ultimately "it's not enough".

Writers made the story more complicated when they depicted Maxine secretly lusting after Tony. Fiona lies to Maxine about visiting Steve because she advises her against associating with him. Fiona later admits to Tony that she has been visiting Steve. He angrily issues her with an ultimatum to choose between him and Steve, which forces them to break up. Just days after their split, Maxine decides to seduce Tony. This makes their friendship "volatile" and Fiona is left unable to forgive Maxine.

=== Alan McKenna ===
"She has been looking for a father figure. Fiona's dad turned up at the opening of the salon and it was quite obvious that he has never paid Fiona a compliment in her life. So I think it's quite important for Fiona to prove to herself that she can get respect from an older man."

— Griffin on Fiona's attraction to older men.

Producers next paired Fiona with show newcomer policeman Alan McKenna (Glenn Hugill). Alan is older than Fiona who thinks she needs an older man's influence in her life. Griffin told Inside Soap's Helen Childs that Alan is independent which Fiona finds "very appealing" because "she loves being looked after." Fiona wants an "adult relationship" considering Steve and Tony were immature. Griffin also revealed that her character was longing for a "father figure" because her father had never supported Fiona. She added "it was quite obvious that he has never paid Fiona a compliment in her life." This makes Fiona determined to gain respect from an older man. Writers once again included Fiona's interfering friend Maxine in the story. This time Maxine disapproves because she suspects that Alan is hiding a secret wife. She also takes issue with Alan changing his plans when they arranged romantic dates. Fiona does not listen to Maxine's concerns and Griffin even believed Fiona envisioned settling down with Alan.

Fiona and Alan's relationship progressed rapidly with writers creating no end of drama between the two. They become very serious about their future together but Alan is hiding a dark persona. Fiona accuses Alan of being a racist when he does not ask her to accompany him to the policeman's ball. The real reason being that Alan finds it difficult to commit. Hugill told Peake (Inside Soap) that Alan feels that he has not experienced the same successes as Fiona. He views her as a "single-minded, ambitious woman who manages to achieve what she wants without anyone hating her, which is something Alan hasn't achieved yet." Alan thinks Fiona is "the better person" and he creates a tough persona to hide his vulnerabilities and he "fears greatly" he may lose her.

Like her previous stories, writers gave Steve a role in her relationship dramas. Fiona keeps her past with Steve from Alan. When he discovers they used to date he is furious. Hugill said it "rankles him badly". Alan is unable to deal with things calmly and puts his issues with Fiona and Steve aside. But Hugill believed this behaviour would end badly because "inside is a lot of lava waiting to pour out." Alan uses Steve's mother Liz McDonald (Beverley Callard) to try apprehend criminal Fraser Henderson (Glyn Grain). Fiona informs Liz which causes a row with Alan. Hugill explained that is "the first time we've seen him crack. Up to now, he's been cool and manipulative."

With Alan working long shifts on the police force the pair do not get much time together. He suggests they move in together which she immediately accepts. They also become engaged but Griffin hoped they would not marry because she feared them becoming a "dull" couple. Another problem is Alan's personality, but Griffin explained "she does trust him, but whether he's trustworthy or not, who knows?"

=== Affair with Jim McDonald ===
Writers decided to introduce infidelity into the plot. When Steve is released from prison, Fiona "feels sorry for him" because no one will support him. She tries to be there for him which annoys Alan. Griffin defended her character stating that she "doesn't want to bed him again" and "will help anyone who needs it." Alan dislikes Fiona being associated with an ex-prisoner and her ex-lover. This causes their relationship to become so volatile that she turns to Steve's father Jim McDonald (Charles Lawson) for support. Griffin explained that "Jim is always someone she's had a soft spot for, she's always felt like she could confide in him." This encounters brings the two characters closer towards intimacy. Jim provides Fiona with comfort and after talking, they go upstairs where they have sex. Jim is "delighted with himself" and believes he and Fiona have a future together, but she would rather forget that it happened.

Fiona keeps her night with Jim a secret. But during her wedding to Alan, Jim turns up at the church and is enraged. Hugill enjoyed working alongside Griffin and praised her for being "so talented and so giving." Fiona finds out she is pregnant with Alan's child but he leaves the show following the discovery of Fiona and Jim's affair.

=== Pregnancy and reconciliation with Steve ===
Following her break-up with Alan, Fiona needs support and Steve decides to help her. Gregson did not think Steve and Fiona could realistically get back together straight away. In an interview with Inside Soap's Simon Timblick he teased "all good things come to those who wait." But Fiona and Jim's affair is "a complete shock" for Steve and he is "very angry" and needs time to adjust. He added that "a lot has happened between Steve and Fiona over the last few months, but there's absolutely no reason why they can't become good friends again."

Fiona has to come to terms with the prospect of being a single parent. Steve decides he wants to be with Fiona and help her raise her child. Fiona is unsure about giving their relationship another try. Griffin said that Fiona "doesn't know what she wants". She is "excited" about having a baby but "nervous" about being a lone parent. She does love Steve because he was her "first love, but the fact he's done so many nasty things to her in the past is weighing heavily on her mind."

Fiona gives birth five weeks premature and calls the baby Morgan. She was not required to film a birth scene but did portray Fiona going into labour. To prepare for the scenes she worked with a midwife who coached her on making realistic contractions that would occur when a woman goes into labour. Griffin said that it "terrified" her because it made her realise that giving birth is not easy. Producers hired a baby, Connor Chatburn, to play Morgan. He was cast after his family believed that his mother bared a physical resemblance to Griffin. The actress enjoyed filming the mother and son scenes as she portrayed Fiona's journey into motherhood.

=== Departure ===
"I have turned out the light, but I haven't shut the door on ever going back. I had a fantastic time there and it's great the writers have not killed me off. Maybe one day I'll just be sitting in the salon with my head under one of the hairdryers - who knows."

— Griffin on her exit from the show.

After six years of playing Fiona, Griffin chose to leave Coronation Street to pursue further acting roles. Producers did not want to kill her character off, as Fiona was popular with viewers, giving Griffin the chance to return to the serial in the future. Griffin filmed her final scenes on 28 August 1998. She later told Rebecca Fletcher of the Daily Mirror that while there was a lot more her character could do, she knew there would be around a year long wait between her last storyline and the next big one. She continued, "I was 21 and impatient. I didn't want to wait that long. I wanted to get out in the big wide world and see what else there was. And I whispered to myself, 'If it doesn't work out, I can always go back'."

In the lead up to her exit, Fiona discovers that Steve has cheated on her with Maxine. The storyline begins when Fiona goes to visit her mother. Steve and Maxine go out and get drunk together, which leads them to discuss what things could have been like if they had worked out differently. They end up having sex and Steve "doesn't give Fiona a second thought." Upon her return, Fiona asks Steve to marry her and he accepts. Of Steve's decision, Gregson commented, "He thinks the world of Fiona's son Morgan and does love Fiona. He thinks of the night with Maxine as just a temporary aberration. He's a randy bugger." Gregson admitted he was ready for the criticism he was likely to receive from fans of Fiona and Steve.

Fiona "has a huge bust-up" with Maxine and Steve when she learns of their one-night stand. She "goes ballistic" at them and says that they are suited to one another. She also argues with Jim, after he discovers she knew that Steve pushed him off some scaffolding. Fiona then receives an offer for the salon from Fred Elliott (John Savident) and she decides to sell up and leave Weatherfield.

=== Return ===
In September 2014, Griffin mooted a potential return storyline for Fiona, saying "My idea for a return storyline – if I were to go back – was that I'd have been pregnant by Steve when I left. And I could then return with the child." She also thought that Fiona could return alongside Steve's former girlfriends and wives. In January 2018, Griffin said she would be open to a return, following the news that her former co-star Sean Wilson was returning as Martin Platt. She told Lorraine Kelly, "If he's going back you never know who else might go back. You never know. Never say never!" Griffin also said that any return storyline would have to involve Steve. A few months later, viewers speculated that newcomer Emma Brooker, played by Alexandra Mardell, could be Fiona and Steve's secret daughter. At the time, Mardell stated that it was not true, and her character was just an apprentice hairdresser, who has come to work at the local salon.

In June 2019, it was announced Griffin was reprising her role, and that Emma was likely Fiona and Steve's daughter. Griffin made a brief return on 21 August 2019, as the truth about Emma's parentage is revealed. The storyline begins when Emma's father dies, leading her to contact Fiona. After learning that Steve is her biological father, Emma contacts Fiona via Skype, as she is living in Australia, to talk about their family. Griffin filmed the scene in the show's studios.

== Reception ==
For her portrayal of Fiona, Griffin won the Most Popular Newcomer accolade at the 1st National Television Awards in 1995. She was nominated for "Best Actress" at the 1997 and the 1998 Inside Soap Awards.

Of Fiona's early impact on the show, the Daily Mirror's Helen Weathers stated, "The audience reaction to the Street's new wild-haired saucepot was so positive that Granada bosses decided Fiona Middleton had to stay." An All About Soap writer called Fiona "one of the show's best-loved characters", and said Griffin played her "with a confidence, fire and attitude that made her a hit with the public." Inside Soap's Steven Murphy branded Fiona as "feisty" and a "crooning crimper". Another writer for the magazine observed that Fiona "knows how to treat her men to keep them keen, and there's no doubt local whiz kid Steve McDonald was happy to play kiss chase for as long as it took to reel in feisty Fee!" Helen Childs branded her a "sexy snipper". Fellow writer Jon Peake opined that "canny crimper" Fiona "really should know better" than to ever get involved with Steve again. Not impressed by Steve's (Simon Gregson) treatment of Fiona, Arnold joked that "it's a wonder the street's top hairdresser didn't take her scissors to him."

Griffin was praised during Fiona's singing storyline by John Millar of the Daily Record. He wrote, "Perplexity has also struck the usually razor-sharp hairdresser Fiona Middleton - who can't decide whether to take up Alec Gilroy's offer of more showbiz bookings. The scenes between Fiona (Angela Griffin) and Alec (Roy Barrowclough) were excellent because they're both fine actors." Millar later commented on the character's poor romantic history, writing "Poor wee Fiona (Angela Griffin) really does seem destined to be unlucky in love. Even though she's the sexiest looking girl in the Street. she has had a series of ill-fated romances. Now I'll bet that her fling with dashing copper Alan is about to hit a dead-end."

The character's exit from the show was seen by over 16 million viewers. In 2016, David Brown of the Radio Times thought Fiona could be one of ten characters that could return to the show, saying "Ideally you'd want all of Steve McDonald's ex-wives and girlfriends to turn up at once in a stretch limo, but the likeliest candidate for a return would be Fiona. She could be on her uppers and seeking help from Steve, perhaps accompanied by her now-teenaged son Morgan, who could set about breaking some hearts." In a similar feature in 2019, Charlie Milward of Digital Spy included Fiona on his list of seven characters new producer Iain MacLeod should bring back. Milward said Fiona's "time on the street would have clients in the salon gossiping for weeks." Marianna Manson from Closer Online put Fiona on her list of the 11 most iconic black characters in British soap operas and opined that she had a "complicated love life".
