= Norris Cole (Coronation Street) =

Fictional character from Coronation Street

- Coronation Street character
- Portrayed by: Malcolm Hebden
- Duration: 1994–1997, 1999–2017, 2019–2020
- First appearance: 11 March 1994
- Last appearance: 24 June 2020
- Introduced by: Sue Pritchard (1994); Jane MacNaught (1999); Iain MacLeod (2019)
- Spin-off appearances: A Knights Tale (2010); Tram Crash News Flash (2010); Text Santa (2012–2013)
In-universe information
- Other names: Norris Benjamin Cole
- Occupation: Newsagent (retired)
- Mother: Eunice Cole
- Half-brothers: Ramsay Clegg
- Wife: Myrtle Hargreaves (until 1994); Angela Catchpole (1995–1999); Mary Taylor (2017–2020)
- Grandmothers: Delilah Cole

Norris Cole is a fictional character from the British ITV soap opera Coronation Street, played by Malcolm Hebden. He made his first screen appearance during the episode broadcast on 11 March 1994. Hebden had previously played the role of Carlos, Mavis Wilton's (Thelma Barlow) Spanish boyfriend, in ten episodes in 1974 to 1975. Norris appeared on a recurring basis, until he was written out in April 1997 by Brian Park. However, two years later; the character was reintroduced on a regular basis. Hebden continued to appear on the soap until December 2017, when he suffered a heart attack. Following his recovery, he made several guest returns, before his retirement from acting in January 2021 due to his health. The character was killed off-screen on 15 September 2021.

== Development ==
=== Casting ===
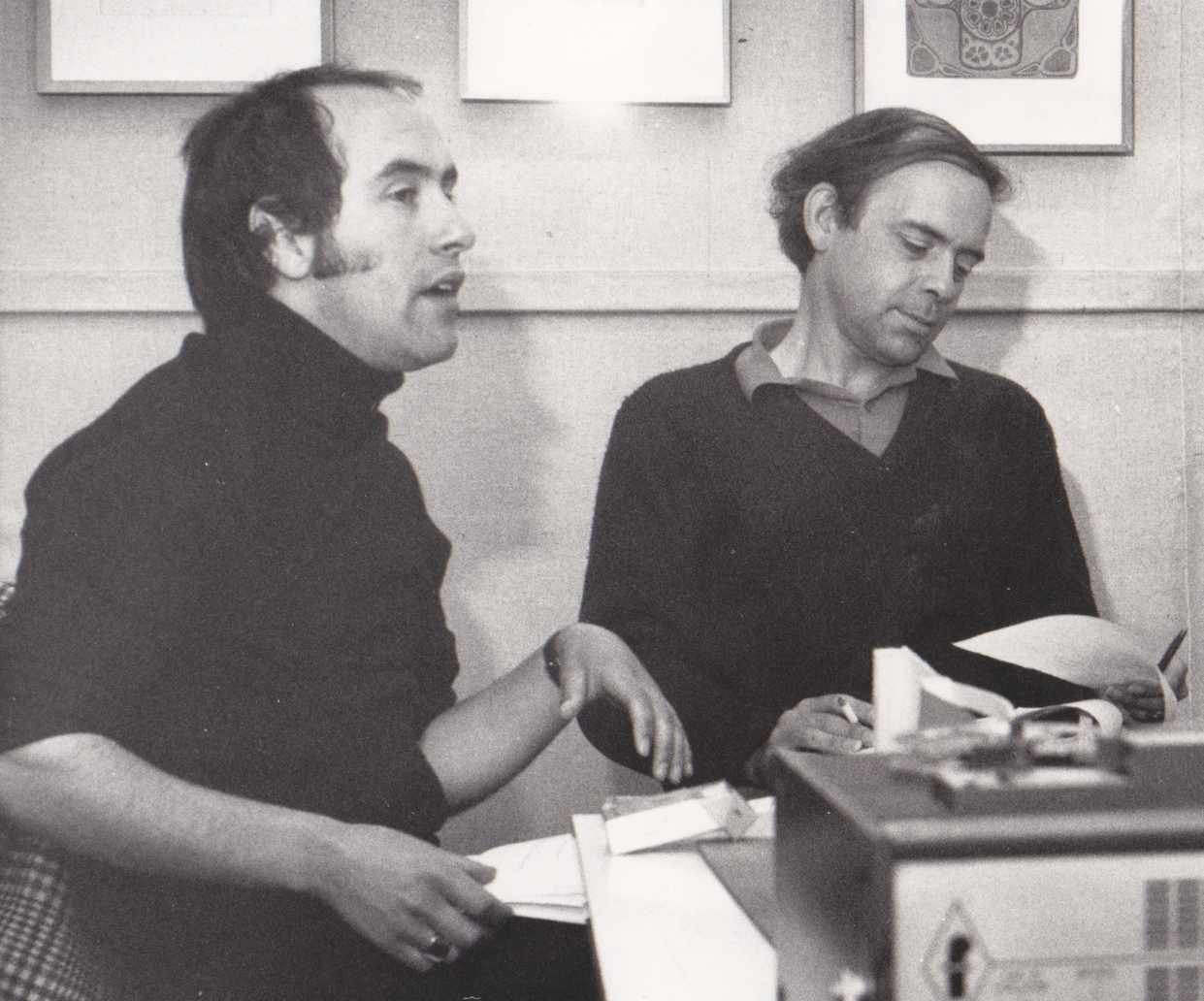
Malcolm Hebden (left) played Norris intermittently from 1994 to 2020.

Auditions were held for the part of Norris, with actor Malcolm Hebden going on to secure the role. After leaving the series in 1997, Hebden returned to filming with the series in 1999 and has remained on the show permanently until 2017. In 2009, it was noted that the character of Norris has become one of the show's most recognisable characters. Norris was written out along with several other characters as part of a large cast cull in 1997. However, the character was reintroduced two years later in 1999, on a more regular basis than previously. Hebden has said he is surprised by Norris having a fanbase, he said: "Norris is a very popular character in general though, and he's also very popular with children, which surprises me. I would have thought he'd get on our nerves, but he doesn't." He went on to say: "For some unknown reason, Norris is immensely popular with children, though I never understand why. Is he the granddad they've always wanted to poke fun at? He's always wrong, but most of my letters are from young people, which is lovely. I think they feel safe with him because he's a loser!".

=== Mary Taylor ===
In May 2009, it was announced that Patti Clare, who plays Mary Taylor, had been written out of the soap. A spokesperson for Coronation Street said: "The affected actors were all involved in storylines that were due to run for a finite time. If every new character stayed in the show, the Street would be a little crowded to say the least." It was then rumored that Clare would be returning; Hebden revealed these rumours were true. Hebden praised Mary and Norris, he said: "I think when Patti and I get together it's comedy all the way. We love working together which is a good start for comedy. Oddly enough, you can play a love relationship with someone you hate - I've done it - but comedy you can't do. So I love her to death and it helps with the comedy." Hebden also revealed that Mary should stay in the soap for good. In September 2009, it was announced Clare was to reprise her role as Mary. A spokesperson confirmed: "Mary will be back to rekindle her relationship with Norris." On 18 February 2010, it was announced that Norris would be held captive by Mary in a Misery-style storyline, speaking of the storyline a Coronation Street source told The Mirror: "Mary convinces herself they are reincarnations of Heathcliffe and Cathy and keeps trying to share his bed. Norris escapes to a phone box. When Mary arrives he tries to run and hide but falls and sprains his ankle. Mary refuses to take him to hospital and returns him to the cottage telling him, 'The more helpless you are the stronger I get'.

=== Ramsay Clegg ===
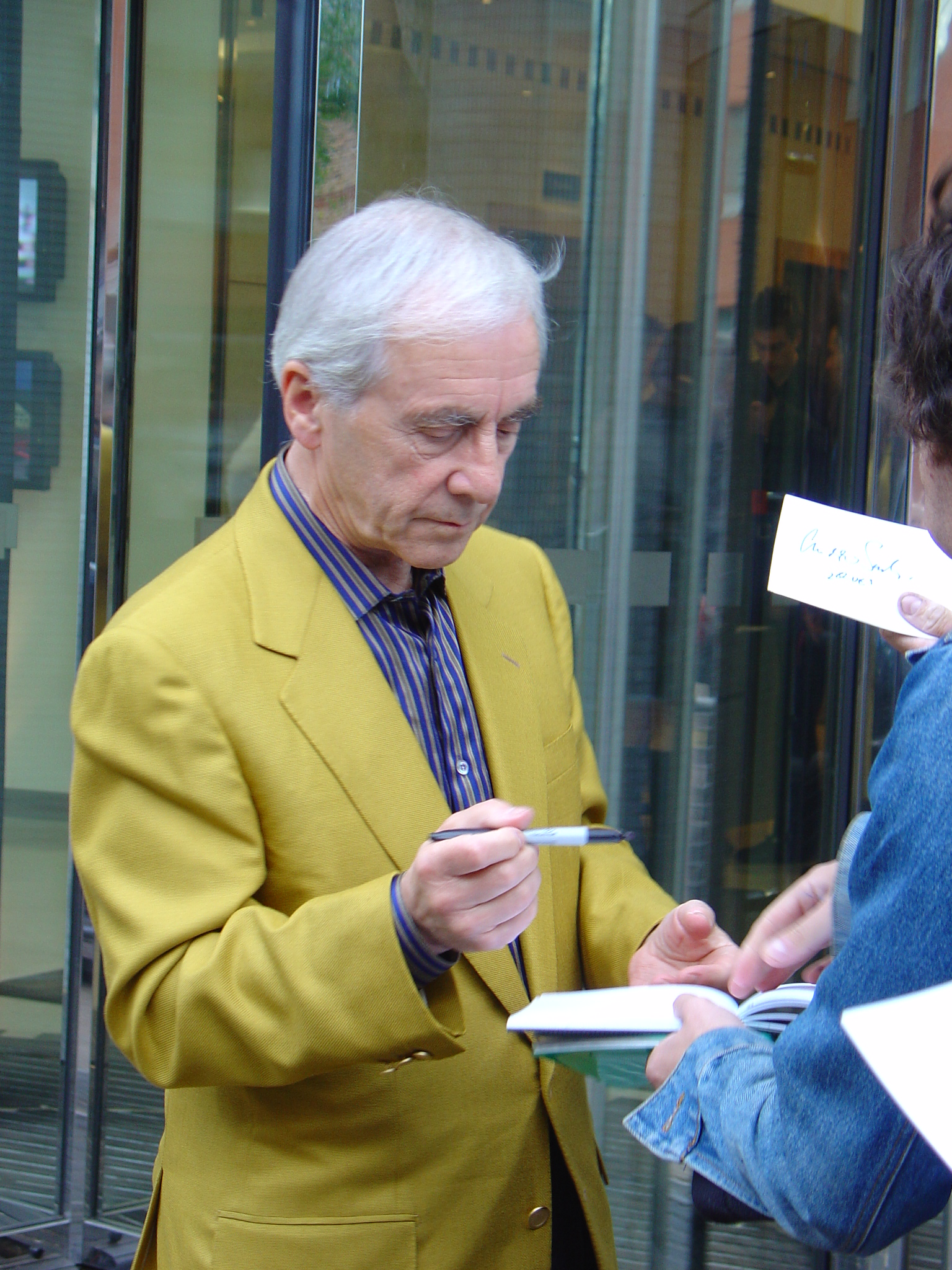
Andrew Sachs (pictured) was cast in the role of Ramsay Clegg.

On 5 January 2009, it was announced that former Fawlty Towers actor Andrew Sachs had been cast in Coronation Street to play Norris's half-brother, Ramsay Clegg. Sachs said that he had foreseen playing Ramsay five years before: "Myself and my wife had dreamt up a storyline where I played Norris's brother. We thought it would be great fun if a brother every bit as annoying as Norris turned up and the pair of them wound everyone up." Sachs also said that he nearly turned down the role "because I was too scared. I said to my wife that I didn't think I could do it. Apparently there is very little rehearsal time and I said I wasn't sure I liked the part anyway." Asked by Digital Spy "What's it been like working with Andrew Sachs for the past few months?", Malcolm Hebden replied: ""It was suggested two or three years ago that Andrew Sachs wanted to be my brother and because we had a change of perhaps two producers in that time, it just got lost in the hundreds of storylines we have. I was talking to our new producer Kim Crowther and said I thought it was a great shame we'd never picked up the Andrew Sachs stuff and she knew nothing of it. She thought it was a great idea and she made it happen. Andrew was very happy to do it." He also went on to say: "I had met Andrew once before and he expressed how keen he was to do it. We got on terribly well. I think it took him a little while to get used to my sense of humour but he did by the time he left! For me, the storyline kicks in once he's dead - that sounds awful - but I was just being dismissive and blocking Ramsay for the first part of the story. I just didn't want anything to do with him. Then Ramsay goes back to Australia and dies on the aeroplane but the fallout is enormous - not just for Norris, but particularly for Emily. She'd become quite fond of Ramsay. He's a civilised man and quite a charming character, whereas Norris isn't. Therefore, I'm going to be terribly unpopular for a little while until Norris realises that he was wrong."

=== Departure and returns ===
On 23 January 2018, it was reported that Hebden would not be seen onscreen for a short period after last appearing on screen in early December 2017. On 5 July 2018, Hebden revealed that he was recovering from a heart attack and had spent most of the previous December in an induced coma. In October 2018, while appearing on This Morning, Clare teased a possible return for Norris the following year. On 26 November 2018, Coronation Street officially confirmed Hebden's return as Norris, although Hebden won't be back on screen until May 2019, the ITV soap told Digital Spy that everyone is looking forward to his return. His return was described as being like a cameo, and the character will leave again, although the role will be left open for the actor to return. Hebden departed on 7 June 2019, but returned again for Ken Barlow's (William Roache) 80th birthday celebrations on 9 October 2019.

Norris returned briefly two months later during the episode that aired on 9 December 2019, and in 2020, he returned for a few stints before departing on 24 June, his final appearance. In January 2021, Hebden announced that he had retired the previous year, and stated that he will not be returning to Coronation Street. He stated that his "mind was willing" to return, but that acting took a physical strain on his body. It was also confirmed that Norris will still be referenced in scripts, and that his onscreen absence will be explained through Norris living at Stillwaters retirement home. In August 2021, it was announced that the character of Norris would be killed off and an on-screen funeral held.

== Storylines ==
Derek Wilton (Peter Baldwin) is surprised when Norris turns up; the man who gave him a lift home from the motorway service station when he missed the coach from London. He explains he's taken Derek's advice, left his wife and has come to stay. Derek's wife Mavis (Thelma Barlow) is put out as he keeps calling Derek "Dirk". Mavis doesn't want to throw Norris out as he might do Derek's morale some good. Derek tells Mavis that he's sure Norris will help him in his career.

Norris develops a reputation as a fusspot and a busybody, but his inquisitive nature sometimes works to advantage, as when he guessed that serial killer Richard Hillman (Brian Capron) was after Emily Bishop's (Eileen Derbyshire) money and wanted her dead. Only he and Audrey Roberts (Sue Nicholls) realised Richard's true nature, but no one believed them, and it was not until later that the full story emerged.

Rita Sullivan (Barbara Knox) employs Tina McIntyre (Michelle Keegan) to work at The Kabin, because Norris has back problems but Norris is unhappy about this. Later that month, Emily discovers ladies underwear in a bin bag of Norris's. Instantly suspicious, Tina and Rita confront Norris and ask if he is a transvestite. He explains that he had won the underwear in a competition and that he has an addiction to competitions. Norris' friend, Mary Taylor (Patti Clare), arrives on the Street; Mary was introduced for this specific storyline as she shares Norris' obsession with entering competitions. Norris initially resents Mary, as she often beats him in competitions, but they quickly become close, and Mary offers Norris a ticket she has won for a Cliff Richard concert. Norris' fellow lodger, Jed Stone (Kenneth Cope), enjoys flirting with Mary but she only has eyes for Norris. When Mary and Norris win a motor home, Norris is pleased, but begins to be concerned about how far Mary wants to take their relationship.

When Mary's mother dies, she is able to spend more time with Norris, but he remains unsure about their relationship. She then invites him to accompany her on a world cruise, paid for with her inheritance. Norris agrees but is nervous and is shocked by Rita's engagement to Colin Grimshaw (Edward de Souza), and the two share a poignant moment in The Rovers. Genuinely wishing each other well, it is clear that Norris still harbours thoughts of what might have been. He is a great support to Rita when she later calls off the engagement after discovering that Colin fathered a child with a fourteen-year-old girl.

Norris' half-brother, Ramsay Clegg (Andrew Sachs), arrives and hopes to make amends with Norris, who refuses to speak to him. Norris blames Ramsay for their mother's death, stating that the shock of his reappearance in her life caused her demise. Despite Ramsay's best efforts at a reconciliation, Norris refuses to see him as anything other than an illegitimate half-brother and Ramsay eventually returns to Australia. Norris is left reeling at the news that Ramsay died on the flight; he had an incurable brain tumour, which he never told Norris about. Some of Ramsay's possessions are left to Norris and amongst them is a letter written by their mother, who cruelly rejected Ramsay. Norris is left devastated that he had blamed Ramsay all along. After Ramsay's death, Rita decides to sell up The Kabin. When Norris receives £172,000 from Ramsay's will, he buys The Kabin from Rita.

When Norris shows signs of tiredness, Mary suggests that she does some work in the Kabin so he can take a break. She enters a competition for them to win a week at a cottage in the countryside and wins, persuading Norris to come with her. Norris realises that Mary is trying to ensure that he cannot leave the cottage and even hears Mary mention the idea of them getting married; a horrific thought for Norris. She then breaks his glasses, leaving him more or less housebound, as his eyesight is quite poor. He attempts to escape from the cottage but Mary tracks him down. Eventually, he contacts the police telling them that Mary is holding him captive. No charges are brought against her, and Norris subsequently makes up with her.

Norris is not pleased when Emily allows Tracy Barlow (Kate Ford) and her daughter Amy (Elle Mulvaney) to live with them. When Tracy offers to clean the house for Emily, Norris puts a lock on his bedroom door so that Tracy cannot get into his room. Tracy locks Norris in his room as a joke, and he is annoyed when Amy spills paint on his shoes and tells Emily that he wants Tracy to move out. Emily agrees after Tracy ruins Ernest Bishop's (Stephen Hancock) old dancing shoes, thinking that they belonged to Norris.

Norris becomes supportive to Mary after finding out she was raped in her teenage years and conceived a son, whom her mother forced her to give up. Norris and several residents help Mary find her son Jude Appleton (Paddy Wallace), who turns up to visit her. Mary wants to make contact with Jude again, so her and Norris decide to get married and invite Jude and his wife, Angie (Victoria Ekanoye) and their baby son, George (Romeo Cheetham-Karcz), to the wedding. Norris goes through with the marriage to Mary although Jude and Angie find out they only did it to see them, and the pair of them decide to remain.

Norris leaves to stay with Emily in Edinburgh following her return from volunteering with her nephew Spider in Peru He sells The Kabin to Brian Packham (Peter Gunn) and Cathy Matthews (Melanie Hill), to the fury of Rita. On 7 June 2019, after a final drink at the Rovers with his friends, Norris leaves Coronation Street for Scotland with Emily's niece Freda Burgess. As the taxi drives away, Norris reminisces about his time on the street and says he will miss it and all the people on it. In 2020, Norris and Freda move into Stillwaters, a gated retirement community and are joined by Ken Barlow (William Roache) and Claudia Colby (Rula Lenska) for a short time. The following year, Norris makes contact with Rita and Ken via text message with an important announcement; However, when Ken calls Norris, a Paramedic answers and tells him Norris is being rushed to hospital following a suspected stroke. Ken, Rita and Mary arrive at the hospital, only to be told by Freda that Norris has died. Norris’ funeral took place on 24 September 2021.

== Reception ==
Malcolm Hebden was nominated for "Best Comedy Performance" for his portrayal of Norris at The British Soap Awards 2002. Hebden was also nominated for "Funniest Performance" at the 2010 Inside Soap Awards.

== In other media ==
A trailer for promotion of the Coronation Street website on ITV, which was released in July 2009 to air on television, portrays Norris as James Bond, using high-tech devices to spy on many of his neighbours, in reference to his character's curiosity to know everyone's business in the street.
