= Brian Park =

Scottish television producer

Brian Park is a Scottish television producer and executive.

== Early life and education ==
He was born in Fife but lived in the Aberdeen suburb of Bucksburn between the ages of nine and 17. He acted when he was a child and joined the Aberdeen Children’s Theatre at the age of 13, appearing in an episode of Dr Finlay’s Casebook.

== Career ==
Park joined Granada Television after graduating from Edinburgh University. He rose through the television ranks and, after leaving for a two-year spell with Tyne Tees Television, he returned to Granada in 1992 as head of entertainment where he produced the award-winning Prime Suspect, September Song and the pilot for My Wonderful Life.

In 1997, Park was appointed executive producer of the long-running soap opera Coronation Street following a decline in its ratings. Park became known as the "axeman" in the popular press after he sanctioned the removal of several long-running characters from Coronation Street, including Andy McDonald (Nicholas Cochrane), Bill Webster (Peter Armitage) and Maureen Holdsworth (Sherrie Hewson). During Park's reign, three characters Derek Wilton (Peter Baldwin), Don Brennan (Geoffrey Hinsliff) and Des Barnes (Philip Middlemiss) were killed off. Mavis Wilton (Thelma Barlow) left the programme in 1997, although this was due to Barlow's intention to leave. During 1997 and 1998, he introduced more sensational storylines such as Deirdre Rachid (Anne Kirkbride)'s wrongful imprisonment. A range of new characters were introduced such as soap’s first transgender woman, Hayley Cropper (Julie Hesmondhalgh) and the Battersby family, in a bid to capture a younger audience and reinvent the show. Some of his storylines were ratings successes while others were criticised for being unrealistic and sensationalist. He left the role after one year.

Park left Coronation Street in 1998 to start Shed Productions with Coronation Street script executive Ann McManus, which produced TV shows such as Bad Girls, Waterloo Road and Footballers Wives. Park was also producer on the Channel 5 soap Family Affairs, overseeing a revamp of the show that included killing off the entire Hart family in a canal boat explosion.

== Personal life ==
In 2009, Park had a brain aneurysm while holidaying in Italy and underwent brain surgery.
