= List of Coronation Street characters introduced in 1995 =

The following is a list of characters that first appeared in the ITV soap opera Coronation Street in 1995, by order of first appearance.

== Daniel Osbourne ==
Daniel Osbourne
- Coronation Street character
- Portrayed by: Lewis Harney (1995–1997); Dominic Holmes (2007); Rob Mallard (2016–present)
- Duration: 1995–1997, 2007, 2016–present
- First appearance: Episode 3800; 4 January 1995
- Introduced by: Sue Pritchard (1995); Steve November (2007); Kate Oates (2016)
In-universe information
- Occupation: Teacher
- Father: Ken Barlow
- Mother: Denise Osbourne
- Half-brothers: Lawrence Cunningham; Peter Barlow
- Half-sisters: Susan Barlow; Tracy Barlow (adoptive)
- Wife: Sinead Tinker (2018–2019)
- Sons: Bertie Osbourne
- Grandfathers: Frank Barlow
- Grandmothers: Ida Barlow
- Uncles: David Barlow
- Aunts: Alison Dunkley
- Nephews: James Cunningham; Adam Barlow; Simon Barlow
- Nieces: Chloe Cunningham; Amy Barlow (adoptive)
- Other relatives: Nancy Leathers

Daniel Osbourne is the son of established character Ken Barlow (William Roache) and Denise Osbourne (Denise Black). Daniel was originally portrayed by Lewis Harney from his birth in 1995 until he left with his mother in 1997. Upon his return in 2007, the character was portrayed by Dominic Holmes. The character was recast in 2016, with Rob Mallard taking over the role.

Daniel was first introduced after being born on 4 January 1995 to Ken Barlow and Denise Osbourne. Daniel appears again in May 2007 when he agreed to meet his father. At the time, Daniel's interests included heavy metal and football. He and Ken initially got on well, but Daniel begins to resent Ken's presence after he begins staying with him and Denise, to the extent of Daniel telling a friend that Ken is his grandfather. Ken eventually returns to his wife Deirdre (Anne Kirkbride), leaving Daniel and Denise alone once again. In the intervening years, Daniel is mentioned and Ken occasionally visits him.

In November 2016, Daniel returns again by visiting Ken in hospital following his stroke. Peter, Tracy and Susan's son Adam Barlow (Sam Robertson) visit Ken in hospital. They meet Daniel, who reveals he is Ken's son. Daniel joins his family for a meal and meets Peter's son Simon Barlow (Alex Bain) and Tracy's daughter Amy Barlow (Elle Mulvaney). Daniel draws up a rota for Ken's care when he comes home. Daniel is suspected of stealing Adam's car when Tracy and Adam visit his flat and find student debts. Daniel reveals that Denise left him when he was 15 and struggled paying the bills. Daniel has to move out of his flat and admits he doesn't know of Denise's whereabouts, so he reports her to the police as missing. In early 2017, Daniel begins to develop romantic feelings for local resident Sinead Tinker (Katie McGlynn) – who is in a relationship with her boyfriend Chesney Brown (Sam Aston), even though she wishes to end it. Daniel begins revising with Sinead when she has to work overtime at the factory, and the following day he is mortified when Adam realises that he is still a virgin. That night, however, Daniel and Sinead have sex in the factory store room. Adam reveals this to Chesney, who confronts Daniel at his house, and resulting in Sinead embarking on a relationship with Daniel. Sinead is later stunned to learn that she has fallen pregnant with Daniel's baby, however Daniel assumes that Chesney is the father. They initially agree to have the pregnancy terminated, however after the couple have a heart-to-heart, Sinead and Daniel agree to keep their unborn child. Ken, having learned that Daniel has been accepted onto a Masters program at Oxford University and fearing that fatherhood will interfere with his studies, persuades Sinead to have the termination after all. Sinead tells Daniel that she had a miscarriage, but when she feels unwell and Daniel calls for a doctor she admits to having an abortion. Daniel is devastated and ends the relationship.

Later that night, Ken is pushed down the stairs by an unknown assailant (see Who Attacked Ken?), and Daniel returns home to find his landlord Pat Phelan (Connor McIntyre) standing over Ken's lifeless body. Ken is then rushed to hospital where Daniel, Sinead, with whom Daniel has reunited, and the other Barlows are told that Ken fell down the stairs as a result of being struck over the head with a blunt instrument, and that it will now be treated as an attempted murder investigation. Adam soon finds himself prime suspect and is desperate to shift the blame to anybody else. He kidnaps Daniel en route to one of his university examinations and tries unsuccessfully to make him confess. When Adam persuades the police to interview Sinead again, he is shaken when Daniel threatens to kill him. When Ken later apologises to Sinead at the flat over the abortion, he notices Daniel's red shoes and believes that he is his attacker. However Ken later notices similar red shoes in Adam's belongings, and so Adam is subsequently arrested and charged with the attack. However, Daniel later returns home and retrieves a bloodstained poetry book, and is thus revealed as the real culprit.

Unaware of this, Ken goes to stay with Daniel to help him revise for his remaining examinations and to redecorate his old flat. Daniel is reluctant about, especially when Ken asks specifically about the poetry book that Daniel used to hit him with. The following week Daniel tries to persuade Ken to tell the police that he simply lost his balance and fell down the stairs, but when the conversation moves to Denise, Daniel becomes furious. While Ken goes for a walk, Daniel is shown to be self-harming with a small knife. During his walk, Ken uncovers Denise's belongings buried in the garden and becomes convinced that Daniel has murdered his mother. Upon his return, Daniel reveals that it was he who pushed Ken in his fury at Denise's disappearance and Sinead's termination. As their confrontation turns physical, both Ken and Daniel are stunned when Denise unexpectedly returns. Meanwhile, Sinead and Chesney have found the poetry book in the flat and alerted the police, who arrive and arrest Daniel.

Daniel is released from custody after Ken tells the police that he tripped and fell down the stairs, but is shunned when Peter, Adam and Tracy learn the truth. Despite the turmoil Daniel nevertheless obtains his degree, though without the high distinction that had been expected of him. Denise temporarily moves in with Daniel after Sinead moves out, but after overhearing her say how blissful her life was with no responsibilities, Daniel throws her out of the flat. After rejection from Sinead and a confrontation with Tracy, Daniel purchases cocaine from a drug dealer and overdoses with the drugs and alcohol. He is found and rushed to hospital by Adam and Robert Preston (Tristan Gemmill) who plead with Daniel to seek professional help regarding his mental health. Daniel later joins forces with a newspaper journalist, Cindy Watson (Esther Hall) to expose Phelan's wrongdoings. However, when Phelan catches the pair having sex he arranges a violent confrontation between Daniel and the journalist's jealous husband, thus warning Daniel against further interference.

Of his casting, Mallard said, "It feels great to be starting work on Coronation Street and I'm looking forward to getting to know everyone. I grew up watching Coronation Street, so the chance to be in it, especially playing a part like Daniel, is very exciting". Producer Kate Oates said Daniel "is a different Barlow altogether, more sensitive and bookish, he is clearly a chip off the old block, but there is more to Ken's youngest son than meets the eye. Rob is a talented young actor who is perfect for the role." In August 2017, Mallard was longlisted for Best Newcomer at the Inside Soap Awards. He made the viewer-voted shortlist, but lost out to his co-star Julia Goulding, who portrays Shona Ramsey.

== Elsie Duckworth ==
Elsie Duckworth
- Coronation Street character
- Portrayed by: Ursula Jones
- Appears on: 6 January 1995
- Introduced by: Sue Pritchard
In-universe information
- Brothers: Harold Baxter
- Husband: Clifford Duckworth

Elsie Duckworth (née Baxter) was the wife of Clifford Duckworth (Dave King), and sister-in-law of Jack Duckworth (Bill Tarmey).

Cliff walks out on Elsie just before Christmas 1994 to stay at No. 9 Coronation Street and reconnect with Jack. However, Elsie tracks him down and, shortly after New Year's Day 1995, barges her way into the Duckworth household. Cliff, having told Jack and his wife Vera (Liz Dawn) that he too was married to a Vera, is shocked. When Elsie introduces herself, Vera says: "I thought you were Vera?" to which Elsie replies, "No, you're Vera!" before dragging Cliff home, with Cliff pathetically promising to keep in touch.

Jack is mortified to hear that, in June 1995, Cliff and Elsie have been killed in a car accident abroad. Vera, who has prayed for money the previous day, is guilt-ridden. Jack and Vera inherit £30,000 from the couple's holiday insurance.

== Josie Clarke ==
Josie Clarke
- Coronation Street character
- Portrayed by: Ellie Haddington
- Duration: 1995–1996
- First appearance: 16 January 1995
- Last appearance: 16 August 1996
- Introduced by: Sue Pritchard

Josie Clarke is played by Ellie Haddington. Josie makes her first on-screen appearance on 16 January 1995, as a taxi fare of Don Brennan's (Geoffrey Hinsliff). Don and Josie begin dating and eventually move in together. However, money troubles and Don's bouts of depression and erratic behaviour force the couple apart and Josie sells the garage to Kevin Webster (Michael Le Vell) before leaving Weatherfield.

== Ashley Peacock ==
Ashley Peacock was played by Steven Arnold. The character first appeared onscreen during the episode airing on 1 February 1995. On 23 April 2010, it was announced that the character had been axed along with his on-screen family by new producer Phil Collinson. Ashley was a victim of the tram crash and died as part of the show's 50th birthday in December 2010.

== Maxine Peacock ==
Maxine Heavey (also Peacock) first appears in May 1995 as a college friend of Fiona Middleton's (Angela Griffin), working in Denise Osbourne's (Denise Black) salon. She is very much a good-time girl and has relationships, often one-night stands, with several men, including Curly Watts (Kevin Kennedy) when she is drunk.

== Billy Williams ==
Billy Williams
- Coronation Street character
- Portrayed by: Frank Mills
- Duration: 1995–1997
- First appearance: 8 May 1995
- Last appearance: 14 February 1997
- Introduced by: Sue Pritchard
In-universe information
- Wife: Betty Turpin (1995–1997)

Billy Williams was Betty Turpin's (Betty Driver) wartime sweetheart, and during a party at The Rovers Return Inn to celebrate the fiftieth anniversary of VE Day in 1995, he met up with Betty again. Billy proposed to Betty, and later that year; they were married with Betty's son Gordon Clegg (Bill Kenwright) giving his mother away. Billy, along with Jack Duckworth (Bill Tarmey), Fred Elliott (John Savident), Don Brennan (Geoffrey Hinsliff) and Alf Roberts (Bryan Mosley) was one of the shareholders in the racehorse Betty's Hotshot. In November 1997, Billy died of a heart attack, leaving Betty widowed after just two years of marriage.

== Leo Firman ==
Leo Firman
- Coronation Street character
- Portrayed by: John Elmes
- First appearance: 18 August 1995
- Last appearance: 6 November 1995
- Introduced by: Sue Pritchard
In-universe information
- Occupation: Retail Manager
- Uncles: Eric Firman

Leo Firman, portrayed by John Elmes, was the nephew of the chairman of Firman's Freezers, Eric Firman (Malcolm Terris). Eric appointed Leo as the shop manager of the Weatherfield branch. Whilst he was there, he sexually harassed a shop worker, Anne Malone (Eve Steele) before his attentions turned to Raquel Wolstenhulme (Sarah Lancashire), whom he attempted to rape. Raquel confided in her boss, Curly Watts (Kevin Kennedy) who bravely reported Leo. Leo was subsequently fired by Eric.

== Anne Malone ==
Anne Malone
- Coronation Street character
- Portrayed by: Eve Steele
- Duration: 1995–1998
- First appearance: 8 September 1995
- Last appearance: 11 October 1998
- Introduced by: Sue Pritchard
In-universe information
- Occupation: Assistant manager of Firman's Freezer Centre
- Father: Ed Malone
- Mother: Sarah Malone

Anne Malone is the former supervisor of Firman's Freezer Centre and is later promoted to the position of assistant manager. She develops a crush on her manager, Curly Watts (Kevin Kennedy), but dates and lives with Andy McDonald (Nicholas Cochrane) for a short time. Anne complains of sexual harassment by Leo Firman to her superior Reg Holdsworth (Ken Morley), who is reluctant to report his boss's nephew.

Curly rejects Anne's advances, so she sets out on a vendetta to destroy Curly's life. One of her attempts at revenge is to pour WD-40 on fish fingers stored inside Freshco's supermarket's freezer. However, her plans backfire fatally when a security guard unknowingly locks her inside the freezer after seeing the door is open. Anne subsequently freezes to death and her body is discovered the following morning.

== Gary Mallett ==
Gary Mallett
- Coronation Street character
- Portrayed by: Ian Mercer
- Duration: 1995–2000
- First appearance: 2 October 1995
- Last appearance: 1 October 2000
- Introduced by: Sue Pritchard
In-universe information
- Father: Peter Mallett
- Brothers: Shane Mallett
- Wife: Judy Smedley (1993–1999)
- Sons: William Mallett
- Daughters: Rebecca Mallett
- Adoptive daughters: Shannon Tattersall (legal)

Gary Mallett is played by Ian Mercer. He moves to Weatherfield with his wife, Judy (Gaynor Faye), on 2 October 1995, after buying Jack and Vera Duckworth's house. She and Gary are happy together, but Judy longs for a child. Sadly, nothing happened so when she meets Zoe Tattersall (Joanne Froggatt), a young woman who was considering giving her baby up for adoption, Judy convinces Zoe to allow her and Gary to buy the baby for £2000, as well as putting Gary's name on the birth certificate to ensure parental rights. Zoe later has a girl whom Judy and Gary name Katie Joyce; however, Zoe regrets her decision and soon takes Katie back and renames her Shannon. Judy and Gary are heartbroken by this, and this did not improve when Shannon died of meningitis a few months later. Eventually, Judy discovers that she is pregnant and is thrilled to discover that she is expecting twins. On 25 December 1998, she gives birth to Rebecca and William Mallett. Nine months later, Judy collapses in the backyard and dies after suffering a pulmonary embolism caused by injuries sustained in a road accident caused by Terry Duckworth (Nigel Pivaro). When Terry arrives at his parents', Jack (Bill Tarmey) and Vera Duckworth's (Liz Dawn), B&B on Christmas Day, Gary punches him and blames him for Judy's death. The following year, Gary decides to leave Weatherfield with Rebecca and William on 1 October 2000. They move to Blackpool to live with Gary's new girlfriend Paula Shipley (Joanne Rowden) and her son Warren (Dean Worswick), selling the house back to Jack and Vera Duckworth.

== Judy Mallett ==
Judy Mallett
- Coronation Street character
- Portrayed by: Gaynor Faye
- Duration: 1995–1999
- First appearance: 2 October 1995
- Last appearance: 26 September 1999
- Introduced by: Sue Pritchard
In-universe information
- Mother: Joyce Smedley
- Husband: Gary Mallett (1993–1999)
- Sons: William Mallett
- Daughters: Rebecca Mallett

Judy Mallett (also Smedley) was played by Gaynor Faye from October 1995 until September 1999.

She moves to Weatherfield with her husband, Gary (Ian Mercer) in October 1995 after buying Jack and Vera Duckworth's house. She and Gary are happy together, but Judy longs for a child. Sadly, nothing happened so when she meets Zoe Tattersall (Joanne Froggatt), a young woman who was considering giving her baby up for adoption, Judy convinces Zoe to allow her and Gary to adopt the baby, a girl whom she and Gary name Katie Joyce. Zoe, however, regrets her decision and soon takes Katie back and renames her Shannon. Judy and Gary are heartbroken by this, and this does not improve when Shannon dies of meningitis a few months later. Eventually, Judy discovers that she is pregnant and is thrilled to discover that she is expecting twins. On 25 December 1998, she gives birth to Rebecca and William Mallett.

Judy dies in her backyard whilst hanging out the washing on 24 September 1999, the victim of a pulmonary embolism that developed as a result of an injury she sustained to her leg in a road accident caused by Terry Duckworth (Nigel Pivaro).

== Brian Dunkley ==
Brian Dunkley
- Coronation Street character
- Portrayed by: Benny Young
- Duration: 1995–1996
- First appearance: 6 November 1995
- Last appearance: 24 November 1996
- Introduced by: Sue Pritchard (1995)
In-universe information
- Occupation: Accountant
- Wife: Alsion Dunkley

Brian Dunkley was the husband of Alison Dunkley (Maggie Saunders).

He started a two-year affair with his sister-in-law, Denise Osbourne (Denise Black). when the affair was exposed it made Brian and Denise flee to Scotland. Denise originally left her son Daniel Osbourne (Lewis Harney) with his father, Ken Barlow (William Roache), however, Brian and Denise came back to take Daniel.

in 2007, it is revealed that Denise and Brian are no longer together, with Denise and Daniel Moving back down to the Manchester area.

== Alison Dunkley ==
Alison Dunkley
- Coronation Street character
- Portrayed by: Maggie Saunders
- Duration: 1995–1996
- First appearance: 6 November 1995
- Last appearance: 24 January 1996
- Introduced by: Sue Pritchard (1995)
In-universe information
- Occupation: Teacher
- Father: Roy
- Mother: Irene
- Sisters: Denise Osbourne
- Husband: Brian Dunkley
- Nephews: Daniel Osbourne
- Other relatives: Bertie Osbourne

Alison Dunkley was the wife of Brian Dunkley (Benny Young) and sister to Denise Osbourne (Denise Black).

Alison is oblivious until it is revealed that her husband Brian, had been having an affair with her sister Denise for almost two years. When Alison discovered that the pair were leaving for Scotland she begged Ken Barlow (William Roache) to take Denise back as she still wanted to be with Brian, however, Ken refused.

Ken visited Alison in January 1997, Ken asks her to testify in his favor in a custody hearing over Daniel Osbourne (Lewis Harney), however she was still a nervous wreck from the betrayal of her husband and sister and refused to see Denise and Brian again in any capacity.

== Tony Horrocks ==
Tony Horrocks
- Coronation Street character
- Portrayed by: Lee Warburton
- Duration: 1995–1998
- First appearance: 22 November 1995
- Last appearance: 11 December 1998
- Introduced by: Sue Pritchard (1995); Brian Park (1998)
In-universe information
- Occupation: Mechanic
- Father: Nick Horrocks
- Mother: Natalie Horrocks
- Stepfather: Des Barnes (1998)
- Half-sisters: Laura Horrocks
- Aunts: Debs Brownlow

Tony Horrocks is a young mechanic who starts working as Kevin Webster's (Michael Le Vell) apprentice at MVB motors. In July 1996, Tony nearly goes into partnership with Don Brennan (Geoffrey Hinsliff), who buys the garage from Mike Baldwin (Johnny Briggs). Tony's father, Nick (William Ilkley), offers to lend Tony the money to buy into the business, but he withdraws his offer when he sees the books and Don's financial problems.

Tony begins dating Fiona Middleton (Angela Griffin) and is angry when she visits her ex-boyfriend, Steve McDonald (Simon Gregson), in prison. He then dates her colleague Maxine Heavey (Tracy Shaw) but it does not last long. Tony also hands in his notice at the garage after arguing with Don.

Tony goes to work at the local exhaust centre and is joined by his friend and former colleague, Kevin, when the garage goes bust. In August 1996, Don's former business partner and girlfriend Josie Clarke (Ellie Haddington) sells the garage to Kevin and Tony for £25,000 and they become business partners. In December 1996, Tony begins dating a girl called Jill, who is one of Maxine's friends whom he met at Fiona's 21st birthday.

In February 1997, Tony runs over and kills Joyce Smedley (Anita Carey) in his car after she runs in front of him while walking her dog. Tony is racked with guilt, and states he is never going to drive again and insists to his father that he takes his car to the wreckers for him.

Tony then sells his share of the garage to his mother Natalie (Denise Welch) and bids farewell to Kevin before moving to Leeds. Off-screen, Tony becomes involved in drug dealing after suffering financial problems. He returns in October 1998 for Natalie's wedding to Des Barnes (Philip Middlemiss), before leaving again. The following month, he arrives on Natalie's doorstep asking her for help. A gang of drug dealers of Jez Quigley's, to whom Tony owes money. arrive at Natalie's house and attack Tony in the living room. Des arrives home and comes across the fight. He goes to help his stepson Tony, but is severely beaten by the gang. Des later dies of a heart attack. After leaving in December 1998, Tony is never seen onscreen again.

In March 2000, Tony's badly decomposed corpse (originally believed to be that of a victim of a local serial killer some 100 years earlier) is found in a cellar by Natalie's then boyfriend Vinny Sorrell (James Gaddas) on a building site where he was working. He had been beaten to death by drug dealer Jez Quigley (Lee Boardman) sometime during the previous 15 months. Jez himself finally dies six months later after being attacked by Jim McDonald (Charles Lawson) in revenge for beating up Jim's son, Steve. Natalie is left guilt-ridden because his stepfather died defending him.

== Others ==
Character	Date(s)	Episode(s)	Actor	Circumstances
Peter Clegg	18–20 October	3923–3924	Uncredited	Peter is the son of Gordon (Bill Kenwright) and Caroline Clegg (Sarah Thurstan). He is born off-screen in 1985 in Wimbledon. Peter attends the wedding of his grandmother, Betty Turpin (Betty Driver) to Billy Williams (Frank Mills) in October 1995 with his parents.
