= Hinsliff =

Hinsliff is a surname. Notable people with the surname include:

- Gaby Hinsliff (born 1971), English journalist and columnist
- Geoffrey Hinsliff (1937–2024), English actor
