= List of Coronation Street characters introduced in 1974 =

In 1974, several new characters were added to the British television soap opera Coronation Street. Some of them only appeared for a few episodes, but Gail Potter (later Gail Tilsley, Platt, Hillman, McIntyre, Rodwell and Chadwick) became one of the show's longest-running characters.

== Sir Julius Berlin ==
Sir Julius Berlin
- Coronation Street character
- Portrayed by: Leonard Sachs
- Duration: 1974
- First appearance: 6 May 1974
- Last appearance: 13 May 1974
- Introduced by: Susi Hush

Sir Julius Berlin was played by Leonard Sachs. Sir Julius appeared in Coronation Street during 1974 as the boss of the Mark Brittain mail order warehouse that was situated in the Street.

When the residents complained about the lorries passing through, Ken Barlow spoke to Sir Julius about the problem. Sir Julius was so impressed by Ken that he offered him a job as executive administrative assistant. Meanwhile, the workers at the warehouse threatened to strike due to Sir Julius trying to keep his staff out of a trade union, until Ken persuaded Sir Julius to accept the union. Sir Julius upset workers Ivy Tilsley and Vera Duckworth because the company announced all women over sixty had to retire. They called the union in but the union supported lowering the retirement age. After the warehouse fire in 1975, Sir Julius (who had not appeared since May 1974) dissolved the company.

== Martin Downes ==
Martin Downes
- Coronation Street character
- Portrayed by: Louis Selwyn
- First appearance: 1 July 1974
- Last appearance: 3 July 1974
- Introduced by: Susi Hush
In-universe information
- Father: Joe Mason
- Mother: Bet Lynch
- Grandfathers: Patrick Lynch
- Grandmothers: Mary Lynch
- Uncles: Lenny Lynch
- Aunts: Tina Lynch

Martin Andrew Downes (also Lynch) is the son of Bet Lynch whom she gave up for adoption when she was 16. One day Martin arrives at the Rovers knowing his mother is a barmaid who works there, and soon realizes she is Bet. However he is repulsed by her overt sexual nature and leaves without telling her who he is. Nine months later, Bet receives news from one of Martin's army colleagues that he has died in action in Ulster. The news devastated her and she briefly considered suicide, but was talked out of it by Eddie Yeats.

== Idris Hopkins ==
Idris Hopkins
- Coronation Street character
- Portrayed by: Richard Davies
- Duration: 1974–1975
- First appearance: 8 July 1974
- Last appearance: 10 February 1975
- Introduced by: H. V. Kershaw
In-universe information
- Occupation: Foundry worker
- Father: Cledwin Hopkins
- Mother: Megan Hopkins
- Wife: Vera Hopkins
- Daughters: Tricia Hopkins

Idris Hopkins, his wife Vera and their daughter Tricia moved to Coronation Street to take over the tenancy of the Corner Shop in 1974. Idris, a Welshman, was a quiet man, satisfied with what life had thrown at him. Weary of working night shifts, and of the noise in Coronation Street, Idris frequently had to make peace between Vera and his domineering mother Megan, who moved into the Corner Shop accommodation with Idris and Vera.

Idris was never as involved with the grand plans of the family as Vera or (especially) Granny Hopkins. He spent most of his time slumped in his chair or working nights. He barely registered the trouble Granny was giving shop owner Gordon Clegg and his mother Betty Turpin, but when he found out he tried to exclude her from the family's plans to buy the shop from Gordon. When Granny persisted, hoping to buy the shop for a cheaper price, Gordon evicted the family, and they disappeared during the night, never to be seen in Coronation Street again (except for Tricia).

== Carlos ==
Carlos was played by Malcolm Hebden for 10 episodes between 1974 and 1975. He was introduced as the Spanish lover of Mavis Wilton (Thelma Barlow). Hebden later returned to the soap as Norris Cole, which he portrayed on-off between 1994 and 2020.

In 2023, Ryan Paton from Liverpool Echo reported how viewers of the soap found Carlos to be quite different from Norris, which he partially believed was due to Carlos having a Spanish accent, which Norris did not have.

== Gail Platt ==
Gail Platt (also Potter, Tilsley, Hillman, McIntyre, Rodwell and Chadwick), played by Helen Worth, is one of the longest-running characters on the show. Last appeared on 25 December 2024.

== Vera Duckworth ==
Vera Duckworth (also Burton), played by Liz Dawn, first appearing in August 1974 and last appearing in the 6,734th episode on 18 January 2008, where the character peacefully died in her sleep at the age of 70 from heart failure. Her funeral was held on 22 January 2008. She reappeared posthumously for a single appearance on the 8 November 2010 episode, in which her husband Jack (Bill Tarmey) died.

== Blanche Hunt ==
Blanche Hunt (née Linfield) was originally played by Patricia Cutts; however, the actress committed suicide after appearing in just two episodes in 1974. Maggie Jones took over the role, playing Blanche in over 830 episodes from 1974 to her death in 2009. The character subsequently died off screen in 2010. Blanche was the mother of Deirdre Barlow, grandmother of Tracy Barlow and great-grandmother of Amy. Her storylines have revolved around her family life, various romances and her "acerbic tongue". The character's "gallows humour" has been well received by critics, and saw Jones win The British Soap Award for "Best Comedy Performance" in 2005 and 2008. Blanche has been described as "a true Coronation Street icon".
