= Derek Wilton =

Fictional character from Coronation Street

- Coronation Street character
- Portrayed by: Peter Baldwin
- Duration: 1976–1979, 1982, 1984–1997
- First appearance: 23 February 1976
- Last appearance: 7 April 1997
- Created by: Bill Podmore
- Spin-off appearances: A Christmas Corrie (2012)
In-universe information
- Occupation: Salesman
- Father: Lionel Wilton
- Mother: Amy Wilton
- Sisters: Edith Wilton; Doreen Wilton
- Wife: Angela Hawthorne (1985–1988); Mavis Riley (1988–1997)
- First cousins: Norah

Derek Wilton is a fictional character from the British ITV soap opera Coronation Street, portrayed by Peter Baldwin. He appeared in the show intermittently between 1976 and 1987, before becoming a regular from 1988 until the character's death in 1997.

== Creation and development ==
=== Mavis Riley ===
In 1976, Derek was introduced as a love interest for Mavis Riley (Thelma Barlow), but it was more than a decade before the couple finally married in 1988, after simultaneously jilting each other four years earlier.

Richard Dyer perceives the Mavis and Derek characters to be as "shy physically" as one another, whereas Kathryn Hone, writing in The Sunday Times, considers Derek "even more dithering than Mavis". Nevertheless the on-screen relationship between the couple progresses quickly, despite the interference of Derek's mother. Actors Peter Baldwin and Thelma Barlow had worked together before their casting as Derek and Mavis, and the two became close friends.

Derek and Mavis have been described by What's on TV as "an old-fashioned pair who were made for each other", and were typically featured in comic storylines, such as one in 1995 that saw their garden gnome kidnapped and transported around the world; Derek and Mavis received pictures of the gnome in various exotic locations, sent to them with ransom notes. It transpired that the kidnapper was Derek's friend Norris Cole (Malcolm Hebden). The Daily Record labelled this storyline one of "Coronation Street's Classic Comic Moments" in 2008.

Marilyn J. Matelski cites Mavis and Derek Wilton as examples of clever naming, in that the serial had created a fitting image of the characters before viewers even saw them together.

=== Departure ===
Derek Wilton was axed by producer Brian Park in a high-profile cull in 1997. His axing was said to have caused his co-worker Thelma Barlow (who played his on-screen wife Mavis) to quit her role in the show. While appearing on ITVs This Morning in October 2010, Barlow denied it was the reason she left the show, stating she had decided to quit before Baldwin was axed.

== Storylines ==
Derek was often dominated by women; he remained a bachelor until after his mother's death in 1981 as he always bowed to her wishes. He first met Mavis Riley (Thelma Barlow) in 1976 but remained non-committal until 1984 when they agreed to marry. On their wedding day, the indecisive couple jilted each other.

Forever letting Mavis down, Derek was usually too proud to admit he was at fault but still went to her with his problems. His biggest mistake was marrying his boss's daughter, Angela Hawthorne (Diane Fletcher) in 1985, even though it was Mavis he really wanted. After divorcing Angela, Derek finally married Mavis in 1988 and in 1990 they moved into 4 Coronation Street.

On the career front, Derek never had much luck; he usually worked as a salesman but his jobs never tended to last long, and in desperation for employment he usually had to turn to people who had caused problems in his and Mavis's lives, including Angela and Mavis's ex-partner Victor Pendlebury (Christopher Coll). Eccentric and pompous, Derek was the perfect match for dithering Mavis as they were very much alike: their old-fashioned mannerisms and tendency to over-dramatize everything sometimes made them the butt of the neighbours' jokes, especially their immediate neighbour, Des Barnes (Philip Middlemiss). Derek died from a heart attack during a road rage incident on Mavis's birthday in 1997.
