= Sarah Long =

British actress and presenter (1938–1987)

- Born: 18 March 1938; London, England, United Kingdom
- Died: 23 November 1987 (aged 49); London, England, United Kingdom
- Occupations: Actress, television (presenter)
- Known for: Play School (presenter)
- Spouse: Peter Baldwin

Sarah Long (18 March 1938 – 23 November 1987) was an English actress and children's television presenter.

== Biography ==
Sarah Long was born in London, England. she is best remembered for her long run as a presenter on the preschool children's television series Play School from September 1971 until May 1986.

On stage, as a young actress, her first West End success came as Anne Callifer in Graham Greene's The Potting Shed; she also portrayed another Anne in The Diary of Anne Frank.

She also appeared in films and television, notably as Evelyn Harrington in Village of the Damned (1960) and as the young Queen Mary in the film adaptation of Henry VIII and his Six Wives (1972).

She was married to the television actor Peter Baldwin, and they had two children.

She died in London, England of cancer on 23 November 1987, at the age of 49.
