= Malcolm Hebden =

English retired actor (born 1939)

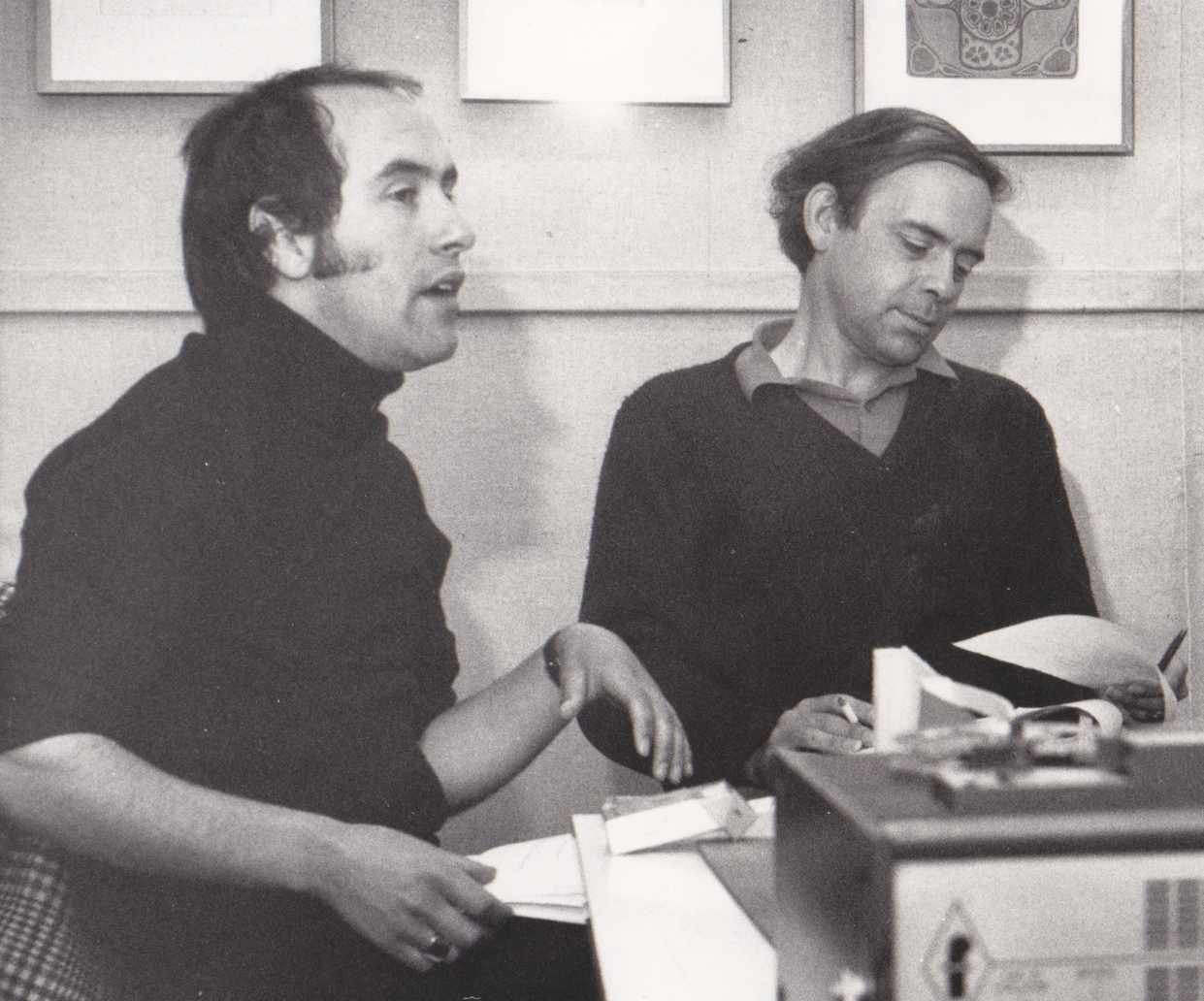
- Hebden (left) with playwright Alan Plater in 1972
- Born: 21 December 1939 (age 86); Chester, Cheshire, England
- Education: Rose Bruford College
- Occupation: Actor (retired)
- Years active: 1972–2020
- Known for: Role of Norris Cole in Coronation Street

Malcolm Hebden (born 21 December 1939) is an English retired actor. He is known for playing Norris Cole in the ITV soap opera Coronation Street on and off between 1994 and 1997, regularly from 1999 to 2017, and intermittently between 2019 and 2020. Aged 81, he announced his retirement from acting due to ill health.

== Early life ==
Hebden was born on 21 December 1939 in Chester before his family moved to Burnley, Lancashire, three weeks later. He was educated at West Gate High School and began his career as a window dresser in Burnley. He found school difficult due to "severe dyslexia". He was involved in amateur dramatics groups, one of which included Richard Moore, called The Highcliffe Players. When aged 28, he attended the Rose Bruford Drama School in London before beginning a career in theatre.

== Career ==
Hebden first appeared in Coronation Street from 1974 to 1975, as Mavis Riley's (Thelma Barlow) Spanish boyfriend Carlos. He first appeared as Norris Cole in 1994; he left in 1997, before returning to the role in December 1999. He also appeared in the very first episode of police procedural period drama Heartbeat as well as the sixteenth episode of its ninth series. Hebden’s other roles include portraying model toy salesman Oliver Shawcross in the short-lived ITV soap opera Albion Market.

In 1999, Hebden made a brief appearance as a pharmacist in the television film Lost for Words, alongside Pete Postlethwaite, Anne Reid and Thora Hird. He also made an appearance in Last of the Summer Wine and also in Children's Ward.

Along with his on-screen business partner Barbara Knox (Rita Sullivan), Hebden won the Best Onscreen Partnership award at the British Soap Awards in May 2006. Additionally, he won the Funniest Character award for two consecutive years at the 2001 and 2002 Inside Soap Awards.

Hebden had a near-fatal heart attack in December 2017, and was absent from Coronation Street from December 2017 to April 2019. However, in March 2019, it was announced that Hebden would return briefly in May 2019. He made his final appearance in June 2020. In January 2021, he announced his retirement from acting, at the age of 81.
