= Mavis Wilton =

Fictional character from Coronation Street

- Coronation Street character
- Portrayed by: Thelma Barlow
- Duration: 1971–1997
- First appearance: 11 August 1971
- Last appearance: 10 October 1997
- Introduced by: Leslie Duxbury (1971); Brian Armstrong (1972); Eric Prytherch (1973)
In-universe information
- Occupation: Office Clerk; Newsagent; Guest house owner
- Father: Tom Riley
- Mother: Margaret Riley
- Husband: Derek Wilton (1988–1997)
- Uncles: Ambrose
- Aunts: Edith Platt
- First cousins: Ethel Platt; Nora

Mavis Wilton (also Riley) is a fictional character from the British ITV soap opera Coronation Street, played by Thelma Barlow. A long-running series regular, Mavis appeared in the show for 26 years from 1971 to 1997. Introduced for a one-off guest appearance, she proved popular with producers and viewers and subsequently became a regular.

Mavis was portrayed as moralising, repressed, and dithering, and often appeared in comic scenes with her boss Rita Sullivan (Barbara Knox) or her husband Derek Wilton (Peter Baldwin). She was generally well received by critics, described as a national institution and one of Coronation Street's best loved characters, an old-fashioned spinster. Barlow has been praised for her portrayal of Mavis, a character notably spoofed by impressionist Les Dennis during the 1980s.

Barlow decided to leave Coronation Street in 1997; her character left to run a guest house in Cartmel following the death of her husband. Barlow has said that the producers of Coronation Street have repeatedly asked her to return as Mavis, but she has so far declined.

== Creation and development ==
=== Characterisation ===
Mavis Riley's 1971 guest appearance proved to be a hit with viewers, persuading the producers of Coronation Street to make her a regular character. It has been reported that Barlow based her portrayal of Mavis on a woman she had seen working in Granada studios (where Coronation Street is filmed) as well as "dozens of northern women she had seen battered into submission by worry". Discussing the woman who inspired Mavis's characterisation, Barlow said, "She had a strong core, but didn't show it. She was desperate to be liked but she didn't want to appear pushy."

Discussing her character, Barlow described Mavis as a "soppy thing", adding "she had great integrity, and she was a very loyal person. She would stick by her morality. She was a mouse to begin with, and then she met [her future husband] Derek and ... she learnt to be quite tough." In Daran Little's book The Coronation Street Story Mavis is described as a "very creative person". She often met men through her creative endeavours, but her status as a spinster often led to feelings of bitterness, and she resented that her friend Emily had married two men before she had married once. Her lack of male attention led Mavis to be labelled the "eternal virgin" of Coronation Street. The serial's New Zealand broadcaster TVNZ described her as "flighty and romantic".

The character has been discussed in a variety of publications. Hilary Kingsley in her book Soapbox discusses Mavis's reticent and moralistic personality as seen in her drinking habits: Mavis drinks fruit juices, but on special occasions sweet sherry: "two for Mavis is one too many" says Kingsley. In a 1983 issue of New Statesman magazine, Mavis is described as having a face that is "never quite sure of its own shape". The author describes the storyline featuring Mavis facing the prospect of a trial marriage or losing her boyfriend as an example of the "either-or situations" into which soap opera is "forever ensnaring its characters". An article in the Evening Standard said Mavis was "meek and mild" and "would not say boo to a budgie". In the same newspaper Mark Walton-Cook discusses Mavis's style, stating: "I keep picturing Corrie's Mavis Riley twittering and clutching at the high neck of a securely fastened polyester blouse with a tasteful cameo brooch".

Mavis was frequently used to provide comic relief; she has been dubbed one of Coronation Street's comedy stars, well known for her catchphrase, "ooh, I don't really know". Susan Purdie writes that Mavis's storylines and persona often "hover between pathos and comedy". The critic David Meade agrees, noting that Mavis was "a permanent mourner-in-waiting". Sean-Day Lewis describes Mavis as "muddled and mousy", while Dennis Joseph Enright calls her a moralistic shop assistant who "no one takes very seriously". She was often spoofed by comedian Les Dennis in the 1980s; the character featured along with Dustin Gee's impression of Vera Duckworth in a variety of sketch shows.

=== Comedy partnerships ===
The producers of the show decided to pair Mavis with Rita Fairclough (Barbara Knox) by giving her a job in Rita's newsagent shop. Christine Geraghty has cited Mavis and Rita's friendship as an example of a soap opera portraying an important, stable, intimate female relationship: "Rita is Mavis's boss, but she is also one of her closest friends".

"I think the public reaction was about 30 percent marry Derek, 30 percent marry Victor and 40 percent don't marry either of them! It was fun because Mavis doesn't often hit the big headlines or anything like that. She's just consistently there."

— Barlow describes the reaction to her wedding storyline. (1995)

A spinster for many years, Mavis resisted the advances of men, often too shy to allow dating to progress beyond the initial stages of courtship. Ian Randall comments that "Many a man has been smitten with Mavis Riley, but unfortunately she always seemed to attract the drippier of the male species". In 1976 a love interest was introduced for Mavis in the form of Derek Wilton (Peter Baldwin), but it was more than a decade before the couple finally married in 1988, after simultaneously jilting each other four years earlier. Barbara Knox, who plays Rita, said, "She [Mavis] was quite a tough little character. You know, a lot of girls would have gone through with [the wedding], and she stuck to her guns and said 'No, no this isn't right.' Again, dithering and weepy, but she was tough enough to do it. That scene [where Rita supports her decision to jilt Derek] is reflective of the two of them. That was the essence of the friendship, they stuck up for each other and [were] great friends, all the way through."

Richard Dyer perceives the Mavis and Derek characters to be as "shy physically" as one another, whereas Kathryn Hone, writing in The Sunday Times, considers Derek "even more dithering than Mavis". Nevertheless the on-screen relationship between the couple progresses quickly, despite the interference of Derek's mother. Actors Thelma Barlow and Peter Baldwin had worked together before their casting as Derek and Mavis, and the two became close friends.

Derek and Mavis have been described by What's on TV as "an old-fashioned pair who were made for each other", and were typically featured in comic storylines, such as one in 1995 that saw their garden gnome kidnapped and transported around the world; Derek and Mavis received pictures of the gnome in various exotic locations, sent to them with ransom notes. It transpired that the kidnapper was Derek's friend Norris Cole (Malcolm Hebden). The Daily Record labelled this storyline one of "Coronation Street's Classic Comic Moments" in 2008.

Marilyn J. Matelski cites Mavis and Derek Wilton as examples of clever naming, in that the serial had created a fitting image of the characters before viewers even saw them together.

=== Departure ===
Barlow decided to leave the role of Mavis in 1997, having played it for 26 years. It was reported that she had quit following the axing of Peter Baldwin, who played her screen husband Derek Wilton. At the time Coronation Street was undergoing off-screen changes following the introduction of a new executive producer, Brian Park, dubbed "the axeman" in the press after he culled many characters from the regular cast. The actress Jean Alexander, who played the character of Hilda Ogden in the serial, went to the press in protest at the news. She wrote: "Peter Baldwin and Thelma Barlow were a wonderfully funny couple, but they've killed off Derek and now Mavis is about to leave. Even all the humour has been taken out of scenes between Mavis and Rita." Park suggested that when he took over as head producer there was a general feeling among the programme-makers that "Derek and Mavis had had their day". Barlow has stated her belief that the producers killed off Derek as a result of her own desire to leave. She said: "It was sort of cruel, really; I mean, they could have killed Mavis off. It was a new director and a new producer, and they wanted to make a big news splash. It was very hard for Peter [who played Derek]." The village of Cartmel, near Grange-over-Sands, enjoyed a boost in tourism attributed to the exposure given to it by Mavis's storyline.

In 2002, producers asked Barlow to return as Mavis, but she was too busy. In 2006 Barlow claimed that she had again been asked to return to Coronation Street, but had refused as she felt the storylines were not good enough for Mavis. Barlow stated in 2007 that she is unlikely to return, because she would be unable to cope with the accelerated production schedule of one more episode a week since her last appearance in 1997. Executive producer Kim Crowther said in 2009 that she would have liked Mavis to return to the soap.

== Storylines ==
Born in Weatherfield, Mavis was brought up in Grange-over-Sands where her parents, despite being teetotal, ran an off-licence. Mavis first appears in Coronation Street in 1971 at Emily Nugent (Eileen Derbyshire) and Ernest Bishop's (Stephen Hancock) engagement party, as a friend/colleague of Emily's from the mail order warehouse and is invited to be a bridesmaid at the wedding. She is initially employed as a receptionist at the local vet and then as an assistant in the corner shop, but takes a job offered by Rita Littlewood (Barbara Knox) at The Kabin newsagents, 14 Rosamund Street. Mavis and Rita are complete opposites – Rita brassy and self-assured, Mavis mouse-like and dowdy – but they get on well and become friends. Rita often despairs at Mavis's choices in life, particularly when it comes to men. Rita's dominance over Mavis seems like bullying to outsiders, but she is only thinking of Mavis's best interests.

In 1973, Mavis starts dating the equally shy Jerry Booth (Graham Haberfield), but it remains platonic. Jerry dies of a heart attack in 1975 before being able to express his romantic intentions. She meets salesman Derek Wilton (Peter Baldwin) the following year. They date, but the relationship is strained by Derek's interfering mother, who believes that Mavis is not good enough for her son. The relationship remains non-committal until 1983, when another man competes for Mavis's hand, the artistic Victor Pendlebury (Christopher Coll). Mavis is torn as she likes both but chooses Derek in the end. On their wedding day in 1984 Mavis has second thoughts about marrying Derek and jilts him at the altar. Her guilt turns to indignation when she learns that Derek – feeling the same way she does – did not attend the ceremony either. Derek goes on to an unhappy marriage with Angela Hawthorne (Diane Fletcher), but in 1986 he begins wooing Mavis again, realizing he made a mistake when he let her go. Mavis eventually decides Derek is the man for her and the couple marry in November 1988. The other residents of Coronation Street consider Mavis and Derek something of a joke, but neither care as they are genuinely in love. They spend evenings reading aloud to each other and discussing the events of the day. They remain happy despite the occasional problem, but their happiness is cut short in 1997 when Derek dies suddenly of a heart attack after a road rage incident. Devastated, at his funeral Mavis chastises those who mocked her marriage over the years.

Living in Weatherfield without Derek proves too difficult for Mavis. She surprises Rita when she suggests that they should move away and go into business together. They discuss the possibility of running a guest house in Cartmel, a village in the Lake District. Rita considers it but both realize that a partnership would not work. Mavis goes without her, buying a guest house and leaving Weatherfield in October 1997. She and Rita bid each other an emotional farewell, ending a partnership of 25 years.

== Reception ==
Brian Meade of the Daily Mirror has suggested that Mavis was a "national institution" who enriched the life of millions. In the Scottish newspaper The Herald Alison Kerr listed Mavis as one of the female characters that in her opinion have been "the real pivot" in the serial, "ever ready with a sympathetic word". An article in the Huddersfield Daily Examiner said that Mavis was one of Coronation Street's best-loved characters, describing her as timid and "clad in sensible cardigan and shoes". Jules Stenson writing in The People said that Mavis was much like the previous character Minnie Caldwell (Margot Bryant): they were both "easily bullied" and, like Minnie, Mavis seemed to be "on the shelf for life" until her marriage to Derek.

In Meade's opinion, Mavis gave a name to and represented a certain type of woman: "A 1940s spinster with a 1940s head who's looked 50 since birth. A Woman's Realm made flesh. And you have a name for her. She's a Mavis ... Mavis Riley was a masterpiece of observation". His opinion was shared by Gerlinde Frey-Vor and Julia Hallam, who consider Mavis to be a "model for a spinsterly type of woman". Brian Meade suggested that Barlow had "honed a comic gem until it cut into the national consciousness" in her characterisation of Mavis, likening her to other successful TV characters like Basil Fawlty, Del Boy Trotter and Alf Garnett. Meade applauded Barlow for staying true to Mavis's character for 26 years, "sustaining the most timid, world-weary of women with remarkable consistency. Try to recall her great lines and you are stumped. Every sentence she whimpered seemed to begin with 'Ooh Derek' and end with: 'Well, I don't really know'", but he suggested that she had graced some of Coronation Street's "finest scenes", pointing to Mavis and Rita's spoof of a Laurel and Hardy act as one example.

The character received various accolades over the years. At the TV Times "Corrie Awards", Mavis and Derek were nominated for "Best Couple", and Susannah Clapp listed Mavis in The Observer's "10 best Coronation Street characters" list. Clapp said "Thelma Barlow played [Mavis], with exceptional delicacy, in a variety of pastel pinnies, for 26 years." She concluded that she had a "tumultuous relationship with her soulmate, Derek". When Barlow quit the role as Mavis in 1997, various Coronation Street stars praised her contribution: Sherrie Hewson (who played Maureen Holdsworth) said "Thelma's a wonderful lady and a superb actress. We'll miss her"; Michael Le Vell (Kevin Webster) said "Thelma's quality as an actress shone through for everyone to see after the death of Derek"; Peter Baldwin (Derek) said "It has made a difference to the programme and the departure of Derek and now Mavis is going to upset a lot of viewers".

Mavis has been praised for providing Coronation Street with much comic relief via her partnerships with Rita and Derek. Reflecting on Mavis and Derek's partnership in 2010, Paul Vallely of The Independent said that they were an example of a "great double act", but he noted that they could not survive in the serial after it became focused on "dramatic storylines".

Mavis has remained a popular and well-loved character. In 2010, thirteen years after her departure, Darren Fitzgerald wrote in The Sentinel (Stoke-on-Trent) that he wanted to see Mavis return to the serial and that he would have written out half of the cast and brought her back as a replacement. But Mavis has also been criticised: Jack Kibble-White, writing for MSN, called Mavis and Derek a "pathetic couple", suggesting that their gnome plot was one of the serial's most bizarre. Inside Soap ran a feature compiling "The 100 greatest soap stories ever told". They featured Mavis and Derek's wedding story in which they jilted one-another as their 83rd choice.
