= Rob Mallard =

English actor (born 1992)

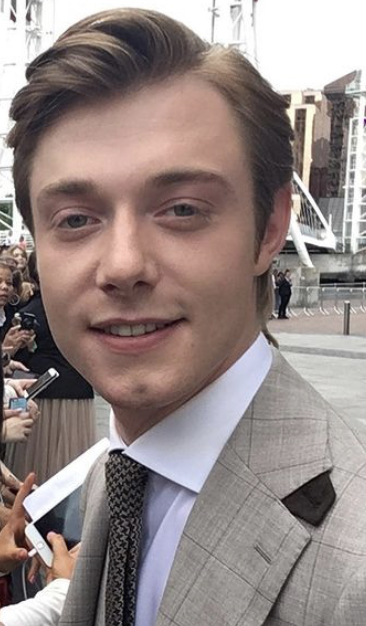
- Mallard in 2019
- Born: Robert Stephen Mallard; 19 May 1992 (age 34); Manchester, England
- Occupation: Actor
- Years active: 2003–present
- Known for: Coronation Street (2016–present)

Robert Stephen Mallard (born 19 May 1992) is an English actor from Manchester, England, best known for playing Daniel Osbourne in the long-running ITV soap opera Coronation Street (2016–present).

== Career ==
On 14 September 2016, it was announced that Mallard had been cast in Coronation Street as Ken Barlow's (William Roache) youngest son Daniel Osbourne, being the third actor to play the role after Lewis Harney and Dominic Holmes, respectively. Mallard said, "It feels great to be starting work on Coronation Street and I'm looking forward to getting to know everyone. I grew up watching Coronation Street, so the chance to be in it, especially playing a part like Daniel, is very exciting." Producer Kate Oates said, "Daniel is a different Barlow altogether, more sensitive and bookish, he is clearly a chip off the old block, but there is more to Ken's youngest son than meets the eye. Rob is a talented young actor who is perfect for the role". In June 2017, Mallard won the Best Newcomer award at the 2017 British Soap Awards for his portrayal of Daniel.

== Personal life ==
Mallard is gay. He came out publicly in 2017 in an interview with Gay Times magazine and revealed that his family were supportive of him when he came out to them at the age of 17. He added that he "never planned to keep it quiet" with his only concern being that "if I'm with a female character, will an audience who knows I'm gay in real life believe it? But that was just my own fears because I do believe they will." Mallard entered a relationship with his Coronation Street co-star, Daniel Brocklebank, who played Billy Mayhew, in May 2017. They split up that July, but remained good friends. He began dating modelling agent Matthew Martin in 2023, and in February 2025, he made a cameo in an episode of Coronation Street.

During an appearance on ITV's This Morning in March 2018, Mallard revealed that he has an essential tremor, a neurological disorder that causes involuntary shaking. He had previously appeared on the show in January 2018, and after the appearance numerous comments were made on social media about his demeanour, especially his shaking, with some accusing him of being drunk. He said that he had the condition for nearly a decade.

== Filmography ==
Year	Title	Role	Notes
2003	Bottom of the Ninth	Freaky Frank	Short video
2004	Brass Tacks	Dominick	Film
2013	Pound House	Audience member	Unknown episodes
2015	No Offence	Neil	Season 1, episode 6
2015	Emmerdale	Connor Jennsen	3 episodes
2016	Fresh Meat	Dale	2 episodes
2016–present	Coronation Street	Daniel Osbourne	Series regular
2020	Chapter 2: Zach	Walsh	Short video

== Awards and nominations ==
Year	Award	Category	Nominated work	Result	Refs
2017	British Soap Awards	Best Newcomer	Coronation Street	Won	
2017	Inside Soap Awards	Best Newcomer	Coronation Street	Nominated	
2018	National Television Awards	Newcomer	Coronation Street	Nominated	
2019	British Soap Awards	Best Male Dramatic Performance	Coronation Street	Nominated	
2019	RTS North West Awards	Best Performance in A Continuing Drama	Coronation Street	Won	
