= Gaby Hinsliff =

English journalist (born 1971)

Gabrielle Hinsliff
- Born: Gabrielle Seal Hinsliff; 4 July 1971 (age 55); Chelmsford, England
- Education: Queens' College, Cambridge
- Occupation: Journalist
- Years active: 1994–present
- Spouse: James Clark
- Father: Geoffrey Hinsliff

Gabrielle Seal Hinsliff (born 4 July 1971) is an English journalist and columnist for The Guardian.

== Early life and career ==
Born in Chelmsford, she is one of the daughters of the actor Geoffrey Hinsliff. She attended Queens' College, Cambridge, graduating with a first-class degree in English.

After two years at the Grimsby Evening Telegraph from 1994 to 1996, Hinsliff joined the Daily Mail, where she was successively a news reporter and health reporter, before becoming a political reporter in 1997, and finally chief political correspondent the following year. She joined The Observer in March 2000, initially in the same post, following Andy McSmith, who had joined The Daily Telegraph. Hinsliff was the youngest political editor of a national newspaper when she was promoted in December 2004, this time succeeding Kamal Ahmed, who had been her immediate superior at The Observer since her original appointment.

Although Hinsliff loved the job, she resigned in late September 2009 "to get a life", to move "out of London to write, think, do some projects I never had time for" and "to spend more time with her husband and son".

== Career since 2012 ==
Hinsliff's book Half a Wife (Chatto & Windus) was published in 2012. Eleanor Mills in The Sunday Times wrote that it is elevated "from the normal middle-class whinge" by "the rigorous analysis she brings to the wider forces that have shaped modern family life and how they might be re-sliced so that families can live differently". Hinsliff, Mills writes, "calls for a non-gender-aligned sharing out of domestic tasks".

Hinsliff spent a period at The Times until July 2014, before becoming a columnist on The Guardian the following September.

In July 2012, she began as editor-at-large of Grazia magazine contributing interviews and columns. Hinsliff contributes to BBC and Sky programmes.

== Personal life ==
Hinsliff is married to James Clark, a public relations professional.

== Works ==
- Half a Wife: The Working Family's Guide to Getting a Life Back (Vintage, 2013) ISBN 978-0099555742
