= Peter Baldwin (actor) =

English actor (1933–2015)

- Born: Peter Francis Baldwin; 29 July 1933; Chidham, Sussex, England
- Died: 21 October 2015 (aged 82); Hampstead, London, England
- Occupation: Actor
- Years active: 1956–2009, 2012 (acting); 2008–2015 (business)
- Television: Coronation Street
- Spouse: Sarah Long (m. 1965; died 1987)
- Children: 2

Peter Francis Baldwin (29 July 1933 – 21 October 2015) was an English actor. He was best known for his role as Derek Wilton in the British soap opera Coronation Street.

== Early life ==
Peter was born in Chidham, near Chichester, Sussex, where his father was a primary school headmaster and his mother a teacher. He attended Horsham Grammar School and then did National Service in the army. His introduction to the theatre came during the Second World War when his parents took him to see a Chichester Festival Theatre production of Peter Pan starring Ann Todd and Alastair Sim.

== Career ==
After training to be an actor at the Bristol Old Vic Theatre School, Baldwin joined the West of England Theatre Company, in which he worked with future Coronation Street partner Thelma Barlow. He later toured with the Old Vic and joined the Bristol Old Vic. Baldwin made several appearances in films (in bit parts and extras) until he landed a main role in the television comedy Girls About Town, which ran from 1969 to 1971. He also made guest appearances on other television series such as Menace, The New Dick Van Dyke Show and Spy Trap, and had several roles in West End theatre. He appeared on ITV as the Hotel Manager, Mr Humfries, in an adaptation of Agatha Christie's, At Bertram's Hotel in 1986. He appeared as a Desk Clerk in the Tales of the Unexpected (TV series) episode (9/6) "Wink Three Times" (1988).

In 1976 he joined the cast of Coronation Street, intermittently playing the character of Derek Wilton, eventually returning as a regular character in 1988. Derek wooed and then let down Mavis Riley for many years, but eventually the two got married. It was reported that Derek was one of the favourite characters among a certain segment of viewers of the show, but in 1997 the character was killed off.

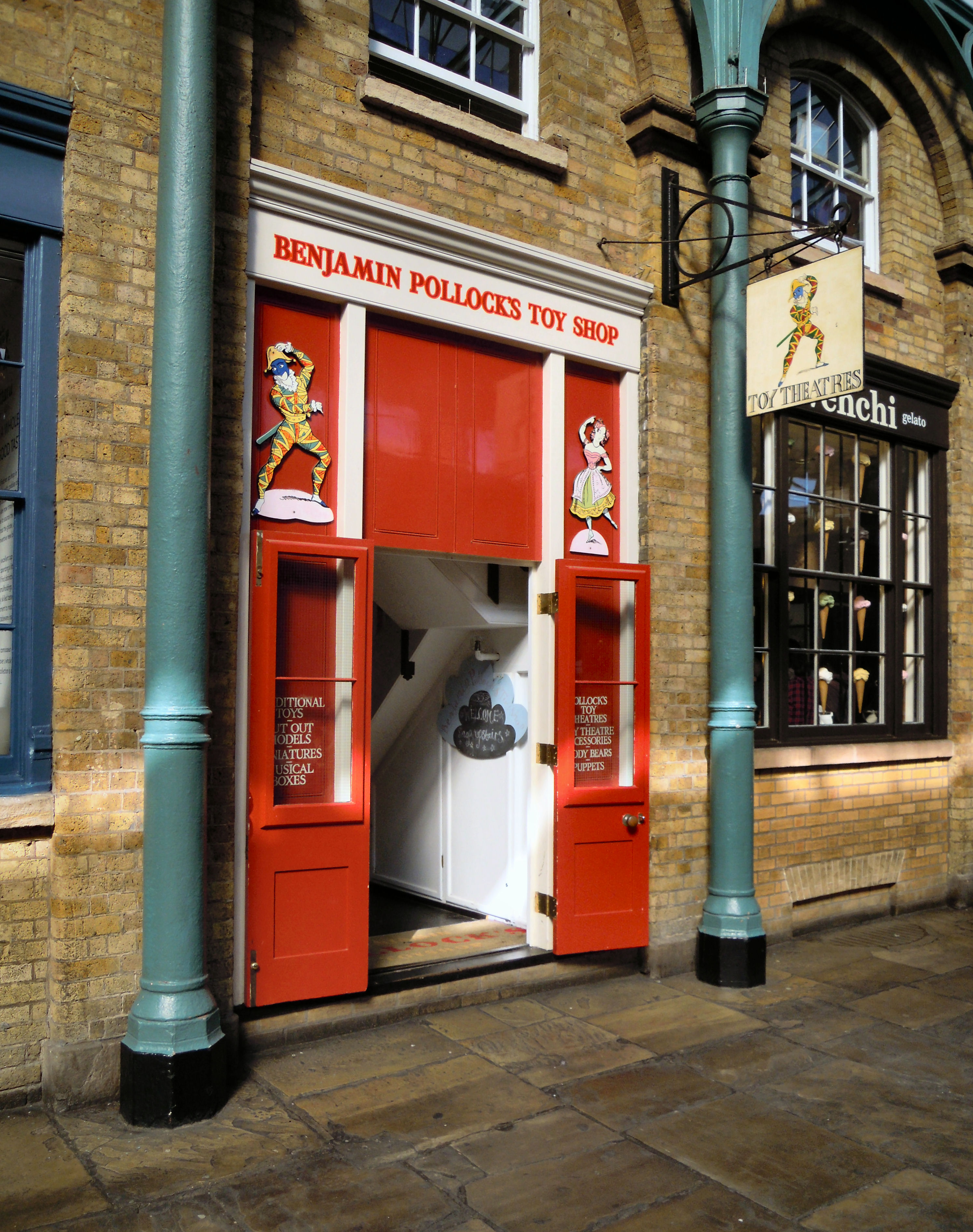
Benjamin Pollock's Toy Shop, which Baldwin co-owned from 1988 to his death

For the year after this, Baldwin made many appearances on talk shows and quiz shows in the UK such as GMTV, This Morning and Crosswits and also returned to the stage for the first time in a decade in A Month of Sundays, as well as touring in the musical Summer Holiday. He then joined the cast of the TV show Out Of Sight as Uncle Gus until 1999.

He continued to appear in TV series, including The Court Room and Doctors. In 2005 he was a panelist on the Channel 4 quiz show Countdown.

In 1988 Baldwin took over the ownership of Benjamin Pollock's Toy Shop in London's Covent Garden, where he had previously worked between acting jobs and could often be found serving behind the counter.

He was married to the former Play School presenter and actress Sarah Long until her death in 1987. They met in 1961 when they appeared together in a production of Romeo and Juliet which toured Europe and America. The couple married in 1965. Baldwin made an appearance on the 1978 Boxing Day edition of Play School, which Long was co-presenting with Don Spencer.

Baldwin died at home in Hampstead in north London aged 82, after a short battle with cancer. He was survived by his children Julia and Matthew.
