= Geoffrey Hinsliff =

English actor (1937–2024)

- Born: 23 November 1937; Leeds, West Riding of Yorkshire, England
- Died: 15 September 2024 (aged 86)
- Education: Royal Academy of Dramatic Art
- Occupation: Actor
- Spouse: Judith Seal (m. 1967)
- Children: 2, including Gaby Hinsliff

Geoffrey Hinsliff (23 November 1937 – 15 September 2024) was an English actor best known for his portrayal of Don Brennan in Coronation Street from 1987 to 1997.

== Life and career ==
Hinsliff was born in Leeds on 23 November 1937. In November 1954, aged sixteen, he appeared with the Leeds Service of Youth Players in a production of Outward Bound by Sutton Vane at the Civic Theatre.

Hinsliff trained at RADA, before making his television debut in an episode of Z-Cars. He went on to appear in Adam Adamant Lives!, Dixon of Dock Green, UFO, Crown Court, The Professionals and Heartbeat, and also played a wireless operator in the film A Bridge Too Far.

In 1978 Hinsliff appeared as a sergeant in an episode of the hard-hitting British police drama The Professionals, the episode entitled When the Heat Cools Off.

In 1979 he took the role of Doctor Astrov in Anton Chekhov's Uncle Vanya at Leeds Playhouse directed by Michael Attenborough.

Starting in 1987, Hinsliff appeared regularly on the British television soap opera series Coronation Street as Don Brennan. Hinsliff had previously appeared on one episode of the show in 1977 as a minor character named Eric Bailey. Brennan's storylines on the show ranged from on and off again extramarital affairs with Denise Black's character Denise Osbourne to an attempted kidnapping of Alma Halliwell, portrayed by Amanda Barrie. According to show broadcasters ITV, his character's turbulent relationship with his wife Ivy, portrayed by Lynne Perrie, attracted praise and was generally well received by fans. Hinsliff was eventually written off the show in 1997, when his character Don Brennan descended into villainy upon clashing with his arch-foe Mike Baldwin (portrayed by Johnny Briggs himself). This involved Don setting fire to Mike's factory and then kidnapping Mike's beloved wife Alma Halliwell before attempting to murder Mike himself, which ultimately ended with Don being killed-off when he died in a vehicle explosion after attempting to run over Mike on that day.

He also had a role in the comedy-drama Brass and appeared in two Doctor Who stories: Image of the Fendahl and Nightmare of Eden. He guest-starred in Holby City as an alcoholic in 2010.

== Personal life and death ==
Hinsliff married Judith Seal on 2 September 1967 in St Cecilia's Church, Little Hadham. They had two children, including journalist Gaby Hinsliff.

Hinsliff lived in Winster in the Derbyshire Dales. He died on 15 September 2024, at the age of 86.

== Selected filmography ==
- O Lucky Man! (1973)
- The Battle of Billy's Pond (1976) – Tanker Driver
- I, Claudius (1976) – Rufrius
- A Bridge Too Far (1977) – British Wireless Operator
