= Denise Black =

English actress

- Born: Emsworth, Hampshire, England
- Occupation: Actress
- Years active: 1988–present
- Known for: Coronation Street (1992–1997, 2007, 2017); Queer As Folk (1997); Emmerdale (2013, 2015–2017)
- Website: Denise Black

Denise Black is an English actress. She is best known for her roles in Coronation Street, Emmerdale, and Queer As Folk.

== Early life and education ==
Denise Black was born in Emsworth, Hampshire.

After attending Portsmouth High School for Girls, she studied psychology at University of London. She also worked in a local psychiatric care home. After graduating, she travelled to Gibraltar, later moving to the West Indies, setting her sights on becoming an actress.

== Career ==
Black's first professional role was as a cat in Miniatures at Sheffield's Crucible Theatre. She worked in several fringe theatres before gaining her Equity card in 1980. Black joined the Actors' Touring Company and performed Shakespeare around South America and in Israel, Greece and Yugoslavia.

When Black returned to the UK, she appeared with fellow-actresses Josie Lawrence and Kate McKenzie at the Newcastle Playhouse in La Pasionaria, and to further their interests in music and singing, they formed a jazz group, Denise Black & the Kray Sisters. Her friendship with Lawrence landed Black parts in Channel 4's Saturday Live and Josie. Black then joined Julian Clary on stage at London's Donmar Warehouse.

In 1988 she appeared at the Oldham Coliseum in The Threepenny Opera. Over the years, Black would feature in numerous other stage productions including Art of Success; Stop Children's Laughter (at Bolton's Octagon Theatre), and Shakespeare's King Lear and Twelfth Night (with the Cambridge Touring Company).

In 1990, Black made her television drama debut playing a prostitute in "Street Life", an episode of the BBC's Casualty. She appeared as Carrie Evans in Shoscombe Old Place, an edition of The Casebook of Sherlock Holmes (1991). She appeared in many television series during the 1990s and 2000s including A Touch of Frost, Dangerfield, The Bill, Bad Girls, New Tricks, and Doc Martin.

=== Coronation Street ===
In 1992, Black joined the soap opera Coronation Street as Denise Osbourne, remaining on the show until 1997. Her main storylines revolved around her love affair with Ken Barlow (William Roache). Black briefly returned to the role in 2007 and again in 2017.

=== Queer as Folk ===
Black was one of the main cast members of the Channel 4 TV series Queer As Folk, written by Russell T Davies. She played the role of Hazel Tyler in all 10 episodes of the show. She reprised the role of Hazel (as her ghost on Canal Street) in the 2015 follow-up series Cucumber.

=== Emmerdale ===
On 20 June 2013, it was announced that Black would be joining the cast of Emmerdale, as Joanie Wright, the adoptive grandmother of Amy Wyatt's (Chelsea Halfpenny) son Kyle whom she gave away shortly after he was born. Black made her first appearance in the soap on 12 August 2013, before departing on 14 November 2013. She reprised the role on 17 June 2015 as a regular cast member, before Black departed again permanently on 30 January 2017, when her character was killed off from a heart attack after being released from a short-stint in prison.

=== Other roles ===
In 2010, Black's band played at the Edinburgh Festival when she was in mid-UK national tour of a stage version of Calendar Girls. In 2011, Black played the role of Mother Superior, alongside Michael Starke and Cynthia Erivo in the first UK tour of the musical Sister Act.

In 2015, Black made a guest appearance as Liam Conroy's (Adam Gillen) mother Gloria, attempting to lure him back to the UK, in Benidorm. In 2020, Black starrred in the epic historical drama film The Lady of Heaven in the role of Bibi, a loving grandmother who narrates the historical story of Lady Fatima. In 2021, she played Mrs. Hudson in the Netflix series The Irregulars.

In May 2023 she was announced as a cast member of the upcoming Disney+ series Rivals, alongside David Tennant, Alex Hassell, Aidan Turner, Katherine Parkinson, Emily Atack, and Danny Dyer. Black played the role of Joyce Madden in the series.

== Personal life ==
Black lives in Southsea and sings with a band, The Loose Screw. They played a series of cabaret shows in November 2009.

In 2004, while filming the BBC miniseries To the Ends of the Earth in KwaZulu-Natal, South Africa, Black and two friends, including co-star Benedict Cumberbatch, were abducted at gunpoint by a group of local men after their vehicle suffered a blown tyre. They were bound and driven to an unsettled territory before being released unharmed without explanation.
