= Barbara Knox =

English actress (born 1933)

Barbara Knox MBE
- Born: Barbara Brothwood; 30 September 1933 (age 92); Oldham, Lancashire, England
- Occupation: Actress
- Years active: 1962–present
- Known for: Coronation Street (1964, 1972–present)
- Spouses: Denis Mullaney (m. 1956; div. 1977) John Knox (m. 1977; div. 1994)
- Children: 3

Barbara Knox (née Brothwood, formerly Mullaney; born 30 September 1933) is an English actress, best known for her long-running portrayal of Rita Tanner in the ITV soap opera Coronation Street. She first appeared as Rita Littlewood for one episode in December 1964, before returning to the show as a full-time cast member in January 1972. She is currently the second-longest-serving cast member in Coronation Street, behind William Roache (who has played Ken Barlow since the first episode in December 1960). Knox is also the second-longest-serving current television soap opera star in the world after playing Rita for 54 years.

Knox made her professional stage debut in 1962 at the Oldham Coliseum Theatre, had a small role as a dancer in the 1969 remake of Goodbye, Mr. Chips and appeared opposite Ken Dodd in his 1972 comedy series Funny You Should Say That. She won the 1989 TV Times Award for Best Actress for one of her best remembered storylines, involving the character Alan Bradley. In 2006, she won the British Soap Award for Best On-Screen Partnership with Malcolm Hebden, having previously received the Lifetime Achievement Award at the 2004 ceremony. She was made an MBE in the 2010 Queen's Birthday Honours List alongside her co-star and friend Eileen Derbyshire.

== Early life ==
Knox was born Barbara Brothwood in Oldham, Lancashire. Knox was an only child. Her mother Emma worked in a mill, while her father Tom was a moulder at a foundry, and later a fireman.

== Early career ==
Knox left school at the age of 15 and worked as a telegraphist in the Post Office, learning shorthand and typing and had to pass Civil Service exams. She also worked in offices, shops and a factory. During this time she took part in amateur theatre until Carl Paulsen, who ran Oldham Rep, asked her to appear in The Boyfriend in 1962, which was her professional stage debut.

== Career ==
Knox later appeared in television programmes such as Never Mind the Quality, Feel the Width, George and the Dragon and A Family at War, as well as doing a stint in Emergency – Ward 10. She also had a small role as a dancer in the musical remake of Goodbye, Mr. Chips (1969) and did anything needed from announcer to stooge alongside several of the UK's top comedians for BBC radio's Comedy Half Hour. In 1972, she appeared opposite Ken Dodd in the sketch show Funny You Should Say That.

=== Coronation Street ===
Knox first played the role of Rita Littlewood in Coronation Street on 2 December 1964, when she appeared for only one episode as a friend of Dennis Tanner. She returned in January 1972 as Rita Bates, the common-law wife of Harry Bates, and in the decades since then the character has been married three times, to Len Fairclough, Ted Sullivan and Dennis Tanner. In 1973, she cut an LP for Philips Records titled On the Street Where I Live.

Since 2010, Knox has given various interviews, including on Paul O'Grady Live on ITV in November 2010, to coincide with Coronation Street's 50th anniversary, which also saw her appear in the ITV quiz show, Coronation Street: The Big 50. She also gave two interviews on This Morning, firstly in 2012, and another in 2013 as part of This Morning's 25-year anniversary and Knox's 80th birthday.

Knox also contributed to the one-off ITV documentary Coronation Street: A Moving Story, which saw the transition from recording at Granada Studios to the new MediaCityUK in 2014. On 31 December 2014, ITV celebrated Knox's contribution to Coronation Street with a special 60-minute documentary for her 50 years as Rita, called Rita and Me. In December 2017, she gave an interview on ITV's Lorraine.

Since the departure of Eileen Derbyshire, who played Emily Bishop from January 1961 to January 2016, Knox is the second-longest-serving cast member behind William Roache, who has played Ken Barlow since the first episode in December 1960.

== Personal life ==
Knox has been married twice. She married Denis Mullaney in July 1956 in Oldham, Lancashire. The couple had three children. They divorced in 1977. She was known professionally as Barbara Mullaney until 1977, the year she married John Knox. The couple divorced in 1994.

Knox, like her friend and co-star Eileen Derbyshire, who played Emily Bishop, shuns publicity and is a very private person. She rarely gives interviews in public, although she has been known to give a few interviews for Coronation Street documentaries and has appeared alongside her fellow Coronation Street co-stars at some of the television awards shows.

In January 1980, Knox was disqualified from driving for two months, for travelling at 101 mph on the M5 motorway in Gloucestershire. On 28 March 2014, it was reported that she had been arrested on suspicion of driving while under the influence of alcohol in her home town of Knutsford, Cheshire. On 4 April 2014, Knox was formally charged, and she appeared at Macclesfield Magistrates' Court on 24 April. She pleaded not guilty, but changed her plea to guilty in January 2015. She was banned from driving for a year, as well as being fined £3,000 and £1,750 in costs.

== Awards and honours ==
Year	Award	Category	Work	Result	Ref.
1989	TV Times Award	Best Actress	Coronation Street	Won	
1989	Mirror International Soap Awards	Best Actress	Coronation Street	Won	
1989	Oracle Teletext Award	Best Actress	Coronation Street	Won	
1990	Oracle Teletext Award	Best Actress	Coronation Street	Won	
2004	British Soap Awards	Best Actress	Coronation Street	Longlisted	
2006	British Soap Awards	Best On-Screen Partnership (with Malcolm Hebden)	Coronation Street	Won	
2008	Digital Spy Soap Awards	Best On-Screen Partnership (with Malcolm Hebden)	Coronation Street	Nominated	
2012	What's on TV	Soap's Greatest Legend	Coronation Street	Nominated	
2018	National Television Award	Best Serial Drama Performance	Coronation Street	Shortlisted	
Special awards
2004	British Soap Awards	Lifetime Achievement	Coronation Street	Recipient	

- Knox was appointed a Member of the Order of the British Empire (MBE) in the 2010 Birthday Honours, for services to drama.
