= Philip Middlemiss =

British actor and presenter

- Born: Philip Sean Lloyd; 19 June 1963 (age 63); Hartlepool, County Durham, England
- Occupation: Actor
- Years active: 1986–2014, 2024

Philip Middlemiss (born Philip Sean Lloyd; 19 June 1963) is an English television, radio actor and businessman, best known for playing bookmaker Des Barnes in ITV's Coronation Street between 1990 and 1998. The character was killed off, ordered by Brian Park, who was the producer at the time. He subsequently appeared in ITV's Where the Heart Is from 2000 to 2006.

== Career ==
After leaving school, Middlemiss joined the National Youth Theatre and studied drama at the London Academy of Music and Dramatic Art. He appeared on stage in plays such as Strippers, Trackers, A Tale of Two Cities and A Christmas Carol. On television he made his debut in 1986 in Ladies in Charge and then had various roles in series such as Inspector Morse, The Bill and Waterfront Beat in which he had a regular role as PC Barry Smith.

Middlemiss made his debut in Coronation Street in February 1990 as newly-wed Des Barnes together with Amelia Bullmore who played his screen wife Steph. Bullmore left the series in 1991, but Middlemiss was a series regular until November 1998 when his character was killed off. Middlemiss wanted his character to be killed off and this has been compared to how Rob James-Collier wanted his character Liam Connor to be killed off in 2008.

After leaving Coronation Street, he made only a small number of acting appearances on television, most notably in the role of David Buckley in the ITV drama Where the Heart Is, from 2000 to 2006. He made several TV appearances as himself on shows such as, Noel's House Party, Blankety Blank and The Brian Conley Show. He appeared on a celebrity edition of Come Dine with Me in 2010 with other former Coronation Street stars, Julie Goodyear, Tupele Dorgu and Ken Morley. He finished first on 23 points winning £1,000 for his chosen charity.

In 2024, Middlemiss had his first acting role in ten years playing DI Travis Lennox on Doctors.

== Personal life ==
Middlemiss has two sons, including Alfie.

On 30 May 2012, Middlemiss declared himself bankrupt after a bad financial investment led to unpaid taxes.

Middlemiss has business interests in Ghana which include a glass factory, a boutique hotel and a theme park. In England, he owns a TV production company.

In May 2020, Middlemiss was wrongly accused of corruption in Ghana in the Airbus HQ scandal and faced 25 years in prison. The scandal made him "one of the world's most wanted men", with Interpol issuing a Red Notice against him. He was never charged and was formally cleared by investigators a year later. His lawyer, Adam Rasul from Holborn Adams, criticised the investigation and the impact it had on Middlemiss. Middlemiss said the false allegations ruined his life as they racked up huge legal costs and left him living in a rented house after his family home was repossessed, as well as it affecting his mental health. He is seeking to take legal action against the Serious Fraud Office (SFO) for the traumatic experience.
