= Thelma Barlow =

English actress and writer (born 1929)

Thelma Vera Barlow
- Born: Thelma Vera Pigott; 19 June 1929 (age 97); Middlesbrough, North Riding of Yorkshire, England
- Occupations: Actress, writer
- Years active: 1954–present
- Known for: Role of Mavis Wilton in Coronation Street
- Television: Coronation Street (1971–1997); Dinnerladies (1998–2000)
- Spouse: Graham Barlow (m. 1956; div. 1983)
- Children: 2

Thelma Barlow (née Pigott; born 19 June 1929) is an English television actress and writer, known for her roles as Mavis Wilton in the long-running ITV soap opera Coronation Street and as Dolly Bellfield in the BBC One sitcom dinnerladies.

== Early life ==
Barlow was born in 1929 in Middlesbrough, North Riding of Yorkshire, the youngest of two daughters. Her father, Tommy, a cabinet maker, died of pneumonia five weeks before her birth, aged 37, and Barlow was brought up by her mother Margaret.

During her childhood, the family moved to Huddersfield, West Riding of Yorkshire. Barlow left school at 15 and went to Huddersfield Technical College to study shorthand and typing. Her first job was as a secretary, which she held for eight years and at the same time belonged to Huddersfield Thespians, an amateur dramatics group.

== Early theatre ==
Barlow decided to take up acting professionally and joined the Joan Littlewood Theatre Group. During the 1950s she did rep in Liverpool, Nottingham and Birmingham. In 1960 Barlow joined the West of England Theatre Company, followed by the Bristol Old Vic Theatre Company. In Bristol, she ran a boarding house for fellow actors.

== Career ==
Barlow's earlier television appearances included a part in 1967's Vanity Fair. In 1971, while performing in Liverpool, she was asked to audition for the soap opera Coronation Street, for the role of Mavis Riley. She was successful, and her first episode was transmitted on 11 August 1971, though the character only appeared regularly from 4 June 1973, where she joined Barbara Knox, who played Rita Fairclough, in The Kabin. Barlow remained in the series for 26 years, appearing in 1,787 episodes, until she left the show following the departure of her on-screen husband Derek. Her final episode was broadcast 10 October 1997, when Mavis moved to the Lake District. During her time on Coronation Street, Barlow shared a flat with co-star Helen Worth and later moved to Settle, North Yorkshire, where she later did a television programme from her garden. In 2020, Barlow revealed that, despite being asked to return to Coronation Street, "two or three times", she has declined, "because I feel I've packed Mavis away in a box now. I don't think I’d know how to do her anyway. Maybe a good script would make me realise how I'd played the part." In 2024, she appeared on Good Morning Britain and said "it would be the pressure of the work that would frighten me to death".

In 1990, Barlow appeared as a contestant on Cluedo, facing off against Ned Sherrin. Barlow's next major role was that of Dolly Bellfield in Victoria Wood's sitcom dinnerladies, which ran for two series from 1998 to 2000. In 1999 she appeared in Murder Most Horrid and David Copperfield. Since then Barlow has appeared as one-off characters in several television shows, including Fat Friends (2000), Doctors (2002), The Royal (2004), Where the Heart Is (2004), Agatha Christie's Marple (2006), the Midsomer Murders episode "Last Year's Model" (2006) and Doc Martin (2007). In 2005, she played her first film role in Mrs Henderson Presents, for which she was nominated "Most Promising Newcomer" at the British Independent Film Awards 2005. In 2007 she portrayed Lady Thaw in the Doctor Who episode "The Lazarus Experiment". In 2016, she had a small speaking role in the film Florence Foster Jenkins.

Since her departure from Coronation Street, Barlow has acted on radio, and made stage appearances, with roles such as Madame Arcati in Blithe Spirit, Mam in Alan Bennett's Enjoy and as Abby Brewster in Arsenic and Old Lace in 2003 on the West End stage. She wrote a book about organic gardening, a pastime of hers, which was first published by Robson Books as Organic Gardening with Love (1992) and re-issued in paperback under the title Gardening Nature's Way (ISBN 978-1861053312).

In June 2014, Barlow narrated a 30-minute documentary, Gail & Me: 40 Years on Coronation Street, which celebrated Helen Worth's career on Coronation Street as Gail Platt. Barlow made a guest appearance on Coronation Street Icons: Norris Cole, a 2021 television documentary about the character played by Malcolm Hebden, after the actor's retirement.

In 2024, Barlow came out of retirement and returned to acting in a short film, Sleepless In Settle. Directed by Judy Flynn and filmed in the town of Rye, East Sussex, Barlow played Barbara, a woman who is trying to find a wife for her son.

== Personal life ==
She married Graham Barlow in 1956; their marriage produced two sons. The couple divorced in 1983. Barlow maintained her married name, since all of her television and film credits, until her divorce and after, have been as Thelma Barlow. In 2003, Barlow moved to the Isle of Purbeck. She currently lives in Faversham, Kent.

== Filmography ==
Year	Title	Role	Notes
1958	The Desk Set	Ruthie Saylor	Television film
1961	Theatre Night	Edna Fuller	Episode: "Celebration"
1967	Vanity Fair	Mrs Briggs	2 episodes
1970	A Stranger on the Hills	Mistress Fetterlock	3 episodes
1971	The Stalls of Barchester	Letitia Hayes	Television film
1971–1997	Coronation Street	Mavis Riley/Wilton	1,207 episodes
1973	Love Story	Doreen Truscott	Episode: "Two Tame Oats"
1973	Adam Smith	Mrs Patterson	Series 2 episode 27
1990	Cluedo		Series 1 episode 3
1995	Coronation Street: The Feature Length Special	Mavis Wilton	Video-only release
1998	Creche Landing		Voice only; television film
1998–2000	Dinnerladies	Dolly Bellfield	16 episodes
1999	Murder Most Horrid	Tiffany's mother	Episode: "Dinner at Tiffany's"
1999	David Copperfield	Mrs Heep	Episode 2
2000	Fat Friends	Mrs Ashburn	Episode: "Fat Chance"
2000	King's Ransom	Ethel	Short film
2002	Stig of the Dump	Miss Hardwick	Episode: "Undercover"
2002	Sweet Charity	Jan	
2002	Doctors	Jenny Edwards	Episode: "Swing Out Sister"
2004	The Royal	Ada	Episode: "Holding on Tight"
2004	Where the Heart Is	Helen Ashworth	Episode: "Stormy Weather"
2004	My Dad's the Prime Minister	Old Lady	Episode: "Election"
2005	Mrs Henderson Presents	Lady Conway	
2006	Agatha Christie's Marple	Emily Barton	Episode: "The Moving Finger"
2006	Midsomer Murders	Mrs Beverley	Episode: "Last Year's Model"
2007	Doctor Who	Lady Thaw	Episode: "The Lazarus Experiment"
2007	Doc Martin	Beth Sawle	Episode: "Nowt So Queer"
2008	Is Anybody There?	Ena	
2014	Gail & Me: 40 Years on Coronation Street	Narrator	
2016	Florence Foster Jenkins	Mrs Oscar Garmunder	
2021	Coronation Street Icons: Norris Cole	Herself	
2023	Barbara Knox at 90	Herself	
2024	Sleepless In Settle	Barbara	Short film

== Honours ==
Barlow was awarded the Honorary degree of Doctor of Letters (D.Litt) from Teesside University on 21 November 2008.
