= Jack Duckworth =

Fictional character from Coronation Street

- Coronation Street character
- Portrayed by: Bill Tarmey
- Duration: 1979, 1981–2010
- First appearance: Episode 1947; 28 November 1979
- Last appearance: Episode 7464; 8 November 2010
- Introduced by: Bill Podmore (1979, 1981)
- Book appearances: Coronation Street: The Complete Saga
- Spin-off appearances: Coronation Street: Viva Las Vegas! (1997)
In-universe information
- Other names: John Harold Duckworth
- Occupation: Retired
- Father: Harry Duckworth
- Mother: Maggie Duckworth
- Brothers: Clifford Duckworth
- Wife: Vera Burton (until 2008)
- Sons: Terry Duckworth
- Grandsons: Paul Clayton; Tommy Duckworth; Brad Armstrong
- Uncles: Jim
- Aunts: Elsie; Florence

Jack Duckworth is a fictional character from the British ITV soap opera Coronation Street, played by Bill Tarmey. The character debuted on-screen during the episode broadcast on 28 November 1979. Jack was introduced by executive producer Bill Podmore. Tarmey had previously appeared as a background character in many episodes featuring scenes in the Rovers Return, including some occasional speaking lines.

More than twenty years after first appearing, Tarmey eventually cut down filming due to problems with his health and often contemplated leaving the series. In April 2010, it was announced that Tarmey would leave the series for good later that year. His last appearance was broadcast on 8 November 2010, with ITV also airing a tribute documentary for him. Having been in the show for 31 years, he was one of the longest-serving characters.

Jack's storylines have focused on his long-standing marriage to his wife Vera Duckworth (Liz Dawn) which has been complex and at times been described as "rocky". Other storylines include coping with his wayward son Terry (Nigel Pivaro) and his hobby for pigeon keeping. In his final storyline, he was portrayed as having incurable non-Hodgkin lymphoma. Jack has been characterized through his "joyless and gloomy" life in which he has a string of dead-end jobs and his wife's death, but continued to pass witty remarks on life. Television critics have described Jack as a loveable rogue type character and have favoured his relationship with Vera. His exit storyline was fairly documented in the media, receiving positive reactions and many state he is fondly remembered for his love of pigeons.

== Creation ==
=== Casting and introduction ===
Unlike the creation process with many other roles, no auditions were held for the part of Jack. Actor William Tarmey had previously been an extra in the serial, and in 1978 he played the small credited part of "Jack Rowe". He was offered the guest role of Jack Duckworth for two episodes in November 1979. Of his previous credits, Tarmey states: "I'd worked on Coronation Street for about ten years throwing darts in the background and whilst doing that I was doing little cameo parts, on other programmes." Tarmey was later asked back for a handful of episodes in 1981 and was eventually asked to become a regular cast member a year later. Tarmey had prepared for this with the help of fellow cast members and of this he adds: "I've had so many helping hands through the years from Jean [Alexander] and Liz [Dawn] and Julie [Goodyear] and Bill [Roache] [who played Hilda Ogden, Vera Duckworth, Bet Lynch and Ken Barlow respectively], from them all".

=== Characterisation ===
ITV publicity describe him as being fond of pigeons and betting whilst disliking household chores. Stuart Heritage of newspaper The Guardian describes Jack as having "a constant downbeat aura of a person who knows that his entire life has been a joyless procession of gloomy disappointments." Another reporter of the newspaper, Mark Lawson, described Jack as "A pigeon-fancying, flat-cap-wearing, wise-cracking, philandering, Sinatra-loving Lancashire lad, Jack epitomised the vivid character comedy in which the serial specialises."

In 1991 Tarmey spoke of Jack's changes in attitude over his early years in the book Life on the Street. "Jack has settled down and matured a bit, he has accepted things with a kind of middle-aged resignation", Tarmey stated. He also branded Jack's days of chasing "birds" as over and some of his greatest loves as being "booze and barmaids". Jack has a "strange moral code" when it comes to his marriage. Tarmey brands one of Jack's good qualities as being the fact he is not a thief, but did add "He regards stealing Alec Gilroy's (Roy Barraclough) beer as one of the perks of his job".

== Development ==
=== "Jack and Vera" ===
Jack's relationship with Vera Burton (Liz Dawn) was always up and down, they had a rocky marriage and sometimes Jack appeared to show little care for her. Tarmey describes the first few decades in the following manner: "He would never knowingly hurt people and he loves Vera, although he doesn't always like her. He will defend her to the death, unless the chap slagging her off is bigger than he is! Jack is not a thief either!" In their "hey-day" they were dubbed as the modern day Stan (Bernard Youens) and Hilda Ogden (Jean Alexander) In their early days, Jack and Vera both had their fair share of dalliances. In 1982, whilst Vera was entertaining her own boyfriend, Jack had developed an attraction towards Bet Lynch (Julie Goodyear). Tarmey recalls the scenes in which Jack and Bet flirt, stating he was nervous and had to have Goodyear's help. They believed the storyline was a turning point for the two and was written with wit. Dawn opines: "It was very cleverly written, because Vera knew that Jack had a girlfriend on the side but she didn't know the other woman was Bet. So she chose Bet as someone to confide in, and she really opened her heart. It was quite moving as well as funny." This led to a classic showdown in the Rovers.

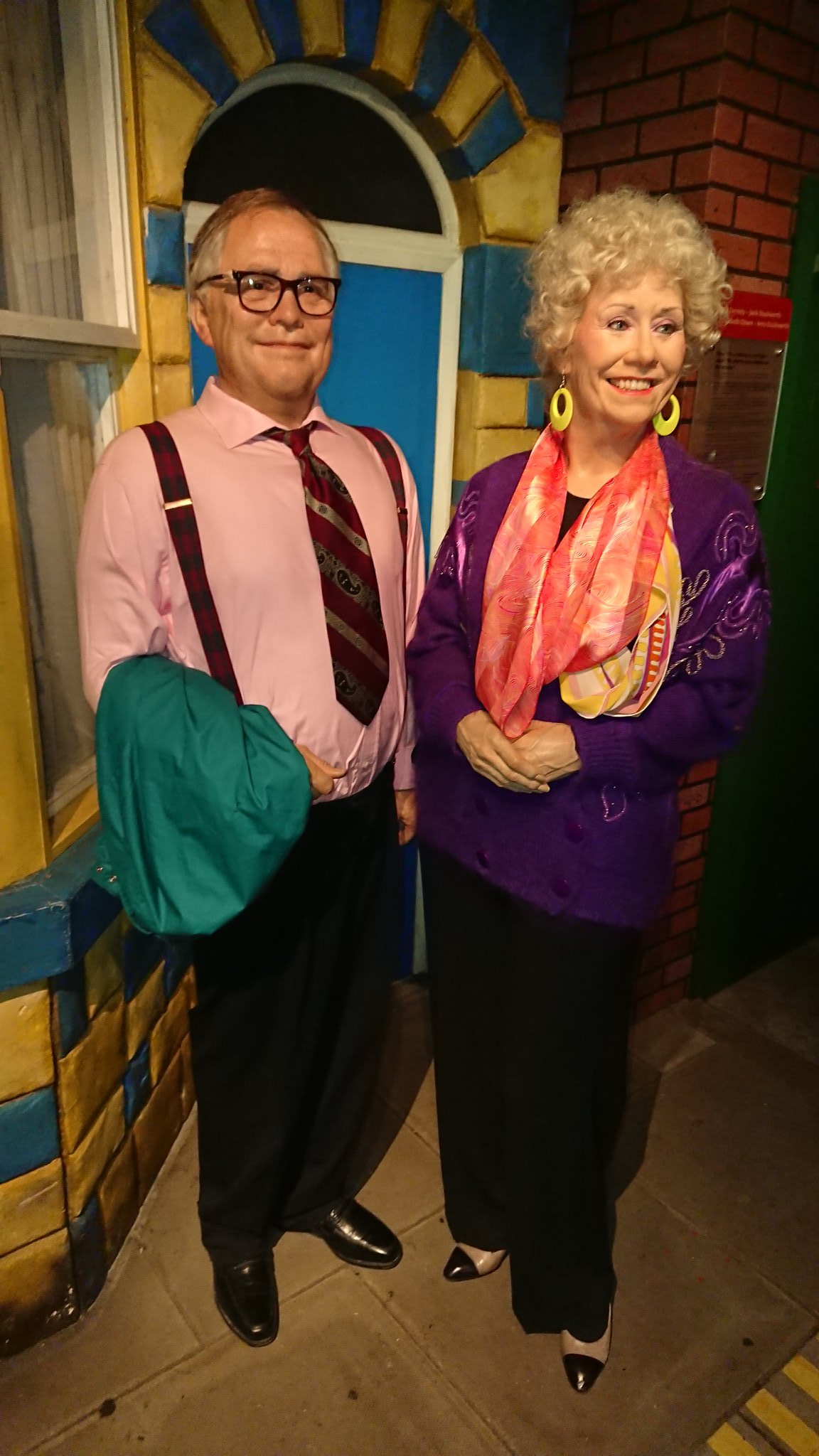
Jack and Vera Duckworth waxworks at Madame Tussauds in Blackpool, Lancashire – 2018

In another storyline Jack's son Terry sells his baby Tommy Duckworth (Darryl Edwards), leaving Jack and Vera devastated. When Jack and Vera realise what he has done, Jack punches Terry. The scenes made viewers happy to see Terry getting what hurt. Tarmey himself felt sadness because he knew how Jack felt: "When I first saw the script I was very sad [...] I worked out the punch with Nigel and I missed him by a whisker. Since then I've had letters saying "Well done for cracking him one" from little old ladies, young women, kids, guys."

On 8 November 2010 Tarmey made his final appearance, with Jack dying in his armchair at his old Coronation Street house, following a birthday party at the Rovers. In Jack's final death scene he sees visions of Vera, which Dawn returned to film. Producer Phil Collinson explained why they decided to include her: "It's something I've heard a lot. People say, 'When my mother was dying she saw my father' [...] It's a story I've heard a few people say. We're storytellers at the end of the day. Yes it's Coronation Street and yes it reflects real life, but we're storytellers." Whilst Executive producer Kieran Roberts opined that he would be surprised if anyone thought it was the wrong decision.

=== Departure ===
In 1997, executive producer Brian Park axed a number of characters; Tarmey has stated he was so tired of seeing his fellow cast members worrying about their jobs that he asked to be written out, but Park decided to keep him on. In 2001, the serial imposed a series of cuts on salaries as part of cost-cutting efforts. This resulted in Tarmey considering leaving, but producers decided against lowering his salary and convinced him to stay. In 2004, Tarmey extended his contract further along with his on-screen wife Dawn. In June 2008, he spoke of his desire to continue in the role.

From September 2009 onwards, Tarmey filmed on an episodic basis. In a storyline, Jack moved away from Coronation Street but continued to make occasional appearances at the Rovers and in the cafe. The reason for this was due to Tarmey's increasing health problems. On 9 April 2010, it was announced that Bill Tarmey had quit his role of Jack in the show's fiftieth anniversary year. Speaking of his decision to quit, Tarmey stated: "I've had the most amazing 30 years playing Jack. Because of him I've made fantastic friends and travelled all over the world. I'll be sorry to say goodbye." Filming Jack's final scenes upset Tarmey, of this he stated: "It was delightful. And very moving. It was a case of 'Pass the hand towel' [...] you know, filming those scenes was difficult. I'm leaving my other family. I've worked with all these people for 30-odd years and it was impossible for me to act or watch the death scene and cut that off."

== Storylines ==
Whilst Jack is working a fairground ride, the waltzer, he meets Vera Burton (Liz Dawn), and they soon begin a relationship. When Vera announces that she is pregnant with his baby, Jack agrees to marry her. Even after discovering this is a false alarm, Jack still takes her hand in marriage. During a trip to the United States, Jack confesses to being two years younger than Vera is aware, as he had lied at their wedding, making out that he was older than he really was in an attempt to impress a young Vera. Since they had not been legally married, they make their marriage official by tying the knot in the famous Little White Wedding Chapel in Las Vegas. A pregnant Vera gives birth to a son, whom they named Terry (Nigel Pivaro).

Jack makes his first appearance on 28 November 1979 when Vera forces him to attend the wedding of her friend and colleague Ivy Tilsley's (Lynne Perrie) son Brian (Christopher Quinten) to Gail Potter (Helen Worth). He returns in 1981 and for almost two years, appears on a recurring basis. Jack and Vera move into the street in 1983, much to the dismay of many of Weatherfield's residents. Prior to Jack's 1979 debut, Bill Tarmey often appeared as an extra in The Rovers Return Inn, playing darts. Jack later has an affair with Bet Lynch (Julie Goodyear), which he later regrets. Jack enrols with a video dating agency in 1983, referring to himself as "Vince St. Clair" and obtains a white suit, gold medallion and phoney trans-Atlantic accent. Vera also takes part in this. She refers to herself as "Carole Munroe", and is shocked when she sees Jack's video. She arranges to meet him in The Rovers Return, wearing a ginger wig, claiming to be a rich widow. When she turns around, Jack is shocked to see his wife staring back at him and she chases him out of the pub much to the amusement of the other customers.

Jack Duckworth as he appeared in 1982.

Vera is almost tempted into having an affair with Lestor Fontaine, but is soon to realise that she cannot leave Jack. In 2000, Vera worries that she may die in an operation, and confesses to Jack that she had an affair during the early years of their marriage, meaning there is a possibility that Terry is not really Jack's son. Jack confesses to his friend Curly Watts (Kevin Kennedy) that unbeknownst to Vera, he had knowledge of the affair, and had beaten her lover up; though he claims that he believes Terry to be his own son as he reminds him too much of himself.

Terry causes trouble for Jack and Vera through his various relationships with women. He dates neighbour Andrea Clayton (Caroline O'Neill) in 1985 and she becomes pregnant, sparking a feud between the Claytons and the Duckworths. At Ivy's engagement party to George Wardle in The Rovers, Jack asks Andrea's father Harry Clayton (Johnny Leeze) if they are sure Terry is the father and Harry punches him. The Claytons later move away. In 1992, Terry is released from prison to marry his pregnant girlfriend Lisa Horton (Caroline Milmoe) and uses the ceremony to escape. Lisa moves to Weatherfield from her home town of Blackpool and begins a relationship with local bookie Des Barnes (Philip Middlemiss) and moves in with him, a decision which infuriates Vera. While Jack is more sympathetic towards Lisa, knowing Terry will never stand by his wife and child, he nonetheless feels he has to side with his wife. Lisa gives birth to a baby boy whom she names Tommy and five months later, Lisa is killed after being run over by a car, and Jack and Vera are delighted when Tommy comes to live with them. Jack and Vera find it hard to cope financially, but Terry takes Tommy off of them and sells him to Lisa's parents Jeff and Doreen Horton and he goes to live with them in Blackpool. Jack and Vera are devastated and a furious argument with Terry follows, resulting in Jack punching Terry and disowning him. Jack and Vera had another grandson, Brad, after Terry's fling with Tricia Armstrong (Tracy Brabin). Jack also develops a paternal relationship with Tricia's son from her first marriage, Jamie (Joseph Gilgun).

"I loved the scene in the Duckworths' front room when Jack was cradling Tommy in his arms. He was singing him his favourite Sinatra songs and Tommy dropped off to sleep. This scene was absolutely delightful. I love kids, and during the scene Tommy was just like one of my own grandchildren."

— Tarmey remembers the realism of a 1992 episode of the serial. (1997).

Jack and Vera later became surrogate parents for Tyrone Dobbs (Alan Halsall), whose mother had been imprisoned for assault. Jack considers Tyrone as more of a son than Terry had ever been. Jack is fond of pigeons though Vera hates them, and she once tricks him into believing that she has cooked him a pigeon pie. Jack once agrees to sell his dead body for a large amount of cash to an artist (Maggie McCarthy) who enjoys painting stuffed humans, so he could buy Vera a Christmas present. When Vera discovers this, she argues with the woman, who then turns up, inspired by Vera. They agree to both pose nude for the artist, but on condition that they would be buried as normal. The Duckworths celebrate their Golden wedding anniversary with a party at The Rovers in August 2007. After the couple plan to relocate to Blackpool, Jack discovers Vera has died in her sleep in her armchair on 18 January 2008, devastating many of Weatherfield's residents. This prompts Jack to abandon the move to Blackpool and stay in Weatherfield, although he still offers No. 9 to Tyrone and his girlfriend Molly Compton (Vicky Binns); though they insist that he remain as a lodger. Months later, Jack's grandson Paul Clayton (Tom Hudson), having returned to Weatherfield previously, confesses to the police to burning down Valandro's, Leanne Battersby's (Jane Danson) restaurant. He also confesses this to Jack who is disgusted with his grandson's behaviour and tells him that he is Terry's son. Despite his disgust, Jack offers Paul £10,000 that he has received from the house, on the condition that Paul faces prison. However, Paul cannot face it and decides to flee the country. This reassures Jack that Paul is different from Terry. When Molly's aunt Pam Hobsworth (Kate Anthony) later moves into No. 9, Jack decides to spend a few months in Blackpool. Upon his return, he describes at Tyrone and Molly's wedding in January 2009 that Tyrone is the son he and Vera had always wanted. Later that year, Jack meets Connie Rathbone (Rita May), a widow and fellow pigeon enthusiast. The two become good friends, although Tyrone feels that Jack's behaviour is disrespectful to the memory of Vera. Jack soon goes on holiday with Connie to Spain and lies to Tyrone and Molly that he is returning to Blackpool. When he comes back, Tyrone discovers the truth and is unhappy with Jack. Tyrone begins to soften towards Connie but is still shocked when Jack announces that he is moving in with Connie and he leaves Weatherfield on 21 September 2009.

Following his moving in with Connie, Jack's appearances on the show became intermittent. In November 2009, Jack and Connie join Tyrone in the Rovers for a drink. After Connie leaves, Jack tells Tyrone that he is worried that she wants more than companionship. Jack then hides out at Tyrone's until Connie catches up with him and reveals it is only a misunderstanding about her sleepwalking, much to Jack's relief. Jack and Connie join Tyrone, Bill Webster (Peter Armitage) and Pam on Christmas Day 2009. Jack is present once again in early-2010, when Molly and Tyrone are having marriage difficulties and is seen in the Rovers after the funeral of Blanche Hunt (Maggie Jones) in May 2010. Jack appears on 9 September 2010 to visit Molly, after she has just given birth, and is told her and Tyrone's son will be named Jack in honour of him. In October 2010, Jack moves back in with Tyrone and Molly and they suspect that he has fallen out with Connie. Jack initially tells Tyrone that he has simply missed living with them both. However, when Connie turns up at the house and cryptically demands why Jack hasn't told them the real reason for his stay, he is forced to reveal the truth. On 8 October 2010, Jack tells Tyrone that he has an incurable form of non-Hodgkin lymphoma and only has weeks to live, leaving Tyrone devastated. He returns to No. 9 to live out the remainder of his days, and makes Tyrone promise that they will make the most of his last few weeks. During his final weeks, Jack strives to perform acts of kindness for those around him. He sends Sally Webster (Sally Dynevor) tickets for the opera after hearing her say that she always wanted to go. After seeing Emily Bishop (Eileen Derbyshire) collecting money in the Rovers to repair the roof of the local church, he anonymously donates over £2,000 to the fund. When Ashley Peacock (Steven Arnold) confides in Jack about problems that he is having with his wife Claire (Julia Haworth), he attempts to reconcile the couple by encouraging them to talk to one another. After baby Jack's christening on 5 November 2010, Jack is devastated when he overhears a conversation between Molly and Kevin Webster (Michael Le Vell), in which Kevin reveals that he is the father of baby Jack, and not Tyrone as the result of the affair they had.

On 8 November 2010, Tyrone organises a party for Jack's 74th birthday in the Rovers Return. Jack reveals to Molly that he overheard her and Kevin discussing baby Jack's paternity. Jack does not condemn Molly and he admits he and Vera had both done the same as she had to each other, but tells her that Tyrone never would and pleads with her to move the family away from Weatherfield. Later, after seeing Tyrone and Molly happy together with baby Jack, he decides to quietly slip out of his own party saying his final words to Peter Barlow (Chris Gascoyne) and then waving goodbye to Ken Barlow (William Roache), who raises a glass to him as he leaves. Jack goes home and whilst listening to a Matt Monro record "Softly As I Leave You", which Tyrone had given him as a present, he dies in his armchair and is joined by the ghost of Vera, who tells him off, yet again, for his scruffy appearance. She tells Jack she'll be late for a bus and Jack's spirit leaves his body and gets out of his chair and dances with Vera and they share a kiss. Some time later, Tyrone, Molly and Connie return home to find Jack dead in his chair, and a tearful Tyrone says his last words to him "Good Night Dad". Jack and Vera's ashes are later scattered off one of Blackpool's Piers by Tyrone and Connie.

== Reception ==
In January 1985, David Porter of current affairs magazine, Third Way, criticised Coronation Street's attitude towards employment, stating that being unemployed seemed to not be a problem for some characters as they were either "loved layabouts" or "acknowledged rogues", like Jack. In Dorothy Catherine Anger's book Other worlds: society seen through soap opera she brands Jack as one of the "middle aged men" who "over the years have, stymied their wives' efforts to be accepted as respectable". Dorothy Hobson in her book Soap Opera stated that marriages never seem to last in the genre, but added that Jack and Vera were an exception, in her opinion it was because although he loved her, he was terrified of sex. Ian Wylie of The Guardian branded Jack and Vera as "one of TV drama's most enduring – and real – double acts". Channel Five's soap opera reporting website Holy Soap brands Jack's most memorable moments as being "his Vince St Clair alias" and "when Jack returned home to find Vera had died in her sleep." The website has also branded him a "pigeon fancier" What's on TV describe Jack stating: "Had a famously rocky marriage to Vera but widower Jack Duckworth (William Tarmey) has mellowed over the years. Once a bit of a jack-the-lad, he's now more of a 'Jack the kipper', as he's enjoying retirement and taking life easy."

TV critic Jim Shelley for the Daily Mirror spoke of his regret that Jack Duckworth would be leaving the show: "Soap characters come and go, but it's a genuine shame that, after 31 years, Bill Tarmey is finally leaving Coronation Street. It's hard to think of a more popular or nicer character than Jack Duckworth. Decent people are few and far between in soaps. Viewers loved Stan and Hilda Ogden for example. But you couldn't say that they were as warm or reassuring a presence as Jack. Of course he was part of one of the great loving couples/double acts in Street history." 11.64 million viewers tuned in to see Jack's final appearance.

Jack's final scenes on the show were praised by fans and critics alike. Jim Shelley called Jack's death scene with the ghostly appearance of Vera, "one [of] the most moving scenes ever seen in soap". Mark Lawson of The Guardian described Jack and Vera's last dance as a great piece of social realism. As a tribute to the character ITV broadcast a short documentary profiling Jack's life in the serial. 7 million viewers tuned into watch the show. Stuart Heritage of The Guardian stated that Jack had iconic accessories which are his "golden-era glasses" stuck together with Elastoplast and his vest. They also commented on his pigeon keeping hobby, stating: "Forget Vera Duckworth, the one true love of Jack's life was his flock of pigeons." Lucy Mangan writing for The Guardian reviewed the serial's theatrical piece Corrie!, stating: "The scene in which Terry arrives to take his son away from grandparents Jack and Vera is enough to precipitate a Proustian rush of tearful memories. All those years of misery the wretched Terry caused his parents – oh, Jack's bitter resignation! – come flooding back." In the Morley Observer & Advertiser a columnist expressed their disappointment Jack and Vera were onscreen when he wanted to watch football and opined "difference is that the dramatic acting in the football is better". In a 2021 Radio Times poll, Jack and Vera were voted as the joint fifth "soap pub landlord", receiving 6% of the votes.

== In popular culture ==
Jack appears in a theatrical version of the story of Coronation Street titled "Corrie!" in which Jack and Vera are shown as Terry sells their grandchild.
