= List of Coronation Street characters introduced in 1997 =

The following is a list of characters that first appeared in the ITV soap opera Coronation Street in 1997, by order of first appearance.

== Brad Armstrong ==
Brad Armstrong
- Coronation Street character
- Portrayed by: Caleb Flanagan
- First appearance: 16 February 1997
- Last appearance: 2 May 1997
- Introduced by: Brian Park
In-universe information
- Father: Terry Duckworth
- Mother: Tricia Armstrong
- Half-brothers: Paul Clayton; Tommy Duckworth; Jamie Armstrong
- Grandfathers: Jack Duckworth
- Grandmothers: Vera Duckworth

Brad Armstrong is the son of Terry Duckworth (Nigel Pivaro) and Tricia Armstrong (Tracy Brabin). He is born on 14 February 1997 and named after Brad Pitt. Three months after his birth, his mother leaves with him.

== Chris Collins ==
Chris Collins
- Coronation Street character
- Portrayed by: Matthew Marsden
- Duration: 1997–1998
- First appearance: 3 March 1997
- Last appearance: 29 March 1998
- Introduced by: Brian Park
In-universe information
- Occupation: Mechanic

Chris Collins is a mechanic played by Matthew Marsden. Chris, a former soldier, makes his first appearance in March 1997 when he arrives at Webster's Autos looking for work, and when Chris demonstrates his abilities, Kevin Webster (Michael Le Vell) gives him a job.

During his time on the Street and unbeknownst to his boss Kevin, Chris has a passionate affair with Kevin's wife Sally (Sally Dynevor). Sally takes revenge for Kevin's affair with Natalie Horrocks (Denise Welch) by seducing Chris. He ends his relationship with Sally after she and Kevin get back together. Chris then has a fling with barmaid Samantha Failsworth (Tina Hobley). When he decides to leave Weatherfield, Samantha intends on coming with him and packs a bag for herself, but in the end Chris does not call round for her and leaves on his own without telling anyone. Chris's current whereabouts are unknown.

== Carol Delaney ==
Carol Delaney
- Coronation Street character
- Portrayed by: Niamh Daley
- Duration: 1997–2000
- First appearance: 20 April 1997
- Last appearance: 25 December 2000
- Introduced by: Brian Park
In-universe information
- Occupation: Nurse

Nurse Carol Delaney, portrayed by Niamh Daley, was a nurse at Weatherfield General, and was also a good friend of Martin Platt (Sean Wilson). She first appeared as a nurse taking care of Alma Baldwin (Amanda Barrie) following a car accident after being kidnapped by Don Brennan (Geoff Hinsliff).

In June 2000, Carol told Martin that his mistress Rebecca Hopkins (Jill Halfpenny) was leaving for Dubai. He asked Carol where she was, and he headed to the airport and tried to make her stay, but Rebecca told him she did not want to split up his family, and left him. During the Christmas period, Martin shockingly discovered that Rebecca was staying at Carol's home. He tried visiting her for Christmas, but after seeing her kissing another bloke, he left.

== Zoe Tattersall ==
Zoe Tattersall
- Coronation Street character
- Portrayed by: Joanne Froggatt
- Duration: 1997–1998
- First appearance: 19 May 1997
- Last appearance: 16 December 1998
- Introduced by: Brian Park
In-universe information
- Daughters: Shannon Tattersall

Zoe Tattersall, played by Joanne Froggatt, made her first screen appearance on 19 May 1997. Jane Danson and Georgia Taylor auditioned for the role of Zoe, before being cast as the Battersby sisters, Leanne and Toyah.

Zoe is a troubled teenage tearaway. She has enough of children's care homes and runs away, living on the streets with her boyfriend, Liam Shepherd. The character first appears in the amusement arcade where Judy Mallett (Gaynor Faye) works. Liam causes trouble and one day Gary (Ian Mercer) throws the teenager out but he decides to blackmail the Malletts, threatening to go to the police. They need money as Zoe is pregnant. Judy, struggling with fertility issues, offers Zoe £2,000 if she will allow her and Gary to adopt her baby. Zoe is overwhelmed but accepts the offer, despite Gary's objection. The neighbours assume that Gary is the baby's father and Judy allows them to think that, deciding it would help if anyone asked why they had the baby. Zoe soon makes friends with Leanne Battersby and tells her the real story, including the payment.

The baby arrives and Judy wants Zoe to move on as she is showing signs of bonding with little Katy Joyce. Gary fraudulently signs the birth certificate as the father and Judy settles into new motherhood with Zoe resentfully looking on in the background. After the health visitor's first visit, Zoe is persuaded to leave but the Malletts tell people that Zoe stole some money and ran away but Leanne tells Nick Tilsley (Adam Rickitt) the truth. Leanne finds Zoe and persuades her to come back and clear her name.

Meanwhile, Ashley Peacock (Steven Arnold), working in the corner shop, develops feelings for Zoe. Finally, after the christening, Gary and Judy are so worried about Zoe that they plan to leave Weatherfield but Zoe snatches her baby with Ashley's help, renaming her Shannon. Zoe and Shannon move in with Ashley, Leanne and Nick and live together until Shannon is rushed to hospital with meningitis and dies. Zoe is devastated and has a breakdown, lashing out at her friends and neighbours, resulting in her being sectioned for a while. During this time, Ashley realises that though he loves Zoe, he cannot give her what she needs but won't finish with her. When she is released from hospital, she comes back to live with him.

Zoe meets a couple while out clubbing, Ben and Ruth. Ruth becomes her new best friend very quickly, making Ashley suspicious. They get Zoe a job at their "Foundation" and convince her to sell new age crystals on the street and door to door, while telling her about their beliefs and taking advantage of her grief for her baby. She is soon convinced that theirs is the road to salvation and becomes deeply involved in the Cult of Nirab. Despite his efforts, Ashley realises that Zoe has to make her own decisions. She needs a new start, wants to have a baby for the Foundation and leaves with Ben and Ruth in December 1998 and is never seen or heard from again. Years later Ashley mentions Zoe in conversation with wife, Claire Peacock (Julia Haworth), mentioning that she now lives in America.

== Liam Shepherd ==
Liam Shepherd
- Coronation Street character
- Portrayed by: Andrew Knott
- First appearance: 19 May 1997
- Last appearance: 22 December 1997
- Introduced by: Brian Park
In-universe information
- Daughters: Shannon Tattersall

Liam Shepherd, portrayed by Andrew Knott, was the boyfriend of Zoe Tattersall (Joanne Froggatt), who caused trouble at the arcade where Judy Mallett (Gaynor Faye) worked. He first appeared on 19 May 1997. He began to scare Judy, leading to her husband Gary Mallett (Ian Mercer) to threaten him. Liam later returned in a battered state, accusing Gary of attacking him and told Judy if she didn't give him money, he would report Gary. This story later turned out to be made up by Zoe and Liam as they wanted the money so Zoe could have an abortion. However, Zoe went on to have her baby and sold her to the Mallett's due to Judy's fertility problems. They subsequently named the baby Katie, however she was returned to Zoe in December 1997 and renamed Shannon.

Liam continuously tried to convince Zoe that she wasn't fit to be a parent as he himself didn't want to be a dad. As a result, he tried to sell Shannon to the Mallett's again, but eventually Zoe managed to get away from Liam as she wanted to keep her baby. Liam returned in December 1997 and tried to reconcile with Zoe by making another plan to sell Shannon to the Mallett's and then take the money to run off to pastures new. Zoe didn't like the plan and Liam then threatened to hit her. However, Zoe's good friend Ashley Peacock (Steven Arnold) managed to get him to leave. In April 1998, Shannon died of meningitis. Zoe tried to track Liam down form the funeral, but couldn't find him and therefore he didn't attend the service.

== Jon Lindsay ==
Jon Lindsay
- Coronation Street character
- Portrayed by: Owen Aaronovitch
- Duration: 1997–1998
- First appearance: 28 May 1997
- Last appearance: 17 April 1998
- Introduced by: Brian Park
In-universe information
- Occupation: Shop assistant
- Wife: Linda Lindsay; Mary Docherty (bigamous)

Jon Lindsay, played by Owen Aaronovitch, made his first screen appearance on 28 May 1997. Aaronovitch received the role after an audition. He later left the show to move to Spain with his wife. Paul Baldwin of The People praised the character, saying "Jon Lindsay is one of the scriptwriters' most intriguing characters for years." He also described Jon as a "love rat", "smooth-talking", a "slimeball" and a "creepy conman".

Jon meets Deirdre Rachid (Anne Kirkbride) at a singles night. He tells her he is a divorcee and an airline pilot. They spend more time together and start dating. While Ken Barlow (William Roache) is at Manchester Airport, he sees Jon working in a tie shop. Jon tells Deirdre that he had been forced to retire from his pilot job and was ashamed to admit that he now worked in a shop. Deirdre believes him, but Ken remains suspicious. Jon expresses his desire to live with Deirdre after he mentions his ex-wife has sold their house. They soon move in together. It emerges that Jon has stolen the identity of his friend Captain Ian Jenkins (Stephen Chapman) and still lives with his wife and children. He tells Deirdre that he needs to spend more time away due to a promotion. Jon and Deirdre get engaged, but she finds out about his wife and confronts him at his home. He denies knowing her. Jon applies for a credit card and a mortgage using a false identity, which he later signs into Deirdre's name. When the police question him, Jon lets Deirdre take the blame. He receives a suspended sentence, while Deirdre is charged and later sentenced to eighteen months in prison for fraud. When Mary Docherty (Victoria Alcock), a woman Jon had also duped, reads about Deirdre's trial, she comes forward and reveals that Jon is also a bigamist, having married her. Deirdre is released from jail, while Jon is arrested.

== Jez Quigley ==
Jez Quigley
- Coronation Street character
- Portrayed by: Lee Boardman
- Duration: 1997, 1999–2000
- First appearance: 6 June 1997
- Last appearance: 15 September 2000
- Introduced by: Brian Park (1997); Jane MacNaught (1999)
In-universe information
- Occupation: Gangster
- Mother: Margi Quigley
- Sisters: Jenny Quigley

Gerald Francis "Jez" Quigley was played by Lee Boardman. He made his first appearance in 1997, before later reappearing in 1999 and becoming the show's main antagonist up until he was ultimately killed-off in September 2000.

Hailed as one of the show's biggest villains to date, Jez was a notorious gangster and drug dealer who terrorized several characters in Weatherfield and went to extreme lengths in order to get the upper hand over those around him. He started out as an old friend of established protagonist Steve McDonald (Simon Gregson), but they soon fell out when Steve grassed Jez up to the police for his criminal activities; Jez was responsible for the death of local resident Des Barnes (Philip Middlemiss), personally killed his estranged stepson Tony Horrocks (Lee Warburton), turned fellow neighbour Leanne Battersby (Jane Danson) into a drug addict after supplying her with cocaine, and blackmailed Steve's business partner Vikram Desai (Chris Bisson) over money debt problems.

Steve ended up testifying against Jez in the courtroom where Tony's grieving mother Natalie (Denise Welch), also Des' widow, sought justice for the murders of both her late son and husband respectively. Unfortunately, despite Steve's testimony, Jez was found not guilty and sought revenge on Steve for his betrayal after being released from custody. Jez later arranged for Steve to get ambushed and beaten up by his gang in an underground car park, which resulted in Steve being hospitalised with serious injuries.

However, Jez's actions against Steve would cost him dearly. When Steve's father Jim (Charles Lawson) finds out what happened to his son, he seeks revenge on Jez and ambushes him in his flat when the latter arrives home that day. Things get violent between them when Jez attempts to attack Jim with a baseball bat, but Jim quickly turns the tables on Jez and violently beats him up to the point of brutally throwing him around the room. Jez is later put in the same hospital where Steve is and attempts to kill him in revenge for Jim's actions, but instead Jez dies of his injuries when he collapses on top of Steve in that moment. Jim later turns himself into the police for Jez's death, which he was found guilty of manslaughter and sentenced to eight years in prison; Jim is eventually released early for good behaviour, by which time Steve had already move forward from his ordeal with Jez after his death.

== Leanne Battersby ==
Leanne Anika Battersby, played by Jane Danson, made her first appearance on 4 July 1997. Danson left the series in 2000 and returned in 2004. Danson later took maternity leave in 2006 and returned in early 2007. Danson took another maternity break in 2009 and returned on the same year. Leanne's storylines include numerous affairs, prostitution, drug-abuse, insurance fraud, discovering her biological mother was Stella Price (Michelle Collins), a miscarriage, an abortion, and a custody battle for her step-son, Simon. Leanne has had numerous relationships within the show. She married Nick Tilsley in 1998, but they divorced a year later. She later married Peter Barlow (Chris Gascoyne) in the show's live 50th anniversary episode, but later split from him, after his affair with Carla Connor (Alison King) was exposed. After a volatile reconciliation, she and Nick married for the second time in January 2013. In late January 2014, Nick decided it was best for them to be apart, as he was suffering with long-term brain damage. In 2016, after a one-night stand, Leanne becomes pregnant with Steve McDonald's (Simon Gregson) baby. The baby is born the following year and named Oliver.

== Toyah Battersby ==
Toyah Battersby, played by Georgia Taylor, made her first screen appearance in 1997. The character and her family were created and introduced by executive producer Brian Park in a bid to increase falling ratings. Taylor was cast as the youngest member of the family, Toyah, and the role marked her acting debut. The actress described her character as being "gobby and cocky" and said that she often makes her parents' lives a misery. Charlie Catchpole from the Daily Mirror's commented that Toyah went "from lumpy, sulky schoolgirl to confident, radiant young woman" during her time in the show.

== Shannon Tattersall ==
Shannon Tattersall
- Coronation Street character
- Portrayed by: Lucy Whipday
- Duration: 1997–1998
- First appearance: 27 August 1997
- Last appearance: 17 April 1998
- Introduced by: Brian Park
In-universe information
- Other names: Katie Joyce Mallett
- Father: Liam Shepherd
- Mother: Zoe Tattersall
- Adoptive father: Gary Mallett (legal)

Shannon Tattersall (also Katie Joyce Mallett) is the daughter of wayward teenager Zoe Tattersall (Joanne Froggatt) and Liam Shepherd (Andrew Knott). Zoe fell pregnant by her ex-boyfriend; she did not want to be a mother and was planning to have the pregnancy terminated, but Judy Mallett (Gaynor Faye) – who was unable to have children – convinced her not to. Zoe then offered the Malletts £2,000 for her baby, and Judy hastily took the offer with a reluctant Gary Mallett (Ian Mercer) going on with the plan as well.

After drinking alcohol, Zoe gave birth to a baby girl by cesarean section prematurely in August 1997; Gary was present at the birth. He and Judy named the baby Katie Joyce Mallett, with her middle name being named after Judy's mother Joyce Smedley (Anita Carey), who was killed in a road accident months before. Both Judy and Zoe agreed that Gary must say he was Katie's father, so they do not raise suspicion with the residents.

Over time, Zoe began to change her mind about Katie being raised by the Malletts, so she admitted to new friend Leanne Battersby (Jane Danson) about selling her baby, and the mouthy teen confronted the Malletts, who accused Zoe of running away with the money. The young mother was left devastated when, after baby Katie's christening, the Malletts considered moving away from the street to keep the baby away from her. Meanwhile, Ashley Peacock (Steven Arnold) developed feelings for Zoe and helped her snatch her baby back.

In April 1998, Zoe was left devastated when her baby daughter tragically died of meningitis aged just eight months. After Katie's death, Zoe hit out at the people closest to her, eventually leading to her being sectioned. She was later moved to America.

== Lorraine Brownlow ==
Lorraine Brownlow
- Coronation Street character
- Portrayed by: Holly Newman
- Duration: 1997–1999
- First appearance: 3 November 1997
- Last appearance: 12 March 1999
- Introduced by: Brian Park (1997); David Hanson (1998)
In-universe information
- Occupation: Barmaid
- Aunts: Natalie Horrocks; Debs Brownlow
- First cousins: Tony Horrocks; Laura Horrocks

Lorraine Brownlow is the niece of Natalie Barnes (Denise Welch), played by actress Holly Newman between 1997 and 1999. Upon returning to Weatherfield in July 1998, Natalie hires Lorraine as a barmaid in The Rovers Return. In March 1999, after an argument with Natalie in which she calls her a "hard-faced cow", Natalie slaps Lorraine and sacks her from her job at The Rovers and she leaves.

== Spider Nugent ==
Spider Nugent
- Coronation Street character
- Portrayed by: Martin Hancock
- Duration: 1997–2001, 2003, 2022–2023
- First appearance: 15 December 1997
- Last appearance: 19 July 2023
- Introduced by: Brian Park (1997); Jane MacNaught (2001); Kieran Roberts (2003); Iain Macleod (2022)
In-universe information
- Occupation: Undercover police officer
- Father: Edgar Nugent
- Wife: Layla Nugent (2021–2023)
- Grandfathers: James Nugent
- Grandmothers: Agnes Nugent
- Aunts: Emily Bishop; Norah Seddon; Joan Corrie; Brenda Nugent; Marjorie Nugent

Geoffrey "Spider" Nugent, played by Martin Hancock, made his first screen appearance on 15 December 1997 and originally departed on 5 February 2003. Spider is Emily Bishop's (Eileen Derbyshire) nephew. The character was based on a real-life protester called Swampy. Spider was interested in the environment and green issues. He had a long-term relationship with Toyah Battersby (Georgia Taylor). Christine Smith from the Daily Mirror called Spider a "lovable eco-terrier". On 29 April 2022, it was announced Hancock had reprised the role for the character's 25th anniversary in July. Of his return, Hancock stated: "Having the opportunity to walk back onto the cobbles is fabulous, I'm so excited to be seeing a lot of old friends and picking up what Spider has been up to. I've always wanted to come back at some point and it just felt like this is the right time. I'm eternally grateful to [producer] Iain [Macleod] for the opportunity."

Spider arrives at Emily's house one day in December 1997, looking for a place to stay. Emily takes him in and they bond, also helping save the Red Rec from Alf Roberts (Bryan Mosley). Spider also falls in love with Toyah and they eventually become a couple after pitching a tent on the Red Rec to watch the 1999 eclipse. When Toyah escapes from her parents' home, she moves in with Spider and Emily, however Emily finds out that they are having sex with each other, and, displeased that the rules in her house regarding sex have been violated, tells them to find somewhere else to live. She, however, gradually begins to accept the relationship. Spider leaves for India in 2000. He returns the following year to ask Emily for help with his business plan.

When Emily is attacked by Richard Hillman (Brian Capron), Spider comes to visit her once again, and is with her when she recovers. Toyah, having been raped two years earlier, realises that she will not be able to get over the trauma, and Spider takes her with him. Around 2010, Spider and Toyah break up. In December 2015, it is revealed that Spider is in Peru doing charity work for environmental causes. Emily decides to join him, leaving Weatherfield on New Year's Day 2016.

In July 2022, Spider returned to Weatherfield where he turns up for a protest about recycling being sent to landfill. Toyah and Spider end up taking over a bin lorry. In September, it is later revealed that Spider had been married and is working as an undercover police officer, and he subsequently resumes his relationship with Toyah. Though working on a different case, he is blackmailed by fellow police officer DS Swain to get more information from Toyah, who later confesses to him that she deliberately caused the crash after learning that Imran had been having an affair with their neighbour Abi and had a child with her. The revelation later causes Spider and Toyah to split, but reunite following Toyah being found not guilty. Spider also tells DS Swain that he would always choose Toyah over the police and he intended to stay in Weatherfield.

Spider worked undercover in a racist gang led by Griff Reynolds in an attempt to expose them. In November 2022, Spider was present when Griff's gang attacked a man named Daryan Zahawi, but could do nothing to help him in order to avoid exposing his undercover role. Footage of the attack was seen by Toyah (who was unaware of Spider's undercover job), who confronted Spider, who was with Griff at the Rovers Return, for his involvement in the gang and ended their relationship when Spider pretended to justify Griff's actions in order to avoid Griff discovering his undercover role as Griff was beginning to doubt Spider due to him not getting involved with the gang's actions and for trying to discourage Max Turner (Paddy Bever) from joining in the activities of the gang.

The following month, he revealed to Toyah that he was working undercover for the police to infiltrate Griff and expose his activities. With Toyah promising to stick by him, the pair resumed their relationship.

In January 2023, Griff confronted Spider after discovering that he was an undercover police officer and attacked him with a crowbar. Peter Barlow (Chris Gascoyne) came to Spider's defence and called the police and took Spider to hospital. Toyah came to see Spider at the hospital where she was told by a doctor that he had a brain bleed. Spider later recovered and discharged himself from the hospital. Later, Griff went to Max's house to talk to him before getting into a fight with Max's stepfather David Platt (Jack P. Shepherd). Spider and the police come to Max and David's defence and arrest Griff.
