= List of Coronation Street characters introduced in 1994 =

The following is a list of characters that first appeared in the ITV soap opera Coronation Street in 1994, by order of first appearance.

== Eric Firman ==
Eric Firman
- Coronation Street character
- Portrayed by: Malcolm Terris
- Duration: 1994–1998
- First appearance: 24 January 1994
- Last appearance: 19 August 1998
- Introduced by: Sue Pritchard
In-universe information
- Occupation: Retail Manager
- Wife: Edith Firman
- Nephews: Leo Firman

Eric Firman, portrayed by Malcolm Terris, was the owner of Firman's Freezers who appeared on a recurring basis between 1994 and 1998. He first appeared as the best man at Reg Holdsworth's (Ken Morley) wedding to Maureen Naylor (Sherrie Hewson) in January 1994. This was mainly as part of a business launch and Eric was the guest of honour, although they knew each other through WARTS, they barely knew each other. In 1995, Eric encouraged Reg, who was manager of the Weatherfield branch of Firman's, to take on Curly Watts (Kevin Kennedy) as the assistant manager after working with him at Bettabuys. Later that year, he employed his nephew, Leo Firman (John Elmes) as the store manager, but later sacked him after Curly reported him for sexually harassing Anne Malone (Eve Steele) and Raquel Wolstenhulme (Sarah Lancashire), the latter he also attempted to rape and subsequently confided in him. In 1996, he accepted Curly's resignation and re-employed Reg as store manager and promoted Anne to assistant store manager.

In 1997, Eric took a liking to new shop worker, Alma Baldwin (Amanda Barrie) and made her employee of the month as well as putting up blown up photos of her around the shop, without her prior knowledge. After appointing her reluctantly as the face of Firman's Freezers, Eric used her poster to advertise their poorest selling stock, which succeeded in boosting sales. In 1998, Eric stood up against Spider Nugent (Martin Hancock), who objected to the sales of his Norwegian prawns on the grounds that it supported whaling. The insurance company refused to pay out after Spider sprayed the prawns with antifreeze. In August 1998, Eric sold Firman's Freezers to Freschco.

== Tricia Armstrong ==
Tricia Armstrong
- Coronation Street character
- Portrayed by: Tracy Brabin
- Duration: 1994–1997
- First appearance: 7 March 1994
- Last appearance: 2 May 1997
- Introduced by: Sue Pritchard
In-universe information
- Husband: Carl Armstrong (1983–93)
- Sons: Jamie Armstrong; Brad Armstrong

Tricia Armstrong, played by Tracy Brabin between 1994 and 1997. Brabin was Labour MP for Batley and Spen from 2016 to 2021, and following that became the inaugural Mayor of West Yorkshire; coincidentally, her last appearance as Tricia aired on 2 May 1997 – the day Tony Blair took office as prime minister.

Tricia first appeared when her son Jamie (Joe Gilgun) was accused of shoplifting at Bettabuys supermarket. Tricia befriended assistant manager Curly Watts (Kevin Kennedy) to get Jamie out of trouble and pleaded with Curly to go easy on him. Tricia developed an attraction to Curly and they began dating but the relationship ended when Tricia's ex-husband, Carl, assaulted Jack Duckworth (Bill Tarmey) who had been babysitting whilst she and Curly were out on a date.

In January 1995, Tricia and Jamie moved into No. 1 Coronation Street. Tricia befriended her neighbour Vera Duckworth (Liz Dawn), Jack's wife. Tricia was evicted by her landlord Mike Baldwin (Johnny Briggs) after giving him a good run for his money. Percy Sugden helped Tricia secure the house, meaning Mike could not get in, and Jamie even emptied a bowl of water over him whilst the rest of the street were all laughing. Despite this, Tricia and Jamie moved out after Deidre persuaded Mike to let her rent one of his flats he owned on Crimea Street. She befriended her new neighbour (after initial tension between the pair), Deirdre Rachid (Anne Kirkbride), who helped look after Jamie whilst Tricia worked. Facing financial difficulties, Tricia attempted to get money from Mike by offering to have sex with him but he refused. In January 1996, Tricia was imprisoned for a week for failing to pay a fine for her TV licence. On release, she was overjoyed to be reunited with Jamie. In May, Tricia's unemployment benefits were stopped when she was found to be working as a cleaner for Mike but this time Mike offered to help and gave her a job as a machinist at his factory.

In June, Tricia was attracted to Terry Duckworth (Nigel Pivaro), Jack and Vera's son, after he returned to Weatherfield. One night, Tricia got drunk in The Rovers and Terry took her home. Despite Tricia losing her keys, Terry used a credit card to help her gain entry to her flat and they slept together. As a result of this one-night stand, Tricia got pregnant but Terry was not interested in being a father. Jack and Vera let Tricia move into The Rovers with them and she gave birth unexpectedly to her son, Brad, on 14 February 1997 in the back of the pub. Jamie and barmaid Betty Williams (Betty Driver) helped deliver him. Shortly afterwards, Tricia met decorator Ray Thorpe. They became close and started dating but in April 1997, Terry returned to Weatherfield. Tricia realised that Terry would never be a good role model for her sons and after speaking to Jack, who understood her concerns about Terry and encouraged her to be with Ray, Tricia left Weatherfield with Ray to start a new life with him and her children.

== Jamie Armstrong ==
Jamie Armstrong
- Coronation Street character
- Portrayed by: Joe Gilgun
- Duration: 1994–1997
- First appearance: 7 March 1994
- Last appearance: 2 May 1997
- Introduced by: Sue Pritchard
In-universe information
- Father: Carl Armstrong
- Mother: Tricia Armstrong
- Half-brothers: Brad Armstrong

Jamie Armstrong, played by Joe Gilgun. He lived on Coronation Street for a period of three years between 1994 and 1997.

10-year-old Jamie was first seen when he was caught shoplifting from Bettabuys by assistant manager Curly Watts (Kevin Kennedy). His mother Tricia (Tracy Brabin) flirted with Curly in order to get Jamie out of trouble and they briefly began to date, until her violent ex-husband Carl turned up. Jamie was being looked after by Jack Duckworth (Bill Tarmey) whilst Tricia and Curly were on a date, when Carl arrived and attacked Jack. As Tricia and Jamie settled into the street – befriending not only the Duckworths, but Deirdre Barlow (Anne Kirkbride) and Roy Cropper (David Neilson) – Jamie developed interests in Jim McDonald's (Charles Lawson) motorbike and Jack's pigeons. After he turned eleven, Jamie moved from Bessie Street Juniors to Weatherfield Comprehensive. He started looking after Jack's pigeons to get some extra money but seemed genuinely interested in them, cooing and stroking them just like Jack.

Jamie had a reputation of being a troublemaker, and was often the first suspect whenever things went wrong – even if it was not his fault. When he saw someone stealing Josie Clarke's (Ellie Haddington) bike he tried to get it back for her, and he was spotted hanging round the back door by Percy Sugden (Bill Waddington), who thought he had stolen it when the bike was reported missing. Because of his reputation, it was difficult to make people believe him when he was telling the truth. Tricia always defended her son and told everyone to stop picking on him, but would often order him to tell the truth once they were alone.

However, Jamie did have a mischievous streak. He once implemented a bike puncture scam to get some extra money. People came out of their houses and realised they had a puncture. Jamie would be nearby and happened to have a repair kit and offered to fix the tyres and receive money in return. He also helped his mother to get revenge on Mike Baldwin (Johnny Briggs) for evicting them, by emptying a chamber pot over his head.

Jamie did not like being without his mother and was extremely close to her. When she was in prison for non-payment of her TV licence, he ran away from the foster home he had been staying at and went back to their flat. Deirdre saw him outside and took him in for the evening. Jamie was very good at assuming an innocent expression that appealed to people's maternal instincts. He was also very concerned when Tricia discovered she was pregnant with Terry Duckworth's (Nigel Pivaro) child and was trying to decide what to do. Jamie did not know what the problem was, but he wanted to help, and made Tricia breakfast in bed. They moved in with Jack and Vera and Jamie later helped along with Betty Williams (Betty Driver) to deliver his baby half-brother Brad in the back room of The Rovers.

Jamie finally left the street with Tricia and Brad, when Tricia decided to start a new life for them with decorator Ray Thorpe. She had realised that Terry would never be a suitable father to her children. Jamie was upset at having to leave the street, but Jack and Vera reassured him and they bid a bitter-sweet farewell.

== Norris Cole ==
Norris Cole, played by Malcolm Hebden, made his first appearance during the episode broadcast on 11 March 1994. Hebden had previously played the role of Carlos, Mavis Riley's (Thelma Barlow) Spanish lover, in 1974. Norris appeared on a recurring basis, until he was axed in April 1997 by Brian Park. However, two years later, the character was reintroduced on a regular basis. He has lived for several years with fellow character, Emily Bishop (Eileen Derbyshire) at 3 Coronation Street, first as a lodger, and more recently as the house owner. Hebden retired from acting in 2021 and the character was killed-off offscreen.

== Sister Radford ==
Sister Radford
- Coronation Street character
- Portrayed by: Nimmy March
- First appearance: 18 March 1994
- Last appearance: 21 March 1994
- Introduced by: Carolyn Reynolds
In-universe information
- Occupation: Nurse

Sister Radford, played by Nimmy March, was a nurse at Weatherfield General. She was training Martin Platt (Sean Wilson), and was present when his seven-year-old adoptive daughter Sarah-Louise (Lynsey King) was recovering from appendicitis in the children's ward.

In March 1994, Sarah-Lou's appendix ruptured and she had an emergency operation. Whilst she was recovering, both Martin and his then wife Gail (Helen Worth) were disgusted with the lack of attention the patients received. This caused a furious Martin to accuse Sister of focusing on her own priorities rather than help children who needed medical treatment. This upset Sister Radford very much, and she refused to forgive Martin after he apologized. She told Gail and Sarah-Lou's paternal grandmother Ivy Tilsley (Lynne Perrie) that Sarah-Lou was making an excellent recovery.

The next day, Sister Radford told Martin that he needs to respect her more in training and they both called a truce, making the excuse that work was stressing them both.

== Jon Welch ==
Jon Welch
- Coronation Street character
- Portrayed by: David Michaels
- Duration: 1994–1996
- First appearance: 29 July 1994
- Last appearance: 12 February 1996
- Introduced by: Sue Pritchard
In-universe information
- Occupation: Hair stylist

Jon Welch, portrayed by David Michaels, was a hair stylist with 12 years experience who rented a chair at Denise Osbourne's (Denise Black) salon and was successful with customers and colleague, Fiona Middleton (Angela Griffin). In December 1994, Denise offered Jon first refusal to purchase her salon, but he refused due to marriage complications.

In February 1995, Jon entered a hairdressing competition using Raquel Wolstenhulme (Sarah Lancashire) as a model. As a result, he was awarded second prize. Feeling encouraged, Fiona entered the men's category by styling Steve McDonald's (Simon Gregson) hair and received a special commendation for her achievement at her first competition. As time went by, Jon began to build a relationship with Denise, but nothing materialised. In February 1996, Jon left to reunite with his ex-wife, and Fiona purchased the salon off Denise.

== Sean Skinner ==
Sean Skinner
- Coronation Street character
- Portrayed by: Terence Hillyer
- Duration: 1994–1997
- First appearance: 1 August 1994
- Last appearance: 5 May 1997
- Introduced by: Sue Pritchard
In-universe information
- Occupation: Bookmaker

Sean Skinner, played by Terence Hillyer, was a bookmaker who bought the Rosamund Street Betting Shop in 1994 and employed Des Barnes (Phillip Middlemiss) as a manager.

Sean was very hands-on as a boss, particularly when it came to other staff members. He tried to make a play for Liz McDonald (Bev Callard) when he was chasing her son Steve McDonald (Simon Gregson) for gambling debts. He left Weatherfield in 1997 after his relationship with Samantha Failsworth (Tina Hobley) came to an end. He kept hold of the shop until 2001, when he sold it to Peter Barlow (Chris Gascoyne).

== Samir Rachid ==
Samir Rachid
- Coronation Street character
- Portrayed by: Al Nedjari
- Duration: 1994–1995
- First appearance: 24 August 1994
- Last appearance: 2 June 1995
- Introduced by: Sue Pritchard
In-universe information
- Occupation: Waiter
- Wife: Deirdre Barlow (1994–1995)
- Stepdaughters: Tracy Barlow (1994–1995)

Samir Rachid was played by Al Nedjari from 1994 to 1995. He was the Moroccan boyfriend, and eventually the husband, of Deirdre Barlow (Anne Kirkbride). He was originally credited as "Samir Raship". Reflecting on the role years later, Nedjari explained that the role was his first job that he had outside of drama school, and that he was not too "thrilled" about the role as he had grown up without a television and thus did not feel connected to Coronation Street. He added, "I was quite a worthy, idealistic actor who wanted to do really important theatre but I left drama school on Friday and by Sunday evening I was on the set".

Deirdre, then aged 39, fell in love with Samir, a 21-year-old Moroccan waiter she met while on holiday in August 1994. She brought Samir to Weatherfield, insisting that it was much more than a holiday romance. Everyone was shocked when Deirdre married Samir who was only three years older than Deirdre's daughter, Tracy (Dawn Acton) – who nearly did not go to the wedding, disgusted with her mother's choice. Deirdre and Samir then moved to Morocco but their plans were cut short in June 1995 when Tracy collapsed in a nightclub after taking ecstasy and needed a kidney transplant. They returned to Weatherfield and Deirdre and Tracy's adoptive father, Ken Barlow (William Roache), were both tested but neither was a match for Tracy. Samir was tested and was surprisingly a perfect match. On the way to the hospital, Samir was attacked by a gang of youths in the street and later found unconscious on a canal towpath. He had suffered a fractured skull and later died in hospital but his kidneys were still in good condition and Deirdre gave the go-ahead for the organ to be donated to Tracy and the transplant was a success. However, Deirdre resented her daughter, blaming her for Samir's death.

Olivia Devereux-Evans from OK! called Samir Deirdre's "toy boy" who had a "tragic" exit. She also reported how viewers "were taken aback by AI's transformation from his soap-star days" when they recognised the actor in 2023 from one of his new projects.

== Fred Elliott ==
Frederick Handel "Fred" Elliott, played by John Savident. He made his first appearance during the episode airing on 26 August 1994. Savident quit the role in 2006 and Fred departed on screen on 11 October 2006.

== Angela Hawthorne ==
Angela Hawthorne
- Coronation Street character
- Portrayed by: Diane Fletcher
- Duration: 1994–1995, 2005
- First appearance: 28 October 1994
- Last appearance: 16 September 2005
- Introduced by: Sue Pritchard (1994, 1995); Tony Wood (2005)
In-universe information
- Other names: Angela Wilton (first married name); Angela Catchpole (second married name); Angela Cole (third married name); Angela Priestly (fourth married name); Angela Trench (fifth married name)
- Father: J.W. Hawthorne
- Brothers: Donald Hawthorne
- Husband: Derek Wilton (1985–1988); Mervin Catchpole (1989–1994); Norris Cole (1995–1999); Ivor Priestley (2000–2003); George Trench (2004–2006)
- Sons: Neville Hawthorne

Angela Hawthorne (previously Wilton, Catchpole, Cole, Priestly and Trench), played by Diane Fletcher. She was first introduced as Derek Wilton's former wife.

In December 1995, Derek's rival Norris Cole was set to marry Angela and asked Derek to be his best man, although Derek drove Norris to the wrong church in revenge for Norris stealing one of Derek's garden gnomes, Arthur. In 1997, Angela did not attend Derek's funeral as she was too upset. When Norris moved into Coronation Street in 1999, he and Angela had divorced.

Angela's last appearance was in 2005 when she turned up in the Kabin and offered Norris a job as he was looking for work somewhere else away from the Kabin, although he later changed his mind and decided to remain where he was. On 5 August 2007, Angela died after suffering a heart attack, and the news was broken to Norris by her son Neville.

== Sophie Webster ==
Sophie Webster was played by Ashleigh Middleton from 1994 until 1997 and by Emma Woodward from 8 June 1997 until 25 April 2004. Brooke Vincent took over the role on 12 May 2004 and stayed until 2019.

== Clifford Duckworth ==
Clifford Duckworth
- Coronation Street character
- Portrayed by: Dave King
- Duration: 1994–1995
- First appearance: 12 December 1994
- Last appearance: 6 January 1995
- Introduced by: Sue Pritchard
In-universe information
- Father: Harry Duckworth
- Mother: Maggie Duckworth
- Brothers: Jack Duckworth
- Wife: Elsie Duckworth
- Nephews: Terry Duckworth

Clifford "Cliff" Duckworth, played by Dave King. Was the older brother of Jack Duckworth and the husband of Elsie.

Clifford – or Cliff, as he preferred to be known – was the suave older brother of Jack. Cliff came to Weatherfield in 1994 to reconnect with Jack, having not seen him for years. He told Jack that he had been diagnosed with a heart condition – with only a few months, a year at most, to live. Jack and Vera felt sorry for him, and took him in at 9 Coronation Street, making sure he felt welcome. However, Jack tired of him before his wife, and despite years of not seeing him, he found him an annoyance. He also put Jack's nose out of joint when Vera gave Jack cigarettes for Christmas while she gave Cliff a jumper. However, he made Cliff re-sign his will so Jack himself would inherit and agreed for him to take over exterior repair work at No. 9. Cliff re-painted some of the stone cladding a deeper shade of blue.

Cliff, ever the charmer, told the couple that he, too, married a woman named Vera. However, this was proved to be untrue when, in 1995, Cliff's wife Elsie turned up, stormed into the Duckworths' house, grabbed Cliff and marched him out again with minimal explanation. After introducing herself as Elsie, she dragged Cliff down a stepladder (he was taking down the Christmas decorations at the time) and the pair disappeared, with Cliff promising to keep in touch. Jack stuck up for Cliff when Elsie took him home, saying that if Cliff wanted to spend his last days with him and Vera, let it lie. Elsie scoffed, saying that she'd kill him when they got home and that Cliff had no illness of any description.

In June of that year, Jack was devastated to read in the papers that Cliff and Elsie had been killed in a car crash while on holiday. Vera, who had prayed for money the previous day, was guilt-ridden. Jack and Vera inherited £30,000 from Cliff and Elsie's holiday insurance.

== Cathy Power ==
Cathy Power
- Coronation Street character
- Portrayed by: Theresa Brindley
- Duration: 1994–1995
- First appearance: 25 December 1994
- Last appearance: 10 April 1995
- Introduced by: Sue Pritchard
In-universe information
- Occupation: Student nurse

Cathy Power was a 19-year-old student nurse at Weatherfield General Hospital, where Martin Platt (Sean Wilson) worked. She first appeared on Christmas Day 1994 where she was upset over the death of a patient. She was comforted by Martin, who was experiencing marriage troubles with his wife, Gail Platt (Helen Worth). The two of them ended up having sex, but Martin regretted it afterwards and both agreed never to mention the infidelity again. However, as part of his mayoral duties, Gail's stepfather, Alf Roberts (Bryan Mosley), was visiting the hospital and saw them kissing. He then told his wife, Audrey Roberts (Sue Nicholls), which prompted Martin to confess to Gail, which he did before someone else told her. Gail went to confront Cathy at the hospital; however, she insisted it was meaningless, leaving Gail devastated by Martin's betrayal.
