= Paul Clayton (Coronation Street) =

Fictional character in British soap opera

- Coronation Street character
- Tom Hudson as Paul Clayton (2008)
- Portrayed by: Lee Booth (2000–2001); Tom Hudson (2007–2008)
- Duration: 2000–2001, 2007–2008
- First appearance: Episode 4938; 29 November 2000
- Last appearance: Episode 6827; 25 May 2008
- Introduced by: Jane MacNaught (2000, 2001); Steve Frost (2007)
In-universe information
- Occupation: Chef
- Father: Terry Duckworth
- Mother: Andrea Clayton
- Half-brothers: Tommy Duckworth; Brad Armstrong
- Grandfathers: Jack Duckworth; Harry Clayton
- Grandmothers: Vera Duckworth; Connie Clayton
- Aunts: Sue Clayton
- Other relatives: Amy Burton

Paul Clayton is a fictional character from the British ITV soap opera Coronation Street. Portrayed by Lee Booth, the character first appeared on-screen during an episode that aired on 29 November 2000. When the character returned in 2007, Paul was played by Tom Hudson.

== Development ==
When the character's return was announced in 2007, it was revealed that the character would pick up where his on-screen father, Terry, left off. Tom Hudson stated that the character would develop into a "loveable rogue", though he would ultimately become much more of a rogue than lovable. Hudson also noted that the character would take an interest in various women of the Street.

Following the character's return, Hudson revealed that a role on the show was what he had always hoped for, having watched it with his mother as a child. Around the time it was announced that Liz Dawn, who played Paul's paternal grandmother, Vera Duckworth, was leaving the show, Hudson claimed he would miss the actress, while acknowledging that ill health had forced her to leave.

Prior to the character's departure in 2008, Hudson stated that he had enjoyed his role but had other plans. He also said that the character would definitely return in later years, further resembling his on-screen father, and noted that the exit storyline was exactly what he had hoped for.

== Storylines ==
The son of Terry Duckworth (Nigel Pivaro) and Andrea Clayton (Caroline O'Neill), Paul was born off-screen on 16 February 1986, following the Clayton family's departure. Paul was raised by his maternal grandmother while Andrea attended university. Paul's paternal grandmother, Vera (Liz Dawn), however, insisted on some involvement in her grandson's upbringing, so the family decided to leave.

In November 2000, Andrea returned to Weatherfield looking for Terry because Paul needed a kidney transplant. Although Terry initially agreed to be a donor, he fled; consequently, Vera donated her kidney instead, saving Paul's life. Paul returned in November 2001 for his paternal grandfather Jack's (Bill Tarmey) 65th birthday celebrations.

He wasn't seen again until 2007, when Molly Compton (Vicky Binns) contacted him regarding Vera's failing health. He moved into 9 Coronation Street to help Jack look after Vera. It was soon revealed that Paul had come to Weatherfield after being caught in bed with his former employer's wife. Upon his return, Paul began working at Leanne Battersby's (Jane Danson) restaurant, Valandro's, eventually buying a share by taking out a loan in Jack's name.

Following Paul's arrival at number 9, Tyrone Dobbs (Alan Halsall) became suspicious of him. Tyrone repeatedly tried to catch Paul taking Jack's money but was unsuccessful. However, in September, Tyrone blamed Paul after Jack and Vera realized money was missing. Paul had taken the funds to buy items for the restaurant without Jack's permission, but Jack suspected Tyrone after catching him checking his tin.

In October 2007, Paul's previous employer persuaded Leanne to reveal Paul's whereabouts. Although she told him to take his case to number 9, Tyrone allowed Paul to escape through the back of the house. The employer subsequently raided Valandro's. Following this, Paul revealed to Leanne that he had feelings for her. Around Christmas, Paul told Jack about the loan, which meant Jack and Vera had less money than they thought for their planned retirement to Blackpool. Not wanting to upset Vera, Jack told her he had miscalculated their savings.

Following Vera's death in 2008, Dan Mason (Matthew Crompton) told Jack that he had a winning betting slip worth £3000 but needed the slip to pay him. Tyrone had placed the bet for Jack and given the slip to Vera, who forgot to pass it on before she died. Paul found the slip after he, Jack, Tyrone and Molly searched for it for almost two weeks. Dan confronted Paul when he attempted to hand it himself. They agreed that Dan would get a share of the money, and Dan gave Paul £2000.

Unfortunately, Dan's father Harry (Jack Ellis), mentioned the slip to Jack but soon realized Jack knew nothing about it. Harry claimed he was mistaken and confronted his son, insisting that Dan pay Jack the full £3000. Dan subsequently demanded that Paul return the money, but Paul refused, leading Dan to order meals at Valandro's and refuse to pay. Paul avoided Dan until Dan kidnapped him. When Paul claimed he had nothing but the clothes on his back, Dan demanded the clothes; eventually, Jack offered to pay Dan.

In March 2008, Paul set fire to Valandro's for Leanne, hoping it would lead to a more romantic relationship. After discovering that Leanne had used him, he gave a statement to the police about their plan. Dan, who was dating Leanne, provided her with an alibi, leaving Paul to face two years in prison. When Jack learned that Paul was considering fleeing, he offered him £10,000 to stay and promised an additional £30,000 upon his release to help him start over. However, Paul left the country but left the money behind, making Jack proud.

== Reception ==
Following his return in 2007, viewers weren't sure whether the character had good or bad intentions, whilst the character was involved in the storyline which saw Paul invest in Jack's savings.
