= Leanne Battersby =

Fictional character from Coronation Street

- Coronation Street character
- Portrayed by: Jane Danson
- Duration: 1997–2000, 2004–present
- First appearance: 4 July 1997
- Introduced by: Brian Park (1997); Tony Wood (2004)
- Spin-off appearances: Coronation Street: Text Santa Special (2015)
In-universe information
- Other names: Leanne Tilsley; Leanne Barlow; Leanne Anika Battersby
- Occupation: Sales assistant; Lap dancer; Waitress; Escort; Business owner; Restaurant manager; Kebab shop assistant; Barmaid; Cleaner; Personal assistant; Drug dealer
- Father: Les Battersby
- Mother: Stella Price
- Stepfather: Karl Munro
- Stepmother: Janice Battersby; Cilla Battersby-Brown
- Sisters: Toyah Battersby (step)
- Half-brothers: Greg Kelly; Chesney Brown (adoptive)
- Half-sisters: Eva Price
- Husband: Nick Tilsley (1998–1999, 2013–2014); Peter Barlow (2010–2012)
- Sons: Oliver Battersby
- Adoptive sons: Simon Barlow
- Grandmothers: Gloria Price; Betty Battersby
- Aunts: Josie Battersby
- Nieces: Susie Price

Leanne Battersby (also Tilsley and Barlow) is a fictional character from the British ITV soap opera Coronation Street, played by Jane Danson. It was announced in February 1997 that a "family from hell" would be introduced to Coronation Street. This included Les (Bruce Jones) and Janice Battersby (Vicky Entwistle), Les' daughter Leanne and Janice's daughter Toyah Battersby (Georgia Taylor). Leanne made her first appearance on 4 July 1997. Danson left the series on 23 August 2000 and returned on 7 June 2004. Danson later took maternity leave in 2006 and returned in early 2007. Danson took another maternity break in 2009 and returned in the same year. On 27 September 2017, Danson took an extended break from the show and returned three months later on 15 December 2017.

Leanne's storylines include numerous affairs, prostitution, drug abuse, insurance fraud, discovering her biological mother is pub landlady Stella Price (Michelle Collins), a miscarriage, an abortion, and a custody battle for Peter Barlow's (Chris Gascoyne) son, Simon (Alex Bain). Leanne has had numerous relationships within the show. She married Nick Tilsley (Adam Rickitt/Ben Price) in 1998, but they temporally divorced for a while. She married Peter Barlow in the show's live 50th anniversary episode, but divorced him in 2012 in reaction to his affair with Carla Connor (Alison King) being exposed. After a volatile reconciliation, she and Nick married for the second time in January 2013, but they divorced the following year. After a one-night stand, Leanne becomes pregnant with Steve McDonald's (Simon Gregson) baby and gives birth to a son, Oliver Battersby, who dies in 2020 from mitochondrial disease. Leanne reunites with Nick again in 2016 and 2018.

== Creation ==
=== Casting ===
Leanne as she appeared in 1997.

In February 1997, Rolf Myller from The People reported that a "family from hell" would be introduced to Coronation Street. Customers at the Rovers Return were said to be "horrified when a gruff newcomer with a jailbird wife and two tearaway teenage sons" (later changed to two daughters) arrive in Weatherfield. A Coronation Street insider said that the new family were the "real neighbours from hell", explaining that it was "a taste of things to come" from new executive producer, Brian Park, who thought the family would increase ratings. The previous "new guns" in the show were the McDonald's, however, this was over a few years ago. The insider hinted that the new family would have a "big impact". The writers introduced Leanne's mother by releasing her from jail, which the insider thought would shock viewers. They added that fans would be pleasantly surprised by some of the new twists in plots.

Actress Jane Danson was cast in the role of Leanne. After the introduction of the family, Danson said that the family came in with a bang and said that they are very different to anyone else on the show. She did not believe she had got the part until she filmed a scene in the Rovers Return Inn. Danson said she has always been a big fan of Coronation Street. Her favourite characters are the Duckworths and the Malletts. Everyone has been really welcoming and keep asking how she is doing. After joining Coronation Street, Danson started to become drained, tired and put on weight after playing Leanne for just six months. Danson took a short break from the show after being diagnosed with polyendocrine metabolic ovarian syndrome (PMOS).

Danson stated in March 2008 that she would stay with Coronation Street for as long as producers wanted the character. She explained that she has managed to create a perfect timing for filming and spending time at home with her family. She told the Sunday Mirror that being an actor with children is the perfect job. Danson said she could never imagine getting bored with Leanne and said if it was up to her, she could quite easily imagine still being there in 20 or 30 years time. Talking about her character, Danson added: "She's a loose cannon and she's destined to end up in a really bad way. I wonder how long she can keep picking herself up and dusting herself down - she's probably had six of her nine lives by now!"

=== Characterisation ===
Leanne has been described as loud, cheeky and holds an "in your face" attitude. She is very cocky, does not care and does what she wants. She's just a lout coming in at three o'clock in the morning all the time. She disrupts the Street with her loud music and she's always smoking and getting on everybody's nerves." She continued: "She's like a second-hand Spice Girl, who can't afford to go the whole way. But she wouldn't think twice about nicking clothes if she had the chance." Danson also added that she has "always been a good girl" and would not dare shoplift like Leanne.

Danson told the Daily Mirror that she would never put her own family life at risk like Leanne has done. After Leanne has an affair with Nick Tilsey, and keeps it a secret from her fiancé Peter. Danson said that Leanne is feeling a bit trapped with Peter and believes things have got a bit predictable and boring. She said that she is different and a very family-orientated person and although she enjoys work, she likes being with her family. Danson added that she likes the idea of being a party girl like Leanne but the reality is quite different and that Leanne seems to like drama and danger in her life. She added that she loves the fact that her character and herself are opposites, because Leanne gives her a chance to do things that she wouldn't do in reality.

== Development ==
=== Relationships ===
==== Nick Tilsley ====
Danson said that she was "intrigued" by the decision to re-introduce Nick Tilsley played by a different actor, Ben Price. Leanne was married to Nick from 1998 until 1999. Leanne and Nick split in 1999 and Nick started dating Maria Connor (Samia Smith). Speaking about Nick's re-introduction, Danson said it's interesting when an old character is re-introduced because even though it's a different actor, the previous baggage remains. Danson said that Nick has been involved with both Leanne and Maria and said obviously his family are there too so there is potential scope for that character. Danson said she doesn't know whether they will make anything of Leanne and him or not because she seems quite settled where she is. Danson revealed that there's always a possibility of revisiting it but Leanne would just wind up Nick.

I suppose it's an open book at the moment. I'd quite like to see Maria and Nick get together. It'll be interesting because working with Adam was lovely. We were really close at the time. He's abroad now so I wonder whether they'll go for someone very similar looking or if they'll go completely in a new direction. I don't think it really matters. Viewers get used to new actors and they accept them. It'll be interesting to see which way they go.

— Danson explains the potential of Nick's return.

In an interview with Soaplife, the new actor of Nick, Ben Price said that even though Nick has told Leanne that he still loves her, Leanne wants to be with Peter. Price added that there is always a chance with Leanne and Nick to get back together. Price added that he is expecting a storyline to develop between Nick and Leanne and that "You'll see him bump into Leanne soon. I'm sure stuff will come out of that - there's a story there." Asked whether if he wants to see Leanne and Nick to get back together, Price said: "There'd have to be a big journey to get to that point, but yeah, I would. But who knows? I don't know how it's going to go! But I think that would be great. But I think it could also be great if there's someone else on the Street who could come into his life. It's nice to keep spicing things up, really."

==== Dan Mason ====
Leanne began a relationship with Dan Mason (Matthew Crompton) in 2008. It was later confirmed that Dan would be leaving the show after he tries to burn down Leanne's restaurant in an insurance scam.

==== Peter Barlow ====
Peter returns to Weatherfield with his son, Simon Barlow (Alex Bain), and Leanne helps Peter as he struggles with fatherhood. Gascoyne told Digital Spy that Peter has not thought about how his relationship with Leanne is progressing. Gascoyne explained that Peter is taking it "step by step", saying "Peter knows that Leanne gets on really well with Simon and I think Peter's nicely surprised by that. Leanne kind of has the upper hand on him and in a strange way, Leanne's a moral voice."

Leanne tells Peter's family that she is going to reconcile with him rather than accept a job offer from her friends in Leeds. However, a woman named Christina (Sarah-Jayne Steed) arrives and claims that she met Peter on her father's yacht recently and decided to visit him. Leanne discovers that Peter left rehab early and she decides to leave. This story arc was implemented to facilitate Danson's temporary departure from the show to take maternity leave. Digital Spy reported that Leanne becomes "fed up" with Peter taking her for granted and finds employment in a restaurant in Leeds.t Peter attempts to prevent Leanne from leaving by getting Simon to beg her to stay. Despite this, Leanne leaves for Leeds. Leanne's departure was broadcast on 9 March 2009.

In September 2009, it was revealed that Danson had recently returned to work with the show. Danson admitted that was "terrified" about returning, saying "I felt like I’d been in Babyworld for ages and I was panicking about whether I could learn my lines. There didn’t seem to be enough hours in the day with two kids, but you somehow find the time." Leanne made her full-time return on 11 September 2009 when Peter finds her in Leeds. Danson said that Leanne is getting on with her life and tells Peter that she has moved on from their relationship. However, Leanne "has a change of heart and comes back [to Weatherfield]". She tells Janice that she has split up with her boyfriend and Peter invites her for dinner. Peter admits to a "few meaningless flings" and Leanne spends the night with him. However, Leanne becomes suspicious about remark that Simon makes about Michelle Connor (Kym Marsh). Leanne tricks Michelle, who reveals her one-night stand with Peter. Leanne then refuses to reconcile with him. When Peter apologises to Leanne, she throws eggs at him and refuses to forgive him. Leanne and Peter later reconcile. Leanne and Peter's relationship hits rock bottom. Leanne proposes to Peter. In an interview with What's on TV, Danson said that Peter and Leanne make a good couple and expressed her desire for the couple to marry at some point. After Peter accepts Leanne's proposal, asked if Leanne wants to be a real mum to Simon, Danson said: "She'd like to. Her mum left when she was little and Janice came to her rescue. Leanne wants to be as good at being a mum and she is. All she's ever wanted is the family set-up she has with Peter and Simon."

In November 2010, Carla Connor (Alison King) falls for Peter. Asked what is attracting Carla to Peter, king replied: "In Peter she has found someone who understands what she is going through." After Peter becomes disabled, Gascoyne said that Peter will be unable to be a proper husband to Leanne. Leanne and Peter's wedding day is coming closer, and Leanne is still having an affair with Nick. Asked whether Leanne will stop the affair, Danson replied: "She does love Peter. She feels safe and secure with him. They've created this family unit with Simon – and Leanne has the home life she craves. But when she's with Nick she gets a taste of the fast life and she’s the Leanne of old." After Carla calls her wedding off to Frank Foster (Andrew Lancel), Leanne cannot understand why Peter is being so protective of Carla. When asked to sum up Peter and Leanne's twelve months of marriage, Gascoyne said: "It's been very rocky to say the least. There was the stuff with Nick, Peter was very ill and had to get back on his feet, and there was all the guilt of Ashley dying, so it started off badly and carried on badly. And Peter says he's forgiven Leanne for Nick, but in his heart, it still niggles him." Danson said: "It's not been the best, has it! They had the blessing, where Peter found out about Nick, and then her mother turned up and they argued over that, then she got pregnant and had about half an episode of happiness, and then she lost her baby. And in the middle of all this, Carla's been hovering in the wings..." It was announced in September 2010 that Peter's father, Ken, will catch Leanne in bed with Nick. An insider commented: "Leanne is wracked with guilt over the affair," a source told the paper. "She loves Peter, she loves his son Simon and they've been through a lot together - but Nick was her first love and she never got over that." It was later revealed that Peter will find out from his sister Tracy Barlow (Kate Ford) that Leanne is sleeping with Nick. Danson has said that Leanne's actions has changed her views on cheating.

=== Return ===
"Leanne decides to stir up as much trouble as she can. I've got a few explosive scenes with Adam and Samia... great shouting and screaming catfights in the Rovers and down the cobbles. I don't think she loves Nick any more. There's maybe a spark for all of 20 seconds but it soon passes and she remembers what he's like. Leanne's just meddling with his mind. It feels really nice to be part of the cast again, although it took a few weeks to get bedded in. Now it's like I've never been away."

— Jane Danson explains her return (2004)

On 5 February 2004, it was confirmed that Danson would be reprising the role of Leanne. It was revealed that Danson would be returning to the show full-time. Danson commented on her return: "They're having a ball in this really seedy bar, eyeing up the ladies. Les spots Leanne from behind and says, 'Wow look at that'. She turns round and he realises to his horror it's his daughter. Les shouts, 'What are you doing here?' But Leanne is wondering exactly the same about him. Of course, Patrick doesn't realise it's Les' daughter. He gropes Leanne's bum and she gives him a good wallop. It causes such a commotion they all get chucked out and Leanne is sacked. She also lived in a room above the bar and suddenly has nowhere to stay. So Les offers to take her home to No.5."

Upon hearing that Leanne would be returning as a hooker, Danson told the Daily Mirror: "Even for Leanne it's quite a radical storyline," she says. "But I've been pleasantly surprised. There hasn't been any adverse reaction." Danson said she found it hard to work on Coronation Street as her 10-month-old son Harry was asleep before she left and was in bed upon finishing filming. Danson commented: "As much as I love my job I miss Harry incredibly," she admits. "He's happy, he's with his dad and he's absolutely fine, but I feel I'm being pulled in two directions and not giving 100 percent to anybody. I feel completely torn. I need to work and to provide for Harry, but I also feel terribly guilty that I'm not there. I pine for him and feel this need to be with him constantly. With Leanne's current storyline I'm working long days. Harry wakes up at 7 am but I leave the house about 6.30 am and when I get home he's usually gone to bed. But I'm not on my own - a lot of the cast have got kids and they tell me it does get easier. I ache for him sometimes, but I think I would be forever kicking myself if I hadn't come back to work. I love being in Coronation Street. I've worked really hard to get this far and this is Harry's future too." When Danson was presented with her return scripts, she was shocked to see that she was returning as an escort girl. Danson added: "I'm not going to pretend that initially thought it was great. Coronation Street has never done a story like that before and I was worried people wouldn't like it. When I read the scripts I thought it just was a funny storyline - Leanne was charging people for her company while they took her out for a slap-up dinner. But when it turned out she carried on after dinner, I thought, 'Oh God!' "Thankfully it's not been seedy and I think she will redeem herself in the end." A Coronation Street insider added: "Soon after arriving back Leanne wonders what the hell she has come back to. There are some cracking storylines lined up for her."

=== Prostitution ===
In February 2007, it was reported that Leanne would become Coronation Street's first ever prostitute following Danson's on-screen return from maternity leave. The Daily Mirror reported that Leanne would reveal that she became a prostitute to make money while holidaying in Spain. A source told the newspaper: "It’s one of our racier storylines and we believe it will be a ratings winner, sparking much debate." Leanne cannot see anything wrong in being a prostitute because "if the money’s there she’s up for it". Danson was told about the storyline after returning from maternity leave and she initially disapproved. She said "Coronation Street has never done a story like that before and I was worried people wouldn't like it." However, upon reading the scripts, Danson thought it was "just a funny storyline".

Discussing her initial hesitation, Danson explained "Leanne was charging people for her company while they took her out for a slap-up dinner. But when it turned out she carried on after dinner, I thought, 'Oh God!'" The actress added that she was thankful that the storyline was not "seedy" and opined that Leanne would "redeem herself in the end". Leanne adopts an alter-ego of "Rachel" with a "posh voice" and "plies her trade to bored businessmen in top Manchester hotels" as a high class escort. To explain her income Leanne tells Les and Janice that she is selling property for an estate agent. The actress stated that humour was added to the storyline in "true [Coronation Street] fashion". Leanne uses a hotel to meet her clients, but the hotel manager discovers this and throws her out, humiliating her.

=== Stella Price ===
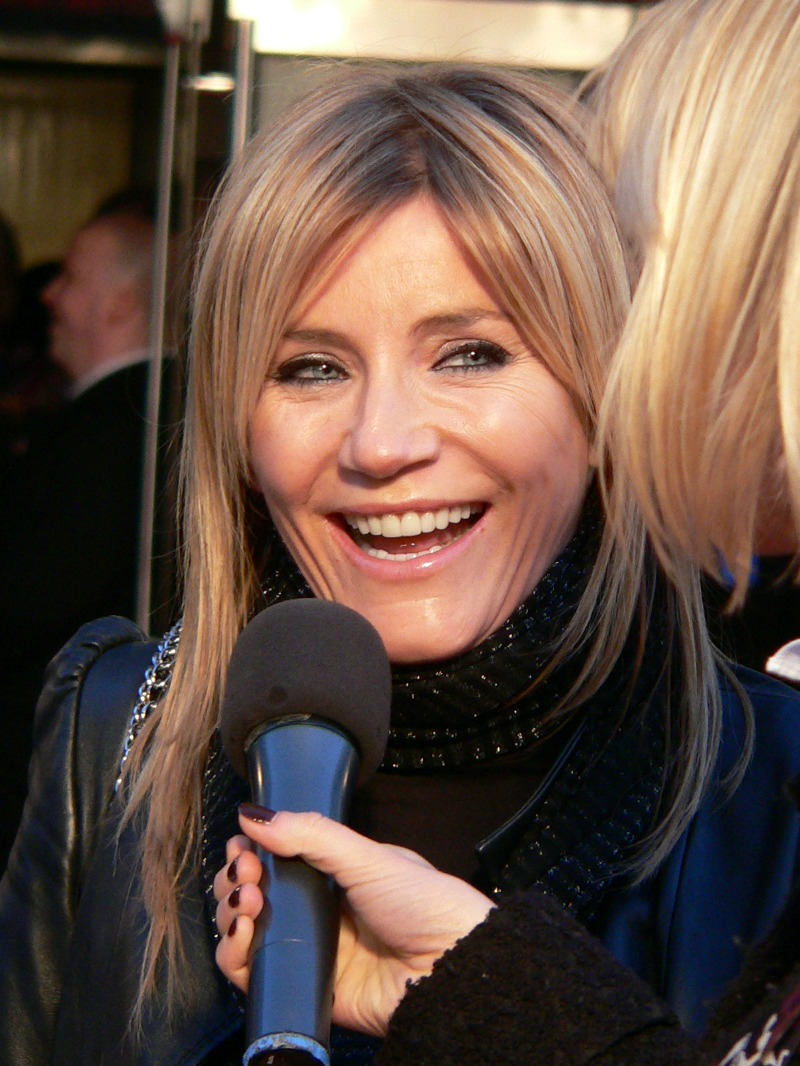
Michelle Collins was cast as Stella Price in 2011 and was later revealed to be Leanne's biological mother.

In May 2011, Danson teased an "exciting" upcoming storyline involving Leanne. Danson revealed that she was surprised by the storyline, saying "I thought now that [Leanne and Peter are] married they'll probably have a baby and do the expected thing. But I think I'm alright to say that it's not that. I would love to tell you [what it is]! Keep watching." It was later reported that new character, Stella Price (Michelle Collins), would be revealed to be Leanne's biological mother. The storyline was confirmed in June 2011. Collins told Soaplife magazine that Stella has moved to Weatherfield as she has decided that it is the time to finally make herself known to Leanne. Stella was in a relationship with Les Battersby (Bruce Jones) and gave birth to Leanne when she was seventeen. Les started drinking and left her alone with Leanne and she struggled to cope. Stella left with every intention of coming back for Leanne once she was settled. When she did, Les would not let her near Leanne and Collins said that Stella "didn't stand a chance".

Leanne discovers Stella's true identity as she celebrates her 30th birthday. Speaking to Inside Soap magazine about the storyline, Danson explained: "Leanne has never really given her birth mother a second thought because she's not been in her life. Her dad Les and step mum Janice [Battersby] (Vicky Entwistle) were together for a long time, so Janice always took on that mother role. Having said that, Leanne's always known Janice by her first name, so she hasn't called anyone 'Mummy'." Discussing having Collins as her on-screen mother, Danson said that she was looking forward to the "really meaty" scenes between Stella and Leanne. Danson added that people have said that she and Collins have similar face shapes and the same mannerisms. She thought it would be interesting to see if viewers pick up on the resemblance between herself and Collins.

Danson said that Leanne will be "furious" upon discovering that Stella is her mother. Speaking to Inside Soap about the plot, Danson commented: "Leanne has never really given her birth mother a second thought because she's not been in her life. Her dad Les and stepmum Janice were together for a long time, so Janice always took on that mother role. Having said that, Leanne's always known Janice by her first name, so she hasn't called anyone 'Mummy'." Asked how Leanne reacts to the discovery, Danson added: "You'll have to wait and see! She'll either be over the moon to have her real mother in her life, or she'll be absolutely furious that she's been absent all these years." Speaking to Soaplife, Catherine Tyldesley who plays Stella's daughter Eva Price explains Eva's motions when Stella starts to show a significant amount of interest in Leanne. Tyldesley commented that Eva is jealous that Leanne is married with a family because she split up from her fiancé just weeks before finding out Leanne is her half-sister. She also added that Stella is Eva's "territory".

She's angry. Eva doesn't want to share her mum. She's never had to share anything so why start now? But when she sees her mum upset because she thinks Leanne has ignored her birthday there’s definitely a bit of guilt there. Eva’s happy that somebody's finally in her corner because everything's been about Leanne and Stella. Eva's been forgotten and Karl can see that and he reminds Stella that she should be looking out for her other daughter, the one who's been around all along.

— Catherine Tyldesley explains Eva's emotions towards Leanne.

=== Domestic violence ===
In March 2015, it was announced that the character of Simon would be involved in a domestic abuse storyline, with it being where Simon is the perpetrator and his stepmother Leanne would be the victim. Executive producer Kieran Roberts said "It's a really interesting story. It's come from character, as Simon is a child who has obviously been through a very difficult few years with the death of his mother, his dad's alcoholism and then being passed around by the adults in his life. He's seen a lot of difficult things and he's got some more difficult things to go through this year in the next few months. I can't give much away, but there is at least one other major trauma that Simon is going to have to go through. I think it's fair to say that he's going to come through all of this a little bit damaged. We're going to explore how that impacts on his relationship with Leanne, and we’re going to touch on this issue of domestic violence from a child against a parent."

Danson said of the storyline that she had doubts when she heard about the domestic abuse plot. She admits she didn't buy the storyline when it was pitched as Leanne is "quite tough and she's always been a bit gobby" and wondered whether the character would "really take it from a teenager".

It's quite interesting. When they proposed this storyline, I was a bit concerned because I thought historically, as we've seen, Leanne's quite a strong character. I thought, 'She wouldn't take that from a child!' But the way it's been done is quite clever. He's a child who's been through so much with his dad, with the alcoholism, and he's lost so many people in his life. She's been the one constant, so she'll never give up on him. It's been really great to play out, because they've pretty much done it in real time. It's not just been two weeks of a storyline, they've played it out and we continue to play it out with what we're filming at the moment. It's been quite interesting to see a different side of Leanne as well.

— Danson speaking of the abuse plot and Simon's unsettled life.

=== Pregnancy ===
In June 2016, it was announced Leanne would fall pregnant following a one-night stand. Of the storyline, Danson said she was "really chuffed" for Leanne as Leanne "thinks this could be her last chance". Danson says her character wants to give Simon and the baby a life she never had and with Simon, Leanne "makes the point she won't love him any less". The father was revealed as Steve McDonald and Leanne and Michelle will also be "forced" to be friends after Michelle finds out she is pregnant and that "it's just really awkward". Danson also stated that Leanne wants to forget the McDonald's and raise the child with Nick. Liz also finds out, and Gail is "thrilled when she finds out" and that the situation, "It's like a little pressure cooker, it's all waiting to blow". Danson also says the storyline "provokes a lot of stories for a lot of other characters and it's how they will deal with the repercussions". Steve being the father will have implications on Leanne and Nick's relationship. Producer Kate Oates said, "Nick is persistent and Nick adores her" and the storyline will see if they can overcome Leanne being pregnant with another man's child.

== Storylines ==
=== 1997–2000 ===
Leanne moves to Coronation Street with her father Les Battersby (Bruce Jones), stepmother Janice and stepsister Toyah in July 1997. She starts dating Nick Tilsley (Adam Rickitt), despite his mother, Gail Platt's (Helen Worth) disapproval. Nick proposes and he and Leanne go to Scotland to get married. In an effort to become more responsible, Leanne quits her hairdressing course and starts work with Rita Sullivan (Barbara Knox) in the Kabin. Nick, however, continues at college and they move into No. 4 with Ashley Peacock (Steven Arnold), his girlfriend Zoe Tattersall (Joanne Froggatt) and Zoe's daughter, Shannon. Nick and Leanne's relationship becomes strained when Leanne gets pregnant. Insisting they are not ready for a baby, Nick persuades Leanne to have an abortion and tell people that she miscarried. Leanne reluctantly agrees and the relationship begins to deteriorate.

Nick learns that his father's killer, Darren Whateley (Andy Robb), will soon be released from prison. He persuades Leanne to befriend him, intending to send Darren back to prison. Things do not go according to plan and Leanne's safety is threatened when Darren breaks into her house. He returns to prison for breaking his parole conditions, despite the fact that Nick caused the situation. Their relationship breaks under the trauma and they split up. Now single, Leanne begins dating Vikram Desai (Chris Bisson). Excessive partying and late nights take their toll and Leanne resigns from The Kabin, following a row with Rita's foster daughter, Sharon Gaskell (Tracie Bennett), over missing money and starts work as barmaid at The Rovers Return Inn for Natalie Barnes (Denise Welch). Leanne starts taking drugs and ends up owing her drug dealer a lot of money, but refuses to rob the Rovers. Leanne ends up in hospital after a fight with one of Jez Quigley's (Lee Boardman) thugs. Leanne is scared and decides to leave Weatherfield.

=== 2004–present ===
In June 2004, Les finds Leanne working in a lap dancing bar while on a night out with Steve McDonald. She returns to Coronation Street and moves in with Janice, but soon causes trouble for her ex-husband, Nick, and his new girlfriend, Maria Sutherland (Samia Ghadie), after learning about Maria's affair with Toyah's ex-boyfriend John. Leanne and Maria's sparring culminates in a brawl in The Rovers Return and Nick leaves Weatherfield. Leanne dates Jamie Baldwin (Rupert Hill) and despite briefly dumping her for Maria, they reunite. However, in 2005, Leanne has an affair with Danny Baldwin (Bradley Walsh), Jamie's father. After the affair is exposed in January 2006, Jamie dumps Leanne and disowns his father. Danny moves in with Leanne and they get engaged, plotting to change Mike Baldwin's (Johnny Briggs) will, so Danny will inherit his father's fortune. Leanne eggs Danny on and he inherits everything upon Mike's death in April 2006. However, in July, Leanne finds another will that leaves everything to Adam Barlow (Sam Robertson). Leanne blackmails Danny with the new will for £100,000. Danny rejects her threats so Leanne gives the will to Adam and he has Danny arrested but drops the charges when Danny offers him a 40% share in Underworld. Danny evicts Leanne and she leaves Weatherfield.

Leanne returns eight months later, secretly working as an escort. Her stepmother, Janice, is disgusted. When Leanne starts dating Liam Connor (Rob James-Collier), Janice insists she choose between a loving relationship and her new career. Leanne is shocked to find her new client is Liam's brother, Paul (Sean Gallagher) and he threatens to tell Liam so she threatens to tell his wife, Carla Connor (Alison King). Following the incident with Paul, Leanne chooses to buy a restaurant with Carla, who pulls out after learning that Leanne is an escort and met Paul once. Refusing to believe that they did not sleep together, Carla leaves Leanne £10,000 in debt and dumps Paul. An angry Paul kidnaps Leanne, putting her in the boot of his car before accidentally crashing into a truck. Leanne suffers minor injuries but Paul is killed. Carla tells Liam about Leanne's escorting so he ends their relationship. Leanne borrows £10,000 she needs from Janice's plumber boyfriend Roger Stiles (Andrew Dunn), and pays him back throughout the year.

Leanne hires Paul Clayton (Tom Hudson) as a chef and he develops feelings for her, which she rejects. However, after realising that Valandro's is losing money, she and Paul burn the restaurant down for the insurance money in March 2008. Leanne sleeps with Paul to persuade him to torch the restaurant, which he does on 31 March 2008. Meanwhile, Leanne is dating Dan Mason (Matthew Crompton). When the police question her and Paul about the fire, Dan gives her an alibi. Paul, however, is arrested and released on bail, but goes on the run to avoid being imprisoned. In September, Dan needs £10,000 to buy the betting shop from his father, Harry (Jack Ellis), and Leanne offers him the money after Janice won £25,000 in a lottery scam. However, when Dan learned where the money came from, he breaks up with Leanne. Peter Barlow (Chris Gascoyne) returns to the Street with his five-year-old son, Simon (Alex Bain), and buys the betting shop. On 17 December 2008, a drunken Peter tries to kiss Leanne but she rejects him. However, she forgives him when he promises to give up alcohol and they start dating. In early 2009, Peter struggles to stay sober and starts a rehabilitation programme which Leanne supports, running the betting shop in his absence. Leanne thinks that he is having an affair and confronts him in the Rovers, but is mortified to learn that he was planning to propose. The reappearance of Leanne's ex-fiancé, Nick (now played by Ben Price), is another challenge to her relationship with Peter. After an explosion at the bar and a tram derailment, Nick, Peter, and Ashley are trapped in the office. Peter is seriously hurt and taken to hospital where he and Leanne marry but moments later, Peter goes into cardiac arrest brought on by a pericardial effusion and has to be resuscitated. To Leanne's relief, he survives and successfully comes through surgery to stop internal bleeding, but it is later revealed that he has damaged his spine and it could be some time before he can walk again. Noticing that Carla has romantic feelings for Peter, Leanne warns her to stay away from them and takes Peter on an impromptu honeymoon on New Year's Eve.

Upon their return, they move back to their flat but Peter is depressed about his injuries and hates being treated like an invalid. Leanne finds herself under great stress, having to look after both Simon and Peter and run the bookies with Nick, who continues to pressure her to leave Peter. Leanne later suspects that Peter and Carla had been having an affair but they were, in fact, supporting each other as alcoholics. Leanne and Peter argue and Peter refuses to forgive Leanne because she did not trust him. Leanne plans to leave Weatherfield for London but Peter stops her at the station. After a weekend spent talking through their problems, the couple agrees to give their marriage another try and head off, with Simon, on the honeymoon Peter had booked. The new landlady at The Rovers, Stella Price (Michelle Collins), is revealed to be Leanne's biological mother but Leanne rejects her. Leanne is overjoyed to find that she is pregnant but although Peter seems happy, he admits to Ken that he is not sure they are ready. Peter and Leanne celebrate in the Rovers and Carla overhears Deirdre and Ken congratulating them and forces Peter to confirm that Leanne is pregnant. Leanne is furious when she realises Carla knows about her pregnancy, especially when Carla drops hints to Simon about it. She confronts Peter and they argue about it, which ends with Leanne hurling vicious insults at Peter about his alcoholism and him storming out of the flat. Feeling guilty, Leanne runs after him but trips and falls down the stairs, where she is later found by Stella. Leanne miscarries and reconciles with Stella. Doctor Matt Carter (Oliver Mellor) tells her she is unlikely to get pregnant again without IVF treatment and while she is discussing this, Peter begins an affair with Carla. When Leanne learns of this, she leaves Weatherfield, despite Stella begging her to stay. She stays with her sister in Liverpool, but when she returns, Leanne decides to go for custody of Simon after she believes that Peter and Carla cannot take care of him. Simon ends up in hospital after drinking a bottle of wine, and Peter hands Simon over to Leanne.

Leanne later reconciles with Nick, and she and Simon move in with him after Peter and Carla leave Weatherfield. Leanne receives her decree absolute, but manipulation from Leanne's jealous half-sister, Eva, leads Nick to propose to Leanne, which she initially rejects but later accepts. Peter and Carla return from Los Angeles and Simon insists that he stay with his father, forcing them to cancel the wedding. Nick re-books the wedding but calls it off when Eva tells the congregation that Leanne visited Peter. Leanne attacks Peter and attempts to win Nick back, after realising he is the one she wants and re-books the wedding. Leanne sells her share of the bookies to Carla, for £90,000 and refuses to lower the price.

Nick falls into a coma, following a car accident with David. Leanne supports Nick when he is released from the hospital. He becomes argumentative and short-tempered, which Leanne finds difficult. Leanne discovers that Nick slept with David's wife, Kylie Platt (Paula Lane) on Christmas Day and that David caused the car crash. Following weeks of indecision, she allows Nick to look after Simon. He loses his temper and Leanne decides to reconcile with him and support his recovery. Despite Nick punching Leanne during an angry outburst on Christmas Day 2013, they stay together for another month, after which they split up, after Nick realised their marriage was based on nothing.

Leanne develops an attraction to Kal Nazir (Jimi Mistry). They initially attempt to distance themselves from one another fearing a relationship would ruin Nick's recovery from brain damage. When they start a relationship, Nick fires Leanne. She and Kal overcome problems in their relationship and she files for divorce from Nick. Nick behaves harshly towards Leanne and informs Kal's family about Leanne's prostitution past. Leanne begins work at the kebab shop and halts her divorce fearing the stress will take its toll on Nick's health. Nick admits that he faked the effects of his injury after Leanne confronts Nick and smashes items in his restaurant, during Kylie's birthday party, she then returns to working there in December 2014.

In May 2015, Kal is killed in a fire at the Victoria Court flats moments after proposing to her. Later that summer, Leanne recognises Liz McDonald's (Beverley Callard) new boyfriend, Dan Jones (Andrew Paul) as an old client from her days working as a prostitute. He threatens her, but she still tells Liz about his past. He then holds Leanne, Liz and Simon hostage in Leanne's flat and informs Simon about Leanne's prostitution. An angry Simon hits Leanne and continues to be abusive towards her, but promises to stop. On another occasion, he pushes her over knocking her unconscious and she is taken to hospital. Leanne then sends Simon to stay with Peter but his behaviour worsens when he returns from Plymouth and she confides in Eva about the abuse. Simon continues to hit Leanne, refuses to go to school, vandalises property and drunkenly causes a scene in the Bistro with his friends. Leanne forces Simon to live with his grandfather, Ken. When he tries to hit his cousin Amy, Leanne tells the truth about the domestic violence. They agree to help Simon with counselling, but when he deliberately injures a fellow football team player, Leanne reports him to the police. Simon initially refuses to forgive Leanne but after he visits Peter, they live together again.

Leanne sleeps with Steve in June 2016 and becomes pregnant with his baby. She fears it could be her final chance to be a mother and tells Steve she is keeping the unborn child. Steve chooses to have no role in his unborn child's life to protect his relationship with Michelle Connor (Kym Marsh). When a plan to go into business with Nick fails to happen, Leanne returns to work as the manager of the Bistro. After rejecting his attempts to rekindle their relationship, Leanne is hurt when Nick flirts with a customer. Leanne finds out that Liz knows about her pregnancy and Leanne is furious that Steve told her. Leanne makes it clear to Liz she is nothing to do with her baby and Leanne decides to move to Liverpool with Simon. At the coach station, Simon secretly phones Nick and Leanne admits that she loves him. Nick arrives, knowing about the baby and persuades Leanne to stay. Nick accompanies Leanne to her first scan. Leanne and Nick decide to move in together and for Nick to raise the baby as his, which doesn't impress Gail. Leanne admits to Nick that Steve is the father and he struggles to accept it. Nick decides to stay with Leanne. Leanne learns Steve may have inherited myotonic dystrophy from his father Jim and she and Nick want Steve to be tested for it, however; he refuses to do so. Leanne encourages Michelle to get Steve to take the test and also tells Tracy about it. Michelle is annoyed with Leanne's interference and reveals that he took the test. Leanne sees Peter at the hospital after Ken suffers a stroke. Leanne finds out she is expecting a boy.

Toyah returns on Christmas Day 2016, telling Leanne that she has left her husband Toby Chapman (Andrew Dowbiggin), as she has been having an affair. Toyah later meets with Leanne's ex-husband, Peter, with whom she is having the affair, and they agree to tell Leanne they are together. Toby visits Toyah to save their marriage, but Toyah refuses to listen or reconcile. Toyah then accompanies a pregnant Leanne to the hospital after she suffers a migraine. Toyah and Peter decide to keep their relationship a secret, but Simon witnesses them kissing whilst playing with his drone. Peter tells Toyah that Simon knows and they ask him to keep it a secret for Leanne's sake. Leanne figures out Peter is Toyah's boyfriend, after Tim Metcalfe (Joe Duttine) inadvertently reveals to Leanne about Peter's new girlfriend. Leanne is hurt that Eva knew and they involved Simon and she disowns both her sisters. Nick proposes to Leanne, and she accepts. Leanne forgives Eva, witnessed by Toyah and Toyah confronts her. Leanne and Toyah get stuck in the lift and Leanne goes into labour. Toyah helps deliver Leanne's baby and Leanne forgives her. Leanne and Nick name the baby Oliver. Leanne tells Nick she has decided not to put his on the birth certificate, but changes her mind. At a family party organised by Gail at The Bistro to celebrate Oliver's birth, Steve announces that Oliver is his son and Michelle punches Leanne.

In June 2017, Nick then leaves Weatherfield, leaving her devastated and Gail blames her. Leanne ends her friendship with Steve. After Nick's departure, Leanne stays in his Victoria Court flat until Nick decides to sell it. Due to Michelle intercepting the post informing Leanne of the new tenants, Leanne is forced to make a quick move with Simon and baby Oliver which prompts Peter to offer her space at the Rovers. At the same time, Toyah is emotionally suffering from her failed IVF attempts and having baby Oliver around after learning she would never have her own child proves too hard for Toyah. After Nick sends Leanne a cheque for £25,000 from the sale of the flat which Leanne tries to give to Toyah for IVF. After learning Toyah's news, Leanne offers to move out to make life easier for her sister. This causes her to move into Steve's flat after Tracy Barlow (Kate Ford), Peter's half-sister and enemy of Leanne, has a conversation with Steve in response to his concerns of a stable environment for Oliver. Moving into the flat with Steve brings the pair closer together as they try to co-parent, leading to Steve proposing to Leanne, which she initially rejects but after drinking with her sisters; she decided to return home and accept the proposal. Leanne wakes up the next day, unsure of the night before, and tries to find Steve to clear everything up. Amy overhears Leanne and Liz talking about the engagement and confronts Leanne and also sends a text, letting Simon know of the engagement. Leanne then leaves Oliver with Liz to look for Simon to clear the ordeal up and is met with Simon, Eva, Toyah, Amy and Peter on the cobbles, when Steve pulls up with Liz and Oliver in a babygrow that says "Marry my Daddy". After an awkward proposal, Leanne accepts and they celebrate in the Rovers. However, after a heart-to-heart discussion with Toyah, Leanne realises that she isn't in love with Steve and they both decide to end the engagement.

In September 2017, Leanne finds out that Michelle's ex-boyfriend Will Chatterton (Leon Ockenden) is stalking her and plans to take him down with Michelle. When they arrive at his house, Will grabs Leanne's ankle and she falls down the stairs hitting her head leaving Michelle in danger. Shortly after, Steve sneaks in the house and punches Will after he attempts to rape Michelle and calls Leanne an ambulance. Leanne leaves the street for a while but returns in December 2017.

In August 2018, she has a brief fling with Imran Habeeb (Charlie De Melo) unaware he is also seeing her sister, Toyah. When Sally informs them that he is dating them both, they very publicly pretend they want to be in a polygamous relationship with him and have a threesome. A few weeks before Steve's wedding to Tracy, Leanne has sex with him after they get drunk together. They both insist it was a drunken mistake and Steve goes on to marry Tracy, however just before Tracy marries Steve she threatens Leanne, which causes Leanne to think she knows about her sleeping with Steve. When Leanne tries to apologise to Tracy about the one-night stand, Tracy says she was talking about Oliver's outfit (as she wanted him to wear a kilt), meaning Leanne has accidentally revealed that she slept with Steve to Tracy. After Tracy punches Steve in front of the wedding guests, she insults Leanne and her past relationships, causing a fight between the two of them. On the way back from the wedding Leanne comes across Ryan Connor's (Ryan Prescott) bloodied body after he was hit by Ronan Truman's (Alan McKenna) car following a car chase between him, Michelle and Ali Neeson (James Burrows), Leanne gets out of her taxi but Ronan reverses his car in the process, knocking down Leanne. She is admitted to hospital, in need of heart surgery and when Toyah arrives Nick is by her bedside, having been called as her emergency contact. He wants to get back together with her, but she can't bring herself to forgive him.

In 2020, Oliver begins having seizures. After multiple trips to the hospital, it is revealed that he is suffering from Mitochondrial disease. Leanne fights to save his life despite doctors opinions, eventually going to court in order to prevent the hospital from turning off his life support machine. Eventually after much persuasion from Steve, Nick and others, she agrees to turn off the machine, with Oliver passing in November 2020. During this time, it is also revealed that Nick had a son with Natasha, which he did not know about, he eventually meets his son Sam Blakeman (Jude Riordan), which causes a rift between himself and Leanne.

Following Oliver’s death, Leanne falls into depression, asking Nick to move out of the flat, even going as far as to tell him she’s going away to France, but instead becoming a hermit in the flat. Simon confronts her, and agrees to help with the bills. He begins working as a delivery man at For Your Fries Only. Leanne begins calling psychic hotlines, in order to try and contact Oliver, pushing herself further into debt. Whilst at work, Simon is pressured by his colleague Jacob Hay (Jack James Ryan) into delivering drugs, he does various dodgy jobs including, threatening to set a guy, who had apparently stole from them, on fire. After this event is witnessed by Nick's newly discovered son Sam, Nick confronts Simon and eventually, Leanne discovers the truth. Over several weeks, Leanne pleads with Simon to stop dealing, Jacob ends up getting attacked after it is revealed that he was cutting the drugs, this leads Simon to replacing him and becoming further involved. Simon begins answering directly to Jacob’s former boss, Harvey (Will Mellor), who begins threatening Simon. In order to protect Simon, she offers to take his place, and she begins dealing herself, telling Simon that she was able to pay Harvey off. Simon discovers the truth after following Leanne during a drug deal, but she soon decides that enough is enough, and she goes to the police. Leanne gives a statement, but does not mention Simon’s involvement. The police begun watching her as she meets with Harvey and deals and eventually, they set up a sting operation, involving Simon. Harvey escapes the trap and when Leanne is in the flat packing her backs, Harvey bursts in and informs her that he knows Simon talked to the police. Leanne admits that it was her and he pulls her outside to his car. Before anything happens the police pull up and arrest Harvey. After Leanne makes a police statement against Harvey, she decides to go into hiding, out of fear, taking Simon and Nick with her. They inform family members that they should not be contacted.

On 21 April, Sharon Gaskell makes a surprise return. It soon becomes clear that she is Harvey's aunt, and that he is using her to find Leanne. She begins talking to Sam, in order to find out their location, through Nick. On 28 April, Sam manages to call Nick.

On 30 April, Peter is called into hospital to receive a donor liver, he tries to make contact with Simon by calling him, meanwhile Sharon informs Sam that Simon’s father is receiving a transplant, she convinces him to phone Nick to inform him of the news. Simon overhears Nick informing Leanne about Peter's surgery, and he runs off to see his dad. Whilst visiting Peter in the hospital, the doctor reveals the liver is unviable. A man is then seen informing someone over the phone of Simon’s location, and when the pair are leaving, Peter overhears the man mention Simon’s name and tells him to run, Peter is attacked, whilst Simon successfully escapes back to Leanne and Nicks secret flat, however he leaves the address with his dad. Peter is then told that the attack makes him appear unstable and therefore likely not a candidate for a transplant. When Peter is discharged from hospital, the same attacked man is waiting in the car park to follow them, however, Carla manages to slip away to visit Leanne and Simon, to inform him that his dad is okay. Sharon later manages to find the address on Carla's phone, but when she sends the attacker to the address, it is empty. Sharon continues to find ways to track them down, eventually leading to Nick’s son Sam getting kidnapped. Nick returns to the street upon hearing the news and when Sam is safe, Nick enters a taxi whose driver is revealed to be working for Harvey. He warns Nick that, if Simon and Leanne give evidence against Harvey, Sam would be harmed.

== Reception ==
A writer for the Sunday Mirror called Leanne "tough" while another writer called her "loud-mouthed" and a "mouthy Manc". A Coronation Street insider said: "Leanne packs a mean punch. It's no holds barred." Daniel Kilkelly from Digital Spy described Leanne as "love-torn". Danson won the award for the "Best Dramatic Performance" at the British Soap Awards 2011. Danson was additionally nominated for "Best Dramatic Performance" at the Inside Soap awards for marriage to Peter at his deathbed but lost out to Emmerdale's Danny Miller. She was also nominated for "Best Actress". In December 2010, following the show's critically acclaimed live episode, Jane Danson's performance was singled out by many Digital Spy forum members. The Guardian columnist Grace Dent commented on Danson's decision to return to the show in 2007 saying that viewers knew Leanne would come back. She described Leanne as "one of those rare thesps who knows which side her bread's buttered on". In 2010, Dan Martin from The Guardian put Peter on his "fantasy hit-list" of characters to be killed-off in 50th anniversary special in order to allow Leanne "to get her groove back".
