= Holly Newman =

English actress

Holly Newman (born 1974 in Lytham St Annes), is an English actress who played Lorraine Brownlow in Coronation Street. She has also appeared in Dalziel and Pascoe, Crossroads, Holby City, and Kiss Me Kate.
