= Al Nedjari =

British actor and director

- Born: 1972 or 1973 (age 52–53); London, England
- Occupations: Actor; theatre director; artistic director
- Years active: 1994–present

Al Nedjari (born 1972 or 1973) is a British actor and director who has worked almost exclusively on stage.

== Biography ==
Nedjari was born in England to an Algerian father and an English mother. After leaving drama school, he gained notability for the role of Samir Rachid on Coronation Street from August 1994 until June 1995.

Since leaving the soap, Nedjari has worked mainly in the theatre industry and founded a company called Gecko.
