= Terry Duckworth =

Fictional character from Coronation Street

- Coronation Street character
- Portrayed by: Nigel Pivaro
- Duration: 1983–1988, 1992–1993, 1996–1997, 1999–2002, 2008, 2012
- First appearance: Episode 2330; 1 August 1983
- Last appearance: Episode 7865; 11 May 2012
- Introduced by: Mervyn Watson (1983); Carolyn Reynolds (1992); Tony Wood (1993); Brian Park (1996); Jane Macnaught (1999); Steve Frost (2008); Phil Collinson (2012)
In-universe information
- Occupation: Businessman
- Father: Jack Duckworth
- Mother: Vera Duckworth
- Wife: Lisa Horton (1992)
- Sons: Paul Clayton; Tommy Duckworth; Brad Armstrong
- Grandfathers: Harry Duckworth; Joss Shackleton
- Grandmothers: Maggie Duckworth; Amy Burton
- Uncles: Clifford Duckworth

Terry Duckworth is a fictional character from the British ITV soap opera Coronation Street, played by Nigel Pivaro. He was introduced as the son of popular characters Jack (Bill Tarmey) and Vera Duckworth (Liz Dawn), making his on-screen debut on 1 August 1983. Terry has three sons: Paul Clayton, Tommy Duckworth, and Brad Armstrong. The character made regular appearances for four years until his departure in June 1987. He returned the following year for four months from August to December 1988. Since this, the character subsequently made recurring appearances from the 1990s until his final appearance in May 2012.

== Creation ==
=== Casting and introduction ===
Pivaro joined the cast as Terry in 1983. The actor originally auditioned for the role of Curly Watts and made it to the final stage of the process. Producers chose actor Kevin Kennedy over Pivaro, but Granada Television invited him to audition for the part of Terry, in which he was successful. He was introduced alongside Curly and Kevin Webster (Michael Le Vell) and together they formed a new generation of younger characters. Executive producer Bill Podmore told Jack Tinker in the book Coronation Street, that he was "extremely pleased" with the way that the "youngsters" had fitted in. He added that they created a "nicely balanced young comedy trio" which were bringing back "a bit of the bite" reminiscent of Ena Sharples (Violet Carson), Minnie Caldwell (Margot Bryant) and Martha Longhurst's (Lynne Carol) scenes.

=== Characterisation ===
Tinker described Terry arriving in the series as "a lad well-trained to look out for himself". In the 1997 Coronation Street Annual, Rob Sharp described Terry as a "good-looking" but "moody" character who spells trouble for every female he becomes involved with. Terry is a "homebreaker" who attempts to steal other men's partners. Terry is the serial's "opportunist" and always had a bad reputation. Sharp added that "Terry had spent a lifetime getting into various kinds of trouble, [but] it wasn't until after his wife Lisa's death that he began to show his true colours."

== Development ==
=== Relationship with Andrea Clayton ===
In one storyline Terry begins a relationship with Andrea Clayton (Caroline O'Neill). Sharp said that this was the first time that Terry "heads towards heartbreak". Andrea's parents do not approve of Terry and when she becomes pregnant they attempt to cut him out of Andrea's life. Terry "desperately" wanted the child, but the Claytons moved away and took away his chance to be a "real father".

=== Guest returns ===
In early-July 1999, Steven Murphy of Inside Soap reported Pivaro would be returning to Coronation Street as Terry following a Duckworth family crisis. A show spokesperson said "You can guarantee if Terry returns, trouble is bound to follow."

In October 2000, Inside Soap's Rachel Roberts and Allison Maund revealed that Terry would be returning again in November. A spokesperson for the serial told the writers that Terry would be nastier than ever. They added that "this time he surpasses even himself; Jack and Vera can't believe the despicable things he does."

On 2 February 2012, Daniel Kilkelly of Digital Spy reported Pivaro had agreed to reprise his role once again. The actor said "I am elated to be returning to Coronation Street, which as a Salfordian has been part of my life for nearly 50 years - not just as a character in the show, but as a fan long before becoming an actor." Pivaro added he was proud to carry Terry with him and when he was asked to return by producer Phil Collinson, he could not refuse the offer. Terry will return to Coronation Street unaware his son, Tommy (Chris Fountain), is now living there. Kilkelly said dramatic scenes would follow when Terry's reasons for returning are made clear. Collinson said "I'm very excited to be welcoming arch villain Terry Duckworth back to Coronation Street. I grew up watching him duck and dive and break his parents' hearts - a deliciously evil performance from Nigel Pivaro. This time, though, he'll not only be blighting the life of his son Tommy but the lives of every resident of Coronation Street with a typically audacious scheme." Terry returned on 16 April 2012 and remained for four weeks.

== Storylines ==
=== 1983–1988 ===
Terry arrives on the Street in 1983, having supposedly finished a stint in the Parachute Regiment. Initially, he was a cocky but well-meaning character. When Terry breaks into Alf Roberts' (Bryan Mosley) corner shop, whilst drunk, he confessed remorsefully to his crime.

In 1985, next-door neighbour Andrea Clayton becomes pregnant with Terry's child and had a son (Paul Duckworth); the Clayton family left the Street without Terry ever having any contact with the child. Terry leaves again in 1987, running off with a married woman, the wife of an old army friend, but returns briefly the following year, alone and strapped for cash. He pawns his watch to Alec Gilroy (Roy Barraclough) and argues with Don Brennan (Geoffrey Hinsliff) for refusing to pay a fare in his taxi.

=== 1992–1993 ===
Terry returns five years later with a pregnant girlfriend, Lisa Horton (Caroline Milmoe). Several months after his return, he is arrested for GBH and Lisa tells Jack (Bill Tarmey) and Vera (Liz Dawn) that Terry is in prison. He is released in order to marry Lisa, but uses the ceremony as an opportunity to escape briefly and is recaptured several days later. Terry has further three years added to his sentence. In September that year, Lisa gives birth to a son, whom she names Tommy (Darryl Edwards). The following year, Lisa is knocked down and killed by a car outside the Rovers Return after leaving Terry for Des Barnes (Philip Middlemiss). Jack and Vera attempt to care for Tommy but struggle with full custody.

Terry is paroled in December 1993, serving half his sentence for good behaviour and promptly surrenders custody of Tommy to Lisa's parents for £2,000 a year, stressing that Jack and Vera are unable to look after Tommy properly. Having effectively sold Tommy to the Hortons in Blackpool, he leaves after his father disowns him.

=== 1996–1997 ===
Terry returns again in June 1996 and has a one-night stand with Tricia Armstrong (Tracy Brabin), who falls pregnant. He brings Tommy to visit Jack and Vera after the Hortons do not pay him the money that they had agreed. Terry sees a chance for some easy cash when he learns his parents are the new owners of The Rovers Return and plays the model son, but his plans to make a quick buck were scuppered when the pub was absorbing most of its profits, leaving Jack and Vera with little spare. Terry obtains £10,000 in exchange for a contract giving the Hortons full custody of Tommy until he turns eighteen years old. Subsequently, Vera is devastated that Terry has sold his son again and orders his photograph to be thrown in the bin. Vera then writes him out of her will, leaving everything to Tommy while Jack completely disavows their son's existence.

Terry resurfaces in April 1997, much to his parents' anger. However, Tricia is elated, despite Terry being unable to remember her name. Tricia, after initially, thinking Terry was going to settle down with her and son Brad after his return, realises he was not a good father figure for Brad, and left the Street with her new boyfriend, Ray Thorpe (Chris Walker). Terry, meanwhile, tries cheating Jack and Vera again of their takings earned from the Rovers when Jack gives him some money in an envelope to deposit into the bank. Terry, intending to take the money and leave, discovers the envelope contains only plain pieces of paper. He returns the Rovers, enraged that there was no money in the envelope. Jack reveals he knew Terry would run off with the money and set a trap for him. Feeling disgraced, Terry leaves once again.

=== 1999–2002 ===
Terry reappears in August 1999 and buys his mother Vera a posh car. The car is revealed as being a death trap when it is involved in a car crash which indirectly resulted in the death of Judy Mallett the following month. On Christmas Day, Terry interrupts a Christmas dinner and is punched by Judy's husband Gary for causing Judy's death. Jack then tells his son how much misery he had brought down on Gary, and told him to never return to Coronation Street again. Alone with Terry, Vera finally stands up to her son, telling him he is evil and she slaps him. Terry resented Tyrone Dobbs (Alan Halsall) when he moved in and became a son to Jack and Vera. In November 2000, when his son Paul needed a kidney transplant, Terry returned and offered to be a donor for a price. But once he received the money he does a runner, leaving his mother Vera to donate instead. Reading a letter penned to him by Vera in case the worst should happen, she admitted to Jack a fling early in their marriage which cast doubt on Terry's paternity. Jack admits to Curly that he knew of the affair, but also had no doubt in his mind that Terry was his son as he reminded Jack too much of himself. The operation saves Paul's life, Vera nearly dies when she had an allergic reaction. Terry, in a rare show of heart, returns to the hospital to make sure his mother was okay before disappearing once again. Jack and Vera hear Terry once again when he is imprisoned again in October 2001. He claims, he has been framed for an attempted murder by a policeman who wanted revenge because Terry had been having an affair with his wife. This is revealed to be true, and Jack helps him, despite his better instincts. Terry is released from prison in January 2002 when he is proven innocent. He subsequently makes peace with Jack and Vera. Terry eventually sets up home with a girlfriend called Nadine in Sheffield, and had a job selling double glazing. He later moves to Wolverhampton and began selling mobile phones.

=== 2008–2012 ===
Terry returns to attend Vera's funeral. While Terry is ostensibly there for the funeral, he immediately causes discord when he fails to recognise Paul (now Tom Hudson), and it soon becomes clear that he is there to make sure that Jack does not want to move in with him. After persuading him not to sell to Tyrone and Molly Dobbs (Vicky Binns), and telling Paul he probably will not see him again until after Jack's death, he says goodbye to his father and leaves. However, when Jack dies in 2010, Terry makes an excuse that it is "too far" to attend the funeral much to the anger of Tyrone, who informed him of his father's death.

In April 2012, Terry returns to Coronation Street to open a lap-dancing club. Terry is unaware that Tommy now is living on the street and when he meets him he does not recognise him. Terry asks Tommy to move his van and when he refuses, Terry punches him. Tyrone then tells him who Tommy is. Terry states that he is not interested in getting to know his son and leaves. Local builder Owen Armstrong (Ian Puleston-Davies) demands a part-payment upfront putting Terry under pressure until he learns that Tommy has recently come into a large inheritance from his recently deceased maternal grandfather, Jeff (Dicken Ashworth). Terry claims that he wants to build a relationship with Tommy and sets about destroying his friendship with Tyrone. During a row with Tommy's girlfriend Tina McIntyre (Michelle Keegan), Terry pushes her to the ground and she suffers severe head injuries and falls into a coma. Terry tells Tommy that loan shark Rick Neelan (Greg Wood) attacked Tina as Terry owes Rick money. When Tina regains consciousness she tells Tommy it was Terry who attacked her. Tommy disowns Terry and Terry gets in his car and drives away, taking Tommy's money which he had stolen away with him.

== Reception ==
In an article published by the Daily Mirror which detailed the characters son Paul finding Jack's winning betting slip in 2008, it was said that even though Paul "never knew his dad, that rogue Terry Duckworth gene can't help rising to the surface."

An article published by Stuart Heritage of The Guardian during the time of Jack Duckworth's departure from the show described Terry as a "dour Elvis lookalike." Heritage explained that Terry "has spent his life knocking up women, getting thrown in prison and setting up bizarre human organ-harvesting scams". Based on the characters villainy, he claimed that "if Terry Duckworth ever teamed up with Nick Cotton, we would certainly be doomed".

Chris Fountain, who was cast as Terry's son Tommy, claimed in an interview with Digital Spy that "if Terry came back, I think it would cause fireworks between a lot of the characters. It would be nice to see how that would pan out, because obviously Tommy is completely different to Terry – he hasn't got so much of a temper and I don't think he's a nasty person. It would definitely be quite interesting to see what happened if Terry came back". Inside Soap's Sarah Ellis said that Terry had been "Weatherfield's Most Hated" for decades – and that there was good reason behind the status. A writer from The People: Soap Special named Terry as one of the "top 10 villains" of soap opera.

== See also ==
- List of soap opera villains
