= Tom Hudson (English actor) =

English actor born in 1986

- Born: Thomas Hudson; 2 October 1986 (age 39); Salford, England
- Spouse: Victoria Milne-Taylor (engaged January 2008)

Thomas "Tom" Hudson (born 2 October 1986 in Salford) is an English actor.

Hudson played the roles of Baz Wainwright in Grange Hill between 2003 and 2007 and of Paul Clayton, son of Terry Duckworth, in Coronation Street between 2007 and 2008. Hudson left Coronation Street in May 2008.

Other roles have included a part in the film Love + Hate and a small part as Jamie Coldwell in television series Casualty. He also had parts in Knight School, Heartbeat and The Royal.

In January 2008, Hudson announced his engagement to marry his girlfriend of two years, Victoria.

In 2019 he was named Managing Director of Marvin's Magic.
