= Nigel Pivaro =

British actor and journalist

- Born: 11 December 1959 (age 66); Manchester, Lancashire, England
- Occupations: Journalist, actor
- Children: 2
- Website: nigelpivaro.com

Nigel Pivaro (born 11 December 1959) is a British actor and journalist. He is best known for playing Terry Duckworth, the son of Jack and Vera Duckworth, in Coronation Street.

== Career ==
Pivaro was born in Manchester, England and has Italian ancestry. After studying acting at the Royal Academy of Dramatic Art, Pivaro made his acting debut in Short of Mutiny at the Theatre Royal Stratford East, Stratford, London in February 1983.

In August 1983, Pivaro was cast in the British soap opera Coronation Street as Terry Duckworth, the wayward son of the characters Jack and Vera. Pivaro appeared as a regular character for four years until his departure in June 1987. He returned the following year appearing from August to December 1988. He continued making appearances on the show on a recurring basis from 1992 to 2002. After a six-year hiatus, he returned for two episodes in January 2008 when his character attended the funeral of his mother Vera.

He made his most recent and final appearance to date in 2012 to participate in a major storyline involving his estranged son Tommy and his girlfriend Tina McIntyre in which Terry left her to die in a burning railway arch. These episodes were broadcast from April to May 2012.

Apart from Coronation Street Pivaro made guest appearances in the television series Hetty Wainthropp Investigates as Sergeant Pearce and Expert Witness as killer Colin Wardle. He also appeared in The Sunny Side of the Street for Channel Four.

Pivaro has acted in many theatre productions, including Wuthering Heights, What the Butler Saw, A Taste of Honey, The Tempest, Greek, An Evening with Gary Lineker co-starring Paul Ritter, Funny Peculiar, A View from the Bridge and Up and Under, including a 2003 appearance with John Altman in the John Godber play Bouncers. (Altman played Nick Cotton in EastEnders.) In 1987, he won the Edinburgh Festival Fringe 1st in the play No Further Cause for Concern.

In 2006, after completing a NTCJ Post Graduate course, Pivaro became a journalist, working for the Manchester Evening News and then the Tameside Reporter in Stalybridge. He is now a freelance journalist, and has been published regularly in the Daily Star, Daily Mirror and Sunday Mirror and Catholic Herald newspapers. Also published in the Daily Express, Die Zeit Online and Janes Intelligence Review. He has also written and presented documentary films for the BBC Inside Out series, including "Regeneration Game"(2007) which challenged the Government backed Housing Market Renewal programme and criticised its treatment of residents who were forced out of their neighbourhoods to make way for more affluent people. This was short listed for a Royal Television Society award in the best Current Affairs programme category. In 2009, Pivaro wrote and presented "The Battle for St. Michael's" for BBC's Inside Out. In January 2010 Pivaro appeared alongside Salford Star editor Stephen Kingston on BBC Newsnight in a film about the effects of regeneration in Salford. Pivaro is a regular contributor to the Salford Star magazine and in 2018 he helped raise £3,000 from the auction of a housebrick to keep the publication alive.

In 2008 along with Salford Star editor and founder Stephen Kingston, Pivaro received the "How Do" award for best investigative journalism. In 2009 the pair received an award "for clear and accessible language in journalism", from the Plain English Campaign.

In 2010, Pivaro presented a lecture at the University of Wolverhampton on his experiences while reporting on regeneration and participated in a special Radio 4 Today programme with Evan Davis where he criticised the Media City development at Salford Quays. Returning to acting in 2019, Pivaro has performed in several plays for BBC Radio Four including Eastern Star as a BBC Editor and several episodes of G F Newman's The Corrupted as Sir Michael O Dell, Detective Albright and Executive Officer Avedlund. 2022 TO 2023 Pivaro completed a 10-month nationwide tour of The Commitments by Roddy Doyle playing th role of Jimmy's Da.

== Personal life ==
Following nearly twenty years as a jobbing actor, Pivaro returned to his first love of history and politics, entering Salford University as a mature student in 1999. He graduated in 2003 with a 2:1 Honours degree in Contemporary Military and International History. In 2006, he graduated from the University of Wales in Aberystwyth with an MSc in Social Science and Economics.

In November 2012, Pivaro read a eulogy at former co-star Bill Tarmey's funeral. Pivaro is an obsessional map enthusiast and frequently refuses to use satellite navigation systems despite driving thousands of miles to assignment destinations. He is also a champion of the canal system.

He has two daughters.

== Filmography ==
- 24 Hour Party People (2002) .... Actor at Granada
- Expert Witness (1996) .... Colin Wardle
- The Sunny Side of the Street (1997)
- Hetty Wainthrop Investigates (1996) .... Sergeant Pearce
- Coronation Street (1983–1988, 1992–1993, 1996–1997, 1999–2002, 2008, 2012) .... Terry Duckworth
