= British Soap Award for Best Comedy Performance =

Annual British TV award

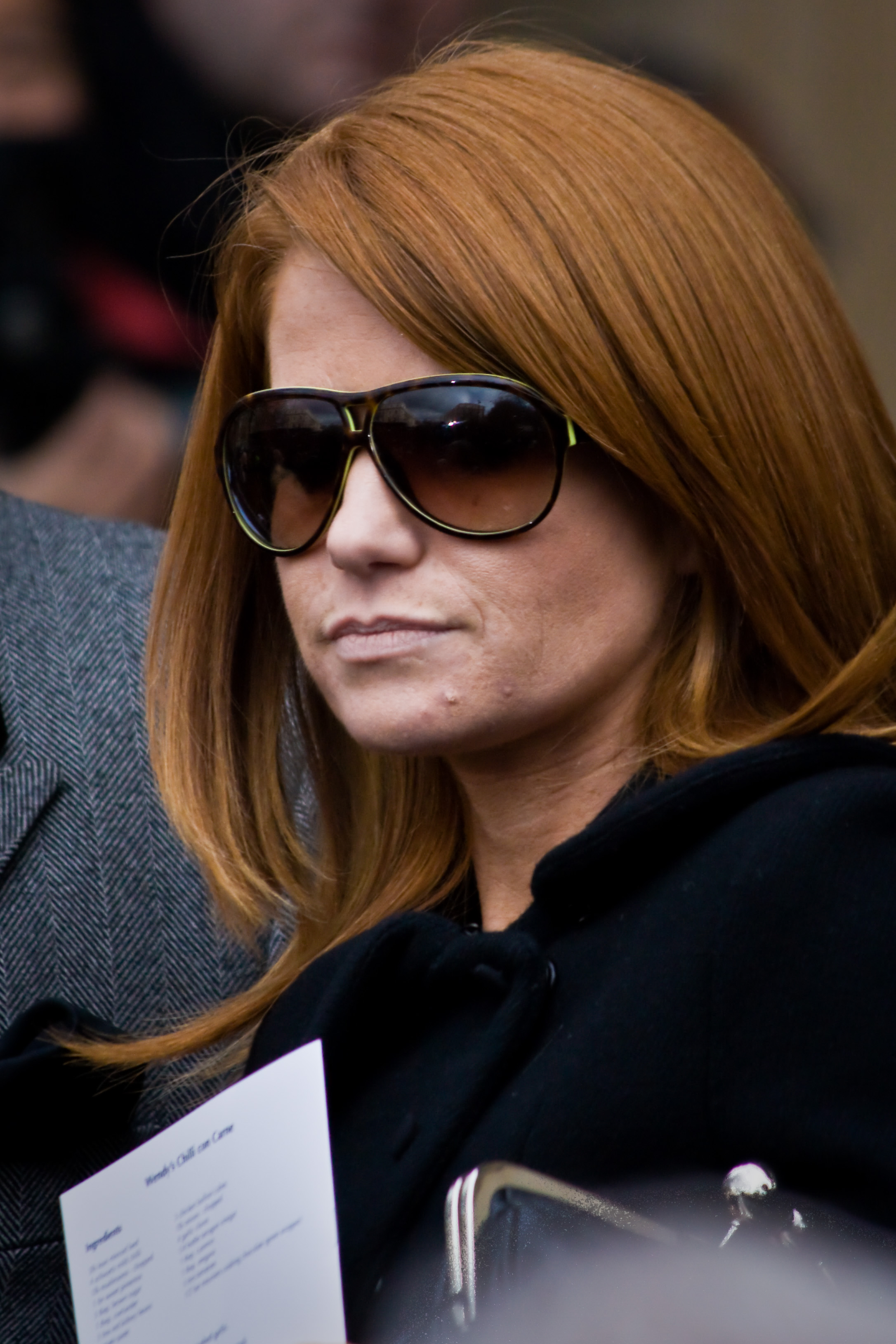
- The 2025 recipient: Patsy Palmer
- Country: United Kingdom
- First award: 1999
- Final award: 2025

Highlights
- Most awards: Patti Clare (3)

The British Soap Award for Best Comedy Performance was an award presented annually by the British Soap Awards. The award was formerly voted for by a panel, however, in 2025, it was a publicly-voted category. Coronation Street is the most awarded soap in the category, with fifteen wins. As well as this, Coronation Street actress Patti Clare holds the title for the most wins in the category, having received the Best Comedy Performance accolade three times. The final actor to win the accolade was EastEnders actress Patsy Palmer, for her role as Bianca Jackson in the soap.

== Winners and nominees ==
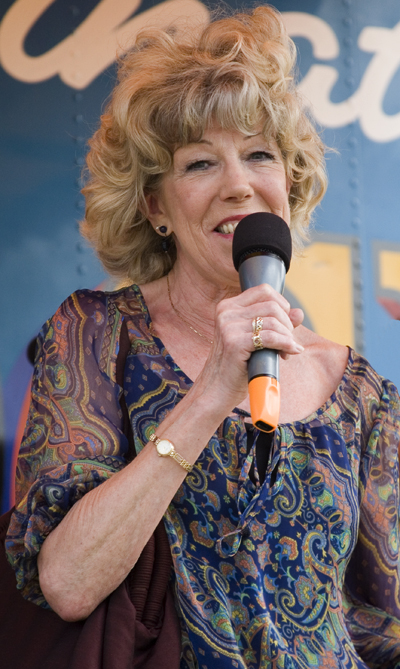
2000 winner Sue Nicholls.

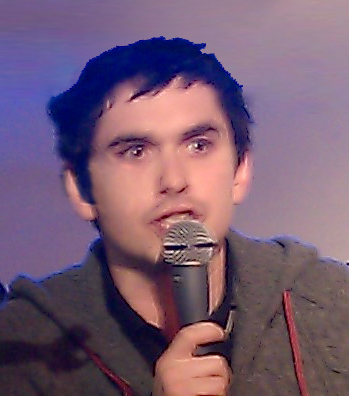
Alex Carter won in 2004 and was nominated again in 2011.

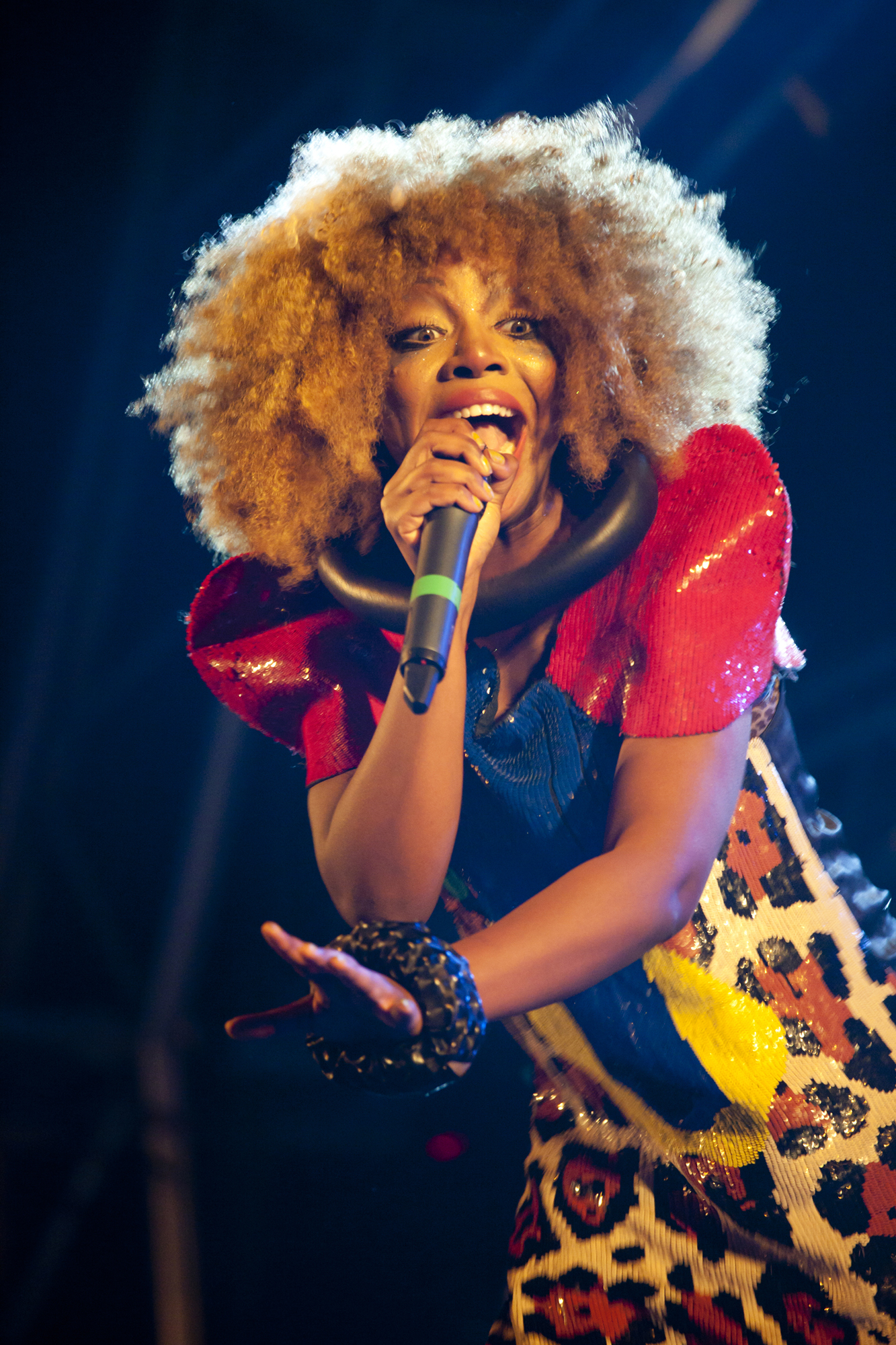
Ebony Bones was nominated in 2004 and 2005.

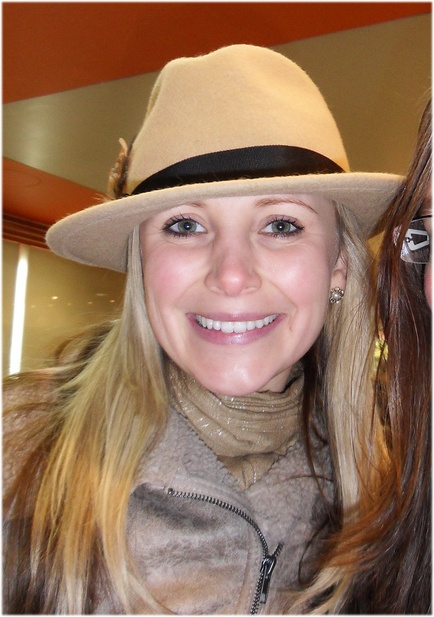
2005 and 2006 nominee Carley Stenson.

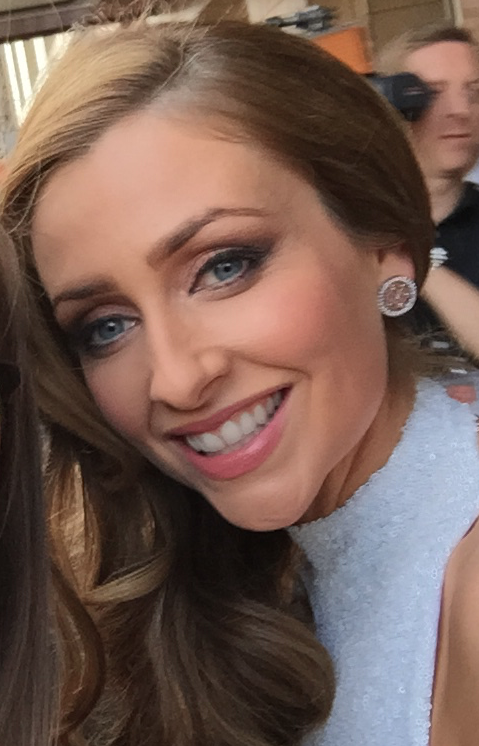
2007 winner Gemma Merna.

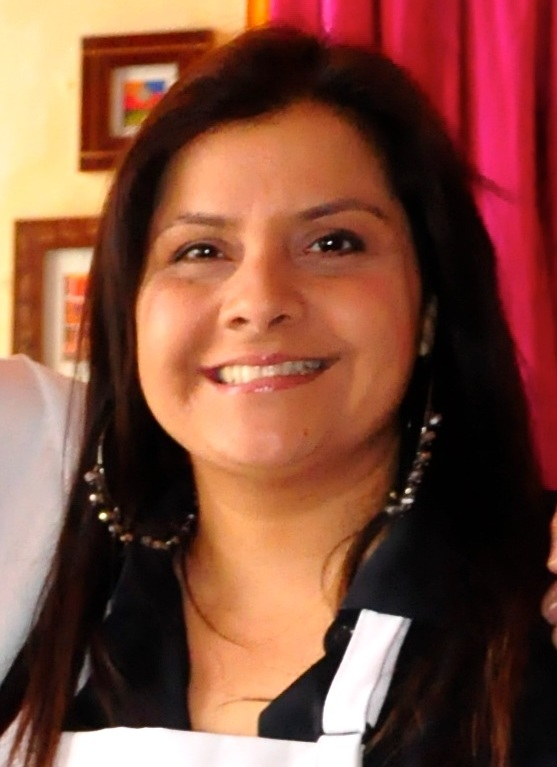
2009 winner and 2010 nominee Nina Wadia.

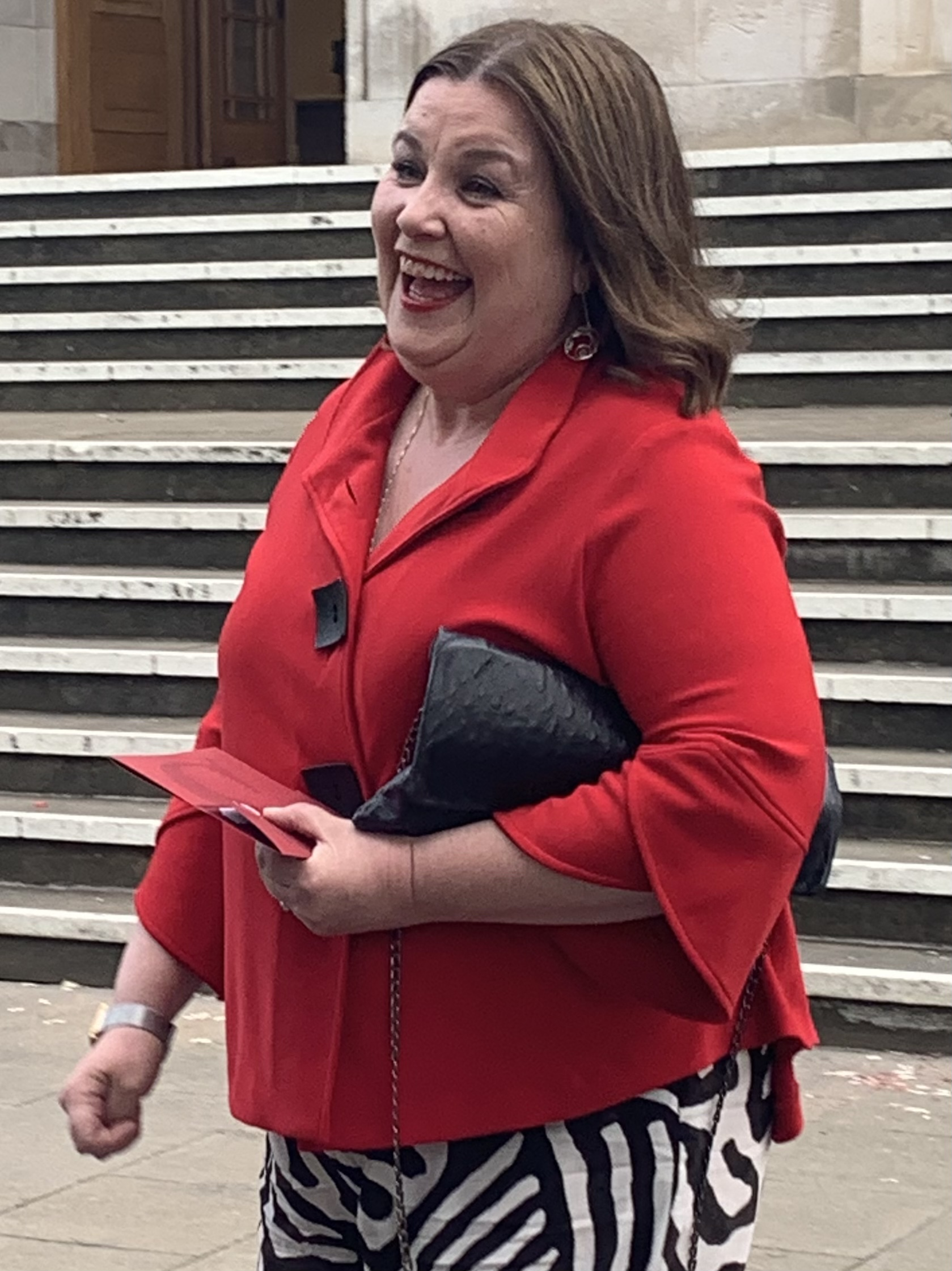
Patti Clare has won the award three times; 2011, 2013 and 2016.

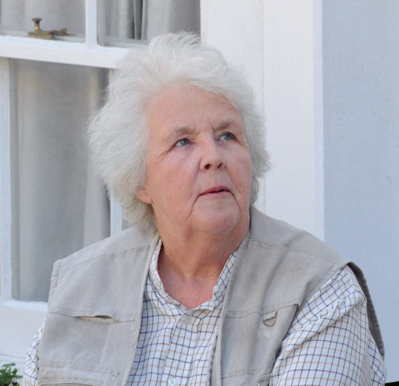
2012 winner Stephanie Cole.

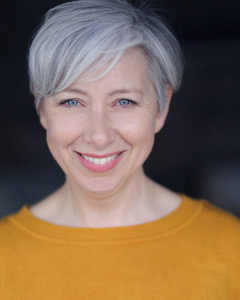
2019 winner Sarah Moyle was also nominated a further four times.

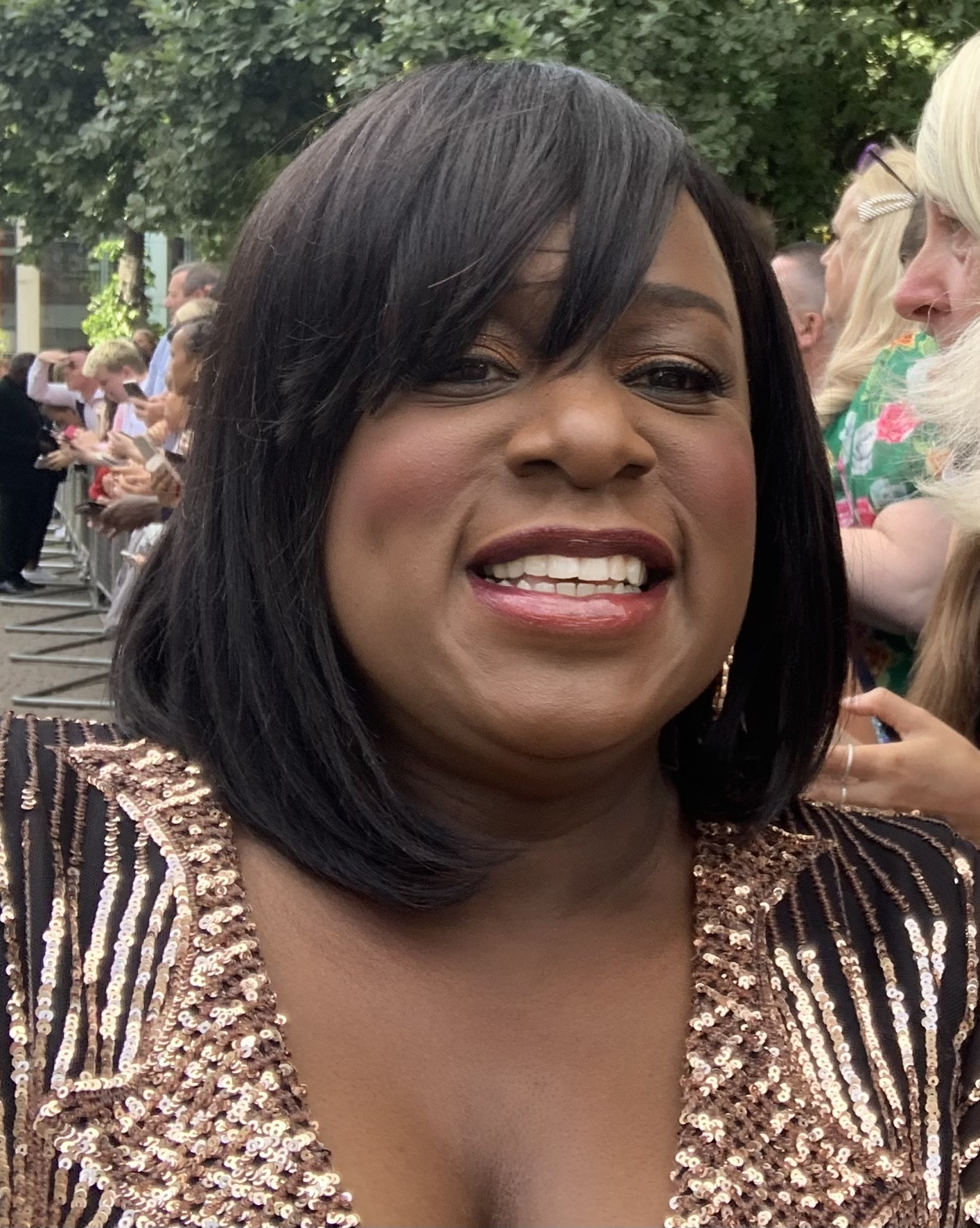
After being nominated six times, Tameka Empson won in 2022.

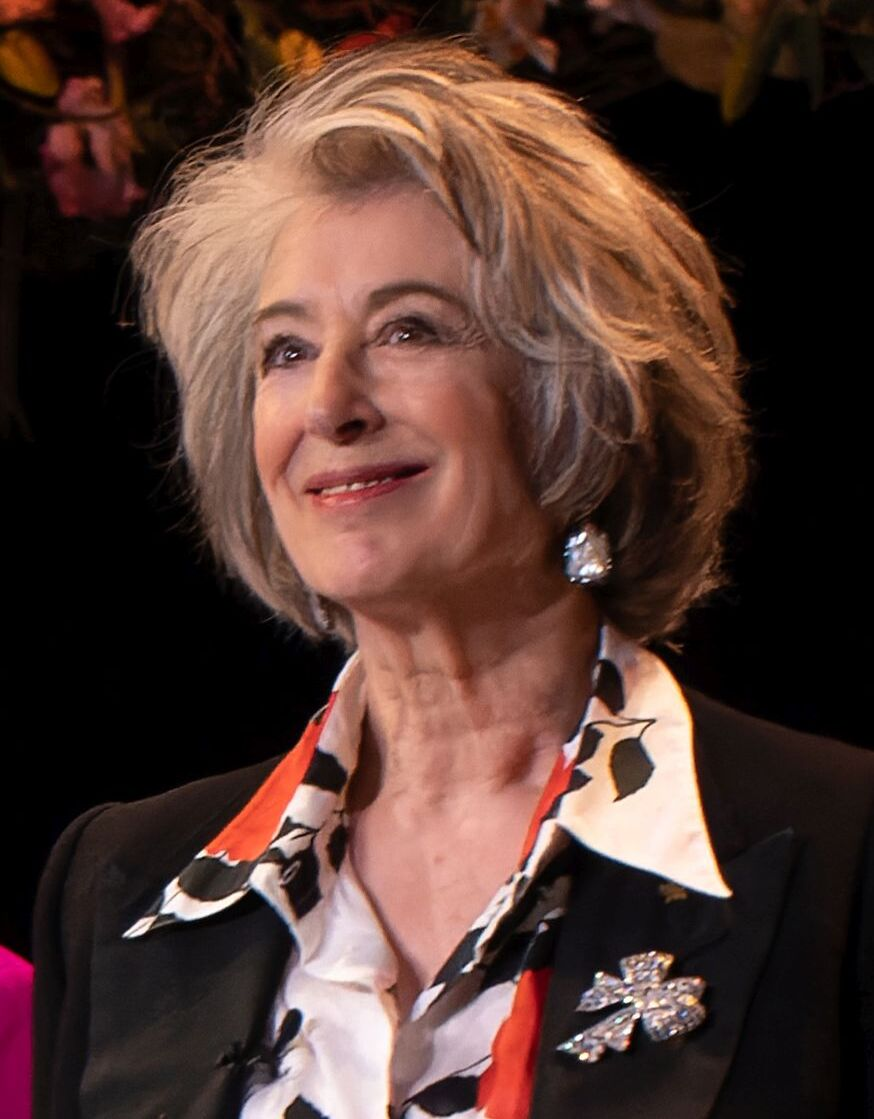
Maureen Lipman won the award in 2023.

Year	Actor	Role	Soap opera
1999	John Savident	Fred Elliott	Coronation Street
1999	Gladys Ambrose	Julia Brogan	Brookside
1999	David Neilson	Roy Cropper	Coronation Street
1999	June Brown	Dot Cotton	EastEnders
2000	Sue Nicholls	Audrey Roberts	Coronation Street
2000	Shaun Williamson	Barry Evans	EastEnders
2001	Sarah White	Bev McLoughlin	Brookside
2001	Shaun Williamson	Barry Evans	EastEnders
2001	Nick Pickard	Tony Hutchinson	Hollyoaks
2002	Malcolm Hebden	Norris Cole	Coronation Street
2002	John Bardon	Jim Branning	EastEnders
2002	Nick Pickard	Tony Hutchinson	Hollyoaks
2002	Lesley Joseph	Rachel Culgrin	Night and Day
2003	Andy Whyment	Kirk Sutherland	Coronation Street
2003	Shane Richie	Alfie Moon	EastEnders
2003	Mark Charnock	Marlon Dingle	Emmerdale
2004	Alex Carter	Lee Hunter	Hollyoaks
2004	Tony Audenshaw	Bob Hope	Emmerdale
2004	Shane Richie	Alfie Moon	EastEnders
2004	Ebony Thomas	Yasmin MacKenzie	Family Affairs
2005	Maggie Jones	Blanche Hunt	Coronation Street
2005	Deena Payne	Viv Hope	Emmerdale
2005	Carley Stenson	Steph Dean	Hollyoaks
2005	Ebony Thomas	Yasmin Green	Family Affairs
2006	Charlie Hardwick	Val Lambert	Emmerdale
2006	Malcolm Hebden	Norris Cole	Coronation Street
2006	Ricky Groves	Garry Hobbs	EastEnders
2006	Carley Stenson	Steph Dean	Hollyoaks
2007	Gemma Merna	Carmel McQueen	Hollyoaks
2007	Martha Howe-Douglas	Donna Parmar	Doctors
2007	Ricky Groves	Garry Hobbs	EastEnders
2007	Charlie Hardwick	Val Lambert	Emmerdale
2008	Maggie Jones	Blanche Hunt	Coronation Street
2008	Katherine Kelly	Becky Granger	Coronation Street
2008	Cheryl Fergison	Heather Trott	EastEnders
2008	Charlie Hardwick	Val Lambert	Emmerdale
2009	Nina Wadia	Zainab Masood	EastEnders
2009	Simon Gregson	Steve McDonald	Coronation Street
2009	Dominic Brunt	Paddy Kirk	Emmerdale
2009	Hollie-Jay Bowes	Michaela McQueen	Hollyoaks
2010	Craig Gazey	Graeme Proctor	Coronation Street
2010	Nina Wadia	Zainab Masood	EastEnders
2010	Dominic Brunt	Paddy Kirk	Emmerdale
2010	Bronagh Waugh	Cheryl Brady	Hollyoaks
2011	Patti Clare	Mary Taylor	Coronation Street
2011	Tameka Empson	Kim Fox	EastEnders
2011	Charlie Hardwick	Val Pollard	Emmerdale
2011	Alex Carter	Lee Hunter	Hollyoaks
2012	Stephanie Cole	Sylvia Goodwin	Coronation Street
2012	Jan Pearson	Karen Hollins	Doctors
2012	Tameka Empson	Kim Fox	EastEnders
2012	Joe Tracini	Dennis Savage	Hollyoaks
2013	Patti Clare	Mary Taylor	Coronation Street
2013	Ian Kelsey	Howard Bellamy	Doctors
2013	Ricky Norwood	Arthur "Fatboy" Chubb	EastEnders
2013	Dominic Brunt	Paddy Kirk	Emmerdale
2013	Nicole Barber-Lane	Myra McQueen	Hollyoaks
2014	Simon Gregson	Steve McDonald	Coronation Street
2014	Sarah Moyle	Valerie Pitman	Doctors
2014	Linda Henry	Shirley Carter	EastEnders
2014	Laura Norton	Kerry Wyatt	Emmerdale
2014	Dan Tetsell	Jim McGinn	Hollyoaks
2015	Sally Dynevor	Sally Webster	Coronation Street
2015	Sarah Moyle	Valerie Pitman	Doctors
2015	Tameka Empson	Kim Fox-Hubbard	EastEnders
2015	Laura Norton	Kerry Wyatt	Emmerdale
2015	Fabrizio Santino	Ziggy Roscoe	Hollyoaks
2016	Patti Clare	Mary Taylor	Coronation Street
2016	Sarah Moyle	Valerie Pitman	Doctors
2016	Tameka Empson	Kim Fox-Hubbard	EastEnders
2016	Matthew Wolfenden	David Metcalfe	Emmerdale
2016	Ross Adams	Scott Drinkwell	Hollyoaks
2017	Dolly-Rose Campbell	Gemma Winter	Coronation Street
2017	Elisabeth Dermot Walsh	Zara Carmichael	Doctors
2017	Tameka Empson	Kim Fox-Hubbard	EastEnders
2017	Dominic Brunt	Paddy Kirk	Emmerdale
2017	Nicole Barber-Lane	Myra McQueen	Hollyoaks
2018	Ian Midlane	Al Haskey	Doctors
2018	Louiza Patikas	Moira Pollock	Coronation Street
2018	Nitin Ganatra	Masood Ahmed	EastEnders
2018	Sally Dexter	Faith Dingle	Emmerdale
2018	Nicole Barber-Lane	Myra McQueen	Hollyoaks
2019	Sarah Moyle	Valerie Pitman	Doctors
2019	Patti Clare	Mary Taylor	Coronation Street
2019	Tameka Empson	Kim Fox-Hubbard	EastEnders
2019	Nicola Wheeler	Nicola King	Emmerdale
2019	Jessamy Stoddart	Liberty Savage	Hollyoaks
2022	Tameka Empson	Kim Fox	EastEnders
2022	Jane Hazlegrove	Bernie Winter	Coronation Street
2022	Sarah Moyle	Valerie Pitman	Doctors
2022	Lisa Riley	Mandy Dingle	Emmerdale
2022	Chelsee Healey	Goldie McQueen	Hollyoaks
2023	Maureen Lipman	Evelyn Plummer	Coronation Street
2023	Ian Midlane	Al Haskey	Doctors
2023	Jonny Freeman	Reiss Colwell	EastEnders
2023	Samantha Giles	Bernice Blackstock	Emmerdale
2023	Kieron Richardson	Ste Hay	Hollyoaks
2025	Patsy Palmer	Bianca Jackson	EastEnders
2025	Jack P. Shepherd	David Platt	Coronation Street
2025	Nicola Wheeler	Nicola King	Emmerdale
2025	Nicole Barber-Lane	Myra McQueen	Hollyoaks

== Achievements ==
=== Performers with multiple wins ===
Actress	Role	Soap opera	Wins	Nominations (Note: These nominations did not result in a win.)
Patti Clare	Mary Taylor	Coronation Street	3	1
Maggie Jones	Blanche Hunt	Coronation Street	2	0

=== Wins and nominations by soap ===
Soap opera	Wins	Nominations (Note: These nominations did not result in a win.)
Coronation Street	15	8
EastEnders	3	20
Hollyoaks	2	18
Doctors	2	9
Emmerdale	1	18
Brookside	1	1
Family Affairs	0	2
Night and Day	0	1
