= Moira Pollock =

Fictional character from Coronation Street

- Coronation Street character
- Portrayed by: Louiza Patikas
- Duration: 2017–20
- First appearance: 12 July 2017
- Last appearance: 6 January 2020
- Introduced by: Kate Oates
In-universe information
- Occupation: Practice Manager
- Husband: Stuart Pollock

Moira Pollock is a fictional character from the British ITV soap opera Coronation Street, played by Louiza Patikas. She made her first appearance on 12 July 2017. Patikas appeared on Coronation Street whilst continuing to appear in the radio soap opera The Archers at the same time, which she did not find difficult to manage. Moira was introduced as manager of the Weatherfield Medical Centre in a storyline that sees established character Liz McDonald (Beverley Callard) begin work there. Moira was characterised as being rude, feisty and a battleaxe, with Patikas believing that Moira sees herself better than others see her. Moira was used to create comedy on the soap and her early storyline involved her clashes with Liz at the centre. Callard praised the storyline and found it amusing, whilst Patikas praised the character and enjoyed working with Callard.

Following other comedic storylines, Moira then forms a romance with Colin Callen (Jim Moir) and is fired from her job for misconduct. Moira departed with Colin in November 2017, but returned in February 2018 and continued making appearances until January 2020. Moira's other storylines have involved her crush on Jan Lozinski (Piotr Baumann) and her friendship with Liz. Moira was greatly received by viewers and critics, who enjoyed the character's comedy. Patikas herself loved the character and enjoyed working on Coronation Street. For her role as Moira, Patikas was nominated for British Soap Award for Best Comedy Performance and longlisted for "Funniest Female" at the Inside Soap Awards in 2018.

== Casting and characterisation ==
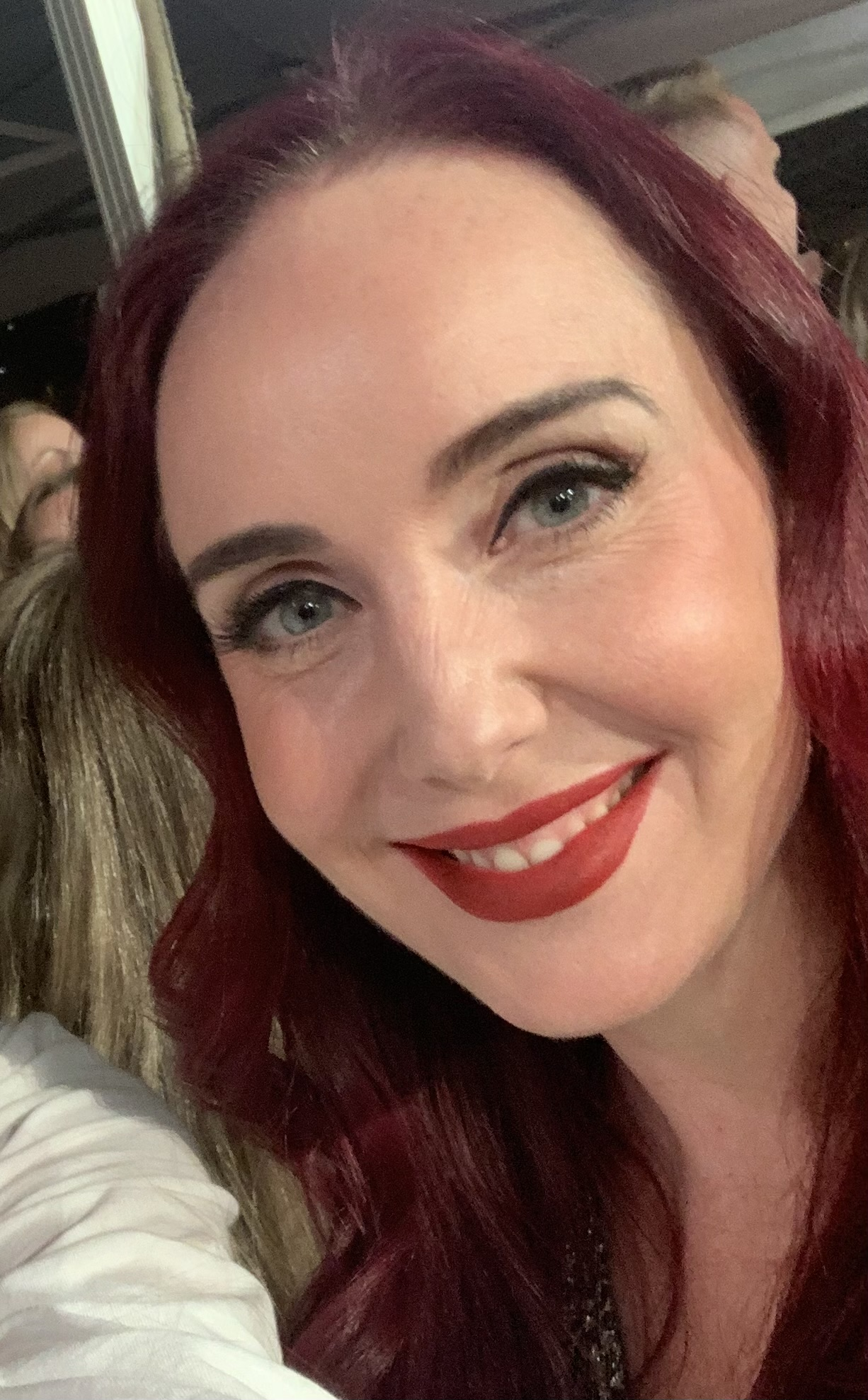
Executive producer Kate Oates (pictured) was excited to welcome Patikas to the soap.

In June 2017, it was announced that British actress Louiza Patikas, well-known for her long-running role as Helen Titchener in the radio soap opera The Archers, would be joining the cast of Coronation Street as Moira Pollock, an office manager for the soap opera's fictional Weatherfield Medical Centre. It was teased that Moira would "ruffle more than a few feathers" and that she would "butt heads" with established character Liz McDonald (Beverley Callard), who starts working as a receptionist at the medical centre. It was also teased that Moira would turn the medical centre into "quite the uncomfortable workplace before too long". Patikas was "cock-a-hoop" to be joining the soap opera, calling it a "a fantastic show which I've always loved for its superb writing and iconic characters". Coronation Street producer Kate Oates was excited to welcome Patikas to the soap opera, commenting, "Louiza is no stranger to long-running drama; but as Moira, viewers will get to see another side to her – and enjoy her amazing talent for comedy". That July, pictures of Patikas in character were released, which showed Moira heading out to a meeting and leaving Liz in charge of reception.

Speaking about her first day working on the soap, Patikas told Inside Soap that she felt very nervous and "completely petrified", but knew that she would feel less nervous with time. Patikas' was in a "Visiting Artists Dressing Room", which she liked as it was shared by other new cast members that would come and go, adding, "you feel like you're one of many people starting out". Patikas did not find it difficult balancing her work between Coronation Street and The Archers and revealed that both soaps were happy for her to be on both. When asked which other character she would play from Coronation Street, Patikas said that she would love to portray one of the "old iconic" characters like Hilda Ogden (Jean Alexander) or Elsie Tanner (Pat Phoenix) so that she could try a Northern accent and portray someone as different to herself as possible. Moira's first appearance as Moira aired on 12 July of that year. After she began appearing as Moira, Patikas found it strange to be recognised by members of the public.

Moira was described by ITVX as "forthright and feisty". Moira was also described as a battleaxe. Patikas described Moira as someone who sees herself differently from the way other sees her, which the actress believed was slightly "charming" but probably "excruciating and maddening" for other characters. When asked if she would be friends with Moira in real life, Patikas explained that whilst she would love to have a drink with her as she believes that Moira is a bit "outrageous" and "quite fun", she would "absolutely" not be able to work with her for more than an hour. However, Patikas added that she loves Moira and called her "fabulous", adding, "The Corrie writers are phenomenal. As an actor, you get to know who they are all and how they write – and they seem to quite enjoy writing for her". Patikas added that she loves Moira's comedy, saying "She's brilliant, I love her!" Speaking about Moira's wardrobe, Patikas revealed that Moira always has a colour co-ordinated hankey.

== Development ==
Patikas made her first appearance as Moira in the episode broadcast on 12 July 2017. Moira is introduced in a storyline that sees established character Liz McDonald (Beverley Callard) become the new receptionist at the medical centre after being forced to leave her job at the pub. Liz ends up clashing with Moira, her boss, on several occasions. Callard told Inside Soap that Moira is the "bitch from hell" but also called it "very funny" as "Liz gets it very wrong on her first day" by wearing the same clothing that she wore at the pub, including "sequins" and "big jackets", which prompts Moira to tell her that she is giving patients a migraine and orders her to wear beige from now on, which Callard called "fantastic". Moira's actions make Liz' attempt to enjoy her job difficult and she gets "little respite" from Moira later on in the week, especially when Moira leaves Liz in charge with a lot of patients, which leads her to lose her cool. Callard called the storyline "amusing", adding, "Liz has a new relationship with Moira, and you can't tell whether this woman is out-and-out horrible, or if she doesn't know she's doing it. It's really good". Patikas enjoyed working with Callard, calling her "so much fun", and revealed that the paired would laugh so much that the directors would sometimes have to let them "get it out" of their "systems". She praised Callard's professionalism and praised her acting skills, saying that she had learned a lot from her. She added that she loved Callard and believed she had accidentally texted her too much.

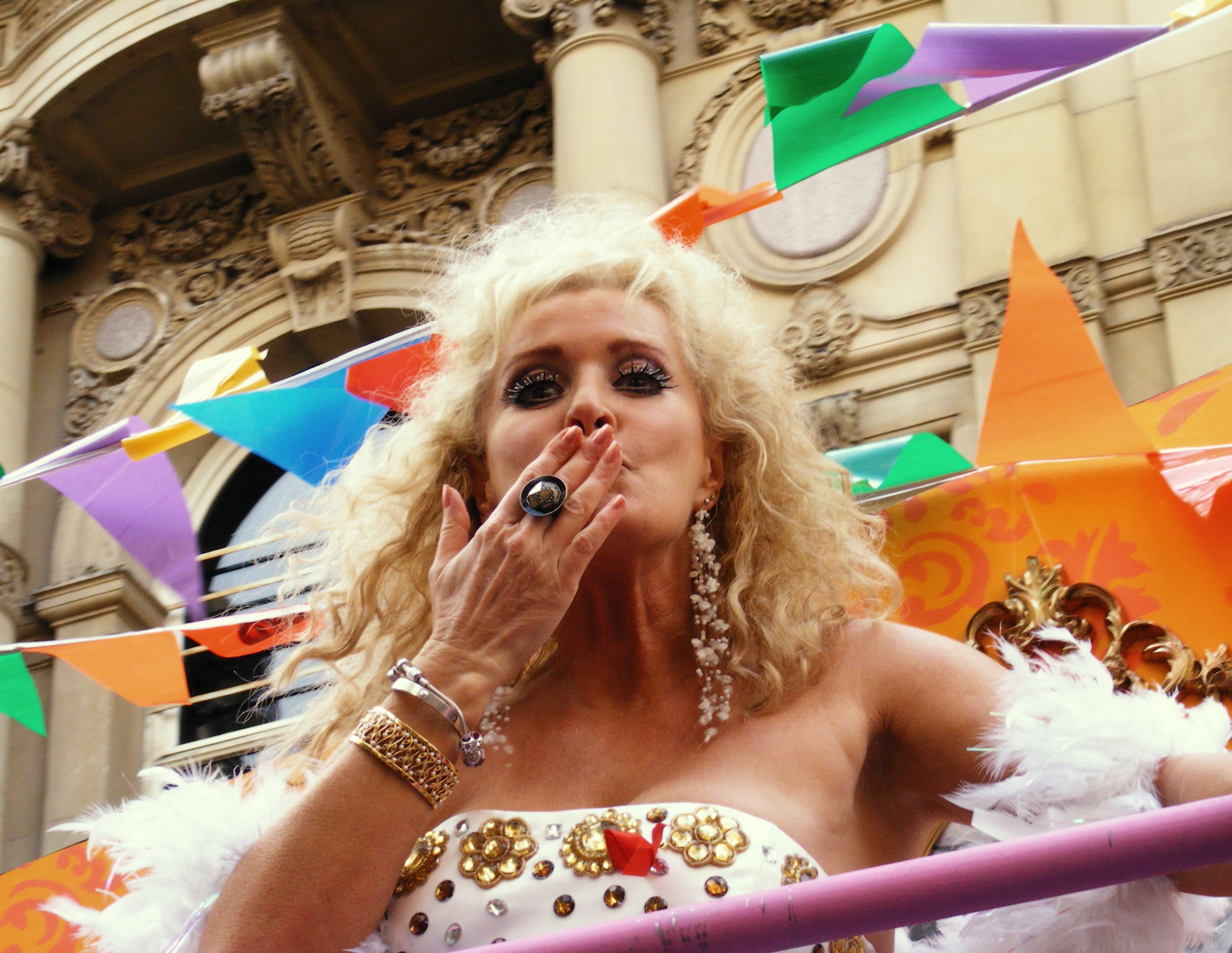
Beverley Callard (pictured), who portrays Liz, praised Moira's introduction storyline.

In a later storyline, Moira later insists that she moves in with Liz. Afterwards, Dev Alahan (Jimmi Harkishin) sets Liz' son Steve McDonald (Simon Gregson) on a blind date with Moira as part of a double date, which Steve is not happy about, and they end up having a "terrible time". Moira was then given new character Colin Callen (Jim Moir) as a love interest. Patikas was happy but nervous to work with Moir as he had long been her "comedy hero"; however, she added that he was also "star-struck" as he had been a fan of the soap for years, which she found "cute" and "lovely" as they had both been "thrown in together". Patikas called him "fantastic" and missed him after he left, adding, "I loved every second of working with him". In the storyline, Colin asks Moira to tamper with Norris Cole's (Malcolm Hebden) blood samples as he believes that Norris is his father. Moira is initially annoyed when she is asked to do that, but the pair grow closer and spend the night together, so she goes ahead with getting the DNA sample. However, Moira is caught and she is fired from her job at the medical centre. Later at the pub, Moira expresses surprise that she was tempted by Colin's charm as she had always stuck by the rules, but when Colin arrives, she cannot resist and the pair kiss "passionately", which leaves the other characters watching "stunned and grossed out". After being forced to leave her job at the medical centre, Moira leaves with Colin in the episode broadcast on 23 November 2017 after he invites her to come with him to Stoke-on-Trent. Moira's exit had been previously hinted by Digital Spy due to Moira's guest stint on the soap coming to an end.

In February 2018, it was announced that Moira would be returning to the soap later that month. Her return aired on 28 February of that year. In the storyline, Liz is "left in despair" when Dr Susan Gaddas (Christine Mackie) tells her that Moira has successfully made a claim to an employment tribunal and will be returning to her job, leaving Liz in "dismay". Moira returns to the pub to celebrate her return to work and asks Liz' good friend Eileen Grimshaw (Sue Cleaver) to have a drink with her. Liz hides in the bathroom of the pub from Moira as she is unable to face her, especially as she called Moira mentally unstable. Patikas said in 2018 that she wanted to work more with all of the "incredible" cast of Coronation Street, including Sally Dynevor and Connie Hyde, who portray sisters Sally Webster and Gina Seddon. In 2019, Moira develops an attraction towards Jan Lozinski (Piotr Baumann), with it being suggested by Digital Spy that there could be a love triangle between Moira, Jan and Eileen. Moira ends up confiding in Eileen that she is interested in Jan and is distracted by him, which surprises Eileen as she is interested in him herself. Moira is upset as she believes that Jan is interested in Mary Taylor (Patti Clare), but Eileen clarifies that he was just trying to let Mary down gently, which makes Moira more determined to date him. Patikas then made her final appearance as Moira in the episode that originally aired on 6 January 2020. Patikas did not make an official exit and she has not appeared since.

== Storylines ==
Moira is introduced as Liz McDonald's (Beverley Callard) new boss at the Weatherfield Medical Centre. On Liz' first day as a receptionist, the women clash over Liz' lack of professionalism and Moira disapproves of her Peruvian God statue because of its religious connotations. Moira further insults Liz by criticising the pub that she worked at and telling her to smoke at the back entrance to not give the medical centre a bad image. Liz tells her son Steve McDonald (Simon Gregson) that Moira constantly switches from criticising to complimenting her, which she finds frustrating. Liz convinces Moira to leave her husband, Stuart Pollock (Mark Cameron), after he scams and tries to flirt with her, but this results in Moira moving in with her, which Liz is not happy about. Whilst Moira considers Liz a good friend, Liz does not like her. Whilst staying with Liz, she annoys Steve by reorganising his fridge and telling him to do yoga to get fit. Steve's friend Dev Alahan (Jimmi Harkishin) later sets Moira and Steve on a blind date, much to Steve's horror, but Moira lets him down gently by telling him he is not her type.

Moira becomes romantically involved with Colin Callen (Jim Moir) as they bond over their experiences in Lisbon. Colin tells Moira that he believes that his father is Norris Cole (Malcolm Hebden) and convinces her to steal Norris's blood sample in order to take a DNA test to see if they are related. When Colin reveals what Moira did, she is then fired by Dr Susan Gaddas (Christine Mackie) for gross misconduct and she leaves Weatherfield to go to Stoke-on-Trent with Colin. However, months later she returns after winning her tribunal to get her job back after Liz told them that she was mentally unstable. Liz hides from her, worried that she heard the description, but Moira reveals that Liz' evidence proved that it was unfair dismissal and she thanks her for her friendship. Moira reveals that she and Colin broke up and he blamed her "erratic behaviour", which Moira believes is due to being peri-menopausal. Moira winds up Liz and her friend Eileen Grimshaw (Sue Cleaver) and annoys most of the guests at Eileen's party by getting drunk and telling them the gossip that she heard about them. Moira begins to suspect that Liz has feelings for married man Johnny Connor (Richard Hawley), and despite Liz' denials it turns out to be true when they have a brief affair. Liz confides in Moira about their kiss and she encourages her to go for him.

Moira later annoys the medical centre's new counsellor, Toyah Battersby (Georgia Taylor), by criticising her "hippy" look. Moira develops a romantic crush on Jan Lozinski (Piotr Baumann), though he is more interested in Eileen. Moira is last seen when Evelyn Plummer (Maureen Lipman) demands to see the medical records of her great-granddaughter Hope Dobbs (Isabella Flanagan), and she annoys Evelyn by making a joke.

== Reception ==
For her portrayal of Moira, Patikas was nominated for the Best Comedy Performance award at the 2018 British Soap Awards. Patikas was also longlisted for "Funniest Female" at the 2018 Inside Soap Awards.

Allison Jones from Inside Soap called Moira "mean spirited", "malicious" and the "sassy superior" of Liz. She also called Liz Moira's "minion" and questioned whether Moira would let Liz keep her job at the medical centre. The magazine later called Moira a "rude" receptionist. Sarah Ellis from the same magazine called Moira amazing and joked that Moira's friends "think she's less Pollock and more pillock", and added "We all know a Moira. (And if not, maybe we are the Moira!)" Ellis' colleague, Laura-Jayne Tyler, wrote that she could not get "enough" of Liz' bickering with "battleaxe" Moira and contributed it to being "absolute TV Gold". After Moira's 2017 exit, Daniel Kilkelly from Digital Spy questioned whether Moira and Colin would "go off into the sunset together". When Moira returned a few months later, Kilkelly wrote that Moira was "back to cause trouble at the medical centre" and called her return a "shock" after she had "walked off into the sunset with eccentric Colin". Kilkelly added that Moira had left the medical centre "in disgrace" and questioned whether Moira and Liz would ever be on friendly terms, adding, "Liz never got along with bossy Moira during their time working together – even after Moira insisted on moving in as her housemate". A writer from Inside Soap added that Moira had made a "big impression" on the street.

Discussing Steve and Moira's blind date, a writer from Soaplife wrote that Moira's "chilly personality" could turn "everyone's dinner cold!" The writer called the date a "disaster" and joked that Steve would reconsider his friendship with Dev after he set him up with Moira. They also called her "Moira the misery". Hayley Minn from the Daily Mirror reported how viewers expressed on social media that they felt "severely affected" and "grossed out" by Moira and Colin's "shock" but "passionate" kiss. Minn called the two characters "oddball[s]" and wrote that "Corrie viewers found the scenes just as vile" as the other characters did, adding that nobody could "deal" with it. In 2018, when wondering how physic Rosemary Piper (Sophie Thompson) knew so much about other Weatherfield residents, Kerry Barrett from the same magazine speculated that Rosemary could be the one giving her the details as she is a "great one for gossip". In 2018, Beth Allcock from OK! wrote that Moira became an "instant fan hit" when she debuted in 2017 and believed that she was one of the most popular Coronation Street characters of 2018; she added that Patikas had impressed so much with her portrayal that she had been nominated for a British Soap Award and believed that the actress would make "viewers laugh for many episodes to come". Allcock's colleague, Alana Anderson, called Moira a "fiery redhead". In 2023, Alison Graves from OK! called the character a "medical busy body" and believe that her 2020 departure was "mysterious".
