= Angie Appleton =

Fictional character from Coronation Street

- Coronation Street character
- Portrayed by: Victoria Ekanoye
- Duration: 2017–2019
- First appearance: Episode 9234; 21 August 2017
- Last appearance: Episode 9660; 7 January 2019
- Introduced by: Kate Oates
In-universe information
- Occupation: Accountant
- Husband: Jude Appleton
- Sons: George Appleton

Angie Appleton is a fictional character from the British ITV soap opera Coronation Street, played by Victoria Ekanoye. She made her first appearance on 21 August 2017 and then returned that October. Ekanoye was happy to be cast in the soap as she and her mother were fans of Coronation Street. Angie was introduced as the wife of Jude Appleton (Paddy Wallace) and the mother of his son, George Appleton (Romeo Cheetham-Karcz). The family arrive to Weatherfield for the wedding of Jude's mother, Mary Taylor (Patti Clare), which is revealed to be a charade to win a competition. The family later move to Weatherfield from their home in South Africa, which Angie is unhappy about.

Angie's initial storylines saw her feuding with Mary, and she later suspects that Mary is hurting George after he continuously falls ill whilst under her care. Ekanoye enjoyed working with Clare during the storyline. Angie was used to raise awareness of postnatal depression when Angie admits that she is struggling to bond with George. Mary and Angie begin to get along better and Angie also develops a friendship with Toyah Battersby (Georgia Taylor), but more heartbreak follows for Angie when she finds out that Jude has lied to her for years about his job. The betrayal leads Angie to almost kiss her colleague Adam Barlow (Sam Robertson), who Ekanoye thought would be good for Angie. Despite trying to make it work, Jude and Angie's marriage breaks down and Angie exposes Jude when he lies numerous other times. In December 2018, it was announced that Ekanoye would be departing as Angie, and Angie and George's last episode aired on 7 January 2019, where they leave to return to South Africa.

Angie appeared in 94 episodes of the soap. The character initially had mixed reactions from fans regarding Angie's feud with Mary, with some fans believing that Angie was behaving badly and others sympathising with her. Ekanoye was worried that fans would hate Angie and was surprised by the amount of fans that sympathised with the character. Angie's postnatal depression storyline was praised for raising awareness of the condition. Fans speculated that Angie would begin a relationship with Adam following their near-kiss, with some fans shipping the pair. However, Angie's departure was criticised by fans and critics as they felt that Angie had been underused as a character and had more potential. Her departure was considered emotional but also disappointing. Critics often discussed the hard times that Angie endured during her time in the soap, with some believing that she deserved a better partner than Jude.

== Casting and characterisation ==
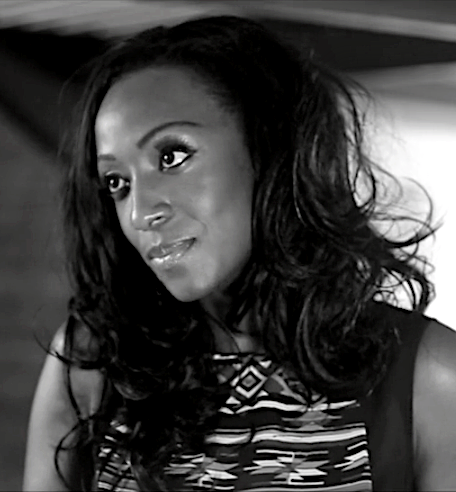
Victoria Ekanoye grew up watching Coronation Street.

Victoria Ekanoye made her first appearance as Angie Appleton in the episode that originally aired on 21 August 2017, with her casting being announced prior to the episode airing. Angie was introduced as part of the soap's "brand new family", which included Angie's husband, Jude Appleton (Paddy Wallace), and their baby son, George Appleton (Romeo Cheetham-Karcz). Wallace had previously appeared as Jude in December 2016 as the long-lost son of Mary Taylor (Patti Clare). Ekanoye started filming as Angie at the same time that she was filming The Royals in the role of Rachel, and she found herself working "a lot harder and faster" in the soap due to the quicker turnaround, with Ekanoye commenting that she had a "huge" script pile. Due to filming both projects at the same time at the beginning of her tenure at Coronation Street, the actress had to get into a different headspace due to the different accents, with Angie being from North West England and Rachel having Received Pronunciation. Ekanoye noted that the characters of Angie and Rachel were completely different.

Speaking about joining the soap, Ekanoye, who grew up watching Coronation Street, called it a "surreal scenario to see it suddenly becoming my reality", adding that it is "mind boggling, but you just have to get your professional head on and do your job." Ekanoye was a fan of the soap from a young age and as a child used to put on "musicals" of the soap for her mum, with her favourite character being "iconic" Bet Lynch (Julie Goodyear). She praised the cast for being friendly and "so on point with their work", and was grateful to Clare for taking her "under her wing" and being so "sweet". She called working with the baby portrayer of George "amazing", commenting that he made her feel "broody" at times, and noted that it was unusual that there was only one baby playing him. She revealed that he would often cry due to teething and that his mother was always on set.

Speaking about the character, Ekanoye noted that Angie was a "strong minded" businesswoman before giving birth to her son, and that she is "itching" to get back to work in finance law. The actress enjoyed wearing Angie's work clothes, including her mini dresses, calling them "very nice" and "quite fitted", but added that they would "leave no room for having a large lunch", with the actress joking that she would use the baby to hide her "food belly". Ekanoye believed that Angie would be good friends with returning character Carla Connor (Alison King) due to their similar personalities, but the actress also liked Angie's friendship with Toyah Battersby (Georgia Taylor) and hoped that it would continue. The actress has also admitted that Angie is struggling with motherhood. Ekanoye was happy about the introduction of Angie and the family, saying ""Having a family involved has brought a whole new side to Mary which you didn't necessarily have before. I love the fact we've been able to explore Mary's character as well as having us to come into it and our own little Romeo."

== Development ==
=== Introduction ===
Explaining the character's backstory, Ekanoye revealed that Angie and Jude met at university and then moved to South Africa for a new life. The couple and George arrive in Weatherfield in "eager anticipation" for Mary's wedding to Norris Cole (Malcolm Hebden), unaware that is a "charade". Mary can "barely contain her excitement" when the family arrives, but Angie quickly begins to "spot signs" that something does not seem "quite right" between Mary and Norris. Ekanoye explained that whilst Jude is happy for his mother, Angie "picks up on all the micro expressions" between her and Norris, adding that she "keeps noticing their body language and quickly becomes convinced that all is not as it seems". The actress expressed her delight in joining their unit, saying, "Patti and Malcolm are such a great duo and we laugh all the time on set, even when we shouldn't be. Connecting new characters with people who are already established really works. And Mary and Norris are such fan favourites. I feel very lucky that the two of them in particular are my foundation blocks. I love it. There's nothing about it that I don't like!" After the wedding, Mary confesses to her that Jude was conceived after she was raped as a teenager, which leaves Angie "devastated" for Mary. Ekanoye explained that whilst Angie "really feels for her on a woman-to-woman level", she knows that Jude needs to be told, even though it will "break his heart". The actress added that Angie is "juggling a lot of emotions" and explained that things would not be "plain sailing", saying "It's a big thing for Mary to have kept to herself and Jude will also feel betrayed. Angie will have to be there for both of them". After the wedding, Jude, Angie and George return that October and move in with Mary and Norris. Ekanoye explained that whilst Jude is happy about moving to Weatherfield, for Angie it is not what she "expected or wanted to happen". The actress also noted that Angie and Mary would clash due to Mary pushing for Jude to "settle close by" in order to have her family around, but speculated that Mary and Angie could later become a "formidable force", explaining that there may be "happier times" ahead if "they can just get past their differences".

=== Feud with Mary and postpartum depression ===
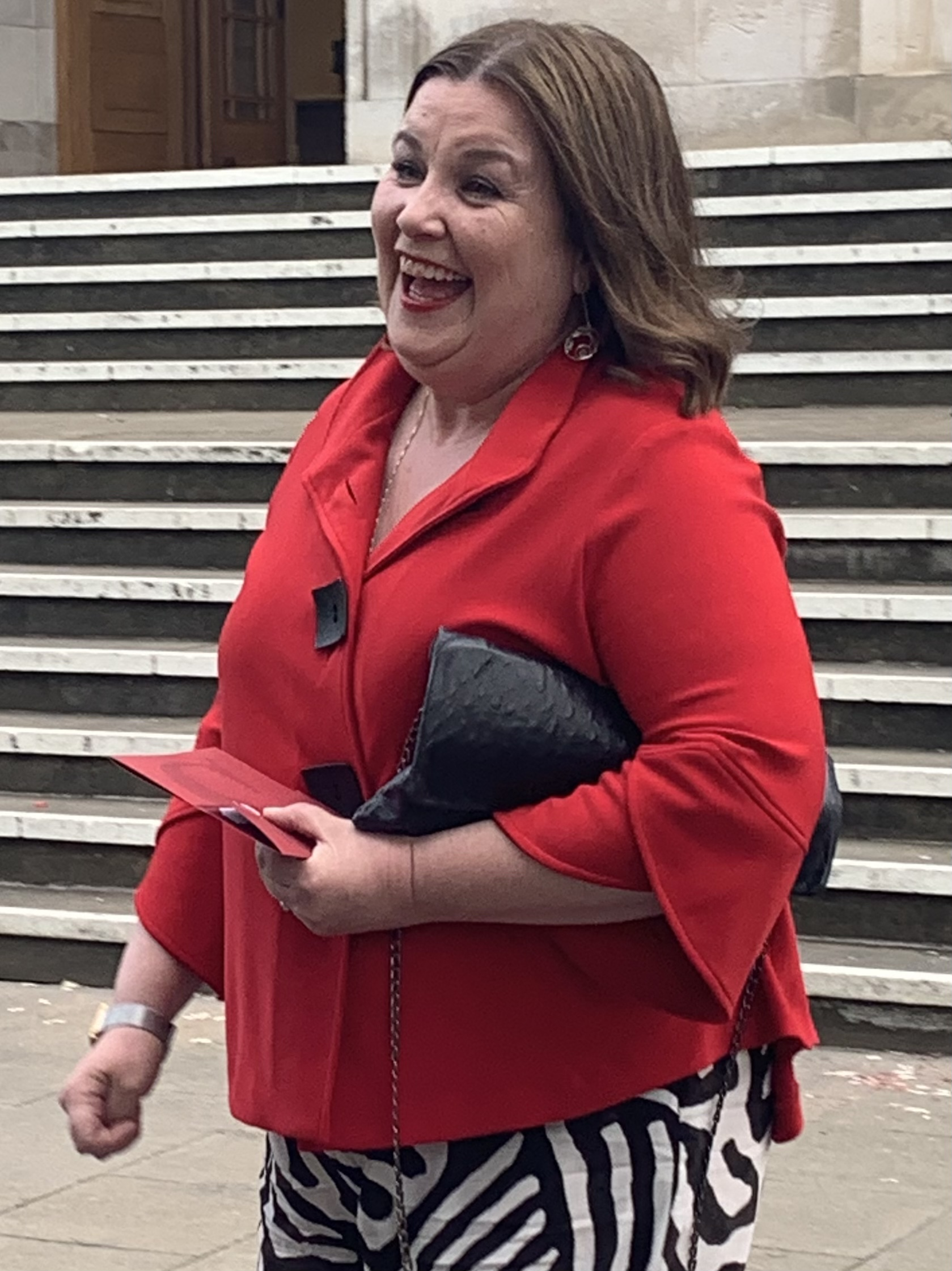
Patti Clare has portrayed Angie's mother in law, Mary, since 2008.

Ekanoye explained that Mary and Jude's reunion has changed Angie's life and she has had to abandon her "high-flying life" in South Africa. Angie begins to feel suffocated by Mary, with Ekanoye explaining that "Angie wants George to have his grandma, but this is also her first baby. She's missing out on all these important moments because Mary is constantly interrupting or taking over." The actress added that this is causing a rift between her and Jude, with Angie believing that his priority should be his wife and child, especially as he has only met Mary recently. When Angie admits to Toyah that she finds Mary very "overbearing" and that she feels like she does not get any quality time with Jude or George anymore, and after admitting this to Jude, the couple decide to move back to South Africa. Mary angers Angie when she tries to make them miss their flight, but Angie and Jude are then forced to rush George to hospital after realising he is ill, with the pair being "worried sick". At the hospital, Angie is left "stunned" when she is told that she may have postnatal depression after she admits to a member of staff that she has been struggling with her son.

Angie is reluctant to accept that she may have postnatal depression, and Mary ends up thinking that Angie has a drinking problem when Angie takes home a leaflet about it by mistake. Ekanoye noted that Angie's feud with Mary had mixed reactions; whilst some fans were "supportive" of Angie due to Mary being "overwhelming" with her behaviour over the baby, others fans believed that Angie was being a "right cow", which is how producers wanted Ekanoye to portray the character. The actress was happy about the reaction as she thought that she had done a good job, believing that people commenting proved she had made an "impact". Ekanoye spoke to her mother who loves the soap, with Mary being her favourite character. She told her daughter that whilst she understood Mary's view, she could see that Angie is struggling with the postnatal depression and thought that Mary and Angie would be friends "eventually". Ekanoye was worried that many fans would hate Angie due to Mary being such a popular character, but many enjoyed seeing the new "dimensions" being added to the storyline and the actress was surprised with how many fans sympathised with her. Ekanoye joked that she would "never" want a mother-in-law like Mary, but noted that she enjoyed working with Clare, calling her "sweet", "funny" and a "good egg" with great "energy".

Mary then suspects that "poor Angie" has a drinking problem after finding a leaflet about heavy drinking in Angie's bag, not knowing that Angie actually went to see a doctor about fearing that she is struggling to bond with George. Clare explained that Mary "puts two and two together and comes up with seven" and thinks that this is the explanation for "Angie's strange behaviour", as Mary has been "constantly" trying to find out why Angie sometimes acts so "distant and distracted". Wanting to help Angie, Mary throws a dinner party with Angie, Jude, Toyah and Toyah's partner Peter Barlow (Chris Gascoyne), and she "encourages Peter to share some of his horror stories of alcoholism", which makes the other guests bemused. Clare explained that this is Mary having the "best of intentions" and hoping that this will make Angie aware that she has a problem by having someone openly talk about their experiences with drinking, but it all becomes a bit "heavy-handed" due to Mary's "missing of the bark". Later, when Angie is able to confide in Toyah about why she is not feeling herself, Toyah suggests that she may have postnatal depression, which gives her food for thought.

After George falls ill again whilst in Mary's care, Angie's "maternal instincts kick in" and she drives George to the hospital, which scares Mary as she believes that Angie is above the legal limit, leading her to report her daughter in law for driving under the influence. Clare explained that Mary would not be able to live with herself if there was a crash and believes she is doing the right thing by calling the police. Angie is then pulled over by the police and has to do a breath test, where she realises that Mary reported her. Mary berates Angie until the police inform her that Angie is "well under the limit", and an angry Angie later tells Jude, who is furious with Mary and dismisses her claims that something is wrong with Angie. When Mary later finds out that Angie has postnatal depression, she makes "another heartfelt apology", having realised that she had misjudged Angie completely and that she "messed up" badly with Angie by calling the police.

The storyline then intensifies when Mary is accused of harming George. George has been having to go to hospital frequently and Angie had been becoming increasingly suspicious of Mary, with Ekanoye explaining that Angie sees Mary as the "common denominator" due to George getting sick every time he is with her, suggesting that Mary is the "catalyst". Whilst Jude disagrees, when George is rushed to the hospital after becoming very unwell whilst being looked after Mary at the florist, the doctors are unable to figure out what is wrong with him, making Angie believe that she is not going "crazy" and hope that Jude will agree. Despite seeing Angie's logic, Jude sticks up for his mother, which causes the pair to argue, but they then rush to George when his life is "clearly in danger" and to their surprise Mary emerges from the room. This causes a very angry Angie to become "primitive and very visceral", feeling that Mary is hurting the baby and that not even the hospital is safe from her, with Ekanoye explaining that "Whatever is wrong with George, Mary is undoubtedly the cause. Angie wants to eliminate her mother-in-law from her baby's life. Whether this means Angie finally persuades Jude to go back to South Africa, you'll have to wait and see." Clare revealed that the reason behind George's illness would be revealed, and that she was happy to be able to explore another side to Mary and admitted that Mary has a "fraught relationship" with Angie. Jude and Angie later find out that Mary is not the cause of George's illness, which delighted fans. Fans had previously speculated that George was allergic to bananas and pollen, the latter being triggered by Mary working in flower shop.

=== Lies and breakdown of marriage ===
In July 2018, Ekanoye revealed that more of Angie's backstory would be explored, explaining "Towards the end of the year, we're going to see a lot more focus on Angie and her past and to see why she is the way that she is and where that's come from". The actress had had a meeting with the soap's executive producer, Iain MacLeod, where they spoke about Angie's backstory and what they were going to do with the character. Ekanoye was excited to work with MacLeod, calling him "lovely", and said that the meeting went "really, really well", though she admitted that she would miss his predecessor Kate Oates "like crazy", calling her a "power woman" and "amazing". Ekanoye revealed that Angie has been "really struggling", citing initially wanting to move to Weatherfield, the post-natal depression and not being to work as reasons as reasons for the struggle. Charlotte Tutton from OK! speculated that Angie's past would be "dark".

Early that year, a storyline began which revealed that Jude had lied about his job and was not a marine biologist, with the revelation being revealed when Mary pressures him into getting a job to help Angie financially, which leads to the discovery. Desperate for Angie to not discover that he is in fact working in a gift shop, he lies to her that some of his "fellow marine biologists" co-workers have been bullying him, which leads to Angie turning up at his work to meet them. To keep up the lie, Jude gets Mary's help and she hires actors to pose as the co-workers, which ends up going "spectacularly wrong" and leads to Angie finding out that Jude has been lying about his career to her for a "long while". Speaking about the betrayal, Ekanoye explained, "It's the fact that [Jude] lied to [Angie] for so long, every single day for two years. It's not like it was a lie two years ago, it's the fact that every single day throughout their life together, their marriage, getting pregnant, through all of that, every single day he was leaving for work and lying to her. He was lying so much about tiny little things to cover for it and the fact he found that so easy." The revelation leads to their marriage potentially being "on the rocks" and a furious Angie leaving to clear her head. She ends up confiding in Adam Barlow (Sam Robertson) for support, with Daniel Kilkelly from Digital Spy hinting that the pair are getting "closer" and the Daily Mirror's Jenny Desborough speculating that things could become "steamy". Angie "pours her heart out" to Adam over some alcoholic drinks and tries to kiss him, although Adam pulls away, aware that she loves Jude. Ekanoye praised Adam's actions, admitting that "Adam does tell it like it is". When Angie confesses the attempted kiss to Jude, he berates her for betraying her trust, but she reminds him that lied to her for two years, as well as telling him that she loved him as a person and not because of his job, and their conversation ends on a "decidedly frosty note".

"She's been miserable for quite a while. Post-natal depression is no laughing matter and so many women struggle from it, and I think it was that and all the other things surrounding it that made her really struggle to get by. Now it's difficult because she's not finding that respect for Jude. She's really struggling to find that, and you need that in a relationship but she's lost it."

— Ekanoye on Angie's struggles (2018)

With the marriage "hanging by a thread", Angie dreads their upcoming wedding anniversary due to the tension between the couple, and things get worse at their anniversary lunch, with it being clear that Angie does not see the marriage working out. When they go to see a marriage counsellor, Angie admits that she has lost respect for Jude and feels trapped in her marriage, leaving Jude "stunned". Angie decides to end the marriage, confiding in Adam that she sees no future with Jude and their relationship cannot be repaired. Jude, having discovered that Mary is planning a surprise vow renewal for the couple, asks Angie to wait one more day until publicising the split, thinking that the vow renewal will change her mind. Ekanoye explained that whilst Angie would not be angry at Mary, thinking that Mary is just "being Mary" and wanting the best for her son, she will "feel utter rage" at Jude due it being "entrapment", explaining that "All of it is under false pretence and over nothing, they've broken up!" The actress added:

"She [Angie] doesn't realise how deluded and in denial Jude is at all. So this is why it comes as such a massive blow to her. It's almost like she is being railroaded and forced to stay within a relationship that she doesn't want to be in... it's scary! She wants to break away but as kindly as possible. Never in a million years does she think it's going to be a vow renewal, because she just can't believe that Jude would be so stupid to think that would be the next step after everything."

At the vow renewal, Jude is nervous as he believes that his marriage is resting on this. When Angie arrives to the vow renewal, she is "floored" and "horrified" and asks to speak to Jude alone, who lies and tells her that Mary sprung this on him and asks her to "play along for Mary's sake". Later, Jude goes to "desperate measures" and lies that he saved the life of Roy Cropper (David Neilson), which "threatens to derail his marriage to Angie for good". Jude then lies about intending to become a paramedic, which proves to be "the final nail in the coffin". Ekanoye teased that there would be dark scenes where Jude's true nature is exposed. Viewers speculated whether Angie would begin a relationship with Adam, with Ekanoye telling Digital Spy at the 2018 British Soap Awards that "Ultimately Angie is still married and I personally think you should never jump from relationship to relationship". The actresses admitted that whilst there is chemistry between Adam and Angie and that "sparks fly" when they are together, she believed that "should have a little bit of time to focus on her and George and what's best for them". However, she hinted that something could happen later down the line, adding "they match quite well and he puts her in her place, which she needs after she's worn the trousers for so long" Ekanoye, who considers herself a "romantic at heart", hoped that Angie and Jude would work things out, but did not believe that was possible.

Jude eventually leaves after his lies are exposed, with his portrayer confirming that he had left the soap but that Jude's final scenes were yet to air. Ekanoye hinted that Angie may find a new love interest, admitting that Angie "had her little dalliance with Adam, and there's chemistry there, which there has been from the beginning and it's continuing so... we'll see. You never know, there might be somebody else on the Street that takes her eye... I don't know. I'm not saying anything... maybe a Christmas kiss under the mistletoe?" The actress also explained that Angie needs someone who "is going to be able to wear the trousers" due to Angie having done that for so long, and suggested that Adam would be a good choice and that Angie needs someone like that. Angie and Mary later face "their worst nightmare" and fear that Jude is dead when they are asked to identify a body.

=== Exit ===
"Angie was never the one really sold on moving to Manchester but managed to get her head around rebuilding her life so that Jude and George could be close to Mary. And despite a frosty start, Mary and Angie have managed to form a solid friendship."

— Duncan Lindsay on Angie (2018)

In December 2018, it was announced that Angie and George would be departing the soap following the conclusion of Jude's storyline. This followed Wallace's exit as Jude, which involved Mary tracking him down and discovering that he is "back to his old tricks" and lying about his name and profession to his new girlfriend. Digital Spy's Kilkelly teased that Angie's departure scenes would be "heartbreaking" for Mary. Their exit episode aired on 7 January 2019. Angie had appeared in 94 episodes of the soap by the time of her exit. Speaking of the exit, Duncan Lindsay from Metro revealed that with Jude's "true colours" having come out, "there is little keeping Angie in Weatherfield" and she decides to leave. Lindsay also revealed that Mary gives Angie her blessing, not wanting her life to be on hold just to stay close to her, but explained that it would not be "easy task" for Mary to say goodbye to George. Angie then leaves with George in a black cab for her "new life" in South Africa, waving "goodbye to Mary and Weatherfield one last time". Following her departure, Ekanoye teased that Angie may return, saying "I've honestly had the time of my life and I can't believe it's been 18 months, it's felt like no time but I guess time flies when you're having fun. There was a lot of stuff left unresolved and I may or may not be able to confirm those things. Adam's going to go out to visit and Mary will because of the amazing connection she has made between Angie and George so we'll see." In 2022, Ekanoye hinted at a return, saying "You can never say never – [Angie is] off in South Africa at the moment, isn't she, so we'll see!"

== Storylines ==
Angie, Jude and George come to Weatherfield for Jude's mother Mary Taylor (Patti Clare)'s wedding to Norris Cole (Malcolm Hebden), unaware that it is a ploy for Mary and Norris to win a wedding competition. Angie starts to suspect that something is not right between the couple. After the wedding, Mary confides in Angie that Jude was conceived after she was raped. Angie supports Jude, and Mary admits that the wedding is a scam. Jude forgives Mary and announces that he, Angie and George will be moving to Weatherfield, which annoys Angie as she had not been informed about the plans. Following the move, Angie remains unhappy about leaving her life in South Africa but feels unable to confide in Jude about it. Angie becomes friends with Toyah Battersby (Georgia Taylor), who she is able to confide in. Angie starts to become increasingly annoyed with Mary's interference in her parenting of George. George starts falling ill and needing to go to hospital. Mary suspects that Angie is an alcoholic and reports her to the police for drunk driving. When Angie is cleared by the police, Jude and Angie are furious at an apologetic Mary. Angie begins to suspect that Mary is harming George when he becomes suddenly ill every time he is in Mary's care. After Angie tells Jude her feelings, they plan to move back to South Africa but miss their flight when they have to rush George to hospital. Angie reports Mary to the police, but it is revealed that George is allergic to pollen, which had been repeatedly triggered due to Mary working in a floristry. Angie is upset at herself for not realising sooner and admits to the doctor that she is struggling to bond with George. The doctor suggests to Angie that she may have Postpartum depression. When Mary defends Angie against Sally Webster (Sally Dynevor)'s interference and Mary finds out about Angie's depression, the pair begin to get along better, and an apologetic Angie decides to stay in Weatherfield.

Angie begins working as an accountant for Tracy Barlow (Kate Ford) and Adam Barlow (Sam Robertson) separately. Angie is later shocked to discover that Jude has been lying to her about being a marine biologist since the beginning of their relationship. Feeling betrayed, Angie drinks and confides in Adam and tries to kiss him. Adam stops her and tells her that she loves Jude, and she goes home to admit the attempted kiss to Jude. Though Jude is initially angry, the pair try to move on, but Angie has lost respect for Jude. They attend counselling sessions and attempt to stay together for George's sake, but Angie later tells Jude that the relationship is no longer working and that they are over. Angie then feels humiliated when she is surprised with a vow renewal by Mary the next day and, upon learning that Jude was involved with planning it, publicly announces their split. However, Angie is impressed when Jude seemingly saves Roy Cropper (David Neilson)'s life and the two begin to get along better. However, Angie discovers that it was actually Ali Neeson (James Burrows) who saved Roy's life and that Jude has lied yet again, and Angie publicly exposes him once more. Angie tells him to leave their home and he abducts George, devastating Angie. However, Roy is able to convince Jude to give George to him to return to Angie. With Jude gone, Angie announces her intention to divorce him. Mary tries to track her son down several times and she and Angie are later called to identify a body that police believe is Jude. Angie confirms that the body is not Jude and this makes Mary believe that she still has feelings for him, though Angie dismisses these claims. Angie is offered her old job in South Africa back. Mary manages to track Jude down and realises that he is still lying, pretending to be a doctor and swindling his mother of £800. Mary tells Angie this and also convinces her to take the job. Angie is hesitant, not wanting to leave Mary on her own, but decides to go after realising thar Mary still has friends with her. George and Angie leave the next day, with Angie not wanting a gathering with all of her friends despite Mary's offer. Angie and George then leave in a taxi, saying goodbye to a tearful Mary.

== Reception ==
Following the arrival of Angie, Jude and George, Daniel Kilkelly from Digital Spy called it the beginning of "a brand new era for Mary", and questioned whether Angie would realise that Mary and Norris' marriage plans are a con. Angie's initial feud with Mary had mixed reactions from fans, with some being "supportive" of Angie due to Mary being "overwhelming" with her behaviour over the baby and others fans believing that Angie had acted poorly towards Mary. Katie Fitzpatrick from Manchester Evening News called Angie the "long-suffering wife" of Jude. Fitzpatrick also called the kiss between Angie and Adam "steamy" and a "Shock", and noted how fans on Twitter wanted the pair to be together and were "shipping" them. She also called Angie "Fiery". Emma Osborne from OK! wrote that Angie "shocked viewers by ending her turbulent marriage to husband Jude during the couple's marriage renewal". The soap was praised for raising awareness of postnatal depression through Angie's character, with fans praising the "hard-hitting new storyline about struggling mum Angie". Following Angie's split from Jude, Joe Anderton from Digital Spy wrote that Angie has "had a terrible time lately" and that she "deserves some happiness after Jude", adding that now she was "free to find love with someone who isn't a pathological fibber".

Garry Gillatt and Laura-Jayne Tyler from Inside Soap Angie's departure in their weekly "Hits & Misses!", writing "What a shame. What a waste". They commented that Angie should have had a plot of her own and suggested that it should have involved Adam. However, they also noted that Angie was "Finally free" of Jude, who they called "15 stone of surplus weight". A writer from the same magazine noted that Angie had "endured a terrible time" in Weatherfield in 2017. Duncan Lindsay from Metro called Angie's departure emotional and the scenes where Mary says goodbye to Angie and George "tearful". A writer from Female First noted how fans were disappointed by Angie's departure due to the character leaving "under the radar in the middle of an episode", which resulted in "somewhat of a supporter backlash". Rose Hill from the Daily Mirror wrote how viewers were "frustrated" with Angie's "disappointing" exit due to Angie having "so much more potential as a character", with some viewers expressing their sadness of Angie's departure on Twitter. Hill also noted that viewers "began to warm" to Angie when the truth about Adam was revealed, and called Angie and Mary's relationship "touching" in addition to Angie's "spark" with Adam.
