= Louiza Patikas =

English actress

- Born: 1976 or 1977 (age 48–49); Reigate, Surrey, England
- Education: St Bede's School
- Occupation: Actress
- Years active: 1999–present
- Spouse: Jonathan Aris (m. 2007)
- Children: 2
- Relatives: Ben Aris (father-in-law)

Louiza Patikas (born 1976 or 1977) is a British actress. She is known for her roles as Helen Archer in the BBC Radio 4 soap opera The Archers and Moira Pollock on the ITV1 soap opera Coronation Street.

== Career ==
Patikas has voiced Helen Archer on The Archers since 2000. Helen was the central role in a high-profile storyline about domestic abuse and coercive control. Patikas discussed the storyline on BBC Radio 4's Woman's Hour in March 2016. In December 2016, Patikas selected and presented her round-up of the year's radio highlights for BBC Radio 4's Pick of the Year.

In June 2017, it was announced Patikas would be joining the cast of the long-running ITV soap opera Coronation Street as medical-centre practice manager Moira Pollock. She left the show in November 2017. In February 2018, Patikas reprised her role as Moira. Her character last appeared in 2020.

== Personal life ==
In 2007, Patikas married the actor Jonathan Aris, and they have two children. They met on the set of the 2005 television film Planespotting. When not acting Patikas works as a journalist and fashion stylist.

=== Film and television ===
Year	Title	Role	Notes
1999	The Colour of Funny	Molly Mezner	Film
2001	Gimme 6	Christina	as Louisa Patikas
2003	Inside Out	Laura	Short film
2005	Planespotting	Olivia	Film
2017	Unforgotten	Amy East	S2. Episode: 1
2017–2020	Coronation Street	Moira Pollock	Regular role
2022	Grantchester	Eleanor Ingram	S7. Episode: 4
2024	Love Rat	Constable Kyriacou	TV Mini Series

=== Radio ===
Year	Title	Role(s)	Notes
2000–present	The Archers	Helen Archer	Regular role
2023	Lark Rise to Ambridge	Dorcas / Queenie	Main role

=== Video games ===
Year	Title	Role	Notes
2008	Age of Conan	Farmer / People / Additional voices	Microsoft Windows
2009	Risen	Sara / Anika / Gwen	English version
2009	BattleForge	Voice	PC
2009	Dragon Age: Origins	Arlessa Isolde	Xbox 360
2010	Xenoblade Chronicles	Linada	English version
2010	Fable III	Laura / Helen Flannel / Sarah	Xbox 360
2010	GoldenEye 007	Club Patron	PlayStation 3
2011	The Last Story	Zael's mom	Wii
2011	Dragon Age II: Mark of the Assassin	Arlessa Isolde / Orlesian Hunting Merchant / Chateau Haine Quartermaster	Xbox 360
2012	Mass Effect 3	Alliance Councilwoman	Xbox 360
2012	The Secret World	Mrs. Smith / Additional voices	PC
2017	Blackwood Crossing	Annabelle / Lucy / Dorothy	PlayStation 4
2018	Assassin's Creed Odyssey	Greek Civilian	PlayStation 4
2020	Immortals Fenyx Rising	Aphrodite	Xbox One
2020	Skylords Reborn	Warriors / Additional voices	PC
2021	It Takes Two	Joy	PlayStation 4
2022	Lego Star Wars: The Skywalker Saga	Additional voices	Nintendo Switch
2024	Flintlock: The Siege of Dawn	Rammuha	PlayStation 5

== Awards and nominations ==
Year	Award	Category	Nominated Work	Result	Ref.
2018	British Soap Awards	Best Comedy Performance	Coronation Street	Nominated	
