= Jonathan Aris =

English actor

- Occupation: Actor
- Years active: 1997–present
- Spouse: Louiza Patikas

Jonathan Aris is an English actor who has appeared in films, television, and theatre. He is known for his roles as the irascible policeman Anderson in the BBC series Sherlock, and as the angelic quartermaster in the Amazon Prime series Good Omens.

== Career ==
Aris has narrated TV documentaries produced and aired by the National Geographic Channel, and appeared as Philip Anderson in Sherlock.

In 2016, he appeared in Tutankhamun as the American Egyptologist Herbert Winlock, and appears as the angelic quartermaster in the Amazon Prime series Good Omens.

== Personal life ==
Aris is married to actress Louiza Patikas.

== Filmography ==
=== Film ===
Year	Title	Role	Notes
1997	The Jackal	Alexander Radzinski	
1997	Metroland	Dave	
1999	Topsy-Turvy	Wilhelm	
2000	Poirot Season 7 Episode 2 Lord Edgware Dies	Receptionist	
2002	Ali G Indahouse	Interviewer in Staines	
2002	Birthday Girl	D.I. O'Fetiger	
2007	Flawless	Boyle	
2009	Bright Star	Leigh Hunt	
2010	Gulliver's Travels	Lilliputian Scientist	
2012	Sightseers	Ian	
2013	The World's End	Group Leader	
2015	The Martian	Brendan Hatch	
2016	Race	Arthur Lill	
2016	Morgan	David Chance	
2016	Rogue One	Senator Nower Jebel	
2017	The Death of Stalin	Mezhnikov	
2017	All the Money in the World	Conservator	
2019	Get Duked!	Mr. Carlyle	
2019	Vivarium	Martin	
2019	Radioactive	Hetreed	
2021	Zone 414	Joseph Veidt	
2021	She Will	Podrick Lochran	
2024	Here	Earl Higgins	
TBA	Fortitude	TBA	Filming

=== Television ===
Year	Title	Role	Notes
1998	As Time Goes By	Waiter	Episode: "An Old Flame"
1998	Hornblower	Clerkly Officer	The Examination for Lieutenant
2000	Agatha Christie's Poirot	Receptionist	Episode: "Lord Edgware Dies"
2002	The Project	Bob	Television film
2003	Eroica	Paul Dorfmueller	Television film
2003–present	Mayday	Narrator	Documentary series, for episodes distributed in Australia, Asia and Europe (except for the UK in season 1), where the series is retitled Air Crash Investigation
2004	Not Only But Always	Jonathan Miller	Television film
2005	The Government Inspector	Bryan Wells	Television film
2005	Riot at the Rite	Jean Cocteau	Television film
2006	Beau Brummell: This Charming Man	Marquess of Worcester	Television film
2006	The Amazing Mrs Pritchard	Richard Leavis	Main cast
2006	Doc Martin: On the Edge	Gavin Peters	Television film
2007	Confessions of a Diary Secretary	Bernard	Television film
2008	Wallander	Albinsson	Episode: "One Step Behind"
2008	Merlin	Matthew	Episode: "The Moment of Truth"
2010	Being Human	Newsreader	Episode: "Serve God, Love Me and Mend"
2010	Spooks	Azis Aibek	Episode #9.3
2010–2016	Sherlock	Philip Anderson	Recurring role
2012	Silk	Liam King	Episode #2.4
2012	Peep Show	Ben Prenderghast	Episode: "Chairman Mark"
2015	The Game	Alan Montag	Main cast; miniseries
2015	Wolf Hall	James Bainham	2 episodes
2015	Humans	Robert	Recurring role (series 1)
2016	The Night Manager	Raymond Galt	Recurring role
2016	Tutankhamun	Herbert Eustis Winlock	Main cast
2016	Midsomer Murders	Archaeologist's husband	Episode: "Saints and Sinners"
2017	Stan Lee's Lucky Man	Coroner	Recurring role (series 2)
2017–2019	The End of the F***ing World	Clive	Recurring role
2018	Black Mirror	Crispin	Episode: "Bandersnatch"
2019	Good Omens	Quartermaster Angel	Episode: "The Doomsday Option"
2019	The War of the Worlds	Priest	2 episodes; miniseries
2020	Dracula	Captain Sokolov	Episode: "Blood Vessel"
2021	A Very British Scandal	Judge Wheatley	1 episode; miniseries
2022	His Dark Materials	Commander Roke	Main cast
2022	Avenue 5	Charles	Recurring role (season 2)
2023	The Sixth Commandment	DCI Mark Glover	Main cast
2024	Doctor Who	Hotel Manager	Episode: "Joy to the World"
2024	The Famous Five	Mr. Standing	Episode: "Mystery at the Prospect Hotel"
2024–2026	Red Eye	John Tennant	Recurring role
2025	Andor	Senator Nower Jebel	Episode: "Jedha, Kyber, Erso"
2025	Talamasca: The Secret Order	Gregory "Greg" Owen	Supporting role; 3 episodes
2025	Amadeus	Leopold Mozart	Miniseries

Key
†	Denotes TV productions that have not yet been released

=== Theatre ===
Year	Title	Role	Notes
2005	Death of a Salesman	Bernard	

=== Video games ===
Year	Title	Role
1997	Croc: Legend of the Gobbos	All voices (voice)
1999	Croc 2	All voices (voice)
2001	Rally Trophy	Co-Driver (voice)
