= Victoria Ekanoye =

English actress

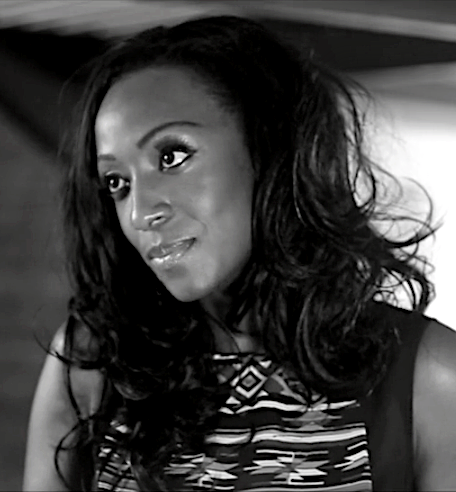
- Ekanoye in Elle Fatale 2013
- Born: 11 December 1981 (age 44); Bury, England
- Occupation: Actress
- Years active: 2010–present
- Children: 1

Victoria Ekanoye (born 11 December 1981) is an English actress, singer and producer. She began her career in The Lion King. On television, she is best known in the UK for her role in the ITV soap opera Coronation Street (2017–2019) and in the US on the E! drama The Royals (2015–2018).

== Early life and education ==
Ekanoye was born in Bury, Greater Manchester and grew up in Stockport, Manchester and Rochdale. She is of Nigerian, English and Irish descent, the latter through her maternal grandmother. Ekanoye studied musical theatre at Oldham College.

== Career ==
In 2017, Ekanoye played Angie Appleton in the ITV soap opera, Coronation Street, for 94 episodes 18 months.

She has also played Rachel in The Royals, and has appeared in The Chase: Celebrity Special, The Big Quiz and The X Factor: Celebrity.

She also appeared in series two of Almost Never and two episodes of Doctors as Kate Bennett.

In 2022, she appeared in the fourth episode of Series 11 of the BBC crime drama series Death in Paradise, as Miranda Priestley. The same year, she starred as Megan in Lionsgate Films' Christmas in Paradise, with a cast that included Kelsey Grammer, Elizabeth Hurley and Billy Ray Cyrus.

== Personal life ==
Ekanoye has sickle cell anaemia. On 8 November 2021, Ekanoye announced that she had been diagnosed with breast cancer. After undergoing a double mastectomy, and a year out, she was able to resume acting, returning to television in 2022, as Miranda Priestley in Death in Paradise.

== Filmography ==
Year	Title	Role	Notes
2013	Dormant	Girl	Short film
2013	Elle Fatale	Elle	Short film
2013	Adots Apprentice	Brenda	TV Mini Series
2015	Mop, Bucket and Cape	Ms. Magnificient	Short film
2017	Last Laugh	Tilly Lewis	Film
2015–2018	The Royals	Rachel	23 episodes
2017–2019	Coronation Street	Angie Appleton	94 episodes
2019	Almost Never	Ashley	1 episode
2020	Doctors	Kate Bennett	2 episodes
2020	The Worst Witch	Narcissus Nightshade	2 episodes
2022	Death in Paradise	Miranda Priestley	1 episode
2022	Christmas in Paradise	Megan	Film
2023	Vera	Liv Masters	1 episode
2023	The Real Full Monty	Herself	2 episodes
