= Mary Taylor (Coronation Street) =

Fictional character from Coronation Street

- Coronation Street character
- Portrayed by: Patti Clare
- Duration: 2008–present
- First appearance: 26 November 2008
- Introduced by: Kim Crowther
- Spin-off appearances: Coronation Street: A Knights Tale (2010); Coronation Street: Text Santa Special (2012–2013)
In-universe information
- Other names: Mary Cole; Mary Elspeth Taylor
- Occupation: Nanny; Florist shop assistant
- Mother: Maureen Taylor
- Husband: Norris Cole (2017–2020)
- Sons: Jude Appleton
- Grandsons: George Appleton

Mary Taylor (also Cole) is a fictional character from the British ITV soap opera Coronation Street, played by Patti Clare. The character first appeared on screen during the episode airing on 26 November 2008. Mary's storylines have included: trying to seduce Norris Cole (Malcolm Hebden) and kidnapping him when he refuses to give her attention, yet later becoming close friends; falling in love with Dev Alahan (Jimmi Harkishin); an affair with Brendan Finch (Ted Robbins); and revealing that she gave birth to a son after being raped when she was fourteen years old. Producers later introduced a new family for Mary consisting of son Jude Appleton (Paddy Wallace), his wife Angie Appleton (Victoria Ekanoye) and a grandson. Mary is often used in comedic stories and Clare has won three comedy related awards for her portrayal of Mary.

== Casting ==
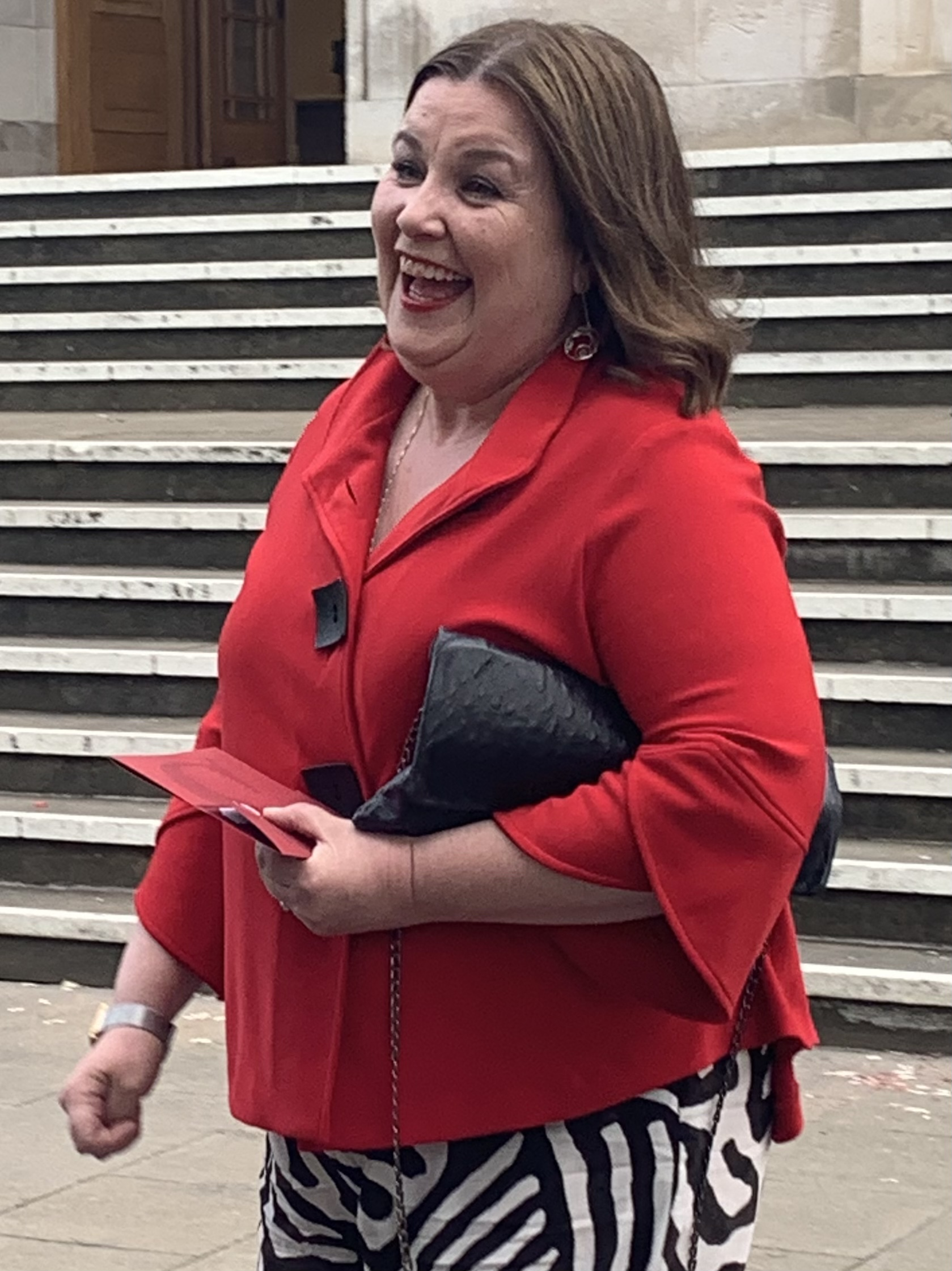
Patti Clare wrote to the soap's casting director twice before being offered the part of Mary

Clare had wanted to work on Coronation Street for some time. She wrote to the casting director requesting her involvement but was refused. She then wrote her own part for the show, a character named Cherise who would have been the sister of Raquel Watts (Sarah Lancashire). The casting department wrote back to Clare rejecting her idea. Clare was offered the role of Mary in September 2008 and Mary was billed as an "oddball competition winner". Mary was initially intended to be a guest role for five episodes. But the character's one-liners were well received by viewers and her time on the show was extended. The character remained on-screen on a recurring basis until May 2009. Clare was invited back to play the role on a regular basis signed to longer contracts. The actress has also taken part in the 2010 spin-off show titled "Coronation Street: A Knights Tale".

== Development ==
=== Norris Cole ===
Upon being introduced into the series Mary bonds with established character Norris Cole (Malcolm Hebden) over their interest of entering competitions. Mary develops feelings for Norris and tries to flirt with him. He does not respond to her behaviour and she tries to seduce him. He rejects her and becomes concerned about her romantic intentions. When Mary's mother dies she decides to go travelling. The character was later reintroduced to the series and a show publicist stated that Mary returns with the intention to reconnect with Norris. Hebden has claimed that his off-screen friendship with Clare helped to create a good comedy duo with Mary and Norris.

Norris agrees to go on a cottage holiday with Mary. Brian Roberts from the Daily Mirror revealed that Coronation Street had planned a kidnapping storyline in similar to the narrative featured in the novel Misery. While at the cottage Mary vandalises their car and telephone to prevent Norris from leaving. Mary develops fantasies of her and Norris having a romance resembling Heathcliffe and Cathy, fictional characters from the novel Wuthering Heights. Norris tries to escape but hurts his ankle and she refuses to take him to the hospital. The storyline takes a sinister turn when Norris watches Mary using an axe in the yard. He begins to fear Mary and barricades himself in the cottage. Roberts revealed that Mary becomes "seriously demented" during the scenes. Hebden branded the plot as "strangely enjoyable" to portray. He believed that rival soap operas had not portrayed such a strange "one-off" story.

=== Brendan Finch ===
In 2015, Producer Stuart Blackburn announced that he had planned romance and comedy stories for Mary. The casting department hired Ted Robbins to play Brendan Finch who was billed as a new love interest for Mary. The pair bond over Mary's interest in Brendan's magazines. Robbins stated that "he has a bit of a backbone and I think Mary likes that." He believed that Mary is instantly attracted to Brendan and he notices. The pair start an affair in secret as Brendan is married. He tells Mary that he will eventually leave his wife and plan a future with Mary. Clare told David Brown of Radio Times that Mary is true to her characterisation and has fantasies about the relationship. She believes everything that Brendan has told her. He is a "clever man" who knows the right things to say and Mary believes him. The actress added "she's totally fallen for him and he's everything to Mary: he's manly, he's straight out of a Mills and Boon novel." Norris is upset about her affair and does not like Brendan. Clare explained that Norris has become a "very loyal friend" to Mary but she thinks that he is jealous of her relationship. Dev walks in on Mary and Brendan being intimate and she is so embarrassed that she quits her child-minding job.

It was later reported that Brendan's wife Bridget would be introduced. A publicist from Coronation Street told Susan Hill of the Daily Star that Bridget slaps Mary in the face in-front of her neighbours. They added that Brendan is a "love rat" who used Mary for sex and Bridget knows exactly what her husband is like. Clare believed that her character was filled with excitement by Bridget's arrival. She believed it was to be the "eye of the storm" in her romantic novel. She presumed that the public showing would be the first step towards her future with Brendan. She thinks it is time for Bridget to know the truth, but the scenario plays out different. Brendan denies all knowledge of their affair, sides with his Bridget and she insults Mary. Clare explained that her character is left "humiliated [and] mortified" because her close friends Dev and Erica are witness to the attack. She was not worried for her character's emotional development and added "she's been badly bruised but Mary's extremely resilient. She's like the Terminator, perhaps to the point of being foolhardy."

=== Secret son and introduction of family ===
In 2016, producers decided to introduce a family for the character. Writers created a breast cancer scare for Mary. But when her results return clear, she remains upset and her friends are confused. David Brown from Radio Times reported that Mary would "deliver shock news" that would leave other characters in "astonishment". No more details were publicised prior to transmission. Norris becomes concerned for her and asks her for the truth. Mary tells Norris that she was sexually assaulted when she was fourteen and gave birth to a son. Mary's mother had forced her to conceal the pregnancy and give the child, who she had named Jude, up for adoption. Norris convinces Mary to find Jude, believing that he will not blame her for what happened. Soon Paddy Wallace joined the cast as Mary's son Jude Appleton. He gets to know Mary and asks her to move to South Africa with him. She accepts and makes preparations to leave Weatherfield. However, the character remained on the show.

Wallace later joined the cast on a permanent basis and writers introduced Mary's daughter in law Angie Appleton (Victoria Ekanoye) and grandson George Appleton (Romeo Cheetam-Karcz). Their introduction storyline involved Mary and Norris creating a sham marriage in order to win a competition. Jude and Angie arrive for the wedding and later end up moving into Coronation Street. Ekanoye told Radio Times' Brown that Jude decides to stay because getting to know Mary is a "big thing for him". She added that Mary is pivotal in convincing Jude and Angie to stay. She added "she wants her family around. So you will see her clashing with Angie quite a bit. But, in time, they might become quite a formidable force." Mary settles with her new-found family. Later stories for them include Jude pretending to be a marine biologist despite only working in an aquarium gift shop. Mary decides to keep the secret and helps him lie to Angie.

== Storylines ==
Mary becomes familiar with Norris Cole (Malcolm Hebden) after repeatedly beating him in competitions. They meet up in November 2008, and Mary was instantly taken with Norris. As they starting spending time together, Mary tells Norris that she cares for her invalid mother, and uses the competitions as a way of escape. Although shy around most people, Mary is happier in Norris's company, although her boundless enthusiasm is often met with bemusement by the more cynical Norris. Mary also spends Christmas with him and Emily Bishop (Eileen Derbyshire).

Mary and Norris win a holiday in the Bronte Country, and Norris agrees to go with Mary, when Rita Sullivan (Barbara Knox) offers to look after The Kabin. When they arrive at their house, Mary begins to enjoy herself, spending most of the days entering competitions, but Norris rebuffs her attempts to get cozy and soon makes plans to spend time away from the cottage, and phones Rita to complain about Mary. To keep Norris under control, Mary cuts the phone lines and tells Norris the motor home won't start, so they can't go anywhere. Mary finds Norris has run off and goes looking for him in the motor home. He sprains his ankle while running away, and is forced to return so that Mary can take care of him. Upon their return, Mary suggests that they get married, and is relieved when Norris doesn't immediately say no. The next day, Norris overhears Mary talking to her mother and phones the police, as he is convinced that Mary is mad and that Mary is going to kill him, like she killed her mother. The police arrive and bring them both to the station, but Mary is released without charge, as there is no evidence of foul play at the cottage. Mary confesses to Norris upon visiting him, that her mother is actually still alive.

Norris refuses to listen to Mary and rejects her attempts to speak to him thereafter, having been deeply disturbed by his ordeal at the cottage. Mary persists with her attempts to stay in Norris's life and they become friends.

After the death of Sunita Alahan (Shobna Gulati), Mary becomes the full-time nanny to her children, Aadi and Asha, and takes care of the domestic duties, after widower Dev Alahan (Jimmi Harkishin) struggles to cope with the children, and his business. She begins to have feelings towards Dev, and she and Julie Carp (Katy Cavanagh) fight for Dev's affections, however Julie and Dev later begin a relationship. Mary later has her mobile home removed, and has to move in with Julie and clashes with her, as Dev is not around. Dev returns to the street and he breaks up with Julie after developing feelings for his friend Talisa, making Mary happy.

Mary meets a fellow fan of seances and mysterious happenings, Brendan Finch (Ted Robbins) and begins a relationship with him, however after finding out he has a wife she breaks up with him, leaving Mary heartbroken. Mary and Dev spend a night together, and he panics that they had sex, and worries about his girlfriend Erica Holroyd (Claire King). Mary later reveals that they didn't have sex and just slept together after getting drunk.

Mary tells Norris that when she was 14 years old, she used to babysit for a family friend, who later raped her. She consequently fell pregnant. As her pregnancy became more conspicuous, her mother informed the neighbours that Mary was visiting an aunt. Following a homebirth, her son was left on the doorstep of St Jude's church in Newton-le-Willows. He was subsequently named Jude by a nurse named Maureen Nuttall. Mary's son finds her and asks her to move to South Africa with him, to which she agrees. After saying goodbye to her friends in The Rovers, Mary and Jude leave for the airport. However, she changes her mind and tells Norris that she wants to stay in Weatherfield.

== Reception ==
Clare has been recognised for her comic scenes and storylines on Coronation Street. In 2011 the actress was nominated for 'Funniest Performance' at the Inside Soap Awards and won 'Best Comedy Performance' at the British Soap Awards. More "funniest female" nominations followed for Clare at the 2012, 2013, 2014 and 2015 Inside Soap Awards.

The character's behaviour and stories have led her to be dubbed as "Scary Mary" and "Mad Mary" in British media. Jennifer Rodger from the Daily Mirror branded Mary's love life a "complete disaster area". She opined that the writers were cruel to Mary with endless heartbreak put onto the character. Their colleague stated that "Mary's risqué, off-the-wall remarks are turning her into one of the Street's funniest characters." A writer from the Belfast Telegraph branded Mary "the wonderful sidekick of Norris" and found her "a joy to watch" compared to other characters. They added "Mary is the gloriously comic yet poignant creation of the brilliant actress Patti Clare who plays her - she conceived the misfit spinster character herself." Following the arrival of Angie, Jude and George, Daniel Kilkelly from Digital Spy called it the beginning of "a brand new era for Mary".
