= Blackwood Crossing =

2017 narrative adventure video game

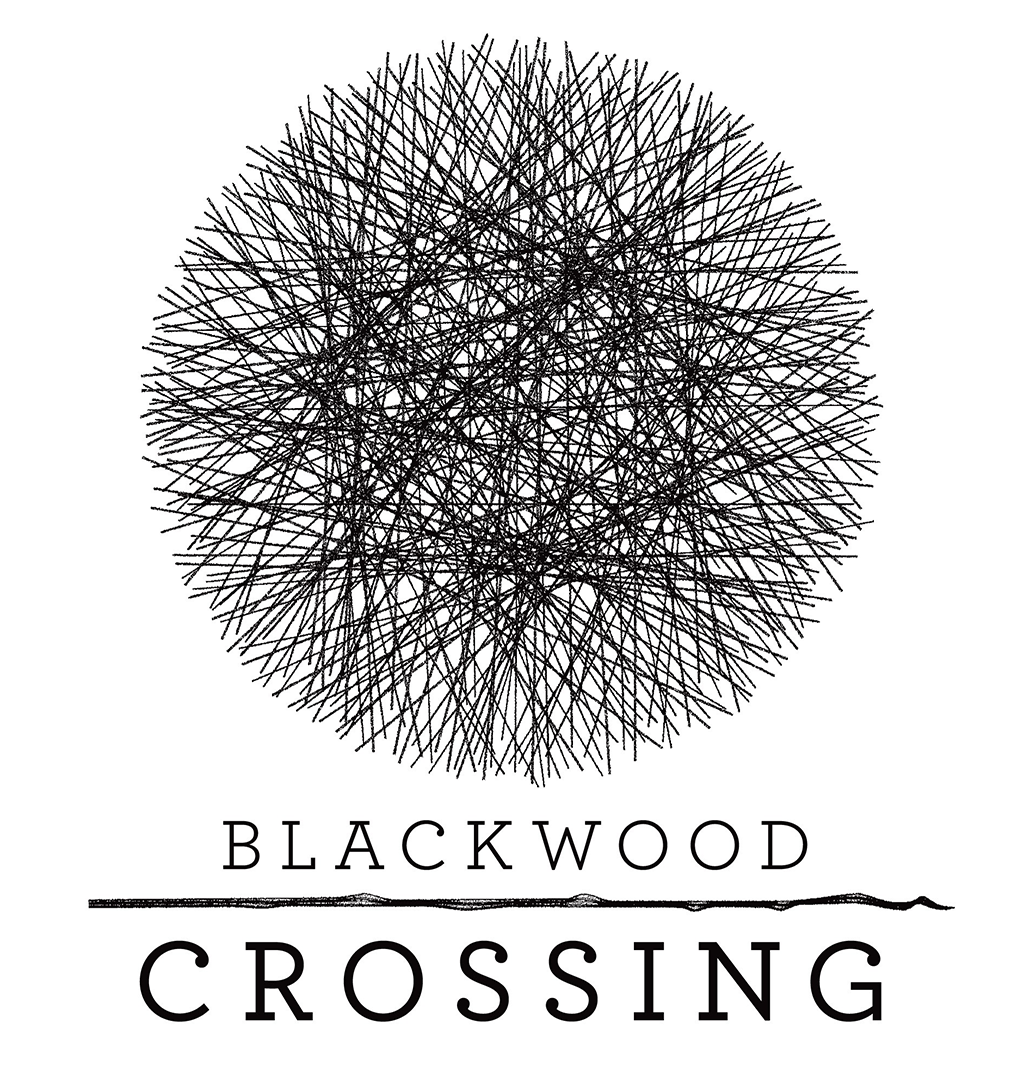
- Developer: PaperSeven
- Publisher: Vision Games
- Directors: Alice Guy; David Jefferies
- Writer: Oliver Reid-Smith
- Platforms: PlayStation 4 Windows; Xbox One
- Release: April 4, 2017
- Genre: Adventure
- Mode: Single-player

Blackwood Crossing is a first-person narrative adventure video game released on PlayStation 4 on April 4, 2017, and a day later on Xbox One and PC.

== Gameplay ==
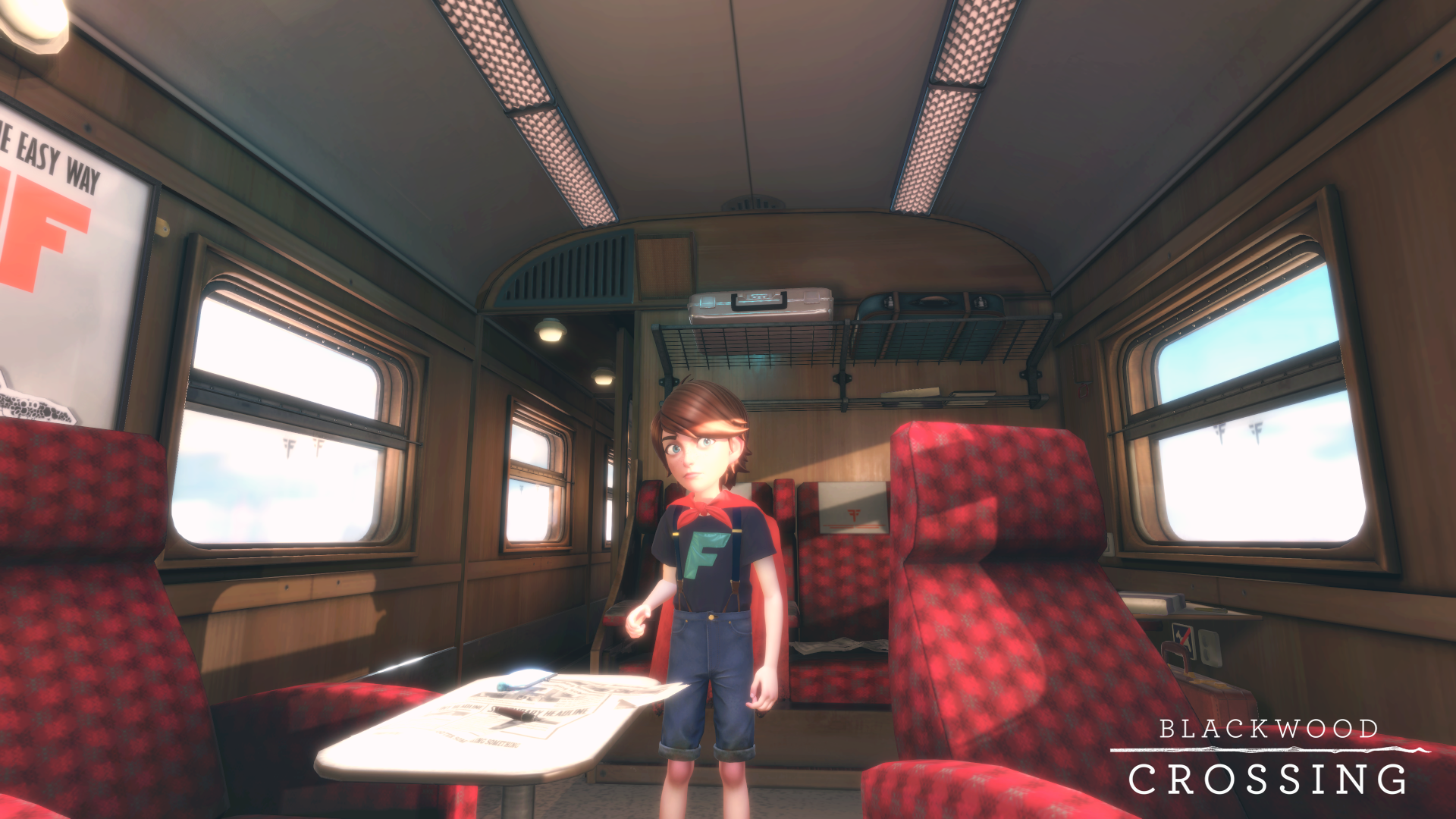
Video and screenshot of gameplay

The game is set on a moving train as two children — Scarlet and Finn — learn to navigate their relationship with each other, until their paths cross with a mysterious figure. According to the game reviews of Polygon and PlayStation Blog, the main themes of the game's story include the transition from childhood to adulthood and loss, shrouded in surrealism.

Through a series of creative and contextual puzzles, players unlock key details about Finn and Scarlett's past and uncover the mystery behind the train journey.

== Plot ==
Scarlett wakes up to find herself on a train. She searches for her brother Finn on the train in a game of Simon says. Afterward, an unnamed person wearing a rabbit mask appears and a panicked Finn tells Scarlett to wake up, making her awaken on the train once more. Unmoving figures who are all wearing animal masks begin to appear. Matching dialogue in the correct order with the masked persons creates vague contexts for the story and allows Scarlett to move onto the next area.

Scarlett begins to be unsure of her surroundings, as areas such as her grandpa's greenhouse and her treehouse shared with her brother begin to materialize and branch out of areas of the train. Throughout her journey, she develops the ability to "give life" to objects and control fire while also encountering a dark substance called Umbra, which seems to hate light.

After a few puzzles, Finn will become angry at Scarlett, saying that Scarlett left him and that Scarlett should never have left him alone. Scarlett can either choose to transfer fire out of their treehouse or transfer fire into their treehouse, creating a sense of catharsis or a sense of redemption in the dialogue between Finn and Scarlett that end with Finn and Scarlett forgiving each other for prior grievances. Scarlett then wakes up once more but on the shore by a body of water with Finn and a makeshift raft. Finn asks Scarlett to fix up 'Finnland' by finding objects to spruce up the place. After fixing Finnland, the rabbit masked figure appears and leads Scarlett through a tunnel that takes her back to the treehouse and then the train, and then returning to Finnland.

After dialogue with the masked figures while dealing with the Umbra, Scarlett realizes that Finn died in an accident when Scarlett was out on a date (implying that she was interacting with Finn's spirit this entire time). This takes Scarlett and Finn back to the treehouse and leads Finn to say he doesn't want to go alone because he does not remember what their parents, who died long ago, look like. Scarlett draws a picture of what their mom looks like and attaches it onto one of the figures, who transforms into their mom after Scarlett uses magic. Scarlett says her goodbyes and Finn and their parents walk away into the moonlight of the treehouse deck, fading away in the form of luminescent butterflies. Scarlett then wakes up back on the train, which had just arrived at a station (which implies that her entire journey was just a dream). The story ends with Scarlett noticing an animal mask nearby, which is the same mask worn by the mother figure.

== Development ==
The game was the first console/PC game developed by indie studio PaperSeven who spent 20 months developing it. The game was announced via trailer in June 2016. The small team had previously worked together on racing games, such as Split Second and Pure, and outside the genre, on The Room and at Disney.

== Reception ==
Reception

Aggregate score
Aggregator	Score
Metacritic	PS4: 72/100; XONE: 79/100

Review scores
Publication	Score
Polygon	8/10
Hardcore Gamer	3/5
Metro	6/10

Polygon recommended the game for players who appreciated narrative-driven games, such as Gone Home, Dear Esther, and Firewatch. The reviewer goes on to praise Finn's portrayal, stating "I can't recall such a good portrayal of a child in a game, since the Studio Ghibli-produced Ni No Kuni". It was among the website staff's most anticipated games of 2017, and was ranked 25th on their list of the 50 best games of 2017. Blackwood Crossing was awarded UKIE’S Game of the Show award at Gamescom 2016.
