= Patti Clare =

English actress (born 1976)

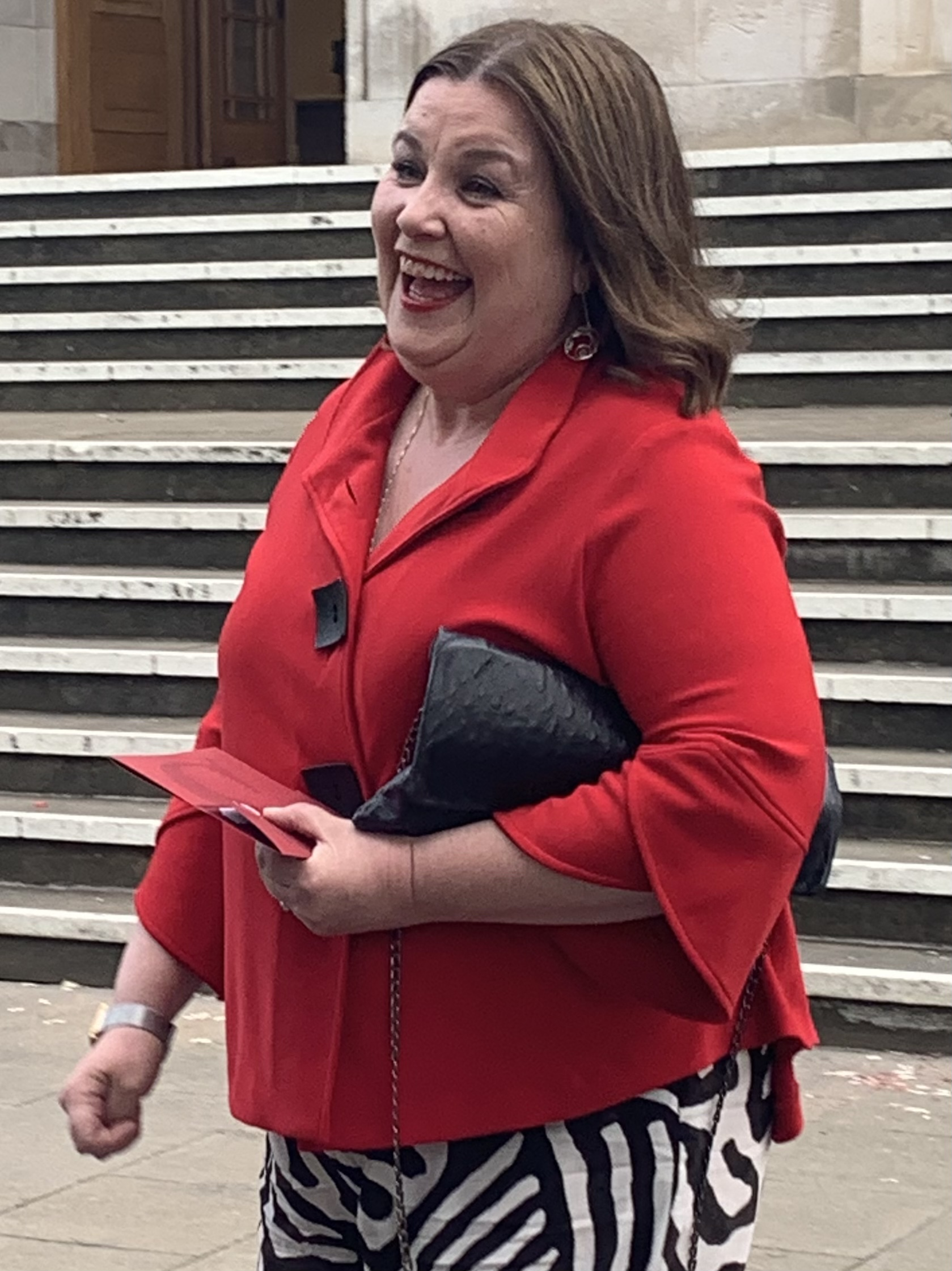
- Clare in 2022
- Born: 3 March 1976 (age 50); Manchester, England, United Kingdom
- Occupation: Actress
- Years active: 1996–present
- Employer: ITV
- Known for: Role of Mary Taylor in Coronation Street
- Awards: British Soap Award for Best Comedy Performance in 2011, 2013 and 2016

Patti Clare (born 3 March 1976) is a British actress from Manchester, England, best known for playing Mary Taylor in the ITV soap opera Coronation Street since 2008. She is a three-time winner of the British Soap Award for Best Comedy Performance (2011, 2013 and 2016).

== Life and career ==
Clare was born in Manchester. Her stage acting credits include: Edith in a production of Noël Coward's Blithe Spirit at the Citizens’ Theatre in Glasgow in 2000 and the role of Mrs. Micawber in a 2005 production of the stage play David Copperfield at the West Yorkshire Playhouse. Having built up extensive experience in theatre, Clare subsequently expressed interest in transferring to television.

"I was told I had to take a gamble for a year and turn theatre work down and sit it out. It was terrible. I didn't do any acting for nine months so I worked in an office and the job [on Coronation Street] came in September."

— Clare on her transition from stage to television actress.

Clare was told that to achieve her goal in working in television it would be in her short-term interest to turn down theatre work. In September 2008, whilst working as an office receptionist, she was offered the part of Mary Taylor in the ITV soap opera Coronation Street. She made her first appearance on 26 November 2008. The character was initially only meant to appear in five episodes.

After an initial stint which ended in 2009 Clare was offered a new contract and returned to the serial in January 2010. Television roles prior to and between her appearances as Mary included small roles in the children's fantasy series Young Dracula, a 2008 episode of the science-fiction series Torchwood, an episode of the historical medical drama Casualty 1909 and an episode of the BBC daytime soap opera Doctors. Concurrent to her regular role on Coronation Street Clare also appeared in the 2010 direct to DVD spin off Coronation Street: A Knight's Tale.

Clare has been recognised for her comic scenes on Coronation Street. She was nominated for 'Funniest Performance' at the 2011 Inside Soap Awards and won 'Best Comedy Performance' at the 2011, 2013 and 2016 British Soap Awards.

== Filmography ==
Year	Title	Role	Notes
1997	Strange But True?	Reconstruction Cast	Episode: "The Galway Poltergeist"
2007	Young Dracula	Nurse	Episode: "Insomnia"
2008	Torchwood	Ruth	Episode: "Meat"
2008–present	Coronation Street	Mary Taylor	Series regular
2009	Casualty 1909	Mrs Palmer	Series 1: Episode 4
2010	Doctors	Geraldine Buck	Episode: "Eyes Open"
2010	Coronation Street: A Knight's Tale	Mary Taylor	Coronation Street spin-off film
